= 2021–22 Dynamo Dresden season =

Dynamo Dresden
2021–22 season
- Chairman: Holger Scholze
- Manager: Alexander Schmidt
- Stadium: Rudolf-Harbig-Stadion
- 2. Bundesliga: 16th (relegated)
- DFB-Pokal: Second round
- Top goalscorer: League: Christoph Daferner (13 goals); All: Christoph Daferner (14 goals)

The 2021–22 season is the 72nd season of competitive association football played by Dynamo Dresden, a professional football club who play their home matches at the Rudolf-Harbig-Stadion in Dresden, Saxony, Germany. Having achieved promotion from the 3. Liga during the 2020–21 season, this season marks their return to the 2. Bundesliga after having been relegated in 2020.

== Background ==
Following their relegation to the 3. Liga, Dynamo Dresden successfully rebuilt their squad and gained immediate re-promotion to the 2. Bundesliga, winning the league ahead of FC Hansa Rostock and FC Ingolstadt 04. Alexander Schmidt retains his role as manager from the previous season, having signed a new two-year contract after managing the team for the last five games of the previous season. The 2021–22 2. Bundesliga season began on 23 July 2021.

== Players ==
As of 18 January 2022

=== First-team squad ===
Note: Flags indicate national team as defined under FIFA eligibility rules; some limited exceptions apply. Players may hold more than one non-FIFA nationality.

No.	Pos.	Nation	Player
1	GK	GER	Kevin Broll
2	DF	GEO	Guram Giorbelidze
3	DF	GER	Michael Akoto
4	DF	GER	Tim Knipping
5	MF	GER	Yannick Stark
7	FW	GRE	Panagiotis Vlachodimos
8	MF	DOM	Heinz Mörschel
10	MF	GER	Patrick Weihrauch
11	FW	GER	Agyemang Diawusie
14	MF	GER	Adrian Fein
15	DF	GER	Chris Löwe
16	DF	GER	Robin Becker
17	MF	GER	Morris Schröter
19	MF	GER	Luca Herrmann
20	MF	KOR	Seo Jong-min

No.	Pos.	Nation	Player
21	DF	AUT	Michael Sollbauer
22	GK	RUS	Anton Mitryushkin
23	DF	GER	Antonis Aidonis
24	GK	GER	Patrick Wiegers
25	FW	AUS	Brandon Borrello
26	DF	GER	Sebastian Mai
27	FW	CZE	Václav Drchal
28	MF	GER	Paul Will
30	MF	GER	Julius Kade
31	GK	GER	Marius Liesegang
33	FW	GER	Christoph Daferner
34	MF	GER	Justin Löwe
35	FW	GER	Ransford-Yeboah Königsdörffer
37	FW	GER	Oliver Batista Meier
39	DF	GER	Kevin Ehlers

=== Left club during season ===
Note: Flags indicate national team as defined under FIFA eligibility rules; some limited exceptions apply. Players may hold more than one non-FIFA nationality.

No.	Pos.	Nation	Player
9	FW	GER	Pascal Sohm
14	FW	AUT	Philipp Hosiner
36	MF	GER	Max Kulke

== Transfers ==
=== Transfers in ===
Date	Pos.	Name	From	Date until	Fee	Ref.
1 July 2021	MF	(Germany) Morris Schröter	(Germany) FSV Zwickau	30 June 2023	Free transfer	
1 July 2021	MF	(South Korea) Seo Jong-min	(Germany) Eintracht Frankfurt	30 June 2024	Free transfer	
1 July 2021	MF	(Germany) Luca Herrmann	(Germany) SC Freiburg II	30 June 2024	Free transfer	
1 July 2021	MF	(Russia) Anton Mitryushkin	(Germany) Fortuna Düsseldorf II	30 June 2022	Free transfer	
1 July 2021	DF	(Germany) Michael Akoto	(Germany) 1. FSV Mainz 05 II	30 June 2023	Free transfer	
3 July 2021	MF	(Australia) Brandon Borrello	(Germany) SC Freiburg	30 June 2023	Unknown	
7 July 2021	DF	(Austria) Michael Sollbauer	(England) Barnsley F.C.	30 June 2023	Unknown	
21 July 2021	MF	(Germany) Julius Kade	(Germany) 1. FC Union Berlin	30 June 2024	Unknown	
3 January 2022	FW	(Germany) Oliver Batista Meier	(Germany) FC Bayern Munich II	30 June 2025	Unknown	
31 January 2022	GK	(Germany) Marius Liesegang	(Germany) 1. FSV Mainz 05 II	30 June 2022	Unknown	

=== Loans in ===
Date from	Pos.	Name	From	Date until	Fee	Ref.
5 July 2021	DF	(Greece) Antonis Aidonis	(Germany) VfB Stuttgart	30 June 2022	Free loan	
11 August 2021	DF	(Georgia (country)) Guram Giorbelidze	(Austria) Wolfsberger AC	30 June 2022	Free loan	
3 January 2022	FW	(Czech Republic) Václav Drchal	(Czech Republic) AC Sparta Prague	30 June 2022	Free loan	
31 January 2022	MF	(Germany) Adrian Fein	(Germany) FC Bayern Munich	30 June 2022	Free loan	

=== Transfers out ===
Date	Pos.	Name	To	Fee	Ref.
1 July 2021	DF	(Germany) Marco Hartmann		Contract expired	
1 July 2021	DF	(Germany) Niklas Kreuzer	(Germany) Hallescher FC	Contract expired	
1 July 2021	DF	(Germany) Leroy Kwadwo	(Germany) MSV Duisburg	Contract expired	
1 July 2021	GK	(Germany) Stefan Kiefer		Contract expired	
1 July 2021	MF	(Germany) Maximilian Großer	(Germany) Hamburger SV II	Contract expired	
1 July 2021	DF	(Germany) Jonathan Meier	(Germany) 1. FSV Mainz 05	Return from loan	
1 July 2021	MF	(Germany) Marvin Stefaniak	(Germany) VfL Wolfsburg	Return from loan	
1 July 2021	MF	(Germany) Julius Kade	(Germany) 1. FC Union Berlin	Buyback option	
31 August 2021	FW	(Germany) Simon Gollnack	(Germany) TSG 1899 Hoffenheim II	Free transfer	
12 January 2022	FW	(Austria) Philipp Hosiner	(Germany) Kickers Offenbach	Free transfer	
13 January 2022	FW	(Germany) Pascal Sohm	(Germany) SV Waldhof Mannheim	Free transfer	

=== Loans out ===
Date from	Pos.	Name	To	Date until	Fee	Ref.
19 July 2021	FW	(Germany) Phil Harres	(Germany) SSV Ulm 1846	30 June 2023	Free loan	
12 August 2021	DF	(Germany) Jonas Kühn	(Germany) Sonnenhof Großaspach	30 June 2022	Free loan	
26 August 2021	FW	(Slovenia) Luka Štor	(Cyprus) Apollon Limassol FC	30 June 2022	Free loan	
11 January 2022	MF	(Germany) Max Kulke	(Germany) ZFC Meuselwitz	30 June 2022	Free loan	

== Friendly matches ==
26 June 2021	Dynamo Dresden	3–1	Hertha BSC II	Dresden
14:00	Hosiner 62', 79'; Sohm 78'	Report	Adabayo 82'	Stadium: Walter-Fritzsch-Akademie; Attendance: 0

30 June 2021	Dynamo Dresden	3–1	FK Jablonec	Dresden
14:00	Daferner 21', 59'; Hosiner 41'	Report	Kratochvíl 36'	Stadium: Rudolf-Harbig-Stadion; Attendance: 250

3 July 2021	Dynamo Dresden	1–0	Eintracht Braunschweig	Heiligenstadt
16:00	Pascal Sohm 86'	Report		Stadium: Stadion Gesundbrunnen; Attendance: 500

10 July 2021	Dynamo Dresden	0–1	Pogoń Szczecin	Dresden
14:00		Report	Kamil Drygas 85' (pen.)	Stadium: Walter-Fritzsch-Akademie; Attendance: 0

17 July 2021	1. FC Union Berlin	3–0	Dynamo Dresden	Berlin
14:00	Ingvartsen 37'; Voglsammer 45'; Knoche 54'	Report		Stadium: Stadion An der Alten Försterei; Attendance: 3,278

26 July 2021	Dynamo Dresden	5–1	SC Freital	Dresden
18:00	Seo 3'; Hosiner 5'; Štor 21'; Sohm 53'; Gollnack 84'	Report	Schulze 15'	Stadium: Walter-Fritzsch-Akademie; Attendance: 100

28 September 2021	Dynamo Dresden	8–0	Bischofswerdaer FV 08	Dresden
18:30	Seo 1'; Sohm 19', 29'; Hosiner 21'; Herrmann 35'; Oehmichen 56'; Ehrlich 64', 85'	Report		Stadium: Walter-Fritzsch-Akademie; Attendance: 0

7 October 2021	Dynamo Dresden	4–0	FC Viktoria 1889 Berlin	Dresden
14:00	Hosiner 14'; Königsdörffer 16'; Mörschel 24'; Kade 32'	Report		Stadium: Walter-Fritzsch-Akademie; Attendance: 170; Referee: Alexander Sather

12 November 2021	Dynamo Dresden	3–1	FK Ústí nad Labem	Dresden
14:00	Daferner 25' (pen.); Ehlers 30'; Borrello 52'	Report	Alexandr 80'	Stadium: Walter-Fritzsch-Akademie; Attendance: 100

8 January 2022	Dynamo Dresden	5–0	FC Erzgebirge Aue	Dresden
14:00	Borrello 24', 66'; Drchal 73', 110'; Mörschel 118' (pen.)	Report		Stadium: Walter-Fritzsch-Akademie; Attendance: 0

28 January 2022	Dynamo Dresden	3–3	FSV Zwickau	Dresden
14:00	Mörschel 39'; Schröter 79' (pen.); Diawusie 89'	Report	Voigt 54'; Starke 62'; Lokotsch 87'	Stadium: Walter-Fritzsch-Akademie; Attendance: 0

== Competitions ==
Win Draw Loss

=== Overall record ===
Competition	First match	Last match	Starting round	Record							
Competition	First match	Last match	Starting round	Pld	W	D	L	GF	GA	GD	Win %
2. Bundesliga	24 July 2021	15 May 2022	Matchday 1	34	7	11	16	33	46	−13	20.59
DFB-Pokal	6 August 2021		First round	3	1	0	2	4	4	+0	33.33
Total				37	8	11	18	37	50	−13	21.62

Last updated: 15 May 2022
Source: Soccerway

=== 2. Bundesliga ===
==== League table ====
Pos	Team	Pld	W	D	L	GF	GA	GD	Pts	Promotion, qualification or relegation
14	SV Sandhausen	34	10	11	13	42	54	−12	41	
15	Jahn Regensburg	34	10	10	14	50	51	−1	40	
16	Dynamo Dresden (R)	34	7	11	16	33	46	−13	32	Qualification for relegation play-offs
17	Erzgebirge Aue (R)	34	6	8	20	32	72	−40	26	Relegation to 3. Liga
18	FC Ingolstadt (R)	34	4	9	21	30	65	−35	21	Relegation to 3. Liga

Source: DFB
Rules for classification: 1) Points; 2) Goal difference; 3) Goals scored; 4) Head-to-head points; 5) Head-to-head goal difference; 6) Head-to-head away goals scored; 7) Away goals scored; 8) Play-off.
(R) Relegated

==== Results summary ====
Overall								Home						Away					
Pld	W	D	L	GF	GA	GD	Pts	W	D	L	GF	GA	GD	W	D	L	GF	GA	GD
34	7	11	16	33	46	−13	32	5	5	7	18	18	0	2	6	9	15	28	−13

Last updated: 15 May 2022.
Source: DFB

==== Results by round ====
Round	1	2	3	4	5	6	7	8	9	10	11	12	13	14	15	16	17	18	19	20	21	22	23	24	25	26	27	28	29	30	31	32	33	34
Ground	H	A	H	A	H	A	A	H	A	H	A	H	A	H	A	H	A	A	H	A	H	A	H	H	A	H	A	H	A	H	A	H	A	H
Result	W	D	W	W	L	L	L	W	L	L	L	L	L	W	L	W	W	L	D	D	L	D	D	L	L	D	D	L	L	D	D	D	D	L
Position	1	3	2	2	3	4	10	6	11	11	12	13	14	13	14	12	11	11	11	12	13	12	14	14	16	16	16	16	16	16	16	16	16	16

Updated to match(es) played on 15 May 2022. Source: DFB
A = Away; H = Home; W = Win; D = Draw; L = Loss

==== Matches ====
24 July 2021 1	Dynamo Dresden	3–0	FC Ingolstadt 04	Dresden
13:30	Daferner 41', 56'; Mörschel 67'	Report		Stadium: Rudolf-Harbig-Stadion; Attendance: 7,102; Referee: Lasse Koslowski

1 August 2021 2	Hamburger SV	1–1	Dynamo Dresden	Hamburg
13:30	Reis 5'	Report	Knipping 68'	Stadium: Volksparkstadion; Attendance: 17,100; Referee: Martin Petersen

14 August 2021 3	Dynamo Dresden	2–0	Hannover 96	Dresden
20:30	Daferner 47'; Mai 82'	Report		Stadium: Rudolf-Harbig-Stadion; Attendance: 13,780; Referee: Sven Waschitzki

21 August 2021 4	FC Hansa Rostock	1–3	Dynamo Dresden	Rostock
20:30	Mamba 43'	Report	Mörschel 1'; Vlachodimos 63'; Kade 70'	Stadium: Ostseestadion; Attendance: 14,500; Referee: Benjamin Cortus

29 August 2021 5	Dynamo Dresden	0–3	SC Paderborn 07	Dresden
13:30		Report	Michel 8'; Pröger 24', 26'	Stadium: Rudolf-Harbig-Stadion; Attendance: Deniz Aytekin; Referee: 16,000

12 September 2021 6	1. FC Heidenheim	2–1	Dynamo Dresden	Heidenheim an der Brenz
13:30	Mohr 5'; Leipertz 90'	Report	Löwe 51'	Stadium: Voith-Arena; Attendance: 6,342; Referee: Martin Thomsen

19 September 2021 7	SV Darmstadt 98	1–0	Dynamo Dresden	Darmstadt
13:30	Kempe 14'	Report		Stadium: Stadion am Böllenfalltor; Attendance: 7,020; Referee: Christian Dingert

26 September 2021 8	Dynamo Dresden	3–0	SV Werder Bremen	Dresden
13:30	Daferner 40', 66'; Schröter 75'	Report		Stadium: Rudolf-Harbig-Stadion; Attendance: 16,000; Referee: Robert Hartmann

3 October 2021 9	FC St. Pauli	3–0	Dynamo Dresden	Hamburg
13:30	Buchtmann 1'; Burgstaller 73' (pen.); Beifus 90+3'	Report		Stadium: Millerntor-Stadion; Attendance: 14,773; Referee: Bastian Dankert

17 October 2021 10	Dynamo Dresden	0–1	1. FC Nürnberg	Dresden
13:30		Report	Krauß 21'	Stadium: Rudolf-Harbig-Stadion; Attendance: 16,000; Referee: Marco Fritz

23 October 2021 11	FC Schalke 04	3–0	Dynamo Dresden	Gelsenkirchen
20:30	Ouwejan 20'; Bülter 78'; Kamiński 90+4'	Report		Stadium: Arena AufSchalke; Attendance: 54,526; Referee: Sven Jablonski

30 October 2021 12	Dynamo Dresden	0–1	SV Sandhausen	Dresden
13:30		Report	Testroet 50'	Stadium: Rudolf-Harbig-Stadion; Attendance: 11,144; Referee: Martin Thomsen

5 November 2020 13	Holstein Kiel	2–1	Dynamo Dresden	Kiel
18:30	Pichler 65' (pen.); Reese 66'	Report	Mörschel 32'	Stadium: Holstein-Stadion; Attendance: 8,919; Referee: Florian Heft

21 November 2021 14	Dynamo Dresden	1–0	Fortuna Düsseldorf	Dresden
13:30	Daferner 43' (pen.)	Report		Stadium: Rudolf-Harbig-Stadion; Attendance: 8,912; Referee: Matthias Jöllenbeck

26 November 2021 15	SSV Jahn Regensburg	3–1	Dynamo Dresden	Regensburg
18:30	Saller 34'; Caliskaner 80'; Makridis 82'	Report	Daferner 47'	Stadium: Jahnstadion; Attendance: 3,413; Referee: Lasse Koslowski

5 December 2021 16	Dynamo Dresden	3–1	Karlsruher SC	Dresden
13:30	Königsdörffer 47', 55'; Daferner 69'	Report	Schleusener 52'	Stadium: Rudolf-Harbig-Stadion; Attendance: 0 Referee: Benjamin Cortus

12 December 2021 17	FC Erzgebirge Aue	0–1	Dynamo Dresden	Aue
13:30		Report	Königsdörffer 61'	Stadium: Erzgebirgsstadion; Attendance: 0 Referee: Felix Brych

18 December 2021 18	FC Ingolstadt 04	3–0	Dynamo Dresden	Ingolstadt
13:30	Antonitsch 1'; Ehlers 17' (o.g.); Bilbija 85'	Report		Stadium: Audi Sportpark; Attendance: 0 Referee: Florian Heft

14 January 2022 19	Dynamo Dresden	1–1	Hamburger SV	Dresden
18:30	Daferner 61'	Report	Glatzel 37'	Stadium: Rudolf-Harbig-Stadion; Attendance: 1.000; Referee: Nicolas Winter

23 January 2022 20	Hannover 96	0–0	Dynamo Dresden	Hanover
13:30		Report		Stadium: Niedersachsenstadion; Attendance: 500; Referee: Robert Kampka

6 February 2022 21	Dynamo Dresden	1–4	FC Hansa Rostock	Dresden
13:30	Daferner (yellow card) 47'; Batista Meier (yellow card) 60'; Kade 63'; Stark (yellow card) 85'	Report	Verhoek 6' 18'; Fröling 10' 13'; Roßbach (yellow card) 60'; Fröde (yellow card) 64'	Stadium: Rudolf-Harbig-Stadion; Attendance: 10,000; Referee: (Germany) Martin Thomsen

12 February 2022 22	SC Paderborn 07	0–0	Dynamo Dresden	Paderborn
13:30	Yalçın (yellow card) 6'; Hünemeier (yellow card) 74'	Report	Akoto (yellow card) 48'	Stadium: Benteler-Arena; Attendance: 3.614; Referee: (Germany) Sven Jablonski

18 February 2022 23	Dynamo Dresden	1–1	1. FC Heidenheim	Dresden
18:30	Daferner 59' (pen.); Borrello (yellow card) 63'	Report	Kühlwetter (yellow card) 37'; Schimmer 55'; Schöppner (yellow card) 58'; Theuerkauf (yellow card) 70'; Busch (yellow card) 78'; Leipertz (yellow card) 90+1'	Stadium: Rudolf-Harbig-Stadion; Attendance: 6,792; Referee: (Germany) Franz Bokop

26 February 2022 24	Dynamo Dresden	0–1	SV Darmstadt 98	Dresden
20:30	Giorbelidze (yellow card) 13'; Becker (yellow card) 78'; Stark (yellow card) 84'	Report	Gjasula (yellow card) 26'; Honsak 90+3'	Stadium: Rudolf-Harbig-Stadion; Attendance: 10,024; Referee: (Germany) Florian Lechner

6 March 2022 25	SV Werder Bremen	2–1	Dynamo Dresden	Bremen
13:30	Füllkrug 16' 44'; Groß (yellow card) 26'	Report	Königsdörffer 2'; Kade (yellow card) 28'; Sollbauer (yellow card) 90'	Stadium: Weserstadion; Attendance: 25,000; Referee: (Germany) Martin Thomsen

12 March 2022 26	Dynamo Dresden	1–1	FC St. Pauli	Dresden
13:30	Daferner 20'	Report	Makienok 42'	Stadium: Rudolf-Harbig-Stadion; Attendance: 16,000; Referee: (Germany) Daniel Siebert

20 March 2022 27	1. FC Nürnberg	1–1	Dynamo Dresden	Nuremberg
13:30	Nürnberger 12'; Duman (yellow card) 81'; Schäffler (yellow card) 88'	Report	Daferner 12'; Knipping (yellow card) 81'	Stadium: Max-Morlock-Stadion; Attendance: 27,826; Referee: (Germany) Robert Hartmann

1 April 2022 28	Dynamo Dresden	1–2	FC Schalke 04	Dresden
18:30	Will (yellow card) 17' (goal) 70'; Becker (yellow card) 84'	Report	Itakura (yellow card) 34'; Drexler (yellow card) 36'; Terodde 45' (pen.), 51'; Çalhanoğlu (yellow card) 75'; Churlinov (yellow card) 77'	Stadium: Rudolf-Harbig-Stadion; Attendance: 30,273; Referee: (Germany) Harm Osmers

10 April 2022 29	SV Sandhausen	2–1	Dynamo Dresden	Sandhausen
13:30	Đumić 7'; Okoroji (yellow card) 40'; Bachmann (yellow card) 41'; Zenga 48'; Kinsombi (yellow card) 64'; Diekmeier (yellow card) 86'; Deville (yellow card) 89'; Soukou (yellow card) 90'	Report	Will (yellow card) 41'; Sollbauer (yellow card) 44'; Knipping 65'; Schröter (yellow card) 76'	Stadium: BWT-Stadion am Hardtwald; Attendance: 5,000; Referee: (Germany) Patrick Hanslbauer

16 April 2022 30	Dynamo Dresden	0–0	Holstein Kiel	Dresden
13:30	Sollbauer (yellow card) 41'; Akoto (yellow card) 61'	Report	Skrzybski (yellow card) 37'; Korb (yellow card) 79'	Stadium: Rudolf-Harbig-Stadion; Attendance: 21,544; Referee: (Germany) Robert Kampka

22 April 2022 31	Fortuna Düsseldorf	2–2	Dynamo Dresden	Düsseldorf
18:30	Appelkamp 26'; de Wijs 31'; Gavory (yellow card) 90'	Report	Knipping (yellow card) 28'; Giorbelidse (yellow card) 44'; Will 71'; Batista Meier (yellow card) 73'; Königsdörffer 80' (yellow card) 88'	Stadium: Merkur Spielarena; Attendance: 25,264; Referee: (Germany) Martin Petersen

30 April 2022 32	Dynamo Dresden	1–1	SSV Jahn Regensburg	Dresden
13:30	Daferner 73'	Report	Albers 88'	Stadium: Rudolf-Harbig-Stadion; Attendance: 20,376; Referee: (Germany) Tobias Stieler

8 May 2022 33	Karlsruher SC	2–2	Dynamo Dresden	Karlsruhe
13:30	Gondorf 65'; Hofmann 74'; Wanitzek (yellow card) 87'	Report	Weihrauch 26' (yellow card) 69'; Diawusie (yellow card) 60'; Broll (yellow card) 70'; Königsdörffer (yellow card) 87'; Knipping (yellow card) 87'; Akoto 90+4'	Stadium: Wildparkstadion; Attendance: 18,649; Referee: (Germany) Robin Braun

15 May 2022 34	Dynamo Dresden	0–1	FC Erzgebirge Aue	Dresden
15:30	Sollbauer (yellow card) 72'; Borrello (yellow card) 90+5'	Report	Kühn 53'; Owusu (yellow card) 55'; Baumgart (yellow card) 64'; Bussmann (yellow card) 83'	Stadium: Rudolf-Harbig-Stadion; Attendance: 29,382; Referee: (Germany) Christof Günsch

=== DFB-Pokal ===
6 August 2021 First round	Dynamo Dresden	2–1	SC Paderborn 07	Dresden
20:45	Knipping 54'; Kade 88'	Report	Michel 60'	Stadium: Rudolf-Harbig-Stadion; Attendance: 12,702; Referee: Christof Günsch

27 October 2021 Second round	Dynamo Dresden	2–3 (a.e.t.)	FC St. Pauli	Dresden
18:30	Daferner 66'; Ziereis 73' (o.g.)	Report	Paqarada 63'; Dittgen 72'; Buchtmann 101'	Stadium: Rudolf-Harbig-Stadion; Attendance: 16,000; Referee: Sven Waschitzki
