= 2020–21 Dynamo Dresden season =

Dynamo Dresden
2020–21 season
- Chairman: Holger Scholze
- Manager: Markus Kauczinski (until 25 April 2021); Alexander Schmidt
- Stadium: Rudolf-Harbig-Stadion
- 3. Liga: 1st (promoted)
- DFB-Pokal: Second round
- Top goalscorer: League: Christoph Daferner (12 goals); All: Christoph Daferner (13 goals)
| Home colours | Away colours |
- All statistics correct as of 16:00, 13 March 2021 (UTC).

The 2020–21 season is the 71st season of competitive association football played by Dynamo Dresden, a professional football club who play their home matches at the Rudolf-Harbig-Stadion in Dresden, Saxony, Germany. Their 18th-place finish in the 2019–20 season meant that it would be the clubs first season in the third-tier of German football, the 3. Liga, since the 2015–16 season.

== Background ==
The 2019–20 season saw Dynamo Dresden finish bottom of the 2. Bundesliga on 32 points and were thus relegated to the 3. Liga. Markus Kauczinski retains his role from the previous season despite relegation, having been appointed in December 2019. It was originally planned for the 3. Liga season to begin on 24 July 2020, though as a result of the COVID-19 pandemic, the beginning of the 2020–21 season was delayed until 18 September 2020.

== Season summary ==
After mixed results in pre-season friendlies, Dynamo saw a strong start to their season with wins against first round DFB-Pokal opponent Hamburger SV, a 2. Bundesliga side, and 1. FC Kaiserslautern, but subsequently struggled, losing four of the following eight games. Results improved after a 2–1 home victory over TSV 1860 Munich in round 10, however, with Dynamo going on an eight-game-long lossless streak. A goalless draw against KFC Uerdingen 05 in round 14 made them league leaders, and Dynamo would go on to lose only two more league games until March 2021, although they dropped out of the DFB-Pokal after a 0–3 second round loss against SV Darmstadt 98 on 22 December 2020.

Having now spent much of the season as the league's comfortable leader, things took a sudden turn for the worse when, in late March and April 2021, Dynamo lost three out of four league games in a row, culminating in a 0–3 home loss against Hallescher FC, at the time a team located firmly in the second half of the table. The situation was further complicated by the occurrence of several COVID-19 cases in the team, leading to quarantine periods and the rescheduling of several league games; round 34 was played before rounds 32 and 33. Following the loss against Halle and a sudden drop from the league's top position, head coach Markus Kauczinski was sacked and replaced by Alexander Schmidt on 25 April. Schmidt was able to reverse the team's fortunes immediately, winning five of the remaining six games without conceding a single goal, thus regaining the top position soon after his installation. Dynamo ultimately won the league four points ahead of FC Hansa Rostock and was promoted to the 2. Bundesliga.

== Players ==
As of 25 May 2021

=== First-team squad ===
Note: Flags indicate national team as defined under FIFA eligibility rules; some limited exceptions apply. Players may hold more than one non-FIFA nationality.

| No. | Pos. | Nation | Player |
|---|---|---|---|
| 1 | GK | (Germany) GER | Kevin Broll |
| 3 | DF | (Germany) GER | Leroy Kwadwo |
| 4 | DF | (Germany) GER | Tim Knipping |
| 5 | MF | (Germany) GER | Yannick Stark |
| 6 | DF | (Germany) GER | Marco Hartmann |
| 7 | MF | (Greece) GRE | Panagiotis Vlachodimos |
| 8 | MF | (Dominican Republic) DOM | Heinz Mörschel |
| 9 | FW | (Germany) GER | Pascal Sohm |
| 10 | MF | (Germany) GER | Patrick Weihrauch |
| 11 | MF | (Germany) GER | Agyemang Diawusie |
| 13 | MF | (Germany) GER | Marvin Stefaniak |
| 14 | FW | (Austria) AUT | Philipp Hosiner |
| 15 | DF | (Germany) GER | Chris Löwe |
| 16 | DF | (Germany) GER | Robin Becker |

| No. | Pos. | Nation | Player |
|---|---|---|---|
| 17 | MF | (Germany) GER | Maximilian Großer |
| 19 | DF | (Germany) GER | Jonathan Meier |
| 20 | MF | (Germany) GER | Julius Kade |
| 22 | DF | (Germany) GER | Niklas Kreuzer |
| 24 | GK | (Germany) GER | Patrick Wiegers |
| 26 | DF | (Germany) GER | Sebastian Mai |
| 28 | MF | (Germany) GER | Paul Will |
| 33 | FW | (Germany) GER | Christoph Daferner |
| 34 | MF | (Germany) GER | Justin Löwe |
| 35 | MF | (Germany) GER | Ransford-Yeboah Königsdörffer |
| 36 | DF | (Germany) GER | Max Kulke |
| 37 | FW | (Germany) GER | Luka Štor |
| 39 | DF | (Germany) GER | Kevin Ehlers |

== Transfers ==
=== Transfers in ===
| Date | Position | Name | From | Fee | Ref. |
|---|---|---|---|---|---|
| 13 July 2020 | DF | Tim Knipping | SSV Jahn Regensburg | Undisclosed | |
| 14 July 2020 | MF | Yannick Stark | SV Darmstadt 98 | Free transfer | |
| 15 July 2020 | MF | Panagiotis Vlachodimos | Sonnenhof Großaspach | Free transfer | |
| 18 July 2020 | DF | Sebastian Mai | Hallescher FC | Free transfer | |
| 20 July 2020 | FW | Philipp Hosiner | Chemnitzer FC | Free transfer | |
| 23 July 2020 | FW | Pascal Sohm | Hallescher FC | Free transfer | |
| 24 July 2020 | FW | Agyemang Diawusie | FC Ingolstadt 04 | Undisclosed | |
| 29 July 2020 | DF | Robin Becker | Eintracht Braunschweig | Free transfer | |
| 5 August 2020 | MF | Julius Kade | 1. FC Union Berlin | Free transfer | |
| 7 August 2020 | FW | Christoph Daferner | SC Freiburg | Undisclosed | |
| 7 August 2020 | MF | Patrick Weihrauch | Arminia Bielefeld | Free transfer | |
| 22 August 2020 | MF | Paul Will | Bayern Munich II | Undisclosed | |
| 18 January 2021 | DF | Leroy Kwadwo | Würzburger Kickers | Free transfer | |
| 20 January 2021 | MF | Heinz Mörschel | KFC Uerdingen 05 | Free transfer | |
| 20 January 2021 | MF | Niklas Kreuzer | Unsigned | Free transfer | |

=== Loans in ===
| Date from | Position | Name | From | Date until | Ref. |
|---|---|---|---|---|---|
| 6 August 2020 | DF | Jonathan Meier | 1. FSV Mainz 05 | 30 June 2021 | |
| 5 October 2020 | MF | Marvin Stefaniak | VfL Wolfsburg | 30 June 2021 | |

=== Transfers out ===
| Date | Position | Name | To | Fee | Ref. |
|---|---|---|---|---|---|
| 1 July 2020 | DF | Linus Wahlqvist | (Sweden) IFK Norrköping | Released | |
| 1 July 2020 | DF | Jannik Müller | (Slovakia) Dunajská Streda | Released | |
| 1 July 2020 | GK | Tim Boss | SV Wehen Wiesbaden | Released | |
| 1 July 2020 | DF | Florian Ballas | FC Erzgebirge Aue | Released | |
| 1 July 2020 | MF | René Klingenburg | FC Viktoria Köln | Released | |
| 1 July 2020 | FW | Simon Makienok | FC St. Pauli | Contract expired | |
| 13 July 2020 | DF | Jannis Nikolaou | Eintracht Braunschweig | Undisclosed | |
| 6 August 2020 | MF | Matthäus Taferner | (Austria) Wolfsberger AC | Undisclosed | |
| 11 September 2020 | DF | Brian Hämäläinen | (Denmark) Lyngby BK | Released | |
| 11 September 2020 | FW | Osman Atılgan | SC Preußen Münster | Released | |
| 5 January 2021 | FW | Alexander Jeremejeff | (Sweden) BK Häcken | Undisclosed | |

=== Loans out ===
| Date from | Position | Name | To | Date until | Ref. |
|---|---|---|---|---|---|
| 3 August 2020 | FW | Alexander Jeremejeff | (Netherlands) FC Twente | 31 December 2020 | |
| 3 August 2020 | FW | Vasil Kušej | (Czech Republic) FK Ústí nad Labem | 30 June 2021 | |
| 3 February 2021 | FW | Simon Gollnack | (Czech Republic) FK Ústí nad Labem | 30 June 2021 | |

== Friendly matches ==
| 9 August 2020 | Dynamo Dresden | 2–3 | Hertha BSC II | Dresden |
| 14:00 | Königsdörffer 8'; Vlachodimos 54' | Report | Michelbrink 43'; Werthmüller 56'; Storm 88' | Stadium: Rudolf-Harbig-Stadion; Attendance: 0 Referee: Alexander Sather |

| 15 August 2020 | Union Berlin | 2–0 | Dynamo Dresden | Berlin |
| 14:30 | Mees 50'; Becker 62' | Report | | Stadium: Stadion An der Alten Försterei; Attendance: 0 |

| 21 August 2020 | Eintracht Braunschweig | 1–0 | Dynamo Dresden | Heiligenstadt |
| 15:30 | Klaß 59' | Report | | Attendance: 0 |

| 26 August 2020 | Dynamo Dresden | 0–2 | (England) Norwich City | Dresden |
| 16:00 | | Report | Pukki 12'; Hugill 83' | Stadium: Rudolf-Harbig-Stadion; Attendance: 0 |

| 2 September 2020 | Dynamo Dresden | 5–1 | (Denmark) HB Køge | Dresden |
| 16:00 | Diawusie 26'; Daferner 33', 71'; Hartmann 67'; Gollnack 87' | Report | Adedeji 36' | Stadium: Rudolf-Harbig-Stadion; Attendance: 0 |

| 5 September 2020 | Erzgebirge Aue | 0–1 | Dynamo Dresden | Aue |
| 14:00 | | Report | Diawusie 7' | Stadium: Erzgebirgsstadion; Attendance: 0 |

| 6 January 2021 | Dynamo Dresden | 2–1 | (Czech Republic) Jablonec | Dresden |
| 14:00 | Becker 37'; Diawusie 48' | Report | Doležal 79' | Attendance: 0 |

== Competitions ==
Win Draw Loss

=== Overview ===
| Competition | First match | Last match | Starting round | Final position | Record | | | | | | | |
| Competition | First match | Last match | Starting round | Final position | Pld | W | D | L | GF | GA | GD | Win % |
|---|---|---|---|---|---|---|---|---|---|---|---|---|
| 3. Liga | 18 September 2020 | 22 May 2021 | Matchday 1 | 1st | 38 | 23 | 6 | 9 | 61 | 29 | +32 | 60.53 |
| DFB-Pokal | 6–9 August 2021 | | First round | Second round | 2 | 1 | 0 | 1 | 4 | 4 | +0 | 50.00 |
| Total | | | | | 40 | 24 | 6 | 10 | 65 | 33 | +32 | 60.00 |

Source: Competitions

=== 3. Liga ===
==== League table ====
| Pos | Team | Pld | W | D | L | GF | GA | GD | Pts | Qualification or relegation |
|---|---|---|---|---|---|---|---|---|---|---|
| 1 | Dynamo Dresden (C, P) | 38 | 23 | 6 | 9 | 61 | 29 | +32 | 75 | Promotion to 2. Bundesliga and qualification for DFB-Pokal |
| 2 | Hansa Rostock (P) | 38 | 20 | 11 | 7 | 52 | 33 | +19 | 71 | Promotion to 2. Bundesliga and qualification for DFB-Pokal |
| 3 | FC Ingolstadt (O, P) | 38 | 20 | 11 | 7 | 56 | 40 | +16 | 71 | Qualification for promotion play-offs and DFB-Pokal |
| 4 | 1860 Munich | 38 | 18 | 12 | 8 | 69 | 35 | +34 | 66 | Qualification for DFB-Pokal |
| 5 | 1. FC Saarbrücken | 38 | 16 | 11 | 11 | 66 | 51 | +15 | 59 | |

Source: DFB
Rules for classification: 1) Points; 2) Goal difference; 3) Goals scored; 4) Head-to-head results; 5) Head-to-head away goals scored; 6) Away goals scored; 7) Play-off.
(C) Champions; (O) Play-off winners; (P) Promoted

==== Results summary ====
| Overall | | | | | | | | Home | | | | | | Away | | | | | |
| Pld | W | D | L | GF | GA | GD | Pts | W | D | L | GF | GA | GD | W | D | L | GF | GA | GD |
|---|---|---|---|---|---|---|---|---|---|---|---|---|---|---|---|---|---|---|---|
| 38 | 23 | 6 | 9 | 61 | 29 | +32 | 75 | 12 | 5 | 2 | 35 | 14 | +21 | 11 | 1 | 7 | 26 | 15 | +11 |

Last updated: 17 May 2021.
Source: Kicker

==== Results by round ====
| Round | 1 | 2 | 3 | 4 | 5 | 6 | 7 | 8 | 9 | 10 | 11 | 12 | 13 | 14 | 15 | 16 | 17 | 18 | 19 | 20 | 21 | 22 | 23 | 24 | 25 | 26 | 27 | 28 | 29 | 30 | 31 | 32 | 33 | 34 | 35 | 36 | 37 | 38 |
|---|---|---|---|---|---|---|---|---|---|---|---|---|---|---|---|---|---|---|---|---|---|---|---|---|---|---|---|---|---|---|---|---|---|---|---|---|---|---|
| Ground | A | H | A | H | A | H | A | H | A | H | A | H | A | H | A | H | A | A | H | H | A | H | A | H | A | H | A | H | A | H | A | H | A | H | A | H | H | A |
| Result | W | D | L | W | W | L | L | W | L | W | W | W | W | D | W | W | W | L | W | W | L | D | W | W | W | W | W | D | L | D | L | W | W | L | D | W | W | W |
| Position | 6 | 8 | 12 | 8 | 4 | 8 | 9 | 7 | 8 | 6 | 3 | 3 | 2 | 1 | 1 | 1 | 1 | 1 | 1 | 1 | 1 | 1 | 1 | 1 | 1 | 1 | 1 | 1 | 1 | 1 | 1 | 2 | 3 | 1 | 1 | 1 | 1 | 1 |

Updated to match(es) played on 1 May 2021. Source: Kicker
A = Away; H = Home; W = Win; D = Draw; L = Loss

==== Matches ====
| 18 September 2020 1 | 1. FC Kaiserslautern | 0–1 | Dynamo Dresden | Kaiserslautern |
| 17:45 | Mai 17' | Report | | Stadium: Fritz-Walter-Stadion; Attendance: 4,150; Referee: Martin Thomsen |

| 27 September 2020 2 | Dynamo Dresden | 1–1 | SV Waldhof Mannheim | Dresden |
| | Daferner 87' | Report | Christiansen 42' | Stadium: Rudolf-Harbig-Stadion; Attendance: 10,035; Referee: Lasse Koslowski |

| 2 October 2020 3 | FC Bayern Munich II | 3–0 | Dynamo Dresden | Munich |
| 19:00 | Arp 22'; Dajaku 28'; Kühn 90' | Report | | Stadium: Stadion an der Grünwalder Straße; Attendance: 0 Referee: Martin Speckner |

| 10 October 2020 4 | Dynamo Dresden | 1–0 | 1. FC Magdeburg | Dresden |
| 14:00 | Stark 55' | Report | | Stadium: Rudolf-Harbig-Stadion; Attendance: 999; Referee: Robert Schröder |

| 17 October 2020 5 | VfB Lübeck | 0–1 | Dynamo Dresden | Lübeck |
| 14:00 | | Report | Hosiner 68' | Stadium: Stadion an der Lohmühle; Attendance: 1,860; Referee: Max Burda |

| 20 October 2020 6 | Dynamo Dresden | 1–2 | FSV Zwickau | Dresden |
| 19:00 | Hosiner 2' | Report | Schikora 4'; Jensen 30' | Stadium: Rudolf-Harbig-Stadion; Attendance: 999; Referee: Alexander Sather |

| 24 October 2020 7 | FC Ingolstadt 04 | 1–0 | Dynamo Dresden | Ingolstadt |
| 14:00 | | Report | Kutschke 5' | Stadium: Audi-Sportpark; Attendance: 0 Referee: Martin Thomsen |

| 31 October 2020 8 | Dynamo Dresden | 3–0 | SV Meppen | Dresden |
| 14:00 | Hosiner 45+4'; Königsdörffer 59'; Kade 90+3' | Report | | Stadium: Rudolf-Harbig-Stadion; Attendance: 820; Referee: Jonas Weickenmeier |

| 7 November 2020 9 | 1. FC Saarbrücken | 2–1 | Dynamo Dresden | Saarbrücken |
| 14:00 | Shipnoski 45+1'; Jacob 90+1' | Report | Daferner 17' | Stadium: Ludwigsparkstadion; Attendance: 0 Referee: Nicolas Winter |

| 15 November 2020 10 | Dynamo Dresden | 2–1 | TSV 1860 Munich | Dresden |
| 14:00 | Stark 33'; Königsdörffer 70' | Report | Steinhart 27' | Stadium: Rudolf-Harbig-Stadion; Attendance: 0 Referee: Florian Lechner |

| 21 November 2020 11 | FC Hansa Rostock | 1–3 | Dynamo Dresden | Rostock |
| 14:00 | Breier 43' | Report | Daferner 14'; Hartmann 30'; Königsdörffer 41' | Stadium: Ostseestadion; Attendance: 0 Referee: Manuel Gräfe |

| 25 November 2020 12 | Dynamo Dresden | 2–0 | SpVgg Unterhaching | Dresden |
| 19:00 | Hartmann 26'; Hosiner 42' | Report | | Stadium: Rudolf-Harbig-Stadion; Referee: Patrick Schwengers |

| 29 November 2020 13 | MSV Duisburg | 0–3 | Dynamo Dresden | Duisburg |
| | | Report | Hosiner 25'; Weihrauch 53'; Daferner 54' | Stadium: Schauinsland-Reisen-Arena; Attendance: 0 Referee: Franz Bokop |

| 5 December 2020 14 | Dynamo Dresden | 0–0 | KFC Uerdingen 05 | Dresden |
| 14:00 | | Report | | Stadium: Rudolf-Harbig-Stadion; Attendance: 0 Referee: Max Burda |

| 12 December 2020 15 | Hallescher FC | 1–3 | Dynamo Dresden | Halle (Saale) |
| 14:00 | Derstroff 7' | Report | Stark 26'; Becker 45'; Weihrauch 90+3' | Stadium: Erdgas Sportpark; Attendance: 0 Referee: Florian Heft |

| 15 December 2020 16 | Dynamo Dresden | 4–1 | SC Verl | Dresden |
| 19:00 | Kade 43', 79'; Weihrauch 70'; Königsdörffer 75' | Report | Janjic 56' | Stadium: Rudolf-Harbig-Stadion; Attendance: 0 Referee: Patrick Hanslbauer |

| 19 December 2020 17 | FC Viktoria Köln | 2–4 | Dynamo Dresden | Cologne |
| 14:00 | Cueto 3' (pen.), 65' | Report | Daferner 59'; Hosiner 72' (pen.); Sohm 78', 89' | Stadium: Sportpark Höhenberg; Attendance: 0 Referee: Sven Waschitzki |

| 11 January 2021 18 | Türkgücü München | 1–0 | Dynamo Dresden | Munich |
| 19:00 | Sararer 32' | Report | | Stadium: Stadion an der Grünwalder Straße; Attendance: 0 Referee: Tobias Schultes |

| 23 January 2021 20 | Dynamo Dresden | 4–3 | 1. FC Kaiserslautern | Dresden |
| 14:00 | Daferner 32'; Hosiner 45', 82'; Königsdörffer 74' | Report | Redondo 14', 58'; Pourié 46' | Stadium: Rudolf-Harbig-Stadion; Attendance: 0 Referee: Christof Günsch |

| 26 January 2021 21 | SV Waldhof Mannheim | 1–0 | Dynamo Dresden | Mannheim |
| 19:00 | Garcia 90+6' (pen.) | Report | | Stadium: Carl-Benz-Stadion; Attendance: 0 Referee: Lukas Benen |

| 6 February 2021 23 | 1. FC Magdeburg | 0–1 | Dynamo Dresden | Magdeburg |
| 14:00 | | Report | Mörschel 74' | Stadium: MDCC-Arena; Attendance: 0 Referee: Florian Heft |

| 14 February 2021 24 | Dynamo Dresden | 3–1 | VfB Lübeck | Dresden |
| 14:00 | Daferner 11'; Will 24'; Kreuzer 59' | Report | Ersin Zehir 62' (pen.) | Stadium: Rudolf-Harbig-Stadion; Attendance: 0 Referee: Robert Schröder |

| 20 February 2021 25 | FSV Zwickau | 0–2 | Dynamo Dresden | Zwickau |
| 14:00 | | Report | Sohm 38'; Daferner 45+1' (pen.) | Stadium: GGZ-Arena; Attendance: 0 Referee: Patrick Kessel |

| 24 February 2021 22 | Dynamo Dresden | 1–1 | FC Bayern Munich II | Dresden |
| 19:00 | Daferner 9' | Report | Welzmüller 68' | Stadium: Rudolf-Harbig-Stadion; Attendance: 0 Referee: Steven Greif |

| 27 February 2021 26 | Dynamo Dresden | 4–0 | FC Ingolstadt 04 | Dresden |
| 14:00 | Mörschel 39'; Königsdörffer 45'; Stendera 49' (og.); Štor 90+2' | Report | | Stadium: Rudolf-Harbig-Stadion; Attendance: 0 Referee: Nicolas Winter |

| 6 March 2021 27 | SV Meppen | 0–4 | Dynamo Dresden | Meppen |
| 14:00 | | Report | Daferner 3'; Mörschel 25', 72'; Hosiner 54' (pen.) | Stadium: Hänsch-Arena; Attendance: 0 Referee: Robert Kampka |

| 13 March 2021 28 | Dynamo Dresden | 1–1 | 1. FC Saarbrücken | Dresden |
| 14:00 | Sohm 62' | Report | Zeitz 58' | Stadium: Rudolf-Harbig-Stadion; Attendance: 0 Referee: Franz Bokop |

| 17 March 2021 19 | Dynamo Dresden | 1–0 | SV Wehen Wiesbaden | Dresden |
| 19:00 | Sohm 12' | Report | | Stadium: Rudolf-Harbig-Stadion; Attendance: 0 Referee: Steven Greif |

| 22 March 2021 29 | TSV 1860 Munich | 1–0 | Dynamo Dresden | Munich |
| 19:00 | Steinhart 85' | Report | | Stadium: Stadion an der Grünwalder Straße; Attendance: 0 Referee: Benjamin Cortus |

| 4 April 2021 30 | Dynamo Dresden | 0–0 | FC Hansa Rostock | Dresden |
| 14:00 | | Report | | Stadium: Rudolf-Harbig-Stadion; Attendance: 0 Referee: Patrick Ittrich |

| 11 April 2021 31 | SpVgg Unterhaching | 2–0 | Dynamo Dresden | Unterhaching |
| 14:00 | Stephan Hain 40'; Christoph Greger 57' (pen.) | Report | | Stadium: Sportpark Unterhaching; Attendance: 0 Referee: Tobias Schultes |

| 24 April 2021 34 | Dynamo Dresden | 0–3 | Hallescher FC | Dresden |
| 14:00 | | Report | Antonios Papadopoulos 27'; Michael Eberwein 62'; Braydon Manu 78' | Stadium: Rudolf-Harbig-Stadion; Attendance: 0 Referee: Max Burda |

| 28 April 2021 32 | Dynamo Dresden | 1–0 | MSV Duisburg | Dresden |
| 19:00 | Christoph Daferner 77' | Report | | Stadium: Rudolf-Harbig-Stadion; Attendance: 0 Referee: Asmir Osmanagic |

| 1 May 2021 33 | KFC Uerdingen 05 | 0–2 | Dynamo Dresden | Lotte |
| 14:00 | | Report | Panagiotis Vlachodimos 45'; Heinz Mörschel 74' | Stadium: Stadion am Lotter Kreuz; Attendance: 0 Referee: Tom Bauer |

| 4 May 2021 35 | SC Verl | 0–0 | Dynamo Dresden | Paderborn |
| 19:00 | | Report | | Stadium: Benteler-Arena; Attendance: 0 Referee: Martin Speckner |

| 8 May 2021 36 | Dynamo Dresden | 2–0 | FC Viktoria Köln | Dresden |
| 14:00 | Mörschel 11'; Hosiner 31' (pen.) | Report | | Stadium: Rudolf-Harbig-Stadion; Attendance: 0 Referee: Franz Bokop |

| 16 May 2021 37 | Dynamo Dresden | 4–0 | Türkgücü München | Dresden |
| 14:00 | Daferner 15'; Königsdörffer 27'; Mörschel 62'; Vlachodimos 90' | Report | | Stadium: Rudolf-Harbig-Stadion; Attendance: 0 Referee: Thorben Siewer |

| 22 May 2021 38 | SV Wehen Wiesbaden | 0–1 | Dynamo Dresden | Wiesbaden |
| 13:30 | | Report | Sohm 21' | Stadium: Brita-Arena; Attendance: 0 Referee: Patrick Hanslbauer |

=== DFB-Pokal ===
| 14 September 2020 First round | Dynamo Dresden | 4–1 | Hamburger SV | Dresden |
| 18:30 | Stark 3'; Becker 16'; Daferner 53'; Mai 90+4' | Report | Onana 89' | Stadium: Rudolf-Harbig-Stadion; Attendance: 10,000; Referee: Florian Badstübner |

| 22 December 2020 Second round | Dynamo Dresden | 0–3 | SV Darmstadt 98 | Dresden |
| 20:45 | | Report | Schnellhardt 24'; Paik 59'; Dursun 71' | Stadium: Rudolf-Harbig-Stadion; Attendance: 0 Referee: Sven Jablonski |

== Player statistics ==
=== Appearances and goals ===
| No. | Pos | Nat | Player | Total | | 3. Liga | | DFB-Pokal | |
| No. | Pos | Nat | Player | Apps | Goals | Apps | Goals | Apps | Goals |
|---|---|---|---|---|---|---|---|---|---|
| 1 | GK | (Germany) GER | Kevin Broll | 36 | 0 | 34 | 0 | 2 | 0 |
| 3 | DF | (Germany) GER | Leroy Kwadwo | 8 | 0 | 8 | 0 | 0 | 0 |
| 4 | DF | (Germany) GER | Tim Knipping | 34 | 0 | 32 | 0 | 2 | 0 |
| 5 | MF | (Germany) GER | Yannick Stark | 29 | 4 | 27 | 3 | 2 | 1 |
| 6 | MF | (Germany) GER | Marco Hartmann | 8 | 2 | 8 | 2 | 0 | 0 |
| 7 | MF | (Greece) GRE | Panagiotis Vlachodimos | 12 | 1 | 11 | 1 | 1 | 0 |
| 8 | MF | (Germany) GER | Heinz Mörschel | 14 | 5 | 14 | 5 | 0 | 0 |
| 9 | FW | (Germany) GER | Pascal Sohm | 23 | 6 | 21 | 6 | 2 | 0 |
| 10 | MF | (Germany) GER | Patrick Weihrauch | 18 | 3 | 16 | 3 | 2 | 0 |
| 11 | MF | (Germany) GER | Agyemang Diawusie | 22 | 0 | 20 | 0 | 2 | 0 |
| 13 | MF | (Germany) GER | Marvin Stefaniak | 20 | 0 | 19 | 0 | 1 | 0 |
| 14 | FW | (Austria) AUT | Philipp Hosiner | 31 | 9 | 30 | 9 | 1 | 0 |
| 15 | DF | (Germany) GER | Chris Löwe | 9 | 0 | 8 | 0 | 1 | 0 |
| 16 | DF | (Germany) GER | Robin Becker | 9 | 2 | 7 | 1 | 2 | 1 |
| 17 | MF | (Germany) GER | Maximilian Großer | 5 | 0 | 4 | 0 | 1 | 0 |
| 19 | DF | (Germany) GER | Jonathan Meier | 27 | 0 | 26 | 0 | 1 | 0 |
| 20 | MF | (Germany) GER | Julius Kade | 30 | 3 | 28 | 3 | 2 | 0 |
| 22 | DF | (Germany) GER | Niklas Kreuzer | 7 | 1 | 7 | 1 | 0 | 0 |
| 23 | GK | (Germany) GER | Stefan Kiefer | 0 | 0 | 0 | 0 | 0 | 0 |
| 24 | GK | (Germany) GER | Patrick Wiegers | 0 | 0 | 0 | 0 | 0 | 0 |
| 26 | DF | (Germany) GER | Sebastian Mai | 26 | 2 | 25 | 1 | 1 | 1 |
| 27 | MF | (Germany) GER | Jonas Kühn | 2 | 0 | 2 | 0 | 0 | 0 |
| 28 | MF | (Germany) GER | Paul Will | 27 | 1 | 26 | 1 | 1 | 0 |
| 29 | MF | (Austria) AUT | Sascha Horvath | 2 | 0 | 1 | 0 | 1 | 0 |
| 33 | FW | (Germany) GER | Christoph Daferner | 36 | 12 | 34 | 11 | 2 | 1 |
| 34 | MF | (Germany) GER | Justin Löwe | 2 | 0 | 2 | 0 | 0 | 0 |
| 35 | FW | (Germany) GER | Ransford-Yeboah Königsdörffer | 31 | 6 | 29 | 6 | 2 | 0 |
| 36 | MF | (Germany) GER | Max Kulke | 6 | 0 | 5 | 0 | 1 | 0 |
| 37 | FW | (Slovenia) SVN | Luka Štor | 14 | 1 | 13 | 1 | 1 | 0 |
| 39 | DF | (Germany) GER | Kevin Ehlers | 26 | 0 | 25 | 0 | 1 | 0 |

- Last updated: 2 May 2021
