= Agyemang Diawusie =

German footballer (1998–2023)

Personal information
- Date of birth: 12 February 1998
- Place of birth: Berlin, Germany
- Date of death: 28 November 2023 (aged 25)
- Height: 1.80 m (5 ft 11 in)
- Position: Right winger

Youth career
- 2004–2006: SV Fortuna Regensburg
- 2006–2013: Jahn Regensburg
- 2014–2015: 1. FC Nürnberg
- 2015–2017: RB Leipzig

Senior career*
Years	Team	Apps	(Gls)
2015–2017	RB Leipzig II	3	(0)
2017–2018	RB Leipzig	0	(0)
2017–2018	→ Wehen Wiesbaden (loan)	35	(4)
2018–2020	FC Ingolstadt 04	11	(0)
2018	FC Ingolstadt 04 II	1	(1)
2019	→ Wehen Wiesbaden (loan)	14	(2)
2020–2022	Dynamo Dresden	38	(0)
2022–2023	SV Ried	1	(0)
2022–2023	SV Ried II	4	(0)
2023	SpVgg Bayreuth	17	(1)
2023	Jahn Regensburg	12	(0)
Total		136	(8)

International career
2016	Germany U19	1	(0)
- * Club domestic league appearances and goals

Agyemang Diawusie (12 February 1998 – 28 November 2023) was a German professional footballer who played as a right winger. He was a German youth international with an appearance for the national under-19 team. As a winger from RB Leipzig's academy, Diawusie started his professional career as a loanee at SV Wehen Wiesbaden in the 2017–18 season. He then joined FC Ingolstadt 04 and was loaned to Wehen Wiesbaden again, contributing to their promotion to the 2. Bundesliga. Stints at Dynamo Dresden and SV Ried followed, before moving to SpVgg Bayreuth for six months in January 2023. In July 2023, Diawusie returned to his former club Jahn Regensburg in the 3. Liga, who had been relegated from the second tier the season before.

== Club career ==
=== RB Leipzig ===
After initially playing in the youth department of SV Fortuna Regensburg, Diawusie moved to the academy of Jahn Regensburg. In early 2014 he joined the under-17 team of 1. FC Nürnberg, where he would score nine goals in 22 league appearances in the following year and a half. This drew the attention of the then 2. Bundesliga club RB Leipzig, who eventually signed him on a free during the summer of 2015. For the Saxons he played a total of 48 games in the Under 19 Bundesliga and scored 19 goals. In 2016, he and the team won the Saxon Under-19 Cup. In addition, he was utilised three times in Leipzig's second team.

In the summer of 2017, RB Leipzig signed Diawusie on a professional contract until 2020 and sent him on loan to 3. Liga club SV Wehen Wiesbaden for the 2017–18 season, where he had a strong debut season in professional football with four goals and eleven assists in 35 appearances.

=== FC Ingolstadt 04 ===
For the 2018–19 season, Diawusie did not return to Leipzig, but moved to 2. Bundesliga club FC Ingolstadt 04, where he signed a contract that ran until 30 June 2021. After only making one appearance before the winter break, he returned to SV Wehen Wiesbaden on loan at the end of January 2019 until the end of the season. Diawusie made 14 appearances for them in the second half of the season, in which he scored two goals and provided five assists. SV Wehen Wiesbaden took third place and met FC Ingolstadt 04 in play-offs. In order to "protect" Diawusie, he was released from SV Wehen Wiesbaden ahead of the relegation games. In the play-offs, Wehen Wiesbaden won promotion to the 2 Bundesliga. For the 2019–20 season, Diawusie returned to FC Ingolstadt 04, who had been relegated to the 3. Liga.

=== Dynamo Dresden ===
In July 2020, it was announced that Diawusie had signed a two-year contract with Dynamo Dresden. He was part of the team winning promotion to the 2. Bundesliga in the 2020–21 season.

=== SV Ried ===
After Dynamo Dresden had suffered relegation back to the 3. Liga after one season, Diawusie joined Austrian Bundesliga club SV Ried on a two-year contract. He initially played for the reserve team, making his debut as a starter on 30 July in a 3–1 away win in the Austrian Regionalliga Central against Union Vöcklamarkt. On 18 September he made his first team debut for Ried, replacing Philipp Pomer in a 3–0 league loss to Austria Wien.

Diawusie's contract with SV Ried was terminated by mutual consent on 26 January 2023, after failing to make an impact for the club. He made only one appearance for the first team.

=== SpVgg Bayreuth ===
On 27 January 2023, Diawusie signed a contract with 3. Liga club SpVgg Bayreuth until the end of the 2022–23 season. He made his debut for the club on 3 February, replacing Markus Ziereis in the 62nd minute of a 2–0 league loss to SC Freiburg II. On 18 February, he scored his first and only goal for the club to complete a late comeback for Bayreuth, slotting home a cross from Eroll Zejnullahu in the 93rd minute against VfL Osnabrück. Bayreuth suffered relegation to the Regionalliga at the end of the season, with Diawusie scoring once in 17 appearances for the Die Altstädter.

=== Jahn Regensburg ===
Despite Bayreuth's relegation, Diawusie would stay in the 3. Liga, rejoining his youth club Jahn Regensburg on 4 July 2023, who had recently been relegated from the 2. Bundesliga. He signed a two-year contract with Jahn, after impressing during pre-season trials. Upon signing, sporting director Achim Beierlorzer explained "By signing Agyemang, we gain more options for our attack. With his dynamism and technique, he is able to give our game a positive impetus. We want to work with him on his potential for improvement and bring him to the level he has in himself."

== International career ==
In 2016, Diawusie was called up for a training camp for the Germany U19 team in Spain, during which he took part in a friendly against the Czech Republic.

== Personal life and death ==
Diawusie was born on 12 February 1998 of Ghanaian descent. He died on 28 November 2023, aged 25, following a sudden cardiac arrest believed to be triggered by a viral infection, suspected to be myocarditis, as stated by his last club, Jahn Regensburg.

== Career statistics ==
Appearances and goals by club, season and competition
Club	Season	League			DFB-Pokal		Other		Total	
Club	Season	Division	Apps	Goals	Apps	Goals	Apps	Goals	Apps	Goals
RB Leipzig II	2015–16	Regionalliga Nordost	1	0	—		—		1	0
RB Leipzig II	2016–17	Regionalliga Nordost	2	0	—		—		2	0
RB Leipzig II	Total		3	0	—		—		3	0
Wehen Wiesbaden (loan)	2017–18	3. Liga	35	4	2	0	3 (Note: Appearances in Hessian Cup)	0	40	4
FC Ingolstadt 04	2018–19	2. Bundesliga	1	0	1	0	—		2	0
FC Ingolstadt 04	2019–20	3. Liga	10	0	1	0	1 (Note: Appearances in Bavarian Cup)	4	12	4
FC Ingolstadt 04	Total		11	0	2	0	1	4	14	4
FC Ingolstadt 04 II	2018–19	Regionalliga Bayern	1	1	—		—		1	1
Wehen Wiesbaden (loan)	2018–19	3. Liga	14	2	0	0	1	0	15	2
Dynamo Dresden	2020–21	3. Liga	24	0	2	0	—		26	0
Dynamo Dresden	2021–22	2. Bundesliga	14	0	2	0	2 (Note: Appearances in 2. Bundesliga relegation play-offs)	0	18	0
Dynamo Dresden	Total		38	0	4	0	2	0	44	0
SV Ried	2022–23	Austrian Bundesliga	1	0	0	0	—		1	0
SV Ried II	2022–23	Regionalliga Central	4	0	—		—		4	0
SpVgg Bayreuth	2022–23	3. Liga	17	1	—		—		17	1
Jahn Regensburg	2023–24	3. Liga	12	0	1	0	3	0	16	0
Career total			136	8	9	0	10	4	155	14

== Honours ==
Wehen Wiesbaden

- Hessian Cup: 2018–19

Dynamo Dresden

- 3. Liga: 2020–21

== See also ==
- List of association footballers who died while playing
