= Ransford-Yeboah Königsdörffer =

Footballer (born 2001)

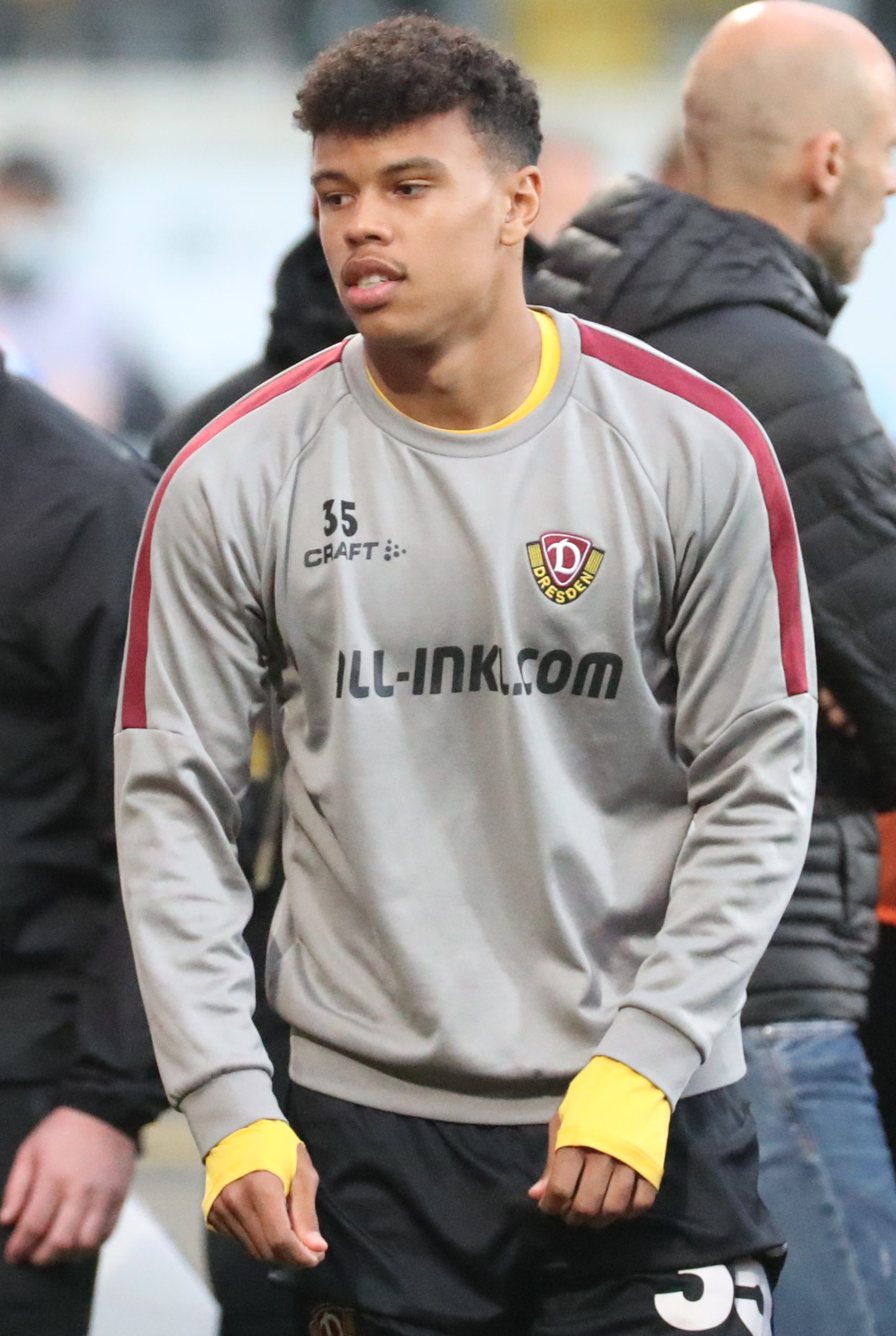
- Königsdörffer with Dynamo Dresden in 2021

Personal information
- Date of birth: 13 September 2001 (age 25)
- Place of birth: Berlin, Germany
- Height: 1.82 m (6 ft 0 in)
- Position: Right winger

Team information
- Current team: Mainz 05
- Number: 11

Youth career
- Minerva Berlin
- –2014: SCC Berlin
- 2014–2019: Hertha BSC
- 2019–2020: Dynamo Dresden

Senior career*
Years	Team	Apps	(Gls)
2020–2022	Dynamo Dresden	69	(12)
2022–2026	Hamburger SV	125	(29)
2026–	Mainz 05	8	(1)

International career^{‡}
2021	Germany U21	1	(0)
2022–	Ghana	7	(0)
- * Club domestic league appearances and goals as of 30 October 2026 ‡ National team caps and goals as of 20:22, 27 March 2026 (UTC)

Ransford-Yeboah Königsdörffer (born 13 September 2001) is a professional footballer who plays as a right winger for Bundesliga club Mainz 05. Born in Germany, he plays for the Ghana national team.

== Early and personal life ==
Königsdörffer was born in Berlin to a Ghanaian father and a German-Guadeloupean mother.

== Club career ==
=== Dynamo Dresden ===
Königsdörffer played youth football for Minerva Berlin, SCC Berlin and Hertha BSC before joining the youth setup at Dynamo Dresden in the summer of 2019. Königsdörffer made his debut for Dresden as a substitute in a 2–0 away defeat to 1. FC Nürnberg. In February 2020, Königsdörffer signed a three-year contract with Dynamo Dresden, lasting until 2022. He appeared 7 times for the club during the 2019–20 season as they finished bottom of the 2. Bundesliga and were relegated to the 3. Liga.

On 29 October 2020, his contract was further extended to 2023, before scoring his first competitive goal two days later in a 3–0 victory over SV Meppen. After providing the assist for Dresden's first goal in first-half stoppage time, he converted a Christoph Daferner cross to put Dresden 2–0 up in the 59th minute. He tested positive for COVID-19 in mid-April 2021, but returned to first-team action for a 2–0 victory over Viktoria Köln on 8 May 2021. Dynamo were promoted back to the Bundesliga as champions of the 3. Liga, with Königsdörffer having scored 7 goals in 34 appearances across the 2020–21 season.

Königsdörffer made 30 league appearances for Dynamo Dresden during the 2021–22 season, scoring 5 goals, as the club finished 16th before losing to 1. FC Kaiserslautern in the relegation play-off, and were therefore relegated to the 3. Liga.

=== Hamburger SV ===
On 28 June 2022, it was announced that Königsdörffer had signed for 2. Bundesliga club Hamburger SV on a four-year contract for a fee of €1.2 million.

=== Mainz 05 ===
On 20 May 2026, Königsdörffer moved to Mainz 05. On 6 September 2026, he scored his first goal for Mainz, against former club Hamburger SV.

== International career ==
Being born to a Ghanaian father and a German-Guadeloupean mother, Königsdörffer was able to choose to represent either the countries at international level.

On 2 September 2021, he made his official debut for the German under-21 national team, coming in as a substitute for Youssoufa Moukoko at the 73rd minute of a 6–0 win against San Marino in the 2023 European Under-21 Championship qualifiers.

In July 2022, the president of the Ghana FA, Kurt Okraku, announced that Königsdörffer was one of the few players that had officially switched allegiances to represent the Ghanaian senior national team internationally. He debuted with Ghana as a late substitute in a 1–0 friendly win over Nicaragua on 27 September 2022. He was however excluded from Ghana's 2022 World Cup squad, declaring himself "disappointed".

== Career statistics ==
=== Club ===
As of match played 30 October 2026

Appearances and goals by club, season and competition
Club	Season	League			DFB-Pokal		Other		Total	
Club	Season	Division	Apps	Goals	Apps	Goals	Apps	Goals	Apps	Goals
Dynamo Dresden	2019–20	2. Bundesliga	7	0	0	0	0	0	7	0
Dynamo Dresden	2020–21	3. Liga	32	7	2	0	0	0	34	7
Dynamo Dresden	2021–22	2. Bundesliga	30	5	2	0	2 (Note: Appearance(s) in 2. Bundesliga relegation play-offs)	0	34	5
Dynamo Dresden	Total		69	12	4	0	2	0	75	12
Hamburger SV	2022–23	2. Bundesliga	31	8	2	2	2 (Note: Appearance(s) in 2. Bundesliga promotion play-offs)	0	35	10
Hamburger SV	2023–24	2. Bundesliga	30	2	3	1	—		33	3
Hamburger SV	2024–25	2. Bundesliga	32	14	2	0	—		34	14
Hamburger SV	2025–26	Bundesliga	32	5	3	1	—		35	6
Hamburger SV	Total		125	29	10	4	2	0	137	33
Mainz 05	2026–27	Bundesliga	8	1	2	1	—		10	2
Career total			202	42	16	5	4	0	222	47

=== International ===
As of match played 27 March 2026

Appearances and goals by national team and year
National team	Year	Apps	Goals
Ghana	2022	1	0
Ghana	2023	1	0
Ghana	2024	4	0
Ghana	2026	1	0
Total		7	0
