= Seo Jong-min =

South Korean footballer (born 2002)

Personal information
- Date of birth: 9 May 2002 (age 24)
- Place of birth: Seoul, South Korea
- Height: 1.80 m (5 ft 11 in)
- Positions: Winger; attacking midfielder

Team information
- Current team: FC Ingolstadt
- Number: 7

Youth career
- 2011–2014: Eintracht Frankfurt
- 2014–2017: South Korean Middle School
- 2017–2018: SV Darmstadt 98
- 2018–2021: Eintracht Frankfurt

Senior career*
Years	Team	Apps	(Gls)
2021–2024	Dynamo Dresden	4	(0)
2022	→ Wacker Innsbruck (loan)	11	(4)
2024	Haugesund	0	(0)
2024	Haugesund 2	2	(1)
2024–2025	Chemnitzer FC	26	(8)
2025–2026	First Vienna	22	(5)
2026–	FC Ingolstadt	0	(0)
- * Club domestic league appearances and goals as of 17 May 2026

Seo Jong-min (Korean: 서종민; born 9 May 2002) is a South Korean professional footballer who plays as a winger or attacking midfielder for German 3. Liga club FC Ingolstadt.

== Career ==
A former youth academy player of Eintracht Frankfurt, Seo signed a three-year deal with Dynamo Dresden in June 2021. He made his professional debut for the club on 3 October 2021 in a 3–0 league defeat against FC St. Pauli.

On 7 February 2022, Seo was loaned to Austrian side Wacker Innsbruck until the end of the season.

On 17 January 2024, Seo signed a three-year contract with Haugesund in Norway.

On 26 September 2024, Seo joined Regionalliga Nordost club Chemnitzer FC and signed a one-year contract.

On 28 July 2025, Seo joined 2. Liga club First Vienna on a two-year deal.

On 19 June 2026, Seo returned to Germany and signed with FC Ingolstadt in 3. Liga.

== Personal life ==
Seo is the son of former South Korean footballer Seo Dong-won.

== Career statistics ==
As of 5 November 2021

Appearances and goals by club, season and competition
Club	Season	League			Cup		Continental		Total	
Club	Season	Division	Apps	Goals	Apps	Goals	Apps	Goals	Apps	Goals
Dynamo Dresden	2021–22	2. Bundesliga	3	0	1	0	—		4	0
Career total			3	0	1	0	0	0	4	0

== Honours ==
Dynamo Dresden

- Saxony Cup: 2023–24
