= Paul Will =

German footballer

Personal information
- Date of birth: 1 March 1999 (age 27)
- Place of birth: Biedenkopf, Germany
- Height: 1.85 m (6 ft 1 in)
- Position: Midfielder

Team information
- Current team: Greuther Fürth
- Number: 13

Youth career
- FV Breidenbach
- VfB Marburg
- –2015: TSG Wieseck
- 2015–2018: 1. FC Kaiserslautern

Senior career*
Years	Team	Apps	(Gls)
2018–2020	Bayern Munich II	39	(1)
2020–2024	Dynamo Dresden	122	(7)
2024–2026	Darmstadt 98	9	(0)
2026	→ Greuther Fürth (loan)	15	(0)
2026–	Greuther Fürth	0	(0)

International career
2018	Germany U20	2	(0)
- * Club domestic league appearances and goals as of 18 May 2026

Paul Will (born 1 March 1999) is a German professional footballer who plays as a midfielder for 2. Bundesliga club Greuther Fürth.

== Club career ==
Will made his professional debut in the 3. Liga for Bayern Munich II on 20 July 2019, coming on as a substitute in the 88th minute for Angelo Mayer in the away match against Würzburger Kickers, which finished as a 3–1 loss. On 22 August 2020, he joined Dynamo Dresden on a three-year contract.

On 27 May 2024, Will signed with Darmstadt 98.

On 21 January 2026, he was loaned by Greuther Fürth. On 3 July 2026, Greuther Fürth made the transfer permanent and signed a three-year contract with Will.

== International career ==
Will made his debut for the Germany national under-20 team on 7 September 2018, coming on as a substitute in the 84th minute for Manuel Wintzheimer in the friendly match against the Czech Republic, which finished as a 3–2 home win for Germany.

== Career statistics ==
=== Club ===
As of 29 November 2020

Appearances and goals by club, season and competition
Club	Season	League			Cup		Other		Total	
Club	Season	Division	Apps	Goals	Apps	Goals	Apps	Goals	Apps	Goals
Bayern Munich II	2018–19	Regionalliga Bayern	17	1	—		1 (Note: Appearance in 3. Liga promotion play-offs)	0	18	1
Bayern Munich II	2019–20	3. Liga	22	0	—		—		22	0
Bayern Munich II	Total		39	1	—		1	0	40	1
Dynamo Dresden	2020–21	3. Liga	10	0	1	0	0	0	11	0
Career total			49	1	1	0	1	0	51	1
