= Jürgen Press =

German football manager

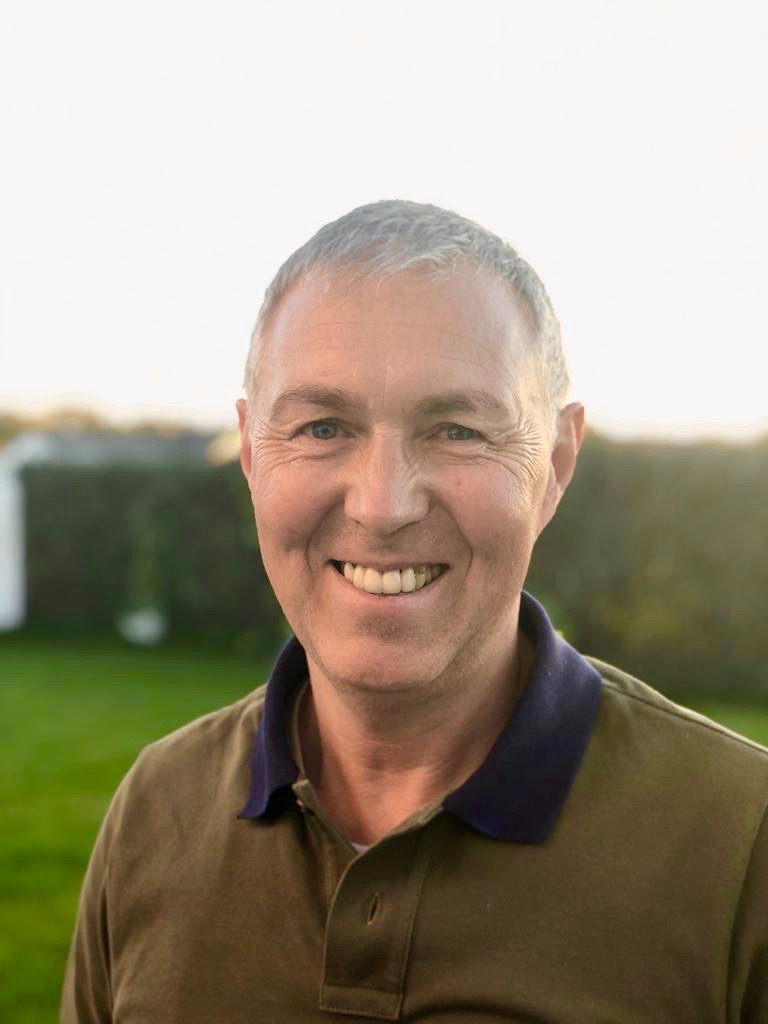
- Press in 2019

Personal information
- Date of birth: 31 October 1965 (age 60)
- Place of birth: Ingolstadt, West Germany

Team information
- Current team: Uerdingen 05 (manager)

Managerial career
- Years: Team
- 2004–2008: FC Ingolstadt 04
- 2009–2010: Wacker Burghausen
- 2019–2020: Deportes Valdivia
- 2021: Uerdingen 05

Jürgen Press (born 31 October 1965) is a German football manager who most recently managed Uerdingen 05.

== Managerial career ==
=== FC Ingolstadt 04 ===
FC Ingolstadt 04, a newly formed club, started pre–season on 25 June 2004. They played 34 Oberliga matches over 38 matchdays. The first match of the 2004–05 season was a 0–0 draw against SC 04 Schwabach on 31 July 2004. They defeated 1. FC Nürnberg II and FC Ismaning to open the season on a three match undefeated streak (two wind and a draw). The club's first loss of the season was a 2–1 result on 14 August 2004 against FC Memmingen. They then went on a six–match winning streak. Their biggest win was a 5–1 result on 19 April 2005 against SpVgg Weiden. They finished the season, in second place, a point behind SpVgg Bayreuth.

The 2005–06 season started with a 3–1 win against Ismaning on 30 July 2005. On 20 August 2005, Ingolstadt were knocked out of the German Cup in a shoot–out against 1. FC Saarbrücken. They finished the season in first place; 11 points above 1. FC Nürnberg II.

The 2006–07 season was played in the Regionalliga Süd and started on 5 August 2006 with a 3–0 loss against Saarbrücken. During the season, they defeated Hessen Kassel 5–0 and 1. FC Kaiserslautern II 4–0. However, they lost to Saarbrücken for the second time during the season. This time the result was 6–0. They finished the season in fifth place.

They started the 2007–08 season with a 3–2 loss to Stuttgarter Kickers on 27 July 2007. Press was sacked on 1 January 2008 and was replaced by Thorsten Fink three days later. His final match was a 1–1 draw against SV Elversberg on 8 December 2007.

=== Wacker Burghausen ===
Press was hired on 8 June 2009 to be the manager of Wacker Burghausen. It was a combined role of head coach and management. His first match and win was a 4–3 result against Borussia Dortmund II. His first loss came in a 2–0 loss to Eintracht Braunschweig on 15 August 2009.

He started the 2010–11 season with a 4–1 loss on 24 July 2010. Then Burghausen followed with a pair of 1–1 draws against Bayern Munich II on 31 July 2010 and Wehen Wiesbaden on 4 August 2010. Press was sacked on 11 August 2010 and was replaced by Mario Basler. His final match was a 2–0 loss to Jahn Regensburg on 7 August 2010.

=== KFC Uerdingen ===
He was appointed as the head coach of Uerdingen 05 on 30 April, for the remainder of the 2020–21 season.

== Managerial record ==
As of 18 March 2015

Team	From	To	Record								
Team	From	To	M	W	D	L	GF	GA	GD	Win %	Ref.
FC Ingolstadt 04	25 June 2004	1 January 2008	122	64	30	28	205	140	+65	52.46	
Wacker Burghausen	8 June 2009	11 August 2010	43	13	10	20	49	73	−24	30.23	
Total			165	77	40	48	254	213	+41	46.67	—
