= Jonathan Meier =

German footballer

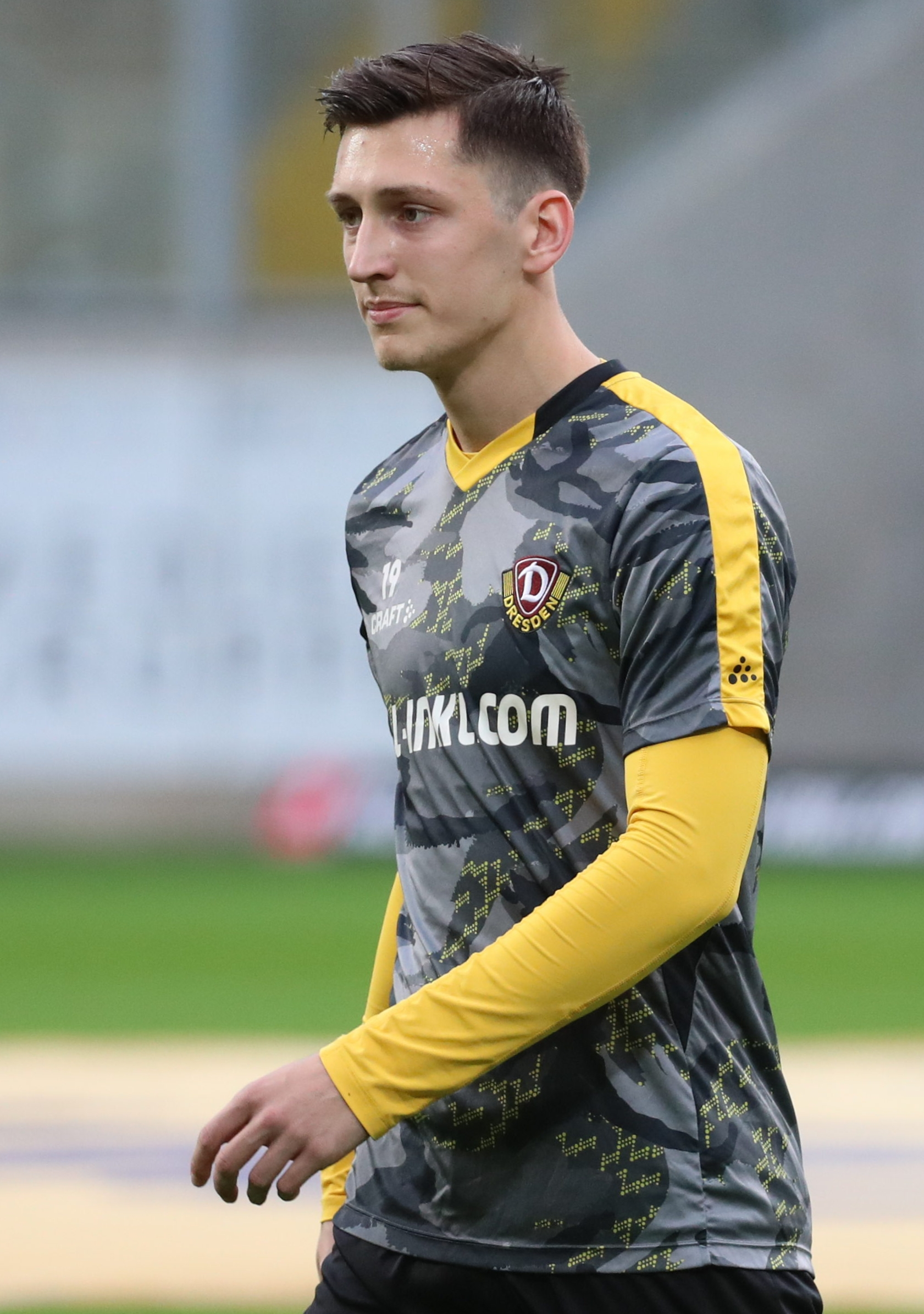
- Meier in 2021

Personal information
- Date of birth: 11 November 1999 (age 27)
- Place of birth: Munich, Germany
- Height: 1.81 m (5 ft 11 in)
- Position: Left-back

Team information
- Current team: Kilmarnock
- Number: 19

Youth career
- –2012: 1860 Munich
- 2012–2018: Bayern Munich

Senior career*
Years	Team	Apps	(Gls)
2018–2019	Bayern Munich II	19	(0)
2019–2022	Mainz 05 II	11	(0)
2019–2022	Mainz 05	0	(0)
2020–2021	→ Dynamo Dresden (loan)	28	(0)
2021–2022	→ Hansa Rostock (loan)	18	(0)
2022–2024	Dynamo Dresden	61	(0)
2024–2026	SSV Ulm	41	(0)
2026–	Kilmarnock	0	(0)
- * Club domestic league appearances and goals as of 31 July 2026

Jonathan Meier (born 11 November 1999) is a German professional footballer who plays as a left-back for Scottish Premiership club Kilmarnock.

== Career ==
Meier made his professional debut for Dynamo Dresden in the 3. Liga on 18 September 2020, starting in the away match against 1. FC Kaiserslautern.

On 14 August 2021, he joined Hansa Rostock on loan.

On 11 June 2022, Meier agreed to return to Dynamo Dresden on a two-year deal.

On 12 June 2024, Meier signed a two-season contract with SSV Ulm.

On 31 July 2026, Meier signed a two year deal with Kilmarnock in the Scottish Premiership, becoming the first German player to sign for the club.

== Career statistics ==
As of match played 24 February 2021

Appearances and goals by club, season and competition
Club	Season	League			National Cup		Total	
Club	Season	Division	Apps	Goals	Apps	Goals	Apps	Goals
Bayern Munich II	2018–19	Regionalliga Bayern	19	0	—		19	0
Mainz 05	2019–20	Regionalliga Südwest	11	0	—		11	0
Dynamo Dresden (loan)	2020–21	3. Liga	20	0	1	0	21	0
Career total			50	0	1	0	51	0
