= Yannic Voigt =

German footballer (born 2002)

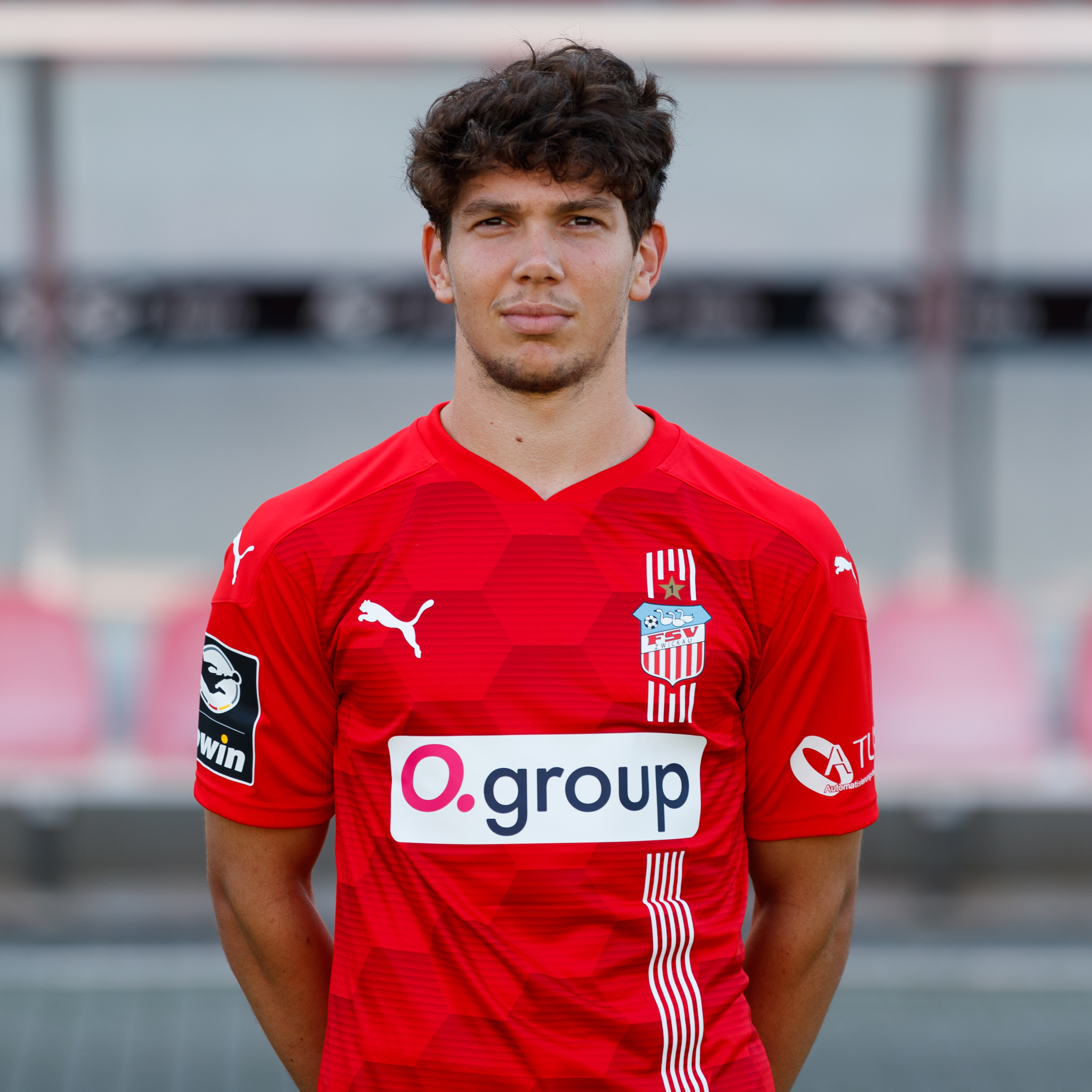
- Voigt with FSV Zwickau in July 2021

Personal information
- Date of birth: 27 October 2002 (age 24)
- Place of birth: Rodewisch, Germany
- Height: 1.76 m (5 ft 9 in)
- Position: Midfielder

Team information
- Current team: VfB Auerbach
- Number: 8

Youth career
- 2015–2017: Erzgebirge Aue
- 2017–2020: VfB Auerbach

Senior career*
Years	Team	Apps	(Gls)
2020–2021	VfB Auerbach	11	(3)
2021–2025	FSV Zwickau	77	(5)
2025–	VfB Auerbach	6	(1)
- * Club domestic league appearances and goals as of 22 February 2026

Yannic Voigt (born 27 October 2002) is a German professional footballer who plays as a midfielder for NOFV-Oberliga Süd club VfB Auerbach.

== Career ==
Voigt was born in Rodewisch.

After playing youth football for Erzgebirge Aue and VfB Auerbach, Voigt started his senior career at Auerbach, making 11 appearances and scoring three goals during the 2020–21 season. On 14 June 2021, he signed for 3. Liga club FSV Zwickau on a two-year contract.

In the summer of 2025, he returned to VfB Auerbach.
