= Pascal Sohm =

German footballer

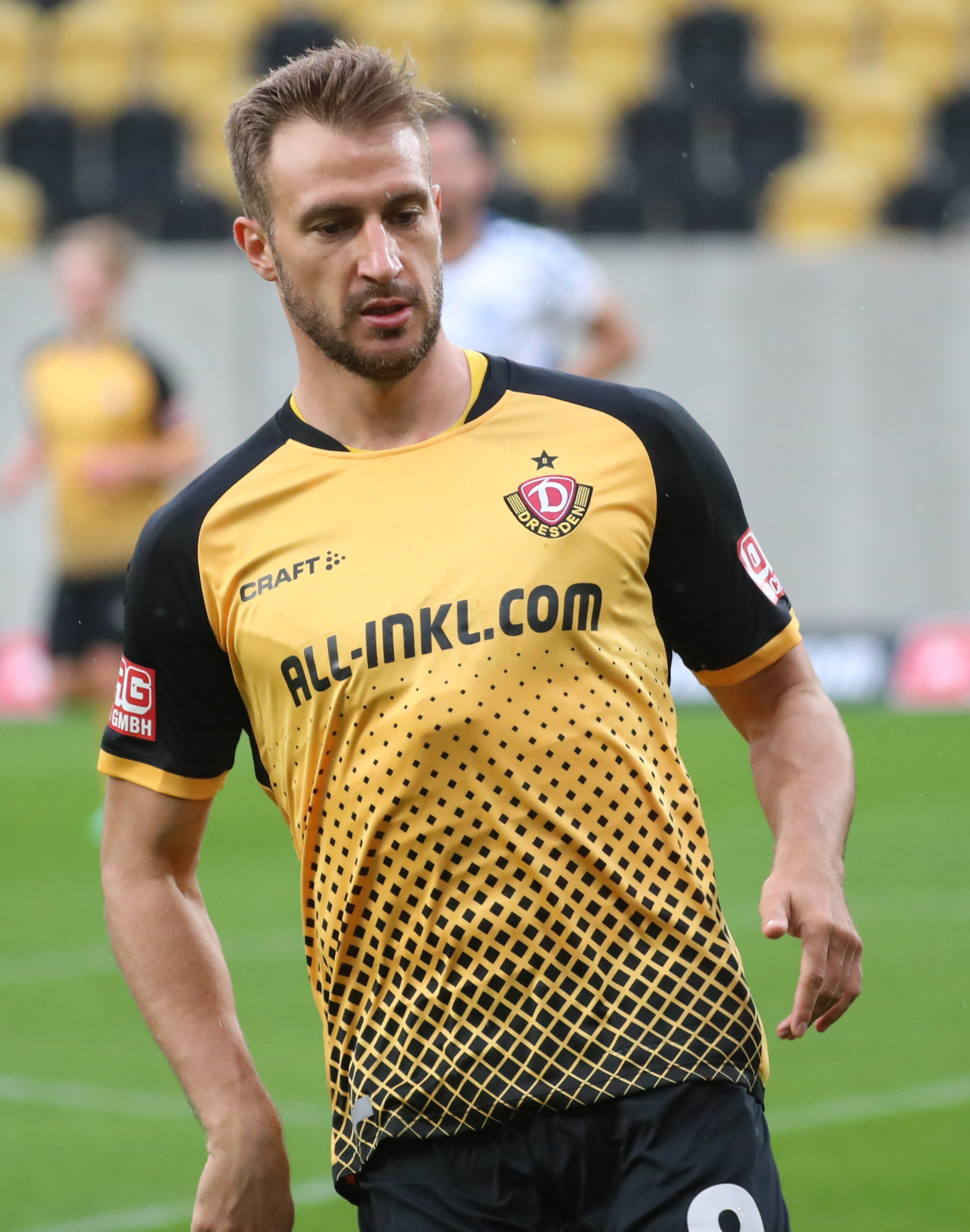
- Sohm with Dynamo Dresden in 2021

Personal information
- Date of birth: 2 November 1991 (age 35)
- Place of birth: Künzelsau, Germany
- Height: 1.86 m (6 ft 1 in)
- Position: Midfielder

Youth career
- TSV Crailsheim
- FSV Hollenbach

Senior career*
Years	Team	Apps	(Gls)
2009–2013	FSV Hollenbach	81	(19)
2013–2014	SSV Ulm	33	(6)
2014–2018	Sonnenhof Großaspach	98	(10)
2018–2020	Hallescher FC	57	(13)
2020–2022	Dynamo Dresden	31	(7)
2022–2024	Waldhof Mannheim	81	(15)
- * Club domestic league appearances and goals as of 22 May 2024

Pascal Sohm (born 2 November 1991) is a German professional footballer who plays as a midfielder.

== Career ==
Sohm was born in Künzelsau, Baden-Württemberg, and started playing for the FSV Hollenbach first team in 2009. The following year, the team won the Verbandsliga Württemberg and promoted to the Oberliga Baden-Württemberg. There Sohm distinguished himself regularly as a goalscorer in the following three seasons. In the summer of 2013, Sohm moved to SSV Ulm 1846 in the Regionalliga Südwest. There, he immediately established himself as a regular starter and scored six goals in his first season. SSV Ulm were denied a license for the Regionalliga at the end of the 2013–14 season and Sohm moved to Sonnenhof Großaspach, competing in the 3. Liga, after a successful trial. In 2018, Sohm moved to Hallescher FC. In July 2020, he signed with Dynamo Dresden.

On 13 January 2022, Sohm moved to Waldhof Mannheim.

== Honours ==
FSV Hollenbach

- Verbandsliga Württemberg: 2009–10

Hallescher FC

- Saxony-Anhalt Cup: 2018–19

Dynamo Dresden

- 3. Liga: 2020–21
