= 2020–21 3. Liga =

13th season of the 3. Liga

3. Liga
- Season: 2020–21
- Dates: 18 September 2020 – 22 May 2021
- Champions: Dynamo Dresden
- Promoted: Dynamo Dresden; Hansa Rostock; FC Ingolstadt
- Relegated: KFC Uerdingen; Bayern Munich II; VfB Lübeck; SpVgg Unterhaching
- Matches: 380
- Goals: 1,015 (2.67 per match)
- Top goalscorer: Sascha Mölders (22 goals)
- Biggest home win: 1860 Munich 6–1 Halle; 1860 Munich 5–0 Mannheim; 1. FC Saarbrücken 5–0 Mannheim
- Biggest away win: Uerdingen 0–4 Wiesbaden; Duisburg 0–4 Verl; Halle 0–4 Bayern Munich II; Magdeburg 0–4 Verl; Meppen 0–4 Dresden; Halle 0–4 1860 Munich; Meppen 0–4 Uerdingen; Bayern Munich II 0–4 Saarbrücken
- Highest scoring: Mannheim 4–4 Türkgücü
- Longest winning run: 5 games Hansa Rostock; Wiesbaden
- Longest unbeaten run: 10 games Viktoria Köln; Magdeburg; Wiesbaden
- Longest winless run: 12 games Bayern Munich II; Unterhaching
- Longest losing run: 7 games Unterhaching
- Attendance: 133,125 (350 per match) (Note: Due to the COVID-19 pandemic in Germany, each local health department allows a different number of spectators.)

The 2020–21 3. Liga was the 13th season of the 3. Liga. It began on 18 September 2020 and concluded on 22 May 2021. The season was originally scheduled to begin on 24 July 2020 and conclude on 15 May 2021, though this was delayed due to postponement of the previous season as a result of the COVID-19 pandemic.

The fixtures were announced on 20 August 2020.

Dynamo Dresden and Hansa Rostock got promoted directly, while FC Ingolstadt won the promotion play-offs. Originally, SV Meppen, Bayern Munich II, VfB Lübeck and SpVgg Unterhaching were relegated; however, KFC Uerdingen was unable to obtain a 3. Liga license for the 2021–22 season and was therefore relegated, sparing SV Meppen from relegation.

== Effects of the COVID-19 pandemic ==
Unlike other competitions organised by the DFB and DFL, the clubs of the 3. Liga initially voted to allow for only three substitutes during the 2020–21 season. Five substitutions were permitted in the 3. Liga at the end of the previous season to lessen the impact of fixture congestion caused by the COVID-19 pandemic, and competition organisers had the option to use the rule until 2021. On 11 January 2021, the DFB Executive Committee approved the use of five substitutions for the second half of the season from 22 January (matchday 20 onward), following a secondary vote by the 20 clubs. However, the number of players permitted on the bench remained at seven. Rescheduled matches from the first half of the season (matchday 19 and earlier) remained limited to three substitutions.

== Teams ==
Locations of the 2020–21 3. Liga teams

=== Team changes ===
Promoted from 2019–20 Regionalliga	Relegated from 2019–20 2. Bundesliga	Promoted to 2020–21 2. Bundesliga	Relegated from 2019–20 3. Liga
VfB Lübeck; Türkgücü München; 1. FC Saarbrücken; SC Verl	Wehen Wiesbaden; Dynamo Dresden	Würzburger Kickers; Eintracht Braunschweig	Chemnitzer FC; Preußen Münster; Sonnenhof Großaspach; Carl Zeiss Jena

=== Stadiums and locations ===
Team	Location	Stadium	Capacity
Dynamo Dresden	Dresden	Rudolf-Harbig-Stadion	32,066
MSV Duisburg	Duisburg	Schauinsland-Reisen-Arena	31,500
Hallescher FC	Halle	Erdgas Sportpark	15,057
FC Ingolstadt	Ingolstadt	Audi Sportpark	15,000
1. FC Kaiserslautern	Kaiserslautern	Fritz-Walter-Stadion	49,780
Viktoria Köln	Cologne	Sportpark Höhenberg	10,001
VfB Lübeck	Lübeck	Stadion Lohmühle	17,849
1. FC Magdeburg	Magdeburg	MDCC-Arena	27,500
Waldhof Mannheim	Mannheim	Carl-Benz-Stadion	25,667
SV Meppen	Meppen	Hänsch-Arena	16,500
1860 Munich	Munich	Grünwalder Stadion	15,000
Bayern Munich II	Munich	Grünwalder Stadion; FC Bayern Campus^{1}	15,000; 2,500
Türkgücü München	Munich	Olympiastadion^{2} Grünwalder Stadion	69,250; 15,000
Hansa Rostock	Rostock	Ostseestadion	29,000
1. FC Saarbrücken	Saarbrücken; Frankfurt; Völklingen	Ludwigsparkstadion; PSD Bank Arena; Hermann-Neuberger-Stadion^{3}	16,003; 12,542; 6,800
KFC Uerdingen	Düsseldorf; Lotte	Merkur Spiel-Arena; Stadion am Lotter Kreuz^{4}	54,600; 10,059
SpVgg Unterhaching	Unterhaching	Sportpark Unterhaching	15,053
SC Verl	Verl; Paderborn	Sportclub Arena; Benteler-Arena^{5}	5,153; 15,000
Wehen Wiesbaden	Wiesbaden	BRITA-Arena	12,250
FSV Zwickau	Zwickau	GGZ-Arena Zwickau	10,049

^{1} Bayern Munich II will play their home match against 1. FC Magdeburg at FC Bayern Campus to take strain off the Grünwalder Stadion, since it is being used by three teams and would have to host four matches in one week otherwise.
^{2} Türkgücü München will play up to eight of their home matches at the Olympiastadion and the remainder at the Grünwalder Stadion.
^{3} 1. FC Saarbrücken played their home match against VfB Lübeck at the PSD Bank Arena in Frankfurt and their home match against 1860 Munich at the Hermann-Neuberger-Stadion in Völklingen because their regular home stadium was rendered unusable due to snowfall.
^{4} KFC Uerdingen played their first ten home matches at the Merkur Spiel-Arena in Düsseldorf while their home stadium, the Grotenburg-Stadion in Krefeld, is being renovated. The club moved to the Stadion am Lotter Kreuz in Lotte for the rest of the season since they could no longer afford to pay the rent for the Merkur Spiel-Arena.
^{5} SC Verl will play their home matches at the Benteler-Arena since their home stadium, the Sportclub Arena in Verl, did not meet 3. Liga standards. As only a limited number of spectators was permitted, the DFB allowed Verl to play three matches in their home stadium.

=== Personnel and kits ===
Team	Manager	Captain	Kit manufacturer	Shirt sponsor	Sleeve sponsor
Dynamo Dresden	(Germany) Alexander Schmidt	(Germany) Sebastian Mai	Craft	ALL-INKL.COM	AOK Plus
MSV Duisburg	(Bulgaria) Pavel Dochev	(Germany) Moritz Stoppelkamp	Capelli	Iberostar Group	Rheinpower
Hallescher FC	(Germany) Florian Schnorrenberg	(Germany) Jonas Nietfeld	Puma	sunmaker	Autohaus König
FC Ingolstadt	(Germany) Tomas Oral	(Germany) Stefan Kutschke	Puma	PROSIS	Audi Schanzer Fußballschule
1. FC Kaiserslautern	(Germany) Marco Antwerpen	(Germany) Carlo Sickinger	Nike	Allgäuer Latschenkiefer	
Viktoria Köln	(Germany) Olaf Janßen	(Germany) Mike Wunderlich	Puma	ETL	Wintec Autoglas
VfB Lübeck	(Austria) Rolf Landerl	(Germany) Tommy Grupe	Hummel	Hansebelt	Mayo Feinkost
1. FC Magdeburg	(Germany) Christian Titz	(Germany) Tobias Müller	Uhlsport	sunmaker	SWM Magdeburg
Waldhof Mannheim	(Germany) Patrick Glöckner	(Germany) Kevin Conrad	Capelli	sunmaker	
SV Meppen	(Germany) Mario Neumann	(Germany) Thilo Leugers	Nike	KiK xxl	Echt Emsland
1860 Munich	(Germany) Michael Köllner	(Germany) Sascha Mölders	Nike	Die Bayerische	Bet3000
Bayern Munich II	(Germany) Holger Seitz	(Germany) Nicolas Feldhahn	Adidas	Magenta Sport	Tipico
Türkgücü München	(Germany) Andreas Pummer	(Turkey) Sercan Sararer	Capelli	Yayla	
Hansa Rostock	(Germany) Jens Härtel	(Germany) Markus Kolke	Nike	sunmaker	SoftClean
1. FC Saarbrücken	(Poland) Lukas Kwasniok	(Germany) Manuel Zeitz	Adidas	Victor's	Lotto Saartoto
KFC Uerdingen	(Germany) Jürgen Press / (Germany) Stefan Reisinger	(Democratic Republic of the Congo) Assani Lukimya	Capelli	SWK	
SpVgg Unterhaching	(Netherlands) Arie van Lent	(Germany) Josef Welzmüller	Adidas	frostkrone	Süd-Hansa
SC Verl	(Germany) Guerino Capretti	(Germany) Julian Stöckner	Joma	Beckhoff	Frankenfeld
Wehen Wiesbaden	(Germany) Rüdiger Rehm	(Poland) Sebastian Mrowca	Capelli	Brita	
FSV Zwickau	(United States) Joe Enochs	(Germany) Johannes Brinkies	Puma	sunmaker	ATUS

=== Managerial changes ===
Team	Outgoing	Manner	Exit date		Position in table	Incoming	Incoming date		Ref.
Team	Outgoing	Manner	Announced on	Departed on	Position in table	Incoming	Announced on	Arrived on	Ref.
Türkgücü München	(Germany) Reiner Maurer	End of contract	1 June 2020	31 May 2020	Pre-season	(Germany) Alexander Schmidt	26 June 2020		
SV Meppen	(Germany) Christian Neidhart	Mutual consent	19 June 2020	4 July 2020	Pre-season	(Germany) Torsten Frings	14 July 2020		
Waldhof Mannheim	(Germany) Bernhard Trares	End of contract	1 July 2020	4 July 2020	Pre-season	(Germany) Patrick Glöckner	20 July 2020		
Bayern Munich II	(Germany) Sebastian Hoeneß	Signed for 1899 Hoffenheim	27 July 2020		Pre-season	(Germany) Holger Seitz	25 August 2020		
SpVgg Unterhaching	(Germany) Claus Schromm	Moved to sporting director	29 July 2020		Pre-season	(Netherlands) Arie van Lent	18 August 2020		
1. FC Kaiserslautern	(Germany) Boris Schommers	Sacked	29 September 2020		20th	(Luxembourg) Jeff Saibene	2 October 2020		
MSV Duisburg	(Germany) Torsten Lieberknecht	Sacked	10 November 2020		17th	(Italy) Gino Lettieri	11 November 2020	15 November 2020	
Viktoria Köln	(Bulgaria) Pavel Dochev	Sacked	24 January 2021		13th	(Germany) Daniel Zillken / (Germany) Markus Brzenska (interim)	24 January 2021		
MSV Duisburg	(Italy) Gino Lettieri	Sacked	27 January 2021		19th	(Germany) Uwe Schubert (interim)	27 January 2021		
1. FC Kaiserslautern	(Luxembourg) Jeff Saibene	Sacked	30 January 2021		16th	(Germany) Marco Antwerpen	1 February 2021		
MSV Duisburg	(Germany) Uwe Schubert (interim)	End of caretaker spell	2 February 2021		19th	(Bulgaria) Pavel Dochev	2 February 2021		
1. FC Magdeburg	(Germany) Thomas Hoßmang	Sacked	9 February 2021		19th	(Germany) Christian Titz	12 February 2021		
Türkgücü München	(Germany) Alexander Schmidt	Sacked	9 February 2021		7th	(Germany) Andreas Pummer (interim)	9 February 2021		
Türkgücü München	(Germany) Andreas Pummer (interim)	End of caretaker	23 February 2021		5th	(Turkey) Serdar Dayat	23 February 2021		
Viktoria Köln	(Germany) Daniel Zillken / (Germany) Markus Brzenska (interim)	End of caretaker	1 February 2021		14th	(Germany) Olaf Janßen	1 February 2021		
Bayern Munich II	(Germany) Holger Seitz	Moving to campus sporting director	2 April 2021	4 April 2021	15th	(Argentina) Martín Demichelis / (Germany) Danny Schwarz	2 April 2021	4 April 2021	
KFC Uerdingen	(Germany) Stefan Krämer	Sacked	13 April 2021		17h	(Germany) Jürgen Press / (Germany) Stefan Reisinger (interim)	13 April 2021		
SV Meppen	(Germany) Torsten Frings	Sacked	14 April 2021		15th	(Germany) Mario Neumann (interim)	14 April 2021		
SV Meppen	(Germany) Mario Neumann (interim)	End of caretaker spell	20 April 2021		15th	(Germany) Rico Schmitt	20 April 2021		
Dynamo Dresden	(Germany) Markus Kauczinski	Sacked	25 April 2021		4th	(Germany) Alexander Schmidt	26 April 2021		
Türkgücü München	(Turkey) Serdar Dayat	Mutual consent	6 May 2021		10th	(Germany) Andreas Pummer (interim)	6 May 2021		

== League table ==
Pos	Team	Pld	W	D	L	GF	GA	GD	Pts	Qualification or relegation
1	Dynamo Dresden (C, P)	38	23	6	9	61	29	+32	75	Promotion to 2. Bundesliga and qualification for DFB-Pokal
2	Hansa Rostock (P)	38	20	11	7	52	33	+19	71	Promotion to 2. Bundesliga and qualification for DFB-Pokal
3	FC Ingolstadt (O, P)	38	20	11	7	56	40	+16	71	Qualification for promotion play-offs and DFB-Pokal
4	1860 Munich	38	18	12	8	69	35	+34	66	Qualification for DFB-Pokal
5	1. FC Saarbrücken	38	16	11	11	66	51	+15	59	
6	Wehen Wiesbaden	38	15	11	12	57	53	+4	56	
7	SC Verl	38	14	13	11	66	55	+11	55	
8	Waldhof Mannheim	38	13	13	12	50	55	−5	52	
9	Hallescher FC	38	14	10	14	51	58	−7	52	
10	FSV Zwickau	38	13	12	13	46	45	+1	51	
11	1. FC Magdeburg	38	14	9	15	42	45	−3	51	
12	Viktoria Köln	38	13	12	13	52	59	−7	51	
13	Türkgücü München	38	12	11	15	45	55	−10	47	
14	1. FC Kaiserslautern	38	8	19	11	47	52	−5	43	
15	MSV Duisburg	38	11	10	17	52	67	−15	43	
16	KFC Uerdingen (Note: KFC Uerdingen were deducted three points, after they filed for insolvency.) (R)	38	11	11	16	38	50	−12	41	Relegation to Regionalliga (Note: KFC Uerdingen did not obtain a license for the next season and was therefore relegated, sparing SV Meppen from relegation.)
17	SV Meppen	38	12	5	21	37	61	−24	41	
18	Bayern Munich II (Note: Reserve teams are ineligible for promotion or DFB-Pokal qualification.) (R)	38	8	13	17	47	58	−11	37	Relegation to Regionalliga
19	VfB Lübeck (R)	38	8	11	19	41	57	−16	35	Relegation to Regionalliga
20	SpVgg Unterhaching (R)	38	9	5	24	40	57	−17	32	Relegation to Regionalliga

Source: DFB
Rules for classification: 1) Points; 2) Goal difference; 3) Goals scored; 4) Head-to-head results; 5) Head-to-head away goals scored; 6) Away goals scored; 7) Play-off.
(C) Champions; (O) Play-off winners; (P) Promoted; (R) Relegated

== Results ==
Home \ Away	DRE	DUI	HAL	ING	KAI	KÖL	LÜB	MAG	MAN	MEP	MUN	MU2	ROS	SAA	TÜR	UER	UNT	VER	WIE	ZWI
Dynamo Dresden	—	1–0	0–3	4–0	4–3	2–0	3–1	1–0	1–1	3–0	2–1	1–1	0–0	1–1	4–0	0–0	2–0	4–1	1–0	1–2
MSV Duisburg	0–3	—	0–0	1–5	2–2	1–3	3–1	1–2	1–1	1–0	1–0	2–2	1–2	2–3	3–2	0–2	2–1	0–4	4–1	1–1
Hallescher FC	1–3	1–1	—	0–2	1–1	2–0	2–1	1–0	0–0	4–1	0–4	0–4	1–1	1–1	4–1	2–1	2–0	1–1	4–0	0–2
FC Ingolstadt	1–0	2–1	1–1	—	1–0	2–1	1–1	1–0	1–0	0–0	3–1	2–2	1–0	0–0	2–1	2–1	0–1	2–1	4–1	3–2
1. FC Kaiserslautern	0–1	2–2	3–1	1–1	—	0–0	1–0	1–1	1–1	2–2	0–3	1–1	0–0	2–1	0–0	4–1	3–2	1–1	0–1	2–2
Viktoria Köln	2–4	3–1	2–0	2–0	3–3	—	0–2	2–4	1–2	1–0	2–1	3–2	1–2	0–2	0–2	0–2	1–1	2–2	0–2	1–1
VfB Lübeck	0–1	1–1	2–3	1–1	1–1	1–2	—	1–1	0–1	0–2	0–0	3–0	1–0	1–1	0–2	1–0	1–0	2–2	0–3	1–2
1. FC Magdeburg	0–1	3–2	0–2	2–0	1–0	0–2	1–0	—	1–1	0–0	0–3	2–1	1–1	1–2	2–0	1–1	1–1	0–4	1–2	0–0
Waldhof Mannheim	1–0	2–2	3–2	4–1	0–2	2–2	3–2	5–2	—	0–1	0–2	2–2	1–2	4–1	4–4	1–1	1–4	2–2	0–1	1–0
SV Meppen	0–4	2–1	2–1	2–0	3–2	0–1	0–2	1–2	2–0	—	1–3	2–1	2–3	1–0	1–4	0–4	3–2	1–2	0–3	1–2
1860 Munich	1–0	0–2	6–1	1–0	3–0	1–1	4–1	1–1	5–0	1–1	—	2–2	0–0	1–2	2–2	0–0	3–1	3–2	2–2	0–1
Bayern Munich II	3–0	1–1	0–1	1–3	0–0	0–1	2–3	0–2	2–0	2–0	0–2	—	0–1	0–4	2–2	0–1	1–2	1–2	2–0	3–2
Hansa Rostock	1–3	3–1	1–0	1–1	2–1	5–1	1–1	0–2	1–0	0–2	1–1	2–0	—	4–2	2–0	0–0	1–0	3–2	1–1	0–0
1. FC Saarbrücken	2–1	4–1	4–0	3–3	1–1	2–3	0–0	0–3	5–0	2–0	2–1	1–2	2–0	—	2–1	2–2	2–1	1–2	3–3	1–2
Türkgücü München	1–0	2–1	0–3	1–1	3–0	1–1	4–3	2–1	0–2	2–0	0–2	0–0	0–3	1–1	—	0–2	0–0	1–2	0–0	1–1
KFC Uerdingen	0–2	1–2	0–1	0–3	0–2	1–1	1–1	1–0	1–1	0–2	1–3	1–1	0–1	1–0	1–0	—	3–1	1–2	0–4	1–1
SpVgg Unterhaching	2–0	0–1	3–0	0–1	2–0	2–2	1–0	0–2	0–2	2–1	0–2	1–1	0–1	0–1	0–2	2–3	—	3–4	2–1	1–2
SC Verl	0–0	1–2	4–2	1–1	1–1	1–1	1–2	3–1	0–1	3–1	1–1	3–0	2–3	1–3	0–1	3–0	2–1	—	2–2	1–1
Wehen Wiesbaden	0–1	0–3	1–1	1–2	2–2	2–2	4–2	1–0	0–1	1–0	1–1	2–4	2–1	2–2	3–1	3–1	1–0	0–0	—	3–1
FSV Zwickau	0–2	3–1	2–2	0–2	1–2	1–2	2–1	0–1	0–0	0–0	1–2	1–1	0–2	2–0	0–1	1–2	2–1	3–0	2–1	—

Source: DFB
Legend: Blue = home team win; Yellow = draw; Red = away team win.

== Top scorers ==
Rank	Player	Club	Goals
1	(Germany) Sascha Mölders	1860 Munich	22
2	(United States) Terrence Boyd	Hallescher FC	18
3	(Bosnia and Herzegovina) Zlatko Janjić	SC Verl	14
3	(Germany) Nicklas Shipnoski	1. FC Saarbrücken	14
3	(Germany) Aygün Yıldırım	SC Verl	14
6	(Germany) Stefan Kutschke	FC Ingolstadt	13
6	(Croatia) Dominik Martinović	Waldhof Mannheim	13
6	(Croatia) Petar Slišković	Türkgücü München	13
9	(Germany) Christoph Daferner	Dynamo Dresden	12
9	(Germany) Maurice Malone	Wehen Wiesbaden	12
9	(Netherlands) John Verhoek	Hansa Rostock	12

== Number of teams by state ==
Position	State	Number of teams	Teams
1	Bavaria	5	FC Ingolstadt, Bayern Munich II, 1860 Munich, Türkgücü München and SpVgg Unterhaching
2	North Rhine-Westphalia	4	MSV Duisburg, Viktoria Köln, KFC Uerdingen and SC Verl
3	Saxony	2	Dynamo Dresden and FSV Zwickau
3	Saxony-Anhalt	2	Hallescher FC and 1. FC Magdeburg
5	Baden-Württemberg	1	Waldhof Mannheim
5	Hesse	1	Wehen Wiesbaden
5	Lower Saxony	1	SV Meppen
5	Mecklenburg-Vorpommern	1	Hansa Rostock
5	Rhineland-Palatinate	1	1. FC Kaiserslautern
5	Saarland	1	1. FC Saarbrücken
5	Schleswig-Holstein	1	VfB Lübeck
