= Julius Kade =

German footballer

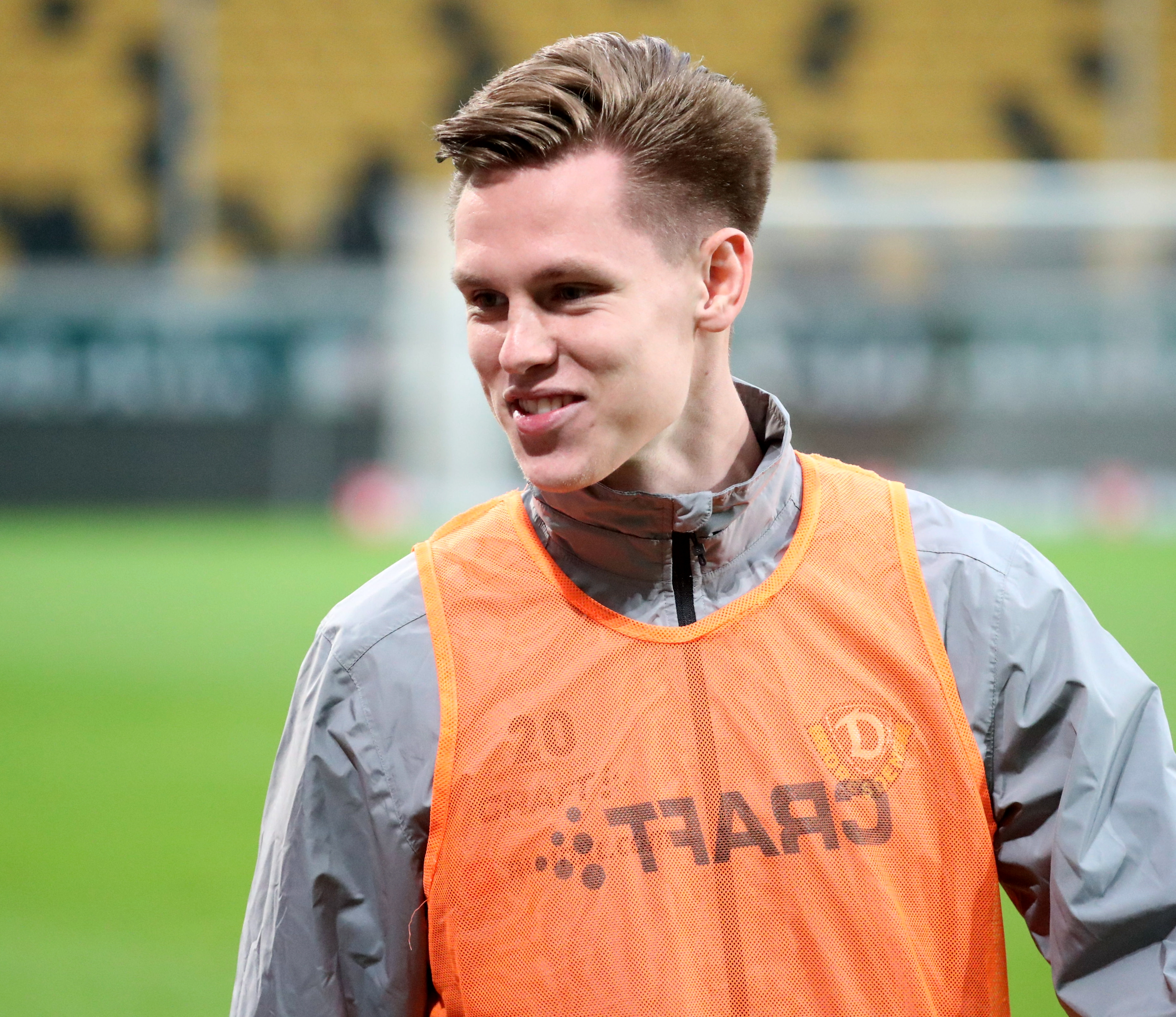
- Kade in 2021

Personal information
- Date of birth: 20 May 1999 (age 27)
- Place of birth: Berlin, Germany
- Height: 1.82 m (6 ft 0 in)
- Position: Midfielder

Youth career
- –2008: Sportfreunde Kladow
- 2008–2017: Hertha BSC

Senior career*
Years	Team	Apps	(Gls)
2016–2019	Hertha BSC II	13	(5)
2016–2019	Hertha BSC	1	(0)
2019–2020	Union Berlin	0	(0)
2020–2021	Dynamo Dresden	30	(3)
2021	Union Berlin	0	(0)
2021–2023	Dynamo Dresden	45	(2)
2023–2024	Wehen Wiesbaden	8	(0)
2024–2026	Emmen	28	(4)

International career^{‡}
2015	Germany U16	2	(0)
2017	Germany U18	2	(0)
2017–2018	Germany U19	2	(0)
- * Club domestic league appearances and goals as of 28 April 2026 ‡ National team caps and goals as of 10 August 2021

Julius Kade (born 20 May 1999) is a German professional footballer who plays as a midfielder.

== Career ==
On 6 August 2020, Kade signed for Dynamo Dresden on a three-year deal from Union Berlin. During his first year at Dynamo Dresden, he appeared in 30 matches, scoring 3 goals en-route to winning the 2020–21 3. Liga season as champions, gaining promotion to 2. Bundesliga. In the summer of 2021, Union Berlin exercised a €500,000 contract transfer clause to purchase back Kade from Dresden to the Köpenick based club currently playing in Bundesliga. However, after spending the pre-season in Berlin, Kade returned to Dresden for a sum that was reported to be close to Union's original option.

On 10 August 2023, Kade moved to Wehen Wiesbaden in 2. Bundesliga.

On 27 June 2024, Kade signed a two-year contract with Emmen in the Netherlands.

== Honours ==
Dynamo Dresden

- 3. Liga: 2020–21
