= Max Kulke =

German footballer

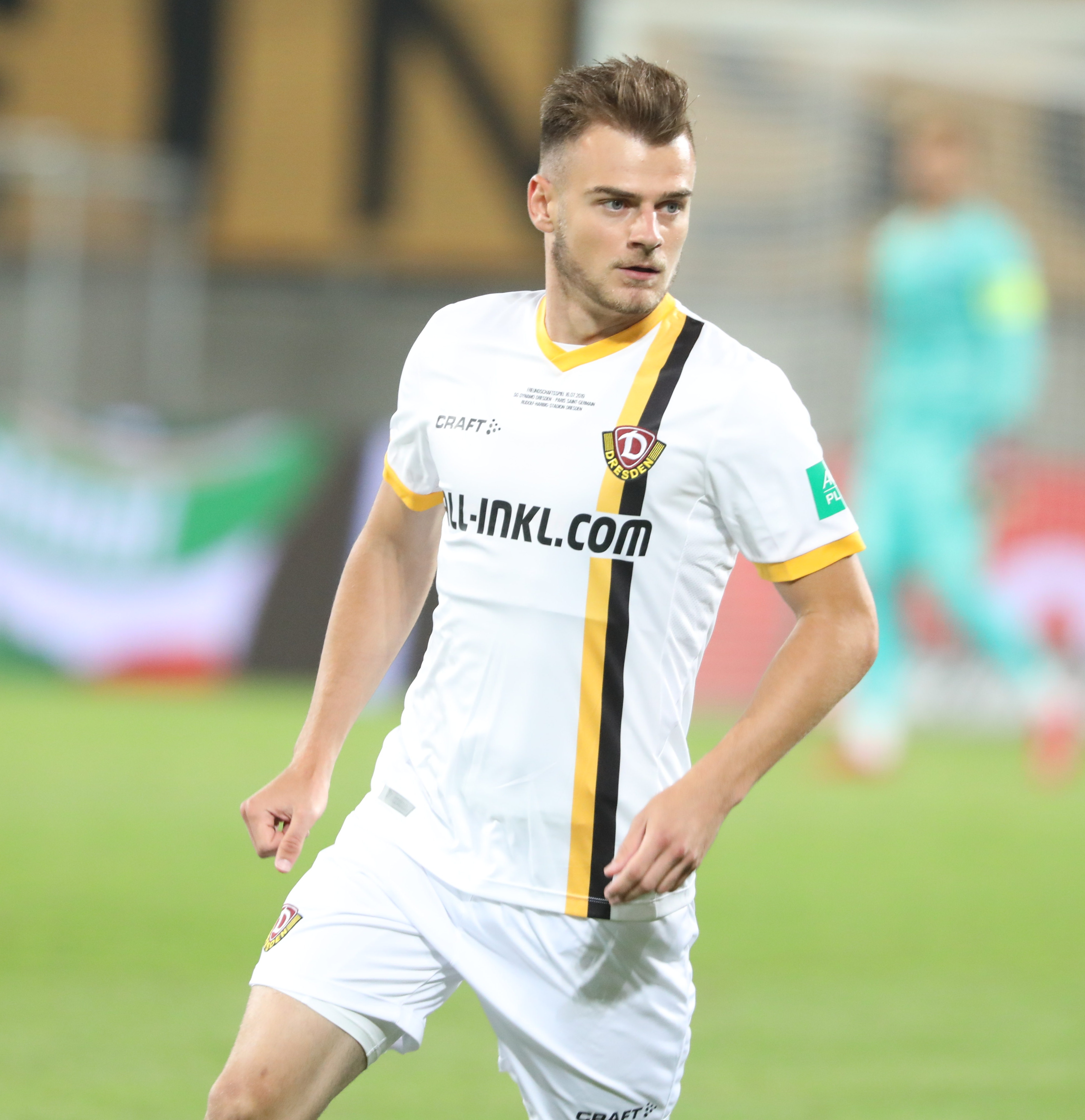
- Kulke in 2019

Personal information
- Date of birth: 10 November 2000 (age 25)
- Place of birth: Wiesa (Kodersdorf), Germany
- Height: 1.77 m (5 ft 10 in)
- Position: Midfielder

Team information
- Current team: Hallescher FC
- Number: 17

Youth career
- –2013: FV Eintracht Niesky
- 2013–2019: Dynamo Dresden

Senior career*
Years	Team	Apps	(Gls)
2019–2023	Dynamo Dresden	31	(0)
2022	→ ZFC Meuselwitz (loan)	17	(0)
2024	VSG Altglienicke	19	(1)
2024–	Hallescher FC	74	(9)
- * Club domestic league appearances and goals as of 23 September 2026

Max Kulke (born 10 November 2000) is a German professional footballer who plays as a midfielder for Hallescher FC.

== Career ==
Kulke made his professional debut for Dynamo Dresden in the 2. Bundesliga on 23 February 2019, starting in the away match against Darmstadt 98 before being substituted out at half-time for Barış Atik, with the match finishing as a 2–0 loss.

On 11 January 2022, Kulke was loaned to ZFC Meuselwitz in Regionalliga Nordost.
