= Robin Becker (footballer) =

German footballer (born 1997)

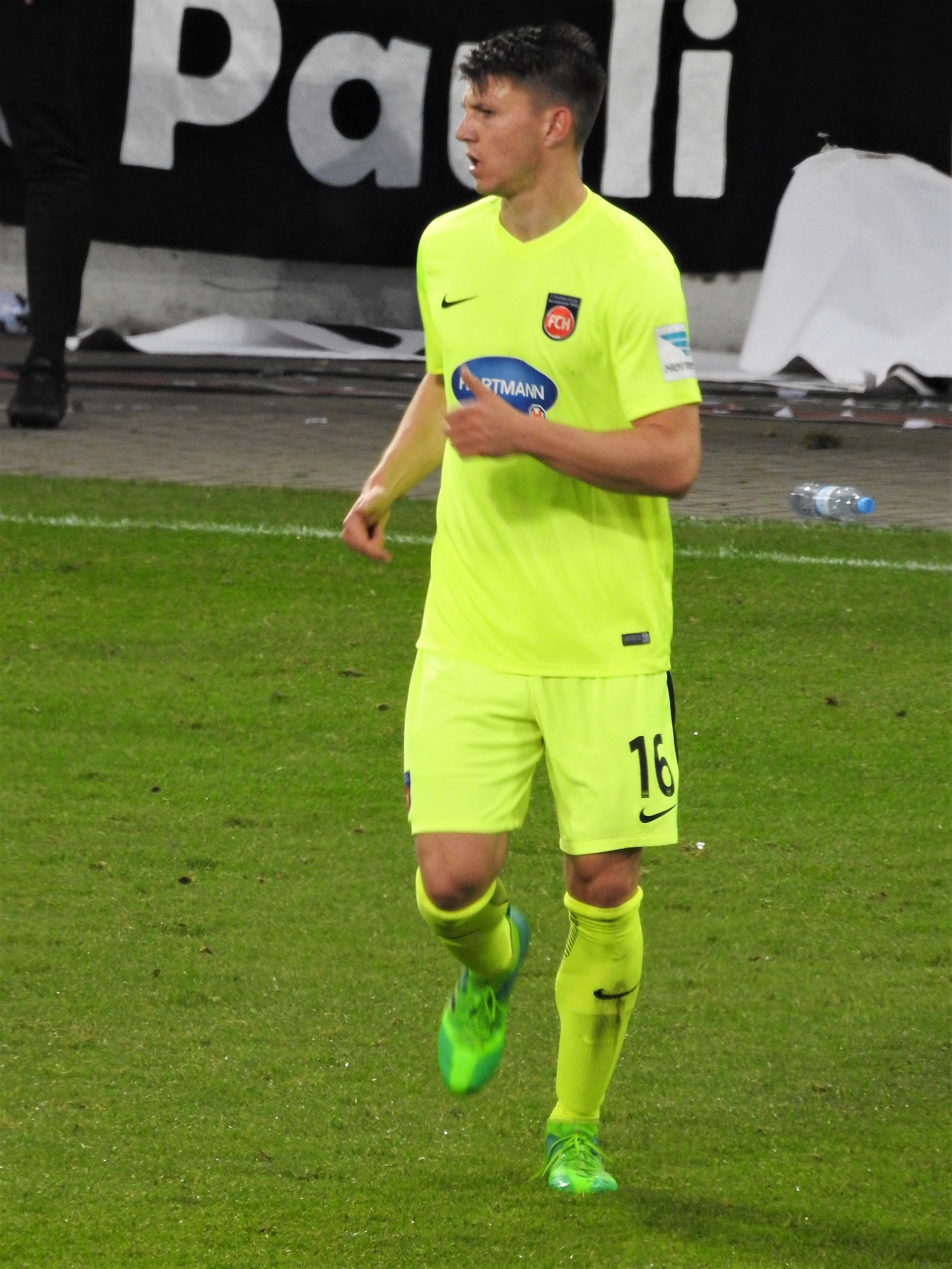
- Becker with 1. FC Heidenheim in 2017

Personal information
- Full name: Robin Tim Becker
- Date of birth: 18 January 1997 (age 29)
- Place of birth: Solingen, Germany
- Height: 1.82 m (6 ft 0 in)
- Position: Right-back

Team information
- Current team: VfR Mannheim
- Number: 16

Youth career
- –2008: VfL Witzhelden
- 2008–2016: Bayer Leverkusen

Senior career*
Years	Team	Apps	(Gls)
2015–2017	Bayer Leverkusen	0	(0)
2016–2017	→ 1. FC Heidenheim (loan)	7	(0)
2017–2020	Eintracht Braunschweig	75	(3)
2018	Eintracht Braunschweig II	1	(0)
2020–2023	Dynamo Dresden	38	(1)
2024	1. FC Saarbrücken	12	(0)
2025–	VfR Mannheim	23	(2)

International career^{‡}
2012–2013	Germany U16	7	(0)
2013–2014	Germany U17	9	(0)
2015	Germany U18	1	(0)
2016–2017	Germany U20	6	(0)
- * Club domestic league appearances and goals as of 24 September 2026 ‡ National team caps and goals as of 15:54, 17 July 2020 (UTC)

Robin Tim Becker (born 18 January 1997) is a German professional footballer who plays as a right-back for VfR Mannheim.

== Career ==
Becker spent the 2016–17 season at 1. FC Heidenheim on loan from Bayer Leverkusen making seven appearances in the 2. Bundesliga.

In June 2017, he joined Eintracht Braunschweig, also of the 2. Bundesliga, signing a three-year contract.

He was released by Eintracht Braunschweig at the end of the 2019–20 season.

He signed for Dynamo Dresden on a two-year contract in July 2020.

On 30 January 2024, Becker joined 1. FC Saarbrücken in 3. Liga.
