= Alexander Schmidt (football manager) =

German footballer and manager

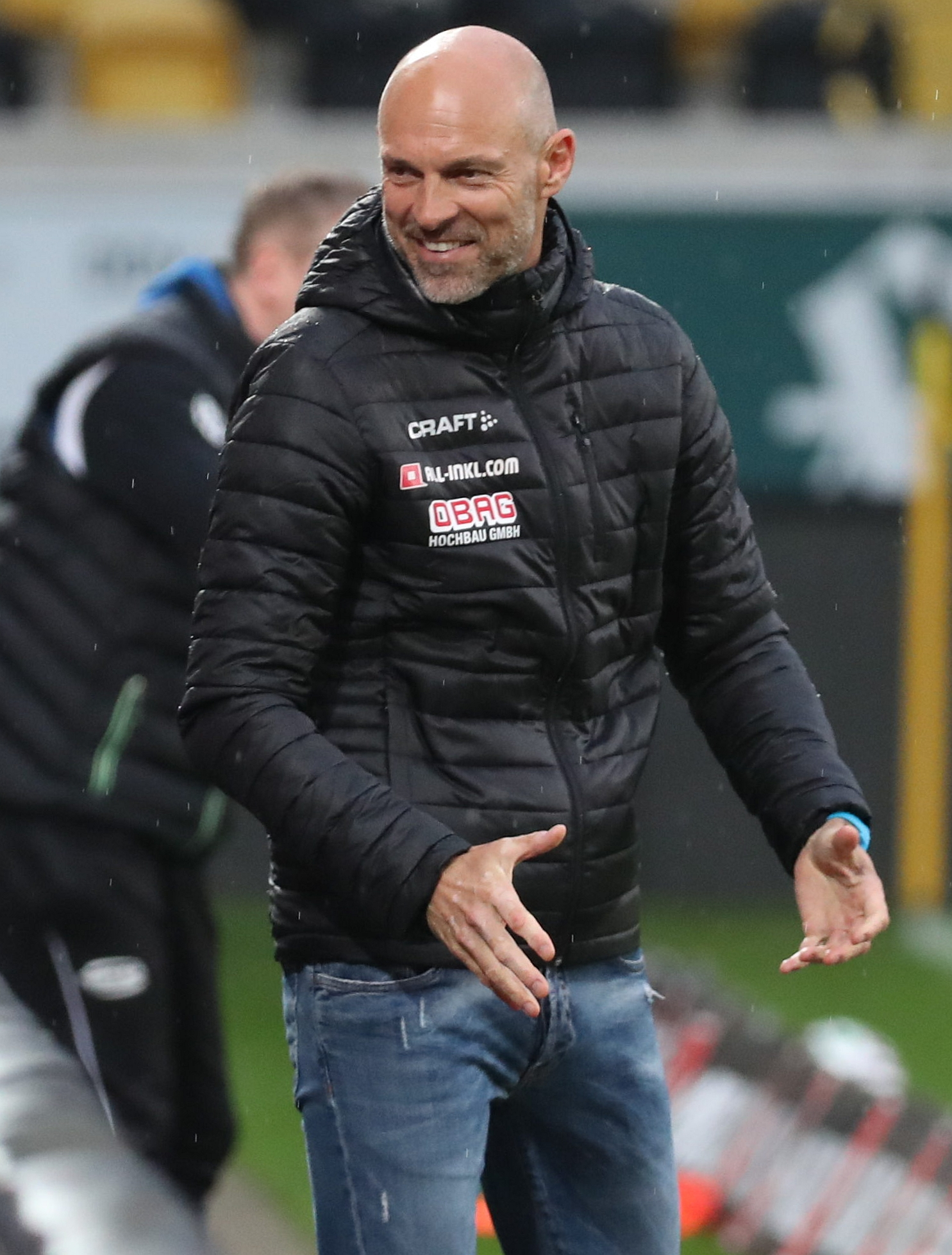

Personal information
- Date of birth: 23 October 1968 (age 58)
- Place of birth: Augsburg, West Germany
- Height: 1.87 m (6 ft 2 in)

Youth career
- FC Augsburg

Senior career*
Years	Team	Apps	(Gls)
- FC Augsburg
- TSG Augsburg
- SV Thierhaupten
- FC Canavese
- TSV Dasing
- TSV Schwaben Augsburg
- TSV Bobingen
- DJK Lechhausen
- FC Pipinsried
- SSV Höchstädt
- TSV Hilgertshausen

Managerial career
- 2002: SSV Höchstädt
- 2012: TSV 1860 Munich II
- 2012–2013: TSV 1860 Munich
- 2014: Jahn Regensburg
- 2019–2020: St. Pölten
- 2020–2021: Türkgücü München
- 2021–2022: Dynamo Dresden
- 2022: Kickers Offenbach
- * Club domestic league appearances and goals

Alexander Schmidt (born 23 October 1968) is a German former footballer and manager, who last managed Kickers Offenbach.

== Coaching career ==
Schmidt started his coaching career as youth coach at FC Augsburg and later 1860 Munich.

In July 2012, Schmidt became head coach of 1860 Munich II and then became head coach of the first team on 18 November 2012, when Reiner Maurer was sacked. Schmidt was sacked on 31 August 2013 and temporarily replaced by Markus von Ahlen as caretaker and later by Friedhelm Funkel as permanent replacement. On 1 July 2014, Schmidt started managing Jahn Regensburg. He was sacked on 10 November 2014. He was sacked by Türkgücü München in February 2021, after starting the job in the summer of 2020.

On 26 April 2021, he took over the head coach position at Dynamo Dresden, originally only on a short contract until the end of the 2020–21 season. However, after his team won six out of seven games without conceding a single goal and secured promotion to the 2. Bundesliga, Schmidt's contract was extended until 2023. Schmidt was sacked on 1 March 2022 after seven games without a win and falling to 14th place.

In July 2022, Schmidt became head coach of Regionalliga Südwest club Kickers Offenbach but was sacked after nine games on 21 September 2022.

== Managerial statistics ==
As of 21 September 2022

Team	From	To	Record					
Team	From	To	G	W	D	L	Win %	Ref.
1860 Munich II	1 July 2012	18 November 2012	21	11	3	7	52.38	
1860 Munich	18 November 2012	31 August 2013	28	10	9	9	35.71	
Jahn Regensburg	30 May 2014	10 November 2014	20	5	3	12	25.00	
St. Pölten	15 June 2019	9 March 2020	26	6	9	11	23.08	
Türkgücü München	1 July 2020	9 February 2021	23	8	9	6	34.78	
Dynamo Dresden	26 April 2021	1 March 2022	34	14	6	14	41.18	
Kickers Offenbach	1 July 2022	21 September 2022	9	3	2	4	33.33	
Total			161	57	41	63	35.40	—
