= Kevin Broll =

German footballer

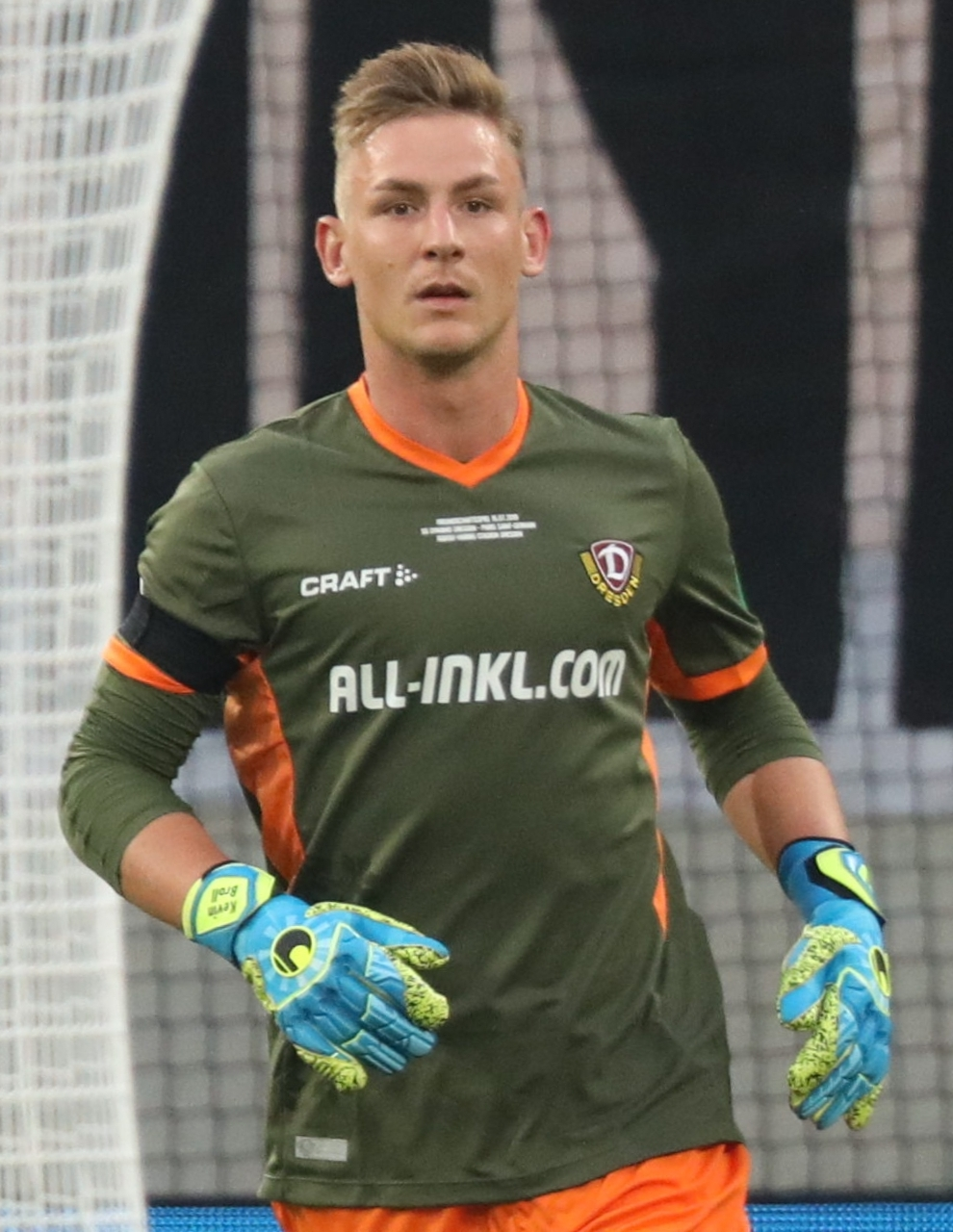
- Broll in 2019

Personal information
- Date of birth: 23 August 1995 (age 31)
- Place of birth: Mannheim, Germany
- Height: 1.86 m (6 ft 1 in)
- Position: Goalkeeper

Team information
- Current team: 1. FC Saarbrücken
- Number: 33

Youth career
- Ludwigshafener SC
- 2001–2013: Waldhof Mannheim

Senior career*
| Years | Team | Apps | (Gls) |
| 2013–2014 | Waldhof Mannheim | 0 | (0) |
| 2014–2015 | FC Homburg | 7 | (0) |
| 2015–2019 | Sonnenhof Großaspach | 120 | (0) |
| 2019–2022 | Dynamo Dresden | 100 | (0) |
| 2022–2023 | Górnik Zabrze | 10 | (0) |
| 2023–2024 | Dynamo Dresden | 17 | (0) |
| 2024–2025 | Omonia 29M | 21 | (0) |
| 2026 | Wehen Wiesbaden | 0 | (0) |
| 2026– | 1. FC Saarbrücken | 0 | (0) |
- * Club domestic league appearances and goals as of 16 May 2026

Kevin Broll (born 23 August 1995) is a German professional footballer who plays as a goalkeeper for 3. Liga club 1. FC Saarbrücken.

== Career ==
Born in Mannheim, Broll started his career at Waldhof Mannheim. In the summer of 2014, Broll signed for FC Homburg on a two-year deal. After a year at Homburg, he signed for 3. Liga club Sonnenhof Großaspach.

On 28 May 2019, he signed for 2. Bundesliga club Dynamo Dresden on a three-year deal.

On 4 July 2022, he joined Polish Ekstraklasa side Górnik Zabrze, signing a one-year contract. Broll started the season as a first-choice goalkeeper for the Silesian club, but lost his spot in the starting line-up after eleven matchdays to Daniel Bielica.

On 31 January 2023, he re-joined Dynamo Dresden on a one-year-and-a-half contract.

On 19 August 2024, Broll signed with PAC Omonia 29M in Cyprus.

== Personal life ==
Broll was born in Germany to Polish parents.
