= Kevin Ehlers =

German footballer

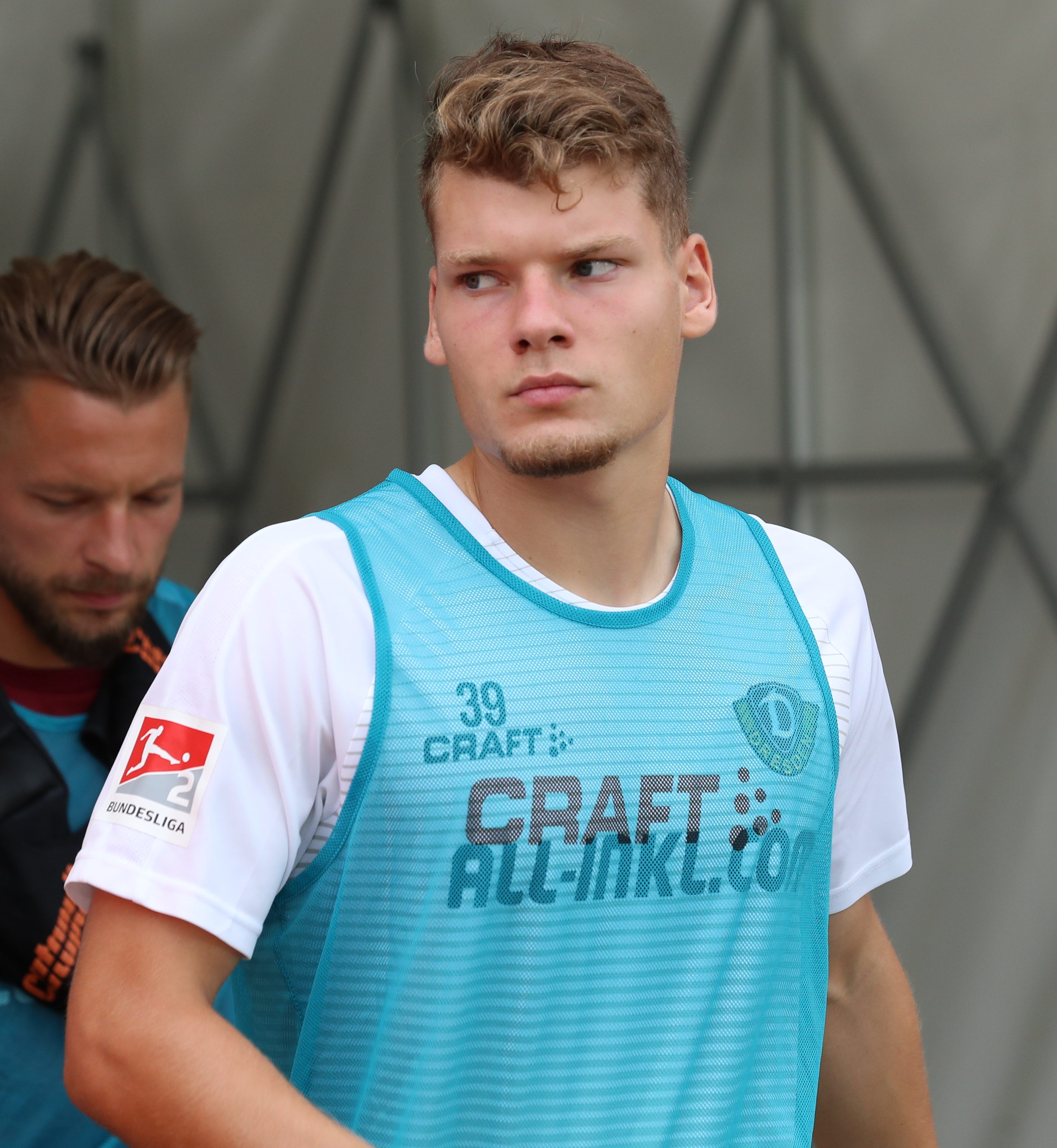
- Ehlers in 2019

Personal information
- Date of birth: 23 January 2001 (age 25)
- Place of birth: Munich, Germany
- Height: 1.87 m (6 ft 2 in)
- Position: Centre-back

Team information
- Current team: Eintracht Braunschweig
- Number: 21

Youth career
- 2006–2007: Erzgebirge Aue
- 2007–2009: Rot-Weiß Sutthausen
- 2009–2017: Hansa Rostock
- 2017–2019: Dynamo Dresden

Senior career*
Years	Team	Apps	(Gls)
2019–2024	Dynamo Dresden	93	(1)
2024–	Eintracht Braunschweig	56	(3)

International career^{‡}
2019	Germany U19	5	(1)
2020	Germany U20	1	(0)
- * Club domestic league appearances and goals as of 18 May 2026 ‡ National team caps and goals as of 24 October 2021

Kevin Ehlers (born 23 January 2001) is a German professional footballer who plays as a centre-back for 2. Bundesliga club Eintracht Braunschweig.

== Career ==
Ehlers made his professional debut for Dynamo Dresden in the 2. Bundesliga on 27 July 2019, starting in the home match against 1. FC Nürnberg which finished as a 1–0 loss.

On 21 May 2024, Ehlers signed a three-year contract with Eintracht Braunschweig in 2. Bundesliga.

== Personal life ==
Ehlers was born in Munich, Bavaria, and is the son of former Bundesliga footballer Uwe Ehlers.

== Honours ==
Individual

- Fritz Walter Medal U19 Silver: 2020
