= Christoph Daferner =

German footballer

Personal information
- Date of birth: 12 January 1998 (age 28)
- Place of birth: Pöttmes, Germany
- Height: 1.89 m (6 ft 2 in)
- Position: Forward

Team information
- Current team: Dynamo Dresden
- Number: 33

Youth career
- TSV Pöttmes
- –2012: JFG Neuburg
- 2012–2014: FC Augsburg
- 2014–2016: 1860 Munich

Senior career*
Years	Team	Apps	(Gls)
2016–2017	1860 Munich II	8	(3)
2017–2020	SC Freiburg II	60	(25)
2019–2020	SC Freiburg	1	(0)
2019–2020	→ Erzgebirge Aue (loan)	22	(1)
2020–2022	Dynamo Dresden	69	(25)
2022–2025	1.FC Nürnberg	33	(3)
2024	→ Fortuna Düsseldorf (loan)	14	(0)
2024–2025	→ Dynamo Dresden (loan)	37	(18)
2025–	Dynamo Dresden	30	(7)

International career
2015–2016	Germany U18	8	(3)
2017–2018	Germany U20	3	(1)
- * Club domestic league appearances and goals as of 18 May 2026

Christoph Daferner (born 12 January 1998) is a German professional footballer who plays as a forward for 2. Bundesliga club Dynamo Dresden.

Daferner has spent his career between various different clubs, making appearances in all three German nationwide leagues, with the majority of his professional appearances within the 3. Bundesliga.

== Career ==
Daferner made his professional debut for SC Freiburg in the Bundesliga on 21 April 2019, coming on as a substitute in the 65th minute for Florian Niederlechner in the home match against Borussia Dortmund. On 7 August 2020, Dynamo Dresden announced that Daferner has signed a three-year contract with the club.

On 28 June 2022, Daferner signed with 1. FC Nürnberg. On 2 January 2024, Daferner moved on loan to Fortuna Düsseldorf, with an option to buy. On 28 June 2024, he returned to Dynamo Dresden on loan, and was signed by the club on 17 May 2025.
