= 2017–18 SSV Jahn Regensburg season =

SSV Jahn Regensburg
2017–18 season
- Chairman: Hans Rothammer
- Coach: Achim Beierlorzer
- Stadium: Continental Arena
- 2. Bundesliga: 5th
- DFB-Pokal: Second round
- Top goalscorer: League: Marco Grüttner (12); All: Marco Grüttner (14)
- Highest home attendance: 15,224 (sell-out) vs 1. FC Nürnberg, FC St. Pauli and SV Darmstadt
- Lowest home attendance: 7,137 vs Arminia Bielefeld
- Average home league attendance: 11081
- Biggest win: 4–0 vs. MSV Duisburg
- Biggest defeat: 0–3 vs. SV Darmstadt
Home colours	Away colours	Third colours
- All statistics correct as of 18:17, 15 May 2018 (UTC).

The 2017–18 SSV Jahn Regensburg season is the 111th season in the club's football history. In 2017–18, the club plays in the 2. Bundesliga, the second tier of German football. It was the club's first season back in this league, having won promotion from the 3. Liga in 2016–17 after a play-off victory over TSV 1860 Munich.

The club also took part in the 2017–18 edition of the DFB-Pokal, the German Cup, but was eliminated in the second round.

== Events ==
SSV Jahn Regensburg won promotion after beating TSV 1860 Munich in the 2016–17 2. Bundesliga relegation play-offs. The contract of the manager Heiko Herrlich was only valid for the 3. Liga and despite a verbal agreement to continue as manager, Herrlich decided to join Bundesliga club Bayer 04 Leverkusen instead. On 26 June 2017, Achim Beierlorzer took over as new manager.

In June 2017, the Global Sports Invest AG with CEO Philipp Schober bought 90% of the shares of the SSV Jahn Regensburg GmbH & Co KGaA (the owner of the professional football team) from Bauteam Tretzel, a construction company which is involved in the corruption affair in Regensburg. The management of the club claimed not to be involved in the corruption affair concerning campaign donations for mayor Joachim Wolbergs.

Regensburg did not start well in the season. They lost the first league match to a player's blunder in injury time and also lost the second match. In the first round of the DFB-Pokal, they reached the next round with a victory over fellow league side SV Darmstadt 98. The week after, Regensburg won the first three points in the league in an away match against FC Ingolstadt 04. With only six points from the next eight league matches, Regensburg dropped to the 15th place, the lowest place in the table without relegation. They ware also eliminated in the second round of the DFB-Pokal by fellow league side 1. FC Heidenheim. But the next league matches against the lower placed teams 1. FC Kaiserslautern and SpVgg Greuther Fürth could be won and the Jahn collected ten points until the winter break which earned them a secured spot in the middle of the table.

In September 2017, Bauteam Tretzel withdrew from their contract with the Global Sports Invest and transferred 62% of the shares of the SSV Jahn Regensburg GmbH & Co KGaA to SSV Jahn Regensburg (the club). Finally, the club could acquire all the shares in October 2017.

After the winter break, Regensburg was in a good form and could eventually climb to the fourth place in the table, only two points behind the third place which would qualify them to the promotion play-offs. Nevertheless, they were only nine points ahead of the 16th place which would send them to the relegation play-offs, so they could still not be sure that they avoided relegation. With the 3–1 victory over FC St. Pauli on the 31st matchday, they finally managed to avoid relegation and still had a chance at the promotion play-offs. But they only won one point from the last three matches and finished the league in fifth place. This was the first time that Jahn Regensburg could avoid relegation from the 2. Bundesliga and a great success for the team.

== Transfers ==
=== In ===
No.	Pos.	Name	Age	EU	Moving from	Type	Transfer Window	Contract ends	Transfer fee	Ref.
23	FW	(Armenia) Sargis Adamyan	24	No	TSV Steinbach		Summer	30 June 2019		
22	FW	Sebastian Stolze	22	Yes	VfL Wolfsburg	Loan	Summer	30 June 2018	N/A	
21	FW	Jonas Nietfeld	23	Yes	FSV Zwickau		Summer	30 June 2019		
20	FW	(Kosovo) Albion Vrenezi	23	No	FC Augsburg II		Summer	30 June 2019		
5	DF	Benedikt Gimber	20	Yes	TSG 1899 Hoffenheim	Loan	Summer	30 June 2018	N/A	
4	DF	(Denmark) Asger Sørensen	20	Yes	FC Red Bull Salzburg	Loan	Summer	30 June 2018	N/A	
29	FW	Joshua Mees	21	Yes	TSG 1899 Hoffenheim	Loan	Summer	30 June 2018	N/A	
33	GK	André Weis	27	Yes	1. FC Kaiserslautern	Loan	Summer	30 June 2018	N/A	
11	FW	Sebastian Freis	32	Yes	Free agent		Summer	30 June 2019	N/A	
25	FW	Hamadi Al Ghaddioui	27	Yes	Sportfreunde Lotte		Winter	30 June 2020		

=== Out ===
No.	Pos.	Name	Age	EU	Moving to	Type	Transfer Window	Transfer fee	Ref.
25	MF	Erik Thommy	22	Yes	FC Augsburg	Loan ended	Summer	N/A	
4	DF	Thomas Paulus	35	Yes		Retirement	Summer	N/A	
32	MF	Michael Faber	22	Yes	DJK Vilzing	Free transfer	Summer	None	
20	MF	Kolja Pusch	24	Yes	1. FC Heidenheim	Free transfer	Summer	None	
33	DF	Robin Urban	23	Yes	Rot-Weiss Essen	Free transfer	Summer	None	
21	MF	(Austria) Daniel Schöpf	27	Yes		Free transfer	Summer	None	
24	MF	André Luge	26	Yes	FC Augsburg	Free transfer	Summer	None	
5	DF	(Turkey) Ali Odabas	23	No	FSV Zwickau	Loan	Summer	N/A	
34	FW	Haris Hyseni	24	Yes	SV Meppen	Loan	Summer	N/A	
11	FW	Markus Ziereis	24	Yes	TSV 1860 Munich		Summer	N/A	
19	FW	Patrik Džalto	20	Yes	TuS Koblenz		Winter	N/A	

== Preseason and friendlies ==
Win Draw Loss Postponed

Date	Kickoff^{A}	Venue	City	Opponent	Res.^{B}	Att.	Goalscorers		Ref.
Date	Kickoff^{A}	Venue	City	Opponent	Res.^{B}	Att.	SSV Jahn Regensburg	Opponent	Ref.
30 June 2017	18:00	Sportplatz SV Töging	Töging	FC Augsburg II	2–0	1,000	Adamyan 29'; Grüttner 70'		
2 July 2017	17:00		Gülchsheim	1. FC Schweinfurt	1–4		Nietfeld 83'	Jabiri 16', 17'; Krautschneider 44'; Kracun 76'	
7 July 2017	17:00	Kaulbachweg	Regensburg	SV Ried	1–4	512	Hoffmann 18'	Mayer 87'	
9 July 2017	11:30		Bad Gögging	SpVgg Niederaichbach	21–1	700	Adamyan 8', 12', 35'; Grüttner 18', 22', 31', 42'; Nietfeld 39'; Stolze 46', 75'; Vrenezi 47', 54'; Ziereis 48', 55', 65', 79', 90'; Džalto 53', 71'; Nachreiner 59'; Geipl 86'	Wischinski 7'	
15 July 2017	14:00	Stadion an der Further Straße	Cham	VfR Aalen	2–3		Grüttner 4'; Hoffmann 67'	Bär 16'; Schorr 36'; Morys 76'	
21 July 2017	17:00		Ergolding	Arsenal F.C. Reserves	5–0		Ziereis 15'; Vrenezi 29'; Mees 51'; Hoffmann 54'; Hesse 61'		
22 July 2017	15:00	Donaustadion	Ulm	FC Augsburg	2–1		Adamyan 15'; Grüttner 40'	Ji 34'	
29 August 2017	18:00		Kornburg	TSV Kornburg	7–1		Vrenezi 6', 8', 31'; Nietfeld 54'; Freis 65'; George 68'; Saller 82'	Pasko 58'	
30 August 2017	19:00	Stadion am Roten Steg	Bad Kötzting	1. FC Bad Kötzting	6–0	800	Grüttner 11'; Vrenezi 12'; Mees 25'; Nietfeld 57'; Freis 71'; Geipl 79'		
4 October 2017	16:30	Sportgelände	Tirschenreuth	FSV Zwickau	2–1	250	Freis 23', 29'	Öztürk 89'	
9 November 2017	14:30	Kaulbachweg	Regensburg	SpVgg Unterhaching	2–0	250	Stolze 75'; Hoffmann 79'		
6 January 2018	14:00	Ernst-Abbe-Sportfeld, Platz 8	Jena	FC Carl Zeiss Jena	3–2	about 300	Pannewitz 2' (o.g.); Hoffmann 58'; Adamyan 87'	Thiele 32'; Starke 34'	
9 January 2018	14:00	Kaulbachweg	Regensburg	LASK Linz	3–3	about 250	Al Ghaddioui 32', 38'; Stolze 63' (pen.)	Raguž 78', 98'; Gartler 81'	
13 January 2018	14:00	Mechatronik Arena	Großaspach	SG Sonnenhof Großaspach	2–0	Mees 6'; Grüttner 39'			
19 January 2018	14:00	Rechte Saalachzeile 58	Salzburg	FC Liefering	5–1		Vrenezi 3'; Nietfeld 53'; Al Ghaddioui 60'; Freis 65'; Stolze 68'	Niangbo 20'	

== 2. Bundesliga ==
=== 2. Bundesliga fixtures & results ===
Win Draw Loss Postponed

MD	Date Kickoff^{A}	H/A	Opponent	Res.^{B} F–A	Att.	Goalscorers		Table		Ref.
MD	Date Kickoff^{A}	H/A	Opponent	Res.^{B} F–A	Att.	SSV Jahn Regensburg	Opponent	Pos.	Pts.	Ref.
1	29 July 2017 15:30	A	Arminia Bielefeld	1–2	17,333	George 23'	Staude 39'; Šporar 90'	12	0	
2	6 August 2017 13:30	H	1. FC Nürnberg	0–1	15,224 (sell-out)		Möhwald 78'	15	0	
3	20 August 2017 13:30	A	FC Ingolstadt	4–2	13,000	Mees 28'; George 73', 79'; Nietfeld 90+3'	Kittel 52'; M. Matip 57'	12	3	
4	26 August 2017 13:00	H	Holstein Kiel	1–2	8,600	Knoll 43'	Schindler 20'; Ducksch 30'	14	3	
5	8 September 2017 18:30	A	1. FC Heidenheim	3–1	10,500	Knoll 68'; Mees 88'; Grüttner 90+4'	Widemann 86'	13	6	
6	17 September 2017 13:30	H	Dynamo Dresden	0–2	14,831		Horvath 48'; Aosman 51'	15	6	
7	20 September 2017 18:30	A	Fortuna Düsseldorf	0–1	19,380		Kujović 48'	16	6	
8	23 September 2017 13:00	H	Eintracht Braunschweig	2–1	8,432	Grüttner 47'; Nietfeld 77'	Baffo 42'	12	9	
9	1 October 2017 13:30	A	SV Sandhausen	0–2	5,502		Höler 67', 84'	14	9	
10	15 October 2017 13:30	H	Union Berlin	0–2	9,791		Polter 20'; Gogia 57'	14	9	
11	22 October 2017 13:30	A	Erzgebirge Aue	0–1	7,550		Kvesić 59'	15	9	
12	28 October 2017 13:00	H	1. FC Kaiserslautern	3–1	10,081	Stolze 10', 49'; Knoll 33'	Moritz 14'	15	12	
13	4 November 2017 13:00	H	SpVgg Greuther Fürth	3–2	11,100	Adamyan 20', 44'; Magyar 68' (o.g.)	Magyar 32'; Caligiuri 47'	13	15	
14	19 November 2017 13:30	A	FC St. Pauli	2–2	29,546	Grüttner 21'; Adamyan 24'	Sobiech 40'; Allagui 45'	13	16	
15	25 November 2017 13:00	H	MSV Duisburg	4–0	9,889	Grüttner 8'; Nietfeld 27'; Lais 39'; Mees 87'		9	19	
16	3 December 2017 13:30	A	SV Darmstadt 98	1–0	14,650	Grüttner 52'		7	22	
17	9 December 2017 13:00	H	VfL Bochum	0–1	7,285		Kruse 7'	12	22	
18	16 December 2017 13:00	H	Arminia Bielefeld	3–2	7,137	Gimber 14'; Grüttner 25'; Hartherz 78' (o.g.)	Voglsammer 12'; Kerschbaumer 90+2'	8	25	
19	23 January 2018 20:30	A	1. FC Nürnberg	2–2	26,231	Lais 6'; Grüttner 28'	Behrens 10'; Salli 49'	9	26	
20	26 January 2018 18:30	H	FC Ingolstadt	3–2	13,010	Wahl 72'; Stolze 78'; Nietfeld 88'	Morales 72'; Lezcano 72'	7	29	
21	3 February 2018 13:00	A	Holstein Kiel	1–1	10,000	Grüttner 28'	Ducksch 4'	7	30	
22	10 February 2018 13:00	H	1. FC Heidenheim	2–0	8,006	George 34'; Grüttner 90'		6	33	
23	18 February 2018 13:30	A	Dynamo Dresden	0–1	25,003		Berko 35'	8	33	
24	23 February 2018 18:30	H	Fortuna Düsseldorf	4–3	10,963	Grüttner 37'; Nietfeld 40'; Knoll 60' (pen.); Adamyan 65'	Hennings 3'; Raman 13'; Usami 15'	5	36	
25	4 March 2018 13:30	A	Eintracht Braunschweig	1–2	18,560	Knoll 85' (pen.)	Nyman 36'; Hochscheidt 61'	6	36	
26	11 March 2018 13:30	H	SV Sandhausen	2–1	11,885	Mees 28', 52'	Aygüneş 60'	4	39	
27	17 March 2018 13:00	A	Union Berlin	2–2	21,248	Grüttner 59'; Knoll 89' (pen.)	F. Kroos 45'; Hosiner 64'	4	40	
28	1 April 2018 13:30	H	Erzgebirge Aue	1–3	11,707	Knoll 50'	Köpke 27', 57'; Munsy 43'	5	40	
29	8 April 2018 13:00	A	1. FC Kaiserslautern	1–1	27,780	Saller 6'	Andersson 73'	5	41	
30	13 April 2018 18:30	A	SpVgg Greuther Fürth	2–1	11,105	George 49', 84'	Nandzik 87' (o.g.)	4	44	
31	21 April 2018 13:00	H	FC St. Pauli	3–1	15,224 (sell-out)	Grüttner 10'; Adamyan 21'; Mees 48'	Flum 53'	4	47	
32	29 April 2018 13:30	A	MSV Duisburg	1–4	15,149	George 58'	Nauber 52'; Iljutcenko 60'; Stoppelkamp 75'; Engin 87'	5	47	
33	6 May 2018 15:30	H	SV Darmstadt 98	0–3	15,210 (sell-out)		Jones 29'; Ji 68'; Kempe 73'	5	47	
34	13 May 15:30	A	VfL Bochum	1–1	20,811	Grüttner 64'	Wurtz 87'	5	48	

=== League table ===
Pos	Team	Pld	W	D	L	GF	GA	GD	Pts	Promotion, qualification or relegation
3	Holstein Kiel	34	14	14	6	71	44	+27	56	Qualification for promotion play-offs
4	Arminia Bielefeld	34	12	12	10	51	47	+4	48	
5	Jahn Regensburg	34	14	6	14	53	53	0	48	
6	VfL Bochum	34	13	9	12	37	40	−3	48	
7	MSV Duisburg	34	13	9	12	52	56	−4	48	

Source: DFB
Rules for classification: 1) Points; 2) Goal difference; 3) Goals scored

== DFB-Pokal ==
Win Draw Loss Postponed

RD	Date	Kickoff^{A}	Venue	City	Opponent	Result^{B}	Attendance	Goalscorers		Ref.
RD	Date	Kickoff^{A}	Venue	City	Opponent	Result^{B}	Attendance	SSV Jahn Regensburg	Opponent	Ref.
First round	12 August 2017	18:30	Continental Arena	Regensburg	SV Darmstadt 98	3–1	8,919	Lais 45+2' (pen.); Nietfeld 87'; Grüttner 90+4'	Sobiech 40'	
Second round	25 October 2017	20:45	Continental Arena	Regensburg	1. FC Heidenheim	2–5	6,678	Nietfeld 45+1'; Grüttner 54'	Thiel 30', 50'; Glatzel 32', 82'; Pusch 55'	

== Player information ==
As of 21 April 2018.

No.	Pos	Nat	Player	Total		2. Liga		DFB-Pokal	
No.	Pos	Nat	Player	Apps	Goals	Apps	Goals	Apps	Goals
1	GK	(Germany) GER	Philipp Pentke	30	0	28	0	2	0
3	DF	(Germany) GER	Alexander Nandzik	33	0	31	0	2	0
4	DF	(Denmark) DEN	Asger Sørensen	26	0	25	0	1	0
5	DF	(Germany) GER	Benedikt Gimber	29	2	27	1	2	1
6	DF	(Germany) GER	Benedikt Saller	30	1	29	1	1	0
7	DF	(Germany) GER	Marcel Hofrath	8	0	8	0	0	0
8	MF	(Germany) GER	Andreas Geipl	24	0	22	0	2	0
9	FW	(Germany) GER	Jann George	30	7	29	7	1	0
10	MF	(Germany) GER	Marvin Knoll	34	7	32	7	2	0
11	FW	(Germany) GER	Sebastian Freis	6	0	5	0	1	0
13	DF	(Germany) GER	Sven Kopp	0	0	0	0	0	0
15	FW	(Germany) GER	Marco Grüttner	35	15	33	13	2	2
16	DF	(Lithuania) LTU	Markus Palionis	8	0	8	0	0	0
17	MF	(Germany) GER	Oliver Hein	1	0	1	0	0	0
18	MF	(Germany) GER	Marc Lais	34	3	32	2	2	1
19	FW	(Germany) GER	Patrik Džalto	0	0	0	0	0	0
20	FW	(Kosovo) KOS	Albion Vrenezi	15	0	15	0	0	0
21	FW	(Germany) GER	Jonas Nietfeld	32	7	30	5	2	2
22	FW	(Germany) GER	Sebastian Stolze	27	3	27	3	0	0
23	FW	(Armenia) ARM	Sargis Adamyan	35	5	33	5	2	0
25	FW	(Germany) GER	Hamadi Al Ghaddioui	5	0	5	0	0	0
26	GK	(Germany) GER	Bastian Lerch	0	0	0	0	0	0
27	MF	(Germany) GER	Kevin Hoffmann	2	0	0	0	2	0
28	DF	(Germany) GER	Sebastian Nachreiner	29	0	27	0	2	0
29	FW	(Germany) GER	Joshua Mees	24	6	22	6	2	0
31	MF	(Germany) GER	Uwe Hesse	1	0	1	0	0	0
33	GK	(Germany) GER	André Weis	6	0	6	0	0	0

== Notes ==
A. Kickoff time in Central European Time/Central European Summer Time.
B. SSV Jahn Regensburg goals first.
