= 2016–17 SSV Jahn Regensburg season =

SSV Jahn Regensburg
2016–17 season
- Chairman: Hans Rothammer
- Coach: Heiko Herrlich
- Stadium: Continental Arena
- 3. Liga: 3rd (promoted)
- DFB-Pokal: First round
- Bavarian Cup: Second round
- Top goalscorer: League: Marco Grüttner (13); All: Marco Grüttner (13)
- Highest home attendance: 15,224 (sell-out) vs 1860 Munich
- Lowest home attendance: 3,783 vs Sonnenhof Großaspach
- Biggest win: 3–0 vs SC Paderborn and Chemnitzer FC
- Biggest defeat: 0–4 vs FSV Zwickau
Home colours	Away colours	Third colours
- All statistics correct as of 17:15, 20 May 2017 (UTC).

The 2016–17 SSV Jahn Regensburg season was the club's seventh season in the 3. Liga.

== Events ==
SSV Jahn Regensburg won promotion after beating VfL Wolfsburg II in the 2015–16 Regionalliga promotion play-offs.

In the preseason match against FC Sopron on 16 July Ali Odabas sustained an anterior cruciate ligament injury which means he will not be able to play in the next eight or nine months.

== Transfers ==
=== In ===
No.	Pos.	Name	Age	EU	Moving from	Type	Transfer Window	Contract ends	Transfer fee	Ref.
6	DF	Benedikt Saller	23	Yes	1. FSV Mainz 05 II		Summer	2018		
15	FW	Marco Grüttner	30	Yes	VfB Stuttgart II		Summer	2018		
19	FW	Patrik Džalto	19	Yes	Bayer 04 Leverkusen	Loan	Summer	2017		
25	MF	Erik Thommy	21	Yes	FC Augsburg	Loan	Summer	2017		
26	GK	Bastian Lerch	23	Yes	SpVgg Greuther Fürth		Summer	2017		

=== Out ===
No.	Pos.	Name	Age	EU	Moving to	Type	Transfer Window	Transfer fee	Ref.
2	DF	Martin Tiefenbrunner	20	Yes	SV Schalding-Heining	Released	Summer		
6	MF	Thomas Kurz	28	Yes	FC Ingolstadt 04 II	Released	Summer		
14	DF	Fabian Trettenbach	24	Yes	DJK Vilzing	Released	Summer		
19	MF	Fabian Raithel	20	Yes		Released	Summer		
22	GK	David Pokorny	27	Yes		Released	Summer		
	DF	Jonas Sonnenberg	23	Yes		Released	Summer		

== Preseason and friendlies ==
Win Draw Loss Postponed

Date	Kickoff^{A}	Venue	City	Opponent	Res.^{B}	Att.	Goalscorers		Ref.
Date	Kickoff^{A}	Venue	City	Opponent	Res.^{B}	Att.	SSV Jahn Regensburg	Opponent	Ref.
18 June 2016	18:00	Pettendorfer Sportplatz	Pettendorf	FC Pielenhofen-Adlersberg	12–0		Hyseni 9'; Ziereis 34'; Geipl 48', 81'; Pusch 51'; 52' (o.g.); Hein 58'; Grüttner 65', 68', 76', 84'; Faber 74'		
23 June 2016	18:30		Vohenstrauß	SpVgg Vohenstrauß	10–0	450	Geipl 35'; Hesse 42'; Hein 4'; Luge 50', 55', 60', 68', 72'; Urban 74'; Odabas 77'		
25 June 2016	11:00	Sportplatz an der Schillerwiese	Regensburg	Freier TuS Regensburg	11–0	300	Nandzik 30'; Urban 37'; Nachreiner 39'; Ziereis 56', 64', 82'; 66' (o.g.); 68' (o.g.); Grüttner 74', 86'; George 87'		
1 July 2016	18:00		Tirschenreuth	FC Carl Zeiss Jena	1–0	550	Schöpf 60'		
4 July 2016	18:30		Abensberg	TSV Buchbach	1–4		Hyseni 16'	Denk 34'; Breu 43'; Dotzler 45'; Bauer 88'	
8 July 2016	19:00		Rielasingen	FC Zürich	2–1		Thommy 55'; Lais 62'	Winter 49'	
9 July 2016	16:00		Rielasingen	1. FC Rielasingen-Arlen	6–1		Schöpf 18'; Grüttner 20'; Hyseni 30'; Hoffmann 53'; 58' (o.g.); Faber 78'	73'	
16 July 2016	17:00		Altheim	FC Sopron	2–0		Grüttner 3'; Nandzik 40'		
19 July 2016	17:00	MAR Arena	Seligenporten	SV Seligenporten	1–0		Grüttner 85'		
23 July 2016	16:00	Continental Arena	Regensburg	VfL Bochum	2–2	7,155	Thommy 11'; Grüttner 47'	Eisfeld 12'; Mlapa 19'	
2 September 2016	16:00		Glött	1. FC Heidenheim	1–2	600	Grüttner 42'	Finne 82', 90'	
7 October 2016	14:00	Max-Morlock-Platz	Nuremberg	1. FC Nürnberg	2–1	400	George 10'; Lais 29'	Burgstaller 83'	
11 November 2016	14:00	Am Mainpark	Eibelstadt	Würzburger Kickers	3–1		Luge 33', 41'; Hofrath 80'	Soriano 80'	
11 January 2017	15:00	Kaulbachweg	Regensburg	1. FC Nürnberg II	8–2	100	Grüttner 15', 35', 45'; Saller 42'; Ziereis 51', 53'; Luge 71'; Thommy 90'	Löwen 10'; Leyla 42'	
16 January 2017	15:00	Kaulbachweg	Regensburg	SK Dynamo České Budějovice	4–2		Hyseni 34'; Ziereis 37'; Schöpf 67'; Luge 69'	Matejka 10'; Čermák 54'	
18 January 2017	14:00	Rechte Saalachzeile 58	Salzburg	FC Liefering	1–1		Lais 19'	Okugawa 30'	
21 January 2017	14:00	Kaulbachweg	Regensburg	SV Waldhof Mannheim	2–3		Luge 73'; Kopp 89'	Hebisch 44'; Sommer 46', 47'	
23 January 2017	14:30	Grünfleckstraße 1	Ismaning	Wacker Innsbruck	3–2		Ziereis 5'; Hoffmann 51'; Schöpf 62'	Riemann 75'; Eler 89'	

== 3. Liga ==
=== 3. Liga fixtures & results ===
Win Draw Loss Postponed

MD	Date Kickoff^{A}	H/A	Opponent	Res.^{B} F–A	Att.	Goalscorers		Table		Ref.
MD	Date Kickoff^{A}	H/A	Opponent	Res.^{B} F–A	Att.	SSV Jahn Regensburg	Opponent	Pos.	Pts.	Ref.
1	30 July 2016 14:00	H	Hansa Rostock	2–0	7,683	Geipl 52'; Pusch 64'		4	3	
2	7 August 2016 14:00	A	Sonnenhof Großaspach	4–3	2,200	Grüttner 25'; Lais 52'; George 76'; Thommy 78'	Landeka 27'; Jüllich 39'; Röttger 64'	2	6	
3	10 August 2016 19:00	H	Hallescher FC	2–0	6,823	Brügmann 34' (o.g.); George 52'		1	9	
4	13 August 2016 14:00	A	FSV Frankfurt	1–1	3,281	Geipl 48'	Stark 46'	1	10	
5	27 August 2016 14:00	H	VfR Aalen	0–2	4,537		Morys 21'; Vasiliadis 84'	3	10	
6	10 September 2016 14:00	A	Sportfreunde Lotte	2–3	1,488	Rahn 41' (o.g.); George 45'	Freiberger 44'; Pires-Rodrigues 55'; Lindner 90+3'	9	19	
7	17 September 2016 14:00	H	Fortuna Köln	2–2	4,123	Lais; Hyseni 90+4'	Dahmani 32'; Brašnić 59' (pen.)	7	11	
8	20 September 2016 18:30	A	FSV Zwickau	0–4	4,350		Bär 39', 49', 54'; Nietfeld 82'	10	11	
9	24 September 2016 14:00	H	SC Paderborn	3–0	4,582	Grüttner 23'; George 34', 45+1'		7	14	
10	1 October 2016 14:00	A	VfL Osnabrück	2–1	7,252	Lais 26'; George 75'	Reimerink 62'	4	17	
11	15 October 2016 14:00	H	MSV Duisburg	1–2	7,786	George 53'	Albutat 9'; Iljutcenko 80'	8	17	
12	23 October 2016 14:00	A	Mainz 05 II	0–2	784		Trümner 33'; Parker 53' (pen.)	11	17	
13	29 October 2016 14:00	H	1. FC Magdeburg	1–1	6,386	Pusch 50'	Löhmannsröben 71'	12	18	
14	5 November 2016 14:00	A	Werder Bremen II	1–3	541	Geipl 85' (pen.)	Yatabaré 68', 90+2'; Bytyqi 88'	15	18	
15	19 November 2016 14:00	H	Wehen Wiesbaden	3–1	4,715	Thommy 28', 74'; Grüttner 90'	Kováč 8'	12	21	
16	26 November 2016 14:00	A	Holstein Kiel	1–2	4,256	Hein 88'	Lewerenz 77'; Siedschlag 83'	12	21	
17	2 December 2016 19:00	H	Rot-Weiß Erfurt	0–1	4,209		Kammlott 62'	15	21	
18	10 December 2016 14:00	A	Chemnitzer FC	3–0	9,087	Grüttner 24', 65', 74'		12	24	
19	17 December 2016 14:00	H	Preußen Münster	3–1	4,012	George 27'; Grüttner 76', 82'	Rizzi 49' (pen.)	11	27	
20	28 January 2017 14:00	A	Hansa Rostock	0–0	0			11	28	
21	4 February 2017 14:00	H	Sonnenhof Großaspach	1–1	3,783	Luge 45+3'	Leist 19'	11	29	
22	11 February 2017 14:00	A	Hallescher FC	1–1	5,683	Grüttner 82'	Pintol 45'	11	30	
23	18 February 2017 14:00	H	FSV Frankfurt	2–1	4,461	Geipl 42' (pen.); Schorch 68' (o.g.)	Kader 14'	9	33	
24	25 February 2017 14:00	A	VfR Aalen	2–1	4,281	Lais 72'; Knoll 78'	Müller 42'	3	36	
25	4 March 2017 14:00	H	Sportfreunde Lotte	2–0	6,598	Geipl 58' (pen.); Rahn 89' (o.g.)		4	39	
26	11 March 2017 14:00	A	Fortuna Köln	2–2	1498	Grüttner 44', 76'	Theisen 90+6'; Pazurek 90+9'	4	40	
27	15 March 2017 19:00	H	FSV Zwickau	1–2	6,343	Lais 6'	P. Göbel 14'; C. Göbel 37'	7	40	
28	18 March 2017 14:00	A	SC Paderborn	2–0	5,089	Lais 70'; Pusch 70'		5	43	
29	25 March 2017 14:00	H	VfL Osnabrück	1–2	10,216	Thommy 35'	Arslan 78'; Wriedt 89'	6	43	
30	1 April 2017 14:00	A	MSV Duisburg	1–1	12,345	Geipl 57' (pen.)	Iljutcenko 34'	6	44	
31	4 April 2017 19:00	H	Mainz 05 II	2–1	4,260	Odabas 23'; Thommy 35'	Seydel 21'	6	47	
32	9 April 2017 14:00	A	1. FC Magdeburg	2–1	19,627	Saller 64'; Thommy 71'	Puttkammer 62'	5	50	
33	15 April 2017 14:00	H	Werder Bremen II	3–1	6,324	Pusch 29', 61'; Thommy 55'	Manneh 64'	3	53	
34	22 April 2017 14:00	A	Wehen Wiesbaden	1–1	2,000	Thommy 32'	Dams 56'	4	54	
35	29 April 2017 14:00	H	Holstein Kiel	0–3	11,089		Schindler 8'; Ducksch 69'; Janzer 85'	5	54	
36	5 May 2017 19:00	A	Rot-Weiß Erfurt	4–1	5,645	Grüttner 10', 79'; George 30', 75'	Tyrała 26'	4	57	
37	13 May 2017 13:30	H	Chemnitzer FC	3–2	12,113	Saller 34'; Pusch 75'; Lais 90'	Breitfelder 84'; Baumgart 85'	3	60	
38	20 May 2017 13:30	A	Preußen Münster	1–0	7,008	Geipl 82' (pen.)		3	63	

==== Promotion play-off results ====
On 20 May 2016, Jahn Regensburg qualified for the promotion play-off. Regensburg won the relegation 3–1 on aggregate and was promoted to the 2. Bundesliga.

MD	Date Kickoff^{1}	H/A	Opponent	Res. F–A	Att.	Goalscorers		Ref.
MD	Date Kickoff^{1}	H/A	Opponent	Res. F–A	Att.	Jahn Regensburg	Opponent	Ref.
First leg	26 May 2016 18:00	H	TSV 1860 Munich	1–1	15,224 (sell-out)	Lais 2'	Neuhaus 78'	
Second leg	30 May 2016 18:00	A	TSV 1860 Munich	2–0	62,200	Pusch 30'; Lais 41'		

=== League table ===
Pos	Team	Pld	W	D	L	GF	GA	GD	Pts	Promotion, qualification or relegation
1	MSV Duisburg (C, P)	38	18	14	6	52	32	+20	68	Promotion to 2. Bundesliga and qualification for DFB-Pokal
2	Holstein Kiel (P)	38	18	13	7	59	25	+34	67	Promotion to 2. Bundesliga and qualification for DFB-Pokal
3	Jahn Regensburg (O, P)	38	18	9	11	62	50	+12	63	Qualification for promotion play-offs and DFB-Pokal
4	1. FC Magdeburg	38	16	13	9	53	36	+17	61	Qualification for DFB-Pokal
5	FSV Zwickau	38	16	8	14	47	54	−7	56	

Source: DFB
Rules for classification: 1) Points; 2) Goal difference; 3) Goals scored
(C) Champions; (O) Play-off winners; (P) Promoted

== DFB-Pokal ==
Win Draw Loss Postponed

RD	Date	Kickoff^{A}	Venue	City	Opponent	Result^{B}	Attendance	Goalscorers		Ref.
RD	Date	Kickoff^{A}	Venue	City	Opponent	Result^{B}	Attendance	SSV Jahn Regensburg	Opponent	Ref.
First round	21 August 2016	18:30	Continental Arena	Regensburg	Hertha BSC	1–1 (a.e.t.); 3–5 on penalties	12,526	Nandzik 51'	Weiser 83'	

== Bavarian Cup ==
=== Bavarian Cup results ===
Win Draw Loss Postponed

RD	Date	Kickoff^{A}	Venue	City	Opponent	Result^{B}	Attendance	Goalscorers		Ref.
RD	Date	Kickoff^{A}	Venue	City	Opponent	Result^{B}	Attendance	SSV Jahn Regensburg	Opponent	Ref.
1	3 August 2016	18:15	Am Schießhaus 1	Wendelstein	FG Wendelstein	5–1		Džalto 5', 11'; Luge 30'; Schöpf 65'; Hyseni 70'	Mahler 82'	
2	24 August 2016	19:00			TV Aiglsbach	2–2; 4–5 on penalties	1,200	Ziereis 7'; Hyseni 21'	Kügel 46'; Gröber 89'	

== Player information ==
As of 20 May 2017.

No.	Pos	Nat	Player	Total		3. Liga		DFB-Pokal		Bavarian Cup	
No.	Pos	Nat	Player	Apps	Goals	Apps	Goals	Apps	Goals	Apps	Goals
1	GK	(Germany) GER	Philipp Pentke	39	0	38	0	1	0	0	0
3	DF	(Germany) GER	Alexander Nandzik	30	1	29	0	1	1	0	0
4	DF	(Germany) GER	Thomas Paulus	4	0	2	0	1	0	1	0
5	DF	(Turkey) TUR	Ali Odabas	8	1	8	1	0	0	0	0
6	DF	(Germany) GER	Benedikt Saller	24	2	23	2	0	0	1	0
7	DF	(Germany) GER	Marcel Hofrath	24	0	21	0	1	0	2	0
8	MF	(Germany) GER	Andreas Geipl	34	7	32	7	1	0	1	0
9	FW	(Germany) GER	Jann George	38	10	37	10	1	0	0	0
10	MF	(Germany) GER	Marvin Knoll	39	1	37	1	1	0	1	0
11	FW	(Germany) GER	Markus Ziereis	11	1	10	0	0	0	1	1
13	DF	(Germany) GER	Sven Kopp	18	0	16	0	1	0	1	0
15	FW	(Germany) GER	Marco Grüttner	38	13	36	13	1	0	1	0
16	DF	(Lithuania) LTU	Markus Palionis	9	0	9	0	0	0	0	0
17	MF	(Germany) GER	Oliver Hein	22	1	20	1	1	0	1	0
18	MF	(Germany) GER	Marc Lais	35	7	33	7	1	0	1	0
19	FW	(Germany) GER	Patrik Džalto	9	2	6	0	1	0	2	2
20	MF	(Germany) GER	Kolja Pusch	33	6	31	6	1	0	1	0
21	MF	(Austria) AUT	Daniel Schöpf	2	1	0	0	0	0	2	1
24	MF	(Germany) GER	André Luge	18	2	16	1	0	0	2	1
25	MF	(Germany) GER	Erik Thommy	38	8	37	8	1	0	0	0
26	GK	(Germany) GER	Bastian Lerch	2	0	0	0	0	0	2	0
27	MF	(Germany) GER	Kevin Hoffmann	3	0	3	0	0	0	0	0
28	DF	(Germany) GER	Sebastian Nachreiner	21	0	21	0	0	0	0	0
30	FW	(Germany) GER	Andreas Jünger	0	0	0	0	0	0	0	0
31	MF	(Germany) GER	Uwe Hesse	28	0	26	0	0	0	2	0
32	MF	(Germany) GER	Michael Faber	2	0	1	0	0	0	1	0
33	DF	(Germany) GER	Robin Urban	7	0	6	0	0	0	1	0
34	FW	(Germany) GER	Haris Hyseni	33	3	31	1	0	0	2	2

== Notes ==
A. Kickoff time in Central European Time/Central European Summer Time.
B. SSV Jahn Regensburg goals first.
