= 2018–19 SSV Jahn Regensburg season =

SSV Jahn Regensburg
2018–19 season
- Chairman: Hans Rothammer
- Coach: Achim Beierlorzer
- Stadium: Continental Arena
- 2. Bundesliga: 8th
- DFB-Pokal: First round
- Top goalscorer: League: Sargis Adamyan (15); All: Sargis Adamyan (15)
- Highest home attendance: 15,211 (sell-out) vs. FC St. Pauli, 1. FC Köln and Hamburger SV
- Lowest home attendance: 7,736 vs. SC Paderborn 07
- Average home league attendance: 11731
- Biggest win: 5–0 vs. Hamburger SV
- Biggest defeat: 0–3 vs. Arminia Bielefeld
Home colours	Away colours	Third colours

The 2018–19 SSV Jahn Regensburg season was the 112th season in the club's football history. In 2018–19, the club played in the 2. Bundesliga, the second tier of German football. It was the club's second season back in this league after having won promotion from the 3. Liga in 2016–17.

The club also took part in the 2018–19 edition of the DFB-Pokal, the German Cup but was eliminated in the first round.

== Events ==
Regensburg had a good start in the season with a 2–1 home victory against FC Ingolstadt but had a dry spell after that. They lost the first round DFB-Pokal match against fifth-tier side BSG Chemie Leipzig 1–2 and could secure only one point out of their next four league matches. With only four points under their belt, the Jahn had to play the away match against Hamburger SV. The HSV were relegated from the Bundesliga at the end of the season before and were a big favourite for one of the promotion spots back to the Bundesliga which they confirmed by being in the first place before matchday 6. Regensburg achieved a surprising but deserved 5–0 victory over Hamburg. After this feat, they were able to secure a place in the middle of the table for the rest of the season and did not have to worry about relegation. On matchday 30, 21 April 2019, Regensburg finally could secure their place in the league for the next season.

== Transfers ==
=== In ===
No.	Pos.	Name	Age	EU	Moving from	Type	Transfer Window	Contract ends	Transfer fee	Ref.
24	DF	(Turkey) Ali Odabas	24	No	FSV Zwickau	Loan ended	Summer	30 June 2019	N/A	
34	DF	Haris Hyseni	25	Yes	SV Meppen	Loan ended	Summer	30 June 2019	N/A	
5	DF	Dominic Volkmer	22	Yes	SV Werder Bremen II		Summer	30 June 2020	Unknown	
20	MF	Maximilian Thalhammer	20	Yes	FC Ingolstadt 04	Loan	Summer	30 June 2019	N/A	
32	GK	Alexander Weidinger	21	Yes	SSV Jahn Regensburg II		Summer	30 June 2019	N/A	
26	MF	André Dej	26	Yes	Sportfreunde Lotte		Summer	30 June 2020	Unknown	
19	DF	Jonas Föhrenbach	22	Yes	SC Freiburg	Loan	Summer	30 June 2019	N/A	
14	DF	Marcel Correia	29	Yes	1. FC Kaiserslautern	Free transfer	Summer	30 June 2020	None	
10	FW	Julian Derstroff	26	Yes	SV Sandhausen	Free transfer	Summer	30 June 2020	None	
29	MF	Adrian Fein	19	Yes	FC Bayern Munich II	Loan	Summer	30 June 2019	N/A	

=== Out ===
No.	Pos.	Name	Age	EU	Moving to	Type	Transfer Window	Transfer fee	Ref.
31	MF	Uwe Hesse	30	Yes		Released	Summer	None	
26	GK	Bastian Lerch	25	Yes		Retirement	Summer	N/A	
27	MF	Marcel Hofrath	25	Yes	Fortuna Düsseldorf	Released	Summer	None	
27	MF	Marvin Knoll	28	Yes	FC St. Pauli	Transfer	Summer	Unknown	
5	DF	Benedikt Gimber	21	Yes	FC Ingolstadt 04	Loan ended	Summer	N/A	
27	MF	Kevin Hoffmann	23	Yes	FSV Zwickau	Loan	Summer	N/A	
29	FW	Joshua Mees	22	Yes	1. FC Union Berlin	Loan ended	Summer	N/A	
13	DF	Sven Kopp	23	Yes	SpVgg Bayreuth	Transfer	Winter	Unknown	
5	DF	Dominic Volkmer	22	Yes	FC Carl Zeiss Jena	Loan	Winter	N/A	

== Preseason and friendlies ==
Win Draw Loss Postponed

Date	Kickoff^{A}	Venue	City	Opponent	Res.^{B}	Att.	Goalscorers		Ref.
Date	Kickoff^{A}	Venue	City	Opponent	Res.^{B}	Att.	SSV Jahn Regensburg	Opponent	Ref.
29 June 2018	18:00		Regenstauf	TB ASV Regenstauf	13–1	1,000	Vrenezi 3'; Freis 5', 35'; George 19', 39' (pen.); Geipl 20' (pen.); Thalhammer 40'; Nietfeld 50', 78'; Stolze 54'; Hyseni 84', 88'; Dej 86'	Halo 90'	
30 June 2018	17:00		Gottfrieding	FC Gottfrieding	12–0	450	Grüttner 14'; Adamyan 32', 38'; Dej 34'; Lais 43', 45'; Geipl 46'; Pfab 52' (o.g.); George 57', 81'; Hyseni 85'; Vrenezi 87'		
6 July 2018	18:00		Rieden	1. FC Schweinfurt 05	3–2		Vrenezi 4'; Palionis 49'; Freis 59'	Jabiri 3'; Kleineheismann 83'	
7 July 2018	13:00		Cham	ASV Cham	9–1	1500	Grüttner 7'; Föhrenbach 11'; Freis 36'; Hyseni 47', 76'; Adamyan 51', 77'; Vrenezi 62'; Stolze 83'	Drexler 31'	
14 July 2018	14:00	Kaulbachweg	Regensburg	SV Wehen Wiesbaden	1–4	400	Saller 87'	Schäffler 22'; Grüttner 38' (o.g.); Brandstetter 41'; Wachs 60'	
20 July 2018	17:00		Steinsberg	FSV Zwickau	1–0		George 69' (pen.)		
21 July 2018	14:00		Natternberg	SpVgg Unterhaching	1–0		Grüttner 33'		
28 July 2018	14:00	Rothenburger Straße 50	Schnelldorf	SV Sandhausen	0–1			Jansen 68'	
29 July 2018	11:00	Kaulbachweg	Regensburg	Al-Fujairah SC	7–2		Hyseni 6'; Freis 17'; Al Ghaddioui 34', 42'; Nietfeld 39', 60' (pen.); Vrenezi 62'	Hassan; Benyettou 66'	
6 September 2018	17:00	Kaulbachweg	Regensburg	SV Ried	1–1		Al Ghaddioui 59'	Surdanovic 53'	
12 October 2018	16:00	Donauparkstadion	Linz	FC Blau-Weiß Linz	2–0		Al Ghaddioui 26'; Hyseni 24'		
15 November 2018	14:00		Schnelldorf	Karlsruher SC	0–2			Röser 21'; Çamoğlu 73'	
12 January 2019	14:00	Kaulbachweg	Regensburg	FC Liefering	10–1		Al Ghaddioui 7', 45'; Sørensen 26'; Grüttner 56', 60', 69', 74'; Adamyan 58'; Freis 62'; George 66'	Adamu 84'	
17 January 2019	14:00	Kaulbachweg	Regensburg	SG Sonnenhof Großaspach	1–0		Derstroff 23'		
19 January 2019	13:30		Würzburg	Würzburger Kickers	0–1	0		Elva 77'	
23 January 2019	13:00		Ingolstadt	FC Ingolstadt 04	0–5	0		Lezcano 14', 26'; Kittel 29'; Cohen 39', 67'	
22 March 2019	14:00	Sportplatz	Kirchheim bei München	FC Wacker Innsbruck	1–3		Nietfeld 75'	Henning 26'; Rieder 47'; Dieng 52'	

== 2. Bundesliga ==
=== 2. Bundesliga fixtures & results ===
Win Draw Loss Postponed

MD	Date Kickoff^{A}	H/A	Opponent	Res.^{B} F–A	Att.	Goalscorers		Table		Ref.
MD	Date Kickoff^{A}	H/A	Opponent	Res.^{B} F–A	Att.	SSV Jahn Regensburg	Opponent	Pos.	Pts.	Ref.
1	4 August 2018 15:30	H	FC Ingolstadt 04	2–1	13,516	Saller 45'; Ananou 72' (o.g.)	Kerschbaumer 5'	4	3	
2	10 August 2018 18:30	A	SC Paderborn 07	0–2	9,458		Gjasula 31'; Klement 61'	11	3	
3	26 August 2018 13:30	H	Holstein Kiel	0–0	9,000			11	4	
4	1 September 2018 13:00	A	Arminia Bielefeld	3–5	15,388	Grüttner 3', 52'; George 26'	Börner 8'; Voglsammer 17'; Saller 28' (o.g.); Klos 88'; Weihrauch 90+4'	13	4	
5	14 September 2018 18:30	H	Dynamo Dresden	0–2	13,629		Aosman 22'; Đumić 52'	15	4	
6	23 September 2018 13:30	A	Hamburger SV	5–0	44,716	Adamyan 11', 21', 35'; Correia 53'; George 75'		13	7	
7	26 September 2018 18:30	H	1. FC Heidenheim	2–1	8,728	Adamyan 6'; Grüttner 20'	Glatzel 9'	9	10	
8	29 September 2018 13:00	A	MSV Duisburg	3–1	11,096	Grüttner 11'; Stolze 13'; George 78' (pen.)	Gyau 24'	5	13	
9	6 October 2018 13:00	A	SpVgg Greuther Fürth	1–1	10,845	Grüttner 75'	Atanga 49'	8	14	
10	21 October 2018 13:30	H	SV Darmstadt 98	1–1	10,907	Grüttner 55'	Jones 36'	9	15	
11	29 October 2018 20:30	A	VfL Bochum	3–3	12,621	Adamyan 11'; Lais 77' (pen.); Al Ghaddioui 90+3'	Tesche 45+1'; Hinterseer 54', 65'	9	16	
12	4 November 2018 13:30	H	1. FC Union Berlin	1–1	10,884	George 45+1'	Polter 45'	9	17	
13	11 November 2018 13:30	A	1. FC Magdeburg	3–2	20,336	Grüttner 3'; Correia 81'; Al Ghaddioui 90'	Beck 5', 67'	7	20	
14	25 November 2018 13:30	H	FC St. Pauli	1–1	15,210 (sell-out)	Stolze 87'	Veerman 39'	8	21	
15	30 November 2018 18:30	A	FC Erzgebirge Aue	1–1	7,100	Grüttner 12'	Testroet 9'	10	22	
16	7 December 2018 18:30	H	1. FC Köln	1–3	15,210 (sell-out)	Adamyan 54'	Terodde 11'; Drexler 41', 55'	10	22	
17	16 December 2018 13:30	A	SV Sandhausen	2–2	4,437	Adamyan 16', 90+4'	Wooten 20'; Förster 45'	9	23	
18	22 December 2018 13:00	A	FC Ingolstadt 04	2–1	10,038	Al Ghaddioui 28', 75'	Kittel 39'	9	26	
19	30 January 2019 18:30	H	SC Paderborn 07	2–0	7,736	Thalhammer 53'; Stolze 73'		8	29	
20	3 February 2019 13:30	A	Holstein Kiel	0–2	8,235		Schindler 12'; Thesker 82'	9	29	
21	8 February 2019 18:30	H	Arminia Bielefeld	0–3	8,693		Klos 6'; Voglsammer 25' (pen.); Brunner 50'	9	29	
22	17 February 2019 13:30	A	Dynamo Dresden	0–0	25,303			9	30	
23	24 February 2019 13:30	H	Hamburger SV	2–1	15,211 (sell-out)	Adamyan 74'; Grüttner 81'	Bates 16'	8	33	
24	2 March 2019 13:00	A	1. FC Heidenheim	2–1	10,100	Grüttner 44'; Adamyan 58'	Schnatterer 50'	8	36	
25	9 March 2019 13:00	H	MSV Duisburg	1–1	10,141	Al Ghaddioui 39'	Wolze 67' (pen.)	8	37	
26	18 March 2019 20:30	H	SpVgg Greuther Fürth	0–2	11,330		Caligiuri 71'; Raum 90+5'	8	37	
27	30 March 2019 13:00	A	SV Darmstadt 98	1–1	10,385	Dursun 55'	Geipl 69'	8	38	
28	5 April 2019 18:30	H	VfL Bochum	2–1	12,363	George 54'; Grüttner 62'	Hinterseer 52' (pen.)	8	41	
29	12 April 2019 18:30	A	1. FC Union Berlin	2–2	20,243	Adamyan 16' (pen.); Al Ghaddioui 58'	Andersson 12'; Polter 83'	8	42	
30	21 April 2019 13:30	H	1. FC Magdeburg	1–0	10,543	Grüttner 20'		7	45	
31	27 April 2019 13:00	A	FC St. Pauli	3–4	29,546 (sell-out)	Al Ghaddioui 27', 40'; Adamyan 90+5'	Diamantakos 35'; Flum 52'; Knoll 72'; Miyaichi 86'	8	45	
32	5 May 2019 13:30	H	FC Erzgebirge Aue	1–3	13,425	Adamyan 56'	Testroet 52'; Nazarov 61' (pen.); Riese 90+1'	8	45	
33	12 May 2019 15:30	A	1. FC Köln	5–3	50,000 (sell-out)	Czichos 7'; Adamyan 34', 68'; Al Ghaddioui 45+5' (pen.); Föhrenbach 90'	Hector 65', 73'; Modeste 76'	8	48	
34	19 May 2019 15:30	H	SV Sandhausen	2–2	12,909	Al Ghaddioui 42', 60'	Behrens 5', 86'	8	49	

=== League table ===
Pos	Team	Pld	W	D	L	GF	GA	GD	Pts
6	Holstein Kiel	34	13	10	11	60	51	+9	49
7	Arminia Bielefeld	34	13	10	11	52	50	+2	49
8	Jahn Regensburg	34	12	13	9	55	54	+1	49
9	FC St. Pauli	34	14	7	13	46	53	−7	49
10	Darmstadt 98	34	13	7	14	45	53	−8	46

Source: DFB
Rules for classification: 1) Points; 2) Goal difference; 3) Goals scored; 4) Head-to-head points; 5) Head-to-head goal difference; 6) Head-to-head goals scored; 7) Head-to-head away goals scored; 8) Away goals scored; 9) Play-off.

== DFB-Pokal ==
Win Draw Loss Postponed

RD	Date	Kickoff^{A}	Venue	City	Opponent	Result^{B}	Attendance	Goalscorers		Ref.
RD	Date	Kickoff^{A}	Venue	City	Opponent	Result^{B}	Attendance	SSV Jahn Regensburg	Opponent	Ref.
First round	19 August 2018	15:30	Alfred-Kunze-Sportpark	Leipzig	BSG Chemie Leipzig	1–2	4,999 (sell-out)	Derstroff 20'	Wendt 69'; Druschky 90+1'	

== Player information ==
As of 22 May 2019.

No.	Pos	Nat	Player	Total		2. Liga		DFB-Pokal	
No.	Pos	Nat	Player	Apps	Goals	Apps	Goals	Apps	Goals
1	GK	(Germany) GER	Philipp Pentke	30	0	30	0	0	0
3	DF	(Germany) GER	Alexander Nandzik	15	0	14	0	1	0
4	DF	(Denmark) DEN	Asger Sørensen	28	0	27	0	1	0
5	DF	(Germany) GER	Dominic Volkmer	1	0	1	0	0	0
6	DF	(Germany) GER	Benedikt Saller	33	1	32	1	1	0
7	FW	(Kosovo) KOS	Albion Vrenezi	10	0	9	0	1	0
8	MF	(Germany) GER	Andreas Geipl	32	1	31	1	1	0
9	FW	(Germany) GER	Jann George	32	5	32	5	0	0
10	FW	(Germany) GER	Julian Derstroff	5	1	4	0	1	1
11	FW	(Germany) GER	Sebastian Freis	4	0	4	0	0	0
13	DF	(Germany) GER	Sven Kopp	0	0	0	0	0	0
14	DF	(Portugal) POR	Marcel Correia	30	2	29	2	1	0
15	FW	(Germany) GER	Marco Grüttner	33	12	32	12	1	0
16	DF	(Lithuania) LTU	Markus Palionis	5	0	5	0	0	0
17	MF	(Germany) GER	Oliver Hein	5	0	5	0	0	0
18	MF	(Germany) GER	Marc Lais	23	1	22	1	1	0
19	DF	(Germany) GER	Jonas Föhrenbach	26	1	26	1	0	0
20	MF	(Germany) GER	Maximilian Thalhammer	22	1	22	1	0	0
21	FW	(Germany) GER	Jonas Nietfeld	18	0	17	0	1	0
22	FW	(Germany) GER	Sebastian Stolze	31	3	30	3	1	0
23	FW	(Armenia) ARM	Sargis Adamyan	34	15	33	15	1	0
24	DF	(Germany) GER	Ali Odabas	0	0	0	0	0	0
25	FW	(Germany) GER	Hamadi Al Ghaddioui	33	11	33	11	0	0
26	MF	(Germany) GER	André Dej	0	0	0	0	0	0
28	DF	(Germany) GER	Sebastian Nachreiner	9	0	9	0	0	0
29	MF	(Germany) GER	Adrian Fein	21	0	21	0	0	0
32	GK	(Germany) GER	Alexander Weidinger	1	0	1	0	0	0
33	GK	(Germany) GER	André Weis	5	0	4	0	1	0
34	FW	(Germany) GER	Haris Hyseni	1	0	0	0	1	0

== Notes ==
A. Kickoff time in Central European Time/Central European Summer Time.
B. SSV Jahn Regensburg goals first.
