= List of German football transfers summer 2017 =

This is a list of German football transfers in the summer transfer window 2017 by club. Only transfers of the Bundesliga, and 2. Bundesliga are included.

== Bundesliga ==
Note: Flags indicate national team as has been defined under FIFA eligibility rules. Players may hold more than one non-FIFA nationality.

=== FC Bayern Munich ===
In:

| No. | Pos. | Nation | Player |
|---|---|---|---|
| 4 | DF | GER | Niklas Süle (from 1899 Hoffenheim) |
| 11 | MF | COL | James Rodríguez (on loan from Real Madrid) |
| 19 | MF | GER | Sebastian Rudy (from 1899 Hoffenheim) |
| 20 | DF | GER | Felix Götze (promoted from Bayern U19) |
| 24 | MF | FRA | Corentin Tolisso (from Olympique Lyonnais) |
| 29 | FW | FRA | Kingsley Coman (from Juventus, previously on loan) |
| 34 | DF | AUT | Marco Friedl (promoted from Bayern U19) |
| 36 | GK | GER | Christian Früchtl (promoted from Bayern U19) |
| -- | MF | GER | Serge Gnabry (from Werder Bremen) |

Out:

| No. | Pos. | Nation | Player |
|---|---|---|---|
| -- | MF | GER | Serge Gnabry (on loan to 1899 Hoffenheim) |
| 11 | MF | BRA | Douglas Costa (on loan to Juventus) |
| 14 | MF | ESP | Xabi Alonso (retired) |
| 21 | DF | GER | Philipp Lahm (retired) |
| 28 | DF | GER | Holger Badstuber (to VfB Stuttgart) |
| 35 | MF | POR | Renato Sanches (on loan to Swansea City) |

=== RB Leipzig ===
In:

| No. | Pos. | Nation | Player |
|---|---|---|---|
| 6 | DF | FRA | Ibrahima Konaté (from FC Sochaux-Montbéliard) |
| 17 | MF | POR | Bruma (from Galatasaray) |
| 18 | GK | SUI | Yvon Mvogo (from BSC Young Boys) |
| 22 | GK | SUI | Philipp Köhn (from VfB Stuttgart youth) |
| 27 | MF | AUT | Konrad Laimer (from Red Bull Salzburg) |
| 29 | FW | FRA | Jean-Kévin Augustin (from Paris Saint-Germain) |
| 44 | MF | SLO | Kevin Kampl (from Bayer 04 Leverkusen) |

Out:

| No. | Pos. | Nation | Player |
|---|---|---|---|
| -- | FW | GER | Nils Quaschner (to Arminia Bielefeld) |
| -- | DF | GER | Anthony Jung (on loan to Brøndby IF) |
| 6 | MF | GER | Rani Khedira (to FC Augsburg) |
| 19 | MF | SCO | Oliver Burke (to West Bromwich Albion) |
| 21 | GK | GER | Marius Müller (on loan to 1. FC Kaiserslautern) |
| 27 | FW | GER | Davie Selke (to Hertha BSC) |
| 36 | DF | GER | Ken Gipson (to SV Sandhausen) |

=== Borussia Dortmund ===
In:

| No. | Pos. | Nation | Player |
|---|---|---|---|
| 2 | DF | FRA | Dan-Axel Zagadou (from Paris Saint-Germain Academy) |
| 7 | MF | ENG | Jadon Sancho (from Manchester City U18) |
| 9 | FW | UKR | Andriy Yarmolenko (from Dynamo Kyiv) |
| 15 | DF | GER | Jeremy Toljan (from 1899 Hoffenheim) |
| 19 | MF | SYR | Mahmoud Dahoud (from Borussia Mönchengladbach) |
| 20 | MF | GER | Maximilian Philipp (from SC Freiburg) |
| 36 | DF | TUR | Ömer Toprak (from Bayer 04 Leverkusen) |

Out:

| No. | Pos. | Nation | Player |
|---|---|---|---|
| 6 | MF | GER | Sven Bender (to Bayer 04 Leverkusen) |
| 7 | FW | FRA | Ousmane Dembélé (to FC Barcelona) |
| 9 | MF | TUR | Emre Mor (to Celta de Vigo) |
| 15 | MF | GER | Pascal Stenzel (to SC Freiburg, previously on loan) |
| 20 | FW | COL | Adrián Ramos (to Chongqing Lifan, previously on loan at Granada CF) |
| 24 | MF | ESP | Mikel Merino (on loan to Newcastle United) |
| 28 | DF | GER | Matthias Ginter (to Borussia Mönchengladbach) |
| 30 | DF | GER | Felix Passlack (on loan to 1899 Hoffenheim) |
| 32 | MF | GER | Dženis Burnić (on loan to VfB Stuttgart) |

=== 1899 Hoffenheim ===
In:

| No. | Pos. | Nation | Player |
|---|---|---|---|
| 6 | MF | NOR | Håvard Nordtveit (from West Ham United) |
| 11 | MF | AUT | Florian Grillitsch (from Werder Bremen) |
| 16 | DF | GER | Nico Schulz (from Borussia Mönchengladbach) |
| 20 | MF | AUT | Robert Žulj (from Greuther Fürth) |
| 24 | DF | NED | Justin Hoogma (from Heracles Almelo) |
| 29 | MF | GER | Serge Gnabry (on loan from Bayern Munich) |
| 31 | DF | GER | Felix Passlack (on loan from Borussia Dortmund) |

Out:

| No. | Pos. | Nation | Player |
|---|---|---|---|
| 5 | DF | SUI | Fabian Schär (to Deportivo de La Coruña) |
| 6 | MF | GER | Sebastian Rudy (to Bayern Munich) |
| 12 | DF | BRA | Danilo Soares (to VfL Bochum) |
| 15 | DF | GER | Jeremy Toljan (to Borussia Dortmund) |
| 16 | MF | SUI | Pirmin Schwegler (to Hannover 96) |
| 23 | MF | GER | Marco Terrazzino (to SC Freiburg) |
| 25 | DF | GER | Niklas Süle (to Bayern Munich) |
| -- | DF | GER | Nicolai Rapp (to Erzgebirge Aue, previously on loan at Greuther Fürth) |
| -- | DF | GER | Benedikt Gimber (on loan to Jahn Regensburg) |
| -- | MF | USA | Russell Canouse (to D.C. United, previously on loan at VfL Bochum) |
| -- | MF | TUR | Barış Atik (on loan to 1. FC Kaiserslautern) |
| -- | FW | CRO | Antonio Čolak (on loan to FC Ingolstadt) |

=== 1. FC Köln ===
In:

| No. | Pos. | Nation | Player |
|---|---|---|---|
| 15 | FW | COL | Jhon Córdoba (from Mainz 05) |
| 22 | DF | ESP | Jorge Meré (from Sporting de Gijón) |
| 23 | DF | GER | Jannes Horn (from VfL Wolfsburg) |
| 25 | DF | POR | João Queirós (from S.C. Braga B) |

Out:

| No. | Pos. | Nation | Player |
|---|---|---|---|
| 27 | FW | FRA | Anthony Modeste (on loan to Tianjin Quanjian) |
| 30 | MF | GER | Marcel Hartel (to Union Berlin) |

=== Hertha BSC ===
In:

| No. | Pos. | Nation | Player |
|---|---|---|---|
| 4 | DF | NED | Karim Rekik (from Olympique de Marseille) |
| 11 | FW | AUS | Mathew Leckie (from FC Ingolstadt) |
| 12 | GK | USA | Jonathan Klinsmann (from California Golden Bears) |
| 20 | MF | AUT | Valentino Lazaro (on loan from Red Bull Salzburg) |
| 27 | FW | GER | Davie Selke (from RB Leipzig) |

Out:

| No. | Pos. | Nation | Player |
|---|---|---|---|
| 9 | MF | GER | Alexander Baumjohann (to Coritiba) |
| 11 | FW | TUN | Sami Allagui (to FC St. Pauli) |
| 25 | DF | USA | John Brooks (to VfL Wolfsburg) |
| 29 | GK | GER | Nils Körber (on loan to Preußen Münster) |
| 31 | MF | GER | Florian Kohls (to Würzburger Kickers) |

=== SC Freiburg ===
In:

| No. | Pos. | Nation | Player |
|---|---|---|---|
| 3 | DF | AUT | Philipp Lienhart (on loan from Real Madrid Castilla) |
| 13 | MF | GER | Marco Terrazzino (from 1899 Hoffenheim) |
| 15 | MF | GER | Pascal Stenzel (from Borussia Dortmund, previously on loan) |
| 14 | MF | ENG | Ryan Kent (on loan from Liverpool) |
| 16 | MF | FRA | Yoric Ravet (from BSC Young Boys) |
| 25 | DF | GER | Robin Koch (from 1. FC Kaiserslautern) |
| 32 | MF | POL | Bartosz Kapustka (on loan from Leicester City) |
| -- | MF | GER | Lino Tempelmann (from 1860 Munich) |

Out:

| No. | Pos. | Nation | Player |
|---|---|---|---|
| -- | MF | GER | Sebastian Kerk (to 1. FC Nürnberg, previously on loan at 1. FC Kaiserslautern) |
| 3 | DF | ESP | Marc Torrejón (to Union Berlin) |
| 14 | FW | NOR | Håvard Nielsen (to Fortuna Düsseldorf) |
| 25 | DF | GER | Jonas Föhrenbach (on loan to Karlsruher SC) |
| 26 | MF | GER | Maximilian Philipp (to Borussia Dortmund) |
| 32 | MF | ITA | Vincenzo Grifo (to Borussia Mönchengladbach) |

=== Werder Bremen ===
In:

| No. | Pos. | Nation | Player |
|---|---|---|---|
| 1 | GK | CZE | Jiří Pavlenka (from Slavia Prague) |
| 5 | DF | SWE | Ludwig Augustinsson (from F.C. Copenhagen) |
| 8 | MF | GER | Jérôme Gondorf (from Darmstadt 98) |
| 19 | FW | CHN | Zhang Yuning (on loan from West Bromwich Albion) |
| 29 | FW | ALG | Ishak Belfodil (on loan from Standard Liège) |

Out:

| No. | Pos. | Nation | Player |
|---|---|---|---|
| -- | DF | GER | Leon Guwara (on loan to 1. FC Kaiserslautern) |
| -- | MF | HUN | László Kleinheisler (on loan to FC Astana) |
| 1 | GK | GER | Raphael Wolf (to Fortuna Düsseldorf) |
| 2 | DF | ARG | Santiago García (to Deportivo Toluca) |
| 5 | MF | MLI | Sambou Yatabaré (on loan to Royal Antwerp) |
| 11 | FW | GER | Lennart Thy (on loan to VVV-Venlo, previously on loan at FC St. Pauli) |
| 14 | FW | PER | Claudio Pizarro (released) |
| 19 | DF | GER | Luca-Milan Zander (on loan to FC St. Pauli) |
| 25 | MF | GRE | Thanos Petsos (on loan to Rapid Wien, previously on loan at Fulham) |
| 27 | MF | AUT | Florian Grillitsch (to 1899 Hoffenheim) |
| 29 | MF | GER | Serge Gnabry (to Bayern Munich) |
| 38 | DF | GER | Marnon Busch (to 1. FC Heidenheim) |
| 41 | MF | GER | Levent Ayçiçek (to Greuther Fürth, previously on loan at 1860 Munich) |
| 42 | GK | GER | Felix Wiedwald (to Leeds United) |

=== Borussia Mönchengladbach ===
In:

| No. | Pos. | Nation | Player |
|---|---|---|---|
| 3 | DF | ENG | Reece Oxford (on loan from West Ham United) |
| 8 | MF | SUI | Denis Zakaria (from BSC Young Boys) |
| 26 | FW | PAR | Raúl Bobadilla (from FC Augsburg) |
| 27 | MF | FRA | Michaël Cuisance (from AS Nancy) |
| 28 | DF | GER | Matthias Ginter (from Borussia Dortmund) |
| 32 | MF | ITA | Vincenzo Grifo (from SC Freiburg) |
| -- | MF | GER | Florian Neuhaus (from 1860 Munich) |

Out:

| No. | Pos. | Nation | Player |
|---|---|---|---|
| 8 | MF | GER | Mahmoud Dahoud (to Borussia Dortmund) |
| 14 | DF | GER | Nico Schulz (to 1899 Hoffenheim) |
| 15 | DF | GER | Marvin Schulz (to FC Luzern) |
| 20 | MF | SUI | Djibril Sow (to BSC Young Boys) |
| 25 | DF | FRA | Timothée Kolodziejczak (to Tigres UANL) |
| 26 | MF | GER | Tsiy-William Ndenge (on loan to Roda JC Kerkrade) |
| 27 | DF | GER | Julian Korb (to Hannover 96) |
| 28 | FW | GER | André Hahn (to Hamburger SV) |
| -- | MF | GER | Florian Neuhaus (on loan to Fortuna Düsseldorf) |

=== FC Schalke 04 ===
In:

| No. | Pos. | Nation | Player |
|---|---|---|---|
| 3 | DF | ESP | Pablo Insua (from Deportivo de La Coruña) |
| 24 | DF | GER | Bastian Oczipka (from Eintracht Frankfurt) |
| 25 | MF | FRA | Amine Harit (from FC Nantes) |
| 34 | GK | AUT | Michael Langer (from IFK Norrköping) |

Out:

| No. | Pos. | Nation | Player |
|---|---|---|---|
| -- | FW | GER | Felix Platte (to Darmstadt 98, previously on loan) |
| -- | MF | GER | Sidney Sam (to VfL Bochum, previously on loan at Darmstadt 98) |
| 4 | DF | GER | Benedikt Höwedes (on loan to Juventus) |
| 5 | MF | GER | Johannes Geis (on loan to Sevilla FC) |
| 6 | DF | BIH | Sead Kolašinac (to Arsenal) |
| 13 | MF | CMR | Eric Maxim Choupo-Moting (to Stoke City) |
| 15 | DF | GER | Dennis Aogo (to VfB Stuttgart) |
| 21 | DF | GER | Luke Hemmerich (on loan to VfL Bochum) |
| 22 | DF | JPN | Atsuto Uchida (to Union Berlin) |
| 25 | FW | NED | Klaas-Jan Huntelaar (to AFC Ajax) |
| 32 | FW | GHA | Bernard Tekpetey (on loan to Rheindorf Altach) |
| 34 | GK | GER | Fabian Giefer (to FC Augsburg) |
| 39 | FW | USA | Haji Wright (on loan to SV Sandhausen) |
| 40 | DF | GER | Phil Neumann (to FC Ingolstadt) |

=== Eintracht Frankfurt ===
In:

| No. | Pos. | Nation | Player |
|---|---|---|---|
| 3 | DF | FRA | Simon Falette (from FC Metz) |
| 4 | MF | NED | Jonathan de Guzmán (from Napoli, previously on loan to Chievo Verona) |
| 5 | MF | SUI | Gelson Fernandes (from Stade Rennais) |
| 8 | FW | SRB | Luka Jović (on loan from S.L. Benfica) |
| 9 | FW | FRA | Sébastien Haller (from FC Utrecht) |
| 13 | DF | MEX | Carlos Salcedo (on loan from C.D. Guadalajara, previously on loan to ACF Fiorentina) |
| 15 | DF | NED | Jetro Willems (from PSV Eindhoven) |
| 17 | MF | GHA | Kevin-Prince Boateng (from UD Las Palmas) |
| 24 | DF | GER | Danny da Costa (from Bayer 04 Leverkusen) |
| 37 | GK | GER | Jan Zimmermann (from 1860 Munich) |
| 40 | MF | JPN | Daichi Kamada (from Sagan Tosu) |

Out:

| No. | Pos. | Nation | Player |
|---|---|---|---|
| 3 | DF | URU | Guillermo Varela (loan return to Manchester United) |
| 5 | DF | ESP | Jesús Vallejo (loan return to Real Madrid) |
| 6 | DF | GER | Bastian Oczipka (to FC Schalke 04) |
| 9 | FW | SUI | Haris Seferovic (to S.L. Benfica) |
| 13 | GK | AUT | Heinz Lindner (to Grasshopper Club Zürich) |
| 15 | DF | JAM | Michael Hector (loan return to Chelsea) |
| 30 | FW | SUI | Shani Tarashaj (loan return to Everton) |
| 36 | DF | GER | Furkan Zorba (to VfL Osnabrück) |

=== Bayer 04 Leverkusen ===
In:

| No. | Pos. | Nation | Player |
|---|---|---|---|
| 3 | DF | GRE | Panagiotis Retsos (from Olympiacos) |
| 5 | MF | GER | Sven Bender (from Borussia Dortmund) |
| 21 | MF | GER | Dominik Kohr (from FC Augsburg) |

Out:

| No. | Pos. | Nation | Player |
|---|---|---|---|
| -- | DF | GER | Robin Becker (to Eintracht Braunschweig) |
| -- | DF | GRE | Kyriakos Papadopoulos (to Hamburger SV, previously on loan) |
| -- | FW | CRO | Marc Brašnić (to Viktoria Köln, previously on loan at Fortuna Köln) |
| 6 | DF | AUT | Aleksandar Dragović (on loan to Leicester City) |
| 7 | FW | MEX | Javier Hernández (to West Ham United) |
| 10 | MF | TUR | Hakan Çalhanoğlu (to A.C. Milan) |
| 13 | DF | GER | Roberto Hilbert (released) |
| 21 | DF | TUR | Ömer Toprak (to Borussia Dortmund) |
| 23 | DF | GER | Danny da Costa (to Eintracht Frankfurt) |
| 24 | MF | KOR | Ryu Seung-woo (to Jeju United) |
| 34 | DF | GER | Joel Abu Hanna (to 1. FC Kaiserslautern) |
| 44 | MF | SLO | Kevin Kampl (to RB Leipzig) |

=== FC Augsburg ===
In:

| No. | Pos. | Nation | Player |
|---|---|---|---|
| 7 | FW | GER | Marcel Heller (from Darmstadt 98) |
| 8 | MF | GER | Rani Khedira (from RB Leipzig) |
| 11 | MF | AUT | Michael Gregoritsch (from Hamburger SV) |
| 13 | GK | GER | Fabian Giefer (from FC Schalke 04) |
| 21 | FW | VEN | Sergio Córdova (from Caracas FC) |
| 25 | DF | GER | Kilian Jakob (from 1860 Munich) |

Out:

| No. | Pos. | Nation | Player |
|---|---|---|---|
| 2 | DF | NED | Paul Verhaegh (to VfL Wolfsburg) |
| 7 | MF | TUR | Halil Altintop (to Slavia Prague) |
| 21 | MF | GER | Dominik Kohr (to Bayer 04 Leverkusen) |
| 23 | FW | SLO | Tim Matavž (to SBV Vitesse) |
| 25 | FW | PAR | Raúl Bobadilla (to Borussia Mönchengladbach) |
| 33 | FW | GER | Julian Günther-Schmidt (on loan to FC Carl Zeiss Jena) |
| 39 | MF | JPN | Takashi Usami (on loan to Fortuna Düsseldorf) |

=== Hamburger SV ===
In:

| No. | Pos. | Nation | Player |
|---|---|---|---|
| 4 | DF | NED | Rick van Drongelen (from Sparta Rotterdam) |
| 9 | DF | GRE | Kyriakos Papadopoulos (from Bayer 04 Leverkusen, previously on loan) |
| 11 | FW | GER | André Hahn (from Borussia Mönchengladbach) |
| 13 | GK | GER | Julian Pollersbeck (from 1. FC Kaiserslautern) |
| 22 | DF | GER | Bjarne Thoelke (from Karlsruher SC) |

Out:

| No. | Pos. | Nation | Player |
|---|---|---|---|
| -- | MF | GER | Arianit Ferati (on loan to Erzgebirge Aue) |
| 1 | GK | GER | René Adler (to Mainz 05) |
| 5 | DF | SUI | Johan Djourou (to Antalyaspor) |
| 10 | FW | GER | Pierre-Michel Lasogga (on loan to Leeds United) |
| 11 | MF | AUT | Michael Gregoritsch (to FC Augsburg) |
| 21 | MF | SWE | Nabil Bahoui (to Grasshopper Club Zürich) |
| 22 | DF | GER | Matthias Ostrzolek (to Hannover 96) |
| 34 | MF | GER | Finn Porath (on loan to SpVgg Unterhaching) |
| 43 | FW | TUR | Batuhan Altıntaş (on loan to Yeni Malatyaspor, previously on loan at Kasımpaşa) |

=== 1. FSV Mainz 05 ===
In:

| No. | Pos. | Nation | Player |
|---|---|---|---|
| 1 | GK | GER | René Adler (from Hamburger SV) |
| 4 | DF | FRA | Abdou Diallo (from AS Monaco) |
| 19 | FW | BIH | Kenan Kodro (from CA Osasuna) |
| 10 | MF | ROU | Alexandru Maxim (from VfB Stuttgart) |
| 14 | MF | DEN | Viktor Fischer (from Middlesbrough) |

Out:

| No. | Pos. | Nation | Player |
|---|---|---|---|
| -- | DF | SWE | Pierre Bengtsson (to F.C. Copenhagen, previously on loan at SC Bastia) |
| -- | MF | GER | Maximilian Beister (released) |
| 1 | GK | DEN | Jonas Lössl (on loan to Huddersfield Town) |
| 5 | MF | ESP | José Rodríguez (on loan to Maccabi Tel Aviv, previously on loan at Málaga CF) |
| 15 | FW | COL | Jhon Córdoba (to 1. FC Köln) |
| 29 | MF | GER | Devante Parker (on loan to SKN St. Pölten) |
| 30 | MF | KOS | Besar Halimi (on loan to Brøndby IF) |
| 36 | FW | GER | Aaron Seydel (on loan to Holstein Kiel) |

=== VfL Wolfsburg ===
In:

| No. | Pos. | Nation | Player |
|---|---|---|---|
| 2 | DF | BRA | William (from Sport Club Internacional) |
| 3 | DF | NED | Paul Verhaegh (from FC Augsburg) |
| 4 | MF | ESP | Ignacio Camacho (from Málaga CF) |
| 9 | FW | BEL | Landry Dimata (from K.V. Oostende) |
| 14 | FW | BEL | Divock Origi (on loan from Liverpool) |
| 17 | DF | GER | Ohis Felix Uduokhai (from 1860 Munich) |
| 25 | DF | USA | John Brooks (from Hertha BSC) |
| 29 | DF | COD | Marcel Tisserand (on loan from FC Ingolstadt) |
| 32 | FW | ENG | Kaylen Hinds (from Arsenal) |
| 34 | MF | GER | Marvin Stefaniak (from Dynamo Dresden) |

Out:

| No. | Pos. | Nation | Player |
|---|---|---|---|
| -- | GK | GER | Patrick Drewes (to Würzburger Kickers) |
| 1 | GK | SUI | Diego Benaglio (to AS Monaco) |
| 2 | DF | GER | Philipp Wollscheid (loan return to Stoke City) |
| 8 | MF | POR | Vieirinha (to PAOK FC) |
| 15 | DF | GER | Christian Träsch (to FC Ingolstadt) |
| 17 | FW | ESP | Borja Mayoral (loan return to Real Madrid) |
| 21 | DF | GER | Jannes Horn (to 1. FC Köln) |
| 22 | MF | BRA | Luiz Gustavo (to Olympique de Marseille) |
| 29 | MF | GER | Amara Condé (on loan to Holstein Kiel) |
| 30 | MF | GER | Paul Seguin (on loan to Dynamo Dresden) |
| 34 | DF | SUI | Ricardo Rodríguez (to A.C. Milan) |
| 38 | MF | BEL | Ismail Azzaoui (on loan to Willem II) |
| 41 | DF | GER | Hendrik Hansen (to Würzburger Kickers) |
| 68 | MF | SUI | Francisco Rodríguez (to FC Luzern) |

=== VfB Stuttgart ===
In:

| No. | Pos. | Nation | Player |
|---|---|---|---|
| 3 | DF | GER | Dennis Aogo (from FC Schalke 04) |
| 6 | MF | ARG | Santiago Ascacíbar (from Estudiantes de La Plata) |
| 14 | FW | GRE | Anastasios Donis (from Juventus, previously on loan at OGC Nice) |
| 16 | GK | GER | Ron-Robert Zieler (from Leicester City) |
| 19 | MF | COD | Chadrac Akolo (from FC Sion) |
| 23 | MF | BEL | Orel Mangala (from R.S.C. Anderlecht, previously on loan at Borussia Dortmund) |
| 24 | MF | GER | Dženis Burnić (on loan from Borussia Dortmund) |
| 26 | GK | GER | Alexander Meyer (from FC Energie Cottbus) |
| 28 | DF | GER | Holger Badstuber (from Bayern Munich) |
| 29 | DF | BRA | Ailton (from G.D. Estoril Praia) |
| 32 | DF | GER | Andreas Beck (from Beşiktaş) |

Out:

| No. | Pos. | Nation | Player |
|---|---|---|---|
| -- | DF | BIH | Toni Šunjić (to FC Dynamo Moscow) |
| -- | FW | UKR | Borys Tashchy (to MSV Duisburg, previously on loan to FC Zbrojovka Brno) |
| 1 | GK | AUS | Mitchell Langerak (to Levante UD) |
| 4 | DF | FRA | Jérôme Onguéné (on loan to Red Bull Salzburg) |
| 6 | DF | GER | Jean Zimmer (on loan to Fortuna Düsseldorf) |
| 10 | MF | ROU | Alexandru Maxim (to Mainz 05) |
| 16 | DF | AUT | Florian Klein (to Austria Wien) |
| 17 | MF | GER | Tobias Werner (on loan to 1. FC Nürnberg) |
| 18 | MF | GHA | Hans Nunoo Sarpei (on loan to FK Senica) |
| 28 | MF | GER | Marvin Wanitzek (to Karlsruher SC) |
| 37 | FW | USA | Julian Green (on loan to Greuther Fürth) |

=== Hannover 96 ===
In:

| No. | Pos. | Nation | Player |
|---|---|---|---|
| 4 | DF | GER | Julian Korb (from Borussia Mönchengladbach) |
| 9 | FW | BRA | Jonathas (from FC Rubin Kazan) |
| 13 | FW | TOG | Ihlas Bebou (from Fortuna Düsseldorf) |
| 22 | DF | GER | Matthias Ostrzolek (from Hamburger SV) |
| 23 | GK | GER | Michael Esser (from Darmstadt 98) |
| 27 | MF | SUI | Pirmin Schwegler (from 1899 Hoffenheim) |

Out:

| No. | Pos. | Nation | Player |
|---|---|---|---|
| 4 | DF | NOR | Stefan Strandberg (loan return to FC Krasnodar) |
| 9 | FW | POL | Artur Sobiech (to Darmstadt 98) |
| 13 | GK | CRO | Marko Marić (loan return to 1899 Hoffenheim) |
| 15 | MF | GER | André Hoffmann (to Fortuna Düsseldorf) |
| 29 | FW | SEN | Babacar Guèye (on loan to Sint-Truidense V.V.) |
| 39 | FW | TUR | Mevlüt Erdinç (to İstanbul Başakşehir) |
| 40 | GK | GER | Timo Königsmann (to Greuther Fürth) |

== 2. Bundesliga ==
=== FC Ingolstadt 04 ===
In:

| No. | Pos. | Nation | Player |
|---|---|---|---|
| 4 | DF | BRA | Paulo Otávio (from LASK Linz) |
| 7 | FW | CRO | Antonio Čolak (on loan from 1899 Hoffenheim) |
| 16 | GK | AUT | Marco Knaller (from SV Sandhausen) |
| 19 | MF | GER | Marcel Gaus (from 1. FC Kaiserslautern) |
| 20 | FW | GER | Stefan Kutschke (from 1. FC Nürnberg) |
| 21 | MF | GER | Tobias Schröck (from Würzburger Kickers) |
| 22 | MF | JPN | Takahiro Sekine (from Urawa Red Diamonds) |
| 26 | DF | GER | Phil Neumann (from FC Schalke 04) |
| 28 | DF | GER | Christian Träsch (from VfL Wolfsburg) |

Out:

| No. | Pos. | Nation | Player |
|---|---|---|---|
| 3 | DF | GER | Anthony Jung (loan return to RB Leipzig) |
| 7 | FW | AUS | Mathew Leckie (to Hertha BSC) |
| 10 | MF | GER | Pascal Groß (to Brighton & Hove Albion) |
| 16 | FW | AUT | Lukas Hinterseer (to VfL Bochum) |
| 22 | MF | GER | Nico Rinderknecht (on loan to Preußen Münster) |
| 29 | DF | AUT | Markus Suttner (to Brighton & Hove Albion) |
| 32 | DF | COD | Marcel Tisserand (on loan to VfL Wolfsburg) |
| 33 | DF | SUI | Florent Hadergjonaj (on loan to Huddersfield Town) |
| 35 | GK | DEN | Martin Hansen (on loan to SC Heerenveen) |
| 39 | GK | GER | Christian Ortag (to Stuttgarter Kickers) |

=== SV Darmstadt 98 ===
In:

| No. | Pos. | Nation | Player |
|---|---|---|---|
| 2 | DF | BRA | Pará (from Brusque Futebol Clube) |
| 6 | MF | GER | Marvin Mehlem (from Karlsruher SC) |
| 7 | FW | GER | Felix Platte (from FC Schalke 04, previously on loan) |
| 8 | MF | GER | Julian von Haacke (from NEC) |
| 9 | FW | AUS | Jamie Maclaren (from Brisbane Roar FC) |
| 11 | MF | GER | Tobias Kempe (from 1. FC Nürnberg) |
| 19 | MF | GER | Kevin Großkreutz (free agent) |
| 20 | FW | POL | Artur Sobiech (from Hannover 96) |
| 23 | GK | SUI | Joël Mall (from Grasshopper Club Zürich) |
| 27 | MF | USA | McKinze Gaines (from VfL Wolfsburg U19) |
| 31 | GK | GER | Florian Stritzel (from Karlsruher SC) |
| 33 | DF | CHN | Hu Ruibao (on loan from Vejle Boldklub) |
| 38 | MF | FRA | Romuald Lacazette (from 1860 Munich) |

Out:

| No. | Pos. | Nation | Player |
|---|---|---|---|
| 2 | DF | GER | Leon Guwara (loan return to Werder Bremen) |
| 6 | MF | BIH | Mario Vrančić (to Norwich City) |
| 8 | MF | GER | Jérôme Gondorf (to Werder Bremen) |
| 9 | FW | GER | Dominik Stroh-Engel (to Karlsruher SC) |
| 16 | FW | CRO | Antonio Čolak (loan return to 1899 Hoffenheim) |
| 20 | FW | GER | Marcel Heller (to FC Augsburg) |
| 31 | GK | GER | Michael Esser (to Hannover 96) |
| 33 | MF | GER | Sidney Sam (loan return to FC Schalke 04) |

=== Eintracht Braunschweig ===
In:

| No. | Pos. | Nation | Player |
|---|---|---|---|
| 2 | DF | GER | Steve Breitkreuz (from Erzgebirge Aue) |
| 7 | MF | GER | Özkan Yıldırım (from Fortuna Düsseldorf) |
| 13 | MF | GER | Louis Samson (from Erzgebirge Aue) |
| 14 | DF | GER | Robin Becker (from Bayer 04 Leverkusen) |
| 17 | DF | GER | Steffen Nkansah (from Borussia Mönchengladbach II) |
| 33 | GK | NED | Eric Verstappen (from De Graafschap) |

Out:

| No. | Pos. | Nation | Player |
|---|---|---|---|
| 3 | DF | SUI | Saulo Decarli (to Club Brugge) |
| 8 | MF | POL | Adam Matuszczyk (to Zagłębie Lubin) |
| 12 | MF | SLO | Nik Omladič (to Greuther Fürth) |
| 17 | DF | GHA | Phil Ofosu-Ayeh (to Wolverhampton Wanderers) |
| 25 | DF | POR | Marcel Correia (to 1. FC Kaiserslautern) |

=== 1. FC Union Berlin ===
In:

| No. | Pos. | Nation | Player |
|---|---|---|---|
| 2 | DF | JPN | Atsuto Uchida (from FC Schalke 04) |
| 3 | DF | AUT | Christoph Schößwendter (from Rapid Wien) |
| 7 | MF | GER | Marcel Hartel (from 1. FC Köln) |
| 11 | MF | GER | Akaki Gogia (from Brentford, previously on loan to Dynamo Dresden) |
| 13 | DF | GER | Peter Kurzweg (from Würzburger Kickers) |
| 15 | DF | ESP | Marc Torrejón (from SC Freiburg) |
| 21 | MF | GER | Grischa Prömel (from Karlsruher SC) |

Out:

| No. | Pos. | Nation | Player |
|---|---|---|---|
| 3 | DF | AUT | Emanuel Pogatetz (to LASK Linz) |
| 5 | DF | GER | Benjamin Kessel (to 1. FC Kaiserslautern) |
| 11 | MF | GER | Maximilian Thiel (to 1. FC Heidenheim) |
| 27 | MF | KOS | Eroll Zejnullahu (on loan to SV Sandhausen) |
| 39 | MF | GER | Lukas Lämmel (released) |

=== Dynamo Dresden ===
In:

| No. | Pos. | Nation | Player |
|---|---|---|---|
| 8 | MF | GER | Rico Benatelli (from Würzburger Kickers) |
| 9 | FW | GER | Lucas Röser (from SG Sonnenhof Großaspach) |
| 11 | MF | BIH | Haris Duljević (from FK Sarajevo) |
| 14 | FW | TOG | Peniel Mlapa (from VfL Bochum) |
| 19 | MF | GER | Paul Seguin (on loan from VfL Wolfsburg) |
| 21 | FW | FIN | Eero Markkanen (on loan from AIK Fotboll) |
| 22 | MF | AUT | Patrick Möschl (from SV Ried) |
| 26 | DF | GER | Sören Gonther (from FC St. Pauli) |
| 29 | MF | AUT | Sascha Horvath (from Sturm Graz) |

Out:

| No. | Pos. | Nation | Player |
|---|---|---|---|
| -- | MF | TUR | Sinan Tekerci (to FSV Zwickau, previously on loan to Preußen Münster) |
| 2 | MF | GER | Akaki Gogia (loan return to Brentford) |
| 3 | DF | GER | Marc Wachs (on loan to VfL Osnabrück) |
| 4 | DF | ARG | Giuliano Modica (to 1. FC Kaiserslautern) |
| 8 | DF | GER | Nils Teixeira (from Arminia Bielefeld) |
| 10 | MF | GER | Marvin Stefaniak (to VfL Wolfsburg) |
| 21 | DF | GER | Hendrik Starostzik (to Hallescher FC) |
| 28 | DF | GER | Niklas Landgraf (to Hallescher FC) |
| 30 | FW | GER | Stefan Kutschke (loan return to 1. FC Nürnberg) |
| 33 | MF | GER | Marcel Hilßner (to Hansa Rostock) |

=== 1. FC Heidenheim ===
In:

| No. | Pos. | Nation | Player |
|---|---|---|---|
| 2 | DF | GER | Marnon Busch (from Werder Bremen, previously on loan at 1860 Munich) |
| 10 | MF | AUT | Nikola Dovedan (from Rheindorf Altach) |
| 21 | MF | GER | Maximilian Thiel (from Union Berlin) |
| 27 | MF | GER | Kolja Pusch (from Jahn Regensburg) |

Out:

| No. | Pos. | Nation | Player |
|---|---|---|---|
| 8 | MF | AUT | Martin Rasner (to SKN St. Pölten) |
| 16 | DF | GER | Robin Becker (loan return to Bayer 04 Leverkusen) |

=== FC St. Pauli ===
In:

| No. | Pos. | Nation | Player |
|---|---|---|---|
| 2 | DF | GER | Clemens Schoppenhauer (from Würzburger Kickers) |
| 11 | FW | TUN | Sami Allagui (from Hertha BSC) |
| 19 | DF | GER | Luca-Milan Zander (on loan from Werder Bremen) |
| 22 | MF | TUR | Cenk Şahin (from İstanbul Başakşehir, previously on loan) |

Out:

| No. | Pos. | Nation | Player |
|---|---|---|---|
| 18 | FW | GER | Lennart Thy (loan return to Werder Bremen) |
| 24 | FW | GER | Nico Empen (to ETSV Weiche) |
| 25 | MF | GER | Dennis Rosin (to Werder Bremen II) |
| 26 | DF | GER | Sören Gonther (to Dynamo Dresden) |

=== SpVgg Greuther Fürth ===
In:

| No. | Pos. | Nation | Player |
|---|---|---|---|
| 3 | DF | GER | Maximilian Wittek (from 1860 Munich) |
| 5 | DF | SWE | Richard Magyar (from Hammarby Fotboll) |
| 7 | MF | GER | Levent Ayçiçek (from Werder Bremen, previously on loan at 1860 Munich) |
| 8 | FW | USA | Julian Green (on loan from VfB Stuttgart) |
| 11 | FW | GER | Philipp Hofmann (from Brentford) |
| 15 | MF | GER | Sebastian Ernst (from Würzburger Kickers) |
| 17 | MF | ESP | Manuel Torres (from Karlsruher SC) |
| 22 | DF | CRO | Mario Maloča (on loan from Lechia Gdańsk) |
| 25 | GK | GER | Timo Königsmann (from Hannover 96) |
| 33 | MF | SLO | Nik Omladič (from Eintracht Braunschweig) |

Out:

| No. | Pos. | Nation | Player |
|---|---|---|---|
| 1 | GK | GER | Sebastian Mielitz (to SønderjyskE Fodbold) |
| 5 | DF | GER | Nicolai Rapp (loan return to 1899 Hoffenheim) |
| 7 | DF | GER | Niko Gießelmann (to Fortuna Düsseldorf) |
| 9 | FW | GER | Sebastian Freis (to Jahn Regensburg) |
| 17 | MF | NOR | Zlatko Tripić (released) |
| 19 | FW | NOR | Veton Berisha (to Rapid Wien) |
| 20 | MF | AUT | Robert Žulj (to 1899 Hoffenheim) |
| 22 | DF | GER | Johannes van den Bergh (loan return to Getafe CF) |
| 25 | MF | SLE | George Davies (to SKN St. Pölten, previously on loan at Floridsdorfer AC) |
| 28 | DF | GER | Marcel Franke (to Norwich City) |
| 33 | FW | KOS | Ilir Azemi (released) |

=== VfL Bochum ===
In:

| No. | Pos. | Nation | Player |
|---|---|---|---|
| 3 | DF | BRA | Danilo Soares (from 1899 Hoffenheim) |
| 6 | DF | GER | Luke Hemmerich (on loan from FC Schalke 04) |
| 11 | FW | GRE | Dimitrios Diamantakos (from Karlsruher SC) |
| 13 | FW | GER | Sidney Sam (from FC Schalke 04, previously on loan at Darmstadt 98) |
| 16 | FW | AUT | Lukas Hinterseer (from FC Ingolstadt) |
| 17 | FW | AUS | Robbie Kruse (free agent) |
| 23 | MF | GER | Robert Tesche (on loan from Birmingham City) |
| 37 | MF | GER | Julian Tomas (from 1899 Hoffenheim U19) |

Out:

| No. | Pos. | Nation | Player |
|---|---|---|---|
| 4 | MF | USA | Russell Canouse (loan return to 1899 Hoffenheim) |
| 6 | MF | AUT | Dominik Wydra (to Erzgebirge Aue) |
| 14 | FW | TOG | Peniel Mlapa (to Dynamo Dresden) |
| 17 | DF | POL | Paweł Dawidowicz (loan return to S.L. Benfica) |
| 23 | MF | GER | Tom Weilandt (on loan to Holstein Kiel) |
| 28 | MF | GER | Tim Krafft (to Fortuna Düsseldorf II) |
| 35 | MF | ARM | Hayk Galstyan (to VfB Stuttgart II) |
| 36 | FW | GER | Nils Quaschner (loan return to RB Leipzig) |
| 37 | DF | GER | Moise Ngwisani (to Erzgebirge Aue) |
| 39 | MF | GER | Marco Stiepermann (to Norwich City) |

=== SV Sandhausen ===
In:

| No. | Pos. | Nation | Player |
|---|---|---|---|
| 1 | GK | BIH | Goran Karačić (on loan from Adanaspor) |
| 5 | DF | GER | Marcel Seegert (from Waldhof Mannheim) |
| 8 | MF | TUN | Nejmeddin Daghfous (from Würzburger Kickers) |
| 11 | MF | KOS | Eroll Zejnullahu (on loan from Union Berlin) |
| 16 | GK | GER | Marcel Schuhen (from Hansa Rostock) |
| 18 | MF | GER | Robert Herrmann (from VfL Wolfsburg II) |
| 25 | FW | USA | Haji Wright (on loan from FC Schalke 04) |
| 26 | MF | GER | Ali Ibrahimaj (from Waldhof Mannheim) |
| 28 | MF | GER | Philipp Förster (from 1. FC Nürnberg) |
| 29 | FW | TUR | Şahin Aygüneş (from Tuzlaspor) |
| 36 | DF | GER | Ken Gipson (from RB Leipzig) |
| 38 | FW | GER | Mirco Born (from SV Meppen) |

Out:

| No. | Pos. | Nation | Player |
|---|---|---|---|
| 1 | GK | AUT | Marco Knaller (to FC Ingolstadt) |
| 5 | DF | JAM | Daniel Gordon (to Karlsruher SC) |
| 11 | MF | GER | Moritz Kuhn (to Wehen Wiesbaden) |
| 17 | MF | GER | Erik Zenga (on loan to Hallescher FC) |

=== Fortuna Düsseldorf ===
In:

| No. | Pos. | Nation | Player |
|---|---|---|---|
| 6 | MF | GER | Florian Neuhaus (on loan from Borussia Mönchengladbach) |
| 9 | FW | BEL | Benito Raman (on loan from Standard Liège) |
| 16 | FW | NOR | Håvard Nielsen (from SC Freiburg) |
| 19 | FW | CRO | Davor Lovren (on loan from Dinamo Zagreb) |
| 21 | FW | SWE | Emir Kujović (from K.A.A. Gent) |
| 23 | DF | GER | Niko Gießelmann (from Greuther Fürth) |
| 30 | GK | GER | Raphael Wolf (from Werder Bremen) |
| 33 | MF | JPN | Takashi Usami (on loan from FC Augsburg) |
| 39 | DF | GER | Jean Zimmer (on loan from VfB Stuttgart) |

Out:

| No. | Pos. | Nation | Player |
|---|---|---|---|
| 9 | MF | GER | Özkan Yıldırım (to Eintracht Braunschweig) |
| 10 | FW | GER | Marlon Ritter (on loan to SC Paderborn) |
| 19 | GK | GER | Lars Unnerstall (to VVV-Venlo) |
| 20 | FW | GER | Emmanuel Iyoha (on loan to VfL Osnabrück) |
| 22 | FW | BEL | Maecky Ngombo (released) |
| 30 | MF | GER | Arianit Ferati (loan return to Hamburger SV) |
| 37 | FW | TOG | Ihlas Bebou (to Hannover 96) |
| 39 | DF | GER | Alexander Madlung (released) |

=== 1. FC Nürnberg ===
In:

| No. | Pos. | Nation | Player |
|---|---|---|---|
| 4 | DF | BRA | Ewerton (from Sporting CP) |
| 11 | FW | SVK | Adam Zreľák (from FK Jablonec) |
| 13 | MF | GER | Tobias Werner (on loan from VfB Stuttgart) |
| 17 | MF | GER | Sebastian Kerk (from SC Freiburg) |
| 20 | DF | AUT | Lukas Jäger (from Rheindorf Altach) |
| 35 | MF | GER | Alexander Fuchs (from 1860 Munich II) |

Out:

| No. | Pos. | Nation | Player |
|---|---|---|---|
| -- | FW | GER | Stefan Kutschke (to FC Ingolstadt) |
| 4 | DF | NED | Dave Bulthuis (to Gabala FK) |
| 5 | MF | GER | Philipp Förster (to SV Sandhausen) |
| 10 | MF | GER | Tobias Kempe (to Darmstadt 98) |
| 21 | MF | GER | Willi Evseev (to Hansa Rostock) |
| 24 | FW | SLO | Tim Matavž (loan return to FC Augsburg) |
| 27 | MF | MAR | Abdelhamid Sabiri (to Huddersfield Town) |

=== 1. FC Kaiserslautern ===
In:

| No. | Pos. | Nation | Player |
|---|---|---|---|
| 2 | DF | ARG | Giuliano Modica (from Dynamo Dresden) |
| 3 | DF | GER | Joel Abu Hanna (from Bayer 04 Leverkusen) |
| 6 | DF | GER | Leon Guwara (on loan from Werder Bremen) |
| 7 | FW | AUS | Brandon Borrello (from Brisbane Roar FC) |
| 8 | MF | GER | Gino Fechner (from RB Leipzig II) |
| 9 | FW | SWE | Sebastian Andersson (from IFK Norrköping) |
| 13 | FW | LTU | Lukas Spalvis (on loan from Sporting Clube de Portugal) |
| 14 | MF | DEN | Mads Albæk (from IFK Göteborg) |
| 15 | DF | GER | Benjamin Kessel (from Union Berlin) |
| 19 | DF | POR | Marcel Correia (from Eintracht Braunschweig) |
| 22 | FW | NED | Gervane Kastaneer (from ADO Den Haag) |
| 23 | MF | TUR | Barış Atik (on loan from 1899 Hoffenheim) |
| 24 | GK | GER | Marius Müller (on loan from RB Leipzig) |

Out:

| No. | Pos. | Nation | Player |
|---|---|---|---|
| 1 | GK | GER | André Weis (on loan to Jahn Regensburg) |
| 3 | DF | GER | Tim Heubach (released) |
| 9 | FW | GER | Lukas Görtler (to FC Utrecht) |
| 10 | MF | HUN | Zoltán Stieber (to D.C. United) |
| 11 | FW | CMR | Jacques Zoua (released) |
| 17 | MF | GER | Maximilian Dittgen (on loan to Wehen Wiesbaden) |
| 19 | MF | GER | Marcel Gaus (to FC Ingolstadt) |
| 22 | GK | GER | Julian Pollersbeck (to Hamburger SV) |
| 25 | DF | GER | Robin Koch (to SC Freiburg) |
| 27 | MF | GER | Sebastian Kerk (loan return to SC Freiburg) |
| 30 | FW | GER | Erik Wekesser (to TuS Koblenz) |
| 34 | DF | ALB | Naser Aliji (released) |

=== Erzgebirge Aue ===
In:

| No. | Pos. | Nation | Player |
|---|---|---|---|
| 9 | MF | GER | Arianit Ferati (on loan from Hamburger SV) |
| 11 | MF | CUW | Michaël Maria (from SG Sonnenhof Großaspach) |
| 15 | DF | GER | Dennis Kempe (from Karlsruher SC) |
| 18 | DF | GER | Nicolai Rapp (from 1899 Hoffenheim) |
| 21 | DF | GER | Malcolm Cacutalua (from Arminia Bielefeld) |
| 24 | MF | GER | John-Patrick Strauß (from RB Leipzig II) |
| 25 | MF | AUT | Dominik Wydra (from VfL Bochum) |
| 37 | DF | GER | Moise Ngwisani (from VfL Bochum) |

Out:

| No. | Pos. | Nation | Player |
|---|---|---|---|
| -- | FW | BUL | Martin Toshev (to PFC Septemvri Sofia) |
| 2 | DF | GER | Julian Riedel (to Hansa Rostock) |
| 7 | MF | GER | Simon Handle (on loan to Viktoria Köln) |
| 10 | MF | GER | Simon Skarlatidis (to Würzburger Kickers) |
| 12 | DF | GER | Marcin Sieber (to VfB Auerbach, previously on loan) |
| 22 | MF | GER | Fabio Kaufmann (released) |
| 24 | DF | GER | Steve Breitkreuz (to Eintracht Braunschweig) |
| 27 | MF | GER | Louis Samson (to Eintracht Braunschweig) |
| 31 | GK | GER | Mario Seidel (to 1. FC Magdeburg) |

=== Arminia Bielefeld ===
In:

| No. | Pos. | Nation | Player |
|---|---|---|---|
| 1 | GK | GER | Stefan Ortega (from 1860 Munich) |
| 4 | DF | GER | Nils Teixeira (from Dynamo Dresden) |
| 7 | MF | GER | Patrick Weihrauch (from Würzburger Kickers) |
| 8 | FW | SLO | Andraž Šporar (on loan from FC Basel) |
| 18 | FW | GER | Nils Quaschner (from RB Leipzig, previously on loan to VfL Bochum) |
| 27 | MF | AUT | Konstantin Kerschbaumer (on loan from Brentford) |

Out:

| No. | Pos. | Nation | Player |
|---|---|---|---|
| 1 | GK | GER | Wolfgang Hesl (to Würzburger Kickers) |
| 2 | DF | GER | Steffen Lang (released) |
| 4 | DF | GER | Malcolm Cacutalua (to Erzgebirge Aue) |
| 10 | MF | POL | Tomasz Hołota (to Pogoń Szczecin) |
| 20 | MF | GER | Manuel Junglas (to Viktoria Köln) |
| 27 | DF | GER | Sebastian Schuppan (to Würzburger Kickers) |
| 34 | GK | IRI | Daniel Davari (to MSV Duisburg) |
| 35 | MF | GER | Allan Firmino Dantas (on loan to SV Rödinghausen) |

=== MSV Duisburg ===
In:

| No. | Pos. | Nation | Player |
|---|---|---|---|
| 6 | DF | GER | Gerrit Nauber (from Sportfreunde Lotte) |
| 16 | MF | GER | Lukas Fröde (from Würzburger Kickers) |
| 20 | MF | BRA | Cauly (from Fortuna Köln) |
| 24 | FW | UKR | Borys Tashchy (from VfB Stuttgart, previously on loan to FC Zbrojovka Brno) |
| 28 | GK | IRI | Daniel Davari (from Arminia Bielefeld) |
| 33 | MF | GER | Moritz Stoppelkamp (from Karlsruher SC) |

Out:

| No. | Pos. | Nation | Player |
|---|---|---|---|
| 6 | MF | GER | Martin Dausch (to 1. FC Saarbrücken) |
| 16 | DF | GER | Fabio Leutenecker (to Chemnitzer FC) |

=== Holstein Kiel ===
In:

| No. | Pos. | Nation | Player |
|---|---|---|---|
| 6 | DF | GER | David Kinsombi (from Karlsruher SC) |
| 7 | DF | GER | Sebastian Heidinger (from SC Paderborn) |
| 9 | MF | GER | Tom Weilandt (on loan from VfL Bochum) |
| 14 | FW | GER | Aaron Seydel (on loan from Mainz 05) |
| 15 | DF | GER | Johannes van den Bergh (from Getafe CF, previously on loan at Greuther Fürth) |
| 22 | MF | GER | Atakan Karazor (from Borussia Dortmund II) |
| 29 | MF | GER | Amara Condé (on loan from VfL Wolfsburg) |
| 34 | GK | GER | Lukas Kruse (from SC Paderborn) |

Out:

| No. | Pos. | Nation | Player |
|---|---|---|---|
| -- | FW | GER | René Guder (to ETSV Weiche, previously on loan) |
| 9 | FW | GER | Mathias Fetsch (to Hallescher FC) |
| 15 | FW | GER | Tammo Harder (released) |

=== Jahn Regensburg ===
In:

| No. | Pos. | Nation | Player |
|---|---|---|---|
| 4 | DF | DEN | Asger Sørensen (on loan from Red Bull Salzburg) |
| 5 | DF | GER | Benedikt Gimber (on loan from 1899 Hoffenheim) |
| 11 | FW | GER | Sebastian Freis (from Greuther Fürth) |
| 20 | MF | KOS | Albion Vrenezi (from FC Augsburg II) |
| 21 | FW | GER | Jonas Nietfeld (from FSV Zwickau) |
| 22 | MF | GER | Sebastian Stolze (on loan from VfL Wolfsburg II) |
| 23 | FW | ARM | Sargis Adamyan (from TSV Steinbach) |
| 29 | FW | GER | Joshua Mees (on loan from 1899 Hoffenheim II) |
| 33 | GK | GER | André Weis (on loan from 1. FC Kaiserslautern) |

Out:

| No. | Pos. | Nation | Player |
|---|---|---|---|
| 5 | DF | TUR | Ali Odabas (on loan to FSV Zwickau) |
| 11 | FW | GER | Markus Ziereis (to 1860 Munich) |
| 20 | MF | GER | Kolja Pusch (to 1. FC Heidenheim) |
| 21 | MF | AUT | Daniel Schöpf (released) |
| 24 | MF | GER | André Luge (released) |
| 33 | DF | GER | Robin Urban (released) |
| 34 | FW | GER | Haris Hyseni (on loan to SV Meppen) |

== See also ==
- 2017–18 Bundesliga
- 2017–18 2. Bundesliga
