= Marcin Sieber =

German footballer

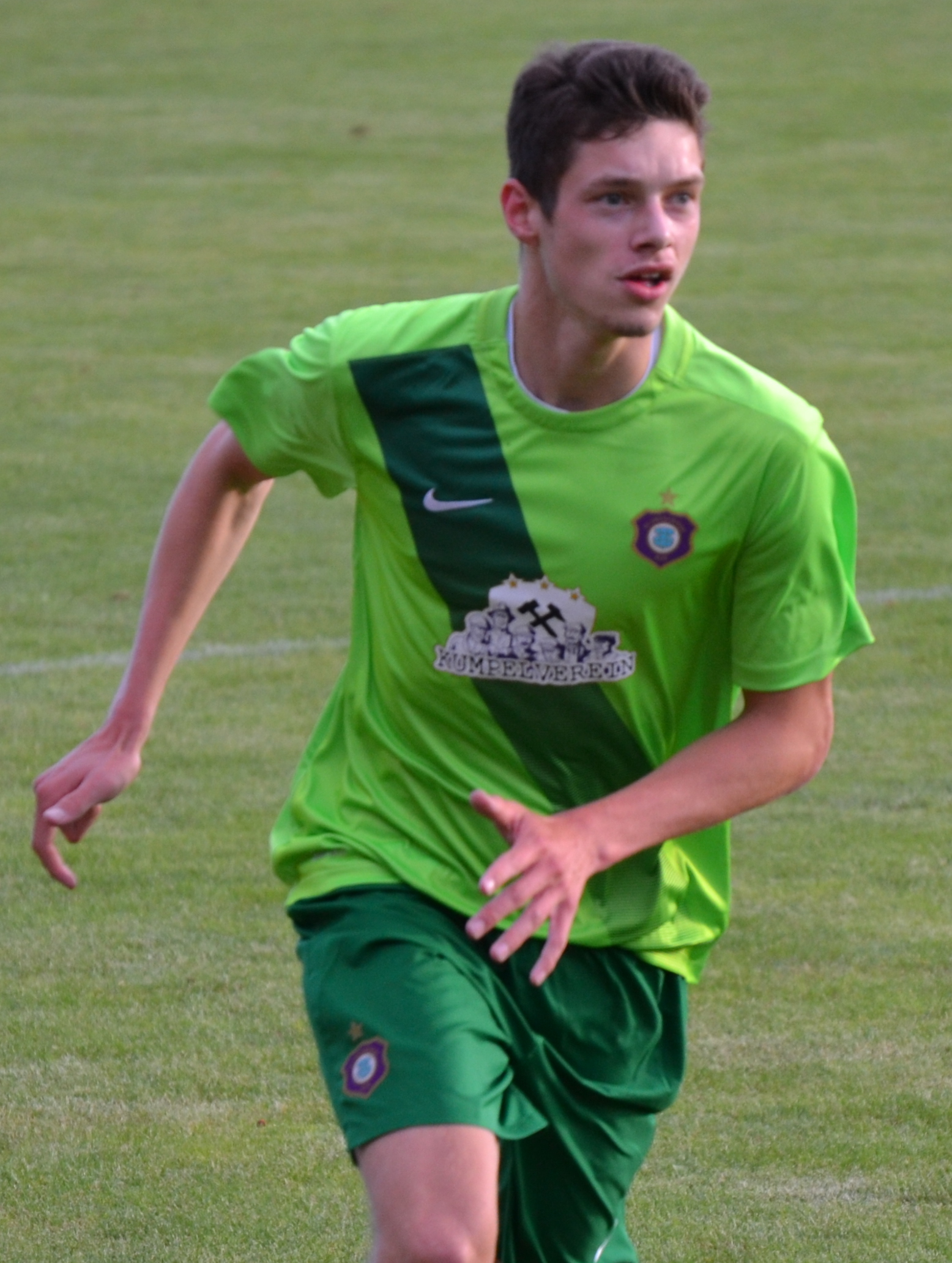

Personal information
- Full name: Marcin Sieber
- Date of birth: 31 January 1996 (age 30)
- Place of birth: Lichtenstein, Germany
- Height: 1.91 m (6 ft 3 in)
- Position: Defender

Team information
- Current team: VfB Auerbach
- Number: 26

Youth career
- 2002–2005: SV 1861 Ortmannsdorf
- 2005–2008: SG Motor Thurm
- 2008–2014: FC Erzgebirge Aue

Senior career*
Years	Team	Apps	(Gls)
2014–2017	FC Erzgebirge Aue	3	(0)
2017	→ VfB Auerbach (loan)	15	(0)
2017–	VfB Auerbach	96	(4)
- * Club domestic league appearances and goals as of 11:17, 22 December 2020 (UTC)

Marcin Sieber (born 31 January 1996 in Lichtenstein) is a German footballer who plays as a defender for VfB Auerbach. Sieber is of Polish descent.
