= Patrik Džalto =

German footballer (born 1997)

Personal information
- Date of birth: 19 February 1997 (age 29)
- Place of birth: Reutlingen, Germany
- Height: 1.75 m (5 ft 9 in)
- Position: Forward

Youth career
- VfL Pfullingen
- VfB Stuttgart
- SSV Reutlingen
- –2013: 1. FC Kaiserslautern
- 2013–2015: RB Leipzig
- 2015–2016: Bayer Leverkusen

Senior career*
Years	Team	Apps	(Gls)
2015–2017	Bayer Leverkusen	0	(0)
2016–2017	→ Jahn Regensburg (loan)	6	(0)
2017–2018	Jahn Regensburg	0	(0)
2018	TuS Koblenz	10	(0)
2018	FC Memmingen	17	(5)
2019	Austria Klagenfurt	7	(0)
2020–2022	Vukovar '91		
2022–2023	Bregalnica Štip	2	(0)

International career
2014	Croatia U19	3	(1)
- * Club domestic league appearances and goals as of 03:42, 4 July 2024 (UTC)

Patrik Džalto (born 19 February 1997) is a Croatian footballer who most recently played as a forward for Bregalnica Štip.

== Club career ==
In summer 2016, Džalto joined Jahn Regensburg on loan from Bayer Leverkusen for the 2016–17 season. In June 2017, he signed permanently, agreeing to a one-year contract. In January 2018, he joined TuS Koblenz.

In the beginning of 2020, Džalto joined Croatian club HNK Vukovar '91.
