= Kolja Pusch =

German footballer (born 1993)

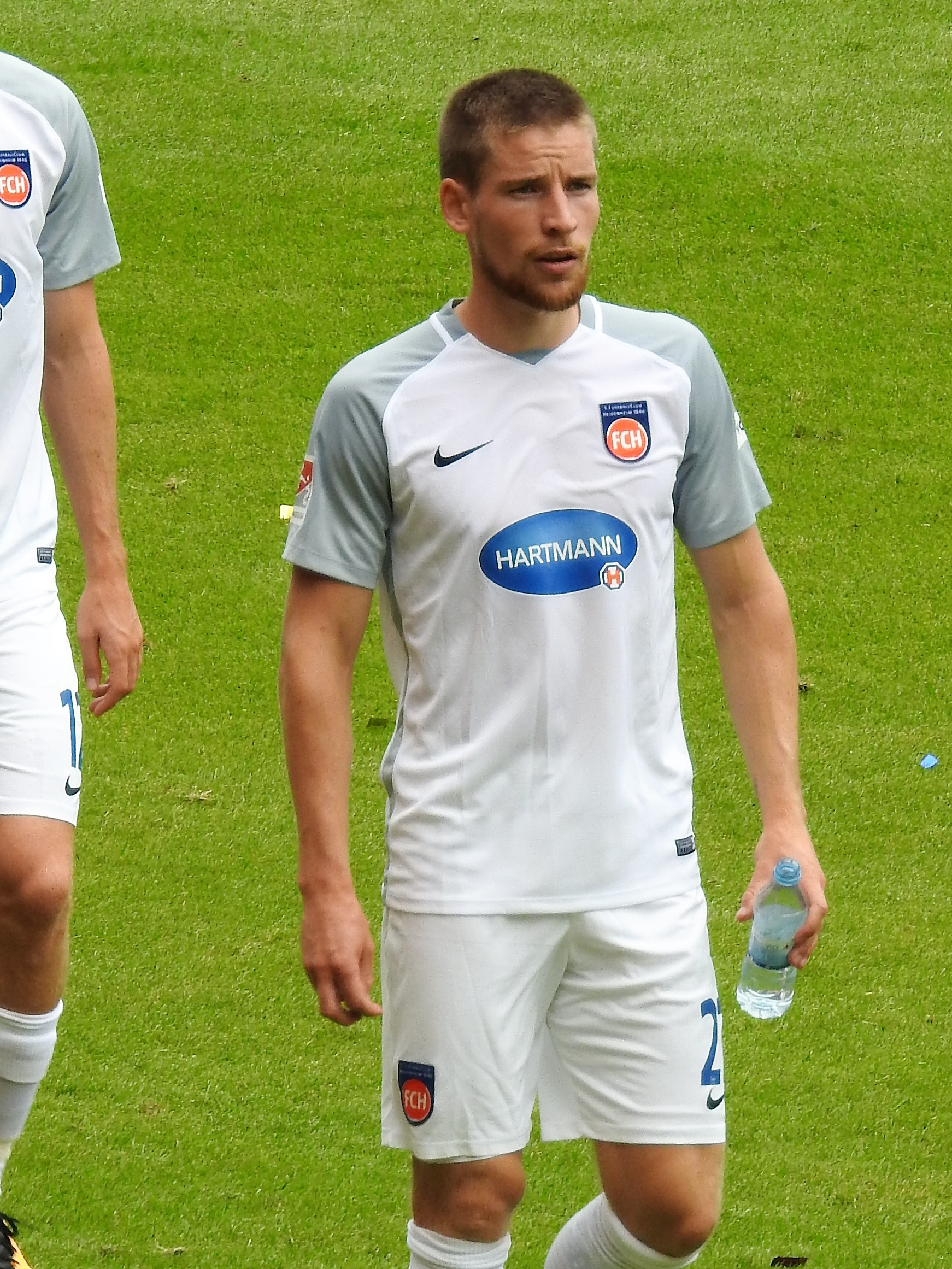
- Pusch with 1. FC Heidenheim in 2017

Personal information
- Date of birth: 12 February 1993 (age 33)
- Place of birth: Wuppertal, Germany
- Height: 1.81 m (5 ft 11 in)
- Position: Midfielder

Team information
- Current team: TSV Meerbusch

Youth career
- –2003: TSV 05 Ronsdorf
- 2003–2005: Grün-Weiß Wuppertal
- 2005–2012: Bayer Leverkusen

Senior career*
Years	Team	Apps	(Gls)
2011–2013	Bayer Leverkusen II	19	(2)
2012–2013	Bayer Leverkusen	0	(0)
2013–2015	Chemnitzer FC	22	(2)
2013–2015	Chemnitzer FC II	5	(2)
2015–2017	Jahn Regensburg	76	(15)
2015–2017	Jahn Regensburg II	1	(0)
2017–2019	1. FC Heidenheim	24	(1)
2019	→ Admira Wacker (loan)	11	(2)
2019–2020	Admira Wacker	17	(3)
2020–2021	KFC Uerdingen	34	(2)
2021–2024	MSV Duisburg	83	(10)
2024–	TSV Meerbusch	0	(0)

International career
2008	Germany U-16	8	(2)
2009–2010	Germany U-17	11	(4)
- * Club domestic league appearances and goals as of 15:11, 19 May 2024 (UTC)

Kolja Pusch (born 12 February 1993) is a German professional footballer who plays as a midfielder for TSV Meerbusch.

== Career ==
Having come through the Bayer 04 Leverkusen youth ranks, Pusch played for the club's reserves and Chemnitzer FC before joining SSV Jahn Regensburg. In the 2016–17 season, he achieved promotion to the 2. Bundesliga with the club, contributing 31 appearances in which scored six goals and made seven assists.

In June 2016, Pusch chose not to extend his contract but to leave the club and sign a contract until 2020 with 1. FC Heidenheim.

On 2 September 2019, Admira Wacker announced the signing of Pusch.

After moving to KFC Uerdingen for the 2020–21 season, he joined MSV Duisburg the year after. In June 2023, he extended his contract for another season. After the 2023–24 season, he moved to TSV Meerbusch of the Oberliga Niederrhein.

== Career statistics ==
As of 19 May 2024

Appearances and goals by club, season and competition
Club	Season	Division	League		Cup		Other		Total	
Club	Season	Division	Apps	Goals	Apps	Goals	Apps	Goals	Apps	Goals
Bayer Leverkusen II	2011–12	Regionalliga West	2	0	—		—		2	0
Bayer Leverkusen II	2012–13	Regionalliga West	17	2	—		—		17	2
Bayer Leverkusen II	Total		19	2	—		—		19	2
Chemnitzer FC	2013–14	3. Liga	22	2	—		—		22	2
Chemnitzer FC II	2013–14	NOFV-Oberliga Süd	5	0	—		—		5	0
Jahn Regensburg	2014–15	3. Liga	16	3	—		—		16	3
Jahn Regensburg	2015–16	Regionalliga Bayern	29	6	—		2 (Note: Appearance(s) in promotion playoff)	1	31	7
Jahn Regensburg	2016–17	3. Liga	31	6	1	0	2	1	34	7
Jahn Regensburg	Total		76	15	1	0	4	2	81	17
Jahn Regensburg II	2016–17	Bayernliga	1	0	—		—		1	0
1. FC Heidenheim	2017–18	2. Bundesliga	18	1	2	2	—		20	3
1. FC Heidenheim	2018–19	2. Bundesliga	5	0	2	2	—		7	2
1. FC Heidenheim	2019–20	2. Bundesliga	1	0	—		—		1	0
1. FC Heidenheim	Total		24	1	4	4	—		28	5
Admira Wacker	2018–19	Austrian Bundesliga	11	2	—		—		11	2
Admira Wacker	2019–20	Austrian Bundesliga	17	3	1	0	—		18	3
Admira Wacker	Total		28	5	1	0	—		29	5
KFC Uerdingen	2020–21	3. Liga	34	2	—		—		34	2
MSV Duisburg	2021–22	3. Liga	31	4	—		—		31	4
MSV Duisburg	2022–23	3. Liga	32	5	—		—		32	5
MSV Duisburg	2023–24	3. Liga	20	1	—		—		20	1
MSV Duisburg	Total		83	10	0	0	—		83	10
Career total			292	37	6	4	4	2	302	43
