= Michael Faber (footballer, born 1995) =

German footballer

Personal information
- Full name: Michael Faber
- Date of birth: 12 May 1995 (age 31)
- Place of birth: Germany
- Height: 1.80 m (5 ft 11 in)
- Position: Midfielder

Team information
- Current team: SpVgg Osterhofen
- Number: 20

Youth career
- SpVgg Grün-Weiss Deggendorf
- –2013: SpVgg Plattling

Senior career*
Years	Team	Apps	(Gls)
2013	SpVgg Plattling	4	(0)
2013–2015	1. FC Bad Kötzting	55	(2)
2015–	Jahn Regensburg II	34	(9)
2015–2017	Jahn Regensburg	12	(0)
2017–2018	DJK Vilzing	29	(7)
2018–2020	1. FC Bad Kötzting	44	(15)
2020–	SpVgg Osterhofen	1	(0)
- * Club domestic league appearances and goals as of 17:53, 11 February 2021 (UTC)

Michael Faber (born 12 May 1995) is a German footballer who plays as a midfielder for SpVgg Osterhofen.

In summer 2017, he transferred from Jahn Regensburg to DJK Vilzing.
