= Robin Urban =

German footballer

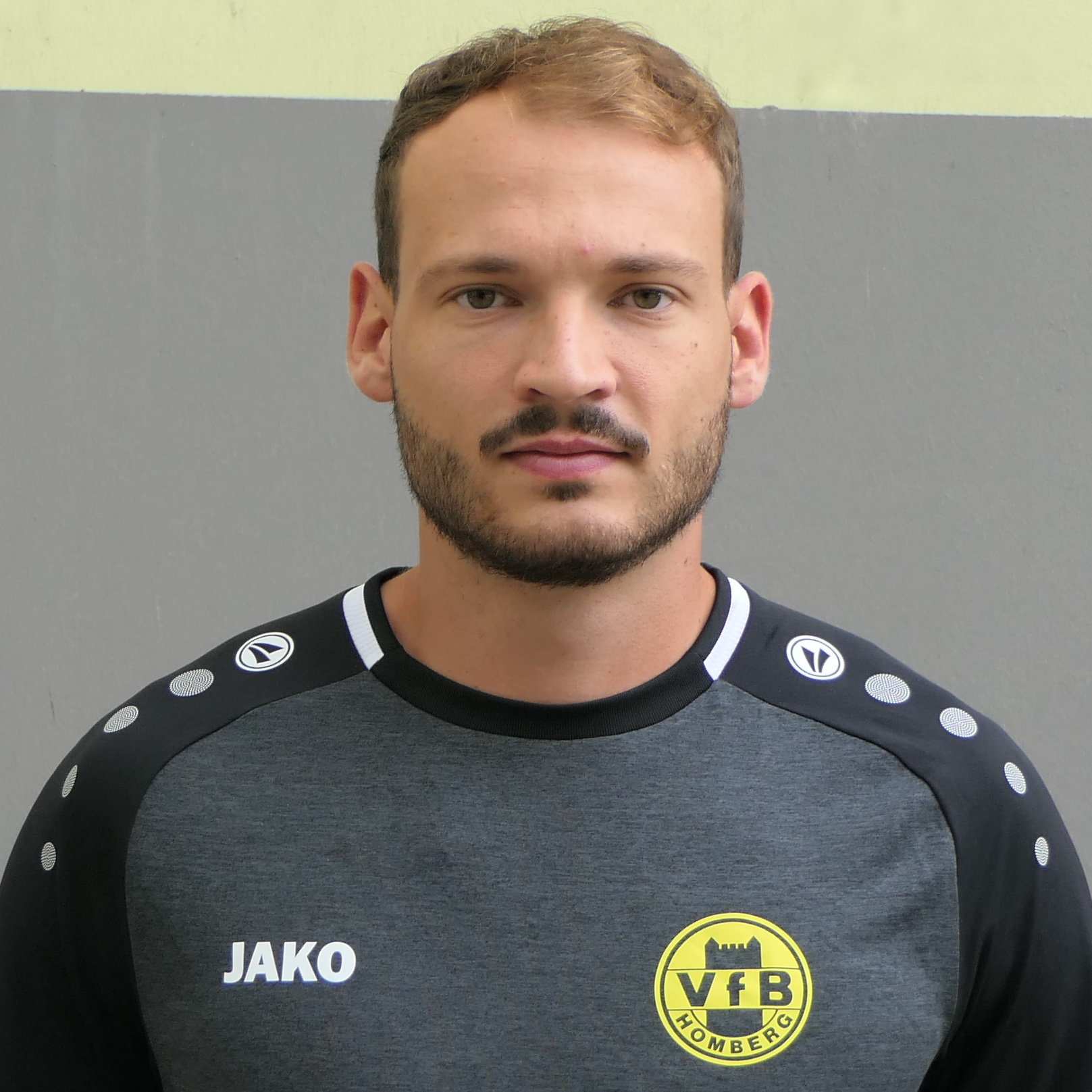
- 2019

Personal information
- Date of birth: 13 April 1994 (age 32)
- Place of birth: Herdecke, Germany
- Height: 1.89 m (6 ft 2 in)
- Position: Centre-back

Team information
- Current team: SSVg Velbert
- Number: 33

Youth career
- SV Langendreer 04
- VfL Bochum
- –2012: Wuppertaler SV
- 2012–2013: Fortuna Düsseldorf

Senior career*
Years	Team	Apps	(Gls)
2013–2015	Fortuna Düsseldorf II	60	(4)
2014–2015	Fortuna Düsseldorf	1	(0)
2015–2016	Hallescher FC	1	(0)
2016–2017	Jahn Regensburg	8	(0)
2016–2017	Jahn Regensburg II	2	(0)
2017–2019	Rot-Weiss Essen	46	(2)
2019–2020	VfB Homberg	24	(1)
2020–2021	Hessen Kassel	28	(2)
2021–	SSVg Velbert	66	(9)
- * Club domestic league appearances and goals as of 22 August 2023

Robin Urban (born 13 April 1994) is a German footballer who plays as a centre-back for SSVg Velbert.
