= Daniel Schöpf =

Austrian footballer

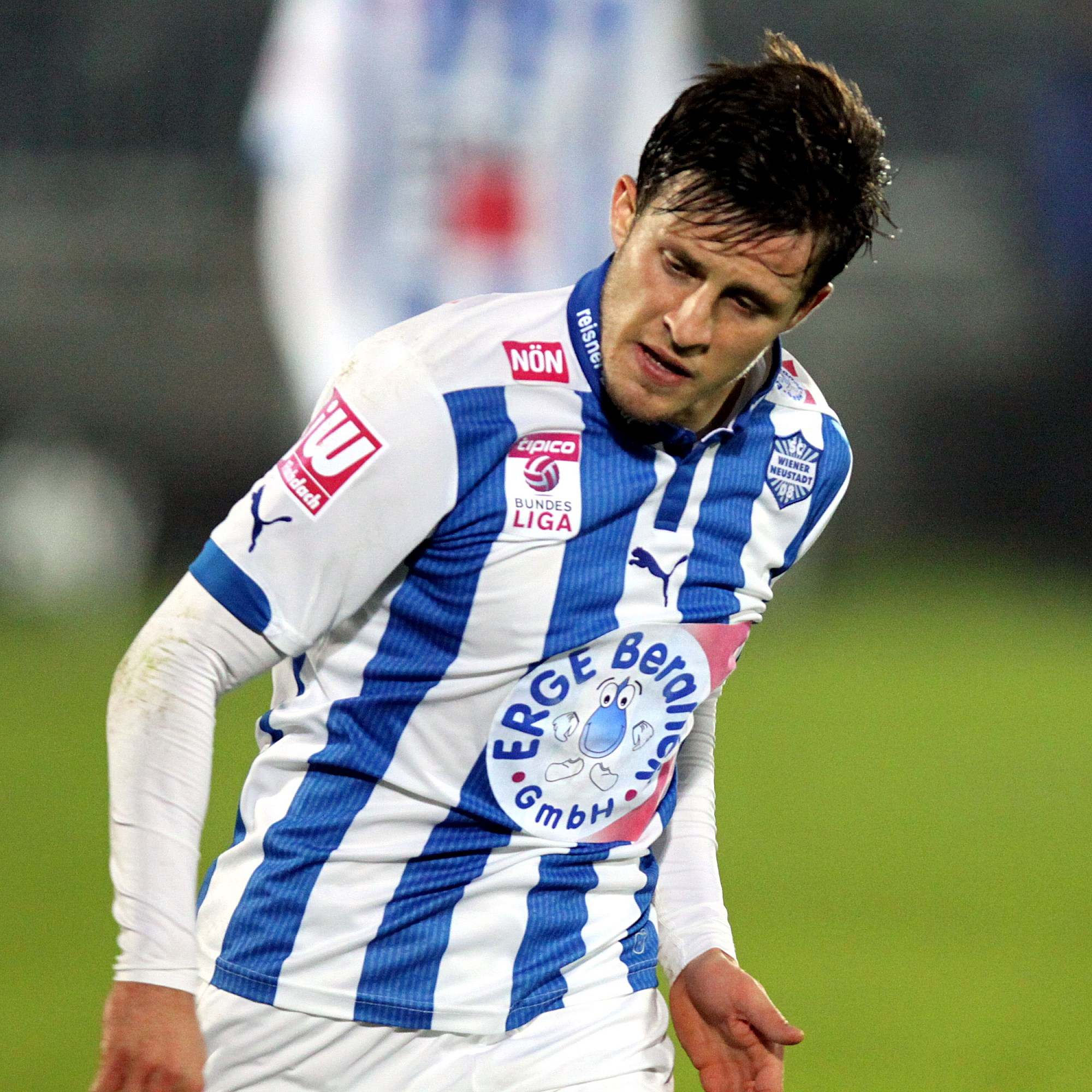

Personal information
- Date of birth: 9 January 1990 (age 36)
- Place of birth: Vienna, Austria
- Height: 1.73 m (5 ft 8 in)
- Position: Central midfielder

Team information
- Current team: SC Wolkersdorf
- Number: 10

Senior career*
Years	Team	Apps	(Gls)
2008–2010	Austria Wien II	31	(0)
2010–2011	FC Lustenau	30	(9)
2011–2013	Altach	48	(0)
2013–2015	Wiener Neustadt	24	(3)
2015–2017	Jahn Regensburg	22	(4)
2018	SV Stripfing	5	(0)
2018–2019	FAC	15	(0)
2020–	SC Wolkersdorf	33	(10)

International career
2008	Austria Under-19	1	(0)
2011	Austria Under-21	4	(0)
- * Club domestic league appearances and goals as of 21:02, 12 March 2023 (UTC)

Daniel Schöpf (born 9 January 1990) is an Austrian footballer who last played for SSV Jahn Regensburg.

== Career ==
=== Club career ===
Schöpf began his youth career with Austria Wien, and having advanced through the club's youth system made his debut for the second team as a substitute in a 2–1 win against FC Lustenau in Regional League East on 1 August 2008. He subsequently joined FC Lustenau in 2010, and he left to join Altach a year later. He spent two years in the First League with Altach before joining Wiener Neustadt in the summer of 2013. In summer 2015, he transferred to SSV Jahn Regensburg. His contract with Regensburg ended in 2017.

Schöpf has represented Austria at both under-19 and under-21 level.

Ahead of the 2018–19 season, Schöpf joined Floridsdorfer AC. He left the club at the end of the season. In summer 2020, Schöpf moved to SC Wolkersdorf.
