= Uwe Hesse =

German footballer

Personal information
- Date of birth: 16 December 1987 (age 38)
- Place of birth: Rüsselsheim, West Germany
- Height: 1.80 m (5 ft 11 in)
- Position: Midfielder

Team information
- Current team: KSG Georgenhausen

Youth career
- SG Astheim
- –2009: SG Dornheim

Senior career*
| Years | Team | Apps | (Gls) |
| 2009–2014 | SV Darmstadt 98 | 134 | (16) |
| 2014–2018 | Jahn Regensburg | 86 | (7) |
| 2018–2019 | Hessen Dreieich | 24 | (2) |
| 2019–2020 | VfB Ginsheim | 15 | (1) |
| 2020– | KSG Georgenhausen | 8 | (1) |

Managerial career
- 2020–: KSG Georgenhausen
- * Club domestic league appearances and goals as of 12:34, 30 January 2021 (UTC)

Uwe Hesse (born 16 December 1987) is a German footballer who plays for KSG Georgenhausen.
