= André Luge =

German footballer

Personal information
- Full name: André Luge
- Date of birth: 8 February 1991 (age 35)
- Place of birth: Chemnitz, Germany
- Height: 1.77 m (5 ft 10 in)
- Position: Winger

Team information
- Current team: DJK Vilzing
- Number: 44

Youth career
- 1999–2001: Altchemnitzer BSC
- 2001–2007: Chemnitzer FC
- 2007–2009: Werder Bremen

Senior career*
Years	Team	Apps	(Gls)
2009–2011	Carl Zeiss Jena II	22	(1)
2010–2011	Carl Zeiss Jena	9	(0)
2011–2013	FSV Zwickau	55	(21)
2013–2015	RB Leipzig	6	(1)
2014	→ SV Elversberg (loan)	3	(0)
2015	→ FSV Zwickau (loan)	14	(2)
2015–2017	Jahn Regensburg	31	(1)
2017–	DJK Vilzing	84	(50)
- * Club domestic league appearances and goals as of 17:05, 25 January 2021 (UTC)

André Luge (born 8 February 1991) is a German footballer who plays as a winger for DJK Vilzing.

== Career ==
Born in Chemnitz, Luge made his professional debut in the German 3. Liga for Carl Zeiss Jena against FC Bayern Munich II on 21 August 2010, as a substitute for Torsten Ziegner.

In June 2013, he signed for 3. Liga side RB Leipzig. He played his debut match in a 3–2 win against 1. FC Saarbrücken on 30 November 2013. He joined SV Elversberg on loan in July 2014.

In 2015 he transferred to SSV Jahn Regensburg. As his contract was not extended and he wanted not to move too far away from Regensburg, he joined DJK Vilzing on a free transfer in summer 2017.
