= Andreas Geipl =

German footballer

Personal information
- Date of birth: 21 April 1992 (age 34)
- Place of birth: Garmisch-Partenkirchen, Germany
- Height: 1.80 m (5 ft 11 in)
- Position: Midfielder

Team information
- Current team: Chemnitzer FC
- Number: 6

Youth career
- –2003: SC Bad Kohlgrub
- 2003–2011: 1860 Munich

Senior career*
Years	Team	Apps	(Gls)
2011–2014	1860 Munich II	67	(7)
2014–2020	Jahn Regensburg	145	(9)
2015–2020	→ Jahn Regensburg II	2	(0)
2020–2023	1. FC Heidenheim	53	(0)
2023–2026	Jahn Regensburg	70	(1)
2026–	Chemnitzer FC	10	(0)
- * Club domestic league appearances and goals as of 23 September 2026

Andreas Geipl (born 21 April 1992) is a German professional footballer who plays for Chemnitzer FC.

== Career ==
Geipl played for the youth teams of SC Bad Kohlgrub and TSV 1860 Munich. He made his professional debut for SSV Jahn Regensburg on 26 July 2014 in a 3. Liga match against MSV Duisburg, where Regensburg won 3–1. On 1 June 2016, Geipl extended his contract with Regensburg until 2017.

In summer 2020, he joined 1. FC Heidenheim on a free transfer.
