= Jann George =

German footballer (born 1992)

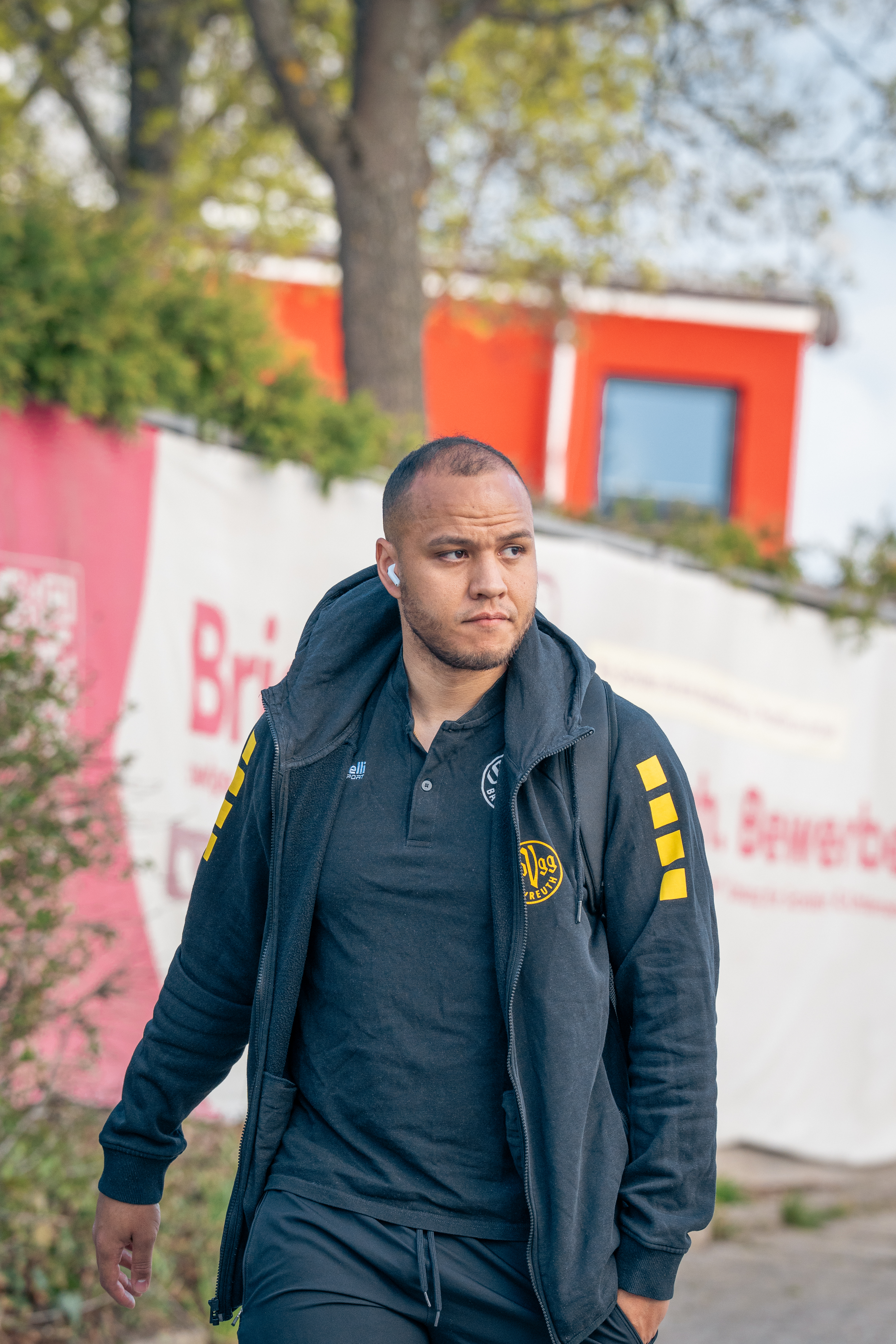
- Jann George in 2026.

Personal information
- Full name: Jann-Christopher George
- Date of birth: 31 July 1992 (age 34)
- Place of birth: Nuremberg, Germany
- Height: 1.77 m (5 ft 10 in)
- Position: Forward

Team information
- Current team: SpVgg Bayreuth
- Number: 10

Youth career
- 1998–2002: SG Nürnberg-Fürth
- 2002–2010: 1. FC Nürnberg

Senior career*
Years	Team	Apps	(Gls)
2010–2012	1. FC Nürnberg II	37	(11)
2012–2013	1860 Munich	0	(0)
2013–2015	Greuther Fürth	1	(0)
2013–2015	Greuther Fürth II	43	(23)
2015–2022	Jahn Regensburg	180	(35)
2022	Erzgebirge Aue	7	(0)
2022–	SpVgg Bayreuth	79	(16)
- * Club domestic league appearances and goals as of 28 June 2026

Jann-Christopher George (born 31 July 1992) is a German professional footballer who plays as a forward for club SpVgg Bayreuth.

== Club career ==
George joined the 1. FC Nürnberg system at the age of nine and stayed with them until making his way to the U-23 team. After a conflict with Nürnberg's coaching staff, he left the club in the fall of 2012 and joined SpVgg Greuther Fürth in the summer of 2013. He made his first team debut in October 2014.

In summer 2015, he joined Jahn Regensburg.

After six years he transferred to Erzgebirge Aue in January 2022.

On 31 August 2022, George signed with newly promoted 3. Liga club SpVgg Bayreuth.

== International career ==
The son of an African American serviceman and a German mother, George is eligible for both Germany and the United States. He has expressed an interest in representing the United States, and has been called up to the United States under-23 side.
