= Marc Lais =

German footballer

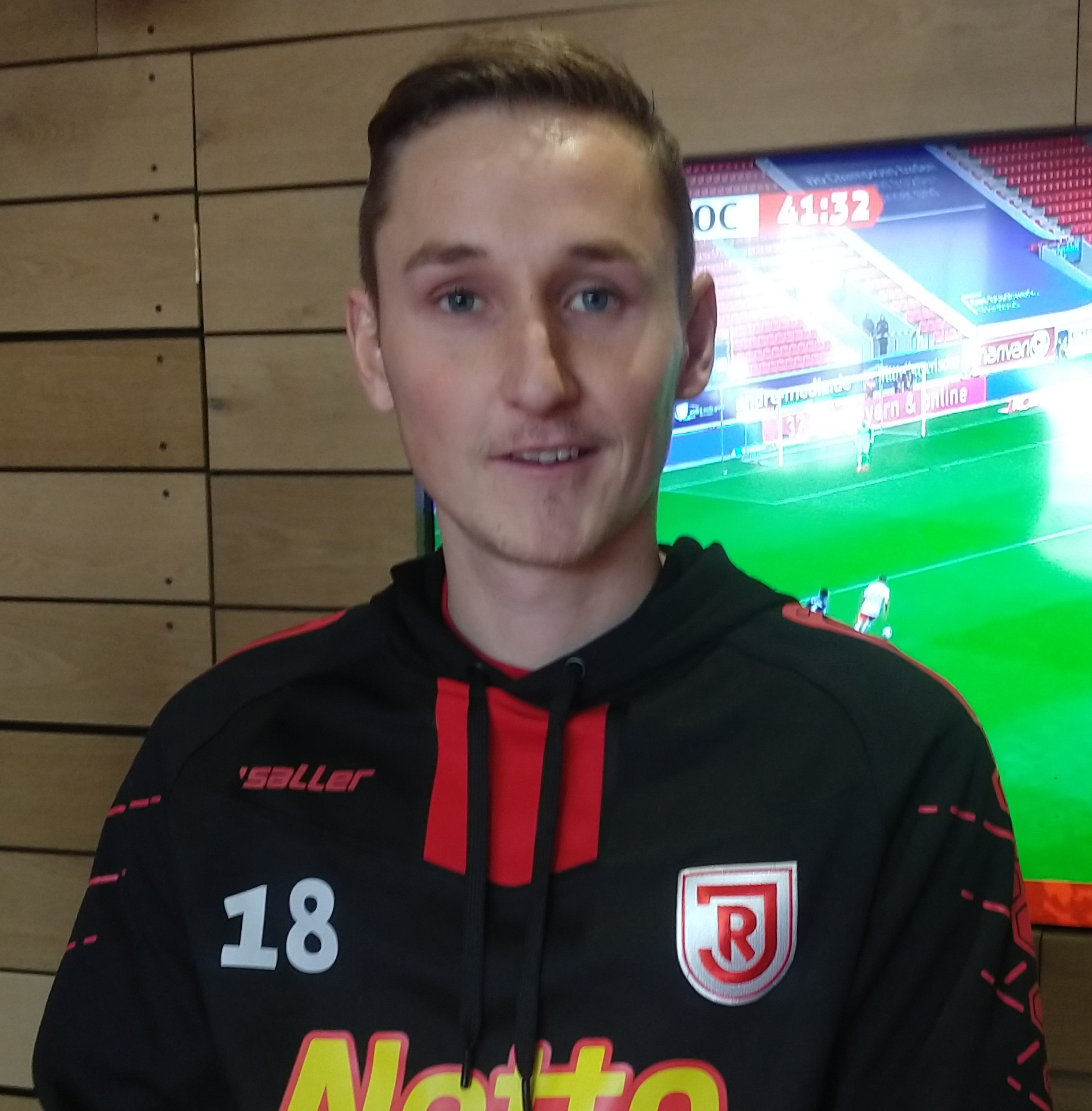
- Lais in 2019

Personal information
- Date of birth: 4 February 1991 (age 35)
- Place of birth: Freiburg im Breisgau, Germany
- Height: 1.84 m (6 ft 0 in)
- Position: Midfielder

Youth career
- –2002: SV Au-Wittnau
- 2002–2009: SC Freiburg

Senior career*
Years	Team	Apps	(Gls)
2009–2013	SC Freiburg II	93	(11)
2011–2014	SC Freiburg	1	(0)
2013–2014	→ SV Sandhausen (loan)	0	(0)
2014	→ Chemnitzer FC (loan)	16	(0)
2014–2015	Chemnitzer FC II	7	(0)
2014–2015	Chemnitzer FC	17	(0)
2015–2020	Jahn Regensburg	113	(14)
2020–2022	SV Wehen Wiesbaden	28	(0)
- * Club domestic league appearances and goals

Marc Lais (born 4 February 1991) is a German former professional footballer who played as a midfielder.
