= Kevin Hoffmann =

German footballer (born 1995)

Personal information
- Date of birth: 6 June 1995 (age 31)
- Place of birth: Regensburg, Germany
- Height: 1.82 m (6 ft 0 in)
- Position: Forward

Team information
- Current team: SV Fortuna Regensburg
- Number: 10

Youth career
- 2002–2006: FC Mintraching
- 2006–2011: Jahn Regensburg
- 2011–2014: Greuther Fürth

Senior career*
Years	Team	Apps	(Gls)
2014–2015	Greuther Fürth II	14	(2)
2015–2020	Jahn Regensburg II	35	(7)
2015–2020	Jahn Regensburg	12	(0)
2018–2019	→ FSV Zwickau (loan)	20	(2)
2019–2020	→ VfR Aalen (loan)	17	(4)
2020–2021	VfR Aalen	30	(3)
2021–2024	SV Donaustauf	76	(23)
2024–	SV Fortuna Regensburg	29	(7)

Managerial career
- 2023–2024: SV Donaustauf (caretaker)
- * Club domestic league appearances and goals as of 20:46, 11 January 2026 (UTC)

Kevin Hoffmann (born 6 June 1995) is a German professional footballer who plays as a forward for Bayernliga club SV Fortuna Regensburg.

For the 2018–19 season, he was loaned out to FSV Zwickau. The season after, he was loaned out again, this time to VfR Aalen.

After another season in Aalen, VfR Aalen left the club in the summer of 2021 and joined Bayernliga club SV Donaustauf. From August 2023, he served as player-manager there, but resigned from his coaching position in January 2024. In the summer of 2024, he joined league rivals SV Fortuna Regensburg.
