= Sven Kopp =

German footballer

Personal information
- Date of birth: 17 February 1995 (age 31)
- Place of birth: Weiden i.d.Opf., Germany
- Height: 1.98 m (6 ft 6 in)
- Positions: Defensive midfielder; centre-back

Team information
- Current team: FC Tremmersdorf (player-assistant)
- Number: 13

Youth career
- 2007–2014: SpVgg Weiden

Senior career*
Years	Team	Apps	(Gls)
2012–2014	SpVgg Weiden	67	(10)
2014–2019	Jahn Regensburg II	49	(5)
2014–2019	Jahn Regensburg	23	(1)
2019–2020	SpVgg Bayreuth	15	(1)
2020–2024	SpVgg Weiden	51	(1)
2025–	FC Tremmersdorf	0	(0)

Managerial career
- 2025–: FC Tremmersdorf (assistant)
- * Club domestic league appearances and goals as of 22:10, 30 December 2024 (UTC)

Sven Kopp (born 17 February 1995) is a German footballer who plays as a defensive midfielder or centre-back for FC Tremmersdorf.

== Career ==
=== Club career ===
Kopp joined SpVgg Weiden at U13 level and played for the first team in the Landesliga at the age of 17 in the 2012–13 season. He was also a regular starter in the Bayernliga the following season and scored a total of ten goals in 67 games for Weiden, helping the team with promotion to the 2013–14 Bayernliga.

After a good season for Weiden, with four goals in 34 games, Kopp was signed by 3. Liga club SSV Jahn Regensburg in the summer of 2014. Jahn's sporting director Christian Keller called Kopp the “greatest talent in eastern Bavaria”. Kopp made a total of four appearances in the 3. Liga and Regensburg were relegated to the Regionalliga at the end of the season. In the 2015–16 season, Regensburg were promoted back to the 3. Liga as champions of the Regionalliga Bayern. At the end of the 2016–17 season, they were promoted to the 2. Bundesliga. From then on, however, Kopp only played for Jahn's reserve team in the Bayernliga.

In January 2019, Kopp moved to SpVgg Bayreuth in the Regionalliga Bayern. Here, he played for two seasons before leaving and re-joining in summer 2020 his childhood club, SpVgg Weiden. In April 2023, Kopp was seriously injured, and was out on the sideline for the whole 2023–24 season with a torn cruciate ligament and torn meniscus injury.

=== Coaching career ===
After much doubt whether Kopp would continue his football career after over a year and a half without football due to his serious knee injury, it was confirmed in December 2024 that he moved to FC Tremmersdorf as a playing assistant coach.
