= Ali Odabas =

German-Turkish footballer

Personal information
- Date of birth: 20 October 1993 (age 33)
- Place of birth: Schwäbisch Gmünd, Germany
- Height: 1.87 m (6 ft 2 in)
- Position: Centre-back

Team information
- Current team: VfR Aalen
- Number: 17

Youth career
- –2012: VfR Aalen

Senior career*
Years	Team	Apps	(Gls)
2012–2015	VfR Aalen II	32	(4)
2015	Jahn Regensburg II	3	(0)
2015–2019	Jahn Regensburg	29	(1)
2017–2018	→ FSV Zwickau (loan)	2	(0)
2019–2021	FSV Zwickau	28	(0)
2021–	VfR Aalen	155	(3)
- * Club domestic league appearances and goals as of 24 September 2026

Ali Odabas (born 20 October 1993) is a German-Turkish professional footballer who plays as a centre-back for VfR Aalen.

== Club career ==
In July 2015, Odabas moved to Jahn Regensburg on a free transfer. He made his competitive debut for the club on 16 July 2015 in a 3–2 home victory over Viktoria Aschaffenburg. In July 2016, Odabas tore the cruciate ligament in his right knee in a friendly with FC Sopron. In June 2017, he extended his contract with Regensburg until 30 June 2019 and was loaned out for one season to FSV Zwickau. He only made two league appearances during his time at Zwickau, one in a 1–1 draw with Sportfreunde Lotte on 29 July 2017 and the other in a 1–0 defeat to Würzburg on 27 August 2017.
