= Haris Hyseni =

German-Kosovar footballer

Personal information
- Date of birth: 14 September 1992 (age 34)
- Place of birth: Mitrovica, Yugoslavia
- Height: 1.92 m (6 ft 4 in)
- Position: Forward

Team information
- Current team: SSV Jeddeloh
- Number: 37

Youth career
- SC Cismar
- TSV Neustadt in Holstein
- –2010: Eutin 08

Senior career*
Years	Team	Apps	(Gls)
2011–2012	NTSV Strand 08		
2012	VfR Neumünster	2	(0)
2013	VfB Lübeck	1	(0)
2013–2014	SV Eichede	34	(14)
2014–2015	Eintracht Braunschweig II	40	(14)
2015	Eintracht Braunschweig	1	(0)
2016–2019	Jahn Regensburg	45	(6)
2017–2018	→ SV Meppen (loan)	17	(0)
2019–2020	SSV Ulm	15	(2)
2020–2024	Phönix Lübeck	84	(35)
2024–2026	SV Drochtersen/Assel	62	(24)
2026–	SSV Jeddeloh	5	(1)
- * Club domestic league appearances and goals as of 22 September 2026

Haris Hyseni (born 14 September 1992) is a German-Kosovar footballer who plays as a forward for SSV Jeddeloh.

== Club career ==
Hyseni joined the reserve side of Eintracht Braunschweig in the Regionalliga Nord in 2014 from SV Eichede. On the 29th matchday of the 2014–15 2. Bundesliga season, he made his professional debut for Eintracht's senior side, coming on in the 59th minute in a match against VfR Aalen.

During the winter break of the 2015–16 season, Hyseni transferred to SSV Jahn Regensburg. On 28 June 2017, he extended his contract with Regensburg and was loaned out to SV Meppen until the end of the 2017–18 season. In summer 2019, he joined SSV Ulm 1846.
