= 2019–20 Dynamo Dresden season =

Dynamo Dresden
2019–20 season
- Chairman: Holger Scholze
- Manager: Cristian Fiél
- Stadium: Rudolf-Harbig-Stadion
- 2. Bundesliga: 18th (relegated)
- DFB-Pokal: Second round
- Top goalscorer: League: Moussa Koné (6); Patrick Schmidt (6); All: Moussa Koné (7)
- Highest home attendance: 30,573 vs Erzgebirge Aue, 2. Bundesliga, 8 March 2020
- Lowest home attendance: 24,811 vs Holstein Kiel, 2. Bundesliga, 30 November 2019
- Average home league attendance: 27,218 (Note: Only matches with spectators present are included in the average.)
- Biggest win: 3–0 vs TuS Dassendorf, DFB-Pokal, 10 August 2019
- Biggest defeat: 4–0 vs Arminia Bielefeld, 2. Bundesliga, 15 June 2020
Home colours	Away colours	Third colours

The 2019–20 Dynamo Dresden season is the 70th season in the football club's history and 4th consecutive season in the second division of German football, the 2. Bundesliga and 9th overall.

== Season summary ==
Dynamo Dresden competed in the 2. Bundesliga, having finished 12th during the previous season. On 2 December 2019, following a 2–1 defeat to Holstein Kiel, the club parted company with manager Cristian Fiél. On 10 December 2019, Markus Kauczinski was appointed as his successor. The club finished bottom on 32 points, and were relegated to the 3. Liga.

== Squad ==
As of 28 June 2020

=== First-team squad ===
Note: Flags indicate national team as defined under FIFA eligibility rules; some limited exceptions apply. Players may hold more than one non-FIFA nationality.

No.	Pos.	Nation	Player
1	GK	GER	Kevin Broll
2	DF	SWE	Linus Wahlqvist
4	MF	GRE	Jannis Nikolaou
5	MF	GER	Dženis Burnić (on loan from Borussia Dortmund)
6	MF	GER	Marco Hartmann (captain)
7	DF	GER	Niklas Kreuzer
8	MF	CZE	Josef Hušbauer (on loan from Slavia Prague)
9	FW	GER	Patrick Schmidt (on loan from 1. FC Heidenheim)
10	MF	GER	Marco Terrazzino (on loan from SC Freiburg)
11	FW	SWE	Alexander Jeremejeff
13	FW	DEN	Simon Makienok
14	MF	CZE	Ondřej Petrák (on loan from 1. FC Nürnberg)
15	DF	GER	Chris Löwe
17	MF	GER	René Klingenburg
18	DF	GER	Jannik Müller

No.	Pos.	Nation	Player
19	FW	GER	Simon Gollnack
20	MF	GER	Patrick Ebert
21	GK	GER	Tim Boss
23	DF	GER	Florian Ballas
24	GK	GER	Patrick Wiegers
25	FW	GHA	Godsway Donyoh (on loan from FC Nordsjælland)
28	MF	TUR	Barış Atik
29	MF	AUT	Sascha Horvath
31	DF	DEN	Brian Hämäläinen
34	MF	GER	Justin Löwe
35	FW	GER	Ransford-Yeboah Königsdörffer
36	MF	GER	Max Kulke
37	MF	GER	Maximilian Großer
39	DF	GER	Kevin Ehlers

=== Left club during season ===
Note: Flags indicate national team as defined under FIFA eligibility rules; some limited exceptions apply. Players may hold more than one non-FIFA nationality.

No.	Pos.	Nation	Player
8	FW	TUR	Osman Atılgan (on loan at Hansa Rostock)
9	FW	GER	Lucas Röser (signed for 1. FC Kaiserslautern in August 2019)
11	MF	BIH	Haris Duljević (signed for Nîmes Olympique in July 2019)
14	FW	SEN	Moussa Koné (signed for Nîmes Olympique in January 2020)

No.	Pos.	Nation	Player
22	MF	AUT	Patrick Möschl (signed for 1. FC Magdeburg in January 2020)
30	MF	AUT	Matthäus Taferner (on loan at Wacker Innsbruck)
32	FW	CZE	Vasil Kušej (on loan at Wacker Innsbruck)
37	FW	SVN	Luka Štor (on loan at NK Aluminij)

== Transfers ==
=== Transfers in ===
Date	Position	Nationality	Name	From	Fee	Ref.
1 July 2019	LB	(Germany)	Chris Löwe	(England) Huddersfield Town	Undisclosed	
1 July 2019	GK	(Germany)	Kevin Broll	(Germany) Sonnenhof Großaspach	Free	
1 July 2019	CM	(Germany)	René Klingenburg	(Germany) Preußen Münster	Free	
1 July 2019	CM	(Austria)	Matthäus Taferner	(Austria) Wacker Innsbruck	Undisclosed	
13 August 2019	CF	(Sweden)	Alexander Jeremejeff	(Sweden) BK Häcken	Undisclosed	
14 August 2019	CF	(Slovenia)	Luka Štor	(Slovenia) NK Aluminij	Undisclosed	
29 January 2020	CF	(Denmark)	Simon Makienok	(Netherlands) Utrecht	Undisclosed	

=== Loans in ===
Date from	Position	Nationality	Name	From	Date until	Ref.
1 July 2019	DM	(Germany)	Dženis Burnić	(Germany) Borussia Dortmund	30 June 2020	
3 January 2020	LW	(Germany)	Marco Terrazzino	(Germany) SC Freiburg	30 June 2020	
3 January 2020	CF	(Germany)	Patrick Schmidt	(Germany) 1. FC Heidenheim	30 June 2020	
14 January 2020	CM	(Czech Republic)	Josef Hušbauer	(Czech Republic) Slavia Prague	30 June 2020	
17 January 2020	CF	(Ghana)	Godsway Donyoh	(Denmark) Nordsjælland	30 June 2020	
26 January 2020	DM	(Czech Republic)	Ondřej Petrák	(Germany) 1. FC Nürnberg	30 June 2020	

=== Transfers out ===
Date	Position	Nationality	Name	To	Fee	Ref.
1 July 2019	CB	(Germany)	Sören Gonther	(Germany) Erzgebirge Aue	Undisclosed	
1 July 2019	CM	(Germany)	Rico Benatelli	(Germany) St. Pauli	Free	
1 July 2019	LW	(Germany)	Marius Hauptmann	(Germany) FSV Zwickau	Free	
1 July 2019	RW	(Germany)	Erich Berko	(Germany) Darmstadt 98	Free	
1 July 2019	AM	(Syria)	Aias Aosman	(Turkey) Adana Demirspor	Free	
30 July 2019	LM	(Bosnia and Herzegovina)	Haris Duljević	(France) Nîmes Olympique	Undisclosed	
29 August 2019	CF	(Germany)	Lucas Röser	(Germany) 1. FC Kaiserslautern	Undisclosed	
22 January 2020	CF	(Senegal)	Moussa Koné	(France) Nîmes Olympique	Undisclosed	
31 January 2020	LM	(Austria)	Patrick Möschl	(Germany) 1. FC Magdeburg	Free	

=== Loans out ===
Date from	Position	Nationality	Name	To	Date until	Ref.
23 August 2019	RW	(Turkey)	Osman Atılgan	(Germany) Hansa Rostock	30 June 2020	
2 September 2019	CF	(Czech Republic)	Vasil Kušej	(Austria) Wacker Innsbruck	30 June 2020	
22 January 2020	CM	(Austria)	Matthäus Taferner	(Austria) Wacker Innsbruck	30 June 2020	
13 February 2020	CF	(Slovenia)	Luka Štor	(Slovenia) NK Aluminij	30 June 2020	

== Competitions ==
=== 2. Bundesliga ===
==== League table ====
Pos	Team	Pld	W	D	L	GF	GA	GD	Pts	Promotion, qualification or relegation
14	FC St. Pauli	34	9	12	13	41	50	−9	39	
15	Karlsruher SC	34	8	13	13	45	56	−11	37	
16	1. FC Nürnberg (O)	34	8	13	13	45	58	−13	37	Qualification for relegation play-offs
17	Wehen Wiesbaden (R)	34	9	7	18	45	65	−20	34	Relegation to 3. Liga
18	Dynamo Dresden (R)	34	8	8	18	32	58	−26	32	Relegation to 3. Liga

Source: DFB
Rules for classification: 1) Points; 2) Goal difference; 3) Goals scored; 4) Head-to-head points; 5) Head-to-head goal difference; 6) Head-to-head away goals scored; 7) Away goals scored; 8) Play-off.
(O) Play-off winners; (R) Relegated

==== Results ====
27 July 2019 1	Dynamo Dresden	0–1	1. FC Nürnberg	Dresden
13:00 CEST		Report	Dovedan 53'	Stadium: Rudolf-Harbig-Stadion; Attendance: 29,753; Referee: Felix Zwayer

3 August 2019 2	Karlsruher SC	4–2	Dynamo Dresden	Karlsruhe
13:00 CEST	Hofmann 45+3', 67'; Burnić 60' (o.g.); Stiefler 80'	Report	Horvath 45+2'; Koné 90'	Stadium: Wildparkstadion; Attendance: 13,099; Referee: Frank Willenborg

18 August 2019 3	Dynamo Dresden	2–1	1. FC Heidenheim	Dresden
13:30 CEST	Ebert 68'; Jeremejeff 82'	Report	Thomalla 89' (pen.)	Stadium: Rudolf-Harbig-Stadion; Attendance: 26,350; Referee: Patrick Alt

23 August 2019 4	Darmstadt 98	0–0	Dynamo Dresden	Darmstadt
18:30 CEST		Report		Stadium: Merck-Stadion am Böllenfalltor; Attendance: 14,610; Referee: Matthias Jöllenbeck

31 August 2019 5	Dynamo Dresden	3–3	FC St. Pauli	Dresden
13:00 CEST	Nikolaou 40', 54' (red card) 82'; Koné 85'	Report	Diamankatos 13', 29'; Sobota 16'	Stadium: Rudolf-Harbig-Stadion; Attendance: 29,953; Referee: Benjamin Cortus

15 September 2019 6	VfL Bochum	2–2	Dynamo Dresden	Bochum
13:30 CEST	Blum 79'; Losilla 85'	Report	Jeremejeff 47'; Koné 63'	Stadium: Ruhrstadion; Attendance: 16,859; Referee: Christof Günsch

22 September 2019 7	Dynamo Dresden	2–1	Jahn Regensburg	Dresden
13:30 CEST	Koné 55'; Ballas 88'	Report	George 27'	Stadium: Rudolf-Harbig-Stadion; Attendance: 27,260; Referee: Robert Kempter

29 September 2019 8	Erzgebirge Aue	4–1	Dynamo Dresden	Aue
13:30 CEST	Nazarov 27' (pen.), 39'; Testroet 45', 71'	Report	Koné 18'	Stadium: Erzgebirgsstadion; Attendance: 15,500; Referee: Robert Hartmann

5 October 2019 9	Dynamo Dresden	0–2	Hannover 96	Dresden
13:00 CEST	Kreuzer (red card) 65'	Report	Albornoz (yellow card) 22' (red card) 65'; Korb 72'; Teuchert 89'	Stadium: Rudolf-Harbig-Stadion; Attendance: 28,359; Referee: Christian Dingert

18 October 2019 10	Greuther Fürth	2–0	Dynamo Dresden	Fürth
18:30 CEST	Keita-Ruel 7', 38'	Report		Stadium: Sportpark Ronhof Thomas Sommer; Attendance: 9,770; Referee: Robert Kampka

26 October 2019 11	Dynamo Dresden	0–1	Arminia Bielefeld	Dresden
13:00 CEST		Report	Voglsammer 63'	Stadium: Rudolf-Harbig-Stadion; Attendance: 25,197; Referee: Felix Zwayer

3 November 2019 12	VfB Stuttgart	3–1	Dynamo Dresden	Stuttgart
13:30 CET	Hämäläinen 3' (o.g.); Ascacíbar 38'; Silas 84'	Report	Koné 51' (pen.)	Stadium: Mercedes-Benz Arena; Attendance: 52,129; Referee: Arne Aarnink

8 November 2019 13	Dynamo Dresden	1–0	Wehen Wiesbaden	Dresden
18:30 CET	Jeremejeff 41'	Report		Stadium: Rudolf-Harbig-Stadion; Attendance: 25,444; Referee: Martin Petersen

23 November 2019 14	Hamburger SV	2–1	Dynamo Dresden	Hamburg
13:00 CET	Kittel 67'; Kinsombi 90+4'	Report	Kreuzer 47'	Stadium: Volksparkstadion; Attendance: 51,586; Referee: Marco Fritz

30 November 2019 15	Dynamo Dresden	1–2	Holstein Kiel	Dresden
13:00 CET	Ballas 79'	Report	Iyoha 15'; Özcan 30'	Stadium: Rudolf-Harbig-Stadion; Attendance: 24,811; Referee: Christof Günsch

8 December 2019 16	Dynamo Dresden	1–1	SV Sandhausen	Dresden
13:30 CET	Jeremejeff 5'	Report	Scheu 30'	Stadium: Rudolf-Harbig-Stadion; Attendance: 26,019; Referee: Benjamin Cortus

15 December 2019 17	VfL Osnabrück	3–0	Dynamo Dresden	Osnabrück
13:30 CET	Heyer 41'; Schmidt 54'; Ajdini 78'	Report		Stadium: Stadion an der Bremer Brücke; Attendance: 15,352; Referee: René Rohde

20 December 2019 18	1. FC Nürnberg	2–0	Dynamo Dresden	Nuremberg
18:30 CET	Hack 33', 53'	Report		Stadium: Max-Morlock-Stadion; Attendance: 29,741; Referee: Matthias Jöllenbeck

29 January 2020 19	Dynamo Dresden	1–0	Karlsruher SC	Dresden
20:30 CET	Terrazzino 38'	Report		Stadium: Rudolf-Harbig-Stadion; Attendance: 27,595; Referee: Robert Kampka

2 February 2020 20	1. FC Heidenheim	0–0	Dynamo Dresden	Heidenheim an der Brenz
13:30 CET		Report		Stadium: Voith-Arena; Attendance: 12,150; Referee: Thorben Siewer

7 February 2020 21	Dynamo Dresden	2–3	Darmstadt 98	Dresden
18:30 CET	Hušbauer 4'; Schmidt 57'; Makienok (red card) 76'	Report	Paik 8'; Kempe 12'; Dursun 43'	Stadium: Rudolf-Harbig-Stadion; Attendance: 26,243; Referee: Michael Bacher

14 February 2020 22	FC St. Pauli	0–0	Dynamo Dresden	Hamburg
18:30 CET		Report		Stadium: Millerntor-Stadion; Attendance: 28,980; Referee: Daniel Schlager

22 February 2020 23	Dynamo Dresden	1–2	VfL Bochum	Dresden
13:00 CET	Nikolau 70'	Report	Ganvoula 65'; Janelt 90+3'	Stadium: Rudolf-Harbig-Stadion; Attendance: 26,279; Referee: Lasse Koslowski

28 February 2020 24	Jahn Regensburg	1–2	Dynamo Dresden	Regensburg
18:30 CET	Wekesser 63'	Report	Schmidt 70'; Makienok 77'	Stadium: Arena Regensburg; Attendance: 11,309; Referee: Guido Winkmann

8 March 2020 25	Dynamo Dresden	2–1	Erzgebirge Aue	Dresden
13:30 CET	Schmidt 44', 59'	Report	Hochscheidt 6'; Rizzuto (yellow card) 86' (red card) 90+2'	Stadium: Rudolf-Harbig-Stadion; Attendance: 30,573; Referee: Manuel Gräfe

15 March 2020	Hannover 96	v	Dynamo Dresden	Hanover
13:30 CET		Report		Stadium: Niedersachsenstadion
Note: Match postponed on 13 March 2020 due to the COVID-19 pandemic. Due to cases of COVID-19 within Dynamo Dresden's squad, the match was played later than the other matches from this matchday.

22 March 2020	Dynamo Dresden	v	Greuther Fürth	Dresden
13:30 CET		Report		Stadium: Rudolf-Harbig-Stadion
Note: Match postponed on 16 March 2020 due to the COVID-19 pandemic. Due to cases of COVID-19 within Dynamo Dresden's squad, the match was played later than the other matches from this matchday.

3 April 2020	Arminia Bielefeld	v	Dynamo Dresden	Bielefeld
18:30 CEST				Stadium: Bielefelder Alm
Note: Match postponed on 24 March 2020 due to the COVID-19 pandemic. It was rescheduled for the 27 May 2019, but was again postponed due to confirmed cases of COVID-19 within Dynamo Dresden's squad.

12 April 2020	Dynamo Dresden	v	VfB Stuttgart	Dresden
				Stadium: Rudolf-Harbig-Stadion
Note: Match postponed on 24 March 2020 due to the COVID-19 pandemic.

19 April 2020	SV Wehen Wiesbaden	v	Dynamo Dresden	Wiesbaden
				Stadium: Brita-Arena
Note: Match postponed on 24 March 2020 due to the COVID-19 pandemic.

26 April 2020	Dynamo Dresden	v	Hamburger SV	Dresden
				Stadium: Rudolf-Harbig-Stadion
Note: Match postponed on 24 March 2020 due to the COVID-19 pandemic.

3 May 2020	Holstein Kiel	v	Dynamo Dresden	Kiel
				Stadium: Holstein-Stadion
Note: Match postponed on 24 March 2020 due to the COVID-19 pandemic.

10 May 2020	SV Sandhausen	v	Dynamo Dresden	Sandhausen
				Stadium: BWT-Stadion am Hardtwald
Note: Match postponed on 24 March 2020 due to the COVID-19 pandemic.

17 May 2020	Dynamo Dresden	v	VfL Osnabrück	Dresden
				Stadium: Rudolf-Harbig-Stadion
Note: Match postponed on 24 March 2020 due to the COVID-19 pandemic.

31 May 2020 29	Dynamo Dresden	0–2	VfB Stuttgart	Dresden
13:30 CEST		Report	Al Ghaddioui 18'; Churlinov 88'	Stadium: Rudolf-Harbig-Stadion; Attendance: 0 (Note: Match played behind closed doors); Referee: Benjamin Cortus

3 June 2020 26	Hannover 96	3–0	Dynamo Dresden	Hanover
18:30 CEST	Ducksch 10'; Guidetti 17'; Prib 45+1'	Report		Stadium: Niedersachsenstadion; Attendance: 0 Referee: Manuel Gräfe

6 June 2020 30	Wehen Wiesbaden	2–3	Dynamo Dresden	Wiesbaden
13:00 CEST	Kyereh 24'; Kuhn 25'	Report	Franke 9' (o.g.); Schmidt 44'; Makienok 89'	Stadium: Brita-Arena; Attendance: 0 Referee: Benedikt Kempkes

9 June 2020 27	Dynamo Dresden	1–1	Greuther Fürth	Dresden
18:30 CEST	Makienok 54'	Report	Keita-Ruel 14'	Stadium: Rudolf-Harbig-Stadion; Attendance: 0 Referee: Christof Günsch

12 June 2020 31	Dynamo Dresden	0–1	Hamburger SV	Dresden
18:30 CEST		Report	Pohjanpalo 84'	Stadium: Rudolf-Harbig-Stadion; Attendance: 0 Referee: Robert Schröder

15 June 2020 28	Arminia Bielefeld	4–0	Dynamo Dresden	Bielefeld
20:30 CEST	Clauss 10'; Voglsammer 62'; Klos 65'; Soukou 87'	Report		Stadium: Bielefelder Alm; Attendance: 0 Referee: Johann Pfeifer

18 June 2020 32	Holstein Kiel	2–0	Dynamo Dresden	Kiel
18:30 CEST	Iyoha 45+1'; Lauberbach 80'	Report		Stadium: Holstein-Stadion; Attendance: 0 Referee: Patrick Ittrich

21 June 2020 33	SV Sandhausen	0–1	Dynamo Dresden	Sandhausen
15:30 CEST	Zenga (yellow card) 89' (red card) 89'	Report	C. Löwe (red card) 72'; Hartmann 90'	Stadium: BWT-Stadion am Hardtwald; Attendance: 0 Referee: Robert Kempter

28 June 2020 34	Dynamo Dresden	2–2	VfL Osnabrück	Dresden
15:30 CEST	Terrazzino 23'; Schmidt 59'	Report	Ouahim 76'; Schmidt 81'	Stadium: Rudolf-Harbig-Stadion; Attendance: 0 Referee: Tobias Reichel

=== DFB Pokal ===
10 August 2019 First Round	TuS Dassendorf	0–3	Dynamo Dresden	Zwickau (Note: The TuS Dassendorf v Dynamo Dresden match took place at the Stadion Zwickau in Zwickau instead of TuS Dassendorf's home stadium.)
15:30 CEST		Report	C. Löwe 37'; Burnić 75'; Röser 77'	Stadium: Stadion Zwickau; Attendance: 5,673; Referee: Jonas Weickenmeier

30 October 2019 Second Round	Hertha BSC	3–3 (a.e.t.) (5–4 p)	Dynamo Dresden	Berlin
20:45 CET	Lukebakio 48'; Duda 85' (pen.); Torunarigha 120+2'	Report	Koné 36'; Ebert 90' (pen.); Štor 107'	Stadium: Olympiastadion; Attendance: 70,429; Referee: Tobias Stieler
	Penalties
	Ibišević (penalty scored); Darida (penalty scored); Dilrosun (penalty scored); Rekik (penalty missed); Selke (penalty scored); Grujić (penalty scored)		(penalty scored) Ebert; (penalty scored) Horvath; (penalty missed) Müller; (penalty scored) Koné; (penalty scored) Štor; (penalty missed) Ehlers

== Player statistics ==
=== Appearances and goals ===
As of 28 June 2020

No.	Pos	Nat	Player	Total		2. Bundesliga		DFB-Pokal	
No.	Pos	Nat	Player	Apps	Goals	Apps	Goals	Apps	Goals
1	GK	(Germany) GER	Kevin Broll	35	0	33	0	2	0
2	DF	(Sweden) SWE	Linus Wahlqvist	26	0	22+3	0	1	0
4	MF	(Greece) GRE	Jannis Nikolaou	32	3	30	3	2	0
5	MF	(Germany) GER	Dženis Burnić	23	1	19+3	0	1	1
6	MF	(Germany) GER	Marco Hartmann	12	1	4+7	1	0+1	0
7	DF	(Germany) GER	Niklas Kreuzer	21	1	13+6	1	2	0
8	FW	(Turkey) TUR	Osman Atılgan	0	0	0	0	0	0
8	MF	(Czech Republic) CZE	Josef Hušbauer	10	1	8+2	1	0	0
9	FW	(Germany) GER	Lucas Röser	3	1	0+2	0	0+1	1
9	FW	(Germany) GER	Patrick Schmidt	15	6	13+2	6	0	0
10	MF	(Germany) GER	Marco Terrazzino	14	2	10+4	2	0	0
11	MF	(Bosnia and Herzegovina) BIH	Haris Duljević	0	0	0	0	0	0
11	FW	(Sweden) SWE	Alexander Jeremejeff	24	4	15+8	4	1	0
13	FW	(Denmark) DEN	Simon Makienok	9	3	7+2	3	0	0
14	FW	(Senegal) SEN	Moussa Koné	18	7	13+3	6	2	1
14	MF	(Czech Republic) CZE	Ondřej Petrák	13	0	10+3	0	0	0
15	DF	(Germany) GER	Chris Löwe	22	1	17+4	0	1	1
17	MF	(Germany) GER	René Klingenburg	26	0	12+13	0	1	0
18	DF	(Germany) GER	Jannik Müller	26	0	19+5	0	2	0
20	MF	(Germany) GER	Patrick Ebert	22	2	18+3	1	1	1
21	GK	(Germany) GER	Tim Boss	1	0	1	0	0	0
22	MF	(Austria) AUT	Patrick Möschl	5	0	4	0	0+1	0
23	DF	(Germany) GER	Florian Ballas	32	2	28+2	2	2	0
24	GK	(Germany) GER	Patrick Wiegers	0	0	0	0	0	0
25	FW	(Ghana) GHA	Godsway Donyoh	7	0	5+2	0	0	0
28	MF	(Turkey) TUR	Barış Atik	24	0	16+6	0	1+1	0
29	MF	(Austria) AUT	Sascha Horvath	25	1	19+4	1	1+1	0
30	MF	(Austria) AUT	Matthäus Taferner	4	0	1+3	0	0	0
31	DF	(Denmark) DEN	Brian Hämäläinen	20	0	14+4	0	1+1	0
32	FW	(Czech Republic) CZE	Vasil Kušej	0	0	0	0	0	0
34	MF	(Germany) GER	Justin Löwe	1	0	0+1	0	0	0
35	FW	(Germany) GER	Ransford-Yeboah Königsdörffer	7	0	3+4	0	0	0
36	MF	(Germany) GER	Max Kulke	6	0	2+4	0	0	0
37	FW	(Slovenia) SVN	Luka Štor	12	1	1+10	0	0+1	1
37	MF	(Germany) GER	Maximilian Großer	1	0	0+1	0	0	0
39	DF	(Germany) GER	Kevin Ehlers	20	0	17+2	0	1	0
