= 2017–18 Dynamo Dresden season =

Dynamo Dresden
2017–18 season
- President: Andreas Ritter
- Manager: Uwe Neuhaus
- Stadium: DDV-Stadion
- 2. Bundesliga: 14th
- DFB-Pokal: Second round
- Top goalscorer: League: Lucas Röser (9); All: Lucas Röser (9)
Home colours	Away colours
- All statistics correct as of 1 July 2017.

The 2017–18 Dynamo Dresden season was the 68th season in the football club's history and 2nd consecutive season in the second division of German football, the 2. Bundesliga and 7th overall. In addition to the domestic league, Dynamo Dresden also participated in this season's edition of the domestic cup, the DFB-Pokal. This was the 65th season for Dynamo Dresden in the Rudolf-Harbig-Stadion, located in Dresden, Germany. The season covered a period from 1 July 2017 to 30 June 2018.

== Players ==
=== Squad information ===
As of 2 February 2018

Note: Flags indicate national team as defined under FIFA eligibility rules; some limited exceptions apply. Players may hold more than one non-FIFA nationality.

No.	Pos.	Nation	Player
1	GK	GER	Markus Schubert
5	MF	GER	Manuel Konrad
6	MF	GER	Marco Hartmann (captain)
7	DF	GER	Niklas Kreuzer
8	MF	GER	Rico Benatelli
9	FW	GER	Lucas Röser
10	MF	SYR	Aias Aosman
11	MF	BIH	Haris Duljević
14	FW	TOG	Peniel Mlapa
16	DF	GER	Philip Heise
17	MF	GER	Andreas Lambertz
18	DF	GER	Jannik Müller
19	MF	GER	Paul Seguin (on loan from VfL Wolfsburg)

No.	Pos.	Nation	Player
20	DF	GER	Fabian Müller
22	MF	AUT	Patrick Möschl
23	DF	GER	Florian Ballas
24	GK	GER	Patrick Wiegers
25	GK	GER	Marvin Schwäbe (on loan from 1899 Hoffenheim)
26	DF	GER	Sören Gonther
27	FW	SEN	Moussa Koné
28	DF	GER	Marcel Franke (on loan from Norwich City)
29	MF	AUT	Sascha Horvath
32	FW	CZE	Vasil Kušej
36	MF	GER	Niklas Hauptmann
37	FW	GER	Pascal Testroet
40	MF	GER	Erich Berko

=== Transfers ===
==== Summer ====
In:

No.	Pos.	Nation	Player
8	MF	GER	Rico Benatelli (from Würzburger Kickers)
9	FW	GER	Lucas Röser (from SG Sonnenhof Großaspach)
11	MF	BIH	Haris Duljević (from FK Sarajevo)
14	FW	TOG	Peniel Mlapa (from VfL Bochum)
19	MF	GER	Paul Seguin (on loan from VfL Wolfsburg)
21	FW	FIN	Eero Markkanen (on loan from AIK Fotboll)
22	MF	AUT	Patrick Möschl (from SV Ried)
26	DF	GER	Sören Gonther (from FC St. Pauli)
29	MF	AUT	Sascha Horvath (from SK Sturm Graz)

Out:

No.	Pos.	Nation	Player
2	MF	GER	Akaki Gogia (loan return to Brentford)
3	DF	GER	Marc Wachs (on loan to VfL Osnabrück)
4	DF	ARG	Giuliano Modica (to 1. FC Kaiserslautern)
8	DF	GER	Nils Teixeira (to Arminia Bielefeld)
10	MF	GER	Marvin Stefaniak (to VfL Wolfsburg)
21	DF	GER	Hendrik Starostzik (to Hallescher FC)
28	DF	GER	Niklas Landgraf (to Hallescher FC)
30	FW	GER	Stefan Kutschke (loan return to 1. FC Nürnberg)
33	MF	GER	Marcel Hilßner (to Hansa Rostock)
--	MF	TUR	Sinan Tekerci (to FSV Zwickau, previously on loan to SC Preußen Münster)

=== Winter ===
In:

No.	Pos.	Nation	Player
27	FW	SEN	Moussa Koné (from FC Zürich)
28	DF	GER	Marcel Franke (on loan from Norwich City)

Out:

No.	Pos.	Nation	Player
21	FW	FIN	Eero Markkanen (loan return to AIK Fotboll)
34	MF	GER	Justin Löwe (on loan to FC Oberlausitz Neugersdorf)
39	DF	GER	Noah Awassi (to FSV Union Fürstenwalde)

== Matches ==
=== Legend ===
Win Draw Loss

=== Friendly matches ===
28 June 2017 Friendly	FC Viktoria 1889 Berlin	1−5	Dynamo Dresden	Großenhain
18:00	J. Müller 8' (o.g.)	Report	Aosman 22' (pen.), 37'; Brendel 25' (o.g.); Belay 35'; Testroet 73'	Stadium: Jahnkampfbahn; Attendance: 1,550

2 July 2017 Friendly	VSG Altglienicke	1−1	Dynamo Dresden	Pirna-Copitz
14:00	Mattuschka 79'	Report	Möschl 42'	Stadium: Willy-Tröger-Stadion; Attendance: 2.853

8 July 2017 Friendly	Slovan Liberec (Czech Republic)	3–0	Dynamo Dresden	Oppach
15:00	Potočný 8', 69'; Folprecht 86'	Report		Stadium: Lindenberg-Stadion; Attendance: 2.627

12 July 2017 Friendly	VfB Stuttgart	1−2	Dynamo Dresden	Kirchheim bei München
18:00	Ginczek 10'	Report	Heise 53'; Röser 64'	Stadium: Am Sportpark 2 Attendance: 1,088

15 July 2017 Friendly	SpVgg Unterhaching	2−3	Dynamo Dresden	Abensberg
14:30	Stahl 26'; Hain 36'	Report	Belay 46', 47'; Hilßner 50'	Stadium: Waldstadion; Attendance: 1,000

22 July 2017 Friendly	Dynamo Dresden	3−4	VfL Wolfsburg	Dresden
16:00	Konrad 10'; Testroet 18'; Heise 81'	Report	Hinds 20'; Gómez 27'; Błaszczykowski 28'; Mallı 33'	Stadium: DDV-Stadion; Attendance: 10,035; Referee: Alexander Sather (Grimma)

12 August 2017 Friendly	VfB Auerbach	2−2	Dynamo Dresden	Auerbach
13:30	Awassi 49' (o.g.); Kunert 79'	Report	Lambertz 89'; Markkanen 90'	Stadium: VfB-Stadion; Attendance: 580

1 September 2017 Friendly	Ústí nad Labem (Czech Republic)	0–4	Dynamo Dresden	Ústí nad Labem, Czech Republic
11:00		Report	Hauptmann 14'; J. Müller 23'; Kušej 62'; Aosman 68'	Stadium: Městský stadion Attendance: 353

13 September 2017 Friendly	Oberlausitz Neugersdorf	0–3	Dynamo Dresden	Radeberg
15:00		Report	Röser 8'; Mlapa 28'; Benatelli 83'	Stadium: Vorwärts-Stadion; Attendance: 1,100

6 October 2017 Friendly	Dynamo Dresden	1−0	Hallescher FC	Dresden
14:00	Seguin 90'	Report		Stadium: DDV-Stadion; Attendance: closed-doors

10 November 2017 Friendly	Rot-Weiß Erfurt	1−2	Dynamo Dresden	Erfurt
19:00	Benamar 41' (pen.)	Report	Möschl 38'; Mlapa 84'	Stadium: Steigerwaldstadion; Attendance: 1,915; Referee: Alexander Sather (Grimma)

6 January 2018 Friendly	Dynamo Dresden	1−2	VfL Wolfsburg	Marbella, Spain
15:30	Hartmann 59'	Report	Dimata 29'; Verhaegh 45' (pen.)	Stadium: Marbella Football Center

9 January 2018 Friendly	Dynamo Dresden	2−1	SV Werder Bremen II	Marbella, Spain
16:00	Lambertz 29'; Aosman 66'	Report	Schmidt 81'	Stadium: Marbella Football Center

13 January 2018 Friendly	Dynamo Dresden	3−1	(Netherlands) FC Groningen	La Línea de la Concepción, Spain
17:00	Ballas 41'; Benatelli 75'; Horvath 81'	Report	Antuna 90'	Stadium: Estadio Municipal de La Línea de la Concepción

19 January 2018 Friendly	Dynamo Dresden	1−4	(Czech Republic) FK Mladá Boleslav	Dresden
14:00	Mlapa 72'	Report	Přikryl 32'; Kateřiňák 49'; Valenta 77', 82'	Stadium: DDV-Stadion; Attendance: 250

31 January 2018 Friendly	BSG Stahl Riesa	1−7	Dynamo Dresden	Riesa
18:30	Kiontke 36'	Report	Berko 23'; Kušej 26'; J. Müller 31'; Möschl 48'; Aosman 67'; Kreuzer 77'; Mlapa 88' (pen.)	Stadium: Feralpi-Arena; Attendance: 725; Referee: Richard Hempel (Großnaundorf)

12 February 2018 Friendly	Bischofswerdaer FV 08	2−2	Dynamo Dresden	Bischofswerda
18:30	Hagemann 4'; Beckert 89'	Report	Benatelli 8'; Koné 58'	Stadium: Wesenitzsportpark; Attendance: 641

22 March 2018 Friendly	FK Viktoria Žižkov (Czech Republic)	1−4	Dynamo Dresden	Prague, Czech Republic
15:00	Musa 3'	Report	Testroet 56', 64'; Aosman 66'; Koné 75'	Stadium: eFotbal Arena; Attendance: 150

=== 2. Bundesliga ===
==== League table ====
Pos	Team	Pld	W	D	L	GF	GA	GD	Pts	Promotion, qualification or relegation
12	FC St. Pauli	34	11	10	13	35	48	−13	43	
13	1. FC Heidenheim	34	11	9	14	50	56	−6	42	
14	Dynamo Dresden	34	11	8	15	42	52	−10	41	
15	Greuther Fürth	34	10	10	14	37	48	−11	40	
16	Erzgebirge Aue (O)	34	10	10	14	35	49	−14	40	Qualification for relegation play-offs

Source: DFB
Rules for classification: 1) Points; 2) Goal difference; 3) Goals scored
(O) Play-off winners

==== Results summary ====
Overall								Home						Away					
Pld	W	D	L	GF	GA	GD	Pts	W	D	L	GF	GA	GD	W	D	L	GF	GA	GD
34	11	8	15	42	52	−10	41	5	4	8	19	27	−8	6	4	7	23	25	−2

Last updated: 13 May 2018.
Source: Kicker

==== Results by round ====
Round	1	2	3	4	5	6	7	8	9	10	11	12	13	14	15	16	17	18	19	20	21	22	23	24	25	26	27	28	29	30	31	32	33	34
Ground	H	A	H	A	H	A	H	A	A	H	A	H	A	H	A	H	A	A	H	A	H	A	H	A	H	H	A	H	A	H	A	H	A	H
Result	W	D	L	L	D	W	L	D	W	D	L	D	L	L	W	W	W	L	L	L	W	L	W	W	L	W	L	D	D	L	W	L	D	L
Position	3	6	11	13	14	10	12	10	9	9	12	12	15	15	12	12	12	12	12	13	12	13	13	12	13	9	12	13	13	15	11	12	13	14

Updated to match(es) played on 13 May 2018. Source: Kicker
A = Away; H = Home; W = Win; D = Draw; L = Loss

==== Matches ====
30 July 2017 1	Dynamo Dresden	1−0	MSV Duisburg	Dresden
15:30	Lambertz (yellow card) 45+2'; Röser 88'	Dynamo Report; Kicker Report; DFL Report	Wolze (yellow card) 46'; Fröde (yellow card) 59' (yellow-red card) 90+3'; Tashchy (yellow card) 63'	Stadium: DDV-Stadion; Attendance: 29,500; Referee: Felix Zwayer (Berlin)

7 August 2017 2	FC St. Pauli	2−2	Dynamo Dresden	Hamburg
20:30	Nehrig (yellow card) 1'; Buchtmann 22', 69'	Dynamo Report; Kicker Report; DFL Report	J. Müller (yellow card) 9'; Hartmann 29'; Röser 73'; Ballas (yellow card) 79'; Benatelli (yellow card) 90+5'	Stadium: Millerntor-Stadion; Attendance: 28,699; Referee: Guido Winkmann (Kerken)

19 August 2017 3	Dynamo Dresden	0–4	SV Sandhausen	Dresden
13:00	Kreuzer (yellow card) 25'; Hartmann (yellow card) 52'; Heise (yellow card) 69'	Dynamo Report; Kicker Report; DFL Report	Paqarada 25'; Höler 71'; Wright 79'; Daghfous 90'	Stadium: DDV-Stadion; Attendance: 27,253; Referee: Timo Gerach (Landau)

27 August 2017 4	VfL Bochum	3−2	Dynamo Dresden	Bochum
13:30	Bastians 16', 27' (pen.); Leitsch (yellow card) 70'; Gündüz (yellow card) 80'; Hinterseer 88', (yellow card) 90+2'	Dynamo Report; Kicker Report; DFL Report	Heise 11'; Kreuzer (yellow card) 56'; Berko (yellow card) 63'; Duljević (yellow card) 73'; Aosman 77', (yellow card) 90+2'	Stadium: Vonovia Ruhrstadion; Attendance: 14,808; Referee: Bibiana Steinhaus (Langenhagen)

8 September 2017 5	Dynamo Dresden	1–1	SpVgg Greuther Fürth	Dresden
18:30	Heise 36'; Seguin (yellow card) 40'	Dynamo Report; Kicker Report; DFL Report	Ernst (yellow card) 47'; Gjasula (yellow card) 49'; Wittek (yellow card) 58'; Hofmann 82'	Stadium: DDV-Stadion; Attendance: 28,016; Referee: Martin Thomsen (Kleve)

17 September 2017 6	SSV Jahn Regensburg	0−2	Dynamo Dresden	Regensburg
13:30	Knoll (yellow card) 51'; Gimber (yellow card) 54'	Dynamo Report; Kicker Report; DFL Report	F. Müller (yellow card) 36'; Horvath 48'; Aosman 51'; Hartmann (yellow card) 56'	Stadium: Continental Arena; Attendance: 14,831; Referee: Christof Günsch (Marburg)

20 September 2017 7	Dynamo Dresden	0−2	Arminia Bielefeld	Dresden
18:30		Dynamo Report; Kicker Report; DFL Report	Voglsammer 80'; Weihrauch (yellow card) 87', (goal) 90+2'	Stadium: DDV-Stadion; Attendance: 26,864; Referee: Benedikt Kempkes (Thür)

24 September 2017 8	SV Darmstadt 98	3−3	Dynamo Dresden	Darmstadt
13:30	Mehlem (yellow card) 17'; Kempe 30' (goal), 90+2'; Sulu (yellow card) 79'; Großkreutz (yellow card) 80'; Boyd 90'	Dynamo Report; Kicker Report; DFL Report	Konrad 23' 34', 80'; Kreuzer (yellow card) 45+1'; F. Müller (yellow card) 54'; Ballas (yellow card) 58'; Lambertz (yellow card) 90+4'	Stadium: Merck-Stadion am Böllenfalltor; Attendance: 17,000; Referee: Sven Waschitzki (Essen)

1 October 2017 9	1. FC Heidenheim	0−2	Dynamo Dresden	Heidenheim an der Brenz
13:30	Titsch-Rivero (yellow card) 29'; Halloran (yellow card) 40'; Pusch (yellow card) 49'; Dovedan (yellow card) 71'	Dynamo Report; Kicker Report; DFL Report	Konrad (yellow card) 14'; Kreuzer 26'; Mlapa 53'; Duljević (yellow card) 90+4'	Stadium: Voith-Arena; Attendance: 12,100; Referee: Florian Badstübner (Windsbach)

14 October 2017 10	Dynamo Dresden	2−2	FC Ingolstadt 04	Dresden
13:00	Mlapa 30' (pen.), 49'; Hartmann (yellow card) 47'	Dynamo Report; Kicker Report; DFL Report	Christiansen (yellow card) 10'; Gaus 13'; Morales 23' (yellow card) 59'; Cohen (yellow card) 63'; Matip (yellow card) 83'	Stadium: DDV-Stadion; Attendance: 28,484; Referee: Sven Jablonski (Bremen)

22 October 2017 11	1. FC Nürnberg	2−1	Dynamo Dresden	Nuremberg
13:30	Ishak 7'; Kirschbaum (yellow card) 31'; Teuchert (yellow card) 54', (goal) 82'	Dynamo Report; Kicker Report; DFL Report	J. Müller (yellow card) 9'; Mlapa 69' (pen.); Ballas (yellow card) 90'; Aosman (yellow card) 90'; Heise (red card) 90+3'	Stadium: Max-Morlock-Stadion; Attendance: 33,601; Referee: Robert Kempter (Stockach)

29 October 2017 12	Dynamo Dresden	1−1	Eintracht Braunschweig	Dresden
13:30	Möschl 12'; J. Müller (yellow card) 30'	Dynamo Report; Kicker Report; DFL Report	Valsvik (yellow card) 11', (goal) 60'; Sauer (yellow card) 48'; Reichel (yellow card) 86'; Samson (yellow card) 90+2'	Stadium: DDV-Stadion; Attendance: 29,312; Referee: Matthias Jöllenbeck (Freiburg)

5 November 2017 13	Holstein Kiel	3−0	Dynamo Dresden	Kiel
13:30	Ducksch 24'; Drexler (penalty missed) 65'; Kinsombi (yellow card) 69'; Lewerenz 83'; Schindler 88'	Dynamo Report; Kicker Report; DFL Report	Kreuzer (yellow card) 55'	Stadium: Holstein-Stadion; Attendance: 10,487; Referee: René Rohde (Rostock)

20 November 2017 14	Dynamo Dresden	1−2	1. FC Kaiserslautern	Dresden
20:30	Röser 14'; Hartmann (yellow card) 84'	Dynamo Report; Kicker Report; DFL Report	Kessel (yellow card) 41'; Vučur 85'; Spalvis 88'	Stadium: DDV-Stadion; Attendance: 27,224; Referee: Tobias Reichel (Stuttgart)

27 November 2017 15	Fortuna Düsseldorf	1−3	Dynamo Dresden	Düsseldorf
20:30	Raman 31'; Fink (yellow card) 62'; Hennings (yellow card) 90+1'	Dynamo Report; Kicker Report; DFL Report	Hartmann 4'; Röser 5'; Duljević 10'; Heise (yellow card) 82'	Stadium: Esprit Arena; Attendance: 22,602; Referee: Benjamin Brand (Bamberg)

3 December 2017 16	Dynamo Dresden	4−0	FC Erzgebirge Aue	Dresden
13:30	Röser 21'; Benatelli 44'; Ballas 47', (yellow card) 67'; Hartmann (yellow card) 73'; Berko 75'	Dynamo Report; Kicker Report; DFL Report	Riese (yellow card) 35'; Rapp (yellow card) 62'	Stadium: DDV-Stadion; Attendance: 30,453; Referee: Manuel Gräfe (Berlin)

9 December 2017 17	1. FC Union Berlin	0−1	Dynamo Dresden	Berlin
13:00	Torrejón (yellow card) 73'	Dynamo Report; Kicker Report; DFL Report	Seguin (yellow card) 69'; Lambertz 71', (yellow card) 90'	Stadium: Stadion An der Alten Försterei; Attendance: 22,012; Referee: Bastian Dankert (Rostock)

17 December 2017 18	MSV Duisburg	2−0	Dynamo Dresden	Duisburg
13:30	Iljutcenko 45+1'; Daschner (yellow card) 72'; Wolze 83'; Engin (yellow card) 85'	Dynamo Report; Kicker Report; DFL Report	Mlapa (yellow card) 61'; Lambertz (yellow card) 63'; Jannik Müller (yellow card) 82'	Stadium: MSV-Arena; Attendance: 14,792; Referee: Robert Schröder (Hannover)

25 January 2018 19	Dynamo Dresden	1−3	FC St. Pauli	Dresden
20:30	Berko (yellow card) 23'; Hauptmann (yellow card) 30'; Konrad (yellow card) 53'; Röser 88'	Dynamo Report; Kicker Report; DFL Report	Sobota 8', 81'; Dudziak (yellow card) 19'; Neudecker 71'	Stadium: DDV-Stadion; Attendance: 28,706; Referee: Deniz Aytekin (Oberasbach)

28 January 2018 20	SV Sandhausen	1−0	Dynamo Dresden	Sandhausen
13:30	Kister (yellow card) 50'; Karl (yellow card) 67'; Linsmayer 80'	Dynamo Report; Kicker Report; DFL Report	Duljević (yellow card) 43' (yellow-red card) 54'; Mlapa (yellow card) 75'; Konrad (yellow card) 87'; Ballas (yellow card) 89'	Stadium: BWT-Stadion am Hardtwald; Attendance: 6,234; Referee: Benedikt Kempkes (Thür)

4 February 2018 21	Dynamo Dresden	2−0	VfL Bochum	Dresden
13:30	Röser 2' (pen.); J. Müller (yellow card) 30'; Franke (yellow card) 35'; Kreuzer (yellow card) 61'; Koné 89'	Dynamo Report; Kicker Report; DFL Report	Gyamerah (yellow card) 13'	Stadium: DDV-Stadion; Attendance: 24,097; Referee: Christian Dietz (Munich)

11 February 2018 22	SpVgg Greuther Fürth	1−0	Dynamo Dresden	Fürth
13:30	Green (yellow card) 11'; Gugganig 39'	Union Report; Kicker Report; DFL Report	Aosman (yellow card) 45'; Horvath (yellow card) 79'; Ballas (yellow card) 90'	Stadium: Sportpark Ronhof Thomas Sommer; Attendance: 10,390; Referee: Thorben Siewer (Olpe)

18 February 2018 23	Dynamo Dresden	1−0	SSV Jahn Regensburg	Dresden
13:30	Berko 65'; Heise (yellow card) 82'	Dynamo Report; Kicker Report; DFL Report	Lais (yellow card) 43'; Nachreiner (yellow card) 53'; Knoll (yellow card) 54'; Gimber (yellow card) 90+1'	Stadium: DDV-Stadion; Attendance: 25,003; Referee: Daniel Siebert (Berlin)

23 February 2018 24	Arminia Bielefeld	2−3	Dynamo Dresden	Bielefeld
18:30	Schütz (yellow card) 23'; Hartherz 28'; Dick (yellow card) 30'; Voglsammer 76' (pen.); Klos (yellow card) 85'; Kerschbaumer (yellow card) 90+1'	Dynamo Report; Kicker Report; DFL Report	Koné 48'; Konrad (yellow card) 56'; Röser 64', 79'; Mlapa (yellow card) 85'	Stadium: SchücoArena; Attendance: 17,503; Referee: Christof Günsch (Marburg)

2 March 2018 25	Dynamo Dresden	0−2	SV Darmstadt 98	Dresden
18:30	Kreuzer (yellow card) 78'	Dynamo Report; Kicker Report; DFL Report	Jones 29'; Kempe 55'	Stadium: DDV-Stadion; Attendance: 26,053; Referee: Tobias Reichel (Stuttgart)

9 March 2018 26	Dynamo Dresden	3−2	1. FC Heidenheim	Dresden
18:30	Koné 5', 11', 83'	Dynamo Report; Kicker Report; DFL Report	Thiel 7'; Wittek (yellow card) 40'; Seguin 59' (o.g.); Thomalla (yellow card) 77'; Griesbeck (yellow card) 80'	Stadium: DDV-Stadion; Attendance: 24,763; Referee: Sven Waschitzki (Essen)

18 March 2018 27	FC Ingolstadt 04	4−2	Dynamo Dresden	Ingolstadt
13:30	Pledl 16'; Schröck 28'; Kittel 90+1'; Cohen 90+4'	Dynamo Report; Kicker Report; DFL Report	Koné 59' (pen.); Ballas 79'	Stadium: Audi Sportpark; Attendance: 11,388; Referee: Manuel Gräfe (Berlin)

31 March 2018 28	Dynamo Dresden	1−1	1. FC Nürnberg	Dresden
13:00	Koné (yellow card) 26'; Benatelli 45'; Kreuzer (yellow card) 54'	Dynamo Report; Kicker Report; DFL Report	Ewerton (yellow card) 16'; Stefaniak (yellow card) 39'; Leibold (yellow card) 42'; Behrens 53'; Möhwald (yellow card) 75'; Valentini (yellow card) 90'	Stadium: DDV-Stadion; Attendance: 30,765; Referee: Bibiana Steinhaus (Langenhagen)

8 April 2018 29	Eintracht Braunschweig	1−1	Dynamo Dresden	Braunschweig
13:30	Hofmann 23', (yellow card) 84'; Sauer (yellow card) 28'	Dynamo Report; Kicker Report; DFL Report	Duljević 8'	Stadium: Eintracht-Stadion; Attendance: 22,700; Referee: Sven Jablonski (Bremen)

14 April 2018 30	Dynamo Dresden	0−4	Holstein Kiel	Dresden
13:00	Koné (penalty missed) 4', (yellow card) 57'; Hauptmann (yellow card) 22'; Franke (yellow card) 74'	Dynamo Report; Kicker Report; DFL Report	Schindler 28' (pen.); Mühling (yellow card) 34', (goal) 86'; Ducksch 65', 90+4'	Stadium: DDV-Stadion; Attendance: 29,035; Referee: Felix Zwayer (Berlin)

22 April 2018 31	1. FC Kaiserslautern	0−1	Dynamo Dresden	Kaiserslautern
13:30	Albæk (yellow card) 16'; Mwene (yellow card) 40'; Guwara (yellow card) 53'	Dynamo Report; Kicker Report; DFL Report	Berko (yellow card) 32', (goal) 79'; Hartmann (yellow card) 38' (yellow-red card) 84'	Stadium: Fritz-Walter-Stadion; Attendance: 26,851; Referee: Daniel Siebert (Berlin)

28 April 2018 32	Dynamo Dresden	1−2	Fortuna Düsseldorf	Dresden
13:00	Koné (yellow card) 58', (goal) 64'; Kreuzer (yellow card) 66'; Ballas (yellow card) 90+1'	Dynamo Report; Kicker Report; DFL Report	Neuhaus 9', (yellow card) 53'; Hennings 90'	Stadium: DDV-Stadion; Attendance: 30,953; Referee: Robert Hartmann (Wangen im Allgäu)

6 May 2018 33	FC Erzgebirge Aue	0−0	Dynamo Dresden	Aue
15:30	Kalig (yellow card) 16'; Rizzuto (yellow card) 84'	Dynamo Report; Kicker Report; DFL Report	Berko (yellow card) 19'; Kreuzer (yellow card) 45+1'; Mlapa (yellow card) 85'	Stadium: Sparkassen-Erzgebirgsstadion; Attendance: 15,000; Referee: Frank Willenborg (Osnabrück)

13 May 2018 34	Dynamo Dresden	0−1	1. FC Union Berlin	Dresden
15:30		Dynamo Report; Kicker Report; DFL Report	Hedlund (yellow card) 44'; Hosiner 82'	Stadium: DDV-Stadion; Attendance: 30,785; Referee: Christian Dingert (Gries)

=== DFB-Pokal ===
11 August 2017 R1	TuS Koblenz	2−3	Dynamo Dresden	Zwickau (Note: The match took place at the Stadion Zwickau in Zwickau instead of TuS Koblenz's home stadium due to ongoing renovation of the latter.)
19:00	Bozic 6'; Antonaci (yellow card) 26'; Popovits (yellow card) 48', (goal) 80'; Glockner (yellow card) 57', (penalty missed) 85'	Dynamo Report; Kicker Report; DFB Report	Berko 11'; Heise 49'; Aosman 84'; Ballas (yellow card) 85'; Röser (yellow card) 86'	Stadium: Stadion Zwickau; Attendance: 6,300; Referee: Markus Schmidt (Stuttgart)

25 October 2017 R2	SC Freiburg	3−1	Dynamo Dresden	Freiburg im Breisgau
20:45	Petersen 50'; Schuster 61'; Haberer 81'	Dynamo Report; Kicker Report; DFB Report	Benatelli 48', (yellow card) 79'	Stadium: Schwarzwald-Stadion; Attendance: 17,800; Referee: Benjamin Brand (Unterspiesheim)

== Squad and statistics ==
As of 13 May 2018

No.	Pos	Player	2. Bundesliga		DFB-Pokal		Total	
No.	Pos	Player	Apps	Goals	Apps	Goals	Apps	Goals
1	GK	(Germany) Markus Schubert	9	0	1	0	10	0
5	MF	(Germany) Manuel Konrad	22+4	3	2	0	28	3
6	MF	(Germany) Marco Hartmann	15+4	2	0+1	0	20	2
7	DF	(Germany) Niklas Kreuzer	20+5	1	1	0	26	1
8	MF	(Germany) Rico Benatelli	17+4	2	1+1	1	23	3
9	FW	(Germany) Lucas Röser	18+10	9	2	0	30	9
10	MF	(Syria) Aias Aosman	10+7	2	2	1	19	3
11	MF	(Bosnia and Herzegovina) Haris Duljević	22+6	2	0+1	0	29	2
14	DF	(Togo) Peniel Mlapa	10+11	4	0+1	0	22	4
16	DF	(Germany) Philip Heise	24+2	2	2	1	28	3
17	MF	(Germany) Andreas Lambertz	9+3	1	0	0	12	1
18	DF	(Germany) Jannik Müller	21+3	0	1	0	25	0
19	MF	(Germany) Paul Seguin	20+3	0	0	0	23	0
20	DF	(Germany) Fabian Müller	8+2	0	1	0	11	0
22	MF	(Austria) Patrick Möschl	6+5	1	1	0	12	1
23	DF	(Germany) Florian Ballas	28+3	2	2	0	33	2
24	GK	(Germany) Patrick Wiegers	0	0	0	0	0	0
25	GK	(Germany) Marvin Schwäbe	25	0	1	0	26	0
26	DF	(Germany) Sören Gonther	4	0	1	0	5	0
27	FW	(Senegal) Moussa Koné	10+4	7	0	0	14	7
28	DF	(Germany) Marcel Franke	16	0	0	0	16	0
29	MF	(Austria) Sascha Horvath	14+6	1	2	0	22	1
32	FW	(Czech Republic) Vasil Kušej	0	0	0	0	0	0
36	MF	(Germany) Niklas Hauptmann	21+4	0	0+1	0	26	0
37	FW	(Germany) Pascal Testroet	3+4	0	0	0	7	0
40	MF	(Germany) Erich Berko	26+7	3	2	1	35	4
Players transferred out during the season
21	FW	(Finland) Eero Markkanen	0+3	0	0+1	0	4	0
34	MF	(Germany) Justin Löwe	0	0	0	0	0	0
39	DF	(Germany) Noah Awassi	0	0	0	0	0	0
