= 2018–19 Dynamo Dresden season =

Dynamo Dresden
2018–19 season
- Manager: Uwe Neuhaus (until 22 August 2018); Cristian Fiél (until 11 September 2018); Maik Walpurgis (until 24 February 2019); Cristian Fiél
- Stadium: Rudolf-Harbig-Stadion
- 2. Bundesliga: 12th
- DFB-Pokal: First round
- Top goalscorer: League: Moussa Koné (9); All: Moussa Koné (9)
Home colours	Away colours	Third colours

The 2018–19 Dynamo Dresden season was the 69th season in the football club's history and third consecutive season in the second division of German football, the 2. Bundesliga and 8th overall. In addition to the domestic league, Dynamo Dresden also competed in this season's edition of the domestic cup, the DFB-Pokal. The season covered a period from 1 July 2018 to 30 June 2019.

== Season summary ==
On 22 August 2018, Dynamo parted company with manager Uwe Neuhaus. He was replaced by Cristian Fiél on an interim basis, before Maik Walpurgis was appointed as his permanent replacement on 11 September 2018. Malpurgis was sacked in February 2019, with Cristian Fiél appointed as his replacement.

== Squad ==
As of 6 February 2019

Note: Flags indicate national team as defined under FIFA eligibility rules; some limited exceptions apply. Players may hold more than one non-FIFA nationality.

No.	Pos.	Nation	Player
1	GK	(Germany) GER	Markus Schubert
2	MF	(Sweden) SWE	Linus Wahlqvist
3	DF	(Bosnia and Herzegovina) BIH	Dario Đumić (on loan from Utrecht)
4	DF	(Greece) GRE	Jannis Nikolaou
5	MF	(Germany) GER	Dženis Burnić (on loan from Borussia Dortmund)
6	MF	(Germany) GER	Marco Hartmann (captain)
7	DF	(Germany) GER	Niklas Kreuzer
8	MF	(Italy) ITA	Rico Benatelli
9	FW	(Germany) GER	Lucas Röser
10	MF	(Syria) SYR	Aias Aosman
11	MF	(Bosnia and Herzegovina) BIH	Haris Duljević
14	FW	(Senegal) SEN	Moussa Koné
15	FW	(Germany) GER	Osman Atılgan
18	DF	(Germany) GER	Jannik Müller

No.	Pos.	Nation	Player
20	MF	(Germany) GER	Patrick Ebert
21	GK	(Germany) GER	Tim Boss
22	MF	(Austria) AUT	Patrick Möschl
23	DF	(Germany) GER	Florian Ballas
24	GK	(Germany) GER	Patrick Wiegers
26	DF	(Germany) GER	Sören Gonther
28	MF	(Turkey) TUR	Barış Atik
31	DF	(Denmark) DEN	Brian Hämäläinen
32	FW	(Czech Republic) CZE	Vasil Kušej
34	MF	(Germany) GER	Justin Löwe
35	MF	(Germany) GER	Marius Hauptmann
36	MF	(Germany) GER	Max Kulke
40	MF	(Germany) GER	Erich Berko

== Competitions ==
=== 2. Bundesliga ===
==== League table ====
Pos	Team	Pld	W	D	L	GF	GA	GD	Pts
10	Darmstadt 98	34	13	7	14	45	53	−8	46
11	VfL Bochum	34	11	11	12	49	50	−1	44
12	Dynamo Dresden	34	11	9	14	41	48	−7	42
13	Greuther Fürth	34	10	12	12	37	56	−19	42
14	Erzgebirge Aue	34	11	7	16	43	47	−4	40

Source: DFB
Rules for classification: 1) Points; 2) Goal difference; 3) Goals scored; 4) Head-to-head points; 5) Head-to-head goal difference; 6) Head-to-head goals scored; 7) Head-to-head away goals scored; 8) Away goals scored; 9) Play-off.

==== Matches ====
6 August 2018 1	Dynamo Dresden	1–0	MSV Duisburg	Dresden
20:30 CEST	Röser 39'	Report		Stadium: Rudolf-Harbig-Stadion; Attendance: 28,733; Referee: Daniel Siebert

11 August 2018 2	Arminia Bielefeld	2–1	Dynamo Dresden	Bielefeld
15:30 CEST	Edmundsson 27'; Klos 33'	Report	Berko 86'	Stadium: Bielefelder Alm; Attendance: 19,409; Referee: Sven Jablonski

26 August 2018 3	Dynamo Dresden	1–3	1. FC Heidenheim	Dresden
13:30 CEST	Berko 68'	Report	Schnatterer 31' (pen.), 44'; Dovedan 69'	Stadium: Rudolf-Harbig-Stadion; Attendance: 26,868; Referee: Frank Willenborg

1 September 2018 4	Dynamo Dresden	v	Hamburger SV	Dresden
13:00 CEST				Stadium: Rudolf-Harbig-Stadion
Note: Match postponed as local police unable to police event due to 2018 Chemnitz protests.

14 September 2018 5	Jahn Regensburg	0–2	Dynamo Dresden	Regensburg
18:30 CEST		Report	Aosman 22'; Đumić 52'	Stadium: Arena Regensburg; Attendance: 13,629; Referee: René Rohde

18 September 2018 4	Dynamo Dresden	0–1	Hamburger SV	Dresden
18:30 CEST		Report	Hwang 67'	Stadium: Rudolf-Harbig-Stadion; Attendance: 30,723; Referee: Felix Zwayer

22 September 2018 6	Dynamo Dresden	4–1	Darmstadt 98	Dresden
13:00 CEST	Koné 3', 90+1'; Ebert 54'; Heise 60'	Report	Heller 18'	Stadium: Rudolf-Harbig-Stadion; Attendance: 26,530; Referee: Benedikt Kempkes

25 September 2018 7	VfL Bochum	0–1	Dynamo Dresden	Bochum
18:30 CEST		Report	Koné 39' (pen.)	Stadium: Vonovia-Ruhrstadion; Attendance: 15,511; Referee: Martin Petersen

30 September 2018 8	Dynamo Dresden	0–1	Greuther Fürth	Dresden
13:30 CEST		Report	Keita-Ruel 85'	Stadium: Rudolf-Harbig-Stadion; Attendance: 27,750; Referee: Patrick Ittrich

6 October 2018 9	1. FC Magdeburg	2–2	Dynamo Dresden	Magdeburg
13:00 CEST	Kreuzer 60' (o.g.); Bülter 90+1'	Report	Koné 7'; Aosman 23'	Stadium: MDCC-Arena; Attendance: 23,024; Referee: Manuel Gräfe

19 October 2018 10	Dynamo Dresden	1–1	Erzgebirge Aue	Dresden
18:30 CEST	Koné 26'	Report	Riese 24'; Rapp (red card) 53'	Stadium: Rudolf-Harbig-Stadion; Attendance: 30,769; Referee: Robert Schröder

28 October 2018 11	1. FC Union Berlin	0−0	Dynamo Dresden	Berlin
13:30 CET		Report		Stadium: Stadion An der Alten Försterei; Attendance: 22,012; Referee: Sven Jablonski

2 November 2018 12	Dynamo Dresden	3−1	SV Sandhausen	Dresden
18:30 CET	Koné 11'; Aosman 31'; Benatelli 76'	Report	Schleusener 22'	Stadium: Rudolf-Harbig-Stadion; Attendance: 27,253; Referee: Michael Bacher

10 November 2018 13	1. FC Köln	8–1	Dynamo Dresden	Cologne
13:00 CET	Córdoba 3', 51'; Terodde 42', 46', 61'; Hector 56', 83'; Schaub 78'	Report	Atik 72'	Stadium: RheinEnergieStadion; Attendance: 50,000; Referee: Felix Brych

25 November 2018 14	Dynamo Dresden	2–0	FC Ingolstadt	Dresden
13:30 CET	Ebert 7' (pen.); Koné 16'	Report	Neumann (red card) 5'	Stadium: Rudolf-Harbig-Stadion; Attendance: 26,853; Referee: Matthias Jöllenbeck

1 December 2018 15	FC St. Pauli	1−1	Dynamo Dresden	Hamburg
13:00 CET	Dudziak 47'	Report	Müller 86'	Stadium: Millerntor-Stadion; Attendance: 29,546; Referee: Deniz Aytekin

9 December 2018 16	Dynamo Dresden	0−2	Holstein Kiel	Dresden
13:30 CET		Report	Mühling 8'; Honsak 22'	Stadium: Rudolf-Harbig-Stadion; Attendance: 26,407; Referee: Johann Pfeifer

15 December 2018 17	SC Paderborn	3−0	Dynamo Dresden	Paderborn
13:00 CET	Zolinski 54'; Michel 77'; Klement 90+3'	Report		Stadium: Benteler-Arena; Attendance: 9,335; Referee: Arne Aarnink

23 December 2018 18	MSV Duisburg	1–3	Dynamo Dresden	Duisburg
13:30 CET	Souza 66'	Report	Röser 4'; Atik 45+2'; Koné 53'	Stadium: MSV-Arena; Attendance: 14,836; Referee: Florian Heft

30 January 2019 19	Dynamo Dresden	3–4	Arminia Bielefeld	Dresden
20:30 CET	Atılgan 19'; Hämäläinen 27' (pen.); Koné 40'; Hartmann (red card) 77'	Report	Atik 34' (o.g.); Edmundsson 54'; Klos 69' (pen.); Börner 79'	Stadium: Rudolf-Harbig-Stadion; Attendance: 24,706; Referee: Robert Kampka

2 February 2019 20	1. FC Heidenheim	1–0	Dynamo Dresden	Heidenheim an der Brenz
13:00 CET	Dovedan 35'	Report		Stadium: Voith-Arena; Attendance: 11,200; Referee: Martin Thomsen

11 February 2019 21	Hamburger SV	1–0	Dynamo Dresden	Hamburg
20:30 CET	Holtby 84'	Report		Stadium: Volksparkstadion; Attendance: 46,924; Referee: Frank Willenborg

17 February 2019 22	Dynamo Dresden	0–0	Jahn Regensburg	Dresden
13:30 CET		Report		Stadium: Rudolf-Harbig-Stadion; Attendance: 25,303; Referee: Benedikt Kempkes

23 February 2019 23	Darmstadt 98	2–0	Dynamo Dresden	Darmstadt
13:00 CET	Kempe 43' (pen.); Dursun 85'	Report		Stadium: Stadion am Böllenfalltor; Attendance: 11,330; Referee: Patrick Alt

3 March 2019 24	Dynamo Dresden	2–2	VfL Bochum	Dresden
13:30 CET	Atik 33'; Nikolaou 59'	Report	Hinterseer 10'; Pantović 14'	Stadium: Rudolf-Harbig-Stadion; Attendance: 28,153; Referee: Michael Bacher

10 March 2019 25	Greuther Fürth	v	Dynamo Dresden	Fürth
				Stadium: Sportpark Ronhof Thomas Sommer
Note: Match postponed due to a storm warning for Fürth.

16 March 2019 26	Dynamo Dresden	1–1	1. FC Magdeburg	Dresden
13:00 CET	Röser 86'	Report	Rother 43'	Stadium: Rudolf-Harbig-Stadion; Attendance: 30,500; Referee: Daniel Siebert

1 April 2019 27	Erzgebirge Aue	1–3	Dynamo Dresden	Aue
	Zulechner 27'	Report	Röser 50'; Löwe 81'; Berko 90+1'	Stadium: Erzgebirgsstadion; Attendance: 14,550; Referee: Robert Hartmann

4 April 2019 25	Greuther Fürth	0–0	Dynamo Dresden	Fürth
19:00 CEST		Report		Stadium: Sportpark Ronhof Thomas Sommer; Attendance: 12,590; Referee: Arne Aarnink

7 April 2019 28	Dynamo Dresden	0−0	1. FC Union Berlin	Dresden
13:30 CEST		Report		Stadium: Rudolf-Harbig-Stadion; Attendance: 30,700; Referee: Bibiana Steinhaus

13 April 2019 29	SV Sandhausen	3–1	Dynamo Dresden	Sandhausen
	Zhirov 69'; Daghfous 72'; Wooten 79'	Report	Berko 56'	Stadium: BWT-Stadion am Hardtwald; Attendance: 6,541; Referee: Florian Heft

21 April 2019 30	Dynamo Dresden	3–0	1. FC Köln	Dresden
13:30 CEST	Berko 12', 66'; Duljevic 35'	Report		Stadium: Rudolf-Harbig-Stadion; Attendance: 30,753; Referee: Robert Schröder

26 April 2019 31	Ingolstadt 04	1–0	Dynamo Dresden	Ingolstadt
18:30 CEST	Kittel 47'	Report		Stadium: Audi Sportpark; Attendance: 11,208; Referee: Daniel Schlager

3 May 2019 32	Dynamo Dresden	2−1	FC St. Pauli	Dresden
18:30 CEST	Ebert 23' (pen.); Burnić (yellow card) 55', (goal) 75'; Koné (yellow card) 63'	Report	Miyaichi (yellow card) 15'; Diamantakos 57'; Becker (yellow card) 60'; Park (yellow card) 82'	Stadium: Rudolf-Harbig-Stadion; Attendance: 30,803; Referee: Robert Kempter

12 May 2019 33	Holstein Kiel	3–0	Dynamo Dresden	Kiel
15:30 CEST	Lee 19'; Meffert 69'; Wahl 77'	Report		Stadium: Holstein-Stadion; Attendance: 12,712; Referee: Michael Bacher

19 May 2019 34	Dynamo Dresden	3–1	Paderborn 07	Dresden
15:30 CEST	Atik 18', 38', 63'	Report	Klement 10'	Stadium: Rudolf-Harbig-Stadion; Attendance: 30,575; Referee: Sven Jablonski

=== DFB-Pokal ===
18 August 2018 First round	SV Rödinghausen	3–2 (a.e.t.)	Dynamo Dresden	Lotte (Note: The SV Rödinghausen v Dynamo Dresden match took place at the Frimo Stadion in Lotte instead of SV Rödinghausen's home stadium.)
15:30	Meyer 20'; Engelmann 45+1'; Kunze 120+3'	Report	Duljević 11'; Aosman 25'	Stadium: Frimo Stadion; Attendance: 6,000; Referee: Florian Heft
