= List of German football transfers winter 2017–18 =

This is a list of German football transfers in the winter transfer window 2017–18 by club. Only transfers of the Bundesliga, and 2. Bundesliga are included.

== Bundesliga ==
Note: Flags indicate national team as has been defined under FIFA eligibility rules. Players may hold more than one non-FIFA nationality.

=== FC Bayern Munich ===
In:

No.	Pos.	Nation	Player
2	FW	GER	Sandro Wagner (from 1899 Hoffenheim)

Out:

No.	Pos.	Nation	Player
34	DF	AUT	Marco Friedl (on loan to Werder Bremen)

=== RB Leipzig ===
In:

No.	Pos.	Nation	Player
—	FW	ENG	Ademola Lookman (loan from Everton)

Out:

No.	Pos.	Nation	Player
33	DF	GER	Marvin Compper (to Celtic)
38	FW	GER	Federico Palacios (to 1. FC Nürnberg)

=== Borussia Dortmund ===
In:

No.	Pos.	Nation	Player
16	DF	SUI	Manuel Akanji (from FC Basel)
34	FW	ESP	Sergio Gómez (from FC Barcelona B)
44	FW	BEL	Michy Batshuayi (on loan from Chelsea)

Out:

No.	Pos.	Nation	Player
4	DF	SRB	Neven Subotić (to AS Saint-Étienne)
5	DF	ESP	Marc Bartra (to Real Betis)
17	FW	GAB	Pierre-Emerick Aubameyang (to Arsenal)
34	MF	DEN	Jacob Bruun Larsen (on loan to VfB Stuttgart)

=== 1899 Hoffenheim ===
In:

No.	Pos.	Nation	Player

Out:

No.	Pos.	Nation	Player
--	MF	TUR	Barış Atik (on loan to SV Darmstadt 98)
--	FW	CRO	Antonio Čolak (on loan to HNK Rijeka)
14	FW	GER	Sandro Wagner (to FC Bayern Munich)
30	MF	GER	Philipp Ochs (on loan to VfL Bochum)

=== 1. FC Köln ===
In:

No.	Pos.	Nation	Player
9	FW	GER	Simon Terodde (from VfB Stuttgart)
41	MF	FRA	Vincent Koziello (from OGC Nice)

Out:

No.	Pos.	Nation	Player
34	DF	RUS	Konstantin Rausch (to FC Dynamo Moscow)

=== Hertha BSC ===
In:

No.	Pos.	Nation	Player

Out:

No.	Pos.	Nation	Player
14	MF	SUI	Valentin Stocker (to FC Basel)
15	DF	GER	Sebastian Langkamp (to Werder Bremen)
24	MF	JPN	Genki Haraguchi (on loan to Fortuna Düsseldorf)

=== SC Freiburg ===
In:

No.	Pos.	Nation	Player
9	FW	GER	Lucas Höler (from SV Sandhausen)
14	DF	GER	Patrick Kammerbauer (from 1. FC Nürnberg)
26	DF	FRA	Gaëtan Bussmann (on loan from Mainz 05)

Out:

No.	Pos.	Nation	Player
11	MF	TUR	Onur Bulut (to Eintracht Braunschweig)
14	MF	ENG	Ryan Kent (loan return to Liverpool F.C.)

=== Werder Bremen ===
In:

No.	Pos.	Nation	Player
11	MF	KOS	Milot Rashica (from SBV Vitesse)
15	DF	GER	Sebastian Langkamp (from Hertha BSC)
32	DF	AUT	Marco Friedl (on loan from FC Bayern Munich)

Out:

No.	Pos.	Nation	Player
15	MF	BIH	Izet Hajrović (to Dinamo Zagreb)
20	DF	SUI	Ulisses Garcia (on loan to 1. FC Nürnberg)

=== Borussia Mönchengladbach ===
In:

No.	Pos.	Nation	Player
3	DF	ENG	Reece Oxford (on loan from West Ham United F.C.)

Out:

No.	Pos.	Nation	Player
3	DF	ENG	Reece Oxford (loan return to West Ham United F.C.)
39	FW	AUS	Kwame Yeboah (on loan to SC Paderborn 07)

=== FC Schalke 04 ===
In:

No.	Pos.	Nation	Player
14	DF	GHA	Baba Rahman (on loan from Chelsea F.C.)
22	FW	CRO	Marko Pjaca (on loan from Juventus FC)
23	FW	GER	Cedric Teuchert (from 1. FC Nürnberg)

Out:

No.	Pos.	Nation	Player
16	FW	GER	Fabian Reese (on loan to SpVgg Greuther Fürth)
23	DF	ESP	Coke (on loan to Levante)
33	FW	KOS	Donis Avdijaj (on loan to Roda JC Kerkrade)

=== Eintracht Frankfurt ===
In:

No.	Pos.	Nation	Player
42	MF	BIH	Marijan Ćavar (from Zrinjski Mostar)

Out:

No.	Pos.	Nation	Player
18	MF	GER	Max Besuschkow (on loan to Holstein Kiel)
25	MF	SRB	Slobodan Medojević (to SV Darmstadt 98)
29	DF	ECU	Anderson Ordóñez (to LDU Quito)

=== Bayer 04 Leverkusen ===
In:

No.	Pos.	Nation	Player

Out:

No.	Pos.	Nation	Player
2	DF	BRA	André Ramalho (to Red Bull Salzburg)
14	FW	SUI	Admir Mehmedi (to VfL Wolfsburg)

=== FC Augsburg ===
In:

No.	Pos.	Nation	Player

Out:

No.	Pos.	Nation	Player
3	DF	GRE	Kostas Stafylidis (on loan to Stoke City F.C.)
5	MF	GER	Moritz Leitner (on loan to Norwich City F.C.)
15	DF	GER	Marvin Friedrich (to 1. FC Union Berlin)
18	DF	GER	Jan-Ingwer Callsen-Bracker (on loan to 1.FC Kaiserslautern)
22	FW	KOR	Ji Dong-won (on loan to SV Darmstadt 98)
26	MF	GER	Erik Thommy (to VfB Stuttgart)
28	DF	AUT	Georg Teigl (on loan to Eintracht Braunschweig)
40	DF	GER	Tim Rieder (on loan to Śląsk Wrocław)

=== Hamburger SV ===
In:

No.	Pos.	Nation	Player

Out:

No.	Pos.	Nation	Player

=== 1. FSV Mainz 05 ===
In:

No.	Pos.	Nation	Player
5	MF	NED	Nigel de Jong (from Galatasaray S.K.)
20	FW	NGA	Anthony Ujah (from Liaoning Whowin F.C.)

Out:

No.	Pos.	Nation	Player
14	FW	DEN	Viktor Fischer (to FC Copenhagen)
17	MF	ESP	Jairo (to UD Las Palmas)
20	MF	SUI	Fabian Frei (to FC Basel)
24	DF	FRA	Gaëtan Bussmann (on loan to SC Freiburg)
28	MF	GER	Philipp Klement (to SC Paderborn 07)
33	GK	GER	Jannik Huth (on loan to Sparta Rotterdam)

=== VfL Wolfsburg ===
In:

No.	Pos.	Nation	Player
8	MF	SUI	Renato Steffen (from FC Basel)
21	FW	CRO	Josip Brekalo (loan return from VfB Stuttgart)
22	FW	SUI	Admir Mehmedi (from Bayer Leverkusen)

Out:

No.	Pos.	Nation	Player
7	MF	FRA	Paul-Georges Ntep (on loan to AS Saint-Étienne)
32	FW	ENG	Kaylen Hinds (on loan to Greuther Fürth)
33	FW	GER	Mario Gómez (to VfB Stuttgart)
34	MF	GER	Marvin Stefaniak (on loan to 1. FC Nürnberg)

=== VfB Stuttgart ===
In:

No.	Pos.	Nation	Player
17	MF	GER	Erik Thommy (from FC Augsburg)
27	FW	GER	Mario Gómez (from VfL Wolfsburg)
34	MF	DEN	Jacob Bruun Larsen (on loan from Borussia Dortmund)

Out:

No.	Pos.	Nation	Player
7	FW	CRO	Josip Brekalo (loan return to VfL Wolfsburg)
8	MF	SUI	Anto Grgić (on loan to FC Sion)
9	FW	GER	Simon Terodde (to 1. FC Köln)
29	DF	BRA	Ailton (on loan to Estoril Praia)

=== Hannover 96 ===
In:

No.	Pos.	Nation	Player
2	DF	CRO	Josip Elez (on loan from HNK Rijeka)

Out:

No.	Pos.	Nation	Player
17	FW	DEN	Uffe Bech (on loan to Greuther Fürth)
28	MF	GER	Mike-Steven Bähre (on loan to SV Meppen)
30	GK	AUT	Samuel Şahin-Radlinger (on loan to SK Brann)

== 2. Bundesliga ==
=== FC Ingolstadt 04 ===
In:

No.	Pos.	Nation	Player
2	DF	GER	Frederic Ananou (from Roda JC Kerkrade)
7	FW	GER	Patrick Ebert (free agent)

Out:

No.	Pos.	Nation	Player
7	FW	CRO	Antonio Čolak (loan return to 1899 Hoffenheim)
18	DF	FRA	Romain Brégerie (on loan to SV Darmstadt 98)
31	MF	GER	Maurice Multhaup (to 1. FC Heidenheim)
36	FW	ITA	Gianluca Rizzo (to Borussia Dortmund II)

=== SV Darmstadt 98 ===
In:

No.	Pos.	Nation	Player
3	DF	TRI	Joevin Jones (from Seattle Sounders FC)
5	MF	SRB	Slobodan Medojević (from Eintracht Frankfurt)
9	FW	KOR	Ji Dong-won (on loan from FC Augsburg)
28	MF	TUR	Barış Atik (on loan from 1899 Hoffenheim)
33	DF	FRA	Romain Brégerie (on loan from FC Ingolstadt 04)

Out:

No.	Pos.	Nation	Player
7	DF	CHN	Hu Ruibao (loan return to Vejle Boldklub)
9	FW	AUS	Jamie Maclaren (on loan to Hibernian F.C.)
14	FW	SVN	Roman Bezjak (to Jagiellonia Białystok)
26	DF	DEN	Patrick Banggaard (on loan to Roda JC Kerkrade)
34	MF	TUR	Hamit Altintop (released)

=== Eintracht Braunschweig ===
In:

No.	Pos.	Nation	Player
3	DF	DEN	Frederik Tingager (from Odense Boldklub)
8	FW	GER	Philipp Hofmann (from SpVgg Greuther Fürth)
18	DF	AUT	Georg Teigl (on loan from FC Augsburg)
25	MF	TUR	Onur Bulut (from SC Freiburg)

Out:

No.	Pos.	Nation	Player
23	MF	GER	Onel Hernández (to Norwich City F.C.)
34	FW	GER	Phillip Tietz (to SC Paderborn 07)

=== 1. FC Union Berlin ===
In:

No.	Pos.	Nation	Player
4	MF	GER	Lars Dietz (from Borussia Dortmund II)
5	DF	GER	Marvin Friedrich (from FC Augsburg)

Out:

No.	Pos.	Nation	Player
2	DF	JPN	Atsuto Uchida (to Kashima Antlers)

=== Dynamo Dresden ===
In:

No.	Pos.	Nation	Player
27	FW	SEN	Moussa Koné (from FC Zürich)
28	DF	GER	Marcel Franke (on loan from Norwich City)

Out:

No.	Pos.	Nation	Player
21	FW	FIN	Eero Markkanen (loan return to AIK Fotboll)
34	MF	GER	Justin Löwe (on loan to FC Oberlausitz Neugersdorf)
39	DF	GER	Noah Awassi (to FSV Union Fürstenwalde)

=== 1. FC Heidenheim ===
In:

No.	Pos.	Nation	Player
4	DF	GER	Oliver Steurer (from Borussia Dortmund II)
17	MF	GER	Maurice Multhaup (from FC Ingolstadt 04)

Out:

No.	Pos.	Nation	Player
12	MF	AUS	Ben Halloran (to V-Varen Nagasaki)

=== FC St. Pauli ===
In:

No.	Pos.	Nation	Player
42	MF	BEL	Thibaud Verlinden (on loan from Stoke City F.C.)
45	FW	GRE	Dimitrios Diamantakos (from VfL Bochum)

Out:

No.	Pos.	Nation	Player

=== SpVgg Greuther Fürth ===
In:

No.	Pos.	Nation	Player
17	FW	GER	Fabian Reese (on loan from FC Schalke 04)
--	FW	DEN	Uffe Bech (on loan from Hannover 96)
--	FW	ENG	Kaylen Hinds (on loan from VfL Wolfsburg)

Out:

No.	Pos.	Nation	Player
2	DF	GER	Stephen Sama (on loan to VfL Osnabrück)
11	FW	GER	Philipp Hofmann (to Eintracht Braunschweig)
17	MF	ESP	Manuel Torres (to AEL Limassol)

=== VfL Bochum ===
In:

No.	Pos.	Nation	Player
4	DF	GER	Simon Lorenz (from 1899 Hoffenheim II)
11	FW	GER	Janni Serra (on loan from Borussia Dortmund II)
14	MF	GER	Philipp Ochs (on loan from 1899 Hoffenheim)

Out:

No.	Pos.	Nation	Player
5	DF	GER	Felix Bastians (to Tianjin TEDA F.C.)
11	FW	GRE	Dimitrios Diamantakos (to FC St. Pauli)
15	MF	KAZ	Alexander Merkel (to FC Admira Wacker Mödling)
27	DF	GER	Nico Rieble (to F.C. Hansa Rostock)
34	FW	GRE	Vangelis Pavlidis (on loan to Borussia Dortmund II)

=== SV Sandhausen ===
In:

No.	Pos.	Nation	Player
9	MF	ISL	Rúrik Gíslason (from 1. FC Nürnberg)

Out:

No.	Pos.	Nation	Player
9	FW	GER	Lucas Höler (to SC Freiburg)

=== Fortuna Düsseldorf ===
In:

No.	Pos.	Nation	Player
25	MF	JPN	Genki Haraguchi (on loan from Hertha BSC)
--	DF	SEN	Jean Ndecky (from Casa Sports)

Out:

No.	Pos.	Nation	Player

=== 1. FC Nürnberg ===
In:

No.	Pos.	Nation	Player
3	DF	SUI	Ulisses Garcia (on loan from Werder Bremen)
15	MF	GER	Marvin Stefaniak (on loan from VfL Wolfsburg)
21	FW	GER	Federico Palacios (from RB Leipzig)

Out:

No.	Pos.	Nation	Player
19	MF	ISL	Rúrik Gíslason (to SV Sandhausen)
36	FW	GER	Cedric Teuchert (to FC Schalke 04)
39	DF	GER	Patrick Kammerbauer (to SC Freiburg)

=== 1. FC Kaiserslautern ===
In:

No.	Pos.	Nation	Player
5	MF	TUR	Halil Altintop (from SK Slavia Prague)
11	MF	NOR	Ruben Yttergård Jenssen (on loan from FC Groningen)
23	DF	GER	Jan-Ingwer Callsen-Bracker (on loan from FC Augsburg)

Out:

No.	Pos.	Nation	Player
23	MF	TUR	Barış Atik (loan return to 1899 Hoffenheim)

=== Erzgebirge Aue ===
In:

No.	Pos.	Nation	Player
22	FW	COD	Ridge Munsy (on loan from Grasshopper Club Zürich)

Out:

No.	Pos.	Nation	Player
9	MF	GER	Arianit Ferati (loan return to Hamburger SV II)
11	MF	CUW	Michaël Maria (to FC Twente)

=== Arminia Bielefeld ===
In:

No.	Pos.	Nation	Player

Out:

No.	Pos.	Nation	Player
8	FW	SVN	Andraž Šporar (loan return to FC Basel)

=== MSV Duisburg ===
In:

No.	Pos.	Nation	Player
30	MF	AUT	Christian Gartner (free agent)

Out:

No.	Pos.	Nation	Player
2	MF	USA	Mael Corboz (to SG Wattenscheid 09)
8	MF	GER	Thomas Bröker (to SC Fortuna Köln)
9	FW	GER	Simon Brandstetter (to SV Wehen Wiesbaden)

=== Holstein Kiel ===
In:

No.	Pos.	Nation	Player
--	MF	GER	Max Besuschkow (on loan from Eintracht Frankfurt)

Out:

No.	Pos.	Nation	Player
25	FW	GER	Utku Sen (on loan to VfL Osnabrück)
33	FW	KOS	Ilir Azemi (to Wacker Nordhausen)

=== Jahn Regensburg ===
In:

No.	Pos.	Nation	Player
25	FW	GER	Hamadi Al Ghaddioui (from Sportfreunde Lotte)

Out:

No.	Pos.	Nation	Player
19	FW	CRO	Patrik Džalto (to TuS Koblenz)
30	MF	GER	Johannes Stingl (to FC Augsburg II)

== See also ==
- 2017–18 Bundesliga
- 2017–18 2. Bundesliga
