= 1/2 Revolution =

2011 documentary film

1/2 Revolution is a 2011 documentary film about the 2011 Egyptian revolution.

== Production ==
The documentary was filmed by Egyptian-Danish filmmaker Omar Shargawi and Egyptian-Swedish filmmaker Karim El-Hakim. Shargawi had arrived in Cairo on January 24, 2011, the day before the revolution began. He and El-Hakim shot footage of the revolution using handheld cameras and mobile phones. The film was edited from over 100 hours of footage filmed on the streets of Cairo and in El-Hakim's home. The name "1/2 Revolution" references the fact that the filmmakers were both half-Arab, only filmed half of the revolution, and that they felt the revolution was only partially successful.

== Reception ==
The film received positive reviews from critics at the time of its release. Eric Kohn of IndieWire gave it an "A" grade. Justin Lowe, writing for the Hollywood Reporter, praised its editing, cinéma vérité style and immediacy. Alissa Simon praised the documentary's production quality and compared it to an "indie action thriller.
