= Jannik Müller =

German footballer

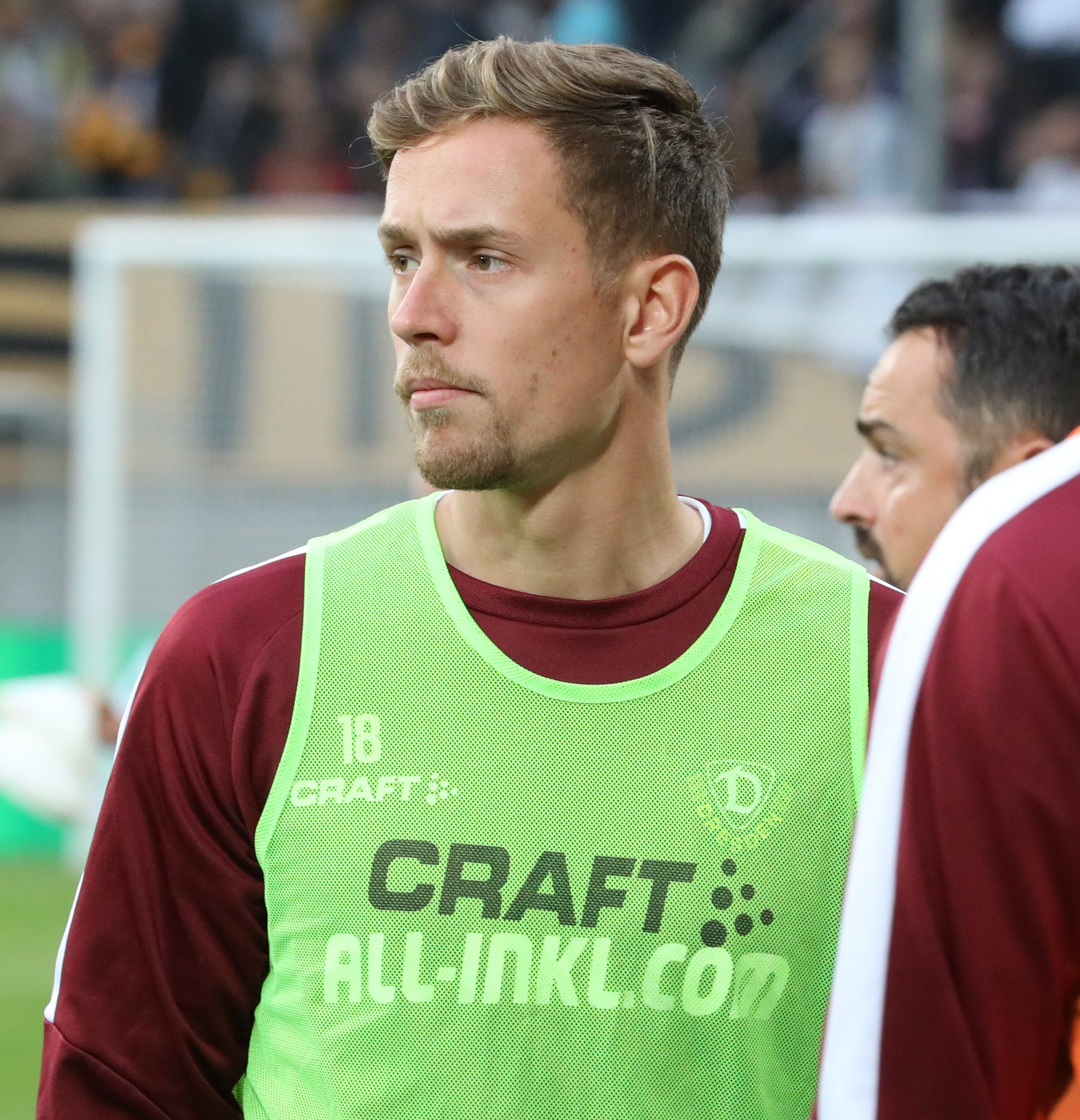
- Müller with Dynamo Dresden in 2019

Personal information
- Date of birth: 18 January 1994 (age 32)
- Place of birth: Adenau, Germany
- Height: 1.87 m (6 ft 2 in)
- Position: Defender

Team information
- Current team: VfL Osnabrück
- Number: 24

Youth career
- 2012–2013: 1. FC Köln

Senior career*
Years	Team	Apps	(Gls)
2012–2014	1. FC Köln II	25	(0)
2014–2020	Dynamo Dresden	128	(6)
2020–2021	DAC Dunajská Streda	27	(0)
2021–2024	Darmstadt 98	58	(2)
2025–	VfL Osnabrück	52	(2)

International career
2013	Germany U19	2	(0)
- * Club domestic league appearances and goals as of 28 May 2026

Jannik Müller (born 18 January 1994) is a German professional footballer who plays as a defender for 2. Bundesliga club VfL Osnabrück.

== Club career ==
On 2 January 2025, Müller signed with VfL Osnabrück in 3. Liga.

== International career ==
Müller was a German youth international at the U19 level.

== Career statistics ==
As of match played 1 July 2021

Appearances and goals by club, season and competition
Club	Season	League			National cup (Note: Includes DFB-Pokal, Slovak Cup)		Continental		Total	
Club	Season	Division	Apps	Goals	Apps	Goals	Apps	Goals	Apps	Goals
1. FC Köln II	2012–13	Regionalliga West	10	0	—		—		10	
1. FC Köln II	2013–14	Regionalliga West	15	0	—		—		15	0
1. FC Köln II	Total		25	0	—		—		25	0
Dynamo Dresden	2014–15	3. Liga	28	1	2	0	—		30	1
Dynamo Dresden	2015–16	3. Liga	16	0	—		—		16	0
Dynamo Dresden	2016–17	2. Bundesliga	27	4	1	0	—		28	4
Dynamo Dresden	2017–18	2. Bundesliga	24	0	1	0	—		25	0
Dynamo Dresden	2018–19	2. Bundesliga	17	1	0	0	—		17	1
Dynamo Dresden	2019–20	2. Bundesliga	24	0	2	0	—		26	0
Dynamo Dresden	Total		136	6	6	0	0	0	142	6
DAC Dunajská Streda	2020–21	Slovak Super Liga	27	0	2	1	3 (Note: Appearances in UEFA Europa League)	0	32	1
Career total			188	6	8	1	3	0	199	7

== Honours ==
VfL Osnabrück

- 3. Liga: 2025–26
