= Lucas Röser =

German footballer

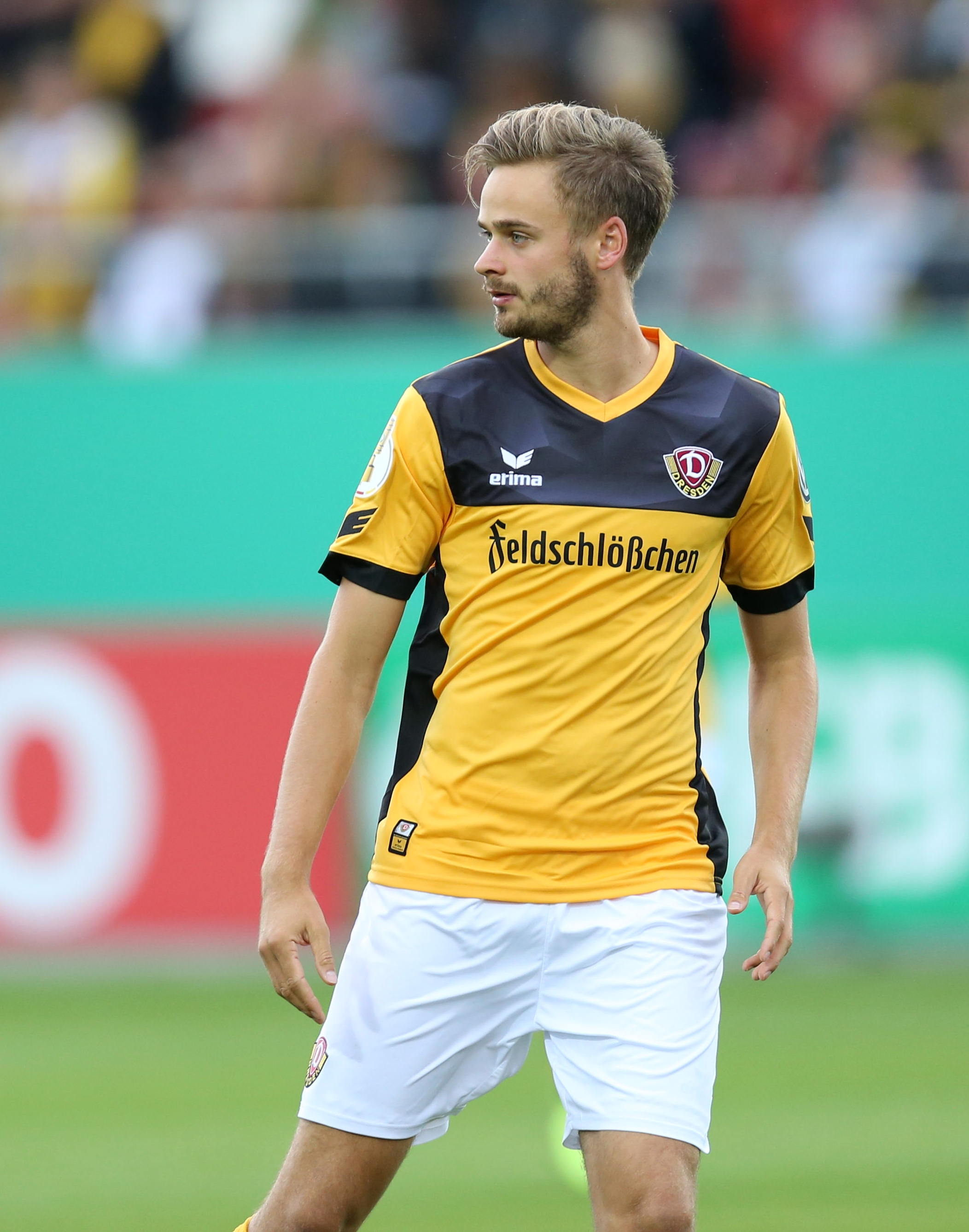
- Röser with Dynamo Dresden in 2019

Personal information
- Date of birth: 28 December 1993 (age 32)
- Place of birth: Ludwigshafen, Germany
- Height: 1.84 m (6 ft 0 in)
- Position: Forward

Team information
- Current team: SSV Ulm
- Number: 9

Youth career
- –2008: Ludwigshafener SC
- 2008–2012: Mainz 05

Senior career*
Years	Team	Apps	(Gls)
2011–2013	Mainz 05 II	51	(9)
2014–2016	1899 Hoffenheim II	72	(19)
2016–2017	Sonnenhof Großaspach	34	(14)
2017–2019	Dynamo Dresden	53	(13)
2019–2022	1. FC Kaiserslautern	31	(3)
2021	→ Türkgücü München (loan)	19	(4)
2022–	SSV Ulm	124	(25)
- * Club domestic league appearances and goals as of 24 September 2026

Lucas Röser (born 28 December 1993) is a German professional footballer who plays as a forward for SSV Ulm.

== Career statistics ==
As of match played on 1 July 2020

Appearances and goals by club, season and competition
Club	Season	League			Cup (Note: Includes the Württemberg Cup and DFB-Pokal)		Total	
Club	Season	Division	Apps	Goals	Apps	Goals	Apps	Goals
Mainz 05 II	2011–12	Regionalliga West	2	1	—		2	1
Mainz 05 II	2012–13	Regionalliga Südwest	33	8	—		33	8
Mainz 05 II	2013–14	Regionalliga Südwest	16	0	—		16	0
Mainz 05 II	Total		51	9	—		51	9
1899 Hoffenheim II	2013–14	Regionalliga Südwest	14	5	—		14	5
1899 Hoffenheim II	2014–15	Regionalliga Südwest	32	8	—		32	8
1899 Hoffenheim II	2015–16	Regionalliga Südwest	25	6	—		25	6
1899 Hoffenheim II	Total		71	19	—		71	19
Sonnenhof Großaspach	2016–17	3. Liga	34	14	2	0	36	14
Dynamo Dresden	2017–18	2. Bundesliga	28	9	2	0	30	9
Dynamo Dresden	2018–19	2. Bundesliga	23	4	1	0	24	4
Dynamo Dresden	2019–20	2. Bundesliga	2	0	1	1	3	1
Dynamo Dresden	Total		53	13	4	1	57	14
1. FC Kaiserslautern	2019–20	3. Liga	27	3	2	0	29	0
Career total			236	58	8	1	244	59
