= Luka Štor =

Slovenian footballer (born 1998)

Personal information
- Date of birth: 5 July 1998 (age 28)
- Place of birth: Šempeter pri Gorici, Slovenia
- Height: 1.78 m (5 ft 10 in)
- Position: Forward

Team information
- Current team: Ironi Modi'in
- Number: 9

Youth career
- 2003–2008: Primorje
- 2008–2013: Gorica
- 2013–2017: Maribor

Senior career*
Years	Team	Apps	(Gls)
2017–2019	Maribor	0	(0)
2018	→ Aluminij (loan)	11	(0)
2019	Aluminij	19	(9)
2019–2022	Dynamo Dresden	27	(1)
2020	→ Aluminij (loan)	6	(0)
2021–2022	→ Apollon Limassol (loan)	7	(1)
2022–2024	Bravo	44	(9)
2024–2025	Maccabi Petah Tikva	25	(3)
2025	CF Intercity	7	(1)
2025–2026	Budućnost Podgorica	8	(0)
2026	Primorje	9	(0)
2026–	Ironi Modi'in	1	(0)

International career
2015–2016	Slovenia U18	8	(2)
2016	Slovenia U19	1	(0)
2019–2020	Slovenia U21	8	(0)
- * Club domestic league appearances and goals as of 22 August 2026

Luka Štor (born 5 July 1998) is a Slovenian footballer who plays as a forward for Israeli club Ironi Modi'in.

== Career ==
Štor made his professional debut for Aluminij in the Slovenian PrvaLiga on 20 February 2018, coming on as a substitute in the 70th minute for Ibrahim Mensah in a 1–1 away draw against Ankaran. In August 2019, he joined 2. Bundesliga club Dynamo Dresden.

On 31 January 2024, Štor signed for Israeli club Maccabi Petah Tikva. On 30 May 2024, he won his first title with the club, the 2023–24 Israel State Cup, after beating Hapoel Be'er Sheva 1–0 in the final.

== Honours ==
Maccabi Petah Tikva

- Israel State Cup: 2023–24
- Israel Super Cup runner-up: 2024
