= Jean Ndecky =

Senegalese footballer

Personal information
- Full name: Jean Jacques Idrissa Ndecky
- Date of birth: 10 January 1997 (age 29)
- Place of birth: Thionck Essyl, Senegal
- Height: 1.76 m (5 ft 9 in)
- Position: Right-back

Youth career
- Casa Sports

Senior career*
Years	Team	Apps	(Gls)
2015–2018	Casa Sports		
2018–2021	Fortuna Düsseldorf II	0	(0)
2019–2020	→ Skënderbeu (loan)	15	(1)

International career
2017	Senegal U20	10	(1)
2017	Senegal	1	(0)
- * Club domestic league appearances and goals

Jean Jacques Idrissa Ndecky (born 10 January 1997) is a Senegalese professional footballer who plays as a right-back.
