= Fabian Müller =

German footballer

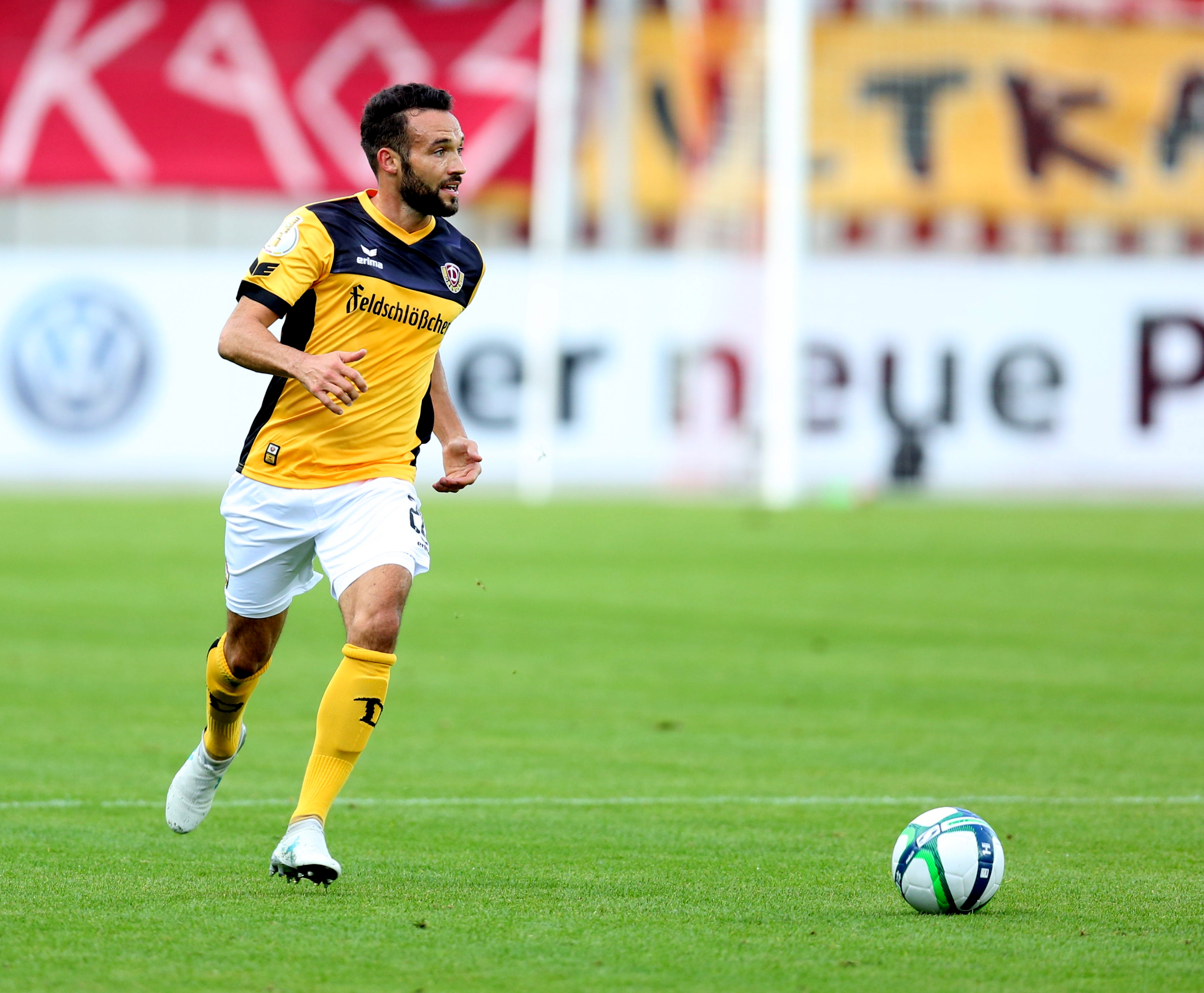
- Müller with Dynamo Dresden in 2017

Personal information
- Date of birth: 6 November 1986 (age 39)
- Place of birth: Bad Reichenhall, West Germany
- Height: 1.73 m (5 ft 8 in)
- Position: Left-back

Team information
- Current team: FC Pipinsried
- Number: 2

Youth career
- 1999–2004: Bayern Munich

Senior career*
Years	Team	Apps	(Gls)
2004–2007	Bayern Munich II	62	(2)
2007–2009	Erzgebirge Aue	39	(2)
2009–2010	1. FC Kaiserslautern	10	(0)
2010–2015	Erzgebirge Aue	138	(8)
2015–2018	Dynamo Dresden	67	(0)
2018–2019	Chemnitzer FC	8	(0)
2019–	FC Pipinsried	14	(0)

International career^{‡}
2002–2003	Germany U16	7	(0)
2005	Germany U20	2	(0)
- * Club domestic league appearances and goals as of 00:00, 4 August 2018 (UTC) ‡ National team caps and goals as of 28 January 2017

Fabian Müller (born 6 November 1986) is a German footballer who plays for FC Pipinsried as a left-back.

== Career ==
On 27 May 2010, Müller returned after one year with 1. FC Kaiserslautern to his former club Erzgebirge Aue.

Müller is a youth international for Germany.

== Honours ==
FC Bayern Munich II

- IFA Shield: 2005
