= Marcel Franke =

German footballer

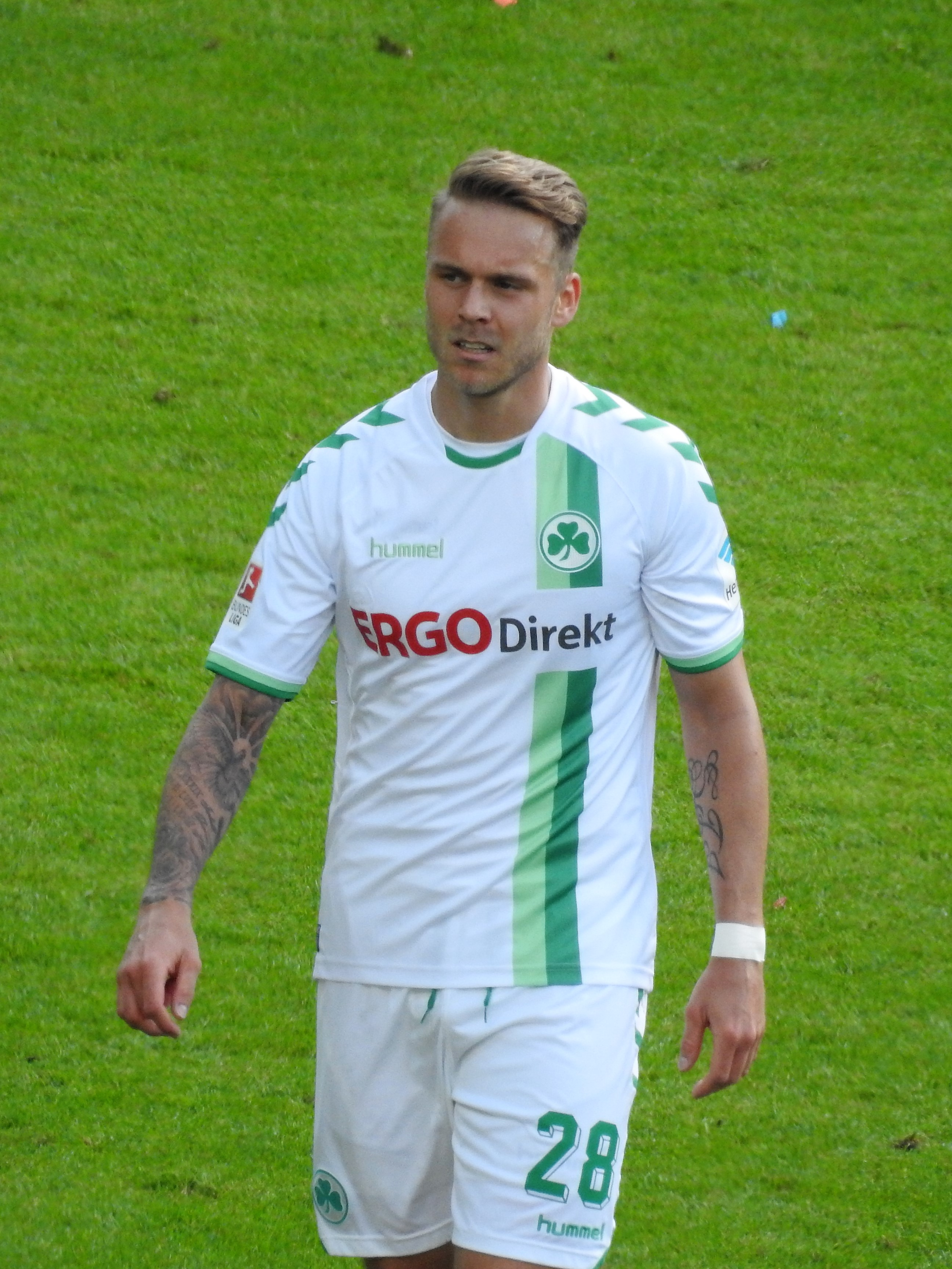
- Franke in 2017

Personal information
- Date of birth: 5 April 1993 (age 33)
- Place of birth: Dresden, Germany
- Position: Centre-back

Team information
- Current team: Karlsruher SC
- Number: 28

Youth career
- 1998–2010: Dynamo Dresden

Senior career*
Years	Team	Apps	(Gls)
2010–2013	Dynamo Dresden II	36	(4)
2010–2013	Dynamo Dresden	8	(0)
2013–2015	Hallescher FC	68	(6)
2015–2017	Greuther Fürth	53	(2)
2017–2019	Norwich City	5	(0)
2018	→ Dynamo Dresden (loan)	16	(0)
2018–2019	→ Darmstadt 98 (loan)	25	(2)
2019–2022	Hannover 96	74	(0)
2022–	Karlsruher SC	120	(6)
- * Club domestic league appearances and goals as of 18 May 2026

Marcel Franke (born 5 April 1993) is a German professional footballer who plays as a centre-back for Karlsruher SC since 2022.

== Career ==
Franke is a product of Dynamo Dresden's youth setup, and was promoted to the first team in 2010. He made his debut in March 2011, when he replaced Sascha Pfeffer in a 3. Liga match against SV Wehen Wiesbaden. In Summer 2013 he was signed for Hallescher FC by former Dynamo Dresden coach Sven Köhler.

In July 2017, he signed for Norwich City on a three-year contract, for an undisclosed fee. He made his debut for them in the opening game of the 2017–18 season, a 1–1 draw with Fulham, playing at centre half along with fellow debutant Christoph Zimmermann. He played in the first seven games of the season (five in the Championship and two in the EFL Cup) but was dropped after a 4–0 defeat at Millwall, with Timm Klose having returned from injury and the club signing Grant Hanley. Although he came on as a late substitute for Klose in a 3–1 win over Brentford in the EFL Cup in September, it was announced in December that he would be returning to Dynamo Dresden on loan in the January transfer window for the remainder of the season.

On 27 June 2018, Franke joined SV Darmstadt 98 on a season-long loan. On 26 June 2019, Norwich City announced that Franke had joined Hannover 96.

Ahead of the 2022–23 season, Franke joined Karlsruher SC on a three-year contract.

== Career statistics ==
As of match played 30 December 2017

Appearances and goals by club, season and competition
Club	Season	League			National Cup		League Cup		Other		Total	
Club	Season	Division	Apps	Goals	Apps	Goals	Apps	Goals	Apps	Goals	Apps	Goals
Dynamo Dresden	2010–11	3. Liga	6	0	0	0	—		—		6	0
Dynamo Dresden	2011–12	2. Bundesliga	0	0	0	0	—		—		0	0
Dynamo Dresden	2012–13	2. Bundesliga	2	0	0	0	—		—		2	0
Dynamo Dresden	Total		8	0	0	0	—		—		8	0
Hallescher FC	2013–14	3. Liga	36	2	0	0	—		—		36	2
Hallescher FC	2014–15	3. Liga	32	4	0	0	—		—		32	4
Hallescher FC	Total		68	6	0	0	—		—		68	6
Greuther Fürth	2015–16	2. Bundesliga	22	0	1	0	—		—		23	0
Greuther Fürth	2016–17	2. Bundesliga	31	2	3	0	—		—		34	2
Greuther Fürth	Total		53	2	4	0	—		—		57	2
Norwich City	2017–18	Championship	5	0	0	0	3	0	0	0	8	0
Dynamo Dresden (loan)	2017–18	2. Bundesliga	16	0	—		—		—		16	0
Career total			150	8	4	0	3	0	0	0	158	8
