= Noah Awassi =

German footballer

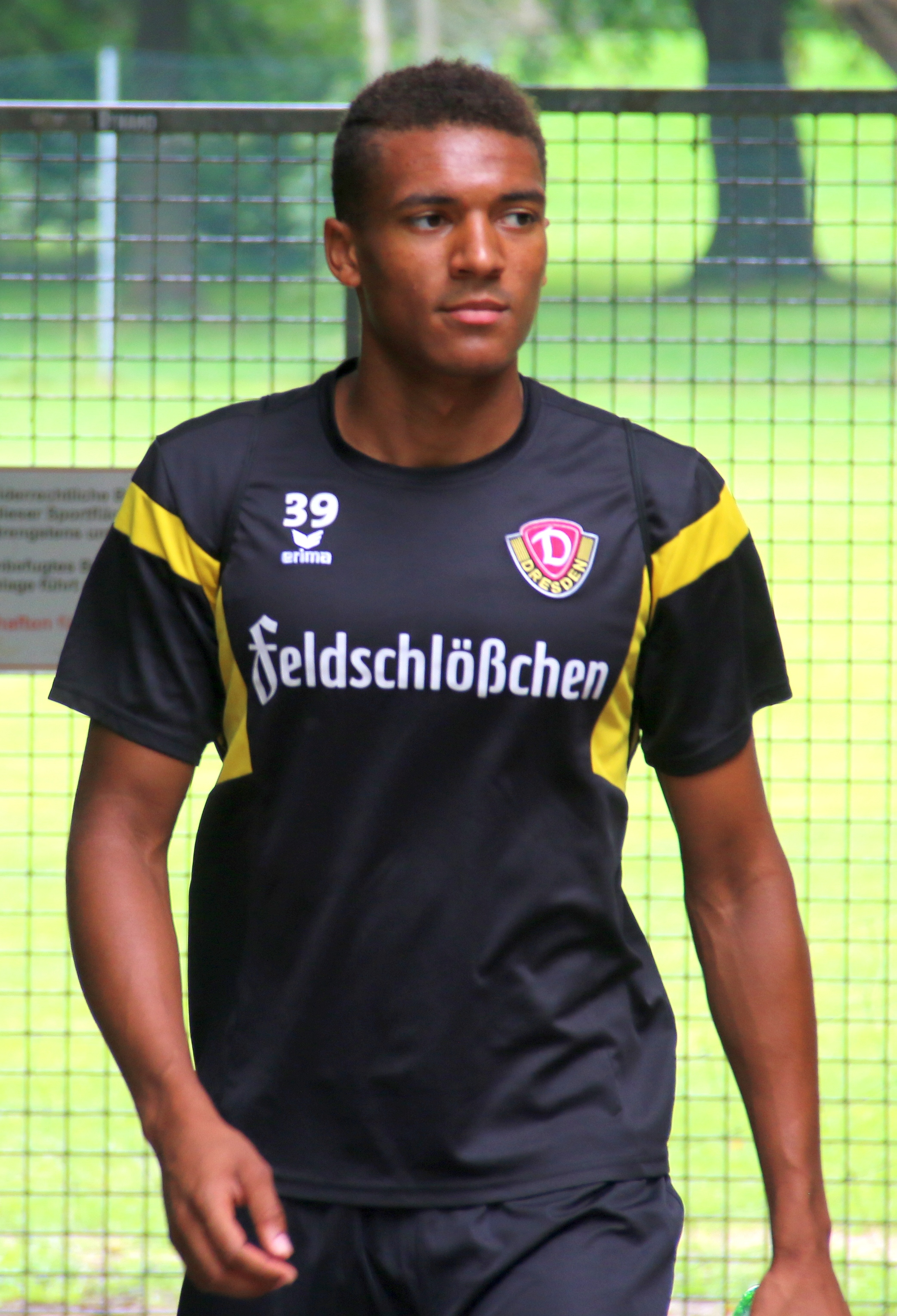
- Awassi in 2016

Personal information
- Full name: Noah Montheo Awassi
- Date of birth: 10 March 1998 (age 28)
- Place of birth: Dresden, Germany
- Height: 1.93 m (6 ft 4 in)
- Position: Centre-back

Team information
- Current team: Eintracht Trier
- Number: 26

Youth career
- 2004–2017: Dynamo Dresden

Senior career*
Years	Team	Apps	(Gls)
2017–2018	Dynamo Dresden	0	(0)
2018	Union Fürstenwalde	14	(1)
2018–2019	Sportfreunde Lotte	3	(0)
2019–2020	SV Babelsberg 03	15	(0)
2020–2021	Schalke 04 II	29	(3)
2021–2022	Virton	2	(0)
2022	Dornbirn	12	(0)
2022–2024	FSV Frankfurt	63	(1)
2024–2025	Würzburger Kickers	17	(0)
2025–	Eintracht Trier	9	(0)
- * Club domestic league appearances and goals as of 26 June 2026

Noah Montheo Awassi (born 10 March 1998) is a German professional footballer who plays as a centre-back for Eintracht Trier.

== Club career ==
On 3 February 2022, Awassi signed with Dornbirn in Austria.
