= Osman Atılgan =

German-Turkish footballer

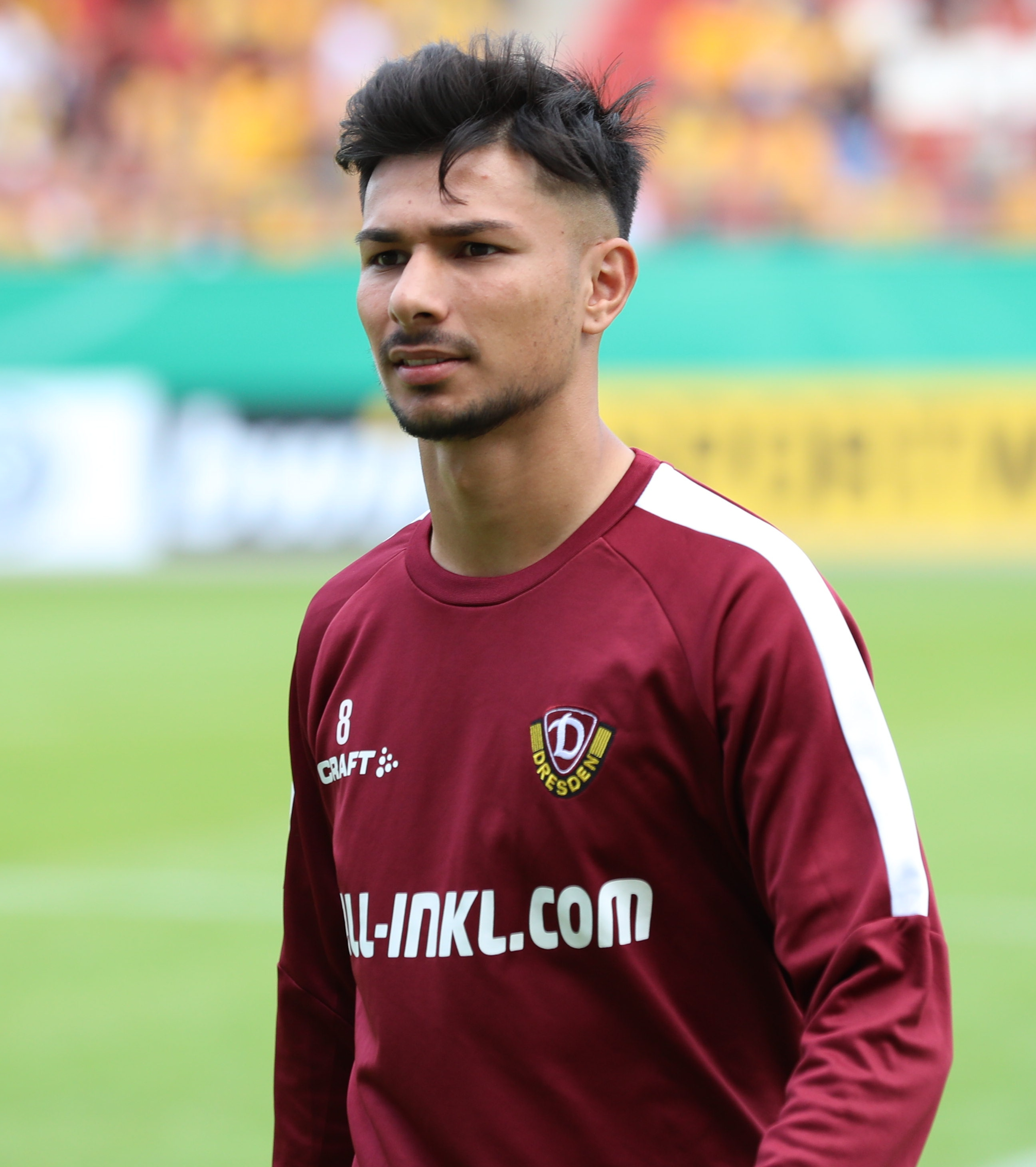
- Atılgan with Dynamo Dresden in 2019

Personal information
- Date of birth: 1 August 1999 (age 27)
- Place of birth: Nordenham, Germany
- Height: 1.80 m (5 ft 11 in)
- Position: Forward

Team information
- Current team: Hallescher FC
- Number: 10

Youth career
- TSV Abbehausen
- –2012: VfB Oldenburg
- 2012–2017: JFV Nordwest
- 2017–2018: Dynamo Dresden

Senior career*
Years	Team	Apps	(Gls)
2018–2020	Dynamo Dresden	10	(1)
2019–2020	→ Hansa Rostock (loan)	2	(0)
2020–2021	Preußen Münster	16	(1)
2021–2022	FC Rot-Weiß Koblenz	8	(0)
2022–2024	1. FC Lokomotive Leipzig	76	(22)
2024–2026	Greifswalder FC	46	(14)
2026–	Hallescher FC	6	(0)
- * Club domestic league appearances and goals as of 23 September 2026

Osman Atılgan (born 1 August 1999) is a German-Turkish professional footballer who plays as a forward for Hallescher FC.

== Career ==
Atılgan made his professional debut for Dynamo Dresden in the 2. Bundesliga on 23 December 2018, coming on as a substitute in the 69th minute for Barış Atik in the 3–1 away win against MSV Duisburg.

On 23 August 2019, Atılgan joined Hansa Rostock on a season-long loan deal.
