= Patrick Möschl =

Austrian footballer (born 1993)

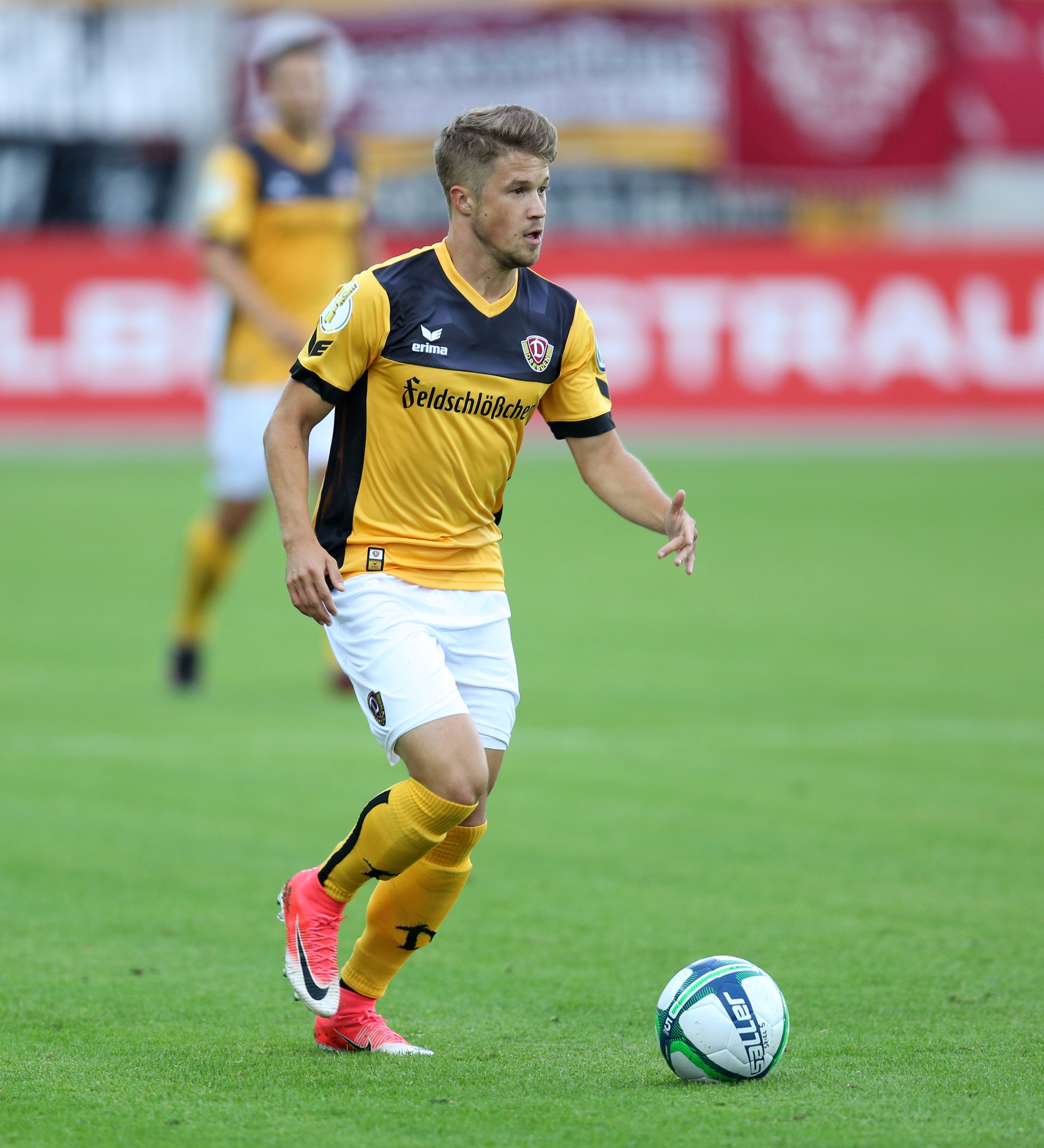
- Möschl with Dynamo Dresden in 2017

Personal information
- Date of birth: 6 March 1993 (age 33)
- Place of birth: Saalfelden, Austria
- Height: 1.73 m (5 ft 8 in)
- Positions: Right-back; right midfielder

Team information
- Current team: VfB Oldenburg
- Number: 17

Youth career
- 2001–2007: SK Lenzing
- 2007–2011: SV Ried

Senior career*
Years	Team	Apps	(Gls)
2012–2017	SV Ried	102	(14)
2017–2020	Dynamo Dresden	30	(1)
2020	1. FC Magdeburg	8	(0)
2021	SV Ried	9	(0)
2022–	VfB Oldenburg	84	(4)
- * Club domestic league appearances and goals as of 20 June 2026

Patrick Möschl (born 6 March 1993) is an Austrian professional footballer who plays as a right-back and right midfielder for VfB Oldenburg.

== Career ==
In June 2017, Möschl left SV Ried in his native Austria for German 2. Bundesliga side Dynamo Dresden, signing a two-year contract until 2019.

He moved to Regionalliga Nord club VfB Oldenburg as a free agent on 31 January 2022, the last day of the 2022 winter transfer window.

== Career statistics ==
As of match played 29 June 2026

Appearances and goals by club, season and competition
Club	Season	League			National cup		Other		Total	
Club	Season	Division	Apps	Goals	Apps	Goals	Apps	Goals	Apps	Goals
SV Ried	2012–13	Austrian Bundesliga	3	0	0	0	–		3	0
SV Ried	2013–14	Austrian Bundesliga	25	4	3	0	–		28	4
SV Ried	2014–15	Austrian Bundesliga	23	3	1	0	–		24	3
SV Ried	2015–16	Austrian Bundesliga	20	2	2	0	–		22	2
SV Ried	2016–17	Austrian Bundesliga	31	5	2	0	–		33	5
SV Ried	Total		102	14	8	0	0	0	110	14
Dynamo Dresden	2017–18	2. Bundesliga	11	1	1	0	–		12	1
Dynamo Dresden	2018–19	2. Bundesliga	15	0	1	0	–		16	0
Dynamo Dresden	2019–20	2. Bundesliga	4	0	1	0	–		5	0
Dynamo Dresden	Total		30	1	3	0	0	0	33	1
1. FC Magdeburg	2019–20	3. Liga	8	0	0	0	–		8	0
SV Ried	2020–21	Austrian Bundesliga	9	0	0	0	–		9	0
VfB Oldenburg	2021–22	Regionalliga Nord	5	0	–		–		5	0
VfB Oldenburg	2022–23	3. Liga	23	0	–		–		23	0
VfB Oldenburg	2023–24	Regionalliga Nord	29	0	–		–		29	0
VfB Oldenburg	2024–25	Regionalliga Nord	24	4	–		–		24	4
VfB Oldenburg	2025–26	Regionalliga Nord	3	0	0	0	–		3	0
VfB Oldenburg	Total		84	4	0	0	0	0	84	4
Career total			233	18	11	0	0	0	244	18
