= Florian Ballas =

German footballer

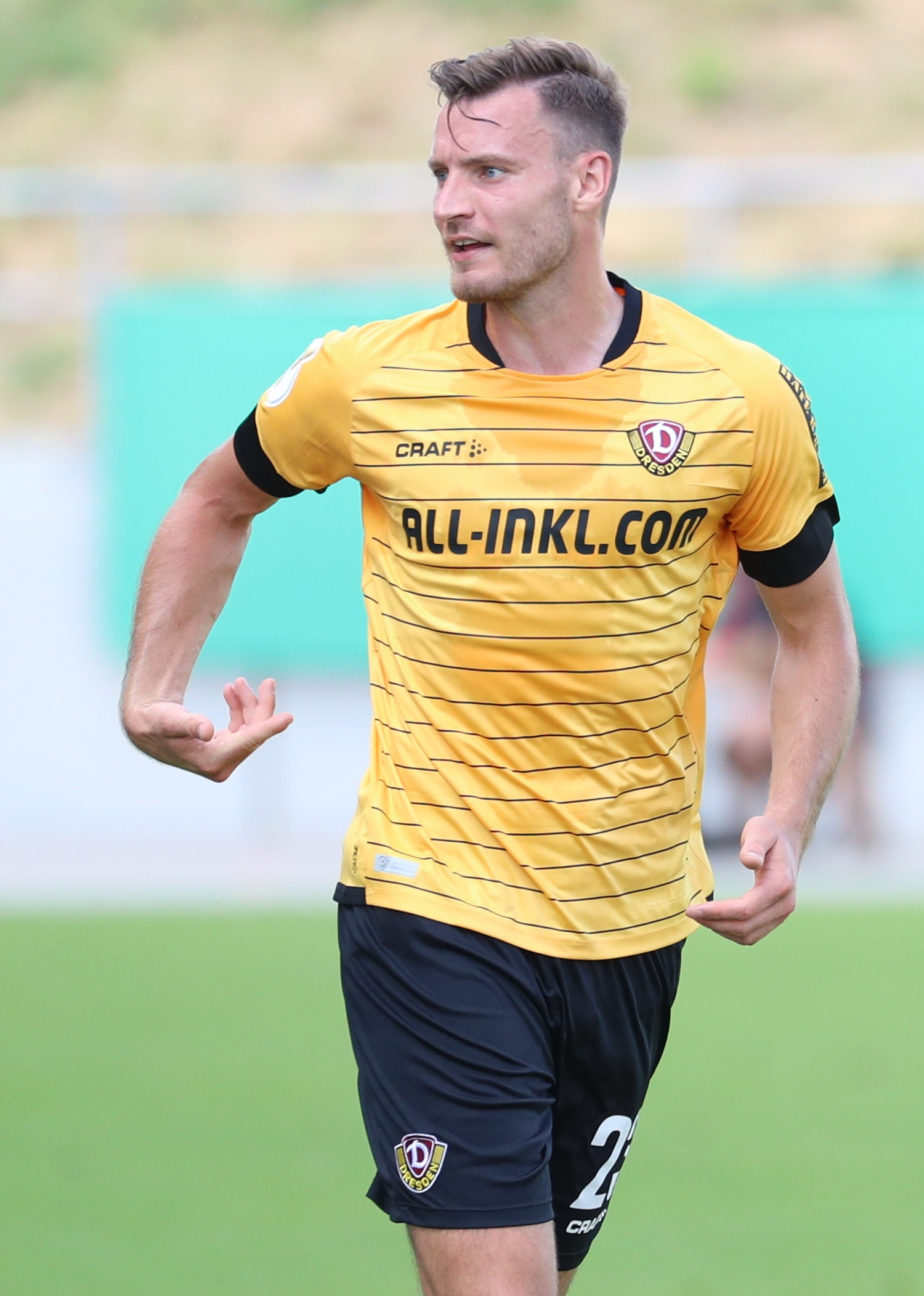
- Ballas with Dynamo Dresden in 2019

Personal information
- Date of birth: 8 January 1993 (age 33)
- Place of birth: Saarbrücken, Germany
- Height: 1.96 m (6 ft 5 in)
- Position: Centre-back

Team information
- Current team: Jeunesse Canach
- Number: 5

Youth career
- 1996–2003: SV Scheidt
- 1993–2009: 1. FC Saarbrücken
- 2009–2010: 1. FC Nürnberg
- 2010–2011: 1. FC Saarbrücken

Senior career*
Years	Team	Apps	(Gls)
2011–2013	1. FC Nürnberg II	40	(2)
2013–2015	Hannover 96 II	17	(0)
2013–2015	Hannover 96	0	(0)
2014	→ 1. FC Saarbrücken (loan)	16	(0)
2015–2016	FSV Frankfurt	34	(1)
2016–2020	Dynamo Dresden	100	(5)
2020–2022	Erzgebirge Aue	30	(1)
2022–2023	Karlsruher SC	9	(0)
2023–2025	Jahn Regensburg	41	(2)
2026	SGV Freiberg	4	(0)
2026–	Jeunesse Canach	0	(0)

International career
2011	Germany U19	1	(1)
- * Club domestic league appearances and goals as of 09:41, 21 May 2026 (UTC)

Florian Ballas (born 8 January 1993) is a German professional footballer who plays as a centre-back for Luxembourgish club Jeunesse Canach.

== Club career ==
In the summer of 2013, Ballas joined Hannover 96 from 1. FC Nürnberg. In January 2014, Ballas joined 3. Liga club 1. FC Saarbrücken on loan. In January 2015, Ballas signed for FSV Frankfurt from Hannover 96. In June 2016, Ballas left FSV Frankfurt, signing a three-year contract with Dynamo Dresden. In March 2018, he extended his contract with Dresden by a further two years.

Following the expiry of Ballas' contract in the summer of 2020, he joined 2. Bundesliga team Erzgebirge Aue on a two-year contract.

== International career ==
Ballas is a one-time youth international for Germany, at the U19 level.
