= Justin Löwe =

German footballer (born 1998)

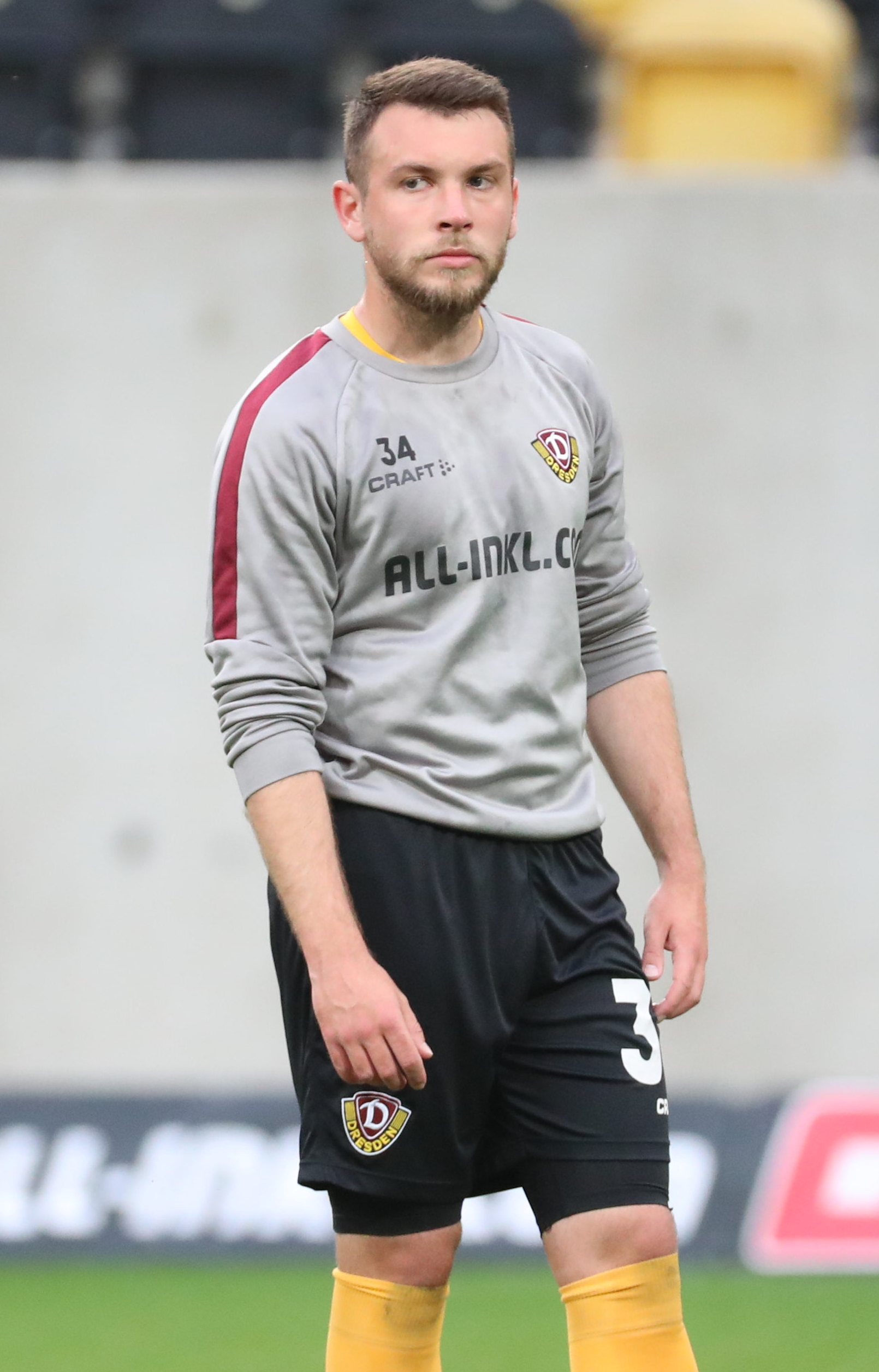
- Löwe with Dynamo Dresden in 2021

Personal information
- Full name: Justin Leonard Löwe
- Date of birth: 30 December 1998 (age 27)
- Place of birth: Lauchhammer, Germany
- Height: 1.68 m (5 ft 6 in)
- Position: Midfielder

Youth career
- 2005–2010: Glückauf Brieske-Senftenberg
- 2010–2017: Dynamo Dresden

Senior career*
Years	Team	Apps	(Gls)
2017–2022	Dynamo Dresden	8	(1)
2018	→ Oberlausitz Neugersdorf (loan)	10	(3)
- * Club domestic league appearances and goals as of 09:38, 15 September 2022 (UTC)

Justin Leonard Löwe (born 30 December 1998) is a German professional footballer who most recently played as a midfielder for Dynamo Dresden.

== Career ==
Löwe made his professional debut for Dynamo Dresden in the 2. Bundesliga on 2 November 2018, coming on as a substitute in the 90+2nd minute for Aias Aosman in the 3–1 home win against SV Sandhausen.
