= Aias Aosman =

Syrian footballer (born 1994)

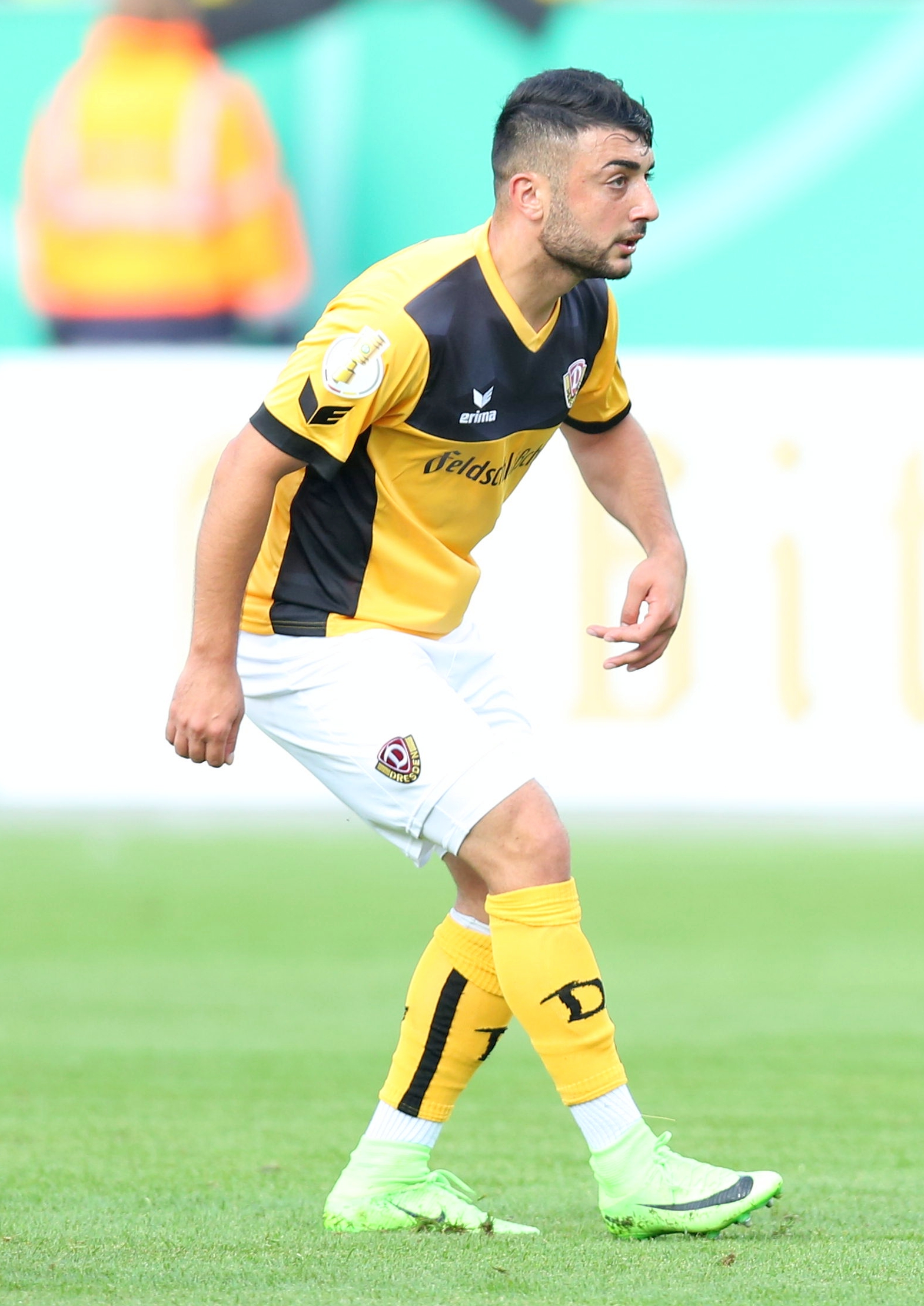
- Aosman with Dynamo Dresden in 2017

Personal information
- Date of birth: 21 October 1994 (age 32)
- Place of birth: Qamishli, Syria
- Height: 1.75 m (5 ft 9 in)
- Position: Attacking midfielder

Youth career
- –2008: TuS Minderheide 1895
- 2008–2009: Arminia Bielefeld
- 2009: VfL Osnabrück
- 2010–2011: FC Preußen Espelkamp

Senior career*
Years	Team	Apps	(Gls)
2011	Wiedenbrück	19	(6)
2012–2013	1. FC Köln II	41	(5)
2013–2015	Jahn Regensburg	67	(16)
2015–2019	Dynamo Dresden	99	(13)
2019–2020	Adana Demirspor	29	(8)
2020–2021	Tuzlaspor	12	(3)
2021	Hermannstadt	13	(1)
2021–2022	Ionikos	31	(8)
2022	Adana Demirspor	0	(0)
2022–2023	Ionikos	13	(2)
2023	Pendikspor	17	(5)
2024–2025	Gençlerbirliği	5	(1)
2025	Gostivar	9	(0)
2025–2026	Chania	16	(1)

International career^{‡}
2018–2021	Syria	15	(2)
- * Club domestic league appearances and goals as of 25 January 2026 ‡ National team caps and goals as of 11 November 2021

Aias Aosman (Arabic: أياز عثمان; born 21 October 1994) is a Syrian professional footballer who plays as a midfielder. He previously played for SC Wiedenbrück 2000, 1. FC Köln II, and SSV Jahn Regensburg. His younger brother Kaoa plays currently for SC Wiedenbrück 2000.

== International career ==
Aosman made his professional debut for the Syria national team in a friendly 1–1 tie with Uzbekistan on 6 September 2018.

== Career statistics ==
=== Club ===
As of match played 25 June 2022

Appearances and goals by club, season and competition
Club	Season	League			National Cup		Other		Total	
Club	Season	Division	Apps	Goals	Apps	Goals	Apps	Goals	Apps	Goals
SC Wiedenbrück 2000	2011–12	Regionalliga West	19	6	1	0	–		20	6
1. FC Köln II	2011–12	Regionalliga West	9	0	–		–		9	0
1. FC Köln II	2012–13	Regionalliga West	32	5	–		–		32	5
1. FC Köln II	Total		41	5	–		–		41	5
Jahn Regensburg	2013–14	3. Liga	33	5	1	0	–		34	5
Jahn Regensburg	2014–15	3. Liga	34	11	0	0	–		34	11
Jahn Regensburg	Total		67	16	1	0	–		68	16
Dynamo Dresden	2015–16	3. Liga	33	5	0	0	–		33	5
Dynamo Dresden	2016–17	2. Bundesliga	30	3	2	0	–		32	3
Dynamo Dresden	2017–18	2. Bundesliga	17	2	2	1	–		19	3
Dynamo Dresden	2018–19	2. Bundesliga	19	3	1	1	–		20	4
Dynamo Dresden	Total		99	13	5	2	–		104	15
Adana Demirspor	2019–20	1.Lig	28	8	1	0	–		29	8
Adana Demirspor	2020–21	1.Lig	1	0	0	0	–		1	0
Hermannstadt	2020–21	Liga I	13	1	0	0	–		13	1
Ionikos	2021–22	Super League Greece	31	8	3	0	–		34	8
Career total			291	57	11	2	–		302	59

=== International ===
As of match played 4 June 2021

Appearances and goals by national team and year
National team	Year	Apps	Goals
Syria	2018	4	0
Syria	2019	2	0
Syria	2020	2	0
Syria	2021	3	2
Total		11	2

Scores and results list Syria's goal tally first, score column indicates score after each Aosman goal.

List of international goals scored by Aias Aosman
No.	Date	Venue	Opponent	Score	Result	Competition
1.	4 June 2021	Sharjah Stadium, Sharjah, United Arab Emirates	Maldives	2–0	4–0	2022 FIFA World Cup qualification
2.	15 June 2021	Sharjah Stadium, Sharjah, United Arab Emirates	China	1–1	1–3	2022 FIFA World Cup qualification

== Honours ==
Dynamo Dresden

- 3. Liga: 2015–16

=== Individual ===
- Ionikos Player of the Season: 2021–22
- Super League Greece Player of the Season: 2021–22
- Super League Greece top assist provider: 2021–22
