= 2014–15 Dynamo Dresden season =

Dynamo Dresden
2014–15 season
- President: Andreas Ritter
- Manager: Stefan Böger (July 2014–February 2015); Peter Németh (February–June 2015)
- Stadium: DDV-Stadion
- 3. Liga: 6th
- DFB-Pokal: Round of 16
- Top goalscorer: League: Justin Eilers (19); All: Justin Eilers (22)
Home colours	Away colours

The 2014–15 Dynamo Dresden season was the 65th season in the football club's history and the first season back in the 3. Liga after having been relegated in the previous season. In addition to the domestic league, Dynamo Dresden also participated in this season's edition of the DFB-Pokal, reaching the round of 16. This was the 62nd season for Dynamo Dresden in the DDV-Stadion, located in Dresden, Germany. The season covered a period from 1 July 2014 to 30 June 2015.

== Players ==
=== Squad information ===
As of 21 May 2015

Note: Flags indicate national team as defined under FIFA eligibility rules; some limited exceptions apply. Players may hold more than one non-FIFA nationality.

No.	Pos.	Nation	Player
1	GK	GER	Markus Scholz
13	GK	GER	Benjamin Kirsten
24	GK	GER	Patrick Wiegers
4	DF	GER	Dennis Erdmann
5	DF	GER	Michael Hefele
6	DF	GER	Marco Hartmann
7	DF	GER	Niklas Kreuzer
14	DF	GER	Alban Sabah
17	DF	GER	Tobias Heppner
18	DF	GER	Jannik Müller
23	DF	GER	David Vrzogic
31	DF	GER	Paul Milde
8	MF	GER	Nils Teixeira
10	MF	GER	Luca Dürholtz

No.	Pos.	Nation	Player
16	MF	GER	Jim-Patrick Müller
21	MF	GER	Quirin Moll
22	MF	TUR	Sinan Tekerci
29	MF	GER	Robin Fluß
31	MF	GER	Robert Andrich
32	MF	GER	Franz Pfanne
34	MF	GER	Marvin Stefaniak
38	MF	GER	Tobias Müller
40	MF	GER	Cristian Fiél
9	FW	NED	Sylvano Comvalius
11	FW	GER	Justin Eilers
19	FW	GER	Mathias Fetsch
20	FW	GER	Dominic Baumann
30	FW	NED	Furghill Zeldenrust

=== Transfers ===
==== Summer ====
In:

No.	Pos.	Nation	Player
4	DF	GER	Dennis Erdmann (from FC Schalke 04 II)
5	DF	GER	Michael Hefele (from SpVgg Greuther Fürth)
7	DF	GER	Niklas Kreuzer (from FC Rot-Weiß Erfurt)
8	MF	GER	Nils Teixeira (from FSV Frankfurt)
9	FW	NED	Sylvano Comvalius (from Eintracht Trier)
10	MF	GER	Luca Dürholtz (from Bayer Leverkusen II)
11	FW	GER	Justin Eilers (from VfL Wolfsburg II)
18	DF	GER	Jannik Müller (from 1. FC Köln II)
19	FW	GER	Mathias Fetsch (on loan from FC Augsburg)
21	MF	GER	Quirin Moll (from SpVgg Unterhaching)
22	MF	TUR	Sinan Tekerci (from 1. FC Nürnberg II)
23	DF	GER	David Vrzogic (from FC Bayern Munich II)
24	GK	GER	Patrick Wiegers (previously unsigned)
30	FW	NED	Furhgill Zeldenrust (from RKC Waalwijk)

Out:

No.	Pos.	Nation	Player
5	DF	FRA	Romain Brégerie (to SV Darmstadt 98)
7	FW	FRA	Idir Ouali (to SC Paderborn)
8	MF	GER	Filip Trojan (career end)
10	FW	BEN	Mickaël Poté (to AC Omonia)
11	MF	FRA	Anthony Losilla (to VfL Bochum)
15	FW	ALG	Mohamed Amine Aoudia (to FSV Frankfurt)
18	MF	GER	Tobias Kempe (to SV Darmstadt 98)
22	FW	SVN	Zlatko Dedić (to FSV Frankfurt)
23	DF	GER	Thorsten Schulz (to Erzgebirge Aue)
24	MF	GER	Christoph Menz (to FC Rot-Weiß Erfurt)
25	MF	GER	Robert Koch (to 1. FC Nürnberg)
27	DF	GER	Sebastian Schuppan (to Arminia Bielefeld)
35	GK	GER	Florian Fromlowitz (to SV Wehen Wiesbaden)
37	DF	GER	Toni Leistner (to Union Berlin)

=== Winter ===
In:

No.	Pos.	Nation	Player
16	MF	GER	Jim-Patrick Müller (from SV Sandhausen)
31	MF	GER	Robert Andrich (from Hertha BSC II)

Out:

No.	Pos.	Nation	Player

== Friendly matches ==
24 June 2014	FV Gröditz	0–8	Dynamo Dresden	Gröditz
18:00		Report	Koch 11', 19', 35'; Comvalius 15', 17'; Müller 45'; Minge 73' (og.); Justin Eilers 88'	Stadium: Stadion am Eichenhain; Attendance: 2,000; Referee: Jens Klemm

3 July 2014	Dynamo Dresden	1–0	Asteras Tripolis F.C.	Jenbach
18:00	Comvalius 61'	Report		Stadium: Stadion Jenbach; Attendance: 149; Referee: Hannes Hell

6 July 2014	Dynamo Dresden	2–1	Neftçi PFK	Walchsee
16:30	Koch 15'; Hefele 51'	Report	Hefele 7' (og.)	Stadium: Ramsbachstadion Walchsee; Attendance: 183; Referee: Stefan Guggenberger

9 July 2014	Dynamo Dresden	3–5	FC Botoșani	Schlitters
17:00	Baumann 12'; Hagemann 41'; Hefele 68'	Report	Batin 8'; Carjan 16' (pen.), 49'; Danci 46'; Müller 63' (og.)	Stadium: Trainingsplatz Schlitters; Attendance: 143; Referee: Bernhard Spitzer

15 July 2014	Dynamo Dresden	2–0	FC Oberlausitz Neugersdorf	Oppach
18:00	Eilers 22' (pen.); Hefele 27'	Report		Stadium: Stadion am Lindenberg; Attendance: 2,124

19 July 2014	Dynamo Dresden	1–1	Celtic F.C.	Dresden
16:15	Comvalius 69'	Report	Commons 8'	Stadium: DDV-Stadion; Attendance: 13,027; Referee: Alexander Sather

13 August 2014	SV Einheit Kamenz	2–3	Dynamo Dresden	Kamenz
18:00	Schidun 16'; Prentki 66'	Report	Zeldenrust 29'; Sabah 37'; Milde 47'	Stadium: Stadion der Jugend; Attendance: 2,025; Referee: Stefan Herde

9 January 2015	BSG Stahl Riesa	1–4	Dynamo Dresden	Riesa
17:30	Wukasch 83'	Report	Kreuzer 30'; Eilers 62'; Baumann 65', 82'	Stadium: Nudelarena; Attendance: 927; Referee: John Köber

14 January 2015	Dynamo Dresden	0–0	Real Murcia	San Pedro del Pinatar
16:30		Report		Stadium: Pinatar Arena; Attendance: 400; Referee: Samuel De Haro Tirado

18 January 2015	Dynamo Dresden	2–3	FC Sion	San Pedro del Pinatar
18:00	Eilers 43'; Zeldenrust 66'	Report	Assifuah 20', 21'; Lacroix 32'	Stadium: Pinatar Arena; Attendance: 50; Referee: Moya Garcia

24 January 2015	Dynamo Dresden	3–1	FK Teplice	Pirna
13:30	Stefaniak 49', 78'; Dürholtz 76'	Report	Lanka 82'	Stadium: Willy-Tröger-Stadion Pirna; Attendance: 1,546; Referee: Felix-Benjamin Schwermer

== Competitions ==
=== 3. Liga ===
==== League table ====
Pos	Team	Pld	W	D	L	GF	GA	GD	Pts	Promotion, qualification or relegation
4	Stuttgarter Kickers	38	18	11	9	61	47	+14	65	Qualification for DFB-Pokal
5	Chemnitzer FC	38	17	8	13	44	36	+8	59	
6	Dynamo Dresden	38	16	8	14	52	48	+4	56	
7	Energie Cottbus	38	15	11	12	50	50	0	56	
8	Preußen Münster	38	15	9	14	53	49	+4	54	

Source: DFB
Rules for classification: 1) Points; 2) Goal difference; 3) Goals scored

==== Results summary ====
Overall								Home						Away					
Pld	W	D	L	GF	GA	GD	Pts	W	D	L	GF	GA	GD	W	D	L	GF	GA	GD
38	16	8	14	52	48	+4	56	9	4	6	26	19	+7	7	4	8	26	29	−3

Last updated: 23 May 2015.
Source: Kicker

==== Results by round ====
Round	1	2	3	4	5	6	7	8	9	10	11	12	13	14	15	16	17	18	19	20	21	22	23	24	25	26	27	28	29	30	31	32	33	34	35	36	37	38
Ground	H	A	A	H	A	H	A	H	A	H	A	H	A	H	A	H	A	H	A	A	H	H	A	H	A	H	A	H	A	H	A	H	A	H	A	H	A	H
Result	W	W	D	W	L	L	W	W	W	D	D	W	L	D	D	D	L	D	W	D	W	W	L	L	L	L	W	L	L	L	L	W	L	L	W	W	W	W
Position	5	2	2	2	5	6	2	2	2	2	2	1	6	3	3	6	10	11	5	6	6	4	5	6	8	8	8	9	9	10	12	11	11	11	10	10	8	6

Updated to match(es) played on 23 May 2015. Source: Kicker
A = Away; H = Home; W = Win; D = Draw; L = Loss

==== Matches ====
26 July 2014 1	Dynamo Dresden	2–1	VfB Stuttgart II	Dresden
14:00	Vier 22' (og.); Dürholtz 35'	Report	Eisele 90'	Stadium: DDV-Stadion; Attendance: 20,653; Referee: Martin Thomsen (referee)

3 August 2014 2	FC Energie Cottbus	1–3	Dynamo Dresden	Cottbus
14:00	Kaufmann 74'	Report	Erdmann 9'; Eilers 16'; Comvalius 38'	Stadium: Stadion der Freundschaft; Attendance: 14,807; Referee: Peter Gagelmann

6 August 2014 3	VfL Osnabrück	2–2	Dynamo Dresden	Osnabrück
18:30	Salem 53'; Menga 59'	Report	Comvalius 23'; Hefele 35'	Stadium: Bremer Brücke; Attendance: 10,131; Referee: Patrick Ittrich

9 August 2014 4	Dynamo Dresden	3–1	SC Preußen Münster	Dresden
14:00	Comvalius 21'; Hartmann 34'; Hefele 48'	Report	Piossek 56'	Stadium: DDV-Stadion; Attendance: 22,344; Referee: Bastian Dankert

23 August 2014 5	FC Rot-Weiß Erfurt	2–0	Dynamo Dresden	Erfurt
14:00	Wiegel 16'; Möhwald 66'	Report		Stadium: Steigerwaldstadion; Attendance: 10,676; Referee: Marco Fritz

26 August 2014 6	Dynamo Dresden	1–2	Holstein Kiel	Dresden
19:00	Eilers 68'	Report	Heider 41'; Siedschlag 89'	Stadium: DDV-Stadion; Attendance: 24,530; Referee: Guido Winkmann

30 August 2014 7	SV Wehen Wiesbaden	0–2	Dynamo Dresden	Wiesbaden
14:00		Report	Eilers 72'; Stefaniak 84'	Stadium: Brita-Arena; Attendance: 5,300; Referee: Timo Gerach

6 September 2014 8	Dynamo Dresden	2–1	SSV Jahn Regensburg	Dresden
14:00	Eilers 15', 78'	Report	Aosman 33'	Stadium: DDV-Stadion; Attendance: 22,000; Referee: Frank Willenborg

13 September 2014 9	SG Sonnenhof Großaspach	1–3	Dynamo Dresden	Großaspach
14:00	Rizzi 36'	Report	Eilers 25', 90'; Comvalius 57'	Stadium: mechatronik Arena; Attendance: 7,329; Referee: Benjamin Cortus

19 September 2014 10	Dynamo Dresden	1–1	1. FSV Mainz 05 II	Dresden
19:00	Justin Eilers 30'	Report	Mounir Bouziane 90+3'	Stadium: DDV-Stadion; Attendance: 23,221; Referee: Marcel Göpferich

24 September 2014 11	Hallescher FC	1–1	Dynamo Dresden	Halle
19:00	Kruse 32'	Report	Fetsch 25'	Stadium: Erdgas Sportpark; Attendance: 12,466; Referee: Peter Gagelmann

27 September 2014 12	Dynamo Dresden	1–0	Chemnitzer FC	Dresden
14:00	Comvalius 85'	Report		Stadium: DDV-Stadion; Attendance: 29,652; Referee: Bibiana Steinhaus

4 October 2014 13	Arminia Bielefeld	4–1	Dynamo Dresden	Bielefeld
14:00	Hemlein 8'; Ulm 22'; Schütz 36'; Klos 76'	Report	Eilers 13'	Stadium: SchücoArena; Attendance: 14,708; Referee: René Rohde

18 October 2014 14	Dynamo Dresden	0–0	Fortuna Köln	Dresden
14:00		Report		Stadium: DDV-Stadion; Attendance: 23,811; Referee: Matthias Jöllenbeck

25 October 2014 15	MSV Duisburg	0–0	Dynamo Dresden	Duisburg
14:00		Report		Stadium: Schauinsland-Reisen-Arena; Attendance: 13,720; Referee: Markus Schmidt

1 November 2014 16	Dynamo Dresden	1–1	Stuttgarter Kickers	Dresden
14:00	Tekerci 54'	Report	Stein 90+2'	Stadium: DDV-Stadion; Attendance: 23,501; Referee: Felix Brych

8 November 2014 17	SpVgg Unterhaching	3–0	Dynamo Dresden	Unterhaching
14:00	Erb 58' (pen.); Hugnagel 77'; Widemann 84'	Report		Stadium: Alpenbauer Sportpark; Attendance: 7,000; Referee: Patrick Schult

21 November 2014 18	Dynamo Dresden	1–1	Borussia Dortmund II	Dresden
19:00	Eilers 13'	Report	Harder 90'	Stadium: DDV-Stadion; Attendance: 23,235; Referee: Patrick Alt

29 November 2014 19	FC Hansa Rostock	1–3	Dynamo Dresden	Rostock
14:00	Jakobs 52'	Report	Fetsch 25', 62', 90+3'	Stadium: DBK-Arena; Attendance: 20,500; Referee: Daniel Siebert

7 December 2014 20	VfB Stuttgart II	0–0	Dynamo Dresden	Großaspach
15:00		Report		Stadium: mechatronik Arena; Attendance: 3,210; Referee: Benjamin Brand

13 December 2014 21	Dynamo Dresden	1–0	FC Energie Cottbus	Dresden
14:00	Tekerci 56'	Report		Stadium: DDV-Stadion; Attendance: 28,440; Referee: Florian Meyer

20 December 2014 22	Dynamo Dresden	2–1	VfL Osnabrück	Dresden
14:00	Hartmann 51'; Eilers 61'	Report	Iljutcenko 29'	Stadium: DDV-Stadion; Attendance: 22,953; Referee: Christian Dietz

1 February 2015 23	SC Preußen Münster	2–1	Dynamo Dresden	Münster
14:00	Reichwein 66'; Krohne 84'	Report	Comvalius 50'	Stadium: Preußenstadion; Attendance: 12,250; Referee: Michael Weiner

7 February 2015 24	Dynamo Dresden	0–1	FC Rot-Weiß Erfurt	Dresden
14:00		Report	Czichos 88'	Stadium: DDV-Stadion; Attendance: 0 Referee: Tobias Reichel

14 February 2015 25	Holstein Kiel	1–0	Dynamo Dresden	Kiel
14:00	Schäffler 76'	Report		Stadium: Holstein-Stadion; Attendance: 7,008; Referee: Sascha Stegemann

21 February 2015 26	Dynamo Dresden	0–1	SV Wehen Wiesbaden	Dresden
14:00		Report	Jänicke 51'	Stadium: DDV-Stadion; Attendance: 20,797; Referee: Martin Petersen

28 February 2015 27	SSV Jahn Regensburg	2–3	Dynamo Dresden	Regensburg
14:00	Hesse 53'; Pusch 73'	Report	Eilers 8', 26', 30' (pen.)	Stadium: Jahn-Stadion; Attendance: 8,742; Referee: Arne Aarnink

7 March 2015 28	Dynamo Dresden	0–1	SG Sonnenhof Großaspach	Dresden
14:00		Report	Morys 67'	Stadium: DDV-Stadion; Attendance: 28,144; Referee: Robert Schröder

14 March 2015 29	1. FSV Mainz 05 II	1–0	Dynamo Dresden	Mainz
14:00	Franzin 18'	Report		Stadium: Bruchwegstadion; Attendance: 2,433; Referee: Sven Waschitzki

21 March 2015 30	Dynamo Dresden	2–3	Hallescher FC	Dresden
14:00	Tekerci 18'; Eilers 73' (pen.)	Report	Franke 24'; Bertram 37'; Furuholm 52'	Stadium: DDV-Stadion; Attendance: 25,392; Referee: Patrick Ittrich

4 April 2015 31	Chemnitzer FC	2–0	Dynamo Dresden	Chemnitz
14:00	Endres 18'; Fink 27'	Report		Stadium: Stadion an der Gellertstraße; Attendance: 10,000; Referee: Christian Bandurski

11 April 2015 32	Dynamo Dresden	2–0	Arminia Bielefeld	Dresden
14:00	Teixeira 35' (pen.), 83'	Report		Stadium: DDV-Stadion; Attendance: 21,653; Referee: Harm Osmers

18 April 2015 33	Fortuna Köln	1–0	Dynamo Dresden	Cologne
14:00	Engelman 28'	Report		Stadium: Südstadion; Attendance: 3,284; Referee: Patrick Schult

26 April 2015 34	Dynamo Dresden	0–2	MSV Duisburg	Dresden
14:00		Report	Onuegbu 66'; Janjić 78' (pen.)	Stadium: DDV-Stadion; Attendance: 22,353; Referee: Markus Schmidt

2 May 2015 35	Stuttgarter Kickers	3–4	Dynamo Dresden	Stuttgart
14:00	Engelbrecht 26'; Edwini-Bonsu 75'; Stein 83'	Report	Kreuzer 14'; Stefaniak 29'; Fennell 57' (og.); Hartmann 90+2'	Stadium: Gazi-Stadion auf der Waldau; Attendance: 8,000; Referee: Tobias Stieler

9 May 2015 36	Dynamo Dresden	5–1	SpVgg Unterhaching	Dresden
14:00	Eilers 4', 39', 64'; Hartmann 49'; Tekerci 75'	Report	Thiel 60' (pen.)	Stadium: DDV-Stadion; Attendance: 20,202; Referee: Robert Kampka

16 May 2015 37	Borussia Dortmund II	2–3	Dynamo Dresden	Dortmund
13:30	Amini 9'; Harder 78'	Report	Hefele 4'; Müller 43'; Dürholtz 62'	Stadium: Stadion Rote Erde; Attendance: 4,100; Referee: Benedikt Kempkes

23 May 2015 38	Dynamo Dresden	2–1	FC Hansa Rostock	Dresden
13:30	Eilers 42'; Tekerci 86'	Report	Ikeng 10'	Stadium: DDV-Stadion; Attendance: 29,534; Referee: Markus Wingenbach

=== DFB-Pokal ===
18 August 2014 First round	Dynamo Dresden	2–1	FC Schalke 04	Dresden
20:30	Eilers 24' (pen.); Teixeira 50'	Report	Matip 78'	Stadium: DDV-Stadion; Attendance: 29,590; Referee: Deniz Aytekin

28 October 2014 Second round	Dynamo Dresden	2–1	VfL Bochum	Dresden
20:30	Eilers 61', 94'	Report	Terodde 53'	Stadium: DDV-Stadion; Attendance: 28,053; Referee: Markus Wingenbach

3 March 2015 Round of 16	Dynamo Dresden	0–2	Borussia Dortmund	Dresden
20:30		Report	Immobile 50', 90'	Stadium: DDV-Stadion; Attendance: 30,503; Referee: Tobias Welz

== Squad and statistics ==
No.	Pos	Nat	Player	Total		3. Liga		DFB-Pokal	
No.	Pos	Nat	Player	Apps	Goals	Apps	Goals	Apps	Goals
Goalkeepers
1	GK	(Germany) GER	Markus Scholz	0	0	0	0	0	0
13	GK	(Germany) GER	Benjamin Kirsten	28	0	26	0	2	0
24	GK	(Germany) GER	Patrick Wiegers	15	0	14	0	1	0
Defenders
4	DF	(Germany) GER	Dennis Erdmann	27	1	24	1	3	0
5	DF	(Germany) GER	Michael Hefele	34	3	31	3	3	0
6	DF	(Germany) GER	Marco Hartmann	17	4	17	4	0	0
7	DF	(Germany) GER	Niklas Kreuzer	34	1	32	1	2	0
14	DF	(Germany) GER	Alban Sabah	12	0	10	0	2	0
17	DF	(Germany) GER	Tobias Heppner	0	0	0	0	0	0
18	DF	(Germany) GER	Jannik Müller	30	1	28	1	2	0
23	DF	(Germany) GER	David Vrzogic	31	0	28	0	3	0
31	DF	(Germany) GER	Paul Milde	1	0	1	0	0	0
Midfielders
8	MF	(Germany) GER	Nils Teixeira	29	3	27	2	2	1
10	MF	(Germany) GER	Luca Dürholtz	35	2	32	2	3	0
16	MF	(Germany) GER	Jim-Patrick Müller	7	0	7	0	0	0
21	MF	(Germany) GER	Quirin Moll	34	0	32	0	2	0
22	MF	(Turkey) TUR	Sinan Tekerci	34	5	31	5	3	0
29	MF	(Germany) GER	Robin Fluß	2	0	2	0	0	0
31	MF	(Germany) GER	Robert Andrich	14	0	13	0	1	0
32	MF	(Germany) GER	Franz Pfanne	1	0	1	0	0	0
34	MF	(Germany) GER	Marvin Stefaniak	35	2	32	2	3	0
38	MF	(Germany) GER	Tobias Müller	12	0	11	0	1	0
40	MF	(Germany) GER	Cristian Fiél	23	0	21	0	2	0
Forwards
9	FW	(Netherlands) NED	Sylvano Comvalius	33	6	31	6	2	0
11	FW	(Germany) GER	Justin Eilers	39	22	36	19	3	3
19	FW	(Germany) GER	Mathias Fetsch	16	4	15	4	1	0
20	FW	(Germany) GER	Dominic Baumann	19	0	18	0	1	0
30	FW	(Netherlands) NED	Furghill Zeldenrust	11	0	11	0	0	0
