= 2016–17 Dynamo Dresden season =

Dynamo Dresden
2016–17 season
- President: Andreas Ritter
- Manager: Uwe Neuhaus
- Stadium: DDV-Stadion
- 2. Bundesliga: 5th
- DFB-Pokal: Second round
- Top goalscorer: League: Stefan Kutschke (16); All: Stefan Kutschke (18)
Home colours	Away colours

The 2016–17 Dynamo Dresden season was the 67th season in the football club's history and the first season since 2013–14 in the second division of German football, the 2. Bundesliga and 6th overall. In addition to the domestic league, Dynamo Dresden also participated in this season's edition of the DFB-Pokal. This was the 64th season for Dynamo Dresden in the Rudolf-Harbig-Stadion, located in Dresden, Germany. The season covered a period from 1 July 2016 to 30 June 2017.

== Players ==
=== Squad information ===
As of 21 May 2017

Note: Flags indicate national team as defined under FIFA eligibility rules; some limited exceptions apply. Players may hold more than one non-FIFA nationality.

No.	Pos.	Nation	Player
1	GK	GER	Markus Schubert
2	MF	GER	Akaki Gogia
3	DF	GER	Marc Wachs
4	DF	ARG	Giuliano Modica
5	MF	GER	Manuel Konrad
6	MF	GER	Marco Hartmann (captain)
7	DF	GER	Niklas Kreuzer
8	MF	GER	Nils Teixeira
9	FW	FIN	Tim Väyrynen
10	MF	GER	Marvin Stefaniak
11	MF	SYR	Aias Aosman
14	GK	FRA	Jean-François Kornetzky
17	MF	GER	Andreas Lambertz
18	DF	GER	Jannik Müller

No.	Pos.	Nation	Player
20	DF	GER	Fabian Müller
21	DF	GER	Hendrik Starostzik
23	DF	GER	Florian Ballas
24	GK	GER	Patrick Wiegers
25	GK	GER	Marvin Schwäbe (on loan from 1899 Hoffenheim)
28	DF	GER	Niklas Landgraf
29	MF	GER	Robin Fluß
30	FW	GER	Stefan Kutschke
31	FW	GER	Marcos Álvarez
33	MF	GER	Marcel Hilßner
36	MF	GER	Niklas Hauptmann
37	FW	GER	Pascal Testroet
40	MF	GER	Erich Berko

=== Transfers ===
==== Summer ====
In:

No.	Pos.	Nation	Player
2	MF	GER	Akaki Gogia (on loan from Brentford F.C.)
3	DF	GER	Marc Wachs (from FSV Mainz 05 II)
5	DF	GER	Manuel Konrad (from FSV Frankfurt)
21	DF	GER	Hendrik Starostzik (from Stuttgarter Kickers)
23	DF	GER	Florian Ballas (from FSV Frankfurt)
25	GK	GER	Marvin Schwäbe (from TSG Hoffenheim)
33	MF	GER	Marcel Hilßner (from Werder Bremen II)
40	MF	GER	Erich Berko (from Stuttgarter Kickers)

Out:

No.	Pos.	Nation	Player
1	GK	GER	Janis Blaswich (loan return to Borussia Mönchengladbach)
5	DF	GER	Michael Hefele (to Huddersfield Town A.F.C.)
10	MF	GER	Luca Dürholtz (to Holstein Kiel)
11	FW	GER	Justin Eilers (to Werder Bremen)
16	MF	GER	Jim-Patrick Müller (to SpVgg Unterhaching)
21	MF	GER	Quirin Moll (to Eintracht Braunschweig)
22	MF	TUR	Sinan Tekerci (on loan to SC Preußen Münster)
23	DF	GER	Fabian Holthaus (loan return to Fortuna Düsseldorf)
33	MF	GER	Robert Andrich (to SV Wehen Wiesbaden)

=== Winter ===
In:

No.	Pos.	Nation	Player
16	DF	GER	Philip Heise (from VfB Stuttgart)
31	DF	GER	Marcos Álvarez (free agent)

Out:

No.	Pos.	Nation	Player
9	FW	FIN	Tim Väyrynen (to Hansa Rostock)

== Friendly matches ==
23 July 2016	Dynamo Dresden	2–2	FC Ingolstadt 04	Oberkotzau
13:00	Kutschke 6'; Modica 21'	Report	Groß 41'; Lex 83'	Attendance: 1,300

29 July 2016	Dynamo Dresden	2–1	Everton F.C.	Dresden
20:30	Hauptmann 14'; Testroet 65'	Report	Deulofeu 40'	Stadium: DDV-Stadion; Attendance: 12,353

30 July 2016	Dynamo Dresden	1–1 (3–4 p)	Werder Bremen	Dresden
16:00	Kutschke 82'	Report	Eggestein 87'	Stadium: DDV-Stadion; Attendance: 13,852; Referee: Steffen Mix
	Penalties
	Kutschke (penalty scored); Väyrynen (penalty scored); Hilßner (penalty missed); Kreuzer (penalty missed); Hartmann (penalty scored)		Sternberg (penalty scored); Hajrović (penalty scored); U. Garcia (penalty missed); Petsos (penalty scored); J. Eggestein (penalty scored)

2 September 2016	Dynamo Dresden	0–1	VfL Wolfsburg	Wolfsburg
13:30		Report	Gómez 29'	Stadium: Volkswagen Arena; Attendance: 0

== Competitions ==
=== 2. Bundesliga ===
==== League table ====
Pos	Team	Pld	W	D	L	GF	GA	GD	Pts	Promotion, qualification or relegation
3	Eintracht Braunschweig	34	19	9	6	50	36	+14	66	Qualification for promotion play-offs
4	Union Berlin	34	18	6	10	51	39	+12	60	
5	Dynamo Dresden	34	13	11	10	53	46	+7	50	
6	1. FC Heidenheim	34	12	10	12	43	39	+4	46	
7	FC St. Pauli	34	12	9	13	39	35	+4	45	

Source: DFB
Rules for classification: 1) Points; 2) Goal difference; 3) Goals scored

==== Results summary ====
Overall								Home						Away					
Pld	W	D	L	GF	GA	GD	Pts	W	D	L	GF	GA	GD	W	D	L	GF	GA	GD
34	13	11	10	53	46	+7	50	6	8	3	27	21	+6	7	3	7	26	25	+1

Last updated: 21 May 2017.
Source: Kicker

==== Results by round ====
Round	1	2	3	4	5	6	7	8	9	10	11	12	13	14	15	16	17	18	19	20	21	22	23	24	25	26	27	28	29	30	31	32	33	34
Ground	H	A	H	A	H	A	H	A	H	A	H	A	H	H	A	H	A	A	H	A	H	A	H	A	H	A	H	A	H	A	A	H	A	H
Result	D	D	W	W	L	L	D	L	W	D	W	W	W	D	L	D	W	W	D	L	L	W	D	W	W	D	W	L	D	L	L	L	W	D
Position	9	10	5	2	8	11	10	11	9	10	8	8	6	7	7	6	7	5	5	6	6	5	5	5	5	5	5	5	5	5	5	5	5	5

Updated to match(es) played on 21 May 2017. Source: Kicker
A = Away; H = Home; W = Win; D = Draw; L = Loss

==== Matches ====
6 August 2016 1	Dynamo Dresden	1–1	1. FC Nürnberg	Dresden
15:30	Testroet 90+4'	Report	Burgstaller 45'	Stadium: DDV-Stadion; Attendance: 29,453; Referee: Tobias Welz

15 August 2016 2	1. FC Union Berlin	2–2	Dynamo Dresden	Berlin
20:15	Quaner 58', 66'	Report	Aosman 8'; Lambertz 69'	Stadium: Stadion An der Alten Försterei; Attendance: 22,012; Referee: Wolfgang Stark

28 August 2016 3	Dynamo Dresden	1–0	FC St. Pauli	Dresden
13:30	Lambertz 7'	Report		Stadium: DDV-Stadion; Attendance: 29,350; Referee: Manuel Gräfe

11 September 2016 4	Hannover 96	0–2	Dynamo Dresden	Hannover
13:30		Report	Stefaniak 18'; Ballas 57'	Stadium: HDI-Arena; Attendance: 39,200; Referee: Sören Storks

18 September 2016 5	Dynamo Dresden	0–3	Erzgebirge Aue	Dresden
13:30		Report	Kaufmann 32'; Skarlatidis 34'; Köpke 54'	Stadium: DDV-Stadion; Attendance: 30,274; Referee: Sascha Stegemann

21 September 2016 6	1. FC Kaiserslautern	3–0	Dynamo Dresden	Kaiserslautern
17:30	Zoua 16', 56'; Osawe 51'	Report		Stadium: Fritz-Walter-Stadion; Attendance: 19,606; Referee: Robert Schröder

25 September 2016 7	Dynamo Dresden	2–2	Würzburger Kickers	Dresden
13:30	Hartmann 2'; Gogia 58'	Report	Müller 50'; Schröck 72'	Stadium: DDV-Stadion; Attendance: 27,710; Referee: Patrick Ittrich

30 September 2016 8	SV Sandhausen	2–0	Dynamo Dresden	Sandhausen
18:30	Wooten 8'; Kister 15'	Report		Stadium: Hardtwaldstadion; Attendance: 5,754; Referee: Günter Perl

15 October 2016 9	Dynamo Dresden	5–0	VfB Stuttgart	Dresden
13:00	Kutschke 38'; Lambertz 42'; Gogia 44', 74'; Testroet 76'	Report		Stadium: DDV-Stadion; Attendance: 29,906; Referee: Benjamin Cortus

22 October 2016 10	1. FC Heidenheim	0–0	Dynamo Dresden	Heidenheim
13:00		Report		Stadium: Voith-Arena; Attendance: 13,200; Referee: Deniz Aytekin

28 October 2016 11	Dynamo Dresden	3–2	Eintracht Braunschweig	Dresden
18:45	Kutschke 69', 74', 80'	Report	Hernández 10'; Kumbela 52'	Stadium: DDV-Stadion; Attendance: 29,097; Referee: Daniel Siebert

4 November 2016 12	Fortuna Düsseldorf	0–3	Dynamo Dresden	Düsseldorf
18:30		Report	Hauptmann 1'; Gogia 26', 50'	Stadium: Esprit-Arena; Attendance: 31,167; Referee: Robert Schröder

20 November 2016 13	Dynamo Dresden	2–1	SpVgg Greuther Fürth	Dresden
13:30	Gogia 20', 86'	Report	Dursun 90+2'	Stadium: DDV-Stadion; Attendance: 28,097; Referee: Martin Petersen

26 November 2016 14	Dynamo Dresden	2–2	VfL Bochum	Dresden
13:00	Aosman 32'; Kutschke 40'	Report	Wurtz 15'; Mlapa 85'	Stadium: DDV-Stadion; Attendance: 27,372; Referee: Sascha Stegemann

3 December 2016 15	TSV 1860 Munich	1–0	Dynamo Dresden	Munich
13:00	Aycicek 89'	Report		Stadium: Allianz Arena; Attendance: 43,400; Referee: Sören Storks

9 December 2016 16	Dynamo Dresden	0–0	Karlsruher SC	Dresden
18:30		Report		Stadium: DDV-Stadion; Attendance: 27,612; Referee: Christof Günsch

18 December 2016 17	Arminia Bielefeld	1–2	Dynamo Dresden	Bielefeld
13:30	Klos 55'	Report	Kutschke 14'; Testroet 81'	Stadium: SchücoArena; Attendance: 18,310; Referee: Matthias Jöllenbeck

29 January 2017 18	1. FC Nürnberg	1–2	Dynamo Dresden	Nuremberg
13:30	Mühl 71'	Report	Heise 31'; Berko 46'	Stadium: Stadion Nürnberg; Attendance: 35,984; Referee: Florian Heft

5 February 2017 19	Dynamo Dresden	0–0	1. FC Union Berlin	Dresden
13:30		Report		Stadium: DDV-Stadion; Attendance: 30,153; Referee: Benjamin Brand

12 February 2017 20	FC St. Pauli	2–0	Dynamo Dresden	Hamburg
13:30	Choi 28'; Şahin 59'	Report		Stadium: Millerntor-Stadion; Attendance: 29,546; Referee: Deniz Aytekin

19 February 2017 21	Dynamo Dresden	1–2	Hannover 96	Dresden
13:30	Kutschke 78'	Report	Harnik 64'; Karaman 80'	Stadium: DDV-Stadion; Attendance: 29,820; Referee: Florian Badstübner

26 February 2017 22	Erzgebirge Aue	1–4	Dynamo Dresden	Aue
13:30	Nazarov 60' (pen.)	Report	Müller 16'; Kreuzer 21'; Kutschke 39', 45+2'	Stadium: Sparkassen-Erzgebirgsstadion; Attendance: 10,000; Referee: Manuel Gräfe

3 March 2017 23	Dynamo Dresden	3–3	1. FC Kaiserslautern	Dresden
18:30	Konrad 32'; Kutschke 45+2' (pen.), 77'	Report	Glatzel 19', 27'; Przybyłko 87'	Stadium: DDV-Stadion; Attendance: 28,907; Referee: Robert Hartmann

11 March 2017 24	Würzburger Kickers	0–2	Dynamo Dresden	Würzburg
13:00		Report	Aosman 47'; Kreuzer 77'	Stadium: flyeralarm Arena; Attendance: 12,450; Referee: Martin Thomsen

19 March 2017 25	Dynamo Dresden	2–0	SV Sandhausen	Dresden
13:30	Berko 29'; Kister 79' (o.g.)	Report		Stadium: DDV-Stadion; Attendance: 27,926; Referee: Bastian Dankert

2 April 2017 26	VfB Stuttgart	3–3	Dynamo Dresden	Stuttgart
13:30	Terodde 29', 90+4' (pen.); Insúa 75'	Report	Kutschke 4', 22', 26' (pen.)	Stadium: Mercedes-Benz Arena; Attendance: 58,000; Referee: Günter Perl

5 April 2017 27	Dynamo Dresden	2–1	1. FC Heidenheim	Dresden
17:30	Berko 75'; Kutschke 86'	Report	Griesbeck 49'	Stadium: DDV-Stadion; Attendance: 19,687; Referee: Christian Dietz

10 April 2017 28	Eintracht Braunschweig	1–0	Dynamo Dresden	Braunschweig
20:15	Reichel 90+2'	Report		Stadium: Eintracht-Stadion; Attendance: 22,880; Referee: Daniel Siebert

16 April 2017 29	Dynamo Dresden	1–1	Fortuna Düsseldorf	Dresden
13:30	Kutschke 77'	Report	Gartner 17'	Stadium: DDV-Stadion; Attendance: 29,297; Referee: Christof Günsch

21 April 2017 30	SpVgg Greuther Fürth	1–0	Dynamo Dresden	Fürth
18:30	Aosman 74' (o.g.)	Report		Stadium: Sportpark Ronhof; Attendance: 10,775; Referee: Florian Heft

28 April 2017 31	VfL Bochum	4–2	Dynamo Dresden	Bochum
18:30	Eisfeld 50'; Stiepermann 51'; Losilla 70'; Saglam 88'	Report	Hauptmann 7'; Gogia 25'	Stadium: Vonovia Ruhrstadion; Attendance: 17,264; Referee: Lasse Koslowski

5 May 2017 32	Dynamo Dresden	1–2	TSV 1860 Munich	Dresden
18:30	Hartmann 89'	Report	Gytkjær 43'; Aycicek 46'	Stadium: DDV-Stadion; Attendance: 29,564; Referee: Robert Schröder

14 May 2017 33	Karlsruher SC	3–4	Dynamo Dresden	Karlsruhe
15:30	Zawada 7', 89'; Krebs 90+1'	Report	Müller 12', 80'; Gogia 35', 37' (pen.)	Stadium: Wildparkstadion; Attendance: 5,972; Referee: Christian Dietz

21 May 2017 34	Dynamo Dresden	1–1	Arminia Bielefeld	Dresden
15:30	Müller 62'	Report	Börner 84'	Stadium: DDV-Stadion; Attendance: 30,530; Referee: Christian Dingert

=== DFB-Pokal ===
20 August 2016 First round	Dynamo Dresden	2–2 (5–4 p)	RB Leipzig	Dresden
15:30	Kutschke 47' (pen.), 78'	Report	Sabitzer 15'; Kaiser 45+2'	Stadium: DDV-Stadion; Attendance: 29,222; Referee: Felix Brych
	Penalties
	Testroet (penalty scored); Stefaniak (penalty scored); Teixeira (penalty scored); Gogia (penalty scored); Aosman (penalty scored)		Kalmár (penalty scored); Orban (penalty scored); Ilsanker (penalty scored); Kaiser (penalty missed); Halstenberg (penalty scored)

25 October 2016 Second round	Dynamo Dresden	0–1	Arminia Bielefeld	Dresden
18:30		Report	Hemlein 66'	Stadium: DDV-Stadion; Attendance: 26,819; Referee: Robert Kampka

== Squad and statistics ==
No.	Pos	Nat	Player	Total		2. Bundesliga		DFB-Pokal	
No.	Pos	Nat	Player	Apps	Goals	Apps	Goals	Apps	Goals
Goalkeepers
1	GK	(Germany) GER	Markus Schubert	0	0	0	0	0	0
14	GK	(Germany) GER	Jean-François Kornetzky	0	0	0	0	0	0
24	GK	(Germany) GER	Patrick Wiegers	1	0	1	0	0	0
25	GK	(Germany) GER	Marvin Schwäbe	35	0	33	0	2	0
Defenders
3	DF	(Germany) GER	Marc Wachs	0	0	0	0	0	0
4	DF	(Argentina) ARG	Giuliano Modica	19	0	18	0	1	0
7	DF	(Germany) GER	Niklas Kreuzer	29	2	27	2	2	0
18	DF	(Germany) GER	Jannik Müller	28	4	27	4	1	0
20	DF	(Germany) GER	Fabian Müller	25	0	24	0	1	0
21	DF	(Germany) GER	Hendrik Starostzik	5	0	4	0	1	0
23	DF	(Germany) GER	Florian Ballas	29	1	27	1	2	0
28	DF	(Germany) GER	Niklas Landgraf	1	0	1	0	0	0
Midfielders
2	MF	(Germany) GER	Akaki Gogia	24	10	22	10	2	0
5	MF	(Germany) GER	Manuel Konrad	16	1	15	1	1	0
6	MF	(Germany) GER	Marco Hartmann	30	2	28	2	2	0
8	MF	(Germany) GER	Nils Teixeira	19	0	17	0	2	0
10	MF	(Germany) GER	Marvin Stefaniak	28	1	26	1	2	0
11	MF	(Syria) SYR	Aias Aosman	32	3	30	3	2	0
17	MF	(Germany) GER	Andreas Lambertz	28	3	28	3	0	0
29	MF	(Germany) GER	Robin Fluß	0	0	0	0	0	0
33	MF	(Germany) GER	Marcel Hilßner	8	0	8	0	0	0
36	MF	(Germany) GER	Niklas Hauptmann	30	2	29	2	1	0
40	MF	(Germany) GER	Erich Berko	30	3	29	3	1	0
Forwards
30	FW	(Germany) GER	Stefan Kutschke	34	18	32	16	2	2
31	FW	(Germany) GER	Marcos Álvarez	5	0	5	0	0	0
37	FW	(Germany) GER	Pascal Testroet	25	3	23	3	2	0
Players transferred out during the season
9	FW	(Finland) FIN	Tim Väyrynen	1	0	1	0	0	0
