= 2015–16 Dynamo Dresden season =

Dynamo Dresden
2015–16 season
- Head coach: Uwe Neuhaus
- Stadium: Stadion Dresden
- 3. Liga: 1st
Home colours	Away colours

The 2015–16 Dynamo Dresden season was the 66th season in the club's history and their second consecutive season in the 3. Liga.

== Review ==
=== July/August ===
The opening match of the season took place on 25 July 2015. Dynamo Dresden defeated VfB Stuttgart II 4–1. Dresden got two goals from Justin Eilers and a goal each from Aias Aosman and Tim Väyrynen. Matthias Zimmermann scored for Stuttgart II. Dynamo Dresden finished the matchday in second place. Matchday two against Würzburger Kickers, on 1 August 2015, finished in a 1–1 draw. Michael Hefele scored for Dynamo Dresden and Amir Shapourzadeh scored for Würzburger Kickers. Dynamo Dresden finished the matchday in third place. Matchday three took place on 13 August 2015 against Rot-Weiß Erfurt. Dynamo Dresden won 3–1. Pascal Testroet, Aias Aosman, and Justin Eilers scored for Dynamo Dreden. Carsten Kammlott scored for Rot-Weiß Erfurt. Dynamo Dresden finished the matchday in first place.

== Season ==
=== 3. Liga ===
==== League table ====
Pos	Team	Pld	W	D	L	GF	GA	GD	Pts	Promotion, qualification or relegation
1	Dynamo Dresden (C, P)	38	21	15	2	75	35	+40	78	Promotion to 2. Bundesliga and qualification for DFB-Pokal
2	Erzgebirge Aue (P)	38	19	13	6	42	21	+21	70	Promotion to 2. Bundesliga and qualification for DFB-Pokal
3	Würzburger Kickers (O, P)	38	16	16	6	43	25	+18	64	Qualification for promotion play-offs and DFB-Pokal
4	1. FC Magdeburg	38	14	14	10	49	37	+12	56	Qualification for DFB-Pokal
5	VfL Osnabrück	38	14	14	10	46	41	+5	56	

Source: DFB
Rules for classification: 1) Points; 2) Goal difference; 3) Goals scored
(C) Champions; (O) Play-off winners; (P) Promoted

==== Results summary ====
Overall								Home						Away					
Pld	W	D	L	GF	GA	GD	Pts	W	D	L	GF	GA	GD	W	D	L	GF	GA	GD
38	21	15	2	75	35	+40	78	13	5	1	41	15	+26	8	10	1	34	20	+14

Last updated: 8 May 2016.

==== Fixtures and results ====
MD	Date	H/A	Opponent	Res. F–A	Att.	Goalscorers		Table		Ref.
MD	Date	H/A	Opponent	Res. F–A	Att.	Dynamo Dresden	Opponent	Pos.	Pts.	Ref.
1	25 July 2015	H	Stuttgart II	4–1	25,530	Aosman 23'; Väyrynen 34'; Eilers 55', 63'	Zimmermann 60'	2	3	
2	1 August 2015	A	Würzburger Kickers	1–1	9,011	Hefele 84'	Shapourzadeh 78'	3	4	
3	13 August 2015	H	Rot-Weiß Erfurt	3–1	28,174	Testroet 48'; Aosman 87'; Eilers 90+2'	Kammlott 67'	1	7	
4	23 August 2015	A	Mainz II	1–1	3,424	Eilers 60'	Saller 50'	1	8	
5	26 August 2015	H	Halle	3–2	27,135	Eilers 12'; Hefele 85'; Modica 87'	Bertram 45+1' (pen.); Engelhardt 74'	1	11	
6	29 August 2015	A	Werder Bremen II	2–1	2,900	Lambertz 71'; Eilers 90' (pen.)	Hilßner 10'	1	14	
7	6 September 2015	H	Chemnitz	1–0	29,555	Testroet 52'	—	1	17	
8	12 September 2015	A	Fortuna Köln	5–1	3,341	Eilers 4', 84' (pen.); Hefele 11'; Testroet 47'; Aosman 53'	Königs 68'	1	20	
9	19 September 2015	H	Osnabrück	2–1	26,368	Eilers 12', 90+2'	Alvarez 36'	1	23	
10	23 September 2015	A	Stuttgarter Kickers	2–1	8,000	Eilers 15'; Hefele 65'	Soriano 79'	1	26	
11	27 September 2015	H	Aalen	4–0	26,489	Tekerci 1'; Hefele 34'; Testroet 52'; Lambertz 62'	—	1	29	
12	3 October 2015	A	Hansa Rostock	3–1	17,600	Hartmann 14'; Dorda 75' (o.g.); Testroet 90+2'	Ikeng 89'	1	32	
13	17 October 2015	H	Energie Cottbus	0–1	28,996	—	Holz 53'	1	32	
14	24 October 2015	A	Holstein Kiel	2–1	6,639	Stefaniak 13'; Eilers 35'	Siedschlag 75'	1	35	
15	31 October 2015	H	Magdeburg	3–2	29,321	Eilers 21' (pen.), 81'; Testroet 73'	Farrona-Pulido 35'; Malone 89'	1	38	
16	6 November 2015	A	Wehen Wiesbaden	2–2	5,942	Testroet 50'; Hefele 90+2'	Lorenz 20'; Schnellbacher 77'	1	39	
17	21 November 2015	A	Erzgebirge Aue	1–1	15,000	Testroet 19'	Breitkreuz 73'	1	40	
18	28 November 2015	H	Preußen Münster	0–0	27,853	—	—	1	41	
19	4 December 2015	A	Sonnenhof Großaspach	0–0	9,751 (sell-out)	—	—	1	42	
20	11 December 2015	A	Stuttgart II	1–1	1,930	Grüttner 82'	Modica 90'	1	43	
21	17 December 2015	H	Würzburger Kickers	2–1	25,775	Testroet 28'; Eilers 45+1'	Karsanidis 38'	1	46	
22	23 January 2016	A	Rot-Weiß Erfurt	2–3	7,273	Testroet 20'; Hartmann 90+3'	Höcher 45+1'; Tyrała 69' (pen.); Aydın 90+1'	1	46	
23	30 January 2016	H	Mainz II	3–0	24,184	Testroet 23'; Hartmann 37'; Lambertz 60'	—	1	49	
24	7 February 2016	A	Halle	0–0	11,534	—	—	1	50	
25	14 February 2016	H	Werder Bremen II	2–1	24,844	Hartmann 37'; Kutschke 54'	Hilßner 16' (pen.)	1	53	
26	20 February 2016	A	Chemnitz	2–2	10,644	Aosman 6'; Testroet 37'	Hefele 13' (o.g.); Danneberg 85'	1	54	
27	27 February 2016	H	Fortuna Köln	4–0	24,142	Aosman 11'; Testroet 20', 49'; Eilers 67'		1	57	
28	2 March 2016	A	Osnabrück	3–0	13,782	Testroet 8', 36'; Eilers 85'	—	1	60	
29	6 March 2016	H	Stuttgarter Kickers	1–1	26,890	Stefaniak 60'	Nebihi 76'	1	61	
30	11 March 2016	A	Aalen	0–0	7,512	—	—	1	62	
31	19 March 2016	H	Hansa Rostock	2–2	28,622	Eilers 28'; Andrich 87'	Hartmann 82' (o.g.); Ahlschwede 90'	1	63	
32	2 April 2016	A	Energie Cottbus	2–0	15,255	Eilers 33'; Testroet 82'	—	1	66	
33	9 April 2016	H	Holstein Kiel	0–0	28,935	—	—	1	67	
34	16 April 2016	A	Magdeburg	2–2	21,954 (sell-out)	Niemeyer 41'; Farrona-Pulido 60'	Testroet 63'; Eilers 65'	1	68	
35	23 April 2016	H	Wehen Wiesbaden	4–0	29,219	Kutschke 46'; Eilers 58'; Stefaniak 82'; Väyrynen 86'	—	1	71	
36	30 April 2016	H	Erzgebirge Aue	1–1	29,653	Hefele 26'	Kvesić 66'	1	72	
37	7 May 2016	A	Preußen Münster	3–2	8,450	Kutschke 7'; Eilers 19', 43'	Bischoff 82' (pen.); Laprevotte 84'	1	75	
38	14 May 2016	H	Sonnenhof Großaspach	2–1	31,644	Stefaniak 78'; Väyrynen 88'	Röttger 15'	1	78	
