= Paul Milde =

Paul Milde may refer to:

- Paul Milde (footballer)
- Paul Milde (politician)
