= Niklas Landgraf =

German footballer

Personal information
- Full name: Niklas Landgraf
- Date of birth: 1 March 1996 (age 30)
- Place of birth: Chemnitz, Germany
- Height: 1.77 m (5 ft 10 in)
- Position: Defender

Team information
- Current team: Hallescher FC
- Number: 31

Youth career
- –2004: TSV IFA Chemnitz
- 2004–2010: Chemnitzer FC
- 2010–2015: Dynamo Dresden

Senior career*
Years	Team	Apps	(Gls)
2014–2015	Dynamo Dresden II	2	(0)
2015–2017	Dynamo Dresden	2	(0)
2017–	Hallescher FC	271	(4)
- * Club domestic league appearances and goals as of 23 September 2026

Niklas Landgraf (born 1 March 1996) is a German professional footballer who plays as a defender for Hallescher FC. In April 2022, he extended his contract for another three years until summer 2025.

== Career statistics ==
As of match played on 21 April 2023

Club statistics
Club	Season	League			National Cup		Other		Total	
Club	Season	Division	Apps	Goals	Apps	Goals	Apps	Goals	Apps	Goals
Dynamo Dresden II	2014–15	NOFV-Oberliga	2	0	—		—		2	0
Dynamo Dresden	2015–16	3. Liga	1	0	0	0	1 (Note: Appearance in the Saxony Cup)	0	2	0
Dynamo Dresden	2016–17	2. Bundesliga	1	0	0	0	—		1	0
Dynamo Dresden	Dyanmo Dresden totals		2	0	0	0	1	0	3	0
Hallescher FC	2017–18	3. Liga	18	0	0	0	1 (Note: Appearance(s) in the Saxony-Anhalt Cup)	0	19	0
Hallescher FC	2018–19	3. Liga	37	0	0	0	2	0	39	0
Hallescher FC	2019–20	3. Liga	32	0	1	0	—		33	0
Hallescher FC	2020–21	3. Liga	31	0	0	0	—		31	0
Hallescher FC	2021–22	3. Liga	32	0	0	0	2	0	34	0
Hallescher FC	2022–23	3. Liga	28	0	0	0	—		28	0
Hallescher FC	Hallescher FC totals		178	0	1	0	5	0	184	0
Career totals			182	0	1	0	6	0	189	0
