= Niklas Kreuzer =

German footballer (born 1993)

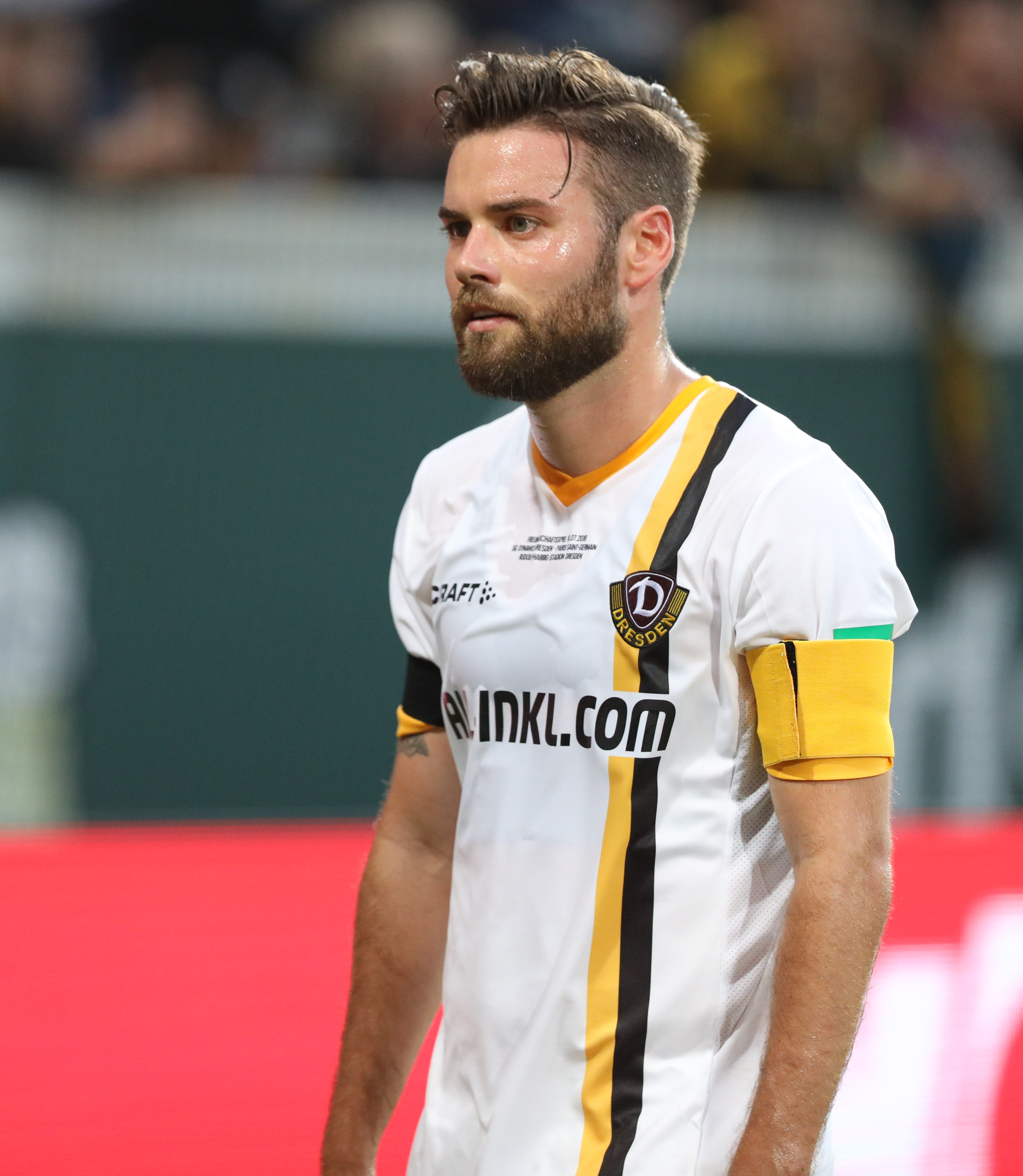
- Kreuzer with Dynamo Dresden in 2019

Personal information
- Date of birth: 20 February 1993 (age 33)
- Place of birth: Munich, Germany
- Height: 1.78 m (5 ft 10 in)
- Position: Right-back

Team information
- Current team: SV Sandhausen
- Number: 16

Youth career
- –2008: SV 1880 München
- 2008–2013: FC Basel

Senior career*
Years	Team	Apps	(Gls)
2013–2014	Rot-Weiss Erfurt	18	(0)
2014–2020	Dynamo Dresden	147	(5)
2021	Dynamo Dresden	10	(1)
2021–2024	Hallescher FC	78	(7)
2024–	SV Sandhausen	26	(0)

International career
2008	Germany U16	9	(0)
2009	Germany U17	5	(0)
2012	Germany U20	2	(0)
- * Club domestic league appearances and goals as of 24 May 2025

Niklas Kreuzer (born 20 February 1993) is a German professional footballer who plays as a right-back for side SV Sandhausen.

== Career ==
In 2013, Kreuzer joined FC Rot-Weiß Erfurt on a free transfer from the FC Basel second team. He made 18 appearances for Rot-Weiß Erfurt in the 2013–14 3. Liga.

Ahead of the 2014–15 season, Kreuzer signed a one-year contract with Dynamo Dresden. Following the season, Kreuzer signed an extension with Dynamo Dresden for two more years until 2017.

In 2021, Kreuzer rejoined Dynamo Dresden on a short-term contract until the end of the season.

On 29 August 2024, Kreuzer signed with SV Sandhausen in 3. Liga.

== Personal life ==
He is the son of Oliver Kreuzer.

He missed the first half of the 2023–24 season undergoing treatment for testicular cancer, which was successful.

== Career statistics ==
As of match played 11 April 2021

Appearances and goals by club, season and competition
Club	Season	League			Cup		Other		Total	
Club	Season	Division	Apps	Goals	Apps	Goals	Apps	Goals	Apps	Goals
Rot-Weiß Erfurt	2013–14	3. Liga	18	0	0	0	0	0	18	0
Dynamo Dresden	2014–15	3. Liga	32	1	2	0	0	0	34	1
Dynamo Dresden	2015–16	3. Liga	25	0	0	0	0	0	25	0
Dynamo Dresden	2016–17	2. Bundesliga	27	2	2	0	0	0	29	2
Dynamo Dresden	2017–18	2. Bundesliga	25	1	1	0	0	0	26	1
Dynamo Dresden	2018–19	2. Bundesliga	19	0	1	0	0	0	20	0
Dynamo Dresden	2019–20	2. Bundesliga	19	1	2	0	0	0	21	1
Dynamo Dresden	Total		147	5	8	0	0	0	155	5
Dynamo Dresden	2020–21	2. Bundesliga	5	1	0	0	0	0	5	1
Career total			170	6	8	0	0	0	178	6
