= Marvin Stefaniak =

German footballer (born 1995)

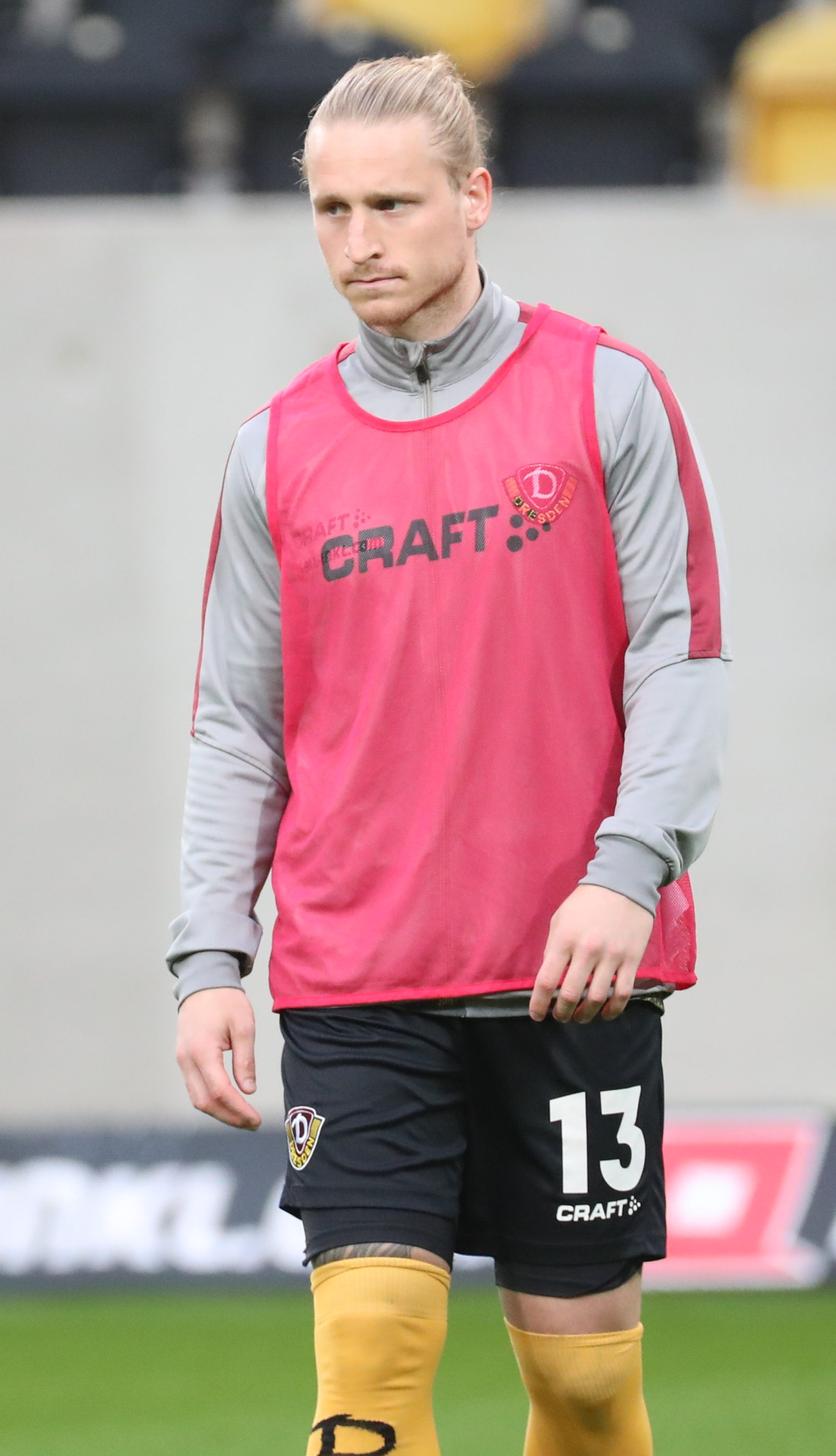
- Stefaniak in 2021

Personal information
- Date of birth: 3 February 1995 (age 31)
- Place of birth: Hoyerswerda, Germany
- Height: 1.78 m (5 ft 10 in)
- Position: Midfielder

Team information
- Current team: Erzgebirge Aue
- Number: 34

Youth career
- Hoyerswerdaer SV 1919
- –2010: SC Borea Dresden
- 2011–2013: Dynamo Dresden

Senior career*
Years	Team	Apps	(Gls)
2013	Dynamo Dresden II	2	(2)
2013–2017	Dynamo Dresden	100	(7)
2017–2022	VfL Wolfsburg	0	(0)
2018	→ 1. FC Nürnberg (loan)	9	(1)
2019–2020	→ Greuther Fürth (loan)	18	(1)
2020–2021	→ Dynamo Dresden (loan)	22	(0)
2022	Würzburger Kickers	14	(0)
2022–	Erzgebirge Aue	120	(27)

International career
2011	Germany U-17	2	(2)
2014–2015	Germany U20	11	(2)
2016	Germany U21	1	(0)
- * Club domestic league appearances and goals as of 30 May 2026

Marvin Stefaniak (born 3 February 1995) is a German professional footballer who plays as a midfielder for club Erzgebirge Aue.

== Career ==
=== Beginnings and Dynamo Dresden ===
Stefaniak began his career as a youth with SC Borea Dresden before joining Dynamo Dresden in 2011. He was promoted to the first team two years later, and made his debut in February 2014, as a substitute for Adam Sušac in a 3–2 defeat to FSV Frankfurt in the 2. Bundesliga.

=== VfL Wolfsburg ===
On 14 September 2016, VfL Wolfsburg announced the signing of Stefaniak from Dynamo Dresden for the following season for a transfer fee of €2 million. On 1 July 2017, Stefaniak left Dynamo Dresden to join his new club, Wolfsburg.

In May 2019, Greuther Fürth signed Stefaniak on a two-season loan deal. Following a largely underwhelming first season, Fürth tried to end the loan prematurely in July 2020, but was denied.

On 5 October 2020, the last day of the 2020 summer transfer window, Stefaniak re-joined former club Dynamo Dresden on loan for the 2020–21 season. His loan to Greuther Fürth was cut short.

=== Würzburger Kickers ===
On 17 January 2022, Stefaniak joined Würzburger Kickers. He made 14 league appearances for the club, as they suffered relegation to the Regionalliga Bayern.

=== Erzgebirge Aue ===
Stefaniak moved to 3. Liga club Erzgebirge Aue on 3 June 2022, signing a one-year deal with an option for an additional season.

== Career statistics ==
As of matches played on 28 August 2022

Appearances and goals by club, season and competition
Club	Season	League			Cup		Total		Ref.
Club	Season	Division	Apps	Goals	Apps	Goals	Apps	Goals	Ref.
Dynamo Dresden	2013–14	2. Bundesliga	8	0	0	0	8	0	
Dynamo Dresden	2014–15	3. Liga	32	2	3	0	35	2	
Dynamo Dresden	2015–16	3. Liga	34	4	0	0	34	4	
Dynamo Dresden	2016–17	2. Bundesliga	26	1	2	0	28	1	
Dynamo Dresden	Totals		100	7	5	0	105	7	—
Dynamo Dresden II	2014–15	NOFV-Oberliga Süd	2	2	—		2	2	
VfL Wolfsburg	2017–18	Bundesliga	0	0	0	0	0	0	—
VfL Wolfsburg	2018–19	Bundesliga	0	0	0	0	0	0	—
VfL Wolfsburg	Totals		0	0	0	0	0	0	—
VfL Wolfsburg II	2017–18	Regionalliga Nord	3	0	—		3	0	
1. FC Nürnberg (loan)	2017–18	2. Bundesliga	9	1	0	0	9	1	
Greuther Fürth (loan)	2019–20	2. Bundesliga	18	1	1	0	19	1	
Dynamo Dresden (loan)	2020–21	3. Liga	22	0	1	0	23	0	
Würzburger Kickers	2021–22	3. Liga	14	0	0	0	14	0	
Erzgebirge Aue	2022–23	3. Liga	6	2	1	0	7	2	
Career total			174	13	8	0	182	13	—
