= Rocco Milde =

German former footballer (born 1969)

Personal information
- Date of birth: 8 June 1969 (age 57)
- Place of birth: Pirna, East Germany
- Height: 1.85 m (6 ft 1 in)
- Position: Forward

Youth career
- –1983: Wismut Pirna-Copitz
- 1983–1987: Dynamo Dresden

Senior career*
| Years | Team | Apps | (Gls) |
| 1987–1989 | Dynamo Dresden II | 56 | (13) |
| 1987–1990 | Dynamo Dresden | 8 | (0) |
| 1989–1990 | → TSG Meißen | 4 | (2) |
| 1990 | → Stahl Riesa | 3 | (4) |
| 1990–1993 | VfL Bochum | 54 | (3) |
| 1993–1994 | Hannover 96 | 17 | (3) |
| 1994–1996 | Hansa Rostock | 37 | (10) |
| 1996–1998 | Dynamo Dresden | 56 | (27) |
| 1998–1999 | FSV Zwickau | 46 | (16) |
| 1999–2002 | Dresdner SC | 61 | (17) |
| 2002–2003 | Dynamo Dresden | 15 | (0) |
| 2003–2005 | VfL Pirna-Copitz | 18 | (6) |
| Total | | 373 | (103) |

International career
| | East Germany U-21 | 4 | |
- * Club domestic league appearances and goals

Rocco Milde (born 8 June 1969) is a German former professional footballer who played as a forward. Milde had a much-travelled career, but is best remembered as a Dynamo Dresden player, having had three separate spells with the club.

== Career ==
=== Early career ===
Milde began his career with Dynamo Dresden, and made his debut for the club in a DDR-Oberliga match against Hallescher FC Chemie in April 1988. He was on the fringes of the Dynamo team for the next two seasons as the club won two East German titles, as well as the FDGB Pokal in 1990. During the 1989–90 season he also turned out for TSG Meißen and Stahl Riesa, both of whom were acting as feeder clubs to Dynamo.

=== Bundesliga years ===
Like many players, Milde moved west after the fall of the Berlin Wall, joining Bundesliga side VfL Bochum in 1990. He spent over three years with Bochum, scoring three goals in 54 games, before leaving at the end of 1993, just after the club had been relegated to the 2. Bundesliga. He signed for Hannover 96, and scored on his debut, a 2–0 win over Rot-Weiß Essen. He made a further 16 appearances, scoring twice more, before signing for Hansa Rostock in July 1994. The 1994–95 season was the most successful of Milde's career to date – he scored nine goals in 21 appearances as the club won the 2. Bundesliga title. Rostock followed this up with an impressive sixth-place finish in the Bundesliga, but Milde was less involved, making sixteen appearances (mostly as a substitute) and scoring once.

=== Return to Saxony ===
In 1996 Milde re-joined Dynamo Dresden, who had since been demoted to the third-tier Regionalliga Nordost. He partnered another Dynamo veteran, Torsten Gütschow, for the next two seasons, and both scored prolifically, but the club were unable to return to the second tier. In 1998 Milde signed for FSV Zwickau, who had just been relegated to the Regionalliga Nordost, and formed a successful striking partnership with the Serbian forward Veselin Popovic. However, the Regionalliga was to be re-structured at the end of the 1999–2000 season, and this combined with a poor start meant that Zwickau were effectively relegated with the season half over. Many players left the club, with Milde joining Dresdner SC along with team-mates René Beuchel and René Groß.

At this time, DSC were the top club in Dresden: while Dynamo were being relegated to the Oberliga, Milde helped them to a second-place finish in the Regionalliga in 1999–2000. They finished 9th the following year, with Milde as top scorer (with nine goals), but after falling out of favour during the 2001–02 season he joined Dynamo Dresden for a third time.

Milde's return to Dynamo was a popular one, but was marred by injuries. The club won the 2002 NOFV-Oberliga Süd title in 2002, and beat Hertha BSC II in a playoff to earn promotion to the Regionalliga Nord. Milde made just nine appearances the following season, and left Dynamo for a final time in 2003. He played out the remainder of his career with amateur side VfL Pirna-Copitz, before retiring in 2005.

== Personal life ==
Milde's brother Tino was also a footballer, and his son Paul has just been promoted from Dynamo Dresden's youth team.

== Honours ==
Dynamo Dresden

- DDR-Oberliga: 1988–89, 1989–90
- FDGB-Pokal: 1989–90
- NOFV-Oberliga: 2001–02

Hansa Rostock

- 2. Bundesliga: 1994–95
