= Tammo Harder =

German footballer

Personal information
- Date of birth: 4 January 1994 (age 32)
- Place of birth: Dülmen, Germany
- Height: 1.74 m (5 ft 9 in)
- Position: Forward

Youth career
- 1998–2002: Fortuna Seppenrade
- 2002–2006: Borussia Dortmund
- 2006–2013: Schalke 04

Senior career*
| Years | Team | Apps | (Gls) |
| 2013–2016 | Borussia Dortmund II | 100 | (27) |
| 2016–2017 | Holstein Kiel | 3 | (1) |
| 2017 | → 1. FC Saarbrücken (loan) | 5 | (0) |
| 2018–2019 | SC Wiedenbrück | 16 | (1) |
| 2019–2020 | Lippstadt 08 | 10 | (0) |
| 2020- | Fortuna Seppenrade | | |

International career^{‡}
| 2013 | Germany U19 | 4 | (1) |
| 2014 | Germany U20 | 2 | (0) |
- * Club domestic league appearances and goals as of 3 November 2024 ‡ National team caps and goals as of 5 November 2024

Tammo Harder (born 4 January 1994) is a German professional footballer who plays as a forward for Fortuna Seppenrade.

== Career ==
=== Early career ===
Born in Dülmen, Harder began with SV Fortuna Seppenrade, but left for Borussia Dortmund's youth system at the age of eight in 2002. After four years in Dortmund's youth system, he joined rivals Schalke to play for their youth team, despite being a Dortmund fan. At Schalke, he would consistently be one of the best players and top scorers, winning the Under 19 Bundesliga in 2012 and scored 20 goals to win it again in the 2012/13 season.

=== Borussia Dortmund II ===
Harder returned to Dortmund in 2013, after running down his contract with Schalke, signing with Dortmund a contract valid until 2016. He made his professional debut in the 3. Liga with Borussia Dortmund II on 20 July 2013 against VfB Stuttgart II. As his contract was expiring, he attracted interest from numerous clubs in the summer of 2016, including various German clubs and Huddersfield, where his former coach David Wagner had gone to.

=== Holstein Kiel and Saarbrücken loan ===
Harder chose to sign with Holstein Kiel, with it being announced on 22 June 2016. He would score on his debut on 9 August 2016 against Sportfreunde Lotte in a 3-1 victory, but only made two more appearances over the rest of the season for Holstein Kiel. In the 2016–17 winter transfer window, he joined 1. FC Saarbrücken for the second half of the season. At Saarbrücken, he played 5 Regionalliga Südwest matches. In July 2017, Harder's contract at Holstein Kiel was terminated. However, there was not much interest for him in the summer, so Norbert Elgert, who coached him at Schalke, helped him train with the reserves and he also played with hometown club Fortuna Seppenrade.

=== Wiedenbrück ===
Harder signed for Regionalliga side SC Wiedenbrück in February 2018. On May 25, 2018, he extended his contract for one year after making 6 appearances with one goal in the second half of the 2017/18 season.

=== Lippstadt ===
Following Wiedenbrück's relegation in 2019, Harder signed for Lippstadt 08, taking the number seven. He made 10 appearances as an attacking midfielder but was not in the squad in 2020.

=== Return to Fortuna Seppenrade ===
Harder returned to his childhood club Fortuna Seppenrade in July 2020, who were now playing in the Kreisliga.

== International career ==
Harder has made 6 appearances for Germany's youth teams, scoring one goal in the Euro U19 against Ukraine in a 2-0 victory on 25 July 2014.
