= Patrick Wiegers =

German footballer (born 1990)

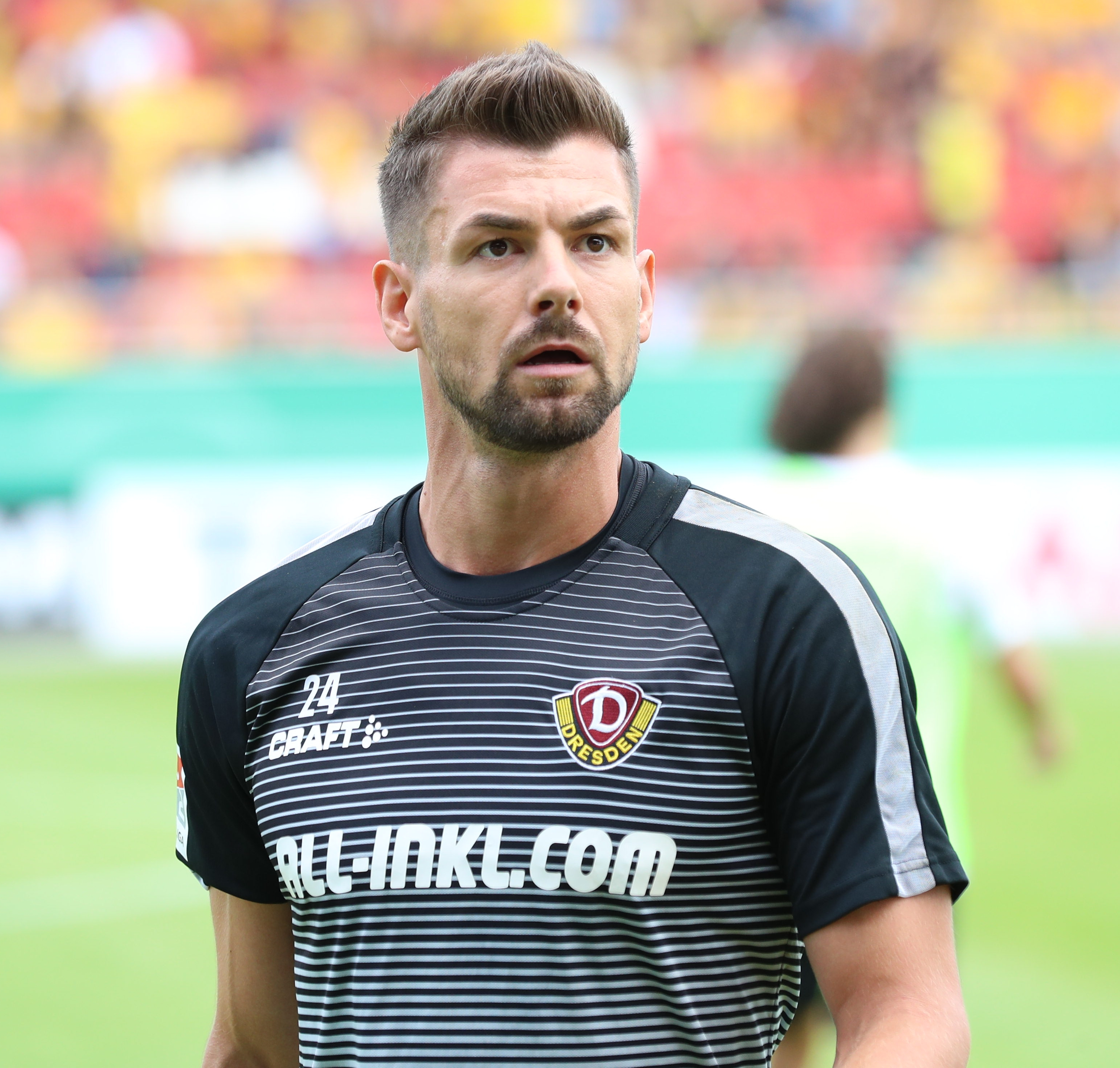
- Wiegers in 2019

Personal information
- Date of birth: 19 April 1990 (age 36)
- Place of birth: Deggendorf, West Germany
- Height: 1.88 m (6 ft 2 in)
- Position: Goalkeeper

Youth career
- –2008: SpVgg Grün-Weiss Deggendorf
- 2008–2010: Jahn Regensburg

Senior career*
Years	Team	Apps	(Gls)
2010–2014	Jahn Regensburg	28	(0)
2014–2022	Dynamo Dresden	23	(0)
- * Club domestic league appearances and goals

Patrick Wiegers (born 19 April 1990) is a German former professional footballer who played as a goalkeeper.

== Career ==
Wiegers was born in Deggendorf.

He made his professional debut with SSV Jahn Regensburg during the 2009–10 3. Liga season in a 2–0 away loss to SpVgg Unterhaching. With the exception of the first 13 games of the 2013–2014 season, he was a bench player who only occasionally filled in for the main goalkeeper. His contract was not extended beyond the end of this season.

Following his departure from Regensburg, he joined Dynamo Dresden shortly after the start of the 2014–2015 season. After being the squad's reserve keeper for the first twenty games of the season, he was promoted to the starting eleven following the mid-game injury of Benjamin Kirsten on 13 December 2014 in a game against Energie Cottbus. On 26 April 2015, Kirsten returned to his old position after being subbed in due to Wiegers having received a red card. Apart from a brief five-game interval at the end of the 2015–2016 season, this has been Wieger's only stint as Dresden's main keeper so far, as he acted as the club's secondary or tertiary keeper during the following seasons.
