= Benjamin Kirsten =

German footballer

Benny Kirsten
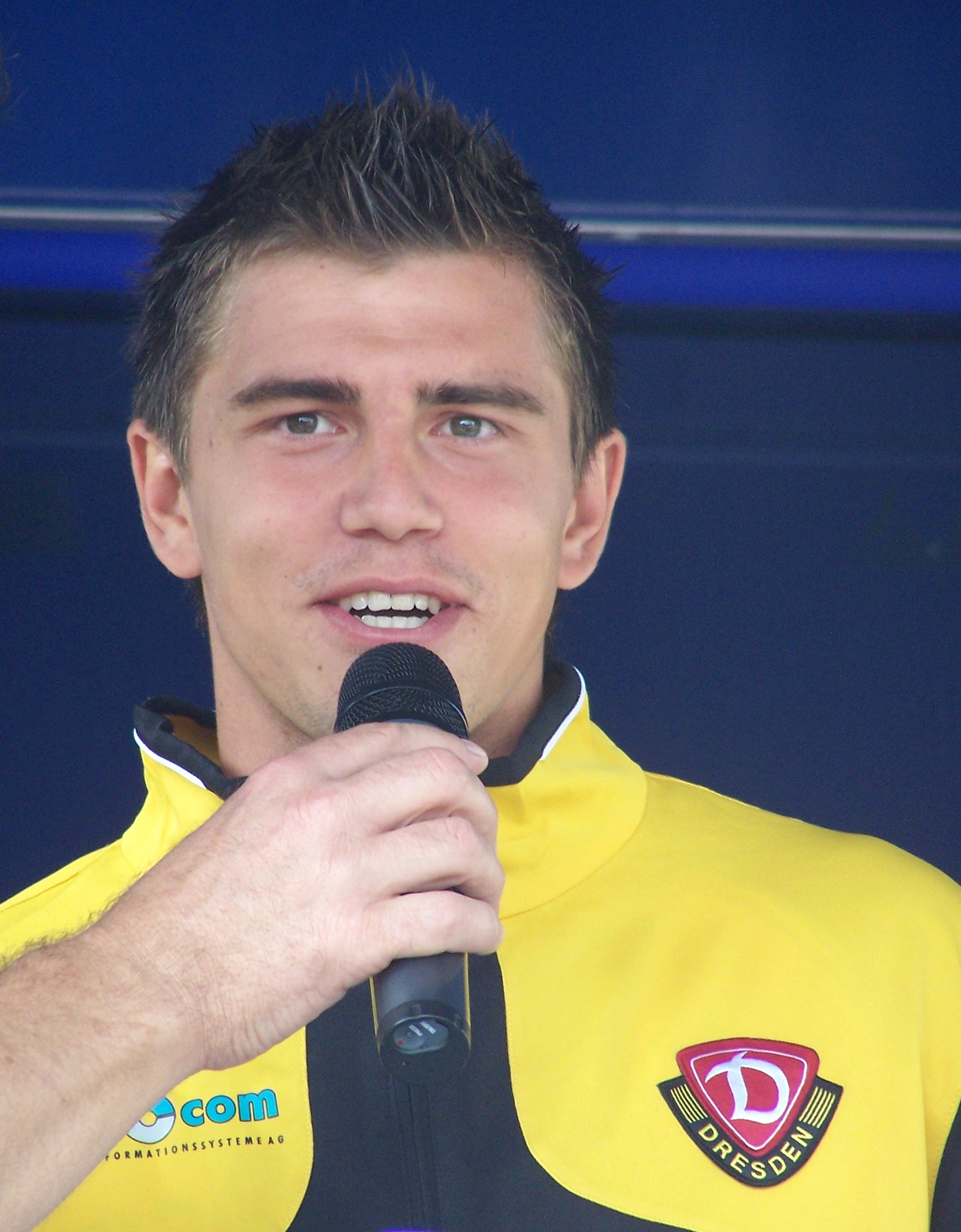
- Kirsten with Dynamo Dresden in 2008

Personal information
- Date of birth: 2 June 1987 (age 39)
- Place of birth: Riesa, East Germany
- Height: 1.82 m (6 ft 0 in)
- Position: Goalkeeper

Team information
- Current team: Dynamo Dresden (youth coach)

Youth career
- 1989–1990: Dynamo Dresden
- 1990–2006: Bayer Leverkusen

Senior career*
| Years | Team | Apps | (Gls) |
| 2006–2008 | Bayer Leverkusen II | 2 | (0) |
| 2008 | Waldhof Mannheim | 0 | (0) |
| 2008–2011 | Dynamo Dresden II | 35 | (0) |
| 2008–2015 | Dynamo Dresden | 123 | (0) |
| 2015 | NEC | 6 | (0) |
| 2016–2021 | Lokomotive Leipzig | 68 | (0) |
| Total | | 234 | (0) |

Managerial career
- 2022–: Dynamo Dresden (youth coach)
- * Club domestic league appearances and goals

Benjamin Kirsten (born 2 June 1987) is a German former professional footballer who played as a goalkeeper. He spent much of his active career with Dynamo Dresden and 1. FC Lokomotive Leipzig.

== Early life ==
Kirsten was born in Riesa, East Germany. In 1989, at the age of two, he began to play football at Dynamo Dresden and in July 1990 left with his father Ulf Kirsten for Bayer 04 Leverkusen where he played the following 16 years with the club's youth team.

== Career ==
In July 2006, Kirsten was promoted to the Bayer Leverkusen reserve squad in the Regionalliga. He played two games for the team who were coached by his father Ulf.

In January 2008, he left Bayer Leverkusen after 17 years and six months to join Waldhof Mannheim. On 16 June 2008, after only half a year with Waldhof he returned to Dynamo Dresden, where he made his debut – his first professional game – on 2 May 2009 against Fortuna Düsseldorf. Kirsten played the entire ninety minutes, conceding one goal.

In his first two years, Kirsten regularly featured for Dynamo Dresden II. He was part of the team that won the Sachsenliga and Sachsenpokal in 2009. Kirsten was involved in a controversy after the cup win, when he was seen lighting fireworks on the pitch. Dynamo had previously been punished for similar incidents from their fans, and Kirsten was suspended for three games and fined €4,000 (about £3,500).

On day 25 of the 2010–11 season team manager Matthias Maucksch made Kirsten the regular first-choice keeper of Dynamo Dresden. With his persuasive performances Kirsten had a major part in that Dynamo reached the third place at the end of the season and after beating VfL Osnabrück in the relegation matches promoted to the 2. Bundesliga.

Following this success, Kirsten remained Dynamo's substitute keeper behind Wolfgang Hesl but was promoted to the team's starting eleven in February 2012. He remained in this role for most of the 2012–13 through 2014–15 seasons, with his team being re-relegated to the 3. Liga in 2014. Kirsten eventually left Dynamo in 2015, after which he spent a season with Dutch side NEC Nijmegen; he appeared in six games for them.

Returning to Germany, Kirsten joined Regionalliga Nordost team Lok Leipzig in November 2016. After spending five years with the club, Kirsten retired in 2021, citing continuing issues related to his meniscus.

In January 2022, Kirsten was hired as a youth coach at his former club, Dynamo Dresden.

== Personal life ==
Benjamin Kirsten is the son of former Germany national team forward and three-time Bundesliga top scorer Ulf Kirsten. He was trained as a merchant in sports and fitness at Dynamo Dresden.
