= Dennis Engelman =

German footballer

Personal information
- Full name: Dennis Engelman
- Date of birth: 8 February 1995 (age 31)
- Place of birth: Germany
- Height: 1.74 m (5 ft 9 in)
- Position: Defender

Team information
- Current team: Bonner SC
- Number: 16

Youth career
- –2009: SV Schlebusch
- 2009–2014: Bayer Leverkusen

Senior career*
Years	Team	Apps	(Gls)
2014	Bayer Leverkusen II	1	(0)
2014–2017	Fortuna Köln	50	(1)
2017–2018	TSV Schott Mainz	4	(0)
2018–	Bonner SC	0	(0)

International career
2010	Germany U-15	2	(1)
2011	Germany U-19	4	(0)
- * Club domestic league appearances and goals as of 11 February 2018

Dennis Engelman (born 8 February 1995) is a German footballer who currently plays for Bonner SC.

== Career ==
Until 2014, Engelman played for the youth squad of Bayer Leverkusen. In the 2013–14 season he participated in the first season of the UEFA Youth League. He played in five of the six group games, where Leverkusen were eliminated. Furthermore, he played during this season with the second team of the club a game in the Regionalliga West. Engelman made his debut during the 3–0 victory against SG Wattenscheid 09, playing all 90 minutes. In the summer of 2014, Engelman moved to 3. Liga side Fortuna Köln. He made his debut on 6 August 2014, in a 2–0 win against Hallescher FC, coming on as a substitute in the 70th minute for Jan-André Sievers.

=== National team ===
Engelman played six games for the under-15 and under-16 sides of the Germany national team. He scored the final goal of the game in a 2–3 defeat on 13 May 2010 against the Poland under-15s.
