= Dominic Baumann =

German footballer

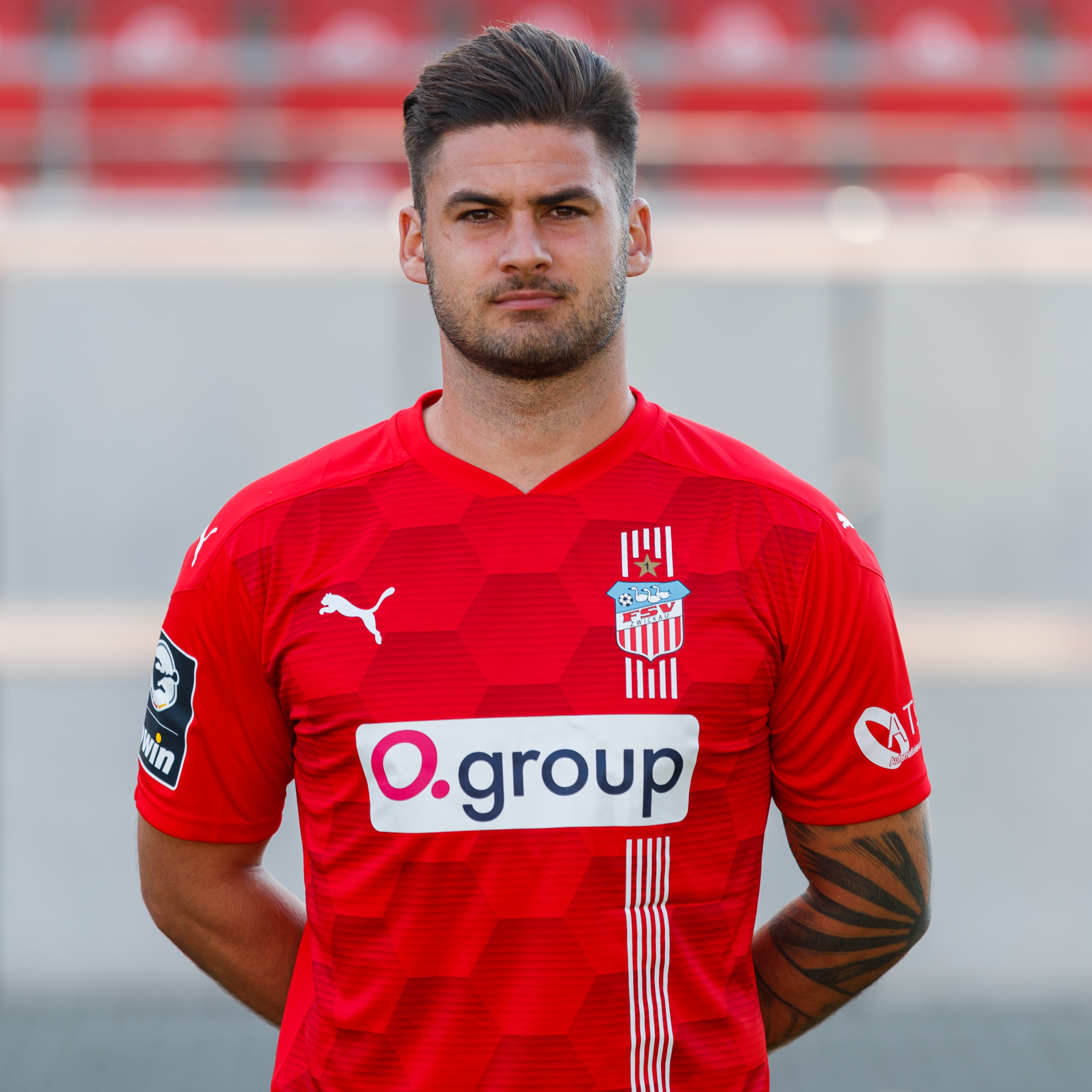
- Baumann with FSV Zwickau in 2021

Personal information
- Date of birth: 24 April 1995 (age 31)
- Place of birth: Oschatz, Germany
- Height: 1.78 m (5 ft 10 in)
- Positions: Forward; attacking midfielder

Team information
- Current team: 1. FC Saarbrücken
- Number: 30

Youth career
- 2001–2004: FSV Blau-Weiß Wermsdorf
- 2004–2007: Sachsen Leipzig
- 2007–2014: Dynamo Dresden

Senior career*
Years	Team	Apps	(Gls)
2014–2015	Dynamo Dresden	18	(0)
2015–2017	1. FC Nürnberg II	54	(21)
2015–2017	1. FC Nürnberg	4	(0)
2017–2021	Würzburger Kickers	129	(20)
2021–2023	FSV Zwickau	68	(25)
2023–2024	Hallescher FC	37	(15)
2024–2025	SV Sandhausen	33	(12)
2025–	1. FC Saarbrücken	22	(1)
- * Club domestic league appearances and goals as of 30 May 2026

Dominic Baumann (born 24 April 1995) is a German professional footballer who plays as a forward for 3. Liga club 1. FC Saarbrücken.

== Career ==
Baumann played for Würzburger Kickers from 2017 until 2021. He joined FSV Zwickau in 2021.

On 1 June 2023, Baumann signed a contract with Hallescher FC.

On 28 May 2024, Baumann moved to SV Sandhausen in 3. Liga.

On 16 July 2025, Baumann joined 1. FC Saarbrücken in 3. Liga.
