= Marc Wachs =

German footballer

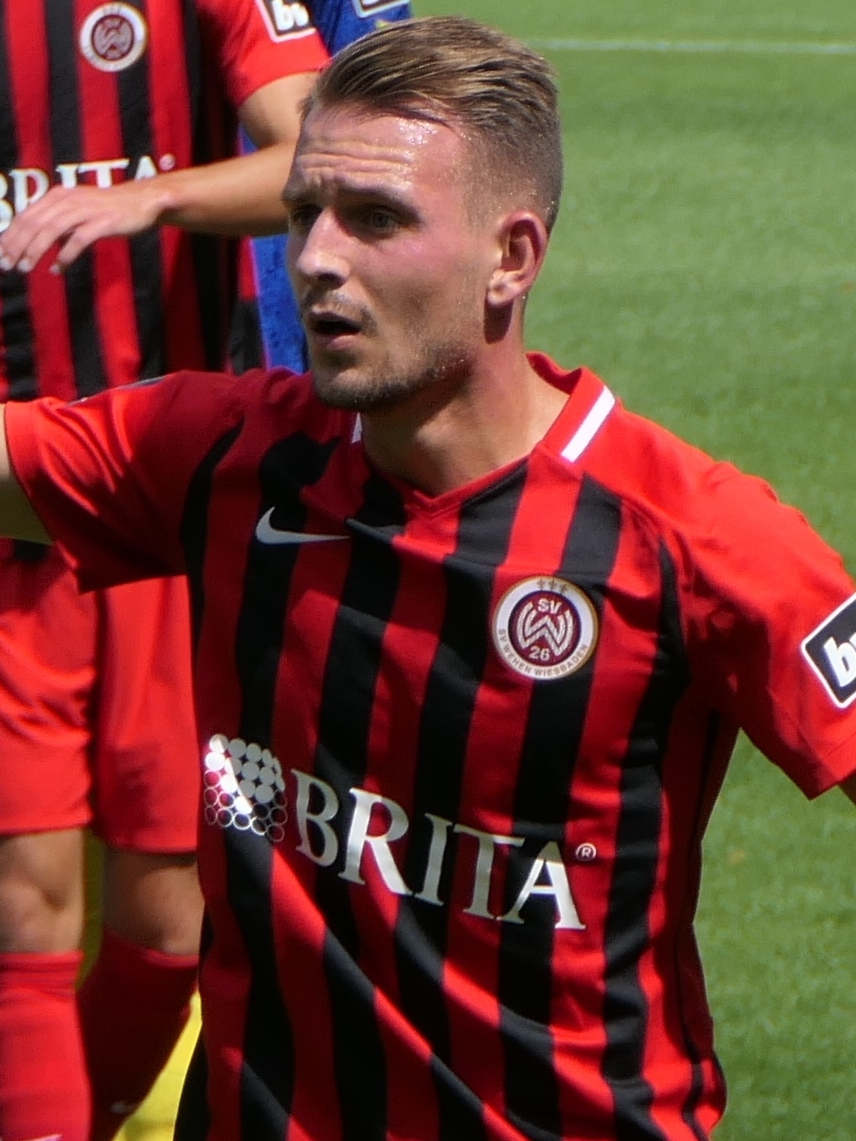
- Wachs with SV Wehen Wiesbaden in 2018

Personal information
- Date of birth: 10 July 1995 (age 31)
- Place of birth: Wiesbaden, Germany
- Height: 1.80 m (5 ft 11 in)
- Positions: Left-back; defensive midfielder

Team information
- Current team: Kickers Offenbach
- Number: 17

Youth career
- –2006: FSV Schierstein 08
- 2006–2007: SV Niedernhausen
- 2007–2014: Mainz 05

Senior career*
Years	Team	Apps	(Gls)
2014–2016	Mainz 05 II	44	(0)
2016–2018	Dynamo Dresden	0	(0)
2017–2018	→ VfL Osnabrück (loan)	28	(1)
2018–2020	SV Wehen Wiesbaden	10	(0)
2020–2022	Hessen Dreieich	33	(9)
2022–2023	Eintracht Frankfurt II	34	(14)
2024–	Kickers Offenbach	34	(10)
- * Club domestic league appearances and goals as of 26 June 2026

Marc Wachs (born 10 July 1995) is a German professional footballer who plays as a left-back or defensive midfielder for Kickers Offenbach.
