= Jean-François Kornetzky =

French footballer (born 1982)

Personal information
- Date of birth: 27 July 1982 (age 44)
- Place of birth: Wissembourg, France
- Height: 1.89 m (6 ft 2 in)
- Position: Goalkeeper

Youth career
- Lierse
- –2001: Strasbourg

Senior career*
Years	Team	Apps	(Gls)
2001–2002	RFC Liège		
2002–2003	Strasbourg B		
2003–2004	SR Colmar		
2004–2010	Karlsruher SC II	47	(0)
2004–2010	Karlsruher SC	17	(0)
2011	SV Sandhausen	5	(0)
2011–2012	SC Idar-Oberstein	23	(0)
2012–2013	SC Schiltigheim	22	(0)
2013–2015	Rot-Weiß Erfurt	1	(0)
2015–2017	Dynamo Dresden	2	(0)
2017–2018	SV Röchling Völklingen	14	(0)
2018	US Hostert		
- * Club domestic league appearances and goals

Jean-François Kornetzky (born 27 July 1982) is a French former professional footballer who played as a goalkeeper.
