= Stefan Kutschke =

German footballer

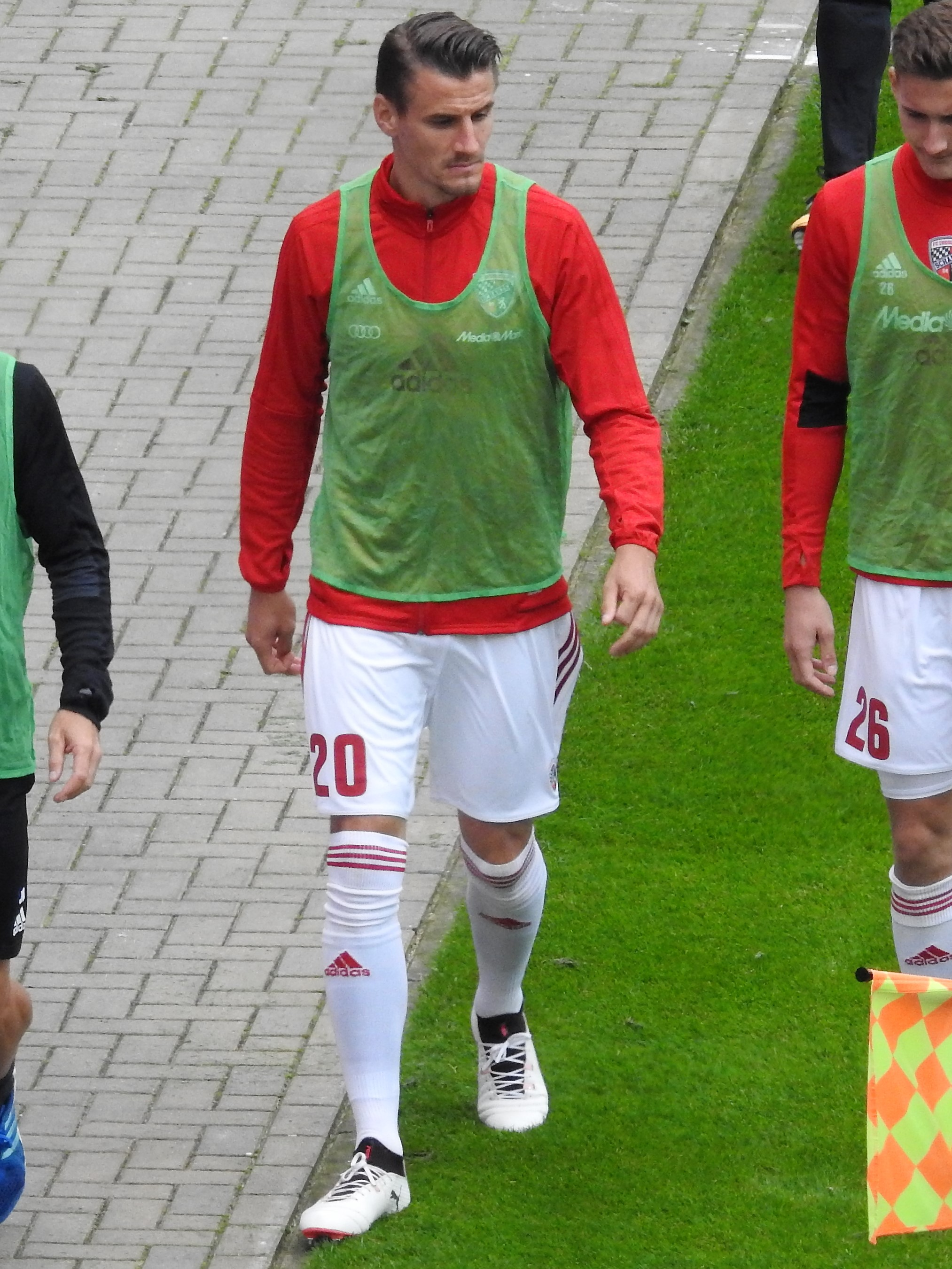
- Kutschke playing for FC Ingolstadt in 2017

Personal information
- Date of birth: 3 November 1988 (age 38)
- Place of birth: Dresden, East Germany
- Height: 1.94 m (6 ft 4 in)
- Position: Forward

Youth career
- 2005: SF 01 Dresden Nord
- 2005–2006: FV Dresden 06
- 2007: Dynamo Dresden

Senior career*
Years	Team	Apps	(Gls)
2007–2008	FV Dresden 06	29	(19)
2008–2010	SV Babelsberg 03	46	(8)
2010–2013	RB Leipzig	84	(27)
2013–2015	VfL Wolfsburg	8	(1)
2013–2015	→ VfL Wolfsburg II	6	(1)
2014–2015	→ SC Paderborn (loan)	19	(1)
2015–2017	1. FC Nürnberg	5	(0)
2015–2017	→ 1. FC Nürnberg II	7	(2)
2016–2017	→ Dynamo Dresden (loan)	47	(19)
2017–2022	FC Ingolstadt	156	(38)
2022–2026	Dynamo Dresden	130	(31)
- * Club domestic league appearances and goals

Stefan Kutschke (born 3 November 1988) is a German former professional footballer who played as a forward.

== Career ==
In May 2026 Kutschke announced he would retire from playing at the end of the 2025–26 season.

== Career statistics ==
As of match played 12 May 2019

Appearances and goals by club, season and competition
Club	Season	League			Cup		Other		Total	
Club	Season	Division	Apps	Goals	Apps	Goals	Apps	Goals	Apps	Goals
Babelsberg 03	2008–09	Regionalliga Nord	20	4	0	0	—		20	4
Babelsberg 03	2009–10	Regionalliga Nord	26	4	1	0	—		27	4
Babelsberg 03	Total		46	8	1	0	0	0	47	8
RB Leipzig	2010–11	Regionalliga Nord	28	4	0	0	—		28	4
RB Leipzig	2011–12	Regionalliga Nord	28	13	2	0	—		30	13
RB Leipzig	2012–13	Regionalliga Nordost	28	10	0	0	—		28	10
RB Leipzig	Total		84	27	2	0	0	0	86	27
VfL Wolfsburg	2013–14	Bundesliga	8	1	1	0	—		9	1
VfL Wolfsburg II	2013–14	Regionalliga Nord	6	1	—		—		6	1
SC Paderborn (loan)	2014–15	Bundesliga	19	1	1	0	—		20	1
1. FC Nürnberg	2015–16	2. Bundesliga	5	0	1	0	—		6	0
1. FC Nürnberg II	2015–16	Regionalliga Bayern	7	2	—		—		7	2
Dynamo Dresden (loan)	2015–16	3. Liga	15	3	0	0	—		15	3
Dynamo Dresden (loan)	2016–17	2. Bundesliga	32	16	2	2	—		34	18
Dynamo Dresden (loan)	Total		47	19	2	2	0	0	49	21
Ingolstadt 04	2017–18	2. Bundesliga	31	7	2	1	—		33	8
Ingolstadt 04	2018–19	2. Bundesliga	30	3	1	0	—		31	3
Ingolstadt 04	Total		61	10	3	1	0	0	64	11
Career total			283	69	11	3	0	0	294	72
