= Giuliano Modica =

Argentine footballer

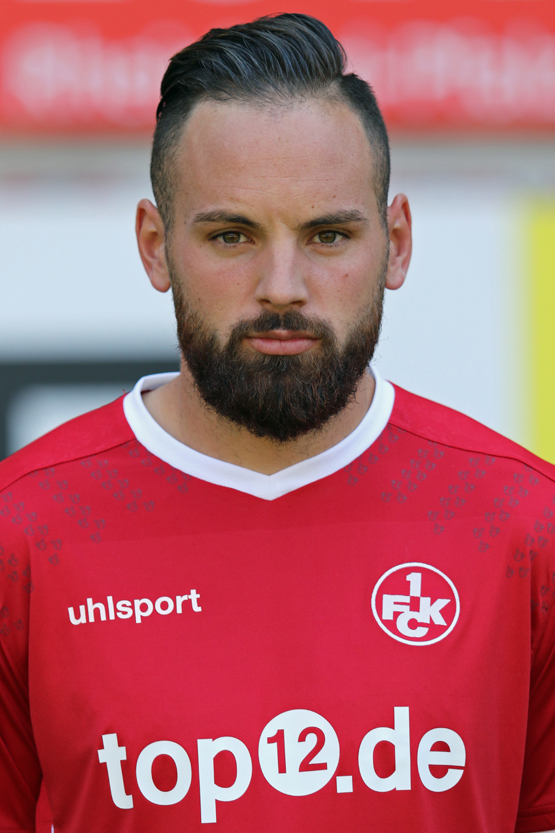
- Modica in 2017.

Personal information
- Date of birth: 12 March 1991 (age 35)
- Place of birth: Córdoba, Argentina
- Height: 1.83 m (6 ft 0 in)
- Position: Defender

Youth career
- SG Rosenhöhe
- 2007–2010: Kickers Offenbach

Senior career*
Years	Team	Apps	(Gls)
2010–2012	Kaiserslautern II	46	(2)
2012–2013	Eintracht Frankfurt II	27	(6)
2013–2015	Kickers Offenbach	59	(7)
2015–2017	Dynamo Dresden	56	(2)
2017–2018	Kaiserslautern	5	(0)
2018–2019	Wehen Wiesbaden	7	(0)
2019–2022	Mainz 05 II	72	(2)

Managerial career
- 2026: Wehen Wiesbaden (interim)
- * Club domestic league appearances and goals

Giuliano Modica (born 12 March 1991) is an Argentine former professional footballer who played as a defender and is the current intermin manager of Wehen Wiesbaden.
