= Nils Teixeira =

German footballer

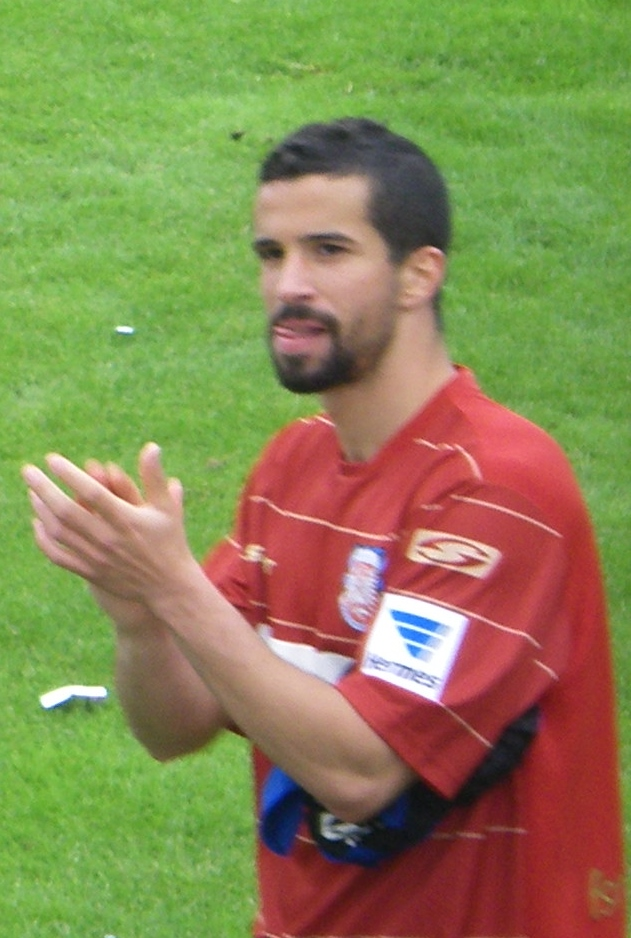
- Teixeira playing for FSV Frankfurt in 2013

Personal information
- Date of birth: 10 July 1990 (age 36)
- Place of birth: Bonn, West Germany
- Height: 1.76 m (5 ft 9 in)
- Position: Left-back

Youth career
- 2005: Bonner SC
- 2005–2008: Bayer Leverkusen

Senior career*
Years	Team	Apps	(Gls)
2008–2010	Bayer Leverkusen II	2	(0)
2009–2010	→ Kickers Offenbach (loan)	34	(0)
2010–2011	Kickers Offenbach	39	(1)
2011–2014	FSV Frankfurt	90	(2)
2014–2017	Dynamo Dresden	65	(3)
2017–2018	Arminia Bielefeld	9	(0)
2018–2020	AEL Limassol	35	(4)
2020–2022	Bonner SC	63	(4)
2022–2024	SV Eintracht Hohkeppel	49	(2)
Total		386	(16)

International career
2005–2006	Germany U16	7	(0)
2006–2007	Germany U17	25	(0)
2007–2008	Germany U18	5	(0)
2008–2009	Germany U19	12	(0)
2009–2011	Germany U20	9	(0)
- * Club domestic league appearances and goals

Nils Teixeira (born 10 July 1990) is a German former professional footballer who played as a left-back.

== Club career ==
In July 2018, Teixeira joined Cypriot side AEL Limassol.

== International career ==
Teixeira was born in Germany to parents of Portuguese descent. He is a youth international for Germany at various levels.
