= Paul Milde (footballer) =

German footballer

Personal information
- Date of birth: 25 January 1995 (age 31)
- Place of birth: Pirna, Germany
- Height: 1.78 m (5 ft 10 in)
- Position: Forward

Team information
- Current team: Dynamo Dresden II

Youth career
- –2010: SC Borea Dresden
- 2010–2013: Dynamo Dresden

Senior career*
Years	Team	Apps	(Gls)
2013–2015	Dynamo Dresden	3	(0)
2014–2015	Dynamo Dresden II	21	(3)
2015–2016	Union Fürstenwalde	29	(10)
2016–2018	Budissa Bautzen	49	(3)
2018–2021	Chemnitzer FC	76	(2)
2021–2022	TSV Steinbach	16	(1)
2022	Kickers Offenbach	14	(1)
2022–2025	Energie Cottbus	16	(0)
2025–	Dynamo Dresden II	0	(0)
- * Club domestic league appearances and goals as of 20 May 2025

Paul Milde (born 25 January 1995) is a German footballer who plays as a forward for Dynamo Dresden II.

== Career ==
Milde began his career as a youth with SC Borea Dresden, where his father Rocco was working as a coach, before joining Dynamo Dresden in 2010. He was promoted to the first team three years later, and made his debut in November 2013, as a substitute for Cheikh Gueye in a 3–0 defeat to Karlsruher SC in the 2. Bundesliga.

== Personal life ==
Milde's father, Rocco, and uncle, Tino, were both footballers. Both were also forwards, and Rocco had three spells with Dynamo Dresden.
