= Luca Dürholtz =

German footballer

Personal information
- Date of birth: 18 August 1993 (age 33)
- Place of birth: Wermelskirchen, Germany
- Height: 1.78 m (5 ft 10 in)
- Position: Midfielder

Team information
- Current team: 1. FC Köln II
- Number: 8

Youth career
- –2003: SG Hackenberg
- 2003–2012: Bayer Leverkusen

Senior career*
Years	Team	Apps	(Gls)
2012–2014	Bayer Leverkusen II	74	(10)
2014–2016	Dynamo Dresden	36	(2)
2014	Dynamo Dresden II	1	(1)
2016–2018	Holstein Kiel	15	(0)
2017	Holstein Kiel II	4	(0)
2018–2021	SV Elversberg	95	(20)
2021–2022	Rot-Weiss Essen	35	(3)
2022–2025	SV Elversberg	46	(1)
2025–	1. FC Köln II	24	(0)

International career
2008–2009	Germany U16	10	(1)
2009–2010	Germany U17	9	(0)
- * Club domestic league appearances and goals as of 18:45, 4 June 2026 (UTC)

Luca Dürholtz (born 18 August 1993) is a German professional footballer who plays as a midfielder for Regionalliga club 1. FC Köln II.
