= Justin Eilers (footballer) =

German footballer (born 1988)

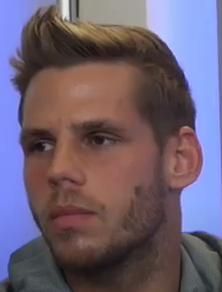
- Eilers in 2014

Personal information
- Date of birth: 13 June 1988 (age 38)
- Place of birth: Braunschweig, West Germany
- Height: 1.84 m (6 ft 0 in)
- Position: Forward

Youth career
- 2000–2002: Eintracht Braunschweig
- 2002–2003: Braunschweiger SC
- 2003–2005: Eintracht Braunschweig
- 2005–2006: Braunschweiger SC

Senior career*
Years	Team	Apps	(Gls)
2006–2007	FT Braunschweig	29	(17)
2007–2009	Eintracht Braunschweig II	54	(28)
2008–2009	Eintracht Braunschweig	9	(0)
2009–2011	VfL Bochum II	44	(13)
2011–2013	Goslarer SC	45	(29)
2013–2014	VfL Wolfsburg II	32	(17)
2014–2016	Dynamo Dresden	74	(42)
2016–2018	Werder Bremen	0	(0)
2017–2018	Werder Bremen II	16	(5)
2018–2019	Apollon Smyrnis	1	(0)
2019	Sportfreunde Lotte	2	(0)
2020–2021	SC Verl	18	(5)
2021–2022	Hallescher FC	11	(0)
2022–2023	Germania Halberstadt	17	(2)
Total		352	(158)
- * Club domestic league appearances and goals

Justin Eilers (born 13 June 1988) is a German former professional footballer who played as a forward.

== Career ==
Born in Braunschweig, Eilers made his professional debut on 13 September 2008 for hometown club Eintracht Braunschweig in a match against Kickers Offenbach.

After leaving Braunschweig in 2009, Eilers went back into semi-professional football until signing with Dynamo Dresden of the 3. Liga on 20 June 2014. He was voted "Player of the Season" for the 2015–16 3. Liga season.

In April 2016, Werder Bremen announced Eilers would be joining the club on a three-year contract in the summer. In the first half of the 2016–17 season, he suffered from a hip injury and underwent a groin operation which, in connection with the resulting training deficit, kept him out of action. In the second half of the season, he played in the club's reserves to regain fitness and match practice before he suffered another injury tearing his anterior cruciate and medial collateral ligaments in May 2017.

In June 2018 Apollon Smyrnis announced the signing of Eilers. In December, after making one appearance which came on the season's first matchday, he agreed the termination of his contract.

On 24 January 2019, Eilers signed a contract with Sportfreunde Lotte for the rest of the season. Due to persistent hip problems he was limited to two substitute appearances and left the club at the end of the season.

In September 2020, Eilers moved to SC Verl, newly promoted to the 3. Liga, on a one-year contract with an optional extension.

In the 2021–22 season he played for Hallescher FC.

Eilers joined Regionalliga Nordost side Germania Halberstadt in August 2022.

He announced his retirement from playing in May 2023.

== Personal life ==
In November 2019, Eilers announced he had registered as insolvent.

== Honours ==
Individual

- 3. Liga top scorer: 2016
