= Marco Hartmann =

German footballer

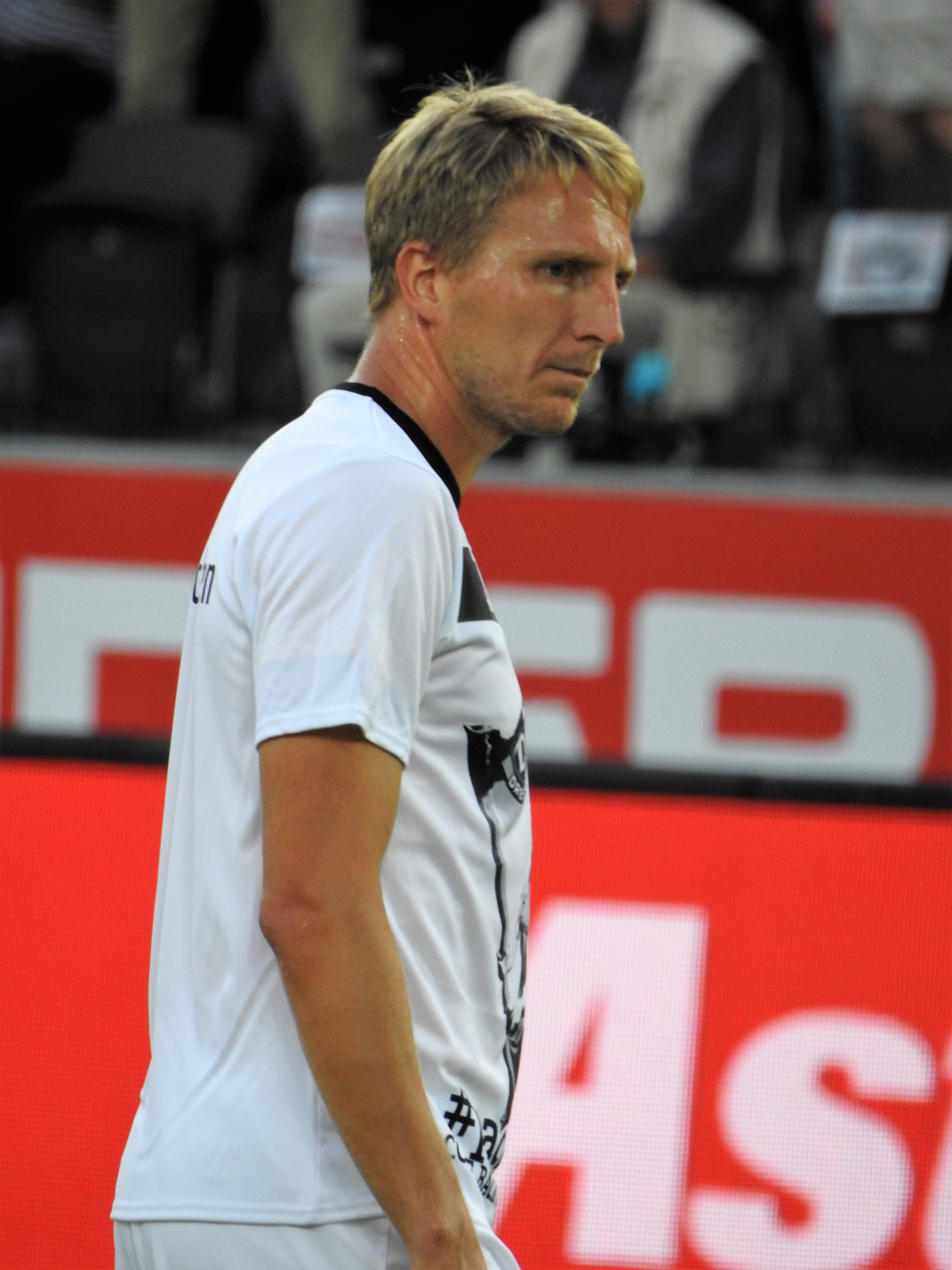
- Hartmann with Dynamo Dresden in 2017

Personal information
- Date of birth: 25 February 1988 (age 38)
- Place of birth: Leinefelde, East Germany
- Height: 1.94 m (6 ft 4 in)
- Position: Defensive midfielder

Youth career
- –2006: SC Leinefelde
- 2006–2007: Hallescher FC

Senior career*
Years	Team	Apps	(Gls)
2007–2013	Hallescher FC	117	(15)
2013–2021	Dynamo Dresden	139	(17)
2013	→ Dynamo Dresden II	1	(0)
- * Club domestic league appearances and goals as of 13:33, 12 August 2021 (UTC)

Marco Hartmann (born 25 February 1988) is a German professional footballer who most recently played as a defensive midfielder for Dynamo Dresden.

== Career ==
Hartmann came through Hallescher FC's youth system, and was promoted to the first team in 2007. He was a key part of the team that earned promotion to the 3. Liga in 2012 and played in the club's first game at this level, scoring the only goal in a 1–0 win over Kickers Offenbach.

Hartmann signed for Dynamo Dresden at the end of the 2012–13 season. Despite repeatedly struggling with numerous injuries, he quickly rose to become one of the team's leaders and was made team captain in 2016, following the departure of Michael Hefele.
