= Marcel Hilßner =

German footballer

Personal information
- Full name: Marcel Hilßner
- Date of birth: 30 January 1995 (age 31)
- Place of birth: Leipzig, Germany
- Height: 1.83 m (6 ft 0 in)
- Position: Winger

Team information
- Current team: FC Verden 04

Youth career
- 2000–2004: SG Rotation Leipzig
- 2004–2009: FC Sachsen Leipzig
- 2009–2015: Werder Bremen

Senior career*
Years	Team	Apps	(Gls)
2013–2016	Werder Bremen II	78	(19)
2015–2016	Werder Bremen	1	(0)
2016–2017	Dynamo Dresden	8	(0)
2017–2019	Hansa Rostock	39	(6)
2019–2020	SC Paderborn	0	(0)
2020	→ Hallescher FC (loan)	14	(2)
2020–2023	Coventry City	0	(0)
2021	→ Oldham Athletic (loan)	20	(1)
2022	→ FSV Zwickau (loan)	8	(0)
2023–2024	Chemie Leipzig	27	(2)
2024–	FC Verden 04	0	(0)

International career
2010–2011	Germany U16	6	(4)
2011–2012	Germany U17	11	(1)
2012–2013	Germany U18	6	(2)
2013	Germany U19	3	(0)
- * Club domestic league appearances and goals as of 18:21, 4 July 2024 (UTC)

Marcel Hilßner (born 30 January 1995) is a German professional footballer who plays as a winger for FC Verden 04. He is a former German youth international having represented his nation from U16 to U19 level between 2010 and 2013.

== Club career ==
=== Werder Bremen ===
Hilßner spent his formative years at FC Sachsen Leipzig before being signed by Werder Bremen in 2009. Having impressed at youth level from then on, he was awarded a year extension on a senior contract with the club on 8 June 2015. Hilßner made his senior debut for Bremen on 26 September in a 3–0 loss to Bayer Leverkusen, being brought on by manager Viktor Skripnik as a second-half substitute for Levin Öztunalı; it was the only senior appearance he made for the club before joining Dynamo Dresden in 2016. In his last match with Werder Bremen's reserve team, he scored twice in a 2–1 win over VfR Aalen which secured the side's survival in 3. Liga.

=== Dynamo Dresden ===
On 25 April 2016, it was announced that Hilßner would be joining Dynamo Dresden on a free transfer at the end of the season and that he had signed a three-year deal with the newly promoted German Second Division side. He made his debut for the club on 4 November 2016, coming on as an 88th-minute substitute for Erich Berko in a 3–0 win over Fortuna Düsseldorf. He registered his first assist on 4 April 2017, setting up Erich Berko for the equalizer in Dresden's 2–1 win over Heidenheim.

=== Hansa Rostock ===
On 7 August 2017, Hilßner joined 3. Liga side Hansa Rostock on a two-year deal. He scored his first goal for the club on 20 October, netting in a 2–0 win over VfL Osnabrück. Later in the season, he suffered a torn cruciate ligament which ruled him out for the remainder of the campaign.

=== SC Paderborn ===
On 28 May 2019, Hilßner joined SC Paderborn on a two-year deal.

On 28 January 2020, Hilßner was loaned out to Hallescher FC for the remainder of the 2019–20 season.

=== Coventry City ===
Hilßner joined Coventry City on 16 July 2020 on a three-year deal.

On 31 January 2023, Hilßner left Coventry without even managing to make a single senior appearance.

==== Loan to Oldham Athletic ====
During the 2021 January transfer window, Marcel joined Oldham Athletic on loan for the remainder of the season.

==== Loan to FSV Zwickau ====
On 26 January 2022, Hilßner joined 3. Liga side FSV Zwickau on loan until the end of the season.

== Career statistics ==
As of match played 16 April 2022

Appearances and goals by club, season and competition
Club	Season	League			Cup		League Cup		Other		Total	
Club	Season	Division	Apps	Goals	Apps	Goals	Apps	Goals	Apps	Goals	Apps	Goals
Werder Bremen II	2013–14	Regionalliga	25	2	—		—		—		25	2
Werder Bremen II	2014–15	Regionalliga	27	10	—		—		1 (Note: Appearance in the 2014–15 Regionalliga Promotion play-offs)	0	28	10
Werder Bremen II	2015–16	3. Liga	26	7	—		—		—		26	7
Werder Bremen II	Total		78	19	0	0	0	0	1	0	79	19
Werder Bremen	2015–16	Bundesliga	1	0	0	0	—		—		1	0
Dynamo Dresden	2016–17	2. Bundesliga	8	0	0	0	—		—		8	0
Dynamo Dresden	2017–18	2. Bundesliga	0	0	0	0	—		—		0	0
Dynamo Dresden	Total		8	0	0	0	0	0	0	0	8	0
Hansa Rostock	2017–18	3. Liga	18	4	1	0	—		—		19	4
Hansa Rostock	2018–19	3. Liga	21	2	1	0	—		—		22	2
Hansa Rostock	Total		39	6	2	0	0	0	0	0	41	6
Paderborn 07	2019–20	Bundesliga	0	0	0	0	—		—		0	0
Hallescher FC (loan)	2019–20	3. Liga	14	2	0	0	—		—		14	2
Coventry City	2020–21	Championship	0	0	0	0	0	0	—		0	0
Coventry City	2021–22	Championship	0	0	0	0	0	0	—		0	0
Coventry City	2022-23	Championship	0	0	0	0	0	0	—		0	0
Coventry City	Total		0	0	0	0	0	0	0	0	0	0
Oldham Athletic (loan)	2020–21	League Two	20	1	0	0	0	0	—		20	1
FSV Zwickau (loan)	2021–22	3. Liga	8	0	0	0	0	0	—		8	0
Career total			168	28	2	0	0	0	1	0	171	28
