= Sinan Tekerci =

Turkish footballer

Personal information
- Full name: Sinan Philipp Tekerci
- Date of birth: 22 September 1993 (age 33)
- Place of birth: Freudenstadt, Germany
- Height: 1.71 m (5 ft 7 in)
- Position: Midfielder

Team information
- Current team: Eintracht Trier
- Number: 22

Youth career
- 1996–1998: SG Dornstetten
- 1998–2001: TSG Balingen
- 2001–2006: TuS Ergenzingen
- 2006–2010: Stuttgarter Kickers
- 2011–2012: 1. FC Nürnberg

Senior career*
Years	Team	Apps	(Gls)
2011–2014	1. FC Nürnberg II	62	(4)
2014	1. FC Nürnberg	1	(0)
2014–2017	Dynamo Dresden	50	(6)
2016–2017	→ Preußen Münster (loan)	31	(4)
2017–2018	FSV Zwickau	9	(1)
2018–2023	SV Elversberg	115	(20)
2023–2025	Stuttgarter Kickers	50	(4)
2025–	Eintracht Trier	28	(2)

International career^{‡}
2012	Turkey U19	3	(0)
2012–2013	Turkey U20	5	(0)
- * Club domestic league appearances and goals as of 24 September 2026 ‡ National team caps and goals as of 11 May 2014

Sinan Philipp Tekerci (born 22 September 1993) is a footballer who plays for Regionalliga club Eintracht Trier. Born in Germany, he represented Turkey at youth level.

== Club career ==
He made his Bundesliga debut for 1. FC Nürnberg on 10 May 2014.

On 8 June 2023, Tekerci moved to Stuttgarter Kickers.
