= Michael Hefele =

German footballer (born 1990)

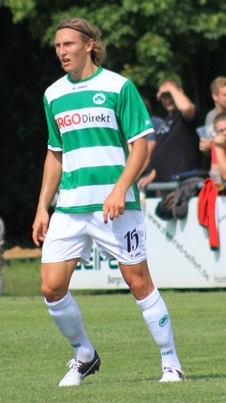
- Hefele playing for Greuther Fürth in 2012

Personal information
- Full name: Michael Martin Hefele
- Date of birth: 1 September 1990 (age 36)
- Place of birth: Pfaffenhofen an der Ilm, West Germany
- Height: 1.93 m (6 ft 4 in)
- Position: Centre-back

Senior career*
Years	Team	Apps	(Gls)
2009–2012	SpVgg Unterhaching II	43	(5)
2010–2012	SpVgg Unterhaching	33	(1)
2012–2014	Greuther Fürth II	13	(0)
2012–2014	Greuther Fürth	3	(0)
2014	→ Wacker Burghausen (loan)	15	(0)
2014–2016	Dynamo Dresden	69	(10)
2016–2018	Huddersfield Town	39	(3)
2018–2021	Nottingham Forest	15	(0)
Total		230	(19)
- * Club domestic league appearances and goals

Michael Martin Hefele (German: [ˈheːfələ]; born 1 September 1990) is a German former professional footballer who played as a centre-back, and currently serves as assistant coach of the Tunisia national football team.

== Career ==
=== In Germany ===
Hefele made his debut for SpVgg Unterhaching in 2010. He went on to play for SpVgg Greuther Fürth and was on loan at Wacker Burghausen. He played two seasons for Dynamo Dresden scoring ten times in 72 appearances in all competitions and became the club captain.

=== In England ===
==== Huddersfield Town ====
In July 2016, Hefele joined Huddersfield Town.Hefele scored his first goal for Huddersfield in a 1–1 draw with Aston Villa on 16 August 2016, just 26 seconds after coming off the bench, a Huddersfield record for the quickest time scored by a debutante in the club's 108-year history. On 28 January 2017, in a game against Rochdale, Hefele was substituted on as a striker in the 46th minute, coming on for Elias Kachunga. He then scored two goals as striker. Eight days later, on 5 February 2017, Hefele scored the winning goal in the 89th minute in a 2–1 victory against Leeds United.

==== Nottingham Forest ====
On 9 August 2018, Hefele joined English Championship side Nottingham Forest for an undisclosed fee. He made his debut for Forest on 14 August 2018 in the first round of the 2018–19 EFL Cup against Bury. The game finished 1–1 after 90 minutes with Forest going through to the second round 10–9 on penalties, one of which Hefele scored for Forest. Hefele was frozen out of the Forest first team squad, making his last appearance for the club on 1 January 2019. He saw out his contract and was officially released at the end of the 2020–21 season.

On 25 July 2021, Hefele announced his retirement from playing professional football due to "medical reasons".

== Post-retirement ==
On 26 July 2021, one day after announcing his retirement, he rejoined Huddersfield Town in a newly created role combining coaching with hospitality and ambassadorial roles at the club. On 23 December 2022 he joined Carlos Corberán at West Bromwich Albion in a First Team Assistant Coach role under Corberán.

== Career statistics ==
Appearances and goals by club, season and competition
Club	Season	League			National cup		League cup		Other		Total	
Club	Season	Division	Apps	Goals	Apps	Goals	Apps	Goals	Apps	Goals	Apps	Goals
SpVgg Unterhaching	2010–11	3. Liga	27	0	0	0	—		—		27	0
SpVgg Unterhaching	2011–12	3. Liga	6	1	0	0	—		—		6	1
SpVgg Unterhaching	Total		33	1	0	0	0	0	0	0	33	1
Greuther Fürth II	2012–13	Regionalliga Bayern	8	0	—		—		—		8	0
Greuther Fürth II	2013–14	Regionalliga Bayern	5	0	—		—		—		5	0
Greuther Fürth II	Total		13	0	0	0	0	0	0	0	13	0
Greuther Fürth	2012–13	Bundesliga	1	0	0	0	—		—		1	0
Greuther Fürth	2013–14	2. Bundesliga	2	0	0	0	—		—		2	0
Greuther Fürth	Total		3	0	0	0	0	0	0	0	3	0
Wacker Burghausen (loan)	2013–14	3. Liga	15	0	0	0	—		—		15	0
Dynamo Dresden	2014–15	3. Liga	31	3	3	0	—		—		34	3
Dynamo Dresden	2015–16	3. Liga	38	7	0	0	—		—		38	7
Dynamo Dresden	Total		69	10	3	0	0	0	0	0	72	10
Huddersfield Town	2016–17	Championship	37	3	1	2	1	0	3	0	42	5
Huddersfield Town	2017–18	Premier League	2	0	2	0	2	0	0	0	6	0
Huddersfield Town	Total		39	3	3	2	3	0	3	0	48	5
Nottingham Forest	2018–19	Championship	15	0	0	0	3	0	—		18	0
Nottingham Forest	2019–20	Championship	0	0	0	0	0	0	—		0	0
Nottingham Forest	Total		15	0	0	0	3	0	—		18	0
Career total			187	14	6	2	6	0	3	0	202	16

== Honours ==
Huddersfield Town

- EFL Championship play-offs: 2017
