= 2023–24 Arminia Bielefeld season =

Arminia Bielefeld
2023–24 season
- President: Hans-Jürgen Laufer
- Head coach: Michél Kniat
- Stadium: SchücoArena
- 3. Liga: 14th
- DFB-Pokal: Second round (eliminated by Hamburg)
- Westphalian Cup: Winners
- Average home league attendance: 18,640
- Biggest win: 4–0 vs Preußen Münster
- Biggest defeat: 3–1 vs Dynamo Dresden
Home colours	Away colours	Third colours

The 2023–24 season was Arminia Bielefeld's 119th season in existence and first one back in the 3. Liga. They also competed in the DFB-Pokal.

== Players ==
=== First-team squad ===
As of 31 August 2023

Note: Flags indicate national team as defined under FIFA eligibility rules; some limited exceptions apply. Players may hold more than one non-FIFA nationality.

No.	Pos.	Nation	Player
1	GK	GER	Jonas Kersken (on loan from Borussia Mönchengladbach)
4	DF	GER	Louis Oppie
5	DF	GER	Semi Belkahia
6	DF	GER	Can Özkan
7	MF	GER	Nicklas Shipnoski
8	MF	GER	Sam Schreck
9	FW	GER	Fabian Klos (captain)
10	MF	MAR	Nassim Boujellab
11	FW	GER	Aygün Yıldırım
17	MF	GER	Merveille Biankadi
19	MF	GER	Maximilian Großer
20	MF	GER	Tom Geerkens
21	MF	RUS	Vladislav Cherny

No.	Pos.	Nation	Player
22	GK	GER	Leo Oppermann (on loan from Hamburger SV)
23	DF	GER	Leon Schneider
24	DF	GER	Christopher Lannert
25	MF	JPN	Kaito Mizuta
27	DF	GER	Gerrit Gohlke
28	MF	GER	Lucas Kiewitt
29	FW	GER	Henrik Koch
30	MF	GER	Henry Obermeyer
34	MF	GER	Leandro Putaro (on loan from VfL Osnabrück)
37	FW	GER	Noah Sarenren Bazee
38	MF	GER	Marius Wörl (on loan from Hannover 96)
39	FW	GER	Manuel Wintzheimer (on loan from 1. FC Nürnberg)
40	GK	GER	Jonah Busse

=== Out on loan ===
Note: Flags indicate national team as defined under FIFA eligibility rules; some limited exceptions apply. Players may hold more than one non-FIFA nationality.

No.	Pos.	Nation	Player
—	FW	GER	Christopher Schepp (at SV Meppen until 30 June 2024)

== Transfers ==
=== In ===
Pos.	Player	Transferred from	Fee	Date	Source
FW	(Germany) Noah Sarenren Bazee	(Germany) FC Augsburg	Undisclosed	31 August 2023	

=== Out ===
Pos.	Player	Transferred from	Fee	Date	Source

== Pre-season and friendlies ==
Win Draw Loss Fixtures

22 July 2023 Friendly	VVV-Venlo (Netherlands)	1–3	(Germany) Arminia Bielefeld	Bielefeld
18:00 UTC+2				Stadium: SchücoArena

28 July 2023 Friendly	Arminia Bielefeld (Germany)	0–1	(Germany) Sportfreunde Lotte	Bielefeld
11:00 UTC+2			Ibrahim 15'	Stadium: Trainingsgelände DSC Arminia

29 July 2023 Friendly	Arminia Bielefeld (Germany)	3–1	(Germany) TSV Steinbach	Bielefeld
14:00 UTC+2	Yıldırım 11'; Shipnoski 55'; Oppie 90+2'		Müller 18'	Stadium: SchücoArena

6 January 2024 Friendly	Union Berlin (Germany)	2–0	(Germany) Arminia Bielefeld	Berlin
15:30 CET (UTC+1)	Aaronson 54'; Haberer 59'			Stadium: Stadion An der Alten Försterei; Attendance: 14,107

12 January 2023 Friendly	Arminia Bielefeld (Germany)	0–3	(Germany) SV Rödinghausen	Bielefeld
12:00 CET (UTC+1)				Stadium: Trainingsgelände DSC Arminia

13 January 2023 Friendly	Arminia Bielefeld (Germany)	2–2	(Germany) Fortuna Düsseldorf	Bielefeld
14:00 CET (UTC+1)				Stadium: Trainingsgelände DSC Arminia

== Competitions ==
=== Overall record ===
Competition	First match	Last match	Starting round	Final position	Record							
Competition	First match	Last match	Starting round	Final position	Pld	W	D	L	GF	GA	GD	Win %
3. Liga	5 August 2023	18 May 2024	Matchday 1		35	10	12	13	46	46	+0	28.57
DFB-Pokal	12 August 2023	31 October 2023	First round	Second Round	2	0	2	0	3	3	+0	0.00
Westphalian Cup	8 August 2023	25 May 2024	First round		5	4	1	0	14	2	+12	80.00
Total					42	14	15	13	63	51	+12	33.33

Last updated: 26 April 2024
Source: Soccerway

=== 3. Liga ===
==== League table ====
Pos	Team	Pld	W	D	L	GF	GA	GD	Pts
12	SC Verl	38	14	11	13	59	56	+3	53
13	Viktoria Köln	38	13	10	15	59	65	−6	49
14	Arminia Bielefeld	38	11	13	14	48	47	+1	46
15	1860 Munich	38	13	7	18	40	42	−2	46
16	Waldhof Mannheim	38	11	10	17	51	60	−9	43

Source: DFB
Rules for classification: 1) Points; 2) Goal difference; 3) Goals scored; 4) Head-to-head results; 5) Head-to-head away goals scored; 6) Away goals scored; 7) Play-off.

==== Results summary ====
Overall								Home						Away					
Pld	W	D	L	GF	GA	GD	Pts	W	D	L	GF	GA	GD	W	D	L	GF	GA	GD
24	6	7	11	33	39	−6	25	4	4	5	21	20	+1	2	3	6	12	19	−7

Last updated: 3 February 2024.
Source: DFB

==== Results by round ====
Round	1	2	3	4	5	6	7	8	9	10	11	12	13	14	15	16	17	18	19	20	21	22	23	24	25	26	27
Ground	A	H	A	H	A	H	A	H	A	H	H	A	H	A	H	A	H	A	H	H	A	H	A	H	A	H	A
Result	L	W	L	D	D	L	W	L	L	D	W	W	W	L	D	D	D	D	W	L	L	L	L	L			
Position	18	9	14	14	14	18	13	16	18	17	15	14	11	14	15	15	15	15	13	14	14	14	15	15			

Updated to match(es) played on 3 February 2024. Source: DFB
A = Away; H = Home; W = Win; D = Draw; L = Loss

==== Matches ====
The league fixtures were unveiled on 7 July 2023.

5 August 2023 1	Dynamo Dresden	3–1	Arminia Bielefeld	Dresden
16:15 UTC+2	Belkahia 14'; Kutschke 36'; Hauptmann 65'	Report	Biankadi 45'	Stadium: Rudolf-Harbig-Stadion; Referee: Wolfgang Haslberger

19 August 2023 2	Arminia Bielefeld	4–0	Preußen Münster	Bielefeld
14:00 UTC+2	Shipnoski 19', 45'; Boujellab (yellow card) 29'; Yıldırım 53'; Gohlke 60'	Report	Scherder (yellow card) 55'	Stadium: SchücoArena; Attendance: 24,052; Referee: Timo Gerach

22 August 2023 3	SSV Ulm	1–0	Arminia Bielefeld	Ulm
19:00 UTC+2	Reichert (yellow card) 6'; Maier 43', (yellow card) 74'; Higl (yellow card) 72'	Report	Shipnoski (yellow card) 26'; Belkahia (yellow card) 81'; Koch (yellow card) 82' (yellow-red card) 90+2'	Stadium: SchücoArena; Attendance: 9,977; Referee: Patrick Alt

27 August 2023 4	Arminia Bielefeld	1–1	Jahn Regensburg	Bielefeld
13:30 UTC+2	Gohlke 20'	Report	Ballas 12'	Stadium: SchücoArena; Attendance: 20,000; Referee: Lars Erbst

3 September 2023 5	Viktoria Köln	1–1	Arminia Bielefeld	Cologne
19:30 UTC+2	Koronkiewicz 58'	Report	Sarenren Bazee 84'	Stadium: Sportpark Höhenberg; Attendance: 6,043; Referee: Patrick Ittrich

16 September 2023 6	Arminia Bielefeld	0–2	SC Freiburg II	Bielefeld
14:00 UTC+2		Report	Bichsel 10'; Johansson 61'	Stadium: SchücoArena; Attendance: 18,175; Referee: Assad Nouhoum

22 September 2023 7	SpVgg Unterhaching	1–2	Arminia Bielefeld	Unterhaching
19:00 UTC+2	Stiefler 67'	Report	Mizuta 28'; Putaro 89'	Stadium: Sportpark Unterhaching; Attendance: 3,500; Referee: Tom Bauer

29 September 2023 8	Arminia Bielefeld	2–6	1. FC Saarbrücken	Bielefeld
19:00 UTC+2	Klos 41'; Yıldırım 81'	Report	Neudecker 43'; Kerber 51'; Brünker 68'; Gaus 80'; Stehle 89'; Boeder 90+3'	Stadium: SchücoArena; Attendance: 17,215; Referee: Michael Bacher

3 October 2023 9	SC Verl	3–1	Arminia Bielefeld	Verl
19:00 UTC+2	Batista Meier 6'; Ochojski 42'; Otto 80'	Report	Klos 63'	Stadium: Sportclub Arena; Attendance: 5,207; Referee: Lukas Benen

7 October 2023 10	Arminia Bielefeld	2–2	Borussia Dortmund II	Bielefeld
14:00 UTC+2	Wörl 27'; Klos 69'	Report	Elongo-Yombo 45', 54'	Stadium: SchücoArena; Attendance: 15,837; Referee: Daniel Bartnitzki

14 October 2023 11	Arminia Bielefeld	3–1	Waldhof Mannheim	Bielefeld
16:30 UTC+2	Boujellab 51'; Oppie 57'; Wintzheimer 76'	Report	Arase 20'	Stadium: SchücoArena; Attendance: 16,061; Referee: Florian Lechner

21 October 2023 12	MSV Duisburg	0–1	Arminia Bielefeld	Duisburg
16:30 UTC+2		Report	Klos 39'	Stadium: Schauinsland-Reisen-Arena; Attendance: 14,446; Referee: Patrick Alt

28 October 2023 13	Arminia Bielefeld	4–0	FC Ingolstadt	Bielefeld
14:00 UTC+2	Oppie 12'; Klos 24'; Biankadi 55'; Mizuta 68'	Report		Stadium: SchücoArena; Attendance: 14,717; Referee: Eric Weisbach

4 November 2023 14	Rot-Weiss Essen	2–1	Arminia Bielefeld	Essen
14:00 UTC+1	Obuz 22'; Berlinski 90+1'	Report	Oppie 86'	Stadium: Stadion an der Hafenstraße; Attendance: 19,200; Referee: Felix Bickel

11 November 2023 15	Arminia Bielefeld	1–1	SV Sandhausen	Bielefeld
14:00 UTC+1	Klos 13'	Report	Hennings 54'	Stadium: SchücoArena; Attendance: 16,136; Referee: Patrick Schwengers

26 November 2023 16	Lübeck	2–2	Arminia Bielefeld	Lübeck
13:30 CET	Thiel (yellow card) 37'; Facklam 63' 90+6'; Robin Velasco (yellow card) 67'	Report	Großer (yellow card) 6'; Biankadi 56'; Schneider 62'; Kersken (yellow card) 84'	Stadium: Stadion Lohmühle; Attendance: 8,293; Referee: (Germany) Martin Speckner

2 December 2023 17	Arminia Bielefeld	2–2	Erzgebirge Aue	Bielefeld
14:00 CET	Shipnoski 45+1'; Schreck (yellow card) 53'; Mizuta 75'; Boujellab (yellow card) 76'	Report	Danhof 18'; Bär 40'; Stefaniak (yellow card) 48'; Pepić (yellow card) 69'	Stadium: SchücoArena; Attendance: 15,005; Referee: (Germany) Florian Lechner

8 December 2023 18	Hallescher FC	2–2	Arminia Bielefeld	Halle
19:00 CET	Tunay Deniz 18' 74'; Casar (yellow card) 21'; Halimi (yellow card) 30'; Hug (yellow card) 43'; Julian Eitschberger (yellow card) 50'; Sebastian Zieleniecki (yellow card) 77'; Marco Wolf (yellow card) 88'; Berko (yellow card) 90+2'	Report	Boujellab (yellow card) 2'; Mizuta 12'; Lannert (yellow card) 25'; Wörl (yellow card) 44'; Klos (yellow card) 71' (goal) 87'	Stadium: Leuna Chemie Stadion; Attendance: 6,666; Referee: (Germany) Michael Bacher

17 December 2023 19	Arminia Bielefeld	2–0	1860 Munich	Bielefeld
16:30 CET	Biankadi 12'; Klos 24'; Großer (red card) 64'; Schreck (yellow card) 79'	Report	Starke (yellow card) 59'; Rieder (yellow card) 78'	Stadium: SchücoArena; Attendance: 17,685; Referee: (Germany) Daniel Schlager

20 December 2023 20	Arminia Bielefeld	0–1	Dynamo Dresden	Bielefeld
19:00 CET	Belkahia (yellow card) 27'; Biankadi (yellow card) 32'; Tom Geerkens (yellow card) 89'	Report	Zimmerschied (yellow card) 10'; Lemmer (yellow card) 63'; Hauptmann 78'; Cueto (yellow card) 84'; Lewald (yellow card) 89'	Stadium: SchücoArena; Attendance: 22,041; Referee: (Germany) Patrick Kessel

21 January 2024 21	Preußen Münster	2–1	Arminia Bielefeld	Münster
13:30 CET	Kyerewaa 42' (yellow card) 81'; Mrowca (yellow card) 48'; Grodowski 67'; Yassine Bouchama (yellow card) 90+2'	Report	Momuluh (yellow card) 18'; Biankadi 36' (pen.); Özkan (yellow card) 59'; Corboz (yellow card) 90+4'	Stadium: Preußenstadion; Attendance: 11,744; Referee: (Germany) Lars Erbst

24 January 2024 22	Arminia Bielefeld	0–2	Ulm	Bielefeld
19:00 CET	Lannert (yellow card) 26'; Momuluh (yellow card) 55'; Wintzheimer (yellow card) 90+2'; Gohlke (yellow card) 90+8'	Report	Gaal 10'; Strompf (yellow card) 50'; Higl (yellow card) 59'; Moritz Hannemann 90+4'; Philipp Maier (yellow card) 90+7'	Stadium: SchücoArena; Attendance: 13,710; Referee: (Germany) Alexander Sather

27 January 2024 23	Jahn Regensburg	2–0	Arminia Bielefeld	Regensburg
14:00 CET	Viet 2' 23'; Schönfelder (yellow card) 18'; Noah Ganaus (yellow card) 20' (yellow-red card) 74'	Report	Wörl (yellow card) 45+1'; Gohlke (yellow card) 63'; Yıldırım (yellow card) 79'	Stadium: Jahnstadion Regensburg; Attendance: 9,000; Referee: (Germany) Timo Gansloweit

3 February 2024 24	Arminia Bielefeld	0–2	Viktoria Köln	Bielefeld
16:30 CET	Schneider (yellow card) 76'; Biankadi (yellow card) 87'	Report	Russo (yellow card) 34'; Schultz 45'; Becker (yellow card) 75'; Sidny Lopes Cabral (yellow card) 77'; Philipp 79'	Stadium: SchücoArena; Attendance: 15,629; Referee: (Germany) Richard Hempel

10 February 2024 25	Freiburg II	–	Arminia Bielefeld	Freiburg im Breisgau
16:30 CET				Stadium: Dreisamstadion

=== DFB-Pokal ===
12 August 2023 First round	Arminia Bielefeld	2–2 (a.e.t.) (4–1 p)	VfL Bochum	Bielefeld
18:00 UTC+2	Shipnoski 25'; Biankadi 29'; Yildirim (yellow card) 33'; Belkahia (yellow card) 56'; Schreck (yellow card) 90+4'; Kersken (yellow card) 115'; Boujellab (yellow card) 120+1'	Report	Asano 45+2'; Mašović (yellow card) 82'; Zoller 90+1' (yellow card) 115'; Bero (yellow card) 108'	Stadium: Schüco-Arena; Attendance: 21,452; Referee: Sven Jablonski
	Penalties
	Klos (penalty scored); Gohlke (penalty scored); Wintzheimer (penalty scored); Mizuta (penalty scored)		(penalty missed) Hofmann; (penalty missed) Stöger; (penalty scored) Mašović

31 October 2023 Second round	Arminia Bielefeld	1–1 (a.e.t.) (3–4 p)	Hamburger SV	Bielefeld
20:45 UTC+1	Shipnoski 11'	Report	Jatta 77'	Stadium: Schüco-Arena; Attendance: 26,500; Referee: Robert Kampka
	Penalties
	Klos (penalty missed); Gohlke (penalty scored); Mizuta (penalty scored); Großer (penalty scored); Wörl (penalty missed)		(penalty scored) Bénes; (penalty scored) Muheim; (penalty scored) Glatzel; (penalty missed) Krahn; (penalty scored) Heyer

=== Westphalian Cup ===
8 August 2023 First round	SG FA Herringhausen/Eickum	0–2	Arminia Bielefeld	Herford
18:30 UTC+2			Wintzheimer 16' (pen.); Koch 79'	Stadium: Friedrich-Ludwig-Jahn-Stadion; Attendance: 3,000; Referee: Kevin Oschinski

6 September 2023 Second round	Victoria Clarholz	1–2	Arminia Bielefeld	Gütersloh
19:00 UTC+2	Cylkowski 45' (pen.)		Sarenren Bazee 12'; Boujellab 50'	Stadium: Heidewaldstadion; Attendance: 4,791; Referee: Oliver Visse

10 October 2023 Third round	SuS Westenholz	0–5	Arminia Bielefeld	Verl
19:00 UTC+2			Wintzheimer 13'; Putaro 37' (pen.), 60'; Shipnoski 61'; Geerkens 68'	Stadium: Sportclub Arena; Attendance: 3,020; Referee: Henry Schröder

15 November 2023 Quarterfinal	Arminia Bielefeld	4–0	SV Rödinghausen	Bielefeld
19:00 UTC+1		Report		Stadium: SchücoArena

17 April 2024 Semi-finals	Arminia Bielefeld	–	Preußen Münster	Bielefeld
				Stadium: SchücoArena
