= 2024–25 Arminia Bielefeld season =

Arminia Bielefeld
2024–25 season
- Manager: Michél Kniat
- Stadium: Bielefelder Alm
- 3. Liga: 1st (promoted)
- DFB-Pokal: Runners-up
- Westphalian Cup: Winners
- Top goalscorer: League: Julian Kania (14); All: Julian Kania (17)
- Average home league attendance: 21,279

The 2024–25 season was the 120th season in the history of Arminia Bielefeld, and the club's second consecutive season in 3. Liga. In addition to the domestic league, the team participated in the DFB-Pokal and Westphalian Cup.

Arminia had a successful season, winning the 3. Liga to gain promotion to the 2. Bundesliga for the 2025–26 season. They also reached the final of the DFB-Pokal for the first time in club history and won the Westphalian Cup.

== Friendlies ==
=== Pre-season ===
29 June 2024 Friendly	Arminia Bielefeld (Germany)	3–1	(Germany) ASC 09 Dortmund	Bielefeld
15:30		Report		Stadium: Trainingszentrum an der Friedrich-Hagemann-Straße; Attendance: 400

6 July 2024 Friendly	Arminia Bielefeld (Germany)	4–0	(Germany) 1. FC Bocholt	Bielefeld
14:00				Stadium: Edimedien-Arena

10 July 2024 Friendly	TSV Victoria Clarholz (Germany)	0–1	(Germany) Arminia Bielefeld	Herzebrock
18:30				Stadium: Holzhofstadion

20 July 2024 Friendly	Spezia (Italy)	1–1	(Germany) Arminia Bielefeld	Santa Cristina Gherdëina, Italy
17:00	Soleri 26'		Lukas 75'	Stadium: Centro Sportivo Mulin da Coi

27 July 2024 Friendly	Arminia Bielefeld (Germany)	1–0	(Netherlands) FC Emmen	Bielefeld
14:00				Stadium: Trainingsgelände DSC Arminia

== Competitions ==
=== Overall record ===
Competition	First match	Last match	Starting round	Final position	Record							
Competition	First match	Last match	Starting round	Final position	Pld	W	D	L	GF	GA	GD	Win %
3. Liga	4 August 2024	17 May 2025	Matchday 1	1st (promoted)	38	21	9	8	64	36	+28	55.26
DFB-Pokal	17 August 2024	24 May 2025	First round	Runners-up	6	5	0	1	13	7	+6	83.33
Westphalian Cup	6 August 2024	29 May 2025	First round	Final	5	4	1	0	12	3	+9	80.00
Total					49	30	10	9	89	46	+43	61.22

Source: Soccerway

=== 3. Liga ===
==== League table ====
Pos	Team	Pld	W	D	L	GF	GA	GD	Pts	Promotion, qualification or relegation
1	Arminia Bielefeld (C, P)	38	21	9	8	64	36	+28	72	Promotion to 2. Bundesliga and qualification for DFB-Pokal
2	Dynamo Dresden (P)	38	20	10	8	71	40	+31	70	Promotion to 2. Bundesliga and qualification for DFB-Pokal
3	1. FC Saarbrücken	38	18	11	9	59	47	+12	65	Qualification for promotion play-offs and DFB-Pokal
4	Energie Cottbus	38	18	8	12	64	54	+10	62	Qualification for DFB-Pokal
5	Hansa Rostock	38	18	6	14	54	46	+8	60	

Source: DFB
Rules for classification: 1) Points; 2) Goal difference; 3) Goals scored; 4) Head-to-head results; 5) Head-to-head away goals scored; 6) Away goals scored; 7) Play-off.
(C) Champions; (P) Promoted

==== Matches ====
The match schedule was released on 9 July 2024.

4 August 2024 1	Energie Cottbus	1–2	Arminia Bielefeld	Cottbus
16:30	Halbauer 42'	Report	Oppie 68'; Großer 90+3'	Stadium: Stadion der Freundschaft; Attendance: 12,596; Referee: Tom Bauer

10 August 2024 2	Arminia Bielefeld	1–0	Borussia Dortmund II	Bielefeld
16:30	Mizuta 88'	Report		Stadium: Bielefelder Alm; Attendance: 19,914; Referee: Cristian Ballweg

24 August 2024 3	Rot-Weiss Essen	0–0	Arminia Bielefeld	Essen
14:00		Report		Stadium: Stadion an der Hafenstraße; Attendance: 18,507; Referee: Tobias Reichel

31 August 2024 4	Arminia Bielefeld	1–1	SV Sandhausen	Bielefeld
14:00	Young 90+4'	Report	Lorch 76'	Stadium: Bielefelder Alm; Attendance: 16,622; Referee: Lars Erbst

15 September 2024 5	Erzgebirge Aue	1–3	Arminia Bielefeld	Aue
13:30	Stefaniak 27' (pen.)	Report	Russo 55'; Corboz 61'; Wörl 78'	Stadium: Erzgebirgsstadion; Attendance: 10,111; Referee: Florian Heft

21 September 2024 6	Arminia Bielefeld	0–1	1860 Munich	Bielefeld
16:30		Report	Jacobsen 88'	Stadium: Bielefelder Alm; Attendance: 24,865; Referee: Nico Fuchs

24 September 2024 7	VfB Stuttgart II	3–0	Arminia Bielefeld	Aspach
19:00	Faghir 13'; Boakye 31'; Malanga 68'	Report		Stadium: WIRmachenDRUCK Arena; Attendance: 1,675; Referee: Timon Schulz

29 September 2024 8	Arminia Bielefeld	2–1	SC Verl	Bielefeld
19:30	Kania 45'; Felix 90+2'	Report	Arweiler 7'	Stadium: Bielefelder Alm; Attendance: 18,705; Referee: Felix Weller

6 October 2024 9	1. FC Saarbrücken	0–0	Arminia Bielefeld	Saarbrücken
16:30		Report		Stadium: Ludwigsparkstadion; Attendance: 11,931; Referee: Jarno Wienefeld

20 October 2024 10	Arminia Bielefeld	3–1	VfL Osnabrück	Bielefeld
16:30	Simakala 78'	Report	Sarenren-Bazee 52' Oppie 81' Schroers 85'	Stadium: Bielefelder Alm; Attendance: 25,752; Referee: Tom Bauer

23 October 2024 11	Hannover 96 II	1–4	Arminia Bielefeld	Hannover
19:00	Meier 64'	Report	Kania 4' 42' 82'; Biankadi 88'	Stadium: Heinz von Heiden Arena; Attendance: 8,200; Referee: Assad Nouhoum

26 October 2024 12	Arminia Bielefeld	1–1	Alemannia Aachen	Bielefeld
14:00	Bördner 3' (og)	Report	Lukas Scepanik 53'	Stadium: Bielefelder Alm; Attendance: 21,796; Referee: Richard Hempel

3 November 2024 12	SV Wehen Wiesbaden	0–0	Arminia Bielefeld	Wiesbaden
16:30		Report		Stadium: BRITA-Arena; Attendance: 5,134; Referee: Dr. Robin Braun

9 November 2024 14	Arminia Bielefeld	2–0	FC Viktoria Köln	Bielefeld
16:30	Young 18' Kania 75'	Report		Stadium: Bielefelder Alm; Attendance: 19,692; Referee: Cristian Ballweg

23 November 2024 15	Hansa Rostock	2–1	Arminia Bielefeld	Rostock
14:00	Schuster 10' Ruschke 49'	Report	Kania 86'	Stadium: Ostseestadion; Attendance: 24,500; Referee: Nicolas Winter

29 November 2024 16	Arminia Bielefeld	1–0	FC Ingolstadt 04	Bielefeld
19:00	Oppie 76'	Report		Stadium: Bielefelder Alm; Attendance: 18,750; Referee: Felix Bickel

8 December 2024 17	Dynamo Dresden	3–0	Arminia Bielefeld	Dresden
16:30 CET	Jonas Oehmichen 19'; David Kubatta (yellow card) 31'; Daferner 41'; Meißner 64'; Casar (yellow card) 77'; Risch (yellow card) 86'	Report	Young (yellow card) 38'; Mika Schroers (yellow card) 47'	Stadium: Rudolf-Harbig-Stadion; Attendance: 27,668; Referee: (Germany) Florian Lechner

14 December 2024 18	Arminia Bielefeld	3–3	Unterhaching	Bielefeld
14:00 CET	Wörl 34'; Corboz 78'; Biankadi 90+2'	Report	Stiefler (yellow card) 19' (yellow-red card) 71' (goal) 32'; Tim Hoops (yellow card) 45+1'; Julian Kügel 65'; Geis (yellow card) 74' (goal) 84'	Stadium: Bielefelder Alm; Attendance: 18,553; Referee: (Germany) Konrad Oldhafer

22 December 2024 19	Waldhof Mannheim	1–1	Arminia Bielefeld	Mannheim
13:30 CET	Matriciani (yellow card) 8'; Thalhammer (yellow card) 51'; Seegert (yellow card) 58'; Arase 60'	Report	Louis Oppie (yellow card) 53'; Daniel Gabriel Nsumbu 79'; Felix (yellow card) 90+3'	Stadium: Carl-Benz-Stadion; Attendance: 13,337; Referee: (Germany) Martin Petersen

18 January 2025 20	Arminia Bielefeld	0–2	Energie Cottbus	Bielefeld
14:00 CET	Daniel Gabriel Nsumbu (yellow card) 30'	Report	Copado 2'; Phil Halbauer (yellow card) 43'; Krauß 47'; Rorig (yellow card) 78'	Stadium: Bielefelder Alm; Attendance: 22,000; Referee: (Germany) Lukas Benen

26 January 2025 21	Borussia Dortmund II	0–4	Arminia Bielefeld	Dortmund
19:30 CET	Franz Roggow (yellow card) 12'; Campbell (yellow card) 68'; Krewsun (yellow card) 71'	Report	Franz Roggow 33' (o.g.); Young 47'; Louis Oppie (yellow card) 60'; Uldriķis (yellow card) 61'; Wörl 74' 84'	Stadium: Stadion Rote Erde; Attendance: 8,103; Referee: (Germany) Daniel Bartnitzki

=== DFB-Pokal ===
17 August 2024 First round	Arminia Bielefeld	2–0	Hannover 96	Bielefeld
18:00	Becker 14'; Oppie 21'	Report		Stadium: Schüco-Arena; Attendance: 26,044; Referee: Robert Hartmann

30 October 2024 Second round	Arminia Bielefeld	2–0	Union Berlin	Bielefeld
20:45	Wörl 12'; Becker 71'	Report		Stadium: Schüco-Arena; Attendance: 26,117; Referee: Wolfgang Haslberger

3 December 2024 Round of 16	Arminia Bielefeld	3–1	SC Freiburg	Bielefeld
18:00	Lannert 28'; Kania 36' (pen.); Oppie 81'	Report	Gregoritsch 63'	Stadium: Schüco-Arena; Attendance: 26,311; Referee: Frank Willenborg

25 February 2025 Quarter-finals	Arminia Bielefeld	2–1	Werder Bremen	Bielefeld
20:45	Wörl 35'; Malatini 41' (o.g.)	Report	Burke 56'	Stadium: Schüco-Arena; Attendance: 26,601; Referee: Robert Hartmann

1 April 2025 Semi-finals	Arminia Bielefeld	2–1	Bayer Leverkusen	Bielefeld
20:45	Wörl 20'; Großer 45+3'	Report	Tah 17'	Stadium: Schüco-Arena; Attendance: 26,601; Referee: Harm Osmers

24 May 2025 Final	Arminia Bielefeld	2–4	VfB Stuttgart	Berlin
20:00	Kania 82'; Vagnoman 85' (o.g.)	Report	Woltemade 15'; Millot 22', 66'; Undav 28'	Stadium: Olympiastadion; Attendance: 74,036; Referee: Christian Dingert (Lebecksmühle)

=== Westphalian Cup ===
6 August 2024 First round	TuS Lipperreihe	2–2 (5–6 p)	Arminia Bielefeld	Oerlinghausen
18:30	Schulz 53'; Heidemann 81'	Report	Boujellab 2', 21'	Stadium: Stadtwerke ARENA Lipperreihe; Attendance: 2,500; Referee: Janik Stork
	Penalties
	Danne (penalty scored); Küçük (penalty scored); Heidemann (penalty scored); Schulz (penalty scored); Friedrich (penalty scored)		Kunze (penalty scored); Geerkens (penalty scored); Wörl (penalty scored); Lippert (penalty scored); Corboz (penalty scored); Mizuta (penalty scored)

7 September 2024 Second round	SC Peckeloh	0–1	Arminia Bielefeld	Versmold
15:00		Report	Kania 90+3'	Stadium: Kurt-Nagel-Parkstadion; Attendance: 3,000; Referee: Yannick Rupert

9 October 2024 Round of 16	Arminia Bielefeld	3–1	SV Westfalia Soest	Bielefeld
19:30	Becker 5', 20', 80'	Report	Greco 68'	Stadium: Bielefelder Alm; Attendance: 2,900; Referee: Florian Visse

16 November 2024 Quarter-finals	SC Westfalia Herne	0–5	Arminia Bielefeld	Herne
			Corboz 10', 61'; Russo 54'; Biankadi 76'; Sumbu 87'	Stadium: Mondpalast-Arena; Attendance: 2,200

19 March 2025 Semi-finals	Sportfreunde Siegen	0–1	Arminia Bielefeld	Siegen
			Biankadi 85'	Stadium: Leimbachstadion; Attendance: 7,838

29 May 2025 Final	Arminia Bielefeld	2–0	Sportfreunde Lotte	Bielefeld
	Grodowski 16'; Sarenren Bazee 90'			Stadium: Bielefelder Alm
