= 2025 DFB-Pokal final =

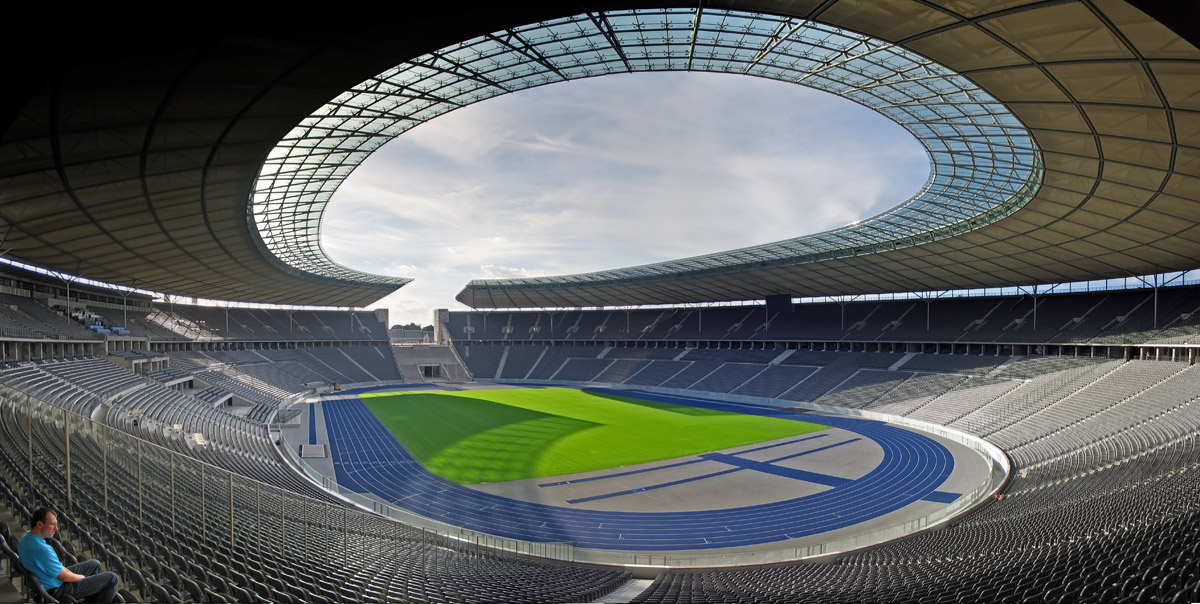
- The Olympiastadion in Berlin hosted the final.
- Event: 2024–25 DFB-Pokal
Arminia Bielefeld	VfB Stuttgart
2	4
- Date: 24 May 2025
- Venue: Olympiastadion, Berlin
- Man of the Match: Angelo Stiller (VfB Stuttgart)
- Referee: Christian Dingert (Lebecksmühle)
- Attendance: 74,036

The 2025 DFB-Pokal final decided the winner of the 2024–25 DFB-Pokal, the 82nd season of the annual German football cup competition. The match was played on 24 May 2025 at the Olympiastadion in Berlin.

The match featured Arminia Bielefeld, a 3. Liga side, and VfB Stuttgart, a Bundesliga side. Arminia Bielefeld, in their first final, became the fourth third-division side to reach the DFB-Pokal final.

VfB Stuttgart won the match 4–2 for their fourth DFB-Pokal title. As winners, they hosted the 2025 Franz Beckenbauer Supercup at the start of the following season, and faced the winners of the 2024–25 Bundesliga, Bayern Munich. They also earned automatic qualification for the league phase of the 2025–26 UEFA Europa League.

== Teams ==
In the following table, finals until 1943 were in the Tschammerpokal era, since 1953 were in the DFB-Pokal era.

Team	Previous final appearances (bold indicates winners)
Arminia Bielefeld	None
VfB Stuttgart	6 (**1954**, **1958**, 1986, **1997**, 2007, 2013)

Arminia Bielefeld reached their first German Cup final, becoming the first team from the 3. Liga to do so. They are the fourth team from the third division to reach the DFB-Pokal final, following Hertha BSC Amateure in 1993, Energie Cottbus in 1997 and Union Berlin in 2001—each of whom lost.

== Route to the final ==
The DFB-Pokal began with 64 teams in a single-elimination knockout cup competition. There were a total of five rounds leading up to the final. Teams were drawn against each other, and the winner after 90 minutes advanced. If still tied, 30 minutes of extra time were played. If the score was still level, a penalty shoot-out was used to determine the winner.

Note: In all results below, the score of the finalist is given first (H: home; A: away).

Arminia Bielefeld		Round	VfB Stuttgart	
Opponent	Result	2024–25 DFB-Pokal	Opponent	Result
Hannover 96	2–0 (H)	First round	Preußen Münster	5–0 (A)
Union Berlin	2–0 (H)	Second round	1. FC Kaiserslautern	2–1 (H)
SC Freiburg	3–1 (H)	Round of 16	Jahn Regensburg	3–0 (A)
Werder Bremen	2–1 (H)	Quarter-finals	FC Augsburg	1–0 (H)
Bayer Leverkusen	2–1 (H)	Semi-finals	RB Leipzig	3–1 (H)

== Match ==
=== Details ===
24 May 2025
20:00 CEST

Arminia Bielefeld	2–4	VfB Stuttgart
Kania 82'; Vagnoman 85' (o.g.)	Report	Woltemade 15'; Millot 22', 66'; Undav 28'

Olympiastadion, Berlin
Attendance: 74,036
Referee: Christian Dingert (Lebecksmühle)

**Arminia Bielefeld**	**VfB Stuttgart**

GK	1	(Germany) Jonas Kersken
RB	2	(Germany) Felix Hagmann		(substituted off) 46'
CB	19	(Germany) Maximilian Großer
CB	23	(Germany) Leon Schneider	(yellow card) 53'
LB	4	(Germany) Louis Oppie
DM	21	(Germany) Stefano Russo
CM	6	(United States) Mael Corboz (c)
CM	8	(Germany) Sam Schreck		(substituted off) 46'
RW	37	(Germany) Noah Sarenren Bazee	(yellow card) 25'	(substituted off) 59'
LW	38	(Germany) Marius Wörl		(substituted off) 83'
CF	11	(Germany) Joel Grodowski		(substituted off) 80'
Substitutes:
GK	18	(Germany) Leo Oppermann
DF	3	(Denmark) Joel Felix	(yellow card) 90'	(substituted on) 59'
DF	24	(Germany) Christopher Lannert		(substituted on) 46'
MF	10	(Morocco) Nassim Boujellab
MF	13	(Germany) Lukas Kunze		(substituted on) 83'
MF	17	(Germany) Merveille Biankadi
FW	7	(Germany) Julian Kania		(substituted on) 80'
FW	22	(Germany) Mika Schroers
FW	30	(United States) Isaiah Young		(substituted on) 46'
Manager:
(Germany) Michél Kniat			(yellow card) 53'

GK	33	(Germany) Alexander Nübel
RB	4	(Germany) Josha Vagnoman	(yellow card) 27'
CB	14	(Switzerland) Luca Jaquez
CB	24	(Germany) Jeff Chabot		(substituted off) 76'
LB	7	(Germany) Maximilian Mittelstädt
CM	16	(Turkey) Atakan Karazor (c)
CM	6	(Germany) Angelo Stiller		(substituted off) 87'
RW	8	(France) Enzo Millot	(yellow card) 67'	(substituted off) 69'
AM	26	(Germany) Deniz Undav
LW	27	(Germany) Chris Führich		(substituted off) 69'
CF	11	(Germany) Nick Woltemade
Substitutes:
GK	1	(Germany) Fabian Bredlow
DF	3	(Netherlands) Ramon Hendriks		(substituted on) 69'
DF	15	(Germany) Pascal Stenzel
DF	29	(Germany) Finn Jeltsch		(substituted on) 76'
MF	5	(Germany) Yannik Keitel
MF	28	(Denmark) Nikolas Nartey		(substituted on) 87'
FW	9	(Bosnia and Herzegovina) Ermedin Demirović		(substituted on) 69'
FW	18	(Germany) Jamie Leweling
FW	25	(Denmark) Jacob Bruun Larsen
Manager:
(Germany) Sebastian Hoeneß

Man of the Match:
Angelo Stiller (VfB Stuttgart)

Assistant referees:
Benedikt Kempkes (Thür)
Nikolai Kimmeyer (Karlsruhe)
Fourth official:
Robert Hartmann (Wangen im Allgäu)
Reserve assistant referee:
Sascha Thielert (Buchholz in der Nordheide)
Video assistant referee:
Benjamin Brand (Unterspiesheim)
Assistant video assistant referee:
Felix-Benjamin Schwermer (Leipzig)

**Match rules**

- 90 minutes
- 30 minutes of extra time if necessary
- Penalty shoot-out if scores still level
- Maximum of nine named substitutes
- Maximum of five substitutions
- Maximum of three substitution opportunities

== See also ==
- 2025 Franz Beckenbauer Supercup
- Football in Berlin
