= 2022–23 SV Waldhof Mannheim season =

SV Waldhof Mannheim
2022–23 season
- Chairman: Bernd Beetz
- Manager: Christian Neidhart
- Stadium: Carl-Benz-Stadion
- 3. Liga: 7th
- DFB-Pokal: Second round

The 2022–23 SV Waldhof Mannheim season was the 116th edition of the football and their fourth consecutive season in the third division since 2021. The club contested in 3. Liga and DFB-Pokal.

== Players ==
As of 16 July 2022

Note: Flags indicate national team as defined under FIFA eligibility rules; some limited exceptions apply. Players may hold more than one non-FIFA nationality.

No.	Pos.	Nation	Player
2	DF	GER	Niklas Sommer
3	DF	GER	Julian Riedel
4	MF	POL	Adrian Malachowski
5	DF	GER	Marcel Seegert (captain)
6	MF	GER	Stefano Russo
7	MF	GER	Dominik Kother (on loan from Karlsruher SC)
8	MF	GER	Fridolin Wagner
9	MF	GER	Bentley Baxter Bahn
10	FW	GER	Pascal Sohm
11	FW	CRO	Dominik Martinović
12	GK	GER	Morten Behrens (on loan from Darmstadt)

No.	Pos.	Nation	Player
13	MF	GER	Marc Schnatterer
16	DF	GER	Johannes Dörfler (on loan from Paderborn)
17	FW	AZE	Baris Ekincier
20	MF	FRA	Adrien Lebeau
21	DF	GER	Alexander Rossipal
23	GK	GER	Jan-Christoph Bartels
27	DF	GER	Gerrit Gohlke
30	GK	GER	Lucien Hawryluk
33	MF	GER	Berkan Taz
37	MF	GER	Marco Höger

== Pre-season and friendlies ==
Win Draw Loss Fixtures

25 June 2022 Friendly	Kurpfalz (Germany)	0–4	(Germany) Waldhof Mannheim	Mannheim
15:00 CEST (UTC+2)				Stadium: Waldwegstadion

29 June 2022 Friendly	Waldhof Mannheim (Germany)	2–0	(Switzerland) Aarau	Forst
18:00 CEST (UTC+2)				Stadium: Waldseestadion

2 July 2022 Friendly	Arminia Ludwigshafen (Germany)	1–5	(Germany) Waldhof Mannheim	Ludwigshafen am Rhein
14:00 CEST (UTC+2)				Stadium: Südweststadion

9 July 2022 Friendly	Waldhof Mannheim (Germany)	0–1	(Germany) SV Elversberg	Mannheim
14:00 CEST (UTC+2)				Stadium: Seppl-Herberger-Stadion

== Competitions ==
=== Overall record ===
Competition	First match	Last match	Starting round	Final position	Record							
Competition	First match	Last match	Starting round	Final position	Pld	W	D	L	GF	GA	GD	Win %
3. Liga	23 July 2022	27 May 2023	Matchday 1	7th	38	19	3	16	63	65	−2	50.00
DFB-Pokal	31 July 2022	18 October 2022	First round	Second round	2	0	1	1	0	1	−1	0.00
Total					40	19	4	17	63	66	−3	47.50

Source: Competitions

=== 3. Liga ===
==== League table ====
Pos	Team	Pld	W	D	L	GF	GA	GD	Pts	Promotion, qualification or relegation
5	1. FC Saarbrücken	38	20	9	9	64	39	+25	69	Qualification for DFB-Pokal
6	Dynamo Dresden	38	20	9	9	65	44	+21	69	
7	Waldhof Mannheim	38	19	3	16	63	65	−2	60	
8	1860 Munich	38	16	9	13	61	52	+9	57	
9	Viktoria Köln	38	14	13	11	58	53	+5	55	

Source: DFB
Rules for classification: 1) Points; 2) Goal difference; 3) Goals scored; 4) Head-to-head results; 5) Head-to-head away goals scored; 6) Away goals scored; 7) Play-off.

==== Results summary ====
Overall								Home						Away					
Pld	W	D	L	GF	GA	GD	Pts	W	D	L	GF	GA	GD	W	D	L	GF	GA	GD
38	19	3	16	63	65	−2	60	15	1	3	37	21	+16	4	2	13	26	44	−18

Source: DFB

==== Results by round ====
Round	1	2	3	4	5	6	7	8	9	10	11	12	13	14	15	16	17	18	19	20	21	22	23	24	25	26	27	28	29	30	31	32	33	34	35	36	37	38
Ground	H	A	H	A	H	A	H	A	H	A	H	A	H	H	A	H	A	H	A	A	H	A	H	A	H	A	H	A	H	A	H	A	A	H	A	H	A	H
Result	W	D	W	L	W	L	W	L	W	L	W	L	L	W	L	W	D	W	W	W	D	L	W	L	W	W	W	L	L	L	W	W	L	W	L	L	L	W
Position	2																																					

Source: DFB
A = Away; H = Home; W = Win; D = Draw; L = Loss

==== Matches ====
The league fixtures were announced on 24 June 2022.

23 July 2022 1	Waldhof Mannheim	3–1	Viktoria Köln	Mannheim
14:00 CEST (UTC+2)	Ekincier 64'; Gohlke 86'; Kother 90+2'	Report	Amyn 73'	Stadium: Carl-Benz-Stadion; Attendance: 7,868; Referee: Daniel Schlager

7 August 2022 2	SC Verl	2–2	Waldhof Mannheim	Paderborn
15:00 CEST (UTC+2)				Stadium: Home Deluxe Arena

10 August 2022 3	Waldhof Mannheim	1–0	Erzgebirge Aue	Mannheim
19:00 CEST (UTC+2)				Stadium: Carl-Benz-Stadion

14 August 2022 4	SV Meppen	6–2	Waldhof Mannheim	Meppen
CEST (UTC+2)

20 August 2022 5	Waldhof Mannheim	2–1	Borussia Dortmund II	Mannheim
CEST (UTC+2)				Stadium: Carl-Benz-Stadion

27 August 2022 6	SV Elversberg	1–0	Waldhof Mannheim	Spiesen-Elversberg
CEST (UTC+2)

3 September 2022 7	Waldhof Mannheim	2–1	SpVgg Bayreuth	Mannheim
CEST (UTC+2)				Stadium: Carl-Benz-Stadion

10 September 2022 8	FC Ingolstadt	1–0	Waldhof Mannheim	Ingolstadt
CEST (UTC+2)

=== DFB-Pokal ===
31 July 2022 First round	Waldhof Mannheim	0–0 (5–3 p)	Holstein Kiel	Mannheim
18:00 CEST (UTC+2)		Report		Stadium: Carl-Benz-Stadion; Attendance: 13,137; Referee: Tobias Reichel
	Penalties
	Bahn (penalty scored); Rossipal (penalty scored); Russo (penalty scored); Sohm (penalty scored); Wagner (penalty scored)		(penalty scored) Erras; (penalty scored) Komenda; (penalty missed) Schulz; (penalty scored) Okyere Wriedt

18 October 2022 Second round	Waldhof Mannheim	0–1	1. FC Nürnberg	Mannheim
--:-- CEST (UTC+2)				Stadium: Carl-Benz-Stadion
