= Gohlke =

Gohlke is a surname. Notable people with the surname include:

- Frank Gohlke (born 1942), American landscape photographer
- Gerrit Gohlke (born 1999), German football player
- Jack Gohlke (born 1999), American basketball player
- Nicole Gohlke (born 1975), German politician
