= 2024–25 Rot-Weiss Essen season =

Rot-Weiss Essen
2024–25 season
- Head coach: Christoph Dabrowski (until 9 December); Uwe Koschinat (from 12 December)
- Stadium: Stadion an der Hafenstraße
- 3. Liga: 8th
- DFB-Pokal: First round
- Lower Rhine Cup: Winners
- Top goalscorer: League: Ahmet Arslan (14); All: Ahmet Arslan (14)

The 2024–25 season was the 118th season in the history of Rot-Weiss Essen, and the club's third consecutive season in the 3. Liga. The club also took part in the DFB-Pokal and the Lower Rhine Cup.

On 9 December 2024, head coach Christoph Dabrowski was dismissed from his position following a period of poor results.

== Transfers ==
=== In ===
Pos.	Player	Transferred from	Fee	Date	Source
MF	(Belgium) Robbie D'Haese	(Belgium) Oostende	Free	1 July 2024	
MF	(Germany) Ahmet Arslan	(Germany) 1. FC Magdeburg	Undisclosed	28 July 2024	
FW	(Germany) Manuel Wintzheimer	(Germany) 1. FC Nürnberg	Loan	1 August 2024	
DF	(Germany) Julian Eitschberger	(Germany) Hertha BSC	Loan	20 August 2024	
MF	(Germany) Kelsey Meisel	(Germany) Schalke 04	Undisclosed	28 August 2024	
FW	(Germany) Joseph Boyamba	(Germany) SV Elversberg	Free	2 September 2024	
MF	(Albania) Klaus Gjasula	(Germany) Darmstadt 98	Free	6 January 2025	
FW	(Croatia) Dominik Martinović	(Croatia) Slaven Belupo	Free	6 January 2025	
DF	(Germany) Matti Wagner	(Germany) Greuther Fürth	Loan	14 January 2025	
MF	(Japan) Kaito Mizuta	(Germany) Arminia Bielefeld	Free	29 January 2025	

=== Out ===
Pos.	Player	Transferred to	Fee	Date	Source
FW	(Croatia) Leonardo Vonić	(Portugal) FC Porto B	Undisclosed	21 January 2025	
FW	(Albania) Dion Berisha	(Germany) SGV Freiberg	Loan	4 February 2025	
MF	(Belgium) Robbie D'Haese	(Belgium) KV Diksmuide Oostende	Contract terminated	4 February 2025	

== Friendlies ==
=== Pre-season ===
29 June 2024 Friendly	Rot-Weiss Essen (Germany)	5–0	(Germany) SG Essen-Schönebeck
14:00

7 July 2024 Friendly	Schwarz-Weiß Essen (Germany)	1–4	(Germany) Rot-Weiss Essen	Essen
16:00				Stadium: Stadion „Am Hallo"; Attendance: 1,356

14 July 2024 Friendly	Rot-Weiss Essen (Germany)	0–0	(Germany) TSG Hoffenheim II
13:00

26 July 2024 Friendly	Rot-Weiss Essen (Germany)	1–2	(Germany) Bayer Leverkusen
19:00

=== Mid-season ===
5 September 2024 Friendly	VfL Bochum (Germany)	3–1	(Germany) Rot-Weiss Essen
14:00

5 January 2025 Friendly	Rot-Weiss Essen (Germany)	5–2	(Netherlands) FC Emmen
14:00

11 January 2025 Friendly	Dynamo Dresden (Germany)	1–1	(Germany) Rot-Weiss Essen
12:00

== Competitions ==
=== Overall record ===
Competition	First match	Last match	Starting round	Final position	Record							
Competition	First match	Last match	Starting round	Final position	Pld	W	D	L	GF	GA	GD	Win %
3. Liga	3 August 2024	17 May 2025	Matchday 1		36	15	7	14	51	52	−1	41.67
DFB-Pokal	17 August 2024		First round	First round	1	0	0	1	1	4	−3	0.00
Lower Rhine Cup	27 August 2024	24 May 2025	First round		5	5	0	0	13	2	+11	100.00
Total					42	20	7	15	65	58	+7	47.62

Last updated: 3 May 2025
Source: Competitions

=== 3. Liga ===
==== League table ====
Pos	Team	Pld	W	D	L	GF	GA	GD	Pts
6	Viktoria Köln	38	18	5	15	59	48	+11	59
7	SC Verl	38	15	12	11	62	55	+7	57
8	Rot-Weiss Essen	38	16	8	14	55	54	+1	56
9	Wehen Wiesbaden	38	15	10	13	59	60	−1	55
10	FC Ingolstadt	38	14	12	12	72	63	+9	54

Source: DFB
Rules for classification: 1) Points; 2) Goal difference; 3) Goals scored; 4) Head-to-head results; 5) Head-to-head away goals scored; 6) Away goals scored; 7) Play-off.

==== Results summary ====
Overall								Home						Away					
Pld	W	D	L	GF	GA	GD	Pts	W	D	L	GF	GA	GD	W	D	L	GF	GA	GD
36	15	7	14	51	52	−1	52	8	5	5	30	25	+5	7	2	9	21	27	−6

Last updated: 3 May 2025.

==== Results by round ====
Round	1	2	3	4	5	6	7	8	9	10	11	12	13	14	15	16	17	18	19	20	21	22	23	24	25	26	27	28	29	30	31	32	33	34	35	36	37
Ground	H	A	H	A	H	A	H	A	H	A	H	A	H	A	H	A	H	A	H	A	H	A	H	A	H	A	H	A	H	A	H	A	H	A	H	A	H
Result	L	W	D	L	L	D	W	L	W	D	L	L	W	L	D	L	L	L	D	L	W	W	D	W	W	W	W	L	D	L	W	W	W	W	L	W	
Position																																					

Updated to match(es) played on 3 May 2025. Source:
A = Away; H = Home; W = Win; D = Draw; L = Loss

==== Matches ====
3 August 2024 1	Rot-Weiss Essen	1–2	Alemannia Aachen

11 August 2024 2	Hannover 96 II	1–3	Rot-Weiss Essen

24 August 2024 3	Rot-Weiss Essen	0–0	Arminia Bielefeld

1 September 2024 4	Unterhaching	2–0	Rot-Weiss Essen

14 September 2024 5	Rot-Weiss Essen	0–3	Wehen Wiesbaden

21 September 2024 6	Ingolstadt	2–2	Rot-Weiss Essen

25 September 2024 7	Rot-Weiss Essen	3–1	Borussia Dortmund II

28 September 2024 8	Waldhof Mannheim	1–0	Rot-Weiss Essen

5 October 2024 9	Rot-Weiss Essen	2–1	Viktoria Köln

20 October 2024 10	Dynamo Dresden	3–3	Rot-Weiss Essen

23 October 2024 11	Rot-Weiss Essen	1–3	SC Verl

26 October 2024 12	Hansa Rostock	4–0	Rot-Weiss Essen

2 November 2024 13	Rot-Weiss Essen	4–0	Energie Cottbus

10 November 2024 14	Erzgebirge Aue	2–1	Rot-Weiss Essen

23 November 2024 15	Rot-Weiss Essen	1–1	SV Sandhausen

1 December 2024 16	1. FC Saarbrücken	1–0	Rot-Weiss Essen

8 December 2024 17	Rot-Weiss Essen	0–3	1860 Munich

15 December 2024 18	VfL Osnabrück	2–0	Rot-Weiss Essen

21 December 2024 19	Rot-Weiss Essen	2–2	VfB Stuttgart II

19 January 2025 20	Alemannia Aachen	2–0	Rot-Weiss Essen

26 January 2025 21	Rot-Weiss Essen	5–1	Hannover 96 II

2 February 2025 22	Arminia Bielefeld	1–2	Rot-Weiss Essen

8 February 2025 23	Rot-Weiss Essen	1–1	Unterhaching

15 February 2025 24	Wehen Wiesbaden	1–3	Rot-Weiss Essen

22 February 2025 25	Rot-Weiss Essen	2–0	Ingolstadt

1 March 2025 26	Borussia Dortmund II	0–1	Rot-Weiss Essen

9 March 2025 27	Rot-Weiss Essen	1–0	Waldhof Mannheim

12 March 2025 28	Viktoria Köln	1–0	Rot-Weiss Essen

15 March 2025 29	Rot-Weiss Essen	1–1	Dynamo Dresden

28 March 2025 30	SC Verl	3–0	Rot-Weiss Essen

6 April 2025 31	Rot-Weiss Essen	2–1	Hansa Rostock

9 April 2025 32	Energie Cottbus	0–1	Rot-Weiss Essen

12 April 2025 33	Rot-Weiss Essen	4–2	Erzgebirge Aue

19 April 2025 34	SV Sandhausen	0–2	Rot-Weiss Essen

26 April 2025 35	Rot-Weiss Essen	0–3	1. FC Saarbrücken

3 May 2025 36	1860 Munich	1–3	Rot-Weiss Essen

10 May 2025 37	Rot-Weiss Essen	v	VfL Osnabrück
16:30

=== DFB-Pokal ===
17 August 2024 First round	Rot-Weiss Essen	1–4	RB Leipzig	Essen
15:30				Stadium: Stadion an der Hafenstraße; Referee: Christian Dingert

=== Lower Rhine Cup ===
27 August 2024 First round	Rot-Weiss Essen	4–0	Sterkrade	Essen
19:00				Stadium: Stadion an der Hafenstraße

8 September 2024 Second round	Mülheimer	0–2	Rot-Weiss Essen	Mülheim an der Ruhr
15:00				Stadium: RuhrStadion

12 October 2024 Round of 16	Hilden	0–2	Rot-Weiss Essen	Hilden
14:30				Stadium: Bezirkssportanlage Am Bandsbusch

16 November 2024 Quarter-finals	Sonsbeck	1–3	Rot-Weiss Essen	Sonsbeck
13:30				Stadium: Willy-Lemkens-Sportpark

22 March 2025 Semi-finals	Rot-Weiß Oberhausen	1–2	Rot-Weiss Essen	Oberhausen
14:00				Stadium: Niederrheinstadion

24 May 2025 Final	MSV Duisburg	v	Rot-Weiss Essen
