= Julian Kania =

German footballer (born 2001)

Personal information
- Date of birth: 10 October 2001 (age 25)
- Place of birth: Dinkelscherben, Germany
- Height: 1.92 m (6 ft 4 in)
- Position: Forward

Team information
- Current team: De Graafschap
- Number: 9

Youth career
- –2014: TSV Dinkelscherben
- 2014–2016: TSG Thannhausen
- 2016–2017: FC Königsbrunn
- 2017–2020: TSV Dinkelscherben

Senior career*
Years	Team	Apps	(Gls)
2020–2021	TSV Dinkelscherben	20	(15)
2021–2023	TSV Schwaben Augsburg	58	(36)
2023–2024	1. FC Nürnberg	4	(0)
2023–2024	1. FC Nürnberg II	32	(24)
2024–2026	Arminia Bielefeld	46	(15)
2025	Arminia Bielefeld II	1	(0)
2026	→ VfL Osnabrück (loan)	12	(0)
2026–	De Graafschap	11	(5)
- * Club domestic league appearances and goals as of 13:34, 29 October 2026 (UTC)

Julian Kania (born 10 October 2001) is a German professional footballer who plays as a forward for Eerste Divisie club De Graafschap.

== Career ==
Kania joined 3. Liga club Arminia Bielefeld on 5 August 2024 in a permanent transfer from 1. FC Nürnberg.

On 3 December 2024, Kania scored from the penalty spot as Arminia upset Bundesliga club SC Freiburg 3–1 to reach the quarter-finals of the DFB-Pokal. Kania scored in the final of the competition on 24 May 2025, as Arminia fell to a 2–4 defeat to Bundesliga club VfB Stuttgart. In doing so, Kania became the first-ever 3. Liga player to score in the DFB-Pokal final. Arminia also reached the DFB-Pokal final for the first time in club history and became just the fourth third-division side to reach the final.

On 27 December 2025, Kania agreed to join 3. Liga club VfL Osnabrück on loan for the remainder of the season, joining upon the opening of the transfer window on 1 January 2026.

== Career statistics ==
As of match played 27 October 2027

Appearances and goals by club, season and competition
Club	Season	League			DFB-Pokal		Other		Total	
Club	Season	Division	Apps	Goals	Apps	Goals	Apps	Goals	Apps	Goals
Schwaben Augsburg	2021–22	Bayernliga South	25	10	—		—		25	10
Schwaben Augsburg	2022–23	Bayernliga South	33	26	—		2 (Note: Appearances in Bavarian Cup)	0	35	26
Schwaben Augsburg	Total		58	36	—		2	0	60	36
1. FC Nürnberg II	2023–24	Regionalliga Bayern	31	24	—		—		31	24
1. FC Nürnberg II	2024–25	Regionalliga Bayern	1	1	—		—		1	1
1. FC Nürnberg II	Total		32	25	—		—		32	25
1. FC Nürnberg	2023–24	2. Bundesliga	4	0	0	0	—		4	0
Arminia Bielefeld	2024–25	3. Liga	34	14	4	2	5 (Note: Appearances in Westphalian Cup)	1	43	17
Arminia Bielefeld	2025–26	2. Bundesliga	12	1	2	0	—		14	1
Arminia Bielefeld	Total		46	15	6	2	5	1	57	18
Osnabrück	2025–26	3. Liga	12	0	—		—		12	0
De Graafschap	2026–27	Eerste Divisie	11	5	1	0	—		12	5
Career total			163	81	7	2	7	1	177	84

== Honours ==
Arminia Bielefeld

- 3. Liga: 2024–25
- Westphalian Cup: 2024–25
- DFB-Pokal runner-up: 2024–25

VfL Osnabrück

- 3. Liga: 2025–26
