= 2024–25 DFB-Pokal =

Tournament details
- Country: Germany
- Venue(s): Olympiastadion, Berlin
- Dates: 16 August 2024 – 24 May 2025
- Teams: 64

Final positions
- Champions: VfB Stuttgart (4th title)
- Runners-up: Arminia Bielefeld
- Europa League: VfB Stuttgart

Tournament statistics
- Matches played: 63
- Goals scored: 213 (3.38 per match)
- Attendance: 1,598,049 (25,366 per match)
- Top goal scorer: Nick Woltemade (5 goals)
- Goals scored in penalty shoot-outs not included.

The 2024–25 DFB-Pokal was the 82nd season of the annual German football cup competition. Sixty-four teams participated in the competition, including all teams from the previous year's Bundesliga and 2. Bundesliga. The competition began on 16 August 2024 with the first of six rounds and ended on 24 May 2025 with the final at the Olympiastadion in Berlin, a nominally neutral venue, which has hosted the final since 1985. The DFB-Pokal is considered the second-most important club title in German football after the Bundesliga championship. The DFB-Pokal is run by the German Football Association (DFB).

Bayer Leverkusen were the defending champions, but they were eliminated by Arminia Bielefeld in the semi-finals. VfB Stuttgart won a fourth title after defeating Bielefeld 4–2 in the final.

As winners, Stuttgart earned automatic qualification to the 2025–26 UEFA Europa League league phase. They also hosted the 2025 edition of the Franz Beckenbauer Supercup at the start of the next season, and faced the winners of the 2024–25 Bundesliga, Bayern Munich.

== Participating clubs ==
The following teams qualified for the competition:

Bundesliga the 18 clubs of the 2023–24 season	2. Bundesliga; the 18 clubs of the 2023–24 season	3. Liga; the top 4 clubs of the 2023–24 season
FC Augsburg; Union Berlin; VfL Bochum; Werder Bremen; Darmstadt 98; Borussia Dortmund; Eintracht Frankfurt; SC Freiburg; 1. FC Heidenheim; TSG Hoffenheim; 1. FC Köln; RB Leipzig; Bayer Leverkusen; Mainz 05; Borussia Mönchengladbach; Bayern Munich; VfB Stuttgart; VfL Wolfsburg	Eintracht Braunschweig; Hertha BSC; Fortuna Düsseldorf; SV Elversberg; Greuther Fürth; Hamburger SV; Hannover 96; 1. FC Kaiserslautern; Karlsruher SC; Holstein Kiel; 1. FC Magdeburg; 1. FC Nürnberg; VfL Osnabrück; SC Paderborn; Hansa Rostock; Schalke 04; FC St. Pauli; Wehen Wiesbaden	SSV Ulm; Preußen Münster; Jahn Regensburg; Dynamo Dresden
Representatives of the regional associations 24 representatives of 21 regional associations of the DFB, qualified (in general) through the 2023–24 Verbandspokal (Note: The three regions with the most participating teams in their league competitions (Bavaria, Lower Saxony, and Westphalia) were allowed to enter two teams for the competition.)
Baden: SV Sandhausen; Bavaria (Note: In addition to the Bavarian Cup winners, the best-placed amateur team of the Regionalliga Bayern also qualified.): FC Ingolstadt (CW) (Note: FC Ingolstadt qualified regardless of the outcome of the final of the Bavarian Cup, as Würzburger Kickers, the other finalists, already qualified for the DFB-Pokal through their Regionalliga Bayern position.); Würzburger Kickers (RB); Berlin: Viktoria Berlin; Brandenburg: Energie Cottbus; Bremen: Bremer SV; Hamburg: Teutonia Ottensen; Hesse: Kickers Offenbach	Lower Rhine: Rot-Weiss Essen; Lower Saxony (Note: The Lower Saxony Cup was split into two paths: one for 3. Liga and Regionalliga Nord teams, and the other for amateur teams. The winners of each path qualified.): SV Meppen (3L/RL); VfV Hildesheim (Am.); Mecklenburg-Vorpommern: Greifswalder FC; Middle Rhine: Alemannia Aachen; Rhineland: TuS Koblenz; Saarland: 1. FC Saarbrücken; Saxony: Erzgebirge Aue (Note: Erzgebirge Aue qualified regardless of the outcome of the final of the Saxony Cup, as Dynamo Dresden, the other finalists, already qualified for the DFB-Pokal through their 3. Liga position.)	Saxony-Anhalt: Hallescher FC; Schleswig-Holstein: Phönix Lübeck; South Baden: FC 08 Villingen; Southwest: Schott Mainz; Thuringia: Carl Zeiss Jena; Westphalia (Note: In addition to the Westphalian Cup winners, the best-placed amateur team of the Oberliga Westfalen also qualified.): Arminia Bielefeld (CW); Sportfreunde Lotte (OW); Württemberg: VfR Aalen

== Format ==
=== Participation ===
The DFB-Pokal began with a round of 64 teams. The 36 teams of the Bundesliga and 2. Bundesliga, along with the top four finishers of the 3. Liga automatically qualified for the tournament. Of the remaining slots, 21 were given to the cup winners of the regional football associations, the Verbandspokal. The three remaining slots were given to the three regional associations with the most men's teams, which were Bavaria, Lower Saxony and Westphalia. The best-placed amateur team of the Regionalliga Bayern was given the spot for Bavaria. For Lower Saxony, the Lower Saxony Cup was split into two paths: one for 3. Liga and Regionalliga Nord teams, and the other for amateur teams. The winners of each path qualified. For Westphalia, the spot rotated each season between the best-placed Westphalian team of the Regionalliga West and the best-placed amateur team of the Oberliga Westfalen. For the 2024–25 DFB-Pokal, this spot was awarded to a team from the Oberliga. As every team was entitled to participate in local tournaments which qualified for the association cups, every team could in principle compete in the DFB-Pokal. Reserve teams and combined football sections were not permitted to enter, along with no two teams of the same association or corporation.

=== Draw ===
The draws for the different rounds were conducted as follows:

For the first round, the participating teams were split into two pots of 32 teams each. The first pot contained all teams which qualified through their regional cup competitions, the best four teams of the 3. Liga, and the bottom four teams of the 2. Bundesliga. Every team from this pot was drawn to a team from the second pot, which contained all remaining professional teams (all the teams of the Bundesliga and the remaining fourteen 2. Bundesliga teams). The teams from the first pot were set as the home team in the process.

The two-pot scenario was also applied for the second round, with the remaining 3. Liga and/or amateur team(s) in the first pot and the remaining Bundesliga and 2. Bundesliga teams in the other pot. Once again, the 3. Liga and/or amateur team(s) served as hosts. This time the pots did not have to be of equal size though, depending on the results of the first round. Theoretically, it was even possible that there could be only one pot, if all of the teams from one of the pots from the first round beat all the others in the second pot. Once one pot was empty, the remaining pairings were drawn from the other pot, with the first-drawn team for a match serving as hosts.

For the remaining rounds, the draw was conducted from just one pot. Any remaining 3. Liga and/or amateur team(s) were the home team if drawn against a professional team. In every other case, the first-drawn team served as hosts.

=== Match rules ===
Teams met in one game per round. Matches took place for 90 minutes, with two halves of 45 minutes each. If still tied after regulation, 30 minutes of extra time were played, consisting of two periods of 15 minutes each. If the score was still level after this, the match was decided by a penalty shoot-out. A coin toss decided who took the first penalty. A maximum of nine players could be listed on the substitute bench, while a maximum of five substitutions were allowed. However, each team was only given three opportunities to make substitutions, with a fourth opportunity in extra time, excluding substitutions made at half-time, before the start of extra time and at half-time in extra time. From the round of 16 onward, a video assistant referee was appointed for all DFB-Pokal matches. Though technically possible, VAR was not used for home matches of Bundesliga clubs prior to the round of 16 in order to provide a uniform approach to all matches.

=== Suspensions ===
If a player received five yellow cards in the competition, he was then suspended from the next cup match. Similarly, receiving a second yellow card suspended a player from the next cup match. If a player received a direct red card, they were suspended a minimum of one match, but the German Football Association reserved the right to increase the suspension.

=== International qualification ===
The winners of the DFB-Pokal earned automatic qualification for the league phase of next season's edition of the UEFA Europa League. If they had already qualified for the UEFA Champions League through position in the Bundesliga, then the spot went to the team in sixth place, and the league's UEFA Conference League play-off round spot to the team in seventh place. The winners will also host the Franz Beckenbauer Supercup at the start of the next season, and will face the champions of the previous year's Bundesliga, unless the same team wins the Bundesliga and the DFB-Pokal, completing a double. In that case, the runners-up of the Bundesliga took the spot and hosted instead.

== Schedule ==
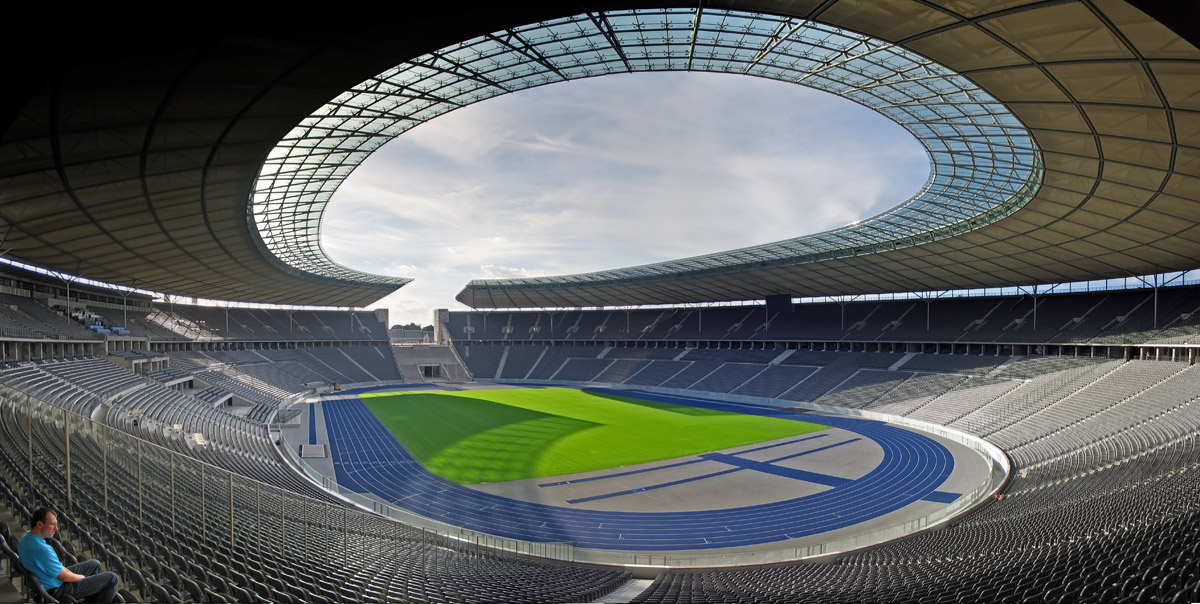
The Olympiastadion in Berlin hosted the final.

All draws were generally held on a Sunday evening after each round (unless noted otherwise).

The rounds of the 2024–25 competition were scheduled as follows:

Round	Draw date	Matches
First round	1 June 2024	16–19 August & 27–28 August 2024
Second round	1 September 2024	29–30 October 2024
Round of 16	3 November 2024	3–4 December 2024
Quarter-finals	15 December 2024	4–5 February & 25–26 February 2025
Semi-finals	2 March 2025	1–2 April 2025
Final	2 March 2025	24 May 2025 at Olympiastadion, Berlin

== Matches ==
Times up to 27 October 2024 and from 30 March 2025 are CEST (UTC+2). Times from 28 October 2024 to 29 March 2025 are CET (UTC+1).

=== First round ===
The draw took place on 23 June 2024, with Nils Petersen drawing the matches. Thirty of the thirty-two matches took place from 16 to 19 August 2024. The remaining two matches, involving the participants of the 2024 DFL-Supercup (played on 17 August), took place on 27 and 28 August 2024.

16 August 2024	Würzburger Kickers	2–2 (a.e.t.) (3–5 p)	TSG Hoffenheim	Würzburg
18:00	Küc 11'; Hannemann 100'	Report	Farahnak 19' (o.g.); Bülter 107'	Stadium: Akon Arena; Attendance: 9,511; Referee: Martin Petersen
	Penalties
	Hannemann (penalty scored); Wessig (penalty scored); Meisel (penalty missed); Zaiser (penalty scored)		(penalty scored) Kramarić; (penalty scored) Berisha; (penalty scored) Bülter; (penalty scored) Stach; (penalty scored) Justvan

16 August 2024	Wehen Wiesbaden	1–3 (a.e.t.)	Mainz 05	Wiesbaden
18:00	Gözüsirin 15'	Report	Kohr 59'; Burkardt 113'; Amiri 120+1'	Stadium: BRITA-Arena; Attendance: 12,500; Referee: Richard Hempel

16 August 2024	Hallescher FC	2–3 (a.e.t.)	FC St. Pauli	Halle
18:00	Akono 11'; Hauptmann 62'	Report	Eggestein 48'; Dźwigała 90+4'; Ritzka 110'	Stadium: Leuna-Chemie-Stadion; Attendance: 14,000; Referee: Daniel Siebert

16 August 2024	SSV Ulm	0–4	Bayern Munich	Ulm
20:45		Report	Müller 12', 14'; Coman 79'; Kane 90+3'	Stadium: Donaustadion; Attendance: 17,400; Referee: Sven Jablonski

17 August 2024	Schott Mainz	0–2	Greuther Fürth	Mainz
13:00		Report	Srbeny 8'; Mustapha 82'	Stadium: Bruchwegstadion; Attendance: 4,235; Referee: Felix Prigan

17 August 2024	Erzgebirge Aue	1–3	Borussia Mönchengladbach	Aue
13:00	Clausen 8'	Report	Honorat 35'; Netz 52'; Pléa 70'	Stadium: Erzgebirgsstadion; Attendance: 14,811; Referee: Florian Badstübner

17 August 2024	Greifswalder FC	0–1	Union Berlin	Greifswald
15:30		Report	Vertessen 67'	Stadium: Volksstadion Greifswald; Attendance: 4,990; Referee: Lukas Benen

17 August 2024	FC 08 Villingen	0–4	1. FC Heidenheim	Villingen
15:30		Report	Breunig 43', 48', 54'; Wanner 52'	Stadium: MS-Technologie-Arena; Attendance: 6,800; Referee: Fabienne Michel

17 August 2024	Rot-Weiss Essen	1–4	RB Leipzig	Essen
15:30	Safi 2'	Report	Šeško 12'; Openda 40'; Nusa 84'; Simons 88'	Stadium: Stadion an der Hafenstraße; Attendance: 17,000; Referee: Christian Dingert

17 August 2024	FC Ingolstadt	1–2	1. FC Kaiserslautern	Ingolstadt
15:30	Malone 88'	Report	Mause 3', 36'	Stadium: Audi Sportpark; Attendance: 11,655; Referee: Robin Braun

17 August 2024	VfR Aalen	0–2	Schalke 04	Aalen
15:30		Report	Karaman 31'; Mohr 68'	Stadium: Städtisches Waldstadion; Attendance: 10,850; Referee: Felix Brych

17 August 2024	VfL Osnabrück	0–4	SC Freiburg	Osnabrück
15:30		Report	Höler 30'; Grifo 33'; Adamu 73', 90+4'	Stadium: Stadion an der Bremer Brücke; Attendance: 15,500; Referee: Tobias Reichel

17 August 2024	Alemannia Aachen	2–3	Holstein Kiel	Aachen
18:00	Hanraths 28'; Benschop 60'	Report	Machino 16'; Rosenboom 82', 90+1'	Stadium: Tivoli; Attendance: 29,555; Referee: Michael Bacher

17 August 2024	Arminia Bielefeld	2–0	Hannover 96	Bielefeld
18:00	Becker 14'; Oppie 21'	Report		Stadium: Schüco-Arena; Attendance: 26,044; Referee: Robert Hartmann

17 August 2024	Phönix Lübeck	1–4	Borussia Dortmund	Hamburg
18:00	Iloka 55'	Report	Anton 3'; Can 31' (pen.); Brandt 45+1'; Duranville 62'	Stadium: Volksparkstadion; Attendance: 50,971; Referee: Max Burda

18 August 2024	Viktoria Berlin	1–4	FC Augsburg	Berlin
13:00	Liu 4'	Report	Rexhbecaj 33'; Essende 53'; Dorsch 87'; Tietz 90+2'	Stadium: Stadion Lichterfelde; Attendance: 5,504; Referee: Eric Weisbach

18 August 2024	1. FC Saarbrücken	1–1 (a.e.t.) (3–5 p)	1. FC Nürnberg	Saarbrücken
13:00	Brünker 80'	Report	Ševčík 12'	Stadium: Ludwigsparkstadion; Attendance: 14,868; Referee: Bastian Dankert
	Penalties
	Rizzuto (penalty scored); Civeja (penalty scored); Zeitz (penalty missed); Brünker (penalty scored)		(penalty scored) Duman; (penalty scored) Flick; (penalty scored) Serra; (penalty scored) Schleimer; (penalty scored) Lubach

18 August 2024	Teutonia Ottensen	1–3	Darmstadt 98	Hamburg
15:30	Stark 49'	Report	Klefisch 19'; Nürnberger 28' (pen.); Vilhelmsson 62'	Stadium: Millerntor-Stadion; Attendance: 6,487; Referee: Florian Lechner

18 August 2024	Jahn Regensburg	1–0	VfL Bochum	Regensburg
15:30	Ballas 70'	Report		Stadium: Jahnstadion Regensburg; Attendance: 12,581; Referee: Florian Heft

18 August 2024	Bremer SV	0–4	SC Paderborn	Bremen
15:30		Report	Grimaldi 21', 58'; Castañeda 51'; Michel 52'	Stadium: Stadion am Panzenberg; Attendance: 3,500; Referee: Martin Speckner

18 August 2024	VfV Hildesheim	0–7	SV Elversberg	Hildesheim
15:30		Report	Schnellbacher 17'; Fellhauer 32'; Schulze 43' (o.g.); Stock 51'; Schmahl 62'; Sickinger 76'; Boyamba 78'	Stadium: Friedrich-Ebert-Stadion; Attendance: 5,186; Referee: Assad Nouhoum

18 August 2024	SV Sandhausen	2–3 (a.e.t.)	1. FC Köln	Sandhausen
15:30	Halimi 59' (pen.); Meier 90+6'	Report	Pauli 20'; Maina 34'; Olesen 116'	Stadium: GP Stadion am Hardtwald; Attendance: 9,705; Referee: Benjamin Brand

18 August 2024	Hansa Rostock	1–5	Hertha BSC	Rostock
15:30	Berisha 46'	Report	Scherhant 38'; Maza 66'; Winkler 75'; Niederlechner 85', 88'	Stadium: Ostseestadion; Attendance: 25,600; Referee: Robert Schröder

18 August 2024	Dynamo Dresden	2–0	Fortuna Düsseldorf	Dresden
18:00	Daferner 18'; Meißner 68'	Report		Stadium: Rudolf-Harbig-Stadion; Attendance: 29,660; Referee: Sascha Stegemann

18 August 2024	Sportfreunde Lotte	0–5	Karlsruher SC	Lotte
18:00		Report	Herold 2'; Wanitzek 21'; Sabah 49' (o.g.); Zivzivadze 69'; Conté 82'	Stadium: Stadion am Lotter Kreuz; Attendance: 4,637; Referee: Konrad Oldhafer

18 August 2024	SV Meppen	1–7	Hamburger SV	Meppen
18:00	Haritonov 90'	Report	Pherai 17', 59'; Muheim 31'; Selke 56'; Baldé 71'; Pünt 80' (o.g.); Glatzel 89'	Stadium: Hänsch-Arena; Attendance: 12,959; Referee: Felix Zwayer

19 August 2024	Energie Cottbus	1–3	Werder Bremen	Cottbus
18:00	Rorig 70'	Report	Topp 32', 37', 55'	Stadium: Stadion der Freundschaft; Attendance: 20,000; Referee: Harm Osmers

19 August 2024	TuS Koblenz	0–1	VfL Wolfsburg	Koblenz
18:00		Report	Wimmer 15'	Stadium: Stadion Oberwerth; Attendance: 9,447; Referee: Sören Storks

19 August 2024	Kickers Offenbach	2–1	1. FC Magdeburg	Offenbach
18:00	Sorge 31'; Mustafa 74'	Report	Kaars 54'	Stadium: Stadion am Bieberer Berg; Attendance: 16,847; Referee: Patrick Alt

19 August 2024	Eintracht Braunschweig	1–4	Eintracht Frankfurt	Braunschweig
20:45	Szabó 89'	Report	Chaïbi 52'; Ekitike 56', 61'; Matanović 88'	Stadium: Eintracht-Stadion; Attendance: 21,201; Referee: Florian Exner

27 August 2024	Preußen Münster	0–5	VfB Stuttgart	Münster
20:45		Report	Stiller 7'; Demirović 15'; Stenzel 35'; Woltemade 72'; Karazor 80' (pen.)	Stadium: Preußenstadion; Attendance: 12,672; Referee: Matthias Jöllenbeck

28 August 2024	Carl Zeiss Jena	0–1	Bayer Leverkusen	Jena
18:00		Report	Hofmann 52'	Stadium: Ernst-Abbe-Sportfeld; Attendance: 15,000; Referee: Tobias Welz

=== Second round ===
The draw took place on 1 September 2024, with Sonja Greinacher drawing the matches. The matches took place on 29 and 30 October 2024.

29 October 2024	Bayer Leverkusen	3–0	SV Elversberg	Leverkusen
18:00	Schick 2', 9'; García 36'	Report		Stadium: BayArena; Attendance: 29,787; Referee: Benjamin Brand

29 October 2024	Kickers Offenbach	0–2	Karlsruher SC	Offenbach
18:00		Report	Zivzivadze 62'; Beifus 72'	Stadium: Stadion am Bieberer Berg; Attendance: 20,071; Referee: Lars Erbst

29 October 2024	FC Augsburg	3–0	Schalke 04	Augsburg
18:00	Claude-Maurice 26'; Maier 87'; Essende 90'	Report		Stadium: WWK Arena; Attendance: 27,511; Referee: Frank Willenborg

29 October 2024	RB Leipzig	4–2	FC St. Pauli	Leipzig
18:00	Poulsen 12', 30'; Baumgartner 17'; Nusa 80'	Report	Guilavogui 28'; Smith 58'	Stadium: Red Bull Arena; Attendance: 40,478; Referee: Felix Zwayer

29 October 2024	VfB Stuttgart	2–1	1. FC Kaiserslautern	Stuttgart
20:45	Woltemade 14'; Führich 76'	Report	Tomiak 43' (pen.)	Stadium: MHPArena; Attendance: 60,000; Referee: Daniel Schlager

29 October 2024	1. FC Köln	3–0	Holstein Kiel	Cologne
20:45	Lemperle 8'; Waldschmidt 84', 90+7'	Report		Stadium: RheinEnergieStadion; Attendance: 50,000; Referee: Bastian Dankert

29 October 2024	VfL Wolfsburg	1–0 (a.e.t.)	Borussia Dortmund	Wolfsburg
20:45	Wind 117'	Report		Stadium: Volkswagen Arena; Attendance: 30,000; Referee: Daniel Siebert

29 October 2024	Jahn Regensburg	1–0	Greuther Fürth	Regensburg
20:45	Bulić 59'	Report		Stadium: Jahnstadion Regensburg; Attendance: 11,627; Referee: Tom Bauer

30 October 2024	SC Freiburg	2–1	Hamburger SV	Freiburg
18:00	Ginter 19'; Grifo 44' (pen.)	Report	Meffert 51'	Stadium: Europa-Park Stadion; Attendance: 34,500; Referee: Felix Brych

30 October 2024	Hertha BSC	2–1	1. FC Heidenheim	Berlin
18:00	Scherhant 16'; Cuisance 74'	Report	Schimmer 89'	Stadium: Olympiastadion; Attendance: 44,135; Referee: Robert Kampka

30 October 2024	Eintracht Frankfurt	2–1	Borussia Mönchengladbach	Frankfurt
18:00	Ekitike 45+2'; Marmoush 70'	Report	Itakura 47'	Stadium: Deutsche Bank Park; Attendance: 58,000; Referee: Matthias Jöllenbeck

30 October 2024	SC Paderborn	0–1	Werder Bremen	Paderborn
18:00		Report	Ducksch 30'	Stadium: Home Deluxe Arena; Attendance: 15,000; Referee: Max Burda

30 October 2024	Arminia Bielefeld	2–0	Union Berlin	Bielefeld
20:45	Wörl 12'; Becker 71'	Report		Stadium: Schüco-Arena; Attendance: 26,117; Referee: Wolfgang Haslberger

30 October 2024	TSG Hoffenheim	2–1	1. FC Nürnberg	Sinsheim
20:45	Tabaković 27'; Chaves 71'	Report	Emreli 47'	Stadium: PreZero Arena; Attendance: 18,001; Referee: Timo Gerach

30 October 2024	Dynamo Dresden	2–3 (a.e.t.)	Darmstadt 98	Dresden
20:45	Lemmer 84', 90+10'	Report	Vukotić 56'; Kempe 90+2' (pen.); Lidberg 98'	Stadium: Rudolf-Harbig-Stadion; Attendance: 30,070; Referee: Tobias Stieler

30 October 2024	Mainz 05	0–4	Bayern Munich	Mainz
20:45		Report	Musiala 2', 37', 45+4'; Sané 45+1'	Stadium: Mewa Arena; Attendance: 33,305; Referee: Sascha Stegemann

=== Round of 16 ===
The draw took place on 3 November 2024, with André Schnura and Rudi Völler drawing the matches. The matches took place on 3 and 4 December 2024.

3 December 2024	Arminia Bielefeld	3–1	SC Freiburg	Bielefeld
18:00	Lannert 28'; Kania 36' (pen.); Oppie 81'	Report	Gregoritsch 63'	Stadium: Schüco-Arena; Attendance: 26,311; Referee: Frank Willenborg

3 December 2024	Jahn Regensburg	0–3	VfB Stuttgart	Regensburg
18:00		Report	Millot 10'; Chase 19'; Woltemade 61'	Stadium: Jahnstadion Regensburg; Attendance: 15,210; Referee: Florian Badstübner

3 December 2024	Bayern Munich	0–1	Bayer Leverkusen	Munich
20:45		Report	Tella 69'	Stadium: Allianz Arena; Attendance: 75,000; Referee: Harm Osmers

3 December 2024	Werder Bremen	1–0	Darmstadt 98	Bremen
20:45	Jung 90+4'	Report		Stadium: Weserstadion; Attendance: 40,000; Referee: Martin Petersen

4 December 2024	1. FC Köln	2–1 (a.e.t.)	Hertha BSC	Cologne
18:00	Niederlechner 30' (o.g.); Ljubičić 120+1' (pen.)	Report	Maza 12' (pen.)	Stadium: RheinEnergieStadion; Attendance: 50,000; Referee: Tobias Reichel

4 December 2024	VfL Wolfsburg	3–0	TSG Hoffenheim	Wolfsburg
18:00	Vavro 63'; Wind 67'; Gerhardt 85'	Report		Stadium: Volkswagen Arena; Attendance: 13,909; Referee: Daniel Schlager

4 December 2024	RB Leipzig	3–0	Eintracht Frankfurt	Leipzig
20:45	Šeško 31'; Openda 50', 58'	Report		Stadium: Red Bull Arena; Attendance: 37,187; Referee: Sven Jablonski

4 December 2024	Karlsruher SC	2–2 (a.e.t.) (4–5 p)	FC Augsburg	Karlsruhe
20:45	Schleusener 54'; Wanitzek 111'	Report	Essende 40'; Vargas 120+3'	Stadium: Wildparkstadion; Attendance: 28,422; Referee: Tobias Stieler
	Penalties
	Wanitzek (penalty scored); Hunziker (penalty scored); Beifus (penalty scored); Herold (penalty scored); Heußer (penalty missed)		(penalty scored) Tietz; (penalty scored) Schlotterbeck; (penalty scored) Vargas; (penalty scored) Rexhbeçaj; (penalty scored) Bauer

=== Quarter-finals ===
The draw took place on 15 December 2024, with Julian Köster drawing the matches. The matches took place between 4 and 26 February 2025.

4 February 2025	VfB Stuttgart	1–0	FC Augsburg	Stuttgart
20:45	Undav 30'	Report		Stadium: MHPArena; Attendance: 59,000; Referee: Sascha Stegemann

5 February 2025	Bayer Leverkusen	3–2 (a.e.t.)	1. FC Köln	Leverkusen
20:45	Schick 61', 90+6'; Boniface 98'	Report	Downs 45+10'; Maina 54'	Stadium: BayArena; Attendance: 30,210; Referee: Frank Willenborg

25 February 2025	Arminia Bielefeld	2–1	Werder Bremen	Bielefeld
20:45	Wörl 35'; Malatini 41' (o.g.)	Report	Burke 56'	Stadium: Schüco-Arena; Attendance: 26,601; Referee: Robert Hartmann

26 February 2025	RB Leipzig	1–0	VfL Wolfsburg	Leipzig
20:45	Šeško 69' (pen.)	Report		Stadium: Red Bull Arena; Attendance: 40,478; Referee: Tobias Reichel

=== Semi-finals ===
The draw took place on 2 March 2025, with Gerald Asamoah drawing the matches. The matches took place on 1 and 2 April 2025.

1 April 2025	Arminia Bielefeld	2–1	Bayer Leverkusen	Bielefeld
20:45	Wörl 20'; Großer 45+3'	Report	Tah 17'	Stadium: Schüco-Arena; Attendance: 26,601; Referee: Harm Osmers

2 April 2025	VfB Stuttgart	3–1	RB Leipzig	Stuttgart
20:45	Stiller 5'; Woltemade 57'; Leweling 73'	Report	Šeško 62'	Stadium: MHPArena; Attendance: 60,000; Referee: Sven Jablonski

=== Final ===
The final took place on 24 May 2025.

24 May 2025
20:00 CEST

Arminia Bielefeld	2–4	VfB Stuttgart
Kania 82'; Vagnoman 85' (o.g.)	Report	Woltemade 15'; Millot 22', 66'; Undav 28'

Olympiastadion, Berlin
Attendance: 74,036
Referee: Christian Dingert (Lebecksmühle)

== Top goalscorers ==
The following were the top scorers of the DFB-Pokal, sorted first by number of goals, and then alphabetically if necessary. Goals scored in penalty shoot-outs are not included.

Rank	Player	Team	Goals
1	(Germany) Nick Woltemade	VfB Stuttgart	5
2	(Czech Republic) Patrik Schick	Bayer Leverkusen	4
2	(Slovenia) Benjamin Šeško	RB Leipzig	4
4	(Germany) Maximilian Breunig	1. FC Heidenheim	3
4	(France) Hugo Ekitike	Eintracht Frankfurt	3
4	(Democratic Republic of the Congo) Samuel Essende	FC Augsburg	3
4	(France) Enzo Millot	VfB Stuttgart	3
4	(Germany) Jamal Musiala	Bayern Munich	3
4	(Belgium) Loïs Openda	RB Leipzig	3
4	(Germany) Keke Topp	Werder Bremen	3
4	(Germany) Marius Wörl	Arminia Bielefeld	3
