= Jonas Kersken =

German footballer (born 2000)

Personal information
- Full name: Jonas Thomas Kersken
- Date of birth: 1 September 2000 (age 26)
- Place of birth: Düsseldorf, Germany
- Height: 1.90 m (6 ft 3 in)
- Position: Goalkeeper

Team information
- Current team: Arminia Bielefeld
- Number: 1

Youth career
- –2017: SG Unterrath
- 2017–2018: SF Baumberg
- 2018–2019: Rot-Weiss Essen

Senior career*
Years	Team	Apps	(Gls)
2019–2024	Borussia Mönchengladbach II	35	(0)
2022–2023	→ SV Meppen (loan)	10	(0)
2023–2024	→ Arminia Bielefeld (loan)	37	(0)
2024–	Arminia Bielefeld	71	(0)
- * Club domestic league appearances and goals as of 18 May 2026

Jonas Thomas Kersken (born 1 September 2000) is a German professional footballer who plays as a goalkeeper for 2. Bundesliga club Arminia Bielefeld.

== Personal life ==
Jonas Kersken was born in Düsseldorf to a German father and an English mother. He also holds a British passport.

== Club career ==
In his youth, Jonas Kersken played for SG Unterrath, Sportfreunde Baumberg and Rot-Weiss Essen, before he joined Borussia Mönchengladbach, where he played for the second team in the fourth-tier Regionalliga West. On 7 August 2020, he signed his first professional contract.

For the 2022–23 season, Kersken signed a deal on loan with 3. Liga team SV Meppen. He started as a first-choice goalkeeper, before he injured. Jonas Kersken has played in only 10 matches. For the 2023–24 season, he signed a deal on loan with 3. Liga side Arminia Bielefeld, a relegated team from 2. Bundesliga.

Following the end of his loan spell at Bielefeld, he left Borussia Mönchengladbach to sign with the 3. Liga club on a permanent basis.

== International career ==
In November 2019, The Football Association and Scottish Football Association contacted Jonas Kersken's agent regarding his potential eligibility to play for England and Scotland, respectively.

== Career statistics ==
As of match played 19 December 2025

Appearances and goals by club, season and competition
Club	Season	League			DFB Pokal		Other		Total	
Club	Season	Division	Apps	Goals	Apps	Goals	Apps	Goals	Apps	Goals
Rot-Weiss Essen	2018–19	Regionalliga West	0	0	—		—		0	0
Borussia Mönchengladbach II	2019–20	Regionalliga West	5	0	—		—		5	0
Borussia Mönchengladbach II	2020–21	Regionalliga West	11	0	—		—		11	0
Borussia Mönchengladbach II	2021–22	Regionalliga West	19	0	—		—		19	0
Borussia Mönchengladbach II	Total		35	0	—		—		35	0
SV Meppen (loan)	2022–23	3. Liga	10	0	—		—		10	0
Arminia Bielefeld (loan)	2023–24	3. Liga	37	0	2	0	—		39	0
Arminia Bielefeld	2024–25	3. Liga	38	0	6	0	—		44	0
Arminia Bielefeld	2025–26	2. Bundesliga	16	0	2	0	—		18	0
Arminia Bielefeld	Total		91	0	10	0	—		101	0
Career total			136	0	10	0	—		146	0

== Honours ==
Arminia Bielefeld

- 3. Liga: 2024–25
- DFB-Pokal
  - Runners-up: 2024–25
- Westphalian Cup: 2024–25
