= Henrik Koch =

Danish researcher, theoretical chemistry

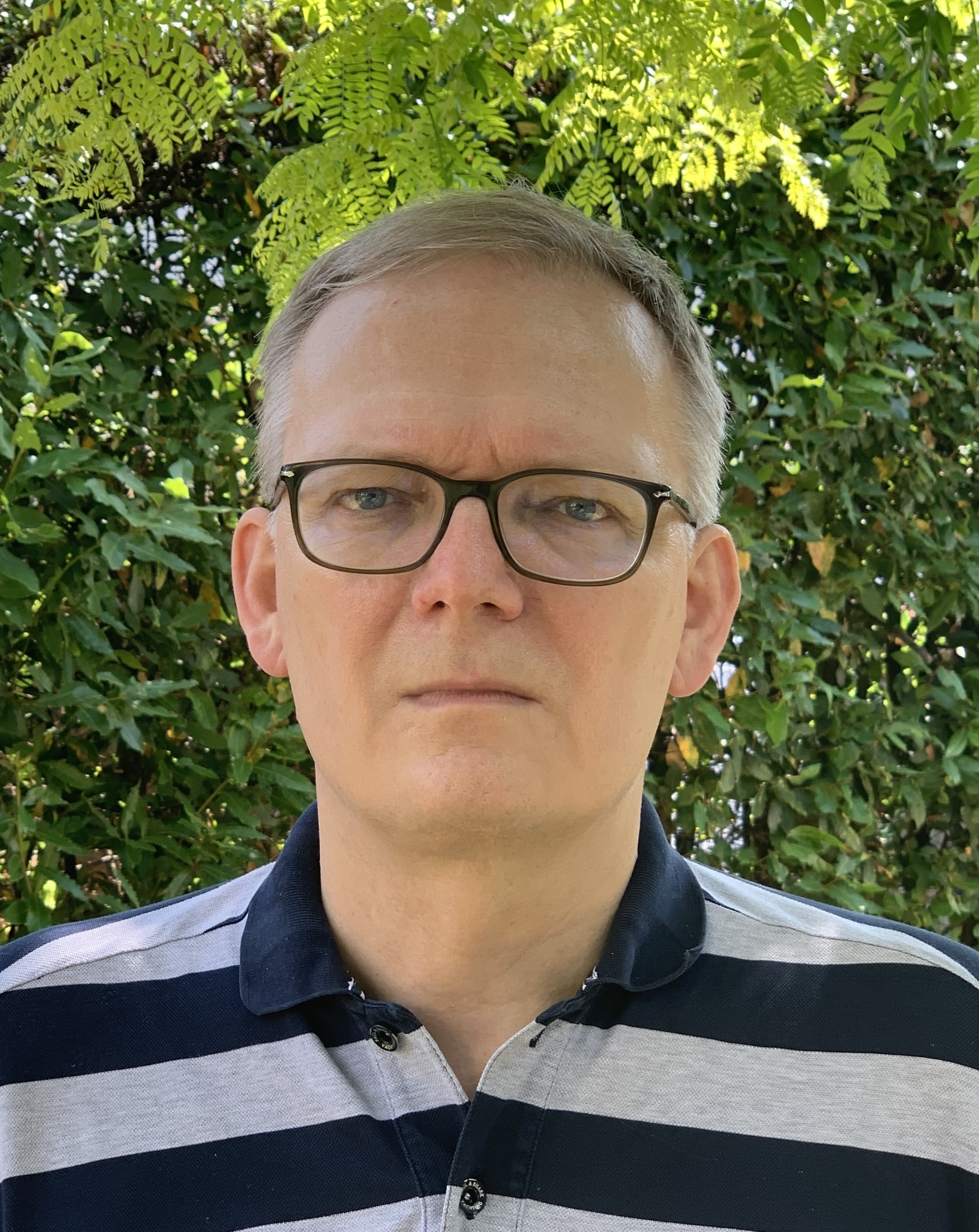
- Koch in 2020
- Born: February 25, 1964 (age 61); Denmark
- Education: Aarhus University (Ph.D. 1991)
- Occupations: Professor in theoretical chemistry at Scuola Normale Superiore di Pisa; Adjunct professor at Norwegian University of Science and Technology
- Scientific career
- Fields: Theoretical chemistry

Henrik Koch (born 1964) is a Danish scientist. His field is theoretical chemistry. He is full professor at Scuola Normale Superiore di Pisa in Italy.

== Education and professional career ==
Koch received his Lic.scient. (Ph.D.) in theoretical chemistry from Aarhus University in Denmark in 1991. In 2002 he was appointed professor at the Natural Science Faculty at the Norwegian University of Science and Technology (NTNU). From 2018 onward he is full professor at Scuola Normale Superiore di Pisa, and adjunct professor at NTNU.

His research activities focus on «development and application of accurate electronic structure methods for molecules in general, and molecules strongly coupled to optical and plasmonic cavities, in particular.» His research group's projects are showcased on their software platform etprogram.org.

He is involved in the QuantumLight project at NTNU. The project focuses on advanced theoretical models for molecules.

== Publications ==
- Recent journal articles
- Koch's profile on Publons, with publications and h-index

== Awards and honours ==
- 2007– : Elected member of the Royal Norwegian Society of Sciences and Letters.
- 2021: Received an ERC Advanced Grant from the European Research Council.
