= Aidan Liu =

American soccer player

Personal information
- Date of birth: July 1, 2000 (age 26)
- Place of birth: Chicago, Illinois, United States
- Height: 6 ft 4 in (1.93 m)
- Position: Defender

Team information
- Current team: Austria Klagenfurt
- Number: 20

Youth career
- 2012–2018: Sockers FC
- 2018–2019: HB Køge
- 2019–2020: Vejle

Senior career*
Years	Team	Apps	(Gls)
2020–2023	Vejle	0	(0)
2020	→ Sydvest 05 (loan)		
2021	→ Indy Eleven (loan)	3	(0)
2022	→ B68 Toftir (loan)	25	(3)
2023	B68 Toftir	14	(0)
2023–2024	Viktoria Berlin	46	(2)
2025	Šibenik	2	(0)
2025–	Austria Klagenfurt	29	(2)
- * Club domestic league appearances and goals as of May 17, 2026

Aidan Liu (born July 1, 2000) is an American professional soccer player who currently plays for Austria Klagenfurt in the Austrian 2. Liga.

== Career ==
=== Youth ===
Liu played club soccer with local side Sockers FC from 2012, before moving to HB Køge in August 2018.

=== Vejle BK ===
After a year with Køge, Liu moved to Vejle ahead of their 2019–20 season. In October 2020, Liu moved on loan to Danish 2nd Division side FC Sydvest 05. On March 16, 2021, Liu returned to the United States, joining USL Championship side Indy Eleven on loan for the season. Following the 2021 season, it was announced that Liu's loan had expired with Indy Eleven.

Liu again went out on loan, joining Faeroe Islands side B68 Toftir on February 22, 2022.

=== Viktoria Berlin ===
On July 29, 2023, Aidan Liu signed a contract with German Regionalliga side Viktoria Berlin.

=== HNK Šibenik ===
On January 3, 2025, Aidan Liu moved to Croatia to play for HNK Šibenik.
