= Maximilian Großer =

German footballer

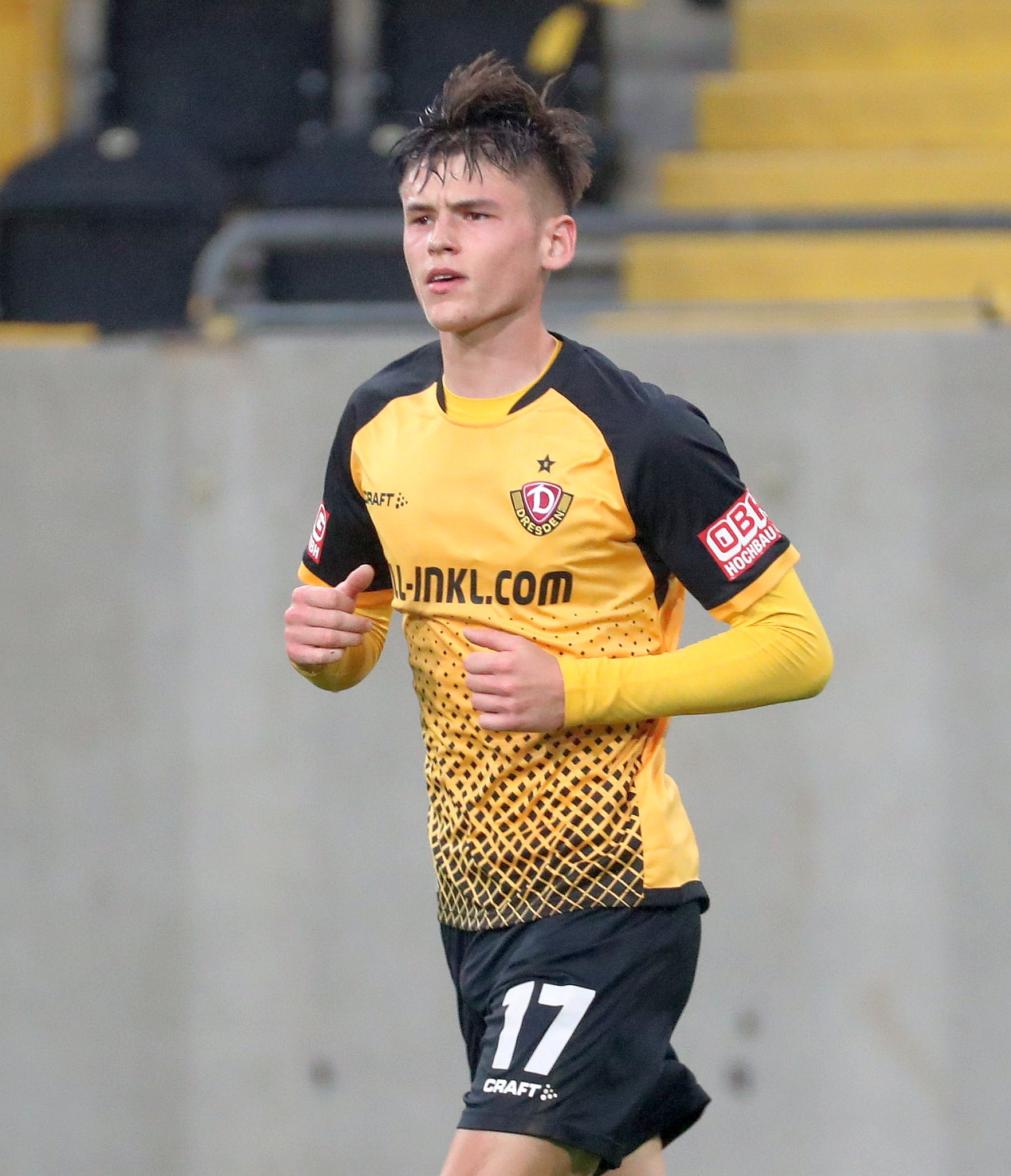
- Großer in 2021

Personal information
- Date of birth: 23 July 2001 (age 25)
- Place of birth: Germany
- Height: 1.89 m (6 ft 2 in)
- Position: Defensive midfielder

Team information
- Current team: Arminia Bielefeld
- Number: 19

Youth career
- 2007–2020: Dynamo Dresden

Senior career*
Years	Team	Apps	(Gls)
2020–2021	Dynamo Dresden	5	(0)
2021–2023	Hamburger SV II	61	(3)
2023–	Arminia Bielefeld	91	(5)
- * Club domestic league appearances and goals as of 18 May 2026

Maximilian Großer (born 23 July 2001) is a German professional footballer who plays as a defensive midfielder for Arminia Bielefeld.

== Career ==
Großer made his professional debut for Dynamo Dresden in the 2. Bundesliga on 28 June 2020, coming on as a substitute in the 90th minute for Linus Wahlqvist in the home match against VfL Osnabrück, which finished as a 2–2 draw.

In June 2023, Großer signed for recently relegated 3. Liga club Arminia Bielefeld.

== Career statistics ==
As of match played 5 April 2025

Appearances and goals by club, season and competition
Club	Season	League			DFB-Pokal		Total	
Club	Season	Division	Apps	Goals	Apps	Goals	Apps	Goals
Arminia Bielefeld	2023–24	3. Liga	26	1	2	0	28	1
Arminia Bielefeld	2024–25	3. Liga	29	2	5	1	34	3
Career total			55	3	7	1	62	4

== Honours ==
Arminia Bielefeld

- 3. Liga: 2024–25
- DFB-Pokal
  - Runners-up: 2024–25
- Westphalian Cup: 2024–25
