= Kaito Mizuta =

Japanese footballer (born 2000)

Kaito Mizuta 水多 海斗
Personal information
- Date of birth: 8 April 2000 (age 26)
- Place of birth: Tokyo, Japan
- Height: 1.82 m (6 ft 0 in)
- Positions: Attacking midfielder; winger

Team information
- Current team: Le Havre
- Number: 17

Youth career
- –2019: Maebashi Ikuei High School

Senior career*
Years	Team	Apps	(Gls)
2019–2021	SV Straelen	60	(17)
2021–2023	Mainz 05	0	(0)
2021–2023	Mainz 05 II	66	(15)
2023–2025	Arminia Bielefeld	39	(6)
2025–2026	Rot-Weiss Essen	53	(11)
2026–	Le Havre	5	(0)
- * Club domestic league appearances and goals as of 18 October 2026

Kaito Mizuta (水多 海斗, Mizuta Kaito; born 8 April 2000) is a Japanese professional footballer who plays as an attacking midfielder or winger for Ligue 1 club Le Havre.

== Career ==
In 2019, Mizuta signed for German fifth-tier side SV Straelen, helping them earn promotion to the German fourth tier. In 2021, he signed for fellow German club Mainz 05 in the Bundesliga. He mostly played for their reserve team Mainz 05 II, appearing twice on the bench for the senior squad.

On 29 January 2025, Mizuta signed for Rot-Weiss Essen in the 3. Liga.

On 7 July 2026, Mizuta signed for Le Havre in Ligue 1.

== Career statistics ==
As of match played 18 October 2026.

Appearances and goals by club, season and competition
Club	Season	League			Cup		Europe		Other		Total	
Club	Season	Division	Apps	Goals	Apps	Goals	Apps	Goals	Apps	Goals	Apps	Goals
SV Straelen	2019–20	Oberliga Niederrhein	21	11	1	0	—		—		22	11
SV Straelen	2020–21	Regionalliga West	39	6	2	0	—		—		41	6
SV Straelen	Total		60	17	3	0	—		—		63	17
Mainz 05	2021–22	Bundesliga	0	0	0	0	0	0	—		0	0
Mainz 05	2022–23	Bundesliga	0	0	0	0	0	0	—		0	0
Mainz 05	Total		0	0	0	0	0	0	—		0	0
Mainz 05 II	2021–22	Regionalliga Südwest	35	5	—		—		—		35	5
Mainz 05 II	2022–23	Regionalliga Südwest	31	10	—		—		—		31	10
Mainz 05 II	Total		66	15	—		—		—		66	15
Arminia Bielefeld	2023–24	3. Liga	28	5	2	0	—		6 (Note: Appearances in Westphalian Cup)	0	36	5
Arminia Bielefeld	2024–25	3. Liga	11	1	2	0	—		3	0	16	1
Arminia Bielefeld	Total		39	6	4	0	—		9	0	52	6
Rot-Weiss Essen	2024–25	3. Liga	17	2	—		—		2 (Note: Appearances in Lower Rhine Cup)	1	19	3
Rot-Weiss Essen	2025–26	3. Liga	36	9	1	0	—		4 (Note: Two appearances in Lower Rhine Cup, two appearances in promotion play-offs)	0	41	9
Rot-Weiss Essen	Total		53	11	1	0	—		6	1	60	12
Le Havre	2026–27	Ligue 1	5	0	0	0	—		—		5	0
Career total			223	49	8	0	0	0	15	1	246	50
