= Lukas Kunze =

German footballer

Personal information
- Date of birth: 14 June 1998 (age 28)
- Place of birth: Bielefeld, Germany
- Height: 1.89 m (6 ft 2 in)
- Position: Midfielder

Team information
- Current team: Arminia Bielefeld
- Number: 13

Youth career
- 2008–2014: VfL Theesen
- 2014–2015: Schalke 04
- 2015–2017: SV Rödinghausen

Senior career*
Years	Team	Apps	(Gls)
2017–2021	SV Rödinghausen	115	(6)
2021–2024	VfL Osnabrück	95	(11)
2024–	Arminia Bielefeld	30	(0)
2025–	Arminia Bielefeld II	1	(0)
2026	→ Hansa Rostock (loan)	12	(1)
- * Club domestic league appearances and goals as of 28 May 2026

Lukas Kunze (born 14 June 1998) is a German professional footballer who plays as a midfielder for 2. Bundesliga club Arminia Bielefeld.

== Early and personal life ==
Kunze was born in Bielefeld. He is the twin brother of fellow professional footballer Fabian Kunze, who plays in the 2. Bundesliga for Hannover 96.

== Career ==
After playing youth football for VfL Theesen, Schalke 04 and SV Rödinghausen, he made his senior debut for SV Rödinghausen on 19 August 2017 in a 3–3 Regionalliga West draw with Rot-Weiß Oberhausen. In June 2021, he signed for 3. Liga club VfL Osnabrück on a long-term contract.

In summer 2024, he transferred to Arminia Bielefeld, joining his brother Fabian at the club.

== Honours ==
Arminia Bielefeld

- 3. Liga: 2024–25
- DFB-Pokal
  - Runners-up: 2024–25
- Westphalian Cup: 2024–25
