= Isaiah Young =

American soccer player (born 1998)

Personal information
- Date of birth: March 30, 1998 (age 28)
- Place of birth: Berlin, New Jersey, United States
- Height: 1.81 m (5 ft 11 in)
- Position: Forward

Team information
- Current team: Arminia Bielefeld
- Number: 30

Youth career
- 2013–2014: Philadelphia Union
- 2015–2016: Players Development Academy
- 2017: Werder Bremen

Senior career*
Years	Team	Apps	(Gls)
2017–2020	Werder Bremen II	54	(2)
2019–2020	→ Union SG (loan)	16	(0)
2020–2024	Rot-Weiss Essen	144	(18)
2024–	Arminia Bielefeld	47	(5)

International career
2016	United States U19	8	(1)
2016	United States U20	4	(1)
- * Club domestic league appearances and goals as of May 18, 2026

Isaiah Young (born March 30, 1998) is an American professional soccer player who plays as a forward for German 2. Bundesliga club Arminia Bielefeld.

== Career ==
Young made his professional debut on the first matchday of the 2017–18 season in the 3. Liga, being substituted on in Werder Bremen II's 3–0 win against SpVgg Unterhaching.

He joined Belgian second-tier side Royale Union Saint-Gilloise on loan for the 2019–20 season.

On October 5, 2020, the last day of the 2020 summer transfer window, Young left Werder Bremen permanently moving to Regionalliga West club Rot-Weiss Essen.

On August 27, 2024, Young signed with Arminia Bielefeld in 3. Liga.

== Honors ==
Arminia Bielefeld

- 3. Liga: 2024–25
