= Leon Schneider =

German footballer (born 2000)

Personal information
- Date of birth: 19 June 2000 (age 26)
- Place of birth: Eisenhüttenstadt, Germany
- Height: 1.84 m (6 ft 0 in)
- Position: Midfielder

Team information
- Current team: Arminia Bielefeld
- Number: 23

Youth career
- SG Aufbau Eisenhüttenstadt
- –2013: FC Eisenhüttenstadt
- 2013–2017: Energie Cottbus

Senior career*
| Years | Team | Apps | (Gls) |
| 2017–2019 | Energie Cottbus | 18 | (0) |
| 2019–2023 | 1. FC Köln II | 40 | (1) |
| 2020–2021 | → KFC Uerdingen 05 (loan) | 18 | (0) |
| 2021–2022 | → Würzburger Kickers (loan) | 32 | (1) |
| 2023– | Arminia Bielefeld | 83 | (3) |
- * Club domestic league appearances and goals as of 18 May 2026

Leon Schneider (born 19 June 2000) is a German professional footballer who plays as a midfielder for 2. Bundesliga club Arminia Bielefeld.

== Career ==
Schneider made his professional debut for Energie Cottbus in the 3. Liga on 10 October 2018, coming on as a substitute in the 79th minute for Paul Gehrmann in the 1–2 home loss against Hallescher FC. On 26 July 2020, Schneider joined KFC Uerdingen 05 on a one-year loan deal.

On 6 July 2023, Schneider signed with Arminia Bielefeld.

== Honours ==
Energie Cottbus

- Brandenburg Cup: 2017–18, 2018–19
