= Gerrit Gohlke =

German footballer

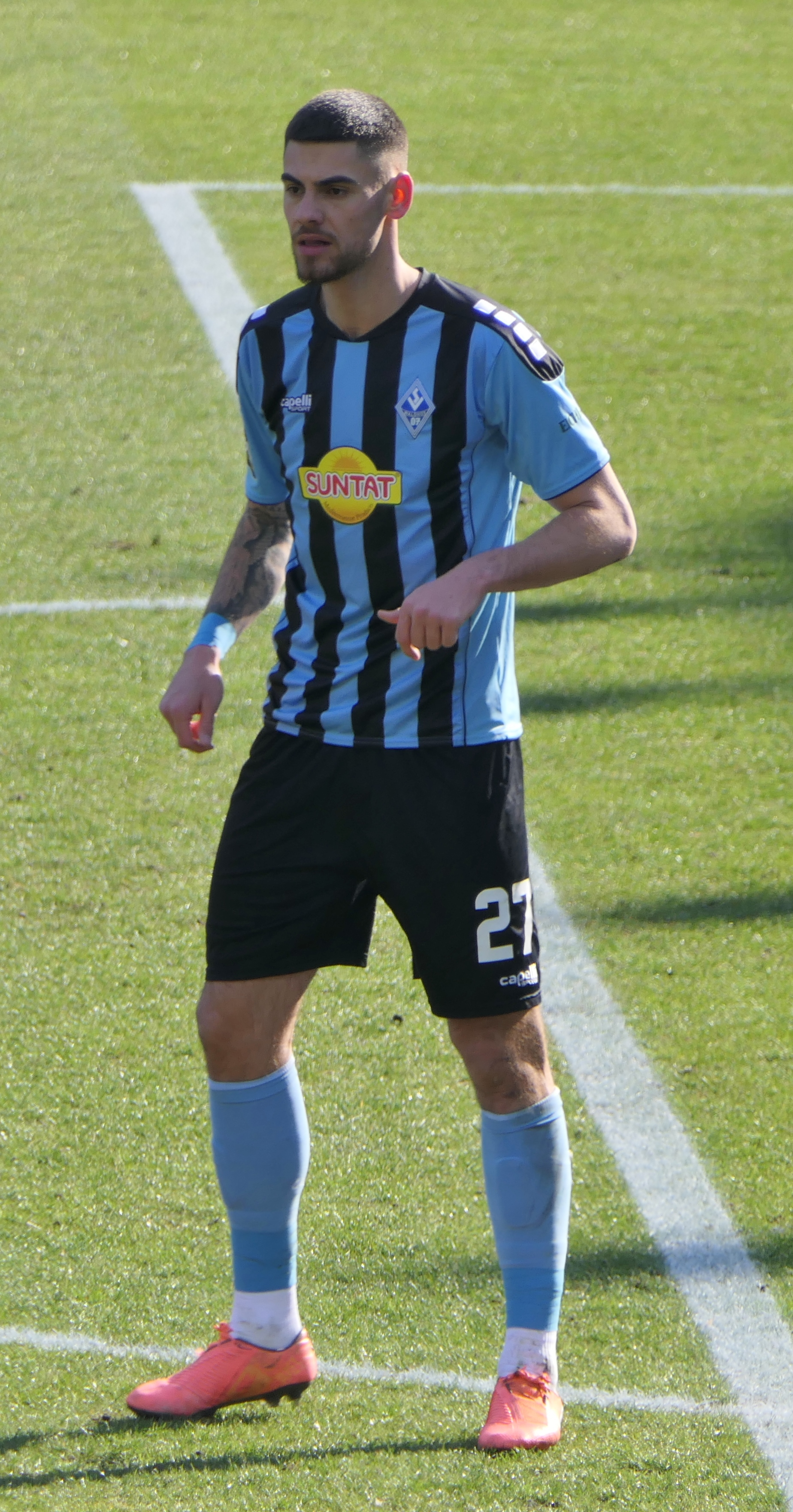

Personal information
- Date of birth: 12 March 1999 (age 27)
- Place of birth: Darmstadt, Germany
- Height: 1.92 m (6 ft 4 in)
- Position: Centre-back

Youth career
- 2008–2017: Kickers Offenbach

Senior career*
Years	Team	Apps	(Gls)
2017–2020	Kickers Offenbach	16	(0)
2020–2023	Waldhof Mannheim	60	(2)
2023–2024	Arminia Bielefeld	19	(2)
- * Club domestic league appearances and goals as of 15 September 2024

Gerrit Gohlke (born 12 March 1999) is a German professional footballer who plays as a centre-back. He scored on his home debut in a 4:0 victory in a derby match against Preußen Münster.

== Career statistics ==
As of match played 1 July 2021

Appearances and goals by club, season and competition
Club	Season	League			DFB-Pokal		Other		Total	
Club	Season	Division	Apps	Goals	Apps	Goals	Apps	Goals	Apps	Goals
Kickers Offenbach	2017–18	Regionalliga Südwest	1	0	—		0	0	1	0
Kickers Offenbach	2018–19	Regionalliga Südwest	4	0	—		0	0	4	0
Kickers Offenbach	2019–20	Regionalliga Südwest	11	0	—		0	0	11	0
Kickers Offenbach	Total		16	0	0	0	0	0	16	0
Waldhof Mannheim	2019–20	3. Liga	8	1	0	0	0	0	8	1
Waldhof Mannheim	2020–21	3. Liga	28	0	0	0	0	0	28	0
Waldhof Mannheim	Total		36	1	0	0	0	0	36	1
Career total			52	1	0	0	0	0	52	1
