= Merveille Biankadi =

German footballer (born 1995)

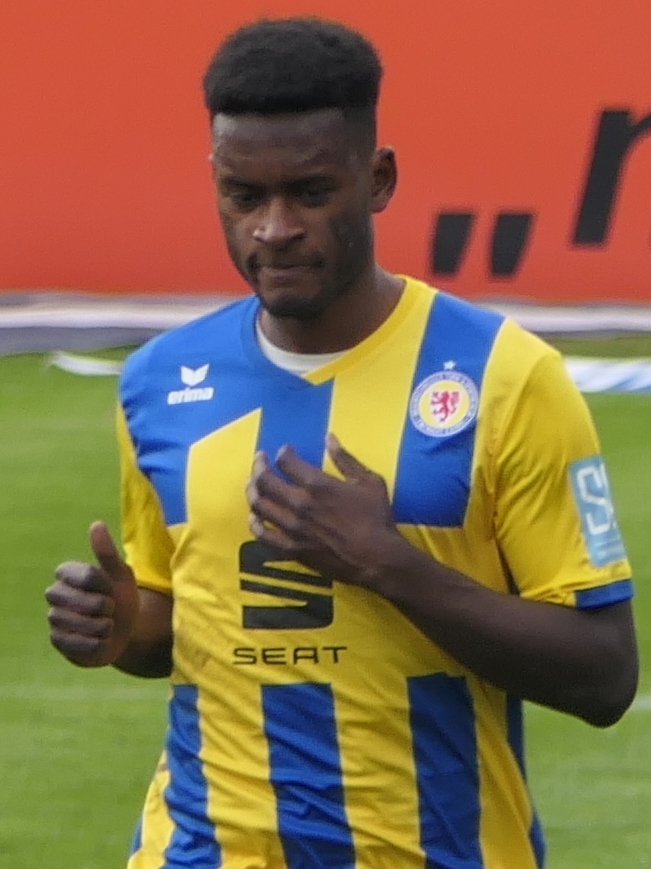
- Biankadi with Eintracht Braunschweig in January 2020

Personal information
- Date of birth: 9 May 1995 (age 31)
- Place of birth: Munich, Germany
- Height: 1.84 m (6 ft 0 in)
- Position: Midfielder

Team information
- Current team: SGV Heilbronn-Freiberg
- Number: 23

Youth career
- FC Phönix München
- –2012: Bayern Munich
- 2012–2014: FC Augsburg

Senior career*
Years	Team	Apps	(Gls)
2013–2015	FC Augsburg II	30	(5)
2015–2017	SV Elversberg	50	(2)
2015	SV Elversberg II	1	(0)
2017–2018	Rot-Weiß Erfurt	34	(1)
2018–2019	Hansa Rostock	37	(10)
2019–2023	1. FC Heidenheim	6	(0)
2020	→ Eintracht Braunschweig (loan)	17	(3)
2021–2022	→ 1860 Munich (loan)	55	(11)
2023–2025	Arminia Bielefeld	65	(13)
2025–2026	Energie Cottbus	19	(3)
2026–	SGV Heilbronn-Freiberg	2	(0)
- * Club domestic league appearances and goals as of 24 September 2026

Merveille Biankadi (born 9 May 1995) is a German professional footballer who plays as a midfielder for SGV Heilbronn-Freiberg.

== Career ==
Born in Munich, Biankadi played youth football with FC Phönix München, Bayern Munich and FC Augsburg. He played for FC Augsburg II, SV Elversberg, FC Rot-Weiß Erfurt and FC Hansa Rostock before signing with Heidenheim. In January 2021, Heidenheim loaned Biankadi to his hometown club TSV 1860 Munich. Biankadi signed for Arminia Bielefeld on 24 June 2023 on a free transfer. He scored on his debut in a 3:1 loss to Dynamo Dresden.

On 15 September 2025, Biankadi signed with Energie Cottbus in 3. Liga.

== Personal life ==
Born in Germany, Biankadi is of Congolese descent.

== Honours ==
Arminia Bielefeld

- 3. Liga: 2024–25
