= Louis Oppie =

German footballer (born 2002)

Personal information
- Date of birth: 17 May 2002 (age 24)
- Place of birth: Berlin, Germany
- Height: 1.84 m (6 ft 0 in)
- Position: Left back

Team information
- Current team: FC St. Pauli
- Number: 23

Youth career
- 2009–2017: Hertha BSC
- 2017–2018: Hertha Zehlendorf
- 2018–2021: Hannover 96

Senior career*
Years	Team	Apps	(Gls)
2021–2023	Hannover 96 II	61	(2)
2023–2025	Arminia Bielefeld	71	(7)
2025–	FC St. Pauli	32	(1)
- * Club domestic league appearances and goals as of 20:30, 23 October 2026 (UTC)

Louis Oppie (born 17 May 2002) is a German professional footballer who plays as a left back for 2. Bundesliga club FC St. Pauli.

== Career ==
=== Hannover 96 ===
Born in Berlin, Oppie was a member of Hertha BSC's youth system from 2009 to 2017. He spent one year at Hertha Zehlendorf, also in the capital city, before joining Hannover 96. In 2022–23, he played 34 games, scored two goals and assisted four for the reserve team in the fourth-tier Regionalliga.

=== Arminia Bielefeld ===
Oppie's youth contract with Hannover 96 was expiring in June 2023, and the club wished to offer him a professional deal, but he instead opted to join Arminia Bielefeld, newly relegated to the 3. Liga. Sporting director Michael Mutzel highlighted his versatility in defensive positions.

In 2024–25, Arminia won promotion as champions, and finished as runners-up in the DFB-Pokal. Oppie scored in a 2–0 home win over Hannover 96 on 17 August, and a 3–1 victory over Bundesliga side SC Freiburg in the last 16 on 3 December. In the final on 24 May, he took a shot in the first 25 seconds against VfB Stuttgart at his hometown's Olympiastadion, but also gave the ball away for Enzo Millot to score the decisive goal of a 4–2 defeat. Five days later, the team won the Westphalia Cup with Oppie being substituted at half time in a 2–0 win over Sportfreunde Lotte.

=== FC St. Pauli ===
On 11 July 2025, Oppie signed with Bundesliga club FC St. Pauli. Neither club disclosed any contractual detail about the transfer. He made his debut on 16 August in the first round of the cup, playing the full 120 minutes of a goalless draw with fourth-tier FC Eintracht Norderstedt 03 and scoring in the 3–2 penalty shootout win; his team were the away team but playing at their own Millerntor-Stadion.

== Career statistics ==
As of match played 23 October 2026

Appearances and goals by club, season and competition
Club	Season	League			Cup		Other		Total	
Club	Season	Division	Apps	Goals	Apps	Goals	Apps	Goals	Apps	Goals
Hannover 96 II	2021–22	Regionalliga Nord	27	0	—		—		27	0
Hannover 96 II	2022–23	Regionalliga Nord	34	2	—		—		34	2
Hannover 96 II	Total		61	2	—		—		61	2
Arminia Bielefeld	2023–24	3. Liga	34	4	2	0	6 (Note: Appearances in Westphalian Cup)	2	42	6
Arminia Bielefeld	2024–25	3. Liga	37	3	6	2	4	0	47	5
Arminia Bielefeld	Total		71	7	8	2	10	2	89	11
FC St. Pauli	2025–26	Bundesliga	23	1	4	1	—		27	2
FC St. Pauli	2026–27	2. Bundesliga	9	0	1	0	—		10	0
FC St. Pauli	Total		32	1	5	1	—		37	2
Career total			164	10	13	3	10	2	186	15

== Honours ==
Arminia Bielefeld

- 3. Liga: 2024–25
- Westphalian Cup: 2024–25
