= André Becker =

Brazilian footballer (born 1996)

Personal information
- Date of birth: 26 July 1996 (age 30)
- Place of birth: Recife, Brazil
- Height: 1.97 m (6 ft 6 in)
- Position: Centre-forward

Team information
- Current team: SSV Ulm
- Number: 49

Youth career
- –2014: VfR Mannheim
- 2014–2015: Waldhof Mannheim

Senior career*
Years	Team	Apps	(Gls)
2015	Waldhof Mannheim II	6	(1)
2015–2020	Astoria Walldorf II	84	(39)
2015–2020	Astoria Walldorf	45	(24)
2020–2022	Jahn Regensburg	31	(0)
2022	→ Würzburger Kickers (loan)	6	(2)
2022–2024	Viktoria Köln	61	(18)
2024–2025	Arminia Bielefeld	16	(0)
2025	→ Waldhof Mannheim (loan)	16	(5)
2025–	SSV Ulm	21	(3)
- * Club domestic league appearances and goals as of 30 May 2026

André Becker (born 26 July 1996) is a Brazilian professional footballer who plays as a forward for club SSV Ulm.

== Career ==
Becker made his professional debut for Jahn Regensburg in the 2020–21 DFB-Pokal on 13 September 2020, coming on as a substitute in the 86th minute in the home match against 3. Liga side 1. FC Kaiserslautern.

He was loaned to Würzburger Kickers in January 2022.

On 12 June 2022, Becker signed with Viktoria Köln.

On 18 June 2024, Arminia Bielefeld signed Becker. On 28 January 2025, Becker was loaned by Waldhof Mannheim.

On 23 June 2025, Becker signed a three-year contract with SSV Ulm.
