= Joel Grodowski =

German footballer (born 1997)

Personal information
- Date of birth: 30 November 1997 (age 28)
- Place of birth: Selm, Germany
- Height: 1.85 m (6 ft 1 in)
- Position: Striker

Team information
- Current team: Arminia Bielefeld
- Number: 11

Youth career
- Schalke 04
- Rot Weiss Ahlen

Senior career*
Years	Team	Apps	(Gls)
2015–2017	PSV Bork		
2017–2018	Bradford City	1	(0)
2018–2019	Hammer SpVg	28	(14)
2019–2021	Preußen Münster	47	(9)
2019–2020	Preußen Münster II	11	(2)
2021–2023	SC Verl	47	(7)
2023–2025	Preußen Münster	51	(18)
2025–	Arminia Bielefeld	49	(17)
- * Club domestic league appearances and goals as of 18 May 2026

Joel Grodowski (born 30 November 1997) is a German professional footballer who plays as a striker for 2. Bundesliga club Arminia Bielefeld.

== Career ==
After playing youth football with FC Schalke 04 and Rot Weiss Ahlen, Grodowski began his senior career with PSV Bork in the Kreisliga, scoring 94 goals in two seasons with the club. At PSV Bork his father was the coach and his brother was also a player.

After a potential transfer to Borussia Dortmund was ended due to medical problems, he turned professional with English club Bradford City in July 2017. He made his debut for the club on 19 March 2018, appearing as a substitute in a 2–0 league defeat away at Doncaster Rovers. During his year at Bradford City he suffered from back problems.

He returned to Germany with Hammer SpVg in July 2018. After a season at Hammer SpVg, SC Preußen Münster announced on 27 June 2019 that they had signed Grodowski on a two-year contract. In summer 2021, he joined 3. Liga side SC Verl on a two-year contract.

On 23 June 2023, Grodowski returned to Preußen Münster (which was promoted to 3. Liga).

On 28 January 2025, Grodowski joined Arminia Bielefeld in 3. Liga.

== Career statistics ==
As of 4 August 2021

Appearances and goals by club, season and competition
Club	Season	League			National Cup		League Cup		Other		Total	
Club	Season	Division	Apps	Goals	Apps	Goals	Apps	Goals	Apps	Goals	Apps	Goals
Bradford City	2017–18	League One	1	0	0	0	0	0	0	0	1	0
Hammer SpVg	2018–19	Oberliga Westfalen	28	15	—		—		0	0	28	15
Preußen Münster	2019–20	3. Liga	15	1	—		—		0	0	15	1
Preußen Münster	2020–21	Regionalliga West	32	8	—		—		0	0	32	8
Preußen Münster	Total		47	9	0	0	0	0	0	0	47	9
Preußen Münster II	2019–20	Oberliga Westfalen	11	2	—		—		0	0	11	2
SC Verl	2021–22	3. Liga	0	0	—		—		0	0	0	0
Career total			87	26	0	0	0	0	0	0	87	26

== Honours ==
Arminia Bielefeld

- 3. Liga: 2024–25
