= Noah Sarenren Bazee =

Nigerian-German footballer (born 1996)

Personal information
- Full name: Noah Joel Sarenren Bazee
- Date of birth: 21 August 1996 (age 30)
- Place of birth: Stadthagen, Germany
- Height: 1.83 m (6 ft 0 in)
- Position: Right winger

Team information
- Current team: Waldhof Mannheim
- Number: 37

Youth career
- 2005–2007: SSV Südwinsen
- 2007–2009: TuS Celle FC
- 2009–2011: JFC Allertal
- 2011–2013: TSV Havelse
- 2013–2015: Hannover 96

Senior career*
Years	Team	Apps	(Gls)
2015–2019	Hannover 96 II	19	(7)
2016–2019	Hannover 96	28	(1)
2019–2023	FC Augsburg II	7	(3)
2019–2023	FC Augsburg	31	(2)
2023–2026	Arminia Bielefeld	58	(11)
2026–	Waldhof Mannheim	0	(0)
- * Club domestic league appearances and goals as of 18 May 2026

Noah Joel Sarenren Bazee (born 21 August 1996) is a German professional footballer who plays as a right winger for 3. Liga club Waldhof Mannheim.

== Club career ==
Sarenren Bazee grew up in Walle near Celle, where he played for several clubs. In 2011, he moved to the Hanover region for TSV Havelse. In 2013, he moved to Hannover 96. He played in the Under 19 Bundesliga and the Regionalliga Nord before making his debut on 8 April 2016 against Hertha BSC both in the squad, and together with Waldemar Anton also in the starting lineup.

On 18 June 2019, FC Augsburg announced that they had signed Bazee for the upcoming season. He penned a five-year contract.

On 24 May 2020, Bazee came on as a substitute against Schalke 04 in the 59th minute and scored his first goal for Augsburg, in a 3–0 victory.

On 31 August 2023, Sarenren Bazee signed with 3. Liga club Arminia Bielefeld. Scoring the only goal in the final game of the season, Bazee helped Bielefeld clinch the 3.Liga title.

On 18 May 2026, Sarenren Bazee moved to Waldhof Mannheim.

== International career ==
Sarenren Bazee is eligible to represent Nigeria through his father and Germany through his mother. He has been approached by the coach of the Nigerian team, Gernot Rohr, to switch his allegiance to Nigeria. He was named to the Nigeria squad for the March 2017 friendlies against Senegal and Burkina Faso.

== Honours ==
Arminia Bielefeld

- 3. Liga: 2024–25
