= Nassim Boujellab =

Footballer (born 1999)

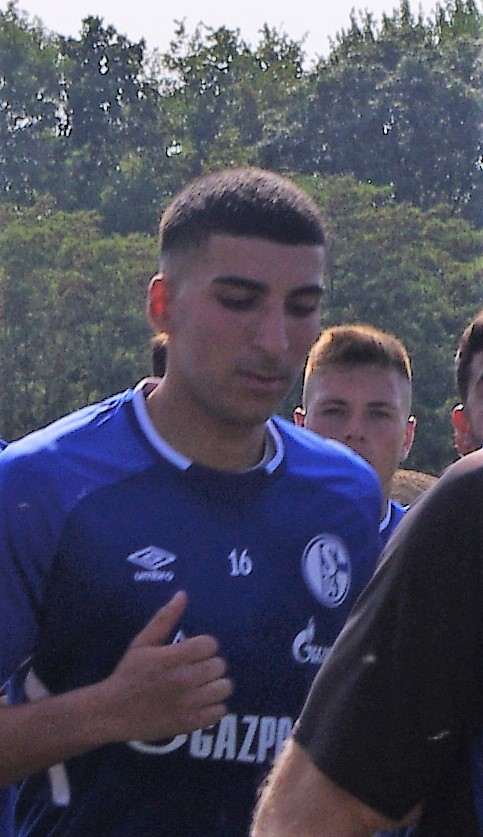
- Boujellab with Schalke 04 in 2019

Personal information
- Date of birth: 20 June 1999 (age 27)
- Place of birth: Hohenlimburg, Germany
- Height: 1.81 m (5 ft 11 in)
- Position: Midfielder

Team information
- Current team: Jahn Regensburg
- Number: 10

Youth career
- 2004–2007: ASSV Letmathe 98
- 2007–2014: FC Iserlohn
- 2014–2018: Schalke 04

Senior career*
Years	Team	Apps	(Gls)
2018–2020	Schalke 04 II	31	(19)
2019–2023	Schalke 04	30	(1)
2021–2022	→ FC Ingolstadt (loan)	8	(0)
2022	→ HJK (loan)	20	(1)
2023–2025	Arminia Bielefeld	36	(1)
2025–2026	TSV Havelse	32	(7)
2026–	Jahn Regensburg	7	(2)

International career^{‡}
2018	Morocco U23	2	(0)
2020	Morocco	3	(0)
- * Club domestic league appearances and goals as of 14:33, 26 September 2026 (UTC) ‡ National team caps and goals as of 17 November 2020

Nassim Boujellab (Arabic: نسيم بوجلاب; born 20 June 1999) is a professional footballer who plays as a midfielder for Jahn Regensburg. Born in Germany, Boujellab represents the Morocco national team.

== Club career ==
=== Schalke 04 ===
Boujellab made his professional debut for Schalke 04 in the Bundesliga on 31 March 2019, coming on as a substitute in the 79th minute for Suat Serdar in the 1–0 away win against Hannover 96.

==== FC Ingolstadt (loan) ====
On 25 July 2021, he joined 2. Bundesliga club FC Ingolstadt on a one-year loan deal. On 23 January 2022, his loan contract with Ingolstadt was terminated with immediate effect because, according to the club, he "repeatedly violated internal club and team rules and regulations".

==== HJK (loan) ====
On 1 March 2022, Boujellab joined HJK in Finland on loan. He became temporarily ineligible to play for HJK early in July 2022, as HJK originally acquired him on a "sub-loan" from FC Ingolstadt, who earlier loaned him from Schalke until 30 June 2022. When that date was reached, his rights automatically reverted to Schalke and Schalke could only transfer him back on loan to HJK when the international transfer window re-opened on 13 July.

=== Arminia Bielefeld ===
On 28 June 2023, Boujellab joined Arminia Bielefeld, newly relegated from the 2. Bundesliga.

=== TSV Havelse ===
Boujellab joined TSV Havelse ahead of the 2025–26 season on a one-year contract after his contract with Bielefeld expired.

=== Jahn Regensburg ===
After only one season with Havelse, Boujellab joined Jahn Regensburg on a two-year contract.

== International career ==
Boujellab was born in Germany, and is Moroccan by descent holding dual citizenship. Boujellab was called up to the Morocco under-23 national team for the first time in September 2018. He made his under-23 debut in October 2018, making two appearances in friendly matches against Algeria. He represented the senior Morocco national team in a friendly 3–1 win over Senegal on 9 October 2020.

== Career statistics ==
=== Club ===
As of 26 September 2026

Appearances and goals by club, season and competition
Club	Season	League			Cup		Europe		Other		Total	
Club	Season	Division	Apps	Goals	Apps	Goals	Apps	Goals	Apps	Goals	Apps	Goals
Schalke 04 II	2018–19	Oberliga Westfalen	20	14	—		—		—		20	14
Schalke 04 II	2019–20	Regionalliga West	8	3	—		—		—		8	3
Schalke 04 II	2020–21	Regionalliga West	3	2	—		—		—		3	2
Schalke 04 II	Total		31	19	—		—		—		31	19
Schalke 04	2018–19	Bundesliga	7	0	1	0	0	0	—		8	0
Schalke 04	2019–20	Bundesliga	11	0	2	0	—		—		13	0
Schalke 04	2020–21	Bundesliga	12	1	1	0	—		—		13	1
Schalke 04	2022–23	Bundesliga	0	0	—		—		—		0	0
Schalke 04	Total		30	1	4	0	0	0	—		34	1
FC Ingolstadt (loan)	2021–22	2. Bundesliga	8	0	0	0	—		—		8	0
HJK (loan)	2022	Veikkausliiga	20	1	3	0	9	0	—		32	1
Arminia Bielefeld	2023–24	3. Liga	29	1	2	0	—		3 (Note: Appearances in the Westphalian Cup.)	1	34	2
Arminia Bielefeld	2024–25	3. Liga	7	0	1	0	—		1	2	9	2
Arminia Bielefeld	Total		36	1	3	0	—		4	3	43	4
TSV Havelse	2025–26	3. Liga	32	7	0	0	—		—		32	7
Jahn Regensburg	2026–27	3. Liga	7	2	—		—		—		7	2
Career total			164	31	10	0	9	0	4	3	187	37

=== International ===
As of match played on 17 November 2020

Appearances and goals by national team and year
National team	Year	Apps	Goals
Morocco	2020	3	0
Total		3	0

== Honours ==
HJK

- Veikkausliiga: 2022

Arminia Bielefeld

- 3. Liga: 2024–25
- Westphalian Cup: 2023–24, 2024–25
