= Stefano Russo (footballer, born 2000) =

German footballer

Personal information
- Date of birth: 29 June 2000 (age 26)
- Place of birth: Ludwigshafen, Germany
- Height: 1.83 m (6 ft 0 in)
- Position: Defensive midfielder

Team information
- Current team: Arminia Bielefeld
- Number: 21

Youth career
- –2012: VfR Friesenheim
- 2012–2018: 1899 Hoffenheim
- 2018–2019: FC Augsburg

Senior career*
Years	Team	Apps	(Gls)
2019–2020	FC Augsburg II	14	(0)
2020–2023	Waldhof Mannheim	48	(2)
2023–2024	Viktoria Köln	33	(2)
2024–	Arminia Bielefeld	64	(4)

International career^{‡}
2015	Germany U15	2	(0)
2015	Germany U16	3	(0)
- * Club domestic league appearances and goals as of 18 May 2026 ‡ National team caps and goals as of 13:36, 24 April 2021 (UTC)

Stefano Russo (born 29 June 2000) is a German professional footballer who plays as a defensive midfielder for 2. Bundesliga club Arminia Bielefeld.

== Career ==
Russo made his professional debut for Waldhof Mannheim in the 3. Liga on 21 April 2021, coming on as a substitute in the 73rd minute for Dominik Martinović against 1. FC Saarbrücken. The away match finished as a 5–0 loss for Mannheim.

He signed with Arminia Bielefeld in May 2024 for the upcoming 2024–25 season.

== Career statistics ==
=== Club ===
As of match played 24 May 2025

Appearances and goals by club, season and competition
Club	Season	League			DFB Pokal		Other		Total	
Club	Season	Division	Apps	Goals	Apps	Goals	Apps	Goals	Apps	Goals
FC Augsburg	2018-19	Bundesliga	0	0	0	0	—		0	0
FC Augsburg	2019-20	Bundesliga	0	0	0	0	—		0	0
FC Augsburg	Total		0	0	0	0	—		0	0
FC Augsburg II	2019-20	Regionalliga Bayern	14	0	—		—		14	0
Waldhof Mannheim	2020-21	3. Liga	5	1	0	0	—		5	1
Waldhof Mannheim	2021-22	3. Liga	25	0	2	0	—		27	0
Waldhof Mannheim	2022-23	3. Liga	19	1	1	0	—		20	1
Waldhof Mannheim	Total		49	2	3	0	—		52	2
Viktoria Köln	2023-24	3. Liga	33	2	2	0	—		35	2
Arminia Bielefeld	2024-25	3. Liga	37	2	5	0	—		42	2
Career total			133	6	10	0	—		143	6

== Honours ==
Arminia Bielefeld

- 3. Liga: 2024–25
- DFB-Pokal
  - Runners-up: 2024–25
- Westphalian Cup: 2024–25
