= Marius Wörl =

German footballer (born 2004)

Personal information
- Date of birth: 5 April 2004 (age 22)
- Place of birth: Gosseltshausen, Germany
- Height: 1.78 m (5 ft 10 in)
- Position: Midfielder

Team information
- Current team: Arminia Bielefeld
- Number: 38

Youth career
- –2018: Bayern Munich
- 2018–2023: 1860 Munich

Senior career*
Years	Team	Apps	(Gls)
2021–2023	1860 Munich II	2	(0)
2022–2023	1860 Munich	18	(0)
2023–2025	Hannover 96	0	(0)
2023–2025	→ Arminia Bielefeld (loan)	67	(8)
2025	Hannover 96 II	2	(0)
2025–	Arminia Bielefeld	30	(2)

International career^{‡}
2022	Germany U19	2	(0)
2023–2025	Germany U20	4	(1)
- * Club domestic league appearances and goals as of 18 May 2026 ‡ National team caps and goals as of 24 March 2025

Marius Wörl (born 5 April 2004) is a German professional footballer who plays as a midfielder for 2. Bundesliga club Arminia Bielefeld.

== Club career ==
After his beginnings at TSV Rohrbach, Wörl moved to the youth team of Bayern Munich at an early age. In 2018, he transferred to the youth department of 1860 Munich. For the club, he played five games in the Under 17 Bundesliga and four games in the Under 19 Bundesliga. He made his first professional appearance in the 3. Liga when he was substituted for Daniel Wein in the 80th minute of the match in a 3–1 home win against Erzgebirge Aue on 16 September 2022. Under the new coach of 1860 Munich, Maurizio Jacobacci, he played regularly in the second half of the season.

On 1 June 2023 Wörl signed a three-year contract with Hannover 96, starting in the 2023–24 season.

On 28 August 2023, Wörl was loaned by Arminia Bielefeld in the 3. Liga. Bielefeld made use of their option to purchase Wörl permanently, prompting Hannover 96 to make use of their option to purchase him back, leading to his return to Hannover ahead of the 2025–26 season and extending his contract until 2027. Later that summer, Bielefeld signed Wörl permanently.

== International career ==
On 23 November 2022, Wörl made his debut for the German under-19 national team in a 3–0 win against Poland.

== Honours ==
Arminia Bielefeld

- 3. Liga: 2024–25
- Westphalian Cup: 2024–25
