= Christopher Lannert =

German footballer (born 1998)

Personal information
- Date of birth: 8 June 1998 (age 28)
- Place of birth: Munich, Germany
- Height: 1.80 m (5 ft 11 in)
- Position: Right-back

Team information
- Current team: Darmstadt 98
- Number: 28

Youth career
- 1860 Munich
- –2012: Bayern Munich
- 2012–2017: Augsburg

Senior career*
Years	Team	Apps	(Gls)
2017–2020	Augsburg II	84	(6)
2020–2022	SC Verl	65	(1)
2022–2023	1860 Munich	29	(0)
2023–2026	Arminia Bielefeld	101	(1)
2026–	Darmstadt 98	6	(0)
- * Club domestic league appearances and goals as of 18 September 2026

Christopher Lannert (born 8 June 1998) is a German professional footballer who plays as a right-back for 2. Bundesliga club Darmstadt 98.

== Career ==
Lannert was born in Munich on 8 June 1998. After playing youth football for 1860 Munich, Bayern Munich and Augsburg and senior football for Augsburg II, Lannert signed a two-year contract SC Verl on a free transfer in October 2020, with Lannert having been released by Augsburg II at the end of the previous season. He played the most minutes of any player in the 2021–22 3. Liga.

He returned to 1860 Munich in summer 2022, before transferring to Arminia Bielefeld for an undisclosed fee the following summer. He was part of the team that won the 2024–25 3. Liga.

On 17 July 2026, Lannert joined Darmstadt 98.

== Honours ==
Arminia Bielefeld

- 3. Liga: 2024–25
