= 2023–24 Dynamo Dresden season =

Dynamo Dresden
2023–24 season
- President: Holger Scholze
- Head coach: Markus Anfang
- Stadium: Rudolf-Harbig-Stadion
- 3. Liga: 4th
- Saxony Cup: Winners
- Top goalscorer: League: Stefan Kutschke (14); All: Stefan Kutschke (15)
- Highest home attendance: 31,834 vs Erzgebirge Aue (24 September 2023)
- Lowest home attendance: 26,747 vs Waldhof Mannheim (22 August 2023)
- Average home league attendance: 29,109
- Biggest win: 8–0 vs Eintracht Niesky (A) (31 October 2023); Saxony Cup
- Biggest defeat: 1–3 vs Rot-Weiss Essen (A) (1 October 2023); 3. Liga

The 2023–24 season was the 71st season in the history of Dynamo Dresden and their second consecutive season in the third division. The club participated in the 3. Liga and Saxony Cup.

== Players ==
=== First-team squad ===
As of 20 September 2023

Note: Flags indicate national team as defined under FIFA eligibility rules; some limited exceptions apply. Players may hold more than one non-FIFA nationality.

No.	Pos.	Nation	Player
1	GK	GER	Stefan Drljača
2	DF	KOR	Park Kyu-hyun
6	MF	GER	Tom Berger
7	FW	GRE	Panagiotis Vlachodimos
8	DF	GER	Jonathan Meier
9	FW	GER	Manuel Schäffler
10	FW	GER	Jakob Lemmer
11	FW	GER	Lucas Cueto
14	DF	GER	Paul Lehmann
15	DF	SRI	Claudio Kammerknecht
17	DF	UKR	Kyrylo Melichenko
18	DF	KOR	Seo Jong-min
19	MF	GER	Luca Herrmann
22	MF	GER	Tom Zimmerschied
23	DF	GER	Lars Bünning

No.	Pos.	Nation	Player
24	FW	GER	Tony Menzel
25	MF	GER	Jonas Oehmichen
27	MF	GER	Niklas Hauptmann
28	MF	GER	Paul Will
29	FW	GER	Dennis Borkowski (on loan from RB Leipzig)
30	FW	GER	Stefan Kutschke (captain)
31	DF	GER	Jakob Lewald
33	DF	GER	Tobias Kraulich
35	GK	GER	Kevin Broll
36	FW	GER	Robin Meißner
39	DF	GER	Kevin Ehlers
40	GK	GER	Erik Herrmann
—	FW	UKR	Dmytro Bohdanov
—	FW	BLR	Jan Shcherbakovski

=== Out on loan ===
Note: Flags indicate national team as defined under FIFA eligibility rules; some limited exceptions apply. Players may hold more than one non-FIFA nationality.

No.	Pos.	Nation	Player
—	MF	GER	Oliver Batista Meier (at SC Verl until 30 June 2024)

== Transfers ==
=== Transfers in ===
Position	Name	From	Type/fee	Length	Date	Ref.
DF	(South Korea) Park Kyu-hyun (Note: Permanent signing following a loan last season.)	(Germany) Werder Bremen	Free	3 years	2 June 2023	
MF	(Germany) Tom Zimmerschied	(Germany) Hallescher FC	Free	2 years	6 June 2023	
DF	(Germany) Tobias Kraulich	(Germany) SV Meppen	Free	1 year	16 June 2023	
FW	(Germany) Lucas Cueto	(Germany) Karlsruher SC	Free	1 year	22 June 2023	
FW	(Germany) Robin Meißner	(Germany) Hamburger SV	Undisclosed	2 years	4 July 2023	
DF	(Germany) Lars Bünning	(Germany) 1. FC Kaiserslautern	Undisclosed	2 years	16 August 2023	
MF	(Germany) Tom Berger	(Germany) SV Werder Bremen II	Free	2 years	17 August 2023	

==== From youth squad ====
Position	Name	Age	Length	Date	Ref.
FW	(Ukraine) Dmytro Bohdanov	16		20 September 2023	

=== Transfers out ===
Position	Name	To	Type/fee	Date	Ref.
GK	(Germany) Sven Müller	(Germany) Hallescher FC	Mutual termination	19 June 2023	
DF	(Germany) Phil Harres	(Germany) FC 08 Homburg	Undisclosed	24 June 2023	
DF	(Germany) Tim Knipping	(Germany) SV Sandhausen	End of contract	30 June 2023	
MF	(Germany) Patrick Weihrauch	(Germany) FC 08 Homburg	End of contract	30 June 2023	
DF	(Germany) Robin Becker	Unattached	End of contract	30 June 2023	
MF	(Germany) Michael Akoto	(Denmark) AGF	End of contract	30 June 2023	
MF	(Germany) Max Kulke	Unattached	End of contract	30 June 2023	
FW	(Georgia (country)) Akaki Gogia	(Germany) VSG Altglienicke	Mutual termination	31 July 2023	
MF	(Germany) Julius Kade	(Germany) Wehen Wiesbaden	Undisclosed	10 August 2023	

=== Contract extensions ===
Position	Name	Length	Date	Ref.
FW	(Germany) Tony Menzel	5 years	1 August 2023	
MF	(Germany) Niklas Hauptmann	4.5 years	13 December 2023	

=== Loans in ===
Position	Name	From	Start date	End date	Ref.
FW	(Germany) Dennis Borkowski (Note: Loan extension following a loan last season.)	(Germany) RB Leipzig	27 June 2023	End of season	

=== Loans out ===
Position	Name	To	Start date	End date	Ref.
FW	(Germany) Julius Hoffmann	(Germany) SV Babelsberg	15 June 2023	End of season	
FW	(Germany) Jonas Saliger	(Germany) 1. FC Köln II	26 June 2023	End of season	

== Pre-season and friendlies ==
Win Draw Loss Fixtures

25 June 2023 Friendly	Königswarthaer SV (Germany)	0–14	Dynamo Dresden	Königswartha
15:30 CEST		Report	Lemmer 14', 34'; Lehmann 22'; Zimmerschied 30'; Vlachodimos 39'; Schäffler 41', 46', 71', 86'; Herrmann 51'; Menzel 52'; Oehmichen 57', 67', 80'	Stadium: Sportanlage Königswartha; Attendance: 2,650

1 July 2023 Friendly	FSV Budissa Bautzen (Germany)	0–6	Dynamo Dresden	Bautzen
16:00 CEST		Report	Kutschke 45'; Menzel 49'; 56' (o.g.); Vlachodimos 66'; Schäffler 82', 84'	Stadium: Stadion Müllerwiese; Attendance: 2,700

8 July 2023 Friendly	SKN St. Pölten (Austria)	1–5	Dynamo Dresden	Thiersee
16:00 CEST	Schütz 40'	Report	Kutschke 8', 25'; Menzel 58'; Herrmann 60'; Lewald 68'	Stadium: Pendlingstadion

13 July 2023 Friendly	Dynamo Dresden	2–0	(Germany) SC Paderborn	Walchsee
16:00 CEST	Borkowski 23'; Herrmann 118'	Report		Stadium: Ramsbachstadion Walchsee; Attendance: 400
Note: The match was 120 minutes long.

16 July 2023 Friendly	Slavia Prague (Czech Republic)	1–1	Dynamo Dresden	Prague
14:00 CEST	Schranz 89'	Report	Schäffler 88'	Stadium: Fortuna Arena; Attendance: 16,800

22 July 2023 Friendly	FSV Zwickau (Germany)	0–3	Dynamo Dresden	Zwickau
15:00 CEST		Report	Hauptmann 30'; Kutschke 32'; Schäffler 47'	Stadium: Stadion Zwickau; Attendance: 5,979

== Competitions ==
=== Overall record ===
Competition	First match	Last match	Starting round	Record							
Competition	First match	Last match	Starting round	Pld	W	D	L	GF	GA	GD	Win %
3. Liga	5 August 2023	18 May 2024	Matchday 1	24	15	1	8	37	22	+15	62.50
Saxony Cup	31 October 2023		Third round	2	2	0	0	12	0	+12	100.00
Total				26	17	1	8	49	22	+27	65.38

Last updated: 4 February 2024
Source: Soccerway

=== 3. Liga ===
==== League table ====
Pos	Team	Pld	W	D	L	GF	GA	GD	Pts	Promotion, qualification or relegation
2	Preußen Münster (P)	38	19	10	9	68	49	+19	67	Promotion to 2. Bundesliga and qualification for DFB-Pokal
3	Jahn Regensburg (O, P)	38	17	12	9	51	42	+9	63	Qualification for promotion play-offs and DFB-Pokal
4	Dynamo Dresden	38	19	5	14	58	40	+18	62	Qualification for DFB-Pokal
5	1. FC Saarbrücken	38	15	15	8	60	43	+17	60	
6	Erzgebirge Aue	38	16	12	10	51	47	+4	60	

Source: DFB
Rules for classification: 1) Points; 2) Goal difference; 3) Goals scored; 4) Head-to-head results; 5) Head-to-head away goals scored; 6) Away goals scored; 7) Play-off.
(O) Play-off winners; (P) Promoted

==== Results summary ====
Overall								Home						Away					
Pld	W	D	L	GF	GA	GD	Pts	W	D	L	GF	GA	GD	W	D	L	GF	GA	GD
37	18	5	14	54	40	+14	59	10	2	6	29	20	+9	8	3	8	25	20	+5

Last updated: 13 May 2024.
Source: Soccerway

==== Results by round ====
Round	1	2	3	4	5	6	7	8	9	10	11	12	14	15	13	16	17	18	19	20	21	22	23	24	25	26	27	28	29	30	31	32	33	34	35	36	37	38
Ground	H	A	H	A	H	A	H	A	H	A	A	H	A	H	A	H	A	H	A	A	H	A	H	A	H	A	H	A	H	H	A	H	A	H	A	H	A	H
Result	W	L	W	W	W	W	W	L	W	D	W	W	W	W	L	L	L	W	W	W	L	W	L	L	W	L	D	L	W	D	L	L	D	L	D	L	W	
Position	2	10	4	1	1	1	1	1	1	1	1	1	1	1	1	2	2	2	2	2	2	1	2	2	2	2	2	3	3	2	4	4	3	4	5	5	4	
Points	3	3	6	9	12	15	18	18	21	22	25	28	31	34	34	34	34	37	40	43	43	46	46	46	49	49	50	50	53	54	54	54	55	55	56	56	59	

Updated to match(es) played on 13 May 2024. Source: Soccerway
A = Away; H = Home; W = Win; D = Draw; L = Loss

==== Matches ====
Win Draw Loss Fixtures

5 August 2023 1	Dynamo Dresden	3–1	Arminia Bielefeld	Dresden
16:15 CEST	Belkahia 14' (o.g.); Kutschke 36' (pen.); Hauptmann 65'	Report	Biankadi 45'	Stadium: Rudolf-Harbig-Stadion; Attendance: 29,589; Referee: Wolfgang Haslberger

18 August 2023 2	SV Sandhausen	1–0	Dynamo Dresden	Sandhausen
19:00 CEST	El-Zein 18'	Report		Stadium: GP Stadion am Hardtwald; Attendance: 10,000; Referee: Matthias Jöllenbeck

22 August 2023 3	Dynamo Dresden	2–1	Waldhof Mannheim	Dresden
19:00 CEST	Kutschke 23'; Hauptmann 29'	Report	Sohm 84'	Stadium: Rudolf-Harbig-Stadion; Attendance: 26,747; Referee: Arne Aarnink

26 August 2023 4	Borussia Dortmund II	0–2	Dynamo Dresden	Dortmund
14:00 CEST		Report	Kutschke 6'; Borkowski 77' (pen.)	Stadium: Stadion Rote Erde; Attendance: 3,873; Referee: Florian Heft

2 September 2023 5	Dynamo Dresden	2–0	FC Ingolstadt	Dresden
14:00 CEST	Vlachodimos 62'; Schäffler 90'	Report		Stadium: Rudolf-Harbig-Stadion; Attendance: 28,129; Referee: Konrad Oldhafer

16 September 2023 6	VfB Lübeck	0–1	Dynamo Dresden	Lübeck
14:00 CEST		Report	Lemmer 51'	Stadium: Stadion Lohmühle; Attendance: 8,858; Referee: Frank Willenborg

24 September 2023 7	Dynamo Dresden	2–1	Erzgebirge Aue	Dresden
19:30 CEST	Vukancic 9' (o.g.); Borkowski 84'	Report	Bär 90+4'	Stadium: Rudolf-Harbig-Stadion; Attendance: 31,834; Referee: Harm Osmers

1 October 2023 8	Rot-Weiss Essen	3–1	Dynamo Dresden	Essen
13:30 CEST	Götze 25'; Bastians 80'; Doumbouya 89'	Report	Vlachodimos 90+7'	Stadium: Stadion an der Hafenstraße; Attendance: 18,657; Referee: Tobias Reichel

4 October 2023 9	Dynamo Dresden	2–1	Hallescher FC	Dresden
19:00 CEST	Borkowski 45+1'; Zimmerschied 51'	Report	Baumann 7'	Stadium: Rudolf-Harbig-Stadion; Attendance: 29,159; Referee: Patrick Kessel

7 October 2023 10	1860 Munich	0–0	Dynamo Dresden	Munich
14:00 CEST		Report		Stadium: Grünwalder Stadion; Attendance: 15,000; Referee: Robert Hartmann

15 October 2023 11	SSV Ulm	2–3	Dynamo Dresden	Ulm
13:30 CEST	Yarbrough 28'; Röser 45'	Report	Kutschke 33'; Kammerknecht 36', 57'	Stadium: Donaustadion; Attendance: 17,000; Referee: Lukas Benen

21 October 2023 12	Dynamo Dresden	1–0	Preußen Münster	Dresden
14:00 CEST	Schäffler 11'	Report		Stadium: Rudolf-Harbig-Stadion; Attendance: 28,729; Referee: Max Burda

4 November 2023 14	Dynamo Dresden	2–0	SC Freiburg II	Dresden
14:00 CET	Herrmann 3'; Meißner 86'	Report		Stadium: Rudolf-Harbig-Stadion; Referee: Nico Fuchs

10 November 2023 15	Viktoria Köln	1–5	Dynamo Dresden	Cologne
19:00 CET	Bogicevic 55'	Report	Kutschke 17' (pen.), 45+4' (pen.), 86'; Hauptmann 32'; Meißner 83'	Stadium: Sportpark Höhenberg; Attendance: 5,000; Referee: Florian Exner

19 November 2023 13	1. FC Saarbrücken	1–0	Dynamo Dresden	Saarbrücken
13:30 CET	Brünker 40'	Report		Stadium: Ludwigsparkstadion; Attendance: 14,352; Referee: Max Burda
Note: Originally played on 29 October, the match was abandoned at half-time due to weather conditions.

26 November 2023 16	Dynamo Dresden	0–1	Jahn Regensburg	Dresden
16:30 CET		Report	Ballas 90+3'	Stadium: Rudolf-Harbig-Stadion; Attendance: 29,578; Referee: Patrick Alt

3 December 2023 17	SC Verl	1–0	Dynamo Dresden	Verl
13:30 CET	Benger 68'	Report		Stadium: Sportclub Arena; Attendance: 4,217; Referee: Nicolas Winter

10 December 2023 18	Dynamo Dresden	2–1	SpVgg Unterhaching	Dresden
16:30 CET	Lemmer 32'; Kutschke 74' (pen.)	Report	Hobsch 42' (pen.)	Stadium: Rudolf-Harbig-Stadion; Attendance: 25,272; Referee: Timo Gerach

17 December 2023 19	MSV Duisburg	2–4	Dynamo Dresden	Duisburg
13:30 CET	Pusch 45+2'; Müller 87'	Report	Will 5'; Kutschke 54'; Zimmerschied 56'; Meißner 83'	Stadium: Schauinsland-Reisen-Arena; Attendance: 12,078; Referee: Sören Storks

20 December 2023 20	Arminia Bielefeld	0–1	Dynamo Dresden	Bielefeld
19:00 CET		Report	Hauptmann 78'	Stadium: Schüco-Arena; Attendance: 20,000; Referee: Patrick Kessel

20 January 2024 21	Dynamo Dresden	0–1	SV Sandhausen	Dresden
14:00 CET		Report	Pink 45+1'	Stadium: Rudolf-Harbig-Stadion; Attendance: 25,350; Referee: Tobias Reichel

23 January 2024 22	Waldhof Mannheim	0–2	Dynamo Dresden	Mannheim
19:00 CET		Report	Zimmerschied 45'; Cueto 61'	Stadium: Carl-Benz-Stadion; Attendance: 12,514; Referee: Michael Bacher

28 January 2024 23	Dynamo Dresden	1–2	Borussia Dortmund II	Dresden
19:30 CET	Lemmer 65'	Report	Elongo-Yombo 23'; Bamba 86'	Stadium: Rudolf-Harbig-Stadion; Attendance: 22,448; Referee: Florian Lechner

4 February 2024 24	FC Ingolstadt	2–1	Dynamo Dresden	Ingolstadt
13:30 CET	Mause 6'; Grønning 45'	Report	Meißner 82'	Stadium: Audi Sportpark; Attendance: 9,072; Referee: Robert Kampka

10 February 2024 25	Dynamo Dresden	7–2	VfB Lübeck	Dresden
14:00 CET	Hauptmann 10' 60'; Herrmann 14'; Lemmer 28' 90+2'; Kutschke 38'; Grupe 82' (o.g.)	Report	Hauptmann 32'; Herzog 62' (pen.)	Stadium: Rudolf-Harbig-Stadion; Attendance: 26,377; Referee: Wolfgang Haslberger

18 February 2024 26	Erzgebirge Aue	2–1	Dynamo Dresden	Aue-Bad Schlema
16:30 CET	Bär 36'; Danhof 77'	Report	Meißner 81'	Stadium: Erzgebirgsstadion; Attendance: 15,500; Referee: Timo Gerach

24 February 2024 27	Dynamo Dresden	2–2	Rot-Weiss Essen	Dresden
14:00 CET	Zimmerschied 11' 47'	Report	Harenbrock 7'; Eisfeld 34'	Stadium: Rudolf-Harbig-Stadion; Attendance: 30,387; Referee: Lukas Benen

2 March 2024 28	Hallescher FC	1–0	Dynamo Dresden	Halle
14:00 CET	Baumann 83'	Report		Stadium: Leuna Chemie Stadion; Attendance: 13,114; Referee: Florian Exner

8 March 2024 29	Dynamo Dresden	2–1	1860 Munich	Dresden
19:00 CET	Kutschke 8'; Cueto 76'	Report	Nankishi 41'	Stadium: Rudolf-Harbig-Stadion; Attendance: 31,048; Referee: Max Burda

16 March 2024 30	Dynamo Dresden	0–0	SSV Ulm	Dresden
14:00 CET		Report		Stadium: Rudolf-Harbig-Stadion; Attendance: 30,443; Referee: Patrick Ittrich

30 March 2024 31	Preußen Münster	1–0	Dynamo Dresden	Münster
14:00 CET	Batmaz 52'	Report		Stadium: Preußenstadion; Attendance: 11,744; Referee: Patrick Schwengers

7 April 2024 32	Dynamo Dresden	1–3	1. FC Saarbrücken	Dresden
13:30 CET	Schäffler 67'	Report	Civeja 30'; Stehle 51' 60'	Stadium: Rudolf-Harbig-Stadion; Attendance: 30,840; Referee: Robin Braun

14 April 2024 33	SC Freiburg II	1–1	Dynamo Dresden	Freiburg im Breisgau
19:30 CET	Sturm 60'	Report	Zimmerschied 28'	Stadium: Dreisamstadion; Attendance: 3,870; Referee: Riem Hussein

20 April 2024 34	Dynamo Dresden	0–2	Viktoria Köln	Dresden
14:00 CET		Report	Handle 67'; Becker 80'	Stadium: Rudolf-Harbig-Stadion; Attendance: 30,000; Referee: Max Burda

27 April 2024 35	Jahn Regensburg	1–1	Dynamo Dresden	Regensburg
14:00 CET	Viet 89' (pen.)	Report	Kutschke 54'	Stadium: Jahnstadion Regensburg; Attendance: 15210; Referee: Matthias Jöllenbeck

4 May 2024 36	Dynamo Dresden	0–1	SC Verl	Dresden
14:00 CET		Report	Lokotsch 21'	Stadium: Rudolf-Harbig-Stadion; Attendance: 28325; Referee: Marc Philip Eckermann

11 May 2024 37	SpVgg Unterhaching	1–2	Dynamo Dresden	Unterhaching
14:00 CET	Keller 83'	Report	Hauptmann 4'; Kutschke 26'	Stadium: Alpenbauer Sportpark; Attendance: 9415; Referee: Patrick Kessel

18 May 2024 38	Dynamo Dresden	v	MSV Duisburg	Dresden
13:30 CET		Report		Stadium: Rudolf-Harbig-Stadion

=== Saxony Cup ===
Win Draw Loss Fixtures

31 October 2023 Third round	Eintracht Niesky	0–8	Dynamo Dresden	Niesky
13:00 CET		Report	Schäffler 8'; Meißner 30', 40'; Borkowski 34', 70', 84'; Seo 62'; Lemmer 71'	Stadium: Niesky Rasenplatz

22 November 2023 Round of 16	Empor Glauchau	0–4	Dynamo Dresden	Glauchau
13:00 CET		Report	Berger 29'; Schäffler 41', 73'; Borkowski 69'	Stadium: Sportpark Meeraner; Attendance: 4,000
Note: Originally scheduled for 19 November 2023, the match was postponed due to the rescheduling of the round 13 match against 1. FC Saarbrücken.

23 March 2024 Quarter-finals	VFC Plauen	v	Dynamo Dresden	Plauen
		Report		Stadium: Vogtland Stadium
