= 2022–23 Dynamo Dresden season =

Dynamo Dresden
2022–23 season
- President: Holger Scholze
- Head coach: Markus Anfang
- Stadium: Rudolf-Harbig-Stadion
- 3. Liga: 6th
- DFB-Pokal: First round
- Saxony Cup: Quarter-finals
- Top goalscorer: League: Ahmet Arslan (25); All: Ahmet Arslan (31)
- Biggest win: Frisch Auf Wurzen 0–11 Dynamo Dresden
Home colours	Away colours	Third colours

The 2022–23 season was the 70th in the history of Dynamo Dresden and their first season back in the third division since 2021. The club participated in the 3. Liga and DFB-Pokal.

== Players ==
As of 31 January 2023

Note: Flags indicate national team as defined under FIFA eligibility rules; some limited exceptions apply. Players may hold more than one non-FIFA nationality.

No.	Pos.	Nation	Player
1	GK	GER	Sven Müller
2	DF	KOR	Park Kyu-hyun (on loan from Werder Bremen)
3	MF	GEO	Akaki Gogia
4	DF	GER	Tim Knipping (captain)
6	MF	GER	Ahmet Arslan (on loan from Holstein Kiel)
7	FW	GRE	Panagiotis Vlachodimos
8	DF	GER	Jonathan Meier
9	FW	GER	Dennis Borkowski (on loan from RB Leipzig)
10	MF	GER	Patrick Weihrauch
14	DF	GER	Paul Lehmann
15	DF	GER	Claudio Kammerknecht
16	DF	GER	Robin Becker
17	DF	UKR	Kyrylo Melichenko
18	DF	KOR	Seo Jong-min
19	MF	GER	Luca Herrmann
20	MF	GER	Julius Kade

No.	Pos.	Nation	Player
21	FW	GER	Jakob Lemmer
22	MF	GER	Michael Akoto
23	GK	GER	Stefan Drljača
25	MF	GER	Jonas Oehmichen
27	MF	GER	Niklas Hauptmann
28	MF	GER	Paul Will
29	FW	GER	Jonas Saliger
30	FW	GER	Stefan Kutschke
31	DF	GER	Jakob Lewald
32	FW	GER	Christian Conteh (on loan from Feyenoord)
33	FW	GER	Manuel Schäffler
35	GK	GER	Kevin Broll
36	MF	GER	Max Kulke
38	FW	GER	Julius Hoffmann
39	DF	GER	Kevin Ehlers

=== Out on loan ===
Note: Flags indicate national team as defined under FIFA eligibility rules; some limited exceptions apply. Players may hold more than one non-FIFA nationality.

No. / Pos. / Nation / Player; — / MF / GER / Oliver Batista Meier (at SC Verl until 30 June 2024)	No. / Pos. / Nation / Player; — / FW / BLR / Jan Shcherbakovski (at Energie Cottbus until 30 June 2023)

== Pre-season and friendlies ==
Win Draw Loss Fixtures

24 June 2022 Friendly	VfB Auerbach (Germany)	1–3	(Germany) Dynamo Dresden	Auerbach
19:00 CEST (UTC+2)				Stadium: Arena zur Vogtlandweide

29 June 2022 Friendly	Dynamo Dresden (Germany)	0–1	(Germany) 1. FC Heidenheim	Angerberg
16:00 CEST (UTC+2)				Stadium: Sportplatz Angerberg

3 July 2022 Friendly	Dynamo Dresden (Germany)	0–0	(Belgium) Sint-Truiden	Bruckhäusl
16:00 CEST (UTC+2)		Report		Stadium: Sportplatz Bruckhäusl

9 July 2022 Friendly	Dynamo Dresden (Germany)	0–2	(Germany) Borussia Dortmund	Dresden
17:00 CEST (UTC+2)			Hummels 13'; Papadopoulos 41'	Stadium: Rudolf-Harbig-Stadion; Attendance: 23,816

16 July 2022 Friendly	Dynamo Dresden (Germany)	1–0	(Czech Republic) Teplice	Dresden
14:00 CEST (UTC+2)	Kutschke 13'	Report		Stadium: Rudolf-Harbig-Stadion

17 July 2022 Friendly	Dynamo Dresden (Germany)	3–1	(Germany) FC Oberlausitz Neugersdorf	Großpostwitz
14:30 CEST (UTC+2)		Report

19 December 2022 Friendly	Sampdoria (Italy)	2–2	(Germany) Dynamo Dresden	Belek, Turkey
17:30 TRT (UTC+3)				Stadium: Calista Sports Center - Field A

3 January 2023 Friendly	Zwickau (Germany)	0–3	(Germany) Dynamo Dresden	Zwickau
13:00 CET (UTC+1)		Report		Stadium: GGZ Arena

7 January 2023 Friendly	Dynamo Dresden (Germany)	5–0	(Poland) Miedź Legnica	Dresden
13:00 CET (UTC+1)		Report		Stadium: Walter-Fritzsch-Akademie Rasenplatz 1

== Competitions ==
=== Overall record ===
Competition	First match	Last match	Starting round	Final position	Record							
Competition	First match	Last match	Starting round	Final position	Pld	W	D	L	GF	GA	GD	Win %
3. Liga	23 July 2022	27 May 2023	Matchday 1	5th	38	20	9	9	65	44	+21	52.63
DFB-Pokal	29 July 2022		First round	First round	1	0	0	1	0	1	−1	0.00
Reg. Cup Sachsen	24 September 2022	29 March 2023	Third round	Quarter-finals	3	2	0	1	18	4	+14	66.67
Total					42	22	9	11	83	49	+34	52.38

Source: Soccerway

=== 3. Liga ===
==== League table ====
Pos	Team	Pld	W	D	L	GF	GA	GD	Pts	Promotion, qualification or relegation
4	Wehen Wiesbaden (O, P)	38	21	7	10	71	51	+20	70	Qualification for promotion play-offs and DFB-Pokal
5	1. FC Saarbrücken	38	20	9	9	64	39	+25	69	Qualification for DFB-Pokal
6	Dynamo Dresden	38	20	9	9	65	44	+21	69	
7	Waldhof Mannheim	38	19	3	16	63	65	−2	60	
8	1860 Munich	38	16	9	13	61	52	+9	57	

Source: DFB
Rules for classification: 1) Points; 2) Goal difference; 3) Goals scored; 4) Head-to-head results; 5) Head-to-head away goals scored; 6) Away goals scored; 7) Play-off.
(O) Play-off winners; (P) Promoted

==== Results summary ====
Overall								Home						Away					
Pld	W	D	L	GF	GA	GD	Pts	W	D	L	GF	GA	GD	W	D	L	GF	GA	GD
22	10	6	6	40	26	+14	36	4	4	3	24	15	+9	6	2	3	16	11	+5

Last updated: 11 February 2023.
Source: DFB

==== Results by round ====
Round	1	2	3	4	5	6	7	8	9	10	11	12	13	14	15	16	17	18	19	20	21	22	23	24
Ground	H	A	H	A	H	A	H	A	H	A	H	A	H	A	H	A	H	H	A	A	H	A	H	A
Result	L	W	W	L	L	W	W	W	D	D	W	D	L	L	D	L	D	D	W	W	W	W		
Position	14	9	7	11	11	10	7	6	5	6	4	5	7	8	7	9	9	11	9	9	8	6		

Updated to match(es) played on 11 February 2023. Source: DFB
A = Away; H = Home; W = Win; D = Draw; L = Loss

==== Matches ====
The league fixtures were announced on 24 June 2022.

23 July 2022 1	Dynamo Dresden	3–4	1860 Munich	Dresden
14:00 CEST (UTC+2)	Borkowski 70', 82'; Schäffler 73'	Report	Ehlers 8' (o.g.); Rieder 36'; Bär 68', 71'	Stadium: Rudolf-Harbig-Stadion; Attendance: 24,046; Referee: Timo Gerach

6 August 2022 2	Hallescher FC	0–2	Dynamo Dresden	Halle
14:00 CEST (UTC+2)	Zimmerschied (yellow card) 54'	Report	Nietfeld 14' (o.g.); Will (yellow card) 54'; Arslan (yellow card) 60'; Kammerknecht (yellow card) 68'; Weihrauch 80'	Stadium: Leuna Chemie Stadion; Attendance: 12,804; Referee: (Germany) Benjamin Cortus

10 August 2022 3	Dynamo Dresden	2–0	Verl	Dresden
19:00 CEST (UTC+2)	Will (yellow card) 22'; Arslan 43'; Kammerknecht 75'	Report	Šapina (red card) 34'; Baack (yellow card) 45+2'; Grodowski (yellow card) 83'	Stadium: Rudolf-Harbig-Stadion; Attendance: 22,399; Referee: (Germany) Florian Heft

13 August 2022 4	Viktoria Köln	2–1	Dynamo Dresden	Köln
14:00 CEST (UTC+2)	Meißner 22' 43'; Dietz (yellow card) 31'; Fritz (yellow card) 61'; Greger (yellow card) 80'; Siebert (yellow card) 90'	Report	Arslan 14'; Kammerknecht (yellow card) 30'; Park Kyu-hyun (yellow card) 52'; Kutschke (yellow card) 90'	Stadium: Sportpark Höhenberg; Attendance: 3,412; Referee: (Germany) Florian Exner

20 August 2022 5	Dynamo Dresden	2–3	Elversberg	Dresden
14:00 CEST (UTC+2)	Akoto (yellow card) 8'; Knipping (yellow card) 24'; Arslan 40' 90+2'; Will (yellow card) 78'	Report	Correia 4' 60'; Schnellbacher 20' (yellow card) 23'; Jacobsen (yellow card) 30'; Mustafa (yellow card) 68'	Stadium: Rudolf-Harbig-Stadion; Attendance: 18,998; Referee: (Germany) Sven Jablonski

28 August 2022 6	Erzgebirge Aue	0–1	Dynamo Dresden	Aue
14:00 CEST (UTC+2)	Jastremski (yellow card) 52'; Burger (yellow card) 87'; Danhof (yellow card) 90+4'	Report	Meier (yellow card) 83'; Conteh 85'	Stadium: Erzgebirgsstadion; Attendance: 12,983; Referee: (Germany) Florian Badstübner

3 September 2022 7	Dynamo Dresden	3–0	Borussia Dortmund II	Dresden
14:00 CEST (UTC+2)	Ehlers 9' (yellow card) 28'; Kutschke (yellow card) 61'; Arslan 65' (pen.); Kammerknecht 89'	Report	Papadopoulos (yellow card) 12'; Kamara (yellow card) 34'; Šuver (yellow card) 41' (yellow-red card) 62'; Pašalić (yellow card) 64'; Pfanne (yellow card) 86'	Stadium: Rudolf-Harbig-Stadion; Attendance: 20,731; Referee: (Germany) Tobias Schultes

11 September 2022 8	MSV Duisburg	0–1	Dynamo Dresden	Duisburg
13:00 CEST (UTC+2)	Mai (yellow card) 71'; Senger (yellow card) 90+3'	Report	Arslan (yellow card) 45+2'; Hauptmann (yellow card) 45+2'; Kutschke 72' (pen.); Ehlers (yellow card) 74'; Lewald (yellow card) 90+6'	Stadium: Schauinsland-Reisen-Arena; Attendance: 13,557; Referee: (Germany) Lukas Benen

17 September 2022 9	Dynamo Dresden	1–1	Ingolstadt	Dresden
14:00 CEST (UTC+2)	Kutschke 2'; Gogia (yellow card) 6'; Melichenko (yellow card) 39'	Report	Testroet 25'; Antonitsch (yellow card) 69' (yellow-red card) 87'	Stadium: Rudolf-Harbig-Stadion; Attendance: 20,302; Referee: (Germany) Florian Lechner

1 October 2022 10	Bayreuth	1–1	Dynamo Dresden	Bayreuth
14:00 CEST (UTC+2)	Nollenberger 45'; Steffen Eder (yellow card) 47'	Report	Schäffler 7'; Akoto (yellow card) 34'; Arslan (yellow card) 53'	Stadium: Hans-Walter-Wild-Stadion; Attendance: 8,173; Referee: (Germany) Michael Bacher

9 October 2022 11	Dynamo Dresden	3–2	Osnabrück	Dresden
13:00 CEST (UTC+2)	Gogia (yellow card) 51'; Arslan 53'; Will 57'; Kammerknecht 70'	Report	Akoto 35' (o.g.); Tesche 40'; Niemann (yellow card) 46'; Simakala (yellow card) 61'; Köhler (yellow card) 72'; Rorig (yellow card) 84'	Stadium: Rudolf-Harbig-Stadion; Attendance: 21,762; Referee: (Germany) Wolfgang Haslberger

15 October 2022 12	Rot-Weiss Essen	1–1	Dynamo Dresden	Essen
14:00 CEST (UTC+2)	Young 22'; Götze (yellow card) 31'; Wiegel (red card) 52'	Report	Meier (yellow card) 52'; Schäffler 89'	Stadium: Stadion an der Hafenstraße; Attendance: 18,300; Referee: (Germany) Tom Bauer

=== DFB-Pokal ===
29 July 2022 First round	Dynamo Dresden	0–1	VfB Stuttgart	Dresden
18:01 CEST (UTC+2)	Akoto (yellow card) 48'	Report	Churlinov 33'; Anton (yellow card) 61' (yellow-red card) 67'; Millot (yellow card) 90'; Endo (yellow card) 90+5'	Stadium: Rudolf-Harbig-Stadion; Attendance: 22,644; Referee: Florian Badstübner

=== Reg. Cup Sachsen ===
24 September 2022 Third Round	Frisch Auf Wurzen	0–11	Dynamo Dresden	Dresden
16:00 CEST (UTC+2)		Report		Stadium: Stadion im Sportforum Jägerpark

16 November 2022 Round of 16	Plauen	3–7	Dynamo Dresden	Plauen
15:00 CEST (UTC+2)		Report		Stadium: Vogtland Stadium

29 March 2023 Quarter-Finals	Dynamo Dresden	0–1	Zwickau	Dresden
19:00 CEST (UTC+2)		Report	Löhmannsröben 10'	Stadium: Rudolf-Harbig-Stadion
