= 2024–25 SC Verl season =

SC Verl
2024–25 season
- Manager: Alexander Ende
- Stadium: Sportclub Arena
- 3. Liga: Pre-season
- Westphalian Cup: Round of 16
- Top goalscorer: League: Jonas Arweiler (3); All: Jonas Arweiler (3)

The 2024–25 season is the 101st season in the history of SC Verl, and the club's fifth consecutive season in 3. Liga. In addition to the domestic league, the team is scheduled to participate in the Westphalian Cup.

== Transfers ==
=== In ===
Pos.	Player	Transferred from	Fee	Date	Source
MF	(Germany) Chilohelm Onuoha	(Germany) 1. FC Köln	Loan	2 July 2024	
MF	(Germany) Julian Stark	(Germany) SC Freiburg II	Free	13 July 2024	

=== Out ===
Pos.	Player	Transferred to	Fee	Date	Source
FW	(Germany) Hendrik Mittelstädt	(Germany) Fortuna Köln	Undisclosed	10 July 2024	

== Friendlies ==
26 June 2024 Friendly	SC Verl (Germany)	4–2	(Germany) Schalke 04 II	Verl
16:00	Steczyk 17', 21', 33'; Onuoha 74'		Frese 27'; Heiserholt 67'	Stadium: Zum Furlbach Hauptplatz

29 June 2024 Friendly	SC Paderborn II (Germany)	2–1	(Germany) SC Verl
12:00	De Jong 45'; Vega Zambrano 61'		Mannhardt 44'

2 July 2024 Friendly	SC Verl (Germany)	3–2	(Germany) Rot-Weiß Oberhausen
18:00

6 July 2024 Friendly	Hannover 96 (Germany)	2–1	(Germany) SC Verl	Hanover
14:00	Tresoldi 50'; Halstenberg 56'		Steczyk 51'	Stadium: 96 Das Stadion

18 July 2024 Friendly	SC Verl (Germany)	0–1	(Germany) Schalke 04
18:30			Aydın 24'

24 July 2024 Friendly	SC Verl (Germany)	2–0	(Netherlands) FC Emmen
16:00

27 July 2024 Friendly	De Graafschap (Netherlands)	0–1	(Germany) SC Verl
16:00

== Competitions ==
=== Overall record ===
Competition	First match	Last match	Starting round	Record							
Competition	First match	Last match	Starting round	Pld	W	D	L	GF	GA	GD	Win %
3. Liga	2–4 August 2024	17 May 2025	Matchday 1	0	0	0	0	0	0	+0	—
Westphalian Cup				0	0	0	0	0	0	+0	—
Total				0	0	0	0	0	0	+0	—

Source: Soccerway

=== 3. Liga ===
==== League table ====
Pos	Team	Pld	W	D	L	GF	GA	GD	Pts
5	Hansa Rostock	38	18	6	14	54	46	+8	60
6	Viktoria Köln	38	18	5	15	59	48	+11	59
7	SC Verl	38	15	12	11	62	55	+7	57
8	Rot-Weiss Essen	38	16	8	14	55	54	+1	56
9	Wehen Wiesbaden	38	15	10	13	59	60	−1	55

Source: DFB
Rules for classification: 1) Points; 2) Goal difference; 3) Goals scored; 4) Head-to-head results; 5) Head-to-head away goals scored; 6) Away goals scored; 7) Play-off.

==== Matches ====
The match schedule was released on 9 July 2024.

3 August 2024 1	SC Verl	2–2	Wehen Wiesbaden
14:00

10 August 2024 2	Alemannia Aachen	1–1	SC Verl	Aachen
14:00 CEST	Benschop (red card) 11'; Goden (yellow card) 47'; Scepanik 52' (yellow card) 71'; Soufiane El-Faouzi (yellow card) 63'; Jan-Luca Rompf (yellow card) 81'; Mika Hanraths (yellow card) 90'	Report	Fabio Gruber (yellow card) 28'; Baack (yellow card) 30'; Michel Stöcker 45+1'	Stadium: New Tivoli; Attendance: 23,100; Referee: (Germany) Felix Bickel

25 August 2024 3	SC Verl	1–1	Waldhof Mannheim	Verl
16:30 CEST	Chilohem Onuoha 80'; Stark (yellow card) 83'	Report	Lohkemper 15'; Klünter (yellow card) 16'; Arase (yellow card) 48'; Kobylański (yellow card) 90'	Stadium: Sportclub Arena; Attendance: 2,160; Referee: (Germany) Felix Wagner

1 September 2024 4	Hannover 96 II	1–2	SC Verl	Hanover
19:30 CEST	Sean Busch 82' (yellow card) 90+4'	Report	Benger (yellow card) 26'; Timur Gayret 30'; Arweiler 33'; Stark (yellow card) 75'	Stadium: Heinz-von-Heiden-Arena; Attendance: 2,000; Referee: (Germany) Felix Grund

15 September 2024 5	SC Verl	0–3	Energie Cottbus	Verl
16:30 CEST	Fabio Gruber (yellow card) 52' (yellow-red card) 85'	Report	Krauß 19' 72'; Ciğerci 55'	Stadium: Sportclub Arena; Attendance: 2,618; Referee: (Germany) Tobias Wittmann

22 September 2024 6	Viktoria Köln	2–1	SC Verl	Köln
16:30 CEST	Cabral (yellow card) 12'; Dietz (yellow card) 22'; Serhat-Semih Güler 90+2' 90+6'	Report	Arweiler (yellow card) 6'; Baack 22'; Michel Stöcker (yellow card) 36'	Stadium: Sportpark Höhenberg; Attendance: 2,611; Referee: (Germany) Justin Hasmann

25 September 2024 7	SC Verl	0–3	Dynamo Dresden	Verl
19:00 CEST		Report	Meißner 13'; Casar (yellow card) 28'; Daferner 45+2' 62' (pen.)	Stadium: Sportclub Arena; Attendance: 2,536; Referee: (Germany) Max Burda

29 September 2024 8	Arminia Bielefeld	2–1	SC Verl	Bielefeld
19:30 CEST	Kania 45'; Hagmann (yellow card) 61'; Großer (yellow card) 63'; Felix (yellow card) 81' (goal) 90+2'; Russo (yellow card) 90'	Report	Arweiler 7'; Baack (yellow card) 29'; Michel Stöcker (yellow card) 34'; Philipp Schulze (yellow card) 35'; Tim Köhler (yellow card) 45+3'; Kijewski (yellow card) 65'	Stadium: SchücoArena; Attendance: 18,705; Referee: (Germany) Felix Weller

5 October 2024 9	SC Verl	2–0	Unterhaching	Verl
14:00 CEST	Taz (yellow card) 53' (goal) 62'; Timur Gayret (yellow card) 76'; Fabio Gruber (yellow card) 79'; Kyeremateng (yellow card) 87'	Report		Stadium: Sportclub Arena; Attendance: 1,503; Referee: (Germany) Yannick Rupert

19 October 2024 10	FC Ingolstadt 04	1–1	SC Verl	Ingolstadt
14:00 CET	Grønning 64'; Lorenz (yellow card) 73'	Report	Benger 11'; Otto (yellow card) 52'; Lokotsch (yellow card) 70'; Stark (yellow card) 79'	Stadium: Audi Sportpark; Attendance: 5,291; Referee: (Germany) Timon Schulz
