= 2024–25 Dynamo Dresden season =

Dynamo Dresden
2024–25 season
- Manager: Thomas Stamm
- Stadium: Rudolf-Harbig-Stadion
- 3. Liga: 2nd (promoted)
- DFB-Pokal: Second round
- Saxony Cup: Third round
- Top goalscorer: League: Christoph Daferner (18); All: Christoph Daferner (18)
- Average home league attendance: 28,991

The 2024–25 season was the 72nd in the history of Dynamo Dresden and the third consecutive season in the German 3. Liga. The team also competed in the DFB-Pokal and the Saxony Cup.

== Transfers ==
=== In ===
Pos.	Player	Transferred from	Fee	Date	Source
DF	(Kosovo) Andi Hoti	(Germany) 1. FC Magdeburg	Loan	3 January 2025	
MF	(Germany) Dominik Kother	(Germany) Jahn Regensburg	Undisclosed	6 January 2025	

== Pre-season and friendlies ==
6 July 2024 Friendly	Dynamo Dresden	1–2	Hessen Kassel
13:00

13 July 2024 Friendly	Dynamo Dresden	2–1	Viktoria Berlin
15:00

14 July 2024 Friendly	SC Freital	1–2	Dynamo Dresden
14:00

20 July 2024 Friendly	Chemnitzer FC	1–0	Dynamo Dresden
14:30

27 July 2024 Friendly	Dynamo Dresden	1–2	Jahn Regensburg
14:00

5 September 2024 Friendly	Dynamo Dresden	2–2	Hertha BSC II
15:00

14 November 2024 Friendly	Dynamo Dresden	6–1	Rot-Weiß Erfurt
14:00

20 March 2025 Friendly	Dynamo Dresden	3–2	(Czech Republic) Teplice
15:30

== Competitions ==
=== Overall record ===
Competition	First match	Last match	Starting round	Final position	Record							
Competition	First match	Last match	Starting round	Final position	Pld	W	D	L	GF	GA	GD	Win %
3. Liga	4 August 2024	17 May 2025	Matchday 1		18	10	5	3	35	20	+15	55.56
DFB-Pokal	18 August 2024	30 October 2024	First round	Second round	2	1	0	1	4	3	+1	50.00
Total					20	11	5	4	39	23	+16	55.00

Last updated: 13 December 2024
Source: Competitions

=== 3. Liga ===
==== League table ====
Pos	Team	Pld	W	D	L	GF	GA	GD	Pts	Promotion, qualification or relegation
1	Arminia Bielefeld (C, P)	38	21	9	8	64	36	+28	72	Promotion to 2. Bundesliga and qualification for DFB-Pokal
2	Dynamo Dresden (P)	38	20	10	8	71	40	+31	70	Promotion to 2. Bundesliga and qualification for DFB-Pokal
3	1. FC Saarbrücken	38	18	11	9	59	47	+12	65	Qualification for promotion play-offs and DFB-Pokal
4	Energie Cottbus	38	18	8	12	64	54	+10	62	Qualification for DFB-Pokal
5	Hansa Rostock	38	18	6	14	54	46	+8	60	

Source: DFB
Rules for classification: 1) Points; 2) Goal difference; 3) Goals scored; 4) Head-to-head results; 5) Head-to-head away goals scored; 6) Away goals scored; 7) Play-off.
(C) Champions; (P) Promoted

==== Results summary ====
Overall								Home						Away					
Pld	W	D	L	GF	GA	GD	Pts	W	D	L	GF	GA	GD	W	D	L	GF	GA	GD
32	17	9	6	61	35	+26	60	9	6	1	34	17	+17	8	3	5	27	18	+9

Last updated: 9 April 2025.
Source: soccerway

==== Results by round ====
Round	1	2	3	4	5	6	7	8	9	10	11	12	13	14	15	16	17	18	19	20	21	22	23	24	25	26	27	28	29	30	31	32	33	34	35	36	37	38
Ground	A	H	A	H	A	H	A	H	A	H	A	H	A	A	H	A	H	H	A	H	A	H	A	H	A	H	A	H	A	H	A	H	H	A	H	A	A	H
Result	W	W	L	W	W	D	W	D	L	D	L	W	D	W	D	W	W	W	W	L	D	W	L	W	L	W	W	D	D	W	W	D						
Position	4	1	4	3	1	2	1	1	2	2	6	4	4	3	3	2	2	2	1	2	2	2	2	2	2	1	1	1	1	1	1	1						

Updated to match(es) played on 9 April 2025. Source: worldfootball
A = Away; H = Home; W = Win; D = Draw; L = Loss

==== Matches ====
The match schedule was released on 9 July 2024.

4 August 2024 1	Viktoria Köln	1–2	Dynamo Dresden	Cologne

9 August 2024 2	Dynamo Dresden	4–2	Energie Cottbus	Dresden
				Stadium: Rudolf-Harbig-Stadion

23 August 2024 3	Erzgebirge Aue	2–0	Dynamo Dresden

31 August 2024 4	Dynamo Dresden	2–0	VfB Stuttgart II	Dresden
				Stadium: Rudolf-Harbig-Stadion

14 September 2024 5	1860 München	2–3	Dynamo Dresden	Munich

21 September 2024 6	Dynamo Dresden	1–1	Hansa Rostock	Dresden
				Stadium: Rudolf-Harbig-Stadion

25 September 2024 7	SC Verl	0–3	Dynamo Dresden	Verl
				Stadium: Sportclub Arena

29 September 2024 8	Dynamo Dresden	0–0	Alemannia Aachen	Dresden
				Stadium: Rudolf-Harbig-Stadion

4 October 2024 9	Borussia Dortmund II	2–1	Dynamo Dresden	Dortmund
				Stadium: Stadion Rote Erde

20 October 2024 10	Dynamo Dresden	3–3	Rot-Weiss Essen	Dresden
				Stadium: Rudolf-Harbig-Stadion

23 October 2024 11	Wehen Wiesbaden	1–0	Dynamo Dresden	Wiesbaden

26 October 2024 12	Dynamo Dresden	2–1	Hannover 96 II	Dresden
				Stadium: Rudolf-Harbig-Stadion

2 November 2024 13	FC Ingolstadt	1–1	Dynamo Dresden	Ingolstadt
				Stadium: Audi Sportpark

9 November 2024 14	VfL Osnabrück	0–3	Dynamo Dresden	Osnabrück
				Stadium: Stadion an der Bremer Brücke

23 November 2024 15	Dynamo Dresden	1–1	1. FC Saarbrücken	Dresden
	Kubatta 90+1'		Brünker 60'	Stadium: Rudolf-Harbig-Stadion

30 November 2024 16	SV Sandhausen	2–4	Dynamo Dresden	Sandhausen
	Baumann 24'; Otto 41'; Halimi (red card) 88'		Daferner 29', 53'; Šapina 59'; Oehmichen 61'	Stadium: Hardtwaldstadion

8 December 2024 17	Dynamo Dresden	3–0	Arminia Bielefeld	Dresden
16:30				Stadium: Rudolf-Harbig-Stadion

13 December 2024 18	Dynamo Dresden	2–1	Waldhof Mannheim	Dresden
				Stadium: Rudolf-Harbig-Stadion

21 December 2024 19	SpVgg Unterhaching	0–3	Dynamo Dresden	Unterhaching
14:00	Schwabl (yellow card) 56'; Geis (yellow card) 68'	Report	Jonas Oehmichen (yellow card) 3'; Casar 8'; Hauptmann (yellow card) 36'; David Kubatta 68'; Kutschke 74' (pen.)	Stadium: Sportpark Unterhaching; Attendance: 10,925; Referee: (Germany) Jarno Wienefeld

19 January 2025 20	Dynamo Dresden	2–3	Viktoria Köln	Dresden
13:30 CET	Lemmer 40'; Daferner (yellow card) 40'; Kutschke 86'	Report	Serhat-Semih Güler 20'; Saïd El Mala 25'; Lobinger 76'; Dietz (yellow card) 90'	Stadium: Rudolf-Harbig-Stadion; Attendance: 27,783; Referee: (Germany) Assad Nouhoum

25 January 2025 21	Energie Cottbus	1–1	Dynamo Dresden	Cottbus
14:00 CET	Pelivan (yellow card) 77'; Bretschneider (yellow card) 81'; Thiele 86'	Report	Kutschke 60'; David Kubatta (yellow card) 67'	Stadium: LEAG Energie Stadion; Attendance: 19,700; Referee: (Germany) Patrick Alt

1 February 2025 22	Dynamo Dresden	2–1	Erzgebirge Aue	Dresden
14:00 CET	Daferner 2' (yellow card) 24'; Casar (yellow card) 45+1'; Kother 63'; Heise (yellow card) 90'	Report	Sijarić 13'; Barylla (yellow card) 24'; Niko Vukancic (yellow card) 31'; Fabisch (yellow card) 82'; Bär (yellow card) 90+3'	Stadium: Rudolf-Harbig-Stadion; Attendance: 31,858; Referee: (Germany) Marc Philip Eckermann

8 February 2025 23	Stuttgart II	2–1	Dynamo Dresden	Aspach
14:00 CET	Jarzinho Malanga (yellow card) 18'; Ulrich 38' (yellow card) 50'; Di Benedetto (yellow card) 42' (goal) 48'; Nothnagel (yellow card) 45+2'; Sankoh (red card) 68'; Chase (yellow card) 71'; Mack (yellow card) 82'; Benjamin Boakye (yellow card) 90+2'	Report	Tony Menzel (yellow card) 42'; Hauptmann (yellow card) 71'; Kutschke 87' (pen.); David Kubatta (yellow card) 88'	Stadium: WIRmachenDRUCK Arena; Attendance: 6,151; Referee: (Germany) Yannick Rupert

16 February 2025 24	Dynamo Dresden	5–2	1860 Munich	Dresden
19:30 CET	Daferner 6' 32'; Hoti 39'; Tony Menzel 63'; Lemmer 70'; Casar (yellow card) 83'	Report	Kwadwo 9' (yellow card) 43'; Danhof (yellow card) 22'; Jacobsen (yellow card) 24'; Anderson Lucoqui (yellow card) 74'; Wolfram 90+2' (pen.)	Stadium: Rudolf-Harbig-Stadion; Attendance: 29,004; Referee: (Germany) Nicolas Winter

22 February 2025 25	Hansa Rostock	1–0	Dynamo Dresden	Rostock
14:00 CET	Fröling 11' (yellow card) 40'; King Manu (yellow card) 74'; Lebeau (yellow card) 90+4'; Kinsombi (yellow card) 90+5'	Report	Risch (yellow card) 5'; Sterner (yellow card) 32'; Bünning (yellow card) 87'	Stadium: Ostseestadion; Attendance: 26,000; Referee: (Germany) Tom Bauer

1 March 2025 26	Dynamo Dresden	3–0	Verl	Dresden
16:30 CET	Daferner 8'; Boeder (yellow card) 50'; Hauptmann 57'; Kother 72'; Hoti (yellow card) 90+4'	Report	Otto (yellow card) 90+1'	Stadium: Rudolf-Harbig-Stadion; Attendance: 27,030; Referee: (Germany) Nico Fuchs

8 March 2025 27	Alemannia Aachen	0–1	Dynamo Dresden	Aachen
14:00 CET	Lamar Yarbrough (yellow card) 77'; Baxter (yellow card) 90'; Olschowsky (yellow card) 90+5'; Benschop (yellow card) 90+5'	Report	Tony Menzel (yellow card) 26'; Daferner (yellow card) 41'; Hauptmann 45+2'; Schreiber (yellow card) 81'; Lemmer (yellow card) 83'	Stadium: Tivoli; Attendance: 30,700; Referee: (Germany) Tobias Wittmann

12 March 2025 28	Dynamo Dresden	0–0	Borussia Dortmund II	Dresden
19:00 CET	Sterner (yellow card) 30'; Šapina (yellow card) 45'	Report	Göbel (yellow card) 50'; Tony Reitz (yellow card) 52'; Franz Roggow (yellow card) 67'; Eberwein (yellow card) 77'; Ostrzinski (yellow card) 85'	Stadium: Rudolf-Harbig-Stadion; Attendance: 24,114; Referee: (Germany) Felix Bickel

15 March 2025 29	Rot-Weiss Essen	1–1	Dynamo Dresden	Essen
14:00 CET	Tom Moustier (yellow card) 16'; Arslan 50' (yellow card) 90+5'; Martinović (yellow card) 60'; José-Enrique Ríos Alonso (yellow card) 65'; Schultz (yellow card) 90+4'; Mizuta (yellow card) 90+4'	Report	Bünning (yellow card) 20'; Boeder 65'; Daferner (yellow card) 88'	Stadium: Stadion an der Hafenstraße; Attendance: 19,300; Referee: (Germany) Timon Schulz

30 March 2025 30	Dynamo Dresden	2–0	Wehen Wiesbaden	Dresden
16:30 CET	Moritz Flotho 10' (o.g.); Daferner 56'	Report	Tarik Gözüsirin (yellow card) 30'; Kaya (yellow card) 64'; Carstens (yellow card) 75'; Luckeneder (yellow card) 85'	Stadium: Rudolf-Harbig-Stadion; Attendance: 30,267; Referee: (Germany) Konrad Oldhafer

4 April 2025 31	Hannover 96 II	2–3	Dynamo Dresden	Hanover
19:00 CET	Sulejmani 40'; Jeremie Niklaus (yellow card) 45+3'; Eric Uhlmann 86'	Report	Kother 20' 28'; Risch (yellow card) 30'; Daferner 55' (pen.); Kutschke (yellow card) 85'	Stadium: Heinz-von-Heiden-Arena; Attendance: 11,980; Referee: (Germany) Assad Nouhoum

9 April 2025 32	Dynamo Dresden	2–2	Ingolstadt	Dresden
19:00 CET	Risch (yellow card) 14'; Hauptmann (yellow card) 40'; Sterner 42'; Bünning (yellow card) 68' (goal) 73'; Šapina (yellow card) 68'; Schreiber (yellow card) 90+6'	Report	Heike (yellow card) 3' (goal) 35'; Testroet 48'; Fröde (yellow card) 61'; Lorenz (yellow card) 83'; Cvjetinović (yellow card) 90+6'; Borkowski (yellow card) 90+8'	Stadium: Rudolf-Harbig-Stadion; Attendance: 27,486; Referee: (Germany) Felix Weller

12 April 2025 33	Dynamo Dresden	–	Osnabrück	Dresden
14:00 CET				Stadium: Rudolf-Harbig-Stadion

=== DFB-Pokal ===
18 August 2024 First round	Dynamo Dresden	2–0	Fortuna Düsseldorf	Dresden
	Kastenmeier 17' (o.g.); Meißner 69'			Stadium: Rudolf-Harbig-Stadion

30 October 2024 Second round	Dynamo Dresden	2–3	Darmstadt 98	Dresden
				Stadium: Rudolf-Harbig-Stadion

=== Saxony Cup ===
12 October 2024 Third round	Chemnitzer FC	3–1	Dynamo Dresden	Chemnitz
				Stadium: Stadion an der Gellertstraße
