= 2023–24 SC Verl season =

SC Verl
2023–24 season
- Chairman: Raimund Bertels
- Manager: Alexander Ende
- Stadium: Sportclub Arena
- 3. Liga: 12th
- Westphalian Cup: Runners-up

The 2023–24 season was SC Verl's 100th season in existence and fourth consecutive in the 3. Liga. They also competed in the Westphalian Cup.

== Players ==
=== First-team squad ===
As of 4 September 2023

Note: Flags indicate national team as defined under FIFA eligibility rules; some limited exceptions apply. Players may hold more than one non-FIFA nationality.

No.	Pos.	Nation	Player
1	GK	GER	Luca Unbehaun
2	DF	GER	Fabio Gruber
4	DF	GER	Daniel Mikic
5	MF	GER	Tom Baack
7	MF	GER	Maximilian Wolfram
8	MF	GER	Marcel Mehlem
11	DF	GER	Nico Ochojski
13	FW	GER	Lars Lokotsch
15	MF	GER	Patrick Kammerbauer
16	DF	GER	Torge Paetow
17	MF	GER	Oliver Batista Meier (on loan from Dynamo Dresden)
18	FW	GER	Hendrik Mittelstädt

No.	Pos.	Nation	Player
19	FW	GER	Robin Friedrich
20	DF	GER	Gideon Guzy
21	DF	GER	Tobias Knost
23	MF	GER	Marcel Benger
24	DF	GER	Michel Stöcker
25	GK	GER	Tom Müller
27	MF	USA	Mael Corboz (captain)
29	MF	GER	Joscha Wosz
30	MF	GER	Nicolás Sessa
32	GK	GER	Fabian Pekruhl
34	DF	GER	Nick Otto
40	GK	GER	Leon Nübel

=== Out on loan ===
Note: Flags indicate national team as defined under FIFA eligibility rules; some limited exceptions apply. Players may hold more than one non-FIFA nationality.

No.	Pos.	Nation	Player
—	FW	GER	Mateo Biondic (at Eintracht Trier until 30 June 2024)
—	FW	GER	Eduard Probst (at Gütersloh until 30 June 2024)

No.	Pos.	Nation	Player
—	FW	GER	Willi Reincke (at Bocholt until 30 June 2024)

== Transfers ==
=== In ===
Pos.	Player	Transferred from	Fee	Date	Source
DF	(Germany) Fabio Gruber	(Germany) FC Augsburg II	Free	1 July 2023	
MF	(Germany) Marcel Benger	(Germany) Holstein Kiel	Free	1 July 2023	
GK	(Germany) Luca Unbehaun	(Germany) Borussia Dortmund	Free	1 July 2023	
FW	(Germany) Lars Lokotsch	(Germany) Fortuna Köln	€20,000	1 July 2023	
MF	(Germany) Marcel Mehlem	(Germany) SC Paderborn	Free	1 September 2023	

=== Out ===
Pos.	Player	Transferred to	Fee	Date	Source
MF	(Germany) [[]]	(Germany)		July 2023	

== Pre-season and friendlies ==
Win Draw Loss

1 July 2023 Friendly	FC Gütersloh (Germany)	2–3	(Germany) SC Verl
14:00 CEST (UTC+2)	Kandić 4', 40'		Kammerbauer 1'; Meier 25'; Sessa 64'

8 July 2023 Friendly	TSV Havelse (Germany)	1–1	(Germany) SC Verl
15:00 CEST (UTC+2)

15 July 2023 Friendly	SC Verl (Germany)	3–1	(Germany) VfL Bochum	Verl
15:00 CEST (UTC+2)	Wolfram 39'; Friedrich 81'; Pernot 89'		Ordets 4'	Stadium: Sportclub Arena

20 July 2023 Friendly	SC Verl (Germany)	4–1	(Germany) Alemannia Aachen
16:30 CEST (UTC+2)	Lokotsch 15', 51'; Probst 72'; Mittelstädt 74'		Schwermann 30'

22 July 2023 Friendly	Almere City (Netherlands)	1–0	(Germany) SC Verl
15:00 CEST (UTC+2)	Duijvestijn 20'

== Competitions ==
=== Overall record ===
Competition	First match	Last match	Starting round	Final position	Record							
Competition	First match	Last match	Starting round	Final position	Pld	W	D	L	GF	GA	GD	Win %
3. Liga	5 August 2023	18 May 2024	Matchday 1	12th	38	14	11	13	59	56	+3	36.84
Westphalian Cup	8 August 2023	25 May 2024	First round	Runners-up	6	4	1	1	15	4	+11	66.67
Total					44	18	12	14	74	60	+14	40.91

Source: Soccerway

=== 3. Liga ===
==== League table ====
Pos	Team	Pld	W	D	L	GF	GA	GD	Pts
10	FC Ingolstadt	38	14	12	12	65	51	+14	54
11	Borussia Dortmund II (Note: Reserve teams are ineligible for promotion or DFB-Pokal qualification.)	38	14	12	12	58	53	+5	54
12	SC Verl	38	14	11	13	59	56	+3	53
13	Viktoria Köln	38	13	10	15	59	65	−6	49
14	Arminia Bielefeld	38	11	13	14	48	47	+1	46

Source: DFB
Rules for classification: 1) Points; 2) Goal difference; 3) Goals scored; 4) Head-to-head results; 5) Head-to-head away goals scored; 6) Away goals scored; 7) Play-off.

==== Results summary ====
Overall								Home						Away					
Pld	W	D	L	GF	GA	GD	Pts	W	D	L	GF	GA	GD	W	D	L	GF	GA	GD
38	14	11	13	59	56	+3	53	7	7	5	32	27	+5	7	4	8	27	29	−2

==== Results by round ====
Round	1	2	3	4	5	6	7	8	9	10	11
Ground	A	H	A	H	H	A	H	A	H	A	H
Result	L	L	L	W	D	W	L	L	W	W	D
Position	18	20	20	18	17	11	16	18	15	12	13

A = Away; H = Home; W = Win; D = Draw; L = Loss

==== Matches ====
The league fixtures were unveiled on 7 July 2023.

5 August 2023 1	Viktoria Köln	3–1	SC Verl	Cologne
14:00 CEST (UTC+2)				Stadium: Sportpark Höhenberg

20 August 2023 2	SC Verl	1–2	Jahn Regensburg	Verl
16:30 CEST (UTC+2)				Stadium: Sportclub Arena

23 August 2023 3	1. FC Saarbrücken	4–3	SC Verl	Saarbrücken
19:00 CEST (UTC+2)	Rabihic 4' (pen.); Schmidt 60'; Brünker 76'; Becker 90+1'		Paetow 34'; Lokotsch 36'; Batista Meier 54'	Stadium: Ludwigsparkstadion; Attendance: 9,026; Referee: Assad Nouhoum

26 August 2023 4	SC Verl	3–2	SC Freiburg II	Verl
14:00 CEST (UTC+2)				Stadium: Sportclub Arena; Attendance: 1,348; Referee: Florian Lechner

2 September 2023 5	SC Verl	0–0	SpVgg Unterhaching	Verl
14:00 CEST (UTC+2)				Stadium: Sportclub Arena

15 September 2023 6	MSV Duisburg	2–3	SC Verl	Duisburg
19:00 CEST (UTC+2)				Stadium: MSV-Arena; Attendance: 10,447; Referee: Luca Jürgensen

23 September 2023 7	SC Verl	2–3	Borussia Dortmund II	Verl
14:00 CEST (UTC+2)	Wolfram 22'; Batista Meier 63'		Hettwer 15'; Göbel 74'; Butler 90+4'	Stadium: Sportclub Arena; Attendance: 1,749; Referee: Patrick Kessel

30 September 2023 8	1860 Munich	1–0	SC Verl	Munich
14:00 CEST (UTC+2)				Stadium: Grünwalder Stadion; Attendance: 15,000; Referee: Jarno Wienefeld

3 October 2023 9	SC Verl	3–1	Arminia Bielefeld	Verl
19:00 CEST (UTC+2)	Batista Meier 6'; Ochojski 42'; Otto 80'		Klos 63'	Stadium: Sportclub Arena; Attendance: 5,207; Referee: Lukas Benen

7 October 2023 10	Rot-Weiss Essen	0–5	SC Verl	Essen
14:00 CEST (UTC+2)				Stadium: Stadion an der Hafenstraße; Attendance: 14,907; Referee: Eric Weisbach

14 October 2023 11	SC Verl	2–2	FC Ingolstadt	Verl
14:00 CEST (UTC+2)				Stadium: Sportclub Arena; Attendance: 2,085; Referee: Nico Fuchs

24 November 2023 16	Waldhof Mannheim	v	SC Verl	Mannheim
19:00 CET (UTC+1)				Stadium: Carl-Benz-Stadion

=== Westphalian Cup ===
8 August 2023 First round	Hannibal	0–3	Verl

6 September 2023 Second round	Bövinghausen	0–2	Verl

18 October 2023 Round of 16	SC Wiedenbrück	1–1 (2–4 p)	Verl	Rheda-Wiedenbrück
				Stadium: Jahnstadion

15 November 2023 Quarter-finals	Verl	5–0	Wattenscheid 09	Verl
				Stadium: Sportclub Arena

26 March 2024 Semi-finals	Verl	3–0	Lippstadt 08	Verl
19:00				Stadium: Sportclub Arena

25 May 2024 Final	Arminia Bielefeld	3–1	Verl	Bielefeld
16:45				Stadium: SchücoArena
