= Claudio Kammerknecht =

Sri Lankan footballer (born 1999)

Personal information
- Full name: Claudio Matthias Kammerknecht
- Date of birth: 7 July 1999 (age 27)
- Place of birth: Emmendingen, Germany
- Height: 1.87 m (6 ft 2 in)
- Position: Defender

Team information
- Current team: Waldhof Mannheim
- Number: 15

Youth career
- –2011: FC Sexau
- 2011–2018: SC Freiburg

Senior career*
Years	Team	Apps	(Gls)
2018–2022	SC Freiburg II	66	(1)
2022–2026	Dynamo Dresden	113	(8)
2026–	Waldhof Mannheim	10	(0)

International career^{‡}
2024–	Sri Lanka	13	(1)
- * Club domestic league appearances and goals as of 7 November 2026 ‡ National team caps and goals as of 11 November 2026

Claudio Matthias Kammerknecht (Sinhala: ක්ලෝඩියෝ මැතියස් කමර්ක්නෙච්ට්; born 7 July 1999) is a professional footballer who plays as a defender for 3. Liga club Waldhof Mannheim. Born in Germany, he plays for the Sri Lanka national team.

== Club career ==
Kammerknecht is a youth academy graduate of SC Freiburg. He made his league debut for club's reserve side on 29 September 2018 in a 3–2 defeat against SV Elversberg.

On 30 May 2022, Dynamo Dresden announced the signing of Kammerknecht on a four-year deal until June 2026.

On 19 June 2026, Kammerknecht moved to Waldhof Mannheim in 3. Liga.

== International career ==
In September 2022, Kammerknecht received his first call-up to the Sri Lanka national team to take part in a training camp held in Doha. He made his international debut on 22 March 2024 in a goalless draw against Papua New Guinea. He scored his first international goal on 10 September 2024 against Cambodia in the 2027 AFC Asian Cup qualification play-off.

== Personal life ==
Kammerknecht was born in Germany to a German father and a Sri Lankan mother. His father Matthias Kammerknecht is a former footballer and manager.

== Career statistics ==
=== Club ===
As of match played 7 November 2026

Appearances and goals by club, season and competition
Club	Season	League			DFB-Pokal		Other		Total	
Club	Season	Division	Apps	Goals	Apps	Goals	Apps	Goals	Apps	Goals
SC Freiburg II	2018–19	Regionalliga Südwest	2	0	—		—		2	0
SC Freiburg II	2019–20	Regionalliga Südwest	15	0	—		—		15	0
SC Freiburg II	2020–21	Regionalliga Südwest	26	1	—		—		26	1
SC Freiburg II	2021–22	3. Liga	23	0	—		—		23	0
SC Freiburg II	Total		66	1	0	0	0	0	66	1
Dynamo Dresden	2022–23	3. Liga	34	4	1	0	0	0	35	4
Dynamo Dresden	2023–24	3. Liga	37	2	—		2 (Note: Appearance(s) in Saxony Cup)	0	39	2
Dynamo Dresden	2024–25	3. Liga	29	1	2	0	1	0	32	1
Dynamo Dresden	2025–26	2. Bundesliga	12	1	0	0	—		12	1
Dynamo Dresden	Total		112	8	3	0	3	0	118	8
Waldhof Mannheim	2026–27	3. Liga	10	0	1	0	2 (Note: Appearances in Baden Cup)	0	13	0
Career total			188	9	4	0	5	0	197	9

=== International ===
As of match played 11 November 2026

Appearances and goals by national team and year
National team	Year	Apps	Goals
Sri Lanka	2024	4	1
Sri Lanka	2025	6	0
Sri Lanka	2026	3	0
Total		13	1

Scores and results list Sri Lanka's goal tally first, score column indicates score after each Kammerknecht goal.

List of international goals scored by Claudio Kammerknecht
No.	Date	Venue	Opponent	Score	Result	Competition
1	10 September 2024	Olympic Stadium, Phnom Penh, Cambodia	Cambodia	2–2	2–2 (a.e.t.); 4–2 (p)	2027 AFC Asian Cup qualification

== Honours ==
SC Freiburg II

- Regionalliga Südwest: 2020–21

Dynamo Dresden

- Saxony Cup: 2023–24
