= Vlachodimos =

Vlachodimos (Greek: Βλαχοδήμος) is a Greek surname. Notable people with the surname include:

- Odysseas Vlachodimos (born 1994), German-born Greek footballer, brother of Panagiotis
- Panagiotis Vlachodimos (born 1991), German-born Greek footballer
