= Luca Herrmann =

German footballer

Personal information
- Full name: Luca Valentin Herrmann
- Date of birth: 20 February 1999 (age 27)
- Place of birth: Freiburg im Breisgau, Germany
- Height: 1.76 m (5 ft 9 in)
- Position: Midfielder

Team information
- Current team: Dynamo Dresden
- Number: 8

Youth career
- –2011: PSV Freiburg
- 2011–2017: SC Freiburg

Senior career*
Years	Team	Apps	(Gls)
2017–2021	SC Freiburg II	69	(8)
2021–2024	Dynamo Dresden	49	(2)
2024–2025	SC Paderborn	19	(0)
2025–	Dynamo Dresden	28	(1)

International career^{‡}
2013–2014	Germany U15	4	(0)
2015	Germany U16	3	(0)
2017–2018	Germany U19	2	(2)
- * Club domestic league appearances and goals as of 18 May 2026 ‡ National team caps and goals as of 10:02, 26 July 2021 (UTC)

Luca Valentin Herrmann (born 20 February 1999) is a German professional footballer who plays as a midfielder for 2. Bundesliga club Dynamo Dresden.

== Club career ==
Herrmann was born in Freiburg im Breisgau. After playing youth football for PSV Freiburg, Herrmann switched to SC Freiburg's youth academy in 2011. Having made his senior debut for SC Freiburg II in August 2017, he played 69 times for the reserve side, scoring 8 goals. He signed for Dynamo Dresden on a three-year contract in June 2021.

On 23 May 2024, Herrmann signed with SC Paderborn.

On 24 July 2025, Herrmann returned to Dynamo Dresden.

== International career ==
Herrmann has represented Germany at under-15, under-16 and under-19 levels.

== Career statistics ==
As of match played on 4 May 2024

Appearances and goals by club, season and competition
Club	Season	League			DFB-Pokal		Total	
Club	Season	Division	Apps	Goals	Apps	Goals	Apps	Goals
SC Freiburg II	2017–18	Regionalliga Südwest	9	1	—		9	1
SC Freiburg II	2018–19	Regionalliga Südwest	10	1	—		10	1
SC Freiburg II	2019–20	Regionalliga Südwest	14	1	—		14	1
SC Freiburg II	2020–21	Regionalliga Südwest	36	5	—		36	5
SC Freiburg II	Total		69	8	0	0	69	8
Dynamo Dresden	2021–22	2. Bundesliga	10	0	1	0	11	0
Dynamo Dresden	2022–23	3. Liga	1	0	0	0	1	0
Dynamo Dresden	2023–24	3. Liga	36	2	0	0	36	2
Dynamo Dresden	Total		47	2	1	0	48	2
Career total			116	10	1	0	117	10
