= Ralf Hauptmann =

German footballer

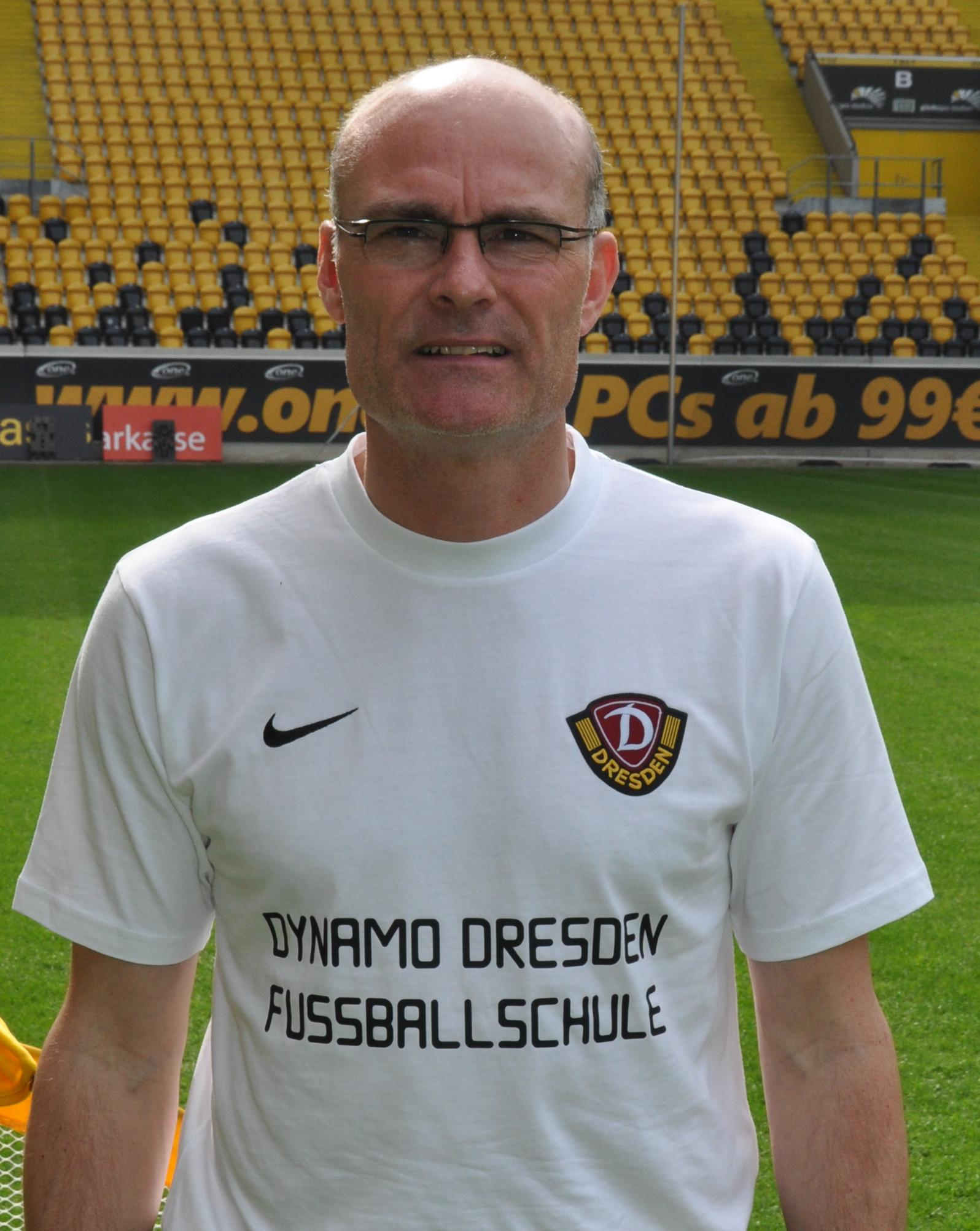

Personal information
- Date of birth: 20 September 1968 (age 58)
- Place of birth: Eberswalde, East Germany
- Height: 1.81 m (5 ft 11 1/2 in)
- Position: Midfielder

Youth career
- Stahl Riesa

Senior career*
Years	Team	Apps	(Gls)
1987–1993	Dynamo Dresden	127	(5)
1993–2001	1. FC Köln	179	(9)
2001–2003	Chemnitzer FC	18	(1)
Total		324	(15)

International career
1989–1990	East Germany	4	(0)
- * Club domestic league appearances and goals

Ralf Hauptmann (born 20 September 1968) is a German former footballer.

== Club career ==
He played 265 top-flight matches in East and unified Germany (10 goals).

== International career ==
Hauptmann won four caps for East Germany.

== Personal life ==
His son, Niklas, currently plays for Dynamo Dresden, while his son Marius plays for FSV Zwickau.
