= Oliver Batista Meier =

German footballer

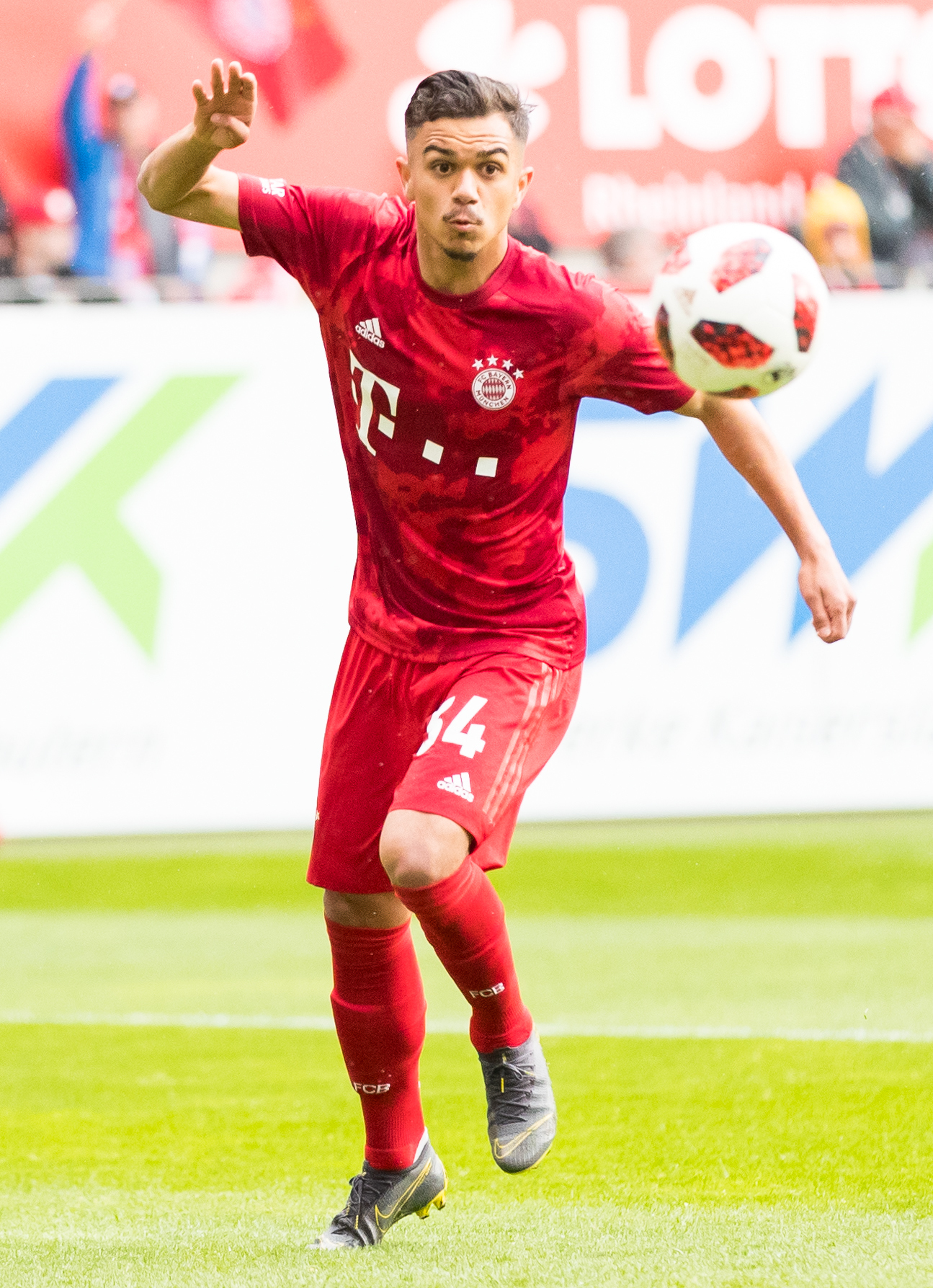
- Batista Meier with Bayern Munich in 2019

Personal information
- Date of birth: 16 February 2001 (age 25)
- Place of birth: Kaiserslautern, Germany
- Height: 1.78 m (5 ft 10 in)
- Position: Winger

Team information
- Current team: SC Paderborn
- Number: 7

Youth career
- SV Wiesenthalerhof
- –2016: 1. FC Kaiserslautern
- 2016–2019: Bayern Munich

Senior career*
Years	Team	Apps	(Gls)
2018–2022	Bayern Munich II	43	(16)
2020–2022	Bayern Munich	1	(0)
2020–2021	→ Heerenveen (loan)	15	(1)
2022–2025	Dynamo Dresden	32	(1)
2023	→ SC Verl (loan)	28	(10)
2024	→ Grasshoppers (loan)	8	(0)
2025	SSV Ulm	15	(3)
2025–2026	Preußen Münster	30	(6)
2026–	SC Paderborn	3	(0)

International career^{‡}
2016	Germany U15	2	(0)
2016–2017	Germany U16	8	(2)
2017–2018	Germany U17	11	(1)
2019	Germany U19	6	(0)
2020	Germany U20	1	(0)
- * Club domestic league appearances and goals as of 10 October 2026 ‡ National team caps and goals as of 7 October 2020

Oliver Batista Meier (born 16 February 2001) is a German professional footballer who plays as a winger for Bundesliga club SC Paderborn.

== Club career ==
Batista Meier made his professional debut for Bayern Munich II in the 3. Liga on 20 July 2019, starting in an away 3–1 loss to Würzburger Kickers. On 30 May 2020, he made his first appearance for the first team, which was also his debut in the Bundesliga, when he replaced Serge Gnabry in the 78th minute of a 5–0 win over Fortuna Düsseldorf, at the Allianz Arena.

On 10 September 2020, Batista Meier joined Eredivisie side Heerenveen on a season-long loan deal with option to buy.

In January 2022, he signed with Dynamo Dresden.

On 11 January 2023, Batista Meier moved to SC Verl on a 1.5-year loan. On 21 December 2023, Dynamo Dresden announced they will terminate the loan early on 1 January 2024.

On 1 February 2024, Batista Meier moved on a new loan to Grasshoppers in Switzerland, with an option to buy. On 19 June 2024, Grasshoppers announced that Batista Meier would depart the club. He had made just eight appearances and started in just two of these. For the final two games of the season, he was not even selected anymore.

On 15 January 2025, Batista Meier joined SSV Ulm on a two-and-a-half-year contract.

On 1 July 2025, Batista Meier signed with Preußen Münster.

On 25 June 2026, Batista Meier moved to Bundesliga newcomers SC Paderborn.

== International career ==
Batista Meier came through the Germany national team youth setups and played at the 2018 UEFA European Under-17 Championship. He received a call up to the Brazil U20s in November 2019, but remains uncapped for his second nation.

== Personal life ==
Batista Meier was born in Kaiserslautern, Rhineland-Palatinate to a German father and Brazilian mother. He grew up speaking both German and Brazilian Portuguese, though he admits that he has since forgotten most of his Portuguese.

== Career statistics ==
=== Club ===
As of 10 October 2026

Appearances and goals by club, season and competition
Club	Season	League			National cup		Europe		Other		Total	
Club	Season	Division	Apps	Goals	Apps	Goals	Apps	Goals	Apps	Goals	Apps	Goals
Bayern Munich II	2018–19	Regionalliga Bayern	1	0	—		—		—		1	0
Bayern Munich II	2019–20	3. Liga	18	4	—		—		—		18	4
Bayern Munich II	2021–22	Regionalliga Bayern	24	12	—		—		—		24	12
Bayern Munich II	Total		43	16	0	0	0	0	0	0	43	16
Bayern Munich	2019–20	Bundesliga	1	0	0	0	0	0	0	0	1	0
Heerenveen (loan)	2020–21	Eredivisie	15	1	0	0	—		—		15	1
Dynamo Dresden	2021–22	2. Bundesliga	13	0	—		—		1 (Note: Appearance in 2. Bundesliga relegation play-offs)	0	14	0
Dynamo Dresden	2022–23	3. Liga	12	1	0	0	—		2 (Note: Appearance(s) in Saxony Cup)	0	14	1
Dynamo Dresden	2022–23	3. Liga	0	0	0	0	—		—		0	0
Dynamo Dresden	2024–25	3. Liga	15	1	2	0	—		1	0	18	1
Dynamo Dresden	Total		40	2	2	0	0	0	4	0	46	2
SC Verl (loan)	2023–24	3. Liga	20	9	—		—		4 (Note: Appearances in Westphalian Cup)	0	24	9
Grasshopper (loan)	2023–24	Swiss Super League	8	0	—		—		—		8	0
SSV Ulm	2024–25	2. Bundesliga	15	3	—		—		—		15	3
Preußen Münster	2025–26	2. Bundesliga	30	6	1	0	—		—		31	6
SC Paderborn	2026–27	Bundesliga	3	0	1	0	—		—		4	0
Career total			175	37	4	0	0	0	8	0	187	37

== Honours ==
Bayern Munich

- Bundesliga: 2019–20
- DFB-Pokal: 2019–20
- UEFA Champions League: 2019–20

Individual

- Fritz Walter Medal U17 Silver: 2018
