= Barne Pernot =

German footballer

Personal information
- Date of birth: 11 June 1999 (age 27)
- Place of birth: Todenbüttel, Germany
- Height: 1.85 m (6 ft 1 in)
- Positions: Defensive midfielder; centre-back

Team information
- Current team: Sturm Graz II
- Number: 31

Youth career
- SV GW Todenbüttel
- –2015: St. Pauli
- 2015–2018: Holstein Kiel

Senior career*
Years	Team	Apps	(Gls)
2018–2020	Holstein Kiel II	48	(3)
2020–2023	SC Verl	56	(2)
2024–2025	Fortuna Köln	24	(0)
2025–	Sturm Graz II	28	(0)
- * Club domestic league appearances and goals as of 17 May 2026

Barne Pernot (pronounced [baʁn pɛʁno]; born 11 June 1999) is a German professional footballer who plays as a defensive midfielder or centre-back for Austrian 2. Liga club Sturm Graz II.

== Career ==
After playing youth football with SV GW Todenbüttel, St. Pauli and Holstein Kiel and senior football with Holstein Kiel II, he signed for SC Verl on a two-year contract in July 2020.
