= Tobias Kraulich =

German footballer (born 1999)

Personal information
- Date of birth: 24 March 1999 (age 27)
- Place of birth: Erfurt, Germany
- Height: 1.91 m (6 ft 3 in)
- Position: Centre-back

Youth career
- –2014: SV Empor Erfurt
- 2014–2017: Rot-Weiß Erfurt

Senior career*
Years	Team	Apps	(Gls)
2017–2018	Rot-Weiß Erfurt	8	(0)
2018–2020	1. FC Nürnberg II	55	(4)
2020–2022	Würzburger Kickers	49	(4)
2022–2023	SV Meppen	26	(1)
2023–2024	Dynamo Dresden	13	(0)
2024–2026	Rot-Weiss Essen	56	(5)
- * Club domestic league appearances and goals as of 20 May 2026

Tobias Kraulich (born 24 March 1999) is a German professional footballer who plays as a centre-back.

== Career ==
After his beginnings in the youth of SV Empor Erfurt, Kraulich moved to the youth department of Rot-Weiß Erfurt in the summer of 2014. There, he also made his professional debut in the 3. Liga, when on 16 March 2018 he was in the starting lineup in the 2–4 away loss to SV Wehen Wiesbaden.

On 10 July 2020, Würzburger Kickers announced that Kraulich had signed a two-year contract with the club.

Kraulich joined 3. Liga club SV Meppen following Würzburger Kickers' relegation to the Regionalliga Bayern in the 2021–22 season. He signed a two-year contract on 29 August 2022.

On 16 June 2023, Kraulich moved to Dynamo Dresden on a one-season deal.

On 31 May 2024, Kraulich signed with Rot-Weiss Essen. He left the club in summer 2026 after his expiring contract was not renewed.
