= Panagiotis Vlachodimos =

Greek footballer

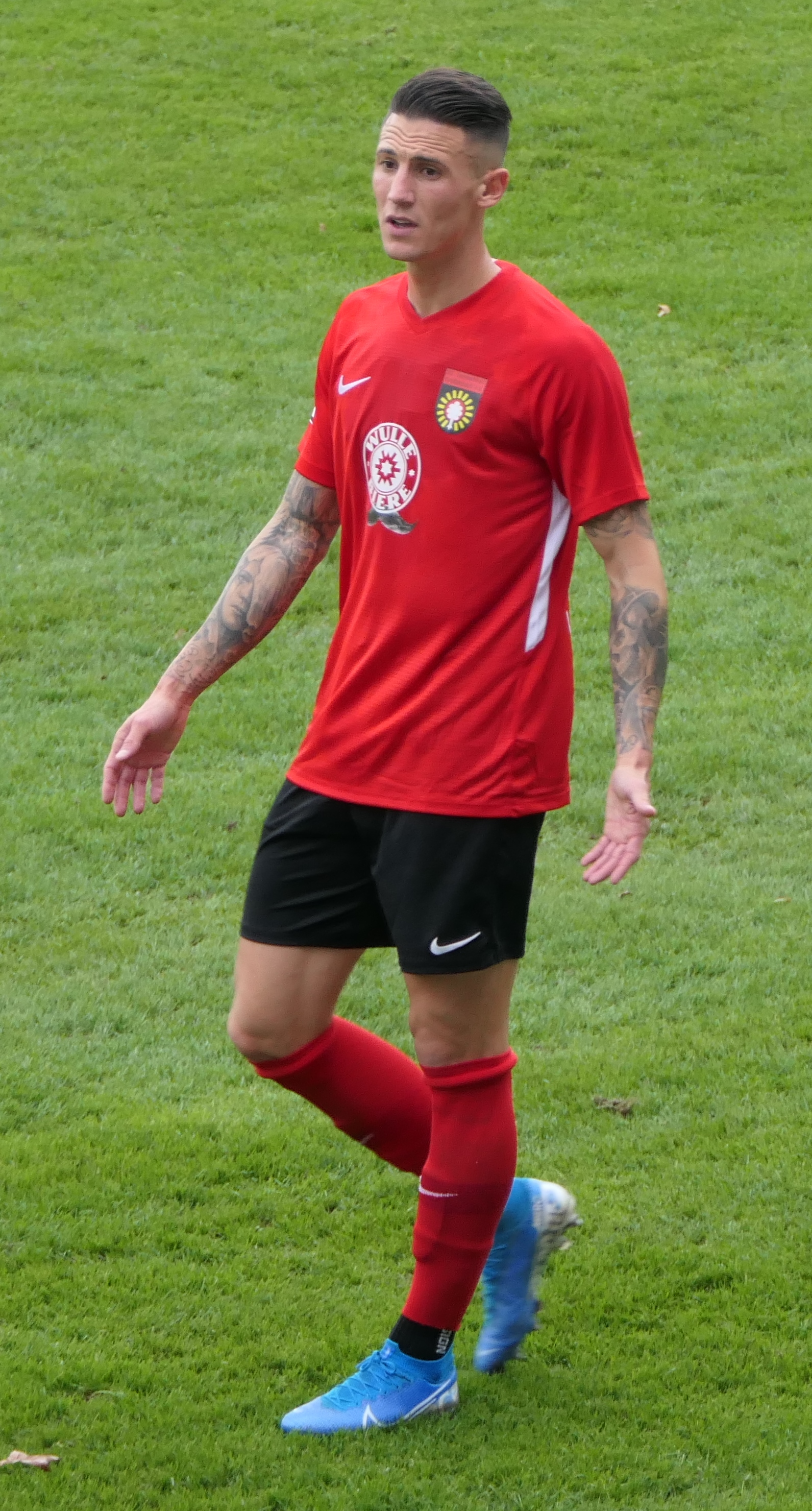
- Vlachodimos with Sonnenhof Großaspach in 2019

Personal information
- Date of birth: 12 October 1991 (age 35)
- Place of birth: Stuttgart, Germany
- Height: 1.84 m (6 ft 0 in)
- Position: Winger

Youth career
- –2001: VfL Wangen
- 2001–2010: VfB Stuttgart

Senior career*
Years	Team	Apps	(Gls)
2010–2011	VfB Stuttgart II	8	(0)
2011–2012	Skoda Xanthi	27	(3)
2012–2015	Olympiacos	12	(2)
2013	→ FC Augsburg (loan)	1	(0)
2014	→ Platanias (loan)	14	(5)
2014	→ Ergotelis (loan)	4	(0)
2015	→ Nîmes (loan)	12	(2)
2016–2017	Panathinaikos	24	(1)
2017–2019	Nîmes	23	(4)
2017–2019	Nîmes B	9	(1)
2019–2020	Sonnenhof Großaspach	29	(5)
2020–2024	Dynamo Dresden	39	(5)
Total		202	(28)

International career
2009–2010	Greece U19	7	(3)
2011–2012	Greece U21	7	(1)
- * Club domestic league appearances and goals as of 22 May 2024

Panagiotis Vlachodimos (Greek: Παναγιώτης Βλαχοδήμος; born 12 October 1991) is a former professional footballer who played as a winger. Born in Germany, he has represented Greece at youth level.

== Club career ==
=== Early career ===
Vlachodimos started his career with local club VfL Stuttgart-Wangen. He later joined VfB Stuttgart in 2001. He was promoted to the reserve team in 2010.

On 20 June 2011, Vlachodimos moved to Super League Greece club Skoda Xanthi. He made his debut for the club on 28 August 2011 against PAOK. He scored his first goal against Panathinaikos, his next goal came against Olympiacos in a stunning 1–0 victory against the Greek giants, he scored his third and final goal of the season against PAS Giannina. For his efforts during the season, he won the best young player award for the 2011–12 season.

On 23 May 2012, Vlachodimos signed a five-year contract with Greek side Olympiacos for a transfer fee of €400,000. He made his debut on 20 October 2012 against his former club Skoda Xanthi in a 4–0 home win. In a Greek Cup match against Panachaiki, Vlachodimos assisted Kostas Mitroglou's goal in a 2–0 home win. On 14 February 2013, he also made his European debut against Levante in a 3–0 away loss. In the second leg against Levante of the Europa League, Vlachodimos made an impressive performance but it was not enough to save Olympiakos from being knocked out on a 4–0 aggregate. Three days later, Vlachodimos assisted Giannis Maniatis's goal in a 2–1 win over Aris on 24 February. His first goal came one week later in Olympiakos's 4–0 away win over OFI. He also managed to score against Platanias in a 4–0 away win.

On 6 July 2013, Vlachodimos joined Bundesliga side FC Augsburg on a season–long loan. He made his first and only appearance for Augsburg on 10 August 2013 against Borussia Dortmund. At the end of the year, the club cancelled his loan and he returned to Greece. In January 2014 he signed for Platanias on loan from Olympiacos until the end of the season.

On 2 February 2015, Vlachodimos joined French Ligue 2 side Nîmes Olympique for the rest of the 2014–15 season. On 30 August 2015, after having returned to Olympiacos, his contract was dissolved and Vlachodimos became a free agent.

=== Panathinaikos ===
On 5 January 2016, it was announced that Panathinaikos had a deal with Vlachodimos, who was released by Olympiacos the previous summer and had been training with Greuther Fürth and Arminia Bielefeld. Eventually, on 6 January 2016, he signed with "The Greens".

On 30 January 2016, despite the probable legal actions for the signing of the player from Olympiacos, he was included in Panathinaikos' squad for the league away match against Platanias. Eventually, on 10 February 2016, he made his debut with the club in a 1–0 away loss against Atromitos for the Greek Cup coming in as a late substitute. On 14 February 2016 he made his debut in the Super League, opening the score in a 3–0 away win against PAS Giannina.

=== Return to Nîmes and Germany ===
On 10 July 2017, Vlachodimos signed for French Ligue 2 side Nîmes Olympique on a three-year contract, after not being in the plans of Panathinaikos coach Marinos Ouzounidis. On 27 August 2017, he scored his first goal with the club sealing a 1–0 home win game against Le Havre AC. At the end of the season, he returned to Ligue 1, for the first time since the 1992–93 season after finishing second in Ligue 2.

On 23 August 2019, Vlachodimos joined Sonnenhof Großaspach on a two-year deal.

=== Dynamo Dresden ===
On 15 July 2020, signed a two years contract with German club Dynamo Dresden for an undisclosed fee. On 1 May 2021 he scored against Uerdingen 05 in 3. Liga in the season 2020–21 at the Grotenburg-Stadion. On 16 May 2021 he scored against Türkgücü München at the Rudolf-Harbig-Stadion in 3. Liga in the season 2020–21. With Dynamo Dresden won the 3. Liga in the season 2020–21 and got promoted 2. Bundesliga.

On 19 September 2021, Panagiotis Vlachodimos during 2. Bundesliga's match against Darmstadt suffered a ruptured anterior cruciate ligament in his left knee and will need to be out of action for at least six months, with the player expected to undergo immediate surgery to repair the problem.

== International career ==
Vlachodimos decided to represent Greece, the country of his origin, from youth level. He has played for the under-19 team and the under-21 team.

== Personal life ==
Panagiotis is the older brother of Odysseas, who plays for Spanish side Sevilla on loan from Newcastle United.

== Career statistics ==
As of match played 4 April 2026

Appearances and goals by club, season and competition
Club	Season	League			Cup		Other		Total	
Club	Season	Division	Apps	Goals	Apps	Goals	Apps	Goals	Apps	Goals
VfB Stuttgart II	2009–10	3. Liga	1	0	—		—		1	0
VfB Stuttgart II	2010–11	3. Liga	7	0	—		—		7	0
VfB Stuttgart II	Total		8	0	—		—		8	0
Skoda Xanthi	2011–12	Super League Greece	27	3	0	0	—		27	3
Olympiacos	2012–13	Super League Greece	12	2	0	0	2 (Note: Appearances in the UEFA Europa League.)	0	14	2
FC Augsburg (loan)	2013–14	Bundesliga	1	0	0	0	—		1	0
FC Augsburg II (loan)	2013–14	Regionalliga Bayern	2	0	—		—		2	0
Platanias (loan)	2013–14	Super League Greece	14	5	0	0	—		14	5
Ergotelis (loan)	2014–15	Super League Greece	4	0	0	0	—		4	0
Nîmes (loan)	2014–15	Ligue 2	12	2	0	0	—		12	2
Panathinaikos	2015–16	Super League Greece	5	1	1	0	3 (Note: Appearances in the Super League Greece playoff.)	0	9	1
Panathinaikos	2016–17	Super League Greece	14	0	3	0	2	0	19	0
Panathinaikos	Total		19	1	4	0	5	0	28	0
Nîmes (loan)	2017–18	Ligue 2	23	4	0	0	1 (Note: Appearances in the French League Cup.)	0	24	4
Sonnenhof Großaspach	2019–20	3. Liga	29	5	—		—		29	5
Dynamo Dresden	2020–21	3. Liga	15	2	1	0	—		16	2
Dynamo Dresden	2021–22	2. Bundesliga	9	1	1	0	2 (Note: Appearances in the 2. Bundesliga relegation playoff.)	0	12	1
Dynamo Dresden	2022–23	3. Liga	5	0	1	0	—		6	0
Dynamo Dresden	2023–24	3. Liga	10	2	3	2	—		13	4
Dynamo Dresden	Total		39	5	6	2	2	0	47	7
Career total			190	27	10	2	10	0	210	29

== Honours ==
Olympiacos

- Super League Greece: 2012–13
- Greek Cup: 2012–13

Nîmes

- Ligue 2: 2017–18

Dynamo Dresden

- 3. Liga: 2020–21

Individual

- Greek Young Footballer of the year: 2012
