= Tom Baack =

German footballer

Personal information
- Date of birth: 13 March 1999 (age 27)
- Place of birth: Essen, Germany
- Height: 1.80 m (5 ft 11 in)
- Position: Centre-back

Team information
- Current team: SC Paderborn
- Number: 6

Youth career
- –2006: SV Leithe
- 2006–2018: VfL Bochum

Senior career*
Years	Team	Apps	(Gls)
2015–2019	VfL Bochum	4	(0)
2019–2022	Jahn Regensburg	5	(1)
2021–2022	→ SC Verl (loan)	31	(0)
2022–2025	SC Verl	97	(5)
2025–2026	1. FC Nürnberg	20	(1)
2026–	SC Paderborn	5	(0)

International career
2014–2015	Germany U16	10	(0)
2015–2016	Germany U17	13	(0)
2017	Germany U18	2	(0)
2017–2018	Germany U19	8	(0)
2018–2019	Germany U20	8	(0)
- * Club domestic league appearances and goals as of 31 October 2026

Tom Baack (born 13 March 1999) is a German professional footballer who plays as a centre-back for Bundesliga club SC Paderborn.

== Career ==
Baack made his professional debut for VfL Bochum on 5 October 2018 in the 2. Bundesliga, coming on as a substitute in the 90+4th minute for Tom Weilandt in the 1–0 home win against Arminia Bielefeld.

On 28 May 2025, Baack signed with 1. FC Nürnberg.

On 27 May 2026, Baack agreed to join SC Paderborn in Bundesliga.

== Career statistics ==
As of 31 October 2026

Appearances and goals by club, season and competition
Club	Season	League			DFB-Pokal		Other		Total	
Club	Season	Division	Apps	Goals	Apps	Goals	Apps	Goals	Apps	Goals
VfL Bochum	2015–16	2. Bundesliga	0	0	0	0	—		0	0
VfL Bochum	2016–17	2. Bundesliga	0	0	0	0	—		0	0
VfL Bochum	2017–18	2. Bundesliga	0	0	0	0	—		0	0
VfL Bochum	2018–19	2. Bundesliga	4	0	0	0	—		4	0
VfL Bochum	Total		4	0	0	0	—		4	0
Jahn Regensburg	2019–20	2. Bundesliga	4	1	0	0	—		4	1
Jahn Regensburg	2020–21	2. Bundesliga	1	0	0	0	—		1	0
Jahn Regensburg	Total		5	1	0	0	—		5	1
SC Verl (loan)	2021–22	3. Liga	31	0	—		3 (Note: Appearance(s) in Westphalian Cup)	1	34	1
SC Verl	2022–23	3. Liga	30	2	—		1	0	31	2
SC Verl	2023–24	3. Liga	36	1	—		6	0	42	1
SC Verl	2024–25	3. Liga	31	2	—		3	1	34	3
SC Verl	Total		97	5	—		10	1	107	6
1. FC Nürnberg	2025–26	2. Bundesliga	20	1	0	0	—		20	1
SC Padeborn	2026–27	Bundesliga	5	0	1	0	—		6	0
Career total			162	6	1	0	13	2	176	9
