= Felix Hagmann =

German footballer (born 2004

Personal information
- Date of birth: 29 January 2004 (age 22)
- Place of birth: Bietigheim-Bissingen, Germany
- Height: 1.78 m (5 ft 10 in)
- Position: Defender

Team information
- Current team: Arminia Bielefeld
- Number: 2

Youth career
- –2016: FV Markgröningen
- 2016–2023: TSG 1899 Hoffenheim

Senior career*
Years	Team	Apps	(Gls)
2022–2024	TSG 1899 Hoffenheim II	66	(1)
2024–	Arminia Bielefeld	38	(1)
- * Club domestic league appearances and goals as of 18 May 2026

Felix Hagmann (born 29 January 2004) is a German professional footballer who plays as a defender for Arminia Bielefeld.

== Early life ==
Hagmann was born on 29 January 2004 in Bietigheim-Bissingen, Germany. A native of the city, he is the brother of Max Hagmann.

== Career ==
As a youth player, Hagmann joined the youth academy of FV Markgröningen. In 2016, he joined the youth academy of Bundesliga side TSG 1899 Hoffenheim and was promoted to the club's reserve team in 2022, where he made sixty-six league appearances and scored one goal.

During the summer of 2024, he signed for Arminia Bielefeld, helping the club achieve promotion from the third tier to the second tier. On 15 September 2024, he debuted for them during a 3–1 away win over FC Erzgebirge Aue in the league. On 11 March 2025, he scored his first goal for them during a 3–1 home win over 1. FC Saarbrücken in the league.
