= Julian Stark =

German footballer (born 2001)

Personal information
- Date of birth: 8 March 2001 (age 25)
- Place of birth: Überlingen, Germany
- Height: 1.83 m (6 ft 0 in)
- Position: Central midfielder

Team information
- Current team: Vaduz
- Number: 17

Youth career
- FC Beuren-Weildorf
- –2017: FC 03 Radolfzell
- 2017–2020: 1. FC Heidenheim

Senior career*
Years	Team	Apps	(Gls)
2020–2022	1. FC Heidenheim	3	(0)
2022–2024	SC Freiburg II	61	(6)
2024–2026	SC Verl	65	(8)
2026–	Vaduz	9	(2)
- * Club domestic league appearances and goals as of 28 September 2026

Julian Stark (born 8 March 2001) is a German professional footballer who plays as a central midfielder for Liechtensteiner club Vaduz of the Swiss Super League.

== Career ==
Stark began his youth career with FC Beuren-Weildorf and FC 03 Radolfzell, before joining the academy of 1. FC Heidenheim in 2017. In June 2020, he signed his first professional contract with Heidenheim. He made his debut for the club in the 2. Bundesliga on 18 April 2021, coming on as a substitute in 86th minute for Tim Kleindienst against Jahn Regensburg. The away match finished as a 3–0 win for Heidenheim.

For the 2022–23 season, Stark moved to SC Freiburg II in 3. Liga.

On 13 July 2024, Stark signed with SC Verl.

On 15 July 2026, Stark joined Vaduz in Swiss Super League on a one-season contract.

== Personal life ==
Stark was born in Überlingen, and grew up in the Beuren district of Salem, Baden-Württemberg.
