= Marius Hauptmann =

German footballer (born 1999)

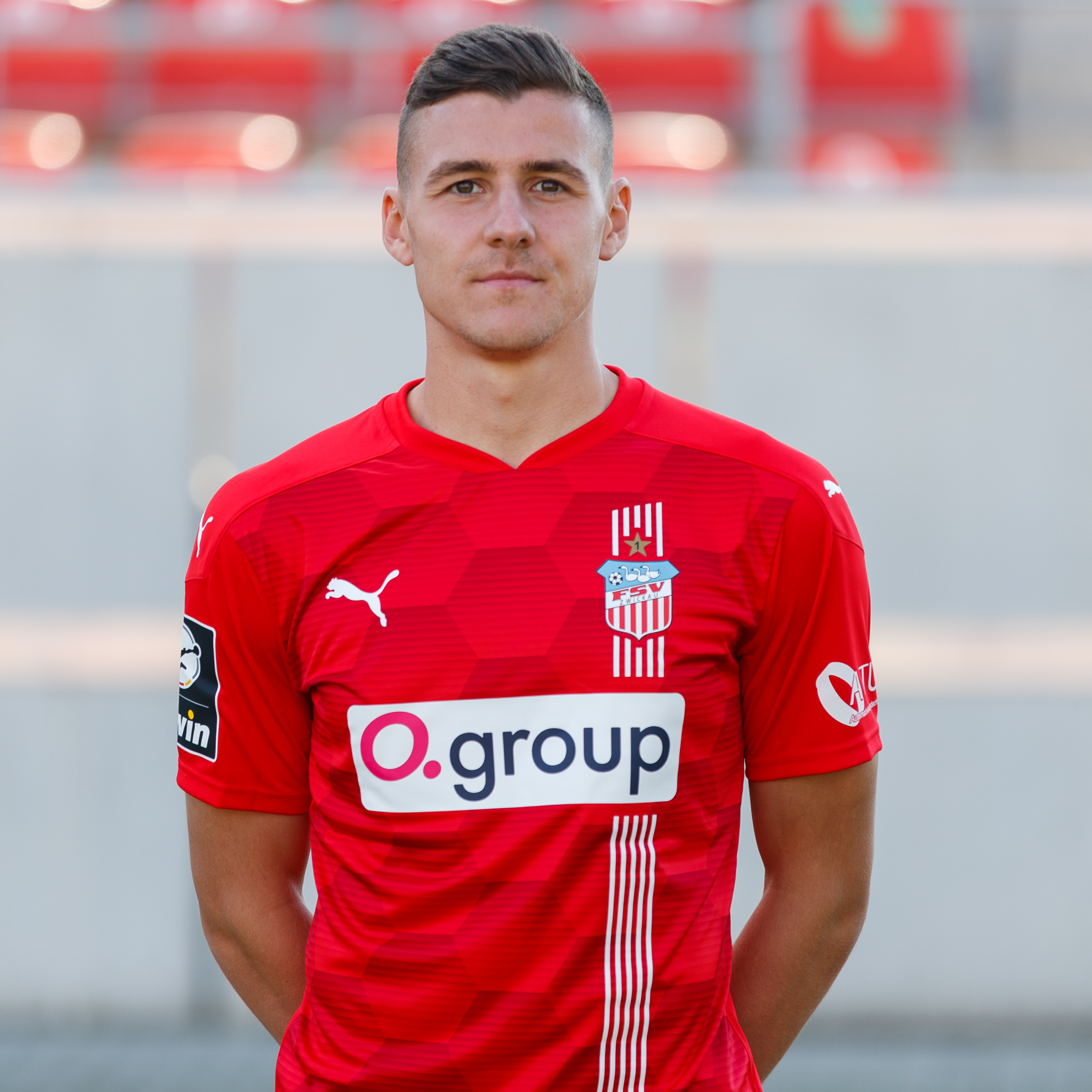
- Hauptmann with FSV Zwickau in 2021

Personal information
- Date of birth: 14 September 1999 (age 27)
- Place of birth: Leinefelde, Germany
- Height: 1.78 m (5 ft 10 in)
- Position: Winger

Team information
- Current team: Hallescher FC
- Number: 23

Youth career
- –2013: Borea Dresden
- 2013–2018: Dynamo Dresden

Senior career*
Years	Team	Apps	(Gls)
2018–2019	Dynamo Dresden	1	(0)
2019–2022	FSV Zwickau	64	(4)
2022–2024	VfB Lübeck	67	(8)
2024–	Hallescher FC	73	(3)
- * Club domestic league appearances and goals as of 23 September 2026

Marius Hauptmann (born 14 September 1999) is a German professional footballer who plays as a winger for Hallescher FC.

== Career ==
Hauptmann made his professional debut for Dynamo Dresden in the 2. Bundesliga on 23 December 2018, coming on as a substitute in the 90+3rd minute for Moussa Koné in the 3–1 away win against MSV Duisburg.

On 5 June 2019, Hauptmann joined FSV Zwickau on a two-year contract.

== Personal life ==
Hauptmann's father, Ralf, is a former professional footballer and East German international, who also played for Dynamo Dresden. His older brother Niklas is also a professional footballer, having previously played for Dynamo Dresden.
