= Tom Müller =

German footballer (born 1997)

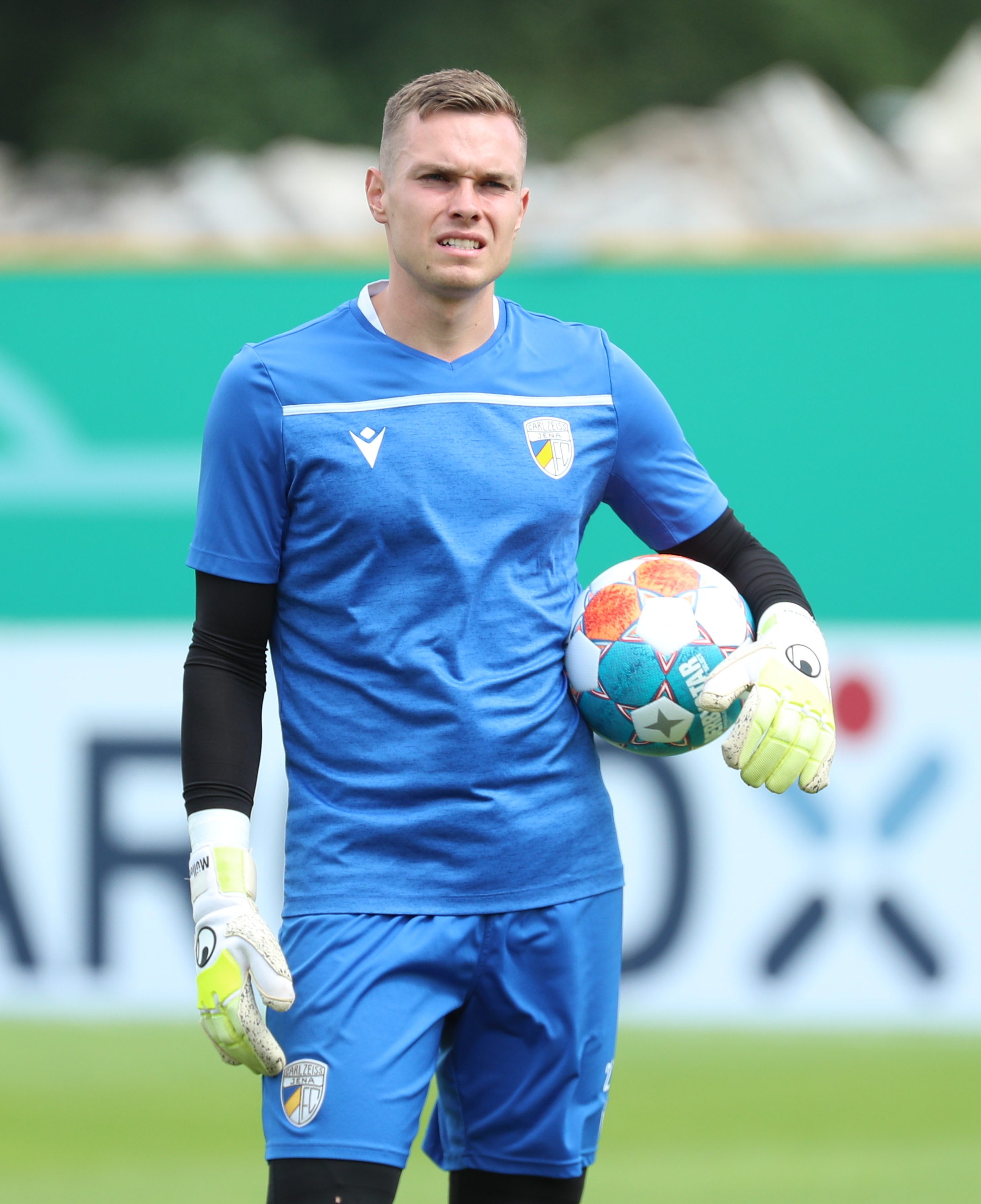
- Müller in 2021

Personal information
- Date of birth: 27 November 1997 (age 28)
- Place of birth: Dessau, Germany
- Height: 1.88 m (6 ft 2 in)
- Position: Goalkeeper

Team information
- Current team: Hallescher FC
- Number: 27

Youth career
- SG Empor Waldersee
- –2009: SV Dessau 05
- 2009–2015: Hallescher FC

Senior career*
Years	Team	Apps	(Gls)
2015–2021	Hallescher FC	24	(1)
2021–2022	Carl Zeiss Jena	22	(0)
2022–2023	Preußen Münster	5	(0)
2023–2024	SC Verl	6	(0)
2024–	Hallescher FC	0	(0)
- * Club domestic league appearances and goals as of 1 January 2025

Tom Müller (born 27 November 1997) is a German professional footballer who plays as a goalkeeper for Hallescher FC. He has previously played for Hallescher FC, Carl Zeiss Jena, Preußen Münster and SC Verl.

== Club career ==
Born in Dessau, Müller played youth football for SG Empor Waldersee and SV Dessau 05 before joining Hallescher FC's academy in 2009. In summer 2015, Müller signed his first professional contract with the club until summer 2018. He made his debut for the club on 1 August 2017 as a 63rd-minute substitute for injured goalkeeper Oliver Schnitzler in a 2–0 defeat to Carl Zeiss Jena. In October 2017, having saved a penalty earlier in the match, Müller headed in a 95th-minute equaliser in the club's 1–1 draw with Rot-Weiss Erfurt, becoming the fourth goalkeeper to score in the 3. Liga. He made 22 appearances in total during the 2017–18 3. Liga. In April 2018, Halle took up the option to extend Müller's contract by a year to summer 2019. Having failed to make an appearance during the following season, his contract at Halle was extended by two years to summer 2021 in April 2019. He played twice during the 2019–20 season and failed to appear during the following season.

Müller joined Regionalliga Nordost club Carl Zeiss Jena on a one-year contract in summer 2021. He made 22 appearances during the 2021–22 season. In June 2022, Müller signed for Regionalliga West club Preußen Münster, where he was part of the team reaching promotion to the 3. Liga in 2023. On 1 September 2023, his contract with Preußen Münster was terminated by mutual consent.

On 4 September 2023, Müller signed with SC Verl.

On 15 October 2024, Müller returned to Hallescher FC.

== International career ==
Müller was called up to the Germany under-18 squad in 2014.

== Honours ==
Preußen Münster

- Regionalliga West: 2022–23
