= Sascha Risch =

German footballer

Personal information
- Date of birth: 13 April 2000 (age 26)
- Place of birth: Emmendingen, Germany
- Height: 1.75 m (5 ft 9 in)
- Position: Left-back

Team information
- Current team: Fortuna Düsseldorf
- Number: 28

Youth career
- –2010: Riegeler SC
- 2010–2019: SC Freiburg

Senior career*
Years	Team	Apps	(Gls)
2019–2022	SC Freiburg II	36	(1)
2022–2023	SV Meppen	32	(4)
2023–2024	SSV Ulm	7	(0)
2024–2026	Dynamo Dresden	35	(0)
2026–	Fortuna Düsseldorf	0	(0)
- * Club domestic league appearances and goals as of 18 May 2026

Sascha Risch (born 13 April 2000) is a German professional footballer who plays as a left-back for 3. Liga club Fortuna Düsseldorf.

== Club career ==
On 29 August 2024, Risch moved to Dynamo Dresden.

On 18 June 2026, Risch signed a two-year contract with Fortuna Düsseldorf.

== Career statistics ==
As of 1 July 2022

Appearances and goals by club, season and competition
Club	Season	League			Cup		Continental		Other		Total	
Club	Season	Division	Apps	Goals	Apps	Goals	Apps	Goals	Apps	Goals	Apps	Goals
SC Freiburg II	2020–21	Regionalliga	8	1	–		–		0	0	8	1
SC Freiburg II	2021–22	3. Liga	28	0	–		–		0	0	28	0
SC Freiburg II	Total		36	1	0	0	0	0	0	0	36	1
Career total			36	1	0	0	0	0	0	0	36	1
