= Park Kyu-hyun =

South Korean footballer (born 2001)

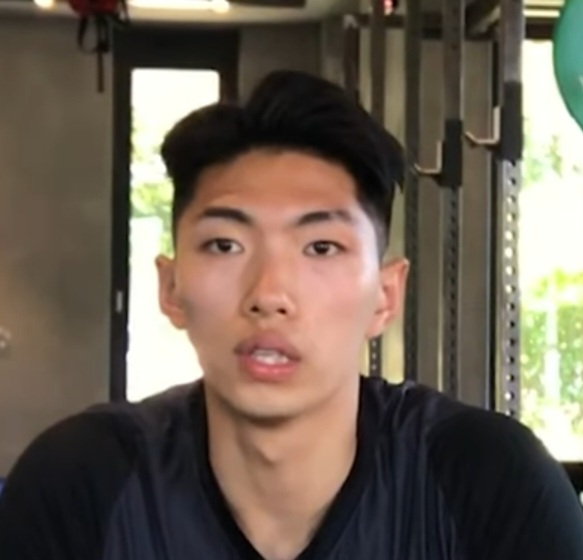

Personal information
- Date of birth: 14 April 2001 (age 25)
- Place of birth: Seosan, Chungnam, South Korea
- Height: 1.83 m (6 ft 0 in)
- Position: Left-back

Team information
- Current team: Daejeon Hana Citizen
- Number: 2

Youth career
- –2019: Ulsan

Senior career*
Years	Team	Apps	(Gls)
2019–2023	Werder Bremen	0	(0)
2019–2022	→ Werder Bremen II (loan)	24	(1)
2022–2023	→ Dynamo Dresden (loan)	16	(0)
2023–2024	Dynamo Dresden	19	(0)
2025–	Daejeon Hana Citizen	20	(0)

International career^{‡}
2016-2018	South Korea U17	10	(0)
2019	South Korea U20	3	(0)
2022–	South Korea U23	7	(0)
2023–	South Korea	2	(0)
Medal record
Men's football
Representing South Korea
Asian Games
Gold medal – first place	2022 Hangzhou	Team
- * Club domestic league appearances and goals as of 3 August 2026 ‡ National team caps and goals as of 7 October 2023 (UTC)

Park Kyu-hyun (Korean: 박규현; born 14 April 2001) is a South Korean professional footballer who plays as a left-back for K League 1 club Daejeon Hana Citizen.

== Career ==
Park started his career with German Bundesliga side Werder Bremen. In 2022, he was sent on loan to Dynamo Dresden in the German third tier. On 23 July 2022, Park debuted for Dynamo Dresden during a 4–3 loss to 1860 Munich.

On 2 June 2023, Park signed for Dynamo Dresden on a permanent basis on a three-year deal.

On 16 December 2024, Dynamo Dresden announced Park's departure for Daejeon Hana Citizen, effective 1 January 2025.

== Career statistics ==
=== Club ===
As of match played 11 May 2024

Appearances and goals by club, season and competition
Club	Season	League			National cup		Continental		Other		Total	
Club	Season	Division	Apps	Goals	Apps	Goals	Apps	Goals	Apps	Goals	Apps	Goals
Werder Bremen II	2019–20	Regionalliga Nord	3	0	—		—		—		3	0
Werder Bremen II	2020–21	Regionalliga Nord	8	0	—		—		—		8	0
Werder Bremen II	2021–22	Regionalliga Nord	13	1	—		—		—		13	1
Werder Bremen II	Total		24	1	0	0	0	0	6	0	30	1
Dynamo Dresden (loan)	2022–23	3. Liga	16	0	1	0	—		—		17	0
Dynamo Dresden	2023–24	3. Liga	19	0	2	0	—		—		21	0
Career total			59	1	3	0	0	0	6	0	68	1

== Honours ==
South Korea U23

- Asian Games: 2022
