= Lars Bünning =

German footballer (born 1998)

Personal information
- Date of birth: 27 February 1998 (age 28)
- Place of birth: Hamburg, Germany
- Height: 1.87 m (6 ft 2 in)
- Position: Centre-back

Team information
- Current team: Dynamo Dresden
- Number: 23

Youth career
- 2014–2015: JFV A/O Heeslingen
- 2015–2017: Werder Bremen

Senior career*
Years	Team	Apps	(Gls)
2017–2019	Werder Bremen II	31	(0)
2019–2020	Borussia Dortmund II	18	(1)
2020–2022	SV Meppen	66	(4)
2022–2023	1. FC Kaiserslautern	4	(0)
2023–	Dynamo Dresden	73	(2)
- * Club domestic league appearances and goals as of 18 May 2026

Lars Bünning (born 27 February 1998) is a German professional footballer who plays as a centre-back for 2. Bundesliga club Dynamo Dresden.

== Career ==
A Werder Bremen youth product, Bünning made his senior debut with the club's reserves and played in the 3. Liga.

In July 2020, after a season with Borussia Dortmund II in the Regionalliga West, he joined 3. Liga side SV Meppen.

On 16 August 2023, Bünning signed a two-year contract with Dynamo Dresden.
