= Jakob Lewald =

German footballer

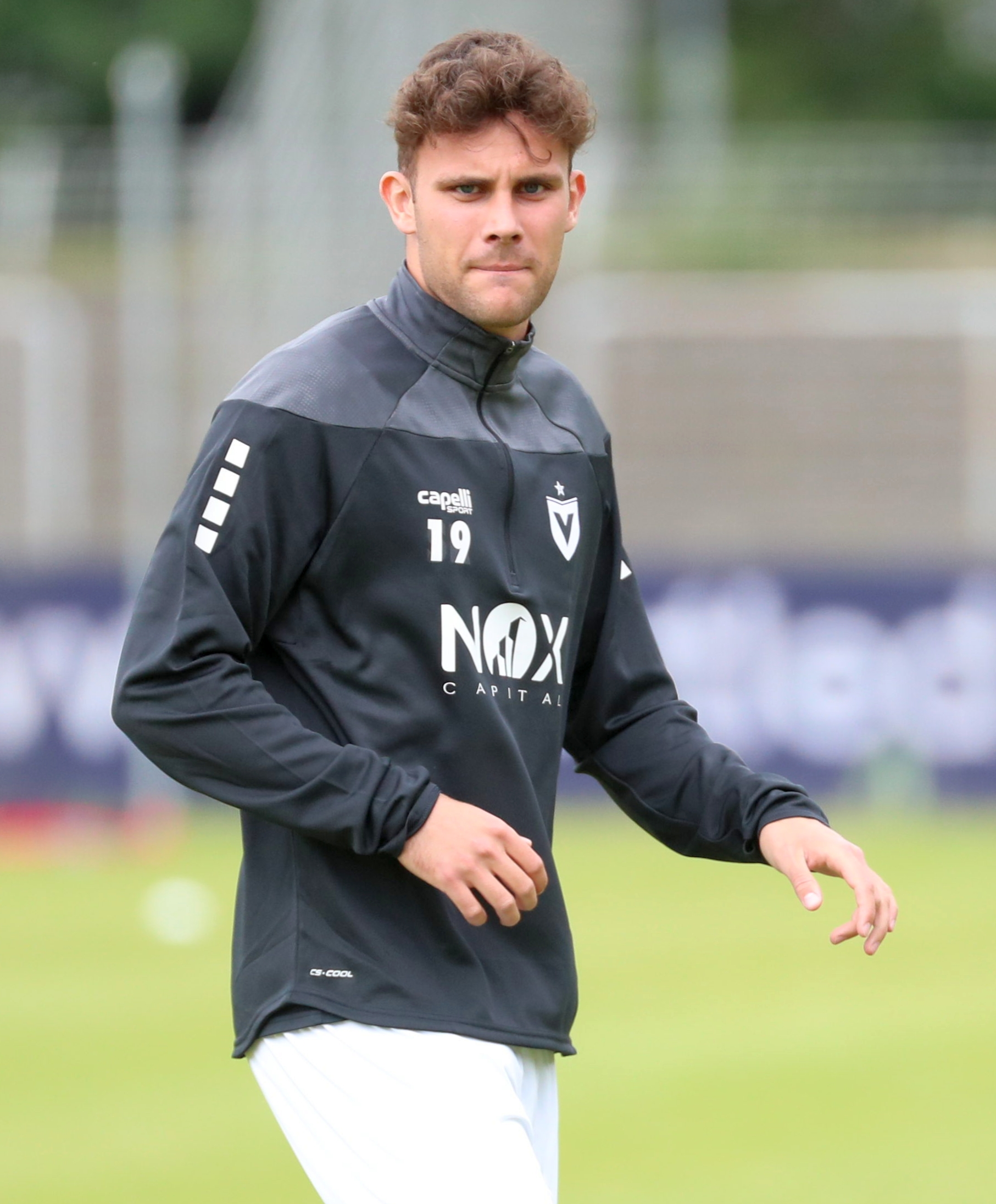
- Lewald with Viktoria Berlin in 2022

Personal information
- Date of birth: 26 February 1999 (age 27)
- Place of birth: Bremen, Germany
- Height: 1.94 m (6 ft 4 in)
- Position: Defender

Team information
- Current team: Kickers Offenbach
- Number: 4

Youth career
- –2007: SC Weyhe
- 2007–2018: Werder Bremen

Senior career*
Years	Team	Apps	(Gls)
2018–2020	Schwarz-Weiß Rehden	48	(5)
2020–2022	Viktoria Berlin	47	(2)
2022–2024	Dynamo Dresden	64	(0)
2024–2025	SV Sandhausen	32	(2)
2025–2026	Wehen Wiesbaden	13	(0)
2026–	Kickers Offenbach	5	(0)
- * Club domestic league appearances and goals as of 24 September 2026

Jakob Lewald (born 26 February 1999) is a German professional footballer who plays as a defender for Kickers Offenbach.

Having played youth football for Werder Bremen, Lewald started his senior career for Schwarz-Weiß Rehden in 2018, before signing for Viktoria Berlin two years later. Viktoria Berlin were promoted to the 3. Liga and subsequently relegated in his two seasons at the club, before Lewald signed for Dynamo Dresden in August 2022.

== Career ==
Born in Bremen, Lewald grew up in Barrien, Lower Saxony. He played youth football at SC Weyhe before joining Werder Bremen in 2007. Having been captain of Werder Bremen's under-19 team and on the verge of joining the reserve side, Lewald left the club, signing for Schwarz-Weiß Rehden of the Regionalliga Nord in summer 2018. In his debut season for the club, he started 27 of a possible 34 games, as Rehden finished 8th on 47 points. His performances for Rehden attracted the interest of a number of second, third and fourth tier clubs in the winter 2020 transfer window, though Lewald stayed at Rehden for the duration of the 2019–20 season, scoring 4 goals in 21 appearances.

In May 2020, it was announced that Lewald would sign for Regionalliga Nordost side Viktoria Berlin, reuniting with former Rehden manager Benedetto Muzzicato. This was Viktoria Berlin having been unsuccessful in their attempts to sign Lewald in the previous two transfer windows. On 11 February 2021, it was announced that Lewald had extended his contract with Viktoria until summer 2022. Lewald made 10 appearances for Viktoria Berlin, before the Regionalliga Nordost season was paused due to the COVID-19 pandemic in November. In March 2021, clubs voted unanimously to abandon the Regionalliga season, and thus Viktoria Berlin were promoted to the 3. Liga as champions after 11 wins from 11 matches.

Lewald made his 3. Liga debut on 25 July 2021, starting in a 2–1 win at home to Viktoria Köln in the opening game of the season. He scored his first goal for the club in the reverse fixture as they won 4–1 on 17 December 2021. After making his 20th appearance of the season in a 2–0 defeat to 1. FC Kaiserslautern on 22 January 2022, his contract was extended until summer 2023, as per the contract extension clause his contract. He made 35 appearances during the 2021–22 season, scoring twice, as the club were relegated after finishing 17th.

On 22 August 2022, it was announced that Lewald had signed for 3. Liga club Dynamo Dresden on a two-year contract, for an undisclosed fee. He made 27 league appearances across the 2022–23 season.

On 5 June 2024, Lewald joined fellow 3. Liga club SV Sandhausen.

On 13 August 2025, Lewald signed a two-season contract with Wehen Wiesbaden, also in 3. Liga.
