= Jakob Lemmer =

German footballer (born 2000)

Personal information
- Date of birth: 26 April 2000 (age 26)
- Place of birth: Gießen, Germany
- Height: 1.79 m (5 ft 10 in)
- Position: Right midfielder

Team information
- Current team: Dynamo Dresden
- Number: 10

Youth career
- –2016: Eintracht Frankfurt
- 2016–2019: Kickers Offenbach

Senior career*
Years	Team	Apps	(Gls)
2019–2023	Kickers Offenbach	55	(13)
2021–2022	→ Rot-Weiß Koblenz (loan)	35	(6)
2023–	Dynamo Dresden	126	(23)
- * Club domestic league appearances and goals as of 18 May 2026

Jakob Lemmer (born 26 April 2000) is a German professional footballer who plays as a right midfielder for 2. Bundesliga side Dynamo Dresden.

== Career ==
Born in Giessen, Lemmer played youth football for Eintracht Frankfurt before moving to Kickers Offenbach at the age of 16. He signed his first professional contract in the 2019–20 season. He spent the 2021–22 season on loan at Regionalliga West rivals Rot-Weiß Koblenz, scoring 6 goals and making 6 assists in 35 appearances. During the 2022–23 season, he became an undisputed starter for Kickers Offenbach, scoring 9 goals and making 4 assists in 22 appearances.

In January 2023, Lemmer joined 3. Liga side Dynamo Dresden. With half a year left on Lemmer's contract with Kickers Offenbach, Dynamo Dresden paid an undisclosed transfer fee.
