= Sportclub Arena =

Football stadium in Verl, Germany

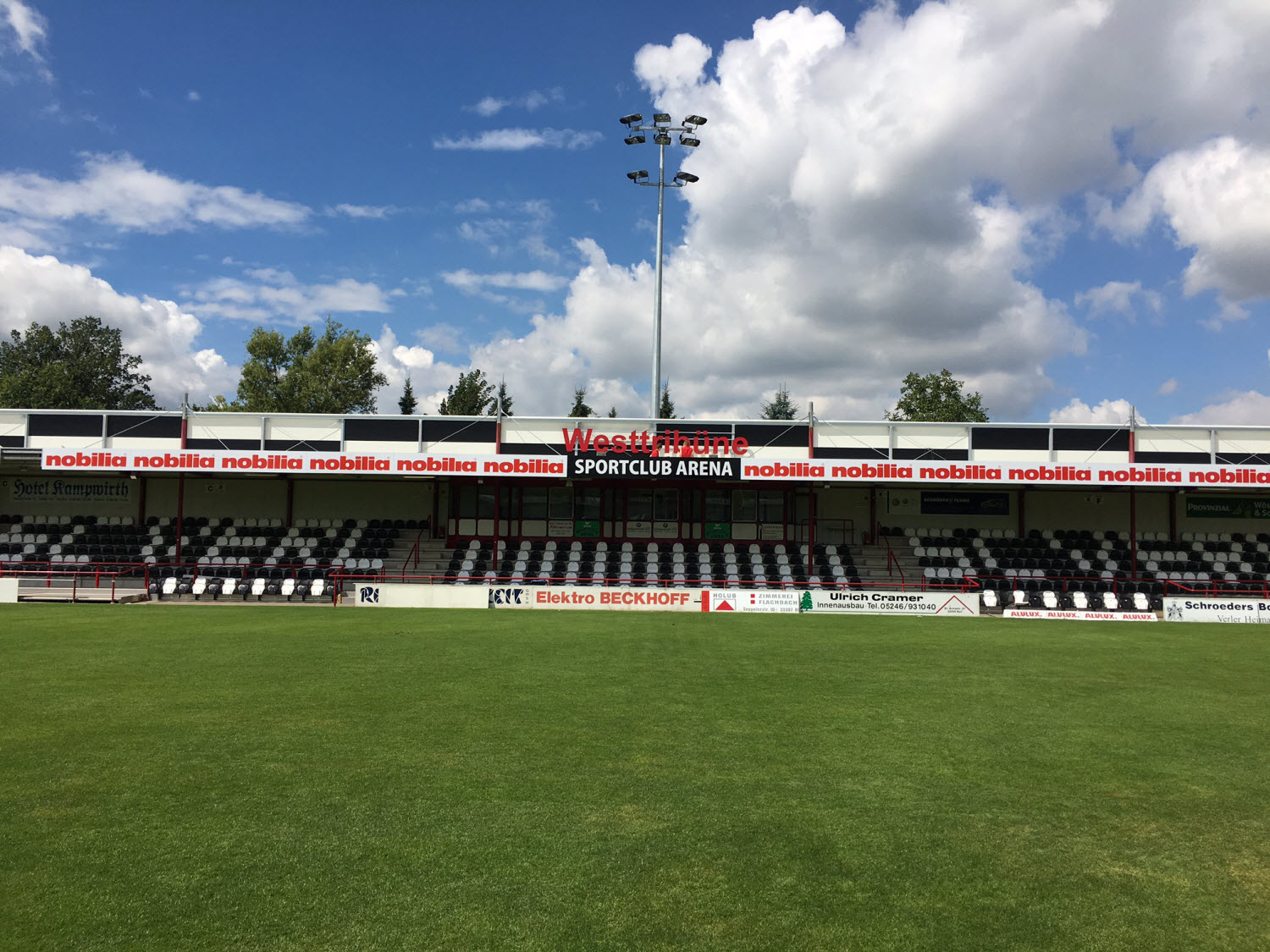
- Western stand in 2016
- Interactive map of Sportclub Arena
- Full name: Sportclub Arena
- Location: Verl, Germany
- Coordinates: 51.8834°N 8.5134°E
- Capacity: 5,207
- Surface: Hybrid grass

Construction
- Built: 1994
- Renovated: 2023

Tenant
- SC Verl

Sportclub Arena is an association football stadium in Verl, Germany, and the home ground of 3. Liga club SC Verl. Following the most recent renovation in 2023 the ground has a capacity of 5,207.

== History ==
The Sportclub Arena was built in 1994 following SC Verl's qualification for the newly created Regionalliga West/Südwest. The stadium was built to fulfill the requirements of the DFB at the time. Following nearly 25 years of participation in the Regionalliga, Verl was promoted to the 3. Liga in the 2019-20 season. The Sportclub Arena did not meet the requirements to be Verl's home ground after their promotion from the Regionalliga West to the 3. Liga, and the club was forced to carry out its home matches in Lotte at the Stadion am Lotter Kreuz. During the 2022-23 season, SC Verl played its home matches in Home Deluxe Arena in Paderborn.

The DFB announced that starting in the 2023-24 season the minimum required capacity of 3. Liga stadiums would be reduced from 10,001 to 5,001, as a part of the DFB's "3. Liga Economic Task Force". After this announcement, renovation works began in 2022 to bring the ground up to 3. Liga standards. These works cost roughly 8 million euros, and included the installation of undersoil heating and floodlight upgrades.

== Records ==
The record for highest attendance in the 3. Liga at the Sportclub Arena is 5,207, set on October 3, 2023, in a match between Verl and Arminia Bielefeld. Verl won the sold-out match 3:1, with goals scored by Oliver Batista Meier, Nico Ochojski and Yari Otto.

== Transport ==
The stadium is served by the local bus network line 73. Travelling by train to the ground is not recommended by SC Verl as the nearest rail station, the Gütersloh Central Station, is 12 kilometers away from the ground.
