= Niklas Hauptmann =

German footballer

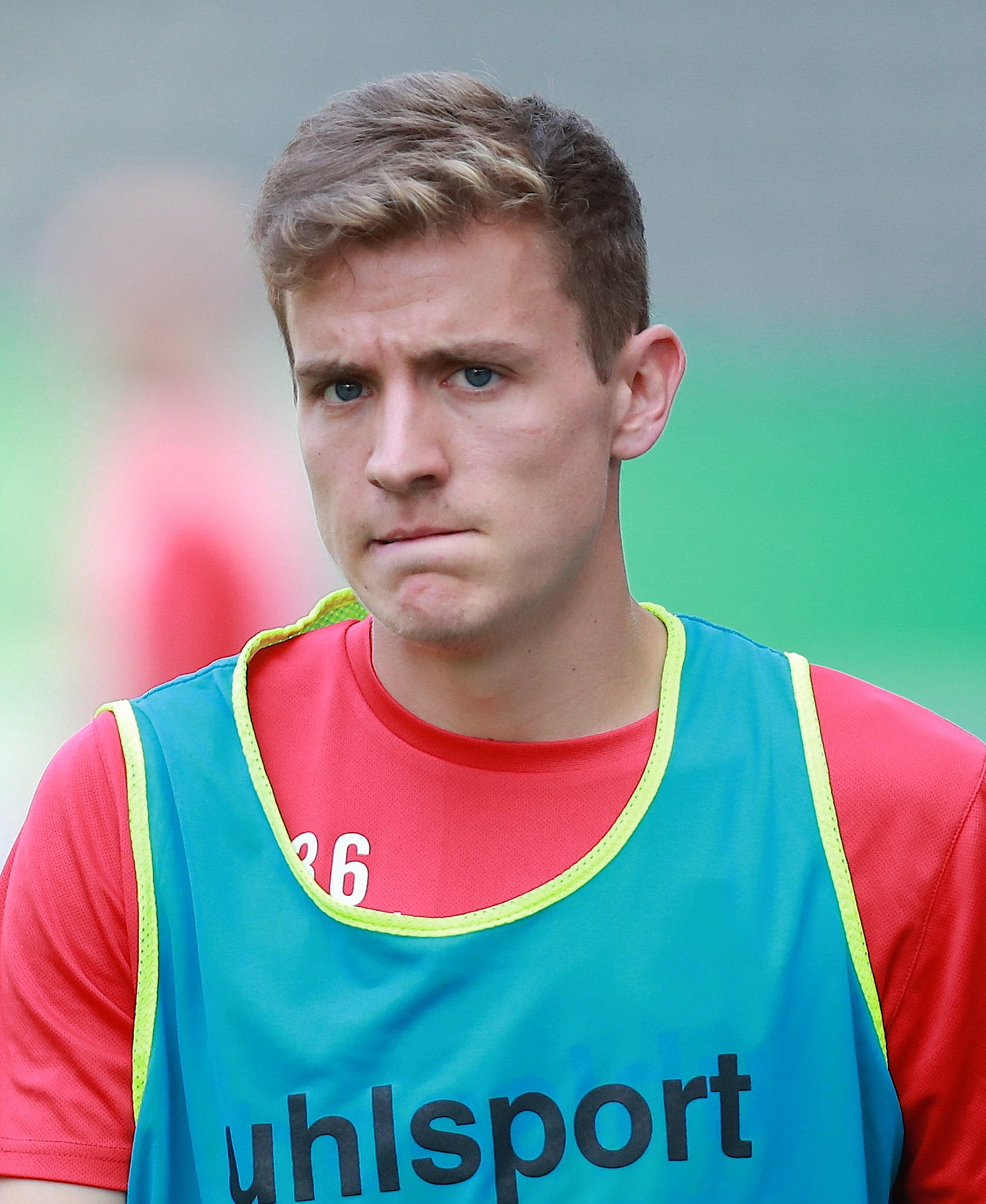
- Niklas Hauptmann (2018)

Personal information
- Date of birth: 27 June 1996 (age 30)
- Place of birth: Cologne, Germany
- Height: 1.76 m (5 ft 9 in)
- Position: Midfielder

Team information
- Current team: Dynamo Dresden
- Number: 27

Youth career
- 2008–2015: Dynamo Dresden

Senior career*
Years	Team	Apps	(Gls)
2015–2018	Dynamo Dresden	56	(2)
2018–2022	1. FC Köln	12	(0)
2018–2022	1. FC Köln II	11	(2)
2020–2021	→ Holstein Kiel (loan)	31	(0)
2022–	Dynamo Dresden	127	(20)
- * Club domestic league appearances and goals as of 18 May 2026

Niklas Hauptmann (born 27 June 1996) is a German professional footballer who plays as a midfielder for 2. Bundesliga club Dynamo Dresden.

== Career ==
Hauptmann was born in Cologne.

In May 2018, it was announced Hauptmann would join 1. FC Köln, newly relegated to the 2. Bundesliga, from Dynamo Dresden for the 2018–19 season. He thereby followed in the footsteps of his father Ralf who had played for 1. FC Köln in the 1990s and returned to his place of birth.

In July 2020, it was announced that Hauptmann would spend the 2020–21 season on loan at Holstein Kiel.

On 31 August 2022, Köln announced on their website that Hauptmann would return to Dynamo Dresden and sign a contract with the team until 2024.

== Personal life ==
His father, Ralf, was also a professional footballer and former East German international. His younger brother Marius is also a professional footballer, currently playing for FSV Zwickau.

== Career statistics ==
As of 1 August 2020

Appearances and goals by club, season and competition
Club	Season	League			Cup		Total	
Club	Season	Division	Apps	Goals	Apps	Goals	Apps	Goals
Dynamo Dresden	2015–16	3. Liga	2	0	0	0	2	0
Dynamo Dresden	2016–17	2. Bundesliga	29	2	1	0	30	2
Dynamo Dresden	2017–18	2. Bundesliga	25	0	1	0	26	0
Dynamo Dresden	Total		56	2	2	0	58	2
1. FC Köln	2018–19	2. Bundesliga	12	0	0	0	12	0
1. FC Köln II	2018–19	Regionalliga West	1	0	0	0	1	0
1. FC Köln II	2019–20	Regionalliga West	5	2	0	0	5	2
1. FC Köln II	Total		6	2	0	0	6	2
Career total			74	4	2	0	76	4
