= 2021–22 1. FC Saarbrücken season =

1. FC Saarbrücken
2021–22 season
- Manager: Uwe Koschinat
- Stadium: Ludwigsparkstadion
- 3. Liga: 7th
- Saarland Cup: Quarter-finals
- Top goalscorer: Adriano Grimaldi (10 goals)
- Highest home attendance: 15,000 (6 November 2021 vs. FC Kaiserslautern)
- Lowest home attendance: 4,800 (18 December 2021 vs. TSV Havelse)

The 2021–22 1. FC Saarbrücken season was the 115th season in the club's football history. They played in the 3. Liga, their second consecutive season in the third tier since being promoted from the Regionalliga. They also participated in the Saarland Cup.

== Transfers ==
=== In ===
Pos	Player	Transferred from	Fee	Date	Source
FW	(Germany) Justin Steinkötter	(Germany) Borussia Mönchengladbach II	Free transfer	1 July 2021	
DF	(Germany) Nick Galle	(Germany) Alemannia Aachen	Free transfer	1 July 2021	
MF	(Germany) Dave Gnaase	(Germany) KFC Uerdingen	Undisclosed	1 July 2021	
FW	(Germany) Adriano Grimaldi	(Germany) KFC Uerdingen	Undisclosed	1 July 2021	
DF	(Germany) Dominik Ernst	(Germany) FC Magdeburg	Undisclosed	1 July 2021	
MF	(Germany) Tim Korzuschek	(Germany) FC Gießen	Undisclosed	1 July 2021	
DF	(Germany) Alexander Groiß	(Germany) Karlsruher SC	Undisclosed	1 July 2021	
GK	(Germany) Marcel Johnen	(Germany) Bayer Leverkusen U19	Undisclosed	1 July 2021	
GK	(Germany) Jonas Hupe	(Germany) Bonner SC	Undisclosed	1 July 2021	
MF	(Germany) Robin Scheu	(Germany) SV Sandhausen	Undisclosed	1 July 2021	
DF	(Brazil) Bruno Soares	(Austria) WSG Tirol	Undisclosed	7 July 2021	
DF	(Germany) Dennis Erdmann	(Germany) TSV 1860 Munich	Free transfer	18 July 2021	
DF	(Germany) Pius Krätschmer	(Germany) FC Nürnberg	Undisclosed	5 August 2021	
DF	(Germany) Dominik Becker	(Germany) SV Werder Bremen II	Loan	11 January 2022	

=== Out ===
Pos	Player	Transferred to	Fee	Date	Source
FW	(Germany) Nicklas Shipnoski	(Germany) Fortuna Düsseldorf	Undisclosed	1 July 2021	
MF	(Germany) Markus Mendler	(Germany) FC 08 Homburg	Undisclosed	1 July 2021	
DF	(Croatia) Marin Šverko	(Netherlands) FC Groningen	Undisclosed	18 June 2021	
DF	(Brazil) Bruno Soares	Unattached	N/A	15 July 2021	
MF	(Germany) Tim Korzuschek	(Germany) Alemannia Aachen	Loan	23 December 2021	
DF	(Germany) Dennis Erdmann	(United States) Colorado Springs Switchbacks	Free	5 January 2022	

== Competitions ==
=== Friendlies ===
26 June 2021	Spvgg Quierschied	0–6	FC Saarbrücken	Quierschied
		Report	(o.g.) Quierschied own goal Jänicke; Grimaldi; Günther-Schmidt; Köhl; Scheu	Stadium: Sportplatz Quierschied

30 June 2021	CS Fola Esch	2–1	FC Saarbrücken	Esch-sur-Alzette
	Omosanya 31', 51'	Report	84' Deville	Stadium: Stade Émile Mayrisch

3 July 2021	FC Saarbrücken	Cancelled	SV Darmstadt 98

3 July 2021	K.A.S. Eupen	1–1	FC Saarbrücken	Eupen
16:00 CEST (UTC+2)	Ngoy 75'	Report	Grimaldi 41'	Attendance: 0

10 July 2021	SC Freiburg	2–1	FC Saarbrücken	Freiburg
15:00 CEST (UTC+2)	Sildillia 47'; Weißhaupt 53'	Report	9' Grimaldi	Stadium: Dreisamstadion; Attendance: 3,000

13 July 2021	SV 1920 Mettlach	1–10	FC Saarbrücken	Mettlach
18:00 CEST (UTC+2)		Report		Stadium: Villeroy & Boch Stadium; Attendance: 750

17 July 2021	Karlsruher SC	1–0	FC Saarbrücken	Karlsruhe
				Stadium: Grenke Stadion

=== 3. Liga ===
==== League table ====
Pos	Team	Pld	W	D	L	GF	GA	GD	Pts
5	Waldhof Mannheim	36	16	12	8	58	40	+18	60
6	VfL Osnabrück	36	16	10	10	56	48	+8	58
7	1. FC Saarbrücken	36	14	11	11	50	44	+6	53
8	Wehen Wiesbaden	36	14	9	13	49	44	+5	51
9	Borussia Dortmund II (Note: Reserve teams are ineligible for promotion or DFB-Pokal qualification.)	36	14	7	15	51	48	+3	49

Source: DFB
Rules for classification: 1) Points; 2) Goal difference; 3) Goals scored; 4) Head-to-head results; 5) Head-to-head away goals scored; 6) Away goals scored; 7) Play-off.

==== Matches ====
24 July 2021	TSV Havelse	0–1	FC Saarbrücken	Hanover
14:00 CEST (UTC+2)		Report	Gouras 19'	Stadium: HDI Arena

31 July 2021	FC Saarbrücken	1–2	VfL Osnabrück	Saarbrücken
14:00 CEST (UTC+2)	Günther-Schmidt 13'	Report	Traoré (red card) 4'; Erdmann 6' (o.g.); Simakala 43'	Stadium: Ludwigsparkstadion; Attendance: 6,400

14 August 2021	FC Saarbrücken	2–0	MSV Duisburg	Saarbrücken
14:00 CEST (UTC+2)	Günther-Schmidt 27'; Gouras 35'	Report		Stadium: Ludwigsparkstadion; Attendance: 6,204

21 August 2021	Borussia Dortmund II	0–0	FC Saarbrücken	Dortmund
14:00 CEST (UTC+2)		Report		Stadium: Stadion Rote Erde

25 August 2021	FC Saarbrücken	2–1	FC Magdeburg	Saarbrücken
19:00 CEST (UTC+2)	Grimaldi 65'; Scheu 69' (pen.)	Report	Atik 8'	Stadium: Ludwigsparkstadion; Attendance: 6,400

29 August 2021	Würzburger Kickers	1–1	FC Saarbrücken	Würzburg
14:00 CEST (UTC+2)	Sané 23'		Gouras 90+2'	Stadium: flyeralarm Arena; Attendance: 6,400

3 September 2021	FC Saarbrücken	3–4	Wehen Wiesbaden	Saarbrücken
19:00 CEST (UTC+2)	Jänicke 56'; Grimaldi 68'; Steinkötter 84'		Gürleyen 8'; Thiel 10'; Goppel 26'; Taffertshofer 44'	Stadium: Ludwigsparkstadion; Attendance: 6,400

11 September 2021	FC Viktoria Köln	0–0	FC Saarbrücken	Cologne
14:00 CEST (UTC+2)	Berzel (red card) 53'			Stadium: Sportpark Höhenberg; Attendance: 2,705

18 September 2021	FC Saarbrücken	3–1	Türkgücü München	Saarbrücken
14:00 CEST (UTC+2)	Krätschmer 26'; Jacob 32'; Gouras 52'		Knöll 14'	Stadium: Ludwigsparkstadion; Attendance: 6,300

25 September 2021	SV Meppen	2–2	FC Saarbrücken	Meppen
14:00 CEST (UTC+2)	Tankulić 29' (pen.); Evseev 85'		Grimaldi 7'; Gouras 14'	Stadium: Hänsch-Arena; Attendance: 6,171

1 October 2021	FC Saarbrücken	2–2	Eintracht Braunschweig	Saarbrücken
	Grimaldi 36'; Kerber 60'		Lauberbach 57'; Krätschmer 85' (o.g.)	Stadium: Ludwigsparkstadion; Attendance: 10,053

16 October 2021	Hallescher FC	2–3	FC Saarbrücken	Halle
	Eberwein 43'; Boyd 45+1'		Grimaldi 25' (pen.), 88'; Jacob 88'	Stadium: Erdgas Sportpark; Attendance: 5,634

23 October 2021	FC Saarbrücken	1–1	TSV 1860 Munich	Saarbrücken
	Günther-Schmidt 80' (pen.)		Biankadi 58'	Stadium: Ludwigsparkstadion; Attendance: 12,347

30 October 2021	SV Waldhof Mannheim	1–0	FC Saarbrücken	Mannheim
	Boyamba 62'			Stadium: Carl-Benz-Stadion; Attendance: 10,316

6 November 2021	FC Saarbrücken	0–2	FC Kaiserslautern	Saarbrücken
			Tomiak 32'; Redondo 67'	Stadium: Ludwigsparkstadion; Attendance: 15,000

19 November 2021	SC Verl	2–4	FC Saarbrücken	Lotte
	Putaro 60'; Berlinski 65'		Grimaldi 15', 73'; Deville 71'; Günther-Schmidt 90+4' (pen.)	Stadium: Stadion am Lotter Kreuz; Attendance: 565

27 November 2021	FC Saarbrücken	2–0	Viktoria Berlin	Saarbrücken
	Jänicke 79'; Deville 85'			Stadium: Ludwigsparkstadion; Attendance: 6,094

3 December 2021	FSV Zwickau	1–2	FC Saarbrücken	Zwickau
	Nkansah 66'		Günther-Schmidt 3'; Jacob 90' (pen.)	Stadium: Stadion Zwickau; Attendance: 0

11 December 2021	FC Saarbrücken	1–0	SC Freiburg II	Saarbrücken
	Zeitz 44'			Stadium: Ludwigsparkstadion; Attendance: 6,800

18 December 2021	FC Saarbrücken	2–2	TSV Havelse	Saarbrücken
	Jänicke 34'; Günther-Schmidt 78'		Lakenmacher 62', 69'	Stadium: Ludwigsparkstadion; Attendance: 4,800

15 January 2022	VfL Osnabrück	2–1	FC Saarbrücken	Osnabrück
	Bertram 17'; Müller 84' (o.g.)		Steinkötter 87'	Stadium: Stadion an der Bremer Brücke; Attendance: 0

23 January 2022	MSV Duisburg	3–4	FC Saarbrücken	Duisburg
	Bouhaddouz 74', 80'; Ademi 88'		Jacob 11'; Weinkauf 64' (o.g.); Grimaldi 68', 78'	Stadium: MSV-Arena; Attendance: 750

26 January 2022	FC Saarbrücken	2–0	Borussia Dortmund II	Saarbrücken
	Grimaldi 51'; Gouras 79'			Stadium: Ludwigsparkstadion; Attendance: 999

29 January 2022	FC Magdeburg	2–1	FC Saarbrücken	Magdeburg
	Atik 13'; Conteh 47'		Günther-Schmidt 33'	Stadium: MDCC-Arena; Attendance: 14,300

7 February 2022	FC Saarbrücken	2–1	Würzburger Kickers	Saarbrücken
	Zeitz 68'; Jacob 81'		Becker 2'	Stadium: Ludwigsparkstadion; Attendance: 1,000

12 February 2022	Wehen Wiesbaden	1–0	FC Saarbrücken	Wiesbaden
	Nilsson 48'			Stadium: Brita-Arena; Attendance: 2,683

19 February 2022	FC Saarbrücken	0–1	FC Viktoria Köln	Saarbrücken
			Ernst 7' (o.g.)	Stadium: Ludwigsparkstadion; Attendance: 6,419

28 February 2022	Türkgücü München	1–5	FC Saarbrücken	Munich
	Karweina 12'		Jacob 21', 55'; Hawkins 24'; Günther-Schmidt 53'; Steinkötter 74'	Stadium: Olympiastadion; Attendance: 800

5 March 2022	FC Saarbrücken	1–0	SV Meppen	Saarbrücken
	Ernst 48'			Stadium: Ludwigsparkstadion; Attendance: 6,735

12 March 2022	Eintracht Braunschweig	0–2	FC Saarbrücken	Braunschweig
			Zeitz 37'; Steinkötter 89'	Stadium: Eintracht-Stadion; Attendance: 14,552

19 March 2022	FC Saarbrücken	2–1	Hallescher FC	Saarbrücken
	Boeder 22'; Günther-Schmidt 26'		Huth 64'	Stadium: Ludwigsparkstadion; Attendance: 7,092

2 April 2022	TSV 1860 Munich	1–1	FC Saarbrücken	Munich
	Tallig 74'		Jacob 90+1'	Stadium: Grünwalder Stadion; Attendance: 15,000

9 April 2022	FC Saarbrücken	0–0	SV Waldhof Mannheim	Saarbrücken
				Stadium: Ludwigsparkstadion; Attendance: 15,000

16 April 2022	FC Kaiserslautern	3–1	FC Saarbrücken	Kaiserslautern
	Hanslik 17'; Boyd 57'; Redondo 65'		Jänicke 65'	Stadium: Fritz-Walter-Stadion; Attendance: 46,895

23 April 2022	FC Saarbrücken	1–2	SC Verl	Saarbrücken
	Günther-Schmidt 23'		Berlinski 32'; Rabihic 83'	Stadium: Ludwigsparkstadion; Attendance: 6,283

30 April 2022	Viktoria Berlin	2–1	FC Saarbrücken	Berlin
	Küç 34'; Hovi 90+2'		Jänicke 24'	Stadium: Friedrich-Ludwig-Jahn-Sportpark; Attendance: 1,466

7 May 2022	FC Saarbrücken	1–1	FSV Zwickau	Saarbrücken
		Report		Stadium: Ludwigsparkstadion; Attendance: 7,127

14 May 2022	SC Freiburg II	1–1	FC Saarbrücken	Freiburg
13:30 CEST (UTC+2)		Report		Stadium: Schwarzwald-Stadion; Attendance: 2,650

=== Saarland Cup ===
10 October 2021	SG Mettlach Merzig	0–4	FC Saarbrücken	Mettlach
		Report	Galle 2', 80'; Steinkötter 23'; Jacob 27'	Stadium: Sportplatz Britter Straße

10 November 2021	FSV Jägersburg	0–4	FC Saarbrücken	Homburg
		Report	Köhl 22'; Jacob 28'; Jänicke 41'; Günther-Schmidt 53'	Stadium: Alois-Omlor-Sportpark

30 March 2022	FC 08 Homburg	2–1	FC Saarbrücken	Homburg
	Dulleck 42'; Ristl 82'		Ernst 51'	Stadium: Waldstadion Homburg; Attendance: 6,176
