= 2023–24 Rot-Weiss Essen season =

Rot-Weiss Essen
2023–24 season
- Chairman: Marcus Uhlig
- Head coach: Christoph Dabrowski
- Stadium: Stadion an der Hafenstraße
- 3. Liga: 7th
- DFB-Pokal: First round
- Top goalscorer: League: Marvin Obuz (4); All: Leonardo Vonić; Marvin Obuz; Torben Müsel (5 each)
- Average home league attendance: 16,652

The 2023–24 season was Rot-Weiss Essen's 117th season in existence and second consecutive season in the 3. Liga. They also competed in the DFB-Pokal.

== Players ==
=== First-team squad ===
As of 2 September 2023

Note: Flags indicate national team as defined under FIFA eligibility rules; some limited exceptions apply. Players may hold more than one non-FIFA nationality.

No.	Pos.	Nation	Player
1	GK	GER	Jakob Golz
2	DF	GER	Sascha Voelcke
3	DF	GER	Aaron Manu
4	DF	GER	Felix Bastians (captain)
6	MF	GER	Björn Rother
7	MF	GER	Andreas Wiegel
8	MF	GER	Cedric Harenbrock
9	FW	GER	Ron Berlinski
10	MF	GER	Thomas Eisfeld
11	FW	GER	Marvin Obuz (on loan from 1. FC Köln)
14	FW	GER	Lucas Brumme
16	DF	GER	Mustafa Kourouma
17	DF	GER	Ekin Çelebi

No.	Pos.	Nation	Player
18	MF	GER	Nils Kaiser
19	DF	GER	Eric Voufack
20	FW	CRO	Leonardo Vonić
21	DF	GER	Sandro Plechaty
23	DF	GER	José-Enrique Ríos Alonso
24	MF	GER	Felix Götze
26	FW	GER	Torben Müsel
27	MF	GER	Vinko Šapina
29	FW	GUI	Moussa Doumbouya
30	FW	USA	Isaiah Young
31	GK	GER	Ole Springer
35	GK	GER	Felix Wienand
37	DF	GER	Fabian Rüth

=== Out on loan ===
Note: Flags indicate national team as defined under FIFA eligibility rules; some limited exceptions apply. Players may hold more than one non-FIFA nationality.

No.	Pos.	Nation	Player
—	MF	SUI	Ben Heuser (at FC Cosmos Koblenz until 30 June 2024)

== Transfers ==
=== In ===
Pos.	Player	Transferred from	Fee	Date	Source
DF	(Germany) Felix Götze	(Germany) FC Augsburg	€100k	1 July 2023	
MF	(Germany) Vinko Šapina	(Germany) SC Verl	€40k	1 July 2023	
FW	(Guinea) Moussa Doumbouya	(Germany) FC Ingolstadt	Free	1 July 2023	
DF	(Guinea) Ekin Çelebi	(Germany) Hannover 96	Free	1 July 2023	
FW	(Germany) Marvin Obuz	(Germany) 1. FC Köln	Loan	7 July 2023	
FW	(Croatia) Leonardo Vonić	(Germany) 1. FC Nürnberg II	€100k	25 July 2023	

=== Out ===
Pos.	Player	Transferred to	Fee	Date	Source
FW	(Germany) Simon Engelmann	(Germany) SV Rödinghausen	Free	1 July 2023	
MF	(Germany) Niklas Tarnat	(Germany) 1860 Munich	Free	21 July 2023	

== Pre-season and friendlies ==
Win Draw Loss Fixtures

4 July 2023 Friendly	VfB Bottrop (Germany)	0–8	(Germany) Rot-Weiss Essen
18:30 CEST (UTC+2)

8 July 2023 Friendly	Schwarz-Weiß Essen (Germany)	2–5	(Germany) Rot-Weiss Essen
17:00 CEST (UTC+2)

15 July 2023 Friendly	FC Gütersloh (Germany)	1–3	(Germany) Rot-Weiss Essen
16:00 CEST (UTC+2)

22 July 2023 Friendly	Eintracht Braunschweig (Germany)	1–0	(Germany) Rot-Weiss Essen
13:00 CEST (UTC+2)

26 July 2023 Friendly	Adler Union Frintrop (Germany)	0–6	(Germany) Rot-Weiss Essen
19:00 CEST (UTC+2)

== Competitions ==
Competition	First match	Last match	Starting round	Final position	Record							
Competition	First match	Last match	Starting round	Final position	Pld	W	D	L	GF	GA	GD	Win %
3. Liga	4 August 2023	18 May 2024	Matchday 1		34	16	7	11	53	47	+6	47.06
DFB-Pokal	13 August 2023		First round	First round	1	0	0	1	3	4	−1	0.00
Total					35	16	7	12	56	51	+5	45.71

Last updated: 24 April 2024
Source: Soccerway

=== 3. Liga ===
==== League table ====
Pos	Team	Pld	W	D	L	GF	GA	GD	Pts
5	1. FC Saarbrücken	38	15	15	8	60	43	+17	60
6	Erzgebirge Aue	38	16	12	10	51	47	+4	60
7	Rot-Weiss Essen	38	17	8	13	60	53	+7	59
8	SV Sandhausen	38	15	11	12	58	57	+1	56
9	SpVgg Unterhaching	38	16	7	15	50	49	+1	55

Source: DFB
Rules for classification: 1) Points; 2) Goal difference; 3) Goals scored; 4) Head-to-head results; 5) Head-to-head away goals scored; 6) Away goals scored; 7) Play-off.

==== Results summary ====
Overall								Home						Away					
Pld	W	D	L	GF	GA	GD	Pts	W	D	L	GF	GA	GD	W	D	L	GF	GA	GD
34	16	7	11	53	47	+6	55	11	2	4	32	23	+9	5	5	7	21	24	−3

Last updated: 24 April 2024.
Source: Soccerway

==== Results by round ====
Round	1	2	3	4	5	6	7	8	9	10	11	12	13	14	15	16	17
Ground	A	H	A	H	A	H	A	H	A	H	A	H	A	H	H	A	H
Result	L	D	D	W	W	D	L	W	L	L	W	W	W	W	W	L	L
Position	16	14	16	11	8	7	12	8	13	15	11	6	5	3	3	4	6

Updated to match(es) played on 24 April 2024. Source: Soccerway
A = Away; H = Home; W = Win; D = Draw; L = Loss

==== Matches ====
The league fixtures were unveiled on 7 July 2023.

4 August 2023 1	Hallescher FC	2–1	Rot-Weiss Essen	Halle
19:15 CEST (UTC+2)	Baumann 2'; Hug (yellow card) 24'; Halangk (yellow card) 32'; Baumgart 39'; Lofolomo (yellow card) 85'; Wolf (yellow card) 90'	Report	Young 69'; Wiegel (yellow card) 86'	Stadium: Leuna Chemie Stadion; Attendance: 12,429; Referee: Patrick Kessel

20 August 2023 2	Rot-Weiss Essen	1–1	Erzgebirge Aue	Essen
19:30 CEST (UTC+2)	Müsel 30', (yellow card) 68'; Doumbouya (yellow card) 51'	Report	Seitz 17', (yellow card) 61'	Stadium: Stadion an der Hafenstraße; Attendance: 15,117; Referee: Patrick Schwengers

23 August 2023 3	Viktoria Köln	0–0	Rot-Weiss Essen	Köln
19:00 CEST (UTC+2)	Philipp (yellow card) 45+2'	Report	Berlinski (yellow card) 42'; Young (yellow card) 56'	Stadium: Sportpark Höhenberg; Attendance: 3,000; Referee: Leonidas Exuzidis

27 August 2023 4	Rot-Weiss Essen	1–0	Preußen Münster	Essen
19:30 CEST (UTC+2)	Šapina (yellow card) 30'; Götze (yellow card) 90+1'; Eisfeld 90+3'; Vonić (yellow card) 90+7'	Report	Kyerewaa (yellow card) 76'; Koulis (yellow card) 90+9'	Stadium: Stadion an der Hafenstraße; Attendance: 18,677; Referee: Lukas Benen

2 September 2023 5	SC Freiburg II	0–2	Rot-Weiss Essen	Freiburg
14:00 CEST (UTC+2)	Makengo (yellow card) 8'	Report	Harenbrock 51'; Obuz 90+4'	Stadium: Dreisamstadion; Attendance: 2,027; Referee: Nicolas Winter

16 September 2023 6	Rot-Weiss Essen	0–0	Jahn Regensburg	Essen
14:00 CEST (UTC+2)		Report	Schönfelder (yellow card) 17'; Gebhardt (yellow card) 44'; Geipl (yellow card) 74'	Stadium: Stadion an der Hafenstraße; Attendance: 17,000; Referee: Martin Speckner

24 September 2023 7	SSV Ulm	2–1	Rot-Weiss Essen	Ulm
13:30 CEST (UTC+2)	Chessa 19', 80'; Ahrend (yellow card) 27'; Reichert (yellow card) 53'	Report	Šapina (yellow card) 18', (goal) 86'; Götze (yellow card) 57'; Harenbrock (yellow card) 63'; Berlinski (yellow card) 82'	Stadium: Donaustadion; Attendance: 8,692; Referee: Marc Philip Eckermann

1 October 2023 8	Rot-Weiss Essen	3–1	Dynamo Dresden	Essen
13:30 CEST (UTC+2)	Götze 25'; Bastians (yellow card) 26', (goal) 80'; Šapina (yellow card) 40'; Voufack (yellow card) 85'; Müsel (yellow card) 86'; Doumbouya 89'	Report	Vlachodimos 90+7'	Stadium: Stadion an der Hafenstraße; Attendance: 18,657; Referee: Tobias Reichel

4 October 2023 9	SpVgg Unterhaching	4–0	Rot-Weiss Essen	Unterhaching
19:00 CEST (UTC+2)	Fetsch 28', 45+1', 57', 89'; Ortel (yellow card) 52'; Maier (yellow card) 83'	Report	Wiegel (yellow card) 88'	Stadium: Sportpark Unterhaching; Attendance: 3,600; Referee: Felix Prigan

7 October 2023 10	Rot-Weiss Essen	0–5	SC Verl	Essen
14:00 CEST (UTC+2)	Rother (red card) 85'	Report	Stöcker (yellow card) 13'; Lokotsch 39'; Batista 60' (pen.), 62', 74'; Otto (yellow card) 80'; Ochojski 82'	Stadium: Stadion an der Hafenstraße; Attendance: 14,907; Referee: Eric Weisbach

13 October 2023 11	Borussia Dortmund II	1–2	Rot-Wiess Essen	Dortmund
19:00 CEST (UTC+2)	Michel 57'; Hettwer (yellow card) 70'	Report	Kourouma 30'; Dabrowski (yellow card) 56'; Müsel 58', (yellow card) 76'; Plechaty (yellow card) 90+1'	Stadium: Signal Iduna Park; Attendance: 17,093; Referee: Riem Hussein

22 October 2023 12	Rot-Weiss Essen	2–1	1. FC Saarbrücken	Essen
16:30 CEST (UTC+2)	Young 7'; Vonić 18', (yellow card) 83'; Voufack (yellow card) 50'; Götze (yellow card) 81'; Dabrowski (yellow card) 83'; Voelcke (yellow card) 87'; Berlinski (yellow card) 89'	Report	Thoelke (yellow card) 29'; Naifi 40'; Boeder (yellow card) 64'; Gaus (yellow card) 67'	Stadium: Stadion an der Hafenstraße; Attendance: 17,217; Referee: Assad Nouhoum

28 October 2023 13	MSV Duisburg	1–2	Rot-Weiss Essen	Duisburg
14:00 CEST (UTC+2)	Stierlin (yellow card) 45+1'; Esswein (yellow card) 59'; Jander (yellow card) 70'; Šapina 89' (o.g.); Müller (yellow card) 90+2'; Bitter (yellow card) 90+4'; Müller (yellow card) 90+7'	Report	Alonso (yellow card) 44'; Obuz 63'; Kourouma 90+3'	Stadium: MSV-Arena; Attendance: 25,845; Referee: Florian Lechner

4 November 2023 14	Rot-Weiss Essen	2–1	Arminia Bielefeld	Essen
14:00 CEST (UTC+2)	Obuz 22'; Götze (yellow card) 85'; Berlinski 90+1'	Report	Oppie 86'	Stadium: Stadion an der Hafenstraße; Attendance: 19,200; Referee: Felix Bickel

12 November 2023 15	Rot-Weiss Essen	2–0	Waldhof Mannheim	Essen
16:30 CEST (UTC+2)	Brumme (yellow card) 47'; Harenbrock 68'; Obuz 74'; Alonso (yellow card) 83'	Report	Bahn (yellow card) 45+5'; Rieckmann (yellow card) 58'; Arase (yellow card) 87'	Stadium: Stadion an der Hafenstraße; Referee: Robert Kampka

25 November 2023 16	FC Ingolstadt	2–1	Rot-Weiss Essen	Ingolstadt
14:00 CEST (UTC+2)	Mause 17'; Kopacz 21', (yellow card) 89'; Fröde (yellow card) 57'; Funk (yellow card) 68'; Malone (yellow card) 75'; Keidel (yellow card) 87'; Kügel (red card) 90+4'	Report	Harenbrock 30'; Götze (yellow card) 48' (yellow-red card) 74'	Stadium: Audi Sportpark; Attendance: 10,610; Referee: Felix Prigan

2 December 2023 17	Rot-Weiss Essen	1–2	SV Sandhausen	Essen
14:00 CEST (UTC+2)	Berlinski 74'	Report	El-Zein (yellow card) 13', (goal) 38', 65'; Stolze (yellow card) 22'; Burcu (yellow card) 25'; Otto (yellow card) 81'; Weik (yellow card) 90+3'	Stadium: Stadion an der Hafenstraße; Attendance: 15,307; Referee: Patrick Kessel

19–21 April 2024 34	Waldhof Mannheim	v	Rot-Weiss Essen
--:-- CEST (UTC+2)

26–28 April 2024 35	Rot-Weiss Essen	v	FC Ingolstadt	Essen
--:-- CEST (UTC+2)				Stadium: Stadion an der Hafenstraße

3–5 May 2024 36	SV Sandhausen	v	Rot-Weiss Essen
--:-- CEST (UTC+2)

10–12 May 2024 37	Rot-Weiss Essen	v	1860 Munich	Essen
--:-- CEST (UTC+2)				Stadium: Stadion an der Hafenstraße

18 May 2024 38	VfB Lübeck	v	Rot-Weiss Essen
--:-- CEST (UTC+2)

=== DFB-Pokal ===
13 August 2023 Second round	Rot-Weiss Essen	3–4 (a.e.t.)	Hamburger SV	Essen
13:00 CEST (UTC+2)	Müsel 42'; Doumbouya 56'; Brumme 83'	Report	Jatta 37', 54'; Krahn (yellow card) 40'; Glatzel 66'; Van Der Brempt (yellow card) 72'; Ramos (yellow card) 98'; Ambrosius (yellow card) 106'; Bénes 117'; Königsdörffer (yellow card) 120+2'	Stadium: Stadion an der Hafenstraße; Referee: Felix Zwayer
