= 2023–24 Hallescher FC season =

Hallescher FC
2023–24 season
- Manager: Sreto Ristić (until 1 April); Stefan Reisinger (from 1 April)
- Stadium: Leuna-Chemie-Stadion
- 3. Liga: 17th (relegated)
- DFB-Pokal: First round
- Saxony-Anhalt Cup: Winners
- Top goalscorer: League: Dominic Baumann (15); All: Dominic Baumann (15)

The 2023–24 season was the 124th season in the history of Hallescher FC and 12th consecutive season in the German 3. Liga. By finishing in seventeenth place, the club was relegated to the regional league.

== Players ==
=== First-team squad ===
As of 1 April 2024

Note: Flags indicate national team as defined under FIFA eligibility rules; some limited exceptions apply. Players may hold more than one non-FIFA nationality.

| No. | Pos. | Nation | Player |
|---|---|---|---|
| 1 | GK | GER | Sven Müller |
| 2 | DF | POL | Sebastian Zieleniecki |
| 3 | DF | GER | Brian Behrendt |
| 5 | DF | GER | Jannes Vollert |
| 6 | MF | GER | Enrique Lofolomo |
| 8 | DF | GER | Niklas Kreuzer |
| 9 | FW | MNE | Meris Skenderović |
| 10 | MF | GER | Timur Gayret |
| 11 | FW | GER | Tom Baumgart |
| 14 | FW | GER | Henry Crosthwaite (on loan from Darmstadt 98) |
| 16 | DF | GER | Lucas Halangk |
| 17 | MF | SLO | Aljaž Casar |
| 19 | DF | GER | Jordi Wegmann |
| 20 | MF | GER | Tunay Deniz |

| No. | Pos. | Nation | Player |
|---|---|---|---|
| 21 | DF | GER | Tim-Justin Dietrich |
| 22 | DF | GER | Nico Hug |
| 23 | MF | KOS | Besar Halimi |
| 25 | DF | GER | Marvin Ajani |
| 28 | FW | GER | Dominic Baumann |
| 29 | FW | HUN | Ándor Bolyki |
| 30 | GK | GER | Moritz Schulze |
| 31 | DF | GER | Niklas Landgraf |
| 33 | MF | GER | Jonas Nietfeld (captain) |
| 35 | GK | GER | Philipp Schulze (on loan from VfL Wolfsburg) |
| 37 | MF | GER | Marco Wolf |
| 41 | FW | GER | Erich Berko |
| 42 | DF | GER | Julian Eitschberger (on loan from Hertha BSC) |
| 43 | FW | GER | Tarsis Bonga |

=== Out on loan ===
Note: Flags indicate national team as defined under FIFA eligibility rules; some limited exceptions apply. Players may hold more than one non-FIFA nationality.

| No. | Pos. | Nation | Player |
|---|---|---|---|
| — | FW | GER | Jonas Marx (at Greifswalder FC until 30 June 2024) |

== Transfers ==
=== In ===
| Pos. | Player | Transferred from | Fee | Date | Source |
|---|---|---|---|---|---|
| MF | (Kosovo) Besar Halimi | (Greece) Apollon Smyrnis | Free | 1 July 2023 | |
| FW | (Germany) Dominic Baumann | (Germany) FSV Zwickau | Free | 1 July 2023 | |
| MF | (Germany) Tom Baumgart | (Germany) Erzgebirge Aue | Free | 1 July 2023 | |
| FW | (Montenegro) Meris Skenderović | (Germany) 1860 Munich | Free | 16 July 2023 | |
| DF | (Germany) Marvin Ajani | Unattached | Free | 17 August 2023 | |
| DF | (Germany) Tarsis Bonga | (Germany) 1860 Munich | Free | 5 January 2024 | |

== Competitions ==
=== 3. Liga ===
| Competition | First match | Last match | Starting round | Final position | Record | | | | | | | |
| Competition | First match | Last match | Starting round | Final position | Pld | W | D | L | GF | GA | GD | Win % |
|---|---|---|---|---|---|---|---|---|---|---|---|---|
| 3. Liga | 4 August 2023 | 18 May 2024 | Matchday 1 | 17th | 38 | 11 | 7 | 20 | 50 | 68 | −18 | 28.95 |
| DFB-Pokal | 12 August 2023 | | First round | First round | 1 | 0 | 0 | 1 | 0 | 1 | −1 | 0.00 |
| Saxony-Anhalt Cup | 17 November 2023 | 25 May 2024 | First round | Winners | 4 | 4 | 0 | 0 | 12 | 3 | +9 | 100.00 |
| Total | | | | | 43 | 15 | 7 | 21 | 62 | 72 | −10 | 34.88 |

Source: [ Soccerway]

==== League table ====
| Pos | Team | Pld | W | D | L | GF | GA | GD | Pts | Promotion, qualification or relegation |
|---|---|---|---|---|---|---|---|---|---|---|
| 15 | 1860 Munich | 38 | 13 | 7 | 18 | 40 | 42 | −2 | 46 | |
| 16 | Waldhof Mannheim | 38 | 11 | 10 | 17 | 51 | 60 | −9 | 43 | |
| 17 | Hallescher FC (R) | 38 | 11 | 7 | 20 | 50 | 68 | −18 | 40 | Relegation to Regionalliga |
| 18 | MSV Duisburg (R) | 38 | 8 | 10 | 20 | 41 | 65 | −24 | 34 | Relegation to Regionalliga |
| 19 | VfB Lübeck (R) | 38 | 6 | 14 | 18 | 37 | 77 | −40 | 32 | Relegation to Regionalliga |

Source: DFB
Rules for classification: 1) Points; 2) Goal difference; 3) Goals scored; 4) Head-to-head results; 5) Head-to-head away goals scored; 6) Away goals scored; 7) Play-off.
(R) Relegated

==== Results summary ====
| Overall | | | | | | | | Home | | | | | | Away | | | | | |
| Pld | W | D | L | GF | GA | GD | Pts | W | D | L | GF | GA | GD | W | D | L | GF | GA | GD |
|---|---|---|---|---|---|---|---|---|---|---|---|---|---|---|---|---|---|---|---|
| 38 | 11 | 7 | 20 | 50 | 68 | −18 | 40 | 7 | 4 | 8 | 27 | 30 | −3 | 4 | 3 | 12 | 23 | 38 | −15 |

Source: 3. Liga

==== Results by round ====
| Round | 1 | 2 | 3 | 4 | 5 | 6 | 7 | 8 | 9 | 10 | 11 | 12 | 13 | 14 | 15 | 16 | 17 | 18 | 19 | 20 | 21 | 22 | 23 | 24 | 25 | 26 | 27 | 28 | 29 | 30 | 31 | 32 | 33 | 34 | 35 | 36 | 37 | 38 |
|---|---|---|---|---|---|---|---|---|---|---|---|---|---|---|---|---|---|---|---|---|---|---|---|---|---|---|---|---|---|---|---|---|---|---|---|---|---|---|
| Ground | H | A | H | A | H | A | H | A | A | H | A | H | A | H | A | H | A | H | A | A | H | A | H | A | H | A | H | H | A | H | A | H | A | H | A | H | A | H |
| Result | W | L | D | L | W | L | L | D | L | L | W | L | W | W | L | L | L | D | L | L | W | W | L | D | L | L | W | W | L | D | L | L | L | W | W | L | D | D |
| Position | 4 | 11 | 13 | 17 | 11 | 14 | 18 | 17 | 17 | 19 | 17 | 18 | 16 | 16 | 16 | 16 | 16 | 16 | 16 | 17 | 16 | 16 | 16 | 16 | 16 | 16 | 16 | 15 | 16 | 16 | 17 | 17 | 17 | 17 | 17 | 17 | 17 | 17 |

Source: 3. Liga
A = Away; H = Home; W = Win; D = Draw; L = Loss

==== Matches ====
| 4 August 2023 1 | Hallescher FC | 2–1 | Rot-Weiss Essen | Halle |
| | | | | Stadium: Leuna-Chemie-Stadion |

| 19 August 2023 2 | Ingolstadt 04 | 4–0 | Hallescher FC | Ingolstadt |

| 22 August 2023 3 | Hallescher FC | 1–1 | MSV Duisburg | Halle |
| | | | | Stadium: Leuna-Chemie-Stadion |

| 27 August 2023 4 | Waldhof Mannheim | 3–2 | Hallescher FC | Mannheim |
| | | | | Stadium: Carl-Benz-Stadion |

| 3 September 2023 5 | Hallescher FC | 4–1 | SV Sandhausen | Halle |
| | | | | Stadium: Leuna-Chemie-Stadion |

| 17 September 2023 6 | Erzgebirge Aue | 3–1 | Hallescher FC | Aue |

| 23 September 2023 7 | Hallescher FC | 0–2 | 1860 München | Halle |
| | | | | Stadium: Leuna-Chemie-Stadion |

| 30 September 2023 8 | VfB Lübeck | 2–2 | Hallescher FC | Lübeck |

| 4 October 2023 9 | Dynamo Dresden | 2–1 | Hallescher FC | Dresden |

| 8 October 2023 10 | Hallescher FC | 1–4 | Preußen Münster | Halle |
| | | | | Stadium: Leuna-Chemie-Stadion |

| 21 October 2023 12 | Hallescher FC | 1–2 | Jahn Regensburg | Halle |
| | | | | Stadium: Leuna-Chemie-Stadion |

| 28 October 2023 13 | SSV Ulm | 2–3 | Hallescher FC | Ulm |

| 5 November 2023 14 | Hallescher FC | 2–1 | Viktoria Köln | Halle |
| | | | | Stadium: Leuna-Chemie-Stadion |

| 11 November 2023 15 | SC Verl | 3–2 | Hallescher FC | Verl |

| 25 November 2023 16 | Hallescher FC | 0–2 | 1. FC Saarbrücken | Halle |
| | | | | Stadium: Leuna-Chemie-Stadion |

| 28 November 2023 11 | SC Freiburg II | 1–2 | Hallescher FC | Freiburg |

| 8 December 2023 18 | Hallescher FC | 2–2 | Arminia Bielefeld | Halle |
| | | | | Stadium: Leuna-Chemie-Stadion |

| 16 December 2023 19 | Borussia Dortmund II | 2–1 | Hallescher FC | Dortmund |

| 19 December 2023 20 | Rot-Weiss Essen | 3–2 | Hallescher FC | Essen |

| 20 January 2024 21 | Hallescher FC | 3–1 | Ingolstadt 04 | Halle |
| | | | | Stadium: Leuna-Chemie-Stadion |

| 23 January 2024 22 | MSV Duisburg | 2–3 | Hallescher FC | Duisburg |

| 26 January 2024 23 | Hallescher FC | 1–4 | Waldhof Mannheim | Halle |
| | | | | Stadium: Leuna-Chemie-Stadion |

| 3 February 2024 24 | SV Sandhausen | 1–1 | Hallescher FC | Sandhausen |

| 7 February 2024 17 | Unterhaching | 2–0 | Hallescher FC |

| 11 February 2024 25 | Hallescher FC | 2–3 | Erzgebirge Aue | Halle |
| | | | | Stadium: Leuna-Chemie-Stadion |

| 18 February 2024 26 | 1860 München | 1–0 | Hallescher FC | Munich |

| 25 February 2024 27 | Hallescher FC | 3–0 | VfB Lübeck | Halle |
| | | | | Stadium: Leuna-Chemie-Stadion |

| 2 March 2024 28 | Hallescher FC | 1–0 | Dynamo Dresden | Halle |
| | | | | Stadium: Leuna-Chemie-Stadion |

| 9 March 2024 29 | Preußen Münster | 1–0 | Hallescher FC |

| 16 March 2024 30 | Hallescher FC | 2–2 | SC Freiburg II | Halle |
| | | | | Stadium: Leuna-Chemie-Stadion |

| 30 March 2024 31 | Jahn Regensburg | 2–0 | Hallescher FC | Regensburg |

| 7 April 2024 32 | Hallescher FC | 0–2 | SSV Ulm | Halle |
| | | | | Stadium: Leuna-Chemie-Stadion |

| 13 April 2024 33 | Viktoria Köln | 4–2 | Hallescher FC | Cologne |
| 14:00 | Lorch 56'; Marseiler 75' (pen.); Anselm 77', 81' | | Skenderović 48'; Deniz 52' | Stadium: Sportpark Höhenberg; Referee: Lars Erbst |

| 20 April 2024 34 | Hallescher FC | 1–0 | SC Verl | Halle |
| 14:00 | Deniz 31' | | | Stadium: Leuna-Chemie-Stadion; Referee: Wolfgang Haslberger |

| 27 April 2024 35 | 1. FC Saarbrücken | 0–1 | Hallescher FC | Saarbrücken |
| 14:00 | | | Crosthwaite 79' | Stadium: Ludwigsparkstadion; Referee: Florian Lechner |

| 5 May 2024 36 | Hallescher FC | 0–1 | SpVgg Unterhaching | Halle |
| 16:30 | | | Hobsch 63' | Stadium: Leuna-Chemie-Stadion; Referee: Florian Exner |

| 11 May 2024 37 | Arminia Bielefeld | 0–0 | Hallescher FC | Bielefeld |
| 14:00 | | | | Stadium: SchücoArena; Referee: Patrick Alt |

| 18 May 2024 38 | Hallescher FC | 1–1 | Borussia Dortmund II | Halle |
| 13:30 | Skenderović 29' | | Roggow 14' | Stadium: Leuna-Chemie-Stadion; Referee: Felix Bickel |

=== DFB-Pokal ===
| 12 August 2023 First round | Hallescher FC | 0–1 | Greuther Fürth | Halle |
| 18:00 | Casar (yellow card) 17'; Berko (red card) 45+2'; Deniz (yellow card) 82' | Report | Sieb 18'; Jung (yellow card) 34'; Itter (yellow card) 36'; Michalski (yellow card) 42' | Stadium: Leuna-Chemie-Stadion; Attendance: 13,000; Referee: Florian Exner |

=== Saxony-Anhalt Cup ===
| 17 November 2023 Round of 16 | Union Sandersdorf | 0–1 | Hallescher FC | Sandersdorf-Brehna |
| 19:00 | | | Deniz 56' | Stadium: Sport- und Freizeitzentrum Sandersdorf; Attendance: 1,910; Referee: Jannis Körner |

| 23 March 2024 Quarter-finals | Stahl Thale | 1–5 | Hallescher FC | Thale |
| 14:00 | Zavjalovs 52' | | Lofolomo 28'; Kreuzer 40', 90+2'; Wolf 60'; Behrendt 90' | Stadium: Sportpark Thale; Attendance: 1,700; Referee: Max Goroncy |

| 14 May 2024 Semi-finals | VfL Halle | 0–2 | Hallescher FC | Halle |
| 19:30 | | | Wolf 49'; Nietfeld 66' (pen.) | Stadium: Leuna-Chemie-Stadion; Attendance: 4,289; Referee: Tim Kohnert |

| 25 May 2024 Final | Germania Halberstadt | 2–4 | Hallescher FC | Halle |
| 11:48 | | | | Stadium: Leuna-Chemie-Stadion; Attendance: 5,715; Referee: Julius Weiser |
