= 2023–24 1. FC Saarbrücken season =

1. FC Saarbrücken
2023–24 season
- Chairman: Hartmut Ostermann
- Manager: Rüdiger Ziehl
- Stadium: Ludwigsparkstadion
- 3. Liga: 6th
- DFB-Pokal: Semi-finals
- Saarland Cup: Quarter-finals
- Average home league attendance: 10,910
- Biggest win: Arminia Bielefeld 2–6 1. FC Saarbrücken

The 2023–24 season is 1. FC Saarbrücken's 121st season in existence and fourth consecutive in the 3. Liga. They are also currently competing in DFB-Pokal.

== Players ==
=== First-team squad ===
As of 2 September 2023

Note: Flags indicate national team as defined under FIFA eligibility rules; some limited exceptions apply. Players may hold more than one non-FIFA nationality.

No.	Pos.	Nation	Player
1	GK	GER	Tim Schreiber (on loan from RB Leipzig)
6	MF	GER	Patrick Sontheimer
8	MF	GER	Manuel Zeitz (captain)
9	FW	GER	Kai Brünker
10	FW	GER	Kasim Rabihic
11	MF	GER	Julius Biada
14	DF	MOZ	Boné Uaferro
16	DF	GER	Bjarne Thoelke
17	DF	GER	Dominik Becker
18	MF	GER	Andy Breuer
19	DF	GER	Marcel Gaus
20	FW	GER	Julian Günther-Schmidt
21	DF	GER	Fabio Di Michele Sanchez

No.	Pos.	Nation	Player
22	FW	GER	Simon Stehle
23	MF	ALB	Tim Civeja
24	FW	GER	Sebastian Jacob
27	DF	GER	Calogero Rizzuto
29	DF	GER	Lukas Boeder
30	GK	GER	Tim Paterok
31	MF	GER	Richard Neudecker
33	MF	GER	Luca Kerber
34	DF	GER	Frederik Recktenwald
35	GK	GER	Finn Kotyrba
39	FW	GER	Patrick Schmidt
25	FW	FRA	Amine Naïfi (on loan from Differdange)

== Transfers ==
=== In ===
Pos.	Player	Transferred from	Fee	Date	Source

=== Out ===
Pos.	Player	Transferred to	Fee	Date	Source

== Pre-season and friendlies ==
Win Draw Loss Fixtures

1 July 2023 Friendly	1. FC Saarbrücken (Germany)	4–0	(Luxembourg) Victoria Rosport

8 July 2023 Friendly	1. FC Saarbrücken (Germany)	4–1	(Germany) Mainz 05 II

15 July 2023 Friendly	1. FC Saarbrücken (Germany)	2–1	(Germany) 1. FC Nürnberg	Mulfingen
14:00 CEST (UTC+2)				Stadium: Arena Mulfingen-Hollenbach; Attendance: 300

19 July 2023 Friendly	SV Mettlach (Germany)	1–2	(Germany) 1. FC Saarbrücken

22 July 2023 Friendly	1. FC Saarbrücken (Germany)	1–2	(Germany) Borussia Mönchengladbach	Saarbrücken
15:00 CEST (UTC+2)	Brünker 85'		Čvančara 3'; Ngoumou 10'; Neuhaus (yellow card) 38'	Stadium: Stadion Ludwigspark; Attendance: 11,000; Referee: Tom Bauer

29 July 2023 Friendly	1. FC Saarbrücken (Germany)	2–1	(Luxembourg) Union Titus Pétange

== Competitions ==
=== Overall record ===
Competition	First match	Last match	Starting round	Final position	Record							
Competition	First match	Last match	Starting round	Final position	Pld	W	D	L	GF	GA	GD	Win %
3. Liga	6 August 2023	18 May 2024	Matchday 1		35	13	15	7	56	38	+18	37.14
DFB-Pokal	13 August 2023	2 April 2024	First round	Semi-finals	5	4	0	1	8	5	+3	80.00
Saarland Cup	15 November 2023		Fifth round		2	2	0	0	7	0	+7	100.00
Total					42	19	15	8	71	43	+28	45.24

Last updated: 27 April 2024
Source: Soccerway

=== 3. Liga ===
==== League table ====
Pos	Team	Pld	W	D	L	GF	GA	GD	Pts	Promotion, qualification or relegation
3	Jahn Regensburg (O, P)	38	17	12	9	51	42	+9	63	Qualification for promotion play-offs and DFB-Pokal
4	Dynamo Dresden	38	19	5	14	58	40	+18	62	Qualification for DFB-Pokal
5	1. FC Saarbrücken	38	15	15	8	60	43	+17	60	
6	Erzgebirge Aue	38	16	12	10	51	47	+4	60	
7	Rot-Weiss Essen	38	17	8	13	60	53	+7	59	

Source: DFB
Rules for classification: 1) Points; 2) Goal difference; 3) Goals scored; 4) Head-to-head results; 5) Head-to-head away goals scored; 6) Away goals scored; 7) Play-off.
(O) Play-off winners; (P) Promoted

==== Results summary ====
Overall								Home						Away					
Pld	W	D	L	GF	GA	GD	Pts	W	D	L	GF	GA	GD	W	D	L	GF	GA	GD
35	13	15	7	56	38	+18	54	7	7	4	26	20	+6	6	8	3	30	18	+12

Last updated: 27 April 2024.

==== Results by round ====
Round	1	2	3	4	5	6	7	8	9	10	11	12	13
Ground	A	H	H	A	H	A	H	A	H	A	H	A	H
Result	D	L	W	D	W	D	D	W	D	L	P	L	P
Position													

Updated to match(es) played on 27 April 2024. Source:
A = Away; H = Home; W = Win; D = Draw; L = Loss

==== Matches ====
The league fixtures were unveiled on 7 July 2023.

6 August 2023 1	SSV Ulm 1846	1–1	1. FC Saarbrücken	Ulm
13:30 UTC+2	Reichert 41'	Report	Brünker 3'	Stadium: Donaustadion; Attendance: 9,543; Referee: Nicolas Winter

19 August 2023 2	1. FC Saarbrücken	1–2	Viktoria Köln	Saarbrücken
14:00 UTC+2	Brünker 18'	Report	Schultz 31'; Marseiler 52'	Stadium: Ludwigsparkstadion; Attendance: 9,233; Referee: Martin Speckner

23 August 2023 3	1. FC Saarbrücken	4–3	SC Verl	Saarbrücken
19:00 UTC+2	Rabihic 4' (pen.); Schmidt 60'; Brünker 76'; Becker 90+1'	Report	Paetow 34'; Lokotsch 36'; Batista Meier 54'	Stadium: Ludwigsparkstadion; Attendance: 9,026; Referee: Assad Nouhoum

26 August 2023 4	FC Ingolstadt	2–2	1. FC Saarbrücken	Ingolstadt
14:00 UTC+2	Kanuric 28'; Mause 60'	Report	Schmidt 29', 56'	Stadium: Audi-Sportpark; Attendance: 4,006; Referee: Felix Weller

1 September 2023 5	1. FC Saarbrücken	2–0	Borussia Dortmund II	Saarbrücken
19:00 UTC+2	Rabihic 37'; Brünker 58'	Report		Stadium: Ludwigsparkstadion; Attendance: 11,065; Referee: Mario Hildenbrand

17 September 2023 6	SpVgg Unterhaching	0–0	1. FC Saarbrücken	Unterhaching
19:30 UTC+2		Report		Stadium: Sportpark Unterhaching; Attendance: 4,250; Referee: Felix Bickel

23 September 2023 7	1. FC Saarbrücken	1–1	Waldhof Mannheim	Saarbrücken
14:00 UTC+2	Brünker 88'	Report	Herrmann 74'	Stadium: Ludwigsparkstadion; Attendance: 14,151; Referee: Alexander Sather

29 September 2023 8	Arminia Bielefeld	2–6	1. FC Saarbrücken	Bielefeld
19:00 UTC+2	Klos 41'; Yıldırım 81'	Report	Neudecker 43'; Kerber 51'; Brünker 68'; Gaus 80'; Stehle 89'; Boeder 90+3'	Stadium: SchücoArena; Attendance: 17,215; Referee: Michael Bacher

3 October 2023 9	1. FC Saarbrücken	1–1	VfB Lübeck	Saarbrücken
19:00 UTC+2	Naïfi 90+9'	Report	Löhden 10'	Stadium: Ludwigsparkstadion; Attendance: 10,666; Referee: Tobias Wittmann

7 October 2023 10	Erzgebirge Aue	2–0	1. FC Saarbrücken	Aue
16:30 UTC+2	Tashchy 65'; Seitz 74'	Report		Stadium: Erzgebirgsstadion; Attendance: 8,006; Referee: Timo Ganslowitz

22 October 2023 12	Rot-Weiss Essen	2–1	1. FC Saarbrücken	Essen
16:30 UTC+2	Young 7'; Vonić 18'	Report	Naïfi 40'	Stadium: Stadion an der Hafenstraße; Attendance: 17,217; Referee: Assad Nouhoum

4 November 2023 14	SV Sandhausen	2–2	1. FC Saarbrücken	Sandhausen
14:00 UTC+1	Hennings 45+1'; Ben Balla 90+4'	Report	Zeitz 24'; Rabihic 48' (pen.)	Stadium: Hardtwaldstadion; Attendance: 4,889; Referee: Robin Braun

11 November 2023 15	1. FC Saarbrücken	2–3	1860 Munich	Saarbrücken
14:00 UTC+1	Zeitz 39'; Naïfi 41'	Report	Schröter 4', 16'; Lang 82'	Stadium: Ludwigsparkstadion; Attendance: 10,894; Referee: Lars Erbst

19 November 2023 13	1. FC Saarbrücken	v	Dynamo Dresden	Saarbrücken
13:30 UTC+1		Report		Stadium: Ludwigsparkstadion
Note: The match was suspended at half-time due to a waterlogged pitch.

25 November 2023 16	Hallescher FC	0-2	1. FC Saarbrücken	Halle (Saale)
14:00 UTC+1		Report	Brunker 19'; Uaferro 41'	Stadium: Erdgas Sportpark

29 November 2023 11	1. FC Saarbrücken	v	MSV Duisburg	Saarbrücken
19:00 UTC+1		Report		Stadium: Ludwigsparkstadion
Note: The match was postponed to too many assignments for the Germany under-20 football team.

=== DFB-Pokal ===
11 August 2023 First round	1. FC Saarbrücken	2–1	Karlsruher SC	Saarbrücken
18:00 UTC+2	Civeja 47'; Brünker 90+1'	Report	Stindl 65'	Stadium: Ludwigsparkstadion; Referee: Arne Aarnink

1 November 2023 Second round	1. FC Saarbrücken	2–1	Bayern Munich	Saarbrücken
20:45 UTC+1	Sontheimer 45+1'; Gaus 90+6'	Report	Müller 16'	Stadium: Ludwigsparkstadion; Attendance: 16,003; Referee: Frank Willenborg

6 December 2023 Round of 16	1. FC Saarbrücken	2–0	Eintracht Frankfurt	Saarbrücken
18:00 UTC+1	Brünker 64'; Kerber 78'	Report		Stadium: Ludwigsparkstadion; Attendance: 15,905; Referee: Daniel Siebert

12 March 2024 Quarter-finals	1. FC Saarbrücken	2-1	Borussia Mönchengladbach	Saarbrücken
20:45 UTC+1	Naïfi 11' Brünker 90+3'	Report	Hack 8'	Stadium: Ludwigsparkstadion; Attendance: 15,903; Referee: Robert Hartmann

=== Saarland Cup ===
15 November 2023 Fifth round	TuS Herrensohr	0-3	1. FC Saarbrücken	Püttlingen
19:00 UTC+1		Report	Luca Kerber 9'; Julian Günther-Schmidt 27'; Kai Brünker 53'	Stadium: Stadion an der Burg; Referee: Frank Distler
