= 2022–23 1. FC Saarbrücken season =

1. FC Saarbrücken
2022–23 season
- Stadium: Ludwigsparkstadion
- 3. Liga: TBD
- Saarland Cup: TBD
- Top goalscorer: TBD
- Highest home attendance: TBD
Home colours	Away colours	Third colours

The 2022–23 1. FC Saarbrücken season will be the 116th season in the club's football history. They will play in the 3. Liga, their third consecutive season in the third tier since being promoted from the Regionalliga. They also will participate in the Saarland Cup.

== Transfers ==
=== In ===
Pos	Player	Transferred from	Fee	Date	Source
GK	(Germany) Tim Paterok	(Germany) VfR Aalen	Free transfer	17 May 2022	
FW	(Germany) Kasim Rabihic	(Germany) SC Verl	Free transfer	24 May 2022	
FW	(Germany) Julius Biada	(Germany) SV Sandhausen	Undisclosed	25 May 2022	
MF	(Germany) Mike Frantz	(Germany) Hannover 96	Free transfer	1 June 2022	
MF	(Germany) Richard Neudecker	(Germany) TSV 1860 Munich	Undisclosed	3 June 2022	
MF	(Germany) Tobias Schwede	(Germany) Hansa Rostock	Undisclosed	16 June 2022	
FW	(Albania) Marvin Çuni	(Germany) Bayern Munich II	Loan	24 June 2022	
GK	(Germany) Julian Bauer	(Germany) Eintracht Braunschweig	Free transfer	24 June 2022	

=== Out ===
Pos	Player	Transferred to	Fee	Date	Source
GK	(Germany) Jonas Hupe		Contract terminated	1 June 2022	
FW	(Germany) Tim Korzuschek	(Germany) Alemannia Aachen	Undisclosed	1 June 2022	
GK	(Germany) Marcel Johnen	(Germany) Alemannia Aachen	Undisclosed	10 June 2022	

== Competitions ==
=== Friendlies ===
26 June 2021	Spvgg Quierschied	0–3	FC Saarbrücken	Quierschied
		Report	Günther-Schmidt 26'; Rabihic 32'; Steinkötter 48'	Stadium: Sportplatz Quierschied; Attendance: 1,050

25 June 2022	Swift Hesperange	2–2	FC Saarbrücken	Hesperange
	Jacob 44' (o.g.); Philippe 47'	Report	Walle 26'; Günther-Schmidt 86'	Stadium: Stade Alphonse Theis; Attendance: 700

2 July 2022	FK Pirmasens	1–1	FC Saarbrücken	Saarbrücken
	Eichhorn 81'	Report	Jacob 79'	Stadium: Kunstrasenplatz Bischmisheim; Attendance: 1,500

9 July 2022	Karlsruher SC	2–3	FC Saarbrücken	Karlsruhe
	Wanitzek 32'; Rapp 37'	Report	Jacob 39', 44'; Çuni 88'	Stadium: Grenke Stadion; Attendance: 500

13 July 2022	SV Oberachern	0–6	FC Saarbrücken	Achern
		Report	Grimaldi 19'; Neudecker 43'; Çuni 49', 54', 56', 66'	Stadium: Waldsportplatz; Attendance: 600

=== 3. Liga ===
==== Table ====
Pos	Team	Pld	W	D	L	GF	GA	GD	Pts	Promotion, qualification or relegation
3	VfL Osnabrück (P)	38	21	7	10	70	49	+21	70	Promotion to 2. Bundesliga and qualification for DFB-Pokal
4	Wehen Wiesbaden (O, P)	38	21	7	10	71	51	+20	70	Qualification for promotion play-offs and DFB-Pokal
5	1. FC Saarbrücken	38	20	9	9	64	39	+25	69	Qualification for DFB-Pokal
6	Dynamo Dresden	38	20	9	9	65	44	+21	69	
7	Waldhof Mannheim	38	19	3	16	63	65	−2	60	

Source: DFB
Rules for classification: 1) Points; 2) Goal difference; 3) Goals scored; 4) Head-to-head results; 5) Head-to-head away goals scored; 6) Away goals scored; 7) Play-off.
(O) Play-off winners; (P) Promoted

==== Matches ====
23 July 2022	FC Saarbrücken	1–0	SC Verl	Saarbrücken
				Stadium: Ludwigsparkstadion

6 August 2022	SV Elversberg	0–2	FC Saarbrücken	Spiesen-Elversberg
				Stadium: Waldstadion an der Kaiserlinde

10 August 2022	FC Saarbrücken	1–0	Borussia Dortmund II	Saarbrücken
				Stadium: Ludwigsparkstadion

13 August 2022	FC Ingolstadt 04	0–0	FC Saarbrücken	Ingolstadt
				Stadium: Audi Sportpark

20 August 2022	FC Saarbrücken	0–0	Erzgebirge Aue	Saarbrücken
				Stadium: Ludwigsparkstadion

27 August 2022	VfL Osnabrück	2–2	FC Saarbrücken	Osnabrück
				Stadium: Stadion an der Bremer Brücke

5 September 2022	FC Saarbrücken	2–2	Wehen Wiesbaden	Saarbrücken
				Stadium: Ludwigsparkstadion

10 September 2022	SpVgg Bayreuth	0–6	FC Saarbrücken	Bayreuth
				Stadium: Hans-Walter-Wild-Stadion

19 September 2022	Rot-Weiss Essen	1–0	FC Saarbrücken	Essen
				Stadium: Stadion an der Hafenstraße

1 October 2022	SC Freiburg II	2–2	FC Saarbrücken	Saarbrücken
				Stadium: Ludwigsparkstadion

8 October 2022	SV Waldhof Mannheim	1–0	FC Saarbrücken	Mannheim
				Stadium: Carl-Benz-Stadion

15 October 2022	FC Saarbrücken	3–2	SV Waldhof Mannheim	Saarbrücken
				Stadium: Ludwigsparkstadion

22 October 2022	Dynamo Dresden	1–2	FC Saarbrücken	Dresden
				Stadium: Rudolf-Harbig-Stadion

29 October 2022	FC Saarbrücken	0–0	SV Meppen	Saarbrücken
				Stadium: Ludwigsparkstadion

6 November 2022	TSV 1860 Munich	0–1	FC Saarbrücken	Munich
				Stadium: Grünwalder Stadion

12 November 2022	Hallescher FC	1–2	FC Saarbrücken	Halle
				Stadium: Leuna Chemie Stadion

1 January 2023	FC Saarbrücken	2–3	MSV Duisburg	Saarbrücken
				Stadium: Ludwigsparkstadion

20 January 2023	FC Viktoria Köln	0–2	FC Saarbrücken	Cologne
				Stadium: Sportpark Höhenberg

28 January 2023	SC Verl	2–0	FC Saarbrücken	Verl
				Stadium: Sportclub Arena

2 February 2023	FC Saarbrücken	0–4	SV Elversberg	Saarbrücken
				Stadium: Ludwigsparkstadion

11 February 2023	Borussia Dortmund II	1–2	FC Saarbrücken	Dortmund
				Stadium: Stadion Rote Erde

18 February 2023	FC Saarbrücken	3–4	FC Ingolstadt 04	Saarbrücken
				Stadium: Ludwigsparkstadion
