= Dominik Becker =

German footballer (born 2000)

Personal information
- Date of birth: 9 January 2000 (age 26)
- Place of birth: Koblenz, Germany
- Height: 1.88 m (6 ft 2 in)
- Position: Defender

Team information
- Current team: Rot-Weiß Erfurt
- Number: 25

Youth career
- –2013: TuS Koblenz
- 2013–2019: 1. FC Köln

Senior career*
Years	Team	Apps	(Gls)
2019–2021	Werder Bremen II	33	(0)
2021–2023	Werder Bremen	0	(0)
2022–2023	→ 1. FC Saarbrücken (loan)	24	(0)
2023–2025	1. FC Saarbrücken	47	(3)
2026	MSV Duisburg	1	(0)
2026–	Rot-Weiß Erfurt	1	(0)

International career
2017	Germany U17	11	(1)
- * Club domestic league appearances and goals as of 23 September 2026

Dominik Becker (born 9 January 2000) is a German professional footballer who plays as a defender for Rot-Weiß Erfurt.

== Club career ==
In 2013 Becker moved from TuS Koblenz to join 1. FC Köln. Becker signed for Werder Bremen II from 1. FC Köln in May 2019. He played 33 games for Werder II in the Regionalliga Nord before he joined 1. FC Saarbrücken on loan in 2022. Becker made his first professional appearance when he started on 28 February 2022 in the 3. Liga against Türkgücü München in a 5–1 victory for his side.

On 26 June 2023, 1. FC Saarbrücken signed Becker on a permanent basis after an 18-months loan.

On 2 February 2026, Becker signed with MSV Duisburg. He left Duisburg at the end of the 2025–26 season. He moved to Rot-Weiß Erfurt for 2026–27.

== International career ==
Becker was a member of the Germany U17 national team squad at the 2017 FIFA U-17 World Cup.

== Career statistics ==
As of 23 September 2026

Appearances and goals by club, season and competition
Club	Season	League			Cup		Other		Total	
Club	Season	Division	Apps	Goals	Apps	Goals	Apps	Goals	Apps	Goals
Werder Bremen II	2019–20	Regionalliga Nord	24	0	—		—		24	0
Werder Bremen II	2020–21	Regionalliga Nord	4	0	—		—		4	0
Werder Bremen II	2021–22	Regionalliga Nord	5	0	—		—		5	0
Werder Bremen II	Total		33	0	—		—		33	0
1. FC Saarbrücken (loan)	2021–22	3. Liga	9	0	—		—		9	0
1. FC Saarbrücken (loan)	2022–23	3. Liga	15	0	0	0	—		15	0
1. FC Saarbrücken (loan)	Total		24	0	0	0	—		24	0
1. FC Saarbrücken	2023–24	3. Liga	25	3	3	0	—		28	3
1. FC Saarbrücken	2024–25	3. Liga	22	0	0	0	2 (Note: Appearances in promotion playoffs)	0	24	0
1. FC Saarbrücken	Total		47	3	3	0	2	0	52	3
MSV Duisburg	2025–26	3. Liga	1	0	—		—		1	0
FC Rot-Weiß Erfurt	2026–27	Regionalliga Nordost	1	0	—		—		1	0
Career total			106	3	3	0	2	0	111	3
