= Lee Gwang-in =

South Korean footballer

Personal information
- Date of birth: 1 July 2001 (age 25)
- Height: 1.75 m (5 ft 9 in)
- Position: Forward

Team information
- Current team: SGV Heilbronn-Freiberg
- Number: 17

Youth career
- 2011–2013: Oedo Elementary School
- 2014–2015: Ulsan Hyundai
- 2016: Paju City
- 2017: Suwon Samsung Bluewings
- 2018–2019: Yongdungpo Technical HS

Senior career*
Years	Team	Apps	(Gls)
2020–2022	Mafra	23	(1)
2022	→ FC St. Pauli II (loan)	6	(0)
2022–2024	FC St. Pauli II	53	(10)
2024–2025	FSV Frankfurt	23	(2)
2025–2026	TSV Steinbach Haiger	23	(10)
2026–	SGV Heilbronn-Freiberg	8	(5)

International career^{‡}
- South Korea U13
- South Korea U14
2017	South Korea U16		
- * Club domestic league appearances and goals as of 24 September 2026 ‡ National team caps and goals as of 15 September 2020

- Lee Gwang-in
- Hangul: 이광인
- RR: I Gwangin
- MR: I Kwangin

Lee Gwang-in (Korean: 이광인; born 1 July 2001) is a South Korean footballer who plays as a forward for SGV Heilbronn-Freiberg.

== Career statistics ==
=== Club ===
As of 7 December 2020

Appearances and goals by club, season and competition
Club	Season	League			National cup		League cup		Other		Total	
Club	Season	Division	Apps	Goals	Apps	Goals	Apps	Goals	Apps	Goals	Apps	Goals
Mafra	2020–21	LigaPro	20	1	1 (Note: Appearances in the Taça de Portugal)	0	0	0	0	0	7	1
Career total			20	1	1	0	0	0	0	0	7	1
