= SGV Heilbronn-Freiberg =

German football club

- Full name: Sport- und Gemeinschaftsverein Heilbronn-Freiberg Fußball e.V.
- Founded: 26 October 1973
- Ground: Frankenstadion Heilbronn
- Capacity: 17,284
- Chairman: Emir Cerkez
- Manager: Kushtrim Lushtaku
- League: Regionalliga Südwest (IV)
- 2025–26: Regionalliga Südwest, 2nd of 18
Home colours	Away colours

SGV Heilbronn-Freiberg is a German association football club from the city of Freiberg am Neckar, Baden-Württemberg.

== History ==
The club was formed out of the 1973 union of SGV Heutingsheim and TSV Beihingen. The roots of the Heutingsheim club go back to the establishment of FC Spartania Heutingsheim on 28 January 1913. This club fused briefly with SV Beihingen in 1919 to form FV Beihingen-Heutingsheim before the two went their separate ways again within a year. Spartania then formed a new partnership with TV Heutingsheim and RFV Wanderlust Heutingsheim in 1921 to create SV Heutingsheim. RFV left the association in 1926, while ASV TV Heutingsheim joined in 1933. Following World War II occupying Allied authorities banned all organizations in Germany, including sports and football clubs. The sports club was re-established in 1945 as SGV Heutingsheim.

TSV Beihingen made a fleeting appearance in the Amateurliga Württemberg (IV) in 1961–62 before the merger that formed SGV. The combined side was in and out of the Amateurliga Württemberg (V) through the course of the 90s. Since winning promotion to the Oberliga Baden-Württemberg (IV) on the strength of a Verbandsliga Württemberg (V) title in 2001 the football team has earned lower table results, eventually being relegated back to the Verbandsliga in 2011. It made an immediate return to the Oberliga after winning another Verbandsliga title and played there for four seasons with a third-place finish in 2014–15 as its best result but being relegated the following season.

In July 2013, Freiberg played a friendly match against Bundesliga side TSG 1899 Hoffenheim to mark SGV's 100-year anniversary, surprisingly beating them 2–1 thanks to goals from Spetim Muzliukaj and Ouadie Barini.

SGV plays its home matches at the Wasenstadion which has a capacity of 4,000 (800 seats).

In addition to its football side SGV has departments for accordion, basketball, gymnastics, Kung Fu, swimming, theatre, and volleyball.

On 1 July 2026 the club changed its name to SGV Heilbronn-Freiberg to reflect the club now playing its home matches in Heilbronn.

== Honours ==
- Verbandsliga Württemberg (V)
  - Champions: 2001, 2012, 2017

== Players ==
As of 8 September 2026

Note: Flags indicate national team as defined under FIFA eligibility rules; some limited exceptions apply. Players may hold more than one non-FIFA nationality.

No.	Pos.	Nation	Player
1	GK	GER	Benedikt Grawe
2	DF	CRO	Tino Bradara
3	DF	GER	David Kammerbauer
4	DF	GER	Marshall Faleu
5	DF	GER	Paul Polauke
6	MF	GER	Lukas Laupheimer
7	FW	GER	Julian Kudala
8	MF	GER	Michael Martin
9	FW	GER	Justin Steinkötter
10	MF	ROU	Leon Petö
11	FW	GER	Marius Köhl
13	MF	GER	James Ojiekhai
14	DF	GER	Linus Weik
15	FW	GER	Joel Malungo
17	MF	KOR	Lee Gwang-in

No.	Pos.	Nation	Player
18	MF	GER	Melvin Cerkez
19	FW	GER	Minos Gouras
20	FW	FRA	Matt Zié
21	MF	GER	Tim-Niklas Pietzsch
22	MF	GER	Tim Latteier
23	MF	GER	Merveille Biankadi
24	DF	GER	Jeremias Lorch
27	DF	FRA	Abou Ballo
28	DF	CAN	Scott Kennedy
30	DF	SRB	Srdjan Groznica
40	GK	GER	Ante Eljuga
44	DF	GER	Adam Krstanovic
77	FW	CUW	Meghon Valpoort
99	FW	AUT	Marlon Mustapha

=== Out on loan ===
Note: Flags indicate national team as defined under FIFA eligibility rules; some limited exceptions apply. Players may hold more than one non-FIFA nationality.

No.	Pos.	Nation	Player

== Recent seasons ==
The recent season-by-season performance of the club:

Season	Division	Tier	Position
1999–2000	Verbandsliga Württemberg	V	9th
2000–01	Verbandsliga Württemberg	V	1st ↑
2001–02	Oberliga Baden-Württemberg	IV	13th
2002–03	Oberliga Baden-Württemberg	IV	11th
2003–04	Oberliga Baden-Württemberg	IV	14th
2004–05	Oberliga Baden-Württemberg	IV	14th
2005–06	Oberliga Baden-Württemberg	IV	7th
2006–07	Oberliga Baden-Württemberg	IV	5th
2007–08	Oberliga Baden-Württemberg	IV	12th
2008–09	Oberliga Baden-Württemberg	V	11th
2009–10	Oberliga Baden-Württemberg	V	8th
2010–11	Oberliga Baden-Württemberg	V	15th ↓
2011–12	Verbandsliga Württemberg	VI	1st ↑
2012–13	Oberliga Baden-Württemberg	V	5th
2013–14	Oberliga Baden-Württemberg	V	4th
2014–15	Oberliga Baden-Württemberg	V	3rd
2015–16	Oberliga Baden-Württemberg	V	15th ↓
2016–17	Verbandsliga Württemberg	VI	1st ↑
2017–18	Oberliga Baden-Württemberg	V	3rd
2018–19	Oberliga Baden-Württemberg	V	7th
2019–20	Oberliga Baden-Württemberg	V	16th
2020–21	Oberliga Baden-Württemberg	V	–
2021–22	Oberliga Baden-Württemberg	V	1st ↑
2022–23	Regionalliga Südwest	IV	14th
2023–24	Regionalliga Südwest	IV	4th
2024–25	Regionalliga Südwest	IV	3rd
2025–26	Regionalliga Südwest	IV	2nd

- With the introduction of the Regionalligas in 1994 and the 3. Liga in 2008 as the new third tier, below the 2. Bundesliga, all leagues below dropped one tier.

↑ Promoted	↓ Relegated
