= Marcel Gaus =

German footballer

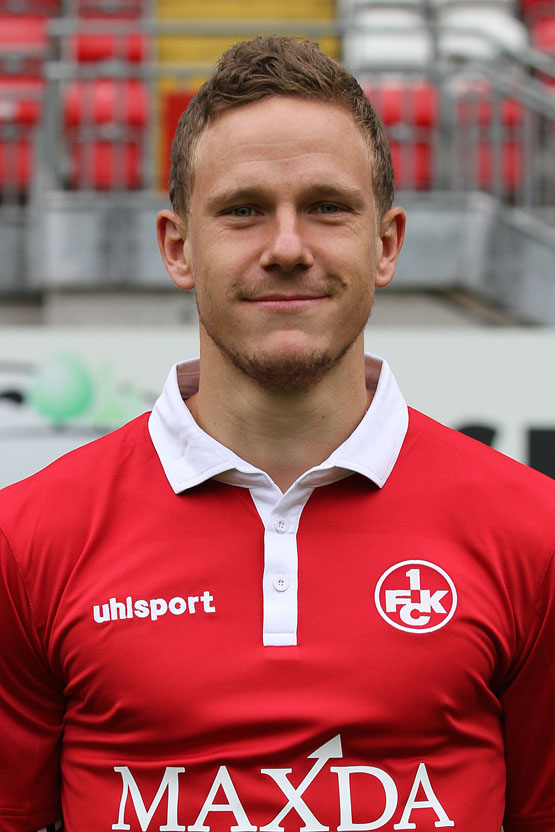
- Gaus with 1. FC Kaiserslautern in 2015

Personal information
- Date of birth: 2 August 1989 (age 37)
- Place of birth: Hagen, West Germany
- Height: 1.81 m (5 ft 11 in)
- Position: Left-back

Youth career
- 2001–2007: SV Hilden-Nord
- 2007–2008: Fortuna Düsseldorf

Senior career*
Years	Team	Apps	(Gls)
2007–2011	Fortuna Düsseldorf II	34	(11)
2008–2011	Fortuna Düsseldorf	40	(5)
2011–2013	FSV Frankfurt	38	(5)
2013–2017	1. FC Kaiserslautern	88	(12)
2017–2022	FC Ingolstadt	135	(16)
2023–2024	1. FC Saarbrücken	48	(4)
- * Club domestic league appearances and goals

Marcel Gaus (born 2 August 1989) is a German former professional footballer who played as a left-back.

== Club career ==
Gaus began his career on youth side for SV Hilden-Nord and joined later in the youth team of Fortuna Düsseldorf. On 12 May 2005, made his debut for Fortuna Düsseldorf II in the Oberliga Nordrhein and his professional debut on 2 August 2008 against Stuttgarter Kickers.

In January 2023, Gaus signed for 1. FC Saarbrücken on a contract until the end of the season. Later that year, on 1 November, he scored the winning goal in the 96th minute — 6th minute of stoppage time — which secured a 2–1 victory for Saarbrücken over Bayern Munich in the DFB-Pokal second round.

== Career statistics ==
As of match played 1 November 2023

Club statistics
Club	Season	League			Cup		Other		Total	
Club	Season	Division	Apps	Goals	Apps	Goals	Apps	Goals	Apps	Goals
Fortuna Düsseldorf	2008–09	3. Liga	4	0	0	0	—		4	0
Fortuna Düsseldorf	2009–10	2. Bundesliga	19	4	0	0	—		19	4
Fortuna Düsseldorf	2010–11	2. Bundesliga	17	1	1	0	—		18	1
Fortuna Düsseldorf	Total		40	5	1	0	0	0	41	5
Fortuna Düsseldorf II	2009–10	Regionalliga West	9	5	—				9	5
Fortuna Düsseldorf II	2010–11	Regionalliga West	11	4	—				11	4
Fortuna Düsseldorf II	Total		20	9	0	0	0	0	20	9
FSV Frankfurt	2011–12	2. Bundesliga	29	3	2	0	—		31	3
FSV Frankfurt	2012–13	2. Bundesliga	9	2	0	0	—		9	2
FSV Frankfurt	Total		38	5	2	0	0	0	40	5
FSV Frankfurt II	2011–12	Regionalliga Süd	4	0	—				4	0
FSV Frankfurt II	2012–13	Regionalliga Südwest	4	1	—				4	1
FSV Frankfurt II	Total		8	1	0	0	0	0	8	1
1. FC Kaiserslautern	2013–14	2. Bundesliga	25	3	3	3	—		28	6
1. FC Kaiserslautern	2014–15	2. Bundesliga	10	2	1	0	—		11	2
1. FC Kaiserslautern	2015–16	2. Bundesliga	22	2	1	0	—		23	2
1. FC Kaiserslautern	2016–17	2. Bundesliga	31	5	1	0	—		32	5
1. FC Kaiserslautern	Total		88	12	6	3	0	0	94	15
FC Ingolstadt 04	2017–18	2. Bundesliga	30	2	2	0	—		32	2
FC Ingolstadt 04	2018–19	2. Bundesliga	20	3	0	0	2 (Note: Appearances in 2. Bundesliga relegation play-offs)	0	22	3
FC Ingolstadt 04	2019–20	3. Liga	34	5	1	0	3 (Note: Two appearances in 2. Bundesliga relegation play-offs and one appearance in Bavarian Cup)	0	38	5
FC Ingolstadt 04	2020–21	3. Liga	30	5	1	0	3 (Note: Two appearances in 2. Bundesliga relegation play-offs and one appearance and a goal in Bavarian Cup)	1	34	6
FC Ingolstadt 04	2021–22	3. Liga	21	1	1	0	—		22	1
FC Ingolstadt 04	Total	3. Liga	135	16	5	0	8	1	148	17
1. FC Saarbrücken	2022–23	3. Liga	14	2	0	0	3 (Note: Appearances in Saarland Cup)	0	17	2
1. FC Saarbrücken	2023–24	3. Liga	11	1	2	1	0	0	13	2
1. FC Saarbrücken	Total	3. Liga	25	3	2	1	3	0	30	4
Career totals			354	51	16	4	11	1	381	56
