= Nick Galle =

German footballer

Personal information
- Date of birth: 14 September 1998 (age 28)
- Place of birth: Germany
- Height: 1.86 m (6 ft 1 in)
- Position: Left-back

Team information
- Current team: TSV Steinbach
- Number: 3

Youth career
- 1. JFS Köln
- –2017: 1. FC Köln
- 2017: Viktoria Köln

Senior career*
Years	Team	Apps	(Gls)
2017–2019	Fortuna Düsseldorf II	40	(1)
2019–2020	Hallescher FC	2	(0)
2020–2021	Alemannia Aachen	31	(1)
2021–2022	1. FC Saarbrücken	14	(0)
2022–2023	Wuppertaler SV	26	(2)
2023–	TSV Steinbach	73	(5)
- * Club domestic league appearances and goals as of 24 September 2026

Nick Galle (born 14 September 1998) is a German professional footballer who plays as a left-back for TSV Steinbach.

== Career ==
=== Hallescher FC ===
In May 2019, Galle joined Hallescher FC on a free transfer from Fortuna Düsseldorf II.

Galle made his professional debut for Hallescher FC in the 3. Liga on 31 July 2019, starting in the away match against Viktoria Köln which finished as a 2–0 win.

=== Alemannia Aachen ===
On 6 October 2021, Galle joined Regionalliga club Alemannia Aachen.

=== 1. FC Saarbrücken ===
On 11 May 2021, it was announced that Galle would join 1. FC Saarbrücken for the 2021–22 season.

=== Wuppertaler SV ===
On 27 January 2022, Galle moved to Wuppertaler SV in Regionalliga West.

=== TSV Steinbach ===
On 27 April 2023, Galle signed a contract with TSV Steinbach from the upcoming season, on a two-year deal.
