= Tim Civeja =

Albanian footballer

Personal information
- Date of birth: 4 January 2002 (age 24)
- Place of birth: Dachau, Germany
- Height: 1.80 m (5 ft 11 in)
- Position: Central midfielder

Team information
- Current team: Karlsruher SC
- Number: 23

Youth career
- –2015: TaF Glonntal
- 2015–2020: FC Augsburg

Senior career*
Years	Team	Apps	(Gls)
2020–2023	FC Augsburg	3	(0)
2021–2023	FC Augsburg II	17	(2)
2022–2023	→ FC Ingolstadt 04 (loan)	13	(2)
2022–2023	→ FC Ingolstadt 04 II (loan)	4	(1)
2023–2026	1. FC Saarbrücken	97	(14)
2026–	Karlsruher SC	8	(2)

International career^{‡}
2019	Germany U18	1	(0)
2020	Germany U19	1	(0)
2023	Albania U21	5	(0)
- * Club domestic league appearances and goals as of 8 November 2026 ‡ National team caps and goals as of 18 October 2024

Tim Civeja (born 4 January 2002) is an Albanian professional footballer who plays as a central midfielder for 2. Bundesliga club Karlsruher SC.

He began his senior career with FC Augsburg and later played for FC Ingolstadt 04 and 1. FC Saarbrücken, making 110 appearances in the 3. Liga before joining Karlsruhe in 2026.

Born in Germany, to Albanian parents, Civeja represented Germany at under-18 and under-19 level before switching his international allegiance and playing for the Albania under-21.

== Club career ==
Civeja played youth football for TaF Glonntal before joining the academy of FC Augsburg in 2015. He made his professional debut for Augsburg in the Bundesliga on 16 January 2021, coming on as an 87th-minute substitute for Rani Khedira in a 2–0 away defeat to Werder Bremen. He also featured for Augsburg's reserve team in the Regionalliga Bayern, making 17 appearances and scoring twice during the 2021–22 season.

On 23 June 2022, Civeja joined FC Ingolstadt 04 on a season-long loan. He made 13 appearances and scored twice in the 3. Liga during the 2022–23 season.

On 4 July 2023, Civeja signed for 1. FC Saarbrücken. During the 2023–24 season, he made 31 league appearances and scored four goals. He scored his first competitive goal for the club on 11 August 2023, opening the scoring in a 2–1 DFB-Pokal first-round victory over his former club Karlsruher SC. Saarbrücken reached the semi-finals of the competition, eliminating FC Bayern Munich, Eintracht Frankfurt and Borussia Mönchengladbach before losing to 1. FC Kaiserslautern.

During the 2024–25 season, Civeja made 31 league appearances, including 14 starts, scoring five goals and providing two assists. He scored and assisted a goal in a 4–0 win over TSV 1860 Munich on 18 January 2025. Saarbrücken finished third and qualified for the promotion play-offs against Eintracht Braunschweig. Civeja featured in both legs, but the club lost 4–2 on aggregate and missed promotion to the 2. Bundesliga.

In his final season, Civeja made 35 league appearances, scoring five goals and providing seven assists. He left Saarbrücken after three seasons, having made more than 30 league appearances in each campaign, to join Karlsruher SC in June 2026.

On 4 June 2026, Civeja joined Karlsruher SC of the 2. Bundesliga. On 31 October, he scored his first goal for the club in a 2–1 win over 1. FC Heidenheim, opening the scoring in the 19th minute after receiving a pass from Marvin Wanitzek and beating three defenders before finishing. On 8 November, he scored from approximately 51 metres in a 3–2 away defeat to VfL Bochum, briefly putting Karlsruhe ahead in the second half. He was subsequently named in kicker's Team of the Week.

== International career ==
Civeja has appeared for the Germany under-18 in 2018 and under-19 in 2019 national teams.

Civeja switched his international allegiance to Albania, making his debut for the under-21 team in June 2023. He made four appearances, three as a starter, during the 2025 UEFA European Under-21 Championship qualification. Albania finished fourth in Group E with 16 points, four behind second-placed Finland, who advanced to the play-offs.

== Personal life ==
Civeja was born in Dachau, Bavaria, and is of Albanian descent. His father is from Berat and his mother is from Kuçovë.

== Career statistics ==
=== Club ===
As of match played 8 November 2026

Appearances and goals by club, season and competition
Club	Season	League			National cup (Note: Includes DFB-Pokal.)		Promotion play-offs		Total	
Club	Season	Division	Apps	Goals	Apps	Goals	Apps	Goals	Apps	Goals
FC Augsburg	2020–21	Bundesliga	3	0	0	0	—		3	0
FC Augsburg II	2021–22	Regionalliga Bayern	17	2	—		—		17	2
FC Ingolstadt 04 (loan)	2022–23	3. Liga	13	2	0	0	—		13	2
FC Ingolstadt 04 II (loan)	2022–23	Oberliga	4	1	—		—		4	1
Eintracht Stadtallendorf	2022–23	Oberliga	1	0	—		—		1	0
1. FC Saarbrücken	2023–24	3. Liga	31	4	4	1	—		35	5
1. FC Saarbrücken	2024–25	3. Liga	31	5	1	0	2	0	34	5
1. FC Saarbrücken	2025–26	3. Liga	35	5	1	1	—		36	6
1. FC Saarbrücken	Total		97	14	6	2	2	0	105	16
Karlsruher SC	2026–27	2. Bundesliga	8	2	2	0	—		10	2
Career total			143	21	8	2	2	0	153	23
