= Meris Skenderović =

Montenegrin footballer (born 1998)

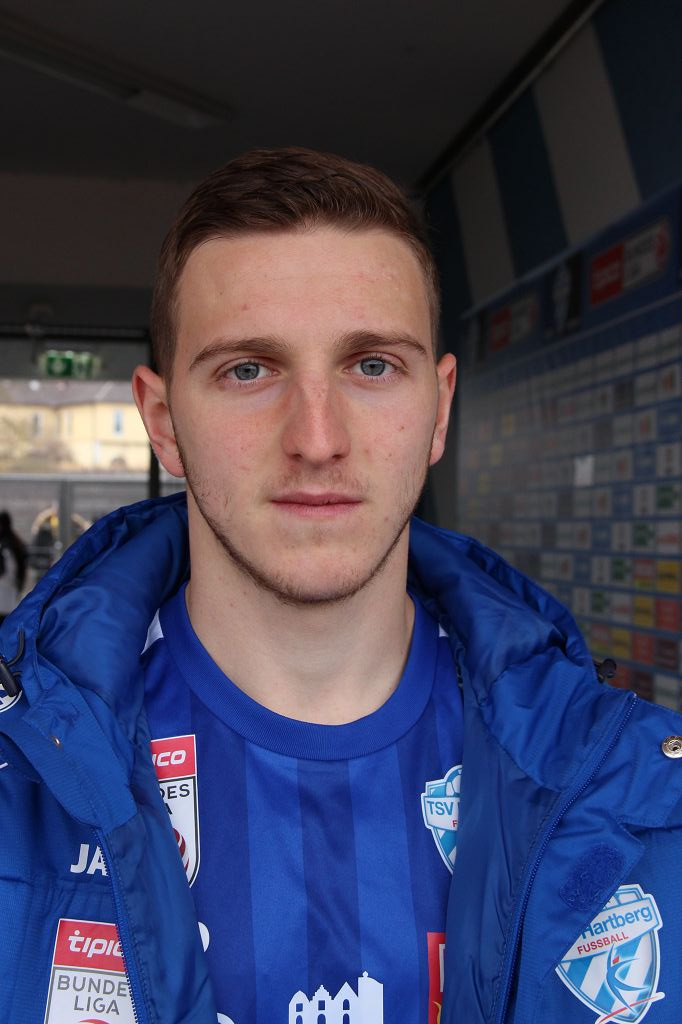

Personal information
- Date of birth: 28 March 1998 (age 28)
- Place of birth: Mannheim, Germany
- Height: 1.82 m (6 ft 0 in)
- Position: Forward

Team information
- Current team: Jeunesse Canach
- Number: 9

Youth career
- –2008: MFC 08 Lindenhof
- 2008–2017: 1899 Hoffenheim

Senior career*
| Years | Team | Apps | (Gls) |
| 2017–2021 | 1899 Hoffenheim II | 58 | (15) |
| 2017–2021 | 1899 Hoffenheim | 0 | (0) |
| 2019 | → TSV Hartberg (loan) | 5 | (0) |
| 2019–2020 | → Carl Zeiss Jena (loan) | 19 | (0) |
| 2021–2022 | 1. FC Schweinfurt 05 | 34 | (17) |
| 2022–2023 | 1860 Munich | 27 | (4) |
| 2023–2024 | Hallescher FC | 19 | (2) |
| 2024–2026 | Stuttgarter Kickers | 32 | (3) |
| 2026– | Jeunesse Canach | 0 | (0) |

International career
| 2013 | Germany U16 | 4 | (0) |
| 2015 | Germany U17 | 1 | (0) |
| 2017–2020 | Montenegro U21 | 12 | (3) |
- * Club domestic league appearances and goals as of 26 June 2026

Meris Skenderović (Serbian Cyrillic: Мерис Скендеровић, pronounced [skenděːroʋitɕ]; born 28 March 1998) is a footballer who plays as a forward for Luxembourgish club Jeunesse Canach. Born in Germany, and a former German youth international, he most recently represented Montenegro at youth level.

== Career ==
On 14 July 2023, 1860 Munich terminated Skenderović's contract by mutual consent.

On 16 July 2023, Skenderović signed with Hallescher FC.

== Career statistics ==
As of match played 30 April 2023

Appearances and goals by club, season and competition
| Club | Season | League | | | National Cup | | Continental | | Total | |
| Club | Season | Division | Apps | Goals | Apps | Goals | Apps | Goals | Apps | Goals |
|---|---|---|---|---|---|---|---|---|---|---|
| 1899 Hoffenheim II | 2016–17 | Regionalliga Südwest | 1 | 0 | — | | — | | 1 | 0 |
| 1899 Hoffenheim II | 2017–18 | Regionalliga Südwest | 15 | 2 | — | | — | | 15 | 2 |
| 1899 Hoffenheim II | 2018–19 | Regionalliga Südwest | 14 | 6 | — | | — | | 14 | 6 |
| 1899 Hoffenheim II | 2020–21 | Regionalliga Südwest | 28 | 7 | — | | — | | 28 | 7 |
| 1899 Hoffenheim II | Total | | 58 | 15 | — | | — | | 58 | 15 |
| 1899 Hoffenheim | 2017–18 | Bundesliga | 0 | 0 | 0 | 0 | 1 (Note: Appearances in the UEFA Europa League) | 0 | 1 | 0 |
| TSV Hartberg (loan) | 2018–19 | Bundesliga (Austria) | 5 | 0 | 1 | 0 | — | | 6 | 0 |
| Carl Zeiss Jena (loan) | 2019–20 | 3. Liga | 19 | 0 | — | | — | | 19 | 0 |
| 1. FC Schweinfurt 05 | 2021–22 | Regionalliga Bayern | 34 | 17 | — | | — | | 34 | 17 |
| 1860 Munich | 2022–23 | 3. Liga | 27 | 4 | 1 | 0 | — | | 28 | 4 |
| Hallescher FC | 2023–24 | 3. Liga | 0 | 0 | 0 | 0 | — | | 0 | 0 |
| Career Total | | | 143 | 36 | 2 | 0 | 1 | 0 | 146 | 36 |
