= Felix Götze =

German footballer

Personal information
- Date of birth: 11 February 1998 (age 28)
- Place of birth: Dortmund, Germany
- Height: 1.85 m (6 ft 1 in)
- Positions: Midfielder; centre-back

Team information
- Current team: SC Paderborn
- Number: 20

Youth career
- –2014: Borussia Dortmund
- 2014–2018: Bayern Munich

Senior career*
Years	Team	Apps	(Gls)
2017–2018	Bayern Munich II	19	(3)
2017–2018	Bayern Munich	0	(0)
2018–2023	FC Augsburg	6	(1)
2020	FC Augsburg II	4	(1)
2021	→ 1. FC Kaiserslautern (loan)	11	(1)
2021–2022	→ 1. FC Kaiserslautern (loan)	23	(2)
2022–2023	→ Rot-Weiss Essen (loan)	20	(2)
2023–2024	Rot-Weiss Essen	31	(1)
2024–	SC Paderborn	65	(4)

International career
2017	Germany U19	1	(0)
2018	Germany U20	2	(0)
- * Club domestic league appearances and goals as of 31 October 2026

Felix Götze (German pronunciation: [ˈfeːlɪks ˈɡœtsə]; born 11 February 1998) is a German professional footballer who plays as a midfielder or centre-back for Bundesliga club SC Paderborn.

== Club career ==
=== Youth career ===
Götze played for Borussia Dortmund until 2014, when he moved to the youth academy of Bayern Munich. Götze began in Bayern's under-17 team for the 2014–15 season, before moving up to the under-19 team for the 2015–16 season. In 2017, Götze won the 2016–17 A-Junioren Bundesliga Süd/Südwest with the under-19 team, scoring six times during the season. The team went on to advance to the final of the A-Junioren Bundesliga championship round, before losing to Borussia Dortmund 8–7 on penalties.

=== Bayern Munich ===
On 24 May 2017, Götze signed a professional contract with Bayern, with a two-year contract lasting until 2019.

Götze began his senior career with Bayern Munich II in the 2017–18 season, making his debut in the Regionalliga Bayern on 29 September 2017 in a 3–1 away loss against Wacker Burghausen. His first goal for the reserve team came on 3 November 2017, opening the scoring in the 26th minute in a 2–0 away win against FC Ingolstadt II.

=== FC Augsburg ===
On 1 July 2018, Götze moved on a free transfer to FC Augsburg, where he signed a four-year contract. He played his first match in the first round of the 2018–19 DFB-Pokal, a match ended with Augsburg winning 2–1 against TSV Steinbach Haiger. On 1 September 2018, he finally made his debut in the Bundesliga in a 1–1 draw against Borussia Mönchengladbach, in which he came on as a substitute in the 75th minute. On 25 September 2018, Götze scored the equaliser in the 87th minute in a match that finished 1–1 against his former club, Bayern Munich.

==== Loan to Kaiserslautern ====
On 1 February 2021, the last day of the 2020–21 winter transfer window, he moved to 3. Liga club 1. FC Kaiserslautern on loan for the rest of the season. He joined 1. FC Kaiserslautern on loan for a second time in July 2021.

=== Rot-Weiss Essen ===
On 29 August 2022, Götze was loaned to Rot-Weiss Essen by his request. On 24 May 2023, the transfer was made permanent.

=== SC Paderborn ===
On 21 May 2024, Götze signed with SC Paderborn in 2. Bundesliga.

== International career ==
=== Youth ===
On 25 June 2017, the Germany national under-19 team include Götze in their final squad for the 2017 edition of the UEFA European Under-19 Championship. Götze made his youth international debut on 9 July 2017, coming on as a substitute in the 81st minute for Jonas Busam in the 4–1 loss to England in the third round of the group stage. Germany were this eliminated from the tournament, finishing third in the group.

== Personal life ==
Felix was born in Dortmund, North Rhine-Westphalia, and is the younger brother of Mario Götze and Fabian Götze.

== Career statistics ==
As of 31 October 2026

Appearances and goals by club, season and competition
Club	Season	League			DFB-Pokal		Other		Total	
Club	Season	Division	Apps	Goals	Apps	Goals	Apps	Goals	Apps	Goals
Bayern Munich II	2017–18	Regionalliga Bayern	19	3	—		—		19	3
Bayern Munich	2017–18	Bundesliga	0	0	0	0	0	0	0	0
FC Augsburg	2018–19	Bundesliga	6	1	3	0	—		9	1
FC Augsburg II	2020–21	Regionalliga Bayern	3	1	—		—		3	1
FC Augsburg II	2022–23	Regionalliga Bayern	1	0	—		—		1	0
FC Augsburg II	Total		4	1	0	0	0	0	4	1
1. FC Kaiserslautern (loan)	2020–21	3. Liga	11	1	—		—		11	1
1. FC Kaiserslautern (loan)	2021–22	3. Liga	23	2	1	0	0	0	24	2
Rot-Weiss Essen (loan)	2022–23	3. Liga	20	2	—		3 (Note: Appearances in Lower Rhine Cup)	1	23	3
Rot-Weiss Essen	2023–24	3. Liga	31	1	1	0	2	0	34	1
SC Paderborn	2024–25	2. Bundesliga	31	3	2	0	—		33	3
SC Paderborn	2025–26	2. Bundesliga	30	1	2	0	2 (Note: Appearances in 2. Bundesliga promotion play-offs)	0	34	1
SC Paderborn	2026–27	Bundesliga	4	0	1	0	—		5	0
SC Paderborn	Total		65	4	5	0	2	0	72	4
Career total			179	14	10	0	7	1	196	15
