= Lucas Brumme =

German footballer

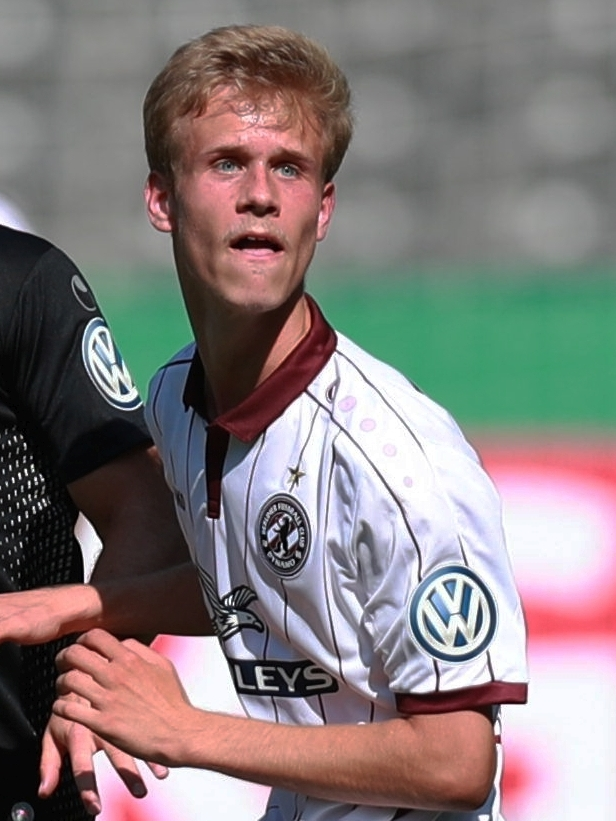
- Brumme with BFC Dynamo in 2018

Personal information
- Date of birth: 25 September 1999 (age 27)
- Place of birth: Germany
- Height: 1.87 m (6 ft 2 in)
- Position: Midfielder

Team information
- Current team: Rot-Weiss Essen
- Number: 14

Youth career
- –2016: Union Berlin
- 2016–2018: BFC Dynamo

Senior career*
Years	Team	Apps	(Gls)
2017–2019	BFC Dynamo II	8	(5)
2018–2021	BFC Dynamo	52	(10)
2021–2023	Wehen Wiesbaden	55	(5)
2023–	Rot-Weiss Essen	100	(9)
- * Club domestic league appearances and goals as of 20 May 2026

Lucas Brumme (born 25 September 1999) is a German professional footballer who plays as a midfielder for 3. Liga side Rot-Weiss Essen.

== Career ==
Brumme made his professional debut for Wehen Wiesbaden in the 3. Liga on 9 January 2021, starting in the home match against Hallescher FC. He was substituted out in the 68th minute for Benedict Hollerbach, with the match finishing as a 1–1 draw.

On 29 July 2023, Brumme joined Rot-Weiss Essen in 3. Liga on a one-year contract.
