= Minos Gouras =

German footballer

Personal information
- Date of birth: 7 June 1998 (age 28)
- Place of birth: Speyer, Germany
- Height: 1.76 m (5 ft 9 in)
- Position: Midfielder

Team information
- Current team: SGV Heilbronn-Freiberg
- Number: 19

Youth career
- –2013: Ludwigshafener SC
- 2013–2015: SC Freiburg
- 2015–2017: Astoria Walldorf

Senior career*
Years	Team	Apps	(Gls)
2017–2018	Astoria Walldorf II	67	(18)
2018–2020	Astoria Walldorf	35	(9)
2020–2022	1. FC Saarbrücken	57	(13)
2022–2023	Jahn Regensburg	17	(1)
2023–2025	Waldhof Mannheim	25	(1)
2025	FC 08 Homburg	31	(6)
2026–	SGV Heilbronn-Freiberg	20	(6)
- * Club domestic league appearances and goals as of 24 September 2026

Minos Gouras (born 7 June 1998) is a German professional footballer who plays as a midfielder for Regionalliga club SGV Heilbronn-Freiberg.

== Career ==
After playing youth football with Ludwigshafener SC, SC Freiburg and Astoria Walldorf and senior football with Astoria Walldorf II and Astoria Walldorf, Gouras joined 1. FC Saarbrücken on a two-year contract in July 2020.

On 23 June 2023, Gouras signed with Waldhof Mannheim.
