= Jeremias Lorch =

German footballer (born 1995)

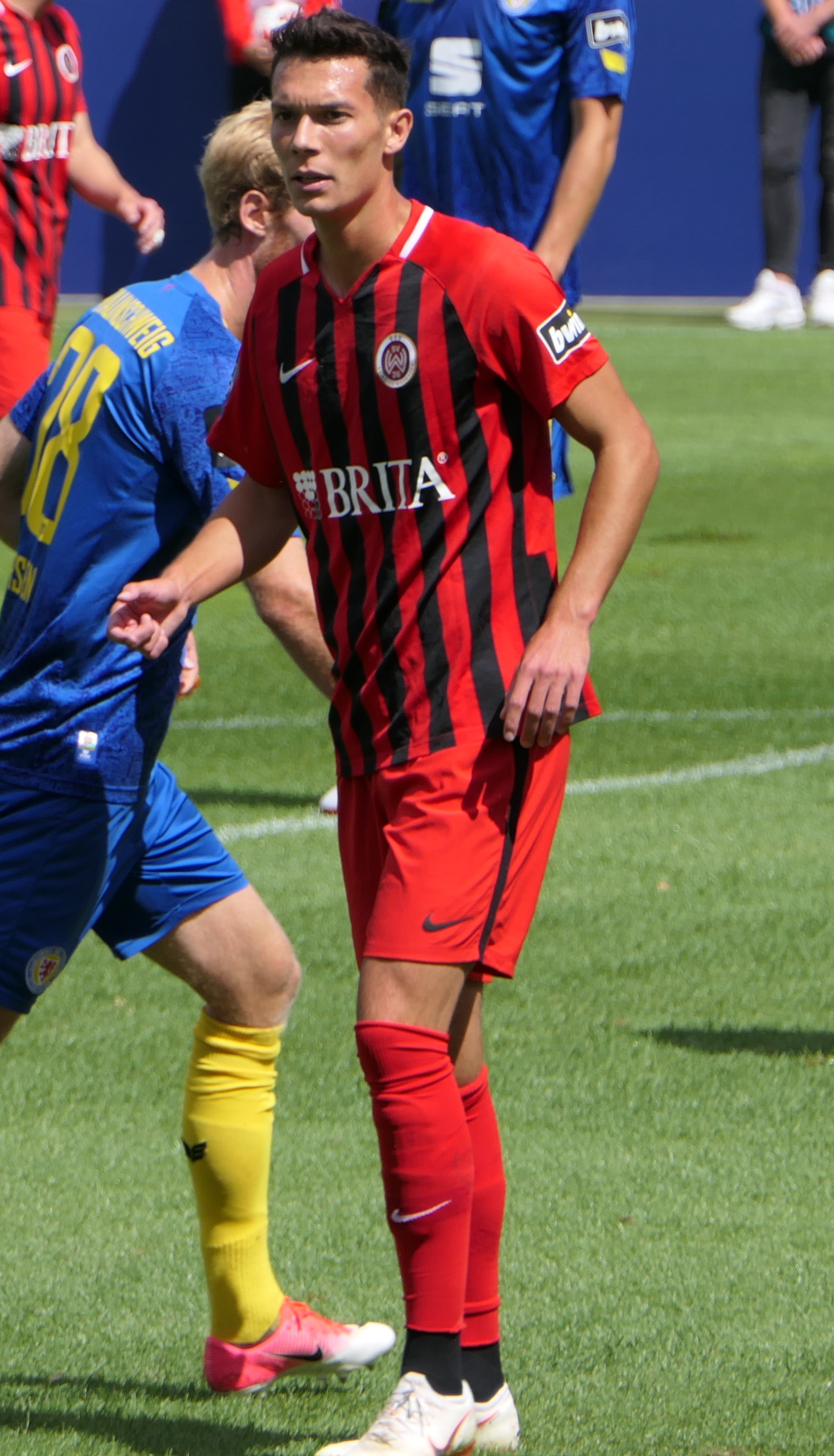
- Lorch with SV Wehen Wiesbaden in August 2018

Personal information
- Date of birth: 2 December 1995 (age 30)
- Place of birth: Heilbronn, Germany
- Height: 1.87 m (6 ft 2 in)
- Position: Defensive midfielder

Team information
- Current team: SGV Heilbronn-Freiberg
- Number: 24

Youth career
- SG Meimsheim
- –2011: VfB Stuttgart
- 2011–2013: SGV Freiberg

Senior career*
Years	Team	Apps	(Gls)
2013–2014	SGV Freiberg	41	(0)
2015–2017	Sonnenhof Großaspach	50	(1)
2017–2020	SV Wehen Wiesbaden	51	(4)
2020–2024	Viktoria Köln	94	(7)
2024–2025	SV Sandhausen	32	(5)
2025–2026	Alemannia Aachen	9	(0)
2026–	SGV Heilbronn-Freiberg	8	(0)
- * Club domestic league appearances and goals as of 24 September 2026

Jeremias Lorch (born 2 December 1995) is a German professional footballer who plays as a midfielder for Regionalliga Südwest club SGV Heilbronn-Freiberg.

== Club career ==
On 8 May 2024, Lorch signed with 3. Liga club SV Sandhausen.
