= Marius Köhl =

German association football player

Personal information
- Date of birth: 31 May 2001 (age 25)
- Place of birth: Ensdorf, Germany
- Height: 1.80 m (5 ft 11 in)
- Positions: Right winger; centre-forward

Team information
- Current team: SGV Heilbronn-Freiberg
- Number: 11

Youth career
- –2016: SV Elversberg
- 2016–2018: JFG Saarlouis
- 2018–2020: 1. FC Saarbrücken

Senior career*
Years	Team	Apps	(Gls)
2020–2022	1. FC Saarbrücken	8	(0)
2021	→ Rot-Weiß Koblenz (loan)	16	(1)
2022–2023	Rot-Weiß Koblenz	24	(5)
2023–2025	SG Barockstadt	56	(12)
2025–	SGV Heilbronn-Freiberg	24	(8)
- * Club domestic league appearances and goals as of 26 June 2026

Marius Köhl (born 31 May 2001) is a German professional footballer who plays as a right winger or centre-forward for SGV Heilbronn-Freiberg.

== Career ==
Born in Ensdorf, Kohl played youth football for SV Elversberg and JFG Saarlouis before joining 1. FC Saarbrücken in 2018. He made his senior debut as a late substitute for Nicklas Shipnoski in a 2–0 3. Liga win over Viktoria Köln on 13 November 2020. On 1 February 2021, he joined Rot-Weiß Koblenz on loan until the end of the season.
