= Kasim Rabihic =

German footballer (born 1993)

Kasim Rabihić
Personal information
- Date of birth: 24 February 1993 (age 33)
- Place of birth: Munich, Germany
- Height: 1.79 m (5 ft 10 in)
- Position: Winger

Youth career
- –2012: SpVgg Unterhaching

Senior career*
Years	Team	Apps	(Gls)
2012–2014	BC Aichach	51	(7)
2014–2015	1860 Munich II	32	(5)
2015–2017	Rot-Weiss Essen	49	(3)
2017–2019	FC Pipinsried	51	(23)
2019–2020	Türkgücü München	21	(11)
2020–2022	SC Verl	68	(12)
2022–2026	1. FC Saarbrücken	121	(22)
- * Club domestic league appearances and goals as of 30 May 2026

Kasim Rabihić (born 24 February 1993) is a German professional footballer who plays as a winger.

== Career ==
He left Verl at the end of his contract in summer 2022, and joined fellow 3. Liga club 1. FC Saarbrücken on a two-year deal.

== Career statistics ==
As of match played on 19 November 2023

Club statistics
Club	Season	League			National Cup		Continental		Other		Total	
Club	Season	Division	Apps	Goals	Apps	Goals	Apps	Goals	Apps	Goals	Apps	Goals
BC Aichach	2012–13	Bayernliga Süd	30	3	0	0	—		2 (Note: Appearances in the 2012–13 Bayernliga promotion play-offs)	0	32	3
BC Aichach	2013–14	Bayernliga Süd	21	4	0	0	—		—		21	4
BC Aichach	Total		51	7	0	0	0	0	2	0	53	7
TSV 1860 München II	2013–14	Regionalliga Bayern	8	1	—		—		—		8	1
TSV 1860 München II	2014–15	Regionalliga Bayern	24	4	—		—		—		24	4
TSV 1860 München II	Total		32	5	0	0	0	0	0	0	32	5
Rot-Weiss Essen	2015–16	Regionalliga West	27	1	1	0	—		6 (Note: Appearances in the Lower Rhine Cup)	0	34	1
Rot-Weiss Essen	2016–17	Regionalliga West	22	2	1	0	—		4	4	27	6
Rot-Weiss Essen	Total		49	3	2	0	0	0	10	4	61	7
FC Pipinsried	2017–18	Regionalliga Bayern	23	9	0	0	—		—		23	9
FC Pipinsried	2018–19	Regionalliga Bayern	28	14	0	0	—		2 (Note: Appearances in the Bavarian Cup)	0	30	14
FC Pipinsried	Total		51	23	0	0	0	0	2	0	53	23
Türkgücü München	2019–20	Regionalliga Bayern	21	11	0	0	—		1	0	22	11
SC Verl	2020–21	3. Liga	36	7	0	0	—		2 (Note: Appearances in the Westphalian Cup)	0	38	7
SC Verl	2021–22	3. Liga	32	5	0	0	—		2	0	34	5
SC Verl	Total		68	12	0	0	0	0	4	0	72	12
1. FC Saarbrücken	2022–23	3. Liga	28	7	0	0	—		4 (Note: Appearances in the Saarland Cup)	0	32	7
1. FC Saarbrücken	2023–24	3. Liga	14	3	2	0	—		—		16	3
1. FC Saarbrücken	Total		42	10	2	0	0	0	4	0	48	10
Career totals			314	71	4	0	0	0	23	4	341	75
