= Enes Küç =

German footballer

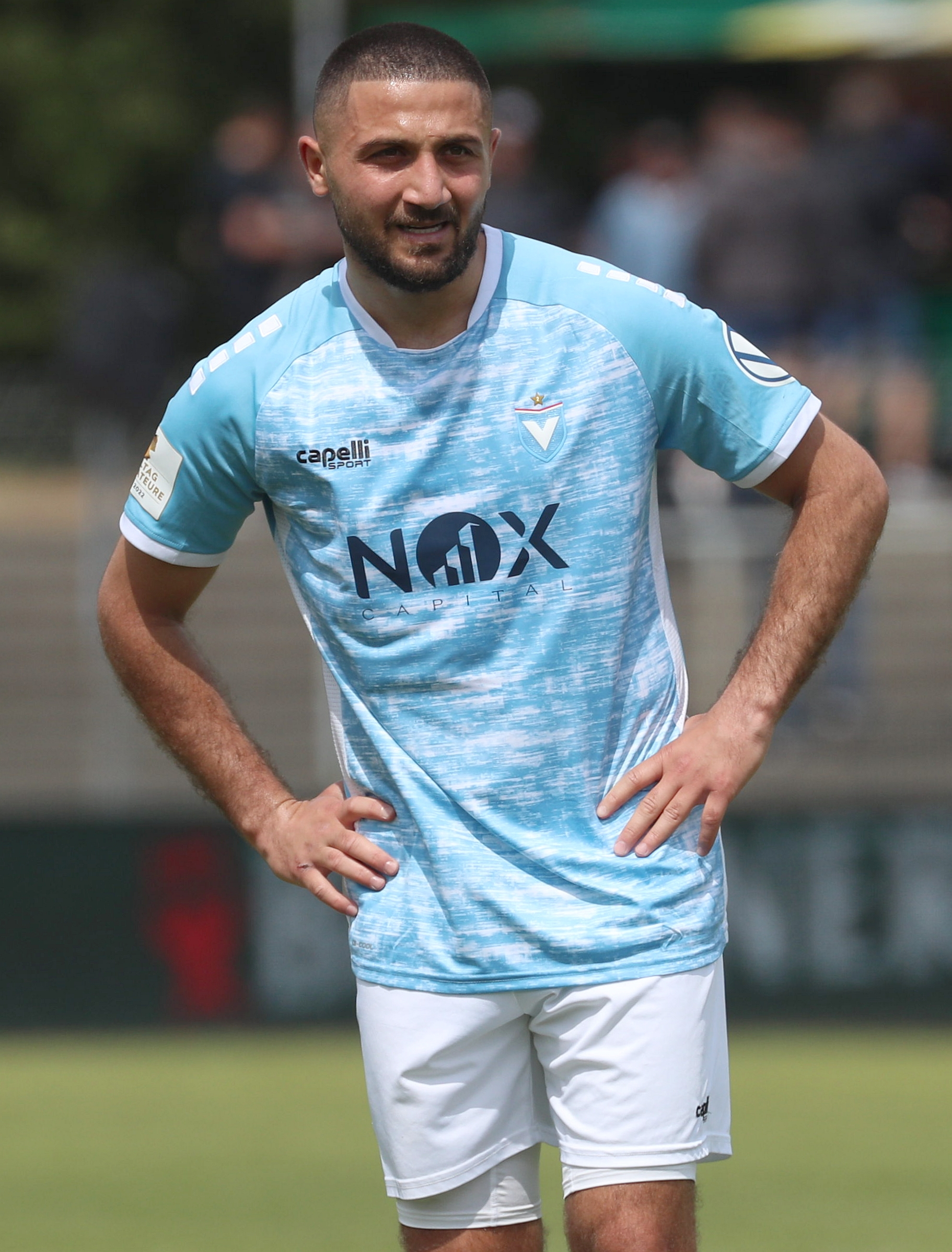

Personal information
- Date of birth: 28 November 1996 (age 29)
- Place of birth: Räckelwitz, Germany
- Height: 1.79 m (5 ft 10 in)
- Position: Midfielder

Team information
- Current team: Viktoria Berlin
- Number: 10

Youth career
- –2013: Tasmania Berlin
- 2013–2015: VfL Bochum

Senior career*
Years	Team	Apps	(Gls)
2014–2015	VfL Bochum II	3	(0)
2015–2017	Hamburger SV II	47	(5)
2017–2018	Berliner AK	33	(13)
2018–2019	Würzburger Kickers	17	(0)
2019–2020	Berliner AK	22	(8)
2020–2023	Viktoria Berlin	62	(13)
2023	Çorum	0	(0)
2023–2024	Alanya Kestelspor	23	(5)
2024	Würzburger Kickers	7	(1)
2025–	Viktoria Berlin	14	(4)
- * Club domestic league appearances and goals as of 2 May 2025

Enes Küç (born 28 November 1996) is a German footballer who plays as a midfielder for Regionalliga Nordost club Viktoria Berlin.
