= Vinko Šapina =

German footballer (born 1995)

Personal information
- Date of birth: 29 June 1995 (age 31)
- Place of birth: Ulm, Germany
- Height: 1.94 m (6 ft 4 in)
- Position: Midfielder

Team information
- Current team: FC Ingolstadt
- Number: 41

Youth career
- TV Wiblingen
- –2009: SSV Ulm
- 2009–2011: VfB Stuttgart
- 2011–2014: SSV Ulm

Senior career*
Years	Team	Apps	(Gls)
2014–2016	FC Memmingen	46	(4)
2016–2021	SSV Ulm	106	(12)
2021–2023	SC Verl	59	(4)
2023–2024	Rot-Weiss Essen	29	(3)
2024–2026	Dynamo Dresden	43	(2)
2026–	FC Ingolstadt	0	(0)
- * Club domestic league appearances and goals as of 18 May 2026

Vinko Šapina (born 29 June 1995) is a German professional footballer who plays as a midfielder for 3. Liga club FC Ingolstadt.

== Career ==
Born in Ulm, Šapina played youth football for TV Wiblingen, SSV Ulm 1846 and VfB Stuttgart before starting his senior career at FC Memmingen in 2014. After a trial with Hallescher FC in May 2016, he signed for SSV Ulm 1846 in summer 2016. After 12 goals in 106 appearances for Ulm, Šapina joined SC Verl on a two-year contract in summer 2021.

On 29 May 2023, Šapina agreed to join Rot-Weiss Essen in the 2023–24 season.

On 13 June 2024, Šapina signed with Dynamo Dresden.

On 23 June 2026, Šapina moved to 3. Liga club FC Ingolstadt.
