= Lucas Halangk =

German footballer (born 2003)

Personal information
- Date of birth: 22 September 2003 (age 23)
- Place of birth: Magdeburg, Germany
- Height: 1.76 m (5 ft 9 in)
- Position: Right-back

Team information
- Current team: Rot-Weiß Oberhausen
- Number: 22

Youth career
- –2019: 1. FC Magdeburg
- 2019–2021: Hallescher FC

Senior career*
Years	Team	Apps	(Gls)
2021–2025	Hallescher FC	66	(1)
2025–	Rot-Weiß Oberhausen	39	(3)
- * Club domestic league appearances and goals as of 23 September 2026

Lucas Halangk (born 22 September 2003) is a German professional footballer who most plays as a right-back for Regionalliga West club Rot-Weiß Oberhausen.

== Career ==
After progressing through 1. FC Magdeburg's youth academy, Halangk joined Hallescher FC in 2020. He made his professional debut for the club on 27 August 2021, coming on as a substitute for Aaron Herzog in the 88th minute of a 4–4 draw against SC Verl. The following day, he signed his first professional contract solidifying his commitment to the team.

On 20 April 2023, Halangk extended his stay with Hallescher FC, signing a contract extension with undisclosed terms.

On 30 May 2025, Halangk was announced to be leaving Hallescher FC after 6 years with the club.

Halangk joined Rot-Weiß Oberhausen as a free transfer on 10 June 2025.
