= Leonardo Vonić =

Croatian footballer (born 2006)

Personal information
- Date of birth: 10 July 2003 (age 23)
- Place of birth: Darmstadt, Germany
- Height: 1.85 m (6 ft 1 in)
- Position: Forward

Team information
- Current team: Moreirense (on loan from Porto B)
- Number: 79

Youth career
- TS Ober-Roden
- 2019–2020: FSV Frankfurt
- 2020–2022: 1. FC Nürnberg

Senior career*
Years	Team	Apps	(Gls)
2021–2023	1. FC Nürnberg II	41	(23)
2023–2025	Rot-Weiss Essen	52	(14)
2025–	Porto B	40	(14)
2026–	→ Moreirense (loan)	0	(0)

International career^{‡}
2022	Germany U19	1	(0)
2022	Croatia U20	2	(2)
- * Club domestic league appearances and goals as of 9 September 2026 ‡ National team caps and goals as of 15:23, 12 June 2025 (UTC)

Leonardo Vonić (born 10 July 2003) is a professional footballer who plays as a forward for Primeira Liga club Moreirense on loan from Porto B. Born in Germany, he represented both Germany and Croatia at youth level.

== Club career ==
Vonić is a product of the youth academies of TS Ober-Roden, FSV Frankfurt and 1. FC Nürnberg. In December 2021, he signed a professional contract with Nürnberg and was promoted to their reserves. On 25 July 2023, he transferred to the 3. Liga side Rot-Weiss Essen on a contract until 2026. On 31 January 2025, he transferred to FC Porto on a contract until 2028, and was assigned to their reserves. He made the senior FC Porto squad for the 2025 FIFA Club World Cup.

On 1 September 2026, Vonić was loaned by Moreirense in Primeira Liga.

== International career ==
Born in Germany, Vonić is of Croatian descent. In 2022, he played one match for the Germany U19s. That same year he also later played two matches with the Croatia U20s.
