= Ron Berlinski =

German footballer (born 1994)

Personal information
- Date of birth: 8 August 1994 (age 32)
- Place of birth: Bochum, Germany
- Height: 1.82 m (6 ft 0 in)
- Position: Forward

Team information
- Current team: Chemnitzer FC
- Number: 9

Senior career*
Years	Team	Apps	(Gls)
2012–2018	TuS Hordel		
2018–2021	RSV Meinerzhagen		
2021–2022	SC Verl	25	(10)
2022–2024	Rot-Weiss Essen	68	(9)
2024–2026	Kickers Offenbach	52	(22)
2026–	Chemnitzer FC	8	(2)
- * Club domestic league appearances and goals as of 26 June 2026

Ron Berlinski (born 8 August 1994) is a German professional footballer who plays as a forward for Chemnitzer FC.

== Career ==
Berlinski joined 3. Liga club SC Verl from fifth-tier side RSV Meinerzhagen in summer 2021. On 24 August 2021, he made his starting debut for SC Verl in the league, scoring a brace in a 4–4 draw against Hallescher FC.

On 17 June 2024, Berlinski signed with Kickers Offenbach in Regionalliga.
