= Sebastian Jacob =

German footballer

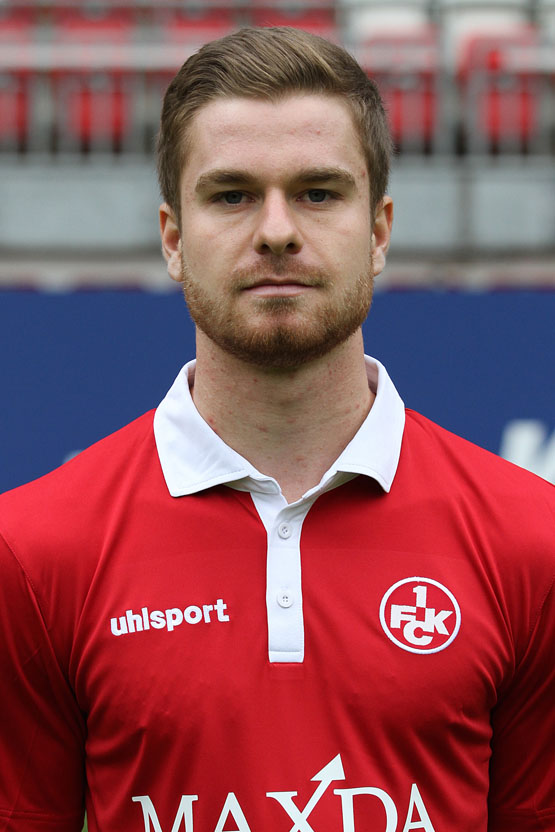
- Jacob in 2015

Personal information
- Date of birth: 26 June 1993 (age 33)
- Place of birth: Saarbrücken, Germany
- Height: 1.83 m (6 ft 0 in)
- Position: Forward

Youth career
- 2011–2012: 1. FC Saarbrücken

Senior career*
Years	Team	Apps	(Gls)
2012–2017	1. FC Kaiserslautern II	77	(22)
2014–2017	1. FC Kaiserslautern	24	(2)
2017–2024	1. FC Saarbrücken	119	(61)
- * Club domestic league appearances and goals as of 18 May 2024

Sebastian Jacob (born 26 June 1993) is a German professional footballer who plays as a forward.

== Career statistics ==
As of match played 1 July 2022

Appearances and goals by club, season and competition
Club	Season	League			DFB-Pokal		Other		Total	
Club	Season	Division	Apps	Goals	Apps	Goals	Apps	Goals	Apps	Goals
1. FC Kaiserslautern II	2012–13	Regionalliga Südwest	25	5	—		—		25	5
1. FC Kaiserslautern II	2013–14	Regionalliga Südwest	30	11	—		—		30	11
1. FC Kaiserslautern II	2014–15	Regionalliga Südwest	6	2	—		—		6	2
1. FC Kaiserslautern II	2015–16	Regionalliga Südwest	3	0	—		—		3	0
1. FC Kaiserslautern II	2016–17	Regionalliga Südwest	13	4	—		—		13	4
1. FC Kaiserslautern II	Total		77	22	0	0	0	0	77	22
1. FC Kaiserslautern	2014–15	2. Bundesliga	21	2	2	0	—		23	2
1. FC Kaiserslautern	2015–16	2. Bundesliga	0	0	0	0	—		0	0
1. FC Kaiserslautern	2016–17	2. Bundesliga	3	0	1	0	—		4	0
1. FC Kaiserslautern	Total		24	2	3	0	0	0	27	2
1. FC Saarbrücken	2017–18	Regionalliga Südwest	4	1	0	0	2 (Note: Appearances in play-offs for 3. Liga promotion)	1	6	2
1. FC Saarbrücken	2018–19	Regionalliga Südwest	23	17	—		—		23	17
1. FC Saarbrücken	2019–20	Regionalliga Südwest	19	17	3	0	—		22	17
1. FC Saarbrücken	2020–21	3. Liga	30	10	0	0	—		30	10
1. FC Saarbrücken	2021–22	3. Liga	32	9	0	0	—		32	9
1. FC Saarbrücken	Total		108	54	3	0	2	1	113	55
Career total			209	78	6	0	2	1	217	79
