= Ludwigsparkstadion =

Sports ground in Saarbrücken, Germany

Coordinates: 49°14′51″N 6°59′03″E

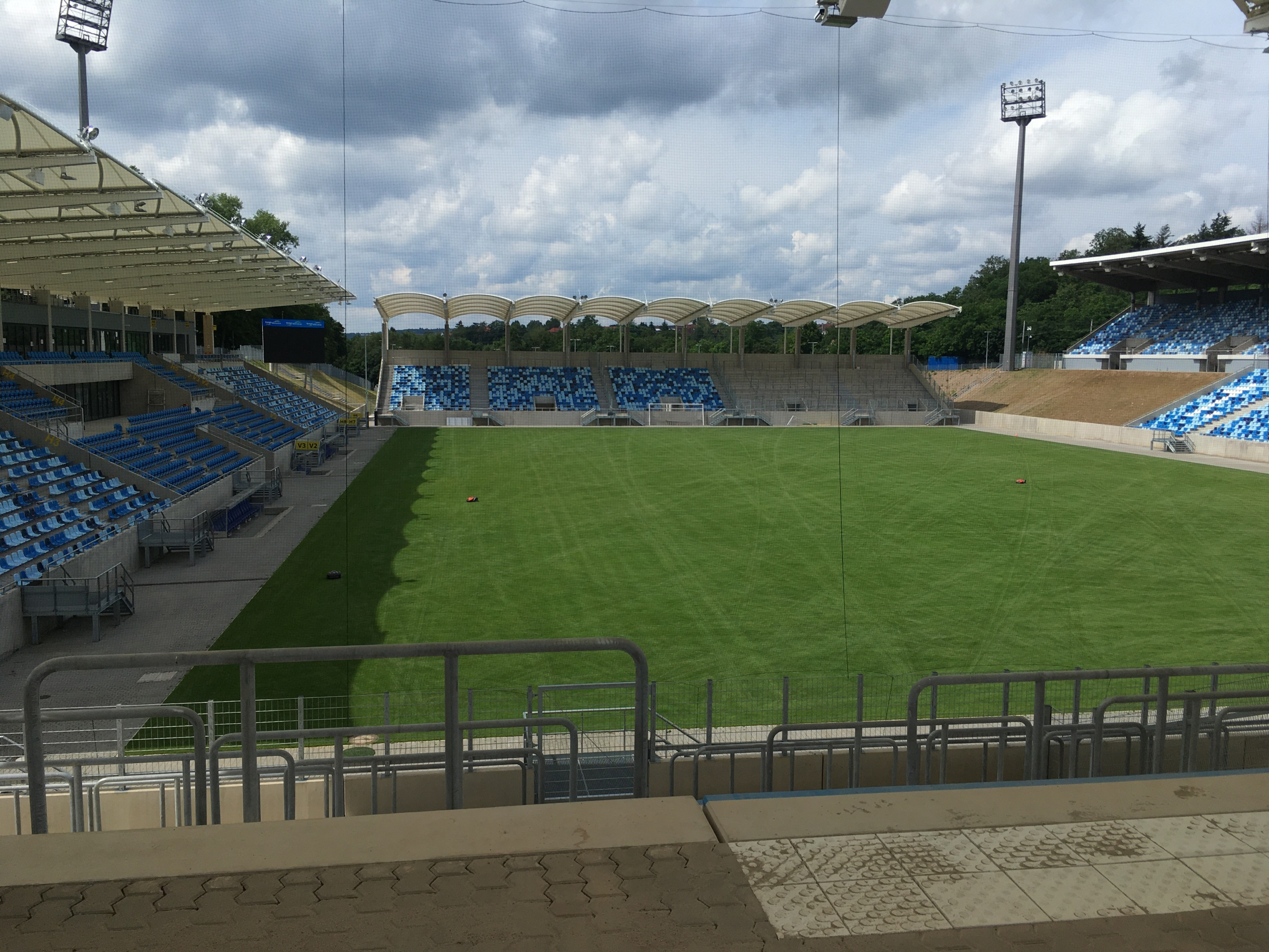
- View from the east tribune in July 2021
- Interactive map of Ludwigsparkstadion
- Location: Saarbrücken, Germany
- Capacity: 16,000

Construction
- Opened: 2 August 1953

Tenants
- 1. FC Saarbrücken; Saarland Hurricanes

Ludwigsparkstadion is a multi-purpose stadium in Saarbrücken, Germany. The stadium was built in 1953 and once held 35,303 people. After renovation, which lasted from 2016 to 2021 and cost €46.5M, the capacity has been reduced to around 16,000 seats.

It is currently used mostly for football matches and concerts. It is the home stadium of 1. FC Saarbrücken.

It served as the home ground for the Saarland national football team, which existed 1950–1956, during the era of the Saar Protectorate.

== Gallery ==
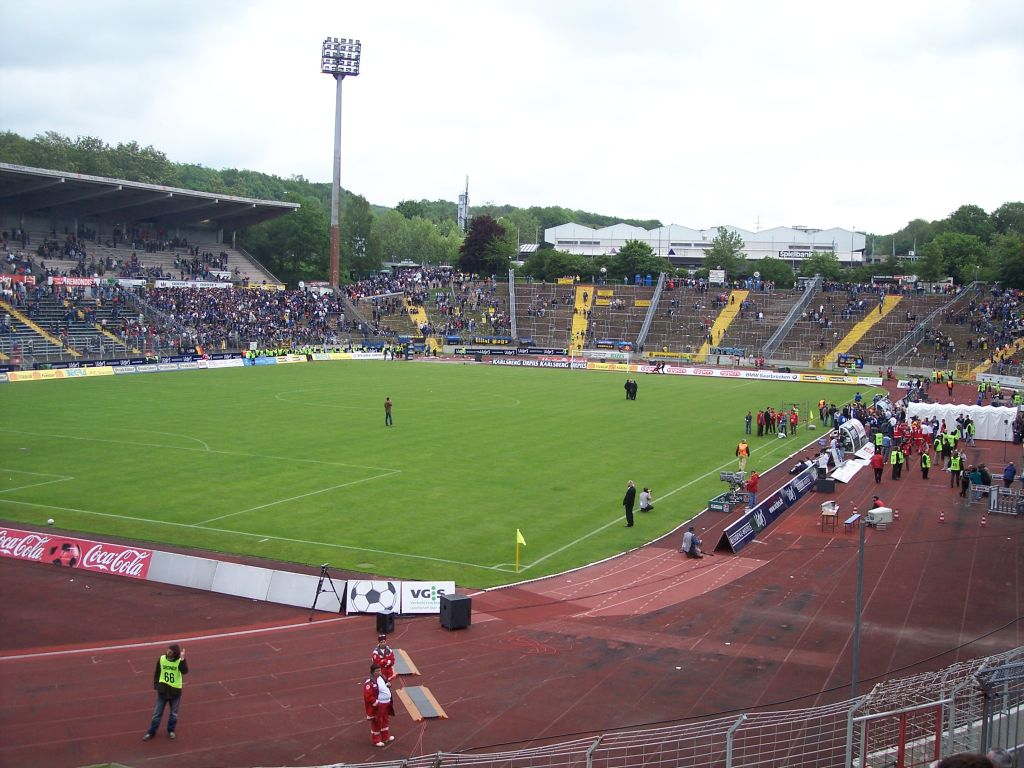
The stadium in 2005

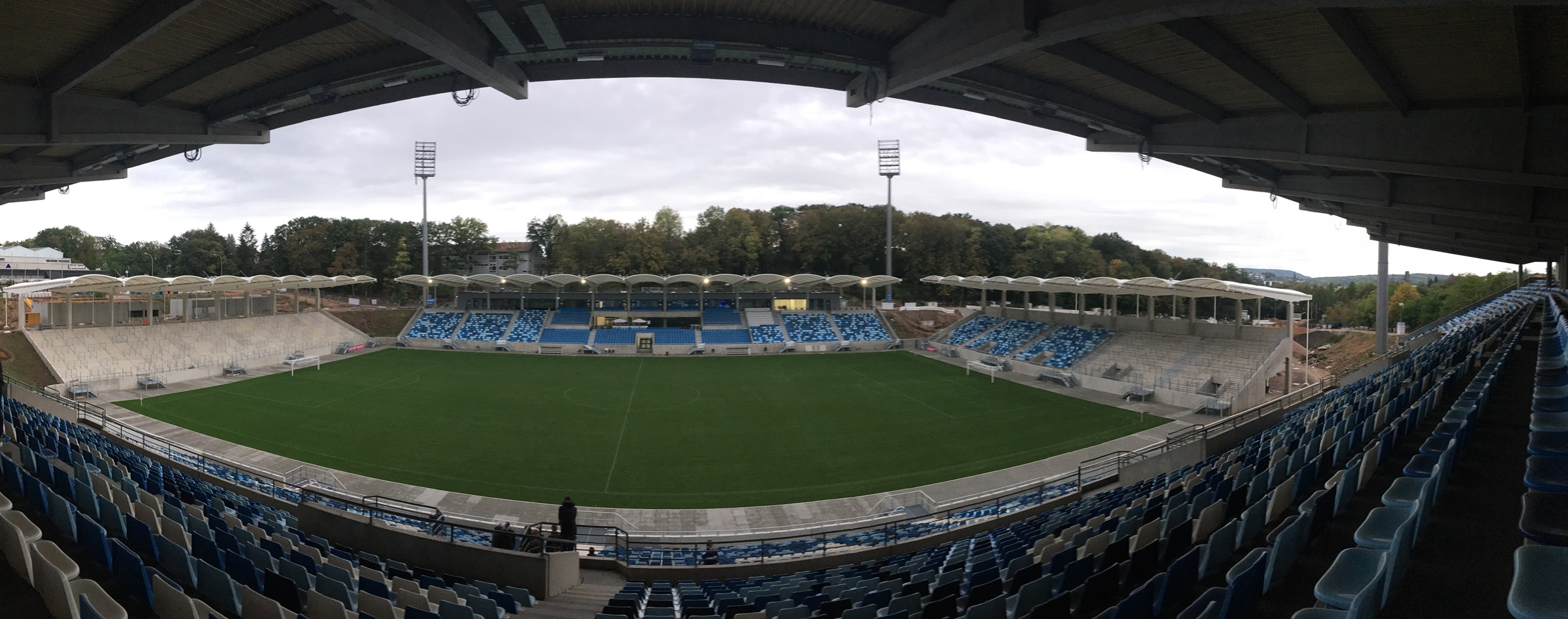
The "new" Ludwigspark during renovation in October 2020.
