= Leuna-Chemie-Stadion =

Stadium in Halle, Germany

Coordinates: 51°27′55″N 11°57′43″E

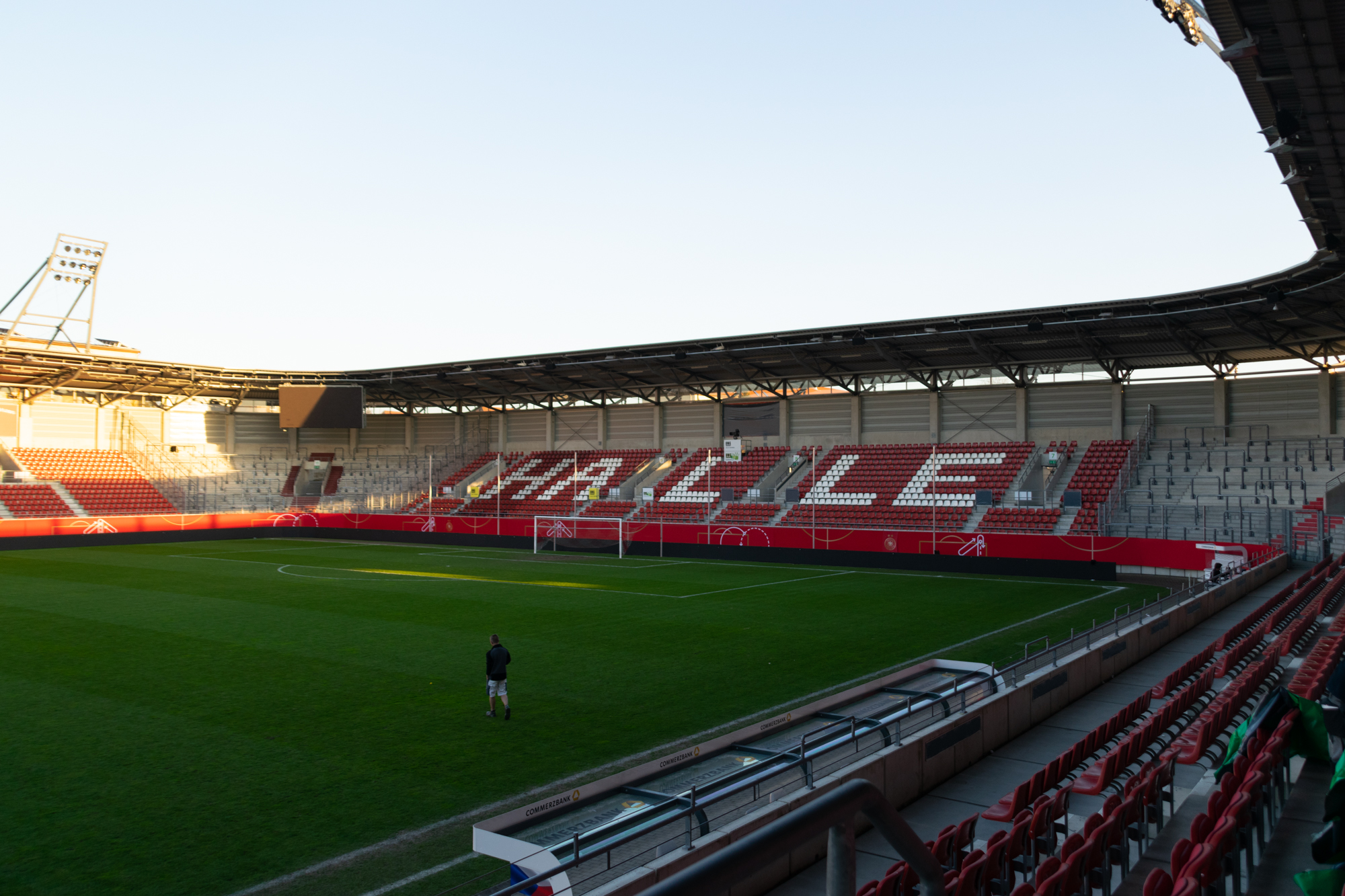
- Stadium south stand (2018)
- Interactive map of Leuna-Chemie-Stadion
- Former names: Erdgas Sportpark (2011–2021)
- Location: Halle, Germany
- Capacity: 15,057
- Surface: Grass

Construction
- Groundbreaking: 4 September 2010
- Opened: 17 September 2011

Tenant
- Hallescher FC (2011–present)

Leuna-Chemie-Stadion, known as Erdgas Sportpark until 2021, is a stadium in Halle, Germany. It has a capacity of 15,057 spectators. It is the home of Hallescher FC and replaced Kurt-Wabbel-Stadion.
