= 2024–25 FC Energie Cottbus season =

FC Energie Cottbus
2024–25 season
- Stadium: Stadion der Freundschaft
- 3. Liga: Pre-season
- DFB-Pokal: First round
- Brandenburg Cup: First round

The 2024–25 season is the 59th season in the history of FC Energie Cottbus, and the club's first season back in 3. Liga since 2018–19. In addition to the domestic league, the team is scheduled to participate in the DFB-Pokal and the Brandenburg Cup.

== Friendlies ==
=== Pre-season ===
28 June 2024 Friendly	1. FC Burg (Germany)	0–12	(Germany) Energie Cottbus	Berlin
18:00				Stadium: Friedrich-Ludwig-Jahn-Sportpark

6 July 2024 Friendly	Energie Cottbus (Germany)	2–0	(Germany) VSG Altglienicke	Finsterwalde
15:00	Thiele 8', 29'			Stadium: Stadion des Friedens

16 July 2024 Friendly	Energie Cottbus (Germany)	2–2	(Germany) Hertha BSC	Cottbus
18:30	Halbauer 48'; Thiele 90+1'		Tabaković 20'; Cuisance 28'	Stadium: Stadion der Freundschaft; Attendance: 5,774; Referee: Henry Müller

19 July 2024 Friendly	Energie Cottbus (Germany)	2–2	(Germany) FSV Zwickau	Peitz
16:30	Hajrulla 47'; Shcherbakovski 62'		Senkbeil 73'; Eixler 90'	Stadium: point S Reifenlehnigk Sportpark

21 July 2024 Friendly	Eintracht Braunschweig (Germany)	3–2	(Germany) Energie Cottbus	Braunschweig
13:00	Philippe 26', 45'; Marie 90'		Pronichev 14'; Shcherbakovski 69'	Stadium: B-Platz Eintracht-Stadion

== Competitions ==
=== Overall record ===
Competition	First match	Last match	Starting round	Final position	Record							
Competition	First match	Last match	Starting round	Final position	Pld	W	D	L	GF	GA	GD	Win %
3. Liga	4 August 2024	17 May 2025	Matchday 1		9	5	1	3	22	12	+10	55.56
DFB-Pokal	18 August 2024	18 August 2024	First Round	First Round	1	0	0	1	1	3	−2	0.00
Brandenburg Cup	6 September 2024				1	1	0	0	3	2	+1	100.00
Total					11	6	1	4	26	17	+9	54.55

Last updated: 6 October 2024
Source: Soccerway

=== 3. Liga ===
==== League table ====
Pos	Team	Pld	W	D	L	GF	GA	GD	Pts	Promotion, qualification or relegation
2	Dynamo Dresden (P)	38	20	10	8	71	40	+31	70	Promotion to 2. Bundesliga and qualification for DFB-Pokal
3	1. FC Saarbrücken	38	18	11	9	59	47	+12	65	Qualification for promotion play-offs and DFB-Pokal
4	Energie Cottbus	38	18	8	12	64	54	+10	62	Qualification for DFB-Pokal
5	Hansa Rostock	38	18	6	14	54	46	+8	60	
6	Viktoria Köln	38	18	5	15	59	48	+11	59	

Source: DFB
Rules for classification: 1) Points; 2) Goal difference; 3) Goals scored; 4) Head-to-head results; 5) Head-to-head away goals scored; 6) Away goals scored; 7) Play-off.
(P) Promoted

==== Results summary ====
Overall								Home						Away					
Pld	W	D	L	GF	GA	GD	Pts	W	D	L	GF	GA	GD	W	D	L	GF	GA	GD
22	12	6	4	45	25	+20	42	6	3	1	26	11	+15	6	3	3	19	14	+5

Last updated: 31 January 2025.
Source: soccerway

===== Results by round =====
Round	1	2	3	4	5	6	7	8	9	10	11	12	13	14	15	16	17	18	19	20	21	22	23	24	25
Ground	H	A	H	A	A	H	A	H	A	H	A	H	A	H	A	H	A	H	A	A	H	A	H	H	A
Result	L	L	W	L	W	W	W	W	D	D	W	W	L	D	W	W	W	W	D	W	D	D			
Position	13	17	15	16	11	8	5	4	4	4	3	1	1	5	1	1	1	1	1	1	1	1			

Updated to match(es) played on 31 January 2025. Source: worldfootball
A = Away; H = Home; W = Win; D = Draw; L = Loss

==== Matches ====
The match schedule was released on 9 July 2024.

4 August 2024 1	Energie Cottbus	1–2	Arminia Bielefeld	Cottbus
16:30	Pronichev (yellow card) 36'; Campulka (yellow card) 39'; Halbauer 42' (Ciğerci)	Report	Becker (yellow card) 7'; Corboz (yellow card) 24'; Kunze (yellow card) 35'; Russo (yellow card) 56'; Oppie 69' (Lannert); Mizuta (yellow card) 72'; Großer 90+2' (Oppie); Felix (yellow card) 90+4'; Lannert (yellow card) 90+6'	Stadium: LEAG Energie Stadion; Attendance: 12,596; Referee: Tom Bauer

9 August 2024 2	Dynamo Dresden	4–2	Energie Cottbus	Dresden
16:30	Kutschke 27' (pen.); Menzel 31' (Lemmer); Heise (yellow card) 66' (goal) 90+1' (Oehmichen); Meißner 78'; Oehmichen (yellow card) 88'	Report	Halbauer 7'; Ciğerci 11'; Pronichev (yellow card) 26'; Thiele (yellow card) 74'; Shcherbakovski (yellow card) 80'	Stadium: Rudolf-Harbig-Stadion; Attendance: 30,795; Referee: Felix Prigan

24 August 2024 3	Energie Cottbus	2–1	Alemannia Aachen	Cottbus
16:30	Rorig 19'; Borgmann 90+8'	Report	Heinz 52'	Stadium: LEAG Energie Stadion; Attendance: 9,218; Referee: Luca Jürgensen

1 September 2024 4	SV Wehen Wiesbaden	2–1	Energie Cottbus	Wiesbaden
13:30	Goppel 42'; Kaya 77'	Report	Ciğerci 64'	Stadium: Brita-Arena; Attendance: 4,615; Referee: Leonidas Exuzidis

15 September 2024 5	SC Verl	0–3	Energie Cottbus	Verl
16:30		Report	Krauß 19', 72'; Ciğerci 55'	Stadium: Sportclub Arena; Attendance: 2,618; Referee: Tobias Wittmann

21 September 2024 6	Energie Cottbus	4–0	VfB Stuttgart II	Cottbus
14:00	Ciğerci 29', 45+3'; Pronichev 51', 75'	Report		Stadium: LEAG Energie Stadion; Attendance: 9,077; Referee: Cristian Ballweg

24 September 2024 7	VfL Osnabrück	2–5	Energie Cottbus	Osnabrück
19:00	Simakala 23'; Engelhardt 67'	Report	Thiele 17', 81'; Copado 30'; Pronichev 71'; Halbauer 90'	Stadium: Stadion an der Bremer Brücke; Attendance: 14,439; Referee: Fabienne Michel

28 September 2024 8	Energie Cottbus	4–1	1. FC Saarbrücken	Cottbus
16:30	Thiele 17', 44', 80', 87'	Report	Civeja 45+1'	Stadium: LEAG Energie Stadion; Attendance: 9,077; Referee: Cristian Ballweg

6 October 2024 9	Hannover 96 II	0–0	Energie Cottbus	Hannover
13:30		Report		Stadium: Heinz von Heiden Arena; Attendance: 3,300; Referee: Leonidas Exuzidis

19 October 2024 10	Energie Cottbus	1–1	Sandhausen	Cottbus
14:00 CET	Pelivan (yellow card) 30'; Krauß 39' (yellow card) 43'	Report	Halimi (yellow card) 45+3'; Stolze (yellow card) 55'; Iwe 71'; Kreuzer (yellow card) 90+5'	Stadium: LEAG Energie Stadion; Attendance: 11,133; Referee: (Germany) Martin Speckner

22 October 2024 11	Erzgebirge Aue	1–3	Energie Cottbus	Aue
19:00 CET	Majetschak 44'	Report	Thiele 30' 90+4'; Ciğerci 81'; Rorig (yellow card) 90+8'	Stadium: Erzgebirgsstadion; Attendance: 10,319; Referee: (Germany) Daniel Schlager

27 October 2024 12	Energie Cottbus	5–1	1860 Munich	Cottbus
13:30 CET	Möker 3'; Copado 21' 30'; Pelivan (yellow card) 34'; Campulka (yellow card) 35'; Ciğerci 45+1'; Thiele 61'	Report	Schröter 26'; Lukas Reich (yellow card) 86'	Stadium: LEAG Energie Stadion; Attendance: 14,779; Referee: (Germany) Daniel Bartnitzki

2 November 2024 13	Rot-Weiss Essen	4–0	Energie Cottbus	Essen
14:00 CET	Ramien Safi 10' 72'; Leonardo Vonić 24'; Wintzheimer (yellow card) 85'; Eisfeld 89'	Report	Bretschneider (yellow card) 52'	Stadium: Stadion an der Hafenstraße; Attendance: 17,417; Referee: (Germany) Konrad Oldhafer

9 November 2024 14	Energie Cottbus	3–3	Borussia Dortmund II	Cottbus
14:00 CET	Thiele 17'; Ciğerci 31' (pen.); Slamar (yellow card) 55'; Sebald (yellow card) 80'; Jonas Hofmann (yellow card) 89' (goal) 90+3'; Romarjo Hajrulla (yellow card) 90+5'	Report	Hettwer 15' 80'; Foti (yellow card) 29'; Ostrzinski (yellow card) 31'; Rorig 32' (o.g.); Felix Paschke (yellow card) 45+3'; David Lelle (yellow card) 63'; Danylo Krevsun (yellow card) 86'; Babis Drakas (yellow card) 90+6'	Stadium: LEAG Energie Stadion; Attendance: 11,136; Referee: (Germany) Timon Schulz

22 November 2024 15	Viktoria Köln	0–1	Energie Cottbus	Köln
19:00 CET	Kevin Pytlik (yellow card) 51'; Greger (yellow card) 85'	Report	Pelivan (yellow card) 28' (yellow-red card) 74'; Pronichev 44'	Stadium: Sportpark Höhenberg; Attendance: 4,166; Referee: (Germany) Marc Philip Eckermann

30 November 2024 16	Energie Cottbus	2–0	Unterhaching	Cottbus
14:00 CET	Krauß 25'; Tim Hoops 49' (o.g.); Bretschneider (yellow card) 90'	Report		Stadium: LEAG Energie Stadion; Attendance: 9,177; Referee: (Germany) Nico Fuchs

7 December 2024 17	Waldhof Mannheim	0–1	Energie Cottbus	Mannheim
14:00 CET	Rieckmann (yellow card) 50'; Matriciani (yellow card) 82'	Report	Pelivan 10'; Romarjo Hajrulla (yellow card) 90+1'	Stadium: Carl-Benz-Stadion; Attendance: 11,438; Referee: (Germany) Assad Nouhoum

15 December 2024 18	Energie Cottbus	3–1	Hansa Rostock	Cottbus
13:30 CET	Campulka 45+1'; Krauß 65'; Copado 69'	Report	Haugen (yellow card) 45+2'; Rossipal (yellow card) 56'; Ryan Naderi 87'	Stadium: LEAG Energie Stadion; Attendance: 19,700; Referee: (Germany) Florian Exner

20 December 2024 19	Ingolstadt	1–1	Energie Cottbus	Ingolstadt
19:00 CET	Elias Decker (yellow card) 53'; Fröde (yellow card) 54'; Grønning (yellow card) 54' (goal) 59'	Report	Slamar (yellow card) 19'; Phil Halbauer 23' (yellow card) 58'	Stadium: Audi Sportpark; Attendance: 6,593; Referee: (Germany) Sören Storks

18 January 2025 20	Arminia Bielefeld	0–2	Energie Cottbus	Bielefeld
14:00 CET	Daniel Sumbu (yellow card) 30'	Report	Copado 2'; Phil Halbauer (yellow card) 43'; Krauß 47'; Rorig (yellow card) 78'	Stadium: SchücoArena; Attendance: 22,000; Referee: (Germany) Lukas Benen

25 January 2025 21	Energie Cottbus	1–1	Dynamo Dresden	Cottbus
14:00 CET	Pelivan (yellow card) 77'; Bretschneider (yellow card) 81'; Thiele 86'	Report	Kutschke 60'; David Kubatta (yellow card) 67'	Stadium: LEAG Energie Stadion; Attendance: 19,700; Referee: (Germany) Patrick Alt

31 January 2025 22	Alemannia Aachen	0–0	Energie Cottbus	Aachen
19:00 CET	Goden (yellow card) 23'; Castelle (yellow card) 75'	Report	Engelhardt (yellow card) 27'; Rorig (yellow card) 86'	Stadium: Tivoli; Attendance: 24,500; Referee: (Germany) Felix Bickel

8 February 2025 23	Energie Cottbus	–	Wehen Wiesbaden	Cottbus
14:00 CET				Stadium: LEAG Energie Stadion

=== DFB-Pokal ===
19 August 2024 First round	Energie Cottbus	1–3	Werder Bremen	Cottbus
18:00 CEST (UTC+2)	Pronichev (yellow card) 53'; Rorig 70'; Kusić (yellow card) 71'; Hajrulla (red card) 78'	Report	Topp 32' (Schmid) 37' 55' (Ducksch); Stark (yellow card) 46'; Njinmah (yellow card) 77'	Stadium: LEAG Energie Stadion; Attendance: 20,524; Referee: Harm Osmers

=== Brandenburg Cup ===
6 September 2024 2nd Round	Babelsberg	2–3	Energie Cottbus	Potsdam-Babelsberg
16:00	Pelivan 9' (o.g.); Bachmann 78'	Report	Halbauer 5'; Rorig 27'; Krauß 34'	Stadium: Karl-Liebknecht-Stadion; Attendance: 5,303; Referee: Tim Gerstenberg

16 November 2024 Round of 16	Oranienburger FC Eintracht	0–2	Energie Cottbus	Oranienburg
13:00		Report		Stadium: Orafol Arena

11 December 2024 Quarter Finals	SV Eintracht Alt Ruppin	0–3	Energie Cottbus	Neuruppin
19:00		Report		Stadium: Volksparkstadion

22 March 2025 Semi Finals	RSV Eintracht	0–0 (3-2 p)	Energie Cottbus	Stahnsdorf
14:00		Report		Stadium: Sportplatz Heinrich-Zille-Straße
