= 2026–27 FC Energie Cottbus season =

FC Energie Cottbus
2026–27 season
- Chairman: Sebastian Lemke
- Manager: Claus-Dieter Wollitz
- Stadium: Stadion der Freundschaft
- 2. Bundesliga: 3rd
- DFB-Pokal: Pre-season
- Top goalscorer: League: Tolcay Ciğerci (2); All: Tolcay Ciğerci (2)
- Biggest win: Energie Cottbus 3–1 Hannover 96

The 2026–27 season is the 61st season in the history of Fußballclub Energie Cottbus and the first following promotion in the 2. Bundesliga since 2014. They will also compete in the DFB-Pokal.

== Transfers ==
=== In ===
Pos.	Player	Transferred from	Fee	Date	Source
DF	(Germany) Gianluca Pelzer	(Germany) VfB Lübeck	Loan return	30 June 2026	
MF	(Germany) Leonardo Bittencourt	(Germany) Werder Bremen	Free	1 July 2026	
DF	(Mali) Fousseny Doumbia	(Germany) Eintracht Frankfurt II	Loan	1 July 2026	
MF	(Germany) Julian Guttau	(Germany) Erzgebirge Aue	Free	1 July 2026	
MF	(Germany) Christian Kinsombi	(Germany) Hansa Rostock	Free	1 July 2026	
GK	(Poland) Marcel Lotka	(Germany) Fortuna Düsseldorf	Free	1 July 2026	
DF	(United States) Ryan Malone	(Germany) Erzgebirge Aue	Free	1 July 2026	
DF	(Germany) King Manu	(Germany) Fortuna Düsseldorf	Free (Note: Loan made permanent)	1 July 2026	
FW	(Germany) Lucas Copado	(Germany) SC Paderborn	Undisclosed	2 July 2026	
GK	(Germany) Kevin Kratzsch	(Germany) Rot-Weiß Oberhausen	Undisclosed	20 July 2026	
DF	(Germany) Luca Erlein	(Germany) Bayer Leverkusen	Loan	27 July 2026	

=== Out ===
Pos.	Player	Transferred to	Fee	Date	Source
DF	(Bosnia and Herzegovina) Mladen Cvjetinović	(Germany) Holstein Kiel	Loan return	30 June 2026	
DF	(Germany) Nyamekye Awortwie-Grant	(Germany) SC Paderborn	Free	1 July 2026	
MF	(Democratic Republic of the Congo) Merveille Biankadi		Released	1 July 2026	
MF	(Germany) Finn Heidrich	(Germany) Erzgebirge Aue	Free	1 July 2026	
MF	(Syria) Can Yahya Moustfa	(Germany) 1. FC Nürnberg	Undisclosed	1 July 2026	
GK	(Germany) Marius Funk	(Germany) VfB Stuttgart	End of contract	1 July 2026	
DF	(The Gambia) Leon Guwara		Released	1 July 2026	
MF	(Germany) Janis Juckel	(Germany) Greifswalder FC	Free	1 July 2026	
DF	(Germany) Dennis Slamar	(Germany) Chemnitzer FC	Free	1 July 2026	
GK	(Germany) Alexander Sebald		Retired	1 July 2026	
DF	(Italy) Simon Straudi	(Germany) Dynamo Dresden	Free	1 July 2026	
FW	(Germany) Timmy Thiele		Released	1 July 2026	
MF	(Turkey) Tolga Ciğerci	(Germany) VSG Altglienicke	Free	6 July 2026	

== Pre-season and friendlies ==
26 June 2026 Friendly	SV Lok Calau (Germany)	0–17	(Germany) Energie Cottbus	Sportanlage Viersener Straße
18:00		Report		Attendance: 1,700; Referee: Andy Schmidt

27 June 2026 Friendly	LSV Bergen (Germany)	0–23	(Germany) Energie Cottbus	Norbert-Passeck-Sportfeld
17:00		Report		Attendance: 1,196; Referee: Max Stracke

28 June 2026 Friendly	Energie Cottbus (Germany)	4–0	(Germany) Stadtauswahl Cottbus	Lokstadion
10:00		Report		Attendance: 800; Referee: Henry Müller

3 July 2026 Friendly	Energie Cottbus (Germany)	1–1	(Germany) VSG Altglienicke
18:00	Wardak 83'		Nietfeld 76'

4 July 2026 Friendly	Energie Cottbus (Germany)	3–1	(Germany) Hertha BSC II
14:00	54'		45+1'

15 July 2026 Friendly	Energie Cottbus	2–4	(Czech Republic) Mladá Boleslav
17:00

25 July 2026 Friendly	Dynamo Dresden (Germany)	1–2	(Germany) Energie Cottbus
13:00

1 August 2026 Friendly	Energie Cottbus	2–4	Werder Bremen
15:00

== Competitions ==
=== Overall record ===
Competition	First match	Last match	Starting round	Record							
Competition	First match	Last match	Starting round	Pld	W	D	L	GF	GA	GD	Win %
2. Bundesliga	9 August 2026		Matchday 1	2	1	0	1	3	4	−1	50.00
DFB-Pokal	22 August 2026			0	0	0	0	0	0	+0	—
Total				2	1	0	1	3	4	−1	50.00

Last updated: 16 August 2026
Source: Competitions

=== 2. Bundesliga ===
Pos	Team	Pld	W	D	L	GF	GA	GD	Pts
5	VfL Wolfsburg	5	2	2	1	10	7	+3	8
6	1. FC Kaiserslautern	5	2	2	1	5	4	+1	8
7	Energie Cottbus	5	2	1	2	13	12	+1	7
8	VfL Bochum	5	2	1	2	4	4	0	7
9	FC St. Pauli	5	1	3	1	7	7	0	6

Updated to match(es) played on 13 September 2026. Source: Bundesliga
Rules for classification: 1) Points; 2) Goal difference; 3) Goals scored; 4) Head-to-head results; 5) Head-to-head away goals scored; 6) Away goals scored; 7) Play-off.
(Rules 4–6 only apply after home and away matches have been played between the tied teams.)

==== Results by round ====
Round	1	2	3	4	5
Ground	H	A	H	A	
Result	W	L	L	D	W
Position	3	8			

Updated to match(es) played on 29 August 2026. Source:
A = Away; H = Home; W = Win; D = Draw; L = Loss

==== Matches ====
9 August 2026 1	Energie Cottbus	3–1	VfL Wolfsburg	Cottbus
13:30	Ciğerci 14', 71'; Butler 76'	Report	Neubauer 28'; Tomiak (yellow card) 45+3'; Hugonet (yellow card) 86'	Stadium: Stadion der Freundschaft; Referee: Lars Erbst

16 August 2026 2	Arminia Bielefeld	3–0	Energie Cottbus	Bielefeld
13:30	Grodowski 26', 37', 76' (pen.); Boakye (yellow card) 78'; Handwerker (yellow card) 85'	Report	Rorig (yellow card) 27'; Butler (yellow card) 78'	Stadium: SchücoArena; Attendance: 25,304; Referee: Florian Lechner

29 August 2026 3	Energie Cottbus	3–4	Greuther Fürth	Bielefeld
13:30	Copado 6'; Boziaris (yellow card) 54'; Ciğerci 70'; Manu (yellow card) 77'; Bogdanov 90+4'	Report	Klaus 45+3' (pen.), 80'; Doumbia 46' (o.g.); Heuer (yellow card) 50'; Pohlmann 72'; Arifi (yellow card) 84'	Stadium: SchücoArena

5 September 2026 4	VfL Wolfsburg	4–4	Energie Cottbus	Wolfsburg
13:00	Glatzel 4' (pen.), 34'; Vinícius Souza 25'; Rexhbecaj (yellow card) 62'; Angély (yellow card) 70' (red card) 88'; Svanberg 79'	Report	Manu (yellow card) 6', (goal) 49'; Erlein 45+4'; Ciğerci 67' (pen.), (yellow card) 84'; Bogdanov 90+1', (yellow card) 90+2'; Hannemann (yellow card) 90+4'	Stadium: Volkswagen Arena; Attendance: 28,917; Referee: Lukas Benen

13 September 2026 5	Karlsruher SC	0–3	Energie Cottbus	Karlsruhe
13:30	Pedrosa (yellow card) 65'		Copado (yellow card) 7'; Bittencourt (yellow card) 18'; Michelbrink 45+2'; Pelivan 55'; Butler 62'	Stadium: BBBank Wildpark; Referee: Robert Hartmann

=== DFB-Pokal ===
22 August 2026 First round	Energie Cottbus	v	FC Augsburg	Cottbus
13:00				Stadium: Stadion der Freundschaft
