= 2023–24 VfL Osnabrück season =

VfL Osnabrück
2023–24 season
- Chairman: Holger Elixmann
- Manager: Uwe Koschinat (from 27 November)
- Stadium: Stadion an der Bremer Brücke
- 2. Bundesliga: 18th (relegated)
- DFB-Pokal: First round
- Top goalscorer: League: Erik Engelhardt (5); All: Erik Engelhardt (5)
- Average home league attendance: 14,586
- Biggest win: VfL Osnabrück 2–1 Hamburger SV
- Biggest defeat: Hannover 96 7–0 VfL Osnabrück

The 2023–24 season was VfL Osnabrück's 125th season in existence and first one back in the 2. Bundesliga. They also competed in the DFB-Pokal.

== Players ==
=== First-team squad ===
As of 1 September 2023

Note: Flags indicate national team as defined under FIFA eligibility rules; some limited exceptions apply. Players may hold more than one non-FIFA nationality.

| No. | Pos. | Nation | Player |
|---|---|---|---|
| 1 | GK | GER | Lennart Grill (on loan from Union Berlin) |
| 3 | DF | GER | Florian Kleinhansl |
| 4 | DF | GER | Maxwell Gyamfi |
| 5 | DF | KOS | Bashkim Ajdini |
| 6 | MF | GER | Maximilian Thalhammer |
| 7 | MF | GER | Noel Niemann |
| 8 | MF | GER | Robert Tesche |
| 9 | FW | GER | Erik Engelhardt |
| 10 | FW | GHA | Kwasi Okyere Wriedt (on loan from Holstein Kiel) |
| 11 | MF | GER | Charalambos Makridis |
| 13 | MF | GER | Lukas Kunze |
| 14 | DF | SEN | Oumar Diakhité |
| 15 | MF | COD | Paterson Chato |
| 16 | DF | GER | Henry Rorig |
| 17 | FW | GER | Christian Conteh |

| No. | Pos. | Nation | Player |
|---|---|---|---|
| 18 | FW | GER | Lars Kehl |
| 22 | GK | GER | Philipp Kühn |
| 23 | FW | NED | John Verhoek |
| 24 | DF | AUT | Manuel Haas |
| 25 | DF | GER | Niklas Wiemann |
| 26 | MF | GER | Dave Gnaase |
| 27 | MF | FRA | Michaël Cuisance (on loan from Venezia) |
| 28 | DF | GER | Florian Bähr |
| 29 | MF | GER | Oliver Wähling |
| 30 | MF | GER | Emeka Oduah |
| 32 | MF | GER | Jannes Wulff |
| 33 | DF | GER | Timo Beermann (captain) |
| 34 | GK | GER | Daniel Adamczyk |
| 36 | GK | GER | Luca Böggemann |
| 38 | FW | GER | Kevin Wiethaup |

=== Out on loan ===
Note: Flags indicate national team as defined under FIFA eligibility rules; some limited exceptions apply. Players may hold more than one non-FIFA nationality.

| No. | Pos. | Nation | Player |
|---|---|---|---|
| — | DF | TUR | Yiğit Karademir (at SV Meppen until 30 June 2024) |
| — | FW | GER | Leandro Putaro (at Arminia Bielefeld until 30 June 2024) |

| No. | Pos. | Nation | Player |
|---|---|---|---|
| — | FW | GER | Jannik Zahmel (at Blau-Weiß Lohne until 30 June 2024) |

== Transfers ==
=== In ===
| Pos. | Player | Transferred from | Fee | Date | Source |
|---|---|---|---|---|---|
| DF | (Kosovo) Bashkim Ajdini | (Germany) SV Sandhausen | Free | 1 July 2023 | |
| MF | (Germany) Maximilian Thalhammer | (Germany) Jahn Regensburg | Free | 1 July 2023 | |
| MF | (Germany) Christian Conteh | (Netherlands) Feyenoord | Free | 6 July 2023 | |

=== Out ===
| Pos. | Player | Transferred from | Fee | Date | Source |

== Pre-season and friendlies ==
Win Draw Loss

| 2 July 2023 Friendly | Sportfreunde Lotte (Germany) | 0–5 | (Germany) VfL Osnabrück |
| 14:00 |

| 8 July 2023 Friendly | VfL Osnabrück (Germany) | 0–0 | (Germany) Eintracht Braunschweig |
| 14:00 |

| 8 July 2023 Friendly | Fortuna Düsseldorf (Germany) | 1–1 | (Germany) VfL Osnabrück |
| 16:00 |

| 14 July 2023 Friendly | VfL Osnabrück (Germany) | 5–0 | (Netherlands) Emmen |
| 16:00 CEST (UTC+2) |
Note: Match was played in four periods of thirty minutes each.

| 21 July 2023 Friendly | VfL Osnabrück (Germany) | 1–0 | (England) Milton Keynes Dons |
| 16:00 |

| 22 July 2023 Friendly | VfL Osnabrück (Germany) | 1–0 | (Germany) Viktoria Köln |
| 13:00 |

| 13 October 2023 Friendly | FC Emmen (Netherlands) | 2–4 | (Germany) VfL Osnabrück |
| 13:00 |

== Competitions ==
| Competition | First match | Last match | Starting round | Final position | Record | | | | | | | |
| Competition | First match | Last match | Starting round | Final position | Pld | W | D | L | GF | GA | GD | Win % |
|---|---|---|---|---|---|---|---|---|---|---|---|---|
| 2. Bundesliga | 28 July 2023 | 19 May 2024 | Matchday 1 | 18th | 34 | 6 | 10 | 18 | 31 | 69 | −38 | 17.65 |
| DFB-Pokal | 14 August 2023 | | First round | First round | 1 | 0 | 0 | 1 | 1 | 3 | −2 | 0.00 |
| Total | | | | | 35 | 6 | 10 | 19 | 32 | 72 | −40 | 17.14 |

Source: Soccerway

=== 2. Bundesliga ===
==== League table ====
| Pos | Team | Pld | W | D | L | GF | GA | GD | Pts | Qualification or relegation |
|---|---|---|---|---|---|---|---|---|---|---|
| 14 | 1. FC Magdeburg | 34 | 9 | 11 | 14 | 46 | 54 | −8 | 38 | |
| 15 | Eintracht Braunschweig | 34 | 11 | 5 | 18 | 37 | 53 | −16 | 38 | |
| 16 | Wehen Wiesbaden (R) | 34 | 8 | 8 | 18 | 36 | 50 | −14 | 32 | Qualification for relegation play-offs |
| 17 | Hansa Rostock (R) | 34 | 9 | 4 | 21 | 30 | 57 | −27 | 31 | Relegation to 3. Liga |
| 18 | VfL Osnabrück (R) | 34 | 6 | 10 | 18 | 31 | 69 | −38 | 28 | Relegation to 3. Liga |

Source: DFB
Rules for classification: 1) Points; 2) Goal difference; 3) Goals scored; 4) Head-to-head results; 5) Head-to-head away goals scored; 6) Away goals scored; 7) Play-off.
(Rules 4–6 only apply after home and away matches have been played between the tied teams.)
(R) Relegated

==== Matches ====
The league fixtures were unveiled on 30 June 2023.

2. Bundesliga match details
| Round | Date | Time | Opponent | Venue | Result F–A | Scorers | Attendance | League position | Ref. |
|---|---|---|---|---|---|---|---|---|---|
| 1 | 29 July 2023 | 13:00 | Karlsruher SC | Home | 2–3 | Engelhardt 13', Tesche 71' | 15,741 | 12th | |
| 2 | 4 August 2023 | 18:30 | SC Paderborn 07 | Away | 1–1 | Kleinhansl 80' | 14,789 | 12th | |
| 3 | 20 August 2023 | 13:30 | 1. FC Nuremberg | Home | 2–3 | Conteh 86', 88' | 15,741 | 16th | |
| 4 | 26 August 2023 | 13:00 | Hansa Rostock | Away | 1–2 | Gnaase 45+3' | 25,500 | 17th | |
| 5 | 3 September 2023 | 13:30 | SV 07 Elversberg | Home | 0–1 | | 14,478 | 18th | |
| 6 | 17 September 2023 | 13:30 | Hannover 96 | Away | 0–7 | | 37,000 | 18th | |
| 7 | 22 September 2023 | 18:30 | Hamburger SV | Home | 2–1 | | | | |
| 8 | 1 October 2023 | 13:30 | 1. FC Kaiserslautern | Home | 2–2 | | | | |
| 9 | 6 October 2023 | 18:30 | Fortuna Düsseldorf | Away | 1–1 | | | | |
| 10 | 21 October 2023 | 13:00 | SV Wehen Wiesbaden | Home | 0–2 | | | | |
| 11 | 27 October 2023 | 18:30 | SpVgg Greuther Fürth | Away | 0–4 | | | | |
| 12 | 4 November 2023 | 13:00 | Holstein Kiel | Home | 1–1 | | | | |
| 13 | 11 November 2023 | 13:00 | Eintracht Braunschweig | Away | 2–3 | | | | |
| 14 | 25 November 2023 | 13:00 | 1. FC Magdeburg | Home | 0–2 | | | | |
| 15 | 1 December 2023 | 18:30 | FC Schalke 04 | Away | 0–4 | | | | |
| 16 | 9 December 2023 | 20:30 | FC St. Pauli | Home | 1–1 | | | | |
| 17 | 16 December 2023 | 13:00 | Hertha BSC | Away | 0–0 | | | | |
| 18 | 19 January 2024 | 18:30 | Karlsruher SC | Away | 1–2 | | | | |
| 19 | 27 January 2024 | 13:00 | SC Paderborn 07 | Home | 0–0 | | | | |
| 20 | 3 February 2024 | 13:00 | 1. FC Nuremberg | Away | 2–2 | | | | |
| 21 | 11 February 2024 | 13:30 | Hansa Rostock | Home | 0–0 | | | | |
| 22 | 18 February 2024 | 13:30 | SV 07 Elversberg | Away | 1–3 | | | | |
| 23 | 24 February 2024 | 13:00 | Hannover 96 | Home | 1–0 | | | | |
| 24 | 3 March 2024 | 13:30 | Hamburger SV | Away | 2–1 | | | | |
| 25 | 10 March 2024 | 13:30 | 1. FC Kaiserslautern | Away | 2–3 | | | | |
| 26 | 15 March 2024 | 18:30 | Fortuna Düsseldorf | Home | 0–4 | | | | |
| 27 | 31 March 2024 | 13:30 | SV Wehen Wiesbaden | Away | 1–0 | | | | |
| 28 | 7 April 2024 | 13:30 | SpVgg Greuther Fürth | Home | 2–0 | | | | |
| 29 | 13 April 2024 | 13:00 | Holstein Kiel | Away | 0–4 | | | | |
| 30 | 20 April 2024 | 13:00 | Eintracht Braunschweig | Home | 0–3 | | | | |
| 31 | 28 April 2024 | 13:30 | 1. FC Magdeburg | Away | 1–1 | | | | |
| 32 | 7 May 2024 | 18:30 | Schalke 04 | Home | 0–4 | | | | |
| 33 | 12 May 2024 | 13:30 | FC St. Pauli | Away | 1–3 | Kehl 90+1' | 29,546 | 18th | |
| 34 | 19 May 2024 | 15:30 | Hertha BSC | Home | 2–1 | Wiemann 44', Makridis 76' | 15,741 | 18th | |

=== DFB-Pokal ===
DFB-Pokal match details
| Round | Date | Time | Opponent | Venue | Result F–A | Scorers | Attendance | Ref. |
|---|---|---|---|---|---|---|---|---|
| First round | 14 August 2023 | 20:45 | 1. FC Köln | Home | 1–3 (a.e.t.) | Makridis 73' | 15,741 | |
