= Ciğerci =

Ciğerci is a Turkish surname. Notable people with the surname include:

- Tolcay Ciğerci (born 1995), German-born Turkish footballer, brother of Tolga
- Tolga Ciğerci (born 1992), Turkish footballer
