= Maximilian Pronichev =

Russian footballer (born 1997)

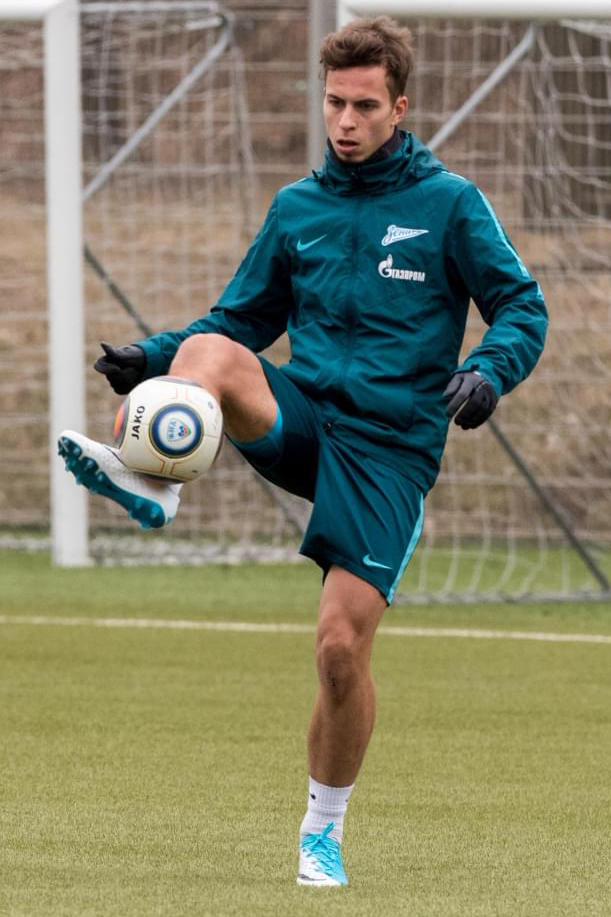
- Pronichev with Zenit in 2017

Personal information
- Full name: Maximilian Mikhailovich Pronichev
- Date of birth: 17 November 1997 (age 28)
- Place of birth: Berlin, Germany
- Height: 1.83 m (6 ft 0 in)
- Position: Forward

Team information
- Current team: TSV Steinbach Haiger
- Number: 9

Youth career
- 2009–2010: Tennis Borussia Berlin
- 2010–2011: Lichterfelder FC
- 2011–2014: Hertha BSC
- 2014–2015: Zenit Saint Petersburg
- 2015–2016: → Schalke 04 (loan)

Senior career*
Years	Team	Apps	(Gls)
2016–2017	Zenit-2 Saint Petersburg	27	(3)
2017–2020	Hertha BSC II	32	(22)
2018–2020	Hertha BSC	0	(0)
2018–2019	→ Erzgebirge Aue (loan)	0	(0)
2019	→ Hallescher FC (loan)	9	(0)
2020–2021	Rot-Weiss Essen	15	(5)
2021–2022	Energie Cottbus	36	(15)
2022–2023	SV Horn	23	(4)
2023–2024	Rot-Weiß Erfurt	14	(1)
2024–2025	Energie Cottbus	38	(10)
2025–	TSV Steinbach Haiger	14	(3)

International career
2012	Russia U15	2	(1)
2012–2013	Russia U16	11	(8)
2013–2014	Russia U17	13	(2)
2014–2015	Russia U18	11	(2)
2015–2016	Russia U19	6	(2)
2016	Russia U21	2	(0)
- * Club domestic league appearances and goals as of 26 June 2026

Maximilian Mikhailovich Pronichev (Russian: Максимилиан Михайлович Проничев; born 17 November 1997) is a German-Russian professional footballer who plays as a forward for TSV Steinbach Haiger.

== Club career ==
He made his debut in the Russian Football National League for FC Zenit-2 Saint Petersburg on 11 July 2016 in a game against FC Sokol Saratov.

On 24 June 2021, he signed with Energie Cottbus.

On 1 July 2022, Pronichev signed a two-year deal with SV Horn in Austria.

On 22 July 2025, Pronichev moved to TSV Steinbach Haiger in the fourth-tier Regionalliga Südwest.

== Personal life ==
His father Mikhail Pronichev played in the Soviet Top League for FC Lokomotiv Moscow, and later in Germany for FC Berlin where Maximilian was born.
