= Maximilian Krauß =

German footballer

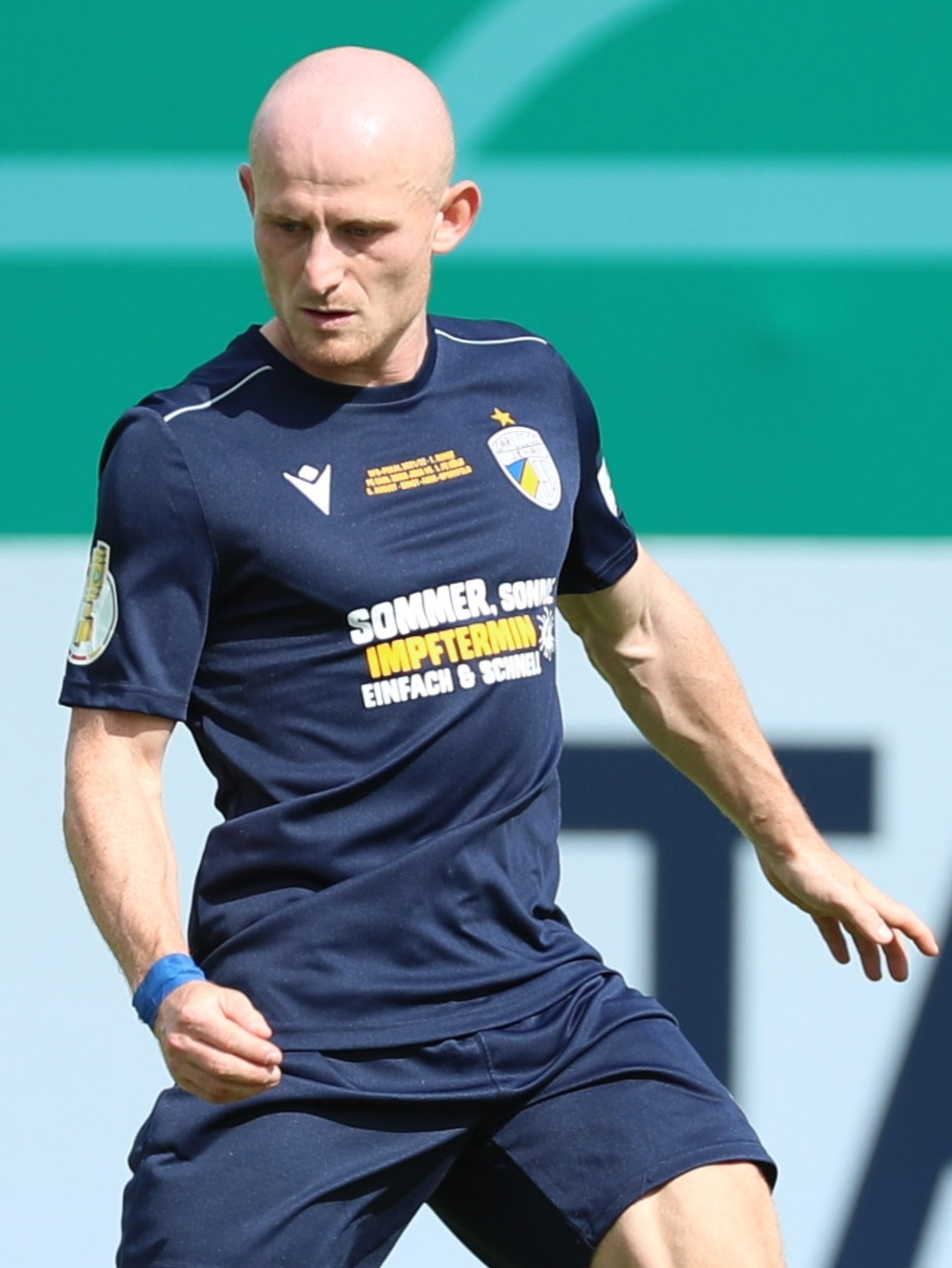
- Maximilian Krauß (2021)

Personal information
- Date of birth: 24 November 1996 (age 29)
- Place of birth: Münchberg, Germany
- Height: 1.70 m (5 ft 7 in)
- Position: Winger

Team information
- Current team: Hansa Rostock
- Number: 35

Youth career
- –2011: FC Eintracht Münchberg
- 2011–2015: Bayern Hof

Senior career*
Years	Team	Apps	(Gls)
2014–2016	Bayern Hof	50	(6)
2016–2018	1. FC Nürnberg II	52	(11)
2018–2021	SpVgg Unterhaching	27	(1)
2021–2023	Carl Zeiss Jena	70	(13)
2024–2025	Energie Cottbus	50	(15)
2025–	Hansa Rostock	33	(4)
- * Club domestic league appearances and goals as of 28 May 2026

Maximilian Krauß (born 24 November 1996) is a German footballer who plays as a winger for 3. Liga club Hansa Rostock.

== Career ==
Krauß started his career at Eintracht Münchberg, before moving to Bayern Hof in 2011.

On 2 June 2025, Krauß signed with Hansa Rostock.
