= Yannik Möker =

German footballer

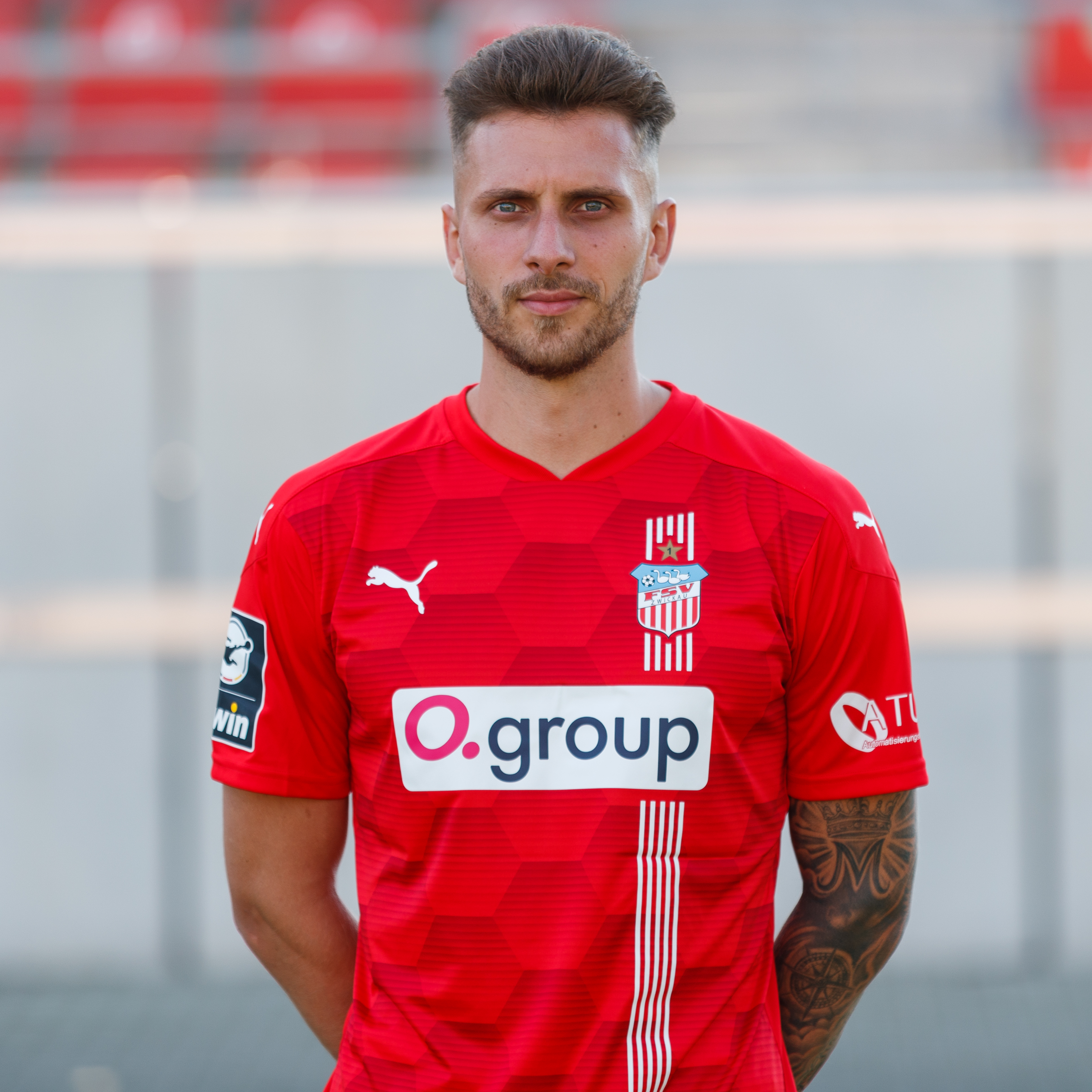
- Möker with FSV Zwickau in July 2021

Personal information
- Date of birth: 27 July 1999 (age 27)
- Place of birth: Wolfenbüttel, Germany
- Height: 1.80 m (5 ft 11 in)
- Position: Midfielder

Team information
- Current team: Rot-Weiß Oberhausen
- Number: 6

Youth career
- –2009: TSV Gielde
- 2009–2011: Eintracht Braunschweig
- 2011–2018: VfL Wolfsburg

Senior career*
Years	Team	Apps	(Gls)
2018–2020	VfL Wolfsburg II	51	(7)
2020–2023	FSV Zwickau	63	(3)
2024–2025	Energie Cottbus	28	(1)
2026	FSV Schöningen	8	(0)
2026–	Rot-Weiß Oberhausen	5	(0)

International career^{‡}
2017	Germany U18	1	(0)
- * Club domestic league appearances and goals as of 23 September 2026 ‡ National team caps and goals as of 21:33, 20 March 2021 (UTC)

Yannik Möker (born 27 July 1999) is a German footballer who plays as a midfielder for Regionalliga West club Rot-Weiß Oberhausen.

== Early life ==
Möker was born in Wolfenbüttel.

== Club career ==
After playing youth football with TSV Gielde, Eintracht Braunschweig and VfL Wolfsburg, and senior football with VfL Wolfsburg II where he made 51 appearances and scored 9 goals, he signed for FSV Zwickau on a one-year contract in August 2020. He made his debut for FSV Zwickau on 17 October 2020 in a 2–1 3. Liga defeat to KFC Uerdingen 05.

== International career ==
He was capped once by Germany at under-18 level.
