= Henry Rorig =

German footballer

Personal information
- Date of birth: 3 March 2000 (age 26)
- Place of birth: Langenhagen, Germany
- Height: 1.81 m (5 ft 11 in)
- Position: Right-back

Team information
- Current team: Energie Cottbus
- Number: 3

Youth career
- –2015: VfL Wolfsburg
- 2015–2019: Werder Bremen

Senior career*
Years	Team	Apps	(Gls)
2019–2020	Werder Bremen II	21	(0)
2020–2022	1. FC Magdeburg	24	(1)
2022–2024	VfL Osnabrück	35	(2)
2024–	Energie Cottbus	72	(5)
- * Club domestic league appearances and goals as of 21:54, 2 November 2026 (UTC)

Henry Rorig (born 3 March 2000) is a German professional footballer who plays as a right-back for 2. Bundesliga club Energie Cottbus.

== Career ==
Rorig was born in Langenhagen on 3 March 2000. He joined Werder Bremen's youth team from VfL Wolfsburg's in 2015.

He joined 3. Liga side 1. FC Magdeburg from Werder Bremen II in summer 2020.

In June 2022, Rorig signed with VfL Osnabrück.

On 17 June 2024, Rorig moved to Energie Cottbus, recently promoted to 3. Liga. He was part of the Energie Cottbus team that won promotion to the 2. Bundesliga in the 2025–26 season, and in summer 2026, he extended his contract with the club to summer 2027.

== Career statistics ==
As of match played 30 October 2026

Appearances and goals by club, season and competition
Club	Season	League			DFB-Pokal		Other		Total	
Club	Season	Division	Apps	Goals	Apps	Goals	Apps	Goals	Apps	Goals
Werder Bremen II	2019–20	Regionalliga Nord	21	0	—		—		21	0
1. FC Magdeburg	2020–21	3. Liga	15	0	0	0	—		15	0
1. FC Magdeburg	2021–22	3. Liga	9	1	0	0	—		9	1
1. FC Magdeburg	Total		24	1	0	0	0	0	24	1
VfL Osnabrück	2022–23	3. Liga	25	2	—		—		25	2
VfL Osnabrück	2023–24	2. Bundesliga	10	0	0	0	—		10	0
VfL Osnabrück	Total		35	2	0	0	0	0	35	2
Energie Cottbus	2024–25	3. Liga	31	2	1	1	—		32	3
Energie Cottbus	2025–26	3. Liga	31	3	2	0	—		33	3
Energie Cottbus	2026–27	2. Bundesliga	10	0	1	0	—		11	0
Energie Cottbus	Total		72	5	4	1	0	0	76	6
Career total			152	8	4	1	0	0	156	9
