= Maxwell Gyamfi =

German footballer

Personal information
- Date of birth: 18 January 2000 (age 26)
- Place of birth: Dortmund, Germany
- Height: 1.85 m (6 ft 1 in)
- Position: Centre-back

Team information
- Current team: 1. FC Kaiserslautern
- Number: 4

Youth career
- 2006–2011: TuS Körne
- 2011–2014: Borussia Dortmund
- 2014–2015: Hombrucher SV
- 2015–2016: Schalke 04
- 2016–2017: Hombrucher SV
- 2017–2019: VfL Bochum

Senior career*
Years	Team	Apps	(Gls)
2019–2020	VfL Bochum	0	(0)
2020–2022	Hamburger SV II	30	(0)
2022–2025	VfL Osnabrück	97	(3)
2025–	1. FC Kaiserslautern	27	(0)
- * Club domestic league appearances and goals as of 18 May 2026

Maxwell Gyamfi (born 18 January 2000) is a German professional footballer who plays as a centre-back for 2. Bundesliga club 1. FC Kaiserslautern.

== Career ==
=== Early career ===
Born in Dortmund, Gyamfi spent his youth playing in the youth system of several local clubs. Beginning with Dortmund-based TuS Körne at the age of 6, Gyamfi spent time in the academies at Borussia Dortmund, Schalke 04, and Hombrucher SV before joining VfL Bochum in 2017.

=== VfL Bochum ===
Gyamfi joined Bochum in July 2017, appearing sporadically with the club's U19 outfit during the 2017–18 U19 Bundesliga season. He would score his first and only U19 Bundesliga goal on 21 April 2018 in a 2–0 victory over Fortuna Düsseldorf's U19 squad. In June 2019, Gyamfi was offered a professional contract with the club. He appeared in several matchday squads during the ensuing 2. Bundesliga season, but failed to register any competitive appearances with the senior squad.

=== Hamburger SV II ===
Following the 2019–20 season, Gyamfi moved to Hamburger SV, joining the club's second team which competed in the Regionalliga. He made his competitive debut for Hamburger II on 6 September 2020 in a 1–1 draw with LSK Hansa. Following the 2021–22 season, Gyamfi's contract was not extended and he became a free agent.

=== VfL Osnabrück ===
In June 2022, Gyamfi joined 3. Liga club VfL Osnabrück. He made his competitive debut for the club on 22 July 2022 in a 1–0 victory over MSV Duisburg. In November, Gyamfi signed a contract extension with the club.

=== Kaiserslautern ===
On 26 May 2025, Gyamfi agreed to join 1. FC Kaiserslautern for the 2025–26 season.

== Career statistics ==
As of match played 24 April 2026

Appearances and goals by club, season and competition
Club	Season	League			DFB-Pokal		Other		Total	
Club	Season	Division	Apps	Goals	Apps	Goals	Apps	Goals	Apps	Goals
Hamburger SV II	2020–21	Regionalliga Nord	2	0	—		—		2	0
Hamburger SV II	2021–22	Regionalliga Nord	28	0	—		—		28	0
Hamburger SV II	Total		30	0	0	0	0	0	30	0
VfL Osnabrück	2022–23	3. Liga	35	0	—		—		24	0
VfL Osnabrück	2023–24	2. Bundesliga	32	1	1	0	—		33	1
VfL Osnabrück	2024–25	3. Liga	30	2	1	0	—		32	2
VfL Osnabrück	Total		97	3	2	0	0	0	99	3
1. FC Kaiserslautern	2025–26	2. Bundesliga	24	0	3	0	—		27	0
Career total			151	3	5	0	0	0	156	3
