= Jan Shcherbakovski =

Belarusian footballer

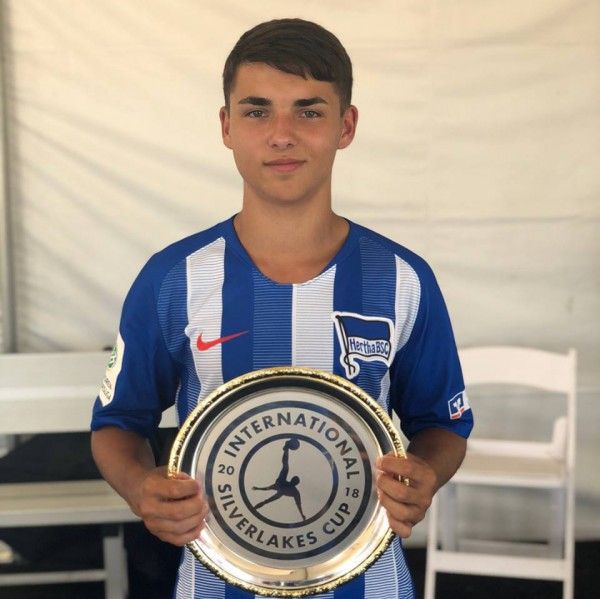
- Shcherbakovski with Hertha BSC in 2018

Personal information
- Full name: Jan Rafael Shcherbakovski
- Date of birth: 24 March 2001 (age 25)
- Place of birth: Mogilev, Belarus
- Height: 1.74 m (5 ft 9 in)
- Positions: Right midfielder; right-back

Team information
- Current team: BFC Dynamo
- Number: 8

Youth career
- Hertha Zehlendorf
- –2012: SFC Stern 1900
- 2012–2019: Hertha BSC
- 2019–2020: Hallescher FC

Senior career*
Years	Team	Apps	(Gls)
2020–2022	Hallescher FC	52	(5)
2022–2024	Dynamo Dresden	1	(0)
2023	→ Energie Cottbus (loan)	11	(2)
2024	→ Energie Cottbus (loan)	16	(2)
2024–2025	Energie Cottbus	2	(0)
2025–	BFC Dynamo	21	(4)

International career^{‡}
2019	Belarus U19	4	(0)
- * Club domestic league appearances and goals as of 22 June 2026 ‡ National team caps and goals as of 21:45, 26 September 2020 (UTC)

Jan Rafael Shcherbakovski (Belarusian: Жан Рафаэль Шчарбакоўскі; born 24 March 2001) is a Belarusian professional footballer who plays as a right midfielder or right-back for German Regionalliga Nordost club BFC Dynamo.

== Club career ==
=== Hallescher FC ===
Born in Mogilev, Belarus, Schcherbakovski grew up in Berlin. After playing youth football for Hertha Zehlendorf, SFC Stern 1900 and Hertha BSC, Shcherbakovski signed for 3. Liga club Hallescher FC in summer 2019. After 6 appearances in the 2019–20 3. Liga, it was announced in May 2020 that Shcherbakovski had signed a contract with the club until summer 2022. On his first start for Halle on 16 March 2021, he scored his first goal for the club with a finish from 8 yards in a 1–1 draw with MSV Duisburg, but was substituted off at half-time. It was his only goal in 10 appearances during the 2020–21 3. Liga. The 2021–22 season was a breakthrough season for Shcherbakovski, as he appeared in all but two of Halle's 38 matches and scored 4 goals.

=== Dynamo Dresden ===
On 31 May 2022, it was announced that newly relegated 3. Liga club Dynamo Dresden had signed Shcherbakovski on a three-year contract following the expiry of his deal at Halle.

=== Energie Cottbus ===
On 31 January 2023, he was loaned to FC Energie Cottbus in Regionalliga Nordost for the rest of the 2022–23 season. On 30 January 2024, Shcherbakovski returned to FC Energie Cottbus on another loan. On 24 June 2024, his contract with Dynamo Dresden was terminated by mutual consent. On 13 July 2024, he returned to Energie on a permanent basis.

== International career ==
Shcherbakovski has been capped for Belarus U19 national team in friendly matches, but yet to make a debut for any selection in an official competition.

== Career statistics ==
As of 31 May 2022

Appearances and goals by club, season and competition
Club	Season	League			DFB-Pokal		Other		Total	
Club	Season	Division	Apps	Goals	Apps	Goals	Apps	Goals	Apps	Goals
Hallescher FC	2019–20	3. Liga	6	0	0	0	0	0	6	0
Hallescher FC	2020–21	3. Liga	10	1	—		0	0	10	1
Hallescher FC	2021–22	3. Liga	36	4	—		0	0	36	4
Hallescher FC	Total		52	5	0	0	0	0	52	5
Dynamo Dresden	2022–23	3. Liga	0	0	0	0	0	0	0	0
Career total			52	5	0	0	0	0	52	5
