= Dominik Pelivan =

German-Croatian footballer

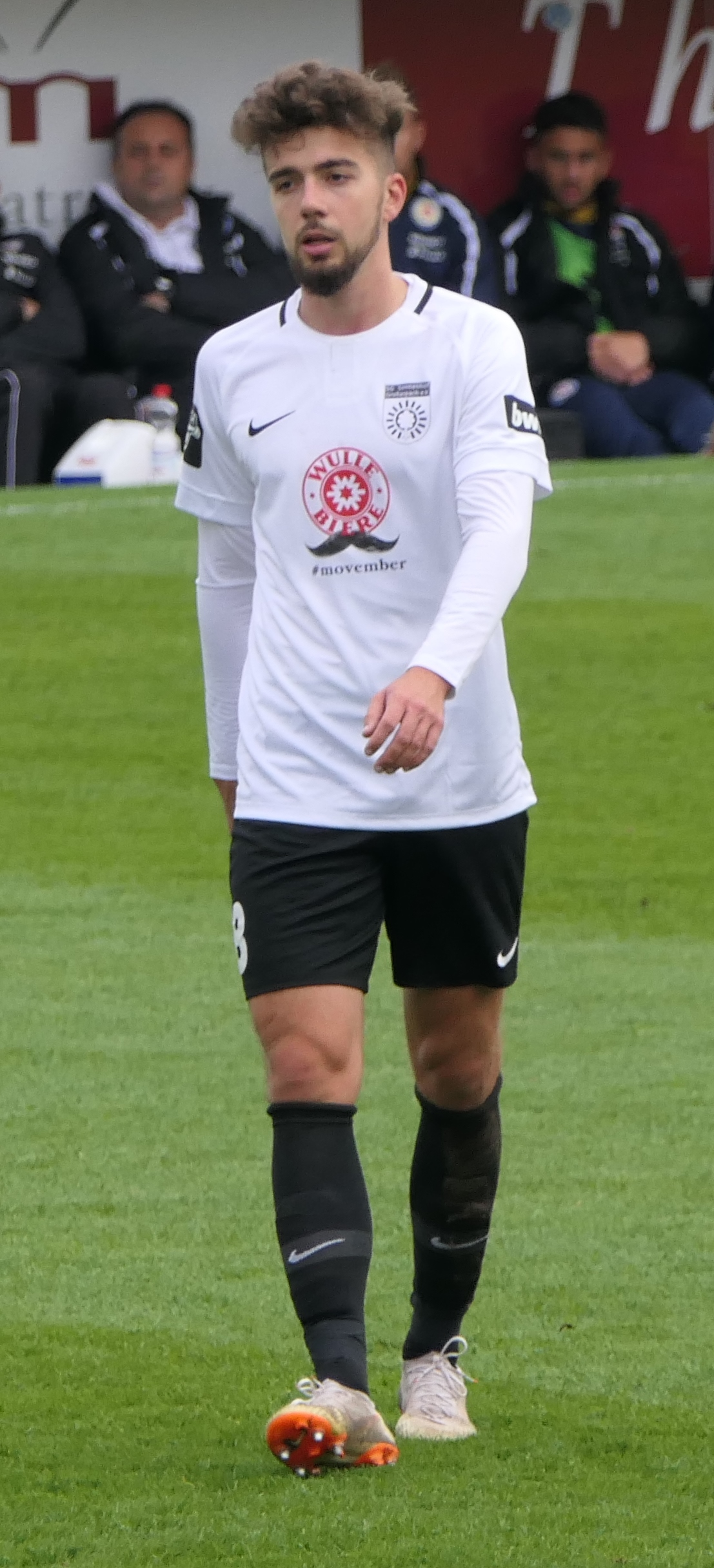
- Pelivan in 2018

Personal information
- Full name: Dominik Pelivan
- Date of birth: 8 June 1996 (age 30)
- Place of birth: Berlin, Germany
- Height: 1.85 m (6 ft 1 in)
- Positions: Centre back; defensive midfielder

Team information
- Current team: Energie Cottbus
- Number: 5

Youth career
- 2002–2004: SpVgg Tiergarten
- 2004–2015: Hertha BSC

Senior career*
Years	Team	Apps	(Gls)
2015–2017	Hertha BSC II	56	(5)
2017–2019	Sonnenhof Großaspach	44	(5)
2020–2021	Energie Cottbus	17	(2)
2021–2023	Chemnitzer FC	24	(1)
2023–	Energie Cottbus	99	(1)
- * Club domestic league appearances and goals as of 28 May 2026

Dominik Pelivan (born 8 June 1996) is a German footballer who plays as a centre back or defensive midfielder for Energie Cottbus. He has previously played for Hertha BSC II, Sonnenhof Großaspach and Chemnitzer FC.

== Career ==
=== Early career ===
Pelivan started his youth career at SpVgg Tiergarten in 2002 and joined Hertha BSC in 2004. He progressed through Hertha's youth teams and was part of the Hertha team that won the Youth DFB-Pokal in the 2014–15 season after beating Energie Cottbus in the final. For the 2015–16 season, Pelivan played for the Hertha BSC II side, scoring twice in 29 appearances in the Regionalliga Nordost, and picked up three goals in 27 matches the following season.

=== Sonnenhof Großaspach ===
In July 2017, Pelivan joined 3. Liga club Sonnenhof Großaspach on a two-year contract. He was not a regular starter during his first season at the club, appearing in 16 of Großaspach's league games, but established himself in the club's starting XI at the beginning of the 2018–19 season. He scored five goals in 28 matches as Großaspach avoided relegation on the final day of the season with a 2–0 win over Viktoria Köln, in which Pelivan scored the opening goal.

=== Energie Cottbus ===
Having been out of contract since leaving Großaspach in summer 2019, Pelivan joined Energie Cottbus of the Regionalliga Nordost on 30 January 2020. He played 5 times during the 2019–20 season before extending his contract on 30 June 2020. He scored twice in 12 matches up until the end of October, but failed to appear again that season, later suffering a calf injury.

=== Chemnitzer FC ===
In May 2021, it was announced that Pelivan had joined Chemnitzer FC on a free transfer. He was unavailable for most of his first season at the club through injury, eventually making his debut for the club as a substitute in a 2–0 victory over Hertha BSC II on 16 February 2022. He made his full debut on 16 March 2022 in a 4–1 win over VSG Altglienicke, and scored his first league goal of the season in April with the winning goal in a 2–1 victory over FC Eilenburg with a left-footed goal from the edge of the penalty area after a corner. He ended the season with one goal in twelve Regionalliga Nordost matches.

On 17 May 2022, Pelivan extended his contract for the following season. In October 2022, having made 7 appearances so far in the league, Pelivan fractured the bone in his right calf, leaving him unavailable for months. He made a single appearance in February 2022, before returning to Chemnitz's first team in May and making a further four appearances. He left Chemnitz at the end of the season following the end of his contract.

=== Return to Energie Cottbus ===
On 26 June 2023, it was announced that Pelivan had re-signed for former club Energie Cottbus. In August 2023, Pelivan scored an own goal to put Cottbus 1–0 down three minutes into a DFB-Pokal first round match against SC Paderborn; Cottbus went on to lose the match 7–0. This own goal was nominated for German football's "Kacktor des Monats" ("worst goal of the month") award for August 2023. He appeared in 29 Regionalliga Nordost games across the 2023–24 season, as Cottbus finished top of the league and were promoted to the 3. Liga. He was also a substitute in the Brandenburg Cup final as Cottbus beat SV Babelsberg 03 by a score of 3–1.

In October 2024, Pelivan was again nominated for the "Kacktor des Monats" after scoring an own goal in a 3–2 Brandenburg Cup win over SV Babelsberg 03. In December 2024, manager Claus-Dieter Wollitz announced that the club had arrived at a verbal agreement with Pelivan to extend his contract beyond the end of the 2024–25 season. This contract extension was confirmed in March 2025.

== Style of play ==
Pelivan can play as a central defender or as a defensive midfielder.

== Personal life ==
Pelivan was born in Berlin. He is of Croatian descent. He turned down a call-up to the Croatia under-18 national team to travel with the Germany under-18 side instead in 2013.

== Career statistics ==
As of match played 26 April 2025

Appearances and goals by club, season and competition
Club	Season	League			DFB-Pokal		Other		Total	
Club	Season	Division	Apps	Goals	Apps	Goals	Apps	Goals	Apps	Goals
Hertha BSC II	2015–16	Regionalliga Nordost	29	2	—		0	0	29	2
Hertha BSC II	2016–17	Regionalliga Nordost	27	3	—		0	0	27	3
Hertha BSC II	Total		56	5	0	0	0	0	56	5
Sonnenhof Großaspach	2017–18	3. Liga	16	0	—		0	0	16	0
Sonnenhof Großaspach	2018–19	3. Liga	28	5	—		0	0	28	5
Sonnenhof Großaspach	Total		44	5	0	0	0	0	44	5
Energie Cottbus	2019–20	Regionalliga Nordost	5	0	—		0	0	5	0
Energie Cottbus	2020–21	Regionalliga Nordost	12	2	—		0	0	12	2
Energie Cottbus	Total		17	2	0	0	0	0	17	2
Chemnitzer FC	2021–22	Regionalliga Nordost	12	1	—		0	0	12	1
Chemnitzer FC	2022–23	Regionalliga Nordost	12	0	1	0	0	0	13	0
Chemnitzer FC	Total		24	1	1	0	0	0	25	1
Energie Cottbus	2023–24	Regionalliga Nordost	29	0	1	0	0	0	30	0
Energie Cottbus	2024–25	3. Liga	31	1	1	0	0	0	32	1
Energie Cottbus	Total		60	1	2	0	0	0	62	1
Career total			201	14	3	0	0	0	204	14
