= Tim Campulka =

German footballer

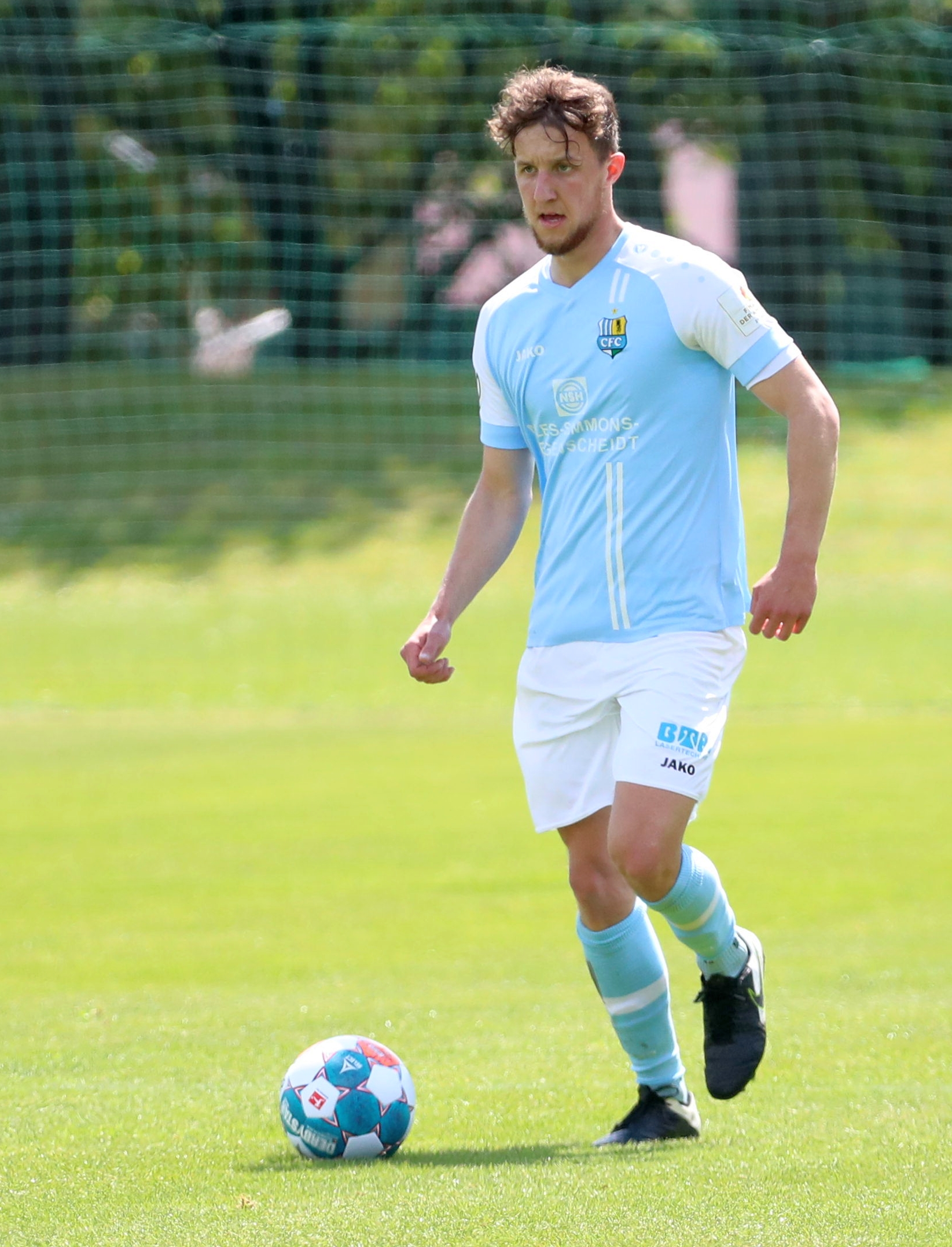
- Campulka playing for Chemnitzer FC in May 2021

Personal information
- Date of birth: 28 April 1999 (age 27)
- Place of birth: Bad Schlema, Germany
- Height: 1.86 m (6 ft 1 in)
- Positions: Centre back; defensive midfielder

Team information
- Current team: Energie Cottbus
- Number: 4

Youth career
- –2013: Erzgebirge Aue
- 2014–2018: Chemnitzer FC

Senior career*
Years	Team	Apps	(Gls)
2018–2023	Chemnitzer FC	99	(14)
2023–	Energie Cottbus	64	(7)
- * Club domestic league appearances and goals as of 28 May 2026

Tim Campulka (born 28 April 1999) is a German footballer who plays as a midfielder for Energie Cottbus.

== Career ==
In summer 2022, with his contract set to expire, he extended his contract with Chemnitz to summer 2023.

He left the club in summer 2023 at the end of his contract, and joined Regionalliga Nordost rivals Energie Cottbus.

== Style of play ==
Campulka can play as a centre back or as a defensive midfielder.
