= Dave Gnaase =

German footballer

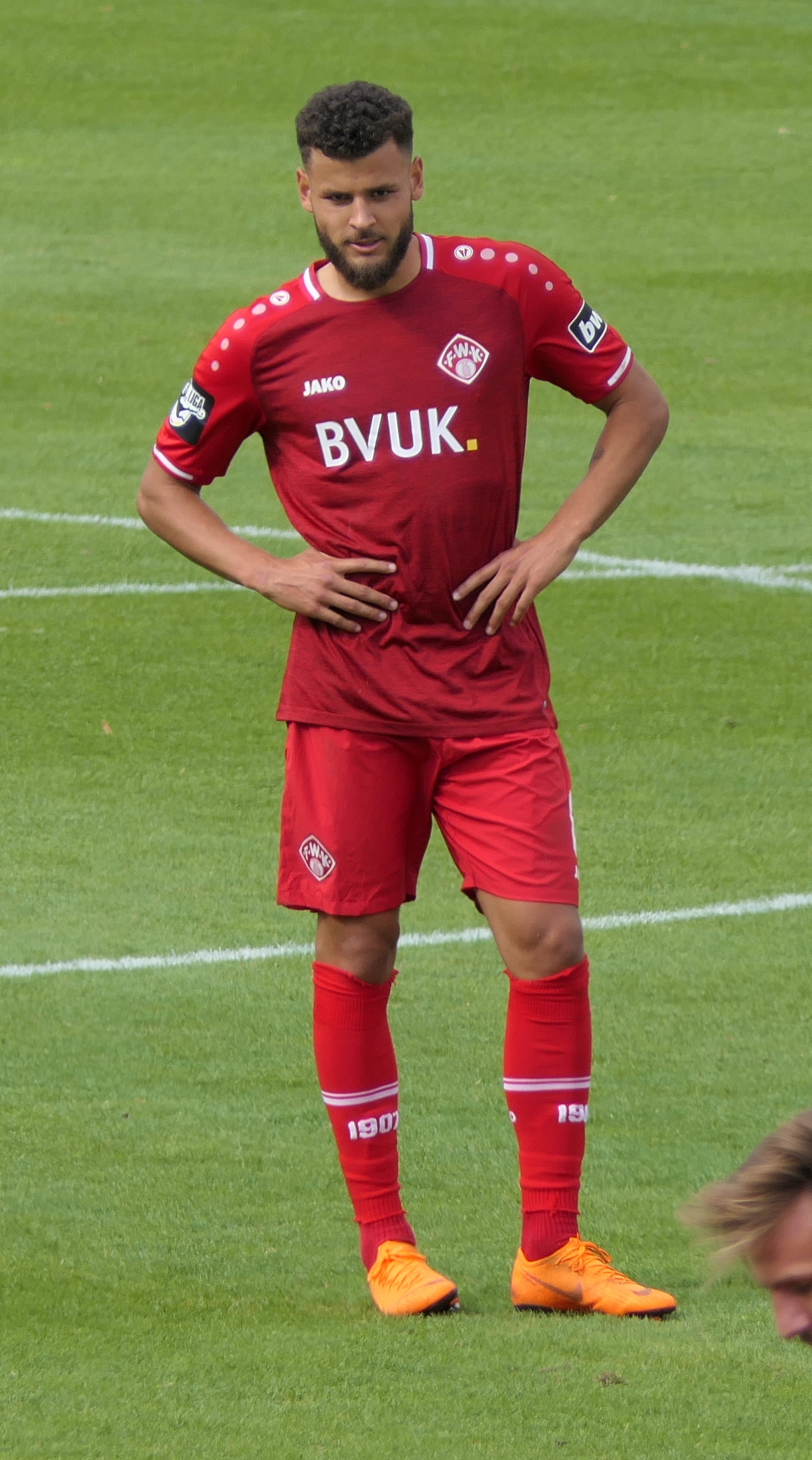
- Gnaase in 2018

Personal information
- Date of birth: 14 December 1996 (age 29)
- Place of birth: Schwäbisch Gmünd, Germany
- Height: 1.80 m (5 ft 11 in)
- Position: Midfielder

Team information
- Current team: Polonia Warsaw
- Number: 6

Youth career
- –2010: SG Bettringen
- 2010–2015: 1. FC Heidenheim

Senior career*
Years	Team	Apps	(Gls)
2015–2018	1. FC Heidenheim	9	(0)
2016	→ SpVgg Neckarelz (loan)	13	(1)
2018–2020	Würzburger Kickers	64	(6)
2020–2021	KFC Uerdingen	35	(0)
2021–2023	1. FC Saarbrücken	61	(2)
2023–2025	VfL Osnabrück	67	(7)
2025–	Polonia Warsaw	33	(4)
- * Club domestic league appearances and goals as of 15:22, 29 May 2026 (UTC)

Dave Gnaase (born 14 December 1996) is a German professional footballer who plays as a midfielder for I liga club Polonia Warsaw.

== Career ==
Gnaase came through the youth ranks at 1. FC Heidenheim, and made nine appearances for the senior team.

Gnaase joined SpVgg Neckarelz on loan ahead of the 2016–17 season.

Gnaase signed for Würzburger Kickers ahead of the 2018–19 season. In two seasons with the team, Gnaase scored seven goals in 74 matches across all competitions.

Ahead of the 2020–21 season, Gnaase joined 3. Liga team KFC Uerdingen 05.

On 24 May 2021, it was announced that Gnaase had signed with 3. Liga team 1. FC Saarbrücken.

On 13 June 2023, Gnaase agreed to join VfL Osnabrück.

On 4 July 2025, Gnaase signed a two-year contract with Polish second tier club Polonia Warsaw.
