= Tolga Ciğerci =

Turkish footballer

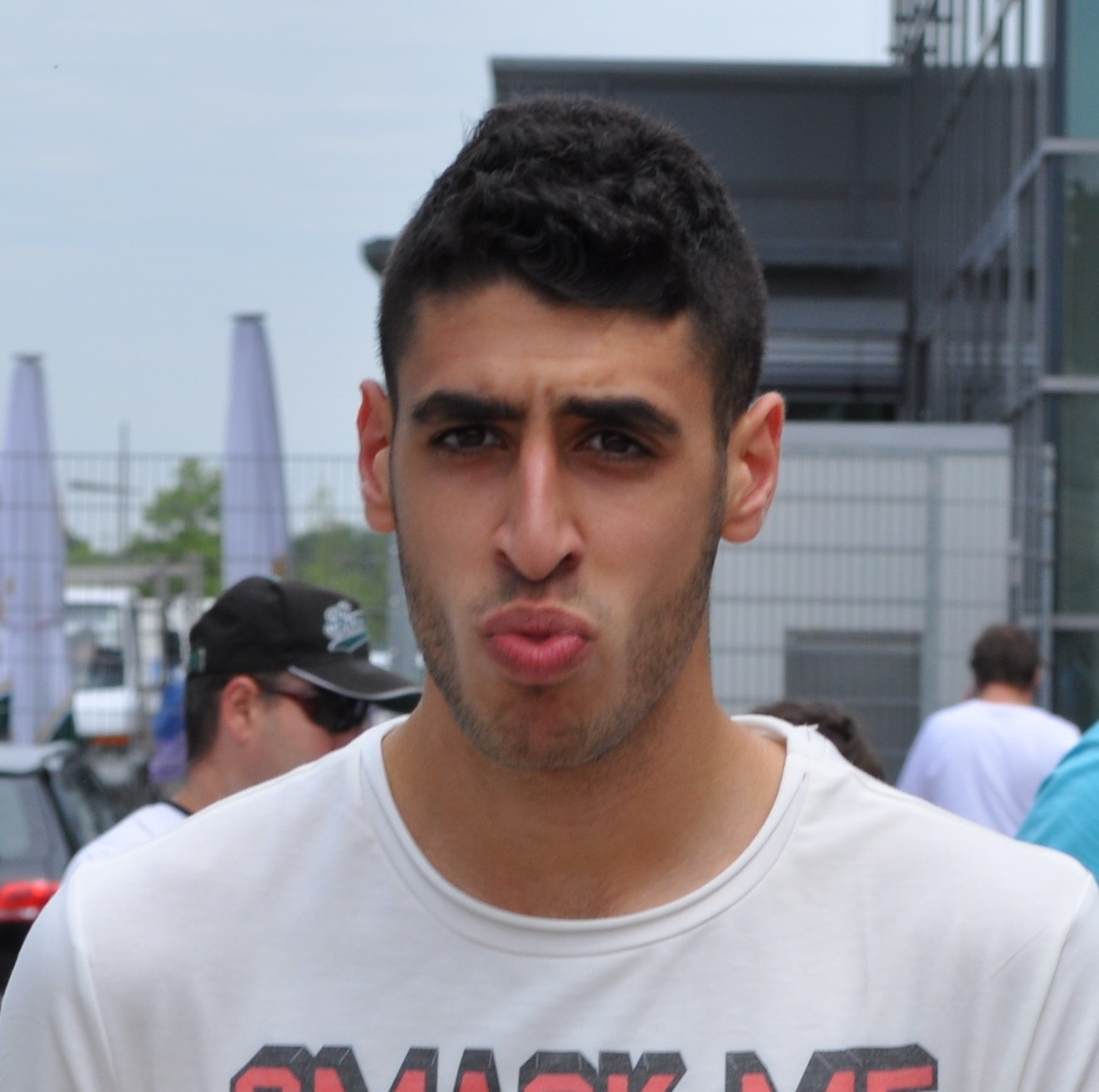
- Ciğerci in 2012

Personal information
- Date of birth: 23 March 1992 (age 34)
- Place of birth: Nordenham, Germany
- Height: 1.85 m (6 ft 1 in)
- Position: Defensive midfielder

Team information
- Current team: VSG Altglienicke
- Number: 14

Youth career
- 2005–2010: VfL Wolfsburg

Senior career*
Years	Team	Apps	(Gls)
2010–2013	VfL Wolfsburg II	20	(3)
2010–2014	VfL Wolfsburg	6	(0)
2012–2013	→ Borussia Mönchengladbach (loan)	14	(0)
2012	→ Borussia Mönchengladbach II (loan)	5	(1)
2013–2014	→ Hertha BSC (loan)	19	(1)
2014–2016	Hertha BSC	22	(0)
2015	Hertha BSC II	2	(0)
2016–2018	Galatasaray	42	(6)
2018–2021	Fenerbahçe U21	30	(2)
2019	Fenerbahçe	2	(0)
2021–2022	İstanbul Başakşehir	46	(2)
2022–2023	MKE Ankaragücü	16	(2)
2023	Hertha BSC	11	(0)
2023–2025	MKE Ankaragücü	27	(5)
2025	Sivasspor	12	(0)
2026	Energie Cottbus	10	(1)
2026–	VSG Altglienicke	0	(0)

International career^{‡}
2010–2011	Germany U19	6	(1)
2011	Germany U20	2	(0)
2016–2022	Turkey	4	(0)
- * Club domestic league appearances and goals as of 28 May 2026 ‡ National team caps and goals as of 15 April 2018

Tolga Ciğerci (Turkish pronunciation: [ˈtoɫɡa ˈdʒiːeɾdʒi]; born 23 March 1992) is a professional footballer who plays as a defensive midfielder for Regionalliga Nordost club VSG Altglienicke. Born in Germany, he represented it at under-19 and under-20 level, before switching his allegiance to Turkey.

== Club career ==
Ciğerci signed a three-year deal on 14 April 2014 with Hertha BSC to move permanently, after a full season on loan.

Ciğerci signed a three-year contract with Turkish club Galatasaray on 8 August 2016 for an initial fee of €3 million.

On 31 January 2023, Ciğerci returned to Hertha BSC on a 1.5-year deal.

On 11 July 2023, Ciğerci returned back to MKE Ankaragücü on a 2-year contract.

On 2 February 2026, Ciğerci signed with Energie Cottbus in 3. Liga, reuniting with his brother Tolcay.

On 6 July 2026, Ciğerci joined VSG Altglienicke in the fourth-tier Regionalliga. His brother Tolcay previously played for the club.

== International career ==
Ciğerci played for Germany U-19 and U-20 teams, however, he chose to represent Turkey at senior level and was called up by manager Fatih Terim for Turkey's friendly match against Russia on 31 August 2016 and subsequently made his debut in a World Cup 2018 qualifying 1-1 tie against Croatia.

== Personal life ==
His younger brother, Tolcay Ciğerci, is also a midfielder, and made his professional debut for Hamburger SV in 2014.

== Career statistics ==
As of 8 August 2022

Appearances and goals by club, season and competition
Club	Season	League			Cup		Continental		Other		Total	
Club	Season	Division	Apps	Goals	Apps	Goals	Apps	Goals	Apps	Goals	Apps	Goals
VfL Wolfsburg	2010–11	Bundesliga	6	0	1	0	0	0	–		7	0
VfL Wolfsburg II	2010–11	Regionalliga Nord	9	1	–		–		–		9	1
VfL Wolfsburg II	2010–11	Regionalliga Nord	11	2	–		–		–		11	2
VfL Wolfsburg II	Total		20	3	0	0	0	0	0	0	20	3
Borussia Mönchengladbach (loan)	2011–12	Bundesliga	2	0	0	0	0	0	–		2	0
Borussia Mönchengladbach (loan)	2012–13	Bundesliga	12	0	0	0	6	1	–		18	1
Borussia Mönchengladbach (loan)	Total		14	0	0	0	6	1	0	0	20	1
Borussia Mönchengladbach II (loan)	2011–12	Regionalliga West	4	1	–		–		–		4	1
Borussia Mönchengladbach II (loan)	2012–13	Regionalliga West	1	0	–		–		–		1	0
Borussia Mönchengladbach II (loan)	Total		5	1	0	0	0	0	0	0	5	1
Hertha BSC (loan)	2013–14	Bundesliga	19	1	1	0	0	0	–		20	1
Hertha BSC II (loan)	2013–14	Regionalliga Nordost	2	0	–		–		–		2	0
Hertha BSC	2014–15	Bundesliga	2	0	0	0	0	0	–		2	0
Hertha BSC	2015–16	Bundesliga	18	0	1	0	0	0	–		19	0
Hertha BSC	Total		20	0	1	0	0	0	0	0	21	0
Galatasaray	2016–17	Süper Lig	24	0	0	0	0	0	1 (Note: Appearance in Turkish Super Cup)	0	25	0
Galatasaray	2017–18	Süper Lig	18	6	4	0	2	0	–		24	6
Galatasaray	Total		42	6	4	0	2	0	1	0	49	6
Fenerbahçe	2018–19	Süper Lig	0	0	0	0	0	0	–		0	0
Fenerbahçe	2019–20	Süper Lig	26	2	7	0	0	0	–		33	2
Fenerbahçe	2020–21	Süper Lig	4	0	0	0	0	0	–		4	0
Fenerbahçe	Total		30	2	7	0	0	0	0	0	37	2
Fenerbahçe U21	2018–19	U21 Ligi	2	0	–		–		–		2	0
İstanbul Başakşehir	2020–21	Süper Lig	14	1	1	0	0	0	–		15	1
İstanbul Başakşehir	2021–22	Süper Lig	32	1	0	0	0	0	–		32	1
İstanbul Başakşehir	Total		46	2	1	0	0	0	0	0	47	1
Career total			206	15	15	0	8	1	1	0	230	16

== Honours ==
Galatasaray

- Süper Lig: 2017–18
