= Alexander Sebald =

German footballer

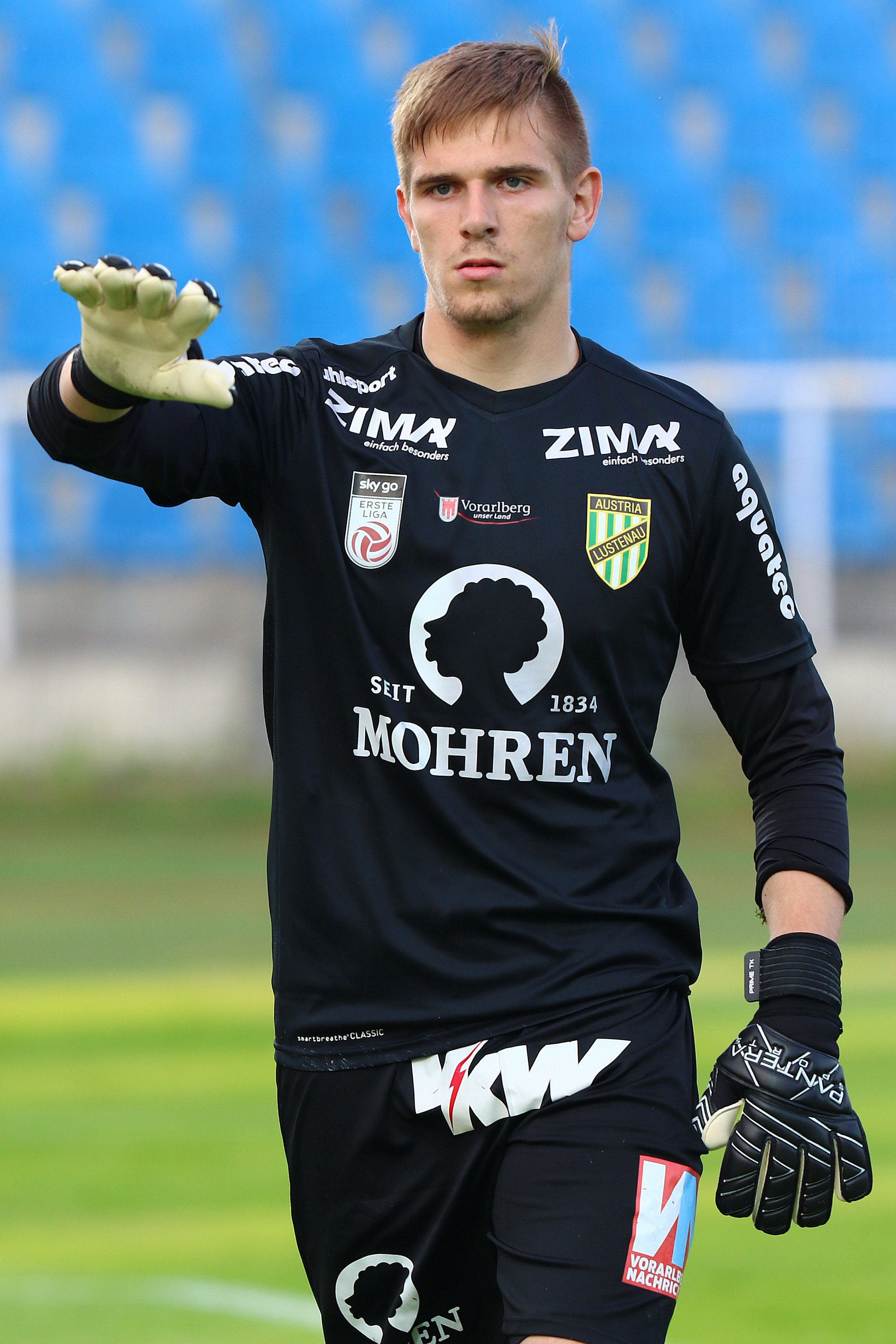
- Sebald with Austria Lustenau in 2018

Personal information
- Date of birth: 27 July 1996 (age 30)
- Place of birth: Germany
- Height: 1.89 m (6 ft 2 in)
- Position: Goalkeeper

Youth career
- 2001–2006: SV Gößweinstein
- 2006–2014: Greuther Fürth

Senior career*
Years	Team	Apps	(Gls)
2014–2015	Greuther Fürth II	12	(0)
2015–2017	Kickers Offenbach	17	(0)
2017–2018	Austria Lustenau	22	(0)
2018–2020	Hansa Rostock	1	(0)
2020–2022	SV Rödinghausen	62	(1)
2022–2026	Energie Cottbus	23	(0)
- * Club domestic league appearances and goals

Alexander Sebald (born 27 July 1996) is a German former professional footballer who played as a goalkeeper.

== Career ==
Sebald made his Austrian Football First League debut for SC Austria Lustenau on 21 July 2017 in a game against Floridsdorfer AC.
