= Erik Engelhardt =

German footballer (born 1998)

Personal information
- Date of birth: 18 April 1998 (age 28)
- Place of birth: Kulmbach, Germany
- Height: 1.79 m (5 ft 10 in)
- Position: Forward

Team information
- Current team: Energie Cottbus
- Number: 18

Youth career
- –2011: SpVgg Bayern Hof
- 2011–2017: 1. FC Nürnberg

Senior career*
Years	Team	Apps	(Gls)
2017–2019	1. FC Nürnberg II	66	(16)
2019–2021	Hansa Rostock	13	(1)
2020	Hansa Rostock II	2	(0)
2021–2022	Energie Cottbus	34	(19)
2022–2025	VfL Osnabrück	80	(23)
2025–	Energie Cottbus	56	(24)

International career^{‡}
2013	Germany U16	2	(1)
2016	Germany U18	1	(0)
2016	Germany U19	1	(0)
- * Club domestic league appearances and goals as of 28 May 2026 ‡ National team caps and goals as of 21:28, 11 October 2020 (UTC)

Erik Engelhardt (born 18 April 1998) is a German professional footballer who plays as a forward for 2. Bundesliga club Energie Cottbus.

== Club career ==
Engelhardt joined Hansa Rostock in the summer of 2019 on a two-year contract.

Engelhardt joined VfL Osnabrück from FC Energie Cottbus in 2022. In the 2022–23 3. Liga season, Engelhardt scored 11 goals as Osnabrück won promotion to the 2. Bundesliga.

Engelhardt scored 10 goals in the 2023–24 2. Bundesliga, despite Osnabrück finishing last. Although his performances attracted interest from 2. Bundesliga clubs and Blackburn Rovers, Engelhardt stayed and renewed his contract with Osnabrück in August 2024.

On 2 January 2025, Engelhardt returned to Energie Cottbus.

== International career ==
He has represented Germany at under-16, under-18 and under-19 levels.
