= Lucas Copado =

German footballer (born 2004)

Personal information
- Full name: Lucas Fernando Copado Schrobenhauser
- Date of birth: 10 January 2004 (age 22)
- Place of birth: Munich, Germany
- Height: 1.81 m (5 ft 11 in)
- Position: Centre-forward

Team information
- Current team: Energie Cottbus
- Number: 9

Youth career
- –2016: SpVgg Unterhaching
- 2016–2022: Bayern Munich

Senior career*
| Years | Team | Apps | (Gls) |
| 2021–2024 | Bayern Munich II | 65 | (24) |
| 2022–2024 | Bayern Munich | 1 | (0) |
| 2024–2025 | LASK | 4 | (0) |
| 2024–2025 | LASK II | 2 | (0) |
| 2024–2025 | → Energie Cottbus (loan) | 33 | (7) |
| 2025–2026 | SC Paderborn | 9 | (1) |
| 2025–2026 | SC Paderborn II | 6 | (0) |
| 2026– | Energie Cottbus | 0 | (0) |

International career^{‡}
| 2019 | Germany U15 | 1 | (0) |
| 2019 | Germany U16 | 2 | (0) |
| 2020 | Germany U17 | 1 | (0) |
| 2021 | Germany U18 | 3 | (1) |
- * Club domestic league appearances and goals as of 18 May 2026 ‡ National team caps and goals as of 21:14, 7 January 2022 (UTC)

Lucas Fernando Copado Schrobenhauser (born 10 January 2004) is a German professional footballer who plays as a centre-forward for 2. Bundesliga club Energie Cottbus.

== Club career ==
Copado played for the youth team of SpVgg Unterhaching until 2016, when he joined the Bayern Munich youth academy. He made his debut for Bayern Munich II in the Regionalliga Bayern on 27 August 2021, coming on as a substitute in the 67th minute for Nemanja Motika against 1860 Rosenheim. He scored in the 81st minute, with the match finishing as a 6–0 win. In January 2022, Copado was called up by Julian Nagelsmann to the Bayern Munich first team, as many of the team's regulars were missing after testing positive for COVID-19. He made his professional debut for Bayern in the Bundesliga on 7 January 2022 against Borussia Mönchengladbach, coming on as a substitute in the 75th minute for Malik Tillman. The match finished as a 2–1 home loss for Bayern.

On 22 January 2024, Copado moved to Austrian Bundesliga club LASK and signed a four-and-a-half-year contract.

On 22 August 2024, Copado joined Energie Cottbus in 3. Liga on loan.

In June 2025, Copado transferred to SC Paderborn.

On 2 July 2026, Copado returned to Energie Cottbus on a permanent transfer.

== International career ==
Copado has played friendly internationals for the Germany under-15 to under-18 national teams.

== Personal life ==
Copado was born in Munich, and is the son of Eva Schrobenhauser and former footballer Francisco Copado. His father Francisco is a dual Spanish-German citizen, having been born in Kiel to Spanish migrant workers. His German mother Eva is the daughter of Anton Schrobenhauser, retired footballer and SpVgg Unterhaching patron and former club treasurer. Lucas is also the nephew of retired Bosnian international footballer and former Bayern Munich sporting director Hasan Salihamidžić (who married Esther Copado, the sister of Francisco Copado). Hasan's son and Lucas' cousin, Nick Salihamidžić, is also a footballer who has played for the Bayern Munich youth and second teams.

== Career statistics ==
=== Club ===
As of match played 7 February 2026

Appearances and goals by club, season and competition
| Club | Season | League | | | Cup | | Other | | Total | |
| Club | Season | Division | Apps | Goals | Apps | Goals | Apps | Goals | Apps | Goals |
|---|---|---|---|---|---|---|---|---|---|---|
| Bayern Munich II | 2021–22 | Regionalliga Bayern | 27 | 10 | — | | — | | 27 | 10 |
| Bayern Munich II | 2022–23 | Regionalliga Bayern | 21 | 4 | — | | — | | 21 | 4 |
| Bayern Munich II | 2023–24 | Regionalliga Bayern | 17 | 10 | — | | — | | 17 | 10 |
| Bayern Munich II | Total | | 65 | 24 | — | | — | | 65 | 24 |
| Bayern Munich | 2021–22 | Bundesliga | 1 | 0 | 0 | 0 | — | | 1 | 0 |
| Bayern Munich | 2022–23 | Bundesliga | 0 | 0 | 0 | 0 | — | | 0 | 0 |
| Bayern Munich | Total | | 1 | 0 | 0 | 0 | — | | 1 | 0 |
| LASK | 2023–24 | Austrian Bundesliga | 4 | 0 | 1 | 0 | — | | 5 | 0 |
| LASK II | 2023–24 | Regionalliga Central | 2 | 0 | — | | — | | 2 | 0 |
| Energie Cottbus (loan) | 2024–25 | 3. Liga | 33 | 7 | — | | 3 (Note: Appearances in Brandenburg Cup) | 0 | 36 | 7 |
| Paderborn 07 | 2025–26 | 2. Bundesliga | 9 | 1 | 1 | 0 | 0 | 0 | 10 | 1 |
| Paderborn 07 II | 2025–26 | Regionalliga West | 6 | 0 | — | | — | | 6 | 0 |
| Energie Cottbus | 2026–27 | 2. Bundesliga | 0 | 0 | 0 | 0 | — | | 0 | 0 |
| Career total | | | 119 | 32 | 2 | 0 | 3 | 0 | 125 | 32 |
