= Claus-Dieter Wollitz =

German football manager (born 1965)

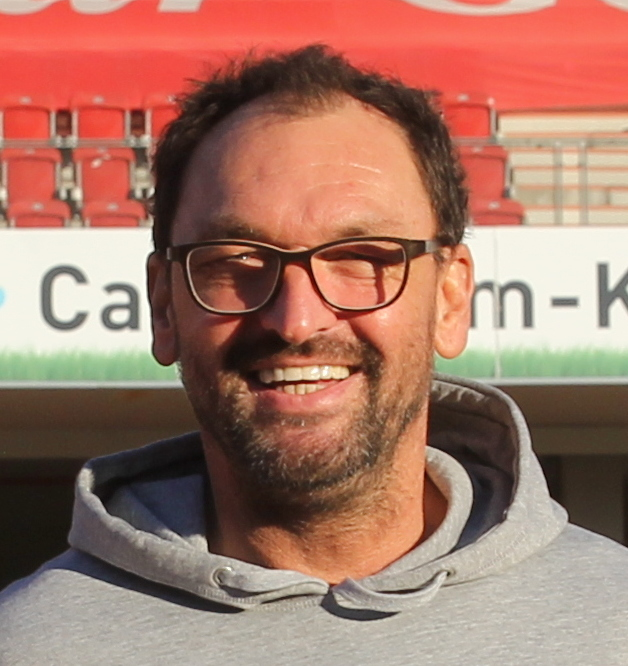
- Wollitz in 2017

Personal information
- Birth name: Claus-Dieter Wollitz
- Date of birth: 19 July 1965 (age 61)
- Place of birth: Brakel, West Germany
- Height: 1.86 m (6 ft 1 in)
- Position: Midfielder

Team information
- Current team: Energie Cottbus (manager)

Youth career
- –1983: SpVgg Brakel

Senior career*
Years	Team	Apps	(Gls)
1983–1987	SpVgg Brakel		
1987–1988	Schalke 04	29	(3)
1988–1989	Bayer Leverkusen	7	(0)
1989–1993	VfL Osnabrück	141	(43)
1993–1994	Hertha BSC	35	(6)
1994–1995	VfL Wolfsburg	32	(5)
1995–1996	1. FC Kaiserslautern	26	(2)
1996–1998	KFC Uerdingen	61	(18)
1998–2001	1. FC Köln	48	(6)
2001–2002	TuS Lingen		
Total		379	(83)

Managerial career
- 2002–2004: KFC Uerdingen
- 2004–2009: VfL Osnabrück
- 2009–2011: Energie Cottbus
- 2012–2013: VfL Osnabrück
- 2013–2014: Viktoria Köln
- 2016–2019: Energie Cottbus
- 2019–2020: 1. FC Magdeburg
- 2021–: Energie Cottbus
- * Club domestic league appearances and goals

Claus-Dieter Wollitz (born 19 July 1965) is a German football coach and former player, who is the current director of football and manager of 2. Bundesliga club FC Energie Cottbus.

== Managerial career ==
=== KFC Uerdingen 05 ===
Wollitz was head coach of KFC Uerdingen from 1 July 2002 to 30 June 2004. In the 2002–03 season, Uerdingen finished the season in 10th place with a record of 13 wins, six draws, and 15 losses. In the 2003–04 season, Uerdingen finished the season in seventh place with a record of 13 wins, seven draws, and 14 losses.

=== VfL Osnabrück ===
Wollitz was head coach of VfL Osnabrück from 1 July 2004 to 30 June 2009. His first match as head coach was a 1–1 draw on 1 August 2004 against the reserve team of 1. FC Köln. During the 2004–05 season, Osnabrück finished fourth in the Regionalliga Nord and were eliminated in round two of the German Cup by Bayern Munich. The 2005–06 season started with wins against Fortuna Düsseldorf and Wuppertaler SV and draws against Rot-Weiß Oberhausen and the reserve team of Bayer Leverkusen. Then on 21 August 2005, Osnabrück defeated Greuther Fürth in a shootout round one of the German Cup after finishing extra time 2–2. They were eventually eliminated in round two of the German Cup by 1. FSV Mainz 05. Extra time also finished in a 2–2 draw. They finished the 2005–06 season in 10th place. In the 2006–07 season, Osnabrück defeated Eintracht Braunschweig and Borussia Mönchengladbach to get to the 16th round in the German Cup where they were eliminated by Hertha BSC. The league season started on 8 August 2006 (matchday two) with a 1–0 win against Fortuna Düsseldorf. They finished the season in second place and were promoted to the 2. Bundesliga. They finished the 2007–08 league season in 12th place and were eliminated from the German Cup in the first round after a 1–0 loss to Borussia Mönchengladbach. The 2008–09 season proved to be his final season at the helm of Osnabrück. The 2008–09 season started with a loss to FSV Frankfurt in the German Cup. They finished the season in 16th place and lost both legs of the relegation playoff 1–0 to SC Paderborn 07. He finished with a record of 70 wins, 54 draws, and 63 losses.

=== Energie Cottbus ===
He became head coach of Energie Cottbus on 1 July 2009. Energie Cottbus started the 2009–10 season with a 3–1 win in the German Cup against 1. FC Magdeburg. They were eventually eliminated in round two of the German Cup after a 4–2 extra time loss to TuS Koblenz. Energie Cottbus finished the season in ninth place. During the 2010–11 season, Energie Cottbus got to the semi–final of the German Cup. They defeated TuS Heeslingen, SC Freiburg, VfL Wolfsburg, and 1899 Hoffenheim to get there. In the semi–final, Energie Cottbus lost to MSV Duisburg. On 13 September 2010, Energie Cottbus and Karlsruher SC finished in a 5–5 draw. On 28 November 2010, they defeated Erzgebirge Aue 6–0. The following week, they lost to FC Augsburg 4–0. They finished the season in sixth place. He left the club on 8 December 2011. His final match at the helm was a 1–0 loss to Union Berlin on 2 December 2011. Energie Cottbus were in sixth place at the time he left the club. He finished with a record of 40 wins, 19 draws, and 34 losses.

=== Return at Osnabrück ===
He returned to Osnabrück on 1 January 2012. He came in part way through the season and finished the 2011–12 season with eight wins, two draws, and seven losses. He left the club on 13 May 2013. His final match was a 1–0 loss to Arminia Bielefeld on 11 May 2013. He finished with a record of 29 wins, nine draws, and 16 losses.

=== Viktoria Köln ===
He became head coach of Viktoria Köln on 24 June 2013. Viktoria Köln were promoted in his first season as head coach. He was sacked on 6 December 2014. His final match was a 2–1 loss to Borussia Mönchengladbach II.

=== Return to Energie Cottbus ===
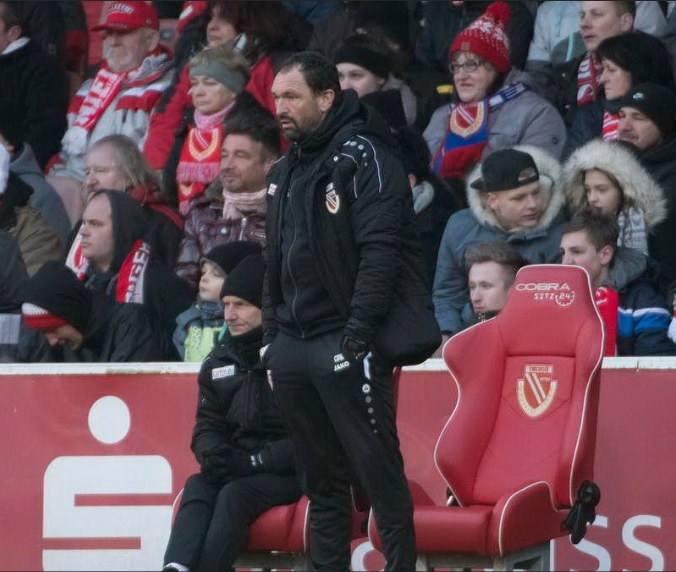
Wollitz coaching Energie Cottbus in 2018

He returned to Energie Cottbus on 12 April 2016. His first match was a 5–0 loss to Sonnenhof Großaspach. Energie Cottbus were relegated from the 3. Liga during the 2015–16 season. He signed a two–year contract extension to 2018 on 30 May 2016. He left on 20 December 2019.

=== 1. FC Magdeburg ===
He was appointed as the new head coach on 23 December 2019. He was sacked on 10 June 2020.

=== Second return to Energie Cottbus ===
On 18 May 2021 it was announced that Wollitz would once again manager Energie Cottbus starting on 1 July 2021.

== Personal life ==
Wollitz was born in Brakel and is the brother of Michael Wollitz, who played in the Bundesliga for 1. FC Köln and FC Schalke 04 and in the 2. Bundesliga for Arminia Bielefeld and FC Schalke 04.

== Coaching record ==
As of 1 May 2022

Team	From	To	Record								
Team	From	To	M	W	D	L	GF	GA	GD	Win %	Ref.
KFC Uerdingen	1 July 2002	30 June 2004	68	26	13	29	89	99	−10	38.24	
VfL Osnabrück	1 July 2004	30 June 2009	187	70	54	63	280	276	+4	37.43	
Energie Cottbus	1 July 2009	8 December 2011	93	40	19	34	152	141	+11	43.01	
VfL Osnabrück	1 January 2012	13 May 2013	54	29	9	16	84	53	+31	53.70	
Viktoria Köln	24 June 2013	6 December 2014	55	25	19	11	99	61	+38	45.45	
Energie Cottbus	12 April 2016	20 December 2019	156	95	27	34	328	166	+162	60.90	
1. FC Magdeburg	23 December 2019	10 June 2020	11	2	4	5	13	15	−2	18.18	
Energie Cottbus	1 July 2021	Present	40	24	10	6	96	26	+70	60.00	
Total			664	311	155	198	1,141	837	+304	46.84	—

== Honours ==
=== As a player ===
1. FC Kaiserslautern

- DFB-Pokal: 1995–96

1. FC Köln

- 2. Bundesliga: 1999–00

=== As a manager ===
VfL Osnabrück

- Regionalliga second-place promotion: 2006–07
- Lower Saxony Cup: 2004–05

Viktoria Köln

- Middle Rhine Cup: 2013–14

Energie Cottbus

- 3. Liga second-place promotion: 2025–26
- Regionalliga Nordost (IV): 2017–18, 2022–23, 2023–24
- Brandenburg Cup: 2016–17, 2017–18, 2018–19, 2021–22, 2022–23, 2023–24
