= Stadion der Freundschaft (Cottbus) =

Football stadium in Cottbus, Germany

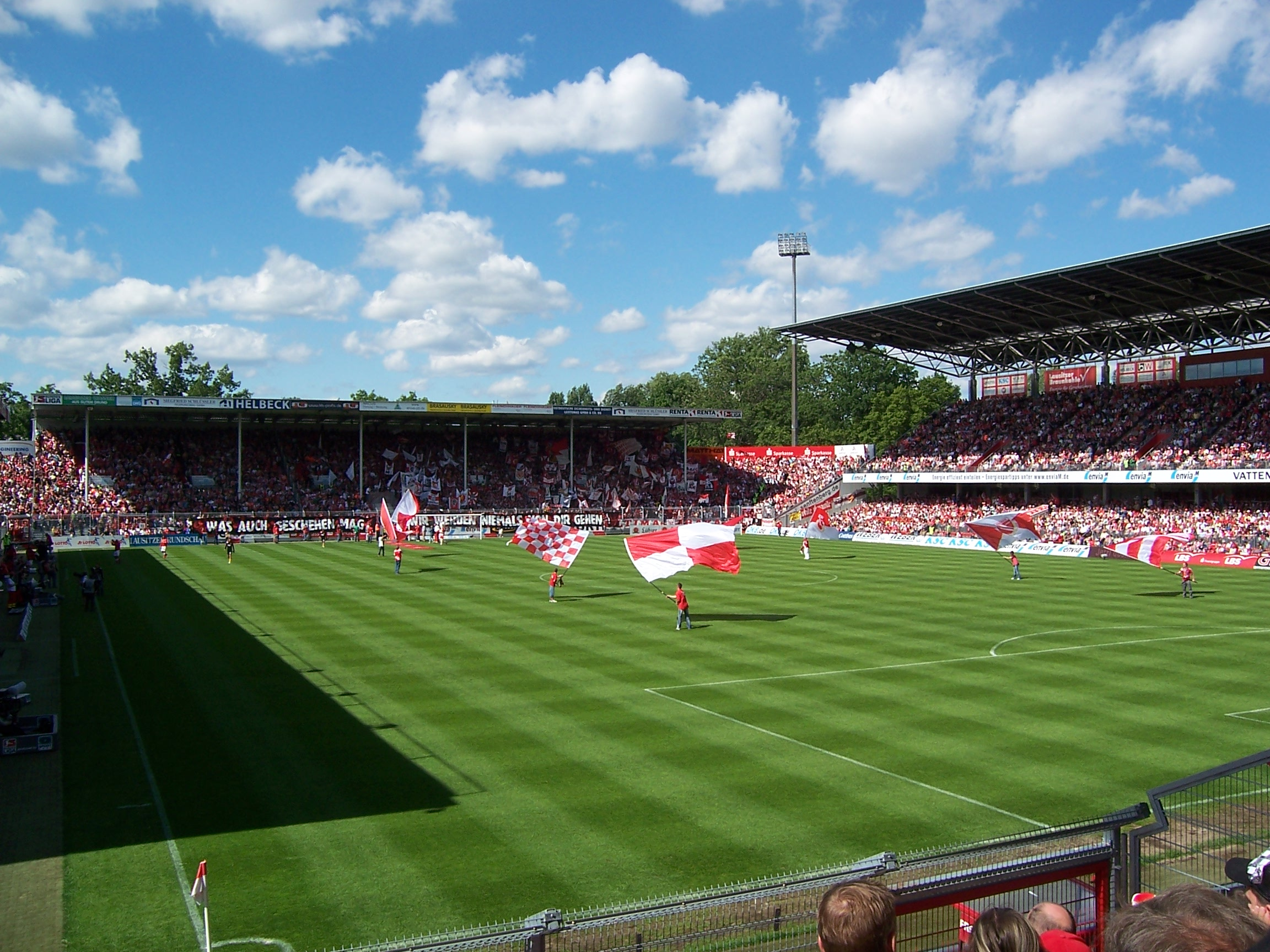
- The stadium on a matchday in 2009
- Interactive map of Stadion der Freundschaft
- Location: Cottbus, Germany
- Coordinates: 51°45′05″N 14°20′44″E
- Owner: City of Cottbus
- Capacity: 22,528 (10,949 seats)
- Surface: Grass
- Field size: 105 x 68 m

Construction
- Built: 1925–1930
- Opened: 1930
- Renovated: 1983–1988, 1995, 1997
- Expanded: 1985, 2008

Tenant
- FC Energie Cottbus

Stadion der Freundschaft ("Stadium of Friendship"; Lower Sorbian: Stadion pśijaśelstwa) is a football stadium in Cottbus, Germany. The stadium's official name is LEAG Energie Stadion. It is the home ground of FC Energie Cottbus, originally opened in 1930, has a capacity of 22,528. It is the largest stadium in the city, followed by 4,999-capacity Max-Reimann-Stadion.

== See also ==
- List of football stadiums in Germany
- Lists of stadiums
