= Tolcay Ciğerci =

Turkish footballer

Personal information
- Date of birth: 24 January 1995 (age 31)
- Place of birth: Nordenham, Germany
- Height: 1.80 m (5 ft 11 in)
- Position: Midfielder

Team information
- Current team: Energie Cottbus
- Number: 10

Youth career
- Arminia Vöhrum
- –2010: VfB Peine
- 2010–2014: VfL Wolfsburg

Senior career*
Years	Team	Apps	(Gls)
2014–2016	Hamburger SV II	30	(10)
2014–2017	Hamburger SV	1	(0)
2017	Greuther Fürth	10	(0)
2017–2018	Greuther Fürth II	25	(4)
2018–2019	Berliner AK	24	(7)
2019–2020	Berliner AK	15	(5)
2020–2021	VSG Altglienicke	10	(9)
2021–2022	Viktoria Berlin	14	(7)
2022	Samsunspor	5	(0)
2022–2024	VSG Altglienicke	66	(34)
2024–	Energie Cottbus	73	(32)

International career
2013	Turkey U18	2	(0)
- * Club domestic league appearances and goals as of 28 May 2026

Tolcay Ciğerci (born 24 January 1995) is a professional footballer who plays as a midfielder for 2. Bundesliga club Energie Cottbus. Born in Germany, he has represented Turkey at youth level.

== Career ==
Ciğerci made his professional debut on 24 September 2014, replacing Zoltán Stieber for the final 17 minutes of Hamburg's 1–0 Bundesliga defeat at Borussia Mönchengladbach.

In January 2017, Ciğerci joined SpVgg Greuther Fürth, initially playing for the club's reserves. He then joined Berliner AK 07 in the summer 2018, but left at the end of the season where his contract expired. However, he resigned from the club on 6 September 2019, signing a contract for the rest of the season.

On 11 January 2022, Ciğerci signed a 2.5-year contract with Samsunspor.

== Personal life ==
He is the younger brother of Sivasspor midfielder Tolga Ciğerci, who has played at youth level for Germany.
