= FC Energie Cottbus =

German football club

Energie Cottbus
- Full name: Fußballclub Energie Cottbus e. V.
- Nicknames: Energie; Die Lausitzer (Lusatian); Ultima Raka (Crayfishes)
- Founded: 31 January 1966; 60 years ago
- Stadium: LEAG Energie Stadion
- Capacity: 22,528 (10,949 seated)
- President: Sebastian Lemke
- Head coach: Claus-Dieter Wollitz
- League: 2. Bundesliga
- 2025–26: 3. Liga, 2nd of 20 (promoted)
- Website: fcenergie.de
Home colours	Away colours

Fußballclub Energie Cottbus e. V. (Lower Sorbian: Energija Chóśebuz) is a German football club based in Cottbus, Brandenburg. It was founded in 1963 as SC Cottbus in what was East Germany. After the reunification of Germany, Energie played six seasons in the third tier of the German football league system before floating between the 2. Bundesliga and Bundesliga for 17 years between 1997 and 2014. From 2014 to 2016, the club played in the third tier, 3. Liga, and were then relegated to the Regionalliga Nordost. In 2018, they were promoted back into the 3. Liga, only to be relegated again the next season, returning to 3. Liga in 2024. Following the completion of the 2025-2026 season, Energie Cottbus has been promoted back to Bundesliga 2.

== History ==
=== Predecessor sides ===
Energie Cottbus can trace its roots back to a predecessor side of FSV Glückauf Brieske-Senftenberg, a club founded by coal miners in 1919, in what was then called the town of Marga. FV Grube Marga, as the club was then called, was active until 1924 when the miners left to form a new team called SV Sturm Grube Marga, which was banned by the Nazi Party in 1933.

=== East German era ===
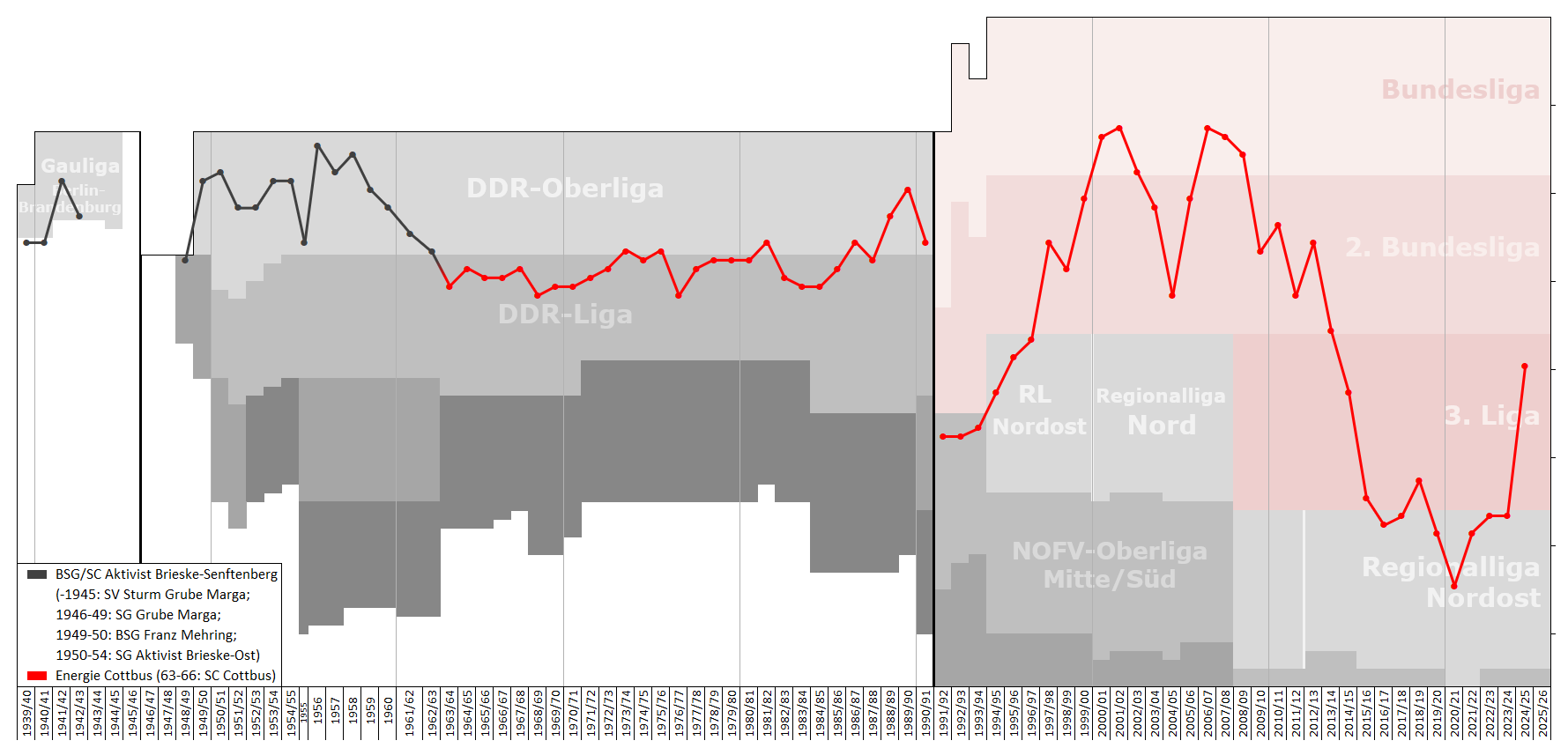
Historical chart of Energie league performance

The club re-emerged after World War II in 1949 as BSG Franz Mehring Grube, becoming BSG Aktivist Brieske-Ost in 1950. The club was re-organized as sports club SC Aktivist Brieske-Senftenberg in 1954 and played in the DDR-Oberliga generally earning mid-table results until relegation to second-tier DDR-Liga in the early 1960s. The players of this side joined the new sports club SC Energie Cottbus in 1963, whilst the reserve team merged back to BSG Aktivist Brieske-Ost to form BSG Aktivist Senftenberg. The club still exists as FSV Glückauf Brieske-Senftenberg today. SC Cottbus was quickly assisted by a wholesale transfer of players from SC Aktivist Brieske-Ost ordered by the East German authorities, who often intervened in the business of the country's sports and football clubs for political reasons. East German authorities had a penchant for tagging sports teams with the names of socialist heroes: Franz Mehring was a German socialist politician and journalist.

In the mid-1960s, a re-organization program by the regime led to the separation of football sides from sports clubs and the creation of BSG von Bodo Krautz under the patronage of a local coal mine. The football club went by that name only briefly and was quickly renamed BSG Energie in early 1966.

=== German reunification ===
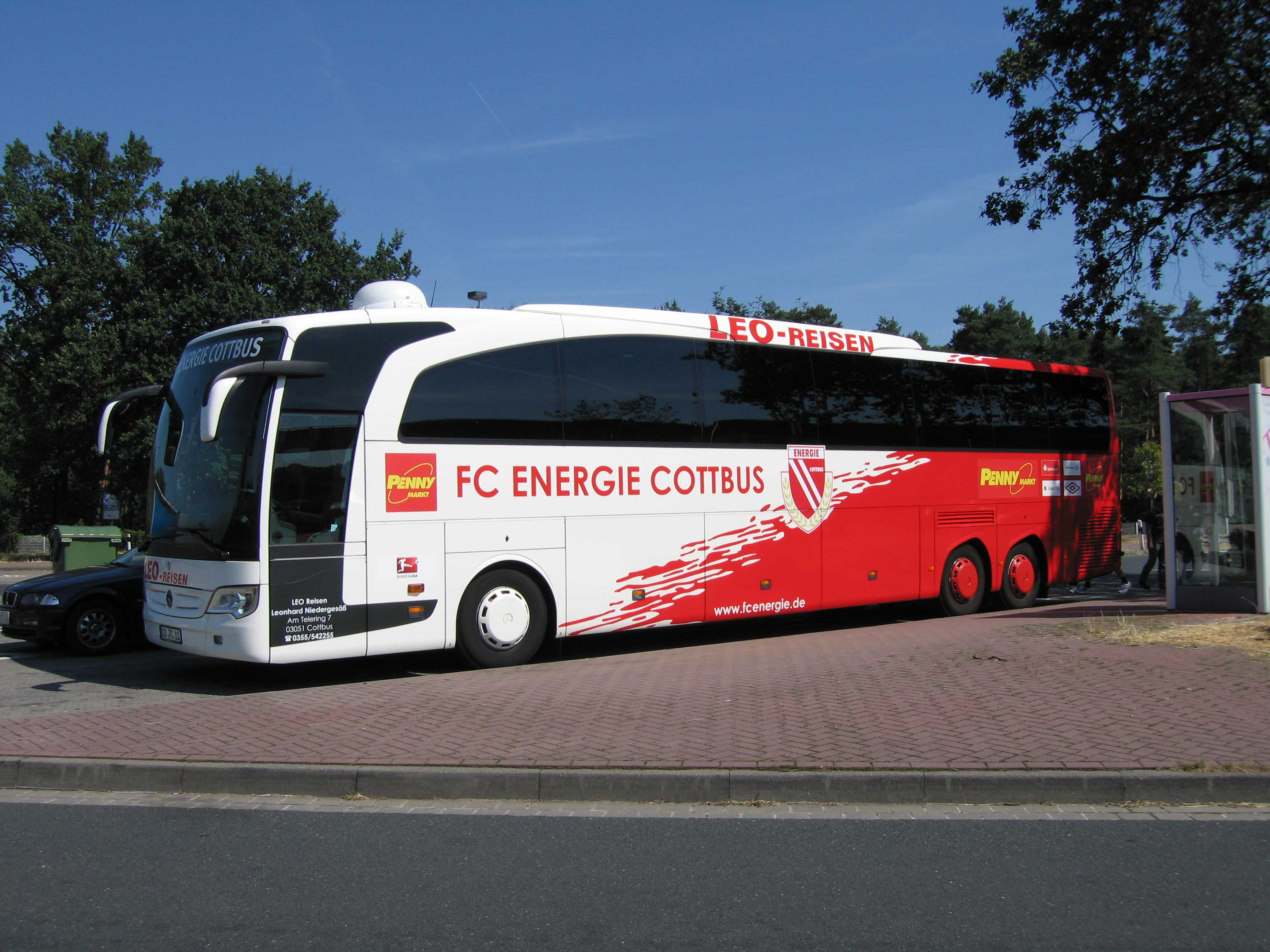
Team bus of Energie Cottbus

Previous logo

The team took on the name FC Energie in 1990 at the time of German reunification.

After years as a II division or lower-table I division side in East Germany, Energie emerged as one of the few former DDR sides to have relative prosperity in a unified Germany. After six seasons playing tier III football, the club earned returned to the 2. Bundesliga in 1997 (the same year they became the first former East German club to play the DFB Cup Final), winning the Regionalliga Nordost, and then played its way into the Bundesliga in 2000, where it had a three-year stay. A key player in the Bundesliga run was Vasile Miriuță, an imaginative midfield player. After being relegated, Energie narrowly missed a prompt return to the top tier, losing out to Mainz 05 on goal difference.

In 2004–05, Energie struggled with both financial (reported debts of €4.5 million) and on-field problems, and the club only escaped relegation to the third tier Regionalliga by scoring one more goal than Eintracht Trier while having the same number of points and goal difference. During the season, manager Eduard Geyer was replaced by Petrik Sander and chairman Dieter Krein was replaced by Ulrich Lepsch. The 2005–06 season saw the club finish third and return to the Bundesliga.

The 2006–07 Bundesliga season resulted in a 13th-place finish and 41 points, a club record total in the Bundesliga. Energie Cottbus were the only club from the former East Germany playing in the Bundesliga until they lost a relegation play-off to 1. FC Nürnberg in 2009. Cottbus remained in the 2. Bundesliga for another five seasons until 2014, when an 18th-place finish meant returning to the 3. Liga, ending a 17-season stint in the top two divisions. After a 19th-place finish in the 3. Liga in 2015–16, the club went through another return to the Regionalliga Nordost.

=== Recent seasons ===
Following two seasons in the fourth tier, Cottbus returned to 3. Liga after defeating Weiche Flensburg over two legs in the Regionalliga play-offs, but in the 2018–19 season they were returned to the Regionalliga after finishing 17th.

On 21 May 2023, Cottbus won the Regionalliga Nordost with their win over SV Babelsberg 03 in Matchweek 33. It was their third time winning Regionalliga Nordost and their first since 2018. In the promotion games for 3. Liga, Cottbus lost two games against SpVgg Unterhaching and therefore promotion failed. On 3 June 2023, Cottbus won the Brandenburg Cup for the 11th time in their history. They defeated FSV 63 Luckenwalde by a score of 4–1.

Cottbus ended the 2023–24 season as champion and was promoted to 3. Liga.

Former German chancellor Angela Merkel is an honorary member of the club.

== Club culture and supporters ==
In recent decades, FC Energie Cottbus have been associated with right-wing supporters, particularly among their ultra and fan groups. In 2005, the ultra group Inferno Cottbus caused controversy when they displayed an antisemitic banner at a game against Dynamo Dresden. In 2009, a planned pre-season friendly between Energie Cottbus and Germania Storkow was cancelled after the National Democratic Party of Germany (NPD) announced a far-right demonstration, leading the club to withdraw for safety concerns. In 2012, Inferno Cottbus supporters held up letters forming the Nazi greeting "Sieg Heil" at an away match against FC St. Pauli. In 2013, a pre-season match against the Israeli team Maccabi Tel Aviv in Austria was cancelled due to the planned attendance of 40 far-right Cottbus fans, including members of Inferno. In 2015–2017, several incidents occurred in matches against SV Babelsberg 03, where Cottbus fans directed Nazi salutes and chanted antisemitic slogans, including "Ticks, Gypsies and Jews", "Work sets you free" and other far-right messages. In 2017, after a fourth-tier match at Babelsberg, masked Cottbus supporters attempted to storm the pitch and engaged in racist and antisemitic chanting. In 2018, celebrations following Energie Cottbus' promotion to the 3. Liga were marred by fans marching in Ku Klux Klan-style hoods and displaying banners referencing Hitler, while manager Claus-Dieter Wollitz apologized for singing an anti-Romani song during postgame celebrations. In response to ongoing far-right activity, the club banned Inferno Cottbus from home and away matches in 2013 and initiated anti-racism campaigns. Despite these measures, isolated incidents and the presence of extremist fans continued to affect the club and its public image through at least 2020.

Several initiatives and fan groups have actively opposed right-wing extremism within and around FC Energie Cottbus. Most notably, the Facebook group "Energie Fans against Nazis", founded in 2017, has sought to challenge the influence of far-right supporters, advocating for an inclusive fan culture and publicly displaying banners such as “Always in the majority!” Other antifascist and left-leaning supporters, alongside external allies like SV Babelsberg 03, have also campaigned against racism, antisemitism, and xenophobia, sometimes coordinating with the club itself to promote tolerance and counter extremist behaviour at matches.

== Honours ==
The club's honours:

- DFB-Pokal:
  - Runners-up: 1997
- 2. Bundesliga (II)
  - Bundesliga promotion: 2000, 2006
- DDR-Liga Staffeln A (II)
  - Winners: 1988
  - Runners-up: 1986
- DDR-Liga Staffeln B (II)
  - Runners-up: 1973
- DDR-Liga Staffeln D (II)
  - Winners: 1975, 1980, 1981
  - Runners-up: 1978
- DDR-Liga Staffeln Nord (II)
  - Runners-up: 1965, (Note: Won by SC Cottbus.) 1968
- Regionalliga Nordost: (III/IV)
  - Winners: 1997, 2018, 2023, 2024
- German Under 17 championship:
  - Runners-up: 2004
- Brandenburg Cup (Tiers III–VII)
  - Winners: 1995, 1996, 1997, 1998^{‡}, 2001^{‡}, 2015, 2017, 2018, 2019, 2022, 2023, 2024
- DFB-Pokal U17
  - Winners: 2011

== Players ==
=== Current squad ===
As of 2 September 2026

Note: Flags indicate national team as defined under FIFA eligibility rules; some limited exceptions apply. Players may hold more than one non-FIFA nationality.

No.	Pos.	Nation	Player
1	GK	POL	Marcel Lotka
2	DF	GER	King Manu
3	DF	GER	Henry Rorig
4	DF	GER	Tim Campulka
5	MF	GER	Dominik Pelivan
6	MF	GER	Jonas Hofmann
7	FW	GER	Christian Kinsombi
8	MF	LTU	Lukas Michelbrink (on loan from Hertha BSC)
9	FW	GER	Lucas Copado
10	MF	TUR	Tolcay Ciğerci
11	FW	GER	Moritz Hannemann
13	FW	UKR	Dmytro Bohdanov (on loan from Union Berlin)
16	DF	USA	Ryan Malone
17	MF	GER	Julian Guttau

No.	Pos.	Nation	Player
18	FW	GER	Erik Engelhardt
19	MF	GER	Jannis Boziaris
20	MF	GER	Axel Borgmann (captain)
21	MF	GER	Luca Erlein (on loan from Bayer Leverkusen)
23	DF	MLI	Fousseny Doumbia (on loan from Eintracht Frankfurt)
24	DF	ANG	Anderson Lucoqui
29	GK	GER	Kevin Kratzsch
30	GK	GER	Max Böhnke
31	FW	USA	Justin Butler
32	MF	GER	Leonardo Bittencourt
40	GK	GER	Malte Wilke
42	DF	GER	Jannis Zaydan
43	MF	GER	Aaron Reschke
47	DF	GER	Joey Taubeneck

=== Out on loan ===
Note: Flags indicate national team as defined under FIFA eligibility rules; some limited exceptions apply. Players may hold more than one non-FIFA nationality.

No. / Pos. / Nation / Player; — / DF / GER / Gianluca Pelzer (at Eintracht Trier until 30 June 2027)	No. / Pos. / Nation / Player; — / MF / GER / Yusuf Wardak (at TSV Havelse until 30 June 2027)

== Staff ==
Position	Name
Head coach	(Germany) Claus-Dieter Wollitz
Assistant coach	(Germany) Tobias Röder (Germany) Daniel Ziebig
Match analyst	(Germany) Julian Thies
Fitness trainer	(Germany) Tim Schneider (Germany) Josua Skratek
Goalkeeper coach	(Germany) Alexander Sebald (Germany) Marvin-Gordon Jahn
Physiotherapist	(Germany) Bastian Rost (Germany) Bruno Martin
Sports psychologist	(Germany) Änne Wetzel
Team leader	(Germany) André Günther
Team doctor	(Germany) Dr. Hartmut Thamke (Germany) Dr. Andreas Koch (Germany) dr. med Carolin Thamke

== The all-foreign line-up ==
On 6 April 2001, Energie became the first Bundesliga club to field a side made up of 11 foreign players. Energie often fielded nine or ten foreigners that season: German players appeared a total of just 83 times, with striker Sebastian Helbig as the leader with 28.

The players were Tomislav Piplica, Faruk Hujdurović, Bruno Akrapović (Bosnia and Herzegovina), János Mátyus, Vasile Miriuță (Hungary), Rudi Vata (Albania), Moussa Latoundji (Benin), Andrzej Kobylański (Poland), Antun Labak (Croatia), Laurențiu Reghecampf (Romania), and Franklin (Brazil). As a side note, even the three substitutes were foreigners, namely Johnny Rödlund from Sweden, Sabin Ilie from Romania and Witold Wawrzyczek from Poland.

== Reserve team ==
The club's reserve team, FC Energie Cottbus II, has played as high as Regionalliga level, last playing in the Regionalliga Nordost in 2012–13. The team most recently played in the tier five NOFV-Oberliga Süd but has, in the past, also played in the northern division of the league. It first reached Oberliga level in 1998 and has won league championships in 2007 and 2010. At the end of the 2015–16 season, the team was withdrawn from competition.

In 1998, it also won the Brandenburgischer Landespokal, the local cup competition in Brandenburg, and qualified for the first round of the DFB-Pokal through this. In 1998–99, it went out losing 1–0 to SpVgg Greuther Fürth, in 2001–02 it lost 4–0 to Arminia Bielefeld.
