= 2026–27 MSV Duisburg season =

MSV Duisburg
2026–27 season
- Manager: Dietmar Hirsch
- Stadium: MSV-Arena
- 3. Liga: 2nd
- DFB-Pokal: Round 1
- Lower Rhine Cup: Quarterfinals
- Top goalscorer: League: Lex-Tyger Lobinger (7); All: Lex-Tyger Lobinger (11)
- Highest home attendance: 25,406 (vs. Meppen)
- Lowest home attendance: 17,709 (vs. Havelse)
- Average home league attendance: 21,454
- Biggest win: 3–0 vs Meppen; 3–0 vs Würzburg
- Biggest defeat: 1–2 vs Düsseldorf
Home colours	Away colours	Third colours
- All statistics correct as of 18 November 2026.

The 2025–26 MSV Duisburg season is the 127th season in the club's football history. In 2026–27 the club plays in the 3. Liga, the third tier of German football alongside the DFB-Pokal and Lower Rhine Cup.

== Team ==
As of 2 September 2026

Note: Flags indicate national team as defined under FIFA eligibility rules; some limited exceptions apply. Players may hold more than one non-FIFA nationality.

No.	Pos.	Nation	Player
1	GK	GER	Maximilian Braune
3	DF	DEN	Frederik Ørsøe Christensen
4	DF	GER	Martin Ens (on loan from SC Paderborn)
5	DF	GER	Tobias Fleckstein
6	MF	GER	Rasim Bulić (captain)
7	MF	GER	Jakob Bookjans
8	MF	SLO	Aljaž Casar
9	FW	GER	Lex-Tyger Lobinger
10	MF	GER	Christian Viet
11	FW	GER	Dominik Kother
14	MF	IRL	Conor Noß
17	MF	GER	Max Besuschkow
19	FW	NED	Ramien Safi

No.	Pos.	Nation	Player
20	DF	GER	Niklas Jessen
21	GK	GER	Laurenz Jennissen
23	MF	GER	Jan-Simon Symalla
25	MF	GER	Dennis Borkowski
26	FW	GER	Florian Krüger
27	DF	TUR	Can Coşkun
29	DF	GER	Joshua Bitter
33	GK	GER	Toni Stahl
34	MF	GER	Jannik Zahmel
37	MF	GER	Patrick Sussek
39	FW	GER	Peter Remmert (on loan from Schalke 04)
40	DF	GER	Ben Schlicke

== Transfers ==
=== In ===
Date	Pos.	Name	From	Type	Ref.
1 July 2026	FW	(Germany) Luis Hartwig	VfL Bochum II	End of loan	
1 July 2026	FW	(Germany) Gerrit Wegkamp	Schalke 04 II	End of loan	
1 July 2026	FW	(Germany) Jannik Zahmel	Blau-Weiß Lohne	End of loan	
1 July 2026	FW	(Netherlands) Andy Visser	Jong Sparta	End of loan	
1 July 2026	FW	(Germany) Dominik Kother	Dynamo Dresden	Transfer	
1 July 2026	MF	(Germany) Max Besuschkow	FC Ingolstadt	Transfer	
1 July 2026	FW	(Netherlands) Ramien Safi	Rot-Weiss Essen	Free transfer	
1 July 2026	FW	(Germany) Peter Remmert	Schalke 04	Loan	
1 July 2026	DF	(Denmark) Frederik Ørsøe Christensen	(Sweden) Brommapojkarna	Free transfer	
15 July 2026	DF	(Germany) Martin Ens	SC Paderborn	Loan	
15 July 2026	GK	(Germany) Toni Stahl	1. FC Schweinfurt	Free transfer	

=== Out ===
Date	Pos.	Name	To	Type	Ref.
1 July 2026	MF	(Germany) Mert Göckan	(Turkey) Kayserispor	End of contract	
1 July 2026	DF	(Germany) Dominik Becker	Rot-Weiß Erfurt	End of contract	
1 July 2026	MF	(Germany) Florian Egerer		End of contract	
1 July 2026	MF	(Germany) Steffen Meuer	SSV Ulm	End of contract	
1 July 2026	MF	(Germany) Leon Müller	SSV Ulm	End of contract	
1 July 2026	GK	(Germany) Julius Paris	SV Sonsbeck	End of contract	
1 July 2026	MF	(Germany) Maximilian Dittgen	VfL Bochum II	End of contract	
1 July 2026	FW	(Germany) Thilo Töpken	Borussia Mönchengladbach II	End of contract	
1 July 2026	FW	(Germany) Tim Heike	SC Verl	End of contract	
3 July 2026	MF	(Germany) Jesse Tugbenyo	TSV Havelse	End of contract	
3 July 2026	MF	(Germany) Gabriel Sadlek	Lokomotive Leipzig	Transfer	
20 July 2026	FW	(Germany) Gerrit Wegkamp	Schalke 04 II	Free transfer	
25 July 2026	GK	(Israel) Omer Hanin	TSV Havelse	Contract termination	
30 July 2026	FW	(Germany) Luis Hartwig	(Austria) St. Pölten	Free transfer	
31 August 2026	FW	(Netherlands) Andy Visser		Contract termination	
2 September 2026	DF	(Germany) Alexander Hahn	1. FC Bocholt	Transfer	

=== New contracts ===
Date	Pos.	Name	Contract length	Contract end	Ref.
29 June 2026	MF	(Germany) Rasim Bulić	Not announced		
30 October 2026	DF	(Germany) Ben Schlicke	Not announced		

== Friendly matches ==
2 July 2026 1	Viktoria Buchholz	0–21	MSV Duisburg	Duisburg
18:30		Report	Bookjans 9'; Besuschkow 17'; Lobinger 22', 33'; Sussek 29'; Coşkun 30'; Bulić 45'; Safi 51'; Kother 54', 62', 74'; Remmert 55', 67', 68', 76'; Krüger 70', 71'; Viet 72'; Casar 73'; Schlicke 79'; Bitter 83' (pen.)	Stadium: Karl-Dölzig-Platz; Attendance: 1,902; Referee: Jonah Besong

3 July 2026 2	Preußen Duisburg	0–21	MSV Duisburg	Duisburg
18:00		Report	Sussek 5', 39'; Noß 9', 29'; Welskop 19' (o.g.); Symalla 22', 31'; Remmert 25'; Fleckstein 43'; Krüger 49', 82'; Kother 50', 66', 70'; Bitter 54'; Bookjans 75'; Coşkun 79'; Lobinger 79', 81', 84', 85'	Stadium: Bezirkssportanlage Duissern; Attendance: 1,280; Referee: Ergün Martini

8 July 2026 3	NEC Nijmegen (Netherlands)	2–3	(Germany) MSV Duisburg	Netherlands
14:00	Ouwejan 50'; Kers 71'	Report	Krüger 15'; Remmert 30'; Sussek 58'	Attendance: 0
Note: The match was played behind closed doors.

12 July 2026 4	TOP Oss (Netherlands)	0–1	(Germany) MSV Duisburg	Netherlands
13:00		Report	Bookjans 21'	Attendance: 0
Note: The match was played behind closed doors and 2x60 minutes.

18 July 2026 5	Bonner SC	1–4	MSV Duisburg	Bonn
14:00	Doulashi 120+4'	Report	Ens 7'; Bookjans 83'; Remmert 87'; Krüger 105'	Stadium: Sportpark Nord; Attendance: 1,301; Referee: Jens Grage
Note: The match was played over 2x60 minutes.

22 July 2026 6	MSV Duisburg (Germany)	2–4	(Belgium) K Beerschot VA	Duisburg
18:00	Remmert 12'; Lobinger 83'	Report	Van den Eynden 16'; Haraguchi 24'; Mohamed 38'; Vula 41'	Stadium: PCC-Stadion; Attendance: 1,702; Referee: Jan Peter Weßels

25 July 2026 7	Arminia Bielefeld	1–1	MSV Duisburg	Bielefeld
15:00	Momuluh 51'	Report	Sussek 39'	Stadium: Friedrich-Hagemann-Straße; Attendance: 0 Referee: Henry Schröder
Note: The match was played behind closed doors and 2x60 minutes.

1 August 2026 8	Sparta Rotterdam (Netherlands)	0–0	(Germany) MSV Duisburg	Rotterdam
13:00		Report		Stadium: Sparta Stadion Het Kasteel

1 October 2026 9	MSV Duisburg (Germany)	1–4	(Netherlands) Go Ahead Eagles	Duisburg
	Kother 3'	Report	Christensen 8' (o.g.); Sigurðarson 10', 47'; Tengstedt 73'	Stadium: Westender Straße; Attendance: 0
Note: The match was played behind closed doors.

1 October 2026 10	MSV Duisburg (Germany)	0–2	(Netherlands) Go Ahead Eagles	Duisburg
		Report	Flataker 61' (pen.), 73'	Stadium: Westender Straße; Attendance: 0
Note: The match was played behind closed doors.

== Competitions ==
Times from 1 July to 25 October 2025 and from 29 March to 30 June 2026 are UTC+2, from 26 October 2025 to 28 March 2025 UTC+1.

=== Overview ===
Competition	First match	Last match	Starting round	Final position	Record							
Competition	First match	Last match	Starting round	Final position	Pld	W	D	L	GF	GA	GD	Win %
3. Liga	8 August 2026	22 May 2027	Matchday 1		13	9	2	2	33	18	+15	69.23
DFB-Pokal	22 August 2026		Round 1	Round 1	1	0	0	1	1	3	−2	0.00
Lower Rhine Cup	25 August 2026	18 November 2026	Round 1	Quarterfinals	4	3	0	1	19	6	+13	75.00
Total					18	12	2	4	53	27	+26	66.67

Last updated: 18 November 2026
Source: Soccerway

=== 3. Liga ===
==== League table ====
Pos	Team	Pld	W	D	L	GF	GA	GD	Pts	Promotion, qualification or relegation
1	Viktoria Köln	13	9	2	2	36	18	+18	29	Promotion to 2. Bundesliga and qualification for DFB-Pokal
2	MSV Duisburg	13	9	2	2	33	18	+15	29	Promotion to 2. Bundesliga and qualification for DFB-Pokal
3	Rot-Weiss Essen	13	8	3	2	21	13	+8	27	Qualification for promotion play-offs and DFB-Pokal
4	Wehen Wiesbaden	13	6	3	4	26	17	+9	21	Qualification for DFB-Pokal
5	FC Ingolstadt	13	6	3	4	19	19	0	21	

Updated to match(es) played on 8 November 2026. Source: DFB
Rules for classification: 1) Points; 2) Goal difference; 3) Goals scored; 4) Head-to-head results; 5) Head-to-head away goals scored; 6) Away goals scored; 7) Play-off.

==== Results summary ====
Overall								Home						Away					
Pld	W	D	L	GF	GA	GD	Pts	W	D	L	GF	GA	GD	W	D	L	GF	GA	GD
13	9	2	2	33	18	+15	29	4	2	0	15	7	+8	5	0	2	18	11	+7

Last updated: 7 November 2026.
Source: DFB

==== Results by round ====
Round	1	2	3	4	5	6	7	8	9	10	11	12	13	14	15	16	17	18	19	20	21	22	23	24	25	26	27	28	29	30	31	32	33	34	35	36	37	38
Ground	H	A	H	A	A	H	A	H	A	H	A	H	A	H	A	H	A	H	A	A	H	A	H	H	A	H	A	H	A	H	A	H	A	H	A	H	A	H
Result	W	W	W	W	L	W	W	W	W	D	L	D	W																									
Position	4	1	1	1	1	1	1	1	1	1	1	2	2																									

Updated to match(es) played on 7 November 2026. Source: DFB
A = Away; H = Home; W = Win; D = Draw; L = Loss

==== Matches ====
8 August 2026 1	MSV Duisburg	3–0	SV Meppen	Duisburg
14:00	Lobinger 8'; Schlicke 64'; Noß 84'	Report		Stadium: Schauinsland-Reisen-Arena; Attendance: 25,406; Referee: Sebastian Hilsberg

15 August 2026 2	SC Verl	2–4	MSV Duisburg	Verl
16:30	Heike 8'; Leipold 46'	Report	Krüger 61', 62'; Lobinger 69' (pen.); Sussek 72'	Stadium: Sportclub Arena; Referee: Felix Wagner

29 August 2026 3	MSV Duisburg	3–0	Würzburger Kickers	Duisburg
14:00	Lobinger 9', 15'; Viet 71'	Report		Stadium: Schauinsland-Reisen-Arena; Attendance: 19,783; Referee: Niclas Rose

5 September 2026 4	Jahn Regensburg	1–2	MSV Duisburg	Regensburg
14:00	Hermes 56'	Report	Remmert 71'; Fleckstein 81'	Stadium: Jahnstadion Regensburg; Attendance: 8,432; Referee: Ryo Tanimoto

12 September 2026 5	Fortuna Düsseldorf	2–1	MSV Duisburg	Düsseldorf
14:00	Schleusener 68'; Hottmann 86'	Report	Remmert 46'	Stadium: Merkur Spiel-Arena; Attendance: 49,325; Referee: Patrick Schwengers

15 September 2026 6	MSV Duisburg	2–1	TSV Havelse	Duisburg
19:00	Sussek 79'; Duah 90+4' (o.g.)	Report	Nduka 39'	Stadium: Schauinsland-Reisen-Arena; Attendance: 17,709; Referee: Davina Lutz

20 September 2026 7	Wehen Wiesbaden	1–4	MSV Duisburg	Wiesbaden
19:30	Schleimer 45'	Report	Kother 18', 25'; Christensen 32'; Noß 54'	Stadium: BRITA-Arena; Attendance: 4,522; Referee: Cengiz Kabalakli

10 October 2026 8	MSV Duisburg	3–2	TSG Hoffenheim II	Duisburg
16:30	Remmert 71', 72', 77'	Report	Fleckstein 22' (o.g.); Makanda 39'	Stadium: Schauinsland-Reisen-Arena; Attendance: 21,083; Referee: Leonidas Exuzidis

13 October 2026 9	1. FC Saarbrücken	2–4	MSV Duisburg	Saarbrücken
19:00	Brünker 50'; Gürpüz 90'	Report	Lobinger 29'; Fleckstein 34'; Bulić 42'; Krüger 81'	Stadium: Ludwigsparkstadion; Attendance: 13,618; Referee: Felix Weller

18 October 2026 10	MSV Duisburg	1–1	Viktoria Köln	Duisburg
16:30	Noß 28'	Report	Duman 74'	Stadium: Schauinsland-Reisen-Arena; Attendance: 25,228; Referee: Cristian Ballweg

24 October 2026 11	FC Ingolstadt	2–1	MSV Duisburg	Ingolstadt
14:00	Kother 4'	Report	Šapina 21'; Carlsen 51'	Stadium: Audi Sportpark; Attendance: 4,660; Referee: Lukas Benen

31 October 2026 12	MSV Duisburg	3–3	VfB Stuttgart II	Duisburg
14:00	Lobinger 5', 8'; Casar 11'	Report	Groiß 40'; Van der Leij 73'; Bujupi 90+3'	Stadium: Schauinsland-Reisen-Arena; Attendance: 19,513; Referee: Martin Wilke

7 November 2026 13	Preußen Münster	1–2	MSV Duisburg	Münster
16:30	Tikvić 77'	Report	Koulis 60' (o.g.); Kother 69'	Stadium: Preußenstadion; Referee: Marc Philip Eckermann

22 November 2026 14	MSV Duisburg	v	Hansa Rostock	Duisburg
19:30		Report		Stadium: Schauinsland-Reisen-Arena; Referee: Konrad Oldhafer

28 November 2026 15	SG Sonnenhof Großaspach	v	MSV Duisburg	Aspach
16:30		Report		Stadium: WIRmachenDRUCK Arena

4 December 2026 16	MSV Duisburg	v	Waldhof Mannheim	Duisburg
19:00		Report		Stadium: Schauinsland-Reisen-Arena

12 December 2026 17	Rot-Weiss Essen	v	MSV Duisburg	Essen
14:00		Report		Stadium: Stadion an der Hafenstraße

19 December 2026 18	MSV Duisburg	v	Alemannia Aachen	Duisburg
14:00		Report		Stadium: Schauinsland-Reisen-Arena

16 January 2027 19	Fortuna Köln	v	MSV Duisburg	Cologne
16:30		Report		Stadium: Südstadion

24 January 2027 20	SV Meppen	v	MSV Duisburg	Meppen
16:30		Report		Stadium: Hänsch-Arena

29–31 January 2027 21	MSV Duisburg	v	SC Verl	Duisburg
		Report		Stadium: Schauinsland-Reisen-Arena

5–7 February 2027 22	Würzburger Kickers	v	MSV Duisburg	Würzburg
		Report		Stadium: Akon Arena

12–14 February 2027 23	MSV Duisburg	v	Jahn Regensburg	Duisburg
		Report		Stadium: Jahnstadion Regensburg

19–21 February 2027 24	MSV Duisburg	v	Fortuna Düsseldorf	Duisburg
		Report		Stadium: Schauinsland-Reisen-Arena

26–28 February 2027 25	TSV Havelse	v	MSV Duisburg	Garbsen
		Report		Stadium: Wilhelm-Langrehr-Stadion

2–3 March 2027 26	MSV Duisburg	v	Wehen Wiesbaden	Duisburg
		Report		Stadium: Schauinsland-Reisen-Arena

5–7 March 2027 27	TSG Hoffenheim II	v	MSV Duisburg	Sinsheim
		Report		Stadium: Dietmar-Hopp-Stadion

12–14 March 2027 28	MSV Duisburg	v	1. FC Saarbrücken	Duisburg
		Report		Stadium: Schauinsland-Reisen-Arena

16–17 March 2027 29	Viktoria Köln	v	MSV Duisburg	Cologne
		Report		Stadium: Sportpark Höhenberg

19–21 March 2027 30	MSV Duisburg	v	FC Ingolstadt	Duisburg
		Report		Stadium: Schauinsland-Reisen-Arena

2–4 April 2027 31	VfB Stuttgart II	v	MSV Duisburg	Aspach
		Report		Stadium: WIRmachenDRUCK Arena

9–11 April 2027 32	MSV Duisburg	v	Preußen Münster	Duisburg
		Report		Stadium: Schauinsland-Reisen-Arena

16–18 April 2027 33	Hansa Rostock	v	MSV Duisburg	Rostock
		Report		Stadium: Ostseestadion

23–25 April 2027 34	MSV Duisburg	v	Sonnenhof Großaspach	Duisburg
		Report		Stadium: Schauinsland-Reisen-Arena

27–28 April 2027 35	Waldhof Mannheim	v	MSV Duisburg	Mannheim
		Report		Stadium: Carl-Benz-Stadion

7–9 May 2027 36	MSV Duisburg	v	Rot-Weiss Essen	Duisburg
		Report		Stadium: Schauinsland-Reisen-Arena

14–16 Mai 2027 37	Alemannia Aachen	v	MSV Duisburg	Aachen
		Report		Stadium: Tivoli

22 May 2027 38	MSV Duisburg	v	Fortuna Köln	Duisburg
		Report		Stadium: Schauinsland-Reisen-Arena

=== DFB-Pokal ===
22 August 2026 Round 1	MSV Duisburg	1–3	SV Elversberg	Duisburg
15:30	Lobinger 54'	Report	Schnellbacher 38'; Onyeka 88', 90+1'	Stadium: MSV-Arena; Attendance: 22,662; Referee: Max Burda

=== Lower Rhine Cup ===
25 August 2026 Round 1	1. FC Wülfrath	1–5	MSV Duisburg	Velbert
19:30	Ülker 87'	Report	Symalla 23', 65'; Bookjans 53'; Sussek 79'; Kother 83'	Stadium: IMS Arena; Attendance: 1,400; Referee: Lukas Juthe

23 September 2026 Round 2	Rheydter SV	1–2	MSV Duisburg	Mönchengladbach
19:30	Galić 55'	Report	Bookjans 2'; Lobinger 15', 47', 50'; Krüger 19', 37', 40'; Remmert 65', 89'; Kother 75'; Noß 82', 87'	Stadium: Grenzlandstadion; Attendance: 1,300; Referee: Fynn Gottschalk

7 October 2026 Round of 16	Blau-Weiß Dingden	1–2	MSV Duisburg	Hamminkeln
18:30	Kempe 16'	Report	Krüger 62'; Coşkun 66'	Stadium: Volksbank-Rhein-Lippe-Sportpark; Attendance: 2,500; Referee: Lars Aarts

18 November 2026 Quarterfinals	Fortuna Düsseldorf	3–0	MSV Duisburg	Düsseldorf
20:00	Hottmann 60'; Gerezgiher 81'; Anhari 88'	Report		Stadium: Merkur Spiel-Arena; Attendance: 31,092; Referee: Kristijan Rajkovski

== Statistics ==
=== Squad statistics ===
No.	Pos	Nat	Player	Total		3. Liga		DFB-Pokal		Lower Rhine Cup	
No.	Pos	Nat	Player	Apps	Goals	Apps	Goals	Apps	Goals	Apps	Goals
1	GK	(Germany) GER	Maximilian Braune	14	0	13	0	1	0	0	0
3	DF	(Denmark) DEN	Frederik Ørsøe Christensen	8	1	6	1	0	0	2	0
4	DF	(Germany) GER	Martin Ens	13	0	8	0	1	0	4	0
5	DF	(Germany) GER	Tobias Fleckstein	16	2	12	2	1	0	3	0
6	MF	(Germany) GER	Rasim Bulić	16	1	13	1	1	0	2	0
7	MF	(Germany) GER	Jakob Bookjans	6	2	3	0	0	0	3	2
8	MF	(Slovenia) SLO	Aljaž Casar	16	1	12	1	1	0	3	0
9	FW	(Germany) GER	Lex-Tyger Lobinger	14	11	10	7	1	1	3	3
10	MF	(Germany) GER	Christian Viet	8	1	6	1	1	0	1	0
11	MF	(Germany) GER	Dominik Kother	14	6	11	4	0	0	3	2
14	MF	(Republic of Ireland) IRL	Conor Noß	17	5	12	3	1	0	4	2
17	MF	(Germany) GER	Max Besuschkow	15	0	12	0	0	0	3	0
19	FW	(Netherlands) NED	Ramien Safi	13	0	8	0	1	0	4	0
20	DF	(Germany) GER	Niklas Jessen	11	0	9	0	0	0	2	0
21	GK	(Germany) GER	Laurenz Jennissen	0	0	0	0	0	0	0	0
23	MF	(Germany) GER	Jan-Simon Symalla	7	2	5	0	1	0	1	2
25	FW	(Germany) GER	Dennis Borkowski	2	0	1	0	0	0	1	0
26	FW	(Germany) GER	Florian Krüger	14	7	10	3	1	0	3	4
27	DF	(Germany) GER	Can Coşkun	17	1	13	0	1	0	3	1
29	DF	(Germany) GER	Joshua Bitter	14	0	12	0	1	0	1	0
32	DF	(Germany) GER	Ole Rinke	1	0	0	0	0	0	1	0
33	GK	(Germany) GER	Toni Stahl	4	0	0	0	0	0	4	0
34	FW	(Germany) GER	Jannik Zahmel	0	0	0	0	0	0	0	0
37	MF	(Germany) GER	Patrick Sussek	12	3	8	2	1	0	3	1
38	MF	(Germany) GER	Louis Blume	1	0	0	0	0	0	1	0
39	FW	(Germany) GER	Peter Remmert	14	7	10	5	0	0	4	2
40	DF	(Germany) GER	Ben Schlicke	13	1	10	1	0	0	3	0
43	DF	(Germany) GER	Reda Haddou	1	0	0	0	0	0	1	0
	DF	(Germany) GER	Alexander Hahn†	0	0	0	0	0	0	0	0
	MF	(Netherlands) NED	Andy Visser†	0	0	0	0	0	0	0	0

Last updated: 18 November 2026
Source: FBREF

^{†} Player left Duisburg during the season.

=== Goals ===
As of 18 November 2026

Rank	Player	3. Liga	DFB-Pokal	LR Cup	Total
1	(Germany) Lex-Tyger Lobinger	7	1	3	11
2	(Germany) Florian Krüger	3	0	4	7
2	(Germany) Peter Remmert	5	0	2	7
4	(Germany) Dominik Kother	4	0	2	6
5	(Republic of Ireland) Conor Noß	3	0	2	5
6	(Germany) Patrick Sussek	2	0	1	3
7	(Germany) Jakob Bookjans	0	0	2	2
7	(Germany) Tobias Fleckstein	2	0	0	2
7	(Germany) Jan-Simon Symalla	0	0	2	2
10	(Denmark) Rasim Bulić	1	0	0	1
10	(Slovenia) Aljaž Casar	1	0	0	1
10	(Denmark) Frederik Ørsøe Christensen	1	0	0	1
10	(Germany) Can Coşkun	0	0	1	1
10	(Germany) Ben Schlicke	1	0	0	1
10	(Germany) Christian Viet	1	0	0	1
Own goals		2	0	0	2
Total		33	0	19	52

=== Clean sheets ===
As of 18 November 2026

Rank	Player	3. Liga	DFB-Pokal	LR Cup	Total
1	(Germany) Maximilian Braune	2	0	0	2
2	(Germany) Toni Stahl	0	0	0	0
Total		2	0	0	2

=== Disciplinary record ===
N	P	Nat.	Name	3. Liga			DFB-Pokal			LR Cup			Total			Notes
N	P	Nat.	Name	Yellow card	Second yellow card	Red card	Yellow card	Second yellow card	Red card	Yellow card	Second yellow card	Red card	Yellow card	Second yellow card	Red card	Notes
6	MF	(Germany)	Rasim Bulić	4						1			5			
9	FW	(Germany)	Lex-Tyger Lobinger	3		1							3		1	
5	DF	(Germany)	Tobias Fleckstein	1		1				1			2		1	
27	DF	(Germany)	Can Coşkun	2			1						3			
8	MF	(Slovenia)	Aljaž Casar	2									2			
37	MF	(Germany)	Patrick Sussek	2									2			
39	FW	(Germany)	Peter Remmert	2									2			
40	DF	(Germany)	Ben Schlicke	2									2			
4	DF	(Germany)	Martin Ens	1									1			
8	DF	(Slovenia)	Aljaž Casar	1									1			
11	MF	(Germany)	Dominik Kother	1									1			
14	MF	(Republic of Ireland)	Conor Noß							1			1			
19	MF	(Germany)	Ramien Safi	1									1			
20	DF	(Germany)	Niklas Jessen	1									1			
23	MF	(Germany)	Jan-Simon Symalla	1									1			
26	FW	(Germany)	Florian Krüger							1			1			
29	DF	(Germany)	Joshua Bitter	1									1			

Last updated: 18 November 2026
Source: FBREF
Only competitive matches
(yellow card) = Number of bookings; (second yellow card) = Number of sending offs after a second yellow card; (red card) = Number of sending offs by a direct red card.
