= 2025–26 MSV Duisburg season =

MSV Duisburg
2025–26 season
- Manager: Dietmar Hirsch
- Stadium: MSV-Arena
- 3. Liga: 4th
- Lower Rhine Cup: Winners
- Top goalscorer: League: Conor Noß (10); All: Conor Noß (12)
- Highest home attendance: 30,343 (vs. Cologne)
- Lowest home attendance: 18,508 (vs. Aue)
- Average home league attendance: 22,960
- Biggest win: 4–0 vs Regensburg; 4–0 vs Stuttgart II
- Biggest defeat: 1–6 vs Wiesbaden
Home colours	Away colours	Third colours

The 2025–26 MSV Duisburg season is the 126th season in the club's football history. In 2025–26 the club plays in the 3. Liga, the third tier of German football alongside the Lower Rhine Cup. Duisburg secured promotion from the Regionalliga West, after being relegated a year earlier.

== Team ==
As of 3 February 2026

Note: Flags indicate national team as defined under FIFA eligibility rules; some limited exceptions apply. Players may hold more than one non-FIFA nationality.

No.	Pos.	Nation	Player
1	GK	GER	Maximilian Braune
4	DF	GER	Dominik Becker
5	DF	GER	Tobias Fleckstein
6	MF	GER	Rasim Bulić
7	MF	GER	Jakob Bookjans
8	MF	SLO	Aljaž Casar
9	FW	GER	Tim Heike
10	MF	GER	Christian Viet
11	MF	GER	Maximilian Dittgen
13	GK	ISR	Omer Hanin
14	MF	IRL	Conor Noß
17	DF	GER	Mert Göckan
18	FW	GER	Steffen Meuer
19	MF	GER	Leon Müller
20	DF	GER	Niklas Jessen
21	GK	GER	Laurenz Jennissen

No.	Pos.	Nation	Player
22	FW	GER	Thilo Töpken
23	MF	GER	Jan-Simon Symalla
24	GK	GER	Julius Paris
25	FW	GER	Dennis Borkowski
26	FW	GER	Florian Krüger
27	DF	TUR	Can Coşkun
28	MF	GER	Florian Egerer
29	DF	GER	Joshua Bitter
31	FW	GER	Dominik Kother (on loan from Dynamo Dresden)
33	MF	GER	Jesse Tugbenyo
37	MF	GER	Patrick Sussek
38	MF	GER	Gabriel Sadlek
40	DF	GER	Ben Schlicke
42	DF	GER	Alexander Hahn (captain)
45	FW	GER	Lex-Tyger Lobinger

=== Out on loan ===
Note: Flags indicate national team as defined under FIFA eligibility rules; some limited exceptions apply. Players may hold more than one non-FIFA nationality.

No.	Pos.	Nation	Player
—	FW	GER	Luis Hartwig (at VfL Bochum II until 30 June 2026)
—	FW	NED	Andy Visser (at Jong Sparta until 30 June 2026)

No.	Pos.	Nation	Player
—	FW	GER	Gerrit Wegkamp (at Schalke 04 II until 30 June 2026)
—	FW	GER	Jannik Zahmel (at Blau-Weiß Lohne until 30 June 2026)

== Transfers ==
=== In ===
Date	Pos.	Name	From	Type	Ref.
1 July 2025	MF	(Germany) Rasim Bulić	Jahn Regensburg	Free transfer	
1 July 2025	DF	(Germany) Niklas Jessen	Borussia Dortmund II	Free transfer	
1 July 2025	DF	(Germany) Ben Schlicke	SpVgg Unterhaching	Free transfer	
1 July 2025	MF	(Germany) Conor Noß	(Austria) Blau-Weiß Linz	Free transfer	
1 July 2025	FW	(Germany) Tim Heike	FC Ingolstadt	Free transfer	
1 July 2025	FW	(Germany) Dennis Borkowski	FC Ingolstadt	Free transfer	
1 July 2025	MF	(Germany) Christian Viet	Jahn Regensburg	Free transfer	
23 August 2025	GK	(Israel) Omer Hanin	Hapoel Haifa	Free transfer	
1 September 2025	FW	(Germany) Florian Krüger	Beerschot	Free transfer	
1 September 2025	FW	(Netherlands) Andy Visser	Vitesse	Free transfer	
2 January 2026	MF	(Slovenia) Aljaž Casar	Dynamo Dresden	Free transfer	
3 January 2026	FW	(Germany) Lex-Tyger Lobinger	Viktoria Köln	Transfer	
5 January 2026	GK	(Germany) Laurenz Jennissen	MSV Duisburg U19	Promotion	
2 February 2026	DF	(Germany) Dominik Becker	Free agent	Signing	
2 February 2026	FW	(Germany) Dominik Kother	Dynamo Dresden	Loan	

=== Out ===
Date	Pos.	Name	To	Type	Ref.
1 July 2025	FW	(Lebanon) Malek Fakhro	Hallescher FC	End of contract	
1 July 2025	MF	(Switzerland) Kilian Pagliuca		End of contract	
1 July 2025	MF	(Germany) Thomas Pledl		End of contract	
1 July 2025	MF	(Germany) Dustin Willms	Sportfreunde Siegen	End of contract	
1 July 2025	FW	(Germany) Luis Hartwig	VfL Bochum II	Loan	
1 July 2025	DF	(Croatia) Franko Uzelac	Sportfreunde Lotte	Free transfer	
4 July 2025	FW	(Germany) Gerrit Wegkamp	Schalke 04 II	Loan	
1 September 2025	MF	(Germany) Jonas Michelbrink	Fortuna Köln	Free transfer	
1 September 2025	FW	(Germany) Jannik Zahmel	Blau-Weiß Lohne	Loan	
7 January 2026	DF	(Germany) Moritz Montag	Fortuna Düsseldorf II	Contract terminated	
4 February 2026	FW	(Netherlands) Andy Visser	Jong Sparta	Loan	

=== New contracts ===
Date	Pos.	Name	Contract length	Contract end	Ref.
28 May 2025	MF	(Germany) Patrick Sussek	Not announced (multi-year)		
10 June 2025	MF	(Germany) Jan-Simon Symalla	3 years	2028	
12 June 2025	MF	(Germany) Jesse Tugbenyo	Not announced (multi-year)		
24 November 2025	MF	(Germany) Jakob Bookjans	Not announced		
30 November 2025	MF	(Germany) Can Coşkun	Not announced		
12 December 2025	GK	(Germany) Maximilian Braune	Not announced		
24 December 2025	DF	(Germany) Alexander Hahn	Not announced		
16 January 2026	DF	(Germany) Tobias Fleckstein	Not announced		
1 March 2026	DF	(Germany) Joshua Bitter	Not announced		

== Friendly matches ==
28 June 2025 1	Duisburger SV 1900	0–7	MSV Duisburg	Duisburg
15:00		Report	Symalla 1', 45+1'; Tugbenyo 9'; Zahmel 48'; Töpken 55', 59'; Schlicke 74'	Stadium: DSV 1900 Sportpark; Attendance: 1,500; Referee: Jonah Besong

2 July 2025 2	Hibernian (Scotland)	0–0	(Germany) MSV Duisburg	Epe
11:00
Note: The match was played behind closed doors.

6 July 2025 3	SV Sonsbeck	0–6	MSV Duisburg	Sonsbeck
15:00		Report	Heike 42', 43'; Schlicke 52'; Meuer 61', 86'; Symalla 65'	Stadium: Willy-Lemkens-Sportpark; Attendance: 900

12 July 2025 4	MSV Duisburg	1–4	Preußen Münster	Duisburg
14:00	Hahn 23'	Report	Amenyido 13'; Hendrix 51'; Vilhelmsson 60'; Makridis 68'	Stadium: Westender Straße; Attendance: 0
Note: Originally scheduled to be played in Marl with spectators, it was announced that the match was played behind closed doors, due to safety concerns.

16 July 2025 5	VfB Homberg	1–5	MSV Duisburg	Duisburg
18:30	Thissen 71'	Report	Bitter 27'; Sussek 36'; Borkowski 78', 84'; Heike 89'	Stadium: PCC-Stadion; Attendance: 2,000; Referee: Jonah Besong

19 July 2025 6	MSV Duisburg (Germany)	6–2	(Belgium) Lommel	Duisburg
14:00	Borkowski 29'; Sussek 52' (pen.); Meuer 86', 102'; Symalla 112'; Dittgen 119'	Report	Prijor 58'; Donne 66'	Stadium: PCC-Stadion; Attendance: 1,100; Referee: Jan Peter Weßels
Note: The match was played over 4x30 minutes.

26 July 2025 7	Kickers Offenbach	0–1	MSV Duisburg	Mayen
14:00		Report	Fleckstein 61'	Stadium: Nettetalstadion; Attendance: 0 Referee: Veron Besiri
Note: The match was played behind closed doors due to safety reasons.

13 August 2025 8	SV Wanheim	0–19	MSV Duisburg	Duisburg
18:00		Report	Borkowski 8', 27', 43'; Zahmel 13', 51', 58'; Tugbenyo 15'; Dittgen 30', 41', 53', 63', 85', 90'; Noß 54', 81'; Michelbrink 73'; Töpken 76', 83'; Paris 87' (pen.)	Stadium: Bezirkssportanlage Honnenpfad; Attendance: 800; Referee: Selman Karatas

4 September 2025 9	VfL Bochum	1–0	MSV Duisburg	Bochum
14:00	Pannewig 69'	Report		Stadium: Leichtathletik-Platz am Stadion; Attendance: 0 Referee: Leonidas Exuzidis
Note: The match was played behind closed doors, due to safety concerns.

28 June 2025 10	VVV-Venlo (Netherlands)	2–2	(Germany) MSV Duisburg	Horst aan de Maas
15:00	Kluskens 3'; Van Oorschot 52' (pen.)	Report	Noß 25'; Visser 90'	Attendance: 0
Note: The match was played behind closed doors, due to safety concerns.

9 January 2026 11	Hannover 96	2–0	MSV Duisburg	Belek, Turkey
12:00	Pichler 73'; Oudenne 88'			Stadium: Titanic Football Center; Attendance: 100

== Competitions ==
Times from 1 July to 25 October 2025 and from 29 March to 30 June 2026 are UTC+2, from 26 October 2025 to 28 March 2025 UTC+1.

=== Overview ===
Competition	First match	Last match	Starting round	Final position	Record							
Competition	First match	Last match	Starting round	Final position	Pld	W	D	L	GF	GA	GD	Win %
3. Liga	2 August 2025	16 May 2025	Matchday 1	Fourth place	38	19	11	8	66	49	+17	50.00
Lower Rhine Cup	20 August 2025	23 May 2026	Round 1	Winners	6	6	0	0	21	3	+18	100.00
Total					44	25	11	8	87	52	+35	56.82

Last updated: 23 May 2026
Source: Soccerway

=== 3. Liga ===
==== League table ====
Pos	Team	Pld	W	D	L	GF	GA	GD	Pts	Promotion, qualification or relegation
2	Energie Cottbus (P)	38	21	9	8	72	51	+21	72	Promotion to 2. Bundesliga and qualification for DFB-Pokal
3	Rot-Weiss Essen	38	20	10	8	78	66	+12	70	Qualification for promotion play-offs and DFB-Pokal
4	MSV Duisburg	38	19	11	8	66	49	+17	68	Qualification for DFB-Pokal
5	Hansa Rostock	38	18	13	7	74	49	+25	67	
6	SC Verl	38	18	10	10	82	48	+34	64	

Source: DFB
Rules for classification: 1) Points; 2) Goal difference; 3) Goals scored; 4) Head-to-head results; 5) Head-to-head away goals scored; 6) Away goals scored; 7) Play-off.
(P) Promoted

==== Results summary ====
Overall								Home						Away					
Pld	W	D	L	GF	GA	GD	Pts	W	D	L	GF	GA	GD	W	D	L	GF	GA	GD
38	19	11	8	66	49	+17	68	14	5	0	40	19	+21	5	6	8	26	30	−4

Last updated: 16 May 2026.
Source: DFB

==== Results by round ====
Round	1	2	3	4	5	6	7	8	9	10	11	12	13	14	15	16	17	18	19	20	21	22	23	24	25	26	27	28	29	30	31	32	33	34	35	36	37	38
Ground	H	A	H	A	H	A	A	H	A	H	A	H	A	H	A	H	A	H	A	A	H	A	H	A	H	H	A	H	A	H	A	H	A	H	A	H	A	H
Result	W	W	W	W	W	W	D	W	D	D	L	D	D	W	L	W	L	D	D	W	W	L	W	L	W	D	D	W	L	W	L	W	W	W	L	W	D	D
Position	3	1	1	1	1	1	1	1	1	1	1	2	1	1	2	1	2	2	3	2	1	3	2	3	2	3	3	3	5	4	5	4	4	4	4	3	3	4

Source: DFB
A = Away; H = Home; W = Win; D = Draw; L = Loss

==== Matches ====
2 August 2025 1	MSV Duisburg	2–1	VfB Stuttgart II	Duisburg
16:30	Sussek 51'; Herwerth 74' (o.g.)	Report	Nothnagel 65'	Stadium: Schauinsland-Reisen-Arena; Attendance: 19,652; Referee: Felix Wagner

10 August 2025 2	Jahn Regensburg	0–4	MSV Duisburg	Regensburg
13:30	Kühlwetter 11'	Report	Sussek 8', 67'; Symalla 23'; Töpken 63'	Stadium: Jahnstadion Regensburg; Attendance: 9,514; Referee: Daniel Bartnitzki

23 August 2025 3	MSV Duisburg	2–1	SSV Ulm	Duisburg
16:30	Hahn 23'; Töpken 90+3'	Report	Löder 75'	Stadium: Schauinsland-Reisen-Arena; Attendance: 19,038; Referee: Koki Nagamine

30 August 2025 4	SC Verl	2–3	MSV Duisburg	Verl
14:00	Taz 20'; Gayret 77'	Report	Symalla 81'; Töpken 84'; Noß 90+2'	Stadium: Sportclub Arena; Attendance: 3,810; Referee: Sebastian Hilsberg

13 September 2025 5	MSV Duisburg	3–1	Wehen Wiesbaden	Duisburg
14:00	Viet 28'; Coşkun 30'; Noß 71'	Report	Agrafiotis 49'	Stadium: Schauinsland-Reisen-Arena; Attendance: 20,076; Referee: Justin Hasmann

16 September 2025 6	1. FC Schweinfurt	0–3	MSV Duisburg	Schweinfurt
19:00		Report	Bulić 5'; Fleckstein 61'; Coşkun 74'	Stadium: Sachs-Stadion; Attendance: 5,151; Referee: Felix Grund

21 September 2025 7	TSV Havelse	1–1	MSV Duisburg	Hanover
13:30	Posselt 90+7'	Report	Noß 90'	Stadium: Eilenriedestadion; Attendance: 3,012; Referee: Ben Uhrig

27 September 2025 8	MSV Duisburg	2–1	FC Ingolstadt	Duisburg
14:00	Sussek 77'; Hahn 84'	Report	Sekulovic 72'	Stadium: Schauinsland-Reisen-Arena; Attendance: 20,170; Referee: Felix Bickel

30 September 2025 9	1. FC Saarbrücken	0–0	MSV Duisburg	Saarbrücken
19:00		Report		Stadium: Ludwigsparkstadion; Attendance: 14,601; Referee: Nico Fuchs

3 October 2025 10	MSV Duisburg	2–2	Hansa Rostock	Duisburg
19:00	Sussek 32'; Fleckstein 71'	Report	Harenbrock 45+1', 76'	Stadium: Schauinsland-Reisen-Arena; Attendance: 27,207; Referee: Patrick Schwengers

19 October 2025 11	1860 Munich	3–1	MSV Duisburg	Munich
16:30	Haugen 41', 78'; Jacobsen 90+4'	Report	Bitter 42'	Stadium: Grünwalder Stadion; Attendance: 15,000; Referee: Martin Wilke

26 October 2025 12	MSV Duisburg	1–1	Rot-Weiss Essen	Duisburg
19:30	Krüger 23'	Report	Safi 25'	Stadium: Schauinsland-Reisen-Arena; Attendance: 27,719; Referee: Richard Hempel

1 November 2025 13	VfL Osnabrück	0–0	MSV Duisburg	Osnabrück
14:00		Report		Stadium: Stadion an der Bremer Brücke; Attendance: 15,741; Referee: Timo Gansloweit

7 November 2025 14	MSV Duisburg	2–1	Waldhof Mannheim	Duisburg
19:30	Noß 20'; Bitter 69'	Report	Boyd 85'	Stadium: Schauinsland-Reisen-Arena; Attendance: 22,241; Referee: Cristian Ballweg

21 November 2025 15	TSG Hoffenheim II	4–1	MSV Duisburg	Sinsheim
19:00	Hennrich 6'; Mokwa 36', 45'; Echghouyab 42'	Report	Noß 72'	Stadium: Dietmar-Hopp-Stadion; Attendance: 1,769; Referee: Niclas Rose

29 November 2025 16	MSV Duisburg	3–1	Alemannia Aachen	Duisburg
14:00	Noß 7'; Meuer 33'; Coşkun 41'	Report	Ademi 80'	Stadium: Schauinsland-Reisen-Arena; Attendance: 28,119; Referee: Konrad Oldhafer

6 December 2025 17	Energie Cottbus	3–2	MSV Duisburg	Cottbus
14:00	Engelhardt 11'; Biankadi 47'; Ciğerci 90+5'	Report	Straudi 80' (o.g.); Dittgen 89'	Stadium: LEAG Energie Stadion; Attendance: 13,144; Referee: Tom Bauer

13 December 2025 18	MSV Duisburg	0–0	Erzgebirge Aue	Duisburg
14:00		Report		Stadium: Schauinsland-Reisen-Arena; Attendance: 18,508; Referee: Felix Wagner

21 December 2025 19	Viktoria Köln	0–0	MSV Duisburg	Cologne
19:30		Report		Stadium: Sportpark Höhenberg; Attendance: 7,943; Referee: Michael Näther

18 January 2026 20	VfB Stuttgart II	0–4	MSV Duisburg	Aspach
13:30		Report	Sussek 53'; Lobinger 72'; Bitter 90'; Tugbenyo 90+5'	Stadium: WIRmachenDRUCK Arena; Attendance: 1,900; Referee: Kevin Behrens

24 January 2026 21	MSV Duisburg	2–0	Jahn Regensburg	Duisburg
16:30	Bitter 27'; Lobinger 52'	Report		Stadium: Schauinsland-Reisen-Arena; Attendance: 20,102; Referee: Lennart Kernchen

1 February 2026 22	SSV Ulm	1–0	MSV Duisburg	Ulm
13:30	El-Zein 27'	Report		Stadium: Donaustadion; Attendance: 9,063; Referee: Sebastian Hilsberg

8 February 2026 23	MSV Duisburg	4–2	SC Verl	Duisburg
19:30	Lobinger 2', 45+3'; Borkowski 35'; Sussek 47'	Report	Mhamdi 4'; Stark 74'	Stadium: Schauinsland-Reisen-Arena; Attendance: 20,327; Referee: Jarno Wienefeld

14 February 2026 24	Wehen Wiesbaden	6–1	MSV Duisburg	Wiesbaden
14:00	Kaya 3', 45+2', 47', 63'; Flotho 26'; Schleimer 68'	Report	Krüger 46'	Stadium: BRITA-Arena; Attendance: 6,127; Referee: Timon Schulz

21 February 2026 25	MSV Duisburg	3–1	1. FC Schweinfurt	Duisburg
14:00	Noß 4'; Casar 21'; Coşkun 39'	Report	Osawe 77'	Stadium: Schauinsland-Reisen-Arena; Attendance: 18,684; Referee: Leonidas Exuzidis

1 March 2026 26	MSV Duisburg	1–1	TSV Havelse	Duisburg
16:30	Fleckstein 66'	Report	Rexhepi 20'	Stadium: Schauinsland-Reisen-Arena; Attendance: 19,106; Referee: Niclas Rose

4 March 2026 27	FC Ingolstadt	0–0	MSV Duisburg	Ingolstadt
19:00		Report		Stadium: Audi Sportpark; Attendance: 3,944; Referee: Felix Weller

8 March 2026 28	MSV Duisburg	4–2	1. FC Saarbrücken	Duisburg
16:30	Lobinger 23'; Noß 58', 64'; Symalla 84'	Report	Fleckstein 42' (o.g.); Multhaup 49'	Stadium: Schauinsland-Reisen-Arena; Attendance: 18,593; Referee: Cengiz Kabalakli

14 March 2026 29	Hansa Rostock	5–1	MSV Duisburg	Rostock
14:00	Holten 2', 21', 43'; Dietze 34'; Harenbrock 75'	Report	Meuer 22'	Stadium: Ostseestadion; Attendance: 25,957; Referee: Cristian Ballweg

22 March 2026 30	MSV Duisburg	2–1	1860 Munich	Duisburg
16:30	Bitter 60'; Töpken 90'	Report	Jacobsen 69' (pen.)	Stadium: Schauinsland-Reisen-Arena; Attendance: 24,394; Referee: Richard Hempel

4 April 2026 31	Rot-Weiss Essen	1–0	MSV Duisburg	Essen
16:30	Mizuta 43'	Report		Stadium: Stadion an der Hafenstraße; Attendance: 20,100; Referee: Sören Storks

7 April 2026 32	MSV Duisburg	1–0	VfL Osnabrück	Duisburg
19:00	Krüger 30'	Report		Stadium: Schauinsland-Reisen-Arena; Attendance: 24,322; Referee: Nico Fuchs

11 April 2026 33	Waldhof Mannheim	1–4	MSV Duisburg	Mannheim
14:00	Lohkemper 61'	Report	Kother 8', 41'; Lobinger 48'; Töpken 81'	Stadium: Carl-Benz-Stadion; Attendance: 13,511; Referee: Konrad Oldhafer

18 April 2026 34	MSV Duisburg	3–1	TSG Hoffenheim II	Duisburg
14:00	Lobinger 17', 50'; Noß 90+3'	Report	Lührs 40'	Stadium: Schauinsland-Reisen-Arena; Attendance: 27,524; Referee: Assad Nouhoum

24 April 2026 35	Alemannia Aachen	3–1	MSV Duisburg	Aachen
19:00	Schroers 32'; Loune 36'; Bitter 86' (o.g.)	Report	Casar 79'	Stadium: Tivoli; Attendance: 30,894; Referee: Lukas Benen

3 May 2026 36	MSV Duisburg	2–1	Energie Cottbus	Duisburg
13:30	Töpken 32'; Kother 56'	Report	Engelhardt 90+1'	Stadium: Schauinsland-Reisen-Arena; Attendance: 30,107; Referee: Robert Kampka

8 May 2026 37	Erzgebirge Aue	0–0	MSV Duisburg	Aue
19:00		Report		Stadium: Erzgebirgsstadion; Attendance: 10,334; Referee: Kevin Behrens

16 May 2026 38	MSV Duisburg	1–1	Viktoria Köln	Duisburg
13:30	Bitter 76'	Report	Duman 50'	Stadium: Schauinsland-Reisen-Arena; Attendance: 30,343; Referee: Martin Petersen

=== Lower Rhine Cup ===
20 August 2025 Round 1	Victoria Mennrath	0–7	MSV Duisburg	Mönchengladbach
19:30		Report	Töpken 15', 19'; Borkowski 37'; Noß 45+1', 57'; Heike 80'; Sadlek 85'	Stadium: Grenzlandstadion; Attendance: 2,000; Referee: Felix May

10 September 2025 Round 2	Union Nettetal	1–2 (a.e.t.)	MSV Duisburg	Nettetal
19:30	Gergorec 61'	Report	Töpken 58' (pen.), 109'	Stadium: Hauptplatz Lobbericherstr. Attendance: 1,500; Referee: Ramon Falke

15 October 2025 Round 3	KFC Uerdingen	1–3	MSV Duisburg	Krefeld
19:30	Kaya 85'	Report	Bitter 16'; Viet 20' (pen.); Töpken 43'	Stadium: Grotenburg-Stadion; Attendance: 9,341; Referee: Davide Zeisberg

16 November 2025 Quarterfinals	SV Sonsbeck	0–3	MSV Duisburg	Sonsbeck
13:30		Report	Krüger 41'; Noß 45'; Sussek 53' (pen.)	Stadium: Willy-Lemkens-Sportpark; Attendance: 3,000; Referee: Kristijan Rajkovski

28 March 2026 Semifinals	1. FC Bocholt	0–2	MSV Duisburg	Bocholt
15:00		Report	Jessen 104', 120'	Stadium: Stadion am Hünting; Attendance: 3,376; Referee: Thibaut Scheer

23 May 2026 Final	SC St. Tönis	1–4	MSV Duisburg	Duisburg
15:30	Montenegro 87'	Report	Sussek 4', 47'; Casar 34' (pen.); Symalla 51'	Stadium: Schauinsland-Reisen-Arena; Attendance: 18,972; Referee: Jan Weßels

== Statistics ==
=== Squad statistics ===
No.	Pos	Nat	Player	Total		3. Liga		Lower Rhine Cup	
No.	Pos	Nat	Player	Apps	Goals	Apps	Goals	Apps	Goals
1	GK	(Germany) GER	Maximilian Braune	42	0	38	0	4	0
4	DF	(Germany) GER	Dominik Becker	1	0	1	0	0	0
5	DF	(Germany) GER	Tobias Fleckstein	43	3	37	3	6	0
6	MF	(Germany) GER	Rasim Bulić	33	1	31	1	2	0
7	MF	(Germany) GER	Jakob Bookjans	5	0	4	0	1	0
8	MF	(Slovenia) SLO	Aljaž Casar	17	3	15	2	2	1
9	FW	(Germany) GER	Tim Heike	13	0	13	0	0	0
10	MF	(Germany) GER	Christian Viet	33	2	30	1	3	1
11	MF	(Germany) GER	Maximilian Dittgen	16	1	12	1	4	0
13	GK	(Israel) ISR	Omer Hanin	1	0	0	0	1	0
14	MF	(Republic of Ireland) IRL	Conor Noß	44	12	38	10	6	2
17	DF	(Germany) GER	Mert Göckan	29	0	24	0	5	0
18	FW	(Germany) GER	Steffen Meuer	30	2	25	2	5	0
19	MF	(Germany) GER	Leon Müller	18	0	14	0	4	0
20	DF	(Germany) GER	Niklas Jessen	28	2	22	0	6	2
21	GK	(Germany) GER	Laurenz Jennissen	0	0	0	0	0	0
22	FW	(Germany) GER	Thilo Töpken	29	11	23	6	6	5
23	MF	(Germany) GER	Jan-Simon Symalla	29	4	24	3	5	1
24	GK	(Germany) GER	Julius Paris	1	0	0	0	1	0
25	FW	(Germany) GER	Dennis Borkowski	7	3	6	1	1	2
26	FW	(Germany) GER	Florian Krüger	32	4	28	3	4	1
27	DF	(Germany) GER	Can Coşkun	41	4	37	4	4	0
28	MF	(Germany) GER	Florian Egerer	3	0	1	0	2	0
29	DF	(Germany) GER	Joshua Bitter	38	6	36	5	2	1
31	DF	(Germany) GER	Dominik Kother	15	3	14	3	1	0
33	MF	(Germany) GER	Jesse Tugbenyo	26	1	22	1	4	0
37	MF	(Germany) GER	Patrick Sussek	39	10	35	7	4	3
38	MF	(Germany) GER	Gabriel Sadlek	4	0	1	0	3	0
40	DF	(Germany) GER	Ben Schlicke	18	0	14	0	4	0
42	DF	(Germany) GER	Alexander Hahn	30	2	30	2	0	0
45	FW	(Germany) GER	Lex-Tyger Lobinger	19	8	18	8	1	0
	MF	(Germany) GER	Jonas Michelbrink†	0	0	0	0	0	0
	DF	(Germany) GER	Moritz Montag†	0	0	0	0	0	0
	FW	(Germany) GER	Andy Visser†	5	0	4	0	1	0
	FW	(Germany) GER	Jannik Zahmel†	1	0	0	0	1	0

Last updated: 23 May 2026
Source: FBREF

^{†} Player left Duisburg during the season.

=== Goals ===
Rank	Player	3. Liga	LR Cup	Total
1	(Republic of Ireland) Conor Noß	10	2	12
2	(Germany) Thilo Töpken	6	5	11
3	(Germany) Patrick Sussek	7	3	10
4	(Germany) Lex-Tyger Lobinger	8	0	8
5	(Germany) Joshua Bitter	5	1	7
6	(Germany) Can Coşkun	4	0	4
6	(Germany) Florian Krüger	3	1	4
6	(Germany) Jan-Simon Symalla	3	1	4
9	(Germany) Dennis Borkowski	1	2	3
9	(Slovenia) Aljaž Casar	2	1	3
9	(Germany) Tobias Fleckstein	2	1	3
9	(Germany) Dominik Kother	3	0	3
13	(Germany) Alexander Hahn	2	0	2
13	(Germany) Niklas Jessen	0	2	2
13	(Germany) Steffen Meuer	2	0	2
13	(Germany) Christian Viet	1	1	2
17	(Germany) Rasim Bulić	1	0	1
17	(Germany) Maximilian Dittgen	1	0	1
17	(Germany) Tim Heike	0	1	1
17	(Germany) Gabriel Sadlek	0	1	1
17	(Germany) Jesse Tugbenyo	1	0	1
Own goals		2	0	2
Total		65	21	86

=== Clean sheets ===
Rank	Player	3. Liga	LR Cup	Total
1	(Germany) Maximilian Braune	11	2	13
2	(Germany) Julius Paris	0	1	1
3	(Israel) Omer Hanin	0	0	0
Total		11	3	14

=== Disciplinary record ===
N	P	Nat.	Name	3. Liga			LR Cup			Total			Notes
N	P	Nat.	Name	Yellow card	Second yellow card	Red card	Yellow card	Second yellow card	Red card	Yellow card	Second yellow card	Red card	Notes
8	MF	(Germany)	Aljaž Casar	1		1				1		1	
25	MF	(Germany)	Dennis Borkowski	1	1					1	1		
6	MF	(Germany)	Rasim Bulić	10						10			
27	DF	(Germany)	Can Coşkun	9						9			
18	MF	(Germany)	Steffen Meuer	6			2			8			
29	DF	(Germany)	Joshua Bitter	7						7			
42	DF	(Germany)	Alexander Hahn	6						6			
1	GK	(Germany)	Maximilian Braune	4			1			5			
5	DF	(Germany)	Tobias Fleckstein	5						5			
33	MF	(Germany)	Jesse Tugbenyo	4			1			5			
37	MF	(Germany)	Patrick Sussek	5						5			
23	MF	(Germany)	Jan-Simon Symalla	2			1			3			
40	DF	(Germany)	Ben Schlicke	3						3			
45	FW	(Germany)	Lex-Tyger Lobinger	2			1			3			
10	MF	(Germany)	Christian Viet	2						2			
14	MF	(Germany)	Conor Noß	2						2			
22	FW	(Germany)	Thilo Töpken	2						2			
26	FW	(Germany)	Florian Krüger	2						2			
4	DF	(Germany)	Dominik Becker	1						1			
7	MF	(Germany)	Jakob Bookjans	1						1			
19	MF	(Germany)	Leon Müller	1						1			
24	GK	(Germany)	Julius Paris	1						1			
28	MF	(Germany)	Florian Egerer	1						1			
30	FW	(Netherlands)	Andy Visser				1			1			
31	MF	(Germany)	Dominik Kother	1						1			

Last updated: 23 May 2026
Source: FBREF
Only competitive matches
(yellow card) = Number of bookings; (second yellow card) = Number of sending offs after a second yellow card; (red card) = Number of sending offs by a direct red card.
