= Alexander Hahn (footballer) =

German footballer

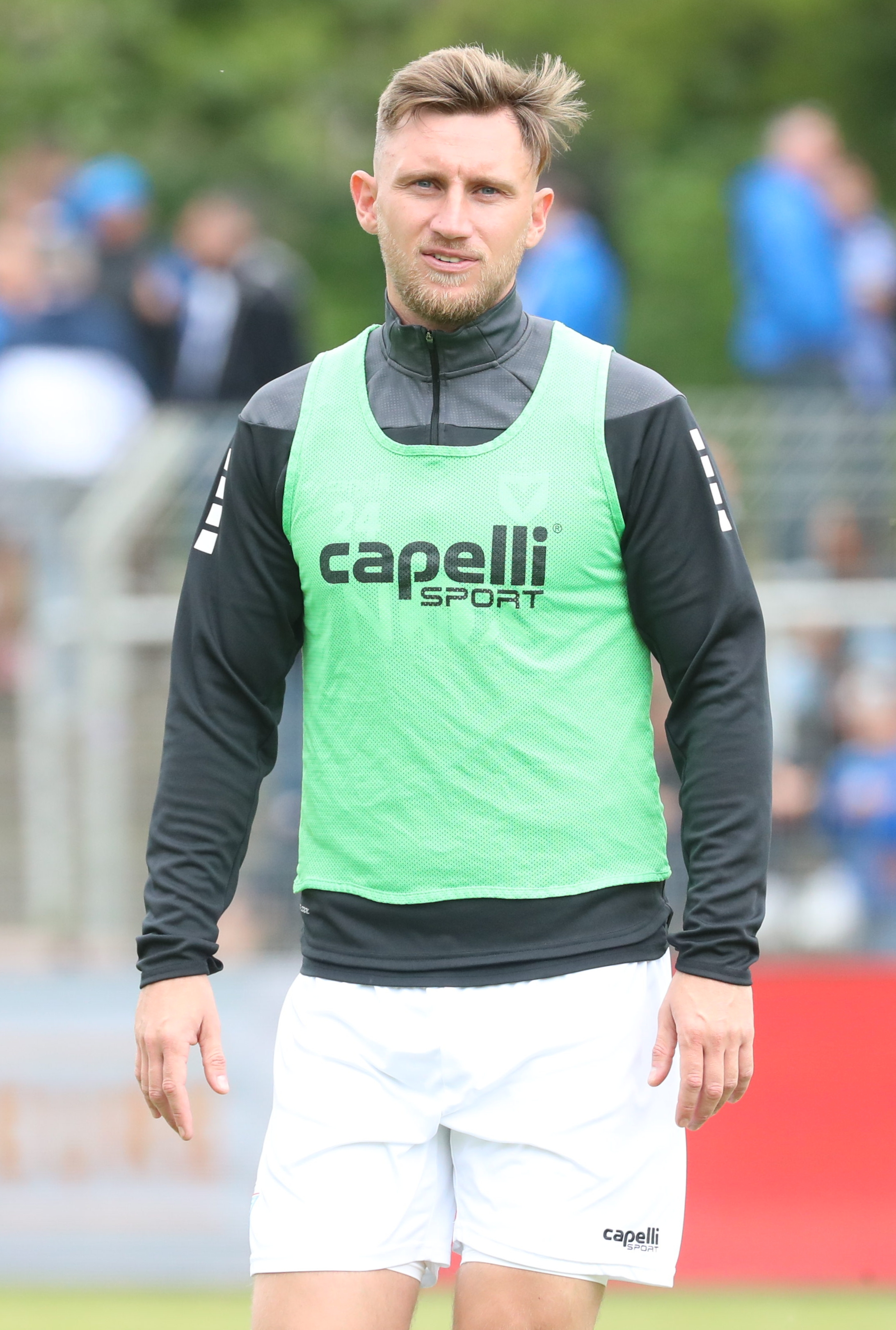
- Hahn in 2022

Personal information
- Date of birth: 20 January 1993 (age 33)
- Place of birth: Omsk, Russia
- Height: 1.87 m (6 ft 2 in)
- Position: Centre-back

Team information
- Current team: 1. FC Bocholt
- Number: 24

Youth career
- 1999–2002: SV Veldhausen
- 2002–2007: VfL Weiße Elf Nordhorn 1919
- 2007–2011: Werder Bremen

Senior career*
Years	Team	Apps	(Gls)
2011–2013	Werder Bremen II	39	(2)
2013–2014	SV Meppen	34	(3)
2014–2017	1. FC Saarbrücken	71	(6)
2017–2019	FC Homburg	65	(21)
2019–2021	Rot-Weiss Essen	54	(4)
2021–2022	Viktoria Berlin	15	(0)
2022–2024	Preußen Münster	52	(4)
2024–2026	MSV Duisburg	62	(7)
2026–	1. FC Bocholt	3	(0)

International career
2008–2009	Germany U16	8	(0)
2009	Germany U17	3	(1)
- * Club domestic league appearances and goals as of 23 September 2026

Alexander Hahn (born 20 January 1993) is a German professional footballer who plays as a centre-back for 1. FC Bocholt.

== Career ==
After playing several years in the 3. Liga and Regionalliga he was promoted with Preußen Münster to the 2. Bundesliga in 2024. After that, he moved to MSV Duisburg of the Regionalliga for the 2024–25 season. In December 2025, he signed a new contract that keeps him at Duisburg. He joined 1. FC Bocholt in September 2026.

== Career statistics ==
As of 8 May 2026

Appearances and goals by club, season and competition
Club	Season	League			Cup		Other		Total	
Club	Season	Division	Apps	Goals	Apps	Goals	Apps	Goals	Apps	Goals
Werder Bremen II	2011–12	3. Liga	23	1	—		—		23	1
Werder Bremen II	2012–13	Regionalliga Nord	16	1	—		—		16	1
Werder Bremen II	Total		39	2	—		—		39	2
SV Meppen	2013–14	Regionalliga Nord	34	3	—		—		34	3
1. FC Saarbrücken	2014–15	Regionalliga Südwest	32	5	—		2 (Note: Two matches in the promotion round)	0	32	5
1. FC Saarbrücken	2015–16	Regionalliga Südwest	24	0	—		—		24	0
1. FC Saarbrücken	2016–17	Regionalliga Südwest	15	1	—		—		15	1
1. FC Saarbrücken	Total		71	6	—		2	0	72	6
FC Homburg	2017–18	Oberliga Rheinland-Pfalz/Saar	33	9	—		—		33	9
FC Homburg	2018–19	Regionalliga Südwest	32	12	—		—		32	12
FC Homburg	Total		65	21	—		—		65	21
Rot-Weiss Essen	2019–20	Regionalliga West	24	4	—		—		24	4
Rot-Weiss Essen	2020–21	Regionalliga West	30	0	4	0	—		34	0
Rot-Weiss Essen	Total		54	4	4	0	—		58	4
Viktoria Berlin	2021–22	3. Liga	15	0	—		—		15	0
Preußen Münster	2022–23	Regionalliga West	32	3	—		—		33	3
Preußen Münster	2023–24	3. Liga	20	1	1	0	—		20	1
Preußen Münster	Total		52	4	1	0	—		53	4
MSV Duisburg	2024–25	Regionalliga West	32	5	—		—		32	5
MSV Duisburg	2025–26	3. Liga	30	2	—		—		30	2
MSV Duisburg	2026–27	3. Liga	0	0	0	0	—		0	0
MSV Duisburg	Total		62	7	0	0	—		62	7
Career total			392	47	5	0	2	0	399	47
