= Björn Schlicke =

German footballer

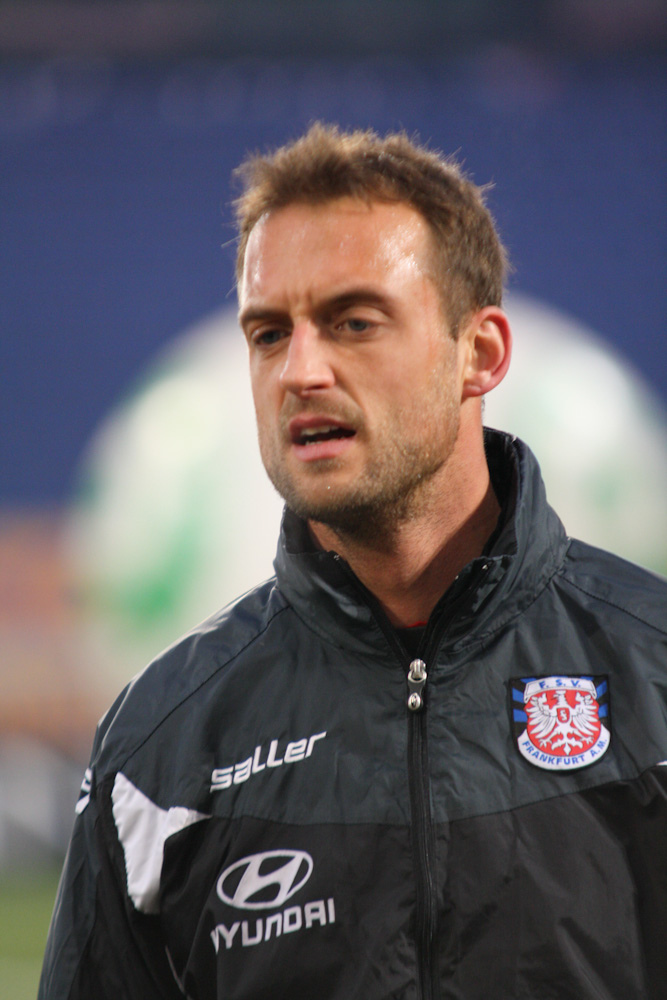
- Schlicke with FSV Frankfurt in 2012

Personal information
- Date of birth: 23 June 1981 (age 45)
- Place of birth: Erlangen, West Germany
- Height: 1.94 m (6 ft 4 in)
- Position: Centre-back

Youth career
- 1987–1993: ATSV Erlangen
- 1993–1994: FSV Erlangen-Bruck
- 1994–2000: 1. FC Nürnberg

Senior career*
Years	Team	Apps	(Gls)
2000–2003	Greuther Fürth	43	(2)
2003–2005	Hamburger SV II	3	(0)
2003–2005	Hamburger SV	46	(2)
2005–2006	1. FC Köln	15	(3)
2005–2006	1. FC Köln II	3	(0)
2006–2010	MSV Duisburg	113	(6)
2010–2017	FSV Frankfurt	123	(6)
2017	Greuther Fürth II	25	(0)
Total		371	(19)

International career
	Germany U15	8	(0)
2002–2004	Germany U21	13	(0)
2003–2004	Germany B	3	(0)
- * Club domestic league appearances and goals

Björn Schlicke (born 23 June 1981) is a German former professional footballer who played as a centre-back. He began his career at Greuther Fürth and had spells at Hamburger SV, 1. FC Köln and MSV Duisburg, and FSV Frankfurt before returning to Greuther Fürth to play for the club's reserves.

His son Ben is also a professionall footballer.

== Honours ==
Hamburger SV

- DFL-Ligapokal: 2003
