= Dennis Borkowski =

German footballer (born 2002)

Personal information
- Date of birth: 26 January 2002 (age 24)
- Place of birth: Riesa, Germany
- Height: 1.84 m (6 ft 0 in)
- Position: Forward

Team information
- Current team: MSV Duisburg
- Number: 25

Senior career*
| Years | Team | Apps | (Gls) |
| 2020–2024 | RB Leipzig | 3 | (0) |
| 2021–2022 | → 1. FC Nürnberg (loan) | 23 | (3) |
| 2021–2022 | → 1. FC Nürnberg II (loan) | 4 | (0) |
| 2022–2024 | → Dynamo Dresden (loan) | 59 | (10) |
| 2024–2025 | FC Ingolstadt | 27 | (1) |
| 2025– | MSV Duisburg | 7 | (1) |
- * Club domestic league appearances and goals as of 13:37, 21 September 2026 (UTC)

Dennis Borkowski (born 26 January 2002) is a German professional footballer who plays as a forward for 3. Liga club MSV Duisburg.

== Career ==
On 23 June 2022, Borkowski joined Dynamo Dresden on a season-long loan. The loan was extended for the 2023–24 season.

On 7 June 2024, Borkowski signed with FC Ingolstadt 04.

In June 2025, he signed with MSV Duisburg.

== Career statistics ==
As of 20 September 2026

Appearances and goals by club, season and competition
| Club | Season | League | | | National cup | | Other | | Total | |
| Club | Season | Division | Apps | Goals | Apps | Goals | Apps | Goals | Apps | Goals |
|---|---|---|---|---|---|---|---|---|---|---|
| RB Leipzig | 2019–20 | Bundesliga | 1 | 0 | 0 | 0 | — | | 1 | 0 |
| RB Leipzig | 2020–21 | Bundesliga | 2 | 0 | 1 | 0 | — | | 2 | 0 |
| RB Leipzig | Total | | 3 | 0 | 1 | 0 | — | | 3 | 0 |
| 1. FC Nürnberg (loan) | 2020–21 | 2. Bundesliga | 13 | 3 | 0 | 0 | — | | 13 | 3 |
| 1. FC Nürnberg (loan) | 2021–22 | 2. Bundesliga | 10 | 0 | 1 | 0 | — | | 11 | 0 |
| 1. FC Nürnberg (loan) | Total | | 23 | 3 | 1 | 0 | — | | 24 | 3 |
| 1. FC Nürnberg II (loan) | 2021–22 | Regionalliga Bayern | 4 | 0 | — | | — | | 4 | 0 |
| Dynamo Dresden (loan) | 2022–23 | 2. Bundesliga | 30 | 7 | 1 | 0 | — | | 31 | 7 |
| Dynamo Dresden (loan) | 2023–24 | 2. Bundesliga | 29 | 3 | 0 | 0 | — | | 29 | 3 |
| Dynamo Dresden (loan) | Total | | 59 | 10 | 1 | 0 | — | | 60 | 10 |
| FC Ingolstadt | 2024–25 | 3. Liga | 27 | 1 | 1 | 0 | — | | 28 | 1 |
| MSV Duisburg | 2025–26 | 3. Liga | 6 | 1 | — | | — | | 6 | 1 |
| MSV Duisburg | 2026–27 | 3. Liga | 1 | 0 | 0 | 0 | — | | 1 | 0 |
| MSV Duisburg | Total | | 7 | 1 | 0 | 0 | — | | 7 | 1 |
| Career total | | | 123 | 15 | 4 | 0 | — | | 127 | 15 |
