= Christian Viet =

German footballer

Personal information
- Date of birth: 27 March 1999 (age 27)
- Place of birth: Buxtehude, Germany
- Height: 1.83 m (6 ft 0 in)
- Position: Midfielder

Team information
- Current team: MSV Duisburg
- Number: 10

Youth career
- –2016: SV Ahlerstedt/Ottendorf
- 2017–2018: FC St. Pauli

Senior career*
Years	Team	Apps	(Gls)
2017–2021	FC St. Pauli II	60	(4)
2020–2022	FC St. Pauli	10	(0)
2021–2022	→ Borussia Dortmund II (loan)	30	(0)
2022–2025	Jahn Regensburg	89	(11)
2025–	MSV Duisburg	37	(2)
- * Club domestic league appearances and goals as of 16:35, 10 October 2026 (UTC)

Christian Viet (born 27 March 1999) is a German professional footballer who plays as a midfielder for MSV Duisburg.

== Career ==
Viet made his professional debut for FC St. Pauli in the 2. Bundesliga on 5 June 2020, starting in the away match against VfL Bochum. In June 2025, he moved to MSV Duisburg.

== Career statistics ==
As of 10 October 2026

Appearances and goals by club, season and competition
Club	Season	League			Cup		Other		Total	
Club	Season	Division	Apps	Goals	Apps	Goals	Apps	Goals	Apps	Goals
FC St. Pauli II	2017–18	Regionalliga Nord	17	1	—		—		3	0
FC St. Pauli II	2018–19	Regionalliga Nord	21	0	—		—		21	0
FC St. Pauli II	2019–20	Regionalliga Nord	18	2	—		—		18	2
FC St. Pauli II	2020–21	Regionalliga Nord	4	1	—		—		4	1
FC St. Pauli II	Total		60	4	—		—		60	4
FC St. Pauli	2019–20	2. Bundesliga	4	0	0	0	—		4	0
FC St. Pauli	2020–21	2. Bundesliga	3	0	0	0	—		3	0
FC St. Pauli	2021–22	2. Bundesliga	3	0	0	0	—		3	0
FC St. Pauli	Total		10	0	0	0	—		10	0
Borussia Dortmund II	2021–22	Regionalliga West	30	0	—		—		30	0
Jahn Regensburg	2022–23	2. Bundesliga	22	0	1	0	—		23	0
Jahn Regensburg	2023–24	3. Liga	35	10	1	0	2 (Note: Appearances in promotion play-offs)	0	38	10
Jahn Regensburg	2024–25	2. Bundesliga	32	1	2	0	—		34	1
Jahn Regensburg	Total		89	11	4	0	2	0	95	11
MSV Duisburg	2025–26	3. Liga	31	1	—		—		31	1
MSV Duisburg	2026–27	3. Liga	6	1	1	0	—		7	1
MSV Duisburg	Total		37	2	1	0	—		38	2
Career total			226	17	5	0	2	0	233	17
