= Tim Heike =

German footballer

Personal information
- Date of birth: 25 February 2000 (age 26)
- Place of birth: Wolfenbüttel, Germany
- Height: 1.83 m (6 ft 0 in)
- Position: Forward

Team information
- Current team: SC Verl
- Number: 25

Youth career
- –2015: VfL Wolfsburg
- 2015–2019: Eintracht Braunschweig

Senior career*
Years	Team	Apps	(Gls)
2019–2020	MTV Wolfenbüttel	19	(11)
2020–2021	VfV Hildesheim	9	(0)
2021–2022	Germania Halberstadt	33	(11)
2022–2024	Energie Cottbus	50	(24)
2024–2025	FC Ingolstadt	26	(3)
2025–2026	MSV Duisburg	13	(0)
2026–	SC Verl	0	(0)
- * Club domestic league appearances and goals as of 17:19, 22 December 2025 (UTC)

Tim Heike (born 25 February 2000) is a German professional footballer who plays as a forward for SC Verl.

== Career ==
Heike played in the Regionalliga for a few years before moving to FC Ingolstadt in the 3. Liga in the summer of 2024. In June 2025, he moved to MSV Duisburg. After one year in Duisburg, he signed with SC Verl.

== Career statistics ==
As of 21 December 2025

Appearances and goals by club, season and competition
Club	Season	League			Cup		Other		Total	
Club	Season	Division	Apps	Goals	Apps	Goals	Apps	Goals	Apps	Goals
MTV Wolfenbüttel	2019–20	Oberliga Niedersachsen	19	11	—		—		19	11
VfV Hildesheim	2020–21	Regionalliga Nord	9	0	—		—		9	0
Germania Halberstadt	2021–22	Regionalliga Nordost	33	11	—		—		33	11
Energie Cottbus	2022–23	Regionalliga Nordost	17	3	1	1	2 (Note: Appearances in promotion play-offs)	0	20	4
Energie Cottbus	2023–24	Regionalliga Nordost	33	21	1	0	—		34	21
Energie Cottbus	Total		50	24	2	1	2	0	54	25
FC Ingolstadt	2024–25	3. Liga	26	3	—		—		26	3
MSV Duisburg	2025–26	3. Liga	13	0	—		—		13	0
Career total			150	49	2	1	2	0	154	50
