= Martin Ens =

German footballer (born 2001)

Personal information
- Date of birth: 20 December 2001 (age 24)
- Place of birth: Paderborn, Germany
- Height: 1.87 m (6 ft 2 in)
- Position: Defender

Team information
- Current team: MSV Duisburg (on loan from SC Paderborn)
- Number: 4

Youth career
- –2014: SV Heide Paderborn
- 2016–2019: SC Paderborn

Senior career*
Years	Team	Apps	(Gls)
2020–2024	SC Paderborn II	83	(13)
2024–	SC Paderborn	5	(0)
2025–2026	→ SC Verl (loan)	37	(3)
2026–	→ MSV Duisburg (loan)	8	(0)
- * Club domestic league appearances and goals as of 17:40, 7 November 2026 (UTC)

Martin Ens (born 20 December 2001) is a German professional footballer who plays as a defender for 3. Liga club MSV Duisburg, on loan from SC Paderborn.

== Career ==
Ens played for the youth team and second team of SC Paderborn, before being loaned to SC Verl in 2025 and in July 2026, to MSV Duisburg.

== Career statistics ==
As of 7 November 2026

Appearances and goals by club, season and competition
Club	Season	League			Cup		Other		Total	
Club	Season	Division	Apps	Goals	Apps	Goals	Apps	Goals	Apps	Goals
SC Paderborn II	2020–21	Oberliga Westfalen	4	0	—		—		4	0
SC Paderborn II	2021–22	Oberliga Westfalen	16	0	—		—		16	0
SC Paderborn II	2022–23	Oberliga Westfalen	22	9	—		—		22	9
SC Paderborn II	2023–24	Regionalliga West	21	2	—		—		21	2
SC Paderborn II	2024–25	Regionalliga West	20	2	—		—		20	2
SC Paderborn II	Total		83	13	—		—		83	13
SC Paderborn	2023–24	2. Bundesliga	4	0	0	0	—		4	0
SC Paderborn	2024–25	2. Bundesliga	1	0	0	0	—		1	0
SC Paderborn	Total		5	0	0	0	—		5	0
SC Verl (loan)	2025–26	3. Liga	37	3	—		—		37	3
MSV Duisburg (loan)	2026–27	3. Liga	8	0	1	0	—		9	0
Career total			133	16	1	0	—		134	16
