= Toni Stahl (footballer, born 1999) =

German footballer (born 1999)

Personal information
- Date of birth: 17 September 1999 (age 27)
- Place of birth: Cottbus, Germany
- Height: 1.94 m (6 ft 4 in)
- Position: Goalkeeper

Team information
- Current team: MSV Duisburg
- Number: 33

Youth career
- 2003–2005: SV Leuthen/Oßnig
- 2005–2011: Energie Cottbus
- 2011–2012: SG Groß Gaglow
- 2012–2015: Energie Cottbus
- 2015–2018: RB Leipzig
- 2018–2019: Fulham

Senior career*
Years	Team	Apps	(Gls)
2019–2022	Energie Cottbus	49	(0)
2022–2025	Hannover 96 II	70	(0)
2025–2026	1. FC Schweinfurt	29	(0)
2026–	MSV Duisburg	0	(0)
- * Club domestic league appearances and goals as of 14:17, 19 July 2026 (UTC)

Toni Stahl (born 17 September 1999) is a German professional footballer who plays as a goalkeeper for German 3. Liga club MSV Duisburg.

== Career ==
Stahl played for several clubs before joining MSV Duisburg in 2026.

== Career statistics ==
As of 19 July 2026

Appearances and goals by club, season and competition
Club	Season	League			Cup		Other		Total	
Club	Season	Division	Apps	Goals	Apps	Goals	Apps	Goals	Apps	Goals
Energie Cottbus	2019–20	Regionalliga Nordost	7	0	—		—		7	0
Energie Cottbus	2020–21	Regionalliga Nordost	8	0	—		—		8	0
Energie Cottbus	2021–22	Regionalliga Nordost	34	0	—		—		34	0
Energie Cottbus	Total		49	0	—		—		49	0
Hannover 96 II	2022–23	Regionalliga Nord	29	0	—		—		29	0
Hannover 96 II	2023–24	Regionalliga Nord	23	0	—		—		23	0
Hannover 96 II	2024–25	3. Liga	18	0	—		—		18	0
Hannover 96 II	Total		70	0	—		—		70	0
1. FC Schweinfurt	2025–26	3. Liga	29	0	—		—		29	0
MSV Duisburg	2026–27	3. Liga	0	0	0	0	—		0	0
Career total			148	0	0	0	—		148	0
