= Lex-Tyger Lobinger =

German footballer

Personal information
- Date of birth: 22 February 1999 (age 27)
- Place of birth: Bonn, Germany
- Height: 1.92 m (6 ft 4 in)
- Position: Centre-forward

Team information
- Current team: MSV Duisburg
- Number: 9

Youth career
- –2015: SSV Markranstädt
- 2015–2016: 1860 Munich
- 2017–2018: SV Rot-Weiß Merl

Senior career*
| Years | Team | Apps | (Gls) |
| 2018–2019 | SG Wattenscheid | 26 | (3) |
| 2019–2022 | Fortuna Düsseldorf II | 63 | (20) |
| 2021–2022 | Fortuna Düsseldorf | 11 | (0) |
| 2022–2024 | 1. FC Kaiserslautern | 35 | (2) |
| 2024 | → VfL Osnabrück (loan) | 14 | (0) |
| 2024–2026 | Viktoria Köln | 54 | (24) |
| 2026– | MSV Duisburg | 28 | (15) |
- * Club domestic league appearances and goals as of 17:42, 7 November 2026 (UTC)

Lex-Tyger Lobinger (born 22 February 1999) is a German professional footballer who plays as a centre-forward for 3. Liga club MSV Duisburg.

== Career ==
Lobinger made his professional debut for Fortuna Düsseldorf in the 2. Bundesliga on 8 May 2021, coming on as a substitute in the 88th minute for Shinta Appelkamp. The home match finished as a 2–2 draw.

On 1 July 2022, Lobinger signed with 1. FC Kaiserslautern.

On 5 January 2024, Lobinger joined VfL Osnabrück on loan.

On 25 June 2024, Lobinger signed for 3. Liga side Viktoria Köln. In January 2026, he moved to MSV Duisburg.

== Career statistics ==
As of 7 November 2026

Appearances and goals by club, season and competition
| Club | Season | League | | | National cup | | Other | | Total | |
| Club | Season | Division | Apps | Goals | Apps | Goals | Apps | Goals | Apps | Goals |
|---|---|---|---|---|---|---|---|---|---|---|
| SG Wattenscheid | 2018–19 | Regionalliga West | 26 | 3 | — | | — | | 26 | 3 |
| Fortuna Düsseldorf II | 2019–20 | Regionalliga West | 18 | 0 | — | | — | | 18 | 0 |
| Fortuna Düsseldorf II | 2020–21 | Regionalliga West | 29 | 11 | — | | — | | 29 | 11 |
| Fortuna Düsseldorf II | 2021–22 | Regionalliga West | 16 | 9 | — | | — | | 16 | 9 |
| Fortuna Düsseldorf II | Total | | 63 | 20 | — | | — | | 63 | 20 |
| Fortuna Düsseldorf | 2020–21 | 2. Bundesliga | 1 | 0 | 0 | 0 | — | | 1 | 0 |
| Fortuna Düsseldorf | 2021–22 | 2. Bundesliga | 10 | 0 | 0 | 0 | — | | 10 | 0 |
| Fortuna Düsseldorf | Total | | 11 | 0 | 0 | 0 | — | | 11 | 0 |
| 1. FC Kaiserslautern | 2022–23 | 2. Bundesliga | 29 | 2 | 1 | 0 | — | | 30 | 2 |
| 1. FC Kaiserslautern | 2023–24 | 2. Bundesliga | 6 | 0 | 1 | 0 | — | | 7 | 0 |
| 1. FC Kaiserslautern | Total | | 35 | 2 | 2 | 0 | — | | 37 | 2 |
| VfL Osnabruck (loan) | 2023–24 | 2. Bundesliga | 14 | 0 | 0 | 0 | — | | 14 | 0 |
| Viktoria Köln | 2024–25 | 3. Liga | 37 | 15 | — | | — | | 35 | 17 |
| Viktoria Köln | 2025–26 | 3. Liga | 17 | 9 | 1 | 0 | — | | 18 | 9 |
| Viktoria Köln | Total | | 54 | 24 | 1 | 0 | — | | 55 | 24 |
| MSV Duisburg | 2025–26 | 3. Liga | 18 | 8 | — | | — | | 18 | 8 |
| MSV Duisburg | 2026–27 | 3. Liga | 10 | 7 | 1 | 1 | — | | 11 | 8 |
| MSV Duisburg | Total | | 28 | 15 | 2 | 1 | — | | 29 | 16 |
| Career total | | | 231 | 64 | 4 | 1 | — | | 235 | 65 |

== Personal life ==
Lobinger is the son of pole vaulter Tim Lobinger (1972–2023) and triple jumper Petra Lobinger née Laux, who both represented Germany at the Summer Olympic Games.
