= Frederik Ørsøe Christensen =

Danish footballer (born 2002)

Personal information
- Full name: Frederik Ørsøe Christensen
- Date of birth: 7 June 2002 (age 24)
- Place of birth: Ikast, Denmark
- Height: 1.80 m (5 ft 11 in)
- Position: Midfielder

Team information
- Current team: MSV Duisburg
- Number: 3

Youth career
- Ikast KFUM
- Ikast FS
- Midtjylland

Senior career*
Years	Team	Apps	(Gls)
2021–2022	Viborg	1	(0)
2022–2023	Fredericia	46	(1)
2024–2026	Brommapojkarna	32	(2)
2025–2026	→ VfL Osnabrück (loan)	31	(3)
2026–	MSV Duisburg	6	(1)

International career
2017–2018	Denmark U16	7	(0)
2018–2019	Denmark U17	14	(0)
2020	Denmark U18	1	(0)
2020	Denmark U19	1	(0)
- * Club domestic league appearances and goals as of 15:14, 31 October 2026 (UTC)

Frederik Ørsøe Christensen (born 7 June 2002) is a Danish professional footballer who plays as a midfielder for German 3. Liga club MSV Duisburg.

== Career ==
Born in Ikast, Ørsøe started his career Ikast KFUM, before joining Ikast FS and later, at the age of 13, FC Midtjylland.

After two season with the U-19 team of Midtjylland, Christensen signed a one-year contract with newly promoted Danish Superliga club Viborg FF on 10 June 2021. Christensen got his official debut for Viborg on 2 September 2019 in a Danish Cup game against FC Fredericia, where he played 76 minutes.

Christensen got his Danish Superliga debut on 28 November 2021 against SønderjyskE. In May 2022 Viborg confirmed, that Christensen would leave the club by the end of June 2022, as his contract had come to an end.

On 6 July 2022 it was confirmed, that Christensen had joined Danish 1st Division club FC Fredericia on a one-year deal. Christensen got his debut on 23 July 2022 against Nykøbing FC in the league.

On 3 January 2024, Christensen joined Swedish Allsvenskan club IF Brommapojkarna.

On 28 June 2025, Christensen joined German 3. Liga club VfL Osnabrück on a loan-deal until 30 June 2026. In the following summer he moved to MSV Duisburg.

== Career statistics ==
As of 31 October 2026

Appearances and goals by club, season and competition
Club	Season	League			Cup		Other		Total	
Club	Season	Division	Apps	Goals	Apps	Goals	Apps	Goals	Apps	Goals
Viborg	2021–22	Danish Superliga	1	0	1	0	—		2	0
Fredericia	2022–23	Danish 1st Division	28	1	1	0	—		29	1
Fredericia	2023–24	Danish 1st Division	18	0	5	1	—		23	1
Fredericia	Total		46	1	6	1	—		52	2
Brommapojkarna	2024	Allsvenskan	7	0	4	0	—		11	0
VfL Osnabrück (loan)	2025–26	3. Liga	31	3	—		—		31	3
MSV Duisburg	2026–27	3. Liga	6	1	0	0	—		6	1
Career total			91	5	11	1	—		102	6

== Honours ==
VfL Osnabrück

- 3. Liga: 2025–26
