= Jan-Simon Symalla =

German footballer

Personal information
- Date of birth: 23 January 2005 (age 21)
- Place of birth: Velbert, Germany
- Height: 1.76 m (5 ft 9 in)
- Position: Winger

Team information
- Current team: MSV Duisburg
- Number: 23

Youth career
- –2015: SC Velbert
- 2015–2022: Fortuna Düsseldorf
- 2022–2023: Rot-Weiß Oberhausen
- 2023–2024: MSV Duisburg

Senior career*
Years	Team	Apps	(Gls)
2025–	MSV Duisburg	59	(6)
- * Club domestic league appearances and goals as of 14:46, 12 September 2026 (UTC)

Jan-Simon Symalla (born 23 January 2005) is a German professional footballer who plays as a winger for MSV Duisburg.

== Career ==
Symalla was promoted from the youth team for MSV Duisburg in the summer of 2024.

== Personal life ==
Born in Germany, Symalla is of Polish descent.

== Career statistics ==
As of 12 September 2026

Appearances and goals by club, season and competition
Club	Season	Division	League		Cup		Other		Total	
Club	Season	Division	Apps	Goals	Apps	Goals	Apps	Goals	Apps	Goals
MSV Duisburg	2023–24	3. Liga	1	0	—		—		1	0
MSV Duisburg	2024–25	Regionalliga West	29	3	—		—		29	3
MSV Duisburg	2025–26	3. Liga	24	3	—		—		24	3
MSV Duisburg	2026–27	3. Liga	5	0	1	0	—		6	0
Career total			59	6	1	0	—		60	6
