= Leon Müller =

German footballer

Personal information
- Date of birth: 11 August 2000 (age 26)
- Place of birth: Bad Homburg, Germany
- Height: 1.80 m (5 ft 11 in)
- Position: Midfielder

Team information
- Current team: SSV Ulm
- Number: 17

Youth career
- –2016: Mainz 05
- 2016–2019: Darmstadt 98

Senior career*
Years	Team	Apps	(Gls)
2019–2022	Darmstadt 98	1	(0)
2020–2021	→ TuS Rot-Weiß Koblenz (loan)	21	(2)
2022–2023	FSV Frankfurt	33	(4)
2023–2024	Kickers Offenbach	21	(0)
2024–2026	MSV Duisburg	33	(1)
2026–	SSV Ulm	6	(0)
- * Club domestic league appearances and goals as of 24 September 2026

Leon Müller (born 11 August 2000) is a German professional footballer who plays as a midfielder for SSV Ulm.

== Career ==
Müller made his professional debut for Darmstadt 98 in the 2. Bundesliga on 28 June 2020, coming on as a substitute in the 90+1st minute for Tobias Kempe in the away match against VfB Stuttgart, which finished as a 3–1 win.

On 11 July 2022, Müller joined FSV Frankfurt in the fourth-tier Regionalliga Südwest. After two years, he signed with MSV Duisburg, starting with the 2024–25 season. He left Duisburg at the end of the 2025–26 season. He moved to SSV Ulm for the next season.

== Career statistics ==
As of 24 September 2026

Appearances and goals by club, season and competition
Club	Season	League			Cup		Total	
Club	Season	Division	Apps	Goals	Apps	Goals	Apps	Goals
Darmstadt 98	2019–20	2. Bundesliga	1	0	0	0	1	0
Rot-Weiß Koblenz	2020–21	Regionalliga Südwest	21	2	—		21	2
FSV Frankfurt	2021–22	Regionalliga Südwest	33	4	—		33	4
Kickers Offenbach	2022–23	Regionalliga Südwest	21	0	—		21	0
MSV Duisburg	2024–25	Regionalliga West	18	1	—		18	1
MSV Duisburg	2025–26	3. Liga	15	0	—		15	0
MSV Duisburg	Total		33	1	0	0	33	1
SSV Ulm	2026–27	Regionalliga Südwest	6	0	—		6	0
Career total			115	7	2	0	115	7
