= Can Coşkun =

Turkish footballer

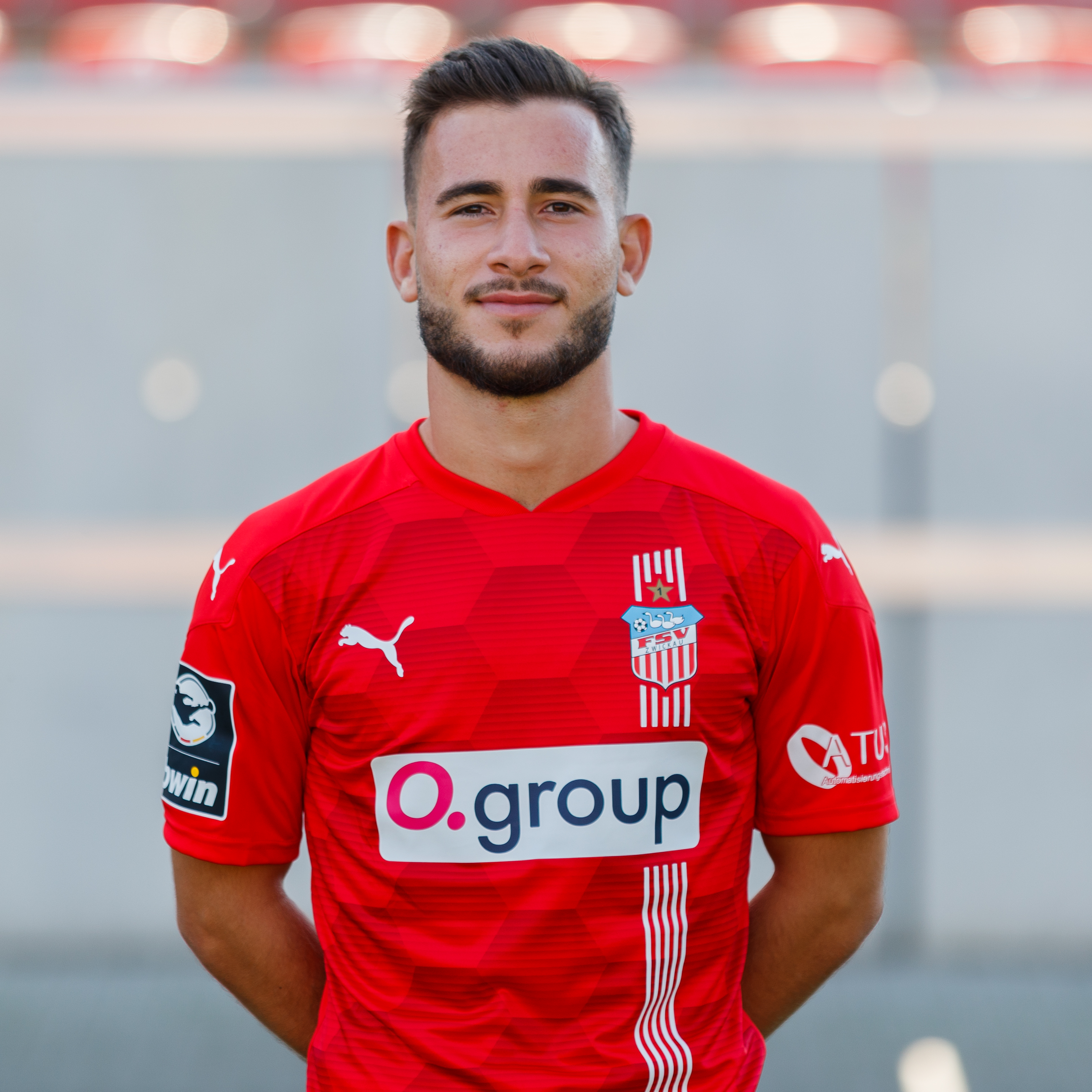
- Coşkun with FSV Zwickau in 2021

Personal information
- Date of birth: 28 March 1998 (age 28)
- Place of birth: Berlin, Germany
- Height: 1.71 m (5 ft 7 in)
- Position: Left-back

Team information
- Current team: MSV Duisburg
- Number: 27

Youth career
- –2012: Hertha BSC
- 2012–2016: Hansa Rostock
- 2016–2017: Dynamo Dresden

Senior career*
Years	Team	Apps	(Gls)
2017–2018	Berliner AK 07	26	(0)
2018–2019	Wacker Burghausen	13	(1)
2019–2020	Greuther Fürth II	32	(3)
2020–2023	FSV Zwickau	97	(1)
2023–2024	Greifswalder FC	32	(4)
2024–	MSV Duisburg	80	(4)

International career
2017	Turkey U19	2	(0)
2018	Turkey U21	2	(0)
- * Club domestic league appearances and goals as of 17:41, 7 November 2026 (UTC)

Can Coşkun (born 28 March 1998) is a professional footballer who plays as a left-back for MSV Duisburg. Born in Germany, he has represented Turkey at youth level.

== Career ==
After starting out as a youth at Hertha BSC, Hansa Rostock and Dynamo Dresden, he moved to Regionalliga Nordost club Berliner AK 07 in the summer of 2017, where he also made his first senior appearances. After one season he moved to Regionalliga Bayern club Wacker Burghausen. During the following winter break, he moved to Greuther Fürth II.

In January 2020 he moved to 3. Liga club FSV Zwickau. Here, he made his first professional appearance when he came on for Nils Miatke in the 54th minute of the game on 25 January, in a 2–1 away win against 1. FC Magdeburg.

On 11 July 2023, Coşkun moved to Regionalliga Nordost club Greifswalder FC. After one season, he was signed by MSV Duisburg. In November 2025, he extended his contract.

== Career statistics ==
As of 7 November 2026

Appearances and goals by club, season and competition
Club	Season	League			Cup		Total	
Club	Season	Division	Apps	Goals	Apps	Goals	Apps	Goals
Berliner AK 07	2016–17	Regionalliga Nordost	26	0	—		26	0
Wacker Burghausen	2017–18	Regionalliga Bayern	13	1	—		13	1
Greuther Fürth II	2016–17	Regionalliga Bayern	11	0	—		11	0
Greuther Fürth II	2019–20	Regionalliga Bayern	21	3	—		21	3
Greuther Fürth II	Total		32	3	—		32	3
FSV Zwickau	2019–20	3. Liga	13	0	—		13	0
FSV Zwickau	2020–21	3. Liga	32	0	—		32	0
FSV Zwickau	2021–22	3. Liga	28	1	—		28	1
FSV Zwickau	2022–23	3. Liga	24	0	—		24	0
FSV Zwickau	Total		97	1	—		97	1
Greifswalder FC	2023–24	Regionalliga Nordost	32	4	—		32	4
MSV Duisburg	2024–25	Regionalliga West	30	0	—		30	0
MSV Duisburg	2025–26	3. Liga	37	4	—		37	4
MSV Duisburg	2026–27	3. Liga	13	0	1	0	14	0
MSV Duisburg	Total		80	4	1	0	81	4
Career total			280	13	1	0	281	13
