= Jakob Bookjans =

German footballer (born 2000)

Personal information
- Date of birth: 21 July 2000 (age 26)
- Place of birth: Friesoythe, Germany
- Height: 1.78 m (5 ft 10 in)
- Position: Midfielder

Team information
- Current team: MSV Duisburg
- Number: 7

Youth career
- –2016: SV Hansa Friesoythe
- 2017–2018: SV Meppen
- 2018: JFV Nordwest

College career
Years	Team	Apps	(Gls)
2021	Loyola Ramblers		

Senior career*
Years	Team	Apps	(Gls)
2019–2021	VfB Oldenburg	6	(0)
2022–2023	VfB Oldenburg	29	(0)
2023–2024	Eintracht Frankfurt II	29	(9)
2024–	MSV Duisburg	36	(10)
- * Club domestic league appearances and goals as of 21:56, 15 September 2026 (UTC)

Jakob Bookjans (born 21 July 2000) is a German professional footballer who plays as a midfielder for German 3. Liga club MSV Duisburg.

== Career ==
Bookjans played for VfB Oldenburg before moving to the United States for six months, playing for the Loyola Ramblers. He moved in 2024 to MSV Duisburg, signing a new contract in 2025.

== Career statistics ==
As of 15 September 2026

Appearances and goals by club, season and competition
Club	Season	League			Cup		Other		Total	
Club	Season	Division	Apps	Goals	Apps	Goals	Apps	Goals	Apps	Goals
VfB Oldenburg	2018–19	Regionalliga Nord	1	0	—		—		1	0
VfB Oldenburg	2019–20	Regionalliga Nord	4	0	—		—		4	0
VfB Oldenburg	2020–21	Regionalliga Nord	1	0	—		—		1	0
VfB Oldenburg	2021–22	Regionalliga Nord	5	0	—		—		5	0
VfB Oldenburg	2022–23	3. Liga	24	0	—		—		24	0
VfB Oldenburg	Total		35	0	—		—		35	0
Eintracht Frankfurt II	2023–24	Regionalliga Südwest	29	9	—		—		29	9
MSV Duisburg	2024–25	Regionalliga West	29	10	—		—		29	10
MSV Duisburg	2025–26	3. Liga	4	0	—		—		4	0
MSV Duisburg	2026–27	3. Liga	3	0	0	0	—		3	0
MSV Duisburg	Total		36	10	0	0	—		36	10
Career total			100	19	0	0	—		100	10
