= Rasim Bulić =

German footballer

Personal information
- Date of birth: 10 December 2000 (age 25)
- Place of birth: Frankfurt, Germany
- Height: 1.92 m (6 ft 4 in)
- Position: Midfielder

Team information
- Current team: MSV Duisburg
- Number: 6

Youth career
- –2018: SG Rosenhöhe
- 2018–2019: Kickers Offenbach

Senior career*
Years	Team	Apps	(Gls)
2019–2022	1. FC Saarbrücken	14	(0)
2022–2023	Mainz 05 II	29	(1)
2023–2025	Jahn Regensburg	65	(1)
2025–	MSV Duisburg	44	(2)
- * Club domestic league appearances and goals as of 17:41, 7 November 2026 (UTC)

Rasim Bulić (born 10 December 2000) is a German professional footballer who plays as a midfielder for MSV Duisburg.

== Career ==
Bulić started his youth career at SG Rosenhöhe before joining Kickers Offenbach.

Bulić signed with Regionalliga side 1. FC Saarbrücken ahead of the 2019–20 season. He made two appearances in his first season as Saarbrücken won promotion to the 3. Liga. He made six more league appearances in the 2020–21 season.

On 12 January 2022, Bulić moved to Mainz 05 II. After two years at Jahn Regensburg he moved to MSV Duisburg for the 2025–26 season. He signed a new contract with Duisburg in June 2026.

== Career statistics ==
As of 7 November 2026

Appearances and goals by club, season and competition
Club	Season	League			Cup		Other		Total	
Club	Season	Division	Apps	Goals	Apps	Goals	Apps	Goals	Apps	Goals
1. FC Saarbrücken	2019–20	Regionalliga Südwest	2	0	1	0	—		3	0
1. FC Saarbrücken	2020–21	3. Liga	6	0	—		—		6	0
1. FC Saarbrücken	2021–22	3. Liga	6	0	—		—		6	0
1. FC Saarbrücken	Total		14	0	1	0	—		15	0
Mainz 05 II	2021–22	Regionalliga Südwest	13	1	—		—		13	1
Mainz 05 II	2022–23	Regionalliga Südwest	16	0	—		—		16	0
Mainz 05 II	Total		29	1	—		—		29	1
Jahn Regensburg	2023–24	3. Liga	35	0	—		2 (Note: Appearances in promotion play-offs)	0	37	0
Jahn Regensburg	2024–25	2. Bundesliga	30	1	2	1	—		32	2
Jahn Regensburg	Total		65	1	2	1	2	0	69	2
MSV Duisburg	2025–26	3. Liga	31	1	—		—		31	1
MSV Duisburg	2026–27	3. Liga	13	1	1	0	—		14	1
MSV Duisburg	Total		44	2	1	0	0	0	45	2
Career total			152	4	4	1	2	0	158	5
