= Ben Schlicke =

German footballer (born 2005)

Personal information
- Date of birth: 31 October 2005 (age 21)
- Place of birth: Cologne, Germany
- Height: 1.87 m (6 ft 2 in)
- Position: Defender

Team information
- Current team: MSV Duisburg
- Number: 40

Youth career
- –2019: SC Eltersdorf
- 2021–2024: Greuther Fürth

Senior career*
Years	Team	Apps	(Gls)
2022–2024	Greuther Fürth	0	(0)
2022–2024	Greuther Fürth II	29	(0)
2024–2025	SpVgg Unterhaching	14	(0)
2025–	MSV Duisburg	25	(1)
- * Club domestic league appearances and goals as of 17:40, 7 November 2026 (UTC)

Ben Schlicke (born 31 October 2005) is a German professional footballer who plays as a defender for German 3. Liga club MSV Duisburg.

== Career ==
Schlicke spent several years in Bavaria before moving to MSV Duisburg in 2025. He signed a contract extension in October 2026.

== Personal life ==
He is the son of former professional footballer Björn Schlicke.

== Career statistics ==
As of 7 November 2026

Appearances and goals by club, season and competition
Club	Season	League			Cup		Other		Total	
Club	Season	Division	Apps	Goals	Apps	Goals	Apps	Goals	Apps	Goals
Greuther Fürth II	2022–23	Regionalliga Bayern	8	0	—		—		8	0
Greuther Fürth II	2023–24	Regionalliga Bayern	21	0	—		—		21	0
Greuther Fürth II	Total		29	0	—		—		29	0
Greuther Fürth	2023–24	2. Bundesliga	0	0	1	0	—		1	0
SpVgg Unterhaching	2024–25	3. Liga	14	0	—		—		14	0
MSV Duisburg	2025–26	3. Liga	15	0	—		—		15	0
MSV Duisburg	2026–27	3. Liga	10	1	0	0	—		10	1
MSV Duisburg	Total		25	1	0	0	—		25	1
Career total			68	1	1	0	—		69	1
