= Tobias Fleckstein =

German footballer

Personal information
- Date of birth: 24 April 1999 (age 27)
- Place of birth: Herne, Germany
- Height: 1.90 m (6 ft 3 in)
- Position: Centre-back

Team information
- Current team: MSV Duisburg
- Number: 5

Youth career
- 2005–2007: SV Teutonia Riemke
- 2007–2018: Schalke 04

Senior career*
Years	Team	Apps	(Gls)
2018–2020	Holstein Kiel II	45	(2)
2020–	MSV Duisburg	174	(11)
- * Club domestic league appearances and goals as of 15:11, 31 October 2026 (UTC)

Tobias Fleckstein (born 24 April 1999) is a German professional footballer who plays as a centre-back for MSV Duisburg.

== Career ==
In the summer of 2020, Fleckstein moved to MSV Duisburg. He made his professional debut for MSV Duisburg in the first round of the 2020–21 DFB-Pokal on 14 September 2020, in the home match against Bundesliga side Borussia Dortmund. He made his 3. Liga debut in a 1–1 draw against FSV Zwickau on 26 September 2020. He signed a new three-year contract on 16 May 2022, keeping him with the club until 2025. After the relegation to the Regionalliga West in 2023–24, he signed a new contract with Duisburg. In January 2026, he signed a new contract with Duisburg.

== Career statistics ==
As of 31 October 2026

Appearances and goals by club, season and competition
Club	Season	League			Cup		Total	
Club	Season	Division	Apps	Goals	Apps	Goals	Apps	Goals
Holstein Kiel II	2018–19	Regionalliga Nord	29	0	—		29	0
Holstein Kiel II	2019–20	Regionalliga Nord	16	2	—		16	2
Holstein Kiel II	Total		45	2	0	0	45	2
MSV Duisburg	2020–21	3. Liga	25	1	1	0	26	1
MSV Duisburg	2021–22	3. Liga	20	2	—		20	2
MSV Duisburg	2022–23	3. Liga	20	1	—		20	1
MSV Duisburg	2023–24	3. Liga	27	0	—		27	0
MSV Duisburg	2024–25	Regionalliga West	33	2	—		33	2
MSV Duisburg	2025–26	3. Liga	37	3	—		37	3
MSV Duisburg	2026–27	3. Liga	12	2	1	0	13	2
MSV Duisburg	Total		174	11	2	0	176	11
Career total			219	13	2	0	220	13
