= Andy Visser =

Dutch footballer (born 2004)

Personal information
- Date of birth: 22 September 2004 (age 22)
- Place of birth: Dieren, Netherlands
- Height: 1.93 m (6 ft 4 in)
- Position: Forward

Team information
- Current team: TOP Oss
- Number: 9

Youth career
- 2021-2022: VV Dieren
- 2022–2023: MASV
- 2023–2024: Vitesse

Senior career*
Years	Team	Apps	(Gls)
2023–2025	Vitesse	39	(4)
2025–2026	MSV Duisburg	4	(0)
2026	→ Jong Sparta (loan)	13	(5)
2026–	TOP Oss	1	(0)
- * Club domestic league appearances and goals as of 11:53, 19 September 2026 (UTC)

Andy Visser (born 22 September 2004) is a Dutch professional footballer who plays as a forward for Eerste Divisie club TOP Oss.

== Club career ==
Visser made his debut for Vitesse as an 81st-minute substitute for Marco van Ginkel in a KNVB Cup fixture against sc Heerenveen. They ended up winning 1–0 with an 86th-minute winner from Amine Boutrah. He moved to MSV Duisburg in September 2025.

On 4 February 2026, Visser returned to the Netherlands and joined Jong Sparta on loan until the end of the 2025–26 season. He left Duisburg on 31 August 2026.

On 2 September 2026, Visser signed a one-year contract with Eerste Divisie club TOP Oss, with a one-year club option.

== Career statistics ==
As of match played 26 June 2026

Appearances and goals by club, season and competition
Club	Season	League			National cup		Other		Total	
Club	Season	Division	Apps	Goals	Apps	Goals	Apps	Goals	Apps	Goals
Vitesse	2023–24	Eredivisie	9	0	2	0	0	0	11	0
Vitesse	2024–25	Eerste Divisie	30	4	1	0	0	0	31	4
Vitesse	Total		39	4	3	0	0	0	42	4
MSV Duisburg	2025–26	3. Liga	4	0	—		0	0	4	0
Jong Sparta (loan)	2025–26	Tweede Divisie	13	5	—		0	0	13	5
TOP Oss	2026–27	Eerste Divisie	1	0	0	0	0	0	1	0
Career total			57	9	3	0	0	0	60	9
