= Patrick Sussek =

German footballer

Personal information
- Date of birth: 8 February 2000 (age 26)
- Place of birth: Ingolstadt, Germany
- Height: 1.76 m (5 ft 9 in)
- Position: Midfielder

Team information
- Current team: MSV Duisburg
- Number: 37

Youth career
- –2011: DJK Ingolstadt
- 2011–2018: FC Ingolstadt

Senior career*
Years	Team	Apps	(Gls)
2017–2021	FC Ingolstadt II	48	(5)
2018–2021	FC Ingolstadt	17	(0)
2022	Fortuna Düsseldorf II	18	(2)
2022–2023	Berliner AK 07	31	(10)
2023–2024	BFC Dynamo	33	(2)
2024–	MSV Duisburg	73	(23)

International career
2017	Germany U18	3	(0)
2018	Germany U19	3	(1)
- * Club domestic league appearances and goals as of 14:15, 24 October 2026 (UTC)

Patrick Sussek (born 8 February 2000) is a German professional footballer who plays as a midfielder for MSV Duisburg.

== Career ==
Sussek made his professional debut for FC Ingolstadt in the 3. Liga on 22 July 2019, coming on as a substitute in the 90+3rd minute for Maximilian Wolfram in the 2–1 away win against Carl Zeiss Jena. After two years in Berlin playing in the Regionalliga Nordost he moved to MSV Duisburg of the Regionalliga West for the 2024–25 season. He re-signed with Duisburg in May 2025.

== Career statistics ==
As of 24 October 2026

Appearances and goals by club, season and competition
Club	Season	League			Cup		Total	
Club	Season	Division	Apps	Goals	Apps	Goals	Apps	Goals
FC Ingolstadt II	2017–18	Regionalliga Bayern	14	1	—		14	1
FC Ingolstadt II	2018–19	Regionalliga Bayern	27	3	—		27	3
FC Ingolstadt II	2019–20	Regionalliga Bayern	4	1	—		4	1
FC Ingolstadt II	2021–22	Regionalliga Bayern	3	0	—		3	0
FC Ingolstadt II	Total		48	5	—		48	5
FC Ingolstadt	2019–20	3. Liga	12	0	1	0	13	0
FC Ingolstadt	2020–21	3. Liga	5	0	—		5	0
FC Ingolstadt	Total		17	0	1	0	18	0
Fortuna Düsseldorf II	2021–22	Regionalliga West	18	2	—		18	2
Berliner AK 07	2022–23	Regionalliga Nordost	31	10	—		31	10
BFC Dynamo	2023–24	Regionalliga Nordost	33	2	—		33	2
MSV Duisburg	2024–25	Regionalliga West	32	14	—		32	14
MSV Duisburg	2025–26	3. Liga	33	7	—		33	7
MSV Duisburg	2026–27	3. Liga	8	2	1	0	9	2
MSV Duisburg	Total		73	23	1	0	74	23
Career total			220	42	2	0	222	42
