= Aljaž Casar =

Slovenian footballer (born 2000)

Personal information
- Date of birth: 17 September 2000 (age 26)
- Place of birth: Murska Sobota, Slovenia
- Height: 1.91 m (6 ft 3 in)
- Position: Midfielder

Team information
- Current team: MSV Duisburg
- Number: 8

Youth career
- 2005–2008: Bakovci
- 2008–2009: Mura 05
- 2009–2012: Maribor
- 2012–2013: Mura 05
- 2013–2014: Maribor
- 2013–2014: → Pobrežje (loan)
- 2014–2015: Veržej
- 2016–2019: Mura

Senior career*
Years	Team	Apps	(Gls)
2017–2018	Rakičan	22	(5)
2018	Odranci	13	(3)
2019–2021	SC Rheindorf Altach	24	(1)
2019	SC Rheindorf Altach II	6	(0)
2021–2022	TSG Hoffenheim II	30	(1)
2022–2024	Hallescher FC	64	(3)
2024–2026	Dynamo Dresden	45	(1)
2026–	MSV Duisburg	27	(3)

International career
2021	Slovenia U21	6	(0)
- * Club domestic league appearances and goals as of 17:41, 7 November 2026 (UTC)

Aljaž Casar (born 17 September 2000) is a Slovenian professional footballer who plays as a midfielder for German 3. Liga club MSV Duisburg.

== Career ==
In January 2026, he moved to MSV Duisburg.

== Career statistics ==
As of 7 November 2026

Appearances and goals by club, season and competition
Club	Season	League			National cup (Note: Includes Austrian Cup, DFB-Pokal)		Other		Total	
Club	Season	Division	Apps	Goals	Apps	Goals	Apps	Goals	Apps	Goals
Rakičan	2017–18	Slovenian Third League	22	5	—		—		22	5
Odranci	2018–19	Slovenian Third League	13	3	—		—		13	3
SC Rheindorf Altach	2019–20	Austrian Football Bundesliga	3	0	1	0	—		4	0
SC Rheindorf Altach	2020–21	Austrian Football Bundesliga	21	1	2	2	—		23	3
SC Rheindorf Altach	Total		24	1	3	2	—		27	3
SC Rheindorf Altach II	2021–22	Austrian Regionalliga	6	0	—		—		6	0
TSG Hoffenheim II	2021–22	Regionalliga Südwest	30	1	—		—		30	1
Hallescher FC	2022–23	3. Liga	30	1	—		—		30	1
Hallescher FC	2023–24	3. Liga	34	2	1	0	—		35	2
Hallescher FC	Total		64	3	1	0	—		65	3
Dynamo Dresden	2024–25	2. Bundesliga	33	1	2	0	—		35	1
Dynamo Dresden	2025–26	2. Bundesliga	12	0	0	0	—		12	0
Dynamo Dresden	Total		45	1	2	0	—		47	1
MSV Duisburg	2025–26	3. Liga	15	2	—		—		15	2
MSV Duisburg	2026–27	3. Liga	12	1	1	0	—		13	1
MSV Duisburg	Total		27	1	1	0	—		28	1
Career total			231	17	7	2	—		238	19
