= Maximilian Braune =

German footballer

Personal information
- Date of birth: 6 July 2003 (age 23)
- Place of birth: Oberhausen, Germany
- Height: 1.86 m (6 ft 1 in)
- Position: Goalkeeper

Team information
- Current team: MSV Duisburg
- Number: 1

Youth career
- 2018–2020: Schalke 04
- 2020–2022: MSV Duisburg

Senior career*
| Years | Team | Apps | (Gls) |
| 2022– | MSV Duisburg | 94 | (0) |
- * Club domestic league appearances and goals as of 17:39, 7 November 2026 (UTC)

Maximilian Braune (born 6 July 2003) is a German professional footballer who plays as a goalkeeper for MSV Duisburg.

== Career ==
Braune signed his first contract with MSV Duisburg on 7 February 2022. He made his professional debut for MSV Duisburg on 23 January 2023, in the 3. Liga match against Waldhof Mannheim. He signed a new contract in January 2024, running until 2026. In December 2025, he signed a new contract with Duisburg.

== Career statistics ==
As of 7 November 2026

Appearances and goals by club, season and competition
| Club | Season | League | | | Cup | | Total | |
| Club | Season | Division | Apps | Goals | Apps | Goals | Apps | Goals |
|---|---|---|---|---|---|---|---|---|
| MSV Duisburg | 2022–23 | 3. Liga | 6 | 0 | — | | 6 | 0 |
| MSV Duisburg | 2023–24 | 3. Liga | 5 | 0 | — | | 5 | 0 |
| MSV Duisburg | 2024–25 | Regionalliga West | 32 | 0 | — | | 32 | 0 |
| MSV Duisburg | 2025–26 | 3. Liga | 38 | 0 | — | | 38 | 0 |
| MSV Duisburg | 2026–27 | 3. Liga | 13 | 0 | 1 | 0 | 14 | 0 |
| MSV Duisburg | Total | | 94 | 0 | 1 | 0 | 95 | 0 |
