= Florian Egerer =

German footballer (born 1998)

Personal information
- Date of birth: 17 February 1998 (age 28)
- Place of birth: Berlin, Germany
- Height: 1.80 m (5 ft 11 in)
- Position: Midfielder

Youth career
- SC Staaken
- –2011: SC Schwarz-Weiß Spandau
- 2011–2017: Hertha BSC

Senior career*
Years	Team	Apps	(Gls)
2017–2019	Hertha BSC II	61	(4)
2019–2022	SV Meppen	92	(2)
2022–2024	VfB Lübeck	63	(3)
2024–2026	MSV Duisburg	34	(0)
- * Club domestic league appearances and goals as of 17:18, 22 December 2025 (UTC)

Florian Egerer (born 17 February 1998) is a German professional footballer who plays as a midfielder.

== Career ==
Egerer made his professional debut for SV Meppen in the 3. Liga on 20 July 2019, starting before being substituted out at half-time for Janik Jesgarzewski in the home match against FSV Zwickau, which finished as a 2–0 loss. On 14 September 2019 Egerer scored for the first time against 1. FC Kaiserslautern. After playing in Meppen for three and VfB Lübeck two years, he moved to MSV Duisburg in the summer of 2024. He left Duisburg at the end of the 2025–26 season.

== Career statistics ==
As of 21 December 2025

Appearances and goals by club, season and competition
Club	Season	Division	League		Cup		Total	
Club	Season	Division	Apps	Goals	Apps	Goals	Apps	Goals
Hertha BSC II	2016–17	Regionalliga Nordost	1	0	—		1	0
Hertha BSC II	2017–18	Regionalliga Nordost	28	2	—		28	2
Hertha BSC II	2018–19	Regionalliga Nordost	32	2	—		32	2
Hertha BSC II	Total		61	4	—		61	4
SV Meppen	2019–20	3. Liga	37	2	—		37	2
SV Meppen	2020–21	3. Liga	36	0	—		36	0
SV Meppen	2021–22	3. Liga	19	0	1	0	20	0
SV Meppen	Total		92	2	1	0	93	2
VfB Lübeck	2022–23	Regionalliga Nord	26	3	—		26	3
VfB Lübeck	2023–24	3. Liga	37	0	1	0	38	0
VfB Lübeck	Total		63	3	—		64	3
MSV Duisburg	2024–25	Regionalliga West	33	0	—		33	0
MSV Duisburg	2025–26	3. Liga	1	0	—		1	0
MSV Duisburg	Total		34	0	—		34	0
Career total			250	9	2	0	252	9
