= Peter Remmert =

German footballer (born 2005)

Personal information
- Date of birth: 9 July 2005 (age 21)
- Place of birth: Vechta, Germany
- Height: 1.93 m (6 ft 4 in)
- Position: Forward

Team information
- Current team: MSV Duisburg (on loan from Schalke 04)
- Number: 39

Youth career
- 2009–2016: SFN Vechta
- 2016–2020: Blau-Weiß Lohne
- 2020–2021: JFV Nordwest
- 2022–2024: VfL Osnabrück

Senior career*
Years	Team	Apps	(Gls)
2024–	Schalke 04	5	(0)
2024–	Schalke 04 II	29	(5)
2026–	→ MSV Duisburg (loan)	10	(5)
- * Club domestic league appearances and goals as of 17:42, 7 November 2026 (UTC)

Peter Remmert (born 9 July 2005) is a German professional footballer who plays as a forward for 3. Liga club MSV Duisburg, on loan from Schalke 04.

== Career ==
Remmert signed a professional contract with Schalke 04 on 22 June 2024, lasting until 2028. He made his first team debut for the club in the 2. Bundesliga in a 1–0 home win against Preußen Münster on 28 February 2025.

On 30 June 2026, Remmert was loaned to 3. Liga club MSV Duisburg until June 2027.

== Career statistics ==
As of 7 November 2026

Appearances and goals by club, season and competition
Club	Season	League			DFB-Pokal		Total	
Club	Season	Division	Apps	Goals	Apps	Goals	Apps	Goals
Schalke 04 II	2024–25	Regionalliga West	18	3	—		18	3
Schalke 04 II	2025–26	Regionalliga West	11	2	—		11	2
Schalke 04 II	Total		29	5	—		29	5
Schalke 04	2024–25	2. Bundesliga	2	0	0	0	2	0
Schalke 04	2025–26	2. Bundesliga	3	0	1	0	4	0
Schalke 04	Total		5	0	1	0	6	0
MSV Duisburg (loan)	2026–27	3. Liga	10	5	0	0	10	5
Career total			44	10	1	0	45	10

== Honours ==
Schalke 04

- 2. Bundesliga: 2025–26
