= Joshua Bitter =

German professional footballer

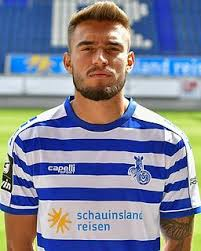

Personal information
- Date of birth: 1 January 1997 (age 29)
- Place of birth: Dorsten, Germany
- Height: 1.86 m (6 ft 1 in)
- Position: Right-back

Team information
- Current team: MSV Duisburg
- Number: 29

Youth career
- 2004–2007: FC Rot Weiss Dorsten
- 2007–2016: Schalke 04

Senior career*
| Years | Team | Apps | (Gls) |
| 2016–2018 | Schalke 04 II | 49 | (3) |
| 2018–2019 | Werder Bremen II | 21 | (2) |
| 2019–2021 | MSV Duisburg | 45 | (0) |
| 2022 | Energie Cottbus | 3 | (0) |
| 2022– | MSV Duisburg | 131 | (10) |

International career
| 2015 | Germany U19 | 2 | (1) |
| 2016 | Germany U20 | 3 | (0) |
- * Club domestic league appearances and goals as of 17:40, 7 November 2026 (UTC)

Joshua Bitter (born 1 January 1997) is a German professional footballer who plays as a right-back for MSV Duisburg.

== Career ==
Bitter moved to MSV Duisburg on 6 June 2019. He made his professional debut for MSV Duisburg in the 3. Liga on 20 July 2019, starting in the home match against Sonnenhof Großaspach. On 26 May 2021, it was announced that he would leave Duisburg at the end of the 2020–21 season. In January 2022, he joined Energie Cottbus. He left Cottbus in the summer of 2022 and re-joined MSV Duisburg. He signed a new contract with Duisburg after the 2024–25 season. On 1 March he signed a new contrackt with Duisburg.

== Career statistics ==
As of 7 November 2026

Appearances and goals by club, season and competition
| Club | Season | Division | League | | Cup | | Total | |
| Club | Season | Division | Apps | Goals | Apps | Goals | Apps | Goals |
|---|---|---|---|---|---|---|---|---|
| Schalke 04 II | 2016–17 | Regionalliga West | 22 | 1 | — | | 22 | 1 |
| Schalke 04 II | 2017–18 | Oberliga Niederrhein | 27 | 2 | — | | 27 | 2 |
| Schalke 04 II | Total | | 49 | 3 | — | | 49 | 3 |
| Werder Bremen II | 2018–19 | Regionalliga Nord | 21 | 2 | — | | 21 | 2 |
| MSV Duisburg | 2019–20 | 3. Liga | 25 | 0 | 2 | 0 | 27 | 0 |
| MSV Duisburg | 2020–21 | 3. Liga | 20 | 0 | 0 | 0 | 20 | 0 |
| MSV Duisburg | Total | | 45 | 0 | 2 | 0 | 47 | 0 |
| Energie Cottbus | 2021–22 | Regionalliga Nordost | 3 | 0 | — | | 3 | 0 |
| MSV Duisburg | 2022–23 | 3. Liga | 30 | 2 | — | | 30 | 2 |
| MSV Duisburg | 2023–24 | 3. Liga | 28 | 2 | — | | 28 | 2 |
| MSV Duisburg | 2024–25 | Regionalliga West | 25 | 0 | — | | 25 | 0 |
| MSV Duisburg | 2025–26 | 3. Liga | 36 | 6 | — | | 36 | 6 |
| MSV Duisburg | 2026–27 | 3. Liga | 12 | 0 | 1 | 0 | 13 | 0 |
| MSV Duisburg | Total | | 131 | 10 | 1 | 0 | 132 | 10 |
| Career total | | | 249 | 15 | 3 | 0 | 252 | 15 |
