= Omer Hanin =

Israeli-Portuguese footballer

Personal information
- Date of birth: 14 May 1998 (age 28)
- Place of birth: Rishon LeZion, Israel
- Height: 1.96 m (6 ft 5 in)
- Position: Goalkeeper

Team information
- Current team: TSV Havelse
- Number: 13

Youth career
- –2007: Hapoel Rishon LeZion
- 2007–2013: Maccabi Tel Aviv
- 2013–2015: Hapoel Tel Aviv
- 2015–2017: Hapoel Rishon LeZion

Senior career*
Years	Team	Apps	(Gls)
2016–2017	Hapoel Rishon LeZion	2	(0)
2017–2018	Hapoel Petah Tikva	0	(0)
2018–2019	Hapoel Hadera	3	(0)
2019–2022	Mainz 05 II	8	(0)
2019–2022	Mainz 05	0	(0)
2022–2023	FSV Frankfurt	27	(0)
2024–2025	Waldhof Mannheim	12	(0)
2025	Hapoel Haifa	0	(0)
2025–2026	MSV Duisburg	0	(0)
2026–	TSV Havelse	0	(0)

International career
2016	Israel U18	1	(0)
2016–2017	Israel U19	3	(0)
- * Club domestic league appearances and goals as of 12:46, 24 August 2025 (UTC)

Omer Hanin (Hebrew: עומר חנין; born 14 May 1998) is an Israeli professional footballer who plays as a goalkeeper for TSV Havelse.

== Early life ==
He also hold a Portuguese passport, which eases the move to certain European football leagues.

== Club career ==
Hanin made his professional debut for Hapoel Hadera in the Israeli Premier League on 5 December 2018, coming on as a substitute in the 55th minute for Austin Ejide against Hapoel Ra'anana, which finished as a 0–0 home draw.

On 23 June 2022, Hanin signed with FSV Frankfurt.

On 3 February 2024, Hanin joined Waldhof Mannheim in 3. Liga. After moving to Hapoel Haifa after one year, he signed with MSV Duisburg in August 2025. He left Duisburg the next summer. He signed with TSV Havelse on 5 August 2026.

== International career ==
Hanin has been a youth international for both the Israel U-18 and the Israel-U19 since 2016.

Hanin has also been called up for the Israel U-21 in 2018, ahead of 2019 UEFA U-21 Euros qualifiers matches, as well ahead of the 2021 UEFA U-21 Euros qualifiers match against Kazakhstan U-21 which ended in a 1–2 away win for his native Israel U-21.
