= Niklas Jessen =

German footballer (born 2003)

Niklas Jensen
Personal information
- Date of birth: 4 September 2003 (age 23)
- Place of birth: Hamburg, Germany
- Height: 1.82 m (6 ft 0 in)
- Position: Right-back

Team information
- Current team: MSV Duisburg
- Number: 20

Youth career
- 2013: Walddörfer SV
- 2013–2017: FC St. Pauli
- 2017–2019: Bayern Munich
- 2019–2021: FC St. Pauli

Senior career*
Years	Team	Apps	(Gls)
2021–2024	FC St. Pauli II	73	(0)
2022	FC St. Pauli	0	(0)
2024–2025	Borussia Dortmund II	20	(0)
2025–	MSV Duisburg	31	(0)

International career
2018	Germany U15	1	(0)
2019	Germany U16	2	(0)
2021–2022	Germany U19	5	(0)
- * Club domestic league appearances and goals as of 17:40, 7 November 2026 (UTC)

Nikias Jessen (born 4 September 2003) is a German professional footballer who plays as a right-back for 3. Liga club MSV Duisburg.

== Early life ==
Niklas Jessen was born in Hamburg, Germany.

== Career ==
As a youth player, Jessen played for Bayern Munich, FC St. Pauli and Walddörfer SV. In 2022, he was called up for FC St. Pauli's senior team, where he had been playing in the academy 2013 to 2017 and 2019 to 2021. In 2024, Jessen moved away from the Hamburg-based club and moved to Borussia Dortmund II, which he spent a year at before moving to MSV Duisburg in 2025.

== Career statistics ==
As of match played on 7 November 2026

Appearances and goals by club, season and competition
Club	Season	League			National cup		Other		Total	
Club	Season	Division	Apps	Goals	Apps	Goals	Apps	Goals	Apps	Goals
FC St. Pauli II	2021–22	Regionalliga Nord	19	0	—		5 (Note: Appearances in relegation round)	0	24	0
FC St. Pauli II	2022–23	Regionalliga Nord	21	0	—		—		21	0
FC St. Pauli II	2023–24	Regionalliga Nord	33	0	—		—		33	0
FC St. Pauli II	Total		73	0	—		5	0	78	0
Borussia Dortmund II	2024–25	Regionalliga West	20	0	—		—		20	0
MSV Duisburg	2025–26	3. Liga	22	0	—		—		22	0
MSV Duisburg	2026–27	3. Liga	9	0	0	0	—		9	0
MSV Duisburg	Total		31	0	0	0	—		31	0
Career total			124	0	0	0	5	0	129	0
