= Ramien Safi =

German footballer

Personal information
- Date of birth: 17 October 1999 (age 27)
- Place of birth: Groningen, Netherlands
- Height: 1.77 m (5 ft 10 in)
- Position: Midfielder

Team information
- Current team: MSV Duisburg
- Number: 19

Youth career
- 2017–2018: JFV RWD Rehden

Senior career*
Years	Team	Apps	(Gls)
2018–2019	TuS Sulingen	26	(8)
2019–2020	TB Uphusen	19	(2)
2020–2022	Brinkumer SV	41	(37)
2022–2024	SV Rödinghausen	67	(15)
2024–2026	Rot-Weiss Essen	73	(9)
2026–	MSV Duisburg	8	(0)
- * Club domestic league appearances and goals as of 17:34, 18 October 2026 (UTC)

Ramien Safi (born 17 October 1999) is a Dutch professional footballer who plays as a midfielder for German 3. Liga club MSV Duisburg.

== Career ==
Safi played for several teams in lower league before signing with SV Rödinghausen and then Rot-Weiss Essen. In June 2026, he moved to MSV Duisburg.

== Career statistics ==
As of 18 October 2026

Appearances and goals by club, season and competition
Club	Season	League			Cup		Other		Total	
Club	Season	Division	Apps	Goals	Apps	Goals	Apps	Goals	Apps	Goals
TuS Sulingen	2018–19	Landesliga Hannover	26	8	—		—		26	8
TB Uphusen	2019–20	Oberliga Niedersachsen	19	2	—		—		19	2
Brinkumer SV	2020–22	Bremen-Liga	41	37	—		—		41	37
SV Rödinghausen	2023–24	Regionalliga West	34	5	1	0	—		35	5
SV Rödinghausen	2024–25	Regionalliga West	33	10	—		—		33	10
SV Rödinghausen	Total		67	15	1	0	—		68	15
Rot-Weiss Essen	2024–25	3. Liga	37	6	1	1	—		38	7
Rot-Weiss Essen	2025–26	3. Liga	36	3	1	0	2 (Note: Appearances in promotion play-offs)	0	39	3
Rot-Weiss Essen	Total		73	9	2	1	2	0	77	10
MSV Duisburg	2026–27	3. Liga	8	0	1	0	—		9	0
Career total			234	71	4	1	2	0	240	72
