= MSV Duisburg =

Association football club in Germany

- Full name: Meidericher Spielverein 02 e. V. Duisburg
- Nickname: Die Zebras (The Zebras)
- Founded: 2 June 1902; 124 years ago
- Ground: MSV-Arena
- Capacity: 31,364
- Owners: MSV Duisburg GmbH & Co. KGaA; 59.9% Meidericher Spielverein 02 e.V. Duisburg; 40.1% Capelli Sport
- Chairman: Christian Stiefelhagen
- Head coach: Dietmar Hirsch
- League: 3. Liga
- 2025–26: 3. Liga, 4th of 20
- Website: www.msv-duisburg.de
Home colours	Away colours	Third colours

Meidericher Spielverein 02 e. V. Duisburg, commonly known as simply MSV Duisburg (German pronunciation: [ʔɛm ʔɛs faʊ ˈdyːsbʊɐ̯k]), is a German association football club based in Duisburg, North Rhine-Westphalia. Nicknamed Die Zebras for their traditional striped jerseys, the club was one of the original members of the Bundesliga when it was formed in 1963.

== History ==
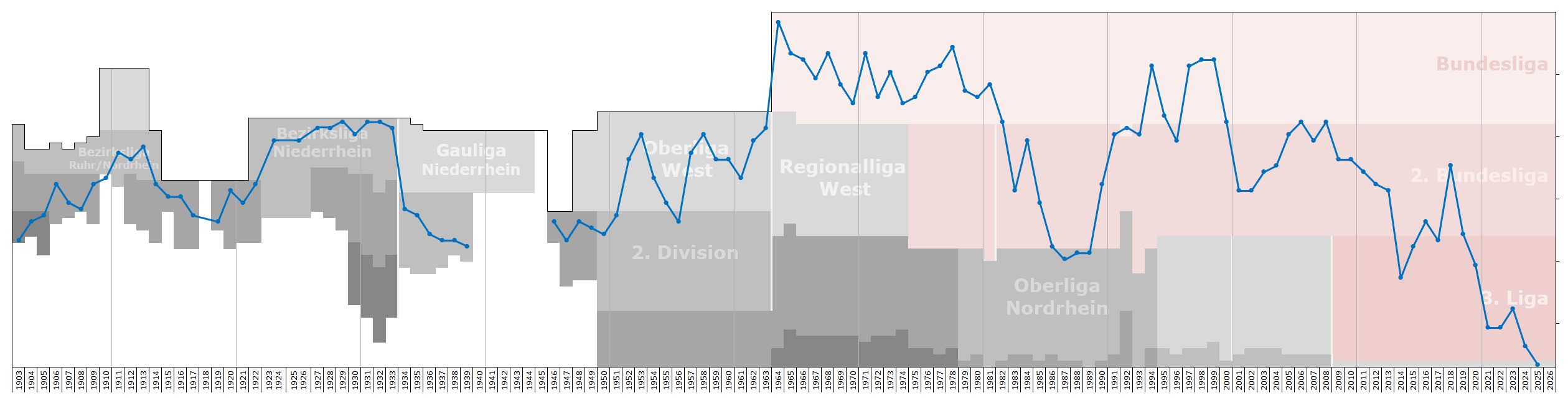
Historical chart of MSV Duisburg league performance

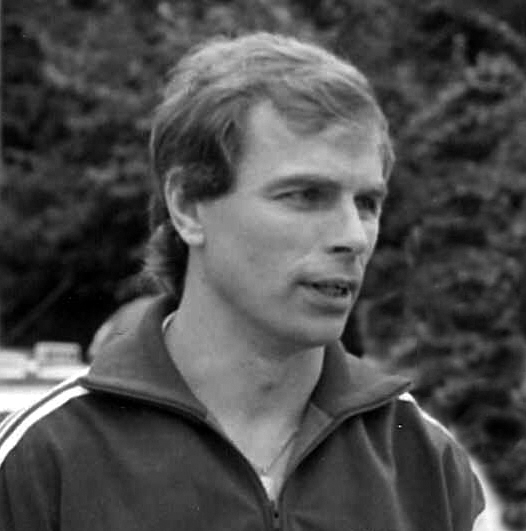
Bernard Dietz

=== Early years ===
The club was founded in 1902 as Meidericher Spielverein, in Meiderich, which later became part of Duisburg. In 1905, they fused with the club Sportclub Viktoria Meiderich.

In 1910, MSV played in the West German A-Klasse for the first time, and in 1914, won promotion to the 'Zehnerliga' (top level of the West German championship) for the first time, after winning every game in the 13/14 season, scoring 113 goals and conceding only 12.

In 1929, they won the first Niederrhein championship and were runner up in the West German championship, qualifying for the national championship for the first time. They won the Niederrhein championship again in 1931 and 1932, and appeared in the 1931 German championship again after finishing third in the West German championship. The club would not qualify for either the German championship or the West German championship again.

Meiderich became city champions in 1946, and in 1949 were placed in the new West German second division. The club earned promotion to the top-flight Oberliga West in 1951, and though they were relegated in 1955, they would return immediately and participate in the Oberliga West until the formation of the Bundesliga in 1963.

=== Early years of the Bundesliga (1960s) ===
Former logo of MSV Duisburg

The club was surprisingly chosen to be a member of the new national league, the Bundesliga, for the inaugural 1963–64 season. Despite not being a big name or coming from a big city, Meiderich were chosen as they were the strongest club from the populous Lower Rhine region; this decision was controversial, and Alemannia Aachen challenged the decision in court.

The club signed young coach Rudi Gutendorf for the first Bundesliga season, replacing the highly regarded Willi Multhaup. He convinced the board to sign World Cup-winner Helmut Rahn, and developed a tactical system later compared to Dutch total football, whereby every player contributed in both attack and defence. Gutendorf's team shocked the Bundesliga by finishing second, six points behind champions 1. FC Köln, and conceding the fewest goals in the league. This remains the club's highest ever league finish.

In 1966, they finished with a club record 70 goals scored in the league, including the Bundesliga's biggest ever away win, 9–0 against Tasmania Berlin. They also reached the DFB-Pokal final, losing to Bayern Munich. This was the last season played under the old name of Meidericher SV, as the club renamed itself MSV Duisburg in 1967, having received financial support from the city of Duisburg.

=== European campaigns and relegation to the Oberliga (1970s, 1980s) ===
In 1976, MSV Duisburg reached the DFB-Pokal final for the second time, but lost to Eintracht Frankfurt. They then made their first appearance in the UEFA Cup, losing in the second round to Levski-Spartak Sofia on away goals. This season was also notable for the performances of defender and captain Bernard Dietz, who played every minute of the league season and was voted by Sport Bild as one of the league's best players. Dietz would achieve this three more times, being named the Bundesliga's best outfield player in 1978, and captaining Germany to victory at UEFA Euro 1980 while still at Duisburg.

Duisburg finished 9th in 1976–77, their first top-half finish since 1970–71, and then 6th in the 1977–78 Bundesliga, qualifying for the 1978–79 UEFA Cup. The club eliminated Lech Poznań, Carl Zeiss Jena, RC Strasbourg and Budapest Honvéd to reach the semi-final, where they were beaten by Borussia Mönchengladbach. Despite their success in Europe, Duisburg only narrowly avoided relegation, having been in the relegation zone during the winter break. In the 1981–82 season, the club was relegated from the Bundesliga for the first time, finishing last.

Four years later, Duisburg were relegated again, finishing last in the 2. Bundesliga with only 15 points from 38 games. For their final game, they managed a crowd of just 600 fans. The club spent three years in the third-tier Oberliga Nordrhein, before returning to the 2. Bundesliga in 1989. During their time in the regional leagues, Duisburg also won the German amateur championship by beating Bayern Munich II.

=== Between the Bundesliga and 2. Bundesliga (1990s, 2000s) ===
In their second season back in the second-tier, Duisburg finished runner up to Schalke 04, returning to the Bundesliga for the first time in nearly a decade. However, they would immediately be relegated back and would develop a reputation for 'yo-yoing' between the top two leagues. In 1993, with former player Ewald Lienen as coach, they again won promotion from the 2. Bundesliga. Lienen's Duisburg led the Bundesliga as late as February as a newly promoted team, becoming the first team to ever top the table with a negative goal difference; they eventually finished 9th, and were relegated again the following season.

Friedhelm Funkel brought the club back into the Bundesliga in 1996 and achieved three successive top-half finishes, also reaching the 1998 DFB-Pokal final. As in 1966, Duisburg lost to Bayern Munich. Duisburg qualified for the 1998–99 UEFA Cup Winners' Cup, but were heavily beaten by K.R.C. Genk, in the club's final European appearance to date. In March 2000, with his team bottom of the table, Friedhelm Funkel was sacked; the club was relegated at the end of the season.

The new 31,500-capacity MSV-Arena, was completed during the 2004–05 season, in which Duisburg once again won promotion after five years in the 2. Bundesliga. In December 2005, promotion-winning coach Norbert Meier was sacked after an incident in which he headbutted 1. FC Köln player Albert Streit during a game and pretended to have himself been attacked.

Duisburg finished last in the 2005–06 Bundesliga, won promotion back in 2006–07, and then finished last again in 2007–08.

=== Financial troubles (2010s, 2020s) ===
MSV Duisburg Anniversary logo used in the 2022–23 season

In 2011, MSV Duisburg surprisingly reached their fourth DFB-Pokal Final. Schalke won the match 5–0, the joint-biggest winning margin in a DFB-Pokal final.

After five years in the 2. Bundesliga, Duisburg were demoted to the 3. Liga in 2013 despite finishing 11th, after having their license application denied by the league for financial reasons. The possibility of the club becoming insolvent was raised by club officials.

Duisburg earned promotion back to the 2. Bundesliga for the 2015–16 season, but lasted only one season, losing to Würzburger Kickers in the relegation playoff; there were again concerns over whether the club would be granted a license. Duisburg won the 3. Liga for the first time in 2016–17 and finished in the top half of the 2. Bundesliga in 2017–18. The following year they were relegated back to the 3. Liga.

The club was reportedly under threat of insolvency again in 2022.

For the first time in the club's history, MSV Duisburg played in the fourth tier of German professional football, Regionalliga West, during the 2024–25 season, winning the league and immediate promotion back to 3. Liga.

== Crest ==
2022-23 anniversary logo

Logo without zebra (1996-now)

Regular logo (1996-now)

== Recent seasons ==
Year	Division	Tier	Position
1963–64	1. Bundesliga	I	2nd
1964–65	1. Bundesliga	I	7th
1965–66	1. Bundesliga	I	8th
1966–67	1. Bundesliga	I	11th
1967–68	1. Bundesliga	I	7th
1968–69	1. Bundesliga	I	12th
1969–70	1. Bundesliga	I	15th
1970–71	1. Bundesliga	I	7th
1971–72	1. Bundesliga	I	14th
1972–73	1. Bundesliga	I	10th
1973–74	1. Bundesliga	I	15th
1974–75	1. Bundesliga	I	14th
1975–76	1. Bundesliga	I	10th
1976–77	1. Bundesliga	I	9th
1977–78	1. Bundesliga	I	6th
1978–79	1. Bundesliga	I	13th
1979–80	1. Bundesliga	I	14th
1980–81	1. Bundesliga	I	12th
1981–82	1. Bundesliga	I	18th ↓
1982–83	2. Bundesliga	II	11th
1983–84	2. Bundesliga	II	3rd
1984–85	2. Bundesliga	II	13th
1985–86	2. Bundesliga	II	20th ↓
1986–87	Oberliga Nordrhein	III	2nd
1987–88	Oberliga Nordrhein	III	1st
1988–89	Oberliga Nordrhein	III	1st ↑
1989–90	2. Bundesliga	II	10th
1990–91	2. Bundesliga	II	2nd ↑
1991–92	1. Bundesliga	I	19th ↓
1992–93	2. Bundesliga	II	2nd ↑
1993–94	1. Bundesliga	I	9th
1994–95	1. Bundesliga	I	17th ↓
1995–96	2. Bundesliga	II	3rd ↑
1996–97	1. Bundesliga	I	9th
1997–98	1. Bundesliga	I	8th
1998–99	1. Bundesliga	I	8th
1999–2000	Bundesliga	I	18th ↓
2000–01	2. Bundesliga	II	11th
2001–02	2. Bundesliga	II	11th
2002–03	2. Bundesliga	II	8th
2003–04	2. Bundesliga	II	7th
2004–05	2. Bundesliga	II	2nd ↑
2005–06	Bundesliga	I	18th ↓
2006–07	2. Bundesliga	II	3rd ↑
2007–08	Bundesliga	I	18th ↓
2008–09	2. Bundesliga	II	6th
2009–10	2. Bundesliga	II	6th
2010–11	2. Bundesliga	II	8th
2011–12	2. Bundesliga	II	10th
2012–13	2. Bundesliga	II	11th ↓
2013–14	3. Liga	III	7th
2014–15	3. Liga	III	2nd ↑
2015–16	2. Bundesliga	II	16th ↓
2016–17	3. Liga	III	1st ↑
2017–18	2. Bundesliga	II	7th
2018–19	2. Bundesliga	II	18th ↓
2019–20	3. Liga	III	5th
2020–21	3. Liga	III	15th
2021–22	3. Liga	III	15th
2022–23	3. Liga	III	12th
2023–24	3. Liga	III	18th ↓
2024–25	Regionalliga West	IV	1st ↑
2025–26	3. Liga	III	4th
2026–27	3. Liga	III	

Key

↑ Promoted	↓ Relegated

== Honours ==
League

- Bundesliga
  - Runners-up: 1963–64
- 2. Oberliga West (II): 1950–51
- 3. Liga (III): 2016–17
- Oberliga Nordrhein (III): 1987–88, 1988–89
- Regionalliga West (IV): 2024–25

Cup

- DFB-Pokal
  - Finalists: 1965–66, 1974–75, 1997–98, 2010–11

International

- Intertoto Cup: 1974, 1977, 1978

Regional

- Bezirksliga Niederrhein (I): 1928–29, 1930–31, 1931–32
- Lower Rhine Cup (Tiers III–below): 1988–89, 2013–14, 2016–17, 2025–26

Amateur/Youth teams

- German amateur championship (III): 1986–87
- German Under 19 championship: 1971–72, 1976–77, 1977–78

== Current squad ==
As of 2 September 2026

Note: Flags indicate national team as defined under FIFA eligibility rules; some limited exceptions apply. Players may hold more than one non-FIFA nationality.

No.	Pos.	Nation	Player
1	GK	GER	Maximilian Braune
3	DF	DEN	Frederik Ørsøe Christensen
4	DF	GER	Martin Ens (on loan from SC Paderborn)
5	DF	GER	Tobias Fleckstein
6	MF	GER	Rasim Bulić (captain)
7	MF	GER	Jakob Bookjans
8	MF	SLO	Aljaž Casar
9	FW	GER	Lex-Tyger Lobinger
10	MF	GER	Christian Viet
11	FW	GER	Dominik Kother
14	MF	IRL	Conor Noß
17	MF	GER	Max Besuschkow
19	FW	NED	Ramien Safi

No.	Pos.	Nation	Player
20	DF	GER	Niklas Jessen
21	GK	GER	Laurenz Jennissen
23	MF	GER	Jan-Simon Symalla
25	MF	GER	Dennis Borkowski
26	FW	GER	Florian Krüger
27	DF	TUR	Can Coşkun
29	DF	GER	Joshua Bitter
33	GK	GER	Toni Stahl
34	MF	GER	Jannik Zahmel
37	MF	GER	Patrick Sussek
39	FW	GER	Peter Remmert (on loan from Schalke 04)
40	DF	GER	Ben Schlicke

== Manager history ==
- (Germany) Hermann Lindemann (1955–1957)
- (Germany) Rudi Gutendorf (1963–1965)
- (Germany) Wilhelm Schmidt (1965)
- (Germany) Hermann Eppenhoff (1965–1967)
- (Hungary) Gyula Lóránt (1967–1968)
- (Germany) Robert Gebhardt (1968–1970)
- (Germany) Rudolf Fassnacht (1970–1973)
- (Germany) Willibert Kremer (1973–1976)
- (Germany) Rolf Schafstall (1976)
- (Germany) Otto Knefler (1976–1977)
- (Germany) Carl-Heinz Rühl (1977–1978)
- (Germany) Rolf Schafstall (1978–1979)
- (Germany) Heinz Höher (1979–1980)
- (Germany) Friedhelm Wenzlaff (1980–1981)
- (Germany) Kuno Klötzer (1981–1982)
- (Germany) Siegfried Melzig (1982–1983)
- (Peru) Luis Zacarías (1983–1985)
- (Germany) Günter Preuß (1985)
- (Germany) Helmut Witte (1985–1986)
- (Germany) Friedhelm Vos (1986)
- (Germany) Detlef Pirsig (1986–1989)
- (Germany) Willibert Kremer (1989–1992)
- (Germany) Uwe Reinders (1992–1993)
- (Germany) Ewald Lienen (1993–1994)
- (Germany) Hannes Bongartz (1994–1996)
- (Germany) Friedhelm Funkel (1996–2000)
- (Germany) Josef Eichkorn (2000)
- (Germany) Wolfgang Frank (2000)
- (Germany) Josef Eichkorn (2000–2001)
- (Germany) Pierre Littbarski (2001–2002)
- (Germany) Bernard Dietz (2002–2003, caretaker)
- (Germany) Norbert Meier (2003–2005)
- (Germany) Heiko Scholz (2005, caretaker)
- (Germany) Jürgen Kohler (2006)
- (Germany) Heiko Scholz (2006, caretaker)
- (Germany) Rudi Bommer (2006–2008)
- (Germany) Heiko Scholz (2008, caretaker)
- (Germany) Peter Neururer (2008–2009)
- (Germany) Uwe Speidel (2009, caretaker)
- (Croatia) Milan Šašić (2009–2011)
- (Germany) Oliver Reck (2011–2012)
- (Bosnia and Herzegovina) Ivica Grlić (2012, caretaker)
- (Germany) Kosta Runjaić (2012–2013)
- (Germany) Karsten Baumann (2013–2014)
- (Switzerland) Gino Lettieri (2014–2015)
- (Bulgaria) Iliya Gruev (2015–2018)
- (Germany) Torsten Lieberknecht (2018–2020)
- (Switzerland) Gino Lettieri (2020–2021)
- (Germany) Uwe Schubert (2021, caretaker)
- (Bulgaria) Pavel Dochev (2021)
- (Germany) Uwe Schubert (2021, caretaker)
- (Germany) Hagen Schmidt (2021–2022)
- (Germany) Torsten Ziegner (2022–2023)
- (Germany) Engin Vural (2023)
- (Germany) Boris Schommers (2023–2024)
- (Germany) Uwe Schubert (2024, caretaker)
- (Germany) Dietmar Hirsch (2024–)

== Club culture ==
The club mascot is a Zebra, coming from the club nickname 'die Zebras' – it is named 'Ennatz', after the nickname for club legend Bernard Dietz.

As of 2022, the club has 8,638 members.

Tatort, a popular crime series in Germany, features an episode entitled Zweierlei Blut (lit. 'Blood of Two Kinds') which deals with a murder in the MSV Duisburg hooligan scene. In one scene, Inspector Horst Schimanski is beaten to a pulp and dragged naked into the centre circle of the Wedaustadion.
