= 2023–24 MSV Duisburg season =

MSV Duisburg
2023–24 season
- Manager: Torsten Ziegner (until 16 September 2023); Engin Vural (18 September 2023 – 9 October 2023); Boris Schommers (9 October 2023 – 23 April 2024); Uwe Schubert (23 April 2024 – 30 June 2024)
- Stadium: MSV-Arena
- 3. Liga: 18th
- Lower Rhine Cup: Round 2
- Top goalscorer: League: Alexander Esswein (5); All: Alexander Esswein (6)
- Highest home attendance: 25,845 (vs. Essen)
- Lowest home attendance: 8,189 (vs. Ingolstadt)
- Average home league attendance: 12,113
- Biggest win: 7–0 vs Vohwinkel
- Biggest defeat: 0–3 vs Munich
Home colours	Away colours	Third colours

The 2023–24 MSV Duisburg season was the 124th season in the club's football history. In 2023–24 the club played in the 3. Liga, the third tier of German football alongside the Lower Rhine Cup.

Duisburg had a disastrous campaign, with their longest unbeaten run was only three matches and they had only one away win, against SC Verl on 10 February 2024. On 6 May 2024, following Waldhof Mannheim’s 1–1 draw against Ingolstadt, Duisburg were relegated to the Regionalliga for the first time in their history.

== Team ==
Note: Flags indicate national team as defined under FIFA eligibility rules; some limited exceptions apply. Players may hold more than one non-FIFA nationality.

No.	Pos.	Nation	Player
1	GK	GER	Vincent Müller
2	DF	GER	Baran Mogultay
4	DF	GER	Marvin Senger
5	MF	USA	Santiago Castañeda
6	MF	GER	Marvin Bakalorz
7	MF	GER	Kolja Pusch
8	MF	GER	Hamza Anhari
9	MF	GER	Alaa Bakir
10	MF	GER	Thomas Pledl
11	DF	GER	Niklas Kölle
13	MF	GER	Erik Zenga
14	FW	GER	Pascal Köpke
15	DF	GER	Tobias Fleckstein
16	MF	GER	Jonas Michelbrink
17	DF	GER	Marvin Knoll
18	MF	GER	Caspar Jander

No.	Pos.	Nation	Player
19	FW	GER	Chinedu Ekene
20	MF	GER	Robin Müller
21	DF	VEN	Rolf Feltscher
22	MF	GER	Tim Köther (on loan from Heidenheim)
23	MF	GER	Niclas Stierlin
24	GK	GER	Maximilian Braune
26	DF	GER	Sebastian Mai (captain)
29	DF	GER	Joshua Bitter
30	GK	GER	Dennis Smarsch
31	FW	GER	Benjamin Girth
32	DF	GER	Batuhan Yavuz
33	FW	GER	Daniel Ginczek
36	FW	GER	Kaan İnanoğlu
39	MF	GER	Ahmet Engin
40	FW	GER	Alexander Esswein

== Transfers ==
=== In ===
Date	Pos.	Name	From	Type	Ref.
1 July 2023	MF	(United States) Santiago Castañeda	(United States) Tampa Bay Rowdies	Free transfer	
1 July 2023	MF	(Germany) Thomas Pledl	Waldhof Mannheim	Free transfer	
3 July 2023	FW	(Germany) Pascal Köpke	1. FC Nürnberg	Free transfer	
4 July 2023	GK	(Germany) Dennis Smarsch	FC St. Pauli	Free transfer	
8 August 2023	MF	(Germany) Robin Müller	FC St. Pauli II	Free transfer	
15 August 2023	MF	(Germany) Alexander Esswein	SV Sandhausen	Free transfer	
30 August 2023	MF	(Germany) Tim Köther	1. FC Heidenheim	Loan	
8 January 2024	FW	(Germany) Daniel Ginczek	Fortuna Düsseldorf	Free transfer	
8 January 2024	MF	(Germany) Ahmet Engin		Free transfer	
31 January 2024	MF	(Germany) Erik Zenga		Free transfer	

=== Out ===
Date	Pos.	Name	To	Type	Ref.
1 July 2023	DF	(Germany) Vincent Gembalies	SC Paderborn II	Mutual consent	
1 July 2023	DF	(Germany) Leroy Kwadwo	1860 Munich	End of contract	
1 July 2023	MF	(Germany) Marvin Ajani	Hallescher FC	End of contract	
1 July 2023	MF	(Germany) Marlon Frey	1860 Munich	End of contract	
1 July 2023	MF	(Germany) Moritz Stoppelkamp	Rot-Weiß Oberhausen	End of contract	
1 July 2023	FW	(Morocco) Aziz Bouhaddouz	FSV Frankfurt	End of contract	
7 July 2023	GK	(Germany) Lukas Raeder	Retired		
14 July 2023	FW	(Germany) Julian Hettwer	Borussia Dortmund II	Transfer	
25 January 2024	FW	(Germany) Phillip König	1. FC Bocholt	Mutual consent	

=== New contracts ===
Date	Pos.	Name	Contract length	Contract end	Ref.
21 June 2023	MF	Kolja Pusch	1-year	2024	
23 June 2023	FW	Benjamin Girth	2-year	2025	
5 January 2024	DF	Batuhan Yavuz	2-year	2026	
19 January 2024	GK	Maximilian Braune	2-year	2026	

== Friendly matches ==
30 June 2023 1	SV Duissern	1–14	MSV Duisburg	Duisburg
19:00	Eisenmann 76'	Report	Pusch 15', 31', 35'; Pledl 16', 32'; König 17', 31'; Michelbrink 22'; Ekene 47', 58', 60', 80'; Girth 54'; Bakir 61'	Stadium: Sportanlage SV Duissern; Attendance: 2,023; Referee: Fasihullah Habibi

2 July 2023 2	MSV Duisburg	26–0	DJK Lösort Meiderich	Duisburg
14:00	Pledl 10', 13', 37', 54', 74'; Girth 11'; Pusch 12', 18', 28'; Mogultay 22'; König 29'; Jander 34', 41'; Bitter 39'; Hettwer 45', 48'; Ekene 47', 52', 62'; 59' (o.g.); Fleckstein 60'; Bakir 66', 73', 74'; Anhari 72'; Michelbrink 86'	Report		Stadium: Westender Straße; Attendance: 1,000; Referee: Jonah Njie

7 July 2023 3	1. FC Bocholt	1–3	MSV Duisburg	Bocholt
19:00	Fakhro 64' (pen.)	Report	Feltscher 68'; Bakalorz 72'; Anhari 90'	Stadium: Gigaset Arena; Attendance: 900; Referee: Cedric Gottschalk

8 July 2023 4	Hamborn 07	0–4	MSV Duisburg	Duisburg
15:00		Report	Hettwer 22'; König 76', 83', 90+1'	Stadium: Containerbau MiRO Sportarena; Attendance: 900; Referee: Felix May

14 July 2023 5	Fortuna Köln	0–1	MSV Duisburg	Brühl
19:00		Report	Kölle 6'	Stadium: Schloßparkstadion; Attendance: 630; Referee: Leonidas Exuzidis

19 July 2023 6	Hannover 96	3–0	MSV Duisburg	Hanover
15:00	Börner 19'; Teuchert 22'; Nielsen 51'	Report		Stadium: Erika-Fisch-Stadion; Attendance: 0
Note: The match was played behind closed doors.

21 July 2023 7	Lokomotive Leipzig	1–0	MSV Duisburg	Heiligenstadt
17:00	Grym 12'	Report		Stadium: Stadion Gesundbrunnen; Attendance: 400; Referee: Chris Rauschenberg

29 July 2023 8	MSV Duisburg (Germany)	2–1	(Netherlands) De Graafschap	Duisburg
14:00	Kölle 6'; Bakir 74'	Report	Kaak 14'	Stadium: PCC-Stadion; Attendance: 2,253; Referee: Robert Kampka

11 August 2023 9	SSVg Velbert	0–5	MSV Duisburg	Velbert
19:00		Report	18' (o.g.); Pledl 26'; Girth 27', 31'; Michelbrink 67'	Stadium: IMS Arena; Attendance: 400; Referee: Cedric Gottschalk

9 September 2023 10	Mainz 05	2–0	MSV Duisburg	Mainz
15:30	Krauß 4' (pen.), 68' (pen.)			Stadium: Bruchwegstadion; Referee: Tom Bauer

17 November 2023 11	MSV Duisburg	2–1	VfL Osnabrück	Duisburg
15:30	Pledl 27'; Stierlin 58'	Report	Verhoek 78'	Stadium: Westender Straße; Attendance: 0 Referee: Lars Aarts
Note: The match was played behind closed doors.

8 January 2024 12	MSV Duisburg (Germany)	6–1	(Netherlands) FC Eindhoven	Duisburg
12:00	Fleckstein 5'; Kölle 12'; 23' (o.g.); Inanoglu 55'; Bakir 66' (pen.), 78'	Report	Limouri 88'	Stadium: Westender Straße; Attendance: 0 Referee: Martin Ulankiewicz
Note: The match was played behind closed doors.

13 January 2024 13	MSV Duisburg	3–0	Borussia Mönchengladbach II	Duisburg
14:00	Ginczek 25'; Esswein 57'; Fleckstein 76'	Report		Stadium: Westender Straße
Note: The match was played behind closed doors.

23 March 2024 14	MSV Duisburg	1–0	Wuppertaler SV	Duisburg
	Stierlin 99'	Report		Stadium: Westender Straße
Note: The match was played behind closed doors and over 4x30 minutes.

== Competitions ==
Times from 1 July to 28 October 2023 and from 31 March to 30 June 2024 are UTC+2, from 29 October 2023 to 30 March 2023 UTC+1.

=== Overview ===
Competition	First match	Last match	Starting round	Final position	Record							
Competition	First match	Last match	Starting round	Final position	Pld	W	D	L	GF	GA	GD	Win %
3. Liga	6 August 2023	18 May 2024	Matchday 1	18th place	38	8	10	20	41	65	−24	21.05
Lower Rhine Cup	30 August 2023	11 October 2023	Round 1	Round 2	2	1	0	1	7	1	+6	50.00
Total					40	9	10	21	48	66	−18	22.50

Last updated: 18 May 2024
Source: Soccerway

=== 3. Liga ===
==== League table ====
Pos	Team	Pld	W	D	L	GF	GA	GD	Pts	Promotion, qualification or relegation
16	Waldhof Mannheim	38	11	10	17	51	60	−9	43	
17	Hallescher FC (R)	38	11	7	20	50	68	−18	40	Relegation to Regionalliga
18	MSV Duisburg (R)	38	8	10	20	41	65	−24	34	Relegation to Regionalliga
19	VfB Lübeck (R)	38	6	14	18	37	77	−40	32	Relegation to Regionalliga
20	SC Freiburg II (Note: Reserve teams are ineligible for promotion or DFB-Pokal qualification.) (R)	38	8	6	24	37	64	−27	30	Relegation to Regionalliga

Source: DFB
Rules for classification: 1) Points; 2) Goal difference; 3) Goals scored; 4) Head-to-head results; 5) Head-to-head away goals scored; 6) Away goals scored; 7) Play-off.
(R) Relegated

==== Results summary ====
Overall								Home						Away					
Pld	W	D	L	GF	GA	GD	Pts	W	D	L	GF	GA	GD	W	D	L	GF	GA	GD
38	8	10	20	41	63	−22	34	7	4	8	26	27	−1	1	6	12	15	36	−21

Last updated: 18 May 2024.
Source: DFB

==== Results by round ====
Round	1	2	3	4	5	6	7	8	9	10	11	12	13	14	15	16	17	18	19	20	21	22	23	24	25	26	27	28	29	30	31	32	33	34	35	36	37	38
Ground	A	H	A	H	A	H	A	A	H	H	H	H	A	H	A	A	H	A	H	H	A	H	A	H	A	H	A	H	A	H	A	A	H	A	H	A	H	A
Result	D	L	D	D	L	L	L	L	D	W	L	L	D	L	L	D	W	D	L	W	L	L	D	L	W	W	L	W	L	W	L	L	D	L	W	L	D	L
Position	7	18	18	19	19	20	20	20	20	20	20	19	19	20	20	19	19	19	19	19	19	19	19	19	19	18	18	18	18	18	18	18	18	18	18	18	18	18

Source: DFB
A = Away; H = Home; W = Win; D = Draw; L = Loss

==== Matches ====
6 August 2023 1	SC Freiburg II	1–1	MSV Duisburg	Freiburg
16:30	Fahrner 46'	Report	Senger 28'	Stadium: Dreisamstadion; Attendance: 2,887; Referee: Christian Ballweg

19 August 2023 2	MSV Duisburg	0–3	1860 Munich	Duisburg
14:00		Report	Starke 32'; Zwarts 53', 87'	Stadium: MSV-Arena; Attendance: 14,142; Referee: Martin Petersen

22 August 2023 3	Hallescher FC	1–1	MSV Duisburg	Halle
19:00	Baumann 10'	Report	Mai 52'	Stadium: Leuna Chemie Stadion; Attendance: 6,869; Referee: Timo Gansloweit

25 August 2023 4	MSV Duisburg	1–1	SSV Ulm	Duisburg
19:00	Mai 24'	Report	Allgeier 34'	Stadium: MSV-Arena; Attendance: 10,214; Referee: Tobias Wittmann

3 September 2023 5	Jahn Regensburg	2–1	MSV Duisburg	Regensburg
16:30	Kother 30'; Ganaus 76'	Report	Stierlin 33'	Stadium: Jahnstadion Regensburg; Attendance: 8,630; Referee: Nico Fuchs

15 September 2023 6	MSV Duisburg	2–3	SC Verl	Duisburg
19:00	Bitter 9'; Kother 13'	Report	Lokotsch 45'; Corboz 56', 90+3'	Stadium: MSV-Arena; Attendance: 10,447; Referee: Luca Jürgensen

23 September 2023 7	Viktoria Köln	2–0	MSV Duisburg	Cologne
14:00	Marseiler 52'; Henning 87'	Report		Stadium: Sportpark Höhenberg; Attendance: 5,111; Referee: Eric Weisbach

27 September 2023 8	Borussia Dortmund II	1–0	MSV Duisburg	Dortmund
19:00	Besong 14'	Report		Stadium: Stadion Rote Erde; Attendance: 3,913; Referee: Robert Kampka
Note: The match, originally scheduled for 3 to 4 October 2023, was moved forward due to the Champions League game of Dortmund's first team.

30 September 2023 9	MSV Duisburg	0–0	Preußen Münster	Duisburg
14:00		Report		Stadium: MSV-Arena; Attendance: 12,928; Referee: Timo Gansloweit

7 October 2023 10	MSV Duisburg	1–0	SpVgg Unterhaching	Duisburg
14:00	Jander 69'	Report		Stadium: MSV-Arena; Attendance: 9,513; Referee: Martin Speckner

21 October 2023 11	MSV Duisburg	0–1	Arminia Bielefeld	Duisburg
16:30		Report	Klos 38'	Stadium: MSV-Arena; Attendance: 14,446; Referee: Patrick Alt

28 October 2023 12	MSV Duisburg	1–2	Rot-Weiss Essen	Duisburg
14:00	Šapina 89' (o.g.)	Report	Obuz 63'; Kourouma 90+3'	Stadium: MSV-Arena; Attendance: 25,845; Referee: Florian Lechner

5 November 2023 13	Waldhof Mannheim	0–0	MSV Duisburg	Mannheim
13:30		Report		Stadium: Carl-Benz-Stadion; Attendance: 7,728; Referee: Mario Hildenbrand

11 November 2023 14	MSV Duisburg	1–2	FC Ingolstadt	Duisburg
14:00	Esswein 80' (pen.)	Report	Kopacz 56'; Fröde 70'	Stadium: MSV-Arena; Attendance: 8,189; Referee: Tom Bauer

25 November 2023 15	SV Sandhausen	2–0	MSV Duisburg	Sandhausen
14:00	Otto 34'; Mai 43' (o.g.)	Report		Stadium: BWT-Stadion am Hardtwald; Attendance: 4,013; Referee: Cristian Ballweg

29 November 2023 16	1. FC Saarbrücken	0–0	MSV Duisburg	Saarbrücken
19:00		Report		Stadium: Ludwigsparkstadion; Attendance: 9,595; Referee: Timon Schulz
Note: The match, originally scheduled for 15 October 2023, was postponed, because Caspar Jander was called up for the U-20 national team and would miss the match.

2 December 2023 17	MSV Duisburg	1–0	VfB Lübeck	Duisburg
14:00	Castañeda 90+2'	Report		Stadium: MSV-Arena; Attendance: 8,255; Referee: Felix Weller

9 December 2023 18	Erzgebirge Aue	1–1	MSV Duisburg	Aue-Bad Schlema
16:30	Bär 29'	Report	Kölle 61'	Stadium: Erzgebirgsstadion; Attendance: 7,505; Referee: Florian Exner

17 December 2023 19	MSV Duisburg	2–4	Dynamo Dresden	Duisburg
13:30	Pusch 45+2'; Müller 87'	Report	Will 5'; Kutschke 54'; Zimmerschied 56'; Meißner 83'	Stadium: MSV-Arena; Attendance: 12,091; Referee: Sören Storks

20 December 2023 20	MSV Duisburg	4–2	SC Freiburg II	Duisburg
19:00	Mai 9'; Kölle 12', 45+2'; Knoll 70'	Report	Sturm 44'; Al Ghaddioui 64'	Stadium: MSV-Arena; Attendance: 9,243; Referee: Lukas Benen

20 January 2024 21	1860 Munich	4–1	MSV Duisburg	Munich
16:30	Guttau 16'; Schröter 24', 53'; Lakenmacher 60'	Report	Bakir 72'	Stadium: Grünwalder Stadion; Attendance: 15,000; Referee: Eric Weisbach

23 January 2024 22	MSV Duisburg	2–3	Hallescher FC	Duisburg
19:00	Engin 15', 32'	Report	Gayret 27'; Baumann 76'; Nietfeld 88'	Stadium: MSV-Arena; Attendance: 8,809; Referee: Luca Jürgensen

27 January 2024 23	SSV Ulm	2–2	MSV Duisburg	Ulm
14:00	Gaal 25'; Kastanaras 61'	Report	Köther 82'; Müller 90+2'	Stadium: Donaustadion; Attendance: 3,777; Referee: Riem Hussein

4 February 2024 24	MSV Duisburg	0–1	Jahn Regensburg	Duisburg
19:30		Report	Huth 36'	Stadium: MSV-Arena; Attendance: 9,117; Referee: Jost Steenken

10 February 2024 25	SC Verl	1–3	MSV Duisburg	Verl
14:00	Lokotsch 20'	Report	Ginczek 32', 64'; Müller 90+5'	Stadium: Sportclub Arena; Attendance: 3,003; Referee: Assad Nouhoum

17 February 2024 26	MSV Duisburg	1–0	Viktoria Köln	Duisburg
14:00	Kölle 40'	Report		Stadium: MSV-Arena; Attendance: 11,426; Referee: Fabienne Michel

23 February 2024 27	Preußen Münster	3–1	MSV Duisburg	Münster
19:00	Bouchama 46'; Wegkamp 74', 90+5'	Report	Bakir 81'	Stadium: Preußenstadion; Attendance: 11,744; Referee: Robert Kampka

3 March 2024 28	MSV Duisburg	2–1	Borussia Dortmund II	Duisburg
19:30	Esswein 12'; Pledl 17'	Report	Papadopoulos 75'	Stadium: MSV-Arena; Attendance: 13,114; Referee: Felix Prigan

10 March 2024 29	SpVgg Unterhaching	1–0	MSV Duisburg	Unterhaching
13:30	Maier 64'	Report		Stadium: Sportpark Unterhaching; Attendance: 6,850; Referee: Patrick Kessel

16 March 2024 30	MSV Duisburg	2–0	1. FC Saarbrücken	Duisburg
14:00	Kölle 23'; Pusch 60'	Report		Stadium: MSV-Arena; Attendance: 14,063; Referee: Lukas Benen

31 March 2024 31	Arminia Bielefeld	2–0	MSV Duisburg	Bielefeld
19:30	Schneider 27'; Klos 43'	Report		Stadium: Schüco-Arena; Attendance: 23,996; Referee: Robert Kampka

7 April 2024 32	Rot-Weiss Essen	4–1	MSV Duisburg	Essen
16:30	Šapina 45+2'; Brumme 57', 90+4'; Doumbouya 72' (pen.)	Report	Esswein 37'	Stadium: Stadion an der Hafenstraße; Attendance: 19,962; Referee: Max Burda

12 April 2024 33	MSV Duisburg	1–1	Waldhof Mannheim	Duisburg
19:00	Boyd 32' (o.g.)	Report	Fleckstein 69' (o.g.)	Stadium: MSV-Arena; Attendance: 16,009; Referee: Martin Petersen

20 April 2024 34	FC Ingolstadt	2–0	MSV Duisburg	Ingolstadt
16:30	Mause 7'; Malone 76'	Report		Stadium: Audi Sportpark; Attendance: 10,490; Referee: Marc Philip Eckermann

26 April 2024 35	MSV Duisburg	3–1	SV Sandhausen	Duisburg
14:00	Esswein 29' (pen.); Girth 32'; Bitter 82'	Report	Maciejewski 73'	Stadium: MSV-Arena; Attendance: 10,789; Referee: Alexander Sather

3 May 2024 36	VfB Lübeck	5–3	MSV Duisburg	Lübeck
19:00	Beleme 45', 72'; Drinkuth 68'; Lehnfeld 77'; Gözüsirin 90+3' (pen.)	Report	Girth 18', 48'; Castañeda 56'	Stadium: Stadion an der Lohmühle; Attendance: 5,097; Referee: Mario Hildenbrand

12 May 2024 37	MSV Duisburg	2–2	Erzgebirge Aue	Duisburg
13:30	Esswein 57'; Engin 64' (pen.)	Report	Seitz 43'; Stefaniak 61'	Stadium: MSV-Arena; Attendance: 11,509; Referee: Assad Nouhoum

18 May 2024 38	Dynamo Dresden	4–0	MSV Duisburg	Dresden
13:30	Will 14'; Lemmer 15', 51'; Castañeda 38' (o.g.)	Report		Stadium: Rudolf-Harbig-Stadion; Attendance: 31,189; Referee: Eric Weisbach

=== Lower Rhine Cup ===
30 August 2023 Round 1	FSV Vohwinkel	0–7	MSV Duisburg	Duisburg
19:30		Report	Köpke 8', 42'; Stierlin 27'; Esswein 35'; Burghard 49' (o.g.); Stolle 66' (o.g.); Knoll 70'	Stadium: PCC-Stadion; Attendance: 1,200; Referee: Marten Kaufels

11 October 2023 Round 2	KFC Uerdingen	1–0 (a.e.t.)	MSV Duisburg	Krefeld
19:30	Simoes-Ribeiro 107'	Report		Stadium: Grotenburg-Stadion; Attendance: 2,500; Referee: Robin Braun

== Statistics ==
=== Squad statistics ===
No.	Pos	Nat	Player	Total		3. Liga		Lower Rhine Cup	
No.	Pos	Nat	Player	Apps	Goals	Apps	Goals	Apps	Goals
1	GK	(Germany) GER	Vincent Müller	34	0	34	0	0	0
2	DF	(Germany) GER	Baran Moğultay	16	0	15	0	1	0
4	DF	(Germany) GER	Marvin Senger	19	1	18	1	1	0
5	MF	(United States) USA	Santiago Castañeda	33	2	31	2	2	0
6	MF	(Germany) GER	Marvin Bakalorz	15	0	14	0	1	0
7	MF	(Germany) GER	Kolja Pusch	21	2	19	2	2	0
8	MF	(Morocco) MAR	Hamza Anhari	11	0	10	0	1	0
9	MF	(Germany) GER	Alaa Bakir	18	2	16	2	2	0
10	MF	(Germany) GER	Thomas Pledl	29	1	29	1	0	0
11	DF	(Germany) GER	Niklas Kölle	26	1	26	1	0	0
13	MF	(Germany) GER	Erik Zenga	10	0	10	0	0	0
14	FW	(Germany) GER	Pascal Köpke	9	2	7	0	2	2
15	DF	(Germany) GER	Tobias Fleckstein	29	0	27	0	2	0
16	MF	(Germany) GER	Jonas Michelbrink	26	0	26	0	0	0
17	DF	(Germany) GER	Marvin Knoll	33	2	31	1	2	1
18	MF	(Germany) GER	Caspar Jander	22	1	21	1	1	0
19	FW	(Germany) GER	Chinedu Ekene	11	0	11	0	0	0
20	MF	(Germany) GER	Robin Müller	28	3	27	3	1	0
21	DF	(Venezuela) VEN	Rolf Feltscher	25	0	24	0	1	0
22	MF	(Germany) GER	Tim Köther	29	1	27	1	2	0
23	MF	(Germany) GER	Niclas Stierlin	18	2	17	1	1	1
24	GK	(Germany) GER	Maximilian Braune	6	0	5	0	1	0
26	DF	(Germany) GER	Sebastian Mai	20	4	19	4	1	0
27	FW	(Germany) GER	Phillip König	8	0	7	0	1	0
29	DF	(Germany) GER	Joshua Bitter	27	2	26	2	1	0
30	GK	(Germany) GER	Dennis Smarsch	1	0	0	0	1	0
31	FW	(Germany) GER	Benjamin Girth	19	3	17	3	2	0
32	MF	(Germany) GER	Batuhan Yavuz	1	0	0	0	1	0
33	FW	(Germany) GER	Daniel Ginczek	14	2	14	2	0	0
36	FW	(Germany) GER	Kaan İnanoğlu	6	0	6	0	0	0
37	MF	(Germany) GER	Jan-Simon Symalla	1	0	1	0	0	0
39	MF	(Germany) GER	Ahmet Engin	18	3	18	3	0	0
40	MF	(Germany) GER	Alexander Esswein	33	6	31	5	2	1

Last updated: 18 May 2024
Source: Soccerway

=== Goals ===
As of 18 May 2024

Rank	Player	3. Liga	LR Cup	Total
1	(Germany) Alexander Esswein	5	1	6
2	(Germany) Sebastian Mai	4	0	4
3	(Germany) Ahmet Engin	3	0	3
3	(Germany) Benjamin Girth	3	0	3
3	(Germany) Niklas Kölle	3	0	3
3	(Germany) Robin Müller	3	0	3
7	(Germany) Alaa Bakir	2	0	2
7	(Germany) Joshua Bitter	2	0	2
7	(Germany) Daniel Ginczek	2	0	2
7	(Germany) Marvin Knoll	1	1	2
7	(Germany) Pascal Köpke	0	2	2
7	(Germany) Kolja Pusch	2	0	2
7	(Germany) Niclas Stierlin	1	1	2
14	(United States) Santiago Castañeda	1	0	1
14	(Germany) Caspar Jander	1	0	1
14	(Germany) Marvin Knoll	1	0	1
14	(Germany) Tim Köther	1	0	1
14	(Germany) Thomas Pledl	1	0	1
14	(Germany) Marvin Senger	1	0	1
14	(Germany) Niclas Stierlin	1	0	1
Own goals		2	2	4
Total		41	7	48

=== Clean sheets ===
As of 18 May 2024

Rank	Player	3. Liga	LR Cup	Total
1	(Germany) Vincent Müller	7	0	7
2	(Germany) Dennis Smarsch	0	1	1
3	(Germany) Maximilian Braune	0	0	0
Total		7	1	8

=== Disciplinary record ===
N	P	Nat.	Name	3. Liga			LR Cup			Total			Notes
N	P	Nat.	Name	Yellow card	Second yellow card	Red card	Yellow card	Second yellow card	Red card	Yellow card	Second yellow card	Red card	Notes
29	DF	(Germany)	Joshua Bitter	6		2				6		2	
26	DF	(Germany)	Sebastian Mai	5	1					5	1		
5	MF	(United States)	Santiago Castañeda	10						10			
40	MF	(Germany)	Alexander Esswein	7						7			
16	MF	(Germany)	Jonas Michelbrink	6						6			
18	MF	(Germany)	Caspar Jander	5			1			6			
1	GK	(Germany)	Vincent Müller	5						5			
17	MF	(Germany)	Marvin Knoll	5						5			
4	DF	(Germany)	Marvin Senger	4						4			
7	MF	(Germany)	Kolja Pusch	4						4			
9	MF	(Germany)	Alaa Bakir	4						4			
10	MF	(Germany)	Thomas Pledl	4						4			
23	MF	(Germany)	Niclas Stierlin	4						4			
2	DF	(Germany)	Baran Moğultay	3						3			
15	DF	(Germany)	Tobias Fleckstein	3						3			
20	MF	(Germany)	Robin Müller	3						3			
31	FW	(Germany)	Benjamin Girth	2			1			3			
6	MF	(Germany)	Marvin Bakalorz	2						2			
19	MF	(Germany)	Chinedu Ekene	2						2			
22	MF	(Germany)	Tim Köther	2						2			
39	MF	(Germany)	Ahmet Engin	2						2			
11	DF	(Germany)	Niklas Kölle	1						1			
13	MF	(Germany)	Erik Zenga	1						1			
21	DF	(Venezuela)	Rolf Feltscher	1						1			
27	FW	(Germany)	Phillip König				1			1			
33	FW	(Germany)	Daniel Ginczek	1						1			

Last updated: 18 May 2024
Source: Soccerway
Only competitive matches
(yellow card) = Number of bookings; (second yellow card) = Number of sending offs after a second yellow card; (red card) = Number of sending offs by a direct red card.
