= 2022–23 MSV Duisburg season =

MSV Duisburg
2022–23 season
- Manager: Torsten Ziegner
- Stadium: MSV-Arena
- 3. Liga: 12th
- Lower Rhine Cup: Round 2
- Top goalscorer: League: Moritz Stoppelkamp (7); All: Benjamin Girth; Kolja Pusch; Moritz Stoppelkamp (7)
- Highest home attendance: 28,200 (vs Essen)
- Lowest home attendance: 9,077 (vs Köln)
- Average home league attendance: 11,778
- Biggest win: Duisburg 4–0 Zwickau
- Biggest defeat: Duisburg 0–5 Dortmund II
Home colours	Away colours	Third colours

The 2022–23 MSV Duisburg season was the 123rd season in the club's football history. In 2022–23 the club played in the 3. Liga, the third tier of German football alongside the Lower Rhine Cup.

== Team ==
As of 2 September 2026

Note: Flags indicate national team as defined under FIFA eligibility rules; some limited exceptions apply. Players may hold more than one non-FIFA nationality.

No.	Pos.	Nation	Player
1	GK	GER	Maximilian Braune
3	DF	DEN	Frederik Ørsøe Christensen
4	DF	GER	Martin Ens (on loan from SC Paderborn)
5	DF	GER	Tobias Fleckstein
6	MF	GER	Rasim Bulić (captain)
7	MF	GER	Jakob Bookjans
8	MF	SLO	Aljaž Casar
9	FW	GER	Lex-Tyger Lobinger
10	MF	GER	Christian Viet
11	FW	GER	Dominik Kother
14	MF	IRL	Conor Noß
17	MF	GER	Max Besuschkow
19	FW	NED	Ramien Safi

No.	Pos.	Nation	Player
20	DF	GER	Niklas Jessen
21	GK	GER	Laurenz Jennissen
23	MF	GER	Jan-Simon Symalla
25	MF	GER	Dennis Borkowski
26	FW	GER	Florian Krüger
27	DF	TUR	Can Coşkun
29	DF	GER	Joshua Bitter
33	GK	GER	Toni Stahl
34	MF	GER	Jannik Zahmel
37	MF	GER	Patrick Sussek
39	FW	GER	Peter Remmert (on loan from Schalke 04)
40	DF	GER	Ben Schlicke

== Transfers ==
=== In ===
Date	Pos.	Name	From	Type	Ref.
1 July 2022	GK	(Germany) Vincent Müller	(Netherlands) PSV	Free transfer	
1 July 2022	DF	(Germany) Joshua Bitter	Energie Cottbus	Free transfer	
1 July 2022	DF	(Germany) Niklas Kölle	1899 Hoffenheim II	Free transfer	
1 July 2022	DF	(Germany) Sebastian Mai	Dynamo Dresden	Free transfer	
1 July 2022	DF	(Germany) Marvin Senger	FC St. Pauli	Free transfer	
1 July 2022	FW	(Germany) Phillip König	Holstein Kiel II	Free transfer	
19 July 2022	GK	(Germany) Lukas Raeder	(Bulgaria) Lokomotiv Plovdiv	Free transfer	
21 July 2022	FW	(Germany) Gordon Wild	Free agent	Free transfer	
24 August 2022	FW	(Germany) Benjamin Girth	Eintracht Braunschweig	Free transfer	
26 August 2022	MF	(Germany) Jonas Michelbrink	Hertha BSC	Free transfer	

=== Out ===
Date	Pos.	Name	To	Type	Ref.
1 July 2022	GK	(Belgium) Jo Coppens	(Belgium) Sint-Truidense	End of contract	
1 July 2022	GK	(Germany) Roman Schabbing	Preußen Münster	End of contract	
1 July 2022	GK	(Germany) Leo Weinkauf	Hannover 96	End of loan	
1 July 2022	DF	(Germany) Niko Bretschneider	(Latvia) FK Auda	End of contract	
1 July 2022	DF	(Germany) Oliver Steurer	VfB Oldenburg	End of contract	
1 July 2022	DF	(Bulgaria) Stefan Velkov	(Denmark) Vejle Boldklub	End of contract	
1 July 2022	DF	(Germany) Dominic Volkmer		End of contract	
1 July 2022	FW	(Switzerland) Orhan Ademi	(Romania) UTA Arad	End of contract	
1 July 2022	FW	(Germany) John Yeboah	(Poland) Śląsk Wrocław	End of loan	
19 August 2022	MF	(Germany) Rudolf Ndualu	SV Babelsberg	Free transfer	
29 January 2023	FW	(Germany) Gordon Wild	1. FC Bocholt	Mutual consent	

=== New contracts ===
Date	Pos.	Name	Contract length	Contract end	Ref.
16 May 2022	DF	Tobias Fleckstein	3-year	2025	
22 May 2022	MF	Moritz Stoppelkamp	1-year	2023	

== Friendly matches ==
19 June 2022 1	MTV Union Hamborn	1–13	MSV Duisburg	Duisburg
16:00	Amadi 19'	Report	Knoll 15'; Ekene 17', 42' (pen.); Pusch 25'; Wild 47', 82'; Ndualu 52', 54'; Hettwer 56'; Bouhaddouz 65', 66', 73'; Frey 90' (pen.)	Stadium: Bezirkssportanlage Warbruckstraße; Attendance: 1,500; Referee: Martin Ulankiewicz

25 June 2022 2	Hannover 96	5–2	MSV Duisburg	Hanover
13:00	Börner 30'; Weydandt 42'; Teuchert 69' (pen.); Stolze 89'; Tresoldi 116'	Report	Stoppelkamp 28'; Seaton 118'	Stadium: Eilenriedestadion; Attendance: 1,300; Referee: Robert Schröder
Note: The match was played over 2x60 minutes.

1 July 2022 3	MSV Duisburg	1–1	Preußen Münster	Duisburg
18:00	Hettwer 115'	Report	Ghindovean 107'	Stadium: Westender Straße; Referee: Thibaut Scheer
Note: The match was played over 2x60 minutes.

8 July 2022 4	1. FC Düren	4–2	MSV Duisburg	Düren
18:30	Brašnić 3', 61'; Stromberg 81'; Kühnel 89'	Report	Bouhaddouz 60'; Wild 79'	Stadium: Westkampfbahn; Attendance: 1,197; Referee: David-Markus Koj

9 July 2022 5	Bayer Leverkusen	6–1	MSV Duisburg	Velbert
15:30	Bravo 3', 49', 50'; Aourir 9'; Fosu-Mensah 22'; Sinkgraven 44'	Report	Hettwer 41'	Stadium: IMS Arena; Attendance: 2,011; Referee: Martin Thomsen

17 July 2022 6	Borussia Mönchengladbach	1–0	MSV Duisburg	Duisburg
16:00	Mai 13' (o.g.)	Report		Stadium: MSV-Arena; Attendance: 6,022; Referee: Thibaut Scheer
Note: The match was played over 45 minutes.

17 July 2022 7	MSV Duisburg (Germany)	1–1	(Spain) Athletic Bilbao	Duisburg
18:00	Serrano 20'	Report	Ajani 35'	Stadium: MSV-Arena; Attendance: 6,022; Referee: Luca Marx
Note: The match was played over 45 minutes.

Cancelled 8	VfL Tönisberg	v	MSV Duisburg
Note: The match was cancelled due to a construction site at the pitch in Tönisberg.

29 July 2022 9	MSV Duisburg	4–1	SV Lippstadt	Duisburg
19:00	Ekene 24', 73'; Stoppelkamp 69'; Bakir 83'	Report	Delifer 63'	Stadium: Westender Straße; Attendance: 500; Referee: Jan Peter Weßels

16 December 2022 10	MSV Duisburg (Germany)	2–1	(Netherlands) SBV Vitesse	Duisburg
14:00	Girth 29'; Stoppelkamp 58'	Report	Białek 38'	Stadium: Westender Straße; Attendance: 0
Note: The match was played behind closed doors.

17 December 2022 11	MSV Duisburg	2–3	VfB Oldenburg	Duisburg
16:00	Hettwer 9'; Bouhaddouz 47'	Report	Krasniqi 27'; Starke 31'; Hasenhüttl 64' (pen.)	Stadium: Westender Straße; Referee: Jan Peter Weßels

22 December 2022 12	MSV Duisburg (Germany)	1–1	(Netherlands) Fortuna Sittard	Duisburg
16:00	Girth 80'	Report	Cissé 90'	Stadium: Westender Straße; Attendance: 0
Note: The match will be played behind closed doors.

5 January 2023 13	MSV Duisburg	6–0	KFC Uerdingen	Duisburg
	Bouhaddouz 3', 77', 82'; Girth 11'; Pusch 17'; Ajani 29'	Report		Stadium: Westender Straße; Attendance: 0 Referee: Martin Ulankiewicz
Note: The match was played behind closed doors.

7 January 2023 14	SC Paderborn	4–0	MSV Duisburg	Paderborn
	Hünemeier 48'; Leipertz 56'; Rohr 64'; Conteh 68'	Report		Attendance: 0 Referee: Leonidas Exuzidis
Note: The match was played behind closed doors.

== Competitions ==
Times from 1 July to 29 October 2022 and from 26 March to 30 June 2023 are UTC+2, from 30 October 2022 to 25 March 2023 UTC+1.

=== Overview ===
Competition	First match	Last match	Starting round	Final position	Record							
Competition	First match	Last match	Starting round	Final position	Pld	W	D	L	GF	GA	GD	Win %
3. Liga	22 July 2022	27 May 2023	Matchday 1	12th place	38	11	13	14	54	58	−4	28.95
Lower Rhine Cup	25 August 2022	23 September 2022	Round 1	Round 2	2	1	0	1	9	2	+7	50.00
Total					40	12	13	15	63	60	+3	30.00

Last updated: 27 May 2023
Source: Soccerway

=== 3. Liga ===
==== League table ====
Pos	Team	Pld	W	D	L	GF	GA	GD	Pts
10	SC Verl	38	13	10	15	60	58	+2	49
11	FC Ingolstadt	38	14	5	19	54	56	−2	47
12	MSV Duisburg	38	11	13	14	54	58	−4	46
13	Borussia Dortmund II (Note: Reserve teams are ineligible for promotion or DFB-Pokal qualification.)	38	13	6	19	47	49	−2	45
14	Erzgebirge Aue	38	12	9	17	49	62	−13	45

Source: DFB
Rules for classification: 1) Points; 2) Goal difference; 3) Goals scored; 4) Head-to-head results; 5) Head-to-head away goals scored; 6) Away goals scored; 7) Play-off.

==== Results summary ====
Overall								Home						Away					
Pld	W	D	L	GF	GA	GD	Pts	W	D	L	GF	GA	GD	W	D	L	GF	GA	GD
38	11	13	14	54	58	−4	46	4	10	5	28	28	0	7	3	9	26	30	−4

Last updated: 27 May 2023.
Source: DFB

==== Results by round ====
Round	1	2	3	4	5	6	7	8	9	10	11	12	13	14	15	16	17	18	19	20	21	22	23	24	25	26	27	28	29	30	31	32	33	34	35	36	37	38
Ground	A	H	A	H	A	H	A	H	A	H	A	A	H	A	H	A	H	A	H	H	A	H	A	H	A	H	A	H	A	H	A	H	H	A	H	A	H	A
Result	L	D	W	W	W	D	L	L	L	W	L	L	D	W	D	W	L	W	L	L	D	W	L	D	W	D	L	D	D	L	D	D	D	W	W	L	D	L
Position	16	13	10	8	5	6	9	10	12	10	11	12	12	11	12	10	11	10	11	12	12	11	12	12	12	12	13	13	11	13	14	13	12	12	11	11	12	12

Source: DFB
A = Away; H = Home; W = Win; D = Draw; L = Loss

==== Matches ====
22 July 2022 1	VfL Osnabrück	1–0	MSV Duisburg	Osnabrück
19:00	Köhler 82'	Report		Stadium: Stadion an der Bremer Brücke; Attendance: 14,256; Referee: Patrick Hanslbauer

5 August 2022 2	MSV Duisburg	2–2	Rot-Weiss Essen	Duisburg
19:00	Bakalorz 6'; Stoppelkamp 52'	Report	Engelmann 67'; Ennali 71'	Stadium: MSV-Arena; Attendance: 28,200; Referee: Patrick Ittrich

9 August 2022 3	FSV Zwickau	0–1	MSV Duisburg	Zwickau
19:00		Report	Ekene 36'	Stadium: Stadion Zwickau; Attendance: 5,224; Referee: Martin Speckner

15 August 2022 4	MSV Duisburg	3–1	SC Freiburg II	Duisburg
19:00	Bitter 30'; Bouhaddouz 49'; Stoppelkamp 58'	Report	Fahrner 68'	Stadium: MSV-Arena; Attendance: 9,731; Referee: Konrad Oldhafer

21 August 2022 5	SV Meppen	0–3	MSV Duisburg	Meppen
14:00		Report	Fedl 35' (o.g.); Müller 65'; Stoppelkamp 68' (pen.)	Stadium: Hänsch-Arena; Attendance: 9,452; Referee: Wolfgang Haslberger

29 August 2022 6	MSV Duisburg	1–1	VfB Oldenburg	Duisburg
19:00	Girth 72'	Report	Krasniqi 47'	Stadium: MSV-Arena; Attendance: 13,407; Referee: Richard Hempel

3 September 2022 7	1860 Munich	4–1	MSV Duisburg	Munich
14:00	Vrenezi 2', 32'; Lakenmacher 12'; Deichmann 35'	Report	Hiller 42' (o.g.)	Stadium: Grünwalder Stadion; Attendance: 15,000; Referee: Marco Fritz

11 September 2022 8	MSV Duisburg	0–1	Dynamo Dresden	Duisburg
13:00		Report	Kutschke 72' (pen.)	Stadium: MSV-Arena; Attendance: 13,577; Referee: Patrick Kessel

18 September 2022 9	SC Verl	1–0	MSV Duisburg	Paderborn
14:00	Knost 57'	Report		Stadium: Benteler-Arena; Attendance: 1,761; Referee: Tom Bauer

1 October 2022 10	MSV Duisburg	1–0	Hallescher FC	Duisburg
14:00	Bakalorz 65'	Report		Stadium: MSV-Arena; Attendance: 9,084; Referee: Lars Erbst

8 October 2022 11	SV Elversberg	3–0	MSV Duisburg	Elversberg
14:00	Mustafa 10'; Koffi 82'; Fernández 90'	Report		Stadium: Waldstadion an der Kaiserlinde; Attendance: 4,048; Referee: Marc Philip Eckermann

16 October 2022 12	Borussia Dortmund II	2–0	MSV Duisburg	Wuppertal
14:00	Broschinski 38'; Pašalić 68'	Report		Stadium: Stadion am Zoo; Attendance: 2,542; Referee: Felix Bickel

22 October 2022 13	MSV Duisburg	1–1	Viktoria Köln	Duisburg
14:00	Bouhaddouz 61'	Report	Siebert 30'	Stadium: MSV-Arena; Attendance: 9,077; Referee: Timo Gerach

28 October 2022 14	Wehen Wiesbaden	1–3	MSV Duisburg	Wiesbaden
19:00	Wurtz 62'	Report	Jacobsen 54' (o.g.); Pusch 56'; Stoppelkamp 89'	Stadium: Brita-Arena; Attendance: 3,593; Referee: Konrad Oldhafer

5 November 2022 15	MSV Duisburg	1–1	SpVgg Bayreuth	Duisburg
14:00	Kölle 65'	Report	Nollenberger 38'	Stadium: MSV-Arena; Attendance: 10,243; Referee: Richard Hempel

8 November 2022 16	Erzgebirge Aue	0–2	MSV Duisburg	Aue
19:00		Report	Sorge 26' (o.g.); Pusch 49'	Stadium: Erzgebirgsstadion; Attendance: 6,313; Referee: Martin Speckner

12 November 2022 17	MSV Duisburg	0–1	FC Ingolstadt	Duisburg
14:00		Report	Brackelmann 58'	Stadium: MSV-Arena; Attendance: 10,161; Referee: Mitja Stegemann

14 January 2023 18	1. FC Saarbrücken	2–3	MSV Duisburg	Saarbrücken
14:00	Grimaldi 87'; Rabihic 90'	Report	Jander 9'; Girth 22'; Bitter 72'	Stadium: Ludwigsparkstadion; Attendance: 10,705; Referee: Tobias Welz

23 January 2023 19	MSV Duisburg	1–3	Waldhof Mannheim	Duisburg
19:00	Mai 43'	Report	Martinović 24'; Lebeau 47'; Pledl 55'	Stadium: MSV-Arena; Attendance: 10,582; Referee: Florian Exner

28 January 2023 20	MSV Duisburg	0–0	VfL Osnabrück	Duisburg
14:00	Stoppelkamp 50'	Report	Kleinhansl 18'; Tesche 36'	Stadium: MSV-Arena; Attendance: 11,358; Referee: Patrick Kessel

5 February 2023 21	Rot-Weiss Essen	1–1	MSV Duisburg	Essen
14:00	Alonso 53'	Report	Stoppelkamp 89'	Stadium: Stadion an der Hafenstraße; Attendance: 19,200; Referee: Patrick Hanslbauer

11 February 2023 22	MSV Duisburg	4–0	FSV Zwickau	Duisburg
14:00	Fleckstein 25'; Stoppelkamp 41'; Stierlin 49'; Pusch 67'	Report		Stadium: MSV-Arena; Attendance: 9,116; Referee: Christian Ballweg

18 February 2023 23	SC Freiburg II	2–0	MSV Duisburg	Freiburg
14:00	Schmid 9', 49'	Report		Stadium: Dreisamstadion; Attendance: 1,643; Referee: Nico Fuchs

25 February 2023 24	MSV Duisburg	0–0	SV Meppen	Duisburg
14:00		Report		Stadium: MSV-Arena; Attendance: 10,466; Referee: Timo Gansloweit

5 March 2023 25	VfB Oldenburg	2–3	MSV Duisburg	Hanover
14:00	Starke 26'; Hasenhüttl 87'	Report	Hettwer 20', 23'; Feltscher 40'	Stadium: Niedersachsenstadion; Attendance: 5,197; Referee: Assad Nouhoum

11 March 2023 26	MSV Duisburg	2–2	1860 Munich	Duisburg
14:00	Hettwer 77'; Bakir 80'	Report	Boyamba 61'; Fleckstein 72' (o.g.)	Stadium: MSV-Arena; Attendance: 12,388; Referee: Lars Erbst

15 March 2023 27	Dynamo Dresden	2–0	MSV Duisburg	Dresden
19:00	Kammerknecht 66'; Girth 76' (o.g.)	Report		Stadium: Rudolf-Harbig-Stadion; Attendance: 21,904; Referee: Patrick Kessel

18 March 2023 28	MSV Duisburg	3–3	SC Verl	Duisburg
14:00	Girth 12'; Hettwer 45+1'; Bakir 85'	Report	Baack 27', 50'; Wolfram 45+2'	Stadium: MSV-Arena; Attendance: 9,177; Referee: Felix Bickel

24 March 2023 29	Hallescher FC	2–2	MSV Duisburg	Halle
19:00	Bolyki 10'; Müller 58'	Report	Bakalorz 17'; Ajani 60'	Stadium: Leuna Chemie Stadion; Attendance: 9,012; Referee: Michael Bacher

8 April 2023 30	MSV Duisburg	0–5	Borussia Dortmund II	Duisburg
14:00		Report	Papadopoulos 24'; Njinmah 57'; Eberwein 67'; Senger 70' (o.g.); Pfanne 75'	Stadium: MSV-Arena; Attendance: 11,073; Referee: Jonas Brombacher

17 April 2023 31	Viktoria Köln	2–2	MSV Duisburg	Cologne
19:00	Meißner 30'; Mai 33' (o.g.)	Report	Frey 4'; Knoll 17'	Stadium: Sportpark Höhenberg; Attendance: 5,136; Referee: Matthias Jöllenbeck

22 April 2023 32	MSV Duisburg	1–1	Wehen Wiesbaden	Duisburg
14:00	Pusch 90' (pen.)	Report	Wurtz 26'	Stadium: MSV-Arena; Attendance: 9,214; Referee: Mitja Stegemann

25 April 2023 33	MSV Duisburg	2–2	SV Elversberg	Duisburg
19:00	Kölle 31'; Girth 62'	Report	Woltemade 13', 39'	Stadium: MSV-Arena; Attendance: 9,087; Referee: Patrick Hanslbauer
Note: The match, originally scheduled for 1 April 2023, was postponed due to bad weather.

29 April 2023 34	SpVgg Bayreuth	0–4	MSV Duisburg	Bayreuth
14:00		Report	Kölle 7', 55'; Hettwer 65'; Feltscher 76'	Stadium: Hans-Walter-Wild-Stadion; Attendance: 4,129; Referee: Alexander Sather

5 May 2023 35	MSV Duisburg	3–0	Erzgebirge Aue	Duisburg
19:00	Girth 23'; Kölle 62'; Pusch 65'	Report		Stadium: MSV-Arena; Attendance: 11,199; Referee: Timo Gansloweit

12 May 2023 36	FC Ingolstadt	2–0	MSV Duisburg	Ingolstadt
19:00	Civeja 42'; Schmidt 58'	Report		Stadium: Audi Sportpark; Attendance: 3,730; Referee: Nico Fuchs

21 May 2023 37	MSV Duisburg	2–2	1. FC Saarbrücken	Duisburg
14:00	Michelbrink 27'; Becker 41' (o.g.)	Report	Rizzuto 38'; Rabihic 56'	Stadium: MSV-Arena; Attendance: 16,643; Referee: Konrad Oldhafer

27 May 2023 38	Waldhof Mannheim	3–1	MSV Duisburg	Mannheim
13:30	Martinović 6'; Pledl 18'; Taz 72'	Report	Bouhaddouz 87'	Stadium: Carl-Benz-Stadion; Attendance: 9,414; Referee: Wolfgang Haslberger

=== Lower Rhine Cup ===
25 August 2022 Round 1	Victoria Mennrath	0–8	MSV Duisburg	Mönchengladbach
19:30		Report	Bouhaddouz 7'; Ekene 28', 34'; Pusch 38', 45+1'; Girth 58', 80'; Wild 86' (pen.)	Stadium: Sportanlage Mennrath; Attendance: 700; Referee: Felix May

23 September 2022 Round 2	Rot-Weiß Oberhausen	2–1	MSV Duisburg	Oberhausen
19:00	Winter 50'; Ngyombo 64'	Report	Bouhaddouz 83'	Stadium: Niederrheinstadion; Attendance: 9,770; Referee: Christian Bandurski

== Statistics ==
=== Squad statistics ===
No.	Pos	Nat	Player	Total		3. Liga		Lower Rhine Cup	
No.	Pos	Nat	Player	Apps	Goals	Apps	Goals	Apps	Goals
1	GK	(Germany) GER	Vincent Müller	33	1	31	1	2	0
2	DF	(Germany) GER	Baran Mogultay	28	0	26	0	2	0
4	DF	(Germany) GER	Marvin Senger	29	0	28	0	1	0
5	DF	(Germany) GER	Leroy Kwadwo	10	0	10	0	0	0
6	MF	(Germany) GER	Marvin Bakalorz	31	2	30	2	1	0
7	MF	(Germany) GER	Kolja Pusch	34	7	32	5	2	2
8	MF	(Morocco) MAR	Hamza Anhari	3	0	2	0	1	0
9	MF	(Germany) GER	Alaa Bakir	15	1	15	1	0	0
10	MF	(Germany) GER	Moritz Stoppelkamp	28	7	28	7	0	0
11	FW	(Morocco) MAR	Aziz Bouhaddouz	29	5	27	3	2	2
13	FW	(Germany) GER	Julian Hettwer	27	5	25	5	2	0
15	DF	(Germany) GER	Tobias Fleckstein	22	1	20	1	2	0
16	MF	(Germany) GER	Jonas Michelbrink	14	1	13	1	1	0
17	DF	(Germany) GER	Marvin Knoll	9	1	9	1	0	0
18	MF	(Germany) GER	Caspar Jander	30	1	29	1	1	0
19	FW	(Germany) GER	Chinedu Ekene	25	3	23	1	2	2
20	MF	(Germany) GER	Marvin Ajani	37	1	35	1	2	0
21	DF	(Venezuela) VEN	Rolf Feltscher	17	2	17	2	0	0
23	MF	(Germany) GER	Niclas Stierlin	30	1	28	1	2	0
24	GK	(Germany) GER	Maximilian Braune	6	0	6	0	0	0
26	DF	(Germany) GER	Vincent Gembalies	0	0	0	0	0	0
27	FW	(Germany) GER	Phillip König	20	0	18	0	2	0
28	DF	(Germany) GER	Sebastian Mai	26	1	26	1	0	0
29	DF	(Germany) GER	Joshua Bitter	31	2	30	2	1	0
31	FW	(Germany) GER	Benjamin Girth	20	7	19	5	1	2
32	DF	(Germany) GER	Niklas Kölle	31	5	29	5	2	0
33	GK	(Germany) GER	Lukas Raeder	2	0	2	0	0	0
37	MF	(Germany) GER	Marlon Frey	35	3	33	3	2	0
	MF	(Germany) GER	Rudolf Ndualu †	0	0	0	0	0	0
	FW	(Germany) GER	Gordon Wild †	6	1	5	0	1	1

Last updated: 27 May 2023
Source: Soccerway

^{†} Player left during the season.

=== Goals ===
As of 27 May 2023

Rank	Player	3. Liga	LR Cup	Total
1	(Germany) Benjamin Girth	5	2	7
1	(Germany) Kolja Pusch	4	2	7
1	(Germany) Moritz Stoppelkamp	7	0	7
4	(Morocco) Aziz Bouhaddouz	3	2	5
4	(Germany) Julian Hettwer	5	0	5
4	(Germany) Niklas Kölle	5	0	5
7	(Germany) Marvin Bakalorz	2	0	3
7	(Germany) Chinedu Ekene	1	2	3
9	(Germany) Alaa Bakir	2	0	2
9	(Germany) Joshua Bitter	2	0	2
9	(Venezuela) Rolf Feltscher	2	0	2
11	(Germany) Marvin Ajani	1	0	1
11	(Germany) Tobias Fleckstein	1	0	1
11	(Germany) Marlon Frey	1	0	1
11	(Germany) Benjamin Girth	1	0	1
11	(Germany) Caspar Jander	1	0	1
11	(Germany) Marvin Knoll	1	0	1
11	(Germany) Sebastian Mai	1	0	1
11	(Germany) Jonas Michelbrink	1	0	1
11	(Germany) Vincent Müller	1	0	1
11	(Germany) Niclas Stierlin	1	0	1
11	(Germany) Gordon Wild	0	1	1
Own goals		5	0	5
Total		54	9	63

=== Clean sheets ===
As of 27 May 2023

Rank	Player	3. Liga	LR Cup	Total
1	(Germany) Vincent Müller	8	1	9
2	(Germany) Maximilian Braune	0	0	0
2	(Germany) Lukas Raeder	0	0	0
Total		8	1	9

=== Disciplinary record ===
N	P	Nat.	Name	3. Liga			LR Cup			Total			Notes
N	P	Nat.	Name	Yellow card	Second yellow card	Red card	Yellow card	Second yellow card	Red card	Yellow card	Second yellow card	Red card	Notes
37	MF	(Germany)	Marlon Frey	3		1				3		1	
4	DF	(Germany)	Marvin Senger	6	1					6	1		
18	MF	(Germany)	Caspar Jander	6	1					6	1		
20	MF	(Germany)	Marvin Ajani	5				1		5	1		
15	DF	(Germany)	Tobias Fleckstein	4	1					4	1		
29	DF	(Germany)	Joshua Bitter	4	1					4	1		
11	FW	(Germany)	Aziz Bouhaddouz	2	1					2	1		
28	DF	(Germany)	Sebastian Mai	12						12			
23	MF	(Germany)	Niclas Stierlin	7						7			
6	MF	(Germany)	Marvin Bakalorz	5			1			6			
5	DF	(Germany)	Leroy Kwadwo	5						5			
2	DF	(Germany)	Baran Mogultay	4						4			
7	MF	(Germany)	Kolja Pusch	4						4			
10	MF	(Germany)	Moritz Stoppelkamp	4						4			
32	DF	(Germany)	Niklas Kölle	3						3			
13	FW	(Germany)	Julian Hettwer	2						2			
27	FW	(Germany)	Phillip König	2						2			
1	GK	(Germany)	Vincent Müller	1						1			
8	MF	(Germany)	Hamza Anhari	1						1			
19	FW	(Germany)	Chinedu Ekene	1						1			
21	DF	(Venezuela)	Rolf Feltscher	1						1			
24	GK	(Germany)	Maximilian Braune	1						1			
31	FW	(Germany)	Benjamin Girth	1						1			

Last updated: 27 May 2023
Source: Soccerway
Only competitive matches
(yellow card) = Number of bookings; (second yellow card) = Number of sending offs after a second yellow card; (red card) = Number of sending offs by a direct red card.
