= 2020–21 Hertha BSC season =

Hertha BSC
2020–21 season
- Director of Sport: Michael Preetz
- President: Werner Gegenbauer
- Manager: Bruno Labbadia (until 24 January); Pál Dárdai (from 25 January)
- Stadium: Olympiastadion
- Bundesliga: 14th
- DFB-Pokal: First round
- Top goalscorer: League: Jhon Córdoba; Matheus Cunha; Krzysztof Piątek (7 each); All: Matheus Cunha (8)
Home colours	Away colours	Third colours

The 2020–21 season was Hertha BSC's 128th season in existence and the club's eighth consecutive season in the top flight of German football. In addition to the domestic league, Hertha BSC participated in this season's edition of the DFB-Pokal. The season covered the period from 1 July 2020 to 30 June 2021.

== Players ==
=== First-team squad ===
As of 9 February 2021

Note: Flags indicate national team as defined under FIFA eligibility rules; some limited exceptions apply. Players may hold more than one non-FIFA nationality.

No.	Pos.	Nation	Player
1	GK	GER	Alexander Schwolow
2	DF	SVK	Peter Pekarík
5	DF	GER	Niklas Stark (vice-captain)
6	MF	CZE	Vladimír Darida
7	FW	AUS	Mathew Leckie
8	MF	FRA	Matteo Guendouzi (on loan from Arsenal)
9	FW	POL	Krzysztof Piątek
10	FW	BRA	Matheus Cunha
11	FW	BEL	Dodi Lukebakio
12	GK	GER	Nils Körber
13	DF	GER	Lukas Klünter
14	DF	PAR	Omar Alderete
15	FW	COL	Jhon Córdoba
16	MF	NED	Javairô Dilrosun
17	DF	GER	Maximilian Mittelstädt

No.	Pos.	Nation	Player
18	MF	ARG	Santiago Ascacíbar
20	DF	BEL	Dedryck Boyata (captain)
21	DF	GER	Marvin Plattenhardt
22	GK	NOR	Rune Jarstein
23	MF	GER	Eduard Löwen
24	FW	SRB	Nemanja Radonjić (on loan from Marseille)
25	DF	GER	Jordan Torunarigha
27	FW	GER	Jessic Ngankam
28	MF	GER	Sami Khedira
29	MF	FRA	Lucas Tousart
31	DF	GER	Márton Dárdai
32	DF	GER	Luca Netz
33	FW	NED	Daishawn Redan
39	MF	GER	Julian Albrecht
42	DF	NED	Deyovaisio Zeefuik
—	FW	SUI	Ruwen Werthmüller

=== Players out on loan ===
Note: Flags indicate national team as defined under FIFA eligibility rules; some limited exceptions apply. Players may hold more than one non-FIFA nationality.

No.	Pos.	Nation	Player
—	MF	GER	Arne Maier (at Arminia Bielefeld until 30 June 2021)
—	FW	POL	Dennis Jastrzembski (at Waldhof Mannheim until 30 June 2021)

No.	Pos.	Nation	Player
—	FW	GER	Davie Selke (at Werder Bremen until 30 June 2021)

== Transfers ==
=== In ===
No.	Pos	Player	Transferred from	Fee	Date	Source
1	GK	(Germany) Alexander Schwolow	(Germany) SC Freiburg	€8,000,000	4 August 2020	
42	DF	(Netherlands) Deyovaisio Zeefuik	(Netherlands) FC Groningen	€4,000,000	6 August 2020	
15	FW	(Colombia) Jhon Córdoba	(Germany) 1. FC Köln	€15,000,000	15 September 2020	
8	MF	(France) Matteo Guendouzi	(England) Arsenal	Loan	5 October 2020	
14	DF	(Paraguay) Omar Alderete	(Switzerland) FC Basel	Undisclosed	5 October 2020	
23	MF	(Germany) Eduard Löwen	(Germany) FC Augsburg	Loan termination	5 October 2020	
24	FW	(Serbia) Nemanja Radonjić	(France) Marseille	Loan	1 February 2021	
28	MF	(Germany) Sami Khedira	(Italy) Juventus	Free	1 February 2021	

=== Out ===
No.	Pos	Player	Transferred to	Fee	Date	Source
1	GK	(Germany) Thomas Kraft		Retired	1 July 2020	
3	DF	(Norway) Per Ciljan Skjelbred	(Norway) Rosenborg	Free	1 July 2020	
9	FW	(Germany) Alexander Esswein		Free	1 July 2020	
19	FW	(Bosnia and Herzegovina) Vedad Ibišević	(Germany) Schalke 04	Free	1 July 2020	
8	FW	(Ivory Coast) Salomon Kalou	(Brazil) Botafogo	Free	9 July 2020	
12	GK	(Germany) Dennis Smarsch	(Germany) FC St. Pauli	Free	2 August 2020	
14	FW	(Germany) Pascal Köpke	(Germany) 1. FC Nürnberg	Undisclosed	29 August 2020	
40	MF	(Germany) Lazar Samardžić	(Germany) RB Leipzig	Undisclosed	8 September 2020	
39	FW	(Turkey) Muhammed Kiprit	(Germany) KFC Uerdingen	Free	14 September 2020	
10	MF	(Slovakia) Ondrej Duda	(Germany) 1. FC Köln	€7,000,000	16 September 2020	
4	DF	(Netherlands) Karim Rekik	(Spain) Sevilla	€4,000,000	5 October 2020	
23	MF	(Germany) Arne Maier	(Germany) Arminia Bielefeld	Loan	5 October 2020	
29	DF	(Germany) Florian Baak	(Germany) FC Winterthur	Free	12 October 2020	
24	FW	(Germany) Palkó Dárdai	(Hungary) Fehérvár	Undisclosed	5 January 2021	
35	DF	(Tunisia) Omar Rekik	(England) Arsenal U23	€600,000	7 January 2021	
32	FW	(Germany) Dennis Jastrzembski	(Germany) Waldhof Mannheim	Loan	27 January 2021	

== Pre-season and friendlies ==
Win Draw Loss

7 August 2020 Friendly	Saint-Étienne (France)	Cancelled	(Germany) Hertha BSC	Saint-Étienne, France
18:00 CEST (UTC+2)				Stadium: Stade Geoffroy-Guichard

14 August 2020 Friendly	Hertha BSC (Germany)	2–0	(Germany) Viktoria Köln	Berlin, Germany
16:00 CEST (UTC+2)	Lukebakio 41'; Redan 79'	Report		Stadium: Hanns-Braun-Stadion; Attendance: 0 Referee: Florian Lechner

25 August 2020 Friendly	Hertha BSC (Germany)	Cancelled	(Germany) Eintracht Braunschweig	Berlin, Germany
16:00 CEST (UTC+2)				Stadium: Olympiastadion

25 August 2020 Friendly	Ajax (Netherlands)	1–0	(Germany) Hertha BSC	Amsterdam, Netherlands
19:00 CEST (UTC+2)	Labyad 12'	Report		Stadium: Johan Cruyff Arena; Attendance: 6,000; Referee: Marc Nagtegaal

29 August 2020 Friendly	Hertha BSC (Germany)	Cancelled	(Netherlands) PSV	Berlin, Germany
15:00 CEST (UTC+2)				Stadium: Hanns-Braun-Stadion

29 August 2020 Friendly	Hertha BSC (Germany)	0–4	(Netherlands) PSV	Berlin, Germany
17:00 CEST (UTC+2)		Report	Malen 37'; Stark 47' (o.g.); Gakpo 70'; Lammers 76'	Stadium: Hanns-Braun-Stadion; Attendance: 0 Referee: Florian Lechner

5 September 2020 Friendly	Hamburger SV (Germany)	2–0	(Germany) Hertha BSC	Hamburg, Germany
17:00 CEST (UTC+2)	Hunt 7' (pen.); Hinterseer 34'	Report		Stadium: Volksparkstadion; Attendance: 0 Referee: Konrad Oldhafer

== Competitions ==
=== Overview ===
Competition	First match	Last match	Starting round	Final position	Record							
Competition	First match	Last match	Starting round	Final position	Pld	W	D	L	GF	GA	GD	Win %
Bundesliga	19 September 2020	22 May 2021	Matchday 1	14th	34	8	11	15	41	52	−11	23.53
DFB-Pokal	11 September 2020		First round	First round	1	0	0	1	4	5	−1	0.00
Total					35	8	11	16	45	57	−12	22.86

Source: Soccerway

=== Bundesliga ===
==== League table ====
Pos	Team	Pld	W	D	L	GF	GA	GD	Pts	Qualification or relegation
12	Mainz 05	34	10	9	15	39	56	−17	39	
13	FC Augsburg	34	10	6	18	36	54	−18	36	
14	Hertha BSC	34	8	11	15	41	52	−11	35	
15	Arminia Bielefeld	34	9	8	17	26	52	−26	35	
16	1. FC Köln (O)	34	8	9	17	34	60	−26	33	Qualification for the relegation play-offs

Source: DFB
Rules for classification: 1) Points; 2) Goal difference; 3) Goals scored; 4) Head-to-head results; 5) Head-to-head away goals scored; 6) Away goals scored; 7) Play-off.
(O) Play-off winners

==== Results summary ====
Overall								Home						Away					
Pld	W	D	L	GF	GA	GD	Pts	W	D	L	GF	GA	GD	W	D	L	GF	GA	GD
34	8	11	15	41	52	−11	35	5	5	7	21	26	−5	3	6	8	20	26	−6

Source: DFB

==== Results by round ====
Round	1	2	3	4	5	6	7	8	9	10	11	12	13	14	15	16	17	18	19	20	21	22	23	24	25	26	27	28	29	30	31	32	33	34
Ground	A	H	A	H	A	H	A	H	A	H	A	H	A	H	A	A	H	H	A	H	A	H	A	H	A	H	A	H	A	H	A	H	H	A
Result	W	L	L	L	L	D	W	L	D	W	D	D	L	W	L	D	L	L	L	L	D	L	L	W	L	W	D	D	D	W	W	D	D	L
Position	2	10	13	15	15	14	12	13	13	12	11	12	14	12	12	13	14	14	15	15	15	15	15	15	16	14	14	15	16	14	13	13	14	14

Source: DFB
A = Away; H = Home; W = Win; D = Draw; L = Loss

==== Matches ====
The league fixtures were announced on 7 August 2020.

19 September 2020 1	Werder Bremen	1–4	Hertha BSC	Bremen
15:30 CEST (UTC+2)	Eggestein (yellow card) 46'; Selke 69', (yellow card) 90+1'	Report	Pekarík 42'; Lukebakio 45+2'; Cunha 62'; Córdoba 90'	Stadium: Weser-Stadion; Attendance: 8,400; Referee: Sascha Stegemann

25 September 2020 2	Hertha BSC	1–3	Eintracht Frankfurt	Berlin
20:30 CEST (UTC+2)	Tousart (yellow card) 35'; Cunha (yellow card) 72'; Hinteregger 77' (o.g.); Boyata (yellow card) 78'	Report	Silva 30' (pen.); Dost 37'; Rode (yellow card) 47', (goal) 71'; Touré (yellow card) 56'; Kamada (yellow card) 84'; Ilsanker (yellow card) 90'	Stadium: Olympiastadion; Attendance: 4,000; Referee: Bastian Dankert

4 October 2020 3	Bayern Munich	4–3	Hertha BSC	Munich
18:00 CEST (UTC+2)	Lewandowski 40', 51', 85', 90+2' (pen.), (yellow card) 90+4'; Hernandez (yellow card) 58'; Gnabry (yellow card) 85'	Report	Córdoba (yellow card) 13', (goal) 60'; Cunha 71'; Piątek (yellow card) 84'; Ngankam 88'; Mittelstädt (yellow card) 90+2'	Stadium: Allianz Arena; Attendance: 0 Referee: Benjamin Cortus

17 October 2020 4	Hertha BSC	0–2	VfB Stuttgart	Berlin
15:30 CEST (UTC+2)	Cunha (yellow card) 15'; Stark (yellow card) 74'	Report	Kempf 9'; Kalajdžić (yellow card) 29'; Didavi (yellow card) 45'; Castro 68'	Stadium: Olympiastadion; Attendance: 4,000; Referee: Harm Osmers

24 October 2020 5	RB Leipzig	2–1	Hertha BSC	Leipzig
15:30 CEST (UTC+2)	Upamecano 11', (yellow card) 49'; Sabitzer 77' (pen.)	Report	Córdoba 8'; Tousart (yellow card) 17'; Zeefuik (yellow card) 47' (yellow-red card) 50'; Ngankam (yellow card) 90+2'	Stadium: Red Bull Arena; Attendance: 999; Referee: Tobias Stieler

1 November 2020 6	Hertha BSC	1–1	VfL Wolfsburg	Berlin
18:00 CET (UTC+1)	Cunha 6'; Plattenhardt (yellow card) 76'; Pekarík (yellow card) 86'; Guendouzi (yellow card) 90+2'	Report	Baku 20'; Gerhardt (yellow card) 90+1'	Stadium: Olympiastadion; Attendance: 0 Referee: Martin Petersen

7 November 2020 7	FC Augsburg	0–3	Hertha BSC	Augsburg
15:30 CET (UTC+1)	Caligiuri (yellow card) 18'; Gouweleeuw (yellow card) 38'; Gruezo (yellow card) 67'	Report	Cunha 44' (pen.); Lukebakio 52'; Piątek 86'	Stadium: WWK Arena; Attendance: 0 Referee: Frank Willenborg

21 November 2020 8	Hertha BSC	2–5	Borussia Dortmund	Berlin
20:30 CET (UTC+1)	Cunha 33', 79' (pen.), (yellow card) 61'	Report	Guerreiro (yellow card) 10', (goal) 70'; Haaland 47', 49', 62', 79'	Stadium: Olympiastadion; Attendance: 0 Referee: Bastian Dankert

29 November 2020 9	Bayer Leverkusen	0–0	Hertha BSC	Leverkusen
15:30 CET (UTC+1)	Sinkgraven (yellow card) 80'; Bailey (yellow card) 90+4'	Report	Cunha (yellow card) 30'	Stadium: BayArena; Attendance: 0 Referee: Daniel Schlager

4 December 2020 10	Hertha BSC	3–1	Union Berlin	Berlin
20:30 CET (UTC+1)	Pekarík 51'; Piątek 74', 77'; Cunha (yellow card) 84'	Report	Awoniyi 20'; Andrich (red card) 23'; Trimmel (yellow card) 36'; Ryerson (yellow card) 52'; Lenz (yellow card) 64'	Stadium: Olympiastadion; Attendance: 0 Referee: Felix Brych

12 December 2020 11	Borussia Mönchengladbach	1–1	Hertha BSC	Mönchengladbach
15:30 CET (UTC+1)	Wendt (yellow card) 12'; Lazaro (yellow card) 43'; Embolo 70'; Neuhaus (yellow card) 82'	Report	Pekarík (yellow card) 26'; Guendouzi 47', (yellow card) 68'	Stadium: Borussia-Park; Attendance: 0 Referee: Robert Hartmann

15 December 2020 12	Hertha BSC	0–0	Mainz 05	Berlin
20:30 CET (UTC+1)	Piątek (yellow card) 33'; Cunha (yellow card) 49'; Torunarigha (yellow card) 66'	Report	Stöger (yellow card) 28'	Stadium: Olympiastadion; Attendance: 0 Referee: Matthias Jöllenbeck

20 December 2020 13	SC Freiburg	4–1	Hertha BSC	Freiburg
15:30 CET (UTC+1)	Grifo 7'; Demirović 59'; Gulde 67'; Petersen 90+4' (pen.)	Report	Lukebakio 52'	Stadium: Schwarzwald-Stadion; Attendance: 0 Referee: Tobias Reichel

2 January 2021 14	Hertha BSC	3–0	Schalke 04	Berlin
18:30 CET (UTC+1)	Tousart (yellow card) 14'; Guendouzi 36', (yellow card) 51'; Córdoba 52'; Piątek 80'	Report	Hoppe (yellow card) 37'; Mascarell (yellow card) 58'	Stadium: Olympiastadion; Attendance: 0 Referee: Sven Jablonski

10 January 2021 15	Arminia Bielefeld	1–0	Hertha BSC	Bielefeld
18:00 CET (UTC+1)	Laursen (yellow card) 26'; Yabo 64'	Report	Pekarík (yellow card) 51'	Stadium: Bielefelder Alm; Attendance: 0 Referee: Guido Winkmann

16 January 2021 16	1. FC Köln	0–0	Hertha BSC	Cologne
15:30 CET (UTC+1)	Čestić (yellow card) 63'; Czichos (yellow card) 77'	Report	Alderete (yellow card) 45+1'; Darida (yellow card) 54'; Córdoba (yellow card) 78'	Stadium: RheinEnergieStadion; Attendance: 0 Referee: Frank Willenborg

19 January 2021 17	Hertha BSC	0–3	1899 Hoffenheim	Berlin
20:30 CET (UTC+1)	Piątek (penalty missed) 12'; Lukebakio (yellow card) 66'	Report	Gaćinović (yellow card) 25'; Rudy 33'; Kramarić 68', 88'	Stadium: Olympiastadion; Attendance: 0 Referee: Harm Osmers

23 January 2021 18	Hertha BSC	1–4	Werder Bremen	Berlin
18:30 CET (UTC+1)	Mittelstädt (yellow card) 9'; Cunha (penalty missed) 21'; Córdoba (yellow card) 26', (goal) 45+2'	Report	Selke 10' (pen.), (yellow card) 12'; Mbom (yellow card) 21'; Toprak 29'; Bittencourt 57', (yellow card) 86'; Sargent 77'	Stadium: Olympiastadion; Attendance: 0 Referee: Daniel Schlager

30 January 2021 19	Eintracht Frankfurt	3–1	Hertha BSC	Frankfurt
15:30 CET (UTC+1)	Tuta (yellow card) 35'; Silva 67', 90+5' (pen.); Hinteregger 85'	Report	Tousart (yellow card) 37'; Torunarigha (yellow card) 59'; Piątek 66', (yellow card) 88'; Cunha (yellow card) 90+4'	Stadium: Deutsche Bank Park; Attendance: 0 Referee: Florian Badstübner

5 February 2021 20	Hertha BSC	0–1	Bayern Munich	Berlin
20:00 CET (UTC+1)	Darida (yellow card) 41'; Khedira (yellow card) 90+3'	Report	Lewandowski (penalty missed) 12'; Coman 21'; Pavard (yellow card) 31'	Stadium: Olympiastadion; Attendance: 0 Referee: Robert Schröder

13 February 2021 21	VfB Stuttgart	1–1	Hertha BSC	Stuttgart
15:30 CET (UTC+1)	Mavropanos (yellow card) 7'; Kalajdžić 45+1'; Karazor (yellow card) 69'	Report	Piątek (yellow card) 13'; Pekarík (yellow card) 37'; Netz 82'	Stadium: Mercedes-Benz Arena; Attendance: 0 Referee: Harm Osmers

21 February 2021 22	Hertha BSC	0–3	RB Leipzig	Berlin
15:30 CET (UTC+1)	Cunha (yellow card) 34'	Report	Sabitzer 28', (yellow card) 45'; Mukiele 71'; Orbán 84'	Stadium: Olympiastadion; Attendance: 0 Referee: Sven Jablonski

27 February 2021 23	VfL Wolfsburg	2–0	Hertha BSC	Wolfsburg
15:30 CET (UTC+1)	Klünter 38' (o.g.); Paulo Otávio (yellow card) 45'; Mbabu (yellow card) 47'; Pongračić (yellow card) 48' (yellow-red card) 90+4'; Lacroix 89'; Białek (yellow card) 90+5'	Report		Stadium: Volkswagen Arena; Attendance: 0 Referee: Bastian Dankert

6 March 2021 24	Hertha BSC	2–1	FC Augsburg	Berlin
15:30 CET (UTC+1)	Stark (yellow card) 45+2'; Piątek 62'; Lukebakio (yellow card) 72', (goal) 89' (pen.)	Report	Bénes 2'; Hahn (yellow card) 26'; Valentin (yellow card) 49'; Gouweleeuw (yellow card) 80'	Stadium: Olympiastadion; Attendance: 0 Referee: Florian Badstübner

13 March 2021 25	Borussia Dortmund	2–0	Hertha BSC	Dortmund
18:30 CET (UTC+1)	Schulz (yellow card) 23'; Brandt 54'; Moukoko 90+1'	Report	Zeefuik (yellow card) 59'; Darida (red card) 80'	Stadium: Signal Iduna Park; Attendance: 0 Referee: Martin Petersen

21 March 2021 26	Hertha BSC	3–0	Bayer Leverkusen	Berlin
15:30 CET (UTC+1)	Zeefuik 4'; Cunha 26'; Córdoba 33'	Report	Bailey (yellow card) 35'; Amiri (yellow card) 79'	Stadium: Olympiastadion; Attendance: 0 Referee: Felix Brych

4 April 2021 27	Union Berlin	1–1	Hertha BSC	Berlin
18:00 CEST (UTC+2)	Andrich 10'; Ryerson (yellow card) 17'; Prömel (yellow card) 28'	Report	Guendouzi (yellow card) 28'; Lukebakio 35' (pen.); Tousart (yellow card) 45'; Torunarigha (yellow card) 53'; Ascacíbar (yellow card) 77'	Stadium: Stadion An der Alten Försterei; Attendance: 0 Referee: Sascha Stegemann

10 April 2021 28	Hertha BSC	2–2	Borussia Mönchengladbach	Berlin
15:30 CEST (UTC+2)	Zeefuik (yellow card) 20'; Ascacíbar 23'; Mittelstädt (yellow card) 40'; Córdoba 49'	Report	Sommer (red card) 13'; Pléa 27'; Stindl 38' (pen.); Kramer (yellow card) 82'	Stadium: Olympiastadion; Attendance: 0 Referee: Patrick Ittrich

3 May 2021 29	Mainz 05	1–1	Hertha BSC	Mainz
18:00 CEST (UTC+2)	Bell (yellow card) 18'; Mwene 40'; Barreiro (yellow card) 72'	Report	Tousart 36', (yellow card) 39'; Cunha (yellow card) 67'; Ascacíbar (yellow card) 73'	Stadium: Opel Arena; Attendance: 0 Referee: Sascha Stegemann
Note: The match was originally scheduled for 18 April 2021, but was postponed after more than ten Hertha players and staff tested positive for COVID-19.

6 May 2021 30	Hertha BSC	3–0	SC Freiburg	Berlin
18:30 CEST (UTC+2)	Piątek 13'; Alderete (yellow card) 20'; Pekarík 22'; Guendouzi (yellow card) 38'; Torunarigha (yellow card) 64'; Darida (yellow card) 69'; Radonjić 85'	Report	Höfler (yellow card) 36'; Demirović (yellow card) 42'; Sallai (yellow card) 80'	Stadium: Olympiastadion; Attendance: 0 Referee: Benjamin Cortus
Note: The match was originally scheduled for 21 April 2021, but was postponed after more than ten Hertha players and staff tested positive for COVID-19.

9 May 2021 32	Hertha BSC	0–0	Arminia Bielefeld	Berlin
18:00 CEST (UTC+2)	Tousart (yellow card) 36'; Darida (yellow card) 90+1'; Radonjić (yellow card) 90+4'	Report	Prietl (yellow card) 37'; Brunner (yellow card) 51'; Lucoqui (yellow card) 87'; Kunze (yellow card) 90+1'	Stadium: Olympiastadion; Attendance: 0 Referee: Bastian Dankert

12 May 2021 31	Schalke 04	1–2	Hertha BSC	Gelsenkirchen
18:00 CEST (UTC+2)	Harit 6', (yellow card) 43'; Mustafi (yellow card) 54'; Kolašinac (yellow card) 68'	Report	Boyata 19', (yellow card) 68'; Darida (yellow card) 50'; Lukebakio (yellow card) 67' (yellow-red card) 89'; Ngankam 74'; Michelbrink (yellow card) 90+1'	Stadium: Veltins-Arena; Attendance: 0 Referee: Markus Schmidt
Note: The match was originally scheduled for 24 April 2021, but was postponed after more than ten Hertha players and staff tested positive for COVID-19.

15 May 2021 33	Hertha BSC	0–0	1. FC Köln	Berlin
15:30 CEST (UTC+2)	Boyata (yellow card) 13'; Torunarigha (yellow card) 35'	Report	Skhiri (yellow card) 23'; Jakobs (yellow card) 58'	Stadium: Olympiastadion; Attendance: 0 Referee: Deniz Aytekin

22 May 2021 34	1899 Hoffenheim	2–1	Hertha BSC	Sinsheim
15:30 CEST (UTC+2)	Adamyan 49'; Kramarić 90+1'	Report	Darida 43'	Stadium: Rhein-Neckar-Arena; Attendance: 100; Referee: Frank Willenborg

=== DFB-Pokal ===
11 September 2020 First round	Eintracht Braunschweig	5–4	Hertha BSC	Braunschweig
20:45 CEST (UTC+2)	Kobylański 2', 44', 66'; Mittelstädt 17' (o.g.); Kijewski (yellow card) 34'; Wiebe (yellow card) 69'; Abdullahi 73'	Report	Lukebakio 23', 83'; Cunha 29'; Pekarík 65'	Stadium: Eintracht-Stadion; Attendance: 500; Referee: Tobias Stieler

== Statistics ==
=== Appearances and goals ===
No.	Pos	Nat	Player	Total		Bundesliga		DFB-Pokal	
No.	Pos	Nat	Player	Apps	Goals	Apps	Goals	Apps	Goals
Goalkeepers
1	GK	(Germany) GER	Alexander Schwolow	27	0	26	0	1	0
12	GK	(Germany) GER	Nils Körber	0	0	0	0	0	0
22	GK	(Norway) NOR	Rune Jarstein	8	0	8	0	0	0
Defenders
2	DF	(Slovakia) SVK	Peter Pekarík	24	4	22+1	3	1	1
5	DF	(Germany) GER	Niklas Stark	34	0	31+2	0	1	0
13	DF	(Germany) GER	Lukas Klünter	11	0	11	0	0	0
14	DF	(Paraguay) PAR	Omar Alderete	17	0	14+3	0	0	0
17	DF	(Germany) GER	Maximilian Mittelstädt	28	0	22+5	0	1	0
20	DF	(Belgium) BEL	Dedryck Boyata	19	1	17+2	1	0	0
21	DF	(Germany) GER	Marvin Plattenhardt	17	0	12+4	0	1	0
25	DF	(Germany) GER	Jordan Torunarigha	14	0	11+3	0	0	0
31	DF	(Germany) GER	Márton Dárdai	12	0	9+3	0	0	0
32	DF	(Germany) GER	Luca Netz	11	1	2+9	1	0	0
42	DF	(Netherlands) NED	Deyovaisio Zeefuik	22	1	10+12	1	0	0
Midfielders
6	MF	(Czech Republic) CZE	Vladimír Darida	28	1	24+3	1	1	0
8	DF	(France) FRA	Matteo Guendouzi	24	2	19+5	2	0	0
11	MF	(Australia) AUS	Mathew Leckie	18	0	5+12	0	1	0
16	MF	(Netherlands) NED	Javairô Dilrosun	13	0	5+7	0	0+1	0
18	MF	(Argentina) ARG	Santiago Ascacíbar	13	1	8+5	1	0	0
23	MF	(Germany) GER	Eduard Löwen	7	0	1+6	0	0	0
28	MF	(Germany) GER	Sami Khedira	9	0	4+5	0	0	0
29	MF	(France) FRA	Lucas Tousart	27	1	25+1	1	1	0
40	MF	(Germany) GER	Jonas Michelbrink	2	0	0+2	0	0	0
40	MF	(Germany) GER	Jonas Dirkner	1	0	0+1	0	0	0
Forwards
7	FW	(Poland) POL	Krzysztof Piątek	32	7	18+14	7	0	0
9	FW	(Brazil) BRA	Matheus Cunha	28	8	25+2	7	1	1
11	FW	(Belgium) BEL	Dodi Lukebakio	30	7	21+8	5	1	2
15	FW	(Colombia) COL	Jhon Córdoba	21	7	17+4	7	0	0
24	FW	(Serbia) SRB	Nemanja Radonjić	12	1	5+7	1	0	0
27	FW	(Germany) GER	Jessic Ngankam	15	2	2+13	2	0	0
33	FW	(Netherlands) NED	Daishawn Redan	7	0	0+7	0	0	0
35	MF	(Germany) GER	Marten Winkler	1	0	0+1	0	0	0
Players transferred out during the season
4	DF	(Netherlands) NED	Karim Rekik	1	0	0	0	1	0
10	MF	(Slovakia) SVK	Ondrej Duda	1	0	0	0	0+1	0
23	MF	(Germany) GER	Arne Maier	3	0	0+2	0	0+1	0

Last updated: 22 May 2021
Source: Competitions

=== Goalscorers ===
Rank	Pos	No.	Nat	Name	Bundesliga	DFB-Pokal	Total
1	FW	9	(Brazil)	Matheus Cunha	7	1	8
2	FW	7	(Poland)	Krzysztof Piątek	7	0	7
2	FW	15	(Colombia)	Jhon Córdoba	7	0	7
2	FW	28	(Belgium)	Dodi Lukebakio	5	2	7
5	DF	2	(Slovakia)	Peter Pekarík	3	1	4
6	MF	8	(France)	Matteo Guendouzi	2	0	2
6	FW	27	(Germany)	Jessic Ngankam	2	0	2
8	MF	6	(Czech Republic)	Vladimír Darida	1	0	1
8	MF	18	(Argentina)	Santiago Ascacíbar	1	0	1
8	DF	20	(Belgium)	Dedryck Boyata	1	0	1
8	FW	24	(Serbia)	Nemanja Radonjić	1	0	1
8	MF	29	(France)	Lucas Tousart	1	0	1
8	DF	32	(Germany)	Luca Netz	1	0	1
8	DF	42	(Netherlands)	Deyovaisio Zeefuik	1	0	1
Own goals					1	0	1
Totals					41	4	45

Last updated: 22 May 2021
