= Marvin Senger =

German footballer

Personal information
- Date of birth: 6 January 2000 (age 26)
- Place of birth: Henstedt-Ulzburg, Germany
- Height: 1.93 m (6 ft 4 in)
- Position: Centre-back

Team information
- Current team: Botev Plovdiv
- Number: 22

Youth career
- –2016: Eintracht Norderstedt
- 2016–2019: FC St. Pauli

Senior career*
Years	Team	Apps	(Gls)
2019–2020	FC St. Pauli II	21	(0)
2019–2022	FC St. Pauli	3	(0)
2021–2022	→ 1. FC Kaiserslautern (loan)	21	(1)
2021–2022	→ 1. FC Kaiserslautern II	6	(0)
2022–2024	MSV Duisburg	46	(1)
2024–2026	Stal Mielec	51	(1)
2026–	Botev Plovdiv	3	(0)
- * Club domestic league appearances and goals as of 16:00, 6 October 2026 (UTC)

Marvin Senger (born 6 January 2000) is a German professional footballer who plays as a centre-back for Bulgarian First League club Botev Plovdiv.

== Career ==
=== FC St. Pauli ===
Senger made his professional debut for FC St. Pauli in the 2. Bundesliga on 5 June 2020, starting in the away match against VfL Bochum.

=== 1. FC Kaiserslautern ===
On 1 February 2021, which was the last day of the 2020–21 winter transfer window, he moved to 3. Liga club 1. FC Kaiserslautern on loan for the rest of the season.

=== MSV Duisburg ===
On 24 June 2022, Senger signed a two-year contract with MSV Duisburg.

=== Stal Mielec ===
Senger moved abroad for the first time in his career in July 2024, when he signed a two-year contract with Polish Ekstraklasa club Stal Mielec. He made his debut in Stal on 22 July during a 1–1 draw with Widzew Łódź. On 30 September, in the 85th minute of a 2–2 draw with KS Cracovia, he was given with the red card as a consequence of getting the second yellow card in a match. Senger scored the first goal for his new team on 27 October 2024, in the 57th minute of a 2–2 draw against Zagłębie Lubin.

== Career statistics ==
As of match played 25 April 2026

Appearances and goals by club, season and competition
Club	Season	League			National cup (Note: Includes DFB-Pokal, Polish Cup)		Total	
Club	Season	Division	Apps	Goals	Apps	Goals	Apps	Goals
FC St. Pauli II	2018–19	Regionalliga Nord	1	0	—		1	0
FC St. Pauli II	2019–20	Regionalliga Nord	19	0	—		19	0
FC St. Pauli II	2020–21	Regionalliga Nord	1	0	—		1	0
FC St. Pauli II	Total		21	0	—		21	0
FC St. Pauli	2019–20	2. Bundesliga	3	0	0	0	3	0
FC St. Pauli	2020–21	2. Bundesliga	0	0	1	0	1	0
FC St. Pauli	Total		3	0	1	0	4	0
1. FC Kaiserslautern (loan)	2020–21	3. Liga	15	1	—		15	1
1. FC Kaiserslautern (loan)	2021–22	3. Liga	6	0	1	0	7	0
1. FC Kaiserslautern (loan)	Total		21	1	1	0	22	1
1. FC Kaiserslautern II (loan)	2021–22	Oberliga	6	0	—		6	0
MSV Duisburg	2022–23	3. Liga	28	0	—		28	0
MSV Duisburg	2023–24	3. Liga	18	1	—		18	1
MSV Duisburg	Total		46	1	—		46	1
Stal Mielec	2024–25	Ekstraklasa	26	1	1	0	27	1
Stal Mielec	2025–26	I liga	25	0	1	0	26	0
Stal Mielec	Total		51	1	2	0	53	1
Career total			148	3	4	0	152	3
