= Santiago Castañeda =

American soccer player (born 2004)

Personal information
- Date of birth: November 13, 2004 (age 22)
- Place of birth: Tampa, Florida, US
- Height: 6 ft 2 in (1.88 m)
- Position: Midfielder

Team information
- Current team: SC Paderborn
- Number: 5

Youth career
- Florida Premier FC
- Tampa Bay Rowdies

Senior career*
Years	Team	Apps	(Gls)
2022–2023	Tampa Bay Rowdies	1	(0)
2023–2024	MSV Duisburg	31	(2)
2024–	SC Paderborn	71	(1)

International career^{‡}
2026	United States U21	2	(1)
2025–	United States U23	2	(0)
2026–	United States	1	(0)
- * Club domestic league appearances and goals as of October 31, 2026 ‡ National team caps and goals as of November 17, 2026

Santiago Castañeda (born November 13, 2004) is an American professional soccer player who plays as a midfielder for Bundesliga club SC Paderborn and the United States national team.

== Early life ==
Growing up in Tampa, Florida, Castañeda began playing soccer at the age of three. He holds both American and Colombian citizenship. His father is a former professional soccer player from Colombia. Until 2023, Castañeda was enrolled at Tampa Preparatory School.

== Career ==
In 2020, Castañeda joined Florida Premier FC in the Elite Clubs National League (ECNL). In December 2021, he participated in the ECNL Florida National Selection Game, ultimately being named man of the match. Described as one of the "brightest soccer players in the area", Castañeda caught the attention of the Tampa Bay Rowdies; he was brought into the team's training camp for the 2022 preseason. On April 4, 2022, he signed a USL Academy contract with the Rowdies, allowing him to train with a professional team while mainting his eligibility for youth club soccer and recruitment to the National Collegiate Athletic Association, from which he had previously received offers. One day later, he made his professional debut as a substitute in a 6–0 U.S. Open Cup win over The Villages SC. He would eventually make his USL Championship debut in a 5–2 win over the Pittsburgh Riverhounds on June 25, 2022.

On March 14, 2023, it was announced that Castañeda had signed for German club MSV Duisburg on a two-year contract. He made his debut in a 2–1 defeat to Jahn Regensburg in the 3. Liga on September 3, 2023. On December 2, 2023, Castañeda scored his first professional goal, a stoppage-time winner in a 1–0 win over VfB Lübeck. After the 2023–24 season, he moved to SC Paderborn.

== Career statistics ==
=== Club ===
As of match played October 31, 2026

Appearances and goals by club, season and competition
Club	Season	League			National cup		Other		Total	
Club	Season	Division	Apps	Goals	Apps	Goals	Apps	Goals	Apps	Goals
Tampa Bay Rowdies	2022	USL Championship	1	0	1	0	0	0	2	0
MSV Duisburg	2023–24	3. Liga	31	2	—		2 (Note: Appearances in Lower Rhine Cup)	0	33	2
SC Paderborn	2024–25	2. Bundesliga	32	0	2	1	—		34	1
SC Paderborn	2025–26	2. Bundesliga	31	0	1	0	2 (Note: Appearances in 2. Bundesliga promotion play-offs)	0	34	0
SC Paderborn	2026–27	Bundesliga	8	1	2	1	—		10	2
SC Paderborn	Total		71	1	5	2	2	0	78	3
Career total			103	3	6	2	4	0	113	5

=== International ===
As of match played November 17, 2026

Appearances and goals by national team and year
National team	Year	Apps	Goals
United States	2026	1	0
Total		1	0
