= Chinedu Ekene =

German footballer

Personal information
- Full name: Chinedu Aaron Ekene
- Date of birth: 15 January 2001 (age 25)
- Place of birth: Wuppertal, Germany
- Height: 1.77 m (5 ft 10 in)
- Position: Forward

Youth career
- –2018: Bayer Leverkusen

Senior career*
Years	Team	Apps	(Gls)
2018–2021	1899 Hoffenheim II	73	(15)
2021–2024	MSV Duisburg	37	(1)

International career
2014	Germany U15	2	(0)
2014	Germany U16	4	(1)
2015	Germany U17	5	(1)
- * Club domestic league appearances and goals as of 17:30, 11 November 2023 (UTC)

Chinedu Aaron Ekene (born 15 January 2001) is a German professional footballer who plays as a midfielder.

== Career ==
After spendings several years at 1899 Hoffenheim, he moved to MSV Duisburg in the summer of 2021. He made his professional debut in the 3. Liga on 21 August 2021, in the away match against 1. FC Magdeburg.

== Career statistics ==
As of 11 November 2023

Appearances and goals by club, season and competition
Club	Season	Division	League		Cup		Continental		Total	
Club	Season	Division	Apps	Goals	Apps	Goals	Apps	Goals	Apps	Goals
1899 Hoffenheim II	2018–19	Regionalliga Südwest	20	3	—		—		20	3
1899 Hoffenheim II	2019–20	Regionalliga Südwest	21	1	—		—		21	1
1899 Hoffenheim II	2020–21	Regionalliga Südwest	32	11	—		—		32	11
1899 Hoffenheim II	Total		73	15	0	0	0	0	73	15
MSV Duisburg	2021–22	3. Liga	3	0	—		—		3	0
MSV Duisburg	2022–23	3. Liga	23	1	—		—		23	1
MSV Duisburg	2023–24	3. Liga	11	0	—		—		11	0
MSV Duisburg	Total		37	1	0	0	—		37	1
Career total			110	16	0	0	0	0	110	16
