= Hamza Anhari =

Moroccan footballer

Personal information
- Date of birth: 30 January 2004 (age 22)
- Place of birth: Hemer, Germany
- Height: 1.78 m (5 ft 10 in)
- Position: Midfielder

Team information
- Current team: Fortuna Düsseldorf
- Number: 40

Youth career
- Borussia Dortmund
- 2018–2019: Rot-Weiss Essen
- 2019–2023: MSV Duisburg

Senior career*
| Years | Team | Apps | (Gls) |
| 2023–2024 | MSV Duisburg | 12 | (0) |
| 2024– | Fortuna Düsseldorf II | 26 | (7) |
| 2025– | Fortuna Düsseldorf | 3 | (0) |

International career
| 2021 | Germany U18 | 4 | (0) |
| 2022 | Morocco U20 | | |
- * Club domestic league appearances and goals as of 28 August 2026

Hamza Anhari (born 30 January 2004) is a professional footballer who plays as a midfielder for 3. Liga club Fortuna Düsseldorf. Born in Germany, he most recently represented Morocco at youth level.

== Club career ==
After spending a couple of years in the MSV Duisburg youth academy, he signed his first contract until 2025 on 24 May 2022. He made his professional debut for MSV Duisburg on 8 April 2023, in the 3. Liga match against Borussia Dortmund II. After the 2023–24 season, he moved to Fortuna Düsseldorf II.

== International career ==
Representing Germany U18 in 2021, he switched to Morocco U20 and participated in the 2022 Mediterranean Games. He was a key player in the bronze final match, scoring once as Morocco claimed bronze medals ahead of Turkey.

== Career statistics ==
As of 9 December 2023

Appearances and goals by club, season and competition
| Club | Season | League | | | Cup | | Continental | | Total | |
| Club | Season | Division | Apps | Goals | Apps | Goals | Apps | Goals | Apps | Goals |
|---|---|---|---|---|---|---|---|---|---|---|
| MSV Duisburg | 2022–23 | 3. Liga | 2 | 0 | 0 | 0 | — | | 2 | 0 |
| MSV Duisburg | 2023–24 | 3. Liga | 10 | 0 | 0 | — | — | | 10 | 0 |
| MSV Duisburg | Total | | 12 | 0 | 0 | 0 | — | | 12 | 0 |
