= Baran Moğultay =

German footballer

Personal information
- Date of birth: 18 May 2004 (age 22)
- Place of birth: Ahlen, Germany
- Height: 1.81 m (5 ft 11 in)
- Position: Left-back

Team information
- Current team: Iğdır
- Number: 2

Youth career
- VfB Waltrop
- BV Westfalia Wickede
- Westfalia Rhynern
- Hammer SpVg
- SpVgg Beckum
- Rot Weiss Ahlen
- 2017–2022: MSV Duisburg

Senior career*
Years	Team	Apps	(Gls)
2022–2024	MSV Duisburg	41	(0)
2024–2026	Borussia Dortmund II	25	(0)
2025–2026	→ Alanyaspor (loan)	4	(0)
2026–	Iğdır	0	(0)

International career^{‡}
2021	Germany U18	2	(0)
2024–2025	Turkey U21	6	(0)
- * Club domestic league appearances and goals as of 14 October 2026 ‡ National team caps and goals as of 8 June 2025

Baran Moğultay (born 18 May 2004) is a professional footballer who plays as a left-back for TFF 1. Lig club Iğdır. Born in Germany, he is a youth international for Turkey.

== Club career ==
Born in Ahlen, Moğultay passed through the academies of various clubs before joining MSV Duisburg in 2017 from Rot Weiss Ahlen. He signed his first professional contract in June 2022.

After making his debut in the Lower Rhine Cup, Moğultay made his 3. Liga debut against Halle in October 2022. After the 2023–24 season, he joined Borussia Dortmund II.

On 14 July 2025, Moğultay moved to Turkey and joined Süper Lig club Alanyaspor, on loan for the 2025–26 season.

== International career ==
Born in Germany, Moğultay is of Turkish descent. He has represented Germany at youth international level. He was called up to the Turkey U21s in November 2024.

== Career statistics ==
As of 20 December 2023

Appearances and goals by club, season and competition
Club	Season	League			Cup		Other		Total	
Club	Season	Division	Apps	Goals	Apps	Goals	Apps	Goals	Apps	Goals
MSV Duisburg	2022–23	3. Liga	26	0	—		—		26	0
MSV Duisburg	2023–24	3. Liga	15	0	—		—		15	0
MSV Duisburg	Total		41	0	0	0	—		41	0
