= Sebastian Mai =

German footballer

Personal information
- Date of birth: 10 December 1993 (age 32)
- Place of birth: Dresden, Germany
- Height: 1.95 m (6 ft 5 in)
- Position: Centre back

Youth career
- –2012: Dynamo Dresden

Senior career*
Years	Team	Apps	(Gls)
2012–2013	Dynamo Dresden II	11	(0)
2013–2014	Chemnitzer FC II	25	(8)
2013–2014	Chemnitzer FC	1	(0)
2014–2016	FSV Zwickau	58	(6)
2016–2018	Preußen Münster	54	(1)
2018–2020	Hallescher FC	53	(11)
2020–2022	Dynamo Dresden	41	(2)
2022–2024	MSV Duisburg	45	(4)
- * Club domestic league appearances and goals as of 17:33, 20 January 2024 (UTC)

Sebastian Mai (born 10 December 1993) is a German professional footballer who plays as a centre-back.

== Career ==
Mai began his career with Dynamo Dresden, before joining Chemnitzer FC in 2013. He made his 3. Liga debut for the club in October 2013, as a substitute for Kolja Pusch in a 1–0 defeat to Wacker Burghausen. At the end of the 2013–14 season, he signed for FSV Zwickau, along with team-mate Toni Wachsmuth.

Mai rejoined Dynamo Dresden on a free transfer in the summer of 2020, signing a two-year contract with the club. In the summer of 2022, after being released by Dresden, he moved to MSV Duisburg.

== Personal life ==
His father Lars was a member of the Supervisory Board of Dynamo Dresden from November 2013 to September 2017. His younger brother Lukas is also a footballer.

== Career statistics ==
As of match played 20 January 2024

Appearances and goals by club, season and competition
Club	Season	League			Cup		Total	
Club	Season	Division	Apps	Goals	Apps	Goals	Apps	Goals
Chemnitzer FC	2013–14	3. Liga	1	0	—		1	0
FSV Zwickau	2014–15	Regionalliga Nordost	26	3	—		26	3
FSV Zwickau	2015–16	Regionalliga Nordost	32	3	2 (Note: Appearance in promotion playoff)	1	34	4
FSV Zwickau	Total		58	6	2	1	60	7
Preußen Münster	2016–17	3. Liga	35	0	—		35	0
Preußen Münster	2017–18	3. Liga	19	1	—		19	1
Preußen Münster	Total		54	1	0	0	54	1
Hallescher FC	2018–19	3. Liga	25	7	—		25	7
Hallescher FC	2019–20	3. Liga	28	4	1	1	29	5
Hallescher FC	Total		53	11	1	1	54	12
Dynamo Dresden	2020–21	3. Liga	25	1	1	1	26	2
Dynamo Dresden	2021–22	2. Bundesliga	16	1	—		16	1
Dynamo Dresden	Total		41	2	1	1	42	3
MSV Duisburg	2022–23	3. Liga	26	1	—		26	1
MSV Duisburg	2023–24	3. Liga	19	4	—		19	4
MSV Duisburg	Total		45	5	0	0	45	5
Career total			252	25	4	3	255	28
