= Benjamin Girth =

German footballer

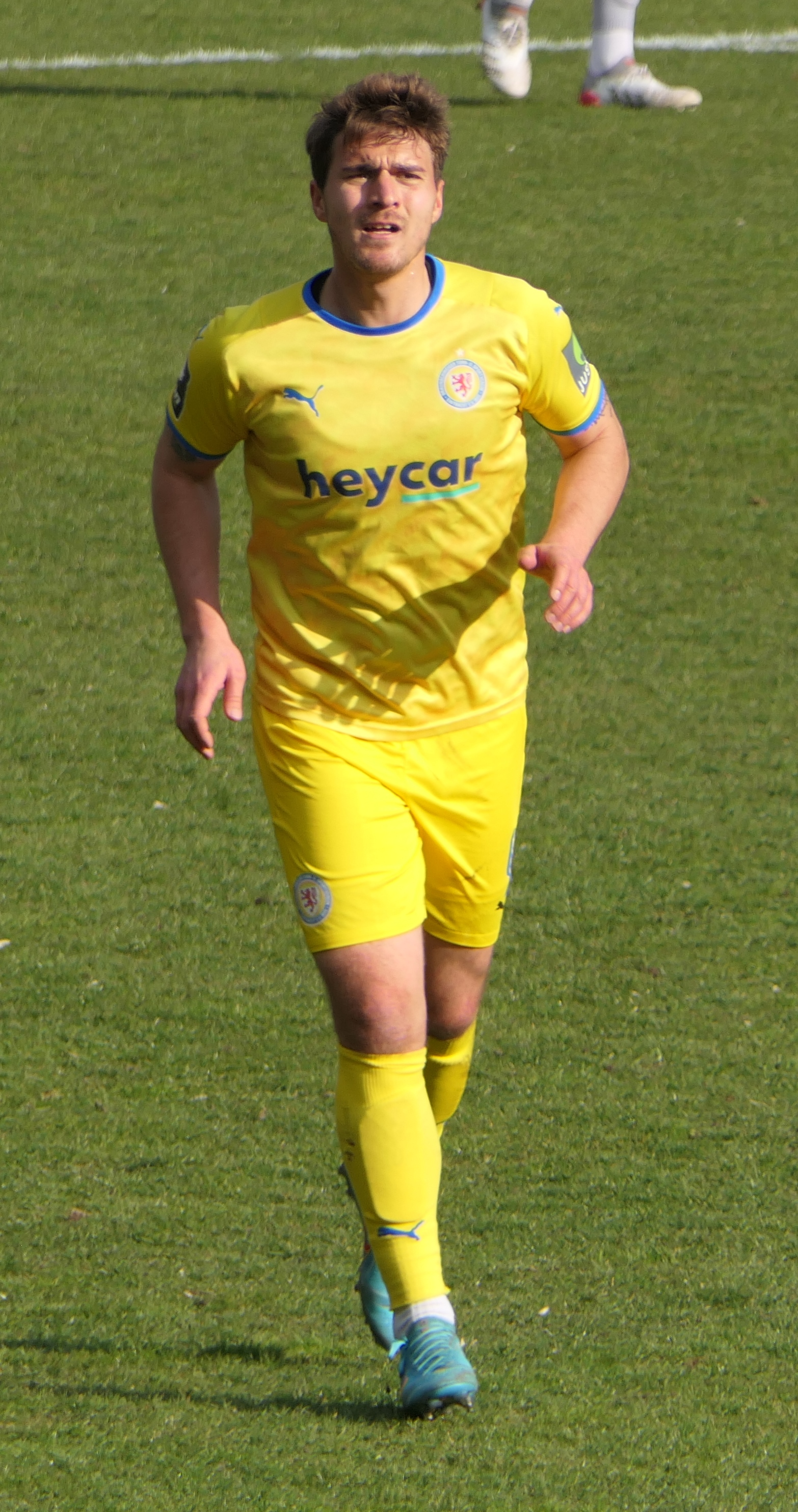

Personal information
- Date of birth: 31 January 1992 (age 34)
- Place of birth: Magdeburg, Germany
- Height: 1.81 m (5 ft 11 in)
- Position: Forward

Team information
- Current team: Hessen Kassel
- Number: 9

Youth career
- 1997–2003: Magdeburger SV Börde
- 2003–2010: 1. FC Magdeburg
- 2010–2011: RB Leipzig

Senior career*
Years	Team	Apps	(Gls)
2013–2014	VFC Plauen	25	(15)
2014–2016	Hessen Kassel	58	(15)
2016–2018	SV Meppen	64	(39)
2018–2021	Holstein Kiel	24	(2)
2018	Holstein Kiel II	1	(0)
2019–2020	→ VfL Osnabrück (loan)	34	(11)
2021–2022	Eintracht Braunschweig	22	(3)
2022–2024	MSV Duisburg	35	(6)
2024–2025	Würzburger Kickers	22	(9)
2025–	Hessen Kassel	23	(8)
- * Club domestic league appearances and goals as of 26 June 2026

Benjamin Girth (born 31 January 1992) is a German professional footballer who plays as a forward for Hessen Kassel.

== Career ==
In June 2018, 2. Bundesliga side Holstein Kiel announced the signing of Girth from 3. Liga club SV Meppen on a three-year contract. In August 2022, after a year at Eintracht Braunschweig, he moved to MSV Duisburg. He signed a two-year contract extension in June 2023. In June 2024, he signed with Würzburger Kickers.

== Career statistics ==
As of match played 3 May 2024

Appearances and goals by club, season and competition
Club	Season	League			Cup		Total	
Club	Season	Division	Apps	Goals	Apps	Goals	Apps	Goals
VFC Plauen	2013–14	Regionalliga Nordost	25	15	—		25	15
Hessen Kassel	2014–15	Regionalliga Südwest	33	11	—		33	11
Hessen Kassel	2015–16	Regionalliga Südwest	25	4	—		25	4
Hessen Kassel	Total		58	15	—		58	15
SV Meppen	2016–17	Regionalliga Nord	28	20	—		28	20
SV Meppen	2017–18	3. Liga	36	19	—		36	19
SV Meppen	Total		64	39	—		64	39
Holstein Kiel	2018–19	2. Bundesliga	7	2	0	0	7	2
Holstein Kiel	2020–21	2. Bundesliga	17	0	3 (Note: Appearances in promotion playoff)	1	20	0
Holstein Kiel	Total		24	2	3	0	27	0
VfL Osnabrück (loan)	2018–19	3. Liga	16	9	—		16	9
VfL Osnabrück (loan)	2019–20	2. Bundesliga	18	2	1	0	19	2
VfL Osnabrück (loan)	Total		34	11	1	0	35	11
Eintracht Braunschweig	2021–22	3. Liga	22	3	—		22	3
MSV Duisburg	2022–23	3. Liga	19	5	—		19	5
MSV Duisburg	2023–24	3. Liga	16	3	—		16	3
MSV Duisburg	Total		35	8	0	0	35	8
Career total			261	93	4	1	265	94
