= Niklas Kölle =

German footballer

Personal information
- Date of birth: 17 November 1999 (age 26)
- Place of birth: Wolfsburg, Germany
- Height: 1.80 m (5 ft 11 in)
- Positions: Left-back; left winger

Team information
- Current team: Hansa Rostock
- Number: 32

Youth career
- TuS Ehra-Lessien
- 2012–2016: VfL Wolfsburg
- 2016–2018: Mainz 05

Senior career*
Years	Team	Apps	(Gls)
2018–2020	Mainz 05 II	51	(0)
2020–2022	TSG Hoffenheim II	62	(0)
2022–2024	MSV Duisburg	55	(10)
2024–2026	SSV Ulm	32	(3)
2025	→ VfL Osnabrück (loan)	19	(0)
2026–	Hansa Rostock	0	(0)

International career
2016–2017	Germany U18	6	(1)
- * Club domestic league appearances and goals as of 30 May 2026

Niklas Kölle (born 17 November 1999) is a German professional footballer who plays as a left-back or left winger for 3. Liga club Hansa Rostock.

== Career ==
Kölle made his debut for Mainz 05 II in 2018. In the summer of 2022, he moved to MSV Duisburg. He made his professional debut for MSV Duisburg on 22 May 2022, in the 3. Liga match against VfL Osnabrück. After the 2024–25 season, he signed with SSV Ulm. In the first half of the 2024–25 season, he only made one cup appearance for SSV Ulm. On 23 December 2024, Kölle moved on loan to VfL Osnabrück in 3. Liga.

== Career statistics ==
As of 19 May 2024

Appearances and goals by club, season and competition
Club	Season	Division	League		Cup		Continental		Total	
Club	Season	Division	Apps	Goals	Apps	Goals	Apps	Goals	Apps	Goals
Mainz 05 II	2018–19	Regionalliga Südwest	31	0	—		—		31	0
Mainz 05 II	2019–20	Regionalliga Südwest	20	0	—		—		20	0
Mainz 05 II	Total		51	0	—		—		51	0
1899 Hoffenheim II	2020–21	Regionalliga Südwest	32	0	—		—		32	0
1899 Hoffenheim II	2021–22	Regionalliga Südwest	30	0	—		—		30	0
1899 Hoffenheim II	Total		62	0	—		—		62	0
MSV Duisburg	2022–23	3. Liga	29	5	—		—		29	5
MSV Duisburg	2023–24	3. Liga	26	5	—		—		26	5
MSV Duisburg	Total		55	10	0	0	—		55	10
Career total			168	10	0	0	—		168	10
