= Niclas Stierlin =

German footballer

Personal information
- Date of birth: 22 January 2000 (age 26)
- Place of birth: Mannheim, Germany
- Height: 1.82 m (6 ft 0 in)
- Position: Midfielder

Team information
- Current team: Hallescher FC
- Number: 13

Youth career
- FV Hofheim
- VfB Lampertheim
- –2008: Waldhof Mannheim
- 2008–2017: 1. FC Kaiserslautern
- 2017–2019: RB Leipzig

Senior career*
Years	Team	Apps	(Gls)
2018–2019	RB Leipzig	0	(0)
2019–2021	SpVgg Unterhaching	49	(3)
2021–2024	MSV Duisburg	79	(2)
2024–	Hallescher FC	74	(18)

International career
2017–2018	Germany U18	4	(2)
2018	Germany U19	2	(0)
- * Club domestic league appearances and goals as of 23 September 2026

Niclas Stierlin (born 22 January 2000) is a German professional footballer who plays as a midfielder for Hallescher FC.

== Club career ==
Stierlin made his professional debut for RB Leipzig on 26 July 2018, coming on as a substitute in the 85th minute for Bruma in the UEFA Europa League qualifying match against Swedish club BK Häcken of the Allsvenskan, which finished as a 4–0 home win.

After playing two years at SpVgg Unterhaching, he joined MSV Duisburg in the summer of 2021. In the summer of 2024, he moved to Hallescher FC.

== Career statistics ==
As of 29 June 2026

Appearances and goals by club, season and competition
Club	Season	League			Cup		Other		Total	
Club	Season	Division	Apps	Goals	Apps	Goals	Apps	Goals	Apps	Goals
RB Leipzig	2018–19	Bundesliga	0	0	—		2 (Note: Appearances in Europa League playoff)	0	2	0
SpVgg Unterhaching	2019–20	3. Liga	23	1	—		—		23	1
SpVgg Unterhaching	2020–21	3. Liga	26	2	—		—		26	2
SpVgg Unterhaching	Total		49	3	—		—		49	3
MSV Duisburg	2021–22	3. Liga	34	0	—		—		34	0
MSV Duisburg	2022–23	3. Liga	28	1	—		—		28	1
MSV Duisburg	2023–24	3. Liga	17	1	—		—		17	1
MSV Duisburg	Total		79	2	0	0	—		79	2
Hallescher FC	2024–25	Regionalliga Nordeast	31	3	1	0	4 (Note: Appearances in Sachsen-Anhalt-Pokal playoff)	0	36	3
Hallescher FC	2025–26	Regionalliga Nordeast	33	8	1	0	5 (Note: Appearances in Sachsen-Anhalt-Pokal playoff)	0	39	8
Hallescher FC	Total		64	11	2	0	9	0	75	11
Career total			192	16	2	0	11	0	205	16
