= Caspar Jander =

German footballer

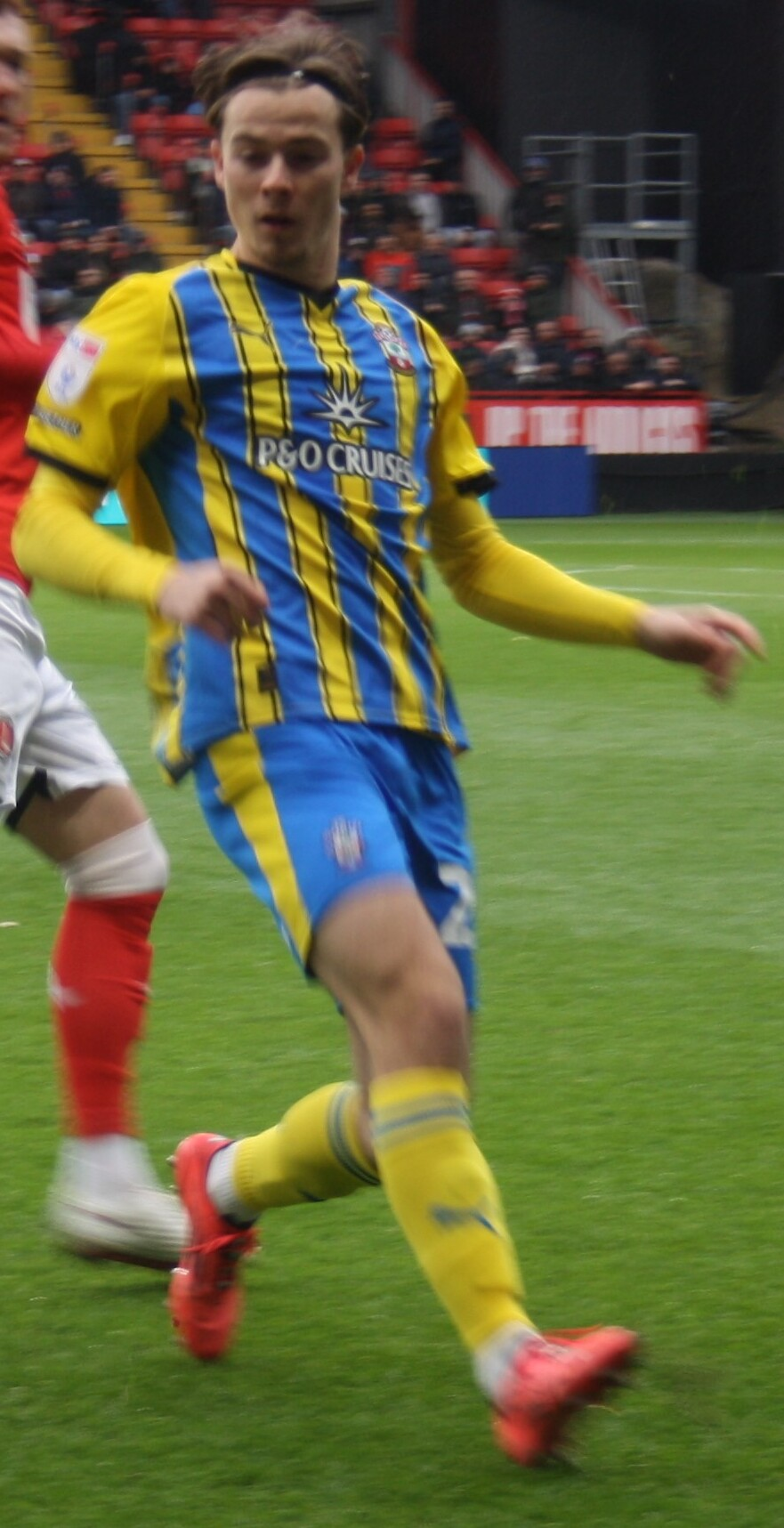
- Jander with Southampton in 2025

Personal information
- Date of birth: 23 March 2003 (age 23)
- Place of birth: Münster, Germany
- Height: 1.83 m (6 ft 0 in)
- Position: Central midfielder

Team information
- Current team: Southampton
- Number: 8

Youth career
- 2008–2013: DJK Germania Mauritz
- 2013–2015: Preußen Münster
- 2015–2017: Borussia Dortmund
- 2017–2021: Schalke 04
- 2021: MSV Duisburg

Senior career*
Years	Team	Apps	(Gls)
2021–2024	MSV Duisburg	60	(2)
2024–2025	1. FC Nürnberg	33	(3)
2025–	Southampton	39	(2)

International career^{‡}
2023	Germany U20	6	(0)
2025	Germany U21	3	(0)
Medal record
Men's football
Representing Germany
UEFA European Under-21 Championship
Runner-up	2025 Slovakia
- * Club domestic league appearances and goals as of 16:41, 24 October 2026 (UTC) ‡ National team caps and goals as of 12:04, 19 June 2025 (UTC)

Caspar Jander (born 23 March 2003) is a German professional footballer who plays as a central midfielder for EFL Championship club Southampton.

He began his career with MSV Duisburg in 2021. Jander joined 1. FC Nürnberg in 2024 before moving to Southampton in August 2025. He has represented his country at under-20 and under-21 level.

== Club career ==
=== Early career ===
Jander made his professional debut for MSV Duisburg on 23 January 2022, in the 3. Liga home match against 1. FC Saarbrücken. He signed a new contract on 2 February 2022, running until 2024. His first goal came in a 3–2 win over 1. FC Saarbrücken on 14 January 2023. In January 2024, Jander agreed to join 1. FC Nürnberg, starting from the 2024–25 season.

=== Southampton ===
On 29 August 2025, Jander joined Southampton on a four-year contract, for a reported transfer fee of £10.4 million (12m euros). He made his debut for the club on 14 September in a 0–0 draw with Portsmouth. On 8 November, Jander scored his first goal for the club in a 3–1 victory against Sheffield Wednesday. He ended the 2025–26 season with 43 appearances in all competitions.

During a pre-season friendly against Eastleigh on 18 July 2026, Jander suffered an injury and was substituted in the first-half. He subsequently missed the entirety of Southampton's pre-season fixtures. On 4 September, head coach Tonda Eckert revealed Jander had suffered a setback that delayed his return after he continued to struggle with the quad injury he sustained against Eastleigh. He made his return from injury on 11 October in a 1–0 victory against Portsmouth after he replaced Cyle Larin in the 72nd minute.

== International career ==
Jander has represented Germany at under-20 and under-21 level. In March 2025, he was named in the under-21 squad for the first time. On 21 March, Jander made his debut for the under-21s in a 1–0 victory against Slovakia U21s.

== Career statistics ==
As of 24 October 2026

Appearances and goals by club, season and competition
Club	Season	League			National cup (Note: Includes DFB-Pokal, FA Cup)		League cup (Note: Includes EFL Cup)		Other		Total	
Club	Season	Division	Apps	Goals	Apps	Goals	Apps	Goals	Apps	Goals	Apps	Goals
MSV Duisburg	2021–22	3. Liga	10	0	—		—		—		10	0
MSV Duisburg	2022–23	3. Liga	29	1	—		—		—		29	1
MSV Duisburg	2023–24	3. Liga	21	1	—		—		—		21	1
MSV Duisburg	Total		60	2	0	0	—		—		60	2
1. FC Nürnberg	2024–25	2. Bundesliga	32	3	2	0	—		—		34	3
1. FC Nürnberg	2025–26	2. Bundesliga	1	0	1	0	—		—		2	0
1. FC Nürnberg	Total		33	3	3	0	—		—		36	3
Southampton	2025–26	Championship	36	2	4	0	1	0	2 (Note: Appearances in Championship play-offs)	0	43	2
Southampton	2026–27	Championship	3	0	0	0	0	0	—		3	0
Southampton	Total		39	2	4	0	1	0	2	0	46	2
Career total			132	7	7	0	1	0	2	0	142	7

== Honours ==
Germany U21

- UEFA European Under-21 Championship runner-up: 2025
