= Alaa Bakir =

German footballer

Personal information
- Full name: Alaa Hamad Bakir
- Date of birth: 15 January 2001 (age 25)
- Place of birth: Münster, Germany
- Height: 1.79 m (5 ft 10 in)
- Position: Midfielder

Youth career
- –2020: Borussia Dortmund

Senior career*
Years	Team	Apps	(Gls)
2020–2021	Borussia Dortmund II	40	(4)
2021–2024	MSV Duisburg	60	(6)
2024–2026	Emmen	38	(4)
- * Club domestic league appearances and goals as of 28 April 2026

Alaa Hamad Bakir (born 15 January 2001) is a German professional footballer who plays as a midfielder.

== Career ==
After spending several years at Borussia Dortmund, he moved to MSV Duisburg in the summer of 2021. He made his professional debut in the 3. Liga on 8 August 2021, in the home match against TSV Havelse. In the summer of 2024, he moved to FC Emmen.

== Career statistics ==
As of 19 May 2024

Appearances and goals by club, season and competition
Club	Season	Division	League		Cup		Continental		Total	
Club	Season	Division	Apps	Goals	Apps	Goals	Apps	Goals	Apps	Goals
Borussia Dortmund II	2019–20	Regionalliga West	1	0	—		—		1	0
Borussia Dortmund II	2020–21	Regionalliga West	39	4	—		—		39	4
Borussia Dortmund II	Total		40	4	0	0	0	0	40	4
MSV Duisburg	2021–22	3. Liga	30	2	—		—		30	2
MSV Duisburg	2022–23	3. Liga	14	2	—		—		14	2
MSV Duisburg	2023–24	3. Liga	16	2	—		—		16	2
MSV Duisburg	Total		60	6	0	0	—		60	6
Career total			100	10	0	0	—		100	10
