= Phillip König =

German footballer

Personal information
- Date of birth: 22 March 2000 (age 26)
- Place of birth: Suhl, Germany
- Height: 1.88 m (6 ft 2 in)
- Position: Forward

Team information
- Current team: FSV Luckenwalde
- Number: 26

Youth career
- –2016: Rot-Weiß Erfurt
- 2016–2019: VfL Wolfsburg

Senior career*
| Years | Team | Apps | (Gls) |
| 2019–2020 | VfL Wolfsburg II | 6 | (0) |
| 2020–2022 | Holstein Kiel II | 32 | (9) |
| 2022–2024 | MSV Duisburg | 25 | (0) |
| 2024 | 1. FC Bocholt | 23 | (4) |
| 2025– | FSV Luckenwalde | 33 | (2) |
- * Club domestic league appearances and goals as of 22 June 2026

Phillip König (born 22 March 2000) is a German professional footballer who plays as a forward for FSV Luckenwalde.

== Career ==
König started playing for the second teams of VfL Wolfsburg and Holstein Kiel. In the summer of 2022, König moved to MSV Duisburg. He made his professional debut for MSV Duisburg on 1 October 2022, in the 3. Liga match against Hallescher FC. He left Duisburg in January 2024 and joined 1. FC Bocholt. On 7 January 2025, König joined FSV 63 Luckenwalde.

== Career statistics ==
As of 17 December 2023

Appearances and goals by club, season and competition
| Club | Season | Division | League | | Cup | | Continental | | Total | |
| Club | Season | Division | Apps | Goals | Apps | Goals | Apps | Goals | Apps | Goals |
|---|---|---|---|---|---|---|---|---|---|---|
| VfL Wolfsburg II | 2019–20 | Regionalliga Nord | 6 | 0 | — | | — | | 6 | 0 |
| Holstein Kiel II | 2019–20 | Regionalliga Nord | 2 | 0 | — | | — | | 2 | 0 |
| Holstein Kiel II | 2020–21 | Regionalliga Nord | 5 | 0 | — | | — | | 5 | 0 |
| Holstein Kiel II | 2021–22 | Regionalliga Nord | 25 | 9 | — | | — | | 25 | 9 |
| Holstein Kiel II | Total | | 32 | 9 | — | | — | | 32 | 9 |
| MSV Duisburg | 2022–23 | 3. Liga | 18 | 0 | — | | — | | 18 | 0 |
| MSV Duisburg | 2023–24 | 3. Liga | 7 | 0 | — | | — | | 7 | 0 |
| MSV Duisburg | Total | | 25 | 0 | 0 | 0 | — | | 25 | 0 |
| Career total | | | 63 | 9 | 0 | 0 | — | | 63 | 9 |
