= Tim Köther =

German footballer (born 2001)

Personal information
- Date of birth: 22 February 2001 (age 25)
- Place of birth: Aachen, Germany
- Height: 1.75 m (5 ft 9 in)
- Position: Midfielder

Youth career
- –2019: Alemannia Aachen
- 2019–2020: Fortuna Düsseldorf

Senior career*
Years	Team	Apps	(Gls)
2020–2022	Fortuna Düsseldorf	1	(0)
2020–2022	Fortuna Düsseldorf II	53	(7)
2022–2024	1. FC Heidenheim	1	(0)
2023–2024	→ MSV Duisburg (loan)	28	(1)
2024–2026	Roda JC	26	(0)
- * Club domestic league appearances and goals as of 24 April 2026

Tim Köther (born 22 February 2001) is a German professional footballer who plays as a midfielder.

== Career ==
Köther moved from Fortuna Düsseldorf to 1. FC Heidenheim in 2022. A year later, he was loaned to MSV Duisburg for the 2022–23 season.

On 1 August 2024, Köther signed a two-year contract with Roda JC in the Netherlands after his contract with Heidenheim was terminated. He made his competitive debut for the club on 12 August, starting in the season's opening fixture under manager Bas Sibum, as Roda suffered a heavy 6–1 defeat to Jong AZ.

== Career statistics ==
As of match played 16 September 2024

Appearances and goals by club, season and competition
Club	Season	League			Cup		Other		Total	
Club	Season	Division	Apps	Goals	Apps	Goals	Apps	Goals	Apps	Goals
Fortuna Düsseldorf	2020–21	2. Bundesliga	0	0	0	0	—		0	0
Fortuna Düsseldorf	2021–22	2. Bundesliga	1	0	0	0	—		1	0
Fortuna Düsseldorf	Total		1	0	0	0	—		1	0
Fortuna Düsseldorf II	2020–21	Regionalliga West	22	1	—		—		22	1
Fortuna Düsseldorf II	2021–22	Regionalliga West	31	6	—		—		31	6
Fortuna Düsseldorf II	Total		53	7	—		—		53	7
1. FC Heidenheim	2022–23	2. Bundesliga	1	0	0	0	—		1	0
MSV Duisburg (loan)	2023–24	3. Liga	28	1	—		—		28	1
Roda JC	2024–25	Eerste Divisie	4	0	0	0	—		4	0
Career total			87	8	0	0	—		87	8
