= Jonas Michelbrink =

German footballer

Personal information
- Date of birth: 23 June 2001 (age 25)
- Place of birth: Hanover, Germany
- Height: 1.80 m (5 ft 11 in)
- Position: Midfielder

Team information
- Current team: Fortuna Köln
- Number: 16

Youth career
- –2014: Berolina Stralau
- 2014–2020: Hertha BSC

Senior career*
Years	Team	Apps	(Gls)
2020–2022	Hertha BSC II	45	(4)
2021–2022	Hertha BSC	2	(0)
2022–2025	MSV Duisburg	63	(2)
2025–	Fortuna Köln	23	(0)

International career
2017	Germany U17	1	(0)
- * Club domestic league appearances and goals as of 18:41, 4 June 2026 (UTC)

Jonas Michelbrink (born 23 June 2001) is a German professional footballer who plays as a midfielder for 3. Liga club Fortuna Köln.

== Club career ==
Michelbrink made his professional debut for Hertha BSC in the Bundesliga on 12 May 2021, coming on as a substitute in the 76th minute for Javairô Dilrosun against Schalke 04. The away match finished as a 2–1 win. In August 2022, he moved to MSV Duisburg. He stayed at Duisburg after the 2023–24 after they were relegated to the Regionalliga West. In September 2025, he moved to Fortuna Köln.

== International career ==
Michelbrink made one appearance for the Germany national under-17 team in October 2017 against Denmark.

== Career statistics ==
As of match played 16 May 2026

Appearances and goals by club, season and competition
Club	Season	League			DFB-Pokal		Total	
Club	Season	Division	Apps	Goals	Apps	Goals	Apps	Goals
Hertha BSC II	2020–21	Regionalliga Nordost	11	1	—		11	1
Hertha BSC II	2021–22	Regionalliga Nordost	31	2	—		31	2
Hertha BSC II	2022–23	Regionalliga Nordost	3	1	—		3	1
Hertha BSC II	Total		45	4	—		45	4
Hertha BSC	2020–21	Bundesliga	2	0	0	0	2	0
MSV Duisburg	2022–23	3. Liga	13	1	—		13	1
MSV Duisburg	2023–24	3. Liga	26	0	—		3	0
MSV Duisburg	2024–25	Regionalliga West	23	1	—		23	1
MSV Duisburg	2025–26	3. Liga	0	0	—		0	0
MSV Duisburg	Total		62	2	—		62	2
Fortuna Köln	2025–26	Regionalliga West	23	0	—		23	0
Career total			133	7	0	0	133	7

== Honours ==
Fortuna Köln

- Regionalliga West: 2025–26
