= Julian Hettwer =

German footballer (born 2003)

Personal information
- Date of birth: 15 June 2003 (age 23)
- Place of birth: Bochum, Germany
- Height: 1.84 m (6 ft 0 in)
- Position: Forward

Team information
- Current team: Austria Wien
- Number: 20

Youth career
- 2012–2017: VfL Bochum
- 2017–2018: Schalke 04
- 2018–: MSV Duisburg

Senior career*
Years	Team	Apps	(Gls)
2020–2023	MSV Duisburg	60	(7)
2023–2025	Borussia Dortmund II	62	(20)
2025–2026	Fortuna Düsseldorf	7	(0)
2026–	Austria Wien	0	(0)

International career^{‡}
2021	Germany U19	1	(0)
- * Club domestic league appearances and goals as of 18 May 2026 ‡ National team caps and goals as of 16:45, 16 November 2021 (UTC)

Julian Hettwer (born 15 June 2003) is a German professional footballer who plays as a forward for Austrian Bundesliga club Austria Wien.

== Career ==
Hettwer made his professional debut for MSV Duisburg on 14 November 2020, in the 3. Liga away match against Türkgücü München. He signed a new contract on 1 June 2021. A new contract was signed on 2 February 2022, running until 2024. In the summer of 2023, he was transferred to Borussia Dortmund II.

On 28 May 2025, Hettwer signed with Fortuna Düsseldorf.

On 24 June 2026, Hettwer moved to Austria Wien on a four-year deal.

== Career statistics ==
As of 1 July 2024

Appearances and goals by club, season and competition
Club	Season	Division	League		Cup		Continental		Total	
Club	Season	Division	Apps	Goals	Apps	Goals	Apps	Goals	Apps	Goals
MSV Duisburg	2020–21	3. Liga	9	1	0	0	—		9	1
MSV Duisburg	2021–22	3. Liga	26	1	—		—		26	1
MSV Duisburg	2022–23	3. Liga	25	5	—		—		25	5
MSV Duisburg	Total		60	7	0	0	0	0	60	7
Borussia Dortmund II	2023–24	3. Liga	36	7	—		—		36	7
Borussia Dortmund II	2024–25	3. Liga	0	0	—		—		0	0
Borussia Dortmund II	Total		36	7	0	0	0	0	36	7
Career total			96	14	0	0	0	0	96	14
