= Marvin Ajani =

German footballer

Personal information
- Date of birth: 4 October 1993 (age 33)
- Place of birth: Ratingen, Germany
- Height: 1.88 m (6 ft 2 in)
- Positions: Right midfielder; right-back

Team information
- Current team: 1. FC Köln II
- Number: 22

Youth career
- Borussia Mönchengladbach
- –2010: FC Wegberg-Beeck
- 2010–2012: Alemannia Mariadorf
- 2012: Alemannia Aachen

Senior career*
Years	Team	Apps	(Gls)
2012–2014	Alemannia Aachen II	4	(0)
2013–2014	Alemannia Aachen	23	(0)
2014–2016	Fortuna Düsseldorf II	57	(5)
2015–2016	Fortuna Düsseldorf	1	(0)
2016–2019	Hallescher FC	97	(14)
2019–2021	Wehen Wiesbaden	44	(0)
2021–2023	MSV Duisburg	68	(4)
2023–2024	Hallescher FC	10	(0)
2024–2025	Teutonia Ottensen	30	(1)
2025–	1. FC Köln II	40	(7)
- * Club domestic league appearances and goals as of 23 September 2026

Marvin Ajani (born 4 October 1993) is a German professional footballer who plays as a right midfielder or right-back for Regionalliga West club 1. FC Köln II.

== Career ==
After several years at Fortuna Düsseldorf, Alemannia Aachen, Hallescher FC and Wehen Wiesbaden, Ajani joined MSV Duisburg for the 2021–22 season. In May 2023, it was announced that he would leave Duisburg after the 2022–23 season.

On 17 August 2023, Ajani returned to Hallescher FC.

Ajani signed with Regionalliga Nord club FC Teutonia Ottensen in July 2024.

== Career statistics ==
As of match played 16 May 2026

Appearances and goals by club, season and competition
Club	Season	League			DFB-Pokal		Other		Total	
Club	Season	Division	Apps	Goals	Apps	Goals	Apps	Goals	Apps	Goals
Alemannia Aachen	2012–13	3. Liga	6	0	—		—		6	0
Alemannia Aachen	2013–14	Regionalliga West	17	0	—		—		17	0
Alemannia Aachen	Total		23	0	—		—		23	0
Alemannia Aachen II	2012–13	Oberliga Mittelrhein	1	0	—		—		1	0
Fortuna Düsseldorf	2014–15	2. Bundesliga	1	0	—		—		1	0
Fortuna Düsseldorf II	2014–15	Regionalliga West	24	1	—		—		24	1
Fortuna Düsseldorf II	2015–16	Regionalliga West	33	4	—		—		33	4
Fortuna Düsseldorf II	Total		57	5	—		—		57	5
Hallescher FC	2016–17	3. Liga	31	5	2	0	—		33	5
Hallescher FC	2017–18	3. Liga	30	4	—		—		30	4
Hallescher FC	2018–19	3. Liga	36	5	—		—		37	5
Hallescher FC	Total		97	14	2	0	—		99	14
Wehen Wiesbaden	2019–20	2. Bundeslgia	20	0	1	0	—		21	0
Wehen Wiesbaden	2020–21	3. Liga	24	0	2	0	—		26	0
Wehen Wiesbaden	Total		44	0	3	0	—		47	0
MSV Duisburg	2021–22	3. Liga	33	3	—		—		33	3
MSV Duisburg	2022–23	3. Liga	35	1	—		—		35	1
MSV Duisburg	Total		68	4	0	0	—		68	4
Hallescher FC	2023–24	3. Liga	10	0	0	0	—		10	0
Teutonia Ottensen	2024–25	Regionalliga Nord	30	1	—		—		30	1
1. FC Köln II	2025–26	Regionalliga West	32	6	—		—		32	6
Career total			365	30	5	0	—		370	30
