= Jonas Fedl =

German footballer (born 1999)

Personal information
- Date of birth: 5 February 1999 (age 27)
- Place of birth: Andernach, Germany
- Height: 1.88 m (6 ft 2 in)
- Position: Midfielder

Team information
- Current team: SV Meppen
- Number: 5

Youth career
- –2015: TuS Koblenz
- 2015–2018: Mainz 05

Senior career*
Years	Team	Apps	(Gls)
2018–2021	Mainz 05 II	64	(5)
2021–	SV Meppen	111	(2)
- * Club domestic league appearances and goals as of 20 June 2026

Jonas Fedl (born 5 February 1999) is a German professional footballer who plays as a midfielder for club SV Meppen.

== Career ==
Fedl started his youth career at TuS Koblenz before joining Mainz 05 in 2015. He made his senior debut for Mainz 05 II in March 2019. After 64 appearances and five goals for Mainz 05 II, he signed for 3. Liga club SV Meppen on a two-year contract in June 2021.
