= Thomas Pledl =

German footballer (born 1994)

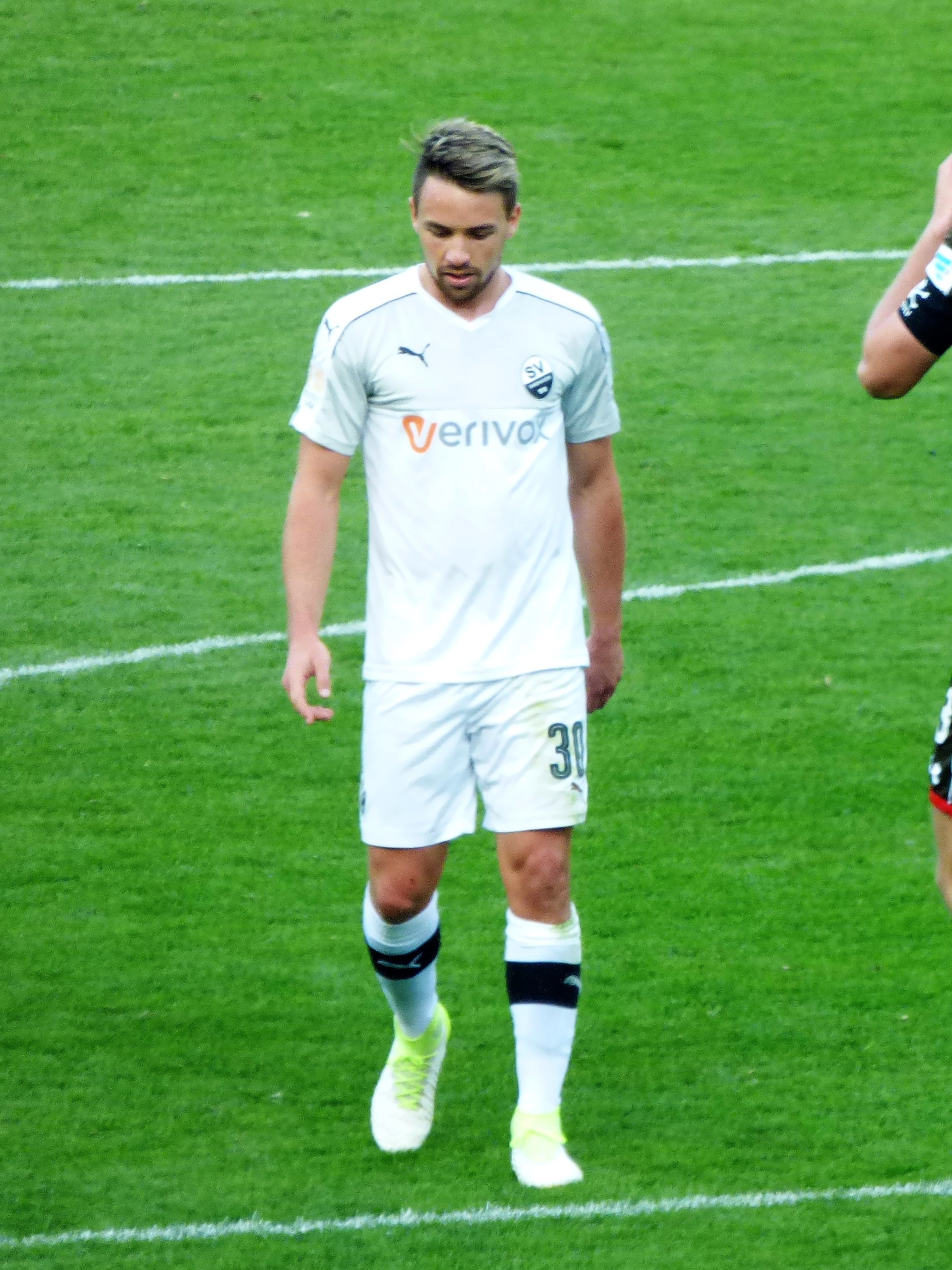
- Pledl playing for SV Sandhausen in 2017

Personal information
- Date of birth: 23 May 1994 (age 32)
- Place of birth: Bischofsmais, Germany
- Height: 1.74 m (5 ft 9 in)
- Position: Midfielder

Youth career
- SV Bischofsmais
- –2009: SpVgg Grün-Weiss Deggendorf
- 2009–2012: 1860 Munich

Senior career*
Years	Team	Apps	(Gls)
2012–2013	Greuther Fürth II	16	(1)
2012–2014	Greuther Fürth	36	(0)
2015–2019	FC Ingolstadt	69	(7)
2015	→ FC Ingolstadt II	9	(1)
2016–2017	→ SV Sandhausen (loan)	44	(4)
2019–2022	Fortuna Düsseldorf	33	(1)
2020–2021	Fortuna Düsseldorf II	2	(0)
2023	Waldhof Mannheim	19	(2)
2023–2024	MSV Duisburg	29	(1)
2025	MSV Duisburg	0	(0)

International career
2011–2012	Germany U18	8	(2)
2012–2013	Germany U19	13	(3)
2013–2014	Germany U20	11	(1)
- * Club domestic league appearances and goals as of 14:59, 12 May 2024 (UTC)

Thomas Pledl (born 23 May 1994) is a German former professional footballer who played as a midfielder.

== Club career ==
Pledl went through the renowned youth ranks of 1860 Munich before leaving the club in 2012 to join Greuther Fürth. For Greuther Fürth he made his Bundesliga debut in November of the same year, as a substitute for Felix Klaus in a 2–0 defeat to Hannover 96.

In January 2015, after two and a half years with Fürth, he moved to fellow 2. Bundesliga club FC Ingolstadt who were battling for promotion to the Bundesliga at that time. He signed a contract for four and a half years until 2020. He was loaned to SV Sandhausen on 16 January 2016.

On 10 April 2019, Fortuna Düsseldorf confirmed that Pledl would join the club from the 2019–20 season. He penned a two-year contract.

On 15 January 2023, Pledl signed with Waldhof Mannheim, and left after a half year again to join MSV Duisburg. After the 2023–24 season, his contract expired but he returned to Duisburg in January 2025.

== Career statistics ==
As of 12 May 2024

Appearances and goals by club, season and competition
Club	Season	League			Cup		Continental		Total	
Club	Season	Division	Apps	Goals	Apps	Goals	Apps	Goals	Apps	Goals
Greuther Fürth	2012–13	Bundesliga	7	0	—		—		7	0
Greuther Fürth	2013–14	2. Bundesliga	16	0	1	0	—		17	0
Greuther Fürth	2014–15	2. Bundesliga	13	0	—		—		13	0
Greuther Fürth	Total		36	0	1	0	0	0	37	0
Greuther Fürth II	2012–13	Regionalliga	12	1	—		—		12	1
Greuther Fürth II	2013–14	Regionalliga	4	0	—		—		4	0
Greuther Fürth II	Total		16	1	0	0	0	0	16	1
FC Ingolstadt	2014–15	2. Bundesliga	11	0	0	0	—		11	0
FC Ingolstadt	2017–18	2. Bundesliga	31	4	1	0	—		32	4
FC Ingolstadt	2018–19	2. Bundesliga	27	3	0	0	—		27	3
FC Ingolstadt	Total		69	7	1	0	0	0	70	7
FC Ingolstadt II	2015–16	Regionalliga	9	1	—		—		9	1
SV Sandhausen (loan)	2015–16	2. Bundesliga	12	0	0	0	—		12	0
SV Sandhausen (loan)	2016–17	2. Bundesliga	32	4	3	0	—		35	4
SV Sandhausen (loan)	Total		44	4	3	0	0	0	47	4
Fortuna Düsseldorf	2019–20	Bundesliga	5	0	1	0	—		6	0
Fortuna Düsseldorf	2020–21	2. Bundesliga	23	1	2	1	—		25	2
Fortuna Düsseldorf	2021–22	2. Bundesliga	5	0	0	0	—		5	0
Fortuna Düsseldorf	Total		33	1	3	1	0	0	36	2
Fortuna Düsseldorf II	2019–20	Regionalliga	1	0	—		—		1	0
Fortuna Düsseldorf II	2021–22	Regionalliga	1	0	—		—		1	0
Fortuna Düsseldorf II	Total		2	0	0	0	0	0	2	0
Waldhof Mannheim	2022–23	3. Liga	19	2	—		—		19	2
MSV Duisburg	2023–24	3. Liga	29	1	—		—		29	1
MSV Duisburg	2024–25	Regionalliga West	0	0	—		—		0	0
Career total			257	17	8	1	0	0	265	18

== Honours ==
Individual

- Fritz Walter Medal U18 Silver: 2012
