= Philip Fahrner =

German footballer

Personal information
- Date of birth: 2 January 2003 (age 23)
- Place of birth: Freudenstadt, Germany
- Height: 1.75 m (5 ft 9 in)
- Position: Midfielder

Team information
- Current team: 1. FC Saarbrücken
- Number: 2

Youth career
- –2017: SSV Reutlingen
- 2017–2021: SC Freiburg

Senior career*
Years	Team	Apps	(Gls)
2021–2024	SC Freiburg II	59	(4)
2024–	1. FC Saarbrücken	55	(0)
- * Club domestic league appearances and goals as of 00:31, 28 October 2026 (UTC)

Philip Fahrner (born 2 January 2003) is a German professional footballer who plays as a midfielder for 3. Liga club 1. FC Saarbrücken.

== Career ==
On 13 May 2024, Fahrner signed a contract with 1. FC Saarbrücken in 3. Liga for the 2024–25 season.

== Career statistics ==
As of match played 25 October 2026

Appearances and goals by club, season and competition
Club	Season	League			DFB-Pokal		Other		Total	
Club	Season	Division	Apps	Goals	Apps	Goals	Apps	Goals	Apps	Goals
SC Freiburg II	2021–22	3. Liga	4	0	—		0	0	4	0
SC Freiburg II	2022–23	3. Liga	28	2	—		0	0	28	2
SC Freiburg II	2023–24	3. Liga	27	2	—		0	0	27	2
SC Freiburg II	Total		59	4	0	0	0	0	59	4
1. FC Saarbrücken	2024–25	3. Liga	28	0	—		2 (Note: Appearances in 2. Bundesliga relegation playoffs)	0	30	0
1. FC Saarbrücken	2025–26	3. Liga	16	0	—		0	0	16	0
1. FC Saarbrücken	2026–27	3. Liga	11	0	1	1	0	0	12	1
1. FC Saarbrücken	Total		55	0	1	1	2	0	58	1
Career total			114	4	1	1	2	0	117	5
