= 2023–24 SSV Jahn Regensburg season =

SSV Jahn Regensburg
2023–24 season
- Manager: Joe Enochs
- Stadium: Jahnstadion Regensburg
- 3. Liga: 3rd (promoted via play-offs)
- Promotion play-offs: Winners
- DFB-Pokal: First round

The 2023–24 season was SSV Jahn Regensburg's 117th season in existence and first one back in the 3. Liga. They also competed in the DFB-Pokal.

== Players ==
=== First-team squad ===
As of 9 August 2023

Note: Flags indicate national team as defined under FIFA eligibility rules; some limited exceptions apply. Players may hold more than one non-FIFA nationality.

No.	Pos.	Nation	Player
1	GK	GER	Felix Gebhardt
3	DF	GER	Bryan Hein
4	DF	GER	Florian Ballas
5	MF	GER	Rasim Bulić
6	DF	GER	Benedikt Saller
7	FW	GER	Oscar Schönfelder
8	MF	GER	Andreas Geipl (captain)
9	FW	GER	Eric Hottmann
10	MF	GER	Christian Viet
11	DF	GER	Konrad Faber
12	GK	GER	Leon Ćuk
13	DF	GER	Alexander Bittroff
14	DF	GER	Robin Ziegele

No.	Pos.	Nation	Player
16	DF	GER	Louis Breunig (on loan from Nürnberg)
18	MF	GER	Niclas Anspach
19	MF	GER	Christian Schmidt
20	FW	GER	Noah Ganaus
21	MF	GER	Tobias Eisenhuth
22	FW	GER	Noel Eichinger
23	FW	GER	Jannik Graf
27	MF	GER	Dominik Kother
29	FW	GER	Elias Huth
32	GK	GER	Alexander Weidinger
36	FW	GER	Kelvin Onuigwe

== Pre-season and friendlies ==
Win Draw Loss

July 2023 Friendly	(Germany)	v	(Germany) SSV Jahn Regensburg
CEST (UTC+2)

== Competitions ==
=== Overall record ===
Competition	First match	Last match	Starting round	Final position	Record							
Competition	First match	Last match	Starting round	Final position	Pld	W	D	L	GF	GA	GD	Win %
3. Liga	5 August 2023	18 May 2024	Matchday 1	3rd	38	17	12	9	51	42	+9	44.74
DFB-Pokal	14 August 2023	14 August 2023	First round	First round	1	0	0	1	1	2	−1	0.00
Total					39	17	12	10	52	44	+8	43.59

Source: Soccerway

=== 3. Liga ===
==== League table ====
Pos	Team	Pld	W	D	L	GF	GA	GD	Pts	Promotion, qualification or relegation
1	SSV Ulm (C, P)	38	23	8	7	65	38	+27	77	Promotion to 2. Bundesliga and qualification for DFB-Pokal
2	Preußen Münster (P)	38	19	10	9	68	49	+19	67	Promotion to 2. Bundesliga and qualification for DFB-Pokal
3	Jahn Regensburg (O, P)	38	17	12	9	51	42	+9	63	Qualification for promotion play-offs and DFB-Pokal
4	Dynamo Dresden	38	19	5	14	58	40	+18	62	Qualification for DFB-Pokal
5	1. FC Saarbrücken	38	15	15	8	60	43	+17	60	

Source: DFB
Rules for classification: 1) Points; 2) Goal difference; 3) Goals scored; 4) Head-to-head results; 5) Head-to-head away goals scored; 6) Away goals scored; 7) Play-off.
(C) Champions; (O) Play-off winners; (P) Promoted

==== Results summary ====
Overall								Home						Away					
Pld	W	D	L	GF	GA	GD	Pts	W	D	L	GF	GA	GD	W	D	L	GF	GA	GD
35	17	11	7	49	37	+12	62	8	8	2	25	16	+9	9	3	5	24	21	+3

Last updated: 27 April 2024.
Source: Soccerway

==== Results by round ====
Round	1	2	3	4	5	6	7	8	9	10	11	12	13	14	15	16	17	18
Ground	H	A	H	A	H	A	H	A	H	A	H	A	H	A	H	A	H	H
Result	D	W	D	D	W	D	L	W	W	W	W	W	W	W	W	W	W	D
Position	11	4	7	8	4	5	8	6	3	3	2	2	1	2	2	1	1	1

Updated to match(es) played on 27 April 2024. Source: Soccerway
A = Away; H = Home; W = Win; D = Draw; L = Loss

==== Matches ====
The league fixtures were unveiled on 7 July 2023.

5 August 2023 1	Jahn Regensburg	1–1	SpVgg Unterhaching	Regensburg
14:00 CEST (UTC+2)	Viet 20'	Report	Westermeier (yellow card) 1'; Keller 24'; Schwabl (yellow card) 45'; Waidner (yellow card) 55'; Maier (yellow card) 59'; Welzmüller (yellow card) 59'; Bauer (yellow card) 90+3'	Stadium: Jahnstadion Regensburg; Attendance: 11,081; Referee: Florian Exner

20 August 2023 2	SC Verl	1–2	Jahn Regensburg	Verl
16:30 CEST (UTC+2)	Mikic (yellow card) 8'; Corboz (yellow card) 44'; Lokotsch 62'; Knost (yellow card) 90+2'	Report	Saller 11'; Bulić (yellow card) 18'; Faber 86'	Stadium: Sportclub Arena; Attendance: 2,715; Referee: Riem Hussein

23 August 2023 3	Jahn Regensburg	0–0	Borussia Dortmund II	Regensburg
19:00 CEST (UTC+2)	Saller (yellow card) 48'	Report	Göbel (yellow card) 32'; Eberwein (yellow card) 57'; Pfanne (yellow card) 90+2'	Stadium: Jahnstadion Regensburg; Attendance: 8,418; Referee: Luca Jürgensen

27 August 2023 4	Arminia Bielefeld	1–1	Jahn Regensburg	Bielefeld
13:30 CEST (UTC+2)	Schreck (yellow card) 18'; Gohlke 20', (yellow card) 90+4'	Report	Ballas 12'; Bulić (yellow card) 44'; Viet (yellow card) 70'; Breunig (yellow card) 90+2'	Stadium: SchücoArena; Attendance: 20,000; Referee: Lars Erbst

3 September 2023 5	Jahn Regensburg	2–1	MSV Duisburg	Regensburg
16:30 CEST (UTC+2)	Schönfelder (yellow card) 23'; Kother 30'; Ganaus 76'; Geipl (yellow card) 80'; Saller (yellow card) 82'	Report	Stierlin 33'; Castañeda (yellow card) 43'; Müller (yellow card) 87'; Bitter (yellow card) 90+5'	Stadium: Jahnstadion Regensburg; Attendance: 8,630; Referee: Nico Fuchs

16 September 2023 6	Rot-Weiss Essen	0–0	Jahn Regensburg	Essen
14:00 CET (UTC+1)		Report	Schönfelder (yellow card) 17'; Gebhardt (yellow card) 44'; Geipl (yellow card) 74'	Stadium: Stadion an der Hafenstraße; Attendance: 17,000; Referee: Martin Speckner

23 September 2023 7	Jahn Regensburg	1–2	SV Sandhausen	Regensburg
14:00 CET (UTC+1)	Saller (yellow card) 2'; Geipl (yellow card) 41'; Viet 90+3'	Report	Knipping (yellow card) 8'; Otto 19'; Weik (yellow card) 31'; Diekmeier (yellow card) 43'; Hennings 89'; Rehnen (yellow card) 90+1'	Stadium: Jahnstadion Regensburg; Attendance: 7,052; Referee: Patrick Alt

1 October 2023 8	Erzgebirge Aue	0–1	Jahn Regensburg	Aue
19:30 CET (UTC+1)	Taschtschi (yellow card) 41'; Seitz (yellow card) 48'; Vukancic (yellow card) 84'	Report	Ziegele 75'; Kother (yellow card) 88'	Stadium: Erzgebirgsstadion; Attendance: 7,533; Referee: Robert Kampka

4 October 2023 9	Jahn Regensburg	2–0	Waldhof Mannheim	Regensburg
19:00 CET (UTC+1)	Sechelmann 41' (o.g.); Geipl (yellow card) 76'; Faber 83'	Report	Wagner (yellow card) 10'; Bahn (yellow card) 38'; Rieckmann (yellow card) 79'	Stadium: Jahnstadion Regensburg; Attendance: 6,812; Referee: Konrad Oldhafer

8 October 2023 10	FC Ingolstadt	2–4	Jahn Regensburg	Ingolstadt
19:30 CET (UTC+1)	Schröck (yellow card) 14'; Deichmann 21'; Seiffert (yellow card) 49'; Mause 51'; Cvjetinović (yellow card) 88'	Report	Ganaus 40'; Huth 70', 78' (pen.); Viet (yellow card) 87'; Hein (yellow card) 90+1'; Geipl 90+4'	Stadium: Audi Sportpark; Attendance: 6,294; Referee: Cristian Ballweg

14 October 2023 11	Jahn Regensburg	2–1	VfB Lübeck	Regensburg
14:00 CET (UTC+1)	Saller (yellow card) 26'; Breunig (yellow card) 29' (yellow-red card) 70'; Kother 41'; Schönfelder 45+3', (yellow card) 76'; Viet (yellow card) 51'; Hottmann (yellow card) 82'; Geipl (yellow card) 85'; Diawusie (yellow card) 90+6'; Faber (yellow card) 90+6'	Report	Rüdiger (yellow card) 6'; Velasco 46'; Reddemann (yellow card) 54'; Sommer (red card) 79'; Löhden (yellow card) 87'; Farrona-Pulido (yellow card) 90+1'	Stadium: Jahnstadion Regensburg; Attendance: 8,091; Referee: Leonidas Exuzidis

21 October 2023 12	Hallescher FC	1–2	Jahn Regensburg	Halle
14:00 CET (UTC+1)	Deniz (yellow card) 37'; Vollert (yellow card) 52'; Baumann 55'	Report	Ballas (yellow card) 39'; Gebhardt (yellow card) 45+2'; Viet 69'; Kother (yellow card) 72'; Huth 79'; Bulić (yellow card) 82'; Saller (yellow card) 89'	Stadium: Leuna Chemie Stadion; Attendance: 4,000; Referee: Timo Gansloweit

28 October 2023 13	Jahn Regensburg	2–1	Preußen Münster	Regensburg
16:30 CET (UTC+1)	Kother 57', 90+2'; Schönfelder (yellow card) 70'	Report	Koulis (yellow card) 28'; Kok (red card) 71'; Scherder 90+6'	Stadium: Jahnstadion Regensburg; Attendance: 8,129; Referee: Daniel Bartnitzki

4 November 2023 14	1860 Munich	0–1	Jahn Regensburg	Munich
14:00 CET (UTC+1)	Greilinger (yellow card) 21'; Vrenezi (yellow card) 51'; Zejnullahu (yellow card) 51'	Report	Geipl (yellow card) 69'; Eisenhuth 90+2'	Stadium: Grünwalder Stadion; Attendance: 15,000; Referee: Nicolas Winter

12 November 2023 15	Jahn Regensburg	2–0	SSV Ulm	Regensburg
19:30 CET (UTC+1)	Saller 16', (yellow card) 50'; Faber (yellow card) 34'; Bulić (yellow card) 81'; Hottmann 88'	Report	Maier (yellow card) 38'; Geyer (yellow card) 77'; Yarbrough (yellow card) 80'	Stadium: Jahnstadion Regensburg; Attendance: 8,820; Referee: Wolfgang Haslberger

26 November 2023 16	Dynamo Dresden	0–1	Jahn Regensburg	Dresden
16:30 CET (UTC+1)		Report	Bulić (yellow card) 11'; Ziegele (yellow card) 67'; Geipl (yellow card) 79'; Huth (yellow card) 85'; Ballas 90+3'	Stadium: Rudolf-Harbig-Stadion; Attendance: 29,578; Referee: Patrick Alt

3 December 2023 17	Jahn Regensburg	3–2	SC Freiburg II	Regensburg
16:30 CET (UTC+1)	Huth 34' (pen.); Kother 36', (yellow card) 44'; Ganaus 77'	Report	Yilmaz 40'; Baur (yellow card) 45+3'; Lienhard 58'	Stadium: Jahnstadion Regensburg; Attendance: 7,524; Referee: Marc Philip Eckermann

10 December 2023 18	Jahn Regensburg	1–1	Viktoria Köln	Regensburg
13:30 CET (UTC+1)	Ganaus 27', (yellow card) 29'; Eisenhuth (yellow card) 70'	Report	Sticker 90+8'; May (yellow card) 90+11'	Stadium: Jahnstadion Regensburg; Attendance: 7,104; Referee: Jarno Wienefeld

=== DFB-Pokal ===
14 August 2023 First round	Jahn Regensburg	1–2	1. FC Magdeburg	Regensburg
18:00 CEST (UTC+2)	Geipl (yellow card) 45+4'; Faber (yellow card) 53'; Kother 63'; Huth (yellow card) 76'; Weidinger (yellow card) 90+3'; Hottmann (yellow card) 90+3'	Report	Hoti (yellow card) 9'; Schuler 16', (yellow card) 83'; Atik (yellow card) 45+4'; Hugonet (yellow card) 55', (goal) 59'; Heber (yellow card) 66'	Stadium: Jahnstadion Regensburg; Attendance: 6,500; Referee: Patrick Alt
