= 2026–27 Fortuna Düsseldorf season =

Fortuna Düsseldorf
2026-27 season
- Chairman: Alexander Jobst
- Manager: Alexander Ende (until 18 October); Jens Langeneke (Interim) (from 18 October)
- Stadium: Merkur Spiel-Arena
- 3. Liga: 13th
- DFB-Pokal: Elim. 1st Round
- Niederrheinpokal: TBD
Home colours	Away colours	Third colours

The 2026-27 season is the 132nd season in the history of Fortuna Düsseldorf, and its first season in 3. Liga after relegation from 2. Bundesliga at the end of the 2025-26 season. In addition to the domestic league, the team will participate in the DFB-Pokal and the Niederrheinpokal.

Manager Alexander Ende began his first full campaign after being hired to replace Markus Anfang in April 2026, near the end of the 2025-26 2. Bundesliga season. On 18 October, Ende was dismissed and replaced with Jens Langeneke on an interim basis.

Samir Arabi also replaces Sven Mislintat as Sporting Director.

== Transfers ==
=== In ===
Pos.	Player	Transferred from	Fee	Date	Source
MF	(Germany) Jomaine Consbruch	(Germany) Greuther Fürth	Free	10 June 2026	
MF	(Netherlands) Jorrit Hendrix	(Germany) Preußen Münster	Free	11 June 2026	
ST	(Germany) Fabian Schleusener	(Germany) Karlsruher SC	Free	17 June 2026	
LB	(Germany) Sascha Risch	(Germany) Dynamo Dresden	Free	18 June 2026	
CB	(Germany) Dominique Heintz	(Germany) 1. FC Köln	Free	19 June 2026	
CB	(Germany) Matthias Zimmermann	N/A	Contract Extension	19 June 2026	
RB	(Netherlands) Steven van der Sloot	(Netherlands) ADO Den Haag	Undisclosed	25 June 2026	
CB	(Germany) Mechak Quiala Tito	(Germany) Fortuna Düsseldorf II	Professional Contract	25 June 2026	
DF	(Luxembourg) Miguel Goncalves	(Germany) FC Homburg	€25,000	25 June 2026	
GK	(Germany) Louis Lord	(Germany) Erzgebirge Aue	Free	27 June 2026	
ST	(Germany) Eric Hottmann	(Germany) Jahn Regensburg	€300,000	29 June 2026	
GK	(Germany) Lasse Reiß	(Germany) Mainz 05	Loan	6 July 2026	
MF	(Germany) Yassine Bouchama	(Germany) Preußen Münster	Free	6 July 2026	
ST	(Germany) Lukas Eixler	(Germany) FSV Zwickau	Free	9 July 2026	
DF	(Germany) Felix Meiser	(Germany) FC Augsburg	Undisclosed (w/Buyback Option)	10 July 2026	
MF	(Germany) Marcel Benger	(Germany) Preußen Münster	Free	23 July 2026	
MF	(Germany) Philipp Förster	(Germany) Karlsruher SC	Free	28 July 2026	
MF	(Germany) Andreas Müller	(Germany) Karlsruher SC	Loan	11 August 2026	
LB	(Germany) Erik Wekesser	(Germany) 1. FC Kaiserslautern	Undisclosed	24 August 2026	
CB	(Germany) Lukas Bornschein	(Germany) VfL Osnabrück	Loan	31 August 2026	
MF	(Germany) Filimon Gerezgiher	(Germany) SV Elversberg	Undisclosed	1 September 2026	

=== Out ===
Pos.	Player	Transferred to	Fee	Date	Source
DF	(Netherlands) Jordy de Wijs	(Netherlands) RKC Waalwijk	Free	19 May 2026	
MF	(Japan) Satoshi Tanaka	(Germany) Schalke 04	€1,000,000	10 June 2026	
GK	(Germany) Marcel Lotka	(Germany) Energie Cottbus	Free	15 June 2026	
MF	(Germany) Shinta Appelkamp	(Germany) Greuther Fürth	Free	16 June 2026	
GK	(Germany) Ben Zich	(Germany) Fortuna Köln	Undisclosed	18 June 2026	
MF	(Germany) Karim Affo	(Germany) Borussia Mönchengladbach II	Undisclosed	19 June 2026	
ST	(Germany) Luca Raimund	(Germany) VfL Osnabrück	Undisclosed	19 June 2026	
CF	(Switzerland) Cédric Itten	(Germany) Werder Bremen	Free	20 June 2026	
DF	(Germany) King Manu	(Germany) Energie Cottbus	Free	22 June 2026	
ST	(Germany) Julian Hettwer	Austria Wien	Free	24 June 2026	
DF	(Germany) Kenneth Schmidt	(Germany) Dynamo Dresden	€800,000	25 June 2026	
DF	(Germany) Emmanuel Iyoha	N/A	Expired contract	4 July 2026	
FW	(Denmark) Christian Rasmussen	(Germany) VfL Bochum	Free	8 July 2026	
MF	(Germany) Sima Suso	(Germany) FC Augsburg	€1,600,000	10 July 2026	
MF	(Germany) Anouar El Azzouzi	(Italy) Frosinone Calcio	Free	10 July 2026	
DF	(Germany) Emmanuel Iyoha	(Germany) Magdeburg	Free	16 July 2026	
DF	(Germany) Tim Rossmann	(Germany) Sonnenhof Großaspach	Free	20 July 2026	
MF	(France) Giovanni Haag	(Singapore) Lion City Sailors	Free	4 August 2026	
CB	(Germany) Mechak Quiala Tito	(Germany) Rot-Weiß Erfurt	Loan	12 August 2026	
GK	(Germany) Florian Kastenmeier	(Netherlands) Feyenoord	Free	1 September 2026	
DF	(Germany) Moritz Heyer	(Germany) SV Meppen	Free	27 October 2026	

== Friendlies ==
=== Pre-season ===
Source: Soccerway

3 July 2026 Friendly	FC Monheim	0-6	Fortuna Düsseldorf	Monheim
19:00 CEST (UTC+2)		Report	Schleusener 7'; Sauck 40'; Paulina 49' (pen.); Anhari 77'; Hottmann 79'; Egouli 82'	Stadium: Merkur Spielbanken Rheinstadion

8 July 2026 Friendly	SC St. Tönis	0-5	Fortuna Düsseldorf	Tönisvorst
19:30 CEST (UTC+2)		Report	Egouli 16'; Schleusener 39'; Quiala Tito 51'; Hottmann 66'; Arden 86'	Stadium: YAYLA-Sportpark

9 July 2026 Friendly	VfL Benrath	1-12	Fortuna Düsseldorf	Düsseldorf
19:00 CEST (UTC+2)	Kassar 13'		Risch 5'; van der Sloot 8'; Consbruch 22'; Paulina 25'; Hottmann 26'; Heintz 31'; Egouli 41'; Quiala Tito 52'; Schleusener 57', 81', 86'; Anas Slimani 90'	Stadium: Stadion Benrath

14 July 2026 Friendly	MFK Ružomberok	0-2	Fortuna Düsseldorf	Freistadt
18:00 CEST (UTC+2)			Gonçalves (yellow card) 71'; Hottmann 4'; Slimani 90+2'	Stadium: Holzhaider-Stadion

18 July 2026 Friendly	Linzer ASK	2-0	Fortuna Düsseldorf	Linz
18:30 CEST (UTC+2)	Jørgensen 54'; Harakaté 79'			Stadium: Raiffeisen Arena

25 July 2026 Friendly	Fortuna Düsseldorf	2-1	Borussia Dortmund	Düsseldorf
13:00 CEST (UTC+2)	Schleusener 49'; Anas Slimani 79'	Report	Albert 20'; Riedl (yellow card) 45+1'	Stadium: Merkur Spiel-Arena; Referee: Jonah Besong

31 July 2026 Friendly	Hannover 96	3-2	Fortuna Düsseldorf	Hanover
17:00 CEST (UTC+2)	Pichler 18'; Roggow 40'; Hobrecht 53'	Report	Slimani (yellow card) 47'; Schleusener 66' (pen.); Gonçalves 90'

== Competitions ==
=== Overall record ===
Competition	First match	Last match	Starting round	Final position	Record							
Competition	First match	Last match	Starting round	Final position	Pld	W	D	L	GF	GA	GD	Win %
3. Liga	7 August 2026	22 May 2027	Matchday 1	TBD	13	4	4	5	14	17	−3	30.77
DFB-Pokal	23 August 2026	23 August 2026	First round	First round	1	0	0	1	1	5	−4	0.00
Niederrheinpokal	9 September 2026	TBD	First round	TBD	4	4	0	0	30	0	+30	100.00
Total					18	8	4	6	45	22	+23	44.44

Last updated: 18 November 2026
Source: Soccerway

=== 3. Liga ===
==== League table ====
Pos	Team	Pld	W	D	L	GF	GA	GD	Pts
10	Waldhof Mannheim	14	6	1	7	23	23	0	19
11	Hansa Rostock	13	5	4	4	22	22	0	19
12	Fortuna Düsseldorf	14	5	4	5	17	18	−1	19
13	SV Meppen	14	5	3	6	19	20	−1	18
14	Jahn Regensburg	14	4	4	6	25	24	+1	16

Updated to match(es) played on 22 November 2026. Source: DFB
Rules for classification: 1) Points; 2) Goal difference; 3) Goals scored; 4) Head-to-head results; 5) Head-to-head away goals scored; 6) Away goals scored; 7) Play-off.

==== Results by round ====
Round	1	2	3	4	5	6	7	8	9	10	11	12	13	14	15	16	17	18	19	20	21	22	23	24	25	26	27	28	29	30	31	32	33	34	35	36	37	38
Ground	A	H	H	A	H	A	A	H	A	H	A	H	A	H	A	H	A	H	A	H	A	A	H	A	H	H	A	H	A	H	A	H	A	H	A	H	A	H
Result	L	L	W	D	W	W	L	D	W	L	D	D	L	-	-	-	-	-	-	-	-	-	-	-	-	-	-	-	-	-	-	-	-	-	-	-	-	-
Position	14	18	17	16	11	8	10	10	6	9	12	10	13	-	-	-	-	-	-	-	-	-	-	-	-	-	-	-	-	-	-	-	-	-	-	-	-	

Source: Kicker
A = Away; H = Home; W = Win; D = Draw; L = Loss

==== Results summary ====
Overall								Home						Away					
Pld	W	D	L	GF	GA	GD	Pts	W	D	L	GF	GA	GD	W	D	L	GF	GA	GD
13	4	4	5	14	17	−3	16	2	2	2	6	8	−2	2	2	3	8	9	−1

Last updated: 7 November 2026.

==== Matches ====
The match schedule was released on 8 July 2026.

7 August 2026 1	Waldhof Mannheim	2–1	Fortuna Düsseldorf	Mannheim
19:00 CEST (UTC+2)	Thill 18'; Ulbricht 48'; Okeke (yellow card) 66'; N'Tumba (yellow card) 82'; Boyd (yellow card) 90+3'	Report	Schleusener 56'; Heintz (yellow card) 42'; Amaniampong (yellow card) 53'; Bouchama (yellow card) 63'; Paulina (yellow card) 79'; Meiser (yellow card) 90+5'	Stadium: Carl-Benz-Stadion; Attendance: 19,007; Referee: Fabienne Michel

15 August 2026 2	Fortuna Düsseldorf	0–2	TSG Hoffenheim II	Düsseldorf
14:00 CEST (UTC+2)	Zimmermann (yellow card) 33'; Hendrix (red card) 79'	Report	Poller 3'; Dedić 52'; Theuer (yellow card) 49'; Fields (yellow card) 88'; Makanda (yellow card) 90+4'	Stadium: Merkur Spiel-Arena; Attendance: 27,419; Referee: Martin Wilke

28 August 2026 3	Fortuna Düsseldorf	1–0	VfB Stuttgart II	Düsseldorf
19:00 CEST (UTC+2)	Oberdorf (yellow card) 25'; Müller (yellow card) 52', (goal) 59'; Risch (yellow card) 61'	Report	Penna (yellow card) 18'; Stange (yellow card) 48'; Sessa (yellow card) 57'; Preu (yellow card) 78'	Stadium: Merkur Spiel-Arena; Attendance: 25,805; Referee: Tom Bauer

6 September 2026 4	Fortuna Köln	0–0	Fortuna Düsseldorf	Köln
19:30 CEST (UTC+2)	Fischer (yellow card) 24'	Report	Benger (yellow card) 46'	Stadium: Südstadion; Attendance: 9,544; Referee: Cengiz Kabalakli

12 September 2026 5	Fortuna Düsseldorf	2–1	MSV Duisburg	Düsseldorf
14:00 CEST (UTC+2)	Schleusener (yellow card) 65', (goal) 68'; Hottmann 86'; Müller (yellow card) 90+3'; Wekesser (yellow card) 45'	Report	Remmert 46'	Stadium: Merkur Spiel-Arena; Attendance: 49,325; Referee: Patrick Schwengers

15 September 2026 6	Jahn Regensburg	1–2	Fortuna Düsseldorf	Regensburg
19:00 CEST (UTC+2)	Boujellab 18', (yellow card) 24'; Karbstein (yellow card) 28'; Wurm (yellow card) 62'	Report	Wekesser 22'; Eixler 79'; Egouli (yellow card) 20'; Bouchama (yellow card) 84'	Stadium: Jahnstadion Regensburg; Attendance: 8,027; Referee: Timo Gansloweit

19 September 2026 7	Alemannia Aachen	1-0	Fortuna Düsseldorf	Aachen
14:00 CEST (UTC+2)	Scepanik 10', (yellow card) 81'; Bagkalianis (yellow card) 38'; Bitumazala (yellow card) 90+3'	Report	Egouli (yellow card) 17' (yellow card) 62' (yellow-red card); Wekesser (yellow card) 35'	Stadium: Tivoli; Attendance: 30,083; Referee: Konrad Oldhafer

11 October 2026 8	Fortuna Düsseldorf	2-2	SC Verl	Düsseldorf
19:30 CEST (UTC+2)	Oberdorf 38'; Hendrix 46'; Müller (yellow card) 24'	Report	Heike 45'; Berner 55'; Seidel (yellow card) 37'; Wekesser (yellow card) 59'; Arden (yellow card) 78'; Benger (yellow card) 85'	Stadium: Merkur Spiel-Arena; Attendance: 24,769; Referee: Sebastian Hilsberg

14 October 2026 9	Preußen Münster	1-2	Fortuna Düsseldorf	Münster
19:00 CEST (UTC+2)	Preißinger (yellow card) 22'; Rösch (yellow card) 67'; Tikvić (yellow card) 85'; Lucas Zeller (yellow card) 90+5'; Higl 53'	Report	Arden (yellow card) 28'; Slimani (yellow card) 67'; Bouchama (yellow card) 87'; Wekesser (yellow card) 90+4'; Müller 65'; Hottmann 90+2'	Stadium: Preußenstadion; Attendance: 13,945; Referee: Felix Prigan

17 October 2026 10	Fortuna Düsseldorf	1-3	1. FC Saarbrücken	Düsseldorf
14:00 CEST (UTC+2)	Paulina 10'; Bornschein (yellow card) 89'	Report	Cvjetinović (yellow card) 44'; Brünker 13'; Owusu 50'; Staff 90' (yellow card) 90'	Stadium: Merkur Spiel-Arena; Attendance: 34,049; Referee: Leonidas Exuzidis

24 October 2026 11	Hansa Rostock	1-1	Fortuna Düsseldorf	Rostock
14:00 CEST (UTC+2)	Wallner (yellow card) 71'; Voglsammer 44'	Report	Bornschein (yellow card) 63'; Slimani 45+1'	Stadium: Ostseestadion; Attendance: 25,762; Referee: Lars Erbst

30 October 2026 12	Fortuna Düsseldorf	0-0	SV Meppen	Düsseldorf
19:00 CET (UTC+1)	Müller (yellow card) 90+1' (yellow card) 90+1' (yellow-red card); Anhari (yellow card) 90+4'	Report	Domröse (yellow card) 78'; Touglo (yellow card) 88'; Zehir (yellow card) 90+5'	Stadium: Merkur Spiel-Arena; Attendance: 32,027; Referee: Yannick Sager

7 November 2026 13	FC Ingolstadt	3-2	Fortuna Düsseldorf	Ingolstadt
14:00 CET (UTC+1)	Lorenz 38'; Ugondu 63'; Carlsen 84'; Rosenlöcher (yellow card) 45+4'	Report	Gerezgiher 9'; Hottmann 18' (yellow card) 52'; Hendrix (yellow card) 56'; Wekesser (yellow card) 73'	Stadium: Audi Sportpark; Attendance: 5,900; Referee: Felix Grund

21 November 2026 14	Fortuna Düsseldorf	3-1	SG Sonnenhof Grossaspach	Düsseldorf
14:00 CET (UTC+1)	Anhari 9'; Gerezgiher 16'; Hendrix 23'; Bouchama (yellow card) 56'; van der Sloot (yellow card) 64'	Report	Öztunali 53'; Maier (yellow card) 73'	Stadium: Merkur Spiel-Arena; Attendance: 26,142; Referee: Niclas Rose

28 November 2026 15	Würzburger Kickers	v	Fortuna Düsseldorf	Würzburg
14:00 CET (UTC+1)				Stadium: Akon Arena

5 December 2026 16	Fortuna Düsseldorf	v	SV Wehen Wiesbaden	Düsseldorf
16:30 CET (UTC+1)				Stadium: Merkur Spiel-Arena

11 December 2026 17	Viktoria Köln	v	Fortuna Düsseldorf	Cologne
19:00 CET (UTC+1)				Stadium: Sportpark Höhenberg

20 December 2026 18	Fortuna Düsseldorf	v	Rot-Weiss Essen	Düsseldorf
19:30 CET (UTC+1)				Stadium: Merkur Spiel-Arena

17 January 2027 19	TSV Havelse	v	Fortuna Düsseldorf	Hanover
16:30 CET (UTC+1)				Stadium: Eilenriedestadion

23 January 2027 20	Fortuna Düsseldorf	v	Waldhof Mannheim	Düsseldorf
14:00 CET (UTC+1)				Stadium: Merkur Spiel-Arena

29 January 2027 21	TSG Hoffenheim II	v	Fortuna Düsseldorf	Sinsheim
TBD CET (UTC+1)				Stadium: SNP Arena

5 February 2027 22	VfB Stuttgart II	v	Fortuna Düsseldorf	Stuttgart
TBD CET (UTC+1)				Stadium: Gazi-Stadion auf der Waldau

12 February 2027 23	Fortuna Düsseldorf	v	Fortuna Köln	Düsseldorf
TBD CET (UTC+1)				Stadium: Merkur Spiel-Arena

19 February 2027 24	MSV Duisburg	v	Fortuna Düsseldorf	Duisburg
TBD CET (UTC+1)				Stadium: Schauinsland-Reisen-Arena

26 February 2027 25	Fortuna Düsseldorf	v	Jahn Regensburg	Düsseldorf
TBD CET (UTC+1)				Stadium: Merkur Spiel-Arena

2 March 2027 26	Fortuna Düsseldorf	v	Alemannia Aachen	Düsseldorf
TBD CET (UTC+1)				Stadium: Merkur Spiel-Arena

5 March 2027 27	SC Verl	v	Fortuna Düsseldorf	Verl
TBD CET (UTC+1)				Stadium: Sportclub Arena

12 March 2027 28	Fortuna Düsseldorf	v	Preußen Münster	Düsseldorf
TBD CET (UTC+1)				Stadium: Merkur Spiel-Arena

16 March 2027 29	1. FC Saarbrücken	v	Fortuna Düsseldorf	Saarbrücken
TBD CET (UTC+1)				Stadium: Ludwigsparkstadion

19 March 2027 30	Fortuna Düsseldorf	v	Hansa Rostock	Düsseldorf
TBD CET (UTC+1)				Stadium: Merkur Spiel-Arena

2 April 2027 31	SV Meppen	v	Fortuna Düsseldorf	Meppen
TBD CEST (UTC+2)				Stadium: Hänsch-Arena

9 April 2027 32	Fortuna Düsseldorf	v	FC Ingolstadt	Düsseldorf
TBD CEST (UTC+2)				Stadium: Merkur Spiel-Arena

16 April 2027 33	SG Sonnenhof Grossaspach	v	Fortuna Düsseldorf	Aspach
TBD CEST (UTC+2)				Stadium: WIRmachenDRUCK Arena

23 April 2027 34	Fortuna Düsseldorf	v	Würzburger Kickers	Düsseldorf
TBD CEST (UTC+2)				Stadium: Merkur Spiel-Arena

27 April 2027 35	SV Wehen Wiesbaden	v	Fortuna Düsseldorf	Wiesbaden
TBD CEST (UTC+2)				Stadium: BRITA-Arena

7 May 2027 36	Fortuna Düsseldorf	v	Viktoria Köln	Düsseldorf
TBD CEST (UTC+2)				Stadium: Merkur Spiel-Arena

14 May 2027 37	Rot-Weiss Essen	v	Fortuna Düsseldorf	Essen
TBD CEST (UTC+2)				Stadium: Stadion an der Hafenstraße

22 May 2027 38	Fortuna Düsseldorf	v	TSV Havelse	Düsseldorf
TBD CEST (UTC+2)				Stadium: Merkur Spiel-Arena

=== DFB-Pokal ===
23 August 2026 First round	Fortuna Düsseldorf	1–5	SC Freiburg	Düsseldorf
18:00 CET (UTC+1)	Scleusener 76'; Zimmermann (yellow card) 71'	Report	Höler 18'; Matanović 71', 90+4'; Kübler 74'; Makengo 80'; Yuito Suzuki (yellow card) 23'	Stadium: Merkur Spiel-Arena; Attendance: 27,616; Referee: Robert Hartmann

=== Niederrheinpokal ===
9 September 2026 First round	SV Biemenhorst	0-5	Fortuna Düsseldorf	Bocholt
19:30 CET (UTC+1)		Report	Bornschein 19'; Arden 42'; Consbruch 55', 71'; Wekesser 57'; Hendrix (yellow card) 7'; Gerezgiher (yellow card) 50'	Stadium: praemium Park am Hünting; Attendance: 4,141; Referee: Lars Aarts

23 September 2026 Second round	SW Alstaden	0-12	Fortuna Düsseldorf	Düsseldorf
19:30 CET (UTC+1)	Zekjiri (yellow card) 83'	Report	Consbruch 2'; Eixler 5', 21'; Hottmann 12', 50', 81', 86'; Müller 62'; Zimmermann 67'; Schleusener 75', 87', 90'	Stadium: Paul-Janes-Stadion; Attendance: 6,000; Referee: Marco Lechtenberg

6 October 2026 Third round	Fortuna Düsseldorf	10-0	DSC 99	Düsseldorf
19:30 CET (UTC+1)	Hottmann 19', 30', 74'; Oberdorf 26'; Förster 28'; Arden 44'; Bouchama 48', 85'; Schleusener 57'; Anhari 80'	Report		Stadium: Paul-Janes-Stadion; Attendance: 6,300; Referee: Davide Zeisberg

18 November 2026 Quarterfinals	Fortuna Düsseldorf	3-0	MSV Duisburg	Düsseldorf
20:00 CET (UTC+1)	Hottmann 60'; Gerezgiher 81'; Anhari 88'; Müller (yellow card) 28'; Bornschein (yellow card) 30'	Report	Noß (yellow card) 36'; Krüger (yellow card) 52'; Bulic (red card) 72'	Stadium: Merkur Spiel-Arena; Attendance: 31,092; Referee: Kristijan Rajkovski
