= 2021–22 Borussia Dortmund II season =

Borussia Dortmund II
2021–22 season
- Manager: Enrico Maaßen
- Stadium: Stadion Rote Erde
- 3. Liga: 9th
- Top goalscorer: Berkan Taz (8 goals)
- Highest home attendance: 3,128 (27 November 2021 vs. FC Kaiserslautern)
- Lowest home attendance: 529 (18 December 2021 vs. FSV Zwickau)
Home colours	Away colours

The 2021–22 Borussia Dortmund II season was the club's first season return in the 3. Liga since their relegation in the 2014–15 season.

== Competitions ==
=== Pre-season ===
11 July 2021 Exhibition	Pafos FC	0–1	Borussia Dortmund II	Austria
		Report		Stadium: Schwaz Hammers Stadium

=== 3. Liga ===
==== League table ====
Pos	Team	Pld	W	D	L	GF	GA	GD	Pts
7	1. FC Saarbrücken	36	14	11	11	50	44	+6	53
8	Wehen Wiesbaden	36	14	9	13	49	44	+5	51
9	Borussia Dortmund II (Note: Reserve teams are ineligible for promotion or DFB-Pokal qualification.)	36	14	7	15	51	48	+3	49
10	FSV Zwickau	36	11	14	11	46	44	+2	47
11	SC Freiburg II	36	12	11	13	34	42	−8	47

Source: DFB
Rules for classification: 1) Points; 2) Goal difference; 3) Goals scored; 4) Head-to-head results; 5) Head-to-head away goals scored; 6) Away goals scored; 7) Play-off.

==== Matches ====
24 July 2021	FSV Zwickau	1–2	Borussia Dortmund II	Zwickau
14:00 CEST (UTC+2)	König 4'	Report	Pherai 12'; Raschl 58'	Stadium: Stadion Zwickau; Attendance: 4,539

31 July 2021	Borussia Dortmund II	1–1	SV Waldhof Mannheim	Dortmund
14:00 CEST (UTC+2)	Pasalic 16'		Boyamba 61'	Stadium: Stadion Rote Erde; Attendance: 1,211

13 August 2021	SC Freiburg II	2–5	Borussia Dortmund II	Freiburg
19:00 CEST (UTC+2)	Schade 13', 34'		Pasalic 14', 59'; Bornemann 16'; Tachie 22'; Makreckis 90+5'	Stadium: Dreisamstadion; Attendance: 5,300

21 August 2021	Borussia Dortmund II	0–0	FC Saarbrücken	Dortmund
14:00 CEST (UTC+2)				Stadium: Stadion Rote Erde; Attendance: 1,079

25 August 2021	VfL Osnabrück	2–1	Borussia Dortmund II	Osnabrück
19:00 CEST (UTC+2)	Heider 14'; Kunze 74'		Taz 53'	Stadium: Stadion an der Bremer Brücke; Attendance: 7,156

29 August 2021	Borussia Dortmund II	4–1	MSV Duisburg	Dortmund
13:00 CEST (UTC+2)				Stadium: Stadion Rote Erde; Attendance: 1,432

5 September 2021	TSV Havelse	0–1	Borussia Dortmund II	Hanover
14:00 CEST (UTC+2)				Stadium: HDI Arena; Attendance: 1,002

11 September 2021	Borussia Dortmund II	0–2	FC Magdeburg	Dortmund
14:00 CEST (UTC+2)				Stadium: Stadion Rote Erde; Attendance: 1,260

20 September 2021	Wehen Wiesbaden	0–1	Borussia Dortmund II	Wiesbaden
19:00 CEST (UTC+2)				Stadium: Brita-Arena; Attendance: 2,547

26 September 2021	Türkgücü München	2-1	Borussia Dortmund II	Munich
13:00 CEST (UTC+2)				Stadium: Munich Olympiastadion; Attendance: 2,209

3 October 2021	Borussia Dortmund II	2–0	Würzburger Kickers	Dortmund
				Stadium: Stadion Rote Erde; Attendance: 976

16 October 2021	Eintracht Braunschweig	4–2	Borussia Dortmund II	Braunschweig
				Stadium: Eintracht-Stadion; Attendance: 9,000

October 2021	Borussia Dortmund II	0–1	FC Viktoria Köln	Dortmund
				Stadium: Stadion Rote Erde; Attendance: 978

30 October 2021	Viktoria Berlin	2–1	Borussia Dortmund II	Berlin
				Stadium: Friedrich-Ludwig-Jahn-Sportpark; Attendance: 2,458

6 November 2021	Borussia Dortmund II	0–1	SV Meppen	Dortmund
				Stadium: Stadion Rote Erde; Attendance: 2,960

20 November 2021	Hallescher FC	1–2	Borussia Dortmund II	Halle
				Stadium: Erdgas Sportpark; Attendance: 6,247

27 November 2021	Borussia Dortmund II	0–0	FC Kaiserslautern	Dortmund
				Stadium: Stadion Rote Erde; Attendance: 3,128

4 December 2021	SC Verl	0–3	Borussia Dortmund II	Lotte
				Stadium: Stadion am Lotter Kreuz; Attendance: 303

11 December 2021	Borussia Dortmund II	0–2	TSV 1860 Munich	Dortmund
				Stadium: Stadion Rote Erde; Attendance: 900

18 December 2021	Borussia Dortmund II	3–1	FSV Zwickau	Dortmund
				Stadium: Stadion Rote Erde; Attendance: 529

January 2022	SV Waldhof Mannheim	1–3	Borussia Dortmund II	Mannheim
				Stadium: Carl-Benz-Stadion; Attendance: 500

21 January 2022 22	Borussia Dortmund II	1 - 1	Freiburg II	Dortmund
19:00 CET	Tigges 5'; Maloney (red card) 90+2'	Report	Leopold 54' (pen.); Kammerknecht (yellow card) 56'; Engelhardt (yellow card) 60'; Wagner (yellow card) 63'	Stadium: Stadion Rote Erde; Attendance: 635; Referee: (Germany) Patrick Alt

26 January 2022 23	Saarbrücken	2 - 0	Borussia Dortmund II	Saarbrücken
19:00 CET	Ernst (yellow card) 33'; Grimaldi 51'; Gouras 79'; Steinkötter (yellow card) 88'	Report	Papadopoulos (yellow card) 83'; Pfanne (yellow card) 87'; Njinmah (yellow card) 90+2'	Stadium: Ludwigsparkstadion; Attendance: 999; Referee: (Germany) Christian Ballweg

29 January 2022 24	Borussia Dortmund II	2 - 2	Osnabrück	Dortmund
14:00 CET	Tigges 35'; Pfanne (yellow card) 52'; Moukoko 60'; Tachie (yellow card) 74'	Report	Taffertshofer (yellow card) 68'; Simakala 73' (pen.) 90+2'; Haas (yellow card) 81'	Stadium: Stadion Rote Erde; Attendance: 750; Referee: (Germany) Lars Erbst

6 February 2022 25	MSV Duisburg	1 - 3	Borussia Dortmund II	Duisburg
14:00 CET	Stoppelkamp 8'; Kwadwo (yellow card) 45+1'; Jander (yellow card) 47'; Knoll (yellow card) 50'	Report	Taz 3' (pen.) 51' (pen.); Pfanne (yellow card) 23'; Njinmah 66'; Pherai (yellow card) 89'	Stadium: Schauinsland-Reisen-Arena; Attendance: 5,747; Referee: (Germany) Patrick Schwengers

12 February 2022 26	Borussia Dortmund II	1 - 0	Havelse	Dortmund
14:00 CET	Hober (yellow card) 15'; Papadopoulos (yellow card) 59'; Tachie 72'	Report	Riedel (yellow card) 5'; Plume (yellow card) 69'	Stadium: Stadion Rote Erde; Attendance: 750; Referee: (Germany) Eric Müller

19 February 2022 27	Magdeburg	2 - 0	Borussia Dortmund II	Magdeburg
14:00 CET	Atik 63' (pen.); Pfanne 67' (o.g.)	Report	Pherai (yellow card) 38'	Stadium: MDCC-Arena; Attendance: 15,000; Referee: (Germany) Frank Willenborg

27 February 2022 28	Borussia Dortmund II	2 - 3	Wehen Wiesbaden	Dortmund
14:00 CET	Papadopoulos (yellow card) 7'; Fink 13'; Njinmah 63'; Maloney (yellow card) 68'; Viet (yellow card) 84'	Report	Kempe (yellow card) 33'; Thiel 45+1'; Gürleyen 50'; Brumme 66'	Stadium: Stadion Rote Erde; Attendance: 1,027; Referee: (Germany) Nicolas Winter

5 March 2022 29	Borussia Dortmund II	3 - 0	Türkgücü München	Dortmund
14:00 CET				Stadium: Stadion Rote Erde

13 March 2022 30	Würzburger Kickers	3 - 1	Borussia Dortmund II	Würzburg
14:00 CET	Breunig 20'; Kopacz 34'; Strohdiek (yellow card) 78'; Sané 87'	Report	Pfanne 4'; Pherai (yellow card) 29'	Stadium: flyeralarm Arena; Attendance: 2,907; Referee: (Germany) Florian Heft

21 March 2022 31	Borussia Dortmund II	0 - 1	Eintracht Braunschweig	Dortmund
19:00 CET	Pfanne (yellow card) 34'; Finnsson (yellow card) 59'; Njinmah (yellow card) 59'; Papadopoulos (yellow card) 72'	Report	Krauße (yellow card) 20'; Multhaup 26'	Stadium: Stadion Rote Erde; Attendance: 2,079; Referee: (Germany) Aarne Aarnink

2 April 2022 32	Viktoria Köln	0 - 2	Borussia Dortmund II	Köln
14:00 CET	Handle (yellow card) 19'; Greger (yellow card) 60'	Report	Pfanne 26' (yellow card) 38'; Tachie (yellow card) 30' (goal) 86'; Hober (yellow card) 39'	Stadium: Sportpark Höhenberg; Attendance: 2,203; Referee: (Germany) Marc Philip Eckermann

9 April 2022 33	Borussia Dortmund II	0 - 1	Viktoria Berlin	Dortmund
14:00 CET	Guille Bueno (yellow card) 63'; Maloney (yellow card) 64'; Tachie (yellow card) 88'	Report	Benyamina 59'; Lewald (yellow card) 83'	Stadium: Stadion Rote Erde; Attendance: 2,319; Referee: (Germany) Patrick Schwengers

16 April 2022 34	Meppen	1 - 1	Borussia Dortmund II	Meppen
14:00 CET	Hemlein 16'; Feigenspan (yellow card) 48'	Report	Njinmah 55'; Kamara (yellow card) 73'; Pherai (yellow card) 90+1'	Stadium: Hänsch-Arena; Attendance: 8,727; Referee: (Germany) Nico Fuchs

23 April 2022 35	Borussia Dortmund II	0 - 0	Hallescher FC	Dortmund
14:00 CET	Pherai (yellow card) 60'; Pfanne (yellow card) 64'; Finnsson (yellow card) 72'; Hober (yellow card) 77'	Report	Löhmannsröben (yellow card) 74'; Zimmerschied (yellow card) 90+1'	Stadium: Signal Iduna Park; Attendance: 3,465; Referee: (Germany) Steven Greif

30 April 2022 36	Kaiserslautern	1 - 3	Borussia Dortmund II	Kaiserslautern
14:00 CET	Winkler (yellow card) 27'; Tomiak (yellow card) 48'; Götze 90+3'	Report	Fink 32'; Njinmah 59'; Pherai (yellow card) 74' (goal) 81'	Stadium: Fritz-Walter-Stadion; Attendance: 48,413; Referee: (Germany) Harm Osmers

6 May 2022 37	Borussia Dortmund II	1 - 2	Verl	Dortmund
19:00 CET	Tachie 39' (yellow card) 66' (yellow-red card) 75'; Maloney (yellow card) 49'; Hober (yellow card) 83'	Report	Baack (yellow card) 44'; Rabihic 56'; Petkov 63' (yellow card) 90+2'; Lannert (yellow card) 71'; Thiede (yellow card) 90+5'	Stadium: Signal Iduna Park; Attendance: 3,076; Referee: (Germany) Dr Martin Thomsen

14 May 2022 38	1860 Munich	6 - 3	Borussia Dortmund II	München
13:30 CET	Lex 18'; Bär 21' 59'; Morgalla (yellow card) 23'; Neudecker (yellow card) 37'; Biankadi 54'; Moll (yellow card) 61'; Deichmann 75'; Dressel 84'	Report	Papadoppoulos 23' (yellow card) 42'; Finnsson (yellow card) 30'; Njinmah 45'; Guille Bueno (yellow card) 65'; Bah-Traoré 83'	Stadium: Grünwalder Stadion; Attendance: 15,000; Referee: (Germany) Daniel Schlager
