= 2024–25 SSV Jahn Regensburg season =

SSV Jahn Regensburg
2024–25 season
- Chairman: Hans Rothammer
- Manager: Andreas Patz
- Stadium: Jahnstadion Regensburg
- 2. Bundesliga: 18 (relegated)
- DFB-Pokal: Round of 16
- Top goalscorer: League: Noah Ganaus (5); All: Noah Ganaus (5)
- Highest home attendance: 15,210 (sell-out)
- Lowest home attendance: 9,048
- Average home league attendance: 12630
- Biggest win: 2–0 vs. Hertha BSC
- Biggest defeat: 6–8 vs. SV Elversberg
Home colours	Away colours	Third colours

The 2024–25 season marks the 118th season in the history of SSV Jahn Regensburg, which will see their return to 2. Bundesliga following successful promotion. In addition to the domestic league, the team participated in the DFB-Pokal where they lost in the round of 16.

With only four points after ten matches and an 3–8 loss against 1. FC Nürnberg, Joe Enochs was fired and assistant manager Andreas Patz took over.

== Transfers ==
=== In ===
Pos.	Player	Transferred from	Fee	Date	Source
FW	(Germany) Noel Eichinger	Greifswalder FC	Loan return	30 June 2024	
FW	(Togo) Mansour Ouro-Tagba	1. FC Köln	Loan	1 July 2024	
FW	(Germany) Christian Kühlwetter	1. FC Heidenheim	Free	1 July 2024	
DF	(Germany) Nico Ochojski	SC Verl		1 July 2024	
FW	(Germany) Dejan Galjen	VfB Stuttgart		1 July 2024	
DF	(Germany) Louis Breunig	1. FC Nürnberg		1 July 2024	
GK	(Germany) Julian Pollersbeck	1. FC Magdeburg		1 July 2024	
MF	(Germany) Kai Pröger	FC Hansa Rostock	Free	1 July 2024	
MF	(Germany) Sebastian Ernst	Hannover 96	Free	1 July 2024	
MF	(Finland) Anssi Suhonen	Hamburger SV	Loan	3 January 2025	
FW	(Armenia) Sargis Adamyan	1. FC Köln	Loan	3 January 2025	
DF	(Germany) Tim Handwerker	1. FC Nürnberg		3 January 2025	
DF	(Germany) Frederic Ananou	Sint-Truidense V.V.		10 January 2025	

=== Out ===
Pos.	Player	Transferred to	Fee	Date	Source
DF	(Germany) Konrad Faber	FC St. Gallen	End of contract	1 July 2024	
MF	(Germany) Erik Tallig		End of contract	1 July 2024	
FW	(Kosovo) Valdrin Mustafa	Kickers Offenbach	End of contract	1 July 2024	
FW	(Germany) Jannik Graf	SpVgg Bayreuth	Loan	1 July 2024	
FW	(Germany) Kelvin Onuigwe	SG Barockstadt Fulda-Lehnerz	Loan	20 August 2024	
FW	(Germany) Noel Eichinger	Lokomotive Leipzig	Loan	31 August 2024	
MF	(Germany) Dominik Kother	Dynamo Dresden		6 January 2025	
FW	(Togo) Mansour Ouro-Tagba	1. FC Köln	End of loan	10 January 2025	
MF	(Germany) Niclas Anspach	FC 08 Homburg		3 February 2025	

== Friendlies ==
=== Pre-season ===
30 June 2024 Friendly	FC Rosenhof-Wolkfshofen	0–8	Jahn Regensburg	Mintraching
		Report	Saller 15'; Ganaus 22', 26', 31', 33', 44'; Kühlwetter 41'; Bauer 43'

30 June 2024 Friendly	FC Tegernheim	0–1	Jahn Regensburg	Mintraching
		Report	Galjen 4'

6 July 2024 Friendly	Jahn Regensburg	3–4	(Austria) SV Ried	Künzing
	Geipl 65'; Kother 71', 107'	Report	Bajic 30'; Große 58'; Eza 92'; Beganović 101'

7 July 2024 Friendly	Jahn Regensburg	2–0	DJK Vilzing	Vilzing
	Ganaus 13'; Bulić 63'	Report		Stadium: Manfred-Zollner-Stadion; Attendance: 1,749

4 July 2024 Friendly	Jahn Regensburg	2–2	SC Eltersdorf	Bad Gögging
15:00	Kother 5'; Ernst 37'	Report	Stark 42'; Beusch 86'	Stadium: Sportanlage Sandharlanden, Platz 1

20 July 2024 Friendly	Stuttgarter Kickers	1–0	Jahn Regensburg	Stuttgart
12:00		Report	Ochojski 53'; Hottmann 56'	Stadium: Gazi-Stadion auf der Waldau

20 July 2024 Friendly	Blau-Weiß Linz (Austria)	1–0	Jahn Regensburg	Stuttgart
14:30	Ronivaldo 36'	Report		Stadium: Gazi-Stadion auf der Waldau

27 July 2024 Friendly	Dynamo Dresden	1–2	Jahn Regensburg	Auerbach
14:00	Daferner 41'	Report	Pröger 75'; Hottmann 115'	Stadium: Arena zur Vogtlandweide

5 September 2024 Friendly	Jahn Regensburg	5–1	SpVgg Unterhaching	Regensburg
13:30	Meyer 7'; Bauer 46'; Ganaus 58'; Hottmann 80'; Anspach 88'	Report	Schmid 29'	Stadium: Sportpark am Kaulbachweg

10 October 2024 Friendly	FC Augsburg	5–1	Jahn Regensburg	Augsburg
14:00		Report	Wolf 30'

7 January 2025 Friendly	Jahn Regensburg	2–1	TSV 1860 Munich	Regensburg
13:00	Hottmann 34'; Hein 75'	Report	Geipl 39' (o.g.)	Stadium: Sportpark am Kaulbachweg

11 January 2025 Friendly	SpVgg Unterhaching	1–4	Jahn Regensburg	Unterhaching
13:00	Jastremski 94'	Report	Suhonen 17', 54'} Ganaus 87'; Bauer 100'	Stadium: uhlsport PARK

== Competitions ==
=== Overall record ===
Competition	First match	Last match	Starting round	Final position	Record							
Competition	First match	Last match	Starting round	Final position	Pld	W	D	L	GF	GA	GD	Win %
2. Bundesliga	3 August 2024	18 May 2025	Matchday 1		34	6	7	21	23	71	−48	17.65
DFB-Pokal	18 August 2024	3 December 2024	First round	Round of 16	3	2	0	1	2	3	−1	66.67
Total					37	8	7	22	25	74	−49	21.62

Source: Competitions

=== 2. Bundesliga ===
==== League table ====
Pos	Team	Pld	W	D	L	GF	GA	GD	Pts	Promotion, qualification or relegation
14	Schalke 04	34	10	8	16	52	62	−10	38	
15	Preußen Münster	34	8	12	14	40	43	−3	36	
16	Eintracht Braunschweig (O)	34	8	11	15	38	64	−26	35	Qualification for relegation play-offs
17	SSV Ulm (R)	34	6	12	16	36	48	−12	30	Relegation to 3. Liga
18	Jahn Regensburg (R)	34	6	7	21	23	71	−48	25	Relegation to 3. Liga

Source: Bundesliga
Rules for classification: 1) Points; 2) Goal difference; 3) Goals scored; 4) Head-to-head results; 5) Head-to-head away goals scored; 6) Away goals scored; 7) Play-off.
(Rules 4–6 only apply after home and away matches have been played between the tied teams.)
(O) Play-off winners; (R) Relegated

==== Results summary ====
Overall								Home						Away					
Pld	W	D	L	GF	GA	GD	Pts	W	D	L	GF	GA	GD	W	D	L	GF	GA	GD
34	6	7	21	23	71	−48	25	6	5	6	14	19	−5	0	2	15	9	52	−43

==== Results by round ====
Round	1	2	3	4	5	6	7	8	9	10	11	12	13	14	15	16	17	18	19	20	21	22	23	24	25	26	27	28	29	30	31	32	33	34
Ground	A	H	A	H	A	H	H	A	H	A	H	A	H	A	H	A	H	H	A	H	A	H	A	A	H	A	H	A	H	A	H	A	H	A
Result	L	W	L	L	L	L	D	L	L	L	W	L	L	D	L	L	W	L	L	W	L	D	L	L	D	L	W	L	W	L	D	D	D	L
Position	16	11	13	14	14	18	18	18	18	18	18	18	18	18	18	18	18	18	18	18	18	18	18	18	18	18	18	18	18	18	18	18	18	18

A = Away; H = Home; W = Win; D = Draw; L = Loss

==== Matches ====
The match schedule was released on 4 July 2024.

3 August 2024 Matchday 1	Hannover 96	2–0	Jahn Regensburg	Hanover
13:30	Tresoldi 11'; Dehm 23'	Report		Stadium: Niedersachsenstadion; Attendance: 31,800; Referee: Michael Bacher

9 August 2024 Matchday 2	Jahn Regensburg	1–0	SSV Ulm 1846	Regensburg
18:30	Kother 34'	Report		Stadium: Jahnstadion; Attendance: 12,095; Referee: Lukas Benen

24 August 2024 Matchday 3	Hertha BSC	2–0	Jahn Regensburg	Berlin
13:00	Gebhardt 90' (o.g.); Niederlechner 90+6'	Report		Stadium: Olympiastadion; Attendance: 42,355; Referee: Richard Hempel

30 August 2024 Matchday 4	Jahn Regensburg	0–4	SpVgg Greuther Fürth	Regensburg
18:30		Report	Meyerhöfer 4'; Futkeu 49'; Hrgota 77'; Green 88'	Stadium: Jahnstadion; Attendance: 13,105; Referee: Patrick Schwengers

15 September 2024 Matchday 5	Hamburger SV	5–0	Jahn Regensburg	Hamburg
13:30	Königsdürffer 1'; Glatzel 14'; Dompé 76', 90+3'; Selke 89'	Report		Stadium: Volksparkstadion; Attendance: 53,779; Referee: Robin Braun

22 September 2024 Matchday 6	Jahn Regensburg	0–3	SC Preußen Münster	Regensburg
13:30		Report	Grodowski 29'; Makridis 60'; Friðjónsson 71'	Stadium: Jahnstadion; Attendance: 12,554; Referee: Florian Lechner

28 September 2024 Matchday 7	Jahn Regensburg	0–0	1. FC Kaiserslautern	Regensburg
13:00		Report		Stadium: Jahnstadion; Attendance: 14,431; Referee: Max Burda

4 October 2024 Matchday 8	SC Paderborn 07	3–0	Jahn Regensburg	Paderborn
18:30	Klaas 14'; Zehnter 65'; Kinsombi 81'	Report		Stadium: Benteler-Arena; Attendance: 12,615; Referee: Felix Prigan

19 October 2024 Matchday 9	Jahn Regensburg	0–3	Fortuna Düsseldorf	Regensburg
13:00		Report	Oberdorf 44'; Kownacki 81'; Vermeij 89' (pen.)	Stadium: Jahnstadion; Attendance: 12,310; Referee: Lukas Benen

25 October 2024 Matchday 10	1. FC Nürnberg	8–3	Jahn Regensburg	Nuremberg
18:30	Tzimas 15'; Emreli 23'; Justvan 45+1', 59', 74' (pen.); Schleimer 80'; Castrop 83'; Breunig 90+1' (o.g.)	Report	Hottmann 36'; Viet 42' (pen.); Pröger 49'	Stadium: Max-Morlock-Stadion; Attendance: 36,152; Referee: Robin Braun

2 November 2024 Matchday 11	Jahn Regensburg	1–0	SV Elversberg	Regensburg
13:00	Ganaus 16'	Report		Stadium: Jahnstadion; Attendance: 9,048; Referee: Eric Weisbach

10 November 2024 Matchday 12	FC Schalke 04	2–0	Jahn Regensburg	Gelsenkirchen
13:30	Karaman 16'; Sylla 53'	Report		Stadium: Veltins-Arena; Attendance: 60,000; Referee: Patrick Schwengers

24 November 2024 Matchday 13	Jahn Regensburg	0–1	1. FC Magdeburg	Regensburg
13:30		Report	El Hankouri 10'	Stadium: Jahnstadion; Attendance: 11,077; Referee: Florian Heft

30 November 2024 Matchday 14	Eintracht Braunschweig	0–0	Jahn Regensburg	Braunschweig
13:00		Report		Stadium: Eintracht-Stadion; Attendance: 19,540; Referee: Patrick Alt

8 December 2024 Matchday 15	Jahn Regensburg	0–1	1. FC Köln	Regensburg
13:30		Report	Lemperle 33'	Stadium: Jahnstadion; Attendance: 14,232; Referee: Konrad Oldhafer

13 December 2024 Matchday 16	Karlsruher SC	4–2	Jahn Regensburg	Karlsruhe
18:30	Zivzivadze 45+2', 62'; Wanitzek 56' (pen.); Schleusener 86'	Report	Kühlwetter 19' (pen.); Hottmann 49'	Stadium: BBBank Wildpark; Attendance: 24,158; Referee: Felix Prigan

22 December 2024 Matchday 17	Jahn Regensburg	2–1	SV Darmstadt 98	Regensburg
13:30	Pröger 65'; Ganaus 90+1'	Report	Klefisch 90+3'	Stadium: Jahnstadion; Attendance: 10,008; Referee: Tom Bauer

17 January 2025 Matchday 18	Jahn Regensburg	0–1	Hannover 96	Regensburg
18:30		Report	Ngankam 35'	Stadium: Jahnstadion; Attendance: 11,310; Referee: Richard Hempel

26 January 2025 Matchday 19	SSV Ulm 1846	5–1	Jahn Regensburg	Ulm
13:30	Telalović 24', 34', 45+1', 79'; Batista Meier 55'	Report	Ganaus 90+2'	Stadium: Donaustadion; Attendance: 14,012; Referee: Eric Weisbach

1 February 2025 Matchday 20	Jahn Regensburg	2–0	Hertha BSC	Regensburg
13:00	Kühlwetter 45' (pen.); Huth 90+2'	Report		Stadium: Jahnstadion; Attendance: 12,025; Referee: Robert Kampka

7 February 2025 Matchday 21	SpVgg Greuther Fürth	2–1	Jahn Regensburg	Fürth
18:30	Consbruch 31'; Srbeny 31'	Report	Adamyan 6'	Stadium: Sportpark Ronhof; Attendance: 12,586; Referee: Florian Lechner

16 February 2025 Matchday 22	Jahn Regensburg	1–1	Hamburger SV	Regensburg
13:30	Adamyan 6'	Report	Selke 83' (pen.)	Stadium: Jahnstadion; Attendance: 15,210 (sell-out); Referee: Lars Erbst

22 February 2025 Matchday 23	SC Preußen Münster	2–0	Jahn Regensburg	Münster
13:00	Friðjónsson 42'; Scherder 69'	Report		Stadium: Preußenstadion; Attendance: 11,586; Referee: Felix Prigan

1 March 2025 Matchday 24	1. FC Kaiserslautern	3–0	Jahn Regensburg	Kaiserslautern
13:00	Ache 47', 70'; Ritter 51'	Report		Stadium: Fritz-Walter-Stadion; Attendance: 41,579; Referee: Robin Braun

9 March 2025 Matchday 25	Jahn Regensburg	0–0	SC Paderborn 07	Regensburg
13:30		Report		Stadium: Jahnstadion; Attendance: 10,398; Referee: Lukas Benen

15 March 2025 Matchday 26	Fortuna Düsseldorf	1–0	Jahn Regensburg	Düsseldorf
13:00	Zimmermann 41'	Report		Stadium: Merkur Spiel-Arena; Attendance: 31,951; Referee: Patrick Kessel

30 March 2025 Matchday 27	Jahn Regensburg	2–1	1. FC Nürnberg	Regensburg
13:30	Flick 47'; Ganaus 55'	Report	Antiste 11'	Stadium: Jahnstadion; Attendance: 15,210 (sell-out); Referee: Timo Gansloweit

6 April 2025 Matchday 28	SV Elversberg	6–0	Jahn Regensburg	Elversberg
13:30	Zimmerschied 13'; Sickinger 36' (pen.); Asllani 43' (87); Sahin 57'; Fellhauer 65'	Report		Stadium: Waldstadion an der Kaiserlinde; Attendance: 10,786; Referee: Richard Hempel

13 April 2025 Matchday 29	Jahn Regensburg	2–0	FC Schalke 04	Regensburg
13:30	Kühlwetter 21'; Galjen 90+3'			Stadium: Jahnstadion; Attendance: 15,210 (sell-out); Referee: Wolfgang Haslberger

20 April 2025 Matchday 30	1. FC Magdeburg	3–0	Jahn Regensburg	Magdeburg
13:30	Kaars 28'; El-Zein 51'; Hercher 72'	Report		Stadium: MDCC-Arena; Attendance: 26,020; Referee: Deniz Aytekin

26 April 2025 Matchday 31	Jahn Regensburg	1–1	Eintracht Braunschweig	Regensburg
13:00	Ziegele 4'	Report	Nikolaou 6'	Stadium: Jahnstadion; Attendance: 13,773; Referee: Lars Erbst

3 May 2025 Matchday 32	1. FC Köln	1–1	Jahn Regensburg	Cologne
20:30	Lemperle 59'	Report	Ganaus 76'	Stadium: RheinEnergieStadion; Attendance: 49,500; Referee: Nicolas Winter

11 May 2025 Matchday 33	Jahn Regensburg	2–2	Karlsruher SC	Regensburg
13:30	Bulić 17'; Hottmann 66'	Report	Wanitzek 4'; Burnić 31'	Stadium: Jahnstadion; Attendance: Eric Weisbach; Referee: 12,708

18 May 2025 Matchday 34	SV Darmstadt 98	3–1	Jahn Regensburg	Darmstadt
15:30	Hornby 57', 64'; Müller 90+4'	Report	Wurm 8'	Stadium: Merck-Stadion am Böllenfalltor; Attendance: 16,966; Referee: Nicolas Winter

=== DFB-Pokal ===
18 August 2024 First round	Jahn Regensburg	1–0	VfL Bochum	Regensburg
15:30	Ballas 70'	Report		Stadium: Jahnstadion Regensburg; Attendance: 12,581; Referee: Florian Heft

29 October 2024 Second round	Jahn Regensburg	1–0	SpVgg Greuther Fürth	Regensburg
20:45	Bulić 59'	Report		Stadium: Jahnstadion Regensburg; Attendance: 11,627; Referee: Tom Bauer

3 December 2024 Round of 16	Jahn Regensburg	0–3	VfB Stuttgart	Regensburg
18:00		Report	Millot 10'; Chase 19'; Woltemade 61'	Stadium: Jahnstadion Regensburg; Attendance: 15,210 (sell-out); Referee: Floria Badstübner
