= Hober =

Hober or Höber is a surname. Notable people with the surname include:

- Heinz Werner Höber (1931–1996), very prolific German pulp fiction novelist
- Marco Hober (born 1995), German footballer
- Rudolf Höber (1873–1953), German physician-investigator
- Sophia Hober (born 1965), Swedish researcher

== See also ==
- Diny Hobers (born 1932), Dutch retired high jumper
