= Gerezgiher =

Gerezgiher is a surname. Notable people with the surname include:

- Filimon Gerezgiher (born 2000), German football winger
- Joel Gerezgiher (born 1995), German football attacking midfielder
