= Noel Eichinger =

German footballer

Personal information
- Date of birth: 2 August 2001 (age 25)
- Place of birth: Mainz, Germany
- Height: 1.83 m (6 ft 0 in)
- Position: Centre-forward

Team information
- Current team: Karlsruher SC
- Number: 11

Youth career
- –2017: TSG 1846 Bretzenheim
- 2017–2020: SV Wehen Wiesbaden

Senior career*
Years	Team	Apps	(Gls)
2020–2022	Wormatia Worms		
2022–2023	FSV Zwickau	28	(2)
2023–2026	Jahn Regensburg	39	(10)
2023–2026	Jahn Regensburg II	8	(3)
2024	→ Greifswalder FC (loan)	10	(0)
2024–2025	→ Lokomotive Leipzig (loan)	24	(8)
2026–	Karlsruher SC	0	(0)
- * Club domestic league appearances and goals as of 19:29, 18 May 2026 (UTC)

Noel Eichinger (born 2 August 2001) is a German footballer who played as a centre-forward for 2. Bundesliga club Karlsruher SC.

== Career ==
=== Wormatia Worms ===
Eichinger began his senior career with Wormatia Worms, joining the club after three years spent in the youth academy at SV Wehen Wiesbaden. In his first season with the team, he scored two goals across ten competitive appearances, receiving a one-year contract extension in the summer of 2021. Upon the expiry of his contract prior to the 2022–23 season, he departed the team, following 32 appearances and 17 goals across all competitions with the club.

=== FSV Zwickau ===
In early July 2022, Eichinger went on trial with 3. Liga club FSV Zwickau, joining the team's Austria training camp. On 13 July, the club announced that Eichinger had signed a two-year professional contract with the club, marking the team's eighth signing of the summer. He made his competitive debut in the club's opening match of the season, coming on as a 65th-minute substitute for Ronny König in a 3–2 victory over Hallescher FC. In that match, Eichinger scored his first professional goal, making the score 3–1 in favor of Zwickau. He would play three more games for the club during the month of August, before breaking his right metatarsal in training prior to the match against SpVgg Bayreuth. He would return at the end of October, registering an assist in his second game back from injury as Zwickau secured a critical victory over VfL Osnabrück.

=== Jahn Regensburg ===
Following Zwickau's relegation from the 3. Liga at the end of the 2022–23 season, Eichinger followed former head coach Joe Enochs to Jahn Regensburg. He made his competitive debut for the club on 14 August 2023, coming on as a substitute for Dominik Kother in the 88th minute of a 2–1 first round DFB-Pokal defeat to FC Magdeburg. In January 2024, after finding himself on the fringes of the first team at Jahn Regensburg, Eichinger was loaned to Greifswalder FC for the remainder of the season.

On 31 August 2024, Eichinger moved on loan to Lokomotive Leipzig in Regionalliga.

== Career statistics ==
=== Club ===
As of match played 16 May 2026

Appearances and goals by club, season and competition
Club	Season	League			Cup		Other		Total	
Club	Season	Division	Apps	Goals	Apps	Goals	Apps	Goals	Apps	Goals
FSV Zwickau	2022–23	3. Liga	28	2	—		—		28	2
SSV Jahn Regensburg	2023–24	3. Liga	3	0	1 (Note: Appearance(s) in DFB-Pokal)	0	—		4	0
SSV Jahn Regensburg	2024–25	2. Bundesliga	0	0	0	0	—		0	0
SSV Jahn Regensburg	2025–26	3. Liga	36	10	1 (Note: Appearance(s) in DFB-Pokal)	0	—		37	10
SSV Jahn Regensburg	Total		39	10	2	0	—		41	10
Greifswalder FC (loan)	2023–24	Regionalliga	10	0	—		—		10	0
Lokomotive Leipzig (loan)	2024–25	Regionalliga	24	8	—		2	0	26	8
Karlsruher SC	2026–27	Regionalliga	0	0	—		0	0	0	0
Career total			101	20	2	0	2	0	105	20
