= Noah Ganaus =

German footballer (born 2001)

Personal information
- Full name: Noah Solomon Ganaus
- Date of birth: 19 January 2001 (age 25)
- Place of birth: Nürtingen, Germany
- Height: 1.93 m (6 ft 4 in)
- Position: Forward

Team information
- Current team: OB
- Number: 17

Youth career
- TSV Oberensingen
- –2018: VfB Stuttgart
- 2018–2019: Stuttgarter Kickers
- 2019–2020: Chemnitzer FC

Senior career*
Years	Team	Apps	(Gls)
2020–2022	SSV Reutlingen 05	26	(10)
2022–2023	VfB Stuttgart II	41	(14)
2023–2025	SSV Jahn Regensburg	67	(16)
2025–	OB	32	(11)
- * Club domestic league appearances and goals as of 19 May 2026

Noah Solomon Ganaus (born 19 January 2001) is a German professional footballer who plays as a forward for Danish Superliga club OB.

== Early life ==
Ganaus was born on 19 January 2001 in Nürtingen, Germany.

== Career ==
As a youth player, Ganaus joined the youth academy of German side TSV Oberensingen. Following his stint there, he joined the youth academy of German Bundesliga side VfB Stuttgart. One year later, he joined the youth academy of German side Stuttgarter Kickers before joining the youth academy of German side Chemnitzer FC in 2019. In 2020, he signed for German side SSV Reutlingen 05, where he made twenty-six league appearances and scored ten goals.

Two years later, he signed for German side VfB Stuttgart II, where he made forty-one league appearances and scored fourteen goals. During the summer of 2023, he signed for German side SSV Jahn Regensburg, where he made sixty-seven league appearances and scored sixteen goals and helped the club achieve promotion from the third tier to the second tier. Ahead of the 2025–26 season, he signed for Danish side Odense Boldklub. On 20 July 2025, he debuted and scored his first goal for the club during a 3–3 away draw with FC Midtjylland in the league.

== Style of play ==
Ganaus plays as a forward. Right-footed, he is known for his speed.

== Career statistics ==
As of match played 12 April 2026

Appearances and goals by club, season and competition
Club	Season	League			National cup (Note: Includes DFB-Pokal, Danish Cup)		Other		Total	
Club	Season	Division	Apps	Goals	Apps	Goals	Apps	Goals	Apps	Goals
Jahn Regensburg	2023–24	3. Liga	33	10	0	0	2 (Note: Appearances in 2. Bundesliga promotion play-offs)	1	35	11
Jahn Regensburg	2024–25	2. Bundesliga	32	5	3	0	–		35	5
Jahn Regensburg	Total		65	15	3	0	2	1	70	16
OB	2025–26	Danish Superliga	26	10	5	3	–		31	13
Career total			91	25	8	3	2	1	101	29
