= Dejan Galjen =

German footballer (born 2002)

Personal information
- Date of birth: 25 February 2002 (age 24)
- Place of birth: Pforzheim, Germany
- Height: 1.87 m (6 ft 2 in)
- Position: Forward

Team information
- Current team: Eintracht Trier
- Number: 9

Youth career
- 2017–2019: TSG Hoffenheim
- 2019–2021: Karlsruher SC

Senior career*
Years	Team	Apps	(Gls)
2021	Karlsruher SC	2	(0)
2021–2023	Werder Bremen II	31	(6)
2021–2023	Werder Bremen	1	(0)
2023–2024	VfB Stuttgart II	29	(21)
2024–2026	Jahn Regensburg	18	(1)
2024–2026	Jahn Regensburg II	4	(0)
2026	Fortuna Köln	11	(1)
2026–	Eintracht Trier	4	(0)
- * Club domestic league appearances and goals as of 24 September 2026

Dejan Galjen (born 25 February 2002) is a German professional footballer who plays as a forward for Regionalliga Südwest club Eintracht Trier.

== Career ==
Born in Pforzheim, Galjen started his youth career at TSG Hoffenheim before switching to Karlsruher SC in 2019. He made his debut for Karlsruhe on 26 April 2021 as a substitute in a 0–0 draw with Erzgebirge Aue. He signed for the reserve team of Werder Bremen in July 2021, and made his debut for them on 13 August 2021 in a 3–0 Regionalliga Nord defeat to VfB Oldenburg. He made his debut for Werder Bremen as a substitute in a 0–0 draw with Karlsruher SC on 21 August 2021.

In summer 2023, he joined VfB Stuttgart II. After one season, he moved to SSV Jahn Regensburg.

== Career statistics ==
As of match played 23 May 2026

Appearances and goals by club, season and competition
Club	Season	League			DFB-Pokal		Europe		Other		Total	
Club	Season	Division	Apps	Goals	Apps	Goals	Apps	Goals	Apps	Goals	Apps	Goals
Karlsruher SC	2020–21	2. Bundesliga	2	0	0	0	—		0	0	2	0
Werder Bremen	2021–22	2. Bundesliga	1	0	0	0	—		0	0	1	0
Werder Bremen II	2021–22	Regionalliga Nord	1	0	0	0	—		0	0	1	0
Werder Bremen II	2022–23	Regionalliga Nord	30	6	0	0	—		0	0	30	6
Werder Bremen II	Total		31	6	0	0	—		0	0	31	6
VfB Stuttgart II	2023–24	Regionalliga Südwest	29	21	—		—		—		29	21
Jahn Regensburg	2024–25	2. Bundesliga	11	1	1	0	—		—		12	1
Jahn Regensburg	2025–26	3. Liga	7	0	0	0	—		—		7	0
Jahn Regensburg	Total		18	1	1	0	—		0	0	19	1
Fortuna Köln	2025–26	Regionalliga West	11	1	—		—		2 (Note: Appearances in Middle Rhine Cup)	0	13	1
Career total			92	29	1	0	—		2	0	95	29

== Honours ==
Fortuna Köln

- Regionalliga West: 2025–26
