= Immanuel Pherai =

Surinamese footballer (born 2001)

Immanuël Pherai
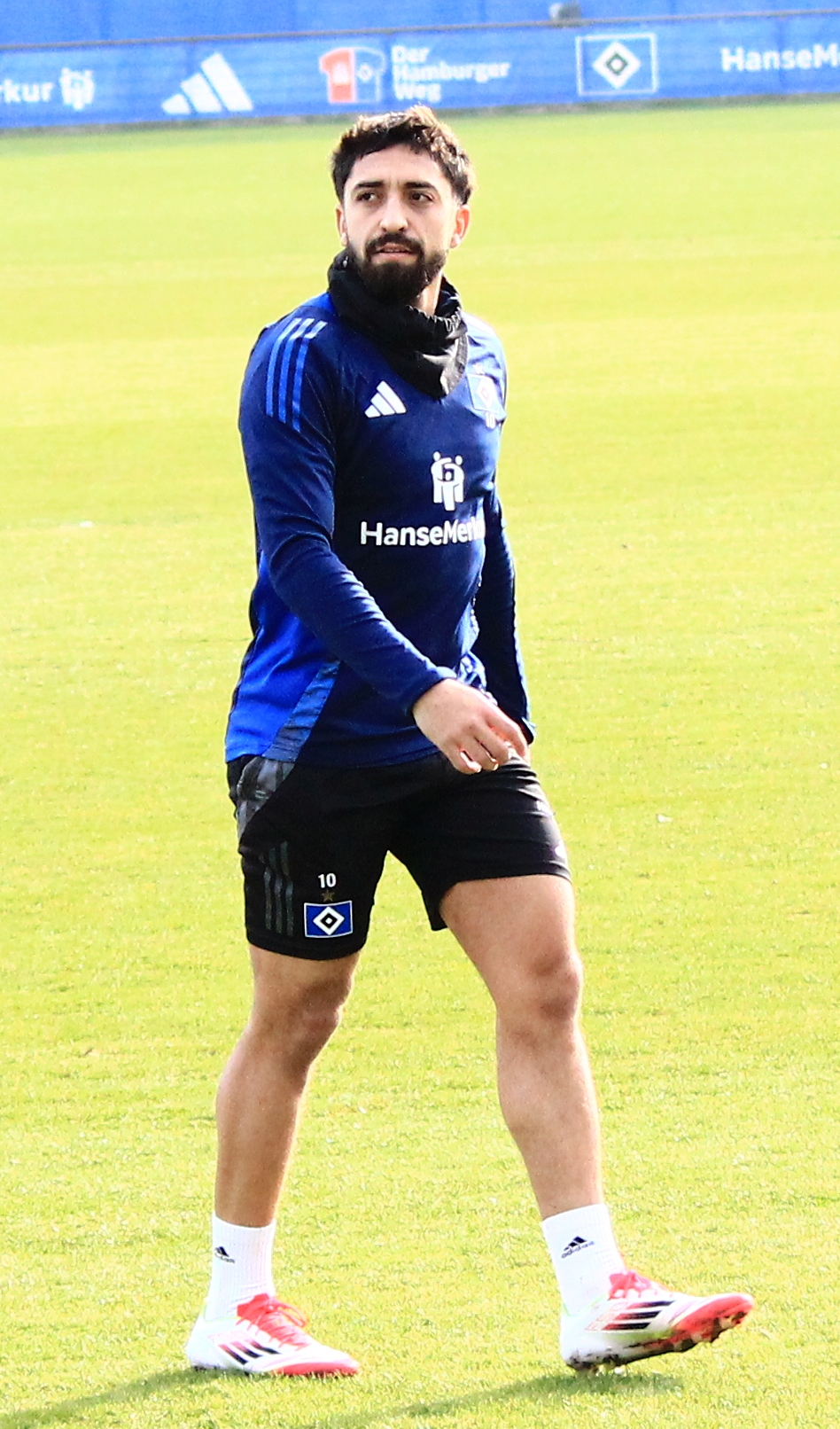
- Pherai with Hamburger SV in 2025

Personal information
- Full name: Immanuël-Johannes Pherai
- Date of birth: 25 April 2001 (age 25)
- Place of birth: Amsterdam, Netherlands
- Height: 1.75 m (5 ft 9 in)
- Position: Midfielder

Team information
- Current team: Hamburger SV
- Number: 10

Youth career
- –2013: Amsterdamsche FC
- 2013–2017: AZ
- 2017–2020: Borussia Dortmund

Senior career*
Years	Team	Apps	(Gls)
2017	Jong AZ	1	(0)
2020–2022	Borussia Dortmund	1	(0)
2020–2021	→ PEC Zwolle (loan)	27	(2)
2021–2022	Borussia Dortmund II	31	(6)
2022–2023	Eintracht Braunschweig	27	(9)
2023–	Hamburger SV	53	(3)
2025–	Hamburger SV II	5	(4)
2026	→ SV Elversberg (loan)	13	(2)

International career^{‡}
2015–2016	Netherlands U15	9	(1)
2016–2017	Netherlands U16	11	(1)
2017–2018	Netherlands U17	6	(3)
2018–2019	Netherlands U18	8	(2)
2019	Netherlands U19	3	(0)
2024–	Suriname	11	(1)
- * Club domestic league appearances and goals as of 22 September 2026 ‡ National team caps and goals as of 23:53, 22 June 2025 (UTC)

Immanuël-Johannes Pherai (born 25 April 2001) is a professional footballer who plays as a midfielder for German Bundesliga club Hamburger SV. Born in the Netherlands, he plays for the Suriname national team.

== Club career ==
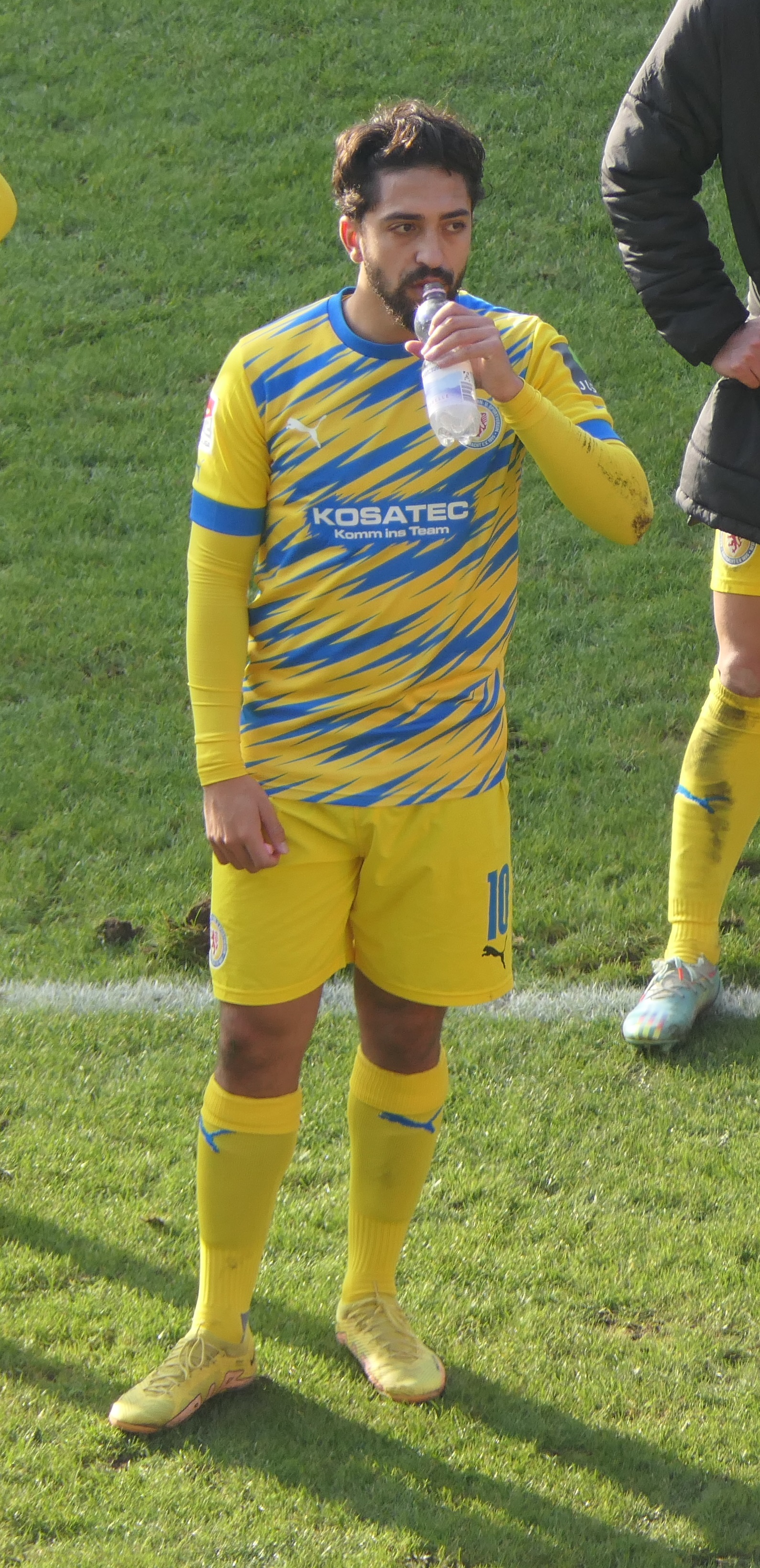
Pherai with Eintracht Braunschweig in 2023

Pherai was loaned from Borussia Dortmund to PEC Zwolle on 17 September 2020. He made his professional debut for Zwolle in the Eredivisie two days later, coming on as a substitute in the 76th minute for Jesper Drost against AZ, with the match finishing as a 1–1 away draw.

Ahead of the 2021–22 season, Pherai returned to Dortmund, and scored on his Borussia Dortmund II debut, a 2–1 win vs. FSV Zwickau. He made his Bundesliga debut for the main Borussia squad on 7 May 2022 in a 3–1 victory against Greuther Fürth, substituting Marco Reus in added time.

On 22 June 2022, Pherai signed a two-year contract with Eintracht Braunschweig in 2. Bundesliga.

On 2 February 2026, Pherai joined SV Elversberg on loan with an option to buy.

== International career ==
Pherai was born in the Netherlands to a Indo-Surinamese father and Brazilian mother. He is a former youth international for the Netherlands. He was called up to the Suriname national team for a set of World Cup qualifier matches in June 2024.

Pherai made his debut on 5 June 2024 against Saint Vincent and the Grenadines at the Dr. Ir. Franklin Essed Stadion. He started the game and played 75 minutes, recording an assist and earning a penalty kick, as Suriname won 4–1.

== Career statistics ==
=== Club ===
As of match played 17 May 2026

Appearances and goals by club, season and competition
Club	Season	League			National cup (Note: Includes KNVB Cup, DFB-Pokal)		Europe		Other		Total	
Club	Season	Division	Apps	Goals	Apps	Goals	Apps	Goals	Apps	Goals	Apps	Goals
Jong AZ	2016–17	Tweede Divisie	1	0	—		—		—		1	0
Borussia Dortmund	2019–20	Bundesliga	0	0	0	0	0	0	—		0	0
Borussia Dortmund	2020–21	Bundesliga	0	0	0	0	0	0	—		0	0
Borussia Dortmund	2021–22	Bundesliga	1	0	0	0	0	0	—		1	0
Borussia Dortmund	Total		1	0	0	0	0	0	0	0	1	0
PEC Zwolle (loan)	2020–21	Eredivisie	27	2	1	0	—		—		28	2
Borussia Dortmund II	2021–22	3. Liga	31	6	—		—		—		31	6
Eintracht Braunschweig	2022–23	2. Bundesliga	27	9	2	1	—		—		29	10
Hamburger SV	2023–24	2. Bundesliga	29	3	2	1	—		—		31	4
Hamburger SV	2024–25	2. Bundesliga	18	0	1	2	—		—		19	2
Hamburger SV	2025–26	Bundesliga	6	0	1	0	—		—		7	0
Hamburger SV	Total		53	3	4	3	—		—		57	6
SV Elversberg (loan)	2025–26	2. Bundesliga	13	2	—		—		—		13	2
Career total			153	22	7	4	0	0	0	0	160	26

=== International ===
As of match played 22 June 2025

Appearances and goals by national team and year
National team	Year	Apps	Goals
Suriname	2024	7	0
Suriname	2025	4	1
Total		11	1

Scores and results list Suriname's goal tally first, score column indicates score after each Pherai goal.

List of international goals scored by Immanuël Pherai
No.	Date	Venue	Opponent	Score	Result	Competition
1	25 March 2025	Stade Pierre-Aliker, Fort-de-France, Martinique	Martinique	1–0	1–0	2025 CONCACAF Gold Cup qualification
