= Sophia Hober =

Swedish Researcher (born 1965)

Sophia Hober (born 1965) is a Swedish researcher in biotechnology and professor at The Royal Institute of Technology (KTH) in Stockholm. Sophia Hober got her Master of Science in chemical engineering at KTH in 1989 and defended her doctorate in biochemistry in 1996. Since 2007, Hober is a professor of molecular biotechnology at KTH. During 2011–2015, Professor Hober served as dean at KTH and was part of the management team. Sophia Hober was elected member of the Royal Swedish Academy of Engineering Sciences in 2012.

Hober's research is centered around the development of affinity proteins for use in biotechnology and medicine. Her main scientific achievements in the field of protein purification include improvements of the alkaline tolerance of protein A for the industrial purification of monoclonal antibodies. This work led to the product MabSelect SuRe, currently sold by Cytiva. Professor Hober has also developed a new protein domain with calcium-dependent affinity that can be used for gentle purification of monoclonal antibodies. Further in her work she has developed protein domains with the ability to strongly and selectively bind cancer markers. One of these has, in clinical trials, been shown to work very well for the precision diagnosis of cancer in situ. Hober is, among others, a co-founder of the biotechnology companies Affibody AB and Atlas Antibodies AB.

== Awards ==
- 2013, International Society for Molecular Recognition (ISMR)
- 2015, Janne Carlsson's prize for academic leadership, KTH
- 2022, The Westrup prize, The Royal Physiographic Society of Lund
- 2022, Alum of the Year, KTH
