= Timo Bornemann =

German footballer

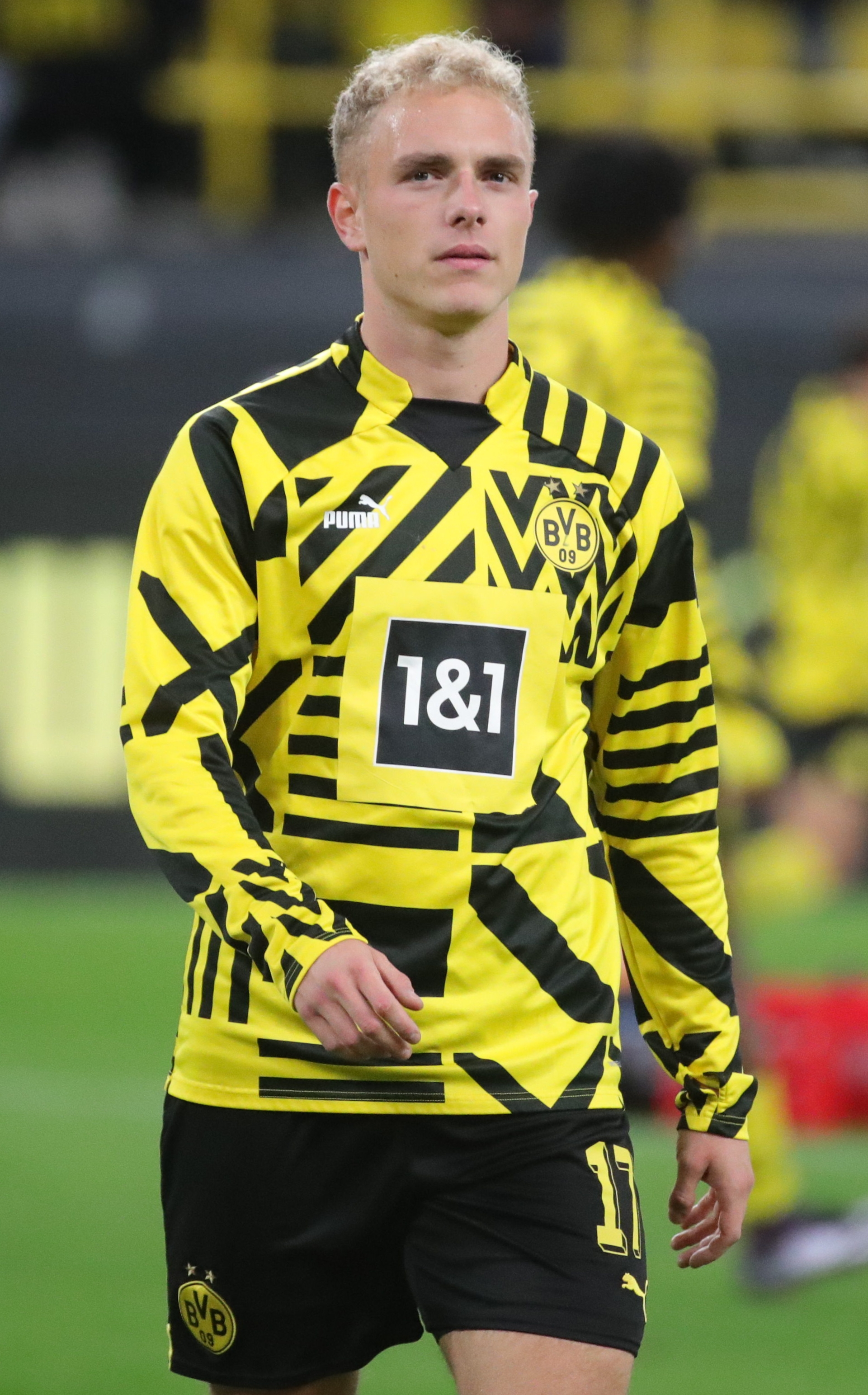
- Bornemann with Borussia Dortmund II in 2022

Personal information
- Date of birth: 1 December 2000 (age 25)
- Place of birth: Ratingen, Germany
- Height: 1.86 m (6 ft 1 in)
- Position: Forward

Team information
- Current team: Fortuna Köln
- Number: 19

Youth career
- ASV Tiefenbroich
- –2015: SG Unterrath
- 2015–2021: Fortuna Düsseldorf

Senior career*
Years	Team	Apps	(Gls)
2019–2021	Fortuna Düsseldorf II	42	(11)
2021–2023	Borussia Dortmund II	25	(4)
2023–2024	Energie Cottbus	3	(0)
2024	→ Wegberg-Beeck (loan)	12	(4)
2024–2025	Wuppertaler SV	24	(6)
2025–	Fortuna Köln	27	(10)
- * Club domestic league appearances and goals as of 18:32, 4 June 2026 (UTC)

Timo Bornemann (born 1 December 2000) is a German professional footballer who plays as a forward for 3. Liga club Fortuna Köln.

== Club career ==
Bornemann played youth football for ASV Tiefenbroich and SG Unterrath before signing with Fortuna Düsseldorf in 2015.

On 2 August 2023, Bornemann signed with Regionalliga Nordost club Energie Cottbus.

== Career statistics ==
As of match played 23 May 2026

Appearances and goals by club, season and competition
Club	Season	League			DFB-Pokal		Europe		Other		Total	
Club	Season	Division	Apps	Goals	Apps	Goals	Apps	Goals	Apps	Goals	Apps	Goals
Fortuna Düsseldorf II	2020–21	Regionalliga West	4	2	—		—		0	0	4	2
Fortuna Düsseldorf II	2020–21	Regionalliga West	19	4	—		—		0	0	19	4
Fortuna Düsseldorf II	2020–21	Regionalliga West	19	5	—		—		0	0	19	5
Fortuna Düsseldorf II	Total		42	11	—		—		0	0	42	11
Borussia Dortmund II	2021–22	3. Liga	22	3	—		—		0	0	22	3
Borussia Dortmund II	2023–24	3. Liga	3	1	—		—		0	0	3	1
Borussia Dortmund II	Total		25	4	—		—		0	0	25	4
Energie Cottbus	2023–24	Regionalliga Nordost	3	0	—		—		2 (Note: Appearances in Brandenburg Cup)	0	5	0
Wegberg-Beeck (loan)	2023–24	Regionalliga West	12	4	—		—		0	0	12	4
Wuppertaler SV	2024–25	Regionalliga West	24	6	—		—		2 (Note: Appearances in Lower Rhine Cup)	0	26	6
Fortuna Köln	2025–26	Regionalliga West	27	10	—		—		6 (Note: Appearances in Middle Rhine Cup)	3	33	13
Career total			133	35	0	0	0	0	10	3	143	38

== Honours ==
Fortuna Köln

- Regionalliga West: 2025–26
