= Dominik Kother =

German footballer

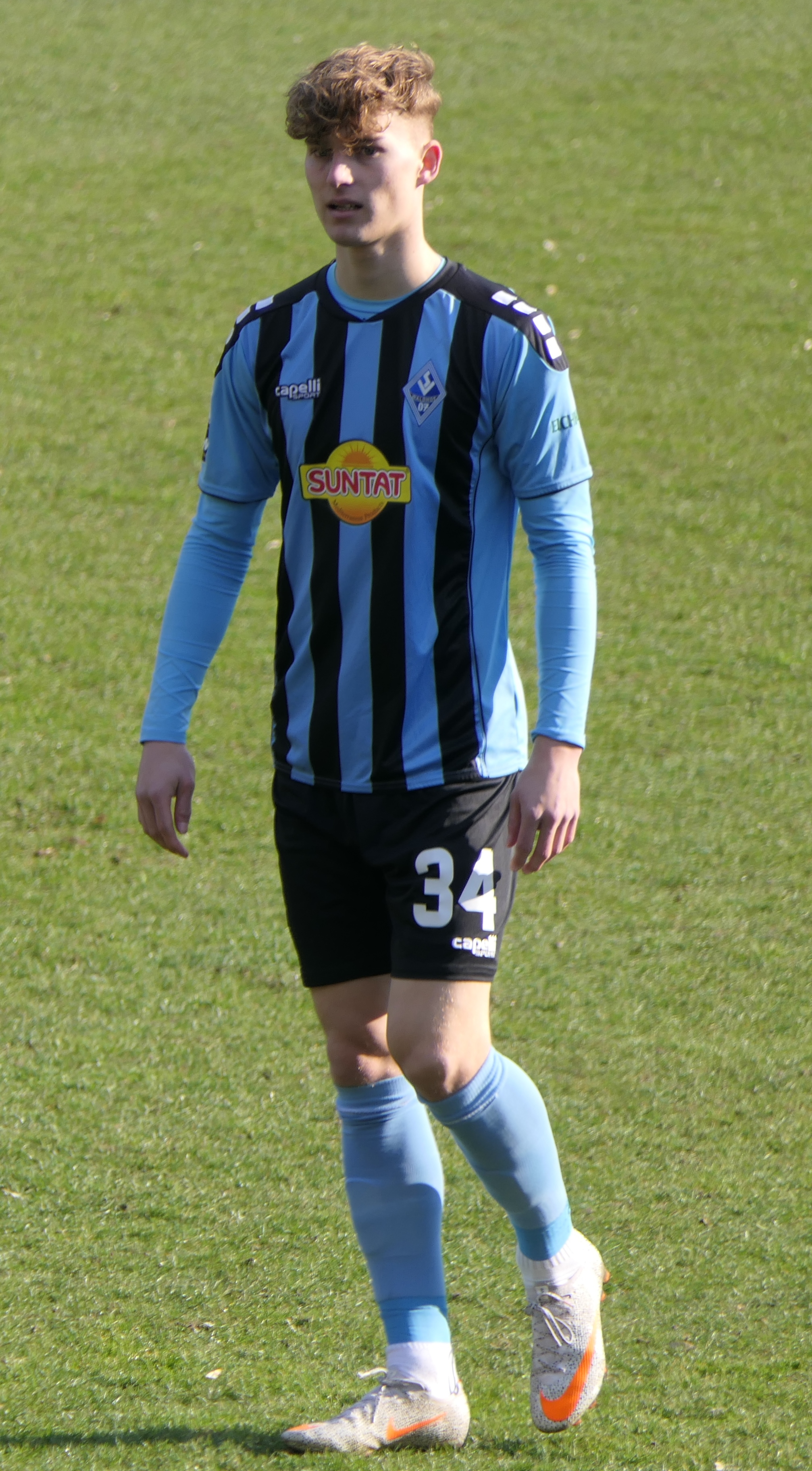

Personal information
- Date of birth: 16 March 2000 (age 26)
- Place of birth: Bruchsal, Germany
- Height: 1.80 m (5 ft 11 in)
- Position: Forward

Team information
- Current team: MSV Duisburg
- Number: 11

Youth career
- 2009–2019: Karlsruher SC

Senior career*
Years	Team	Apps	(Gls)
2019–2023	Karlsruher SC	41	(5)
2022–2023	→ Waldhof Mannheim (loan)	40	(6)
2023–2025	Jahn Regensburg	51	(11)
2025–2026	Dynamo Dresden	30	(7)
2026	→ MSV Duisburg (loan)	14	(3)
2026–	MSV Duisburg	11	(4)

International career
2020	Germany U21	3	(1)
- * Club domestic league appearances and goals as of 17:42, 7 November 2026 (UTC)

Dominik Kother (born 16 March 2000) is a German professional footballer who plays as a forward for 3. Liga club MSV Duisburg.

== Career ==
Kother made his professional debut for Karlsruher SC in the 2. Bundesliga on 14 December 2019, coming on as a substitute in the 89th minute for Marc Lorenz in the home match against Greuther Fürth, which finished as a 1–5 loss.

On 31 January 2022, Kother joined Waldhof Mannheim on loan.

In summer 2023, he joined Jahn Regensburg on a two-year contract.

On 6 January 2025, Kother moved from Jahn Regensburg to Dynamo Dresden.

On 2 February 2026, Kother was loaned from Dresden to MSV Duisburg in the 3. Liga until the end of the 2025–26 season. In May 2026, he was signed permanently by Duisburg.

== Career statistics ==
As of 7 November 2026

Appearances and goals by club, season and competition
Club	Season	League			Cup		Other		Total	
Club	Season	Division	Apps	Goals	Apps	Goals	Apps	Goals	Apps	Goals
Karlsruher SC	2019–20	2. Bundesliga	7	1	1	0	—		8	1
Karlsruher SC	2020–21	2. Bundesliga	23	3	1	0	—		24	3
Karlsruher SC	2021–22	2. Bundesliga	11	1	—		—		11	1
Karlsruher SC	Total		41	5	2	0	—		43	5
Waldhof Mannheim (loan)	2021–22	3. Liga	13	3	—		—		13	3
Waldhof Mannheim (loan)	2022–23	3. Liga	27	3	2	0	—		27	3
Waldhof Mannheim (loan)	Total		40	6	2	0	—		42	6
Jahn Regensburg	2023–24	3. Liga	37	10	1	1	2 (Note: Appearances in promotion playoffs)	0	40	11
Jahn Regensburg	2024–25	2. Bundesliga	14	1	2	0	0	0	16	1
Jahn Regensburg	Total		51	11	3	1	2	0	56	12
Dynamo Dresden	2024–25	3. Liga	18	6	0	0	—		18	6
Dynamo Dresden	2025–26	2. Bundesliga	12	1	1	0	—		13	1
Dynamo Dresden	Total		30	7	1	0	—		31	7
MSV Duisburg (loan)	2025–26	3. Liga	14	3	—		—		14	3
MSV Duisburg	2026–27	3. Liga	11	4	0	0	—		11	4
MSV Duisburg	Duisburg total		25	7	0	0	—		25	7
Career total			187	36	8	1	2	0	197	37
