= Marcel Benger =

German footballer (born 1998)

Personal information
- Date of birth: 2 July 1998 (age 28)
- Place of birth: Krefeld, Germany
- Height: 1.88 m (6 ft 2 in)
- Position: Defender

Team information
- Current team: Fortuna Düsseldorf
- Number: 16

Youth career
- 2002–2011: SC Bayer 05 Uerdingen
- 2011–2014: MSV Duisburg
- 2014–2017: Borussia Mönchengladbach

Senior career*
Years	Team	Apps	(Gls)
2017–2021	Borussia Mönchengladbach II	97	(12)
2017–2018	Borussia Mönchengladbach	1	(0)
2021–2023	Holstein Kiel	10	(0)
2021	Holstein Kiel II	14	(1)
2023–2025	SC Verl	63	(7)
2025–2026	Preußen Münster	15	(0)
2026–	Fortuna Düsseldorf	0	(0)
- * Club domestic league appearances and goals as of 18 May 2026

Marcel Benger (born 2 July 1998) is a German professional footballer who plays as a defender for 3. Liga club Fortuna Düsseldorf.

== Club career ==
On 18 June 2025, Benger signed with Preußen Münster in 2. Bundesliga.

On 23 July 2026, Benger joined Fortuna Düsseldorf on a one-season deal.
