= Morten Rüdiger =

German footballer

Personal information
- Date of birth: 13 June 1995 (age 31)
- Place of birth: Lübeck, Germany
- Height: 1.76 m (5 ft 9 in)
- Position: Midfielder

Team information
- Current team: Eintracht Norderstedt
- Number: 31

Youth career
- Eichholzer SV
- –2010: SV Eichede
- 2010–2014: VfB Lübeck

Senior career*
Years	Team	Apps	(Gls)
2014–2017	Eintracht Braunschweig II	50	(6)
2017–2020	Rot-Weiß Erfurt	59	(7)
2020–2024	VfB Lübeck	58	(2)
2025–	Eintracht Norderstedt	6	(0)
- * Club domestic league appearances and goals as of 10 May 2025

Morten Rüdiger (born 13 June 1995) is a German professional footballer who plays as a midfielder for Eintracht Norderstedt.
