= Filimon Gerezgiher =

German-Eritrean footballer (born 2000)

Personal information
- Date of birth: 4 July 2000 (age 26)
- Place of birth: Stuttgart, Germany
- Height: 1.93 m (6 ft 4 in)
- Position: Winger

Team information
- Current team: Fortuna Düsseldorf
- Number: 23

Youth career
- –2013: FC Stuttgart-Cannstatt
- 2012–2015: MTV Stuttgart
- 2015–2016: SGV Freiberg
- 2016–2019: SV Sandhausen

Senior career*
Years	Team	Apps	(Gls)
2019	SV Sandhausen II	1	(0)
2019–2020	Wormatia Worms	17	(6)
2020–2022	FSV 08 Bissingen	42	(11)
2022	VfB Stuttgart II	6	(0)
2023–2024	SGV Freiberg	42	(11)
2024–2026	SV Elversberg	19	(1)
2025–2026	→ FC Emmen (loan)	25	(2)
2026–	Fortuna Düsseldorf	0	(0)

International career^{‡}
2026–	Eritrea	2	(0)
- * Club domestic league appearances and goals as of 29 August 2026 ‡ National team caps and goals as of 30 September 2026

Filimon Gerezgiher (born 4 July 2000) is a professional footballer who plays as a winger for 3. Liga club Fortuna Düsseldorf. Born in Germany, he represents the Eritrea national team.

== Club career ==
As a youth player, Gerezgiher joined the youth academy of German side SV Sandhausen and was promoted to the club's reserve team in 2019, where he made one league appearance and scored zero goals. During the summer of 2019, he signed for German side Wormatia Worms, where he made seventeen league appearances and scored six goals.

Following his stint there, he signed for German side SGV Freiberg, where he made forty-two league appearances and scored eleven goals in 2023. German magazine Kicker wrote in 2024 that he "quickly established himself as a regular starter and is now a key player" while playing for the club. Ahead of the 2024–25 season, he signed for German side SV Elversberg. Subsequently, he was sent on loan to Dutch side FC Emmen in 2025, where he ade twenty-five league appearances and scored two goals.

== Style of play ==
Gerezgiher plays as a winger. Left-footed, he is known for his speed.

== Career statistics ==
=== Club ===
As of match played 17 May 2026

Appearances and goals by club, season and competition
Club	Season	League			National cup (Note: Includes DFB-Pokal, KNVB Cup)		Other		Total	
Club	Season	Division	Apps	Goals	Apps	Goals	Apps	Goals	Apps	Goals
SV Sandhausen II	2019–20	Verbandsliga Nordbaden	1	0	—		—		1	0
Wormatia Worms	2019–20	Oberliga Rheinland-Pfalz/Saar	17	6	—		3 (Note: Appearances in Southwestern Cup)	0	20	6
FSV 08 Bissingen	2020–21	Oberliga Baden-Württemberg	7	2	—		0	0	7	2
FSV 08 Bissingen	2021–22	Oberliga Baden-Württemberg	35	9	—		5 (Note: Appearances in Württemberg Cup)	0	40	9
FSV 08 Bissingen	Total		42	11	—		5	0	47	11
VfB Stuttgart II	2022–23	Regionalliga Südwest	6	0	—		—		6	0
SGV Freiberg	2022–23	Regionalliga Südwest	10	2	—		—		10	2
SGV Freiberg	2023–24	Regionalliga Südwest	32	9	—		3	2	35	11
SGV Freiberg	Total		42	11	—		3	2	45	13
SV Elversberg	2024–25	2. Bundesliga	19	1	2	0	—		21	1
FC Emmen (loan)	2025–26	Eerste Divisie	25	2	1	0	—		26	2
Career total			152	31	3	0	11	2	166	33

=== International ===
As of match played 30 September 2026

Appearances and goals by national team and year
National team	Year	Apps	Goals
Eritrea	2026	2	0
Total		2	0
