= Niclas Anspach =

German footballer (born 2000)

Personal information
- Date of birth: 22 July 2000 (age 26)
- Place of birth: Schkeuditz, Germany
- Height: 1.75 m (5 ft 9 in)
- Position: Midfielder

Team information
- Current team: FC 08 Homburg
- Number: 20

Youth career
- –2011: 1860 Rosenheim
- 2012–2013: TSV Bad Endorf
- 2013–2016: 1860 Rosenheim
- 2016–2019: SpVgg Unterhaching

Senior career*
Years	Team	Apps	(Gls)
2019–2023	SpVgg Unterhaching	67	(17)
2020–2021	→ 1860 Rosenheim (loan)	0	(0)
2023–2025	Jahn Regensburg	14	(0)
2024	Jahn Regensburg II	13	(6)
2025–	FC 08 Homburg	0	(0)
- * Club domestic league appearances and goals as of 17 January 2025

Niclas Anspach (born 22 July 2000) is a German professional footballer who plays as a midfielder for Regionalliga club FC 08 Homburg.

== Career ==
Anspach made his professional debut for SpVgg Unterhaching in the 3. Liga on 9 February 2019, coming on as a substitute in the 79th minute for Marc Endres in the 2–0 away loss against Hansa Rostock. In January 2020, Anspach joined Regionalliga Bayern side TSV 1860 Rosenheim on loan until the end of the season.

On 24 January 2025, Anspach left Jahn Regensburg by mutual consent.
