= Franz Pfanne =

German footballer (born 1994)

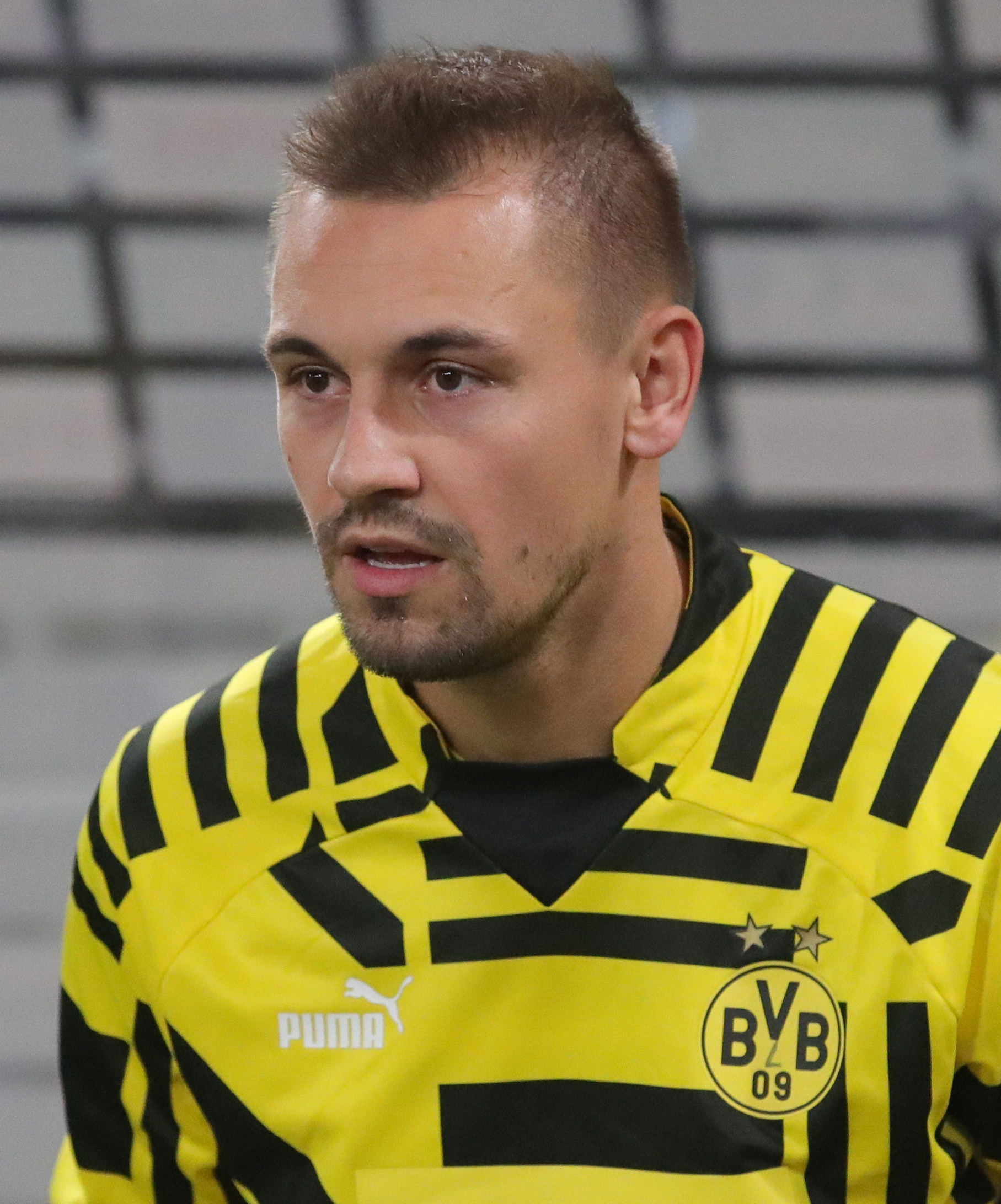
- Pfanne in 2022

Personal information
- Date of birth: 10 December 1994 (age 31)
- Place of birth: Bautzen, Germany
- Height: 1.86 m (6 ft 1 in)
- Position: Midfielder

Team information
- Current team: Hansa Rostock
- Number: 23

Youth career
- –2007: Budissa Bautzen
- 2007–2013: Dynamo Dresden

Senior career*
Years	Team	Apps	(Gls)
2013–2015	Dynamo Dresden II	44	(2)
2014–2015	Dynamo Dresden	1	(0)
2015–2018	Budissa Bautzen	79	(2)
2015	Budissa Bautzen II	1	(0)
2018–2020	SV Rödinghausen	54	(5)
2020–2024	Borussia Dortmund II	142	(8)
2024–	Hansa Rostock	59	(0)
- * Club domestic league appearances and goals as of 28 May 2026

Franz Pfanne (born 10 December 1994) is a German footballer who plays as a midfielder for 3. Liga club Hansa Rostock.

== Career ==
Pfanne made his professional debut for Dynamo Dresden in the 3. Liga on 24 September 2014, coming on as a substitute in the 89th minute for Sinan Tekerci in the 1–1 away draw against Hallescher FC.

On 14 June 2024, Pfanne signed with Hansa Rostock in 3. Liga.
