= Marco Hober =

German footballer

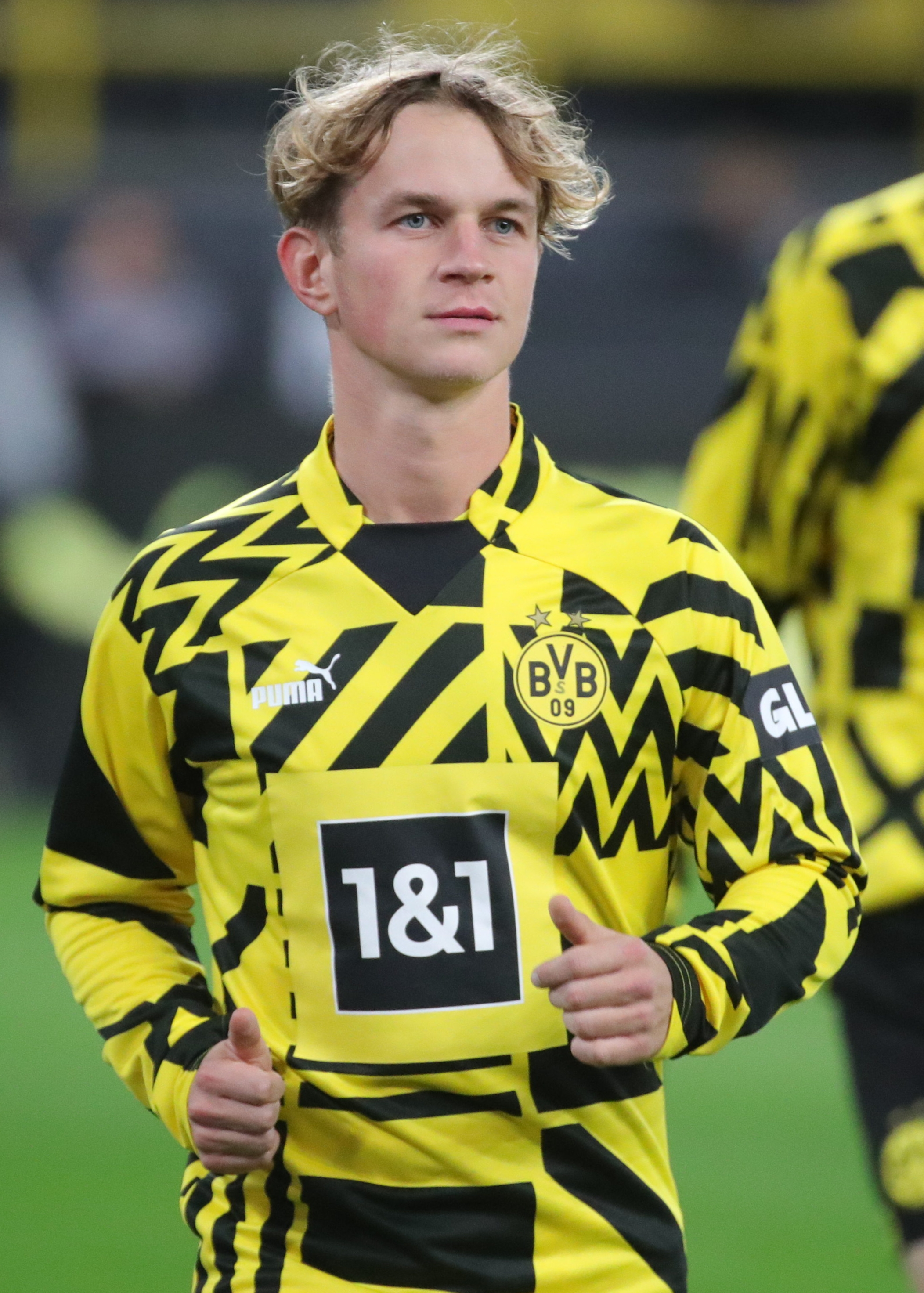
- Marco Hober (2022)

Personal information
- Date of birth: 9 September 1995 (age 31)
- Place of birth: Bielefeld, Germany
- Height: 1.73 m (5 ft 8 in)
- Position: Midfielder

Team information
- Current team: SV Rödinghausen
- Number: 33

Youth career
- SV Gadderbaum
- –2010: VfR Wellensiek
- 2010–2014: Arminia Bielefeld

Senior career*
Years	Team	Apps	(Gls)
2014–2015	Arminia Bielefeld II	29	(3)
2015–2017	Arminia Bielefeld	1	(0)
2016–2017	→ Borussia Dortmund II (loan)	49	(2)
2017–2018	Sportfreunde Lotte	17	(0)
2018–2023	Borussia Dortmund II	79	(1)
2023–	SV Rödinghausen	80	(1)
- * Club domestic league appearances and goals as of 24 June 2026

Marco Hober (born 9 September 1995) is a German footballer who plays as a midfielder for Regionalliga West side SV Rödinghausen.

== Club career ==
On 23 January 2023, Hober signed a 2.5-year contract with SV Rödinghausen.
