= Louis Breunig =

German footballer (born 2003)

Personal information
- Date of birth: 14 November 2003 (age 23)
- Place of birth: Würzburg, Germany
- Height: 1.84 m (6 ft 0 in)
- Position: Defender

Team information
- Current team: Würzburger Kickers (on loan from Eintracht Braunschweig)
- Number: 16

Youth career
- SV Theilheim
- –2015: Würzburger FV
- 2015–2018: Greuther Fürth
- 2018–2021: Würzburger Kickers

Senior career*
Years	Team	Apps	(Gls)
2021–2022	Würzburger Kickers	16	(1)
2022–2024	1. FC Nürnberg	1	(0)
2022–2023	1. FC Nürnberg II	20	(0)
2023–2024	→ Jahn Regensburg (loan)	35	(0)
2024–2025	Jahn Regensburg	26	(0)
2025–	Eintracht Braunschweig	10	(0)
2026–	→ Würzburger Kickers (loan)	0	(0)

International career^{‡}
2024	Germany U20	2	(0)
- * Club domestic league appearances and goals as of 1 September 2026 ‡ National team caps and goals as of 25 March 2024

Louis Breunig (born 14 November 2003) is a German professional footballer who plays as a defender for 3. Liga club Würzburger Kickers, on loan from Eintracht Braunschweig.

== Career ==
After playing youth football with SV Theilheim, Würzburger FV, Greuther Fürth and Würzburger Kickers, Breunig signed a professional contract with Würzburg in April 2021. He made his debut on 29 August 2021, starting in a 1–1 draw with 1. FC Saarbrücken.

On 12 June 2022, Breunig joined 1. FC Nürnberg. On 27 June 2023, Breunig was loaned by Jahn Regensburg.

On 19 June 2024, Regensburg made the transfer permanent and signed a three-year contract with Breunig.

On 11 July 2025, Breunig moved to Eintracht Braunschweig on a three-season deal.

== Personal life ==
He is the younger brother of SC Freiburg II player Maximilian Breunig.

== Career statistics ==
As of match played on 14 March 2025

Appearances and goals by club, season and competition
Club	Season	League			National cup		Other		Total	
Club	Season	Division	Apps	Goals	Apps	Goals	Apps	Goals	Apps	Goals
Würzburger Kickers	2021–22	3. Liga	16	1	0	0	4 (Note: Appearances in the Bavarian Cup)	0	20	1
1. FC Nürnberg	2022–23	2. Bundesliga	1	0	0	0	—		1	0
1. FC Nürnberg II	2022–23	Regionalliga Bayern	20	0	—		—		20	0
Jahn Regensburg (loan)	2023–24	3. Liga	35	0	1	0	3	0	36	0
Jahn Regensburg	2024–25	2. Bundesliga	24	0	3	0	0	0	27	0
Career total			96	1	4	0	7	0	107	1
