= Andreas Müller (footballer, born 2000) =

German footballer

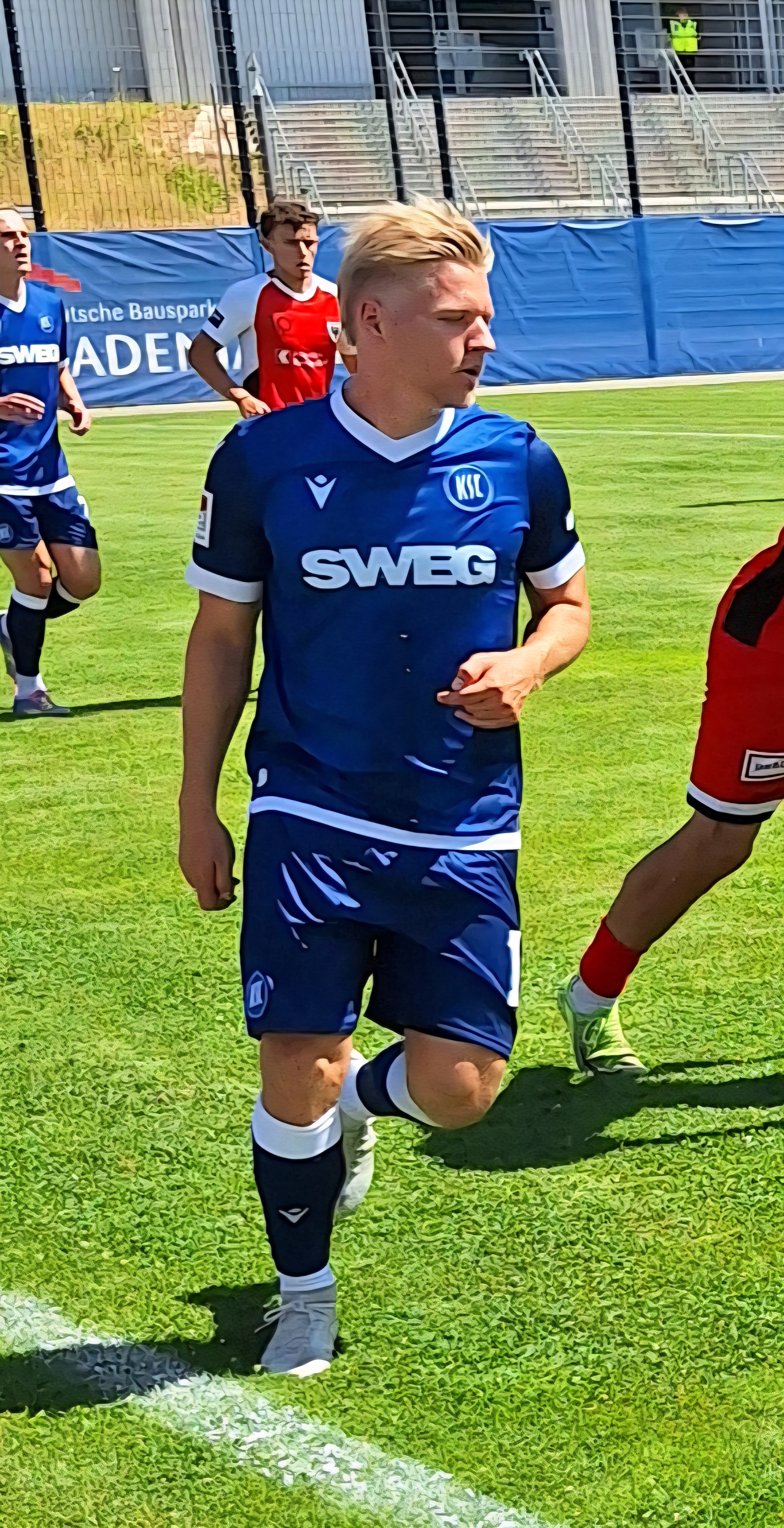
- Müller with Karlsruher SC in 2025

Personal information
- Date of birth: 20 July 2000 (age 26)
- Place of birth: Sinsheim, Germany
- Height: 1.73 m (5 ft 8 in)
- Position: Defensive midfielder

Team information
- Current team: Fortuna Düsseldorf (on loan from Karlsruher SC)
- Number: 6

Youth career
- –2017: TSG Hoffenheim
- 2017–2019: Astoria Walldorf

Senior career*
Years	Team	Apps	(Gls)
2019	Astoria Walldorf II	6	(0)
2019–2020	Astoria Walldorf	4	(0)
2020–2023	1. FC Magdeburg	88	(8)
2023–2025	Darmstadt 98	43	(2)
2025–	Karlsruher SC	23	(0)
2026–	→ Fortuna Düsseldorf (loan)	0	(0)
- * Club domestic league appearances and goals as of 18 May 2026

Andreas Müller (born 20 July 2000) is a German professional footballer who plays as a defensive midfielder for 3. Liga club Fortuna Düsseldorf, on loan from Karlsruher SC.

== Career ==
Müller made his professional debut for 1. FC Magdeburg in the first round of the 2020–21 DFB-Pokal on 13 September 2020, coming on as a substitute in the 86th minute against 2. Bundesliga side Darmstadt 98, with the home match finishing as a 3–2 loss after extra time.

On 21 June 2025, Müller signed with Karlsruher SC.
