= Eric Hottmann =

German footballer (born 2000)

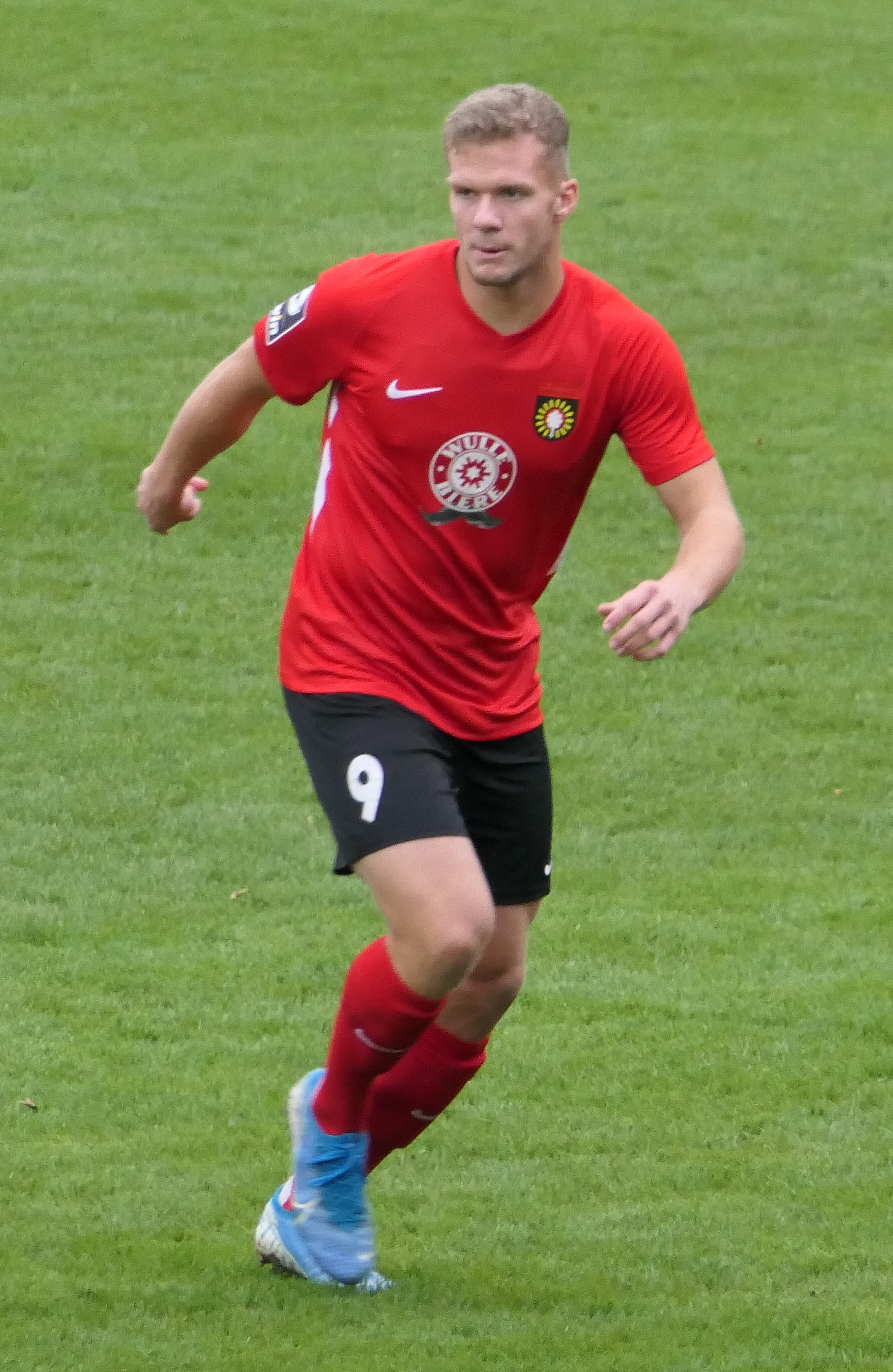
- Hottmann with Sonnenhof Großaspach in 2019

Personal information
- Date of birth: 8 February 2000 (age 26)
- Place of birth: Aalen, Germany
- Height: 1.87 m (6 ft 2 in)
- Position: Forward

Team information
- Current team: Fortuna Düsseldorf
- Number: 9

Youth career
- –2012: TSG Hofherrnweiler-Unterrombach
- 2012–2019: VfB Stuttgart

Senior career*
Years	Team	Apps	(Gls)
2018–2021	VfB Stuttgart II	26	(4)
2019–2020	→ Sonnenhof Großaspach (loan)	23	(0)
2021–2022	Türkgücü München	29	(2)
2022–2023	Energie Cottbus	32	(10)
2023–2026	Jahn Regensburg	72	(13)
2026–	Fortuna Düsseldorf	0	(0)

International career
2015–2016	Germany U16	5	(2)
2016–2017	Germany U17	6	(1)
2017–2018	Germany U18	6	(3)
2018–2019	Germany U19	6	(2)
- * Club domestic league appearances and goals as of 19:36, 18 May 2026 (UTC)

Eric Hottmann (born 8 February 2000) is a German professional footballer who plays as a forward for 3. Liga club Fortuna Düsseldorf.

== Career ==
Hottmann made his professional debut for Sonnenhof Großaspach in the 3. Liga on 20 July 2019, coming on as a substitute in the 75th minute for Dan-Patrick Poggenberg in a 4–1 away loss against MSV Duisburg.

On 9 August 2023, Hottmann joined 3. Liga club Jahn Regensburg on a two-year contract.
