= Jahnstadion Regensburg =

Football stadium in Regensburg, Germany

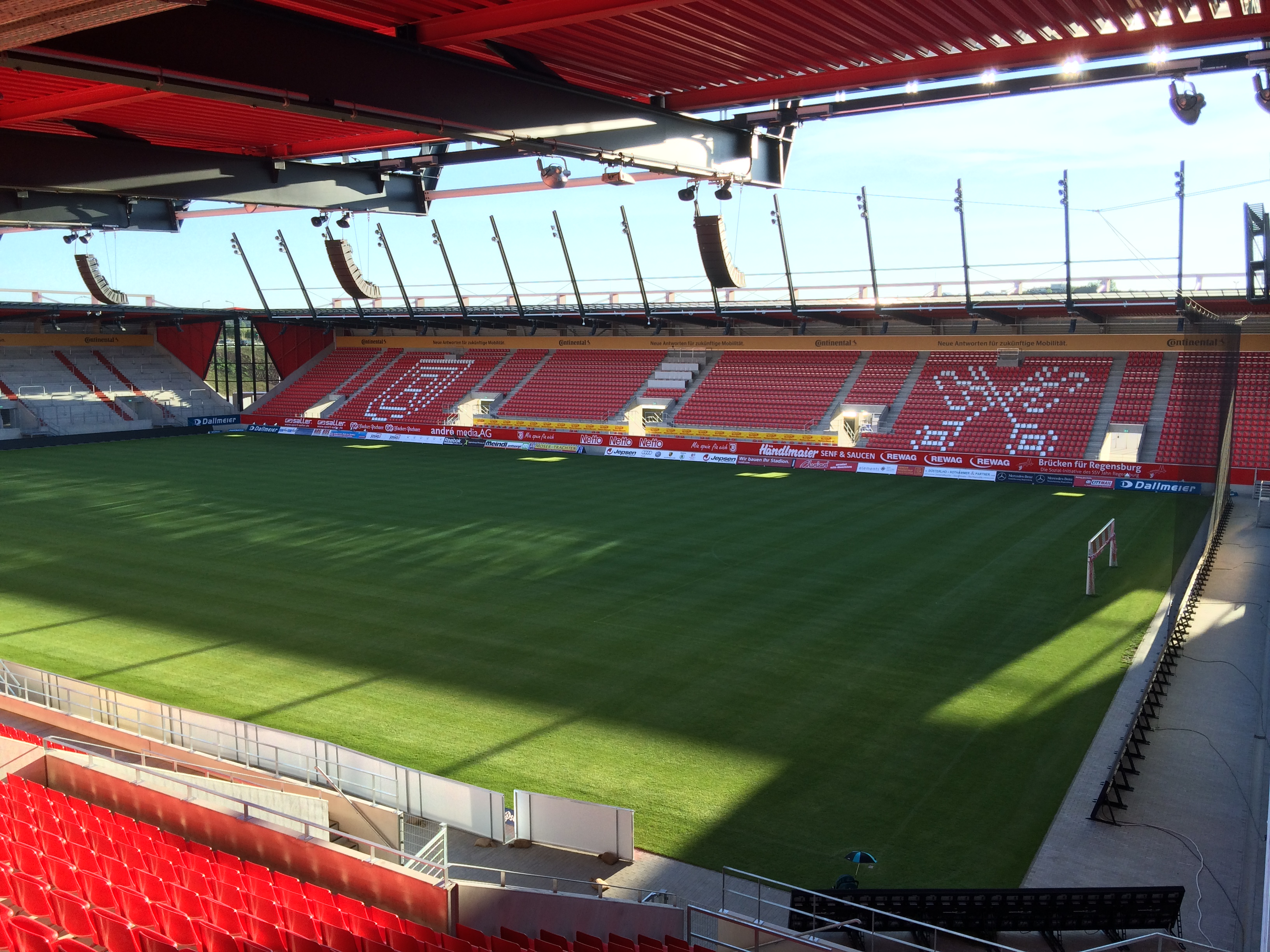
- Interactive map of Jahnstadion Regensburg
- Former names: Continental Arena (2015–19), Jahnstadion (2020–present)
- Location: Regensburg, Germany
- Coordinates: 48°59′27″N 12°06′26″E
- Owner: City of Regensburg
- Capacity: 15,210
- Surface: Grass
- Record attendance: 15,224

Construction
- Groundbreaking: 7 January 2014
- Opened: 18 July 2015
- Cost: €52.7 million
- Architect: Dr. Stefan Nixdorf

Tenant
- Jahn Regensburg (2015–present)

Jahnstadion Regensburg is a football stadium in Regensburg, Germany. It is the home of Jahn Regensburg, replacing the old Jahnstadion.

== See also ==
- List of football stadiums in Germany
- Lists of stadiums
