= 2022–23 Borussia Dortmund II season =

Borussia Dortmund II
2022–23 season
- Manager: Christian Preußer (until 6 February 2023); Jan Zimmermann (since 8 February 2023)
- Stadium: Stadion Rote Erde
- 3. Liga: 13th
- Top goalscorer: Justin Njinmah (12 goals)
- Highest home attendance: 11,079 v Rot-Weiss Essen
- Lowest home attendance: 502 v SC Verl
Home colours	Away colours	Third colours

The 2022–23 Borussia Dortmund II season was the club's second consecutive season back in the 3. Liga since their relegation in the 2014–15 season.

== Competitions ==
=== Friendlies ===
6 July 2022	SV Wacker	1–2	Borussia Dortmund II	Burghausen
	Bachschmid 8'	Report	Elongo-Yombo; Walz	Stadium: Wacker-Arena

16 July 2022	Borussia Dortmund II	1–1	(Netherlands) RKC Waalwijk	Brackel, Dortmund
14:30	Pohlmann 38'	Report	unknown 59'	Stadium: Trainingsgelände

=== 3. Liga ===
==== Table ====
Pos	Team	Pld	W	D	L	GF	GA	GD	Pts
11	FC Ingolstadt	38	14	5	19	54	56	−2	47
12	MSV Duisburg	38	11	13	14	54	58	−4	46
13	Borussia Dortmund II (Note: Reserve teams are ineligible for promotion or DFB-Pokal qualification.)	38	13	6	19	47	49	−2	45
14	Erzgebirge Aue	38	12	9	17	49	62	−13	45
15	Rot-Weiss Essen	38	9	15	14	43	56	−13	42

Source: DFB
Rules for classification: 1) Points; 2) Goal difference; 3) Goals scored; 4) Head-to-head results; 5) Head-to-head away goals scored; 6) Away goals scored; 7) Play-off.

==== Results summary ====
Overall								Home						Away					
Pld	W	D	L	GF	GA	GD	Pts	W	D	L	GF	GA	GD	W	D	L	GF	GA	GD
38	13	6	19	47	49	−2	45	8	2	9	21	20	+1	5	4	10	26	29	−3

Source: DFB

==== Matches ====
25 July 2022 1	Wehen Wiesbaden	1–1	Borussia Dortmund II	Wiesbaden
19:00	Nilsson 56'	Report	Elongo-Yombo 77'	Stadium: Brita-Arena; Attendance: 2,869; Referee: Mitja Stegemann

7 August 2022 2	Borussia Dortmund II	0–4	FC Ingolstadt	Dortmund
13:00		Report	Schmidt 32'; Testroet 45' (pen.); Röhl 55'; Sarpei 66'	Stadium: Westfalenstadion; Attendance: 2,018; Referee: Tom Bauer

10 August 2022 3	1. FC Saarbrücken	1–0	Borussia Dortmund II	Saarbrücken
19:00	Grimaldi 90+3'	Report		Stadium: Ludwigsparkstadion; Attendance: 11,425; Referee: Marc Philip Eckermann

13 August 2022 4	Borussia Dortmund II	1–0	Rot-Weiss Essen	Dortmund
14:00	Fink 22'	Report		Stadium: Westfalenstadion; Attendance: 11,079; Referee: Patrick Hanslbauer

20 August 2022 5	Waldhof Mannheim	2–1	Borussia Dortmund II	Mannheim
14:00	Bahn 63', 71'	Report	Njinmah 2'	Stadium: Carl-Benz-Stadion; Attendance: 7,987; Referee: Lukas Benen

28 August 2022 6	Borussia Dortmund II	0–2	SC Freiburg II	Dortmund
13:01		Report	Vermeij 41', 61'	Stadium: Westfalenstadion; Attendance: 2,800; Referee: Martin Petersen

3 September 2022 7	Dynamo Dresden	3–0	Borussia Dortmund II	Dresden
14:00	Ehlers 9'; Arslan 66' (pen.); Kammerknecht 89'	Report		Stadium: Rudolf-Harbig-Stadion; Attendance: 20,731; Referee: Tobias Schultes

10 September 2022 8	Borussia Dortmund II	1–2	VfB Oldenburg	Dortmund
14:00	Pašalić 52'	Report	Atarke 30'; Ziętarski 89'	Stadium: Westfalenstadion; Attendance: 2,256; Referee: Jonas Brombacher

17 September 2022 9	FSV Zwickau	1–2	Borussia Dortmund II	Zwickau
14:00	Jansen 9'	Report	Njinmah 59' (pen.); Tattermusch 86'	Stadium: GGZ Arena; Attendance: 4,037; Referee: Assad Nouhoum

1 October 2022 10	Borussia Dortmund II	1–1	TSV 1860 Munich	Dortmund
14:00	Pašalić 68'	Report	Vrenezi 62' (pen.)	Stadium: Westfalenstadion; Attendance: 4,056; Referee: Patrick Schwengers

10 October 2022 11	Hallescher FC	0–0	Borussia Dortmund II	Halle
19:00		Report		Stadium: Leuna Chemie Stadion; Attendance: 6,712; Referee: Martin Speckner

16 October 2022 12	Borussia Dortmund II	2–0	MSV Duisburg	Wuppertal
14:00	Broschinski 38'; Pašalić 67'	Report		Stadium: Stadion am Zoo; Attendance: 2,542; Referee: Felix Bichel

22 October 2022 13	SV Meppen	0–2	Borussia Dortmund II	Meppen
14:00		Report	Bornemann 54'; Broschinski 90+1'	Stadium: Hänsch-Arena; Attendance: 7,252; Referee: Luca Jürgensen

29 October 2022 14	Borussia Dortmund II	1–0	SC Verl	Wuppertal
14:00	Broschinski 46'	Report		Stadium: Stadion am Zoo; Attendance: 502; Referee: Mario Hildenbrand

5 November 2022 15	SV Elversberg	3–1	Borussia Dortmund II	Spiesen-Elversberg
14:00	Feil 12'; Koffi 20'; Rochelt 69'	Report	Pohlmann 32'	Stadium: Ursapharm-Arena; Attendance: 6,087; Referee: Martin Thomsen

8 November 2022 16	Borussia Dortmund II	0–2	FC Viktoria Köln	Wuppertal
19:00		Report	Stehle 84'; Dams 87' (o.g.)	Stadium: Stadion am Zoo; Attendance: 514; Referee: Patrick Hanslbauer

11 November 2022 17	Borussia Dortmund II	0–1	Erzgebirge Aue	Dortmund
19:00		Report	Schikora 46'	Stadium: Rote Erde; Attendance: 1,306; Referee: Assad Nouhoum

15 January 2023 18	SpVgg Bayreuth	3–1	Borussia Dortmund II	Bayreuth
14:00	Ziereis 50'; George 55'; Maderer 90+5'	Report	Michel 8'	Stadium: Hans-Walter-Wild-Stadion; Attendance: 5,081; Referee: Martin Petersen

24 January 2023 19	Borussia Dortmund II	1–2	VfL Osnabrück	Dortmund
19:00	Gürpüz 2'	Report	Engelhardt 21'; Simakala 34' (pen.)	Stadium: Westfalenstadion; Attendance: 4,147; Referee: Eric Weisbach

29 January 2023 20	Borussia Dortmund II	0–1	Wehen Wiesbaden	Dortmund
14:00		Report	Hollerbach 49'	Stadium: Westfalenstadion; Attendance: 1,268; Referee: Nico Fuchs

4 February 2023 21	FC Ingolstadt	1–2	Borussia Dortmund II	Ingolstadt
14:00	Testroet 53'	Report	Dams 40'; Njinmah 42'	Stadium: Audi Sportpark; Attendance: 3,767; Referee: Richard Hempel

11 February 2023 22	Borussia Dortmund II	1–2	1. FC Saarbrücken	Dortmund
14:00	Dams 13'	Report	Kerber 45+2'; Neudecker 85'	Stadium: Westfalenstadion; Attendance: 1,488; Referee: Luca Jürgensen

19 February 2023 23	Rot-Weiss Essen	2–0	Borussia Dortmund II	Essen
14:00	Eisfeld 50'; Rother 85'	Report		Stadium: Stadion an der Hafenstraße; Attendance: 16,267; Referee: Lukas Benen

25 February 2023 24	Borussia Dortmund II	4–0	Waldhof Mannheim	Oberhausen
14:00	Njinmah 18', 65'; Pfanne 22'; Pašalić 90+4'	Report		Stadium: Niederrheinstadion; Attendance: 1,247; Referee: Robert Kampka

3 March 2023 25	SC Freiburg II	1–0	Borussia Dortmund II	Freiburg im Breisgau
19:00	Engelhardt 66'	Report		Stadium: Dreisamstadion; Attendance: 2,573; Referee: Marc Philip Eckermann

12 March 2023 26	Borussia Dortmund II	1–3	Dynamo Dresden	Dortmund
15:00	Njinmah 53'	Report	Kutschke 6', 17' (pen.); Lemmer 9'	Stadium: Westfalenstadion; Attendance: 13,550; Referee: Steven Greif

15 March 2023 27	VfB Oldenburg	2–1	Borussia Dortmund II	Oldenburg
19:00	Schäfer 8'; Adetula 88'	Report	Michel 17'	Stadium: Marschweg-Stadion; Attendance: 1,268; Referee: Martin Thomsen

19 March 2023 28	Borussia Dortmund II	4–0	FSV Zwickau	Oberhausen
14:00	Tattermusch 16'; Njinmah 25', 90+1'; Otuali 75'	Report		Stadium: Niederrheinstadion; Attendance: 709; Referee: Max Burda

26 March 2023 29	TSV 1860 Munich	1–4	Borussia Dortmund II	Munich
13:00	Holzhauser 85' (pen.)	Report	Pohlmann 5', 15'; Pudel 17'; Kamara 79'	Stadium: Grünwalder Stadion; Attendance: 15,000; Referee: Nico Fuchs

1 April 2023 30	Borussia Dortmund II	0–0	Hallescher FC	Dortmund
14:00		Report		Stadium: Stadion Rote Erde; Attendance: 1,289; Referee: Nicolas Winter

8 April 2023 31	MSV Duisburg	0–5	Borussia Dortmund II	Duisburg
14:00		Report	Papadopoulos 25'; Njinmah 57'; Eberwein 66'; Senger 70' (o.g.); Pfanne 75'	Stadium: MSV-Arena; Attendance: 11,073; Referee: Jonas Brombacher

15 April 2023 32	Borussia Dortmund II	1–0	SV Meppen	Dortmund
14:00	Njinmah 57'	Report		Stadium: Stadion Rote Erde; Attendance: 1,500; Referee: Tom Bauer

24 April 2023 33	SC Verl	2–1	Borussia Dortmund II	Paderborn
19:00	Otto 23'; Wolfram 45'	Report	Bueno 51'	Stadium: Home Deluxe Arena; Referee: Richard Hempel

29 April 2023 34	Borussia Dortmund II	2–0	SV Elversberg	Dortmund
14:00	Njinmah 36'; Michel 61'	Report		Stadium: Stadion Rote Erde; Attendance: 2,392; Referee: Eric Weisbach

7 May 2023 35	FC Viktoria Köln	1–1	Borussia Dortmund II	Cologne
14:00	Wunderlich 71'	Report	Özkan 29'	Stadium: Sportpark Höhenberg; Attendance: 3,712; Referee: Jonas Brombacher

15 May 2023 36	Erzgebirge Aue	3–3	Borussia Dortmund II	Aue
19:00	Besong 26', 85'; Taschtschi 62'	Report	Eberwein 39'; Schreck 47' (o.g.); Njinmah 74'	Stadium: Erzgebirgsstadion; Attendance: 7,203; Referee: Assad Nouhoum

20 May 2023 37	Borussia Dortmund II	1–0	SpVgg Bayreuth	Dortmund
14:00	Michel 56'	Report		Stadium: Stadion Rote Erde; Attendance: 2,720; Referee: Franziska Wildfeuer

27 May 2023 38	VfL Osnabrück	2–1	Borussia Dortmund II	Osnabrück
13:30	Simakala 90+4'; Wulff 90+6'	Report	Njinmah 48'	Stadium: Bremer Brücke; Attendance: 15,741; Referee: Robin Braun
