= Thomas Meunier =

Belgian footballer (born 1991)

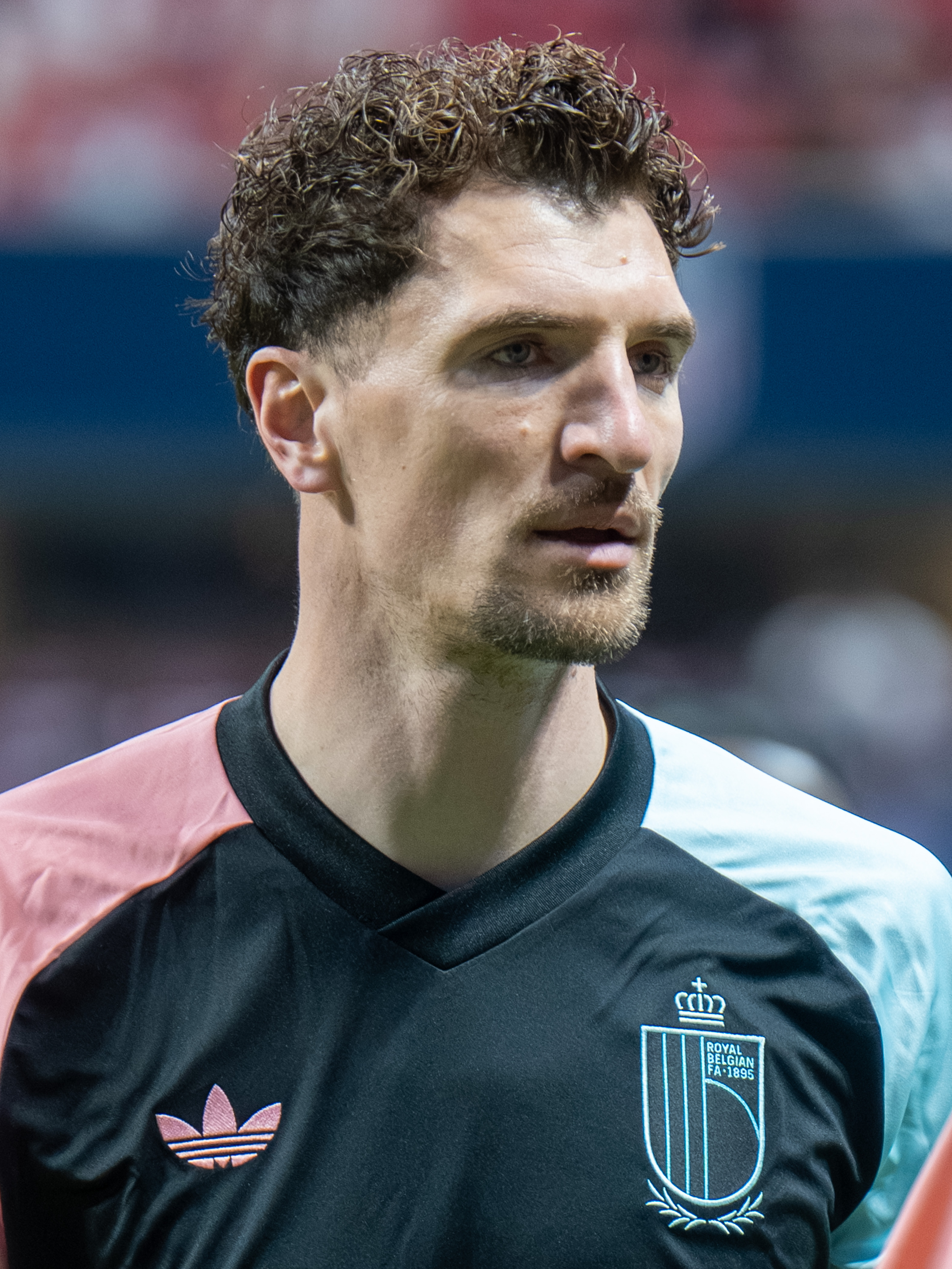
- Meunier with Belgium in 2026

Personal information
- Full name: Thomas André A. Meunier
- Date of birth: 12 September 1991 (age 35)
- Place of birth: Sainte-Ode, Belgium
- Height: 1.91 m (6 ft 3 in)
- Position: Right-back

Team information
- Current team: Sunderland
- Number: 12

Youth career
- 1996–2002: RUS Saint-Ode
- 2002–2004: RUS Givry
- 2004–2006: Standard Liège
- 2006–2009: Virton

Senior career*
Years	Team	Apps	(Gls)
2009–2011	Virton	49	(15)
2011–2016	Club Brugge	149	(15)
2016–2020	Paris Saint-Germain	84	(8)
2020–2024	Borussia Dortmund	56	(3)
2023	Borussia Dortmund II	3	(0)
2024	Trabzonspor	14	(1)
2024–2026	Lille	55	(3)
2026–	Sunderland	8	(0)

International career^{‡}
2006	Belgium U15	1	(0)
2011–2012	Belgium U21	7	(1)
2013–	Belgium	83	(10)
Medal record
Men's football
Representing Belgium
FIFA World Cup
Third place	2018 Russia
- * Club domestic league appearances and goals as of 8 November 2026 (UTC) ‡ National team caps and goals as of 2 July 2026 (UTC)

Thomas André A. Meunier (French pronunciation: [tɔma mønje]; born 12 September 1991) is a Belgian professional footballer who plays as a right-back for Premier League club Sunderland and the Belgium national team.

Meunier began his professional career at Virton before joining Club Brugge in 2011, where he was converted from a winger into a right-back and won the Belgian Cup and the Belgian First Division A title. In 2016, he signed for Paris Saint-Germain, where he won three Ligue 1 titles, two Coupe de France trophies, three Coupe de la Ligue titles and three Trophée des Champions before joining Borussia Dortmund in 2020. He later played for Trabzonspor and Lille before signing for Sunderland in 2026. At international level, Meunier represented Belgium at three FIFA World Cups (2018, 2022 and 2026) and three UEFA European Championships (2016, 2020 and 2024), helping the team finish third at the 2018 World Cup.

== Club career ==
=== Virton ===
Born in Born in Sainte-Ode, Belgium, Meunier began playing for various youth teams, starting with RUS Saint-Ode, RUS Givry and Standard Liège. He spent two seasons with Liège before being released due to injuries. Meunier revealed that his release affected him and at one point he considered quitting football before being persuaded by his mother to continue. During a trial at Virton, Meunier impressed the club's management and was subsequently signed by the club.

Meunier started to play professionally for Virton's first team in the first half of 2009, making his debut for the club in a 1–1 draw against K.F.C. V.W. Hamme on 31 January 2009. He went on to make five appearances, as Virton were relegated from the Second Division.

After becoming a first team regular in the 2009–10 season, making 16 appearances and scoring 5 times in all competitions, the 2010–11 season proved to be his breakthrough. His first goal of the 2010–11 season came on 22 August 2010 when he scored in a 3–0 win over C.S. Visé. He then scored twice on 2 October 2010, in a 4–0 win over RFC Liège, followed up by scoring another brace seven days later on 9 October 2010, in a 2–1 win over Sporting Hasselt. He then scored two goals in two matches between 30 January 2011 and 6 February 2011 against R. Charleroi Couillet Fleurus and KSKL Ternat. Throughout the 2010–11 season, Meunier quickly made an impression for the side, as he made 29 appearances and scoring 11 times in all competitions. From 2009 to 2011, Meunier made 52 appearances and scored 15 goals in all competitions for Virton's first team.

=== Club Brugge ===
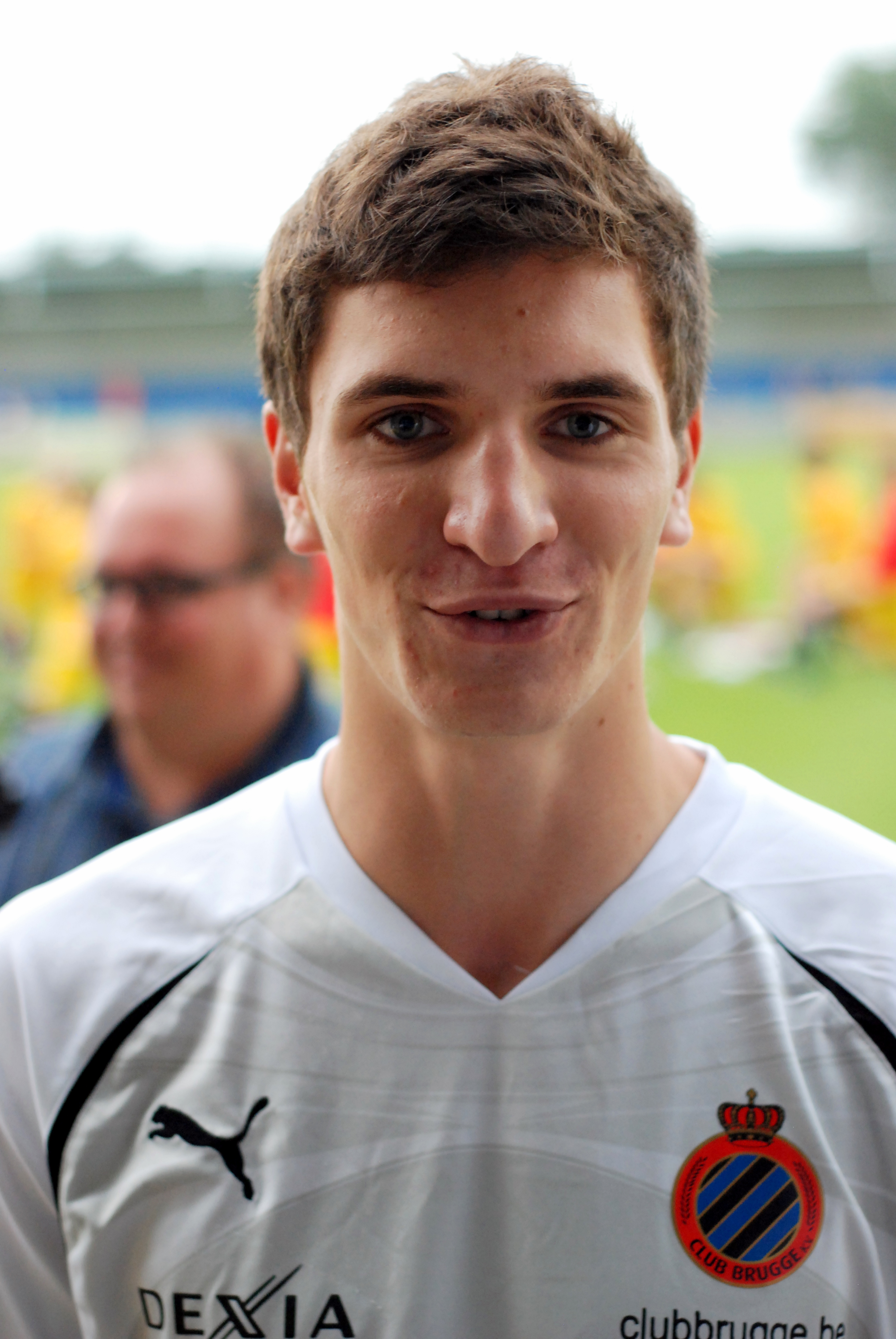
Meunier in his early Club Brugge career, in 2011

Meunier was signed by Club Brugge in January 2011 for a transfer fee of 200,000 euros, with the actual transfer to be completed during the 2011 summer transfer window. A few days earlier, Club Brugge had just missed out on the transfers of Dalibor Veselinović and Jelle Van Damme and therefore wanted to make sure Meunier would not become the third near miss. Club Brugge managed to complete the deal before any of the several other interested Belgian clubs (Anderlecht, Standard Liège, Sint-Truiden and Zulte Waregem) could.

Ahead of the new season, Meunier was given the number 19 shirt. On 31 July 2011, Club Brugge played its first match of the 2011–12 season against Westerlo in which Meunier was allowed to play the final 20 minutes. Meunier played a decent match, getting on the score sheet in the process. It wasn't until on 21 September 2011 when he scored again, in a 3–2 win over Dessel Sport. He then scored three goals in five appearances in all competitions between 16 October 2011 and 3 November 2011 against Gent, Genk and Birmingham City. Since making his debut for Club Brugge, Meunier established himself in the first team, playing in the midfield position. As a result, he signed a contract extension, to keep him at the club until 2016. Despite injuries, Meunier finished his first season at Club Brugge, making 49 appearances and scoring 5 times in all competitions. At the end of the 2011–12 season, Meunier's goal against Genk earned him third place for Goal of the Season.

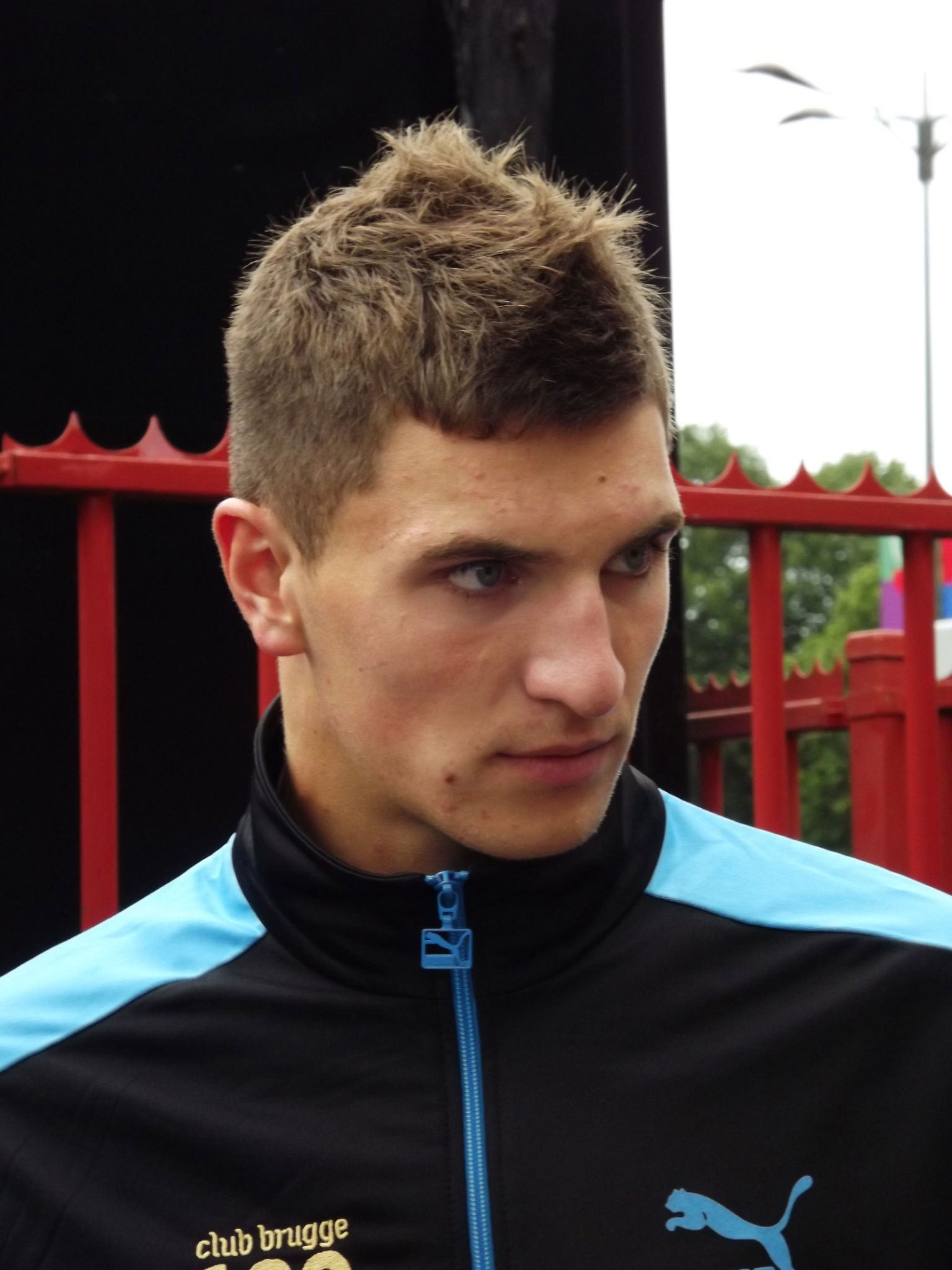
Meunier in 2012

At the start of the 2012–13 season, Meunier started the season well when he scored in the first four league matches against Waasland-Beveren, Charleroi, KV Mechelen and Beerschot. After the match, Meunier talked about scoring regularly, saying "Last season I scored three times. My ambition was to do better. But this is very close." He started out playing in the right–wing position. However, Meunier suffered injuries on two occasions that kept him out until November. He didn't return until 17 November 2012, coming on as a second–half substitute, in a 6–2 win over Waasland-Beveren. After returning, Meunier began playing in the right–back position, which he said was no problem. Around late–January, he suffered an injury once again and was sidelined until March. After returning to the first from injury, Meunier regained his first team place, where he played in the right–back position for the rest of the season. At the end of the 2012–13 season, Meunier went on to make 28 appearances and scoring 4 times in all competitions.

At the start of the 2013–14 season, Meunier was sidelined until September, after an operation on a groin injury. Since returning from injury, Meunier quickly returned to the first team, regaining his right–back position and helped the side keep a clean sheet four times between 14 September 2013 and 5 October 2013. His performance attracted attention from Bundesliga side Wolfsburg but stayed at the club throughout the January transfer window. It wasn't until on 18 February 2014 when he scored his first goal for the club, in a 5–2 win over OH Leuven. He then scored twice on 16 March 2014, in a 2–0 win over Cercle Brugge. In a 1–0 loss against Anderlecht on 4 May 2014, Meunier scored an own goal, which saw them lose and costing the club their title chances. Despite being sidelined later in the 2013–14 season, Meunier made 33 appearances and scored three times in all competitions. He also received a Blue Shoe two months later.

In the 2014–15 season, Meunier started the season well when he set up one of the goals, in a 2–0 win over Waasland-Beveren. From the start of the season, Meunier appeared in every match in the right–back position until he suffered an injury in early–December. On 22 November 2014, Meunier scored his first goal of the season, in a 4–2 win over Waasland-Beveren. After returning from injury, he scored again on 14 December 2014, in a 3–1 win over Standard Liège. In January 2015, Meunier signed a new contract with the club, keeping him until 2019. Shortly after, on 20 January 2015, he produced a hat–trick of assists, in a 3–2 win over KV Mechelen to send them through to the semi final of Beker van België. Meunier suffered two injuries towards the end of the season. Nevertheless, he played every minute of the 2015 Belgian Cup Final against rivals RSC Anderlecht, which ended in a 2–1 win for Club Brugge which enabled the club to win its first Belgian Cup since 2007. At the end of the 2014–15 season, Meunier made 46 appearances and scored two times in all competitions. For his performance, Meunier was awarded Footballer of the Year.

Ahead of the 2015–16 season, Meunier was linked with a move away from Club Brugge and was expected to leave the club in the summer. However, he suffered a knee injury whilst on international duty and was out for two months. It wasn't until on 30 August 2015 when he returned to the first team from injury, coming on as a late substitute, in a 7–1 win over Standard Liège. He then scored his first goal of the season on 23 September 2015, as well as, setting up a goal, in a 4–0 win over Patro Eisden. A week later, on 1 October 2015, Meunier scored again in a UEFA Europa League match, in a 3–1 loss against Midtjylland. Then, on 5 November 2015, he scored in the UEFA Europa League campaign once again, in a 1–0 win over Legia Warsaw. He captained Club Brugge for the first time when he led a 4–1 win over KV Mechelen on 30 November 2015. He then set up two goals in a 6–0 win over Westerlo, followed up by scoring again, in a 3–2 loss against Genk. He went on to score two more goals against Genk and Gent towards the end of the season and helped the club win the league. Despite being sidelined on two occasions later in the 2015–16 season, Meunier went on to make 42 appearances and scored six times.

Over the 2016 summer transfer window, Meunier was a transfer target for several clubs, with Paris Saint-Germain leading the chase to sign him. But in early June, he made it clear that he was going to stay at the club. Despite his claim that he intended to stay at Club Brugge, he continued to be a transfer target.

When Meunier joined Club Brugge in 2011, he initially played as a striker or right winger before he was transformed into a right back by head coaches Juan Carlos Garrido, Georges Leekens and Michel Preud'homme due to the lack of players playing in that position because of injuries sustained by his teammates Davy De Fauw and Tom Høgli, and the departure of Carl Hoefkens.

=== Paris Saint-Germain ===
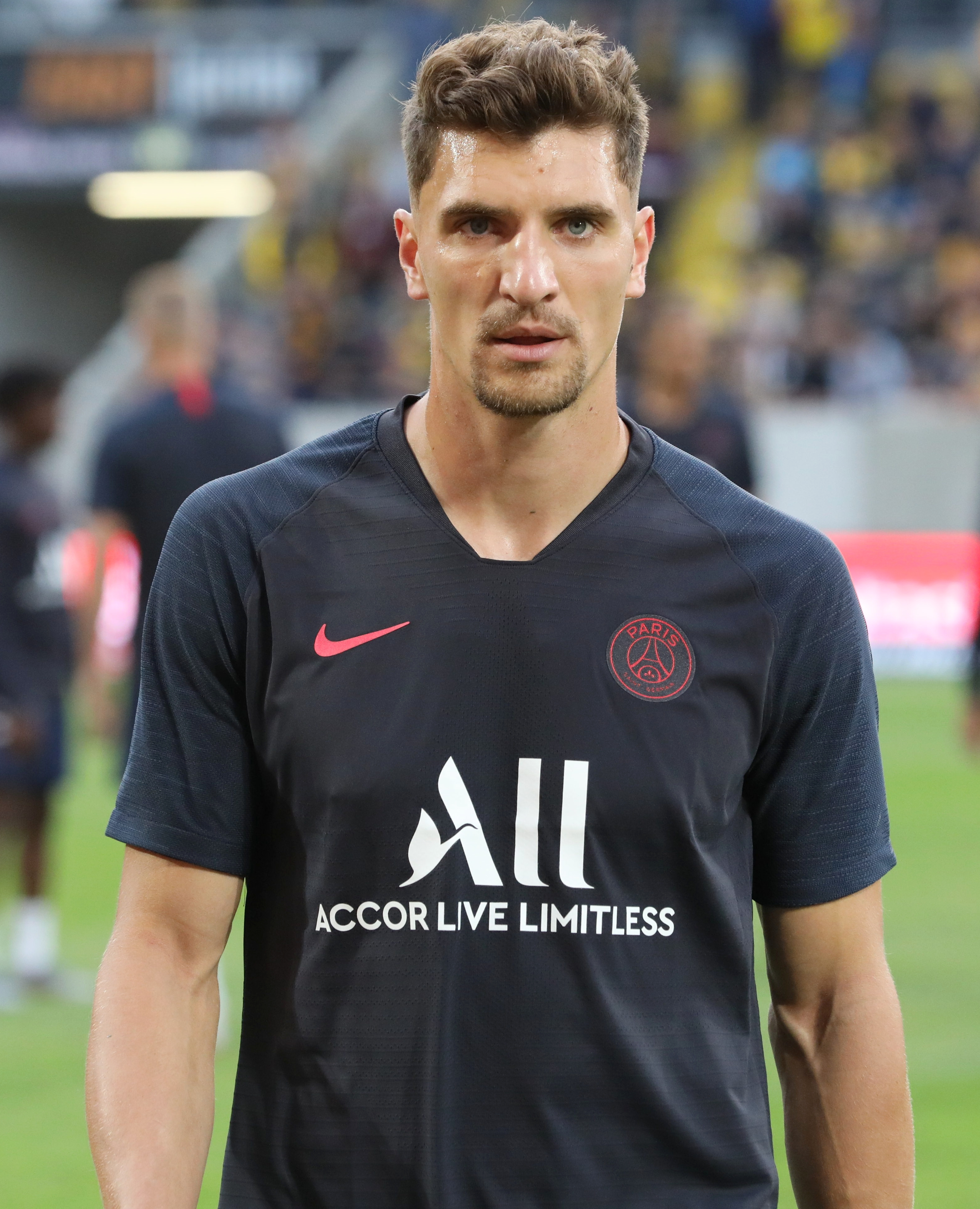
Meuiner with Paris Saint-Germain in 2019

On 3 July 2016, Paris Saint-Germain announced that Meunier had just joined PSG on a four-year deal that would tie him to the club until 30 June 2020. The transfer fee was reported to be 7 million euros. Prior to the move, Meunier admitted to having doubts about moving to PSG, citing a possible lack of playing time there.

In the 2016 International Champions Cup friendly match against Real Madrid in Ohio, Meunier scored twice to help PSG to a 3–1 win.

==== 2016–17 season ====
On 6 August 2016, Meunier made his first competitive appearance for PSG by coming on as a substitute for David Luiz in the 76th minute of the 2016 Trophée des Champions. After being an unused substitute for PSG's first two league matches of the 2016–17 season, he made his league debut for the club and played 28 minutes in a 3–1 loss against AS Monaco on 28 August 2016. Meunier found himself competing with Serge Aurier throughout the season and due to good performances by Aurier, Meunier often appeared on the substitute's bench.

After suffering a knee injury in late September, Meunier returned to the first team, starting in the right back position and scoring a goal, in a 2–0 league home win over Bordeaux on 1 October 2016. On 1 November 2016, Meunier assisted Blaise Matuidi's opening goal and scored the winning goal with a stunning 90th-minute side-footed curling volley in PSG's 2–1 away win over Basel in a 2016–17 UEFA Champions League Group A match; it was Meunier's first competitive goal for PSG. As a result of his good performance, he was named a member of the UEFA Team of the Week.

On 21 December 2016, Meunier scored his first league goal for the club, in a 5–0 win over Lorient. However, the next two months saw him sidelined with injuries on two occasions. Despite this, Meunier received more playing time throughout January 2017 as a right–back because Aurier had to play for his national team in the finals of the 2017 Africa Cup of Nations. The following month, he played the whole 90 minutes and set up a goal for Edinson Cavani, in a 4–0 win over Barcelona in the last 16 first leg of the 2016–17 UEFA Champions League. "We played the perfect match. Everyone was really looking forward to it, I have not seen that this season," he said right after that match. However, Meunier conceded a penalty and PSG lost 6–1 to Barcelona in the second leg; PSG were thus eliminated from the competition 6–5 on aggregate. "This is unacceptable. We had to start the game in a calmer way. That is what PSG lacks a bit. Finding an explanation is difficult," Meunier said.

Towards the end of the 2016–17 season, Meunier continued to compete for a first team place with Aurier. He suffered further injuries. Although he featured in both the Coupe de la Ligue and Coupe de France campaigns, Meunier did not play in both of the finals; he was on the substitute bench for the former and missed the latter because of an injury sustained. During the 2016–17 season, he made 36 appearances and scored twice in all competitions.

==== 2017–18 season ====
During the summer transfer window of 2017, Meunier was the subject of a transfer request when Premier League side Chelsea tried to sign him on the transfer window deadline day but had their bid rejected by PSG. At the start of the 2017–18 season, Meunier played his first competitive match of the season by starting as the right–back, in the 2–1 win over AS Monaco in the 2017 Trophée des Champions. After Aurier's departure to Tottenham Hostpur, he still had to compete for the right–back position due to the arrival of Dani Alves.

Having been an unused substitute for PSG's previous two league matches (against Guingamp and Toulouse), Meunier finally made his first league appearance of the season, replacing Dani Alves and then setting up a goal for Edinson Cavani, in a 3–0 home win over Saint-Étienne on 25 August 2017. It was not until 30 September 2017 when he scored his first goal of the season for the club, in a 6–2 league home win over Bordeaux. On 14 October 2017, Meunier scored both of PSG's goals in another league match, in a 2–1 win at Dijon. Between late–October and mid–December, he played twice in the league despite picking up an injury while playing for the national side.

On 13 December 2017, Meunier started in the right–back position and assisted two goals, in a 4–2 win over RC Strasbourg. A month later, on 30 January 2018, Meunier scored again in the semi-finals of Coupe de la Ligue, in a 3–2 win over Stade Rennais. He then scored his fourth goal of the season, in a 5–0 win over FC Metz on 10 March 2018. Towards the end of the 2017–18 season, he regained his right–back position in number of matches when Alves was absent from the first team, due to injury and suspension. On 8 May 2018, he came off the bench as PSG won 2–0 against Les Herbiers VF to clinch the Coupe de France. Meunier also won his first league title at PSG after beating Monaco on 15 April 2018. At the end of the 2017–18 season, he went on to make 34 appearances and scoring 5 times in all competitions.

==== 2018–19 season ====
On 18 September 2018, Meunier scored a goal in a 2–3 loss to Liverpool in 2018–19 UEFA Champions League group stage. On 6 March 2019, he came on as a substitute in a 1–3 loss to Manchester United, in which Paris Saint-Germain were eliminated from the Champions League round of 16 on away goals.

==== 2019–20 season ====
In the 2019–20 UEFA Champions League group stage, he scored a goal in a 3–0 win over Real Madrid on 18 September 2019. On 4 March 2020, he played his last match with Paris Saint-Germain in a 5–1 win over Lyon in the 2019–20 Coupe de France semi-final. PSG ultimately reached the final of the Champions League, but as this was postponed until August, Meunier had already signed for Dortmund by that time.

=== Borussia Dortmund ===
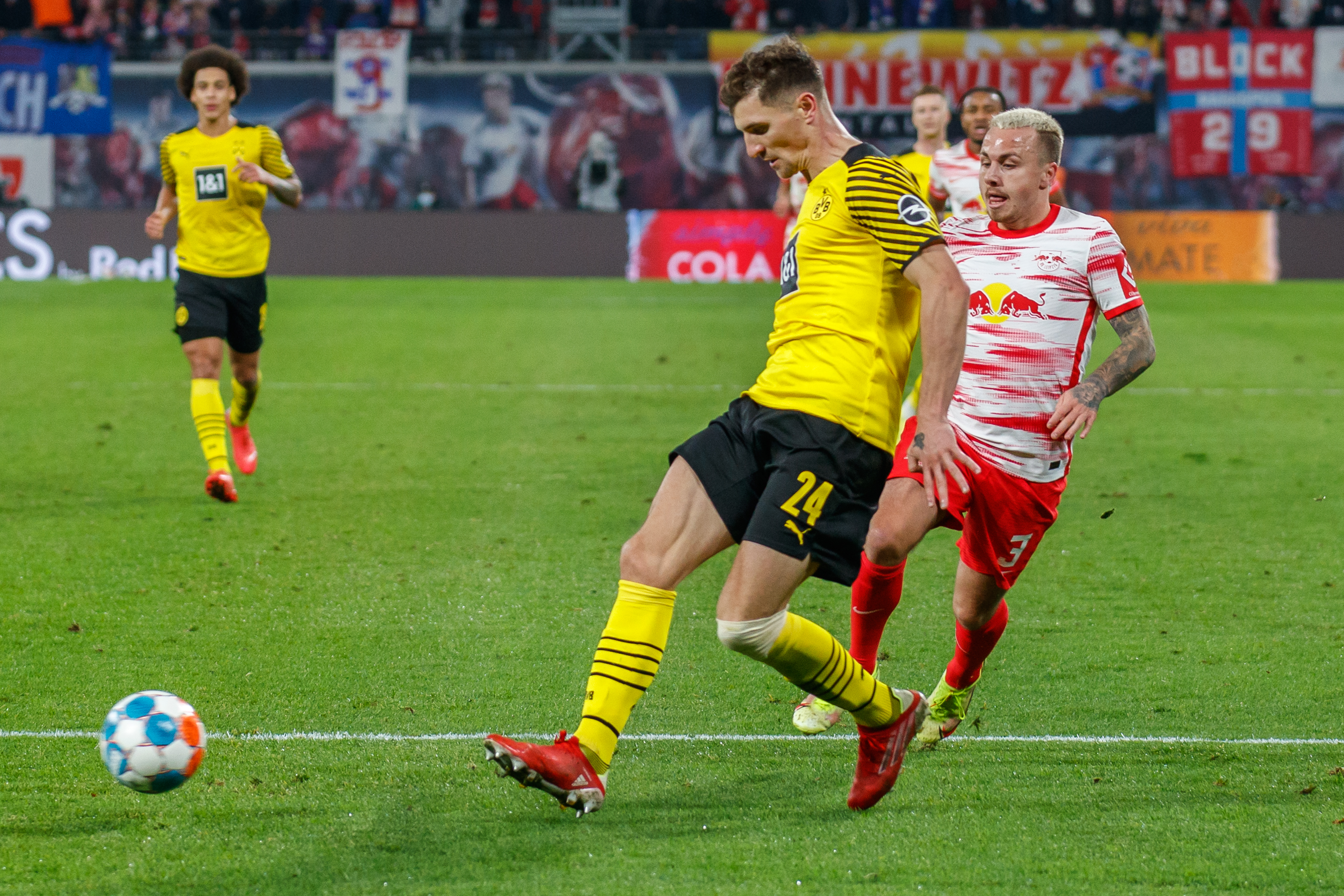
Meunier with Borussia Dortmund in 2021

On 25 June 2020, it was announced that Meunier would be joining Borussia Dortmund from PSG on a four-year deal as a free agent.

=== Trabzonspor ===
On 7 February 2024, Meunier moved to Trabzonspor in Turkey.

=== Lille ===
On 19 July 2024, French club Lille announced the signing of Meunier on a two-year contract.

=== Sunderland ===
On 15 July 2026, Meunier joined Premier League club Sunderland on a two-year contract.

== International career ==
=== Youth career ===
After appearing for the Belgium U15 team, Meunier was called up for the Belgium U21 team for the first time in February 2011, but did not play.

Meunier was called up for the second time in August 2011 and finally made his Belgium U21 debut on 9 August 2011, in a 3–2 friendly loss against Turkey U21. On 6 September 2011, he then scored his first U21 goal, in the 2013 UEFA European Under-21 Championship qualification 4–1 home win over Azerbaijan U21. He made seven appearances (five of those were in 2013 UEFA European Under-21 Football Championship qualification matches) and scored once for the Belgium U21 team.

=== Senior career ===
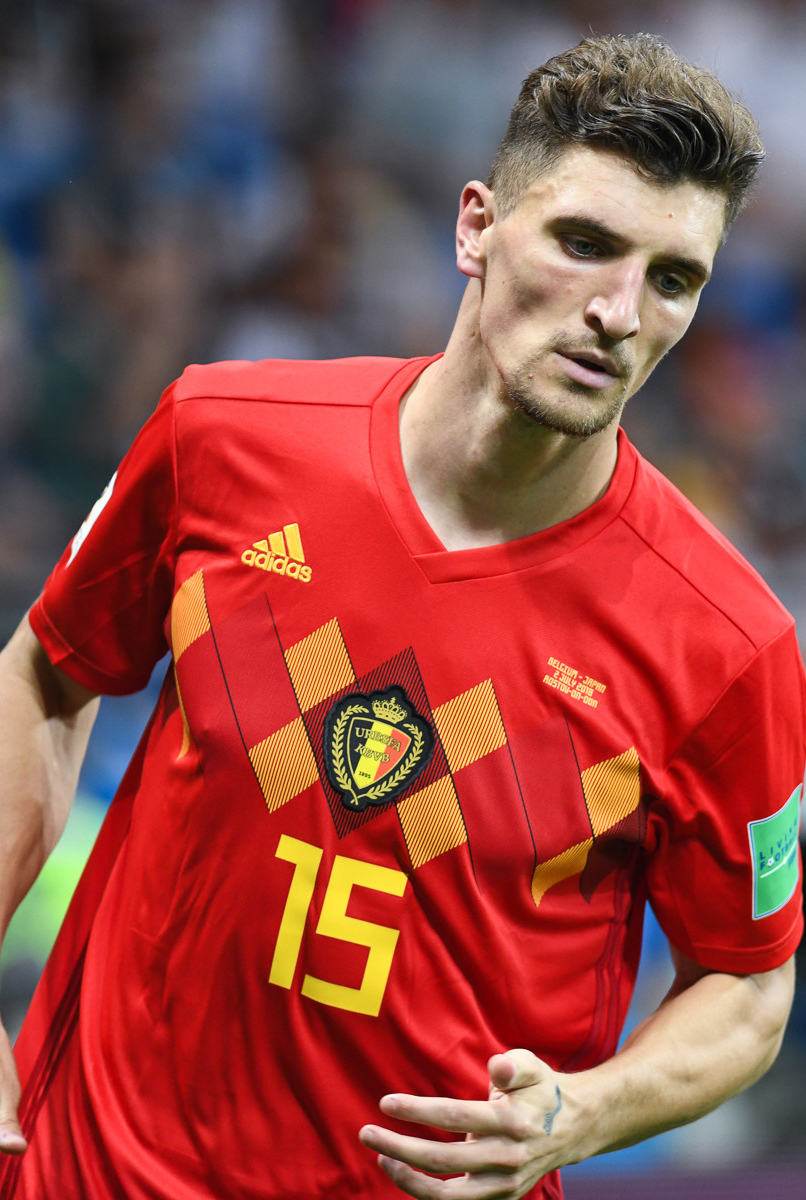
Meunier playing for Belgium at the 2018 World Cup in Russia

After being called up to the senior side for the first time on 14 November 2013, Meunier made his debut for the Belgium national team in a home friendly match against Colombia, which was preparation for the 2014 FIFA World Cup in Brazil. He also appeared as a substitute in two further friendlies, against Japan (3–2 loss) and Iceland (3–1 win), but was not included in coach Marc Wilmots' final 23-man squad for the tournament.

After missing out in the World Cup, Meunier was called up in November 2014 and made his first appearance in almost a year, in a 3–1 win over Iceland on 12 November 2014.

After being called up to the squad for the Euro 2016, Meunier played the whole 90 minutes at right back in the UEFA Euro 2016 group stage and then set up a goal for Axel Witsel, in a 3–0 win over Republic of Ireland. He also aided his team in keeping another clean sheet in 90 minutes at right back in another victory over Sweden four days later. He also started in Belgium's 4–0 round of 16 win against Hungary. Meunier finished the UEFA Euro 2016 campaign with five appearances for the side.

On 13 November 2016, Meunier scored in the 8th minute in Belgium's 8–1 2018 FIFA World Cup Qualification win over Estonia at the King Baudouin Stadium to register his first ever senior international goal. On 31 August 2017, Meunier recorded his first career senior international hat-trick in Belgium's 9–0 defeat of Gibraltar, a match in which he also recorded four assists. On 7 October 2017, he scored the opening goal of Belgium's 4–3 defeat of Bosnia and Herzegovina to end the 2018 World Cup qualifying campaign with five goals and seven assists from eight matches.

Meunier was selected in Belgium's final 23-man squad for the 2018 FIFA World Cup. He was Belgium's first-choice right midfielder and played his first World Cup match, in a 3–0 win over Panama in their opening group game at the 2018 FIFA World Cup. In a next match against Tunisia on 23 June 2018, Meunier set up Romelu Lukaku's second goal of the game, in a 5–2 win to qualify for the Round of 16. He also set up Nacer Chadli to score in injury time in a 3–2 victory over Japan in the round of 16 of the 2018 FIFA World Cup. However, after a 2–1 win over Brazil on 6 July 2018, he received another booking, which caused him to miss the semi–finals. On 14 July 2018, Meunier returned from suspension, scoring the opening goal of the match for Belgium in a 2–0 victory against England in their third-place play-off, his nation's best-ever World Cup finish.

On 12 June 2021, Meunier came on as a substitute for the injured Timothy Castagne after just 27 minutes and scored Belgium's second goal in the 34th minute during a 3–0 win in their first Euro 2020 group stage match against Russia. In doing so, Meunier became the first ever player to score a first half goal after coming on as a substitute in the UEFA European Championship.

Meunier was part of Belgium's squad for the 2022 FIFA World Cup in Qatar. After appearing as a half-time substitute in the opening match against Canada, he started both the 2–0 loss against Morocco and the 0–0 draw with Croatia as Belgium were eliminated at the group stage.

On 28 May 2024, Meunier was named in Belgium's squad for UEFA Euro 2024. After suffering an injury in a pre-tournament friendly against Luxembourg, Meunier remained in Antwerp for treatment during the team's opening two matches. He arrived in Germany to join up with the Belgian squad on 24 Junebut did not take part in the third group match, or the round of 16 match, where Belgium were knocked out by France.

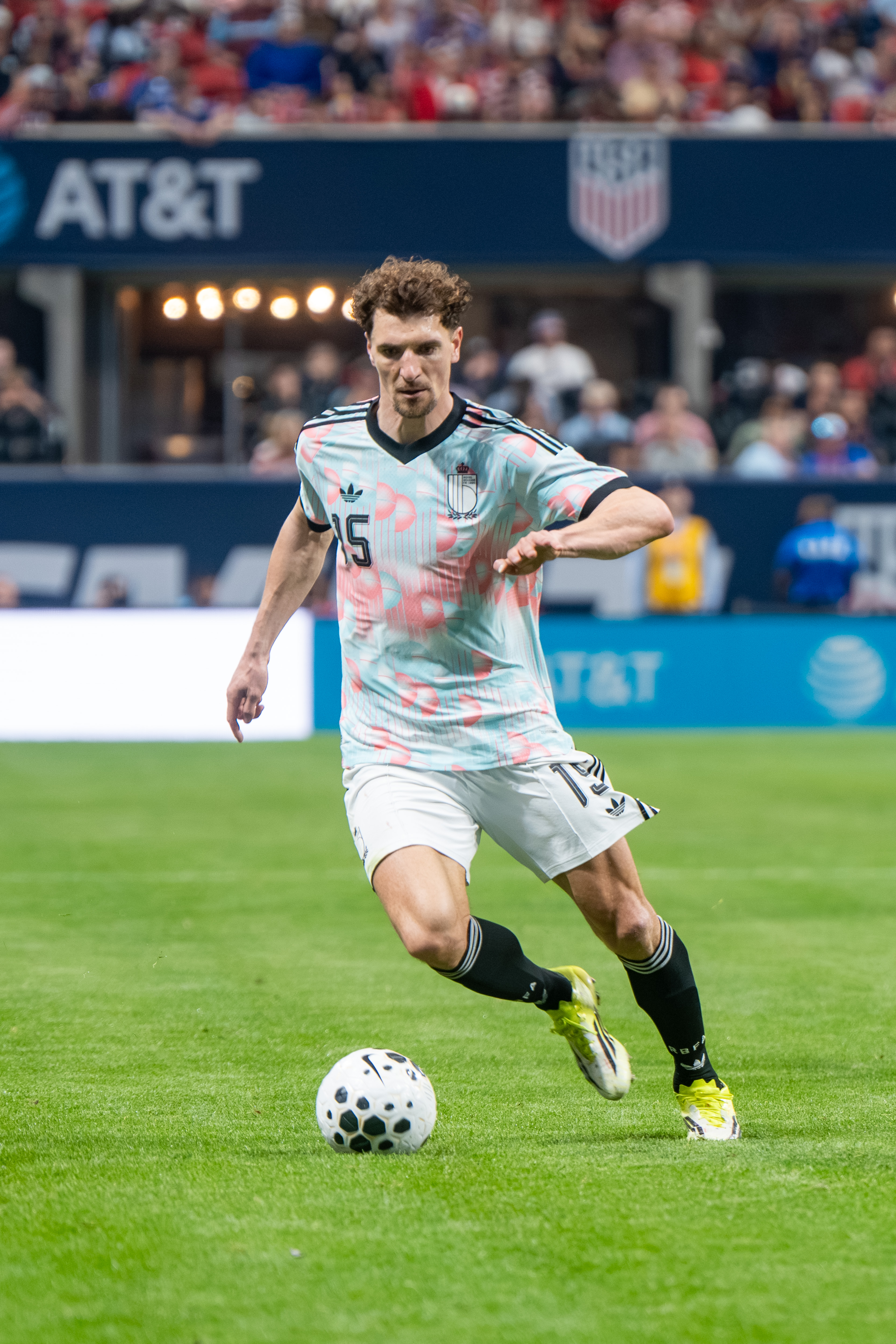
Meunier playing for Belgium in 2026

On 15 May 2026, he was named in Belgium's squad for the 2026 FIFA World Cup.

== Personal life ==
Growing up, Meunier idolised Brazil World Cup winner Ronaldo, saying: "He evolves, like me, at the center forward position. I liked his style of play and his dribbling". He was quoted in an interview saying that he supported Anderlecht growing up, but this turned out to be incorrect.

He revealed that he didn't have an easy childhood: his parents divorced when he was a teenager and started a new life with his mother and sister. While at Virton, Meunier worked part time at a car factory and as a postman, receiving a diploma for finishing school. Outside of football, he's also a fan of art. He opened a catering business in his hometown of Bastogne and has thought about becoming a baker once his football career is over.

Meunier speaks fluent French, Flemish, English, and German. In November 2012, Meunier was fined €120 and given a 13-day driving ban after being convicted of speeding. After his conviction, Meunier began taking driving lessons again.

Meunier is in a relationship with Deborah Panzokou, having known her since high school. In May 2015, it was announced that the couple were expecting their first child. Deborah gave birth to a baby boy, Landrys, (born in December 2015). In October 2017, it was announced that the couple were expecting their second child, who was born in April 2018.

== Career statistics ==
=== Club ===
As of match played 31 October 2026

Appearances and goals by club, season and competition
Club	Season	League			National cup (Note: Includes Belgian Cup, Coupe de France, DFB-Pokal, Turkish Cup)		League cup (Note: Includes Coupe de la Ligue, EFL Cup)		Europe		Other		Total	
Club	Season	Division	Apps	Goals	Apps	Goals	Apps	Goals	Apps	Goals	Apps	Goals	Apps	Goals
R.E. Virton	2008–09	Belgian Second Division	5	0	1	0	—		—		—		6	0
R.E. Virton	2009–10	Belgian Third Division	16	5	1	0	—		—		—		17	5
R.E. Virton	2010–11	Belgian Third Division	28	10	1	1	—		—		—		29	11
R.E. Virton	Total		49	15	3	1	—		—		—		52	16
Club Brugge	2011–12	Belgian Pro League	35	3	2	1	—		12 (Note: Appearances in UEFA Europa League)	1	—		49	5
Club Brugge	2012–13	Belgian Pro League	21	4	1	0	—		6 (Note: Two appearances in UEFA Champions League, four appearances in UEFA Europa League)	0	—		28	4
Club Brugge	2013–14	Belgian Pro League	32	3	1	0	—		0	0	—		33	3
Club Brugge	2014–15	Belgian Pro League	30	2	5	0	—		11	0	—		46	2
Club Brugge	2015–16	Belgian Pro League	31	3	5	1	—		6	2	—		42	6
Club Brugge	Total		149	15	14	2	—		35	3	—		198	20
Paris Saint-Germain	2016–17	Ligue 1	22	1	4	0	3	0	6 (Note: Appearance(s) in UEFA Champions League)	1	1 (Note: Appearance in Trophée des Champions)	0	36	2
Paris Saint-Germain	2017–18	Ligue 1	24	4	5	0	3	1	1	0	1	0	34	5
Paris Saint-Germain	2018–19	Ligue 1	22	3	3	1	1	0	5	1	0	0	31	5
Paris Saint-Germain	2019–20	Ligue 1	16	0	3	0	2	0	5	1	1	0	27	1
Paris Saint-Germain	Total		84	8	15	1	9	1	17	3	3	0	128	13
Borussia Dortmund	2020–21	Bundesliga	21	1	4	0	—		7	0	1 (Note: Appearance in DFL-Supercup)	0	33	1
Borussia Dortmund	2021–22	Bundesliga	17	2	2	0	—		7 (Note: Six appearances in UEFA Champions League, one appearance in UEFA Europa League)	0	0	0	26	2
Borussia Dortmund	2022–23	Bundesliga	10	0	2	0	—		4	0	—		16	0
Borussia Dortmund	2023–24	Bundesliga	8	0	0	0	—		0	0	—		8	0
Borussia Dortmund	Total		56	3	8	0	—		18	0	1	0	83	3
Borussia Dortmund II	2022–23	3. Liga	2	0	—		—		—		—		2	0
Borussia Dortmund II	2023–24	3. Liga	1	0	—		—		—		—		1	0
Borussia Dortmund II	Total		3	0	—		—		—		—		3	0
Trabzonspor	2023–24	Süper Lig	14	1	5	0	—		—		—		19	1
Lille	2024–25	Ligue 1	30	2	3	0	—		13	0	—		46	2
Lille	2025–26	Ligue 1	25	1	2	0	—		8	0	—		35	1
Lille	Total		55	3	5	0	—		21	0	—		81	3
Sunderland	2026–27	Premier League	7	0	0	0	1	0	1	0	—		9	0
Career total			417	45	50	3	10	1	92	6	4	0	573	55

=== International ===
As of match played 1 July 2026

Appearances and goals by national team and year
National team	Year	Apps	Goals
Belgium	2013	2	0
Belgium	2014	1	0
Belgium	2015	2	0
Belgium	2016	10	1
Belgium	2017	6	4
Belgium	2018	15	1
Belgium	2019	4	1
Belgium	2020	4	0
Belgium	2021	10	1
Belgium	2022	8	0
Belgium	2023	0	0
Belgium	2024	5	0
Belgium	2025	9	2
Belgium	2026	7	0
Total		83	10

As of match played 13 October 2025. Belgium score listed first, score column indicates score after each Meunier goal.

International goals by date, venue, cap, opponent, score, result and competition
No.	Date	Venue	Cap	Opponent	Score	Result	Competition
1	14 November 2016	King Baudouin Stadium, Brussels, Belgium	15	Estonia	1–0	8–1	2018 FIFA World Cup qualification
2	31 August 2017	Stade Maurice Dufrasne, Liège, Belgium	16	Gibraltar	2–0	9–0	2018 FIFA World Cup qualification
3	31 August 2017	Stade Maurice Dufrasne, Liège, Belgium	16	Gibraltar	7–0	9–0	2018 FIFA World Cup qualification
4	31 August 2017	Stade Maurice Dufrasne, Liège, Belgium	16	Gibraltar	8–0	9–0	2018 FIFA World Cup qualification
5	7 October 2017	Stadion Grbavica, Sarajevo, Bosnia and Herzegovina	18	Bosnia and Herzegovina	1–0	4–3	2018 FIFA World Cup qualification
6	14 July 2018	Krestovsky Stadium, Saint Petersburg, Russia	30	England	1–0	2–0	2018 FIFA World Cup
7	13 October 2019	Astana Arena, Nur-Sultan, Kazakhstan	39	Kazakhstan	2–0	2–0	UEFA Euro 2020 qualifying
8	12 June 2021	Krestovsky Stadium, Saint Petersburg, Russia	48	Russia	2–0	3–0	UEFA Euro 2020
9	7 September 2025	Constant Vanden Stock Stadium, Anderlecht, Belgium	73	Kazakhstan	6–0	6–0	2026 FIFA World Cup qualification
10	13 October 2025	Cardiff City Stadium, Cardiff, Wales	75	Wales	2–1	4–2	2026 FIFA World Cup qualification

== Honours ==
Club Brugge

- Belgian Pro League: 2015–16
- Belgian Cup: 2014–15

Paris Saint Germain

- Ligue 1: 2017–18, 2018–19, 2019–20
- Coupe de France: 2017–18, 2019–20; runner-up: 2018–19
- Coupe de la Ligue: 2016–17, 2017–18, 2019–20
- Trophée des Champions: 2016, 2017, 2019

Borussia Dortmund

- DFB-Pokal: 2020–21

Belgium

- FIFA World Cup third place: 2018

Individual

- Godefroid of Honour: 2016
- Marca/Forbes World Cup All-Star team: 2018
