= 2023–24 Borussia Dortmund II season =

Borussia Dortmund II
2023–24 season
- President: Reinhard Rauball
- Head coach: Jan Zimmermann
- Stadium: Signal Iduna Park; Stadion Rote Erde
- 3. Liga: 11th
Home colours	Away colours	Third colours

The 2023–24 season is Borussia Dortmund II's 115th season in existence and third consecutive in the 3. Liga.

== Players ==
=== First-team squad ===
As of 11 August 2023

Note: Flags indicate national team as defined under FIFA eligibility rules; some limited exceptions apply. Players may hold more than one non-FIFA nationality.

No.	Pos.	Nation	Player
1	GK	(Germany) GER	Marian Kirsch
3	DF	(Spain) ESP	Guille Bueno
4	DF	(France) FRA	Felix Irorere
5	DF	(Croatia) CRO	Mario Šuver
6	MF	(Germany) GER	Ayman Azhil
7	FW	(Germany) GER	Samuel Bamba
8	MF	(Germany) GER	Franz Roggow
9	FW	(Germany) GER	Ted Tattermusch
10	MF	(Germany) GER	Falko Michel
11	FW	(Germany) GER	Justin Butler
13	DF	(Germany) GER	Bjarne Pudel
14	MF	(Germany) GER	Michael Eberwein
16	MF	(Germany) GER	Dennis Lütke-Frie
17	DF	(Germany) GER	Patrick Göbel
18	DF	(Germany) GER	Antonios Papadopoulos

No.	Pos.	Nation	Player
21	DF	(Germany) GER	Hendry Blank
22	FW	(Germany) GER	Paul-Philipp Besong
23	MF	(Germany) GER	Franz Pfanne (captain)
27	FW	(Germany) GER	Rodney Elongo-Yombo
29	FW	(Germany) GER	Jermain Nischalke (on loan from 1. FC Nürnberg)
31	GK	(Germany) GER	Silas Ostrzinski
32	GK	(Germany) GER	Tiago Estevão
32	MF	(Guinea) GUI	Abdoulaye Kamara
33	FW	(Germany) GER	Moses Otuali
35	GK	(Poland) POL	Marcel Lotka
37	DF	(Germany) GER	Lion Semić
39	DF	(Netherlands) NED	Prince Aning
41	DF	(Germany) GER	Nnamdi Collins
—	FW	(Germany) GER	Julian Hettwer

=== Out on loan ===
Note: Flags indicate national team as defined under FIFA eligibility rules; some limited exceptions apply. Players may hold more than one non-FIFA nationality.

No.	Pos.	Nation	Player
—	FW	(Croatia) CRO	Noa-Gabriel Šimić (at Rot-Weiß Erfurt until 30 June 2024)

== Transfers ==
=== In ===
Pos.	Player	Transferred from	Fee	Date	Source
MF	(Morocco) Ayman Azhil	(Germany) Bayer Leverkusen	Free	1 July 2023	

=== Out ===
Pos.	Player	Transferred to	Fee	Date	Source
FW	(Netherlands) Jayden Braaf	(Italy) Hellas Verona	€1,000,000	2 July 2023	

== Pre-season and friendlies ==
Win Draw Loss Fixtures

8 July 2023 Friendly	ASC Dortmund (Germany)	1–2	(Germany) Borussia Dortmund II	Dortmund
15:00				Stadium: Waldstadion Aplerbeck

14 July 2023 Friendly	Mainz II (Germany)	0–2	(Germany) Borussia Dortmund II	Mainz
14:00				Stadium: Stadion am Bruchweg

20 July 2023 Friendly	Borussia Dortmund II (Germany)	0–0	(Belgium) Lommel	Salzburg, Austria
18:00				Stadium: 28 BLACK ARENA-Nonntal

29 July 2023 Friendly	Go Ahead Eagles (Netherlands)	0–2	(Germany) Borussia Dortmund II
14:00

6 January 2024 Friendly	Hansa Rostock (Germany)	3–1	(Germany) Borussia Dortmund II	Belek, Turkey
17:30				Stadium: Bellis Hotel Sports Center - Field 1

14 January 2024 Friendly	Borussia Dortmund II (Germany)	0–0	(Germany) Fortuna Köln	Dortmund
15:00				Stadium: Fußballpark BVB Hohenbuschei Platz 5

== Competitions ==
=== Overall record ===
Competition	First match	Last match	Starting round	Record							
Competition	First match	Last match	Starting round	Pld	W	D	L	GF	GA	GD	Win %
3. Liga	5 August 2023	18 May 2024	Matchday 1	35	13	11	11	54	49	+5	37.14
Total				35	13	11	11	54	49	+5	37.14

Last updated: 27 April 2024
Source: Soccerway

=== 3. Liga ===
==== League table ====
Pos	Team	Pld	W	D	L	GF	GA	GD	Pts
9	SpVgg Unterhaching	38	16	7	15	50	49	+1	55
10	FC Ingolstadt	38	14	12	12	65	51	+14	54
11	Borussia Dortmund II (Note: Reserve teams are ineligible for promotion or DFB-Pokal qualification.)	38	14	12	12	58	53	+5	54
12	SC Verl	38	14	11	13	59	56	+3	53
13	Viktoria Köln	38	13	10	15	59	65	−6	49

Source: DFB
Rules for classification: 1) Points; 2) Goal difference; 3) Goals scored; 4) Head-to-head results; 5) Head-to-head away goals scored; 6) Away goals scored; 7) Play-off.

==== Results summary ====
Overall								Home						Away					
Pld	W	D	L	GF	GA	GD	Pts	W	D	L	GF	GA	GD	W	D	L	GF	GA	GD
35	13	11	11	54	49	+5	50	7	5	6	27	24	+3	6	6	5	27	25	+2

Last updated: 27 April 2024.

==== Results by round ====
Round	1	2	3	4	5	6	7	8	9	10	11	12	13
Ground	A	H	A	H	A	H	A	H	H	A	H	A	H
Result	D	W	D	L	L	W	W	D	W	D	L	W	L
Position	12	6	8	12	15	9	5	10	5	6	7	4	8

Updated to match(es) played on 27 April 2024. Source:
A = Away; H = Home; W = Win; D = Draw; L = Loss

==== Matches ====
The league fixtures were unveiled on 7 July 2023.

5 August 2023 1	Preußen Münster	0–0	Borussia Dortmund II	Münster
14:00		Report		Stadium: Preußenstadion; Attendance: 11,744; Referee: Konrad Oldhafer

20 August 2023 2	Borussia Dortmund II	1–0	SC Freiburg II	Dortmund
13:30	Eberwein 45+2'	Report		Stadium: Rote Erde; Attendance: 1,692; Referee: Eric Weisbach

23 August 2023 3	Jahn Regensburg	0–0	Borussia Dortmund II	Regensburg
19:00		Report		Stadium: Jahnstadion Regensburg; Attendance: 8,418; Referee: Luca Jürgensen

26 August 2023 4	Borussia Dortmund II	0–2	Dynamo Dresden	Dortmund
14:00		Report	Kutschke 6'; Borkowski 77' (pen.)	Stadium: Rote Erde; Attendance: 3,873; Referee: Florian Heft

2 September 2023 5	1. FC Saarbrücken	2–0	Borussia Dortmund II	Saarbrücken
19:00	Rabihic 37'; Brünker 58'	Report		Stadium: Ludwigsparkstadion; Attendance: 11,065; Referee: Mario Hildenbrand

16 September 2023 6	Borussia Dortmund II	2–1	Viktoria Köln	Dortmund
14:00	Hettwer 6'; Pohlmann 51' (pen.)	Report	Koronkiewicz 14'	Stadium: Rote Erde; Attendance: 4,000; Referee: Felix Prigan

23 September 2023 7	SC Verl	2–3	Borussia Dortmund II	Verl
14:00 UTC+2	Wolfram 22'; Batista Meier 63'	Report	Hettwer 15'; Göbel 74'; Butler 90+4'	Stadium: Sportclub Arena; Attendance: 1,749; Referee: Patrick Kessel

27 September 2023 9	Borussia Dortmund II	1–0	MSV Duisburg	Dortmund
19:00 UTC+2	Besong 14'	Report		Stadium: Rote Erde; Attendance: 3,913; Referee: Robert Kampka

1 October 2023 8	Borussia Dortmund II	2–2	SpVgg Unterhaching	Dortmund
16:30 UTC+2	Hettwer 5'; Besong 33'	Report	Fetsch 36'; Hobsch 87'	Stadium: Rote Erde; Attendance: 2,802; Referee: Nico Fuchs

7 October 2023 10	Arminia Bielefeld	2–2	Borussia Dortmund II	Bielefeld
14:00 UTC+2	Wörl 27'; Klos 69'	Report	Elongo-Yombo 45', 54'	Stadium: SchücoArena; Attendance: 15,837; Referee: Daniel Bartnitzki

13 October 2023 11	Borussia Dortmund II	1–2	Rot-Weiß Essen	Dortmund
19:00 UTC+2	Michel 57'	Report	Kourouma 30'; Müsel 58'	Stadium: Signal-Iduna-Park; Attendance: 17,093; Referee: Riem Hussein

20 October 2023 12	Waldhof Mannheim	1–3	Borussia Dortmund II	Mannheim
19:00 UTC+2	Karbstein 27'	Report	Hettwer 1'; Michel 14'; Pohlmann 69'	Stadium: Carl-Benz-Stadion; Attendance: 8,514; Referee: Tom Bauer

28 October 2023 13	Borussia Dortmund II	1–2	SV Sandhausen	Dortmund
14:00 UTC+2	Hettwer 9'	Report	Hennings 16' (pen.); Geschwill 36'	Stadium: Rote Erde; Attendance: 1,903; Referee: Jarno Wienefeld

4 November 2023 14	FC Ingolstadt	1–1	Borussia Dortmund II	Ingolstadt
16:30 UTC+1	Testroet 51'	Report	Eberwein 34'	Stadium: Audi-Sportpark; Attendance: 4,326; Referee: Michael Bacher

11 November 2023 15	Borussia Dortmund II	1–1	VfB Lübeck	Dortmund
16:30 UTC+1	Elongo-Yombo 62'	Report	Reddemann 66'	Stadium: Rote Erde; Attendance: 900; Referee: Assad Nouhoum
