= Tattermusch =

Tattermusch is a German surname. It is also rarely found in the Czech Republic (feminine: Tattermuschová). Notable people with the surname include:

- Helena Tattermuschová (1933–2025), Czech soprano singer
- Ted Tattermusch (born 2001), German footballer
