= UEFA Euro 2020 Group B =

Football tournament group stage

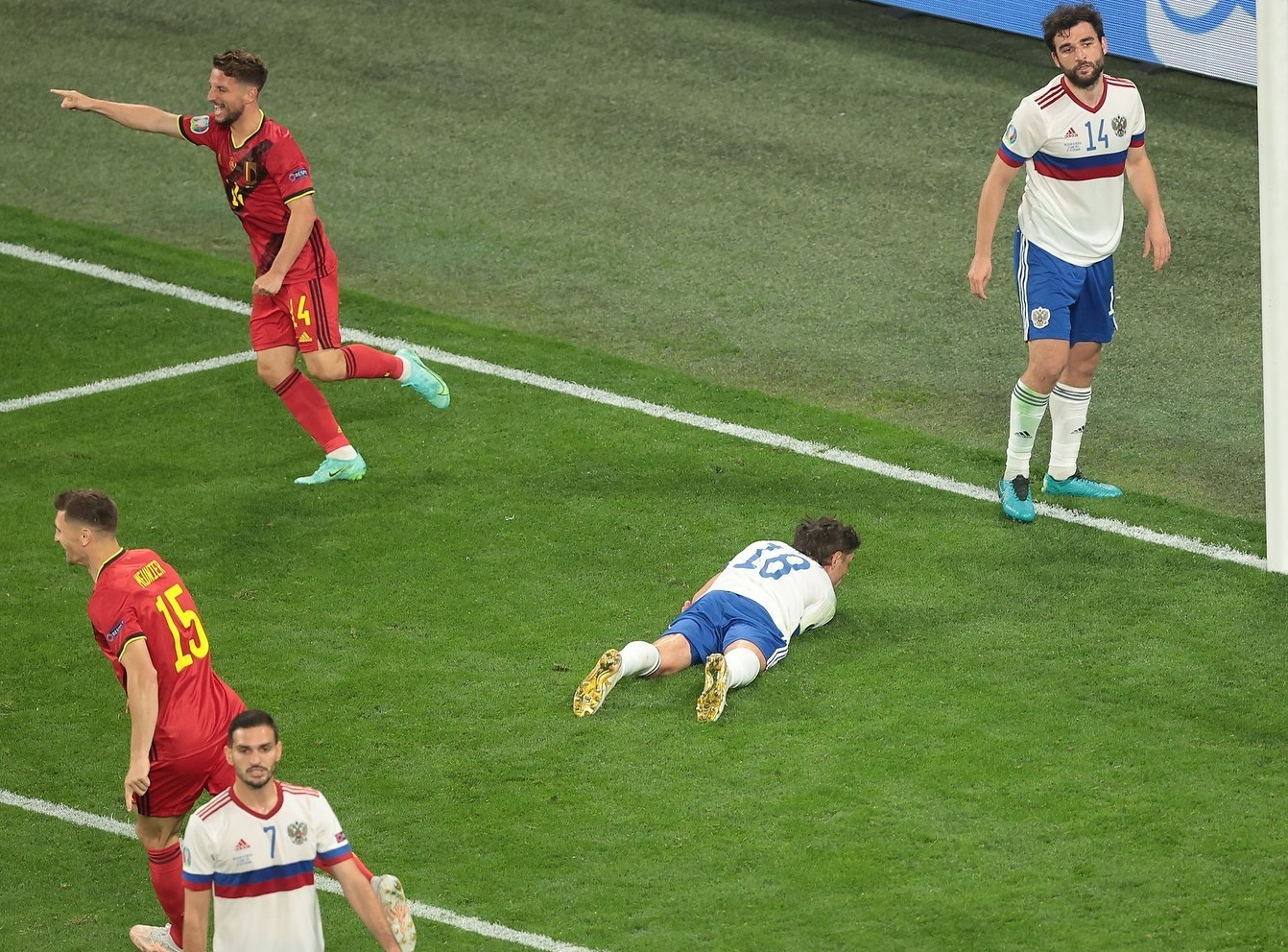
Thomas Meunier (number 15) scored the second goal for Belgium against Russia.

Group B of UEFA Euro 2020 took place from 12 to 21 June 2021 in Copenhagen's Parken Stadium and Saint Petersburg's Krestovsky Stadium. The group contained host nation Denmark, Finland, Belgium and host nation Russia. The head-to-head match between the hosts took place at Denmark's Parken Stadium.

== Teams ==
Draw position	Team	Pot	Method of qualification	Date of qualification	Finals appearance	Last appearance	Previous best performance	Qualifying Rankings November 2019 (Note: The European Qualifiers overall rankings from November 2019 were used for seeding for the final draw.)	FIFA Rankings May 2021
B1	Denmark (host)	3	Group D runner-up	18 November 2019	9th	2012	Winners (1992)	15	10
B2	Finland	4	Group J runner-up	15 November 2019	1st	—	Debut	20	54
B3	Belgium	1	Group I winner	10 October 2019	6th	2016	Runners-up (1980)	1	1
B4	Russia (Note: From 1960 to 1988, Russia competed as the Soviet Union, and in 1992 as CIS.) (host)	2	Group I runner-up	13 October 2019	12th	2016	Winners (1960)	12	38

== Standings ==
Pos	Team	Pld	W	D	L	GF	GA	GD	Pts	Qualification
1	Belgium	3	3	0	0	7	1	+6	9	Advance to knockout stage
2	Denmark (H)	3	1	0	2	5	4	+1	3 (Note: Tied on head-to-head points (3). Head-to-head goal difference: Denmark +2, Finland 0, Russia −2.)	Advance to knockout stage
3	Finland	3	1	0	2	1	3	−2	3	
4	Russia (H)	3	1	0	2	2	7	−5	3	

Source: UEFA
Rules for classification: Group stage tiebreakers
(H) Hosts
Notes:

In the round of 16,

- The winner of Group B, Belgium, advanced to play the third-placed team of Group F, Portugal.
- The runner-up of Group B, Denmark, advanced to play the runner-up of Group A, Wales.

== Matches ==
=== Denmark vs Finland ===
In the 43rd minute, the match was suspended after Danish midfielder Christian Eriksen collapsed on the pitch due to a cardiac arrest. Eriksen was transferred to Rigshospitalet where he was stabilised. UEFA gave the players two options for restarting the match, either to resume later in the evening or the next day at 12:00 CEST. Only after receiving confirmation that Eriksen was awake, the Danish team agreed to continue the match that evening. The match was resumed at 20:30, with the last four minutes of the first half to be completed prior to a five-minute half-time break.

12 June 2021
18:00

Denmark	0–1	Finland
	Report	Pohjanpalo 60'

Parken Stadium, Copenhagen
Attendance: 13,790
Referee: Anthony Taylor (England)

Denmark	Finland

GK	1	Kasper Schmeichel
RB	18	Daniel Wass	(substituted off) 76'
CB	4	Simon Kjær (c)	(substituted off) 63'
CB	6	Andreas Christensen
LB	5	Joakim Mæhle
CM	10	Christian Eriksen	(substituted off) 43'
CM	23	Pierre-Emile Højbjerg
CM	8	Thomas Delaney	(substituted off) 76'
RF	20	Yussuf Poulsen
CF	19	Jonas Wind	(substituted off) 63'
LF	9	Martin Braithwaite
Substitutions:
MF	24	Mathias Jensen	(substituted on) 43'
FW	11	Andreas Skov Olsen	(substituted on) 63'
DF	3	Jannik Vestergaard	(substituted on) 63'
DF	17	Jens Stryger Larsen	(substituted on) 76'
FW	21	Andreas Cornelius	(substituted on) 76'
Manager:
Kasper Hjulmand

GK	1	Lukas Hradecky
CB	4	Joona Toivio
CB	2	Paulus Arajuuri
CB	3	Daniel O'Shaughnessy
DM	14	Tim Sparv (c)	(yellow card) 51'	(substituted off) 76'
CM	8	Robin Lod	(yellow card) 4'
CM	6	Glen Kamara
RW	22	Jukka Raitala		(substituted off) 90'
LW	18	Jere Uronen
CF	20	Joel Pohjanpalo		(substituted off) 84'
CF	10	Teemu Pukki		(substituted off) 76'
Substitutions:
MF	11	Rasmus Schüller		(substituted on) 76'
MF	19	Joni Kauko		(substituted on) 76'
FW	26	Marcus Forss		(substituted on) 84'
DF	5	Leo Väisänen		(substituted on) 90'
Manager:
Markku Kanerva

Man of the Match:
Christian Eriksen (Denmark)

Assistant referees:
Gary Beswick (England)
Adam Nunn (England)
Fourth official:
Sandro Schärer (Switzerland)
Reserve assistant referee:
Stéphane De Almeida (Switzerland)
Video assistant referee:
Stuart Attwell (England)
Assistant video assistant referees:
Chris Kavanagh (England)
Filippo Meli (Italy)
Marco Di Bello (Italy)

=== Belgium vs Russia ===
12 June 2021
21:00 (22:00 UTC+3)

Belgium	3–0	Russia
Lukaku 10', 88'; Meunier 34'	Report

Krestovsky Stadium, Saint Petersburg
Attendance: 26,264
Referee: Antonio Mateu Lahoz (Spain)

Belgium	Russia

GK	1	Thibaut Courtois
CB	2	Toby Alderweireld
CB	4	Dedryck Boyata
CB	5	Jan Vertonghen (c)	(substituted off) 77'
RM	21	Timothy Castagne	(substituted off) 27'
CM	19	Leander Dendoncker
CM	8	Youri Tielemans
LM	16	Thorgan Hazard
RF	14	Dries Mertens	(substituted off) 72'
CF	9	Romelu Lukaku
LF	11	Yannick Carrasco	(substituted off) 77'
Substitutions:
DF	15	Thomas Meunier	(substituted on) 27'
MF	10	Eden Hazard	(substituted on) 72'
DF	3	Thomas Vermaelen	(substituted on) 77'
MF	26	Dennis Praet	(substituted on) 77'
Manager:
(Spain) Roberto Martínez

GK	1	Anton Shunin
RB	2	Mário Fernandes
CB	5	Andrei Semyonov
CB	14	Georgi Dzhikiya
LB	18	Yuri Zhirkov	(substituted off) 43'
CM	7	Magomed Ozdoyev
CM	8	Dmitri Barinov	(substituted off) 46'
RW	11	Roman Zobnin	(substituted off) 63'
AM	17	Aleksandr Golovin
LW	23	Daler Kuzyayev	(substituted off) 29'
CF	22	Artem Dzyuba (c)
Substitutions:
MF	6	Denis Cheryshev	(substituted on) 29'	(substituted off) 63'
DF	4	Vyacheslav Karavayev	(substituted on) 43'
DF	3	Igor Diveyev	(substituted on) 46'
MF	26	Maksim Mukhin	(substituted on) 63'
MF	15	Aleksei Miranchuk		(substituted on) 63'
Manager:
Stanislav Cherchesov

Man of the Match:
Romelu Lukaku (Belgium)

Assistant referees:
Pau Cebrián Devís (Spain)
Roberto Díaz Pérez del Palomar (Spain)
Fourth official:
Fernando Rapallini (Argentina)
Reserve assistant referee:
Juan Pablo Belatti (Argentina)
Video assistant referee:
Alejandro Hernández Hernández (Spain)
Assistant video assistant referees:
João Pinheiro (Portugal)
Íñigo Prieto López de Cerain (Spain)
Juan Martínez Munuera (Spain)

=== Finland vs Russia ===
16 June 2021
15:00 (16:00 UTC+3)

Finland	0–1	Russia
	Report	Miranchuk 45+2'

Krestovsky Stadium, Saint Petersburg
Attendance: 24,540
Referee: Danny Makkelie (Netherlands)

Finland	Russia

GK	1	Lukas Hradecky
CB	4	Joona Toivio		(substituted off) 85'
CB	2	Paulus Arajuuri (c)
CB	3	Daniel O'Shaughnessy	(yellow card) 90'
CM	11	Rasmus Schüller		(substituted off) 67'
CM	6	Glen Kamara	(yellow card) 22'
RW	22	Jukka Raitala		(substituted off) 75'
AM	8	Robin Lod
LW	18	Jere Uronen
CF	10	Teemu Pukki		(substituted off) 75'
CF	20	Joel Pohjanpalo
Substitutions:
MF	19	Joni Kauko		(substituted on) 67'
MF	13	Pyry Soiri		(substituted on) 75'
FW	21	Lassi Lappalainen		(substituted on) 75'
MF	9	Fredrik Jensen		(substituted on) 85'
Manager:
Markku Kanerva

GK	16	Matvei Safonov
RB	2	Mário Fernandes		(substituted off) 26'
CB	3	Igor Diveyev
CB	14	Georgi Dzhikiya	(yellow card) 88'
LB	23	Daler Kuzyayev
CM	11	Roman Zobnin
CM	8	Dmitri Barinov	(yellow card) 27'
CM	7	Magomed Ozdoyev	(yellow card) 34'	(substituted off) 61'
RF	15	Aleksei Miranchuk		(substituted off) 85'
CF	22	Artem Dzyuba (c)		(substituted off) 85'
LF	17	Aleksandr Golovin
Substitutions:
DF	4	Vyacheslav Karavayev		(substituted on) 26'
MF	19	Rifat Zhemaletdinov		(substituted on) 61'
FW	9	Aleksandr Sobolev		(substituted on) 85'
MF	26	Maksim Mukhin		(substituted on) 85'
Manager:
Stanislav Cherchesov

Man of the Match:
Aleksei Miranchuk (Russia)

Assistant referees:
Hessel Steegstra (Netherlands)
Jan de Vries (Netherlands)
Fourth official:
István Kovács (Romania)
Reserve assistant referee:
Vasile Marinescu (Romania)
Video assistant referee:
Pol van Boekel (Netherlands)
Assistant video assistant referees:
Kevin Blom (Netherlands)
Benjamin Pagès (France)
Jérôme Brisard (France)

=== Denmark vs Belgium ===
17 June 2021
18:00

Denmark	1–2	Belgium
Poulsen 2'	Report	T. Hazard 55'; De Bruyne 70'

Parken Stadium, Copenhagen
Attendance: 23,395
Referee: Björn Kuipers (Netherlands)

Denmark	Belgium

GK	1	Kasper Schmeichel
RB	6	Andreas Christensen
CB	4	Simon Kjær (c)
CB	3	Jannik Vestergaard		(substituted off) 84'
LB	5	Joakim Mæhle
CM	18	Daniel Wass	(yellow card) 59'	(substituted off) 61'
CM	23	Pierre-Emile Højbjerg
CM	8	Thomas Delaney		(substituted off) 72'
RW	20	Yussuf Poulsen		(substituted off) 61'
CF	14	Mikkel Damsgaard	(yellow card) 69'	(substituted off) 72'
LW	9	Martin Braithwaite
Substitutions:
MF	15	Christian Nørgaard		(substituted on) 61'
DF	17	Jens Stryger Larsen		(substituted on) 61'
FW	21	Andreas Cornelius		(substituted on) 72'
MF	24	Mathias Jensen	(yellow card) 81'	(substituted on) 72'
FW	11	Andreas Skov Olsen		(substituted on) 84'
Manager:
Kasper Hjulmand

GK	1	Thibaut Courtois
CB	2	Toby Alderweireld
CB	18	Jason Denayer
CB	5	Jan Vertonghen (c)
RM	15	Thomas Meunier
CM	8	Youri Tielemans
CM	19	Leander Dendoncker		(substituted off) 59'
LM	16	Thorgan Hazard	(yellow card) 90+4'	(substituted off) 90+4'
RF	14	Dries Mertens		(substituted off) 46'
CF	9	Romelu Lukaku
LF	11	Yannick Carrasco		(substituted off) 59'
Substitutions:
MF	7	Kevin De Bruyne		(substituted on) 46'
MF	10	Eden Hazard		(substituted on) 59'
MF	6	Axel Witsel		(substituted on) 59'
DF	3	Thomas Vermaelen		(substituted on) 90+4'
Manager:
(Spain) Roberto Martínez

Man of the Match:
Romelu Lukaku (Belgium)

Assistant referees:
Sander van Roekel (Netherlands)
Erwin Zeinstra (Netherlands)
Fourth official:
Andreas Ekberg (Sweden)
Reserve assistant referee:
Mehmet Culum (Sweden)
Video assistant referee:
Pol van Boekel (Netherlands)
Assistant video assistant referees:
Kevin Blom (Netherlands)
Benjamin Pagès (France)
François Letexier (France)

=== Russia vs Denmark ===
21 June 2021
21:00

Russia	1–4	Denmark
Dzyuba 70' (pen.)	Report	Damsgaard 38'; Poulsen 59'; Christensen 79'; Mæhle 82'

Parken Stadium, Copenhagen
Attendance: 23,644
Referee: Clément Turpin (France)

Russia	Denmark

GK	16	Matvei Safonov
CB	3	Igor Diveyev	(yellow card) 75'
CB	14	Georgi Dzhikiya
CB	13	Fyodor Kudryashov	(yellow card) 28'	(substituted off) 67'
RWB	2	Mário Fernandes
LWB	23	Daler Kuzyayev		(substituted off) 67'
CM	7	Magomed Ozdoyev		(substituted off) 61'
CM	11	Roman Zobnin
RW	15	Aleksei Miranchuk		(substituted off) 61'
LW	17	Aleksandr Golovin
CF	22	Artem Dzyuba (c)
Substitutions:
FW	9	Aleksandr Sobolev		(substituted on) 61'
MF	19	Rifat Zhemaletdinov		(substituted on) 61'
MF	26	Maksim Mukhin		(substituted on) 67'
DF	4	Vyacheslav Karavayev		(substituted on) 67'
Manager:
Stanislav Cherchesov

GK	1	Kasper Schmeichel
CB	6	Andreas Christensen
CB	4	Simon Kjær (c)
CB	3	Jannik Vestergaard
RM	18	Daniel Wass		(substituted off) 60'
CM	23	Pierre-Emile Højbjerg
CM	8	Thomas Delaney	(yellow card) 57'	(substituted off) 85'
LM	5	Joakim Mæhle
RF	9	Martin Braithwaite		(substituted off) 85'
CF	20	Yussuf Poulsen		(substituted off) 60'
LF	14	Mikkel Damsgaard		(substituted off) 72'
Substitutions:
DF	17	Jens Stryger Larsen		(substituted on) 60'
FW	12	Kasper Dolberg		(substituted on) 60'
MF	15	Christian Nørgaard		(substituted on) 72'
FW	21	Andreas Cornelius		(substituted on) 85'
MF	24	Mathias Jensen		(substituted on) 85'
Manager:
Kasper Hjulmand

Man of the Match:
Andreas Christensen (Denmark)

Assistant referees:
Nicolas Danos (France)
Cyril Gringore (France)
Fourth official:
Sandro Schärer (Switzerland)
Reserve assistant referee:
Stéphane De Almeida (Switzerland)
Video assistant referee:
François Letexier (France)
Assistant video assistant referees:
Jérôme Brisard (France)
Benjamin Pagès (France)
Alejandro Hernández Hernández (Spain)

=== Finland vs Belgium ===
21 June 2021
21:00 (22:00 UTC+3)

Finland	0–2	Belgium
	Report	Hradecky 74' (o.g.); Lukaku 81'

Krestovsky Stadium, Saint Petersburg
Attendance: 18,545
Referee: Felix Brych (Germany)

Finland	Belgium

GK	1	Lukas Hradecky
CB	4	Joona Toivio
CB	2	Paulus Arajuuri
CB	3	Daniel O'Shaughnessy
RWB	22	Jukka Raitala
LWB	18	Jere Uronen	(substituted off) 70'
CM	8	Robin Lod	(substituted off) 90+1'
CM	14	Tim Sparv (c)	(substituted off) 59'
CM	6	Glen Kamara
CF	20	Joel Pohjanpalo	(substituted off) 70'
CF	10	Teemu Pukki	(substituted off) 90+1'
Substitutions:
MF	11	Rasmus Schüller	(substituted on) 59'
MF	19	Joni Kauko	(substituted on) 70'
MF	17	Nikolai Alho	(substituted on) 70'
FW	26	Marcus Forss	(substituted on) 90+1'
MF	9	Fredrik Jensen	(substituted on) 90+1'
Manager:
Markku Kanerva

GK	1	Thibaut Courtois
CB	4	Dedryck Boyata
CB	18	Jason Denayer
CB	3	Thomas Vermaelen
RM	24	Leandro Trossard	(substituted off) 75'
CM	7	Kevin De Bruyne	(substituted off) 90+1'
CM	6	Axel Witsel
LM	22	Nacer Chadli
RF	25	Jérémy Doku	(substituted off) 75'
CF	9	Romelu Lukaku	(substituted off) 84'
LF	10	Eden Hazard (c)
Substitutions:
DF	15	Thomas Meunier	(substituted on) 75'
FW	23	Michy Batshuayi	(substituted on) 75'
FW	20	Christian Benteke	(substituted on) 84'
MF	17	Hans Vanaken	(substituted on) 90+1'
Manager:
(Spain) Roberto Martínez

Man of the Match:
Kevin De Bruyne (Belgium)

Assistant referees:
Mark Borsch (Germany)
Stefan Lupp (Germany)
Fourth official:
Davide Massa (Italy)
Reserve assistant referee:
Stefano Alassio (Italy)
Video assistant referee:
Marco Fritz (Germany)
Assistant video assistant referees:
Christian Dingert (Germany)
Christian Gittelmann (Germany)
Kevin Blom (Netherlands)

== Discipline ==
Fair play points were to be used as a tiebreaker if the head-to-head and overall records of teams were tied (and if a penalty shoot-out was not applicable as a tiebreaker). These were calculated based on yellow and red cards received in all group matches as follows:

- yellow card = 1 point
- red card as a result of two yellow cards = 3 points
- direct red card = 3 points
- yellow card followed by direct red card = 4 points

Only one of the above deductions would be applied to a player in a single match.

Team	Match 1				Match 2				Match 3				Points
Team	Booked	(yellow card) (yellow-red card)	Sent off (straight red)	(yellow card) (red card)	Booked	(yellow card) (yellow-red card)	Sent off (straight red)	(yellow card) (red card)	Booked	(yellow card) (yellow-red card)	Sent off (straight red)	(yellow card) (red card)	Points
Belgium					1								−1
Denmark					3				1				−4
Finland	2				2								−4
Russia					3				2				−5

== See also ==
- Belgium at the UEFA European Championship
- Denmark at the UEFA European Championship
- Finland at the UEFA European Championship
- Russia at the UEFA European Championship
