= Finland at the UEFA European Championship =

International football delegation

Finland have qualified once for a UEFA European Championship, the 2020 edition. They directly qualified after securing the second spot in their qualifying group, with one group match remaining; this meant they would appear in a major tournament finals for the first time in their history. Despite winning their opening game against Denmark, they exited in the group stage after losing their next two matches.

== Euro 2020 ==
=== Group stage ===
The group stage draw took place on 30 November 2019.

| Pos | Team | Pld | W | D | L | GF | GA | GD | Pts | Qualification |
|---|---|---|---|---|---|---|---|---|---|---|
| 1 | Belgium | 3 | 3 | 0 | 0 | 7 | 1 | +6 | 9 | Advance to knockout stage |
| 2 | Denmark (H) | 3 | 1 | 0 | 2 | 5 | 4 | +1 | 3 (Note: Tied on head-to-head points (3). Head-to-head goal difference: Denmark +2, Finland 0, Russia −2.) | Advance to knockout stage |
| 3 | Finland | 3 | 1 | 0 | 2 | 1 | 3 | −2 | 3 | |
| 4 | Russia (H) | 3 | 1 | 0 | 2 | 2 | 7 | −5 | 3 | |

Source: UEFA
Rules for classification: Group stage tiebreakers
(H) Hosts
Notes:
12 June 2021
18:00

| Denmark | 0–1 | Finland |
|---|---|---|
| | Report | Pohjanpalo 60' |

Parken Stadium, Copenhagen
Attendance: 13,790
Referee: Anthony Taylor (England)

16 June 2021
15:00 (16:00 UTC+3)

| Finland | 0–1 | Russia |
|---|---|---|
| | Report | Miranchuk 45+2' |

Krestovsky Stadium, Saint Petersburg
Attendance: 24,540
Referee: Danny Makkelie (Netherlands)

21 June 2021
21:00 (22:00 UTC+3)

| Finland | 0–2 | Belgium |
|---|---|---|
| | Report | Hradecky 74' (o.g.); Lukaku 81' |

Krestovsky Stadium, Saint Petersburg
Attendance: 18,545
Referee: Felix Brych (Germany)

Ranking of third-placed teams

| Pos | Grp | Team | Pld | W | D | L | GF | GA | GD | Pts | Qualification |
|---|---|---|---|---|---|---|---|---|---|---|---|
| 1 | F | Portugal | 3 | 1 | 1 | 1 | 7 | 6 | +1 | 4 | Advance to knockout stage |
| 2 | D | Czech Republic | 3 | 1 | 1 | 1 | 3 | 2 | +1 | 4 | Advance to knockout stage |
| 3 | A | Switzerland | 3 | 1 | 1 | 1 | 4 | 5 | −1 | 4 | Advance to knockout stage |
| 4 | C | Ukraine | 3 | 1 | 0 | 2 | 4 | 5 | −1 | 3 | Advance to knockout stage |
| 5 | B | Finland | 3 | 1 | 0 | 2 | 1 | 3 | −2 | 3 | |
| 6 | E | Slovakia | 3 | 1 | 0 | 2 | 2 | 7 | −5 | 3 | |

Source: UEFA
Rules for classification: 1) Points; 2) Goal difference; 3) Goals scored; 4) Wins; 5) Lower disciplinary points total; 6) European Qualifiers overall ranking.

== Overall record ==
| UEFA European Championship record | | | | | | | | | Qualification record | | | | | |
| Year | Round | Position | Pld | W | D | L | GF | GA | Pld | W | D | L | GF | GA |
|---|---|---|---|---|---|---|---|---|---|---|---|---|---|---|
| (France) 1960 | Did not enter | | | | | | | | Did not enter | | | | | |
| (Spain) 1964 | Did not enter | | | | | | | | Did not enter | | | | | |
| (Italy) 1968 | Did not qualify | | | | | | | | 6 | 0 | 2 | 4 | 5 | 12 |
| (Belgium) 1972 | Did not qualify | | | | | | | | 6 | 0 | 1 | 5 | 1 | 16 |
| (Socialist Federal Republic of Yugoslavia) 1976 | Did not qualify | | | | | | | | 6 | 0 | 1 | 5 | 3 | 13 |
| (Italy) 1980 | Did not qualify | | | | | | | | 6 | 2 | 2 | 2 | 10 | 15 |
| (France) 1984 | Did not qualify | | | | | | | | 6 | 0 | 1 | 5 | 3 | 14 |
| (West Germany) 1988 | Did not qualify | | | | | | | | 6 | 1 | 1 | 4 | 4 | 10 |
| (Sweden) 1992 | Did not qualify | | | | | | | | 8 | 1 | 4 | 3 | 5 | 8 |
| (England) 1996 | Did not qualify | | | | | | | | 10 | 5 | 0 | 5 | 18 | 18 |
| (Belgium) (Netherlands) 2000 | Did not qualify | | | | | | | | 8 | 3 | 1 | 4 | 13 | 13 |
| (Portugal) 2004 | Did not qualify | | | | | | | | 8 | 3 | 1 | 4 | 9 | 10 |
| (Austria) (Switzerland) 2008 | Did not qualify | | | | | | | | 14 | 6 | 6 | 2 | 13 | 7 |
| (Poland) (Ukraine) 2012 | Did not qualify | | | | | | | | 10 | 3 | 1 | 6 | 16 | 16 |
| (France) 2016 | Did not qualify | | | | | | | | 10 | 3 | 3 | 4 | 9 | 10 |
| (Europe) 2020 | Group stage | 17th | 3 | 1 | 0 | 2 | 1 | 3 | 10 | 6 | 0 | 4 | 16 | 10 |
| (Germany) 2024 | Did not qualify | | | | | | | | 11 | 6 | 0 | 5 | 19 | 14 |
| (United Kingdom) (Republic of Ireland) 2028 | To be determined | | | | | | | | To be determined | | | | | |
| (Italy) (Turkey) 2032 | To be determined | | | | | | | | To be determined | | | | | |
| Total | Group stage | 1/17 | 3 | 1 | 0 | 2 | 1 | 3 | 125 | 39 | 24 | 62 | 144 | 186 |
