= Niklas Dams =

German footballer

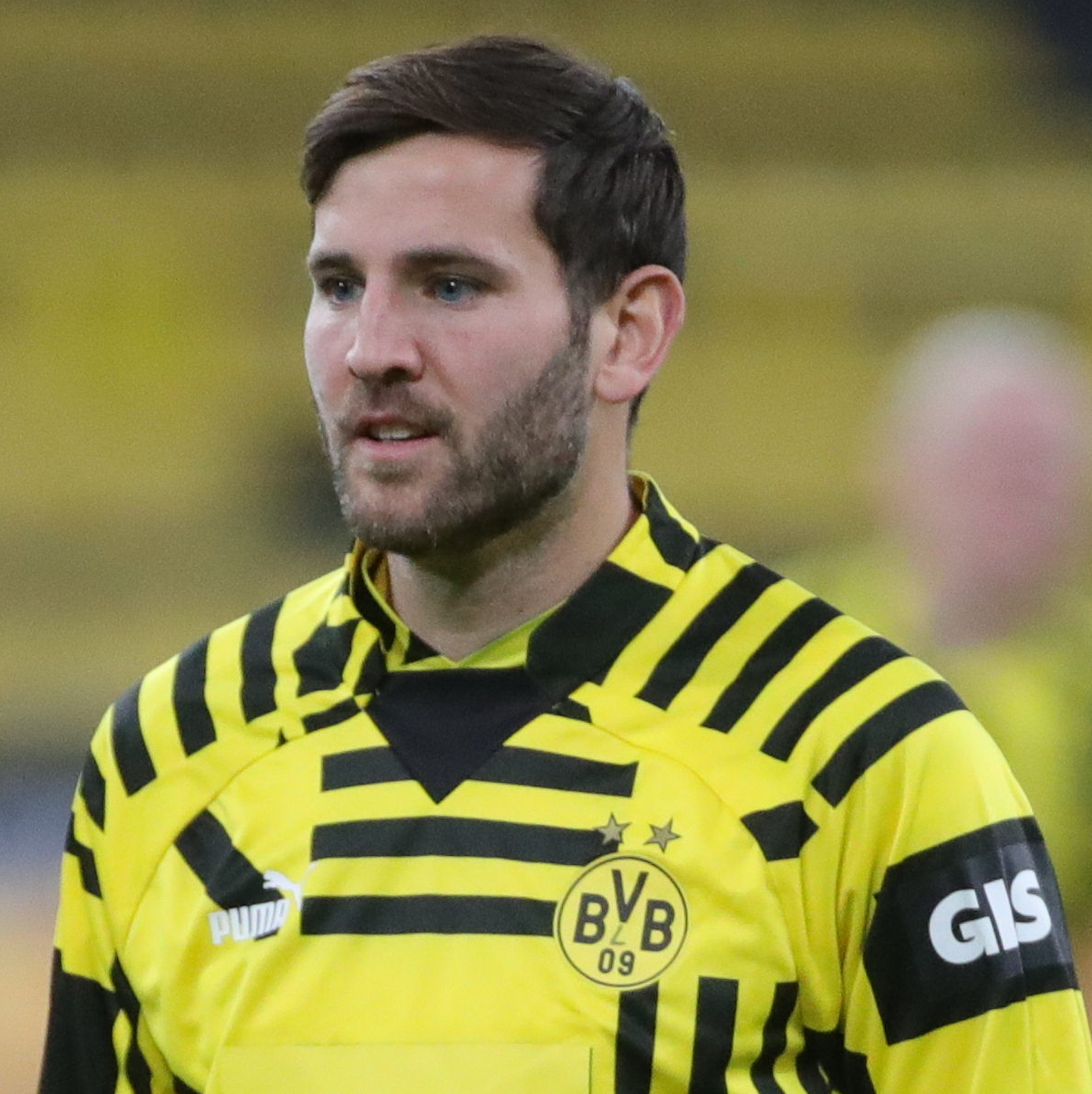
- Dams with Borussia Dortmund II in 2022

Personal information
- Date of birth: 28 May 1990 (age 36)
- Place of birth: Düsseldorf, Germany
- Height: 1.85 m (6 ft 1 in)
- Position: Defender

Team information
- Current team: Wuppertaler SV
- Number: 30

Youth career
- ASV Tiefenbroich
- Fortuna Düsseldorf
- –2009: Borussia Mönchengladbach

Senior career*
Years	Team	Apps	(Gls)
2009–2013	Borussia Mönchengladbach II	102	(7)
2013–2015	Servette	58	(0)
2015–2020	Wehen Wiesbaden	134	(6)
2020–2023	Borussia Dortmund II	101	(5)
2023–	Wuppertaler SV	41	(2)
- * Club domestic league appearances and goals as of 1 January 2025

Niklas Dams (born 28 May 1990) is a German footballer who plays as a defender for Wuppertaler SV.
