= Falko Michel =

German association football player

Personal information
- Date of birth: 14 January 2001 (age 25)
- Place of birth: Breisach, Germany
- Height: 1.86 m (6 ft 1 in)
- Position: Midfielder

Team information
- Current team: 1. FC Magdeburg
- Number: 21

Youth career
- –2017: SFE Freiburg
- 2017–2020: SC Freiburg

Senior career*
Years	Team	Apps	(Gls)
2020–2022	VfB Stuttgart II	59	(4)
2022–2024	Borussia Dortmund II	63	(7)
2024–	1. FC Magdeburg	58	(2)
- * Club domestic league appearances and goals as of 23:35, 9 October 2026 (UTC)

Falko Michel (born 14 January 2001) is a German professional footballer who plays as a midfielder for 2. Bundesliga club 1. FC Magdeburg.

== Club career ==
Michel was born in Breisach and was raised in Achkarren. He played youth football with SFE Freiburg until 2017, and then SC Freiburg from 2017 to 2020. He made 59 appearances, scoring four goals, for VfB Stuttgart II in the Regionalliga Südwest across the 2020–21 and 2021–22 seasons, and made 63 appearances, scoring 7 goals for Borussia Dortmund II in the 3. Liga across the 2022–23 and 2023–24 seasons.

Michel signed for 2. Bundesliga club 1. FC Magdeburg in May 2024.

He signed a new contract with Magdeburg in June 2026.

== Style of play ==
Upon signing for Magdeburg, manager Christian Titz described Michel as a fast and versatile player who can be used in multiple attacking positions.
