= Ted Tattermusch =

German footballer

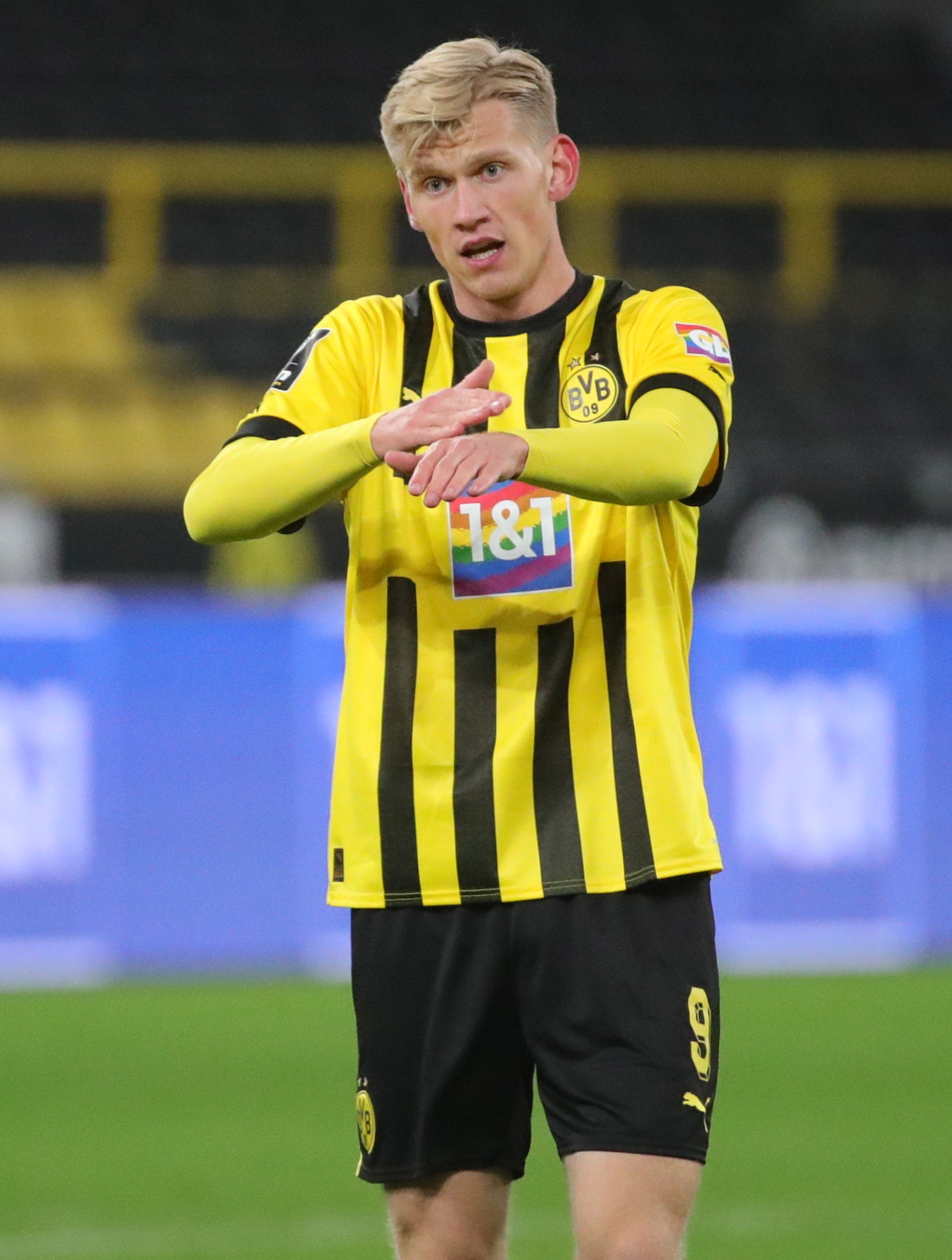
- Ted Tattermusch (2022)

Personal information
- Full name: Ted-Jonathan Tattermusch
- Date of birth: 8 May 2001 (age 25)
- Place of birth: Meppen, Germany
- Height: 1.94 m (6 ft 4 in)
- Position: Left winger

Team information
- Current team: VSG Altglienicke
- Number: 18

Youth career
- –2012: SV Teglingen
- 2012–2019: SV Meppen

Senior career*
Years	Team	Apps	(Gls)
2019–2021	SV Meppen	14	(1)
2021–2024	Borussia Dortmund II	82	(2)
2024–2025	Carl Zeiss Jena	29	(12)
2025–2026	Energie Cottbus	21	(0)
2026–	VSG Altglienicke	1	(0)
- * Club domestic league appearances and goals as of 28 August 2026

Ted-Jonathan Tattermusch (born 8 May 2001) is a German professional footballer who plays as a left winger for Regionalliga Nordost club VSG Altglienicke.

== Career ==
Tattermusch made his professional debut for SV Meppen in the 3. Liga on 31 July 2019, coming on as a substitute in the 87th minute for Deniz Undav in the 4–2 away win against Chemnitzer FC.

On 3 September 2024, Tattermusch signed with Carl Zeiss Jena until the end of the 2024–25 season.

On 12 June 2025, Tattermusch joined Energie Cottbus.

== Personal life ==
Tattermusch is the son of former Bundesliga footballer Reinhold Tattermusch, who also played for Meppen during his career.
