= 2021–22 TSV Havelse season =

TSV Havelse
2021–22 season
- President: Manfred Hörnschemeyer
- Manager: Rüdiger Ziehl
- Stadium: HDI-Arena
- 3. Liga: 19th (relegated)
- Lower Saxony Cup: First round
- Top goalscorer: League: Kianz Froese; Yannik Jaeschke; Fynn Lakenmacher (5 goals each); All: Kianz Froese; Yannik Jaeschke; Fynn Lakenmacher (5 goals each)
- Highest home attendance: 4,591; Havelse v Braunschweig
- Lowest home attendance: 210; Havelse v Freiburg
- Average home league attendance: 1,151
- Biggest win: Havelse 3–0 Meppen
- Biggest defeat: Mannheim 7–0 Havelse
Home colours	Away colours	Third colours

The 2021–22 TSV Havelse season was the 110th season in the football club's history and first in the 3. Liga, the third flight of German football. TSV Havelse will also participate in this season's edition of the Lower Saxony Cup. This is the first season for Havelse in the HDI-Arena, located in Hanover, Lower Saxony, Germany, since their home stadium, the Wilhelm-Langrehr-Stadion in Garbsen, did not meet 3. Liga standards.

== Players ==
=== Squad information ===
Note: Flags indicate national team as defined under FIFA eligibility rules; some limited exceptions apply. Players may hold more than one non-FIFA nationality.

No.	Pos.	Nation	Player
1	GK	(Germany) GER	Norman Quindt
2	DF	(Germany) GER	Erik Henschel
3	DF	(Germany) GER	Marco Schleef
5	DF	(Germany) GER	Jonas Sonnenberg
6	DF	(Germany) GER	Nils Piwernetz
7	MF	(Germany) GER	Vico Meien
8	MF	(Germany) GER	Julius Langfeld
9	FW	(Germany) GER	Julius Düker
10	MF	(Germany) GER	Deniz Cicek
11	FW	(Germany) GER	Yannik Jaeschke
12	GK	(Germany) GER	Tobias Stirl
13	DF	(Germany) GER	Niklas Teichgräber
14	FW	(Germany) GER	Leon Damer
15	MF	(Canada) CAN	Kianz Froese

No.	Pos.	Nation	Player
16	FW	(Germany) GER	Torben Engelking
17	FW	(Germany) GER	Ilir Qela
18	FW	(Germany) GER	Fynn Lakenmacher
19	DF	(Germany) GER	Fynn Arkenberg
20	DF	(Germany) GER	Tobias Fölster (captain)
23	FW	(Germany) GER	Linus Meyer
24	MF	(Germany) GER	Noah Plume
25	MF	(Germany) GER	Oliver Daedlow (on loan from Hansa Rostock)
26	DF	(Germany) GER	Niklas Tasky
27	MF	(Switzerland) SUI	Leonardo Gubinelli (on loan from Basel U21)
28	MF	(Germany) GER	Julian Rufidis
35	GK	(Germany) GER	Alexander Dlugaiczyk
39	DF	(Germany) GER	Florian Riedel

=== Transfers ===
==== In ====
No.	Pos	Player	From	Type	Window	Ends	Fee	Source
6	DF	(Germany) Nils Piwernetz	(Germany) 1. FC Nürnberg II	Transfer	Summer	30 June 2022	Free	
9	FW	(Germany) Julius Düker	(Germany) SV Meppen	Transfer	Summer	30 June 2023	Free	
12	GK	(Germany) Tobias Stirl	(Germany) VfL Wolfsburg II	Transfer	Summer	30 June 2022	Free	
15	MF	(Canada) Kianz Froese	(Germany) 1. FC Saarbrücken	Transfer	Summer	30 June 2022	Free	
19	DF	(Germany) Fynn Arkenberg	(Germany) SV Rödinghausen	Transfer	Summer	30 June 2023	Free	
23	FW	(Germany) Linus Meyer	(Germany) VSG Altglienicke	Transfer	Summer	30 June 2023	Free	
25	MF	(Germany) Oliver Daedlow	(Germany) Hansa Rostock	Loan	Summer	30 June 2022	Free	
39	DF	(Germany) Florian Riedel	(Germany) VfB Lübeck	Transfer	Summer	30 June 2022	Free	
27	MF	(Switzerland) Leonardo Gubinelli	(Switzerland) Basel U21	Loan	Winter	30 June 2022	Free	

==== Out ====
No.	Pos	Player	To	Type	Window	Fee	Source
1	GK	(Germany) Alexander Rehberg	Retirement	End of contract	Summer	–	
6	MF	(Germany) Max Kummer	(Germany) Hannoverscher SC	End of contract	Summer	–	
12	GK	(Germany) Antonio Brandt	(Germany) VfV Hildesheim	End of contract	Summer	–	
14	FW	(Germany) Jannis Neugebauer	(Germany) TSV Krähenwinkel/Kaltenweide	Contract terminated	Summer	–	
15	MF	(Germany) Nikos Elfert	(Germany) Germania Egestorf/Langreder	Contract terminated	Summer	–	
27	DF	(Germany) Torge Bremer	Free agent	End of contract	Summer	–	
33	FW	(Germany) Kevin Schumacher	(Germany) Hansa Rostock	End of contract	Summer	–	
21	DF	(Germany) Denis Kina	Free agent	Contract terminated	Winter	–	

== Friendly matches ==
Win Draw Loss

6 July 2021 Friendly	TSV Havelse (Germany)	4–0	(Germany) SV Ramlingen/Ehlershausen	Garbsen
18:45 CEST (UTC+2)	Düker 4'; Meien 16'; Jaeschke 43'; Plume 51'	Report		Stadium: Wilhelm-Langrehr-Stadion; Attendance: 0

10 July 2021 Friendly	TSV Havelse (Germany)	3–2	(Germany) Rot Weiss Ahlen	Garbsen
14:00 CEST (UTC+2)	Meyer 44'; Lakenmacher 63', 65'	Report	Kahlert 61'; Anan 71'	Stadium: Wilhelm-Langrehr-Stadion

17 July 2021 Friendly	TSV Havelse (Germany)	1–1	(Germany) Energie Cottbus	Garbsen
13:30 CEST (UTC+2)	Plume 37'	Report	Hildebrandt 83' (pen.)	Stadium: Wilhelm-Langrehr-Stadion; Attendance: 400; Referee: Patrick Herbach

31 July 2021 Friendly	TSV Havelse (Germany)	1–2	(Germany) VfB Oldenburg	Garbsen
14:00 CEST (UTC+2)	Plume 16'	Report	Łukowicz 79'; Schmidt 86'	Stadium: Wilhelm-Langrehr-Stadion; Attendance: 60

8 October 2021 Friendly	TSV Havelse (Germany)	0–1	(Germany) Hannover 96	Garbsen
18:30 CEST (UTC+2)		Report	Frantz 61'	Stadium: Wilhelm-Langrehr-Stadion; Attendance: 1,502

5 January 2022 Friendly	Holstein Kiel (Germany)	5–0	(Germany) TSV Havelse	Kiel
14:00 CET (UTC+1)	Pichler 6', 24'; Mees 14'; Skrzybski 15'; Stöcker 81'	Report		Stadium: Citti Fußball Park; Attendance: 0

2 March 2022 Friendly	Hannover 96 II (Germany)	1–1	(Germany) TSV Havelse	Hanover
11:00 CET (UTC+1)	Gudra 47'	Report	Gubinelli 42'	Stadium: NLZ Hannover 96 Platz 2 Attendance: 0 Referee: Julian Meckfessel

24 March 2022 Friendly	SC Paderborn (Germany)	2–3	(Germany) TSV Havelse	Paderborn
12:00 CET (UTC+1)	Stiepermann 5'; Çuni 19'	Report	Froese 33'; Lakenmacher 45'; Qela 67'	Stadium: Benteler-Arena; Attendance: 0

== Competitions ==
Win Draw Loss Void

=== Overview ===
Competition	First match	Last match	Starting round	Final position	Record							
Competition	First match	Last match	Starting round	Final position	Pld	W	D	L	GF	GA	GD	Win %
3. Liga	24 July 2021	14 May 2022	Matchday 1	19th	36	5	8	23	28	71	−43	13.89
Lower Saxony Cup	18 August 2021	18 August 2021	First round	First round	1	0	1	0	0	0	+0	0.00
Total					37	5	9	23	28	71	−43	13.51

Source: Competitions

=== 3. Liga ===
==== League table ====
Pos	Team	Pld	W	D	L	GF	GA	GD	Pts	Promotion, qualification or relegation
16	SC Verl	36	10	10	16	56	66	−10	40	
17	Viktoria Berlin (R)	36	10	7	19	44	62	−18	37	Relegation to Regionalliga
18	Würzburger Kickers (R)	36	7	9	20	34	59	−25	30	Relegation to Regionalliga
19	TSV Havelse (R)	36	5	8	23	28	71	−43	23	Relegation to Regionalliga
20	Türkgücü München (Note: Türkgücü München were deducted eleven points, nine after they filed for insolvency and two more for condition mistakes. On 24 March 2022, after the 31st matchday, Türkgücü München ceased to play for financial reasons. All their results were expunged. At the time, they were ranked 20th with 8 wins, 8 draws, 15 losses, 30–47 goals, and 21 points (after the deduction).) (R)	0	0	0	0	0	0	0	0	Results expunged

Source: DFB
Rules for classification: 1) Points; 2) Goal difference; 3) Goals scored; 4) Head-to-head results; 5) Head-to-head away goals scored; 6) Away goals scored; 7) Play-off.
(R) Relegated

==== Results summary ====
Overall								Home						Away					
Pld	W	D	L	GF	GA	GD	Pts	W	D	L	GF	GA	GD	W	D	L	GF	GA	GD
36	5	8	23	28	71	−43	23	4	1	13	14	34	−20	1	7	10	14	37	−23

Source: DFB

==== Results by round ====
Round	1	2	3	4	5	6	7	8	9	10	11	12	13	14	15	16	17	18	19	20	21	22	23	24	25	26	27	28	29	30	31	32	33	34	35	36	37	38
Ground	H	A	H	A	H	A	H	A	H	A	H	A	H	A	H	A	H	A	H	A	H	A	H	A	H	A	H	A	H	A	H	A	H	A	H	A	H	A
Result	L	L	L	L	V	L	L	D	W	W	L	L	L	L	W	D	L	D	L	D	L	D	L	V	W	L	L	D	D	L	L	L	L	D	W	L	L	L
Position	16	20	20	20	20	20	20	19	19	18	19	19	19	19	19	19	19	19	19	19	19	19	19	19	18	18	19	19	19	19	19	19	19	19	19	19	19	19

Source: DFB
A = Away; H = Home; W = Win; D = Draw; L = Loss; V = Void

==== Matches ====
24 July 2021 1	TSV Havelse	0–1	1. FC Saarbrücken	Hanover
14:00 CEST (UTC+2)		Report	Gouras 19'	Stadium: HDI-Arena; Attendance: 2,230; Referee: Alexander Sather

8 August 2021 2	MSV Duisburg	3–0	TSV Havelse	Duisburg
13:00 CEST (UTC+2)	Ademi 25'; Stoppelkamp 66' (pen.); Pusch 68'	Report		Stadium: Schauinsland-Reisen-Arena; Attendance: 7,661; Referee: Patrick Kessel
Note: The match was originally scheduled for 30 July 2021, 19:00 CEST, but was postponed after MSV Duisburg was quarantined due to COVID-19 cases.

14 August 2021 3	TSV Havelse	1–3	1. FC Magdeburg	Hanover
14:00 CEST (UTC+2)	Jaeschke 48'	Report	Krempicki 37'; Atik 85' (pen.); Brünker 90+3' (pen.)	Stadium: HDI-Arena; Attendance: 3,139; Referee: Robin Braun

22 August 2021 4	Wehen Wiesbaden	2–1	TSV Havelse	Wiesbaden
14:00 CEST (UTC+2)	Nilsson 66', 90+3' (pen.)	Report	Jaeschke 82'	Stadium: BRITA-Arena; Attendance: 1,337; Referee: Eric Müller

25 August 2021 5	TSV Havelse	0–3	Türkgücü München	Hanover
19:00 CEST (UTC+2)		Report	Slišković 6'; Kuhn 22'; Vrenezi 80'	Stadium: HDI-Arena; Attendance: 782; Referee: Max Burda
Note: All of Türkgücü München's results were expunged.

30 August 2021 6	SV Meppen	1–0	TSV Havelse	Meppen
19:00 CEST (UTC+2)	Krüger 74'	Report		Stadium: Hänsch-Arena; Attendance: 6,107; Referee: Wolfgang Haslberger

5 September 2021 7	TSV Havelse	0–1	Borussia Dortmund II	Hanover
14:00 CEST (UTC+2)		Report	Tachie 70'	Stadium: HDI-Arena; Attendance: 1,002; Referee: Patrick Schwengers

11 September 2021 8	Würzburger Kickers	0–0	TSV Havelse	Würzburg
14:00 CEST (UTC+2)		Report		Stadium: flyeralarm Arena; Attendance: 3,676; Referee: Christian Ballweg

17 September 2021 9	TSV Havelse	1–0	Viktoria Köln	Hanover
19:00 CEST (UTC+2)	Froese 33' (pen.)	Report		Stadium: HDI-Arena; Attendance: 527; Referee: Nicolas Winter

27 September 2021 10	Viktoria Berlin	3–4	TSV Havelse	Berlin
19:00 CEST (UTC+2)	Kapp 18'; Jopek 36'; Menz 60'	Report	Froese 27'; Düker 57'; Langfeld 69'; Meyer 80'	Stadium: Friedrich-Ludwig-Jahn-Stadion; Attendance: 1,500; Referee: Robert Kampka

2 October 2021 11	TSV Havelse	0–6	1. FC Kaiserslautern	Hanover
14:00 CEST (UTC+2)		Report	Ritter 11'; Kraus 17'; Wunderlich 30'; Hercher 44'; Hanslik 48', 56'	Stadium: HDI-Arena; Attendance: 1,986; Referee: Florian Lechner

18 October 2021 12	SC Verl	5–3	TSV Havelse	Lotte
19:00 CEST (UTC+2)	Putaro 12', 21'; Petkov 15'; Schmitt 59'; Schwermann 71'	Report	Fölster 10', 61'; Damer 50'	Stadium: Stadion am Lotter Kreuz; Attendance: 576; Referee: Mitja Stegemann

24 October 2021 13	TSV Havelse	0–4	Eintracht Braunschweig	Hanover
14:00 CEST (UTC+2)		Report	Consbruch 25'; Schultz 66'; Lauberbach 69'; Müller 88'	Stadium: HDI-Arena; Attendance: 4,591; Referee: Martin Petersen

6 November 2021 15	TSV Havelse	2–1	Hallescher FC	Hanover
14:00 CET (UTC+1)	Lakenmacher 8', 18'	Report	Eberwein 45+1'	Stadium: HDI-Arena; Attendance: 533; Referee: Riem Hussein

13 November 2021 14	FSV Zwickau	2–0	TSV Havelse	Zwickau
14:00 CET (UTC+1)	Baumann 49'; Schikora 57'	Report		Stadium: GGZ-Arena; Attendance: 2,968; Referee: Mario Hildenbrand
Note: The match was originally scheduled for 30 October 2021, 14:00 CEST, but was postponed after FSV Zwickau was quarantined due to COVID-19 cases.

20 November 2021 16	SC Freiburg II	0–0	TSV Havelse	Freiburg im Breisgau
14:00 CET (UTC+1)		Report		Stadium: Dreisamstadion; Attendance: 950; Referee: Tom Bauer

27 November 2021 17	TSV Havelse	2–3	1860 Munich	Hanover
14:00 CET (UTC+1)	Jaeschke 51', 85'	Report	Fölster 8' (o.g.); Bär 32'; Biankadi 56'	Stadium: HDI-Arena; Attendance: 1,343; Referee: Patrick Schwengers

5 December 2021 18	VfL Osnabrück	0–0	TSV Havelse	Osnabrück
14:00 CET (UTC+1)		Report		Stadium: Stadion an der Bremer Brücke; Attendance: 6,098; Referee: Steven Greif

11 December 2021 19	TSV Havelse	1–2	Waldhof Mannheim	Hanover
14:00 CET (UTC+1)	Plume 47'	Report	Costly 5'; Schnatterer 88'	Stadium: HDI-Arena; Attendance: 809; Referee: Robin Braun

18 December 2021 20	1. FC Saarbrücken	2–2	TSV Havelse	Saarbrücken
14:00 CET (UTC+1)	Jänicke 34'; Günther-Schmidt 79'	Report	Lakenmacher 62', 69'	Stadium: Ludwigsparkstadion; Attendance: 4,800; Referee: Marc-Philip Eckermann

14 January 2022 21	TSV Havelse	0–1	MSV Duisburg	Hanover
19:00 CET (UTC+1)		Report	Stoppelkamp 55'	Stadium: HDI-Arena; Attendance: 386; Referee: Mario Hildenbrand

23 January 2022 22	1. FC Magdeburg	1–1	TSV Havelse	Magdeburg
15:00 CET (UTC+1)	Bell Bell 11'	Report	Damer 69'	Stadium: MDCC-Arena; Attendance: 13,385; Referee: Timo Gerach

26 January 2022 23	TSV Havelse	0–1	Wehen Wiesbaden	Hanover
19:00 CET (UTC+1)		Report	Lankford 17'	Stadium: HDI-Arena; Attendance: 222; Referee: Steven Greif

29 January 2022 24	Türkgücü München	0–1	TSV Havelse	Munich
14:00 CET (UTC+1)		Report	Jaeschke 53'	Stadium: Olympiastadion; Attendance: 600; Referee: Mitja Stegemann
Note: All of Türkgücü München's results were expunged.

5 February 2022 25	TSV Havelse	3–0	SV Meppen	Hanover
14:00 CET (UTC+1)	Damer 35'; Froese 50', 74' (pen.)	Report		Stadium: HDI-Arena; Attendance: 500; Referee: Florian Lechner

12 February 2022 26	Borussia Dortmund II	1–0	TSV Havelse	Dortmund
14:00 CET (UTC+1)	Tachie 72'	Report		Stadium: Stadion Rote Erde; Attendance: 750; Referee: Eric Müller

20 February 2022 27	TSV Havelse	1–3	Würzburger Kickers	Hanover
13:00 CET (UTC+1)	Arkenberg 73'	Report	Strohdiek 25'; Herrmann 71'; Sané 84' (pen.)	Stadium: HDI-Arena; Attendance: 487; Referee: Max Burda

25 February 2022 28	Viktoria Köln	0–0	TSV Havelse	Cologne
19:00 CET (UTC+1)		Report		Stadium: Sportpark Höhenberg; Attendance: 2,469; Referee: Marc-Philip Eckermann

7 March 2022 29	TSV Havelse	1–1	Viktoria Berlin	Hanover
19:00 CET (UTC+1)	Gubinelli 21'	Report	Gunte 10'	Stadium: HDI-Arena; Attendance: 443; Referee: Konrad Oldhafer

12 March 2022 30	1. FC Kaiserslautern	3–0	TSV Havelse	Kaiserslautern
14:00 CET (UTC+1)	Boyd 12'; Hercher 53'; Ritter 73'	Report		Stadium: Fritz-Walter-Stadion; Attendance: 20,650; Referee: Patrick Ittrich

19 March 2022 31	TSV Havelse	1–3	SC Verl	Hanover
14:00 CET (UTC+1)	Engelking 81'	Report	Petkov 12'; Putaro 34' (pen.); Ochojski 66'	Stadium: HDI-Arena; Attendance: 402; Referee: Patrick Kessel

2 April 2022 32	Eintracht Braunschweig	3–2	TSV Havelse	Braunschweig
14:00 CEST (UTC+2)	Fölster 34' (o.g.), 64' (o.g.); Marx 90+2'	Report	Lakenmacher 44'; Qela 90'	Stadium: Eintracht-Stadion; Attendance: 13,000; Referee: Tobias Stieler

10 April 2022 33	TSV Havelse	0–3	FSV Zwickau	Hanover
14:00 CEST (UTC+2)		Report	Lokotsch 20'; Baumann 65'; Nkansah 82'	Stadium: HDI-Arena; Attendance: 505; Referee: Frank Willenborg

16 April 2022 34	Hallescher FC	1–1	TSV Havelse	Halle
14:00 CEST (UTC+2)	Huth 24'	Report	Arkenberg 32'	Stadium: Leuna Chemie Stadion; Attendance: 5,160; Referee: Patrick Glaser

23 April 2022 35	TSV Havelse	1–0	SC Freiburg II	Hanover
14:00 CEST (UTC+2)	Froese 28'	Report		Stadium: HDI-Arena; Attendance: 210; Referee: Mario Hildenbrand

30 April 2022 36	1860 Munich	1–0	TSV Havelse	Munich
14:00 CEST (UTC+2)	Belkahia 51'; Bär 81', 89'	Report		Stadium: Grünwalder Stadion; Attendance: 15,000; Referee: Christian Ballweg

7 May 2022 37	TSV Havelse	0–1	VfL Osnabrück	Hanover
14:00 CEST (UTC+2)		Report	Gugganig 81'	Stadium: HDI-Arena; Attendance: 1,769; Referee: Patrick Hanslbauer

14 May 2022 38	Waldhof Mannheim	7–0	TSV Havelse	Mannheim
13:30 CEST (UTC+2)	Schnatterer 2'; Verlaat 21'; Rossipal 45' (pen.); Kother 57', 83'; Sohm 61'; Wagner 77'	Report		Stadium: Carl-Benz-Stadion; Attendance: 7,000; Referee: Christian Dingert

=== Lower Saxony Cup ===
18 August 2021 First round	SSV Jeddeloh	0–0 (3–2 p)	TSV Havelse	Edewecht
19:00 CEST (UTC+2)		Report		Stadium: 53acht-Arena; Referee: Lukas Benen
	Penalties
	Ziga (penalty scored); Otto (penalty scored); Hahn (penalty scored); unknown (penalty missed)		(penalty missed) Froese; (penalty scored) Jaeschke; (penalty scored) Düker; (penalty missed) Kina; (penalty missed) Fölster
Note: The match was originally scheduled for 7 August 2021, 15:00 CEST, but was postponed to accommodate for the postponement of the 3. Liga match against MSV Duisburg.

== Statistics ==
=== Appearances and goals ===
No.	Pos	Player	3. Liga		Lower Saxony Cup		Total	
No.	Pos	Player	Apps	Goals	Apps	Goals	Apps	Goals
1	GK	(Germany) Norman Quindt	37	0	0	0	37	0
2	DF	(Germany) Erik Henschel	0	0	0	0	0	0
3	DF	(Germany) Marco Schleef	0+2	0	0	0	2	0
5	DF	(Germany) Jonas Sonnenberg	0+3	0	0	0	3	0
6	DF	(Germany) Nils Piwernetz	7+8	0	1	0	16	0
7	MF	(Germany) Vico Meien	2+8	0	1	0	11	0
8	FW	(Germany) Julius Langfeld	17+8	1	0+1	0	26	1
9	FW	(Germany) Julius Düker	28+2	1	1	0	31	1
10	MF	(Germany) Deniz Cicek	2+8	0	0	0	10	0
11	FW	(Germany) Yannik Jaeschke	22+8	5	0+1	0	31	5
12	GK	(Germany) Tobias Stirl	1	0	1	0	2	0
13	DF	(Germany) Niklas Teichgräber	36	0	1	0	37	0
14	FW	(Germany) Leon Damer	26+5	3	0	0	31	3
15	MF	(Canada) Kianz Froese	31+1	5	0+1	0	33	5
16	FW	(Germany) Torben Engelking	0+10	1	0	0	10	1
17	FW	(Germany) Ilir Qela	0+2	1	0	0	2	1
18	FW	(Germany) Fynn Lakenmacher	34+2	5	1	0	37	5
19	DF	(Germany) Fynn Arkenberg	30+1	2	0	0	31	2
20	DF	(Germany) Tobias Fölster	32	2	1	0	33	2
21	DF	(Germany) Denis Kina	0+3	0	1	0	4	0
23	FW	(Germany) Linus Meyer	11+11	1	0	0	22	1
24	MF	(Germany) Noah Plume	19+16	1	1	0	36	1
25	MF	(Germany) Oliver Daedlow	21+2	0	0	0	23	0
26	DF	(Germany) Niklas Tasky	17+7	0	0+1	0	25	0
27	MF	(Switzerland) Leonardo Gubinelli	9+5	1	0	0	14	1
28	MF	(Germany) Julian Rufidis	1+8	0	1	0	10	0
35	GK	(Germany) Alexander Dlugaiczyk	0+1	0	0	0	1	0
39	DF	(Germany) Florian Riedel	35+1	0	1	0	37	0

=== Goalscorers ===
Rank	No.	Pos	Name	3. Liga	Lower Saxony Cup	Total
1	11	FW	(Germany) Yannik Jaeschke	5	0	5
1	15	MF	(Canada) Kianz Froese	5	0	5
1	18	FW	(Germany) Fynn Lakenmacher	5	0	5
4	14	FW	(Germany) Leon Damer	3	0	3
5	19	DF	(Germany) Fynn Arkenberg	2	0	2
5	20	DF	(Germany) Tobias Fölster	2	0	2
7	8	FW	(Germany) Julius Langfeld	1	0	1
7	9	FW	(Germany) Julius Düker	1	0	1
7	16	FW	(Germany) Torben Engelking	1	0	1
7	17	FW	(Germany) Ilir Qela	1	0	1
7	23	FW	(Germany) Linus Meyer	1	0	1
7	24	MF	(Germany) Noah Plume	1	0	1
7	27	MF	(Switzerland) Leonardo Gubinelli	1	0	1
Total				29	0	29

=== Clean sheets ===
Rank	No.	Pos	Name	3. Liga	Lower Saxony Cup	Total
1	1	GK	(Germany) Norman Quindt	8	0	8
2	12	GK	(Germany) Tobias Stirl	0	1	1
Total				8	1	9

=== Disciplinary record ===
Rank	No.	Pos	Name	3. Liga			Lower Saxony Cup			Total		
Rank	No.	Pos	Name	Booked	(yellow card) (yellow-red card)	Sent off (straight red)	Booked	(yellow card) (yellow-red card)	Sent off (straight red)	Booked	(yellow card) (yellow-red card)	Sent off (straight red)
1	11	FW	(Germany) Yannik Jaeschke	4	0	1	0	0	0	4	0	1
2	20	DF	(Germany) Tobias Fölster	2	0	1	1	0	0	3	0	1
2	24	MF	(Germany) Noah Plume	7	0	0	1	0	0	8	0	0
4	9	FW	(Germany) Julius Düker	7	0	0	0	0	0	7	0	0
4	13	DF	(Germany) Niklas Teichgräber	6	0	0	1	0	0	7	0	0
6	15	DF	(Canada) Kianz Froese	6	0	0	0	0	0	6	0	0
6	19	DF	(Germany) Fynn Arkenberg	6	0	0	0	0	0	6	0	0
8	8	FW	(Germany) Julius Langfeld	5	0	0	0	0	0	5	0	0
8	18	FW	(Germany) Fynn Lakenmacher	2	1	0	0	0	0	2	1	0
8	26	DF	(Germany) Niklas Tasky	5	0	0	0	0	0	5	0	0
11	1	GK	(Germany) Norman Quindt	3	0	0	0	0	0	3	0	0
11	23	FW	(Germany) Linus Meyer	3	0	0	0	0	0	3	0	0
11	39	DF	(Germany) Florian Riedel	3	0	0	0	0	0	3	0	0
14	6	DF	(Germany) Nils Piwernetz	1	0	0	1	0	0	2	0	0
14	7	MF	(Germany) Vico Meien	1	0	0	1	0	0	2	0	0
14	14	FW	(Germany) Leon Damer	2	0	0	0	0	0	2	0	0
14	25	MF	(Germany) Oliver Daedlow	2	0	0	0	0	0	2	0	0
18	5	DF	(Germany) Jonas Sonnenberg	1	0	0	0	0	0	1	0	0
18	10	MF	(Germany) Deniz Cicek	1	0	0	0	0	0	1	0	0
18	27	MF	(Switzerland) Leonardo Gubinelli	1	0	0	0	0	0	1	0	0
18	28	MF	(Germany) Julian Rufidis	1	0	0	0	0	0	1	0	0
Total				69	1	2	5	0	0	74	1	2
