= 2025–26 TSV Havelse season =

TSV Havelse
2025–26 season
- President: Manfred Hörnschemeyer
- Manager: Samir Ferchichi
- Stadium: Eilenriedestadion; Heinz von Heiden Arena
- 3. Liga: 17th
- Lower Saxony Cup: Semi-finals
- Top goalscorer: League: Nassim Boujellab (7); All: Marko Ilic (8)
- Highest home attendance: 6,712; Havelse v Rostock
- Lowest home attendance: 532; Havelse v Stuttgart
- Average home league attendance: 1,785
- Biggest win: Havelse 4–0 Hoffenheim
- Biggest defeat: Havelse 0–5 Munich; Aachen 6–1 Havelse
Home colours	Away colours	Third colours

The 2025–26 TSV Havelse season was the 114th season in the football club's history and second in the 3. Liga, the third flight of German football. TSV Havelse also participated in this season's edition of the Lower Saxony Cup. This was the first season for Havelse in the Eilenriedestadion, located in Hanover, Lower Saxony, Germany, since their home stadium, the Wilhelm-Langrehr-Stadion in Garbsen, did not meet 3. Liga standards. For high-risk matches, they moved to the Heinz von Heiden Arena, where the team played their 3. Liga matches in the 2021–22 season.

The club was originally relegated to the Regionalliga Nord at the end of the season, but 1860 Munich was administratively relegated after not receiving a 3. Liga license, allowing Havelse to remain in the 3. Liga.

== Players ==
=== Squad information ===
As of 3 February 2026

Note: Flags indicate national team as defined under FIFA eligibility rules; some limited exceptions apply. Players may hold more than one non-FIFA nationality.

No.	Pos.	Nation	Player
1	GK	GER	Tom Opitz
3	DF	GER	Marco Schleef
4	DF	KOS	Besfort Kolgeci
5	DF	GER	Dominic Minz
6	DF	GER	Semi Belkahia
7	DF	TUR	Emre Aytun
8	MF	GER	Johann Berger
9	FW	GER	Lorenzo Paldino
10	FW	GER	Julius Düker (captain)
11	FW	GER	Yannik Jaeschke
14	FW	GER	Marko Ilic
15	DF	GER	Dennis Duah (on loan from Dynamo Dresden)
16	FW	GER	Torben Engelking
19	MF	MAR	Nassim Boujellab
20	FW	GER	Christopher Schepp
21	DF	GER	Irichad Behrens
22	DF	GER	Leon Sommer

No.	Pos.	Nation	Player
23	FW	GER	Robin Müller
24	MF	GER	Noah Plume
25	GK	GER	Fynn Wolter
27	MF	GER	Tom Berger
28	MF	GER	Julian Rufidis
29	GK	GER	Norman Quindt
30	DF	AUT	Timo Friedrich
31	MF	GER	Jannik Oltrogge
33	MF	ALB	Arlind Rexhepi (on loan from Waldhof Mannheim)
34	MF	GER	Tim Dierßen
35	GK	GER	Alexander Dlugaiczyk
36	MF	GER	Temilola Awoyale
37	FW	GER	Hasan Özdemir
38	FW	GER	Leon Švitek
39	DF	GER	Florian Riedel
40	GK	GER	Jonah Busse
43	FW	AUT	Manuel Polster

=== Transfers ===
==== In ====
No.	Pos	Player	From	Type	Window	Ends	Fee	Source
6	DF	(Germany) Semi Belkahia	(Germany) Arminia Bielefeld	Transfer	Summer	30 June 2026	Free	
8	MF	(Germany) Johann Berger	(Germany) Phönix Lübeck	Transfer	Summer	30 June 2026	Free	
17	FW	(Germany) John Posselt	(Germany) SC Paderborn II	Loan	Summer	30 June 2026	Free	
19	MF	(Morocco) Nassim Boujellab	(Germany) Arminia Bielefeld	Transfer	Summer	30 June 2026	Free	
22	MF	(Germany) Leon Sommer	(Germany) VfB Lübeck	Transfer	Summer	30 June 2026	Free	
27	MF	(Germany) Robin Dreesen	(Germany) Arminia Hannover	End of loan	Summer	30 June 2026	–	
27	MF	(Germany) Tom Berger	Free agent	Transfer	Summer	30 June 2026	–	
33	MF	(Albania) Arlind Rexhepi	(Germany) Waldhof Mannheim	Loan	Summer	30 June 2026	Free	
38	FW	(Germany) Leon Švitek	(Germany) Hombrucher SV U19	Transfer	Summer	30 June 2026	Free	
–	MF	(Germany) Maxim Safronow	(Germany) Lupo Martini Wolfsburg	End of loan	Summer	30 June 2026	–	
15	DF	(Germany) Dennis Duah	(Germany) Dynamo Dresden	Loan	Winter	30 June 2026	Free	
20	FW	(Germany) Christopher Schepp	(Germany) Rot-Weiß Oberhausen	Transfer	Winter	30 June 2027	Free	
29	GK	(Germany) Norman Quindt	(Germany) Kickers Emden	Transfer	Winter	30 June 2027	Free	
36	MF	(Germany) Temilola Awoyale	(Germany) Mecklenburg Schwerin	Transfer	Winter	30 June 2027	Free	
43	FW	(Austria) Manuel Polster	(Switzerland) Lausanne-Sport	Transfer	Winter	30 June 2026	Free	

==== Out ====
No.	Pos	Player	To	Type	Window	Fee	Source
6	MF	(Germany) Vladislav Cherny	Free agent	End of contract	Summer	–	
8	MF	(Germany) Mick Gudra	(Germany) VfV Hildesheim	End of contract	Summer	–	
13	MF	(Hungary) Olivér Schindler	Free agent	Contract terminated	Summer	–	
18	MF	(Germany) Silas Steinwedel	(Germany) SV Ramlingen/Ehlershausen	Transfer	Summer	Free	
26	DF	(Germany) Niklas Tasky	(Germany) SV Ramlingen/Ehlershausen	End of contract	Summer	–	
27	MF	(Germany) Robin Dreesen	(Germany) Lupo Martini Wolfsburg	Transfer	Summer	Free	
38	FW	(Germany) Affam Ifeadigo	Free agent	End of contract	Summer	–	
–	MF	(Germany) Maxim Safronow	Free agent	Contract terminated	Summer	–	
17	FW	(Germany) John Posselt	(Germany) SC Paderborn II	End of loan	Winter	–	

== Friendly matches ==
Win Draw Loss

29 June 2025 Friendly	TSV Havelse (Germany)	2–0	(Germany) MTV Wolfenbüttel	Garbsen
14:00 CEST (UTC+2)	Mata 27', 77'	Report		Stadium: Wilhelm-Langrehr-Stadion; Referee: Benjamin Schmidt

4 July 2025 Friendly	TSV Havelse (Germany)	0–1	(Germany) Rot-Weiß Oberhausen	Garbsen
16:00 CEST (UTC+2)		Report	Aourir 79'	Stadium: Wilhelm-Langrehr-Stadion

8 July 2025 Friendly	Hertha BSC (Germany)	3–2	(Germany) TSV Havelse	Berlin
18:00 CEST (UTC+2)	Reese 22' (pen.), 34'; Grønning 50'	Report	Paldino 1'; Düker 32'	Stadium: Stadion auf dem Wurfplatz; Attendance: 2,276; Referee: Tim Kohnert

10 July 2025 Friendly	Arminia Bielefeld (Germany)	7–1	(Germany) TSV Havelse	Bielefeld
18:00 CEST (UTC+2)	Boakye 6'; Felix 21'; Sarenren Bazee 31', 51'; Kania 65' (pen.); Richter 89', 90'	Report	Cherny 81'	Stadium: Trainingsgelände an der Friedrich-Hagemann-Straße; Attendance: 600

13 July 2025 Friendly	TSV Havelse (Germany)	2–7	(Germany) SC Paderborn II	Sarstedt
14:00 CEST (UTC+2)	Mata 74'; Özdemir 80'	Report	Bugenhagen 18'; de Jong 21', 41', 51'; Ritter 34', 86'; Babak 71'	Stadium: Jahnsportpark; Attendance: 600

15 July 2025 Friendly	Holstein Kiel (Germany)	5–0	(Germany) TSV Havelse	Kiel
18:00 CEST (UTC+2)	Prasse 6'; Niehoff 70'; Knudsen 72'; Ugoh 73'; Gigović 86'	Report		Stadium: Citti Fußball Park; Attendance: 0
Note: The match lasted for 3×30 minutes.

10 October 2025 Friendly	SV Rödinghausen (Germany)	1–0	(Germany) TSV Havelse	Rödinghausen
16:00 CEST (UTC+2)	Breuer 48' (pen.)	Report		Stadium: Häcker-Wiehenstadion; Attendance: 0

14 November 2025 Friendly	FC Gütersloh (Germany)	1–4	(Germany) TSV Havelse	Gütersloh
17:00 CET (UTC+1)	Langfeld 6'	Report	Boujellab 28'; Paldino 45'; Aytun 82'; Ilic 89'	Stadium: Ohlendorf Stadion im Heidewald; Attendance: 250

7 January 2026 Friendly	TSV Havelse (Germany)	3–2	(Germany) Sportfreunde Lotte	Garbsen
	Boujellab; Paldino; Ilic	Report	Goal	Stadium: Wilhelm-Langrehr-Stadion

11 January 2026 Friendly	TSV Havelse (Germany)	4–3	(Germany) 1. FC Magdeburg II	Garbsen
	Boujellab; Paldino; Ilic; Düker	Report	Goal	Stadium: Wilhelm-Langrehr-Stadion

26 March 2026 Friendly	Preußen Münster (Germany)	0–1	(Germany) TSV Havelse	Münster
15:00 CET (UTC+1)	Schepp 65'	Report		Stadium: Sportpark Berg Fidel; Attendance: 0 Referee: Henry Schröder

== Competitions ==
Win Draw Loss

=== Overview ===
Competition	First match	Last match	Starting round	Final position	Record							
Competition	First match	Last match	Starting round	Final position	Pld	W	D	L	GF	GA	GD	Win %
3. Liga	2 August 2025	16 May 2026	Matchday 1	17th	38	9	8	21	57	89	−32	23.68
Lower Saxony Cup	30 July 2025	15 April 2026	Qualifying round	Semi-finals	3	2	1	0	5	2	+3	66.67
Total					41	11	9	21	62	91	−29	26.83

Source: Competitions

=== 3. Liga ===
==== League table ====
Pos	Team	Pld	W	D	L	GF	GA	GD	Pts	Promotion, qualification or relegation
15	1. FC Saarbrücken	38	10	14	14	51	57	−6	44	
16	TSG Hoffenheim II (Note: Reserve teams are ineligible for promotion or DFB-Pokal qualification.)	38	12	7	19	65	71	−6	43	
17	TSV Havelse (Note: 1860 Munich originally finished the season in eighth place, but were administratively relegated to the Regionalliga Bayern after failing to obtain a license for the upcoming 3. Liga season, sparing TSV Havelse from relegation.)	38	9	8	21	57	89	−32	35	Spared from relegation
18	Erzgebirge Aue (R)	38	7	13	18	51	70	−19	34	Relegation to Regionalliga
19	SSV Ulm (R)	38	9	6	23	49	78	−29	33	Relegation to Regionalliga

Source: DFB
Rules for classification: 1) Points; 2) Goal difference; 3) Goals scored; 4) Head-to-head results; 5) Head-to-head away goals scored; 6) Away goals scored; 7) Play-off.
(R) Relegated

==== Results summary ====
Overall								Home						Away					
Pld	W	D	L	GF	GA	GD	Pts	W	D	L	GF	GA	GD	W	D	L	GF	GA	GD
38	9	8	21	57	89	−32	35	7	4	8	31	39	−8	2	4	13	26	50	−24

Source: DFB

==== Results by round ====
Round	1	2	3	4	5	6	7	8	9	10	11	12	13	14	15	16	17	18	19	20	21	22	23	24	25	26	27	28	29	30	31	32	33	34	35	36	37	38
Ground	A	H	A	H	A	H	H	A	H	A	H	A	H	A	H	A	H	A	H	H	A	H	A	H	A	A	H	A	H	A	H	A	H	A	H	A	H	A
Result	D	D	L	L	L	L	D	D	L	L	L	L	L	D	W	L	D	W	D	W	L	W	L	L	L	D	L	L	W	L	L	W	W	L	W	L	W	L
Position	12	13	18	19	20	20	19	19	19	19	19	19	19	20	19	19	19	19	19	18	19	19	19	19	19	19	19	19	19	19	19	18	17	18	17	17	17	17 (Note: TSV Havelse was spared from relegation after 1860 Munich did not receive a 3. Liga license.)

Source: DFB
A = Away; H = Home; W = Win; D = Draw; L = Loss

==== Matches ====
2 August 2025 1	TSG Hoffenheim II	0–0	TSV Havelse	Sinsheim
14:00 CEST (UTC+2)		Report		Stadium: Dietmar-Hopp-Stadion; Attendance: 1,010; Referee: Leonidas Exuzidis

9 August 2025 2	TSV Havelse	1–1	Rot-Weiss Essen	Hanover
14:00 CEST (UTC+2)	Paldino 90+6'	Report	Kraulich 89'	Stadium: Eilenriedestadion; Attendance: 3,012; Referee: Felix Grund

24 August 2025 3	Erzgebirge Aue	2–1	TSV Havelse	Aue-Bad Schlema
16:30 CEST (UTC+2)	Simnica 66'; Uhlmann 83'	Report	Posselt 6'	Stadium: eins Erzgebirgsstadion; Attendance: 8,359; Referee: Jonah Besong

30 August 2025 4	TSV Havelse	0–2	VfL Osnabrück	Hanover
14:00 CEST (UTC+2)		Report	Meißner 32'; Jacobsen 61'	Stadium: Eilenriedestadion; Attendance: 2,812; Referee: Davina Lutz

14 September 2025 5	1860 Munich	3–2	TSV Havelse	Munich
19:30 CEST (UTC+2)	Volland 39'; Haugen 45'; Hobsch 90+6'	Report	Niederlechner 58' (o.g.); Posselt 89'	Stadium: Grünwalder Stadion; Attendance: 15,000; Referee: Michael Näther

17 September 2025 6	TSV Havelse	2–6	FC Ingolstadt	Hanover
19:00 CEST (UTC+2)	Kolgeci 15' (pen.); J. Berger 19'	Report	Besuschkow 39'; Carlsen 45'; Costly 53', 82'; Sturm 63', 87'	Stadium: Eilenriedestadion; Attendance: 1,212; Referee: Martin Wilke

21 September 2025 7	TSV Havelse	1–1	MSV Duisburg	Hanover
13:30 CEST (UTC+2)	Posselt 90+7'	Report	Noß 90'	Stadium: Eilenriedestadion; Attendance: 3,012; Referee: Ben Henry Uhrig

27 September 2025 8	Hansa Rostock	1–1	TSV Havelse	Rostock
14:00 CEST (UTC+2)	Fatkič 47'	Report	Aytun 5'	Stadium: Ostseestadion; Attendance: 23,021; Referee: Justin Hasmann

30 September 2025 9	TSV Havelse	2–3	Waldhof Mannheim	Hanover
19:00 CEST (UTC+2)	Posselt 60'; Belkahia 73'	Report	Masca 11'; Lohkemper 58'; Shipnoski 74'	Stadium: Eilenriedestadion; Attendance: 1,112; Referee: Assad Nouhoum

4 October 2025 10	Viktoria Köln	4–1	TSV Havelse	Cologne
14:00 CEST (UTC+2)	Kōzuki 14'; Otto 40'; Münst 51'; Lobinger 88'	Report	Rufidis 79'	Stadium: Sportpark Höhenberg; Attendance: 2,384; Referee: Simon Schreiner

19 October 2025 11	TSV Havelse	1–2	Jahn Regensburg	Hanover
19:30 CEST (UTC+2)	Posselt 16'	Report	Eichinger 29'; Oliveira 66'	Stadium: Eilenriedestadion; Attendance: 1,012; Referee: Niclas Rose

25 October 2025 12	Energie Cottbus	4–3	TSV Havelse	Cottbus
14:00 CEST (UTC+2)	Boziaris 24', 60'; Engelhardt 34'; Tolcay Ciğerci 90+6'	Report	Müller 39'; Paldino 71', 90+7'	Stadium: LEAG Energie Stadion; Attendance: 9,688; Referee: Daniel Bartnitzki

1 November 2025 13	TSV Havelse	0–2	Wehen Wiesbaden	Hanover
14:00 CET (UTC+1)		Report	Kaya 45+2'; Agrafiotis 90+1'	Stadium: Eilenriedestadion; Attendance: 912; Referee: Yannick Sager

8 November 2025 14	1. FC Saarbrücken	1–1	TSV Havelse	Saarbrücken
16:30 CET (UTC+1)	Baumann 5'	Report	Sommer 68'	Stadium: Ludwigsparkstadion; Attendance: 11,814; Referee: Davina Lutz

22 November 2025 15	TSV Havelse	2–1	SSV Ulm	Hanover
14:00 CET (UTC+1)	Aytun 23'; Ilic 57'	Report	Brandt 88'	Stadium: Eilenriedestadion; Attendance: 1,012; Referee: Simon Schreiner

30 November 2025 16	VfB Stuttgart II	2–1	TSV Havelse	Aspach
19:30 CET (UTC+1)	Sessa 36'; Ouro-Tagba 49'	Report	Posselt 70'	Stadium: WIRmachenDRUCK Arena; Attendance: 300; Referee: Michael Näther

6 December 2025 17	TSV Havelse	2–2	SC Verl	Hanover
14:00 CET (UTC+1)	Ilic 77'; Minz 90+3'	Report	Ens 18'; F. Otto 63'	Stadium: Eilenriedestadion; Attendance: 1,012; Referee: Justin Hasmann

14 December 2025 18	1. FC Schweinfurt	2–3	TSV Havelse	Schweinfurt
19:30 CET (UTC+1)	Tranziska 16'; Endres 53'	Report	Müller 17', 34'; Belkahia 77'	Stadium: Riedel Bau Arena; Attendance: 2,341; Referee: Nico Fuchs

21 December 2025 19	TSV Havelse	1–1	Alemannia Aachen	Hanover
13:30 CET (UTC+1)	Ilic 86'	Report	Wriedt 87'	Stadium: Eilenriedestadion; Attendance: 2,412; Referee: Sebastian Hilsberg

18 January 2026 20	TSV Havelse	4–0	TSG Hoffenheim II	Hanover
19:30 CET (UTC+1)	J. Berger 5' (pen.); Düker 51'; Boujellab 67'; Schepp 88' (pen.)	Report		Stadium: Eilenriedestadion; Attendance: 1,012; Referee: Felix Grund

24 January 2026 21	Rot-Weiss Essen	4–1	TSV Havelse	Essen
14:00 CET (UTC+1)	Janssen 35', 37', 52'; Müsel 68'	Report	Rexhepi 45+1'	Stadium: Stadion an der Hafenstraße; Attendance: 15,777; Referee: Ben Henry Uhrig

30 January 2026 22	TSV Havelse	3–1	Erzgebirge Aue	Hanover
19:00 CET (UTC+1)	Boujellab 74'; Paldino 80'; Müller 90+6'	Report	Fabisch 45+1'	Stadium: Eilenriedestadion; Attendance: 1,012; Referee: Cengiz Kabalakli

7 February 2026 23	VfL Osnabrück	2–0	TSV Havelse	Osnabrück
14:00 CET (UTC+1)	Kammerbauer 59'; Meißner 78'	Report		Stadium: Stadion an der Bremer Brücke; Attendance: 14,037; Referee: Simon Schreiner

14 February 2026 24	TSV Havelse	0–5	1860 Munich	Hanover
14:00 CET (UTC+1)		Report	Haugen 29'; Hobsch 53'; Lippmann 60'; Steinkötter 83'; Maier 89'	Stadium: Eilenriedestadion; Attendance: 1,912; Referee: Fabienne Michel

21 February 2026 25	FC Ingolstadt	3–2	TSV Havelse	Ingolstadt
14:00 CET (UTC+1)	Kaygin 48'; Besuschkow 58'; Costly 85'	Report	Boujellab 11'; Aytun 90+4'	Stadium: Audi Sportpark; Attendance: 3,008; Referee: Sebastian Hilsberg

1 March 2026 26	MSV Duisburg	1–1	TSV Havelse	Duisburg
16:30 CET (UTC+1)	Fleckstein 66'	Report	Rexhepi 20'	Stadium: Schauinsland-Reisen-Arena; Attendance: 19,106; Referee: Niclas Rose

4 March 2026 27	TSV Havelse	1–3	Hansa Rostock	Hanover
19:00 CET (UTC+1)	Düker 32'	Report	Holten 17'; Belkahia 30' (o.g.); Krauß 72'	Stadium: Heinz von Heiden Arena; Attendance: 6,712; Referee: Michael Näther

8 March 2026 28	Waldhof Mannheim	3–1	TSV Havelse	Mannheim
13:30 CET (UTC+1)	Lohkemper 58', 61' (pen.), 86'	Report	Sommer 49'	Stadium: Carl-Benz-Stadion; Attendance: 16,858; Referee: Davina Lutz

14 March 2026 29	TSV Havelse	3–2	Viktoria Köln	Hanover
14:00 CET (UTC+1)	Boujellab 69'; J. Berger 78' (pen.); Ilic 90+1'	Report	Handle 24'; Münst 35'	Stadium: Eilenriedestadion; Attendance: 1,012; Referee: Yannick Sager

21 March 2026 30	Jahn Regensburg	5–2	TSV Havelse	Regensburg
14:00 CET (UTC+1)	Hottmann 2', 56'; Karbstein 45+3'; Wurm 66'; Dietz 90+1'	Report	Boujellab 70'; Schepp 76'	Stadium: Jahnstadion Regensburg; Attendance: 7,069; Referee: Cengiz Kabalakli

4 April 2026 31	TSV Havelse	0–3	Energie Cottbus	Hanover
14:00 CEST (UTC+2)		Report	Borgmann 20'; Tolcay Ciğerci 23'; Hannemann 57'	Stadium: Eilenriedestadion; Attendance: 2,312; Referee: Jonah Besong

8 April 2026 32	Wehen Wiesbaden	1–4	TSV Havelse	Wiesbaden
19:00 CEST (UTC+2)	Kaya 19'	Report	Schepp 6'; Belkahia 51'; Ilic 81'; J. Berger 84' (pen.)	Stadium: BRITA-Arena; Attendance: 3,117; Referee: Assad Nouhoum

11 April 2026 33	TSV Havelse	2–0	1. FC Saarbrücken	Hanover
14:00 CEST (UTC+2)	Sommer 46'; Paldino 52'	Report		Stadium: Eilenriedestadion; Attendance: 1,012; Referee: Niclas Rose

18 April 2026 34	SSV Ulm	2–1	TSV Havelse	Ulm
16:30 CEST (UTC+2)	Chessa 63'; Mazagg 90+5'	Report	Schepp 80'	Stadium: Donaustadion; Attendance: 8,118; Referee: Justin Hasmann

26 April 2026 35	TSV Havelse	3–2	VfB Stuttgart II	Hanover
19:30 CEST (UTC+2)	Düker 45+4'; Aytun 74'; Awoyale 90+3'	Report	Darvich 65'; Ouro-Tagba 72'	Stadium: Eilenriedestadion; Attendance: 532; Referee: Simon Schreiner

2 May 2026 36	SC Verl	4–0	TSV Havelse	Verl
14:00 CEST (UTC+2)	Mhamdi 44', 49'; Wörner 45+1'; Arweiler 45+5'	Report		Stadium: Sportclub Arena; Attendance: 2,306; Referee: Fabienne Michel

10 May 2026 37	TSV Havelse	3–2	1. FC Schweinfurt	Hanover
13:30 CEST (UTC+2)	Boujellab 30', 54'; Paldino 81'	Report	Geis 28' (pen.); Böhnlein 36'	Stadium: Eilenriedestadion; Attendance: 878; Referee: Felix Grund

16 May 2026 38	Alemannia Aachen	6–1	TSV Havelse	Aachen
14:00 CEST (UTC+2)	Gindorf 7', 54' (pen.), 89'; Schroers 46', 55'; Wiebe 74'	Report	Ilic 52'	Stadium: Tivoli; Attendance: 25,409; Referee: Luca Jürgensen

=== Lower Saxony Cup ===
30 July 2025 Qualifying round	HSC Hannover	1–3	TSV Havelse	Hanover
19:00 CEST (UTC+2)	Özün 55'	Report	Düker 34'; Aytun 70'; Ilic 90+1'	Stadium: HSC-Stadion an der Constantinstraße; Referee: Lennart Kernchen

6 August 2025 Quarter-finals	FSV Schöningen	0–1	TSV Havelse	Schöningen
19:00 CEST (UTC+2)		Report	Ilic 60'	Stadium: Elmstadion; Attendance: 980; Referee: Rene-Alexander Rose

15 April 2026 Semi-finals	SSV Jeddeloh	1–1 (a.e.t.) (3–1 p)	TSV Havelse	Edewecht
19:00 CEST (UTC+2)	Wegner 32'	Report	Sommer 47'	Stadium: HASKAMP-Arena; Attendance: 1,029; Referee: Julian Bergmann
	Penalties
	Siala (penalty scored); Friedrichs (penalty scored); Touray (penalty scored)		(penalty missed) J. Berger; (penalty scored) Ilic; (penalty missed) Kolgeci; (penalty missed) Rexhepi

== Statistics ==
=== Appearances and goals ===
No.	Pos	Player	3. Liga		Lower Saxony Cup		Total	
No.	Pos	Player	Apps	Goals	Apps	Goals	Apps	Goals
1	GK	(Germany) Tom Opitz	25	0	2	0	27	0
3	DF	(Germany) Marco Schleef	2+3	0	1+1	0	7	0
4	DF	(Kosovo) Besfort Kolgeci	32	1	2	0	34	1
5	DF	(Germany) Dominic Minz	14	1	2	0	16	1
6	DF	(Germany) Semi Belkahia	30+1	3	1	0	32	3
7	DF	(Turkey) Emre Aytun	22+4	4	1	1	27	5
8	MF	(Germany) Johann Berger	30+4	4	1+1	0	36	4
9	FW	(Germany) Lorenzo Paldino	15+21	6	2+1	0	39	6
10	FW	(Germany) Julius Düker	31+1	3	3	1	35	4
11	FW	(Germany) Yannik Jaeschke	0+9	0	1+1	0	11	0
14	FW	(Germany) Marko Ilic	25+13	6	1+2	2	41	8
15	DF	(Germany) Dennis Duah	11+3	0	0+1	0	15	0
16	FW	(Germany) Torben Engelking	0	0	0	0	0	0
17	FW	(Germany) John Posselt	13+6	6	1+1	0	21	6
19	MF	(Morocco) Nassim Boujellab	29+3	7	1+1	0	34	7
20	FW	(Germany) Christopher Schepp	5+14	4	1	0	20	4
21	DF	(Germany) Irichad Behrens	1+1	0	0	0	2	0
22	DF	(Germany) Leon Sommer	26+6	3	3	1	35	4
23	FW	(Germany) Robin Müller	20+15	4	2	0	37	4
24	MF	(Germany) Noah Plume	21+3	0	3	0	27	0
25	GK	(Germany) Fynn Wolter	0	0	0	0	0	0
27	MF	(Germany) Tom Berger	0	0	0	0	0	0
28	MF	(Germany) Julian Rufidis	4+9	1	1+1	0	15	1
29	GK	(Germany) Norman Quindt	11	0	1	0	12	0
30	DF	(Austria) Timo Friedrich	0+2	0	0	0	2	0
31	MF	(Germany) Jannik Oltrogge	12+9	0	1+1	0	23	0
33	MF	(Albania) Arlind Rexhepi	19+12	2	1	0	32	2
34	MF	(Germany) Tim Dierßen	0	0	0	0	0	0
35	GK	(Germany) Alexander Dlugaiczyk	0+1	0	0	0	1	0
36	MF	(Germany) Temilola Awoyale	0+3	1	0	0	3	1
37	FW	(Germany) Hasan Özdemir	0+1	0	0	0	1	0
38	FW	(Germany) Leon Švitek	0+1	0	0+1	0	2	0
39	DF	(Germany) Florian Riedel	15+8	0	1+1	0	25	0
40	GK	(Germany) Jonah Busse	2	0	0	0	2	0
43	FW	(Austria) Manuel Polster	3+4	0	0	0	7	0

=== Goalscorers ===
Rank	No.	Pos	Name	3. Liga	Lower Saxony Cup	Total
1	14	FW	(Germany) Marko Ilic	6	2	8
2	19	MF	(Morocco) Nassim Boujellab	7	0	7
3	9	FW	(Germany) Lorenzo Paldino	6	0	6
3	17	FW	(Germany) John Posselt	6	0	6
5	7	DF	(Turkey) Emre Aytun	4	1	5
6	8	MF	(Germany) Johann Berger	4	0	4
6	10	FW	(Germany) Julius Düker	3	1	4
6	20	FW	(Germany) Christopher Schepp	4	0	4
6	22	DF	(Germany) Leon Sommer	3	1	4
6	23	FW	(Germany) Robin Müller	4	0	4
11	6	DF	(Germany) Semi Belkahia	3	0	3
12	33	MF	(Albania) Arlind Rexhepi	2	0	2
13	4	DF	(Kosovo) Besfort Kolgeci	1	0	1
13	5	DF	(Germany) Dominic Minz	1	0	1
13	28	MF	(Germany) Julian Rufidis	1	0	1
13	36	MF	(Germany) Temilola Awoyale	1	0	1
Own goals				1	0	1
Total				57	4	61

=== Clean sheets ===
Rank	No.	Pos	Name	3. Liga	Lower Saxony Cup	Total
1	1	GK	(Germany) Tom Opitz	2	1	3
2	29	GK	(Germany) Norman Quindt	1	0	1
Total				3	1	4

=== Disciplinary record ===
Rank	No.	Pos	Name	3. Liga			Lower Saxony Cup			Total		
Rank	No.	Pos	Name	Booked	(yellow card) (yellow-red card)	Sent off (straight red)	Booked	(yellow card) (yellow-red card)	Sent off (straight red)	Booked	(yellow card) (yellow-red card)	Sent off (straight red)
1	24	MF	(Germany) Noah Plume	9	2	1	1	0	0	10	2	1
2	4	DF	(Kosovo) Besfort Kolgeci	11	1	0	1	0	0	12	1	0
3	22	DF	(Germany) Leon Sommer	8	0	0	1	0	0	9	0	0
4	31	MF	(Germany) Jannik Oltrogge	8	0	0	0	0	0	8	0	0
5	8	MF	(Germany) Johann Berger	6	0	0	1	0	0	7	0	0
6	6	DF	(Germany) Semi Belkahia	3	1	0	0	0	0	3	1	0
6	19	MF	(Morocco) Nassim Boujellab	6	0	0	0	0	0	6	0	0
6	33	MF	(Albania) Arlind Rexhepi	5	0	0	1	0	0	6	0	0
9	9	FW	(Germany) Lorenzo Paldino	5	0	0	0	0	0	5	0	0
10	17	FW	(Germany) John Posselt	4	0	0	0	0	0	4	0	0
10	28	MF	(Germany) Julian Rufidis	3	0	0	1	0	0	4	0	0
12	15	DF	(Germany) Dennis Duah	3	0	0	0	0	0	3	0	0
12	23	FW	(Germany) Robin Müller	3	0	0	0	0	0	3	0	0
14	7	DF	(Turkey) Emre Aytun	2	0	0	0	0	0	2	0	0
14	10	FW	(Germany) Julius Düker	2	0	0	0	0	0	2	0	0
16	1	GK	(Germany) Tom Opitz	1	0	0	0	0	0	1	0	0
16	14	FW	(Germany) Marko Ilic	1	0	0	0	0	0	1	0	0
16	21	DF	(Germany) Irichad Behrens	1	0	0	0	0	0	1	0	0
16	29	GK	(Germany) Norman Quindt	1	0	0	0	0	0	1	0	0
16	39	DF	(Germany) Florian Riedel	1	0	0	0	0	0	1	0	0
16	40	GK	(Germany) Jonah Busse	1	0	0	0	0	0	1	0	0
16	43	FW	(Austria) Manuel Polster	1	0	0	0	0	0	1	0	0
Unknown				0	0	0	2	0	0	2	0	0
Total				85	4	1	7	0	0	92	4	1
