= 2020–21 Regionalliga =

13th season of the Regionalliga

Regionalliga
- Season: 2020–21
- Champions: not awarded (Nord); Viktoria Berlin (Nordost); Borussia Dortmund II (West); SC Freiburg II (Südwest); 1. FC Schweinfurt (Bayern)
- Promoted: TSV Havelse; Viktoria Berlin; Borussia Dortmund II; SC Freiburg II
- Relegated: Bischofswerdaer FV; SV Bergisch Gladbach; Bayern Alzenau; Eintracht Stadtallendorf; VfR Garching
- Dissolved: VfL Wolfsburg II

The 2020–21 Regionalliga was the 13th season of the Regionalliga, the ninth under the new format, as the fourth tier of the German football league system.

== Format ==
A new promotion format was decided on in 2019. From this season onward, the Regionalliga Südwest and West receive a fixed promotion spot. A third promotion spot rotates between the other three divisions, with the remaining two champions participating in play-offs for a fourth spot. A draw has determined that the Regionalliga Nordost receives the third direct promotion spot this season.

== Regionalliga Nord ==
22 teams from the states of Bremen, Hamburg, Lower Saxony and Schleswig-Holstein competed in the ninth season of the reformed Regionalliga Nord. VfV Hildesheim and Atlas Delmenhorst were promoted from the 2019–20 Oberliga Niedersachsen, Teutonia Ottensen was promoted from the 2019–20 Oberliga Hamburg, FC Oberneuland was promoted from the 2019–20 Bremen-Liga and Phönix Lübeck was promoted from the 2019–20 Schleswig-Holstein-Liga.

As the league expanded during the COVID-19 pandemic, the league was split into two regional groups. The five best teams from each group were supposed to qualify for a championship round, with the other teams qualifying for a relegation round. The relegation rules were not announced.

On 8 April 2021, the clubs voted to abandon the season due to the COVID-19 pandemic in Germany and declare the third-best team by points per game, TSV Havelse, participants in the promotion play-offs, since Weiche Flensburg and Werder Bremen II did not apply for a 3. Liga license. No teams are supposed to be promoted to or relegated from the Regionalliga. The abandonment was confirmed by the Northern German Football Association (NFV) presidium on 20 April 2021. No teams were relegated to or promoted from the Oberliga. On 18 May 2021, the NFV presidium announced that it has made an official decision on who would participate in the promotion play-offs. First, the top teams of each group that applied for a 3. Liga license, Teutonia Ottensen and TSV Havelse, were determined. Then, with involvement from the two clubs, the NFV presidium decided to nominate TSV Havelse for the promotion play-offs.

=== Nord ===
Pos	Team	Pld	W	D	L	GF	GA	GD	PPG
1	Weiche Flensburg (Note: Weiche Flensburg, Eintracht Norderstedt, SV Drochtersen/Assel and Phönix Lübeck did not apply for a 3. Liga license.)	9	8	0	1	18	6	+12	2.67
2	Eintracht Norderstedt	9	5	1	3	14	11	+3	1.78
3	SV Drochtersen/Assel	9	5	0	4	14	8	+6	1.67
4	Phönix Lübeck	9	5	0	4	11	11	0	1.67
5	Teutonia Ottensen	10	5	1	4	17	13	+4	1.60
6	FC St. Pauli II	10	5	1	4	15	15	0	1.60
7	Hamburger SV II	10	4	3	3	19	12	+7	1.50
8	Lüneburger SK Hansa	9	3	3	3	10	11	−1	1.33
9	Holstein Kiel II	10	3	0	7	10	19	−9	0.90
10	Heider SV	8	1	1	6	4	19	−15	0.50
11	Altona 93	7	1	0	6	5	12	−7	0.43

Source: kicker.de
Rules for classification: 1) Points; 2) Goal difference; 3) Goals scored

==== Top scorers ====
Rank	Player	Club	Goals
1	(Germany) Robin Meißner	Hamburger SV II	6
1	(Germany) Cemal Sezer	FC St. Pauli II	6
3	(Germany) Alexander Neumann	SV Drochtersen/Assel	5
3	(Germany) Evans Owusu Nyarko	Eintracht Norderstedt	5
5	(Germany) Christopher Kramer	Weiche Flensburg	4
5	(Germany) Moritz Kwarteng	Hamburger SV II	4
5	(Germany) Malte Meyer	Lüneburger SK Hansa	4

=== Süd ===
Pos	Team	Pld	W	D	L	GF	GA	GD	PPG	Qualification
1	Werder Bremen II (Note: Werder Bremen II did not apply for a 3. Liga license.)	8	6	2	0	15	5	+10	2.50	
2	TSV Havelse (O, P)	9	6	2	1	22	6	+16	2.22	Qualification for promotion play-offs
3	Schwarz-Weiß Rehden	9	5	2	2	17	10	+7	1.89	
4	VfB Oldenburg	8	4	2	2	12	8	+4	1.75	
5	SSV Jeddeloh	8	3	3	2	13	13	0	1.50	
6	Hannover 96 II	9	4	1	4	14	16	−2	1.44	
7	VfV Hildesheim	9	3	2	4	9	15	−6	1.22	
8	FC Oberneuland	10	4	0	6	9	15	−6	1.20	
9	VfL Wolfsburg II (Note: VfL Wolfsburg dissolved its reserve team at the end of the season.)	9	3	0	6	12	15	−3	1.00	Dissolved
10	HSC Hannover	10	2	0	8	14	24	−10	0.60	
11	Atlas Delmenhorst	7	0	2	5	5	15	−10	0.29	

Source: kicker.de
Rules for classification: 1) Points; 2) Goal difference; 3) Goals scored
(O) Play-off winners; (P) Promoted

==== Top scorers ====
Rank	Player	Club	Goals
1	(Germany) Eren Dinkçi	Werder Bremen II	7
2	(Germany) Yannik Jaeschke	TSV Havelse	6
3	(The Gambia) Kebba Badjie	Werder Bremen II	5
3	(Portugal) Bocar Djumo	Schwarz-Weiß Rehden	5
3	(Australia) John Iredale	VfL Wolfsburg II	5
3	(Germany) Niklas Kiene	HSC Hannover	5

== Regionalliga Nordost ==
20 teams from the states of Berlin, Brandenburg, Mecklenburg-Vorpommern, Saxony, Saxony-Anhalt and Thuringia competed in the eighth season of the reformed Regionalliga Nordost. Chemnitzer FC and Carl Zeiss Jena were relegated from the 2019–20 3. Liga. Tennis Borussia Berlin was promoted from the 2019–20 NOFV-Oberliga Nord and FSV Luckenwalde was promoted from the 2019–20 NOFV-Oberliga Süd.

On 24 March 2021, the clubs unanimously voted to abandon the season due to the COVID-19 pandemic in Germany and declare Viktoria Berlin champions. This decision was confirmed by the Northeastern German Football Association presidium on 16 April 2021, which also decided that one team would be relegated and the league size limited to 22 teams for the next season, which meant that a second team would have been relegated had three teams been relegated to the Regionalliga Nordost.

Pos	Team	Pld	W	D	L	GF	GA	GD	PPG	Promotion or relegation
1	Viktoria Berlin (C, P)	11	11	0	0	26	9	+17	3.00	Promotion to 3. Liga
2	VSG Altglienicke	11	8	1	2	29	14	+15	2.27	
3	Chemie Leipzig	13	7	3	3	25	12	+13	1.85	
4	Carl Zeiss Jena	12	6	3	3	24	16	+8	1.75	
5	Berliner AK	12	6	2	4	25	21	+4	1.67	
6	BFC Dynamo	11	5	3	3	26	17	+9	1.64	
7	Lokomotive Leipzig	12	5	4	3	20	17	+3	1.58	
8	Union Fürstenwalde	11	5	1	5	22	20	+2	1.45	
9	Energie Cottbus	13	5	3	5	18	19	−1	1.38	
10	Chemnitzer FC	13	5	2	6	20	17	+3	1.31	
11	SV Babelsberg	13	4	5	4	18	20	−2	1.31	
12	Hertha BSC II	11	3	5	3	12	15	−3	1.27	
13	SV Lichtenberg	13	4	4	5	15	20	−5	1.23	
14	FSV Luckenwalde	13	4	3	6	14	22	−8	1.15	
15	VfB Auerbach	12	3	2	7	18	26	−8	0.92	
16	Tennis Borussia Berlin	10	2	3	5	15	20	−5	0.90	
17	Germania Halberstadt	13	2	5	6	12	18	−6	0.85	
18	ZFC Meuselwitz	13	2	5	6	14	22	−8	0.85	
19	Optik Rathenow	13	2	5	6	15	25	−10	0.85	
20	Bischofswerdaer FV (R)	12	2	1	9	12	30	−18	0.58	Relegation to NOFV-Oberliga

Source: kicker.de
Rules for classification: 1) Points; 2) Goal difference; 3) Goals scored
(C) Champions; (P) Promoted; (R) Relegated

=== Top goalscorers ===
Rank	Player	Club	Goals
1	(Germany) Marc-Philipp Zimmermann	VfB Auerbach	11
2	(Turkey) Tolcay Ciğerci	VSG Altglienicke	9
3	(Germany) Abdulkadir Beyazıt	Berliner AK	7
3	(Germany) Lucas Brumme	BFC Dynamo	7
3	(Germany) Stephané Mvibudulu	Chemie Leipzig	7

== Regionalliga West ==
21 teams from North Rhine-Westphalia competed in the Regionalliga West. Preußen Münster was relegated from the 2019–20 3. Liga. FC Wegberg-Beeck was promoted from the 2019–20 Mittelrheinliga, SV Straelen was promoted from the 2019–20 Oberliga Niederrhein and SC Wiedenbrück and Rot Weiss Ahlen were promoted from the 2019–20 Oberliga Westfalen.

Contrary to previous seasons, due to time pressure the Westphalia DFB-Pokal play-off was not played for the next two seasons. Originally, the winner of the 2020–21 Oberliga Westfalen was supposed to qualify for the 2021–22 DFB-Pokal, while the best-placed Westphalian team from the 2021–22 Regionalliga West was supposed to qualify for the 2022–23 DFB-Pokal. However, due to the COVID-19 pandemic in Germany, the Oberliga Westfalen had to be abandoned and the order was swapped.

Initially, five teams were going to be relegated. However, the Mittelrheinliga, Oberliga Niederrhein and Oberliga Westfalen were all abandoned, with no teams from these leagues being promoted. Therefore, only one team was relegated.

Pos	Team	Pld	W	D	L	GF	GA	GD	Pts	Promotion, qualification or relegation
1	Borussia Dortmund II (C, P)	40	27	12	1	94	31	+63	93	Promotion to 3. Liga
2	Rot-Weiss Essen	40	27	9	4	90	28	+62	90	
3	Preußen Münster	40	23	9	8	70	39	+31	78	Qualification for DFB-Pokal
4	Fortuna Köln	40	18	12	10	66	48	+18	66	
5	1. FC Köln II	40	17	10	13	66	55	+11	61	
6	SV Rödinghausen	40	15	14	11	52	39	+13	59	
7	Rot-Weiß Oberhausen	40	15	14	11	61	50	+11	59	
8	Schalke 04 II	40	15	12	13	59	56	+3	57	
9	Fortuna Düsseldorf II	40	15	11	14	67	53	+14	56	
10	SC Wiedenbrück	40	13	17	10	55	49	+6	56	
11	Borussia Mönchengladbach II	40	16	7	17	49	55	−6	55	
12	Wuppertaler SV	40	16	6	18	56	62	−6	54	
13	SV Straelen	40	12	11	17	45	61	−16	47	
14	Alemannia Aachen	40	11	12	17	35	48	−13	45	
15	Sportfreunde Lotte	40	10	14	16	47	72	−25	44	
16	SV Lippstadt	40	9	13	18	37	63	−26	40	
17	FC Wegberg-Beeck	40	9	12	19	36	62	−26	39	
18	Rot Weiss Ahlen	40	8	14	18	50	69	−19	38	
19	Bonner SC	40	10	8	22	39	66	−27	38	
20	VfB Homberg	40	9	8	23	40	75	−35	35	
21	SV Bergisch Gladbach (R)	40	8	9	23	36	69	−33	33	Relegation to Oberliga

Source: kicker.de
Rules for classification: 1) Points; 2) Goal difference; 3) Goals scored
(C) Champions; (P) Promoted; (R) Relegated

=== Top goalscorers ===
Rank	Player	Club	Goals
1	(Germany) Simon Engelmann	Rot-Weiss Essen	29
2	(Germany) Steffen Tigges	Borussia Dortmund II	22
3	(Germany) Serhat Koruk	SV Bergisch Gladbach	20
4	(Germany) Phil Beckhoff	SC Wiedenbrück	15
5	(Germany) Sven Kreyer	Rot-Weiß Oberhausen	14
5	(Germany) Steffen Meuer	Fortuna Düsseldorf II	14
5	(Germany) Roman Prokoph	Fortuna Köln	14

== Regionalliga Südwest ==
22 teams from Baden-Württemberg, Hesse, Rhineland-Palatinate and Saarland competed in the eighth season of the Regionalliga Südwest. Sonnenhof Großaspach was relegated from the 2019–20 3. Liga. Schott Mainz was promoted from the 2019–20 Oberliga Rheinland-Pfalz/Saar, VfB Stuttgart II was promoted from the 2019–20 Oberliga Baden-Württemberg and Eintracht Stadtallendorf and Hessen Kassel were promoted from the 2019–20 Hessenliga.

Initially, six teams were going to be relegated. However, the Oberliga Rheinland-Pfalz/Saar, Oberliga Baden-Württemberg and Hessenliga were all abandoned, with no teams from these leagues being promoted. Therefore, only two teams were relegated.

Pos	Team	Pld	W	D	L	GF	GA	GD	Pts	Promotion or relegation
1	SC Freiburg II (C, P)	42	28	9	5	95	38	+57	93	Promotion to 3. Liga
2	SV Elversberg	42	25	13	4	98	42	+56	88	
3	Kickers Offenbach	42	25	12	5	80	32	+48	87	
4	SSV Ulm	42	23	10	9	75	40	+35	79	
5	TSV Steinbach Haiger	42	21	11	10	84	47	+37	74	
6	FSV Frankfurt	42	20	10	12	58	48	+10	70	
7	FC 08 Homburg	42	18	14	10	73	53	+20	68	
8	VfB Stuttgart II	42	19	8	15	82	55	+27	65	
9	Bahlinger SC	42	17	10	15	66	75	−9	61	
10	Rot-Weiß Koblenz	42	15	11	16	57	61	−4	56	
11	FC Gießen	42	13	14	15	52	51	+1	53	
12	Hessen Kassel	42	13	14	15	57	71	−14	53	
13	VfR Aalen	42	13	13	16	49	60	−11	52	
14	FK Pirmasens	42	13	13	16	44	58	−14	52	
15	TSG Balingen	42	14	9	19	51	60	−9	51	
16	1899 Hoffenheim II	42	13	11	18	59	76	−17	50	
17	Mainz 05 II	42	13	10	19	58	73	−15	49	
18	Astoria Walldorf	42	14	5	23	64	79	−15	47	
19	Sonnenhof Großaspach	42	11	10	21	52	75	−23	43	
20	Schott Mainz	42	11	5	26	55	104	−49	38	
21	Bayern Alzenau (R)	42	5	10	27	47	94	−47	25	Relegation to Oberliga
22	Eintracht Stadtallendorf (R)	42	3	8	31	40	104	−64	17	Relegation to Oberliga

Source: kicker.de
Rules for classification: 1) Points; 2) Goal difference; 3) Goals scored
(C) Champions; (P) Promoted; (R) Relegated

=== Top goalscorers ===
Rank	Player	Club	Goals
1	(Germany) Sascha Marquet	TSV Steinbach Haiger	26
2	(Germany) Santiago Fischer	Bahlinger SC	23
3	(Germany) Marcel Sökler	VfB Stuttgart II	21
4	(Albania) Marvin Cuni	Sonnenhof Großaspach	19
4	(Ivory Coast) Jean Romaric Kevin Koffi	SV Elversberg	19

== Regionalliga Bayern ==
The Bavarian Football Association cancelled the 2020–21 season, which would have been the ninth for the Regionalliga Bayern, and enrolled Türkgücü München in the 2020–21 3. Liga. The ongoing 2019–20 season had to resume without Türkgücü in September 2020 and conclude in mid-2021.

Pos	Team	Pld	W	D	L	GF	GA	GD	PPG	Qualification or relegation
1	Viktoria Aschaffenburg	25	15	5	5	51	27	+24	2.00	Qualification to championship play-offs
2	SpVgg Bayreuth	25	14	7	4	53	28	+25	1.96 (Note: Head-to-head points: SpVgg Bayreuth 4, 1. FC Nürnberg II 1)	Qualification to championship play-offs
3	1. FC Nürnberg II (Note: 1. FC Nürnberg II did not apply for a 3. Liga license.)	25	14	7	4	61	32	+29	1.96	
4	1. FC Schweinfurt	23	14	2	7	48	29	+19	1.91	Qualification to championship play-offs
5	TSV Aubstadt	25	11	6	8	43	41	+2	1.56	
6	VfB Eichstätt	26	10	7	9	46	32	+14	1.42	
7	TSV Buchbach	25	9	8	8	32	29	+3	1.40	
8	Greuther Fürth II	26	10	6	10	31	33	−2	1.38	
9	FC Augsburg II	25	9	7	9	44	35	+9	1.36	
10	SV Schalding-Heining	24	9	5	10	34	45	−11	1.33	
11	Wacker Burghausen	25	9	6	10	36	35	+1	1.32	
12	FV Illertissen	25	9	4	12	37	51	−14	1.24	
13	TSV Rain am Lech	25	9	3	13	26	41	−15	1.20	
14	SV Heimstetten	25	8	2	15	44	54	−10	1.04	
15	FC Memmingen	22	4	8	10	18	30	−12	0.91	
16	1860 Rosenheim	25	6	3	16	30	61	−31	0.84	
17	VfR Garching (R)	20	3	4	13	21	52	−31	0.65	Relegation to Bayernliga

Source: kicker.de
Rules for classification: 1) Points per game; 2) Head-to-head points; 3) Head-to-head goal difference; 4) Head-to-head goals scored; 5) Head-to-head away goals scored; 6) Goal difference; 7) Goals scored per game; 8) Number of wins per game; 9) Draw
(R) Relegated

=== Championship play-offs ===
Pos	Team	Pld	W	D	L	GF	GA	GD	Pts	Qualification	SCH	ASC	BAY
1	1. FC Schweinfurt (C)	4	3	1	0	9	2	+7	10	Qualification to promotion play-offs	—	1–1	2–1
2	Viktoria Aschaffenburg	4	1	1	2	8	7	+1	4		0–2	—	7–0
3	SpVgg Bayreuth	4	1	0	3	5	13	−8	3		0–4	4–0	—

Source: kicker.de
Rules for classification: 1) Points; 2) Head-to-head points; 3) Head-to-head goal difference; 4) Head-to-head goals scored; 5) Head-to-head away goals scored; 6) Goal difference; 7) Goals scored; 8) Number of wins; 9) Number of away goals; 10) Draw
(C) Champions

=== Top scorers ===
Rank	Player	Club	Goals
1	(Germany) Fabian Eberle	VfB Eichstätt	16
1	(Germany) Lukas Riglewski	SV Heimstetten	16
3	(Germany) Ingo Feser	TSV Aubstadt	13
3	(Germany) Adam Jabiri	1. FC Schweinfurt	13
5	(Germany) Björn Schnitzer	Viktoria Aschaffenburg	12

== Promotion play-offs ==
The match dates were announced on 23 April 2021. A draw was held on 8 May 2021 to determine the order of the legs.

Team 1	Agg.	Team 2	1st leg	2nd leg
1. FC Schweinfurt	0–2	TSV Havelse	0–1	0–1

All times Central European Summer Time (UTC+2)

12 June 2021
13:00

1. FC Schweinfurt	0–1	TSV Havelse
	Report	Fölster 90+5'

Willy-Sachs-Stadion, Schweinfurt
Attendance: 1,000
Referee: Robert Kampka
19 June 2021
13:00

TSV Havelse	1–0	1. FC Schweinfurt
Schumacher 35'	Report

Wilhelm-Langrehr-Stadion, Garbsen
Attendance: 1,100
Referee: Christof Günsch

TSV Havelse won 2–0 on aggregate.
