= Jonas Sonnenberg =

German association football player

Personal information
- Date of birth: 23 June 1993 (age 33)
- Place of birth: Braunschweig, Germany
- Height: 1.91 m (6 ft 3 in)
- Position: Centre-back

Team information
- Current team: TB Bortfeld

Youth career
- TSV Wendezelle
- –2007: VfB Peine
- 2007–2013: VfL Wolfsburg

Senior career*
Years	Team	Apps	(Gls)
2012–2015	VfL Wolfsburg II	30	(0)
2015–2016	Jahn Regensburg	2	(0)
2016–2022	TSV Havelse	71	(6)
2022–	TB Bortfeld	0	(0)
- * Club domestic league appearances and goals as of 14 May 2022

Jonas Sonnenberg (born 23 June 1993) is a German footballer who plays as a centre-back for TB Bortfeld.

== Career ==
Sonnenberg made his professional debut for TSV Havelse in the 3. Liga on 24 July 2021 against 1. FC Saarbrücken, coming on in the 88th minute as a substitute for Vico Meien.
