= Ilir Qela =

German footballer (born 2001)

Personal information
- Date of birth: 3 January 2001 (age 25)
- Place of birth: Hanover, Germany
- Height: 1.82 m (6 ft 0 in)
- Position: Forward

Team information
- Current team: SV Babelsberg 03
- Number: 20

Youth career
- –2018: Hannover 96
- 2018–2019: TSV Havelse

Senior career*
Years	Team	Apps	(Gls)
2020–2023	TSV Havelse	26	(3)
2023–2024	SV Babelsberg 03	19	(3)
2024	Luckenwalde	5	(0)
2025–	Bremer SV	4	(0)
- * Club domestic league appearances and goals as of 13 April 2025

Ilir Qela (born 3 January 2001) is a German footballer who plays as a forward for Regionalliga Nordost club SV Babelsberg 03.

== Career ==
Qela made his professional debut for TSV Havelse in the 3. Liga on 14 January 2022 against MSV Duisburg, coming on in the 90th minute as a substitute for Kianz Froese.
