= Leonardo Gubinelli =

German footballer (born 2000)

Personal information
- Date of birth: 27 August 2000 (age 26)
- Place of birth: Rothrist, Switzerland
- Height: 1.80 m (5 ft 11 in)
- Position: Right midfielder

Team information
- Current team: Kriens
- Number: 25

Youth career
- 2017–2019: Basel

Senior career*
Years	Team	Apps	(Gls)
2018–2022	Basel U21	66	(10)
2022	→ TSV Havelse (loan)	14	(1)
2022–	Kriens	41	(3)
- * Club domestic league appearances and goals as of 26 June 2026

Leonardo Gubinelli (born 27 August 2000) is a Swiss footballer who plays as a right midfielder for Kriens.

== Career ==
Gubinelli made his professional debut for TSV Havelse in the 3. Liga on 26 January 2022 against Wehen Wiesbaden, coming on as a substitute for Julian Rufidis in the 74th minute.

On 2 August 2022, Gubinelli signed with Kriens.
