= Johann Berger (footballer) =

German footballer

Personal information
- Date of birth: 23 July 1999 (age 27)
- Place of birth: Rostock, Germany
- Height: 1.84 m (6 ft 0 in)
- Position: Midfielder

Team information
- Current team: TSV Havelse
- Number: 8

Youth career
- –2011: SV Hafen Rostock
- 2011–2017: Hansa Rostock

Senior career*
Years	Team	Apps	(Gls)
2017–2019	Hansa Rostock II	26	(6)
2017–2019	Hansa Rostock	4	(0)
2019–2021	Holstein Kiel II	31	(3)
2021–2023	Rostocker FC	58	(12)
2023–2025	Phönix Lübeck	66	(16)
2025–	TSV Havelse	34	(4)
- * Club domestic league appearances and goals as of 16 July 2026

Johann Berger (born 23 July 1999) is a German footballer who plays as a midfielder for 3. Liga club TSV Havelse.

== Career ==
After turning down a contract extension from Hansa Rostock in March 2019, it was announced in April 2019 that Berger would leave the club and instead join the reserve team of Holstein Kiel on a 2-year contract.

Berger joined TSV Havelse ahead of the 2025–26 season.
