= Jürgen Stoffregen =

German footballer

Personal information
- Date of birth: 10 March 1957 (age 69)
- Place of birth: Hildesheim, Germany
- Height: 1.83 m (6 ft 0 in)
- Position: Midfielder

Senior career*
Years	Team	Apps	(Gls)
1977–1978	TSV Havelse		
1978–1980	Hannover 96		
1980–1988	TSV Havelse		

Managerial career
- 1991–1993: TSV Havelse
- 1993–1995: TSV Krähenwinkel/Kaltenweide
- 1995–1996: Hannover 96 II
- 1996: Hannover 96
- 1999–2004: Hannover 96 U19
- 2004–2010: TSV Havelse
- 2011–2012: Schwarz-Weiß Rehden
- 2013–2016: VfV Hildesheim
- 2017: VfV Hildesheim
- * Club domestic league appearances and goals

Jürgen Stoffregen (born 10 March 1957) is a German former football player and manager who played as a midfielder.
