= Tobias Stirl =

German footballer (born 2000)

Personal information
- Date of birth: 17 April 2000 (age 26)
- Place of birth: Frankfurt, Germany
- Height: 1.88 m (6 ft 2 in)
- Position: Goalkeeper

Team information
- Current team: Wisconsin Badgers

Youth career
- –2015: FSV Frankfurt
- 2015–2019: Eintracht Frankfurt

College career
| Years | Team | Apps | (Gls) |
| 2022– | Wisconsin Badgers | 0 | (0) |

Senior career*
| Years | Team | Apps | (Gls) |
| 2018–2019 | Eintracht Frankfurt | 0 | (0) |
| 2019–2021 | VfL Wolfsburg II | 3 | (0) |
| 2021–2022 | TSV Havelse | 1 | (0) |
- * Club domestic league appearances and goals as of 14 May 2022

Tobias Stirl (born 17 April 2000) is a German footballer who plays as a goalkeeper for American team Wisconsin Badgers representing the University of Wisconsin–Madison.

== Career ==
Stirl made his professional debut for TSV Havelse in the 3. Liga on 2 April 2022 against Eintracht Braunschweig.
