= Oliver Daedlow =

German footballer (born 2000)

Personal information
- Date of birth: 29 June 2000 (age 26)
- Place of birth: Neubrandenburg, Germany
- Height: 1.80 m (5 ft 11 in)
- Positions: Central midfielder; attacking midfielder

Team information
- Current team: Greifswalder FC
- Number: 25

Youth career
- –2016: 1. FC Neubrandenburg 04
- 2016–2019: Hansa Rostock

Senior career*
Years	Team	Apps	(Gls)
2019–2023	Hansa Rostock II	29	(0)
2020–2022	Hansa Rostock	19	(0)
2021–2022	→ TSV Havelse (loan)	23	(0)
2023–	Greifswalder FC	73	(4)
- * Club domestic league appearances and goals as of 22 June 2026

Oliver Daedlow (born 29 June 2000) is a German footballer who plays as a central midfielder or attacking midfielder for Greifswalder FC.

== Career ==
Daedlow was born in Neubrandenburg. He played youth football for 1. FC Neubrandenburg 04 before joining Hansa Rostock's academy in 2016.

He made his Hansa Rostock debut on 1 July 2020 in a 1–0 3. Liga victory over KFC Uerdingen 05. Later that month, he signed his first professional contract with the club, lasting until 2022.

He was loaned out to TSV Havelse for the 2021–22 season.

On 3 May 2023, Greifswalder FC announced the signing of Daedlow from the upcoming 2023–24 season.
