= Erik Henschel =

German footballer

Personal information
- Date of birth: 4 October 1996 (age 30)
- Place of birth: Hildesheim, Germany
- Height: 1.85 m (6 ft 1 in)
- Position: Right-back

Team information
- Current team: SV Arminia Hannover
- Number: 8

Youth career
- –2012: Hannover 96
- 2012–2015: Eintracht Braunschweig

Senior career*
| Years | Team | Apps | (Gls) |
| 2015–2018 | Eintracht Braunschweig II | 80 | (1) |
| 2018–2020 | Hallescher FC | 1 | (0) |
| 2020 | HSC Hannover | 9 | (0) |
| 2021–2022 | TSV Havelse | 0 | (0) |
| 2022– | SV Arminia Hannover | 12 | (1) |
- * Club domestic league appearances and goals as of 13 November 2022

Erik Henschel (born 4 October 1996) is a German footballer who plays as a right-back for SV Arminia Hannover.

== Career ==
Henschel made his professional debut for Hallescher FC in the 3. Liga on 22 December 2018, coming on as a substitute in the 90th minute for Marvin Ajani in the 2–0 home win against FSV Zwickau.
