= Deniz Cicek =

German footballer (born 1992)

Personal information
- Date of birth: 19 October 1992 (age 34)
- Place of birth: Hanover, Germany
- Height: 1.72 m (5 ft 8 in)
- Position: Midfielder

Team information
- Current team: STK Eilvese
- Number: 8

Youth career
- –2008: Hannoverscher SC
- 2008–2010: TSV Havelse

Senior career*
Years	Team	Apps	(Gls)
2010–2014	TSV Havelse	59	(8)
2014–2015	Sportfreunde Lotte	17	(2)
2015–2024	TSV Havelse	195	(25)
2024–	STK Eilvese	13	(3)
- * Club domestic league appearances and goals as of 12 April 2025

Deniz Cicek (born 19 October 1992) is a German footballer who plays as a midfielder for STK Eilvese in Landesliga Hannover. Born in Germany, he is of Turkish descent.

== Career ==
Cicek made his professional debut for TSV Havelse in the 3. Liga on 2 October 2021 against 1. FC Kaiserslautern.
