= Fynn Arkenberg =

German footballer (born 1996)

Personal information
- Date of birth: 4 March 1996 (age 30)
- Place of birth: Neustadt am Rübenberge, Germany
- Height: 1.88 m (6 ft 2 in)
- Position: Centre-back

Team information
- Current team: FC Gütersloh
- Number: 33

Youth career
- –2011: TSV Havelse
- 2011–2015: Hannover 96

Senior career*
Years	Team	Apps	(Gls)
2015–2018	Hannover 96 II	69	(1)
2016–2017	Hannover 96	3	(0)
2018–2019	Hallescher FC	17	(0)
2019–2021	SV Rödinghausen	52	(1)
2021–2022	TSV Havelse	31	(2)
2022–2025	Hannover 96 II	94	(1)
2025–	FC Gütersloh	33	(1)
- * Club domestic league appearances and goals as of 23 September 2026

Fynn Arkenberg (born 4 March 1996) is a German professional footballer who plays as a centre-back for Regionalliga West club FC Gütersloh.

== Career ==
Arkenberg is a youth exponent from Hannover 96. He made his Bundesliga debut on 7 May 2016 against TSG 1899 Hoffenheim. He played the full game.
