= Denis Kina =

German association football player

Personal information
- Date of birth: 8 November 1992 (age 34)
- Place of birth: Bielefeld, Germany
- Height: 1.78 m (5 ft 10 in)
- Position: Right-back

Youth career
- –2009: Arminia Bielefeld
- 2009–2010: SC Paderborn
- 2010–2011: Arminia Bielefeld

Senior career*
Years	Team	Apps	(Gls)
2011–2014	Arminia Bielefeld II		
2014–2017	TSV Havelse	88	(6)
2017–2018	FC Gütersloh	19	(0)
2018–2022	TSV Havelse	50	(0)
- * Club domestic league appearances and goals as of 17:13, 24 January 2022 (UTC)

Denis Kina (born 8 November 1992) is a German footballer who last played as a right-back for TSV Havelse.

== Career ==
Kina made his professional debut for TSV Havelse in the 3. Liga on 5 September 2021 against Borussia Dortmund II.
