= Robin Müller =

German footballer

Personal information
- Full name: Robin Guy Müller
- Date of birth: 16 June 2000 (age 26)
- Place of birth: Berlin, Germany
- Height: 1.76 m (5 ft 9 in)
- Position: Midfielder

Team information
- Current team: TSV Havelse
- Number: 23

Youth career
- –2018: Hertha Zehlendorf

Senior career*
Years	Team	Apps	(Gls)
2019–2022	SV Babelsberg	46	(1)
2022–2023	FC St. Pauli II	30	(11)
2023–2024	MSV Duisburg	27	(3)
2025–	TSV Havelse	47	(9)
- * Club domestic league appearances and goals as of 30 May 2026

Robin Guy Müller (born 16 June 2000) is a German professional footballer who plays as a midfielder for TSV Havelse.

== Career ==
Müller spent his first years at SV Babelsberg, and moved to FC St. Pauli II in the summer of 2022. Just a year later, he signed with MSV Duisburg. He made his professional debut for Duisburg on 19 August 2023, in the 3. Liga match against 1860 Munich.

== Career statistics ==
As of 12 May 2024

Appearances and goals by club, season and competition
Club	Season	Division	League		Cup		Continental		Total	
Club	Season	Division	Apps	Goals	Apps	Goals	Apps	Goals	Apps	Goals
SV Babelsberg	2019–20	Regionalliga Nordost	9	0	—		—		9	0
SV Babelsberg	2020–21	Regionalliga Nordost	11	1	2	0	—		13	1
SV Babelsberg	2021–22	Regionalliga Nordost	26	0	—		—		26	0
SV Babelsberg	Total		46	1	2	0	—		48	1
FC St. Pauli II	2022–23	Regionalliga Nord	29	10	—		—		29	10
FC St. Pauli II	2023–24	Regionalliga Nord	1	1	—		—		1	1
FC St. Pauli II	Total		30	11	—		—		30	11
MSV Duisburg	2023–24	3. Liga	27	3	—		—		27	3
Career total			103	15	2	0	—		105	15
