= Marco Schleef =

German footballer

Personal information
- Date of birth: 15 January 1999 (age 27)
- Place of birth: Hanover, Germany
- Height: 1.85 m (6 ft 1 in)
- Positions: Left-back; centre-back

Team information
- Current team: Arminia Hannover

Youth career
- –2015: TSV Havelse
- 2015–2018: Eintracht Braunschweig

Senior career*
Years	Team	Apps	(Gls)
2017–2018	Eintracht Braunschweig II	0	(0)
2018–2026	TSV Havelse	125	(5)
2026–	Arminia Hannover	0	(0)
- * Club domestic league appearances and goals as of 9 July 2026

Marco Schleef (born 15 January 1999) is a German footballer who plays as a left-back and centre-back for Arminia Hannover.

== Career ==
Schleef made his professional debut for TSV Havelse in the 3. Liga on 5 February 2022 against SV Meppen, coming on as a substitute for Leon Damer in the 87th minute.
