= Linus Meyer =

German footballer

Personal information
- Full name: Linus Niklas Martin Meyer
- Date of birth: 7 January 1992 (age 34)
- Place of birth: Hamburg, Germany
- Height: 1.85 m (6 ft 1 in)
- Position: Attacking midfielder

Team information
- Current team: Niendorfer TSV
- Number: 10

Youth career
- Niendorfer TSV
- –2010: Concordia Hamburg

Senior career*
Years	Team	Apps	(Gls)
2010–2018	Eintracht Norderstedt	116	(28)
2018–2020	SV Rödinghausen	45	(5)
2020–2021	VSG Altglienicke	6	(6)
2021–2022	TSV Havelse	22	(1)
2022–2023	FC Teutonia Ottensen	13	(1)
2023	Heeslinger SC	15	(4)
2023–	Niendorfer TSV	21	(11)
- * Club domestic league appearances and goals as of 17 May 2024

Linus Niklas Martin Meyer (born 7 January 1992) is a German footballer who plays as an attacking midfielder for Niendorfer TSV.

== Career ==
Meyer made his professional debut for TSV Havelse in the 3. Liga on 24 July 2021 against 1. FC Saarbrücken.
