= Alexander Dlugaiczyk =

German footballer (born 1983)

Personal information
- Date of birth: 17 February 1983 (age 43)
- Place of birth: Hanover, Germany
- Height: 1.95 m (6 ft 5 in)
- Position: Goalkeeper

Youth career
- TuS Wettbergen
- Sportfreunde Ricklingen
- –2002: Hannover 96

Senior career*
Years	Team	Apps	(Gls)
2002–2003	Hannover 96 II		
2003–2007	Arminia Hannover	56	(0)
2007–2009	TSV Havelse	34	(0)
2009–2013	SC Langenhagen	124	(0)
2013–2014	OSV Hannover		
2014–2017	TSV Havelse	17	(0)
2017–2018	Hannoverscher SC	29	(0)
2018–2026	TSV Havelse	22	(0)
- * Club domestic league appearances and goals

Alexander Dlugaiczyk (born 17 February 1983) is a German former footballer who played as a goalkeeper.

== Career ==
Dlugaiczyk made his professional debut for TSV Havelse in the 3. Liga on 14 May 2022 against Waldhof Mannheim, coming on as a substitute for Norman Quindt in the 87th minute.
