= Christian Benbennek =

German football coach

Personal information
- Date of birth: 9 November 1972 (age 53)
- Place of birth: Soltau, West Germany

Managerial career
- Years: Team
- 2005–2007: VfL Wolfsburg II
- 2009–2011: Eintracht Braunschweig II
- 2012–2013: SV Babelsberg 03
- 2013–2015: TSV Havelse
- 2015: Alemannia Aachen
- 2016–2017: SV Ried
- 2015: Greuther Fürth II (caretaker)
- 2017–2018: TSV Havelse
- 2019–2022: BFC Dynamo
- 2024–: FSV Schöningen

Christian Benbennek (born 9 November 1972) is a German football coach who is the head coach of FSV Schöningen.

== Career ==
Benbennek joined VfL Wolfsburg as a youth coach in 1999, and spent ten years with the club, managing the reserve team from 2005 to 2007. In 2009, he moved to Wolfsburg's neighbours Eintracht Braunschweig, where he also served as reserve team manager for two years, before being replaced by Henning Bürger. After a year serving as a scout for Eintracht, he was surprisingly appointed as manager of 3. Liga side SV Babelsberg 03 at the beginning of the 2012–13 season, replacing Dietmar Demuth. He was sacked from the role in April 2013 with the club in danger of relegation. He took over as TSV Havelse manager in July 2013.

Benbennek joined Alemannia Aachen in May 2015. He was fired in December 2015. In May 2016, Benbennek took over as manager of Austrian Football Bundesliga club SV Ried.

On 7 April 2022 he was fired as the head coach of BFC Dynamo.
