= Kianz Froese =

Canadian soccer player (born 1996)

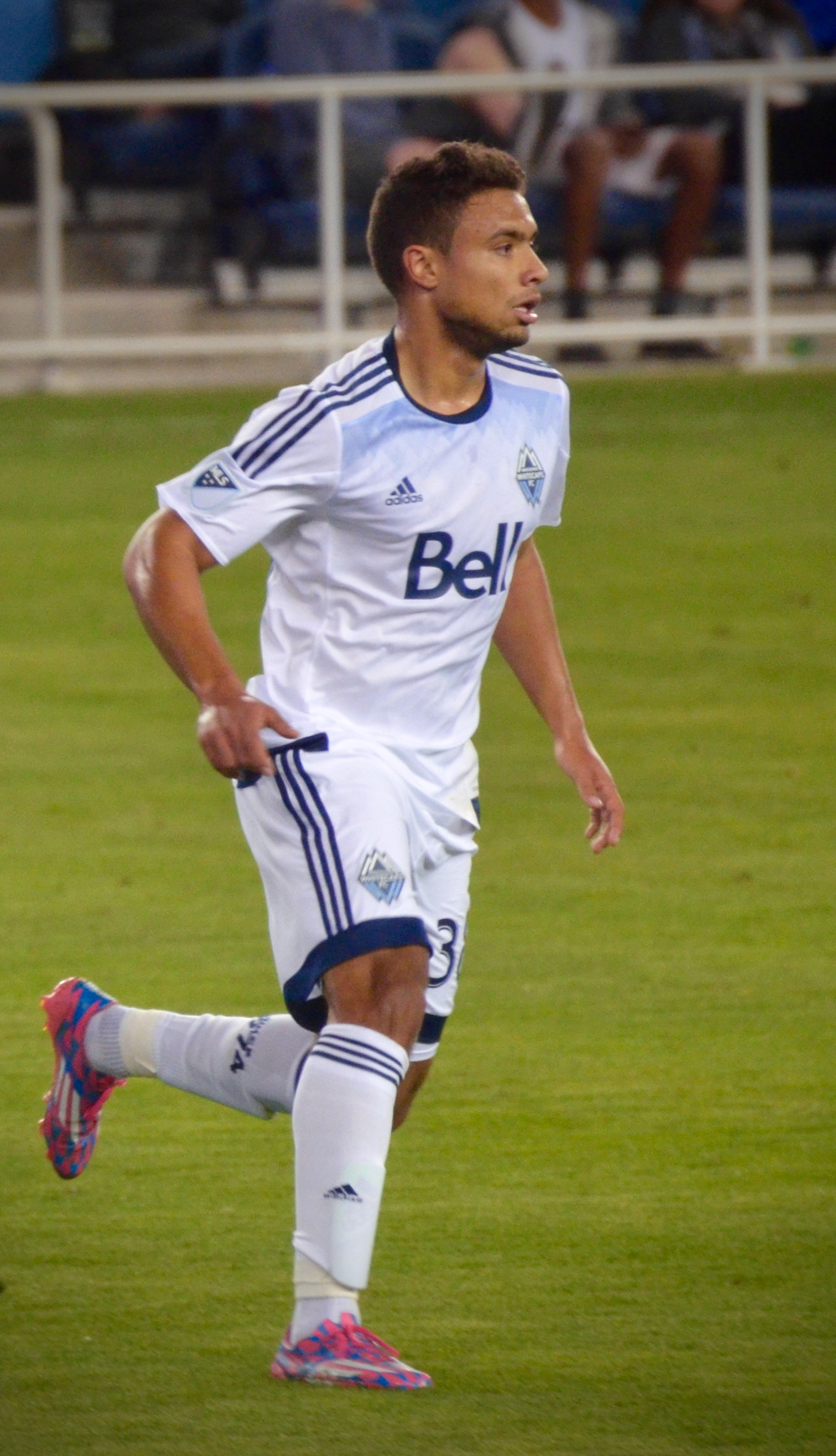
- Froese playing for the Whitecaps in 2015

Personal information
- Full name: Kianz González-Froese
- Date of birth: April 16, 1996 (age 30)
- Place of birth: Havana, Cuba
- Height: 1.77 m (5 ft 10 in)
- Position: Attacking midfielder

Team information
- Current team: Gżira United

Youth career
- Garden City CC
- Portage Trails SC
- 2012–2014: Vancouver Whitecaps FC

Senior career*
Years	Team	Apps	(Gls)
2012–2014	Vancouver Whitecaps U23	15	(3)
2014–2016	Vancouver Whitecaps FC	15	(1)
2015–2016	→ Whitecaps FC 2 (loan)	19	(2)
2017–2019	Fortuna Düsseldorf II	55	(17)
2019–2021	1. FC Saarbrücken	48	(3)
2021–2022	TSV Havelse	32	(5)
2022–2024	SV Wehen Wiesbaden	55	(7)
2025	Valour FC	14	(3)
2026	Semen Padang	17	(1)
2026–	Gżira United	0	(0)

International career
2011	Cuba U17	3	(0)
2012–2013	Canada U17	5	(0)
2014–2015	Canada U20	8	(1)
2015–2016	Canada	2	(0)
- * Club domestic league appearances and goals as of 23 May 2026

Kianz González-Froese (born April 16, 1996) is a professional soccer player who plays as an attacking midfielder for Gżira United in the Maltese Premier League. Born in Cuba, he has played for the Canada national team.

== Early life ==
Froese was born to a father from Saskatchewan, Canada and a mother from La Habana, Cuba. He moved to Winnipeg, Manitoba at the age of one. He began playing youth soccer at the age of four with Garden City Community Centre. Froese also played for Portage Trails SC, where his success earned him a spot on the Manitoba provincial team and as well as the National Training Camp (NTC) program. After a training stint with FC Edmonton, he joined the Vancouver Whitecaps FC Academy in 2012.

== Club career ==
=== Vancouver Whitecaps FC ===
Froese spent the 2012 season with Vancouver Whitecaps FC U-23 in the USL Premier Development League.

Froese made his first team debut with Vancouver Whitecaps FC in a 2–1 defeat to Toronto FC in the first leg of the Canadian Championship semifinals. On September 14, 2014, he officially signed with Vancouver as a Homegrown Player. He made his MLS regular season debut for the Whitecaps against the Seattle Sounders FC on October 10, 2014.

He scored his first MLS goal against the New York Red Bulls on June 20, 2015. Froese scored his second goal for Vancouver in a 1–0 home win against Honduran side C.D. Olimpia in the 2015–16 CONCACAF Champions League group stage.

=== Germany ===
Froese was sold to Fortuna Düsseldorf in February 2017. He signed a first-team deal in December 2017. After 2.5 years with Fortuna Düsseldorf II, Froese left the club at the end of the 2018–19 season.

In July 2019, Froese signed with Regionalliga side 1. FC Saarbrücken. At the end of the 2019–20 Regionalliga campaign, Saarbrücken clinched promotion to the 3. Liga. In May 2021 it was announced Froese would be departing Saarbrücken at the end of their season.

In August 2021, Froese was signed by 3. Liga side TSV Havelse.

In June 2022, Froese signed with fellow 3. Liga side Wehen Wiesbaden on a two-year contract.

=== Return to Canada ===
In June 2025, he signed with Valour FC in the Canadian Premier League for the remainder of the 2025 season, with an option for 2026.

=== Indonesia ===
In December 2025, he signed with Indonesian Super League club Semen Padang.

=== Malta ===
In November 2026, he signed with Maltese Premier League club Gżira United.

== International career ==
Froese represented his country of birth, Cuba, at the 2011 CONCACAF U-17 Championship. However, in April 2012 he switched his allegiance to Canada. On October 3, 2013, he was named to Canada's under-17 squad for the 2013 FIFA U-17 World Cup. He made three appearances during the tournament. He was also called into Canada national team camp on January 10, 2014. In the summer of 2014, Froese joined the U-20s for the 2014 Milk Cup. In January 2015, Froese was named to the Canadian squad that would participate at the 2015 CONCACAF U-20 Championship. He scored a goal against El Salvador in a 3–2 loss during the tournament.

Froese received his first cap for the senior side against Ghana on October 14, 2015.

== Career statistics ==
As of October 27, 2025

Appearances and goals by club, season and competition
Club	Season	League			Playoffs		Cup		Continental		Other		Total	
Club	Season	Division	Apps	Goals	Apps	Goals	Apps	Goals	Apps	Goals	Apps	Goals	Apps	Goals
Vancouver Whitecaps FC	2014	Major League Soccer	1	0	0	0	1	0	—		—		2	0
Vancouver Whitecaps FC	2015	Major League Soccer	9	1	0	0	2	0	4	1	—		15	2
Vancouver Whitecaps FC	2016	Major League Soccer	5	0	—		1	0	1	0	—		7	0
Vancouver Whitecaps FC	Total		15	1	0	0	4	0	5	0	0	0	24	1
Whitecaps FC 2	2015	USL	6	1	—		—		—		—		6	1
Whitecaps FC 2	2016	USL	13	1	3	2	—		—		—		16	3
Whitecaps FC 2	Total		19	2	3	2	0	0	0	0	0	0	22	4
Fortuna Düsseldorf II	2016–17	Regionalliga West	14	7	—		—		—		—		14	7
Fortuna Düsseldorf II	2017–18	Regionalliga West	19	3	—		—		—		—		19	3
Fortuna Düsseldorf II	2018–19	Regionalliga West	22	7	—		—		—		—		22	7
Fortuna Düsseldorf II	Total		55	17	0	0	0	0	0	0	0	0	55	17
1. FC Saarbrücken	2019–20	Regionalliga Südwest	19	1	—		5	0	—		—		24	1
1. FC Saarbrücken	2020–21	3. Liga	29	2	—		0	0	—		—		29	2
1. FC Saarbrücken	Total		48	3	0	0	5	0	0	0	0	0	53	3
TSV Havelse	2021–22	3. Liga	32	5	—		0	0	—		—		32	5
Wehen Wiesbaden	2022–23	3. Liga	33	6	—		0	0	—		2 (Note: Appearance(s) in promotion/relegation playoffs)	0	35	6
Wehen Wiesbaden	2023–24	2. Bundesliga	22	1	—		0	0	—		1	0	23	1
Wehen Wiesbaden	Total		55	7	0	0	0	0	0	0	3	0	58	7
Valour FC	2025	Canadian Premier League	14	3	—		1	0	—		—		15	3
Career total			238	38	3	2	10	0	5	0	3	0	259	40
