= Florian Riedel =

German footballer (born 1990)

Personal information
- Date of birth: 9 April 1990 (age 36)
- Place of birth: Werdau, East Germany
- Height: 1.76 m (5 ft 9 in)
- Position: Right-back

Youth career
- Rot-Weiß Werdau
- FSV Zwickau
- 2005–2008: Hertha BSC

Senior career*
| Years | Team | Apps | (Gls) |
| 2007–2010 | Hertha BSC II | 42 | (3) |
| 2008–2010 | Hertha BSC | 0 | (0) |
| 2010–2011 | AGOVV | 25 | (0) |
| 2011–2012 | VfL Osnabrück | 21 | (0) |
| 2012–2015 | 1. FC Kaiserslautern | 13 | (1) |
| 2014–2015 | 1. FC Kaiserslautern II | 3 | (0) |
| 2015–2017 | Eintracht Trier | 43 | (0) |
| 2017–2018 | Viktoria Berlin | 32 | (1) |
| 2018–2021 | VfB Lübeck | 76 | (4) |
| 2021–2026 | TSV Havelse | 160 | (5) |
| Total | | 415 | (14) |
- * Club domestic league appearances and goals

Florian Riedel (born 9 April 1990) is a German former professional footballer who played as a right-back.

== Career ==
Riedel was born in Werdau, East Germany. He started his professional career with Hertha BSC, making his first appearance on 31 July 2008 in the 2008–09 UEFA Cup first qualifying round second leg against Nistru Otaci. He was substituted on in the 63rd minute. On 31 August 2010, the last day of the transfer window, Riedel left Hertha BSC, having been relegated to the reserves, and joined Dutch club AGOVV Apeldoorn.

In summer 2012, Riedel joined 1. FC Kaiserslautern. After 12 appearances in the 2. Bundesliga and after playing mostly for the reserves, he was released from his contract in summer 2015.

On 19 January 2016, Riedel signed for Eintracht Trier until June 2017.
