= Nils Piwernetz =

German association football player

Personal information
- Date of birth: 3 April 2000 (age 26)
- Place of birth: Nuremberg, Germany
- Height: 1.76 m (5 ft 9 in)
- Position: Midfielder

Team information
- Current team: 1. FC Schweinfurt 05
- Number: 19

Youth career
- –2007: SV Schwaig
- 2007–2019: 1. FC Nürnberg

Senior career*
Years	Team	Apps	(Gls)
2019–2021	1. FC Nürnberg II	21	(1)
2021–2022	TSV Havelse	15	(0)
2022–2023	TSV Aubstadt	27	(0)
2023–	1. FC Schweinfurt 05	65	(1)
- * Club domestic league appearances and goals as of 27 September 2026

Nils Piwernetz (born 3 April 2000) is a German footballer who plays as a midfielder for 1. FC Schweinfurt 05.

== Career ==
Piwernetz made his professional debut for TSV Havelse in the 3. Liga on 25 August 2021 against Türkgücü München.
