= Niklas Tasky =

German association football player

Personal information
- Date of birth: 11 February 1991 (age 35)
- Place of birth: Hanover, Germany
- Height: 1.94 m (6 ft 4 in)
- Position: Defender

Team information
- Current team: SV Ramlingen/Ehlershausen

Youth career
- –2008: Hannover 96

Senior career*
Years	Team	Apps	(Gls)
2009–2011	SC Langenhagen		
2011–2012	TSV Havelse	32	(2)
2012–2014	1. FC Kaiserslautern II	61	(2)
2014	VfR Mannheim	7	(0)
2015	FC Nöttingen	11	(0)
2015–2016	SpVgg Neckarelz	18	(1)
2017	TSV Havelse	29	(2)
2017	Lynn Fighting Knights		
2018	TSV Havelse	10	(0)
2018	Lynn Fighting Knights		
2019–2025	TSV Havelse	131	(9)
2025–	SV Ramlingen/Ehlershausen	0	(0)
- * Club domestic league appearances and goals as of 1 July 2025

Niklas Tasky (born 11 February 1991) is a German footballer who plays as a centre-back for SV Ramlingen/Ehlershausen.

== Career ==
Tasky made his professional debut for TSV Havelse in the 3. Liga on 24 July 2021 against 1. FC Saarbrücken.
