= Tobias Fölster =

German association football player

Personal information
- Date of birth: 30 January 1994 (age 32)
- Place of birth: Kiel, Germany
- Height: 1.89 m (6 ft 2 in)
- Position: Centre-back

Team information
- Current team: SpVg. Eidertal Molfsee

Youth career
- –2010: Holstein Kiel
- 2010–2013: Hannover 96

Senior career*
Years	Team	Apps	(Gls)
2012–2015	Hannover 96 II	40	(4)
2015–2022	TSV Havelse	160	(12)
2022–2024	SC Weiche 08	51	(1)
2024–	SpVg. Eidertal Molfsee	0	(0)
- * Club domestic league appearances and goals as of 18 May 2024

Tobias Fölster (born 30 January 1994) is a German footballer who plays as a centre-back for Oberliga Schleswig-Holstein club SpVg. Eidertal Molfsee.

== Career ==
Fölster made his professional debut for TSV Havelse in the 3. Liga on 24 July 2021 against 1. FC Saarbrücken.
