= Torben Engelking =

German footballer (born 1996)

Personal information
- Date of birth: 28 June 1996 (age 30)
- Place of birth: Stadthagen, Germany
- Height: 1.79 m (5 ft 10 in)
- Position: Left winger

Team information
- Current team: TSV Havelse
- Number: 16

Youth career
- 2000–2010: VfL Bad Nenndorf
- 2010–2012: TSV Havelse
- 2012–2015: Germania Egestorf/Langreder

Senior career*
Years	Team	Apps	(Gls)
2015–2019	Germania Egestorf/Langreder	92	(20)
2019–	TSV Havelse	119	(17)
- * Club domestic league appearances and goals as of 10 June 2025

Torben Engelking (born 28 June 1996) is a German footballer who plays as a left winger for Regionalliga Nord club TSV Havelse.

== Career ==
Engelking made his professional debut for TSV Havelse in the 3. Liga on 14 January 2022 against MSV Duisburg, coming on in the 78th minute as a substitute for Nils Piwernetz.
