= Julius Langfeld =

German footballer (born 1995)

Personal information
- Date of birth: 18 February 1995 (age 31)
- Place of birth: Minden, Germany
- Height: 1.87 m (6 ft 2 in)
- Position: Right winger

Team information
- Current team: Gütersloh
- Number: 10

Youth career
- –2014: SVKT07

Senior career*
Years	Team	Apps	(Gls)
2014–2015	SVKT07		
2015–2017	Rot-Weiß Maaslingen		
2018–2024	TSV Havelse	149	(22)
2024–2025	Paderborn II	32	(10)
2025–	Gütersloh	36	(8)
- * Club domestic league appearances and goals as of 23 September 2026

Julius Langfeld (born 18 February 1995) is a German footballer who plays as a right winger for Regionalliga West club Gütersloh.

== Career ==
Langfeld made his professional debut for TSV Havelse in the 3. Liga on 24 July 2021 against 1. FC Saarbrücken.
