= Serhat Koruk =

German footballer

Personal information
- Full name: Serhat Zübeyr Koruk
- Date of birth: 4 May 1996 (age 30)
- Place of birth: Cologne, Germany
- Height: 1.83 m (6 ft 0 in)
- Position: Forward

Team information
- Current team: Bonner SC
- Number: 9

Youth career
- –2012: Fortuna Köln
- 2013: Bonner SC
- 2013–2014: Sportfreunde Troisdorf
- 2014–2015: Fortuna Köln

Senior career*
Years	Team	Apps	(Gls)
2015	Fortuna Köln II	8	(7)
2015–2017	Fortuna Köln	14	(0)
2017–2018	Sancaktepe	24	(7)
2018–2019	Tuzlaspor	7	(1)
2019	→ Diyarbakırspor (loan)	13	(1)
2019	Diyarbakırspor	3	(0)
2020	Bayrampaşa	3	(0)
2020–2021	Bergisch Gladbach	39	(20)
2021	SV Meppen	15	(1)
2022	SC Verl	7	(0)
2022	SV Straelen	4	(0)
2023	Schwarz-Weiß Rehden	2	(0)
2023–2024	Rot Weiss Ahlen	14	(1)
2024–	Bonner SC	64	(35)
- * Club domestic league appearances and goals as of 24 June 2026

Serhat Zübeyr Koruk (born 4 May 1996) is a German professional footballer who plays as a forward for Bonner SC.

== Career ==
In January 2022 Koruk agreed to the termination of his contract with 3. Liga club SV Meppen for "personal reasons".

On 18 January 2022, Koruk signed with SC Verl.
