= Tobias Gunte =

German footballer (born 1997)

Personal information
- Date of birth: 11 April 1997 (age 29)
- Place of birth: Berlin, Germany
- Height: 1.95 m (6 ft 5 in)
- Position: Defender

Team information
- Current team: BFC Dynamo
- Number: 22

Youth career
- –2016: Lichtenrader BC 25
- 2006–2016: Viktoria Berlin

Senior career*
Years	Team	Apps	(Gls)
2016–2023	Viktoria Berlin	133	(7)
2023–2025	VSG Altglienicke	52	(1)
2025–	BFC Dynamo	35	(4)
- * Club domestic league appearances and goals as of 23 September 2026

Tobias Gunte (born 11 April 1997) is a German professional footballer who plays as a defender for Regionalliga Nordost club BFC Dynamo.
