= Patrick Kapp =

German footballer

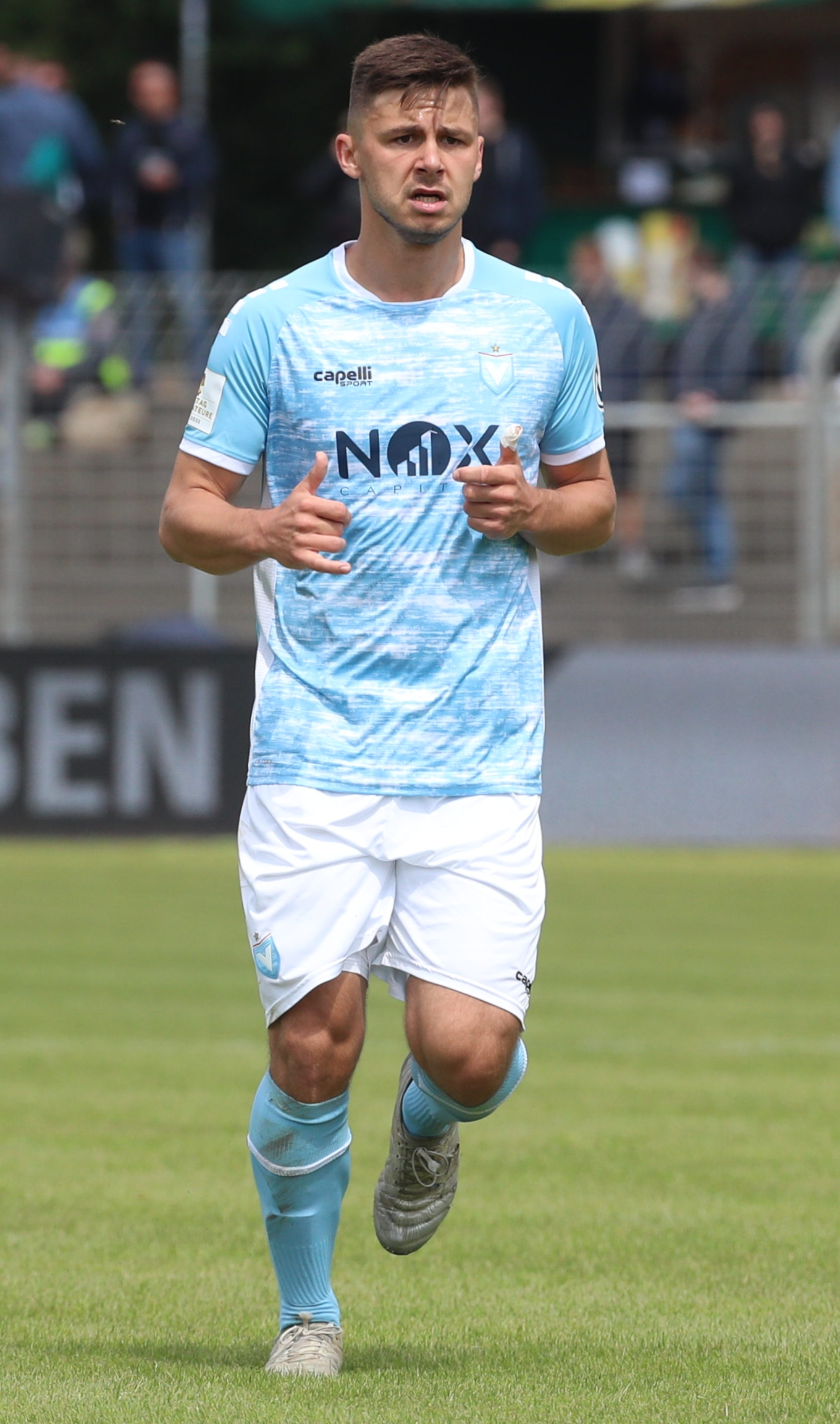
- Kapp in 2022 with Viktoria Berlin

Personal information
- Full name: Patrick Wolfgang Kapp
- Date of birth: 20 July 1997 (age 29)
- Place of birth: Illertissen, Germany
- Height: 1.80 m (5 ft 11 in)
- Position: Defender

Team information
- Current team: Erzgebirge Aue
- Number: 16

Youth career
- 2011: TSG Balingen
- 2011–2016: 1899 Hoffenheim

Senior career*
| Years | Team | Apps | (Gls) |
| 2016–2017 | 1899 Hoffenheim II | 9 | (0) |
| 2017–2018 | Sochaux II | 15 | (0) |
| 2018 | Sochaux | 2 | (0) |
| 2018–2022 | Viktoria Berlin | 86 | (8) |
| 2022–2024 | VfB Stuttgart II | 37 | (2) |
| 2024–2026 | VSG Altglienicke | 67 | (5) |
| 2026– | Erzgebirge Aue | 10 | (2) |
- * Club domestic league appearances and goals as of 23 September 2026

Patrick Wolfgang Kapp (born 20 July 1997) is a German professional footballer who plays as a defender for Erzgebirge Aue.

== Career ==
On 19 June 2017, Kapp signed with FC Sochaux-Montbéliard, joining from the youth academy of 1899 Hoffenheim where he captained their academy sides. Kapp made his professional debut for Sochaux in a 1–1 Ligue 2 tie with Chamois Niortais on 30 March 2018.
