= Noah Plume =

German footballer

Personal information
- Date of birth: 18 August 1996 (age 30)
- Place of birth: Neustadt am Rübenberge, Germany
- Height: 1.87 m (6 ft 2 in)
- Position: Defensive midfielder

Youth career
- –2006: JSG Bordenau/Poggenhagen
- 2006–2010: Hannover 96
- 2010–2014: TSV Havelse

Senior career*
Years	Team	Apps	(Gls)
2014–2018	TSV Havelse	100	(14)
2018–2019	Sportfreunde Lotte	1	(0)
2019	→ TSV Havelse (loan)	13	(4)
2019–2022	TSV Havelse	64	(8)
2022–2023	VfB Lübeck	31	(1)
2023–2024	VfB Oldenburg	23	(1)
2024–2026	TSV Havelse	54	(1)
- * Club domestic league appearances and goals as of 1 July 2026

Noah Plume (born 18 August 1996) is a German footballer who last played as a defensive midfielder for TSV Havelse.

== Career ==
On 14 May 2018, it was announced that Plume would join Sportfreunde Lotte from TSV Havelse on a two-year contract. He returned to Havelse on loan until the end of the season on 31 January 2019.

On 10 May 2022, it was announced that Plume would join VfB Lübeck on a two-year contract.

On 1 September 2023, Plume joined VfB Oldenburg in Regionalliga.

On 24 June 2024, Plume returned to TSV Havelse.
