= Oliver Schmitt (footballer) =

German footballer

Personal information
- Full name: Oliver Issa Schmitt
- Date of birth: 4 June 2000 (age 26)
- Place of birth: Cologne, Germany
- Height: 1.80 m (5 ft 11 in)
- Position: Midfielder

Team information
- Current team: SV Meppen
- Number: 7

Youth career
- –2007: SV Deutz 05
- 2007–2019: 1. FC Köln

Senior career*
Years	Team	Apps	(Gls)
2019–2025	1. FC Köln II	104	(24)
2021–2022	→ SC Verl (loan)	11	(1)
2022–2023	→ Hessen Kassel (loan)	8	(2)
2025–	SV Meppen	29	(16)
- * Club domestic league appearances and goals as of 20 June 2026

Oliver Issa Schmitt (born 4 June 2000) is a German professional footballer who plays as a midfielder for Regionalliga Nord club SV Meppen.

== Career ==
Born in Cologne, Schmitt played youth football for SV Deutz 05 before joining 1. FC Köln in 2007. He made his senior debut for 1. FC Köln II in a 1–0 win over Fortuna Köln on 27 July 2019. In June 2021, he signed a new three-year contract with the club and joined 3. Liga side SC Verl on a two-year loan deal. On 28 January 2022, the loan was terminated early.
