= Vico Meien =

German footballer (born 1998)

Personal information
- Date of birth: 15 March 1998 (age 28)
- Place of birth: Bergen auf Rügen, Germany
- Height: 1.86 m (6 ft 1 in)
- Position: Defensive midfielder

Team information
- Current team: VfR Aalen
- Number: 27

Youth career
- –2016: Hansa Rostock
- 2016–2017: Holstein Kiel

Senior career*
Years	Team	Apps	(Gls)
2017–2019	Eintracht Norderstedt	38	(3)
2019–2022	TSV Havelse	28	(1)
2022–2024	VfR Aalen	65	(5)
2024–2025	Stuttgarter Kickers	6	(0)
2025–	VfR Aalen	32	(7)
- * Club domestic league appearances and goals as of 30 June 2026

Vico Meien (born 15 March 1998) is a German footballer who plays as a defensive midfielder for Regionalliga Südwest club VfR Aalen.

== Career ==
Meien made his professional debut for TSV Havelse in the 3. Liga on 24 July 2021 against 1. FC Saarbrücken.

After TSV Havelse was relegated, Meien signed with VfR Aalen in the Regionalliga Südwest ahead of the 2022–23 season, signing a contract until June 2024. He immediately became a regular starter and helped the team fight against relegation. While Aalen narrowly avoided relegation in his first season, they finished in a relegation position at the end of the 2023–24 campaign. Despite this, the season ended on a positive note when Aalen won the 2023–24 Württemberg Cup (Verbandspokal) by defeating SG Sonnenhof Großaspach 4–1 in the final, securing qualification for the 2024–25 DFB-Pokal.

Following the expiration of his contract, Meien left Aalen after 75 total appearances and joined Stuttgarter Kickers, who had finished second in the Regionalliga Südwest in 2024.

== Honours ==
VfR Aalen

- Württemberg Cup: 2023–24
