= Leon Damer =

German footballer (born 2000)

Personal information
- Date of birth: 31 January 2000 (age 26)
- Place of birth: Hanover, Germany
- Height: 1.76 m (5 ft 9 in)
- Position: Winger

Team information
- Current team: KSV Hessen Kassel
- Number: 13

Youth career
- –2011: TSV Berenbostel
- 2011–2019: Hannover 96

Senior career*
Years	Team	Apps	(Gls)
2019–2022	TSV Havelse	62	(8)
2022–2023	Hallescher FC	21	(0)
2023–2026	Chemnitzer FC	91	(13)
2026–	KSV Hessen Kassel	7	(3)
- * Club domestic league appearances and goals as of 24 September 2026

Leon Damer (born 31 January 2000) is a German professional footballer who plays as a winger for Regionalliga club KSV Hessen Kassel.

== Career ==
Damer made his professional debut for TSV Havelse in the 3. Liga on 5 September 2021 against Borussia Dortmund II.

On 9 May 2022, Damer signed a two-year contract with Hallescher FC, joining the club from the 2022–23 season.

On 1 September 2023, Damer signed with Chemnitzer FC.
