= Wilhelm-Langrehr-Stadion =

Football stadium in Garbsen, Germany

Coordinates: 52°24′30″N 9°36′8″E

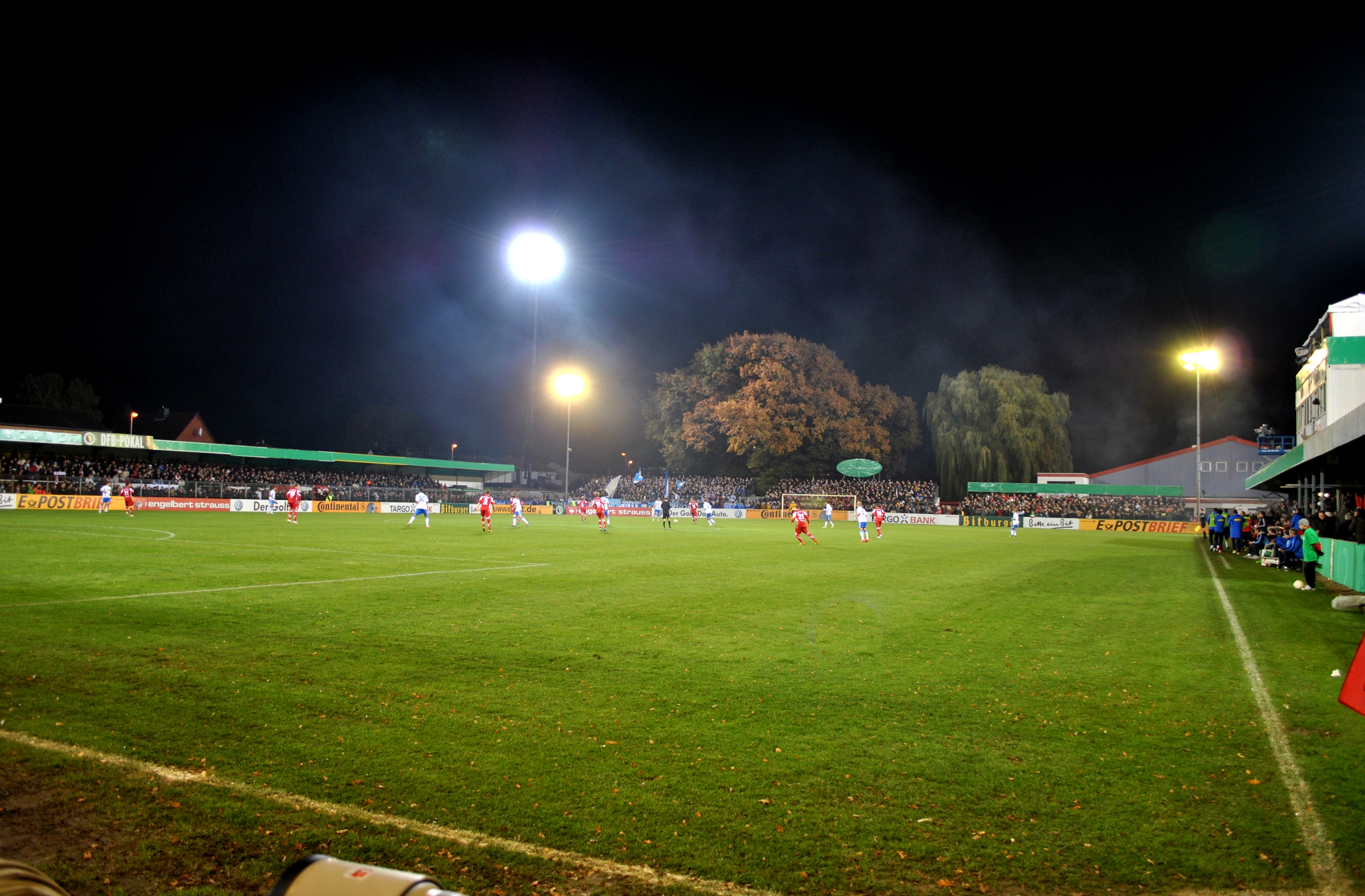
- Interactive map of Wilhelm-Langrehr-Stadion
- Former names: TSV-Kampfbahn an der Hannoverschen Straße (1933–2000)
- Location: Garbsen, Lower Saxony
- Capacity: 3,500

Construction
- Opened: 1933
- Renovated: 1990; 1992; 2010

Tenants
- TSV Havelse

Wilhelm-Langrehr-Stadion is a football stadium in the Havelse district of the Lower Saxon town of Garbsen. It is home to Regionalliga side TSV Havelse.

The stadium has a capacity of 3,500.

== History ==
TSV Havelse have played at Wilhelm-Langrehr-Stadion since 1933.

However, the stadium does not meet the requirements for the 3. Liga; therefore, TSV Havelse will play their home matches at the HDI-Arena in Hanover after being promoted to the 2021–22 3. Liga.
