= Julian Rufidis =

German footballer (born 2000)

Personal information
- Date of birth: 6 July 2000 (age 26)
- Place of birth: Hanover, Germany
- Height: 1.84 m (6 ft 0 in)
- Position: Midfielder

Youth career
- –2015: TSV Havelse
- 2015–2019: Hannover 96

Senior career*
| Years | Team | Apps | (Gls) |
| 2019 | Hannover 96 II | 0 | (0) |
| 2019–2026 | TSV Havelse | 121 | (5) |
- * Club domestic league appearances and goals as of 1 July 2026

Julian Rufidis (born 6 July 2000) is a German footballer who last played as a midfielder for Regionalliga Nord club TSV Havelse.

== Career ==
Rufidis made his professional debut for TSV Havelse in the 3. Liga on 14 August 2021 against 1. FC Magdeburg.
