= Yannik Jaeschke =

German footballer (born 1993)

Personal information
- Date of birth: 20 October 1993 (age 33)
- Place of birth: Nienburg, Germany
- Height: 1.84 m (6 ft 0 in)
- Position: Centre-forward

Team information
- Current team: SVV Hülsen

Youth career
- SV Sebbenhausen-Balge
- –2004: SCB Langendamm
- 2004–2012: Werder Bremen

Senior career*
Years	Team	Apps	(Gls)
2012–2013	Werder Bremen II	5	(0)
2013–2015	SV Rödinghausen	7	(2)
2015–2017	TuS Erndtebrück	12	(1)
2017–2026	TSV Havelse	192	(47)
2026–	SVV Hülsen	0	(0)
- * Club domestic league appearances and goals as of 1 July 2026

Yannik Jaeschke (born 20 October 1993) is a German professional footballer who plays as a centre-forward for SVV Hülsen.

== Career ==
Jaeschke made his professional debut for TSV Havelse in the 3. Liga on 24 July 2021 against 1. FC Saarbrücken.
