= Semi Belkahia =

German footballer

Personal information
- Date of birth: 22 December 1998 (age 27)
- Place of birth: Munich, Germany
- Height: 1.92 m (6 ft 4 in)
- Position: Centre-back

Team information
- Current team: TSV Havelse
- Number: 4

Youth career
- ESV München-Ost
- –2014: Bayern Munich
- 2014–2017: 1899 Hoffenheim

Senior career*
Years	Team	Apps	(Gls)
2017–2018	VfR Garching	25	(3)
2018–2023	1860 Munich	73	(5)
2018	1860 Munich II	11	(1)
2023–2025	Arminia Bielefeld	15	(1)
2025–	TSV Havelse	31	(3)
- * Club domestic league appearances and goals as of 16 July 2026

Semi Belkahia (born 22 December 1998) is a German professional footballer who plays as a centre-back for TSV Havelse.

== Personal life ==
Belkahia was born in Munich, Bavaria and is of Tunisian descent.

== Career ==
Belkahia made his professional debut for 1860 Munich on 8 April 2019, coming on as a substitute in the 89th minute for Dennis Dressel in the 1–0 away loss against Sonnenhof Großaspach.

In June 2023, Belkahia signed for recently relegated 3. Liga club Arminia Bielefeld. He was released in summer 2025.

On 12 September 2025, Belkahia joined TSV Havelse in the 3. Liga.

== Honours ==
Arminia Bielefeld

- 3. Liga: 2024–25
