= Norman Quindt =

German footballer (born 1996)

Personal information
- Date of birth: 2 November 1996 (age 30)
- Place of birth: Hamelin, Germany
- Height: 1.84 m (6 ft 0 in)
- Position: Goalkeeper

Team information
- Current team: TSV Havelse
- Number: 29

Youth career
- TuS Hessisch Oldendorf
- –2013: Hannover 96
- 2013–2015: Carl Zeiss Jena

Senior career*
Years	Team	Apps	(Gls)
2015–2017	SV Rödinghausen	1	(0)
2017–2018	TSG Neustrelitz	26	(0)
2018–2019	Sportfreunde Lotte	0	(0)
2019	Union Fürstenwalde		
2020–2022	TSV Havelse	48	(0)
2023	TSV Havelse	13	(0)
2023	Würzburger Kickers	1	(0)
2024–2025	Hannover 96 II	1	(0)
2025	Kickers Emden	15	(0)
2026–	TSV Havelse	11	(0)
- * Club domestic league appearances and goals as of 30 May 2026

Norman Quindt (born 2 November 1996) is a German footballer who plays as a goalkeeper for TSV Havelse.

== Career ==
Quindt made his professional debut for TSV Havelse in the 3. Liga on 24 July 2021 against 1. FC Saarbrücken.

In July 2023, Quindt moved to Regionalliga Bayern club Würzburger Kickers. After only six months at the club, and one league appearance, he left the club.

On 26 July 2024, Quindt joined 3. Liga club Hannover 96 II.

On 31 May 2025, Kickers Emden announced the signing of Quindt. He returned to TSV Havelse on 14 January 2026.
