= Garbsen =

- Town
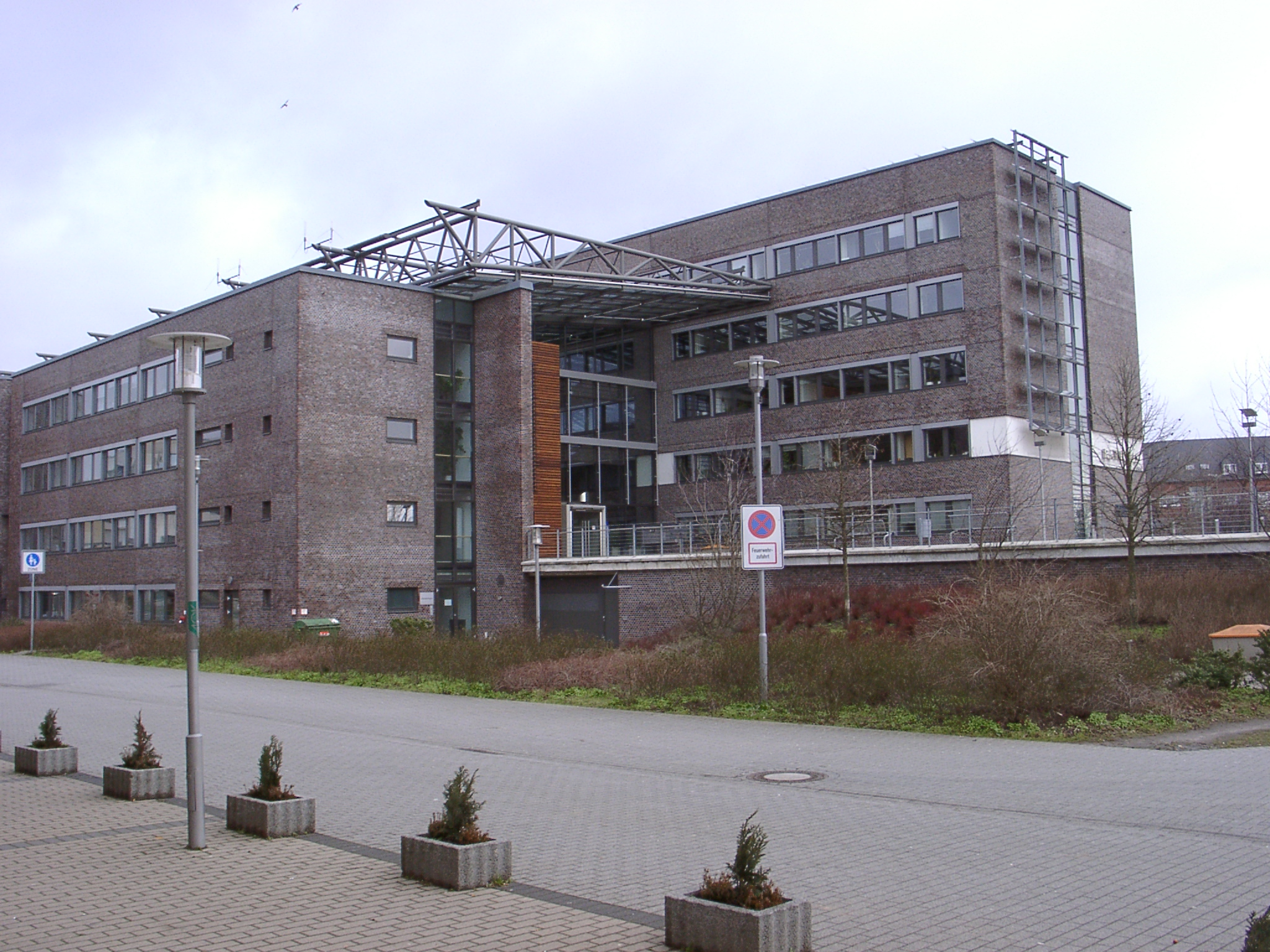
- Town hall

- Coat of arms

- Location of Garbsen within Hanover district
- Interactive map of Garbsen
- Location within Germany Location within Lower Saxony
- Coordinates: 52°25′06″N 09°35′53″E
- Country: Germany
- State: Lower Saxony
- District: Hanover
- Subdivisions: 13 districts

Government
  - Mayor (2021–26): Claudio Provenzano (SPD)

Area
  - Total: 79.49 km^{2} (30.69 sq mi)
- Elevation: 50 m (160 ft)

Population (2025-12-31)
  - Total: 60,007
  - Density: 754.9/km^{2} (1,955/sq mi)
- Time zone: UTC+01:00 (CET)
  - Summer (DST): UTC+02:00 (CEST)
- Postal codes: 30823, 30826, 30827
- Dialling codes: 05131, 05137, 0511, 05031, 05032
- Vehicle registration: H
- Website: www.garbsen.de

Garbsen (German pronunciation: [ˈɡaʁpsn̩]) is a town in the district of Hanover, in Lower Saxony, Germany. It is situated on the river Leine, approximately 11 kilometres (6.8 mi) northwest of Hanover. The name Garbsen can be traced back to 1223. Today's 13 city districts have partly developed independently until the city of Garbsen was formed within its current boundaries during the regional reform in 1974.

In the course of industrialization and especially after the Second World War, the population of Garbsen and its predecessor municipalities increased significantly. In 1963, the current district Auf der Horst was created as a residential and working class district for up to 10,000 residents. Originally planned by the state capital Hannover, Auf der Horst became an important factor for the independent urban development of Garbsen in the following years.

In the first decades of the post-war period, Garbsen was primarily a classic commuter town for numerous workers in Hanover's industrial enterprises such as VW Nutzfahrzeuge, Continental or VARTA, today Johnson Controls. Since then Garbsen has experienced a significant change in the economic structure. Predominantly medium-size enterprises from different industries were created or settled, the number of the jobs more than doubled itself.

With the Production Technology Center (PZH) and the Underwater Technology Center, Garbsen is home to significant parts of the Mechanical Engineering Department of the Leibniz University of Hannover. By the winter semester 2019/2020, the entire Faculty of Mechanical Engineering is to be united on the Garbsen campus, which is currently under construction.

== Geography ==
Garbsen belongs to the Weser-Aller-Flachland natural area and is situated between the lowlands of the river Leine and the Otternhagener Moor. The differences in altitude are only a few metres.

=== Division of the town ===
The town consists of 13 districts:

- Altgarbsen
- Auf der Horst
- Berenbostel
- Frielingen
- Garbsen-Mitte
- Havelse
- Heitlingen
- Horst
- Meyenfeld
- Osterwald Oberende
- Osterwald Unterende
- Schloss Ricklingen
- Stelingen

=== Geology ===
The soils in the city area are predominantly sandy or boggy (Moorgeest), with the exception of the loamy-clayey soils in the area of the Leine floodplain. The sandy to gravelly deposits are fluviatile formations of the last cold period, the Weichsel cold period, e.g. in the area of Altgarbsen and Havelse, as well as elsewhere, such as Frielingen and Meyenfeld, meltwater deposits partly with overlaying ground moraine of the Saale cold period (Drenthe stage). Furthermore, fine to medium sand dunes can be found in the area of Garbsen Switzerland and Ricklingen Castle. These dunes can also be found at the "Hexenturm" in the neighbouring Hinüberschen Garten and at the Glockenberg in the monastery forest of Marienwerder.

The sand was mined in several places in (old) Garbsen in the time beginning before the First World War until 1970 and was burned to lime sand bricks in the Garbsen hard stone works (Kiebitzmoor, "Garbsen", "Niedersachsen", "Hansa" and "Hannover"). Thus Garbsen's hills disappeared, and today only street names remind us of them (among them Osterberg, Mühlenberg, Streitberg, Pottberg). Sand and gravel for construction purposes were extracted in the pit of today's Blue Lake.

Near-surface clays and claystones of the Lower Cretaceous can be found in the area of the Berenbostel district. In the area of Berenbostel the marly claystones of marine origin belong to the formation of the Barremium and the Aptium, further north to Stelingen, Osterwald and Heitlingen the claystones belong to the formation of the Hauterivium. Since the middle of the 19th century the clays were also mined and used for brick production (Hannoversche Ziegelei at the Kastendamm: today Schwarzer See and Berenbosteler See, Flemmingsche Ziegelei in the field "Im Kolke": today backfilled (contaminated site) and built over as the Garbsen-Ost industrial area).

== Twin towns – sister cities ==
Garbsen is twinned with:

- Bassetlaw, England, United Kingdom
- Farmers Branch, United States
- Hérouville-Saint-Clair, France
- Schönebeck, Germany
- Września, Poland

== Notable people ==
- Volker Finke (born 1948), football player, teacher and football coach, 16 years for SC Freiburg
- Frank Pagelsdorf (born 1958), former football player and football coach
- Erdoğan Atalay (born 1966), actor in Alarm für Cobra 11 – Die Autobahnpolizei

== See also ==
- Metropolitan region Hannover-Braunschweig-Göttingen-Wolfsburg
