= TSV Havelse =

German football club

- Full name: Turn- und Sportverein Havelse 1912 e.V.
- Nickname: Pelikans
- Founded: 1912
- Ground: Eilenriedestadion
- Capacity: 5,001
- President: Manfred Hörnschemeyer.
- Manager: Samir Ferchichi
- League: 3. Liga
- 2025–26: 3. Liga, 17th of 20
- Website: www.tsv-havelse.de
Home colours	Away colours	Third colours

TSV Havelse is a German association football club based in Garbsen, Lower Saxony, near Hanover.

== History ==
The club was founded in 1912 as FC Pelikan-Havelse by a group of thirteen young men from the small village of Havelse. They took their name from the maker's brand of the first football purchased by the club for the grand sum of 7,50 Reichsmarks. World War I took a heavy toll on the club, which was inactive for a time. In 1929, a local gymnastics club, Turnverein Havelse was formed and four years later the "Pelikans" took to the field again as the club's football side. Some time during the 1930s – club records are not clear – the club took on its current name.

For most of its existence this has been un-storied local side: the highlight for the team was a single season spent in the 2. Bundesliga in 1990–91. From 1986 to 1990 the club was led by Volker Finke, who played with the team from 1969 to 1974, and then went on to become the longtime coach of SC Freiburg. Their biggest achievements in the DFB-Pokal came against the same team. In 1991 and 2012, the club eliminated 1. FC Nürnberg to advance to the third and second round respectively of the competition proper.

From 2010 the club played in the tier four Regionalliga Nord and finished in second place in 2013. They finished third in the shortened 2020–21 Regionalliga Nord to qualify for the promotion play-offs, as the top two teams, Weiche Flensburg and Werder Bremen II did not apply for 3. Liga licences. They achieved promotion to the 3. Liga after winning 2–0 on aggregate against 1. FC Schweinfurt. However, they were relegated after just one season, with their relegation being confirmed on 16 April 2022 after a 1–1 draw against Hallescher FC. The club returned to the 3. Liga for the 2025–26 season after finishing in first place in the 2024–25 Regionalliga Nord and winning the promotion play-offs against Lokomotive Leipzig.

== Stadium ==
TSV Havelse plays in the Wilhelm-Langrehr-Stadion, originally built as the "TSV-Kampfbahn an der Hannoverschen Straße" in 1933. However, since the stadium does not meet the requirements for the 3. Liga, the club played at the Heinz von Heiden Arena (then known as the HDI-Arena) in nearby Hanover for the duration of the 2021–22 season. They will mainly play at the Eilenriedestadion in Hanover during the 2025–26 season for the same reason, moving to the Heinz von Heiden Arena for high-risk matches.

== Honours ==
The club's honours:

- Oberliga Nord (III)
  - Champions: 1989
  - Runners-up: 1990
- Oberliga Niedersachsen-West
  - Champions: 2010
- Lower Saxony Cup
  - Winners: 2012, 2020

== Players ==
=== Current squad ===
As of 3 September 2026

Note: Flags indicate national team as defined under FIFA eligibility rules; some limited exceptions apply. Players may hold more than one non-FIFA nationality.

No.	Pos.	Nation	Player
1	GK	GER	Tom Opitz
3	DF	GER	Max Lamby
4	DF	GER	Semi Belkahia (captain)
5	MF	GER	Niklas Tauer
6	MF	HON	Leonardo Posadas
7	MF	GER	Marc Richter
8	MF	GER	Johann Berger
9	FW	GER	Lorenzo Paldino
10	MF	GER	Kevin Schumacher
11	FW	GHA	Kwasi Okyere Wriedt
12	MF	POL	Eryk Grzywacz (on loan from Holstein Kiel)
13	GK	ISR	Omer Hanin
14	MF	GER	Yusuf Wardak (on loan from Energie Cottbus)
15	DF	GER	Dennis Duah
16	FW	GER	Torben Engelking
17	FW	GER	Finn Kiszka
19	DF	GER	Eric Voufack (on loan from Kolding)

No.	Pos.	Nation	Player
20	FW	GER	Alexander Guiddir (on loan from Schalke 04 II)
21	DF	GER	Irichad Behrens
22	DF	GER	Leon Sommer-Deiss
23	MF	GER	Robin Müller
24	DF	GER	Yannick Mausehund (on loan from 1. FC Köln II)
25	GK	GER	Fynn Wolter
27	DF	GER	Donald Nduka
28	MF	GER	Robin Velasco
29	GK	GER	Norman Quindt
30	DF	AUT	Timo Friedrich
31	MF	GER	Jannik Oltrogge
32	MF	GER	Anton Hanke
33	MF	GER	Jesse Tugbenyo
35	MF	GHA	Joel Darko Ampem
36	MF	GER	Temilola Awoyale
38	FW	GER	Leon Švitek
39	GK	GER	Jannis Krug

=== Out on loan ===
Note: Flags indicate national team as defined under FIFA eligibility rules; some limited exceptions apply. Players may hold more than one non-FIFA nationality.

No.	Pos.	Nation	Player
—	MF	GER	Tyron Ohaji (at Eintracht Braunschweig II until 30 June 2027)

== Managerial history ==
- (Germany) Hans Siemensmeyer (1 July 1975 – 30 June 1984)
- (Germany) Günter Blume (1 July 1984 – 26 August 1985)
- (Germany) Gerd Behrens (26 August 1985 – 12 February 1986)
- (Germany) Volker Finke (13 February 1986 – 9 October 1990)
- (Germany) Karl-Heinz Mrosko (13 October 1990 – 30 June 1991)
- (Germany) Jürgen Stoffregen (1 July 1991 – 31 January 1993)
- (Germany) Uwe Kliemann (24 January 1993 – 30 June 1993)
- (Poland) Roman Wójcicki (1 July 1993 – 30 June 1995)
- unknown (1 July 1995 – 30 June 1997)
- (Germany) Karl Eggestein (1 July 1997 – 30 June 1998)
- (Germany) Frank Hartmann (1 July 1998 – 30 June 2000)
- (Germany) Ronnie Worm (1 July 2000 – 30 June 2001)
- (Germany) Bernd Krajewski (1 July 2001 – 30 June 2004)
- (Germany) Jürgen Stoffregen (1 July 2004 – 31 December 2010)
- (Germany) André Breitenreiter (2 January 2011 – 30 June 2013)
- (Germany) Christian Benbennek (1 July 2013 – 30 June 2015)
- (Germany) Stefan Gehrke (1 July 2015 – 23 September 2015)
- (Germany) Sören Halfar (int.) (24 September 2015 – 11 October 2015)
- (Germany) Alexander Kiene (12 October 2015 – 30 June 2017)
- (Germany) Christian Benbennek (1 July 2017 – 26 November 2018)
- (Germany) Sahin Kilic (int.) (27 November 2018 – 9 December 2018)
- (Germany) Jan Zimmermann (10 December 2018 – 30 June 2021)
- (Germany) Rüdiger Ziehl (1 July 2021 – 30 June 2022)
- (Germany) Philipp Gasde (1 July 2022 – 20 September 2022)
- (Germany) Samir Ferchichi (21 September 2022 – present)
