= 2025–26 VfL Osnabrück season =

VfL Osnabrück
2025–26 season
- Chairman: Holger Elixmann
- Manager: (Germany) Timo Schultz
- Stadium: Stadion an der Bremer Brücke
- 3. Liga: 1st (promoted)
colours	colours	colours

The 2025–26 season was VfL Osnabrück's 126th season in existence. The club participated in the 3. Liga.

== Players ==
As of 2 January 2026

Note: Flags indicate national team as defined under FIFA eligibility rules; some limited exceptions apply. Players may hold more than one non-FIFA nationality.

No.	Pos.	Nation	Player
1	GK	GER	Niklas Sauter
3	DF	DEN	Frederik Christensen (on loan from Brommapojkarna)
4	DF	TUR	Yiğit Karademir
6	MF	GER	Bryan Henning
7	DF	KOS	Bashkim Ajdini
8	MF	GER	Robert Tesche
9	FW	GER	Julian Kania (on loan from Arminia Bielefeld)
10	FW	GER	Kai Pröger
11	FW	GER	Robin Meißner (on loan from Dynamo Dresden)
13	MF	GER	Kevin Schumacher
14	FW	GER	Luc Ihorst
15	MF	DEN	Bjarke Jacobsen
18	FW	GER	Lars Kehl

No.	Pos.	Nation	Player
19	MF	GER	Kevin Wiethaup
20	DF	GER	Theo Janotta
21	GK	SWE	Lukas Jonsson
22	FW	GER	Bernd Riesselmann
23	MF	FRA	Tony Lesueur
24	DF	GER	Jannik Müller (captain)
25	DF	GER	Niklas Wiemann
26	MF	GER	Fridolin Wagner
27	DF	GER	Robin Fabinski
29	MF	POL	David Kopacz
31	MF	GER	Patrick Kammerbauer
35	GK	GER	Mats Remberg
37	FW	GER	Ismail Badjie

== Pre-season and friendlies ==
5 July 2025 Friendly	VfL Osnabrück (Germany)	0–1	(Czech Republic) Viktoria Plzeň	Jenbach
15:30		Report	Adu 17' (yellow card) 43'	Stadium: Jenbach Stadium

12 July 2025 Friendly	FC Gütersloh (Germany)	2–1	(Germany) VfL Osnabrück	Gütersloh
14:00	Luis Frieling 66'; Rother 72'	Report	Kehl 25' (pen.)	Stadium: Heidewaldstadion

16 July 2025 Friendly	SV Rödinghausen (Germany)	1–2	(Germany) VfL Osnabrück	Rödinghausen
14:00	Eduard Probst 51'	Report	Bernd Riesselmann 4'; Henning 16'	Stadium: Häcker-Wiehenstadion

20 July 2025 Friendly	VfL Osnabrück (Germany)	2–2	(Germany) SV Werder Bremen II	Osnabrück
14:00	Ismail Badjie 56'; Pröger 86'	Report	Niklas Stark 8'; Dominik Kasper 45'	Stadium: Stadion an der Bremer Brücke

26 July 2025 Friendly	VfL Osnabrück (Germany)	0–1	(Germany) Holstein Kiel	Osnabrück
13:30		Report		Stadium: Stadion an der Bremer Brücke

14 November 2025 Friendly	Sportfreunde Lotte (Germany)	2–2	(Germany) VfL Osnabrück	Lotte, Germany
12:00	Demaj 57' 70'	Report	Christensen 24'; Goguadze 26'	Stadium: Stadion am Lotter Kreuz

15 November 2025 Friendly	VfL Bochum (Germany)	1–4	(Germany) VfL Osnabrück	Bochum
12:00	Niklas Jahn 26'	Report	Ismail Badjie 36'; Lesueur 62'; Kopacz 79'; Kevin Wiethaup 87'	Stadium: Ruhrstadion

9 January 2026 Friendly	VfL Osnabrück (Germany)	5–2	(Germany) Rot-Weiß Oberhausen	Osnabrück
14:00	Bernd Riesselmann 8'; Kevin Wiethaup 14'; Schumacher 49'; Henning 56'; Niklas Wiemann 89'	Report	Yigit Karademir 34' (o.g.); Ilya Polyakov 37' (pen.)	Stadium: Stadion an der Bremer Brücke

10 January 2026 Friendly	VfL Osnabrück (Germany)	0–2	(Germany) Schalke 04	Osnabrück
14:15		Report	Sylla 61'; Younes 68'	Stadium: Stadion an der Bremer Brücke

== Competitions ==
Competition	First match	Last match	Starting round	Final position	Record							
Competition	First match	Last match	Starting round	Final position	Pld	W	D	L	GF	GA	GD	Win %
3. Liga	2 August 2025	16 May 2026	Matchday 1	1st	38	24	8	6	66	34	+32	63.16
Total					38	24	8	6	66	34	+32	63.16

Source: Soccerway

=== 3. Liga ===
==== League table ====
Pos	Team	Pld	W	D	L	GF	GA	GD	Pts	Promotion, qualification or relegation
1	VfL Osnabrück (C, P)	38	24	8	6	66	34	+32	80	Promotion to 2. Bundesliga and qualification for DFB-Pokal
2	Energie Cottbus (P)	38	21	9	8	72	51	+21	72	Promotion to 2. Bundesliga and qualification for DFB-Pokal
3	Rot-Weiss Essen	38	20	10	8	78	66	+12	70	Qualification for promotion play-offs and DFB-Pokal
4	MSV Duisburg	38	19	11	8	66	49	+17	68	Qualification for DFB-Pokal
5	Hansa Rostock	38	18	13	7	74	49	+25	67	

Source: DFB
Rules for classification: 1) Points; 2) Goal difference; 3) Goals scored; 4) Head-to-head results; 5) Head-to-head away goals scored; 6) Away goals scored; 7) Play-off.
(C) Champions; (P) Promoted

==== Results summary ====
Overall								Home						Away					
Pld	W	D	L	GF	GA	GD	Pts	W	D	L	GF	GA	GD	W	D	L	GF	GA	GD
38	24	8	6	66	34	+32	80	11	5	3	29	12	+17	13	3	3	37	22	+15

Last updated: 16 May 2026.
Source: worldfootball

===== Results by round =====
Round	1	2	3	4	5	6	7	8	9	10	11	12	13	14	15	16	17	18	19	20
Ground	H	A	H	A	H	A	H	A	H	A	H	A	H	A	H	A	H	A	H	A
Result	D	L	W	W	D	D	W	D	W	W	L	W	D	W	W	L	L	W	L	W
Position	17	18	9	7	8	10	5	5	4	3	4	4	4	3	3	5	5	4	6	5

Updated to match(es) played on 117 January 2026. Source: worldfootball
A = Away; H = Home; W = Win; D = Draw; L = Loss

==== Matches ====
2 August 2025 1	VfL Osnabrück	0 - 0	Alemannia Aachen	Osnabrück
14:00 CEST	Yiğit Karademir (yellow card) 13'; Kehl (yellow card) 83'; Henning (yellow card) 90+3'	Report	Strujić (yellow card) 18'	Stadium: Stadion an der Bremer Brücke; Attendance: 15,741; Referee: (Germany) Fabienne Michel

9 August 2025 2	1860 Munich	3 - 1	VfL Osnabrück	Munich
14:00 CEST	Jacobsen (yellow card) 2'; Volland 10' (yellow card) 26'; Niederlechner 41'; Haugen 52'; Verlaat (yellow card) 59'; Voet (yellow card) 69'	Report	Yiğit Karademir (yellow card) 10'; Kammerbauer 75'; Müller (yellow card) 90+6'	Stadium: Grünwalder Stadion; Attendance: 15,000; Referee: (Germany) Timo Gerach

23 August 2025 3	VfL Osnabrück	2 - 0	1. FC Saarbrücken	Osnabrück
14:00 CEST	Kammerbauer (yellow card) 5'; Henning (yellow card) 44'; Jacobsen 78'; Christensen 84'	Report	Krahn (yellow card) 42'; Bretschneider (yellow card) 49'	Stadium: Stadion an der Bremer Brücke; Attendance: 14,108; Referee: (Germany) Marc Philip Eckermann

30 August 2025 4	TSV Havelse	0 - 2	VfL Osnabrück	Hanover
14:00 CEST	Plume (yellow card) 48'; Besfort Kolgeci (yellow card) 49'; Jannik Oltrogge (yellow card) 51'	Report	Kehl (yellow card) 9'; Meißner 32'; Schumacher (yellow card) 48'; Jacobsen 61'; Jonsson (yellow card) 88'	Stadium: Eilenriedestadion; Attendance: 2,812; Referee: (Germany) Davina Lutz

14 September 2025 5	VfL Osnabrück	0 - 0	Hansa Rostock	Osnabrück
13:30 CEST	Wagner (yellow card) 5'; Niklas Wiemann (yellow card) 14'; Lesueur (yellow card) 77'; Schultz (yellow card) 81'; Müller (yellow card) 85'	Report	Benno Dietze (yellow card) 10'; Pfanne (yellow card) 27'; Fatkič (yellow card) 51'; Bergh (yellow card) 57'; Gürleyen (yellow card) 61'	Stadium: Stadion an der Bremer Brücke; Attendance: 15,741; Referee: (Germany) Nico Fuchs

17 September 2025 6	Rot-Weiss Essen	1 - 1	VfL Osnabrück	Essen
19:00 CEST	Tom Moustier 68'	Report	Pröger (yellow card) 51'; Müller (yellow card) 55'; Kehl 66' (pen.)	Stadium: Stadion an der Hafenstraße; Attendance: 18,047; Referee: (Germany) Assad Nouhoum

20 September 2025 7	VfL Osnabrück	3 - 1	Erzgebirge Aue	Osnabrück
14:00 CEST	Jacobsen 49'; Kehl 63' (pen.); Ismail Badjie 90+5'	Report	Mika Clausen 70'; Malone (red card) 90'; Erik Weinhauer (yellow card) 90+2'	Stadium: Stadion an der Bremer Brücke; Attendance: 14,072; Referee: (Germany) Yannick Sager

28 September 2025 8	Viktoria Köln	0 - 0	VfL Osnabrück	Köln
19:30 CEST	Meiko Sponsel (yellow card) 79'	Report	Ismail Badjie (yellow card) 38'; Christensen (yellow card) 46'	Stadium: Sportpark Höhenberg; Attendance: 3,674; Referee: (Germany) Martin Wilke

1 October 2025 9	VfL Osnabrück	2 - 0	Jahn Regensburg	Osnabrück
19:00 CEST	Yiğit Karademir (yellow card) 16'; Wagner 27'; Kammerbauer 64'; Bernd Riesselmann (yellow card) 90'; Müller (yellow card) 90++5'	Report	Hottmann (yellow card) 35'; Davis Asante (yellow card) 52'; Strauß (yellow card) 65'; Galjen (yellow card) 90+2'	Stadium: Stadion an der Bremer Brücke; Attendance: 14,063; Referee: (Germany) Cristian Ballweg

4 October 2025 10	Waldhof Mannheim	1 - 4	VfL Osnabrück	Mannheim
14:00 CEST	Lohkemper 14'; Shipnoski (yellow card) 53'; Boyd (yellow card) 72'	Report	Wagner (yellow card) 26'; Meißner 49' 58'; Christensen (yellow card) 59' (goal) 64'; Ismail Badjie 87'	Stadium: Carl-Benz-Stadion; Attendance: 9,413; Referee: (Germany) Max Burda

18 October 2025 11	VfL Osnabrück	0 - 4	TSG 1899 Hoffenheim II	Osnabrück
14:00 CEST	Henning (yellow card) 57'; Jacobsen (yellow card) 58'; Schultz (yellow card) 69'; Ihorst (yellow card) 83'; Kammerbauer (yellow card) 84'	Report	Ayoube Amaimouni-Echghouyab 5'; Yannis Hör (yellow card) 44'; David Mokwa (yellow card) 56'; Zeitler 76' (yellow card) 84'; Ben Opoku Labes 81'; Paul Hennrich 85'	Stadium: Stadion an der Bremer Brücke; Attendance: 15,741; Referee: (Germany) Justin Hasmann

25 October 2025 12	1. FC Schweinfurt 05	1 - 2	VfL Osnabrück	Schweinfurt
16:30 CEST	Lucas Zeller (yellow card) 34'; Nick Doktorczyk (yellow card) 43'; Nico Grimbs 87'	Report	Kevin Wiethaup (yellow card) 39'; Kopacz 40'; Meißner 77'; Ismail Badjie (yellow card) 89'	Stadium: Riedel Bau Arena im Sachs-Stadion; Attendance: 3,656; Referee: (Germany) Jonah Besong

1 November 2025 13	VfL Osnabrück	0 - 0	MSV Duisburg	Osnabrück
14:00 CET	Kammerbauer (yellow card) 12'; Jacobsen (yellow card) 72'; Lesueur (yellow card) 90+4'	[www.worldfootball.net/match-report/co4/germany-3-liga/ma11235779/vfl-osnabrueck_msv-duisburg/ Report]	Tugbenyo (yellow card) 32'; Viet (yellow card) 40'; Hahn (yellow card) 51'; Bitter (yellow card) 88'	Stadium: Stadion an der Bremer Brücke; Attendance: 15,749; Referee: (Germany) Timo Gansloweit

8 November 2025 14	Energie Cottbus	0 - 1	VfL Osnabrück	Cottbus
14:00 CET	King Manu (yellow card) 30'; Lucoqui (yellow card) 70'	[www.worldfootball.net/match-report/co4/germany-3-liga/ma11236205/energie-cottbus_vfl-osnabrueck/ Report]	Ismail Badjie 73'; Lesueur (yellow card) 89'	Stadium: LEAG Energie Stadion; Attendance: 11,072; Referee: (Germany) Florian Lechner

22 November 2025 15	VfL Osnabrück	1 - 0	FC Ingolstadt 04	Osnabrück
16:30 CET	Kehl (yellow card) 12'; Kopacz (yellow card) 44'; Wagner (yellow card) 79'; Ismail Badjie 89' (yellow card) 90'	Report	Christensen (yellow card) 80'	Stadium: Stadion an der Bremer Brücke; Attendance: 14,386; Referee: (Germany) Felix Grund

30 November 2025 16	SC Verl	4 - 1	VfL Osnabrück	Verl
16:30 CET	Besio 15'; Mhamdi 18'; Arweiler 63' 66'	Report	Müller (yellow card) 40'; Kopacz 56'; Kevin Wiethaup (yellow card) 80'; Christensen (yellow card) 90+6'	Stadium: Sportclub Arena; Attendance: 5,153; Referee: (Germany) Patrick Schwengers

6 December 2025 17	VfL Osnabrück	0 - 1	Wehen Wiesbaden	Osnabrück
14:00 CET	Wagner (yellow card) 21'; Jacobsen (yellow card) 52'; Bernd Riesselmann (yellow card) 90+1'; Niklas Wiemann (yellow card) 90+5'	Report	Justin Janitzek (yellow card) 15'; Kaya 33'	Stadium: Stadion an der Bremer Brücke; Attendance: 14,212; Referee: (Germany) Luca Jürgensen

12 December 2025 18	SSV Ulm	3 - 5	VfL Osnabrück	Ulm
19:00 CET	Lukas Mazagg (yellow card) 33'; Chessa 34'; Dressel (yellow card) 37'; Dajaku (yellow card) 39'; Besong 48'; Kölle (yellow card) 52'; Max Brandt (yellow card) 60'; Ensar Aksakal (yellow card) 83'; Löder 87'	Report	Lesueur 2'; Niklas Wiemann 16'; Robin Fabinski (yellow card) 47'; Kehl 56' 58'; Meißner 74'	Stadium: Donaustadion; Attendance: 8,913; Referee: (Germany) Ben Uhrig

20 December 2025 19	VfL Osnabrück	1 - 2	VfB Stuttgart II	Osnabrück
14:00 CET	Kopacz 35'; Müller (yellow card) 38'; Kehl (yellow card) 51'; Wagner (yellow card) 62'	Report	Ouro-Tagba (yellow card) 38' (goal) 57'; Lauri Penna (yellow card) 81'; Sankoh 82'; Florian Hellstern (yellow card) 90+5'	Stadium: Stadion an der Bremer Brücke; Attendance: 15,741; Referee: (Germany) Niclas Rose

17 January 2026 20	Alemannia Aachen	0 - 3	VfL Osnabrück	Aachen
16:30 CET	Wiebe (yellow card) 12'	Report	Henning 7'; Kammerbauer (yellow card) 23'; Scepanik 41' (o.g.); Meißner 89'	Stadium: New Tivoli; Attendance: 24,113; Referee: (Germany) Timo Gansloweit
