= 2020–21 VfL Osnabrück season =

VfL Osnabrück
2020–21 season
- Chairman: Manfred Hülsmann
- Head coach: Marco Grote (until 15 February 2021); Florian Fulland (15 February 2021 – 3 March 2021); Markus Feldhoff (from 3 March 2021)
- Stadium: Stadion an der Bremer Brücke
- 2. Bundesliga: 16th (relegated via play-offs)
- DFB-Pokal: Second round

The 2020–21 season is VfL Osnabrück's 122nd season in existence and the club's 2nd consecutive season in the second flight of German football. In addition to the domestic league, VfL Osnabrück will participate in this season's edition of the DFB-Pokal. The season covers the period from 1 July 2020 to 30 June 2021.

== Friendly matches ==
Win	Draw	Loss

Date	Time (Note: Time shown in local time)	Opponent	Venue	Result (Note: VfL Osnabrück's score shown first)	Scorers	Attendance	Ref.
9 August 2020	19:00	Schalke 04	Home (Note: Match played at Quitt-Stadion, Ankum)	1–5	Henning 55'	0 (Note: Match played behind closed doors)	
15 August 2020	15:30	Arminia Bielefeld	Away	1–1	Amenyido 40'	0	

== Competitions ==
=== 2. Bundesliga ===
==== League table ====
Pos	Team	Pld	W	D	L	GF	GA	GD	Pts	Qualification or relegation
14	Jahn Regensburg	34	9	11	14	37	50	−13	38	
15	SV Sandhausen	34	10	4	20	41	60	−19	34	
16	VfL Osnabrück (R)	34	9	6	19	35	58	−23	33	Qualification for relegation play-offs
17	Eintracht Braunschweig (R)	34	7	10	17	30	59	−29	31	Relegation to 3. Liga
18	Würzburger Kickers (R)	34	6	7	21	37	69	−32	25	Relegation to 3. Liga

Source: DFB
Rules for classification: 1) Points; 2) Goal difference; 3) Goals scored; 4) Head-to-head points; 5) Head-to-head goal difference; 6) Head-to-head away goals scored; 7) Away goals scored; 8) Play-off.
(R) Relegated

==== Matches ====
Win	Draw	Loss

Match	Date	Time	Opponent	Venue	Result	Scorers	Attendance	Referee	Ref.
1	20 September 2020	13:30	Greuther Fürth	Away	1–1	Santos 26'	3,000	Kampka	
2	25 September 2020	18:30	Hannover 96	Home	2–1	Santos 33' (pen.), 47'	3,200	Aarnink	
3	2 October 2020	18:30	VfL Bochum	Away	0–0	—	4,231	Sather	
5	25 October 2020	13:30	1. FC Heidenheim	Away	1–1	Amenyido 61'	0	Dingert	
4	28 October 2020 (Note: Match originally due to be played on 18 October 2020 at 13:30, but postponed and rescheduled due to cases of COVID-19 within Osnabrück's squad.)	18:30	Darmstadt 98	Home	1–1	Ihorst 78'	0	Schmidt	
6	31 October 2020	13:00	SV Sandhausen	Home	2–1	Beermann 42', Ajdini 45'	0	Siewer	
7	8 November 2020	13:30	Jahn Regensburg	Away	4–2	Kerk 22' (pen.), 41', 72' (pen.), Amenyido 64'	0	Gerach	
8	23 November 2020	20:30	1. FC Nürnberg	Home	1–4	Kerk 90+1' (pen.)	0	Zwayer	
9	27 November 2020	20:30	FC St. Pauli	Away	1–0	Blacha 86'	0	Jöllenbeck	
10	5 December 2020	13:00	Karlsruher SC	Home	1–2	Beermann 28'	0	Ittrich	
11	13 December 2020	13:30	Eintracht Braunschweig	Away	2–0	Kerk 3', Multhaup 65'	0	Thomsen	
12	16 December 2020	18:30	Fortuna Düsseldorf	Away	0–3	—	0	Lechner	
13	19 December 2020	13:00	SC Paderborn 07	Home	0–1	—	0	Petersen	
14	3 January 2021	13:30	Holstein Kiel	Away	2–1	Schmidt 27', Kerk 40'	0	Osmers	
15	9 January 2021	13:00	Würzburger Kickers	Home	2–3	Kerk 41', Ihorst 85'	0	Siewer	
16	18 January 2021	20:30	Hamburger SV	Away	0–5	—	0	Schlager	
17	22 January 2021	18:30	Erzgebirge Aue	Home	0–1	—	0	Sather	
18	26 January 2021	20:30	Greuther Fürth	Home	0–1	—	0	Thomsen	
19	1 February 2021	20:30	Hannover 96	Away	0–1	—	0	Gräfe	
20	6 February 2021	13:00	VfL Bochum	Home	1–2	Kerk 64'	0	Waschitzki	
21	14 February 2021	13:30	Darmstadt 98	Away	0–1	—	0	Ittrich	
22	20 February 2021	13:00	1. FC Heidenheim	Home	1–2	Santos 88'	0	Kampka	
23	28 February 2021	13:30	SV Sandhausen	Away	0–3	—	0	Storks	
25	14 March 2021	13:30	1. FC Nürnberg	Away	1–1	Heider 73'	0	Waschitzki	
26	21 March 2021	13:30	FC St. Pauli	Home	1–2	Heider 79'	0	Thomsen	
27	3 April 2021	13:00	Karlsruher SC	Away	1–0	Santos 49'	0	Lechner	
28	11 April 2021	13:30	Eintracht Braunschweig	Home	0–4	—	0	Stegemann	
24	14 April 2021 (Note: Match originally due to be played on 7 March 2021, but postponed and rescheduled due to cases of COVID-19 within Regensburg squad.)	18:30	Jahn Regensburg	Home	0–1	—	0	Bacher	
29	18 April 2021	13:30	Fortuna Düsseldorf	Home	0–3	—	0	Jablonski	
30	21 April 2021	18:30	SC Paderborn 07	Away	2–2	Santos 14', Heider 84'	0	Jöllenbeck	
31	24 April 2021	13:00	Holstein Kiel	Home	1–3	Kerk 53'	0	Cortus	
32	8 May 2021	13:00	Würzburger Kickers	Away	3–1	Santos 51', Taffertshoffer 79', Reis 85'	0	Waschitzki	
33	16 May 2021	15:30	Hamburger SV	Home	3–2	Santos 34', Multhaup 61', Heider 84'	0	Siebert	
34	23 May 2021	15:30	Erzgebirge Aue	Away	1–2	Kerk 25'	0	Petersen	

==== Play-offs ====
Win	Draw	Loss

Date	Time	Opponent	Venue	Result	Scorers	Attendance	Referee	Ref.
27 May 2021	18:15	FC Ingolstadt	Away	0–3	—	250	Stegemann	
30 May 2021	13:30	FC Ingolstadt	Home	3–1	Heider 6', 20', Amenyido 81'	2,000	Stieler	

=== DFB-Pokal ===
Win	Draw	Loss

Round	Date	Time	Opponent	Venue	Result	Scorers	Attendance	Referee	Ref.
First round	12 September 2020	15:30	SV Todesfelde	Away	1–0	Klaas 77'	500	Ittrich	
Second round	22 December 2020	18:30	1. FC Köln	Away	0–1	—	0	Hartmann	
