= 2020–21 2. Bundesliga =

47th season of the second-tier football league in Germany

2. Bundesliga
- Season: 2020–21
- Dates: 18 September 2020 – 23 May 2021
- Champions: VfL Bochum
- Promoted: VfL Bochum; Greuther Fürth
- Relegated: VfL Osnabrück (via play-off); Eintracht Braunschweig; Würzburger Kickers
- Matches: 306
- Goals: 908 (2.97 per match)
- Top goalscorer: Serdar Dursun (27 goals)
- Biggest home win: Bochum 5–0 Düsseldorf; Hamburg 5–0 Osnabrück
- Biggest away win: Aue 3–8 Paderborn
- Highest scoring: Aue 3–8 Paderborn
- Longest winning run: 5 games Düsseldorf; Fürth; Hamburg; Kiel; St. Pauli
- Longest unbeaten run: 11 games Hamburg
- Longest winless run: 13 games St. Pauli
- Longest losing run: 9 games Osnabrück
- Attendance: 103,582 (339 per match) (Note: Due to the COVID-19 pandemic in Germany, each local health department allows a different number of spectators.)

The 2020–21 2. Bundesliga was the 47th season of the 2. Bundesliga. It began on 18 September 2020 and concluded on 23 May 2021. The season was originally scheduled to begin on 31 July 2020 and conclude on 16 May 2021, though this was delayed due to postponement of the previous season as a result of the COVID-19 pandemic. The relegation games were scheduled to be held between 26 and 30 May 2021. From 22 December 2020 to 1 January 2021, the season was interrupted by a shortened winter break. A total of 306 league and four relegation games were to be played, including three English weeks.

The fixtures were announced on 7 August 2020.

== Effects of the COVID-19 pandemic ==
The season was originally scheduled to open on 31 July 2020 and end on 16 May 2021. As the pre-season operation was suspended for several weeks between 11 March and 16 May 2020 due to the COVID-19 pandemic, and the international club competitions of the same season did not end until August 2020, a postponement of the start of the season became necessary. The DFB and the DFL, in consultation with FIFA, also adapted the summer transfer period (in principle 1 July to 31 August). The transfer window was open on 1 July (change period I.1) and from 15 July to 5 October 2020 (change period I.2). The first one-day phase was planned, in particular for the registration of contracts already concluded, starting on 1 July.

On 3 September 2020, the DFL General Assembly voted to extend the use of five substitutions in matches to the 2020–21 season, which was implemented at the end of the previous season to lessen the impact of fixture congestion caused by the COVID-19 pandemic. The use of five substitutes, based on the decision of competition organisers, had been extended by IFAB until 2021.

On 15 September 2020, three days before the opening of the new season, the premiers and representatives of the league agreed on a concept that would allow a spectator count of 20 percent of the stadium capacity by the end of October. In the end, 13 of 54 matches had to be played in the first six days of the season, but on average only 1,900 spectators were allowed into the stadiums until then. Following a decision by the Prime Ministers on 29 October, a general exclusion of spectators was finally ordered at least for match days 7 to 9. The background was the shutdown, which was initially only valid for November nationwide, but did not include the general operation of the two Bundesligen.

== Teams ==
Locations of the 2020–21 2. Bundesliga teams

=== Team changes ===
| Promoted from 2019–20 3. Liga | Relegated from 2019–20 Bundesliga | Promoted to 2020–21 Bundesliga | Relegated to 2020–21 3. Liga |
|---|---|---|---|
| Würzburger Kickers; Eintracht Braunschweig | Fortuna Düsseldorf; SC Paderborn | Arminia Bielefeld; VfB Stuttgart | Wehen Wiesbaden; Dynamo Dresden |

=== Stadiums and locations ===
Due to the COVID-19 pandemic, only partial utilisation of the respective total capacities is permitted indefinitely, there are regional differences resulting from decisions of the respective state governments. In addition, since the 7th day of play, only ghost games may be played with the exclusion of the public.

| Team | Location | Stadium | Capacity |
|---|---|---|---|
| Erzgebirge Aue | Aue-Bad Schlema | Erzgebirgsstadion | 15,711 |
| VfL Bochum | Bochum | Vonovia Ruhrstadion | 29,299 |
| Eintracht Braunschweig | Braunschweig | Eintracht-Stadion | 23,325 |
| Darmstadt 98 | Darmstadt | Merck-Stadion am Böllenfalltor | 17,000 |
| Fortuna Düsseldorf | Düsseldorf | Merkur Spiel-Arena | 54,600 |
| Greuther Fürth | Fürth | Sportpark Ronhof Thomas Sommer | 18,500 |
| Hamburger SV | Hamburg | Volksparkstadion | 57,000 |
| Hannover 96 | Hanover | HDI-Arena | 49,000 |
| 1. FC Heidenheim | Heidenheim | Voith-Arena | 15,000 |
| Karlsruher SC | Karlsruhe | Wildparkstadion | 29,699 |
| Holstein Kiel | Kiel | Holstein-Stadion | 15,034 |
| 1. FC Nürnberg | Nuremberg | Max-Morlock-Stadion | 49,923 |
| VfL Osnabrück | Osnabrück | Stadion an der Bremer Brücke | 16,667 |
| SC Paderborn | Paderborn | Benteler-Arena | 15,000 |
| Jahn Regensburg | Regensburg | Jahnstadion Regensburg | 15,210 |
| SV Sandhausen | Sandhausen | BWT-Stadion am Hardtwald | 15,414 |
| FC St. Pauli | Hamburg | Millerntor-Stadion | 29,546 |
| Würzburger Kickers | Würzburg | Flyeralarm Arena | 14,500 |

=== Personnel and kits ===
| Team | Manager | Captain | Kit manufacturer | Shirt sponsor | |
| Team | Manager | Captain | Kit manufacturer | Front | Sleeve |
|---|---|---|---|---|---|
| Erzgebirge Aue | (Germany) Dirk Schuster | (Germany) Martin Männel | Nike | WätaS Wärmetauscher Sachsen | Leonhardt Group |
| VfL Bochum | (Germany) Thomas Reis | (France) Anthony Losilla | Nike | Tricorp Workwear | Viactiv Betriebskrankenkasse |
| Eintracht Braunschweig | (Germany) Daniel Meyer | (Poland) Martin Kobylański | Erima | Heycar | MT Massivhaus |
| Darmstadt 98 | (Germany) Markus Anfang | (Germany) Fabian Holland | Craft | Software AG | Dialog Minds |
| Fortuna Düsseldorf | (Germany) Uwe Rösler | (Poland) Adam Bodzek | Uhlsport | Henkel | Toyo Tires |
| Greuther Fürth | (Germany) Stefan Leitl | (Sweden) Branimir Hrgota | Puma | Hofmann Personal | BVUK |
| Hamburger SV | (Germany) Horst Hrubesch | (Germany) Tim Leibold | Adidas | Orthomol | Popp Feinkost |
| Hannover 96 | (Turkey) Kenan Kocak | (Germany) Dominik Kaiser | Macron | Heinz von Heiden | HDI |
| 1. FC Heidenheim | (Germany) Frank Schmidt | (Germany) Marc Schnatterer | Nike | Kneipp | Voith |
| Karlsruher SC | (Germany) Christian Eichner | (Germany) Jérôme Gondorf | Macron | Klaiber Markisen | CG Gruppe |
| Holstein Kiel | (Germany) Ole Werner | (Germany) Hauke Wahl | Puma | Famila | Lotto Schleswig-Holstein |
| 1. FC Nürnberg | (Germany) Robert Klauß | (Germany) Enrico Valentini | Umbro | Nürnberger Versicherung | Godelmann Betonstein |
| VfL Osnabrück | (Germany) Markus Feldhoff | (Germany) Maurice Trapp | Puma | sunmaker | Sievert |
| SC Paderborn | (Germany) Steffen Baumgart | (Germany) Sebastian Schonlau | Saller | sunmaker | Effect Energy Drink |
| Jahn Regensburg | (Bosnia and Herzegovina) Mersad Selimbegović | (Germany) Benedikt Gimber | Saller | Netto | Dallmeier electronic |
| SV Sandhausen | (Austria) Stefan Kulovits | (Germany) Dennis Diekmeier | Puma | gymper | BWT |
| FC St. Pauli | (Germany) Timo Schultz | (Germany) Christopher Avevor | Under Armour | Congstar | Astra Brauerei |
| Würzburger Kickers | (Germany) Ralf Santelli / (Germany) Sebastian Schuppan | (Germany) Daniel Hägele | Jako | BVUK | Flyeralarm |

=== Managerial changes ===
| Team | Outgoing | Manner | Exit date | | Position in table | Incoming | Incoming date | | Ref. |
| Team | Outgoing | Manner | Announced on | Departed on | Position in table | Incoming | Announced on | Arrived on | Ref. |
|---|---|---|---|---|---|---|---|---|---|
| Darmstadt 98 | (Greece) Dimitrios Grammozis | End of contract | 26 February 2020 | 30 June 2020 | Pre-season | (Germany) Markus Anfang | 16 April 2020 | 1 July 2020 | |
| FC St. Pauli | (Netherlands) Jos Luhukay | Mutual consent | 29 June 2020 | 30 June 2020 | Pre-season | (Germany) Timo Schultz | 12 July 2020 | | |
| Hamburger SV | (Germany) Dieter Hecking | End of contract | 4 July 2020 | 30 June 2020 | Pre-season | (Germany) Daniel Thioune | 6 July 2020 | | |
| VfL Osnabrück | (Germany) Daniel Thioune | Signed for Hamburger SV | 6 July 2020 | | Pre-season | (Germany) Marco Grote | 22 July 2020 | | |
| Eintracht Braunschweig | (Germany) Marco Antwerpen | End of contract | 7 July 2020 | | Pre-season | (Germany) Daniel Meyer | 10 July 2020 | | |
| 1. FC Nürnberg | (Germany) Michael Wiesinger | End of contract | 11 July 2020 | | Pre-season | (Germany) Robert Klauß | 30 July 2020 | | |
| Würzburger Kickers | (Germany) Michael Schiele | Sacked | 29 September 2020 | | 18th | (Germany) Marco Antwerpen | 29 September 2020 | | |
| Würzburger Kickers | (Germany) Marco Antwerpen | Sacked | 9 November 2020 | | 18th | (Germany) Bernhard Trares | 9 November 2020 | | |
| SV Sandhausen | (Germany) Uwe Koschinat | Sacked | 24 November 2020 | | 15th | (Germany) Michael Schiele | 26 November 2020 | | |
| VfL Osnabrück | (Germany) Marco Grote | Sacked | 15 February 2021 | | 15th | (Germany) Florian Fulland (interim) | 15 February 2021 | | |
| SV Sandhausen | (Germany) Michael Schiele | Sacked | 15 February 2021 | | 16th | (Austria) Stefan Kulovits / (Germany) Gerhard Kleppinger (interim) | 15 February 2021 | | |
| VfL Osnabrück | (Germany) Florian Fulland (interim) | End of caretaker spell | 3 March 2021 | | 15th | (Germany) Markus Feldhoff | 3 March 2021 | | |
| Würzburger Kickers | (Germany) Bernhard Trares | Sacked | 2 April 2021 | | 18th | (Germany) Ralf Santelli / (Germany) Sebastian Schuppan (interim) | 2 April 2021 | | |
| Hamburger SV | (Germany) Daniel Thioune | Sacked | 3 May 2021 | | 3rd | (Germany) Horst Hrubesch (interim) | 3 May 2021 | | |

== League table ==
| Pos | Team | Pld | W | D | L | GF | GA | GD | Pts | Qualification or relegation |
|---|---|---|---|---|---|---|---|---|---|---|
| 1 | VfL Bochum (C, P) | 34 | 21 | 4 | 9 | 66 | 39 | +27 | 67 | Promotion to Bundesliga |
| 2 | Greuther Fürth (P) | 34 | 18 | 10 | 6 | 69 | 44 | +25 | 64 | Promotion to Bundesliga |
| 3 | Holstein Kiel | 34 | 18 | 8 | 8 | 57 | 35 | +22 | 62 | Qualification for promotion play-offs |
| 4 | Hamburger SV | 34 | 16 | 10 | 8 | 71 | 44 | +27 | 58 | |
| 5 | Fortuna Düsseldorf | 34 | 16 | 8 | 10 | 55 | 46 | +9 | 56 | |
| 6 | Karlsruher SC | 34 | 14 | 10 | 10 | 51 | 44 | +7 | 52 | |
| 7 | Darmstadt 98 | 34 | 15 | 6 | 13 | 63 | 55 | +8 | 51 | |
| 8 | 1. FC Heidenheim | 34 | 15 | 6 | 13 | 49 | 49 | 0 | 51 | |
| 9 | SC Paderborn | 34 | 12 | 11 | 11 | 53 | 45 | +8 | 47 | |
| 10 | FC St. Pauli | 34 | 13 | 8 | 13 | 51 | 56 | −5 | 47 | |
| 11 | 1. FC Nürnberg | 34 | 11 | 11 | 12 | 46 | 51 | −5 | 44 | |
| 12 | Erzgebirge Aue | 34 | 12 | 8 | 14 | 44 | 53 | −9 | 44 | |
| 13 | Hannover 96 | 34 | 12 | 6 | 16 | 53 | 51 | +2 | 42 | |
| 14 | Jahn Regensburg | 34 | 9 | 11 | 14 | 37 | 50 | −13 | 38 | |
| 15 | SV Sandhausen | 34 | 10 | 4 | 20 | 41 | 60 | −19 | 34 | |
| 16 | VfL Osnabrück (R) | 34 | 9 | 6 | 19 | 35 | 58 | −23 | 33 | Qualification for relegation play-offs |
| 17 | Eintracht Braunschweig (R) | 34 | 7 | 10 | 17 | 30 | 59 | −29 | 31 | Relegation to 3. Liga |
| 18 | Würzburger Kickers (R) | 34 | 6 | 7 | 21 | 37 | 69 | −32 | 25 | Relegation to 3. Liga |

Source: DFB
Rules for classification: 1) Points; 2) Goal difference; 3) Goals scored; 4) Head-to-head points; 5) Head-to-head goal difference; 6) Head-to-head away goals scored; 7) Away goals scored; 8) Play-off.
(C) Champions; (P) Promoted; (R) Relegated

== Results ==
| Home \ Away | AUE | BOC | BRA | DAR | DÜS | FÜR | HAM | HAN | HEI | KAR | KIE | NÜR | OSN | PAD | REG | SAN | STP | WÜR |
|---|---|---|---|---|---|---|---|---|---|---|---|---|---|---|---|---|---|---|
| Erzgebirge Aue | — | 1–0 | 3–1 | 3–0 | 0–3 | 1–1 | 3–3 | 1–1 | 2–1 | 4–1 | 1–1 | 0–1 | 2–1 | 3–8 | 0–2 | 2–0 | 1–3 | 2–1 |
| VfL Bochum | 2–0 | — | 2–0 | 2–1 | 5–0 | 0–2 | 0–2 | 4–3 | 3–0 | 1–2 | 2–1 | 3–1 | 0–0 | 3–0 | 5–1 | 3–1 | 2–2 | 3–0 |
| Eintracht Braunschweig | 0–2 | 2–1 | — | 1–1 | 0–0 | 0–3 | 2–4 | 1–2 | 1–0 | 1–3 | 0–0 | 3–2 | 0–2 | 0–0 | 2–0 | 1–0 | 2–1 | 1–2 |
| Darmstadt 98 | 4–1 | 3–1 | 4–0 | — | 1–2 | 2–2 | 1–2 | 1–2 | 5–1 | 0–1 | 0–2 | 1–2 | 1–0 | 0–4 | 0–0 | 2–1 | 2–2 | 2–0 |
| Fortuna Düsseldorf | 3–0 | 0–3 | 2–2 | 3–2 | — | 3–3 | 0–0 | 3–2 | 1–0 | 3–2 | 0–2 | 3–1 | 3–0 | 2–1 | 2–2 | 1–0 | 2–0 | 1–0 |
| Greuther Fürth | 3–0 | 1–2 | 3–0 | 0–4 | 3–2 | — | 0–1 | 4–1 | 0–1 | 2–2 | 2–1 | 2–2 | 1–1 | 1–1 | 4–1 | 3–2 | 2–1 | 4–1 |
| Hamburger SV | 3–0 | 1–3 | 4–0 | 1–2 | 2–1 | 0–0 | — | 0–1 | 2–0 | 1–1 | 1–1 | 5–2 | 5–0 | 3–1 | 3–1 | 4–0 | 2–2 | 3–1 |
| Hannover 96 | 0–0 | 2–0 | 4–1 | 1–2 | 3–0 | 2–2 | 3–3 | — | 1–3 | 2–0 | 0–3 | 1–2 | 1–0 | 0–0 | 3–1 | 4–0 | 2–3 | 1–2 |
| 1. FC Heidenheim | 2–0 | 0–2 | 2–0 | 3–0 | 3–2 | 0–1 | 3–2 | 1–0 | — | 1–2 | 1–0 | 2–0 | 1–1 | 0–0 | 0–0 | 2–1 | 3–4 | 4–1 |
| Karlsruher SC | 0–0 | 0–1 | 0–0 | 3–4 | 1–2 | 3–2 | 1–2 | 1–0 | 1–1 | — | 3–2 | 0–1 | 0–1 | 1–0 | 0–0 | 3–0 | 0–0 | 2–2 |
| Holstein Kiel | 1–0 | 3–1 | 3–1 | 2–3 | 2–1 | 1–3 | 1–1 | 1–0 | 2–2 | 2–3 | — | 1–0 | 1–2 | 1–0 | 3–2 | 2–0 | 4–0 | 1–0 |
| 1. FC Nürnberg | 1–0 | 1–1 | 0–0 | 2–3 | 1–1 | 2–3 | 1–1 | 2–5 | 3–1 | 1–1 | 1–1 | — | 1–1 | 2–1 | 0–1 | 1–0 | 1–2 | 2–1 |
| VfL Osnabrück | 0–1 | 1–2 | 0–4 | 1–1 | 0–3 | 0–1 | 3–2 | 2–1 | 1–2 | 1–2 | 1–3 | 1–4 | — | 0–1 | 0–1 | 2–1 | 1–2 | 2–3 |
| SC Paderborn | 2–1 | 3–0 | 2–2 | 2–3 | 2–1 | 2–4 | 3–4 | 1–0 | 2–2 | 2–2 | 1–1 | 0–2 | 2–2 | — | 3–1 | 2–1 | 2–0 | 1–0 |
| Jahn Regensburg | 1–1 | 0–2 | 3–0 | 1–1 | 1–1 | 1–2 | 1–1 | 0–0 | 0–3 | 1–0 | 2–3 | 1–1 | 2–4 | 1–0 | — | 3–1 | 3–0 | 2–1 |
| SV Sandhausen | 1–4 | 1–1 | 2–2 | 3–2 | 0–0 | 0–3 | 2–1 | 4–2 | 4–0 | 2–3 | 0–2 | 2–0 | 3–0 | 1–1 | 2–0 | — | 1–0 | 1–0 |
| FC St. Pauli | 2–2 | 2–3 | 2–0 | 3–2 | 0–3 | 2–1 | 1–0 | 1–2 | 4–2 | 0–3 | 1–1 | 2–2 | 0–1 | 0–2 | 2–0 | 2–1 | — | 4–0 |
| Würzburger Kickers | 0–3 | 2–3 | 0–0 | 1–3 | 2–1 | 2–2 | 3–2 | 2–1 | 1–2 | 2–4 | 0–2 | 1–1 | 1–2 | 1–1 | 1–1 | 2–3 | 1–1 | — |

Source: DFB
Legend: Blue = home team win; Yellow = draw; Red = away team win.

== Promotion/relegation play-offs ==
The relegation play-offs took place on 27 and 30 May 2021.

All times are CEST (UTC+2).

=== Overview ===
| Team 1 | Agg. | Team 2 | 1st leg | 2nd leg |
|---|---|---|---|---|
| FC Ingolstadt | 4–3 | VfL Osnabrück | 3–0 | 1–3 |

=== Matches ===
27 May 2021
18:15

| FC Ingolstadt | 3–0 | VfL Osnabrück |
|---|---|---|
| Schröck 2'; Kaya 35'; Eckert 81' | Report |

Audi Sportpark, Ingolstadt
Attendance: 250
Referee: Sascha Stegemann
30 May 2021
13:30

| VfL Osnabrück | 3–1 | FC Ingolstadt |
|---|---|---|
| Heider 6', 20'; Amenyido 81' | Report | Bilbija 31' |

Stadion an der Bremer Brücke, Osnabrück
Attendance: 2,000
Referee: Tobias Stieler

FC Ingolstadt won 4–3 on aggregate and are promoted to the 2. Bundesliga, while VfL Osnabrück are relegated to the 3. Liga.

== Statistics ==
=== Top scorers ===
| Rank | Player | Club | Goals |
|---|---|---|---|
| 1 | (Turkey) Serdar Dursun | Darmstadt 98 | 27 |
| 2 | (Germany) Simon Terodde | Hamburger SV | 24 |
| 3 | (Germany) Marvin Ducksch | Hannover 96 | 16 |
| 3 | (Sweden) Branimir Hrgota | Greuther Fürth | 16 |
| 3 | (Germany) Dennis Srbeny | SC Paderborn | 16 |
| 6 | (Germany) Simon Zoller | VfL Bochum | 15 |
| 6 | (Austria) Robert Žulj | VfL Bochum | 15 |
| 8 | (Denmark) Andreas Albers | Jahn Regensburg | 13 |
| 8 | (Germany) Kevin Behrens | SV Sandhausen | 13 |
| 8 | (Germany) Chris Führich | SC Paderborn | 13 |
| 8 | (Germany) Philipp Hofmann | Karlsruher SC | 13 |
| 8 | (Germany) Christian Kühlwetter | 1. FC Heidenheim | 13 |
| 8 | (Germany) Janni Serra | Holstein Kiel | 13 |

=== Clean sheets ===
| Rank | Player | Club | Clean cheets |
|---|---|---|---|
| 1 | (Germany) Florian Kastenmeier | Fortuna Düsseldorf | 11 |
| 1 | (Germany) Alexander Meyer | Jahn Regensburg | 11 |
| 3 | (Germany) Kevin Müller | 1. FC Heidenheim | 10 |
| 3 | (Germany) Manuel Riemann | VfL Bochum | 10 |
| 3 | (Germany) Leopold Zingerle | SC Paderborn | 10 |
| 6 | (Bosnia and Herzegovina) Jasmin Fejzić | Eintracht Braunschweig | 9 |
| 6 | (Greece) Ioannis Gelios | Holstein Kiel | 9 |
| 6 | (Germany) Marius Gersbeck | Karlsruher SC | 9 |
| 6 | (Germany) Sven Ulreich | Hamburger SV | 9 |
| 10 | (Germany) Michael Esser | Hannover 96 | 8 |

== Highs of the season ==
- The highest-scoring match was FC Erzgebirge Aue's 8–3 home loss to SC Paderborn 07 on Matchday 32, when eleven goals were scored. Only in three games in the history of the second division have more than eleven goals been scored.
- The highest victories were by five goals difference each:
  - VfL Bochum's 5–0 win against Fortuna Düsseldorf on Matchday 9;
  - Hamburger SV's 5–0 win against VfL Osnabrück on Matchday 16;
  - SC Paderborn 07's 8–3 win against FC Erzgebirge Aue on Matchday 32.
- The highest-scoring draws were six goals each:
  - Fortuna Düsseldorf's 3–3 draw against SpVgg Greuther Fürth on Matchday 17;
  - FC Erzgebirge Aue's 3–3 draw against Hamburger SV on Matchday 20;
  - Hannover 96's 3–3 draw against Hamburger SV on Matchday 27.
- The highest-scoring matchday was Matchday 32, which was also the highest-scoring matchday in second division history with 46 goals.
- Serdar Dursun (SV Darmstadt 98) scored the most goals in a match in his team's 5–1 win over 1. FC Heidenheim.

== Number of teams by state ==
| Position | State | Number | Teams |
|---|---|---|---|
| 1 | Bavaria | 4 | Greuther Fürth, 1. FC Nürnberg, Jahn Regensburg and Würzburger Kickers |
| 2 | Baden-Württemberg | 3 | 1. FC Heidenheim, Karlsruher SC and SV Sandhausen |
| 2 | North Rhine-Westphalia | 3 | VfL Bochum, Fortuna Düsseldorf and SC Paderborn |
| 2 | Lower Saxony | 3 | Eintracht Braunschweig, Hannover 96 and VfL Osnabrück |
| 5 | Hamburg | 2 | Hamburger SV and FC St. Pauli |
| 6 | Hesse | 1 | Darmstadt 98 |
| 6 | Saxony | 1 | Erzgebirge Aue |
| 6 | Schleswig-Holstein | 1 | Holstein Kiel |
