= 1999–2000 VfL Wolfsburg season =

VfL Wolfsburg
1999–2000 season
- Manager: Wolfgang Wolf
- Stadium: Volkswagen Arena
- Bundesliga: 7th
- DFB-Pokal: Round of 16
- UEFA Cup: Third round
- Top goalscorer: Jonathan Akpoborie (12)

VfL Wolfsburg finished one place lower than the last season, but still qualified for European competition via the Intertoto Cup.

== First team squad ==
Squad at end of season

Note: Flags indicate national team as defined under FIFA eligibility rules; some limited exceptions apply. Players may hold more than one non-FIFA nationality.

No.	Pos.	Nation	Player
1	GK	GER	Claus Reitmaier
2	DF	GER	Frank Greiner
3	MF	GER	Matthias Stammann
4	MF	GER	Nico Däbritz
5	MF	SCO	Brian O'Neil
6	DF	DEN	Claus Thomsen
7	MF	GER	Patrick Weiser
8	DF	GER	Holger Ballwanz
9	FW	POL	Andrzej Juskowiak
10	MF	POL	Krzysztof Nowak
12	DF	POL	Waldemar Kryger
13	DF	CRO	Marino Biliškov
14	MF	ROU	Dorinel Munteanu
15	DF	GER	Peter Kleeschätzky
16	FW	KGZ	Vitus Nagorny

No.	Pos.	Nation	Player
17	FW	GER	Jürgen Rische
18	MF	GER	Detlev Dammeier
19	FW	NGA	Jonathan Akpoborie
20	FW	GER	Markus Feldhoff
21	MF	GER	Christian Wück
22	GK	GER	Holger Hiemann
24	MF	GHA	Charles Akonnor
25	FW	COD	Jean-Kasongo Banza
26	DF	GER	Zoltán Sebescen
27	DF	GER	Nils-Frederick Müller
28	DF	GER	Thomas Hengen
29	MF	GER	Gerald Schröder
30	GK	GER	Guido Koltermann
33	DF	GER	Marcel Maltritz

=== Left club during season ===
Note: Flags indicate national team as defined under FIFA eligibility rules; some limited exceptions apply. Players may hold more than one non-FIFA nationality.

No.	Pos.	Nation	Player
11	FW	GER	Steffen Baumgart (to Hansa Rostock)
17	MF	GER	André Breitenreiter (to Unterhaching)

No.	Pos.	Nation	Player
28	MF	GER	Christian Brand (to Hansa Rostock)

== Results ==
=== DFB-Pokal ===
==== Third round ====
13 October 1999	Chemnitzer FC	2–3	VfL Wolfsburg	Chemnitz
	Mehlhorn 24' (pen.); Skela 86'	Report (in German)	Nowak 38'; Laudeley 45' (o.g.); Juskowiak 57'	Stadium: Stadion an der Gellertstraße; Attendance: 5,000; Referee: Jürgen Aust (Cologne)

==== Round of 16 ====
1 December 1999	VfL Bochum	5 – 4	VfL Wolfsburg	Bochum
	Weber 41', 43'; Peschel 47' (pen.); Baştürk 58', 90'	Report (in German)	Feldhoff 28'; Thomsen 40'; Akonnor 55', 84' (pen.)	Stadium: Ruhrstadion; Attendance: 10,900; Referee: Lutz Wagner (Kriftel)

=== UEFA Cup ===
==== First round ====
14 September 1999	Wolfsburg (Germany)	2–0	(Hungary) Debrecen	VfL-Stadium, Wolfsburg
	Akonnor 61'; Juskowiak 87'	Report		Referee: Mikko Vuorela (Finland)

==== Second round ====
21 October 1999	Roda JC (Netherlands)	0–0	(Germany) Wolfsburg	Sportpark Kaalheide, Kerkrade
		Report		Attendance: 7,700; Referee: Valentin Ivanov (Russia)

2 November 1999	Wolfsburg (Germany)	1–0	(Netherlands) Roda JC	VfL-Stadium, Wolfsburg
	Akonnor 87'	Report		Attendance: 7,677; Referee: Georgios Bikas (Greece)

Wolfsburg won 1–0 on aggregate.

==== Third round ====
23 November 1999	Wolfsburg (Germany)	2–3	(Spain) Atlético Madrid	VfL-Stadium, Wolfsburg
	Juskowiak 21'; Akonnor 83' (pen.)	Report	Aguilera 6', 58'; Hasselbaink 37'	Attendance: 10,700; Referee: Luc Huyghe (Belgium)

9 December 1999	Atlético Madrid (Spain)	2–1	(Germany) Wolfsburg	Vicente Calderón Stadium, Madrid
	Hasselbaink 4'; Correa 86'	Report	Akonnor 56' (pen.)	Attendance: 3,000; Referee: Leslie Irvine (Northern Ireland)

Atlético Madrid won 5–3 on aggregate.
