= Luc Ihorst =

German footballer

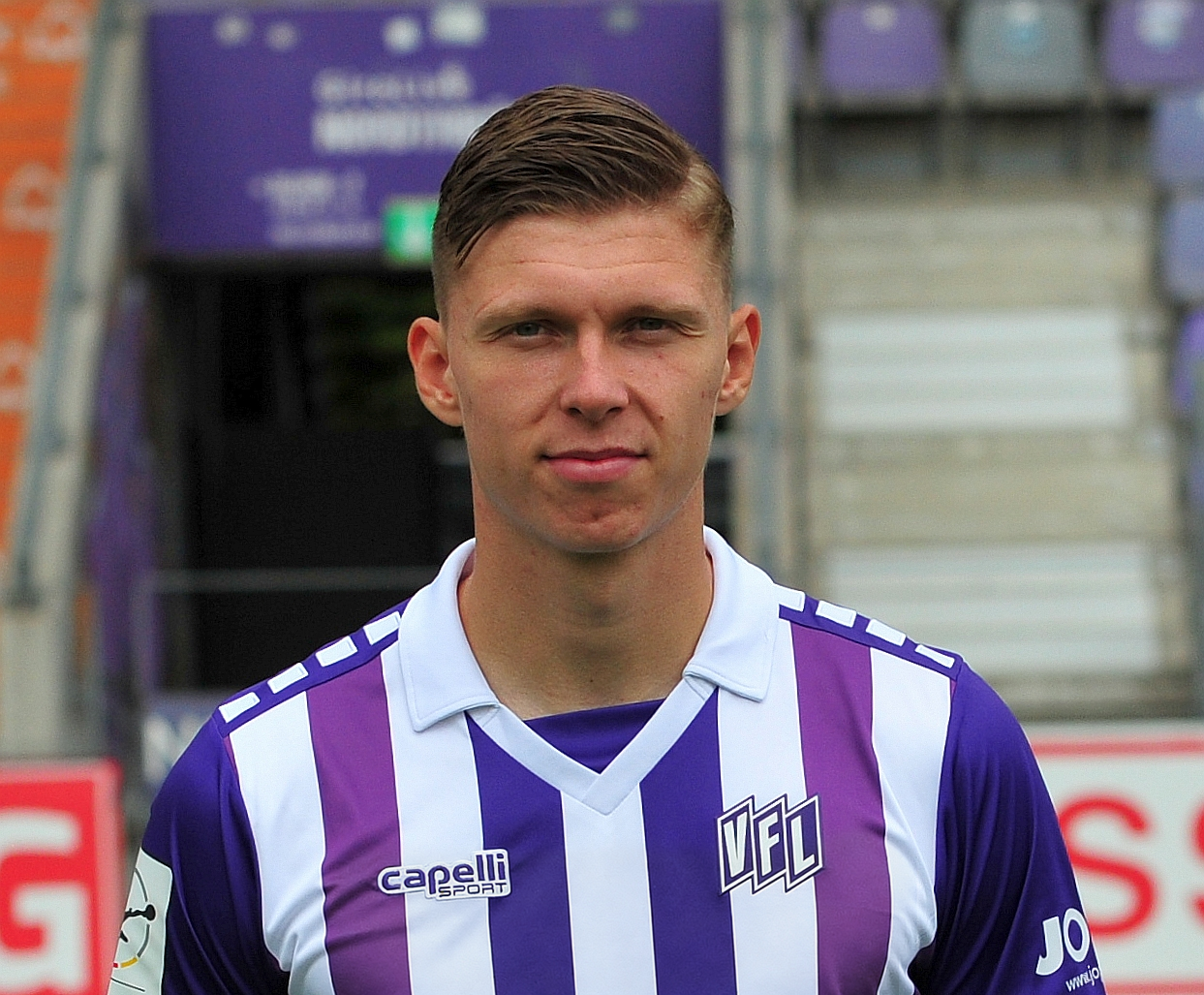
- lhorst with VfL Osnabrück in 2025

Personal information
- Date of birth: 7 March 2000 (age 26)
- Place of birth: Damme, Germany
- Height: 1.86 m (6 ft 1 in)
- Position: Forward

Team information
- Current team: Kickers Emden
- Number: 14

Youth career
- –2012: Schwarz-Weiß Osterfeine
- 2012–2019: Werder Bremen

Senior career*
Years	Team	Apps	(Gls)
2019–2022	Werder Bremen II	23	(6)
2019–2022	Werder Bremen	1	(0)
2020–2021	→ VfL Osnabrück (loan)	16	(2)
2021–2022	→ Eintracht Braunschweig (loan)	19	(3)
2022–2024	Eintracht Braunschweig	18	(0)
2024–2025	SpVgg Unterhaching	25	(5)
2025–2026	VfL Osnabrück	16	(0)
2026–	Kickers Emden	10	(11)

International career
2017	Germany U18	3	(0)
- * Club domestic league appearances and goals as of 22 September 2026

Luc Ihorst (born 7 March 2000) is a German professional footballer who plays as a forward for Regionalliga Nord club Kickers Emden.

== Career ==
A youth product for Bundesliga club Werder Bremen, Ihorst made his debut for Werder Bremen II, the club's reserve side, on 27 July 2019 in a Regionalliga Nord against Lüneburger SK Hansa. He scored his first goal for Werder Bremen II on 31 August 2019 against Schwarz-Weiß Rehden. His 22nd-minute goal was the second in a 3–1 victory.

On 21 September 2019, Ihorst was called up to Werder Bremen's first-team and started on the bench in a Bundesliga match against RB Leipzig. He came on as an 80th-minute substitute for Josh Sargent to make his professional debut.

In August 2020, Ihorst agreed a contract extension with Werder Bremen and joined 2. Bundesliga side VfL Osnabrück on a two-year loan. He made 18 league appearances scoring two goals.

In June 2021 it was announced he would join Eintracht Braunschweig, newly relegated to the 3. Liga, on loan for the 2021–22 season. During the season, he was troubled by injuries and scored 3 goals in 19 league appearances while his club secured a return to the 2. Bundesliga thanks to placing third.

In June 2022 Ihorst's permanent move to Eintracht Braunschweig was announced. He signed a two-year contract.

On 23 June 2024, Ihorst signed a two-year contract with SpVgg Unterhaching in 3. Liga.

== Career statistics ==
As of 12 June 2022

Appearances and goals by club, season and competition
Club	Season	League			DFB-Pokal		Other		Total	
Club	Season	Division	Apps	Goals	Apps	Goals	Apps	Goals	Apps	Goals
Werder Bremen	2019–20	Bundesliga	1	0	0	0	0	0	1	0
Werder Bremen II	2019–20	Regionalliga Nord	23	6	0	0	0	0	23	6
VfL Osnabrück (loan)	2020–21	2. Bundesliga	16	2	2	0	0	0	18	2
Eintracht Braunschweig (loan)	2021–22	3. Liga	19	3	1	0	0	0	20	4
Career total			40	8	2	0	0	0	42	8

== Honours ==
VfL Osnabrück

- 3. Liga: 2025–26
