= Florian Fulland =

German footballer and manager

Personal information
- Date of birth: 15 September 1984 (age 42)
- Place of birth: Detmold, West Germany
- Height: 1.83 m (6 ft 0 in)
- Position: Defender

Team information
- Current team: Arminia Bielefeld (U19 manager)

Youth career
- –1998: SpVg Hagen-Hardissen

Senior career*
Years	Team	Apps	(Gls)
–2004	SC Paderborn II		
2004–2005	SC Paderborn		
2005–2012	Delbrücker SC	117	(7)
2012–2014	SC Paderborn II		

Managerial career
- 2016: SC Paderborn (U19)
- 2016: SC Paderborn (assistant)
- 2016: SC Paderborn (interim manager)
- 2016–2018: SC Paderborn (U19)
- 2019–2021: VfL Osnabrück (U19)
- 2021: VfL Osnabrück (interim manager)
- 2021: VfL Osnabrück (assistant)
- 2021–: Arminia Bielefeld (U19)
- * Club domestic league appearances and goals

Florian Fulland (born 15 September 1984) is a German former footballer.

== Coaching career ==
=== SC Paderborn ===
After returning to SC Paderborn 07 as a player, Fulland was involved in the club's youth development work as a sports director for various age groups. For a time, he was promoted to head of the youth development center and from March 2016, he also coached the club's U19 team. On 24 October 2016, he was promoted to the first team staff as an assistant coach to René Müller, following the departure of assistant Markus Feldhoff, who had moved to SV Werder Bremen. However, he remained in charge of the U19s.

On 21 November 2016, Fulland was announced as the interim replacement for René Müller at Paderborn, as the club were struggling. He managed two 3. Liga matches, with a record of one draw and one loss and was replaced on 6 December 2016. After being replaced, he returned to coach the U19s. In June 2018, Fulland stepped down from his post.

=== VfL Osnabrück ===
Ahead of the 2019–20 season, Fulland was appointed U19 manager at VfL Osnabrück.

After Marco Grote was dismissed as head coach of the second-division club in February 2021, Fulland was named interim coach for VfL Osnabrück on 15 February 2021. After Markus Feldhoff was hired as the new head coach on 3 March 2021, Fulland continued as a part of the first team staff as an assistant coach and also as U19 manager.

Fulland announced his departure from Osnabrück on 7 October 2021.

=== Arminia Bielefeld ===
On 7 October 2021, Fulland was presented as the new U19 manager of Arminia Bielefeld.
