= Lars Kehl =

German footballer

Personal information
- Date of birth: 8 April 2002 (age 24)
- Place of birth: Hofstetten, Baden-Württemberg, Germany
- Height: 1.78 m (5 ft 10 in)
- Position: Midfielder

Team information
- Current team: SV Darmstadt
- Number: 22

Youth career
- –2012: SC Hofstetten
- 2012–2013: Offenburger FV
- 2013–2021: SC Freiburg

Senior career*
Years	Team	Apps	(Gls)
2021–2023	SC Freiburg II	66	(10)
2023–2026	Osnabrück	80	(16)
2026–	SV Darmstadt	0	(0)

International career
2018–2019	Germany U17	15	(2)
- * Club domestic league appearances and goals as of 28 May 2026

Lars Kehl (born 8 April 2002) is a German professional footballer who plays as a midfielder for 2. Bundesliga club SV Darmstadt.

== Club career ==
On 26 June 2026, Kehl signed with SV Darmstadt in 2. Bundesliga.

== International career ==
Kehl has represented Germany at youth international level.

== Career statistics ==
As of 7 March 2026

Appearances and goals by club, season and competition
Club	Season	League			DFB-Pokal		Continental		Other		Total	
Club	Season	Division	Apps	Goals	Apps	Goals	Apps	Goals	Apps	Goals	Apps	Goals
SC Freiburg II	2021–22	3. Liga	30	2	—		—		—		30	2
SC Freiburg II	2022–23	3. Liga	36	8	—		—		—		36	8
SC Freiburg II	Total		66	10	—		—		—		66	10
VfL Osnabrück	2023–24	2. Bundesliga	10	1	1	0	—		—		10	1
VfL Osnabrück	2024–25	3. Liga	34	7	0	0	—		2 (Note: Appearance(s) in Lower Saxony Cup)	0	36	7
VfL Osnabrück	2025–26	3. Liga	27	5	0	0	—		1	0	28	5
VfL Osnabrück	Total		71	13	1	0	—		3	0	74	13
Career total			137	23	1	0	0	0	3	0	140	23

== Honours ==
VfL Osnabrück

- 3. Liga: 2025–26
