= Robin Meißner =

German footballer

Personal information
- Full name: Robin Maximilian Meißner
- Date of birth: 8 October 1999 (age 27)
- Place of birth: Hamburg, Germany
- Height: 1.82 m (6 ft 0 in)
- Position: Centre-forward

Team information
- Current team: VfL Osnabrück
- Number: 11

Youth career
- –2012: Willinghusener SC
- 2012–2018: FC St. Pauli

Senior career*
Years	Team	Apps	(Gls)
2017–2020	FC St. Pauli II	44	(9)
2020–2021	Hamburger SV II	15	(7)
2021–2023	Hamburger SV	14	(3)
2022	→ Hansa Rostock (loan)	8	(1)
2022–2023	→ Viktoria Köln (loan)	37	(12)
2023–	Dynamo Dresden	61	(10)
2025–2026	→ VfL Osnabrück (loan)	36	(14)
2026–	VfL Osnabrück	1	(1)

International career
2017	Germany U18	1	(0)
- * Club domestic league appearances and goals as of 28 May 2026

Robin Maximilian Meißner (born 8 October 1999) is a German professional footballer who plays as a centre-forward for 2. Bundesliga club VfL Osnabrück.

== Career ==
Meißner made his professional debut for Hamburger SV in the 2. Bundesliga on 1 March 2021, coming on as a substitute in the first minute of second-half stoppage time against his former club FC St. Pauli. The away match finished as a 1–0 loss for Hamburg.

On 30 January 2022, Meißner joined Hansa Rostock on loan until the end of the season. On 27 July 2022, he moved on a new loan to Viktoria Köln.

On 4 July 2023, Meißner moved to Dynamo Dresden on a two-year deal. On 13 August 2025, he was loaned by VfL Osnabrück in 3. Liga. After helping the team securing promotion, Meißner signed a permanent contract with VfL Osnabrück.

== Honours ==
VfL Osnabrück

- 3. Liga: 2025–26
