= Marc Heider =

American soccer player (born 1986)

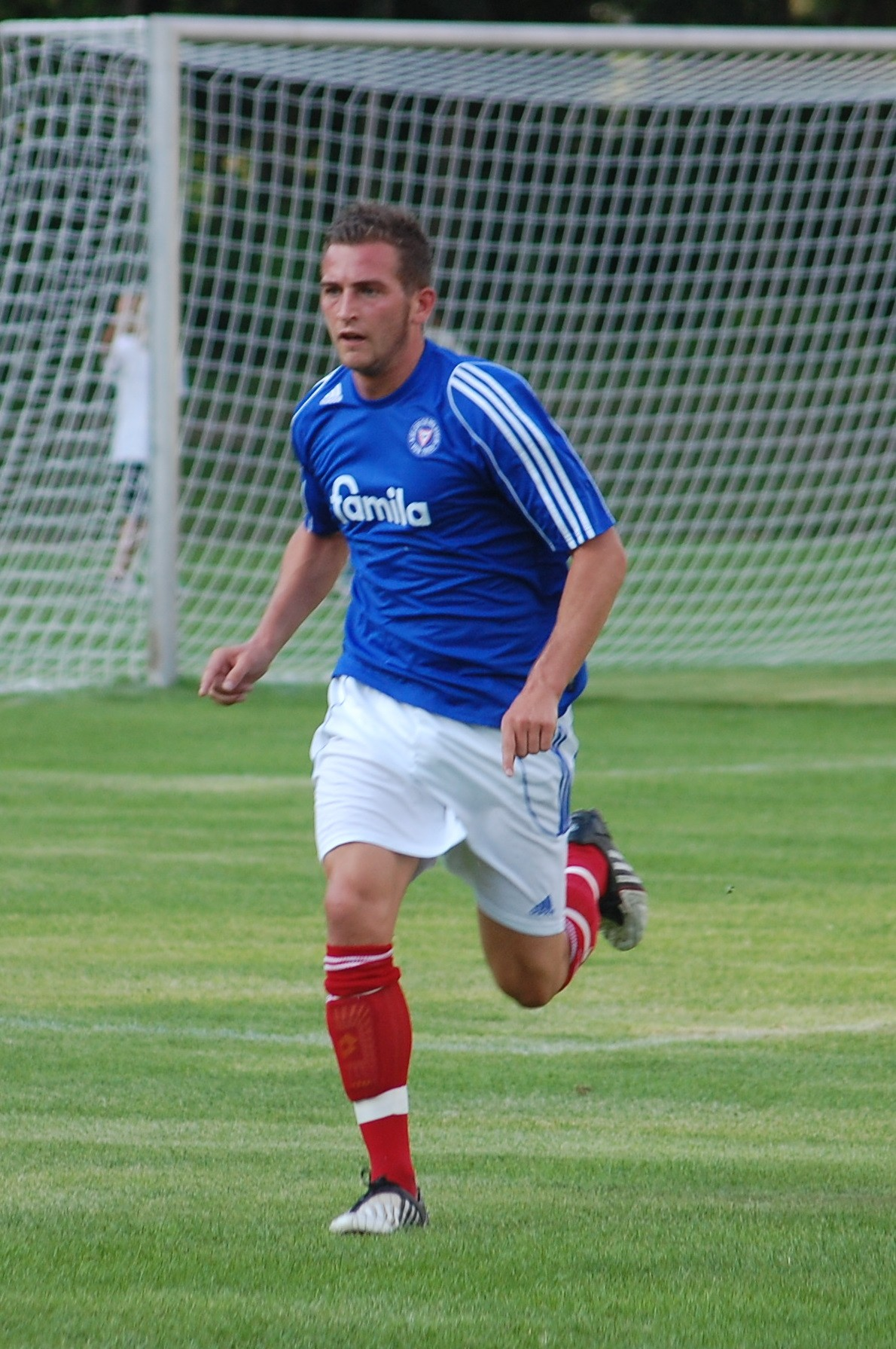
- Heider with Holstein Kiel

Personal information
- Date of birth: 18 May 1986 (age 40)
- Place of birth: Sacramento, California, United States
- Height: 1.86 m (6 ft 1 in)
- Position: Forward

Team information
- Current team: Sportfreunde Lotte
- Number: 20

Youth career
- –2003: TuS Recke
- 2003–2005: VfL Osnabrück

Senior career*
Years	Team	Apps	(Gls)
2005–2006	VfL Osnabrück	16	(2)
2006–2009	Werder Bremen II	84	(16)
2009–2010	Holstein Kiel II	5	(4)
2009–2016	Holstein Kiel	221	(73)
2016–2023	VfL Osnabrück	225	(43)
2023–	Sportfreunde Lotte	75	(41)
- * Club domestic league appearances and goals as of 12 October 2025

Marc Heider (born 18 May 1986) is an American professional soccer player who plays as a forward for Sportfreunde Lotte.

== Career ==
Heider began his career at TuS Recke before being scouted in 2003 for the youth team of VfL Osnabrück. He was promoted to the senior team of Osnabrück and played sixteen games scoring two goals. In July 2006 Heider transferred to Werder Bremen where he played for the reserve team and was released on 30 May 2009. On 26 June, he signed for Holstein Kiel.

Heider returned to VfL Osnabrück in 2016 and helped the club to promotion to the 2. Bundesliga in the 2018–19 season. In the 2. Bundesliga he made 54 appearances scoring 9 goals. At the end of the 2022–23 season he achieved 2. Bundesliga promotion for a second time with Osnabrück.

Heider moved to Sportfreunde Lotte in summer 2023, with whom he promoted to the Regionalliga in 2023–24. In June 2024 he extended his contract with Sportfreunde Lotte, where he featured as a playing assistant coach.

== Personal life ==
Born in Sacramento, United States, Heider is the son of a pilot. He grew up in Recke, North Rhine-Westphalia, and has German citizenship.

== Honors ==
VfL Osnabrück

- 3. Liga: 2018–19; promotion as runner-up 2022–23
