= Tony Lesueur =

French footballer (born 2000)

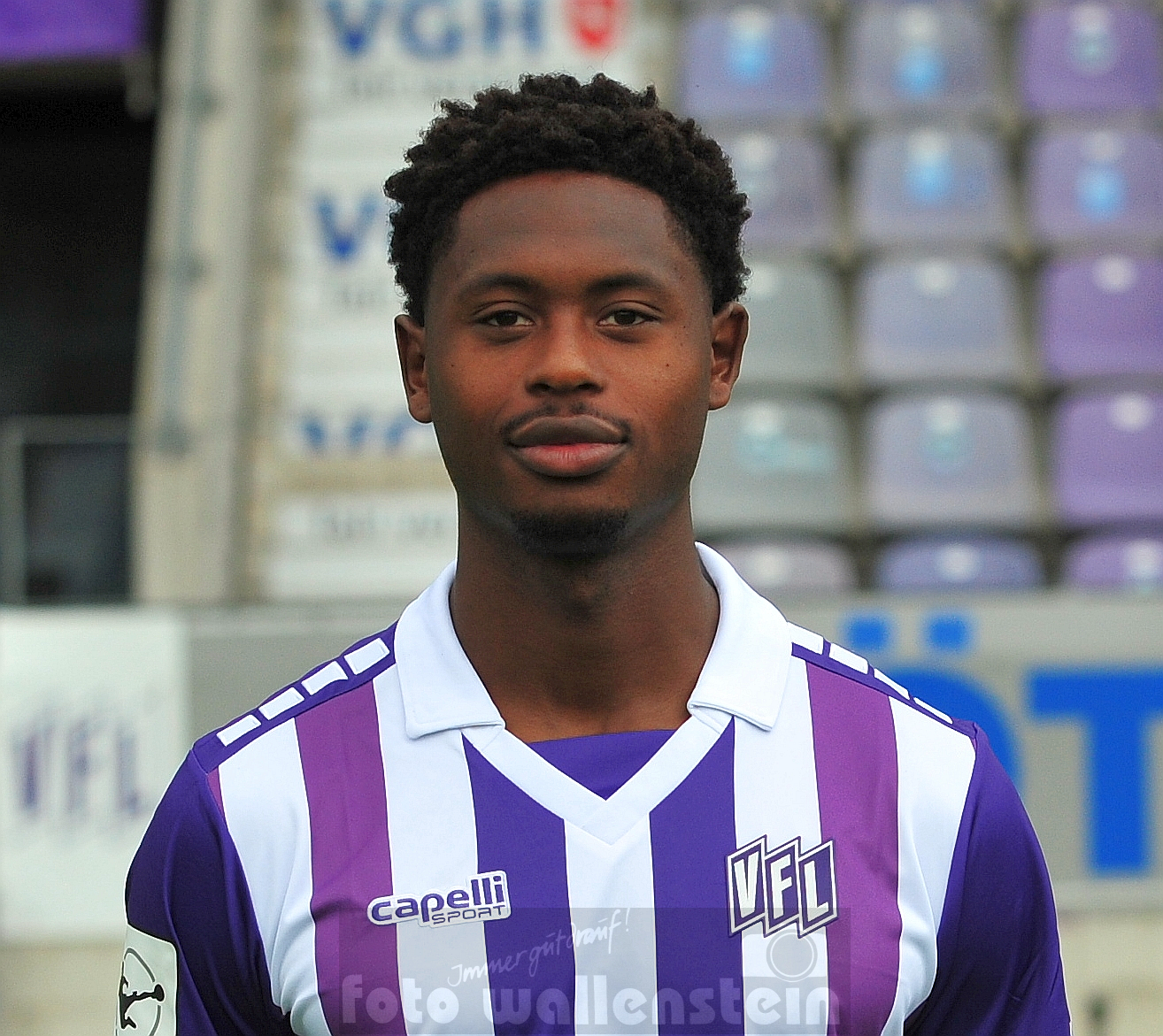
- Lesueur with VfL Osnabrück in 2025

Personal information
- Date of birth: 19 August 2000 (age 26)
- Place of birth: Épinay-sur-Seine, France
- Height: 1.77 m (5 ft 10 in)
- Position: Midfielder

Team information
- Current team: VfL Osnabrück
- Number: 23

Youth career
- 2006–2015: Chambly
- 2015–2018: Sochaux

Senior career*
Years	Team	Apps	(Gls)
2018–2020	Sochaux B	26	(0)
2020–2022	Chambly	10	(0)
2022–2024	Schwarz-Weiß Rehden	57	(9)
2024–2025	Phönix Lübeck	33	(4)
2025–	VfL Osnabrück	29	(2)
- * Club domestic league appearances and goals as of 28 May 2026

Tony Lesueur (born 19 August 2000) is a French professional footballer who plays as a midfielder for German 2. Bundesliga club VfL Osnabrück.

== Club career ==
Lesueur joined the academy of Chambly at the age of six, and moved to the academy of Sochaux nine years later. He returned to Chambly in 2020. Lesueur made his professional debut with Chambly in a 1–0 Ligue 2 loss to Clermont on 13 February 2021.

== Honours ==
VfL Osnabrück

- 3. Liga: 2025–26
