= Fridolin Wagner =

German footballer

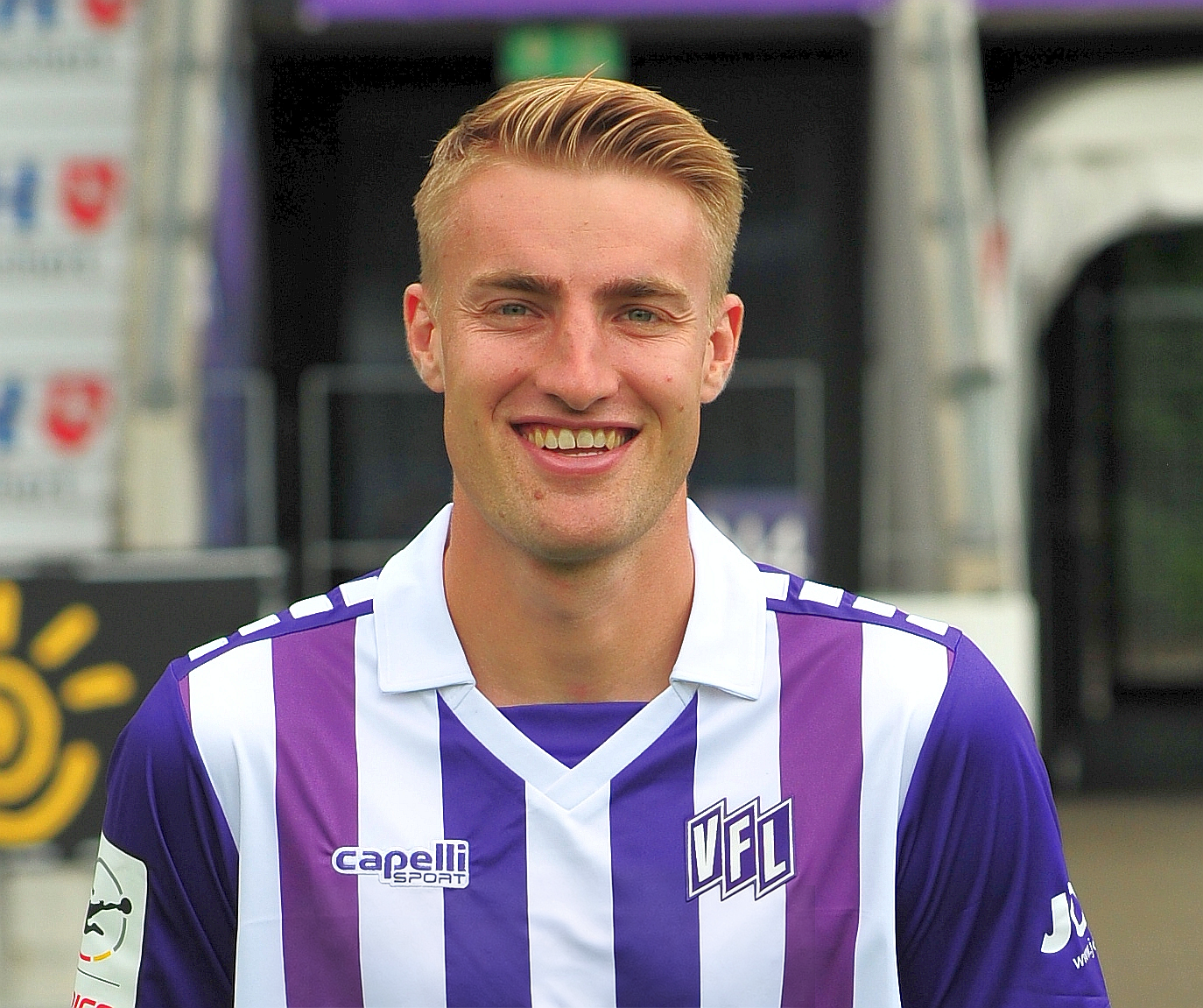
- Wagner with VfL Osnabrück in 2025

Personal information
- Date of birth: 23 September 1997 (age 29)
- Place of birth: Leipzig, Germany
- Height: 1.82 m (6 ft 0 in)
- Position: Midfielder

Team information
- Current team: VfL Osnabrück
- Number: 26

Youth career
- –2011: 1. FC Lokomotive Leipzig
- 2011–2014: RB Leipzig

Senior career*
| Years | Team | Apps | (Gls) |
| 2014–2017 | RB Leipzig II | 37 | (3) |
| 2017–2018 | FSV Zwickau | 16 | (0) |
| 2018–2019 | Werder Bremen II | 45 | (3) |
| 2019–2020 | Preußen Münster | 28 | (2) |
| 2020–2021 | KFC Uerdingen 05 | 27 | (3) |
| 2021–2024 | Waldhof Mannheim | 91 | (12) |
| 2024–2025 | Emmen | 32 | (2) |
| 2025– | VfL Osnabrück | 34 | (2) |

International career
| 2013 | Germany U16 | 4 | (0) |
| 2014–2015 | Germany U18 | 4 | (0) |
| 2015 | Germany U19 | 3 | (0) |
- * Club domestic league appearances and goals as of 28 May 2026

Fridolin Wagner (born 23 September 1997) is a German professional footballer who plays as a midfielder for 2. Bundesliga club VfL Osnabrück.

He has been a youth international for Germany on multiple levels.

== Career ==
In January 2017, Wagner joined 3. Liga side Werder Bremen II from league rivals FSV Zwickau.

In May 2019, it was announced he would join SC Preußen Münster for the 2019–20 season having agreed a contract until 2021. He followed coach Sven Hübscher who would also join the club from Werder Bremen II in the summer.

On 30 July 2024, Wagner moved to Emmen in the Netherlands on a two-year deal.

== Honours ==
VfL Osnabrück

- 3. Liga: 2025–26
