= Niklas Sauter =

German footballer (born 2003)

Personal information
- Date of birth: 6 April 2003 (age 23)
- Place of birth: Münsterlingen, Switzerland
- Height: 1.86 m (6 ft 1 in)
- Position: Goalkeeper

Team information
- Current team: VfL Osnabrück
- Number: 1

Youth career
- –2016: SC Konstanz-Wollmatingen
- 2016–2022: SC Freiburg

Senior career*
Years	Team	Apps	(Gls)
2021–2025	SC Freiburg II	37	(0)
2025–	VfL Osnabrück	1	(0)

International career
2019	Germany U17	1	(0)
- * Club domestic league appearances and goals as of 28 May 2026

Niklas Sauter (born 6 April 2003) is a German professional footballer who plays as a goalkeeper for 2. Bundesliga club VfL Osnabrück.

== Club career ==
Sauter grew up in Konstanz and joined SC Freiburg from SC Konstanz-Wollmatingen in 2016. Having come through Freiburg's youth ranks, he became part of SC Freiburg II's squad in 2021.

He appeared on the bench for Freiburg's senior squad on one occasion in September 2023, in an away Europa League game against Olympiacos.

On 29 January 2025, Sauter signed with VfL Osnabrück in 3. Liga.

== International career ==
Sauter has represented Germany at youth international level.

== Career statistics ==
As of 1 July 2022

Appearances and goals by club, season and competition
Club	Season	League			Cup		Continental		Other		Total	
Club	Season	Division	Apps	Goals	Apps	Goals	Apps	Goals	Apps	Goals	Apps	Goals
SC Freiburg II	2021–22	3. Liga	5	0	—		—		—		5	0
Career total			5	0	0	0	0	0	0	0	5	0
