= Bjarke Jacobsen =

Danish footballer (born 1993)

- Jacobsen in 2025.

Personal information
- Full name: Bjarke Halfdan Jacobsen
- Date of birth: 21 August 1993 (age 33)
- Place of birth: Helsinge, Denmark
- Height: 1.90 m (6 ft 3 in)
- Position: Midfielder

Team information
- Current team: VfL Osnabrück
- Number: 15

Youth career
- Helsinge SI
- Nordsjælland

Senior career*
Years	Team	Apps	(Gls)
2012–2014	Helsingør	16	(2)
2014–2015	AB	16	(2)
2015–2017	Vendsyssel	69	(2)
2017–2021	Horsens	105	(4)
2021–2025	SV Wehen Wiesbaden	105	(3)
2025–	VfL Osnabrück	34	(6)

International career
2012	Denmark U20	3	(1)
- * Club domestic league appearances and goals as of 28 May 2026

Bjarke Halfdan Jacobsen (born 21 August 1993) is a Danish professional footballer who plays as a midfielder for German 2. Bundesliga club VfL Osnabrück.

== Career ==
Born in Helsinge, Jacobsen is a product of the Nordsjælland youth academy. He later played for FC Helsingør, AB and Vendsyssel before moving to AC Horsens in July 2017.

In June 2021 it was announced that Jacobsen would join 3. Liga club SV Wehen Wiesbaden for the 2021–22 season.

On 12 June 2025, Jacobsen moved to VfL Osnabrück. On 6 September 2026, Jacobsen scored in a 3–1 home win for Osnabrück against Eintracht Braunschweig, his first 2. Bundesliga goal in his 28th game.

== Honours ==
VfL Osnabrück

- 3. Liga: 2025–26
