= Patrick Kammerbauer =

German footballer (born 1997)

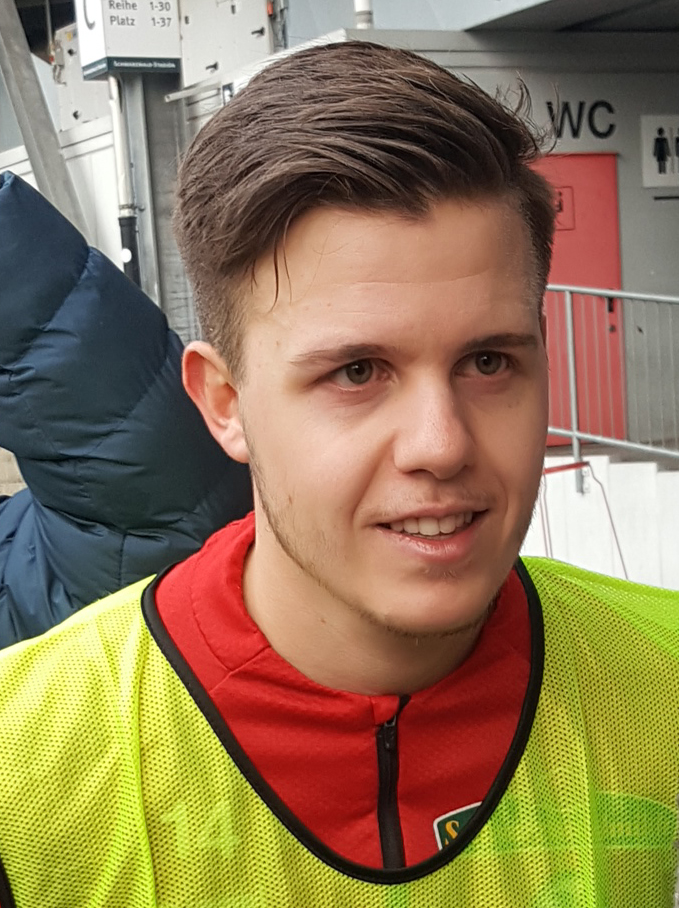
- Kammerbauer with SC Freiburg in 2019

Personal information
- Date of birth: 11 February 1997 (age 29)
- Place of birth: Weißenburg, Germany
- Height: 1.74 m (5 ft 9 in)
- Position: Defensive midfielder

Team information
- Current team: VfL Osnabrück
- Number: 31

Youth career
- –2007: DJK Raitenbuch
- 2007–2016: 1. FC Nürnberg

Senior career*
Years	Team	Apps	(Gls)
2016–2018	1. FC Nürnberg II	8	(0)
2016–2018	1. FC Nürnberg	31	(1)
2018–2022	SC Freiburg II	41	(2)
2018–2022	SC Freiburg	1	(0)
2019	→ Holstein Kiel (loan)	4	(0)
2019–2021	→ Eintracht Braunschweig (loan)	48	(0)
2023–2025	SC Verl	73	(1)
2025–	VfL Osnabrück	35	(3)

International career
2012	Germany U15	5	(0)
2012–2013	Germany U16	2	(0)
2013–2014	Germany U17	12	(0)
2015	Germany U18	1	(0)
2015	Germany U19	1	(0)
- * Club domestic league appearances and goals as of 28 May 2026

Patrick Kammerbauer (born 11 February 1997) is a German professional footballer who plays as a defensive midfielder for 2. Bundesliga club VfL Osnabrück.

== Career ==
In January 2018, Kammerbauer joined SC Freiburg after rejecting 1. FC Nürnberg's offer to extend his contract which was due to expire in summer 2018. The transfer fee paid to Nürnberg was reported as in the region of €200,000 to 300,000.

On 28 January 2019, Kammerbauer joined Holstein Kiel on a loan deal until summer 2020 with an option to make the deal permanent.

On 2 September 2019, Kammerbauer joined Eintracht Braunschweig on a season-long loan deal with the option of a second year. Due to Eintracht Braunschweig's promotion to the 2. Bundesliga the loan was automatically extended by another year.

On 1 February 2023, Kammerbauer signed with 3. Liga club SC Verl.

On 27 May 2025, Kammerbauer moved to VfL Osnabrück.

== Honours ==
VfL Osnabrück

- 3. Liga: 2025–26
