= Marco Grote =

German football player and manager

Personal information
- Date of birth: 11 October 1972 (age 54)
- Place of birth: Bremen, Germany
- Height: 1.85 m (6 ft 1 in)
- Position: Right-back

Senior career*
Years	Team	Apps	(Gls)
1994–1997	FC Bremerhaven	26	(0)
1997–1999	VfB Oldenburg	49	(0)
2000–2004	Hamburger SV II	72	(4)
Total		147	(4)

Managerial career
- 2020–2021: VfL Osnabrück
- 2022: Apollon Smyrnis
- 2022-2025: Union Berlin (U-19)
- 2023: Union Berlin (interim)
- 2024: Union Berlin (interim)
- 2026-: Carl Zeiss Jena
- * Club domestic league appearances and goals

Marco Grote (born 11 October 1972) is a German professional football manager and former player.

== Playing career ==
Grote played club football for FC Bremerhaven, VfB Oldenburg and Hamburger SV II.

== Managerial career ==
Grote was assistant manager at VfB Lübeck between 2004 and 2006, and managed various youth teams at SV Werder Bremen between 2008 and 2020.

He was appointed as manager at VfL Osnabrück in July 2020. He was sacked on 15 February 2021. He joined Union Berlin as the U-19 manager in May 2022, and was appointed interim manager of the Bundesliga team in November 2023 After one game, he was replaced by Nenad Bjelica. In May 2024, he again took over as the interim manager. For the 2026/27 season, he became the coach of the Regionalliga side Carl Zeiss Jena.
