= Markus Feldhoff =

German footballer and manager

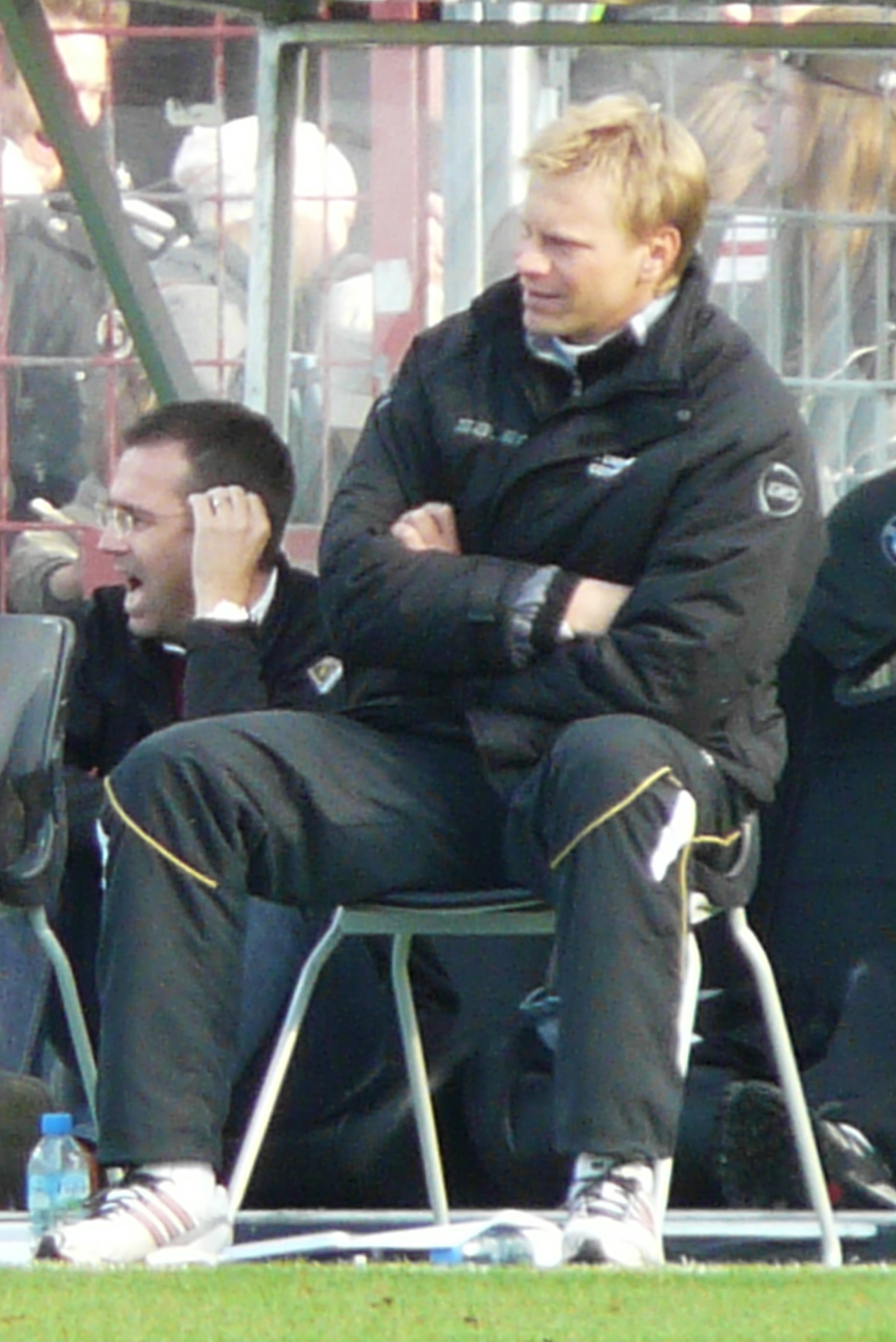
- Feldhoff with Energie Cottbus in 2009

Personal information
- Date of birth: 29 August 1974 (age 52)
- Place of birth: Oberhausen, West Germany
- Height: 1.85 m (6 ft 1 in)
- Position: Striker

Youth career
- Sportfreunde Königshardt
- Bayer Uerdingen

Senior career*
Years	Team	Apps	(Gls)
1992–1995	Bayer Uerdingen	72	(13)
1995–1998	Bayer Leverkusen	77	(14)
1998–1999	Borussia Mönchengladbach	18	(1)
1999–2001	VfL Wolfsburg	20	(3)
2002	Energie Cottbus	5	(0)
2003–2004	KFC Uerdingen 05	35	(24)
2004–2008	VfL Osnabrück	55	(24)
2007	VfL Osnabrück II	2	(1)
Total		284	(80)

International career
	Germany U21	13	(0)

Managerial career
- 2006–2007: TV Jahn Hiesfeld
- 2008: SSVg Velbert
- 2011: Energie Cottbus (caretaker)
- 2021: VfL Osnabrück
- 2024: VfL Bochum (caretaker)
- * Club domestic league appearances and goals

Markus Feldhoff (born 29 August 1974) is a German former football player and manager.

== Club career ==
Earlier in his career Feldhoff played for Bayer Uerdingen, Bayer 04 Leverkusen, Borussia Mönchengladbach, VfL Wolfsburg and FC Energie Cottbus.

In his career, he played 158 games and scored 25 goals. Feldhoff collected 13 caps for the German U21 squad. Following a series of injuries he announced his retirement from active play.

== Coaching career ==
In December 2006, while still playing for Osnabrück and was recovering from a cruciate ligament rupture, Feldhoff took over as manager at Landesliga club TV Jahn Hiesfeld, which he was unable to save from relegation to the Bezirksliga. Immediately before the start of the 2007/08 season, he decided to give up the post again in order to be able to concentrate fully on his active career after a lengthy injury layoff.

In January 2008, however, he had to end his career as a professional footballer due to another knee injury. In April 2008 it was confirmed, that Feldhoff would take charge of SSVg Velbert from the 2008-09 season. However, he resigned from his position already in October 2008. In December 2008, Feldhoff was appointed assistant coach of Claus-Dieter Wollitz at VfL Osnabrück under an internship contract that ran until 30 June 2010.

For the 2009-10 season, Feldhoff followed Claus-Dieter Wollitz to FC Energie Cottbus. Following Wollitz's resignation, Feldhoff took over the team as interim coach on 8 December 2011 until the winter break. Feldhoff decided to resign in December 2012, as he wanted to work as a head coach.

In June 2014, Feldhoff was appointed U-19 manager at SC Paderborn 07. In March 2016, he was promoted to the first team staff, as assistant coach to René Müller. In October 2016, Feldhoff left his job at SC Paderborn 07 to join Bundesliga club Werder Bremen in a similar position. With the dismissal of manager Alexander Nouri a year later, Werder also parted ways with Feldhoff.

He followed Alexander Nouri to FC Ingolstadt, when the manager and his staff, including Feldhoff, was hired on 24 September 2018. After eight games without a win, Feldhoff and co. was fired at the end of November 2018.

A year later, at the end of November 2019, Felhoff and Nouri became assistant coaches of Jürgen Klinsmann at Hertha BSC. Feldhoff then assisted Nouri in four Bundesliga matches after Klinsmann resigned as head coach. Nouri and Feldhoff's involvement ended in early April 2020.

He was appointed as the new head coach of VfL Osnabrück on 3 March 2021. After the team got relegated to the 3. Liga, his contract was not renewed.

Bundesliga club VfL Bochum announced Feldhoff as assistant coach in July 2023. He took over the interim head coaching role in October 2024 before being replaced two weeks later.

== Career statistics ==
Appearances and goals by club, season and competition
Club	Season	League			National cup		Europe		Other		Total	
Club	Season	Division	Apps	Goals	Apps	Goals	Apps	Goals	Apps	Goals	Apps	Goals
Bayer Uerdingen	1992–93	Bundesliga	5	0	–		–		–		5	0
Bayer Uerdingen	1993–94	2. Bundesliga	34	6	1	1	4 (Note: Appearances in the UEFA Intertoto Cup)	3	–		39	10
Bayer Uerdingen	1994–95	Bundesliga	33	7	1	0	–		–		34	7
Bayer Uerdingen	Total		72	13	2	1	4	3	–		78	17
Bayer Leverkusen	1995–96	Bundesliga	33	3	5	1	4	0	0	0	42	4
Bayer Leverkusen	1996–97	Bundesliga	22	8	1	0	0	0	0	0	23	8
Bayer Leverkusen	1997–98	Bundesliga	22	3	3	1	4 (Note: Appearances in the UEFA Champions League)	0	0	0	29	4
Bayer Leverkusen	Total		77	14	8	2	8	0	0	0	93	16
Borussia Mönchengladbach	1998–99	Bundesliga	18	1	1	0	–		–		19	1
VfL Wolfsburg	1999–00	Bundesliga	18	2	2	1	2 (Note: Appearances in the UEFA Cup)	0	–		22	3
VfL Wolfsburg	2001–02	Bundesliga	2	1	–		1	0	–		3	1
VfL Wolfsburg	Total		20	3	2	1	3	0	–		25	4
Energie Cottbus	2001–02	Bundesliga	2	0	–		–		–		2	0
Energie Cottbus	2002–03	Bundesliga	3	0	1	0	–		–		4	0
Energie Cottbus	Total		5	0	1	0	–		–		6	0
Bayer Uerdingen	2002–03	Regionalliga Nord	8	2	–		–		–		8	2
Bayer Uerdingen	2003–04	Regionalliga Nord	27	22	1	0	–		–		28	22
Bayer Uerdingen	Total		35	24	–		–		–		35	24
VfL Osnabrück	2004–05	Regionalliga Nord	25	16	1	2	–		–		26	18
VfL Osnabrück	2005–06	Regionalliga Nord	26	8	2	2	–		–		28	10
VfL Osnabrück	2006–07	Regionalliga Nord	4	0	–		–		–		4	0
VfL Osnabrück	Total		55	24	3	4	–		–		58	28
VfL Osnabrück II	2007–08	Oberliga Nord	2	1	–		–		–		2	1
Career total			284	80	18	8	15	3	0	0	317	91

== Managerial statistics ==
As of match played 2 November 2024

Managerial record by team and tenure
Team	From	To	Record				
Team	From	To	G	W	D	L	Win %
SSVg Velbert	1 July 2008	8 October 2008	1	0	1	0	0.00
Energie Cottbus (caretaker)	8 December 2011	31 December 2011	2	0	1	1	0.00
VfL Osnabrück	3 March 2021	30 June 2021	13	4	2	7	30.77
VfL Bochum (caretaker)	21 October 2024	3 November 2024	3	0	0	3	0.00
Total			19	4	4	11	21.05
