= VfL Osnabrück =

Sports club in Germany

- Full name: Verein für Leibesübungen von 1899 e.V. Osnabrück
- Nickname: die Lila-Weißen (The Purple-Whites)
- Founded: 1899; 127 years ago
- Ground: Stadion an der Bremer Brücke
- Capacity: 15,741
- Chairman: Holger Elixmann
- Head coach: Timo Schultz
- League: 2. Bundesliga
- 2025–26: 3. Liga, 1st of 20 (promoted)
- Website: vfl.de
Home colours	Away colours	Third colours

VfL Osnabrück is a German multi-sport club in Osnabrück, Lower Saxony. It currently fields teams in gymnastics, swimming, table tennis, and tennis but is by far best known for its football section.

The football team currently plays in the 2. Bundesliga after winning the 2025–26 3. Liga. They are currently coached by Timo Schultz and captained by Jannik Müller.

The club has the record for most seasons played in the 2. Bundesliga without ever playing in the Bundesliga, and is 10th in the 2. Bundesliga's all-time table.

== History ==
=== Foundation to WW2 ===
The club has its origins in the coming together on 17 April 1899 of the memberships of the "wild" clubs Antipodia, Germania, and Minerva to create Fußball Club 1899 Osnabrück. This group joined Osnabrücker Ballverein 05 in 1920 to play as BV 1899 Osnabrück.

Predecessor Osnabrücker BV 05 was the product of the 1905 merger of Fußball Club Edelweiß 1902 Osnabrück and Fußball Club Alemannia Osnabrück. This club made an appearance in the quarterfinals of the regional Westdeutsche (West German) final in 1910 where they were decisively put out (2–9) by Duisburger SV.

The merger that created Verein für Leibesübungen Osnabrück took place in 1924 when BV was joined by Spiel- und Sport Osnabrück. Prior to 1921, SuS had played as the football department of the gymnastics club Osnabrücker Turnverein 1861, created in 1914 when Fußball Club 1903 Olympia Osnabrück and Fußball Club Teutonia 1902 Osnabrück became part of TV.

Established 24 June 1902, Teutonia Osnabrück also had quarterfinal appearances in the Westdeutsche final to its credit, dropping decisions to FC München-Gladbach in 1908 (0–3), and BV Dortmund (3–4) in 1909.

VfL was formally incorporated on 8 March 1925, but part of the membership of the newly formed association soon left to create a separate side called Sportclub Rapid Osnabrück – styled after well known club Rapid Vienna. Rapid came back to the fold thirteen years later in 1938 and the re-unified club adopted the light-purple colours of the returning footballers.

After the re-structuring of German football leagues in 1933 under the Third Reich, Osnabrück played second division football until winning promotion to the Gauliga Niedersachsen (I) in 1935. They were relegated after their first campaign, but returned to the top flight in 1937, capturing the division title in the 1938–39 season. The Gauliga Niedersachsen was then split into two divisions, and in each of the following two seasons VfL took the Niedersachsen-Nord title. They went on win to the overall division title in 1940, beating Hannover 96 (3–2, 2–2), but lost their title to the same club the following year (1–1, 1–3). Their Gauliga titles in 1939 and 1940 put VfL into opening round group play for the national championship, but they were unable to advance.

=== Post-War era ===
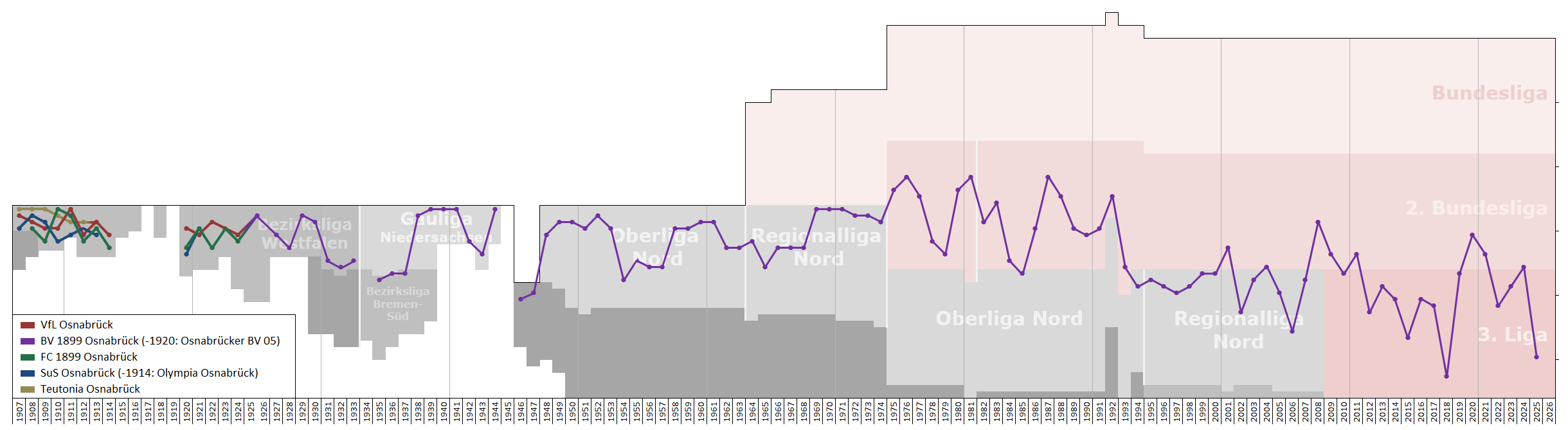
Historical chart of Osnabrück league performance

After World War II, the club returned to play as 1. FSV Osnabrück but again took up their traditional name in 1946. The team played in the Oberliga Nord (I) and delivered credible performances that left them standing fourth in the league's all-time table behind well-known sides Hamburger SV, Werder Bremen, and FC St. Pauli.

=== Golden years ===
The Bundesliga was formed in 1963 as Germany's new nation-wide professional league. The club did not qualify for play there and were seeded into second division Regionalliga Nord. Osnabrück would never make it into the Bundesliga, but did enjoy lots of success in the early years of the Bundesliga era. VfL won the Regionalliga Nord three times in a row in 1969, 1970 and 1971, and finished as runners-up in 1972 and 1973. That meant five consecutive participations in the 'Aufstiegsrunde', where the best teams from each Regionalliga competed for a place in the Bundesliga. In their first attempt, in 1969, Osnabrück finished 2nd behind Rot-Weiss Essen, only losing once in the eight-game promotion playoff. That was the closest the club came to the Bundesliga; although they would finish second in the promotion playoff round twice more, the gap to first was bigger both times.

At this time, VfL Osnabrück also had very successful departments in basketball and table tennis, becoming German basketball champions in 1969.

=== 2. Bundesliga regulars ===
In 1974, a new national second division was introduced, although split into two North and South groups. Osnabrück played in the new 2. Bundesliga Nord, but could not repeat their previous achievements. In 1978–79, Osnabrück managed one of their most famous victories, a 5–4 win over Bayern Munich in the DFB-Pokal at the Olympiastadion, with a hat-trick from Andreas Wagner. In the league, the team was far less successful, finishing 18th out of 20. This would ordinarily have seen the team relegated, but they were saved by St. Pauli and Westfalia Herne, who did not receive licenses for the next 2. Bundesliga season and had to be relegated despite finishing in the top half.

The 2. Bundesliga was reformed in 1981, becoming a single national league. A top half finish in the final year of the 2. Bundesliga Nord meant that Osnabrück qualified for the inaugural 2. Bundesliga season in 1981–82. Aside from a single season in the third tier Oberliga Nord, which they won, the club spent the entire decade in the second division. The high point of this spell was the sixth-place finish in 1986–87, the club's best ever result in the division. A year later, the club made headlines by firing coach Anton Rudinski just one game into the 1988–89 season, in which they narrowly avoided relegation. That became a trend – in both 1990 and 1991, Osnabrück only managed to remain in the 2. Bundesliga thanks to late upturns in form.

Crest from 1995 to 2017

In 1992/93, the first year of a single 2. Bundesliga post reunification, Osnabrück were finally relegated to the Oberliga Nord. After one season in the Oberliga, the leagues were reorganised again and Osnabrück would finish runner up in the new Regionalliga Nord. Although that did not mean promotion, that did qualify VfL to compete for the German amateur football championship, which they won in 1995. In 1996, long-time president and sponsor Hartwig Piepenbrock stepped back.

=== 21st century ===
After a number of years in the Regionalliga Nord, Osnabrück were finally promoted back to the 2. Bundesliga in June 2000. Having won the Regionalliga Nord for the second year in a row, Osnabrück met Union Berlin in the promotion playoff, winning on penalties thanks to goalkeeper Uwe Brunn, who made three saves in the shootout and scored the decisive penalty. However, the club was immediately relegated back to the third tier. The club won promotion again in 2002–03, but coach Jürgen Gelsdorf surprisingly left the club after promotion, and the club finished last in the 2. Bundesliga in 2003–04.

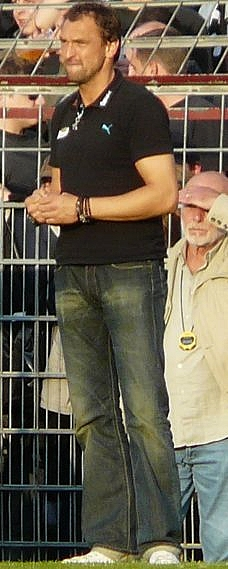
Claus-Dieter Wollitz, who had two spells as coach

After returning to the Regionalliga Nord, former player Claus-Dieter Wollitz was appointed coach. In his third season, 2006–07, Osnabrück were able to take second place in the league on the final day of the season, securing promotion. Wollitz was able to lead the team to safety in 2007–08, with a victory over Kickers Offenbach on the final day sending Offenbach down and putting Osnabrück in 12th place, their highest finish since 1988. The game was also the final appearance of Joe Enochs, who played more times for Osnabrück than any other player.

The following season, the club was relegated in controversial circumstances. After losing the relegation playoff, it emerged that defender Marcel Schuon was implicated in a match-fixing scandal, without which the club may have survived. Wollitz left the club, replaced by Karsten Baumann. Under Baumann, Osnabrück had a very successful season in 2009–10, winning the new 3. Liga and reaching the DFB-Pokal quarter finals with wins over Hamburger SV and Borussia Dortmund. Again, the club was relegated straight back down to the third tier in 2010–11, losing in the relegation playoff to Dynamo Dresden. During these years, the club developed a reputation as a 'Fahrstuhlmannschaft' (in English, a Yo-yo club).

That relegation began a spell of eight consecutive seasons in the 3. Liga. Claus-Dieter Wollitz returned in 2012, but left the team with one game remaining in the 2012–13 season after criticising the club's management. Osnabrück still finished third, qualifying for the promotion playoff, but lost to Dynamo Dresden again.

After a period of financial difficulty and little sporting success, the club returned to its traditional logo in 2017, while the name of the stadium also changed back from the Osnatel-Arena to the traditional name, Bremer Brücke. The 2017–18 season saw VfL almost relegated to the fourth tier, finishing 17th in the 3. Liga, with former player Daniel Thioune taking over as coach during the campaign, replacing Joe Enochs.

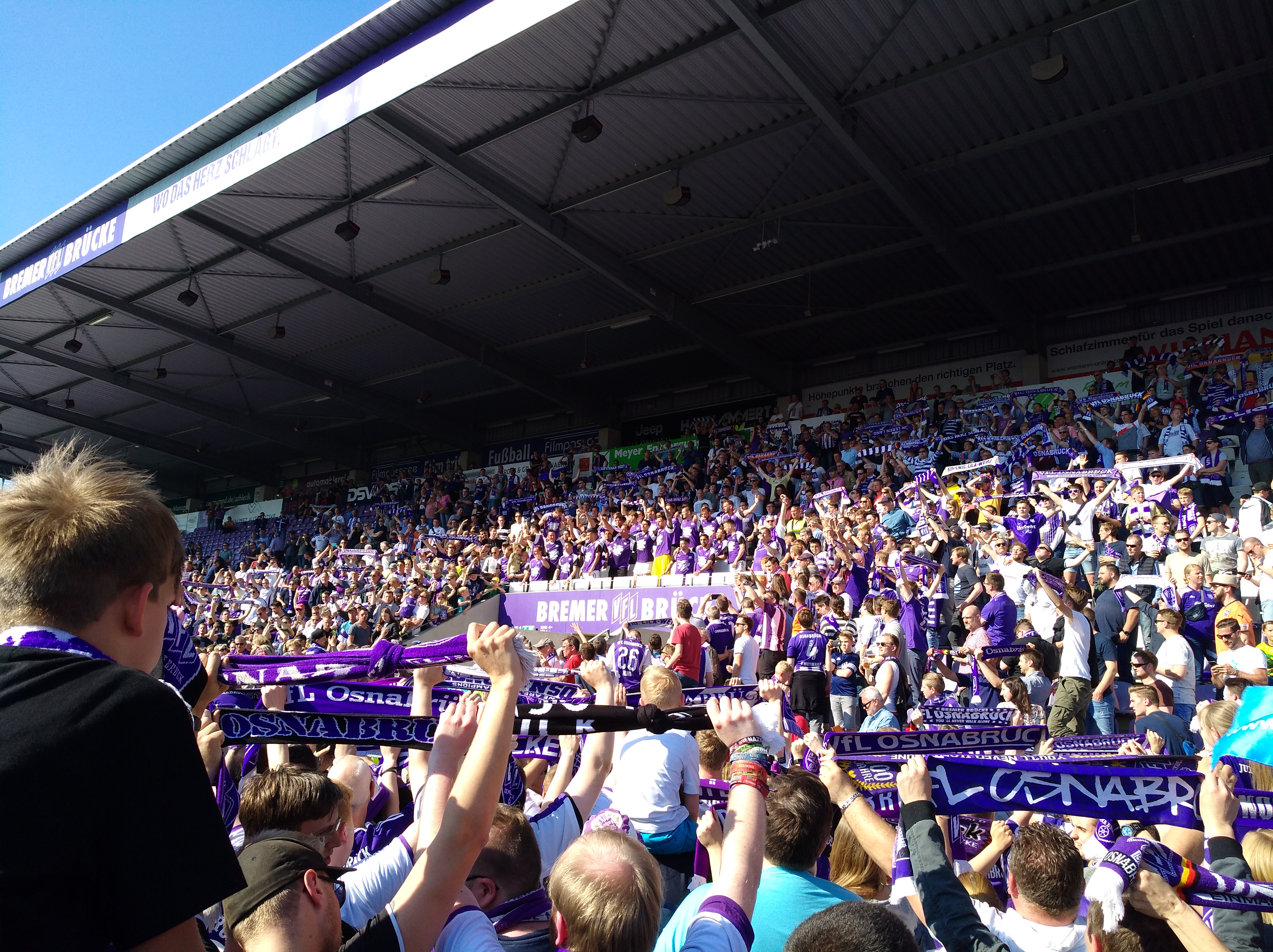
Fans in the Bremer Brücke celebrate promotion in 2019

In his first full season as coach, Thioune's Osnabrück won the 3. Liga title, winning promotion on the day the club celebrated their 120th anniversary. Back in the 2. Bundesliga, Osnabrück spent much of the season in the top half, and managed victories over big clubs like Hamburger SV and VfB Stuttgart, though they ultimately finished 13th.

Thioune left for Hamburg at the end of the campaign, and in the 2020–21 season (played mostly without fans due to the COVID-19 pandemic) the club went through two coaches, Marco Grote and Markus Feldhoff. Under Feldhoff, Osnabrück again finished in the relegation playoff spot, losing to FC Ingolstadt and returning to the 3. Liga.

== Honours ==
- Gauliga Niedersachsen (I)
  - Champions: 1939, 1940
- Regionalliga Nord (II)
  - Champions: 1969, 1970, 1971
  - Runners-up: 1972, 1973
- Oberliga Nord (III)
  - Champions: 1985
- Regionalliga Nord (III)
  - Champions: 1999, 2000
  - Runners-up: 1995, 2003
- 3. Liga (III)
  - Champions: 2009–10, 2018–19, 2025–26
- German amateur championship
  - Champions: 1995
- Lower Saxony Cup (Tiers III–V)
  - Winners: 2005, 2013, 2015, 2017, 2023

== Players ==
=== Current squad ===
As of 3 September 2026

Note: Flags indicate national team as defined under FIFA eligibility rules; some limited exceptions apply. Players may hold more than one non-FIFA nationality.

No.	Pos.	Nation	Player
1	GK	GER	Niklas Sauter
4	DF	ISR	Joel Abu Hanna
5	FW	GER	Jonathan Wensing
6	MF	GER	Bryan Henning
7	MF	GHA	Daniel-Kofi Kyereh
8	FW	GER	Leonhard Münst
10	MF	GER	Ismail Badjie
11	FW	GER	Robin Meißner
15	MF	DEN	Bjarke Jacobsen
17	FW	GER	Luca Raimund
18	MF	USA	Leon Flach (on loan from Jagiellonia Białystok)
19	FW	GER	Leon Opitz (on loan from Werder Bremen)
20	DF	GER	Theo Janotta

No.	Pos.	Nation	Player
21	MF	GER	Adrian Beck (on loan from 1. FC Heidenheim)
22	FW	GER	Bernd Riesselmann
23	FW	FRA	Tony Lesueur
24	DF	GER	Jannik Müller (captain)
25	DF	GER	Niklas Wiemann
26	MF	GER	Fridolin Wagner
27	DF	GER	Robin Fabinski
28	DF	GER	Konrad Faber
31	DF	GER	Patrick Kammerbauer
32	GK	GER	Jonas Krumrey (on loan from Holstein Kiel)
36	GK	GER	Luca Böggemann
38	DF	COD	Elias Bakatukanda (on loan from 1. FC Köln)
42	DF	USA	Jonathan Gómez (on loan from PAOK)

=== Out on loan ===
Note: Flags indicate national team as defined under FIFA eligibility rules; some limited exceptions apply. Players may hold more than one non-FIFA nationality.

No.	Pos.	Nation	Player
—	DF	GER	Lukas Bornschein (at Fortuna Düsseldorf until 30 June 2027)
—	DF	GER	Joschka Kroll (at SC Wiedenbrück until 30 June 2027)
—	DF	GER	Lion Semić (at Greifswalder FC until 30 June 2027)

No.	Pos.	Nation	Player
—	DF	GER	Ibrahim Touray (at Kickers Emden until 30 June 2027)
—	MF	GER	Rohin Shivani (at Sportfreunde Lotte until 30 June 2027)

== Staff ==
Position	Name
Head coach	(Germany) Timo Schultz
Assistant coach	(Germany) Frithjof Hansen (Iran) Ferydoon Zandi
Goalkeeper coach	(Iran) Daniel Davari
Rehabilitation trainer	(Germany) Tim Schütte
Team manager	(Germany) Leon Seelhöfer
Match analyst	(Germany) Ferhat Findik
Club doctor	(Germany) Dr. Thomas Herzig
Orthopedist	(Germany) Dr. Clemens Kruse
Head physiotherapist	(Germany) Sebastian Schwermann
Physiotherapist	(Germany) Lennart Bartling (Germany) Mailen Valle
Equipment manager	(Germany) Mario Richter
Sports psychologist	(Germany) Manfred Glüsenkamp

== Stadium ==
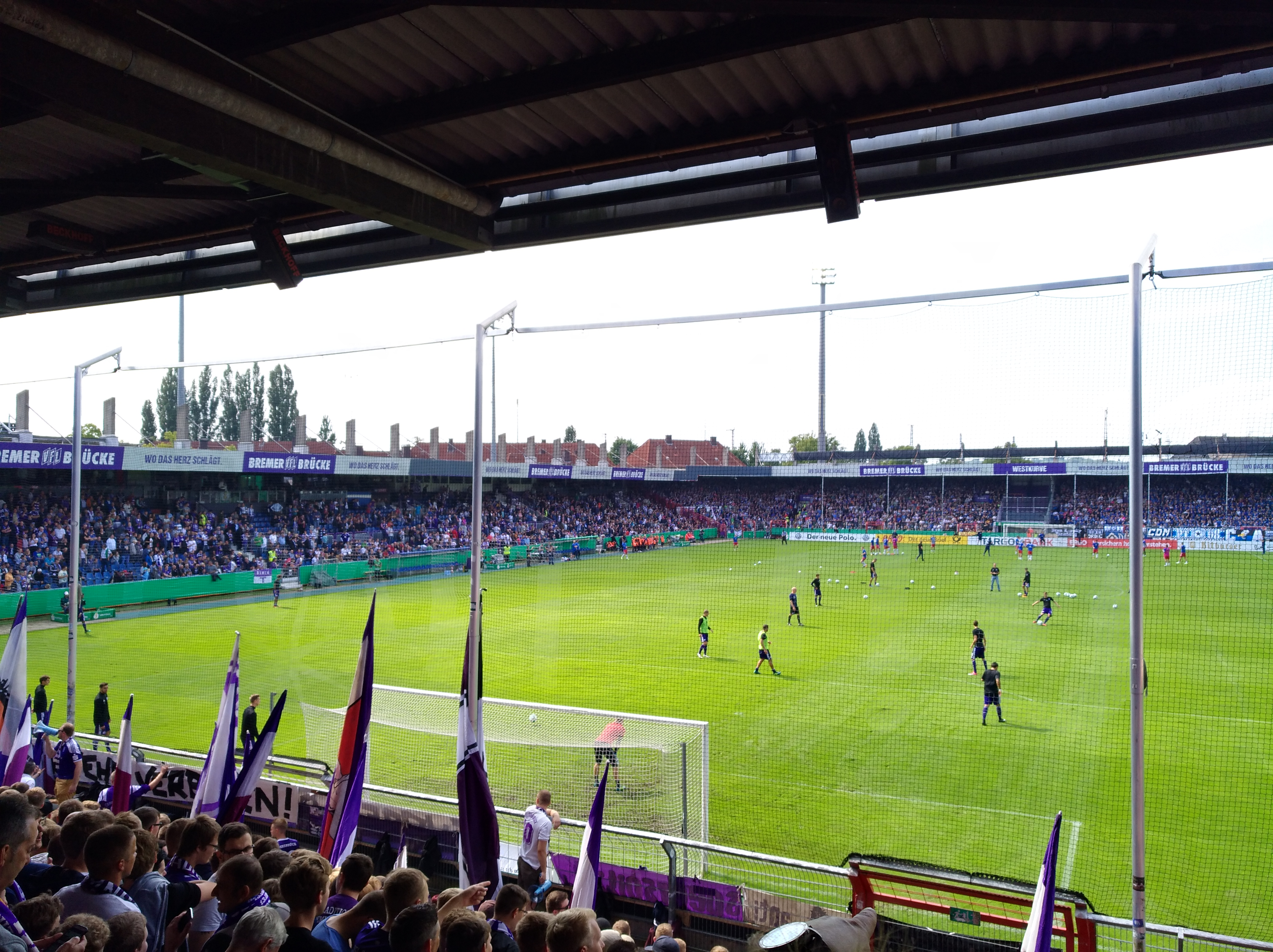
The Bremer Brücke during a DFB-Pokal win over Hamburger SV in 2017

The club plays at the Stadion an der Bremer Brücke, commonly known simply as the Bremer Brücke. The stadium has also gone by the names, "Kampfbahn Bremer Brücke", "Piepenbrock-Stadion an der Bremer Brücke", and "Osnatel-Arena". It returned to the traditional name in 2017.

The stadium was built in 1931 by Rapid Osnabrück, who emerged from VfL and reunited in 1938. It has been the home ground of VfL Osnabrück ever since. It once had a capacity of over 30,000, but now holds just over 16,000.

In recent years, the possibility of the club moving to a new stadium has been suggested due to the limitations of the current ground. The stadium remains very popular with fans and was voted the most atmospheric stadium in the 3. Liga in an online poll.

== Fans and club identity ==
The club colours are purple and white, and the team is often referred to as die Lila-Weißen (the purple and whites). Home kits are usually primarily purple.

When the club celebrated its 120th anniversary in 2019, they wore a one-off black kit, inspired by the club's original colours. In the 2019–20 season, the home shirt was purple and black, combining the original colours with the normal purple.

The club has made statements against racism, wearing a special kit in 2018 with a message against the far right, and a special kit in 2022 with the message "Build Bridges!".

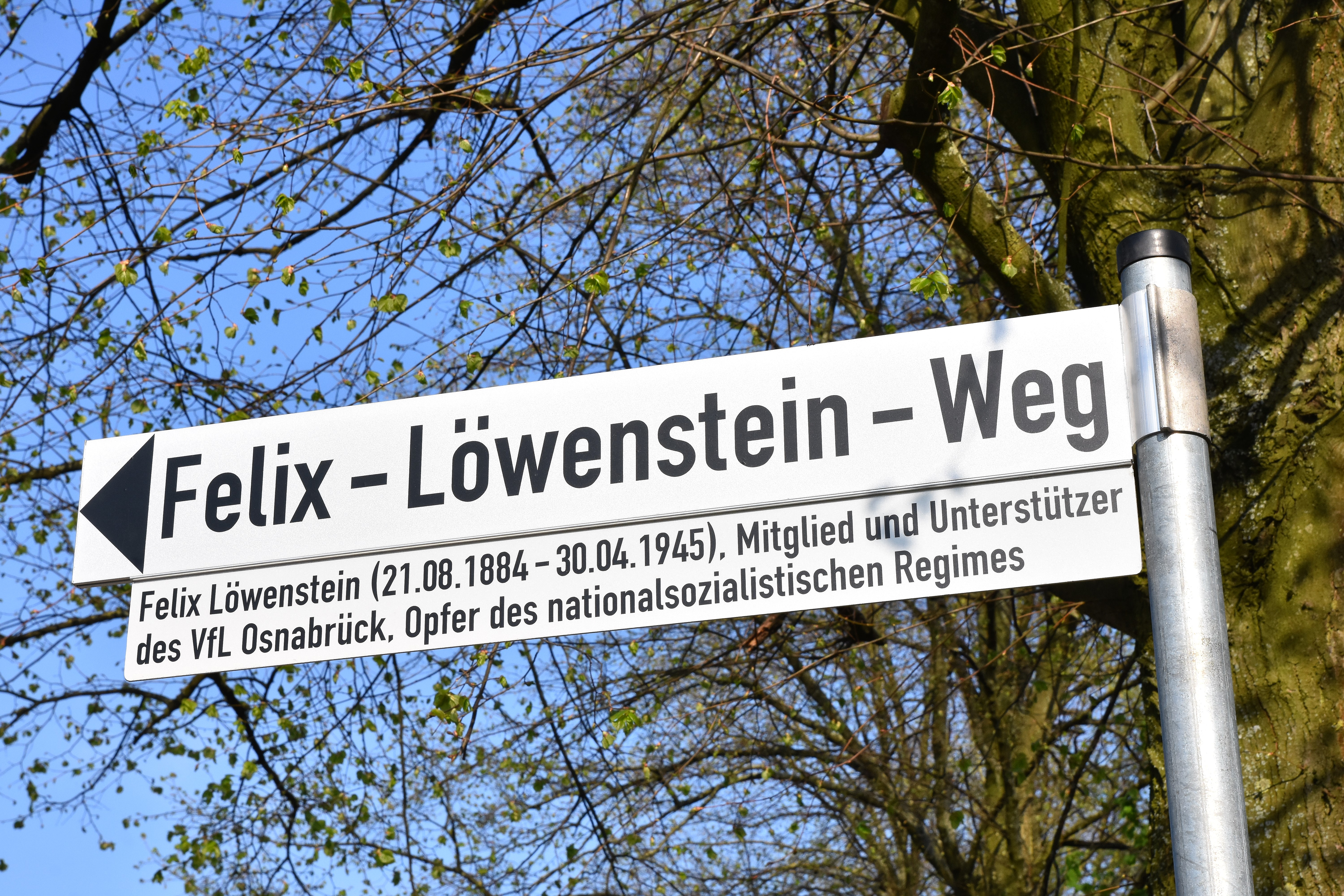
The Felix-Löwenstein-Weg

The "VfL Bündnis" alliance between the VfL Museum, Fanprojekt Osnabrück, the Violet Crew ultra group, and the club's fan department was recognised by the DFB in 2019 and awarded the Julius Hirsch Prize for their work in memory of Felix Löwenstein, a Jewish member and supporter of the club who was a victim of the Nazi regime killed in the Sandbostel camp in 1945. The VfL Museum had also advocated for a road next to the stadium to be renamed to the Felix-Löwenstein-Weg, which was done as part of the club's 120th anniversary.

Their main rivals are SC Preußen Münster.

== Managerial history ==
- (Germany) Emil Iszo (1963)
- (Germany) Walter Komorowski (1963–1964)
- (Germany) Karl-Heinz Marotzke (1964–1966)
- (Socialist Federal Republic of Yugoslavia) Radoslav Momirski (1968–1970)
- (Germany) Fritz Langner (1970–1971)
- (Germany) Erwin Türk (1971–1973)
- (Germany) Klaus-Dieter Ochs (1974–1975)
- (Germany) Reinhold Ertel (1975–1976)
- (Germany) Siegfried Melzig (1976–1977)
- (Germany) Eduard Sausmikat (1977)
- (Germany) Reinhard Roder (1977–1978)
- (Socialist Federal Republic of Yugoslavia) Radoslav Momirski (1978–1979)
- (Germany) Helmut Kalthoff (1979)
- (Germany) Gerd Bohnsack (1979–1980)
- (Germany) Werner Biskup (1980–1981)
- (Germany) Bernd Hoss (1981)
- (Germany) Carl-Heinz Rühl (1981–1984)
- (Germany) Rolf Grünther (1985–1988)
- (Socialist Federal Republic of Yugoslavia) Antun Rudinski (1988–1989)
- (Germany) Rolf Schafstall (1989–1990)
- (Germany) Roland Koch (1990)
- (Germany) Rolf Grünther (1990–1991)
- (Germany) Ulrich Sude (1991–1992)
- (Germany) Hubert Hüring (1992–1993)
- (Germany) Werner Biskup (1993–1994)
- (Germany) Heiko Flottmann (1994–1995)
- (Germany) Herbert Mühlenberg (1995–1997)
- (Germany) Hans-Werner Moors (1997–1998)
- (Germany) Gerd-Volker Schock (1998–1999)
- (Germany) Wolfgang Sidka (1999–2000)
- (Germany) Michael Lorkowski (2000)
- (Germany) Lothar Gans (2000)
- (Germany) Jürgen Gelsdorf (2000–2003)
- (Germany) Frank Pagelsdorf (2003–2004)
- (Germany) Thorsten Haas (2004)
- (Germany) Claus-Dieter Wollitz (2004–2009)
- (Germany) Karsten Baumann (2009–2011)
- (United States) Joe Enochs (2011)
- (Germany) Heiko Flottmann (2011)
- (Germany) Uwe Fuchs (2011)
- (Germany) Claus-Dieter Wollitz (2012–2013)
- (Germany) Alexander Ukrow (2013)
- (Germany) Maik Walpurgis (2013–2015)
- (United States) Joe Enochs (2015–2017)
- (Germany) Daniel Thioune (2017–2020)
- (Germany) Marco Grote (2020–2021)
- (Germany) Florian Fulland (2021) (interim)
- (Germany) Markus Feldhoff (2021)
- (Germany) Daniel Scherning (2021–2022)
- (Germany) Tim Danneberg/ (Brazil) Danilo de Souza (2022)
- (Germany) Tobias Schweinsteiger (2022–2023)
- (Germany) Martin Heck / (Germany) Tim Danneberg (2023)
- (Germany) Uwe Koschinat (2023–2024)
- (Germany) Pit Reimers (2024)
- (Germany) Marco Antwerpen (2024–2025)
- (Germany) Timo Schultz (2025–)

== Recent seasons ==
The recent season-by-season performance of the club:

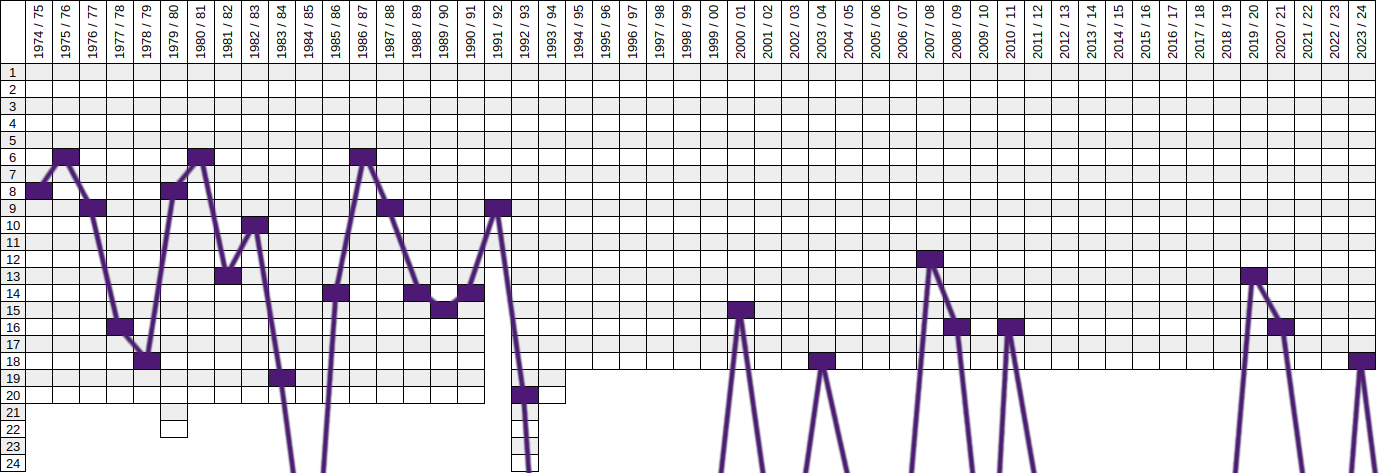
2. Bundesliga

Year	Division	Tier	Position
1999–2000	Regionalliga Nord	III	1st ↑
2000–01	2. Bundesliga	II	15th ↓
2001–02	Regionalliga Nord	III	7th
2002–03	Regionalliga Nord	III	2nd ↑
2003–04	2. Bundesliga	II	18th ↓
2004–05	Regionalliga Nord	III	4th
2005–06	Regionalliga Nord	III	10th
2006–07	Regionalliga Nord	III	2nd ↑
2007–08	2. Bundesliga	II	12th
2008–09	2. Bundesliga	II	16th ↓
2009–10	3. Liga	III	1st ↑
2010–11	2. Bundesliga	II	16th ↓
2011–12	3. Liga	III	7th
2012–13	3. Liga	III	3rd
2013–14	3. Liga	III	5th
2014–15	3. Liga	III	11th
2015–16	3. Liga	III	5th
2016–17	3. Liga	III	6th
2017–18	3. Liga	III	17th
2018–19	3. Liga	III	1st ↑
2019–20	2. Bundesliga	II	13th
2020–21	2. Bundesliga	II	16th ↓
2021–22	3. Liga	III	6th
2022–23	3. Liga	III	3rd ↑
2023–24	2. Bundesliga	II	18th ↓
2024–25	3. Liga	III	14th
2025–26	3. Liga	III	1st ↑
2026–27	2. Bundesliga	II	

Key

↑ Promoted	↓ Relegated
