= 2026–27 TSV Havelse season =

TSV Havelse
2026–27 season
- President: Manfred Hörnschemeyer
- Manager: Samir Ferchichi
- Stadium: Eilenriedestadion; Heinz von Heiden Arena
- 3. Liga: 20th
- Lower Saxony Cup: Pre-season
- Top goalscorer: League: Alexander Guiddir; Kwasi Okyere Wriedt (5 each); All: Alexander Guiddir; Kwasi Okyere Wriedt (5 each)
- Highest home attendance: 1,319; Havelse v Saarbrücken
- Lowest home attendance: 505; Havelse v Großaspach
- Average home league attendance: 771
- Biggest win: Havelse 3–2 Mannheim; Havelse 3–2 Saarbrücken
- Biggest defeat: Regensburg 5–0 Havelse; Havelse 1–6 Viktoria Köln
| Home colours | Away colours | Third colours |
- All statistics correct as of 20 November 2026.

The 2026–27 TSV Havelse season is the 115th season in the football club's history and third overall and second consecutive in the 3. Liga, the third flight of German football. They were originally relegated to the Regionalliga Nord at the end of the previous season, but ended up replacing 1860 Munich, who did not receive a 3. Liga license. TSV Havelse will also participate in this season's edition of the Lower Saxony Cup. This is the second season for Havelse in the Eilenriedestadion, located in Hanover, Lower Saxony, Germany, since their home stadium, the Wilhelm-Langrehr-Stadion in Garbsen, did not meet 3. Liga standards. For high-risk matches, they will move to the Heinz von Heiden Arena, where the team played their 3. Liga matches in the 2021–22 season; they also played the first four home matches of the season there while waiting for the Eilenriedestadion to be approved for the 3. Liga.

== Players ==
=== Squad information ===
As of 3 September 2026

Note: Flags indicate national team as defined under FIFA eligibility rules; some limited exceptions apply. Players may hold more than one non-FIFA nationality.

| No. | Pos. | Nation | Player |
|---|---|---|---|
| 1 | GK | GER | Tom Opitz |
| 3 | DF | GER | Max Lamby |
| 4 | DF | GER | Semi Belkahia (captain) |
| 5 | MF | GER | Niklas Tauer |
| 6 | MF | HON | Leonardo Posadas |
| 7 | MF | GER | Marc Richter |
| 8 | MF | GER | Johann Berger |
| 9 | FW | GER | Lorenzo Paldino |
| 10 | MF | GER | Kevin Schumacher |
| 11 | FW | GHA | Kwasi Okyere Wriedt |
| 12 | MF | POL | Eryk Grzywacz (on loan from Holstein Kiel) |
| 13 | GK | ISR | Omer Hanin |
| 14 | MF | GER | Yusuf Wardak (on loan from Energie Cottbus) |
| 15 | DF | GER | Dennis Duah |
| 16 | FW | GER | Torben Engelking |
| 17 | FW | GER | Finn Kiszka |
| 19 | DF | GER | Eric Voufack (on loan from Kolding) |

| No. | Pos. | Nation | Player |
|---|---|---|---|
| 20 | FW | GER | Alexander Guiddir (on loan from Schalke 04 II) |
| 21 | DF | GER | Irichad Behrens |
| 22 | DF | GER | Leon Sommer-Deiss |
| 23 | MF | GER | Robin Müller |
| 24 | DF | GER | Yannick Mausehund (on loan from 1. FC Köln II) |
| 25 | GK | GER | Fynn Wolter |
| 27 | DF | GER | Donald Nduka |
| 28 | MF | GER | Robin Velasco |
| 29 | GK | GER | Norman Quindt |
| 30 | DF | AUT | Timo Friedrich |
| 31 | MF | GER | Jannik Oltrogge |
| 32 | MF | GER | Anton Hanke |
| 33 | MF | GER | Jesse Tugbenyo |
| 35 | MF | GHA | Joel Darko Ampem |
| 36 | MF | GER | Temilola Awoyale |
| 38 | FW | GER | Leon Švitek |
| 39 | GK | GER | Jannis Krug |

=== Transfers ===
==== In ====
| No. | Pos | Player | From | Type | Window | Ends | Fee | Source |
|---|---|---|---|---|---|---|---|---|
| 3 | DF | (Germany) Max Lamby | (Germany) Schalke 04 II | Transfer | Summer | 30 June 2027 | Free | |
| 5 | MF | (Germany) Niklas Tauer | (Germany) Mainz 05 | Transfer | Summer | 30 June 2027 | Free | |
| 6 | MF | (Honduras) Leonardo Posadas | (Germany) Hamburger SV II | Transfer | Summer | 30 June 2027 | Free | |
| 7 | MF | (Germany) Marc Richter | (Germany) Alemannia Aachen | Transfer | Summer | 30 June 2027 | Free | |
| 10 | MF | (Germany) Kevin Schumacher | (Germany) VfL Osnabrück | Transfer | Summer | 30 June 2027 | Free | |
| 11 | FW | (Ghana) Kwasi Okyere Wriedt | (Germany) Alemannia Aachen | Transfer | Summer | 30 June 2027 | Free | |
| 12 | MF | (Poland) Eryk Grzywacz | (Germany) Holstein Kiel | Loan | Summer | 30 June 2027 | Free | |
| 13 | GK | (Israel) Omer Hanin | (Germany) MSV Duisburg | Transfer | Summer | 30 June 2027 | Free | |
| 14 | MF | (Germany) Yusuf Wardak | (Germany) Energie Cottbus | Loan | Summer | 30 June 2027 | Free | |
| 15 | DF | (Germany) Dennis Duah | (Germany) Dynamo Dresden | Transfer | Summer | 30 June 2027 | Free | |
| 17 | FW | (Germany) Finn Kiszka | (Germany) HSC Hannover | Transfer | Summer | 30 June 2027 | Free | |
| 19 | DF | (Germany) Eric Voufack | (Denmark) Kolding | Loan | Summer | 30 June 2027 | Free | |
| 20 | FW | (Germany) Alexander Guiddir | (Germany) Schalke 04 II | Loan | Summer | 30 June 2027 | Free | |
| 24 | DF | (Germany) Yannick Mausehund | (Germany) 1. FC Köln II | Loan | Summer | 30 June 2027 | Free | |
| 27 | DF | (Germany) Donald Nduka | (Germany) FC Ingolstadt | Transfer | Summer | 30 June 2027 | Free | |
| 28 | MF | (Germany) Robin Velasco | (Germany) Viktoria Köln | Transfer | Summer | 30 June 2027 | Free | |
| 33 | MF | (Germany) Jesse Tugbenyo | (Germany) MSV Duisburg | Transfer | Summer | 30 June 2027 | Free | |

==== Out ====
| No. | Pos | Player | To | Type | Window | Fee | Source |
|---|---|---|---|---|---|---|---|
| 3 | DF | (Germany) Marco Schleef | (Germany) Arminia Hannover | End of contract | Summer | – | |
| 4 | DF | (Kosovo) Besfort Kolgeci | (Germany) STK Eilvese | End of contract | Summer | – | |
| 5 | DF | (Germany) Dominic Minz | TBD | End of contract | Summer | – | |
| 7 | DF | (Turkey) Emre Aytun | TBD | End of contract | Summer | – | |
| 10 | FW | (Germany) Julius Düker | (Germany) SC Freiburg II | End of contract | Summer | – | |
| 11 | FW | (Germany) Yannik Jaeschke | (Germany) SVV Hülsen | End of contract | Summer | – | |
| 28 | FW | (Wales) Noah Williams | (Wales) Pure Swansea F.C. | End of contract | Summer | - | |
| 14 | FW | (Germany) Marko Ilic | (Australia) Brisbane Roar | End of contract | Summer | – | |
| 15 | DF | (Germany) Dennis Duah | (Germany) Dynamo Dresden | End of loan | Summer | – | |
| 19 | MF | (Morocco) Nassim Boujellab | (Germany) Jahn Regensburg | End of contract | Summer | – | |
| 20 | FW | (Germany) Christopher Schepp | (Germany) SV Drochtersen/Assel | Transfer | Summer | Free | |
| 24 | MF | (Germany) Noah Plume | (Germany) STK Eilvese | End of contract | Summer | – | |
| 27 | MF | (Germany) Tom Berger | (Germany) SV Babelsberg | Transfer | Summer | Free | |
| 28 | MF | (Germany) Julian Rufidis | TBD | End of contract | Summer | – | |
| 33 | MF | (Albania) Arlind Rexhepi | (Germany) Waldhof Mannheim | End of loan | Summer | – | |
| 35 | GK | (Germany) Alexander Dlugaiczyk | Retirement | End of career | Summer | – | |
| 37 | FW | (Germany) Hasan Özdemir | (Germany) Germania Egestorf/Langreder | Transfer | Summer | Free | |
| 39 | MF | (Germany) Florian Riedel | Retirement | End of career | Summer | – | |
| 40 | GK | (Germany) Jonah Busse | (Germany) Preußen Münster II | End of contract | Summer | – | |
| 43 | FW | (Austria) Manuel Polster | (Austria) ASK Voitsberg | End of contract | Summer | – | |

== Friendly matches ==
Win Draw Loss

| 11 July 2026 Friendly | Atlas Delmenhorst (Germany) | 2–3 | (Germany) TSV Havelse | Delmenhorst |
| 15:00 CEST (UTC+2) | 14'; 60' | Report | Wriedt 30'; Müller 46'; Sommer 62' | Stadium: Städtisches Stadion an der Düsternortstraße |

| 14 July 2026 Friendly | Eintracht Braunschweig (Germany) | 2–1 | (Germany) TSV Havelse | Wolfenbüttel |
| 18:00 CEST (UTC+2) | Sturm 16'; Urbich 61' | Report | Schumacher 37' | Stadium: Sportpark Meesche |

| 18 July 2026 Friendly | 1. FC Magdeburg II (Germany) | 2–2 | (Germany) TSV Havelse | Magdeburg |
| 12:00 CEST (UTC+2) | Tauer; Awoyale | Report | (pen.) |

| 19 July 2026 Friendly | Eintracht Norderstedt (Germany) | 1–1 | (Germany) TSV Havelse | Norderstedt |
| 16:00 CEST (UTC+2) | Behounek 33' | Report | Tauer 52' | Stadium: Edmund-Plambeck-Stadion |

| 25 July 2026 Friendly | Hannover 96 II (Germany) | 3–1 | (Germany) TSV Havelse | Hanover |
| 14:00 CEST (UTC+2) | Ayçiçek 49' (pen.); Marques 78'; Rüdiger 83' | Report | Wriedt 70' | Stadium: Eilenriedestadion |

| 26 July 2026 Friendly | SC Hemmingen-Westerfeld (Germany) | 4–5 | (Germany) TSV Havelse | Sarstedt |
| | Aslan; Biehl; Fender | Report | Kiszka; Guiddir; Švitek; Müller; Winter | Stadium: Jahnsportpark; Attendance: 250 |

| 31 July 2026 Friendly | TSV Havelse (Germany) | 0–0 | (Germany) Barockstadt Fulda-Lehnerz | Garbsen |
| 21:20 CEST (UTC+2) | | Report | | Stadium: Wilhelm-Langrehr-Stadion; Attendance: 50 |

| 22 August 2026 Friendly | Hannover 96 II (Germany) | 0–4 | (Germany) TSV Havelse | Hanover |
| | | Report | Guiddir 30'; Švitek 70', 85'; Voufack 73' | Stadium: Eilenriedestadion; Attendance: 0 |

| 1 October 2026 Friendly | VfL Wolfsburg (Germany) | 4–1 | (Germany) TSV Havelse | Wolfsburg |
| 16:00 CEST (UTC+2) | Reese 4'; Damar 14', 34', 88' | Report | Velasco 76' | Stadium: Trainingsgelände am VfL-Center |

| 12 November 2026 Friendly | Hannover 96 (Germany) | 6–1 | (Germany) TSV Havelse | Hanover |
| 12:00 CET (UTC+1) | Hobrecht 19', 29', 45'; Roggow 45+3'; Ahlberg 63'; Oudenne 87' | Report | Müller 55' | Stadium: Eilenriedestadion; Attendance: 550; Referee: Björn Behrens |

== Competitions ==
Win Draw Loss

=== Overview ===
| Competition | First match | Last match | Starting round | Record | | | | | | | |
| Competition | First match | Last match | Starting round | Pld | W | D | L | GF | GA | GD | Win % |
|---|---|---|---|---|---|---|---|---|---|---|---|
| 3. Liga | 8 August 2026 | 22 May 2027 | Matchday 1 | 14 | 2 | 4 | 8 | 18 | 35 | −17 | 14.29 |
| Lower Saxony Cup | 2 December 2026 | | Quarter-finals | 0 | 0 | 0 | 0 | 0 | 0 | +0 | — |
| Total | | | | 14 | 2 | 4 | 8 | 18 | 35 | −17 | 14.29 |

Last updated: 20 November 2026
Source: Competitions

=== 3. Liga ===
==== League table ====
| Pos | Team | Pld | W | D | L | GF | GA | GD | Pts | Promotion, qualification or relegation |
|---|---|---|---|---|---|---|---|---|---|---|
| 16 | Würzburger Kickers | 14 | 4 | 2 | 8 | 18 | 27 | −9 | 14 | |
| 17 | Fortuna Köln | 14 | 3 | 4 | 7 | 12 | 17 | −5 | 13 | Relegation to Regionalliga |
| 18 | SC Verl | 14 | 3 | 3 | 8 | 17 | 30 | −13 | 12 | Relegation to Regionalliga |
| 19 | Sonnenhof Großaspach | 14 | 3 | 3 | 8 | 14 | 32 | −18 | 12 | Relegation to Regionalliga |
| 20 | TSV Havelse | 14 | 2 | 4 | 8 | 18 | 35 | −17 | 10 | Relegation to Regionalliga |

Updated to match(es) played on 21 November 2026. Source: DFB
Rules for classification: 1) Points; 2) Goal difference; 3) Goals scored; 4) Head-to-head results; 5) Head-to-head away goals scored; 6) Away goals scored; 7) Play-off.

==== Results summary ====
| Overall | | | | | | | | Home | | | | | | Away | | | | | |
| Pld | W | D | L | GF | GA | GD | Pts | W | D | L | GF | GA | GD | W | D | L | GF | GA | GD |
|---|---|---|---|---|---|---|---|---|---|---|---|---|---|---|---|---|---|---|---|
| 14 | 2 | 4 | 8 | 18 | 35 | −17 | 10 | 2 | 3 | 3 | 15 | 21 | −6 | 0 | 1 | 5 | 3 | 14 | −11 |

Last updated: 20 November 2026.
Source: DFB

==== Results by round ====
| Round | 1 | 2 | 3 | 4 | 5 | 6 | 7 | 8 | 9 | 10 | 11 | 12 | 13 | 14 | 15 | 16 | 17 | 18 | 19 | 20 | 21 | 22 | 23 | 24 | 25 | 26 | 27 | 28 | 29 | 30 | 31 | 32 | 33 | 34 | 35 | 36 | 37 | 38 |
|---|---|---|---|---|---|---|---|---|---|---|---|---|---|---|---|---|---|---|---|---|---|---|---|---|---|---|---|---|---|---|---|---|---|---|---|---|---|---|
| Ground | H | A | H | A | H | A | H | A | H | A | H | H | A | H | A | A | H | A | H | A | H | A | H | A | H | A | H | A | H | A | A | H | A | H | H | A | H | A |
| Result | L | L | W | L | D | L | L | L | D | D | W | D | L | L | | | | | | | | | | | | | | | | | | | | | | | | |
| Position | 12 | 17 | 14 | 17 | 17 | 19 | 20 | 20 | 20 | 20 | 20 | 20 | 20 | 20 | | | | | | | | | | | | | | | | | | | | | | | | |

Updated to match(es) played on 20 November 2026. Source: DFB
A = Away; H = Home; W = Win; D = Draw; L = Loss

==== Matches ====
| 8 August 2026 1 | TSV Havelse | 2–3 | VfB Stuttgart II | Hanover |
| 14:00 CEST (UTC+2) | Tauer 1'; Tugbenyo 49' | Report | Groiß 42'; van der Leij 70'; Malanga 78' | Stadium: Heinz von Heiden Arena; Attendance: 750; Referee: Ben Henry Uhrig |

| 15 August 2026 2 | Rot-Weiss Essen | 1–0 | TSV Havelse | Essen |
| 14:00 CEST (UTC+2) | Telalović 64' (pen.) | Report | | Stadium: Stadion an der Hafenstraße; Attendance: 16,547; Referee: Michael Näther |

| 30 August 2026 3 | TSV Havelse | 3–2 | Waldhof Mannheim | Hanover |
| 16:30 CEST (UTC+2) | Guiddir 25'; Wriedt 57'; Sommer-Deiss 84' | Report | Gregório 21'; Thill 23' | Stadium: Heinz von Heiden Arena; Attendance: 1,018; Referee: Koji Takasaki |

| 5 September 2026 4 | Preußen Münster | 2–1 | TSV Havelse | Münster |
| 14:00 CEST (UTC+2) | Tikvić 9'; Zeller 87' | Report | Guiddir 35' | Stadium: LVM-Preußenstadion; Attendance: 12,114; Referee: Martin Wilke |

| 12 September 2026 5 | TSV Havelse | 2–2 | Sonnenhof Großaspach | Hanover |
| 14:00 CEST (UTC+2) | Guiddir 6', 88' | Report | Lo. Maier 32'; Çeliktaş 45+1' | Stadium: Heinz von Heiden Arena; Attendance: 505; Referee: Yannick Sager |

| 15 September 2026 6 | MSV Duisburg | 2–1 | TSV Havelse | Duisburg |
| 19:00 CEST (UTC+2) | Sussek 79'; Duah 90+4' (o.g.) | Report | Nduka 39' | Stadium: Schauinsland-Reisen-Arena; Attendance: 17,709; Referee: Davina Lutz |

| 25 September 2026 7 | TSV Havelse | 1–3 | Fortuna Köln | Hanover |
| 19:00 CEST (UTC+2) | Wriedt 67' | Report | Bröger 39'; Mause 83'; Wirtz 90+2' | Stadium: Heinz von Heiden Arena; Attendance: 907; Referee: Franziska Wildfeuer |

| 10 October 2026 8 | Jahn Regensburg | 5–0 | TSV Havelse | Regensburg |
| 14:00 CEST (UTC+2) | Boujellab 44', 45+1', 76'; Fein 52' (pen.); Hobsch 88' | Report | | Stadium: Jahnstadion Regensburg; Attendance: 6,539; Referee: Henry Schröder |

| 13 October 2026 9 | TSV Havelse | 2–2 | Würzburger Kickers | Hanover |
| 19:00 CEST (UTC+2) | Wriedt 25', 35' | Report | Bonga 70' (pen.); Nischalke 90+2' (pen.) | Stadium: Eilenriedestadion; Attendance: 616; Referee: Luca Sambill |

| 18 October 2026 10 | SV Meppen | 1–1 | TSV Havelse | Meppen |
| 19:30 CEST (UTC+2) | Deters 15' | Report | Schumacher 13' | Stadium: Hänsch-Arena; Attendance: 7,629; Referee: Ben Henry Uhrig |

| 25 October 2026 11 | TSV Havelse | 3–2 | 1. FC Saarbrücken | Hanover |
| 13:30 CET (UTC+1) | Berger 37' (pen.), 48' (pen.); Voufack 88' | Report | Staff 14'; Brünker 90+1' | Stadium: Eilenriedestadion; Attendance: 1,319; Referee: Maximilian Lotz |

| 31 October 2026 12 | TSV Havelse | 1–1 | FC Ingolstadt | Hanover |
| 14:00 CET (UTC+1) | Wriedt 6' | Report | Ugondu 12' | Stadium: Eilenriedestadion; Attendance: 543; Referee: Michael Näther |

| 7 November 2026 13 | Wehen Wiesbaden | 3–0 | TSV Havelse | Wiesbaden |
| 14:00 CET (UTC+1) | Janitzek 10'; Massimo 47'; Gözüsirin 81' | Report | | Stadium: BRITA-Arena; Attendance: 2,981; Referee: Jonah Besong |

| 20 November 2026 14 | TSV Havelse | 1–6 | Viktoria Köln | Hanover |
| 19:00 CET (UTC+1) | Guiddir 56' | Report | Castelle 21'; Otto 27' (pen.), 57', 61'; Amann 49'; Fallmann 67' | Stadium: Eilenriedestadion; Attendance: 512; Referee: Max Kluge |

| 27 November 2026 15 | Hansa Rostock | v | TSV Havelse | Rostock |
| 19:00 CET (UTC+1) | | | | Stadium: Ostseestadion |

| 4–6 December 2026 16 | Alemannia Aachen | v | TSV Havelse | Aachen |
| | | | | Stadium: Tivoli |

| 11–13 December 2026 17 | TSV Havelse | v | TSG Hoffenheim II | Hanover |
| | | | | Stadium: Eilenriedestadion |

| 18–20 December 2026 18 | SC Verl | v | TSV Havelse | Verl |
| | | | | Stadium: Sportclub Arena |

| 15–17 January 2027 19 | TSV Havelse | v | Fortuna Düsseldorf | Hanover |
| | | | | Stadium: Eilenriedestadion |

| 22–24 January 2027 20 | VfB Stuttgart II | v | TSV Havelse | Aspach |
| | | | | Stadium: WIRmachenDRUCK Arena |

| 29–31 January 2027 21 | TSV Havelse | v | Rot-Weiss Essen | Hanover |
| | | | | Stadium: Eilenriedestadion |

| 5–7 February 2027 22 | Waldhof Mannheim | v | TSV Havelse | Mannheim |
| | | | | Stadium: Carl-Benz-Stadion |

| 12–14 February 2027 23 | TSV Havelse | v | Preußen Münster | Hanover |
| | | | | Stadium: Eilenriedestadion |

| 19–21 February 2027 24 | Sonnenhof Großaspach | v | TSV Havelse | Aspach |
| | | | | Stadium: WIRmachenDRUCK Arena |

| 26–28 February 2027 25 | TSV Havelse | v | MSV Duisburg | Hanover |
| | | | | Stadium: Eilenriedestadion |

| 2–3 March 2027 26 | Fortuna Köln | v | TSV Havelse | Cologne |
| 19:00 CET (UTC+1) | | | | Stadium: Südstadion |

| 5–7 March 2027 27 | TSV Havelse | v | Jahn Regensburg | Hanover |
| | | | | Stadium: Eilenriedestadion |

| 12–14 March 2027 28 | Würzburger Kickers | v | TSV Havelse | Würzburg |
| | | | | Stadium: Akon Arena |

| 16–17 March 2027 29 | TSV Havelse | v | SV Meppen | Hanover |
| 19:00 CET (UTC+1) | | | | Stadium: Eilenriedestadion |

| 19–21 March 2027 30 | 1. FC Saarbrücken | v | TSV Havelse | Saarbrücken |
| | | | | Stadium: Ludwigsparkstadion |

| 2–4 April 2027 31 | FC Ingolstadt | v | TSV Havelse | Ingolstadt |
| | | | | Stadium: Audi Sportpark |

| 9–11 April 2026 32 | TSV Havelse | v | Wehen Wiesbaden | Hanover |
| | | | | Stadium: Eilenriedestadion |

| 16–18 April 2027 33 | Viktoria Köln | v | TSV Havelse | Cologne |
| | | | | Stadium: Sportpark Höhenberg |

| 23–25 April 2027 34 | TSV Havelse | v | Hansa Rostock | Hanover |
| | | | | Stadium: Heinz von Heiden Arena |

| 27–28 April 2027 35 | TSV Havelse | v | Alemannia Aachen | Hanover |
| 19:00 CEST (UTC+2) | | | | Stadium: Eilenriedestadion |

| 7–9 May 2027 36 | TSG Hoffenheim II | v | TSV Havelse | Sinsheim |
| | | | | Stadium: Dietmar-Hopp-Stadion |

| 14–16 May 2027 37 | TSV Havelse | v | SC Verl | Hanover |
| | | | | Stadium: Eilenriedestadion |

| 22 May 2027 38 | Fortuna Düsseldorf | v | TSV Havelse | Düsseldorf |
| 14:00 CEST (UTC+2) | | | | Stadium: Merkur Spiel-Arena |

=== Lower Saxony Cup ===
| 2 December 2026 Quarter-finals | VfB Oldenburg | v | TSV Havelse | Oldenburg |
| 18:30 CET (UTC+1) | | | | Stadium: Marschweg-Stadion |

== Statistics ==
=== Appearances and goals ===
As of 20 November 2026

| No. | Pos | Player | 3. Liga | | Lower Saxony Cup | | Total | |
| No. | Pos | Player | Apps | Goals | Apps | Goals | Apps | Goals |
|---|---|---|---|---|---|---|---|---|
| 1 | GK | (Germany) Tom Opitz | 7+1 | 0 | 0 | 0 | 8 | 0 |
| 3 | DF | (Germany) Max Lamby | 4+4 | 0 | 0 | 0 | 8 | 0 |
| 4 | DF | (Germany) Semi Belkahia | 13 | 0 | 0 | 0 | 13 | 0 |
| 5 | MF | (Germany) Niklas Tauer | 2+3 | 1 | 0 | 0 | 5 | 1 |
| 6 | MF | (Honduras) Leonardo Posadas | 0 | 0 | 0 | 0 | 0 | 0 |
| 7 | MF | (Germany) Marc Richter | 1+3 | 0 | 0 | 0 | 4 | 0 |
| 8 | MF | (Germany) Johann Berger | 13 | 2 | 0 | 0 | 13 | 2 |
| 9 | FW | (Germany) Lorenzo Paldino | 2+8 | 0 | 0 | 0 | 10 | 0 |
| 10 | MF | (Germany) Kevin Schumacher | 13 | 1 | 0 | 0 | 13 | 1 |
| 11 | FW | (Ghana) Kwasi Okyere Wriedt | 11+2 | 5 | 0 | 0 | 13 | 5 |
| 12 | MF | (Poland) Eryk Grzywacz | 7+1 | 0 | 0 | 0 | 8 | 0 |
| 13 | GK | (Israel) Omer Hanin | 7 | 0 | 0 | 0 | 7 | 0 |
| 14 | MF | (Germany) Yusuf Wardak | 5+2 | 0 | 0 | 0 | 7 | 0 |
| 15 | DF | (Germany) Dennis Duah | 14 | 0 | 0 | 0 | 14 | 0 |
| 16 | FW | (Germany) Torben Engelking | 0 | 0 | 0 | 0 | 0 | 0 |
| 17 | FW | (Germany) Finn Kiszka | 0+1 | 0 | 0 | 0 | 1 | 0 |
| 19 | DF | (Germany) Eric Voufack | 8+4 | 1 | 0 | 0 | 12 | 1 |
| 20 | FW | (Germany) Alexander Guiddir | 7+6 | 5 | 0 | 0 | 13 | 5 |
| 21 | DF | (Germany) Irichad Behrens | 0 | 0 | 0 | 0 | 0 | 0 |
| 22 | DF | (Germany) Leon Sommer-Deiss | 10+1 | 1 | 0 | 0 | 11 | 1 |
| 23 | MF | (Germany) Robin Müller | 1+3 | 0 | 0 | 0 | 4 | 0 |
| 24 | DF | (Germany) Yannick Mausehund | 6 | 0 | 0 | 0 | 6 | 0 |
| 25 | GK | (Germany) Fynn Wolter | 0 | 0 | 0 | 0 | 0 | 0 |
| 27 | DF | (Germany) Donald Nduka | 5+2 | 1 | 0 | 0 | 7 | 1 |
| 28 | MF | (Germany) Robin Velasco | 5+6 | 0 | 0 | 0 | 11 | 0 |
| 29 | GK | (Germany) Norman Quindt | 0 | 0 | 0 | 0 | 0 | 0 |
| 30 | DF | (Austria) Timo Friedrich | 0 | 0 | 0 | 0 | 0 | 0 |
| 31 | MF | (Germany) Jannik Oltrogge | 0+4 | 0 | 0 | 0 | 4 | 0 |
| 32 | MF | (Germany) Anton Hanke | 0 | 0 | 0 | 0 | 0 | 0 |
| 33 | MF | (Germany) Jesse Tugbenyo | 13+1 | 1 | 0 | 0 | 14 | 1 |
| 34 | FW | (Kosovo) Ermal Krasniqi | 0 | 0 | 0 | 0 | 0 | 0 |
| 35 | MF | (Ghana) Joel Darko Ampem | 0 | 0 | 0 | 0 | 0 | 0 |
| 36 | MF | (Germany) Temilola Awoyale | 0+1 | 0 | 0 | 0 | 1 | 0 |
| 38 | FW | (Germany) Leon Švitek | 0+1 | 0 | 0 | 0 | 1 | 0 |
| 39 | GK | (Germany) Jannis Krug | 0 | 0 | 0 | 0 | 0 | 0 |

=== Goalscorers ===
As of 20 November 2026

| Rank | No. | Pos | Name | 3. Liga | Lower Saxony Cup | Total |
|---|---|---|---|---|---|---|
| 1 | 11 | FW | (Ghana) Kwasi Okyere Wriedt | 5 | 0 | 5 |
| 1 | 20 | FW | (Germany) Alexander Guiddir | 5 | 0 | 5 |
| 3 | 8 | MF | (Germany) Johann Berger | 2 | 0 | 2 |
| 4 | 5 | MF | (Germany) Niklas Tauer | 1 | 0 | 1 |
| 4 | 10 | MF | (Germany) Kevin Schumacher | 1 | 0 | 1 |
| 4 | 19 | DF | (Germany) Eric Voufack | 1 | 0 | 1 |
| 4 | 22 | DF | (Germany) Leon Sommer-Deiss | 1 | 0 | 1 |
| 4 | 27 | DF | (Germany) Donald Nduka | 1 | 0 | 1 |
| 4 | 33 | MF | (Germany) Jesse Tugbenyo | 1 | 0 | 1 |
| Total | | | | 18 | 0 | 18 |

=== Clean sheets ===
As of 20 November 2026

| Rank | No. | Pos | Name | 3. Liga | Lower Saxony Cup | Total |
| Total | | | | 0 | 0 | 0 |

=== Disciplinary record ===
As of 20 November 2026

| Rank | No. | Pos | Name | 3. Liga | | | Lower Saxony Cup | | | Total | | |
| Rank | No. | Pos | Name | Yellow card | (yellow card) (yellow-red card) | Red card | Yellow card | (yellow card) (yellow-red card) | Red card | Yellow card | (yellow card) (yellow-red card) | Red card |
|---|---|---|---|---|---|---|---|---|---|---|---|---|
| 1 | 24 | DF | (Germany) Yannick Mausehund | 2 | 1 | 0 | 0 | 0 | 0 | 2 | 1 | 0 |
| 1 | 27 | DF | (Germany) Donald Nduka | 0 | 0 | 1 | 0 | 0 | 0 | 0 | 0 | 1 |
| 3 | 8 | MF | (Germany) Johann Berger | 4 | 0 | 0 | 0 | 0 | 0 | 4 | 0 | 0 |
| 3 | 15 | DF | (Germany) Dennis Duah | 4 | 0 | 0 | 0 | 0 | 0 | 4 | 0 | 0 |
| 3 | 33 | MF | (Germany) Jesse Tugbenyo | 4 | 0 | 0 | 0 | 0 | 0 | 4 | 0 | 0 |
| 6 | 4 | DF | (Germany) Semi Belkahia | 3 | 0 | 0 | 0 | 0 | 0 | 3 | 0 | 0 |
| 6 | 10 | MF | (Germany) Kevin Schumacher | 3 | 0 | 0 | 0 | 0 | 0 | 3 | 0 | 0 |
| 6 | 11 | FW | (Ghana) Kwasi Okyere Wriedt | 3 | 0 | 0 | 0 | 0 | 0 | 3 | 0 | 0 |
| 9 | 12 | MF | (Poland) Eryk Grzywacz | 2 | 0 | 0 | 0 | 0 | 0 | 2 | 0 | 0 |
| 9 | 19 | DF | (Germany) Eric Voufack | 2 | 0 | 0 | 0 | 0 | 0 | 2 | 0 | 0 |
| 9 | 20 | FW | (Germany) Alexander Guiddir | 2 | 0 | 0 | 0 | 0 | 0 | 2 | 0 | 0 |
| 12 | 3 | DF | (Germany) Max Lamby | 1 | 0 | 0 | 0 | 0 | 0 | 1 | 0 | 0 |
| 12 | 9 | FW | (Germany) Lorenzo Paldino | 1 | 0 | 0 | 0 | 0 | 0 | 1 | 0 | 0 |
| 12 | 14 | MF | (Germany) Yusuf Wardak | 1 | 0 | 0 | 0 | 0 | 0 | 1 | 0 | 0 |
| 12 | 22 | DF | (Germany) Leon Sommer-Deiss | 1 | 0 | 0 | 0 | 0 | 0 | 1 | 0 | 0 |
| 12 | 28 | MF | (Germany) Robin Velasco | 1 | 0 | 0 | 0 | 0 | 0 | 1 | 0 | 0 |
| Total | | | | 34 | 1 | 1 | 0 | 0 | 0 | 34 | 1 | 1 |
