= Honduras national football team =

Men's association football team

Honduras
- Nickname(s): Los Catrachos (The Catrachos); La Bicolor (The Bicolor); La H (The H)
- Association: Federación de Fútbol de Honduras (FFH)
- Confederation: CONCACAF (North America)
- Sub-confederation: UNCAF (Central America)
- Head coach: José Francisco Molina
- Captain: Denil Maldonado
- Most caps: Maynor Figueroa (181)
- Top scorer: Carlos Pavón (57)
- Home stadium: Estadio Nacional Chelato Uclés
- FIFA code: HON
First colours	Second colours	Third colours

FIFA ranking
- Current: 68 ▼1 (18 November 2026)
- Highest: 20 (2001)
- Lowest: 101 (December 2015)

First international
- Guatemala 9–0 Honduras (Guatemala City, Guatemala; 14 September 1921)

Biggest win
- Honduras 10–0 Nicaragua (San José, Costa Rica; 13 March 1946)

Biggest defeat
- Guatemala 9–0 Honduras (Guatemala City, Guatemala; 14 September 1921)

World Cup
- Appearances: 3 (first in 1982)
- Best result: Group stage (1982, 2010, 2014)

CONCACAF Championship / Gold Cup
- Appearances: 23 (first in 1963)
- Best result: Champions (1981)

CONCACAF Nations League
- Appearances: 4 (first in 2019–20)
- Best result: Third place (2021)

Copa América
- Appearances: 1 (first in 2001)
- Best result: Third place (2001)

CCCF Championship
- Appearances: 6 (first in 1946)
- Best result: Runners-up (1953)

The Honduras national football team (Spanish: Selección de fútbol de Honduras) represents Honduras in men's international football, and is governed by the Football Federation of Honduras (Spanish: Federación de Fútbol de Honduras), the governing body for football in Honduras founded in 1935. It has been a full member of FIFA since 1946, is a founding member of CONCACAF which was founded in 1961, and is also a member of UNCAF in the Central American Zone. From 1938 to 1961, the team was a member of CCCF, the former governing body of football in Central America and Caribbean and a predecessor confederation of CONCACAF. Honduras was also a member of PFC, the former unified confederation of the Americas.

Honduras has qualified for the FIFA World Cup three times (1982, 2010 and 2014). Honduras has participated twenty-three times in CONCACAF's premier continental competition, it is one of three Central American teams to have won the competition, winning as hosts the CONCACAF Championship in 1981. The team's best performance under the CONCACAF Gold Cup format was finishing as runners-up in 1991. It has participated five times in League A of the CONCACAF Nations League, finishing as third place in the 2021 Finals.

Honduras has participated once in the Copa América, finishing as third place in 2001. In subcontinental competitions, the team won 4 Copa Centroamericana titles and also finished as runners-up in the 1953 CCCF Championship.

== History ==
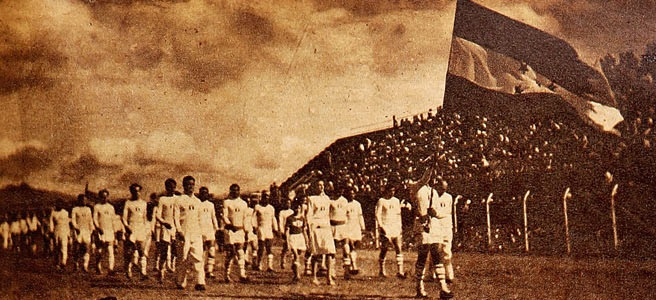
The Honduras national football team in 1946

The national team made its debut in the Independence Centenary Games held in Guatemala City in September 1921, losing 9–0 to Guatemala.

During their first appearance at the Central American and Caribbean Games in 1930, Honduras posted a record of two wins and three losses. Their only wins came against Jamaica (5–1) and El Salvador (4–1), while they lost two games to Cuba and Costa Rica.

=== 1970 World Cup and the Football War ===
Prior to the qualification stages leading up to the 1970 World Cup in Mexico, Honduras and El Salvador found themselves in what was called the Football War. This nickname was given to the situation after a play-off game was played between the two countries to decide which would qualify for the Finals. This political crisis eventually turned into a football war that lasted approximately 100 hours.

Honduras had begun qualifying by defeating Costa Rica and Jamaica. Against Jamaica, they easily won both games, 5–1 on aggregate. They beat Costa Rica 1–0 in Tegucigalpa and drew 1–1 away. This set up a final match between Honduras and El Salvador, who had eliminated Guyana and the Netherlands Antilles.

In the first game against El Salvador, Honduras won 1–0 in Tegucigalpa on 8 June 1969. Honduras were coached by Carlos Padilla Velásquez and the only goal of the game was scored by Leonard Welch. Honduras lost the second game 3–0 in San Salvador, and a play-off was required in the Azteca Stadium in Mexico City on 27 June. El Salvador won 3–2 to qualify and eliminate Honduras from the qualifications.

=== 1982 World Cup ===
Crest in 1976.

Honduras won the 1981 CONCACAF Championship and qualified for the World Cup for the first time in 1982. Despite drawing against the hosts Spain and Northern Ireland, both 1–1, they were eliminated in the first round after losing their last match to Yugoslavia 1–0.

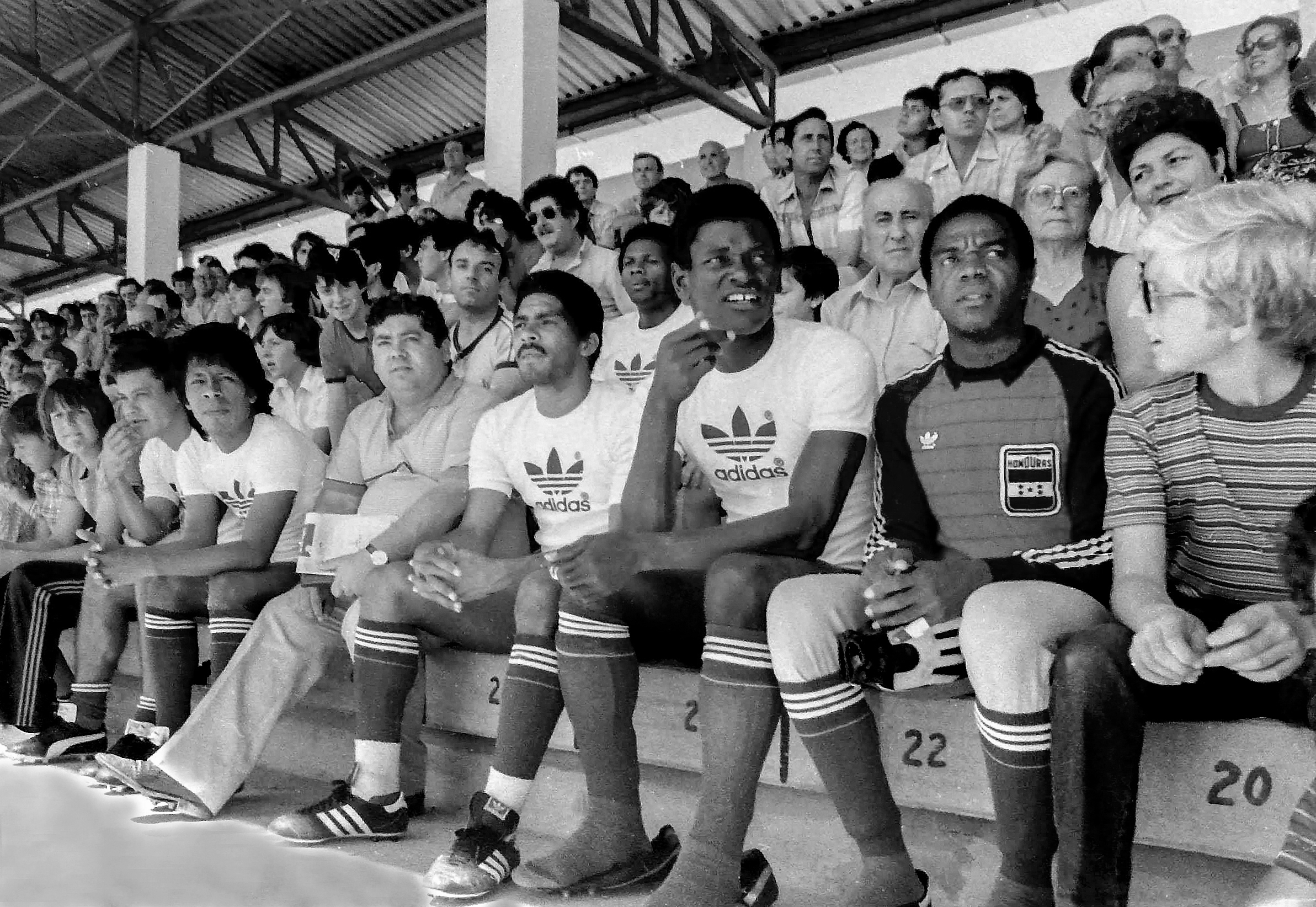
The Honduran team at the 1982 FIFA World Cup

Pos	Team	Pld	W	D	L	GF	GA	GD	Pts	Qualification
1	Northern Ireland	3	1	2	0	2	1	+1	4	Advance to second round
2	Spain (H)	3	1	1	1	3	3	0	3	Advance to second round
3	Yugoslavia	3	1	1	1	2	2	0	3	
4	Honduras	3	0	2	1	2	3	−1	2	

Source: FIFA
(H) Hosts

Honduras finished second in the 1985 CONCACAF Championship, losing their final match 2–1 against Canada, who went on to qualify for the 1986 World Cup. Their next major accomplishment was being runners-up at the 1991 CONCACAF Gold Cup, losing against the host nation, the United States.

For the 1998 World Cup, Jamaica and Mexico eliminated Honduras at the third round stage. Despite Honduras's overwhelming 11–3 victory against Saint Vincent & the Grenadines, Jamaica defeated Mexico at Independence Park, Kingston, allowing the Reggae Boys to advance to the next round.

=== 2001 Copa América ===
Since 1993, CONMEBOL has invited teams from other confederations to participate in their confederation championship, the Copa América. Honduras took part as one of the last-minute teams added for the 2001 tournament, as Argentina dropped out one day before the start. The team arrived only a few hours before the tournament's first game and with barely enough players. Despite the odds, Honduras progressed into the quarter-finals, where they defeated Brazil 2–0. In the semi-finals, Colombia knocked out Honduras 2–0.

Honduras advanced to the final round in the qualifying competition for the 2002 FIFA World Cup, but again failed to qualify after losing at home to Trinidad & Tobago, and away against Mexico in their final two matches. The match against Trinidad, and Tobago saw Honduras hit the goal post eight times.

=== 2010 World Cup ===
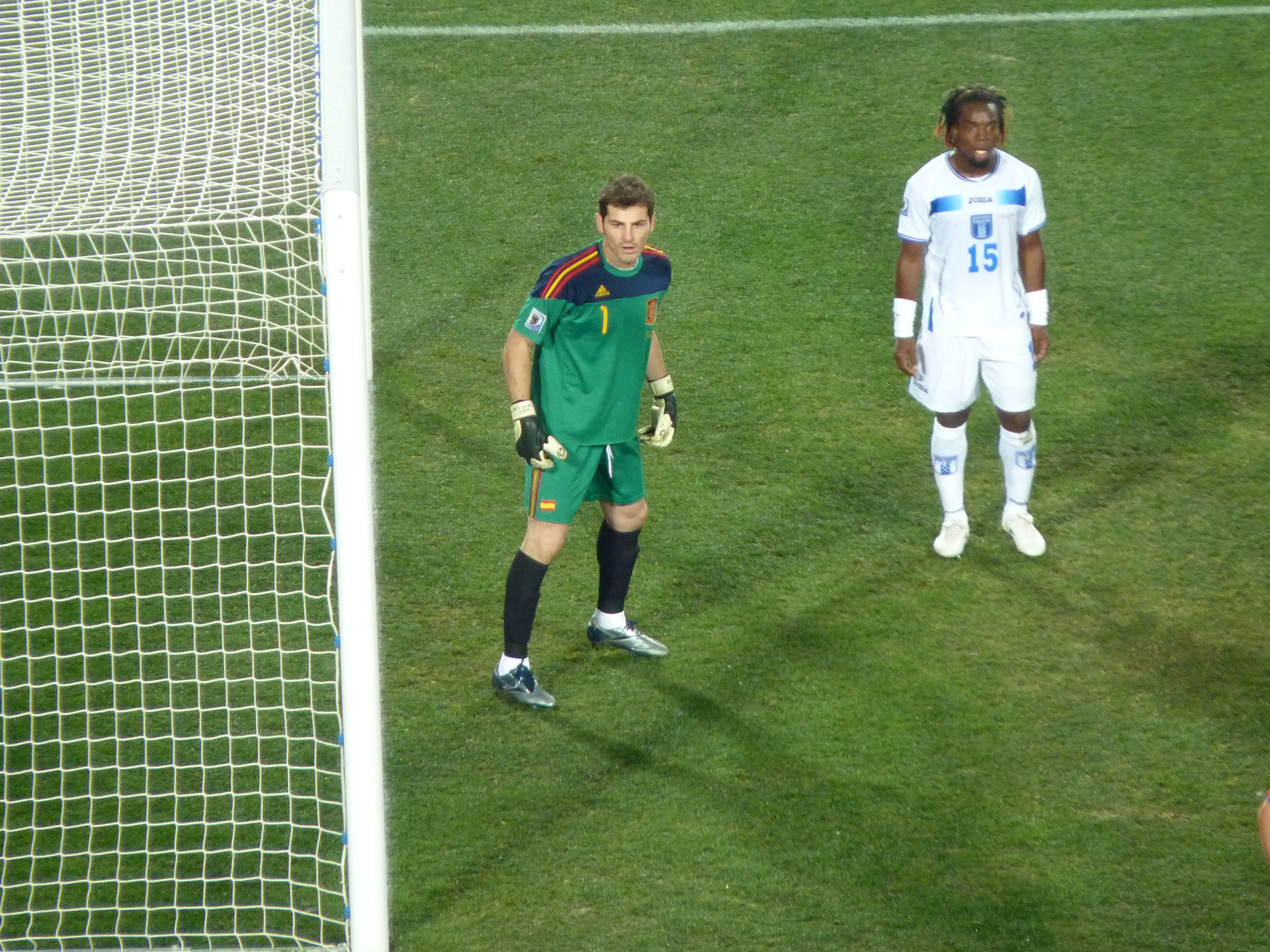
Walter Martinez and Iker Casillas of Spain at the 2010 FIFA World Cup

On 14 October 2009, Honduras qualified for the 2010 World Cup after a 1–0 win against El Salvador gave them the third automatic qualifying spot from the Fourth round of CONCACAF Qualifying.

Honduras faced Chile, Spain, and Switzerland in their first-round group. In their first match they lost to Chile 1–0, to a goal from Jean Beausejour. They then lost 2–0 to Spain, with both goals scored by David Villa. In their last match they drew 0–0 against Switzerland and were eliminated in last place in the group.

Pos	Team	Pld	W	D	L	GF	GA	GD	Pts	Qualification
1	Spain	3	2	0	1	4	2	+2	6	Advance to knockout stage
2	Chile	3	2	0	1	3	2	+1	6	Advance to knockout stage
3	Switzerland	3	1	1	1	1	1	0	4	
4	Honduras	3	0	1	2	0	3	−3	1	

Source: FIFA
Rules for classification: Tie-breaking criteria

=== 2014 World Cup ===
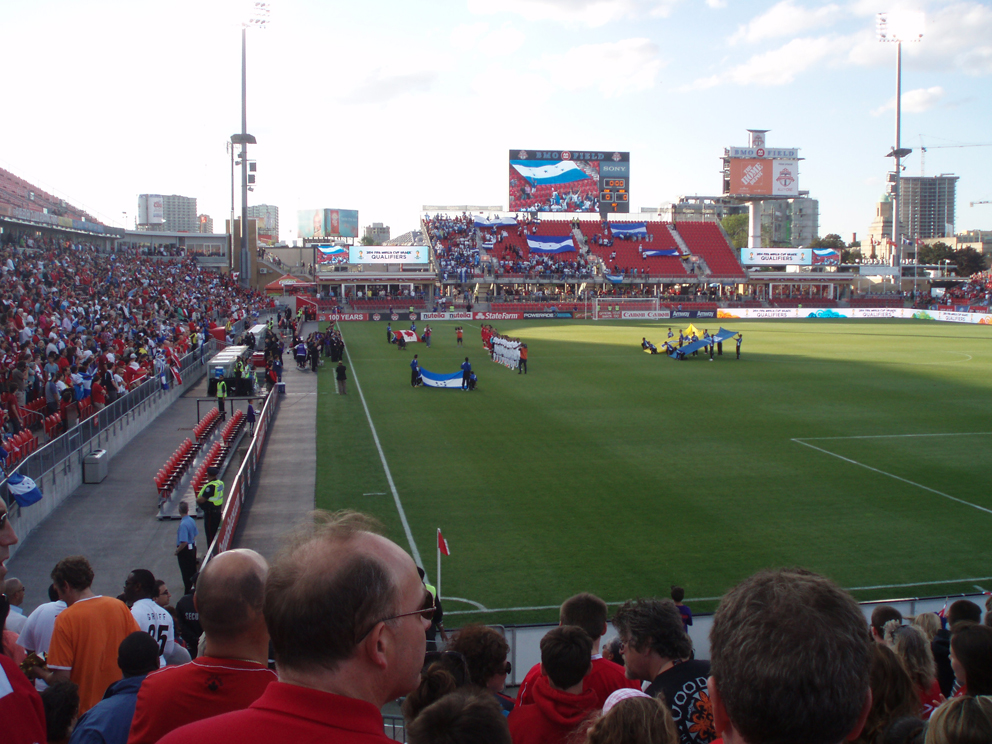
Players lining up during the national anthem prior to the qualifying match against Canada on June 12, 2012, at BMO Field

In the qualifying competition for the 2014 World Cup, Honduras were given a bye to the third round because of their third-place position among CONCACAF teams in the March 2011 FIFA World Rankings. They qualified for the final round by finishing first in their group, which included Panama, Canada and Cuba. After beginning with a home defeat against Panama, Honduras recovered and beat Canada 8–1 in their final match, allowing them to win the group ahead of Panama.

In the final round of qualifying, the Hexagonal, six teams faced each other in a home-and-away format. In their first two games, Honduras defeated the United States 2–1 and came back from a two-goal deficit to draw 2–2 with Mexico. They lost three of their next four matches before traveling to Mexico City to face Mexico in the Azteca. Honduras again trailed but scored twice in the second half for a stunning 2–1 win. They returned to Tegucigalpa, where they drew 2–2 against Panama, who escaped defeat with a last-minute goal by Roberto Chen. In the final two games, Honduras beat Costa Rica 1–0 at home and qualified with a 2–2 draw against Jamaica in Kingston.

Pos	Team	Pld	W	D	L	GF	GA	GD	Pts	Qualification	United States	Costa Rica	Honduras	Mexico	Panama	Jamaica
1	United States	10	7	1	2	15	8	+7	22	Qualification to 2014 FIFA World Cup	—	1–0	1–0	2–0	2–0	2–0
2	Costa Rica	10	5	3	2	13	7	+6	18	Qualification to 2014 FIFA World Cup	3–1	—	1–0	2–1	2–0	2–0
3	Honduras	10	4	3	3	13	12	+1	15	Qualification to 2014 FIFA World Cup	2–1	1–0	—	2–2	2–2	2–0
4	Mexico	10	2	5	3	7	9	−2	11	Advance to inter-confederation play-offs	0–0	0–0	1–2	—	2–1	0–0
5	Panama	10	1	5	4	10	14	−4	8		2–3	2–2	2–0	0–0	—	0–0
6	Jamaica	10	0	5	5	5	13	−8	5		1–2	1–1	2–2	0–1	1–1	—

In the tournament in Brazil, Honduras again finished bottom of their first-round group, after 3–0 defeats against France and Switzerland, and a 2–1 defeat to Ecuador. The match against France featured the first use of goal-line technology to award a goal at the World Cup: an own-goal by Honduras' goalkeeper, Noel Valladares. The goal scored by Carlo Costly against Ecuador was Honduras' first goal in the World Cup in 32 years.

Pos	Team	Pld	W	D	L	GF	GA	GD	Pts	Qualification
1	France	3	2	1	0	8	2	+6	7	Advance to knockout stage
2	Switzerland	3	2	0	1	7	6	+1	6	Advance to knockout stage
3	Ecuador	3	1	1	1	3	3	0	4	
4	Honduras	3	0	0	3	1	8	−7	0	

Source: FIFA
Rules for classification: Tie-breaking criteria

=== Decline ===
Pos	Team	Pld	W	D	L	GF	GA	GD	Pts	Qualification	(Mexico)	(Costa Rica)	(Panama)	(Honduras)	(United States)	(Trinidad and Tobago)
1	Mexico	10	6	3	1	16	7	+9	21	Qualification to 2018 FIFA World Cup	—	2–0	1–0	3–0	1–1	3–1
2	Costa Rica	10	4	4	2	14	8	+6	16	Qualification to 2018 FIFA World Cup	1–1	—	0–0	1–1	4–0	2–1
3	Panama	10	3	4	3	9	10	−1	13	Qualification to 2018 FIFA World Cup	0–0	2–1	—	2–2	1–1	3–0
4	Honduras	10	3	4	3	13	19	−6	13	Advance to inter-confederation play-offs	3–2	1–1	0–1	—	1–1	3–1
5	United States	10	3	3	4	17	13	+4	12		1–2	0–2	4–0	6–0	—	2–0
6	Trinidad and Tobago	10	2	0	8	7	19	−12	6		0–1	0–2	1–0	1–2	2–1	—

Source: FIFA
Rules for classification: Qualification tiebreakers

In 2017, Honduras failed to qualify for the 2018 World Cup. In the Hexagonal stage, they had mixed run of results which included draws against Costa Rica and Panama. On the final matchday, however, Honduras defeated Mexico 3–2 in San Pedro Sula, and coupled with a 2–1 Panamanian victory against Costa Rica and a United States loss to Trinidad and Tobago, Honduras finished in the fourth position to advance to a play-off against Australia. Following a 0–0 draw at home, Honduras were eliminated in the second leg in Sydney with a 3–1 loss. This defeat resulted in the departure of head coach Jorge Luis Pinto, and would be the final involvement of national team veterans Mario Martínez, Johnny Palacios, Donis Escober, and Carlo Costly.

Heading into the 2019 CONCACAF Gold Cup, Uruguayan manager Fabián Coito was appointed as the new head coach of Honduras. Drawn in Group C with expectations to advance to the next round, Honduras finished last in the group, following an opening loss to Jamaica and an upset defeat to Curaçao. Despite a 4–0 win over El Salvador in their final group stage match, Honduras finished last in the group. Heading into the tournament with a newer pool of players, this was the final involvement for veteran full-back duo Emilio Izaguirre and Brayan Beckeles.

In the summer of 2021, Honduras had a strong showing in the inaugural CONCACAF Nations League Finals, defeating rivals Costa Rica in a penalty-shootout in the third place play-off, having been eliminated by the United States 1–0 in the semi-finals. In the 2021 CONCACAF Gold Cup, Honduras would perform better in the group stage largely in part to the offensive contributions of forward duo Alberth Elis and Romell Quioto, but after the pair both suffered injuries in the group stage, Honduras was eliminated by Mexico 3–0 in the quarter-finals.

Heading into 2022 FIFA World Cup qualification in the new "Octagonal" format, Honduras was expected to contend in the qualification spots, however they did considerably worse, as for the first time ever in a World Cup qualification cycle, the team had failed to register a win, with just four draws and ten losses. Despite an initial draw against the eventual first-placed nation Canada, Honduras spiraled in form after suffering a 4–1 loss to the United States in San Pedro Sula, despite leading at half-time. After a string of poor results, head coach Coito was sacked and replaced by Hernán Darío Gómez. Despite the managerial change, the poor run of form would continue as Gómez would experiment with different players, leading to the inability to properly replace past veterans and develop a cohesive squad.

Pos	Team	Pld	W	D	L	GF	GA	GD	Pts	Qualification	Canada	Mexico	United States	Costa Rica	Panama	Jamaica	El Salvador	Honduras
1	Canada	14	8	4	2	23	7	+16	28	2022 FIFA World Cup	—	2–1	2–0	1–0	4–1	4–0	3–0	1–1
2	Mexico	14	8	4	2	17	8	+9	28	2022 FIFA World Cup	1–1	—	0–0	0–0	1–0	2–1	2–0	3–0
3	United States	14	7	4	3	21	10	+11	25	2022 FIFA World Cup	1–1	2–0	—	2–1	5–1	2–0	1–0	3–0
4	Costa Rica	14	7	4	3	13	8	+5	25	Inter-confederation play-offs	1–0	0–1	2–0	—	1–0	1–1	2–1	2–1
5	Panama	14	6	3	5	17	19	−2	21		1–0	1–1	1–0	0–0	—	3–2	2–1	1–1
6	Jamaica	14	2	5	7	12	22	−10	11		0–0	1–2	1–1	0–1	0–3	—	1–1	2–1
7	El Salvador	14	2	4	8	8	18	−10	10		0–2	0–2	0–0	1–2	1–0	1–1	—	0–0
8	Honduras	14	0	4	10	7	26	−19	4		0–2	0–1	1–4	0–0	2–3	0–2	0–2	—

Source: FIFA, CONCACAF
Rules for classification: Tiebreakers

The team's poor showing in qualifying highlighted the main issues within Honduran football, with some pundits bringing attention to said issues, which included poor leadership and direction from FENAFUTH, poor technical staff, and a negligence from the federation towards player infrastructure. The lack of support for proper youth leagues and player development, as well as outdated and limited training facilities were key points in regards to the poor player infrastructure, which also contributed to the poor quality of the national league, leading to the stagnation in Honduran football. After FENAFUTH released a statement in regards to the team's failure, former player and top all-time goalscorer for the national team Carlos Pavón criticized the federation, proclaiming, "Are you serious? How easy it is to be a leader in Honduras, to justify an eight-year failure in a communiqué. The ideal thing would be for the famous committee to show their faces at a press conference and explain what they wrote, wouldn't they?."

At the 2023 CONCACAF Gold Cup, Honduras made a group stage exit, missing out on qualification into the next round due to a lesser goal difference against invited guests Qatar.

In late 2023, Honduras began its journey in the 2023–24 edition of the CONCACAF Nations League. The team was placed in Group B of League A and finished in second, qualifying alongside Jamaica to the quarter-finals, where a spot at the 2024 Copa América was at stake against Mexico. In a two-legged affair, Honduras pulled off an upset in the first leg, defeating Mexico 2–0 in Tegucigalpa with goals from Anthony Lozano and Bryan Róchez. In the return leg in Mexico City, El Tri leveled the aggregate score with a 2–0 win and took the tie to a penalty-shootout, where Mexico were victorious 4–2 and secured a spot in the Copa América. The match became infamous, especially in Honduras, due to referring decisions made by Salvadoran referee Iván Barton. The most notable instances that were highlighted was the equalizing goal scored by Edson Álvarez, which came two minutes after the 9 minutes of added time had already exceeded, and the second instance was during the penalty-shootout when César Huerta was allowed to retake his penalty three times because the Honduran goalkeeper Edrick Menjívar had been off his line the first two times. Honduras later advanced to the Copa América play-in against Costa Rica for a last opportunity to qualify, but were defeated 3–1.

In late 2024, during the 2024–25 edition of the CONCACAF Nations League, Honduras encountered Mexico once again in the quarter-finals, with a spot in the finals and a place in the 2025 CONCACAF Gold Cup on the line. In San Pedro Sula, Honduras would once again emerge victorious in the first leg, 2–0, thanks to a brace from Luis Palma. Mexico overturned the deficit with a 4–0 win in the second leg, qualifying to the Finals and sending Honduras to a Gold Cup qualification tie against Bermuda.

After defeating Bermuda 7–3 on aggregate over two legs, Honduras opened their 2025 Gold Cup campaign with a 6–0 loss to Canada. Despite the initial setback, La H recorded wins against El Salvador and Curaçao, finishing second in their group. In what was seen a surprise and upset by some, Honduras would prevail over Panama in the quarter-finals. After finishing 1–1 in regulatory time, Honduras advanced 5–4 on penalties. Los Catrachos would then face Mexico in the semifinals, where they lost 1–0.

In late 2025, Honduras entered the third round of World Cup qualifying. With the expansion to a 48-team World Cup and the automatic qualification of the hosts United States, Mexico, and Canada, this cycle was seen as an opportunity to for Honduras and other Central American nations to carve an easy path to the 2026 FIFA World Cup, but several factors turned this cycle into a drastic failure. Drawn into Group C with Costa Rica, Haiti, and Nicaragua, Honduras recorded 8 points after four fixtures with two games remaining, and Los Catrachos needed just one win to secure direct qualification to the World Cup, but in a shock upset, Honduras lost to Nicaragua 2–0 in Managua. Despite the setback, Honduras still sat in the first position of Group C, but still needed to secure a win against Costa Rica in San José. In a must-win for both nations, the final score on matchday six was 0–0, effectively eliminating both Honduras and Costa Rica from World Cup contention. Both teams required a win to control their own destiny, in Honduras' case, they needed at least a 1–0 win to still advance automatically. While Honduras finished second in their group and tied with Suriname for the final inter-confederation playoff spot, they were eliminated because Suriname scored more goals (9 vs. 5) throughout the qualifying round. Honduras drew heavy criticism from supporters and analysts alike for what was seen as "tactical suicide" because they actively wasted time during the final minutes of their 0–0 draw with Costa Rica, seemingly unaware that a draw would eliminate them both. Instead of pushing for a winning goal which they needed to stay ahead of Suriname in the tiebreaker, Honduran players continued to run down the clock as if the draw were a favorable result.

== Home stadium ==
Honduras has played the majority of its home matches, at Estadio Nacional Chelato Uclés in Tegucigalpa.

The national team formerly played at Estadio Olímpico Metropolitano in San Pedro Sula, which stopped being the home stadium due to declining facilities. Estadio Francisco Morazán also occasionally hosts home games. After its construction for the 1997 Central American Games, Estadio Olímpico Metropolitano in San Pedro Sula, became an important home venue but has fallen out of favor due to investment in an hybrid pitch system in Estadio Nacional and Estadio Morazan.

Estadio Nilmo Edwards in La Ceiba has also hosted friendly exhibition matches and also in the past ; Estadio Humberto Micheleti; Estadio Juan Ramón Brevé Vargas; and Estadio Carlos Miranda.

== Team image ==
=== Kit sponsorship ===
Kit supplier	Period
(Germany) Adidas	1982–1988
(Costa Rica) Desport	1989–1991
(United States) Pony	1991–1992
(United States) Score	1992–1993
(Peru) Polmer	1994–1995
(United States) Score	1996–1997
(Spain) Joma	1998–present

== Results and fixtures ==
The following is a list of match results in the last 12 months, as well as any future matches that have been scheduled.

Win Draw Loss Fixture

=== 2026 ===
31 March Friendly	Peru	2–2	Honduras	Leganés, Spain
20:00 UTC+2	Vélez 6', 58'	Report	Palma 44'; Mencía 90+4'	Stadium: Estadio Ontime Butarque; Referee: Guillermo Cuadra Fernández (Spain)

6 June Friendly	Argentina	2–0	Honduras	College Station, United States
19:00 UTC−5	L. Martínez 37' (pen.); Simeone 54'	Report		Stadium: Kyle Field; Attendance: 91,102; Referee: Victor Rivas (United States)

25 September 2026–27 Nations League	Honduras	2–3	Suriname	Tegucigalpa, Honduras
19:00 UTC−5	Moncada 20'; Róchez 23'	Report	Lonwijk 18'; Jubitana 39'; Palma 66' (o.g.)	Stadium: Estadio Nacional Chelato Uclés; Attendance: 8,707; Referee: Fernando Hernández (Mexico)

28 September 2026–27 Nations League	Jamaica	0–1	Honduras	Kingston, Jamaica
19:00 UTC−5		Report	Figueroa 14'	Stadium: Independence Park; Attendance: 3,173; Referee: Juan Gabriel Calderón (Costa Rica)

2 October 2026–27 Nations League	Martinique	2–1	Honduras	Fort-de-France, Martinique
20:00 UTC−4	Varane 40'; Mexique 88'	Report	Puerto 8'	Stadium: Stade Pierre-Aliker; Attendance: 1,325; Referee: Kwinsi Williams (Trinidad and Tobago)

5 October 2026–27 Nations League	Honduras	1–1	Jamaica	Tegucigalpa, Honduras
20:00 UTC−6	Palma 51'	Report	Campbell 27'	Stadium: Estadio Nacional Chelato Uclés; Attendance: 9,574; Referee: Marco Ortíz (Mexico)

13 November Friendly	United Arab Emirates	3–1	Honduras	Abu Dhabi, United Arab Emirates
18:15 UTC+4	Al Hammadi 33'; Bruno 48'; Juma 87'	Report	Toro 52'	Stadium: Mohammed bin Zayed Stadium; Referee: Ahmad Al-Ali (Kuwait)

17 November Friendly	Kuwait	0–2	Honduras	Kuwait City, Kuwait
19:30 UTC+3		Report	Rosales 21'; Moncada 37'	Stadium: Al-Sadaqua Walsalam Stadium; Referee: Mohamed Al-Mazyed (Qatar)

== Coaching staff ==
As of 1 March 2026

Position	Name
Head coach	(Spain) Francisco Molina
Assistant coach	(Serbia) Igor Tasevski
Assistant coach	(Spain) José Vicente Carrascosa
Goalkeeping coach	(Spain) Francisco Martínez
Fitness coach	(Spain) Sergio García
Video Analyst	(Spain) Jesus Lomas
Sporting director	(Spain) Francis Hernandez
Team manager	(Honduras) Luis Breve (Honduras) Jose Guevara
Press officer	(Honduras) Edwin Banegas
Photographer and social media	(Honduras) Magdiel Lagos
Nutritionist	(Spain) Miguel Mariscal
Chef	(Honduras) Oswaldo Sandoval
Doctor	(Honduras) Jose Murillo
Physiotherapy	(Honduras) Josue Fortin
Physiotherapy	(Honduras) Gerardo Mejia
Physiotherapy	(Honduras) Marcio Rivera
(Spain) Javier Avila
Equipment manager	(Honduras) Kelsim Flores
Equipment manager	(Honduras) Agustin Mejia
Equipment manager	(Honduras) Daniel Bueso

=== Coaching history ===
- (Honduras) Aristides Raudales (1921)
- (Honduras) Octavio Arriola (1930)
- (Honduras) Jacobo de Fuenquinos (1935)
- (Hungary) István Kovács (1946)
- (Honduras) Lurio Martinez (1953)
- (Brazil) Otto Bumbel (1955–1956)
- (Honduras) Mario Grifffin Cubas (1961)
- (Honduras) Carlos Padilla (1960–1962)
- (Brazil) Elsy Núñez (1962–1966)
- (Honduras) Marinho Rodríguez (1966–1967)
- (Chile) Sergio Lecea (1967–1968)
- (Honduras) Carlos Padilla (1968–1973)
- (Germany) Peter Lange (1974–1976)
- (Honduras) José Herrera (1980–1986)
- (Netherlands) Ger Blok (1987–1988)
- (Honduras) José Herrera (1988)
- (Brazil) Flavio Ortega (1991–1992)
- (Uruguay) Estanislao Malinowski (1992–1993)
- (Uruguay) Julio González (1993)
- (Honduras) Carlos Cruz (1995)
- (Brazil) Ernesto Rosa (1996)
- (Honduras) Ramón Maradiaga (1996)
- (Peru) Miguel Company (1997–1998)
- (Honduras) Ramón Maradiaga (1998–2002)
- (Uruguay) Ernesto Luzardo (2002)
- (Honduras) Edwin Pavón (2003)
- (Honduras) José Herrera (2003)
- (Brazil) René Simões (2003)
- (Serbia and Montenegro) Bora Milutinović (2003–2004)
- (Honduras) José Herrera (2005)
- (Honduras) Raúl Martínez (2006)
- (Brazil) Flavio Ortega (2006–2007)
- (Colombia) Reinaldo Rueda (2007–2010)
- (Mexico) Juan Castillo (2010–2011)
- (Colombia) Luis Suárez (2011–2014)
- (Costa Rica) Hernán Medford (2014)
- (Colombia) Jorge Pinto (2014–2017)
- (Honduras) Carlos Tábora (2018)
- (Honduras) Jorge Jimenez (2018)
- (Uruguay) Fabián Coito (2019–2021)
- (Colombia) Hernán Darío Gómez (2021–2022)
- (Argentina) Diego Vásquez (2022–2023)
- (Colombia) Reinaldo Rueda (2023–2025)
- (Spain) Francisco Molina (2026–present)

== Players ==
=== Current squad ===
The following 26 players were called up for the friendly matches against the United Arab Emirates and Kuwait on 13 and 17 November 2026 respectively.

Information correct as of 17 November 2026, after the match against Kuwait.

No.	Pos.	Player	Date of birth (age)	Caps	Goals	Club
1	GK	Edrick Menjívar	1 March 1993 (age 33)	47	0	(National Autonomous Federation of Football of Honduras) Olimpia
12	GK	Alex Güity	10 September 1997 (age 29)	2	0	(National Autonomous Federation of Football of Honduras) UPNFM
22	GK	Enrique Facussé	30 December 1998 (age 27)	0	0	(National Autonomous Federation of Football of Honduras) Juticalpa
2	DF	Denil Maldonado	26 May 1998 (age 28)	46	1	(Russian Football Union) Rubin Kazan
3	DF	Julián Martínez	1 December 2003 (age 22)	15	1	(Portuguese Football Federation) Alverca
4	DF	Giancarlo Sacaza	18 January 2004 (age 22)	8	0	(National Autonomous Federation of Football of Honduras) Motagua
5	DF	Darlin Mencía	9 April 2003 (age 23)	2	1	(Uruguayan Football Association) Montevideo Wanderers
6	DF	Santos Martínez	1 March 2002 (age 24)	2	0	(National Autonomous Federation of Football of Honduras) Marathón
8	DF	Joseph Rosales	6 November 2000 (age 26)	42	1	(United States Soccer Federation) Austin FC
18	DF	Clinton Bennett	31 October 2002 (age 24)	2	0	(National Autonomous Federation of Football of Honduras) Olimpia
25	DF	Kevin Pérez	2 April 2009 (age 17)	0	0	(National Autonomous Federation of Football of Honduras) Génesis PN
26	DF	Kevin Gyamfi	1 January 2011 (age 15)	0	0	(Royal Spanish Football Federation) Espanyol
11	MF	David Ruiz	8 February 2004 (age 22)	11	3	(United States Soccer Federation) New York Red Bulls
13	MF	Diego Matute	1 January 2009 (age 17)	1	0	(Royal Spanish Football Federation) Celta Vigo
14	MF	José Reyes	5 November 1997 (age 29)	8	0	(National Autonomous Federation of Football of Honduras) Motagua
16	MF	Edwin Rodríguez	25 September 1999 (age 27)	51	6	(National Autonomous Federation of Football of Honduras) Olimpia
20	MF	Deiby Flores	16 June 1996 (age 30)	63	1	(Angolan Football Federation) Petro de Luanda
21	MF	Jonathan Toro	21 October 1996 (age 30)	20	4	(Angolan Football Federation) Petro de Luanda
23	MF	Roberto Osorto	18 January 2006 (age 20)	1	0	(National Autonomous Federation of Football of Honduras) Real España
7	FW	Rigoberto Rivas	31 July 1998 (age 28)	29	1	(Turkish Football Federation) Kocaelispor
9	FW	Keyrol Figueroa	31 August 2006 (age 20)	7	1	(The Football Association) Port Vale
10	FW	Luis Palma	17 January 2000 (age 26)	41	8	(Polish Football Association) Lech Poznań
15	FW	Alenis Vargas	4 December 2003 (age 22)	6	0	(Turkish Football Federation) Manisa
17	FW	Dereck Moncada	30 November 2007 (age 18)	10	2	(Swiss Football Association) Lugano
19	FW	Erick Puerto	28 October 2001 (age 25)	5	1	(Football Federation of Belarus) BATE Borisov
24	FW	Mike Arana	22 January 2009 (age 17)	5	0	(National Autonomous Federation of Football of Honduras) Real España

=== Recent call-ups ===
The following players have been called up to the national team in the past 12 months but are not part of the current squad.

Pos.	Player	Date of birth (age)	Caps	Goals	Club	Latest call-up
GK	Luis Ortiz	23 January 1998 (age 28)	1	0	(Honduras) Motagua	v. Jamaica, 5 October 2026
DF	Luis Vega	28 February 2001 (age 25)	34	1	(Honduras) Motagua	v. Jamaica, 5 October 2026
DF	Cristopher Meléndez	25 November 1997 (age 28)	10	0	(Honduras) Motagua	v. Jamaica, 5 October 2026
DF	Clever Portillo	2 December 2002 (age 23)	1	0	(Honduras) Motagua	v. Jamaica, 5 October 2026
DF	Victor Vandenbroucke	27 September 2008 (age 18)	0	0	(Belgium) Gent	v. Jamaica, 28 September 2026
DF	José Aguilera	25 February 2002 (age 24)	1	0	(Honduras) Marathón	v. Argentina, 6 June 2026
DF	Kevin Güity	8 March 2003 (age 23)	0	0	(Honduras) Olimpia	v. Argentina, 6 June 2026
DF	Cristián Canales	1 January 2007 (age 19)	1	0	(Honduras) Olimpia	v. Argentina, 6 June 2026
MF	Kervin Arriaga	5 January 1998 (age 28)	49	4	(Greece) AEK Athens	v. Jamaica, 5 October 2026
MF	Nixon Cruz	3 August 2006 (age 20)	0	0	(Honduras) Real España	v. Suriname, 25 September 2026 ^{EXC}
MF	Jorge Álvarez	29 January 1998 (age 28)	41	2	(Honduras) Olimpia	v. Argentina, 6 June 2026
MF	Leandro Padilla	21 October 2009 (age 17)	0	0	(United States) Inter Miami II	v. Peru, 31 March 2026
MF	Leonardo Posadas	1 January 2005 (age 21)	0	0	(Germany) TSV Havelse	v. Peru, 31 March 2026
FW	Bryan Róchez	1 January 1995 (age 31)	32	6	(Portugal) Leixões	v. United Arab Emirates, 13 November 2026 ^{WD}
FW	Exon Arzú	19 April 2004 (age 22)	3	0	(Venezuela) Carabobo	v. Jamaica, 5 October 2026
FW	Jorge Benguché	21 May 1996 (age 30)	32	5	(Honduras) Olimpia	v. Argentina, 6 June 2026
FW	Jeffry Miranda	3 September 2002 (age 24)	1	0	(Honduras) Motagua	v. Argentina, 6 June 2026
^{INJ} Player withdrew due to injury^{WD} Player withdrew for personal reasons^{PRE} Preliminary squad^{EXC} Excluded from squad^{SUS} Suspended^{RET} Player retired from the national team

== Records ==
As of 19 November 2025
Players in bold are still active with Honduras.

=== Most appearances ===
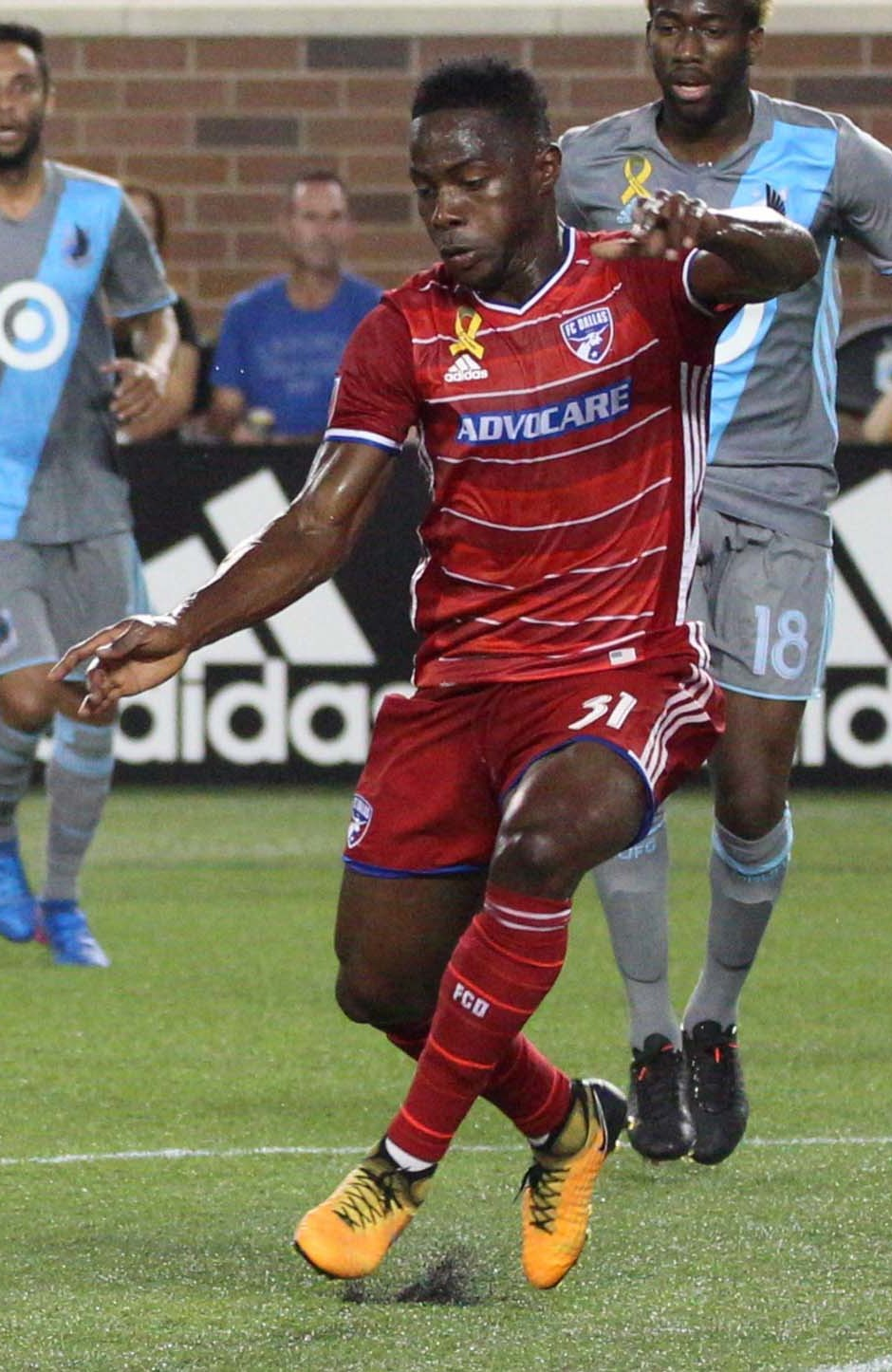
Maynor Figueroa is Honduras's most capped player with 181 appearances.

Rank	Player	Caps	Goals	Career
1	Maynor Figueroa	181	5	2003–2022
2	Amado Guevara	138	27	1994–2010
3	Noel Valladares	135	0	2000–2016
4	Boniek García	134	3	2005–2021
5	Emilio Izaguirre	111	5	2007–2020
6	Carlos Pavón	101	57	1993–2010
7	Wilson Palacios	97	5	2003–2014
8	Danilo Turcios	87	7	1999–2010
9	Víctor Bernárdez	86	4	2004–2014
9	Milton Núñez	86	33	1994–2008

=== Top goalscorers ===
Rank	Player	Goals	Caps	Ratio	Career
1	Carlos Pavón	57	101	0.56	1993–2010
2	Wilmer Velásquez	35	47	0.74	1994–2007
3	Milton Núñez	33	86	0.38	1994–2008
4	Carlo Costly	32	78	0.41	2007–2017
5	Nicolás Suazo	28	51	0.55	1991–1998
6	Amado Guevara	27	138	0.2	1994–2010
7	Jerry Bengtson	23	70	0.33	2010–2024
8	Eduardo Bennett	19	36	0.53	1991–2000
8	Romell Quioto	19	82	0.23	2012–2025
10	David Suazo	17	57	0.3	1999–2012

== Competitive record ==
=== FIFA World Cup ===
FIFA World Cup record										Qualification record					
Year	Round	Position	Pld	W	D	L	GF	GA	Squad	Pld	W	D	L	GF	GA
(Uruguay) 1930	Not a FIFA member									Not a FIFA member					
(Italy) 1934	Not a FIFA member									Not a FIFA member					
(France) 1938	Not a FIFA member									Not a FIFA member					
(Brazil) 1950	Declined participation									Declined participation					
(Switzerland) 1954	Declined participation									Declined participation					
(Sweden) 1958	Declined participation									Declined participation					
(Chile) 1962	Did not qualify									5	2	1	2	5	8
(England) 1966	Did not qualify									4	0	1	3	1	6
(Mexico) 1970	Did not qualify									7	4	1	2	10	8
(West Germany) 1974	Did not qualify									7	2	4	1	11	10
(Argentina) 1978	Withdrew									Withdrew					
(Spain) 1982	Group stage	18th	3	0	2	1	2	3	Squad	13	8	4	1	23	6
(Mexico) 1986	Did not qualify									10	5	3	2	15	9
(Italy) 1990	Did not qualify									2	0	2	0	1	1
(United States) 1994	Did not qualify									14	6	3	5	23	20
(France) 1998	Did not qualify									6	3	1	2	18	11
(South Korea) (Japan) 2002	Did not qualify									22	14	2	6	56	25
(Germany) 2006	Did not qualify									8	3	4	1	15	8
(South Africa) 2010	Group stage	30th	3	0	1	2	0	3	Squad	18	10	2	6	32	18
(Brazil) 2014	Group stage	31st	3	0	0	3	1	8	Squad	16	7	5	4	25	15
(Russia) 2018	Did not qualify									18	5	7	6	20	28
(Qatar) 2022	Did not qualify									14	0	4	10	7	26
(Canada) (Mexico) (United States) 2026	Did not qualify									10	6	3	1	17	4
(Morocco) (Portugal) (Spain) 2030	To be determined									To be determined					
(Saudi Arabia) 2034	To be determined									To be determined					
Total	Group stage	3/20	9	0	3	6	3	14	—	174	75	47	52	279	203

FIFA World Cup history
First match	Spain 1–1 Honduras (16 June 1982; Valencia, Spain)
Biggest win	—
Biggest defeat	France 3–0 Honduras (15 June 2014; Porto Alegre, Brazil)
Best result	Group stage (1982, 2010, 2014)
Worst result	—

=== CONCACAF Gold Cup ===
CONCACAF Championship & Gold Cup record										Qualification record					
Year	Round	Position	Pld	W	D*	L	GF	GA	Squad	Pld	W	D	L	GF	GA
(El Salvador) 1963	Fourth place	4th	7	3	1	3	8	12	Squad	Qualified automatically					
(Guatemala) 1965	Did not qualify									2	0	0	2	1	5
(Honduras) 1967	Third place	3rd	5	2	2	1	4	2	Squad	Qualified as hosts					
(Costa Rica) 1969	Banned									Banned					
(Trinidad and Tobago) 1971	Sixth place	6th	5	0	1	4	5	11	Squad	2	1	1	0	2	1
(Haiti) 1973	Fourth place	4th	5	1	3	1	6	6	Squad	2	1	1	0	5	4
(Mexico) 1977	Did not enter									Did not enter					
(Honduras) 1981	Champions	1st	5	3	2	0	8	1	Squad	8	5	2	1	15	5
1985	Runners-up	2nd	8	3	3	2	11	9	Squad	2	2	0	0	4	0
1989	Did not qualify									2	0	2	0	1	1
(United States) 1991	Runners-up	2nd	5	3	2	0	12	3	Squad	5	2	1	2	5	5
(Mexico) (United States) 1993	Group stage	5th	3	1	0	2	6	5	Squad	3	3	0	0	7	0
(United States) 1996	Group stage	8th	2	0	0	2	1	8	Squad	4	3	1	0	8	1
(United States) 1998	Group stage	9th	2	0	0	2	1	5	Squad	5	2	1	2	8	5
(United States) 2000	Quarter-finals	6th	3	2	0	1	7	5	Squad	5	4	0	1	11	5
(United States) 2002	Did not qualify									3	1	1	1	12	5
(Mexico) (United States) 2003	Group stage	10th	2	0	1	1	1	2	Squad	7	3	1	3	10	7
(United States) 2005	Semi-finals	3rd	5	3	1	1	8	6	Squad	5	3	2	0	12	3
(United States) 2007	Quarter-finals	5th	4	2	0	2	10	6	Squad	3	1	1	1	11	5
(United States) 2009	Semi-finals	3rd	5	3	0	2	6	4	Squad	5	4	0	1	9	3
(United States) 2011	Semi-finals	4th	5	1	2	2	8	5	Squad	4	3	1	0	8	3
(United States) 2013	Semi-finals	4th	5	3	0	2	5	5	Squad	4	1	2	1	3	3
(Canada) (United States) 2015	Group stage	11th	3	0	1	2	2	4	Squad	4	2	0	2	3	3
(United States) 2017	Quarter-finals	7th	4	1	1	2	3	2	Squad	5	4	1	0	7	3
(Costa Rica) (Jamaica) (United States) 2019	Group stage	10th	3	1	0	2	6	4	Squad	Qualified automatically					
(United States) 2021	Quarter-finals	8th	4	2	0	2	7	7	Squad	4	3	1	0	8	1
(Canada) (United States) 2023	Group stage	10th	3	1	1	1	3	6	Squad	4	2	0	2	5	7
(Canada) (United States) 2025	Semi-finals	4th	5	2	1	2	5	9	Squad	8	5	1	2	17	11
Total	1 Title	23/28	98	37	22	39	133	127	—	96	55	20	21	172	86

=== CONCACAF Nations League ===
CONCACAF Nations League record
League phase / Quarter-finals										Finals								
Season	Division	Group	Pld	W	D	L	GF	GA	P/R	Year	Result	Pld	W	D	L	GF	GA	Squad
2019–20	A	C	6	3	2	1	10	4	Same position	(United States) 2021	Third place	2	0	1	1	2	3	Squad
2022–23	A	C	4	2	0	2	5	7	Same position	(United States) 2023	Did not qualify							
2023–24	A	B	6	3	1	2	10	3	Same position	(United States) 2024	Did not qualify							
2024–25	A	B	6	3	1	2	10	8	Same position	(United States) 2025	Did not qualify							
2026–27	A	B	4	1	1	2	5	6	Same position	(United States) 2027	Did not qualify							
Total	—	—	26	12	5	9	40	28	—	Total	0 Titles	2	0	1	1	2	0	—

CONCACAF Nations League history
First match	Trinidad and Tobago 0–2 Honduras (10 October 2019; Port of Spain, Trinidad and Tobago)
Biggest win	Honduras 4–0 Trinidad and Tobago (17 October 2019; San Pedro Sula, Honduras); Honduras 4–0 Grenada (12 September 2023; Tegucigalpa, Honduras); Honduras 4–0 Cuba (15 October 2023; Tegucigalpa, Honduras); Honduras 4–0 Trinidad and Tobago (6 September 2024; Tegucigalpa, Honduras)
Biggest defeat	Mexico 4–0 Honduras (19 November 2024; Toluca, Mexico)
Best result	Third place (2019–20)
Worst result	Seventh place (2022–23)

=== Copa América ===
Copa América record
Year	Round	Position	Pld	W	D	L	GF	GA	Squad
(Colombia) 2001	Third place	3rd	6	3	1	2	7	5	Squad
(United States) 2016	Did not qualify								
(United States) 2024	Did not qualify								
Total	Third place	1/3	6	3	1	2	7	5	—

Copa América history
First match	Honduras 0–1 Costa Rica (13 July 2001; Medellín, Colombia)
Biggest win	Honduras 2–0 Bolivia (16 July 2001; Medellín, Colombia); Honduras 2–0 Brazil (23 July 2001; Manizales, Colombia)
Biggest defeat	Colombia 2–0 Honduras (26 July 2001; Manizales, Colombia)
Best result	Third place (2001)
Worst result	—

=== Copa Centroamericana ===
Copa Centroamericana record
Year	Round	Position	Pld	W	D	L	GF	GA
(Costa Rica) 1991	Runners-up	2nd	5	2	1	2	5	5
(Honduras) 1993	Champions	1st	3	3	0	0	7	0
(El Salvador) 1995	Champions	1st	4	3	1	0	8	1
(Guatemala) 1997	Fourth place	4th	5	2	1	2	8	5
(Costa Rica) 1999	Third place	3rd	5	4	0	1	11	5
(Honduras) 2001	Group stage	5th	3	1	1	1	12	5
(Panama) 2003	Fourth place	4th	5	1	1	3	4	5
(Guatemala) 2005	Runners-up	2nd	5	3	2	0	12	3
(El Salvador) 2007	Fifth place	5th	3	1	1	1	11	5
(Honduras) 2009	Third place	3rd	5	4	0	1	9	3
(Panama) 2011	Champions	1st	4	3	1	0	8	3
(Costa Rica) 2013	Runners-up	2nd	4	1	2	1	3	3
(United States) 2014	Fifth place	5th	4	2	0	2	3	3
(Panama) 2017	Champions	1st	5	4	1	0	7	3
Total	4 Titles	14/14	60	34	12	14	108	49

=== CCCF Championship ===
CCCF Championship record
Year	Round	Position	Pld	W	D	L	GF	GA
(Costa Rica) 1941	Did not enter							
(El Salvador) 1943	Did not enter							
(Costa Rica) 1946	Fourth place	4th	5	2	0	3	17	12
(Guatemala) 1948	Did not enter							
(Panama) 1951	Did not enter							
(Costa Rica) 1953	Runners-up	2nd	6	4	0	2	13	10
(Honduras) 1955	Third place	3rd	6	3	1	2	9	6
(Netherlands Antilles) 1957	Third place	3rd	4	2	1	1	6	4
(Cuba) 1960	Third place	3rd	4	0	3	1	6	7
(Costa Rica) 1961	Third place	3rd	6	3	0	3	13	11
Total	Runners-up	6/10	31	14	5	12	64	50

=== Pan American Games ===
Pan American Games record
Year	Round	Position	Pld	W	D	L	GF	GA
(Argentina) 1951	Did not participate							
(Mexico) 1955	Did not participate							
(United States) 1959	Did not participate							
(Brazil) 1963	Did not participate							
(Canada) 1967	Did not participate							
(Colombia) 1971	Did not participate							
(Mexico) 1975	Did not participate							
(Puerto Rico) 1979	Did not participate							
(Venezuela) 1983	Did not participate							
(United States) 1987	Did not participate							
(Cuba) 1991	Fourth place	4th	5	1	1	3	6	11
(Argentina) 1995	Fourth place	4th	6	1	2	3	8	10
Since 1999	See Honduras national under-23 football team							
Total	Fourth place	2/12	11	2	3	6	14	21

=== Central American and Caribbean Games ===
Central American and Caribbean Games record
Year	Round	Position	Pld	W	D	L	GF	GA
(Cuba) 1930	Bronze medal	3rd	5	2	0	3	9	22
(El Salvador) 1935	Fifth place	5th	5	1	1	3	6	20
(Panama) 1938	Did not participate							
(Colombia) 1946	Did not participate							
(Guatemala) 1950	Bronze medal	3rd	6	3	0	3	7	6
(Mexico) 1954	Did not participate							
(Venezuela) 1959	Did not participate							
(Jamaica) 1962	Did not participate							
(Puerto Rico) 1966	Did not participate							
(Panama) 1970	Did not participate							
(Dominican Republic) 1974	Did not participate							
(Colombia) 1978	Did not participate							
(Cuba) 1982	Did not participate							
(Dominican Republic) 1986	Silver medal	2nd	5	4	1	0	7	1
Since 1990	Youth teams participated							
Total	1 Silver medal	4/14	21	10	2	9	29	49

== Head-to-head record ==
As of 17 November 2026.

Positive Record Neutral Record Negative Record

Opponents	Pld	W	D	L	GF	GA	GD
Antigua and Barbuda	2	2	0	0	3	0	+3
Argentina	4	0	0	4	1	9	-8
Aruba	2	0	2	0	4	4	0
Australia	2	0	1	1	1	3	-2
Azerbaijan	1	0	1	0	0	0	0
Belarus	2	0	2	0	3	3	0
Belize	9	9	0	0	24	3	+21
Bermuda	3	3	0	0	13	4	+9
Bolivia	5	1	2	2	3	4	-1
Brazil	8	1	1	6	6	29	-23
Canada	29	12	7	10	44	42	+2
Cayman Islands	1	1	0	0	1	0	+1
Chile	8	3	0	5	13	17	-4
China	5	1	3	1	1	3	-2
Colombia	15	6	4	5	14	13	+1
Costa Rica	71	19	26	26	84	114	-30
Cuba	18	10	3	5	34	24	+10
Curaçao (Note: Includes matches against Netherlands Antilles.)	15	7	3	5	28	25	+3
Denmark	3	1	1	1	2	4	-2
Dominican Republic	1	1	0	0	2	0	+2
Ecuador	19	3	9	7	18	24	-6
El Salvador	78	39	21	18	126	76	+50
England	1	0	1	0	0	0	0
Finland	1	0	0	1	1	2	-1
France	1	0	0	1	0	3	-3
French Guiana	5	3	1	1	10	5	+5
Germany (Note: Includes matches against West Germany.)	1	0	0	1	1	3	-2
Greece	1	0	0	1	1	2	-1
Grenada	4	4	0	0	19	1	+18
Guadeloupe	1	0	0	1	1	2	-1
Guatemala	52	20	18	14	61	58	+3
Haiti	20	14	1	5	39	14	+25
Hong Kong	1	1	0	0	1	0	+1
Iceland	1	0	0	1	0	2	-2
Israel	2	0	0	2	2	6	-4
Jamaica	32	13	7	12	50	36	+14
Japan	3	0	1	2	7	14	-7
Kuwait	1	1	0	0	2	0	+2
Latvia	1	1	0	0	2	1	+1
Martinique	4	2	1	1	7	5	+2
Mexico	51	10	10	31	39	92	-53
New Zealand	3	0	1	2	1	3	-2
Nicaragua	27	22	3	2	82	18	+64
Northern Ireland	1	0	1	0	1	1	0
Norway	1	0	0	1	1	3	-2
Panama	52	26	13	13	77	42	+35
Paraguay	8	1	4	3	6	11	-5
Peru	10	2	6	2	12	12	0
Puerto Rico	3	2	1	0	10	2	+8
Qatar	3	0	1	2	1	4	-3
Romania	4	0	3	1	3	6	-3
Saint Vincent and the Grenadines	6	6	0	0	36	4	+32
Saudi Arabia	1	0	1	0	0	0	0
Serbia (Note: Includes matches against Yugoslavia.)	2	1	0	1	2	1	+1
Slovenia	1	1	0	0	5	1	+4
South Africa	1	0	1	0	1	1	0
South Korea	3	0	0	3	0	9	-9
Spain	2	0	1	1	1	3	-2
Suriname	4	1	2	1	6	6	0
Switzerland	2	0	1	1	0	3	-3
Trinidad and Tobago	21	12	6	3	39	19	+20
Turkey	3	0	0	3	0	5	-5
United Arab Emirates	4	1	2	1	3	4	-1
United States	32	5	8	19	28	57	-29
Uruguay	2	2	0	0	3	2	+1
Venezuela	13	4	2	7	15	15	0
Zambia	1	1	0	0	7	1	+6
Total (67)	694	275	183	236	1,009	880	+129

== Honours ==
=== Continental ===
- CONCACAF Championship / Gold Cup
  - Champions (1): 1981
  - (silver) Runners-up (2): 1985, 1991
  - (bronze) Third place (1): 1967
- CONCACAF Nations League
  - (bronze) Third place (1): 2019–20
- CONMEBOL Copa América
  - (bronze) Third place (1): 2001

=== Subcontinental ===
- CCCF Championship (Note: Official competition organized by CCCF, the former subcontinental confederation affiliated with FIFA as the governing body of football in the Central American and Caribbean Zones (1938–1961), and a direct predecessor of CONCACAF.)
  - (silver) Runners-up (1): 1953
  - (bronze) Third place (4): 1955, 1957, 1960, 1961
- Copa de Naciones UNCAF / Copa Centroamericana
  - (gold) Champions (4): 1993, 1995, 2011, 2017
  - (silver) Runners-up (3): 1991, 2005, 2013
  - (bronze) Third place (2): 1999, 2009
- Central American and Caribbean Games
  - (silver) Silver medal (1): 1986
  - (bronze) Bronze medal (1): 1930

=== Friendly ===
- Lunar New Year Cup (1): 2002
- Copa Independencia (1): 2010

=== Summary ===
Including honours in competitions directly organized/recognized by FIFA or an affiliated confederation.

Competition	1st place, gold medalist(s)	2nd place, silver medalist(s)	3rd place, bronze medalist(s)	Total
CONCACAF Championship / Gold Cup	1	2	1	4
CONCACAF Nations League	0	0	1	1
CONMEBOL Copa América	0	0	1	1
CCCF Championship	0	1	4	5
Total	1	3	7	11

== FIFA World Ranking ==
Last update was on 30 March 2026 Source:

Best Ranking Worst Ranking Best Mover Worst Mover

Honduras' FIFA World Ranking History
Rank	Year	Best		Worst	
Rank	Year	Rank	Move	Rank	Move
65	2026	—	—	—	—
65	2025	64	▲9	75	▼1
75	2024	75	▲4	82	▼4
76	2023	76	▲2	81	▼1
81	2022	78	▲2	82	▼4
76	2021	63	▲4	76	▼8
64	2020	62	Steady	64	▼1
62	2019	61	▲4	67	▼6
62	2018	59	▲5	67	▼3
68	2017	65	▲10	75	▼3
75	2016	75	▲10	98	▼4
101	2015	72	▲5	101	▼8
71	2014	30	▲4	72	▼13
42	2013	34	▲12	59	▼7
58	2012	51	▲10	72	▼8
53	2011	38	▲17	57	▼7
59	2010	34	▲3	59	▼8
37	2009	35	▲7	46	▼7
40	2008	36	▲10	61	▼13
53	2007	52	▲7	63	▼8
56	2006	38	▲26	81	▼43
41	2005	39	▲11	59	▼4
59	2004	47	▲12	59	▼6
49	2003	37	▲3	49	▼5
40	2002	25	▲3	43	▼8
27	2001	20	▲25	51	▼4
46	2000	46	▲14	74	▼6
69	1999	69	▲14	80	▼2
91	1998	64	▲9	95	▼17
73	1997	45	▲5	73	▼8
45	1996	42	▲5	57	▼6
49	1995	49	▲20	71	▼20
53	1994	40	▲2	56	▼7
40	1993	39	▲2	41	▼1

== See also ==
- Football in Honduras
- Honduras national under-23 football team
- Honduras national under-20 football team
- Honduras national under-17 football team
- Clásico centroamericano
