= Jesse Tugbenyo =

German footballer

Personal information
- Full name: Jesse Edem Tugbenyo
- Date of birth: 6 July 2001 (age 25)
- Place of birth: Warstein, Germany
- Height: 1.87 m (6 ft 2 in)
- Position: Midfielder

Team information
- Current team: TSV Havelse
- Number: 33

Youth career
- –2015: SV SW Suttrop
- 2015–2018: SV Lippstadt
- 2018–2021: SC Paderborn

Senior career*
Years	Team	Apps	(Gls)
2019–2022	SC Paderborn II	32	(8)
2021–2022	SC Paderborn	1	(0)
2020–2021	→ Sportfreunde Lotte (loan)	19	(0)
2022–2023	SC Verl	17	(1)
2024–2026	MSV Duisburg	44	(1)
2026–	TSV Havelse	0	(0)
- * Club domestic league appearances and goals as of 14:35, 3 July 2026 (UTC)

Jesse Edem Tugbenyo (born 7 August 2001) is a German professional footballer who plays as a midfielder for TSV Havelse.

== Career ==
After playing several years at SC Paderborn II, he moved to SC Verl. In July 2024, he moved to MSV Duisburg. He joined TSV Havelse ahead of the 2026–27 season.

== Career statistics ==
As of 3 July 2026

Appearances and goals by club, season and competition
Club	Season	Division	League		Cup		Other		Total	
Club	Season	Division	Apps	Goals	Apps	Goals	Apps	Goals	Apps	Goals
SC Paderborn II	2019–20	Oberliga Westfalen	9	1	—		—		9	1
SC Paderborn II	2020–21	Oberliga Westfalen	4	0	—		—		4	0
SC Paderborn II	2021–22	Oberliga Westfalen	19	7	—		9 (Note: Appearances in promotion round)	4	28	11
SC Paderborn II	Total		32	8	—		9	4	41	12
Sportfreunde Lotte (loan)	2020–21	Regionalliga West	19	0	—		—		19	0
SC Paderborn	2022–23	2. Bundesliga	1	0	0	0	—		1	0
SC Verl	2022–23	3. Liga	17	1	—		—		17	1
MSV Duisburg	2024–25	Regionalliga West	22	0	—		—		22	0
MSV Duisburg	2025–26	3. Liga	22	1	—		—		22	1
MSV Duisburg	Total		44	1	—		—		44	1
TSV Havelse	2026–27	3. Liga	0	0	—		—		0	0
Career total			113	10	0	0	9	4	122	14
