= Clinton Bennett (footballer) =

Honduran footballer

Personal information
- Full name: Clinton Junior Bennett Zelaya
- Date of birth: 31 October 2002 (age 23)
- Place of birth: Coxen Hole, Roatán, Honduras
- Position: Centre-back

Team information
- Current team: C.D. Olimpia
- Number: 3

Senior career*
Years	Team	Apps	(Gls)
–2023	Juventus Roatan		
2025–	C.D. Olimpia	32	(3)

International career^{‡}
2026–	Honduras	1	(0)
- * Club domestic league appearances and goals as of 23:47, 2 July 2026 (UTC) ‡ National team caps and goals as of 23:47, 2 July 2026 (UTC)

Clinton Junior Benett Zelaya (born 31 October 2002) is a Honduran professional footballer who plays as a centre-back for C.D. Olimpia and the Honduras national team.

== Club career ==
Bennett was born in Coxen Hole on Roatán, one of Honduras' Bay Islands, on 31 October 2002. He played on the island for Juventus Roatan before signing for C.D. Olimpia, based in Tegucigalpa, in 2023, though it took until October 2025 for Bennett to make his first-team debut for the club.

== International career ==
Bennett made his international debut for Honduras on 6 June 2026, in a 2–0 friendly defeat to Argentina.
