= Noah Williams =

Noah Williams may refer to:

- Noah Williams (economist), American economist
- Noah Williams (diver) (born 2000), English athlete
- Noah Williams (basketball) (born 2001), American basketball player
- Noah Williams (sprinter) (born 1999), American sprinter
