= Noah Williams (basketball) =

American basketball player

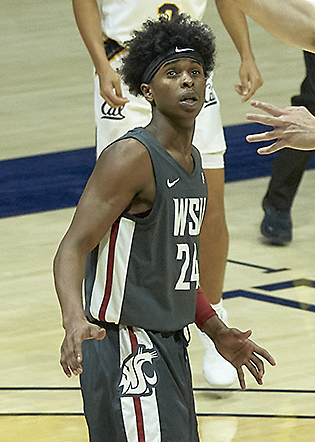
- Williams with Washington State in 2021

Personal information
- Born: February 28, 2001 (age 25) Seattle, Washington, U.S.
- Listed height: 6 ft 5 in (1.96 m)
- Listed weight: 195 lb (88 kg)

Career information
- High school: O'Dea (Seattle, Washington)
- College: Washington State (2019–2022); Washington (2022–2023); James Madison (2024–2025)
- NBA draft: 2025: undrafted
- Playing career: 2025–present
- Position: Shooting guard

Career history
- 2025: Leones ALMA de Managua

Noah Williams (born February 28, 2001) is an American basketball player. He played college basketball for the James Madison Dukes, Washington Huskies and Washington State Cougars. He is the son of former Washington State player Guy Williams.

== Early life ==
Williams was born and raised in Seattle, Washington and went to high school at the nearby O'Dea High School.

Williams originally committed to Buffalo under head coach Nate Oats on March 10, 2019. After Oats left Buffalo to accept the head coaching position at Alabama, Williams decommitted from Buffalo and committed to Washington State on May 7, 2019 over Buffalo, Virginia Tech, and Washington.

College recruiting
Name	Hometown	School	Height	Weight	Commit date
Noah Williams; G	Seattle, WA	O'Dea High School	6 ft 4 in (1.93 m)	174 lb (79 kg)	May 9, 2019
Noah Williams; G	Recruit ratings: Scout: Rivals: 247Sports: ESPN:				
Overall recruit ranking:
Note: In many cases, Scout, Rivals, 247Sports, On3, and ESPN may conflict in their listings of height and weight.; In these cases, the average was taken. ESPN grades are on a 100-point scale.; Sources: "2019 Washington State Commits". Rivals.; "Men's Basketball Recruiting". Scout.; "ESPN- Washington State Cougars Men's Basketball Recruiting". ESPN.; "Scout.com Team Recruiting Rankings". Scout.; "2019 Team Ranking". Rivals.

== College career ==
Williams played in 29 games, starting 13, and averaged 6.2 points and 21.7 minutes per game in his freshman season in 2019–20. He scored 15 points on his 19th birthday against Washington and a season-high 17 points against Oregon State for his best performances of the season.

During his sophomore season in 2020–21, Williams broke his career-high points several times. He broke it in back-to-back games, scoring 32 points in a win against California and scoring 40 points in a triple-overtime win against Stanford, marking the first time anyone from Washington State had scored 40 points since Klay Thompson scored 40 during the 2011 Pac-12 Conference Men's Basketball Tournament. Because of this scoring spree, Williams was honored as the NCAA National Player of the Week. For the season, he averaged 14.1 points and 30 minutes per game while starting all 27 games.

Coming off of his much-improved sophomore season, he averaged 9.5 points and 25.7 minutes per game in 35 games in 2021–22. He scored a season-high 19 points against both Winthrop and Oregon.

On April 11, 2022, Williams transferred from Washington State to rival Washington. He won the starting job to begin the 2022–23 season, but suffered a knee injury, had surgery and missed 12 games. He later missed the last 5 games of the season. He subsequently left the program and sat out the 2023–24 season.

In June 2024, Williams joined the James Madison Dukes for his final college season in 2024–25.

== Professional career ==
In September 2025, Williams joined Leones ALMA de Managua of the Liga Superior de Baloncesto in Nicaragua. In 12 games between September 22 and October 26, he averaged 14.4 points, 6.3 rebounds, 2.2 assists and 1.7 steals per game.

== Personal life ==
Prior to the start of his junior season, Williams was involved in an incident at a bar where he was trying to pick up a late evening food order. He was charged with Disorderly Conduct and Possession of Fictitious Identification. Both charges were dismissed after Noah completed 8 hours of community service.

== Career statistics ==
Legend
GP	Games played	GS	Games started	MPG	Minutes per game
FG%	Field goal percentage	3P%	3-point field goal percentage	FT%	Free throw percentage
RPG	Rebounds per game	APG	Assists per game	SPG	Steals per game
BPG	Blocks per game	PPG	Points per game	**Bold**	Career high

=== College ===
Year	Team	GP	GS	MPG	FG%	3P%	FT%	RPG	APG	SPG	BPG	PPG
2019–20	Washington State	29	13	21.7	.366	.148	.722	3.5	1.9	1.1	**.3**	6.2
2020–21	Washington State	27	**27**	**30.0**	**.406**	**.379**	**.804**	**3.6**	**2.7**	**1.6**	.2	**14.1**
2021–22	Washington State	**30**	25	25.7	.332	.262	.716	3.1	2.2	1.1	**.3**	9.5
2022–23	Washington	14	10	25.1	.375	.310	.613	3.1	1.9	.9	.1	8.7
Career		105	75	25.6	.369	.307	.734	3.3	2.2	1.2	.2	9.7
