= Eric Voufack =

German footballer

Personal information
- Full name: Eric Josef Arno Voufack
- Date of birth: 25 September 2001 (age 25)
- Height: 1.82 m (6 ft 0 in)
- Position: Right-back

Team information
- Current team: TSV Havelse (on loan from Kolding)
- Number: 19

Youth career
- –2016: Hallescher FC
- 2016–2020: Carl Zeiss Jena

Senior career*
Years	Team	Apps	(Gls)
2019–2021	Carl Zeiss Jena II	11	(1)
2020–2021	Carl Zeiss Jena	4	(0)
2021–2023	1. FC Lokomotive Leipzig	68	(6)
2023–2025	Rot-Weiss Essen	51	(1)
2025–	Kolding	13	(0)
2026–	→ TSV Havelse (loan)	0	(0)
- * Club domestic league appearances and goals as of 3 July 2026

Eric Josef Arno Voufack (born 25 September 2001) is a German professional footballer who plays as a right-back for TSV Havelse, on loan from Danish club Kolding.

== Career ==
On 19 June 2023, Voufack signed a two-year contract with Rot-Weiss Essen.

On 29 July 2025, Voufack joined Kolding in the Danish second tier on a three-year deal. He was loaned out to TSV Havelse for the 2026–27 season.

== Career statistics ==
As of 20 June 2020

Appearances and goals by club, season and competition
Club	Season	League			Cup		Other		Total	
Club	Season	Division	Apps	Goals	Apps	Goals	Apps	Goals	Apps	Goals
Carl Zeiss Jena II	2019–20	NOFV-Oberliga Süd	11	1	–		0	0	11	1
Carl Zeiss Jena	2019–20	3. Liga	1	0	0	0	0	0	1	0
Career total			12	1	0	0	0	0	12	1
