= Leonardo Posadas =

Honduran footballer (born 2008)

Personal information
- Full name: Leonardo García Posadas
- Date of birth: 1 January 2005 (age 21)
- Place of birth: Hamburg, Germany
- Height: 1.89 m (6 ft 2 in)
- Position: Midfielder

Team information
- Current team: TSV Havelse
- Number: 6

Youth career
- –2023: Hamburger SV
- 2023–2024: Borussia Dortmund

Senior career*
Years	Team	Apps	(Gls)
2022–2023	Hamburger SV II	1	(0)
2024–2025	Borussia Dortmund II	0	(0)
2025–2026	Hamburger SV II	41	(0)
2026–	TSV Havelse	0	(0)

International career^{‡}
2020	Germany U16	2	(0)
2021	Germany U17	5	(1)
2023	Germany U19	2	(0)
- * Club domestic league appearances and goals as of 1 July 2026 ‡ National team caps and goals as of 12 September 2023

Leonardo García Posadas (born 1 January 2005) is a professional footballer who plays as a midfielder for 3. Liga club TSV Havelse. Born in Germany, he has been called up to represent Honduras internationally.

== Early life ==
Posadas was born on 1 January 2005. Born in Hamburg, Germany, he was born to a Cuban father and a Honduran mother.

== Club career ==
As a youth player, Posadas joined the youth academy of German side Hamburger SV at the age of four and was promoted to the club's reserve team in 2022, where he made zero league appearances and scored zero goals.

Ahead of the 2023–24 season, he joined the youth academy of German Bundesliga side Borussia Dortmund and was promoted to the club's reserve team in 2024, where he made zero league appearances and scored zero goals. Following his stint there, he returned to the reserve team of German side Hamburger SV in 2025.

Posadas joined 3. Liga club TSV Havelse ahead of the 2026–27 season.

== International career ==
Posadas is a Germany youth international. During October 2021, he played for the Germany national under-17 football team for 2022 UEFA European Under-17 Championship qualification.

== Style of play ==
Posadas plays as a midfielder. Spanish news website Fútbol Centroamérica wrote in 2020 that "he is a versatile player who can excel as both a central defender and a midfielder".
