= Victor Vandenbroucke =

Honduran footballer (born 2008)

Personal information
- Date of birth: September 27, 2008 (age 18)
- Place of birth: Los Angeles, United States
- Position: Defender

Team information
- Current team: Jong AA Gent
- Number: 76

Youth career
- LAFC
- Jong AA Gent

Senior career*
Years	Team	Apps	(Gls)
2026–	Jong AA Gent	8	(1)
- * Club domestic league appearances and goals

Victor Vandenbroucke (born 27 September 2007) is a professional footballer who plays as a defender for Jong AA Gent. Born in the United States, he has been called up to represent Belgium and the United States internationally at youth level and Honduras internationally.

== Early life ==
Vandenbroucke was born on 27 September 2007. Born in the United States, he was born to a Honduran mother and an American father. His paternal grandparents were Belgian emigrants to the United States. At the age of ten, he moved with his family from the United States to Belgium.

== Career ==
As a youth player, Vandenbroucke joined the youth academy of American side LAFC. Following his stint here, he joined the youth academy of Belgian outfit Jong AA Gent at the age of ten where he captained the club's under-16 team.

During the winter of 2025, he signed his first professional contract with them. In 2026, he was promoted to their reserve team, where he wore the number seventy-six jersey. On 21 March 2026, he first started for them during a 3–2 home win over Club NXT in the league.

== Style of play ==
Vandenbroucke plays as a defender and is right-footed. Honduran newspaper Diario Diez wrote in 2026 that he is "a physical defender with good positioning and game awareness, capable of adapting to both center-back and right-back... solid in one-on-one situations, comfortable playing the ball out from the back, and with room for improvement in concentration and match fitness, qualities that fit well with the modern defender profile".
