= 2025–26 TSV 1860 Munich season =

TSV 1860 Munich
2025–26 season
- President: Robert Reisinger
- Head Coach: Patrick Glöckner (until 28 September); Alper Kayabunar (interim, 28 September - 9 October); Markus Kauczinski (from 9 October)
- Stadium: Grünwalder Stadion
- 3. Liga: 8th (Relegated)
- Bavarian Cup: Runners Up
- Top goalscorer: League: Sigurd Haugen (16); All: Sigurd Haugen (18)
- Highest home attendance: 15,000 (in all home matches)
| Home colours | Away colours | Third colours |

The 2025–26 season was the 127th season in the history of TSV 1860 Munich, and the club's Third consecutive season in 3. Liga. In addition to the domestic league, the team will participate in the Bavarian Cup.

== Season events ==
On 21 April, 1860 announced that they had re-signed Kevin Volland for the 2025–26 season.

On 5 May, 1860 announced that they had re-signed Kilian Jakob for the 2025–26 season.

On 12 May, 1860 announced that they had signed Florian Niederlechner for the 2025–26 season.

On 18 June, 1860 announced that Eliot Muteba had left the club after his contract was terminated early.

On 19 June, 1860 announced the signing of Justin Steinkötter from Steinbach Haiger.

On 21 June, 1860 announced the signing of Manuel Pfeifer from TSV Hartberg, and Siemen Voet from Slovan Bratislava.

On 23 June, 1860 announced the signing of Thomas Dähne from Holstein Kiel.

On 25 June, 1860 announced that they had failed to agree on a new contract with Julian Guttau, and that he would leave the club at the end of his contract on 30 June 2025. On the same day, 1860 announced the signing of Max Christiansen after his contract with Hannover 96 had expired.

On 5 July, 1860 announced the signing of Sigurd Haugen from AGF.

On 10 July, 1860 announced that Fabian Schubert had left the club by mutual agreement.

On 26 August, 1860 announced that Sōichirō Kōzuki had left the club after his contract was terminated by mutual agreement.

On 1 September, 1860 announced the signing of Marvin Rittmüller from Eintracht Braunschweig.

On 28 September, 1860 announced that Patrick Glöckner had been sacked as Head Coach of the club, with Alper Kayabunar being announced as the interim Head Coach the same day.

On 9 October, 1860 announced Markus Kauczinski as their new permanent Head Coach, with Markus Brzenska and Nico Masetzky joining as assistant coaches, Philipp Kunz as athletics coach, and René Vollath as goalkeeping coach.

On 29 January, 1860 announced that they had signed a new contract with Philipp Maier, until the summer of 2027.

On 8 March, 1860 announced that a clause in Patrick Hobsch's contract had been triggered, and his contract had been extended for the 2026–27 season.

On 10 April, 1860 announced that they had extended their contract with Thomas Dähne until the summer of 2028.

On 16 April, 1860 announced that they had extended their contract with Tunay Deniz until the summer of 2027.

Prior to their final home game of the season, 1860 announced that Xaver Kiefersauer and Paul Bachmann had extended their contracts with the club until the summer of 2028, and that Damjan Dordan had extended his contract until the summer of 2027. Additionally, 1860 announced that Thore Jacobsen, Clemens Lippmann, David Philipp, Miran Qela, Morris Schröter, Raphael Schifferl, Jesper Verlaat and Maximilian Wolfram were all leaving the club upon the expiry of their contracts at the end of the season.

On 3 June, 1860 confirmed that they had failed to receive a license from the German Football Association to compete in the 3. Liga, and therefore had been relegated to the Regionalliga Bayern.

== Squad ==
As of match played 23 May 2026

| No. | Name | Nationality | Position | Date of birth (age) | Signed from | Signed in | Contract ends | Apps. | Goals |
Goalkeepers
| 11 | René Vollath | (Germany) | GK | 20 March 1990 (aged 36) | SpVgg Unterhaching | 2024 | | 16 | 0 |
| 12 | Miran Qela | (Kosovo) | GK | 13 December 2006 (aged 19) | Academy | 2025 | | 0 | 0 |
| 21 | Thomas Dähne | (Germany) | GK | 4 January 1994 (aged 32) | Holstein Kiel | 2025 | 2028 | 39 | 0 |
| 40 | Paul Bachmann | (Germany) | GK | 19 July 2005 (aged 20) | Ismaning | 2024 | 2028 | 2 | 0 |
Defenders
| 3 | Siemen Voet | (Netherlands) | DF | 3 February 2000 (aged 26) | Slovan Bratislava | 2025 | | 39 | 0 |
| 4 | Jesper Verlaat | (Netherlands) | DF | 4 June 1996 (aged 29) | Waldhof Mannheim | 2022 | | 114 | 8 |
| 16 | Max Reinthaler | (Italy) | DF | 22 March 1995 (aged 31) | Wehen Wiesbaden | 2024 | | 58 | 6 |
| 18 | Kilian Jakob | (Germany) | DF | 25 January 1998 (aged 28) | Erzgebirge Aue | 2025 | | 24 | 2 |
| 25 | Sean Dulic | (Germany) | DF | 5 June 2005 (aged 20) | Academy | 2024 | 2026 | 46 | 1 |
| 27 | Manuel Pfeifer | (Austria) | DF | 10 September 1999 (aged 26) | TSV Hartberg | 2025 | | 19 | 0 |
| 29 | Marvin Rittmüller | (Germany) | DF | 7 March 1999 (aged 27) | Eintracht Braunschweig | 2025 | | 32 | 1 |
| 33 | Lasse Faßmann | (Germany) | DF | 6 June 2006 (aged 19) | Academy | 2025 | | 9 | 0 |
| 37 | Raphael Schifferl | (Austria) | DF | 29 July 1999 (aged 26) | Wolfsberger AC | 2024 | | 41 | 1 |
| 41 | Clemens Lippmann | (Austria) | DF | 29 June 2006 (aged 19) | Academy | 2023 | | 29 | 1 |
| 43 | Finn Fuchs | (Germany) | DF | 17 February 2006 (aged 20) | Academy | 2025 | | 1 | 0 |
Midfielders
| 2 | Tim Danhof | (Germany) | MF | 5 May 1997 (aged 29) | Erzgebirge Aue | 2024 | | 52 | 2 |
| 5 | Thore Jacobsen | (Germany) | MF | 19 April 1997 (aged 29) | SV Elversberg | 2024 | | 74 | 14 |
| 8 | David Philipp | (Germany) | MF | 10 April 2000 (aged 26) | Viktoria Köln | 2024 | | 67 | 7 |
| 13 | Max Christiansen | (Germany) | MF | 25 September 1996 (aged 29) | Hannover 96 | 2025 | | 19 | 3 |
| 17 | Morris Schröter | (Germany) | MF | 20 August 1995 (aged 30) | Hansa Rostock | 2023 | | 58 | 9 |
| 20 | Samuel Althaus | (Germany) | MF | 10 January 2006 (aged 20) | Academy | 2023 | | 14 | 2 |
| 23 | Damjan Dordan | (Bosnia and Herzegovina) | MF | 11 January 2003 (aged 23) | Academy | 2025 | 2027 | 12 | 0 |
| 26 | Philipp Maier | (Germany) | MF | 14 June 1994 (aged 31) | SSV Ulm 1846 | 2025 | 2027 | 39 | 2 |
| 35 | Xaver Kiefersauer | (Germany) | MF | 1 October 2005 (aged 20) | Academy | 2025 | 2028 | 4 | 0 |
| 36 | Tunay Deniz | (Germany) | MF | 2 February 1994 (aged 32) | Hallescher FC | 2024 | 2027 | 50 | 10 |
| 42 | Noah Klose | (Germany) | MF | 30 January 2005 (aged 21) | Academy | 2025 | | 1 | 0 |
| 44 | Loris Husic | (Austria) | MF | 17 January 2008 (aged 18) | Academy | 2025 | | 6 | 0 |
Forwards
| 7 | Florian Niederlechner | (Germany) | FW | 24 October 1990 (aged 35) | Hertha BSC | 2025 | | 30 | 3 |
| 9 | Justin Steinkötter | (Germany) | FW | 26 September 1999 (aged 26) | Steinbach Haiger | 2025 | | 28 | 2 |
| 19 | Emre Erdoğan | (Turkey) | FW | 24 February 2007 (aged 19) | Academy | 2025 | | 2 | 0 |
| 22 | Sigurd Haugen | (Norway) | FW | 17 July 1997 (aged 28) | AGF | 2025 | | 39 | 18 |
| 30 | Maximilian Wolfram | (Germany) | FW | 21 February 1997 (aged 29) | SC Verl | 2024 | | 63 | 13 |
| 31 | Kevin Volland | (Germany) | FW | 30 July 1992 (aged 33) | Union Berlin | 2025 | | 95 | 26 |
| 34 | Patrick Hobsch | (Germany) | FW | 10 October 1994 (aged 31) | SpVgg Unterhaching | 2024 | 2027 | 82 | 28 |
Out on loan
Left during the season
| 10 | Fabian Schubert | (Austria) | FW | 29 August 1994 (aged 31) | St. Gallen | 2024 | | 27 | 7 |
| 14 | Sōichirō Kōzuki | (Japan) | FW | 22 December 2000 (aged 25) | Schalke 04 | 2024 | | 36 | 3 |

== Transfers ==
=== In ===
| Date | Position | Nationality | Name | From | Fee | Ref. |
|---|---|---|---|---|---|---|
| 21 April 2025 (Note: Transfer announced on the shown date, becoming official on 1 July 2025.) | FW | (Germany) | Kevin Volland | Union Berlin | Free | |
| 5 May 2025 | DF | (Germany) | Kilian Jakob | Erzgebirge Aue | Free | |
| 12 May 2025 | FW | (Germany) | Florian Niederlechner | Hertha BSC | Free | |
| 19 June 2025 | FW | (Germany) | Justin Steinkötter | Steinbach Haiger | Undisclosed | |
| 21 June 2025 | DF | (Austria) | Manuel Pfeifer | TSV Hartberg | Undisclosed | |
| 21 June 2025 | DF | (Netherlands) | Siemen Voet | Slovan Bratislava | Undisclosed | |
| 23 June 2025 | GK | (Germany) | Thomas Dähne | Holstein Kiel | Undisclosed | |
| 25 June 2025 | MF | (Germany) | Max Christiansen | Hannover 96 | Free | |
| 5 July 2025 | FW | (Norway) | Sigurd Haugen | AGF | Undisclosed | |
| 1 September 2025 | DF | (Germany) | Marvin Rittmüller | Eintracht Braunschweig | Undisclosed | |

=== Out ===
| Date | Position | Nationality | Name | To | Fee | Ref. |
|---|---|---|---|---|---|---|
| 27 May 2025 | DF | (Germany) | Lukas Reich | Greuther Fürth | Undisclosed | |

=== Released ===
| Date | Position | Nationality | Name | Joined | Date | Ref |
|---|---|---|---|---|---|---|
| 18 June 2025 | FW | (Angola) | Eliot Muteba | Würzburger Kickers | 20 June 2025 | |
| 25 June 2025 | FW | (Germany) | Julian Guttau | Erzgebirge Aue | 14 July 2025 | |
| 30 June 2025 | DF | (Angola) | Anderson Lucoqui | Energie Cottbus | 1 September 2025 | |
| 10 July 2025 | FW | (Austria) | Fabian Schubert | ASK Voitsberg | 15 July 2025 | |
| 26 August 2025 | FW | (Japan) | Sōichirō Kōzuki | Viktoria Köln | 26 August 2025 | |
| 9 May 2026 (Note: Transfer announced on the shown date, becoming official on 30 June 2026.) | GK | (Kosovo) | Miran Qela | KF Llapi | 11 September 2026 | |
| 9 May 2026 | DF | (Austria) | Clemens Lippmann | Paderborn 07 | 29 May 2026 (Note: Transfer announced on the shown date, becoming official on 1 July 2026.) | |
| 9 May 2026 | DF | (Austria) | Raphael Schifferl | Haugesund | 10 September 2026 | |
| 9 May 2026 | DF | (Netherlands) | Jesper Verlaat | Borussia Dortmund II | 19 June 2026 | |
| 9 May 2026 | MF | (Germany) | Thore Jacobsen | | | |
| 9 May 2026 | MF | (Germany) | David Philipp | Jahn Regensburg | 19 May 2026 | |
| 9 May 2026 | MF | (Germany) | Morris Schröter | FSV Zwickau | 23 October 2026 | |
| 9 May 2026 | FW | (Germany) | Maximilian Wolfram | Kickers Offenbach | 9 July 2026 | |
| 17 June 2026 | DF | (Germany) | Sean Dulic | 1899 Hoffenheim | 1 July 2026 | |
| 26 June 2026 | DF | (Netherlands) | Siemen Voet | 1. Saarbrücken | 1 July 2026 | |
| 30 June 2026 | GK | (Germany) | Thomas Dähne | 1. Heidenheim | 15 July 2026 | |
| 30 June 2026 | GK | (Germany) | René Vollath | | | |
| 30 June 2026 | DF | (Austria) | Manuel Pfeifer | TSV Hartberg | 25 August 2026 | |
| 30 June 2026 | DF | (Germany) | Finn Fuchs | Borussia Dortmund II | | |
| 30 June 2026 | DF | (Germany) | Kilian Jakob | Viktoria Köln | 23 July 2026 | |
| 30 June 2026 | DF | (Germany) | Marvin Rittmüller | Stal Rzeszów | 22 July 2026 | |
| 30 June 2026 | DF | (Italy) | Max Reinthaler | | | |
| 30 June 2026 | MF | (Germany) | Max Christiansen | SV Sandhausen | 28 August 2026 | |
| 30 June 2026 | MF | (Germany) | Tim Danhof | | | |
| 30 June 2026 | MF | (Germany) | Xaver Kiefersauer | 1. Nürnberg | 16 July 2026 | |
| 30 June 2026 | MF | (Germany) | Philipp Maier | Preußen Münster | 3 September 2026 | |
| 30 June 2026 | FW | (Germany) | Patrick Hobsch | Jahn Regensburg | 16 July 2026 | |
| 30 June 2026 | FW | (Germany) | Justin Steinkötter | SGV Freiberg | 21 July 2026 | |
| 30 June 2026 | FW | (Norway) | Sigurd Haugen | 1. Nürnberg | 1 July 2026 | |

== Friendlies ==
| 28 June 2025 | TSV 1862 Grafenau | 0–10 | 1860 Munich | Galgenau |
| 14:00 CEST (UTC+2) | | Report | Volland 10'; Voet 48', 89'; Pfeifer 52'; Deniz 56'; Dulic 66'; Hobsch 70', 84'; Wolfram 77'; Philipp 85' | Stadium: Kanuf Sportpark; Attendance: 1,750; Referee: Michael Freund |

| 29 June 2025 | TSV Weyarn | 0–15 | 1860 Munich | Weyarn |
| 14:00 CEST (UTC+2) | | Report | Volland 7'; Pfeifer 11'; Lippmann 13'; Erdoğan 35'; Christiansen 41'; Hobsch 43'; Kōzuki 61', 65', 82'; Niederlechner 63'; Philipp 74'; Danhof 76'; Reinthaler 79'; Deniz 85', 86' | Stadium: Sportpark Weyarn; Attendance: 2,060; Referee: Felix Wolf |

| 4 July 2025 | Eintracht Bamberg | 0–5 | 1860 Munich | Bamberg |
| 18:00 CEST (UTC+2) | Niederlechner 13', 38'; Deniz 17' (pen.); Volland 61'; Danhof 86' (yellow card) | Report | | Stadium: Fuchs-Park-Stadion; Attendance: 3,517; Referee: Markus Pflaum |

| 8 July 2025 | Artis Brno | – | 1860 Munich | Oepping, Austria |
| 11:00 CEST (UTC+2) | | | | Stadium: Oepping Sports Park |
Note: Match cancelled due to bad weather.

| 8 July 2025 | 1860 Munich | 5–0 | SV Ried | Putzleinsdorf, Austria |
| 18:30 CEST (UTC+2) | Kōzuki 52'; Hobsch 57', 68', 90'; Danhof 88' (yellow card); Pfeifer (yellow card); Schifferl (yellow card) | Report | Havenaar (yellow card); Wernitznig (yellow card) | Stadium: Sportzentrum 1 Attendance: 1,860; Referee: Andreas Feichtinger |

| 11 July 2025 | 1860 Munich | 1–0 | SKU Amstetten | Ulrichsberg, Austria |
| 11:00 CEST (UTC+2) | Philipp 21'; Vollath (yellow card); Deniz (yellow card) | Report | Offenthaler (yellow card) | Stadium: Dreihans Arena Ulrichsberg; Attendance: 551; Referee: Asim Basic |

| 11 July 2025 | 1860 Munich | 0–1 | Slovan Liberec | Ulrichsberg, Austria |
| 17:00 CEST (UTC+2) | | Report | D.Mašek | Stadium: Dreihans Arena Ulrichsberg; Attendance: 700; Referee: René Kettlgruber |

| 19 July 2025 | Vaduz | 0–1 | 1860 Munich | Chur, Switzerland |
| 16:00 CEST (UTC+2) | Navarro (yellow card) | Report | Nederlechner 32'; Haugen (yellow card) | Stadium: Obere Au Stadium; Attendance: 1,185; Referee: Jonatha Jaussi |

| 26 July 2025 | Jahn Regensburg | 0–4 | 1860 Munich | Regensburg |
| 16:00 CEST (UTC+2) | | Report | Volland 26', 38'; Verlaat 67'; Kōzuki 90'; Deniz (yellow card) | Stadium: Jahnstadion Regensburg; Attendance: 9,270; Referee: Fabian Buechner |

| 18 November 2025 | 1. FC Passau | 2–14 | 1860 Munich | Passau |
| 18:00 CET (UTC+1) | Steinleitner 31'; Moser 33' | Report | Haugen 7', 14'; Hobsch 9', 18', 43', 45'; Maier 20', 26'; Niederlechner 48', 54', 85'; Lippmann 52'; Steinkötter 87' (pen.); Philipp 89' | Stadium: Dreiflüssestadion; Attendance: 1,860; Referee: Alexander Schuster |

| 9 January 2026 | 1860 Munich | 4–1 | Winterthur | Belek, Turkey |
| 15:00 CET (UTC+1) | Philipp 1'; Hobsch 20'; Volland 61'; Wolfram 108' | Report | Hunziker 15' | Stadium: Susesi Sports Centre; Attendance: 200; Referee: Resul Dede |
Note: Match consisted of three 45-minute periods.

== Competitions ==
=== Overall record ===
| Competition | First match | Last match | Starting round | Final position | Record | | | | | | | |
| Competition | First match | Last match | Starting round | Final position | Pld | W | D | L | GF | GA | GD | Win % |
|---|---|---|---|---|---|---|---|---|---|---|---|---|
| 3. Liga | 1 August 2025 | 16 May 2026 | Matchday 1 | 8th | 38 | 15 | 11 | 12 | 54 | 53 | +1 | 39.47 |
| Bavarian Cup | 22 July 2025 | 23 May 2026 | First Round | Runnersup | 6 | 5 | 1 | 0 | 23 | 2 | +21 | 83.33 |
| Total | | | | | 44 | 20 | 12 | 12 | 77 | 55 | +22 | 45.45 |

Last updated: 23 May 2026
Source: Competitions

=== 3. Liga ===
==== League table ====
| Pos | Team | Pld | W | D | L | GF | GA | GD | Pts | Promotion, qualification or relegation |
|---|---|---|---|---|---|---|---|---|---|---|
| 6 | SC Verl | 38 | 18 | 10 | 10 | 82 | 48 | +34 | 64 | |
| 7 | Alemannia Aachen | 38 | 19 | 7 | 12 | 76 | 57 | +19 | 64 | |
| 8 | 1860 Munich (Note: 1860 Munich originally finished the season in eighth place, but were administratively relegated to the Regionalliga Bayern after failing to obtain a license for the upcoming 3. Liga season, sparing TSV Havelse from relegation.) (R) | 38 | 15 | 11 | 12 | 54 | 53 | +1 | 56 | Relegation to Regionalliga |
| 9 | Wehen Wiesbaden | 38 | 15 | 8 | 15 | 54 | 52 | +2 | 53 | |
| 10 | Waldhof Mannheim | 38 | 15 | 7 | 16 | 59 | 72 | −13 | 52 | |

Source: DFB
Rules for classification: 1) Points; 2) Goal difference; 3) Goals scored; 4) Head-to-head results; 5) Head-to-head away goals scored; 6) Away goals scored; 7) Play-off.
(R) Relegated

==== Results summary ====
| Overall | | | | | | | | Home | | | | | | Away | | | | | |
| Pld | W | D | L | GF | GA | GD | Pts | W | D | L | GF | GA | GD | W | D | L | GF | GA | GD |
|---|---|---|---|---|---|---|---|---|---|---|---|---|---|---|---|---|---|---|---|
| 38 | 15 | 11 | 12 | 54 | 53 | +1 | 56 | 9 | 7 | 2 | 34 | 24 | +10 | 6 | 4 | 10 | 20 | 29 | −9 |

Last updated: 16 May 2026.
Source: DFB

==== Results by round ====
| Round | 1 | 2 | 3 | 4 | 5 | 6 | 7 | 8 | 9 | 10 | 11 | 12 | 13 | 14 | 15 | 16 | 17 | 18 | 19 | 20 | 21 | 22 | 23 | 24 | 25 | 26 | 27 | 28 | 29 | 30 | 31 | 32 | 33 | 34 | 35 | 36 | 37 | 38 |
|---|---|---|---|---|---|---|---|---|---|---|---|---|---|---|---|---|---|---|---|---|---|---|---|---|---|---|---|---|---|---|---|---|---|---|---|---|---|---|
| Ground | A | H | A | H | H | A | H | A | H | A | H | A | H | A | H | A | H | A | H | H | A | H | A | A | H | A | H | A | H | A | H | A | H | A | H | A | H | A |
| Result | D | W | W | D | W | L | L | L | D | L | W | L | W | L | W | W | W | W | L | D | D | D | L | W | W | W | W | W | D | L | D | L | D | D | W | D | L | L |
| Position | 10 | 4 | 3 | 3 | 2 | 4 | 10 | 10 | 12 | 13 | 12 | 14 | 13 | 14 | 11 | 10 | 9 | 7 | 8 | 9 | 8 | 8 | 9 | 8 | 8 | 8 | 7 | 6 | 7 | 7 | 7 | 7 | 8 | 8 | 8 | 8 | 8 | 8 |

Updated to match(es) played on 16 May 2026. Source: DFB
A = Away; H = Home; W = Win; D = Draw; L = Loss

==== Matches ====
| 1 August 2025 1 | Rot-Weiss Essen | 1–1 | 1860 Munich | Essen |
| 18:00 CEST (UTC+2) | Alonso 6'; Kraulich (yellow card) 29'; Arslan (yellow card) 56'; Mizuta (yellow card) 58'; Bouebari (yellow card) 65' | Report | Danhof (yellow card) 40'; Niederlechner 68' | Stadium: Stadion an der Hafenstraße; Attendance: 19,300; Referee: Felix Weller |

| 9 August 2025 2 | 1860 Munich | 3–1 | VfL Osnabrück | Munich |
| 14:00 CEST (UTC+2) | Jacobsen (yellow card) 2'; Volland 10' (yellow card) 27'; Niederlechner 41'; Haugen 52'; Verlaat (yellow card) 59' Voet (yellow card) 69' | Report | Karademir (yellow card) 10'; Kammerbauer 75'; Müller (yellow card) 90+6' | Stadium: Grünwalder Stadion; Attendance: 15,000; Referee: Timo Gerach |

| 23 August 2025 3 | Alemannia Aachen | 0–2 | 1860 Munich | Aachen |
| 14:00 CEST (UTC+2) | Gaudino (yellow card) 39' (yellow-red card) 64'; Lorch (yellow card) 69'; Wiebe (yellow card) 73'; Ademi (yellow card) 85'; Elekwa (yellow card) 90+2' | Report | Deniz (yellow card) 42'; Niederlechner (yellow card) 56'; Verlaat (yellow card) 56'; Hobsch 89' Philipp 90+1' | Stadium: New Tivoli; Referee: Robert Kampka |

| 30 August 2025 4 | 1860 Munich | 1–1 | VfB Stuttgart II | Munich |
| 14:00 CEST (UTC+2) | Jacobsen (yellow card) 24'; Niederlechner (yellow card) 31'; Volland (yellow card) 33'; Deniz (yellow card) 45+2'; Verlaat (yellow card) 90'; Haugen 90+7' | Report | Catovic 25'; Di Benedetto (yellow card) 33'; Groiß (yellow card) 44' | Stadium: Grünwalder Stadion; Attendance: 15,000; Referee: Cengiz Kabalakli |

| 14 September 2025 5 | 1860 Munich | 3–2 | TSV Havelse | Munich |
| 19:30 CEST (UTC+2) | Volland 39' (yellow card) 39' (yellow-red card) 84'; Haugen 45'; Hobsch 90+5' | Report | Müller (yellow card) 35'; Plume (yellow card) 43'; Kolgeci (yellow card) 51'; Niederlechner 58' (o.g.); Posselt 88' (yellow card) 89' | Stadium: Grünwalder Stadion; Attendance: 15,000; Referee: Michael Näther |

| 17 September 2025 6 | Hansa Rostock | 2–1 | 1860 Munich | Rostock |
| 19:00 CEST (UTC+2) | Dietze 31' (yellow card) 45+2'; Krauß 34' | Report | Voet (yellow card) 6'; Verlaat (yellow card) 7'; Haugen (yellow card) 13'; Steinkötter (yellow card) 63'; Rittmüller (yellow card) 66'; Deniz (yellow card) 84'; Dulic 89' | Stadium: Ostseestadion; Attendance: 24,303; Referee: Felix Prigan |

| 20 September 2025 7 | 1860 Munich | 1–5 | TSG Hoffenheim II | Munich |
| 16:30 CEST (UTC+2) | Pfeifer (yellow card) 26'; Philipp 72' (yellow card) 76'; Volland (yellow card) 82' | Report | Hör (yellow card) 22'; Amaimouni-Echghouyab 39', 45+1'; Hennrich 56', 69'; Labes 80' | Stadium: Grünwalder Stadion; Attendance: 15,000; Referee: Cristian Ballweg |

| 27 September 2025 8 | Erzgebirge Aue | 2–0 | 1860 Munich | Aue-Bad Schlema |
| 14:00 CEST (UTC+2) | Stefaniak 20'; Fabisch (yellow card) 35'; Fallmann (yellow card) 53'; Uhlmann 82' | Report | Deniz (yellow card) 42'; Pfeifer (yellow card) 84' | Stadium: Eins Erzgebirgsstadion; Attendance: 10,187; Referee: Luca Jürgensen |

| 1 October 2025 9 | 1860 Munich | 2–2 | Viktoria Köln | Munich |
| 19:00 CEST (UTC+2) | Christiansen 41'; Hobsch 52'; Philipp (yellow card) 90' | Report | Lobinger 4' (pen.); Otto 8'; Dietz (yellow card) 22' (yellow-red card) 36'; Sponsel (yellow card) 85' | Stadium: Grünwalder Stadion; Attendance: 15,000; Referee: Lukas Benen |

| 5 October 2025 10 | Wehen Wiesbaden | 1–0 | 1860 Munich | Wiesbaden |
| 16:30 CEST (UTC+2) | Flotho 87'; May (yellow card) 90+3' | Report | Rittmüller (yellow card) 34'; Philipp (yellow card) 48' | Stadium: Brita-Arena; Attendance: 4,812; Referee: Timon Schulz |

| 19 October 2025 11 | 1860 Munich | 3–1 | MSV Duisburg | Munich |
| 16:30 CEST (UTC+2) | Deniz (yellow card) 14'; Haugen 41', 78'; Jacobsen 90+4' | Report | Sussek (yellow card) 39'; Bitter 42'; Töpken (yellow card) 90+2' | Stadium: Grünwalder Stadion; Attendance: 15,000; Referee: Martin Wilke |

| 25 October 2025 12 | Waldhof Mannheim | 3–1 | 1860 Munich | Mannheim |
| 14:00 CEST (UTC+2) | Abifade 24'; Sietan (yellow card) 45+1'; Okpala 60', 66' | Report | Hobsch (yellow card) 7'; Christiansen 10' (yellow card) 17'; Niederlechner (yellow card) 62'; Voet (yellow card) 75' | Stadium: Carl-Benz-Stadion; Attendance: 15,912; Referee: Felix Wagner |

| 1 November 2025 13 | 1860 Munich | 3–0 | Energie Cottbus | Munich |
| 14:00 CET (UTC+1) | Dulic (yellow card) 24'; Jacobsen 39' (pen.), 45+4'; Voet (yellow card) 55'; Manu 82' (o.g.) | Report | Michelbrink (yellow card) 6'; Engelhardt (yellow card) 37' | Stadium: Grünwalder Stadion; Attendance: 15,000; Referee: Konrad Oldhafer |

| 9 November 2025 14 | Jahn Regensburg | 4–0 | 1860 Munich | Regensburg |
| 16:30 CET (UTC+1) | Hottmann (yellow card) 14' Hermes 32'; Wurm 75'; Eichinger 80' (pen.); Müller 85' | Report | Volland (yellow card) 38'; Maier (yellow card) 88' | Stadium: Jahnstadion Regensburg; Attendance: 15,210; Referee: Robert Schröder |

| 23 November 2025 15 | 1860 Munich | 2–0 | 1. FC Saarbrücken | Munich |
| 13:30 CET (UTC+1) | Hobsch 13'; Jacobsen 90+1' (pen.) | Report | Krahn (yellow card) 55'; Wilhelm (yellow card) 59' | Stadium: Grünwalder Stadion; Attendance: 15,000; Referee: Felix Weller |

| 29 November 2025 16 | SSV Ulm | 0–1 | 1860 Munich | Ulm |
| 14:00 CET (UTC+1) | Scholze (yellow card) 56'; Löder (yellow card) 86' | Report | Haugen 1'; Philipp (yellow card) 89' | Stadium: Donaustadion; Attendance: 16,159; Referee: Leonidas Exuzidis |

| 6 December 2025 17 | 1860 Munich | 3–1 | Schweinfurt 05 | Munich |
| 16:30 CET (UTC+1) | Doktorczyk 33' (o.g.); Meißner 57' (o.g.); Rittmüller 69' | Report | Tranziska 45+2' (yellow card) 73'; Geis (yellow card) 66' | Stadium: Grünwalder Stadion; Attendance: 15,000; Referee: Lennart Kernchen |

| 13 December 2025 18 | Ingolstadt 04 | 1–2 | 1860 Munich | Ingolstadt |
| 14:00 CET (UTC+1) | Kaygin 20' (yellow card) 41'; Fröde (yellow card) 81'; Öztürk (yellow card) 90+11' | Report | Voet (yellow card) 17'; Volland (yellow card) 23' (yellow-red card) 68'; Haugen 42' (yellow card) 81'; Hobsch 58'; Maier (yellow card) 71'; Rittmüller (yellow card) 90'; Jakob (yellow card) 90+10' | Stadium: Audi Sportpark; Attendance: 13,292; Referee: Florian Lechner |

| 20 December 2025 19 | 1860 Munich | 0–2 | SC Verl | Munich |
| 15:30 CET (UTC+1) | Jacobsen (yellow card) 16' (yellow-red card) 55'; Reinthaler (yellow card) 45'; Maier (yellow card) 80' | Report | Mhamdi 12' (yellow card) 53'; Besio 76'; F.Otto (yellow card) 88'; Ens (yellow card) 90+4' | Stadium: Grünwalder Stadion; Attendance: 15,000; Referee: Fabienne Michel |

| 17 January 2026 20 | 1860 Munich | 1–1 | Rot-Weiss Essen | Munich |
| CET (UTC+1) | Schifferl (yellow card) 40'; Hobsch (yellow card) 45+1'; Reinthaler 90' | Report | Schultz (yellow card) 45+1'; Kostka (yellow card) 70'; Brumme (yellow card) 75'; Obuz 82'; Hüning (yellow card) 90+1' | Stadium: Grünwalder Stadion; Attendance: 15,000; Referee: Felix Weller |

| 25 January 2026 21 | VfL Osnabrück | 1–1 | 1860 Munich | Osnabrück |
| 16:30 CET (UTC+1) | Jacobsen 17'; Henning (yellow card) 42' | Report | Volland 25'; Reinthaler (yellow card) 50'; Voet (yellow card) 90+2' | Stadium: Stadion an der Bremer Brücke; Attendance: 15,369; Referee: Nico Fuchs |

| 31 January 2026 22 | 1860 Munich | 2–2 | Alemannia Aachen | Munich |
| 14:00 CET (UTC+1) | Maier (yellow card) 17' (goal) 22'; Jakob (yellow card) 28'; Jacobsen 54' (pen.); Dordan (yellow card) 90+1' | Report | Gindorf 18' (pen.) (yellow card) 32'; Pseftis (yellow card) 53'; Schroers 61'; Wiebe (yellow card) 82'; Wriedt (yellow card) 90+2' | Stadium: Grünwalder Stadion; Attendance: 15,000; Referee: Martin Wilke |

| 7 February 2026 23 | VfB Stuttgart II | 2–1 | 1860 Munich | Aspach |
| 16:30 CET (UTC+1) | Groiß (yellow card) 15'; Darvich 20'; Diehl 26'; Olivier (yellow card) 74'; Lüers (yellow card) 86'; Hellstern (yellow card) 90+5' | Report | Jacobsen (yellow card) 17'; Husic (yellow card) 24'; Haugen (yellow card) 50' (goal) 85'; Volland (yellow card) 78'; Niederlechner (yellow card) 90+1' | Stadium: WIRmachenDRUCK Arena; Attendance: 4,500; Referee: Yannick Rupert |

| 14 February 2026 24 | TSV Havelse | 0–5 | 1860 Munich | Hanover |
| 14:00 CET (UTC+1) | | Report | Jacobsen (yellow card) 14'; Haugen 29'; Hobsch 53'; Lippmann 60'; Steinkötter 83'; Maier 88' | Stadium: Eilenriedestadion; Attendance: 1,912; Referee: Fabienne Michel |

| 22 February 2026 25 | 1860 Munich | 1–0 | Hansa Rostock | Munich |
| 13:30 CET (UTC+1) | Jacobsen 48' (pen.); Voet (yellow card) 56' | Report | Voglsammer (yellow card) 22'; Kinsombi (yellow card) 46' | Stadium: Grünwalder Stadion; Attendance: 15,000; Referee: Luca Jürgensen |

| 27 February 2026 26 | TSG Hoffenheim II | 1–2 | 1860 Munich | Hoffenheim |
| 19:00 CET (UTC+1) | Micheler (yellow card) 22' (goal) 25'; Zeitler (yellow card) 45'; Erlein (red card) 50'; Lührs (yellow card) 72'; Engelns (yellow card) 74' | Report | Philipp 2' (yellow card) 62'; Haugen 63'; Maier (yellow card) 71'; Steinkötter (yellow card) 90+2' | Stadium: Dietmar-Hopp-Stadion; Attendance: 3,917; Referee: Jonah Besong |

| 3 March 2026 27 | 1860 Munich | 2–1 | Erzgebirge Aue | Munich |
| 19:00 CET (UTC+1) | Wolfram 7'; Reinthaler (yellow card) 30'; Haugen 50' | Report | Bär 12'; Günther-Schmidt (yellow card) 20'; Collins (yellow card) 25'; Malone (yellow card) 62'; Fallmann (yellow card) 90+2' | Stadium: Grünwalder Stadion; Attendance: 15,000; Referee: Tom Bauer |

| 6 March 2026 28 | Viktoria Köln | 0–1 | 1860 Munich | Cologne |
| 19:00 CET (UTC+1) | Velasco (yellow card) 61'; Münst (yellow card) 73'; Boboy (yellow card) 77'; Sachse (yellow card) 89'; Tonye (yellow card) 90+2' | Report | Haugen (yellow card) 5'; Volland 38' (yellow card) 40'; Jacobsen (yellow card) 56'; Reinthaler (yellow card) 75' | Stadium: Sportpark Höhenberg; Referee: Justin Hasmann |

| 14 March 2026 29 | 1860 Munich | 0–0 | Wehen Wiesbaden | Munich |
| 16:30 CET (UTC+1) | Philipp (yellow card) 90+1' | Report | Greilinger (yellow card) 48' | Stadium: Grünwalder Stadion; Attendance: 15,000; Referee: Sebastian Hilsberg |

| 22 March 2026 30 | MSV Duisburg | 2–1 | 1860 Munich | Duisburg |
| 16:30 CEST (UTC+2) | Bitter 60'; Casar (yellow card) 88'; Töpken 90' | Report | Jacobsen 69' (pen.) (yellow card) 88' (yellow-red card) 90+4'; Danhof (yellow card) 83'; Dähne (yellow card) 90+5' | Stadium: MSV-Arena; Attendance: 24,394; Referee: Richard Hempel |

| 4 April 2026 31 | 1860 Munich | 1–1 | Waldhof Mannheim | Munich |
| 14:00 CEST (UTC+2) | Volland (yellow card) 42'; Haugen 86' | Report | Asallari (yellow card) 23'; Bierschenk 27'; Rieckmann (yellow card) 63'; Masca (yellow card) 90+1'; Nijhuis (yellow card) 90+2' | Stadium: Grünwalder Stadion; Attendance: 15,000; Referee: Jarno Wienefeld |

| 7 April 2026 32 | Energie Cottbus | 3–0 | 1860 Munich | Cottbus |
| 19:00 CEST (UTC+2) | Engelhardt 29', 33', 66' (yellow card) 44' | Report | Schifferl (yellow card) 26'; Althaus (yellow card) 75' | Stadium: Stadion der Freundschaft; Attendance: 16,273; Referee: Florian Lechner |

| 12 April 2026 33 | 1860 Munich | 2–2 | Jahn Regensburg | Munich |
| 19:30 CEST (UTC+2) | Haugen 28', 81'; Faßmann (yellow card) 87' | Report | Mätzler 42'; Müller 45+1' (yellow card) 83'; Gebhardt (yellow card) 54'; Saller (yellow card) 90+2' | Stadium: Grünwalder Stadion; Attendance: 15,000; Referee: Daniel Bartnitzki |

| 18 April 2026 34 | 1. FC Saarbrücken | 0–0 | 1860 Munich | Saarbrücken |
| 14:00 CEST (UTC+2) | Fahrner (yellow card) 71' | Report | Althaus (yellow card) 33'; Volland (yellow card) 57'; Pfeifer (yellow card) 90+6' | Stadium: Ludwigsparkstadion; Attendance: 14,744; Referee: Cristian Ballweg |

| 25 April 2026 35 | 1860 Munich | 3–2 | SSV Ulm | Munich |
| 14:00 CEST (UTC+2) | Volland (yellow card) 72'; Danhof 74' (yellow card) 90+5'; Haugen 77'; Niederlechner 84' (yellow card) 86' | Report | Vukancic (yellow card) 29' (yellow-red card) 80'; Röser (yellow card) 52'; Bazzoli (yellow card) 72'; Löder 83'; Brown 90+2' | Stadium: Grünwalder Stadion; Attendance: 15,000; Referee: Nico Fuchs |

| 2 May 2026 36 | Schweinfurt 05 | 1–1 | 1860 Munich | Schweinfurt |
| 14:00 CEST (UTC+2) | Müller 27'; Vakouftsis (yellow card) 49'; Grimbs (yellow card) 53'; Trslic (yellow card) 86' | Report | Haugen 31'; Niederlechner (yellow card) 35'; Jacobsen (yellow card) 79' | Stadium: Sachs-Stadion; Attendance: 9,036; Referee: Timon Schulz |

| 9 May 2026 37 | 1860 Munich | 1–2 | Ingolstadt 04 | Munich |
| 14:00 CEST (UTC+2) | Althaus 42'; Dulic (yellow card) 76'; Voet (yellow card) 81' | Report | Costly 57'; Besuschkow 64' | Stadium: Grünwalder Stadion; Attendance: 15,000; Referee: Yannick Rupert |

| 16 May 2026 38 | SC Verl | 3–0 | 1860 Munich | Verl |
| 13:30 CEST (UTC+2) | Taz 36' (yellow card) 77'; Mhamdi 60'; Stark 78' | Report | Jakob (yellow card) 54'; Dulic (yellow card) 89' | Stadium: Sportclub Arena; Attendance: 3,764; Referee: Martin Wilke |

=== Bavarian Cup ===
| 22 July 2025 First Round | SC Reichmannsdorf | 0–6 | 1860 Munich | Schlüsselfeld |
| 18:30 CEST (UTC+2) | Lorz (yellow card) 77' | Report | Hobsch 11', 19'; Wolfram 16' (penalty missed) 45+1'; Schröter 26' (pen.); Deniz 39'; Althaus 84' | Stadium: Sportgelände SC Reichmannsdorf; Attendance: 2,700; Referee: David Wagner |

| 12 August 2025 Second Round | TSV Geiselbullach | 0–8 | 1860 Munich | Olching |
| 18:00 CEST (UTC+2) | Frank (yellow card) 57' | Report | Christiansen 5'; Hobsch 14', 31', 51', 71'; Schifferl 53' (yellow card) 65'; Steinkötter 67'; Maier (yellow card) 90+2'; Wolfram 90+3' | Stadium: Sportanlage Schulstraße; Attendance: Marco Blösch; Referee: 1,750 |

| 6 September 2025 Third Round | FV Illertissen | 1–3 | 1860 Munich | Illertissen |
| 14:00 CEST (UTC+2) | Embaye (yellow card) 32'; Neuberger (yellow card) 61'; Hausmann 75' | Report | Reinthaler 19'; Philipp 65'; Wolfram (yellow card) 73'; Jacobsen 88' (pen.) | Stadium: Voehlin-Stadium; Attendance: 3,484; Referee: Johannes Wagner |

| 12 November 2025 Quarter-Finals | TSV Aubstadt | 0–4 | 1860 Munich | Aubstadt |
| 18:30 CET (UTC+1) | Volkmuth (yellow card) 67'; Behr (yellow card) 69' | Report | Jacobsen (yellow card) 27' (goal) 48'; Volland 35'; Maier 52'; Wolfram 88' | Stadium: NGN-Arena; Attendance: 2,431; Referee: Johannes Hamper |

| 28 March 2026 Semi-Finals | Jahn Regensburg | 0–1 | 1860 Munich | Regensburg |
| 14:00 CET (UTC+1) | Saller (yellow card) 45'; Bauer (yellow card) 72'; Seidel (yellow card) 90+5' | Report | Jacobsen (yellow card) 11'; Voet (yellow card) 35'; Haugen 54'; Niederlechner (yellow card) 90'; Reinthaler (yellow card) 90+5' | Stadium: Jahnstadion Regensburg; Attendance: 14,089; Referee: Andreas Hummel |

| 23 May 2026 Final | Würzburger Kickers | 1–1 (4–2 p) | 1860 Munich | Würzburg |
| 16:30 CEST (UTC+2) | Ochs (yellow card) 15'; Muteba (yellow card) 86'; Bonga 90+1' | Report | Haugen 38'; Steinkötter (yellow card) 44'; Dulic (yellow card) 82' | Stadium: Akon Arena; Attendance: 11,017; Referee: Christopher Knauer |
| | Penalties |
| | Bonga (penalty scored); Cisse (penalty scored); Omore (penalty scored); Thomann (penalty scored) | | (penalty scored) Haugen; (penalty scored) Rittmüller; (penalty missed) Hobsch; (penalty missed) Jakob |

== Squad statistics ==
=== Appearances and goals ===
As of match played 23 May 2026

Players with no appearances are not included on the list
Italics indicate a loaned in player

| No. | Pos | Nat | Player | Total | | 3. Liga | | Bavarian Cup | |
| No. | Pos | Nat | Player | Apps | Goals | Apps | Goals | Apps | Goals |
|---|---|---|---|---|---|---|---|---|---|
| 2 | DF | (Germany) GER | Tim Danhof | 29 | 1 | 17+9 | 1 | 2+1 | 0 |
| 3 | DF | (Netherlands) NED | Siemen Voet | 39 | 0 | 35+1 | 0 | 3 | 0 |
| 4 | DF | (Netherlands) NED | Jesper Verlaat | 7 | 0 | 6 | 0 | 1 | 0 |
| 5 | MF | (Germany) GER | Thore Jacobsen | 36 | 9 | 31+1 | 7 | 4 | 2 |
| 7 | FW | (Germany) GER | Florian Niederlechner | 30 | 3 | 17+10 | 3 | 0+3 | 0 |
| 8 | MF | (Germany) GER | David Philipp | 32 | 4 | 11+17 | 3 | 3+1 | 1 |
| 9 | FW | (Germany) GER | Justin Steinkötter | 28 | 2 | 5+19 | 1 | 2+2 | 1 |
| 11 | GK | (Germany) GER | René Vollath | 4 | 0 | 3 | 0 | 1 | 0 |
| 13 | MF | (Germany) GER | Max Christiansen | 18 | 3 | 7+8 | 2 | 2+1 | 1 |
| 16 | DF | (Italy) ITA | Max Reinthaler | 27 | 2 | 20+2 | 1 | 5 | 1 |
| 17 | MF | (Germany) GER | Morris Schröter | 6 | 1 | 0+5 | 0 | 1 | 1 |
| 18 | DF | (Germany) GER | Kilian Jakob | 13 | 0 | 5+5 | 0 | 2+1 | 0 |
| 19 | FW | (Turkey) TUR | Emre Erdoğan | 1 | 0 | 0 | 0 | 0+1 | 0 |
| 20 | MF | (Germany) GER | Samuel Althaus | 13 | 2 | 5+3 | 1 | 1+4 | 1 |
| 21 | GK | (Germany) GER | Thomas Dähne | 38 | 0 | 34 | 0 | 4 | 0 |
| 22 | FW | (Denmark) DEN | Sigurd Haugen | 38 | 18 | 29+5 | 16 | 4 | 2 |
| 23 | MF | (Bosnia and Herzegovina) BIH | Damjan Dordan | 12 | 0 | 4+8 | 0 | 0 | 0 |
| 25 | DF | (Germany) GER | Sean Dulic | 23 | 1 | 21+1 | 1 | 1 | 0 |
| 26 | MF | (Germany) GER | Philipp Maier | 26 | 3 | 18+3 | 2 | 4+1 | 1 |
| 27 | DF | (Austria) AUT | Manuel Pfeifer | 19 | 0 | 14+1 | 0 | 3+1 | 0 |
| 29 | DF | (Germany) GER | Marvin Rittmüller | 31 | 1 | 22+6 | 1 | 2+1 | 0 |
| 30 | FW | (Germany) GER | Maximilian Wolfram | 25 | 4 | 9+11 | 1 | 3+2 | 3 |
| 31 | FW | (Germany) GER | Kevin Volland | 34 | 5 | 31 | 4 | 3 | 1 |
| 33 | DF | (Germany) GER | Lasse Faßmann | 9 | 0 | 5+3 | 0 | 1 | 0 |
| 34 | FW | (Germany) GER | Patrick Hobsch | 42 | 12 | 13+23 | 6 | 5+1 | 6 |
| 35 | MF | (Germany) GER | Xaver Kiefersauer | 4 | 0 | 2+1 | 0 | 1 | 0 |
| 36 | MF | (Germany) GER | Tunay Deniz | 11 | 1 | 7+3 | 0 | 1 | 1 |
| 37 | DF | (Austria) AUT | Raphael Schifferl | 22 | 1 | 15+4 | 0 | 3 | 1 |
| 40 | GK | (Germany) GER | Paul Bachmann | 2 | 0 | 0 | 0 | 1+1 | 0 |
| 41 | DF | (Austria) AUT | Clemens Lippmann | 28 | 1 | 19+5 | 1 | 1+3 | 0 |
| 42 | MF | (Germany) GER | Noah Klose | 1 | 0 | 0+1 | 0 | 0 | 0 |
| 43 | DF | (Germany) GER | Finn Fuchs | 1 | 0 | 0 | 0 | 0+1 | 0 |
| 44 | MF | (Austria) AUT | Loris Husic | 6 | 0 | 1+4 | 0 | 0+1 | 0 |
Players away on loan:
Players who featured but departed the club permanently during the season:
| 14 | FW | (Japan) JPN | Sōichirō Kōzuki | 3 | 0 | 0+1 | 0 | 2 | 0 |

=== Goal scorers ===
As of match played 23 May 2026

| Place | Position | Nation | Number | Name | 3. Liga | Bavarian Cup | Total |
|---|---|---|---|---|---|---|---|
| 1 | FW | (Denmark) | 22 | Sigurd Haugen | 16 | 2 | 18 |
| 2 | FW | (Germany) | 34 | Patrick Hobsch | 6 | 6 | 12 |
| 3 | MF | (Germany) | 5 | Thore Jacobsen | 7 | 2 | 9 |
| 4 | FW | (Germany) | 31 | Kevin Volland | 4 | 1 | 5 |
| 5 | MF | (Germany) | 8 | David Philipp | 3 | 1 | 4 |
| 5 | FW | (Germany) | 30 | Maximilian Wolfram | 1 | 3 | 4 |
| 7 | FW | (Germany) | 7 | Florian Niederlechner | 3 | 0 | 3 |
| 7 | MF | (Germany) | 13 | Max Christiansen | 2 | 1 | 3 |
| 7 | MF | (Germany) | 26 | Philipp Maier | 2 | 1 | 3 |
| 7 | | | | Own goal | 3 | 0 | 3 |
| 11 | DF | (Italy) | 16 | Max Reinthaler | 1 | 1 | 2 |
| 11 | FW | (Germany) | 9 | Justin Steinkötter | 1 | 1 | 2 |
| 11 | MF | (Germany) | 20 | Samuel Althaus | 1 | 1 | 2 |
| 14 | DF | (Germany) | 25 | Sean Dulic | 1 | 0 | 1 |
| 14 | DF | (Germany) | 29 | Marvin Rittmüller | 1 | 0 | 1 |
| 14 | DF | (Austria) | 41 | Clemens Lippmann | 1 | 0 | 1 |
| 14 | DF | (Germany) | 2 | Tim Danhof | 1 | 0 | 1 |
| 14 | MF | (Germany) | 17 | Morris Schröter | 0 | 1 | 1 |
| 14 | MF | (Germany) | 36 | Tunay Deniz | 0 | 1 | 1 |
| 14 | DF | (Austria) | 37 | Raphael Schifferl | 0 | 1 | 1 |
| Total | | | | | 54 | 23 | 77 |

=== Clean sheets ===
As of match played 23 May 2026

| Place | Position | Nation | Number | Name | 3. Liga | Bavarian Cup | Total |
|---|---|---|---|---|---|---|---|
| 1 | GK | (Germany) | 21 | Thomas Dähne | 9 | 2 | 11 |
| 2 | GK | (Germany) | 40 | Paul Bachmann | 0 | 2 | 2 |
| 3 | GK | (Germany) | 11 | René Vollath | 0 | 1 | 1 |
| Total | | | | | 9 | 4 | 13 |

Thomas Dähne & Paul Bachmann both played in 1860's 8-0 victory over TSV Geiselbullach on 12 August 2025

=== Disciplinary record ===
As of match played 23 May 2026

| Number | Nation | Position | Name | 3. Liga | | Bavarian Cup | | Total | |
| Number | Nation | Position | Name | Yellow card | Red card | Yellow card | Red card | Yellow card | Red card |
|---|---|---|---|---|---|---|---|---|---|
| 2 | (Germany) | DF | Tim Danhof | 3 | 0 | 0 | 0 | 3 | 0 |
| 3 | (Netherlands) | DF | Siemen Voet | 8 | 0 | 1 | 0 | 9 | 0 |
| 4 | (Netherlands) | DF | Jesper Verlaat | 4 | 0 | 0 | 0 | 4 | 0 |
| 5 | (Germany) | MF | Thore Jacobsen | 11 | 2 | 2 | 0 | 13 | 2 |
| 7 | (Germany) | FW | Florian Niederlechner | 6 | 0 | 1 | 0 | 7 | 0 |
| 8 | (Germany) | MF | David Philipp | 6 | 0 | 0 | 0 | 6 | 0 |
| 9 | (Germany) | FW | Justin Steinkötter | 2 | 0 | 1 | 0 | 3 | 0 |
| 13 | (Germany) | MF | Max Christiansen | 1 | 0 | 0 | 0 | 1 | 0 |
| 16 | (Italy) | DF | Max Reinthaler | 4 | 0 | 1 | 0 | 5 | 0 |
| 18 | (Germany) | DF | Kilian Jakob | 3 | 0 | 0 | 0 | 3 | 0 |
| 20 | (Germany) | MF | Samuel Althaus | 2 | 0 | 0 | 0 | 2 | 0 |
| 21 | (Germany) | GK | Thomas Dähne | 1 | 0 | 0 | 0 | 1 | 0 |
| 22 | (Denmark) | FW | Sigurd Haugen | 4 | 0 | 0 | 0 | 4 | 0 |
| 23 | (Bosnia and Herzegovina) | MF | Damjan Dordan | 1 | 0 | 0 | 0 | 1 | 0 |
| 25 | (Germany) | DF | Sean Dulic | 3 | 0 | 1 | 0 | 4 | 0 |
| 26 | (Germany) | MF | Philipp Maier | 5 | 0 | 1 | 0 | 6 | 0 |
| 27 | (Austria) | DF | Manuel Pfeifer | 3 | 0 | 0 | 0 | 3 | 0 |
| 29 | (Germany) | DF | Marvin Rittmüller | 3 | 0 | 0 | 0 | 3 | 0 |
| 30 | (Germany) | FW | Maximilian Wolfram | 0 | 0 | 1 | 0 | 1 | 0 |
| 31 | (Germany) | FW | Kevin Volland | 13 | 2 | 0 | 0 | 13 | 2 |
| 33 | (Germany) | DF | Lasse Faßmann | 1 | 0 | 0 | 0 | 1 | 0 |
| 34 | (Germany) | FW | Patrick Hobsch | 2 | 0 | 0 | 0 | 2 | 0 |
| 36 | (Germany) | MF | Tunay Deniz | 5 | 0 | 0 | 0 | 5 | 0 |
| 37 | (Austria) | DF | Raphael Schifferl | 2 | 0 | 1 | 0 | 3 | 0 |
| 44 | (Austria) | MF | Loris Husic | 1 | 0 | 0 | 0 | 1 | 0 |
Players away on loan:
Players who left 1860 Munich during the season:
| Total | | | | 94 | 4 | 10 | 0 | 104 | 4 |
