= 2023–24 SV Wehen Wiesbaden season =

SV Wehen Wiesbaden
2023–24 season
- Stadium: Brita-Arena
- 2. Bundesliga: 16th (relegated)
- DFB-Pokal: First round

The 2023–24 SV Wehen Wiesbaden season was SV Wehen Wiesbaden's 98th season in existence and first season back in the 2. Bundesliga. They also competed in the DFB-Pokal.

== Players ==
=== First-team squad ===
As of 10 August 2023

Note: Flags indicate national team as defined under FIFA eligibility rules; some limited exceptions apply. Players may hold more than one non-FIFA nationality.

No.	Pos.	Nation	Player
1	GK	GER	Arthur Lyska
2	DF	SUI	Martin Angha
4	DF	GER	Sascha Mockenhaupt (captain)
5	MF	GER	Emanuel Taffertshofer
6	MF	GER	Gino Fechner
7	MF	GER	Robin Heußer
8	MF	GER	Nick Bätzner
9	FW	NED	Thijmen Goppel
10	FW	GER	Antonio Jonjić
11	MF	ENG	Keanan Bennetts
13	GK	MAR	Mohamed Amsif
14	FW	CRO	Franko Kovačević
15	DF	ITA	Max Reinthaler
16	GK	GER	Florian Stritzel
17	DF	GER	Florian Carstens

No.	Pos.	Nation	Player
18	FW	CRO	Ivan Prtajin
19	MF	DEN	Bjarke Jacobsen
20	MF	KOR	Lee Hyun-ju (on loan from Bayern Munich II)
21	MF	GER	Julius Kade
22	MF	GER	Amin Farouk
24	DF	DEN	Marcus Mathisen
26	DF	SRB	Aleksandar Vukotić
27	DF	GER	Nico Rieble
29	FW	GER	Lasse Günther (on loan from Augsburg)
30	MF	CAN	Kianz Froese
31	GK	GER	Noah Brdar
33	FW	AUS	John Iredale
34	FW	BIH	Amar Ćatić
36	DF	GER	Nassim Elouarti

== Transfers ==
=== In ===
Pos.	Player	Transferred from	Fee	Date	Source

=== Out ===
Pos.	Player	Transferred from	Fee	Date	Source

== Pre-season and friendlies ==
Win Draw Loss Fixtures

15 November 2023 Friendly	Wehen Wiesbaden (Germany)	6–2	(Germany) Schott Mainz

6 January 2024 Friendly	Wehen Wiesbaden (Germany)	2–1	(Germany) SV Sandhausen	Taunusstein
12:00				Stadium: Stadion am Halberg

== Competitions ==
Competition	First match	Last match	Starting round	Final position	Record							
Competition	First match	Last match	Starting round	Final position	Pld	W	D	L	GF	GA	GD	Win %
2. Bundesliga	28 July 2023	19 May 2024	Matchday 1	16th place	36	8	9	19	39	54	−15	22.22
DFB-Pokal	27 September 2023		First round	First round	1	0	0	1	2	3	−1	0.00
Total					37	8	9	20	41	57	−16	21.62

Last updated: finished
Source: Soccerway

=== 2. Bundesliga ===
==== League table ====
Pos	Team	Pld	W	D	L	GF	GA	GD	Pts	Qualification or relegation
14	1. FC Magdeburg	34	9	11	14	46	54	−8	38	
15	Eintracht Braunschweig	34	11	5	18	37	53	−16	38	
16	Wehen Wiesbaden (R)	34	8	8	18	36	50	−14	32	Qualification for relegation play-offs
17	Hansa Rostock (R)	34	9	4	21	30	57	−27	31	Relegation to 3. Liga
18	VfL Osnabrück (R)	34	6	10	18	31	69	−38	28	Relegation to 3. Liga

Source: DFB
Rules for classification: 1) Points; 2) Goal difference; 3) Goals scored; 4) Head-to-head results; 5) Head-to-head away goals scored; 6) Away goals scored; 7) Play-off.
(Rules 4–6 only apply after home and away matches have been played between the tied teams.)
(R) Relegated

==== Results summary ====
Overall								Home						Away					
Pld	W	D	L	GF	GA	GD	Pts	W	D	L	GF	GA	GD	W	D	L	GF	GA	GD
34	8	8	18	36	50	−14	32	4	5	8	18	25	−7	4	3	10	18	25	−7

Source: DFB

==== Results by round ====
Round	1	2	3	4	5	6	7	8	9	10	11	12	13	14	15	16	17	18	19	20	21	22	23	24	25	26	27	28	29	30	31	32	33	34
Ground	H	A	H	A	H	A	H	A	H	A	H	A	H	A	A	H	A	A	H	A	H	A	H	A	H	A	H	A	H	A	H	H	A	H
Result	D	W	W	L	D	L	L	L	D	W	W	W	W	L	L	L	D	L	W	D	D	L	L	W	D	L	L	L	L	D	L	L	L	L
Position	10	6	3	7	8	10	14	15	15	13	11	8	7	8	9	11	11	13	11	12	13	13	13	13	13	13	12	14	14	15	16	16	16	16

Updated to match(es) played on 23 February 2024. Source: DFB
A = Away; H = Home; W = Win; D = Draw; L = Loss

==== Matches ====
The league fixtures were unveiled on 30 June 2023.

29 July 2023 1	Wehen Wiesbaden	1–1	1. FC Magdeburg	Wiesbaden
13:00 UTC+2	Prtajin 62'	Report	Schuler 29'	Stadium: Brita-Arena; Attendance: 7,219; Referee: Benjamin Brand

4 August 2023 2	Hertha BSC	0–1	Wehen Wiesbaden	Berlin
18:30 UTC+2		Report	Günther 90+2'	Stadium: Olympiastadion; Attendance: 40,075; Referee: Florian Lechner

18 August 2023 3	Wehen Wiesbaden	1–0	Karlsruher SC	Wiesbaden
18:30 UTC+2	Lee 22'	Report		Stadium: Brita-Arena; Attendance: 10,626; Referee: Wolfgang Haslberger

27 August 2023 4	1. FC Nürnberg	2–1	Wehen Wiesbaden	Nuremberg
13:30 UTC+2	Gyamerah 68'; Handwerker 76' (pen.)	Report	Prtajin 55'	Stadium: Max-Morlock-Stadion; Attendance: 26,547; Referee: Martin Petersen

2 September 2023 5	Wehen Wiesbaden	1–1	Schalke 04	Wiesbaden
13:00 UTC+2	Reinthaler 90+5'	Report	Mohr 54'	Stadium: Brita-Arena; Attendance: 11,003; Referee: Florian Exner

15 September 2023 6	SC Paderborn 07	2–1	Wehen Wiesbaden	Paderborn
18:30 UTC+2	Klaas 51'; Nadj 60'	Report	Froese 23'	Stadium: Home Deluxe Arena; Attendance: 10,584; Referee: Robert Kampka

23 September 2023 7	Wehen Wiesbaden	0–2	SV Elversberg	Wiesbaden
13:00 UTC+2		Report	Jacobsen 20' (pen.); Faghir 77'	Stadium: Brita-Arena; Attendance: 7,526; Referee: Arne Aarnink

30 September 2023 8	Hannover 96	2–1	Wehen Wiesbaden	Hannover
13:00 UTC+2	Nielsen 11'; Köhn 74'	Report		Stadium: Heinz von Heiden Arena; Attendance: 31,100; Referee: Nicolas Winter

7 October 2023 9	Wehen Wiesbaden	1–1	Hamburger SV	Wiesbaden
13:00 UTC+2	Vukotić 81'	Report	Muheim 89'	Stadium: Brita-Arena; Attendance: 12,100; Referee: Wolfgang Haslberger

21 October 2023 10	VfL Osnabrück	0–2	Wehen Wiesbaden	Osnabrück
13:00 UTC+2		Report	Lee 9'; Heußer 70'	Stadium: Stadion an der Bremer Brücke; Attendance: 14,491; Referee: Patrick Schwengers

29 October 2023 11	Wehen Wiesbaden	1–0	Hansa Rostock	Wiesbaden
13:30 UTC+1	Prtajin 89'	Report		Stadium: Brita-Arena; Attendance: 8,619; Referee: Christian Dingert

3 November 2023 12	Fortuna Düsseldorf	1–3	Wehen Wiesbaden	Düsseldorf
18:30 UTC+1	Engelhardt 79'	Report	Lee 10'; Catic 26'; Iredale 42' (pen.)	Stadium: Merkur Spiel-Arena; Attendance: 27,715; Referee: Florian Heft

12 November 2023 13	Wehen Wiesbaden	2–1	1. FC Kaiserslautern	Wiesbaden
13:30 UTC+1	Goppel 51'; Prtajin 65'	Report	Ritter 39'	Stadium: Brita-Arena; Attendance: 12,100; Referee: Tobias Reichel

26 November 2023 14	Greuther Fürth	2–0	Wehen Wiesbaden	Fürth
13:30 UTC+1	Sieb 20'; Hrgota 84'	Report		Stadium: Sportpark Ronhof; Attendance: 9,576; Referee: Frank Willenborg

2 December 2023 15	Holstein Kiel	3–2	Wehen Wiesbaden	Kiel
13:00 UTC+1	Skrzybski 19' (pen.); Arp 37'; Porath 58'	Report	Prtajin 81', 90+3' (pen.)	Stadium: Holstein-Stadion; Attendance: 10,754; Referee: Patrick Alt

8 December 2023 16	Wehen Wiesbaden	1–3	Eintracht Braunschweig	Wiesbaden
18:30 UTC+1	Vukotić 18'	Report	Kaufmann 48', 76'; Philippe 56'	Stadium: Brita-Arena; Attendance: 7,726; Referee: Max Burda

17 December 2023 17	FC St. Pauli	1–1	Wehen Wiesbaden	Hamburg
13:30 UTC+1	Hartel 47'	Report	Iredale 84'	Stadium: Millerntor-Stadion; Attendance: 29,332; Referee: Timo Gerach

21 January 2024 18	1. FC Magdeburg	1–0	Wehen Wiesbaden	Magdeburg
13:30 UTC+1	Ito 80'	Report		Stadium: MDCC-Arena; Attendance: 22,582; Referee: Patrick Alt

27 January 2024 19	Wehen Wiesbaden	3–1	Hertha BSC	Wiesbaden
13:00 CET	Kovačević 24' 53'; Goppel 72'	Report	Kenny 59'; Leistner (yellow card) 76'; Tabaković (yellow card) 83'	Stadium: Brita-Arena; Attendance: 10,454; Referee: (Germany) Wolfgang Haslberger

2 February 2024 20	Karlsruher SC	2–2	Wehen Wiesbaden	Karlsruhe
18:30 UTC+1	Zivzivadze 35'; Matanović 53'	Report	Prtajin 48'; Bätzner 74'	Stadium: Wildparkstadion; Attendance: 18,500; Referee: Tom Bauer

9 February 2024 21	Wehen Wiesbaden	1–1	1. FC Nürnberg	Wiesbaden
18:30 UTC+1	Prtajin 61'	Report	Márquez 70'	Stadium: Brita-Arena; Attendance: 9,526; Referee: Robert Kampka

17 February 2024 22	Schalke 04	1–0	Wehen Wiesbaden	Gelsenkirchen
13:00 UTC+1	Karaman 60' (pen.)	Report		Stadium: Veltins-Arena; Attendance: 60,542; Referee: Deniz Aytekin

23 February 2024 23	Wehen Wiesbaden	1–2	SC Paderborn	Wiesbaden
18:30 UTC+1	Kovačević 30'	Report	Kostons 39'; Bilbija 82'	Stadium: Brita-Arena; Attendance: 6,119; Referee: Florian Lechner

3 March 2024 24	SV Elversberg	0–3	Wehen Wiesbaden	Spiesen-Elversberg
13:30 UTC+1		Report	Thijmen Goppel 44'; Lee 49'; Iredale 84'	Stadium: Waldstadion an der Kaiserlinde; Attendance: 8,071; Referee: Alexander Sather

9 March 2024 25	Wehen Wiesbaden	1–1	Hannover 96	Wiesbaden
13:00 UTC+1	Prtajin 33'	Report	Voglsammer 54'	Stadium: Brita-Arena; Attendance: 10,089; Referee: Patrick Schwengers

17 March 2024 26	Hamburger SV	3–0	Wehen Wiesbaden	Hamburg
13:30 UTC+1	Muheim 32'; Bénes 51'; Pherai (yellow card) 67'; Königsdörffer 85'	Report	Mathisen (yellow card) 49'	Stadium: Volksparkstadion; Attendance: 55,523; Referee: Bastian Dankert

31 March 2024 27	Wehen Wiesbaden	0–1	VfL Osnabrück	Wiesbaden
13:30 UTC+2		Report	Conteh 31'	Stadium: Brita-Arena; Attendance: 6,130; Referee: Florian Exner

5 April 2024 28	Hansa Rostock	3–1	Wehen Wiesbaden	Rostock
18:30 UTC+2	Roßbach 51'; Pröger 72'; Ingelsson 90+4'	Report	Prtajin 78'	Stadium: Ostseestadion; Attendance: 25,500; Referee: Nicolas Winter

13 April 2024 29	Wehen Wiesbaden	0–2	Fortuna Düsseldorf	Wiesbaden
13:00 UTC+2		Report	Appelkamp 13'; Jóhannesson 64'	Stadium: Brita-Arena; Attendance: 11,200; Referee: Timo Gerach

20 April 2024 30	1. FC Kaiserslautern	1–1	Wehen Wiesbaden	Kaiserslautern
13:00 UTC+2	Kaloč 30'	Report	Prtajin 74'	Stadium: Fritz-Walter-Stadion; Attendance: 42,168; Referee: Arne Aarnink

28 April 2024 31	Wehen Wiesbaden	3–5	Greuther Fürth	Wiesbaden
13:30 UTC+2	Prtajin 3', 72' (pen.); Agrafiotis 18'	Report	Hrgota 26', 90+6'; Sieb 38', 43'; Petkov 84'	Stadium: Brita-Arena; Attendance: 8,012; Referee: Patrick Ittrich

5 May 2024 32	Wehen Wiesbaden	0–1	Holstein Kiel	Wiesbaden
13:30 UTC+2		Report	Becker 65'	Stadium: Brita-Arena; Attendance: 9,000; Referee: Felix Zwayer

12 May 2024 33	Eintracht Braunschweig	1–0	Wehen Wiesbaden	Braunschweig
13:30 UTC+2	Helgason 22'	Report		Stadium: Eintracht-Stadion; Attendance: 21,026; Referee: Marco Fritz

19 May 2024 34	Wehen Wiesbaden	1–2	FC St. Pauli	Wiesbaden
15:30 UTC+2	Kovačević 10'	Report	Albers 51'; Sinani 82'	Stadium: Brita-Arena; Attendance: 12,100; Referee: Deniz Aytekin

==== Relegation play-offs ====
24 May 2024 First leg	Jahn Regensburg	2–2	Wehen Wiesbaden	Regensburg
20:30 UTC+2	Ganaus 27'; Kother 79'	Report	Heußer 66'; Iredale 71'	Stadium: Jahnstadion; Attendance: 13,378; Referee: Tobias Reichel

28 May 2024 Second leg	Wehen Wiesbaden	1–2	Jahn Regensburg	Wiesbaden
20:30 UTC+2	Prtajin 81'	Report	Kother 45+2'; Faber 47'	Stadium: Brita-Arena; Attendance: 11,008; Referee: Martin Petersen

=== DFB-Pokal ===
27 September 2023 First round	Wehen Wiesbaden	2–3	RB Leipzig	Wiesbaden
20:45 CEST (UTC+2)	Prtajin 41', 73'; Goppel (yellow card) 45+1'; Vukotić (yellow card) 79'; Heußer (yellow card) 84'	Report	Forsberg 7'; Šeško 18', 70'; Openda (yellow card) 85'	Stadium: BRITA-Arena; Attendance: 12,000; Referee: Robert Hartmann
