= 2020–21 ADO Den Haag season =

ADO Den Haag
2020–21 season
- Chairman: Ben Knüppe
- Head coach: Aleksandar Ranković
- Stadium: Cars Jeans Stadion
- Eredivisie: 18th (relegated)
- KNVB Cup: Round of 16
Home colours	Away colours	Third colours

The 2020–21 ADO Den Haag season was the club's 116th season in existence and the 13th consecutive season in the top flight of Dutch football. In addition to the domestic league, ADO Den Haag participated in this season's edition of the KNVB Cup. The season covered the period from 1 July 2020 to 30 June 2021.

== Players ==
=== First-team squad ===
No.	Pos.	Nation	Player
1	GK	NED	Luuk Koopmans
2	DF	NED	Milan van Ewijk
3	DF	NED	Peet Bijen
4	DF	NED	Boy Kemper
5	DF	NED	Juan Familia-Castillo (on loan from (England) Chelsea)
8	MF	NED	John Goossens
9	FW	GER	Jonas Arweiler (on loan from FC Utrecht)
10	MF	NED	Nasser El Khayati
14	MF	NED	Kees de Boer
15	DF	ITA	Dario Del Fabro (on loan from (Italy) Juventus)
17	MF	ISR	Ilay Elmkies (on loan from (Germany) 1899 Hoffenheim)
18	FW	GER	David Philipp (on loan from (Germany) Werder Bremen)
19	DF	NED	Shaquille Pinas
20	FW	NED	Vicente Besuijen
21	FW	NED	Bilal Ould-Chikh
22	GK	NED	Robert Zwinkels
23	MF	ESP	Pascu

No.	Pos.	Nation	Player
24	FW	NED	Bobby Adekanye (on loan from (Italy) Lazio)
25	DF	NED	Jamal Amofa
26	MF	NED	Sem Steijn
27	FW	NED	Yahya Boussakou
28	MF	NED	Maarten Rieder
29	FW	NED	Michiel Kramer
30	MF	MAR	Youness Mokhtar
31	FW	NED	Ricardo Kishna
33	FW	BEL	Amine Essabri
34	FW	BIH	Amar Ćatić
35	GK	NED	Youri Schoonderwaldt
43	DF	NED	Lassana Faye (on loan from Sparta Rotterdam)
51	DF	NED	Gianni Zuiverloon
53	DF	NED	Daryl Janmaat (captain)
88	MF	NED	Marko Vejinović
90	GK	AUT	Martin Fraisl
95	MF	CRO	Tomislav Gomelt

=== Out on loan ===
Note: Flags indicate national team as defined under FIFA eligibility rules; some limited exceptions apply. Players may hold more than one non-FIFA nationality.

No.	Pos.	Nation	Player
—	MF	NED	Danny Bakker (to Roda JC until 30 June 2021)
—	FW	NED	Hugo Botermans (to FC Eindhoven until 30 June 2021)
—	GK	NED	Mike Havekotte (to MVV Maastricht until 30 June 2021)
—	MF	NED	Lorenzo van Kleef (to FC Eindhoven until 30 June 2021)

No.	Pos.	Nation	Player
—	DF	NED	Aaron Meijers (to Sparta Rotterdam until 30 June 2021)
—	DF	NED	Dehninio Muringen (to FC Dordrecht until 30 June 2021)
—	DF	GHA	Robin Polley (to FC Dordrecht until 30 June 2021)
—	FW	NED	Evan Rottier (to TOP Oss until 30 June 2021)

== Pre-season and friendlies ==
Win Draw Loss

25 July 2020 Friendly	Telstar (Netherlands)	0–0	(Netherlands) ADO Den Haag	Velsen-Zuid, Netherlands
17:00 CEST (UTC+2)				Stadium: Rabobank IJmond Stadion

31 July 2020 Friendly	MVV (Netherlands)	0–0	(Netherlands) ADO Den Haag	Maastricht, Netherlands
20:00 CEST (UTC+2)				Stadium: De Geusselt

2 August 2020 Friendly	Go Ahead Eagles (Netherlands)	Cancelled	(Netherlands) ADO Den Haag	Deventer, Netherlands
14:30 CEST (UTC+2)				Stadium: De Adelaarshorst

8 August 2020 Friendly	Almere City (Netherlands)	1–2	(Netherlands) ADO Den Haag	Almere, Netherlands
17:00 CEST (UTC+2)				Stadium: Yanmar Stadion

15 August 2020 Friendly	NAC Breda (Netherlands)	Cancelled	(Netherlands) ADO Den Haag	Breda, Netherlands
17:00 CEST (UTC+2)				Stadium: Rat Verlegh Stadion

22 August 2020 Friendly	ADO Den Haag (Netherlands)	2–2	(Netherlands) Vitesse	The Hague, Netherlands
20:00 CEST (UTC+2)				Stadium: Cars Jeans Stadion

29 August 2020 Friendly	ADO Den Haag (Netherlands)	1–0	(Netherlands) AZ	The Hague, Netherlands
17:30 CEST (UTC+2)	Arweiler 45'			Stadium: Cars Jeans Stadion; Attendance: 0 Referee: Jochem Kamphuis

4 September 2020 Friendly	Sparta Rotterdam (Netherlands)	1–1	(Netherlands) ADO Den Haag	Rotterdam, Netherlands
14:00 CEST (UTC+2)	Fortes 88'		Kramer 74' (pen.)	Stadium: Het Kasteel; Attendance: 0

28 September 2020 Friendly	ADO Den Haag (Netherlands)	1–0	(Netherlands) FC Utrecht	The Hague, Netherlands
16:00 CEST (UTC+2)	Rațiu 51'			Stadium: Cars Jeans Stadion; Attendance: 0

== Competitions ==
=== Overview ===
Competition	First match	Last match	Starting round	Final position	Record							
Competition	First match	Last match	Starting round	Final position	Pld	W	D	L	GF	GA	GD	Win %
Eredivisie	13 September 2020	16 May 2021	Matchday 1	18th	34	4	10	20	29	76	−47	11.76
KNVB Cup	28 October 2020	19 January 2021	First round	Round of 16	2	0	1	1	2	3	−1	0.00
Total					36	4	11	21	31	79	−48	11.11

Source: Soccerway

=== Eredivisie ===
==== League table ====
Pos	Team	Pld	W	D	L	GF	GA	GD	Pts	Qualification or relegation
14	Willem II	34	8	7	19	40	68	−28	31	
15	RKC Waalwijk	34	7	9	18	33	55	−22	30	
16	Emmen (R)	34	7	9	18	40	68	−28	30	Qualification for the Relegation play-offs (Note: Seven teams, one from the Eredivisie and six from the Eerste Divisie, play for one spot in the 2021–22 Eredivisie. The remaining six teams play in the 2021–22 Eerste Divisie.)
17	VVV-Venlo (R)	34	6	5	23	43	91	−48	23	Relegation to Eerste Divisie
18	ADO Den Haag (R)	34	4	10	20	29	76	−47	22	Relegation to Eerste Divisie

Source: Eredivisie, Soccerway
Rules for classification: Season in progress: 1) Most points won; 2) Less points lost; 3) Goal difference; 4) Goals scored; 5) Alphabetical order; End of season: 1) Points; 2) Goal difference; 3) Goals scored; 4) Head-to-head points; 5) Head-to-head goal difference; 6) Head-to-head away goals scored; 7) Play-off if relevant for deciding champion, relegation or participating in a European league, otherwise by draw. 8) Penalty shoot-out (only after a play-off)
(R) Relegated

==== Results summary ====
Overall								Home						Away					
Pld	W	D	L	GF	GA	GD	Pts	W	D	L	GF	GA	GD	W	D	L	GF	GA	GD
34	4	10	20	29	76	−47	22	1	6	10	17	38	−21	3	4	10	12	38	−26

Source: Eredivisie

==== Results by round ====
Round	1	2	3	4	5	6	7	8	9	10	11	12	13	14	15	16	17	18	19	20	21	22	23	24	25	26	27	28	29	30	31	32	33	34
Ground	A	H	A	A	H	H	A	H	A	H	A	A	H	H	A	H	A	H	A	H	A	H	A	H	A	H	A	H	A	H	H	A	H	A
Result	L	L	L	W	L	D	L	L	L	D	D	D	L	L	W	L	L	D	L	D	D	D	L	D	L	L	L	L	D	L	W	W	L	L
Position	15	15	16	14	16	15	15	16	16	16	17	17	17	17	16	16	17	16	16	17	17	17	17	17	17	17	18	18	18	18	18	18	18	18

Source: Eredivisie
A = Away; H = Home; W = Win; D = Draw; L = Loss

==== Matches ====
The league fixtures were announced on 24 July 2020.

13 September 2020 1	Heracles Almelo	2–0	ADO Den Haag	Almelo
14:30 CEST (UTC+2)	Vloet 48'; Bijleveld (yellow card) 68'; Van der Water 70'	Report	Kemper (yellow card) 18' (yellow-red card) 72'; Bourard (yellow card) 25'	Stadium: Erve Asito; Attendance: 2,700; Referee: Sander van der Eijk

20 September 2020 2	ADO Den Haag	0–1	FC Groningen	The Hague
12:15 CEST (UTC+2)	Kramer (yellow card) 49'	Report	Pinas 23' (o.g.); Dammers (yellow card) 45'	Stadium: Cars Jeans Stadion; Attendance: 3,378; Referee: Danny Makkelie

27 September 2020 3	Feyenoord	4–2	ADO Den Haag	Rotterdam
12:15 CEST (UTC+2)	Geertruida 27'; Haps (yellow card) 36'; Fer (yellow card) 53'; Senesi 57'; Narsingh 71'; Berguis 84' (pen.)	Report	Arweiler 11'; Pinas 69' (pen.), (yellow card) 81'	Stadium: De Kuip; Attendance: 13,000; Referee: Dennis Higler

3 October 2020 4	VVV-Venlo	1–2	ADO Den Haag	Venlo
20:00 CEST (UTC+2)	Gelmi (yellow card) 3'; Giakoumakis 4'; Linthorst (yellow card) 52'	Report	Pinas 3' (pen.); Van Ewijk (yellow card) 53'; Philipp 90+3'	Stadium: De Koel; Attendance: 0 Referee: Bas Nijhuis

18 October 2020 5	ADO Den Haag	0–2	Vitesse	The Hague
14:30 CEST (UTC+2)		Report	Broja 32', 71'; Tannane (red card) 45'	Stadium: Cars Jeans Stadion; Attendance: 0 Referee: Richard Martens

25 October 2020 6	ADO Den Haag	2–2	AZ	The Hague
20:00 CET (UTC+1)	De Boer (yellow card) 47'; Van Ewijk 64'; Kramer 87'; Besuijen (yellow card) 90+3'	Report	Guðmundsson 33'; De Wit (yellow card) 60'; Karlsson 66'	Stadium: Cars Jeans Stadion; Attendance: 0 Referee: Allard Lindhout

1 November 2020 7	PSV	4–0	ADO Den Haag	Eindhoven
16:45 CET (UTC+1)	Zahavi 16' (pen.); Teze (yellow card) 37'; Madueke 51', 90+2'; Thomas 84'	Report	Karelis (yellow card) 80'	Stadium: Philips Stadion; Attendance: 0 Referee: Jochem Kamphuis

7 November 2020 8	ADO Den Haag	2–4	FC Twente	The Hague
16:30 CET (UTC+1)	Pleguezuelo 76' (o.g.); Bourard 86'	Report	Menig 41'; Danilo 59', 88'; Oosterwolde (yellow card) 80'; Van Leeuwen 90+4'	Stadium: Cars Jeans Stadion; Attendance: 0 Referee: Rob Dieperink

22 November 2020 9	Sparta Rotterdam	6–0	ADO Den Haag	Rotterdam
14:30 CET (UTC+1)	Smeets (yellow card) 24'; Thy 43', 59'; Mijnans 53'; Harroui 56'; Engels 80', 85'	Report	Pinas (yellow card) 24'; Pascu (yellow card) 79'	Stadium: Het Kasteel; Attendance: 0 Referee: Kevin Blom

28 November 2020 10	ADO Den Haag	1–1	SC Heerenveen	The Hague
20:00 CET (UTC+1)	Philipp 13'	Report	J. Veerman 16'; H. Veerman (yellow card) 28'	Stadium: Cars Jeans Stadion; Attendance: 0 Referee: Danny Makkelie

6 December 2020 11	FC Utrecht	1–1	ADO Den Haag	Utrecht
14:30 CET (UTC+1)	Hoogma 48'; Dalmau (yellow card) 56' (yellow-red card) 66'; Gustafson (yellow card) 71'	Report	Faye (yellow card) 14'; Elmkies (yellow card) 34'; Kramer 85'; Bourard (yellow card) 90'; Besuijen (yellow card) 90+2'	Stadium: Stadion Galgenwaard; Attendance: 0 Referee: Sander van der Eijk

12 December 2020 12	FC Emmen	1–1	ADO Den Haag	Emmen
18:45 CET (UTC+1)	De Leeuw (yellow card) 55'; Araujo 72'	Report	Besuijen 6'; De Boer (yellow card) 42'	Stadium: De Oude Meerdijk; Attendance: 0 Referee: Jeroen Manschot

20 December 2020 13	ADO Den Haag	2–4	Ajax	The Hague
14:30 CET (UTC+1)	Kramer 49'; Bourard 70'	Report	Tadić 20'; Huntelaar 22', 32'; Labyad 30'	Stadium: Cars Jeans Stadion; Attendance: 0 Referee: Bas Nijhuis

23 December 2020 14	ADO Den Haag	0–2	PEC Zwolle	The Hague
20:00 CET (UTC+1)	Ould-Chikh (yellow card) 87'	Report	Van Duinen 51'; Kersten (yellow card) 75'; Leemans 84'	Stadium: Cars Jeans Stadion; Attendance: 0 Referee: Ingmar Oostrom

9 January 2021 15	RKC Waalwijk	0–1	ADO Den Haag	Waalwijk
16:30 CET (UTC+1)	Anita (yellow card) 19'	Report	Kemper 17'; Kramer (yellow card) 52'; Goossens (yellow card) 58'	Stadium: Mandemakers Stadion; Attendance: 0 Referee: Serdar Gözübüyük

13 January 2021 16	ADO Den Haag	1–4	VVV-Venlo	The Hague
20:00 CET (UTC+1)	Pinas (yellow card) 5'; Kemper (yellow card) 44'; Bourard 65'; Castillo (yellow card) 67'	Report	Giakoumakis 6' (pen.), 58', 68', 86' (pen.); John (yellow card) 35'; Van Crooij (yellow card) 42'; Dekker (yellow card) 66'	Stadium: Cars Jeans Stadion; Attendance: 0 Referee: Jannick van der Laan

16 January 2021 17	AZ	2–1	ADO Den Haag	Alkmaar
21:00 CET (UTC+1)	Aboukhlal 72', 89'	Report	Kramer 58'	Stadium: AFAS Stadion; Attendance: 0 Referee: Björn Kuipers

23 January 2021 18	ADO Den Haag	0–0	FC Emmen	The Hague
16:30 CET (UTC+1)	Kishna (yellow card) 86'; Kramer (yellow card) 90+2'	Report		Stadium: Cars Jeans Stadion; Attendance: 0 Referee: Bas Nijhuis

26 January 2021 19	FC Groningen	3–0	ADO Den Haag	Groningen
21:00 CET (UTC+1)	Lundqvist 18'; Larsen 43'; Da Cruz 68'	Report	Bourard (yellow card) 38'; Ćatić (yellow card) 76'	Stadium: Euroborg; Attendance: 0 Referee: Rob Dieperink

31 January 2021 20	ADO Den Haag	1–1	Sparta Rotterdam	The Hague
16:45 CET (UTC+1)	Gomelt 45'; Del Fabro (yellow card) 73'; Castillo (yellow card) 77'; Pinas (yellow card) 78'; Besuijen (yellow card) 90+4'	Report	Heylen (yellow card) 36'; Kharchouch 68'	Stadium: Cars Jeans Stadion; Attendance: 0 Referee: Erwin Blank

13 February 2021 22	ADO Den Haag	2–2	PSV	The Hague
18:45 CET (UTC+1)	Adekanye 27'; Kramer 90+3'	Report	Max (penalty missed) 21'; Malen 51', 76'; Sangaré (yellow card) 67'	Stadium: Cars Jeans Stadion; Attendance: 0 Referee: Pol van Boekel

20 February 2021 23	Fortuna Sittard	2–0	ADO Den Haag	Sittard
21:00 CET (UTC+1)	Semedo 26'; Polter 79'	Report	Van Ewijk (yellow card) 65'	Stadium: Fortuna Sittard Stadion; Attendance: 0 Referee: Bas Nijhuis

24 February 2021 21	Willem II	1–1	ADO Den Haag	Tilburg
16:30 CET (UTC+1)	Heerkens (yellow card) 37'; Ndayishimiye 48' (pen.); Peters (yellow card) 60' (yellow-red card) 75'; Owusu (yellow card) 90+6'	Report	Gomelt (red card) 42'; Pinas 62' (pen.)	Stadium: Koning Willem II Stadion; Attendance: 0 Referee: Siemen Mulder

27 February 2021 24	ADO Den Haag	0–0	RKC Waalwijk	The Hague
18:45 CET (UTC+1)	Amofa (yellow card) 22'; Vejinović (yellow card) 81'	Report	Touba (yellow card) 40'	Stadium: Cars Jeans Stadion; Attendance: 0 Referee: Jochem Kamphuis

6 March 2021 25	SC Heerenveen	3–0	ADO Den Haag	Heerenveen
20:00 CET (UTC+1)	De Jong 8'; Bochniewicz (yellow card) 44'; Van Bergen (yellow card) 67'; H. Veerman 78'; J. Veerman 89'	Report	Arweiler (yellow card) 90+2'	Stadium: Abe Lenstra Stadion; Attendance: 0 Referee: Björn Kuipers

13 March 2021 26	ADO Den Haag	1–2	Heracles Almelo	The Hague
18:45 CET (UTC+1)	Castillo (yellow card) 37'; Vejinović (yellow card) 58'; Fadiga 68' (o.g.); Van Ewijk (yellow card) 71'; Adekanye (yellow card) 75'; Mokhtar (yellow card) 90+3'; Kramer (yellow card) 90+3'	Report	Azzaoui (yellow card) 40'; Bakış 72'; Vloet 83'	Stadium: Cars Jeans Stadion; Attendance: 0 Referee: Richard Martens

21 March 2021 27	Ajax	5–0	ADO Den Haag	Amsterdam
20:00 CET (UTC+1)	Rensch 11'; Brobbey 21'; Álvarez 32'; Tadić 44'; Klaassen 50'	Report		Stadium: Johan Cruyff Arena; Attendance: 0 Referee: Allard Lindhout

4 April 2021 28	ADO Den Haag	1–4	FC Utrecht	The Hague
14:30 CEST (UTC+2)	Vejinović (yellow card) 66'; Arweiler 72'; De Boer (yellow card) 75'	Report	Kerk 10'; Van Overeem 16'; Boussaid 43'; Maher 74'	Stadium: Cars Jeans Stadion; Attendance: 0 Referee: Dennis Higler

9 April 2021 29	Vitesse	0–0	ADO Den Haag	Arnhem
20:00 CEST (UTC+2)	Tannane (yellow card) 23'; Tronstad (yellow card) 38'	Report	Besuijen (yellow card) 20'; Vejinović (yellow card) 35'; Philipp (yellow card) 57'; Pinas (yellow card) 60'; Zuiverloon (yellow card) 65'; Kemper (yellow card) 90'	Stadium: GelreDome; Attendance: 0 Referee: Jochem Kamphuis

25 April 2021 30	ADO Den Haag	0–3	Fortuna Sittard	The Hague
14:30 CEST (UTC+2)	Vejinović (yellow card) 61'	Report	Cox (yellow card) 30'; Flemming 39'; Polter 48'; Tekie 77'	Stadium: Cars Jeans Stadion; Attendance: 939; Referee: Bas Nijhuis

2 May 2021 31	ADO Den Haag	3–2	Feyenoord	The Hague
12:15 CEST (UTC+2)	Arweiler 13'; Besuijen (yellow card) 15'; El Khayati 30' (pen.), 59'; Van Ewijk (yellow card) 88'; Kramer (yellow card) 89'	Report	Boženík 3', (yellow card) 89'; Senesi (yellow card) 30'; Toornstra (yellow card) 33' (yellow-red card) 90+5'; Jørgensen 70'; Pratto (yellow card) 89'	Stadium: Cars Jeans Stadion; Attendance: 0 Referee: Pol van Boekel

9 May 2021 32	PEC Zwolle	0–1	ADO Den Haag	Zwolle
14:30 CEST (UTC+2)	Bajselmani (yellow card) 19'; Paal (yellow card) 76'	Report	Adekanye 12'; El Khayati (yellow card) 84'; Ćatić (yellow card) 90+1'	Stadium: MAC³PARK Stadion; Attendance: 0 Referee: Jeroen Manschot

13 May 2021 33	ADO Den Haag	1–4	Willem II	The Hague
14:30 CEST (UTC+2)	El Khayati (penalty missed) 38'; Van Ewijk (yellow card) 45+4'; Kramer 69'; Vejinović (yellow card) 88'	Report	Pavlidis 5', 22'; Wriedt 40'; Nunnely 71'; Selahi (yellow card) 73'; Muric (yellow card) 75'	Stadium: Cars Jeans Stadion; Attendance: 0 Referee: Jochem Kamphuis

16 May 2021 34	FC Twente	3–2	ADO Den Haag	Enschede
14:30 CEST (UTC+2)	Rots 40'; Narsingh 45+1' (pen.); Menig (yellow card) 51'; Bosch (yellow card) 71'; Đumić 84'	Report	Goossens 30', 38'; Vejinović (yellow card) 88'	Stadium: De Grolsch Veste; Attendance: 0 Referee: Dennis Higler

=== KNVB Cup ===
28 October 2020 First round	ADO Den Haag	1–1 (a.e.t.) (4–3 p)	Sparta Rotterdam	The Hague
18:45 CET (UTC+1)	Koopmans 90+4'	Report	Gravenberch 39'	Stadium: Cars Jeans Stadion; Attendance: 0 Referee: Siemen Mulder
	Penalties
	Kramer (penalty scored); Karelis (penalty scored); Pinas (penalty scored); Goossens (penalty scored); Ould-Chikh (penalty scored)		(penalty scored) Heylen; (penalty scored) Abels; (penalty missed) Vriends; (penalty scored) Engels

19 January 2021 Round of 16	Vitesse	2–1	ADO Den Haag	Arnhem
18:45 CET (UTC+1)	Openda 25'; Bero 71'	Report	Castillo (yellow card) 54'; Ćatić 81'	Stadium: GelreDome; Attendance: 0 Referee: Dennis Higler
