= Amar Ćatić =

Bosnian footballer

Personal information
- Date of birth: 21 January 1999 (age 27)
- Place of birth: Tilburg, Netherlands
- Height: 1.78 m (5 ft 10 in)
- Position: Winger

Team information
- Current team: Thanh Hóa

Youth career
- DESK
- Willem II
- 2010–2018: PSV

Senior career*
Years	Team	Apps	(Gls)
2018–2020	PSV	1	(0)
2018–2020	Jong PSV	30	(4)
2020–2023	Den Haag	81	(6)
2023–2024	SV Wehen Wiesbaden	22	(1)
2024–2025	Iğdır	4	(0)
2024–2025	→ Çorum (loan)	21	(0)
2026–	Dong A Thanh Hoa	0	(0)

International career^{‡}
2017–2018	Bosnia and Herzegovina U19	7	(1)
2019	Bosnia and Herzegovina U21	2	(0)
- * Club domestic league appearances and goals as of 3 March 2026 ‡ National team caps and goals as of 19 November 2019

Amar Ćatić (Bosnian pronunciation: [ǎmaːr tɕâːtitɕ]; born 21 January 1999) is a Bosnian professional footballer who plays as a winger for V.League 1 club Dong A Thanh Hoa.

Ćatić started his professional career at PSV, playing mainly in its reserve team, before joining Den Haag in 2020.

== Club career ==
=== Early career ===
Ćatić started playing football at a local club DESK, before joining Willem II's youth setup. In 2010, he moved to PSV's youth academy. He made his professional debut in UEFA Europa League play-offs against Apollon Limassol on 29 August 2019 at the age of 20.

In July 2020, he switched to Den Haag.

In summer 2023, Ćatić moved to Germany to play for 2. Bundesliga club SV Wehen Wiesbaden. He was mainly played in the 2023–24 season.

== International career ==
Ćatić represented Bosnia and Herzegovina at various youth levels.

== Career statistics ==
=== Club ===
As of match played 21 October 2022

Appearances and goals by club, season and competition
Club	Season	League			National Cup		Continental		Other		Total	
Club	Season	Division	Apps	Goals	Apps	Goals	Apps	Goals	Apps	Goals	Apps	Goals
Jong PSV	2018–19	Eerste Divisie	13	1	–		–		–		13	1
Jong PSV	2019–20	Eerste Divisie	17	3	–		–		–		17	3
Jong PSV	Total		30	4	–		–		–		30	4
PSV	2019–20	Eredivisie	0	0	0	0	2 (Note: appearances in UEFA Europa League)	0	–		2	0
Den Haag	2020–21	Eredivisie	14	0	1	1	–		–		15	1
Den Haag	2021–22	Eerste Divisie	35	5	3	0	–		5 (Note: appearances in Eerste Divisie promotion play-offs)	0	42	5
Den Haag	2022–23	Eerste Divisie	32	1	4	0	–		–		36	1
Den Haag	Total		81	6	8	1	–		5	0	93	7
Wehen Wiesbaden	2023-24	2. Bundesliga	22	1	0	0	-		1 (Note: appearances in 2. Bundesliga relegation play-offs)	0	23	1
Career total			133	11	8	1	2	0	6	0	146	12
