= Tomislav Gomelt =

Croatian footballer (born 1995)

Personal information
- Date of birth: 7 January 1995 (age 31)
- Place of birth: Sisak, Croatia
- Height: 1.85 m (6 ft 1 in)
- Position: Midfielder

Team information
- Current team: Segesta Sisak
- Number: 14

Youth career
- 2004–2007: Segesta Sisak
- 2007–2011: NK Zagreb
- 2011: HAŠK Zagreb
- 2012–2015: Tottenham Hotspur

Senior career*
Years	Team	Apps	(Gls)
2013–2015	Tottenham Hotspur	0	(0)
2013	→ Espanyol B (loan)	4	(0)
2013–2014	→ FC Antwerp (loan)	3	(0)
2014–2015	→ Bari (loan)	6	(0)
2015–2017	Bari	0	(0)
2015–2017	→ CFR Cluj (loan)	44	(2)
2017–2018	Rijeka	0	(0)
2018	→ Lorca (loan)	14	(0)
2018–2019	Dinamo București	12	(0)
2019–2021	Crotone	22	(1)
2021	ADO Den Haag	10	(1)
2022	Sūduva	3	(0)
2023	Rudeš	3	(0)
2023–	Segesta Sisak	4	(0)

International career
2012–2013	Croatia U19	2	(0)
- * Club domestic league appearances and goals as of 23 February 2024

Tomislav Gomelt (born 7 January 1995) is a Croatian professional footballer who plays as a midfielder for Croatian club Segesta Sisak.

== Club career ==
Gomelt started his youth career at his hometown club Segesta Sisak before moving on to NK Zagreb. A youth international, he drew attention from clubs all over Europe, trialing at Inter Milan, Juventus and Genoa, but was unable to transfer due to bureaucratic reasons and regulations. Another trial followed, at Manchester City, with a similar outcome, and Gomelt moved to HAŠK Zagreb. In the end, Gomelt joined the English Premier League side Tottenham Hotspur and had a spell on loan with Spanish side RCD Espanyol B in 2013 as he was unable to play competitive games on his arrival, because Croatia were outside the EU at the time. Gomelt spent the 2013–14 season on loan at Belgian Second Division outfit Royal Antwerp.

He joined Italian Serie B side Bari on loan in September 2014 and made his professional debut for them in December 2014 playing against Carpi. In July 2015, Gomelt joined Bari on a free transfer after being released by Spurs. On 9 August 2015, he joined Romanian side CFR Cluj on loan. His loan was extended for the 2016–17 season.

On 14 June 2017, Gomelt signed a three-year contract with HNK Rijeka in Croatia. The following 31 January, he was loaned to Segunda División side Lorca FC until June.

He joined Dinamo București in Romania in the summer of 2018.

On 21 January 2019, he moved to Italy, signing a 2.5-year contract with Crotone.

On 18 January 2021, Gomelt signed for Eredivisie side ADO Den Haag.

On 28 January 2022, he signed with Lithuanian side FK Sūduva.

In February 2023, Gomelt returned to Croatia, joining Second Division side Rudeš.

In October 2023, he joined his hometown club, Croatian fourth division side Segesta Sisak.

== Career statistics ==
=== Club ===
As of match played 23 February 2024

Appearances by club, season, and competition
Club	Season	League			National Cup		League Cup		Other		Total	
Club	Season	Division	Apps	Goals	Apps	Goals	Apps	Goals	Apps	Goals	Apps	Goals
Espanyol B (loan)	2012–13	Segunda División B	4	1	0	0	—		—		4	1
Antwerp (loan)	2013–14	Challenger Pro League	3	0	0	0	—		—		3	0
Bari (loan)	2014–15	Serie B	6	0	1	0	—		—		7	0
CFR Cluj (loan)	2015–16	Liga I	25	0	5	0	1	0	—		31	0
Bari	2016–17	Serie B	0	0	1	0	—		—		1	0
CFR Cluj (loan)	2016–17	Liga I	19	2	3	0	0	0	—		22	2
Lorca (loan)	2017–18	Segunda División	14	0	0	0	—		—		14	0
Dinamo București	2018–19	Liga I	12	0	1	0	0	0	—		13	0
Crotone	2018–19	Serie B	3	0	0	0	—		—		3	0
Crotone	2019–20	Serie B	17	1	1	0	—		—		18	1
Crotone	2020–21	Serie A	2	0	0	0	—		—		2	0
Crotone	Total		22	1	1	0	0	0	0	0	23	1
ADO Den Haag	2020–21	Eredivisie	10	1	0	0	—		—		10	1
Sūduva	2022	A Lyga	8	0	0	0	—		1	0	9	0
Rudeš	2022–23	First NL	3	0	0	0	—		—		3	0
Segesta Sisak	2023–24	Third NL – Center	4	0	0	0					4	0
Career total			130	5	12	0	1	0	1	0	144	5

== Honours ==
=== Club ===
CFR Cluj

- Cupa României: 2015–16

FK Sūduva

- Lithuanian Supercup: 2022

NK Rudeš

- First NL: 2022–23
