= Sean Dulic =

German footballer (born 2006)

Personal information
- Date of birth: 6 June 2005 (age 21)
- Place of birth: Munich, Germany
- Height: 1.86 m (6 ft 1 in)
- Position: Centre-back

Team information
- Current team: TSG Hoffenheim
- Number: 4

Youth career
- Wacker München
- 2014–2023: 1860 Munich

Senior career*
Years	Team	Apps	(Gls)
2023–2025	1860 Munich II	19	(2)
2024–2026	1860 Munich	43	(1)
2026–	TSG Hoffenheim	0	(0)

International career^{‡}
2025	Germany U20	6	(0)
- * Club domestic league appearances and goals as of 17:41, 7 July 2026 (UTC) ‡ National team caps and goals as of 17:41, 7 July 2026 (UTC)

Sean Dulic (Bosnian: Dulić; born 5 June 2005) is a German professional footballer who plays as a centre-back for Bundesliga club TSG Hoffenheim.

== Club career ==
A youth product of Wacker München and 1860 Munich, Dulic was promoted to 1860 Munich's senior side on 4 June 2024. He made his senior debut in a 3–0 3. Liga win over Rot-Weiss Essen on 8 December 2024. On 17 June 2025, he moved to TSG 1899 Hoffenheim on a free transfer on a contract until 2028.

== International career ==
Born in Germany, Dulic is of Bosnian descent and holds dual German and Bosnian citizenship. He was called up to the Germany U20s in September 2025.
