= Manuel Pfeifer =

Austrian footballer (born 1999)

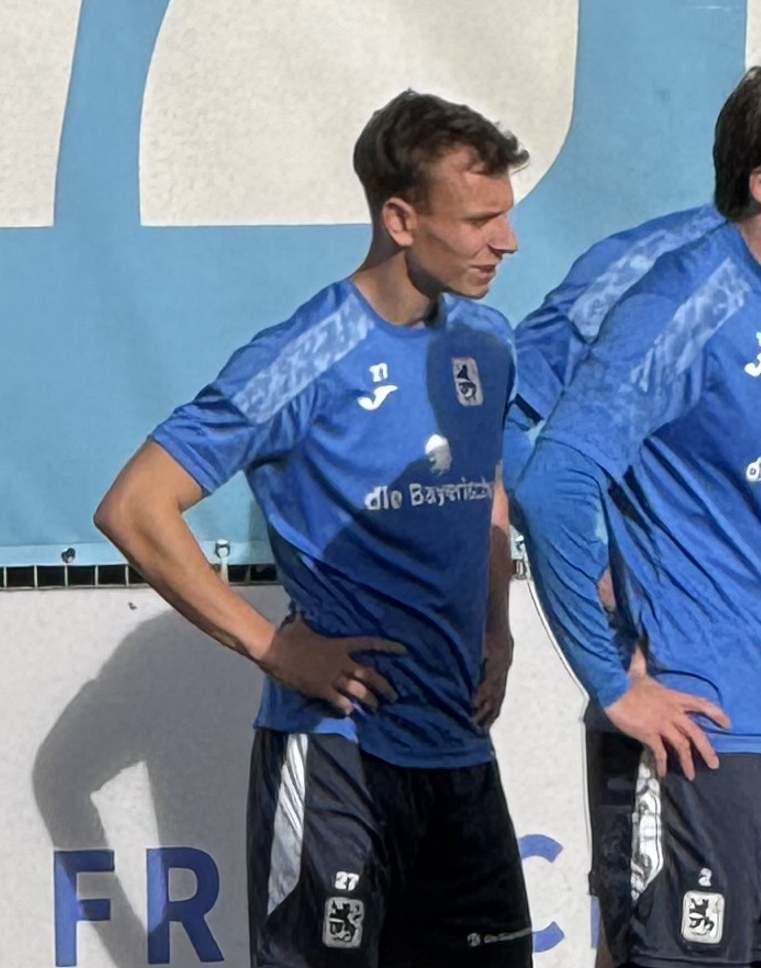
- Pfeifer training with 1860 Munich in 2025

Personal information
- Date of birth: 10 September 1999 (age 27)
- Place of birth: Hartberg, Austria
- Height: 1.78 m (5 ft 10 in)
- Position: Left-back

Team information
- Current team: 1860 Munich
- Number: 27

Youth career
- 2004–2008: USV Rollsdorf
- 2008–2012: SC St. Ruprecht/Raab
- 2012–2013: Grazer AK
- 2013–2016: Sturm Graz

Senior career*
Years	Team	Apps	(Gls)
2016–2019	TSV Hartberg II	59	(5)
2016–2020	TSV Hartberg	1	(0)
2019–2020	→ SV Allerheiligen (loan)	15	(1)
2020–2022	SV Lafnitz II	12	(0)
2021–2023	SV Lafnitz	35	(0)
2023–2025	TSV Hartberg	70	(0)
2025–	1860 Munich	15	(0)
- * Club domestic league appearances and goals as of 28 May 2026

Manuel Pfeifer (born 10 September 1999) is an Austrian professional footballer who plays as a left-back for German club 1860 Munich.

== Career ==
Pfeifer is a youth product of USV Rollsdorf, SC St. Ruprecht/Raab, Grazer AK and Sturm Graz. In 2016, he transferred to TSV Hartberg where he was mostly assigned to their reserves. He made his senior and professional debut with their main team in the Austrian Regionalliga in 2016, his only senior appearance in that stint. On 19 July 2019 he moved to SV Allerheiligen on loan in the Austrian Regionalliga for the 2019–20 season. In the summer of 2020, he moved to SV Lafnitz's reserves, and was promoted to their senior team in the 2. Liga for the 2021–22 season. After becoming a stalwart at Lafnitz, he returned to Hartberg on 3 January 2023 in the Austrian Football Bundesliga, signing a contract until June 2025.

In June 2025, Pfeifer signed with 1860 Munich in German 3. Liga.
