= Justin Steinkötter =

German footballer

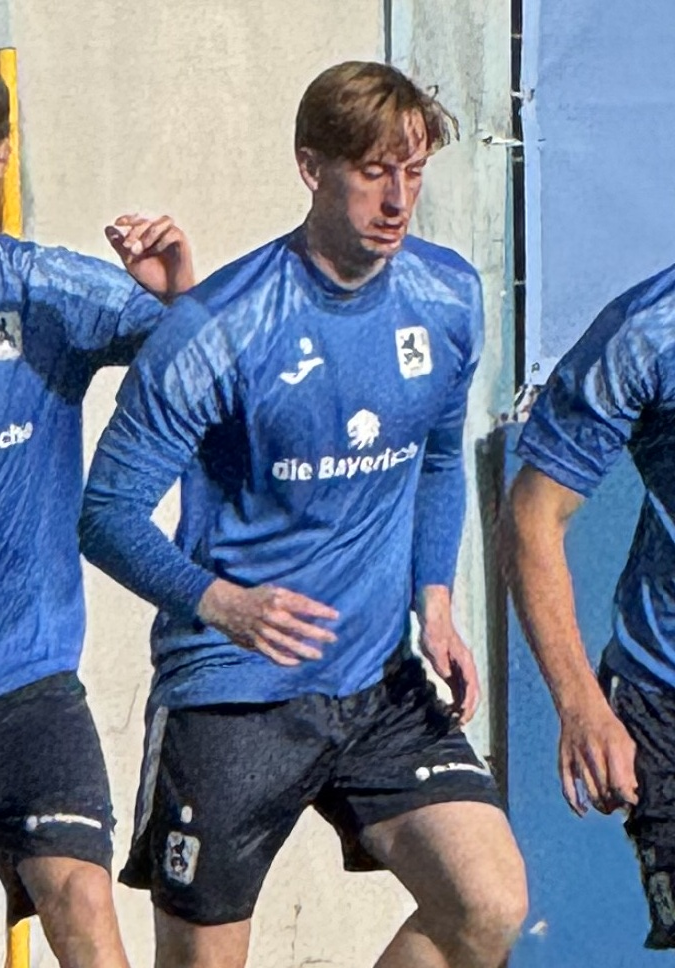
- Steinkötter training with 1860 Munich in 2025

Personal information
- Date of birth: 26 September 1999 (age 27)
- Place of birth: Ennigerloh, Germany
- Height: 1.84 m (6 ft 0 in)
- Position: Forward

Team information
- Current team: SGV Heilbronn-Freiberg
- Number: 9

Youth career
- Preußen Münster

Senior career*
Years	Team	Apps	(Gls)
2017–2018	Preußen Münster	2	(0)
2018–2021	Borussia Mönchengladbach II	89	(23)
2021–2023	1. FC Saarbrücken	46	(5)
2023–2024	Fortuna Köln	34	(9)
2024–2025	TSV Steinbach Haiger	33	(20)
2025–2026	TSV 1860 Munich	24	(1)
2026–	SGV Heilbronn-Freiberg	8	(2)
- * Club domestic league appearances and goals as of 24 September 2026

Justin Steinkötter (born 26 September 1999) is a German professional footballer who plays as a forward for SGV Heilbronn-Freiberg.

== Career ==
=== Preußen Münster ===
In 2016, Steinkötter joined SC Preußen Münster. In the first half of the 2017-18 season, he scored 14 goals in 13 matches (including four in one game against MSV Duisburg) in the Under 19 Bundesliga. He also made two substitute appearances for the first team in the 3. Liga.

=== Borussia Mönchengladbach II ===
In January 2018, Steinkötter joined Borussia Mönchengladbach II. He made his debut in the Under 19 Bundesliga against his former club, Preußen Münster.

=== 1. FC Saarbrücken ===
On 20 May 2021, it was announced that Steinkötter would join 1. FC Saarbrücken on a two-year contract following the 2020–21 season.

=== Fortuna Köln ===
On 30 June 2023, Steinkötter agreed to join Fortuna Köln in Regionalliga West.

=== 1860 Munich ===
In June 2025, Steinkötter moved to TSV 1860 Munich in 3. Liga.
