= TSV Gersthofen =

German football club

- Full name: Turn- und Sportverein 1909 Gersthofen e.V.
- Founded: 1909
- Ground: TSV-Sportarena
- Chairman: Heinrich Habenicht
- Manager: Florian Fischer
- League: Bezirksliga Schwaben-Nord (VII)
- 2018–19: 5th
Home colours	Away colours

The TSV Gersthofen is a German association football club from the town of Gersthofen, Bavaria.

The club's most outstanding achievements were six seasons spend in the third-division Amateurliga Bayern South in the late 1950s and early 1960s and qualifying for the first round of the German Cup in 1980. Experiencing a revival in recent years, TSV achieved promotion back to Bavaria's highest league in 2011 for the first time in almost 50 years.

== History ==
While the club itself dates back to 1909, the football department was only formed in 1926, initially as an independent club, the Eintracht Gersthofen. In 1934, this club then joined TSV Gersthofen.

Eintracht, and later TSV, played in the local amateur leagues of Swabia, never quite breaking through to state level until the late 1950s. Then, in 1957, TSV earned promotion from the 2nd Amateurliga Schwaben to the southern division of the tier-three Amateurliga Bayern. Gersthofen played at this level for six seasons, with a sixth place in 1961 as its best result.

In 1963, the club finished 17th and was relegated. The reorganisation of the German league system because of the introduction of the Fußball-Bundesliga meant that the Amateurliga Bayern was reduced from two to one division and three Landesligas established below, with TSV becoming a founding member of the tier-four Landesliga Bayern-Süd. The club lasted for only one season at this level and was relegated, not to return to this level for another 44 years.

TSV, who had a number of good runs in the Schwaben Cup in the early 1950s, with two cup wins, finished runners up in the competition in 1980, its one outstanding result in this era. Qualified for the German Cup for 1980–81, it made a first round exit when it lost 0–1 to OSC Bremerhaven.

The side became a lower amateur league regular, being a Bezirksliga Schwaben-Nord permanent from 1964 to 1982. In the 1980s, the club briefly dipped down as far as the tier-seven B-Klasse for a season but generally fluctuated between the A-Klasse and the Bezirksliga. A brief change in fortunes came in 2001, when promotion to the Bezirksoberliga Schwaben was earned but the league could not be held. In 2003–04, the club began its return to the more successful days, returning to the Bezirksoberliga for a second time, this time as a top-of-the-table side. TSV finished runners-up twice in three years at this level and managed to earn promotion back to the Landesliga the second time around.

In 2005, the club opened its new stadium, the TSV-Arena.

The first three seasons in the Landesliga became a struggle against relegation but in the fourth season, 2010–11, the team managed to finish second and, through a victory over northern division runners-up SpVgg Selbitz earned promotion back to the Bayernliga, where it was placed in 2011–12. The club experienced some financial trouble during that season and consequently the club declined to apply for a licence for the new Regionalliga Bayern but retained its place in the Bayernliga, entering the southern division of the newly divided league from 2012. At the end of the 2012–13 season TSV was relegated back to the Landesliga, finishing 17th in the southern division of the Bayernliga. After a fourteenth place in the Landesliga in 2014 the club came last in the league the season after and was relegated to the Bezirksliga.

== Honours ==
The club's honours:

=== League ===
- Landesliga Bayern-Süd
  - Runners-up: 2011
- Bezirksoberliga Schwaben
  - Runners-up: (2) 2005, 2006
- Bezirksliga Schwaben-Nord
  - Champions: 2001, 2004
  - Runners-up: 2018

=== Cup ===
- Bavarian Cup
  - Winners: 1952
  - Runners-up: 1954
- Schwaben Cup
  - Winners: (2) 1953, 1954
  - Runners-up: (5) 1951, 1952, 1964, 1980

== Recent seasons ==
The recent season-by-season performance of the club:

Season	Division	Tier	Position
1999–2000	Kreisliga Schwaben-West	VII	1st ↑
2000–01	Bezirksliga Schwaben-Nord	VI	1st ↑
2001–02	Bezirksoberliga Schwaben	V	14th ↓
2002–03	Bezirksliga Schwaben-Nord	VI	3rd
2003–04	Bezirksliga Schwaben-Nord	VI	1st ↑
2004–05	Bezirksoberliga Schwaben	V	4th
2005–06	Bezirksoberliga Schwaben	V	2nd
2006–07	Bezirksoberliga Schwaben	V	2nd ↑
2007–08	Landesliga Bayern-Süd	V	15th
2008–09	Landesliga Bayern-Süd	VI	12th
2009–10	Landesliga Bayern-Süd	VI	13th
2010–11	Landesliga Bayern-Süd	VI	2nd ↑
2011–12	Bayernliga	V	17th
2012–13	Bayernliga Süd	V	17th ↓
2013–14	Landesliga Bayern-Südwest	VI	14th
2014–15	Landesliga Bayern-Südwest	VI	18th ↓
2015–16	Bezirksliga Schwaben-Nord	VII	6th
2016–17	Bezirksliga Schwaben-Nord	VII	4th
2017–18	Bezirksliga Schwaben-Nord	VII	2nd
2018–19	Bezirksliga Schwaben-Nord	VII	5th

- With the introduction of the Bezirksoberligas in 1988 as the new fifth tier, below the Landesligas, all leagues below dropped one tier. With the introduction of the Regionalligas in 1994 and the 3. Liga in 2008 as the new third tier, below the 2. Bundesliga, all leagues below dropped one tier. With the establishment of the Regionalliga Bayern as the new fourth tier in Bavaria in 2012 the Bayernliga was split into a northern and a southern division, the number of Landesligas expanded from three to five and the Bezirksoberligas abolished. All leagues from the Bezirksligas onwards were elevated one tier.

↑ Promoted	↓ Relegated

== DFB Cup appearances ==
The club has qualified for the first round of the German Cup just once, in 1980:

Season	Round	Date	Home	Away	Result	Attendance
1980–81 DFB-Pokal	First round	28 August 1980	TSV Gersthofen	OSC Bremerhaven	0–1	1,200
