= Daniel Hausmann =

German footballer (born 2003)

Personal information
- Date of birth: 12 February 2003 (age 23)
- Place of birth: Leutkirch im Allgäu, Germany
- Position: Midfielder

Team information
- Current team: FV Illertissen
- Number: 13

Youth career
- FC Leutkirch
- –2018: FC Memmingen
- 2018–2021: SpVgg Unterhaching

Senior career*
Years	Team	Apps	(Gls)
2021–2023	SpVgg Unterhaching	34	(3)
2023–2025	FC Augsburg II	61	(9)
2025–	FV Illertissen	21	(7)
- * Club domestic league appearances and goals as of 27 September 2026

Daniel Hausmann (born 12 February 2003) is a German footballer who plays as a midfielder for Regionalliga Bayern club FV Illertissen.

== Career ==
In his youth, Hausmann played for hometown club FC Leutkirch and FC Memmingen, before joining the academy of SpVgg Unterhaching in 2018. He made his professional debut for Unterhaching in the 3. Liga on 6 February 2021, coming on as a substitute in the 88th minute for Alexander Fuchs against SV Meppen. The away match finished as a 3–2 loss.
