= Tim Danhof =

German footballer (born 1997)

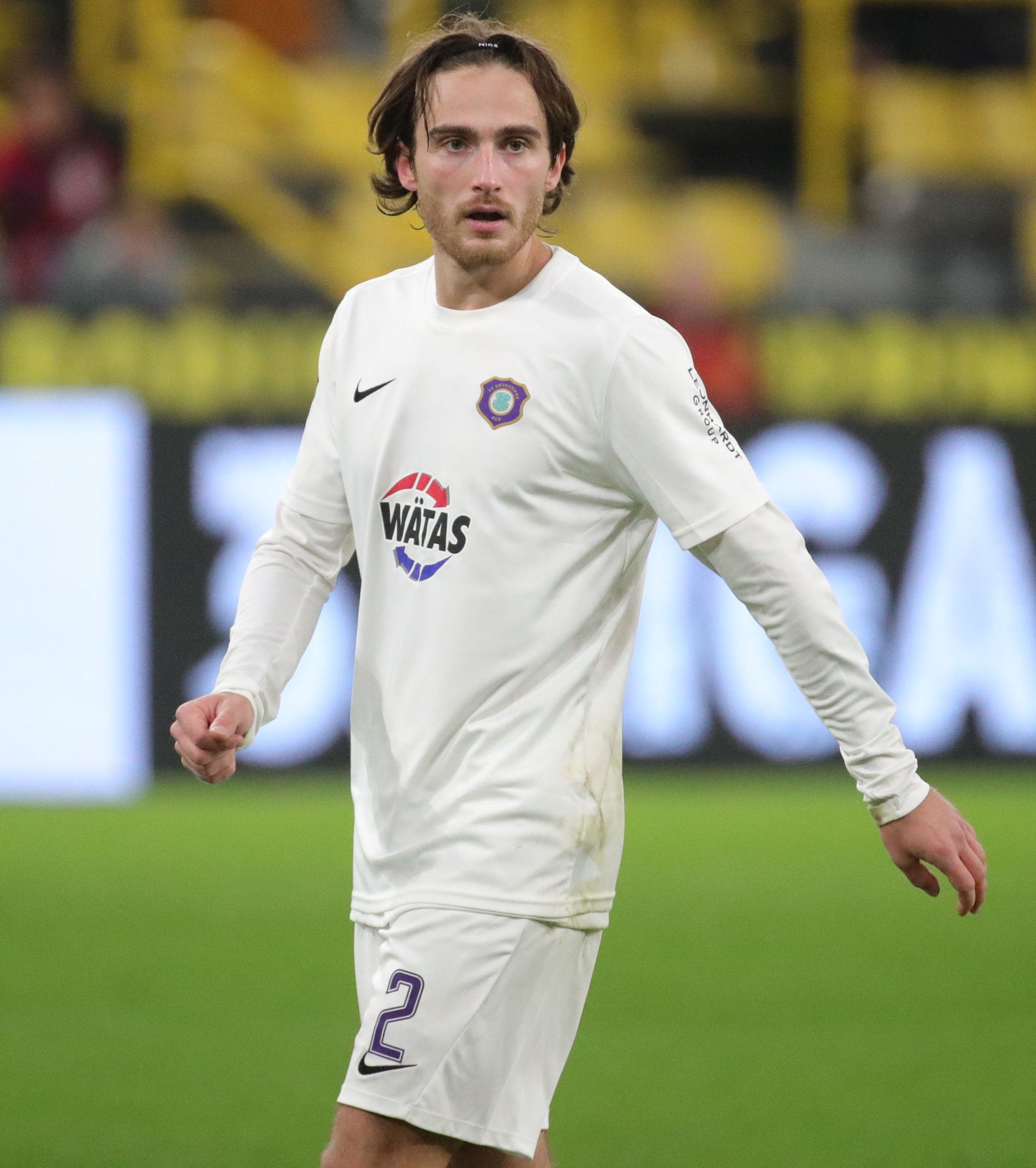
- Danhof playing for Erzgebirge Aue in November 2022

Personal information
- Date of birth: 5 May 1997 (age 29)
- Place of birth: Erlangen, Germany
- Height: 1.82 m (6 ft 0 in)
- Position: Right back

Team information
- Current team: 1860 Munich
- Number: 2

Youth career
- 2001–2008: 1. FC Herzogenaurach
- 2008–2009: FSV Erlangen-Bruck
- 2009–2015: Greuther Fürth

Senior career*
Years	Team	Apps	(Gls)
2015–2019	Greuther Fürth II	58	(8)
2019–2021	Schweinfurt 05	22	(5)
2021–2022	SpVgg Bayreuth	34	(5)
2022–2024	Erzgebirge Aue	66	(5)
2024–	1860 Munich	48	(1)
- * Club domestic league appearances and goals as of 28 May 2026

Tim Danhof (born 5 May 1997) is a German professional footballer who plays as a right back for club 1860 Munich.

== Career ==
Born in Erlangen, Danhof played youth football for 1. FC Herzogenaurach, FSV Erlangen-Bruck and Greuther Fürth. Danhof scored 8 goals in 58 appearances for Greuther Fürth II in the Regionalliga Bayern between 2015 and 2019, before signing for Schweinfurt 05 in summer 2019 on a one-year contract with the option for a further year. In February 2021, he signed for SpVgg Bayreuth, rejoining his former Greuther Fürth youth coach Timo Rost who was manager of the club. He was promoted to the 3. Liga with Bayreuth after the club won the 2021–22 Regionalliga Bayern.

In July 2022, Danhof was signed by ex-manager Rost at 3. Liga club Erzgebirge Aue.

For the 2024–25 season, Danhof signed with 1860 Munich, also in 3. Liga.

== Style of play ==
Danhof plays as a right back, and is noted for his attacking style of play. He has been used as a midfielder at Aue under manager Carsten Müller. He was primarily an attacking player earlier in his career, having been described as "a technically gifted player who can play in all attacking positions" by manager Timo Rost upon signing for Bayreuth in 2021.
