= Raphael Schifferl =

Austrian footballer (born 1999)

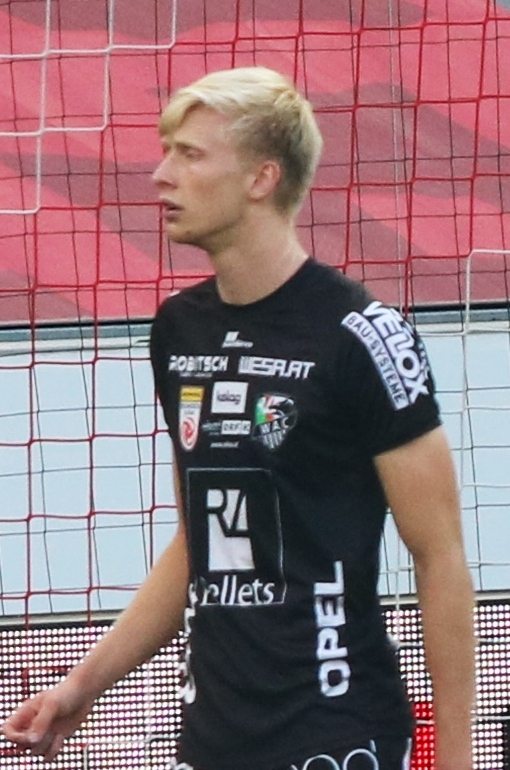
- Schifferl in 2022

Personal information
- Date of birth: 29 July 1999 (age 27)
- Place of birth: Wolfsberg, Austria
- Height: 1.97 m (6 ft 6 in)
- Position: Centre-back

Team information
- Current team: Haugesund
- Number: 37

Youth career
- 2006–2013: ATSV Wolfsberg
- 2013–2014: Wolfsberg
- 2014–2015: Sturm Graz
- 2012–2022: Wolfsberg

Senior career*
Years	Team	Apps	(Gls)
2017–2024	Wolfsberger II	65	(6)
2021–2022	→ Austria Wien II (loan)	26	(1)
2022–2024	Wolfsberger AC	20	(1)
2023–2024	→ SpVgg Unterhaching (loan)	37	(1)
2024–2026	1860 Munich	36	(0)
2026–	Haugesund	4	(0)
- * Club domestic league appearances and goals as of 1 November 2026

Raphael Schifferl (born 29 July 1999) is an Austrian professional footballer who plays as a centre-back for Norwegian club Haugesund.

== Career ==
Schifferl is a youth product of ATSV Wolfsberg, Wolfsberg and Sturm Graz. He began his senior career with the reserves of Wolfsberg in 2017. On 22 June 2021, he joined Austria Wien's reserves on loan for the 2021–22 season. On 5 July 2022, he returned to Wolfsberg and extended his professional contract with them until the summer of 2025. He made his senior and professional debut with Wolfsberg in a 1–1 Austrian Football Bundesliga tie with Sturm Graz on 23 July 2022.

On 28 July 2023, Schifferl joined SpVgg Unterhaching in the German 3. Liga on a season-long loan.

For the 2024–25 season, Shifferl moved to 1860 Munich.

On 10 September 2026, Schifferl joined FK Haugesund in the Norwegian First Division

== Honours ==
SpVgg Unterhaching

- Regionalliga Bayern: 2022–23
