= FV Illertissen =

German football club

- Full name: Fußballverein Illertissen e.V.
- Founded: 1921
- Ground: Voehlin-Stadium Illertissen
- Capacity: 3,000
- Chairman: Rainer Bleser
- Manager: Walid Khaled
- League: Regionalliga Bayern (IV)
- 2025–26: Regionalliga Bayern, 4th of 18
Home colours	Away colours

FV Illertissen is a German association football club from the town of Illertissen, Bavaria and was established in 1921. Despite its location in Bavaria the club had never played in the league system of its home state but instead preferred to play in neighbouring Baden-Württemberg. At the end of the 2011–12 season the club however decided to switch to Bavaria.

== History ==
Although the town of Illertissen is in Bavaria, its proximity to other towns in the neighbouring state of Baden-Württemberg has allowed it to participate in that state's competition. In 1963, it became the first Bavarian team to win the Württembergischen-Pokal (Württemberg Cup) when they defeated SV Hussenhofen.

The club has played as a lower division side for most of its history. It won promotion to the Landesliga Württemberg I (VI) in 1979 and played there until 1987. After slipping briefly into the Bezirksliga (VII), the club returned to the Landesliga, and in 2003 advanced for the first time to the Verbandsliga.

A rivalry exists with SpVgg Au/Iller, which is in the same district as Illertissen. After several years playing against each other in the Verbandsliga Württemberg (V), both teams were promoted to the Oberliga Baden-Württemberg (V) in 2008. Au had some seasons earlier become the first Bavarian side to play in Baden-Württemberg and Illertissen followed its rival. The club qualified for the Oberliga through a promotion round playoff, alongside Kehler FV.

In December 2011 the club decided to switch to the Bavarian league system from the 2012–13 season onwards. The reason for the switch was the introduction of the Regionalliga Bayern, which the club only needed to finish ninth or better in 2011–12 to qualify for. A fourth place in the Oberliga in 2011–12 allowed the club to qualify for the new Regionalliga. In the 2012–13, in the Regionalliga, the club finished in third place and, as the best placed non-reserve team in the league, qualified for the first round of the German Cup.

The club was once more the best non-reserve side in the Regionalliga Bayern in 2013–14, finishing second behind FC Bayern Munich II and once more qualifying for the first round of the German Cup. Illertissen lost after extra time to Werder Bremen in the first round but received a €140,000 starting fee and the gate receipts for the game in prizes.

== Current squad ==
As of 25 September 2026

Note: Flags indicate national team as defined under FIFA eligibility rules; some limited exceptions apply. Players may hold more than one non-FIFA nationality.

No.	Pos.	Nation	Player
1	GK	GER	Daniel Adamczyk
2	DF	TUR	Emirhan Delikaya
4	MF	GER	Ben Kronenberg
5	MF	LIE	Alessio Hasler
6	MF	GER	Luca Fink
7	FW	GER	Mussa Fofanah
9	FW	KOS	Elidon Qenaj
10	MF	GER	Shaban Veselaj
11	MF	BIH	Denis Milic
12	DF	GER	Nikola Stojinovic
13	MF	GER	Daniel Hausmann
14	DF	GER	Flemming Schug
15	DF	GER	Patrick Ekinci

No.	Pos.	Nation	Player
17	FW	GER	Nino Cassaniti
19	DF	GER	Jordi Wegmann
20	DF	GER	Constantin Pauly
21	MF	GER	Iljas El Hadj-Safi
22	DF	FRA	Odin Redier
23	DF	GER	Eduard Heckmann
25	MF	GER	Marco Hingerl (captain)
27	FW	TUR	İlkan Atak
28	GK	GER	Leon Madarac
33	GK	GER	Jakob Mayer
38	DF	GER	Maximilian Neuberger
—	DF	GER	Ole Deininger

== Honours ==
The club's honours:

=== League ===
- Regionalliga Bayern
  - Runners-up: 2013-14

=== Cup ===
- Württemberg Cup
  - Winners: 1962-63
- Bavarian Cup
  - Winners: 2021-22, 2022-23, 2024-25

== Recent managers ==
Recent managers of the club:

Manager	Start	Finish
Karl-Heinz Bachthaler	2000	30 June 2012
Holger Bachthaler	1 July 2012	present

== Recent seasons ==
The recent season-by-season performance of the club:

Season	Division	Tier	Position
2002–03	Landesliga Württemberg	VI	↑
2003–04	Verbandsliga Württemberg	V	11th
2004–05	Verbandsliga Württemberg	V	6th
2005–06	Verbandsliga Württemberg	V	7th
2006–07	Verbandsliga Württemberg	V	9th
2007–08	Verbandsliga Württemberg	V	3rd ↑
2008–09	Oberliga Baden-Württemberg	V	8th
2009–10	Oberliga Baden-Württemberg	V	4th
2010–11	Oberliga Baden-Württemberg	V	7th
2011–12	Oberliga Baden-Württemberg	V	4th ↑
2012–13	Regionalliga Bayern	IV	3rd
2013–14	Regionalliga Bayern	IV	2nd
2014–15	Regionalliga Bayern	IV	9th
2015–16	Regionalliga Bayern	IV	5th
2016–17	Regionalliga Bayern	IV	5th
2017–18	Regionalliga Bayern	IV	10th
2018–19	Regionalliga Bayern	IV	7th
2019-20	Regionalliga Bayern	IV	12th
2020-21	Regionalliga Bayern	IV	12th
2021-22	Regionalliga Bayern	IV	7th
2022-23	Regionalliga Bayern	IV	9th
2023-24	Regionalliga Bayern	IV	5th
2024-25	Regionalliga Bayern	IV	9th
2025–26	Regionalliga Bayern	IV	4th

- With the introduction of the Regionalligas in 1994 and the 3. Liga in 2008 as the new third tier, below the 2. Bundesliga, all leagues below dropped one tier.

=== Key ===
↑ Promoted	↓ Relegated

== DFB Cup appearances ==
The club has qualified for the first round of the German Cup four times:

Season	Round	Date	Home	Away	Result	Attendance
2013–14 DFB-Pokal	First round	2 August 2013	FV Illertissen	Eintracht Frankfurt	0–2	6,000
2014–15 DFB-Pokal	First round	17 August 2014	FV Illertissen	Werder Bremen	2–3 aet	10,205
2022–23 DFB-Pokal	First round	30 July 2022	FV Illertissen	1. FC Heidenheim	0–2	3,500
2023–24 DFB-Pokal	First round	13 August 2023	FV Illertissen	Fortuna Düsseldorf	1–3	3,719
