= Maximilian Neuberger =

German footballer

Personal information
- Date of birth: 23 March 2000 (age 26)
- Place of birth: Illertissen, Germany
- Height: 1.88 m (6 ft 2 in)
- Position: Defender

Team information
- Current team: FV Illertissen
- Number: 38

Youth career
- –2018: FV Illertissen
- 2018–2019: FC Ingolstadt

Senior career*
Years	Team	Apps	(Gls)
2019–2023	FC Ingolstadt II	36	(0)
2021–2023	FC Ingolstadt	19	(0)
2023–	FV Illertissen	99	(2)
- * Club domestic league appearances and goals as of 27 September 2026

Maximilian Neuberger (born 23 April 2000) is a German professional footballer who plays as a defender for Regionalliga Bayern club FV Illertissen.
