= Elias Löder =

German footballer (born 2000)

Personal information
- Date of birth: 25 April 2000 (age 26)
- Place of birth: Wernigerode, Germany
- Height: 1.83 m (6 ft 0 in)
- Position: Midfielder

Team information
- Current team: Carl Zeiss Jena
- Number: 18

Youth career
- –2015: 1. FC Magdeburg
- 2015–2019: Erzgebirge Aue

Senior career*
| Years | Team | Apps | (Gls) |
| 2019–2021 | Germania Halberstadt | 32 | (9) |
| 2021–2023 | Hallescher FC | 32 | (1) |
| 2023–2025 | Carl Zeiss Jena | 47 | (29) |
| 2025–2026 | SSV Ulm | 37 | (10) |
| 2026– | Carl Zeiss Jena | 10 | (2) |
- * Club domestic league appearances and goals as of 23 September 2026

Elias Löder (born 25 April 2000) is a German professional footballer who plays as a midfielder for Carl Zeiss Jena.

== Career ==
On 28 May 2025, Löder signed a two-year contract with SSV Ulm.
