= Ivan Prtajin =

Croatian footballer

Personal information
- Date of birth: 14 May 1996 (age 30)
- Place of birth: Zadar, Croatia
- Height: 1.89 m (6 ft 2 in)
- Position: Forward

Team information
- Current team: 1. FC Kaiserslautern
- Number: 9

Youth career
- 2006–2008: Primorac Biograd
- 2009–2011: Arbanasi
- 2011–2012: Trešnjevka
- 2012–2014: NK Zagreb
- 2014–2017: Udinese

Senior career*
| Years | Team | Apps | (Gls) |
| 2017–2019 | Hajduk Split | 1 | (0) |
| 2017–2019 | Hajduk Split II | 40 | (19) |
| 2018 | → Dugopolje (loan) | 13 | (4) |
| 2019–2020 | Roda JC | 17 | (0) |
| 2020–2022 | FC Schaffhausen | 52 | (23) |
| 2022 | Olimpija Ljubljana | 19 | (4) |
| 2022–2024 | Wehen Wiesbaden | 58 | (28) |
| 2024–2025 | Union Berlin | 5 | (0) |
| 2025– | 1. FC Kaiserslautern | 14 | (11) |

International career
| 2015 | Croatia U19 | 2 | (0) |
- * Club domestic league appearances and goals as of 18 May 2026

Ivan Prtajin (born 14 May 1996) is a Croatian professional footballer who plays as a forward for German 2. Bundesliga club 1. FC Kaiserslautern.

== Club career ==
=== Early career ===
Prtajin started his career with the youth academy of Primorac. After playing for the youth academies of Arbanasi and Trešnjevka, he moved to the youth team of NK Zagreb at the age of 16. After two seasons with the youth team, he moved to Italian club Udinese in 2014 where he was assigned to Udinese Primavera (the reserve team). He made a total of 49 appearances for the reserves and scored 22 goals. His only involvement with the first team was being an unused substitute in a 4–3 defeat against Cagliari Calcio.

=== Hadjuk Split ===
By the end of 2016, Prtajin started training with Croatian club Hajduk Split. He featured in a number of friendlies for the club. In one of the friendlies against Jadran, he scored four goals. He finally signed for the club on 18 January 2017. He made his debut for the club in a 2–1 victory over Slaven Belupo where he substituted Ante Erceg in the extra time.

On 27 July 2020, Prtajin joined Swiss club FC Schaffhausen on a two-year contract. He transferred to Slovenian club NK Olimpija Ljubljana in January 2022.

=== Germany ===
In August 2022, Prtajin signed for German 3. Liga club Wehen Wiesbaden on a two-year contract. He scored 15 goals and provided 5 assists in 27 matches during the 2022–23 season as Wehen were promoted to the 2. Bundesliga, and his contract with the club was extended at the end of the season.

In June 2024, Prtajin signed for Bundesliga club Union Berlin.

On 11 June 2025, Prtajin moved to 1. FC Kaiserslautern in 2. Bundesliga.

== Personal life ==
In July 2017, a fire broke out in Dugopolje, a city where Hajduk Split players trained. Prtajin, along with Toma Bašić, Josip Juranović, Zvonimir Milić and Jerko Šeparović, joined the firefighters in extinguishing the fire.

== Career statistics ==
As of match played 15 February 2025

Appearances and goals by club, season and competition
| Club | Season | League | | | National cup | | Other | | Total | |
| Club | Season | Division | Apps | Goals | Apps | Goals | Apps | Goals | Apps | Goals |
|---|---|---|---|---|---|---|---|---|---|---|
| Hajduk Split | 2016–17 | Croatian Football League | 1 | 0 | 0 | 0 | 0 | 0 | 1 | 0 |
| Hajduk Split II | 2017–18 | First Football League | 13 | 2 | — | | — | | 13 | 2 |
| Hajduk Split II | 2018–19 | First Football League | 12 | 6 | — | | — | | 12 | 6 |
| Hajduk Split II | Total | | 25 | 8 | — | | — | | 25 | 8 |
| Dugopolje (loan) | 2017–18 | First Football League | 13 | 4 | — | | — | | 13 | 4 |
| Roda JC | 2019–20 | Eerste Divisie | 16 | 0 | 2 | 0 | — | | 18 | 0 |
| FC Schaffhausen | 2020–21 | Swiss Challenge League | 34 | 14 | 1 | 0 | — | | 35 | 14 |
| FC Schaffhausen | 2021–22 | Swiss Challenge League | 18 | 9 | 3 | 2 | — | | 21 | 11 |
| FC Schaffhausen | Total | | 52 | 23 | 4 | 2 | — | | 56 | 25 |
| Olimpija Ljubljana | 2021–22 | Slovenian PrvaLiga | 18 | 4 | 0 | 0 | — | | 18 | 4 |
| Olimpija Ljubljana | 2022–23 | Slovenian PrvaLiga | 1 | 0 | 0 | 0 | 4 (Note: Appearances in UEFA Conference League) | 0 | 5 | 0 |
| Olimpija Ljubljana | Total | | 19 | 4 | 0 | 0 | 4 | 0 | 23 | 4 |
| Wehen Wiesbaden | 2022–23 | 3. Liga | 27 | 15 | 2 | 1 | 2 (Note: Appearances in relegation play-off) | 1 | 31 | 17 |
| Wehen Wiesbaden | 2023–24 | 2. Bundesliga | 31 | 13 | 1 | 2 | 2 | 1 | 34 | 16 |
| Wehen Wiesbaden | Total | | 58 | 28 | 3 | 3 | 4 | 2 | 65 | 33 |
| Union Berlin | 2024–25 | Bundesliga | 5 | 0 | — | | — | | 5 | 0 |
| Career total | | | 188 | 67 | 9 | 5 | 8 | 2 | 206 | 74 |
