= Max Reinthaler =

Italian footballer

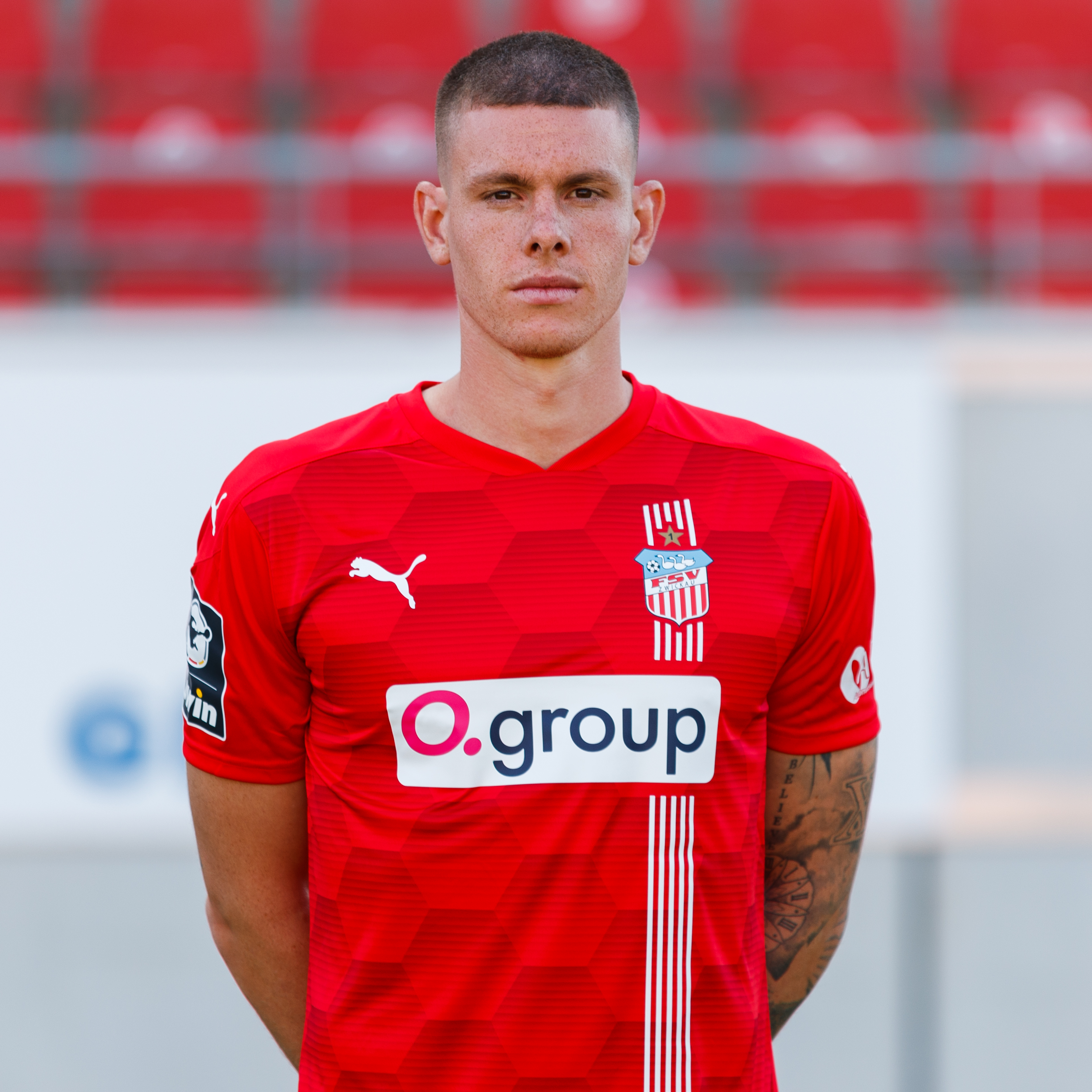
- Reinthaler in 2021

Personal information
- Full name: Maximilian Reinthaler
- Date of birth: 22 March 1995 (age 31)
- Place of birth: Bolzano, Italy
- Height: 1.93 m (6 ft 4 in)
- Position: Midfielder

Team information
- Current team: TSV 1860 Munich
- Number: 16

Youth career
- –2009: Südtirol
- 2009–2013: Udinese

Senior career*
Years	Team	Apps	(Gls)
2012–2013	Udinese	0	(0)
2013–2014	TSV Gersthofen	12	(5)
2014	Rydaholms GoIF	7	(2)
2014–2018	FC Augsburg II	68	(2)
2018–2021	Hansa Rostock	33	(0)
2018–2020	Hansa Rostock II	8	(1)
2021–2022	FSV Zwickau	31	(1)
2022–2024	SV Wehen Wiesbaden	31	(4)
2024–	TSV 1860 Munich	49	(2)
- * Club domestic league appearances and goals as of 24 May 2026

Maximilian "Max" Reinthaler (born 22 March 1995) is an Italian professional footballer who plays as a midfielder for German club TSV 1860 Munich.

== Club career ==
=== Early career ===
Reinthaler was born in Bolzano, Italy. He made his debut on 6 December 2012 with Udinese in the Europa League against Liverpool. Although being part of the Serie A squad on several occasions, he never earned a cap.

In Summer 2013, Reinthaler had trials with both SC Freiburg and Red Bull Salzburg. However, due to compensation demands by Udinese, no agreement was reached. In order to evade Udinese's claims, Reinthaler regained amateur status by joining German sixth tier club TSV Gersthofen. While playing for Gersthofen he scored five goals in twelve appearances.

From April to July 2014, Reinthaler enjoyed a short spell at Swedish fifth tier club Rydaholms GoIF. In an interview he claimed that the offer he had received by Rydaholm had been too lucrative.

=== FC Augsburg ===
In July 2014, it was announced that Reinthaler had signed for German side FC Augsburg on a four-year contract, running until 2018. He was assigned to the second team, playing in the Regionalliga Bayern, but will occasionally train with the first team. He also takes part in the first team's training camp and first team's friendly fixtures. He made 24 appearances in the 2014–15 season, 17 appearances in the 2015–16 season, nine appearances in the 2016–17 season, and 18 appearances in the 2017–18 season.

=== Hansa Rostock ===
Reinthaler signed for Hansa Rostock on 18 June 2018. He made his club debut on 18 August 2018 when he came on as a substitute in the 89th minute in the first round of the German Cup against VfB Stuttgart. On 8 July 2020, Reinthaler extended his contract for another season.

=== FSV Zwickau ===
Reinthaler signed a two-year contract with FSV Zwickau.

=== SV Wehen Wiesbaden ===
On 1 July 2022, Reinthaler joined SV Wehen Wiesbaden.

=== TSV 1860 Munich ===
On 31 January 2024, Reinthaler signed with 3. Liga club TSV 1860 Munich.

== Personal life ==
His hometown is Bolzano in South Tyrol, Italy. His first language is German.

== Career statistics ==
As of matches played on 20 May 2023.

Appearances and goals by club, season and competition
Club	Season	League			Cup (Note: Includes appearances in the DFB-Pokal, Landespokal MV and Landespokal Sachsen.)		Continental (Note: Appearances in the UEFA Europa League.)		Total		Ref.
Club	Season	Division	Apps	Goals	Apps	Goals	Apps	Goals	Apps	Goals	Ref.
Udinese	2012–13	Serie A	0	0	0	0	1	0	1	0	
TSV Gersthofen	2013–14	Landesliga Bayern-Südwest	12	5	—		—		12	5	
Rydaholms GoIF	2014	Division 4	7	2	—		—		7	2	
FC Augsburg II	2014–15	Regionalliga Bayern	24	0	—		—		24	0	
FC Augsburg II	2015–16	Regionalliga Bayern	17	0	—		—		17	0	
FC Augsburg II	2016–17	Regionalliga Bayern	9	1	—		—		9	1	
FC Augsburg II	2017–18	Regionalliga Bayern	18	1	—		—		18	1	
FC Augsburg II	Total		68	2	0	0	0	0	68	2	—
Hansa Rostock	2018–19	3. Liga	4	0	5	0	—		9	0	
Hansa Rostock	2019–20	3. Liga	22	0	2	1	—		24	1	
Hansa Rostock	2020–21	3. Liga	7	0	0	0	—		7	0	
Hansa Rostock	Total		33	0	7	1	0	0	40	1	—
Hansa Rostock II	2018–19	NOFV-Oberliga Nord	7	0	—		—		7	0	
Hansa Rostock II	2020–21	NOFV-Oberliga Nord	1	1	—		—		1	1	
Hansa Rostock II	Total		8	1	0	0	0	0	8	1	
FSV Zwickau	2021–22	3. Liga	31	1	4	0	—		35	1	
SV Wehen Wiesbaden	2022–23	3. Liga	29	3	0	0	—		29	3	
Career total			180	12	11	1	1	0	192	13	—
