= Marvin Rittmüller =

German footballer

Personal information
- Full name: Marvin Lee Rittmüller
- Date of birth: 7 March 1999 (age 27)
- Place of birth: Erfurt, Germany
- Height: 1.77 m (5 ft 10 in)
- Position: Defender

Team information
- Current team: Stal Rzeszów
- Number: 27

Youth career
- 2004–2016: Rot-Weiß Erfurt
- 2016–2018: 1. FC Köln

Senior career*
Years	Team	Apps	(Gls)
2018–2020	1. FC Köln II	53	(2)
2020–2023	1. FC Heidenheim	36	(0)
2023–2025	Eintracht Braunschweig	49	(0)
2025–2026	1860 Munich	29	(1)
2026–	Stal Rzeszów	0	(0)

International career
2016–2017	Germany U18	4	(0)
- * Club domestic league appearances and goals as of 28 May 2026

Marvin Lee Rittmüller (born 7 March 1999) is a German professional footballer who plays as a defender for I liga club Stal Rzeszów.

== Career ==
Rittmüller made his professional debut for 1. FC Heidenheim in the 2. Bundesliga on 27 September 2020, coming on as a substitute in the 57th minute for Florian Pick against FC St. Pauli, with the away match finishing as a 4–2 loss.

On 1 September 2025, Rittmüller signed with 1860 Munich in 3. Liga.

On 22 July 2026, Rittmüller joined Polish club Stal Rzeszów on a one-year contract.
