= David Philipp (footballer) =

German footballer (born 2000)

Personal information
- Full name: David Lennart Philipp
- Date of birth: 10 April 2000 (age 26)
- Place of birth: Hamburg, Germany
- Height: 1.80 m (5 ft 11 in)
- Position: Midfielder

Team information
- Current team: Jahn Regensburg
- Number: 8

Youth career
- –2014: HEBC
- 2014–2019: Werder Bremen

Senior career*
Years	Team	Apps	(Gls)
2019–2021	Werder Bremen II	18	(7)
2020–2021	→ ADO Den Haag (loan)	15	(2)
2021–2024	Viktoria Köln	74	(15)
2024–2026	1860 Munich	61	(6)
2026–	Jahn Regensburg	7	(1)

International career
2017–2018	Germany U18	6	(2)
2018	Germany U19	3	(1)
- * Club domestic league appearances and goals as of 14:30, 26 September 2026 (UTC)

David Lennart Philipp (born 10 April 2000) is a German professional footballer who plays as a midfielder for 3. Liga club Jahn Regensburg.

== Career ==
Philipp joined Werder Bremen's youth academy from Hamburg-based club HEBC in 2014. The 2019–20 season was his first in senior football and he scored seven goals in 18 Regionalliga Nord matches for the club's reserves.

In September 2020, Philipp joined Eredivisie club ADO Den Haag on loan for the 2020–21 season. The deal includes an option for ADO to sign him permanently and one for Werder Bremen to re-sign him. He made his debut for the club on 3 October, scoring the winner in injury time in a 2–1 league win against VVV-Venlo.

On 16 May 2021, Philipp signed for 3. Liga club Viktoria Köln. He agreed a contract extension in May 2023.

For the 2024–25 season, Philipp moved to 1860 Munich.

After two seasons, he joined Jahn Regensburg.
