= Thore Jacobsen =

German footballer

Personal information
- Full name: Thore-Andreas Jacobsen
- Date of birth: 19 April 1997 (age 29)
- Place of birth: Henstedt-Ulzburg, Germany
- Height: 1.82 m (6 ft 0 in)
- Positions: Defensive midfielder; left-back

Team information
- Current team: 1860 Munich
- Number: 5

Youth career
- –2009: TSV Nahe
- 2009–2015: Hamburger SV
- 2015–2016: Werder Bremen

Senior career*
Years	Team	Apps	(Gls)
2015–2022	Werder Bremen II	100	(5)
2019–2020	→ 1. FC Magdeburg (loan)	32	(1)
2020–2021	→ 1. FC Magdeburg (loan)	33	(0)
2022–2024	SV Elversberg	67	(9)
2024–	1860 Munich	68	(11)
- * Club domestic league appearances and goals as of 28 May 2026

Thore-Andreas Jacobsen (born 19 April 1997) is a German professional footballer who plays as a defensive midfielder for club 1860 Munich.

== Career ==
Jacobsen was born in Henstedt-Ulzburg, Germany. He began his youth career at TSV Nahe before moving to Hamburger SV in 2009. In 2015, he moved to rivals Werder Bremen, where he joined the second and U-19 teams, where he is most often used as a midfielder. He made his 3. Liga debut off the bench on 5 September 2015 in a 3–1 loss to Preußen Münster.

In March 2018, Jacobsen agreed a contract extension with Werder Bremen, making it his first contract on professional terms.

Jacobsen moved to 3. Liga side 1. FC Magdeburg on loan for the 2019–20 season in June 2019. Having returned to Werder Bremen in the summer 2020, he was linked with a move to a 2. Bundesliga club. In September, however, he re-joined 1. FC Magdeburg on loan for the season.

On 30 June 2022, Jacobsen joined recently promoted 3. Liga club SV Elversberg on a two-year contract.

For the 2024–25 season, Jacobsen joined 1860 Munich.
