= 2024–25 TSV 1860 Munich season =

TSV 1860 Munich
2024–25 season
- President: Robert Reisinger
- Head Coach: Argirios Giannikis (until 20 January); Patrick Glöckner (from 21 January)
- Stadium: Grünwalder Stadion
- 3. Liga: 11th
- Bavarian Cup: Quarter-finals
- Top goalscorer: League: Patrick Hobsch (11); All: Patrick Hobsch (16)
- Highest home attendance: 15,000 (in 19 matches)
- Lowest home attendance: 12,470 vs SpVgg Unterhaching, Bavarian Cup, 16 November 2024
- Average home league attendance: 15,000
Home colours	Away colours	Third colours

The 2024–25 season was the 126th season in the history of TSV 1860 Munich, and the club's second consecutive season in 3. Liga. In addition to the domestic league, the team participate in the Bavarian Cup.

== Season events ==
On 20 May 1860 announced that they had signed Florian Bähr on loan from VfL Osnabrück for the season.

On 20 January 1860 announced that they had parted company with Head Coach Argirios Giannikis, and that Patrick Glöckner had been appointed as the clubs new Head Coach.

On 3 February 1860 announced that they had signed Dickson Abiama on loan from 1. FC Kaiserslautern for the remainder of the season.

On 21 April 1860 announced that they had re-signed Kevin Volland for the 2025–26 season.

On 5 May 1860 announced that they had re-signed Kilian Jakob for the 2025–26 season.

On 11 May 1860 announced that Marco Hiller would leave the club at the end of the season after his contract expires, ending 17-years with the club.

On 12 May 1860 announced that they had signed Florian Niederlechner for the 2025–26 season.

On 15 May 1860 announced that they had extended their contract with Patrick Glöckner for the 2025–26 season.

On 17 May, prior to their last game of the season, at home to Erzgebirge Aue, 1860 announced that Leroy Kwadwo, Marlon Frey, Tim Kloss, Erion Avdija, Moritz Bangerter and Raphael Ott would all be leaving the club at the end of the season alongside Marco Hiller.

On 22 May 1860 announced that they had extended their contract with Sean Dulic for the 2025–26 season.

On 27 May 1860 announced that they had agreed a deal with Greuther Fürth for the transfer of Lukas Reich.

== Squad ==
As of match played 17 May 2025

No.	Name	Nationality	Position	Date of birth (age)	Signed from	Signed in	Contract ends	Apps.	Goals
Goalkeepers
1	Marco Hiller	(Germany)	GK	20 February 1997 (aged 28)	Academy	2016		266	0
11	René Vollath	(Germany)	GK	20 March 1990 (aged 35)	SpVgg Unterhaching	2024		12	0
23	Erion Avdija	(Kosovo)	GK	13 March 2005 (aged 20)	Academy	2024		0	0
Defenders
2	Tim Danhof	(Germany)	DF	5 May 1997 (aged 28)	Erzgebirge Aue	2024		23	1
3	Anderson Lucoqui	(Angola)	DF	6 July 1997 (aged 27)	Eintracht Braunschweig	2025		12	0
4	Jesper Verlaat	(Netherlands)	DF	4 June 1996 (aged 28)	Waldhof Mannheim	2022		107	8
16	Max Reinthaler	(Italy)	DF	22 March 1995 (aged 30)	Wehen Wiesbaden	2024		30	4
20	Lukas Reich	(Germany)	DF	24 October 2006 (aged 18)	Wehen Wiesbaden	2023		39	1
21	Leroy Kwadwo	(Germany)	DF	15 August 1996 (aged 28)	MSV Duisburg	2023		59	3
24	Raphael Schifferl	(Austria)	DF	29 July 1999 (aged 25)	Wolfsberger AC	2024		19	0
25	Sean Dulic	(Germany)	DF	5 June 2005 (aged 19)	Academy	2024	2026	22	0
28	Florian Bähr	(Germany)	DF	18 February 2003 (aged 22)	on loan from VfL Osnabrück	2024	2025	20	0
Midfielders
5	Thore Jacobsen	(Germany)	MF	19 April 1997 (aged 28)	SV Elversberg	2024		37	5
8	David Philipp	(Germany)	MF	10 April 2000 (aged 25)	Viktoria Köln	2024		34	3
17	Morris Schröter	(Germany)	MF	20 August 1995 (aged 29)	Hansa Rostock	2023		52	8
18	Tim Kloss	(Germany)	MF	5 June 2004 (aged 20)	Academy	2023		26	1
22	Mike Gevorgyan	(Germany)	MF	1 June 2005 (aged 19)	Academy	2024		2	0
26	Philipp Maier	(Germany)	MF	14 June 1994 (aged 30)	SSV Ulm 1846	2025		13	0
32	Moritz Bangerter	(Germany)	MF	3 December 2004 (aged 20)	Academy	2024		4	0
36	Tunay Deniz	(Germany)	MF	2 February 1994 (aged 31)	Hallescher FC	2024		39	9
37	Marlon Frey	(Germany)	MF	24 March 1996 (aged 29)	MSV Duisburg	2023		54	4
49	Emre Erdoğan	(Turkey)	MF	24 February 2007 (aged 18)	Academy	2025		1	0
Forwards
7	Julian Guttau	(Germany)	FW	29 October 1999 (aged 25)	SC Freiburg II	2023		75	15
9	Dickson Abiama	(Nigeria)	FW	3 November 1998 (aged 26)	on loan from 1. FC Kaiserslautern	2025	2025	16	2
10	Fabian Schubert	(Austria)	FW	29 August 1994 (aged 30)	St. Gallen	2024		27	7
14	Sōichirō Kōzuki	(Japan)	FW	22 December 2000 (aged 24)	Schalke 04	2024		33	3
27	Raphael Ott	(Germany)	FW	15 December 2005 (aged 19)	Academy	2024		18	8
30	Maximilian Wolfram	(Germany)	FW	21 February 1997 (aged 28)	SC Verl	2024		38	9
34	Patrick Hobsch	(Germany)	FW	10 October 1994 (aged 30)	SpVgg Unterhaching	2024		40	16
Out on loan
39	Eliot Muteba	(Angola)	FW	20 June 2003 (aged 21)	1. FC Nürnberg II	2024		12	3
Left during the season

== Transfers ==
=== In ===
Date	Position	Nationality	Name	From	Fee	Ref.
21 May 2024 (Note: Transfer announced on the shown date, becoming official on 1 July 2024.)	MF	(Germany)	Tunay Deniz	Hallescher FC	Undisclosed	
22 May 2024	MF	(Germany)	David Philipp	Viktoria Köln	Undisclosed	
23 May 2024	FW	(Austria)	Fabian Schubert	St. Gallen	Undisclosed	
24 May 2024	FW	(Germany)	Patrick Hobsch	SpVgg Unterhaching	Undisclosed	
26 May 2024	FW	(Germany)	Maximilian Wolfram	SC Verl	Undisclosed	
20 June 2024	DF	(Germany)	Tim Danhof	Erzgebirge Aue	Undisclosed	
25 June 2024	DF	(Austria)	Raphael Schifferl	Wolfsberger AC	Undisclosed	
3 July 2024	MF	(Germany)	Thore Jacobsen	SV Elversberg	Undisclosed	
16 July 2024	GK	(Germany)	René Vollath	SpVgg Unterhaching	Undisclosed	
3 September 2024	FW	(Japan)	Sōichirō Kōzuki	Schalke 04	Undisclosed	
20 January 2025	MF	(Germany)	Philipp Maier	SSV Ulm 1846	Undisclosed	
3 February 2025	DF	(Angola)	Anderson Lucoqui	Eintracht Braunschweig	Undisclosed	

=== Loans in ===
Start date	Position	Nationality	Name	From	End date	Ref.
20 May 2024 (Note: Transfer announced on the shown date, becoming official on 1 July 2024.)	DF	(Germany)	Florian Bähr	VfL Osnabrück	End of season	
3 February 2025	FW	(Nigeria)	Dickson Abiama	1. FC Kaiserslautern	End of season	

=== Out ===
Date	Position	Nationality	Name	To	Fee	Ref.
19 June 2024	FW	(Netherlands)	Joël Zwarts	VfL Osnabrück	Undisclosed	
24 June 2024	DF	(Austria)	Michael Glück	VfB Stuttgart II	Undisclosed	
26 June 2024	DF	(Germany)	Fabian Greilinger	Wehen Wiesbaden	Undisclosed	

=== Loans out ===
Start date	Position	Nationality	Name	To	End date	Ref.
3 February 2025	FW	(Angola)	Eliot Muteba	FV Illertissen	End of season	

=== Released ===
Date	Position	Nationality	Name	Joined	Date	Ref
17 May 2025	GK	(Germany)	Marco Hiller	KAS Eupen	11 July 2025	
17 May 2025	GK	(Kosovo)	Erion Avdija	SpVgg Unterhaching	18 June 2025	
17 May 2025	DF	(Germany)	Leroy Kwadwo	Borussia Dortmund II	14 January 2026	
17 May 2025	MF	(Germany)	Marlon Frey	1. FC Bocholt	21 October 2025	
17 May 2025	MF	(Germany)	Tim Kloss	Viktoria Köln	2 June 2025	
17 May 2025	MF	(Germany)	Moritz Bangerter	Wacker Burghausen	22 May 2025	
17 May 2025	FW	(Germany)	Raphael Ott	Viktoria Köln	21 May 2025	
30 June 2025	MF	(Germany)	Mike Gevorgyan	SpVgg Unterhaching	1 July 2025	

== Friendlies ==
=== Pre-season ===
29 June 2024 Friendly	SV Sulzemoos (Germany)	1–4	(Germany) 1860 Munich	Sulzemoos
14:00 CEST (UTC+2)	Keller 87' (pen.)	Report	Philipp 67'; Bangerter 75'; Kwadwo 83'; Leone 87'	Stadium: Freistaat-Arena; Attendance: 1,300; Referee: Fridolin Hiefner

2 July 2024 Friendly	Blau-Weiß Linz (Austria)	1–1	(Germany) 1860 Munich	Windischgarsten
18:00 CEST (UTC+2)	Seidl 64'	Report	Philipp 27'	Stadium: DANA Arena; Attendance: 400; Referee: Achim Untergasser

4 July 2024 Friendly	RC Strasbourg (France)	1–2	(Germany) 1860 Munich	Windischgarsten
18:00 CEST (UTC+2)	Ouotro 66'	Report	Hobsch 38', 83' (pen.)	Stadium: DANA Arena; Attendance: 400; Referee: Alan Kijas

13 July 2024 Friendly	1. FC Nürnberg (Germany)	1–1	(Germany) 1860 Munich	Roth
15:30 CEST (UTC+2)	Schleimer 51'	Report	Hobsch 7'	Stadium: SPECK-Sportpark; Attendance: 3,800; Referee: Tobias Wittmann

14 July 2024 Friendly	SV Schalding-Heining (Germany)	0–4	(Germany) 1860 Munich	Reutlingen
16:00 CEST (UTC+2)		Report	Hobsch 20'; Wolfram 38'; Guttau 51'; Kwadwo 90+2'	Stadium: Sportanlage; Attendance: 1,512; Referee: Michael Freund

19 July 2024 Friendly	First Vienna (Austria)	0–0	(Germany) 1860 Munich	Vienna
18:30 CEST (UTC+2)		Report		Stadium: Hohe Warte Stadium; Attendance: 3,211; Referee: Daniel Stauber

24 July 2024 Friendly	Karlsruher SC (Germany)	2–0	(Germany) 1860 Munich	Karlsruhe
14:00 CEST (UTC+2)	Heußer 25'; Geller 35'	Report		Stadium: GRENKE Stadium; Attendance: 963; Referee: Marc Heiker

27 July 2024 Friendly	1. FC Kaiserslautern (Germany)	2–0	(Germany) 1860 Munich	Kaiserslautern
13:30 CEST (UTC+2)	Ritter 57'; Mause 76'	Report		Stadium: Fritz-Walter-Stadion; Attendance: 16,139; Referee: Patrick Alt

7 January 2025 Friendly	Jahn Regensburg (Germany)	2–1	(Germany) 1860 Munich	Regensburg
13:00 CEST (UTC+2)	Hottmann 35'; Hein 75'	Report	Geipl 39' (o.g.)	Stadium: Sportpark am Kaulbachweg; Attendance: 0 Referee: Felix Grund

11 January 2025 Friendly	Greuther Fürth (Germany)	3–2	(Germany) 1860 Munich	Fürth
13:00 CEST (UTC+2)	Hrgota 43'; Popp 97', 113'	Report	Guttau 74'; Kloss 61'	Stadium: Kronacher Hard; Attendance: 0 Referee: Marcel Krauß

== Competitions ==
=== Overall record ===
Competition	First match	Last match	Starting round	Final position	Record							
Competition	First match	Last match	Starting round	Final position	Pld	W	D	L	GF	GA	GD	Win %
3. Liga	2 August 2024	17 May 2025	Matchday 1	11th	38	15	8	15	57	61	−4	39.47
Bavarian Cup	6 August 2024	16 November 2024	First Round	Quarter-finals	4	3	0	1	31	4	+27	75.00
Total					42	18	8	16	88	65	+23	42.86

Last updated: 17 May 2025
Source: Competitions

=== 3. Liga ===
==== League table ====
Pos	Team	Pld	W	D	L	GF	GA	GD	Pts
9	Wehen Wiesbaden	38	15	10	13	59	60	−1	55
10	FC Ingolstadt	38	14	12	12	72	63	+9	54
11	1860 Munich	38	15	8	15	57	61	−4	53
12	Alemannia Aachen	38	12	14	12	44	44	0	50
13	Erzgebirge Aue	38	15	5	18	52	65	−13	50

Source: DFB
Rules for classification: 1) Points; 2) Goal difference; 3) Goals scored; 4) Head-to-head results; 5) Head-to-head away goals scored; 6) Away goals scored; 7) Play-off.

==== Results summary ====
Overall								Home						Away					
Pld	W	D	L	GF	GA	GD	Pts	W	D	L	GF	GA	GD	W	D	L	GF	GA	GD
38	15	8	15	57	61	−4	53	7	4	8	28	30	−2	8	4	7	29	31	−2

Last updated: 17 May 2025.
Source: DFB

==== Results by round ====
Round	1	2	3	4	5	6	7	8	9	10	11	12	13	14	15	16	17	18	19	20	21	22	23	24	25	26	27	28	29	30	31	32	33	34	35	36	37	38
Ground	H	A	H	A	H	A	H	A	H	A	H	A	A	H	A	H	A	H	A	A	H	A	H	A	H	A	H	A	H	A	H	H	A	H	A	H	A	H
Result	L	L	L	W	L	W	W	W	L	D	D	L	W	W	D	L	W	L	L	L	D	W	D	L	L	W	W	D	W	L	W	W	W	W	L	L	D	D
Position	18	19	20	18	19	15	10	9	9	11	12	14	13	10	10	12	9	13	14	14	14	14	14	14	16	14	12	12	11	12	11	9	9	7	9	10	10	11

Updated to match(es) played on 17 May 2025. Source: DFB
A = Away; H = Home; W = Win; D = Draw; L = Loss

==== Matches ====
The match schedule was released on 9 July 2024.

2 August 2024 1	1860 Munich	0–1	1. FC Saarbrücken	Munich
19:00 CEST (UTC+2)	Jacobsen (yellow card) 23'	Report	Rizzuto (yellow card) 33'; Krahn (yellow card) 47'; Schmidt 71'	Stadium: Grünwalder Stadion; Attendance: 15,000; Referee: Konrad Oldhafer

11 August 2024 2	VfB Stuttgart II	3–1	1860 Munich	Aspach
16:30 CEST (UTC+2)	Malanga 37'; Kastanaras 53'; Nothnagel 57'; Boakye (yellow card) 85'; Simnica (yellow card) 90+1'	Report	Schubert (yellow card) 61' (goal) 83'	Stadium: WIRmachenDRUCK Arena; Attendance: 6,200; Referee: Daniel Bartnitzki

25 August 2024 3	1860 Munich	1–3	Viktoria Köln	Munich
13:30 CEST (UTC+2)	Schifferl (yellow card) 41'; Ott 68'; Reinthaler (yellow card) 81'; Bähr (yellow card) 84'	Report	Henning 26'; Cabral (yellow card) 47'; S.El Mala 49'; Güler 81' (pen.); Rauhut (yellow card) 90+5'	Stadium: Grünwalder Stadion; Attendance: 15,000; Referee: Mario Hildenbrand

31 August 2024 4	Ingolstadt 04	1–2	1860 Munich	Ingolstadt
14:00 CEST (UTC+2)	Gronning (yellow card) 30'; Funk (yellow card) 64'; Testroet 86' (pen.)	Report	Wolfram 5'; Frey (yellow card) 34'; Philipp (yellow card) 37'; Guttau 64'	Stadium: Audi Sportpark; Attendance: 12,965; Referee: Felix Bickel

14 September 2024 5	1860 Munich	2–3	Dynamo Dresden	Munich
14:00 CEST (UTC+2)	Deniz (yellow card) 24' (goal) 40'; Schifferl (yellow card) 61'; Guttau 71' (yellow card) 78'	Report	Daferner (yellow card) 25'; Menzel 30', 68'; Casar (yellow card) 33'; Meißner 51'	Stadium: Grünwalder Stadion; Attendance: 15,000; Referee: Nicolas Winter

21 September 2024 6	Arminia Bielefeld	0–1	1860 Munich	Bielefeld
16:30 CEST (UTC+2)	Corboz (yellow card) 90+5'	Report	Philipp (yellow card) 67'; Jacobsen 88'	Stadium: SchücoArena; Attendance: 24,865; Referee: Nico Fuchs

25 September 2024 7	1860 Munich	1–0	Hannover 96 II	Munich
19:00 CEST (UTC+2)	Hobsch 41'; Deniz (yellow card) 48'; Hobsch (yellow card) 56'; Schifferl (red card) 71'; Wolfram (yellow card) 82'	Report	Brandt (yellow card) 3'; Kalem (yellow card) 31'; Matsuda (yellow card) 35' (yellow-red card) 90+1'; Dammeier (yellow card) 44'	Stadium: Grünwalder Stadion; Attendance: 15,000; Referee: Martin Wilke

28 September 2024 8	Borussia Dortmund II	1–2	1860 Munich	Dortmund
14:00 CEST (UTC+2)	Azhil 34'	Report	Wolfram 55'; Deniz 61' (yellow card) 61'; Kōzuki (yellow card) 80'	Stadium: Stadion Rote Erde; Attendance: 5,010; Referee: Kevin Behrens

5 October 2024 9	1860 Munich	2–3	Wehen Wiesbaden	Munich
14:00 CEST (UTC+2)	Jacobsen (yellow card) 8'; Kōzuki (yellow card) 30'; Deniz (yellow card) 41'; Guttau 45'; Hobsch 72'	Report	Greilinger (yellow card) 35'; Flotho 37'; Bätzner 42'; Carstens 54'; Kiomourtzoglou (yellow card) 63'; Johansson (yellow card) 79'; Carstens (yellow card) 79'	Stadium: Grünwalder Stadion; Attendance: 15,000; Referee: Marc Philip Eckermann

20 October 2024 10	SpVgg Unterhaching	2–2	1860 Munich	Unterhaching
19:30 CEST (UTC+2)	Kügel (yellow card) 20'; Skarlatidis 49' (pen.); Verlaat 58' (o.g.); Schwabl (yellow card) 88'	Report	Hobsch (yellow card) 21' (goal) 33'; Deniz (yellow card) 34'; Vollath (yellow card) 48'; Kōzuki 54'; Jacobsen (yellow card) 60'	Stadium: Uhlsport Park; Attendance: 14,250; Referee: Cristian Ballweg

23 October 2024 11	1860 Munich	2–2	VfL Osnabrück	Munich
18:30 CEST (UTC+2)	Jacobsen (yellow card) 31'; Hobsch 41'; Wolfram 76' (yellow card) 90+2'	Report	Zwarts 43'; Simakala 79' (pen.); Semić (yellow card) 80'	Stadium: Grünwalder Stadion; Attendance: 15,000; Referee: Konrad Oldhafer

27 October 2024 12	Energie Cottbus	5–1	1860 Munich	Cottbus
13:30 CET (UTC+1)	Möker 3'; Copado 21', 30'; Pelivan (yellow card) 35'; Campulka (yellow card) 35'; Ciğerci 45+1'; Thiele 61'	Report	Schröter 26'; Reich (yellow card) 86'	Stadium: LEAG Energie Stadion; Attendance: 14,779; Referee: Daniel Bartnitzki

2 November 2024 13	SV Sandhausen	0–3	1860 Munich	Sandhausen
14:00 CET (UTC+1)	Stolze (yellow card) 2'; Wolf (yellow card) 22'; Lewald (yellow card) 87'	Report	Reinthaler 10'; Bähr (yellow card) 31'; Kōzuki 33'; Wolfram (yellow card) 78'; Schröter (yellow card) 88'; Philipp 90+3'	Stadium: GP Stadion am Hardtwald; Attendance: 5,280; Referee: Fabienne Michel

9 November 2024 14	1860 Munich	3–0	Waldhof Mannheim	Munich
14:00 CET (UTC+1)	Guttau 51'; Deniz 66' (yellow card) 81'; Wolfram 83'	Report	Klünter (yellow card) 32'; Sietan (yellow card) 70'	Stadium: Grünwalder Stadion; Attendance: 15,000; Referee: Nico Fuchs

23 November 2024 15	Alemannia Aachen	1–1	1860 Munich	Aachen
14:00 CET (UTC+1)	Baxter Bahn 11' (pen.); Hanraths (yellow card) 55'; Johnen (yellow card) 56'; Heister (yellow card) 63'; Yarbrough (yellow card) 81'	Report	Deniz (yellow card) 45+1'; Schröter (yellow card) 61'; Jacobsen (yellow card) 65'; Schifferl (yellow card) 86'; Hobsch 87' (yellow card) 89'; Wolfram (yellow card) 89'; Schubert (yellow card) 90+3'	Stadium: New Tivoli; Attendance: 31,579; Referee: Martin Wilke

30 November 2024 16	1860 Munich	1–2	Hansa Rostock	Munich
14:00 CET (UTC+1)	Frey 6'; Bähr (yellow card) 14'; Wolfram (yellow card) 48'; Reinthaler (yellow card) 60'	Report	Haugen (yellow card) 24' (goal) 81' (pen.); Neidhart (yellow card) 29'; Gürleyen (yellow card) 39'; Kinsombi (yellow card) 51'; Rossipal 52'; Jonjić (yellow card) 90+2'	Stadium: Grünwalder Stadion; Attendance: 15,000; Referee: Yannick Rupert

8 December 2024 17	Rot-Weiss Essen	0–3	1860 Munich	Essen
13:30 CET (UTC+1)	Alonso (yellow card) 40'; Kraulich (red card) 60'; Vonić (yellow card) 74'	Report	Jacobsen 38' (pen.); Guttau 49'; Deniz (yellow card) 55'; Hobsch (yellow card) 69'; Schubert 82'	Stadium: Stadion an der Hafenstraße; Attendance: 16,627; Referee: Martin Speckner

14 December 2024 18	1860 Munich	0–4	SC Verl	Munich
16:30 CET (UTC+1)	Dulic (yellow card) 9'; Kōzuki (red card) 31'; Schröter (yellow card) 44'; Deniz (yellow card) 70'	Report	Steczyk 43'; Otto (yellow card) 63'; Lokotsch 76'; Stark 77'; Kwadwo 85' (o.g.)	Stadium: Grünwalder Stadion; Attendance: 15,000; Referee: Felix Bickel

21 December 2024 19	Erzgebirge Aue	3–1	1860 Munich	Aue
14:00 CET (UTC+1)	Jakob 7'; Fabisch (yellow card) 76'; Bär 88', 90'	Report	Deniz (yellow card) 12'; Bähr (yellow card) 35'; Wolfram (yellow card) 35' (goal) 40'; Kwadwo (yellow card) 87'; Jacobsen (yellow card) 90+2'	Stadium: Erzgebirgsstadion; Attendance: 12,914; Referee: Marc Philip Eckermann

18 January 2025 20	1. FC Saarbrücken	4–0	1860 Munich	Saarbrücken
14:00 CET (UTC+1)	Rabihić (yellow card) 10'; Vasiliadis 28'; Sonnenberg (yellow card) 43'; Civeja 45'; Fahrner (yellow card) 47'; Rabihić 54'; Multhaup 75'	Report	Wolfram (yellow card) 12'; Reinthaler (yellow card) 28'	Stadium: Ludwigsparkstadion; Attendance: 13,197; Referee: Luca Jürgensen

25 January 2025 21	1860 Munich	1–1	VfB Stuttgart II	Munich
14:00 CET (UTC+1)	Dulic (yellow card) 35'; Maier (yellow card) 45'; Jacobsen 68'; Reinthaler (yellow card) 79'; Jacobsen (yellow card) 83'	Report	Amaniampong (yellow card) 40'; Ulrich 57'; Boakye (yellow card) 90+4'	Stadium: Grünwalder Stadion; Attendance: 15,000; Referee: Jarno Wienefeld

1 February 2025 22	Viktoria Köln	1–2	1860 Munich	Cologne
16:30 CET (UTC+1)	S.El Mala 28'; Pöpperl (yellow card) 39'; Cabral (yellow card) 45+1'; Dietz (yellow card) 75'; M.El Mala (yellow card) 85' (yellow-red card) 87'	Report	Kwadwo (yellow card) 45'; Philipp (yellow card) 69'; Hobsch 73'; Wolfram 76'; Maier (yellow card) 89'; Danhof (yellow card) 90+1'	Stadium: Sportpark Höhenberg; Attendance: 5,849; Referee: Felix Wagner

8 February 2025 23	1860 Munich	1–1	Ingolstadt 04	Munich
16:30 CET (UTC+1)	Maier (yellow card) 3'; Wolfram (yellow card) 42'; Wolfram 64'	Report	Besuschkow (yellow card) 17'; Grønning 69'; Fröde (yellow card) 89'	Stadium: Grünwalder Stadion; Attendance: 15,000; Referee: Patrick Schwengers

16 February 2025 24	Dynamo Dresden	5–2	1860 Munich	Dresden
19:30 CET (UTC+1)	Daferner 6', 32'; Hoti 39'; Menzel 63'; Lemmer 70'; Casar (yellow card) 83'	Report	Kwadwo 9' (yellow card) 43'; Danhof (yellow card) 22'; Jacobsen (yellow card) 24'; Lucoqui (yellow card) 75'; Wolfram 90+2' (pen.)	Stadium: Rudolf-Harbig-Stadion; Attendance: 29,004; Referee: Nicolas Winter

21 February 2025 25	1860 Munich	0–3	Arminia Bielefeld	Munich
18:30 CET (UTC+1)	Verlaat (yellow card) 59'; Lucoqui (yellow card) 71'	Report	Grodowski (yellow card) 31' (goal) 36'; Lannert (yellow card) 33'; Felix (yellow card) 40'; Kunze (yellow card) 75'; Uldriķis 83' (yellow card) 84'; Kania 90+3'	Stadium: Grünwalder Stadion; Attendance: 15,000; Referee: Marc Philip Eckermann

1 March 2025 26	Hannover 96 II	1–3	1860 Munich	Hannover
14:00 CET (UTC+1)	Sulejmani 27'; Westermeier (yellow card) 43'; Wallner (yellow card) 56'; Uhlmann (yellow card) 74'; Videira (yellow card) 90+1'	Report	Maier (yellow card) 25'; Kōzuki (yellow card) 33'; Deniz 66'; Philipp (yellow card) 69'; Guttau 70'; Hobsch 76'; Vollath (yellow card) 76'	Stadium: Eilenriedestadion; Attendance: 2,925; Referee: Felix Weller

9 March 2025 27	1860 Munich	1–0	Borussia Dortmund II	Munich
13:30 CET (UTC+1)	Danhof 8'; Vollath (yellow card) 42'; Lucoqui (yellow card) 51'	Report	Eberwein (yellow card) 32'; Roggow (yellow card) 72'; Paulina (yellow card) 90+6'	Stadium: Grünwalder Stadion; Attendance: 15,000; Referee: Daniel Bartnitzki

12 March 2025 28	Wehen Wiesbaden	0–0	1860 Munich	Wiesbaden
19:00 CET (UTC+1)	Carstens (yellow card) 60'	Report	Deniz (yellow card) 12'; Dulic (yellow card) 49'	Stadium: Brita Arena; Attendance: 3,816; Referee: Justin Hasmann

15 March 2025 29	1860 Munich	2–1	SpVgg Unterhaching	Munich
16:30 CET (UTC+1)	Hobsch (yellow card) 3'; Kwadwo (yellow card) 37'; Reich 44'; Deniz 59'; Danhof (yellow card) 65'; Wolfram (red card) 73'	Report	Jastremski 8'; Popp (yellow card) 36'; Knipping (yellow card) 57'; Eisele (yellow card) 73'; Stiefler (yellow card) 86'	Stadium: Grünwalder Stadion; Attendance: 15,000; Referee: Assad Nouhoum

29 March 2025 30	VfL Osnabrück	1–0	1860 Munich	Osnabrück
14:00 CET (UTC+1)	Simakala 6'; Henning (yellow card) 30'	Report	Lucoqui (yellow card) 61'; Vollath (yellow card) 89'	Stadium: Stadion an der Bremer Brücke; Attendance: 15,741; Referee: Florian Lechner

5 April 2025 31	1860 Munich	5–1	Energie Cottbus	Munich
14:00 CEST (UTC+2)	Abiama 15'; Deniz 18'; Hobsch 37', 50'; Putze 89' (o.g.)	Report	Hasse (yellow card) 66'; Thiele 71'	Stadium: Grünwalder Stadion; Attendance: 15,000; Referee: Felix Bickel

9 April 2025 32	1860 Munich	2–0	SV Sandhausen	Munich
19:00 CEST (UTC+2)	Hobsch 1' (yellow card) 35'; Guttau 12'	Report	Simnica (yellow card) 69'; Schikora (yellow card) 89'	Stadium: Grünwalder Stadion; Attendance: 15,000; Referee: Tom Bauer

13 April 2025 33	Waldhof Mannheim	0–3	1860 Munich	Mannheim
13:30 CEST (UTC+2)	Thalhammer (yellow card) 45+1'; Boyd (yellow card) 73'	Report	Abiama (yellow card) 31'; Verlaat (yellow card) 35'; Jacobsen 43' (pen.) (yellow card) 79'; Kōzuki (yellow card) 45'; Lucoqui (yellow card) 59'; Hobsch 61'; Philipp 83'	Stadium: Carl-Benz-Stadion; Attendance: 15,779; Referee: Dr. Max Burda

19 April 2025 34	1860 Munich	2–1	Alemannia Aachen	Munich
14:00 CEST (UTC+2)	Abiama 39' (yellow card) 90+2'; Hobsch (yellow card) 52'; Philipp 89' (yellow card) 90+4'	Report	Bakhat 49'	Stadium: Grünwalder Stadion; Attendance: 15,000; Referee: Leonidas Exuzidis

25 April 2025 35	Hansa Rostock	1–0	1860 Munich	Rostock
19:00 CEST (UTC+2)	Dietze (yellow card) 45+2'; Ruschke 48'; Haugen (yellow card) 72'; Gürleyen (yellow card) 88'	Report	Jacobsen (yellow card) 36' (yellow-red card) 89'; Lucoqui (yellow card) 72'; Abiama (yellow card) 77'	Stadium: Ostseestadion; Attendance: 26,567; Referee: Patrick Alt

3 May 2025 36	1860 Munich	1–3	Rot-Weiss Essen	Munich
14:00 CEST (UTC+2)	Lucoqui (yellow card) 36'; Maier (yellow card) 40'; Verlaat 78'	Report	Brumme (yellow card) 54'; Müsel 65'; Mizuta 69'; Safi 82'	Stadium: Grünwalder Stadion; Attendance: 15,000; Referee: Kevin Behrens

10 May 2025 37	SC Verl	2–2	1860 Munich	Verl
14:00 CEST (UTC+2)	Mikic (yellow card) 16'; Otto 48'; Steczyk (yellow card) 64'; Lokotsch 77'	Report	Guttau 14'; Deniz (yellow card) 44'; Philipp (yellow card) 59'; Verlaat (yellow card) 64'; Abiama (yellow card) 64'; Dulic (yellow card) 72'; Kōzuki 90+3'	Stadium: Sportclub Arena; Attendance: 3,630; Referee: Michael Näther

17 May 2025 38	1860 Munich	1–1	Erzgebirge Aue	Munich
13:30 CEST (UTC+2)	Deniz (yellow card) 42'; Jacobsen 52' (pen.); Kōzuki (yellow card) 68'	Report	Seitz 2'; Sijarić (yellow card) 11'; Jakob (yellow card) 51'	Stadium: Grünwalder Stadion; Attendance: 15,000; Referee: Martin Speckner

=== Bavarian Cup ===
6 August 2024 First Round	SSV Kasendorf	0–18	1860 Munich	Kasendorf
18:30 CEST (UTC+2)	Eschenbacher (yellow card) 58'	Report	Deniz 4', 51'; Schröter 6'; Schubert 12', 52', 59'; Bangerter 14'; Reinthaler 19'; Ott 32', 36', 40', 42'; Muteba 44', 47', 53'; Frey 49'; Hobsch 64', 87'	Stadium: Sportanlage Kasendorf; Attendance: 1,500; Referee: Maximilian Dadder

15 August 2024 Second Round	FC Thalhofen	0–10	1860 Munich	Thalhofen an der Gennach
17:00 CEST (UTC+2)		Report	Ott 11', 41', 77'; Reinthaler 16', 44'; Deniz 21'; Schubert 58'; Hobsch 63', 73'; Wolfram 90'	Stadium: Stadion am Mühlsteig; Attendance: 2,300; Referee: Gürkan Günebakan

3 September 2024 Third Round	FC Memmingen	1–2	1860 Munich	Memmingen
19:00 CEST (UTC+2)	Kroh (yellow card) 72'; Gräser 82'; Rietzler (yellow card) 90+7'	Report	Hobsch 41'; Frey (yellow card) 69'; Schubert 90+3'; Vollath (yellow card) 90+4'; Schubert (yellow card) 90+6' (yellow-red card) 90+8'	Stadium: Memminger Arena; Attendance: 2,509; Referee: Stefan Treiber

16 November 2024 Quarter-finals	1860 Munich	1–3	SpVgg Unterhaching	Munich
17:00 CEST (UTC+2)	Deniz (yellow card) 35'; Bähr (yellow card) 50'; Vollath (yellow card) 54'; Verlaat 90+3'	Report	Geis 31'; Adu (yellow card) 35'; Kügel 61'; Leuthard (yellow card) 62'; Lamby (yellow card) 64' (goal) 78'	Stadium: Grünwalder Stadion; Attendance: 12,470; Referee: Simon Schreiner

== Squad statistics ==
=== Appearances and goals ===
As of match played 17 May 2025

Players with no appearances are not included on the list
Italics indicate a loaned in player

No.	Pos	Nat	Player	Total		3. Liga		Bavarian Cup	
No.	Pos	Nat	Player	Apps	Goals	Apps	Goals	Apps	Goals
1	GK	(Germany) GER	Marco Hiller	30	0	26	0	4	0
2	DF	(Germany) GER	Tim Danhof	23	1	18+4	1	0+1	0
3	DF	(Angola) ANG	Anderson Lucoqui	12	0	10+2	0	0	0
4	DF	(Netherlands) NED	Jesper Verlaat	33	2	30	1	3	1
5	MF	(Germany) GER	Thore Jacobsen	37	5	32+3	5	1+1	0
7	FW	(Germany) GER	Julian Guttau	41	8	31+6	8	3+1	0
8	MF	(Germany) GER	David Philipp	34	3	9+23	3	0+2	0
9	FW	(Nigeria) NGA	Dickson Abiama	16	2	16	2	0	0
10	FW	(Austria) AUT	Fabian Schubert	27	7	6+18	2	2+1	5
11	GK	(Germany) GER	René Vollath	12	0	12	0	0	0
14	FW	(Japan) JPN	Sōichirō Kōzuki	33	3	20+12	3	1	0
16	DF	(Italy) ITA	Max Reinthaler	23	4	15+4	1	4	3
17	MF	(Germany) GER	Morris Schröter	19	1	15+2	1	2	0
18	MF	(Germany) GER	Tim Kloss	20	0	4+14	0	1+1	0
20	DF	(Germany) GER	Lukas Reich	35	1	20+11	1	4	0
21	DF	(Germany) GER	Leroy Kwadwo	24	1	19+5	1	0	0
22	MF	(Armenia) ARM	Mike Gevorgyan	2	0	0+2	0	0	0
24	DF	(Austria) AUT	Raphael Schifferl	19	0	12+4	0	1+2	0
25	DF	(Germany) GER	Sean Dulic	22	0	18+2	0	0+2	0
26	MF	(Germany) GER	Philipp Maier	13	0	9+4	0	0	0
27	FW	(Germany) GER	Raphael Ott	18	8	1+13	1	3+1	7
28	DF	(Germany) GER	Florian Bähr	20	0	11+5	0	4	0
30	FW	(Germany) GER	Maximilian Wolfram	38	9	21+14	8	0+3	1
32	MF	(Germany) GER	Moritz Bangerter	1	1	0	0	1	1
34	FW	(Germany) GER	Patrick Hobsch	40	16	26+10	11	3+1	5
36	MF	(Germany) GER	Tunay Deniz	39	9	31+4	6	4	3
37	MF	(Germany) GER	Marlon Frey	22	1	6+13	1	3	0
49	MF	(Turkey) TUR	Emre Erdogan	1	0	0+1	0	0	0
Players away on loan:
39	FW	(Angola) ANG	Eliot Muteba	6	3	0+4	0	0+2	3
Players who featured but departed the club permanently during the season:

=== Goal scorers ===
As of match played 17 May 2025

Place	Position	Nation	Number	Name	3. Liga	Bavarian Cup	Total
1	FW	(Germany)	34	Patrick Hobsch	11	5	16
2	FW	(Germany)	30	Maximilian Wolfram	8	1	9
2	MF	(Germany)	36	Tunay Deniz	6	3	9
4	MF	(Germany)	7	Julian Guttau	8	0	8
4	FW	(Germany)	27	Raphael Ott	1	7	8
6	FW	(Austria)	10	Fabian Schubert	2	5	7
7	MF	(Germany)	5	Thore Jacobsen	5	0	5
8	DF	(Italy)	16	Max Reinthaler	1	3	4
9	MF	(Germany)	8	David Philipp	3	0	3
9	FW	(Japan)	14	Sōichirō Kōzuki	3	0	3
9	FW	(Angola)	39	Eliot Muteba	0	3	3
12	FW	(Nigeria)	9	Dickson Abiama	2	0	2
12	MF	(Germany)	17	Morris Schröter	1	1	2
12	MF	(Germany)	37	Marlon Frey	1	1	2
12	DF	(Netherlands)	4	Jesper Verlaat	1	1	2
16	DF	(Germany)	21	Leroy Kwadwo	1	0	1
16	DF	(Germany)	2	Tim Danhof	1	0	1
16	DF	(Germany)	20	Lukas Reich	1	0	1
16	MF	(Germany)	32	Moritz Bangerter	0	1	1
16				Own goal	1	0	1
Total					57	31	88

=== Clean sheets ===
As of match played 17 May 2025

Place	Position	Nation	Number	Name	3. Liga	Bavarian Cup	Total
1	GK	(Germany)	1	Marco Hiller	7	2	9
2	GK	(Germany)	11	René Vollath	2	0	2
Total					9	2	11

=== Disciplinary record ===
As of match played 17 May 2025

Number	Nation	Position	Name	3. Liga		Bavarian Cup		Total	
Number	Nation	Position	Name	Booked	Sent off (straight red)	Booked	Sent off (straight red)	Booked	Sent off (straight red)
2	(Germany)	DF	Tim Danhof	3	0	0	0	3	0
3	(Angola)	DF	Anderson Lucoqui	7	0	0	0	7	0
4	(Netherlands)	DF	Jesper Verlaat	3	0	0	0	3	0
5	(Germany)	MF	Thore Jacobsen	11	1	0	0	11	1
7	(Germany)	MF	Julian Guttau	1	0	0	0	1	0
8	(Germany)	MF	David Philipp	6	0	0	0	6	0
9	(Nigeria)	FW	Dickson Abiama	4	0	0	0	4	0
10	(Austria)	FW	Fabian Schubert	2	0	2	1	4	1
11	(Germany)	GK	René Vollath	4	0	2	0	6	0
14	(Japan)	FW	Sōichirō Kōzuki	5	1	0	0	5	1
16	(Italy)	DF	Max Reinthaler	4	0	0	0	4	0
17	(Germany)	MF	Morris Schröter	3	0	0	0	3	0
20	(Germany)	DF	Lukas Reich	1	0	0	0	1	0
21	(Germany)	DF	Leroy Kwadwo	4	0	0	0	4	0
24	(Austria)	DF	Raphael Schifferl	3	1	0	0	3	1
25	(Germany)	DF	Sean Dulic	4	0	0	0	4	0
26	(Germany)	MF	Philipp Maier	5	0	0	0	5	0
28	(Germany)	DF	Florian Bähr	4	0	1	0	5	0
30	(Germany)	FW	Maximilian Wolfram	8	1	0	0	8	1
34	(Germany)	FW	Patrick Hobsch	7	0	0	0	7	0
36	(Germany)	MF	Tunay Deniz	13	0	1	0	14	0
37	(Germany)	MF	Marlon Frey	1	0	1	0	2	0
Players away on loan:
Players who left 1860 Munich during the season:
Total				103	4	7	1	110	5
