= 2023–24 SpVgg Unterhaching season =

SpVgg Unterhaching
2023–24 season
- Chairman: Manfred Schwabl
- Head coach: Marc Unterberger
- Stadium: Sportpark Unterhaching
- 3. Liga: 9th
- DFB-Pokal: Second round
- Bavarian Cup: Round of 16
- Top goalscorer: League: Patrick Hobsch (13); All: Patrick Hobsch (15)

The 2023–24 season was SpVgg Unterhaching's 99th season in existence and first one back in the 3. Liga. They also competed in the DFB-Pokal and the Bavarian Cup.

== Players ==
=== First-team squad ===
As of 19 February 2024

Note: Flags indicate national team as defined under FIFA eligibility rules; some limited exceptions apply. Players may hold more than one non-FIFA nationality.

| No. | Pos. | Nation | Player |
|---|---|---|---|
| 1 | GK | GER | René Vollath |
| 2 | DF | CZE | Viktor Zentrich |
| 3 | DF | GER | Max Lamby |
| 4 | MF | GER | Yannick Stark |
| 5 | DF | GER | Josef Welzmüller (captain) |
| 6 | MF | GER | Ben Westermeier |
| 7 | MF | GER | Maurice Krattenmacher |
| 8 | MF | GER | Manuel Stiefler |
| 10 | MF | GER | Sebastian Maier |
| 11 | FW | GER | Mathias Fetsch |
| 15 | DF | GER | Timon Obermeier |
| 16 | MF | SUI | Aaron Keller |
| 19 | MF | GER | Maximilian Welzmüller |
| 21 | MF | GER | Tizian Zimmermann |
| 22 | GK | GER | Fabian Scherger |
| 23 | DF | GER | Markus Schwabl |

| No. | Pos. | Nation | Player |
|---|---|---|---|
| 24 | GK | GER | Konstantin Heide |
| 26 | DF | GER | Benedikt Bauer |
| 30 | MF | GER | Simon Skarlatidis |
| 31 | FW | GER | Florian Schmid |
| 33 | FW | GER | Simon Dorfner |
| 34 | FW | GER | Patrick Hobsch |
| 35 | MF | GER | Josef Gottmeier |
| 36 | DF | KOS | Elion Haxhosaj |
| 37 | DF | AUT | Raphael Schifferl (on loan from Wolfsberger AC) |
| 38 | MF | RSA | Boipelo Mashigo |
| 39 | DF | GER | Dennis Waidner |
| 40 | MF | GER | Leonard Grob |
| 44 | FW | GER | Andreas Hirtlreiter |
| 45 | GK | GER | Hannes Heilmair |
| 49 | GK | GER | Kai Fritz |

== Transfers ==
=== In ===
| Pos. | Player | Transferred from | Fee | Date | Source |

=== Out ===
| Pos. | Player | Transferred to | Fee | Date | Source |
|---|---|---|---|---|---|
| DF | (Germany) Christoph Ehlich | (Germany) SV Sandhausen | Free | 1 July 2023 | |
| MF | (Germany) Niclas Anspach | (Germany) Jahn Regensburg | Free | 1 July 2023 | |

== Pre-season and friendlies ==
| 14 July 2023 Friendly | Ried (Austria) | 1–2 | (Germany) SpVgg Unterhaching |
| 18:00 |

== Competitions ==
=== Overall record ===
| Competition | First match | Last match | Starting round | Final position | Record | | | | | | | |
| Competition | First match | Last match | Starting round | Final position | Pld | W | D | L | GF | GA | GD | Win % |
|---|---|---|---|---|---|---|---|---|---|---|---|---|
| 3. Liga | 5 August 2023 | 18 May 2024 | Matchday 1 | 9th | 38 | 16 | 7 | 15 | 50 | 49 | +1 | 42.11 |
| DFB-Pokal | 13 August 2023 | 31 October 2023 | First round | Second round | 2 | 1 | 0 | 1 | 5 | 6 | −1 | 50.00 |
| Bavarian Cup | 1 August 2023 | 5 September 2023 | First round | Round of 16 | 3 | 2 | 0 | 1 | 11 | 5 | +6 | 66.67 |
| Total | | | | | 43 | 19 | 7 | 17 | 66 | 60 | +6 | 44.19 |

Source: Soccerway

=== 3. Liga ===
==== League table ====
| Pos | Team | Pld | W | D | L | GF | GA | GD | Pts |
|---|---|---|---|---|---|---|---|---|---|
| 7 | Rot-Weiss Essen | 38 | 17 | 8 | 13 | 60 | 53 | +7 | 59 |
| 8 | SV Sandhausen | 38 | 15 | 11 | 12 | 58 | 57 | +1 | 56 |
| 9 | SpVgg Unterhaching | 38 | 16 | 7 | 15 | 50 | 49 | +1 | 55 |
| 10 | FC Ingolstadt | 38 | 14 | 12 | 12 | 65 | 51 | +14 | 54 |
| 11 | Borussia Dortmund II (Note: Reserve teams are ineligible for promotion or DFB-Pokal qualification.) | 38 | 14 | 12 | 12 | 58 | 53 | +5 | 54 |

Source: DFB
Rules for classification: 1) Points; 2) Goal difference; 3) Goals scored; 4) Head-to-head results; 5) Head-to-head away goals scored; 6) Away goals scored; 7) Play-off.

==== Results summary ====
| Overall | | | | | | | | Home | | | | | | Away | | | | | |
| Pld | W | D | L | GF | GA | GD | Pts | W | D | L | GF | GA | GD | W | D | L | GF | GA | GD |
|---|---|---|---|---|---|---|---|---|---|---|---|---|---|---|---|---|---|---|---|
| 38 | 16 | 7 | 15 | 50 | 49 | +1 | 55 | 11 | 3 | 5 | 32 | 19 | +13 | 5 | 4 | 10 | 18 | 30 | −12 |

Source: 3. Liga

==== Results by round ====
| Round | 1 | 2 | 3 | 4 | 5 | 6 | 7 | 8 | 9 | 10 | 11 | 12 | 13 | 14 | 15 | 16 | 17 | 18 | 19 | 20 | 21 | 22 | 23 | 24 | 25 | 26 | 27 | 28 | 29 | 30 | 31 | 32 | 33 | 34 | 35 | 36 | 37 | 38 |
|---|---|---|---|---|---|---|---|---|---|---|---|---|---|---|---|---|---|---|---|---|---|---|---|---|---|---|---|---|---|---|---|---|---|---|---|---|---|---|
| Ground | A | H | A | H | A | H | H | A | H | A | H | A | H | A | H | A | H | A | H | H | A | H | A | H | A | A | H | A | H | A | H | A | H | A | H | A | H | A |
| Result | D | W | D | W | D | D | L | D | W | L | D | L | W | W | D | W | W | L | W | L | L | W | L | W | L | W | L | W | W | L | L | L | W | L | W | W | L | L |
| Position | 6 | 3 | 5 | 2 | 3 | 4 | 8 | 11 | 7 | 9 | 9 | 14 | 11 | 6 | 6 | 6 | 5 | 11 | 8 | 6 | 10 | 7 | 11 | 7 | 11 | 10 | 11 | 8 | 6 | 8 | 8 | 9 | 8 | 11 | 8 | 7 | 8 | 9 |

Source: 3. Liga
A = Away; H = Home; W = Win; D = Draw; L = Loss

==== Matches ====
The league fixtures were unveiled on 7 July 2023.

| 5 August 2023 1 | Jahn Regensburg | 1–1 | SpVgg Unterhaching | Regensburg |
| 14:00 UTC+2 | Viet 20' | Report | Keller 24' | Stadium: Jahnstadion Regensburg; Attendance: 11,081; Referee: Florian Exner |

| 19 August 2023 2 | SpVgg Unterhaching | 3–2 | SSV Ulm 1846 | Unterhaching |
| 14:00 UTC+2 | Fetsch 40'; Hobsch 79', 90+6' | Report | Schiffert 11' (o.g.); Reichert 45+5' (pen.) | Stadium: Sportpark Unterhaching; Attendance: 8,000; Referee: Robin Braun |

| 23 August 2023 3 | SC Freiburg II | 0–0 | SpVgg Unterhaching | Freiburg |
| 19:00 UTC+2 | | Report | | Stadium: Dreisamstadion; Attendance: 2,180; Referee: Timon Schulz |

| 26 August 2023 4 | SpVgg Unterhaching | 2–1 | Viktoria Köln | Unterhaching |
| 14:00 UTC+2 | Skarlatidis 15'; Fritz 53' (o.g.) | Report | Handle 80' | Stadium: Sportpark Unterhaching; Attendance: 3,500; Referee: Patrick Kessel |

| 2 September 2023 5 | SC Verl | 0–0 | SpVgg Unterhaching | Verl |
| 14:00 UTC+2 | | Report | | Stadium: Sportclub Arena; Attendance: 1,505; Referee: Fabienne Michel |

| 17 September 2023 6 | SpVgg Unterhaching | 0–0 | 1. FC Saarbrücken | Unterhaching |
| 14:00 UTC+2 | | Report | | Stadium: Sportpark Unterhaching; Attendance: 4,250; Referee: Felix Bickel |

| 22 September 2023 7 | SpVgg Unterhaching | 1–2 | Arminia Bielefeld | Unterhaching |
| 19:00 UTC+2 | Stiefler 67' | Report | Mizuta 28'; Putaro 89' | Stadium: Sportpark Unterhaching; Attendance: 3,500; Referee: Tom Bauer |

| 1 October 2023 8 | Borussia Dortmund II | 2–2 | SpVgg Unterhaching | Dortmund |
| 16:30 UTC+2 | Hettwer 5'; Besong 33' | Report | Fetsch 36'; Hobsch 87' | Stadium: Stadion Rote Erde; Attendance: 2,802; Referee: Nico Fuchs |

| 4 October 2023 9 | SpVgg Unterhaching | 4–0 | Rot-Weiss Essen | Unterhaching |
| 19:00 UTC+2 | Fetsch 28', 45+1', 57', 89' | Report | | Stadium: Sportpark Unterhaching; Attendance: 3,600; Referee: Felix Prigan |

| 7 October 2023 10 | MSV Duisburg | 1–0 | SpVgg Unterhaching | Duisburg |
| 14:00 UTC+2 | Jander 69' | Report | | Stadium: Schauinsland-Reisen-Arena; Attendance: 9,513; Referee: Martin Speckner |

| 14 October 2023 11 | SpVgg Unterhaching | 0–0 | SV Sandhausen | Unterhaching |
| 14:00 UTC+2 | | Report | | Stadium: Sportpark Unterhaching; Attendance: 3,600; Referee: Felix Weller |

| 21 October 2023 12 | FC Ingolstadt | 3–0 | SpVgg Unterhaching | Ingolstadt |
| 14:00 UTC+2 | Kanuric 71'; Lorenz 85'; Fröde 89' | Report | | Stadium: Audi-Sportpark; Attendance: 5,713; Referee: Lars Erbst |

| 27 October 2023 13 | SpVgg Unterhaching | 3–0 | Waldhof Mannheim | Unterhaching |
| 19:00 UTC+2 | Hobsch 3' (pen.), 59'; Stiefler 74' | Report | | Stadium: Sportpark Unterhaching; Attendance: 3,600; Referee: Wolfgang Haslberger |

| 4 November 2023 14 | VfB Lübeck | 2–3 | SpVgg Unterhaching | Lübeck |
| 14:00 UTC+1 | Akono 53'; Breier 77' | Report | Maier 2'; Hobsch 4', 38' | Stadium: Stadion an der Lohmühle; Attendance: 4,381; Referee: Fabienne Michel |

| 11 November 2023 15 | SpVgg Unterhaching | 0–0 | Erzgebirge Aue | Unterhaching |
| 14:00 UTC+1 | | Report | | Stadium: Sportpark Unterhaching; Attendance: 5,000; Referee: Lukas Benen |

=== DFB-Pokal ===
| 13 August 2023 First round | SpVgg Unterhaching | 2–0 | FC Augsburg | Unterhaching |
| 15:30 UTC+2 | Fetsch 29'; Mashigo 90+4' | Report | | Stadium: Sportpark Unterhaching; Referee: Timo Gerach |

| 31 October 2023 Second round | SpVgg Unterhaching | 3–6 (a.e.t.) | Fortuna Düsseldorf | Unterhaching |
| 20:45 UTC+2 | Hobsch 34', 55' (pen.); Skarlatidis 71' | Report | Klaus 65'; Jóhannesson 66', 78', 107'; Tzolis 115'; Jastrzembski 117' | Stadium: Sportpark Unterhaching; Attendance: 10,000; Referee: Alexander Sather |

=== Bavarian Cup ===
| 1 August 2023 First round | SpVgg Willmering-Waffenbrunn | 1–7 | SpVgg Unterhaching | Willmering |
| 18:30 UTC+2 | Wagner 88' | | Markert 19'; Girtler 34' (pen.), 38'; Ortel 36'; Hirtlreiter 48'; Schmid 54'; Lautenbacher 84' | Stadium: Sportgelände Willmering Platz 1 Attendance: 507; Referee: Leonhard Burghartwieser |

| 15 August 2023 Second round | FC Schwabing | 1–4 | SpVgg Unterhaching | Schwabing |
| 17:00 UTC+2 | Kapusta 80' | | Mashigo 4'; Fröhlich 6'; Schmid 34'; Girtler 42' | Stadium: Sportanlage Alte Haide/Schwabing Platz 1 Attendance: 353; Referee: Leonhard Burghartwieser |

| 5 September 2023 Round of 16 | FV Illertissen | 3–0 | SpVgg Unterhaching | Illertissen |
| 19:00 UTC+2 | Gabriele 47'; Glessing 53'; Pöschl 90+2' | | | Stadium: Vöhlin-Stadion; Attendance: 320; Referee: Andreas Hummel |
