= 2024–25 FC Ingolstadt 04 season =

FC Ingolstadt 04
2024–25 season
- Chairman: Peter Jackwerth
- Manager: Sabrina Wittmann
- Stadium: Audi Sportpark
- 3. Liga: 10th
- DFB-Pokal: First round
- Bavarian Cup: Semi-finals
- Top goalscorer: League: Sebastian Grønning (17); All: Sebastian Grønning (21)
- Highest home attendance: 12,965 vs 1860 Munich, 31 August 2024, 3. Liga
- Lowest home attendance: 3,306 vs VfB Stuttgart II, 15 February 2025, 3. Liga
- Average home league attendance: 5,731
- Biggest win: 11–0 vs TSV Lohr (A), 7 August 2024, Bavarian Cup
- Biggest defeat: 0–3 vs Alemannia Aachen (H), 11 March 2025, 3. Liga; 0–3 vs Arminia Bielefeld (H), 27 April 2025, 3. Liga
Home colours	Away colours

The 2024–25 season was the 21st season in the history of FC Ingolstadt 04 and their third consecutive campaign in the 3. Liga. In addition to the domestic league, the club participated in the DFB-Pokal and the Bavarian Cup. Ingolstadt finished 10th in the 3. Liga, were eliminated in the DFB-Pokal first round by 1. FC Kaiserslautern, and reached the semi-finals of the Bavarian Cup. The season was the first under head coach Sabrina Wittmann, appointed in June 2024 as the first woman to lead a men's team in Germany's top three divisions.

== Transfers ==
=== In ===
Pos	Player	Transferred from	Fee	Date	Source
DF	(Germany) Niclas Dühring	(Germany) FC St. Pauli II	Undisclosed	15 May 2024	
FW	(Germany) Dennis Borkowski	(Germany) RB Leipzig	Undisclosed	7 June 2024	
GK	(Albania) Simon Simoni	(Germany) Eintracht Frankfurt	Loan	5 July 2024	
MF	(Germany) Max Besuschkow	(Germany) Hannover 96	Undisclosed	2 September 2024	

=== Out ===
Pos	Player	Transferred to	Fee	Date	Source
FW	(Germany) Jannik Mause	(Germany) 1. FC Kaiserslautern	Undisclosed	3 July 2024	
GK	(Germany) Markus Ponath	(Germany) FV Illertissen (loan)	Loan	13 June 2024	
FW	(Germany) Jeroen Krupa	(Germany) 1. FC Nürnberg II	Free transfer	18 June 2024	
MF	(United States) Bryang Kayo	(Germany) VfL Osnabrück (loan)	Loan	12 August 2024	
DF	(Germany) Tobias Schröck	— (released)	Contract expired	30 June 2024	
GK	(Albania) Simon Simoni	(Germany) 1. FC Kaiserslautern	Recalled	15 January 2025	

== Friendlies ==
=== Pre-season ===
6 July 2024 Friendly	FC Ingolstadt (Germany)	1–1	(Germany) VfB Eichstätt

12 July 2024 Friendly	FC Ingolstadt (Germany)	3–1	(Germany) VfR Mannheim

20 July 2024 Friendly	Empoli (Italy)	0–0	(Germany) FC Ingolstadt

27 July 2024 Friendly	FC Ingolstadt (Germany)	1–1	(Germany) SSV Ulm

4 September 2024 Friendly	FC Ingolstadt (Germany)	1–2	(Austria) WSG Tirol

14 November 2024 Friendly	FC Augsburg (Germany)	7–0	(Germany) FC Ingolstadt
14:00

== Competitions ==
=== Overall record ===
Competition	First match	Last match	Starting round	Final position	Record							
Competition	First match	Last match	Starting round	Final position	Pld	W	D	L	GF	GA	GD	Win %
3. Liga	4 August 2024	17 May 2025	Matchday 1		0	0	0	0	0	0	+0	—
Bavarian Cup	17 August 2024		First round	First round	1	0	0	1	1	2	−1	0.00
Total					1	0	0	1	1	2	−1	0.00

Source: Soccerway

=== 3. Liga ===
==== League table ====
Pos	Team	Pld	W	D	L	GF	GA	GD	Pts
8	Rot-Weiss Essen	38	16	8	14	55	54	+1	56
9	Wehen Wiesbaden	38	15	10	13	59	60	−1	55
10	FC Ingolstadt	38	14	12	12	72	63	+9	54
11	1860 Munich	38	15	8	15	57	61	−4	53
12	Alemannia Aachen	38	12	14	12	44	44	0	50

Source: DFB
Rules for classification: 1) Points; 2) Goal difference; 3) Goals scored; 4) Head-to-head results; 5) Head-to-head away goals scored; 6) Away goals scored; 7) Play-off.

==== Results summary ====
Overall								Home						Away					
Pld	W	D	L	GF	GA	GD	Pts	W	D	L	GF	GA	GD	W	D	L	GF	GA	GD
30	13	9	8	58	46	+12	48	9	5	2	30	21	+9	4	4	6	28	25	+3

Last updated: 30 March 2025.
Source: soccerway

==== Matches ====
The match schedule was released on 9 July 2024.

4 August 2024 1	FC Ingolstadt	2–1	Waldhof Mannheim
19:30

10 August 2024 2	Unterhaching	2–1	FC Ingolstadt	Unterhaching
14:00 CET	Knipping 38'; Stiefler (yellow card) 44' (goal) 65'; Nils Ortel (yellow card) 45'; Waidner (yellow card) 45+3'; Julian Kügel (yellow card) 86'	Report	Fröde (yellow card) 18'; Max Plath (yellow card) 37'; Testroet 45+1'; Kayo (yellow card) 79'; Heike (yellow card) 90'; Malone (yellow card) 90+5'	Stadium: Uhlsport Park; Attendance: 7,566; Referee: (Germany) Tobias Wittmann

24 August 2024 3	Saarbrücken	2–3	FC Ingolstadt	Saarbrücken
14:00 CET	Civeja (yellow card) 9' (goal) 45'; Brünker 26'; Rizzuto (yellow card) 54'; Zeitz (yellow card) 90+4'; Stehle (yellow card) 90+9'	Report	Kanuric (yellow card) 6'; Grønning 11'; Costly 20'; Borkowski (yellow card) 35'; Fröde 84'; Lorenz (yellow card) 90'	Stadium: Ludwigsparkstadion; Attendance: 10,736; Referee: (Germany) Christian Dingert

31 August 2024 4	FC Ingolstadt	1–2	1860 Munich	Ingolstadt
14:00 CET	Grønning (yellow card) 30'; Funk (yellow card) 64'; Testroet 86' (pen.)	Report	Wolfram 5'; Frey (yellow card) 33'; Philipp (yellow card) 37'; Guttau 64'	Stadium: Audi Sportpark; Attendance: 12,965; Referee: (Germany) Felix Bickel

14 September 2024 5	Stuttgart II	3–2	FC Ingolstadt	Aspach
14:00 CET	Münst 9' (yellow card) 82'; Frederik Schumann 19' (yellow card) 68'; Faghir 43' (pen.) (yellow card) 43'; Nothnagel (yellow card) 90+1'	Report	Malone (yellow card) 4'; Lorenz 29'; Keidel (yellow card) 38'; Fröde (yellow card) 42'; Lukas Laupheimer 62' (o.g.)	Stadium: WIRmachenDRUCK Arena; Attendance: 810; Referee: (Germany) Yannick Rupert

21 September 2024 6	FC Ingolstadt	2–2	Rot-Weiss Essen	Ingolstadt
14:00 CET	Lorenz 39'; Besuschkow (yellow card) 77' (goal) 79'	Report	Müsel 15'; Kaparos (yellow card) 47'; Arslan 60' (pen.)	Stadium: Audi Sportpark; Attendance: 4,002; Referee: (Germany) Fabienne Michel

24 September 2024 7	Sandhausen	4–3	FC Ingolstadt	Sandhausen
19:00 CET	Halimi 15'; Stolze (yellow card) 37'; Mühling (yellow card) 49'; Lorch (yellow card) 51' (goal) 64'; Baumann 60'; Otto 78'	Report	Borkowski 19'; Deichmann (yellow card) 40'; Fröde 53'; Funk (yellow card) 65'; Malone (yellow card) 90'; Kanuric 90+2'	Stadium: GP Stadion am Hardtwald; Attendance: 3,220; Referee: (Germany) Richard Hempel

29 September 2024 8	FC Ingolstadt	2–1	Hansa Rostock	Ingolstadt
13:30 CET	Costly (yellow card) 19'; Testroet 33'; Grønning 70'; Fröde (yellow card) 82'	Report	Felix Ruschke 59'; Lebeau (yellow card) 77'; Dirkner (yellow card) 77'	Stadium: Audi Sportpark; Attendance: 6,097; Referee: (Germany) Konrad Oldhafer

5 October 2024 9	Alemannia Aachen	1–1	FC Ingolstadt	Aachen
16:30 CET	Baxter 3' (pen.); Scepanik (yellow card) 59'; Felix Meyer (yellow card) 86'	Report	Costly (yellow card) 45'; Fröde 76' (yellow card) 86'; Kopacz (yellow card) 85'	Stadium: Tivoli; Attendance: 24,000; Referee: (Germany) Nico Fuchs

19 October 2024 10	FC Ingolstadt	1–1	Verl	Ingolstadt
14:00 CET	Grønning 64'; Lorenz (yellow card) 73'	Report	Benger 11'; Otto (yellow card) 52'; Lokotsch (yellow card) 70'; Stark (yellow card) 79'	Stadium: Audi Sportpark; Attendance: 5,291; Referee: (Germany) Timon Schulz

22 October 2024 11	Viktoria Köln	4–4	FC Ingolstadt	Köln
19:00 CET	Henning 20'; Saïd El Mala 24'; Enrique Lofolomo (yellow card) 36'; Florian Engelhardt (yellow card) 38'; Dietz (yellow card) 45+4'; Lobinger 51'; Serhat-Semih Güler 71'	Report	Kopacz 6' (yellow card) 77'; Fröde (yellow card) 36'; Grønning (yellow card) 45+4' (goal) 49' 54'; Lorenz (yellow card) 59'; Kanuric 86'	Stadium: Sportpark Höhenberg; Attendance: 2,582; Referee: (Germany) Kevin Behrens

25 October 2024 12	FC Ingolstadt	5–3	Borussia Dortmund II	Ingolstadt
19:00 CET	Grønning (yellow card) 18'; Deniz Zeitler 27'; Besuschkow (yellow card) 42' (goal) 78'; Deichmann 45' 74'; Kopacz 90'	Report	Rodney Elongo-Yombo 19'; Franz Roggow (yellow card) 20'; Babis Drakas 25'; David Lelle (yellow card) 59'; Felix Paschke (yellow card) 81'; Eberwein 85'	Stadium: Audi Sportpark; Attendance: 4,179; Referee: (Germany) Justin Hasmann

2 November 2024 13	FC Ingolstadt	1–1	Dynamo Dresden	Ingolstadt
14:00 CET	Fröde (yellow card) 17'; Besuschkow 43'; Costly (yellow card) 90+5'	Report	Casar (yellow card) 16'; Risch (yellow card) 30'; Kammerknecht (yellow card) 42'; Šapina (yellow card) 51'; Jonas Oehmichen 58'; Heise (yellow card) 79'; Marx (yellow card) 81'; Tom Berger (yellow card) 90+5'	Stadium: Audi Sportpark; Attendance: 8,712; Referee: (Germany) Florian Exner

10 November 2024 14	Hannover 96 II	0–4	FC Ingolstadt	Hanover
13:30 CET	Ezeh (yellow card) 13'; Walbrecht (yellow card) 38'	Report	Kanuric 14'; Lorenz 24'; Grønning 39'; Deniz Zeitler 57'	Stadium: Heinz-von-Heiden-Arena; Attendance: 700; Referee: (Germany) Michael Näther

24 November 2024 15	FC Ingolstadt	4–2	Osnabrück	Ingolstadt
16:30 CET	Grønning 20' 33' 48'; Kanuric (yellow card) 39'; Kopacz 56'; Costly (yellow card) 68'; Berkay Öztürk (yellow card) 73'	Report	Gnaase (yellow card) 16' (goal) 74'; Simakala 74'; Müller (yellow card) 75'; Beermann (red card) 76'; Engelhardt (yellow card) 84'; Semić (yellow card) 86'	Stadium: Audi Sportpark; Attendance: 4,819; Referee: (Germany) Fabienne Michel

29 November 2024 16	Arminia Bielefeld	1–0	FC Ingolstadt	Bielefeld
19:00 CET	Young (yellow card) 49'; Wörl (yellow card) 64'; Corboz (yellow card) 70'; Louis Oppie 76'; Julian Kania (yellow card) 86'; Russo (yellow card) 88'	Report	Keidel (yellow card) 68'; Elias Decker (yellow card) 70'	Stadium: SchücoArena; Attendance: 18,750; Referee: (Germany) Felix Bickel

7 December 2024 17	FC Ingolstadt	1–0	Erzgebirge Aue	Ingolstadt
14:00 CET	Besuschkow 48'; Funk (yellow card) 90+2'	Report	Majetschak (yellow card) 54'; Nkansah (yellow card) 76'; Fallmann (yellow card) 78'	Stadium: Audi Sportpark; Attendance: 4,883; Referee: (Germany) Mario Hildenbrand

14 December 2024 18	Wehen Wiesbaden	2–5	FC Ingolstadt	Wiesbaden
14:00 CET	Kaya 59' 79'	Report	Kanuric 25'; Deniz Zeitler 32' 57'; Besuschkow (yellow card) 43'; Grønning 74' 77' (pen.)	Stadium: Brita-Arena; Attendance: 3,084; Referee: (Germany) Nico Fuchs

20 December 2024 19	FC Ingolstadt	1–1	Energie Cottbus	Ingolstadt
19:00 CET	Elias Decker (yellow card) 53'; Fröde (yellow card) 54'; Grønning (yellow card) 54' (goal) 59'	Report	Slamar (yellow card) 19'; Phil Halbauer 23' (yellow card) 58'	Stadium: Audi Sportpark; Attendance: 6,593; Referee: (Germany) Sören Storks

19 January 2025 20	Waldhof Mannheim	0–0	FC Ingolstadt	Mannheim
19:30 CET		Report	Deichmann (red card) 58'; Kopacz (yellow card) 68'	Stadium: Carl-Benz-Stadion; Attendance: 8,146; Referee: (Germany) Marc Philip Eckermann

26 January 2025 21	FC Ingolstadt	3–1	Unterhaching	Ingolstadt
16:30 CET	Fröde (yellow card) 13'; Kanuric 30' (yellow card) 59'; Kopacz 41'; Cvjetinović (yellow card) 80'; Heike 90+5'	Report	Fröde 51' (o.g.); Timon Obermeier (yellow card) 85'	Stadium: Audi Sportpark; Attendance: 5,034; Referee: (Germany) Timon Schulz

1 February 2025 22	FC Ingolstadt	1–0	Saarbrücken	Ingolstadt
14:00 CET	Keidel (yellow card) 23'; Testroet 43'; Boevink (yellow card) 90+4'	Report	Rabihic (yellow card) 23'; Lasse Wilhelm (yellow card) 26'; Vasiliadis (yellow card) 63'; Zeitz (yellow card) 90+5'	Stadium: Audi Sportpark; Attendance: 4,585; Referee: (Germany) Florian Lechner

8 February 2025 23	1860 Munich	1–1	FC Ingolstadt	München
16:30 CET	Philipp Maier (yellow card) 1'; Wolfram (yellow card) 42' (goal) 64'	Report	Besuschkow (yellow card) 16'; Grønning 68'; Fröde (yellow card) 89'	Stadium: Grünwalder Stadion; Attendance: 15,000; Referee: (Germany) Patrick Schwengers

15 February 2025 24	FC Ingolstadt	1–1	Stuttgart II	Ingolstadt
14:00 CET	Deniz Zeitler 1'; Besuschkow (yellow card) 3'	Report	Meyer (yellow card) 5'; Seimen (yellow card) 20'; Kaden Amaniampong (yellow card) 31'; Kastanaras 79'; Jannik Hofmann (yellow card) 80'	Stadium: Audi Sportpark; Attendance: 3,306; Referee: (Germany) Nico Fuchs

=== Bavarian Cup ===
7 August 2024 First Round	Lohr	0-11	Ingolstadt	Lohr am Main
18:30 CET		Report		Stadium: Sportgelände Jahnstraße Loh

20 August 2024 Second Round	Hain	0-4	Ingolstadt	Laufach
18:30 CET		Report		Stadium: Sportgelände Seebachtal Laufach Platz 2

3 September 2024 Third Round	Würzburger Kickers	1-3	Ingolstadt	Würzburg
18:30 CET		Report		Stadium: Akon Arena

9 October 2024 Quarter Finals	Türkgücü München	0-3	Ingolstadt	München
18:30 CET		Report		Stadium: Grünwalder Stadion

22 March 2025 Semi Finals	Illertissen	1-0	Ingolstadt	Illertissen
14:00 CET		Report		Stadium: Voehlin-Stadium

=== DFB-Pokal ===
17 August 2024 First round	FC Ingolstadt	1–2	1. FC Kaiserslautern
15:30
