= Morris Schröter =

German footballer

Personal information
- Date of birth: 20 August 1995 (age 31)
- Place of birth: Germany
- Height: 1.83 m (6 ft 0 in)
- Position: Midfielder

Team information
- Current team: FSV Zwickau
- Number: 37

Youth career
- –2008: FC Grün-Weiß Wolfen
- 2008–2014: 1. FC Magdeburg

Senior career*
| Years | Team | Apps | (Gls) |
| 2014–2015 | 1. FC Magdeburg | 22 | (2) |
| 2015–2021 | FSV Zwickau | 168 | (20) |
| 2021–2022 | Dynamo Dresden | 31 | (1) |
| 2022–2023 | Hansa Rostock | 20 | (0) |
| 2023–2026 | 1860 Munich | 56 | (8) |
| 2026– | FSV Zwickau | 4 | (1) |
- * Club domestic league appearances and goals as of 20 November 2026

Morris Schröter (born 20 August 1995) is a German professional footballer who plays as a midfielder.

== Club career ==
In July 2021, Schröter signed with Dynamo Dresden.

Before the 2022–23 season, he moved to Hansa Rostock on a two-year contract.

On 18 July 2023, Schröter transferred to 1860 Munich.

On 23 October 2026, Morris Schröter returned to FSV Zwickau and signed a contract running until 30 June 2028.

== Career statistics ==
As of match played 20 November 2026

Appearances and goals by club, season and competition
| Club | Season | League | | | National Cup | | Other | | Total | |
| Club | Season | Division | Apps | Goals | Apps | Goals | Apps | Goals | Apps | Goals |
|---|---|---|---|---|---|---|---|---|---|---|
| 1. FC Magdeburg | 2013–14 | Regionalliga Nordost | 11 | 1 | 1 | 0 | — | | 12 | 1 |
| 1. FC Magdeburg | 2014–15 | Regionalliga Nordost | 11 | 1 | — | | 1 (Note: Appearance in the Saxony-Anhalt Cup) | 1 | 12 | 2 |
| 1. FC Magdeburg | Total | | 22 | 2 | 1 | 0 | 1 | 1 | 24 | 3 |
| FSV Zwickau | 2015–16 | Regionalliga Nordost | 17 | 0 | — | | 6 (Note: Four appearances and one goal in Appearance in the Saxony Cup and Two appearance in the Regionalliga Promotion Playoff) | 1 | 23 | 1 |
| FSV Zwickau | 2016–17 | 3. Liga | 27 | 0 | — | | 4 (Note: Appearance in the Saxony Cup) | 1 | 31 | 1 |
| FSV Zwickau | 2017–18 | 3. Liga | 26 | 0 | — | | 2 | 0 | 28 | 0 |
| FSV Zwickau | 2018–19 | 3. Liga | 26 | 0 | — | | 3 | 0 | 29 | 0 |
| FSV Zwickau | 2019–20 | 3. Liga | 36 | 7 | — | | 1 | 0 | 37 | 7 |
| FSV Zwickau | 2020–21 | 3. Liga | 36 | 10 | — | | 1 | 1 | 37 | 11 |
| FSV Zwickau | Total | | 168 | 17 | 0 | 0 | 17 | 3 | 185 | 20 |
| Dynamo Dresden | 2021–22 | 2. Bundesliga | 31 | 1 | 2 | 0 | — | | 33 | 1 |
| Hamsa Rostock | 2022–23 | 2. Bundesliga | 20 | 0 | 1 | 0 | — | | 21 | 0 |
| 1860 Munich | 2023–24 | 3. Liga | 33 | 7 | — | | — | | 33 | 7 |
| 1860 Munich | 2024–25 | 3. Liga | 17 | 1 | — | | 2 (Note: Appearance in the Bavarian Cup) | 1 | 19 | 2 |
| 1860 Munich | 2025–26 | 3. Liga | 6 | 0 | — | | 1 | 1 | 7 | 1 |
| 1860 Munich | Total | | 56 | 8 | 0 | 0 | 3 | 2 | 59 | 10 |
| FSV Zwickau | 2026–27 | Regionalliga Nordost | 4 | 1 | — | | 1 | 0 | 5 | 1 |
| Career Total | | | 301 | 29 | 4 | 0 | 22 | 6 | 327 | 44 |
