= Sōichirō Kōzuki =

Japanese footballer (born 2000)

Sōichirō Kōzuki 上月 壮一郎
Personal information
- Date of birth: 22 December 2000 (age 25)
- Place of birth: Uji, Japan
- Height: 1.82 m (6 ft 0 in)
- Positions: Right midfielder; winger

Team information
- Current team: Shonan Bellmare
- Number: 38

Youth career
- 2016–2018: Kyoto Sanga

Senior career*
Years	Team	Apps	(Gls)
2018–2022	Kyoto Sanga	18	(0)
2022	1. FC Düren	11	(5)
2022–2023	Schalke 04 II	17	(11)
2023–2024	Schalke 04	10	(1)
2024	→ Górnik Zabrze (loan)	18	(1)
2024–2025	1860 Munich	33	(3)
2025–2026	Viktoria Köln	19	(2)
2026–	Shonan Bellmare	0	(0)

International career
2015	Japan U16	3	(1)
2017	Japan U17	6	(0)
2018	Japan U18	2	(0)
2018	Japan U19	1	(0)
- * Club domestic league appearances and goals as of 29 May 2026

Sōichirō Kōzuki (上月 壮一郎, Kōzuki Sōichirō; born 22 December 2000) is a Japanese professional footballer who plays as a winger for Shonan Bellmare.

== Club career ==
Kōzuki was promoted to the first team of J2 League club Kyoto Sanga in 2018.

He joined German club 1. FC Düren of the fifth-tier Mittelrheinliga in February 2022.

On 26 August 2022, Kōzuki agreed to join Bundesliga side Schalke 04, where he was initially assigned to the reserve team. However, following his performances in the Regionalliga West, in December of the same year the Japanese player was promoted to the first team and signed his first professional contract in the process, by penning a deal until 2025, with an option for an automatic extension based on a certain number of appearances. He scored his first Bundesliga goal in his second debut against RB Leipzig.

On 30 January 2024, Kōzuki moved on loan to Górnik Zabrze in Poland until the end of 2024, with an option to buy.

On 3 September 2024, 3. Liga club 1860 Munich announced that they had signed Kōzuki. On 26 August 2025, 1860 announced that Kōzuki had left the club after his contract was terminated by mutual agreement. On the same day, he signed with Viktoria Köln, also in the 3. Liga.

On 15 June 2026, Kōzuki returned to Japan and joined Shonan Bellmare.

== International career ==
Kōzuki has represented Japan at various youth international levels, having played for all the national teams from the under-16 to the under-19 setup.

== Career statistics ==
As of match played 10 May 2026

Appearances and goals by club, season and competition
Club	Season	League			National cup (Note: Includes Emperor's Cup, DFB-Pokal)		Other		Total	
Club	Season	Division	Apps	Goals	Apps	Goals	Apps	Goals	Apps	Goals
Kyoto Sanga	2018	J2 League	2	0	0	0	—		2	0
Kyoto Sanga	2019	J2 League	3	0	0	0	—		3	0
Kyoto Sanga	2020	J2 League	11	0	0	0	—		11	0
Kyoto Sanga	2021	J2 League	2	0	2	1	—		4	1
Kyoto Sanga	Total		18	0	2	1	—		20	1
1. FC Düren	2021–22	Mittelrheinliga	11	5	—		—		11	5
Schalke 04 II	2022–23	Regionalliga West	14	8	—		—		14	8
Schalke 04 II	2023–24	Regionalliga West	3	3	—		—		3	3
Schalke 04 II	Total		17	11	—		—		17	11
Schalke 04	2022–23	Bundesliga	5	1	—		—		5	1
Schalke 04	2023–24	2. Bundesliga	5	0	1	0	—		6	0
Schalke 04	Total		10	1	1	0	—		11	1
Górnik Zabrze (loan)	2023–24	Ekstraklasa	14	1	—		—		14	1
Górnik Zabrze (loan)	2024–25	Ekstraklasa	4	0	—		—		4	0
Górnik Zabrze (loan)	Total		18	1	—		—		18	1
1860 Munich	2024–25	3. Liga	32	3	—		1 (Note: Appearances in the Bavarian Cup)	0	33	3
1860 Munich	2025–26	3. Liga	1	0	—		2	0	3	0
1860 Munich	Total		33	3	—		3	0	36	3
Viktoria Köln	2025–26	3. Liga	19	2	—		3 (Note: Appearances in Middle Rhine Cup)	1	22	3
Career total			126	23	3	1	6	1	135	25
