= Tim Kloss =

German footballer (born 2004)

Personal information
- Date of birth: 5 June 2004 (age 22)
- Place of birth: Germany
- Height: 1.90 m (6 ft 3 in)
- Position: Midfielder

Team information
- Current team: Viktoria Köln
- Number: 18

Youth career
- 2017–2023: 1860 Munich

Senior career*
Years	Team	Apps	(Gls)
2023–2025	1860 Munich II	18	(3)
2023–2025	1860 Munich	22	(1)
2025–	Viktoria Köln	34	(6)
- * Club domestic league appearances and goals as of 29 May 2026

Tim Kloss (born 5 June 2004) is a German professional footballer who plays as a midfielder for 3. Liga club Viktoria Köln.

== Career ==
Kloss came up through the youth academy of 1860 Munich. In 2023, Kloss came up to the reserve team and between 18 March and 27 May made seven appearances for the reserve team. He made a further two appearances the following season. Kloss played for the first team in the Bavarian Cup first round and second round.

On 2 June 2025, Kloss signed with Viktoria Köln.

== Career statistics ==
As of match played 23 May 2026

Appearances and goals by club, season and competition
Club	Season	League			DFB-Pokal		Other		Total	
Club	Season	Division	Apps	Goals	Apps	Goals	Apps	Goals	Apps	Goals
1860 Munich II	2022–23	Bayernliga Süd	7	0	—		—		7	0
1860 Munich II	2023–24	Bayernliga Süd	10	3	—		—		10	3
1860 Munich II	2024–25	Bayernliga Süd	1	0	—		—		1	0
1860 Munich II	Total		18	3	—		—		18	3
1860 Munich	2023–24	3. Liga	4	1	—		2 (Note: Appearances in Bavarian Cup)	0	6	1
1860 Munich	2024–25	3. Liga	18	0	—		2	0	20	0
1860 Munich	Total		22	1	—		4	0	26	1
Viktoria Köln	2025–26	3. Liga	34	6	1	0	5 (Note: Appearances in Middle Rhine Cup)	0	40	6
Career total			74	10	1	0	9	0	84	10
