= Simon Simoni =

Albanian footballer (born 2004)

Personal information
- Date of birth: 14 July 2004 (age 22)
- Place of birth: Lezhë, Albania
- Height: 1.92 m (6 ft 4 in)
- Position: Goalkeeper

Team information
- Current team: Luzern
- Number: 1

Youth career
- 2013–2014: Besëlidhja
- 2014–2021: Shënkolli

Senior career*
Years	Team	Apps	(Gls)
2018–2021	Shënkolli	4	(0)
2021–2023	Dinamo Tirana	26	(0)
2023–2026	Eintracht Frankfurt	0	(0)
2023–2024	Eintracht Frankfurt II	22	(0)
2024–2025	→ FC Ingolstadt 04 (loan)	1	(0)
2025–2026	→ 1. FC Kaiserslautern (loan)	4	(0)
2026–	Luzern	3	(0)

International career^{‡}
2020	Albania U16	3	(0)
2019–2020	Albania U17	2	(0)
2021	Albania U18	2	(0)
2021–2022	Albania U19	8	(0)
2021	Albania U20	2	(0)
2022–	Albania U21	11	(0)
2025–	Albania	1	(0)
- * Club domestic league appearances and goals as of 28 September 2026 ‡ National team caps and goals as of 4 September 2025

Simon Simoni (Albanian pronunciation: [ˈsimɔn siˈmɔni]; born 14 July 2004) is an Albanian professional footballer who plays as a goalkeeper for Swiss Super League club Luzern. He represents Albania at both senior and under-21 level.

After progressing through youth systems at Besëlidhja in Albania, he made senior appearances at age of 17 for Dinamo Tirana before moving to Germany in early 2023 with Eintracht Frankfurt. After a loan to Ingolstadt 04, he joined 1. FC Kaiserslautern on 1 year-and-half loan in January 2025.

Having previously appeared for the Albania at every youth level from under-16 to under-21, he made his senior debut in 2025.

== Club career ==
On 1 January 2023, Simoni signed for Bundesliga club Eintracht Frankfurt on a four-and-a-half-year contract.

On 5 July 2024, Simoni moved on loan to 3. Liga club FC Ingolstadt 04.

On 15 January 2025, he was loaned to 1. FC Kaiserslautern in 2. Bundesliga for 18 months.

On 29 October 2025, Simoni made his first appearance of the season for Kaiserslautern in the DFB-Pokal second round match against SpVgg Greuther Fürth, keeping a clean sheet in a 1–0 away win that secured qualification to the round of 16. He made six saves and was rated the best player of the match, earning an average rating around 8.0. The match also marked his return to action after a seven-month absence.

On 21 July 2026, Simoni signed a three-year contract with Luzern in Switzerland.

== International career ==
Simoni represented Albania in their youth national teams, including U16, U17, U18, U19, U20 and U21. Simoni received his first senior call-up in June 2022 under coach Edoardo Reja for a friendly against Estonia, following the simultaneous absences of regular goalkeepers Etrit Berisha and Thomas Strakosha. He was considered back-up to Gentian Selmani but remained an unused substitute. Under coach Sylvinho, he was occasionally included in squads as a reserve behind Berisha, Strakosha and Elhan Kastrati. On 27 May 2024, he was named in the 27-man preliminary squad for UEFA Euro 2024 as one of four goalkeepers, but was omitted when the squad was reduced to 26 players ahead of the tournament.

In August 2024, he was again called up for the start of the 2024–25 UEFA Nations League A, serving as third-choice behind Strakosha and Alen Sherri.

In September 2025, Simoni was called up for a friendly against Gibraltar and a 2026 FIFA World Cup qualifier against Latvia, being added to the squad as a replacement for Kastrati, who withdrew due to injury. He made his senior debut on 4 September against Gibraltar, coming on as a substitute for Mario Dajsinani in the 61st minute, as Albania kept a clean sheet in a 0–1 away victory.

== Career statistics ==
=== Club ===
As of match played 9 August 2026

Appearances and goals by club, season and competition
Club	Season	League			National cup		Europe		Other		Total	
Club	Season	Division	Apps	Goals	Apps	Goals	Apps	Goals	Apps	Goals	Apps	Goals
Shënkolli	2018–19	Kategoria e Parë	1	0	0	0	–		0	0	1	0
Shënkolli	2019–20	Kategoria e Parë	2	0	0	0	–		0	0	2	0
Shënkolli	2020-21	Kategoria e Dytë	1	0	0	0	—		0	0	1	0
Shënkolli	Total		4	0	0	0	–		0	0	4	0
Dinamo Tirana	2021-22	Kategoria Superiore	16	0	2	0	–		0	0	18	0
Dinamo Tirana	2022–23	Kategoria e Parë	10	0	1	0	–		0	0	11	0
Dinamo Tirana	Total		26	0	3	0	–		0	0	29	0
Eintracht Frankfurt	2022–23	Bundesliga	0	0	0	0	0	0	—		0	0
Eintracht Frankfurt	2026–27	Bundesliga	0	0	0	0	0	0	—		0	0
Eintracht Frankfurt	Total		0	0	0	0	0	0	0	0	0	0
Eintracht Frankfurt II	2022–23	Hessenliga	8	0	–		–		–		8	0
Eintracht Frankfurt II	2023–24	Regionalliga Südwest	14	0	–		–		–		14	0
Eintracht Frankfurt II	Total		22	0	–		–		–		22	0
Ingolstadt 04	2024–25	3. Liga	1	0	1	0	–		2 (Note: Appearances in Bavarian Cup)	0	4	0
1. FC Kaiserslautern (loan)	2024–25	2. Bundesliga	3	0	–		–		–		3	0
1. FC Kaiserslautern (loan)	2025–26	2. Bundesliga	1	0	2	0	–		–		3	0
1. FC Kaiserslautern (loan)	Total		4	0	2	0	–		–		6	0
Luzern	2026–27	Swiss Super League	3	0	–		–		–		3	0
Career total			60	0	6	0	0	0	2	0	68	0

=== International ===
As of match played 4 September 2025

Appearances and goals by national team and year
National team	Year	Apps	Goals
Albania
Albania	2025	1	0
Total		1	0
