= Joshua Putze =

German footballer

Personal information
- Date of birth: 2 December 1994 (age 31)
- Place of birth: Berlin, Germany
- Height: 1.85 m (6 ft 1 in)
- Position: Midfielder

Team information
- Current team: FSV Zwickau
- Number: 23

Youth career
- –2006: SG Glienick
- 2006–2012: Energie Cottbus

Senior career*
Years	Team	Apps	(Gls)
2012–2014	Energie Cottbus II	38	(4)
2014	Energie Cottbus	1	(0)
2014–2016	BFC Dynamo	60	(6)
2016–2017	Energie Cottbus	33	(3)
2017–2019	Sportfreunde Lotte	37	(1)
2019–2021	Union Fürstenwalde	26	(4)
2021–2025	Energie Cottbus	60	(7)
2025–	FSV Zwickau	22	(0)
- * Club domestic league appearances and goals as of 20 October 2026

Joshua Putze (born 2 December 1994) is a German footballer who plays as a midfielder for FSV Zwickau.
