= Boipelo Mashigo =

South African soccer player

Personal information
- Date of birth: 5 April 2003 (age 23)
- Place of birth: Johannesburg, South Africa
- Height: 1.80 m (5 ft 11 in)
- Position: Winger

Team information
- Current team: Rot-Weiß Erfurt
- Number: 21

Youth career
- –2016: SuperSport United
- 2016–2018: DFI Bad Aibling
- 2018–2020: SpVgg Unterhaching

Senior career*
Years	Team	Apps	(Gls)
2020–2025	SpVgg Unterhaching	94	(7)
2025–	Rot-Weiß Erfurt	8	(0)
- * Club domestic league appearances and goals as of 22 June 2026

Boipelo Mashigo (born 5 April 2003) is a South African professional soccer player who plays as a winger for Regionalliga Nordost club Rot-Weiß Erfurt.

== Club career ==
Born in Johannesburg, Mashigo started his youth career at SuperSport United before joining DFI Bad Aibling in 2016. He remained at DFI Bad Aibling for two years before joining SpVgg Unterhaching's academy in 2018. He made his senior debut on 25 November 2020 as a half-time substitute for Alexander Fuchs in a 2–0 3. Liga defeat away to Dynamo Dresden. He made 8 appearances across the 2020–21 season.

== Career statistics ==
As of match played 24 September 2022

Appearances and goals by club, season and competition
Club	Season	League			National Cup		Other		Total	
Club	Season	Division	Apps	Goals	Apps	Goals	Apps	Goals	Apps	Goals
SpVgg Unterhaching	2020–21	3. Liga	8	0	—		0	0	8	0
SpVgg Unterhaching	2021–22	Regionalliga Bayern	31	3	—		0	0	31	3
SpVgg Unterhaching	2022–23	Regionalliga Bayern	13	3	—		0	0	13	3
Career total			52	6	0	0	0	0	52	6

== Honours ==
SpVgg Unterhaching

- Regionalliga Bayern: 2022–23
