= Fabian Schubert =

Austrian footballer

Personal information
- Date of birth: 29 August 1994 (age 32)
- Place of birth: Eisenkappel-Vellach, Austria
- Height: 1.94 m (6 ft 4 in)
- Position: Forward

Team information
- Current team: ASK Voitsberg
- Number: 9

Youth career
- VST Völkermarkt
- AKA Wolfsberger

Senior career*
Years	Team	Apps	(Gls)
2010–2015	VST Völkermarkt	102	(56)
2015–2017	SV Ried	13	(2)
2017–2018	Sturm Graz II	20	(12)
2017–2018	Sturm Graz	6	(0)
2018–2019	TSV Hartberg	12	(0)
2019–2021	Blau-Weiß Linz	56	(48)
2021–2024	St. Gallen	59	(10)
2024–2025	1860 Munich	24	(2)
2025–	ASK Voitsberg	29	(43)
- * Club domestic league appearances and goals as of 27 June 2026

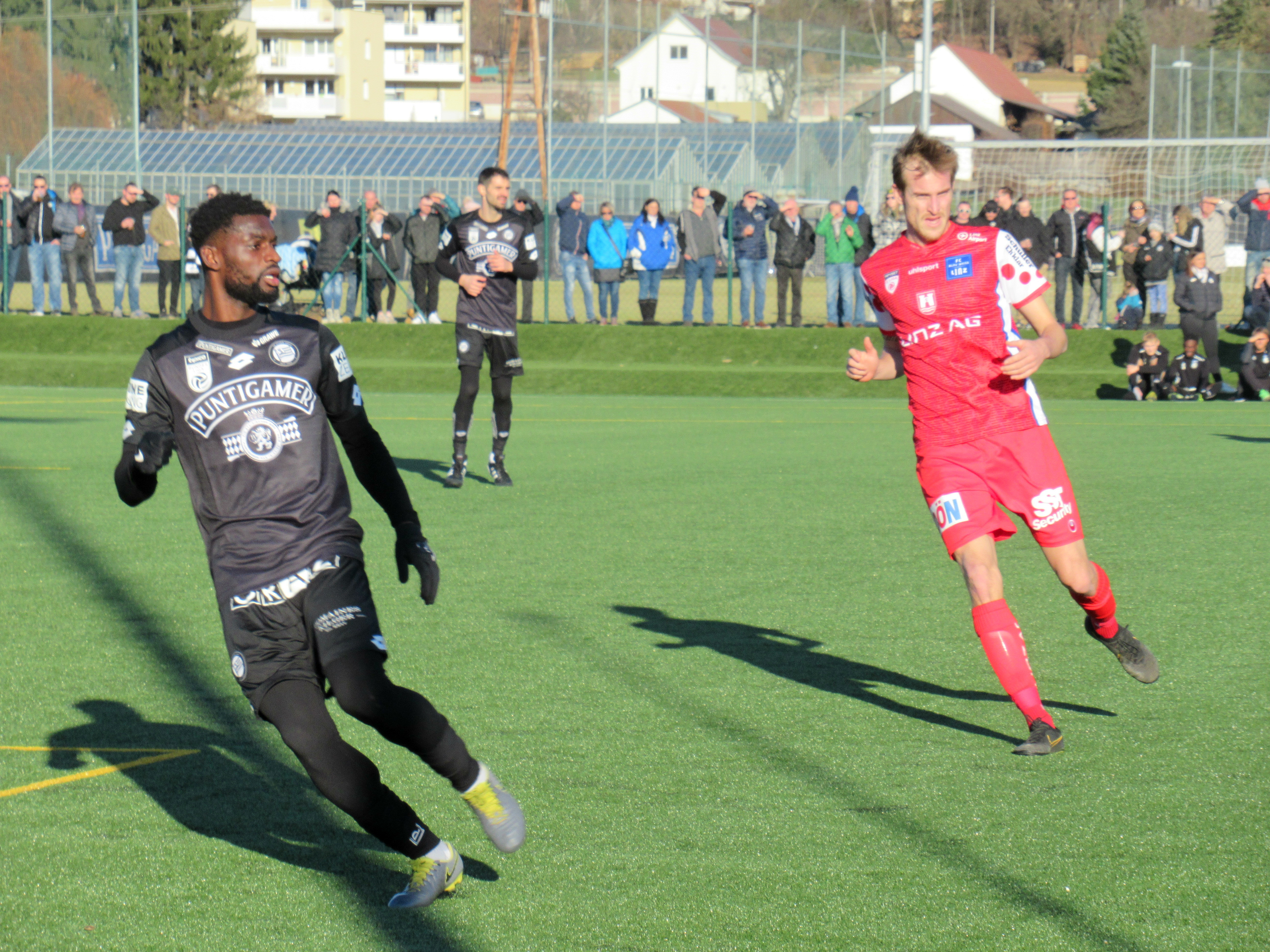
Fabian Schubert in 2020

Fabian Schubert (born 29 August 1994) is an Austrian professional footballer who plays as a forward for ASK Voitsberg.

== Career ==
On 21 June 2019, FC Blau-Weiß Linz confirmed, that they had signed Schubert on a one-year deal.

On 18 June 2021, he joined St. Gallen in Switzerland on a two-year contract.

For the 2024–25 season, Schubert moved to 1860 Munich in German 3. Liga. On 10 July 2025, Schubert left 1860 Munich.

== Honours ==
Individual

- Swiss Cup top scorer: 2021–22 (shared)
