= Eliot Muteba =

Angolan footballer (born 2003)

Personal information
- Full name: Pedro Eliot Narciso Muteba
- Date of birth: 20 June 2003 (age 23)
- Place of birth: Dietersburg, Germany
- Height: 1.69 m (5 ft 7 in)
- Positions: Winger; striker

Team information
- Current team: Würzburger Kickers
- Number: 7

Senior career*
Years	Team	Apps	(Gls)
2022–2023	1. FC Nürnberg II	50	(12)
2024–2025	TSV 1860 Munich	10	(0)
2024–2025	TSV 1860 Munich II	7	(3)
2025	→ FV Illertissen (loan)	12	(1)
2025–	Würzburger Kickers	29	(3)

International career^{‡}
2024–	Angola	2	(0)
Medal record
Men's football
Representing Angola
COSAFA Cup
Winner	2024 South Africa
- * Club domestic league appearances and goals as of 28 June 2026 ‡ National team caps and goals as of 7 July 2024

Pedro Eliot Narciso Muteba (born 20 June 2003) is a footballer who plays as a winger or striker for Regionalliga club Würzburger Kickers. Born in Germany, he is an Angola international.

== Early life ==
Muteba was born in 2003 in Germany. He is the younger brother of German footballer Daniel Muteba.

== Career ==
In 2022, Muteba signed for German side 1. FC Nürnberg II. He was regarded as one of the club's most important players. In 2024, he signed for German side TSV 1860 Munich.

== Style of play ==
Muteba mainly operates as a winger or striker. He is known for his speed.

== Personal life ==
Muteba is of Angolan descent. He is a native of Lower Bavaria, Germany.

== Honours ==
Angola

- COSAFA Cup: 2024
