= Dennis Waidner =

German footballer (born 2001)

Personal information
- Date of birth: 8 February 2001 (age 25)
- Place of birth: Günzburg, Germany
- Height: 1.74 m (5 ft 9 in)
- Position: Right-back

Team information
- Current team: SC Verl
- Number: 8

Youth career
- –2014: SSV Ulm
- 2014–2020: Bayern Munich

Senior career*
Years	Team	Apps	(Gls)
2020–2021	Bayern Munich II	30	(0)
2021–2022	Würzburger Kickers	30	(0)
2022–2025	SpVgg Unterhaching	89	(0)
2025–	SC Verl	36	(1)
- * Club domestic league appearances and goals as of 28 May 2026

Dennis Waidner (born 8 February 2001) is a German professional footballer who plays as a right-back for 3. Liga club SC Verl.

== Career ==
On 1 September 2022, Waidner joined Regionalliga Bayern club SpVgg Unterhaching from recently relegated Würzburger Kickers. He made his debut the following day, coming on as a substitute in the 75th minute for Max Lamby in a 2–1 home loss to SpVgg Hankofen-Hailing.

On 19 July 2024, Waidner extended his contract with SpVgg Unterhaching.

On 16 June 2025, Waidner moved to SC Verl in 3. Liga.

== Career statistics ==
As of match played on 27 October 2023

Appearances and goals by club, season and competition
Club	Season	League			DFB-Pokal		Continental		Other		Total	
Club	Season	Division	Apps	Goals	Apps	Goals	Apps	Goals	Apps	Goals	Apps	Goals
Bayern Munich II	2019–20	3. Liga	6	0	—		—		—		6	0
Bayern Munich II	2020–21	3. Liga	24	0	—		—		—		24	0
Bayern Munich II	Total		30	0	—		—		—		30	0
Würzburger Kickers	2021–22	3. Liga	30	0	1	0	—		4 (Note: Appearances in the Bavarian Cup)	1	35	1
SpVgg Unterhaching	2022–23	Regionalliga Bayern	23	0	0	0	—		2 (Note: Appearances in the 2022–23 Regionalliga promotion play-offs)	0	25	0
SpVgg Unterhaching	2023–24	3. Liga	13	0	1	0	—		1	0	15	0
SpVgg Unterhaching	Total		36	0	1	0	0	0	3	0	40	0
Career total			96	0	2	0	—		7	1	105	1

== Honours ==
SpVgg Unterhaching

- Regionalliga Bayern: 2022–23
