= Sebastian Grønning =

Danish footballer (born 1997)

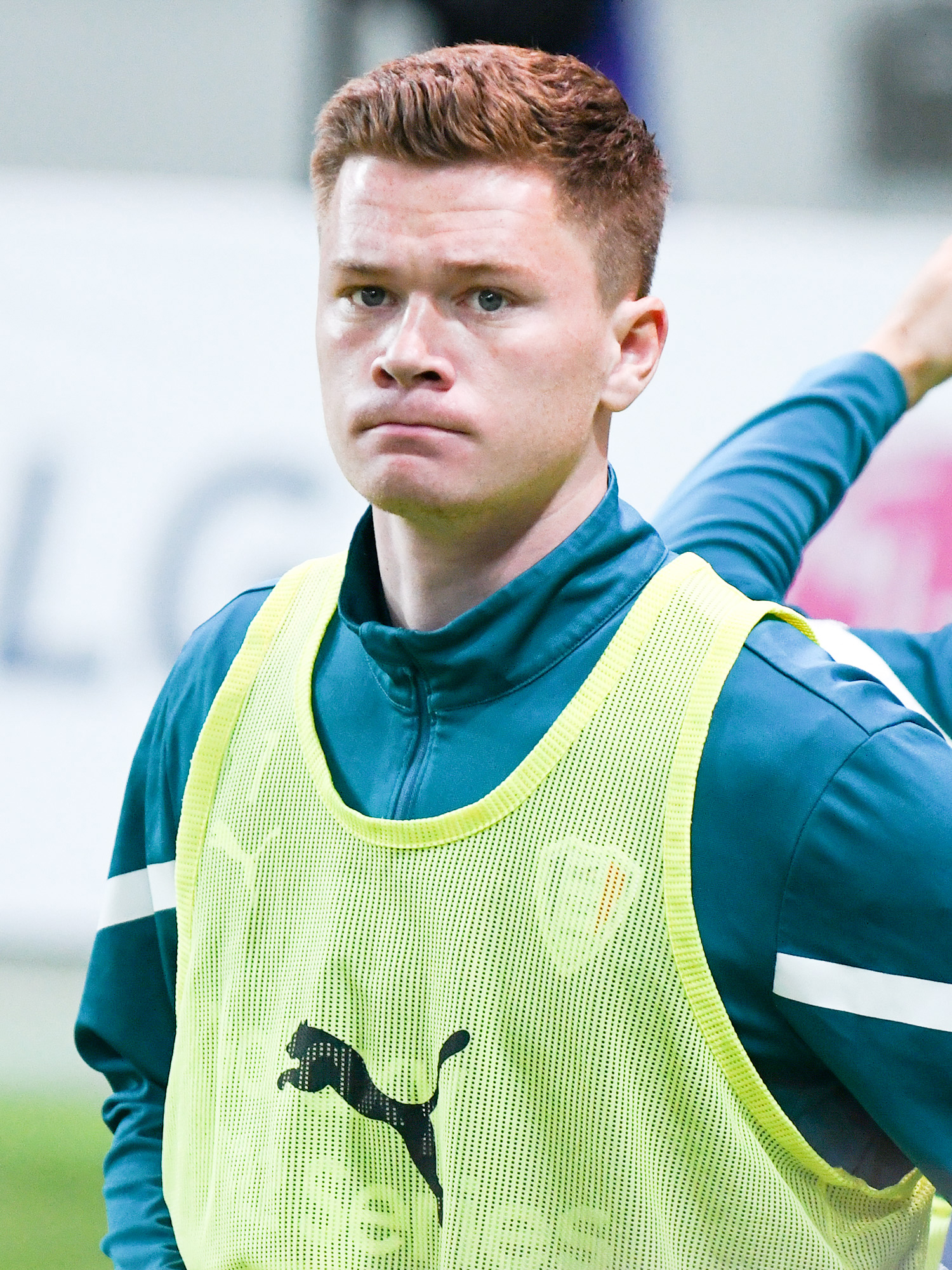
- Grønning with Suwon Samsung Bluewings in 2022

Personal information
- Full name: Sebastian Grønning Andersen
- Date of birth: 3 February 1997 (age 29)
- Place of birth: Aalborg, Denmark
- Height: 1.88 m (6 ft 2 in)
- Position: Forward

Team information
- Current team: Hertha BSC
- Number: 17

Youth career
- Aalborg KFUM
- AaB

Senior career*
Years	Team	Apps	(Gls)
2016–2017	AaB	12	(0)
2017–2019	Hobro	37	(2)
2019–2020	Skive	31	(14)
2020–2022	Viborg	47	(29)
2022	Suwon Bluewings	14	(0)
2022–2023	AGF	6	(1)
2023	OFI	8	(1)
2023–2024	Castellón	6	(0)
2024–2025	FC Ingolstadt	45	(25)
2025–	Hertha BSC	27	(5)

International career
2013	Denmark U17	2	(0)
- * Club domestic league appearances and goals as of 12:49, 21 October 2026 (UTC)

Sebastian Grønning Andersen (born 20 August 1997) is a Danish professional footballer who plays as a forward for 2. Bundesliga club Hertha BSC.

== Career ==
=== AaB ===
In 2016, At the age of 19, Grønning was promoted to the first team squad of AaB and concomitantly signed his first professional contract with the club.

Grønning made his debut for AaB on 17 July 2016. He started on the bench, but replaced Christian Bassogog in the 66th minute of a 1–1 draw against AC Horsens in the Danish Superliga.

At the end of September 2016, Grønning suffered an injury in one of the ligaments in his ankle. This injury kept him out until about February 2017.

=== Hobro ===
On 6 July 2017, newly promoted Danish Superliga club Hobro IK announced the signing of Grønning on a two-year deal. He left the club at the end of the 2018–19 season.

=== Skive ===
On 19 July 2019, Skive IK announced that they had signed Grønning on one-year contract. He ended the season as Skive's topscorer with 14 goals ind 31 league appearances.

=== Viborg FF ===
After a strong season with Skive, Viborg FF confirmed on 27 July 2020, that Grønning had joined the club on a three-year contract.

In his first season at the club, Viborg FF won the Danish 1st Division, securing promotion to the Danish Superliga. Grønning finished as the league top scorer with 23 goals in 32 matches, including a hattrick in the final game of the season against HB Køge.

=== Suwon Samsung Bluewings ===
On 5 January 2022, Grønning signed a two-year contract with K League 1 club Suwon Samsung Bluewings, with a one-year option. Grønning left Suwon at the end of August 2022, as his contract was terminated.

=== AGF ===
On transfer deadline day, 31 August 2022, Grønning joined Danish Superliga club AGF on a deal until June 2025. Head coach Uwe Rösler dropped Grønning from the squad for an upcoming fixture against FC Copenhagen on 13 November 2022, and did not return for the remainder of the year.

=== OFI ===
After five months in AGF, Grønning moved abroad once again, this time signing a deal with Super League Greece club OFI until June 2025. Half a year later, in August 2023, the parties terminated the contract, reportedly due to Grønning not receiving his salary regularly.

=== Castellón ===
On 17 August, seven days after parting ways with OFI, Grønning joined Spanish Primera Federación side CD Castellón. Although the club did not disclose how long a contract the Dane had signed, several sources reported that Grønning had signed a one-year contract with an option for a further year.

=== FC Ingolstadt ===
On 31 January 2024, Grønning moved to German 3. Liga side FC Ingolstadt. On 4 February 2024, Grønning made his debut for Ingolstadt when he was substituted after 39 minutes in the league match against Dynamo Dresden. Seven minutes after his substitution, he scored his debut goal.

A year after his move, Grønning had scored 27 goals in 41 games for Ingolstadt, which had attracted the attention of several 2. Bundesliga clubs.

=== Hertha BSC ===
On 6 May 2025, German 2. Bundesliga club Hertha BSC confirmed that Grønning would join the club on a free transfer ahead of the 2025–26 season, following the expiration of his contract with FC Ingolstadt 04.

== Career statistics ==
As of match played 20 September 2025

Appearances and goals by club, season and competition
Club	Season	League			National cup (Note: Includes Danish Cup, Korean FA Cup, Copa del Rey, DFB-Pokal)		Other		Total	
Club	Season	Division	Apps	Goals	Apps	Goals	Apps	Goals	Apps	Goals
AaB	2016–17	Danish Superliga	12	0	1	0	—		13	0
Hobro	2017–18	Danish Superliga	14	2	2	1	—		16	3
Hobro	2018–19	Danish Superliga	23	0	1	1	2 (Note: Appearances in Danish Superliga relegation play-offs)	0	26	1
Hobro	Total		37	2	3	2	2	0	42	4
Skive	2019–20	Danish 1st Division	31	14	—		—		31	14
Viborg	2020–21	Danish 1. Division	30	23	—		—		30	23
Viborg	2021–22	Danish Superliga	17	6	1	0	—		18	6
Viborg	Total		47	29	1	0	—		48	29
Suwon Bluewings	2022	K League 1	14	0	1	1	—		15	1
AGF	2022–23	Danish Superliga	6	1	3	0	—		9	1
OFI	2022–23	Super League Greece	8	1	—		—		8	1
Castellón	2023–24	Primera Federación	6	0	2	2	—		8	2
FC Ingolstadt 04	2023–24	3. Liga	15	8	—		3 (Note: Appearances in Bavarian Cup)	2	18	10
FC Ingolstadt 04	2024–25	3. Liga	30	17	1	0	3	4	34	21
FC Ingolstadt 04	Total		45	25	1	0	6	6	52	31
Hertha BSC	2025–26	2. Bundesliga	20	3	2	1	—		22	4
Hertha BSC	2026-27	2. Bundesliga	11	5	2	0	—		13	5
Hertha BSC	Total		31	8	4	1	6	6	35	9
Career total			237	80	16	6	8	6	261	92

== Honours ==
Viborg

- Danish 1st Division: 2020–21

Individual

- Danish 1st Division Golden Boot: 2020–21
