= Jeroen Krupa =

German footballer (born 2003)

Personal information
- Date of birth: 26 April 2003 (age 23)
- Place of birth: Trier, Germany
- Height: 1.77 m (5 ft 10 in)
- Position: Forward

Team information
- Current team: SpVgg Unterhaching
- Number: 9

Youth career
- 2016–2018: 1. FC Kaiserslautern
- 2018–2020: TuS Mosella Schweich
- 2020–2021: FC Ingolstadt

Senior career*
Years	Team	Apps	(Gls)
2021–2024	FC Ingolstadt	7	(0)
2022–2024	FC Ingolstadt II	34	(19)
2024–2025	1. FC Nürnberg II	21	(9)
2025–	SpVgg Unterhaching	32	(12)
- * Club domestic league appearances and goals as of 27 September 2026

Jeroen Krupa (born 26 April 2003) is a German professional footballer who plays as a forward for Regionalliga Bayern club SpVgg Unterhaching.

== Career ==
On 1 September 2025, Krupa signed a two-year contract with Regionalliga Bayern club SpVgg Unterhaching.
