= René Vollath =

German footballer (born 1990)

Personal information
- Date of birth: 20 March 1990 (age 36)
- Place of birth: Amberg, West Germany
- Height: 1.85 m (6 ft 1 in)
- Position: Goalkeeper

Team information
- Current team: 1860 Munich
- Number: 11

Youth career
- FC Linde Schwandorf
- –2005: 1. FC Schwarzenfeld
- 2005–2008: 1. FC Nürnberg
- 2008–2009: 1899 Hoffenheim

Senior career*
| Years | Team | Apps | (Gls) |
| 2009–2010 | 1899 Hoffenheim II | 5 | (0) |
| 2010–2013 | Wacker Burghausen | 110 | (0) |
| 2013–2017 | Karlsruher SC | 38 | (0) |
| 2014–2017 | Karlsruher SC II | 5 | (0) |
| 2017–2020 | KFC Uerdingen 05 | 70 | (0) |
| 2020–2022 | Türkgücü München | 59 | (0) |
| 2022–2024 | SpVgg Unterhaching | 71 | (0) |
| 2024– | 1860 Munich | 15 | (0) |

International career
| 2005–2006 | Germany U16 | 5 | (0) |
| 2007 | Germany U17 | 5 | (0) |
| 2007 | Germany U18 | 1 | (0) |
| 2008 | Germany U19 | 0 | (0) |
| 2009 | Germany U20 | 3 | (0) |

Managerial career
- 2025–: 1860 Munich (Goalkeeper coach)
- * Club domestic league appearances and goals as of 28 May 2026

René Vollath (born 20 March 1990) is a German professional footballer who plays as a goalkeeper for club 1860 Munich. Vollath was a youth international for Germany.

== Club career ==
On 16 July 2024, Vollath signed with 1860 Munich.

== Coaching career ==
On 9 October 2025, when 1860 Munich announced Markus Kauczinski as their new permanent Head Coach, Vollath was also announced as their new goalkeeping coach.

== Honours ==
KFC Uerdingen 05

- Regionalliga West: 2017–18
- Lower Rhine Cup: 2018–19

Türkgücü München

- Bavarian Cup: 2020–21

SpVgg Unterhaching

- Regionalliga Bayern: 2022–23
