= Maximilian Wolfram =

German footballer

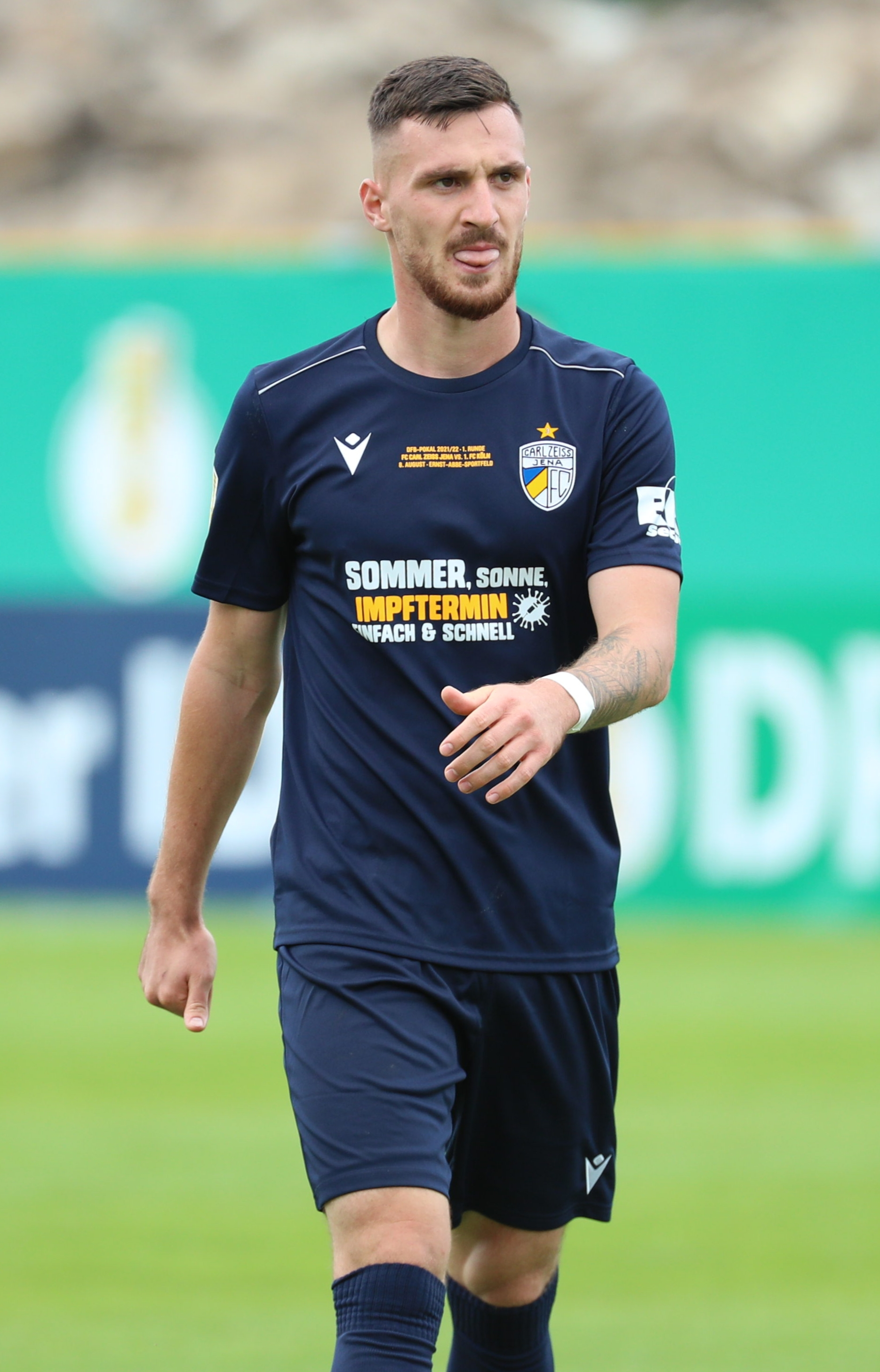
- Maximilian Wolfram (2021)

Personal information
- Date of birth: 21 February 1997 (age 29)
- Place of birth: Zwickau, Germany
- Height: 1.84 m (6 ft 0 in)
- Position: Winger

Team information
- Current team: Kickers Offenbach
- Number: 8

Youth career
- –2010: FSV Zwickau
- 2010–2016: Carl Zeiss Jena

Senior career*
Years	Team	Apps	(Gls)
2015–2019	Carl Zeiss Jena	104	(19)
2017	Carl Zeiss Jena II	4	(0)
2019–2021	Ingolstadt 04 II	1	(1)
2019–2021	Ingolstadt 04	20	(2)
2020–2021	→ FSV Zwickau (loan)	22	(1)
2021–2022	Carl Zeiss Jena	30	(13)
2022–2024	SC Verl	74	(14)
2024–2026	1860 Munich	55	(9)
2026–	Kickers Offenbach	8	(5)
- * Club domestic league appearances and goals as of 24 September 2026

Maximilian Wolfram (born 21 February 1997) is a German footballer who plays as a winger for Kickers Offenbach.

== Career ==
On 31 May 2019 FC Ingolstadt 04 confirmed, that they had signed Wolfram on a 3-year contract.

For the 2024–25 season, Wolfram moved to 1860 Munich.
