= Patrick Hobsch =

German footballer (born 1994)

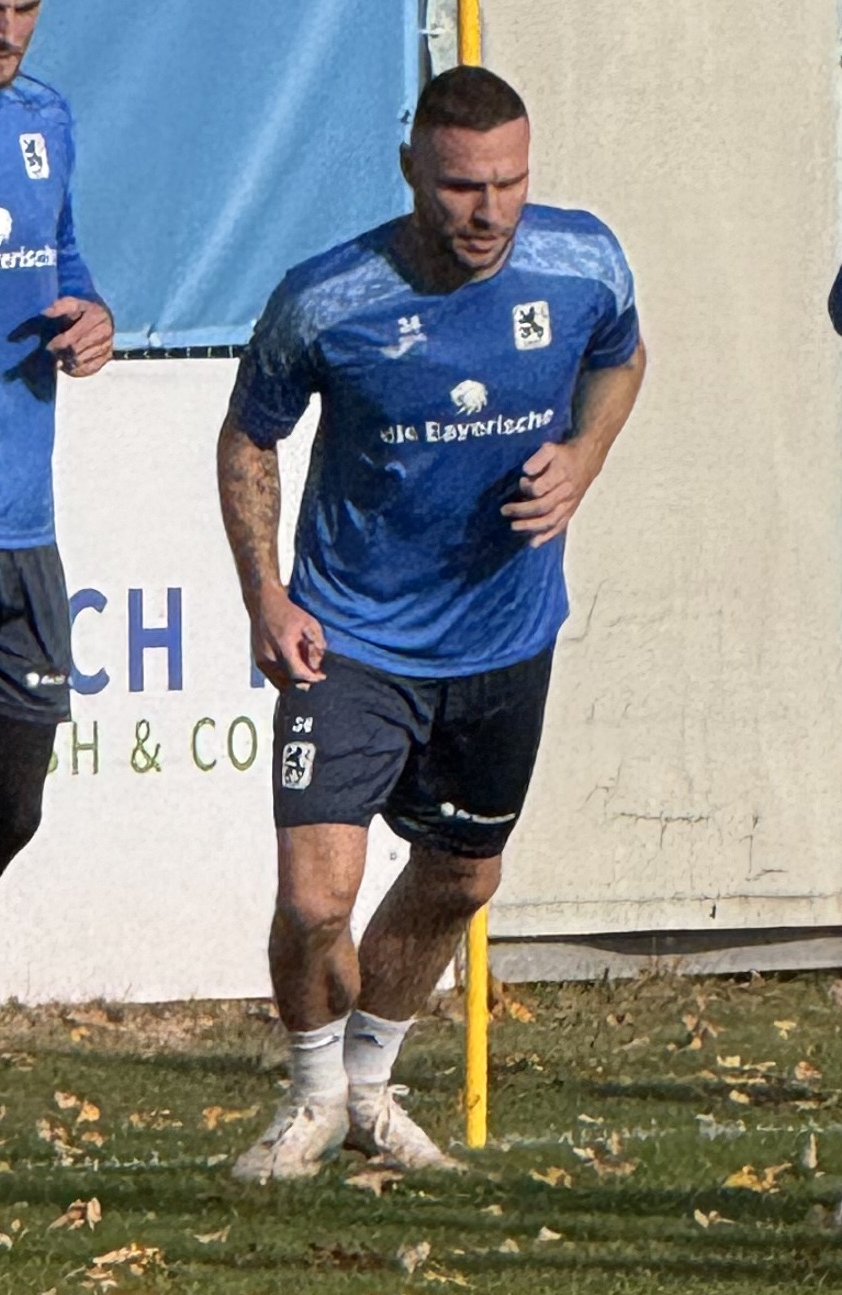
- Hobsch training with 1860 Munich in 2025

Personal information
- Date of birth: 10 October 1994 (age 32)
- Place of birth: Bremen, Germany
- Height: 1.83 m (6 ft 0 in)
- Position: Centre-forward

Team information
- Current team: Jahn Regensburg
- Number: 34

Youth career
- TSV Ochenbruck
- –2011: BSC Woffenbach
- 2011–2012: 1. SC Feucht
- 2012–2013: 1. FC Nürnberg

Senior career*
Years	Team	Apps	(Gls)
2013–2014	1. SC Feucht		
2014–2017	SV Seligenporten	42	(9)
2017–2018	SpVgg Bayreuth	34	(11)
2018–2021	VfB Lübeck	46	(17)
2021–2024	SpVgg Unterhaching	111	(68)
2024–2026	1860 Munich	72	(17)
2026–	Jahn Regensburg	6	(0)
- * Club domestic league appearances and goals as of 14:56, 26 September 2026 (UTC)

Patrick Hobsch (born 10 October 1994) is a German professional footballer who plays as a centre-forward for 3. Liga club Jahn Regensburg.

== Early life ==
Hobsch was born in Bremen; he is the son of former footballer Bernd Hobsch and the family moved several times during Bernd's career before settling in Schwarzenbruck (near Nuremberg).

== Career ==
In June 2021, Hobsch signed for SpVgg Unterhaching of the Regionalliga Bayern on a free transfer.

For the 2024–25 season, Hobsch moved to 1860 Munich in 3. Liga, his father also played for the club.

== Honours ==
SpVgg Unterhaching

- Regionalliga Bayern: 2022–23
