= Benjamin Kanurić =

Austrian association footballer

Personal information
- Date of birth: 26 February 2003 (age 23)
- Place of birth: Enns, Austria
- Height: 1.91 m (6 ft 3 in)
- Position: Midfielder

Team information
- Current team: FC Ingolstadt
- Number: 37

Youth career
- 2009–2011: LASK
- 2011–2012: Red Bull Salzburg
- 2012–2014: Liefering
- 2014–2018: Red Bull Salzburg
- 2018–2019: Deutz 05

Senior career*
Years	Team	Apps	(Gls)
2019–2022	Rapid Wien II	51	(6)
2021–2022	Rapid Wien	2	(0)
2022–2023	Arminia Bielefeld	10	(1)
2023–2025	FC Ingolstadt	71	(14)
2025–2026	Leixões	15	(3)
2026–	FC Ingolstadt	0	(0)

International career^{‡}
2018	Austria U15	3	(0)
2019	Austria U16	2	(0)
2019	Austria U17	6	(2)
2021	Austria U18	1	(0)
2021–2022	Austria U19	8	(2)
2022–2023	Austria U21	5	(1)
- * Club domestic league appearances and goals as of 19 June 2026 ‡ National team caps and goals as of 27 March 2023

Benjamin Kanurić (born 26 February 2003) is an Austrian professional footballer who plays as a midfielder for German 3. Liga club FC Ingolstadt.

== Club career ==
Kanurić is a youth product of LASK, Red Bull Salzburg, Liefering and Deutz 05. He moved to Rapid Wien in 2019 and began his professional career with their reserves in 2020, signing a professional contract with them. He debuted for their senior team in a 1–1 Austrian Bundesliga tie with LASK on 31 July 2021.

Kanurić joined German club Arminia Bielefeld, newly relegated to the 2. Bundesliga, in July 2022.

On 29 June 2023, Kanurić joined FC Ingolstadt in German 3. Liga. On 17 July 2025, Ingolstadt announced Kanurić's transfer to Leixões in Portugal.

On 16 July 2026, Kanurić returned to FC Ingolstadt.

== International career ==
Kanurić was born in Austria and is of Bosnian descent. He is a youth international for Austria, having represented them from all levels from U15 to U19.
