= Simon Skarlatidis =

German footballer (born 1991)

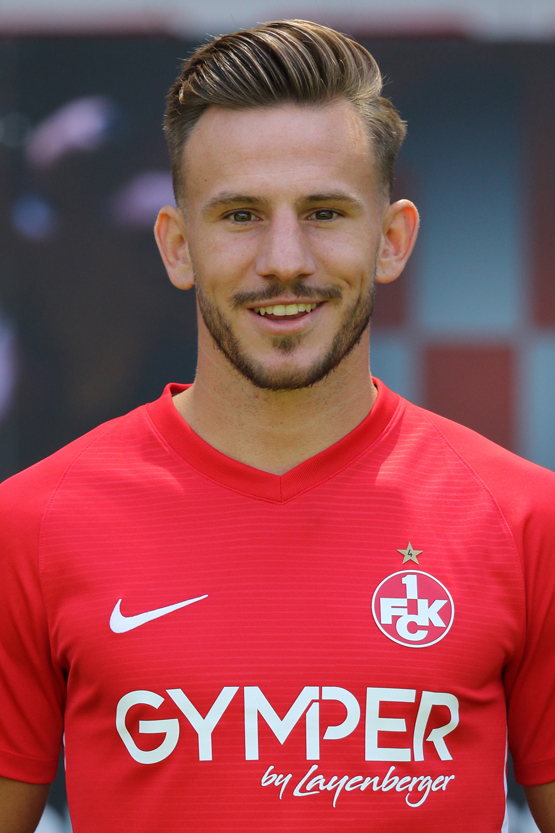
- Skarlatidis with 1. FC Kaiserslautern in 2019

Personal information
- Date of birth: 6 June 1991 (age 35)
- Place of birth: Waiblingen, Germany
- Height: 1.73 m (5 ft 8 in)
- Positions: Winger; attacking midfielder

Team information
- Current team: Erzgebirge Aue
- Number: 30

Youth career
- 1996–2004: VfB Stuttgart
- 2004–2007: SV Fellbach
- 2007–2009: TSG Backnang

Senior career*
Years	Team	Apps	(Gls)
2009–2015	Sonnenhof Großaspach	124	(16)
2015–2017	Erzgebirge Aue	47	(6)
2017–2019	Würzburger Kickers	64	(13)
2019–2021	1. FC Kaiserslautern	29	(3)
2021–2026	SpVgg Unterhaching	158	(27)
2026–	Erzgebirge Aue	10	(1)
- * Club domestic league appearances and goals as of 23 September 2026

Simon Skarlatidis (born 6 June 1991) is a German professional footballer who plays as a winger and attacking midfielder for Erzgebirge Aue.

== Career ==
Skarlatidis played youth football for VfB Stuttgart, SV Fellbach, TSG Backnang and Sonnenhof Großaspach. With Backnang, he was part of the team that lost to Stuttgarter Kickers in the 2009 Württemberg Cup for U19 teams. Shortly thereafter, he moved to Sonnenhof Großaspach where he played in the Regionalliga Südwest. In 2014, the club won the Regionalliga Südwest and was promoted to the 3. Liga after beating VfL Wolfsburg II in two play-off games.

In 2015, after six years with the club, Skarlatidis moved to Erzgebirge Aue, which had just suffered relegation from the 2. Bundesliga. In the 2015–16 season, Skarlatidis was promoted directly back to the 2. Bundesliga with the club. In the following season, 2016–17, he made eleven appearances until February 2017, scoring two goals. In the league game against Dynamo Dresden on 26 February 2017, Skarlatidis suffered a metacarpal fracture and missed the remainder of the season. His contract, which expired in 2017, was not renewed.

On 15 June 2017, Skarlatidis joined Würzburger Kickers on a two-year contract.

After two seasons with Würzburger Kickers, he signed with 1. FC Kaiserslautern on a two-year deal on 29 May 2019. In May 2021, Skarlatidis announced that he had not received a new contract with the club, which meant that he would become a free agent after the 2020–21 season.

Skarlatidis moved to SpVgg Unterhaching on 17 May 2021, competing in the Regionalliga Bayern.

== Personal life ==
Skarlatidis was born to a Greek father and German mother.

== Honours ==
SpVgg Unterhaching

- Regionalliga Bayern: 2022–23
