= Lukas Fröde =

German footballer

Personal information
- Date of birth: 23 January 1995 (age 31)
- Place of birth: Fulda, Germany
- Height: 1.92 m (6 ft 4 in)
- Position: Defensive midfielder

Team information
- Current team: FC Ingolstadt 04
- Number: 34

Youth career
- 1999–2000: TSV Neuenberg
- 2000–2003: SC Borussia 04 Fulda
- 2003–2007: Haimbacher SV
- 2007–2009: Carl Zeiss Jena
- 2009–2014: Werder Bremen

Senior career*
| Years | Team | Apps | (Gls) |
| 2013–2016 | Werder Bremen II | 64 | (4) |
| 2015–2016 | Werder Bremen | 12 | (0) |
| 2017 | Würzburger Kickers | 13 | (1) |
| 2017–2019 | MSV Duisburg | 56 | (3) |
| 2019–2022 | Karlsruher SC | 49 | (1) |
| 2021–2022 | → Hansa Rostock (loan) | 25 | (2) |
| 2022–2023 | Hansa Rostock | 32 | (5) |
| 2023– | FC Ingolstadt 04 | 91 | (6) |

International career
| 2010–2011 | Germany U16 | 6 | (1) |
| 2011–2012 | Germany U17 | 7 | (0) |
| 2012 | Germany U18 | 2 | (0) |
- * Club domestic league appearances and goals as of 29 May 2026

Lukas Fröde (born 23 January 1995) is a German professional footballer who plays as a defensive midfielder for 3. Liga club FC Ingolstadt 04.

== Club career ==
=== Werder Bremen ===
Fröde joined Werder Bremen in 2009 from Carl Zeiss Jena. He made his first-team debut for Werder Bremen at the end of 2015–16 season, on 10 May 2015, against Eintracht Frankfurt being introduced in the 90th minute.

His next first-team appearance came on 28 October 2015, in the 81st minute of Werder's 1–0 second-round DFB-Pokal victory over 1. FC Köln.

=== Würzburger Kickers ===
On 2 January 2017, Fröde signed for 2. Bundesliga side Würzburger Kickers. Würzburg paid a reported transfer fee of €200,000 for Fröde who had half a year left on his contract at Werder Bremen.

=== MSV Duisburg ===
Fröde moved to MSV Duisburg for the 2017–18 season signing a two-year contract with the club newly promoted to the 2. Bundesliga. He signed a contract extension, until 2020, on 13 July 2018.

=== Karlsruher SC ===
For the 2019–20 season, he moved to Karlsruher SC.

=== Hansa Rostock ===
Fröde was loaned to Hansa Rostock for the 2021–22 season, the transfer was made permanent for the 2022–23 season.

=== FC Ingolstadt 04 ===
On 14 June 2023, Fröde signed for FC Ingolstadt 04.

== International career ==
Fröde was a youth international for Germany.
