= 2017–18 SC Fortuna Köln season =

Fortuna Köln
2017–18 season
- Chairman: Hanns-Jörg Westendorf
- Manager: Uwe Koschinat
- Stadium: Südstadion
- 3. Liga: 8th
- Middle Rhine Cup: Semifinals
- All statistics correct as of 28 January 2018.

The 2017–18 SC Fortuna Köln season was the 70th season in the football club's history. The season covers a period from 1 July 2017 to 30 June 2018.

== Players ==
=== Squad information ===
As of 29 April 2018

Note: Flags indicate national team as defined under FIFA eligibility rules; some limited exceptions apply. Players may hold more than one non-FIFA nationality.

No.	Pos.	Nation	Player
1	GK	GER	Tim Boss
2	DF	GER	Dominik Ernst
3	DF	GER	Bernard Kyere
4	DF	MOZ	Boné Uaferro
5	MF	GER	Markus Pazurek
6	MF	TUR	Okan Kurt
7	MF	GER	Michael Kessel
8	FW	GER	Maurice Exslager
9	FW	GER	Daniel Keita-Ruel
14	DF	GER	Cimo Röcker
15	MF	GER	Christopher Theisen
17	DF	GER	Alem Koljić
18	MF	GER	Thomas Bröker
19	MF	GER	Aaron Eichhorn

No.	Pos.	Nation	Player
20	MF	GER	Robin Scheu
21	GK	GER	Jannik Bruhns
22	MF	GER	Christoph Menz
23	MF	GER	Moritz Fritz
28	MF	GER	Lars Bender
29	MF	GER	Ali Ceylan
30	MF	GER	Hamdi Dahmani (captain)
31	MF	GER	Nico Brandenburger
33	GK	GER	André Poggenborg
34	MF	BEL	Kristoffer Andersen
37	MF	GER	Manuel Farrona-Pulido
38	FW	GER	Kai Burger
39	MF	GER	Maik Kegel

== Friendly matches ==
Win Draw Loss

23 June 2017	TSV Steinbach	0–2	Fortuna Köln
18:00		Summary

27 June 2017	Alemannia Aachen	0–1	Fortuna Köln
16:00		Summary

1 July 2017	Fortuna Köln	0–1	KFC Uerdingen 05
16:00		Summary

8 July 2017	Fortuna Köln	6–1	Bayern Kickers
15:00		Summary

11 July 2017	Fortuna Köln	1–1	1. FC Saarbrücken
18:30		Summary

16 July 2017	Borussia Mönchengladbach II	2–0	Fortuna Köln
14:00		Summary

5 October 2017	Bayer Leverkusen	4–0	Fortuna Köln	Leverkusen
15:00		Summary		Stadium: BayArena

8 November 2017	Fortuna Düsseldorf	1–3	Fortuna Köln
16:00		Summary

== Competitions ==
Win Draw Loss

=== 3. Liga ===
==== League table ====
Pos	Team	Pld	W	D	L	GF	GA	GD	Pts
6	Hansa Rostock	38	16	12	10	48	34	+14	60
7	SV Meppen	38	15	13	10	50	47	+3	58
8	Fortuna Köln	38	15	9	14	53	48	+5	54
9	SpVgg Unterhaching	38	16	6	16	54	55	−1	54
10	Preußen Münster	38	14	10	14	50	49	+1	52

Source: DFB
Rules for classification: 1) Points; 2) Goal difference; 3) Goals scored

==== Results summary ====
Overall								Home						Away					
Pld	W	D	L	GF	GA	GD	Pts	W	D	L	GF	GA	GD	W	D	L	GF	GA	GD
21	10	6	5	34	25	+9	36	6	2	2	16	8	+8	4	4	3	18	17	+1

Last updated: 20 January 2018.

==== Results by round ====
Matchday	1	2	3	4	5	6	7	8	9	10	11	12	13	14	15	16	17	18	19	20	21	22	23	24	25	26	27	28	29	30	31	32	33	34	35	36	37	38
Ground	H	A	H	A	H	A	A	H	A	H	A	H	A	H	A	H	A	H	A	A	H	A																
Result	W	W	W	D	W	D	W	D	W	L	W	W	L	W	D	L	L	D	L	D	W																	
Position	3	3	3	3	3	3	3	3	3	3	3	3	3	2	2	4	4	4	4	4	4																	

Updated to match(es) played on 20 January 2018. Source:
A = Away; H = Home; W = Win; D = Draw; L = Loss

==== Matches ====
22 July 2017 Match 1	Fortuna Köln	1–0	Aalen	Cologne
14:00	Farrona-Pulido (yellow card) 37'; Geyer 68' (o.g.); Scheu (yellow card) 89'	Report	Morys (yellow card) 20'; Müller (yellow card) 75'	Stadium: Südstadion; Attendance: 1,962; Referee: (Germany) Benjamin Cortus

29 July 2017 Match 2	Carl Zeiss Jena	0–2	Fortuna Köln	Jena
14:00	Cros (yellow card) 90+2'	Report	Bender (yellow card) 43'; Dahmani 47' 55'; Mimbala (yellow card) 52'; Kurt (yellow card) 83'	Stadium: Ernst-Abbe-Sportfeld; Attendance: 5,103; Referee: (Germany) Martin Petersen

2 August 2017 Match 3	Fortuna Köln	3–0	Osnabrück	Cologne
19:00	Farrona-Pulido 42'; Scheu 48'; Ernst (yellow card) 62'; Pazurek 70' (yellow card) 71'	Report	Groß (yellow card) 75'	Stadium: Südstadion; Attendance: 3,423; Referee: (Germany) Felix Schwermer

5 August 2017 Match 4	Unterhaching	2–2	Fortuna Köln	Unterhaching
14:00	Ulrich Taffertshofer (yellow card) 41'; Schimmer 67'; Hain 69'; Winkler (yellow card) 85'	Report	Ernst (yellow card) 38'; Brandenburger (yellow card) 43'; Keita-Ruel 45' (yellow card) 60'; Kurt 65' (yellow card) 84'	Stadium: Sportpark Unterhaching; Attendance: 3,500; Referee: (Germany) Pascal Müller

18 August 2017 Match 5	Fortuna Köln	4–0	Karlsruher SC	Cologne
19:00	Bülow 11' (o.g.); Kyere 33'; Scheu 50'; Bender 89'; Brandenburger (yellow card) 90'	Report	Bülow (yellow card) 32'; Çamoğlu (yellow card) 37'; Lorenz (yellow card) 41'; Schleusener (yellow card) 58'	Stadium: Südstadion; Attendance: 3,886; Referee: (Germany) Asmir Osmanagic

26 August 2017 Match 6	SV Wehen Wiesbaden	1–1	Fortuna Köln	Wiesbaden
14:00	Andrich (yellow card) 63'; Ruprecht 89' (pen.)	Report	Scheu (yellow card) 17'; Keita-Ruel 56'; Kurt (yellow card) 61'; Kegel (yellow card) 85'	Stadium: Brita-Arena; Attendance: 1,979; Referee: (Germany) Eric Müller

8 September 2017 Match 7	Werder Bremen II	1–2	Fortuna Köln	Bremen
19:00	Manneh 32' (yellow card) 87'	Report	Keita-Ruel 17'; Brandenburger (yellow card) 56' (goal) 81'; Ernst (yellow card) 63' (yellow-red card)	Stadium: Weserstadion Platz 11; Attendance: 803; Referee: (Germany) Franz Bokop

16 September 2017 Match 8	Fortuna Köln	1–1	Hallescher FC	Cologne
14:00	Brandenburger 10' (yellow card) 50'; Keita-Ruel (yellow card) 47'; Bender (yellow card) 48'; Dahmani (yellow card) 71'	Report	Hilal El-Helwe 5'; Barnofsky (yellow card) 9'; Kleineheismann (yellow card) 65'; Bohl (yellow card) 77'; Ludwig (yellow card) 86'; Baumgärtel (yellow card) 90'	Stadium: Südstadion; Attendance: 2,879; Referee: (Germany) Steffen Mix

20 September 2017 Match 9	Chemnitzer FC	1–2	Fortuna Köln	Chemnitz
19:00	Hansch (yellow card) 27'; Mlynikowski (yellow card) 35'; Frahn 49'; Trinks (yellow card) 82'	Report	Röcker (yellow card) 24'; Dahmani 28'; Ernst (yellow card) 39' (yellow-red card); Keita-Ruel (yellow card) 42'; Brandenburger (yellow card) 43'; Farrona-Pulido 53'; Kyere (yellow card) 90+3'	Stadium: community4you ARENA; Attendance: 5,493; Referee: (Germany) Marcel Schütz

23 September 2017 Match 10	Fortuna Köln	0–3	Sportfreunde Lotte	Cologne
14:00	Scheu (yellow card) 67'	Report	Heyer (yellow card) 37'; Piossek 44'; Dej (yellow card) 48' (goal) 49'; Al Ghaddioui 82'	Stadium: Südstadion; Attendance: 1,928; Referee: (Germany) Florian Kornblum

30 September 2017 Match 11	Sonnenhof Großaspach	1–3	Fortuna Köln	Aspach
14:00	Röttger 6'; Rodríguez (yellow card) 81'	Report	Dahmani 20' (yellow card) 69'; Kegel (yellow card) 28'; Ernst (yellow card) 45'; Leist 54' (o.g.); Moritz Fritz (yellow card) 65'; Bender 87'	Stadium: Mechatronik Arena; Attendance: 1,200; Referee: (Germany) Henry Müller

13 October 2017 Match 12	Fortuna Köln	2–0	RW Erfurt	Cologne
19:00	Moritz Fritz (yellow card) 53'; Keita-Ruel 74'; Kyere (yellow card) 77'; Dahmani 87'	Report	Biankadi (yellow card) 47'; Bieber (yellow card) 61' (yellow-red card); Klewin (yellow card) 87'	Stadium: Südstadion; Attendance: 2,403; Referee: (Germany) Asmir Osmanagic

21 October 2017 Match 13	SV Meppen	1–0	Fortuna Köln	Meppen
14:00	Granatowski (yellow card) 22'; Leugers 48' (pen.) (yellow card) 70'; Vržogić (yellow card) 51'	Report	Ernst (yellow card) 30'; Falahen (yellow card) 84'	Stadium: Hänsch-Arena; Attendance: 6,351; Referee: (Germany) Justus Zorn

28 October 2017 Match 14	Fortuna Köln	2–1	Würzburger Kickers	Cologne
14:00	Keita-Ruel 55'; Pazurek 58' (pen.); Mimbala (yellow card) 79'; Scheu (yellow card) 89'	Report	Königs 2'; Nikolaou (yellow card) 72'; Müller (yellow card) 83'	Stadium: Südstadion; Attendance: 1,774; Referee: (Germany) Alexander Sather

3 November 2017 Match 15	Preußen Münster	1–1	Fortuna Köln	Münster
19:00	Kobylański 15' (pen.); Tritz (yellow card) 33'; Scherder (yellow card) 68' (yellow-red card); Rühle (yellow card) 79'; Hoffmann (yellow card) 90'	Report	Keita-Ruel 39'; Kurt (yellow card) 69'	Stadium: Preußenstadion; Attendance: 7,066; Referee: (Germany) Steffen Brütting

18 November 2017 Match 16	Fortuna Köln	1–2	1. FC Magdeburg	Cologne
14:00	Keita-Ruel 44' (pen.); Kessel (yellow card) 65'; Kegel (yellow card) 90+1'	Report	Rother (yellow card) 12'; Niemeyer 17'; Hammann (yellow card) 43'; Düker 64'	Stadium: Südstadion; Attendance: 4,706; Referee: (Germany) Bibiana Steinhaus

25 November 2017 Match 17	Hansa Rostock	5–3	Fortuna Köln	Rostock
14:00	Hilßner 21' (yellow card) 46' (goal) 62' 77'; Benyamina 28'; Alibaz 65'	Report	Kessel 1' (yellow card) 55'; Dahmani 13' (yellow card) 71' (goal) 73'; Pazurek (yellow card) 38' (yellow-red card)	Stadium: Ostseestadion; Attendance: 9,900; Referee: (Germany) Henry Müller

2 December 2017 Match 18	Fortuna Köln	1–1	Zwickau	Cologne
14:00	Kegel (yellow card) 28'; Scheu 36' (yellow card) 45'	Report	Wachsmuth (yellow card) 12'; Frick (yellow card) 32'; Bahn (yellow card) 37'; Antonitsch (yellow card) 57'; Wagner (yellow card) 71'; Eisele 89'	Stadium: Südstadion; Attendance: 1,405; Referee: (Germany) Tim Skorczyk

9 December 2017 Match 19	Paderborn	3–1	Fortuna Köln	Paderborn
14:00	Zolinski 28'; Krauße (yellow card) 32'; Wassey 43' (pen.); Srbeny 54'	Report	Boeder 30' (o.g.)	Stadium: Benteler-Arena; Attendance: 7,762; Referee: (Germany) Bibiana Steinhaus

15 December 2017 Match 20	Aalen	1–1	Fortuna Köln	Aalen
19:00	Morys 13'; Bär (yellow card) 67'; Welzmüller (yellow card) 88'	Report	Boss (yellow card) 39'; Pazurek (yellow card) 45'; Brandenburger (yellow card) 46'; Keita-Ruel 89'	Stadium: OSTALB ARENA; Attendance: 2,893; Referee: (Germany) Felix Schwermer

20 January 2018 Match 21	Fortuna Köln	1–0	Carl Zeiss Jena	Cologne
14:00	Scheu (yellow card) 34'; Brandenburger 61' (yellow card) 76'; Kyere (yellow card) 87'; Kessel (yellow card) 90'	Report	Eismann (yellow card) 30'	Stadium: Südstadion; Attendance: 1,935; Referee: (Germany) Eric Müller

27 January 2018 Match 22	Osnabrück	2–2	Fortuna Köln	Osnabrück
14:00	Danneberg 42'; Groß (yellow card) 43'; Reimerink 75'	Report	Dahmani 1'; Keita-Ruel 9'; Kyere (yellow card) 25'; Farrona-Pulido (yellow card) 34'; Ernst (yellow card) 78'; Boss (yellow card) 83'	Stadium: Stadion an der Bremer Brücke; Attendance: 6,278; Referee: (Germany) Martin Thomsen

3 February 2018 Match 23	Fortuna Köln	0–0	SpVgg Unterhaching	Cologne
14:00		Report		Stadium: Südstadion; Attendance: 1,904

10 February 2018 Match 24	Karlsruher SC	1–0	Fortuna Köln	Karlsruhe
14:00				Stadium: Wildparkstadion

17 February 2018 Match 25	Fortuna Köln	1–0	Wehen Wiesbaden	Cologne
				Stadium: Südstadion

23 February 2018 Match 26	Fortuna Köln	2–1	Werder Bremen II	Cologne
				Stadium: Südstadion

4 March 2018 Match 27	Hallescher FC	0–3	Fortuna Köln	Halle (Saale)
				Stadium: Erdgas Sportpark

7 March 2018 Match 28	Fortuna Köln	3–0	Chemnitzer FC	Cologne
				Stadium: Südstadion

10 March 2018 Match 29	Sportfreunde Lotte	0–2	Fortuna Köln	Lotte
				Stadium: Frimo Stadion

16 March 2018 Match 30	Fortuna Köln	1–3	Sonnenhof Großaspach	Cologne
				Stadium: Südstadion

24 March 2018 Match 31	RW Erfurt	2–1	Fortuna Köln	Erfurt
				Stadium: Steigerwaldstadion

31 March 2018 Match 32	Fortuna Köln	0–2	Meppen	Cologne
				Stadium: Südstadion

7 April 2018 Match 33	Würzburger Kickers	0–1	Fortuna Köln	Würzburg
				Stadium: flyeralarm Arena

14 April 2018 Match 34	Fortuna Köln	2–4	Preußen Münster	Cologne
				Stadium: Südstadion

21 April 2018 Match 35	1. FC Magdeburg	2–0	Fortuna Köln	Magdeburg
				Stadium: MDCC-Arena

28 April 2018 Match 36	Fortuna Köln	0–0	Hansa Rostock	Cologne
				Stadium: Südstadion

5 May 2018 Match 37	Zwickau	1–0	Fortuna Köln	Zwickau
				Stadium: Stadion Zwickau

12 May 2018 Match 38	Fortuna Köln	2–4	Paderborn	Cologne
				Stadium: Südstadion

=== Middle Rhine Cup ===
10 January 2018 Last 16	Marialinden	0–1	Fortuna Köln	Overath
		Report		Stadium: Marialinden Kunstrasen

27 March 2018 Quarter Final	Borussia Freialdenhoven	1–2	Fortuna Köln	Aldenhoven
19:30		Report		Stadium: Ederener Str. / Am Sportplatz

8 May 2018 Semifinal	Viktoria Köln	3–0 (a.e.t.)	Fortuna Köln	Overath
19:00				Attendance: 4,386
