= 2021–22 SV Sandhausen season =

SV Sandhausen
2021–22 season
- Manager: Stefan Kulovits, Gerhard Kleppinger (joint, until 21 September); Alois Schwartz (from 22 September)
- Stadium: BWT-Stadion am Hardtwald
- 2. Bundesliga: 14th
- DFB-Pokal: First round

The 2021–22 season was SV Sandhausen's 106th season in existence and the club's 10th consecutive season in the 2. Bundesliga, the second tier of German football. The club finished 14th in the 2. Bundesliga The club also participated in the DFB-Pokal, in which they were eliminated in the first round.

== Background and pre-season ==
Sanshausen finished the 2020–21 season in 15th place, one point above the relegation play-off place and three points above automatic relegation. Joint managers Stefan Kulovits and Gerhard Kleppinger, who were appointed on 15 February after the dismissal of Michael Schiele, signed a contract with the club for the new season in May 2021.

== Season summary ==
The club were managed jointly by Stefan Kulovits and Gerhard Kleppinger, but they were dismissed on 21 September, and replaced by Alois Schwartz the following day.

== Friendly matches ==
Friendly match details
Date	Time	Opponent	Venue	Result F–A	Scorers	Attendance	Ref.

== Competitions ==
=== 2. Bundesliga ===
==== League table ====
Pos	Team	Pld	W	D	L	GF	GA	GD	Pts	Promotion, qualification or relegation
12	Karlsruher SC	34	9	14	11	54	55	−1	41	
13	Hansa Rostock	34	10	11	13	41	52	−11	41	
14	SV Sandhausen	34	10	11	13	42	54	−12	41	
15	Jahn Regensburg	34	10	10	14	50	51	−1	40	
16	Dynamo Dresden (R)	34	7	11	16	33	46	−13	32	Qualification for relegation play-offs

Source: DFB
Rules for classification: 1) Points; 2) Goal difference; 3) Goals scored; 4) Head-to-head points; 5) Head-to-head goal difference; 6) Head-to-head away goals scored; 7) Away goals scored; 8) Play-off.
(R) Relegated

==== Matches ====
2. Bundesliga match details
Match	Date	Time	Opponent	Venue	Result F–A	Scorers	Attendance	League position	Ref.
1	25 July 2021	13:30	Fortuna Düsseldorf	Home	0–2	—	3,452	15th	
2	31 July 2021	13:30	Jahn Regensburg	Away	0–3	—	5,018	16th	
3	14 August 2021	13:30	Karlsruher SC	Home	0–0	—	4,908	16th	
4	22 August 2021	13:30	Erzgebirge Aue	Away	3–1	Esswein 52', Bachmann 82', Soukou 88'	6,600	14th	
5	27 August 2021	18:30	FC Ingolstadt	Home	0–2	—	3,153	14th	
6	11 September 2021	20:30	Hamburger SV	Away	1–2	Bachmann 88'	19,950	16th	
7	18 September 2021	13:30	1. FC Heidenheim	Home	1–3	Testroet 53'	3,081	16th	
8	26 September 2021	13:30	Hannover 96	Away	2–1	Höhn 73', Keita-Ruel 78'	10,900	16th	
9	3 October 2021	13:30	Darmstadt 98	Home	1–6	Esswein 19'	4,457	16th	
10	17 October 2021	13:30	Hansa Rostock	Away	1–1	Sicker 30'	21,200	16th	
11	24 October 2021	13:30	Werder Bremen	Home	2–2	Testroet 29' pen., 84'	7,252	16th	
12	30 October 2021	13:30	Dynamo Dresden	Away	1–0	Testroet 50'	11,144	15th	
14	19 November 2021	18:30	1. FC Nürnberg	Home	1–2	Höhn 66'	4,617	17th	
13	24 November 2021	18:30	FC St. Pauli	Away	1–3	Höhn 67'	23,401	17th	
15	27 November 2021	13:30	Schalke 04	Away	2–5	Ritzmaier 47', Testroet 74'	46,319	17th	
16	4 December 2021	13:30	SC Paderborn	Home	1–1	Ajdini 90+3'	680	17th	
17	11 December 2021	13:30	Holstein Kiel	Away	2–2	Soukou 26', Zhirov 72'	7,879	17th	
18	17 December 2021	18:30	Fortuna Düsseldorf	Away	1–0	Testroet 7'	10,543	16th	
19	16 January 2022	13:30	Jahn Regensburg	Home	0–3	—	500	16th	
21	5 February 2022	13:30	Erzgebirge Aue	Home	2–0	Soukou 45' pen., Kinsombi 69'	3,246	15th	
20	8 February 2022	18:30	Karlsruher SC	Away	2–0	Testroet 45+2', Gondorf 85' o.g.	6,532	15th	
22	13 February 2022	13:30	FC Ingolstadt	Away	0–0	—	4,247	15th	
23	19 February 2022	13:30	Hamburger SV	Home	1–1	Testroet 15'	6,932	16th	
24	27 February 2022	13:30	1. FC Heidenheim	Away	1–1	Soukou 32'	5,961	15th	
25	5 March 2022	13:30	Hannover 96	Home	3–1	Okoroji 7', Franke 19' o.g., Bachmann 81'	3,852	14th	
26	11 March 2022	18:30	Darmstadt 98	Away	1–1	Kutucu 84'	11,300	15th	
27	19 March 2022	13:30	Hansa Rostock	Home	0–1		5,246	15th	
28	3 April 2022	13:30	Werder Bremen	Away	1–1	Testroet 64'	36,000	15th	
29	10 April 2022	13:30	Dynamo Dresden	Home	2–1	Dumic 7', Zenga 48'	6,012	15th	
30	16 April 2022	13:30	FC St. Pauli	Home	1–1	Bachmann 90+1'	7,094	15th	
31	24 April 2022	13:30	1. FC Nürnberg	Away	4–2	Bachmann 5', Trybull 60', 84', Testroet 88'	40,103	14th	
32	29 April 2022	18:30	Schalke 04	Home	1–2	Diekmeyer 83'	12,355	15th	
33	6 May 2022	18:30	SC Paderborn	Away	0–2		7,719	15th	
34	15 May 2022	15:30	Holstein Kiel	Home	3–1	Dumic 8', Bachmann 40', Kinsombi 35'	4,878	14th	

=== DFB-Pokal ===
DFB-Pokal match details
Round	Date	Time	Opponent	Venue	Result F–A	Scorers	Attendance	Ref.
First round	7 August 2021	15:30	RB Leipzig	Home	0–4	—	4,067	

== Transfers ==
=== Transfers in ===
Date	Position	Name	Previous club (Note: Brackets around club names denote the player's contract with that club had expired before he joined SV Sandhausen)	Fee	Ref.
1 July 2021	GK	Patrick Drewes	(VfL Bochum)	Free	
1 July 2021	FW	Christian Kinsombi	(KFC Uerdingen)	Free	
1 July 2021	FW	Cebio Soukou	(Arminia Bielefeld)	Free	

=== Loans in ===
Date	Position	Name	Club	Return	Ref.

=== Transfers out ===
Date	Position	Name	Subsequent club (Note: Brackets around club names denote the player joined that club after his contract with SV Sandhausen expired)	Fee	Ref.
1 July 2021	DF	Diego Contento		Released	
1 July 2021	DF	Sören Dieckmann		Released	
1 July 2021	MF	Besar Halimi		Released	
1 July 2021	GK	Philipp Heerwagen		Released	
1 July 2021	DF	Philipp Klingmann		Released	
1 July 2021	DF	Gerrit Nauber		Released	
1 July 2021	MF	Ivan Paurević		Released	
1 July 2021	DF	Alexander Rossipal		Released	
1 July 2021	MF	Robin Scheu		Released	
1 July 2021	MF	Emanuel Taffertshofer		Released	
1 July 2021	FW	Nikos Zografakis		Released	

=== Loans out ===
Date	Position	Name	Club	Return	Ref.
