= 2020–21 SV Sandhausen season =

SV Sandhausen
2020–21 season
- Chairman: Jürgen Machmeier
- Head coach: Uwe Koschinat
- Stadium: BWT-Stadion am Hardtwald
- 2. Bundesliga: 15th
- DFB-Pokal: Second round
Home colours	Away colours	Third colours

The 2020–21 SV Sandhausen season was the club's 105th season in existence and the club's 9th consecutive season in the second flight of German football. In addition to the domestic league, SV Sandhausen participated in this season's edition of the DFB-Pokal. The season covers the period from 1 July 2020 to 30 June 2021.

== Players ==
=== First-team squad ===
As of 18 August 2020

Note: Flags indicate national team as defined under FIFA eligibility rules; some limited exceptions apply. Players may hold more than one non-FIFA nationality.

No.	Pos.	Nation	Player
1	GK	AUT	Martin Fraisl
2	DF	RUS	Aleksandr Zhirov
3	DF	GER	Diego Contento
5	MF	GER	Marlon Frey
6	MF	GER	Denis Linsmayer
7	MF	GER	Philip Türpitz
8	MF	GER	Mario Engels
9	FW	FRA	Daniel Keita-Ruel
10	FW	GER	Julius Biada
11	FW	MAR	Aziz Bouhaddouz
13	GK	GER	Rick Wulle
14	DF	GER	Tim Kister
15	GK	GER	Philipp Heerwagen
16	FW	GER	Kevin Behrens

No.	Pos.	Nation	Player
17	MF	GER	Erik Zenga
18	DF	GER	Dennis Diekmeier (captain)
19	MF	DEN	Nikolas Nartey
20	MF	GER	Emanuel Taffertshofer
21	MF	VEN	Enrique Peña Zauner
22	DF	GER	Gerrit Nauber
23	DF	GER	Nils Röseler
24	DF	GER	Philipp Klingmann
26	MF	KOS	Besar Halimi
27	MF	GER	Robin Scheu
29	MF	CRO	Ivan Paurević
30	DF	GER	Sören Dieckmann
33	DF	GER	Alexander Rossipal

== Pre-season and friendlies ==
Win Draw Loss Fixtures

8 August 2020 Friendly	VfB Stuttgart	6–1	SV Sandhausen	Stuttgart, Germany
11:00 CEST (UTC+2)	Förster 22'; Castro 33'; Didavi 63'; Stenzel 76'; Endo 84'; González 86'	Report	Behrens 39'	Stadium: Robert-Schlienz-Stadion

15 August 2020 Friendly	SV Sandhausen	3–3	Nancy	Sandhausen, Germany
17:00 CEST (UTC+2)	Engels 37'; Bouhaddouz 65'; Türpitz 118' (pen.)	Report	Biron 35'; Triboulet 50', 69'	Stadium: BWT-Stadion am Hardtwald
Note: Match was played in four 30-minute quarters.

22 August 2020 Friendly	Mainz 05	0–1	SV Sandhausen	Mainz, Germany
14:00 CEST (UTC+2)			Keita-Ruel 40' (pen.)	Stadium: Stadion am Bruchweg
Note: Match was played in two 60-minute halves.

6 September 2020 Friendly	SC Freiburg	1–1	SV Sandhausen	Freiburg, Germany
18:30 CEST (UTC+2)				Stadium: Schwarzwald-Stadion

== Competitions ==
=== 2. Bundesliga ===
==== League table ====
Pos	Team	Pld	W	D	L	GF	GA	GD	Pts	Qualification or relegation
13	Hannover 96	34	12	6	16	53	51	+2	42	
14	Jahn Regensburg	34	9	11	14	37	50	−13	38	
15	SV Sandhausen	34	10	4	20	41	60	−19	34	
16	VfL Osnabrück (R)	34	9	6	19	35	58	−23	33	Qualification for relegation play-offs
17	Eintracht Braunschweig (R)	34	7	10	17	30	59	−29	31	Relegation to 3. Liga

Source: DFB
Rules for classification: 1) Points; 2) Goal difference; 3) Goals scored; 4) Head-to-head points; 5) Head-to-head goal difference; 6) Head-to-head away goals scored; 7) Away goals scored; 8) Play-off.
(R) Relegated

==== Matches ====
2. Bundesliga match details
Match	Date	Time	Opponent	Venue	Result F–A	Scorers	Attendance	League position	Ref.
1	19 September 2020	13:00	SV Darmstadt 98	3–2	Home	Keita-Ruel 30', 38' pen., 74'	754	4th	
2	27 September 2020	13:30	1. FC Nürnberg	0–1	Away		6,505	10th	
3	2 October 2020	18:30	FC St. Pauli	1–0	Home	Buballa 45' o.g.	1,393	4th	
4	17 October 2020	13:00	Karlsruher SC	0–3	Away		1,200	6th	
5	25 October 2020	13:30	SC Paderborn 07	1–1	Home	Scheu 37'	0	8th	
6	31 October 2020	13:00	VfL Osnabrück	1–2	Away	Behrens 61'	0	12th	
7	6 November 2020	18:30	Eintracht Braunschweig	2–2	Home	Esswein 4', Behrens 27'	0	12th	
8	21 November 2020	13:00	Fortuna Düsseldorf	0–1	Away		0	15th	
9	28 November 2020	13:00	Erzgebirge Aue	1–4	Home	Behrens 19' pen.	0	15th	
10	6 December 2020	13:30	Würzburger Kickers	3–2	Away	Keita-Ruel 18', 70', Paurević 54'	0	15th	
11	11 December 2020	18:30	Greuther Fürth	0–3	Home		0	15th	
12	15 December 2020	18:30	Hamburger SV	0–4	Away		0	16th	
13	20 December 2020	13:30	Holstein Kiel	0–2	Home		0	16th	
14	3 January 2021	13:30	Hannover 96	0–4	Away		0	16th	
15	8 January 2021	18:30	1. FC Heidenheim	4–0	Home	Biada 9', Röseler 32', Rossipal 59', Behrens 82'	0	15th	
16	17 January 2021	13:30	Jahn Regensburg	1–3	Away	Keita-Ruel 6'	0	15th	
17	24 January 2021	13:30	VfL Bochum	1–1	Home	Behrens 44'	0	16th	
18	27 January 2021	18:30	SV Darmstadt 98	1–2	Away	Zhirov 1'	0	17th	
19	31 January 2021	13:30	1. FC Nürnberg	2–0	Home	Röseler 43', Keita-Ruel 90+1'	0	16th	
20	5 February 2021	18:30	FC St. Pauli	1–2	Away	Behrens 74'	0	16th	
21	13 February 2021	13:00	Karlsruher SC	2–3	Home	Behrens 30', Schmidt 40'	0	16th	
22	20 February 2021	13:00	SC Paderborn 07	1–2	Away	Halimi 15'	0	17th	
23	28 February 2021	13:30	VfL Osnabrück	3–0	Home	Esswein 6' pen., Behrens 63' pen., Klingmann 88'	0	16th	
24	7 March 2021	13:30	Eintracht Braunschweig	0–1	Away		0	17th	
25	13 March 2021	13:00	Fortuna Düsseldorf	0–0	Home		0	17th	
26	20 March 2021	13:00	Erzgebirge Aue	0–2	Away		0	17th	
27	4 April 2021	13:30	Würzburger Kickers	1–0	Home	Behrens 45' pen.	0	17th	
29	22 April 2021	20:30	Hamburger SV	2–1	Home	Ambrosius 46' o.g., Keita-Ruel 52'	0	17th	
31	25 April 2021	13:30	Hannover 96	4–2	Home	Biada 26', Behrens 68' pen., 90+1', Keita-Ruel 81'	0	15th	
28	28 April 2021	18:30	Greuther Fürth	2–3	Away	Keita-Ruel 36', 52'	0	17th	
30	4 May 2021	18:30	Holstein Kiel	0–2	Away		0	16th	
32	9 May 2021	13:30	1. FC Heidenheim	1–2	Away	Keita-Ruel 43'	0	15th	
33	16 May 2021	15:30	Jahn Regensburg	2–0	Home	Bachmann 5', Behrens 42'	0	15th	
34	23 May 2021	15:30	VfL Bochum	1–3	Away	Behrens 60'	0	15th	

=== DFB-Pokal ===
DFB-Pokal match details
Round	Date	Time	Opponent	Venue	Result F–A	Scorers	Attendance	Ref.
First round	13 September 2020	15:30	TSV Steinbach Haiger	Away	2–1	Biada 23', 45+1'	670	
Second round	23 December 2020	18:30	VfL Wolfsburg	Away	0–4		0	
