= 2022–23 SV Sandhausen season =

SV Sandhausen
2022–23 season
- Chairman: Jürgen Machmeier
- Head coach: Alois Schwartz
- Stadium: BWT-Stadion am Hardtwald
- 2. Bundesliga: 18th (relegated)
- DFB-Pokal: Round of 16

The 2022–23 season was the 107th in the history of SV Sandhausen and their 11th consecutive season in the second division. The club participated in the 2. Bundesliga and DFB-Pokal.

== Players ==
As of 31 January 2023

Note: Flags indicate national team as defined under FIFA eligibility rules; some limited exceptions apply. Players may hold more than one non-FIFA nationality.

No.	Pos.	Nation	Player
1	GK	GER	Patrick Drewes
2	DF	RUS	Aleksandr Zhirov
3	DF	BIH	Dario Đumić
5	MF	GER	Marcel Mehlem (on loan from SC Paderborn)
6	MF	GER	Abu-Bekir El-Zein
8	MF	GER	Christian Kinsombi
9	FW	CZE	Matěj Pulkrab
10	MF	GER	David Kinsombi
11	FW	GER	Philipp Ochs
14	FW	MAR	Hamadi Al Ghaddioui
15	DF	GER	Immanuel Höhn
17	MF	GER	Erik Zenga
18	DF	GER	Dennis Diekmeier (captain)
19	DF	KOS	Bashkim Ajdini
20	MF	GER	Kerim Çalhanoğlu (on loan from FC Schalke 04)

No.	Pos.	Nation	Player
22	MF	AUT	Marcel Ritzmaier
23	FW	TUR	Ahmed Kutucu (on loan from İstanbul Başakşehir)
24	MF	GER	Merveille Papela (on loan from Mainz 05)
25	DF	SEN	Oumar Diakhité
26	MF	GER	Janik Bachmann
27	DF	GER	Arne Sicker
29	FW	SUI	Kemal Ademi (on loan from Khimki)
30	FW	GER	Alexander Esswein
32	DF	GER	Raphael Framberger (on loan from Augsburg)
33	GK	GER	Nikolai Rehnen
36	DF	GER	Chima Okoroji
37	MF	ISR	Joseph Ganda
38	FW	CMR	Franck Evina
40	GK	GER	Benedikt Grawe

=== Out on loan ===
Note: Flags indicate national team as defined under FIFA eligibility rules; some limited exceptions apply. Players may hold more than one non-FIFA nationality.

No.	Pos.	Nation	Player
—	MF	GER	Vincent Schwab (at Eintracht Trier until 30 June 2023)

== Pre-season and friendlies ==
Win Draw Loss

18 June 2022 Friendly	SV Sandhausen (Germany)	10–0	(Germany) TuS Mingolsheim	Bad Schönborn
15:00 CEST (UTC+2)				Stadium: TuS Sportpark

19 June 2022 Friendly	Fortuna Heddesheim (Germany)	0–7	(Germany) SV Sandhausen	Heddesheim
17:00 CEST (UTC+2)				Stadium: Rasenplatz Fortuna Heddesheim NR

30 June 2022 Friendly	SV Sandhausen (Germany)	3–0	(Romania) Sepsi OSK	St. Ulrich am Pillersee, Austria
17:00 CEST (UTC+2)	Trybull 17'; Esswein 71', 100'			Stadium: Sportplatz St. Ulrich

5 July 2022 Friendly	SV Sandhausen (Germany)	3–1	(Germany) FC Astoria Walldorf	Bad Schönborn
18:00 CEST (UTC+2)				Stadium: TuS Sportpark

8 July 2022 Friendly	FC Augsburg (Germany)	1–1	(Germany) SV Sandhausen	Augsburg
17:30 CEST (UTC+2)	Caligiuri 37'		Pulkrab 84'	Stadium: Rasenplatz Zusmarshausen Hauptfeld; Attendance: 2,000

20 November 2022 Friendly	Basel (Switzerland)	0–0	(Germany) SV Sandhausen	Münchenstein, Switzerland
13:30 CET (UTC+1)				Stadium: Nachwuchs-Campus Basel

25 November 2022 Friendly	SV Sandhausen (Germany)	0–0	(Austria) Rheindorf Altach	Eislingen
13:30 CET (UTC+1)				Stadium: Eichenbachstadion

2 December 2022 Friendly	Eintracht Frankfurt (Germany)	5–1	(Germany) SV Sandhausen	Frankfurt
13:30 CET (UTC+1)	Borré 7', 77'; Alario 27'; Tuta 48'; Alidou 49'		Đumić 84'	Stadium: Deutsche Bank Park

14 January 2023 Tipsport Malta Cup	SV Sandhausen (Germany)	3–0	(Slovakia) Spartak Trnava	Malta
16:00 CET (UTC+1)	Çalhanoğlu 2'; Kinsombi 23'; Diakhité 78'	Report	Curma (red card) 52'	Referee: Slobodan Petrovic

17 January 2023 Tipsport Malta Cup	SV Sandhausen (Germany)	v	(Czech Republic) Zlín	Malta
14:00 CET (UTC+1)

== Competitions ==
=== Overall record ===
Competition	First match	Last match	Starting round	Final position	Record							
Competition	First match	Last match	Starting round	Final position	Pld	W	D	L	GF	GA	GD	Win %
2. Bundesliga	16 July 2022	28 May 2023	Matchday 1	18th	34	7	7	20	35	63	−28	20.59
DFB-Pokal	31 July 2022	7 February 2023	First round	Round of 16	3	1	1	1	6	4	+2	33.33
Total					37	8	8	21	41	67	−26	21.62

Source: Soccerway

=== 2. Bundesliga ===
==== League table ====
Pos	Team	Pld	W	D	L	GF	GA	GD	Pts	Promotion, qualification or relegation
14	1. FC Nürnberg	34	10	9	15	32	49	−17	39	
15	Eintracht Braunschweig	34	9	9	16	42	59	−17	36	
16	Arminia Bielefeld (R)	34	9	7	18	50	62	−12	34	Qualification for relegation play-offs
17	Jahn Regensburg (R)	34	8	7	19	34	58	−24	31	Relegation to 3. Liga
18	SV Sandhausen (R)	34	7	7	20	35	63	−28	28	Relegation to 3. Liga

Source: DFB
Rules for classification: 1) Points; 2) Goal difference; 3) Goals scored; 4) Head-to-head results; 5) Head-to-head away goals scored; 6) Away goals scored; 7) Play-off.
(R) Relegated

==== Results summary ====
Overall								Home						Away					
Pld	W	D	L	GF	GA	GD	Pts	W	D	L	GF	GA	GD	W	D	L	GF	GA	GD
3	2	0	1	4	3	+1	6	2	0	0	3	1	+2	0	0	1	1	2	−1

Source: DFB

==== Results by round ====
Round	1	2	3	4
Ground	H	A	H	A
Result	W	L	W	
Position	5	10		

Source: DFB
A = Away; H = Home; W = Win; D = Draw; L = Loss

==== Matches ====
The league fixtures were announced on 17 June 2022.

2. Bundesliga match details
Match	Date	Time	Opponent	Venue	Result F–A	Scorers	Attendance	Ref.
1	16 July 2022	13:00	Arminia Bielefeld	Home	2–1	Kinsombi 11', 63'	4,709	
2	22 July 2022	18:30	Darmstadt 98	Away	1–2	Zhirov 24'	13,620	
3	5 August 2022	18:30	Fortuna Düsseldorf	Home	1–0	Bachmann 46'	4,671	
4	13 August 2022	13:00	Karlsruher SC	Away	2–3	Kinsombi 10', Kutucu 61'	14,778	
5	20 August 2022	13:00	1. FC Nürnberg	Home	1–2	Ajdini 33'	5,701	
6	28 August 2022	13:30	Holstein Kiel	Away	0–1		10,006	
7	4 September 2022	13:30	1. FC Kaiserslautern	Home	0–0		11,378	
8	11 September 2022	13:30	FC St. Pauli	Away	1–1	Kinsombi 71'	29,546	
9	16 September 2022	18:30	Hannover 96	Home	2–3	Kinsombi 56' pen., Ajdini 73'	4,137	
10	1 October 2022	13:00	Greuther Fürth	Away	1–1	Esswein 12'	8,637	
11	9 October 2022	13:30	1. FC Magdeburg	Home	1–0	Kinsombi 74'	5,211	
12	16 October 2022	13:30	SC Paderborn	Away	0–3		9,663	
13	22 October 2022	13:00	Jahn Regensburg	Away	1–2	Esswein 12'	8,123	
14	30 October 2022	13:30	Eintracht Braunschweig	Home	2–2	Bachmann 65', Kinsombi 80'	4,729	
15	4 November 2022	18:30	Hansa Rostock	Away	1–0	Kinsombi 45'	24,500	
16	9 November 2022	18:30	1. FC Heidenheim	Home	3–4	Papela 50', Kinsombi 76', Esswein 80'	3,471	
17	12 November 2022	13:00	Hamburger SV	Away	2–4	Soukou 50', Kinsombi 68'	55,246	
18	29 January 2023	13:30	Arminia Bielefeld	Away	2–1	Kinsombi 13', Esswein 33'	18,300	
19	3 February 2023	18:30	Darmstadt 98	Home	0–4		7,254	
20	12 February 2023	13:30	Fortuna Düsseldorf	Away	0–2		22,125	
21	19 February 2023	13:30	Karlsruher SC	Home	0–3		7,876	
22	25 February 2023	13:00	1. FC Nürnberg	Away	0–1		26,260	
23	4 March 2023	13:00	Holstein Kiel	Home	1–1	Evina 90+5'	3,603	
24	10 March 2023	18:30	1. FC Kaiserslautern	Away	2–2	Kutucu 8', Evina 80'	39,779	
25	19 March 2023	13:30	FC St. Pauli	Home	0–5		7,642	
26	1 April 2023	13:00	Hannover 96	Away	1–3	Kinsombi 14'	22,400	
27	9 April 2023	13:30	Greuther Fürth	Home	0–2		4,951	
28	15 April 2023	13:00	1. FC Magdeburg	Away	2–1	Đumić 25', 66'	23,156	
29	23 April 2023	13:30	SC Paderborn	Home	2–2	Ademi 31', Evina 48'	3,806	
30	30 April 2023	13:30	Jahn Regensburg	Home	2–1	Papela 16', Đumić 52'	5,243	
31	7 May 2023	13:30	Eintracht Braunschweig	Away	1–2	Zhirov 88'	20,000	
32	12 May 2023	18:30	Hansa Rostock	Home	1–2	Bachmann 54'	7,013	
33	20 May 2023	13:00	1. FC Heidenheim	Away	0–1		14,300	
34	28 May 2023	15:30	Hamburger SV	Home	0–1		12,320	

=== DFB-Pokal ===
DFB-Pokal match details
Round	Date	Time	Opponent	Venue	Result F–A	Scorers	Attendance	Ref.
First round	31 July 2022	13:00	Schwarz-Weiß Rehden	Away (Note: Match played at Sportplatz Waldsportstätten, Rehden)	4–0	Bachmann 23', 45', Kutucu 32', Zhirov 51'	1,500	
Second round	19 October 2022	18:00	Karlsruher SC	Home	2–2 (a.e.t.) (6–5 p)	Ambrosius 8' o.g., Zhirov 44'	8,644	
Round of 16	7 February 2023	18:00	SC Freiburg	Home	0–2		11,782	
