= Besar Halimi =

German-born Kosovar footballer (born 1994)

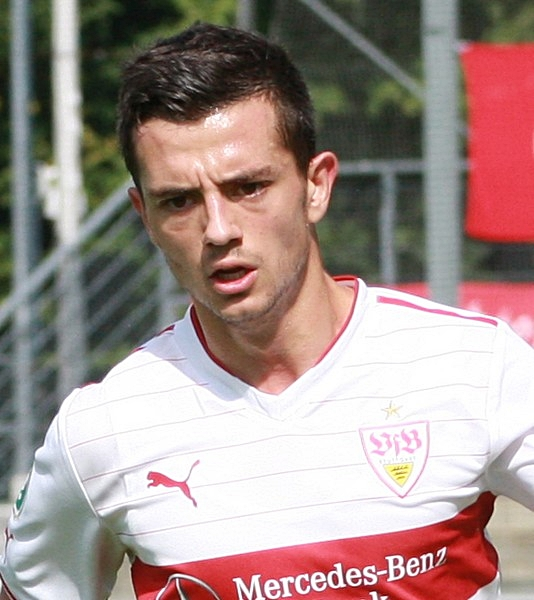
- Halimi with VfB Stuttgart II in 2013

Personal information
- Date of birth: 12 December 1994 (age 31)
- Place of birth: Frankfurt, Germany
- Height: 1.69 m (5 ft 7 in)
- Position: Attacking midfielder

Team information
- Current team: Raja CA
- Number: 30

Youth career
- 1998–2000: VfL Germania 1894
- 2000–2007: Eintracht Frankfurt
- 2007–2009: Darmstadt 98
- 2009–2013: 1. FC Nürnberg

Senior career*
Years	Team	Apps	(Gls)
2012–2013	1. FC Nürnberg II	19	(1)
2013–2014	VfB Stuttgart II	14	(1)
2014–2015	Stuttgarter Kickers	37	(2)
2015–2018	Mainz 05	0	(0)
2015–2016	→ FSV Frankfurt (loan)	26	(4)
2016–2018	→ Mainz 05 II	24	(4)
2017–2018	→ Brøndby (loan)	29	(7)
2018–2019	Brøndby	21	(2)
2019–2021	SV Sandhausen	26	(2)
2021–2022	Riga	6	(1)
2022–2023	Apollon Smyrnis	27	(3)
2023–2024	Hallescher FC	22	(4)
2024–2025	SV Sandhausen	30	(4)
2025–2026	Śląsk Wrocław	17	(0)
2026–	Raja CA	1	(0)

International career
2011	Germany U18	2	(0)
2012	Germany U19	1	(0)
2015–2021	Kosovo	34	(3)
- * Club domestic league appearances and goals as of 03:04, 5 February 2026 (UTC)

Besar Halimi (born 12 December 1994) is a professional footballer who plays as an attacking midfielder for Moroccan club Raja CA. Born in Germany, he plays for the Kosovo national team.

== Club career ==
=== Early career ===
Halimi first played for a local club VfL Germania 1894 and joined the youth academy of Eintracht Frankfurt, when he was six years old. In 2007, he transferred to the youth academy of SV Darmstadt 98, where he played until 2009. Where he went to play in the youth team of 1. FC Nürnberg. In the 2011–12 season, he played two matches in the Regionalliga Süd for 1. FC Nürnberg II. In the following season he played 17 matches in the Regionalliga Bayern for the reserves of Nürnberg, where he scored one goal.

On 12 July 2013, Halimi was signed to the VfB Stuttgart II. On 21 September 2013, he made his professional debut in a 3. Liga match against Rot-Weiß Erfurt and he ended the season with 14 matches and one goal. In order to gain more playing time, Halimi signed with Stuttgarter Kickers for the 2014–15 season. In one season he made two goals in 37 league matches for the Kickers and was chosen as the Player of the Month of 3. Liga for November 2014.

=== Mainz 05 ===
On 12 July 2015, Halimi signed a four-year contract with Bundesliga club Mainz 05, and was immediately loaned out to 2. Bundesliga outfit FSV Frankfurt for the entirety of the 2015–16 season. In the following season, he played for the Mainz 05 II in the 3. Liga.

=== Brøndby ===
For the 2017–18 season. Halimi joined Danish Superliga side Brøndby, on a season-long loan. On 13 July 2017, he made his debut with Brøndby in the 2017–18 UEFA Europa League second qualifying round against the Finnish side VPS after coming on as a substitute at 64th minute in place of Kamil Wilczek.

I really missed my teammates and the club. Never before have I experienced having such a strong bond to a club or any teammates before, as I did in Brøndby last season.

— Halimi on returning to Brøndby IF, August 2018.

On 30 August 2018, Halimi returned and signed a two-year contract with Danish Superliga club Brøndby. Three days later, he made his debut in a 2–2 home draw against Midtjylland after coming on as a substitute at 76th minute in place of Lasse Vigen.

=== SV Sandhausen ===
On 2 September 2019, Halimi signed a two-year contract with 2. Bundesliga club SV Sandhausen. On 21 September, he made his debut in a 1–1 home draw against VfL Bochum after being named in the starting line-up. He scored his first goal for Sandhausen against Holstein Kiel on 22 December, exploiting a poor pass from opposing goalkeeper Dominik Reimann in an eventual 2–2 draw.

On 23 December 2020, in the second round of the DFB-Pokal, Halimi made his cup debut for Sandhausen, coming off the bench at half-time for Julius Biada as they were knocked out 4–0 by VfL Wolfsburg. His first goal of the 2020–21 season came on 20 February 2021, as he struck a volley from the edge of the area off a header from Nils Röseler in a 2–1 loss to SC Paderborn; Sandhausen's third loss in a row.

During his two seasons with Sandhausen, Halimi made 27 total appearances in which he scored two goals, as he failed to become an established starter.

=== Riga ===
On 12 July 2021, Halimi joined Latvian Higher League side Riga. Five days later, he made his debut in a 2–3 away win against Spartaks Jūrmala after coming on as a substitute at 66th minute in place of Felipe Brisola.

On 2 March 2022, Halimi had his contract terminated by mutual consent.

=== Hallescher FC ===
On 26 June 2023, Halimi signed with Hallescher FC in the 3. Liga.

=== Return to SV Sandhausen ===
On 26 June 2024, Halimi re-joined SV Sandhausen, now in the 3. Liga.

=== Śląsk Wrocław ===
On 28 June 2025, Halimi signed a one-year contract, with an option for another year, with Polish I liga club Śląsk Wrocław.

== International career ==
From 2011, until 2012, Halimi has been part of Germany at youth international level, respectively has been part of the U18 and U19 teams and he with these teams played 3 matches. On 7 October 2015, he received a call-up from Kosovo for the friendly match against Equatorial Guinea, and made his debut after being named in the starting line-up.

== Personal life ==
Halimi was born in Frankfurt, Germany to Kosovo Albanian parents from the village Malishevë of Gjilan.

== Career statistics ==
=== Club ===
As of match played 3 December 2025

Appearances and goals by club, season and competition
Club	Season	League			National cup (Note: Includes DFB-Pokal, Danish Cup, Latvian Cup, Greek Cup, Polish Cup)		Continental		Other		Total	
Club	Season	Division	Apps	Goals	Apps	Goals	Apps	Goals	Apps	Goals	Apps	Goals
1. FC Nürnberg II	2011–12	Regionalliga Südwest	2	0	0	0	—		—		2	0
1. FC Nürnberg II	2012–13	Regionalliga Bayern	17	1	0	0	—		—		17	1
1. FC Nürnberg II	Total		19	1	0	0	—		—		19	1
VfB Stuttgart II	2013–14	3. Liga	14	1	0	0	—		—		14	1
Stuttgarter Kickers	2014–15	3. Liga	37	2	1	0	—		2 (Note: Appearances in Württemberg Cup)	0	40	2
Mainz 05	2015–16	Bundesliga	0	0	0	0	—		—		0	0
Mainz 05	2016–17	Bundesliga	0	0	0	0	—		—		0	0
Mainz 05	Total		0	0	0	0	—		—		0	0
FSV Frankfurt (loan)	2015–16	2. Bundesliga	26	4	2	0	—		—		28	4
Mainz 05 II	2016–17	3. Liga	24	4	0	0	—		—		24	4
Brøndby (loan)	2017–18	Danish Superliga	29	7	5	1	4 (Note: Appearances in UEFA Europa League)	0	—		38	8
Brøndby	2018–19	Danish Superliga	20	1	4	2	0	0	1 (Note: Appearance in Danish Superliga UEFA Europa League play-off)	1	24	3
SV Sandhausen	2019–20	2. Bundesliga	14	1	0	0	—		—		14	1
SV Sandhausen	2020–21	2. Bundesliga	12	1	1	0	—		—		13	1
SV Sandhausen	Total		26	2	1	0	—		—		27	2
Riga	2021	Latvian Higher League	6	1	2	0	5 (Note: Appearances in UEFA Europa Conference League)	0	0	0	13	1
Apollon Smyrnis	2022–23	Super League Greece 2	27	3	1	0	—		—		28	3
Hallescher FC	2023–24	3. Liga	22	4	—		—		3 (Note: Appearances in Saxony-Anhalt Cup)	1	25	5
SV Sandhausen	2024–25	3. Liga	30	4	1	1	—		4 (Note: Appearances in Baden Cup)	1	35	6
Śląsk Wrocław	2025–26	I liga	17	0	2	0	—		—		19	0
Career total			297	34	19	4	9	0	10	3	335	41

=== International ===
As of 14 November 2021

Appearances and goals by national team and year
National team	Year	Apps	Goals
Kosovo	2015	2	0
Kosovo	2016	3	0
Kosovo	2017	4	1
Kosovo	2018	6	0
Kosovo	2019	8	0
Kosovo	2020	1	0
Kosovo	2021	10	2
Total		34	3

As of 31 March 2021
Scores and results list Kosovo's goal tally first, score column indicates score after each Halimi goal.

List of international goals scored by Besar Halimi
No.	Date	Venue	Opponent	Score	Result	Competition	Ref.
1	13 November 2017	Adem Jashari Olympic Stadium, Mitrovica, Kosovo	Latvia	4–3	4–3	Friendly	
2	24 March 2021	Fadil Vokrri Stadium, Pristina, Kosovo	Lithuania	4–0	4–0	Friendly	
3	31 March 2021	Estadio de La Cartuja, Seville, Spain	Spain	1–2	1–3	2022 FIFA World Cup qualification	

== Honours ==
Brøndby

- Danish Cup: 2017–18
