= Ajdini =

Ajdini is a surname. Notable people with the surname include:

- Bashkim Ajdini (born 1992), Kosovar Albanian footballer
- Alban Ajdini (born 1999), Kosovar Albanian footballer
