= Tim Boss =

German footballer (born 1993)

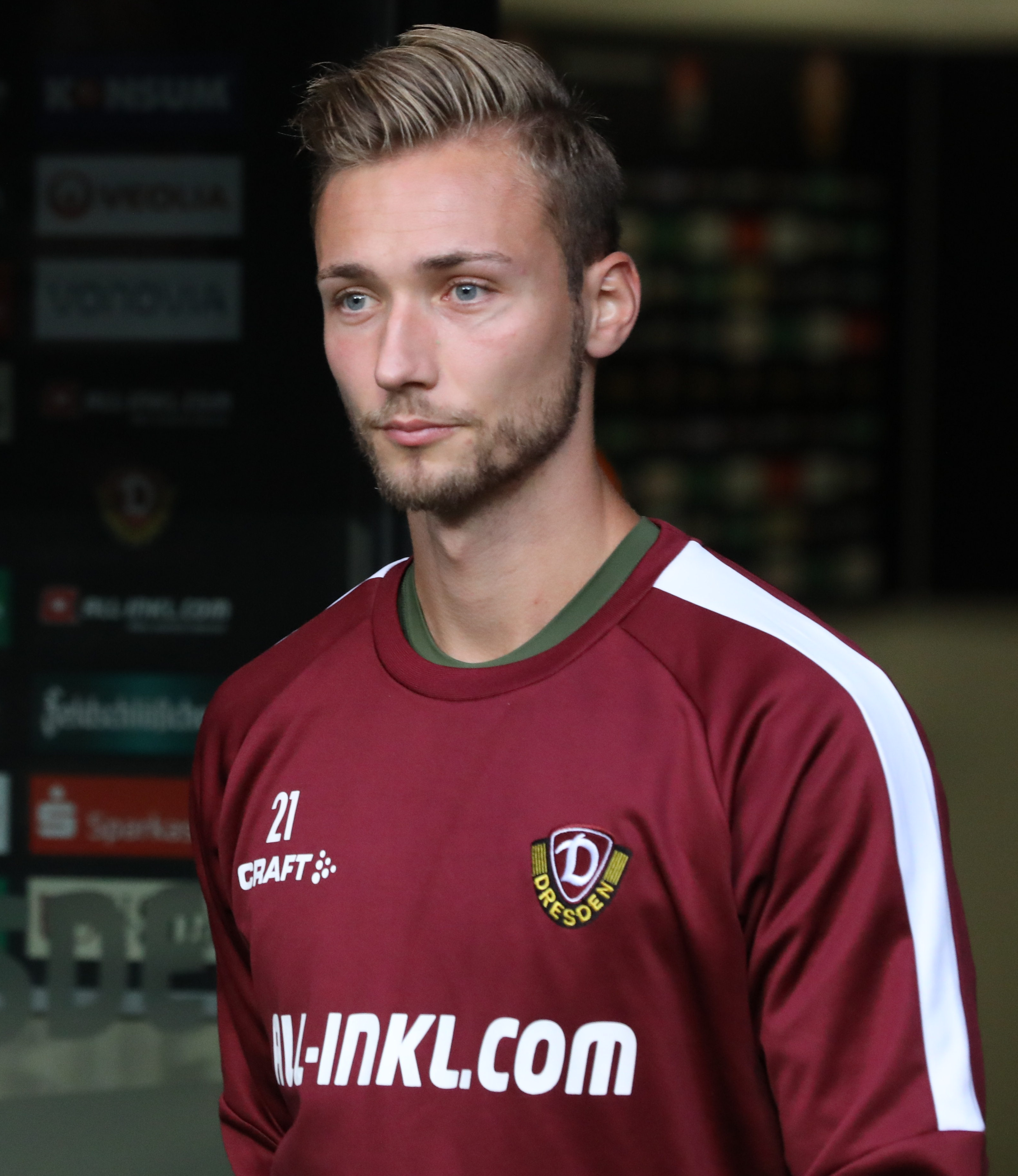
- Boss in 2019

Personal information
- Date of birth: 28 June 1993 (age 33)
- Place of birth: Cologne, Germany
- Height: 1.86 m (6 ft 1 in)
- Position: Goalkeeper

Team information
- Current team: SV Elversberg
- Number: 28

Youth career
- –2000: SV Auweiler-Esch
- 2000–2011: Bayer Leverkusen
- 2011–2012: Wuppertaler SV

Senior career*
Years	Team	Apps	(Gls)
2012–2014	Fortuna Düsseldorf II	41	(0)
2014–2015	SG Wattenscheid 09	34	(0)
2015–2018	Fortuna Köln	60	(0)
2018–2020	Dynamo Dresden	1	(0)
2020–2022	SV Wehen Wiesbaden	38	(0)
2022–2023	1. FC Magdeburg	3	(0)
2023–	SV Elversberg	1	(0)
- * Club domestic league appearances and goals as of 23 May 2024

Tim Boss (born 28 June 1993) is a German professional footballer who plays as a goalkeeper for Bundesliga club SV Elversberg.

== Career ==
In his youth, Boss played for Bayer Leverkusen and Wuppertaler SV. In the 2012–13 season he transferred to the second team Fortuna Düsseldorf, playing in the Regionalliga West. In the summer of 2014 he moved to league rivals SG Wattenscheid 09. He played in all 34 matches of the 2014–15 season.

After just one season, in July 2015, he moved to 3. Liga side Fortuna Köln. There he made his debut on 28 August 2015 during the 2–1 home win over 1. FC Magdeburg on matchday 6 when he came on as a substitute in the 83rd minute for André Poggenborg.

On 18 June 2018, Dynamo Dresden announced they had signed Boss on a two-year contract, valid for the three upper classes of the German football league system. He left Dresden in 2020 for Wehen Wiesbaden.

In 2020, Boss signed for SV Wehen Wiesbaden.

On 9 June 2022, he joined 1. FC Magdeburg.

On 29 June 2023, after one season at 1. FC Magdeburg, Boss moved to 2. Bundesliga side SV Elversberg.

== Career statistics ==
As of match played 26 May 2025

Appearances and goals by club, season and competition
Club	Season	League			DFB-Pokal		Other		Total	
Club	Season	Division	Apps	Goals	Apps	Goals	Apps	Goals	Apps	Goals
Fortuna Düsseldorf II	2012–13	Regionalliga West	25	0	—		—		25	0
Fortuna Düsseldorf II	2013–14	Regionalliga West	16	0	—		—		16	0
Fortuna Düsseldorf II	Total		41	0	—		—		41	0
SG Wattenscheid 09	2014–15	Regionalliga West	34	0	—		—		34	0
Fortuna Köln	2015–16	3. Liga	10	0	—		—		10	0
Fortuna Köln	2016–17	3. Liga	13	0	—		—		13	0
Fortuna Köln	2017–18	3. Liga	37	0	—		—		37	0
Fortuna Köln	Total		60	0	—		—		60	0
Dynamo Dresden	2018–19	2. Bundesliga	0	0	0	0	—		0	0
Dynamo Dresden	2019–20	2. Bundesliga	1	0	0	0	—		1	0
Dynamo Dresden	Total		1	0	0	0	—		1	0
Wehen Wiesbaden	2020–21	3. Liga	37	0	2	0	—		39	0
Wehen Wiesbaden	2021–22	3. Liga	1	0	0	0	—		1	0
Wehen Wiesbaden	Total		38	0	2	0	—		40	0
1. FC Magdeburg	2022–23	2. Bundesliga	3	0	0	0	—		3	0
SV Elversberg	2023–24	2. Bundesliga	1	0	0	0	—		1	0
SV Elversberg	2024–25	2. Bundesliga	0	0	0	0	0	0	0	0
SV Elversberg	2025–26	2. Bundesliga	0	0	0	0	—		0	0
SV Elversberg	2026–27	Bundesliga	0	0	0	0	—		0	0
SV Elversberg	Total		1	0	0	0	0	0	1	0
Career total			178	0	2	0	0	0	180	0
