= Jannes Hoffmann =

German footballer

Personal information
- Date of birth: 10 March 1996 (age 30)
- Place of birth: Engelskirchen, Germany
- Height: 1.84 m (6 ft 0 in)
- Position: Midfielder

Team information
- Current team: Eintracht Hohkeppel
- Number: 6

Youth career
- FC Wiehl 2000
- –2015: FC Köln

Senior career*
Years	Team	Apps	(Gls)
2014–2016	FC Köln II	27	(0)
2016–2017	FC Nürnberg II	26	(1)
2017–2019	Sonnenhof Großaspach	30	(1)
2019–2020	Fortuna Köln	13	(0)
2020–2023	1. FC Kaan-Marienborn	45	(9)
2023–2025	Eintracht Hohkeppel	40	(5)
2025	FC Hürth	13	(1)
2025–	Eintracht Hohkeppel	10	(0)

International career
2012	Germany U17	2	(0)
2013	Germany U18	1	(0)
- * Club domestic league appearances and goals as of 20:39, 11 January 2026 (UTC)

Jannes Hoffmann (born 10 March 1996) is a German footballer who plays as a midfielder for Eintracht Hohkeppel.
