= Koljić =

Koljić is a Bosnian surname. Notable people with the surname include:

- Alem Koljić (born 1999), German and Bosnian-Herzegovinian footballer
- Elvir Koljić (born 1995), Bosnian footballer
