= Erik Zenga =

Footballer (born 1993)

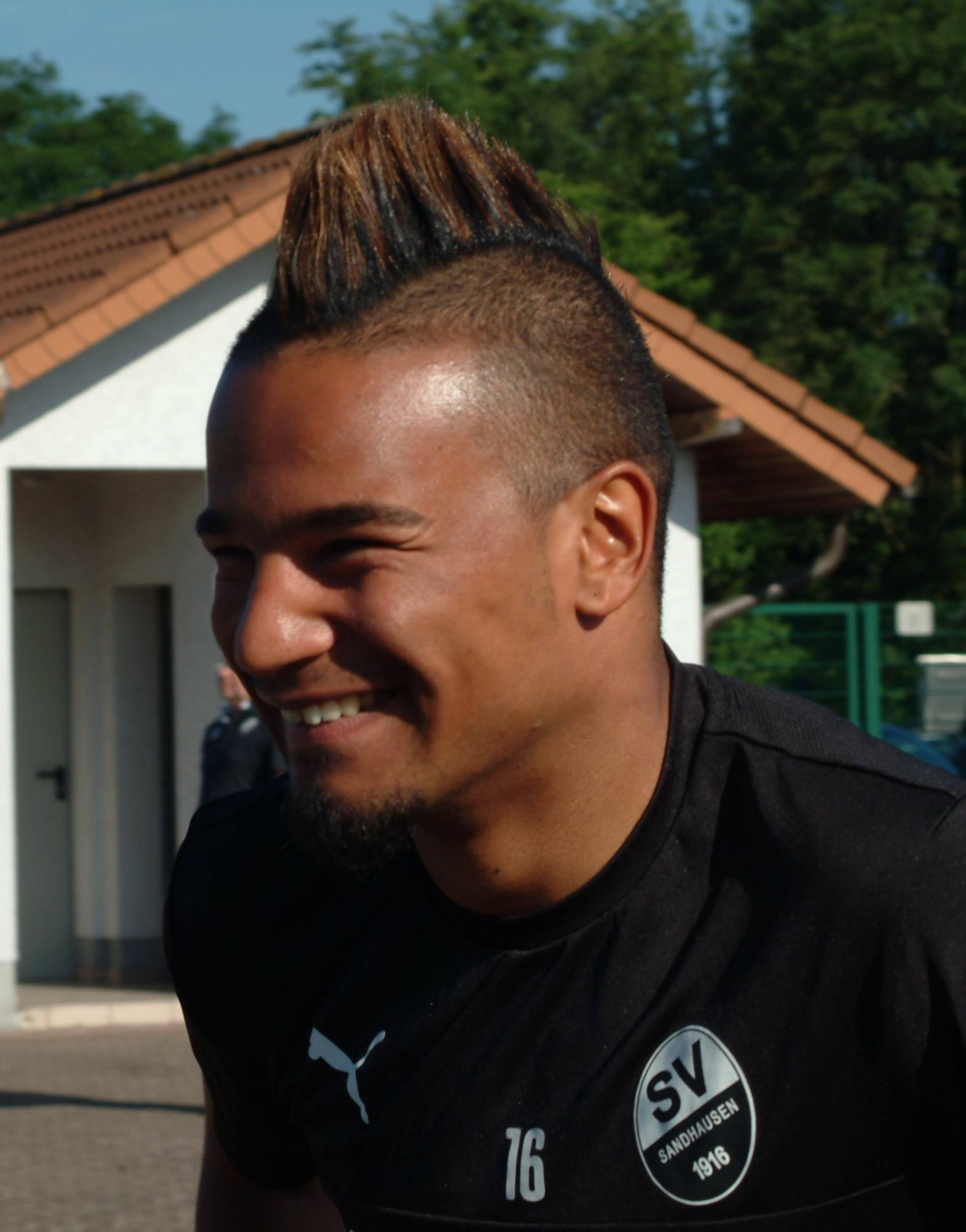
- Zenga in 2015

Personal information
- Date of birth: 18 January 1993 (age 33)
- Place of birth: Moscow, Russia
- Height: 1.81 m (5 ft 11 in)
- Position: Defensive midfielder

Team information
- Current team: SV Meppen
- Number: 18

Youth career
- 2000–2001: BV Bergisch Neukirchen
- 2001–2012: Bayer Leverkusen

Senior career*
Years	Team	Apps	(Gls)
2012–2014	Bayer Leverkusen II	40	(1)
2013–2014	→ VfL Osnabrück (loan)	29	(0)
2014–2015	Preußen Münster	19	(2)
2015–2023	SV Sandhausen	106	(2)
2015–2017	SV Sandhausen II	7	(1)
2017–2018	→ Hallescher FC (loan)	29	(3)
2024	MSV Duisburg	10	(0)
2025–	SV Meppen	38	(4)

International career
2010–2011	Germany U18	7	(0)
2011	Germany U19	1	(0)
2013–2014	Germany U20	9	(0)
- * Club domestic league appearances and goals as of 20 June 2026

Erik Zenga (born 18 January 1993) is a professional footballer who plays as a defensive midfielder for SV Meppen. Born in Russia, he has represented Germany at youth level.

== International career ==
Zenga was born to a Russian mother and an Angolan father, coming to Germany as a child, and was eligible for all three national teams. Zenga was a youth international for Germany. In January 2025, he signed with SV Meppen.

== Career statistics ==
As of 19 May 2024

Appearances and goals by club, season and competition
Club	Season	Division	League		Cup		Other		Total	
Club	Season	Division	Apps	Goals	Apps	Goals	Apps	Goals	Apps	Goals
Bayer Leverkusen II	2011–12	Regionalliga West	4	0	—		—		4	0
Bayer Leverkusen II	2012–13	Regionalliga West	33	1	—		—		33	1
Bayer Leverkusen II	2013–14	Regionalliga West	4	0	—		—		4	0
Bayer Leverkusen II	Total		40	1	—		—		40	1
VfL Osnabrück (loan)	2013–14	3. Liga	29	0	1	0	—		30	0
Preußen Münster	2014–15	3. Liga	19	2	1	0	—		20	2
SV Sandhausen II	2015–16	Oberliga Baden-Württemberg	3	1	—		—		3	1
SV Sandhausen II	2016–17	Oberliga Baden-Württemberg	4	0	—		—		4	0
SV Sandhausen II	Total		7	1	—		—		7	1
SV Sandhausen	2017–18	2. Bundesliga	1	0	—		—		1	0
SV Sandhausen	2018–19	2. Bundesliga	19	0	1	0	—		20	0
SV Sandhausen	2019–20	2. Bundesliga	11	1	1	0	—		12	1
SV Sandhausen	2020–21	2. Bundesliga	25	0	2	0	—		27	0
SV Sandhausen	2021–22	2. Bundesliga	33	1	1	0	—		34	1
SV Sandhausen	2022–23	2. Bundesliga	17	0	2	0	—		19	0
SV Sandhausen	Total		106	2	7	0	—		113	2
Hallescher FC (loan)	2017–18	3. Liga	29	3	—		—		29	3
MSV Duisburg	2023–24	3. Liga	10	0	—		—		10	0
Career total			240	9	7	0	—		247	9
