= Bernard Kyere =

Ghanaian footballer (born 1995)

Personal information
- Full name: Bernard Kyere Mensah
- Date of birth: 1 July 1995 (age 31)
- Place of birth: Accra, Ghana
- Height: 1.88 m (6 ft 2 in)
- Position: Centre-back

Team information
- Current team: Phönix Lübeck
- Number: 2

Youth career
- 2000–2010: Blau-Weiss Wiehre Freiburg
- 2010–2012: Offenburger FV
- 2012–2014: 1. FC Kaiserslautern

Senior career*
Years	Team	Apps	(Gls)
2014–2017	1. FC Kaiserslautern II	32	(2)
2017–2019	Fortuna Köln	57	(1)
2019–2021	Viktoria Köln	31	(0)
2021–2023	SpVgg Unterhaching	7	(0)
2023–2025	Victoria Rosport	46	(0)
2025–	Phönix Lübeck	0	(0)
- * Club domestic league appearances and goals as of 26 June 2025

Bernard Kyere Mensah (born 1 July 1995) is a professional footballer who plays as a centre-back for Phönix Lübeck. Born in Ghana, he grew up in Germany.

== Career ==
Kyere grew up in Kumasi, Ghana, before moving to Freiburg in Germany at age five. There he started playing football with local club Blau-Weiss Wiehre Freiburg at the age of eight. Later he played for the under-17 team of Offenburger FV and was called up for the Southern Baden youth team. In 2012, he was admitted to the 1. FC Kaiserslautern youth academy, and made his debut in the Regionalliga for the reserve team in the 2014–15 season. He made 34 league appearances during the following three seasons, scoring two goals.

On 21 June 2017, Kyere joined 3. Liga club Fortuna Köln after having left Kaiserslautern as a free agent. He made his debut for the side on the opening day of the season, coming on as a late substitute for Daniel Keita-Ruel in a 1–0 victory against VfR Aalen.

After suffering relegation from the 3. Liga with Fortuna Köln in the 2018–19 season, Kyere moved to Cologne city rivals Viktoria Köln on 7 June 2019.

On 23 August 2021, Kyere signed a two-year contract with Regionalliga Bayern club SpVgg Unterhaching. He made his debut for the club on 11 September in a 5–4 shoot-out win against TSV 1860 Rosenheim.

In August 2023, Kyere joined Luxembourg National Division club Victoria Rosport.

== Personal life ==
He is fluent in German, English and Twi.
