= Thorsten Nehrbauer =

German footballer

Personal information
- Date of birth: 12 January 1978 (age 48)
- Place of birth: Bonn, West Germany
- Height: 1.78 m (5 ft 10 in)
- Position: Midfielder

Youth career
- –1989: Bonner SC
- 1989–1997: Bayer Leverkusen

Senior career*
Years	Team	Apps	(Gls)
1997–1998	Bayer Leverkusen	0	(0)
1998–1999	Fortuna Düsseldorf	25	(1)
1999–2001	Mainz 05	35	(1)
2001–2003	Hannover 96	21	(1)
2003–2007	1. FC Saarbrücken	106	(3)
2007–2009	Kickers Emden	50	(0)
2009–2010	Bonner SC	9	(0)
2010–2012	TSV Germania Windeck	45	(3)
Total		291	(9)

International career
1997–1999	Germany U-21	13	(2)

Managerial career
- 2016–2019: 1. FC Kaan-Marienborn
- 2019–2020: Bonner SC
- 2021–2023: 1. FC Kaan-Marienborn
- 2023–2025: Sportfreunde Siegen
- * Club domestic league appearances and goals

Thorsten Nehrbauer (born 12 January 1978) is a German former football player. He later became a manager.
