= Toni Gänge =

German footballer

Personal information
- Date of birth: 27 January 1988 (age 38)
- Place of birth: Kyritz, East Germany
- Height: 1.87 m (6 ft 2 in)
- Position: Defender

Youth career
- –2003: SV Schwarz-Rot Neustadt
- 2003–2007: Energie Cottbus

Senior career*
Years	Team	Apps	(Gls)
2007–2009	Werder Bremen II	13	(0)
2009–2010	Hertha BSC II	29	(0)
2010–2012	SV Wilhelmshaven	46	(3)
2012–2020	1. FC Kaan-Marienborn		
- * Club domestic league appearances and goals

Toni Gänge (born 27 January 1988) is a German former professional footballer who played as a defender.

== Career ==
In January 2012, Gänge left SV Wilhelmshaven for Westfalenliga team 1. FC Kaan-Marienborn.

In July 2020, Gänge announced his retirement from playing due to cartilage damage.
