= Dominik Ernst =

German footballer (born 1990)

Personal information
- Date of birth: 8 August 1990 (age 36)
- Place of birth: Gelsenkirchen, West Germany
- Height: 1.78 m (5 ft 10 in)
- Position: Right-back

Team information
- Current team: Rot-Weiss Essen (assistant)

Youth career
- 1994–2003: Schalke 04
- 2003–2005: VfL Bochum
- 2005–2007: Rot-Weiss Essen
- 2007–2009: SpVgg Erkenschwick

Senior career*
Years	Team	Apps	(Gls)
2009–2010	SpVgg Erkenschwick	0	(0)
2010–2011	Wuppertaler SV	17	(1)
2011–2013	Schalke 04 II	58	(3)
2013–2014	Sportfreunde Lotte	28	(1)
2014–2017	Alemannia Aachen	90	(6)
2016	Alemannia Aachen II	1	(0)
2017–2019	Fortuna Köln	66	(2)
2019–2021	1. FC Magdeburg	47	(1)
2021–2023	1. FC Saarbrücken	47	(1)
2023–2025	Fortuna Köln	57	(3)
Total		411	(18)
- * Club domestic league appearances and goals

Dominik Ernst (born 8 August 1990) is a German former professional footballer who played as a right-back. He currently serves as an assistant coach of Rot-Weiss Essen.

== Career ==
=== Early career ===
In his youth, Ernst played for several clubs. He was with FC Schalke 04 until 2003, VfL Bochum from 2003 to 2005, Rot-Weiss Essen from 2005 to 2007, and SpVgg Erkenschwick from 2007 to 2009.

=== SpVgg Erkenschwick ===
In 2009, Ernst was promoted to the SpVgg Erkenschwick senior squad.

=== Wuppertaler SV ===
In July 2010, Ernst moved to Wuppertaler SV in the Regionalliga West. He made 17 league appearances, scoring once. His debut came on 6 August 2010 in a 1–1 home draw against Preußen Münster. He cum off the bench in the 55th minute, replacing Lukas van der Bergh. His first and only goal for the club came on 20 August 2010 in a 4–2 away win against Eintracht Trier. He made an immediate impact in that match, scoring the goal less than a minute after replacing Daniel Keita-Ruel. The goal was the third of four for Wuppertaler SV, and came in the 74th minute.

=== Schalke 04 II ===
In July 2011, Ernst moved to FC Schalke 04 II in the Regionalliga West. He made 58 league appearances over the span of two seasons, scoring three times. His debut came on 5 August 2011 in a 3–3 away draw against Bayer 04 Leverkusen II. He was introduced in the 29th minute of that game, replacing an injured Alban Sabah. His first goal for the club came on 27 March 2012 in a 5–3 away win against Wiedenbrück. He was subbed on for an injured Jonas Erwig-Drüppel in the 33rd, scored his team's fifth goal in the 78th, and was subbed off injured in the 86th minute. He was replaced by Jeffrey Volkmer.

=== Sportfreunde Lotte ===
In July 2013, Ernst was sold to Sportfreunde Lotte. He only spent one year with the club, making 28 league appearances. His debut came on 3 August 2013 in a 0–0 away draw with Viktoria Köln. He was brought on in the 90th minute, replacing Sofian Chahed. He scored his first league goal on 20 September 2013 in a 7–0 demolition of KFC Uerdingen 05. His goal was the last of the game, coming in the 89th minute. This was the only goal he scored for Lotte.

=== Alemannia Aachen ===
In July 2014, Ernst moved to Alemannia Aachen in the Regionalliga West. He spent three years with the club, scoring six times in 90 league appearances. His debut, first start, and first goal came in the same game, a 1–0 away victory against SG Wattenscheid 09 on 3 August 2014. He scored the last-gasp winner in the 91st minute. He also made one appearance for Alemannia Aachen II in a match against Bonner SC, where he played the full game.

=== Fortuna Köln ===
In July 2017, Ernst moved to SC Fortuna Köln. His debut and first start came in a 1–0 home win against VfR Aalen on 22 July 2017. His first goal for the club came on 10 March 2018 in a 2-0 win over Sportfreunde Lotte.

=== 1. FC Magdeburg ===
Ahead of the 2019–20 season, Ernst joined 1. FC Magdeburg.

=== 1. FC Saarbrücken ===
On 26 May 2021, it was announced that Ernst would join 1. FC Saarbrücken on a two-year contract.

=== Return to Fortuna Köln ===
On 31 July 2023, Ernst returned to Fortuna Köln, now in Regionalliga West.
