= Nils Röseler =

German footballer (born 1992)

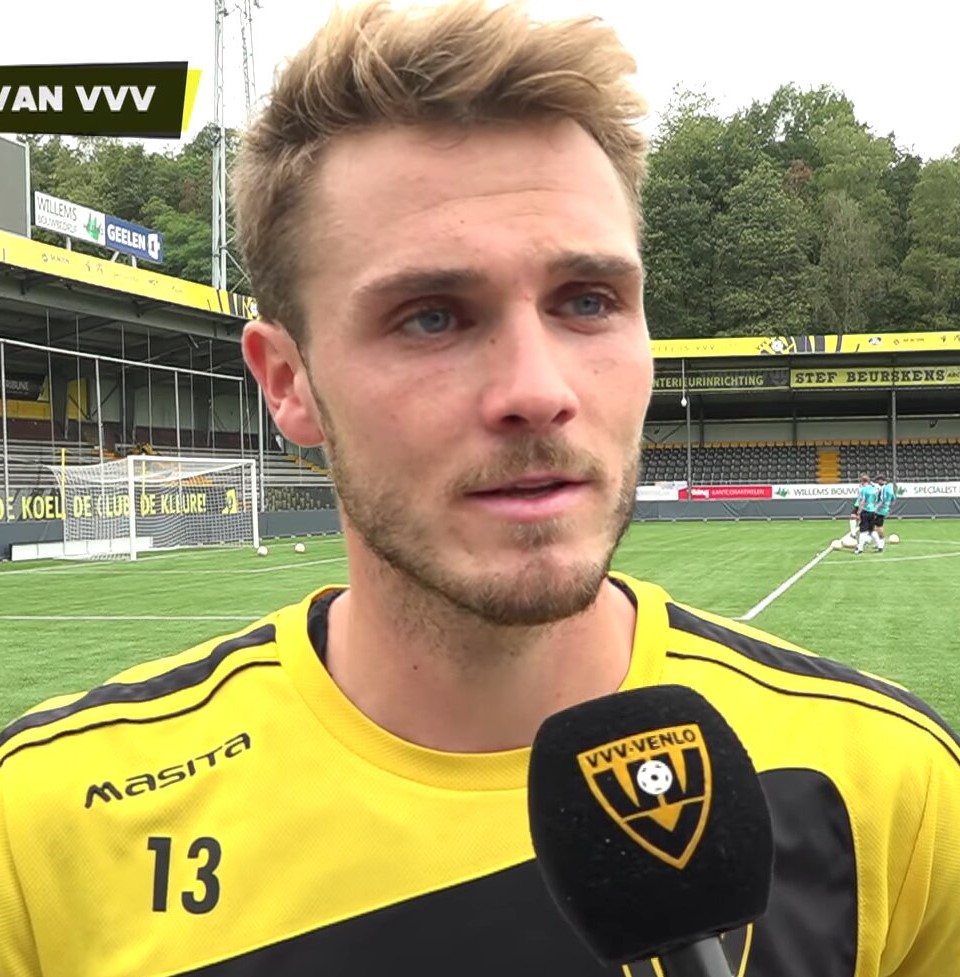
- Röseler in 2018

Personal information
- Date of birth: 10 February 1992 (age 34)
- Place of birth: Bad Bentheim, Germany
- Height: 1.90 m (6 ft 3 in)
- Position: Centre-back

Team information
- Current team: FC 08 Homburg
- Number: 13

Youth career
- –2003: SV Bad Bentheim
- 2003–2011: Twente

Senior career*
Years	Team	Apps	(Gls)
2011–2014	Jong Twente	44 (Note: Includes appearances in Beloften Eredivisie)	(2)
2011–2014	Twente	10	(0)
2012–2013	→ VVV-Venlo (loan)	26	(1)
2014–2016	Chemnitzer FC	66	(0)
2014–2015	Chemnitzer FC II	2	(0)
2016–2020	VVV-Venlo	128	(3)
2020–2021	SV Sandhausen	23	(2)
2021–2022	FC Ingolstadt	16	(0)
2022–2025	Roda JC	66	(2)
2025–	FC 08 Homburg	23	(1)
- * Club domestic league appearances and goals as of 26 June 2026

Nils Röseler (born 10 February 1992) is a German professional footballer who plays as a centre-back for Regionalliga Südwest club FC 08 Homburg.

== Club career ==
=== Twente ===
Röseler started playing football for hometown club SV Bad Bentheim. He was later scouted by Dutch club Twente and joined their youth academy. In January 2010, he signed a youth contract with the club, and on 23 July 2011, Röseler signed his first professional contract: a three-year deal.

Röseler made his debut in professional football on 14 December 2011, when he played a UEFA Europa League for Twente against Wisła Kraków. Head coach Co Adriaanse had placed him in the starting line-up – the team had at that point already clinched advancement as group winners. He made his Eredivisie debut on 19 February 2012, in a match against Vitesse, replacing Willem Janssen in the 92nd minute. On 18 March 2012, he was in the starting line-up for the first time due to an injury to Peter Wisgerhof and a suspension to Douglas, the regular starters. He scored an own goal that match, which was lost 2–0 to Feyenoord. While Röseler slowly broke into the first team, he also won the Beloften Eredivisie championship with the reserves. For the first team, he made 11 appearances in the 2011–12 season.

In the following season, Röseler was permanently promoted to the first team. Twente sent him on a one-season loan to VVV-Venlo in August 2012. There, he made 29 total appearances as the club suffered relegation to the Eerste Divisie.

After returning from VVV in 2013, he spent the next season playing for Jong Twente in the Eerste Divisie. He scored in his first match for the side after returning, opening the score with a header on 5 August 2013 in a 3–0 victory against FC Oss.

=== Chemnitzer FC ===
In June 2014, Röseler was released and he signed a two-year contract with 3. Liga club Chemnitzer FC. He made his debut for the club on 26 July 2014, the first matchday of the 2014–15 season, starting in a 3–0 away win over Hallescher FC at the Erdgas Sportpark.

Röseler made 66 appearances in the 3. Liga for Die Himmelblauen in the next two seasons. His contract was not extended as it expired in June 2016, making him a free agent.

=== VVV-Venlo ===
Röseler returned to his former club, VVV-Venlo, on 28 June 2016, this time on a permanent, two-year contract with an option for another season. He became a key player in defense for VVV and helped them to promotion to the Eredivisie in his first season back, as the club won the second division title.

Röseler remained an important player for the club from Venlo in the Eredivisie, and the club exercised the option to extend him another season on 28 March 2018. He was in the starting line-up in all VVV's Eredivisie games during the 2017–18 season, and on 15 May 2018 he signed a two-year contract extension keeping him at the club until 2020.

He left the club as his contract expired in June 2022. During his four-year stint at the club, Röseler made 135 total appearances for VVV in which he scored three goals. He grew into vice-captain for the club.

=== SV Sandhausen ===
On 16 June 2020, it was announced that Röseler would join 2. Bundesliga side SV Sandhausen on a free transfer for the 2020–21 season having agreed to a two-year contract. He made his debut for the club on 13 September 2020, starting in a 2–1 away win over TSV Steinbach in the DFB-Pokal. His 2. Bundesliga debut came on 19 September 2020, coming on as a substitute in the 92nd minute for Daniel Keita-Ruel in a 3–2 home victory against Darmstadt.

Röseler left Sandhausen on 17 August 2021, as his contract was terminated by mutual consent. He failed to become a permanent starter for the club, making 25 total appearances for the club in which he scored two goals.

=== FC Ingolstadt ===
After being a free agent for one day, Röseler joined FC Ingolstadt, who had recently won promotion from the 3. Liga, on 18 August 2021. He also failed to become a key player for Die Schanzer, making 16 appearances that season of which 12 as a starter.

=== Roda JC ===
Röseler returned to the Netherlands and joined Eerste Divisie club Roda JC on 11 July 2022. He signed a three-year contract with an option for an additional season. He made his debut for the club on 5 August 2022, starting in a 2–0 away win over Dordrecht on the first matchday of the 2022–23 season. On 5 February 2023, in a local derby against MVV, Röseler scored his first goal for Roda, equalising in an eventual 2–1 home win.

In May 2025, Roda JC confirmed that Röseler would leave the club following the expiration of his contract at the end of the 2024–25 season.

== International career ==
Röseler gained his first cap for the Germany under-18s on 14 December 2009 in a 6–3 win over Hungary, replacing Boné Uaferro in the 81st minute. He made eight appearances for the Germany U18s.

== Career statistics ==
As of match played 9 May 2025

Appearances and goals by club, season and competition
Club	Season	League			National cup (Note: Includes KNVB Cup and DFB-Pokal)		Europe		Other		Total	
Club	Season	Division	Apps	Goals	Apps	Goals	Apps	Goals	Apps	Goals	Apps	Goals
Twente	2011–12	Eredivisie	8	0	0	0	1 (Note: Appearances in UEFA Europa League)	0	2 (Note: Appearances in Eredivisie European play-offs)	0	11	0
Twente	2012–13	Eredivisie	0	0	0	0	2	0	0	0	2	0
Twente	2013–14	Eredivisie	2	0	0	0	—		—		2	0
Twente	Total		10	0	0	0	3	0	2	0	15	0
VVV-Venlo (loan)	2012–13	Eredivisie	26	1	1	0	—		2 (Note: Appearances in Eredivisie promotion/relegation playoffs)	0	29	1
Jong Twente	2013–14	Eerste Divisie	29	1	—		—		—		29	1
Chemnitzer FC	2014–15	3. Liga	34	0	2	0	—		2 (Note: Appearances in the Saxony Cup)	1	38	1
Chemnitzer FC	2015–16	3. Liga	32	0	1	0	—		1	1	34	0
Chemnitzer FC	Total		66	0	3	0	—		3	1	72	1
Chemnitzer FC II	2014–15	NOFV-Oberliga Süd	2	0	—		—		—		2	0
VVV-Venlo	2016–17	Eerste Divisie	35	2	2	0	—		—		37	2
VVV-Venlo	2017–18	Eredivisie	34	0	3	0	—		—		37	0
VVV-Venlo	2018–19	Eredivisie	34	1	1	0	—		—		35	1
VVV-Venlo	2019–20	Eredivisie	25	0	1	0	—		—		26	0
VVV-Venlo	Total		128	3	7	0	—		—		135	3
SV Sandhausen	2020–21	2. Bundesliga	23	2	2	0	—		—		25	2
FC Ingolstadt	2021–22	2. Bundesliga	16	0	1	0	—		—		17	0
Roda JC	2022–23	Eerste Divisie	30	1	1	0	—		—		31	1
Roda JC	2023–24	Eerste Divisie	13	0	0	0	—		0	0	13	0
Roda JC	2024–25	Eerste Divisie	23	1	0	0	—		—		23	1
Roda JC	Total		66	2	1	0	—		0	0	67	2
Career total			366	9	15	0	3	0	7	1	391	10

== Honours ==
Jong Twente

- Beloften Eredivisie: 2011–12

VVV-Venlo

- Eerste Divisie: 2016–17
