= Mehmet Kurt (footballer) =

German-Turkish footballer

Personal information
- Full name: Mehmet Alp Kurt
- Date of birth: 9 January 1996 (age 30)
- Place of birth: Hagen, Germany
- Height: 1.81 m (5 ft 11 in)
- Position: Defensive midfielder

Team information
- Current team: 52 Orduspor
- Number: 66

Youth career
- –2013: MSV Duisburg
- 2013–2015: Borussia Dortmund

Senior career*
Years	Team	Apps	(Gls)
2015–2016	Lüneburger SK Hansa	27	(0)
2016–2017	Sportfreunde Siegen	26	(1)
2017–2018	SC Verl	21	(1)
2018–2019	1. FC Kaan-Marienborn	25	(6)
2019–2021	SC Verl	56	(3)
2021–2022	Wehen Wiesbaden	26	(0)
2022–2023	Şanlıurfaspor	29	(2)
2023–2024	Menemen	35	(1)
2024–2026	Adana 01 FK	63	(4)
2026–	52 Orduspor	4	(0)
- * Club domestic league appearances and goals as of 1 October 2026

Mehmet Alp Kurt (born 9 January 1996) is a German-Turkish footballer who plays as a defensive midfielder for Turkish club 52 Orduspor.
