= Nico Brandenburger =

German footballer (born 1995)

Personal information
- Date of birth: 17 January 1995 (age 31)
- Place of birth: Berlin, Germany
- Height: 1.87 m (6 ft 2 in)
- Position: Defensive midfielder

Youth career
- BFC Preussen
- –2010: Hertha BSC
- 2010–2012: Borussia Mönchengladbach

Senior career*
Years	Team	Apps	(Gls)
2012–2015	Borussia Mönchengladbach	0	(0)
2012–2017	Borussia Mönchengladbach II	86	(8)
2015–2016	→ FC Luzern (loan)	0	(0)
2017–2019	Fortuna Köln	69	(5)
2019–2020	Preußen Münster	14	(0)
2020–2022	Fortuna Köln	40	(2)
2021–2022	Fortuna Köln II	3	(0)
2022–2023	1. FC Kaan-Marienborn	14	(0)
2023–2024	TSV Meerbusch	11	(0)

International career
2009–2010	Germany U15	2	(0)
2011	Germany U16	1	(0)
2011–2012	Germany U17	14	(1)
2012–2013	Germany U18	3	(0)
2012–2014	Germany U19	7	(1)
2014–2015	Germany U20	2	(0)
- * Club domestic league appearances and goals as of 02:56, 4 July 2024 (UTC)

Nico Brandenburger (born 17 January 1995) is a German professional footballer who most recently played as a defensive midfielder for TSV Meerbusch.

He has been a youth international for Germany on multiple levels, most recently for the under-20 team in 2015.

== Club career ==
On 19 May 2019, Preußen Münster announced that they had signed Brandenburger for the upcoming 2019–20 season.
