= Elsamed Ramaj =

Albanian footballer

Personal information
- Date of birth: 26 April 1996 (age 30)
- Place of birth: Koplik, Albania
- Height: 1.78 m (5 ft 10 in)
- Position: Left winger

Team information
- Current team: Sportfreunde Siegen
- Number: 11

Youth career
- –2014: FC Iserlohn
- 2014: Wuppertaler SV

Senior career*
Years	Team	Apps	(Gls)
2015	Wuppertaler SV	4	(0)
2015	Wuppertaler SV II	2	(0)
2015	Westfalia Rhynern	5	(0)
2016–2017	SV Hohenlimburg	38	(11)
2017–2018	TSG Sprockhövel	29	(4)
2018–2019	1. FC Kaan-Marienborn	31	(10)
2019–2020	Hansa Rostock	4	(0)
2019–2020	Hansa Rostock II	5	(4)
2020	→ VfB Lübeck (loan)	4	(1)
2020–2021	VfB Lübeck	23	(2)
2021–2022	Kickers Offenbach	22	(1)
2022–2024	Alemannia Aachen	35	(7)
2024	VfB Oldenburg	15	(1)
2024–2025	1. FC Düren	25	(3)
2025	Hessen Kassel	15	(4)
2026–	Sportfreunde Siegen	22	(4)
- * Club domestic league appearances and goals as of 23 September 2026

Elsamed Ramaj (born 26 April 1996) is an Albanian professional footballer who plays as a left winger for German club Sportfreunde Siegen.

== Club career ==
Born in Albania, Ramaj was initially active for FC Iserlohn in his youth before playing for Wuppertaler SV in the A-Junior Bundesliga in the 2014–15 season. In the second half of the season he was used four times on the first team, playing in the Oberliga Niederrhein. He then moved to Westfalia Rhynern in the Oberliga Westfalen. There he was used five times in the first half of the season before he left the club and joined SV Hohenlimburg. After a season at TSG Sprockhövel in the Oberliga, Ramaj moved to Regionalliga club 1. FC Kaan-Marienborn for the 2018–19 season, for whom he scored ten goals in 31 games. He was the top scorer in his team, but they were relegated back to the Oberliga at the end of the season.

For the 2019–20 season, Ramaj moved to 3. Liga club Hansa Rostock. He made his professional debut for Hansa Rostock in the 3. Liga on 20 July 2019, coming on as a substitute in the 84th minute for Pascal Breier in the away match against Viktoria Köln, which finished as a 3–3 draw. After four league appearances (three times from the start) and five appearances (four goals) on the second team in the Oberliga Nordost, he was loaned out to Regionalliga Nord club VfB Lübeck on 20 January 2020 until the end of the season. After the winter break, he was used in all four games (once from the start) until the season ended due to the COVID-19 pandemic and scored one goal. VfB Lübeck was declared champions and was promoted to the 3. Liga. At the end of June 2020 he agreed with Hansa Rostock to terminate his contract, which ran until June 2021 and signed a new contract with VfB Lübeck with a term until 30 June 2021.
