= Michael Kügler =

German footballer

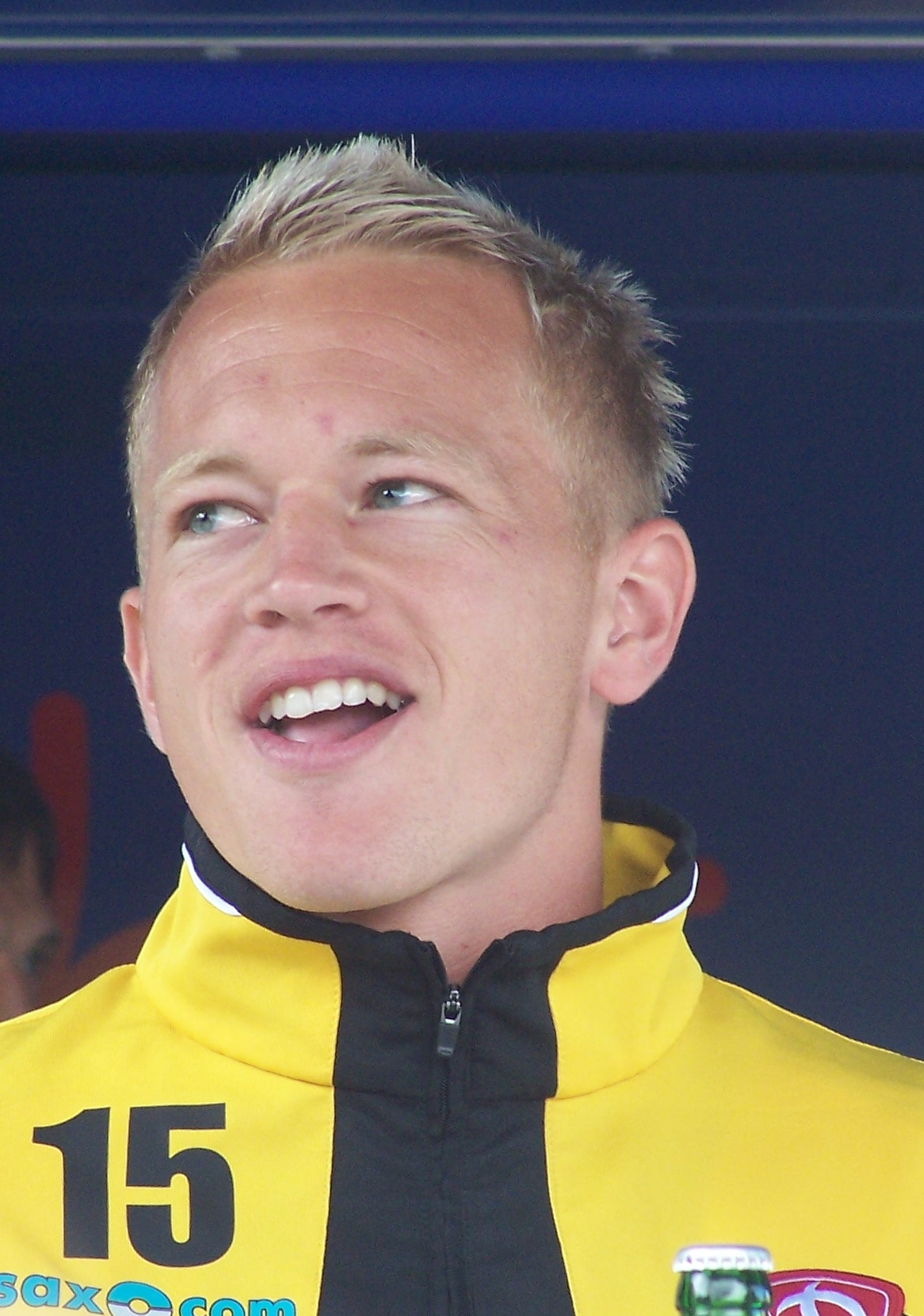
- Kügler in 2008 with Dynamo Dresden

Personal information
- Date of birth: 3 September 1981 (age 45)
- Place of birth: Olpe, West Germany
- Height: 1.74 m (5 ft 9 in)
- Position: Midfielder

Team information
- Current team: SV Dahl-Friedrichsthal (player-manager)
- Number: 8

Youth career
- SV Dahl-Friedrichsthal
- –1995: SpVg Olpe
- 1995–2000: Borussia Dortmund

Senior career*
Years	Team	Apps	(Gls)
2000–2002	Borussia Dortmund II	55	(2)
2002–2004	1. FC Nürnberg II	36	(3)
2002–2004	1. FC Nürnberg	3	(0)
2004–2006	VfL Osnabrück	59	(2)
2006–2009	Dynamo Dresden	20	(2)
2009	Dynamo Dresden II	3	(0)
2009–2010	Sportfreunde Lotte	19	(2)
2010–2016	1. FC Kaan-Marienborn		
2016	SV Ottfingen		
2018–	SV Dahl-Friedrichsthal		

Managerial career
- 2017–2018: SV Ottfingen
- 2019–: SV Dahl-Friedrichsthal (player-manager)
- * Club domestic league appearances and goals

Michael Kügler (born 3 September 1981 in Olpe) is a German footballer who is a player-manager for SV Dahl-Friedrichsthal.

== Career ==
In his early youth, he played for SV Dahl-Friedrichsthal and SpVg Olpe before moving to the youth department of Borussia Dortmund in 1995. Kügler was discovered by scouts from Dortmund after a rather successful time at SpVg Olpe and brought into the youth department of the Dortmund club. He won the German championship with the B-juniors in 1998. In 2000, he was promoted to the reserve team where he played for two seasons.

Kügler then moved to 1. FC Nürnberg on a free transfer and played two Bundesliga games for the club in its relegation season. In the following season in the 2. Bundesliga, he only made one appearance due to injuries and he then left FCN in summer 2004.

=== Later career ===
After six years at 1. FC Kaan-Marienborn, he moved to SV Ottfingen in the summer 2016. At the end of the year, he was announced as the club's new head coach. Beside that, he also played a few games for the club's reserve team. On 4 February 2018, Kügler was replaced by Sascha Lichtenthäler.

Two years later he moved to VfL Osnabrück in the Regionalliga Nord on a free transfer. He played 59 league games and two DFB-Pokal games. From the 2006–07 season, he was under contract with Dynamo Dresden. Initially, however, he was hardly used there due to serious knee injuries. On 28 August 2009, the contract with Dynamo Dresden, which originally ran until the end of June 2010, was terminated by mutual agreement. Kügler then moved to Sportfreunde Lotte.

In the summer 2018, Kügler returned to his first club, SV Dahl-Friedrichsthal, as a player and sporting director. At the end of 2018, he was appointed player-head coach of the club on an interim basis until the end of the season. Kügler still also maintained his duties as a sporting director. From the 2020–21 season, he would function as a player-assistant coach.
