= Maschinenfabrik Herkules =

Maschinenfabrik Herkules GmbH
- Trade name: Maschinenfabrik Herkules Hans Thoma GmbH
- Company type: GmbH
- Industry: Mechanical engineering
- Founded: 1911; 115 years ago
- Founder: Franz Thoma
- Headquarters: Siegen, Germany
- Key people: Maximilian Thoma (CEO)
- Owner: Thoma family
- Website: herkules-machinetools.com

Maschinenfabrik Herkules is a German machine tools manufacturing and technology company that focuses on large precision roll and workpiece machining.

The company is headquartered in Siegen, with German and international service and production units in Meuselwitz (Germany), the US and India. The family-owned company is headed by Maximilian Thoma who is the fourth generation of the family.

== History ==
In 1911, Franz Thoma founded a company to produce roll grinders and boring machines, among others.

Commissioning of the largest roll lathe that has ever been built to this day followed in 1975. The first HCC process-controlled roll grinder with correction on the fly was commissioned in 1987. The capacity was doubled when Maschinenfabrik Herkules Meuselwitz was acquired in 1992.

The company RD & D was acquired in 1996, followed by KPM Kube Plekker Microsystems (1999; which later merged with Herkules Controls Corporation to form HCC/KPM), Voith Paper Schleifmaschinen-Engineering (2001) and WaldrichSiegen (2004).

In 2009, Maschinenfabrik Herkules formed a joint venture with YATAI in China. At the beginning of 2011, after the joint venture was terminated, the HerkulesGroup acquired all shares of the Chinese company. The service unit, now wholly owned, goes by the name of Jiaxing GMT German Machine Tools Co. Ltd. By integrating Union Werkzeugmaschinen GmbH Chemnitz in June 2011, the HerkulesGroup realized the strategic expansion of its product range. UnionChemnitz is a world leader in the manufacture of horizontal boring and milling machines.

In May 2012, Herkules integrated the gearbox manufacturer RS Antriebstechnik (now RSGetriebe GmbH) in Sonthofen/Germany. RSGetriebe designs and builds special gearboxes for a diverse range of industries, such as the machine tool and plastics industry. The company PowerSparks GmbH, a developer of power electronic devices, was founded in 2016. Its core competence is the manufacturing of generators that supply power for surface finishing by Electrical Discharge Texturing (EDT).

== Innovations ==
- HCC/KPM roll measuring device (1995)
- HCC/KPM Roll Shop Diagnosis System (1996)
- Roll grinders with Monolith™ technology (2001)
- HCC/KPM Roll Surface Inspection System (2008)
- Herkules MACHtechnology (2013)

== Products ==
The company produces machine tools. The product range includes:

- Roll grinders
- Texturing machines
- Roll shops and roll shop equipment
- Lathes
- Notch milling machines
- Groove grinders
- Machine controls and measuring devices
