= Michael Kessel =

German footballer

Personal information
- Date of birth: 28 August 1984 (age 42)
- Place of birth: Germany
- Height: 1.76 m (5 ft 9 in)
- Position: Midfielder

Senior career*
| Years | Team | Apps | (Gls) |
| –2003 | TuS Höhenhaus | | |
| 2003–2005 | FC Junkersdorf | 28 | (1) |
| 2005–2007 | Borussia Mönchengladbach II | 11 | (0) |
| 2007–2011 | Germania Windeck | 105 | (13) |
| 2011–2019 | Fortuna Köln | 169 | (12) |
- * Club domestic league appearances and goals

Michael Kessel (born 28 August 1984) is a German former footballer who played as a midfielder.
