= Cédric Mimbala =

Congolese-German footballer

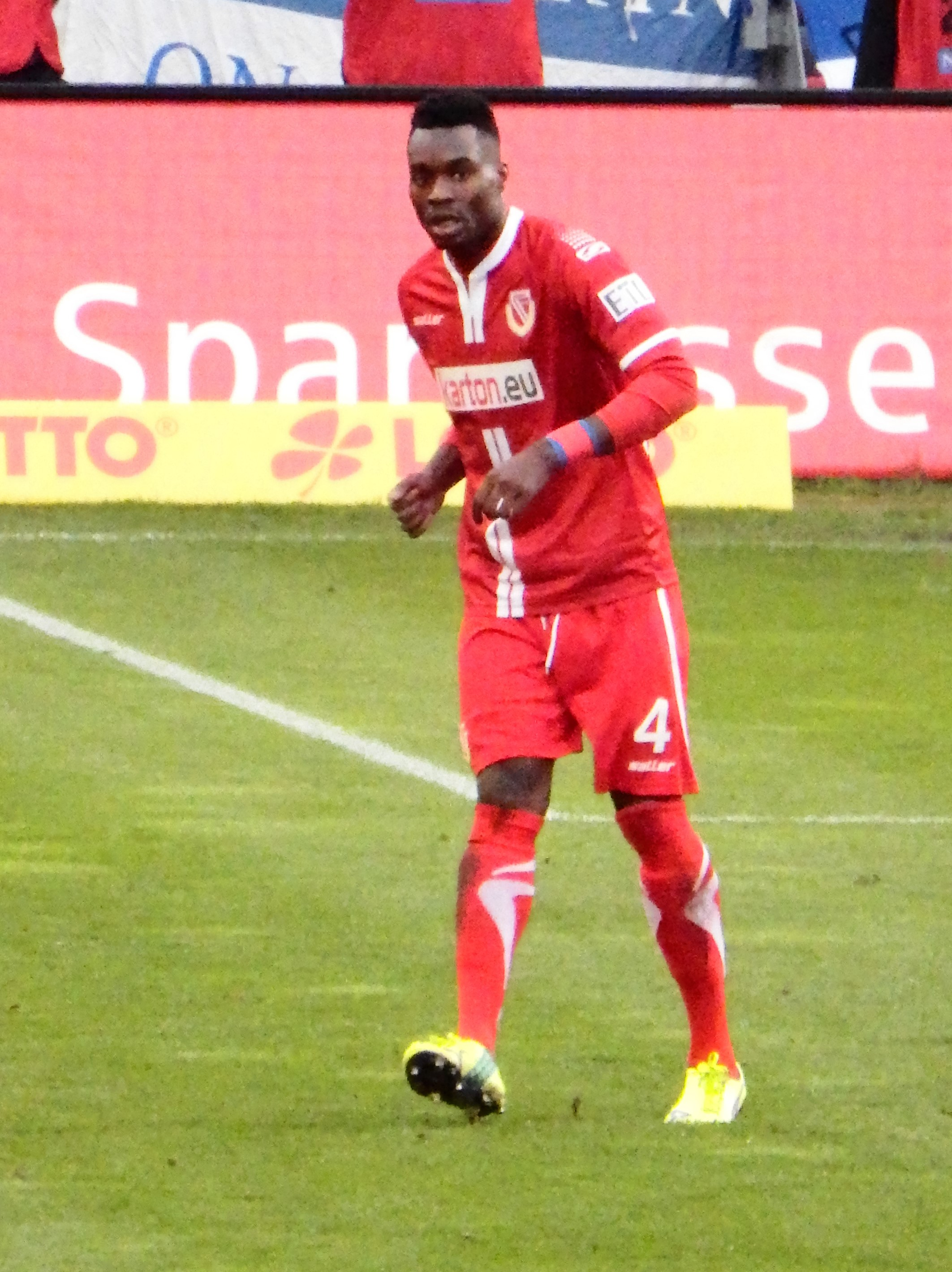
- Mimbala with Energie Cottbus in the 2014–15 season

Personal information
- Full name: Cédric Ebewa-Yam Mimbala
- Date of birth: 22 August 1986 (age 40)
- Place of birth: Bonn, West Germany
- Height: 1.88 m (6 ft 2 in)
- Position: Defender

Youth career
- 1997–1999: 1. FC Köln
- 1999–2000: Bonner SC
- 2000–2002: MSV Bonn
- 2002–2003: PSI Yurdumspor Köln
- 2004–2005: Alemannia Aachen

Senior career*
Years	Team	Apps	(Gls)
2006	K.F.C. Dessel Sport	0	(0)
2006–2007	SpVgg Bayern Hof	19	(0)
2007–2009	Fortuna Köln	25	(2)
2009–2010	Schalke 04 II	30	(2)
2010–2011	Rot Weiss Ahlen	6	(0)
2011	SC Genemuiden	5	(0)
2011	Sonnenhof Großaspach	5	(0)
2012	SV Roßbach/Verscheid	13	(2)
2012	FC Homburg	4	(2)
2012–2013	VfR Mannheim	15	(0)
2013–2014	SVN Zweibrücken	33	(6)
2014–2016	Energie Cottbus	53	(2)
2016–2018	Fortuna Köln	57	(1)
2018	Hessen Kassel	8	(0)
2018	Wormatia Worms	11	(1)
Total		284	(18)

International career
	DR Congo	4	(0)
- * Club domestic league appearances and goals

Cédric Ebewa-Yam Mimbala (born 22 August 1986) is a Congolese professional footballer who played as a defender. He also holds German citizenship.

== Club career ==
Born in Bonn, Mimbala began playing football with 1. FC Köln's youth academy. In 1999, he moved to Bonner SC, where he stayed one season. In 2000, the joined the club's city rival MSV Bonn. After two years, he signed a youth contract with PSI Yurdumspor Köln. Mimbala played six months for PSI Yurdumspor Köln, before transferring to Alemannia Aachen in January 2004.

He played two years in the Under 19 Bundesliga for Alemannia Aachen. In January 2006, he signed his first professional contract for K.F.C. Dessel Sport in the Belgian Second Division. After only six months in Belgium, he returned to Germany to sign for SpVgg Bayern Hof. For Hof, he played 19 games and scored one goal in the Oberliga Bayern. In July 2007, he signed for Fortuna Köln.

On 23 April 2009, he announced his transfer to FC Schalke 04 II. On 21 May 2010, he left the reserve team of FC Schalke 04 and signed with 3. Liga club Rot Weiss Ahlen.

== International career ==
Mimbala earned four caps for the DR Congo national team.

== Position ==
Mimbala plays primarily as a central defender, but has also been deployed as defensive midfielder or striker.

== Personal life ==
Mimbala who was born in Bonn, holds German passport, his parents immigrated from the DR Congo.
