= Kai Burger =

German footballer

Personal information
- Full name: Kai Burger
- Date of birth: 9 November 1992 (age 33)
- Place of birth: Cologne, Germany
- Height: 1.80 m (5 ft 11 in)
- Position: Forward

Team information
- Current team: Fortuna Köln
- Number: 38

Youth career
- TFG Köln-Nippes 1878
- –2011: SC West Köln

Senior career*
Years	Team	Apps	(Gls)
2011–2013	SC West Köln	46	(38)
2013	SG Köln-Worringen	17	(5)
2013–2014	SV Bergisch Gladbach	27	(3)
2014–2015	FC Bergheim 2000	21	(1)
2015–2016	SV Bergisch Gladbach	23	(2)
2015–2016	SV Bergisch Gladbach II	3	(3)
2016–	Fortuna Köln II	41	(26)
2017–	Fortuna Köln	1	(0)
- * Club domestic league appearances and goals as of 20:41, 15 December 2017 (UTC)

Kai Burger (born 9 November 1992) is a German footballer who plays as a forward for Fortuna Köln.
