= Okan Kurt =

Turkish footballer

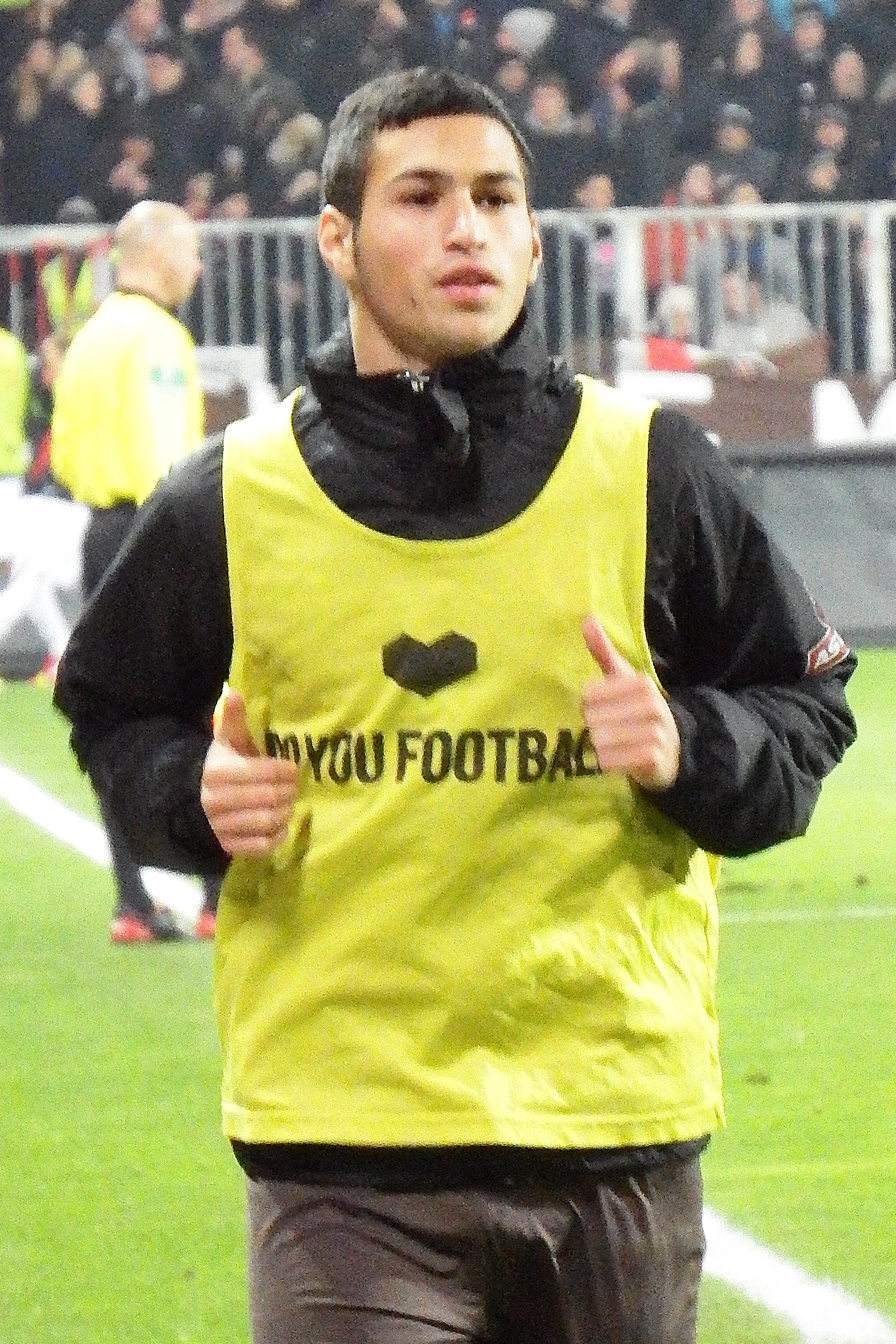
- Kurt in 2014

Personal information
- Full name: Okan Adil Kurt
- Date of birth: 11 January 1995 (age 31)
- Place of birth: Hamburg, Germany
- Height: 1.74 m (5 ft 9 in)
- Position: Midfielder

Team information
- Current team: TuS Dassendorf
- Number: 9

Youth career
- –2002: SC Concordia
- 2002–2013: FC St. Pauli

Senior career*
Years	Team	Apps	(Gls)
2013–2016	FC St. Pauli	10	(0)
2013–2016	FC St. Pauli II	82	(2)
2016–2017	Fortuna Sittard	16	(0)
2017–2019	Fortuna Köln	55	(3)
2019–2020	Adanaspor	13	(0)
2020–2023	Chemnitzer FC	66	(4)
2023–	TuS Dassendorf	22	(3)

International career
2010	Turkey U16	2	(0)
- * Club domestic league appearances and goals as of 05:30, 4 July 2024 (UTC)

Okan Adil Kurt (born 11 January 1995) is a Turkish professional footballer who plays as a midfielder for TuS Dassendorf.

== Career ==
Kurt made his 2. Bundesliga debut on 16 August 2013 against VfL Bochum replacing Christopher Buchtmann after 77 minutes during a 2–2 away draw.
