= Hamdi Dahmani =

German-Tunisian footballer

Personal information
- Date of birth: 16 November 1987 (age 38)
- Place of birth: Cologne, Germany
- Height: 1.78 m (5 ft 10 in)
- Position: Forward

Team information
- Current team: Fortuna Köln II
- Number: 11

Youth career
- Alemannia Aachen
- –2006: Bayer Leverkusen

Senior career*
Years	Team	Apps	(Gls)
2006–2007	GFC Düren 09	30	(3)
2007–2008	Sportfreunde Troisdorf 05		
2008–2012	Fortuna Köln	123	(21)
2012–2013	Viktoria Köln	17	(3)
2014–2019	Fortuna Köln	192	(46)
2019–2020	Rot-Weiss Essen	19	(2)
2020–2022	Alemannia Aachen	68	(14)
2023–	Fortuna Köln II	29	(12)
- * Club domestic league appearances and goals as of 19:29, 20 November 2023 (UTC)

Hamdi Dahmani (born 16 November 1987) is a German-Tunisian footballer who plays as forward or midfielder for the reserve team of Fortuna Köln.

== Career ==
In his youth, Dahmani played for Alemannia Aachen and Bayer Leverkusen. After stints with GFC Düren 09 and Sportfreunde Troisdorf 05, he joined Fortuna Köln in the summer of 2008. With them he played in the fourth tier of German football, the Regionalliga West, for four seasons. From July to September 2012 he had no club. Then he joined city and league rivals Viktoria Köln. After only one season, he parted ways once again. Again he became a free agent, before returning to his former club in January 2014. Fortuna now played in the 3. Liga after promotion from the Regionlliga the previous season. He made his 3. Liga debut on 27 July 2014, the first matchday of the season against Sonnenhof Großaspach, playing the full 90 minutes in the 2–1 defeat.

On 25 June 2019, Dahmani joined Rot-Weiss Essen on a two-year contract.
