= 1. FC Kaan-Marienborn =

- Full name: 1. FC Kaan-Marienborn 07 e. V.
- Founded: 1 July 2007; 17 years ago
- Stadium: Herkules-Arena Im Breitenbachtal
- Capacity: 4,000
- Chairman: Florian Leipold
- Manager: Thorsten Nehrbauer
- League: Regionalliga West
- 2021–22: Oberliga Westfalen, 1st (promoted)
- Website: http://www.fc-kaan.de/
Home colours

1. FC Kaan-Marienborn is a German association football club based in Siegen, that competes in Regionalliga West.

== History ==
The club was founded on 1 July 2007, taking over the football department of TuS 1886 Kaan-Marienborn, which had existed since 1886. Funded by Christoph Thoma, the former managing partner of Maschinenfabrik Herkules in Kaan-Marienborn, the club was promoted to the Landesliga as early as 2008 and was further promoted to the Westfalenliga two years later. There, the team already reached 3rd place in its first season. In 2016, the team was finally promoted to the Oberliga Westfalen as the runner-up of the Westfalenliga Division 2 and winner of the play-off match against the runner-up of the other division, Delbrücker SC. Two years later, they were promoted to the Regionalliga West. After the 2018–19 season, the team was relegated directly after finishing in second to last place.

In the 2019–20 season, the team again competed in the Oberliga Westfalen with Tobias Wurm, who had previously held the position of assistant coach, moving up to head coach and finishing 9th in the table after 21 matchdays. Due to the COVID-19 pandemic in Germany, the season was cut short. The question of promotion was decided on a points per game basis. Here, 1. FC Kaan-Marienborn averaged 1.43 points.

The 2020–21 season also ultimately fell victim to the COVID-19 pandemic. At the end of the season, the team was in 6th place in the table (7 matches, 5 wins, 1 draw, 1 loss).

Since the beginning of October 2021, Thorsten Nehrbauer (the coach with whom the team achieved promotion to the Oberliga and Regionalliga) has been back in Kaan and so the club is looking to achieve promotion to the Regionalliga once again. They achieved this goal at the end of the season, gaining promotion to the 2022–23 Regionalliga West.

1. FC Kaan-Marienborn withdrew their senior team after the 2022–23 season due to not being able to fulfill future stadium requirements. Their reserve team, currently playing in the eleventh-tier Kreisliga C, will function as their new senior team from the 2023–24 season onwards.

== Season overview ==
Season	League	Pos.	W	D	L	Goals	Pts.	Notes
2007–08	Bezirksliga	1st	27	3	0	87–16	84	Promoted
2008–09	Landesliga	4th	15	7	8	57–33	52	
2009–10	Landesliga	1st	19	10	1	65–17	67	Promoted
2010–11	Westfalenliga	3rd	16	10	8	63–41	58	
2011–12	Westfalenliga	12th	10	11	11	42–43	41	
2012–13	Westfalenliga	8th	12	7	11	43–44	43	
2013–14	Westfalenliga	2nd	18	5	7	60–38	59	
2014–15	Westfalenliga	6th	12	13	5	57–38	49	
2015–16	Westfalenliga	2nd	17	8	5	46–19	59	Promoted
2016–17	Oberliga Westfalen	7th	12	12	10	38–40	48	
2017–18	Oberliga Westfalen	2nd	18	6	6	47–29	60	Promoted
2018–19	Regionalliga West	15th	9	12	13	50–54	39	Relegated
2019–20	Oberliga Westfalen	9th	9	4	9	40–30	36	Season abandoned due to COVID-19
2020–21	Oberliga Westfalen	6th	5	1	1	27–7	16	Season abandoned due to COVID-19

== Managers ==
Time in office	Manager
1 July 2008 – 31 December 2009	Gerhard Noll
10 January 2010 – 30 June 2010	Jörg Rokitte
1 July 2010 – 30 June 2011	Dietmar Schacht
1 July 2011 – 29 November 2011	Jörg Rokitte
30 November 2011 – 8 January 2012	Sveto Poletan
9 January 2012 – 27 January 2014	Peter Wongrowitz
30 January 2014 – 30 June 2019	Thorsten Nehrbauer
1 July 2019 – 30 September 2021	Tobias Wurm
1 October 2021 – present	Thorsten Nehrbauer

== Notable players ==
Current

- Lars Bender
- Markus Pazurek

Former

- Mehmet Kurt
- René Lewejohann
- Toni Gänge
- Michael Kügler
- Elsamed Ramaj

== Honours ==
- Oberliga Westfalen
  - Champions: 2022
