= Markus Pazurek =

German footballer

Personal information
- Date of birth: 18 December 1988 (age 37)
- Place of birth: Andernach, Rhineland-Palatinate, West Germany
- Height: 1.85 m (6 ft 1 in)
- Position: Defensive midfielder

Team information
- Current team: Sportfreunde Siegen
- Number: 55

Youth career
- SG Bad Breisig
- –2007: TuS Koblenz

Senior career*
Years	Team	Apps	(Gls)
2007–2009	TuS Mayen	40	(3)
2009–2010	VfB Stuttgart II	15	(2)
2010–2011	1860 Munich II	28	(5)
2011–2013	1. FC Saarbrücken	25	(0)
2013–2018	Fortuna Köln	140	(10)
2018–2021	Borussia Mönchengladbach II	92	(10)
2021–2023	1. FC Kaan-Marienborn	61	(24)
2023–2024	SSVg Velbert	16	(5)
2024–	Sportfreunde Siegen	11	(3)
- * Club domestic league appearances and goals as of 26 May 2024

Markus Pazurek (born 18 December 1988) is a German footballer who plays for Sportfreunde Siegen in the Oberliga Westfalen.
