= Alexander Winkler (footballer) =

German footballer

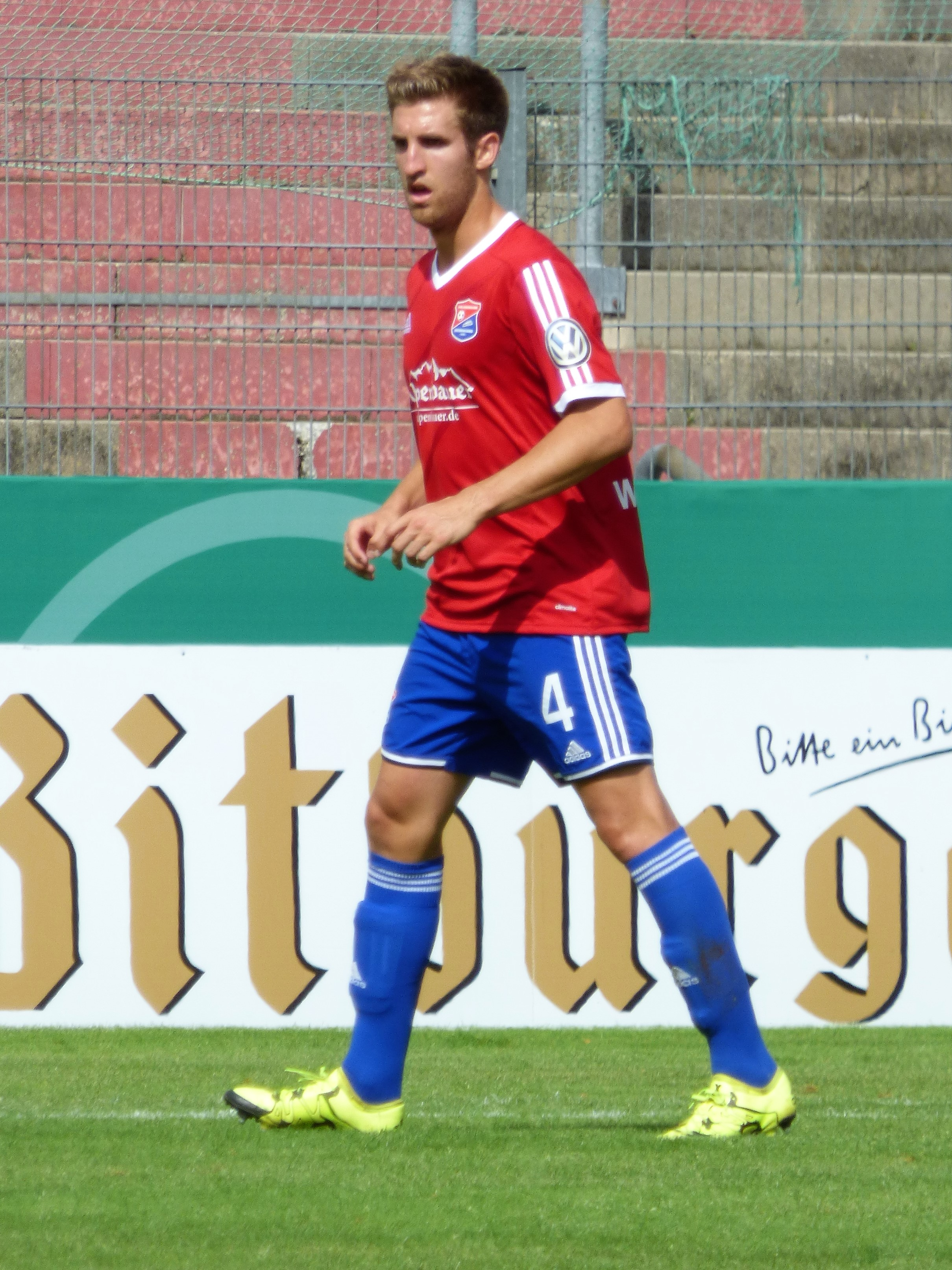
- Winkler with SpVgg Unterhaching in 2016

Personal information
- Date of birth: 26 January 1992 (age 34)
- Place of birth: Munich, Germany
- Height: 1.90 m (6 ft 3 in)
- Position: Centre-back

Team information
- Current team: SpVgg Unterhaching
- Number: 4

Youth career
- SpVgg Feldmoching
- –2007: Bayern Munich
- 2007–2011: SpVgg Unterhaching

Senior career*
Years	Team	Apps	(Gls)
2011–2013	SpVgg Unterhaching II	19	(0)
2011–2013	SpVgg Unterhaching	4	(0)
2013–2014	Wacker Burghausen II	23	(2)
2014–2015	SpVgg Neckarelz	8	(0)
2014	→ SpVgg Neckarelz II	4	(0)
2015–2020	SpVgg Unterhaching	160	(8)
2020–2022	1. FC Kaiserslautern	39	(2)
2023	Hallescher FC	8	(0)
2023–2024	Neuchâtel Xamax	27	(1)
2025	Würzburger Kickers	10	(3)
2025–	SpVgg Unterhaching	40	(2)
- * Club domestic league appearances and goals as of 27 September 2026

Alexander Winkler (born 26 January 1992) is a German professional footballer who plays as a centre-back for Regionalliga Bayern club SpVgg Unterhaching.

== Career ==
Winkler began his career with, Unterhaching who he joined from Bayern Munich's youth team in 2007, and made his 3. Liga debut four years later, as a substitute for the injured Jonas Hummels in a 4–1 defeat to Kickers Offenbach. He suffered an injury himself three games later, which ruled him out of action for almost two years, before he left Unterhaching at the end of the 2012–13 season. He signed for Wacker Burghausen II shortly afterwards, where he would spend one season before joining SpVgg Neckarelz of the Regionalliga Südwest in July 2014. Later he signed again for SpVgg Unterhaching.

On 4 January 2023, Winkler signed a 1.5-year contract with Hallescher FC.

On 24 July 2023, Winkler moved to Neuchâtel Xamax in Switzerland.

In January 2025, Winkler joined FC Würzburger Kickers in the Regionalliga Bayern.
