= Lars Bender (footballer, born 1988) =

German footballer

Personal information
- Date of birth: 8 January 1988 (age 38)
- Place of birth: Koblenz, West Germany
- Height: 1.86 m (6 ft 1 in)
- Position: Midfielder

Team information
- Current team: Fortuna Köln II
- Number: 28

Youth career
- FC Urbar
- –2001: SV Niederwerth
- 2001–2007: TuS Koblenz

Senior career*
Years	Team	Apps	(Gls)
2007–2008	TuS Koblenz II		
2008–2011	TuS Koblenz	47	(3)
2011–2013	Kickers Offenbach	49	(0)
2013–2014	Eintracht Trier	30	(6)
2014–2018	Fortuna Köln	110	(7)
2018–2019	Energie Cottbus	10	(1)
2019–2021	Fortuna Köln	28	(1)
2021	Wuppertaler SV	17	(1)
2021–2023	1. FC Kaan-Marienborn	41	(3)
2023–	Fortuna Köln II	6	(0)
- * Club domestic league appearances and goals as of 20 May 2024

Lars Bender (German pronunciation: [ˈlaʁs ˈbɛndɐ]; born 8 January 1988) is a German footballer who plays as a midfielder for Fortuna Köln II in Mittelrheinliga.

== Career ==
Bender made his debut on the professional league level in the 2. Bundesliga for TuS Koblenz on 22 August 2008, when he came on as a substitute in the 67th minute in a game against FSV Frankfurt. On 16 June 2011, he joined Kickers Offenbach.
