= Martin Ludwig =

German footballer

Personal information
- Date of birth: 16 October 1998 (age 28)
- Place of birth: Germany
- Height: 1.82 m (6 ft 0 in)
- Position: Midfielder

Team information
- Current team: VfL Halle 1896
- Number: 47

Youth career
- –2014: 1. FC Magdeburg
- 2014–2017: Hallescher FC

Senior career*
Years	Team	Apps	(Gls)
2017–2019	Hallescher FC	19	(0)
2019	→ Germania Halberstadt (loan)	4	(0)
2019–2020	1. FC Merseburg	17	(4)
2020–2022	Union Sandersdorf	37	(12)
2022–	VfL Halle 1896	11	(4)
- * Club domestic league appearances and goals as of 12 November 2022

Martin Ludwig (born 16 October 1998) is a German footballer who plays as a midfielder for VfL Halle 1896.

== Career ==
On 3 January 2019, Ludwig was loaned out from Hallescher FC to Germania Halberstadt for the remainder of the season.
