= Sören Dieckmann =

German association football player

Personal information
- Date of birth: 16 January 1996 (age 30)
- Place of birth: Dortmund, Germany
- Height: 1.87 m (6 ft 2 in)
- Position: Left-back

Team information
- Current team: Hoffenheim II
- Number: 3

Youth career
- TuRa Rüdinghausen
- –2011: VfL Bochum
- 2011–2013: DJK TuS Hordel
- 2013–2014: Eintracht Dortmund
- 2014–2015: Borussia Dortmund

Senior career*
Years	Team	Apps	(Gls)
2015–2019	Borussia Dortmund II	89	(11)
2019–2021	SV Sandhausen	8	(0)
2021–2022	Fortuna Köln	31	(1)
2022–	Hoffenheim II	21	(2)
- * Club domestic league appearances and goals as of 25 August 2023

Sören Dieckmann (born 16 January 1996) is a German professional footballer who plays as a left-back for Hoffenheim II.

== Career ==
In January 2019, Dieckmann moved from Borussia Dortmund II to 2. Bundesliga club SV Sandhausen. He made his professional debut for Sandhausen in the 2. Bundesliga on 30 January 2019, starting in the away match against Hamburger SV before being substituted out in the 58th minute for Fabian Schleusener, with the match finishing as a 2–1 loss.
