= Alem Koljić =

German and Bosnian-Herzegovinian footballer

Personal information
- Full name: Alem Koljić
- Date of birth: 16 February 1999 (age 27)
- Place of birth: Dernbach, Germany
- Height: 1.76 m (5 ft 9 in)
- Positions: Left-back; centre-back

Team information
- Current team: Rot-Weiß Hadamar
- Number: 13

Youth career
- 2003–2007: TuS Montabaur
- 2007–2008: JSG Niederelbert
- 2008–2012: TuS Koblenz
- 2012–2014: Bayer Leverkusen
- 2014–2016: Schalke 04
- 2016–2017: MSV Duisburg
- 2017–2018: Fortuna Köln

Senior career*
Years	Team	Apps	(Gls)
2017–2018	Fortuna Köln II	1	(0)
2018–2020	Fortuna Köln	19	(0)
2020	Hessen Dreieich	2	(0)
2020–2023	Rot-Weiß Koblenz	38	(0)
2023–	Rot-Weiß Hadamar	40	(9)

International career
2013	Germany U15	1	(0)
- * Club domestic league appearances and goals as of 18:56, 9 January 2025 (UTC)

Alem Koljić (born 16 February 1999) is a German and Bosnian-Herzegovinian footballer who plays as a left-back or centre-back for SV Rot-Weiß Hadamar.
