= André Poggenborg =

German footballer

Personal information
- Date of birth: 17 September 1983 (age 43)
- Place of birth: Münster, West Germany
- Height: 1.85 m (6 ft 1 in)
- Position: Goalkeeper

Team information
- Current team: SV Meppen (goalkeeping coach)

Youth career
- DJK GW Albersloh
- –1997: SC Greven 09
- 1997–2002: Preußen Münster

Senior career*
Years	Team	Apps	(Gls)
2002–2005	Preußen Münster	18	(0)
2005–2006	MSV Duisburg II	21	(0)
2006–2007	BV Cloppenburg		
2007–2010	Sportfreunde Lotte	99	(0)
2010–2012	Eintracht Trier	60	(0)
2012–2019	Fortuna Köln	163	(0)

Managerial career
- 2017–2019: Fortuna Köln (goalkeeping coach)
- 2020–: SV Meppen (goalkeeping coach)
- * Club domestic league appearances and goals as of 29 September 2021

André Poggenborg (born 17 September 1983) is a German goalkeeping coach and former footballer.

== Career ==
=== Playing career ===
The last club he played for was Fortuna Köln.

=== Coaching career ===
Since June 2017, Poggenborg was also the goalkeeping coach of Fortuna Köln. However, he remained as a stand-by player for the first team.
