= Julius Biada =

German footballer

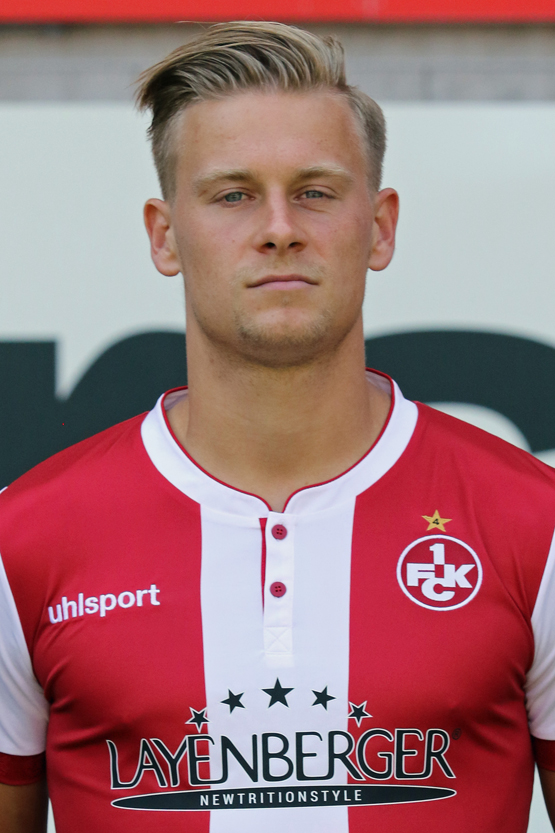
- Biada with 1. FC Kaiserslautern in 2018

Personal information
- Full name: Julius Valentin Biada
- Date of birth: 3 November 1992 (age 34)
- Place of birth: Cologne, Germany
- Height: 1.79 m (5 ft 10 in)
- Position: Attacking midfielder

Youth career
- ESV Olympia Köln
- Heiligenhauser SV
- –2007: Bonner SC
- 2008–2009: SF Troisdorf
- 2009–2010: Bonner SC
- 2010–2011: Bayer Leverkusen

Senior career*
Years	Team	Apps	(Gls)
2011–2012	Bayer Leverkusen II	23	(3)
2012–2013	Schalke 04 II	33	(11)
2013–2015	Darmstadt 98	17	(1)
2015–2016	Fortuna Köln	47	(13)
2016–2018	Eintracht Braunschweig	31	(3)
2018–2019	1. FC Kaiserslautern	16	(1)
2019–2022	SV Sandhausen	49	(7)
2022–2024	Saarbrücken	34	(1)
2024–2025	Fortuna Köln	17	(2)
Total		267	(42)
- * Club domestic league appearances and goals

Julius Biada (born 3 November 1992) is a German former professional footballer who played as an attacking midfielder.

== Career ==
Biada played as a youth for a number of clubs around his hometown of Cologne, ending up at Bayer Leverkusen, where he broke into the reserve team for the 2011–12 season. He spent the following season with FC Schalke 04 II, where he scored 11 goals, making him the team's joint top scorer along with Manuel Torres.

In July 2013, he signed for SV Darmstadt 98 of the 3. Liga, and made his debut in a first round DFB Pokal match against Borussia Mönchengladbach, as a substitute for Jérôme Gondorf. Darmstadt caused an upset by eliminating the Bundesliga side 5–4 on penalties after the match ended 0–0. In January 2015, Biada transferred from Darmstadt to SC Fortuna Köln.

In 2016, Biada joined Eintracht Braunschweig on a free transfer.

On 25 May 2022, he agreed to join Saarbrücken for the 2022–23 season.

On 29 August 2024, Biada joined SC Fortuna Köln again. He retired from professional football in August 2025 after being diagnosed with myocarditis.
