= Christian Kinsombi =

German footballer (born 1999)

Personal information
- Date of birth: 24 August 1999 (age 27)
- Place of birth: Rudesheim am Rhein, Germany
- Height: 1.77 m (5 ft 10 in)
- Position: Left winger

Team information
- Current team: Energie Cottbus
- Number: 7

Youth career
- –2012: Wehen Wiesbaden
- 2012–2018: Mainz 05

Senior career*
Years	Team	Apps	(Gls)
2018–2019	Mainz 05 II	42	(2)
2019–2021	KFC Uerdingen	52	(2)
2021–2023	SV Sandhausen	49	(8)
2023–2026	Hansa Rostock	77	(14)
2026–	Energie Cottbus	0	(0)
- * Club domestic league appearances and goals as of 28 May 2026

Christian Kinsombi (born 24 August 1999) is a German professional footballer who plays as a left winger for 2. Bundesliga club Energie Cottbus.

== Career ==
Kinsombi made his professional debut for KFC Uerdingen in the first round of the 2019–20 DFB-Pokal on 9 August 2019, coming on as a substitute in the 58th minute for Osayamen Osawe in the home match against Bundesliga side Borussia Dortmund.

On 25 May 2026, Kinsombi signed with Energie Cottbus in 2. Bundesliga.

== Personal life ==
Kinsombi is of Democratic Republic of the Congo descent. His older brother David Kinsombi is also a professional footballer.
