= Bashkim Ajdini =

Swedish footballer (born 1992)

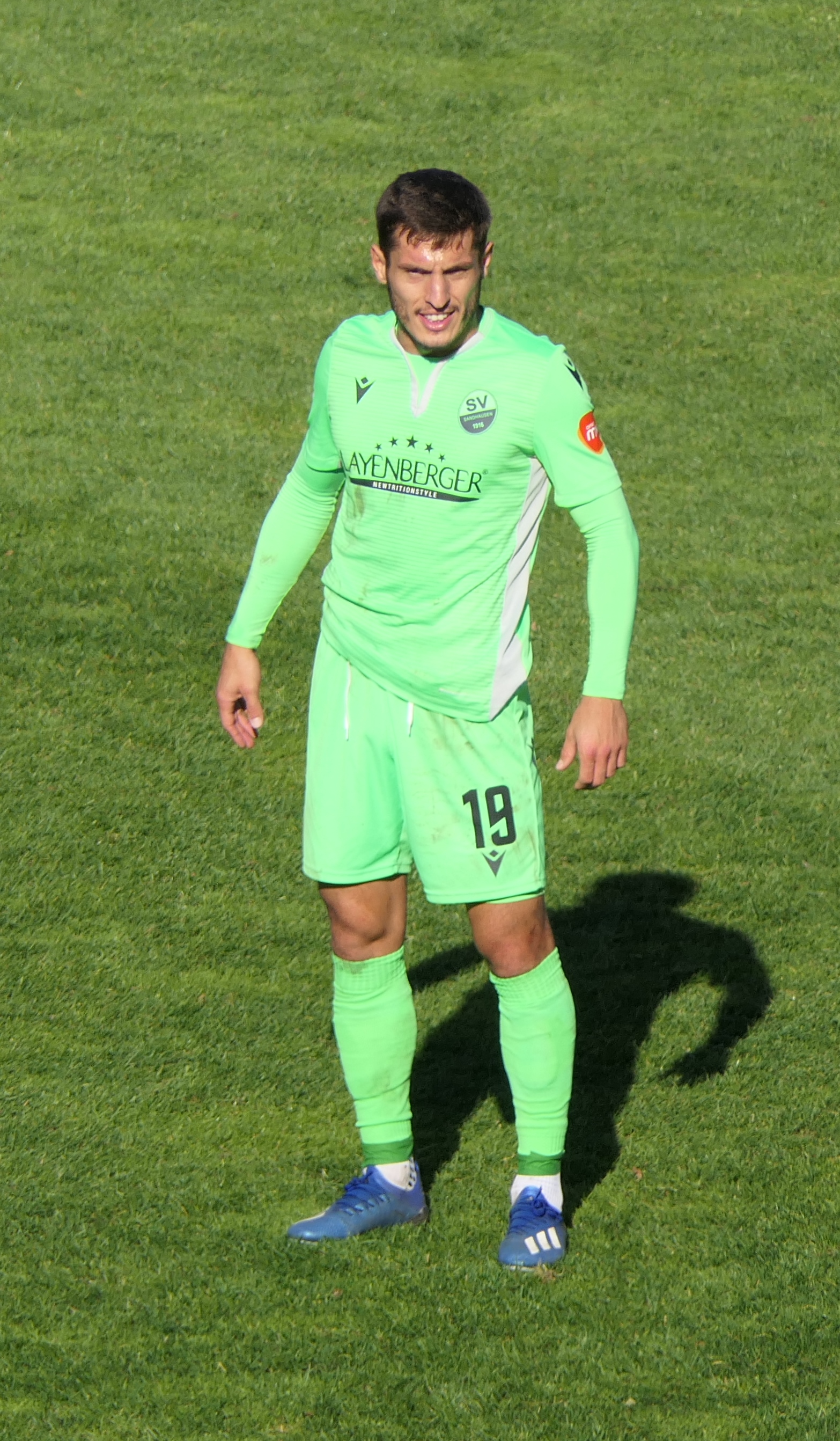
- Ajdini with SV Sandhausen in 2021

Personal information
- Date of birth: 10 December 1992 (age 33)
- Place of birth: Halmstad, Sweden
- Height: 1.78 m (5 ft 10 in)
- Position: Right-back

Youth career
- 1997–2011: SJC Hövelriege

Senior career*
Years	Team	Apps	(Gls)
2011–2015	Arminia Bielefeld II	82	(14)
2014–2015	Arminia Bielefeld	9	(0)
2015–2016	Sonnenhof Großaspach	31	(3)
2016–2021	VfL Osnabrück	142	(10)
2021–2023	SV Sandhausen	57	(3)
2023–2026	VfL Osnabrück	40	(1)
- * Club domestic league appearances and goals

Bashkim Ajdini (born 10 December 1992), previously known as Bashkim Renneke, is a former professional footballer who played as a right-back. Born in Sweden, he has chosen to represent the Kosovo national team.

== Club career ==
=== VfL Osnabrück ===
On 24 May 2016, Ajdini joined 3. Liga side VfL Osnabrück. On 31 July 2016, he made his debut in a 0–1 away win against Preußen Münster after coming on as a substitute at 58th minute in place of Jules Reimerink. Twenty-six days after debut, Ajdini scored his first goal for VfL Osnabrück in his second appearance for the club in a 4–2 away defeat over Werder Bremen II in 3. Liga.

=== SV Sandhausen ===
On 28 June 2021, Ajdini joined 2. Bundesliga side SV Sandhausen, to replace the injured Dennis Diekmeier as the second choice. On 25 July 2021, he made his debut in a 0–2 home defeat against Fortuna Düsseldorf after being named in the starting line-up.

=== Return to VfL Osnabrück ===
On 20 June 2023, Ajdini returned to VfL Osnabrück, shortly before promoted to 2. Bundesliga.

=== Retirement ===
On 7 May 2026, Ajdini announced his retirement.

== International career ==
Ajdini was eligible for Kosovo and Germany internationally, as well as Sweden, his birthplace. On 25 May 2021, he received a call-up from Kosovo for the friendly matches against San Marino and Malta, he was an unused substitute in these matches.

== Personal life ==
Ajdini was born in Halmstad, Sweden, where his parents had emigrated to escape the tensions of the Yugoslav Wars, and later settled in Schloß Holte-Stukenbrock, Germany. His family was deported back to Veliki Trnovac in August 2003, but he returned to Germany a year later after being adopted by a German family living in Hövelhof and taking their surname Renneke instead of his original surname Ajdini. On 5 March 2019, he re-took his birth surname "Ajdini".

== Honours ==
VfL Osnabrück

- 3. Liga: 2025–26
