= Robin Scheu (footballer) =

German footballer (born 1995)

Personal information
- Date of birth: 16 February 1995 (age 31)
- Place of birth: Offenbach am Main, Germany
- Height: 1.78 m (5 ft 10 in)
- Position: Right midfielder

Youth career
- TSG Neu-Isenburg
- –2014: Kickers Offenbach

Senior career*
Years	Team	Apps	(Gls)
2014–2016	Kickers Offenbach II	15	(2)
2014–2017	Kickers Offenbach	50	(9)
2017–2019	Fortuna Köln	61	(9)
2019–2021	SV Sandhausen	42	(3)
2021–2023	1. FC Saarbrücken	34	(2)
- * Club domestic league appearances and goals as of 27 May 2023

Robin Scheu (born 16 February 1995) is a German professional footballer who plays as a right midfielder.

== Career ==
On 21 June 2021, Scheu signed a two-year contract with 1. FC Saarbrücken.
