= Daniel Keita-Ruel =

German footballer (born 1989)

Personal information
- Date of birth: 21 September 1989 (age 37)
- Place of birth: Wuppertal, West Germany
- Height: 1.85 m (6 ft 1 in)
- Position: Centre-forward

Youth career
- 1995–2006: Wuppertaler SV
- 2006–2008: Borussia Mönchengladbach

Senior career*
Years	Team	Apps	(Gls)
2008–2009	Bonner SC	21	(3)
2009–2011	Wuppertaler SV	27	(0)
2014	Ratinger SV	12	(3)
2015–2016	Ratinger SV	32	(11)
2016–2017	SG Wattenscheid 09	33	(12)
2017–2018	Fortuna Köln	37	(15)
2018–2020	Greuther Fürth	59	(19)
2020–2022	SV Sandhausen	41	(13)
2022–2023	Waldhof Mannheim	23	(1)
- * Club domestic league appearances and goals as of 2 July 2023

Daniel Keita-Ruel (born 21 September 1989) is a German professional footballer who plays as a centre-forward.

== Career ==
As a youth Keita joined Borussia Mönchengladbach from hometown club Wuppertaler SV. Having left Mönchengladbach, he joined fifth-tier club Bonner SC before returning to Wuppertal, where he made few appearances for the club fighting relegation in 3. Liga.

Keita spent almost four years in prison, having been found guilty in four cases of robbery, three of them rated as aggravated robberies and the first of which occurred in summer 2011 when he was 21. In 2014, he was sent to an open prison in Düsseldorf, allowing him to play semi-professional football for Oberliga side Ratinger SV as day-release prisoner. In his time there, he scored 18 goals in 50 matches. In the 2016–17 season he netted 12 times for SG Wattenscheid 09 in the fourth-tier Regionalliga.

In May 2017, 3. Liga club Fortuna Köln announced the signing of Keita on a one-year contract with the option of another.

In June 2018, Keita-Ruel moved to SpVgg Greuther Fürth for the 2018–19 season.

Keita-Ruel joined 3. Liga club Waldhof Mannheim on 18 August 2022.

== Personal life ==
Keita was born in Germany to a Senegalese father and a French mother.

== Career statistics ==
As of 27 June 2024

Appearances and goals by club, season and competition
Club	Season	League			Cup		Other		Total	
Club	Season	Division	Apps	Goals	Apps	Goals	Apps	Goals	Apps	Goals
Wuppertaler SV	2009–10	3. Liga	7	0	0	0	–		7	0
Wuppertaler SV	2010–11	Regionalliga West	20	0	0	0	–		20	0
Wuppertaler SV	Total		27	0	0	0	0	0	27	0
SG Wattenscheid 09	2016–17	Regionalliga West	33	12	1	0	–		34	12
Fortuna Köln	2017–18	3. Liga	37	15	0	0	–		37	15
Greuther Fürth	2018–19	2. Bundesliga	30	10	1	0	–		31	10
Greuther Fürth	2019–20	2. Bundesliga	29	9	1	0	–		30	9
Greuther Fürth	Total		59	19	2	0	0	0	61	19
SV Sandhausen	2020–21	2. Bundesliga	31	12	2	0	–		33	12
SV Sandhausen	2021–22	2. Bundesliga	10	1	1	0	–		11	1
SV Sandhausen	Total		41	13	3	0	0	0	44	13
Waldhof Mannheim	2022–23	3. Liga	23	1	1	0	–		24	1
Career total			220	60	7	0	0	0	227	60
