= 2014–15 SG Sonnenhof Großaspach season =

SG Sonnenhof Großaspach
2014–15 season
- Chairman: Werner Benignus
- Manager: Rüdiger Rehm
- 3. Liga: 15th
| Home colours | Away colours |

The 2014–15 season saw SG Sonnenhof Großaspach compete in the 3. Liga, in which they finished 15th.

== Competitions ==
=== 3.Liga ===
==== League table ====
| Pos | Team | Pld | W | D | L | GF | GA | GD | Pts |
|---|---|---|---|---|---|---|---|---|---|
| 13 | VfB Stuttgart II (Note: Reserve teams are ineligible for promotion or DFB-Pokal qualification.) | 38 | 13 | 8 | 17 | 48 | 57 | −9 | 47 |
| 14 | Fortuna Köln | 38 | 12 | 10 | 16 | 38 | 47 | −9 | 46 |
| 15 | Sonnenhof Großaspach | 38 | 12 | 10 | 16 | 39 | 60 | −21 | 46 |
| 16 | Mainz 05 II | 38 | 10 | 12 | 16 | 43 | 52 | −9 | 42 |
| 17 | Hansa Rostock | 38 | 11 | 8 | 19 | 54 | 68 | −14 | 41 |

Source: DFB
Rules for classification: 1) Points; 2) Goal difference; 3) Goals scored

==== Matches ====
| 27 July 2014 1 | Sonnenhof Großaspach | 2–1 | SC Fortuna Köln | Aspach, Baden-Württemberg |
| 14:00 | Berger (yellow card) 13'; Rühle (yellow card) 32' (goal) 41'; Gehring (yellow card) 63'; Senesie 73' | Summary | Pazurek 21' (yellow card) 55' | Stadium: Mechatronik Arena; Attendance: 2,623; Referee: Christian Dietz |

| 2 August 2014 2 | MSV Duisburg | 1–1 | Sonnenhof Großaspach | Duisburg |
| 14:00 | Grote 2'; Schorch (yellow card) 53'; Schnellhardt (yellow card) 90' | Summary | Senesie 11'; Landeka (yellow card) 34' (yellow-red card); Simon Skarlatidis (yellow card) 43'; Vecchione (yellow card) 48'; Rühle (yellow card) 50'; Michele Rizzi (yellow card) 90' | Stadium: MSV-Arena; Attendance: 11,512; Referee: Florian Badstübner |

| 5 August 2014 3 | Sonnenhof Großaspach | 1–1 | Stuttgarter Kickers | Aspach, Baden-Württemberg |
| 19:00 | Jüllich (yellow card) 10'; Simon Skarlatidis (yellow card) 28'; Michele Rizzi 45+1'; Gehring (yellow card) 85'; Rühle (yellow card) 89' | Summary | Fennell (yellow card) 39'; Soriano 41'; Halimi (yellow card) 50' | Stadium: Mechatronik Arena; Attendance: 6,421; Referee: Harm Osmers |

| 9 August 2014 4 | SpVgg Unterhaching | 3–1 | Sonnenhof Großaspach | Unterhaching |
| 14:00 | Erb 42' (pen.); Haas (yellow card) 54'; Voglsammer 62'; Köpke 68'; Schwarz (yellow card) 75' | Summary | Pascal Sohm 18' (yellow card) 49'; Kunz (yellow card) 40'; Leist (yellow card) 89' | Stadium: Sportpark Unterhaching; Attendance: 2,800; Referee: Franz Bokop |

| 22 August 2014 5 | Sonnenhof Großaspach | 0–0 | Borussia Dortmund II | Aspach, Baden-Württemberg |
| 19:00 | Jüllich (yellow card) 57'; Hägele (yellow card) 76' | Summary | Solga (yellow card) 5'; Güll (yellow card) 14'; Hornschuh (yellow card) 61' (yellow-red card) | Stadium: Mechatronik Arena; Attendance: 1,934; Referee: Matthias Jöllenbeck |

| 26 August 2014 6 | Hansa Rostock | 1–3 | Sonnenhof Großaspach | Rostock |
| 19:00 | Dennis Srbeny 24'; Bickel (yellow card) 75' | Summary | Pascal Sohm 5'; Senesie 8'; Robin Krauße 48' (o.g.); Kunz (yellow card) 77' | Stadium: DKB-Arena; Attendance: 8,000; Referee: Lasse Koslowski |

| 30 August 2014 7 | Sonnenhof Großaspach | 3–3 | VfB Stuttgart II | Aspach, Baden-Württemberg |
| 14:00 | Simon Skarlatidis 12'; Michele Rizzi (yellow card) 29'; Senesie 72'; Pascal Sohm (yellow card) 81'; Landeka (yellow card) 82'; Sebastian Schiek 84' | Summary | Baumgartl (yellow card) 15' (goal) 61'; Yalçın (yellow card) 19'; Leibold 30'; Rathgeb (yellow card) 50'; Breier 58' | Stadium: Mechatronik Arena; Attendance: 4,500; Referee: Stefan Treiber |

| 13 September 2014 9 | Sonnenhof Großaspach | 1–3 | Dynamo Dresden | Aspach, Baden-Württemberg |
| 14:00 | Shiprim Binakaj (yellow card) 14'; Michele Rizzi 36' | Summary | Hefele (yellow card) 4'; Eilers 25' 90'; Comvalius 57' | Stadium: Mechatronik Arena; Attendance: 7,329; Referee: Benjamin Cortus |

| 16 September 2014 8 | Energie Cottbus | 2–0 | Sonnenhof Großaspach | Cottbus |
| 18:30 | Mattuschka (yellow card) 41'; Pospěch 44' 51'; Elsner (yellow card) 67' | Summary | Pascal Sohm (yellow card) 24'; Jüllich (yellow card) 38'; Michele Rizzi (yellow card) 79' | Stadium: Stadion der Freudschaft; Attendance: 7,419; Referee: Steffen Mix |

| 20 September 2014 10 | SC Preußen Münster | 3–1 | Sonnenhof Großaspach | Münster |
| 14:00 | Kara 5'; Bischoff (red card) 25'; Schöneberg (yellow card) 34'; Schmidt (yellow card) 54'; Reichwein 58' (pen.); Krohne 90+4' | Summary | Michele Rizzi 26' (pen.) (yellow card) 29'; Landeka (yellow card) 39'; Kunz (yellow card) 57'; Leist (yellow card) 88'; Shiprim Binakaj (yellow card) 90+4' | Stadium: Preußenstadion; Attendance: 7,385; Referee: Felix Schwermer |

| 24 September 2014 11 | Sonnenhof Großaspach | 1–1 | FC Rot-Weiß Erfurt | Aspach, Baden-Württemberg |
| 19:00 | Vecchione (yellow card) 38'; Michele Rizzi 40' (pen.) (red card) 90'; Jüllich (yellow card) 46'; David Kienast (yellow card) 72' | Summary | Kleineheismann (yellow card) 61' (yellow-red card); Aydın 89'; Tyrała (yellow card) 90+3' | Stadium: Mechatronik Arena; Attendance: 1,202; Referee: Soren Storks |

| 27 September 2014 12 | Holstein Kiel | 3–1 | Sonnenhof Großaspach | Kiel |
| 14:00 | Wirlmann 19'; Heider 22'; Kazior 47' | Summary | Landeka (yellow card) 57'; Gehring (yellow card) 65'; Schiek 87' | Stadium: Holstein-Stadion; Attendance: 3,698; Referee: Lasse Koslowski |

| 5 October 2014 13 | Sonnenhof Großaspach | 0–3 | Wehen Wiesbaden | Aspach, Baden-Württemberg |
| 14:00 | David Kienast (red card) 78'; Shiprim Binakaj (yellow card) 90'; Cimander (yellow card) 90+1' | Summary | Geyer (yellow card) 16'; Vunguidica 33'; Book 67'; Benyamina 80' | Stadium: Mechatronik Arena; Attendance: 1,089; Referee: Benedikt Kempkes |

| 18 October 2014 14 | SSV Jahn Regensburg | 2–0 | Sonnenhof Großaspach | Regensburg |
| 14:00 | Franziskus 15'; Hesse (yellow card) 50'; Kurz 84'; Matthias Dürmeyer (yellow card) 88' | Summary | Jüllich (yellow card) 30'; Michele Rizzi (yellow card) 78' | Stadium: Jahnstadion; Attendance: 2,723; Referee: Thorben Siewer |

| 25 October 2014 15 | VfL Osnabrück | 2–0 | Sonnenhof Großaspach | Osnabrück |
| 14:00 | Thee 18'; Pisot (yellow card) 62'; Ornatelli (yellow card) 65'; Menga 87' | Summary | Gehring (yellow card) 30'; Pascal Sohm (yellow card) 72' | Stadium: Stadion an der Bremer Brücke; Attendance: 7,307; Referee: Johannes Huber |

| 31 October 2014 16 | Sonnenhof Großaspach | 3–1 | 1. FSV Mainz 05 II | Aspach, Baden-Württemberg |
| 19:00 CET | Fischer 28'; Shiprim Binakaj 47'; Vecchione (yellow card) 61'; Berger (yellow card) 67'; Simon Skarlatidis 88' | Summary | Todor Nedelev 42'; Weil (yellow card) 80' | Stadium: Mechatronik Arena; Attendance: 2,314; Referee: Sven Waschitizki |

| 8 November 2014 17 | Hallescher FC | 0–2 | Sonnenhof Großaspach | Halle |
| 14:00 CET | | | Landeka (yellow card) 15'; Michele Rizzi (yellow card) 76'; Cidimar 87'; Simon Skarlatidis 90+2' | Stadium: Erdgas Sportpark; Attendance: 6,033; Referee: Thorsten Schriever |

| 22 November 2014 18 | Sonnenhof Großaspach | 1–0 | Chemnitzer FC | Aspach, Baden-Württemberg |
| 14:00 | Hägele (yellow card) 23'; Fischer 55' (yellow card) 65'; Simon Skarlatidis (yellow card) 82' | Summary | Scheffel (yellow card) 20' (yellow-red card); Philip Türpitz (yellow card) 35'; Hofrath (yellow card) 42'; Poggenberg (yellow card) 65' | Stadium: Mechatronik Arena; Attendance: 2,003; Referee: Florian Heft |

| 28 November 2014 19 | Arminia Bielefeld | 2–0 | Sonnenhof Großaspach | Bielefeld |
| 19:00 | Klos 9'; Schütz (yellow card) 60'; Schuppan 81' | Summary | Rühle (yellow card) 75' | Stadium: Bielefelder Alm; Attendance: 10,729; Referee: Franz Bokop |

| 6 December 2014 20 | SC Fortuna Köln | 4–0 | Sonnenhof Großaspach | Cologne |
| 14:00 | Kusi Kwame (yellow card) 10'; Hamdi Dahmani (yellow card) 22'; Rahn 31'; Michael Kessel (yellow card) 58' (goal) 67'; Fink (yellow card) 69'; Kialka 84'; Cauly 90+3' | Summary | Fischer (yellow card) 41'; Berger (yellow card) 59'; Gehring (yellow card) 63'; Cidimar (yellow card) 85' | Stadium: Südstadion; Attendance: 948; Referee: Lasse Koslowski |

| 13 December 2014 21 | Sonnenhof Großaspach | 1–1 | MSV Duisburg | Aspach, Baden-Württemberg |
| 14:00 | Michele Rizzi 17' (pen.); Schuster (yellow card) 28'; Jüllich (yellow card) 68'; Shiprim Binakaj (yellow card) 70'; Schiek (yellow card) 81' | Summary | Meißner (yellow card) 16'; Janjić 27'; Hajri (yellow card) 75' | Stadium: Mechatronik Arena; Attendance: 2,378; Referee: Johannes Huber |

| 20 December 2014 22 | Stuttgarter Kickers | 2–0 | Sonnenhof Großaspach | Reutlingen |
| 14:00 | Braun 30'; Engelbrecht 79' | Summary | Jüllich (yellow card) 38' (yellow-red card); Michele Rizzi (yellow card) 67' | Stadium: Stadion an der Kreuzeiche; Attendance: 3,160; Referee: Florian Badstübner |

| 31 January 2015 23 | Sonnenhof Großaspach | v | SpVgg Unterhaching | Aspach, Baden-Württemberg |
| 14:00 | | | | Stadium: Mechatronik Arena |

| 7 February 2015 24 | Borussia Dortmund II | v | Sonnenhof Großaspach | Dortmund |
| 14:00 | | | | Stadium: Stadion Rote Erde |

| 14 February 2015 25 | Sonnenhof Großaspach | 1–1 | Hansa Rostock | Aspach, Baden-Württemberg |
| 14:00 | Mirko Schuster (yellow card) 71'; Rühle 74' (yellow card) 82'; Aupperle (red card) 90' | Summary | Ruprecht 21'; Kofler (yellow card) 44' | Stadium: Mechatronik Arena; Attendance: 2,259; Referee: Patrick Schult |

| 21 February 2015 26 | VfB Stuttgart II | 4–1 | Sonnenhof Großaspach | Stuttgart |
| 14:00 | Haggui (yellow card) 27' (goal) 42'; Leibold (yellow card) 30'; Wanitzek (yellow card) 66'; Daniel Cinczek 69' 71' (yellow card) 74'; Breier 81' | Summary | Morys (yellow card) 5'; Rühle 65'; Schiek (yellow card) 79' | Stadium: Gazi-Stadion auf der Waldau; Attendance: 950; Referee: Benjamin Cortus |

| 24 February 2015 23 | Sonnenhof Großaspach | 1–4 | SpVgg Unterhaching | Aspach, Baden-Württemberg |
| 19:00 | Mirko Schuster (yellow card) 5'; Rühle 10' | Summary | Damian Gaska 17'; Götze (yellow card) 48' (goal) 62'; Köpke 52'; Widemann 55' | Stadium: Mechatronik Arena; Attendance: 600; Referee: Christian Bandurski |

| 28 February 2015 27 | Sonnenhof Großaspach | 2–2 | Energie Cottbus | Aspach, Baden-Württemberg |
| 14:00 | Michele Rizzi 32' (pen.); Morys (yellow card) 43'; David Kienast (yellow card) 50'; Gehring 75' (yellow card) 88' | Summary | Müller (yellow card) 31'; Möhrle (yellow card) 43' (goal) 65'; Hübener (yellow card) 57'; Perdedaj (yellow card) 74'; Cédric Mimbala 84' | Stadium: Mechatronik Arena; Attendance: 1,600; Referee: Patrick Alt |

| 7 March 2015 28 | Dynamo Dresden | 0–1 | Sonnenhof Großaspach | Dresden |
| 14:00 | Erdmann (yellow card) 64' (yellow-red card) | Summary | Gehring (yellow card) 60'; Morys 67' (yellow card) 86' | Stadium: Glücksgas Stadium; Attendance: 28,144; Referee: Robert Schröder |

| 11 March 2015 24 | Borussia Dortmund II | 0–1 | Sonnenhof Großaspach | Dortmund |
| 19:00 | Solga (yellow card) 11'; Kefkir (red card) 41' | Summary | Michele Rizzi 41' (pen.) (yellow card) 70'; Jüllich (yellow card) 47'; Rühle (yellow card) 81' | Stadium: Stadion Rote Erde; Attendance: 2,019; Referee: Franz Bokop |

| 14 March 2015 29 | Sonnenhof Großaspach | 1–1 | Preußen Münster | Aspach, Baden-Württemberg |
| 14:00 | Morys (yellow card) 21'; Gehring (yellow card) 45'; Simon Skarlatidis 77' | Summary | Bischoff (yellow card) 18'; Schmidt 31' (yellow card) 85' | Stadium: Mechatronik Arena; Attendance: 1,900; Referee: Alexander Sather |

| 21 March 2015 30 | Rot-Weiß Erfurt | 0–1 | Sonnenhof Großaspach | Erfurt |
| 14:00 | Aydın (yellow card) 68'; Kammlott (yellow card) 69' | Summary | Rühle (yellow card) 30'; Gehring (yellow card) 74'; Mirko Schuster (yellow card) 83'; Senesie 90' | Stadium: Steigerwaldstadion; Attendance: 4,195; Referee: Florian Badstübner |

| 4 April 2015 31 | Sonnenhof Großaspach | 1–1 | Holstein Kiel | Aspach |
| 14:00 CEST | Rizzi 37' | Report | 2' Heider | Stadium: Mechatronik Arena; Attendance: 1,500; Referee: Steffen Mix |

| 11 April 2015 32 | Wehen Wiesbaden | 0–1 | Sonnenhof Großaspach | Wiesbaden |
| 14:00 CEST | | Report | 63' Senesie | Stadium: BRITA-Arena; Attendance: 2,077; Referee: Thorben Siewer |

| 18 April 2015 33 | Sonnenhof Großaspach | 2–1 | Jahn Regensburg | Aspach |
| 14:00 CEST | Gehring 25'; Rizzi 88' | Report | 27' Königs | Stadium: Mechatronik Arena; Attendance: 1,900; Referee: Lasse Koslowski |

| 24 April 2015 34 | Sonnenhof Großaspach | 1–0 | VfL Osnabrück | Aspach |
| 19:00 CEST | Aupperle 84' | Report | | Stadium: Mechatronik Arena; Attendance: 1,800; Referee: Daniel Schlager |

| 2 May 2015 35 | Mainz 05 II | 3–1 | Sonnenhof Großaspach | Magonza |
| 14:00 CEST | Ihrig 20'; Klement 34'; Parker 79' | Report | 45' Hägele | Stadium: Stadion am Bruchweg; Attendance: 746; Referee: Marcel Göpferich |

| 10 May 2015 36 | Sonnenhof Großaspach | 2–1 | Hallescher FC | Aspach |
| 14:00 CEST | Gehring 77'; Rizzi 84' (pen.) | Report | 45' Kruse | Stadium: Mechatronik Arena; Attendance: 1,500; Referee: Sven Waschitzki-Günther |

| 16 May 2015 37 | Chemnitzer FC | 2–0 | Sonnenhof Großaspach | Chemnitz |
| 13:30 CEST | Binakaj 55' (o.g.); Cincotta 88' | Report | | Stadium: Stadion an der Gellertstraße; Attendance: 6,081; Referee: Felix-Benjamin Schwermer |

| 23 May 2015 38 | Sonnenhof Großaspach | 0–1 | Arminia Bielefeld | Aspach |
| 13:30 CEST | | Report | 76' Müller | Stadium: Mechatronik Arena; Attendance: 3,500; Referee: Alexander Sather |
