= 2008–09 Stuttgarter Kickers season =

Stuttgarter Kickers
2008–09 season
- Chairman: Dirk Eichelbaum
- Manager: Stefan Minkwitz (Aug. until Sep.); Edgar Schmitt (Sep. until Apr.); Edgar Schmitt (Apr. until Jun.)
- Stadium: Gazi-Stadion auf der Waldau, Stuttgart, BW
- 3. Liga: 20th
- Wurttemberg Cup: Round of 16
- Top goalscorer: League: Gambo & Vaccaro (5); All: Vaccaro (7)
- Highest home attendance: 6,070 vs. Dynamo Dresden, 11 November 2008
- Lowest home attendance: 2,500 vs. Werder Bremen II, 7 December 2008
| Home colours | Away colours |

The 2008–09 Stuttgarter Kickers season was the 109th season in the club's football history. In 2008–09 the club played in the new founded 3. Liga, the third tier of German football. The club also has taken part in the 2008–09 edition of the Wurttemberg Cup.

Stuttgarter Kickers finished 20th (and last) in the league table.

== Squad information ==
=== Squad and statistics ===
Squad Season 2008–09
| No. | Player | Nat. | Birthdate | at Kickers since | previous club | 3. Liga | | Wurttemberg Cup | |
| No. | Player | Nat. | Birthdate | at Kickers since | previous club | App | Gls | App | Gls |
Goalkeepers
| 1 | Manuel Salz | (Germany) | 6 August 1985 | 2003 | Junior Team | 38 | 0 | 3 | 0 |
| 25 | Benjamin Huber | (Germany) | 27 August 1985 | 1994 | FC Ingolstadt 04 | 1 | 0 | 1 | 0 |
Defenders
| 2 | Moritz Steinle | (Germany) | 14 February 1983 | 1990 | Junior Team | 16 | 0 | 0 | 0 |
| 3 | Jens Härter | (Germany) | 19 December 1979 | 2004 | SGV Freiberg | 22 | 1 | 2 | 0 |
| 4 | Torsten Traub | (Germany) | 8 September 1975 | 2009 | VfR Aalen | 18 | 1 | 0 | 0 |
| 5 | Saša Janić | (Germany) | 7 May 1975 | 2008 | SSV Reutlingen 05 | 6 | 0 | 2 | 0 |
| 12 | Dirk Dittrich | (Germany) | 29 January 1986 | 2009 | Richmond Kickers Future | 0 | 0 | 0 | 0 |
| 15 | Marcel Rapp | (Germany) | 16 April 1979 | 2007 | SC Pfullendorf | 12 | 0 | 2 | 0 |
| 16 | Simon Köpf | (Germany) | 25 March 1987 | 2009 | VfR Aalen | 9 | 0 | 0 | 0 |
| 17 | Benedikt Deigendesch | (Germany) | 15 September 1985 | 2007 | 1. FC Nürnberg II | 30 | 2 | 1 | 0 |
| 38 | Thomas Gentner | (Germany) | 4 October 1988 | 2007 | Junior Team | 18 | 0 | 0 | 0 |
Midfielders
| 6 | Josip Landeka | (Croatia) | 1 June 1968 | 2008 | 1. FSV Mainz 05 II | 23 | 3 | 1 | 0 |
| 10 | Bashiru Gambo | (Ghana) | 24 September 1978 | 2004 | Wydad AC Casablanca | 33 | 5 | 3 | 0 |
| 13 | Jörn Schmiedel | (Germany) | 13 September 1978 | 2008 | SSV Reutlingen 05 | 3 | 0 | 0 | 0 |
| 14 | Mustafa Parmak | (Turkey) | 19 May 1982 | 2009 | TuS Koblenz | 8 | 0 | 0 | 0 |
| 20 | Alexander Rosen | (Germany) | 10 April 1979 | 2007 | Follo FK | 30 | 2 | 0 | 0 |
| 24 | Thorsten Reiß | (Germany) | 11 August 1984 | 2008 | FSV Oggersheim | 18 | 0 | 3 | 0 |
| 25 | Ralf Kettemann | (Germany) | 20 August 1986 | 2008 | Junior Team | 14 | 0 | 3 | 1 |
| 26 | Marko Kovač | (Croatia) | 6 January 1987 | 2005 | Junior Team | 1 | 0 | 2 | 0 |
| 27 | Franco Petruso | (Italy) | 18 August 1988 | 2001 | Junior Team | 2 | 0 | 0 | 0 |
| 33 | Sascha Traut | (Germany) | 21 May 1985 | 2008 | TuS Koblenz | 35 | 2 | 3 | 2 |
| 36 | Marcel Ivanusa | (Slovenia) | 16 January 1985 | 1996 | Junior Team | 5 | 0 | 0 | 0 |
Forwards
| 7 | Michael Schürg | (Germany) | 21 October 1984 | 2008 | SSV Ulm 1846 | 26 | 4 | 3 | 1 |
| 9 | Orlando Smeekes | (Netherlands Antilles) | 28 December 1981 | 2008 | Go Ahead Eagles | 29 | 4 | 0 | 0 |
| 11 | Marco Tucci | (Italy) | 2 May 1985 | 2000 | Junior Team | 19 | 1 | 3 | 1 |
| 16 | Gino Russo | (Italy) | 22 November 1985 | 2008 | SG Sonnenhof Großaspach | 0 | 0 | 0 | 0 |
| 18 | Danny Galm | (Germany) | 17 March 1986 | 2009 | FC Energie Cottbus II | 14 | 3 | 0 | 0 |
| 19 | Sokol Kacani | (Albania) | 16 February 1984 | 2008 | FC Rot-Weiß Erfurt | 10 | 0 | 3 | 4 |
| 32 | Dirk Prediger | (Germany) | 23 January 1987 | 2007 | Junior Team | 8 | 1 | 3 | 2 |
| 42 | Mijo Tunjic | (Netherlands) | 2 February 1988 | 2006 | Junior Team | 6 | 2 | 0 | 0 |
| 47 | Gökhan Gümüşsu | (Turkey) | 17 February 1989 | 2002 | Junior Team | 2 | 0 | 0 | 0 |
Players transferred out during the season
| 18 | Angelo Vaccaro | (Italy) | 4 October 1981 | 2007 | FC Augsburg | 15 | 5 | 3 | 2 |
| 22 | Şaban Genişyürek | (Turkey) | 3 January 1986 | 2007 | FV Illertissen | 0 | 0 | 1 | 1 |

== Reserve team ==
Kickers' reserve team finished 7th in the Oberliga Baden-Württemberg and were coached by Björn Hinck.

Note: Flags indicate national team as defined under FIFA eligibility rules; some limited exceptions apply. Players may hold more than one non-FIFA nationality.

| No. | Pos. | Nation | Player |
|---|---|---|---|
| — | GK | POR | Luis Rodrigues |
| — | GK | GER | Julian Hauser |
| — | DF | GER | Tobias Müller |
| — | DF | GRE | Ioannis Tsapakidis |
| — | DF | ITA | Alessandro Abruscia |
| — | DF | GER | Eugen Schneider |
| — | DF | USA | Royal-Dominique Fennell |
| — | DF | GER | Tobias Weber |
| — | DF | GER | Moritz Steinle |
| — | MF | GER | Maikel Boric |
| — | MF | GER | Thomas Gentner |
| — | MF | TUR | Burhan Degirmenci |

| No. | Pos. | Nation | Player |
|---|---|---|---|
| — | MF | SLO | Marcel Ivanusa |
| — | MF | GER | Demis Jung |
| — | MF | GER | Markus Kärcher |
| — | MF | CRO | Marko Kovač |
| — | MF | TUR | Ali Pala |
| — | MF | ITA | Andre Olveira |
| — | MF | ITA | Franco Petruso |
| — | MF | ITA | Michele Rizzi |
| — | FW | GER | Dennis Förster |
| — | FW | TUR | Gökhan Gümüşsu |
| — | FW | NED | Mijo Tunjic |
| — | FW | NED | Antonio Tunjic |
