= 2012–13 SV Wacker Burghausen season =

Wacker Burghausen
2012–13 season
- Stadium: Wacker Arena
- 3. Liga: 8th
- DFB-Pokal: First round
- Bavarian Cup: Final

The 2012–13 SV Wacker Burghausen season is the 83rd season in club history. The season started on 21 July 2012 and will finish on 18 May 2013. The club is participating in the 3. Liga, DFB-Pokal and Bavarian Cup. They play their home matches at Wacker Arena.

== Review and events ==
The 2012–13 SV Wacker Burghausen season started on 21 July 2012 with a home loss to Preußen Münster and will end at home on 18 May 2013 against Arminia Bielefeld. The club is the participating in the 3. Liga, DFB-Pokal and Bavarian Cup.

== Competitions ==
=== 3. Liga ===
==== League table ====
| Pos | Team | Pld | W | D | L | GF | GA | GD | Pts |
|---|---|---|---|---|---|---|---|---|---|
| 6 | Chemnitzer FC | 38 | 15 | 10 | 13 | 56 | 47 | +9 | 55 |
| 7 | SV Wehen Wiesbaden | 38 | 11 | 18 | 9 | 51 | 51 | 0 | 51 |
| 8 | Wacker Burghausen | 38 | 14 | 9 | 15 | 45 | 45 | 0 | 51 |
| 9 | SpVgg Unterhaching | 38 | 14 | 9 | 15 | 48 | 55 | −7 | 51 |
| 10 | Hallescher FC | 38 | 12 | 10 | 16 | 37 | 50 | −13 | 46 |

Source: kicker
Rules for classification: 1) points; 2) goal difference; 3) number of goals scored.

==== Matches ====
| Match | Date | League position | Opponent | Venue | Result (Note: Wacker Burghausen goals first.) | Scorers | Attendance | Ref. |
|---|---|---|---|---|---|---|---|---|
| 1 | 21 July 2012 – 14:00 | 19th | Preußen Münster | Home | 0–2 | — | 3,000 | |
| 2 | 28 July 2012 – 14:00 | 18th | Alemannia Aachen | Away | 2–3 | Çınar 61', Holz 90+2' | 15,562 | |
| 3 | 4 August 2012 – 14:00 | 14th | Chemnitzer FC | Home | 2–1 | Mokhtari 70' (pen.), Senesie 83' | 2,600 | |
| 4 | 7 August 2012 – 19:00 | 17th | Borussia Dortmund II | Away | 1–2 | Eberlein 78' | 2,250 | |
| 5 | 11 August 2012 – 14:00 | 13th | Darmstadt 98 | Home | 1–0 | Thiel 88' | 2,410 | |
| 6 | 25 August 2012 – 14:00 | 15th | 1. FC Saarbrücken | Away | 0–3 | — | 3,405 | |
| 7 | 29 August 2012 – 19:00 | 11th | Hansa Rostock | Home | 2–0 | Schwarz 41', Schmidt 81' | 2,850 | |
| 8 | 1 September 2012 – 14:00 | 15th | Kickers Offenbach | Away | 0–1 | — | 5,861 | |
| 9 | 15 September 2012 – 14:00 | 15th | Wehen Wiesbaden | Home | 0–0 | — | 2,300 | |
| 10 | 22 September 2012 – 14:00 | 11th | Karlsruher SC | Away | 2–1 | Eberlein 25', Senesie 78' | 10,635 | |
| 11 | 26 September 2012 – 19:00 | 7th | 1. FC Heidenheim | Home | 4–1 | Aupperle 37', Luz 39', Kulabas 74', Thiel 89' | 2,300 | |
| 12 | 29 September 2012 – 14:00 | 6th | Rot-Weiß Erfurt | Away | 3–0 | Luz 19', 70', Senesie 89' | 4,030 | |
| 13 | 6 October 2012 – 14:00 | 6th | Hallescher FC | Home | 2–0 | Aupperle 69', Kulabas 87' | 2,750 | |
| 14 | 20 October 2012 – 14:00 | 5th | Stuttgarter Kickers | Away | 2–1 | Thiel 30', Holz 73' | 3,575 | |
| 15 | 27 October 2012 – 14:00 | 5th | VfB Stuttgart II | Home | 1–3 | Thiel 46' | 2,200 | |
| 16 | 2 November 2012 – 19:00 | 8th | SpVgg Unterhaching | Away | 0–3 | — | 3,300 | |
| 17 | 10 November 2012 – 14:00 | 8th | VfL Osnabrück | Home | 1–1 | Thiel 63' | 2,460 | |
| 18 | 17 November 2012 – 14:00 | 6th | Babelsberg 03 | Home | 3–1 | Senesie 8', Mokhtari 18' (pen.), Schwarz 22' | 2,200 | |
| 19 | 24 November 2012 – 14:00 | 7th | Arminia Bielefeld | Away | 0–3 | — | 6,451 | |
| 20 | 1 December 2012 – 14:00 | 8th | Preußen Münster | Away | 0–2 | — | 5,667 | |
| 22 | 15 December 2012 – 14:00 | 9th | Chemnitzer FC | Away | 1–2 | Holz 48' | 3,300 | |
| 23 | 26 January 2013 – 14:00 | 8th | Borussia Dortmund II | Home | 2–2 | Schwarz 17', Thiel 84' | 2,150 | |
| 24 | 2 February 2013 – 14:00 | 8th | Darmstadt 98 | Away | 0–0 | — | 4,100 | |
| 25 | 9 February 2013 – 14:00 | 8th | 1. FC Saarbrücken | Home | 2–1 | Çınar 32', Thiel 61' | 2,000 | |
| 28 | 2 March 2013 – 14:00 | 8th | Wehen Wiesbaden | Away | 1–1 | Holz 2' | 2,104 | |
| 26 | 6 March 2013 – 19:00 (Note: Match postponed and rearranged due to adverse weather conditions.) | 8th | Hansa Rostock | Away | 0–1 | — | 7,000 | |
| 29 | 9 March 2013 – 14:00 | 10th | Karlsruher SC | Home | 1–2 | Mokhtari 22' | 3,020 | |
| 30 | 16 March 2013 – 14:00 | 10th | 1. FC Heidenheim | Away | 1–2 | Mokhtari 43' | 7,300 | |
| 21 | 23 March 2013 – 14:00 (Note: Match originally due to be played at 14:00 on 8 December 2012, but postponed due to adverse weather conditions.) | 8th | Alemannia Aachen | Home | 2–0 | Luz 17', Strujić 35' (o.g.) | 2,500 | |
| 27 | 26 March 2013 – 19:00 (Note: Match postponed and rearranged due to adverse weather conditions.) | 8th | Kickers Offenbach | Home | 0–0 | — | 1,800 | |
| 31 | 30 March 2013 – 14:00 | 8th | Rot-Weiß Erfurt | Home | 0–0 | — | 2,150 | |
| 32 | 6 April 2013 – 14:00 | 9th | Hallescher FC | Away | 0–0 | — | 5,448 | |
| 33 | 13 April 2013 – 14:00 | 9th | Stuttgarter Kickers | Home | 1–4 | Çınar 29' | 2,200 | |
| 34 | 20 April 2013 – 14:00 | 11th | VfB Stuttgart II | Away | 0–0 | — | 460 | |
| 35 | 27 April 2013 – 14:00 | 9th | SpVgg Unterhaching | Home | 3–1 | Schröck 31', Luz 41', Thiel 82' | 2,400 | |
| 36 | 4 May 2013 – 14:00 | 9th | VfL Osnabrück | Away | 0–1 | — | 10,100 | |
| 37 | 11 May 2013 – 13:30 | 9th | Babelsberg 03 | Away | 4–0 | Müller 14', Thiel 57', Çınar 76', Holz 77' | 2,703 | |
| 38 | 18 May 2013 – 13:30 | 8th | Arminia Bielefeld | Home | 1–0 | Thiel 52' | 3,200 | |

=== DFB-Pokal ===
| Date | Round | Venue | Opponent | Result | Scorers | Attendance | Ref. |
|---|---|---|---|---|---|---|---|
| 19 August 2012 – 18:30 | First round | Home | Fortuna Düsseldorf | 0–1 | — | 4,000 | |

=== Bavarian Cup ===
| Date | Round | Venue | Opponent | Result | Attendance | Ref. |
|---|---|---|---|---|---|---|
| 5 September 2012 – 18:00 | First round | Away | MTV Pfaffenhofen | 10–0 | | |
| 12 September 2012 – 17:45 | Second round | Away | FC Ismaning | 3–0 | 275 | |
| 3 October 2012 – 15:00 | Round of 16 | Away | ASV Cham | 4–1 | 750 | |
| 3 April 2013 – 17:45 | Quarter-final | Away | Würzburger FV | 2–0 | 550 | |
| 30 April 2013 – 18:30 | Semi-final | Away | Bayern Hof | 3–0 | 680 | |
| 9 May 2013 – 14:00 | Final | Away | 1860 Rosenheim | 2–2 (3–4 p) | 1,800 | |
