= Kim-Pascal Boysen =

German footballer

Personal information
- Full name: Kim-Pascal Boysen
- Date of birth: 19 June 1988 (age 38)
- Place of birth: Germany
- Height: 1.88 m (6 ft 2 in)
- Position: Forward

Team information
- Current team: SpVgg Fortuna Edingen

Youth career
- TSV Viernheim
- Waldhof Mannheim
- SV Sandhausen
- TSG Backnang

Senior career*
Years	Team	Apps	(Gls)
2008–2009	Kickers Offenbach II	11	(0)
2008–2009	Kickers Offenbach	1	(0)
2009–2010	ASV Durlach	3	(0)
- * Club domestic league appearances and goals

Kim-Pascal Boysen (born 19 June 1988) is a German former professional footballer who plays as a forward.

== Career ==
Boysen made his professional debut for Kickers Offenbach in the 3. Liga on 19 December 2008, matchday 20 of the 2008–09 season, coming on as a substitute for Matthias Morys in the 84th minute of the match against VfB Stuttgart II.

== Personal life ==
He is the son of Hans-Jürgen Boysen, who was head coach while Kim-Pascal was at Kickers Offenbach.
