= Schoeffler =

Schoeffler is a surname. Notable people with the surname include:

- Augustin Schoeffler (1822–1851), French saint and martyr
- Clifford Schoeffler (1924–2005), American general
- Paul Schoeffler (born 1958), Canadian actor

== See also ==
- Scheffler
