= Felice Vecchione =

Italian-German footballer

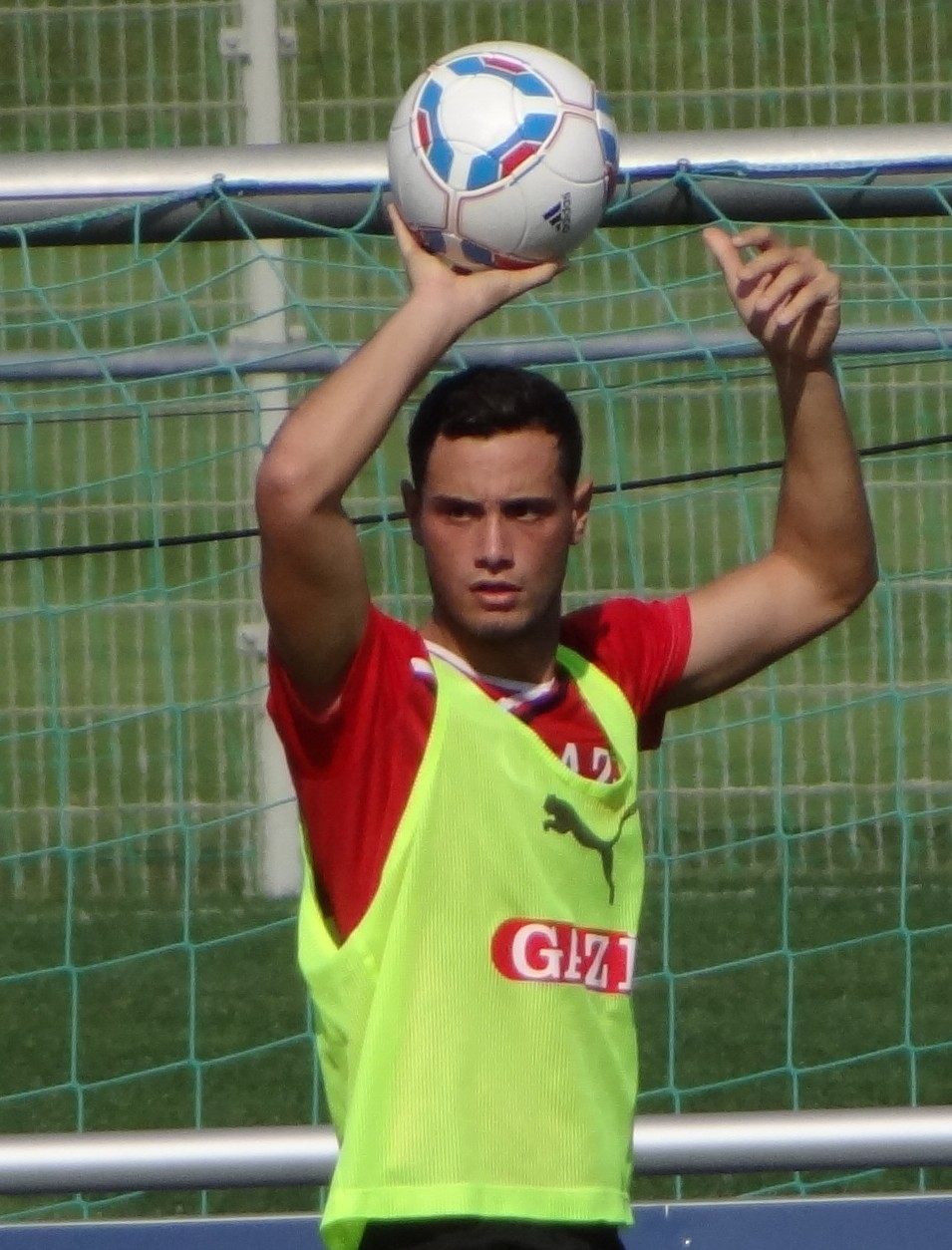

Personal information
- Date of birth: 22 January 1991 (age 35)
- Place of birth: Waiblingen, Germany
- Position: Midfielder

Youth career
- SV Fellbach
- FSV Waiblingen
- –2005: Stuttgarter Kickers
- 2005–2009: VfB Stuttgart

Senior career*
Years	Team	Apps	(Gls)
2009–2013	VfB Stuttgart II	84	(1)
2013–2016	Sonnenhof Großaspach	43	(0)
- * Club domestic league appearances and goals as of 05:41, 21 December 2016 (UTC)

Felice Vecchione (born 22 January 1991) is an Italian-German footballer who played for Sonnenhof Großaspach.
