= Josip Landeka =

Croatian former professional footballer (born 1987)

Personal information
- Full name: Josip Landeka
- Date of birth: 28 April 1987 (age 39)
- Place of birth: Offenbach, West Germany
- Height: 1.76 m (5 ft 9 in)

Youth career
- 1991–2000: Kickers Obertshausen
- 2000–2005: SG Rosenhöhe
- 2005–2006: Mainz 05

Senior career*
Years	Team	Apps	(Gls)
2006–2007	Mainz 05 II	55	(3)
2007–2008	Mainz 05	0	(0)
2008–2009	Stuttgarter Kickers	23	(3)
2009	Stuttgarter Kickers II	7	(0)
2009–2010	Wehen Wiesbaden	11	(0)
2010	Wehen Wiesbaden II	9	(0)
2010–2012	Carl Zeiss Jena	67	(2)
2012–2013	Chemnitzer FC	45	(3)
2013–2014	Darmstadt 98	10	(0)
2014–2016	Sonnenhof Großaspach	35	(2)
2016–2019	Stuttgarter Kickers	44	(2)
Total		306	(15)

International career
	Croatia U-19	6	(0)
- * Club domestic league appearances and goals

Josip Landeka (born 28 April 1987) is a retired professional footballer who played as midfielder. Born in Germany, he represented Croatia at under-19 international level.

== Early life ==
Landeka was born in Offenbach, West Germany on 20 April 1987.

== Club career ==
Landeka was with 1. FSV Mainz 05 II from July 2006 to June 2008. He scored two goals in 28 matches during the 2006–07 season and a goal in 27 matches during the 2007–08 season. He was with the first team for the 2007–08 season. However, he didn't make any appearances. He then joined Stuttgarter Kickers for the 2008–09 season. He scored three goals in 23 appearances. He then moved on a free transfer to Wehen Wiesbaden prior to the 2009–10 season. He failed to score any goals in 11 league appearances and one German Cup appearance. He also failed to score any goals in nine appearances for the reserve team.

== Career statistics ==
Appearances and goals by club, season and competition
Club	Season	League			Cup		Other		Total		Ref.
Club	Season	Division	Apps	Goals	Apps	Goals	Apps	Goals	Apps	Goals	Ref.
Mainz 05 II	2006–07	Oberliga Südwest	28	2	—		—		28	2	
Mainz 05 II	2007–08	Oberliga Südwest	27	1	—		—		27	1	
Mainz 05 II	Total		55	3	—		—		55	3	—
Stuttgarter Kickers	2008–09	3. Liga	23	3	—		—		23	3	
Wehen Wiesbaden	2009–10	3. Liga	11	0	1	0	—		12	0	
Wehen Wiesbaden II	2009–10	Regionalliga Süd	9	0	—		—		9	0	
Carl Zeiss Jena	2010–11	3. Liga	31	2	—		—		31	2	
Carl Zeiss Jena	2011–12	3. Liga	36	0	—		—		36	0	
Carl Zeiss Jena	Total		67	2	—		—		67	2	—
Chemnitzer FC	2012–13	3. Liga	37	3	1	0	—		38	3	
Chemnitzer FC	2013–14	3. Liga	8	0	—		—		8	0	
Chemnitzer FC	Total		45	3	1	0	—		46	3	—
Darmstadt 98	2013–14	3. Liga	10	0	0	0	1 (Note: Appearances in the Promotion playoff.)	0	11	0	
Sonnenhof Großaspach	2014–15	3. Liga	20	0	—		—		20	0	
Sonnenhof Großaspach	2015–16	3. Liga	11	1	—		—		11	1	
Sonnenhof Großaspach	2016–17	3. Liga	4	1	—		—		4	1	
Sonnenhof Großaspach	Total		35	2	—		—		35	2	—
Stuttgarter Kickers	2016–17	Regionalliga Südwest	12	2	—		—		12	2	
Stuttgarter Kickers	2017–18	Regionalliga Südwest	19	0	—		—		19	0	
Stuttgarter Kickers	2018–19	Oberliga Baden-Württemberg	13	0	—		1	0	14	0	
Stuttgarter Kickers	Total		44	2	—		1	0	45	2	—
Career total			299	15	2	0	2	0	303	15	—
