= Ali Pala =

Turkish-German footballer

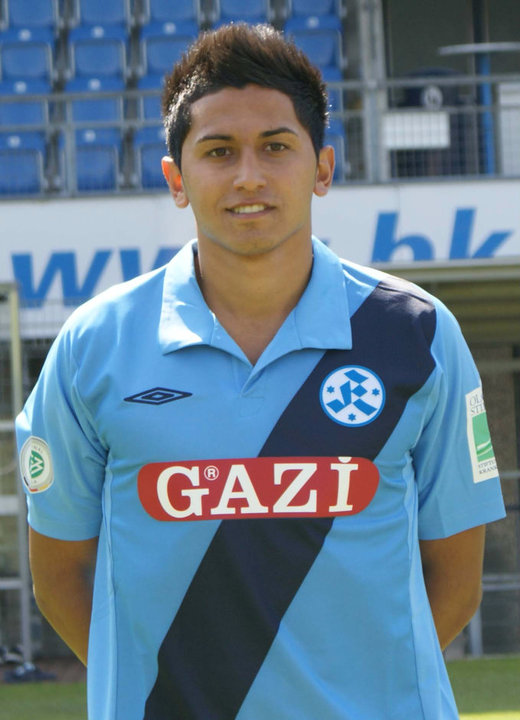

Personal information
- Full name: Hüseyin-Ali Pala
- Date of birth: 9 April 1990 (age 36)
- Place of birth: Backnang, Germany
- Height: 1.85 m (6 ft 1 in)
- Position: Striker

Team information
- Current team: Bayburt İdarespor
- Number: 68

Youth career
- –2008: Stuttgarter Kickers
- 2008–2009: VfB Stuttgart

Senior career*
Years	Team	Apps	(Gls)
2009–2010	VfB Stuttgart II	9	(1)
2010–2012	Stuttgarter Kickers	33	(12)
2013–2014	SGS Großaspach	3	(0)
2014–2015	Turgutluspor	33	(5)
2015–2017	Gümüşhanespor	38	(8)
2017	→ İnegölspor (loan)	10	(1)
2017–	Bayburt İdarespor	10	(2)
- * Club domestic league appearances and goals as of 14 January 2018

Hüseyin-Ali Pala (born 9 April 1990) is a Turkish-German footballer who plays for Bayburt İdarespor.
