= Tobias Rühle =

German footballer

Personal information
- Date of birth: 7 February 1991 (age 35)
- Place of birth: Heidenheim an der Brenz, Germany
- Height: 1.75 m (5 ft 9 in)
- Position: Forward

Youth career
- 1996–2004: TSV Herbrechtingen
- 2004–2006: SSV Ulm 1846
- 2006–2009: VfB Stuttgart

Senior career*
Years	Team	Apps	(Gls)
2009–2011	VfB Stuttgart II	40	(2)
2011–2012	1. FC Heidenheim	19	(2)
2012–2013	Stuttgarter Kickers	26	(1)
2013–2016	Sonnenhof Großaspach	101	(24)
2016–2019	Preußen Münster	102	(4)
2019–2020	KFC Uerdingen 05	7	(0)
2020–2024	SSV Ulm 1846	92	(24)
2024–2026	FV Illertissen	69	(17)

International career
2008–2009	Germany U18	3	(0)
2009–2010	Germany U19	4	(0)
- * Club domestic league appearances and goals as of 1 July 2026

Tobias Rühle (born 7 February 1991) is a German footballer.

== Career ==
After his contract with Sonnenhof Großaspach had expired at the end of the 2015-16 season, he joined Preußen Münster on a two-year contract starting 1 July 2016.

On 25 March 2019 KFC Uerdingen 05 confirmed, that they had signed Rühle for the upcoming 2019–20 season. On 31 January 2020, he joined SSV Ulm 1846 on a contract until the summer 2022.
