= Fabian Eisele =

German footballer

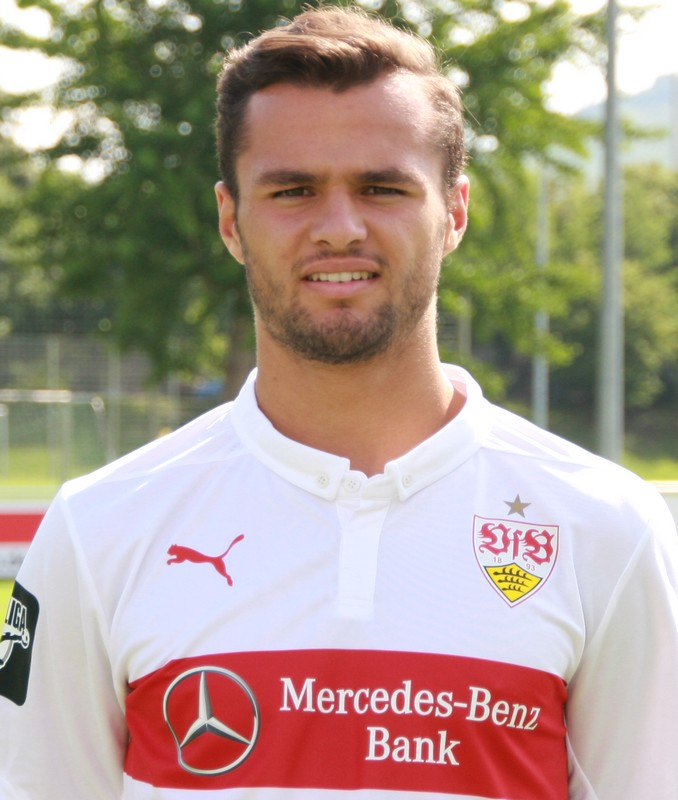
- Eisele in 2014

Personal information
- Date of birth: 10 March 1995 (age 31)
- Place of birth: Stuttgart, Germany
- Height: 1.83 m (6 ft 0 in)
- Position: Forward

Team information
- Current team: SG Sonnenhof Großaspach
- Number: 23

Youth career
- TSV Münchingen
- –2010: Stuttgarter Kickers
- 2010–2014: VfB Stuttgart

Senior career*
| Years | Team | Apps | (Gls) |
| 2014–2015 | VfB Stuttgart II | 18 | (2) |
| 2015–2017 | Hertha BSC II | 61 | (22) |
| 2017–2018 | FSV Zwickau | 27 | (6) |
| 2018–2020 | 1. FC Saarbrücken | 40 | (14) |
| 2020 | TSV Steinbach Haiger | 3 | (1) |
| 2020–2022 | Carl Zeiss Jena | 41 | (23) |
| 2022–2024 | FC Homburg | 61 | (18) |
| 2024– | SG Sonnenhof Großaspach | 67 | (58) |
- * Club domestic league appearances and goals as of 26 June 2026

Fabian Eisele (born 10 March 1995) is a German footballer who plays as a forward for SG Sonnenhof Großaspach.

== Club career ==
Eisele made on 26 July 2014 his debut for VfB Stuttgart II in the 3. Liga against Dynamo Dresden in a 2–1 away defeat. He replaced Marco Grüttner after 67 minutes.

For the 2015–16 season he moved to Hertha BSC II.

== Honours ==
Sonnenhof Großaspach

- Regionalliga Südwest: 2025–26
- Oberliga Baden-Württemberg: 2024–25
