= Marko Kovač =

Marko Kovač may refer to:

- Marko Kovač (bishop) (born 1981), Croatian Roman Catholic prelate
- Marko Kovač (director) (born 1981), Serbian architect and film director
- Marko Kovač (footballer) (born 1987), Croatian footballer
