= Denis Berger =

Austrian footballer (born 1983)

Personal information
- Full name: Denis Berger
- Date of birth: 14 April 1983 (age 43)
- Place of birth: Vienna, Austria
- Height: 1.81 m (5 ft 11 1/2 in)
- Position: Left midfielder

Team information
- Current team: Türkspor Stuttgart
- Number: 22

Youth career
- 1986–1988: Prater SV
- 1988–1997: Austria Vienna
- 1997–2002: VfB Stuttgart

Senior career*
Years	Team	Apps	(Gls)
2002–2006	VfB Stuttgart II	116	(20)
2006–2007	Sportfreunde Siegen	10	(1)
2007–2008	Hessen Kassel	40	(4)
2008–2009	SV Ried	20	(0)
2009–2010	Jahn Regensburg	35	(3)
2010–2011	Kickers Offenbach	22	(2)
2011–2012	VfL Bochum	16	(0)
2012–2013	Hansa Rostock	14	(1)
2013–2015	SG Sonnenhof Großaspach	42	(2)
2015–2016	Leinfelden-Echterdingen	25	(4)
2016–2018	NAFI Stuttgart	25	(13)
2018–2020	ASV Botnang	13	(4)
2020–	Türkspor Stuttgart	4	(0)

International career^{‡}
2003–2004	Austria U-21	20	(0)
- * Club domestic league appearances and goals as of 8 February 2021 ‡ National team caps and goals as of 5 January 2012

Denis Berger (born 14 April 1983) is an Austrian footballer who plays for Türkspor Stuttgart.

== Statistics ==
As of 16 August 2013

Club performance			League		Cup		Total	
Season	Club	League	Apps	Goals	Apps	Goals	Apps	Goals
Germany			League		DFB-Pokal		Total	
2001–02	VfB Stuttgart II	Regionalliga Süd	2	0	0	0	2	0
2002–03	VfB Stuttgart II	Oberliga Baden-Württemberg	30	9	—		30	9
2003–04	VfB Stuttgart II	Regionalliga Süd	29	3	—		29	3
2004–05	VfB Stuttgart II	Regionalliga Süd	29	4	—		29	4
2005–06	VfB Stuttgart II	Regionalliga Süd	26	4	—		26	4
2006–07	Sportfreunde Siegen	Regionalliga Süd	10	1	1	0	11	1
2006–07	Hessen Kassel	Regionalliga Süd	13	2	—		13	2
2007–08	Hessen Kassel	Regionalliga Süd	27	2	—		27	2
Austria			League		Austrian Cup		Total	
2008–09	SV Ried	Bundesliga	20	0	4	1	24	1
Germany			League		DFB-Pokal		Total	
2009–10	Jahn Regensburg	3. Liga	35	3	—		35	3
2010–11	Kickers Offenbach	3. Liga	22	3	2	1	24	4
2011–12	VfL Bochum	2. Bundesliga	16	0	2	1	18	1
2012–13	F.C. Hansa Rostock	3. Liga	14	1	1	0	15	1
2013–14	SG Sonnenhof Großaspach	Regionalliga Südwest	2	0	0	0	2	0
Total	Germany		255	32	6	2	261	34
Total	Austria		20	0	4	1	24	1
Career total			275	32	10	3	285	35
