= Scheffel =

The Scheffel was the German bushel.

Scheffel is also used as a German surname. Notable people include:

- David Scheffel, Canadian anthropologist
- Johan Henrik Scheffel (1690-1781), Swedish artist
- Joseph Viktor von Scheffel (1826–1886), German poet and novelist
- Mark Scheffel (born 1959), American politician
- Michael Scheffel (born 1958), professor for the history of modern German literature
- Rudolf Scheffel (1915–1983), German Luftwaffe ace
- Tom Scheffel (born 1994), German footballer

== See also ==
- Scheffel Hall, Manhattan, New York City
- Scheffler
