= Shqiprim =

- Gender: Male

Origin
- Region of origin: Albania

Shqiprim is a predominantly Albanian language masculine given name. Notable people bearing the name Shqiprim include:

- Shqiprim Arifi (born 1976), Albanian-Serbian politician and businessman
- Shqiprim Binakaj (born 1989), Kosovan footballer
- Shqiprim Taipi (born 1997), Albanian footballer
