= Nicolas Jüllich =

German footballer

Personal information
- Date of birth: 27 March 1990 (age 36)
- Place of birth: Heidelberg, West Germany
- Height: 1.82 m (6 ft 0 in)
- Position: Central midfielder

Team information
- Current team: Fortuna Heddesheim
- Number: 8

Youth career
- FC Dossenheim
- –2006: TSG Weinheim
- 2006–2008: Waldhof Mannheim

Senior career*
Years	Team	Apps	(Gls)
2008–2010	Waldhof Mannheim	53	(3)
2010–2012	Bayern Munich II	44	(4)
2010–2011	→ Bayern Munich	0	(0)
2012–2013	1. FC Saarbrücken	24	(1)
2013–2017	Sonnenhof Großaspach	68	(6)
2017–2018	FC Vaduz	12	(3)
2018–2022	Sonnenhof Großaspach	86	(6)
2022–2024	VfR Mannheim	21	(1)
2024–	Fortuna Heddesheim	0	(0)
- * Club domestic league appearances and goals as of 05:53, 4 July 2024 (UTC)

Nicolas Jüllich (born 27 March 1990) is a German footballer who plays as a central midfielder for Fortuna Heddesheim.

== Career ==
Jüllich began his career with Waldhof Mannheim, where he played for two seasons in the Regionalliga before joining Bayern in July 2010. He made his 3. Liga debut in the opening match of the 2010–11 season, a 1–0 defeat against SV Babelsberg. He has played for Bayern's first-team in pre-season friendlies in 2010, most notably the Franz Beckenbauer farewell match against Real Madrid, where he played as a stand-in for Philipp Lahm at right back, and earned praise for his performance up against Cristiano Ronaldo. He was named in Bayern's squad for the 2010–11 UEFA Champions League, where he was given the number 34, and was named on the substitutes' bench for a Bundesliga match against Hannover 96 in October 2010. After two years with Bayern's reserves, he joined 1. FC Saarbrücken in summer 2012, where he spent a season before being released in 2013. He signed for SG Sonnenhof Großaspach four months later.
