= Matthias Morys =

Polish-German football forward

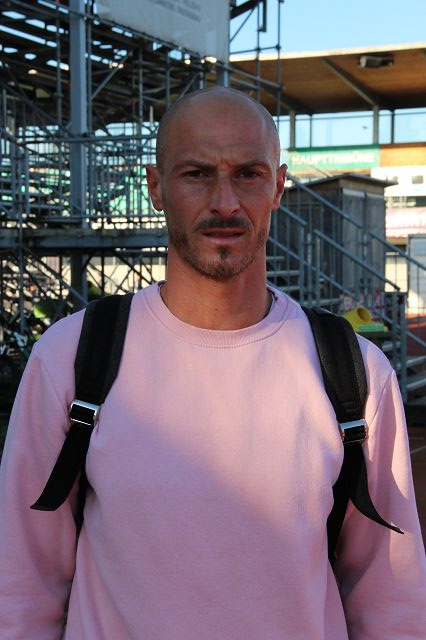
- Morys with Austria Lustenau in September 2019

Personal information
- Full name: Matthias Josef Morys
- Date of birth: 19 March 1987 (age 39)
- Place of birth: Gliwice, Poland
- Height: 1.85 m (6 ft 1 in)
- Position: Forward

Youth career
- SpVgg Rommelshausen
- TSG Backnang

Senior career*
Years	Team	Apps	(Gls)
2005–2006	1. FC Normannia Gmünd	30	(4)
2006–2008	VfB Stuttgart II	56	(7)
2008–2009	Kickers Offenbach	29	(4)
2009–2010	Chernomorets Burgas	28	(3)
2011	VfR Aalen	9	(1)
2011–2012	Sonnenhof Großaspach	41	(27)
2013–2015	RB Leipzig	47	(5)
2015	→ Sonnenhof Großaspach (loan)	14	(1)
2015–2019	VfR Aalen	131	(41)
2019–2020	Austria Lustenau	12	(4)
2020	Sonnenhof Großaspach	10	(1)
- * Club domestic league appearances and goals

Matthias Josef Morys (born 19 March 1987) is a Polish-German former professional football forward.

== Career ==
Born in Gliwice, Silesia, Poland, Morys started his senior career playing for 1. FC Normannia Gmünd in 2005. In 2006, he moved to VfB Stuttgart II, where he played to 2008 scoring 7 goals in 56 matches. It was difficult for Morys to find a regular place in the first team so he moved in Kickers Offenbach. After a season he signed a contract with Bulgarian side Chernomorets Burgas. In December 2010 he was released.

After two years with RB Leipzig, he returned to SG Sonnenhof Großaspach on loan in January 2015.
