= Ralph Bergmann =

German volleyball player (born 1970)

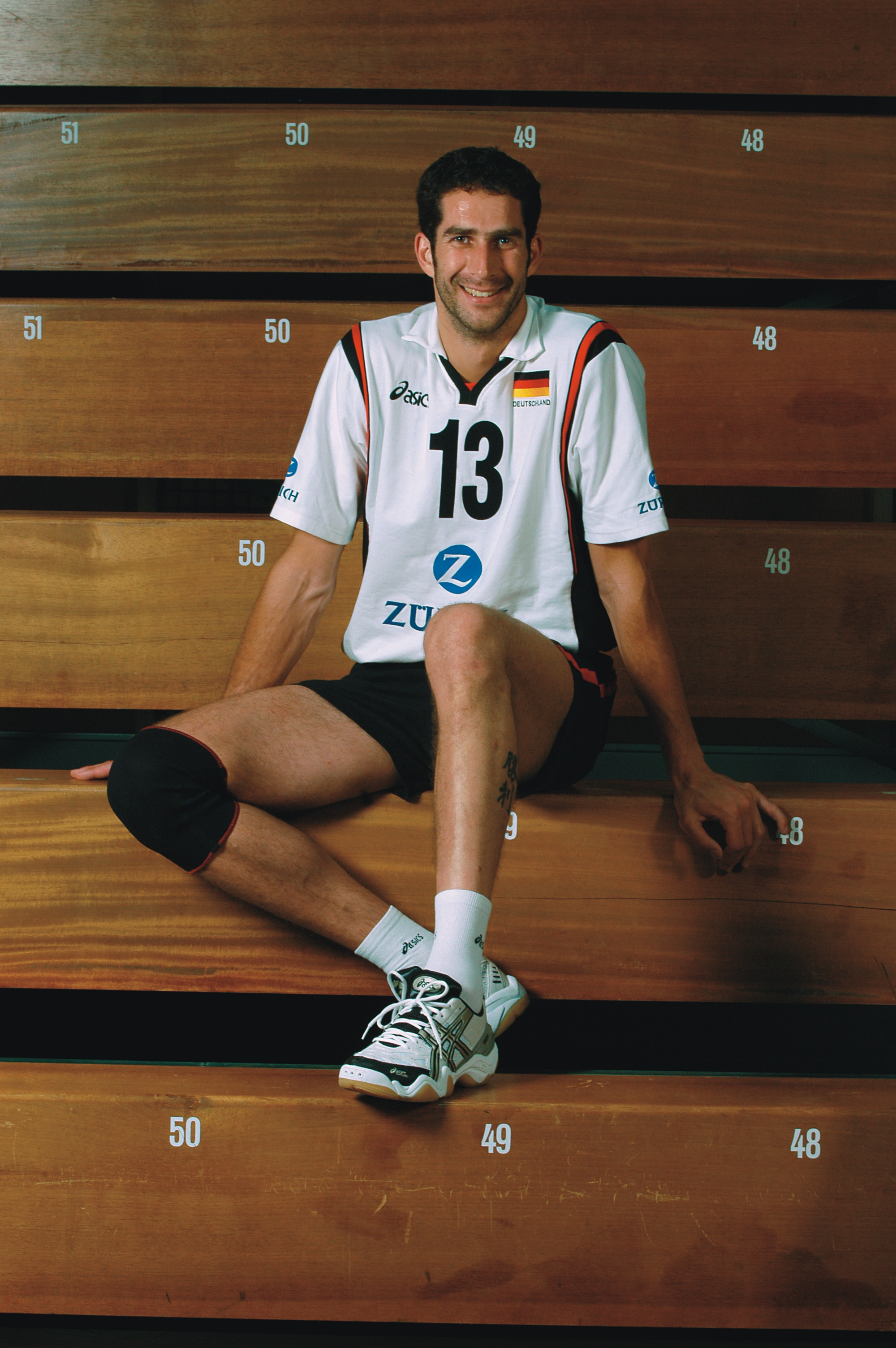
- Ralph Bergmann

Personal information
- Full name: Ralph Bergmann
- Nationality: German
- Born: May 26, 1970 (age 56); Ruit auf den Fildern, Baden-Württemberg, West Germany

Ralph Bergmann (born May 26, 1970 in Ruit auf den Fildern, Baden-Württemberg) is a volleyball player from Germany, who played for the National Team in the 2000s. He played as a middle-blocker.

== Honours ==
- 2001 FIVB World League — 13th place
- 2001 European Championship — 9th place
- 2002 FIVB World League — 9th place
- 2003 FIVB World League — 10th place
- 2006 FIVB World Championship — 9th place
- 2007 European Championship — 5th place
