= Ostfildern =

- Town
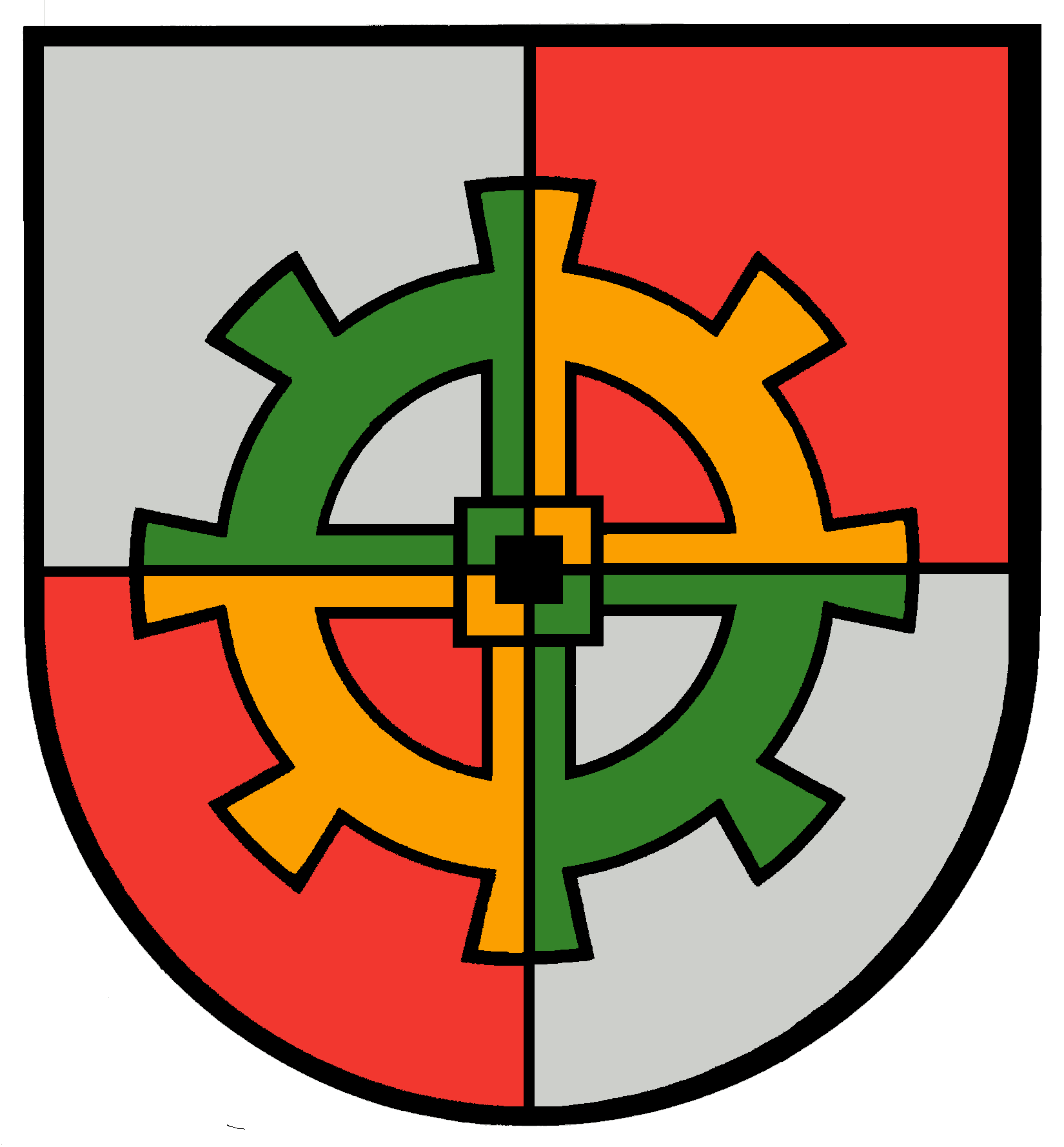
- Coat of arms

- Location of Ostfildern within Esslingen district
- Interactive map of Ostfildern
- Location within Germany Location within Baden-Württemberg
- Coordinates: 48°44′N 9°15′E
- Country: Germany
- State: Baden-Württemberg
- Admin. region: Stuttgart
- District: Esslingen
- Subdivisions: 6

Government
  - Mayor (2021–29): Christof Bolay (SPD)

Area
  - Total: 22.81 km^{2} (8.81 sq mi)
- Elevation: 348 m (1,142 ft)

Population (2025-12-31)
  - Total: 39,794
  - Density: 1,745/km^{2} (4,518/sq mi)
- Time zone: UTC+01:00 (CET)
  - Summer (DST): UTC+02:00 (CEST)
- Postal codes: 73744–73760
- Dialling codes: 0711, 07158
- Vehicle registration: ES
- Website: www.ostfildern.de

Ostfildern (German pronunciation: [ˈɔstˌfɪldɐn]; Swabian: Oschtfilder) is a town in the district of Esslingen in Baden-Württemberg in southern Germany. It is located approximately 8 km southeast of Stuttgart. It was formed in 1975 out of a fusion of the previously separate boroughs of Nellingen (including Parksiedlung), Ruit, Kemnat and Scharnhausen and currently has approximately 37,000 inhabitants.

== Geography ==
Ostfildern is situated in the east of the Filder area, a fertile plateau south of Stuttgart. It is bordered to the south by the Körsch river, which flows into the Neckar.

== History ==
The town of Ostfildern was formed on 1 January 1975 from the fusion of the formerly independent boroughs of Nellingen, Ruit, Kemnat and Scharnhausen.

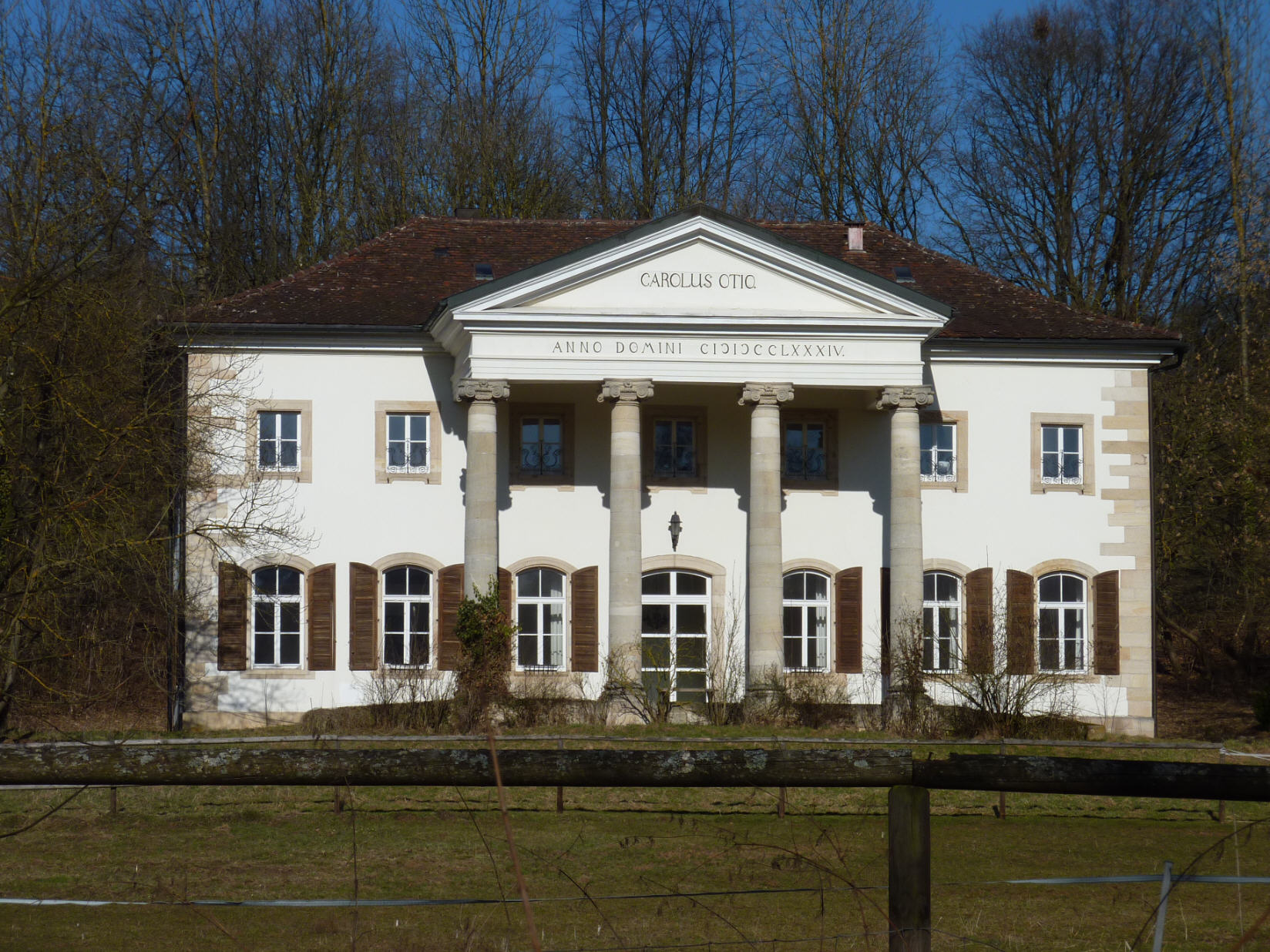
Scharnhausen castle

From 1945 to 1992 the U.S. Army operated Nellingen Kaserne as a barracks and airfield. The site has since been redeveloped as Scharnhauser Park.

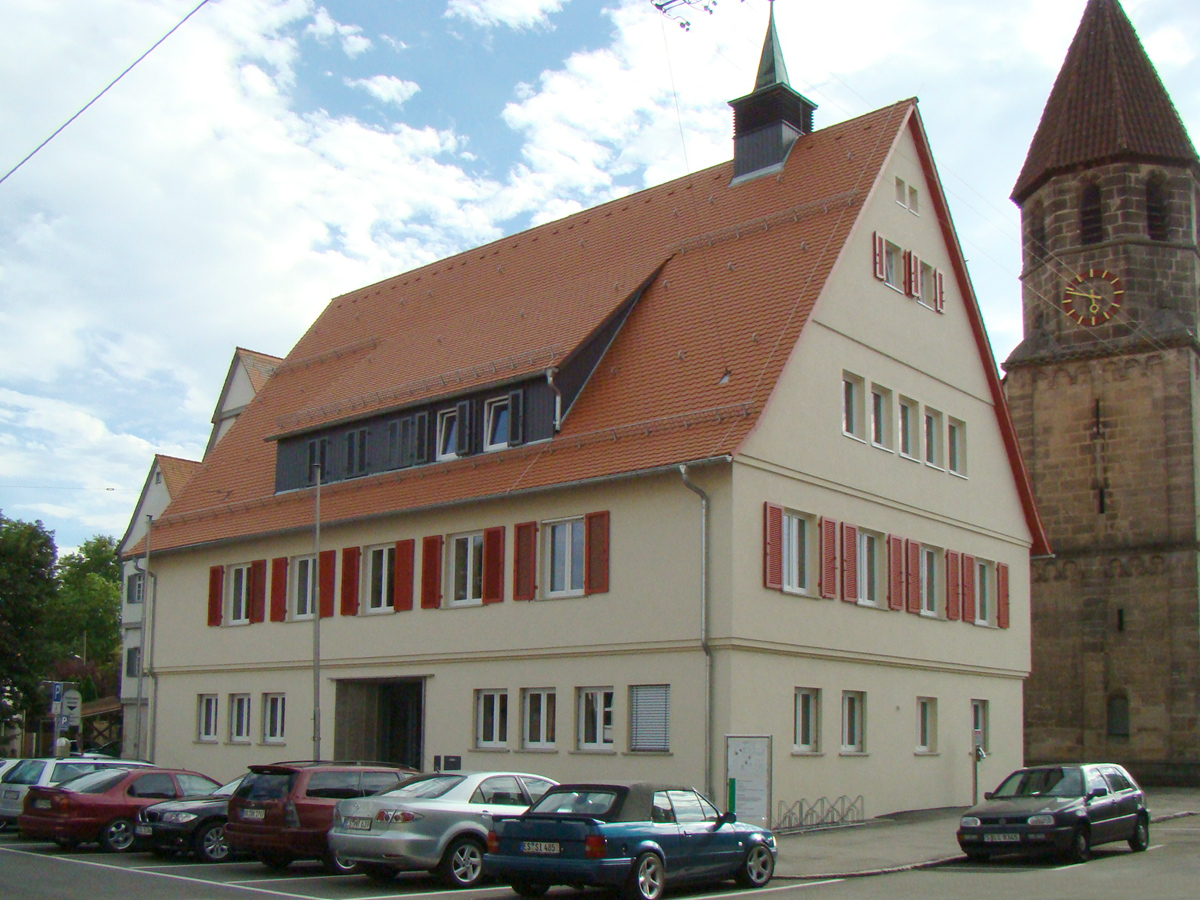
Nellingen-Town hall

A well-known inhabitant of Ostfildern is Abdul Ahad Momand, who was the first Afghan in space and who got asylum in Germany following the withdrawal of Soviet forces from Afghanistan.

=== Population Development ===
Historical population

Year	Pop.	±%
1975	27,995	—
1980	28,748	+2.7%
1985	28,094	−2.3%
1987	27,888	−0.7%
1990	28,678	+2.8%

Year	Pop.	±%
1995	30,102	+5.0%
2000	30,858	+2.5%
2005	34,122	+10.6%
2010	36,163	+6.0%
2014	37,785	+4.5%

- All results as of the last day of the year (December 31) unless noted otherwise.
- Census result for May 27, 1987

== Mayors since 1975 ==
- 1975: Richard Schall,
- 1975–1997: Gerhard Koch, (1945-1999), Mayor, since 1. July 1976 Lord Mayor
- 1997–2005: Herbert Rösch, (born 1943), Lord Mayer
- since 2005: Christof Bolay, (born 1968), Lord Mayor (SPD)

== Culture ==
Ostfildern has a vibrant cultural life in music and theater area. The most famous theater group of the city are the sliding block. For events, the center of the hall in Nellingen has two concert halls and theaters, which were built in 1989 on the site of the old tram depot.

== Buildings ==
Ostfildern has only a few historical buildings. In Nellingen district are still some buildings of the monastery square obtained, namely the provost, the old rectory of 1565 or the fruit box with gables. The since the 1990s rising Scharnhauser Park often received awards for design and architecture. Award winners are the brick school by Arno Lederer, the children's house of Janson and Wolfrum and the point blocks of Kohlhoff and Kohlhoff. For the overall concept of the new district, Ostfildern won the Deutscher Städtebaupreis in 2006. Also the Körsch Viaduct, inaugurated in 1995, is worth noting.

== Established businesses ==
Economic importance has Ostfildern mainly as a printing and publishing city. Since the 1960s, the business location Ostfildern has become a focus of the printing and publishing industry in the region. Well-known companies are Jan Thorbecke Verlag, MairDumont, Schwabenverlag, J.Fink Mediengruppe. With the software manufacturer agorum Software, an IT company is based in Ostfildern. The company develops and distributes the open source document management system "Agorum core". In addition, the machine industry is also present, like in the whole region. Since 2003, the German Automobil Treuhand (DAT) residents in Scharnhauser Park. Festo built in 2014 in the district Scharnhausen for 70 million euros a production facility with learning factory.

== Twin towns and sister cities ==
Ostfildern is twinned with:

- Bierawa, Poland
- Hohenems, Austria
- Mirandola, Italy
- Montluel, France
- Poltava, Ukraine
- Reinach, Switzerland

== Notable people ==
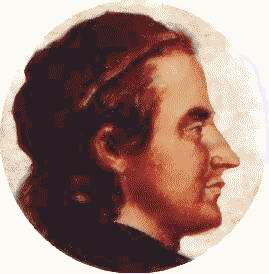
Philipp Matthäus Hahn on a medal

- Philipp Matthäus Hahn (1739–1790), pastor, astronomer and inventor
- Reinhold Fritz (1884–1950), operatic bass-baritone
- Cassandra Steen (born 1980), soul singer, lead singer of the pop/soul trio Glashaus.

=== Sport ===
- Ralph Bergmann (born 1970), national volleyball team
- Stefan Schumacher (born 1981), cyclist
- Martin Cimander (born 1981), former footballer who played 349 games
- Tobias Rathgeb (born 1982), retired football midfielder who played 379 games
- Manuel Späth (born 1985), handball player
- Erich Berko (born 1994), footballer who has played over 270 games
