= Sebastian Schiek =

German footballer

Personal information
- Date of birth: 20 March 1990 (age 36)
- Place of birth: Bruchsal, Germany
- Height: 1.83 m (6 ft 0 in)
- Position: Right-back

Team information
- Current team: FSV Hollenbach
- Number: 17

Youth career
- FC Germania Karlsdorf
- –2003: Waldhof Mannheim
- 2003–2009: Karlsruher SC

Senior career*
Years	Team	Apps	(Gls)
2009–2012	Karlsruher SC II	56	(7)
2011–2014	Karlsruher SC	28	(0)
2014–2018	Sonnenhof Großaspach	73	(5)
2018–2019	Fortuna Köln	31	(2)
2020	VfR Aalen	3	(0)
2020–2022	Sonnenhof Großaspach	56	(6)
2023–	FSV Hollenbach	45	(7)
- * Club domestic league appearances and goals as of 1 June 2024

Sebastian Schiek (born 20 March 1990) is a German professional footballer who plays as a right-back for FSV Hollenbach.

== Career ==
He made his debut for Karlsruher SC in August 2011, as a substitute for Dennis Kempe in a 2–0 defeat to Energie Cottbus in the 2. Bundesliga.

He signed for Fortuna Köln in summer 2018 after his contract expired at his previous club.

Having been without a contract since leaving Fortuna Köln in the summer of 2019, he signed for VfR Aalen on a contract until summer 2020 in January 2020.

He returned to Sonnenhof Großaspach in August 2020.
