= Fabian Aupperle =

German footballer

Personal information
- Date of birth: 16 February 1986 (age 40)
- Place of birth: Backnang, West Germany
- Height: 1.93 m (6 ft 4 in)
- Position: Defender

Team information
- Current team: FC Erding

Youth career
- SV Unterweissach
- Viktoria Backnang
- TSG Backnang
- –2004: VfB Stuttgart

Senior career*
Years	Team	Apps	(Gls)
2004–2005	VfB Stuttgart II	1	(0)
2005–2010	Sonnenhof Großaspach	106	(9)
2010–2011	1. FC Heidenheim	32	(2)
2011–2013	Wacker Burghausen	22	(1)
2013–2015	1899 Hoffenheim II	26	(3)
2015	Sonnenhof Großaspach	11	(1)
2015–	FC Erding	63	(9)

Managerial career
- 2016–: FC Erding
- * Club domestic league appearances and goals as of 12 February 2021

Fabian Aupperle (born 16 February 1986) is a German footballer who plays for German lower league side FC Erding.
