= Martin Cimander =

German footballer

Personal information
- Full name: Martin Cimander
- Date of birth: 3 October 1981 (age 45)
- Place of birth: Ostfildern, West Germany
- Height: 1.82 m (6 ft 0 in)
- Position: Centre-back

Team information
- Current team: TSV Nellmersbach

Youth career
- Stuttgarter Kickers
- VfR Heilbronn
- –2000: Sonnenhof Großaspach

Senior career*
Years	Team	Apps	(Gls)
2000–2017	Sonnenhof Großaspach	330	(12)
2014–2015	Sonnenhof Großaspach II	4	(0)
2018–	TSV Nellmersbach	15	

International career
2014–2018	Sonnenhof Großaspach (assistant)		
- * Club domestic league appearances and goals as of 05:57, 3 December 2018 (UTC)

Martin Cimander (born 3 October, 1981) is a German footballer who plays as a centre-back for TSV Nellmersbach.

== Career ==
Cimander made his professional debut in the 3. Liga for Sonnenhof Großaspach on 23 May 2015, coming on as a substitute in the 83rd minute for Simon Skarlatidis in the 0–1 home loss against Arminia Bielefeld.
