= Walter Thomae =

German football coach (born 1966)

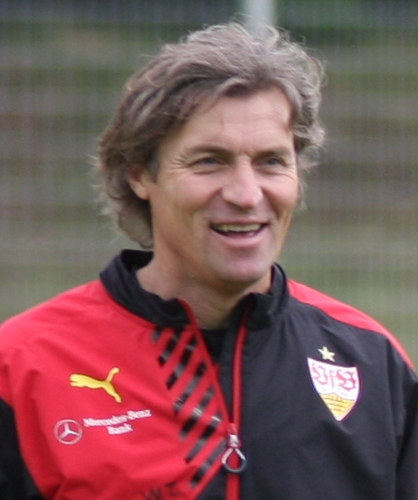

Personal information
- Date of birth: 4 November 1966 (age 59)
- Place of birth: Dumitra, Romania

Managerial career
- Years: Team
- FV Löchgau
- 2006–2015: VfB Stuttgart II (assistant)
- 2015–2016: VfB Stuttgart II
- 2021: Sonnenhof Großaspach

Walter Thomae (born 4 November 1966) is a German football coach.

In November 2015 Thomae became head coach of VfB Stuttgart II. He left the club in the summer 2016.
