= Daniel Hägele =

German footballer (born 1989)

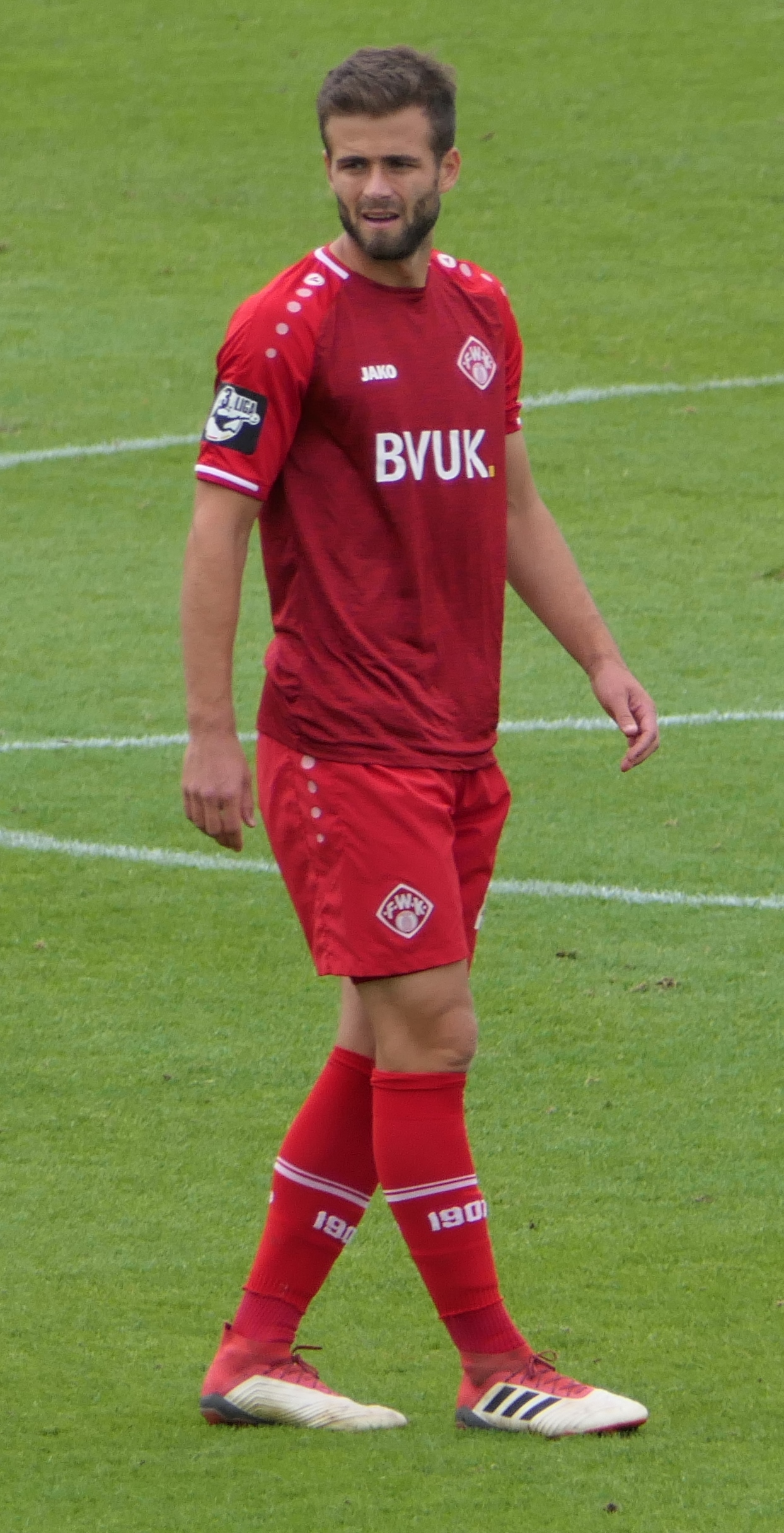
- Hägele with Würzburger Kickers in 2018

Personal information
- Date of birth: 23 February 1989 (age 37)
- Place of birth: Schwäbisch Gmünd, West Germany
- Height: 1.86 m (6 ft 1 in)
- Positions: Centre-back; midfielder

Team information
- Current team: Würzburger Kickers
- Number: 22

Youth career
- 1. FC Normannia Gmünd
- TV Heuchlingen
- –2007: SSV Ulm

Senior career*
Years	Team	Apps	(Gls)
2007–2010	VfR Aalen	6	(0)
2010–2011	SSV Ulm	15	(0)
2011–2018	Sonnenhof Großaspach	209	(11)
2018–	Würzburger Kickers	224	(9)
- * Club domestic league appearances and goals as of 28 June 2026

Daniel Hägele (born 23 February 1989) is a German professional footballer who plays as a midfielder for Würzburger Kickers.

== Career ==
In 2007, Hägele moved from the under-19 team of SSV Ulm 1846 to VfR Aalen. There, he mainly appeared for the second team. In the 2008–09 season, however, he also played for the first team in the 3. Liga. In the summer of 2010 he returned to Ulm. After six months, he moved to SG Sonnenhof Großaspach. In the summer of 2013, Hägele was also appointed team captain of the Aspach-based team. With the club, he celebrated promotion to the 3. Liga in 2014 as champion of the Regionalliga Südwest. Hägele made a total of 220 competitive appearances in which he scored 11 goals for the club, during his seven-year stint there.

For the 2018–19 season, Hägele moved to the Würzburger Kickers and signed a contract valid until June 2020. He soon established himself as a starter and played a significant role in the team's stout defense. After the retirement of Sebastian Schuppan, Hägele was appointed team captain after the club had managed promotion to the 2. Bundesliga in 2020.

== Honours ==
SG Sonnenhof Großaspach

- Regionalliga Südwest: 2013–14

Würzburger Kickers

- 3. Liga runners-up: 2019–20
- Bavarian Cup: 2018–19
