= Brooklyn Schwarz =

German footballer (born 2005)

Personal information
- Date of birth: 13 June 2005 (age 21)
- Place of birth: Stuttgart, Germany
- Height: 1.90 m (6 ft 3 in)
- Position: Centre-back

Team information
- Current team: Sonnenhof Großaspach
- Number: 29

Youth career
- 2016-2018: VfB Stuttgart
- 2018–2019: Stuttgarter Kickers
- 2019–2022: Sonnenhof Großaspach
- 2022–2023: Karlsruher SC
- 2023–2024: Sonnenhof Großaspach

Senior career*
Years	Team	Apps	(Gls)
2024–	Sonnenhof Großaspach	15	(1)
2025	→ New York Red Bulls II (loan)	14	(0)
- * Club domestic league appearances and goals as of 9 May 2026

Brooklyn Schwarz (born 13 June 2005) is a German-American footballer who plays as a defender for 3. Liga club Sonnenhof Großaspach.

== Career ==
=== Early career ===
Born in Stuttgart, Schwarz made his first footballing steps with hometown clubs Stuttgarter Kickers and VfB Stuttgart before moving to Sonnenhof Großaspach. In 2022, he transferred to the youth team of Karlsruher SC, featuring for the U-17 and U-19 teams.

=== Sonnenhof Großaspach ===
For the 2023–24 season, Schwarz returned to SG Sonnenhof Großaspach. After impressing with the U-19 side, Schwarz was moved to the first team for the 2024-25 season. Schwarz made his debut with the first team against Schwabisch Hall in a 2–0 Württemberg Cup first round win on 20 July 2024. He scored his first career goal in a 3–2 win over 1. CfR Pforzheim on 12 October 2024.

==== Loan to New York Red Bulls II ====
On 13 March 2025, New York Red Bulls II acquired Schwarz on a one-year loan from SG Sonnenhof Großaspach for the 2025 season with an option to extend the loan or execute the purchase. On 30 March 2025 Schwarz made his debut for New York, appearing as a starter in a 3–2 victory over local rival New York City FC II.

== Honours ==
Sonnenhof Großaspach

- Oberliga Baden-Württemberg: 2024–25
