= Hans-Jürgen Boysen =

German footballer and manager

Personal information
- Date of birth: 30 May 1957 (age 69)
- Place of birth: Mannheim, West Germany
- Height: 1.83 m (6 ft 0 in)
- Position: Defender

Senior career*
Years	Team	Apps	(Gls)
1980–1985	Karlsruher SC	109	(11)
1985–1986	1. FC Saarbrücken	32	(0)
Total		141	(11)

Managerial career
- 1989–1994: SV Mörlenbach
- 1994–1996: SV Sandhausen
- 1996–1997: SV Mörlenbach
- 1997–1999: Kickers Offenbach
- 2000: FC Augsburg
- 2000: Stuttgarter Kickers
- 2001–2002: SV Sandhausen
- 2002–2003: Schweinfurt 05
- 2004–2006: Kickers Offenbach
- 2007: Sonnenhof Großaspach (caretaker)
- 2008–2009: Kickers Offenbach
- 2009–2011: FSV Frankfurt
- 2012–2013: SV Sandhausen
- 2013–2014: Wormatia Worms
- 2020–2021: Sonnenhof Großaspach
- 2022: Sonnenhof Großaspach
- * Club domestic league appearances and goals

Hans-Jürgen Boysen (born 30 May 1957) is a German football manager and former player. Before, he managed SV Sandhausen and Wormatia Worms.

He has a son, Kim-Pascal Boysen, who is also a football player.
