= Dumitra =

- Commune
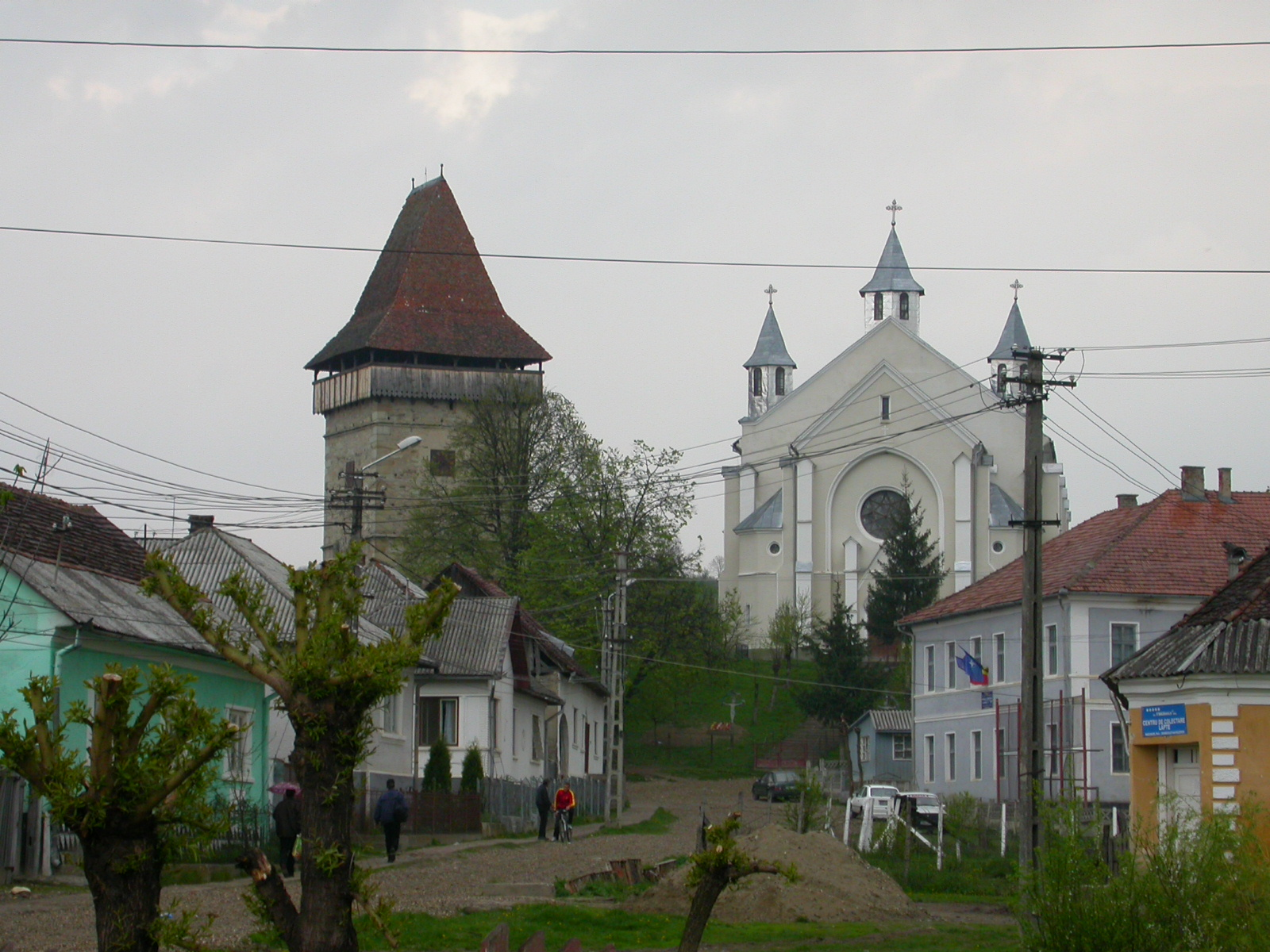
- Former Lutheran church in Dumitra

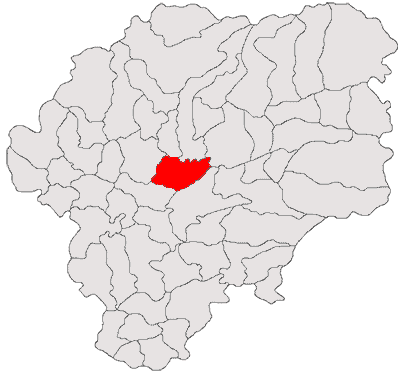
- Location in Bistrița-Năsăud County

- Location in Romania
- Coordinates: 47°13′N 24°28′E
- Country: Romania
- County: Bistrița-Năsăud

Government
  - Mayor (2020–2024): Gheorghe Balajan (PSD)
- Area: 88.99 km^{2} (34.36 sq mi)
- Elevation: 334 m (1,096 ft)
- Population (2021-12-01): 5,264
  - Density: 59.15/km^{2} (153.2/sq mi)
- Time zone: UTC+02:00 (EET)
  - Summer (DST): UTC+03:00 (EEST)
- Postal code: 427075
- Area code: +40 x59
- Vehicle reg.: BN
- Website: primariadumitra.ro

Dumitra (German: Mettersdorf; Hungarian: Nagydemeter) is a commune in Bistrița-Năsăud County, Transylvania, Romania. It is composed of three villages: Cepari (Tschippendorf; Csépán), Dumitra, and Tărpiu (Treppen; Szásztörpény).

The commune is situated on the Transylvanian Plateau, in the historic region of Nösnerland. It is located in the center of the Bistrița-Năsăud County, just 12 km (7.5 mi) north of the county seat, Bistrița.

== Natives ==
- George Ciorceri (born 1955), former footballer, currently a manager
- Gerhard Poschner (born 1969), German footballer
- Walter Thomae (born 1966), German football coach
