= Kai Gehring (footballer) =

German footballer

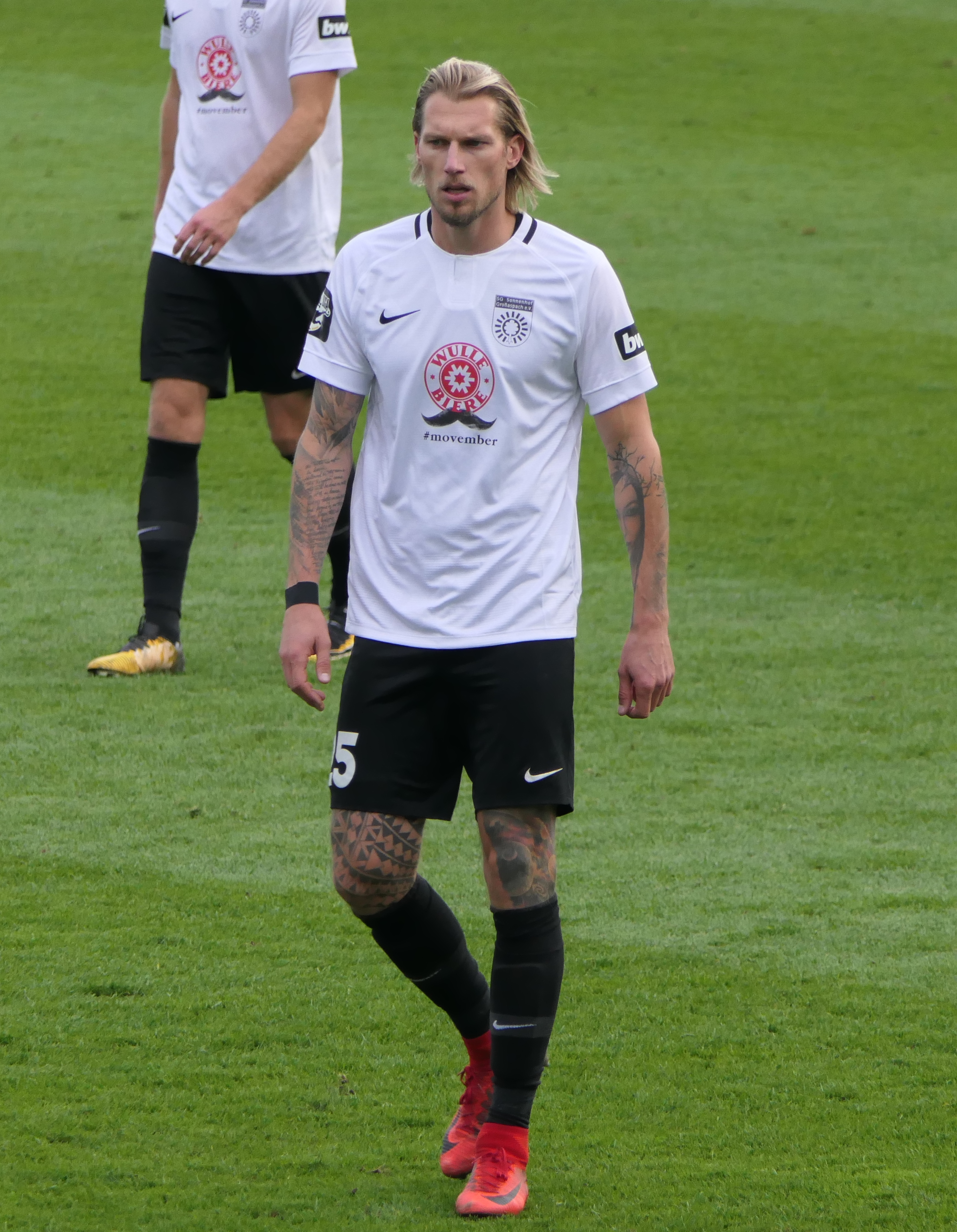

Personal information
- Date of birth: 12 February 1988 (age 38)
- Place of birth: Göppingen, West Germany
- Height: 1.93 m (6 ft 4 in)
- Position: Central defender

Team information
- Current team: TSG Salach

Youth career
- –2000: ASV Eislingen
- 2000–2002: VfB Stuttgart
- 2002–2006: SSV Ulm 1846
- 2006–2007: 1. FC Nürnberg

Senior career*
Years	Team	Apps	(Gls)
2007–2009	1. FC Nürnberg II	41	(6)
2009–2010	SV Wehen Wiesbaden	26	(1)
2009–2011	SV Wehen Wiesbaden II	16	(0)
2011–2012	1. FC Saarbrücken	33	(3)
2013–2022	Sonnenhof Großaspach	285	(15)
2022–	TSG Salach		
- * Club domestic league appearances and goals as of 14 May 2022

Kai Gehring (born 12 February 1988) is a German footballer who plays for an amateur side TSG Salach.
