= Thorsten Reiß =

German footballer

Personal information
- Date of birth: August 11, 1984 (age 42)
- Place of birth: Mannheim, West Germany
- Position: Defensive midfielder

Team information
- Current team: 1. FC Kaiserslautern II (Assistant)

Youth career
- TSV Neckerau
- TSV 1846 Mannheim

Senior career*
Years	Team	Apps	(Gls)
2003–2005	SGS Großaspach		
2005–2008	FSV Oggersheim	88	(15)
2008–2009	Stuttgarter Kickers	18	(0)
2009–2014	SV Elversberg	106	(2)
2014–2016	1. FC Kaiserslautern II	52	(1)

Managerial career
- 2016–: 1. FC Kaiserslautern II (assistant)
- * Club domestic league appearances and goals

Thorsten Reiß (born August 11, 1984) is a German former footballer, who currently is working as an assistant manager for 1. FC Kaiserslautern II.
