= Sahr Senesie =

German footballer

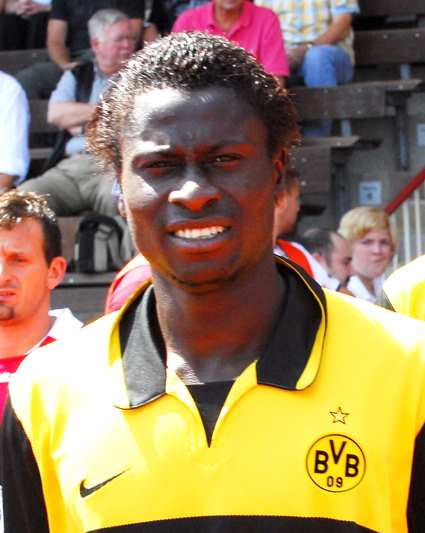
- Senesie with Borussia Dortmund

Personal information
- Date of birth: 20 June 1985 (age 41)
- Place of birth: Koidu, Sierra Leone
- Height: 1.73 m (5 ft 8 in)
- Positions: Striker; left winger

Senior career*
Years	Team	Apps	(Gls)
2002–2008	Borussia Dortmund II	81	(25)
2004–2008	Borussia Dortmund	24	(0)
2004–2005	→ Grasshoppers (loan)	6	(0)
2005–2006	→ 1899 Hoffenheim (loan)	25	(5)
2008–2010	Eintracht Trier	40	(11)
2010–2011	FC Homburg	26	(5)
2011–2013	Wacker Burghausen	54	(10)
2013–2015	SG Sonnenhof Großaspach	48	(13)
Total		304	(69)

International career
2003–2005	Germany U-20	9	(2)
2004–2005	Germany U-21	4	(1)
- * Club domestic league appearances and goals

Sahr Senesie (German pronunciation: [ˈzaːɐ̯ zeˈnɛzi]; born 20 June 1985) is a German former professional footballer who played as a forward.

== Biography ==
Born in Koidu, Sierra Leone, Senesie moved to Germany in 1997. He is the half-brother of football defender Antonio Rüdiger.

== Club career ==
In Germany, Senesie was scouted by Borussia Dortmund youth coach while playing street football. The coach brought him to the Borussia Dortmund youth team. During his first season with the youth team, Senesie was the team leading scorer. He joined the Borussia Dortmund under-19 youth and lead the teams to two junior Bundesliga titles. After several successful seasons with the youth team, Senesie moved to the senior Bourussia Dortmund team in 2005. After 24 appearances for the senior team, he had loan spells with Grasshopper Club Zürich and TSG 1899 Hoffenheim. He returned to Dortmund but was released in 2008.

In 2008, he had a trial with Nottingham Forest but failed to impress manager Colin Calderwood. On 15 November he signed a contract with SV Eintracht Trier 05. Two years later he moved to FC Homburg, where he spent one season, leaving in 2011 after the club were relegated from the Regionalliga West. He then signed for SV Wacker Burghausen, where he spent two seasons before signing for SG Sonnenhof Großaspach in July 2013. On 1 June 2014, Senesie scored the only goal in the second leg of the promotion playoff away at VfL Wolfsburg II. As the first leg had ended 0–0, this was enough for Großaspach to secure promotion to the 3. Liga.

== International career ==
Senesie has represented Germany – his adopted home – at various youth levels. He was a prominent player for the German U-20 side that participated at the 2005 Under-20 World Cup.
