= WIRmachenDRUCK Arena =

Stadium in Aspach, Baden-Württemberg, Germany

Coordinates: 48.980485°N 9.393005°E

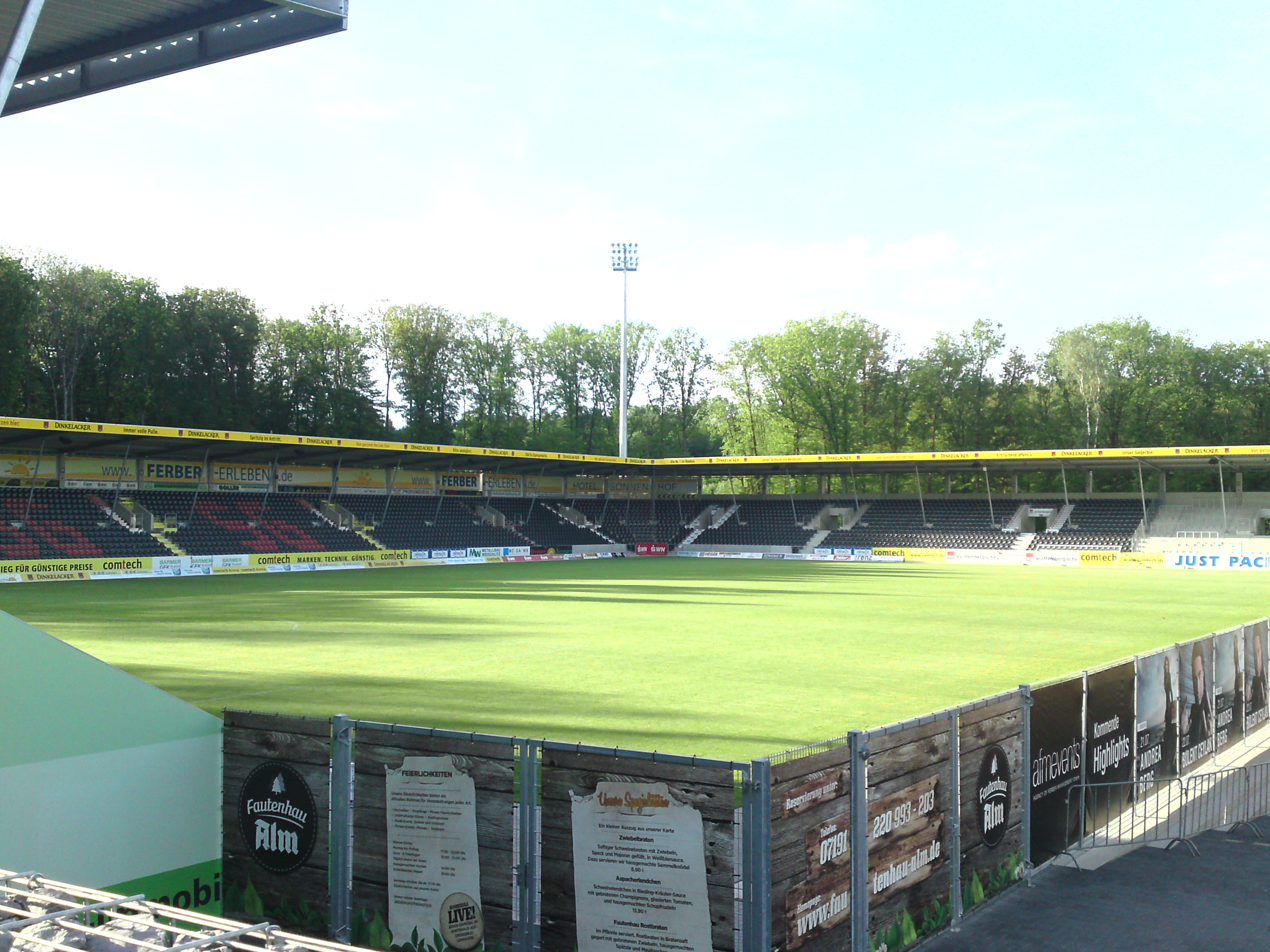
- Interactive map of WIRmachenDRUCK Arena
- Former names: Sportpark Fautenhau (until 2011) comtech Arena (2011–2014) mechatronik Arena (2014–2019)
- Location: Aspach, Germany
- Capacity: 10,001
- Surface: Grass
- Field size: 105 x 68

Construction
- Groundbreaking: 2010
- Opened: 16 August 2011
- Cost: €10,200,000

Tenants
- SG Sonnenhof Großaspach (2011–present); VfB Stuttgart II (2024–)

WIRmachenDRUCK Arena is a football stadium in Aspach, Germany. The stadium was opened in August 2011, and has a capacity of 10,001, with 6,500 seats all covered with roofs. The stadium was built using funds from twelve investors, including singer Andrea Berg.

It is the home stadium of SG Sonnenhof Großaspach. It can be used also for music concerts, able to support 15,000 capacity. The attendance record for a football match was set in a friendly match against FC Bayern Munich on 13 July 2013, when the stadium was sold out for the first time in its history. VfB Stuttgart II, the reserve team of VfB Stuttgart, will also use the stadium as their home ground after promotion to the 2024–25 3. Liga.
