= Gökhan Gümüşsu =

Turkish footballer

Personal information
- Date of birth: 17 February 1989 (age 37)
- Place of birth: Stuttgart, Germany
- Height: 1.92 m (6 ft 4 in)
- Position: Forward

Youth career
- SKG Max-Eyth-See Stuttgart
- VfB Stuttgart
- –2003: TSV Steinhaldenfeld
- 2003–2008: Stuttgarter Kickers

Senior career*
Years	Team	Apps	(Gls)
2008–2010	Stuttgarter Kickers II	31	(10)
2008–2010	Stuttgarter Kickers	21	(0)
2010–2012	1860 München II	58	(14)
2012–2013	1461 Trabzon	0	(0)
2013–2014	Altınordu	13	(1)
2014	Darıca Gençlerbirliği	14	(1)
2014–2015	1. FC Heiningen		
2015	Rot-Weiß Oberhausen II	2	(0)
2015	Rot-Weiß Oberhausen	11	(4)
2015–2018	Calcio Leinfelden-Echterdingen		
2018–2019	SSV Reutlingen	25	(4)
- * Club domestic league appearances and goals

Gökhan Gümüşsu (born 17 February 1989) is a Turkish former professional footballer who played as a forward.
