= Thomas Gentner =

German footballer

Personal information
- Date of birth: 4 October 1988 (age 38)
- Place of birth: Nürtingen, West Germany
- Height: 1.84 m (6 ft 0 in)
- Position: Midfielder

Youth career
- –2007: VfB Stuttgart

Senior career*
Years	Team	Apps	(Gls)
2007–2008	Stuttgart Kickers II	40	(3)
2008–2009	Stuttgart Kickers	18	(0)
2009–2010	Eintracht Frankfurt U23	29	(0)
2010–2015	TuS Koblenz	130	(4)
- * Club domestic league appearances and goals

Thomas Gentner (born 4 October 1988) is a retired professional footballer who played as a left-sided defender and midfielder.

== Career history ==
Thomas came through the youth system at VfB Stuttgart. In 2007, he was signed by Stuttgart Kickers. In the 2007–08 season, he played for their reserve side Stuttgart Kickers II, who play in the German Oberliga. In the 2008–09 season he was promoted to the first team, and made 18 appearances in the professional 3. Liga.

In 2009–10, he played for Eintracht Frankfurt U23 in the fourth tier Regionalliga Süd. By 2010–11 he was back in the 3. Liga with TuS Koblenz, playing 37 games and scoring twice in the league, and making a further three appearances in the DFB-Pokal cup. Both league goals came in a 3–2 victory over SV Wehen Wiesbaden. Although the team finished the season in 11th place, they were not granted a 3. Liga license for 2011–12 as a result of financial problems. Effectively relegated, they would instead compete in the fourth tier Regionalliga West. Thomas left the club in June 2011. Kickers Offenbach made an approach to sign the player in the same month, but this was withdrawn when the player took too long to demonstrate a commitment to join the 3. Liga side.

In July 2011, he joined Scottish Premier League side Aberdeen for a trial at their pre-season training programme in Netherlands and Germany. On 6 July 2011 he played for Aberdeen in a friendly match against 2. Bundesliga side VfL Bochum, crossing for Darren Mackie to score Aberdeen's only goal in a 2–1 defeat. The following day, however, manager Craig Brown confirmed that he would not be signing the player as he did not think he would significantly improve the existing squad.

Later in the same month, he joined FC Nordsjælland from the Danish Superliga for a trial. He played in a 1–0 friendly defeat to Dutch side NEC Nijmegen on 9 July 2011.

In August 2011 he signed a new contract with TuS Koblenz. His first match for the club in the 2011–12 season was a 1–0 Regionalliga West defeat to SC Verl.

== Personal life ==
Thomas is the brother of VfB Stuttgart midfielder and German international Christian Gentner. In a 2010 interview with the German Football Association, Thomas accepted that he would be unlikely to ever play at the same level as his brother. In the same article, Christian claimed that Thomas has the potential and ability to succeed at Bundesliga II level.
