= Shqiprim Binakaj =

Kosovan footballer

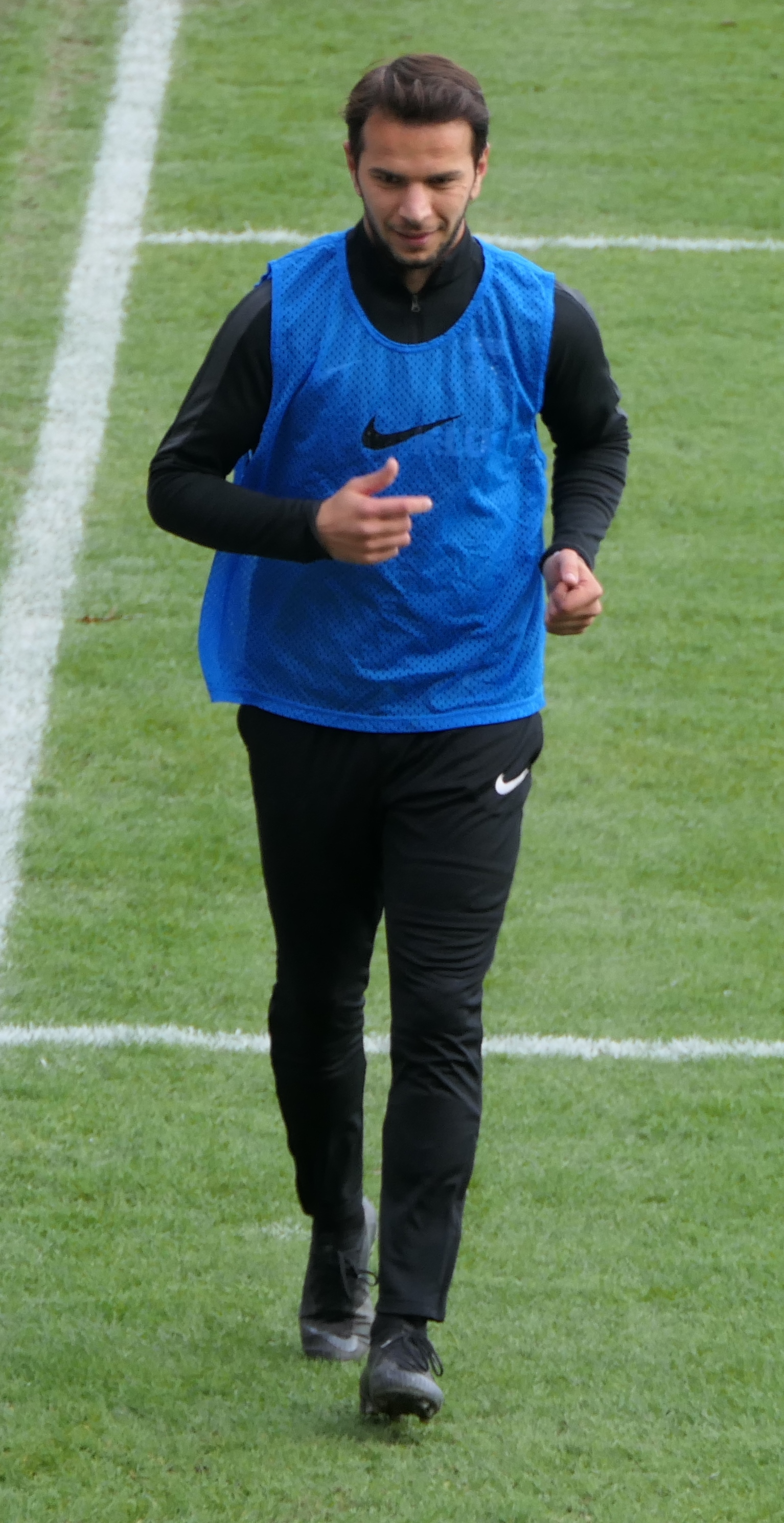
- Binakaj in 2018

Personal information
- Date of birth: 26 April 1989 (age 37)
- Place of birth: Gjakova, SFR Yugoslavia
- Height: 1.78 m (5 ft 10 in)
- Position: Left midfielder

Youth career
- SV Winnenden
- –2008: TSG Backnang

Senior career*
Years	Team	Apps	(Gls)
2007–2008	Sonnenhof Großaspach		
2008–2019	Sonnenhof Großaspach	321	(43)
2019–2022	TSG Backnang		
- * Club domestic league appearances and goals

Shqiprim Binakaj (born 26 April 1989) is a Kosovan former professional footballer who played as a midfielder for TSG Backnang and Sonnenhof Großaspach.
