= Scheffler =

Scheffler is a German surname:

- Axel Scheffler (born 1957), German book illustrator
- Christoph Thomas Scheffler (1699–1756) Painter of the rococo period, famous mostly for his frescoes
- Erna Scheffler (1893–1983), German senior judge
- Felix Scheffler (1915–1986), German World War II Wehrmacht veteran and later chief of East German People's Navy
- Herb Scheffler (1917–2001), American professional basketball player
- Israel Scheffler (1923–2014), philosopher of science and of education
- János Scheffler (1887–1952), bishop of Romania and Hungary
- Johann(es) Scheffler, also called Angelus Silesius, (1624–1677), mystic and physician
- Karl Scheffler (1869–1951), German art critic and publicist
- Scottie Scheffler (born 1996), American golfer
- Steve Scheffler (born 1967), American professional basketball player
- Ted Scheffler (1864–1949), American Major League Baseball outfielder
- Tom Scheffler (born 1954), American professional basketball player
- Tony Scheffler (born 1983), American football tight end
- Wolfgang Scheffler (historian) (1929–2008), professor of Political Science and History at the Free University of Berlin
- Wolfgang Scheffler (inventor) (born 1956), Austrian inventor of flexible reflector to concentrate sunlight for solar cooking, etc.

== See also ==
- 2485 Scheffler
- Scheffler Palace (Swedish: Schefflerska palatset)
- Scheffler's owlet

Related surnames

- Scheffel
