= Maurice Müller (footballer) =

German footballer

Personal information
- Date of birth: 12 August 1992 (age 34)
- Place of birth: Nuremberg, Germany
- Height: 1.82 m (6 ft 0 in)
- Position: Wide midfielder

Youth career
- SG Nürnberg Fürth
- 1. FC Nürnberg
- TSV Altenberg
- –2011: Quelle Fürth

Senior career*
Years	Team	Apps	(Gls)
2010–2011	Quelle Fürth	12	(1)
2011–2014	Wacker Burghausen II		
2012–2014	Wacker Burghausen	47	(1)
2014–2015	Schalke 04 II	10	(0)
2015–2016	SpVgg Neckarelz	17	(3)
2016–2019	TSV Steinbach	63	(5)
- * Club domestic league appearances and goals

Maurice Müller (born 12 August 1992) is a German former footballer who played as a wide midfielder.
