= Rüdiger Rehm =

German footballer and coach (born 1978)

Personal information
- Date of birth: 22 November 1978 (age 47)
- Place of birth: Heilbronn, West Germany
- Height: 1.84 m (6 ft 0 in)
- Position: Midfielder

Team information
- Current team: Vitesse (head coach)

Youth career
- Sportfreunde Lauffen
- TV Flein
- –1997: VfR Heilbronn

Senior career*
Years	Team	Apps	(Gls)
1997–2001	SV Waldhof Mannheim	93	(5)
2001–2002	1. FC Saarbrücken	13	(0)
2002–2003	SSV Reutlingen	26	(0)
2003–2005	Erzgebirge Aue	54	(3)
2005–2007	Kickers Offenbach	42	(0)
2007–2008	FSV Oggersheim	17	(0)
2008	TSV Crailsheim	14	(1)
2008–2011	Sonnenhof Großaspach	85	(15)
Total		344	(24)

Managerial career
- 2012–2014: Sonnenhof Großaspach
- 2015–2016: Sonnenhof Großaspach
- 2016: Arminia Bielefeld
- 2017–2021: Wehen Wiesbaden
- 2021–2023: FC Ingolstadt
- 2023–2024: Waldhof Mannheim
- 2025–: Vitesse
- * Club domestic league appearances and goals

Rüdiger Rehm (born 22 November 1978) is a German professional football manager and former player who is the head coach of Dutch club Vitesse. A midfielder during his playing career, Rehm made over 300 senior appearances in German football, primarily with SSV Reutlingen, Waldhof Mannheim and Wehen Wiesbaden.

== Managerial statistics ==
As of match played 28 January 2023

Managerial record by team and tenure
Team	From	To	Record								Ref
Team	From	To	G	W	D	L	GF	GA	GD	Win %	Ref
Sonnenhof Großaspach	29 June 2012	27 October 2014	93	45	25	23	165	112	+53	48.39	
Sonnenhof Großaspach	25 February 2015	15 June 2016	52	21	15	16	73	61	+12	40.38	
Arminia Bielefeld	15 June 2016	22 October 2016	11	0	6	5	12	21	−9	0.00	
Wehen Wiesbaden	13 February 2017	25 October 2021	199	95	37	67	343	260	+83	47.74	
FC Ingolstadt	8 December 2021	31 January 2023	43	15	10	18	58	55	+3	34.88	
Waldhof Mannheim	1 July 2023	31 January 2024	26	8	5	13	40	42	−2	30.77	
Vitesse	1 July 2025	Present	39	15	11	13	68	60	+8	38.46	
Total			463	199	109	155	719	569	+150	42.98	—

== Honours ==
=== Manager ===
Sonnenhof Großaspach

- Regionalliga Südwest: 2013–14
