= Michele Rizzi =

German footballer

Personal information
- Full name: Claudio Michele Rizzi
- Date of birth: 13 April 1988 (age 38)
- Place of birth: Stuttgart, Germany
- Height: 1.81 m (5 ft 11 1/2 in)
- Position: Midfielder

Team information
- Current team: VfL Wolfsburg II

Senior career*
Years	Team	Apps	(Gls)
2009–2011	Stuttgarter Kickers	53	(1)
2011–2016	Sonnenhof Großaspach	165	(40)
2016–2018	Preußen Münster	68	(10)
2018–	VfL Wolfsburg II	0	(0)
- * Club domestic league appearances and goals as of 12:24, 31 July 2018 (UTC)

Claudio Michele Rizzi (born 13 April 1988) is a German professional footballer who plays as a midfielder for VfL Wolfsburg II.

== Personal life ==
Born in Germany, Rizzi is of Italian descent.
