= Marko Kovač (footballer) =

German-Croatian footballer

Personal information
- Date of birth: 6 January 1987 (age 39)
- Place of birth: Böblingen, Germany
- Height: 1.82 m (6 ft 0 in)
- Position: Midfielder

Youth career
- VfL Sindelfingen
- VfB Stuttgart
- SV Böblingen
- –2006: Stuttgarter Kickers

Senior career*
Years	Team	Apps	(Gls)
2006–2009	Stuttgarter Kickers II	72	(8)
2008–2009	Stuttgarter Kickers	1	(0)
2010–2013	SGV Freiberg	64	(5)
2013–2014	TSV Grunbach	28	(10)
2014–2015	1. CfR Pforzheim	20	(3)
- * Club domestic league appearances and goals as of 22:20, 27 September 2017 (UTC)

Marko Kovač (born 6 January 1987) is a German-Croatian former footballer who played as a midfielder.
