= Tom Scheffel =

German footballer

Personal information
- Date of birth: 20 September 1994 (age 32)
- Place of birth: Chemnitz, Germany
- Height: 1.89 m (6 ft 2 in)
- Position: Defensive midfielder

Team information
- Current team: Altglienicke
- Number: 31

Youth career
- USG Chemnitz
- TSV IFA Chemnitz
- –2013: Chemnitzer FC

Senior career*
Years	Team	Apps	(Gls)
2013–2018	Chemnitzer FC	65	(2)
2019	Wormatia Worms	13	(0)
2019–	Altglienicke	1	(0)
- * Club domestic league appearances and goals as of 22:52, 21 August 2019 (UTC)

Tom Scheffel (born 20 September 1994) is a German footballer who currently plays as a midfielder for VSG Altglienicke.

== Career ==
Scheffel came through Chemnitzer FC's youth team, and was promoted to the first team in 2013. He made his 3. Liga debut in August 2013, as a substitute for Kolja Pusch in a 5–3 win over Jahn Regensburg.
