= VfB Stuttgart II =

German football club

- Nickname: Der kleine VfB (The Little VfB)
- Short name: VfB II
- Founded: 1893
- Ground: WIRmachenDRUCK Arena, Aspach
- Capacity: 10,001
- President: Dietmar Allgaier
- Head coach: Nico Willig
- League: 3. Liga
- 2025–26: 3. Liga, 14th of 20
Home colours	Away colours	Third colours

VfB Stuttgart II is a German football team located in Stuttgart, currently playing in the 3. Liga. They are the reserve team of VfB Stuttgart. Until 2005 the team played under the name of VfB Stuttgart Amateure.

== History ==
VfB Stuttgart Amateure first made an appearance at the highest level of local amateur football, the third division Amateurliga Württemberg, in 1959–60, winning the league. The league was split into two regional divisions and the team was grouped in the Amateurliga Nordwürttemberg where it became a dominating side from 1962 to 1967, winning four league titles in five seasons but being barred from promotion to the professional leagues above. The team stayed in this league until 1978, winning one more title in 1971 and generally achieving top of the table finishes but failing to qualify for the new Oberliga Baden-Württemberg by a point when it came sixth and a top five finish was required.

The team's league championships in the Amateurliga and Amateur-Oberliga entitled it to take part in the German amateur football championship, which it won in 1963 and 1980, beating VfL Wolfsburg and FC Augsburg in the finals, while it finished runners-up in 1971 when it lost to SC Jülich 1910.

The team came second in the new Verbandsliga Württemberg in 1979 and was promoted to the Oberliga. It won a championship in this league in its first season there but was again barred from promotion. It came second the season after but suffered relegation in 1988. After two seasons in the Verbandsliga it returned to the Oberliga in 1990. it failed to qualify when the Regionalliga Süd was introduced as the third tier of league football in 1994 but won promotion to this league in 1998 after an Oberliga championship. It dropped back to Oberliga level in 2002 but won another Oberliga title in 2003 and spend the next five seasons in the Regionalliga again. In 2008 the club qualified for the 3. Liga, the new third tier of league football in Germany, where itplayed for the next eight seasons, generally as a mid- and lower table side. At the end of the 2015–16 season the club was relegated to the tier four Regionalliga Südwest after coming last in the 3. Liga.

The team has also qualified for the first round of the German Cup through the Württemberg Cup and has been, at times, quite successful. In their first participation in 1974–75 it reached the quarter finals before going out to Borussia Dortmund. It was knocked out in the first round in 1975–76 and 1980–81 and in the second round in 1981–82. It made another first round exit the year after when it lost to local rival Stuttgarter Kickers. In 2000–01 it defeated Bundesliga side Eintracht Frankfurt 6–1 in the first round before being drawn against its own first team in the second round and losing 3–0. The following season it made another first round exit and, since 2008, is, like all reserve teams in Germany, barred from the competition.

== Relationship with VfB Stuttgart ==
VfB Stuttgart II serves as Stuttgart's reserve team. The team's backbone consists of recent graduates from Stuttgart's youth teams and several established, older players who are not good enough for Stuttgart's first team. Players that are particularly impressive at Stuttgart II are often called up to become permanent members of the first-team. For example, Sami Khedira made 9 league appearances for Stuttgart II in the 2006–07 season, his final one coming on 24 September 2006, before he was called up the first-team; he made his Bundesliga debut on 1 October 2006.

== Ground ==
The Robert-Schlienz-Stadion, offering 5000 places, all standing, was home for the VfB II until 2008 and from 2016 to 2024. It currently hosts the home games of VfB's A and B youth teams. Initially known as the "Amateur-Stadion" (German for amateur stadium), the Robert-Schlienz Stadium got its name in honour of the well-known VfB player Robert Schlienz, after his death in June 1995. The first game played here was in the 2nd round of the youth championship, on 25 June 1995, between the VfB's B youth team and Eintracht Frankfurt's.

As the Robert-Schlienz-Stadion did not meet the requirements for the 3. Liga, VfB Stuttgart II moved to the larger Gazi-Stadion auf der Waldau after promotion in 2008. Following relegation to the Regionalliga Südwest, home matches were once again played at the Robert-Schlienz-Stadion from 2016 onwards. Due to the return to the 3. Liga for the 2024–25 season, the team had to move again and will play its home games in the WIRmachenDRUCK Arena in Aspach, which has a capacity of 10,001 spectators.

== Honours ==
The club's honours:

=== League ===
- German amateur championship
  - Champions: 1963, 1980
  - Runners-up: 1971
- Oberliga Baden-Württemberg (III-IV-V)
  - Champions: 1980, 1998, 2003, 2020
- Amateurliga Württemberg (III)
  - Champions: 1960
- Amateurliga Nordwürttemberg (III)
  - Champions: 1963, 1964, 1965, 1967, 1971
- Verbandsliga Württemberg (IV)
  - Champions: 1990
- Regionalliga Südwest (IV)
  - Champions: 2024

=== Cup ===
- Württemberg Cup
  - Winners: 1970, 1980, 1981, 2000
  - Runners-up: 1974, 1982, 2002

== Recent coaches ==
The recent head coaches of the team:

Manager	Start	Finish
Reinhold Fanz	27 June 2003	30 June 2004
Rainer Adrion	1 July 2004	30 June 2009
Reiner Geyer	1 July 2009	27 January 2010
Jürgen Seeberger	28 January 2010	30 June 2011
Jürgen Kramny	1 July 2011	24 November 2015
Walter Thomae	24 November 2015	30 June 2016
Sebastian Gunkel	1 July 2016	22 November 2016
Walter Thomae	22 November 2016	19 December 2016
Andreas Hinkel	19 December 2016	30 June 2018
Marc Kienle	1 July 2018	1 April 2019
Andreas Hinkel	1 April 2019	30 June 2019
Francisco Vaz	1 July 2019	31 December 2019
Michael Gentner	1 January 2020	30 June 2020
Frank Fahrenhorst	1 July 2020	30 June 2023
Markus Fiedler	1 July 2023	30 June 2025
Nico Willig	1 July 2025	

== Recent seasons ==
The recent season-by-season performance of the club:

Season	Division	Tier	Position
1999–2000	Regionalliga Süd	III	6th
2000–01	Regionalliga Süd	III	2nd
2001–02	Regionalliga Süd	III	16th ↓
2002–03	Oberliga Baden-Württemberg	IV	1st ↑
2003–04	Regionalliga Süd	III	11th
2004–05	Regionalliga Süd	III	13th
2005–06	Regionalliga Süd	III	7th
2006–07	Regionalliga Süd	III	3rd
2007–08	Regionalliga Süd	III	3rd
2008–09	3. Liga	III	11th
2009–10	3. Liga	III	10th
2010–11	3. Liga	III	10th
2011–12	3. Liga	III	11th
2012–13	3. Liga	III	14th
2013–14	3. Liga	III	15th
2014–15	3. Liga	III	13th
2015–16	3. Liga	III	20th ↓
2016–17	Regionalliga Südwest	IV	7th
2017–18	Regionalliga Südwest	IV	10th
2018–19	Regionalliga Südwest	IV	15th ↓
2019–20	Oberliga Baden-Württemberg	V	1st ↑
2020–21	Regionalliga Südwest	IV	8th
2021–22	Regionalliga Südwest	IV	11th
2022–23	Regionalliga Südwest	IV	8th
2023–24	Regionalliga Südwest	IV	1st ↑
2024–25	3. Liga	III	15th
2025–26	3. Liga	III	14th
2026–27	3. Liga	III	

- With the introduction of the Regionalligas in 1994 and the 3. Liga in 2008 as the new third tier, below the 2. Bundesliga, all leagues below dropped one tier.

=== Key ===
↑Promoted	↓ Relegated

== Players ==
=== Current squad ===
As of 3 September 2026

Note: Flags indicate national team as defined under FIFA eligibility rules; some limited exceptions apply. Players may hold more than one non-FIFA nationality.

No.	Pos.	Nation	Player
1	GK	GER	Jerik von der Felsen
4	DF	GER	Maximilian Herwerth
6	DF	GER	Alexander Groiß
7	MF	GER	Lauri Penna
9	FW	NED	Tim van der Leij
10	MF	GER	Nicolás Sessa
11	FW	GER	Oliver Rölke
13	DF	GER	Tim Köhler
16	FW	GER	Jonathan Akaegbobi (on loan from VfL Bochum II)
17	DF	GER	Antonijo Janjic
18	MF	GER	Julian Lüers
21	MF	GER	Neno Zezelj
22	GK	GER	Julian Bock

No.	Pos.	Nation	Player
23	DF	GER	Collin Schramm
24	DF	BEL	Joyeux Masanka Bungi (on loan from RB Leipzig)
28	GK	GER	Dominik Draband
29	DF	GER	Dominik Nothnagel (captain)
30	FW	POL	Jordan Majchrzak
31	MF	GER	Veit Stange
32	DF	GER	Tom Santos
35	DF	AUT	Michael Glück
37	DF	GER	David Preu
38	FW	KOS	Eliot Bujupi
39	FW	KOS	Enis Redzepi
40	DF	GER	Peter Reinhardt
