= SG Sonnenhof Großaspach =

German football club

- Full name: Sportgemeinschaft Sonnenhof Großaspach e.V.
- Nickname: Der Dorfklub (The Village Club)
- Short name: SG
- Founded: 25 August 1994; 32 years ago
- Ground: WIRmachenDRUCK Arena
- Capacity: 10,001
- Chairman: Andreas Benignus
- Head coach: Pascal Reinhardt
- League: 3. Liga
- 2025–26: Regionalliga Südwest, 1st of 18 (promoted)
- Website: sg94.de
Home colours	Away colours

SG Sonnenhof Großaspach (German: Sportgemeinschaft Sonnenhof Großaspach e.V.), commonly known as Sonnenhof Großaspach, is a German professional football club based in Aspach, Baden-Württemberg. The club is currently playing in the 3. Liga for the 2026–27 season, after being promoted from the Regionalliga Südwest, which is the fourth tier of football in the country, in the 2025-26 season.

== History ==
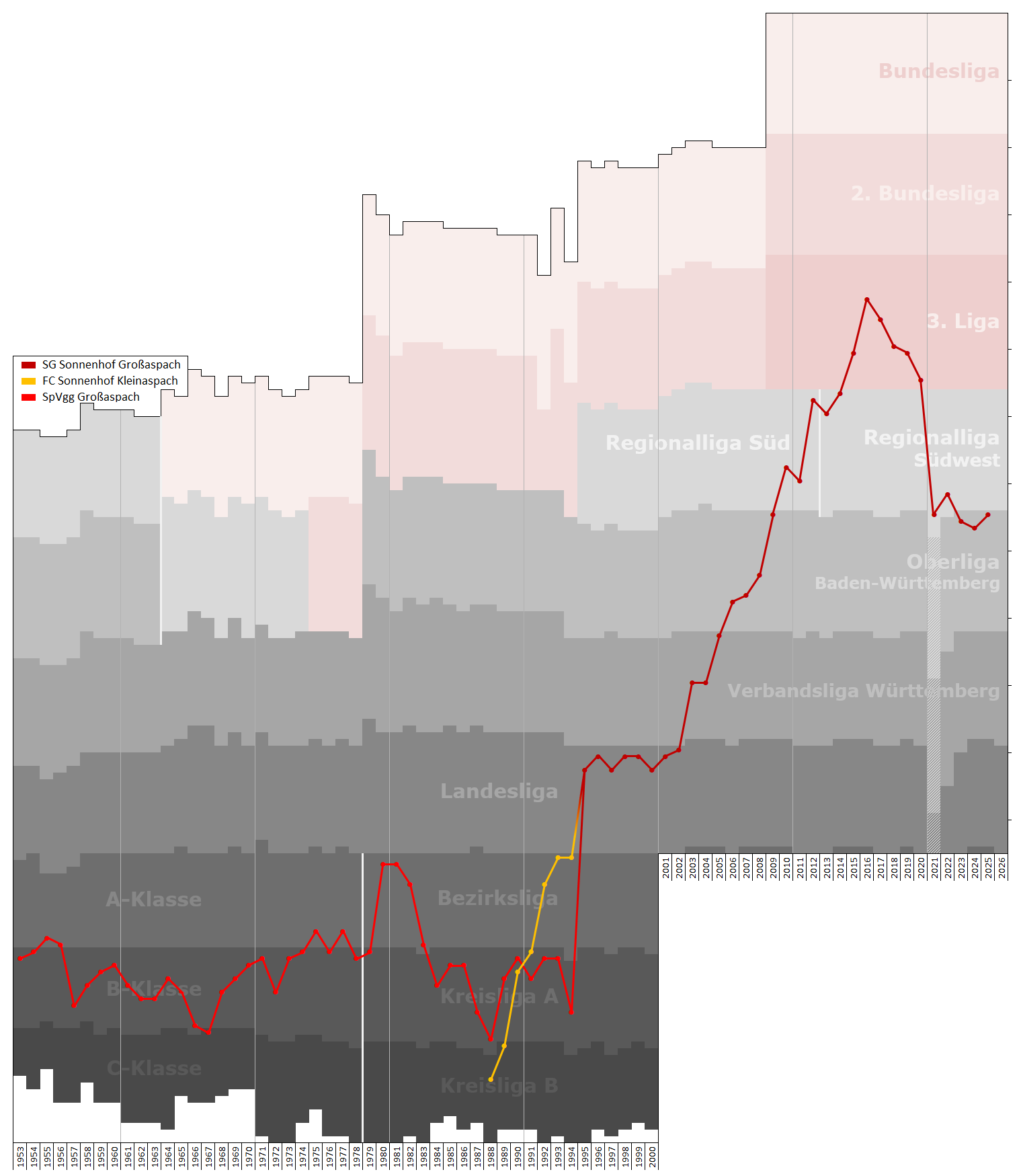
Historical chart of Sonnenhof Großaspach's league performance

The club was formed in 1994 through the union of Spvgg Großaspach and FC Sonnenhof Kleinaspach. The sports club has 1,300 members and, in addition to its football side, has departments for bowling, gymnastics, and table tennis. The term Sonnenhof in the club name comes from the local hotel Sonnenhof in which the meeting was held that resulted in the FC Sonnenhof Kleinaspach was formed.

The footballers have been twice promoted in recent years and reached the Oberliga Baden-Württemberg (IV) in 2005, playing there as a lower table side. In 2008–09, the club achieved its greatest success yet, winning the league and earning the right for promotion to the Regionalliga Süd, where they played until 2012, when the club entered the new Regionalliga Südwest. In 2009, the club qualified for the first time for the first round of the German Cup but was knocked out by VfB Stuttgart after a 1–4 loss, leading 1–0 until the 55th minute.

In 2012–13, the club qualified again for the first round of the German Cup but was knocked out by FSV Frankfurt after a 1–2 loss. The club celebrated its greatest success in 2014 when it won the Regionalliga Südwest and qualified for the promotion round to the 3. Liga, where it overcame VfL Wolfsburg II and earned promotion to the league.

They made back-to-back promotion as they were promoted from Oberliga to Regionalliga Südwest in the 2024-25 season, and again was promoted in the 2025-26-season.

== Honours ==
SG Sonnenhof Großaspach honours
Type	Competition	Titles	Seasons/Years
Domestic	Württemberg Cup	3	2008–09, 2025, 2026
Domestic	Regionalliga Südwest	2	2013–14, 2025–26
Domestic	Oberliga Baden-Württemberg	2	2008–09, 2024–25
Domestic	Verbandsliga Württemberg	1	2004–05
Domestic	Landesliga Württemberg	1	2001–02

== Players ==
=== Current squad ===
As of 3 September 2026

Note: Flags indicate national team as defined under FIFA eligibility rules; some limited exceptions apply. Players may hold more than one non-FIFA nationality.

No.	Pos.	Nation	Player
1	GK	GER	Maximilian Reule
4	MF	GER	Franz Xaver Bleicher (on loan from Augsburg II)
5	DF	GER	Volkan Çeliktaş (captain)
6	MF	GER	Christian Mistl
7	FW	GER	Deli Hajdini
8	DF	GER	Elias Rahn
9	FW	GER	Marlon Faß (on loan from Dynamo Dresden)
10	MF	GER	Lukas Stoppel
11	FW	GER	Tim Rossmann
13	FW	GER	Nikos Zografakis
15	DF	GER	Antonis Aidonis
16	MF	GER	Marius Kunde
17	FW	GER	Lorenz Ender
18	MF	GER	Niklas Pollex

No.	Pos.	Nation	Player
19	DF	GER	Marius Uhl
20	DF	GER	Leon Maier
21	DF	GER	Luca Molinari
22	DF	GER	Benedikt Landwehr
23	FW	GER	Fabian Eisele
24	GK	GER	Robin Dittrich
25	DF	GER	Arbnor Nuraj
27	MF	GER	Loris Maier
28	MF	GER	Noah Santiago Lorch
29	DF	GER	Brooklyn Schwarz
33	GK	GER	Tim Schulz
36	DF	KOS	Mark Gashi
39	FW	GER	Leon Schürer

=== Out on loan ===
Note: Flags indicate national team as defined under FIFA eligibility rules; some limited exceptions apply. Players may hold more than one non-FIFA nationality.

No.	Pos.	Nation	Player
—	MF	GER	Fabio Lettieri (at Normannia Gmünd until 30 June 2027)

== Personnel ==
=== Current technical staff ===
As of 1 July 2023

Position	Name
Head coach	(Germany) Pascal Reinhardt
Assistant coach(es)
Assistant coach(es)	(Germany) Daniel Günay
Assistant coach(es)	(Germany) Julian Schieber
Athletic coach	(Germany) Axel Mäder
Goalkeeping coach	(Germany) Rouven Sattelmaier
Physiotherapist(s)
Physiotherapist(s)	(Germany) Alice Pfitzer
Physiotherapist(s)	(Germany) Florian Ziegler
Physiotherapist(s)	(Germany) Jonas Halder
Physiotherapist(s)	(Germany) Sissi Stättmayer
Doctor(s)	(Germany) Heiko Kachel
Doctor(s)	(Germany) Karsten Reichmann
Doctor(s)	(Germany) Rainer Michelfelder
Kit manager	(Germany) Andreas Jung
Team manager	(Germany) (Kosovo) Nebih Azemi
Team official	(Germany) Harry Anders

=== List of managers ===
This is the list of coaches of SG Sonnenhof Großaspach since 2006:

No.	Name	From	To	Stint
1.	(Germany) Alexander Malchow	1 July 2006	30 June 2007	—N/a
2.	(Germany) Markus Gisdol	1 July 2007	10 November 2007	—N/a
3.	(Germany) Hans-Jürgen Boysen	22 November 2007	5 January 2008	—N/a
4.	(Germany) Thomas Letsch	6 January 2008	30 June 2009	—N/a
5.	(Germany) Jürgen Hartmann	1 July 2009	15 April 2010	—N/a
6.	(Germany) Norbert Gundelsweiler	1 May 2010	30 June 2010	—N/a
7.	(Germany) Alexander Zorniger	1 July 2010	30 June 2012	—N/a
8.	(Germany) Rüdiger Rehm	1 July 2012	28 October 2014	1st
9.	(Germany) Uwe Rapolder	28 October 2014	25 February 2015	—N/a
10.	(Germany) Rüdiger Rehm	25 February 2015	27 June 2016	2nd
11.	(Germany) Oliver Zapel	27 June 2016	30 June 2017	1st
12.	(Germany) Sascha Hildmann	1 July 2017	5 October 2018	—N/a
13.	(Croatia) (Germany) Zlatko Blaškić	5 October 2018	17 October 2018	Caretaker
14.	(Germany) Florian Schnorrenberg	17 October 2018	6 May 2019	—N/a
15.	(Germany) Markus Lang	6 May 2019	30 June 2019	—N/a
16.	(Germany) Oliver Zapel	1 July 2019	16 December 2019	2nd
17.	(Germany) Markus Lang	16 December 2019	3 January 2020	Caretaker
18.	(Germany) Mike Sadlo (Germany) Heiner Backhaus	3 January 2020	26 February 2020	Caretaker
19.	(Germany) Hans-Jürgen Boysen	26 February 2020	25 February 2021	2nd
20.	(Germany) Walter Thomae	26 February 2021	9 May 2021	1st
21.	(Germany) Rainer Scharinger	11 May 2021	30 June 2021	Caretaker
22.	(Germany) Steffen Weiß	1 July 2021	8 December 2021	1st
23.	(Germany) Hans-Jürgen Boysen	7 January 2022	30 June 2022	3rd
24.	(Greece) Evangelos Sbonias	1 July 2022	30 June 2023	1st
25.	(Germany) Pascal Reinhardt	1 July 2023	present	1st

== Statistics ==
=== Recent seasons ===
This is the list of recent season-by-season performance of the club since 2001–02 season:

Season	Division	Tier	Position
2001–02	Landesliga Württemberg	VI	↑
2002–03	Verbandsliga Württemberg	V	8th
2003–04	Verbandsliga Württemberg	V	8th
2004–05	Verbandsliga Württemberg	V	1st ↑
2005–06	Oberliga Baden-Württemberg	IV	14th
2006–07	Oberliga Baden-Württemberg	IV	13th
2007–08	Oberliga Baden-Württemberg	IV	10th
2008–09	Oberliga Baden-Württemberg	V	1st ↑
2009–10	Regionalliga Süd	IV	12th
2010–11	Regionalliga Süd	IV	14th
2011–12	Regionalliga Süd	IV	2nd
2012–13	Regionalliga Südwest	IV	4th
2013–14	Regionalliga Südwest	IV	1st ↑

Season	Division	Tier	Position
2014–15	3. Liga	III	15th
2015–16	3. Liga	III	7th
2016–17	3. Liga	III	10th
2017–18	3. Liga	III	14th
2018–19	3. Liga	III	15th
2019–20	3. Liga	III	19th ↓
2020–21	Regionalliga Südwest	IV	19th
2021–22	Regionalliga Südwest	IV	16th ↓
2022–23	Oberliga Baden-Württemberg	V	2nd
2023–24	Oberliga Baden-Württemberg	V	3rd
2024–25	Oberliga Baden-Württemberg	V	1st ↑
2025–26	Regionalliga Südwest	IV	1st ↑

- With the introduction of the Regionalligas in 1994 and the 3. Liga in 2008 as the new third tier, below the 2. Bundesliga, all leagues below dropped one tier. In 2012, the number of Regionalligas was increased from three to five with all Regionalliga Süd clubs except the Bavarian ones entering the new Regionalliga Südwest.
