= 2017–18 TSV 1860 Munich season =

1860 Munich
2017–18 season
- Chairman: Hasan Ismaik
- Head Coach: Daniel Bierofka
- Stadium: Allianz Arena
- Regionalliga Bayern: 1st Champions
- DFB-Pokal: First round
- Bavarian Cup: Quarter-Final
- Top goalscorer: League: Sascha Mölders (19); All: Sascha Mölders (24)
- Highest home attendance: 12,500 vs Wacker Burghausen (21 July 2017); 12,500 vs 1860 Rosenheim (29 July 2017); 12,500 vs FC Ingolstadt (13 August 2017); 12,500 vs Ingolstadt 04 II (1 September 2017); 12,500 vs Greuther Fürth II (15 September 2017); 12,500 vs Pipinsried (6 October 2017); 12,500 vs Bayern Munich II (22 October 2017); 12,500 vs Memmingen (3 November 2017); 12,500 vs Schalding-Heining (1 December 2017); 12,500 vs TSV Buchbach (6 March 2018); 12,500 vs SV Seligenporten (9 March 2018); 12,500 vs Unterföhring (14 March 2018); 12,500 vs VfR Garching (23 March 2018); 12,500 vs VfB Eichstätt (14 April 2018); 12,500 vs Augsburg II (21 April 2018); 12,500 vs FC Saarbrücken (27 May 2018)
- Lowest home attendance: 6,900 vs Unterföhring (5 September 2017)
- Average home league attendance: 11,761
Home colours	Away colours	Third colours

The 2017–18 TSV 1860 Munich season was the club's 1st season in the Regionalliga Bayern following their demotion at the end of the previous season.

== Season events ==
On 2 June, 1860 announced that they had not received a license to play in the 2017–18 3. Liga.

On 11 June, 1860 were drawn against FC Ingolstadt in the First round of the 2017–18 DFB-Pokal.

On 16 June, 1860 confirmed that they had received a license from Bavarian Football Association, and would participate in the Regionalliga Bayern for the 2017–18 season.

On 19 June, 1860 announced that Marin Pongračić had left the club to sign for Red Bull Salzburg.

On 30 June, 1860 announced that Felix Uduokhai had left the club to sign for VfL Wolfsburg.

On 7 July, 1860 announced that they had signed a new one-year contract with Sascha Mölders, and the signing of Alexander Strobl from TSV Buchbach on a contract until 30 June 2018.

On 12 July, 1860 announced that Moritz Heinrich had left the club to sign for Preußen Münster.

On 10 August, 1860 announced the return of Markus Ziereis and Phillipp Steinhart to the club, with Steinhart signing on until June 2019 from Sportfreunde Lotte and Ziereis signing from Jahn Regensburg until June 2020.

On 30 August, 1860 announced that Kilian Jakob had left the club to sign for Augsburg.

On 31 August, 1860 announced the signing of Hendrik Bonmann from Borussia Dortmund on a contract until June 2020, whilst Lino Tempelmann left the club to sign for Freiburg.

On 4 September, 1860 confirmed that Daniel Adlung had turned down a new contract and had left the club.

On 29 January, 1860 announced the signing of Michael Görlitz from Arminia Bielefeld, on a contract until the end of the season with an option for an additional year.

On 5 February, 1860 announced that Martin Gamboš had joined MŠK Žilina on loan for the remainder of the season.

On 14 February, 1860 announced that György Hursán had joined Békéscsaba 1912 Előre on loan for the remainder of the season.

On 11 April, 1860 announced that they had signed Alessandro Abruscia, Kristian Böhnlein, Herbert Paul and Marius Willsch for the upcoming 2018–19 season.

On 5 May, 1860 clinched the league title with a 3-0 win away to Pipinsried.

On 4 June, 1860 signed a new contract with Sascha Mölders.

== Squad ==
As of match played 27 May 2018

No.	Name	Nationality	Position	Date of birth (age)	Signed from	Signed in	Contract ends	Apps.	Goals
Goalkeepers
1	Marco Hiller	(Germany)	GK	20 February 1997 (aged 21)	Academy	2015		35	0
37	Alexander Strobl	(Austria)	GK	22 February 1993 (aged 25)	TSV Buchbach	2017	2018	4	0
38	Hendrik Bonmann	(Germany)	GK	22 January 1994 (aged 24)	Borussia Dortmund	2017	2020	4	0
Defenders
2	Eric Weeger	(Germany)	DF	2 February 1997 (aged 21)	Acadmey	2017		34	1
4	Felix Weber	(Germany)	DF	18 January 1995 (aged 23)	Academy	2016		34	3
6	Jan Mauersberger	(Germany)	DF	17 June 1985 (aged 32)	Karlsruher SC	2016	2018	70	7
11	Christian Köppel	(Germany)	DF	3 November 1994 (aged 23)	Academy	2017		37	4
17	Daniel Wein	(Germany)	DF	5 February 1994 (aged 24)	Wehen Wiesbaden	2017		37	4
22	Aaron Berzel	(Germany)	DF	29 May 1992 (aged 25)	SV Elversberg	2017		34	1
36	Phillipp Steinhart	(Germany)	DF	7 July 1992 (aged 25)	Sportfreunde Lotte	2017	2019	32	1
44	Leon Klassen	(Russia)	DF	29 May 2000 (aged 17)	Academy	2016		1	0
Midfielders
5	Nicolas Andermatt	(Switzerland)	MF	6 November 1995 (aged 22)	SV Wacker Burghausen	2017		24	2
8	Simon Seferings	(Germany)	MF	5 July 1995 (aged 22)	SV Heimstetten	2015		13	3
10	Timo Gebhart	(Germany)	MF	12 April 1989 (aged 29)	Hansa Rostock	2017		54	10
14	Dennis Dressel	(Germany)	MF	26 October 1998 (aged 19)	Academy	2017		1	1
16	Benjamin Kindsvater	(Germany)	MF	8 February 1993 (aged 25)	Wacker Burghausen	2017		31	4
21	Uğur Mustafa Türk	(Turkey)	MF	24 June 1997 (aged 20)	Academy	2017		16	0
25	Lucas Genkinger	(Germany)	MF	14 March 1995 (aged 23)	VfR Garching	2015		3	0
27	Michael Görlitz	(Germany)	MF	8 March 1987 (aged 31)	Arminia Bielefeld	2018	2018 (+1)	8	0
31	Kodjovi Koussou	(Togo)	MF	22 June 1992 (aged 25)	Bayern Munich II	2016		29	1
Forwards
7	Mohamad Awata	(Syria)	FW	10 July 1993 (aged 24)	Al-Wahda	2017		2	1
9	Sascha Mölders	(Germany)	FW	20 March 1985 (aged 32)	Augsburg	2016		75	31
18	Nico Karger	(Germany)	FW	1 February 1993 (aged 24)	Academy	2015		58	20
20	Tobias Steer	(Germany)	FW	17 February 1998 (aged 20)	SpVgg Landshut	2017		2	0
23	Nicholas Helmbrecht	(Germany)	FW	30 January 1995 (aged 23)	1860 Rosenheim	2015		22	2
24	Markus Ziereis	(Germany)	FW	26 August 1992 (aged 25)	Jahn Regensburg	2017	2020	37	16
33	Felix Bachschmid	(Germany)	FW	25 September 1996 (aged 21)	Academy	2017		18	4
Out on loan
15	Martin Gamboš	(Slovakia)	MF	23 January 1998 (aged 20)	Academy	2017		1	0
29	György Hursán	(Hungary)	MF	5 February 1997 (aged 21)	Academy	2017		6	0
Left during the season
26	Kilian Jakob	(Germany)	DF	25 January 1998 (aged 20)	Academy	2016		11	2
28	Lino Tempelmann	(Germany)	MF	2 February 1999 (aged 19)	Academy	2017		8	0

== Transfers ==
=== In ===
Date	Position	Nationality	Name	From	Fee	Ref.
7 July 2017	GK	(Austria)	Alexander Strobl	TSV Buchbach	Undisclosed	
10 August 2017	DF	(Germany)	Phillipp Steinhart	Sportfreunde Lotte	Undisclosed	
10 August 2017	FW	(Germany)	Markus Ziereis	Jahn Regensburg	Undisclosed	
31 August 2017	GK	(Germany)	Hendrik Bonmann	Borussia Dortmund	Free	
29 January 2018	MF	(Germany)	Michael Görlitz	Arminia Bielefeld	Free	

=== Out ===
Date	Position	Nationality	Name	To	Fee	Ref.
19 June 2017	DF	(Croatia)	Marin Pongračić	Red Bull Salzburg	Undisclosed	
30 June 2017	DF	(Germany)	Felix Uduokhai	VfL Wolfsburg	Undisclosed	
12 July 2017	MF	(Germany)	Moritz Heinrich	Preußen Münster	Undisclosed	
31 August 2017	MF	(Germany)	Lino Tempelmann	Freiburg	Undisclosed	

=== Loans out ===
Start date	Position	Nationality	Name	To	End date	Ref.
5 February 2018	MF	(Slovakia)	Martin Gamboš	MŠK Žilina	30 June 2017	
14 February 2018	MF	(Hungary)	György Hursán	Békéscsaba 1912 Előre	30 June 2017	

=== Released ===
Date	Position	Nationality	Name	Joined	Date	Ref
4 September 2017	MF	(Germany)	Daniel Adlung	Adelaide United		

== Friendlies ==
17 June 2017	FC Hertha Munich	0–7	1860 Munich	Munich
15:00 CEST (UTC+2)	Pichler (yellow card); Altstädtler (yellow card)	Report	Heinrich 46'; Türk 47'; Wein 57'; Köppel 61'; Bachschmid 71' (pen.); Kindsvater 80', 86'	Stadium: District sports complex Surheimer Weg; Attendance: 1,500; Referee: Ben-Erik Salb

18 June 2017	FC Eintracht München	0–14	1860 Munich	Munich
18:00 CEST (UTC+2)		Report	Bachschmid 23', 39'; Kindsvater 29', 36'; Dressel 34'; Heinrich 35'; Weeger 40'; Genkinger 42'; Andermatt 53'; Aigner 59'; Karger 66', 84'; Helmbrecht 67'; Gamboš 87'	Stadium: Bezirkssportanlage Ebereschenstraße; Attendance: 1,500; Referee: Philipp Eisenmann

21 June 2017	SV Pullach	0–0	1860 Munich	Pullach
18:00 CEST (UTC+2)	Dotzler (yellow card)	Report		Stadium: Gistlstraße Stadium; Attendance: 1,000; Referee: Michael Bacher

24 June 2017	1860 Munich	4–0	Augsburg II	Winterlingen
17:00 CEST (UTC+2)	Helmbrecht 35'; Awata 48', 60'; Türk 89' (pen.)	Report		Stadium: Steigleweg Stadium; Attendance: 500; Referee: Andreas Rinderknecht

25 June 2017	VfB Stuttgart II	0–2	1860 Munich	Winterlingen
14:30 CEST (UTC+2)		Report	Andermatt 10'; Bachschmid 84'	Stadium: Steigleweg Stadium; Attendance: 500; Referee: Philipp Lehmann

28 June 2017	1860 Munich	3–0	USK Anif	Obertraun
17:00 CEST (UTC+2)	Helmbrecht 31'; Karger 34'; Gebhart 41' (pen.)	Report		Stadium: BSFZ Obertraun; Attendance: 400; Referee: Christian Greinecker

1 July 2017	Liefering	1–0	1860 Munich	Obertraun
14:00 CEST (UTC+2)	Jakob 90' (0.g.)	Report		Stadium: BSFZ Obertraun; Attendance: 400; Referee: Sebastian Gishammer

5 July 2017	SpVgg Landshut	2–2	1860 Munich	Landshut
19:00 CEST (UTC+2)	Steffel 41'; Winterling 72'	Report	Karger 8' (pen.); Aigner 79'; Berzel (yellow card)	Stadium: ebmpapststadion Attendance: 2,200; Referee: Thomas Berg

6 July 2017	SE Freising	0–4	1860 Munich	Freising
19:00 CEST (UTC+2)	Zeka (yellow card)	Report	Bachschmid 8', 30'; Wein 28'; Kindsvater 85'	Stadium: Stadion Savoyer; Attendance: 3,000; Referee: Pantelis Gitopoulos

8 July 2017	1860 Munich	4–0	SV Heimstetten	Munich
17:00 CEST (UTC+2)	Mauersberger 15'; Kindsvater 29'; Mölders 43'; Karger 44'	Report		Stadium: Grünwalder Stadion; Attendance: 1,860; Referee: Fabian Kilger

13 January 2018	1860 Munich	1–0	Chemie Leipzig	Munich
18:00 CEST (UTC+2)	Türk 5'	Report		Stadium: Grünwalder Stadion; Attendance: 5,450; Referee: Michael Bacher

17 January 2018	1860 Munich	2–3	Wacker Innsbruck	Munich
14:30 CEST (UTC+2)	Ziereis 1'; Mölders 33'	Report	Harrer 7'; Gabriele 13'; Chaïbi 21'	Stadium: 1860 Munich Training Ground; Attendance: 120; Referee: Julian Kraye

20 January 2018	1860 Munich	1–0	Memmingen	Munich
13:00 CEST (UTC+2)	Helmbrecht 29'	Report		Stadium: 1860 Munich Training Ground; Attendance: 120; Referee: Julian Kraye

24 January 2018	1860 Munich	11–0	SV Wörgl	Munich
19:30 CEST (UTC+2)	Ziereis 8', 30', 36', 39'; Mölders 20', 34'; Koussou 44'; Aigner 48'; Bachschmid 54', 81'; Zimmermann 69'	Report		Stadium: 1860 Munich Training Ground; Attendance: 150; Referee: Benedikt Öllinger

27 January 2018	SC Fürstenfeldbruck	0–7	1860 Munich	Fürstenfeldbruck
14:00 CEST (UTC+2)		Report	Ziereis 7', 36', 44'; Mölders 10'; Türk 64'; Bachschmid 76'; Zimmermann 78'	Stadium: Stadion an der Klosterstraße; Attendance: 1,100; Referee: Luka Beretic

6 February 2018	1860 Munich	1–0	Zagłębie Sosnowiec	Valencia, Spain
15:30 CEST (UTC+2)	Bachschmid 52'	Report		Stadium: Oliva Nova Beach & Golf Resort; Attendance: 100; Referee: Oscar Ruiz Garcia

6 February 2018	1860 Munich	2–1	Beijing Renhe	Valencia, Spain
15:30 CEST (UTC+2)	Seferings 8'; 76' (o.g.)	Report	Baojie 23'	Stadium: Oliva Nova Beach & Golf Resort; Attendance: 100; Referee: Joan Mateo Senon

15 February 2018	1860 Munich	2–1	Austria Lustenau	Munich
13:00 CEST (UTC+2)	Koussou 45'; Kindsvater 56'	Report	Ronivaldo 51'	Stadium: 1860 Munich Training Ground; Attendance: 60; Referee: Julian Kraye

16 February 2018	1860 Munich	1–0	Austria Lustenau	Munich
14:30 CEST (UTC+2)	Niemann 55'	Report		Stadium: 1860 Munich Training Ground; Attendance: 200; Referee: Florian Böhm

== Competitions ==
=== Overall record ===
Competition	First match	Last match	Starting round	Final position	Record							
Competition	First match	Last match	Starting round	Final position	Pld	W	D	L	GF	GA	GD	Win %
Regionalliga Bayern	13 July 2017	12 May 2018	Matchday 1	1st	36	26	5	5	87	27	+60	72.22
Promotion play-off	24 May 2018	27 May 2018	1st leg	Promoted	2	1	1	0	5	4	+1	50.00
DFB-Pokal	13 August 2017	13 August 2017	First Round	First Round	3	1	1	1	1	2	−1	33.33
Bavarian Cup	9 August 2017	2 April 2018	First Round	Quarter-Final	4	3	0	1	16	2	+14	75.00
Total					45	31	7	7	109	35	+74	68.89

Last updated: 27 May 2018
Source: Competitions

=== Regionalliga Bayern ===
==== League table ====
Pos	Team	Pld	W	D	L	GF	GA	GD	Pts	Qualification or relegation
1	1860 Munich (C, O, P)	36	26	5	5	87	27	+60	83	Qualification to promotion play-offs and DFB-Pokal
2	Bayern Munich II	36	22	8	6	84	41	+43	74	
3	Schweinfurt 05	36	20	8	8	79	52	+27	68	
4	VfR Garching	36	17	5	14	67	67	0	56	
5	1. FC Nürnberg II	36	17	4	15	70	61	+9	55	
6	FC Ingolstadt II	36	16	5	15	68	57	+11	53	
7	VfB Eichstätt	36	14	10	12	55	56	−1	52	
8	FC Augsburg II	36	14	8	14	55	44	+11	50	
9	Wacker Burghausen	36	14	8	14	53	49	+4	50	
10	FV Illertissen	36	12	13	11	50	50	0	49	
11	SV Schalding-Heining	36	15	4	17	59	72	−13	49	
12	TSV Buchbach	36	12	10	14	50	56	−6	46	
13	Greuther Fürth II	36	13	7	16	44	51	−7	46	
14	FC Pipinsried	36	11	11	14	43	62	−19	44	
15	1860 Rosenheim	36	9	14	13	43	55	−12	41	
16	FC Memmingen (O)	36	10	9	17	47	58	−11	39	Qualification to relegation play-offs
17	SpVgg Bayreuth (O)	36	11	5	20	53	79	−26	38	Qualification to relegation play-offs
18	SV Seligenporten (R)	36	9	9	18	39	58	−19	36	Relegation to Bayernliga
19	FC Unterföhring (Note: FC Unterföhring did not apply for a Regionalliga license for next season and will therefore be relegated.) (R)	36	3	11	22	36	87	−51	20	Relegation to Bayernliga

Source: kicker.de
Rules for classification: 1) Points; 2) Goal difference; 3) Goals scored
(C) Champions; (O) Play-off winners; (P) Promoted; (R) Relegated

==== Results summary ====
Overall								Home						Away					
Pld	W	D	L	GF	GA	GD	Pts	W	D	L	GF	GA	GD	W	D	L	GF	GA	GD
36	26	5	5	87	27	+60	83	15	2	1	47	9	+38	11	3	4	40	18	+22

Last updated: 12 May 2018.

==== Results by round ====
Round	1	2	3	4	6	5	7	8	9	10	11	12	13	14	15	16	17	19	20	21	23	24	25	22	27	31	29	30	32	33	28	35	26	36	34	38
Ground	A	H	A	H	H	A	H	A	H	A	H	A	H	A	H	A	H	H	H	A	A	H	A	H	H	H	H	A	A	H	A	H	A	A	A	A
Result	W	W	L	W	W	W	W	D	D	W	W	W	W	W	W	L	L	W	W	L	D	W	D	W	W	W	W	W	W	W	W	D	W	L	W	W
Position	2	2	2	1	1	1	1	1	1	1	1	1	1	1	1	1	1	1	1	1	1	1	1	1	1	1	1	1	1	1	1	1	1	1	1	1
Points	3	6	6	9	12	15	18	19	20	23	26	29	32	35	38	38	38	41	44	44	45	48	49	52	55	58	61	64	67	70	73	74	77	77	80	83

Updated to match(es) played on 12 May 2018. Source:
A = Away; H = Home; W = Win; D = Draw; L = Loss

==== Results ====
13 July 2017 1	Memmingen	1–4	1860 Munich	Memmingen
19:00 CEST (UTC+2)	Schad (yellow card) 14'; Zweckbronner (yellow card) 21'; Lutz (yellow card) 75'; Nikolic (yellow card) 82'; Krogler 85'	Report	Köppel 11' (yellow card) 89'; Weber (yellow card) 44'; Karger 50'; Gebhart 72'; Mölders (yellow card) 79'; Helmbrecht 90'	Stadium: e-con ArenaPark; Attendance: 5,000; Referee: Michael Emmer

21 July 2017 2	1860 Munich	3–1	Wacker Burghausen	Munich
19:00 CEST (UTC+2)	Mauersberger 49'; Mölders (yellow card) 54' (goal) 84'; Wein (yellow card) 58'; Gebhart 61'	Report	Buchner (yellow card) 24'; Janietz 33' (yellow card) 79'; Pichler (yellow card) 34'; Wächter (yellow card) 86'	Stadium: Grünwalder Stadion; Attendance: 12,500; Referee: Lothar Ostheimer

26 July 2017 3	TSV Buchbach	1–0	1860 Munich	Buchbach
19:00 CEST (UTC+2)	Weber 10' (o.g.); Bauer (yellow card) 81'; Petrović (yellow card) 90'; Hain (red card) 90+4'	Report	Weeger (yellow card) 63'; Weber (yellow card) 66'	Stadium: SMR-Arena; Attendance: 2,700; Referee: Christian Dietz

29 July 2017 4	1860 Munich	2–0	1860 Rosenheim	Munich
14:00 CEST (UTC+2)	Jakob (yellow card) 44'; Heiß 89' (o.g.); Gebhart 90+4'	Report	Räuber (yellow card) 31'; Köhler (yellow card) 33'; Einsiedler (yellow card) 40'; Denz (yellow card) 46'; Maier (yellow card) 80'; Krätschmer (yellow card) 86'	Stadium: Grünwalder Stadion; Attendance: 12,500; Referee: Andreas Hartl

1 August 2017 6	1860 Munich	5–3	FC Nürnberg II	Munich
14:00 CEST (UTC+2)	Mölders 13'; Gebhart 49'; Weber 53'; Karger (yellow card) 55' (goal) 89'; Berzel (yellow card) 65'; Heußer 87' (o.g.)	Report	Fuchs (yellow card) 7' (goal) 63'; Hofmann 16'; Eder (yellow card) 52'; Hercher 56'	Stadium: Grünwalder Stadion; Attendance: 0 Referee: Markus Pflaum
Note: Match played behind closed doors.

5 August 2017 5	Schalding-Heining	1–4	1860 Munich	Passau
14:00 CEST (UTC+2)	Brückl (yellow card) 13'; Alagöz (yellow card) 57'; Enzesberger (yellow card) 70' (goal) 88'; Tiefenbrunner (yellow card) 90'	Report	Mölders (yellow card) 33' (goal) 66'; Karger 45+3', 90+2'; Jakob 60'; Berzel (yellow card) 90'	Stadium: Städtische Sportanlage; Attendance: 2,760; Referee: Florian Kornblum

17 August 2017 7	1860 Munich	5–0	FV Illertissen	Munich
19:00 CEST (UTC+2)	Mölders 31', 40'; Gebhart 45+2' (pen.); Jakob 56'; Köppel 58'	Report	Allgaier (yellow card) 69'	Stadium: Grünwalder Stadion; Attendance: 12,200; Referee: Florian Badstübner

26 August 2017 8	SV Seligenporten	0–0	1860 Munich	Pyrbaum
16:00 CEST (UTC+2)	Weber (yellow card); Herzel (yellow card); Neuerer (yellow card)	Report	Mölders (yellow card); Jakob (yellow card)	Stadium: MAR Arena; Attendance: 3,481; Referee: Marco Achmüller

1 September 2017 9	1860 Munich	0–0	Ingolstadt 04 II	Munich
19:00 CEST (UTC+2)	Steinhart (yellow card) 67'; Berzel (yellow card) 71'; Wein (yellow card) 90'	Report	Nicklas (yellow card) 77'; Langen (yellow card) 82'	Stadium: Grünwalder Stadion; Attendance: 12,500; Referee: Wolfgang Haslberger

9 September 2017 10	VfR Garching	0–3	1860 Munich	Garching
14:00 CEST (UTC+2)	Tunc (yellow card) 40'; Niebauer (yellow card) 59'	Report	Karger 22', 31'; Mölders 58'; Wein (yellow card) 63'; Berzel (yellow card) 65'	Stadium: Stadion am See; Attendance: 3,000; Referee: Matthias Zacher

15 September 2017 11	1860 Munich	1–0	Greuther Fürth II	Munich
19:00 CEST (UTC+2)	Berzel (yellow card) 8'; Mölders (yellow card) 49'; Wein (yellow card) 61' (goal) 79'	Report	Derflinger (yellow card) 24'; Sollfrank (yellow card) 36'; Ammari (yellow card) 41'	Stadium: Grünwalder Stadion; Attendance: 12,500; Referee: Tobias Schultes

23 September 2017 12	Unterföhring	0–3	1860 Munich	Kirchheim bei München
14:00 CEST (UTC+2)	Kain (yellow card) 38'; Büchel (yellow card) 53'; Kostorz (yellow card) 59'; Eder (yellow card) 62'; Hofmaier (yellow card) 76'	Report	Weeger 31'; Ziereis 37'; Karger 50'	Stadium: ATS Sportpark Heimstetten; Attendance: 2,500; Referee: Patrick Hanslbauer

30 September 2017 13	1860 Munich	3–1	FC Schweinfurt 05	Munich
14:00 CEST (UTC+2)	Ziereis 6'; Mölders 13', 85'; Weeger (yellow card) 40'; Helmbrecht (yellow card) (yellow-red card) 56'; Köppel (yellow card) 75'; Berzel (yellow card) 81'	Report	Fery 32'; Paul (yellow card) 61'; Billick (yellow card) 64'; Krautschneider (yellow card) 68'	Stadium: Grünwalder Stadion; Attendance: 12,200; Referee: Steffen Grimmeißen

3 October 2017 14	VfB Eichstätt	1–2	1860 Munich	Eichstätt
14:00 CEST (UTC+2)	Schäll 4'; Schraufstetter (yellow card) 23'; Eberle (yellow card) 63'; Kügel (yellow card) 90'; Scintu (yellow card) 90'	Report	Wein (yellow card) 57'; Ziereis 62'; Karger 72'	Stadium: Liqui-Moly-Stadion; Attendance: 2,830; Referee: Roman Potemkin

6 October 2017 15	1860 Munich	3–0	Pipinsried	Munich
19:00 CEST (UTC+2)	Andermatt 1' (yellow card) 54'; Berzel (yellow card) 15'; Grassow 32' (o.g.); Karger 66'	Report	Tosun (yellow card) 25'; Müller (yellow card) 38'	Stadium: Grünwalder Stadion; Attendance: 12,500; Referee: Marco Achmüller

15 October 2017 16	Augsburg II	3–2	1860 Munich	Augsburg
15:00 CEST (UTC+2)	Richter (yellow card) 29'; Bekiroğlu 42', 66' (yellow card) 44'; Mergel 61'	Report	Mölders (yellow card) 23'; Helmbrecht (yellow card) 51'; Andermatt (yellow card) 60'; Ziereis 65'; Helmbrecht 82'	Stadium: Augsburg Arena; Attendance: 21,219; Referee: Markus Pflaum

22 October 2017 17	1860 Munich	0–1	Bayern Munich II	Munich
15:00 CEST (UTC+2)	Andermatt (yellow card) 37'; Karger (yellow card) 44'; Mölders (yellow card) 59'; Wein (yellow card) 60'; Helmbrecht (red card) 86'	Report	Awoudja (yellow card) 13'; Obermair (yellow card) 32'; Benko 74'	Stadium: Grünwalder Stadion; Attendance: 12,500; Referee: Christian Dietz

31 October 2017 19	1860 Munich	3–0	SpVgg Bayreuth	Munich
14:05 CET (UTC+1)	Mauersberger 36'; Ziereis 41'; Berzel (yellow card) 58'; Mölders 89'	Report		Stadium: Grünwalder Stadion; Attendance: 12,300; Referee: Thomas Stein

3 November 2017 20	1860 Munich	2–0	Memmingen	Munich
19:00 CET (UTC+1)	Karger 32'; Weber 35'; Ziereis (yellow card) 51'	Report	Zweckbronner (yellow card) 42'; Lutz (yellow card) 54'	Stadium: Grünwalder Stadion; Attendance: 12,500; Referee: Thomas Berg

11 November 2017 21	Wacker Burghausen	2–0	1860 Munich	Burghausen
14:00 CET (UTC+1)	Wächter (yellow card) 32'; Buchner 53'; Marinkovic 74'	Report	Karger (yellow card) 74'; Steinhart (yellow card) 75'	Stadium: Wacker-Arena; Attendance: 8,520; Referee: Benjamin Cortus

26 November 2017 23	1860 Rosenheim	1–1	1860 Munich	Rosenheim
14:00 CET (UTC+1)	Höhensteiger (yellow card) 21'; Maier 44'; Krätschmer (yellow card) 66'	Report	Berzel (yellow card) 43'; Köppel 48'; Weber (yellow card) 50'; Mauersberger (yellow card) 53'	Stadium: Jahnstadion; Attendance: 3,900; Referee: Florian Kornblum

1 December 2017 24	1860 Munich	3–0	Schalding-Heining	Munich
19:00 CET (UTC+1)	Ziereis 6'; Köppel 28'; Steinhart (yellow card) 32'; Kindsvater 40'	Report	Gallmaier (yellow card) 44'; Krenn (yellow card) 83'	Stadium: Grünwalder Stadion; Attendance: 12,500; Referee: Andreas Hummel

24 February 2018 25	FC Nürnberg II	2–2	1860 Munich	Nuremberg
13:00 CET (UTC+1)	Hufnagel (yellow card) 28'; Krauß (yellow card) 31'; Engelhardt 43'; Hofmann (yellow card) 64'; Fuchs 75' (yellow card) 90'	Report	Seferings 4'; Berzel (yellow card) 16'; Mölders 27'; Weber (yellow card) (yellow-red card) 69'	Stadium: Max-Morlock-Stadion; Attendance: 17,689; Referee: Eduard Beitinger

6 March 2018 22	1860 Munich	2–1	TSV Buchbach	Munich
20:00 CET (UTC+1)	Ziereis 16'; Seferings (yellow card) 44'; Mölders (yellow card) 52'; Mauersberger 90+4'	Report	Hain (yellow card) 15'; Drum (yellow card) 18'; Leberfinger (yellow card) 28' (goal) 44'; Grübl (yellow card) 35'; Bauer (yellow card) 66'	Stadium: Grünwalder Stadion; Attendance: 12,500; Referee: Florian Badstübner
Note: Match originally scheduled for 27 February, but postponed due to bad weather.

9 March 2018 27	1860 Munich	3–0	SV Seligenporten	Munich
19:00 CET (UTC+1)	Ziereis 22', 77'; Andermatt (yellow card) 48'; Mölders (yellow card) 74'; Steinhart 86'	Report	Weber (yellow card) 40'; Götzendörfer (yellow card) 81'	Stadium: Grünwalder Stadion; Attendance: 12,500; Referee: Lothar Ostheimer

14 March 2018 31	1860 Munich	2–0	Unterföhring	Munich
19:00 CET (UTC+1)	Ziereis 2'; Mauersberger 48'; Berzel (yellow card); Köppel (yellow card)	Report	Olwa-Luta (yellow card); Kain (yellow card); Sabbagh (yellow card)	Stadium: Grünwalder Stadion; Attendance: 12,500; Referee: Matthias Zacher

23 March 2018 29	1860 Munich	4–1	VfR Garching	Munich
19:00 CEST (UTC+2)	Mauersberger 13'; Ziereis 36'; Wein (yellow card) 38'; Kindsvater 42'; Bonmann (yellow card) 46'; Berzel (yellow card) 64'; Mölders (yellow card) 69' (goal) 76'	Report	Tugbay (yellow card) 28'; Eisgruber 61'; Pflügler (yellow card) 63'	Stadium: Grünwalder Stadion; Attendance: 12,500; Referee: Michael Bacher

28 March 2018 30	Greuther Fürth II	0–2	1860 Munich	Fürth
19:00 CET (UTC+1)	Langer (yellow card); Schad (yellow card)	Report	Ziereis 64'; Karger 71'; Seferings (yellow card)	Stadium: Sportpark Ronhof Thomas Sommer; Attendance: 2,525; Referee: Luka Beretic

7 April 2018 32	FC Schweinfurt 05	1–3	1860 Munich	Schweinfurt
14:05 CEST (UTC+2)	Fritscher (yellow card) 18'; Janz (yellow card) 26'; Krautschneider 30'	Report	Mölders 26' (pen.), 32', 53'	Stadium: Sachs-Stadion; Attendance: 6,872; Referee: Tobias Schultes

14 April 2018 33	1860 Munich	5–0	VfB Eichstätt	Munich
12:30 CEST (UTC+2)	Mölders 2', 29', 32'; Weber (yellow card) 45'; Wein 57'; Ziereis 61'; Hiller (red card) 78'	Report	Schäll (yellow card) 10'; Federl (yellow card) 34'; Wolfsteiner (yellow card) 56'; Kühnlein (yellow card) 63'; Schraufstetter (yellow card) 84'	Stadium: Grünwalder Stadion; Attendance: 12,500; Referee: Florian Riepl

17 April 2018 28	Ingolstadt 04 II	1–4	1860 Munich	Ingolstadt
19:00 CEST (UTC+2)	Hasenhüttl 9'	Report	Steinhart (yellow card) 27'; Karger 45'; Seferings 48'; Weber 75'; Koussou (yellow card) 90' (goal) 90+3'; Wein (yellow card) 90+1'	Stadium: ESV-Stadion; Attendance: 3,919; Referee: Christopher Schwarzmann

21 April 2018 35	1860 Munich	1–1	Augsburg II	Munich
14:05 CEST (UTC+2)	Mölders 62'; Köppel (yellow card)	Report	Greppmeir 85'; Ramser (yellow card)	Stadium: Grünwalder Stadion; Attendance: 12,500; Referee: Jonas Schieder

24 April 2018 26	FV Illertissen	0–2	1860 Munich	Illertissen
19:00 CEST (UTC+2)	Hahn (yellow card) 38'	Report	Berzel (yellow card) 63'; Kindsvater 68' (yellow card) 68'; Karger 74'	Stadium: Voehlin-Stadium; Attendance: 4,800; Referee: Stefan Treiber

29 April 2018 36	Bayern Munich II	3–1	1860 Munich	Munich
15:30 CEST (UTC+2)	Wriedt 19'; Obermair 44'; Pantović (yellow card) 63'; Türkkalesi (yellow card) 75'; Köhn 88'; Dorsch (yellow card) 90+3'	Report	Mölders (yellow card) 60'; Wein 65'; Berzel (yellow card) 70'; Mauersberger (yellow card) 82'	Stadium: Grünwalder Stadion; Attendance: 12,500; Referee: Steffen Brütting

5 May 2018 34	Pipinsried	0–3	1860 Munich	Pipinsried
17:00 CEST (UTC+2)	Grahammer (yellow card); Müller (yellow card); Reichlmayr (yellow card)	Report	Wein 23'; Karger 45+1'; Mölders 88' (yellow card); Görlitz (yellow card); Köppel (yellow card); Gebhart (yellow card)	Stadium: Stadion an der Reichertshausener Straße; Attendance: 7,000; Referee: Johannes Huber

12 May 2018 38	SpVgg Bayreuth	1–4	1860 Munich	Bayreuth
14:05 CEST (UTC+2)	Kolbeck 21'; Böhnlein (yellow card) 41'	Report	Bachschmid (yellow card) 39'; Ziereis 65'; Dressel 80'; Awata 81' (yellow card) 82'; Kindsvater 87'	Stadium: Hans-Walter-Wild-Stadion; Attendance: 3,069; Referee: Thomas Berg

==== Promotion play-off ====
24 May 2018 1st leg	FC Saarbrücken	2–3	1860 Munich	Völklingen
17:30 CEST (UTC+2)	Jänicke 44'; Schmidt 75'; Holz (yellow card); Zeitz (yellow card); Behrens (red card)	Report	Mölders 1', 84'; Karger 47'; Weber (yellow card); Wein (yellow card)	Stadium: Hermann-Neuberger-Stadion; Attendance: 6,800; Referee: Guido Winkmann

27 May 2018 2nd leg	1860 Munich	2–2 (5–4 agg.)	FC Saarbrücken	Munich
14:00 CEST (UTC+2)	Mauersberger (yellow card) 57'; Mölders 66' (pen.); Seferings 83' (yellow card) 86'	Report	Mauersberger 33' (o.g.); Kehl-Gómez (yellow card) 52'; Jacob 58'; Zellner (yellow card) 87'	Stadium: Grünwalder Stadion; Attendance: 12,500; Referee: Markus Schmidt

=== DFB-Pokal ===
13 August 2017 First round	1860 Munich	1–2	FC Ingolstadt	Munich
15:30 CEST (UTC+2)	Weber (yellow card) 17' (goal) 66'; Andermatt (yellow card) 32'; Wein (yellow card) 57'; Jakob (yellow card) 57'; Mauersberger (yellow card) 72' (yellow-red card) 90+7'; Berzel (yellow card) 82'	Report	Lezcano 20'; Kittel (yellow card) 40'; Wahl (yellow card) 60'; Lex (yellow card) 65'; Lezcano (yellow card) 80'; Kutschke 83' (pen.)	Stadium: Grünwalder Stadion; Attendance: 12,500; Referee: Tobias Stieler

=== Bavarian Cup ===
9 August 2017 First Round	VfR Neuburg	0–4	1860 Munich	Neuburg an der Donau
18:30 CEST (UTC+2)	Habermeyer (yellow card)	Report	Bachschmid 6', 33', 88'; Berzel 55'	Stadium: Sparkassen-Arena; Attendance: 3,200; Referee: Luka Beretic

22 August 2017 Second Round	TSV Dorfen	0–7	1860 Munich	Dorfen
18:00 CEST (UTC+2)	Hönninger (yellow card)	Report	Mölders 26', 52'; Karger 55'; Ziereis 70', 71'; Andermatt 77' (pen.); Bachschmid 86'; Weeger (yellow card)	Stadium: Dorfen Sports Complex; Attendance: 2,500; Referee: Thomas Berg

5 September 2017 Third Round	1860 Munich	4–0	Unterföhring	Munich
19:00 CEST (UTC+2)	Karger 2', 14', 23', 55'	Report	Kain (yellow card); Putta (yellow card); Söltl (yellow card)	Stadium: Grünwalder Stadion; Attendance: 6,900; Referee: Michael Bacher

2 April 2018 Quarter-Final	SpVgg Bayreuth	2–1	1860 Munich	Bayreuth
16:00 CEST (UTC+2)	Hobsch 60' (pen.), 88'; Knežević (yellow card)	Report	Genkinger 57'	Stadium: Hans-Walter-Wild-Stadion; Attendance: 7,123; Referee: Florian Badstübner

== Squad statistics ==
As of match played 27 May 2018

=== Appearances and goals ===
Players with no appearances are not included on the list
Italics indicate a loaned in player

No.	Pos	Nat	Player	Total		Regionalliga Bayern		Promotion play-off		DFB-Pokal		Bavarian Cup	
No.	Pos	Nat	Player	Apps	Goals	Apps	Goals	Apps	Goals	Apps	Goals	Apps	Goals
1	GK	(Germany) GER	Marco Hiller	35	0	33	0	2	0	0	0	0	0
2	DF	(Germany) GER	Eric Weeger	34	1	20+9	1	2	0	0	0	3	0
4	DF	(Germany) GER	Felix Weber	31	3	27	3	2	0	1	0	1	0
5	MF	(Switzerland) SUI	Nicolas Andermatt	24	2	12+7	1	0	0	1	0	3+1	1
6	DF	(Germany) GER	Jan Mauersberger	36	5	31	5	2	0	1	0	2	0
7	FW	(Syria) SYR	Mohamad Awata	2	1	0+2	1	0	0	0	0	0	0
8	MF	(Germany) GER	Simon Seferings	13	3	7+4	2	0+1	1	0	0	1	0
9	FW	(Germany) GER	Sascha Mölders	37	24	33	19	2	3	1	0	1	2
10	MF	(Germany) GER	Timo Gebhart	12	5	9+2	5	0	0	1	0	0	0
11	DF	(Germany) GER	Christian Köppel	37	4	19+12	4	1+1	0	1	0	2+1	0
14	MF	(Germany) GER	Dennis Dressel	1	1	1	1	0	0	0	0	0	0
16	MF	(Germany) GER	Benjamin Kindsvater	33	4	16+13	4	0+2	0	0	0	0+2	0
17	DF	(Germany) GER	Daniel Wein	37	4	32	4	2	0	1	0	2	0
18	FW	(Germany) GER	Nico Karger	38	20	31+1	14	2	1	1	0	2+1	5
19	DF	(Germany) GER	Lukas Aigner	4	0	1+1	0	0	0	0	0	2	0
20	FW	(Germany) GER	Tobias Steer	2	0	0+1	0	0	0	0	0	1	0
21	MF	(Turkey) TUR	Ugur Mustafa Türk	16	0	4+9	0	0	0	0	0	3	0
22	DF	(Germany) GER	Aaron Berzel	34	1	21+6	0	1+1	0	0+1	0	4	1
23	FW	(Germany) GER	Nicholas Helmbrecht	22	2	15+4	2	0	0	1	0	2	0
24	FW	(Germany) GER	Markus Ziereis	33	16	22+5	14	2	0	0+1	0	2+1	2
25	MF	(Germany) GER	Lucas Genkinger	3	0	1+1	0	0	0	0	0	1	0
27	MF	(Germany) GER	Michael Görlitz	8	0	2+4	0	0+1	0	0	0	1	0
31	MF	(Togo) TOG	Kodjovi Koussou	26	1	14+8	1	2	0	0	0	0+2	0
33	FW	(Germany) GER	Felix Bachschmid	18	4	3+12	0	0	0	0	0	2+1	4
36	DF	(Germany) GER	Phillipp Steinhart	33	1	29	1	2	0	0	0	2	0
37	GK	(Austria) AUT	Alexander Strobl	4	0	0	0	0	0	1	0	3	0
39	GK	(Germany) GER	Hendrik Bonmann	4	0	3	0	0	0	0	0	1	0
44	DF	(Russia) RUS	Leon Klassen	1	0	1	0	0	0	0	0	0	0
Players away on loan:
15	MF	(Slovakia) SVK	Martin Gamboš	1	0	0	0	0	0	0	0	0+1	0
29	MF	(Hungary) HUN	György Hursán	6	0	3+2	0	0	0	0	0	0+1	0
Players who featured but departed the club permanently during the season:
26	DF	(Germany) GER	Kilian Jakob	10	2	5+2	2	0	0	1	0	1+1	0
28	MF	(Germany) GER	Lino Tempelmann	8	0	3+3	0	0	0	0	0	2	0

=== Goal scorers ===
Place	Position	Nation	Number	Name	Regionalliga Bayern	Promotion play-off	DFB-Pokal	Bavarian Cup	Total
1	FW	(Germany)	9	Sascha Mölders	19	3	0	2	24
2	FW	(Germany)	18	Nico Karger	14	1	0	5	20
3	FW	(Germany)	24	Markus Ziereis	14	0	0	2	16
4	MF	(Germany)	10	Timo Gebhart	5	0	0	0	5
4	DF	(Germany)	6	Jan Mauersberger	5	0	0	0	5
6	DF	(Germany)	11	Christian Köppel	4	0	0	0	4
6	DF	(Germany)	17	Daniel Wein	4	0	0	0	4
6	MF	(Germany)	16	Benjamin Kindsvater	4	0	0	0	4
6	DF	(Germany)	4	Felix Weber	3	0	1	0	4
6	FW	(Germany)	33	Felix Bachschmid	0	0	0	4	4
11	MF	(Germany)	8	Simon Seferings	2	1	0	0	3
11				Own goal	3	0	0	0	3
13	DF	(Germany)	26	Kilian Jakob	2	0	0	0	2
13	MF	(Switzerland)	5	Nicolas Andermatt	1	0	0	1	2
15	FW	(Germany)	23	Nicholas Helmbrecht	1	0	0	0	1
15	DF	(Germany)	2	Eric Weeger	1	0	0	0	1
15	FW	(Germany)	23	Nicholas Helmbrecht	1	0	0	0	1
15	DF	(Germany)	36	Phillipp Steinhart	1	0	0	0	1
15	MF	(Togo)	31	Kodjovi Koussou	1	0	0	0	1
15	MF	(Germany)	14	Dennis Dressel	1	0	0	0	1
15	FW	(Syria)	7	Mohamad Awata	1	0	0	0	1
15	DF	(Germany)	22	Aaron Berzel	0	0	0	1	1
15	MF	(Germany)	25	Lucas Genkinger	0	0	0	1	1
Total					87	5	1	16	109

=== Clean sheets ===
Place	Position	Nation	Number	Name	Regionalliga Bayern	Promotion play-off	DFB-Pokal	Bavarian Cup	Total
1	GK	(Germany)	1	Marco Hiller	17	0	0	0	17
2	GK	(Austria)	37	Alexander Strobl	0	0	0	3	3
Total					17	0	0	3	20

=== Disciplinary record ===
Number	Nation	Position	Name	Regionalliga Bayern		Promotion play-off		DFB-Pokal		Bavarian Cup		Total	
Number	Nation	Position	Name	Booked	Sent off (straight red)	Booked	Sent off (straight red)	Booked	Sent off (straight red)	Booked	Sent off (straight red)	Booked	Sent off (straight red)
1	(Germany)	GK	Marco Hiller	0	1	0	0	0	0	0	0	0	1
2	(Germany)	DF	Eric Weeger	2	0	0	0	0	0	1	0	3	0
4	(Germany)	DF	Felix Weber	6	1	1	0	1	0	0	0	8	1
5	(Switzerland)	MF	Nicolas Andermatt	4	0	0	0	1	0	0	0	5	0
6	(Germany)	DF	Jan Mauersberger	2	0	1	0	2	1	0	0	5	1
7	(Syria)	FW	Mohamad Awata	1	0	0	0	0	0	0	0	1	0
8	(Germany)	MF	Simon Seferings	2	0	1	0	0	0	0	0	3	0
9	(Germany)	FW	Sascha Mölders	12	0	0	0	0	0	0	0	12	0
10	(Germany)	MF	Timo Gebhart	1	0	0	0	0	0	0	0	1	0
11	(Germany)	DF	Christian Köppel	5	0	0	0	0	0	0	0	5	0
16	(Germany)	MF	Benjamin Kindsvater	1	0	0	0	0	0	0	0	1	0
17	(Germany)	DF	Daniel Wein	8	0	1	0	1	0	0	0	10	0
18	(Germany)	FW	Nico Karger	3	0	0	0	0	0	0	0	3	0
22	(Germany)	DF	Aaron Berzel	14	0	0	0	1	0	0	0	15	0
23	(Germany)	FW	Nicholas Helmbrecht	3	2	0	0	0	0	0	0	3	2
24	(Germany)	FW	Markus Ziereis	1	0	0	0	0	0	0	0	1	0
27	(Germany)	MF	Michael Görlitz	1	0	0	0	0	0	0	0	1	0
31	(Togo)	MF	Kodjovi Koussou	1	0	0	0	0	0	0	0	1	0
33	(Germany)	FW	Felix Bachschmid	1	0	0	0	0	0	0	0	1	0
36	(Germany)	DF	Phillipp Steinhart	4	0	0	0	0	0	0	0	4	0
39	(Germany)	GK	Hendrik Bonmann	1	0	0	0	0	0	0	0	1	0
Players away on loan:
Players who left 1860 Munich during the season:
26	(Germany)	DF	Kilian Jakob	2	0	0	0	1	0	0	0	3	0
Total				75	4	4	0	7	1	1	0	87	5
