= 2019–20 TSV 1860 Munich season =

1860 Munich
2019–20 season
- Chairman: Hasan Ismaik
- Head Coach: Daniel Bierofka; Oliver Beer; Michael Köllner
- Stadium: Allianz Arena
- 3. Liga: 8th
- Bavarian Cup: ---
- Top goalscorer: League: Sascha Mölders (15); All: Sascha Mölders (15)
Home colours	Away colours

The 2019–20 TSV 1860 Munich season was the club's 2nd season in the 3. Liga following their promotion from the Regionalliga Bayern at the end of the 2017–18 season.

== Season events ==
On 25 June, 1860 announced the signing of Dennis Erdmann from FC Magdeburg.

On 10 July, 1860 announced that they had signed a new contract with Aaron Berzel after his previous contract expired at the end of the previous season.

On 31 August, 1860 announced that Prince Owusu had returned to the club, signing on loan from Arminia Bielefeld for the season.

On 2 September, 1860 announced the signing of Tim Rieder on loan from Augsburg for the season.

=== Effects of the COVID-19 pandemic ===
Due to the COVID-19 pandemic in Germany, the matchdays 28 and 29 were postponed and will be rescheduled. On 16 March, the DFB announced that the league would be suspended until 30 April. On 27 April, the league was suspended further but with intention to return. A decision on the resumption of the competition, similar to the Bundesliga and 2. Bundesliga, took place at an extraordinary meeting of the DFB-Bundestag on 25 May 2020. On 15 May, after the DFB said earlier that 26 May would be the start date to resume, the date was moved back as not all teams can train again regularly. The intention still was to finish the season, with games maybe even after 30 June. On 21 May, the DFB announced that the season will be continued on 30 May. That was confirmed on 25 May. On 29 May, after a meeting of all clubs, five substitutions will be permitted, which has been temporarily allowed by IFAB following a proposal by FIFA to lessen the impact of fixture congestion.

== Squad ==
As of match played 4 July 2020

No.	Name	Nationality	Position	Date of birth (age)	Signed from	Signed in	Contract ends	Apps.	Goals
Goalkeepers
1	Marco Hiller	(Germany)	GK	20 February 1997 (aged 23)	Academy	2015		102	0
38	Hendrik Bonmann	(Germany)	GK	22 January 1994 (aged 26)	Borussia Dortmund	2017	2020	23	0
40	Tom Kretzschmar	(Germany)	GK	19 January 1999 (aged 21)	Academy	2018		0	0
Defenders
2	Eric Weeger	(Germany)	DF	2 February 1997 (aged 23)	Academy	2017		48	3
3	Niklas Lang	(Germany)	DF	13 June 2002 (aged 18)	Academy	2019		0	0
4	Felix Weber	(Germany)	DF	18 January 1995 (aged 25)	Academy	2016		94	7
13	Dennis Erdmann	(Germany)	DF	22 November 1990 (aged 29)	FC Magdeburg	2019		33	0
17	Daniel Wein	(Germany)	DF	5 February 1994 (aged 26)	Wehen Wiesbaden	2017		113	7
22	Aaron Berzel	(Germany)	DF	29 May 1992 (aged 28)	SV Elversberg	2017		79	3
23	Tim Rieder	(Germany)	DF	3 September 1993 (aged 26)	on loan from Augsburg	2019	2020	26	3
27	Semi Belkahia	(Germany)	DF	22 December 1998 (aged 21)	VfR Garching	2018		6	0
28	Herbert Paul	(Germany)	DF	11 February 1994 (aged 26)	FC Schweinfurt 05	2018		62	5
33	Leon Klassen	(Russia)	DF	29 May 2000 (aged 20)	Academy	2016		25	2
36	Phillipp Steinhart	(Germany)	DF	7 July 1992 (aged 27)	Sportfreunde Lotte	2017	2019	104	7
Midfielders
5	Quirin Moll	(Germany)	MF	21 January 1991 (aged 29)	Eintracht Braunschweig	2018		30	1
8	Simon Seferings	(Germany)	MF	5 July 1995 (aged 24)	SV Heimstetten	2015		20	3
10	Timo Gebhart	(Germany)	MF	12 April 1989 (aged 31)	Viktoria 1889 Berlin	2019		85	13
14	Dennis Dressel	(Germany)	MF	26 October 1998 (aged 21)	Academy	2017		41	7
16	Benjamin Kindsvater	(Germany)	MF	8 February 1993 (aged 27)	Wacker Burghausen	2017		70	6
20	Efkan Bekiroğlu	(Germany)	MF	14 September 1995 (aged 24)	Augsburg II	2018		62	14
25	Marius Willsch	(Germany)	MF	18 March 1991 (aged 29)	FC Schweinfurt 05	2018		62	0
34	Kristian Böhnlein	(Germany)	MF	10 May 1990 (aged 30)	SpVgg Bayreuth	2018		20	1
Forwards
7	Stefan Lex	(Germany)	FW	27 November 1989 (aged 30)	Ingolstadt 04	2018		70	12
9	Sascha Mölders	(Germany)	FW	20 March 1985 (aged 35)	Augsburg	2016		150	54
11	Fabian Greilinger	(Germany)	FW	13 September 2000 (aged 19)	Academy	2019		14	0
18	Nico Karger	(Germany)	FW	1 February 1993 (aged 27)	Academy	2015		98	26
19	Noel Niemann	(Germany)	FW	14 November 1999 (aged 20)	Academy	2018		16	2
21	Prince Owusu	(Germany)	FW	7 January 1997 (aged 23)	on loan from Arminia Bielefeld	2019	2020	45	7
24	Markus Ziereis	(Germany)	FW	26 August 1992 (aged 27)	Jahn Regensburg	2017	2020	64	21
Out on loan
Left during the season
	Marco Raimondo-Metzger	(Germany)	DF	17 January 1992 (aged 28)	Wormatia Worms	2018		0	0

== Transfers ==
=== In ===
Date	Position	Nationality	Name	From	Fee	Ref.
25 June 2019	DF	(Germany)	Dennis Erdmann	FC Magdeburg	Undisclosed	

=== Loans in ===
Start date	Position	Nationality	Name	From	End date	Ref.
31 August 2019	FW	(Germany)	Prince Owusu	Arminia Bielefeld	Undisclosed	
2 September 2019	DF	(Germany)	Tim Rieder	Augsburg	Undisclosed	

== Friendlies ==
	v
CET (UTC+1)

	v
CET (UTC+1)

	v
CET (UTC+1)

	v
CET (UTC+1)

	v
CET (UTC+1)

	v
CET (UTC+1)

	v
CET (UTC+1)

	v
CET (UTC+1)

	v
CET (UTC+1)

	v
CET (UTC+1)

== Competitions ==
=== Overall record ===
Competition	First match	Last match	Starting round	Final position	Record							
Competition	First match	Last match	Starting round	Final position	Pld	W	D	L	GF	GA	GD	Win %
3. Liga	19 July 2019	4 July 2020	Matchday 1	8th	38	16	10	12	63	54	+9	42.11
Bavarian Cup	8 August 2019	2020–21 season	First Round	Quarter-final	4	2	2	0	18	3	+15	50.00
Total					42	18	12	12	81	57	+24	42.86

Last updated: 4 July 2020
Source: Competitions

=== 3. Liga ===
==== League table ====
Pos	Team	Pld	W	D	L	GF	GA	GD	Pts
6	Hansa Rostock	38	17	8	13	54	43	+11	59
7	SV Meppen	38	16	10	12	69	57	+12	58
8	1860 Munich	38	16	10	12	63	54	+9	58
9	Waldhof Mannheim	38	13	17	8	52	47	+5	56
10	1. FC Kaiserslautern	38	14	13	11	59	54	+5	55

Source: DFB
Rules for classification: 1) Points; 2) Goal difference; 3) Goals scored; 4) Head-to-head results; 5) Head-to-head away goals scored; 6) Away goals scored; 7) Play-off.

==== Results by round ====
Round	1	2	3	4	5	6	7	8	9	10	11	12	13	14	15	16	17	18	19	20	21	22	23	24	25	26	27	28	29	30	31	32	33	34	35	36	37	38
Ground	H	A	H	A	H	A	A	H	A	H	A	H	A	H	A	H	A	H	A	A	H	A	H	A	H	H	A	H	A	H	A	H	A	H	A	H	A	H
Result	D	L	W	L	D	L	W	W	L	W	L	L	L	W	W	D	W	D	D	W	W	D	D	D	D	W	W	W	D	L	W	L	L	W	L	W	W	L
Position	9	16	7	15	15	18	14	11	14	12	14	15	15	15	12	14	10	10	11	10	7	6	7	9	9	8	6	3	6	8	7	8	9	8	9	7	7	8
Points	1	1	4	4	5	5	8	11	11	14	14	14	14	17	20	21	24	25	26	29	32	33	34	35	36	39	42	45	46	46	49	49	49	52	52	55	58	58

Updated to match(es) played on 4 July 2020. Source:
A = Away; H = Home; W = Win; D = Draw; L = Loss

==== Results ====
19 July 2019 1	1860 Munich	1–1	Preußen Münster	Munich
19:00 CEST (UTC+2)	Erdmann (yellow card) 3'; Kindsvater (yellow card) 40'; Steinhart 51' (pen.); Greilinger (yellow card) 84'; Dressel (yellow card) 88'	Report	Brandenburger (yellow card) 16'; Schauerte 32'; Heidemann (yellow card) 45'	Stadium: Grünwalder Stadion; Attendance: 15,000; Referee: Harm Osmers

27 July 2019 2	Eintracht Braunschweig	2–1	1860 Munich	Braunschweig
14:00 CEST (UTC+2)	Nehrig (yellow card) 15'; Kobylański 43' (yellow card) 64'; Becker (yellow card) 48'; Schwenk (yellow card) 50'; Kessel 62'	Report	Mölders 5' (yellow card) 61'; Erdmann (yellow card) 15'; Dressel (yellow card) 25'; Weber (yellow card) 33' (yellow-red card) 51'; Steinhart (yellow card) 59'; Bekiroğlu (yellow card) 80'	Stadium: Eintracht-Stadion; Attendance: 19,233; Referee: Martin Thomsen

31 July 2019 3	1860 Munich	3–0	FSV Zwickau	Munich
19:00 CEST (UTC+2)	Bekiroğlu 33', 60'; Paul (yellow card) 88' (goal) 89'	Report	Hauptmann (yellow card) 17'; Jensen (yellow card) 71'	Stadium: Grünwalder Stadion; Attendance: 15,000; Referee: Pascal Müller

5 August 2019 4	Waldhof Mannheim	4–0	1860 Munich	Mannheim
19:00 CEST (UTC+2)	Schultz 32' (yellow card) 81'; Korte 49', 53'; Christiansen (yellow card) 77'; Diring 89'	Report	Willsch (yellow card) 31'; Erdmann (yellow card) 63'; Weber (yellow card) 79'	Stadium: Carl-Benz-Stadion; Attendance: 14,221; Referee: Christof Günsch

17 August 2019 5	1860 Munich	0–0	SV Meppen	Munich
14:00 CEST (UTC+2)	Steinhart (yellow card) 85'	Report	Evseev (yellow card) 28'; Osée (yellow card) 45'; Kremer (yellow card) 63'	Stadium: Grünwalder Stadion; Attendance: 14,500; Referee: Benedikt Kempkes

24 August 2019 6	FC Magdeburg	5–1	1860 Munich	Magdeburg
14:00 CEST (UTC+2)	Berzel 14' (o.g.); Beck 28', 41'; Preißinger (yellow card) 37'; Bertram 39'; Jacobsen (yellow card) 61'; Perthel (yellow card) 70'; Rother 74'	Report	Berzel (yellow card) 37'; Ziereis 90'	Stadium: Avnet Arena; Attendance: 16,606; Referee: Tobias Reichel

30 August 2019 7	Chemnitzer	0–1	1860 Muich	Chemnitz
18:00 CEST (UTC+2)	Bohl (yellow card) 22'	Report	Berzel (yellow card) 13'; Steinhart (yellow card) 17'; Willsch (yellow card) 67'; Klassen 77' (yellow card) 90'	Stadium: Stadion an der Gellertstraße; Attendance: 4,566; Referee: Franz Bokop

14 September 2019 8	1860 Munich	3–1	Carl Zeiss Jena	Munich
14:00 CEST (UTC+2)	Weber 17', 35'; Bekiroğlu 79'	Report	Rohr 68'	Stadium: Grünwalder Stadion; Attendance: 15,000; Referee: Lukas Benen

21 September 2019 9	MSV Duisburg	2–1	1860 Munich	Duisburg
14:00 CEST (UTC+2)	Vermeij 15'; Daschner 52'	Report	Owusu 1'; Steinhart (yellow card) 25' (yellow-red card) 82'	Stadium: MSV-Arena; Attendance: 15,505; Referee: Eric Müller

28 September 2019 10	1860 Munich	3–1	FC Kaiserslautern	Munich
14:00 CEST (UTC+2)	Schad 7' (o.g.); Berzel (yellow card) 14'; Matuwila 48' (o.g.); Gebhart 52'	Report	Hemlein (yellow card) 15'; Kraus (yellow card) 39'; Sickinger 51'; Sternberg (yellow card) 66'; Zuck (yellow card) 74'	Stadium: Grünwalder Stadion; Attendance: 15,000; Referee: Robert Schröder

7 October 2019 11	Würzburger Kickers	2–1	1860 Munich	Würzburg
19:00 CEST (UTC+2)	Schuppan (yellow card) 22'; Gnaase 24' (yellow card) 28'; Kaufmann 62'; Pfeiffer (yellow card) 80' (yellow-red card) 80'	Report	Mölders 47'; Willsch (yellow card) 60'; Berzel (yellow card) 74'; Rieder (yellow card) 80'; Weber (yellow card) 90'	Stadium: Akon Arena; Attendance: 8,346; Referee: Robert Kampka

19 October 2019 12	1860 Munich	0–1	Uerdingen 05	Munich
14:00 CEST (UTC+2)	Weber (yellow card) 29' (yellow-red card) 51'; Erdmann (yellow card) 40'; Bonmann (yellow card) 51'	Report	Mbom (yellow card) 40'; Lukimya-Mulongoti (yellow card) 69'; Evina (yellow card) 70'; Matuszczyk (yellow card) 74' (goal) 82'	Stadium: Grünwalder Stadion; Attendance: 15,000; Referee: Tobias Fritsch

26 October 2019 13	Hansa Rostock	2–1	1860 Munich	Rostock
14:00 CEST (UTC+2)	Sonnenberg (yellow card) 20'; Bülow (yellow card) 37'; Ahlschwede 43'; Omladič 50'; Nartey (yellow card) 56'; Pepić (yellow card) 82'	Report	Mölders 59'; Erdmann (yellow card) 77'; Wein (yellow card) 89'	Stadium: Ostseestadion; Attendance: 17,727; Referee: Mitja Stegemann

2 November 2019 14	1860 Munich	4–2	Viktoria Köln	Munich
14:00 CET (UTC+1)	Mölders 5', 80'; Lex 31'; Berzel 83'	Report	Gottschling (yellow card) 64'; Handle 70'; Bunjaku 86'	Stadium: Grünwalder Stadion; Attendance: 15,000; Referee: Frank Willenborg

9 November 2019 15	Hallescher	0–1	1860 Munich	Halle
19:00 CET (UTC+1)		Report	Lex 39'; Steinhart (yellow card) 85'	Stadium: Leuna-Chemie-Stadion; Attendance: 8,624; Referee: Sven Jablonski

24 November 2019 16	1860 Munich	1–1	Bayern Munich II	Munich
14:00 CET (UTC+1)	Wein (yellow card) 36'; Mölders (yellow card) 40'; Dressel 68'	Report	Wriedt 27'; Feldhahn (yellow card) 30'; Kern (yellow card) 59'	Stadium: Grünwalder Stadion; Attendance: 15,000; Referee: Bibiana Steinhaus

1 December 2019 17	SpVgg Unterhaching	2–3	1860 Munich	Unterhaching
14:00 CET (UTC+1)	Stroh-Engel 18'; Heinrich (yellow card) 39' (goal) 79'; Greger (yellow card) 58'; Winkler (yellow card) 77'	Report	Wein (yellow card) 15'; Mölders 24', 90+1'; Rieder 52'; Berzel (yellow card) 76'	Stadium: Sportpark Unterhaching; Attendance: 15,000; Referee: Patrick Ittrich

7 December 2019 18	1860 Munich	1–1	Sonnenhof Großaspach	Munich
14:00 CET (UTC+1)	Rieder 11'; Wein (yellow card) 31'; Böhnlein (yellow card) 45'; Erdmann (yellow card) 78'	Report	Jüllich (yellow card) 30'; Behounek (yellow card) 39' (yellow-red card) 45+3'; Vlachodimos 52'; Gipson (yellow card) 83'; Reule (yellow card) 87'	Stadium: Grünwalder Stadion; Attendance: 14,500; Referee: Max Burda

16 December 2019 19	Ingolstadt 04	2–2	1860 Munich	Ingolstadt
19:00 CET (UTC+1)	Gaus 10', 64' (yellow card) 88'; Beister (red card) 58'	Report	Owusu 16'; Mölders 19'; Wein (yellow card) 53'	Stadium: Audi Sportpark; Attendance: 14,697; Referee: Tobias Reichel

21 December 2019 20	Preußen Münster	0–1	1860 Munich	Münster
14:00 CET (UTC+1)	Özcan (yellow card) 31'; Kittner (yellow card) 41' (yellow-red card) 72'; Litka (yellow card) 86'	Report	Berzel (yellow card) 31'; Niemann (yellow card) 57'; Mölders 65'; Willsch (yellow card) 69'; Erdmann (yellow card) 86'	Stadium: Preußenstadion; Attendance: 8,154; Referee: Florian Lechner

26 January 2020 21	1860 Munich	4–1	Eintracht Braunschweig	Munich
13:00 CET (UTC+1)	Nkansah 7'; Dressel 22'; Mölders 67', 79'	Report	Bär 29'; Kijewski (yellow card) 60'; Nehrig (yellow card) 67'	Stadium: Grünwalder Stadion; Attendance: 15,000; Referee: Matthias Jöllenbeck

2 February 2020 22	FSV Zwickau	2–2	1860 Munich	Zwickau
14:00 CET (UTC+1)	Jensen (yellow card) 31'; Hehne 45'; Coşkun (yellow card) 45'; Frick 57'; Dörfler (yellow card) 61'; Godinho (yellow card) 90'	Report	Steinhart (yellow card) 28'; Mölders 37'; Lex 49'; Owusu (yellow card) 59'; Erdmann (yellow card) 78'; Bekiroğlu (yellow card) 81'; Weber (yellow card) 87'; Bonmann (yellow card) 87'	Stadium: Stadion Zwickau; Attendance: 6,685; Referee: Patrick Kessel

8 February 2020 23	1860 Munich	1–1	Waldhof Mannheim	Munich
14:00 CET (UTC+1)	Niemann 54'; Klassen (yellow card) 82'	Report	Schuster (yellow card) 60'; Bouziane 62'	Stadium: Grünwalder Stadion; Attendance: 15,000; Referee: Guido Winkmann

15 February 2020 24	SV Meppen	1–1	1860 Munich	Meppen
14:00 CET (UTC+1)	Undav 4' (yellow card) 59'; Osée (yellow card) 34'; Leugers (yellow card) 43'	Report	Lex (yellow card) 16'; Niemann 50'; Steinhart (yellow card) 56'; Rieder (yellow card) 70'; Willsch (yellow card) 84'	Stadium: Hänsch-Arena; Attendance: 8,200; Referee: Robin Braun

23 February 2020 25	1860 Munich	1–1	FC Magdeburg	Munich
13:00 CET (UTC+1)	Berzel 32'; Rieder (yellow card) 41'; Bekiroğlu (yellow card) 54'; Hiller (yellow card) 60'; Erdmann (yellow card) 67'; Mölders (yellow card) 88'	Report	Jacobsen (yellow card) 28'; Wollitz (yellow card) 29'; Costly (yellow card) 31'; Rother (yellow card) 37'; Conteh (yellow card) 53'; Gjasula 60' (pen.) (yellow card) 62'; Koglin (yellow card) 78'; Müller (yellow card) 88'	Stadium: Grünwalder Stadion; Attendance: 15,000; Referee: Tobias Fritsch

29 February 2020 26	1860 Munich	4–3	Chemnitzer	Munich
14:00 CET (UTC+1)	Erdmann (yellow card) 18'; Rieder (yellow card) 36'; Lex 41'; Berzel (yellow card) 51'; Gebhart 56' (pen.); Mölders 58'; Willsch (yellow card) 74'; Owusu 90+2' (yellow card) 90+2'	Report	Hoheneder 2' (yellow card) 83'; Itter (yellow card) 34'; Tallig 36'; Jakubov (yellow card) 49'; Hosiner 65'; Sirigu (yellow card) 67'; Bonga (yellow card) 69'; Campulka (yellow card) 89'; Reddemann (yellow card) 90+1'	Stadium: Grünwalder Stadion; Attendance: 15,000; Referee: Marcel Gasteier

7 March 2020 27	Carl Zeiss Jena	0–3	1860 Munich	Jena
14:00 CET (UTC+1)	Gabriele (yellow card) 61'; Sulu (yellow card) 74'; Günther-Schmidt (yellow card) 84'	Report	Gebhart 7'; Bekiroğlu 23'; Lex 55'; Wein (yellow card) 85'	Stadium: Ernst-Abbe-Sportfeld; Attendance: 5,369; Referee: Florian Exner

31 May 2020 28	1860 Munich	3–2	MSV Duisburg	Munich
13:00 CEST (UTC+2)	Bekiroğlu (yellow card) 42' (goal) 73'; Erdmann (yellow card) 49'; Dressel 68'; Owusu 86'	Report	Krempicki (yellow card) 20'; Compper 33'; Vermeij 49'	Stadium: Grünwalder Stadion; Attendance: 0 Referee: Florian Badstübner
Note: Match played behind closed doors due to the COVID-19 pandemic.

3 June 2020 29	FC Kaiserslautern	1–1	1860 Munich	Kaiserslautern
20:30 CEST (UTC+2)	Röser 13'; Hercher (yellow card) 36'; Schad (yellow card) 51'	Report	Lex 31'; Erdmann (yellow card) 38'; Mölders (yellow card) 44'; Willsch (yellow card) 87'	Stadium: Fritz-Walter-Stadion; Attendance: 0 Referee: Benedikt Kempkes
Note: Match played behind closed doors due to the COVID-19 pandemic.

6 June 2020 30	1860 Munich	1–2	Würzburger Kickers	Munich
14:00 CEST (UTC+2)	Bekiroğlu 51'; Dressel (yellow card) 60'; Mölders (yellow card) 78'; Steinhart (yellow card) 85'; Niemann (yellow card) 90'	Report	Kaufmann 14', 62'	Stadium: Grünwalder Stadion; Attendance: 0 Referee: Robert Hartmann
Note: Match played behind closed doors due to the COVID-19 pandemic.

9 June 2020 31	Uerdingen 05	1–3	1860 Munich	Duisburg
19:00 CEST (UTC+2)	Grimaldi 36'; Mbom (yellow card) 49'; Ibrahimaj (yellow card) 63'; Vollath (yellow card) 69'; Barry (yellow card) 82'; Lukimya-Mulongoti (yellow card) 90+2'	Report	Böhnlein 57'; Klassen 66' (yellow card) 83'; Rieder (yellow card) 73'; Wein (yellow card) 80'; Bekiroğlu 90+3'	Stadium: MSV-Arena; Attendance: 0 Referee: Oliver Lossius
Note: Match played behind closed doors due to the COVID-19 pandemic.

13 June 2020 32	1860 Munich	0–1	Hansa Rostock	Munich
14:00 CEST (UTC+2)	Wein (yellow card) 38'	Report	Breier 60'; Sonnenberg (yellow card) 90'	Stadium: Grünwalder Stadion; Attendance: 0 Referee: Robert Kempter
Note: Match played behind closed doors due to the COVID-19 pandemic.

16 June 2020 33	Viktoria Köln	2–0	1860 Munich	Cologne
20:30 CEST (UTC+2)	Dej (yellow card) 42'; Bunjaku 56'; Gottschling (yellow card) 63'; Holzweiler 80'; Carls (yellow card) 90+2'	Report	Böhnlein (yellow card) 24'; Willsch (yellow card) 29'; Steinhart (yellow card) 47'; Lex (yellow card) 55'; Mölders (yellow card) 76'; Rieder (yellow card) 86'	Stadium: Sportpark Höhenberg; Attendance: 0 Referee: Marcel Gasteier
Note: Match played behind closed doors due to the COVID-19 pandemic.

21 June 2020 34	1860 Munich	2–1	Hallescher	Munich
14:00 CEST (UTC+2)	Lex 8'; Mölders 50'; Berzel (yellow card) 75'	Report	Syhre 33'; Papadopoulos (yellow card) 90+3'	Stadium: Grünwalder Stadion; Attendance: 0 Referee: Patrick Alt

24 June 2020 35	Bayern Munich II	2–1	1860 Munich	Munich
20:30 CEST (UTC+2)	Welzmüller (yellow card) 39'; Wriedt 45+1'; Tillman 79'	Report	Berzel (yellow card) 21'; Mölders 34'; Erdmann (yellow card) 90+2'	Stadium: Grünwalder Stadion; Attendance: 0 Referee: Christian Dingert
Note: Match played behind closed doors due to the COVID-19 pandemic.

27 June 2020 36	1860 Munich	3–0	SpVgg Unterhaching	Munich
14:00 CEST (UTC+2)	Berzel (yellow card) 6'; Dressel 39', 58', 73'; Mölders (yellow card) 79'	Report	Winkler (yellow card) 34' (yellow-red card) 47'; Krauß (yellow card) 45'	Stadium: Grünwalder Stadion; Attendance: 0 Referee: Florian Badstübner

1 July 2020 37	Sonnenhof Großaspach	2–4	1860 Munich	Aspach
19:00 CEST (UTC+2)	Brünker 17', 30'; Jüllich (yellow card) 21'; Martinović (yellow card) 61'	Report	Wein 10'; Rieder 38'; Bonmann (yellow card) 66'; Klassen (yellow card) 67'; Bekiroğlu 76', 80'	Stadium: WIRmachenDRUCK Arena; Attendance: 0 Referee: Jonas Weickenmeier
Note: Match played behind closed doors due to the COVID-19 pandemic.

4 July 2020 38	1860 Munich	0–2	Ingolstadt 04	Munich
14:00 CEST (UTC+2)	Erdmann (yellow card) 45'; Wein (yellow card) 65'; Berzel (yellow card) 65'; Steinhart (yellow card) 73'; Paul (red card) 80'; Rieder (yellow card) 82'; Klassen (yellow card) 86'	Report	Beister 50' (yellow card) 74'; Eckert 82'	Stadium: Grünwalder Stadion; Attendance: 0 Referee: Markus Schmidt

=== Bavarian Cup ===
8 August 2019 First Round	FT Schweinfurt	1–6	1860 Munich	Schweinfurt
18:30 CEST (UTC+2)	Herrmann 86'; Reuß (yellow card)	Report	Klassen 7'; Ziereis 18', 35', 72'; Greilinger 64'; Seferings 70'	Stadium: Maibacher Höhe Stadium; Attendance: 2,000; Referee: Markus Pflaum

20 August 2019 Second Round	TV Aiglsbach	1–11	1860 Munich	Aiglsbach
19:00 CEST (UTC+2)	Ziegler 66'; Ehrenreich (yellow card); Rasch (yellow card); Gröber (yellow card)	Report	Ziereis 7', 33', 75'; Lex 17', 90'; Willsch 48'; Greilinger 55'; Berzel 68' (yellow card); Seferings 73'; Gebhart 85', 88'; Erdmann (yellow card)	Stadium: Sportanlage Sommerau; Attendance: 2,800; Referee: Tobias Wittmann

3 September 2019 Last 16	TSV 1865 Dachau	0–0 (5–6 p)	1860 Munich	Dachau
17:30 CEST (UTC+2)		Report	Böhnlein (yellow card); Klassen (yellow card)	Stadium: Sportanlage Jahnstraße; Attendance: 2,487; Referee: Thomas Berg
	Penalties
	Weiss (penalty scored); Volland (penalty scored); Hockendorff (penalty scored); Grotz (penalty scored); Maric (penalty scored); Brey (penalty missed)		(penalty scored) Wein; (penalty scored) Ziereis; (penalty scored) Weber; (penalty scored) Gebhart; (penalty scored) Mölders; (penalty scored) Böhnlein

11 October 2019 Quarter-Final	1860 Munich	1–1 (3–2 p)	SpVgg Unterhaching	Munich
19:30 CEST (UTC+2)	Owusu 64'; Klassen (yellow card); Weber (yellow card)	Report	Dietz 41'; Stierlin (yellow card)	Stadium: Grünwalder Stadion; Attendance: 11,100; Referee: Robert Hartmann
	Penalties
	Gebhart (penalty scored); Wein (penalty missed); Steinhart (penalty scored); Weber (penalty scored)		(penalty scored) Greger; (penalty missed) Grauschopf; (penalty scored) Hufnagel; (penalty missed) Schröter; (penalty missed) Heinrich

1860's Semi-Final match took place during the 2020–21 season due to the COVID-19 pandemic.

== Squad statistics ==
As of match played 4 July 2020

=== Appearances and goals ===
Players with no appearances are not included on the list
Italics indicate a loaned in player

No.	Pos	Nat	Player	Total		3. Liga		Bavarian Cup	
No.	Pos	Nat	Player	Apps	Goals	Apps	Goals	Apps	Goals
1	GK	(Germany) GER	Marco Hiller	29	0	25	0	4	0
4	DF	(Germany) GER	Felix Weber	25	2	18+4	2	2+1	0
5	MF	(Germany) GER	Quirin Moll	8	0	2+6	0	0	0
7	FW	(Germany) GER	Stefan Lex	33	7	23+6	7	4	0
8	MF	(Germany) GER	Simon Seferings	5	0	1+1	0	3	0
9	FW	(Germany) GER	Sascha Mölders	39	15	36+1	15	0+2	0
10	MF	(Germany) GER	Timo Gebhart	31	3	12+15	3	1+3	0
11	FW	(Germany) GER	Fabian Greilinger	14	0	7+5	0	2	0
13	DF	(Germany) GER	Dennis Erdmann	33	0	29+2	0	2	0
14	MF	(Germany) GER	Dennis Dressel	35	6	25+8	6	1+1	0
16	MF	(Germany) GER	Benjamin Kindsvater	14	0	10+3	0	0+1	0
17	DF	(Germany) GER	Daniel Wein	38	1	34+1	1	3	0
18	FW	(Germany) GER	Nico Karger	8	0	1+7	0	0	0
19	FW	(Germany) GER	Noel Niemann	16	2	8+5	2	1+2	0
20	MF	(Germany) GER	Efkan Bekiroğlu	29	9	24+4	9	1	0
21	FW	(Germany) GER	Prince Owusu	29	4	11+17	4	1	0
22	DF	(Germany) GER	Aaron Berzel	30	2	24+4	2	2	0
23	DF	(Germany) GER	Tim Rieder	26	3	24+1	3	1	0
24	FW	(Germany) GER	Markus Ziereis	14	1	2+9	1	3	0
25	MF	(Germany) GER	Marius Willsch	40	0	29+7	0	2+2	0
28	DF	(Germany) GER	Herbert Paul	26	1	15+8	1	3	0
33	DF	(Russia) RUS	Leon Klassen	23	2	10+9	2	4	0
34	MF	(Germany) GER	Kristian Böhnlein	12	1	3+6	1	3	0
36	DF	(Germany) GER	Phillipp Steinhart	35	1	33+1	1	1	0
39	GK	(Germany) GER	Hendrik Bonmann	13	0	13	0	0	0
Players away on loan:
Players who featured but departed the club permanently during the season:

=== Goal scorers ===
Place	Position	Nation	Number	Name	3. Liga	Bavarian Cup	Total
1	FW	(Germany)	9	Sascha Mölders	15	0	15
2	MF	(Germany)	20	Efkan Bekiroğlu	9	0	9
3	FW	(Germany)	7	Stefan Lex	7	2	9
4	FW	(Germany)	24	Markus Ziereis	1	6	7
5	MF	(Germany)	14	Dennis Dressel	6	0	6
6	FW	(Germany)	21	Prince Owusu	4	1	5
6	MF	(Germany)	10	Timo Gebhart	3	2	5
8	DF	(Germany)	23	Tim Rieder	3	0	3
8	DF	(Germany)	22	Aaron Berzel	2	1	3
8	DF	(Russia)	33	Leon Klassen	2	1	3
8				Own goal	3	0	3
12	DF	(Germany)	4	Felix Weber	2	0	2
12	FW	(Germany)	19	Noel Niemann	2	0	2
12	FW	(Germany)	11	Fabian Greilinger	0	2	2
12	MF	(Germany)	8	Simon Seferings	0	2	2
16	DF	(Germany)	28	Herbert Paul	1	0	1
16	DF	(Germany)	36	Phillipp Steinhart	1	0	1
16	MF	(Germany)	34	Kristian Böhnlein	1	0	1
16	DF	(Germany)	17	Daniel Wein	1	0	1
16	MF	(Germany)	25	Marius Willsch	0	1	1
Total					63	18	81

=== Clean sheets ===
Place	Position	Nation	Number	Name	3. Liga	Bavarian Cup	Total
1	GK	(Germany)	1	Marco Hiller	4	1	5
2	GK	(Germany)	39	Hendrik Bonmann	3	0	3
Total					7	1	8

=== Disciplinary record ===
Number	Nation	Position	Name	3. Liga		Bavarian Cup		Total	
Number	Nation	Position	Name	Booked	Sent off (straight red)	Booked	Sent off (straight red)	Booked	Sent off (straight red)
1	(Germany)	GK	Marco Hiller	1	0	0	0	1	0
4	(Germany)	DF	Felix Weber	7	2	1	0	8	2
7	(Germany)	FW	Stefan Lex	2	0	0	0	2	0
9	(Germany)	FW	Sascha Mölders	7	0	0	0	7	0
11	(Germany)	FW	Fabian Greilinger	1	0	0	0	1	0
13	(Germany)	DF	Dennis Erdmann	14	0	1	0	15	0
14	(Germany)	MF	Dennis Dressel	4	0	0	0	4	0
16	(Germany)	MF	Benjamin Kindsvater	1	0	0	0	1	0
17	(Germany)	DF	Daniel Wein	9	0	0	0	9	0
19	(Germany)	FW	Noel Niemann	2	0	0	0	2	0
20	(Germany)	MF	Efkan Bekiroğlu	4	0	0	0	4	0
21	(Germany)	FW	Prince Owusu	2	0	0	0	2	0
22	(Germany)	DF	Aaron Berzel	11	0	1	0	12	0
23	(Germany)	DF	Tim Rieder	7	0	0	0	7	0
25	(Germany)	MF	Marius Willsch	8	0	0	0	8	0
28	(Germany)	DF	Herbert Paul	1	1	0	0	1	1
33	(Russia)	DF	Leon Klassen	5	0	2	0	7	0
34	(Germany)	MF	Kristian Böhnlein	2	0	1	0	3	0
36	(Germany)	DF	Phillipp Steinhart	11	1	0	0	11	1
39	(Germany)	GK	Hendrik Bonmann	3	0	0	0	3	0
Players away on loan:
Players who left 1860 Munich during the season:
Total				102	4	6	0	108	4
