= SpVgg Ansbach =

German football club

- Full name: Spielvereinigung Ansbach 1909 e.V.
- Founded: 1909
- Ground: Xaver-Bertsch-Sportpark
- Capacity: 5,000
- Manager: Niklas Reutelhuber
- League: Regionalliga Bayern (IV)
- 2025–26: Regionalliga Bayern, 10th of 18
Home colours	Away colours

SpVgg Ansbach is a German football club from the city of Ansbach, Bavaria.

The club's greatest league success came in 2001, when it earned promotion to the tier-three Regionalliga Süd, where it lasted for only one season. They returned to the Regionalliga in 2022. SpVgg Ansbach qualified for the German Cup on three occasions, reaching the second round once, in 1980–81.

== History ==
The club roots go back to the 1909 formation of a football department within the gymnastics club Turnverein 1860 Ansbach. The team disappeared for a period of three years during World War I but was re-formed in 1917 as the independent club Sportverein 1909 Ansbach by the footballers of TV and 1. FC 1912 Ansbach. A highlight of the club's early years came in 1928 with the capture of the A-Klasse Mittelfranken title and subsequent promotion playoff win over 1. FC Zirndorf that advanced the club to the second tier Kreisliga where they would compete until 1937.

Following World War II most organizations in the country, including sports and football clubs, were dissolved by occupying Allied authorities. The club was re-established in 1945 as Sportverein Ansbach out of the membership of a number of local sports clubs. On 30 November 1948, the association was renamed Turn- und Sportverein Ansbach and, in 1951, the footballers went their own way again as Spielvereinigung 1909 Ansbach.

The team advanced to the fourth tier 2nd Amateurliga Bayern in 1953 for a single season, and after being sent down, promptly returned in 1955. They played at that level until sent down through league restructuring in the early 60s. The club qualified for DFB Pokal (German Cup) play for the first time in 1981 and advanced out of the first round by defeating FSV Pfaffenhofen 1–0. In the next round they were soundly thrashed by second-division side Stuttgarter Kickers (0:13). Ansbach returned briefly to fourth-tier play in the Landesliga Bayern-Mitte in 1985 and again qualified to participate in the opening round of the DFB Pokal the same year where they were put out 0–3 by SV Waldhof Mannheim.

SpVgg spent eleven seasons in the Landesliga with a fifth place in 1993 as its best result, but was then relegated to the Bezirksoberliga Mittelfranken in 1996. This lasted for only one season, earning promotion straight back and returning to the Landesliga as a much more competitive side.

Ansbach enjoyed their best successes to date in the late 90s as they won promotion first to the Fußball-Bayernliga (IV) in 1999, and two seasons later, to the Regionalliga Süd (III). However, they had a difficult time in the third tier, and after a 12-game winless streak and a next to last place finish, the team was sent down.

The club continued to struggle after being sent down and narrowly missed relegation in each of the next two campaigns. They were finally relegated to the Landesliga Bayern (V) after a 15th-place finish in 2004–05. Ansbach promptly rebounded and on the strength of a division title in 2006–07 and won promotion back to the Fußball-Bayernliga (IV) for three seasons, before it was relegated again in 2010.

After only being saved from relegation from the Landesliga in 2012 by a league expansion Ansbach won the Landesliga Bayern-Nordwest in 2014 and earned promotion back to the Bayernliga. After a fifteenth place in 2014–15 the club had to enter the relegation round where it lost to 1. FC Bad Kötzting and was relegated. Ansbach won its Landesliga division in the following season and was promoted back to the Bayernliga.

== Honours ==
The club's honours:

=== League ===
- Bayernliga (IV)
  - Champions: 2001
  - Runners-up: 2022
- Landesliga Bayern-Mitte (V)
  - Champions: 2007
  - Runners-up: 1999
- Landesliga Bayern-Nordwest
  - Champions: 2014, 2016
- Bezirksoberliga Mittelfranken (VI)
  - Champions: 1997

=== Cup ===
- Bavarian Cup
  - Runners-up: 2008

== Players ==
As of 8 September 2026

Note: Flags indicate national team as defined under FIFA eligibility rules; some limited exceptions apply. Players may hold more than one non-FIFA nationality.

No.	Pos.	Nation	Player
1	GK	GER	Heiko Schiefer
2	DF	GER	Luca Beetz
6	MF	GER	Tobias Dietrich
7	FW	BIH	Dino Nuhanović
8	MF	GER	Björn Angermeier
9	FW	GER	Üveys Ayan
10	FW	GER	Patrick Kroiß
11	FW	GER	Ken Mata
14	MF	GER	Christopher Krez
15	DF	GER	Lukas Oberseider
16	MF	GER	Janis Gesell
17	MF	GER	Lukas Schmidt
18	MF	GER	Luis Althaus

No.	Pos.	Nation	Player
19	FW	GER	Dennis Stauber
20	FW	GER	Tyron Koomson
21	DF	GER	Mirko Puscher
22	DF	GER	Diego Collura
23	DF	GER	Matthias Hein
24	MF	GER	Ben Müller
25	DF	GER	Eric Weeger
27	MF	GER	Leon Stauber
28	FW	GER	Nico Hayer
29	DF	GER	Riko Manz
30	GK	GER	Nils Leidenberger
31	MF	TUR	Tarkan Üçüncü
-	MF	GER	Niklas Seefried

== Recent managers ==
Recent managers of the club:

Manager	Start	Finish
Hans-Jürgen Brunner	1 July 2003	12 December 2004
Reiner Eisenberger	1 July 2007	30 June 2009
Hans-Jürgen Brunner	1 July 2009	30 June 2010
Norbert Weidlein	1 July 2016	30 June 2017
Duane Carl Collins	1 July 2017	30 June 2019
Christoph Hasselmeier	28 August 2019	Present

== Recent seasons ==
The recent season-by-season performance of the club:

Season	Division	Tier	Position
1999–2000	Bayernliga	IV	10th
2000–01	Bayernliga	IV	1st ↑
2001–02	Regionalliga Süd	III	17th ↓
2002–03	Bayernliga	IV	13th
2003–04	Bayernliga	IV	14th
2004–05	Bayernliga	IV	15th ↓
2005–06	Landesliga Bayern-Mitte	V	8th
2006–07	Landesliga Bayern-Mitte	V	1st ↑
2007–08	Bayernliga	IV	13th
2008–09	Bayernliga	V	12th
2009–10	Bayernliga	V	15th ↓
2010–11	Landesliga Bayern-Mitte	VI	9th
2011–12	Landesliga Bayern-Mitte	VI	17th
2012–13	Landesliga Bayern-Mitte	VI	4th
2013–14	Landesliga Bayern-Nordwest	VI	1st ↑
2014–15	Bayernliga Nord	V	15th ↓
2015–16	Landesliga Bayern-Nordwest	VI	1st ↑
2016–17	Bayernliga Nord	V	13th
2017–18	Bayernliga Nord	V	7th
2018–19	Bayernliga Nord	V	11th
2019–21	Bayernliga Nord	V	6th
2021–22	Bayernliga Nord	V	2nd ↑
2022–23	Regionalliga Bayern	IV	15th
2023–24	Regionalliga Bayern	IV	13th
2024–25	Regionalliga Bayern	IV	10th
2025–26	Regionalliga Bayern	IV	10th

- With the introduction of the Bezirksoberligas in 1988 as the new fifth tier, below the Landesligas, all leagues below dropped one tier. With the introduction of the Regionalligas in 1994 and the 3. Liga in 2008 as the new third tier, below the 2. Bundesliga, all leagues below dropped one tier. With the establishment of the Regionalliga Bayern as the new fourth tier in Bavaria in 2012 the Bayernliga was split into a northern and a southern division, the number of Landesligas expanded from three to five and the Bezirksoberligas abolished. All leagues from the Bezirksligas onwards were elevated one tier.

↑ Promoted	↓ Relegated

== Stadium ==
Since 1976 the club has played its home matches at the Sportpark Ansbach which has a capacity of 5,000 (1,000 seats).

== DFB Cup appearances ==
The club has qualified for the first round of the German Cup three times:

Season	Round	Date	Home	Away	Result	Attendance
DFB Cup 1980-81	First round	28 August 1980	SpVgg Ansbach	FSV Pfaffenhofen	1–0	
DFB Cup 1980-81	Second round	4 October 1980	Stuttgarter Kickers	SpVgg Ansbach	13–0	
DFB Cup 1985-86	First round	24 August 1985	SpVgg Ansbach	Waldhof Mannheim	0–2	
DFB Cup 2008-09	First round	10 August 2008	SpVgg Ansbach	Karlsruher SC	0–5	4,000

== American football department ==
From 1979 to 1981, the club was home to an American football department, the Ansbach Grizzlies. The Grizzlies were a successful team during the early days of the game in Germany, reaching every German Bowl from 1979 to 1986 and winning it in 1981, 1982 and 1985. In 1981, this department however went its own way, separating from the SpVgg.
