= Mohamad Awata =

Syrian footballer (born 1993)

Personal information
- Date of birth: July 10, 1993 (age 33)
- Place of birth: Damascus, Syria
- Height: 1.87 m (6 ft 2 in)
- Positions: Winger; forward

Team information
- Current team: SV Heimstetten
- Number: 70

Senior career*
Years	Team	Apps	(Gls)
–2014	Al-Wahda		
2017–2018	1860 Munich II	36	(10)
2017–2018	1860 Munich	2	(1)
2018	Al-Jazeera Club	2	(0)
2019	SV Heimstetten	13	(4)
2019–2020	Schweinfurt 05	17	(0)
2020–	SV Heimstetten	3	(2)

International career
- Syria U21
- Syria U23
- * Club domestic league appearances and goals as of 19:58, 28 June 2021 (UTC)

Mohamad Awata (born July 10, 1993) is a Syrian footballer who plays as a winger or forward for German club SV Heimstetten.

== Playing career ==
Awata turned professional in his home country at the age of 16. As a member of Al-Wahda, a Premier League club in his native Damascus, he won the 2014 league title. He also made one appearance at the 2013 AFC Cup during a qualifying play-off match against Al-Ahli Taizz.

However, in the summer of 2016, he was forced to flee his country due to the raging civil war, in which his mother and uncle were killed when his house was bombed. He travelled to Turkey by land, then to Greece by sea, eventually settling in Germany. While in Stuttgart, he was allowed to train with SV Sillenbuch, a local amateur side.

In the summer of 2016, a friend of his recommended him to the coach of 1860 Munich, Daniel Bierofka, who welcomed him onto the team with open arms after an impressive tryout. It took the DFB nine months to clear him to play, during which he trained strictly with the under-21 squad. After obtaining a special permit, he was able to sign an official contract with the club in January 2017. He made his debut with the reserve team two months later, during a 1–0 Regionalliga win against Memmingen. He made seven total appearances that season, but failed to score in any.

The first team was relegated from 2. Bundesliga, and failed to obtain a license to play in 3. Liga for the 2017–18 season, forcing them to compete in Regionalliga. Bierofka was moved up to coach the first team, and Awata was among the dozen players he brought up with him. He made his first-team debut on September 23, replacing Markus Ziereis in the late minutes of a win against Unterföhring. He scored his first goal in his second match, a 4–1 victory over Bayreuth on the final matchday of the season. He also added two assists as Munich finished as league champions and earned promotion into the 3. Liga. For his goal-scoring celebration, he tore off his shirt and kissed the running track, immediately earning him a yellow card.

That same season, he also made 29 appearances for the reserve team (now playing in the fifth-tier Bayernliga), with all but one as a part of the starting lineup. He led his team in scoring with 10 goals, with 8 of them coming in the first 12 matches.

In August 2018, Awata signed with Jordanian Pro League club Al-Jazeera Club. He made one appearance at the 2018 AFC Cup during a knockout stage match against Al-Quwa Al-Jawiya in September.

== Honours ==
=== Club ===
Al-Wahda

- Syrian Premier League: 2014

1860 Munich

- Regionalliga Bayern: 2017–18
