= Nicolas Andermatt =

Swiss footballer (born 1995)

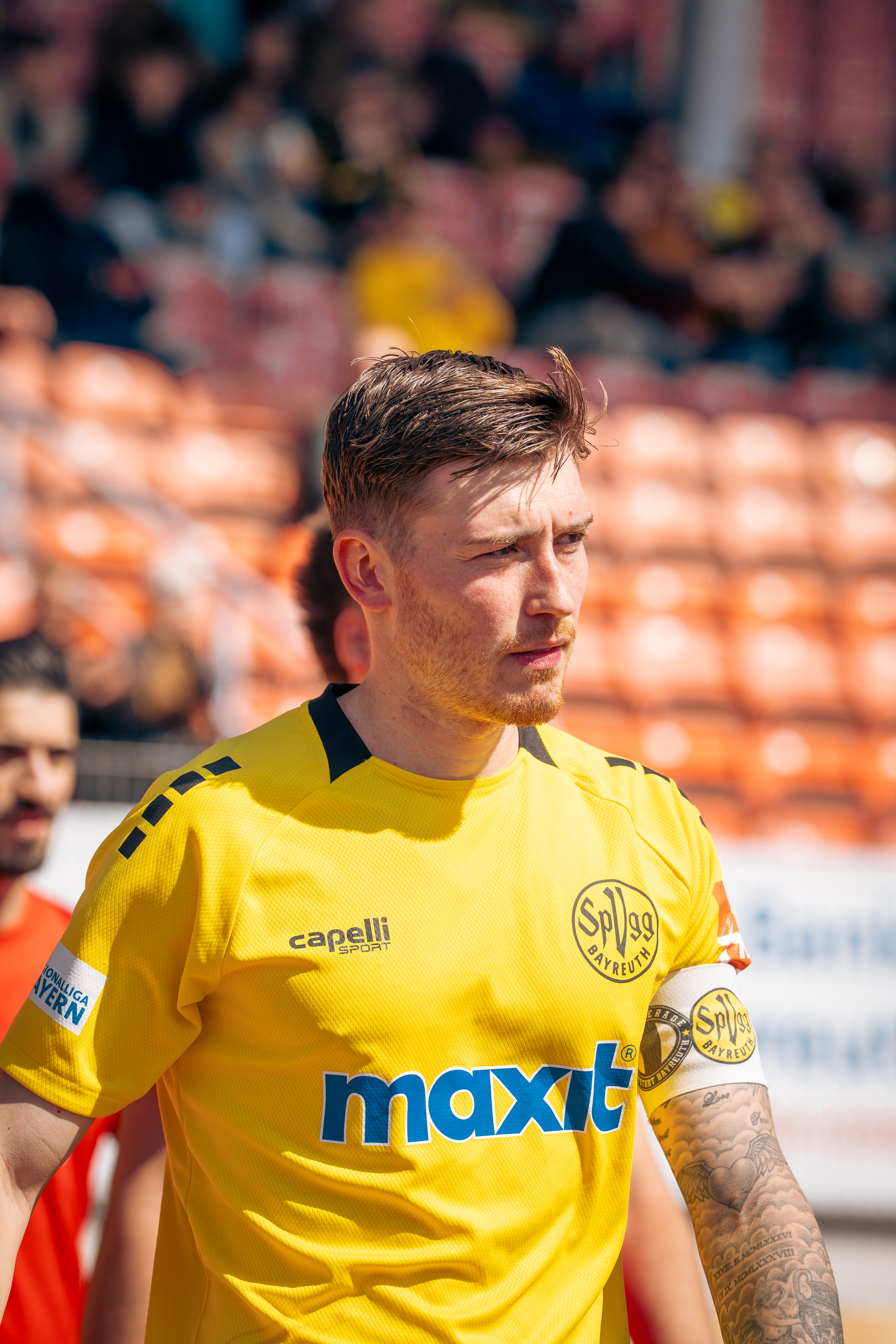
- Andermatt in 2026.

Personal information
- Date of birth: 6 November 1995 (age 30)
- Place of birth: Baar, Switzerland
- Height: 1.85 m (6 ft 1 in)
- Position: Midfielder

Team information
- Current team: FC 08 Homburg
- Number: 6

Youth career
- SC Kriens
- –2013: Zürich

Senior career*
Years	Team	Apps	(Gls)
2013–2014	Zürich II	3	(0)
2014	→ Zug 94 (loan)	8	(2)
2014–2015	Zug 94	23	(7)
2015–2016	1860 Munich II	33	(5)
2016–2017	Wacker Burghausen	18	(0)
2017	1860 Munich II	9	(2)
2017–2018	1860 Munich	19	(1)
2019	1. FC Schweinfurt	12	(1)
2019–2021	SV Meppen	42	(0)
2021–2023	SpVgg Bayreuth	45	(3)
2023	SKU Amstetten	4	(0)
2024–2026	SpVgg Bayreuth	45	(5)
2026–	FC 08 Homburg	8	(0)

International career
2013	Switzerland U18	1	(0)
- * Club domestic league appearances and goals as of 24 September 2026

Nicolas Andermatt (born 6 November 1995) is a Swiss professional footballer who plays as a midfielder for FC 08 Homburg.

== Club career ==
Andermatt made his professional debut for SV Meppen in the 3. Liga on 31 July 2019, coming on as a substitute in the 69th minute for Max Kremer in the 4–2 away win against Chemnitzer FC.

In October 2023, Andermatt signed for Austrian 2. Liga club SKU Amstetten.

== International career ==
Andermatt made one appearance for the Switzerland under-18 national team, featuring as a substitute in a 3–1 win against Slovenia on 17 April 2013.

== Personal life ==
Andermatt's father, Martin, is a former Swiss international footballer and current manager.

== Honours ==
SpVgg Bayreuth

- Regionalliga Bayern: 2021–22
