= Niklas Heidemann =

German footballer

Personal information
- Date of birth: 6 January 1995 (age 31)
- Place of birth: Schwerte, Germany
- Height: 1.85 m (6 ft 1 in)
- Position: Defender

Youth career
- –2010: Borussia Dortmund
- 2010–2012: Preußen Münster
- 2012–2013: SG Wattenscheid
- 2013–2014: MSV Duisburg

Senior career*
| Years | Team | Apps | (Gls) |
| 2014–2016 | MSV Duisburg II | 42 | (1) |
| 2014–2015 | MSV Duisburg | 0 | (0) |
| 2016–2018 | Wuppertaler SV | 60 | (1) |
| 2018–2021 | Preußen Münster | 85 | (1) |
| 2021–2022 | Wuppertaler SV | 31 | (2) |
- * Club domestic league appearances and goals

Niklas Heidemann (born 6 January 1995) is a German former professional footballer who played as a defender.
