= Simon Seferings =

German association football player

Personal information
- Full name: Simon Seferings
- Date of birth: 5 July 1995 (age 31)
- Place of birth: Eschweiler, Germany
- Height: 1.85 m (6 ft 1 in)
- Position: Midfielder

Team information
- Current team: Saburtalo Tbilisi
- Number: 20

Youth career
- –2010: Alemannia Aachen
- 2010–2014: Bayern Munich

Senior career*
Years	Team	Apps	(Gls)
2013–2014	Bayern Munich II	1	(0)
2014–2015	SV Heimstetten	19	(1)
2015–2017	1860 Munich II	40	(6)
2017–2020	1860 Munich	14	(3)
2019	→ VfR Garching (loan)	13	(8)
2020–2021	Alemannia Aachen	15	(1)
2021–	Saburtalo Tbilisi	1	(1)
- * Club domestic league appearances and goals as of 18 September 2021

Simon Seferings (born 5 July 1995) is a German footballer who plays as an attacking midfielder for Saburtalo Tbilisi.

== Career ==
Seferings made his professional debut for 1860 Munich in the 3. Liga on 19 July 2019, starting in the home match against Preußen Münster before being substituted out at half-time for Dennis Dressel, which finished as a 1–1 draw.
