= Kilian Jakob =

German footballer

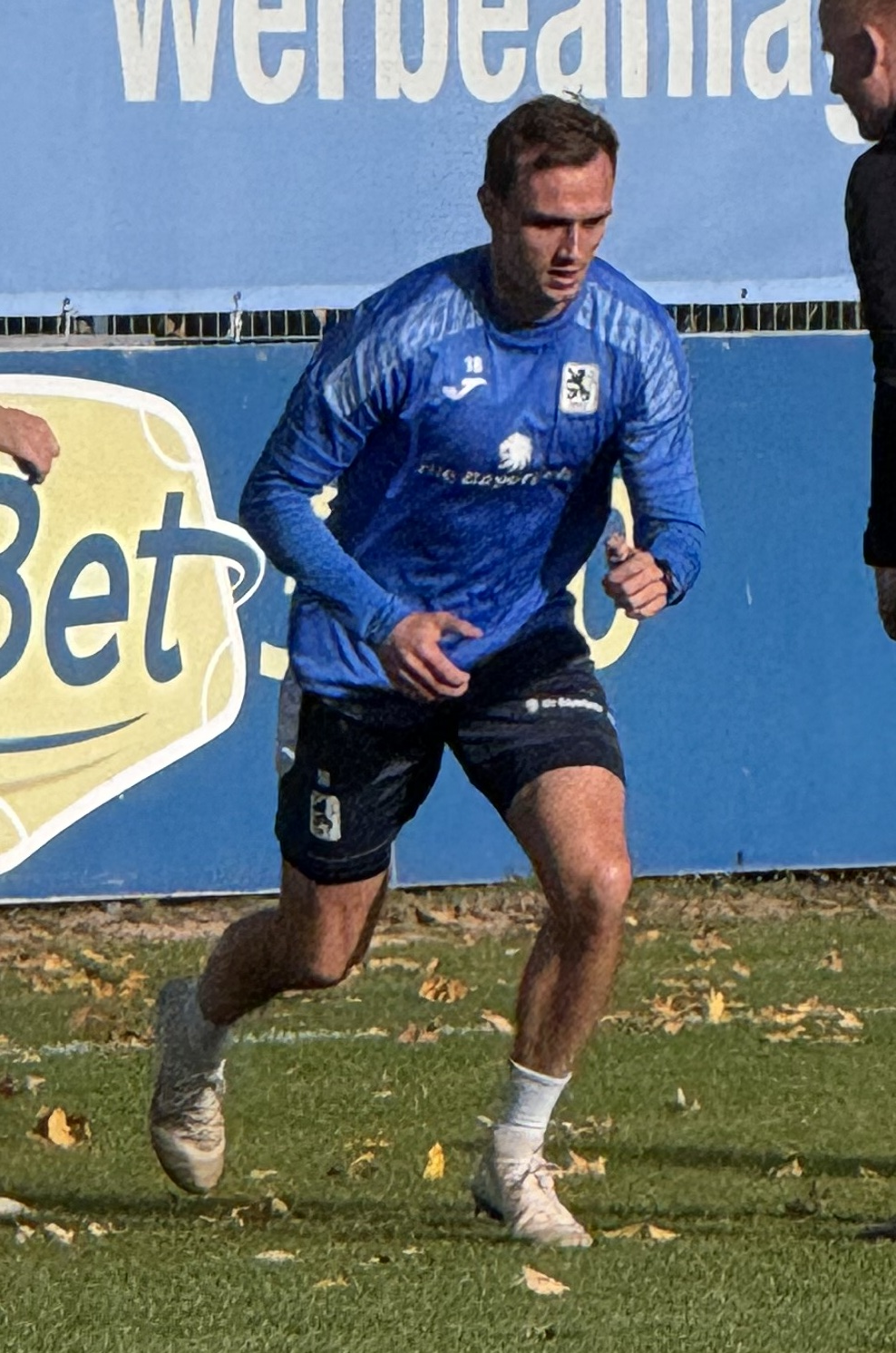
- Jakob training with 1860 Munich in 2025

Personal information
- Date of birth: 25 January 1998 (age 28)
- Place of birth: Bad Neuenahr-Ahrweiler, Germany
- Height: 1.80 m (5 ft 11 in)
- Position: Left-back

Team information
- Current team: Viktoria Köln
- Number: 26

Youth career
- FC Dreistern-Neutrudering
- –2016: 1860 Munich

Senior career*
Years	Team	Apps	(Gls)
2016–2017	1860 Munich II	10	(1)
2016–2017	1860 Munich	4	(0)
2017–2021	FC Augsburg II	47	(6)
2017–2019	FC Augsburg	1	(0)
2021	→ Türkgücü München (loan)	14	(1)
2021–2022	Karlsruher SC	16	(0)
2023–2025	Erzgebirge Aue	66	(5)
2025–2026	1860 Munich	10	(0)
2026–	Viktoria Köln	0	(0)

International career
2015	Germany U18	2	(0)
- * Club domestic league appearances and goals as of 28 May 2026

Kilian Jakob (born 25 January 1998) is a German professional footballer who plays as a left-back for 3. Liga club Viktoria Köln.

== Club career ==
On 19 December 2022, Jakob signed a contract with Erzgebirge Aue, effective on 1 January 2023.

In June 2025, Jakob returned to 1860 Munich.

On 23 July 2026, Jakob moved to Viktoria Köln in 3. Liga.
