= Yannick Osée =

German footballer

Personal information
- Date of birth: 13 June 1997 (age 29)
- Place of birth: Kaiserslautern, Germany
- Height: 1.94 m (6 ft 4 in)
- Position: Defender

Team information
- Current team: SGV Freiberg
- Number: 13

Youth career
- TSG Kaiserslautern
- 1. FC Kaiserslautern
- –2016: FK Pirmasens

Senior career*
Years	Team	Apps	(Gls)
2016–2019	FK Pirmasens II	40	(1)
2016–2019	FK Pirmasens	65	(7)
2019–2023	SV Meppen	67	(1)
2023–	SGV Freiberg	44	(5)
- * Club domestic league appearances and goals as of 1 January 2025

Yannick Osée (born 13 June 1997) is a German professional footballer who plays as a defender for SGV Freiberg.
