= Marcel Gottschling =

German footballer (born 1994)

Personal information
- Date of birth: 14 May 1994 (age 32)
- Place of birth: Oldenburg, Germany
- Height: 1.85 m (6 ft 1 in)
- Position: Midfielder

Team information
- Current team: SV Wilhelmshaven
- Number: 13

Youth career
- 2002–2013: VfB Oldenburg

Senior career*
Years	Team	Apps	(Gls)
2013–2015	VfB Oldenburg II	23	(1)
2013–2015	VfB Oldenburg	32	(3)
2015–2016	Hansa Rostock	20	(0)
2016	Hansa Rostock II	9	(4)
2016–2017	Viktoria Köln	26	(3)
2017–2018	SSV Jeddeloh	31	(4)
2018–2021	Viktoria Köln	58	(0)
2021–2022	Waldhof Mannheim	15	(0)
2022–2024	SSV Jeddeloh	41	(3)
2025–	SV Wilhelmshaven	16	(0)
- * Club domestic league appearances and goals as of 30 June 2026

Marcel Gottschling (born 14 May 1994) is a German professional footballer who plays as a midfielder for SV Wilhelmshaven.

== Early life ==
Gottschling was born in Oldenburg.

== Career ==
Gottschling joined the academy of hometown club VfB Oldenburg in 2002. Having previously played for their reserve side, Gottschling made his debut for their first team on 30 November 2013 in a 2–0 Regionalliga Nord win away to Eintracht Braunschweig II. After coming on as a substitute to make his debut in the 70th minute, Gottschling scored his first senior goal in the 89th minute to put Oldenburg 2–0 up. He made 8 appearances for Oldenburg's first team, scoring once, across the 2013–14 season. He played 24 times for Oldenburg during the 2014–15 season, scoring two goals.

Gottschling joined 3. Liga club Hansa Rostock on a three-year contract. He made his professional debut for Hansa Rostock in the 3. Liga on 25 July 2015, coming on as a substitute in the 72nd minute for Michael Gardawski in the 2–1 away defeat to Werder Bremen II. After making 20 league appearances for Hansa Rostock over the 2015–16 season, he left the club at the end of the season despite having two years remaining on his contract.

In July 2016, Gottschling signed for Regionalliga West side Viktoria Köln on a one-year contract. Gottschling made his debut for the club in a 4–1 defeat at home to Borussia Mönchengladbach II on 6 August 2016. He played 26 times for Viktoria across the regular season as they finished first and qualified for the promotion play-offs. He played in both legs of their promotion play-off match with Carl Zeiss Jena as Viktoria missed out on promotion due to the away-goals rule. He left Viktoria Köln at the end of the season following the expiry of his contract.

He joined SSV Jeddeloh in summer 2018, where he made 28 appearances in the 2017–18 Regionalliga Nord. On 25 August 2018, his contract at SSV Jeddeloh was terminated by mutual consent after three league appearances in the 2018–19 season.

After one year at SSV Jeddeloh, Gottschling returned to Viktoria Köln in August 2018. He made 15 league appearances for Viktoria Köln in the 2018–19 season as they finished top and were promoted to the 3. Liga. In June 2019, he extended his contract by a further year. He made 33 league appearances in the 2019–20 3. Liga, and 10 league appearances in the 2020–21 3. Liga.

On 14 January 2021, Gottschling signed for Waldhof Mannheim following the termination of his contract at Viktoria Köln. He left the club at the end of the 2021–22 season, having made 16 appearances in all competitions for the club.

In July 2022, he returned to SSV Jeddeloh. Following a red card in a match against TSV Havelse in April 2024, Gottschling was suspended by the club for the rest of the season, and at the end of the season, he was released by the club, having played 41 times and scored 3 goals.

In July 2025, Gottschling signed for SV Wilhelmshaven.
