= Matti Langer =

German footballer

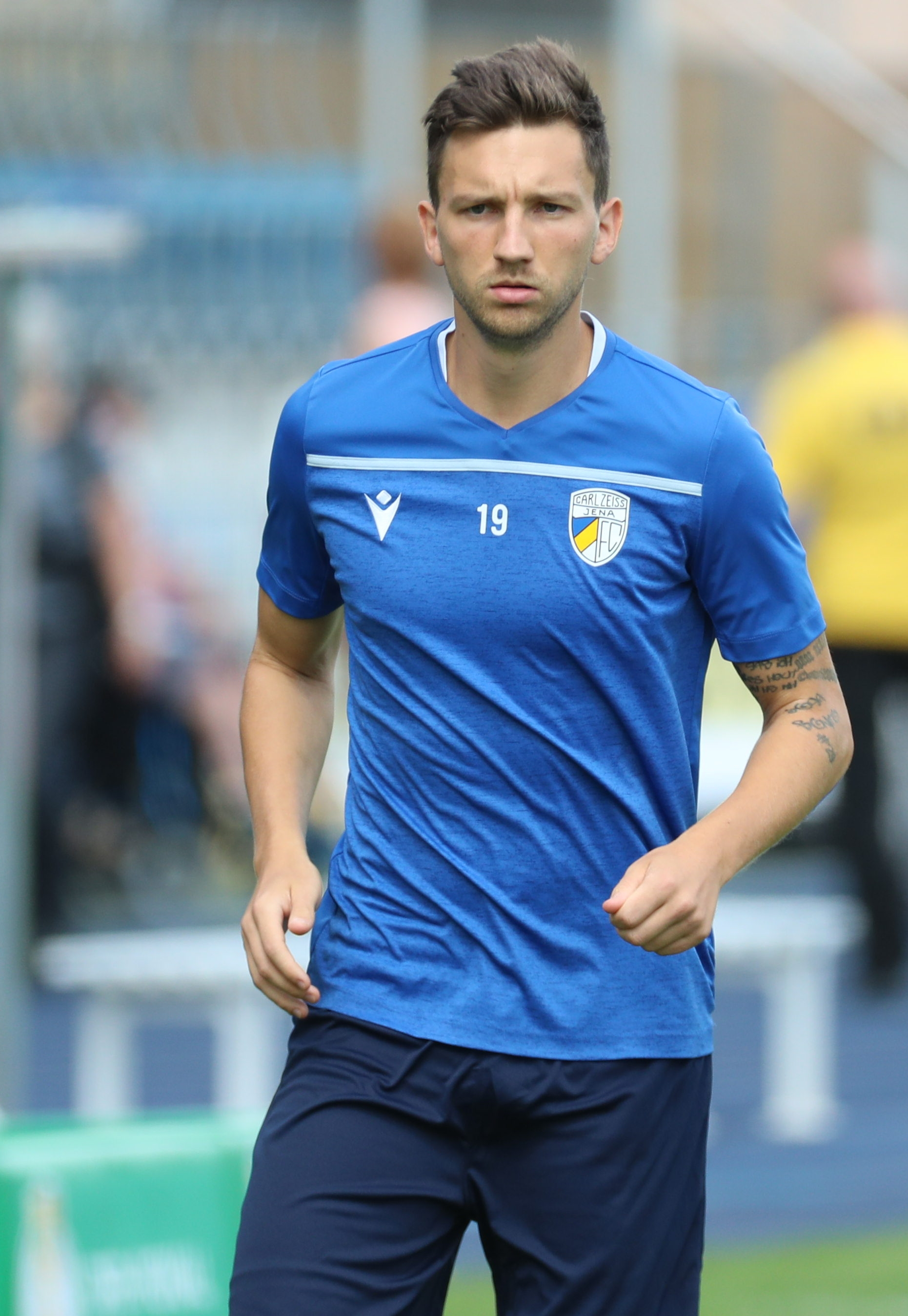
- Langer in 2021

Personal information
- Date of birth: 27 February 1990 (age 36)
- Place of birth: Erfurt, East Germany
- Height: 1.89 m (6 ft 2 in)
- Position: Midfielder

Youth career
- –2000: TSG Stotternheim
- 2000–2009: Rot-Weiß Erfurt

Senior career*
Years	Team	Apps	(Gls)
2009–2011	Rot-Weiß Erfurt II	53	(5)
2009	Rot-Weiß Erfurt	1	(0)
2011–2016	Wacker Nordhausen	129	(8)
2013–2016	Wacker Nordhausen II	6	(2)
2016–2017	SC Freiburg II	30	(6)
2017–2018	Greuther Fürth II	26	(3)
2017–2018	Greuther Fürth	1	(0)
2018–2020	Chemnitzer FC	56	(7)
2020–2022	FC Carl Zeiss Jena	29	(1)
2022	FC Carl Zeiss Jena II	5	(0)
- * Club domestic league appearances and goals

Matti Langer (born 27 February 1990) is a German former footballer who played as a midfielder.
