= Christoph Buchner =

German footballer

Personal information
- Date of birth: 23 July 1989 (age 37)
- Place of birth: Trostberg, West Germany
- Height: 1.87 m (6 ft 2 in)
- Position: Defender

Youth career
- –2001: TuS Garching
- 2001–2008: Wacker Burghausen

Senior career*
Years	Team	Apps	(Gls)
2008–2009	Wacker Burghausen	20	(1)
2009–2010	1. FC Kaiserslautern II	18	(2)
2009–2010	1. FC Kaiserslautern	0	(0)
2010–2011	1. FC Saarbrücken	26	(0)
2011–2012	FC Lustenau 07	21	(1)
2012–2013	Chemnitzer FC II	11	(1)
2012–2013	Chemnitzer FC	11	(0)
2013–2016	Eintracht Trier	71	(7)
2016–2017	TuS Koblenz	26	(0)
2017–2020	SV Wacker Burghausen	75	(3)
2020–2021	FC Töging		
Total		279	(15)
- * Club domestic league appearances and goals

Christoph Buchner (born 23 July 1989) is a German former professional footballer who played as a defender.
