= Kodjovi Koussou =

Togolese footballer

Nono Koussou
Personal information
- Full name: Kodjovi Albano Koussou
- Date of birth: 22 June 1992 (age 34)
- Place of birth: Lomé, Togo
- Height: 1.69 m (5 ft 7 in)
- Position: Midfielder

Youth career
- –2013: SpVgg Thalkirchen
- 2003–2011: 1860 Munich

Senior career*
Years	Team	Apps	(Gls)
2011–2014	1860 Munich II	52	(1)
2012–2014	1860 Munich	3	(0)
2014–2015	Bayern Munich II	14	(0)
2016–2019	1860 Munich II	27	(1)
2017–2019	1860 Munich	32	(1)
2019–2020	SpVgg Bayreuth	7	(0)
- * Club domestic league appearances and goals as of 23:43, 20 December 2020 (UTC)

Kodjovi Albano "Nono" Koussou (born 22 June 1992) is a Togolese professional footballer who plays as a midfielder.

== Career ==
Kousso is a youth exponent from 1860 Munich, who mainly played for the second team. After his contract was not extended in 2014 he signed with city rival Bayern Munich II. Only after a year, he left Bayern Munich II again. After one year without a club, he returned to 1860 Munich II again in 2016.

== Personal life ==
He also holds German citizenship.
