= Leon Klassen =

Russian footballer

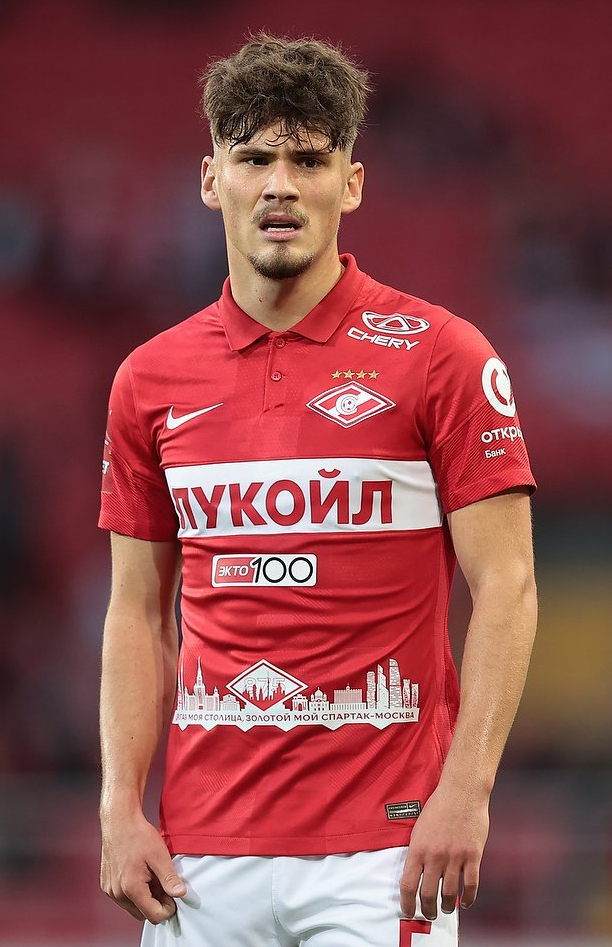
- Klassen with Spartak Moscow in 2022

Personal information
- Date of birth: 29 May 2000 (age 26)
- Place of birth: Bad Neuenahr-Ahrweiler, Germany
- Height: 1.74 m (5 ft 9 in)
- Position: Left-back

Team information
- Current team: Grazer AK

Youth career
- SC Bad Bodendorf
- –2017: 1. FC Köln
- 2017–2018: 1860 Munich

Senior career*
Years	Team	Apps	(Gls)
2017–2021	1860 Munich II	35	(2)
2018–2021	1860 Munich	27	(2)
2021	Tirol	17	(0)
2022–2024	Spartak Moscow	18	(0)
2024–2025	Lyngby	22	(1)
2025–2026	SV Darmstadt	5	(0)
2026	→ Grazer AK (loan)	15	(1)
2026–	Grazer AK	0	(0)

International career^{‡}
2017	Russia U17	3	(0)
2017	Russia U18	1	(0)
2018	Russia U19	3	(0)
2021	Russia U21	1	(0)
- * Club domestic league appearances and goals as of 10 June 2026 ‡ National team caps and goals as of 12 October 2021

Leon Klassen (Russian: Леон Классен; born 29 May 2000) is a professional footballer who plays as a left-back for Austrian Football Bundesliga club Grazer AK. Born in Germany, he has represented Russia at various youth levels.

== Career ==
Klassen made his professional debut in the 3. Liga for 1860 Munich on 31 July 2019, coming on as a substitute in the 87th minute for Benjamin Kindsvater against FSV Zwickau. He assisted Herbert Paul for Munich's third goal, with the match finishing as a 3–0 home win.

On 27 May 2021, he signed with WSG Tirol in Austria.

On 30 December 2021, he signed a 3.5-year contract with Russian Premier League club FC Spartak Moscow. Klassen left Spartak by mutual consent on 27 June 2024.

On 29 August 2024, Klassen signed a two-year contract with Lyngby in Denmark.

Klassen joined SV Darmstadt on 21 June 2025. On 20 January 2026, he was loaned by Grazer AK in Austria.

On 9 July 2026, Klassen returned to Grazer AK on a permanent basis and signed a three-year contract with the club.

== International career ==
Klassen was born in Germany to a Russian parents; his mother is of German descent. He is a youth international for Russia.

== Career statistics ==
As of match played 25 May 2024

Appearances and goals by club, season and competition
Club	Season	League			Cup		Continental		Other		Total	
Club	Season	Division	Apps	Goals	Apps	Goals	Apps	Goals	Apps	Goals	Apps	Goals
TSV 1860 Munich II	2017–18	Bayernliga	14	1	—		—		—		14	1
TSV 1860 Munich II	2018–19	Bayernliga	20	1	—		—		—		20	1
TSV 1860 Munich II	2020–21	Bayernliga	1	0	—		—		—		1	0
TSV 1860 Munich II	Total		35	2	0	0	0	0	0	0	35	2
TSV 1860 Munich	2017–18	Regionalliga Bayern	1	0	—		—		—		1	0
TSV 1860 Munich	2018–19	3. Liga	0	0	0	0	—		2 (Note: Appearances in the Bavarian Cup)	0	2	0
TSV 1860 Munich	2019–20	3. Liga	19	2	—		—		4	1	23	3
TSV 1860 Munich	2020–21	3. Liga	7	0	0	0	—		2	0	9	0
TSV 1860 Munich	Total		27	2	0	0	0	0	8	1	35	3
WSG Tirol	2021–22	Austrian Bundesliga	17	0	3	0	—		—		20	0
Spartak Moscow	2021–22	Russian Premier League	2	0	1	0	—		—		3	0
Spartak Moscow	2022–23	Russian Premier League	11	0	7	0	—		—		18	0
Spartak Moscow	2023–24	Russian Premier League	5	0	6	2	—		—		11	2
Spartak Moscow	Total		18	0	14	2	0	0	0	0	32	2
Career total			97	4	17	2	0	0	8	1	122	7

== Honours ==
TSV 1860 Munich

- Regionalliga Bayern: 2017–18
- Bavarian Cup: 2020

Spartak Moscow

- Russian Cup: 2021–22
