= Jonas Hofmann (footballer, born 1997) =

German footballer

Personal information
- Full name: Jonas Hofmann
- Date of birth: 7 February 1997 (age 29)
- Place of birth: Bamberg, Germany
- Height: 1.74 m (5 ft 9 in)
- Position: Midfielder

Team information
- Current team: Energie Cottbus
- Number: 6

Youth career
- 1. FC Falke Röbersdorf
- –2005: SpVgg Etzelskirchen
- 2005–2016: 1. FC Nürnberg

Senior career*
Years	Team	Apps	(Gls)
2016–2018	1. FC Nürnberg II	61	(4)
2018–2019	Sportfreunde Lotte	30	(2)
2019–2020	Schalke 04 II	26	(1)
2020	Schalke 04	1	(0)
2020–	Energie Cottbus	118	(3)

International career
2012	Germany U15	4	(1)
2012–2013	Germany U16	2	(0)
- * Club domestic league appearances and goals as of 8 October 2025

Jonas Hofmann (born 7 February 1997) is a German footballer who plays as a midfielder for Energie Cottbus. He made his debut for the Schalke 04 first-team in 2020, coming off the bench against Bayer Leverkusen in a 1–1 draw.
