= Daniel Wein =

German footballer

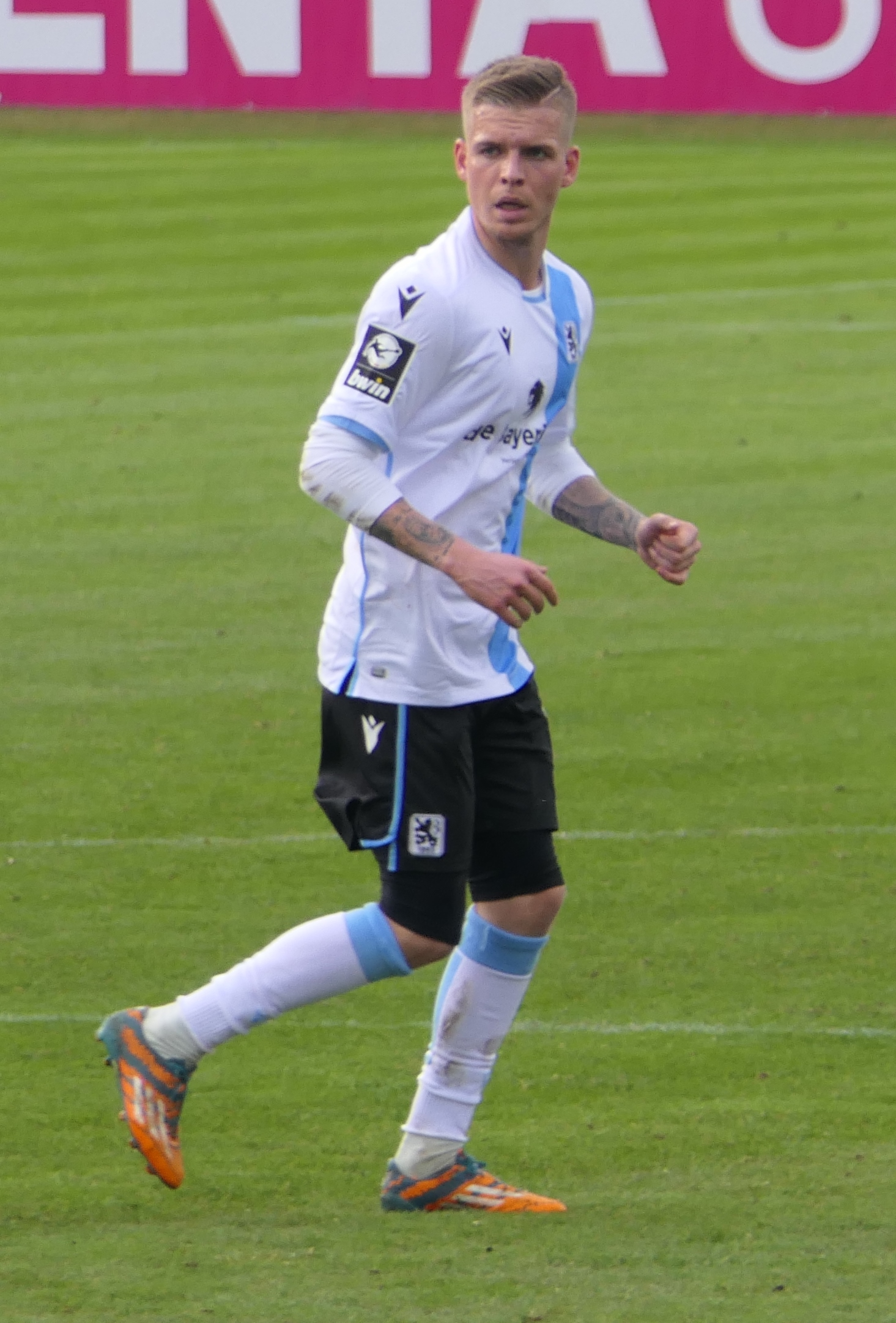
- Wein in 2020

Personal information
- Date of birth: 5 February 1994 (age 32)
- Place of birth: Munich, Germany
- Height: 1.84 m (6 ft 0 in)
- Position: Centre-back

Youth career
- –2012: Bayern Munich

Senior career*
Years	Team	Apps	(Gls)
2012–2014	Bayern Munich II	46	(1)
2014–2017	Wehen Wiesbaden	48	(0)
2017–2023	1860 Munich	155	(8)
2022	1860 Munich II	1	(0)

International career
2012	Germany U18	2	(0)
2012	Germany U19	1	(0)
- * Club domestic league appearances and goals as of 27 May 2023

Daniel Wein (born 5 February 1994) is a German professional footballer who plays as a defender. He was born in Munich, Germany, and stands 1.84 meters tall. Wein has previously represented Germany at the U19 level, earning 1 cap.

Wein most recently played for TSV 1860 Munich, where he was a key player in their promotion to the 3rd league in the 2017/18 season. He also helped the team win the Bavarian Cup in the 2019/20 season. Prior to his time with 1860 Munich, Wein played for SV Wehen Wiesbaden, where he won the Hessen Cup in 2016/17. Earlier in his career, Wein was part of FC Bayern Munich U19, where he won the German Under-19 Bundesliga South/South-west championship in the 2011/12 season.

As of 1 July 2023, Wein is without a club. Throughout his career, he has achieved success in the German Regionalliga Bavaria, winning the championship twice, in the 2013/14 and 2017/18 seasons.

== Career statistics ==
- Squad: 26
- Starting appearances: 10
- Substituted in: 3
- On the bench: 13
- Suspended: 0
- Injuries: 5
- Absences: 0
