= Felix Weber (footballer) =

German footballer (born 1995)

Personal information
- Date of birth: 18 January 1995 (age 31)
- Place of birth: Weilheim in Oberbayern, Germany
- Height: 1.84 m (6 ft 0 in)
- Position: Centre-back

Team information
- Current team: 1860 Munich
- Number: 4

Youth career
- SV Ohlstadt
- –2013: 1860 Munich

Senior career*
Years	Team	Apps	(Gls)
2013–2017	1860 Munich II	80	(7)
2017–2020	1860 Munich	82	(7)
2020–2021	Rot-Weiss Essen	6	(0)
2021–2023	SpVgg Bayreuth	58	(5)
2023–2024	FC 08 Homburg	21	(2)
2024–2026	DJK Vilzing	53	(10)
2026–	1860 Munich	8	(1)

International career^{‡}
2009	Germany U15	1	(0)
- * Club domestic league appearances and goals as of 27 September 2026 ‡ National team caps and goals as of 15:09, 31 July 2017 (UTC)

Felix Weber (born 18 January 1995) is a German professional footballer who plays as a centre-back for 1860 Munich.

== Honours ==
SpVgg Bayreuth

- Regionalliga Bayern: 2021–22
