= Eric Weeger =

German footballer

Personal information
- Full name: Eric Weeger
- Date of birth: 2 February 1997 (age 29)
- Place of birth: Wolframs-Eschenbach, Germany
- Height: 1.79 m (5 ft 10 in)
- Position: Defender

Team information
- Current team: SpVgg Ansbach
- Number: 25

Youth career
- SpVgg/DJK Wolframs-Eschenbach
- –2011: SpVgg Ansbach
- 2011–2016: 1860 Munich

Senior career*
Years	Team	Apps	(Gls)
2016–2017	1860 Munich II	33	(1)
2017–2020	1860 Munich	40	(1)
2020–	SpVgg Ansbach	164	(22)
- * Club domestic league appearances and goals as of 24 September 2026

Eric Weeger (born 2 February 1997) is a German professional footballer who plays as a defender for SpVgg Ansbach.

== Career ==
Weeger made his professional debut in the 3. Liga for 1860 Munich on 10 November 2018, starting before being substituted off in the 55th minute for Marius Willsch in the 1–1 home draw against Hallescher FC.

Following the expiry of his contract at 1860 Munich, he signed for SpVgg Ansbach in September 2020.
