= Max Kremer =

German footballer

Personal information
- Date of birth: 21 June 1989 (age 37)
- Place of birth: Pavlodar, Kazakh SSR, Soviet Union
- Height: 1.76 m (5 ft 9 in)
- Position: Midfielder

Team information
- Current team: Sportfreunde Lotte
- Number: 17

Youth career
- 1997–2008: Hansa Rostock

Senior career*
| Years | Team | Apps | (Gls) |
| 2008–2012 | Hansa Rostock II | 77 | (20) |
| 2008–2009 | → Greifswalder SV 04 (loan) | 22 | (9) |
| 2012–2013 | SV Wilhelmshaven | 29 | (12) |
| 2013–2020 | SV Meppen | 171 | (50) |
| 2020–2022 | Energie Cottbus | 30 | (4) |
| 2022– | Sportfreunde Lotte | 8 | (2) |
- * Club domestic league appearances and goals as of 13 November 2022

Max Kremer (born 21 June 1989) is a German professional footballer who plays as a midfielder for Sportfreunde Lotte.
