= Nico Karger =

German footballer

Personal information
- Date of birth: 1 February 1993 (age 33)
- Place of birth: Kronach, Germany
- Height: 1.78 m (5 ft 10 in)
- Position: Forward

Team information
- Current team: SV Nord Lerchenau
- Number: 30

Youth career
- 2010–2012: 1860 Munich

Senior career*
Years	Team	Apps	(Gls)
2010–	1860 Munich II	94	(20)
2015–2020	1860 Munich	83	(19)
2020–2022	SV Elversberg	45	(9)
2022–2023	FC Deisenhofen	28	(21)
2023–2024	TSV Landsberg	29	(22)
2024–2026	FC Pipinsried	52	(33)
2026–	SV Nord Lerchenau	6	(4)
- * Club domestic league appearances and goals as of 11:54, 21 August 2026 (UTC)

Nico Karger (born 1 February 1993) is a German footballer who plays as a forward for Landesliga Bayern-Südost club SV Nord Lerchenau.

== Career statistics ==
As of match played 1 July 2020

Appearances and goals by club, season and competition
Club	Season	League			DFB-Pokal		Other		Total	
Club	Season	Division	Apps	Goals	Apps	Goals	Apps	Goals	Apps	Goals
1860 Munich II	2010–11	Regionalliga Süd	2	0	—		—		2	0
1860 Munich II	2011–12	Regionalliga Süd	1	0	—		—		1	0
1860 Munich II	2012–13	Regionalliga Bayern	26	3	—		1 (Note: Appearance(s) in promotion play-offs)	0	27	3
1860 Munich II	2013–14	Regionalliga Bayern	16	1	—		—		16	1
1860 Munich II	2014–15	Regionalliga Bayern	18	6	—		—		18	6
1860 Munich II	2015–16	Regionalliga Bayern	23	10	—		—		23	10
1860 Munich II	2016–17	Regionalliga Bayern	8	0	—		—		8	0
1860 Munich II	Total	Regionalliga Bayern	94	20	0	0	1	0	95	20
1860 Munich	2015–16	2. Bundesliga	7	0	1	0	—		8	0
1860 Munich	2016–17	2. Bundesliga	5	0	1	0	—		6	0
1860 Munich	2017–18	Regionalliga Bayern	32	14	1	0	2	1	35	15
1860 Munich	2018–19	3. Liga	31	5	1	1	—		32	6
1860 Munich	2019–20	3. Liga	8	0	—		—		8	0
1860 Munich	Total		83	19	4	1	2	1	89	21
Career total			177	39	4	1	3	1	184	41
