= Aaron Berzel =

German footballer

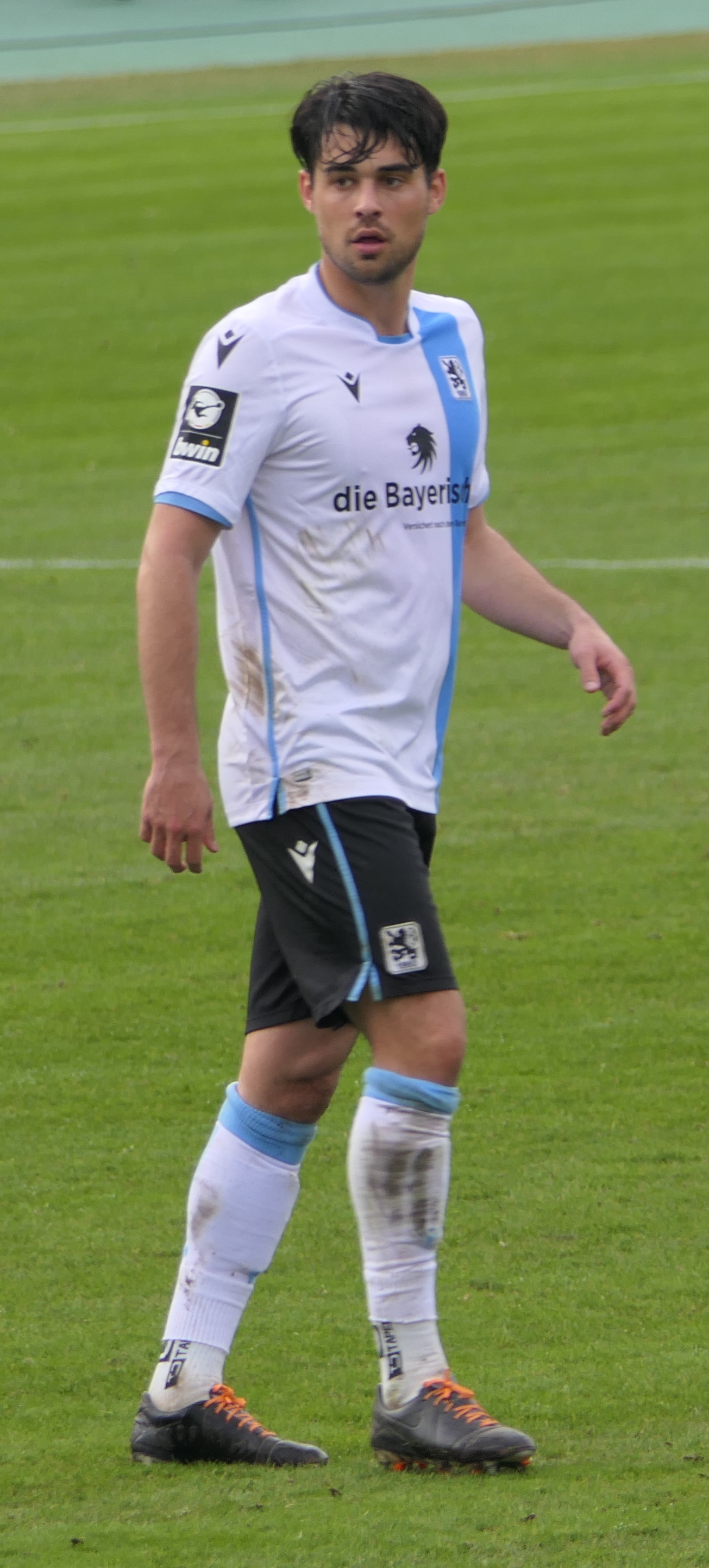
- Berzel in 2020

Personal information
- Date of birth: 29 May 1992 (age 34)
- Place of birth: Heidelberg, Germany
- Height: 1.84 m (6 ft 0 in)
- Position: Right back

Team information
- Current team: Rot-Weiß Oberhausen
- Number: 22

Youth career
- SG Victoria Mauer
- –2009: 1899 Hoffenheim
- 2009–2011: VfL Wolfsburg

Senior career*
Years	Team	Apps	(Gls)
2011–2012	Holstein Kiel	21	(2)
2012–2013	SV Babelsberg 03	25	(1)
2013–2015	Darmstadt 98	30	(1)
2015	Preußen Münster	5	(0)
2015–2017	SV Elversberg	36	(1)
2017–2020	1860 Munich II	3	(0)
2017–2020	1860 Munich	71	(3)
2020–2021	Türkgücü München	26	(0)
2021–2022	Viktoria Köln	9	(0)
2022–2023	SC Verl	15	(1)
2023–	Rot-Weiß Oberhausen	0	(0)
- * Club domestic league appearances and goals as of 12 November 2022

Aaron Berzel (born 29 May 1992) is a German professional footballer who plays as a defender for Rot-Weiß Oberhausen.

== Career ==
Berzel played youth football for later 1899 Hoffenheim and VfL Wolfsburg. At Holstein Kiel he made his breakthrough in senior football. He joined the club in 2011, and made 21 appearances in the Regionalliga Nord in the 2011–12 season, before his former Wolfsburg youth coach, Christian Benbennek, brought him to 3. Liga side SV Babelsberg 03. Babelsberg were relegated in the 2012–13 season, so Berzel left the club, signing for SV Darmstadt 98.

On 18 January 2022, Berzel signed with SC Verl. On 12 January 2023, his contract with SC Verl was terminated by mutual consent.

On 31 January 2023, Berzel signed with Rot-Weiß Oberhausen in Regionalliga West.

== Career statistics ==
=== Club ===
As of match played 21 December 2019

Appearances and goals by club, season and competition
Club	Season	League			DFB-Pokal		Other		Total	
Club	Season	Division	Apps	Goals	Apps	Goals	Apps	Goals	Apps	Goals
Holstein Kiel	2011–12	Regionalliga Nord	21	2	3	0	—		24	2
SV Babelsberg 03	2012–13	3. Liga	25	1	—		—		25	1
Darmstadt 98	2013–14	3. Liga	27	1	1	0	2 (Note: Appearances in the Promotion/relegation play-offs)	0	30	1
Darmstadt 98	2014–15	2. Bundesliga	3	0	1	0	—		4	0
Darmstadt 98	Total		30	1	2	0	2	0	34	1
Preußen Münster	2014–15	3. Liga	5	0	—		—		5	0
SV Elversberg	2015–16	Regionalliga Südwest	26	0	0	0	0	0	26	0
SV Elversberg	2016–17	Regionalliga Südwest	10	1	—		—		10	1
SV Elversberg	Total		36	1	0	0	0	0	36	1
1860 Munich	2017–18	Regionalliga Bayern	29	1	1	0	—		30	1
1860 Munich	2018–19	3. Liga	14	0	0	0	—		14	0
1860 Munich	2019–20	3. Liga	14	1	—		—		14	1
1860 Munich	Total		57	2	1	0	0	0	58	2
Career total			174	7	6	0	2	0	182	7
