= Dennis Dressel =

German footballer

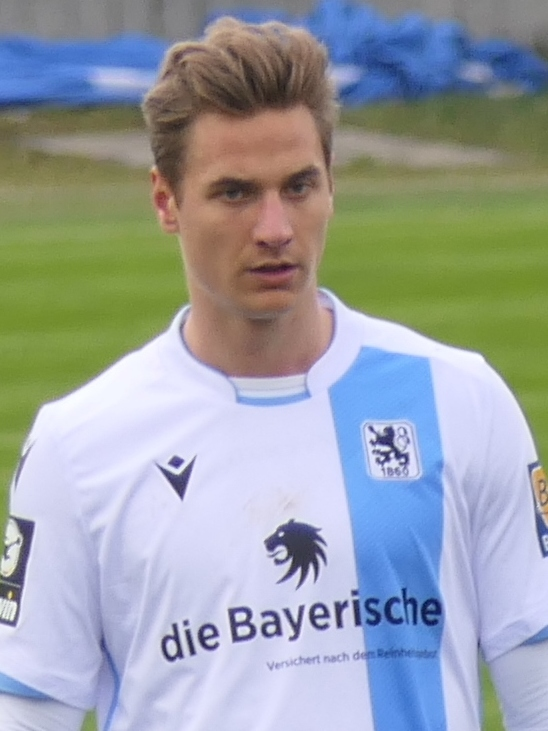
- Dressel in 2020

Personal information
- Date of birth: 26 October 1998 (age 28)
- Place of birth: Dachau, Bavaria, Germany
- Height: 1.86 m (6 ft 1 in)
- Position: Midfielder

Team information
- Current team: 1860 Munich
- Number: 14

Youth career
- –2007: SV Weichs
- 2007–2017: 1860 Munich

Senior career*
Years	Team	Apps	(Gls)
2017–2019	1860 Munich II	48	(11)
2018–2022	1860 Munich	110	(17)
2022–2024	Hansa Rostock	68	(4)
2024–2025	Grazer AK	14	(0)
2025–2026	SSV Ulm	50	(1)
2026–	1860 Munich	10	(0)
- * Club domestic league appearances and goals as of 27 September 2026

Dennis Dressel (born 26 October 1998) is a German professional footballer who plays as a midfielder for 1860 Munich.

== Career ==
Dressel made his senior debut for 1860 Munich in the Regionalliga Bayern on 12 May 2018, starting in the away match against SpVgg Bayreuth in which he scored a goal, with the match finishing as a 4–1 win. He made his debut for the club in the 3. Liga on 8 April 2019, starting in the away match against Sonnenhof Großaspach before being substituted out in the 89th minute for Semi Belkahia, with the match finishing as a 1–0 loss.

In the summer of 2022, Dressel signed a two-year contract with Hansa Rostock.

On 27 July 2024, Dressel moved to Grazer AK in Austria on a two-year deal.

On 22 January 2025, Dressel returned to Germany and signed a one-and-a-half-year contract with 2. Bundesliga club SSV Ulm.
