= Benjamin Kindsvater =

German footballer

Personal information
- Date of birth: 8 February 1993 (age 33)
- Place of birth: Trostberg, Germany
- Height: 1.76 m (5 ft 9 in)
- Position: Left midfielder

Team information
- Current team: VfR Aalen
- Number: 11

Youth career
- TuS Traunreut
- 2008–2011: Wacker Burghausen

Senior career*
Years	Team	Apps	(Gls)
2013–2017	Wacker Burghausen	94	(19)
2017–2020	1860 Munich	64	(6)
2021	Nitra	13	(0)
2021–	VfR Aalen	131	(65)
- * Club domestic league appearances and goals as of 24 September 2026

Benjamin Kindsvater (born 8 February 1993) is a German professional footballer who plays as a left midfielder for VfR Aalen.

== Career statistics ==
As of match played 4 July 2024

Appearances and goals by club, season and competition
Club	Season	League			Cup (Note: Appearances in the DFB-Pokal and Bavarian Cup)		Other		Total	
Club	Season	Division	Apps	Goals	Apps	Goals	Apps	Goals	Apps	Goals
Wacker Burghausen	2012–13	3. Liga	1	0	—		—		1	0
Wacker Burghausen	2013–14	3. Liga	9	0	—		—		9	0
Wacker Burghausen	2014–15	Regionalliga Bayern	29	3	—		—		29	3
Wacker Burghausen	2015–16	Regionalliga Bayern	31	8	—		—		31	8
Wacker Burghausen	2016–17	Regionalliga Bayern	24	7	—		—		24	7
Wacker Burghausen	Total		94	18	—		—		94	18
1860 Munich II	2017–18	Oberliga Bayern Süd	1	0	—		—		1	0
1860 Munich	2017–18	Regionalliga Bayern	29	4	—		2 (Note: Appearances in the Regionalliga playoff)	0	31	4
1860 Munich	2018–19	3. Liga	22	2	1	0	—		23	2
1860 Munich	2019–20	3. Liga	13	0	1	0	—		14	0
1860 Munich	Total		64	6	2	0	2	0	68	6
FC Nitra	2020–21	Slovak Super Liga	13	0	0	0	—		13	0
VfR Aalen	2021–22	Regionalliga Südwest	22	3	—		—		22	3
VfR Aalen	2022–23	Regionalliga Südwest	12	1	—		—		12	1
VfR Aalen	2023–24	Regionalliga Südwest	30	13	—		—		30	13
VfR Aalen	Total		64	17	0	0	0	0	64	17
Career total			236	41	2	0	2	0	240	41
