= Markus Ziereis =

German footballer (born 1992)

Personal information
- Date of birth: 26 August 1992 (age 34)
- Place of birth: Roding, Germany
- Height: 1.85 m (6 ft 1 in)
- Position: Forward

Team information
- Current team: DJK Vilzing
- Number: 11

Youth career
- 1998–2005: SpVgg Neukirchen-Balbini
- 2005–2007: Jahn Regensburg
- 2007–2010: 1860 Munich

Senior career*
Years	Team	Apps	(Gls)
2010–2013	1860 Munich II	70	(26)
2011–2013	1860 Munich	4	(0)
2013–2014	FSV Frankfurt	5	(1)
2014	→ Darmstadt 98 (loan)	6	(0)
2014	Chemnitzer FC	21	(0)
2015–2017	Jahn Regensburg	41	(19)
2017–2020	1860 Munich	48	(15)
2020–2023	SpVgg Bayreuth	75	(32)
2023–2025	VfB Oldenburg	54	(15)
2025–	DJK Vilzing	5	(2)

International career
2007–2008	Germany U16	5	(0)
- * Club domestic league appearances and goals as of 27 September 2026

Markus Ziereis (born 26 August 1992) is a German professional footballer who plays as a forward for Regionalliga Bayern side DJK Vilzing.

== Club career ==
Ziereis began his career with 1860 Munich and made his 2. Bundesliga debut for the club in November 2012, as a half-time substitute for Sebastian Maier in a 2–2 draw with Union Berlin. In 2013, he joined FSV Frankfurt. In order to get more playing time, he was loaned to Darmstadt 98. In 2014, he joined Chemnitzer FC.

After one season, he returned to Jahn Regensburg. During the 2015–16 season he contributed 19 goals in 31 league matches to Regensburg's promotion from the Regionalliga Bayern to the 3. Liga. His following season was blighted by injuries and he lost his place in the starting lineup, making just 10 substitute appearances.

On 10 August 2017, Ziereis returned to 1860 Munich, thereby moving two tiers down, leaving newly promoted 2. Bundesliga club Regensburg to play in the Regionalliga Bayern.

He joined SpVgg Bayreuth in June 2020.

He joined VfB Oldenburg in July 2023. He made his debut in a 4–0 win against Kilia Kiel, where he also scored his first league goal for the club.

== International career ==
In 2007 and 2008, Ziereis earned five caps for the Germany under-16 national team.

== Personal life ==
Ziereis is best friends with Kevin Volland. The duo shared a flat while playing together at 1860 Munich as they both played for Bavarian Football Association youth teams. Volland was also witness when Ziereis married Evi Reiter on 28 December 2018.

== Career statistics ==
=== Club ===
As of match played 21 December 2019

Appearances and goals by club, season and competition
Club	Season	League			DFB-Pokal		Total	
Club	Season	Division	Apps	Goals	Apps	Goals	Apps	Goals
1860 Munich II	2010–11	Regionalliga Süd	10	0	—		10	0
1860 Munich II	2011–12	Regionalliga Süd	27	4	—		27	4
1860 Munich II	2012–13	Regionalliga Bayern	35	22	—		35	22
1860 Munich II	Total		72	26	0	0	72	26
1860 Munich	2012–13	2. Bundesliga	4	0	0	0	4	0
FSV Frankfurt	2013–14	2. Bundesliga	5	1	0	0	5	1
Darmstadt 98 (loan)	2013–14	3. Liga	6	0	0	0	6	0
Chemnitzer FC	2014–15	3. Liga	21	0	1	1	22	1
Jahn Regensburg	2015–16	Regionalliga Bayern	33	19	—		33	19
Jahn Regensburg	2016–17	3. Liga	10	0	0	0	10	0
Jahn Regensburg	Total		43	19	0	0	43	19
1860 Munich	2017–18	Regionalliga Bayern	29	14	1	0	30	14
1860 Munich	2018–19	3. Liga	10	0	1	0	11	0
1860 Munich	2019–20	3. Liga	11	1	—		11	1
1860 Munich	Total		50	15	2	0	52	15
Career total			201	61	3	1	204	62

== Honours ==
SpVgg Bayreuth

- Regionalliga Bayern: 2021–22
