= 2018–19 TSV 1860 Munich season =

1860 Munich
2018–19 season
- Chairman: Hasan Ismaik
- Head Coach: Daniel Bierofka
- Stadium: Allianz Arena
- 3. Liga: 12th
- DFB-Pokal: First Round
- Bavarian Cup: Quarter-Final
- Top goalscorer: League: Sascha Mölders (8); All: Sascha Mölders (8)
- Highest home attendance: 15,000 (in 18 matches)
- Lowest home attendance: 14,100 vs VfR Aalen (18 February 2019)
- Average home league attendance: 14,953 (11 May 2019)
Home colours	Away colours	Third colours

The 2018–19 TSV 1860 Munich season was the club's 1st season in the 3. Liga following their promotion from the Regionalliga Bayern at the end of the previous season.

== Season events ==
On 11 June, 1860 announced the signing of Adriano Grimaldi from Preußen Münster.

On 18 June, 1860 announced the signing of Stefan Lex from Ingolstadt 04, and the signing of Efkan Bekiroğlu from Augsburg II.

On 19 June, 1860 announced the signing of Semi Belkahia from VfR Garching.

On 20 June, 1860 announced the signing of Quirin Moll from Eintracht Braunschweig.

On 4 July, 1860 announced that they had extended their contract with Christian Köppel, Eric Weeger, Simon Seferings, Johann Hipper, Phillipp Steinhart and Daniel Wein, whilst Marco Hiller's contract was also extended after a clause in it was triggered.

On 9 July, 1860 announced the signing of Simon Lorenz on loan from VfL Bochum for the 2018–19 season.

On 31 August, 1860 announced the signing of Romuald Lacazette on loan from Darmstadt 98 for the 2018–19 season.

On 22 January, 1860 announced that Adriano Grimaldi was leaving the club to sign for Uerdingen 05.

On 26 January, 1860 announced the signing of Prince Owusu on loan from Arminia Bielefeld until the end of the season.

On 31 January, 1860 announced that Simon Seferings had joined VfR Garching on loan for the remainder of the season, whilst Nicholas Helmbrecht had terminated his contract with the club and had joined FC Memmingen.

On 14 May, 1860 announced that Alessandro Abruscia would be leaving the club when his contract expired on 30 June 2019.

== Squad ==
As of match played 18 May 2019

No.	Name	Nationality	Position	Date of birth (age)	Signed from	Signed in	Contract ends	Apps.	Goals
Goalkeepers
1	Marco Hiller	(Germany)	GK	20 February 1997 (aged 22)	Academy	2015		73	0
38	Hendrik Bonmann	(Germany)	GK	22 January 1994 (aged 25)	Borussia Dortmund	2017	2020	10	0
40	Tom Kretzschmar	(Germany)	GK	19 January 1999 (aged 20)	Academy	2018		0	0
Defenders
2	Eric Weeger	(Germany)	DF	2 February 1997 (aged 22)	Academy	2017		48	3
4	Felix Weber	(Germany)	DF	18 January 1995 (aged 24)	Academy	2016		69	5
6	Jan Mauersberger	(Germany)	DF	17 June 1985 (aged 33)	Karlsruher SC	2016		85	7
11	Christian Köppel	(Germany)	DF	3 November 1994 (aged 24)	Academy	2017		43	4
17	Daniel Wein	(Germany)	DF	5 February 1994 (aged 25)	Wehen Wiesbaden	2017		75	6
22	Aaron Berzel	(Germany)	DF	29 May 1992 (aged 26)	SV Elversberg	2017		49	1
27	Semi Belkahia	(Germany)	DF	22 December 1998 (aged 20)	VfR Garching	2018		6	0
28	Herbert Paul	(Germany)	DF	11 February 1994 (aged 25)	FC Schweinfurt 05	2018		36	4
32	Simon Lorenz	(Germany)	DF	30 March 1997 (aged 22)	on loan from VfL Bochum	2018	2019	40	4
36	Phillipp Steinhart	(Germany)	DF	7 July 1992 (aged 26)	Sportfreunde Lotte	2017	2019	70	6
44	Leon Klassen	(Russia)	DF	29 May 2000 (aged 18)	Academy	2016		2	0
Midfielders
5	Quirin Moll	(Germany)	MF	21 January 1991 (aged 28)	Eintracht Braunschweig	2018		22	1
14	Dennis Dressel	(Germany)	MF	26 October 1998 (aged 20)	Academy	2017		6	1
16	Benjamin Kindsvater	(Germany)	MF	8 February 1993 (aged 26)	Wacker Burghausen	2017		56	6
19	Alessandro Abruscia	(Germany)	MF	12 July 1990 (aged 28)	Stuttgarter Kickers	2018		16	2
20	Efkan Bekiroğlu	(Germany)	MF	14 September 1995 (aged 23)	Augsburg II	2018		33	5
21	Uğur Mustafa Türk	(Turkey)	MF	24 June 1997 (aged 21)	Academy	2017		16	0
25	Marius Willsch	(Germany)	MF	18 March 1991 (aged 28)	FC Schweinfurt 05	2018		22	0
31	Kodjovi Koussou	(Togo)	MF	22 June 1992 (aged 26)	Bayern Munich II	2016		39	1
34	Kristian Böhnlein	(Germany)	MF	10 May 1990 (aged 29)	SpVgg Bayreuth	2018		8	0
35	Noel Niemann	(Germany)	MF	14 November 1999 (aged 19)	Academy	2018		0	0
38	Romuald Lacazette	(France)	MF	3 January 1994 (aged 25)	on loan from Darmstadt 98	2018	2019	49	1
Forwards
7	Stefan Lex	(Germany)	FW	27 November 1989 (aged 29)	Ingolstadt 04	2018		37	5
9	Sascha Mölders	(Germany)	FW	20 March 1985 (aged 34)	Augsburg	2016		111	39
13	Prince Owusu	(Germany)	FW	7 January 1997 (aged 22)	on loan from Arminia Bielefeld	2019	2019	16	3
18	Nico Karger	(Germany)	FW	1 February 1993 (aged 26)	Academy	2015		90	26
24	Markus Ziereis	(Germany)	FW	26 August 1992 (aged 26)	Jahn Regensburg	2017	2020	50	20
Out on loan
8	Simon Seferings	(Germany)	MF	5 July 1995 (aged 23)	SV Heimstetten	2015		15	3
29	György Hursán	(Hungary)	MF	5 February 1997 (aged 22)	Academy	2017		6	0
Left during the season
10	Adriano Grimaldi	(Germany)	FW	5 April 1991 (aged 28)	Preußen Münster	2017		22	5
23	Nicholas Helmbrecht	(Germany)	FW	30 January 1995 (aged 24)	1860 Rosenheim	2015		23	2

== Transfers ==
=== In ===
Date	Position	Nationality	Name	From	Fee	Ref.
11 June 2018	FW	(Germany)	Adriano Grimaldi	Preußen Münster	Undisclosed	
18 June 2018	DF	(Germany)	Efkan Bekiroğlu	Augsburg II	Undisclosed	
18 June 2018	FW	(Germany)	Stefan Lex	Ingolstadt 04	Undisclosed	
19 June 2018	DF	(Germany)	Semi Belkahia	VfR Garching	Undisclosed	
20 June 2018	MF	(Germany)	Quirin Moll	Eintracht Braunschweig	Undisclosed	

=== Loans in ===
Start date	Position	Nationality	Name	From	End date	Ref.
9 July 2018	DF	(Germany)	Simon Lorenz	VfL Bochum	30 June 2019	
31 August 2018	MF	(France)	Romuald Lacazette	Darmstadt 98	30 June 2019	
26 January 2019	FW	(Germany)	Prince Owusu	Arminia Bielefeld	30 June 2019	

=== Out ===
Date	Position	Nationality	Name	To	Fee	Ref.
22 January 2019	FW	(Germany)	Adriano Grimaldi	Uerdingen 05	Undisclosed	

=== Loans out ===
Start date	Position	Nationality	Name	To	End date	Ref.
31 January 2019	MF	(Germany)	Simon Seferings	VfR Garching	30 June 2019	

=== Released ===
Date	Position	Nationality	Name	Joined	Date	Ref
31 January 2019	FW	(Germany)	Nicholas Helmbrecht	FC Memmingen	31 January 2019	
30 June 2019	MF	(Germany)	Alessandro Abruscia	SSV Ulm		

== Friendlies ==
20 June 2018	BSC Sendling	1–10	1860 Munich	Westpark
18:60 CEST (UTC+2)	Candussi 20'	Report	Bekiroğlu 9'; Paul 12'; Ziereis 54', 59', 67' (pen.); Grimaldi 61', 84'; Köppel 65'; Lex 76', 85'	Stadium: Siegenburger Straße sports complex Attendance: 1,000; Referee: Julian Kreye

23 June 2018	Eintracht Freising	2–3	1860 Munich	Freising
15:00 CEST (UTC+2)	Schön 16', 37'	Report	Karger 51'; Mölders 75' (pen.), 90+1'	Stadium: Stadion Savoyer Au; Attendance: 2,000; Referee: Wolfgang Haselberger

27 June 2018	TSV 1880 Wasserburg	1–4	1860 Munich	Wasserburg am Inn
18:30 CEST (UTC+2)	Scheitzeneder 53'	Report	Bekiroğlu 37'; Mölders 38', 41'; Ziereis 78'	Stadium: Badria Stadion; Attendance: 2,860; Referee: Matthias Zacher

30 June 2018	Basel	1–1	1860 Munich	Geretsried
17:00 CEST (UTC+2)	Petretta 2'; Pululu (yellow card); Stabile (yellow card)	Report	Mölders 10'; Paul (yellow card)	Stadium: Isaraustadion; Attendance: 1,860; Referee: Christian Dietz

5 July 2018	FC Dingolfing	0–5	1860 Munich	Dingolfing
18:00 CEST (UTC+2)	Abraham (yellow card)	Report	Grimaldi 11'; Köppel 49'; Dressel 60'; Ziereis 64'; Abruscia 71'	Stadium: Isar-Wald-Stadion; Attendance: 2,500; Referee: Tobias Wittmann

8 July 2018	VfB Eichstätt	0–2	1830 Munich	Bodenmais
14:00 CEST (UTC+2)		Report	Weber 3', 38'; Seferings (yellow card)	Stadium: Glück-Auf-Stadion; Attendance: 1,860; Referee: Michael Freund

12 July 2018	1860 Munich	1–0	Ufa	Angerberg, Austria
18:00 CEST (UTC+2)	Abruscia 81'; Mölders (yellow card)	Report	Paurević (yellow card); Oblyakov (yellow card); Krugovoy (yellow card)	Stadium: Sportzentrum; Attendance: 400; Referee: Engin Isgören

14 July 2018	1860 Munich	0–0	İstanbul Başakşehir	Kössen
18:00 CEST (UTC+2)		Report		Stadium: Kaiserwinkel Arena; Attendance: 860; Referee: Andreas Heiss

20 July 2018	1860 Munich	2–1	SV Sandhausen	Ottobeuren
18:30 CEST (UTC+2)	Grimaldi 45'; Paul 52'	Report	Zenga 14'; Guédé (yellow card)	Stadium: Galgenberg Stadium; Attendance: 800; Referee: Tobias Schultes

21 July 2018	VfR Garching	1–5	1860 Munich	Garching
17:00 CEST (UTC+2)	Niebauer 10'	Report	Bekiroğlu 12', 25', 56'; Ziereis 24'; Abruscia 30'	Stadium: Stadion am See; Attendance: 1,200; Referee: Florian Böhm

16 November 2018	Ingolstadt 04	1–2	1860 Munich	Kirchheim bei München
15:30 CET (UTC+1)	Lezcano 69'	Report	Karger 15'; Belkahia 26'	Stadium: ATS Sportpark Heimstetten; Attendance: 300; Referee: Wolfgang Haslberger

9 January 2019	1860 Munich	2–2	SV Ried	Munich
14:00 CET (UTC+1)	Steinhart 25'; Weeger 84'	Report	Pecirep 2'; Wießmeier 17'	Stadium: Grünwalder Straße Training Ground; Attendance: 100

14 January 2019	Darmstadt 98	1–0	1860 Munich	Darmstadt
15:30 CET (UTC+1)	Platte 21'	Report		Stadium: Merck-Stadion am Böllenfalltor

17 January 2019	Arminia Bielefeld	2–1	1860 Munich	Bielefeld
15:30 CET (UTC+1)	Nöthe 8'; Klos 54'	Report	Steinhart 35'	Stadium: Bielefelder Alm

13 February 2019	1860 Munich	1–0	SSV Ulm 1846	Munich
14:00 CET (UTC+1)	Abruscia 24'	Report		Stadium: Grünwalder Straße Training Ground; Attendance: 186

== Competitions ==
=== Overall record ===
Competition	First match	Last match	Starting round	Final position	Record							
Competition	First match	Last match	Starting round	Final position	Pld	W	D	L	GF	GA	GD	Win %
3. Liga	28 July 2018	18 May 2019	Matchday 1	12th	38	12	11	15	48	52	−4	31.58
DFB-Pokal	19 August 2018	19 August 2018	First Round	First Round	1	0	0	1	1	3	−2	0.00
Bavarian Cup	15 August 2018	30 April 2019	First Round	Semi-final	4	3	0	1	10	4	+6	75.00
Total					43	15	11	17	59	59	+0	34.88

Last updated: 18 May 2019
Source: Competitions

=== 3. Liga ===
==== League table ====
Pos	Team	Pld	W	D	L	GF	GA	GD	Pts
10	SpVgg Unterhaching	38	11	15	12	53	46	+7	48
11	KFC Uerdingen	38	14	6	18	47	62	−15	48
12	1860 Munich	38	12	11	15	48	52	−4	47
13	SV Meppen	38	13	8	17	48	53	−5	47
14	Carl Zeiss Jena	38	11	13	14	48	57	−9	46

Source: DFB
Rules for classification: 1) Points; 2) Goal difference; 3) Goals scored; 4) Head-to-head results; 5) Head-to-head away goals scored; 6) Away goals scored; 7) Play-off.

==== Results summary ====
Overall								Home						Away					
Pld	W	D	L	GF	GA	GD	Pts	W	D	L	GF	GA	GD	W	D	L	GF	GA	GD
0	0	0	0	0	0	0	0	0	0	0	0	0	0	0	0	0	0	0	0

Last updated: 18 May 2019.

==== Results by round ====
Round	1	2	3	4	5	6	7	8	9	10	11	12	13	14	15	16	17	18	19	20	21	22	23	24	25	26	27	28	29	30	31	32	33	34	35	36	37	38
Ground	A	H	A	H	A	H	A	H	A	H	A	H	H	A	H	A	H	A	H	H	A	H	A	H	A	H	A	H	A	H	A	A	H	A	H	A	H	A
Result	L	W	D	L	W	W	D	L	D	D	L	W	D	D	D	L	W	D	L	W	D	L	D	W	W	L	W	W	L	W	D	L	L	L	L	L	W	L
Position	16	7	10	12	9	4	5	8	9	8	12	12	11	10	10	11	9	9	12	9	9	10	12	11	9	12	9	5	9	5	6	6	9	10	12	12	11	12
Points	0	3	4	4	7	10	11	11	12	13	13	16	17	18	19	19	22	23	23	26	27	27	28	31	34	34	37	40	40	43	44	44	44	44	44	44	47	47

Updated to match(es) played on 18 May 2019. Source:
A = Away; H = Home; W = Win; D = Draw; L = Loss

==== Results ====
28 July 2018 1	FC Kaiserslautern	1–0	1860 Munich	Kaiserslautern
14:00 CEST (UTC+2)	Sternberg 86'	Report	Willsch (yellow card) 49'; Steinhart (yellow card) 59'	Stadium: Fritz-Walter-Stadion; Attendance: 41,324; Referee: Harm Osmers

4 August 2018 2	1860 Munich	5–1	Sportfreunde Lotte	Munich
14:00 CEST (UTC+2)	Lorenz 13'; Grimaldi 22'; Mölders 51'; Weber 65'; Lex 89'	Report	Karweina 81' (yellow card) 87'	Stadium: Grünwalder Stadion; Attendance: 15,000; Referee: Christian Dingert

8 August 2018 3	VfL Osnabrück	2–2	1860 Munich	Osnabrück
19:00 CEST (UTC+2)	Farrona-Pulido 77'; Schiller (red card) 81'; Álvarez (yellow card) 90' (goal) 90+4'	Report	Grimaldi 35'; Lorenz 47'; Bekiroğlu (yellow card) 59'; Willsch (yellow card) 72'; Steinhart (yellow card) 78'; Moll (yellow card) 90'	Stadium: Stadion an der Bremer Brücke; Attendance: 13,616; Referee: Patrick Ittrich

12 August 2018 4	1860 Munich	0–1	Uerdingen 05	Munich
13:00 CEST (UTC+2)	Wein (yellow card) 58'	Report	Öztürk (yellow card) 35'; Schorch (yellow card) 46'; Großkreutz (yellow card) 83'; Ibrahimaj 90+2'	Stadium: Grünwalder Stadion; Attendance: 15,000; Referee: Felix Zwayer

25 August 2018 5	VfR Aalen	1–4	1860 Munich	Aalen
14:00 CEST (UTC+2)	Sarr (yellow card) 30' (yellow-red card) 84'; Ristl 77'; Morys (yellow card) 78'	Report	Karger 19'; Abruscia 39', 54'; Weber (yellow card) 59'; Moll (yellow card) 77'; Paul (yellow card) 78'; Bekiroğlu 86'	Stadium: Städtisches Waldstadion; Attendance: 8,260; Referee: Franz Bokop

31 August 2018 6	1860 Munich	2–0	Energie Cottbus	Munich
19:00 CEST (UTC+2)	Lorenz (yellow card) 30'; Stanese 33'; Grimaldi (yellow card) 45'; Willsch (yellow card) 57'; Karger 59'	Report	Viteritti (yellow card) 4'; Matuwila (yellow card) 32'; Stein (yellow card) 45'; Mamba (yellow card) 72'	Stadium: Grünwalder Stadion; Attendance: 15,000; Referee: Daniel Schlager

15 September 2018 7	Hansa Rostock	2–2	1860 Munich	Rostock
14:00 CEST (UTC+2)	Königs 48'; Breier 50'; Riedel (yellow card) 73'	Report	Paul 31'; Steinhart 75' (pen.); Weber (yellow card) 87'	Stadium: Ostseestadion; Attendance: 18,000; Referee: Daniel Siebert

22 September 2018 8	1860 Munich	1–2	Wehen Wiesbaden	Munich
14:00 CEST (UTC+2)	Paul 37'; Steinhart (yellow card) 55'	Report	Shipnoski 56', 62'; Mintzel (yellow card) 77'; Andrist (yellow card) 80'	Stadium: Grünwalder Stadion; Attendance: 15,000; Referee: Martin Petersen

26 September 2018 9	SpVgg Unterhaching	1–1	1860 Munich	Unterhaching
19:00 CEST (UTC+2)	Hufnagel (yellow card) 24'; Endres (yellow card) 26'; Marseiler (yellow card) 42'; Greger (yellow card) 46'; Widemann (yellow card) 90'; Schimmer 90+1'	Report	Grimaldi 55' (yellow card) 90'; Moll (yellow card) 77'; Weber (yellow card) 80'; Wein (yellow card) 90'	Stadium: Sportpark Unterhaching; Attendance: 14,200; Referee: Robert Kampka

1 October 2018 10	1860 Munich	1–1	Würzburger Kickers	Munich
19:00 CEST (UTC+2)	Steinhart (yellow card) 38'; Grimaldi 64' (yellow card) 84'	Report	Gnaase (yellow card) 31' (yellow-red card) 57'; Göbel (yellow card) 70'; Skarlatidis 82'	Stadium: Grünwalder Stadion; Attendance: 15,000; Referee: Eric Müller

7 October 2018 11	SV Meppen	1–0	1860 Munich	Meppen
13:00 CEST (UTC+2)	Undav (yellow card) 37'; Amin 41'; Jesgarzewski (yellow card) 72'; Kleinsorge (yellow card) 90+2'	Report	Moll (yellow card) 57'; Grimaldi (yellow card) 78'; Köppel (yellow card) 90'	Stadium: Hänsch-Arena; Attendance: 9,200; Referee: Katrin Rafalski

20 October 2018 12	1860 Munich	2–0	Eintracht Braunschweig	Munich
14:00 CEST (UTC+2)	Bekiroğlu 51' (yellow card) 74'; Grimaldi (yellow card) 61'; Kindsvater 90+3'	Report	Hofmann (yellow card) 21'; Otto (yellow card) 32'; Amundsen (yellow card) 66'	Stadium: Grünwalder Stadion; Attendance: 15,000; Referee: Jonas Weickenmeier

28 October 2018 13	1860 Munich	2–2	Sonnenhof Großaspach	Munich
13:00 CET (UTC+1)	Mölders 7', 82'; Lacazette (yellow card) 39'; Böhnlein (yellow card) 68'	Report	Pelivan 25' (yellow card) 28'; Baku 69'; Choroba (yellow card) 87'	Stadium: Grünwalder Stadion; Attendance: 15,000; Referee: Bastian Börner

3 November 2018 14	Preußen Münster	0–0	1860 Munich	Münster
14:00 CET (UTC+1)	Rodrigues-Pires (yellow card) 71'	Report	Lacazette (yellow card) 10'	Stadium: Preußenstadion; Attendance: 12,532; Referee: Florian Lechner

10 November 2018 15	1860 Munich	1–1	Hallescher	Munich
14:00 CET (UTC+1)	Lorenz (yellow card) 27'; Steinhart 66' (pen.); Kindsvater (yellow card) 73'; Willsch (yellow card) 77'	Report	Lindenhahn (red card) 22'; Bahn 41' (pen.) (yellow card) 86'; Schilk (yellow card) 55'; Eisele (yellow card) 64'; Landgraf (yellow card) 64'; Washausen (yellow card) 81'	Stadium: Grünwalder Stadion; Attendance: 15,000; Referee: Justus Zorn

25 November 2018 16	Karlsruher SC	3–2	1860 Munich	Karlsruhe
13:00 CET (UTC+1)	Fink 4'; Pourié 30'; Pisot 35'; Stiefler (yellow card) 50'	Report	Lorenz 29'; Weber (yellow card) 42'; Mölders (yellow card) 77'; Grimaldi 90+1'	Stadium: Wildparkstadion; Attendance: 16,477; Referee: Harm Osmers

1 December 2018 17	1860 Munich	2–0	FSV Zwickau	Munich
14:00 CET (UTC+1)	Lex 16'; Steinhart 31' (pen.)	Report	Kartalis (yellow card) 43'; Sorge (yellow card) 90+1'	Stadium: Grünwalder Stadion; Attendance: 15,000; Referee: Martin Petersen

8 December 2018 18	Fortuna Köln	0–0	1860 Munich	Cologne
14:00 CET (UTC+1)	Kegel (yellow card) 32' (yellow-red card) 54'; Ruprecht (yellow card) 40'; Ernst (yellow card) 63'	Report	Steinhart (yellow card) 57'	Stadium: Südstadion; Attendance: 6,560; Referee: Henrik Bramlage

16 December 2018 19	1860 Munich	1–3	Carl Zeiss Jena	Munich
13:00 CET (UTC+1)	Berzel (yellow card) 6'; Paul (yellow card) 19' (yellow-red card) 32'; Wein (yellow card) 45'; Karger 62'	Report	Wolfram 3'; Cros (yellow card) 54'; Slamar (yellow card) 63'; Koczor (yellow card) 64'; Günther-Schmidt 74', 81'	Stadium: Grünwalder Stadion; Attendance: 15,000; Referee: Tobias Fritsch

22 December 2018 20	1860 Munich	2–1	FC Kaiserslautern	Munich
14:00 CET (UTC+1)	Bekiroğlu 55'; Berzel (yellow card) 60'; Moll 85'	Report	Sternberg (yellow card) 18' (yellow-red card) 45'; Kühlwetter (yellow card) 64'; Thiele 68'	Stadium: Grünwalder Stadion; Attendance: 15,000; Referee: Martin Thomsen

25 January 2019 21	Sportfreunde Lotte	1–1	1860 Munich	Lotte
19:00 CET (UTC+1)	Langlitz (yellow card) 40'; Al-Hazaimeh (yellow card) 49'; Chato 50'; Straith (yellow card) 81'; Wegkamp (yellow card) 90'	Report	Karger 6'; Weeger (yellow card) 29'	Stadium: Stadion am Lotter Kreuz; Attendance: 2,149; Referee: Riem Hussein

2 February 2019 22	1860 Munich	1–2	VfL Osnabrück	Munich
14:00 CET (UTC+1)	Lex (yellow card) 9'; Bekiroğlu (yellow card) 44'; Berzel (red card) 57'; Owusu (yellow card) 59'; Mölders 61'	Report	Girth 7', 80'; Ouahim (yellow card) 18'; Pfeiffer (yellow card) 86'	Stadium: Grünwalder Stadion; Attendance: 15,000; Referee: Patrick Alt

9 February 2019 23	Uerdingen 05	1–1	1860 Munich	Duisburg
14:00 CET (UTC+1)	Maroh (yellow card) 18'; Matuszczyk (yellow card) 29'; Rodríguez 50'; Erb (yellow card) 81'	Report	Wein (yellow card) 28'; Paul (yellow card) 39' (yellow-red card) 64'; Weber 54'	Stadium: MSV-Arena; Attendance: 5,650; Referee: Benedikt Kempkes

18 February 2019 24	1860 Munich	2–1	VfR Aalen	Munich
19:00 CET (UTC+1)	Wein (yellow card) 76' (goal) 84'; Mölders (yellow card) 79'; Owusu 88' (yellow card) 89'	Report	Schnellbacher 48'	Stadium: Grünwalder Stadion; Attendance: 14,100; Referee: Tim Skorczyk

23 February 2019 25	Energie Cottbus	1–2	1860 Munich	Cottbus
14:00 CET (UTC+1)	Bohl (yellow card) 31'; Geisler 90+1'	Report	Lorenz (yellow card) 20'; Lex 63'; Owusu (yellow card) 72' (goal) 86'; Karger (yellow card) 87'	Stadium: Stadion der Freundschaft; Attendance: 10,209; Referee: Arne Aarnink

3 March 2019 26	1860 Munich	1–2	Hansa Rostock	Munich
13:00 CET (UTC+1)	Mölders 72'; Paul (yellow card) 77'; Wein (yellow card) 84'	Report	Breier 4'; Scherff (yellow card) 13'; Wannenwetsch (yellow card) 21'; Soukou 42'; Riedel (yellow card) 78'; Gelios (yellow card) 90+2'	Stadium: Grünwalder Stadion; Attendance: 15,000; Referee: Tobias Reichel

9 March 2019 27	Wehen Wiesbaden	0–1	1860 Munich	Wiesbaden
14:00 CET (UTC+1)		Report	Mölders 85'	Stadium: Brita-Arena; Attendance: 6,166; Referee: Manuel Gräfe

12 March 2019 28	1860 Munich	1–0	SpVgg Unterhaching	Munich
19:00 CET (UTC+1)	Karger 45'; Owusu (yellow card) 65'; Berzel (yellow card) 84'	Report	Endres (yellow card) 70'; Schwabl (yellow card) 73'; Winkler (yellow card) 90' (yellow-red card) 90'	Stadium: Grünwalder Stadion; Attendance: 15,000; Referee: Christof Günsch

16 March 2019 29	Würzburger Kickers	2–1	1860 Munich	Würzburg
14:00 CET (UTC+1)	Ademi 20'; Elva 27'; Sontheimer (yellow card) 52'; Kurzweg (yellow card) 73'	Report	Lex 31'; Berzel (yellow card) 58'	Stadium: Akon Arena; Attendance: 10,006; Referee: Florian Lechner

23 March 2019 30	1860 Munich	1–0	SV Meppen	Munich
14:00 CET (UTC+1)	Steinhart 32' (pen.); Lex (yellow card) 67'; Mölders (yellow card) 85'; Ziereis (yellow card) 87'	Report	Puttkammer (yellow card) 9'; Vržogić (yellow card) 32'; Leugers (yellow card) 51'; Komenda (yellow card) 90+3'	Stadium: Grünwalder Stadion; Attendance: 15,000; Referee: Jonas Weickenmeier

30 March 2019 31	Eintracht Braunschweig	1–1	1860 Munich	Braunschweig
14:00 CET (UTC+1)	Kijewski (yellow card) 67'; Otto (yellow card) 85'; Düker 90+1'	Report	Owusu (yellow card) 53'; Steinhart 68'; Hiller (yellow card) 74'; Mölders (yellow card) 76'; Koussou (yellow card) 90+2'	Stadium: Eintracht-Stadion; Attendance: 21,235; Referee: Eric Müller

8 April 2019 32	Sonnenhof Großaspach	1–0	1860 Munich	Aspach
19:00 CEST (UTC+2)	Brünker (yellow card) 41' (goal) 88'; Hercher (yellow card) 58'; Choroba (yellow card) 84'	Report	Wein (yellow card) 79'; Paul (yellow card) 87'	Stadium: WIRmachenDRUCK Arena; Attendance: 8,253; Referee: Justus Zorn

13 April 2019 33	1860 Munich	0–1	Preußen Münster	Munich
14:00 CEST (UTC+2)	Mölders (yellow card) 47'	Report	Dadashov 30' (yellow card) 77'; Klingenburg (yellow card) 62'; Kittner (yellow card) 66'; Menig (yellow card) 90'	Stadium: Grünwalder Stadion; Attendance: 15,000; Referee: Guido Winkmann

20 April 2019 34	Hallescher	3–0	1860 Munich	Halle
14:00 CEST (UTC+2)	Pagliuca 18'; Mai 59'; Ajani 65'	Report	Belkahia (yellow card) 36'; Böhnlein (yellow card) 50'; Weber (yellow card) 63'	Stadium: Leuna-Chemie-Stadion; Attendance: 10,890; Referee: Sören Storks

27 April 2019 35	1860 Munich	0–2	Karlsruher SC	Munich
13:15 CEST (UTC+2)	Karger (yellow card) 8'; Belkahia (yellow card) 52'; Paul (yellow card) 66' (yellow-red card) 84'; Mölders (yellow card) 80'; Kindsvater (yellow card) 90'	Report	Pisot 3'; Thiede (yellow card) 31'; Çamoğlu (yellow card) 71'; Lorenz (yellow card) 90'; Wanitzek 90+3'	Stadium: Grünwalder Stadion; Attendance: 15,000; Referee: Bibiana Steinhaus

4 May 2019 36	FSV Zwickau	5–2	1860 Munich	Zwickau
14:00 CEST (UTC+2)	König 2'; Frick (yellow card) 8' (goal) 49', 58'; Wachsmuth 33' (pen.) (yellow card) 63'; Lauberbach 78'	Report	Wein 10'; Kindsvater (yellow card) 23'; Lacazette (yellow card) 28'; Weber (yellow card) 43' (yellow-red card) 90'; Mölders 56' (yellow card) 88'; Owusu (yellow card) 85'	Stadium: Stadion Zwickau; Attendance: 7,723; Referee: Riem Hussein

11 May 2019 37	1860 Munich	3–2	Fortuna Köln	Munich
13:30 CEST (UTC+2)	Kindsvater 18'; Mölders 45+1'; Wein (yellow card) 59'; Owusu 85'; Lorenz (yellow card) 90+4'	Report	Scheu (yellow card) 20'; Bröker 24'; Fritz 27' (pen.) (yellow card) 50'; Kyere (yellow card) 44' (yellow-red card) 46'; Hartmann (yellow card) 84'; Schiek (yellow card) 89'	Stadium: Grünwalder Stadion; Attendance: 15,000; Referee: Oliver Lossius

18 May 2019 38	Carl Zeiss Jena	4–0	1860 Munich	Jena
13:30 CEST (UTC+2)	Böhnlein 10' (o.g.); Brügmann 17'; Wolfram (yellow card) 27' (goal) 67', 68'; Schüler (yellow card) 57'	Report	Weeger (yellow card) 52'	Stadium: Ernst-Abbe-Sportfeld; Attendance: 10,600; Referee: Johann Pfeifer

=== DFB-Pokal ===
19 August 2018 First round	1860 Munich	1–3	Holstein Kiel	Munich
18:30 CEST (UTC+2)	Karger 7'	Report	Mühling 74', 83'; Schindler 87'	Stadium: Grünwalder Stadion; Attendance: 14,200; Referee: Sascha Stegemann

=== Bavarian Cup ===
15 August 2018 First round	SV Dornach	1–5	1860 Munich	Munich
18:30 CEST (UTC+2)	Mrowczynski 64'; Wagatha (yellow card)	Report	Ziereis 36', 41', 57', 73'; Bekiroğlu 42'	Stadium: Sportpark Heimstetten; Attendance: 1,700; Referee: Christian Dietz

4 September 2018 Round of 16	Memmingen	0–1	1860 Munich	Memmingen
18:30 CEST (UTC+2)	Lutz (yellow card); Heger (yellow card)	Report	Paul 90'; Bekiroğlu (yellow card); Seferings (yellow card); Mauersberger (yellow card)	Stadium: Arena Memmingen; Attendance: 3,559; Referee: Tobias Schultes

10 October 2018 Quarter-final	TSV Buchbach	0–2	1860 Munich	Buchbach
19:30 CEST (UTC+2)	Hain (yellow card); Drum (yellow card)	Report	Lorenz 8' (yellow card); Lex 69'; Berzel (yellow card); Lacazette (yellow card)	Stadium: SMR Arena; Attendance: 2,700; Referee: Christian Dietz

30 April 2019 Semi-final	Viktoria Aschaffenburg	3–2	1860 Munich	Aschaffenburg
19:30 CEST (UTC+2)	Oppermann 12'; Schmidt 19'; Schnitzer 82' (pen.); Verkaj (yellow card); Kizilyar (yellow card)	Report	Bekiroğlu 36'; Paul 43'; Ziereis (yellow card); Steinhart (yellow card)	Stadium: Stadion am Schönbusch; Attendance: 5,850; Referee: Steffen Brütting

== Squad statistics ==
As of match played 18 May 2019

=== Appearances and goals ===
Players with no appearances are not included on the list
Italics indicate a loaned in player

No.	Pos	Nat	Player	Total		3. Liga		DFB-Pokal		Bavarian Cup	
No.	Pos	Nat	Player	Apps	Goals	Apps	Goals	Apps	Goals	Apps	Goals
1	GK	(Germany) GER	Marco Hiller	38	0	32+1	0	1	0	4	0
2	DF	(Germany) GER	Eric Weeger	14	0	8+3	0	0	0	3	0
4	DF	(Germany) GER	Felix Weber	35	2	29+3	2	1	0	2	0
5	MF	(Germany) GER	Quirin Moll	22	1	21	1	1	0	0	0
6	DF	(Germany) GER	Jan Mauersberger	15	0	7+5	0	0	0	3	0
7	FW	(Germany) GER	Stefan Lex	37	5	21+12	4	0	0	4	1
9	FW	(Germany) GER	Sascha Mölders	36	8	30+4	8	0+1	0	1	0
11	DF	(Germany) GER	Christian Köppel	6	0	1+3	0	0	0	2	0
13	FW	(Germany) GER	Prince Owusu	16	3	8+8	3	0	0	0	0
14	MF	(Germany) GER	Dennis Dressel	5	0	2+1	0	0	0	0+2	0
16	MF	(Germany) GER	Benjamin Kindsvater	25	2	8+14	2	1	0	2	0
17	DF	(Germany) GER	Daniel Wein	38	2	36	2	1	0	1	0
18	FW	(Germany) GER	Nico Karger	32	6	28+3	5	1	1	0	0
19	MF	(Germany) GER	Alessandro Abruscia	16	2	5+8	2	0	0	3	0
20	MF	(Germany) GER	Efkan Bekiroğlu	33	5	23+6	3	0	0	4	2
22	DF	(Germany) GER	Aaron Berzel	15	0	8+6	0	0	0	0+1	0
24	FW	(Germany) GER	Markus Ziereis	13	4	5+5	0	0+1	0	2	4
25	MF	(Germany) GER	Marius Willsch	22	0	11+8	0	1	0	1+1	0
27	DF	(Germany) GER	Semi Belkahia	6	0	2+2	0	0	0	2	0
28	DF	(Germany) GER	Herbert Paul	36	4	29+3	2	1	0	2+1	2
31	MF	(Togo) TOG	Kodjovi Koussou	10	0	5+5	0	0	0	0	0
32	DF	(Germany) GER	Simon Lorenz	40	4	36+1	3	1	0	1+1	1
34	MF	(Germany) GER	Kristian Böhnlein	8	0	1+2	0	0+1	0	3+1	0
38	MF	(France) FRA	Romuald Lacazette	13	0	6+5	0	0	0	1+1	0
36	DF	(Germany) GER	Phillipp Steinhart	38	5	36	5	1	0	1	0
39	GK	(Germany) GER	Hendrik Bonmann	6	0	6	0	0	0	0	0
44	DF	(Russia) RUS	Leon Klassen	1	0	0	0	0	0	0+1	0
Players away on loan:
8	MF	(Germany) GER	Simon Seferings	2	0	0	0	0	0	2	0
Players who featured but departed the club permanently during the season:
10	FW	(Germany) GER	Adriano Grimaldi	22	5	16+3	5	1	0	0+2	0
23	FW	(Germany) GER	Nicholas Helmbrecht	1	0	0	0	0	0	0+1	0

=== Goal scorers ===
Place	Position	Nation	Number	Name	3. Liga	DFB-Pokal	Bavarian Cup	Total
1	FW	(Germany)	9	Sascha Mölders	8	0	0	8
2	FW	(Germany)	18	Nico Karger	5	1	0	6
3	FW	(Germany)	10	Adriano Grimaldi	5	0	0	5
3	DF	(Germany)	36	Phillipp Steinhart	5	0	0	5
3	FW	(Germany)	7	Stefan Lex	4	0	1	5
3	MF	(Germany)	20	Efkan Bekiroğlu	3	0	2	5
7	DF	(Germany)	32	Simon Lorenz	3	0	1	4
7	DF	(Germany)	28	Herbert Paul	2	0	2	4
7	FW	(Germany)	24	Markus Ziereis	0	0	4	4
10	FW	(Germany)	13	Prince Owusu	3	0	0	3
11	DF	(Germany)	4	Felix Weber	2	0	0	2
11	MF	(Germany)	16	Benjamin Kindsvater	2	0	0	2
11	DF	(Germany)	17	Daniel Wein	2	0	0	2
11	MF	(Germany)	19	Alessandro Abruscia	2	0	0	2
15	MF	(Germany)	5	Quirin Moll	1	0	0	1
15				Own goal	1	0	0	1
Total					48	1	10	59

=== Clean sheets ===
Place	Position	Nation	Number	Name	3. Liga	DFB-Pokal	Bavarian Cup	Total
1	GK	(Germany)	1	Marco Hiller	7	0	2	9
2	GK	(Germany)	39	Hendrik Bonmann	1	0	0	1
Total					8	0	2	10

=== Disciplinary record ===
Number	Nation	Position	Name	3. Liga		DFB-Pokal		Bavarian Cup		Total	
Number	Nation	Position	Name	Booked	Sent off (straight red)	Booked	Sent off (straight red)	Booked	Sent off (straight red)	Booked	Sent off (straight red)
1	(Germany)	GK	Marco Hiller	1	0	0	0	0	0	1	0
2	(Germany)	DF	Eric Weeger	2	0	0	0	0	0	2	0
4	(Germany)	DF	Felix Weber	7	1	0	0	0	0	7	1
5	(Germany)	MF	Quirin Moll	4	0	0	0	0	0	4	0
6	(Germany)	DF	Jan Mauersberger	0	0	0	0	1	0	1	0
7	(Germany)	FW	Stefan Lex	2	0	0	0	0	0	2	0
9	(Germany)	FW	Sascha Mölders	7	0	0	0	0	0	7	0
11	(Germany)	DF	Christian Köppel	1	0	0	0	0	0	1	0
13	(Germany)	FW	Prince Owusu	6	0	0	0	0	0	6	0
16	(Germany)	MF	Benjamin Kindsvater	3	0	0	0	0	0	3	0
17	(Germany)	DF	Daniel Wein	8	0	0	0	0	0	8	0
18	(Germany)	FW	Nico Karger	2	0	0	0	0	0	2	0
20	(Germany)	MF	Efkan Bekiroğlu	3	0	0	0	1	0	4	0
22	(Germany)	DF	Aaron Berzel	4	1	0	0	1	0	5	1
24	(Germany)	FW	Markus Ziereis	1	0	0	0	1	0	2	0
25	(Germany)	MF	Marius Willsch	4	0	0	0	0	0	4	0
27	(Germany)	DF	Semi Belkahia	2	0	0	0	0	0	2	0
28	(Germany)	DF	Herbert Paul	9	3	0	0	0	0	9	3
31	(Togo)	MF	Kodjovi Koussou	1	0	0	0	0	0	1	0
32	(Germany)	DF	Simon Lorenz	4	0	0	0	1	0	5	0
34	(Germany)	MF	Kristian Böhnlein	2	0	0	0	0	0	2	0
36	(Germany)	DF	Phillipp Steinhart	5	0	0	0	1	0	6	0
38	(France)	MF	Romuald Lacazette	3	0	0	0	1	0	4	0
Players away on loan:
8	(Germany)	MF	Simon Seferings	0	0	0	0	1	0	1	0
Players who left 1860 Munich during the season:
10	(Germany)	FW	Adriano Grimaldi	5	0	0	0	0	0	5	0
Total				86	5	0	0	8	0	94	5
