= 2016–17 FSV Zwickau season =

FSV Zwickau
2016–17 season
- Chairman: Gerhard Neef
- Manager: Torsten Ziegner
- Stadium: Stadion Zwickau
- 3. Liga: 5th
- DFB-Pokal: First round
- Saxony Cup: Semi-final
Home colours	Away colours

The 2016–17 FSV Zwickau season was their first season in the 3. Liga, the third tier of German football.

== Events ==
FSV Zwickau won promotion after beating SV Elversberg in the 2015–16 Regionalliga promotion play-offs.

== Transfers ==
=== In ===
Pos.	Name	Age	From	Type	Transfer Window	Contract ends	Transfer fee	Ref.
GK	(Germany) Maximilian Rosenkranz	19	FSV Zwickau U19	Transfer	Summer	2018	Free	
DF	(Germany) Lukas Wilton	21	Hannover 96 II	Transfer	Summer	2018		
DF	(Germany) Marcel Gebers	30	Kickers Offenbach	Transfer	Summer	2018		
MF	(Germany) Felix Geisler	19	FC Energie Cottbus	Transfer	Summer	2017		
DF	(Germany) Alexander Sorge	23	RB Leipzig II	Transfer	Summer	2017		
MF	(Germany) Marcel Bär	24	FC Carl Zeiss Jena	Transfer	Summer	2017		
GK	(Germany) Johannes Brinkies	23	F.C. Hansa Rostock	Transfer	Summer	2018		

=== Out ===
Pos.	Name	Age	To	Type	Transfer Window	Transfer fee	Ref.
DF	(Germany) Sebastian Mai	22	SC Preußen Münster	Transfer	Summer		
MF	(Germany) Patrick Grandner	28	VFC Plauen	Transfer	Summer		

== Friendly matches ==
Win	Draw	Loss

Date	Time (Note: Time shown in local time (CEST or CET))	Opponent	Venue	Result (Note: FSV Zwickau's score shown first)	Scorers	Attendance	Ref.

== Competitions ==
=== 3. Liga ===
==== League table ====
Pos	Team	Pld	W	D	L	GF	GA	GD	Pts	Promotion, qualification or relegation
3	Jahn Regensburg (O, P)	38	18	9	11	62	50	+12	63	Qualification for promotion play-offs and DFB-Pokal
4	1. FC Magdeburg	38	16	13	9	53	36	+17	61	Qualification for DFB-Pokal
5	FSV Zwickau	38	16	8	14	47	54	−7	56	
6	VfL Osnabrück	38	15	9	14	46	43	+3	54	
7	Wehen Wiesbaden	38	14	11	13	45	42	+3	53	

Source: DFB
Rules for classification: 1) Points; 2) Goal difference; 3) Goals scored
(O) Play-off winners; (P) Promoted

==== Matches ====
Win	Draw	Loss

Date	Time	Opponent	Venue	Result	Scorers	Attendance	Referee	Ref.
30 July 2016	20:00	Mainz 05 II	Away	2–2	Frick 28', König 61'	1,798	Heft	

=== DFB-Pokal ===
Win	Draw	Loss

Round	Date	Time	Opponent	Venue	Result	Scorers	Attendance	Referee	Ref.
First round	22 August 2016	18:30	Hamburger SV	Home	0–1	—	10,134	Kempter	

=== Saxony Cup ===
Win	Draw	Loss

Round	Date	Time	Opponent	Venue	Result	Scorers	Attendance	Referee	Ref.
Last 16	8 October 2016	14:30	FC Grimma	Away	2–0				
Quarter-final	12 November 2016	13:00	VfB Auerbach	Away	2–1 (a.e.t.)				
Semi-final	19 April 2017	19:30	Chemnitzer FC	Away	1–2 (a.e.t.)				

== Player information ==
As of 11 June 2016.

No.	Pos	Nat	Player	Total		3. Liga		DFB-Pokal		Saxony Cup	
No.	Pos	Nat	Player	Apps	Goals	Apps	Goals	Apps	Goals	Apps	Goals
1	GK	(Germany) GER	Tom Neukam	0	0	0	0	0	0	0	0
2	DF	(Germany) GER	Patrick Wolf	0	0	0	0	0	0	0	0
4	DF	(Germany) GER	Robert Paul	0	0	0	0	0	0	0	0
5	MF	(Germany) GER	Aykut Öztürk	0	0	0	0	0	0	0	0
6	DF	(Germany) GER	Christoph Göbel	0	0	0	0	0	0	0	0
7	FW	(Germany) GER	Oliver Genausch	0	0	0	0	0	0	0	0
8	FW	(Germany) GER	Jonas Nietfeld	0	0	0	0	0	0	0	0
10	MF	(Germany) GER	Michael Schlicht	0	0	0	0	0	0	0	0
11	FW	(Germany) GER	Marc-Philipp Zimmermann	0	0	0	0	0	0	0	0
14	MF	(Germany) GER	Toni Wachsmuth	0	0	0	0	0	0	0	0
16	MF	(Germany) GER	Benjamin Keller	0	0	0	0	0	0	0	0
17	MF	(Germany) GER	Morris Schröter	0	0	0	0	0	0	0	0
19	FW	(Germany) GER	Davy Frick	0	0	0	0	0	0	0	0
20	DF	(Germany) GER	René Lange	0	0	0	0	0	0	0	0
21	GK	(Germany) GER	Marian Unger	0	0	0	0	0	0	0	0
22	DF	(Kazakhstan) KAZ	Robert Berger	0	0	0	0	0	0	0	0
23	MF	(Germany) GER	Alexander Morosow	0	0	0	0	0	0	0	0
27	FW	(Germany) GER	Kevin Bönisch	0	0	0	0	0	0	0	0
31	MF	(Germany) GER	Patrick Göbel	0	0	0	0	0	0	0	0
	GK	(Germany) GER	Maximilian Rosenkranz	0	0	0	0	0	0	0	0
	DF	(Germany) GER	Lukas Wilton	0	0	0	0	0	0	0	0
	DF	(Germany) GER	Marcel Gebers	0	0	0	0	0	0	0	0
	MF	(Germany) GER	Felix Geisler	0	0	0	0	0	0	0	0
	DF	(Germany) GER	Alexander Sorge	0	0	0	0	0	0	0	0
	MF	(Germany) GER	Marcel Bär	0	0	0	0	0	0	0	0
	GK	(Germany) GER	Johannes Brinkies	0	0	0	0	0	0	0	0
