= The (disambiguation) =

The is the English language's definite article.

The, or THE, may also refer to:

== Letters ==
- ٺ, ṭhē (Arabic script), used in Sindhi
- Ҫ, the (Cyrillic), used in Enets, Chuvash, and Bashkir

== Arts and media ==
=== Literature ===
- Times Higher Education, UK publication
- The (imprint), brand of books edited by Indigo Theophanes Dax and published by OmniScriptum (formerly VDM Verlag Dr. Müller) or a subsidiary

=== Music ===
- The The, a British music group
- The..., a 2010 EP by Junsu/Jejung/Yuchun (now known as JYJ)
- "T.H.E. (The Hardest Ever)", a 2011 single by American musical artist will.i.am

=== Other media ===
- "The", episode 22 of season 2 of Aqua Teen Hunger Force
- "THE", a trademark shared by The Ohio State University and fashion designer Marc Jacobs

== Computing ==
- THE multiprogramming system, a computer operating system
- The Hessling Editor, a text editor modeled on the VM/CMS editor XEDIT
- The Humane Environment (now named Archy), an experimental software system

== Transport ==
- THE, the IATA code for Teresina Airport in the state of Piauí, Brazil
- THE, the MTR code for Tin Heng stop, a light rail stop in Hong Kong
- THE, the National Rail code for Theale railway station in the county of Berkshire, England
- Trans Hudson Express Tunnel, a proposed rail tunnel in the New York metro area, US

== Other uses ==
- The (surname), alternative spelling of the Chinese surname Zheng (simplified Chinese: 郑; traditional Chinese: 鄭) commonly used in Indonesia
- Technische Hogeschool Eindhoven, now Eindhoven University of Technology, Netherlands
- Transhiatal esophagectomy, a surgical procedure

== See also ==
- Thee (disambiguation)
- Teh, an Internet slang neologism
