= Stefan Schmidt (footballer, born 1989) =

German footballer

Personal information
- Date of birth: 8 March 1989 (age 37)
- Place of birth: Flöha, East Germany
- Position: Goalkeeper

Team information
- Current team: VfB Auerbach
- Number: 30

Youth career
- TSV Flöha
- –2008: Chemnitzer FC

Senior career*
Years	Team	Apps	(Gls)
2008–2013	Chemnitzer FC	22	(0)
2013–2014	Carl Zeiss Jena	5	(0)
2014–2016	Empor Glauchau	48	(0)
2016–	VfB Auerbach	158	(1)
- * Club domestic league appearances and goals as of 17:52, 29 May 2022 (UTC)

Stefan Schmidt (born 8 March 1989) is a German footballer who plays as a goalkeeper for Regionalliga Nordost club VfB Auerbach.

== Career ==
Schmidt came through the Chemnitzer FC's youth team, and made his first-team debut on the last day of the 2008–09 season as a half-time substitute for Enrico Keller in a 1–1 draw against 1. FC Magdeburg. For the next four years, he largely served as understudy to Philipp Pentke, and made 13 appearances in the 2010–11 season as the club won the Regionalliga Nord and promotion to the 3. Liga. In his first season at this level, he was confined entirely to the bench, but he made eight appearances during the 2012–13 season when Pentke was out injured. He signed for Carl Zeiss Jena of the Regionalliga Nordost in July 2013. He left Jena after one season and has had subsequent spells with Empor Glauchau and VfB Auerbach.
