= Adriano Grimaldi =

German footballer

Personal information
- Date of birth: 5 April 1991 (age 35)
- Place of birth: Göttingen, Germany
- Height: 1.88 m (6 ft 2 in)
- Position: Forward

Team information
- Current team: 1. FC Nürnberg
- Number: 33

Youth career
- 1996–2005: Nikolausberger SC
- 2005–2006: SC Weende
- 2006–2008: Hannover 96
- 2008–2009: SC Weende

Senior career*
Years	Team	Apps	(Gls)
2009	FC Sachsen Leipzig	12	(2)
2009–2011	Mainz 05 II	43	(11)
2009–2011	Mainz 05	6	(0)
2011–2012	Fortuna Düsseldorf II	3	(1)
2011–2012	Fortuna Düsseldorf	7	(1)
2012	→ SV Sandhausen (loan)	10	(0)
2012–2014	VfL Osnabrück	56	(13)
2014–2016	1. FC Heidenheim	26	(2)
2016–2018	Preußen Münster	71	(30)
2018–2019	1860 Munich	19	(5)
2019–2021	KFC Uerdingen 05	34	(7)
2021–2023	1. FC Saarbrücken	57	(20)
2023–2025	SC Paderborn	60	(18)
2025–	1. FC Nürnberg	26	(1)

International career
2010	Germany U19	2	(0)
- * Club domestic league appearances and goals as of 18 May 2026

Adriano Grimaldi (born 5 April 1991) is a German professional footballer who plays as a forward for 2. Bundesliga club 1. FC Nürnberg.

== Early and personal life ==
Grimaldi was born and raised in Göttingen, Germany, to an Italian father and a Moroccan mother. He was one of six siblings, with his older brother Marco Grimaldi being a basketball player.

== Club career ==
Grimaldi started his career at FC Sachsen Leipzig in 2009, where he scored twice in 12 matches.

Grimaldi signed for 1. FSV Mainz 05 ahead of the 2009-10 season, but only made six appearances with the senior team. However, he made many appearances for the second team, and scored 11 goals in 43 appearances.

On 19 May 2011, he signed a two-year contract with Fortuna Düsseldorf. Grimaldi split time between the first team and the second team, and made nine appearances in all competitions with the first team, scoring once in the league.

Grimaldi joined SV Sandhausen on loan for the conclusion of the 2011–12 3. Liga, and he made 10 appearances for Sandhausen as they won the league.

Ahead of the 2012–13 3. Liga season, Grimaldi joined VfL Osnabrück. Across two seasons, he scored 13 goals across 60 matches in all competitions, including 11 in the 2013–14 season.

On 13 May 2014, he signed a three-year contract with FC Heidenheim.

In 2016, Grimaldi signed a two-year contract with 3. Liga team SC Preußen Münster. He scored 30 goals in 71 league appearances, and also made six appearances in various cup competitions.

Grimaldi joined 1860 Munich on a three-year contract in June 2018, but in January 2019 he signed for KFC Uerdingen 05 on a two-and-a-half-year contract.

On 25 May 2021, Grimaldi signed a two-year contract with 1. FC Saarbrücken.

On 1 June 2023, Grimaldi signed for 2. Bundesliga club SC Paderborn. In April 2025, his contract with the club was extended to summer 2026.

On 1 September 2025, Grimaldi moved to 1. FC Nürnberg.

== International career ==
Born in Germany, Grimaldi is of Italian and Moroccan descent. He was a youth international for Germany.

=== Club ===
As of match played 3 May 2026

Appearances and goals by club, season and competition
Club	Season	League			Cup		Other		Total	
Club	Season	Division	Apps	Goals	Apps	Goals	Apps	Goals	Apps	Goals
FC Sachsen Leipzig	2008–09	Regionalliga Nord	12	2	—		—		12	2
Mainz 05 II	2009–10	Regionalliga West	18	4	—		—		18	4
Mainz 05 II	2010–11	Regionalliga West	25	7	—		—		25	7
Mainz 05 II	Total		43	11	—		—		43	11
Mainz 05	2009–10	Bundesliga	6	0	—		—		6	0
Fortuna Düsseldorf II	2011–12	Regionalliga West	3	1	—		—		3	1
Fortuna Düsseldorf	2011–12	2. Bundesliga	7	1	2	0	—		9	1
SV Sandhausen (loan)	2011–12	3. Liga	10	0	—		—		10	0
VfL Osnabrück	2012–13	3. Liga	27	2	—		2 (Note: Appearances in relegation play-offs)	0	29	2
VfL Osnabrück	2013–14	3. Liga	29	11	2	0	0	0	31	11
VfL Osnabrück	Total		56	13	2	0	2	0	60	13
1. FC Heidenheim	2014–15	2. Bundesliga	16	1	1	1	—		17	2
1. FC Heidenheim	2015–16	2. Bundesliga	10	1	2	0	—		12	0
1. FC Heidenheim	Total		26	2	3	1	—		29	3
Preußen Münster	2015–16	3. Liga	11	3	—		—		11	3
Preußen Münster	2016–17	3. Liga	28	12	—		2 (Note: Appearances in Westphalian Cup)	0	30	12
Preußen Münster	2017–18	3. Liga	32	15	—		1	0	33	15
Preußen Münster	Total		71	30	—		3	0	74	30
1860 Munich	2018–19	3. Liga	19	5	1	0	2 (Note: Appearances in Bavarian Cup)	0	22	5
KFC Uerdingen 05	2018–19	3. Liga	4	1	—		0	0	4	1
KFC Uerdingen 05	2019–20	3. Liga	9	1	—		1 (Note: Appearance in Lower Saxony Cup)	2	10	3
KFC Uerdingen 05	2020–21	3. Liga	21	5	—		0	0	21	5
KFC Uerdingen 05	Total		34	7	—		1	2	35	9
1. FC Saarbrücken	2021–22	3. Liga	24	11	—		1 (Note: Appearances in Saarland Cup)	0	25	11
1. FC Saarbrücken	2022–23	3. Liga	33	9	—		2	1	35	10
1. FC Saarbrücken	Total		57	20	—		3	1	60	21
Paderborn 07	2023–24	2. Bundesliga	28	10	3	0	—		31	10
Paderborn 07	2024–25	2. Bundesliga	29	8	2	2	—		31	10
Paderborn 07	2025–26	2. Bundesliga	3	0	1	2	—		4	2
Paderborn 07	Total		60	18	6	4	—		66	22
1. FC Nürnberg	2025–26	2. Bundesliga	26	1	—		—		26	1
1. FC Nürnberg	2026–27	2. Bundesliga	0	0	0	0	—		0	0
1. FC Nürnberg	Total		26	1	0	0	—		26	1
Career total			430	105	14	5	11	3	455	113

== Honours ==
SV Sandhausen

- 3. Liga: 2011–12

VfL Osnabrück

- 3. Liga third place: 2012–13
