= Toni Wachsmuth =

German footballer (born 1986)

Personal information
- Date of birth: 15 November 1986 (age 39)
- Place of birth: Neuhaus (Rennweg), East Germany
- Height: 1.82 m (5 ft 11 1/2 in)
- Position: Centre back

Team information
- Current team: 1. FC Lok Leipzig (sporting director)

Youth career
- 1991–1998: FSV 95 Oberweißbach
- 1998–2004: Carl Zeiss Jena

Senior career*
Years	Team	Apps	(Gls)
2004–2007	Carl Zeiss Jena	32	(1)
2007–2008	Energie Cottbus II	31	(1)
2008–2011	SC Paderborn 07	36	(3)
2011–2014	Chemnitzer FC	66	(4)
2014–2019	FSV Zwickau	149	(26)
- * Club domestic league appearances and goals

Toni Wachsmuth (born 15 November 1986) is a German footballer and current sporting director of FSV Zwickau.

== Management career ==
On 19 February 2019, it was confirmed, that Wachsmuth would retire at the end of the season and would become the sporting director of FSV Zwickau.

== Career statistics ==
As of 3 January 2020

Appearances and goals by club, season and competition
Club	Season	League			National Cup		Other		Total	
Club	Season	Division	Apps	Goals	Apps	Goals	Apps	Goals	Apps	Goals
Carl Zeiss Jena	2005–06	Regionalliga Nord	5	0	—		0	0	5	0
Carl Zeiss Jena	2006–07	2. Bundesliga	16	1	0	0	0	0	16	1
Carl Zeiss Jena	Total		21	1	0	0	0	0	21	1
Energie Cottbus II	2007–08	Regionalliga Nord	31	1	—		0	0	31	1
SC Paderborn 07	2008–09	3. Liga	18	1	0	0	2 (Note: Appearance(s) in play-offs for 2. Bundesliga)	0	20	1
SC Paderborn 07	2009–10	2. Bundesliga	3	1	1	0	0	0	4	1
SC Paderborn 07	2010–11	2. Bundesliga	15	1	1	0	0	0	16	1
SC Paderborn 07	Total		36	3	2	0	2	0	40	3
Chemnitzer FC	2011–12	3. Liga	35	2	—		0	0	35	2
Chemnitzer FC	2012–13	3. Liga	22	2	1	0	0	0	23	2
Chemnitzer FC	2013–14	3. Liga	9	0	—		0	0	9	0
Chemnitzer FC	Total		66	4	1	0	0	0	67	4
FSV Zwickau	2014–15	Regionalliga Nordost	27	4	—		0	0	27	4
FSV Zwickau	2015–16	Regionalliga Nordost	31	6	—		2 (Note: Appearance(s) in play-offs for 3. Liga)	1	33	7
FSV Zwickau	2016–17	3. Liga	31	3	1	0	0	0	32	3
FSV Zwickau	2017–18	3. Liga	24	2	—		0	0	24	2
FSV Zwickau	2018–19	3. Liga	34	10	—		0	0	34	10
FSV Zwickau	Total		147	25	1	0	2	1	150	26
Career total			301	34	4	0	4	1	309	35
