= Phillipp Steinhart =

German professional footballer (born 1992)

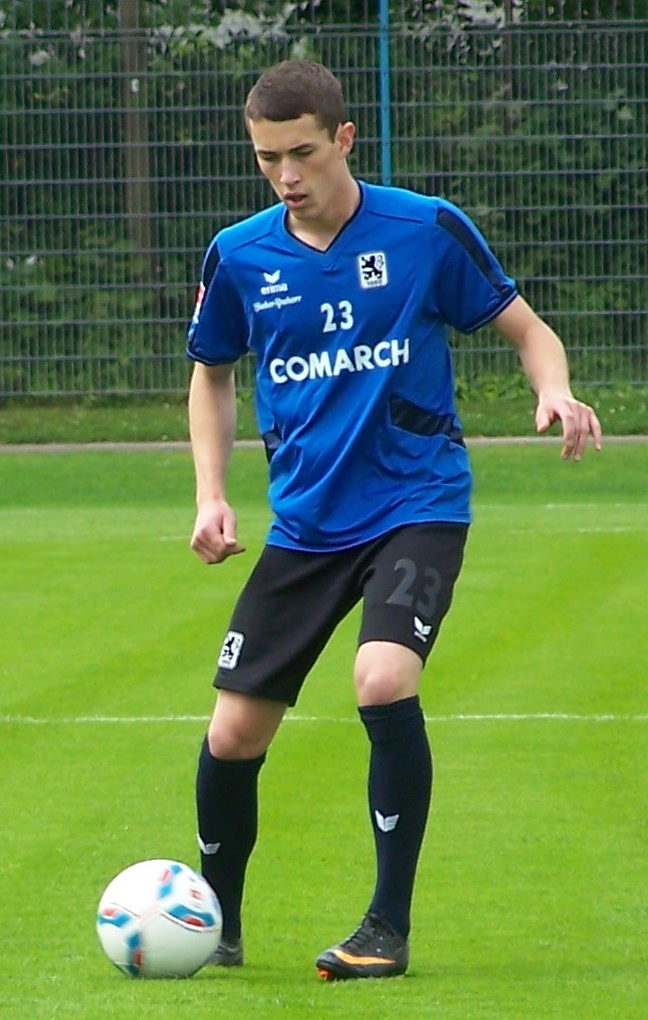
- Steinhart in 2011

Personal information
- Date of birth: 7 July 1992 (age 34)
- Place of birth: Dachau, Germany
- Height: 1.82 m (6 ft 0 in)
- Position: Left back

Team information
- Current team: FC 08 Homburg
- Number: 36

Youth career
- –2003: TSV Gernlinden
- 2003–2004: SC Fürstenfeldbruck
- 2004–2011: 1860 Munich

Senior career*
Years	Team	Apps	(Gls)
2011–2014	1860 Munich II	94	(3)
2011–2014	1860 Munich	1	(0)
2014–2016	Bayern Munich II	56	(4)
2015–2016	Bayern Munich	0	(0)
2016–2017	Sportfreunde Lotte	30	(1)
2017–2024	1860 Munich	208	(19)
2024–	FC 08 Homburg	64	(4)

International career
2008	Germany U16	1	(0)
2008	Germany U17	2	(0)
- * Club domestic league appearances and goals as of 24 September 2026

Phillipp Steinhart (born 7 July 1992) is a German professional footballer who plays as a left back for FC 08 Homburg.

== Club career ==
=== Youth career ===
Born in Dachau, Steinhart grew up in Gernlinden, a district of Maisach. He started playing football at the age of eight and his first club was local TSV Gernlinden. Subsequently, he spent a year at SC Fürstenfeldbruck, before joining local heavyweights 1860 Munich in 2004.

=== 1860 Munich, Bayern Munich, and Sportfreunde Lotte ===
Steinhart made an appearance for 1860 Munich during the 2011–12 season. However, most of his playing time at 1860 Munich was with the reserve team. He made 30 appearances for the reserve team in the 2011–12 Regionalliga season, 36 appearances in the 2012–13 season, and 30 appearances in the 2013–14 season.

Then Steinhart transferred to Bayern Munich II. During the 2014–15 season, Steinhart scored two goals in 29 appearances. During the 2015–16 season, Steinhart scored a goal in 27 appearances.

Steinhart transferred to Sportfreunde Lotte. He finished the 2016–17 season with one goal in 30 league appearances and three German Cup appearances.

=== Return to 1860 Munich ===
Steinhart returned to 1860 Munich and made his return on matchday seven against FV Illertissen. During the 2018–19 season, Steinhart scored five goals in 36 3. Liga appearances and one German Cup appearance.

== International career ==
Steinhart also earned three caps for Germany national youth teams.

== Career statistics ==
As of match played 18 May 2024

Appearances and goals by club, season and competition
Club	Season	League			Cup		Other		Total		Ref.
Club	Season	Division	Apps	Goals	Apps	Goals	Apps	Goals	Apps	Goals	Ref.
1860 Munich	2011–12	2. Bundesliga	1	0	0	0	—		1	0	
1860 Munich II	2011–12	Regionalliga Süd	30	0	—		—		34	1	
1860 Munich II	2012–13	Regionalliga Bayern	34	1	—		2 (Note: Appearances in the Regionalliga Promotion Playoff)	0	36	1	
1860 Munich II	2013–14	Regionalliga Bayern	30	2	—		—		30	2	
1860 Munich II	Total		94	3	—		2	0	96	3	—
Bayern Munich II	2014–15	Regionalliga Bayern	29	2	—		—		29	1	
Bayern Munich II	2015–16	Regionalliga Bayern	27	1	—		—		27	1	
Bayern Munich II	Total		56	3	—		—		56	3	—
Sportfreunde Lotte	2016–17	3. Liga	30	1	3	0	—		33	1	
1860 Munich	2017–18	Regionalliga Bayern	29	1	—		2	0	31	1	
1860 Munich	2018–19	3. Liga	36	5	1	0	—		37	1	
1860 Munich	2019–20	3. Liga	34	1	—		—		34	1	
1860 Munich	2020–21	3. Liga	36	9	1	1	—		37	10	
1860 Munich	2021–22	3. Liga	33	2	3	1	—		36	3	
1860 Munich	2022–23	3. Liga	26	1	1	0	—		27	1	
1860 Munich	2023–24	3. Liga	13	0	—		—		13	0	
1860 Munich	Total		207	19	6	2	2	0	215	19	—
1860 Munich II	2023–24	Bayernliga Süd	1	0	—		—		1	0	
Career total			389	26	9	2	4	0	402	28	—
