= Simon Lorenz =

German footballer (born 1997)

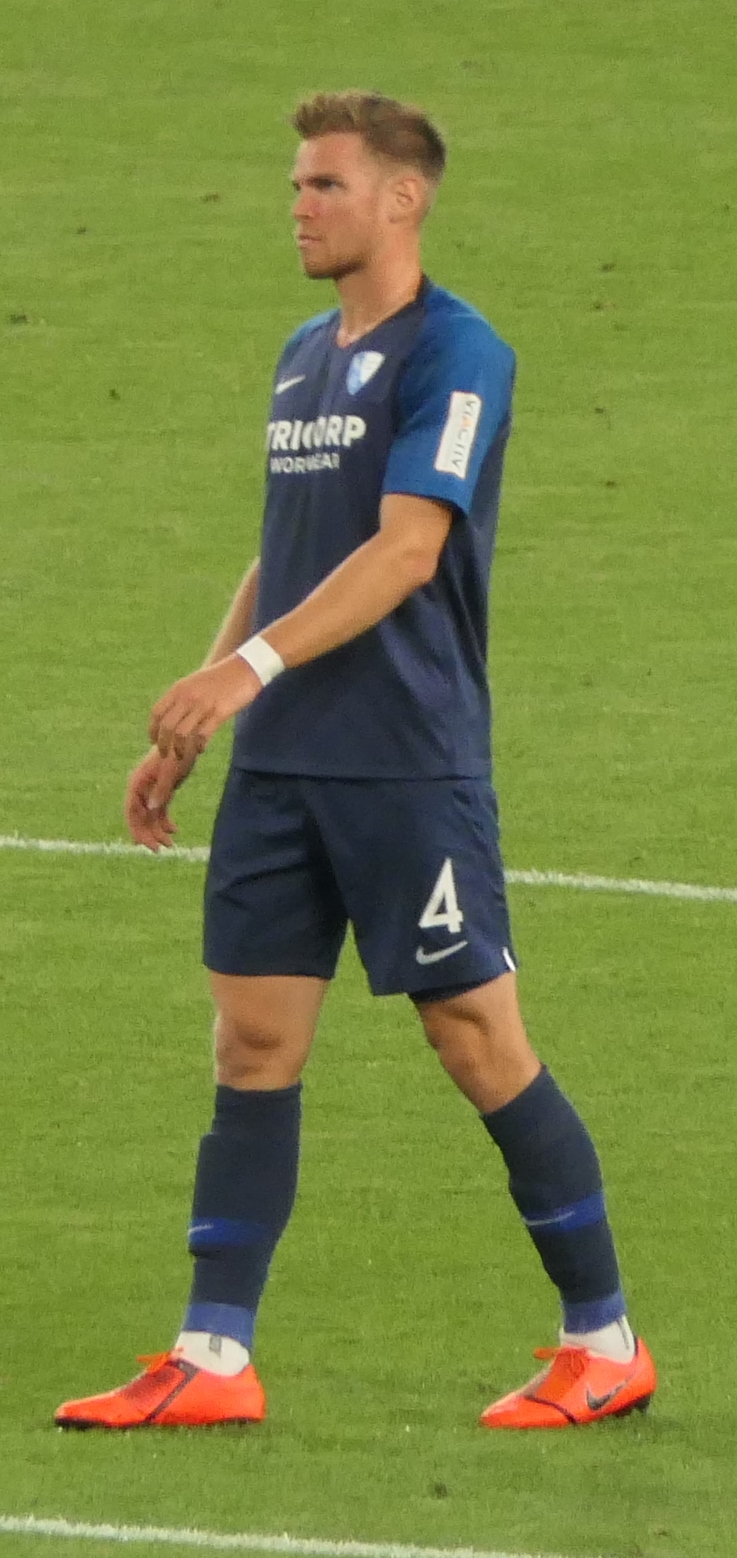
- Lorenz with VfL Bochum in 2019

Personal information
- Date of birth: 30 March 1997 (age 29)
- Place of birth: Buchen, Germany
- Height: 1.86 m (6 ft 1 in)
- Position: Centre-back

Team information
- Current team: FC Ingolstadt 04
- Number: 32

Youth career
- TSV Sulzbach
- –2009: SV Schefflenz
- 2009–2016: 1899 Hoffenheim

Senior career*
Years	Team	Apps	(Gls)
2016–2018	1899 Hoffenheim II	52	(7)
2017–2018	1899 Hoffenheim	0	(0)
2018–2020	VfL Bochum	16	(1)
2018–2019	→ 1860 Munich (loan)	37	(3)
2020–2023	Holstein Kiel	68	(3)
2023–	FC Ingolstadt 04	104	(9)
- * Club domestic league appearances and goals as of 29 May 2026

Simon Lorenz (born 30 March 1997) is a German professional footballer who plays as a centre-back for 3. Liga club FC Ingolstadt 04.

Lorenz started his career at 1899 Hoffenheim, debuting for their reserve team in 2016. He made his debut for their first team in the Europa League in December 2017. He joined VfL Bochum of the 2. Bundesliga in January 2018, before spending the 2018–19 season on loan at 3. Liga side 1860 Munich. He signed for fellow 2. Bundesliga side Holstein Kiel in summer 2020.

== Early life ==
Born in Buchen, Lorenz attended Wilhelmi-Gymnasium in Sinsheim.

== Club career ==
=== 1899 Hoffenheim ===
After playing youth football for TSV Sulzbach and SV Schefflenz, he joined 1899 Hoffenheim's academy in the summer of 2009. In summer 2016, he was promoted to their reserve team. He scored 4 goals in 35 matches in the Regionalliga Südwest across the 2016–17 season. He made his senior debut for the club in a 1–1 Europa League draw against Ludogorets Razgrad on 7 December 2017. He scored 3 in 17 in the Regionalliga Südwest across the 2017–18 season.

=== VfL Bochum ===
On 31 January 2018, Lorenz signed for VfL Bochum on a contract until summer 2020, but failed to appear for their first team during the 2017–18 season. In July 2018, Lorenz signed for 1860 Munich of the 3. Liga on a year-long loan deal. He made his debut for the club on 28 July 2018 as a half-time substitute in a 1–0 defeat against 1. FC Kaiserslautern in the opening game of the season. He made his starting debut for the club on 4 August 2018 and scored the opening goal of the game with a 13th-minute header in a 5–1 win at home to Sportfreunde Lotte. He appeared in 37 of the club's 38 league matches across the 2018–19 season, missing just the final match of the season, and scored 3 goals.

Lorenz returned to VfL Bochum for the 2019–20 season, and made his debut for the club in the 3–1 defeat to SSV Jahn Regensburg on 28 July 2019. He scored his first goal for the club on 4 November 2019 with the second goal of a 3–1 win over 1. FC Nürnberg. He made 17 appearances and scored once in the league across the 2019–20 season. His contract was not renewed at the end of the season.

=== Holstein Kiel ===
In June 2020, Lorenz signed for fellow 2. Bundesliga club Holstein Kiel on a free transfer on a three-year contract. He made his debut for the club in a 7–1 DFB-Pokal victory over 1. FC Rielasingen-Arlen on 13 September 2020. He made his league debut for the club on 24 January 2021 in a 2–0 victory over SV Darmstadt 98. He was part of the Kiel team that reached the semi-finals of the 2020–21 DFB-Pokal, where they lost 5–0 to Borussia Dortmund on 1 May 2021.

=== FC Ingolstadt ===
On 5 July 2023, Lorenz signed for FC Ingolstadt 04 on a free transfer.

== International career ==
Lorenz was called up to the Germany national under-18 team once but failed to make an appearance.

== Style of play ==
He played as both an attacking midfielder and defensive midfielder in his youth career but transitioned to play as a centre-back for their reserve team.

== Career statistics ==
As of match played 13 May 2021

Appearances and goals by club, season and competition
Club	Season	League			Cup		Continental		Other		Total	
Club	Season	Division	Apps	Goals	Apps	Goals	Apps	Goals	Apps	Goals	Apps	Goals
1899 Hoffenheim II	2016–17	Regionalliga Südwest	35	4	—		—		—		35	4
1899 Hoffenheim II	2017–18	Regionalliga Südwest	17	3	—		—		—		17	3
1899 Hoffenheim II	Total		52	7	0	0	0	0	0	0	52	7
1899 Hoffenheim	2017–18	Bundesliga	0	0	0	0	1 (Note: Appearance(s) in UEFA Europa League)	0	—		1	0
VfL Bochum	2017–18	2. Bundesliga	0	0	0	0	—		—		0	0
VfL Bochum	2018–19	2. Bundesliga	0	0	0	0	—		—		0	0
VfL Bochum	2019–20	2. Bundesliga	16	1	1	0	—		—		17	1
VfL Bochum	Total		16	1	1	0	0	0	0	0	17	1
1860 Munich (loan)	2018–19	3. Liga	37	3	1	0	—		—		38	3
Holstein Kiel	2020–21	2. Bundesliga	17	1	4	0	—		1 (Note: Appearances in Bundesliga relegation playoffs)	1	22	2
Career total			122	12	6	0	1	0	1	1	130	13
