= Thee (disambiguation) =

Thee is an archaic form of 'you'.

Thee may also refer to:

- Thee (1981 film), Tamil film about two brothers: one a policeman, the other a smuggler
- Thee (2009 film), Tamil film about an honest policeman who becomes a corrupt politician
- Stephan Thee, German footballer
- Megan Thee Stallion, American rapper
