= Regionalliga Nordost =

- Organising body: North East German Football Association
- Founded: 1994
- Country: Germany
- States: Berlin; Brandenburg; Mecklenburg-Western Pomerania; Saxony-Anhalt; Saxony; Thuringia
- Number of clubs: 18
- Level on pyramid: Level 4
- Promotion to: 3. Liga
- Relegation to: NOFV-Oberliga Nord; NOFV-Oberliga Süd
- Current champions: Lokomotive Leipzig (2025–26)
- Current: 2026–27 Regionalliga Nordost

The Regionalliga Nordost is the fourth tier of German football in the states of Berlin, Brandenburg, Mecklenburg-Western Pomerania, Saxony-Anhalt, Saxony and Thuringia. These comprise the states of former East Germany as well as West Berlin.

It is one of five leagues at the fourth tier, together with the Regionalliga Bayern, Regionalliga Südwest, Regionalliga Nord and the Regionalliga West. From 1994 to 2000 it was part of the third tier, until the first of many re-structurings of the league system. The last of these occurred in 2012, which saw the Regionalliga Nordost reinstated.

== Overview ==
The Regionalliga Nordost was formed in 1994 to form a regional third level of play between the 2nd Bundesliga and the NOFV-Oberligas Nord, Mitte and Süd. The league was made up of 18 clubs, with two coming from the 2nd Bundesliga and six each from Mitte and Nord while the south only sent four. It was formed alongside three other Regionalligas, the Regionalliga Nord, West/Südwest and Süd. With the introduction of the Regionalliga also went the disbanding of the central division of the NOFV-Oberligas. Its clubs were spread between the remaining two.

The founding members of the Regionalliga Nordost were:

From the 2. Bundesliga:

- Carl Zeiss Jena (Süd)
- Tennis Borussia Berlin (Mitte)

From the NOFV-Oberliga Nord:

- BSV Brandenburg
- Eisenhüttenstädter FC Stahl
- Reinickendorfer Füchse
- FC Berlin
- Spandauer SV
- FSV Optik Rathenow

From the NOFV-Oberliga Mitte:

- 1. FC Union Berlin
- Energie Cottbus
- Türkiyemspor Berlin
- Lok Altmark Stendal
- Hertha BSC Berlin II
- Hertha Zehlendorf

From the NOFV-Oberliga Süd:

- Rot-Weiß Erfurt
- Erzgebirge Aue
- Sachsen Leipzig
- Bischofswerdaer FV 08

The league contained 18 teams throughout its original six years.

The league winner was not always promoted to the 2nd Bundesliga. The champions of the Regionalligas Nord and Nordost had to play-off for a spot in the 2nd Bundesliga from 1996 to 2000. The winner of this contest was promoted, the loser faced the runners-ups of the Regionalligas Süd and West/Südwest for another spot in the second division.

In 1997, Energie Cottbus became the first club from the Regionalliga to reach a German Cup final, losing 2–0 to VfB Stuttgart.

The league was disbanded after six seasons. In 2000, the number of Regionalligas was reduced from four to two. Most clubs from the league went to the Regionalliga Nord, some clubs from the south went to the Regionalliga Süd.

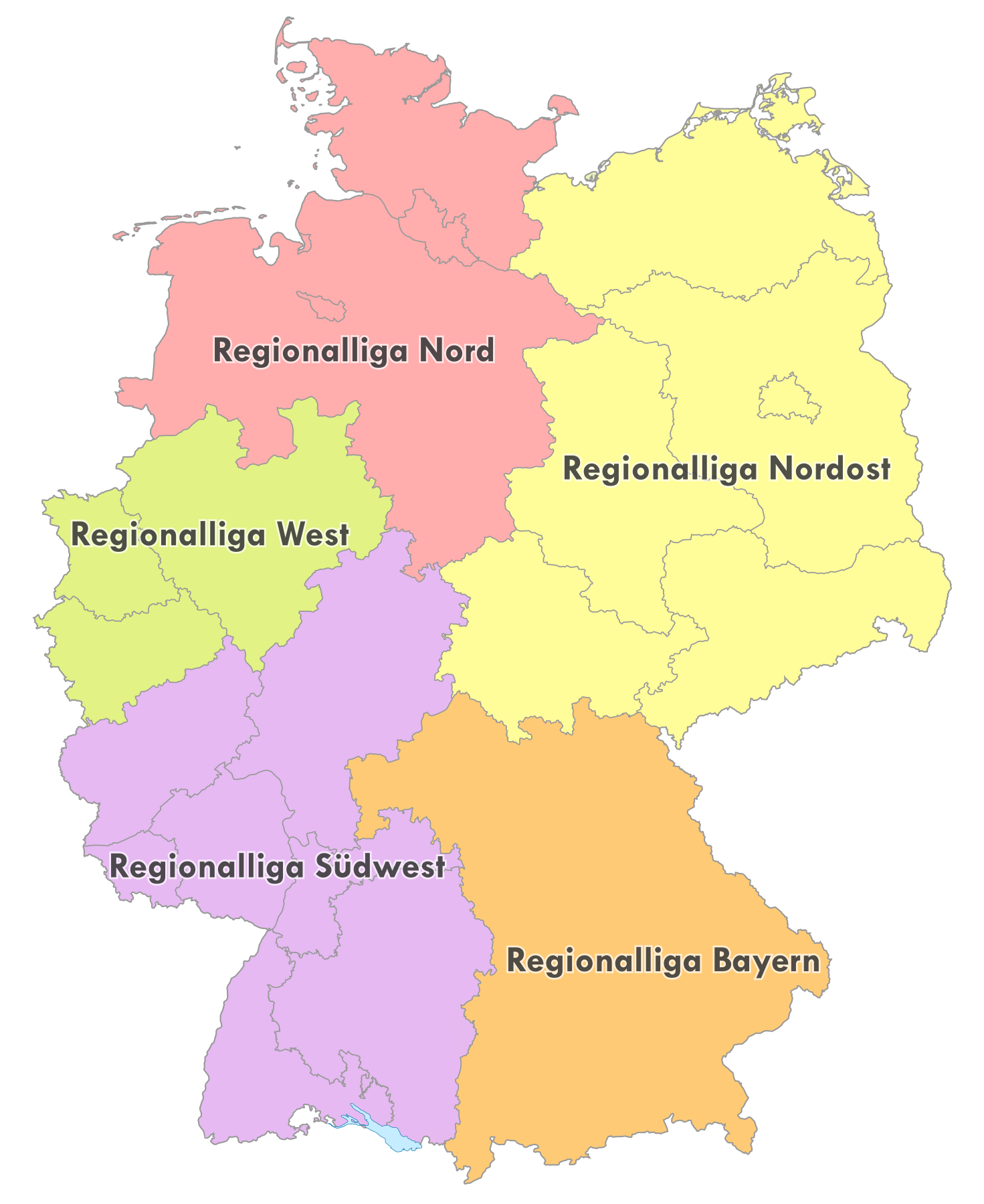
The Regionalligas from 2012 onwards.

With the changes in the German league system in 2008, the number of Regionalligas was extended to three, with the formation of the Regionalliga West, a league which essentially is a reformation of the Regionalliga West/Südwest. The Regionalliga Nordost was not recreated, however. Instead, its clubs remained in the Regionalliga Nord. Teams from its region playing in the Regionalliga Süd moved to the northern group as well, unless they qualified for the 2nd Bundesliga or 3rd Liga.

== Disbanding ==
When the league was discontinued in 2000, the top seven clubs in the league went to the two remaining Regionalligas, five to the north and two to the south, these being the two clubs from the state of Thuringia. The other eleven league teams were relegated to the NOFV-Oberligas.

To the Regionalliga Nord:

- 1. FC Union Berlin
- Dresdner SC
- Erzgebirge Aue
- SV Babelsberg 03
- Sachsen Leipzig

To the Regionalliga Süd:

- Carl Zeiss Jena
- Rot-Weiß Erfurt

== Reestablishment ==
In October 2010, another reform of the Regionalligas was agreed. The number of leagues was again expanded to five. The defunct Regionalliga Nordost was reestablished and a Regionalliga Bayern was established. Also, the Regionalliga West lost the clubs from the south west to a new league, formed out of those clubs and clubs from Regionalliga Süd outside Bavaria. The new system came into operation at the beginning of the 2012–13 season. The number of reserve teams per Regionalliga was limited to seven.

The five league champions, plus the runner-up of the Regionalliga Süd/Südwest, entered play-offs for the three promotion spots. The new leagues consisted of up to 22 clubs in their inaugural season, but were then reduced to between 16 and 18 clubs. The Regionalligas are not administered by the DFB, but rather by the regional football associations. The reorganisation of the Regionalligas, so soon after the last changes in 2008, became necessary because of a large number of insolvencies. These were caused by a lack of media interest in the leagues, large expenses and infrastructure demands.

As four teams were relegated from the 3rd Liga starting at the end of the 2018–19 season, the champions of the Regionalliga Nordost (Chemnitzer FC), the Regionalliga Südwest and the Regionalliga West were promoted directly to the 3. Liga. The remaining two champions, from the Regionalliga Bayern and Nord, played a two-legged promotion play-off for the last promotion spot. In 2020, the three direct promotion spots will go to the champions of the Regionalliga Südwest, Regionalliga Bayern and Regionalliga Nord, and the champions of the Regionalliga Nordost and Regionalliga West will participate in the play-off. This format was installed initially as a temporary solution until the DFB-Bundestag was unsuccessful on a format that could have enabled all Regionalliga champions to be promoted. In September 2019, the Bundestag delegates voted to grant the Südwest and West champions two direct promotions indefinitely starting in 2021. A third direct promotion place will be assigned according to a rotation principle among the Regionalliga Nord, Nordost and Bavarian champions. The representatives from the two remaining Regionalligen will determine the fourth promoted club in two-legged playoffs.

== Overview of football in the Nordost region ==
	Pre–1990	1990–1991	1991–1994	1994–2000	2000–2008	2008–2012	Since 2012
Tier 1	DDR-Oberliga	NOFV-Oberliga	Bundesliga				
Tier 2	DDR-Liga	NOFV-Liga	2. Bundesliga				
Tier 3	Bezirksliga	Bezirksliga (B/MV); Landesliga (SN/TH); Verbandsliga (BB/ST)	NOFV-Oberliga Nord; NOFV-Oberliga Mitte; NOFV-Oberliga Süd	Regionalliga Nordost	Regionalliga Nord; Regionalliga Süd	3. Liga	
Tier 4	Bezirksklasse	Bezirksklasse (B/MV); Bezirksliga (BB/ST); Landesklasse (SN/TH)	Landesliga; Verbandsliga	NOFV-Oberliga Nord; NOFV-Oberliga Süd		Regionalliga Nord	Regionalliga Nordost
Tier 5	Kreisliga	Bezirksklasse (BB/ST); Kreisoberliga	Landesliga; Verbandsliga	Landesliga; Verbandsliga		NOFV-Oberliga Nord; NOFV-Oberliga Süd	

== Winners and runners-up of the Regionalliga Nordost ==
The winners and runners-up of the league:

Season	Winner	Runner-up
1994–95	**Carl Zeiss Jena**	Sachsen Leipzig
1995–96	Tennis Borussia Berlin	Union Berlin
1996–97	**Energie Cottbus**	Erzgebirge Aue
1997–98	**Tennis Borussia Berlin**	Dynamo Dresden
1998–99	**Chemnitzer FC**	VfB Leipzig
1999–2000	Union Berlin	Dresdner SC
2012–13	**RB Leipzig**	Carl Zeiss Jena
2013–14	TSG Neustrelitz	1. FC Magdeburg
2014–15	**1. FC Magdeburg**	FSV Zwickau
2015–16	**FSV Zwickau**	Berliner AK 07
2016–17	**Carl Zeiss Jena**	Energie Cottbus
2017–18	**Energie Cottbus**	FSV Wacker 90 Nordhausen
2018–19	**Chemnitzer FC**	Berliner AK 07
2019–20	Lokomotive Leipzig	VSG Altglienicke
2020–21	**Viktoria Berlin**	VSG Altglienicke
2021–22	BFC Dynamo	Carl Zeiss Jena
2022–23	Energie Cottbus	Carl Zeiss Jena
2023–24	**Energie Cottbus**	Greifswalder FC
2024–25	Lokomotive Leipzig	Hallescher FC
2025–26	Lokomotive Leipzig	Carl Zeiss Jena

Source: "Regionalliga Nordost". Das deutsche Fussball-Archiv.

- Promoted teams in **bold**.

== League statistics ==
The top goalscorers and spectator statistics for the league since it reformed in 2012:

Season	Total attendance	Average attendance	Best supported club	Average attendance	Top goalscorer	Goals
2012–13	434,272	1,809	RB Leipzig	7,563	Daniel Frahn (RBL)	20
2013–14	369,841	1,541	1. FC Magdeburg	5,482	Christian Beck (FCM)	22
2014–15	404,920	1,694	1. FC Magdeburg	8,576	Christian Beck (FCM)	20
2015–16	296,828	970	Carl Zeiss Jena	3,531	Jonas Nietfeld (FSV) Andis Shala (SVB) Marc-Philipp Zimmermann (FSV)	15
2016–17	393,375	1,286	Energie Cottbus	5,433	Federico Palacios Martínez (RBL)	22
2017–18	363,472	1,188	Energie Cottbus	5,263	Rufat Dadashov (BFC)	26
2018–19	355,121	1,161	Chemnitzer FC	4,885	Daniel Frahn (CFC)	24
2019–20	305,421	1,468	Energie Cottbus	6,218	Felix Brügmann (COT)	16
2020–21	87,431	723	BSG Chemie Leipzig	1,571	Marc-Philipp Zimmermann (VfB Auerbach)	11
2021–22	468,364	1,233	Energie Cottbus	4,129	Christian Beck (BFC)	23
2022–23	646,791		Energie Cottbus	6,025	Ziane Djamal (Lokomotive Leipzig)	18

League record

== Placings in the Regionalliga Nordost ==
The following clubs have played in the league and achieved the following final positions:

Club	95	96	97	98	99	00	13	14	15	16	17	18	19	20	21	22	23	24	25
RB Leipzig							1	3L	2B	2B	B	B	B	B	B	B	B	B	B
1. FC Union Berlin	3	2	5	6	6	1	2B	2B	2B	2B	2B	2B	2B	B	B	B	B	B	B
1. FC Magdeburg				12	3	10	6	2	1	3L	3L	3L	2B	3L	3L	3L	2B	2B	2B
Erzgebirge Aue	9	5	2	7	7	3	2B	2B	2B	3L	2B	2B	2B	2B	2B	2B	3L	3L	3L
Dynamo Dresden	B	4	7	2	11	8	2B	2B	3L	3L	2B	2B	2B	2B	3L	2B	3L	3L	3L
Energie Cottbus	7	3	1	2B	2B	2B	2B	2B	3L	3L	2	1	3L	3	9	3	1	1	3L
1. FC Lokomotive Leipzig	2B	2B	2B	2B	2	9	10	15			10	6	6	1	7	6	4	10	1
Hallescher FC							3L	3L	3L	3L	3L	3L	3L	3L	3L	3L	3L	3L	2
Rot-Weiß Erfurt^{2}	5	7	3	5	10	7	3L	3L	3L	3L	3L	3L	5	18			3	13	3
FSV Zwickau	2B	2B	2B	2B	4	18	3	6	2	1	3L	3L	3L	3L	3L	3L	3L	12	4
Carl Zeiss Jena	1	2B	2B	2B	9	4	2	3	4	7	1	3L	3L	3L	4	2	2	7	5
Greifswalder FC																	14	2	6
Chemnitzer FC	2B	2B	4	8	1	2B	3L	3L	3L	3L	3L	3L	1	3L	10	5	8	9	7
BFC Dynamo	11	13	13	11	8	17			5	4	15	4	12	6	6	1	6	4	8
VSG Altglienicke												15	14	2	2	4	5	6	9
Hertha BSC II	13	18				11	5	12	6	10	9	8	4	5	12	8	9	14	10
ZFC Meuselwitz							7	10	14	14	14	10	10	10	18	14	15	11	11
Hertha Zehlendorf	10	12	15	15															12
SV Babelsberg 03				14	15	5	3L	14	11	6	5	5	7	16	11	11	10	5	13
BSG Chemie Leipzig												16		12	3	9	7	8	14
FSV 63 Luckenwalde										16	16	18			14	12	13	15	15
FC Eilenburg																16		16	16
FC Viktoria 1889 Berlin								8	15	12	4	13	11	8	1	3L	12	3	17
VFC Plauen^{6}			10	10	5	13	13	9	16										18
Hansa Rostock II				18														17	
Berliner AK 07							4	11	7	2	6	3	2	7	5	7	11	18	
SV Lichtenberg														11	13	13	16		
Germania Halberstadt							9	13	9	17		7	8	15	17	15	17		
Tennis Borussia Berlin	4	1	6	1	2B	2B									16	10	18		
FSV Union Fürstenwalde											13	9	13	4	8	17			
FSV Optik Rathenow	15	17					11	16		18			17	14	19	18			
VfB Auerbach							14	7	12	9	12	11	9	9	15	19			
SV Tasmania Berlin																20			
Bischofswerdaer FV 08	12	16											16	17	20				
FSV Wacker 90 Nordhausen^{1}		11	12	17				5	3	3	7	2	3	13					
FC Oberlausitz Neugersdorf										5	8	12	15						
FSV Budissa Bautzen									13	13	17	14	18						
TSG Neustrelitz							8	1	8	8	18	17							
RB Leipzig II^{3}										11	3								
FC Schönberg 95^{4}										15	11								
Union Berlin II^{5}							12	4	10										
Energie Cottbus II							15												
Torgelower SV Greif							16												
Dresdner SC					13	2													
Sachsen Leipzig	2	6	9	4	14	6													
Eisenhüttenstädter FC Stahl	8	14	8	3	17	12													
VfL Halle 1896						14													
Tennis Borussia Berlin II						15													
Lok Altmark Stendal	16	8	11	9	12	16													
Spandauer SV	14	10	16	13	16														
SD Croatia Berlin					18														
Reinickendorfer Füchse	6	9	14	16															
SC Charlottenburg			17																
FSV Velten		15	18																
BSV Stahl Brandeburg	17																		
Türkiyemspor Berlin	18																		

- ^{1} Wacker Nordhausen withdrew for financial reasons at the end of the 2019–20 season.
- ^{2} Rot-Weiß Erfurt declared insolvency during the 2019–20 season and was automatically relegated.
- ^{3} RB Leipzig II was withdrawn from competition at the end of the 2016–17 season.
- ^{4} FC Schönberg withdrew from the league also for financial reasons at the end of the 2016–17 season.
- ^{5} 1. FC Union Berlin II was withdrawn from competition at the end of the 2014–15 season.
- ^{6} VFC Plauen also declared insolvency during the 2014–15 season and was automatically relegated.

=== Key ===
Symbol	Key
B	Bundesliga
2B	2. Bundesliga
3L	3. Liga
1	League champions
Place	League
Blank	Played at a league level below this league
RL	Played in one of the other Regionalligas
