= VfB Auerbach =

German association football club from Auerbach, Saxony

- Full name: Verein für Bewegungsspiele Auerbach 1906 e.V.
- Founded: 1906
- Ground: VfB Stadion
- Capacity: 5,000
- Chairman: Joachim Naumann
- Manager: Michael Hiemisch
- League: NOFV-Oberliga Süd (V)
- 2025–26: NOFV-Oberliga Süd, 4th of 16
Home colours	Away colours

VfB Auerbach is a German football club from the city of Auerbach, Saxony. The club also has a tennis department.

== History ==
The association was founded as the Auerbacher Fußball Club on 17 May 1906 making it the second-oldest side in Vogtland. They won their first title in the second class Gau Vogtland, part of the VMBV (Verband Mittledeutschland Ballspiel Verein or Federation of Central German Ballgame Clubs), in 1908. AFC was officially registered on 20 June 1913 and after World War I on 18 April 1919, with the introduction of departments for athletics, tennis, and winter sports re-made itself as the sportsclub VfB Auerbach 1906.

In the aftermath of World War II occupying Allied authorities ordered the dissolution of existing organizations in the country, including sports and football clubs. In the fall of 1945 the club was re-established as the football department of Sport- und Kultur-Kartell Auerbach i.V.. A new sportsclub known as BSG KWU Auerbach was created out of SuKK Auerbach in 1949 and renamed BSG Einheit Auerbach on 6 January 1951. BSG was an unheralded local side in and out of the lower division Berziksliga Karl-Marx-Stadt (today Chemnitz) in East Germany. In 1989, shortly before the end of the DDR-era BSG was the largest sports club in Auerbach with departments for bowling, boxing, fencing, gymnastics, hiking, roller skating, tennis, and table tennis.

The club returned to its roots after German re-unification when it was re-established as VfB Auerbach and continued to play in what was now the sixth division Bezirksliga Chemnitz. By the mid-90s they were playing in the Landesliga Sachsen (V), and after three second-place finishes (1996, 2001, 2002), finally captured the division title in 2003 to earn promotion to the NOFV-Oberliga Süd (IV). VfB played in the Oberliga for nine seasons, initially struggling but then achieving three runners-up finishes in its last four seasons there. The last of those, in 2012, qualified the team for the reformed Regionalliga Nordost, where it plays today.

== Current squad ==
As of 29 September 2021

Note: Flags indicate national team as defined under FIFA eligibility rules; some limited exceptions apply. Players may hold more than one non-FIFA nationality.

No.	Pos.	Nation	Player
1	GK	GER	Marius Kuhl
2	DF	GER	Niclas Kubitz
3	FW	GER	Lucas Seidel
4	DF	GRE	Sempastiano Giaouplari
5	FW	CZE	Tomas Kepl
6	MF	GER	Eric Stiller
7	MF	CZE	Ondrej Brejcha
8	MF	GER	Chris Vogel
11	MF	GER	Nico Donner
13	MF	GER	Maximilian Schmidt
15	MF	GER	Fabien Bochmann
16	DF	GER	Veit Kramer
17	DF	GER	Moritz Seidel

No.	Pos.	Nation	Player
18	MF	GER	Lennart Dietrich
21	DF	GER	Philipp Müller
25	MF	SYR	Sarwar Osse
27	MF	LBY	Mohand Almansori
28	FW	GER	Thomas Stock
30	GK	GER	Stefan Schmidt
32	DF	GER	Markus Möckel
33	FW	GER	Marc-Philipp Zimmermann
35	GK	GER	Maximilian Schlosser
44	MF	LVA	Aleksandrs Guzlajevs
55	DF	GER	Johann Weiß
80	FW	GRE	Michalis Frangos

== Honours ==
- NOFV-Oberliga Süd
  - Runners-up: 2009, 2011, 2012
- Landesliga Sachsen
  - Champions: 2003
  - Runners-up: 1996, 2001, 2002

== Stadium ==
The club plays in the VfB Stadion built in 1921. It has a capacity of 5,000 and after renovations features 750 seats (1993) and floodlighting (1995).
