= Marc Endres =

German professional footballer

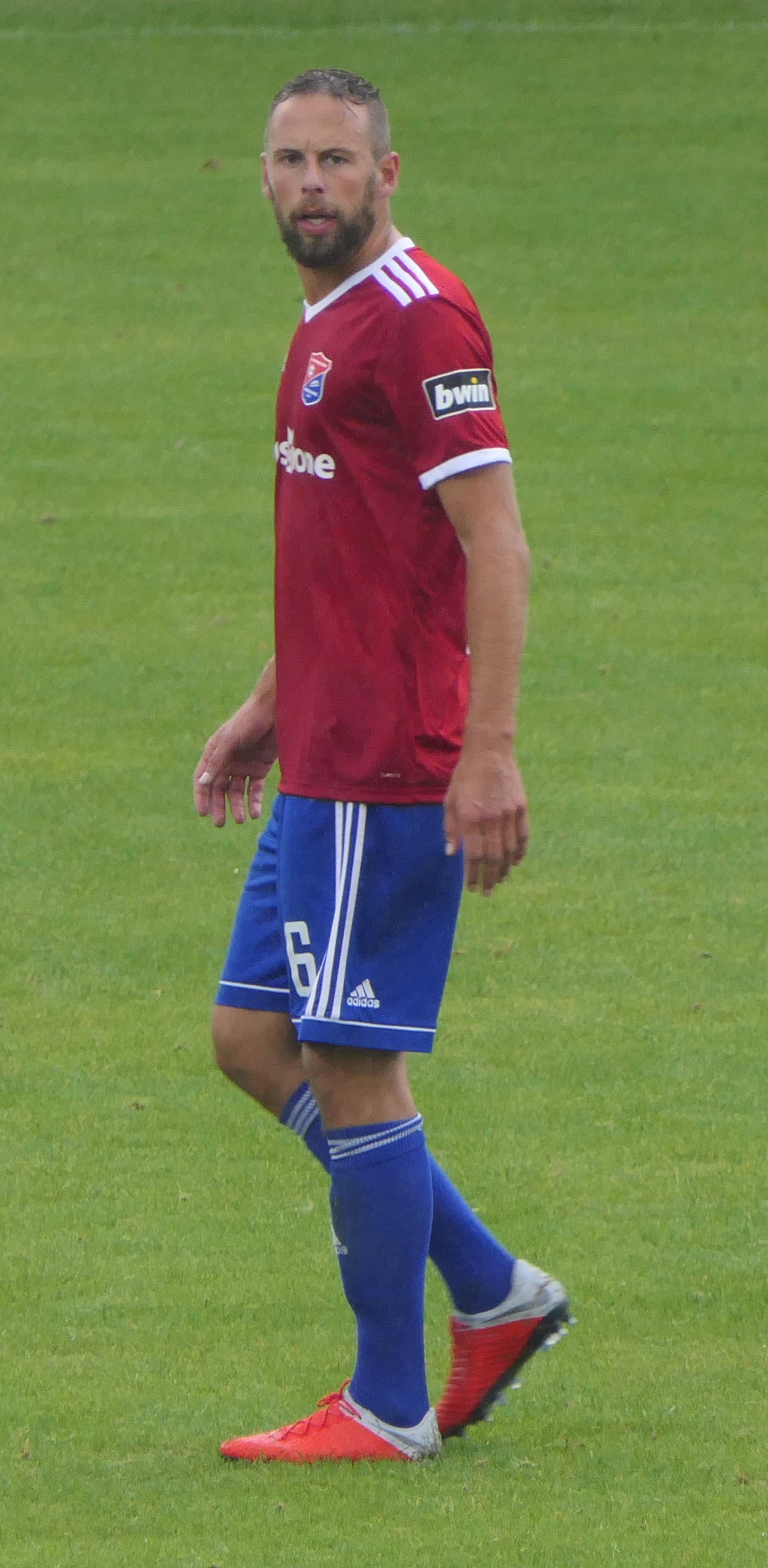
- Endres playing for SpVgg Unterhaching in 2018

Personal information
- Date of birth: 22 February 1991 (age 35)
- Place of birth: Friedrichshafen, Germany
- Height: 1.90 m (6 ft 3 in)
- Position: Centre-back

Team information
- Current team: TSV 1860 Rosenheim (manager)

Youth career
- SC Pfullendorf
- 2008–2010: SC Freiburg

Senior career*
Years	Team	Apps	(Gls)
2010–2012	SC Freiburg II	44	(5)
2012–2014	1. FC Heidenheim	17	(1)
2014–2018	Chemnitzer FC	104	(5)
2018–2021	SpVgg Unterhaching	36	(3)
Total		201	(14)

International career
2010–2011	Germany U-20	2	(0)

Managerial career
- 2021–: TSV 1860 Rosenheim
- * Club domestic league appearances and goals

Marc Endres (born 22 February 1991) is a German footballer, manager and former player who manages TSV 1860 Rosenheim.

== Career ==
On 13 May 2014, Endres signed a two-year contract with Chemnitzer FC.

In February 2021, he retired from playing due to injury problems. He became the new manager of Regionalliga Bayern club TSV 1860 Rosenheim.

== Honours ==
1. FC Heidenheim

- 3. Liga: 2013–14
- Württemberg Cup: 2013–14
