= Maximilian Drum =

German footballer (born 1991)

Personal information
- Full name: Maximilian Drum
- Date of birth: 19 September 1991 (age 35)
- Place of birth: Munich, Germany
- Height: 1.82 m (6 ft 0 in)
- Position: Central defender

Team information
- Current team: TSV Buchbach
- Number: 6

Youth career
- –2005: TSV 1860 München
- 2005–2009: SpVgg Unterhaching

Senior career*
Years	Team	Apps	(Gls)
2009–2012	SpVgg Unterhaching II	40	(3)
2011–2013	SpVgg Unterhaching	50	(1)
2013–2014	Wacker Burghausen	10	(0)
2014–	TSV Buchbach	41	(1)
- * Club domestic league appearances and goals as of 22 June 2016

Maximilian Drum (born 19 September 1991) is a German footballer who plays as a central defender for TSV Buchbach.

== Career ==
Drum joined SpVgg Unterhaching from 1860 Munich in 2005 and came through the youth team, making his debut in a 6–0 win in the 3. Liga against Carl Zeiss Jena in August 2011, as a substitute for Michael Stegmayer. He established himself as a regular in the first-team in the second half of the 2011–12 season. He signed for Wacker Burghausen in July 2013 along with team-mate Stephan Thee. After Burghausen were relegated to the Regionalliga Bayern at the end of the 2013–14 season, Drum left the club, joining TSV Buchbach of the same division.
