= Christoph Göbel =

German footballer

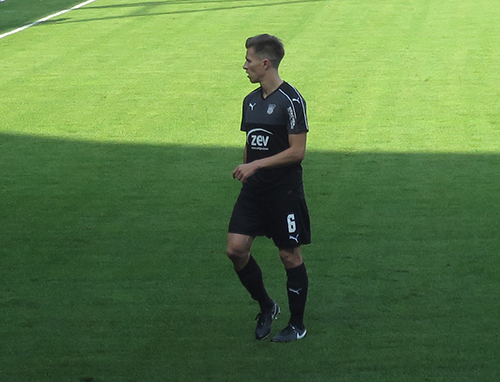

Personal information
- Full name: Christoph Göbel
- Date of birth: 23 March 1989 (age 37)
- Place of birth: Heilbad Heiligenstadt, East Germany
- Height: 1.75 m (5 ft 9 in)
- Position: Defender

Team information
- Current team: Wacker Nordhausen
- Number: 31

Youth career
- SV Eitech Pfaffschwende
- 2002–2008: Rot-Weiß Erfurt

Senior career*
Years	Team	Apps	(Gls)
2008–2010	Rot-Weiß Erfurt II	59	(7)
2008–2010	Rot-Weiß Erfurt	0	(0)
2010–2012	Sportfreunde Siegen	21	(3)
2012–2018	FSV Zwickau	161	(12)
2018–	Wacker Nordhausen	14	(0)
- * Club domestic league appearances and goals as of 23:47, 17 November 2018 (UTC)

Christoph Göbel (born 23 March 1989) is a German footballer who plays as a defender for Wacker Nordhausen.

== Club career ==
=== Rot-Weiss Erfurt ===
Göbel progressed through the Rot-Weiss Erfurt youth system. He made several appearances with the reserve side, but failed to make a first team appearance during his tenure there.

=== Sportfreunde Siegen ===
In July 2010, Göbel moved to Sportfreunde Siegen, arriving alongside Jörn Nowak. He made his league debut for the club on 27 August 2010 in a 3–0 victory over MSV Duisburg II. In May 2011, Göbel signed a one-year contract extension with the club.

=== FSV Zwickau ===
In July 2012, Göbel joined Regionalliga club FSV Zwickau on a free transfer. He made his league debut for the club on 3 October 2012 in a 0–0 home draw with Carl Zeiss Jena. He scored his first league goal for the club just four days later in a 3–0 home victory over Germania Halberstadt. His goal, scored in the 47th minute, made the score 2–0 to Zwickau. In May 2014, Göbel signed a two-year contract extension with the club. At the end of the 2017–18 season, Göbel's contract ran out and he left on a free transfer.

=== Wacker Nordhausen ===
On 6 June 2018, Göbel moved to Regionalliga side Wacker Nordhausen. He made his league debut for the club on 27 July 2018 in a 1–1 home draw with Hertha BSC II.

== Personal life ==
Christoph's brother, Patrick, is also a professional footballer, who plays for Würzburger Kickers.
