= Patrick Choroba =

German-Polish footballer (born 1996)

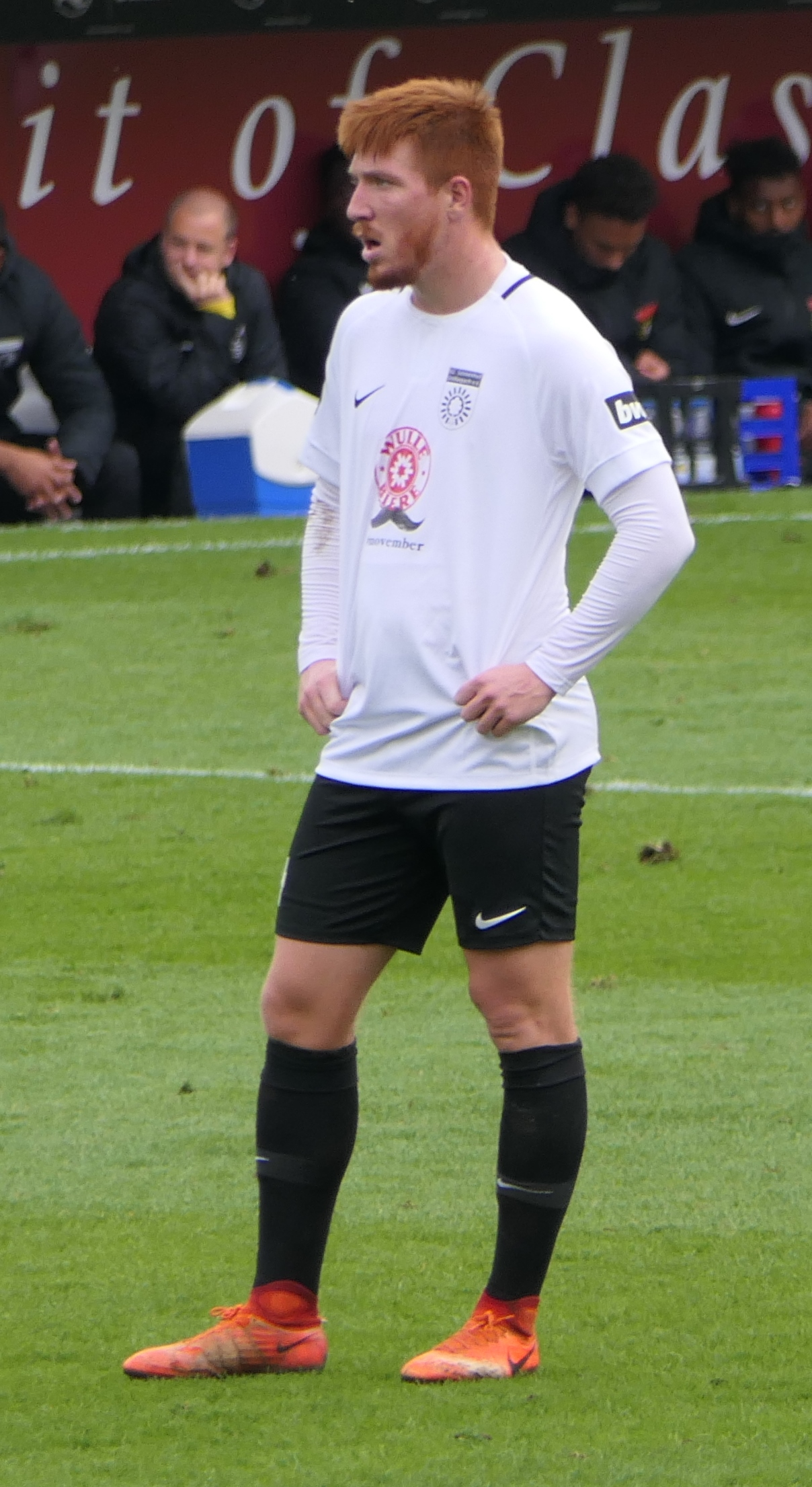
- Choroba in 2018

Personal information
- Date of birth: 11 June 1996 (age 30)
- Place of birth: Gütersloh, Germany
- Height: 1.83 m (6 ft 0 in)
- Position: Right-back

Team information
- Current team: SpVgg Hankofen-Hailing
- Number: 14

Youth career
- TuS Lipperreihe
- 2009–2015: SC Verl

Senior career*
| Years | Team | Apps | (Gls) |
| 2015–2018 | SC Verl | 65 | (6) |
| 2018–2019 | Sonnenhof Großaspach | 25 | (0) |
| 2019–2021 | SC Verl | 32 | (0) |
| 2021–2024 | SV Rödinghausen | 85 | (3) |
| 2024–2025 | SV Schalding-Heining | 30 | (3) |
| 2025– | SpVgg Hankofen-Hailing | 29 | (0) |
- * Club domestic league appearances and goals as of 28 June 2026

Patrick Choroba (born 11 June 1996) is a German-Polish professional footballer who plays as a right-back for Regionalliga Bayern club SpVgg Hankofen-Hailing.

== Career ==
A right-back, Choroba is the son of Wojciech Choroba, who made 82 appearances for FC Gütersloh in the 2. Bundesliga. He began his career at TuS Lipperreihe in Oerlinghausen and later moved to the youth department of SC Verl. After his youth career, he was promoted to the reserve team competing in Landesliga Westfalen, and from 2015 he played for the first team playing in the Regionalliga West. There, Choroba became a regular starter.

Choroba moved to 3. Liga club Sonnenhof Großaspach on 29 May 2018. He made his professional debut on 28 July 2018 in a 3–2 away loss to Carl Zeiss Jena. On 25 April 2019, Choroba was suspended until the end of the season for disciplinary reasons. On 2 July 2019, Choroba and Sonnenhof Großaspach agreed to terminate the contract by mutual consent, and he returned to SC Verl. He won promotion to the 3. Liga with the club in 2020.

On 14 April 2021, Choroba signed with Regionalliga West club SV Rödinghausen. Three years later, on 25 June 2024, Chorobo joined recently relegated Bayernliga club SV Schalding-Heining.
