= Herbert Paul (footballer) =

German footballer (born 1994)

Personal information
- Date of birth: 11 February 1994 (age 32)
- Place of birth: Ingolstadt, Germany
- Height: 1.86 m (6 ft 1 in)
- Position: Right-back

Team information
- Current team: FC Ingolstadt II
- Number: 26

Youth career
- 1999–2004: MTV Ingolstadt
- 2004–2010: FC Ingolstadt
- 2010–2012: Greuther Fürth

Senior career*
Years	Team	Apps	(Gls)
2012–2014	Greuther Fürth II	59	(2)
2014–2015	Bayern Munich II	19	(1)
2016–2018	1. FC Schweinfurt 05	53	(7)
2018–2020	1860 Munich	55	(3)
2020–2022	Austria Klagenfurt	28	(1)
2023	FC Pipinsried	9	(0)
2023–	FC Ingolstadt II	17	(1)
2023–	FC Ingolstadt	1	(0)

International career
2011	Germany U18	2	(0)

Managerial career
- 2022–2023: FC Pipinsried (player-manager)
- * Club domestic league appearances and goals as of 18:25, 18 December 2023 (UTC)

Herbert Paul (born 11 February 1994) is a German professional footballer who plays as a right-back for Bayernliga Nord club FC Ingolstadt 04 II.

== Club career ==
Paul began his career in the youth system of FC Ingolstadt before moving to the Greuther Fürth academy in the summer of 2010. After making his debut for Fürth's reserve team in senior competition, he transferred to the reserve team of Bayern Munich in the summer of 2014, playing in the Regionalliga Bayern.

Following the end of his contract with Bayern Munich, Paul was without a club for almost a year until joining 1. FC Schweinfurt 05 in the same league in the summer of 2016. After two seasons with Schweinfurt, he signed with 1860 Munich in the 3. Liga in the summer of 2018, where he made his professional debut on the first day of the season in a match against 1. FC Kaiserslautern.

Paul made 55 appearances in the 3. Liga over two seasons with 1860 Munich before leaving the club at the end of the 2019–20 season. He then signed a contract with SK Austria Klagenfurt, a second-division team in Austria, in October 2020. He played 15 matches for Klagenfurt in the 2020–21 season, helping the team gain promotion to the Austrian Bundesliga. He appeared in 11 matches in the top tier of Austrian football before suffering a torn anterior cruciate ligament in December 2021, which sidelined him for the rest of the season. Paul left Klagenfurt after the 2021–22 season.

In January 2023, Paul joined Regionalliga Bayern club FC Pipinsried as a player, after having already become the team's player coach in November 2022. After the club suffered relegation from the Regionalliga at the end of the season, Paul joined the second team of his youth club FC Ingolstadt 04 II, competing in the Bayernliga Nord.

== International career ==
Paul is a German youth international, having gained two caps for the national under-18s in 2011.

== Managerial career ==
On 22 December 2022, Paul was appointed the new head coach of FC Pipinsried after former coach Frank Peuker had quit after only five days in charge. Paul also continued as a player of the club. He left after the club suffered relegation to the Bayernliga Süd at the end of the season.

== Personal life ==
In an interview with tz from 2019, Herbert discussed how he struggled to find a team after his contract with Bayern Munich ended, leading to a period of unemployment. He uses meditation as a tool for mental preparation and self-reflection, something he began doing during his time with 1860 Munich to focus and stay calm under pressure.

== Career statistics ==
As of match played 11 November 2023

Appearances and goals by club, season and competition
Club	Season	League			DFB-Pokal		Other		Total	
Club	Season	Division	Apps	Goals	Apps	Goals	Apps	Goals	Apps	Goals
Greuther Fürth II	2012–13	Regionalliga Bayern	35	2	—		—		35	2
Greuther Fürth II	2013–14	Regionalliga Bayern	24	0	—		—		24	0
Greuther Fürth II	Total		59	2	0	0	0	0	59	2
Bayern Munich II	2014–15	Regionalliga Bayern	19	1	—		—		19	1
Bayern Munich II	2015–16	Regionalliga Bayern	0	0	—		—		0	0
Bayern Munich II	Total		19	1	0	0	0	0	19	1
1. FC Schweinfurt 05	2016–17	Regionalliga Bayern	27	3	—		—		27	3
1. FC Schweinfurt 05	2017–18	Regionalliga Bayern	26	4	2	0	—		28	4
1. FC Schweinfurt 05	Total		53	7	2	0	0	0	55	7
1860 Munich	2018–19	3. Liga	32	2	1	0	—		33	2
1860 Munich	2019–20	3. Liga	23	1	—		—		23	1
1860 Munich	Total		55	3	1	0	0	0	56	3
Austria Klagenfurt	2020–21	2. Liga	15	1	2	0	2 (Note: Appearances in Austrian Bundesliga promotion/relegation play-offs)	0	19	1
Austria Klagenfurt	2021–22	Austrian Bundesliga	11	0	3	0	—		14	0
Austria Klagenfurt	Total		26	1	5	0	2	0	33	1
FC Pipinsried	2022–23	Regionalliga Bayern	9	0	0	0	—		9	0
FC Ingolstadt 04 II	2023–24	Bayernliga Nord	17	1	—		—		17	1
FC Ingolstadt	2023–24	3. Liga	1	0	0	0	0	0	1	0
Career totals			239	15	8	0	2	0	249	15
