= Stephan Thee =

German footballer (born 1988)

Personal information
- Date of birth: 26 July 1988 (age 38)
- Place of birth: Munich, West Germany
- Height: 1.78 m (5 ft 10 in)
- Position: Right midfielder

Team information
- Current team: VfB Hallbergmoos
- Number: 28

Youth career
- FT Gern
- –2006: SpVgg Unterhaching

Senior career*
Years	Team	Apps	(Gls)
2006–2012	SpVgg Unterhaching II	82	(7)
2008–2013	SpVgg Unterhaching	67	(9)
2013–2014	Wacker Burghausen	34	(3)
2014–2016	VfL Osnabrück	33	(2)
2016–2017	TSV Buchbach	31	(2)
2018–2019	Türkgücü München	41	(2)
2019–2021	FC Pipinsried	16	(3)
2021–2022	VfR Garching	27	(3)
2022–	VfB Hallbergmoos	10	(0)
- * Club domestic league appearances and goals as of 12 November 2022

Stephan Thee (born 26 July 1988) is a German footballer who plays as a defensive midfielder for Bayernliga club VfB Hallbergmoos.

== Career ==
Thee came through SpVgg Unterhaching's youth team, and made his debut in a 3–2 win over VfR Aalen December 2008, replacing Anton Fink who had just completed his hat-trick. His next appearance didn't come until the 2010–11 season, over the next two years he became a regular in the Unterhaching first team. In July 2013 he moved to Wacker Burghausen, following his team-mate Maximilian Drum. After Burghausen were relegated from the 3. Liga at the end of the 2013–14 season, Thee signed for VfL Osnabrück.
