= Michael Schüler =

German footballer

Personal information
- Date of birth: 22 July 1997 (age 29)
- Place of birth: Adenau, Germany
- Height: 1.87 m (6 ft 2 in)
- Position: Centre-back

Team information
- Current team: SG Schneifel
- Number: 25

Youth career
- –2012: Bayer Leverkusen
- 2012–2016: 1. FC Köln

Senior career*
Years	Team	Apps	(Gls)
2016–2017	1. FC Köln II	16	(0)
2017–2018	TuS Koblenz	33	(2)
2018–2019	Carl Zeiss Jena	5	(0)
2018–2019	Carl Zeiss Jena II	6	(0)
2019–2021	TSV Steinbach	10	(0)
2021–	SG Schneifel	30	(5)
- * Club domestic league appearances and goals as of 18:37, 12 October 2023 (UTC)

Michael Schüler (born 22 July 1997) is a German footballer who plays as a centre-back for SG Schneifel.

== Career ==
Schüler made his professional debut for Carl Zeiss Jena in the 3. Liga on 12 November 2018, coming on as a substitute in the 70th minute for Fabien Tchenkoua in the 3–2 away win against Wehen Wiesbaden.
