= Johannes Brinkies =

German footballer

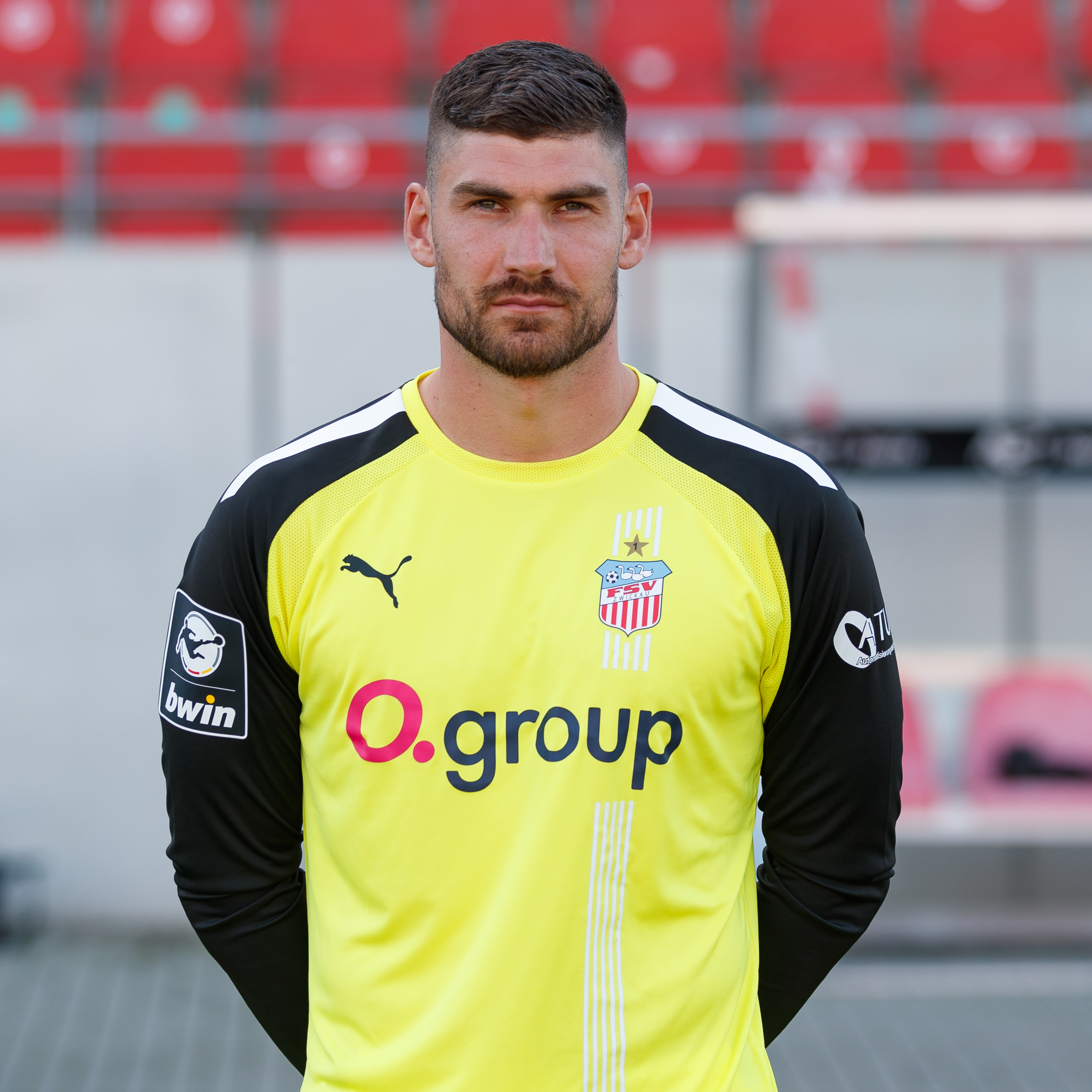

Personal information
- Date of birth: 20 June 1993 (age 33)
- Place of birth: Grevesmühlen, Mecklenburg-Vorpommern, Germany
- Height: 1.86 m (6 ft 1 in)
- Position: Goalkeeper

Team information
- Current team: Kickers Offenbach
- Number: 1

Youth career
- FC Anker Wismar
- Grevesmühlener FC
- –2011: Hansa Rostock

Senior career*
Years	Team	Apps	(Gls)
2011–2016	Hansa Rostock	38	(0)
2014–2016	→ Hansa Rostock II	7	(0)
2016–2023	FSV Zwickau	246	(0)
2023–	Kickers Offenbach	109	(0)

International career
2008	Germany U-16	1	(0)
2011	Germany U-19	1	(0)
- * Club domestic league appearances and goals as of 24 September 2026

Johannes Brinkies (born 20 June 1993) is a German footballer who plays for Kickers Offenbach.

== Club career ==
=== Hansa Rostock ===
A product of Hansa Rostock's youth academy, Brinkies made his league debut for the senior squad on 25 September 2012 in a 2–0 away victory over Stuttgart II.

=== Zwickau ===
In July 2016, Brinkies moved to 3. Liga club FSV Zwickau. He made his league debut for the club on 30 July 2016 in a 2–2 away draw with Mainz II. In September 2018, Brinkies suffered an inner ligament tear in his left knee, leaving him sidelined for six weeks, during a 1–1 draw in the league against Kaiserslautern.
