= Felix Brügmann =

German footballer

Personal information
- Date of birth: 30 November 1992 (age 33)
- Place of birth: Reinbek, Germany
- Height: 1.84 m (6 ft 0 in)
- Position: Forward

Youth career
- –2008: SSV Güster
- 2008–2009: SV Eichede
- 2009–2010: Eintracht Braunschweig

Senior career*
Years	Team	Apps	(Gls)
2010–2011	SV Eichede	24	(0)
2011–2012	SSV Güster		
2012–2013	Hamburger SV II	16	(5)
2013–2014	SSV Güster	20	(13)
2015–2016	Altona 93	43	(23)
2016–2017	Lokomotive Leipzig	33	(9)
2017–2018	Berliner AK	33	(15)
2018–2019	Carl Zeiss Jena	34	(8)
2019–2021	Energie Cottbus	37	(21)
2021–2022	VSG Altglienicke	20	(7)
2022–2023	Chemnitzer FC	47	(20)
2023–2024	SC Weiche Flensburg 08	27	(1)
- * Club domestic league appearances and goals as of 18 May 2024

Felix Brügmann (born 30 November 1992) is a German footballer who plays as a forward.

== Career ==
On 16 July 2019, Brügmann joined FC Energie Cottbus on a two-year contract.
