= Patrick Göbel =

German footballer (born 1993)

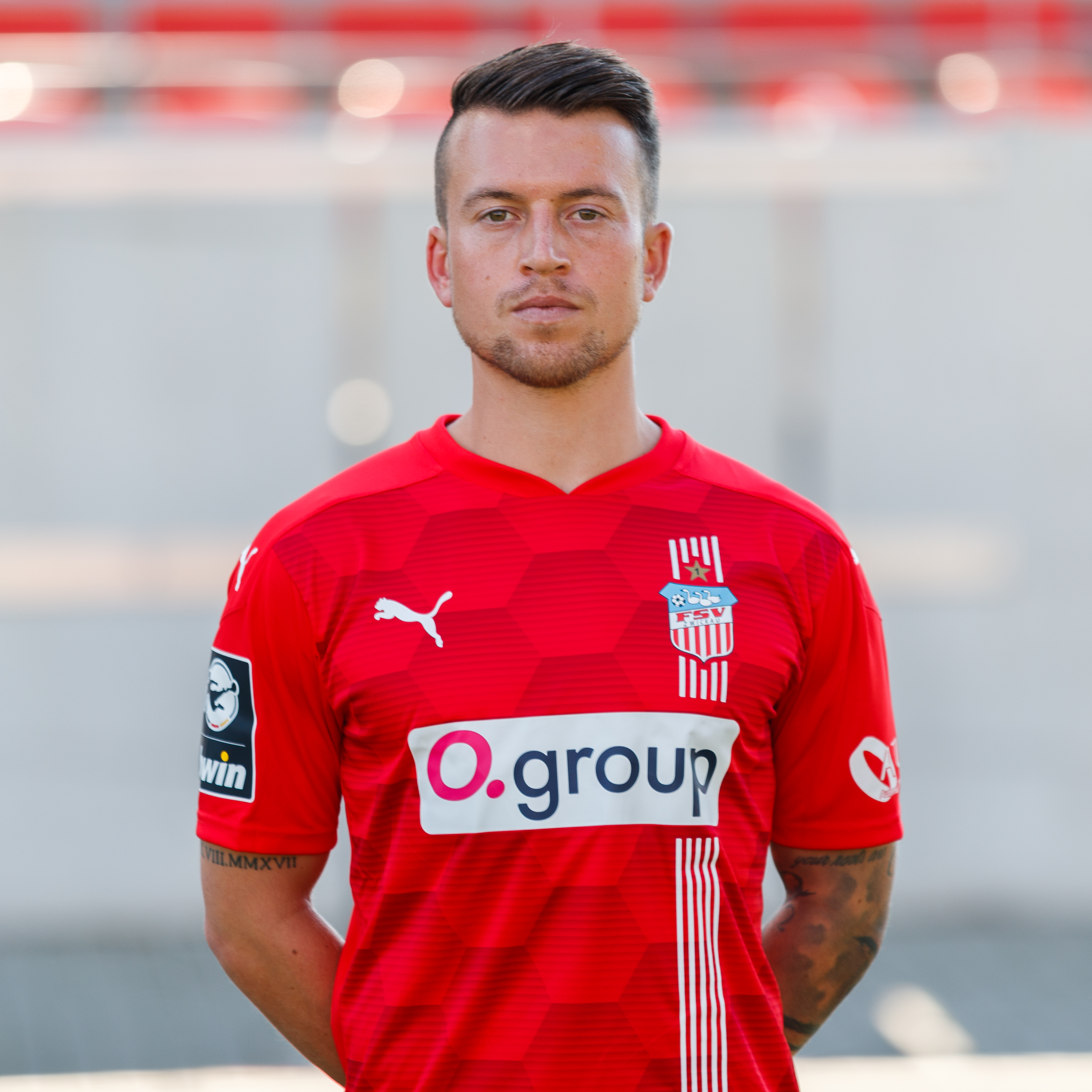
- Göbel in 2021

Personal information
- Date of birth: 8 July 1993 (age 33)
- Place of birth: Heilbad Heiligenstadt, Germany
- Height: 1.73 m (5 ft 8 in)
- Positions: Right midfielder; right-back

Team information
- Current team: Borussia Dortmund II
- Number: 17

Youth career
- SV Eitech Pfaffschwende
- Lengenfeld unterm Stein
- –2007: FC Union Mühlhausen
- 2007–2010: Rot-Weiß Erfurt

Senior career*
Years	Team	Apps	(Gls)
2010–2014	Rot-Weiß Erfurt II	33	(6)
2011–2014	Rot-Weiß Erfurt	40	(4)
2014–2017	FSV Zwickau	96	(12)
2017–2019	Würzburger Kickers	74	(8)
2019–2020	Hallescher FC	19	(3)
2020–2021	KFC Uerdingen 05	27	(0)
2021–2023	FSV Zwickau	64	(1)
2023–	Borussia Dortmund II	62	(1)
- * Club domestic league appearances and goals as of 16 May 2026

Patrick Göbel (born 8 July 1993) is a German professional footballer who plays as a right midfielder or right-back for Regionalliga West club Borussia Dortmund II.

== Personal life ==
He is the younger brother of fellow professional footballer Christoph Göbel.
