= Davy Frick =

German footballer

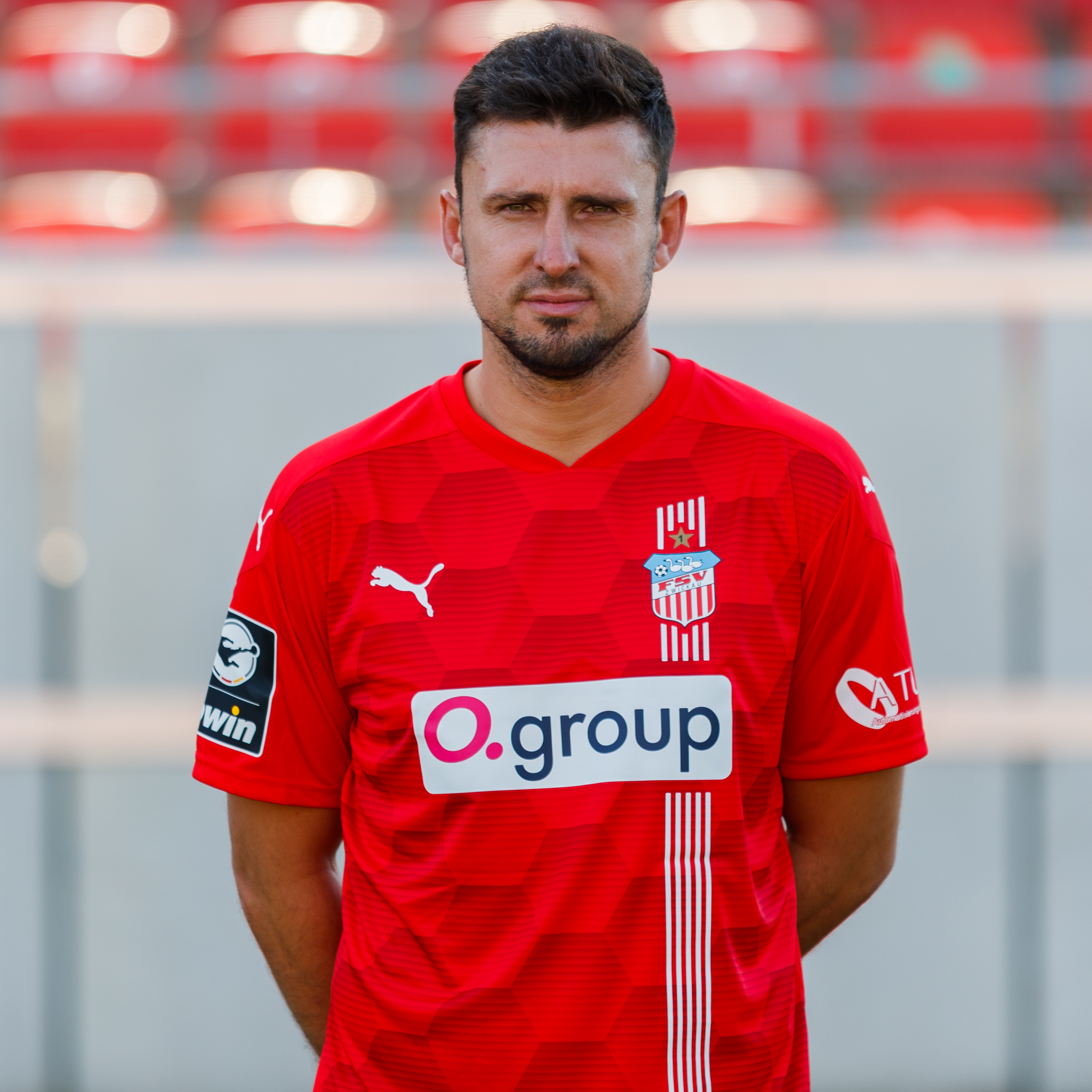
- Frick with FSV Zwickau in 2021

Personal information
- Date of birth: 5 April 1990 (age 36)
- Place of birth: Triptis, Bezirk Gera, East Germany
- Height: 1.86 m (6 ft 1 in)
- Position: Midfielder

Youth career
- 1999–2007: Grün-Weiß Triptis
- 2007–2009: Carl Zeiss Jena

Senior career*
Years	Team	Apps	(Gls)
2009–2011	Carl Zeiss Jena II	50	(5)
2010–2011	Carl Zeiss Jena	1	(0)
2011–2024	FSV Zwickau	394	(43)
- * Club domestic league appearances and goals

Davy Frick (born 5 April 1990) is a German former footballer who played as a midfielder.

== Career ==
Born in Triptis, Frick made his professional debut in the German 3. Liga with FSV Zwickau against Dynamo Dresden on 31 July 2010. In Zwickau's last home match of the 2023–24 season, in May 2024, he was given a farewell ahead of his retirement from playing.
