= Alexander Sorge =

German footballer (born 1993)

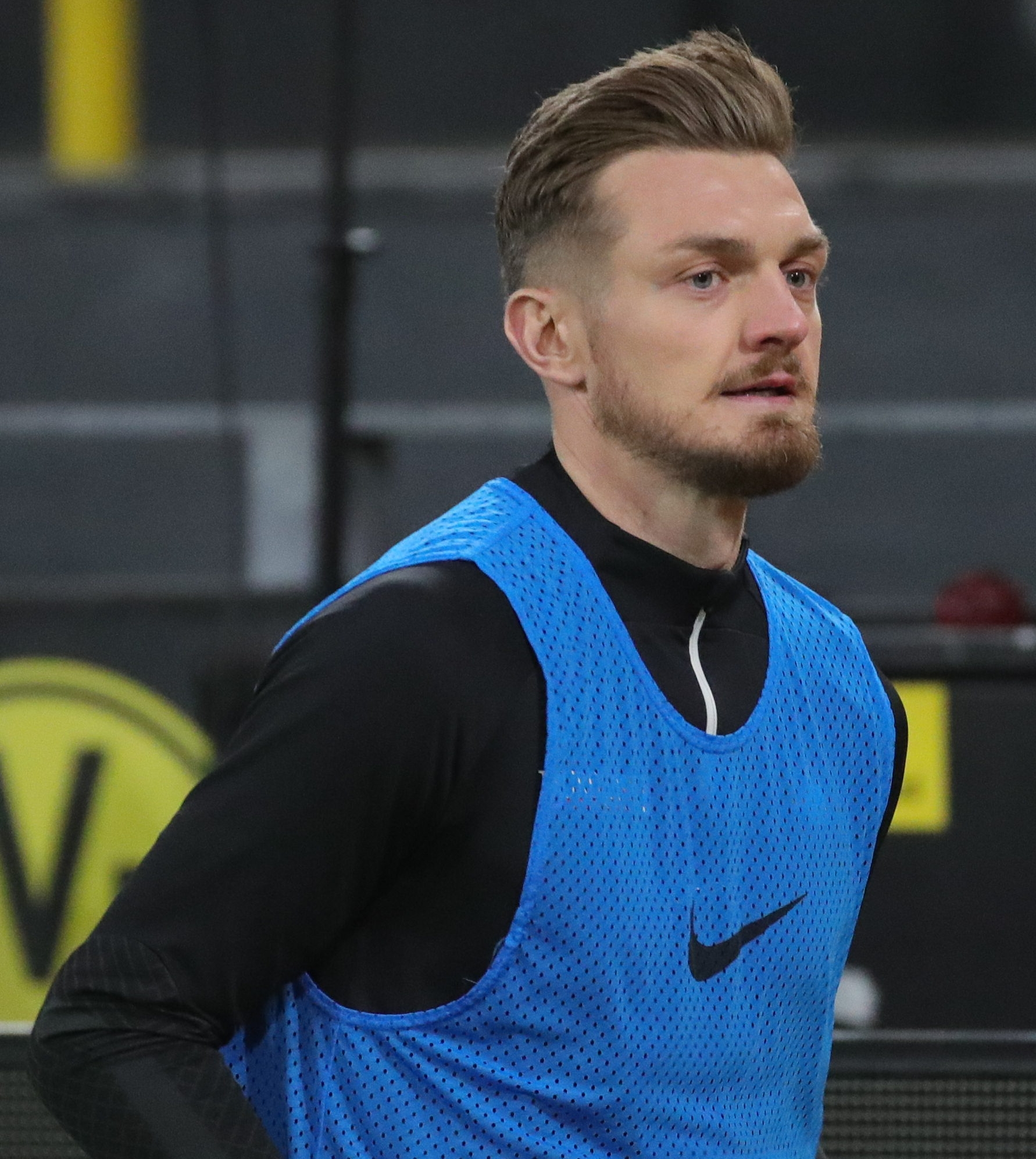
- Sorge in 2022

Personal information
- Date of birth: 21 April 1993 (age 33)
- Place of birth: Leipzig, Germany
- Height: 1.92 m (6 ft 4 in)
- Position: Centre-back

Team information
- Current team: Kickers Offenbach
- Number: 5

Youth career
- –2005: Lipsia Eutritzsch
- 2005–2009: Sachsen Leipzig
- 2009–2012: RB Leipzig

Senior career*
Years	Team	Apps	(Gls)
2012–2016	RB Leipzig II	112	(11)
2016–2019	FSV Zwickau	16	(0)
2019–2022	Türkgücü München	69	(5)
2022–2023	Erzgebirge Aue	26	(0)
2023–2025	Kickers Offenbach	43	(1)
2025–2026	Wacker Burghausen	16	(2)
2026–	Kickers Offenbach	2	(0)
- * Club domestic league appearances and goals as of 24 September 2026

Alexander Sorge (born 21 April 1993) is a German professional footballer who plays as a centre-back for Regionalliga club Kickers Offenbach.

== Career ==
In summer 2018, FSV Zwickau decided not to renew Sorge's contract after he suffered two severe, career-threatening knee injuries. In August, however, after his recovery he received a new season-long deal.

On 2 June 2022, Sorge signed a two-year contract with 3. Liga club Erzgebirge Aue, after his former club Türkgücü München had been relegated after filing for insolvency.

On 1 September 2023, Sorge moved to Kickers Offenbach.
