= Marc-Philipp Zimmermann =

German footballer

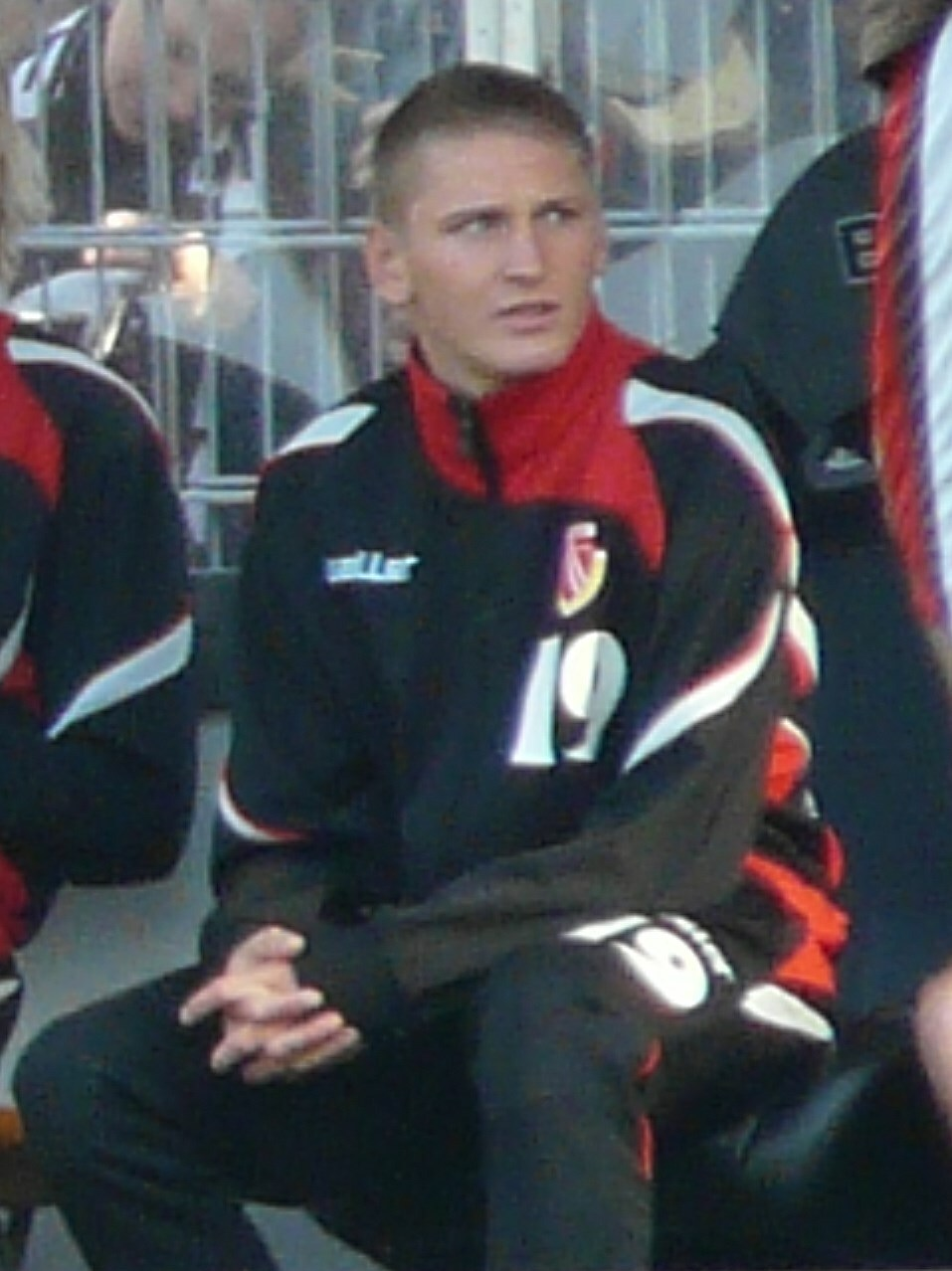
- Zimmermann with Energie Cottbus in 2009

Personal information
- Date of birth: 22 February 1990 (age 36)
- Place of birth: Spremberg, Germany
- Height: 1.78 m (5 ft 10 in)
- Position: Forward

Team information
- Current team: FSV Treuen

Youth career
- 1996–2003: Grün-Weiß Weißwasser
- 2003–2008: Energie Cottbus

Senior career*
Years	Team	Apps	(Gls)
2008–2011	Energie Cottbus II	81	(15)
2008–2011	Energie Cottbus	1	(0)
2011–2013	VFC Plauen	54	(21)
2013–2014	Carl Zeiss Jena	17	(2)
2014–2017	FSV Zwickau	64	(21)
2017–2023	VfB Auerbach	174	(95)
2023–2026	FSV Zwickau	66	(24)
2026–	FSV Treuen	0	(0)

International career
2008	Germany U18	1	(0)
- * Club domestic league appearances and goals as of 4 July 2026

Marc-Philipp Zimmermann (born 22 March 1990) is a German professional footballer who plays as a forward for FSV Zwickau.
