= Felix Geisler =

German footballer

Personal information
- Date of birth: 20 March 1997 (age 29)
- Place of birth: Luckau, Germany
- Height: 1.68 m (5 ft 6 in)
- Position: Midfielder

Team information
- Current team: VfB Krieschow
- Number: 10

Youth career
- –2010: Blau-Weiß Vetschau
- 2011–2016: Energie Cottbus

Senior career*
Years	Team	Apps	(Gls)
2016	Energie Cottbus	6	(0)
2016–2017	FSV Zwickau	3	(0)
2017–2021	Energie Cottbus	55	(5)
2021–	VfB Krieschow	26	(9)
- * Club domestic league appearances and goals as of 12 November 2022

Felix Geisler (born 20 March 1997) is a German footballer who plays as a midfielder for NOFV-Oberliga Nord club VfB Krieschow.
