= 2017–18 SC Paderborn 07 season =

SC Paderborn
2017–18 season
- Chairman: Wilfried Finke
- Manager: Steffen Baumgart
- Stadium: Benteler-Arena
- 3. Liga: 2nd
- DFB-Pokal: Quarter-finals
- Westphalian Cup: Semi-finals
Home colours	Away colours	Third colours
- All statistics correct as of 28 January 2018.

The 2017–18 SC Paderborn 07 season was the 33rd season in the football club's history. The season covered a period from 1 July 2017 to 30 June 2018.

== Players ==
=== Squad information ===
As of 14 April 2018

Note: Flags indicate national team as defined under FIFA eligibility rules; some limited exceptions apply. Players may hold more than one non-FIFA nationality.

No.	Pos.	Nation	Player
1	GK	GER	Michael Ratajczak
4	MF	CAN	Massih Wassey
5	DF	GER	Christian Strohdiek
6	MF	AUT	Sebastian Wimmer
7	FW	GER	Marlon Ritter (on loan from Fortuna Düsseldorf)
9	FW	AUS	Kwame Yeboah (on loan from Borussia Mönchengladbach)
11	FW	GER	Sven Michel
12	DF	GER	Felix Herzenbruch
13	DF	GER	Sebastian Schonlau
14	MF	GER	Thomas Bertels
15	FW	GER	Phillip Tietz
16	MF	ALB	Dardan Karimani
17	GK	GER	Leopold Zingerle
19	DF	GER	Marc Vucinovic

No.	Pos.	Nation	Player
20	DF	GER	Pascal Itter
21	MF	GER	Philipp Klement
22	MF	GHA	Christopher Antwi-Adjei
23	MF	GER	Robin Krauße
24	MF	GER	Fatih Ufuk
26	MF	GER	Ron Schallenberg
27	DF	GER	Matthias Stingl
28	GK	GER	Till Brinkmann
29	DF	NGR	Jamilu Collins
30	DF	GER	Leon Fesser
31	MF	GER	Ben Zolinski
32	MF	GER	Darryl Geurts
33	DF	GER	Lukas Boeder
—	FW	GER	Tim Mannek

== Friendly matches ==
Win Draw Loss

15 July 2017	(Germany) SC Paderborn	0–1	(Germany) Schalke 04	Paderborn
14:00		Summary		Stadium: Benteler-Arena

== Competitions ==
Win Draw Loss

=== 3. Liga ===
==== League table ====
Pos	Team	Pld	W	D	L	GF	GA	GD	Pts	Promotion, qualification or relegation
1	1. FC Magdeburg (C, P)	38	27	4	7	70	32	+38	85	Promotion to 2. Bundesliga and qualification for DFB-Pokal
2	SC Paderborn (P)	38	25	8	5	90	33	+57	83	Promotion to 2. Bundesliga and qualification for DFB-Pokal
3	Karlsruher SC	38	19	12	7	49	29	+20	69	Qualification for promotion play-offs and DFB-Pokal
4	Wehen Wiesbaden	38	21	5	12	76	39	+37	68	Qualification for DFB-Pokal
5	Würzburger Kickers	38	17	10	11	53	46	+7	61	

Source: DFB
Rules for classification: 1) Points; 2) Goal difference; 3) Goals scored
(C) Champions; (P) Promoted

==== Results summary ====
Overall								Home						Away					
Pld	W	D	L	GF	GA	GD	Pts	W	D	L	GF	GA	GD	W	D	L	GF	GA	GD
22	16	2	4	54	24	+30	50	10	1	1	34	8	+26	6	1	3	20	16	+4

Last updated: 27 January 2018.

==== Results by round ====
Matchday	1	2	3	4	5	6	7	8	9	10	11	12	13	14	15	16	17	18	19	20	21	22	23	24	25	26	27	28	29	30	31	32	33	34	35	36	37	38
Ground	A	H	A	H	A	H	A	H	A	H	A	H	H	A	H	A	H	A	H	H	A	H	A	H	A	H	A	H	A	H	A	A	H	A	H	A	H	A
Result	D	W	W	W	W	W	W	W	L	W	W	W	W	L	W	W	L	L	W	D	W	W																
Position	1	1	1	1	1	1	1	1	1	1	1	1	1	1	1	1	1	1	1	2	1	1																

Updated to match(es) played on 27 January 2018. Source:
A = Away; H = Home; W = Win; D = Draw; L = Loss

==== Matches ====
22 July 2017 Match 1	Hallescher FC	4–4	SC Paderborn	Halle (Saale)
14:00	Pintol 1' (pen.); Slišković (yellow card) 30' (goal) 74'; Schilk (yellow card) 58'; Ajani (yellow card) 69'; El-Helwe 73'; Manu 84'	Report	Zolinski 5'; Vucinovic 18' (pen.); Srbeny 45' (yellow card) 56'; Michel 60'	Stadium: Erdgas Sportpark; Attendance: 6,507; Referee: (Germany) Felix Zwayer

29 July 2017 Match 2	SC Paderborn	3–2	Chemnitzer FC	Paderborn
14:00	Krauße 9'; Zolinski 45+1' (yellow card) 62'; Strohdiek 75'; Schonlau (yellow card) 77'	Report	Grote (yellow card) 46'; Hansch 48'; Mlynikowski (yellow card) 56'; Kluft 84'	Stadium: Benteler-Arena; Attendance: 6,181; Referee: (Germany) Rene Rohde

1 August 2017 Match 3	Sportfreunde Lotte	1–2	SC Paderborn	Lotte
19:00	Dej 32'; Langlitz (yellow card) 51'; Wendel (yellow card) 63'; Oesterhelweg (yellow card) 86'	Report	Michel 27'; Krauße (yellow card) 52'; Vucinovic (yellow card) 56'; Antwi-Adjej (yellow card) 59'; Geurts (yellow card) 77' van der Biezen 90'	Stadium: Frimo Stadion; Attendance: 2,578; Referee: (Germany) Matthias Jöllenbeck

5 August 2017 Match 4	SC Paderborn	5–0	Sonnenhof Großaspach	Paderborn
14:00	Wassey 25'; Srbeny (yellow card) 36' (goal) 64'; Zolinski 37' 43'; Michel 51'	Report		Stadium: Benteler-Arena; Attendance: 5,745; Referee: (Germany) Patrick Schult

19 August 2017 Match 5	Rot-Weiß Erfurt	0–1	SC Paderborn	Erfurt
14:00	Dabanlı (yellow card) 62'; Huth (yellow card) 65'; Razeek (yellow card) 68'; Biankadi (yellow card) 77'; Möckel (red card) 90'	Report	Wassey (yellow card) 15'; Michel 33'; Zolinski (yellow card) 57'; Schonlau (yellow card) 68'	Stadium: Steigerwaldstadion; Attendance: 3,631; Referee: (Germany) Markus Wollenweber

25 August 2017 Match 6	SC Paderborn	1–0	Meppen	Paderborn
19:00	Wassey 16' (pen.); Schonlau (yellow card) 36'; Krauße (yellow card) 79'; Bertels (yellow card) 83'	Report	Leugers (yellow card) 45+2'; Vidović (yellow card) 61'; Vržogić (yellow card) 78'	Stadium: Benteler-Arena; Attendance: 9,421; Referee: (Germany) Martin Thomsen

9 September 2017 Match 7	Würzburger Kickers	2–3	SC Paderborn	Würzburg
14:00	Mast (red card) 8'; Neumann (yellow card) 22' (goal) 84'; Ahlschwede (yellow card) 66'; Taffertshofer (yellow card) 66'	Report	Michel 14'; Krauße (yellow card) 52'; Srbeny 65' (pen.); Ritter (yellow card) 72' (goal) 85'	Stadium: flyeralarm Arena; Attendance: 5,107; Referee: (Germany) Tobias Welz

16 September 2017 Match 8	SC Paderborn	2–1	Preußen Münster	Paderborn
14:00	Bertels (yellow card) 19'; Wassey 67' 81' (pen.); Antwi-Adjej (yellow card) 80'	Report	Heinrich 29'; Rinderknecht (yellow card) 60'; Mai (yellow card) 80'	Stadium: Benteler-Arena; Attendance: 8,229; Referee: (Germany) Benjamin Cortus

19 September 2017 Match 9	1. FC Magdeburg	1–0	SC Paderborn	Magdeburg
19:00	Erdmann (yellow card) 23'; Schäfer (yellow card) 30'; Beck 62'; Rother (yellow card) 78'	Report	Herzenbruch (yellow card) 61'	Stadium: MDCC-Arena; Attendance: 16,826; Referee: (Germany) Benjamin Brand

22 September 2017 Match 10	SC Paderborn	2–1	Hansa Rostock	Paderborn
19:00	Bertels 38' (red card) 90+4'; Srbeny 88'	Report	Henning (yellow card) 33' (yellow-red card); Wannenwetsch 53'; Hüsing (yellow card) 90+2'; Väyrynen (red card) 90+3'	Stadium: Benteler-Arena; Attendance: 8,970; Referee: (Germany) Patrick Ittrich

1 October 2017 Match 11	FSV Zwickau	1–3	SC Paderborn	Zwickau
14:00	Wagner (yellow card) 13'; Antonitsch (yellow card) 15'; Lange 39'; Miatke (yellow card) 42'; Schröter (yellow card) 78'	Report	Michel 13' (yellow card) 38'; Strohdiek (yellow card) 45'; Krauße (yellow card) 54'; Schonlau (yellow card) 62' (goal) 79'; Srbeny 90+3' (pen.)	Stadium: Stadion Zwickau; Attendance: 4,630; Referee: (Germany) Nicolas Winter

14 October 2017 Match 12	SC Paderborn	7–1	Werder Bremen II	Paderborn
14:00	Srbeny 10'; Ritter 16'; Michel 20' 33' 46'; Schonlau 24'; Wassey 68'	Report	Rosin (yellow card) 23'; Kazior (yellow card) 36'; Käuper 54' (pen.)	Stadium: Benteler-Arena; Attendance: 6,563; Referee: (Germany) Florian Kornblum

21 October 2017 Match 13	SC Paderborn	3–0	Aalen	Paderborn
14:00	Wassey 10' (pen.); Collins (yellow card) 53'; Srbeny (yellow card) 61' (goal) 78'; Stingl (yellow card) 70'; Michel 87'	Report	Trianni (yellow card) 9'; Morys (yellow card) 12'; Welzmüller (yellow card) 41'; Rehfeldt (yellow card) 71'; Geyer (yellow card) 82'	Stadium: Benteler-Arena; Attendance: 6,357; Referee: (Germany) Felix Schwermer

28 October 2017 Match 14	Carl Zeiss Jena	3–1	SC Paderborn	Jena
14:00	Strohdiek 17' (o.g.); Grösch 22'; Sucsuz (yellow card) 24'; Cros (yellow card) 33'; Wolfram 64'; Brügmann (yellow card) 88'	Report	Ritter 63' (yellow card) 85'; Zolinski (yellow card) 72'	Stadium: Ernst-Abbe-Sportfeld; Attendance: 5,000; Referee: (Germany) Florian Badstübner

4 November 2017 Match 15	SC Paderborn	3–0	Osnabrück	Paderborn
14:00	Zolinski (yellow card) 22' (goal) 37' 63'; Ritter (yellow card) 43'; Krauße 61' van der Biezen (yellow card) 90'	Report	Groß (yellow card) 22'; Reimerink (yellow card) 43'; Arslan (yellow card) 50'	Stadium: Benteler-Arena; Attendance: 9,319; Referee: (Germany) Robert Hartmann (referee)

18 November 2017 Match 16	Unterhaching	0–3	SC Paderborn	Unterhaching
14:00	Hain (yellow card) 56'	Report	Ritter 11' (yellow card) 38' (goal) 67'; Krauße (yellow card) 27'; Herzenbruch (yellow card) 48'; Bertels 70'	Stadium: Sportpark Unterhaching; Attendance: 3,000; Referee: (Germany) Pascal Müller

24 November 2017 Match 17	SC Paderborn	0–2	Karlsruher SC	Paderborn
19:00	Michel (yellow card) 32'; Strohdiek (yellow card) 61'	Report	Marcel Mehlem (yellow card) 28' (goal) 61'; Schleusener 49'; Muslija (yellow card) 56'; Uphoff (yellow card) 74'; Stroh-Engel (yellow card) 77'	Stadium: Benteler-Arena; Attendance: 8,408; Referee: (Germany) Benedikt Kempkes

2 December 2017 Match 18	Wehen Wiesbaden	4–1	SC Paderborn	Wiesbaden
14:00	Breitkreuz (yellow card) 24'; Andrist 27'; Ruprecht 31' (yellow card) 41' (goal) 71' (pen.); Schäffler 56'; Andrich (yellow card) 87'	Report	Herzenbruch (yellow card) 70'; Strohdiek 79'; Michel (yellow card) 90+2'	Stadium: Brita-Arena; Attendance: 2,546; Referee: (Germany) Eric Müller

9 December 2017 Match 19	SC Paderborn	3–1	Fortuna Köln	Paderborn
14:00	Zolinski 28'; Krauße (yellow card) 32'; Wassey 43' (pen.); Srbeny 54'	Report	Boeder 30' (o.g.); Kessel (yellow card) 33'; Ernst (yellow card) 49'	Stadium: Benteler-Arena; Attendance: 7,762; Referee: (Germany) Bibiana Steinhaus

15 December 2017 Match 20	SC Paderborn	0–0	Hallescher FC	Paderborn
19:00	Wassey (yellow card) 47' van der Biezen (yellow card) 84'; Krauße (yellow card) 85'	Report	Schilk (yellow card) 71'; Landgraf (yellow card) 75'	Stadium: Benteler-Arena; Attendance: 5,431; Referee: (Germany) Michael Bacher

20 January 2018 Match 21	Chemnitzer FC	0–2	SC Paderborn	Chemnitz
14:00	Hansch (yellow card) 25'; Grote (yellow card) 43'; Aydın (yellow card) 73'	Report	Antwi-Adjei 31'; Srbeny 56'; Schonlau (yellow card) 66'	Stadium: community4you ARENA; Attendance: 5,300; Referee: (Germany) Tobias Fritsch

27 January 2018 Match 22	SC Paderborn	5–0	Sportfreunde Lotte	Paderborn
14:00	Herzenbruch (yellow card) 20'; Ritter 36' 50'; Zolinski 45'; Tietz 58'; Fesser 72'	Report	Pires-Rodrigues (yellow card) 8'; Rosinger (red card) 51'; Schulze (yellow card) 57'	Stadium: Benteler-Arena; Attendance: 8,046; Referee: (Germany) Robert Schröder

3 February 2018 Match 23	Sonnenhof Großaspach	v	SC Paderborn	Aspach, Baden-Württemberg
14:00				Stadium: Mechatronik Arena

10 February 2018 Match 24	SC Paderborn	v	Rot-Weiß Erfurt	Paderborn
				Stadium: Benteler-Arena

17 February 2018 Match 25	Meppen	v	SC Paderborn	Meppen
				Stadium: Hänsch-Arena

24 February 2018 Match 26	SC Paderborn	v	Würzburger Kickers	Paderborn
				Stadium: Benteler-Arena

3 March 2018 Match 27	Preußen Münster	v	SC Paderborn	Münster
				Stadium: Preußenstadion

7 March 2018 Match 28	SC Paderborn	v	1. FC Magdeburg	Paderborn
				Stadium: Benteler-Arena

10 March 2018 Match 29	Hansa Rostock	v	SC Paderborn	Rostock
				Stadium: Ostseestadion

17 March 2018 Match 30	SC Paderborn	v	Zwickau	Paderborn
				Stadium: Benteler-Arena

24 March 2018 Match 31	Werder Bremen II	v	SC Paderborn	Bremen
				Stadium: Weserstadion Platz 11

31 March 2018 Match 32	Aalen	v	SC Paderborn	Aalen
				Stadium: OSTALB ARENA

7 April 2018 Match 33	SC Paderborn	v	Carl Zeiss Jena	Paderborn
				Stadium: Benteler-Arena

14 April 2018 Match 34	Osnabrück	v	SC Paderborn	Osnabrück
				Stadium: Stadion an der Bremer Brücke

21 April 2018 Match 35	SC Paderborn	v	Unterhaching	Paderborn
				Stadium: Benteler-Arena

28 April 2018 Match 36	Karlsruher SC	v	SC Paderborn	Karlsruhe
				Stadium: Wildparkstadion

5 May 2018 Match 37	SC Paderborn	v	Wehen Wiesbaden	Paderborn
				Stadium: Benteler-Arena

12 May 2018 Match 38	Fortuna Köln	v	SC Paderborn	Cologne
				Stadium: Südstadion

=== DFB-Pokal ===
14 August 2017 Round 1	SC Paderborn	2–1	FC St Pauli	Paderborn
18:30	Zolinski (yellow card) 30'; Wassey 41'; Schonlau (yellow card) 73'; Antwi-Adjej 79'; Strohdiek (yellow card) 90+5'	Report	Allagui 90+1'	Stadium: Benteler-Arena; Attendance: 15,000; Referee: (Germany) Sven Jablonski

24 October 2017 Last 32	SC Paderborn	2–0	Bochum	Paderborn
18:30	Michel 7'; Zolinski (yellow card) 67'; Schonlau (yellow card) 77'; Wassey 85'	Report	Bastians (yellow card) 28'; Fabian (yellow card) 35'; Gyamerah (yellow card) 67' (yellow-red card); Stöger (yellow card) 72'; Diamantakos (yellow card) 79'	Stadium: Benteler-Arena; Attendance: 15,000; Referee: (Germany) Sascha Stegemann

19 December 2017 Last 16	SC Paderborn	1–0	FC Ingolstadt 04	Paderborn
18:30	Zolinski 56'; Boeder (yellow card) 66'; Krauße (yellow card) 90+2'	Report	Pledl (yellow card) 22'; Gaus (yellow card) 39'; Cohen (yellow card) 41'; Kittel (yellow card) 67'	Stadium: Benteler-Arena; Attendance: 14,800; Referee: (Germany) Felix Zwayer

6 February 2018 Quarter Final	SC Paderborn	v	Bayern Munich	Paderborn
18:30				Stadium: Benteler-Arena

=== Westphalian Cup ===
3 October 2017 Last 16	TuS Viktoria Rietberg	0–15	SC Paderborn	Rietberg
15:00		Summary		Stadium: Rasenplatz Berglage Rietberg

31 October 2017 Quarter Final	SC Herford	1–2	SC Paderborn	Herford
13:30		Report		Stadium: Friedrich-Ludwig-Jahn-Stadion
