= 2016–17 Sportfreunde Lotte season =

Sportfreunde Lotte
2016–17 season
- Chairman: Rolf Horstmann
- Manager: Ismail Atalan
- Stadium: Frimo Stadion
- 3. Liga: 3rd
- DFB-Pokal: Round 3
| Home colours | Away colours |
- All statistics correct as of October 26, 2016.

The 2016–17 Sportfreunde Lotte season is their first season in the 3. Liga.

== Events ==
Sportfreunde Lotte won promotion after beating SV Waldhof Mannheim in the 2015–16 Regionalliga promotion play-offs.

== Transfers ==
=== In ===
| No. | Pos. | Name | Age | Moving from | Type | Transfer Window | Contract ends | Transfer fee | Ref. |
|---|---|---|---|---|---|---|---|---|---|
| 1 | GK | (Germany) David Buchholz | 42 | FC Homburg | Transfer | Summer | | | |
| 31 | MF | (Germany) Marcel Kaffenberger | 32 | Chemnitzer FC | Transfer | Summer | | | |
| 22 | DF | (Germany) Dennis Engel | 31 | VfB Oldenburg | Transfer | Summer | | | |
| 21 | DF | (Germany) Phillipp Steinhart | 34 | Bayern Munich II | Transfer | Summer | | | |
| 33 | GK | (Germany) Yannick Zummack | 30 | Eintracht Frankfurt | Transfer | Summer | | | |
| 24 | MF | (Poland) Jarosław Lindner | 38 | SV Wehen Wiesbaden | Transfer | Summer | | | |
| 14 | MF | (Poland) Patrick Schikowski | 34 | Rot-Weiß Erfurt | Transfer | Summer | | | |

=== Out ===
| No. | Pos. | Name | Age | Moving to | Type | Transfer Window | Transfer fee | Ref. |
|---|---|---|---|---|---|---|---|---|
| 1 | GK | (Germany) Dominik Bergdorf | 33 | Offenburger FV | Transfer | Summer | | |
| 25 | DF | (Germany) Jeron Al-Hazaimeh | 34 | Preußen Münster | Transfer | Summer | | |
| 34 | MF | (Germany) Benjamin Siegert | 45 | Tennis Borussia Berlin | Transfer | Summer | | |
| 13 | FW | (Germany) Daniel Latkowski | 35 | SC Wiedenbrück | Transfer | Summer | | |

== Preseason and friendlies ==
Win Draw Loss Postponed

| 28 June 2016 | (Germany) SC Wiedenbrück 2000 | 4–1 | (Germany) Sportfreunde Lotte |
| 19:00 | | Report |

| 19 July 2016 | (Netherlands) Heracles Almelo | 2–0 | (Germany) Sportfreunde Lotte |
| 19:00 | | Report |

| 11 January 2017 | (Germany) SC Wiedenbrück 2000 | 4–2 | (Germany) Sportfreunde Lotte |
| 19:00 | | Report |

| 19 January 2017 | (Germany) Wuppertaler SV | 1–1 | (Germany) Sportfreunde Lotte |
| 12:45 | | Report |

| 21 January 2017 | (Germany) Hannover 96 | 4–1 | (Germany) Sportfreunde Lotte |
| 15:00 | | Report |

== 3. Liga ==
=== 3. Liga fixtures & results ===
Win Draw Loss Postponed

| MD | Date Kickoff^{A} | H/A | Opponent | Res.^{B} F–A | Att. | Goalscorers | | Table | | Ref. |
| MD | Date Kickoff^{A} | H/A | Opponent | Res.^{B} F–A | Att. | Sportfreunde Lotte | Opponent | Pos. | Pts. | Ref. |
|---|---|---|---|---|---|---|---|---|---|---|
| 1 | | | | – | | | | | | |
| 2 | | | | – | | | | | | |
| 3 | | | | – | | | | | | |
| 4 | | | | – | | | | | | |
| 5 | | | | – | | | | | | |
| 6 | | | | – | | | | | | |
| 8 | | | | – | | | | | | |
| 7 | | | | – | | | | | | |
| 9 | | | | – | | | | | | |
| 10 | | | | – | | | | | | |
| 11 | | | | – | | | | | | |
| 12 | | | | – | | | | | | |
| 13 | | | | – | | | | | | |
| 14 | | | | – | | | | | | |
| 15 | | | | – | | | | | | |
| 16 | | | | – | | | | | | |
| 17 | | | | – | | | | | | |
| 18 | | | | – | | | | | | |
| 19 | | | | – | | | | | | |
| 20 | | | | – | | | | | | |
| 21 | | | | – | | | | | | |
| 22 | | | | – | | | | | | |
| 23 | | | | – | | | | | | |
| 24 | | | | – | | | | | | |
| 25 | | | | – | | | | | | |
| 26 | | | | – | | | | | | |
| 27 | | | | – | | | | | | |
| 28 | | | | – | | | | | | |
| 29 | | | | – | | | | | | |
| 30 | | | | – | | | | | | |
| 31 | | | | – | | | | | | |
| 32 | | | | – | | | | | | |
| 33 | | | | – | | | | | | |
| 34 | | | | – | | | | | | |
| 35 | | | | – | | | | | | |
| 36 | | | | – | | | | | | |
| 37 | | | | – | | | | | | |
| 38 | | | | – | | | | | | |

=== League table ===
| Pos | Team | Pld | W | D | L | GF | GA | GD | Pts |
|---|---|---|---|---|---|---|---|---|---|
| 10 | Sonnenhof Großaspach | 38 | 14 | 9 | 15 | 48 | 48 | 0 | 51 |
| 11 | VfR Aalen (Note: On 10 March 2017, VfR Aalen was deducted nine points for filing in for insolvency. On 15 March 2017, Aalen objected the decision. The DFB rejected the appeal on 24 March 2017. After Aalen again appealed the decision, it was rejected once more on 11 April 2017. On 4 May 2017, the DFB rejected the next appeal from Aalen. It was again denied on 18 May 2017.) | 38 | 14 | 15 | 9 | 52 | 36 | +16 | 48 |
| 12 | Sportfreunde Lotte | 38 | 13 | 9 | 16 | 46 | 47 | −1 | 48 |
| 13 | Hallescher FC | 38 | 10 | 18 | 10 | 34 | 39 | −5 | 48 |
| 14 | Rot-Weiß Erfurt | 38 | 12 | 11 | 15 | 34 | 47 | −13 | 47 |

Source: DFB
Rules for classification: 1) Points; 2) Goal difference; 3) Goals scored

== Westphalian Cup ==
=== Westphalian Cup results ===
Win Draw Loss Postponed

| 9 November 2016 Last 16 | Schüren | 1–2 | Sportfreunde Lotte | Dortmund |
| 19:00 | | Report | | Stadium: Sportplatz Schüren |

| 12 April 2017 Quarter Final | FC Gütersloh 2000 | 0–2 | Sportfreunde Lotte | Gütersloh |
| 19:00 | | Report | | Stadium: Heidewaldstadion |

| 26 April 2017 Semi Final | Sportfreunde Lotte | 0–0 (a.e.t.) (5–3 p) | SV Rödinghausen | Lotte, Germany |
| 19:00 | | Report | | Stadium: Frimo Stadion |

| 25 May 2017 Final | Paderborn | 3–1 | Sportfreunde Lotte | Paderborn |
| 17:00 | | Report | | Stadium: Sportpark Breite Bruch |

== Player information ==
As of 31 May 2016.

| No. | Pos | Nat | Player | Total | | 3. Liga | | Westphalian Cup | |
| No. | Pos | Nat | Player | Apps | Goals | Apps | Goals | Apps | Goals |
|---|---|---|---|---|---|---|---|---|---|
| 1 | GK | (Germany) GER | David Buchholz | 0 | 0 | 0 | 0 | 0 | 0 |
| 3 | DF | (Germany) GER | Tim Wendel | 0 | 0 | 0 | 0 | 0 | 0 |
| 4 | DF | (Germany) GER | Gerrit Nauber | 0 | 0 | 0 | 0 | 0 | 0 |
| 5 | DF | (Germany) GER | Matthias Rahn | 0 | 0 | 0 | 0 | 0 | 0 |
| 6 | MF | (Germany) GER | Tim Gorschlüter | 0 | 0 | 0 | 0 | 0 | 0 |
| 7 | DF | (Germany) GER | Alexander Hettich | 0 | 0 | 0 | 0 | 0 | 0 |
| 8 | MF | (Poland) POL | André Dej | 0 | 0 | 0 | 0 | 0 | 0 |
| 9 | FW | (Turkey) TUR | Semih Daglar | 0 | 0 | 0 | 0 | 0 | 0 |
| 10 | MF | (Germany) GER | Bernd Rosinger | 0 | 0 | 0 | 0 | 0 | 0 |
| 11 | FW | (Germany) GER | Luka Tankulić | 0 | 0 | 0 | 0 | 0 | 0 |
| 14 | MF | (Germany) GER | Patrick Schikowski | 0 | 0 | 0 | 0 | 0 | 0 |
| 15 | MF | (Germany) GER | Moritz Heyer | 0 | 0 | 0 | 0 | 0 | 0 |
| 16 | DF | (Germany) GER | Nico Neidhart | 0 | 0 | 0 | 0 | 0 | 0 |
| 17 | MF | (Germany) GER | Nico Granatowski | 0 | 0 | 0 | 0 | 0 | 0 |
| 19 | MF | (Germany) GER | Kevin Freiberger | 0 | 0 | 0 | 0 | 0 | 0 |
| 20 | MF | (Portugal) POR | Kevin Pires-Rodrigues | 0 | 0 | 0 | 0 | 0 | 0 |
| 21 | DF | (Germany) GER | Phillipp Steinhart | 0 | 0 | 0 | 0 | 0 | 0 |
| 22 | DF | (Germany) GER | Dennis Engel | 0 | 0 | 0 | 0 | 0 | 0 |
| 23 | DF | (Germany) GER | Alexander Langlitz | 0 | 0 | 0 | 0 | 0 | 0 |
| 24 | MF | (Poland) POL | Jarosław Lindner | 0 | 0 | 0 | 0 | 0 | 0 |
| 27 | MF | (Germany) GER | Dennis Brock | 0 | 0 | 0 | 0 | 0 | 0 |
| 30 | MF | (Germany) GER | Benedikt Fernandez | 0 | 0 | 0 | 0 | 0 | 0 |
| 31 | MF | (Germany) GER | Marcel Kaffenberger | 0 | 0 | 0 | 0 | 0 | 0 |
| 33 | DF | (Germany) GER | Yannick Zummack | 0 | 0 | 0 | 0 | 0 | 0 |

== Notes ==
A. Kickoff time in Central European Time/Central European Summer Time.
B. Sportfreunde Lotte goals first.
