= 2015–16 Bayer 04 Leverkusen season =

Bayer 04 Leverkusen
2015–16 season
- Sporting director: Rudi Völler
- Manager: Roger Schmidt
- Stadium: BayArena
- Bundesliga: 3rd
- DFB-Pokal: Quarter-finals
- Champions League: Group stage
- Europa League: Round of 16
- Top goalscorer: League: Javier Hernández (17); All: Javier Hernández (26)
| Home colours | Away colours | Third colours |

The 2015–16 Bayer 04 Leverkusen season was the 112th season in the club's football history.

The season was the first since 2004–05 without Simon Rolfes, who retired after the 2014–15 season.

== Transfers ==
=== In ===
| No. | Pos. | Nat. | Name | Age | EU | Moving from | Type | Transfer window | Ends | Transfer fee | Source |
|---|---|---|---|---|---|---|---|---|---|---|---|
| 2 | DF | (Brazil) | André Ramalho | 23 | Non-EU | Red Bull Salzburg (Austria) | Transfer | Summer | 2019 | Free | |
| 14 | FW | (Switzerland) | Admir Mehmedi | 24 | EU | SC Freiburg | Transfer | Summer | 2019 | €8,000,000 | |
| 5 | DF | (Greece) | Kyriakos Papadopoulos | 23 | EU | Schalke 04 | Transfer | Summer | 2020 | €6,500,000 | |
| 4 | DF | (Germany) | Jonathan Tah | 19 | EU | Hamburger SV | Transfer | Summer | 2020 | €7,500,000 | |
| 20 | MF | (Chile) | Charles Aránguiz | 26 | Non-EU | Internacional (Brazil) | Transfer | Summer | 2020 | €13,000,000 | |
| 44 | MF | (Slovenia) | Kevin Kampl | 24 | EU | Borussia Dortmund | Transfer | Summer | | €11,000,000 | |
| 7 | FW | (Mexico) | Javier Hernández | 27 | Non-EU | Manchester United (England) | Transfer | Summer | 2018 | €12,000,000 | |

=== Out ===
| No. | Pos. | Nat. | Name | Age | EU | Moving to | Type | Transfer window | Transfer fee | Source |
|---|---|---|---|---|---|---|---|---|---|---|
| | MF | (Germany) | Gonzalo Castro | 28 | EU | Borussia Dortmund | Transfer | Summer | €11,000,000 | |
| | FW | (Switzerland) | Josip Drmić | 22 | EU | Borussia Mönchengladbach | Transfer | Summer | €10,000,000 | |
| | FW | (Poland) | Arkadiusz Milik | 21 | EU | Ajax | Transfer | Summer | €2,800,000 | |
| | MF | (Germany) | Dominik Kohr | 21 | EU | FC Augsburg | Transfer | Summer | €1,400,000 | |
| | DF | (Germany) | Philipp Wollscheid | 26 | EU | Stoke City | Transfer | Summer | €3,800,000 | |
| | MF | (Germany) | Stefan Reinartz | 26 | EU | Eintracht Frankfurt | Transfer | Summer | | |
| | FW | (South Korea) | Son Heung-min | 23 | Non-EU | Tottenham Hotspur | Transfer | Summer | €30,000,000 | |

== Competitions ==
Win Draw Loss

=== Bundesliga ===
==== League table ====
| Pos | Team | Pld | W | D | L | GF | GA | GD | Pts | Qualification or relegation |
|---|---|---|---|---|---|---|---|---|---|---|
| 1 | Bayern Munich (C) | 34 | 28 | 4 | 2 | 80 | 17 | +63 | 88 | Qualification for the Champions League group stage |
| 2 | Borussia Dortmund | 34 | 24 | 6 | 4 | 82 | 34 | +48 | 78 | Qualification for the Champions League group stage |
| 3 | Bayer Leverkusen | 34 | 18 | 6 | 10 | 56 | 40 | +16 | 60 | Qualification for the Champions League group stage |
| 4 | Borussia Mönchengladbach | 34 | 17 | 4 | 13 | 67 | 50 | +17 | 55 | Qualification for the Champions League play-off round |
| 5 | Schalke 04 | 34 | 15 | 7 | 12 | 51 | 49 | +2 | 52 | Qualification for the Europa League group stage (Note: Since the winners of the 2015–16 DFB-Pokal, Bayern Munich, qualified for the Champions League based on league position, the Europa League group stage spot was passed to the sixth-placed team, Mainz 05; and the Europa League third qualifying round spot was passed to the seventh-placed team, Hertha BSC.) |

Source: DFB
Rules for classification: 1) Points; 2) Goal difference; 3) Goals scored; 4) Head-to-head points; 5) Head-to-head goal difference; 6) Head-to-head away goals scored; 7) Away goals scored; 8) Play-offs.
(C) Champions

==== Results summary ====
| Overall | | | | | | | | Home | | | | | | Away | | | | | |
| Pld | W | D | L | GF | GA | GD | Pts | W | D | L | GF | GA | GD | W | D | L | GF | GA | GD |
|---|---|---|---|---|---|---|---|---|---|---|---|---|---|---|---|---|---|---|---|
| 34 | 18 | 6 | 10 | 56 | 40 | +16 | 60 | 10 | 3 | 4 | 31 | 17 | +14 | 8 | 3 | 6 | 25 | 23 | +2 |

Last updated: 14 May 2016.
Source: Bundesliga

==== Results by round ====
| Round | 1 | 2 | 3 | 4 | 5 | 6 | 7 | 8 | 9 | 10 | 11 | 12 | 13 | 14 | 15 | 16 | 17 | 18 | 19 | 20 | 21 | 22 | 23 | 24 | 25 | 26 | 27 | 28 | 29 | 30 | 31 | 32 | 33 | 34 |
|---|---|---|---|---|---|---|---|---|---|---|---|---|---|---|---|---|---|---|---|---|---|---|---|---|---|---|---|---|---|---|---|---|---|---|
| Ground | H | A | A | H | A | H | A | H | A | H | A | H | A | H | A | H | A | A | H | H | A | H | A | H | A | H | A | H | A | H | A | H | A | H |
| Result | W | W | L | L | L | W | W | D | D | W | L | L | W | D | L | W | W | D | W | D | W | L | L | L | D | W | W | W | W | W | W | W | L | W |
| Position | 5 | 3 | 6 | 13 | 13 | 11 | 5 | 7 | 7 | 6 | 7 | 8 | 6 | 6 | 8 | 6 | 5 | 5 | 4 | 5 | 3 | 4 | 6 | 7 | 8 | 7 | 6 | 5 | 4 | 3 | 3 | 3 | 3 | 3 |

Updated to match(es) played on 14 May 2016. Source: Bundesliga
A = Away; H = Home; W = Win; D = Draw; L = Loss

==== Matches ====
| 15 August 2015 1 | Bayer Leverkusen | 2–1 | TSG Hoffenheim | Leverkusen |
| 15:30 CEST (UTC+02:00) | Wendell (yellow card) 11'; Kießling 45'; Brandt 71' | Report | Zuber 5' | Stadium: BayArena; Attendance: 27,125; Referee: Robert Hartmann |

| 22 August 2015 2 | Hannover 96 | 0–1 | Bayer Leverkusen | Hanover |
| 15:30 CEST (UTC+02:00) | | Report | Çalhanoğlu 18' | Stadium: HDI-Arena; Attendance: 39,100; Referee: Wolfgang Stark |

| 29 August 2015 3 | Bayern Munich | 3–0 | Bayer Leverkusen | Munich |
| 18:30 CEST (UTC+02:00) | Bernat (yellow card) 8'; Thiago (yellow card) 19'; Müller 26', 60' (pen.); Robben 71' (pen.) | Report | Wendell (yellow card) 6'; Kramer (yellow card) 18'; Kruse (yellow card) 72' | Stadium: Allianz Arena; Attendance: 75,000; Referee: Florian Meyer |

| 12 September 2015 4 | Bayer Leverkusen | 0–1 | Darmstadt 98 | Leverkusen |
| 15:30 CEST (UTC+02:00) | Papadopoulos (yellow card) 35'; Wendell (yellow card) 41'; Bellarabi (yellow card) 90+2' | Report | Sulu 8'; Mathenia (yellow card) 68' | Stadium: BayArena; Attendance: 29,396; Referee: Peter Sippel |

| 20 September 2015 5 | Borussia Dortmund | 3–0 | Bayer Leverkusen | Dortmund |
| 17:30 CEST (UTC+02:00) | Hofmann 19'; Kagawa 58'; Papastathopoulos (yellow card) 61'; Aubameyang 74' (pen.) | Report | Kampl (yellow card) 41'; Papadopoulos (yellow card) 71'; Wendell (yellow card) 73' | Stadium: Signal Iduna Park; Attendance: 81,359; Referee: Deniz Aytekin |

| 23 September 2015 6 | Bayer Leverkusen | 1–0 | Mainz 05 | Leverkusen |
| 20:00 CEST (UTC+02:00) | Bender (yellow card) 51'; Hernández 69'; Donati (yellow card) 75'; Ramalho (yellow card) 84' | Report | | Stadium: BayArena; Attendance: 24,805; Referee: Marco Fritz |

| 26 September 2015 7 | Werder Bremen | 0–3 | Bayer Leverkusen | Bremen |
| 15:30 CEST (UTC+02:00) | S. García (yellow card) 39' | Report | Mehmedi 31'; Bellarabi (yellow card) 43'; Brandt 58'; Kampl 65'; Donati (yellow card) 83' | Stadium: Weserstadion; Attendance: 40,005; Referee: Wolfgang Stark |

| 4 October 2015 8 | Bayer Leverkusen | 1–1 | FC Augsburg | Leverkusen |
| 17:30 CEST (UTC+02:00) | Bellarabi 39'; Wendell (yellow card) 69'; Donati (yellow card) 72' | Report | Leno 12' (o.g.); Callsen-Bracker (yellow card) 53'; Baier (yellow card) 68'; Hitz (yellow card) 90+1' | Stadium: BayArena; Attendance: 28,475; Referee: Tobias Stieler |

| 17 October 2015 9 | Hamburger SV | 0–0 | Bayer Leverkusen | Hamburg |
| 15:30 CEST (UTC+02:00) | Hunt (yellow card) 26'; Lasogga (yellow card) 31'; Ekdal (yellow card) 38'; Iličević (yellow card) 59'; Díaz (yellow card) 88'; Spahić (yellow card) 90+1' | Report | Hernández (yellow card) 74'; Jedvaj (yellow card) 75' | Stadium: Volksparkstadion; Attendance: 54,957; Referee: Tobias Welz |

| 24 October 2015 10 | Bayer Leverkusen | 4–3 | VfB Stuttgart | Leverkusen |
| 15:30 CEST (UTC+02:00) | Bellarabi 57'; Boenisch 70', (yellow card) 86'; Hernández 71'; Mehmedi 89', (yellow card) 90' | Report | Šunjić (yellow card) 45'; Harnik 50'; Didavi 54'; Rupp 60'; Schwaab (yellow card) 81'; Ristl (yellow card) 90+1'; Insúa (yellow card) 90+3' | Stadium: BayArena; Attendance: 30,210; Referee: Felix Brych |

| 31 October 2015 11 | VfL Wolfsburg | 2–1 | Bayer Leverkusen | Wolfsburg |
| 18:30 CET (UTC+01:00) | Bendtner 34'; Draxler 77' | Report | Papadopoulos (yellow card) 17'; Hernández 40'; Wendell (yellow card) 78' | Stadium: Volkswagen Arena; Attendance: 28,766; Referee: Manuel Gräfe |

| 7 November 2015 12 | Bayer Leverkusen | 1–2 | 1. FC Köln | Leverkusen |
| 15:30 CET (UTC+01:00) | Hernández 33'; Papadopoulos (red card) 53'; Ramalho (yellow card) 86' | Report | Maroh 17', 72'; Bittencourt (yellow card) 40'; Heintz (yellow card) 65' | Stadium: BayArena; Attendance: 30,210; Referee: Felix Zwayer |

| 21 November 2015 13 | Eintracht Frankfurt | 1–3 | Bayer Leverkusen | Frankfurt |
| 15:30 CET (UTC+01:00) | Medojević 45'; Oczipka (yellow card) 66'; Gerezgiher (yellow card) 69' | Report | Hernández 23', 39'; Çalhanoğlu 72'; Mehmedi (yellow card) 77' | Stadium: Commerzbank-Arena; Attendance: 47,500; Referee: Deniz Aytekin |

| 29 November 2015 14 | Bayer Leverkusen | 1–1 | Schalke 04 | Leverkusen |
| 17:30 CET (UTC+01:00) | Tah (yellow card) 8'; Riether 85' (o.g.) | Report | Choupo-Moting (yellow card) 38', (goal) 50'; Goretzka (yellow card) 75' | Stadium: BayArena; Attendance: 30,210; Referee: Marco Fritz |

| 5 December 2015 15 | Hertha BSC | 2–1 | Bayer Leverkusen | Berlin |
| 15:30 CET (UTC+01:00) | Darida 7', (yellow card) 35'; Brooks 60' | Report | Boenisch (red card) 17'; Hernández 29', (yellow card) 90+3'; Kampl (yellow card) 61'; Hilbert (yellow card) 84' | Stadium: Olympiastadion; Attendance: 41,819; Referee: Robert Hartmann |

| 12 December 2015 16 | Bayer Leverkusen | 5–0 | Borussia Mönchengladbach | Leverkusen |
| 18:30 CET (UTC+01:00) | Kießling 30', 66'; Hernández 63', 75', 76' | Report | Jantschke (yellow card) 40'; Korb (yellow card) 81' | Stadium: BayArena; Attendance: 30,210; Referee: Tobias Stieler |

| 19 December 2015 17 | FC Ingolstadt | 0–1 | Bayer Leverkusen | Ingolstadt |
| 15:30 CET (UTC+01:00) | Matip (yellow card) 73' da Costa (yellow card) 76' | Report | Kramer (yellow card) 45'; Hernández 73', (yellow card) 74'; Kampl (yellow card) 90+3' | Stadium: Audi Sportpark; Attendance: 15,000; Referee: Felix Zwayer |

| 23 January 2016 18 | TSG Hoffenheim | 1–1 | Bayer Leverkusen | Sinsheim |
| 15:30 CET (UTC+01:00) | Kim (yellow card) 17'; Hamad 40', (yellow card) 73' | Report | Jedvaj (yellow card) 58'; Toprak 75'; Donati (yellow card) 86' | Stadium: Wirsol Rhein-Neckar-Arena; Attendance: 24,140; Referee: Marco Fritz |

| 30 January 2016 19 | Bayer Leverkusen | 3–0 | Hannover 96 | Leverkusen |
| 15:30 CET (UTC+01:00) | Kießling 44'; Hernández 63' (pen.), 87' | Report | Gülselam (yellow card) 25'; Sakai (yellow card) 62'; Hoffmann (yellow card) 65' | Stadium: BayArena; Attendance: 28,790; Referee: Tobias Welz |

| 6 February 2016 20 | Bayer Leverkusen | 0–0 | Bayern Munich | Leverkusen |
| 18:30 CET (UTC+01:00) | | Report | Alonso (yellow card) 78' (yellow-red card) 84' | Stadium: BayArena; Attendance: 30,210; Referee: Knut Kircher |

| 13 February 2016 21 | Darmstadt 98 | 1–2 | Bayer Leverkusen | Darmstadt |
| 15:30 CET (UTC+01:00) | Wagner 28'; Gondorf (yellow card) 37'; Rosenthal (yellow card) 69'; Sulu (yellow card) 84'; Heller (yellow card) 85'; Niemeyer (yellow card) 88'; Rausch (yellow card) 90+2' | Report | Wendell (yellow card) 23'; Sulu 62' (o.g.); Brandt 77'; Ramalho (yellow card) 90'; Çalhanoğlu (yellow card) 90+2' | Stadium: Merck-Stadion am Böllenfalltor; Attendance: 16,800; Referee: Jochen Drees |

| 21 February 2016 22 | Bayer Leverkusen | 0–1 | Borussia Dortmund | Leverkusen |
| 15:30 CET (UTC+01:00) | Kampl (yellow card) 25'; Hernández (yellow card) 53'; Papadopoulos (yellow card) 56'; Bellarabi (yellow card) 58'; Wendell (yellow card) 89' | Report | Aubameyang 64'; Durm (yellow card) 87' | Stadium: BayArena; Attendance: 30,210; Referee: Felix Zwayer |

| 28 February 2016 23 | Mainz 05 | 3–1 | Bayer Leverkusen | Mainz |
| 17:30 CET (UTC+01:00) | Mallı 14', 58' (pen.); Bussmann (yellow card) 25'; Córdoba 32' | Report | Jedvaj (yellow card) 57'; Hernández 65' | Stadium: Coface Arena; Attendance: 26,557; Referee: Deniz Aytekin |

| 2 March 2016 24 | Bayer Leverkusen | 1–4 | Werder Bremen | Leverkusen |
| 20:00 CET (UTC+01:00) | Hernández (yellow card) 43'; Djilobodji 69' (o.g.) | Report | Bartels 5'; Pizarro 55', 65' (pen.), 83'; Djilobodji (yellow card) 62' | Stadium: BayArena; Attendance: 25,506; Referee: Marco Fritz |

| 5 March 2016 25 | FC Augsburg | 3–3 | Bayer Leverkusen | Augsburg |
| 15:30 CET (UTC+01:00) | Koo 5', 44', 57'; Hong (yellow card) 25'; Kohr (yellow card) 79'; Gouweleeuw (red card) 90+2' | Report | Bellarabi 60'; Verhaegh 80' (o.g.); Kramer (yellow card) 88'; Çalhanoğlu 90+3' (pen.) | Stadium: WWK ARENA; Attendance: 27,610; Referee: Markus Schmidt |

| 13 March 2016 26 | Bayer Leverkusen | 1–0 | Hamburger SV | Leverkusen |
| 15:30 CET (UTC+01:00) | Ekdal 18' (o.g.); Frey (yellow card) 27'; Toprak (yellow card) 34'; Wendell (yellow card) 49'; Jedvaj (yellow card) 90+5' (yellow-red card) 90+6'; Kruse (yellow card) 90+7' | Report | Iličević (yellow card) 23'; N. Müller (yellow card) 31' | Stadium: BayArena; Attendance: 30,210; Referee: Christian Dingert |

| 20 March 2016 27 | VfB Stuttgart | 0–2 | Bayer Leverkusen | Stuttgart |
| 15:30 CET (UTC+01:00) | Niedermeier (yellow card) 32'; Dié (yellow card) 61'; Kostić (yellow card) 88' | Report | Brandt 11'; Ramalho (yellow card) 31'; Kießling (yellow card) 44'; Bellarabi 49'; Yurchenko (yellow card) 82' | Stadium: Mercedes-Benz Arena; Attendance: 54,522; Referee: Daniel Siebert |

| 1 April 2016 28 | Bayer Leverkusen | 3–0 | VfL Wolfsburg | Leverkusen |
| 20:30 CEST (UTC+02:00) | Brandt 27'; Hernández 73'; Yurchenko 87' | Report | Dante (yellow card) 58'; Draxler (yellow card) 76'; Arnold (yellow card) 82'; Schürrle (yellow card) 84' | Stadium: BayArena; Attendance: 29,239; Referee: Felix Brych |

| 10 April 2016 29 | 1. FC Köln | 0–2 | Bayer Leverkusen | Cologne |
| 17:30 CEST (UTC+02:00) | Heintz (yellow card) 90+3'; Bittencourt (red card) 90+6' | Report | Wendell (yellow card) 9' (yellow-red card) 90+6'; Brandt 39'; Hernández 44'; Ramalho (yellow card) 70'; Aránguiz (yellow card) 76' | Stadium: RheinEnergieSTADION; Attendance: 50,000; Referee: Manuel Gräfe |

| 16 April 2016 30 | Bayer Leverkusen | 3–0 | Eintracht Frankfurt | Leverkusen |
| 15:30 CEST (UTC+02:00) | Yurchenko (yellow card) 34'; Bellarabi (yellow card) 61', (goal) 90'; Kampl 70'; Tah (yellow card) 73'; Brandt 76'; Jedvaj (yellow card) 78' | Report | Seferovic (yellow card) 60'; Aigner (yellow card) 73'; Chandler (yellow card) 85' | Stadium: BayArena; Attendance: 30,210; Referee: Deniz Aytekin |

| 23 April 2016 31 | Schalke 04 | 2–3 | Bayer Leverkusen | Gelsenkirchen |
| 18:30 CEST (UTC+02:00) | Choupo-Moting 14'; Júnior Caiçara (yellow card) 27'; Sané 29', (yellow card) 38'; Højbjerg (yellow card) 52' | Report | Toprak (yellow card) 5'; Bender (yellow card) 33'; Brandt 54'; Bellarabi 56'; Hernández 60', (yellow card) 90+1' | Stadium: Veltins-Arena; Attendance: 62,271; Referee: Wolfgang Stark |

| 30 April 2016 32 | Bayer Leverkusen | 2–1 | Hertha BSC | Leverkusen |
| 18:30 CEST (UTC+02:00) | Brandt 2'; Bender 16'; Bellarabi (yellow card) 90+3' | Report | Ibišević 21', (yellow card) 53'; Langkamp (yellow card) 45+1'; Stark (yellow card) 70'; Plattenhardt (yellow card) 78'; Lustenberger (yellow card) 88'; Weiser (yellow card) 90+4' | Stadium: BayArena; Attendance: 30,210; Referee: Tobias Stieler |

| 7 May 2016 33 | Borussia Mönchengladbach | 2–1 | Bayer Leverkusen | Mönchengladbach |
| 15:30 CEST (UTC+02:00) | Hahn 43', 79'; Wendt (yellow card) 60'; Traoré (yellow card) 76' | Report | Aránguiz 20'; Bender (yellow card) 30'; Jedvaj (yellow card) 88' | Stadium: Stadion im Borussia-Park; Attendance: 54,010; Referee: Bastian Dankert |

| 14 May 2016 34 | Bayer Leverkusen | 3–2 | FC Ingolstadt | Leverkusen |
| 15:30 CEST (UTC+02:00) | Aránguiz 31'; Kampl 37'; Kießling 61'; Henrichs (yellow card) 72' | Report | Leckie 16'; Hartmann 69' (pen.); Christiansen (yellow card) 81' | Stadium: BayArena; Attendance: 29,220; Referee: Guido Winkmann |

=== DFB-Pokal ===
| 8 August 2015 Round 1 | Sportfreunde Lotte | 0–3 | Bayer Leverkusen | Lotte |
| 15:30 CEST (UTC+02:00) | Hettich (yellow card) 21'; Freiberger (yellow card) 27'; Langlitz (yellow card) 35'; Latkowski (yellow card) 38'; Gorschlüter (red card) 76' | Report | Kießling 15'; Hilbert (yellow card) 23'; Çalhanoğlu 55' (pen.); Kramer (yellow card) 68'; Bender 77' (pen.) | Stadium: Sportpark am Lotter Kreuz; Attendance: 5,466; Referee: Martin Thomsen |

| 28 October 2015 Round 2 | Viktoria Köln | 0–6 | Bayer Leverkusen | Cologne |
| 19:00 CET (UTC+01:00) | Brzenska (yellow card) 70' (yellow-red card) 75' | Report | Brandt 15'; Bellarabi 35'; Hernández 38', 54'; Kießling 80'; Yurchenko 83' | Stadium: Sportpark Höhenberg; Attendance: 6,166; Referee: Benjamin Cortus |

| 15 December 2015 Round of 16 | SpVgg Unterhaching | 1–3 | Bayer Leverkusen | Unterhaching |
| 19:15 CET (UTC+01:00) | Bauer 27'; Taffertshofer (yellow card) 71' (yellow-red card) 79' | Report | Tah (yellow card) 23'; Hernández 31'; Kießling 55'; Bellarabi 83' | Stadium: Alpenbauer Sportpark; Attendance: 12,500; Referee: Jochen Drees |

| 9 February 2016 Quarter-finals | Bayer Leverkusen | 1–3 | Werder Bremen | Leverkusen |
| 19:00 CET (UTC+01:00) | Hernández 22' (pen.); Wendell (red card) 41'; Çalhanoğlu (yellow card) 52' | Report | Gálvez (yellow card) 21'; S. García 31', (yellow card) 34'; Pizarro 42' (pen.); Grillitsch 82' | Stadium: BayArena; Attendance: 24,104; Referee: Wolfgang Stark |

=== UEFA Champions League ===
==== Play-off round ====
| 18 August 2015 First leg | Lazio (Italy) | 1–0 | (Germany) Bayer Leverkusen | Rome, Italy |
| 20:45 CEST (UTC+02:00) | Maurício (yellow card) 49'; Keita 77'; Milinković-Savić (yellow card) 82' | Report | Kießling (yellow card) 20'; Leno (yellow card) 31'; Wendell (yellow card) 36'; Papadopoulos (yellow card) 82' | Stadium: Stadio Olimpico; Attendance: 38,917; Referee: Jonas Eriksson (Sweden) |

| 26 August 2015 Second leg | Bayer Leverkusen (Germany) | 3–0 (3–1 agg.) | (Italy) Lazio | Leverkusen, Germany |
| 20:45 CEST (UTC+02:00) | Bellarabi (yellow card) 37', (goal) 88'; Çalhanoğlu 40'; Mehmedi 48'; Wendell (yellow card) 67'; Hilbert (yellow card) 86' | Report | Maurício (yellow card) 60' (yellow-red card) 68'; Parolo (yellow card) 71'; Lulić (yellow card) 74' | Stadium: BayArena; Attendance: 28,222; Referee: Carlos Velasco Carballo (Spain) |

==== Group stage ====
| Pos | Team | Pld | W | D | L | GF | GA | GD | Pts | Qualification | BAR | ROM | LEV | BATE |
|---|---|---|---|---|---|---|---|---|---|---|---|---|---|---|
| 1 | (Spain) Barcelona | 6 | 4 | 2 | 0 | 15 | 4 | +11 | 14 | Advance to knockout phase | — | 6–1 | 2–1 | 3–0 |
| 2 | (Italy) Roma | 6 | 1 | 3 | 2 | 11 | 16 | −5 | 6 | Advance to knockout phase | 1–1 | — | 3–2 | 0–0 |
| 3 | (Germany) Bayer Leverkusen | 6 | 1 | 3 | 2 | 13 | 12 | +1 | 6 | Transfer to Europa League | 1–1 | 4–4 | — | 4–1 |
| 4 | (Belarus) BATE Borisov | 6 | 1 | 2 | 3 | 5 | 12 | −7 | 5 | | 0–2 | 3–2 | 1–1 | — |

Source: UEFA
Rules for classification: Group stage tiebreakers

| 16 September 2015 1 | Bayer Leverkusen (Germany) | 4–1 | (Belarus) BATE Borisov | Leverkusen, Germany |
| 20:45 CEST (UTC+02:00) | Mehmedi 4'; Papadopoulos (yellow card) 41'; Çalhanoğlu 47', 76' (pen.); Hernández 59' | Report | Milunović 13'; Baha (yellow card) 45'; Mladenović (yellow card) 75'; Signevich (yellow card) 87' | Stadium: BayArena; Attendance: 24,280; Referee: Danny Makkelie (Netherlands) |

| 29 September 2015 2 | Barcelona (Spain) | 2–1 | (Germany) Bayer Leverkusen | Barcelona, Spain |
| 20:45 CEST UTC+02:00) | Mascherano (yellow card) 29'; Neymar (yellow card) 37'; Alba (yellow card) 75'; Roberto 80'; Suárez 82' | Report | Papadopoulos 22', (yellow card) 68'; Bender (yellow card) 40'; Çalhanoğlu (yellow card) 63'; Kampl (yellow card) 89' | Stadium: Camp Nou; Attendance: 68,694; Referee: Martin Atkinson (England) |

| 20 October 2015 3 | Bayer Leverkusen (Germany) | 4–4 | (Italy) Roma | Leverkusen, Germany |
| 20:45 CEST (UTC+02:00) | Hernández 4' (pen.), 19'; Kramer (yellow card) 36'; Kampl 84'; Mehmedi 86'; Wendell (yellow card) 90' | Report | Nainggolan (yellow card) 24'; De Rossi 29', 38', (yellow card) 34'; Pjanić 54'; Falque 73' | Stadium: BayArena; Attendance: 29,412; Referee: Viktor Kassai (Hungary) |

| 4 November 2015 4 | Roma (Italy) | 3–2 | (Germany) Bayer Leverkusen | Rome, Italy |
| 20:45 CET (UTC+01:00) | Salah 2'; Džeko 29'; Pjanić 80' (pen.); Torosidis (yellow card) 90+1'; Szczęsny (yellow card) 90+4' | Report | Mehmedi 46'; Hernández 51'; Papadopoulos (yellow card) 61'; Toprak (red card) 79' | Stadium: Stadio Olimpico; Attendance: 38,361; Referee: Sergei Karasev (Russia) |

| 24 November 2015 5 | BATE Borisov (Belarus) | 1–1 | (Germany) Bayer Leverkusen | Barysaw, Belarus |
| 18:00 CET (UTC+01:00) | Gordeichuk 2', (yellow card) 9'; Hleb (yellow card) 32'; Palyakow (yellow card) 63'; M. Valadzko (yellow card) 84' | Report | Kampl (yellow card) 34'; Mehmedi 68'; Wendell (yellow card) 79'; Donati (yellow card) 90+2' | Stadium: Borisov Arena; Attendance: 12,601; Referee: Clément Turpin (France) |

| 9 December 2015 6 | Bayer Leverkusen (Germany) | 1–1 | (Spain) Barcelona | Leverkusen, Germany |
| 20:45 CET (UTC+01:00) | Hernández 23'; Kampl (yellow card) 29' | Report | Messi 20'; Bartra (yellow card) 51'; Gumbau (yellow card) 85'; Rakitić (yellow card) 86' | Stadium: BayArena; Attendance: 29,412; Referee: Mark Clattenburg (England) |

=== UEFA Europa League ===
==== Knockout phase ====
===== Round of 32 =====
| 18 February 2016 First leg | Sporting CP (Portugal) | 0–1 | (Germany) Bayer Leverkusen | Lisbon, Portugal |
| 21:05 CET (UTC+01:00) | Semedo (yellow card) 58' (yellow-red card) 74' | Report | Jedvaj (yellow card) 21'; Bellarabi 26'; Mehmedi (yellow card) 30'; Çalhanoğlu (yellow card) 46' | Stadium: Estádio José Alvalade; Attendance: 26,201; Referee: Björn Kuipers (Netherlands) |

| 25 February 2016 Second leg | Bayer Leverkusen (Germany) | 3–1 (4–1 agg.) | (Portugal) Sporting CP | Leverkusen, Germany |
| 19:00 CET (UTC+01:00) | Bellarabi 29', 65'; Mehmedi (yellow card) 80'; Çalhanoğlu 87'; Ramalho (yellow card) 90+4' | Report | William Carvalho (yellow card) 33'; João Mário 38' | Stadium: BayArena; Attendance: 26,585; Referee: Ruddy Buquet (France) |

===== Round of 16 =====
| 10 March 2016 First leg | Villarreal (Spain) | 2–0 | (Germany) Bayer Leverkusen | Villarreal, Spain |
| 21:05 CET (UTC+01:00) | Bakambu 4', 56'; Trigueros (yellow card) 71' | Report | Tah (yellow card) 14'; Hernández (yellow card) 48'; Jedvaj (yellow card) 76' (yellow-red card) 90+5' | Stadium: El Madrigal; Attendance: 16,211; Referee: Gianluca Rocchi (Italy) |

| 17 March 2016 Second leg | Bayer Leverkusen (Germany) | 0–0 (0–2 agg.) | (Spain) Villarreal | Leverkusen, Germany |
| 19:00 CET (UTC+01:00) | Mehmedi (yellow card) 42'; Papadopoulos (yellow card) 73'; Bellarabi (yellow card) 78' | Report | Rukavina (yellow card) 60'; Bakambu (yellow card) 80' | Stadium: BayArena; Attendance: 23,409; Referee: Willie Collum (Scotland) |

== Statistics ==
=== Appearances and goals ===
| No. | Pos | Nat | Player | Total | | Bundesliga | | DFB-Pokal | | Champions League | | Europa League | |
| No. | Pos | Nat | Player | Apps | Goals | Apps | Goals | Apps | Goals | Apps | Goals | Apps | Goals |
Goalkeepers
| 1 | GK | (Germany) GER | Bernd Leno | 49 | 0 | 33 | 0 | 4 | 0 | 8 | 0 | 4 | 0 |
| 22 | GK | (United States) USA | David Yelldell | 1 | 0 | 0+1 | 0 | 0 | 0 | 0 | 0 | 0 | 0 |
| 25 | GK | (Croatia) CRO | Dario Krešić | 2 | 0 | 1 | 0 | 0+1 | 0 | 0 | 0 | 0 | 0 |
Defenders
| 2 | DF | (Brazil) BRA | André Ramalho | 25 | 0 | 11+8 | 0 | 0+2 | 0 | 1+1 | 0 | 0+2 | 0 |
| 4 | DF | (Germany) GER | Jonathan Tah | 45 | 0 | 29 | 0 | 4 | 0 | 8 | 0 | 4 | 0 |
| 5 | DF | (Greece) GRE | Kyriakos Papadopoulos | 20 | 0 | 10+6 | 0 | 2+2 | 0 | 0 | 0 | 0 | 0 |
| 13 | DF | (Germany) GER | Roberto Hilbert | 20 | 0 | 9+3 | 0 | 2 | 0 | 4+1 | 0 | 0+1 | 0 |
| 16 | DF | (Croatia) CRO | Tin Jedvaj | 18 | 0 | 11+4 | 0 | 0 | 0 | 0 | 0 | 3 | 0 |
| 17 | DF | (Poland) POL | Sebastian Boenisch | 8 | 1 | 7+1 | 1 | 0 | 0 | 0 | 0 | 0 | 0 |
| 18 | DF | (Brazil) BRA | Wendell | 44 | 0 | 26+2 | 0 | 4 | 0 | 8 | 0 | 4 | 0 |
| 21 | DF | (Turkey) TUR | Ömer Toprak | 25 | 1 | 17+2 | 1 | 2 | 0 | 3 | 0 | 1 | 0 |
| 33 | DF | (Germany) GER | Lukas Boeder | 0 | 0 | 0 | 0 | 0 | 0 | 0 | 0 | 0 | 0 |
| 39 | DF | (Germany) GER | Benjamin Henrichs | 10 | 0 | 5+4 | 0 | 0 | 0 | 0 | 0 | 0+1 | 0 |
Midfielders
| 8 | MF | (Germany) GER | Lars Bender | 17 | 2 | 11 | 1 | 1+1 | 1 | 4 | 0 | 0 | 0 |
| 10 | MF | (Turkey) TUR | Hakan Çalhanoğlu | 46 | 8 | 27+4 | 3 | 3 | 1 | 8 | 3 | 4 | 1 |
| 14 | MF | (Switzerland) SUI | Admir Mehmedi | 41 | 7 | 14+14 | 2 | 2 | 0 | 5+2 | 5 | 2+2 | 0 |
| 20 | MF | (Chile) CHI | Charles Aránguiz | 7 | 2 | 5+2 | 2 | 0 | 0 | 0 | 0 | 0 | 0 |
| 23 | MF | (Germany) GER | Christoph Kramer | 44 | 0 | 28 | 0 | 4 | 0 | 6+2 | 0 | 4 | 0 |
| 35 | MF | (Ukraine) UKR | Vladlen Yurchenko | 11 | 2 | 3+4 | 1 | 0+1 | 1 | 0+2 | 0 | 0+1 | 0 |
| 37 | MF | (Germany) GER | Marlon Frey | 12 | 0 | 2+7 | 0 | 0+1 | 0 | 0 | 0 | 1+1 | 0 |
| 38 | MF | (Germany) GER | Karim Bellarabi | 49 | 12 | 31+2 | 6 | 4 | 2 | 7+1 | 1 | 4 | 3 |
| 44 | MF | (Slovakia) SVK | Kevin Kampl | 31 | 4 | 19+3 | 3 | 3 | 0 | 6 | 1 | 0 | 0 |
Forwards
| 7 | FW | (Mexico) MEX | Javier Hernández | 40 | 26 | 25+3 | 17 | 3 | 4 | 6 | 5 | 3 | 0 |
| 11 | FW | (Germany) GER | Stefan Kießling | 43 | 8 | 19+11 | 5 | 3+1 | 3 | 3+3 | 0 | 3 | 0 |
| 19 | FW | (Germany) GER | Julian Brandt | 44 | 10 | 18+11 | 9 | 1+2 | 1 | 0+8 | 0 | 4 | 0 |
Players transferred out during the season
| 26 | DF | (Italy) ITA | Giulio Donati | 18 | 0 | 10+2 | 0 | 2 | 0 | 4 | 0 | 0 | 0 |
| 24 | MF | (South Korea) KOR | Ryu Seung-woo | 0 | 0 | 0 | 0 | 0 | 0 | 0 | 0 | 0 | 0 |
| 7 | FW | (South Korea) KOR | Son Heung-min | 2 | 0 | 1 | 0 | 0 | 0 | 1 | 0 | 0 | 0 |
| 27 | FW | (Australia) AUS | Robbie Kruse | 5 | 0 | 0+2 | 0 | 0+1 | 0 | 0+2 | 0 | 0 | 0 |

Last updated: 14 May 2016
Source: Competitions

=== Goalscorers ===
This includes all competitive matches. The list is sorted by shirt number when total goals are equal.

| Rank | Pos | No. | Nat | Name | Bundesliga | DFB-Pokal | Champions League | Europa League | Total |
|---|---|---|---|---|---|---|---|---|---|
| 1 | FW | 7 | (Mexico) | Javier Hernández | 17 | 4 | 5 | 0 | 26 |
| 2 | MF | 38 | (Germany) | Karim Bellarabi | 6 | 2 | 1 | 3 | 12 |
| 3 | MF | 19 | (Germany) | Julian Brandt | 9 | 1 | 0 | 0 | 10 |
| 4 | FW | 11 | (Germany) | Stefan Kießling | 5 | 3 | 0 | 0 | 8 |
| 4 | MF | 10 | (Turkey) | Hakan Çalhanoğlu | 3 | 1 | 3 | 1 | 8 |
| 6 | FW | 14 | (Switzerland) | Admir Mehmedi | 2 | 0 | 5 | 0 | 7 |
| 7 | MF | 44 | (Slovenia) | Kevin Kampl | 3 | 0 | 1 | 0 | 4 |
| 8 | MF | 20 | (Chile) | Charles Aránguiz | 2 | 0 | 0 | 0 | 2 |
| 8 | MF | 35 | (Ukraine) | Vladlen Yurchenko | 1 | 1 | 0 | 0 | 2 |
| 8 | MF | 8 | (Germany) | Lars Bender | 1 | 1 | 0 | 0 | 2 |
| 11 | DF | 17 | (Poland) | Sebastian Boenisch | 1 | 0 | 0 | 0 | 1 |
| 11 | DF | 21 | (Turkey) | Ömer Toprak | 1 | 0 | 0 | 0 | 1 |
| 11 | DF | 5 | (Greece) | Kyriakos Papadopoulos | 0 | 0 | 1 | 0 | 1 |
| TOTALS | | | | | 51 | 13 | 16 | 4 | 84 |

Last updated on 14 May 2016

=== Assists ===
This includes all competitive matches. The list is sorted by shirt number when total assists are equal.

| Rank | Pos | No. | Nat | Name | Bundesliga | DFB-Pokal | Champions League | Europa League | Total |
|---|---|---|---|---|---|---|---|---|---|
| 1 | MF | 38 | (Germany) | Karim Bellarabi | 11 | 1 | 3 | 0 | 15 |
| 2 | MF | 10 | (Turkey) | Hakan Çalhanoğlu | 5 | 0 | 2 | 0 | 7 |
| 2 | MF | 19 | (Germany) | Julian Brandt | 3 | 3 | 1 | 0 | 7 |
| 4 | FW | 14 | (Switzerland) | Admir Mehmedi | 5 | 0 | 1 | 0 | 6 |
| 5 | FW | 7 | (Mexico) | Javier Hernández | 2 | 1 | 0 | 1 | 4 |
| 5 | FW | 11 | (Germany) | Stefan Kießling | 2 | 2 | 0 | 0 | 4 |
| 7 | MF | 44 | (Slovenia) | Kevin Kampl | 0 | 0 | 2 | 0 | 2 |
| 7 | DF | 18 | (Brazil) | Wendell | 0 | 1 | 1 | 0 | 2 |
| 9 | MF | 23 | (Germany) | Christoph Kramer | 1 | 0 | 0 | 0 | 1 |
| 9 | DF | 13 | (Germany) | Roberto Hilbert | 1 | 0 | 0 | 0 | 1 |
| 9 | MF | 39 | (Germany) | Benjamin Henrichs | 1 | 0 | 0 | 0 | 1 |
| 9 | MF | 20 | (Chile) | Charles Aránguiz | 1 | 0 | 0 | 0 | 1 |
| 9 | DF | 16 | (Croatia) | Tin Jedvaj | 0 | 0 | 0 | 1 | 1 |
| 9 | DF | 4 | (Germany) | Jonathan Tah | 0 | 0 | 0 | 1 | 1 |
| 9 | DF | 2 | (Brazil) | André Ramalho | 0 | 0 | 0 | 1 | 1 |
| 9 | MF | 35 | (Ukraine) | Vladlen Yurchenko | 0 | 1 | 0 | 0 | 1 |
| 9 | MF | 37 | (Germany) | Marlon Frey | 0 | 1 | 0 | 0 | 1 |
| Total | | | | | 32 | 10 | 10 | 4 | 56 |

Last updated on 14 May 2016
