= Kaffenberger =

Kaffenberger is a German surname. Notable people with the surname include:

- Bijan Kaffenberger (born 1989), German politician
- Marcel Kaffenberger (born 1994), German footballer and coach
- Marco Kaffenberger (born 1996), German footballer
