= Benedikt Fernandez =

German footballer

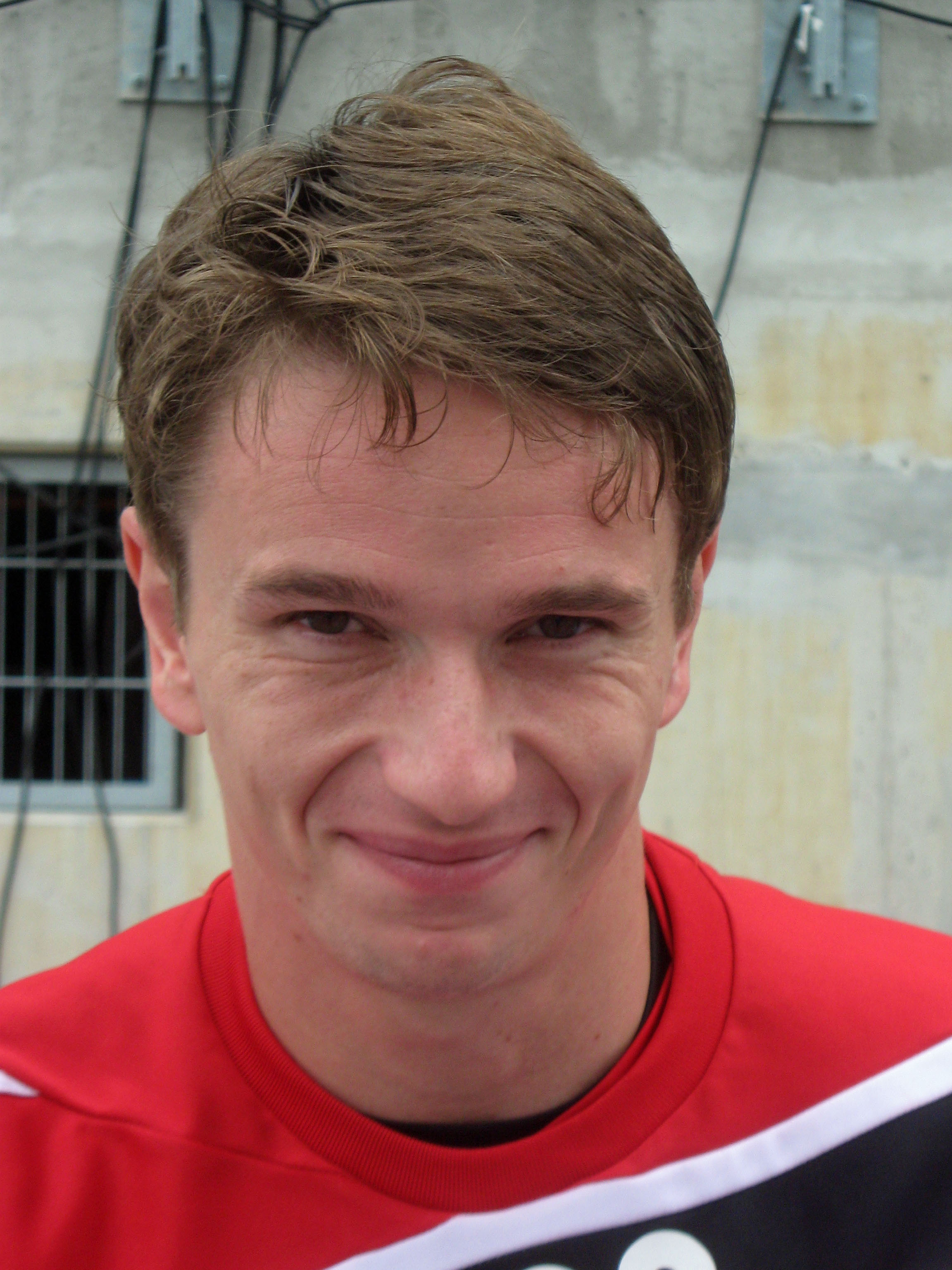

Personal information
- Date of birth: 8 January 1985 (age 41)
- Place of birth: Bonn, West Germany
- Height: 1.84 m (6 ft 0 in)
- Position: Goalkeeper

Youth career
- TUS Buisdorf
- Tura Hennef
- Renault Brühl
- 2000–2005: Bayer Leverkusen

Senior career*
Years	Team	Apps	(Gls)
2005–2011	Bayer Leverkusen II	51	(0)
2006–2011	Bayer Leverkusen	6	(0)
2012–2013	1. FC Saarbrücken	18	(0)
2013–2018	Sportfreunde Lotte	160	(0)
- * Club domestic league appearances and goals as of 30 July 2018

Benedikt Fernandez (born 8 January 1985) is a German football goalkeeper.

== Club career ==
Born in Bonn, Fernandez joined Bayer Leverkusen's youth academy in 2000 and started playing for the club's reserve team in 2005. In 2006, he signed a professional contract with the club to play understudy to Hans-Jörg Butt and René Adler. He made his Bundesliga debut on 10 February 2007 against Eintracht Frankfurt, coming on as a substitute following a red card to Hans-Jörg Butt. He made one more appearance in the Bundesliga that season before being replaced by René Adler, who went on to establish himself as the club's first-choice goalkeeper.

Following the departure of Hans-Jörg Butt in the summer of 2007, Fernandez became the second-choice goalkeeper in Leverkusen's first team, also continuing to occasionally play for the reserves. His first appearance for the first team in the 2007–08 season was his UEFA Cup debut against FC Zürich on 19 December 2007. He only made two further appearances with the first team thereafter, one in the Bundesliga and one in the UEFA Cup, deputising for the injured Adler in late February 2008.

Due to another injury to Adler, Leverkusen started their 2008–09 Bundesliga campaign with Fernandez in goal, with him subsequently making further Bundesliga appearances before Adler returned to action in mid-September 2008. At the end of the 2010–11 season, he left Bayer Leverkusen. After a year without a club, he signed for 1. FC Saarbrücken in 2012.

== Personal life ==
Fernandez is of Spanish descent through his father.

== Career statistics ==
As of matches played on 24 April 2018.

Club	Season	League			Cup		Continental		Other^{1}		Total	
Club	Season	Division	Apps	Goals	Apps	Goals	Apps	Goals	Apps	Goals	Apps	Goals
Bayer Leverkusen II	2005–06	Regionalliga Nord	9	0	—		—				9	0
Bayer Leverkusen II	2006–07	Regionalliga Nord	18	0	—		—				18	0
Bayer Leverkusen II	2007–08	Oberliga Niederrhein	14	0	1	0	—				15	0
Bayer Leverkusen II	2008–09	Regionalliga West	2	0	—		—				2	0
Bayer Leverkusen II	2009–10	Regionalliga West	10	0	—		—				10	0
Bayer Leverkusen II	2010–11	Regionalliga West	15	0	—		—				15	0
Bayer Leverkusen II	Totals		68	0	1	0	—				69	0
Bayer Leverkusen	2006–07	Bundesliga	2	0	0	0	0	0	—		2	0
Bayer Leverkusen	2007–08	Bundesliga	1	0	0	0	2	0	—		3	0
Bayer Leverkusen	2008–09	Bundesliga	3	0	0	0	—		—		3	0
Bayer Leverkusen	Totals		6	0	0	0	2	0	—		8	0
Saarbrücken	2012–13	3. Liga	18	0	0	0	—		—		18	0
Sportfreunde Lotte	2013–14	Regionalliga Nord	36	0	—		—		—		36	0
Sportfreunde Lotte	2014–15	Regionalliga Nord	29	0	—		—		—		29	0
Sportfreunde Lotte	2015–16	Regionalliga Nord	35	0	1	0	—		2	0	38	0
Sportfreunde Lotte	2016–17	3. Liga	37	0	4	0	—		—		41	0
Sportfreunde Lotte	2017–18	3. Liga	22	0	0	0	—		—		22	0
Sportfreunde Lotte	Totals		159	0	5	0	—		2	0	166	0
Career totals			251	0	6	0	2	0	2	0	261	0

- 1.Includes Promotion Playoff.
