= Latkowski =

Latkowski or Łatkowski (feminine: Łatkowska, plural: Łatkowsky) is a Polish-language surname. Notable people with the name include:

- Daniel Latkowski (born 1991), a German footballer
- Klaudiusz Łatkowski (born 1985), a Polish professional football player
- Mariusz Latkowski (born 1982), a Polish bobsledder
