= Kevin Rodriguez =

Kevin Rodriguez may refer to:

- Kevin Rodriguez (soccer, born 1996), American soccer winger
- Kevin Rodríguez (footballer, born 2000), Ecuadorian football forward

== See also ==
- Kevin Rodrigues-Pires (born 1991), Portuguese-German football midfielder
- Kévin Rodrigues (born 1994), Portuguese-French football defender
