= Stingl =

Stingl is a German surname. Notable people with the surname include:

- Jörg Stingl (born 1961), German swimmer
- Josef Stingl (1919–2004), German politician
- Karl Stingl (1864–1936), German engineer, administrative official and politician
- Matthias Stingl (born 1998), German footballer
- Miloslav Stingl (1930–2020), Czech ethnologist, traveller and author
- Vince Stingl (1796 – c. 1850), Hungarian-German entrepreneur and industrialist

== See also ==
- Rudolf Stingel (born 1956), Italian-American artist
