= Tim Möller =

German footballer (born 1999)

Personal information
- Date of birth: 19 March 1999 (age 27)
- Place of birth: Osnabrück, Germany
- Height: 1.83 m (6 ft 0 in)
- Positions: Centre-back; defensive midfielder

Youth career
- –2018: VfL Osnabrück

Senior career*
Years	Team	Apps	(Gls)
2018–2022	VfL Osnabrück	6	(0)
2019–2020	→ Sportfreunde Lotte (loan)	18	(0)
2022–2023	SV Lippstadt	45	(1)
2023–2025	SV Meppen	62	(6)
- * Club domestic league appearances and goals

Tim Möller (born 19 March 1999) is a German former professional footballer who played as a centre-back or defensive midfielder.
