= Julian Brandt =

German footballer (born 1996)

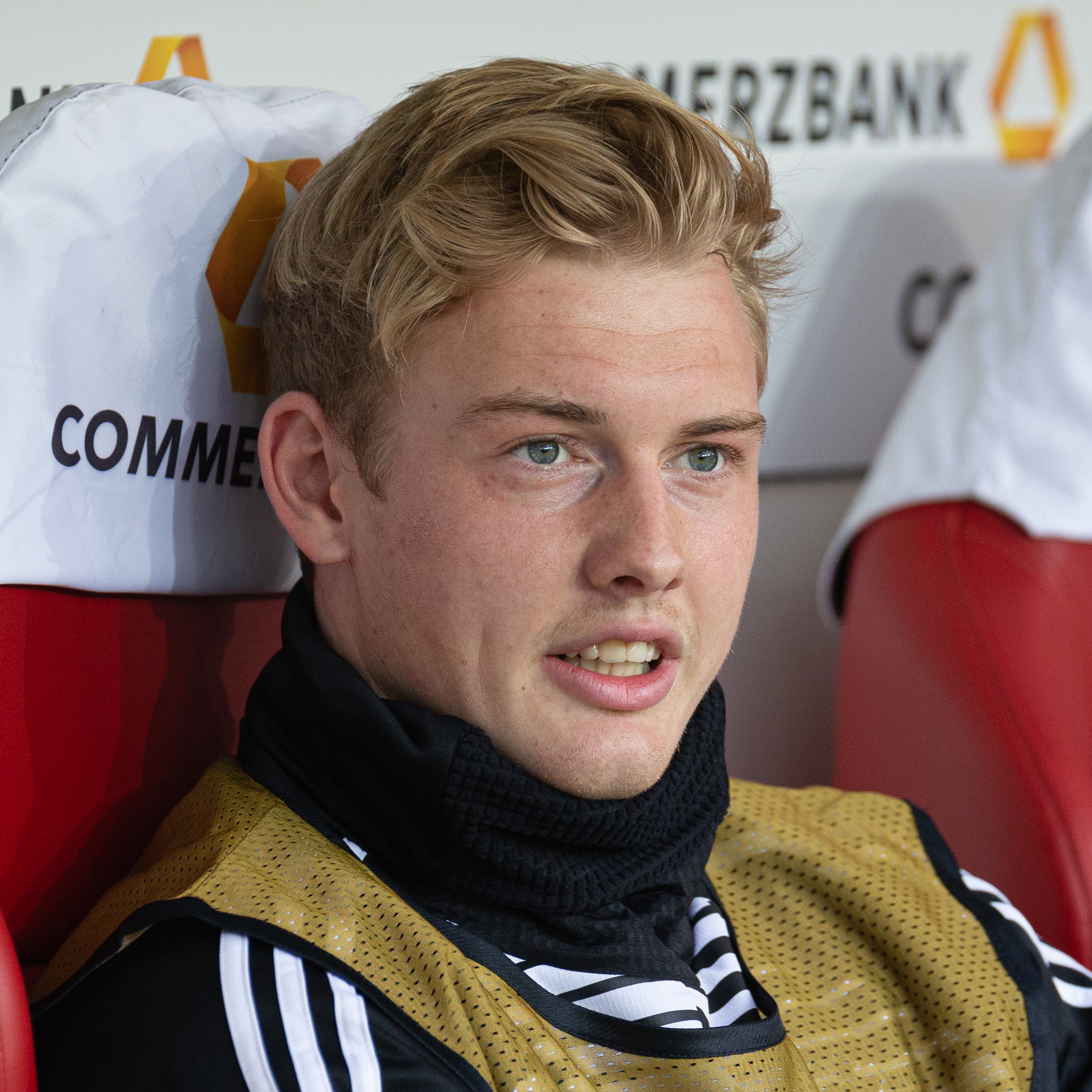
- Brandt with Germany in 2019

Personal information
- Full name: Julian Brandt
- Date of birth: 2 May 1996 (age 30)
- Place of birth: Bremen, Germany
- Height: 1.85 m (6 ft 1 in)
- Positions: Attacking midfielder; winger

Team information
- Current team: Ajax
- Number: 8

Youth career
- 2001–2009: SC Borgfeld
- 2009–2011: FC Oberneuland
- 2011–2014: VfL Wolfsburg

Senior career*
Years	Team	Apps	(Gls)
2014	Bayer Leverkusen II	1	(1)
2014–2019	Bayer Leverkusen	165	(34)
2019–2026	Borussia Dortmund	218	(43)
2026–	Ajax	10	(4)

International career
2011	Germany U15	2	(2)
2011–2012	Germany U16	3	(1)
2012–2013	Germany U17	19	(5)
2013–2014	Germany U19	14	(2)
2015	Germany U20	6	(2)
2015–2016	Germany U21	8	(1)
2016	Germany U23	6	(0)
2016–2024	Germany	48	(3)
Medal record
Men's football
Representing Germany
FIFA Confederations Cup
Winner	2017 Russia
Summer Olympic Games
Silver medal – second place	2016 Rio de Janeiro	Team
UEFA European Under-19 Championship
Winner	2014 Hungary
- * Club domestic league appearances and goals as of 25 October 2026

Julian Brandt (German pronunciation: [bʁant]; born 2 May 1996) is a German professional footballer who plays as an attacking midfielder or winger for Eredivisie club Ajax.

Brandt made over 55 combined appearances for Germany's youth teams, playing at every level from U15 to U21. He was a member of the squad that won the UEFA European Under-19 Championship in 2014. He made his senior debut for Germany in 2016, where he was selected in the preliminary UEFA Euro 2016 squad. He was then included in the Germany rosters for the 2018 and 2022 campaigns for the FIFA World Cup.

== Club career ==
=== Early career ===
Julian Brandt was born and raised in Bremen. In his youth, he played in his hometown at SC Borgfeld and then at FC Oberneuland before he joined the youth academy (Nachwuchsleistungszentrum) of VfL Wolfsburg.

=== Bayer Leverkusen ===
In January 2014, Brandt moved to Bayer Leverkusen during the January transfer window for a fee of €350,000, where he signed a professional contract until 2019. He made his professional debut on 15 February 2014 in the Bundesliga against Schalke 04. He replaced Son Heung-min after 82 minutes in a 1–2 home defeat.

Three days later he made his debut in the Champions League when he came on in the first knockout round first leg against Paris Saint-Germain in the 2013–14 season. On 4 April 2014, he scored his first goal for Bayer Leverkusen, as he equalized in the 1–2 defeat against Hamburg.

On 15 August 2015, Brandt scored the winning goal after appearing as a substitute in a 2–1 victory against 1899 Hoffenheim in Bayer's opening match of the 2015–16 Bundesliga season. Between 20 March and 30 April 2016, he scored in six consecutive Bundesliga matches, becoming the youngest player since Gerd Müller to achieve this by scoring 72 seconds into a 2–1 home win over Hertha BSC. On 7 December 2016, he scored his first Champions League goal in a 3–0 victory over Monaco.

On 26 August 2017, Brandt became the youngest-ever Leverkusen player to reach 100 Bundesliga appearances, doing so at the age 21 years, three months and 25 days during a 2–2 draw against Hoffenheim.

During the second half of the 2018–19 Bundesliga campaign, Brandt was re-positioned by new club manager Peter Bosz, shifting from his natural wide position to a more central role in midfield alongside Kai Havertz.

His goal contribution increased as a result of the positional change and in February 2019, after scoring twice and assisting a further four goals, he was nominated for the Player of the Month award. He ultimately won the award and in doing so became the first Leverkusen player to claim the accolade. His brace against Mainz 05 at the start of the month also came on the occasion of his 200th appearance for the club across all competitions.

=== Borussia Dortmund ===
Brandt was Dortmund's transfer target after the 23-year-old scored seven league goals, provided eleven assists and subsequently helped Leverkusen to finish fourth in Bundesliga and secure a Champions League third qualifying round spot for next season. On 22 May 2019, Brandt completed a transfer to Borussia Dortmund on a five-year deal for a reported €25 million after Dortmund activated a release clause in his contract.

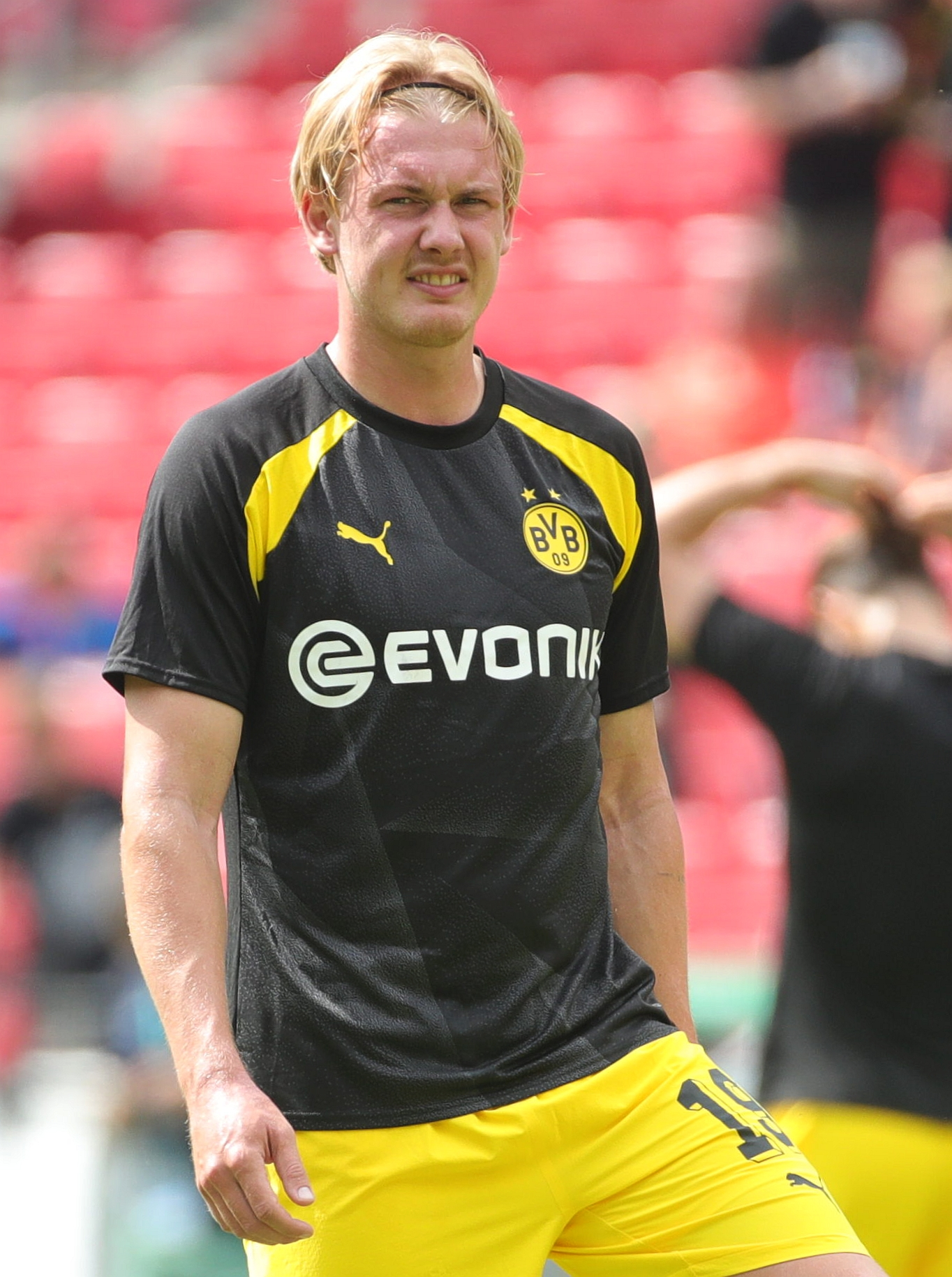
Brandt with Borussia Dortmund in 2023

Brandt scored his first Bundesliga goal for Borussia Dortmund in his first match on 17 August, a 5–1 against FC Augsburg on the first matchday, coming on as substitute for Thorgan Hazard. Later that year, on 5 November, he scored his first Champions League goal for the club in a 3–2 win over Inter Milan.

Brandt became a key player in the midfield, despite some struggles with consistency and positioning, particularly during the 2020–21 season. His performance improved in subsequent seasons, contributing significantly to Dortmund's offense and securing a DFB-Pokal win and a runner-up finish in the 2022–23 Bundesliga.

On 1 June 2024, he featured in the Champions League final which ended in a 2–0 defeat against Real Madrid. A month later, he acquired the number 10 shirt ahead of the 2024–25 season, a number which was left available after Jadon Sancho departed the club at the expiry of his loan.

In March 2026, it was announced that Brant would leave Dortmund upon the expiration of his contract at the end of the 2025–26 season. On 21 March, he made his 300th appearance for the club in a 3–2 victory over Hamburg.

=== Ajax ===
On 31 July 2026, Brandt joined Eredivisie side Ajax as a free agent, signing a three-year deal.

He made his debut for Ajax on 6 August in the UEFA Conference League third qualifying round, coming on as a substitute in a 3–1 first-leg win over Shelbourne. On 9 August, he played his first league match for Ajax, and scored his first goal for his new club as a substitute in a 2–0 win at Zwolle.

== International career ==
On 17 May 2016, Brandt was named in Germany's preliminary 27-man squad for UEFA Euro 2016.

He was part of the squad for the 2016 Summer Olympics, where Germany won the silver medal.

On 4 June 2018, Brandt was included in Germany's final 23-man squad for the 2018 FIFA World Cup in Russia. On 17 June, Brandt made his first World Cup appearance as a substitute by replacing Timo Werner in the 86th minute in the opening match against Mexico in which they lost 1–0.

On 10 November 2022, he was named in the German squad for the 2022 FIFA World Cup in Qatar.

== Career statistics ==
=== Club ===
As of match played 25 October 2026

Appearances and goals by club, season and competition
Club	Season	League			National cup (Note: Includes DFB-Pokal)		Europe		Other		Total	
Club	Season	Division	Apps	Goals	Apps	Goals	Apps	Goals	Apps	Goals	Apps	Goals
Bayer Leverkusen II	2013–14	Regionalliga West	1	1	—		—		—		1	1
Bayer Leverkusen	2013–14	Bundesliga	12	2	0	0	2 (Note: Appearances in UEFA Champions League)	0	—		14	2
Bayer Leverkusen	2014–15	Bundesliga	25	4	4	0	6	0	—		35	4
Bayer Leverkusen	2015–16	Bundesliga	29	9	3	1	12 (Note: Eight appearances in UEFA Champions League, four appearances in UEFA Europa League)	0	—		44	10
Bayer Leverkusen	2016–17	Bundesliga	32	3	0	0	8	1	—		40	4
Bayer Leverkusen	2017–18	Bundesliga	34	9	5	3	—		—		39	12
Bayer Leverkusen	2018–19	Bundesliga	33	7	3	2	7 (Note: Appearances in UEFA Europa League)	1	—		43	10
Bayer Leverkusen	Total		165	34	15	6	35	2	—		215	42
Borussia Dortmund	2019–20	Bundesliga	33	3	2	2	7	2	0	0	42	7
Borussia Dortmund	2020–21	Bundesliga	31	3	5	0	8	0	1 (Note: Appearance in DFL-Supercup)	1	45	4
Borussia Dortmund	2021–22	Bundesliga	31	9	2	0	7 (Note: Five appearances in UEFA Champions League, two appearances in UEFA Europa League)	0	0	0	40	9
Borussia Dortmund	2022–23	Bundesliga	32	9	3	0	7	1	—		42	10
Borussia Dortmund	2023–24	Bundesliga	32	7	3	1	12	2	—		47	10
Borussia Dortmund	2024–25	Bundesliga	30	5	2	1	13	0	5 (Note: Appearances in FIFA Club World Cup)	0	50	6
Borussia Dortmund	2025–26	Bundesliga	29	7	3	1	9	3	—		41	11
Borussia Dortmund	Total		218	43	20	5	63	8	6	1	307	57
Ajax	2026–27	Eredivisie	10	4	0	0	6 (Note: Appearances in UEFA Conference League)	2	—		16	6
Career total			393	81	35	11	103	11	6	1	538	105

=== International ===
Appearances and goals by national team and year
National team	Year	Apps	Goals
Germany
Germany	2016	4	0
Germany	2017	9	1
Germany	2018	10	1
Germany	2019	8	1
Germany	2020	4	0
Germany	2021	1	0
Germany	2022	3	0
Germany	2023	8	0
Germany	2024	1	0
Total		48	3

Scores and results list Germany's goal tally first.

List of international goals scored by Julian Brandt
No.	Date	Venue	Opponent	Score	Result	Competition
1	10 June 2017	Stadion Nürnberg, Nuremberg, Germany	San Marino	6–0	7–0	2018 FIFA World Cup qualification
2	9 September 2018	Rhein-Neckar-Arena, Sinsheim, Germany	Peru	1–1	2–1	Friendly
3	19 November 2019	Waldstadion, Frankfurt, Germany	Northern Ireland	6–1	6–1	UEFA Euro 2020 qualification

== Honours ==
Borussia Dortmund

- DFB-Pokal: 2020–21
- UEFA Champions League runner-up: 2023–24

Germany U19

- UEFA European Under-19 Championship: 2014

Germany U23

- Summer Olympic Games Silver Medal: 2016

Germany

- FIFA Confederations Cup: 2017

Individual

- Fritz Walter Medal U18 Gold: 2014
- Bundesliga Team of the Season: 2018–19, 2022–23
- Bundesliga Player of the Month: January 2023, February 2023
