= Semih Dağlar =

Turkish footballer

Personal information
- Full name: Semih Dağlar
- Date of birth: 8 January 1993 (age 33)
- Place of birth: Münster, Germany
- Height: 1.77 m (5 ft 10 in)
- Position: Forward

Team information
- Current team: Hammer SpVg
- Number: 9

Youth career
- –2010: Preußen Münster
- 2010–2012: Borussia Dortmund

Senior career*
Years	Team	Apps	(Gls)
2012–2013	SC Wiedenbrück 2000	12	(1)
2013–2014	Preußen Münster II		
2014–2015	SC Roland Beckum	34	(20)
2015–2017	Sportfreunde Lotte	22	(3)
2017–	Hammer SpVg	0	(0)

International career
2010	Turkey U-17	1	(0)
2012	Turkey U-19	2	(0)
- * Club domestic league appearances and goals as of 10:07, 21 December 2016 (UTC)

Semih Dağlar (born 8 January 1993) is a Turkish footballer who plays as a forward for Hammer SpVg.
