= Dennis Engel =

German footballer (born 1995)

Personal information
- Date of birth: 20 October 1995 (age 31)
- Place of birth: Oldenburg, Germany
- Height: 1.84 m (6 ft 0 in)
- Position: Defender

Team information
- Current team: Kickers Emden
- Number: 22

Youth career
- VfB Oldenburg
- –2012: VfL Oldenburg
- 2012–2013: VfB Oldenburg

Senior career*
Years	Team	Apps	(Gls)
2013–2015	VfB Oldenburg II		
2015–2016	VfB Oldenburg	31	(2)
2016–2017	Sportfreunde Lotte	5	(1)
2017–2018	SSV Jeddeloh	22	(2)
2018–2019	SV Rödinghausen	14	(1)
2019–2020	Sportfreunde Lotte	19	(1)
2020–2023	VfB Oldenburg	31	(0)
2023–	Kickers Emden	0	(0)
- * Club domestic league appearances and goals as of 27 May 2023

Dennis Engel (born 20 October 1995) is a German footballer who plays as a defender for Kickers Emden.
