= Jeron Al-Hazaimeh =

German footballer

Personal information
- Date of birth: 13 February 1992 (age 34)
- Place of birth: Düsseldorf, Germany
- Height: 1.94 m (6 ft 4 in)
- Position: Defender

Team information
- Current team: TuS Bövinghausen
- Number: 25

Youth career
- 2007–2011: Fortuna Düsseldorf

Senior career*
| Years | Team | Apps | (Gls) |
| 2011–2012 | Fortuna Düsseldorf II | 51 | (1) |
| 2012 | Fortuna Düsseldorf | 0 | (0) |
| 2013–2014 | Chemnitzer FC | 12 | (0) |
| 2014–2016 | Sportfreunde Lotte | 61 | (11) |
| 2016–2018 | Preußen Münster | 62 | (6) |
| 2018–2020 | Sportfreunde Lotte | 37 | (1) |
| 2020–2022 | SV Meppen | 56 | (1) |
| 2022–2023 | Wuppertaler SV | 9 | (0) |
| 2023– | TuS Bövinghausen | 16 | (5) |
- * Club domestic league appearances and goals as of 20:40, 13 December 2023 (UTC)

Jeron Al-Hazaimeh (born 13 February 1992) is a German professional footballer who plays as a defender for TuS Bövinghausen.

== Early life ==
Al-Hazaimeh was born to German parents Winfried and Angelika; his mother was previously married to a Jordanian man, taking his surname, and had four children with him. As she wanted all her children to have the same surname, she passed it to Jeron as well.

Both his parents were footballers, with his father having played at Fortuna Düsseldorf.

== Career ==
Al-Hazaimeh joined Oberliga Westfallen club TuS Bövinghausen in summer 2023. In December the club announced it had given up on its target of promotion to the Regionalliga and that Al-Hazaimeh would be one of 14 players to leave during the winter break.
