= Massih Wassey =

Footballer (born 1988)

Personal information
- Date of birth: 18 June 1988 (age 38)
- Place of birth: Münster, West Germany
- Height: 1.88 m (6 ft 2 in)
- Position: Midfielder

Team information
- Current team: Westfalia Kinderhaus
- Number: 27

Youth career
- 1996–2001: ESV Münster
- 2001–2003: VfL Wolbeck
- 2003–2004: Preußen Münster
- 2004–2005: Rot-Weiss Ahlen
- 2005–2006: VfL Wolfsburg
- 2006–2007: Preußen Münster

Senior career*
Years	Team	Apps	(Gls)
2007–2009	Preußen Münster	49	(8)
2009–2011	Schalke 04 II	28	(4)
2011	Fortuna Düsseldorf II	13	(1)
2011–2012	Eintracht Rheine		
2012–2013	Waldhof Mannheim	44	(8)
2013–2016	SC Wiedenbrück	88	(24)
2016–2017	Borussia Dortmund II	33	(6)
2017–2019	SC Paderborn	29	(8)
2019–2020	SC Paderborn II	9	(2)
2020–2021	Sportfreunde Lotte	5	(0)
2021–	Westfalia Kinderhaus		

International career
2010	Canada	2	(0)
- * Club domestic league appearances and goals as of 1 July 2021

Massih Wassey (born 18 June 1988) is a professional soccer player who plays as a midfielder for Westfalia Kinderhaus. Born in West Germany, he made two appearances for the Canada national team.

== Career ==
Wassey began his career in his hometown for ESV Münster in 1996 and signed for VfL Wolbeck in June 2001. After spending two years in VfL Wolbeck's youth squad, Wassey was scouted by Preußen Münster in the summer of 2003. After playing for only half a year, Wassey joined the youth squad of Rot-Weiss Ahlen in January 2004, and then signed a youth contract for VfL Wolfsburg in July 2005.

After this, Wassey returned to the youth squad of Preußen Münster, and was promoted to the senior squad after one year. After two years in the senior squad of Preußen Münster, Massih signed for FC Schalke 04 in July 2005. Wassey was the regular playmaker for the reserve team. On 2 February 2011, he signed for Fortuna Düsseldorf II. After half a season each with Fortuna, then Eintracht Rheine, he signed for SV Waldhof Mannheim in January 2012. Eighteen months later he signed for SC Wiedenbrück 2000.

Massey moved to SC Paderborn 07 in summer 2017.

== International career ==
Wassey made his debut for the Canada national team in a friendly match against Jamaica on 31 January 2010.

== Personal life ==
Wassey was born to an Afghan mother and a Canadian father in Münster. He holds Canadian and German citizenship.

== Honours ==
- 2009: Westfalenpokal
- 2008: Westfalenpokal
- 2008: Oberliga Westfalen
