= Tim Gorschlüter =

German footballer

Personal information
- Date of birth: 24 August 1983 (age 43)
- Place of birth: Hamm, West Germany
- Height: 1.76 m (5 ft 9 in)
- Position: Defender

Youth career
- Sportfreunde Bockum
- –2001: Hammer SpVgg
- 2001–2002: Rot Weiss Ahlen

Senior career*
Years	Team	Apps	(Gls)
2002–2005	Rot Weiss Ahlen	22	(1)
2005–2006	Rot-Weiss Essen	14	(0)
2006–2007	Rot Weiss Ahlen	33	(0)
2007–2008	Rot-Weiss Essen	34	(1)
2008–2009	Sportfreunde Lotte	23	(5)
2009–2010	Rot Weiss Ahlen	18	(1)
2010–2018	Sportfreunde Lotte	154	(6)
- * Club domestic league appearances and goals

Tim Gorschlüter (born 24 August 1983) is a retired German footballer who played as a defender.

== Career ==
=== Early career ===
Born in Hamm, Gorschlüter began his career in the youth from Sportfreunde Bockum and joined later to Hammer SpVgg and signed in January 2002 with Rot Weiss Ahlen.

=== Professional career ===
Gorschlüter began his professional career for Rot Weiss Ahlen in the 2. Bundesliga in the 2001–02 season. After four years with Ahlen in the 2. Bundesliga, he moved for one year to Rot-Weiss Essen during the summer of 2005 and returned to Rot Weiss Ahlen in the following year.

After having played 33 games in one year, Gorschlüter rejoined in summer 2007 Rot-Weiss Essen. In the 2008–09 season, he signed for the Regionalliga West club Sportfreunde Lotte.

On 14 April 2009, Gorschlüter signed a one-year contract with his former club Rot Weiss Ahlen. On 19 May 2010, he confirmed his return from Rot-Weiss Ahlen to Sportfreunde Lotte and signed a one-year contract with the Münsterländer club.
