= Darryl Geurts =

German footballer

Personal information
- Full name: Darryl Julian Geurts
- Date of birth: 5 July 1994 (age 32)
- Place of birth: Hangelsberg, Germany
- Height: 1.78 m (5 ft 10 in)
- Position: Left winger

Team information
- Current team: SV Tasmania Berlin
- Number: 11

Youth career
- Union Fürstenwalde
- –2008: Frankfurter FC Viktoria
- 2008–2013: Energie Cottbus

Senior career*
Years	Team	Apps	(Gls)
2012–2013	Energie Cottbus II	18	(2)
2013–2014	Holstein Kiel II	19	(9)
2014–2017	Union Fürstenwalde	74	(25)
2017–2018	SC Paderborn	3	(0)
2017–2018	SC Paderborn II	16	(7)
2018–2019	Rot-Weiß Erfurt	22	(3)
2019	VfR Aalen	0	(0)
2019–2021	Union Fürstenwalde	35	(17)
2021–2023	BFC Dynamo	46	(9)
2023–	SV Tasmania Berlin	4	
- * Club domestic league appearances and goals as of 19 September 2023

Darryl Julian Geurts (born 5 July 1994) is a German footballer who plays as a left winger for SV Tasmania Berlin.

== Career ==
On 13 June 2019 VfR Aalen announced, that Geurts would join the club from the 2019/20 season. Before VfR Aalen had received his rights, Geurts regret the transfer and was instead set to join FSV Union Fürstenwalde.
