= Marcel Kaffenberger =

German footballer

Personal information
- Full name: Marcel Kaffenberger
- Date of birth: 12 March 1994 (age 32)
- Place of birth: Frankfurt, Germany
- Height: 1.87 m (6 ft 2 in)
- Position: Defensive midfielder

Team information
- Current team: FC Eddersheim (assistant)

Youth career
- 1999–2003: FC Eddersheim
- 2003–2006: Eintracht Frankfurt
- 2006–2009: 1. FSV Mainz 05
- 2009–2013: FSV Frankfurt

Senior career*
Years	Team	Apps	(Gls)
2013–2015	FSV Frankfurt	3	(0)
2013–2014	→ FSV Frankfurt II	30	(6)
2015–2016	Chemnitzer FC	13	(1)
2016–2017	Sportfreunde Lotte	13	(0)
2018–2020	Rot-Weiß Erfurt	26	(0)

Managerial career
- 2020–: FC Eddersheim (assistant)
- 2020: FC Eddersheim (caretaker)
- * Club domestic league appearances and goals

Marcel Kaffenberger (born 12 March 1994) is a German retired footballer who played as a defensive midfielder. He is currently the assistant coach of FC Eddersheim.

== Club career ==
=== Early career and FSV Frankfurt ===
Kaffenberger started playing football in Hattersheim at the district club FC Eddersheim. At the age of nine he moved to Eintracht Frankfurt before he was recruited by 1. FSV Mainz 05 in 2006.

After three years, however, he returned to Frankfurt and joined FSV Frankfurt. In his second season in the club, the central midfielder became the captain of the U-19s. After that, Kaffenberger was also included in the first team squad of the FSV in the 2. Bundesliga in his last U19 year. On the fifth match day, he sat on the bench as a substitute for the first time and in a friendly match in October 2012 he played 90 minutes for the professional team. He got his 2. Bundesliga debut on 8 March 2013, when he was substituted on for the last ten minutes in the home game against VfR Aalen when the score was 5–0.

In the following two season, he only made two league appearances in total. Kaffenberger's contract with FSV Frankfurt, which ran until 2015, was not extended.

=== Later career ===
On 20 June 2015, his move to Chemnitzer FC was announced, where he signed a two-year contract.

For the 2016/17 season he moved to league competitor Sportfreunde Lotte, with whom he received a one-year contract. After his contract was not extended after the end of the season, Kaffenberger was initially without a club.

During the winter break of the 2017/18 season, he joined the bottom of the table, FC Rot-Weiß Erfurt, and played 12 games there. After the insolvency and the relegation of the club to the Regionalliga Nordost, Kaffenberger goes into the 2018/19 season as captain of a completely reformed Erfurt team. Besides Morten Rüdiger, he was the only player from the previous year's squad that has remained with the club.

Due to many injuries, Kaffenberger ended his active career in May 2020 after Rot-Weiß Erfurt filed for bankruptcy in January 2020 and stopped playing.

== Coaching career ==
After retiring, Kaffenberger returned to his childhood club FC Eddersheim, where he was hired as an assistant coach. When head coach Rouven Leopold was fired on 28 October 2020, Kaffenberger and Peter Rufa took temporarily charge of the team until the new head coach was hired from January 2020.
