= Felix Herzenbruch =

German footballer (born 1992)

Personal information
- Date of birth: 8 August 1992 (age 34)
- Place of birth: Wuppertal, Germany
- Height: 1.84 m (6 ft 0 in)
- Positions: Centre-back; left-back

Team information
- Current team: Wuppertaler SV
- Number: 3

Youth career
- –2002: SV Jägerhaus Linde
- 2002–2011: Wuppertaler SV

Senior career*
Years	Team	Apps	(Gls)
2011–2013	Wuppertaler SV	45	(2)
2013–2016	Rot-Weiß Oberhausen	88	(0)
2013–2016	Rot-Weiß Oberhausen II	2	(0)
2016–2019	SC Paderborn	43	(0)
2019–2023	Rot-Weiss Essen	93	(5)
2019–2020	→ Rot-Weiß Oberhausen (loan)	18	(0)
2024–2026	SSVg Velbert	79	(2)
2026–	Wuppertaler SV	3	(0)
- * Club domestic league appearances and goals as of 27 September 2026

Felix Herzenbruch (born 8 August 1992) is a German professional footballer who plays as a centre-back or left-back for Wuppertaler SV.

== Career ==
Herzenbruch made his professional debut for SC Paderborn in the first round of the DFB-Pokal against 2. Bundesliga club SV Sandhausen on 22 August 2016, losing 2–1.
