= Tobias Schilk =

German footballer (born 1992)

Personal information
- Date of birth: 24 March 1992 (age 34)
- Place of birth: Munich, Germany
- Height: 1.83 m (6 ft 0 in)
- Position: Defender

Team information
- Current team: Greuther Fürth (youth manager)

Senior career*
Years	Team	Apps	(Gls)
2010–2011	1860 Munich II	5	(0)
2011–2012	1. FC Heidenheim	15	(0)
2012–2016	Mainz 05 II	101	(1)
2016–2021	Hallescher FC	86	(0)

Managerial career
- 2021–2022: Greuther Fürth (U19 assistant)
- 2022–: Greuther Fürth (youth)
- * Club domestic league appearances and goals

Tobias Schilk (born 24 March 1992) is a German professional football coach and a former defender. He is the coach for youth team of Greuther Fürth.

== Career ==
Born in Munich, Schilk began playing football for the youth side of TSV 1860 Munich. He played in the Regionalliga for the club's reserve team before joining 1. FC Heidenheim in the 3. Liga for the 2011–12 season. In January 2012, he signed for 1. FSV Mainz 05.
