= Bijan Kaffenberger =

German politician (born 1989)

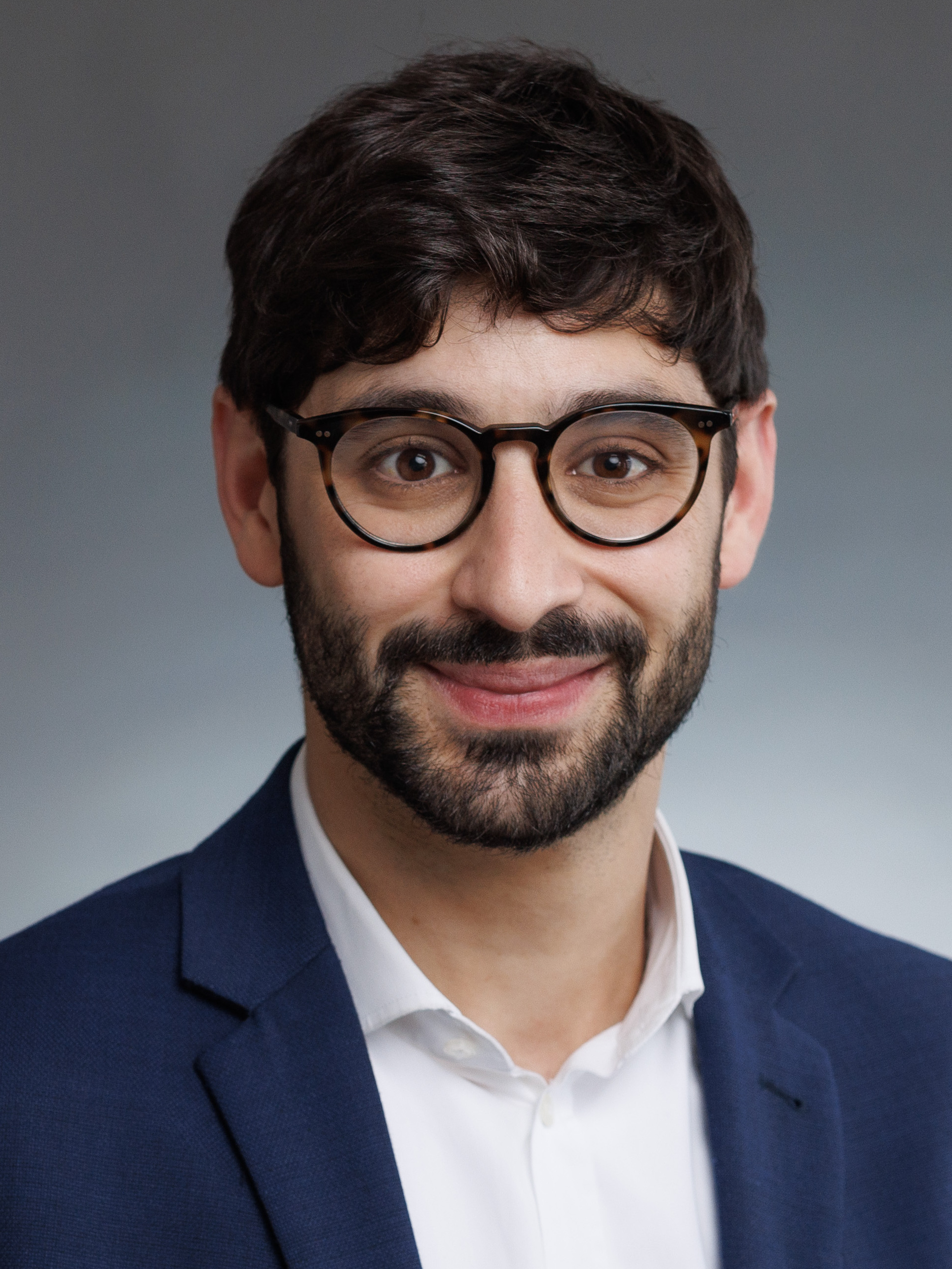
- Kaffenberger in 2022

Member of the Landtag of Hesse
- Incumbent
- Assumed office 18 January 2019

Personal details
- Born: 25 May 1989 (age 36)
- Party: Social Democratic Party (since 2007)

Bijan Kaffenberger (born 25 May 1989) is a German politician serving as a member of the Landtag of Hesse since 2024. He has served as chairman of the Social Democratic Party in Darmstadt since 2024.
