= Leon Fesser =

German footballer

Personal information
- Full name: Leon-Hendrik Fesser
- Date of birth: 1 September 1994 (age 32)
- Place of birth: Darmstadt, Germany
- Height: 1.92 m (6 ft 4 in)
- Position: Centre back

Youth career
- FC Alsbach
- Darmstadt 98
- FSV Frankfurt
- –2011: Eintracht Frankfurt
- 2011–2012: Kickers Offenbach
- 2012–2013: 1899 Hoffenheim

Senior career*
Years	Team	Apps	(Gls)
2013–2016	1899 Hoffenheim II	51	(0)
2016–2017	Bayern Munich II	25	(0)
2017–2019	SC Paderborn II	14	(3)
2017–2019	SC Paderborn	5	(1)
- * Club domestic league appearances and goals as of 23:31, 8 August 2019 (UTC)

Leon-Hendrik Fesser (born 1 September 1994) is a German footballer who plays as a centre back, most recently for SC Paderborn.
