= Mattia Trianni =

German footballer

Personal information
- Date of birth: 16 January 1993 (age 33)
- Place of birth: Heilbronn, Germany
- Height: 1.82 m (6 ft 0 in)
- Position: Winger

Youth career
- VfL Neckargartach
- Union Böckingen
- Heilbronner SpVgg
- FC Heilbronn
- VfB Stuttgart
- 1899 Hoffenheim
- Stuttgarter Kickers

Senior career*
| Years | Team | Apps | (Gls) |
| 2012–2013 | 1. CfR Pforzheim | | |
| 2013–2014 | 1. FC Bruchsal | | |
| 2014–2015 | Schwarz-Weiß Rehden | 16 | (2) |
| 2015 | TSG Neustrelitz | 9 | (3) |
| 2015 | TSG Neustrelitz II | 1 | (0) |
| 2015–2017 | Viktoria Berlin | 48 | (12) |
| 2017–2019 | VfR Aalen | 33 | (1) |
| 2019 | Reno 1868 | 1 | (0) |
| 2020 | SV Babelsberg 03 | 3 | (0) |
| 2021–2023 | Atlas Delmenhorst | 54 | (14) |
| 2023– | SSV Reutlingen | 30 | (4) |
- * Club domestic league appearances and goals as of 02:46, 4 July 2024 (UTC)

Mattia Trianni (born 16 January 1993) is a German footballer who most recently played as a winger for SSV Reutlingen.
