= Marco Kaffenberger =

German footballer

Personal information
- Date of birth: 9 July 1996 (age 30)
- Place of birth: Lindenfels, Germany
- Height: 1.85 m (6 ft 1 in)
- Position: Defender

Team information
- Current team: SV Unter-Flockenbach
- Number: 24

Youth career
- KSV Reichelsheim
- –2011: Darmstadt 98
- 2011–2013: 1. FC Kaiserslautern
- 2013–2014: FSV Frankfurt
- 2014–2015: Eintracht Braunschweig

Senior career*
| Years | Team | Apps | (Gls) |
| 2015–2016 | Eintracht Braunschweig II | 18 | (0) |
| 2016–2017 | Stuttgarter Kickers | 28 | (0) |
| 2017–2019 | Werder Bremen II | 13 | (0) |
| 2019–2022 | Schwarz-Weiß Rehden | 37 | (1) |
| 2022– | SV Unter-Flockenbach | 19 | (1) |
- * Club domestic league appearances and goals as of 12 November 2022

Marco Kaffenberger (born 9 July 1996) is a German footballer who plays as a defender for Hessenliga club SV Unter-Flockenbach.
