= Alexander Hettich =

German footballer

Personal information
- Full name: Alexander Hettich
- Date of birth: 11 March 1988 (age 38)
- Place of birth: Germany
- Height: 1.82 m (6 ft 0 in)
- Position: Midfielder

Team information
- Current team: VfR Marienhagen (playing assistant)

Youth career
- VfL Gummersbach
- –2007: Bayer Leverkusen

Senior career*
| Years | Team | Apps | (Gls) |
| 2007–2009 | Bayer Leverkusen II | 8 | (2) |
| 2008 | → KFC Uerdingen (loan) | 0 | (0) |
| 2009–2011 | Germania Windeck | 33 | (8) |
| 2011–2014 | Sportfreunde Siegen | 88 | (36) |
| 2014–2015 | Carl Zeiss Jena | 17 | (6) |
| 2015–2017 | Sportfreunde Lotte | 31 | (3) |
| 2017– | VfR Marienhagen | 10 | (8) |

Managerial career
- 2017–: VfR Marienhagen (playing assistant)
- * Club domestic league appearances and goals as of 25 August 2017

Alexander Hettich (born 11 March 1988) is a German footballer who plays as a midfielder for VfR Marienhagen 1930.
