= Matthias Stingl =

German footballer

Personal information
- Full name: Matthias Stingl
- Date of birth: 27 February 1998 (age 28)
- Place of birth: Deggendorf, Germany
- Height: 1.78 m (5 ft 10 in)
- Position: Right-back

Team information
- Current team: UMass Lowell River Hawks
- Number: 6

Youth career
- SV Winzer
- FC Vilshofen
- –2012: Grün-Weiss Deggendorf
- 2012–2017: Bayern Munich

College career
| Years | Team | Apps | (Gls) |
| 2020– | UMass Lowell River Hawks | 39 | (2) |

Senior career*
| Years | Team | Apps | (Gls) |
| 2016 | Bayern Munich II | 1 | (0) |
| 2017–2018 | SC Paderborn II | 11 | (0) |
| 2017–2018 | SC Paderborn | 4 | (0) |
| 2018–2020 | Wacker Burghausen | 39 | (0) |

International career
| 2013 | Germany U15 | 2 | (0) |
| 2013 | Germany U16 | 1 | (0) |
- * Club domestic league appearances and goals as of 16:55, 10 December 2023 (UTC)

Matthias Stingl (born 27 February 1998) is a German footballer who plays as a right-back for American college team UMass Lowell River Hawks.
