= Stadion am Lotter Kreuz =

Football stadium in Lotte, Germany

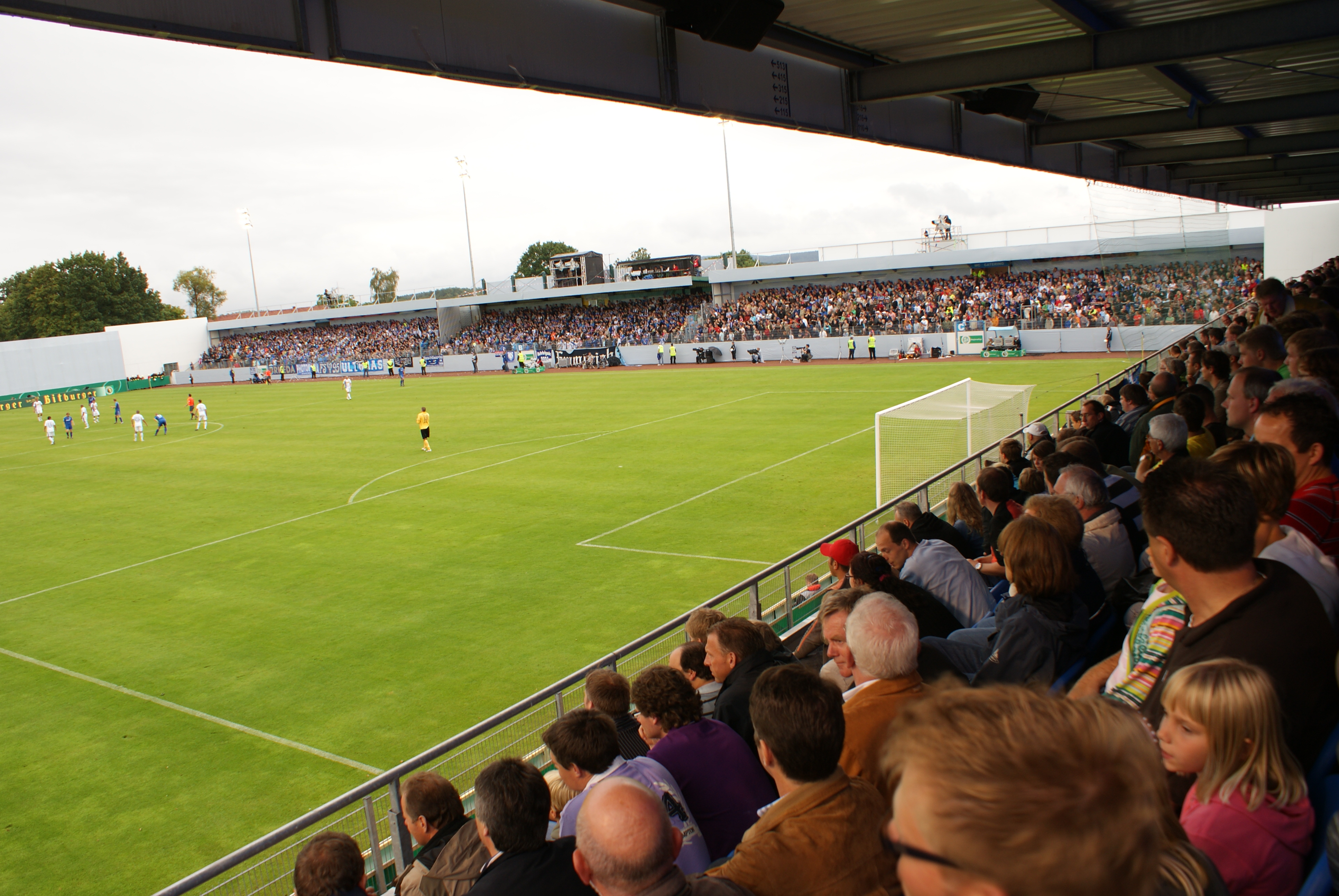
- Interactive map of Stadion am Lotter Kreuz
- Full name: Stadion am Lotter Kreuz
- Former names: PGW Arena; SolarTechnics-Arena connectM-Arena; Sportpark am Lotter Kreuz; FRIMO Stadion
- Location: Lotte, Germany
- Coordinates: 52°16′35″N 7°55′00″E
- Owner: Sportfreunde Lotte
- Capacity: 10,059
- Surface: Grass
- Field size: 105 x 68

Construction
- Opened: July 19, 1986

Tenant
- Sportfreunde Lotte

Website
- Official website

Stadion am Lotter Kreuz is a multi-use stadium in Lotte, Germany. It is currently used mostly for football matches and is the home stadium of Sportfreunde Lotte. The stadium currently has a capacity of 10,059 spectators and opened in 1929.

== Gallery ==
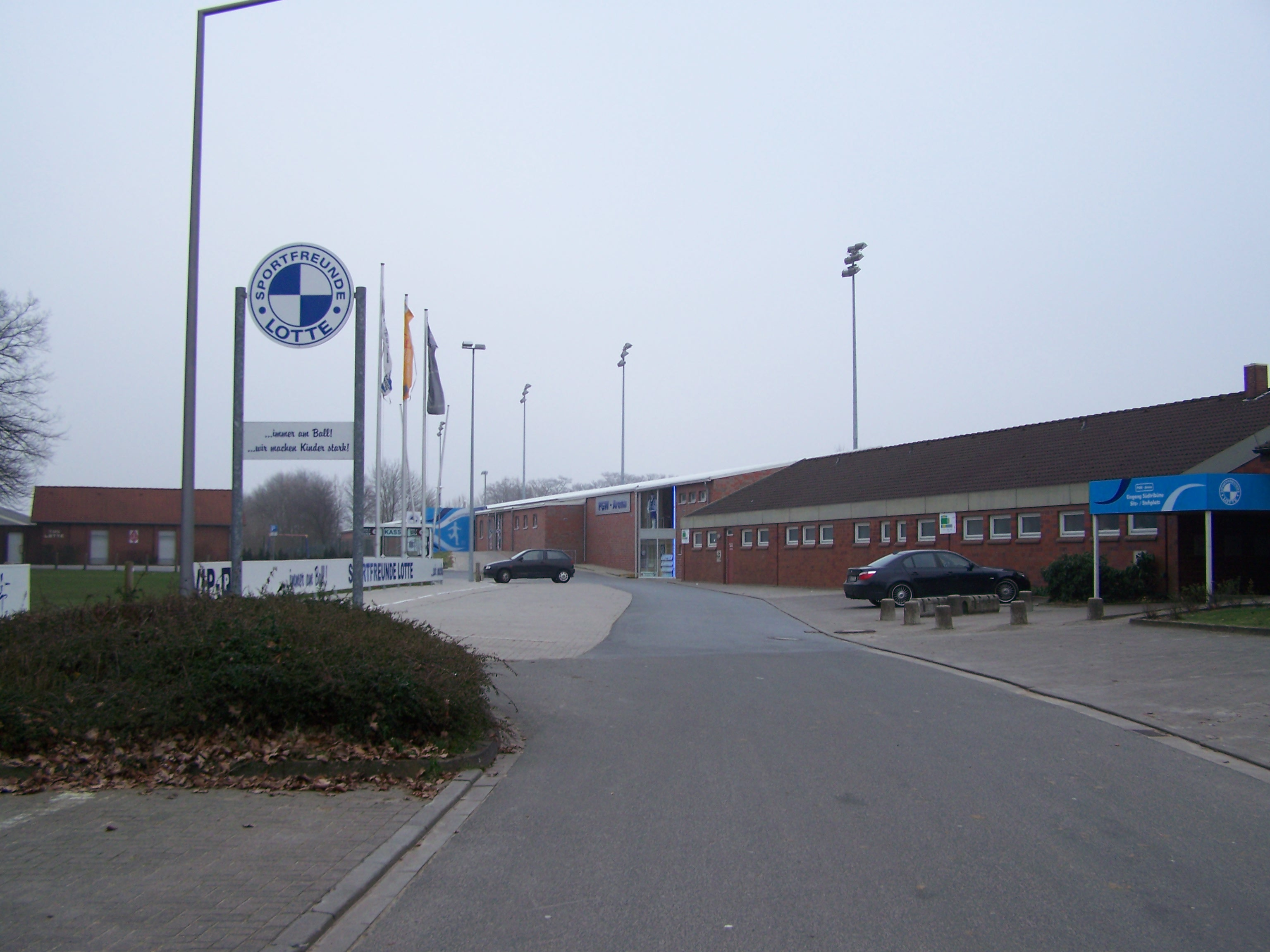
Sportpark am Lotter Kreuz (2007)

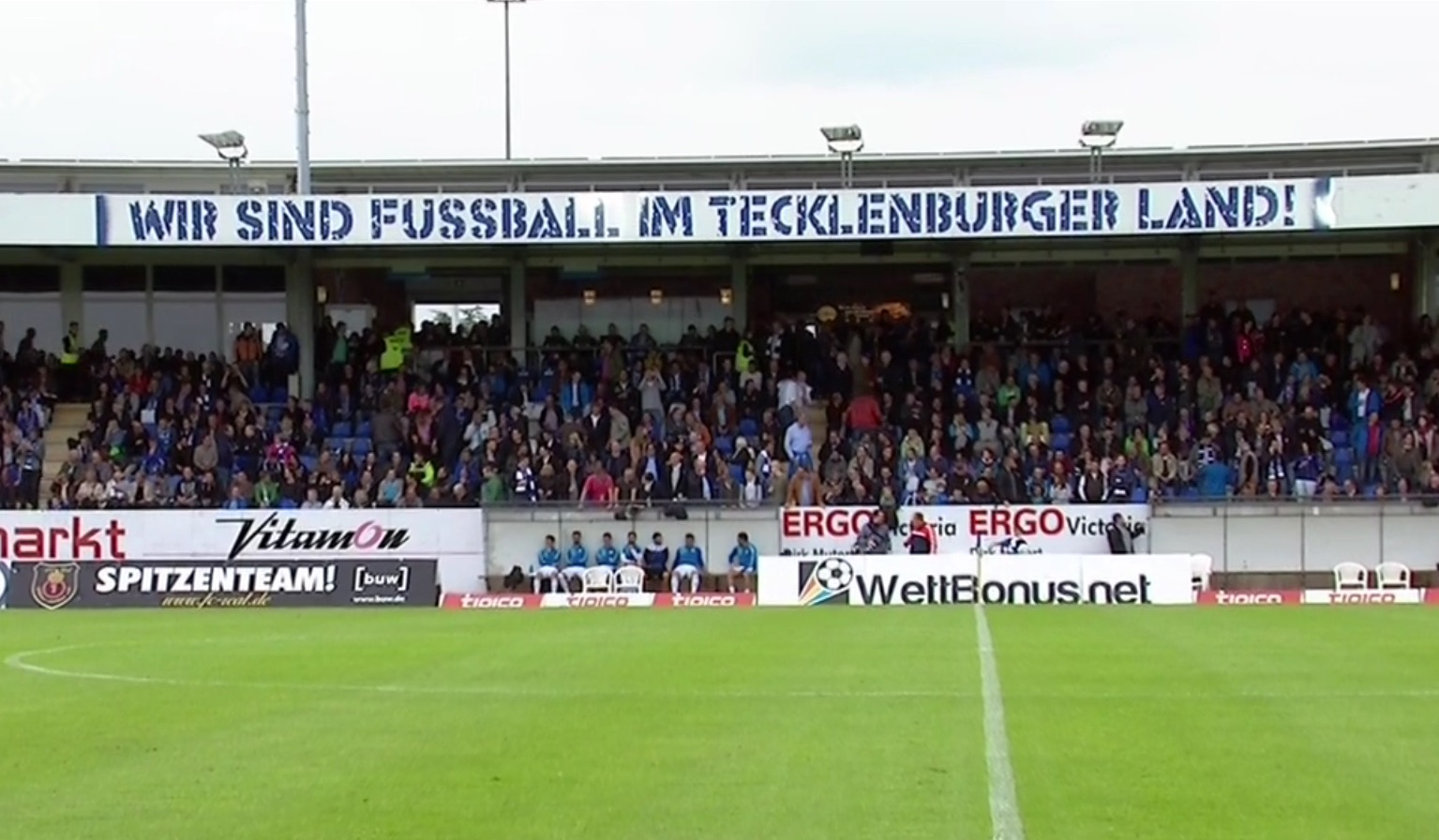
The main stand in May 2016
