= Alexander Langlitz =

German footballer

Personal information
- Date of birth: 15 February 1991 (age 35)
- Place of birth: Olgino, Soviet Union
- Height: 1.83 m (6 ft 0 in)
- Position: Midfielder

Youth career
- 1997–2005: BSV Ostbevern
- 2005–2006: SG Telgte
- 2006–2009: Preußen Münster
- 2009–2010: Schalke 04

Senior career*
Years	Team	Apps	(Gls)
2010–2013	Schalke 04 II	95	(12)
2011–2013	Schalke 04	0	(0)
2013–2014	Rot-Weiss Essen	27	(2)
2014–2020	Sportfreunde Lotte	175	(11)
2020–2023	Preußen Münster	91	(21)
- * Club domestic league appearances and goals

Alexander Langlitz (born 15 February 1991) is a German former footballer who played as a midfielder.

== Career ==
Langlitz was born in Olgino in the Soviet Union. On 14 December 2011, he made his first senior appearance for the club as a substitute for José Manuel Jurado in a Europa League clash against Israeli Premier League team Maccabi Haifa which Schalke won 3–1. He signed for Rot-Weiss Essen in July 2013 and joined Sportfreunde Lotte a year later.
