= Kevin Rodrigues-Pires =

Portuguese footballer

Personal information
- Date of birth: 12 September 1991 (age 35)
- Place of birth: Cologne, Germany
- Height: 1.70 m (5 ft 7 in)
- Position: Midfielder

Youth career
- Fortuna Köln
- Bayer Leverkusen
- 1. FC Köln
- 2005–2010: Alemannia Aachen

Senior career*
Years	Team	Apps	(Gls)
2009	Alemannia Aachen II	2	(0)
2010–2012	Schalke 04 II	45	(5)
2012–2014	Rot-Weiss Essen	60	(12)
2014–2015	Sportfreunde Lotte	26	(3)
2015	TSV Steinbach	15	(1)
2016–2018	Sportfreunde Lotte	61	(5)
2018–2020	Preußen Münster	66	(3)
2020–2024	Wuppertaler SV	100	(14)
2024	Fortuna Köln	13	(1)
2024	Eintracht Hohkeppel	8	(0)

International career
2009	Portugal U18	3	(0)
- * Club domestic league appearances and goals as of 28 September 2024

Kevin Rodrigues-Pires (born 12 September 1991) is a professional footballer who plays as a midfielder. Born in Germany, he represented Portugal at youth international level.

== Early life ==
He played youth football with Fortuna Köln, Bayer Leverkusen, 1. FC Köln, and Alemannia Aachen.

== Club career ==
In 2009, he made his senior debut for Alemannia Aachen II.

In 2010, he joined Schalke 04 II in the fourth tier Regionalliga West. He spent two seasons with the club.

In 2012, he moved to Rot-Weiss Essen, where he played two seasons. On 14 March 2014 he scored two goals against SSVg Velbert 02. In May 2014, he departed the club.

In 2014, he joined Sportfreunde Lotte.

In August 2015, he joined TSV Steinbach in the Regionalliga Südwest.

In January 2016 Sportfreunde Lotte. On 22 March 2017, he tore a ligament, causing him to miss several months of action. In September 2017, he re-tore the ligament after returning to training two weeks earlier, however, he would not require surgery.

He then joined Preußen Münster in the summer of 2018. He signed a contract until June 2020.

He returned to the fourth tier in the summer of 2020 with Wuppertaler SV. He made his debut in an exhibition match against fifth tier Oberliga side SSVg Velbert 02. He serves as team captain. His contract was set to expire at the end of June 2022, but he extended it for another season.

In January 2024, he joined SC Fortuna Köln in the same division.

In June 2024, he signed with newly promoted club Eintracht Hohkeppel in the Regionalliga West. In early October 2024, he departed the club, as the club parted ways with six players following the club's poor performance in the early part of the season.

== International career ==
In 2009, he made three appearances with the Portugal U18 team.
