= Daniel Latkowski =

German footballer

Personal information
- Date of birth: 11 November 1991 (age 34)
- Place of birth: Porto, Portugal
- Height: 1.78 m (5 ft 10 in)
- Position: Right midfielder

Team information
- Current team: SV Rödinghausen
- Number: 25

Youth career
- Eintracht Rulle
- SC Achmer
- –2010: VfL Osnabrück

Senior career*
Years	Team	Apps	(Gls)
2009–2013	VfL Osnabrück II	54	(13)
2010–2013	VfL Osnabrück	32	(1)
2013–2015	SV Meppen	51	(7)
2015–2016	Sportfreunde Lotte	6	(0)
2016–2017	SC Wiedenbrück 2000	28	(4)
2017–	SV Rödinghausen	4	(0)
- * Club domestic league appearances and goals as of 3 September 2017

Daniel Latkowski (born 11 November 1991) is a German footballer who plays for SV Rödinghausen. He began his career with VfL Osnabrück and made his debut for the club on the opening day of the 2011–12 season, as a substitute for Gerrit Wegkamp in a 1–0 away win over SV Darmstadt 98. He signed for SV Meppen in August 2013.
