= Lotte, Germany =

Lotte
- Town
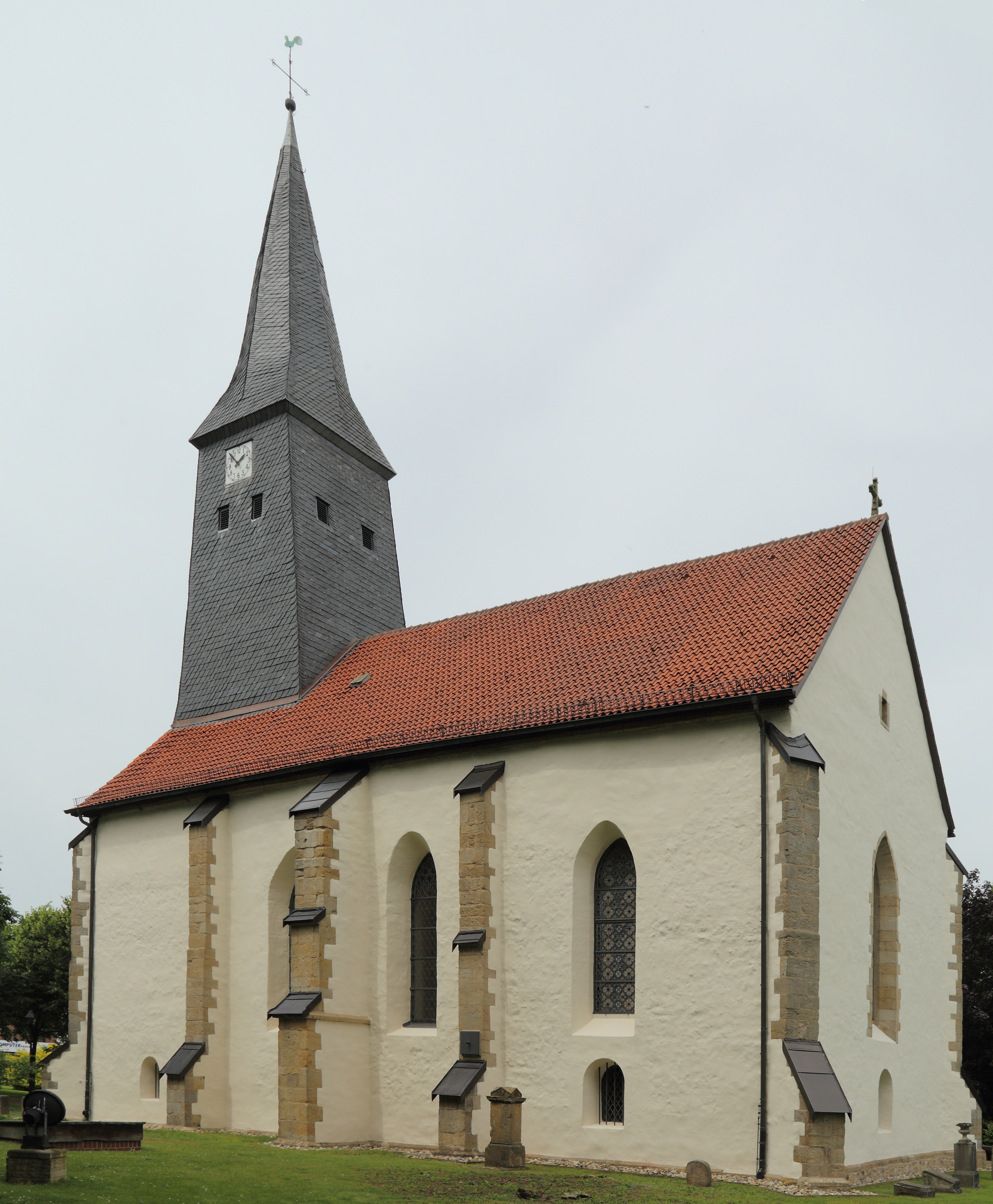
- Soest

- Coat of arms

- Location of Lotte within Steinfurt district
- Interactive map of Lotte
- Location within Germany Location within North Rhine-Westphalia
- Coordinates: 52°16′35″N 7°55′00″E
- Country: Germany
- State: North Rhine-Westphalia
- Admin. region: Münster
- District: Steinfurt
- Subdivisions: 5

Government
  - Mayor (2020–25): Rainer Lammers (Ind.)

Area
  - Total: 37.69 km^{2} (14.55 sq mi)
- Elevation: 66 m (217 ft)

Population (2025-12-31)
  - Total: 13,728
  - Density: 364.2/km^{2} (943.4/sq mi)
- Time zone: UTC+01:00 (CET)
  - Summer (DST): UTC+02:00 (CEST)
- Postal codes: 49504
- Dialling codes: 05404; 0541 (Büren); 05405 (Osterberg)
- Vehicle registration: ST
- Website: www.lotte.de

Lotte (German pronunciation: [ˈlɔtə]) is a municipality in the district of Steinfurt, in North Rhine-Westphalia, Germany.

== Geography ==
Lotte is situated on the north side of the Teutoburg Forest, close to the border of Lower Saxony and approximately 10 km west of Osnabrück.

=== Division of the town ===
The municipality consists of 5 districts:

- Bueren
- Wersen
- Halen
- Alt Lotte
- Osterberg

== Population ==
Historical population

Year	Pop.	±% p.a.
1965	7,313	—
1970	8,389	+2.78%
1975	9,876	+3.32%
1980	10,664	+1.55%
1985	10,307	−0.68%
1990	10,593	+0.55%
1995	11,594	+1.82%

Year	Pop.	±% p.a.
2000	12,974	+2.27%
2005	13,677	+1.06%
2010	13,912	+0.34%
2015	14,175	+0.38%
2020	14,139	−0.05%
2025	13,728	−0.59%

Source: Landesdatabank Nordrhein-Westfalen

== Sports ==
The town plays host to football club Sportfreunde Lotte, who currently play in the Regionalliga West after promotion from the Oberliga Westfalen in 2024. They have previously played as high as the 3. Liga, and in 2017, they reached the quarterfinals of the 2016–17 DFB-Pokal.
