= Sportfreunde Lotte =

German football club

- Full name: Verein für Laufspiele Sportfreunde; Lotte e.V. von 1929
- Nickname: Blau-Weiß
- Founded: 1929; 97 years ago
- Ground: Stadion am Lotter Kreuz
- Capacity: 10,059
- Chairman: Hans-Ulrich Saatkamp
- Manager: Nadir Sönmez
- League: Regionalliga West (IV)
- 2025–26: Regionalliga West, 11th of 17
- Website: http://www.sf-lotte.de/
Home colours	Away colours

VfL Sportfreunde Lotte is a German association football club from Lotte, North Rhine-Westphalia. The football team is part of a sports club with approximately 1400 members and departments for handball, walking, gymnastics, and swimming, as well as other activities.

== History ==
The association was established as the gymnastics club Turnverein Lotte in 1929. After World War II the club was re-established as VfL Sportfreunde Lotte on 9 February 1946 and was built around football and handball departments.

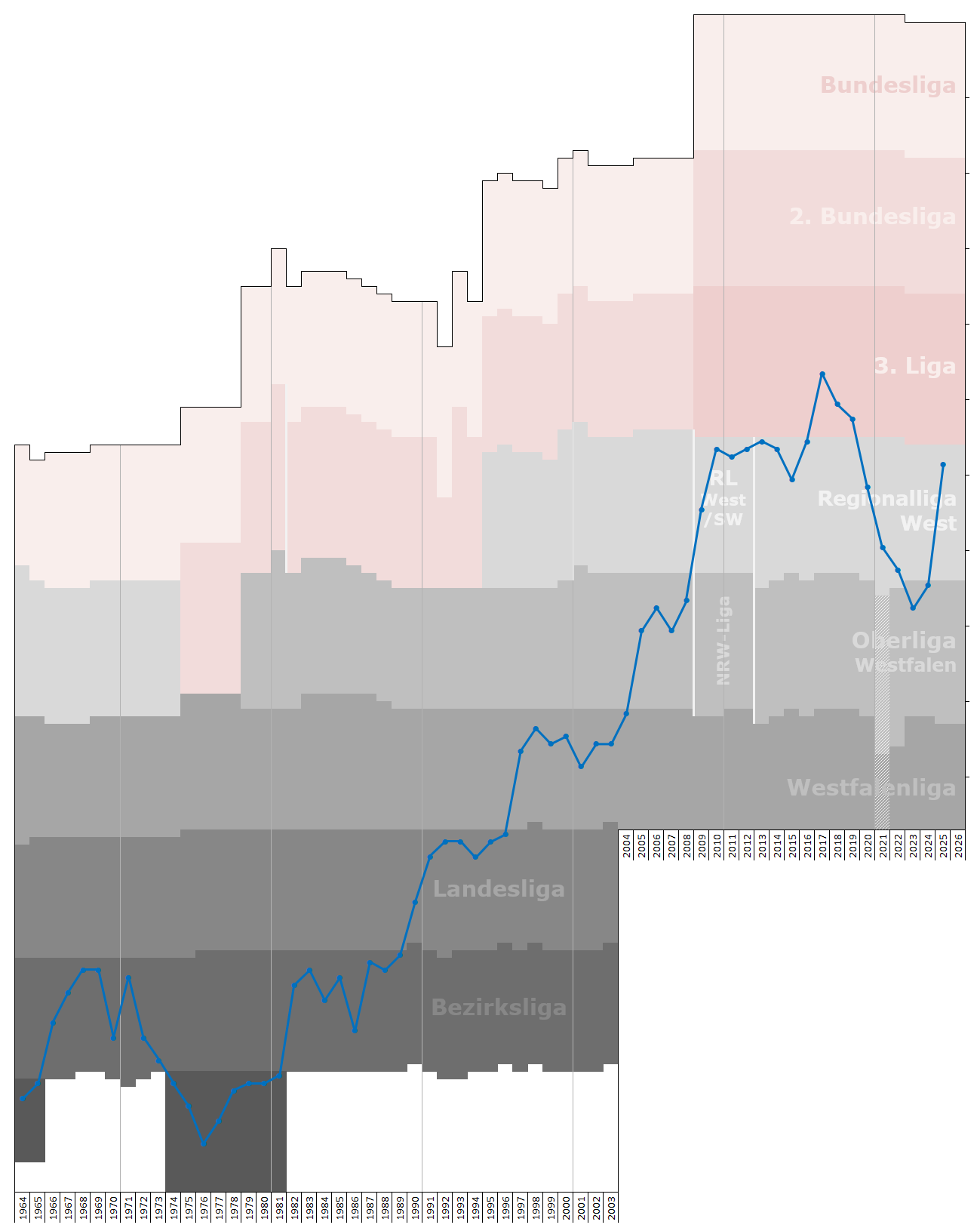
Historical chart of Sportfreunde Lotte league performance

Lotte reached the Verbandsliga Westfalen (V) in 1996 and after a title there in 2004 were promoted to the Oberliga Westfalen (IV), later Regionalliga West. They won that league in 2012–13 but lost the promotion play-off to RB Leipzig. In 2013–14, the club finished in second place. They won the Regionalliga West once more in 2015–16 and, after defeating Waldhof Mannheim in the play-off, earned promotion to the 3. Liga for the first time. On 18 May 2019, they were relegated back to the Regionalliga.

Sportfreunde plays their home matches in the Frimo Stadion (formerly the Sportpark am Lotter Kreuz) which holds 10,059 spectators.

== Honours ==
The club's honours:

- Regionalliga West (IV)
  - Champions: 2013, 2016
- Oberliga Westfalen (V)
  - Champions: 2024
- Verbandsliga Westfalen (V)
  - Champions: 2004
- Landesliga Westfalen
  - Champions: 1996
- Bezirksliga Westfalen
  - Champions: 1989
- Westphalia Cup
  - Winners: 2015

== Players ==
=== Current squad ===
As of 8 September 2026

Note: Flags indicate national team as defined under FIFA eligibility rules; some limited exceptions apply. Players may hold more than one non-FIFA nationality.

No.	Pos.	Nation	Player
1	GK	GER	Laurenz Beckemeyer
3	DF	GER	Johann Deumi-Nappi
4	MF	ENG	Ayodele Ojo
5	DF	GER	Mehmet Kaya
6	MF	GER	Eduard Mehmeti
7	FW	GER	Julian Kurowski
8	DF	GER	Keanu Kerbsties
9	FW	UKR	Yehor Koniuchenko
10	MF	GER	Robin Shivani (on loan from VfL Osnabrück)
11	FW	GER	Simon Zöls
12	GK	GER	Tim Fisch
13	FW	LUX	Eric Preljevic
14	FW	NED	Ezra Edward
16	MF	BUL	Nedzhib Hadzha
17	FW	GER	Samuel Owusu Addai

No.	Pos.	Nation	Player
18	DF	GER	Yunus Akdag
19	MF	LBN	Hassan Mohamad
20	MF	GER	Can Akbas
21	MF	GER	Fatih Öztürk
22	GK	GER	Mika Westerhus
23	FW	GER	Malte Zumdieck
24	DF	NED	Karlo Grgic
25	DF	GER	Emro Curic
26	DF	GER	Denis Milic
27	DF	GER	Justin Faltyn
29	DF	CMR	Dimitrie Deumi-Nappi
30	FW	GER	Noah Wallenßus
37	MF	GER	Farès Hadj
44	GK	GER	Luis Hillemeier
45	MF	GER	Arda Halicioglu

=== Out on loan ===
Note: Flags indicate national team as defined under FIFA eligibility rules; some limited exceptions apply. Players may hold more than one non-FIFA nationality.

No.	Pos.	Nation	Player

== Notable coaches ==
- Manfred Wölpper (2008)
- Maik Walpurgis (2008–2013)
