= 2016–17 SV Werder Bremen II season =

Werder Bremen II
2016–17 season
- Manager: Florian Kohfeldt
- Stadium: Weserstadion Platz 11
- 3. Liga: 17th
Home colours	Away colours	Third colours
- All statistics correct as of 19 April 2017.

The 2016–17 SV Werder Bremen II season is the 6th season for the football club in the 3. Liga. The season covers a period from 1 July 2016 to 30 June 2017.

== Players ==
=== Squad ===
As of 26 January 2017

Note: Flags indicate national team as defined under FIFA eligibility rules; some limited exceptions apply. Players may hold more than one non-FIFA nationality.

No.	Pos.	Nation	Player
2	DF	GER	Torben Rehfeldt
4	DF	NED	Jesper Verlaat
5	DF	GER	Dominic Volkmer
6	MF	GER	Björn Rother
8	MF	FRA	Mohamed Aidara (captain)
14	MF	GER	Ole Käuper
15	FW	TUR	Abdullah Doğan
16	DF	GER	Maurice Hehne
18	MF	GER	Leander Wasmus
19	DF	GER	Luca Zander
21	DF	GER	Philipp Eggersglüß
22	GK	GER	Tobias Duffner

No.	Pos.	Nation	Player
23	DF	ALB	Muhamet Cakolli
24	FW	GER	Johannes Eggestein
31	MF	GER	Marc Pfitzner
32	MF	POL	Rafael Kazior
33	MF	GER	Leon Jensen
34	MF	MLI	Sambou Yatabaré
36	MF	GER	Thore Jacobsen
38	MF	GER	Niklas Schmidt
41	GK	GER	Tom Pachulski
43	GK	GER	Eric Oelschlägel
46	FW	GER	Enis Bytyqi
47	FW	GAM	Ousman Manneh

== Competitions ==
Win Draw Loss

=== 3. Liga ===
==== League table ====
Pos	Team	Pld	W	D	L	GF	GA	GD	Pts	Promotion, qualification or relegation
15	Hansa Rostock	38	10	16	12	44	46	−2	46	
16	Fortuna Köln	38	12	10	16	37	59	−22	46	
17	Werder Bremen II (Note: Reserve teams are ineligible for promotion or DFB-Pokal qualification.)	38	12	9	17	32	48	−16	45	
18	SC Paderborn (Note: SC Paderborn were originally relegated from the 2016–17 3. Liga after finishing 18th. However, 1860 Munich, who were relegated from the 2016–17 2. Bundesliga, were unable to obtain a license for the 2017–18 3. Liga. Therefore, SC Paderborn, who submitted a 3. Liga license application, remained in the league for the 2017–18 season.)	38	12	8	18	38	57	−19	44	
19	Mainz 05 II (R)	38	11	7	20	41	58	−17	40	Relegation to Regionalliga

Source: DFB
Rules for classification: 1) Points; 2) Goal difference; 3) Goals scored
(R) Relegated

==== Results summary ====
Overall								Home						Away					
Pld	W	D	L	GF	GA	GD	Pts	W	D	L	GF	GA	GD	W	D	L	GF	GA	GD
38	9	14	15	39	39	0	41	7	6	7	25	18	+7	2	8	8	14	21	−7

Last updated: 20 May 2017.
Source: kicker

==== Results by round ====
Round	1	2	3	4	5	6	7	8	9	10	11	12	13	14	15	16	17	18	19	20	21	22	23	24	25	26	27	28	29	30	31	32	33	34	35	36	37	38
Ground	H	A	H	A	H	A	H	A	A	H	A	H	A	H	A	H	A	H	A	A	H	A	H	A	H	A	H	H	H	A	H	A	A	H	A	H	A	H
Result	L	L	L	W	W	L	W	L	L	L	L	W	D	W	D	W	L	D	L	W	D	L	W	W	D	W	L	L	L	D	D	L	L	L	D	D	W	W
Position	20	19	19	17	17	17	17	19	19	19	19	18	17	17	17	17	19	19	19	18	18	18	17	17	17	17	17	17	17	17	17	17	18	18	18	18	18	17

Updated to match(es) played on 20 May 2017. Source:
A = Away; H = Home; W = Win; D = Draw; L = Loss

==== Matches ====
31 July 2016 1	SV Werder Bremen II	0–3	Sportfreunde Lotte	Bremen
14:00	Jensen (red card) 34'; Manneh (yellow card) 40'; Kazior (yellow card) 54'; Rother (yellow card) 88'	Report	Rosinger 22'; Wendel (yellow card) 23'; Langlitz (yellow card) 34'; Rahn (yellow card) 40'; Pires-Rodrigues (yellow card) 65'; Nauber (yellow card) 70' (goal) 86'; Dej 71'	Stadium: Weserstadion; Attendance: 1,769; Referee: (Germany) Robert Schröder

5 August 2016 2	Fortuna Köln	2–0	SV Werder Bremen II	Cologne
19:00	Bender 2'; Cauly 80'; Rahn (yellow card) 88'	Report	Pfitzner (yellow card) 63'; Volkmer (yellow card) 71'	Stadium: Südstadion; Attendance: 2,127; Referee: (Germany) Christof Günsch

10 August 2016 3	SV Werder Bremen II	1–3	FSV Zwickau	Bremen
18:30	Manneh 13'; Kazior (yellow card) 39'; Jacobsen (yellow card) 69'; Schmidt (yellow card) 78'; Duffner (yellow card) 87'	Report	Paul 11'; Frick (yellow card) 29'; König (yellow card) 54' (goal) 78'; Lange (yellow card) 64'; Berger (yellow card) 70'; Wachsmuth 88' (pen.)	Stadium: Weserstadion Platz 11; Attendance: 1,262; Referee: (Germany) Benedikt Kempkes

13 August 2016 4	SC Paderborn	1–2	SV Werder Bremen II	Paderborn
14:00	Zolinski (yellow card) 18'; Krauße (yellow card) 21' van der Biezen 60'; Kruse (yellow card) 90+2'	Report	Schmidt (yellow card) 43'; Aidara (yellow card) 57'; Rehfeldt 90'; Kazior 90+3'	Stadium: Benteler-Arena; Attendance: 4,749; Referee: (Germany) Guido Winkmann

26 August 2016 5	SV Werder Bremen II	4–2	VfL Osnabrück	Bremen
19:00	Garcia 16'; Eggestein 44'; Kazior 46'; Lorenzen (yellow card) 85'; Manneh 86'	Report	Renneke 81'; Willers 90+2'	Stadium: Weserstadion Platz 11; Attendance: 3,300; Referee: (Germany) Daniel Schlager

10 September 2016 6	MSV Duisburg	1–0	SV Werder Bremen II	Duisburg
14:00	Erat 22'; Bomheuer (yellow card) 90'	Report	Aidara (yellow card) 13'; Fröde (yellow card) 84'	Stadium: Schauinsland-Reisen-Arena; Attendance: 12,452; Referee: (Germany) Nicolas Winter

17 September 2016 7	SV Werder Bremen II	2–1	Mainz 05 II	Bremen
14:00	Kazior 25'; Veljković (yellow card) 38'; Lorenzen 84'	Report	Moos (yellow card) 21'; Steinmann (yellow card) 31'; Halimi 38' (pen.); Häusl (yellow card) 42' (yellow-red card); Seydel (yellow card) 60'; Bohl (yellow card) 90+1'	Stadium: Weserstadion Platz 11; Attendance: 434; Referee: (Germany) Oliver Lossius

21 September 2016 8	1. FC Magdeburg	2–0	SV Werder Bremen II	Magdeburg
18:30	Sowislo 14'; Beck (yellow card) 52'; Brandt (yellow card) 76'; Chahed 90+2'	Report	Kazior (yellow card) 50'	Stadium: MDCC-Arena; Attendance: 12,238; Referee: (Germany) Justus Zorn

24 September 2016 9	Preußen Münster	4–0	SV Werder Bremen II	Münster
14:00	Grimaldi 12' 49'; Tekerci 52' 77'; Kittner (yellow card) 90'	Report	Jacobsen (yellow card) 62'; Verlaat (yellow card) 67'; Volkmer (yellow card) 79'	Stadium: Preußenstadion; Attendance: 5,579; Referee: (Germany) Michael Bacher

1 October 2016 10	SV Werder Bremen II	0–1	Wehen Wiesbaden	Bremen
14:00	Eggestein (yellow card) 33'; Verlaat (yellow card) 73'; Eggersglüß (yellow card) 77'	Report	Lorenz 9'; Blacha (yellow card) 36'	Stadium: Weserstadion Platz 11; Attendance: 432; Referee: (Germany) Johann Pfeifer

15 October 2016 11	Holstein Kiel	3–1	SV Werder Bremen II	Kiel
14:00	Schindler 6'; Drexler 52'; Lewerenz 85'	Report	Pfitzner (yellow card) 10'; Aidara 37' (yellow card) 72'; Bytyqi (yellow card) 64'; Verlaat (yellow card) 84'	Stadium: Holstein-Stadion; Attendance: 4,576; Referee: (Germany) Patrick Schult

23 October 2016 12	SV Werder Bremen II	1–0	RW Erfurt	Bremen
14:00	Eggestein 59'; Lorenzen (yellow card) 90+4'	Report	Bieber (yellow card) 43'	Stadium: Weserstadion; Attendance: 780; Referee: (Germany) Steffen Brütting

29 October 2016 13	Chemnitzer FC	1–1	SV Werder Bremen II	Chemnitz
14:00	Frahn 9'; Mast (yellow card) 56'; Jopek (yellow card) 90'	Report	Zander (yellow card) 21'; Rehfeldt (yellow card) 65'; Kazior (yellow card) 70'; Lorenzen 90+2'	Stadium: community4you ARENA; Attendance: 6,022; Referee: (Germany) Florian Kornblum

5 November 2016 14	SV Werder Bremen II	3–1	SSV Jahn Regensburg	Bremen
14:00	Lorenzen (yellow card) 46'; Diagne (yellow card) 59'; Yatabaré 68' 90+2'; Volkmer (yellow card) 83'; Bytyqi 88'; Kazior (yellow card) 90+3'	Report	Nandzik (yellow card) 38'; Geipl (yellow card) 48' (goal) 85' (pen.); George (yellow card) 73'	Stadium: Weserstadion Platz 11; Attendance: 541; Referee: (Germany) Nicolas Winter

19 November 2016 15	Hansa Rostock	1–1	SV Werder Bremen II	Rostock
14:00	Grupe 26'; Andrist (yellow card) 63'; Wannenwetsch (yellow card) 72'; Kofler (red card) 79'	Report	Zander (yellow card) 32'; Rother (yellow card) 50'; Eggestein 80' (pen.)	Stadium: Ostseestadion; Attendance: 9,900; Referee: (Germany) Bastian Börner

26 November 2016 16	SV Werder Bremen II	1–0	SG Sonnenhof Großaspach	Bremen
14:00	Eggestein (yellow card) 7' (goal) 86'; Eggestein (yellow card) 32'; Yatabaré (yellow card) 89'	Report	Hägele (yellow card) 69'; Osei Kwadwo (yellow card) 90'	Stadium: Weserstadion Platz 11; Attendance: 273; Referee: (Germany) Michael Bacher

3 December 2016 17	Hallescher FC	2–0	SV Werder Bremen II	Halle (Saale)
14:00	Gjasula 61' (yellow card) 71'; Pfeffer 79'	Report	Pfitzner (yellow card) 41'; Volkmer (yellow card) 86'	Stadium: Erdgas Sportpark; Attendance: 5,344; Referee: (Germany) Oliver Lossius

10 December 2016 18	SV Werder Bremen II	0–0	FSV Frankfurt	Bremen
14:00	Rother (yellow card) 31'	Report	Streker (yellow card) 27'	Stadium: Weserstadion Platz 11; Attendance: 515; Referee: (Germany) Tim-Julian Skorczyk

17 December 2016 19	VfR Aalen	3–0	SV Werder Bremen II	Aalen
14:00	Morys 8'; Müller 57' (pen.); Jacobsen 45' (o.g.)	Report		Stadium: SCHOLZ ARENA; Attendance: 3,024; Referee: (Germany) Sven Waschitzki

28 January 2017 20	Sportfreunde Lotte	1–2	SV Werder Bremen II	Lotte
14:00	Nauber (yellow card) 10'; Wendel 47'; Heyer (yellow card) 55'; Gorschlüter (yellow card) 71'	Report	Kazior (yellow card) 35'; Rother 45+1'; Verlaat 45+3' (yellow card) 56'; Schmidt (yellow card) 51'	Stadium: Frimo Stadion; Attendance: 1,569; Referee: (Germany) Steffen Mix

5 February 2017 21	SV Werder Bremen II	1–1	Fortuna Köln	Bremen
14:00	Schmidt 41'; Eilers (yellow card) 64'; Pfitzner (red card) 80'	Report	Kwame (yellow card) 15'; Andersen (yellow card) 16' (goal) 84'; Bender (yellow card) 70'	Stadium: Weserstadion Platz 11; Attendance: 603; Referee: (Germany) Asmir Osmanagic

11 February 2017 22	FSV Zwickau	2–1	SV Werder Bremen II	Zwickau
14:00	Göbel (yellow card) 24'; König 35'; Miatke (yellow card) 85'; Oelschlägel 90+3' (o.g.)	Report	Schmidt (yellow card) 16'; Zander (yellow card) 57'; Rother (yellow card) 63'; Jensen 71'	Stadium: Stadion Zwickau; Attendance: 3,478; Referee: (Germany) Benjamin Bläser

18 February 2017 23	SV Werder Bremen II	1–0	SC Paderborn	Bremen
14:00	Eggestein 39'; Käuper (yellow card) 83'	Report	Kruska (yellow card) 74'	Stadium: Weserstadion Platz 11; Attendance: 742; Referee: (Germany) Henry Müller

24 February 2017 24	VfL Osnabrück	0–1	SV Werder Bremen II	Osnabrück
19:00	Sangaré (yellow card) 35'; Engel (yellow card) 62'; Dercho (yellow card) 79'; Wriedt (yellow card) 88'	Report	Manneh 8'; Lorenzen (yellow card) 56'; Eilers (yellow card) 66'	Stadium: osnatel ARENA; Attendance: 7,883; Referee: (Germany) Nicolas Winter

5 March 2017 25	SV Werder Bremen II	0–0	MSV Duisburg	Bremen
14:00		Report	Flekken (yellow card) 75'	Stadium: Weserstadion Platz 11; Attendance: 2,510; Referee: (Germany) Benedikt Kempkes

11 March 2017 26	Mainz 05 II	0–1	SV Werder Bremen II	Mainz
14:00	Serder (yellow card) 86'; Hack (yellow card) 87' (red card) 90+4'; Rossmann (yellow card) 90+3'	Report	Yatabaré (yellow card) 19' (yellow-red card); Kazior 43'; Eilers (yellow card) 82'	Stadium: Bruchwegstadion; Attendance: 698; Referee: (Germany) Oliver Lossius

14 March 2017 27	SV Werder Bremen II	0–1	1. FC Magdeburg	Bremen
18:00	Lorenzen (yellow card) 9'; Duffner (yellow card) 90+2'	Report	Puttkammer (yellow card) 62'; Weil 90+3' (pen.)	Stadium: Weserstadion Platz 11; Attendance: 2,836; Referee: (Germany) Riem Hussein

17 March 2017 28	SV Werder Bremen II	0–1	Preußen Münster	Bremen
19:00	Eilers (yellow card) 90+2'	Report	Grimaldi 25'; Rizzi (yellow card) 39'; Braun (yellow card) 52'; Wiebe (yellow card) 61'	Stadium: Weserstadion Platz 11; Attendance: 1,670; Referee: (Germany) Asmir Osmanagic

1 April 2017 29	SV Werder Bremen II	0–2	Holstein Kiel	Bremen
14:00	Schmidt (yellow card) 75'	Report	Schindler 42' 72'; Azemi (yellow card) 49'; Schmidt (yellow card) 67'	Stadium: Weserstadion Platz 11; Attendance: 1,779; Referee: (Germany) Benjamin Bläser

4 April 2017 30	RW Erfurt	1–1	SV Werder Bremen II	Erfurt
19:00	Tyrała (yellow card) 21'; Aydın 42' (yellow card) 90+5'; Vocaj (yellow card) 72'; Klewin (yellow card) 81'; Nikolaou (yellow card) 90+1'; Kammlott (yellow card) 90+3'	Report	Jensen 20'; Volkmer (yellow card) 46'; Kazior (yellow card) 82'; Verlaat (yellow card) 86'	Stadium: Steigerwaldstadion; Attendance: 4,086; Referee: (Germany) Tobias Fritsch

8 April 2017 31	SV Werder Bremen II	0–0	Chemnitzer FC	Bremen
14:00	Jensen (yellow card) 33'; Yatabaré (red card) 61'	Report	Danneberg (yellow card) 52'	Stadium: Weserstadion Platz 11; Attendance: 938; Referee: (Germany) Bastian Börner

15 April 2017 32	SSV Jahn Regensburg	3–1	SV Werder Bremen II	Regensburg
14:00	Pusch 28' 61'; Thommy 55'; Nachreiner (yellow card) 75'; George (yellow card) 90+2'	Report	Rother (yellow card) 15'; Zetterer (yellow card) 51'; Manneh 63'; Pfitzner (yellow card) 81'; Käuper (yellow card) 87'; Jensen (yellow card) 90+1'	Stadium: Continental Arena; Attendance: 6,324; Referee: (Germany) Tim-Julian Skorczyk

19 April 2017 33	Wehen Wiesbaden	2–0	SV Werder Bremen II	Wiesbaden
19:00	Mrowca (yellow card) 34'; Dams 43'; Schäffler 67'	Report	Aidara (yellow card) 45'; Zander (yellow card) 60'	Stadium: BRITA-Arena; Attendance: 1,745; Referee: (Germany) Felix-Benjamin Schwermer

22 April 2017 34	SV Werder Bremen II	0–2	Hansa Rostock	Bremen
14:00	Kazior (yellow card) 77' (yellow-red card)	Report	Andrist 49'; Jänicke (yellow card) 90'; Quiring 90+3'	Stadium: Weserstadion; Attendance: 4,485; Referee: (Germany) Steffen Mix

29 April 2017 35	SG Sonnenhof Großaspach	0–0	SV Werder Bremen II	Aspach
14:00	Lorch (yellow card) 27'; Gehring (yellow card) 76'; Maria (yellow card) 79'	Report	Käuper (yellow card) 24'; Yatabaré (yellow card) 60'; Jensen (yellow card) 74'	Stadium: Mechatronik Arena; Attendance: 750; Referee: (Germany) Oliver Lossius

5 May 2017 36	SV Werder Bremen II	1–1	Hallescher FC	Bremen
19:00	Eilers 15'; Rother (yellow card) 64'; Schmidt (yellow card) 76'	Report	Röser 42'; Diring (yellow card) 67'	Stadium: Weserstadion Platz 11; Attendance: 618; Referee: (Germany) Asmir Osmanagic

13 May 2017 37	FSV Frankfurt	0–4	SV Werder Bremen II	Frankfurt
13:30		Report	Yatabaré 57'; Eilers 65' 67'; Schmidt 85'	Stadium: Frankfurter Volksbank Stadion; Attendance: 2,553; Referee: (Germany) Patrick Schult

20 May 2017 38	SV Werder Bremen II	1–0	VfR Aalen	Bremen
13:30	Käuper (yellow card) 64'; Volkmer 84'	Summary	Paetow (yellow card) 24'; Vasiliadis (yellow card) 61'	Stadium: Weserstadion Platz 11; Attendance: 1,297; Referee: (Germany) Patrick Alt
