= 2017–18 SV Werder Bremen season =

Werder Bremen
2017–18 season
- President: Klaus-Dieter Fischer
- Manager: Alexander Nouri (until 30 October); Florian Kohfeldt (interim, 30 October – 10 November; head coach, from 10 November)
- Stadium: Weser-Stadion
- Bundesliga: 11th
- DFB-Pokal: Quarter-finals
- Top goalscorer: League: Max Kruse (6); All: Max Kruse (8)
- Highest home attendance: 42,100
- Lowest home attendance: 31,210
- Average home league attendance: 40,870
- Biggest win: Bremen 4–0 Hannover
- Biggest defeat: Bremen 0–3 Augsburg
| Home colours | Away colours | Third colours |

The 2017–18 SV Werder Bremen season was the 119th season in the football club's history and 37th consecutive and 54th overall season in the top flight of German football, the Bundesliga, having been promoted from the 2. Bundesliga Nord in 1981. In addition to the domestic league, Werder Bremen were participating in this season's edition of the domestic cup competition, the DFB-Pokal. This was the 71st season for Bremen in the Weser-Stadion, located in Bremen, Free Hanseatic City of Bremen, Germany. The season covered a period from 1 July 2017 to 30 June 2018.

== Players ==
=== Squad information ===
As of 20 February 2018

Note: Flags indicate national team as defined under FIFA eligibility rules; some limited exceptions apply. Players may hold more than one non-FIFA nationality.

| No. | Pos. | Nation | Player |
|---|---|---|---|
| 1 | GK | CZE | Jiří Pavlenka |
| 3 | DF | ITA | Luca Caldirola |
| 4 | DF | GER | Robert Bauer |
| 5 | DF | SWE | Ludwig Augustinsson |
| 6 | MF | DEN | Thomas Delaney |
| 7 | MF | AUT | Florian Kainz |
| 8 | MF | GER | Jérôme Gondorf |
| 9 | FW | USA | Aron Jóhannsson |
| 10 | FW | GER | Max Kruse (vice-captain) |
| 11 | MF | KOS | Milot Rashica |
| 13 | DF | SRB | Miloš Veljković |
| 14 | MF | GER | Ole Käuper |
| 15 | DF | GER | Sebastian Langkamp |
| 16 | MF | AUT | Zlatko Junuzović (captain) |
| 17 | FW | GER | Justin Eilers |

| No. | Pos. | Nation | Player |
|---|---|---|---|
| 18 | DF | FIN | Niklas Moisander |
| 19 | FW | CHN | Yuning Zhang (on loan from West Bromwich Albion) |
| 22 | MF | GER | Fin Bartels |
| 23 | DF | CZE | Theodor Gebre Selassie |
| 24 | FW | GER | Johannes Eggestein |
| 28 | DF | NED | Jesper Verlaat |
| 29 | FW | ALG | Ishak Belfodil (on loan from Standard Liège) |
| 30 | GK | GER | Michael Zetterer |
| 32 | DF | AUT | Marco Friedl (on loan from Bayern Munich) |
| 33 | GK | CZE | Jaroslav Drobný |
| 35 | MF | GER | Maximilian Eggestein |
| 38 | MF | GER | Niklas Schmidt |
| 40 | GK | GER | Luca Plogmann |
| 44 | MF | GER | Philipp Bargfrede |
| 47 | FW | GAM | Ousman Manneh |

== Competitions ==
Win Draw Loss

=== Overview ===
| Competition | First match | Last match | Starting round | Final position | Record | | | | | | | |
| Competition | First match | Last match | Starting round | Final position | Pld | W | D | L | GF | GA | GD | Win % |
|---|---|---|---|---|---|---|---|---|---|---|---|---|
| Bundesliga | 19 August 2017 | 12 May 2018 | Matchday 1 | | 34 | 10 | 12 | 12 | 37 | 40 | −3 | 29.41 |
| DFB-Pokal | 12 August 2017 | 6 February 2018 | First round | Quarter-finals | 4 | 3 | 0 | 1 | 9 | 6 | +3 | 75.00 |
| Total | | | | | 38 | 13 | 12 | 13 | 46 | 46 | +0 | 34.21 |

Last updated: 21 May 2018
Source: Competitions

=== Bundesliga ===
==== League table ====
| Pos | Team | Pld | W | D | L | GF | GA | GD | Pts |
|---|---|---|---|---|---|---|---|---|---|
| 9 | Borussia Mönchengladbach | 34 | 13 | 8 | 13 | 47 | 52 | −5 | 47 |
| 10 | Hertha BSC | 34 | 10 | 13 | 11 | 43 | 46 | −3 | 43 |
| 11 | Werder Bremen | 34 | 10 | 12 | 12 | 37 | 40 | −3 | 42 |
| 12 | FC Augsburg | 34 | 10 | 11 | 13 | 43 | 46 | −3 | 41 |
| 13 | Hannover 96 | 34 | 10 | 9 | 15 | 44 | 54 | −10 | 39 |

Source: DFB
Rules for classification: 1) Points; 2) Goal difference; 3) Goals scored; 4) Head-to-head results; 5) Head-to-head away goals scored; 6) Away goals scored; 7) Play-off.

==== Results summary ====
| Overall | | | | | | | | Home | | | | | | Away | | | | | |
| Pld | W | D | L | GF | GA | GD | Pts | W | D | L | GF | GA | GD | W | D | L | GF | GA | GD |
|---|---|---|---|---|---|---|---|---|---|---|---|---|---|---|---|---|---|---|---|
| 34 | 10 | 12 | 12 | 37 | 40 | −3 | 42 | 6 | 7 | 4 | 20 | 17 | +3 | 4 | 5 | 8 | 17 | 23 | −6 |

Last updated: 21 May 2018.
Source: Bundesliga

==== Results by round ====
| Round | 1 | 2 | 3 | 4 | 5 | 6 | 7 | 8 | 9 | 10 | 11 | 12 | 13 | 14 | 15 | 16 | 17 | 18 | 19 | 20 | 21 | 22 | 23 | 24 | 25 | 26 | 27 | 28 | 29 | 30 | 31 | 32 | 33 | 34 |
|---|---|---|---|---|---|---|---|---|---|---|---|---|---|---|---|---|---|---|---|---|---|---|---|---|---|---|---|---|---|---|---|---|---|---|
| Ground | A | H | A | H | A | H | A | H | A | H | A | H | A | H | A | A | H | H | A | H | A | H | A | H | A | H | A | H | A | H | A | H | H | A |
| Result | L | L | D | L | D | D | D | L | D | L | L | W | L | W | W | L | D | D | L | D | W | W | L | W | D | W | W | W | L | D | L | D | D | W |
| Position | 11 | 18 | 16 | 17 | 17 | 17 | 17 | 17 | 17 | 17 | 17 | 16 | 17 | 17 | 17 | 17 | 16 | 16 | 16 | 16 | 15 | 15 | 15 | 14 | 14 | 13 | 12 | 12 | 12 | 12 | 12 | 12 | 12 | 11 |

Updated to match(es) played on 21 May 2018. Source: Bundesliga
A = Away; H = Home; W = Win; D = Draw; L = Loss

==== Matches ====
| 19 August 2017 1 | 1899 Hoffenheim | 1–0 | Werder Bremen | Sinsheim |
| 15:30 CEST (UTC+2) | Kramarić 84' | Report | | Stadium: Wirsol Rhein-Neckar-Arena; Attendance: 30,150; Referee: Guido Winkmann |

| 26 August 2017 2 | Werder Bremen | 0–2 | Bayern Munich | Bremen |
| 15:30 CEST (UTC+2) | | Report | Lewandowski 72', 75' | Stadium: Weser-Stadion; Attendance: 42,100; Referee: Bastian Dankert |

| 10 September 2017 3 | Hertha BSC | 1–1 | Werder Bremen | Berlin |
| 15:30 CEST (UTC+2) | Leckie 38' | Report | Delaney 59' | Stadium: Olympiastadion Berlin; Attendance: 49,118; Referee: Bibiana Steinhaus |

| 16 September 2017 4 | Werder Bremen | 1–2 | Schalke 04 | Bremen |
| 15:30 CEST (UTC+2) | Sané 20' | Report | Veljković 22' (o.g.); Goretzka 83' | Stadium: Weser-Stadion; Attendance: 42,100; Referee: Benjamin Brand |

| 19 September 2017 5 | VfL Wolfsburg | 1–1 | Werder Bremen | Wolfsburg |
| 20:30 CEST (UTC+2) | Origi 28' | Report | Bartels 56' | Stadium: Volkswagen Arena; Attendance: 26,174; Referee: Felix Brych |

| 23 September 2017 6 | Werder Bremen | 0–0 | SC Freiburg | Bremen |
| 15:30 CEST (UTC+2) | | Report | | Stadium: Weser-Stadion; Attendance: 41,000; Referee: Robert Hartmann |

| 30 September 2017 7 | Hamburger SV | 0–0 | Werder Bremen | Hamburg |
| 18:30 CEST (UTC+2) | | Report | | Stadium: Volksparkstadion; Attendance: 54,613; Referee: Deniz Aytekin |

| 15 October 2017 8 | Werder Bremen | 0–2 | Borussia Mönchengladbach | Bremen |
| 18:00 CEST (UTC+2) | | Report | Stindl 27'; Vestergaard 34' | Stadium: Weser-Stadion; Attendance: 42,100; Referee: Markus Schmidt |

| 22 October 2017 9 | 1. FC Köln | 0–0 | Werder Bremen | Cologne |
| 13:30 CEST (UTC+2) | | Report | | Stadium: RheinEnergieStadion; Attendance: 50,000; Referee: Robert Kampka |

| 29 October 2017 10 | Werder Bremen | 0–3 | FC Augsburg | Bremen |
| 15:30 CET (UTC+1) | | Report | Gregoritsch 40', 61'; Finnbogason 45+2' (pen.) | Stadium: Weser-Stadion; Attendance: 40,500; Referee: Sören Storks |

| 3 November 2017 11 | Eintracht Frankfurt | 2–1 | Werder Bremen | Frankfurt |
| 20:30 CET (UTC+1) | Rebić 17'; Haller 89' | Report | Moisander 24' | Stadium: Commerzbank-Arena; Attendance: 51,500; Referee: Benjamin Brand |

| 19 November 2017 12 | Werder Bremen | 4–0 | Hannover 96 | Bremen |
| 18:00 CET (UTC+1) | Bartels 39'; Kruse 55', 59', 78' | Report | | Stadium: Weser-Stadion; Attendance: 41,500; Referee: Benjamin Cortus |

| 25 November 2017 13 | RB Leipzig | 2–0 | Werder Bremen | Leipzig |
| 15:30 CET (UTC+1) | Keïta 34'; Bernardo 87' | Report | | Stadium: Red Bull Arena; Attendance: 40,172; Referee: Sascha Stegemann |

| 2 December 2017 14 | Werder Bremen | 1–0 | VfB Stuttgart | Bremen |
| 15:30 CET (UTC+1) | Kruse 45' | Report | | Stadium: Weser-Stadion; Attendance: 41,500; Referee: Bastian Dankert |

| 9 December 2017 15 | Borussia Dortmund | 1–2 | Werder Bremen | Dortmund |
| 15:30 CET (UTC+1) | Aubameyang 57' | Report | M. Eggestein 26'; Gebre Selassie 65' | Stadium: Signal Iduna Park; Attendance: 81,160; Referee: Manuel Gräfe |

| 13 December 2017 16 | Bayer Leverkusen | 1–0 | Werder Bremen | Leverkusen |
| 20:30 CET (UTC+1) | Alario 11' | Report | | Stadium: BayArena; Attendance: 26,620; Referee: Tobias Stieler |

| 16 December 2017 17 | Werder Bremen | 2–2 | Mainz 05 | Bremen |
| 15:30 CET (UTC+1) | Bargfrede 2'; Belfodil 17' | Report | Quaison 70'; Frei 90+3' | Stadium: Weser-Stadion; Attendance: 39,000; Referee: Benjamin Cortus |

| 13 January 2018 18 | Werder Bremen | 1–1 | 1899 Hoffenheim | Bremen |
| 15:30 CET (UTC+1) | Gebre Selassie 63' | Report | Hübner 39' | Stadium: Weser-Stadion; Attendance: 37,500; Referee: Robert Hartmann |

| 21 January 2018 19 | Bayern Munich | 4–2 | Werder Bremen | Munich |
| 15:30 CET (UTC+1) | Müller 41', 84'; Lewandowski 63', 76' | Report | Gondorf 25'; Süle 74' (o.g.) | Stadium: Allianz Arena; Attendance: 75,000; Referee: Robert Kampka |

| 27 January 2018 20 | Werder Bremen | 0–0 | Hertha BSC | Bremen |
| 18:30 CET (UTC+1) | | Report | | Stadium: Weser-Stadion; Attendance: 40,030; Referee: Bastian Dankert |

| 3 February 2018 21 | Schalke 04 | 1–2 | Werder Bremen | Gelsenkirchen |
| 15:30 CET (UTC+1) | Konoplyanka 24' | Report | Kruse 79'; Junuzović 90+3' | Stadium: Veltins-Arena; Attendance: 62,271; Referee: Guido Winkmann |

| 11 February 2018 22 | Werder Bremen | 3–1 | VfL Wolfsburg | Bremen |
| 18:00 CET (UTC+1) | Augustinsson 4'; Kainz 40', 72' | Report | Verhaegh 49' | Stadium: Weser-Stadion; Attendance: 38,062; Referee: Deniz Aytekin |

| 17 February 2018 23 | SC Freiburg | 1–0 | Werder Bremen | Freiburg |
| 15:30 CET (UTC+1) | Petersen 24' (pen.) | Report | | Stadium: Schwarzwald-Stadion; Attendance: 24,000; Referee: Robert Hartmann |

| 24 February 2018 24 | Werder Bremen | 1–0 | Hamburger SV | Bremen |
| 18:30 CET (UTC+1) | Van Drongelen 86' (o.g.) | Report | | Stadium: Weser-Stadion; Attendance: 42,100; Referee: Felix Zwayer |

| 2 March 2018 25 | Borussia Mönchengladbach | 2–2 | Werder Bremen | Mönchengladbach |
| 20:30 CET (UTC+1) | Zakaria 5'; Moisander 33' (o.g.) | Report | Delaney 59'; Jóhannsson 78' | Stadium: Borussia-Park; Attendance: 52,211; Referee: Benjamin Cortus |

| 12 March 2018 26 | Werder Bremen | 3–1 | 1. FC Köln | Bremen |
| 20:30 CET (UTC+1) | Veljković 33'; Rashica 58'; M. Eggestein 90' | Report | Osako 53' | Stadium: Weser-Stadion; Attendance: 41,100; Referee: Benjamin Brand |

| 17 March 2018 27 | FC Augsburg | 1–3 | Werder Bremen | Augsburg |
| 15:30 CET (UTC+1) | Khedira 63' | Report | Belfodil 5', 40'; Kruse 82' | Stadium: WWK Arena; Attendance: 30,080; Referee: Sascha Stegemann |

| 1 April 2018 28 | Werder Bremen | 2–1 | Eintracht Frankfurt | Bremen |
| 15:30 CEST (UTC+2) | Junuzović 28'; Abraham 79' (o.g.) | Report | Jović 53' | Stadium: Weser-Stadion; Attendance: 42,100; Referee: Felix Zwayer |

| 6 April 2018 29 | Hannover 96 | 2–1 | Werder Bremen | Hanover |
| 20:30 CEST (UTC+2) | Harnik 17'; Klaus 42' | Report | Belfodil 74' | Stadium: HDI-Arena; Attendance: 49,000; Referee: Tobias Welz |

| 15 April 2018 30 | Werder Bremen | 1–1 | RB Leipzig | Bremen |
| 18:00 CEST (UTC+2) | Moisander 28' | Report | Lookman 50' | Stadium: Weser-Stadion; Attendance: 42,100; Referee: Christian Dingert |

| 21 April 2018 31 | VfB Stuttgart | 2–0 | Werder Bremen | Stuttgart |
| 15:30 CEST (UTC+2) | Gentner 13'; Özcan 90+1' | Report | | Stadium: Mercedes-Benz Arena; Attendance: 58,932; Referee: Sören Storks |

| 29 April 2018 32 | Werder Bremen | 1–1 | Borussia Dortmund | Bremen |
| 18:00 CEST (UTC+2) | Delaney 45' | Report | Reus 19' | Stadium: Weser-Stadion; Attendance: 41,000; Referee: Felix Brych |

| 5 May 2018 33 | Werder Bremen | 0–0 | Bayer Leverkusen | Bremen |
| 15:30 CEST (UTC+2) | | Report | | Stadium: Weser-Stadion; Attendance: 41,000; Referee: Robert Hartmann |

| 12 May 2018 34 | Mainz 05 | 1–2 | Werder Bremen | Mainz |
| 15:30 CEST (UTC+2) | Gbamin 12' | Report | Kainz 23'; Gebre Selassie 79' | Stadium: Opel Arena; Attendance: 34,000; Referee: Martin Petersen |

=== DFB-Pokal ===
| 12 August 2017 First round | Würzburger Kickers | 0–3 | Werder Bremen | Offenbach |
| 20:45 CEST (UTC+2) | | Report | Veljković 50'; Kruse 74'; M. Eggestein 77' | Stadium: Sparda-Bank-Hessen-Stadion; Attendance: 8,090; Referee: Sascha Stegemann |

| 25 October 2017 Second round | Werder Bremen | 1–0 | 1899 Hoffenheim | Bremen |
| 20:45 CEST (UTC+2) | Belfodil 30' | Report | | Stadium: Weser-Stadion; Attendance: 31,210; Referee: Tobias Stieler |

| 20 December 2017 Round of 16 | Werder Bremen | 3–2 | SC Freiburg | Bremen |
| 18:30 CET (UTC+1) | Belfodil 3'; Kainz 20'; Bargfrede 69' | Report | Petersen 28' (pen.); Ravet 86' | Stadium: Weser-Stadion; Attendance: 33,519; Referee: Guido Winkmann |

| 6 February 2018 Quarter-finals | Bayer Leverkusen | 4–2 (a.e.t.) | Werder Bremen | Leverkusen |
| 20:45 CET (UTC+1) | Brandt 31', 55'; Bellarabi 111'; Havertz 118' | Report | Kruse 4' (pen.); Jóhannsson 7' | Stadium: BayArena; Attendance: 25,653; Referee: Marco Fritz |

== Statistics ==
=== Appearances and goals ===
| No. | Pos | Nat | Player | Total | | Bundesliga | | DFB-Pokal | |
| No. | Pos | Nat | Player | Apps | Goals | Apps | Goals | Apps | Goals |
Goalkeepers
| 1 | GK | (Czech Republic) CZE | Jiří Pavlenka | 38 | 0 | 34 | 0 | 4 | 0 |
| 30 | GK | (Germany) GER | Michael Zetterer | 0 | 0 | 0 | 0 | 0 | 0 |
| 33 | GK | (Czech Republic) CZE | Jaroslav Drobný | 0 | 0 | 0 | 0 | 0 | 0 |
| 40 | GK | (Germany) GER | Luca Plogmann | 0 | 0 | 0 | 0 | 0 | 0 |
Defenders
| 3 | DF | (Italy) ITA | Luca Caldirola | 1 | 0 | 1 | 0 | 0 | 0 |
| 4 | DF | (Germany) GER | Robert Bauer | 19 | 0 | 12+4 | 0 | 2+1 | 0 |
| 5 | DF | (Sweden) SWE | Ludwig Augustinsson | 33 | 1 | 29 | 1 | 4 | 0 |
| 13 | DF | (Serbia) SRB | Miloš Veljković | 34 | 2 | 30 | 1 | 4 | 1 |
| 15 | DF | (Germany) GER | Sebastian Langkamp | 10 | 0 | 5+4 | 0 | 0+1 | 0 |
| 18 | DF | (Finland) FIN | Niklas Moisander | 28 | 2 | 25 | 2 | 3 | 0 |
| 23 | DF | (Czech Republic) CZE | Theodor Gebre Selassie | 36 | 3 | 31+1 | 3 | 4 | 0 |
| 28 | DF | (Netherlands) NED | Jesper Verlaat | 0 | 0 | 0 | 0 | 0 | 0 |
| 32 | DF | (Austria) AUT | Marco Friedl | 9 | 0 | 6+3 | 0 | 0 | 0 |
Midfielders
| 6 | MF | (Denmark) DEN | Thomas Delaney | 36 | 3 | 31+1 | 3 | 4 | 0 |
| 7 | MF | (Austria) AUT | Florian Kainz | 34 | 4 | 19+11 | 3 | 3+1 | 1 |
| 8 | MF | (Germany) GER | Jérôme Gondorf | 23 | 1 | 7+14 | 1 | 2 | 0 |
| 11 | MF | (Kosovo) KOS | Milot Rashica | 10 | 1 | 5+4 | 1 | 0+1 | 0 |
| 14 | MF | (Germany) GER | Ole Käuper | 1 | 0 | 1 | 0 | 0 | 0 |
| 16 | MF | (Austria) AUT | Zlatko Junuzović | 26 | 2 | 17+7 | 2 | 2 | 0 |
| 22 | MF | (Germany) GER | Fin Bartels | 14 | 2 | 14 | 2 | 0 | 0 |
| 35 | MF | (Germany) GER | Maximilian Eggestein | 37 | 3 | 31+2 | 2 | 3+1 | 1 |
| 38 | MF | (Germany) GER | Niklas Schmidt | 0 | 0 | 0 | 0 | 0 | 0 |
| 44 | MF | (Germany) GER | Philipp Bargfrede | 30 | 2 | 23+4 | 1 | 2+1 | 1 |
Forwards
| 9 | FW | (United States) USA | Aron Jóhannsson | 14 | 2 | 2+10 | 1 | 1+1 | 1 |
| 10 | FW | (Germany) GER | Max Kruse | 33 | 8 | 28+1 | 6 | 2+2 | 2 |
| 17 | FW | (Germany) GER | Justin Eilers | 0 | 0 | 0 | 0 | 0 | 0 |
| 19 | FW | (China) CHN | Zhang Yuning | 0 | 0 | 0 | 0 | 0 | 0 |
| 24 | FW | (Germany) GER | Johannes Eggestein | 8 | 0 | 0+7 | 0 | 0+1 | 0 |
| 29 | FW | (Algeria) ALG | Ishak Belfodil | 29 | 6 | 13+13 | 4 | 2+1 | 2 |
| 47 | FW | (The Gambia) GAM | Ousman Manneh | 0 | 0 | 0 | 0 | 0 | 0 |
Players transferred out during the season
| 20 | DF | (Switzerland) SUI | Ulisses Garcia | 3 | 0 | 1 | 0 | 1+1 | 0 |
| 26 | DF | (Senegal) SEN | Lamine Sané | 12 | 1 | 9+2 | 1 | 1 | 0 |
| 15 | FW | (Bosnia and Herzegovina) BIH | Izet Hajrović | 9 | 0 | 0+9 | 0 | 0 | 0 |

Last updated: 12 May 2018
Source: Competitions
