= 2018–19 SV Werder Bremen season =

Werder Bremen
2018–19 season
- President: Klaus-Dieter Fischer
- Manager: Florian Kohfeldt
- Stadium: Weser-Stadion
- Bundesliga: 8th
- DFB-Pokal: Semi-finals
- Top goalscorer: League: Max Kruse (11 goals); All: Max Kruse (12 goals)
- Highest home attendance: 42,100
- Lowest home attendance: 39,100
- Average home league attendance: 41,403
- Biggest win: Worms 1–6 Bremen
- Biggest defeat: [Bremen 2–6 Leverkusen
Home colours	Away colours	Third colours
- All statistics correct as of 25 May 2019.

The 2018–19 SV Werder Bremen season is the 120th season in the football club's history and 38th consecutive and 55th overall season in the top flight of German football, the Bundesliga, having been promoted from the 2. Bundesliga Nord in 1981. In addition to the domestic league, Werder Bremen also are participating in this season's edition of the domestic cup, the DFB-Pokal. This is the 72nd season for Bremen in the Weser-Stadion, located in Bremen, Free Hanseatic City of Bremen, Germany. The season covers a period from 1 July 2018 to 30 June 2019.

== Players ==
=== Squad information ===
As of 6 February 2019

Note: Flags indicate national team as defined under FIFA eligibility rules; some limited exceptions apply. Players may hold more than one non-FIFA nationality.

No.	Pos.	Nation	Player
1	GK	CZE	Jiří Pavlenka
2	DF	SWE	Felix Beijmo
4	FW	PER	Claudio Pizarro
5	DF	SWE	Ludwig Augustinsson
6	MF	GER	Kevin Möhwald
8	FW	JPN	Yuya Osako
9	FW	AUT	Martin Harnik
10	FW	GER	Max Kruse (captain)
11	MF	KOS	Milot Rashica
13	DF	SRB	Miloš Veljković
15	DF	GER	Sebastian Langkamp
17	MF	TUR	Nuri Şahin
18	DF	FIN	Niklas Moisander (vice-captain)
19	FW	USA	Josh Sargent

No.	Pos.	Nation	Player
20	FW	USA	Aron Jóhannsson
22	MF	GER	Fin Bartels
23	DF	CZE	Theodor Gebre Selassie
24	FW	GER	Johannes Eggestein
27	GK	GRE	Stefanos Kapino
30	MF	NED	Davy Klaassen
32	DF	AUT	Marco Friedl (on loan from Bayern Munich)
34	MF	GER	Jean-Manuel Mbom
35	MF	GER	Maximilian Eggestein
36	DF	GER	Thore Jacobsen
39	DF	GER	Jan-Niklas Beste
40	GK	GER	Luca Plogmann
44	MF	GER	Philipp Bargfrede

=== Players under contract ===
Note: Flags indicate national team as defined under FIFA eligibility rules; some limited exceptions apply. Players may hold more than one non-FIFA nationality.

No.	Pos.	Nation	Player
—	MF	GRE	Thanos Petsos

=== Players out on loan ===
Note: Flags indicate national team as defined under FIFA eligibility rules; some limited exceptions apply. Players may hold more than one non-FIFA nationality.

No.	Pos.	Nation	Player
—	GK	GER	Michael Zetterer (to Klagenfurt until 30 June 2019)
—	DF	GER	Robert Bauer (to 1. FC Nürnberg until 30 June 2019)

No.	Pos.	Nation	Player
—	MF	GER	Ole Käuper (to Erzgebirge Aue until 30 June 2019)
—	MF	AUT	Romano Schmid (to Wolfsberger AC until 30 June 2019)

=== Transfers In ===
Position	Player	Transferred from	Date	Source
DF	(Sweden) Felix Beijmo	(Sweden) Djurgårdens IF	1 July 2018	
FW	(Germany) Martin Harnik	(Germany) Hannover 96	1 July 2018	
MF	(Germany) Kevin Möhwald	(Germany) 1. FC Nürnberg	1 July 2018	
FW	(Japan) Yuya Osako	(Germany) 1. FC Köln	1 July 2018	
DF	(Germany) Jan-Niklas Beste	(Germany) Borussia Dortmund	4 July 2018	
MF	(Netherlands) Davy Klaassen	(England) Everton	27 July 2018	
FW	(Peru) Claudio Pizarro		29 July 2018	
GK	(Greece) Stefanos Kapino	(England) Nottingham Forest	1 August 2018	
MF	(Turkey) Nuri Şahin	(Germany) Borussia Dortmund	31 August 2018	
MF	(Austria) Romano Schmid	(Austria) Red Bull Salzburg	3 January 2019	

=== Transfers Out ===
Position	Player	Transferred to	Date	Source
MF	(Denmark) Thomas Delaney	(Germany) Borussia Dortmund	1 July 2018	
DF	(Switzerland) Ulisses Garcia	(Switzerland) Young Boys	1 July 2018	
MF	(Germany) Jérôme Gondorf	(Germany) SC Freiburg	1 July 2018	
DF	(Germany) Leon Guwara	(Netherlands) Utrecht	1 July 2018	
MF	(Austria) Zlatko Junuzović	(Austria) Red Bull Salzburg	1 July 2019	
MF	(Hungary) László Kleinheisler	(Kazakhstan) Astana	1 July 2018	
MF	(Mali) Sambou Yatabaré	(Belgium) Antwerp	1 July 2019	
FW	(Germany) Lennart Thy	(Turkey) BB Erzurumspor	23 July 2019	
DF	(Senegal) Fallou Diagne	(Turkey) Konyaspor	2 August 2019	
GK	(Czech Republic) Jaroslav Drobný	(Germany) Fortuna Düsseldorf	13 January 2019	
MF	(Austria) Florian Kainz	(Germany) 1. FC Köln	18 January 2019	
DF	(Italy) Luca Caldirola	(Italy) Benevento	30 January 2019	

== Friendly matches ==
Win Draw Loss

15 July 2017 Friendly	Příbram	1–1	Werder Bremen	Zillertal
	Matousek 69'	Report	Sargent 8'	Stadium: Parkstadion; Attendance: 800

== Competitions ==
Win Draw Loss

=== Overview ===
Competition	First match	Last match	Starting round	Final position	Record							
Competition	First match	Last match	Starting round	Final position	Pld	W	D	L	GF	GA	GD	Win %
Bundesliga	25 August 2018	18 May 2019	Matchday 1		34	14	11	9	58	49	+9	41.18
DFB-Pokal	18 August 2018	24 April 2019	First round	Semi-finals	5	3	1	1	18	8	+10	60.00
Total					39	17	12	10	76	57	+19	43.59

Last updated: 25 May 2019
Source: Competitions

=== Bundesliga ===
==== League table ====
Pos	Team	Pld	W	D	L	GF	GA	GD	Pts	Qualification or relegation
6	VfL Wolfsburg	34	16	7	11	62	50	+12	55	Qualification for the Europa League group stage (Note: Since the winners of the 2018–19 DFB-Pokal, Bayern Munich, qualified for the Champions League based on league position, the Europa League group stage spot was passed to the sixth-placed team, and the Europa League second qualifying round spot was passed to the seventh-placed team.)
7	Eintracht Frankfurt	34	15	9	10	60	48	+12	54	Qualification for the Europa League second qualifying round
8	Werder Bremen	34	14	11	9	58	49	+9	53	
9	1899 Hoffenheim	34	13	12	9	70	52	+18	51	
10	Fortuna Düsseldorf	34	13	5	16	49	65	−16	44	

Source: DFB
Rules for classification: 1) Points; 2) Goal difference; 3) Goals scored; 4) Head-to-head results; 5) Head-to-head away goals scored; 6) Away goals scored; 7) Play-off

==== Results summary ====
Overall								Home						Away					
Pld	W	D	L	GF	GA	GD	Pts	W	D	L	GF	GA	GD	W	D	L	GF	GA	GD
34	14	11	9	58	49	+9	53	8	6	3	35	26	+9	6	5	6	23	23	0

Last updated: 25 May 2019.
Source: Bundesliga

==== Results by round ====
Round	1	2	3	4	5	6	7	8	9	10	11	12	13	14	15	16	17	18	19	20	21	22	23	24	25	26	27	28	29	30	31	32	33	34
Ground	H	A	H	A	H	A	H	A	H	A	H	A	H	H	A	H	A	A	H	A	H	A	H	A	H	A	H	A	H	A	A	H	A	H
Result	D	W	D	W	W	L	W	W	L	L	L	D	L	W	L	D	L	W	D	D	W	D	D	D	W	W	W	D	W	L	L	D	W	W
Position	9	6	7	4	3	5	4	3	4	6	7	7	9	8	9	9	10	9	11	10	10	10	9	10	9	8	6	8	7	8	9	9	9	8

Updated to match(es) played on 25 May 2019. Source: DFB
A = Away; H = Home; W = Win; D = Draw; L = Loss

==== Matches ====
25 August 2018 1	Werder Bremen	1–1	Hannover 96	Bremen
15:30 CEST (UTC+2)	Gebre Selassie 85'	Report	Weydandt 76'	Stadium: Weser-Stadion; Attendance: 42,100; Referee: Felix Brych

1 September 2018 2	Eintracht Frankfurt	1–2	Werder Bremen	Frankfurt
15:30 CEST (UTC+2)	Haller 54' (pen.)	Report	Osako 20'; Rashica 90+6'	Stadium: Commerzbank-Arena; Attendance: 50,000; Referee: Sören Storks

16 September 2018 3	Werder Bremen	1–1	1. FC Nürnberg	Bremen
15:30 CEST (UTC+2)	M. Eggestein 26'	Report	Misidjan 90+2'	Stadium: Weser-Stadion; Attendance: 42,100; Referee: Daniel Schlager

22 September 2018 4	FC Augsburg	2–3	Werder Bremen	Augsburg
15:30 CEST (UTC+2)	Koo 45+3'; Max 47'	Report	Kruse 34'; M. Eggestein 36'; Klaassen 75'	Stadium: WWK Arena; Attendance: 28,434; Referee: Felix Zwayer

25 September 2018 5	Werder Bremen	3–1	Hertha BSC	Bremen
18:30 CEST (UTC+2)	Harnik 11'; Veljković 45'; Kruse 66' (pen.)	Report	Dilrosun 53'	Stadium: Weser-Stadion; Attendance: 39,100; Referee: Guido Winkmann

29 September 2018 6	VfB Stuttgart	2–1	Werder Bremen	Stuttgart
15:30 CEST (UTC+2)	Donis 19'; Castro 75'	Report	Zieler 68' (o.g.)	Stadium: Mercedes-Benz Arena; Attendance: 58,569; Referee: Tobias Welz

5 October 2018 7	Werder Bremen	2–0	VfL Wolfsburg	Bremen
20:30 CEST (UTC+2)	Klaassen 35'; J. Eggestein 86'	Report		Stadium: Weser-Stadion; Attendance: 42,100; Referee: Martin Petersen

20 October 2018 8	Schalke 04	0–2	Werder Bremen	Gelsenkirchen
18:30 CEST (UTC+2)		Report	M. Eggestein 43', 66'	Stadium: Veltins-Arena; Attendance: 62,271; Referee: Christian Dingert

28 October 2018 9	Werder Bremen	2–6	Bayer Leverkusen	Bremen
18:00 CET (UTC+1)	Pizarro 60'; Osako 62'	Report	Volland 8'; Brandt 38'; Bellarabi 45'; Havertz 67', 77'; Dragović 72'	Stadium: Weser-Stadion; Attendance: 40,400; Referee: Marco Fritz

4 November 2018 10	Mainz 05	2–1	Werder Bremen	Mainz
18:00 CET (UTC+1)	Mateta 25'; Gbamin 51'	Report	Pizarro 78'	Stadium: Opel Arena; Attendance: 25,105; Referee: Guido Winkmann

10 November 2018 11	Werder Bremen	1–3	Borussia Mönchengladbach	Bremen
15:30 CET (UTC+1)	Şahin 59'	Report	Pléa 39', 48', 52'	Stadium: Weser-Stadion; Attendance: 42,100; Referee: Sören Storks

25 November 2018 12	SC Freiburg	1–1	Werder Bremen	Freiburg
15:30 CET (UTC+1)	Waldschmidt 42' (pen.)	Report	Augustinsson 90+2'	Stadium: Schwarzwald-Stadion; Attendance: 24,000; Referee: Bastian Dankert

1 December 2018 13	Werder Bremen	1–2	Bayern Munich	Bremen
15:30 CET (UTC+1)	Osako 33'	Report	Gnabry 20', 50'	Stadium: Weser-Stadion; Attendance: 42,100; Referee: Christian Dingert

7 December 2018 14	Werder Bremen	3–1	Fortuna Düsseldorf	Bremen
20:30 CET (UTC+1)	Möhwald 20'; Harnik 71'; Sargent 78'	Report	Lukebakio 43' (pen.)	Stadium: Weser-Stadion; Attendance: 41,500; Referee: Marco Fritz

15 December 2018 15	Borussia Dortmund	2–1	Werder Bremen	Dortmund
18:30 CET (UTC+1)	Alcácer 19'; Reus 27'	Report	Kruse 35'	Stadium: Signal Iduna Park; Attendance: 81,365; Referee: Guido Winkmann

19 December 2018 16	Werder Bremen	1–1	1899 Hoffenheim	Bremen
20:30 CET (UTC+1)	Gebre Selassie 57'	Report	Bittencourt 31'	Stadium: Weser-Stadion; Attendance: 40,003; Referee: Markus Schmidt

22 December 2018 17	RB Leipzig	3–2	Werder Bremen	Leipzig
15:30 CET (UTC+1)	Klostermann 22'; Werner 44'; Bruma 87'	Report	Kruse 67'; Sargent 77'	Stadium: Red Bull Arena; Attendance: 40,455; Referee: Bibiana Steinhaus

19 January 2019 18	Hannover 96	0–1	Werder Bremen	Hanover
15:30 CET (UTC+1)		Report	Rashica 32'	Stadium: HDI-Arena; Attendance: 44,300; Referee: Marco Fritz

26 January 2019 19	Werder Bremen	2–2	Eintracht Frankfurt	Bremen
18:30 CET (UTC+1)	M. Eggestein 27'; Harnik 52'	Report	Rebić 35'; Haller 68' (pen.)	Stadium: Weser-Stadion; Attendance: 42,100; Referee: Markus Schmidt

2 February 2019 20	1. FC Nürnberg	1–1	Werder Bremen	Nuremberg
15:30 CET (UTC+1)	Ishak 86'	Report	J. Eggestein 63'	Stadium: Max-Morlock-Stadion; Attendance: 35,753; Referee: Robert Kampka

10 February 2019 21	Werder Bremen	4–0	FC Augsburg	Bremen
15:30 CET (UTC+1)	Rashica 5', 28'; J. Eggestein 27'; Möhwald 83'	Report		Stadium: Weser-Stadion; Attendance: 40,138; Referee: Manuel Gräfe

16 February 2019 22	Hertha BSC	1–1	Werder Bremen	Berlin
18:30 CET (UTC+1)	Selke 25'	Report	Pizarro 90+6'	Stadium: Olympiastadion Berlin; Attendance: 49,627; Referee: Sören Storks

22 February 2019 23	Werder Bremen	1–1	VfB Stuttgart	Bremen
20:30 CET (UTC+1)	Klaassen 45'	Report	Zuber 1'	Stadium: Weser-Stadion; Attendance: 41,000; Referee: Robert Hartmann

3 March 2019 24	VfL Wolfsburg	1–1	Werder Bremen	Wolfsburg
18:00 CET (UTC+1)	Brooks 54'	Report	Kruse 74'	Stadium: Volkswagen Arena; Attendance: 28,101; Referee: Daniel Siebert

8 March 2019 25	Werder Bremen	4–2	Schalke 04	Bremen
20:30 CET (UTC+1)	Rashica 31', 73'; Kruse 51' (pen.); Harnik 90+4'	Report	Embolo 26', 85'	Stadium: Weser-Stadion; Attendance: 42,100; Referee: Martin Petersen

17 March 2019 26	Bayer Leverkusen	1–3	Werder Bremen	Leverkusen
13:30 CET (UTC+1)	Bailey 75'	Report	Kruse 13', 90+5'; Rashica 37'	Stadium: BayArena; Attendance: 30,210; Referee: Deniz Aytekin

30 March 2019 27	Werder Bremen	3–1	Mainz 05	Bremen
15:30 CET (UTC+1)	Rashica 3'; Kruse 36', 63'	Report	Quaison 52'	Stadium: Weser-Stadion; Attendance: 40,711; Referee: Marco Fritz

7 April 2019 28	Borussia Mönchengladbach	1–1	Werder Bremen	Mönchengladbach
18:00 CEST (UTC+2)	Neuhaus 49'	Report	Klaassen 79'	Stadium: Borussia-Park; Attendance: 54,022; Referee: Daniel Schlager

13 April 2019 29	Werder Bremen	2–1	SC Freiburg	Bremen
15:30 CEST (UTC+2)	Klaassen 76'; Gebre Selassie 84'	Report	Waldschmidt 90+3'	Stadium: Weser-Stadion; Attendance: 42,100; Referee: Bibiana Steinhaus

20 April 2019 30	Bayern Munich	1–0	Werder Bremen	Munich
15:30 CEST (UTC+2)	Süle 75'	Report		Stadium: Allianz Arena; Attendance: 75,000; Referee: Tobias Welz

27 April 2019 31	Fortuna Düsseldorf	4–1	Werder Bremen	Düsseldorf
15:30 CEST (UTC+2)	Raman 1'; Karaman 22'; Hennings 56'; Suttner 73'	Report	Kruse 28' (pen.)	Stadium: Merkur Spiel-Arena; Attendance: 52,500; Referee: Benjamin Cortus

4 May 2019 32	Werder Bremen	2–2	Borussia Dortmund	Bremen
18:30 CEST (UTC+2)	Möhwald 70'; Pizarro 75'	Report	Pulisic 6'; Alcácer 41'	Stadium: Weser-Stadion; Attendance: 42,100; Referee: Marco Fritz

11 May 2019 33	1899 Hoffenheim	0–1	Werder Bremen	Sinsheim
15:30 CEST (UTC+2)		Report	J. Eggestein 39'	Stadium: PreZero Arena; Attendance: 30,150; Referee: Bastian Dankert

18 May 2019 34	Werder Bremen	2–1	RB Leipzig	Bremen
15:30 CEST (UTC+2)	Rashica 35'; Pizarro 89'	Report	Mukiele 86'	Stadium: Weser-Stadion; Attendance: 42,100; Referee: Felix Brych

=== DFB-Pokal ===
18 August 2018 First round	Wormatia Worms	1–6	Werder Bremen	Worms
15:30 CEST (UTC+2)	Mimbala 44'	Report	Osako 9'; Kainz 21'; Bargfrede 31'; Kruse 41' (pen.); M. Eggestein 45+1'; J. Eggestein 79'	Stadium: EWR-Arena; Attendance: 5,500; Referee: Benedikt Kempkes

31 October 2018 Second round	Weiche Flensburg	1–5	Werder Bremen	Lübeck
18:30 CET (UTC+1)	Ilídio 27'	Report	Pizarro 8'; Kainz 38'; Klaassen 44' (pen.); Harnik 76', 81'	Stadium: Stadion Lohmühle; Attendance: 8,637; Referee: Tobias Reichel

5 February 2019 Round of 16	Borussia Dortmund	3–3 (a.e.t.) (2–4 p)	Werder Bremen	Dortmund
20:45 CET (UTC+1)	Reus 45+3'; Pulisic 105'; Hakimi 113'	Report	Rashica 5'; Pizarro 108'; Harnik 119'	Stadium: Signal Iduna Park; Attendance: 81,365; Referee: Felix Brych
	Penalties
	Alcácer (penalty missed); Philipp (penalty missed); Witsel (penalty scored); Weigl (penalty scored)		(penalty scored) Pizarro; (penalty scored) M. Eggestein; (penalty scored) Klaassen; (penalty scored) Kruse

3 April 2019 Quarter-finals	Schalke 04	0–2	Werder Bremen	Gelsenkirchen
20:45 CEST (UTC+2)		Report	Rashica 65'; Klaassen 72'	Stadium: Veltins-Arena; Attendance: 61,597; Referee: Deniz Aytekin

24 April 2019 Semi-finals	Werder Bremen	2–3	Bayern Munich	Bremen
20:45 CEST (UTC+2)	Osako 74'; Rashica 75'	Report	Lewandowski 36', 80' (pen.); Müller 63'	Stadium: Weser-Stadion; Attendance: 42,100; Referee: Daniel Siebert

== Statistics ==
=== Appearances and goals ===
No.	Pos	Nat	Player	Total		Bundesliga		DFB-Pokal	
No.	Pos	Nat	Player	Apps	Goals	Apps	Goals	Apps	Goals
Goalkeepers
1	GK	(Czech Republic) CZE	Jiří Pavlenka	39	0	34	0	5	0
27	GK	(Greece) GRE	Stefanos Kapino	1	0	0+1	0	0	0
40	GK	(Germany) GER	Luca Plogmann	1	0	0+1	0	0	0
Defenders
2	DF	(Sweden) SWE	Felix Beijmo	0	0	0	0	0	0
5	DF	(Sweden) SWE	Ludwig Augustinsson	39	1	34	1	5	0
13	DF	(Serbia) SRB	Miloš Veljković	27	1	21+2	1	4	0
15	DF	(Germany) GER	Sebastian Langkamp	23	0	15+6	0	1+1	0
18	DF	(Finland) FIN	Niklas Moisander	34	0	30	0	4	0
23	DF	(Czech Republic) CZE	Theodor Gebre Selassie	36	3	32	3	4	0
32	DF	(Austria) AUT	Marco Friedl	9	0	5+2	0	2	0
36	DF	(Germany) GER	Thore Jacobsen	0	0	0	0	0	0
39	DF	(Germany) GER	Jan-Niklas Beste	0	0	0	0	0	0
Midfielders
6	MF	(Germany) GER	Kevin Möhwald	27	3	7+16	3	1+3	0
11	MF	(Kosovo) KOS	Milot Rashica	30	12	19+7	9	3+1	3
17	MF	(Turkey) TUR	Nuri Şahin	23	1	19+1	1	3	0
22	MF	(Germany) GER	Fin Bartels	2	0	0+2	0	0	0
30	MF	(Netherlands) NED	Davy Klaassen	38	7	33	5	5	2
34	MF	(Germany) GER	Jean-Manuel Mbom	0	0	0	0	0	0
35	MF	(Germany) GER	Maximilian Eggestein	39	6	34	5	5	1
44	MF	(Germany) GER	Philipp Bargfrede	17	1	13+2	0	2	1
Forwards
4	FW	(Peru) PER	Claudio Pizarro	30	7	3+23	5	1+3	2
8	FW	(Japan) JPN	Yuya Osako	23	5	15+6	3	2	2
9	FW	(Austria) AUT	Martin Harnik	22	7	10+8	4	0+4	3
10	FW	(Germany) GER	Max Kruse	36	12	32	11	4	1
19	FW	(United States) USA	Josh Sargent	10	2	1+9	2	0	0
20	FW	(United States) USA	Aron Jóhannsson	1	0	0+1	0	0	0
24	FW	(Germany) GER	Johannes Eggestein	28	5	12+11	4	2+3	1
Players transferred out during the season
16	GK	(Germany) GER	Michael Zetterer	0	0	0	0	0	0
33	GK	(Czech Republic) CZE	Jaroslav Drobný	0	0	0	0	0	0
7	MF	(Austria) AUT	Florian Kainz	10	2	5+3	0	2	2
14	MF	(Germany) GER	Ole Käuper	1	0	0	0	0+1	0

Last updated: 18 May 2019
Source: Competitions
