= Aron Jóhannsson =

American soccer player (born 1990)

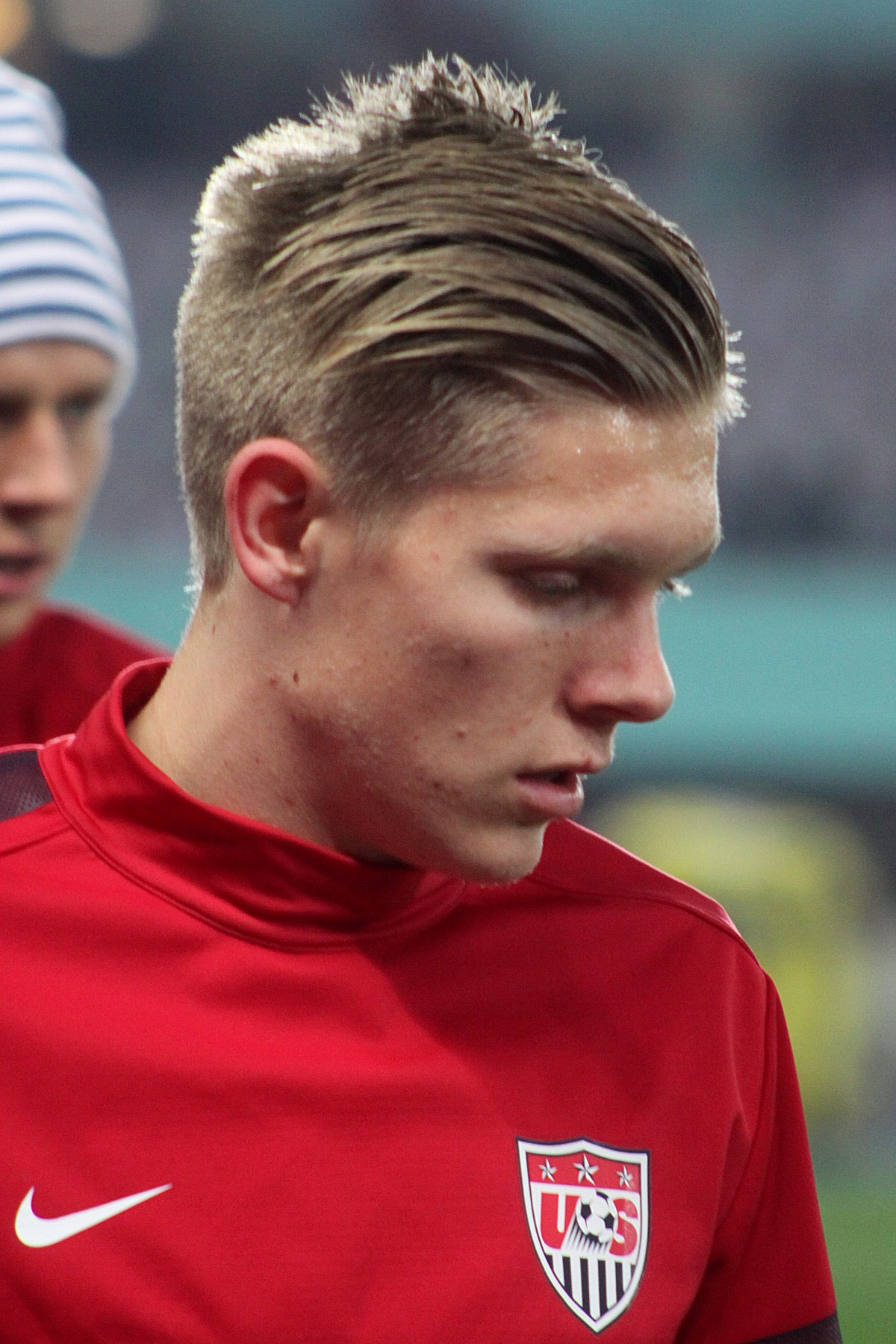
- Aron in 2013

Personal information
- Full name: Aron Jóhannsson
- Date of birth: November 10, 1990 (age 36)
- Place of birth: Mobile, Alabama, U.S.
- Height: 1.84 m (6 ft 0 in)
- Position: Striker

Youth career
- 2000–2004: Fjölnir
- 2005: Breiðablik
- 2006–2008: Fjölnir
- 2007–2008: IMG Soccer Academy

Senior career*
Years	Team	Apps	(Gls)
2008–2010	Fjölnir	37	(13)
2010–2013	Aarhus	65	(23)
2013–2015	AZ	58	(29)
2015–2019	Werder Bremen	28	(4)
2017	Werder Bremen II	2	(0)
2019–2020	Hammarby IF	32	(12)
2021	Lech Poznań	9	(2)
2021	→ Lech Poznań II	1	(2)
2021–2025	Valur	76	(19)

International career
2011–2012	Iceland U21	10	(1)
2013–2015	United States	19	(4)
- * Club domestic league appearances and goals

Aron Jóhannsson (born November 10, 1990) is an American former professional soccer player who played as a striker.

He began his career with Fjölnir and later played in the Danish Superliga for AGF before joining AZ in January 2013. After two-and-a-half seasons at the Eredivisie club, he was signed by Werder Bremen. His four years in Bundesliga was plagued by injuries, and he left in 2019 to revive his career with Hammarby IF in Allsvenskan.

Formerly an Iceland under-21 international, Aron made his senior debut for the United States in 2013. He represented the US at the 2014 FIFA World Cup and the 2015 CONCACAF Gold Cup, helping them to fourth place in the latter.

== Early life ==
Born to Icelandic parents who were students in Mobile, Alabama, United States, Aron moved to Iceland with his family at the age of three. Growing up, he spent most his life in Iceland while occasionally visiting the United States as well as spending one year and graduating in 2008 from The Pendleton School at the IMG Academy in Bradenton, Florida in the United States.

== Club career ==
=== Youth development ===
Aron started his youth career at his local club, Fjölnir, in Reykjavik, Iceland. In 2005, he moved to Breiðablik for one season, heading back to his former club the following year. He then spent the 2007–08 school year playing in the U.S. Football Development Academy for the IMG Academy squad based in Bradenton, Florida.

=== Fjölnir ===
Aron made his debut for Fjölnir in the 2008 Úrvalsdeild season. He became a regular in the side the following year, making a total of 37 league appearances for the club and scoring 13 goals in the process. 12 of those he scored in his last season with Fjölnir, when he was voted both the best and the most promising player of the first division. On top of that he was also the top scorer of the league.

=== AGF Aarhus ===
Aron attracted attention from foreign clubs during his second full season for Fjölnir, moving to AGF Aarhus in late August 2010. Following a fine performance in AGF's 3–2 win at Viborg FF on April 16, 2011, he was chosen as one of the team's starting strikers. Aron played the remaining games for AGF in the season, helping his team to the promotion to the Superliga. His first goal for AGF came in an away match in the Danish 1st Division against Hvidovre IF on April 28, 2011.

He made his debut in the Danish Superliga on July 18, 2011, in a 2–1 win against Lyngby BK. After 15 goalless matches, he finally scored his first goal in the Superliga in the away match against SønderjyskE on November 7, 2011, securing a 1–1 result.

Aron set a new record August 27, 2012 when he scored the fastest hattrick ever in the Danish Superliga, completing the hattrick in 3 minutes and 50 seconds against AC Horsens; he also scored their fourth goal of the match, giving AGF a 1–4 victory. It took him only 16 minutes to score the four goals, which is another record in the Superliga.

=== AZ Alkmaar ===
Aron joined AZ on January 29, 2013. He scored his first goal for the club on April 14, 2013.

On August 11, 2013, Aron scored from the penalty spot in a 3–2 win over reigning Eredivisie champions Ajax. Against Sparta Rotterdam he scored a hat trick in the Dutch Cup on September 25. Three days later, he scored the winning goal in a 2–1 win over PSV Eindhoven. On October 20. Aron netted a brace as AZ came from a goal back to record a 3–1 win.

=== Werder Bremen ===
==== 2015–16 season and long injury layoff ====
On August 5, 2015, Aron underwent a medical and signed for Werder Bremen on a four-year deal, for a fee reported to be in the region of €5 million. Just ten days later, on August 15, he made his debut replacing Levin Öztunalı after 57 minutes in Werder's first match of the 2015–2016 Bundesliga season, a 0–3 home defeat to Schalke 04. He made his full debut a week later in a 1–1 draw away to Hertha Berlin on the second matchday of the season, before scoring his first goal for Werder in his team's 2–1 defeat of Borussia Mönchengladbach on August 30, 2015, converting a penalty for 1–0. He picked up his second goal at Darmstadt 98 on September 22, the opening goal in a 2–1 defeat.

In early October, Aron was diagnosed with a nerve irritation in his right hip which Werder Bremen announced they would treat "in a conservative manner" and which would keep him out of action for a minimum of three weeks. On October 28, he underwent hip surgery that would leave him unable to play for "the coming weeks". However, after multiple attempts at a comeback, his season was ruled to be over by club CEO Thomas Eichin on March 24. Coming into the club with high expectations, Aron was not really able to prove his worth during his first season. He made six appearances before his season-ending injury, scoring two goals.

==== 2016–17 season ====
After being expected to miss the beginning of the 2016–17 season as well, Aron started in the opening match, a 6–0 defeat away to Bayern Munich, returning after an eleven-month layoff. He scored his first goal of the campaign in his second appearance, converting a penalty in a 1–2 defeat to FC Augsburg. The following week, in a substitute appearance against Mönchengladbach, Aron assisted Serge Gnabry's goal. However, he was sent off for cursing, in English, at the referee, for which he was banned two matches and fined €8,000. In the days following the incident, Aron claimed he was misheard, but when he tried to explain to the referee his version, he said that the referee "stayed by his opinion". In addition, that was manager Viktor Skrypnyk's last game in charge, before he was sacked and replaced with reserve manager Alexander Nouri. Following Aron's suspension, he began losing playing time to young center forward Ousman Manneh, and acknowledged at the end of his suspension that a return to the starting lineup would "certainly not be simple".

With Aron yet to make a start under Nouri at the end of October, assistant coach Markus Feldhoff voiced his concerns about his match fitness, which Aron argued was "very near 100%", regarding his recent return from a lengthy injury. After making two substitute appearances in February in defeats against Augsburg and Borussia Mönchengladbach, he did not feature in Werder's following four matches during which the team amassed ten points.

==== 2017–18 season ====
Until Nouri's dismissal in October 2017, Aron hardly featured and often did not make the squad playing a total of 80 minutes in seven substitute appearances.

During the 2017–18 winter training camp, new manager Florian Kohfeldt praised Aron's competitive spirit. On February 3, 2018, Aron was involved in two goals in Werder Bremen 2–1 win away to Schalke 04 after coming as a substitute, This performance earned him a place in the starting lineup in the DFB-Pokal quarter-final match against Bayer Leverkusen three days later. He scored for 2–0 but Werder Bremen lost 4–2 after extra-time. From mid-March, he was repeatedly kept out of action with hamstring problems. In early May, Werder Bremen announced Aron would miss the rest of the season due to injury.

==== 2018–19 season ====
Aron was sidelined with an ankle injury in July 2018 und underwent surgery in November. He returned to team training in late February 2019. On the last matchday of the season, he made his farewell from the club during the pre-match ceremony and was given a short substitute appearance by manager Kohfeldt. In his four seasons at the club, he made a total of 30 appearances across all competitions scoring five goals while being repeatedly kept out of action by injuries.

=== Hammarby IF ===
In July 2019, Aron joined Allsvenskan club Hammarby IF on a three-year contract.

In 2020, Aron was Hammarby's top scorer in Allsvenskan, scoring twelve goals in 22 appearances, although the side disappointedly finished 8th in the table. He decided to terminate his contract with the club at the end of the year.

=== Lech Poznań ===
Free agent Aron joined Ekstraklasa club Lech Poznań in February 2021, having agreed a contract until the end of 2021 with the option of an 18-month extension until summer 2023. At the time, the club placed 10th out of 16 teams in the league. He started and scored a game-winning goal in his debut game against Śląsk Wrocław on February 21.

Having picked up an arm injury in a reserve team's league game that would keep him sidelined for the rest of the year, he left the club by mutual consent on the last day of the summer transfer window.

=== Valur ===
On November 4, 2021, Aron returned to Iceland to sign with Úrvalsdeild side Valur.

Aron announced his retirement from playing in November 2026.

== International career ==
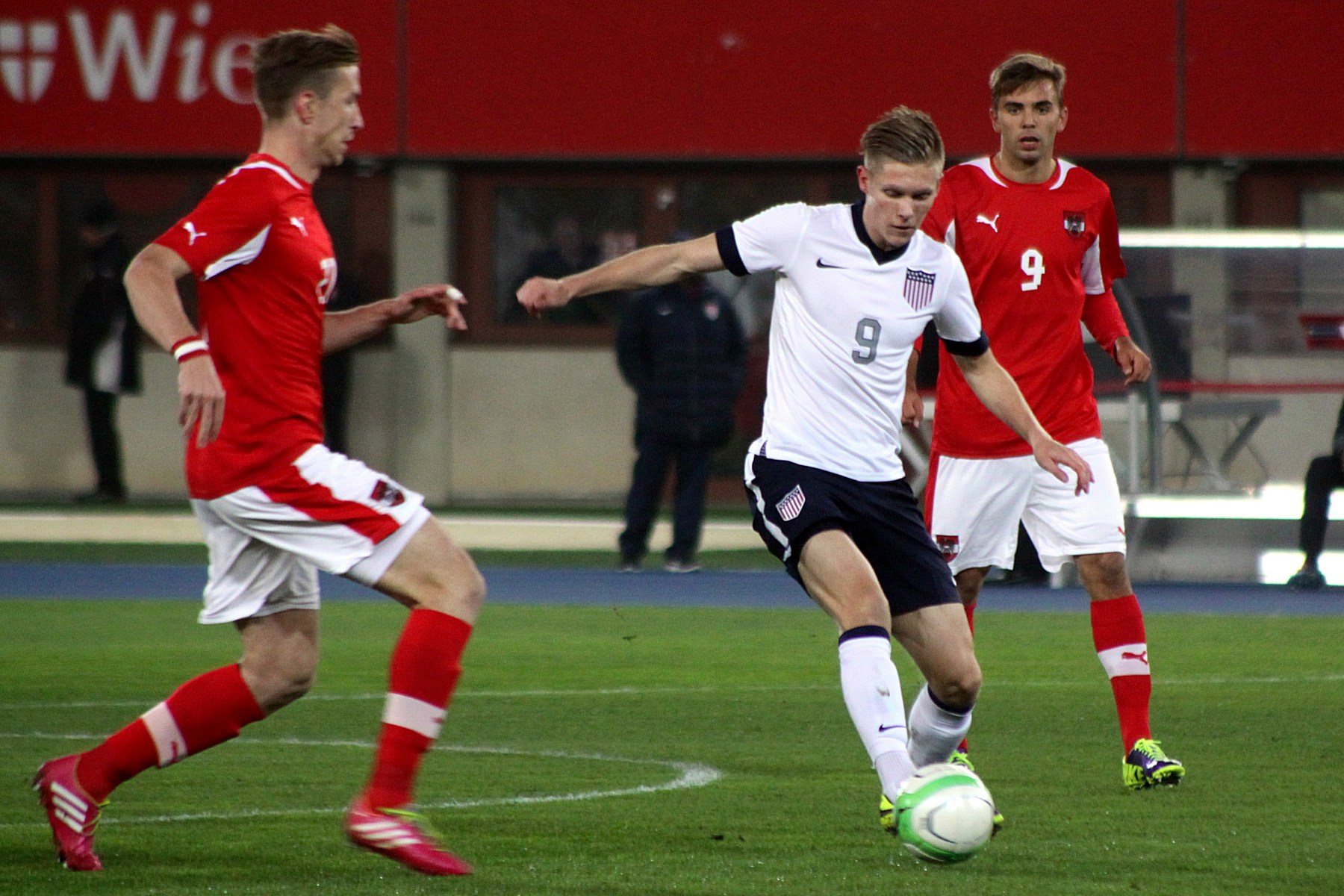
Aron in action against Austria in a 2013 friendly

After a string of good performances in the Danish Superliga in 2012, Aron received his first call-up to the Iceland squad on October 3, 2012, for the World Cup qualifiers against Switzerland and Albania. However, he did not appear due to a groin injury.

Due to being a U.S. citizen through his birth in the United States, Aron was also eligible to play for the United States national football team. In May 2013, U.S. coach Jürgen Klinsmann stated that the U.S. team was keeping a "very close eye" on Aron. On August 13, his switch from Iceland was approved by FIFA.

Aron's decision to choose the United States over Iceland was widely criticized in his home country. In a written statement The Football Association of Iceland (KSÍ) urged the player to reconsider his decision, claiming that the player – who grew up in Iceland – had "no link to soccer in the USA at all" and that there was no logic behind him "relinquishing his Icelandic football identity".

Aron made his first appearance for the United States in their 4–3 friendly victory over Bosnia and Herzegovina in Sarajevo the next day, coming on for Eddie Johnson in the 63rd minute. In the final World Cup qualifying game against Panama on October 15, 2013, he scored his first goal in the final minute, securing a 3–2 win. He was included on Klinsmann's 23-man squad for the 2014 FIFA World Cup, coming on for an injured Jozy Altidore in the 23rd minute of the opening game against Ghana for his tournament debut.

Aron was part of the American squad which came fourth at the 2015 CONCACAF Gold Cup, scoring their third goal in a 6–0 quarter-final win over Cuba in at the M&T Bank Stadium in Baltimore; set up by a 50-yard pass by captain Michael Bradley, he chipped goalkeeper Diosvelis Guerra from the edge of the penalty area.

In March 2018, he was called up by interim coach Dave Sarachan for a friendly match against Paraguay but was forced to pull out due an injury.

== Career statistics ==
=== Club ===
Appearances and goals by club, season and competition
Club	Season	League			National cup (Note: Includes Icelandic Cup, Danish Cup, KNVB Cup, DFB-Pokal, Svenska Cupen, Polish Cup)		League cup (Note: Includes Icelandic League Cup)		Continental		Other		Total	
Club	Season	Division	Apps	Goals	Apps	Goals	Apps	Goals	Apps	Goals	Apps	Goals	Apps	Goals
Fjölnir	2008	Úrvalsdeild	3	0	0	0	—		—		—		3	0
Fjölnir	2009	Úrvalsdeild	16	1	1	0	5	0	—		—		22	1
Fjölnir	2010	1. deild karla	18	12	3	4	5	1	—		—		26	17
Fjölnir	Total		37	13	4	4	10	1	0	0	0	0	51	18
AGF	2010–11	1. Division	17	2	1	0	—		—		—		18	2
AGF	2011–12	Superliga	30	7	2	1	—		—		—		32	8
AGF	2012–13	Superliga	18	14	0	0	—		2 (Note: Appearances in UEFA Europa League)	0	—		20	14
AGF	Total		65	23	3	1	0	0	2	0	0	0	70	24
AZ Alkmaar	2012–13	Eredivisie	5	3	1	0	—		—		—		6	3
AZ Alkmaar	2013–14	Eredivisie	32	17	4	6	—		14	2	3 (Note: One appearance and one goal in Johan Cruyff Shield; two appearance in Europa League play-offs)	1	53	26
AZ Alkmaar	2014–15	Eredivisie	21	9	3	0	—		1	0	—		25	9
AZ Alkmaar	Total		58	29	8	6	0	0	15	2	3	1	84	38
Werder Bremen	2015–16	Bundesliga	6	2	0	0	—		—		—		6	2
Werder Bremen	2016–17	Bundesliga	9	1	0	0	—		—		—		9	1
Werder Bremen	2017–18	Bundesliga	12	1	2	1	—		—		—		14	2
Werder Bremen	2018–19	Bundesliga	1	0	0	0	—		—		—		1	0
Werder Bremen	Total		28	4	2	1	0	0	0	0	0	0	30	5
Hammarby IF	2019	Allsvenskan	10	0	0	0	—		—		—		10	0
Hammarby IF	2020	Allsvenskan	22	12	3	3	—		2	0	—		27	15
Hammarby IF	Total		32	12	3	3	0	0	2	0	0	0	37	15
Lech Poznań	2020–21	Ekstraklasa	9	2	1	0	—		—		—		10	2
Lech Poznań II	2021–22	II liga	1	2	0	0	—		—		—		1	2
Valur	2022	Besta deild karla	20	7	1	0	—		—		—		21	7
Valur	2023	Besta deild karla	25	9	1	0	—		—		—		26	9
Valur	2024	Besta deild karla	16	0	2	1	—		—		1 (Note: Appearance in Icelandic Super Cup)	0	19	1
Valur	Total		61	16	4	1	0	0	0	0	1	0	66	17
Career total			291	101	25	16	10	1	19	2	4	1	349	121

=== International ===
Appearances and goals by national team and year
National team	Year	Apps	Goals
United States	2013	6	1
United States	2014	3	1
United States	2015	10	2
Total		19	4

Scores and results list United States' goal tally first, score column indicates score after each Aron goal.

List of international goals scored by Aron Jóhannsson
No.	Date	Venue	Opponent	Score	Result	Competition
1	October 15, 2013	Estadio Rommel Fernández, Panama City, Panama	Panama	3–2	3–2	2014 FIFA World Cup qualifier
2	May 27, 2014	Candlestick Park, San Francisco, California, United States	Azerbaijan	2–0	2–0	Friendly
3	March 25, 2015	NRGi Park, Aarhus, Denmark	Denmark	2–1	2–3	Friendly
4	July 18, 2015	M&T Bank Stadium, Baltimore, Maryland, United States	Cuba	3–0	6–0	2015 CONCACAF Gold Cup

== Honors ==
AGF

- Danish 1st Division: 2010–11

AZ

- KNVB Cup: 2012–13

Valur

- Icelandic League Cup: 2023
