= Mohamed Aidara =

Mohamed Aidara may refer to:

- Mohamed Aidara (footballer, born 1989), Senegalese football midfielder for Altona Magic
- Mohamed Aidara (footballer, born 1996), Ivorian football centre-back for Vizela
