= Philipp Eggersglüß =

German footballer

Personal information
- Date of birth: 28 April 1995 (age 31)
- Place of birth: Soltau, Germany
- Height: 1.82 m (6 ft 0 in)
- Position: Right-back

Team information
- Current team: Atlas Delmenhorst
- Number: 21

Youth career
- –2012: FC Verden 04
- 2012–2014: Werder Bremen

Senior career*
Years	Team	Apps	(Gls)
2014–2018	Werder Bremen II	73	(2)
2018–2020	Rot-Weiß Oberhausen	40	(3)
2020–	Atlas Delmenhorst	62	(3)
- * Club domestic league appearances and goals as of 1 July 2024

Philipp Eggersglüß (born 28 April 1995) is a German footballer who plays as a right-back for Atlas Delmenhorst.

== Club career ==
Eggersglüß joined Werder Bremen in 2012 from FC Verden 04. On 1 November 2015, he scored on his professional debut in Werder Bremen II's 3–2 defeat of Chemnitzer FC. In May 2018, following Werder Bremen II's relegation from the 3. Liga, it was announced Eggersglüß would be one of ten players to leave the club.

In June 2018, Eggersglüß joined Regionalliga West side Rot-Weiß Oberhausen.

== Career statistics ==
As of 18 May 2018

Appearances and goals by club, season and competition
Club	Season	League			Cup		Total	
Club	Season	League	Apps	Goals	Apps	Goals	Apps	Goals
Werder Bremen II	2014–15	Regionalliga Nord	12	0	—		12	0
Werder Bremen II	2015–16	3. Liga	11	2	—		11	2
Werder Bremen II	2016–17	3. Liga	14	0	—		14	0
Werder Bremen II	2017–18	3. Liga	36	0	—		36	0
Career total			73	2	0	0	73	2
