= Maurice Hehne =

German footballer

Personal information
- Date of birth: 24 April 1997 (age 29)
- Place of birth: Pößneck, Germany
- Height: 1.86 m (6 ft 1 in)
- Position: Centre-back

Team information
- Current team: Carl Zeiss Jena
- Number: 6

Youth career
- 2002–2006: VfB Pößneck
- 2006–2013: Carl Zeiss Jena
- 2013–2016: Werder Bremen

Senior career*
Years	Team	Apps	(Gls)
2016–2017	Werder Bremen II	1	(0)
2017–2019	Hannover 96 II	52	(2)
2019–2021	FSV Zwickau	42	(2)
2021–	Carl Zeiss Jena	108	(3)
- * Club domestic league appearances and goals as of 23 September 2026

Maurice Hehne (born 14 April 1997) is a German footballer who plays as a centre-back for Carl Zeiss Jena.

== Career ==
Hehne began his career in his hometown with VfB Pößneck before moving to the youth academy of Carl Zeiss Jena. In 2013, he left Jena to join Bremen's U-17 team. On 14 May 2016, he made his debut replacing Ousman Manneh in the 83rd minute of Werder Bremen II's 2–1 win at VfR Aalen.
