= Maximilian Eggestein =

German footballer

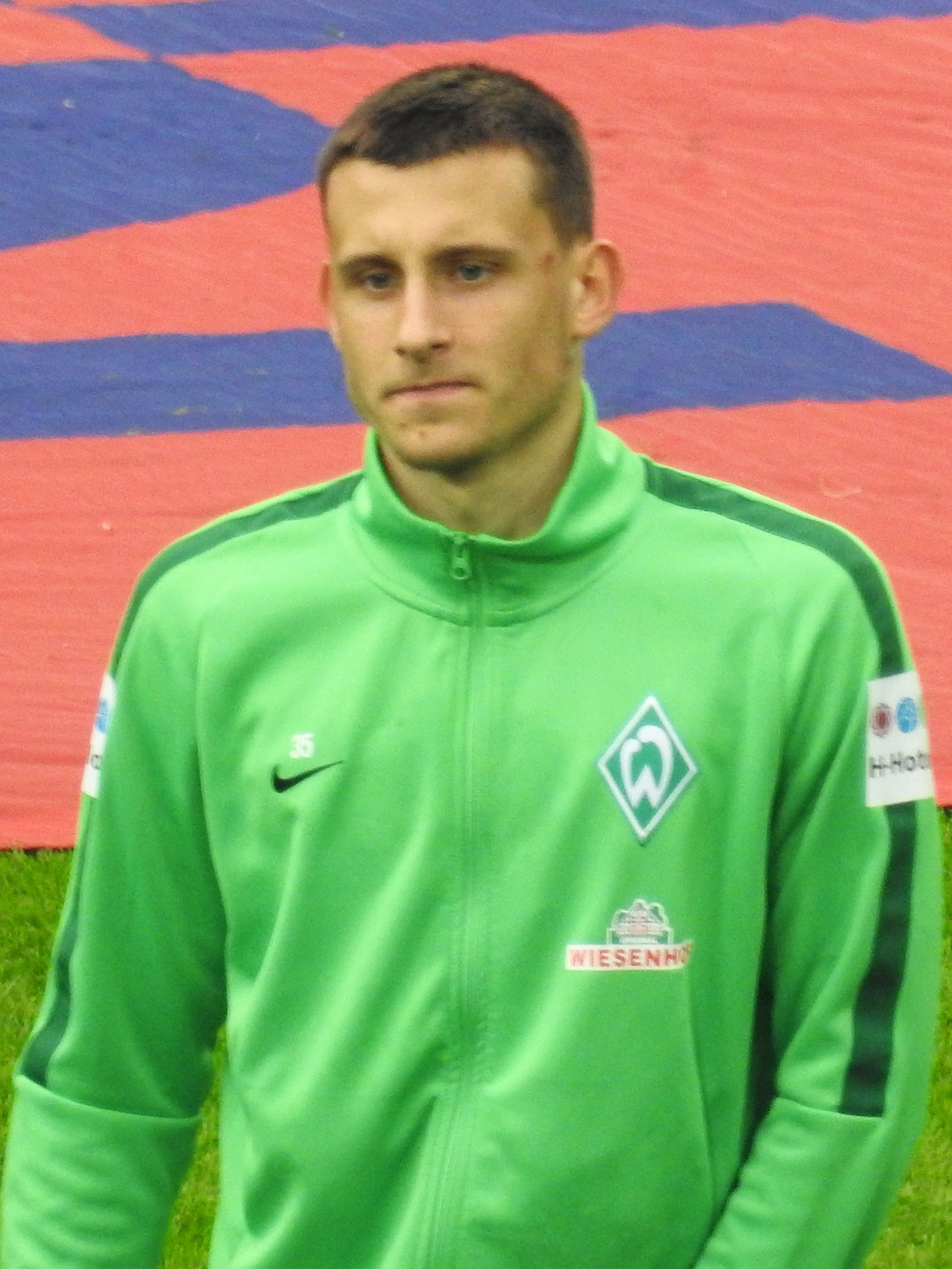
- Eggestein training with Werder Bremen in 2017

Personal information
- Date of birth: 8 December 1996 (age 29)
- Place of birth: Hanover, Germany
- Height: 1.81 m (5 ft 11 in)
- Position: Defensive midfielder

Team information
- Current team: SC Freiburg
- Number: 8

Youth career
- TSV Schloß Ricklingen
- –2011: TSV Havelse
- 2011–2014: Werder Bremen

Senior career*
| Years | Team | Apps | (Gls) |
| 2014–2017 | Werder Bremen II | 54 | (7) |
| 2014–2021 | Werder Bremen | 159 | (12) |
| 2021– | SC Freiburg | 170 | (11) |

International career^{‡}
| 2015 | Germany U20 | 6 | (1) |
| 2017–2019 | Germany U21 | 16 | (1) |
| 2019 | Germany | 0 | (0) |
Medal record
UEFA European Under-21 Championship
| Runner-up | 2019 |
- * Club domestic league appearances and goals as of 17:30, 31 October 2026 (UTC) ‡ National team caps and goals as of 30 June 2019

Maximilian Eggestein (German pronunciation: [maksiˈmiːli̯aːn ˈʔɛɡəʃtaɪn]; born 8 December 1996) is a German professional footballer who plays as a defensive midfielder for SC Freiburg. He is also the older brother of fellow professional footballer Johannes Eggestein.

== Club career ==
=== Werder Bremen ===
Eggestein joined Werder Bremen in 2011 from TSV Havelse. He made his debut for Werder Bremen II on 1 August 2014 against Eintracht Braunschweig II.

On 29 November 2014, he made his first team debut in a Bundesliga game against SC Paderborn replacing Levent Ayçiçek after 83 minutes in a 4–0 home win. In February 2015 Eggestein signed his first professional contract, committing to the club till 2018. In the following 2015–2016 season, he made his full debut featuring in the number 10 role as Werder played Hertha Berlin on 22 August 2015.

In July 2017, Eggestein agreed a contract extension with the club. That season, his younger brother Johannes also gradually became established in the first team squad.

On 18 August 2018, Eggestein scored his first goal of the 2018–19 season, in a 6–1 win against Wormatia Worms in the first round of the DFB-Pokal. On 10 April 2019, Werder Bremen announced the extension of Eggestein's contract.

=== SC Freiburg ===
Eggestein moved to SC Freiburg in August 2021, following Werder Bremen's relegation from the Bundesliga and after ten years with the club.

== International career ==
Eggestein is a youth international for Germany at the U20 level. Eggestein was called up to the senior national team for a friendly match against Serbia on March 20 and the Euro 2020 qualifying match against the Netherlands on March 24, 2019, but did not play in either game.

== Career statistics ==
As of match played 31 October 2026

Appearances and goals by club, season and competition
| Club | Season | League | | | DFB-Pokal | | Europe | | Other | | Total | |
| Club | Season | Division | Apps | Goals | Apps | Goals | Apps | Goals | Apps | Goals | Apps | Goals |
|---|---|---|---|---|---|---|---|---|---|---|---|---|
| Werder Bremen II | 2014–15 | Regionalliga Nord | 32 | 4 | — | | — | | 2 (Note: Appearances in Regionalliga promotion play-offs) | 0 | 34 | 4 |
| Werder Bremen II | 2015–16 | 3. Liga | 9 | 1 | — | | — | | — | | 9 | 1 |
| Werder Bremen II | 2016–17 | 3. Liga | 13 | 2 | — | | — | | — | | 13 | 2 |
| Werder Bremen II | Total | | 54 | 7 | 0 | 0 | — | | 2 | 0 | 56 | 7 |
| Werder Bremen | 2014–15 | Bundesliga | 2 | 0 | 0 | 0 | — | | — | | 2 | 0 |
| Werder Bremen | 2015–16 | Bundesliga | 7 | 0 | 1 | 0 | — | | — | | 8 | 0 |
| Werder Bremen | 2016–17 | Bundesliga | 15 | 1 | 0 | 0 | — | | — | | 15 | 1 |
| Werder Bremen | 2017–18 | Bundesliga | 33 | 2 | 4 | 1 | — | | — | | 37 | 3 |
| Werder Bremen | 2018–19 | Bundesliga | 34 | 5 | 5 | 1 | — | | — | | 39 | 6 |
| Werder Bremen | 2019–20 | Bundesliga | 32 | 1 | 4 | 0 | — | | 2 (Note: Appearances in Bundesliga relegation play-offs) | 0 | 40 | 1 |
| Werder Bremen | 2020–21 | Bundesliga | 33 | 2 | 5 | 0 | — | | — | | 38 | 2 |
| Werder Bremen | 2021–22 | 2. Bundesliga | 3 | 1 | 1 | 0 | — | | — | | 4 | 1 |
| Werder Bremen | Total | | 159 | 12 | 20 | 2 | — | | 2 | 0 | 181 | 14 |
| SC Freiburg | 2021–22 | Bundesliga | 31 | 1 | 5 | 1 | — | | — | | 36 | 2 |
| SC Freiburg | 2022–23 | Bundesliga | 31 | 1 | 5 | 0 | 7 (Note: Appearances in UEFA Europa League) | 0 | — | | 43 | 1 |
| SC Freiburg | 2023–24 | Bundesliga | 33 | 1 | 2 | 1 | 10 | 1 | — | | 45 | 3 |
| SC Freiburg | 2024–25 | Bundesliga | 33 | 2 | 3 | 0 | — | | — | | 36 | 2 |
| SC Freiburg | 2025–26 | Bundesliga | 34 | 3 | 5 | 1 | 14 | 2 | — | | 53 | 6 |
| SC Freiburg | 2026–27 | Bundesliga | 8 | 3 | 2 | 0 | 4 (Note: Appearances in UEFA Conference League) | 1 | — | | 14 | 4 |
| SC Freiburg | Total | | 170 | 11 | 22 | 3 | 35 | 4 | — | | 227 | 18 |
| Career total | | | 383 | 30 | 42 | 5 | 35 | 4 | 4 | 0 | 464 | 39 |

== Honours ==
SC Freiburg

- UEFA Europa League runner-up: 2025–26

Individual

- UEFA Europa League Team of the Season: 2025–26
