= Dominic Volkmer =

German footballer

Personal information
- Date of birth: 27 April 1996 (age 30)
- Place of birth: Bremen, Germany
- Height: 1.94 m (6 ft 4 in)
- Position: Centre-back

Team information
- Current team: VfL Bochum II
- Number: 4

Youth career
- Werder Bremen
- SC Borgfeld
- Werder Bremen
- –2014: SC Weyhe
- 2014–2015: JFV Nordwest

Senior career*
Years	Team	Apps	(Gls)
2015–2016	VfB Oldenburg	33	(1)
2016–2018	Werder Bremen II	62	(1)
2018–2019	Jahn Regensburg	2	(0)
2019	→ Carl Zeiss Jena (loan)	17	(0)
2019–2020	Carl Zeiss Jena	19	(0)
2020–2022	MSV Duisburg	14	(0)
2023	Atlas Delmenhorst	6	(1)
2023–2024	TuS Koblenz	32	(1)
2024–2025	TSV Steinbach Haiger	39	(0)
2026–	VfL Bochum II	19	(0)
- * Club domestic league appearances and goals as of 23 September 2026

Dominic Volkmer (born 27 April 1996) is a German professional footballer who plays as a centre-back for VfL Bochum II.

== Career ==
Volkmer started playing in Werder Bremen's youth system. Following stints at SC Borgfeld and SC Weyhe he joined VfB Oldenburg where he made 31 appearances scoring one goal in the Regionalliga Nord.

In summer 2016, Volkmer joined Werder Bremen II in the 3. Liga signing a contract until 2019.

In May 2018, 2. Bundesliga side Jahn Regensburg announced Volkmer would join for the 2018–19 season having agreed a contract until 2020. In January 2019, having made one short appearance for Regensburg in the first half of the season, he returned to the 3. Liga, joining Carl Zeiss Jena on loan until the end of the season.

After a short stay at Regensburg, he returned to Jena on 27 August 2019.

He moved to MSV Duisburg for the 2020–21 season. In the summer of 2022, he left Duisburg.

From October 2022 Volkmer trained with Regionalliga Nord club Atlas Delmenhorst, also playing in two friendly matches. He signed with the club on 31 January 2023.

== Career statistics ==
As of 25 October 2021

Appearances and goals by club, season and competition
Club	Season	League			Cup		Continental		Total	
Club	Season	Division	Apps	Goals	Apps	Goals	Apps	Goals	Apps	Goals
VfB Oldenburg	2014–15	Regionalliga	2	0	—		—		2	0
VfB Oldenburg	2015–16	Regionalliga	31	1	—		—		31	1
VfB Oldenburg	Total		33	1	—		—		33	1
Werder Bremen II	2016–17	3. Liga	28	1	—		—		28	1
Werder Bremen II	2017–18	3. Liga	34	0	—		—		34	0
Werder Bremen II	Total		62	1	—		—		62	1
Jahn Regensburg	2018–19	2. Bundesliga	1	0	—		—		1	0
Jahn Regensburg	2019–20	2. Bundesliga	1	0	1	0	—		2	0
Jahn Regensburg	Total		2	0	1	0	—		3	0
Carl Zeiss Jena (loan)	2018–19	3. Liga	17	0	—		—		17	0
Carl Zeiss Jena	2019–20	3. Liga	19	0	—		—		19	0
Carl Zeiss Jena	Total		36	0	—		—		36	0
MSV Duisburg	2020–21	3. Liga	11	0	1	0	—		12	0
MSV Duisburg	2021–22	3. Liga	3	0	—		—		3	0
MSV Duisburg	Total		14	0	1	0	—		15	0
Career total			147	2	2	0	—		149	2
