= Melvyn Lorenzen =

Ugandan footballer (born 1994)

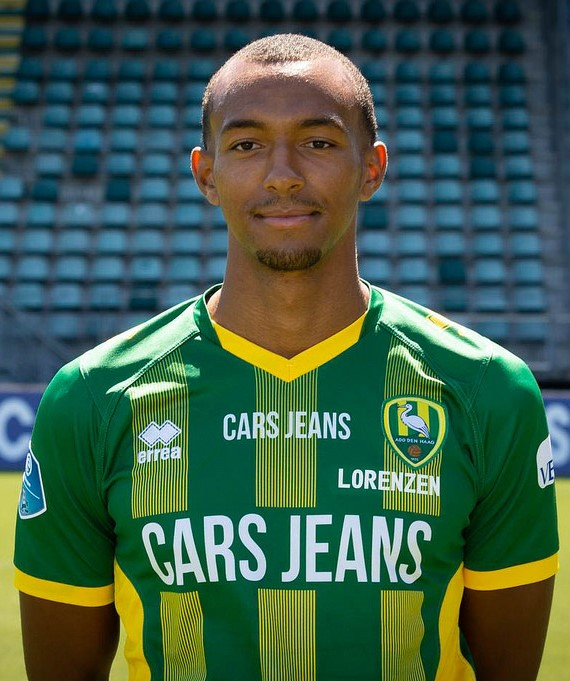
- Lorenzen with ADO Den Haag in 2018

Personal information
- Date of birth: 26 November 1994 (age 31)
- Place of birth: London, England
- Height: 1.88 m (6 ft 2 in)
- Position: Winger

Team information
- Current team: PSS Sleman
- Number: 77

Youth career
- 2001–2005: SpVgg Putlos
- 2005–2007: Oldenburger SV
- 2007–2013: Holstein Kiel

Senior career*
Years	Team	Apps	(Gls)
2013–2017	Werder Bremen II	54	(7)
2013–2017	Werder Bremen	14	(1)
2017–2019	ADO Den Haag	42	(3)
2019–2020	Karpaty Lviv	4	(0)
2021	Persela Lamongan	0	(0)
2021	Sligo Rovers	7	(0)
2022–2023	Wormatia Worms	17	(2)
2023–2024	Nakhon Ratchasima	34	(16)
2024–2025	BG Pathum United	13	(2)
2025	→ Muangthong United (loan)	13	(2)
2025–2026	Muangthong United	21	(5)
2026–	PSS Sleman	3	(1)

International career^{‡}
2016–	Uganda	4	(1)
- * Club domestic league appearances and goals as of 02:07, 8 October 2026 (UTC) ‡ National team caps and goals as of 23 December 2025

Melvyn Lorenzen (born 26 November 1994) is a professional footballer who plays as a winger for Super League club PSS Sleman. Born in England with German nationality, he plays for the Uganda national team.

== Club career ==
=== Werder Bremen ===
Lorenzen joined Werder Bremen in 2013 from Holstein Kiel. He made his Bundesliga debut on 5 October 2013 against VfB Stuttgart. He replaced Eljero Elia after 88 minutes in a 1–1 draw in Stuttgart.

On 13 December 2014, Lorenzen played his first Bundesliga match as part of the starting lineup and scored in a 3–3 draw against Hannover. On 28 January 2015, Lorenzen sustained an injury to the meniscus of his right knee and underwent surgery two days later.

Lorenzen had his first appearance of the 2015–16 season in Werder's 1–0 home defeat to Bayern Munich on 17 October 2015 before being substituted after 59 minutes.

He was released by Werder Bremen after playing for the reserves in the 2016–17 season. In his time at the club, he made a total of 14 Bundesliga appearances scoring one goal.

=== ADO Den Haag ===
In late July 2017, Lorenzen joined Eredivisie side ADO Den Haag on a two-year contract. He made his debut against FC Utrecht in a 3–0 loss at home.

=== Karpaty Lviv and Persela Lamongan ===
In March 2021, after trialling with AFC Wimbledon in September 2020, Lorenzen signed a one-month contract with Indonesian club Persela Lamongan of the Liga 1.

=== Sligo Rovers ===
On 23 August 2021, Lorenzen signed with League of Ireland Premier Division club Sligo Rovers for the remaining 13 games of their 2021 season, following two weeks of training with the club. He left the club at the end of the season.

=== Wormatia Worms ===
Free agent Lorenzen joined Wormatia Worms, newly promoted to the Regionalliga Südwest, in September 2022.

After a successful season with Nakhon Ratchasima helping them to win Thai League 2, Lorenzen joined Thai League 1 side BG Pathum United ahead of the new season.

== International career ==
Lorenzen was born in London, England to an Ugandan father and a German mother. His surname comes from his mother. His father is Drake Mugisa.

In 2016, Lorenzen was called up to the Uganda national team, and made his debut in a friendly 2–0 lost to Zimbabwe on 31 May 2016.

In November 2025, Lorenzen was called up by head coach Paul Put for a friendly match against Chad and Morocco where he scored his first international goal against Chad in a 2–1 win where its also his first match for Uganda since 2016. Lorenzen was than called up for the 2025 Africa Cup of Nations tournament in December where he make his tournament debut on 24 December 2025.

== Career statistics ==
As of 15 December 2021

Appearances and goals by club, season and competition
Club	Season	League			Cup		Other		Total	
Club	Season	League	Apps	Goals	Apps	Goals	Apps	Goals	Apps	Goals
Werder Bremen II	2013–14	Regionalliga Nord	13	4	—		—		13	4
Werder Bremen II	2014–15	Regionalliga Nord	2	0	—		1 (Note: Two appearances in the playoffs for promotion to the 3. Liga)	0	3	0
Werder Bremen II	2015–16	3. Liga	9	1	—		—		9	1
Werder Bremen II	2016–17	3. Liga	30	2	—		—		30	2
Werder Bremen II	Total		54	7	0	0	1	0	55	7
Werder Bremen	2013–14	Bundesliga	2	0	0	0	—		2	0
Werder Bremen	2014–15	Bundesliga	3	1	0	0	—		3	1
Werder Bremen	2015–16	Bundesliga	9	0	0	0	—		9	0
Werder Bremen	Total		14	1	0	0	0	0	14	1
ADO Den Haag	2017–18	Eredivisie	20	1	1	0	1 (Note: Appearance in the Eredivisie Europa League playoffs)	0	22	1
ADO Den Haag	2018–19	Eredivisie	22	2	1	0	0	0	23	2
ADO Den Haag	Total		42	3	2	0	1	0	45	3
Karpaty Lviv	2019–20	Ukrainian Premier League	4	0	0	0	—		4	0
Persela Lamongan	2021	Liga 1	—		—		3 (Note: Appearance in the Menpora Cup)	2	3	2
Sligo Rovers	2021	League of Ireland Premier Division	7	0	—		—		7	0
Career total			121	11	2	0	5	2	128	13
