= Torben Rehfeldt =

German footballer (born 1993)

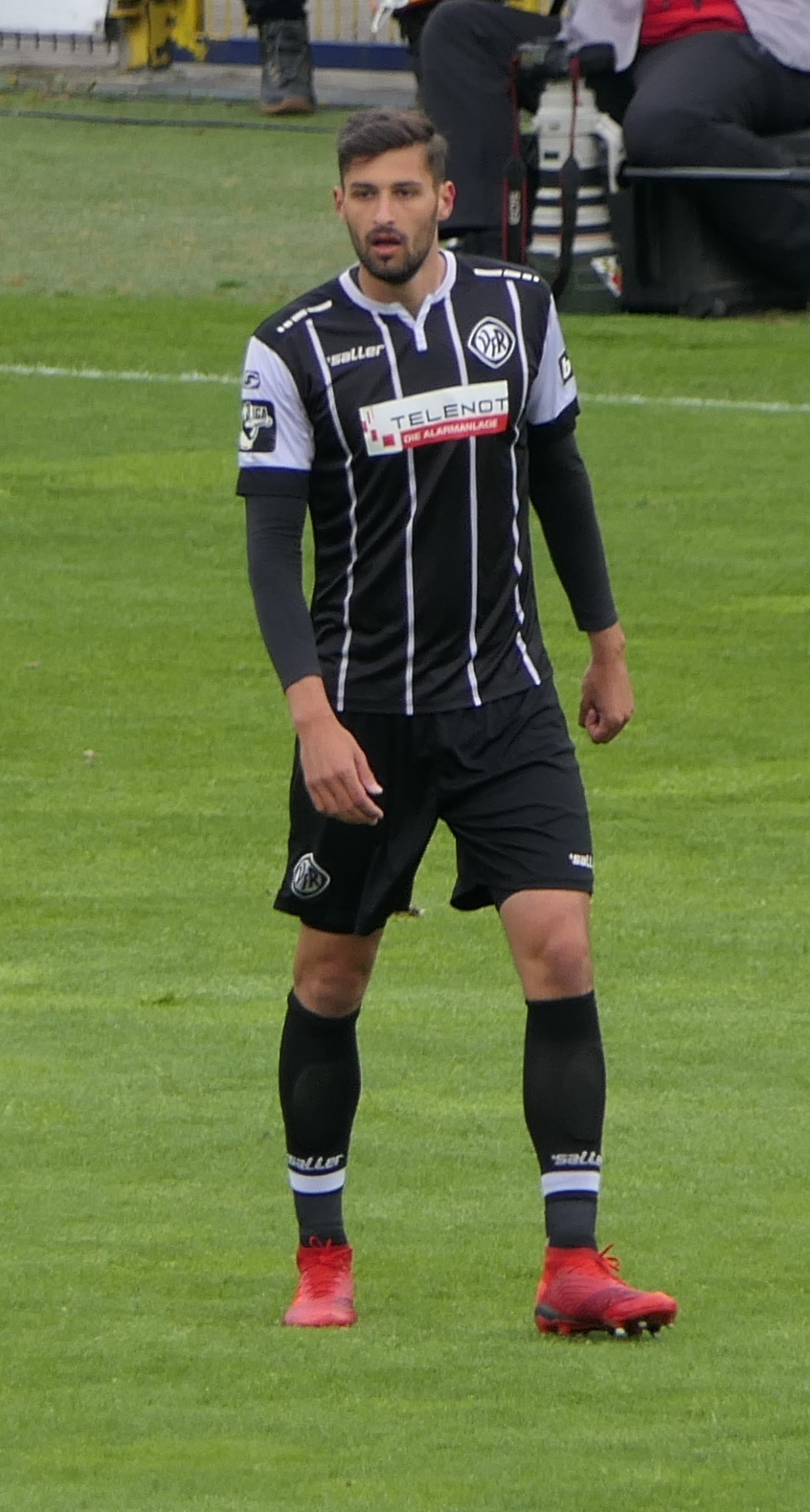
- Rehfeldt in 2019

Personal information
- Date of birth: 7 August 1993 (age 33)
- Place of birth: Kisdorf, Germany
- Height: 1.93 m (6 ft 4 in)
- Position: Centre-back

Team information
- Current team: Blau-Weiß Lohne
- Number: 33

Youth career
- –2009: SV Henstedt-Ulzburg
- 2009–2011: Holstein Kiel
- 2011–2012: Werder Bremen

Senior career*
Years	Team	Apps	(Gls)
2010–2011	Holstein Kiel	1	(0)
2012–2017	Werder Bremen II	115	(5)
2013	Werder Bremen	0	(0)
2017–2019	VfR Aalen	71	(2)
2019–2021	SV Elversberg	51	(4)
2021–2025	Weiche Flensburg	100	(6)
2025–	Blau-Weiß Lohne	14	(0)
- * Club domestic league appearances and goals as of 20 June 2026

Torben Rehfeldt (born 7 August 1993) is a German professional footballer who plays as centre-back for Regionalliga Nord club Blau-Weiß Lohne.

== Career ==
After joining Werder Bremen in July 2012, Rehfeldt initially played for the club's U-21 team. In the 2014–15 season he was promoted to the reserves playing in the 3. Liga.

In May 2017, he signed a two-year contract with 3. Liga rivals VfR Aalen.

Having left SV Elversberg upon the expiration of his contract after the 2020–21 season, Rehfeldt moved to Regionalliga Nord club SC Weiche Flensburg 08 in July 2021. He signed a two-year contract.
