= Johannes Eggestein =

German footballer (born 1998)

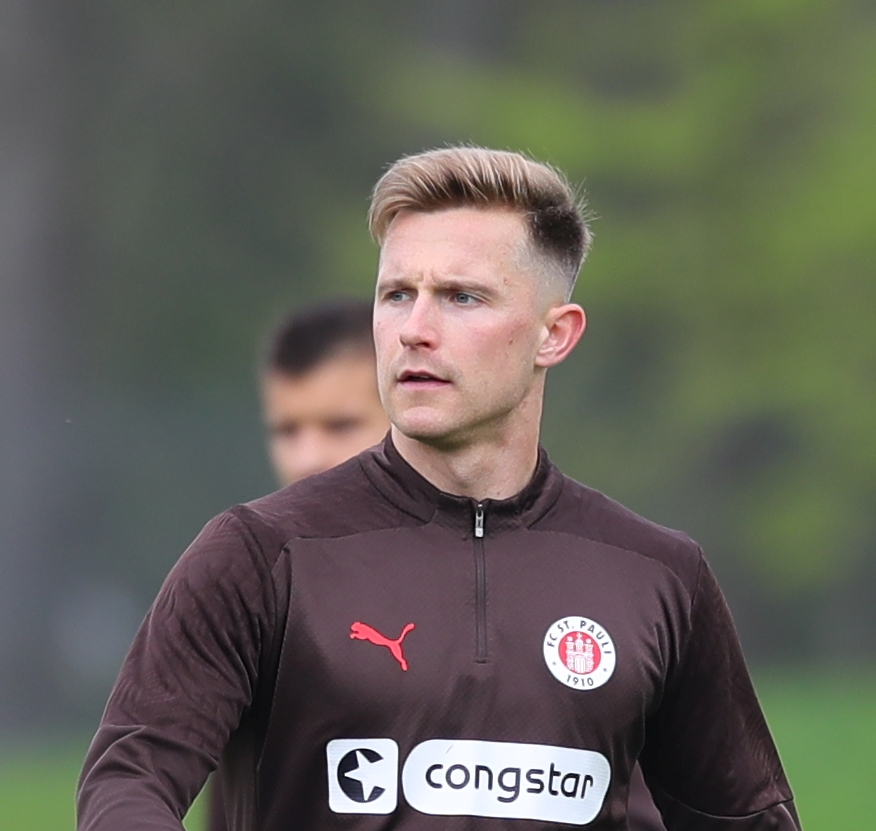
- Eggestein in 2025

Personal information
- Date of birth: 8 May 1998 (age 28)
- Place of birth: Hanover, Germany
- Height: 1.83 m (6 ft 0 in)
- Position: Striker

Team information
- Current team: Austria Wien
- Number: 19

Youth career
- TSV Schloß Ricklingen
- –2013: TSV Havelse
- 2013–2016: Werder Bremen

Senior career*
Years	Team	Apps	(Gls)
2016–2018	Werder Bremen II	31	(3)
2016–2021	Werder Bremen	47	(5)
2020–2021	→ LASK (loan)	28	(12)
2021–2022	Antwerp	18	(0)
2022–2025	FC St. Pauli	77	(17)
2025–	Austria Wien	29	(9)

International career^{‡}
2012–2013	Germany U15	7	(4)
2013–2014	Germany U16	9	(9)
2014–2015	Germany U17	18	(10)
2016–2017	Germany U19	5	(1)
2017–2018	Germany U20	6	(2)
2017–2019	Germany U21	11	(2)
Medal record
Men's football
Representing Germany
UEFA European Under-21 Championship
Runner-up	2019 Italy
UEFA European Under-17 Championship
Runner-up	2015 Bulgaria
- * Club domestic league appearances and goals as of 10 June 2026 ‡ National team caps and goals as of 17 November 2019

Johannes Eggestein (German pronunciation: [joˈhanəs ˈʔɛɡəʃtaɪn]; born 8 May 1998) is a German professional footballer who plays as striker for Austrian club Austria Wien. He has represented Germany internationally at youth levels U15 through U21.

== Career ==
=== Youth career ===
Eggestein started his youth career at TSV Schloß Ricklingen and played there until 2013 when he moved to TSV Havelse.

Since 2013, Eggestein has played for Werder Bremen. In all three years he played for Bremen's youth team he finished as top scorer among the players.

=== Werder Bremen ===
On 2 June 2016, Eggestein signed his first professional contract, which lasts until 2019.

On 22 August 2016, he made his professional and first-team debut in Werder Bremen's first-round DFB-Pokal defeat to Sportfreunde Lotte being substituted on in place of Lennart Thy in the 62nd minute. Four days later, he scored his first professional goal in the reserves' 4–2 win against VfL Osnabrück in the 3. Liga.

On 18 August 2018, Eggestein scored his first goal for the first team, in a 6–1 win against Wormatia Worms in the first round of the DFB-Pokal. On 8 April 2019, Werder Bremen announced the extension of his contract.

On 5 October 2020, the last day of the 2020 summer transfer window, Eggestein moved to Austrian Bundesliga club LASK on loan for the 2020–21 season.

=== Antwerp ===
Eggestein moved to Belgian First Division A club Antwerp on 5 August 2021.

=== St. Pauli ===
On 21 June 2022, Eggestein returned to Germany and signed for 2. Bundesliga club FC St. Pauli.

=== Austria Wien ===
On 23 July 2025, Eggestein joined Austria Wien on a three-year contract.

== Personal life ==
Eggestein is the son of former footballer Karl Eggestein who played for TSV Havelse among other clubs in the 2. Bundesliga. His brother Maximilian Eggestein plays for SC Freiburg.

== Career statistics ==
=== Club ===
As of match played 17 May 2025

Appearances and goals by club, season and competition
Club	Season	League			National cup (Note: Includes DFB-Pokal, Austrian Cup, Belgian Cup)		Continental		Total	
Club	Season	Division	Apps	Goals	Apps	Goals	Apps	Goals	Apps	Goals
Werder Bremen	2016–17	Bundesliga	0	0	1	0	–		1	0
Werder Bremen	2017–18	Bundesliga	7	0	1	0	–		8	0
Werder Bremen	2018–19	Bundesliga	23	4	5	1	–		28	5
Werder Bremen	2019–20	Bundesliga	14	1	1	0	–		15	1
Werder Bremen	2020–21	Bundesliga	2	0	1	0	–		3	0
Werder Bremen	2021–22	2. Bundesliga	1	0	0	0	–		1	0
Werder Bremen	Total		47	5	9	1	–		56	6
Werder Bremen II	2016–17	3. Liga	15	3	–		–		15	3
Werder Bremen II	2017–18	3. Liga	16	0	–		–		16	0
Werder Bremen II	Total		31	3	–		–		31	3
LASK (loan)	2020–21	Austrian Bundesliga	28	12	5	6	6 (Note: Appearances in UEFA Europa League)	2	39	20
Royal Antwerp	2021–22	Belgian First Division A	18	0	1	0	6	0	25	0
FC St. Pauli	2022–23	2. Bundesliga	21	5	2	0	–		23	5
FC St. Pauli	2023–24	2. Bundesliga	29	9	4	2	–		33	11
FC St. Pauli	2024–25	Bundesliga	27	3	2	1	–		29	4
FC St. Pauli	Total		77	17	8	3	–		85	20
Career total			201	37	23	10	12	2	236	49

== Honours ==
FC St. Pauli

- 2. Bundesliga: 2023–24
