= Tobias Duffner =

German footballer (born 1983)

Personal information
- Date of birth: 5 December 1983 (age 42)
- Place of birth: Brinkum, West Germany
- Height: 1.87 m (6 ft 2 in)
- Position: Goalkeeper

Team information
- Current team: Bremer SV
- Number: 22

Youth career
- TS Woltermershausen
- VfB Oldenburg
- Werder Bremen
- TSV Meyenburg

Senior career*
| Years | Team | Apps | (Gls) |
| 2003–2004 | SC Weyhe | 28 | (0) |
| 2004–2005 | Holstein Kiel II | 4 | (0) |
| 2005–2006 | Brinkumer SV | 16 | (0) |
| 2006–2007 | VfR Neumünster | 34 | (0) |
| 2007–2008 | TuRU Düsseldorf | 13 | (0) |
| 2008–2009 | Kickers Emden | 1 | (0) |
| 2010 | SV Ahlerstedt/Ottendorf | 12 | (0) |
| 2010–2019 | Werder Bremen II | 49 | (0) |
| 2024– | Bremer SV | 14 | (0) |
| Total | | 159 | (0) |

Managerial career
- 2013–2014: Werder Bremen U17 (assistant)
- 2020–2023: SV Atlas (goalkeeping coach)
- * Club domestic league appearances and goals as of 22 September 2026

Tobias Duffner (born 5 December 1983) is a German professional footballer who plays as a goalkeeper for Bremer SV. Tobias Duffner at Soccerway

== Career ==
Duffner made his professional debut for Kickers Emden on 31 March 2009 in the 3. Liga against SpVgg Unterhaching.

He was retired, but in January 2024, he signed a contract with Bremer SV.
