= Miloš Veljković =

Serbian footballer (born 1995)

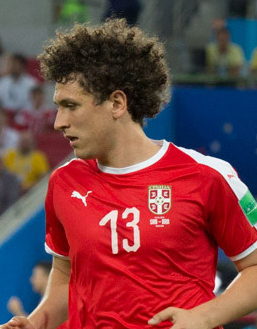
- Veljković with Serbia at the 2018 FIFA World Cup

Personal information
- Full name: Miloš Veljković
- Date of birth: 26 September 1995 (age 31)
- Place of birth: Basel, Switzerland
- Height: 1.88 m (6 ft 2 in)
- Position: Centre-back

Team information
- Current team: Red Star Belgrade
- Number: 13

Youth career
- 2000–2011: Basel
- 2011–2015: Tottenham Hotspur

Senior career*
Years	Team	Apps	(Gls)
2013–2016	Tottenham Hotspur	2	(0)
2014–2015	→ Middlesbrough (loan)	3	(0)
2015	→ Charlton Athletic (loan)	3	(0)
2016	Werder Bremen II	8	(0)
2016–2025	Werder Bremen	221	(6)
2025–	Red Star Belgrade	24	(3)

International career^{‡}
2011	Switzerland U16	1	(0)
2012	Serbia U17	3	(1)
2013–2014	Serbia U19	10	(1)
2015	Serbia U20	8	(1)
2014–2017	Serbia U21	14	(0)
2017–	Serbia	39	(1)
Medal record
Men's Football
Representing Serbia
FIFA U-20 World Cup
Gold medal – first place	2015 New Zealand	U-20 Team
UEFA U-19 Championship
Gold medal – first place	2013 Lithuania
- * Club domestic league appearances and goals as of 21 November 2026 ‡ National team caps and goals as of 14 October 2025

Miloš Veljković (Serbian Cyrillic: Милош Вељковић, pronounced [mǐloʃ ʋěːʎkoʋitɕ]; born 26 September 1995) is a professional footballer who plays as a centre-back for Serbian SuperLiga club Red Star Belgrade. Born in Switzerland, he represents the Serbia national team.

== Club career ==
=== Early career ===
Born in Basel in Switzerland to Serbian parents, Veljković started his professional footballing career at Swiss side FC Basel.

=== Tottenham Hotspur ===
Miloš Veljković joined Tottenham Hotspur in 2011 from FC Basel. He made his Premier League debut on 8 April 2014 against Sunderland in a 5–1 home win, replacing Paulinho after 88 minutes. He got a longer run out on 11 May against Aston Villa when he came on for Sandro in the 62nd minute.

Veljković went on loan to Middlesbrough in the Championship on 16 October 2014 for three months. Due to the form of the midfield duo of Grant Leadbitter and Adam Clayton in central midfield, he was limited to a few substitute appearances and his loan was not extended in January.

On 20 January 2015, Veljković joined Charlton Athletic on loan until the end of the season. However, he picked a shoulder injury in his third match for Charlton which ruled him out of contention.

=== Werder Bremen ===
Veljković joined Werder Bremen on 1 February 2016, signing a three-and-a-half-year deal, for a reported fee of €300,000. On 24 September 2016, he made his first appearance for the first team of the 2016–17 season in a 2–1 victory against VfL Wolfsburg on matchday 5, the club's first win of the season; he played the full 90 minutes as centre-back after Lamine Sané had dropped out with knee problems in the warmup to the match.

He agreed a contract extension with the club in June 2018.

In June 2022, after Werder Bremen's return to the Bundesliga in the 2021–22 season, Veljković signed another contract extension with the club, reportedly until 2025.

=== Red Star Belgrade ===
On 11 March 2025, Red Star Belgrade announced that had reached an agreement with Veljković on a three-year deal. Veljković's contract with Werder expired in the summer, which the Serbian club used to acquire him as the first summer reinforcement. He scored his first goal for Red Star Belgrade on 4 December 2025 during the 3–0 victory against Čukarički.

== International career ==
Veljković was born in Switzerland to Serbian parents, he initially represented Switzerland U16's before pledging his allegiance to Serbia. He played for the Serbia U19 team which won the 2013 UEFA European Under-19 Championship. In the summer of 2015, he also won the FIFA U-20 World Cup for Serbia U20's as part of a Golden Generation coming through for the Serbia national team. Veljković played every game as centre back.

He made his debut for the Serbia national team on 11 November 2017 in a friendly match against China.

In June 2018, he was included in the final 23-man squad for the 2018 FIFA World Cup, where he appeared in the match against Brazil.

In November 2022, he was selected in Serbia's squad for the 2022 FIFA World Cup in Qatar. He played in all three group stage matches, against Brazil, Cameroon, and Switzerland. Serbia finished fourth in the group.

Veljković was part of the Serbia squad for UEFA Euro 2024 and started the team's opening match of the tournament against England, playing the full 90 minutes in the 1–0 loss.

== Style of play ==
Veljković has played both as centre back and as a defensive midfielder. He revealed that he prefers to play as a defensive midfielder in club football, and prefers to play as a centre back during international football.

== Career statistics ==
=== Club ===
As of match played 20 September 2026

Appearances and goals by club, season and competition
Club	Season	League			National cup (Note: Includes FA Cup, DFB-Pokal)		Europe		Other		Total	
Club	Season	Division	Apps	Goals	Apps	Goals	Apps	Goals	Apps	Goals	Apps	Goals
Tottenham Hotspur	2013–14	Premier League	2	0	0	0	0	0	0	0	2	0
Tottenham Hotspur	2014–15	Premier League	0	0	0	0	1	0	0	0	1	0
Tottenham Hotspur	Total		2	0	0	0	1	0	0	0	3	0
Middlesbrough (loan)	2014–15	Championship	3	0	1	0	–		0	0	4	0
Charlton Athletic (loan)	2014–15	Championship	3	0	0	0	–		0	0	3	0
Werder Bremen II	2015–16	3. Liga	5	0	–		–		–		5	0
Werder Bremen II	2016–17	3. Liga	3	0	–		–		–		3	0
Werder Bremen II	Total		8	0	–		–		–		8	0
Werder Bremen	2015–16	Bundesliga	3	0	1	0	–		–		4	0
Werder Bremen	2016–17	Bundesliga	26	0	0	0	–		–		26	0
Werder Bremen	2017–18	Bundesliga	30	1	4	1	–		–		34	2
Werder Bremen	2018–19	Bundesliga	23	1	3	0	–		–		26	1
Werder Bremen	2019–20	Bundesliga	24	0	2	0	–		2 (Note: Appearances in Bundesliga relegation play-offs)	0	28	0
Werder Bremen	2020–21	Bundesliga	23	0	3	0	–		–		26	0
Werder Bremen	2021–22	2. Bundesliga	26	1	0	0	–		–		26	1
Werder Bremen	2022–23	Bundesliga	29	1	2	0	–		–		31	1
Werder Bremen	2023–24	Bundesliga	23	2	0	0	–		–		23	2
Werder Bremen	2024–25	Bundesliga	14	0	3	0	–		–		17	0
Werder Bremen	Total		221	6	18	1	–		2	0	242	7
Red Star Belgrade	2025–26	Serbian SuperLiga	16	2	5	0	15 (Note: Six appearances in UEFA Champions League, nine appearances in UEFA Europa League)	0	–		36	2
Red Star Belgrade	2026–27	Serbian SuperLiga	7	1	0	0	4 (Note: Two appearances in UEFA Champions League, two appearances in UEFA Europa League)	0	–		11	1
Red Star Belgrade	Total		23	3	5	0	19	0	–		47	3
Career total			260	9	24	1	20	0	2	0	306	10

=== International ===
As of 14 October 2025

Appearances and goals by national team and year
National team	Year	Apps	Goals
Serbia	2017	2	0
Serbia	2018	7	0
Serbia	2019	0	0
Serbia	2020	0	0
Serbia	2021	6	0
Serbia	2022	9	0
Serbia	2023	5	1
Serbia	2024	6	0
Serbia	2025	4	0
Total		39	1

Scores and results list Serbia's goal tally first, score column indicates score after each Veljković goal.

List of international goals scored by Miloš Veljković
No.	Date	Venue	Cap	Opponent	Score	Result	Competition
1	19 November 2023	Dubočica Stadium, Leskovac, Serbia	29	Bulgaria	1–0	2–2	UEFA Euro 2024 qualifying

== Honours ==
Red Star

- Serbian SuperLiga: 2025–26
- Serbian Cup: 2025–26

Serbia U19

- UEFA Under-19 Championship: 2013

Serbia U20

- FIFA U-20 World Cup: 2015

Individual

- UEFA European Under-19 Championship Team of the Tournament: 2013
