= Weserstadion Platz 11 =

Football stadium in Bremen, Germany

- Platz 11
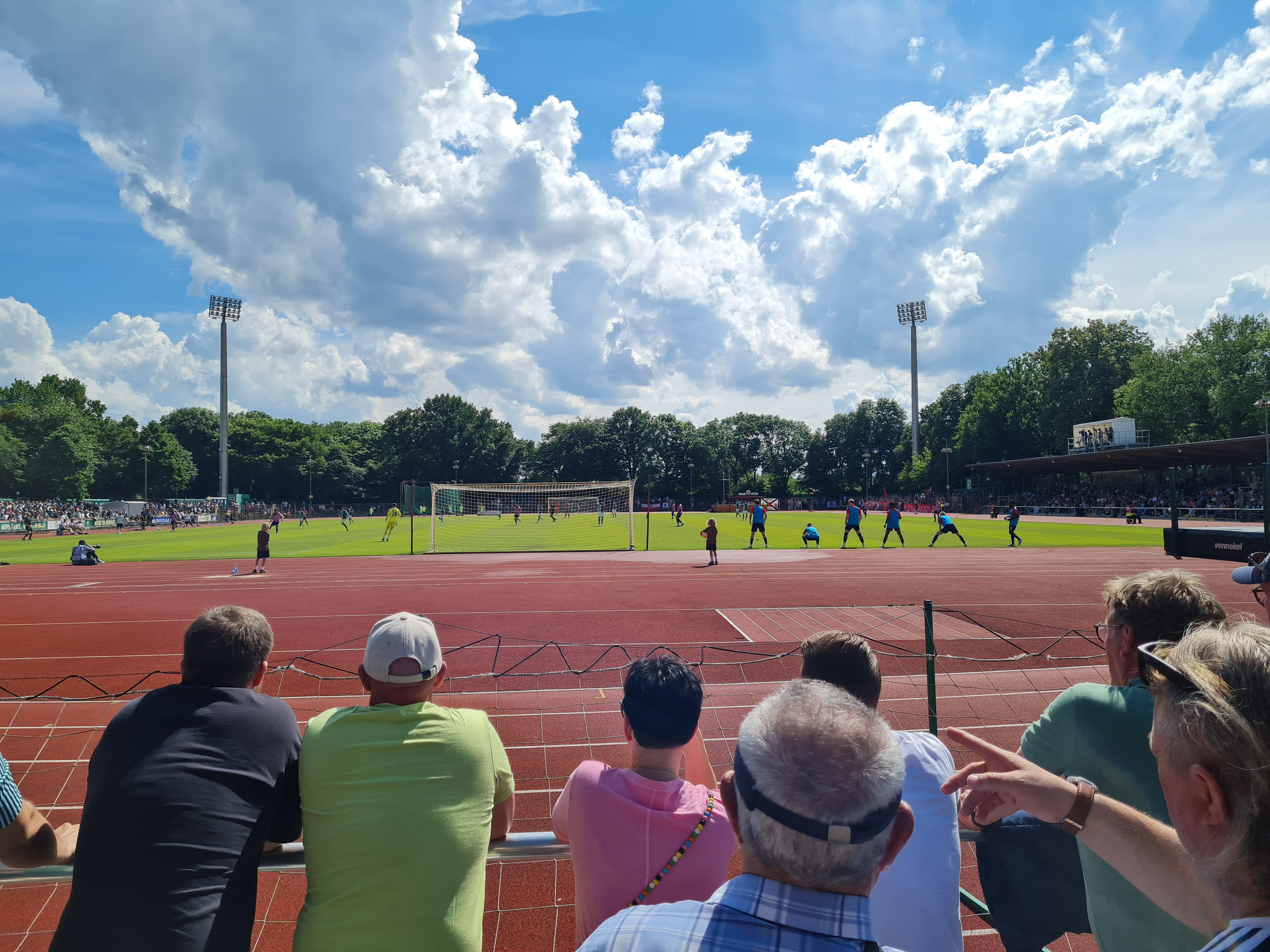
- Interactive map of Weserstadion Platz 11
- Location: Bremen, Germany
- Coordinates: 53°3′49.59″N 8°50′34.73″E
- Capacity: 5,500
- Surface: Grass

Construction
- Renovated: 2008

Tenants
- SV Werder Bremen II; SV Werder Bremen (women)

Weserstadion Platz 11 is a football stadium in Bremen, Germany. The stadium is mainly used by SV Werder Bremen (women), playing in the Frauen-Bundesliga, and by SV Werder Bremen II, the reserve team of Werder Bremen, which is playing in the 3. Liga in the season 2017–18.

The stadium consists mainly of terraces with room for 4,500 spectators. A small stand with 1,000 seats for both home and visiting supporters is located on the west side of the stadium and brings the total capacity to 5,500 spectators.

== Facilities ==
The stadium complex features a grass field as well as a race track and other track and field facilities.
