= Abdullah Doğan =

Footballer (born 1997)

Personal information
- Date of birth: 10 February 1997 (age 29)
- Place of birth: Bremen, Germany
- Height: 1.77 m (5 ft 10 in)
- Positions: Right winger; attacking midfielder

Team information
- Current team: OSC Bremerhaven

Youth career
- SGO Bremen
- –2012: TuS Komet Arsten
- 2012–2017: Werder Bremen

Senior career*
Years	Team	Apps	(Gls)
2016–2017	Werder Bremen II	3	(0)
2017–2018	BSV Schwarz-Weiß Rehden	15	(0)
2019	FC Oberneuland	7	(1)
2019	SSV Jeddeloh II	0	(0)
2020–2022	TB Uphusen	26	(2)
2022–2023	Vatan Sport Bremen	12	(3)
2023	Tuzlaspor	0	(0)
2023	→ Diyarbekirspor (loan)	3	(0)
2023–2024	Vatan Sport Bremen	16	(6)
2024–	OSC Bremerhaven	11	(1)

International career
2013	Turkey U17	5	(0)
2014	Turkey U18	1	(0)
- * Club domestic league appearances and goals as of 3 May 2024

Abdullah Doğan (born 10 February 1997) is a footballer who plays as a right winger or attacking midfielder for Bremen-Liga club OSC Bremerhaven. Born in Germany, he represented Turkey internationally at youth levels U17 and U18.

== Career ==
After playing for SGO Bremen and TuS Komet Arsten, Doğan moved to the youth team of Werder Bremen. After being selected by the coach of the reserve team, Alexander Nouri, to join the squad, he made his 3. Liga debut on 12 March 2016 in a 1–0 loss against Rot-Weiß Erfurt coming as a substitute for Enis Bytyqi in the 67th minute.
