= Mohamed Aidara (footballer, born 1989) =

Senegalese footballer

Personal information
- Date of birth: 24 December 1989 (age 36)
- Place of birth: Dakar, Senegal
- Height: 1.71 m (5 ft 7 in)
- Position: Midfielder

Team information
- Current team: Heidelberg United
- Number: 3

Youth career
- FC St. Pauli
- Jenfelder SV
- SC Concordia
- –2008: Paris FC

Senior career*
Years	Team	Apps	(Gls)
2008–2009	Niendorfer TSV	25	(3)
2009–2010	USC Paloma	10	(1)
2010	FSV Frankfurt II		
2010	Germania Ober-Roden		
2011–2012	Lüneburger SK Hansa		
2012–2015	VfB Oldenburg	88	(2)
2015–2017	Werder Bremen II	36	(1)
2017–2018	Mouscron	11	(0)
2019	Næstved BK	0	(0)
2021–2022	Altona Magic	31	(7)
2023–	Heidelberg United	57	(2)
- * Club domestic league appearances and goals as of 18 September 2025

Mohamed Aidara (born 24 December 1989) is a Senegalese professional footballer who plays as a midfielder for Heidelberg United in NPL Victoria.

== Career ==
Before signing a contract with VfB Oldenburg, he played for Lüneburger SK Hansa and FSV Frankfurt II. However, due to a compensation issue with his previous club USC Paloma, he did not play a competitive game for FSV Frankfurt II.

Aidara played three seasons with VfB Oldenburg in the Regionalliga Nord between 2012 and 2015, making 87 appearances and scoring three goals. In June 2015, he signed a two-year deal with Werder Bremen II of the 3. Liga.

He was released by Werder Bremen at the end of the 2016–17 season.

On 22 October 2019, Aidara joined Danish 1st Division club Næstved BK.

== Personal life ==
He is the younger brother of Kassim Aidara, who is a Senegalese-French former professional footballer.
