= Ousman Manneh =

Gambian footballer

Personal information
- Date of birth: 10 March 1997 (age 29)
- Place of birth: Ginak Kajata, Gambia
- Height: 1.89 m (6 ft 2 in)
- Position: Striker

Youth career
- 2004–2014: Rush Soccer Academy
- 2014–2015: Blumenthaler SV
- 2015–: Werder Bremen

Senior career*
Years	Team	Apps	(Gls)
2015–2020	Werder Bremen II	69	(12)
2016–2020	Werder Bremen	6	(1)
- * Club domestic league appearances and goals as of 12:25, 15 September 2020 (UTC)

Ousman Manneh (born 10 March 1997) is a Gambian professional footballer who last played as a striker for SV Werder Bremen II.

== Club career ==
=== Early career ===
In 2004 Manneh started training at the Rush Soccer Academy, a United States soccer franchise for children and youth in Bakau.

At the age of 17 he fled the dictatorship in his home country Gambia reaching Bremen and living in the refugee camp of Lesum. Following a trial he joined the Blumenthaler SV U-18 team before playing for the U-19 side in the youth regional league, the second-tier youth league in Germany, where he scored 15 goals in 11 matches. These performances earned him trials with FC St. Pauli, Hamburg, Schalke 04 and Wolfsburg.

=== Werder Bremen ===
Having chosen to stay in Bremen and play for Werder Bremen, Manneh initially played for the club's youth team. On 10 March 2015, he signed a three-year contract with the club running until summer 2018.

On 25 July 2015, he made his 3. Liga debut for the reserves against Hansa Rostock scoring the winning goal in a 1–2 away win. Four days later, he made his first appearance for the first team; having entered the pitch after 60 minutes he scored four goals in 15 minutes in a 7–0 friendly match win against SV Wilhelmshaven.

After scoring and assisting two goals each in his first seven appearances for the reserves in the 2016–17 season, Manneh made his full Bundesliga debut on 21 September 2016 in a 1–2 home defeat to Mainz 05 before being replaced by Lennart Thy in the 55th minute. He also started in the following match three days later, a 2–1 win against VfL Wolfsburg, Werder Bremen's first victory of the season, being substituted off after 73 minutes.

Manneh scored his first Bundesliga goal on 15 October, in Werder Bremen's 2–1 win against Bayer Leverkusen.

He made his return from a 21-month injury layoff 8 December 2019, coming on as a substitute for Werder Bremen II.

Manneh was released by Werder Bremen when his contract expired in summer 2020.

== Career statistics ==
=== Club ===
As of 15 September 2020

Appearances and goals by club, season and competition
Club	Season	League			Cup (Note: Includes Czech Cup, DFB-Pokal)		Europe		Total	
Club	Season	Division	Apps	Goals	Apps	Goals	Apps	Goals	Apps	Goals
Werder Bremen II	2014–15	Regionalliga Nord	3	0	—		—		3	0
Werder Bremen II	2015–16	3. Liga	28	3	—		—		28	3
Werder Bremen II	2016–17	3. Liga	20	4	—		—		20	4
Werder Bremen II	2017–18	3. Liga	17	5	—		—		17	5
Werder Bremen II	2019–20	Regionalliga Nord	1	0	—		—		1	0
Werder Bremen II	Total		69	12	0	0	0	0	69	12
Werder Bremen	2016–17	Bundesliga	6	1	—		—		6	1
Career total			75	13	0	0	0	0	75	13
