= Ole Käuper =

German footballer (born 1997)

Personal information
- Date of birth: 9 January 1997 (age 29)
- Place of birth: Bremen, Germany
- Height: 1.87 m (6 ft 2 in)
- Position: Midfielder

Team information
- Current team: TSV Steinbach Haiger
- Number: 28

Youth career
- –2005: ATSV Sebaldsbrück
- 2005–2015: Werder Bremen

Senior career*
Years	Team	Apps	(Gls)
2015–2018	Werder Bremen II	60	(4)
2017–2021	Werder Bremen	1	(0)
2019	→ Erzgebirge Aue (loan)	4	(0)
2019–2020	→ Carl Zeiss Jena (loan)	22	(3)
2021	→ Nitra (loan)	7	(0)
2021–2023	SV Meppen	49	(2)
2023–2024	VfB Oldenburg	23	(2)
2024–	TSV Steinbach Haiger	53	(15)

International career
2013	Germany U16	4	(1)
2013–2014	Germany U17	8	(3)
2014	Germany U20	1	(0)
- * Club domestic league appearances and goals as of 24 September 2026

Ole Käuper (born 9 January 1997) is a German professional footballer who plays as a midfielder for TSV Steinbach Haiger.

== Career ==
Born in Bremen, Ole Käuper was with ATSV Sebaldsbrück before joining Werder Bremen on 1 July 2005.

On 24 October 2015, Käuper made his debut for Werder Bremen II in a 4–0 win over Erzgebirge Aue.

In September 2017, he was handed his first professional contract by Werder Bremen. He was first called up to the first-team squad for the club's Bundesliga match away to Bayer Leverkusen on 13 December and made his debut, playing the first 73 minutes.

On 6 January 2019, Käuper joined 2. Bundesliga club Erzgebirge Aue on a 1.5-year loan until the end of 2019–20 season. In April he was suspended for "disciplinary reasons". On 17 June 2019, the loan was cut short.

One day after being released from his Aue contract, Käuper agreed to a season-long loan move to 3. Liga side Carl Zeiss Jena.

He joined Slovak First Football League club FC Nitra on loan until the end of the season in January 2021.

In June 2021, Käuper agreed the termination of his contract with Werder Bremen and joined SV Meppen of the 3. Liga. He signed a two-year contract with Meppen.

On 27 June 2023, VfB Oldenburg announced that they had signed Käuper.
