= Florian Kohfeldt =

German football manager

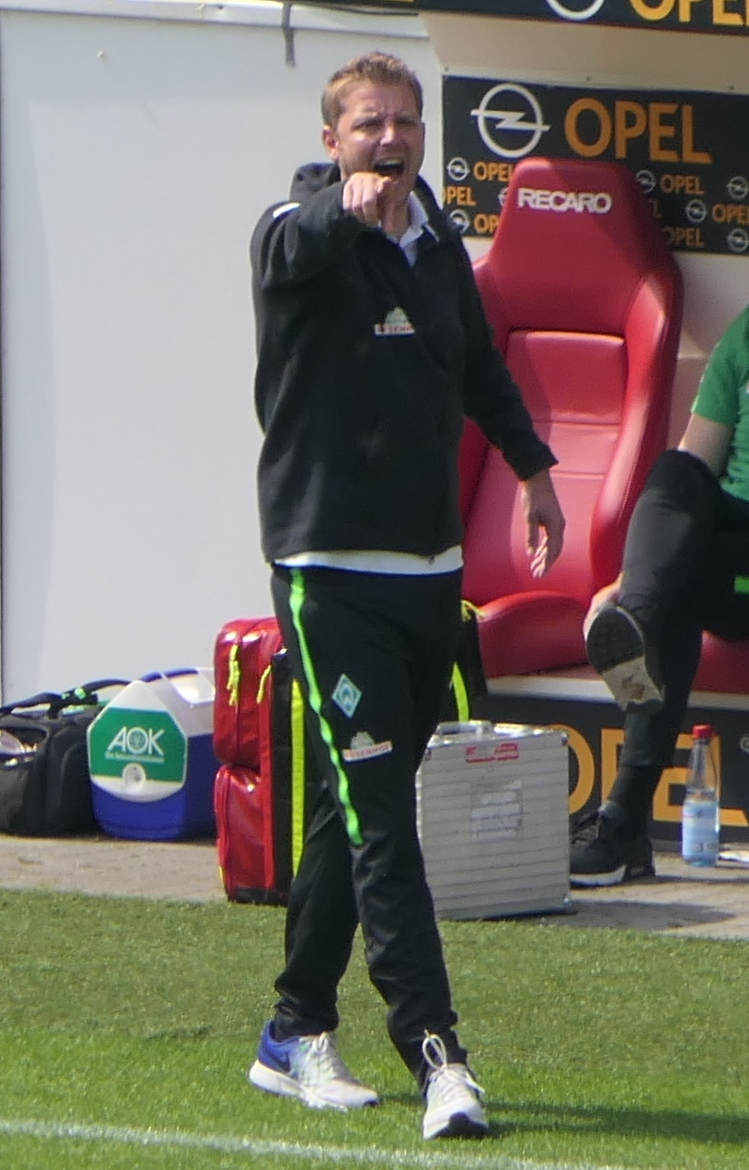
- Kohfeldt with Werder Bremen in 2018

Personal information
- Date of birth: 5 October 1982 (age 44)
- Place of birth: Siegen, West Germany
- Position: Goalkeeper

Team information
- Current team: Darmstadt 98 (manager)

Youth career
- TV Jahn Delmenhorst

Senior career*
Years	Team	Apps	(Gls)
2001–2009	Werder Bremen U21		

Managerial career
- 2016–2017: Werder Bremen II
- 2017–2021: Werder Bremen
- 2021–2022: VfL Wolfsburg
- 2023–2024: Eupen
- 2024–: Darmstadt 98
- * Club domestic league appearances and goals

Florian Kohfeldt (born 5 October 1982) is a German football manager for Darmstadt 98. He previously managed Werder Bremen, VfL Wolfsburg, and K.A.S. Eupen.

== Managerial career ==
From 2006, Kohfeldt coached various youth teams of Werder Bremen. From the 2014–15 season, Kohfeldt worked as assistant manager of Bremen, under head coach Viktor Skrypnyk. On 2 October 2016, it was announced that Kohfeldt would become head coach of Werder Bremen II, effective as of the following day.

Kohfeldt was appointed interim manager of Werder Bremen on 30 October 2017 following Alexander Nouri's dismissal. He finished with a record of 12 wins, 14 draws, and 16 losses in 42 matches with the reserve team. In November he became the permanent manager of Werder Bremen. In April 2018, he agreed a contract extension with the club until summer 2021.

In July 2019, he agreed a two-year contract extension with the club until 2023. He was sacked on 16 May 2021.

On 26 October 2021, Kohfeldt was appointed manager of VfL Wolfsburg, signing a two-year contract. He was relieved of his duties on 15 May 2022.

From 2023 to 2024, he coached Belgian club K.A.S. Eupen.

In September 2024, he was signed by 2. Bundesliga club Darmstadt 98.

== Personal life ==
Kohfeldt has a Master of Arts in public health, and a football instructor license of the DFB.

== Managerial record ==
As of match played on 20 November 2026

Team	From	To	Record								
Team	From	To	M	W	D	L	GF	GA	GD	Win %	Ref.
Werder Bremen II	2 October 2016	29 October 2017	42	12	14	16	36	48	−12	28.57	
Werder Bremen	30 October 2017	16 May 2021	143	50	38	55	215	223	−8	34.97	
VfL Wolfsburg	26 October 2021	15 May 2022	28	9	5	14	37	48	−11	32.14	
Eupen	1 July 2023	16 March 2024	31	7	3	21	24	60	−36	22.58	
Darmstadt 98	7 September 2024	Present	83	32	24	27	136	119	+17	38.55	
Total			327	110	84	133	448	498	−50	33.64	—
