= 2012–13 Stuttgarter Kickers season =

Stuttgarter Kickers
2012–13 season
- Chairman: Rainer Lorz
- Manager: Dirk Schuster (until Nov.); Guido Buchwald (Nov. – Dez.); Gerd Dais (Dez. – Apr.); Massimo Morales (Apr. – Jun.)
- Stadium: Gazi-Stadion auf der Waldau, Stuttgart, BW
- 3. Liga: 17th
- Württemberg Cup: quarterfinal
- Top goalscorer: League: Marco Grüttner (18); All: Marco Grüttner (20)
- Highest home attendance: 6,420 vs. Karlsruher SC, 24 October 2012
- Lowest home attendance: 3,100 vs. Preußen Münster, 10 November 2012; 3,100 vs. SpVgg Unterhaching, 13 November 2012; 3,100 vs. Borussia Dortmund II, 9 April 2013
Home colours	Away colours	colours

The 2012–13 Stuttgarter Kickers season is the 113th season in the club's football history. In 2012–13 the club plays in the 3. Liga, the third tier of German football. It is the club's first season back in this league, having been promoted from the Regionalliga in 2012. The club also takes part in the 2012–13 edition of the Württemberg Cup.

== Matches ==
=== Legend ===
Win Draw Loss Postponed

=== Friendly matches ===
Date	Time	Stadium	City	Opponent	Result	Attendance	Goalscorers and carded players		Source
Date	Time	Stadium	City	Opponent	Result	Attendance	Stuttgarter Kickers	Opponent	Source
Pre–season friendlies
17 June	15:30	Sportplatz Sindringen	Forchtenberg, Germany	SG Sindringen-Ernsbach/Hohenloheauswahl	8–0	600	Sprung 12', 22', 41'; Marchese 18', 30' (pen.); Savranlıoğlu 21'; Stadler 68'; Ivanusa 81'	—	
22 June	19:00	Stadion Dettenhausen	Dettenhausen, Germany	Schönbuchauswahl	12–0	500	Alvarez 20'; Evers 25'; Leist 38'; Savranlıoğlu 39'; Jatta 49', 63', 76', 83', 87'; Grüttner 62', 75'; Marchese 68'	—	
28 June	18:00	Waldstadion Ellwangen	Ellwangen (Jagst), Germany	VfR Aalen	1–0	900	Grüttner 71'	—	
1 July	11:00	Würmtalstadion	Weil der Stadt, Germany	TSG Balingen	3–0	750	Sprung 26'; Leist 67' (pen.); Marchese 90'	—	
7 July	16:00	ADM-Sportpark	Stuttgart, Germany	FC Schalke 04 II	0–1	1,300	—	Caillas 2'	
10 July	18:30	Stadion Wannweil	Wannweil, Germany	SV Wannweil	19–0	400	Sprung; Leist; Ivanusa; Gerster; Grüttner; Jatta; Dicklhuber; Gondorf; Alvarez; Auracher; Köpf; Bauer; Own goal	—	
15 July	18:00	Gazi-Stadion auf der Waldau	Stuttgart, Germany	Celtic Glasgow	1–0	6,800	Jatta 41'	—	
Mid–season friendlies
5 January	16:00		Aksu, Turkey	1461 Trabzon	1–2		Köpf 42'	Erdoğan 14'; Memiş 58'	
8 January	17:00		Aksu, Turkey	Sanica Boru Elazığspor	1–0		Gondorf 48'	—	
13 January	14:00	Otto-Hoog-Stadion	Leimen, Germany	Wuppertaler SV	1–0	100	Marchese 7' (pen.)	—	
19 January	13:15	Sportgelände Zuzenhausen	Zuzenhausen, Germany	TSG Hoffenheim II	2–1	100	Rühle 1'; Marchese 72'	Schön 65'	

=== 3. Liga ===
==== League fixtures and results ====
Match	Date	Time	Stadium	City	Opponent	Result	Attendance	Goalscorers		Source
Match	Date	Time	Stadium	City	Opponent	Result	Attendance	Stuttgarter Kickers	Opponent	Source
1	21 July 2012	14:00	DKB-Arena	Rostock	F.C. Hansa Rostock	1–2	13,700	Grüttner 20'	Berger 33'; Plat 85'	
2	28 July 2012	14:00	Gazi-Stadion auf der Waldau	Stuttgart	SV Wehen Wiesbaden	0–0	3,510	—	—	
3	4 August 2012	14:00	Voith-Arena	Heidenheim	1. FC Heidenheim	1–2	9,000	Grüttner 49'	Frommer 11'; Göhlert 68'	
4	8 August 2012	19:00	Gazi-Stadion auf der Waldau	Stuttgart	Hallescher FC	0–0	4,600	—	—	
5	11 August 2012	14:00	Gazi-Stadion auf der Waldau	Stuttgart	VfB Stuttgart II	4–1	6,125	Fennell 20'; Grüttner 44', 90+1'; Savranlıoğlu 54'	Benyamina 13'	
6	25 August 2012	14:00	Gazi-Stadion auf der Waldau	Stuttgart	VfL Osnabrück	3–0	3,700	Grüttner 22'; Fennell 33'; Rühle 86'	—	
7	29 August 2012	19:00	Schüco-Arena	Bielefeld	Arminia Bielefeld	0–1	9,090	—	Klos 52'	
8	1 September 2012	14:00	Gazi-Stadion auf der Waldau	Stuttgart	Alemannia Aachen	3–1	4,050	Savranlıoğlu 3'; Leist 59'; Grüttner 88'	Baumgärtel 47'	
9	16 September 2012	14:00	Stadion Rote Erde	Dortmund	Borussia Dortmund II	1–1	1,610	Leist 68'	Meißner 45+1' (pen.)	
10	22 September 2012	14:00	Gazi-Stadion auf der Waldau	Stuttgart	1. FC Saarbrücken	1–2	4,100	Braun 11'	Ziemer 2'; Kohler 10'	
11	26 September 2012	19:00	Sparda Bank Hessen Stadium	Offenbach am Main	Kickers Offenbach	0–3	5,845	—	Hahn 30', 89'; Vogler 88'	
12	29 September 2012	14:00	Gazi-Stadion auf der Waldau	Stuttgart	Karlsruher SC	Postponed				
13	6 October 2012	14:00	Steigerwaldstadion	Erfurt	Rot-Weiß Erfurt	3–0	3,887	Marchese 53'; Grüttner 69', 76'	—	
14	20 October 2012	14:00	Gazi-Stadion auf der Waldau	Stuttgart	Wacker Burghausen	1–2	3,575	Grüttner 59'	Thiel 30'; Holz 73'	
12	24 October 2012	18:00	Gazi-Stadion auf der Waldau	Stuttgart	Karlsruher SC	0–2	6,420	—	Klingmann 35'; Alibaz 70'	
15	27 October 2012	14:00	Gazi-Stadion auf der Waldau	Stuttgart	SpVgg Unterhaching	Postponed				
16	3 November 2012	14:00	Karl-Liebknecht-Stadion	Potsdam	SV Babelsberg 03	0–1	2,828	—	Kreuels 10'	
17	10 November 2012	14:00	Gazi-Stadion auf der Waldau	Stuttgart	SC Preußen Münster	0–2	3,100	—	Nazarov 3'; Menga 90+2'	
15	13 November 2012	19:00	Gazi-Stadion auf der Waldau	Stuttgart	SpVgg Unterhaching	0–0	6,420	—	—	
18	17 November 2012	14:00	Stadion an der Gellertstraße	Chemnitz	Chemnitzer FC	0–2	4,750	—	Förster 63'; Fink 66'	
19	24 November 2012	14:00	Gazi-Stadion auf der Waldau	Stuttgart	SV Darmstadt 98	1–1	3,500	Grüttner 90'	Latza 75'	
20	1 December 2012	14:00	Gazi-Stadion auf der Waldau	Stuttgart	F.C. Hansa Rostock	2–0	4,050	Grüttner 57'; Leutenecker 83'	—	
21	8 December 2012	14:00	BRITA-Arena	Wiesbaden	SV Wehen Wiesbaden	Postponed				
22	15 December 2012	14:00	Gazi-Stadion auf der Waldau	Stuttgart	1. FC Heidenheim	0–2	3,250	—	Thurk 11'; Mayer 87'	
23	26 January 2013	14:00	Erdgas Sportpark	Halle	Hallescher FC	1–1	5,211	Ivanusa 57'	Furuholm 2'	
21	30 January 2013	19:00	BRITA-Arena	Wiesbaden	SV Wehen Wiesbaden	2–0	6,420	Braun 39'; Savranlıoğlu 77'	—	
24	2 February 2013	14:00	Gazi-Stadion auf der Waldau	Stuttgart	VfB Stuttgart II	3–0	4,100	Grüttner 14', 31'; Gondorf 31'	—	
25	10 February 2013	14:00	Osnatel-Arena	Osnabrück	VfL Osnabrück	1–3	10,000	Leist 23'	Staffeldt 11'; Nagy 34'; Zoller 63'	
26	16 February 2013	14:00	Gazi-Stadion auf der Waldau	Stuttgart	Arminia Bielefeld	Postponed				
27	23 February 2013	14:00	New Tivoli	Aachen	Alemannia Aachen	0–3	7,766	—	Schumacher 50', 76'; Marcel Heller 90'	
28	2 March 2013	14:00	Gazi-Stadion auf der Waldau	Stuttgart	Borussia Dortmund II	Postponed				
29	9 March 2013	14:00	Ludwigsparkstadion	Saarbrücken	1. FC Saarbrücken	0–3	3,824	—	Bach 44'; Eggert 86'; Ziemer 90'	
30	16 March 2013	14:00	Gazi-Stadion auf der Waldau	Stuttgart	Kickers Offenbach	0–2	3,500	—	Bäcker 21'; Kleineheismann 57'	
26	23 March 2013	15:00	Gazi-Stadion auf der Waldau	Stuttgart	Arminia Bielefeld	1–1	3,440	Grüttner 16'	Klos 56'	
31	30 March 2013	14:00	Wildparkstadion	Karlsruhe	Karlsruher SC	0–3	14,249	—	Çalhanoğlu 31' van der Biezen 38'; Mauersberger 81'	
32	6 April 2013	14:00	Gazi-Stadion auf der Waldau	Stuttgart	Rot-Weiß Erfurt	0–1	3,875	—	Pfingsten-Reddig 47'	
28	9 April 2013	19:00	Gazi-Stadion auf der Waldau	Stuttgart	Borussia Dortmund II	0–1	3,100	—	Hofmann 29'	
33	13 April 2013	14:00	Wacker-Arena	Burghausen	Wacker Burghausen	4–1	2,200	Marchese 45' (pen.); Grüttner 53', 75', 90'	Cinar 30'	
34	20 April 2013	14:00	Sportpark Unterhaching	Unterhaching	SpVgg Unterhaching	1–1	1,500	Marchese 22' (pen.)	Leist 77' (O.G.)	
35	27 April 2013	14:00	Gazi-Stadion auf der Waldau	Stuttgart	SV Babelsberg 03	2–1	3,600	Engelbrecht 53'; Marchese 89' (pen.)	Evljuskin 51'	
36	4 May 2013	14:00	Preußenstadion	Münster	SC Preußen Münster	0–1	12,245	Baumgärtel 79'	—	
37	11 May 2013	14:00	Gazi-Stadion auf der Waldau	Stuttgart	Chemnitzer FC	1–1	5,415	Grüttner 35'	Jansen 72'	
38	18 May 2013	14:00	Stadion am Böllenfalltor	Darmstadt	SV Darmstadt 98	1–1	13,600	Dicklhuber 12'	da Costa 84'	

==== Tables ====
===== League table =====
Pos	Team	Pld	W	D	L	GF	GA	GD	Pts	Promotion, qualification or relegation
15	Kickers Offenbach (Note: Offenbach has two points deducted for using bond money from a DFB fund. After the end of the season, Offenbach were not granted a license for the following season and are thus relegated.) (R)	38	11	11	16	41	44	−3	42	Relegation to Regionalliga
16	Borussia Dortmund II (Note: Reserve teams are ineligible for promotion or DFB-Pokal qualification.)	38	9	14	15	39	58	−19	41	
17	Stuttgarter Kickers	38	10	10	18	39	48	−9	40	
18	SV Darmstadt 98	38	8	14	16	32	46	−14	38	
19	SV Babelsberg 03 (R)	38	9	10	19	32	54	−22	37	Relegation to Regionalliga

Source: kicker
Rules for classification: 1) points; 2) goal difference; 3) number of goals scored.
(R) Relegated

===== Summary table =====
Overall								Home						Away					
Pld	W	D	L	GF	GA	GD	Pts	W	D	L	GF	GA	GD	W	D	L	GF	GA	GD
38	10	10	18	39	48	−9	40	5	6	8	18	19	−1	5	4	10	21	29	−8

Last updated: 29 September 2013.
Source: Fussballdaten.de

=== Württemberg Cup ===
Round	Date	Time	Venue	City	Opponent	Result^{1}	Attendance	Kickers goalscorers	Source
1	Bye								
2	1 August 2012	18:00	Hauptspielfeld Zimmern	Zimmern ob Rottweil	SV Zimmern	1–0	350	Gondorf 26' (pen.)	
3	17 August 2012	18:00	Stadion Unterbach	Spaichingen	SV Spaichingen	10–0	700	Alvarez 25', 56'; Sprung 29', 47', 55'; Gondorf 31'; Marchese 68'; Ivanusa 72'; Savranlıoğlu 74'; Grüttner 75'	
R16	5 September 2012	17:45	Sportplatz Salzstetten	Waldachtal	SF Salzstetten	9–0	1.100	Gondorf 10', 29'; Sprung 15', 71'; Ivanusa 24', 86'; Leutenecker 33'; Grüttner 74'; Dicklhuber 84'	
QF	3 October 2012	14:00	comtech-Arena	Aspach	Sonnenhof Großaspach	0–2	1.893	—	

== Squad information ==
=== Squad and statistics ===
Squad Season 2013–14
No.	Player	Nat.	Birthdate	at Kickers since	previous club	3L matches	3L goals	Cup matches	Cup goals	Total matches	Total goals
Goalkeepers
1	Daniel Wagner	(Germany)	11 February 1987	2009	VfR Aalen	17	0	0	0	17	0
23	Günay Güvenç	(Turkey)	25 July 1991	2009	Junior Team	11	0	0	0	11	0
38	Markus Krauss	(Germany)	16 September 1987	2012	Fortuna Düsseldorf	10	0	4	0	14	0
Defenders
2	Fabian Baumgärtel	(Germany)	7 July 1989	2013	Alemannia Aachen	15	1	0	0	15	1
3	Patrick Auracher	(Germany)	4 January 1990	2004	Junior Team	26	0	3	0	29	0
4	Simon Köpf	(Germany)	25 March 1987	2009	VfR Aalen	16	0	0	0	16	0
5	Julian Leist (vice-captain)	(Germany)	11 March 1988	2011	FC Bayern Munich II	36	3	2	0	38	3
17	Fabian Gerster	(Germany)	29 December 1986	2009	SC Pfullendorf	29	0	1	0	30	0
19	Kai-Bastian Evers	(Germany)	5 May 1990	2012	Sportfreunde Lotte	17	0	4	0	21	0
20	Thorben Stadler	(Germany)	8 February 1990	2012	Karlsruher SC	15	0	4	0	19	0
26	Royal-Dominique Fennell	(United States)	5 June 1989	2007	Junior Team	12	2	3	0	15	2
28	Pascal Schmidt	(Germany)	2 May 1993	2011	Junior Team	1	0	1	0	2	0
32	Christoph Bauer	(Germany)	1 June 1993	????	Junior Team	0	0	1	0	1	0
Midfielders
6	Sandrino Braun	(Germany)	4 July 1988	2012	SC Pfullendorf	33	2	4	0	37	2
7	Marcel Ivanusa	(Slovenia)	16 January 1985	1996	Junior Team	20	1	4	3	24	4
10	Vincenzo Marchese (captain)	(Italy)	19 May 1983	2009	SSV Ulm 1846	29	4	3	1	32	5
14	Tobias Rühle	(Germany)	7 February 1991	2012	1. FC Heidenheim	26	1	2	0	28	1
16	Fabio Leutenecker	(Germany)	15 March 1988	2006	Junior Team	33	1	3	1	36	2
18	Kevin Dicklhuber	(Germany)	6 March 1989	2012	SC Pfullendorf	15	1	2	1	17	2
22	Jérôme Gondorf	(Germany)	26 June 1988	2010	ASV Durlach	32	1	4	4	36	5
24	Mahir Savranlıoğlu	(Turkey)	7 August 1986	2009	FC Schalke 04 II	36	3	3	1	39	4
29	Marcos Alvarez	(Germany)	30 September 1991	2012	Eintracht Frankfurt II	15	0	3	2	18	2
Forwards
8	Nicolai Groß	(Germany)	3 February 1990	2013	1. FC Heidenheim	9	0	0	0	9	0
9	Marco Grüttner	(Germany)	17 October 1985	2011	VfR Aalen	37	18	3	2	40	20
11	Daniel Engelbrecht	(Germany)	5 November 1990	2013	VfL Bochum	14	1	0	0	14	1
15	Omar Jatta	(The Gambia)	1 January 1989	2011	FV Ravensburg	6	0	2	0	8	0
Players transferred after the start of the season
8	Peter Sprung	(Germany)	20 July 1979	2012	FC Bayern Alzenau	10	0	3	5	13	5
27	Rico Wentsch	(Germany)	13 January 1994	2012	Junior Team	2	0	1	0	3	0
Last updated: 14 November 2013

=== Goal scorers ===
All competitions

Scorer	Goals
(Germany) Marco Grüttner	20
(Germany) Jérôme Gondorf	5
(Germany) Peter Sprung	5
(Italy) Vincenzo Marchese	5
(Slovenia) Marcel Ivanusa	4
(Turkey) Mahir Savranlıoğlu	4
(Germany) Julian Leist	3
(Germany) Jérôme Gondorf	2
(Germany) Sandrino Braun	2
(Germany) Marcos Alvarez	2
(Germany) Fabio Leutenecker	2
(United States) Royal-Dominique Fennell	2
(Germany) Kevin Dicklhuber
(Germany) Daniel Engelbrecht	1
(Germany) Tobias Rühle	1
(Germany) Fabian Baumgärtel	1

3. Liga

Scorer	Goals
(Germany) Marco Grüttner	18
(Italy) Vincenzo Marchese	4
(Germany) Julian Leist	3
(Turkey) Mahir Savranlıoğlu	3
(Germany) Jérôme Gondorf
(Germany) Sandrino Braun	2
(United States) Royal-Dominique Fennell	2
(Slovenia) Marcel Ivanusa	1
(Germany) Jérôme Gondorf	1
(Germany) Fabio Leutenecker	1
(Germany) Kevin Dicklhuber	1
(Germany) Daniel Engelbrecht	1
(Germany) Tobias Rühle	1
(Germany) Fabian Baumgärtel	1

Württemberg Cup

Scorer	Goals
(Germany) Peter Sprung	5
(Germany) Jérôme Gondorf	4
(Slovenia) Marcel Ivanusa	3
(Germany) Marcos Alvarez	2
(Germany) Marco Grüttner	2
(Italy) Vincenzo Marchese	1
(Germany) Fabio Leutenecker	1
(Turkey) Mahir Savranlıoğlu	1
(Germany) Kevin Dicklhuber	1

Last updated: 24 October 2013

=== Penalties ===
All competitions

Player	Penalties
(Italy) Vincenzo Marchese	3
(Germany) Jérôme Gondorf	1
(Germany) Marcos Alvarez	1 (1)
(Germany) Julian Leist	1 (1)

3. Liga

Player	Penalties
(Italy) Vincenzo Marchese	3
(Germany) Marcos Alvarez	1 (1)
(Germany) Julian Leist	1 (1)

Württemberg Cup

Player	Penalties
(Germany) Jérôme Gondorf	1

()* = Penalties saved
Last updated: 24 October 2013

=== Transfers ===
==== In ====
#	Position	Player	Transferred from	Date	Reference
2	DF	(Germany) Fabian Baumgärtel	(Germany) Alemannia Aachen	19 January 2013	
6	MF	(Germany) Sandrino Braun	(Germany) SC Pfullendorf	1 June 2012	
8	FW	(Germany) Nicolai Groß	(Germany) 1. FC Heidenheim	17 January 2013	
11	FW	(Germany) Daniel Engelbrecht	(Germany) VfL Bochum	3 January 2013	
14	MF	(Germany) Tobias Rühle	(Germany) 1. FC Heidenheim	22 June 2012	
18	MF	(Germany) Kevin Dicklhuber	(Germany) SC Pfullendorf	1 July 2012	
19	DF	(Germany) Kai-Bastian Evers	(Germany) Sportfreunde Lotte	27 June 2012	
20	DF	(Germany) Thorben Stadler	(Germany) Karlsruher SC	14 June 2012	
29	MF	(Germany) Marcos Alvarez	(Germany) Eintracht Frankfurt II	5 June 2012	
38	GK	(Germany) Markus Krauss	(Germany) Fortuna Düsseldorf	4 June 2012	

==== Out ====
#	Position	Player	Transferred to	Reference
6	MF	(Germany) Demis Jung	(Germany) FC Nöttingen	
8	FW	(Germany) Peter Sprung	(Germany) Viktoria Aschaffenburg	
11	FW	(Germany) Marcel Brandstetter	(Germany) SSV Reutlingen	
14	MF	(Germany) Yannis Becker	(Germany) Fort Lewis College-Team	
18	FW	(Turkey) Uğur Yılmaz	(Germany) FV Illertissen	
19	MF	(Italy) Alessandro Abruscia	(Germany) TSG Hoffenheim II	

== Reserve team ==
Kickers' reserve team finished 14th in the Oberliga Baden-Württemberg and were coached by Jürgen Hartmann.

Note: Flags indicate national team as defined under FIFA eligibility rules; some limited exceptions apply. Players may hold more than one non-FIFA nationality.

No.	Pos.	Nation	Player
—	GK	GER	Mario Aller
—	GK	GER	Steffen Kraus
—	DF	GER	Patrick Weingart
—	DF	GER	Abdulsamed Akin
—	DF	CRO	Josip Biljeskovic
—	DF	GER	Michel Schäfer
—	DF	GER	Maximilian Goll
—	DF	GER	Pascal Schmidt
—	DF	GER	Marc Mägerle
—	MF	GER	Marco Gaiser
—	MF	GER	Daniel Kaiser
—	MF	GER	Bastian Joas

No.	Pos.	Nation	Player
—	MF	TUR	Ramazan Kandazoglu
—	MF	CRO	Christian Mijic
—	MF	GER	Timo Morawietz
—	MF	CRO	Jan Knezevic
—	MF	GER	Nico Plattek
—	MF	GER	Oliver Stierle
—	MF	GER	Heiko Schall
—	FW	GER	Tobias Heim
—	FW	SRB	Nermin Ibrahimović
—	FW	GRE	Kimon Koutsiofytis
—	FW	GER	André Kriks
