= 2016–17 DFB-Pokal =

Football tournament season

Tournament details
- Country: Germany
- Venue(s): Olympiastadion, Berlin
- Dates: 19 August 2016 – 27 May 2017
- Teams: 64

Final positions
- Champions: Borussia Dortmund (4th title)
- Runners-up: Eintracht Frankfurt
- Europa League: Hertha BSC

Tournament statistics
- Matches played: 63
- Goals scored: 200 (3.17 per match)
- Attendance: 1,394,666 (22,138 per match)
- Top goal scorer(s): Robert Lewandowski (5 goals)
- Goals scored in penalty shoot-outs not included.

The 2016–17 DFB-Pokal was the 74th season of the annual German football cup competition. Sixty-four teams participated in the competition, including all teams from the previous year's Bundesliga and the 2. Bundesliga. It began on 19 August 2016 with the first of six rounds and ended on 27 May 2017 with the final at the Olympiastadion in Berlin, a nominally neutral venue, which has hosted the final since 1985. The DFB-Pokal is considered the second-most important club title in German football after the Bundesliga championship. The DFB-Pokal is run by the German Football Association (DFB).

The defending champions were Bundesliga side Bayern Munich, after they beat Borussia Dortmund 4–3 on penalties in the previous final. Bayern Munich were knocked out of the competition in the semi-finals by Borussia Dortmund, the eventual winners, losing 2–3.

Borussia Dortmund defeated Eintracht Frankfurt 2–1 in the final to claim their fourth title and first since 2012.

Borussia Dortmund, the winners of the DFB-Pokal had already earned automatic qualification for the group stage of the 2017–18 edition of the UEFA Champions League through position in the Bundesliga. Therefore, the Europa League group stage spot went to the team in sixth, Hertha BSC, and the league's third qualifying round spot to the team in seventh, SC Freiburg. Dortmund also hosted the 2017 edition of the DFL-Supercup at the start of the 2017–18 season, when they faced the champion of the 2016–17 Bundesliga, Bayern Munich.

== Participating clubs ==
The following 64 teams qualified for the competition:

Bundesliga the 18 clubs of the 2015–16 season	2. Bundesliga; the 18 clubs of the 2015–16 season	3. Liga; the top 4 clubs of the 2015–16 season
FC Augsburg; Bayer Leverkusen; Bayern Munich; Darmstadt 98; Borussia Dortmund; Borussia Mönchengladbach; Eintracht Frankfurt; Hamburger SV; Hannover 96; Hertha BSC; 1899 Hoffenheim; FC Ingolstadt; 1. FC Köln; Mainz 05; Schalke 04; VfB Stuttgart; Werder Bremen; VfL Wolfsburg	Arminia Bielefeld; VfL Bochum; Eintracht Braunschweig; MSV Duisburg; Fortuna Düsseldorf; FSV Frankfurt; SC Freiburg; Greuther Fürth; 1. FC Heidenheim; 1. FC Kaiserslautern; Karlsruher SC; RB Leipzig; 1860 Munich; 1. FC Nürnberg; SC Paderborn; SV Sandhausen; FC St. Pauli; Union Berlin	Dynamo Dresden; Erzgebirge Aue; Würzburger Kickers; 1. FC Magdeburg
Representatives of the regional associations 24 representatives of 21 regional associations of the DFB, qualified (in general) through the 2015–16 Verbandspokal (Note: The three regions with the most participating teams in their league competitions (Bavaria, Lower Saxony, and Westphalia) are allowed to enter two teams for the competition.)
Baden; Astoria Walldorf: Bavaria (Note: In addition to the Bavarian Cup winners, the best-placed amateur team of the Regionalliga Bayern also qualified.); SpVgg Unterhaching (Note: Since Bavarian Cup winners Würzburger Kickers already qualified via their 3. Liga position, finalists SpVgg Unterhaching took the spot.) Jahn Regensburg: Berlin; BFC Preussen: Brandenburg; SV Babelsberg: Bremen; Bremer SV: Hamburg; Eintracht Norderstedt: Hesse; Kickers Offenbach	Lower Rhine; Rot-Weiss Essen: Lower Saxony (Note: Both finalists of the Lower Saxony Cup qualified.); SV Drochtersen/Assel Germania Egestorf/Langreder: Mecklenburg-Vorpommern; Hansa Rostock: Middle Rhine; Viktoria Köln: Rhineland; Eintracht Trier (Note: Eintracht Trier qualified regardless of the outcome of the final of the Rhineland Cup, as combined football sections of clubs such as SG HWW Niederroßbach, the other finalists, are not allowed entrance into the DFB-Pokal.): Saarland; FC 08 Homburg: Saxony; FSV Zwickau (Note: Since Saxony Cup winners Erzgebirge Aue already qualified via their 3. Liga position, finalists FSV Zwickau took the spot.)	Saxony-Anhalt; Hallescher FC (Note: Hallescher FC qualified regardless of the outcome of the final of the Saxony-Anhalt Cup, as 1. FC Magdeburg, the other finalists, already qualified for the DFB-Pokal through their 3. Liga position.): Schleswig-Holstein; VfB Lübeck: South Baden; FC 08 Villingen: Southwest; SC Hauenstein: Thuringia; Carl Zeiss Jena: Westphalia (Note: In addition to the Westphalian Cup winners, the winners of a play-off between the best-placed amateur Westphalian team of the Regionalliga West and the best-placed amateur team of the Oberliga Westfalen also qualified.); SG Wattenscheid Sportfreunde Lotte: Württemberg; FV Ravensburg

== Format ==
=== Participation ===
The DFB-Pokal began with a round of 64 teams. The 36 teams of the Bundesliga and 2. Bundesliga, along with the top four finishers of the 3. Liga were automatically qualified for the tournament. Of the remaining slots, 21 are given to the cup winners of the regional football associations, the Verbandspokal. The three remaining slots were given to the three regional associations with the most men's teams, which currently is Bavaria, Lower Saxony, and Westphalia. The runner-up of the Lower Saxony Cup was given the slot, along with the best-placed amateur team of the Regionalliga Bayern. For Westphalia, the winner of a play-off between the best-placed team of the Regionalliga West and Oberliga Westfalen also qualified. As every team was entitled to participate in local tournaments which qualify for the association cups, every team can in principle compete in the DFB-Pokal. Reserve teams and combined football sections are not permitted to enter, along with no two teams of the same association or corporation.

=== Draw ===
The draws for the different rounds were conducted as following:

For the first round, the participating teams were split into two pots of 32 teams each. The first pot contained all teams which have qualified through their regional cup competitions, the best four teams of the 3. Liga, and the bottom four teams of the 2. Bundesliga. Every team from this pot was drawn to a team from the second pot, which contained all remaining professional teams (all the teams of the Bundesliga and the remaining fourteen 2. Bundesliga teams). The teams from the first pot were set as the home team in the process.

The two-pot scenario was also applied for the second round, with the remaining 3. Liga and/or amateur team(s) in the first pot and the remaining Bundesliga and 2. Bundesliga teams in the other pot. Once again, the 3. Liga and/or amateur team(s) served as hosts. This time the pots did not have to be of equal size though, depending on the results of the first round. Theoretically, it was even possible that there may be only one pot, if all of the teams from one of the pots from the first round beat all the others in the second pot. Once one pot is empty, the remaining pairings were drawn from the other pot with the first-drawn team for a match serving as hosts.

For the remaining rounds, the draw was conducted from just one pot. Any remaining 3. Liga and/or amateur team(s) were the home team if drawn against a professional team. In every other case, the first-drawn team served as hosts.

=== Match rules ===
Teams met in one game per round. Matches took place for 90 minutes, with two halves of 45 minutes. If still tied after regulation, 30 minutes of extra time were played, consisting of two periods of 15 minutes. If the score was still level after this, the match was decided by a penalty shoot-out. A coin toss decided who took the first penalty.

A total of seven players were allowed to be listed on the substitute bench. For the first two rounds of the competition, a maximum of three players could be substituted, regardless of whether the match went into extra time. However, after a proposal by the German Football Association, the IFAB approved the use of a fourth substitute in extra time as part of a pilot project. This rule went into effect starting with the round of 16 onwards.

=== Suspensions ===
If a player received five yellow cards in the competition, he was then suspended from the next cup match. Similarly, receiving a second yellow card suspended a player from the next cup match. If a player received a direct red card, they were suspended a minimum of one match, but the German Football Association reserved the right to increase the suspension.

=== Champion qualification ===
The winner of the DFB-Pokal earns automatic qualification for the group stage of next year's edition of the UEFA Europa League. As winners Borussia Dortmund had already qualified for the UEFA Champions League by finishing 3rd in the Bundesliga, the spot went to the team in sixth, Hertha BSC, and the league's second qualifying round spot went to the team in seventh, SC Freiburg. As winner, Dortmund also hosted the 2017 DFL-Supercup at the start of the next season, and faced the champion of the previous year's Bundesliga, Bayern Munich.

== Schedule ==
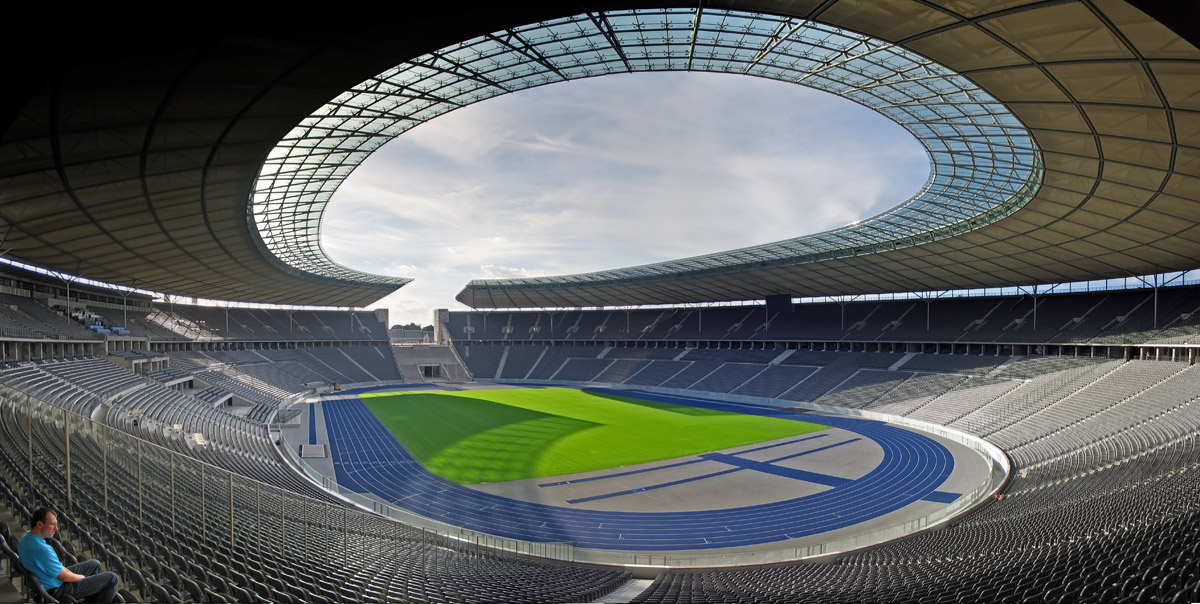
The Olympiastadion in Berlin hosted the final.

The rounds of the 2016–17 competition were scheduled as follows:

Round	Draw date and time	Matches
First round	18 June 2016, 23:30	19–22 August 2016
Second round	26 August 2016, 22:45	25–26 October 2016
Round of 16	26 October 2016, 23:45	7–8 February 2017
Quarter-finals	8 February 2017, 23:15	28 February – 1 March 2017
Semi-finals	1 March 2017, 23:15	25–26 April 2017
Final	1 March 2017, 23:15	27 May 2017 at Olympiastadion, Berlin

== Matches ==
A total of sixty-three matches took place, starting with the first round on 19 August 2016, and culminating with the final on 27 May 2017 at the Olympiastadion in Berlin.

Times up to 29 October 2016 and from 26 March 2017 are CEST (UTC+2). Times from 30 October 2016 to 25 March 2017 are CET (UTC+1).

=== First round ===
The draw was held on 18 June 2016 at 23:30. Caroline Siems drew the games.

19 August 2016	VfB Lübeck	0–3	FC St. Pauli	Lübeck
20:45		Report	Hedenstad 16'; Gonther 61'; Ducksch 88'	Stadium: Stadion Lohmühle; Attendance: 13,000; Referee: Martin Thomsen

19 August 2016	FV Ravensburg	0–2	FC Augsburg	Pfullendorf (Note: The match took place at the Geberit-Arena in Pfullendorf instead of FV Ravensburg's home stadium.)
20:45		Report	Koo 29'; Bobadilla 68'	Stadium: Geberit-Arena; Attendance: 8,000; Referee: Benedikt Kempkes

19 August 2016	Carl Zeiss Jena	0–5	Bayern Munich	Jena
20:45		Report	Lewandowski 3', 34', 43'; Vidal 72'; Hummels 77'	Stadium: Ernst-Abbe-Sportfeld; Attendance: 19,000; Referee: Harm Osmers

20 August 2016	SV Drochtersen/Assel	0–1	Borussia Mönchengladbach	Drochtersen
15:30		Report	Korb 55'	Stadium: Kehdinger Stadion; Attendance: 7,154; Referee: Matthias Jöllenbeck

20 August 2016	Würzburger Kickers	1–0 (a.e.t.)	Eintracht Braunschweig	Würzburg
15:30	Soriano 102'	Report		Stadium: flyeralarm Arena; Attendance: 6,384; Referee: Jochen Drees

20 August 2016	SV Babelsberg	0–4	SC Freiburg	Potsdam
15:30		Report	Grifo 20' (pen.), 63'; Haberer 40'; Niederlechner 69'	Stadium: Karl-Liebknecht-Stadion; Attendance: 6,341; Referee: René Rohde

20 August 2016	Viktoria Köln	1–1 (a.e.t.) (5–6 p)	1. FC Nürnberg	Cologne
15:30	Wunderlich 80'	Report	Margreitter 76'	Stadium: Sportpark Höhenberg; Attendance: 4,787; Referee: Daniel Schlager
	Penalties
	Wunderlich (penalty scored); Nottbeck (penalty scored); Backszat (penalty scored); Koronkiewicz (penalty scored); Schwarz (penalty scored); Holzweiler (penalty missed)		(penalty scored) Burgstaller; (penalty scored) Behrens; (penalty scored) Kempe; (penalty scored) Brečko; (penalty scored) Leibold; (penalty scored) Alushi

20 August 2016	Rot-Weiss Essen	2–2 (a.e.t.) (4–5 p)	Arminia Bielefeld	Essen
15:30	Malura 53'; Baier 77' (pen.)	Report	Klos 9', 69'	Stadium: Stadion Essen; Attendance: 17,500; Referee: Christian Dingert
	Penalties
	Löning (penalty scored); Brauer (penalty scored); Malura (penalty missed); Weber (penalty scored); Baier (penalty scored)		(penalty scored) Klos; (penalty scored) Junglas; (penalty scored) Ulm; (penalty scored) Putaro; (penalty scored) Hemlein

20 August 2016	FC 08 Villingen	1–4	Schalke 04	Freiburg im Breisgau (Note: The match took place at the Schwarzwald-Stadion in Freiburg im Breisgau instead of FC 08 Villingen's home stadium.)
15:30	Ketterer 90'	Report	Aogo 10'; Embolo 19'; Geis 75'; Huntelaar 86'	Stadium: Schwarzwald-Stadion; Attendance: 14,400; Referee: Patrick Alt

20 August 2016	Dynamo Dresden	2–2 (a.e.t.) (5–4 p)	RB Leipzig	Dresden
15:30	Kutschke 47' (pen.), 78'	Report	Sabitzer 15'; Kaiser 45+2' (pen.)	Stadium: DDV-Stadion; Attendance: 29,222; Referee: Felix Brych
	Penalties
	Testroet (penalty scored); Stefaniak (penalty scored); Teixeira (penalty scored); Gogia (penalty scored); Aosman (penalty scored)		(penalty scored) Kalmár; (penalty scored) Orban; (penalty scored) Ilsanker; (penalty missed) Kaiser; (penalty scored) Halstenberg

20 August 2016	BFC Preussen	0–7	1. FC Köln	Berlin (Note: The match took place at the Stadion An der Alten Försterei in Berlin instead of BFC Preussen's home stadium.)
15:30		Report	Rausch 19'; Modeste 45'; Maroh 68'; Risse 71'; Rudņevs 75'; Osako 79', 88'	Stadium: Stadion An der Alten Försterei; Attendance: 6,318; Referee: Alexander Sather

20 August 2016	Hallescher FC	4–3 (a.e.t.)	1. FC Kaiserslautern	Halle
15:30	Aliji 34' (o.g.); El-Helwe 54', 58'; Gjasula 94' (pen.)	Report	Osawe 23', 90+4'; Stieber 37'	Stadium: ERDGAS Sportpark; Attendance: 10,021; Referee: Bibiana Steinhaus

20 August 2016	1860 Munich	2–1	Karlsruher SC	Munich
18:30	Aigner 60'; Matmour 90+2'	Report	Diamantakos 67'	Stadium: Allianz Arena; Attendance: 16,800; Referee: Sascha Stegemann

20 August 2016	Hansa Rostock	0–3	Fortuna Düsseldorf	Rostock
18:30		Report	Sobottka 21', 57'; Bebou 62'	Stadium: Ostseestadion; Attendance: 18,100; Referee: Frank Willenborg

20 August 2016	FC 08 Homburg	0–3	VfB Stuttgart	Homburg
18:30		Report	Gentner 53'; Özcan 58'; Tashchy 87'	Stadium: Waldstadion Homburg; Attendance: 10,800; Referee: Robert Hartmann

20 August 2016	FSV Frankfurt	1–2	VfL Wolfsburg	Frankfurt
20:45	Schleusener 52'	Report	Schäfer 5' (o.g.); Dost 16'	Stadium: Frankfurter Volksbank Stadion; Attendance: 5,050; Referee: Wolfgang Stark

21 August 2016	Sportfreunde Lotte	2–1	Werder Bremen	Lotte
15:30	Rahn 8'; Dej 54'	Report	Junuzović 45'	Stadium: FRIMO Stadion; Attendance: 10,056; Referee: Christian Dietz

21 August 2016	MSV Duisburg	1–2 (a.e.t.)	Union Berlin	Duisburg
15:30	Iljutcenko 67'	Report	Quaner 62'; Schnellhardt 95' (o.g.)	Stadium: Schauinsland-Reisen-Arena; Attendance: 14,209; Referee: Marco Fritz

21 August 2016	Eintracht Norderstedt	1–4	Greuther Fürth	Norderstedt
15:30	Drinkuth 80'	Report	Žulj 42'; Dursun 71'; Tripić 89'; Kirsch 90+2'	Stadium: Edmund-Plambeck-Stadion; Attendance: 3,000; Referee: Benjamin Bläser

21 August 2016	Astoria Walldorf	4–3 (a.e.t.)	VfL Bochum	Walldorf
15:30	Groß 6'; Carl 55'; Meyer 95'; Straub 107'	Report	Stiepermann 22'; Stöger 65', 117'	Stadium: FC-Astoria Stadion; Attendance: 3,000; Referee: Riem Hussein

21 August 2016	1. FC Magdeburg	1–1 (a.e.t.) (3–4 p)	Eintracht Frankfurt	Magdeburg
15:30	Hammann 86'	Report	Hrgota 7'	Stadium: MDCC-Arena; Attendance: 24,400; Referee: Markus Schmidt
	Penalties
	Hammann (penalty scored); Puttkammer (penalty missed); Müller (penalty missed); Exslager (penalty scored); Beck (penalty scored); Löhmannsröben (penalty missed)		(penalty scored) Meier; (penalty scored) Huszti; (penalty missed) Hasebe; (penalty missed) Mascarell; (penalty scored) Blum; (penalty scored) Varela

21 August 2016	SpVgg Unterhaching	3–3 (a.e.t.) (2–4 p)	Mainz 05	Unterhaching
15:30	Hain 33', 89'; Lux 90+3'	Report	Córdoba 22'; Frei 64'; Mallı 88'	Stadium: Alpenbauer Sportpark; Attendance: 7,000; Referee: Arne Aarnink
	Penalties
	Stahl (penalty missed); Hain (penalty missed); Dombrowka (penalty scored); Einsiedler (penalty scored)		(penalty scored) de Blasis; (penalty scored) Mallı; (penalty scored) Clemens; (penalty scored) Rodríguez

21 August 2016	Germania Egestorf/Langreder	0–6	1899 Hoffenheim	Barsinghausen
15:30		Report	Kramarić 18', 32', 80'; Rudy 21'; Uth 43'; Wagner 90'	Stadium: Joyetech-Arena; Attendance: 2,585; Referee: Marcel Schütz

21 August 2016	SC Hauenstein	1–2	Bayer Leverkusen	Pirmasens (Note: The match took place at the Sportpark Husterhöhe in Pirmasens instead of SC Hauenstein's home stadium.)
15:30	Srzentić 81'	Report	Hernández 39'; Bellarabi 67'	Stadium: Sportpark Husterhöhe; Attendance: 4,000; Referee: Florian Badstübner

21 August 2016	Bremer SV	0–7	Darmstadt 98	Bremen (Note: The match took place at the Stadion am Panzenberg in Bremen instead of Bremer SV's home stadium.)
15:30		Report	Čolak 18', 45+2', 58'; Kmieć 22' (o.g.); Heller 40'; Gondorf 56'; Schipplock 87'	Stadium: Stadion am Panzenberg; Attendance: 1,993; Referee: Lasse Koslowski

21 August 2016	SG Wattenscheid	1–2	1. FC Heidenheim	Bochum
18:30	Tumbul 30'	Report	Verhoek 75'; Thomalla 80'	Stadium: Lohrheidestadion; Attendance: 3,323; Referee: Timo Gerach

21 August 2016	Jahn Regensburg	1–1 (a.e.t.) (3–5 p)	Hertha BSC	Regensburg
18:30	Nandzik 51'	Report	Weiser 84'	Stadium: Continental Arena; Attendance: 12,526; Referee: Robert Kampka
	Penalties
	Thommy (penalty scored); Džalto (penalty scored); Hein (penalty scored); Hofrath (penalty missed)		(penalty scored) Ibišević; (penalty scored) Darida; (penalty scored) Weiser; (penalty scored) Plattenhardt; (penalty scored) Kalou

21 August 2016	Erzgebirge Aue	0–0 (a.e.t.) (7–8 p)	FC Ingolstadt	Aue
18:30		Report		Stadium: Sparkassen-Erzgebirgsstadion; Attendance: 6,650; Referee: Sören Storks
	Penalties
	Rizzuto (penalty scored); Köpke (penalty scored); Kvesić (penalty scored); Pepić (penalty scored); Nazarov (penalty scored); Breitkreuz (penalty scored); Hertner (penalty scored); Adler (penalty missed)		(penalty scored) Cohen; (penalty scored) Suttner; (penalty scored) Leckie; (penalty scored) Groß; (penalty scored) Hinterseer; (penalty scored) Matip; (penalty scored) Roger; (penalty scored) Levels

22 August 2016	Kickers Offenbach	2–3 (a.e.t.)	Hannover 96	Offenbach
18:30	Firat 29', 49'	Report	Harnik 3'; Klaus 22'; Sané 120+1' (pen.)	Stadium: Sparda-Bank-Hessen-Stadion; Attendance: 10,573; Referee: Thorben Siewer

22 August 2016	FSV Zwickau	0–1	Hamburger SV	Zwickau
18:30		Report	Halilović 70'	Stadium: Stadion Zwickau; Attendance: 10,134; Referee: Robert Kempter

22 August 2016	SC Paderborn	1–2	SV Sandhausen	Paderborn
18:30	Michel 50'	Report	Sukuta-Pasu 18' (pen.); Kister 90+1'	Stadium: Benteler-Arena; Attendance: 4,436; Referee: Martin Petersen

22 August 2016	Eintracht Trier	0–3	Borussia Dortmund	Trier
20:45		Report	Kagawa 8', 33'; Schürrle 45'	Stadium: Moselstadion; Attendance: 10,805; Referee: Manuel Gräfe

=== Second round ===
The draw was held on 26 August 2016 at 22:45, with Oliver Bierhoff drawing the games.

25 October 2016	Sportfreunde Lotte	2–2 (a.e.t.) (4–3 p)	Bayer Leverkusen	Lotte
18:30	Hilbert 47' (o.g.); Freiberger 105+1'	Report	Volland 25', 95'	Stadium: FRIMO Stadion; Attendance: 8,763; Referee: Tobias Welz
	Penalties
	Nauber (penalty missed); Freiberger (penalty missed); Steinhart (penalty scored); Dej (penalty scored); Langlitz (penalty scored); Tankulić (penalty scored)		(penalty missed) Aránguiz; (penalty scored) Havertz; (penalty missed) Volland; (penalty scored) Hilbert; (penalty scored) Wendell; (penalty missed) Baumgartlinger

25 October 2016	Dynamo Dresden	0–1	Arminia Bielefeld	Dresden
18:30		Report	Hemlein 66'	Stadium: DDV-Stadion; Attendance: 26,819; Referee: Robert Kampka

25 October 2016	Würzburger Kickers	0–0 (a.e.t.) (3–4 p)	1860 Munich	Würzburg
18:30		Report		Stadium: flyeralarm Arena; Attendance: 12,142; Referee: Markus Schmidt
	Penalties
	Rama (penalty scored); Soriano (penalty missed); Benatelli (penalty scored); Pisot (penalty scored); Daghfous (penalty missed)		(penalty scored) Ayçiçek; (penalty scored) Uduokhai; (penalty scored) Wittek; (penalty missed) Stojković; (penalty scored) Mölders

25 October 2016	SC Freiburg	3–3 (a.e.t.) (3–4 p)	SV Sandhausen	Freiburg im Breisgau
18:30	Møller Dæhli 21'; Grifo 76'; Petersen 82'	Report	Kister 39'; Wooten 53'; Sukuta-Pasu 64'	Stadium: Schwarzwald-Stadion; Attendance: 14,600; Referee: Tobias Stieler
	Penalties
	Petersen (penalty missed); Günter (penalty scored); Torrejón (penalty missed); Grifo (penalty scored); Philipp (penalty scored); Haberer (penalty missed)		(penalty missed) Roßbach; (penalty scored) Sukuta-Pasu; (penalty scored) Kister; (penalty missed) Pledl; (penalty scored) Karl; (penalty scored) Vunguidica

25 October 2016	Hallescher FC	0–4	Hamburger SV	Halle
20:45		Report	Wood 8', 43'; Lasogga 57'; Waldschmidt 82'	Stadium: ERDGAS Sportpark; Attendance: 14,004; Referee: Christian Dingert

25 October 2016	Eintracht Frankfurt	0–0 (a.e.t.) (4–1 p)	FC Ingolstadt	Frankfurt
20:45		Report		Stadium: Commerzbank-Arena; Attendance: 6,300; Referee: Harm Osmers
	Penalties
	Huszti (penalty scored); Oczipka (penalty scored); Mascarell (penalty scored); Hasebe (penalty scored)		(penalty scored) Cohen; (penalty missed) Christiansen; (penalty missed) Hartmann

25 October 2016	Borussia Mönchengladbach	2–0	VfB Stuttgart	Mönchengladbach
20:45	Johnson 32'; Stindl 84'	Report		Stadium: BORUSSIA-PARK; Attendance: 40,452; Referee: Günter Perl

25 October 2016	FC St. Pauli	0–2	Hertha BSC	Hamburg
20:45		Report	Weiser 42'; Stocker 54'	Stadium: Millerntor-Stadion; Attendance: 29,123; Referee: Deniz Aytekin

26 October 2016	Astoria Walldorf	1–0	Darmstadt 98	Walldorf
18:30	Hillenbrand 32'	Report		Stadium: FC-Astoria Stadion; Attendance: 4,000; Referee: Bibiana Steinhaus

26 October 2016	Hannover 96	6–1	Fortuna Düsseldorf	Hanover
18:30	Sobiech 5'; Klaus 7', 34'; Harnik 15', 16'; Maier 53'	Report	Akpoguma 20'	Stadium: HDI-Arena; Attendance: 20,500; Referee: Benjamin Cortus

26 October 2016	1. FC Heidenheim	0–1	VfL Wolfsburg	Heidenheim
18:30		Report	Gómez 49'	Stadium: Voith-Arena; Attendance: 9,200; Referee: Benjamin Brand

26 October 2016	Greuther Fürth	2–1	Mainz 05	Fürth
18:30	Sararer 79'; Tripić 90'	Report	Córdoba 68'	Stadium: Sportpark Ronhof Thomas Sommer; Attendance: 5,975; Referee: Guido Winkmann

26 October 2016	1. FC Nürnberg	2–3	Schalke 04	Nuremberg
20:45	Baba 59' (o.g.); Kempe 68' (pen.)	Report	Konoplyanka 20', 45'; Huntelaar 31'	Stadium: Stadion Nürnberg; Attendance: 28,281; Referee: Frank Willenborg

26 October 2016	1. FC Köln	2–1 (a.e.t.)	1899 Hoffenheim	Cologne
20:45	Risse 36'; Modeste 91'	Report	Hübner 8'	Stadium: RheinEnergieSTADION; Attendance: 43,000; Referee: Marco Fritz

26 October 2016	Bayern Munich	3–1	FC Augsburg	Munich
20:45	Lahm 2'; Green 41'; Alaba 90+3'	Report	Ji 68'	Stadium: Allianz Arena; Attendance: 73,500; Referee: Sascha Stegemann

26 October 2016	Borussia Dortmund	1–1 (a.e.t.) (3–0 p)	Union Berlin	Dortmund
21:00 (Note: The match was originally scheduled to start at 20:45, but was delayed 15 minutes due to a traffic jam around the stadium.)	Parensen 44' (o.g.)	Report	Skrzybski 81'	Stadium: SIGNAL IDUNA PARK; Attendance: 79,037; Referee: Jochen Drees
	Penalties
	Dembélé (penalty scored); Ginter (penalty scored); Götze (penalty scored)		(penalty missed) Kroos; (penalty missed) Fürstner; (penalty missed) Hosiner

=== Round of 16 ===
The draw was held on 26 October 2016 at 23:45, with Fabian Hambüchen drawing the games.

7 February 2017	Hamburger SV	2–0	1. FC Köln	Hamburg
18:30	Jung 5'; Wood 76'	Report		Stadium: Volksparkstadion; Attendance: 45,143; Referee: Günter Perl

7 February 2017	Astoria Walldorf	1–1 (a.e.t.) (4–5 p)	Arminia Bielefeld	Walldorf
18:30	Carl 78'	Report	Schütz 52'	Stadium: FC-Astoria Stadion; Attendance: 4,000; Referee: Sven Jablonski
	Penalties
	Kern (penalty scored); Carl (penalty scored); Haas (penalty scored); Groß (penalty missed); Stadler (penalty scored); Kiermeier (penalty missed)		(penalty missed) Klos; (penalty scored) Junglas; (penalty scored) Schütz; (penalty scored) Voglsammer; (penalty scored) Nöthe; (penalty scored) Salger

7 February 2017	Bayern Munich	1–0	VfL Wolfsburg	Munich
20:45	Douglas Costa 18'	Report		Stadium: Allianz Arena; Attendance: 73,500; Referee: Jochen Drees

7 February 2017	Greuther Fürth	0–2	Borussia Mönchengladbach	Fürth
20:45		Report	Wendt 12'; Hazard 36' (pen.)	Stadium: Sportpark Ronhof Thomas Sommer; Attendance: 12,336; Referee: Bastian Dankert

8 February 2017	Sportfreunde Lotte	2–0	1860 Munich	Lotte
18:30	Lindner 28'; Freiberger 58'	Report		Stadium: FRIMO Stadion; Attendance: 10,059; Referee: Christian Dingert

8 February 2017	SV Sandhausen	1–4	Schalke 04	Sandhausen
18:30	Wooten 64'	Report	Schöpf 38'; Caligiuri 43'; Naldo 45+1'; Konoplyanka 71'	Stadium: Hardtwaldstadion; Attendance: 14,500; Referee: Benjamin Brand

8 February 2017	Borussia Dortmund	1–1 (a.e.t.) (3–2 p)	Hertha BSC	Dortmund
20:45	Reus 47'	Report	Kalou 27'	Stadium: SIGNAL IDUNA PARK; Attendance: 80,500; Referee: Deniz Aytekin
	Penalties
	Dembélé (penalty scored); Pulisic (penalty missed); Aubameyang (penalty scored); Castro (penalty scored)		(penalty missed) Lustenberger; (penalty missed) Darida; (penalty scored) Esswein; (penalty scored) Allagui; (penalty missed) Kalou

8 February 2017	Hannover 96	1–2	Eintracht Frankfurt	Hanover
20:45	Harnik 57'	Report	Tawatha 62'; Seferovic 66'	Stadium: HDI-Arena; Attendance: 31,000; Referee: Robert Kampka

=== Quarter-finals ===
The draw took place on 8 February 2017 at 23:15, with Mark Forster drawing the games.

28 February 2017	Eintracht Frankfurt	1–0	Arminia Bielefeld	Frankfurt
18:30	Blum 6'	Report		Stadium: Commerzbank-Arena; Attendance: 39,000; Referee: Felix Zwayer

1 March 2017	Hamburger SV	1–2	Borussia Mönchengladbach	Hamburg
18:40 (Note: The match was originally scheduled to start at 18:30, but was delayed 10 minutes due to a traffic jam around the stadium.)	Wood 90+2'	Report	Stindl 53' (pen.); Raffael 61' (pen.)	Stadium: Volksparkstadion; Attendance: 53,249; Referee: Marco Fritz

1 March 2017	Bayern Munich	3–0	Schalke 04	Munich
20:45	Lewandowski 3', 29'; Thiago 16'	Report		Stadium: Allianz Arena; Attendance: 75,000; Referee: Daniel Siebert

14 March 2017 (Note: The match, originally scheduled for 28 February 2017, 20:45, was cancelled due to poor pitch conditions, and was rescheduled for two weeks later.)	Sportfreunde Lotte	0–3	Borussia Dortmund	Osnabrück (Note: The match was originally scheduled to take place at Sportfreunde Lotte's home stadium, the FRIMO Stadion in Lotte. However, due to the cancellation of the original match due to poor pitch conditions, the match was rescheduled to take place at the Stadion an der Bremer Brücke in Osnabrück.)
18:30		Report	Pulisic 57'; Schürrle 66'; Schmelzer 83'	Stadium: Stadion an der Bremer Brücke; Attendance: 15,780; Referee: Felix Brych

=== Semi-finals ===
The draw took place on 1 March 2017 at 23:15, with Matthias Sammer drawing the games.

25 April 2017
20:45

Borussia Mönchengladbach	1–1 (a.e.t.)	Eintracht Frankfurt
Hofmann 45+2'	Report	Tawatha 15'
Penalties
Stindl (penalty scored); Herrmann (penalty scored); Hahn (penalty scored); Strobl (penalty scored); Bénes (penalty scored); Vestergaard (penalty scored); Christensen (penalty missed); Sow (penalty missed)	6–7	(penalty scored) Oczipka; (penalty scored) Hector; (penalty scored) Gaćinović; (penalty scored) Fabián; (penalty scored) Russ; (penalty scored) Seferovic; (penalty missed) Varela; (penalty scored) Hrgota

BORUSSIA-PARK, Mönchengladbach
Attendance: 54,014
Referee: Deniz Aytekin

26 April 2017
20:45

Bayern Munich	2–3	Borussia Dortmund
Martínez 28'; Hummels 41'	Report	Reus 19'; Aubameyang 69'; Dembélé 74'

Allianz Arena, Munich
Attendance: 75,000
Referee: Manuel Gräfe

=== Final ===
The final took place on 27 May 2017 at the Olympiastadion in Berlin.

27 May 2017
20:00 CEST

Eintracht Frankfurt	1–2	Borussia Dortmund
Rebić 29'	Report	Dembélé 8'; Aubameyang 67' (pen.)

Olympiastadion, Berlin
Attendance: 74,322
Referee: Deniz Aytekin (Oberasbach)

== Bracket ==
The following is the bracket which the DFB-Pokal resembled. Numbers in parentheses next to the match score represent the results of a penalty shoot-out.

First round 19–22 August 2016
Hallescher FC (a.e.t.)	4
1. FC Kaiserslautern	3
FSV Zwickau	0
Hamburger SV	1
BFC Preussen	0
1. FC Köln	7
Germania Egestorf/Langreder	0
1899 Hoffenheim	6
Eintracht Norderstedt	1
Greuther Fürth	4
SpVgg Unterhaching	3 (2)
Mainz 05 (p)	3 (4)
SV Drochtersen/Assel	0
Borussia Mönchengladbach	1
FC 08 Homburg	0
VfB Stuttgart	3
Kickers Offenbach	2
Hannover 96 (a.e.t.)	3
Hansa Rostock	0
Fortuna Düsseldorf	3
1. FC Magdeburg	1 (3)
Eintracht Frankfurt (p)	1 (4)
Erzgebirge Aue	0 (7)
FC Ingolstadt (p)	0 (8)
Astoria Walldorf (a.e.t.)	4
VfL Bochum	3
Bremer SV	0
Darmstadt 98	7
Dynamo Dresden (p)	2 (5)
RB Leipzig	2 (4)
Rot-Weiss Essen (p)	2 (4)
Arminia Bielefeld	2 (5)
Carl Zeiss Jena	0
Bayern Munich	5
FV Ravensburg	0
FC Augsburg	2
SG Wattenscheid	1
1. FC Heidenheim	2
FSV Frankfurt	1
VfL Wolfsburg	2
SV Babelsberg	0
SC Freiburg	4
SC Paderborn	1
SV Sandhausen	2
Viktoria Köln	1 (5)
1. FC Nürnberg (p)	1 (6)
FC 08 Villingen	1
Schalke 04	4
Sportfreunde Lotte	2
Werder Bremen	1
SC Hauenstein	1
Bayer Leverkusen	2
Würzburger Kickers (a.e.t.)	1
Eintracht Braunschweig	0
1860 Munich	2
Karlsruher SC	1
Eintracht Trier	0
Borussia Dortmund	3
MSV Duisburg	1
Union Berlin (a.e.t.)	2
VfB Lübeck	0
FC St. Pauli	3
Jahn Regensburg	1 (3)
Hertha BSC (p)	1 (5)

Second round 25–26 October 2016
Hallescher FC	0
Hamburger SV	4
1. FC Köln (a.e.t.)	2
1899 Hoffenheim	1
Greuther Fürth	2
Mainz 05	1
Borussia Mönchengladbach	2
VfB Stuttgart	0
Hannover 96	6
Fortuna Düsseldorf	1
Eintracht Frankfurt (p)	0 (4)
FC Ingolstadt	0 (1)
Astoria Walldorf	1
Darmstadt 98	0
Dynamo Dresden	0
Arminia Bielefeld	1
Bayern Munich	3
FC Augsburg	1
1. FC Heidenheim	0
VfL Wolfsburg	1
SC Freiburg	3 (3)
SV Sandhausen (p)	3 (4)
1. FC Nürnberg	2
Schalke 04	3
Sportfreunde Lotte (p)	2 (4)
Bayer Leverkusen	2 (3)
Würzburger Kickers	0 (3)
1860 Munich (p)	0 (4)
Borussia Dortmund (p)	1 (3)
Union Berlin	1 (0)
FC St. Pauli	0
Hertha BSC	2

Round of 16; 7–8 February 2017
Hamburger SV	2
1. FC Köln	0
Greuther Fürth	0
Borussia Mönchengladbach	2
Hannover 96	1
Eintracht Frankfurt	2
Astoria Walldorf	1 (4)
Arminia Bielefeld (p)	1 (5)
Bayern Munich	1
VfL Wolfsburg	0
SV Sandhausen	1
Schalke 04	4
Sportfreunde Lotte	2
1860 Munich	0
Borussia Dortmund (p)	1 (3)
Hertha BSC	1 (2)

Quarter-finals; 28 February – 1 March 2017
Hamburger SV	1
Borussia Mönchengladbach	2
Eintracht Frankfurt	1
Arminia Bielefeld	0
Bayern Munich	3
Schalke 04	0
Sportfreunde Lotte	0
Borussia Dortmund	3

Semi-finals; 25–26 April 2017
Borussia Mönchengladbach	1 (6)
Eintracht Frankfurt (p)	1 (7)
Bayern Munich	2
Borussia Dortmund	3

Final; 27 May 2017
Eintracht Frankfurt	1
Borussia Dortmund	2

== Top goalscorers ==
The following are the top scorers of the DFB-Pokal, sorted first by number of goals, and then alphabetically if necessary. Goals scored in penalty shoot-outs are not included.

Rank	Player	Team	Goals
1	(Poland) Robert Lewandowski	Bayern Munich	5
2	(Austria) Martin Harnik	Hannover 96	4
2	(United States) Bobby Wood	Hamburger SV	4
4	(Croatia) Antonio Čolak	Darmstadt 98	3
4	(Italy) Vincenzo Grifo	SC Freiburg	3
4	(Germany) Felix Klaus	Hannover 96	3
4	(Ukraine) Yevhen Konoplyanka	Schalke 04	3
4	(Croatia) Andrej Kramarić	1899 Hoffenheim	3
9	28 players		2
