= 2011–12 Regionalliga =

4th season of the Regionalliga

Regionalliga
- Season: 2011–12
- Champions: Hallescher FC (N); Borussia Dortmund II (W); Stuttgarter Kickers (S)
- Relegated: Karlsruher SC II

The 2011–12 Regionalliga season was the eighteenth season of the Regionalliga since its re-establishment after German reunification and the fourth as a fourth-level league within the German football league system. It was contested in three regional divisions.

The season began on 8 August 2011 and ended on 20 May 2012.

The champions of each division was promoted to the 2012–13 3. Liga. This tier of the German league pyramid was expanded to five divisions for the 2012–13 season. No team was relegated to a lower level on competitionally aspects at the end of the season.

== Teams ==
Locations of teams in the 2011–12 Regionalliga
Legend: Red: North, Blue: West, Green: South

A total of 55 teams will compete in three geographical divisions (North, West and South); the North and South circuits will comprise 18 sides each, while the West division was expanded to 19 teams.

=== Licensing issues prior to the season ===
The composition of the three divisions was severely affected by licensing difficulties for multiple teams. Rot Weiss Ahlen were demoted from the 3. Liga at the end of its 2010–11 season after going into administration. Subsequently, Ahlen did not apply for a Regionalliga licence due to their financial situation, with the club aiming to participate in the fifth-tier NRW-Liga instead.

Insufficient funding was also the key problem for another 3. Liga club as TuS Koblenz were forced to withdraw their participation in the 2011–12 season of the league several weeks after the last 2010–11 matches had been played. Koblenz then applied for a Regionalliga licence; however, it was not possible to determine in a legally binding way if the application was made in time. In order to avoid any disadvantages, the German FA hence admitted both Koblenz and TSV Havelse to the league; Havelse were originally relegated at the end of the 2010–11 Regionalliga season, but would have benefitted of a possible application rejection for Koblenz.

Several eligible teams from the fifth-tier Oberliga turned down promotion as well, usually because of inability to fulfil the requirements for a Regionalliga licence. These teams include the champions and runners-up of the North division of the NOFV-Oberliga, Torgelower SV Greif and Hansa Rostock II, NRW-Liga runners-up Germania Windeck and Bayernliga champions FC Ismaning.

=== Relegation and promotion ===
The three division champions of the 2010–11 Regionalliga season, Chemnitzer FC, Preußen Münster and Darmstadt 98 were promoted to the 2011–12 3. Liga. In turn, only one of the originally three relegated teams from the 3. Liga, Bayern Munich II, entered the league after both Wacker Burghausen and Werder Bremen II were spared from relegation because of the financial problems in Ahlen and Koblenz. The Bayern reserves were classified into the South division.

A total of six teams were relegated at the end of the 2010–11 season. Eintracht Braunschweig II, FC Oberneuland and Türkiyemspor Berlin from the North division, FC Homburg and Arminia Bielefeld II from the West division, and SV Wehen Wiesbaden II from the South division returned to their respective fifth-level league. A further two teams, SSV Ulm 1846 and SpVgg Weiden, had to withdraw in the middle of the season after going into administration and thus were automatically demoted. Ulm returned to the fifth tier in 2011–12, while Weiden was dissolved shortly thereafter; their successor club began play at the sixth tier for the 2011–12 season.

Ten teams were promoted from the fifth-level leagues. Oberliga Niedersachsen champions SV Meppen, Oberliga Hamburg winners FC St. Pauli II, NOFV-Oberliga South division champions Germania Halberstadt and third-placed NOFV-Oberliga North division sides Berlin AK 07 were entered into the Regionalliga North, with the latter benefitting of both Torgelower SV Greif and Hansa Rostock II foregoing promotion. NRW-Liga winners Rot-Weiss Essen, third-placed team Fortuna Köln (as runners-up Germania Windeck chose to withdraw from the league at the end of the season) and Oberliga Südwest champions SC Idar-Oberstein were admitted into the Regionalliga West. Finally, Hessenliga champions Bayern Alzenau, Oberliga Baden-Württemberg winners Waldhof Mannheim and Bayernliga runners-up FC Ingolstadt 04 II (as champions FC Ismaning did not obtain a Regionalliga licence) were promoted to the Regionalliga South.

== League reform ==
=== Origins ===
The German league system, having gone through its last adjustment in 2008, when the 3. Liga was established and the number of Regionalligas increased from two to three, required another adjustment by 2011. The reason for this was the large number of insolvencies on the fourth level, caused by high cost and infrastructure requirements while, at the same time, the clubs at this level complaint about low incomes and little interest from TV broadcasters. Requirements like the fact that Regionalliga stadiums had to have at least 1,000 seats and a separate stand with separate entrance for away spectators were seen as causing to much of a financial strain on amateur clubs. Many clubs also struggled to cope with the 400-pages long license application, having to rely on volunteers rather than being able draw on permanent staff.

This led to Oberliga champions even, at times, declining their right for promotion to avoid the financial risk the Regionalliga meant to them, breaking with a basic principle of German football, that league champions would almost always be promoted.

In a special conference of the German Football Association, the DFB, in October 2010, 223 of 253 delegates voted for a reform of the league system on the fourth level. The number of Regionalligas was to be expanded to five, with the reestablishing of the Regionalliga Nordost, the formation of the Regionalliga Bayern and a shift of the Regionalliga Süd to the new Regionalliga Süd/Südwest.

The suggestion for the league reform had come from Bavaria, where, in a meeting of the Bavarian top-level amateur clubs at Wendelstein, the financial survival of the leagues and clubs in the current system was questioned. It resulted in the publication of what was called the Wendelsteiner Anstoß, which demanded a clear demarcation between professional football on the first three tiers of German football and amateur football below that. For this purpose, the paper also demanded a reestablishment of the German amateur football championship as an incentive and goal for top amateur clubs who did not want to turn professional.

=== Qualifying ===
The new leagues will nominally be playing with 18 clubs (expect Regionalliga Nordost with 16), however, in its first, transitional season the DFB will permit up to 22 clubs in the league. Restrictions exist on reserve sides. No more than seven reserve teams are permitted per Regionalliga, should there be more in a league the additional ones would have to be moved to a different Regionalliga. Reserve teams of 3. Liga clubs are not permitted to play in the Regionalliga. The make up of the clubs entering the new Regionalligas from the leagues below was left to the regional football association and not regulated by the DFB.

One exception to the geographical alignment will be the Bavarian club FC Bayern Alzenau, traditionally playing in Hesse's league system, which will be grouped in the new Regionalliga Süd/Südwest, upon their own request, rather than in the Regionalliga Bayern.

== Regionalliga Nord (North) ==
The North division will comprises eighteen teams for the 2011–12 season.

=== League table ===
Pos	Team	Pld	W	D	L	GF	GA	GD	Pts	Promotion
1	Hallescher FC (C, P)	34	23	8	3	53	15	+38	77	Promotion to 3. Liga
2	Holstein Kiel	34	24	3	7	73	31	+42	75	
3	RB Leipzig	34	22	7	5	71	29	+42	73	
4	TSV Havelse	34	14	9	11	54	46	+8	51	
5	VfL Wolfsburg II	34	14	8	12	51	41	+10	50	
6	Hannover 96 II	34	14	8	12	47	48	−1	50	
7	Berliner AK 07	34	14	5	15	48	47	+1	47	
8	Hamburger SV II	34	13	6	15	56	47	+9	45	
9	ZFC Meuselwitz	34	12	9	13	41	52	−11	45	
10	VFC Plauen	34	10	13	11	46	50	−4	43	
11	VfB Lübeck	34	10	8	16	41	47	−6	38	
12	SV Meppen	34	10	8	16	38	56	−18	38	
13	SV Wilhelmshaven	34	12	7	15	57	64	−7	37 (Note: SV Wilhelmshaven were deducted six points.)	
14	Hertha BSC II	34	10	7	17	38	58	−20	37	
15	Energie Cottbus II	34	9	9	16	39	65	−26	36	
16	Germania Halberstadt	34	8	10	16	45	53	−8	34	
17	FC St. Pauli II	34	8	8	18	43	72	−29	32	
18	1. FC Magdeburg	34	5	14	15	23	43	−20	29	

Source: kicker
Rules for classification: 1) points; 2) goal difference; 3) number of goals scored.
(C) Champions; (P) Promoted

=== Top goalscorers ===
Source: kicker (German)

22 goals

- (Germany) Daniel Frahn (RB Leipzig)

17 goals

- (Republic of the Congo) Francky Sembolo (SV Wilhelmshaven)

13 goals

- (Poland) Jarosław Lindner (Holstein Kiel)

12 goals

- (Germany) Christian Beck (Germania Halberstadt)

11 goals

- (Germany) Lars Fuchs (Hannover 96 II)
- (Turkey) Deniz Kadah (VfB Lübeck)
- (Germany) Stefan Kutschke (RB Leipzig)

10 goals

- (Germany) Andy Hebler (Energie Cottbus II)
- (Germany) Marc Heider (Holstein Kiel)
- (Germany) Michael Holt (SV Meppen)

9 goals

- (Germany) Fousseni Alassani (FC St. Pauli II)

=== Stadiums and locations ===
Stadium	Location	Club
AWD-Arena	Hannover	Hannover 96 II
Red Bull Arena	Leipzig	RB Leipzig
MDCC-Arena	Magdeburg	1. FC Magdeburg
Kurt-Wabbel-Stadion	Halle	Hallescher FC
Millerntor-Stadion	Hamburg	FC St. Pauli II
Stadion der Freundschaft	Cottbus	Energie Cottbus II
Lohmühle	Lübeck	VfB Lübeck
VfL-Stadion am Elsterweg	Wolfsburg	VfL Wolfsburg II
MEP-Arena	Meppen	SV Meppen
Sternquell-Arena	Plauen	VFC Plauen
Holstein-Stadion	Kiel	Holstein Kiel
Poststadion	Berlin	Berlin AK 07
Jadestadion	Wilhelmshaven	SV Wilhelmshaven
Friedensstadion	Halberstadt	VfB Germania Halberstadt
Olympiapark Amateurstadion	Berlin	Hertha BSC II
bluechip-Arena	Meuselwitz	ZFC Meuselwitz
Edmund-Plambeck-Stadion	Norderstedt	Hamburger SV II
Wilhelm-Langrehr-Stadion	Garbsen	TSV Havelse

== Regionalliga West ==
The West division comprises nineteen teams for the 2011–12 season.

=== League table ===
Pos	Team	Pld	W	D	L	GF	GA	GD	Pts	Promotion
1	Borussia Dortmund II (C, P)	36	24	5	7	84	39	+45	77	Promotion to 3. Liga
2	Sportfreunde Lotte	36	22	10	4	64	31	+33	76	
3	Borussia Mönchengladbach II	36	21	6	9	67	45	+22	69	
4	Eintracht Trier	36	19	7	10	57	34	+23	64	
5	Wuppertaler SV Borussia	36	16	9	11	68	49	+19	57	
6	1. FC Köln II	36	15	11	10	59	48	+11	56	
7	Fortuna Köln	36	15	8	13	54	56	−2	53	
8	Rot-Weiss Essen	36	15	7	14	52	57	−5	52	
9	1. FC Kaiserslautern II	36	13	12	11	56	55	+1	51	
10	SC Verl	36	13	7	16	39	48	−9	46	
11	FC Schalke 04 II	36	13	6	17	55	63	−8	45	
12	1. FSV Mainz 05 II	36	12	7	17	49	47	+2	43	
13	SV Elversberg	36	11	9	16	39	60	−21	42	
14	VfL Bochum II	36	11	8	17	42	64	−22	41	
15	SC Wiedenbrück 2000	36	10	10	16	44	52	−8	40	
16	SC Idar-Oberstein	36	10	9	17	38	62	−24	39	
17	Bayer Leverkusen II	36	7	10	19	34	57	−23	31	
18	TuS Koblenz	36	6	13	17	32	51	−19	31	
19	Fortuna Düsseldorf II	36	5	14	17	39	54	−15	29	

Source: kicker
Rules for classification: 1) points; 2) goal difference; 3) number of goals scored.
(C) Champions; (P) Promoted

=== Top goalscorers ===
Source: kicker (German)

30 goals

- (Germany) Christian Knappmann (Wuppertaler SV Borussia)

20 goals

- (United States) Andrew Wooten (1. FC Kaiserslautern II)

16 goals

- (United States) Terrence Boyd (Borussia Dortmund II)

15 goals

- (Italy) Silvio Pagano (Fortuna Köln)

14 goals

- (Germany) Marcus Fischer (Sportfreunde Lotte)

12 goals

- (Germany) Kevin Freiberger (VfL Bochum II)
- (Germany) Elias Kachunga (Borussia Mönchengladbach II)

11 goals

- (Germany) Erik Durm (1. FSV Mainz 05 II)

10 goals

- (Germany) Ahmet Kulabas (Eintracht Trier)

9 goals

- (Germany) Thiemo-Jérôme Kialka (1. FC Köln II)
- (Germany) Marco Königs (Fortuna Düsseldorf II)
- (Germany) Mark Uth (1. FC Köln II)
- (Cambodia) Chhunly Pagenburg (Eintracht Trier)

=== Stadiums and locations ===
Name	Location	Club
Fritz-Walter-Stadion	Kaiserslautern	1. FC Kaiserslautern II
Stadion Rote Erde	Dortmund	Borussia Dortmund II
Stadion am Zoo	Wuppertal	Wuppertaler SV Borussia
Stadion am Bruchweg	Mainz	1. FSV Mainz 05 II
Lohrheidestadion	Bochum-Wattenscheid	VfL Bochum II
Georg-Melches-Stadion	Essen	Rot-Weiss Essen
Stadion Oberwerth	Koblenz	TuS Koblenz
Südstadion	Köln	SC Fortuna Köln
Mondpalast-Arena	Herne	FC Schalke 04 II
Moselstadion	Trier	Eintracht Trier
Grenzlandstadion	Mönchengladbach	Borussia Mönchengladbach II
Paul-Janes-Stadion	Düsseldorf	Fortuna Düsseldorf II
Waldstadion an der Kaiserlinde	Elversberg	SV Elversberg
Stadion Im Haag	Idar-Oberstein	SC Idar-Oberstein
SolarTechnics-Arena	Lotte	Sportfreunde Lotte
Franz-Kremer-Stadion	Köln	1. FC Köln II
Stadion an der Poststraße	Verl	SC Verl
Jahnstadion	Rheda-Wiedenbrück	SC Wiedenbrück 2000
Ulrich-Haberland-Stadion	Leverkusen	Bayer 04 Leverkusen II

== Regionalliga Süd (South) ==
The South division will comprise eighteen teams for the 2011–12 season.

=== League table ===
Pos	Team	Pld	W	D	L	GF	GA	GD	Pts	Promotion or relegation
1	Stuttgarter Kickers (C, P)	34	23	9	2	66	29	+37	78	Promotion to 3. Liga
2	SG Sonnenhof Großaspach	34	21	6	7	78	40	+38	69	
3	Eintracht Frankfurt II	34	21	4	9	69	41	+28	67	
4	Wormatia Worms	34	16	10	8	57	48	+9	58	
5	Karlsruher SC II (R)	34	18	4	12	56	48	+8	58	Relegation to Oberliga (Note: Karlsruher SC II ineligible for the 2012–13 Regionalliga because of the relegation of the first team to the 3. Liga.)
6	SpVgg Greuther Fürth II	34	15	9	10	50	48	+2	54	
7	1899 Hoffenheim II	34	15	7	12	69	36	+33	52	
8	SC Freiburg II	34	15	4	15	49	49	0	49	
9	FC Ingolstadt 04 II	34	15	4	15	46	50	−4	49	
10	1. FC Nuremberg II	34	11	11	12	59	54	+5	44	
11	Hessen Kassel	34	12	6	16	43	54	−11	42	
12	Waldhof Mannheim	34	10	9	15	40	46	−6	39	
13	1860 Munich II	34	10	8	16	28	52	−24	38	
14	Bayern Munich II	34	8	10	16	43	54	−11	34	
15	FC Memmingen	34	7	12	15	37	54	−17	33	
16	SC Pfullendorf	34	8	9	17	40	65	−25	33	
17	FSV Frankfurt II	34	8	4	22	45	70	−25	28	
18	Bayern Alzenau	34	6	8	20	39	76	−37	26	

Source: kicker
Rules for classification: 1) points; 2) goal difference; 3) number of goals scored.
(C) Champions; (P) Promoted; (R) Relegated

=== Top goalscorers ===
Source: kicker (German)

16 goals

- (Germany) Karl-Heinz Lappe (FC Ingolstadt 04 II)

12 goals

- (Germany) Nicolai Groß (1899 Hoffenheim II)
- (Italy) Nicolo Mazzola (SG Sonnenhof Großaspach)
- (Italy) Elia Soriano (Eintracht Frankfurt II)

11 goals

- (Germany) Michael Schürg (Wormatia Worms)

10 goals

- (Albania) Ilir Azemi (SpVgg Greuther Fürth II)
- (Albania) Sokol Kacani (SG Sonnenhof Großaspach)

9 goals

- (Germany) Vllaznim Dautaj (Waldhof Mannheim)
- (Germany) Kai Herdling (1899 Hoffenheim II)
- (Germany) Andreas Mayer (Hessen Kassel)
- (Germany) Stefan Müller (FC Ingolstadt 04 II)
- (Germany) Peter Sprung (Bayern Alzenau)

=== Stadiums and locations ===
Name	Location	Club
Easycredit-Stadion	Nürnberg	1. FC Nürnberg II
Wildparkstadion	Karlsruhe	Karlsruher SC II
Carl-Benz-Stadion	Mannheim	SV Waldhof Mannheim
Möslestadion	Freiburg	SC Freiburg II
Auestadion	Kassel	KSV Hessen Kassel
Trolli Arena	Fürth	SpVgg Greuther Fürth II
Gazi-Stadion auf der Waldau	Stuttgart	Stuttgarter Kickers
Tuja-Stadion	Ingolstadt	FC Ingolstadt 04 II
Frankfurter Volksbank Stadion	Frankfurt	Eintracht Frankfurt II; FSV Frankfurt II
Städtisches Stadion an der Grünwalder Straße	München	FC Bayern München II; TSV 1860 München II
Geberit-Arena	Pfullendorf	SC Pfullendorf
comtech Arena	Aspach	SG Sonnenhof Großaspach
Dietmar-Hopp-Stadion	Sinsheim	TSG 1899 Hoffenheim II
Wormatia-Stadion	Worms	Wormatia Worms
Memminger Arena	Memmingen	FC Memmingen
Städtisches Stadion am Prischoß	Alzenau	FC Bayern Alzenau
