= Simon Köpf =

German footballer

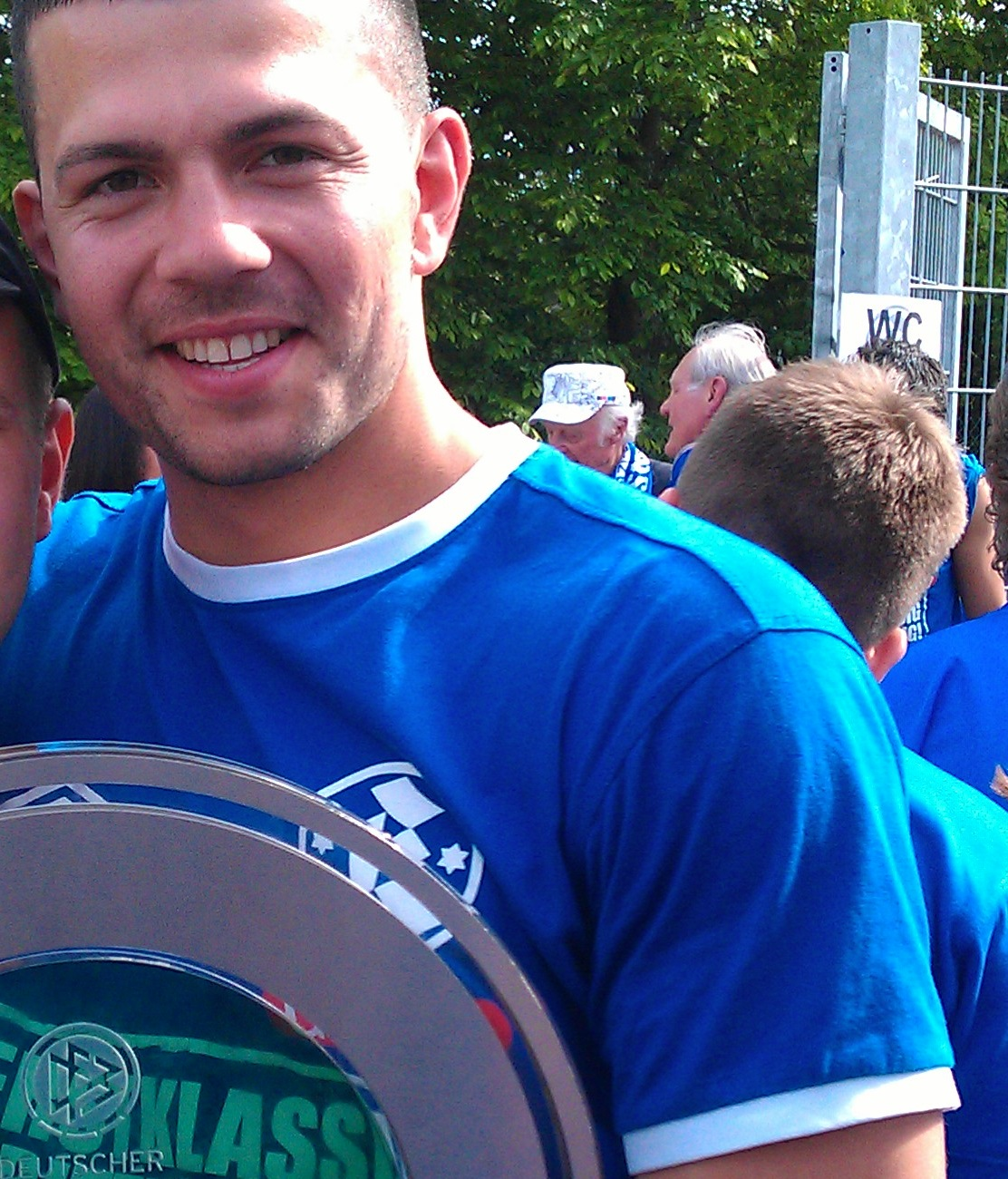

Personal information
- Date of birth: March 25, 1987 (age 39)
- Place of birth: Schwäbisch Gmünd, West Germany
- Position: Centre back

Team information
- Current team: TSV Essingen (manager)

Youth career
- SSV Aalen
- VfB Stuttgart
- VfL Iggingen
- 1997–2005: 1. FC Normannia Gmünd
- 2005–2006: SSV Ulm 1846

Senior career*
Years	Team	Apps	(Gls)
2006–2009	VfR Aalen	23	(1)
2008–2009	VfR Aalen II	9	(0)
2009–2013	Stuttgarter Kickers	69	(2)
2013–2018	TSV Essingen		

Managerial career
- 2019–2022: TSV Essingen (assistant)
- 2022–: TSV Essingen
- * Club domestic league appearances and goals

Simon Köpf (born March 25, 1987) is a retired German footballer who played as a central defender and current manager of TSV Essingen.

== Career ==
Köpf began his career with VfR Aalen, and made his debut in March 2007, when he replaced Dennis Hillebrand in a Regionalliga Süd match against Bayern Munich II. He made a further four appearances in the 2006–07 season, and eighteen the following year as Aalen qualified for the new 3. Liga. After failing to make a first-team appearance in the first half of the season, he signed for Stuttgarter Kickers in January 2009, for whom he made nine appearances but was unable to prevent the club being relegated (along with Aalen). He made 43 appearances over the next two seasons, but missed almost the entire 2011–12 season due to injury: he only made one appearance, as a substitute for Vincenzo Marchese in the last minute of the season, as Kickers celebrated the Regionalliga Süd title with a 2–0 win against Bayern Munich II. He was released by Kickers in July 2013 and signed for TSV Essingen.

== Coaching career ==
Retiring at the end of 2018, Köpf was immediately hired as the assistant manager of TSV Essingen. On 10 March 2022 Köpf appointed as head coach on a temporary basis until the end of the season. However, he continued in the same position prior to the 2022-23 season.
