= Alfred Kaminski =

German football manager

Personal information
- Date of birth: 26 February 1964 (age 62)
- Place of birth: Mölln, West Germany
- Height: 1.79 m (5 ft 10 in)

Managerial career
- Years: Team
- 1998: SV Eichede (assistant)
- 1998–1999: SV Eichede
- 2000–2002: FC Dornbreite
- 2002–2004: Möllner SV
- 2006: 1. FC Saarbrücken (assistant)
- 2007: 1. FC Saarbrücken II
- 2008: 1. FC Saarbrücken
- 2008–2009: SV Elversberg (dir. of football)
- 2010: FC 08 Homburg (dir. of football)
- 2010: FC 08 Homburg
- 2012–2013: VfR Aalen (scout/analyst)
- 2014–2015: Kickers Offenbach (dir. of sports)
- 2015–2016: Stuttgarter Kickers (assistant)
- 2015: Stuttgarter Kickers (caretaker)
- 2016: Stuttgarter Kickers
- 2018: SG Barockstadt Fulda-Lehnerz

Alfred Kaminski (born 26 February 1964) is a German football manager.

== Career ==
After 20 years working as a customs officer, Kaminski became a football manager. He received a German Football Association manager license in 2005, and joined 1. FC Saarbrücken as an assistant manager to Michael Henke in 2006.
