= Uğur Yılmaz =

Turkish-German footballer

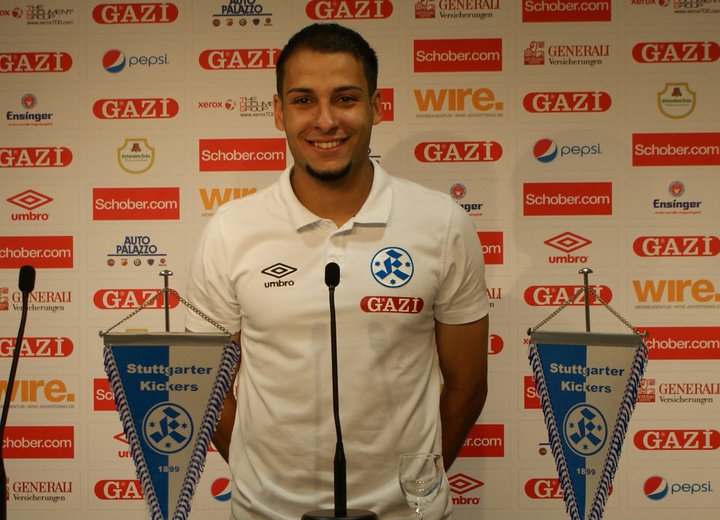
- Yılmaz in 2011

Personal information
- Date of birth: 1 October 1987 (age 39)
- Place of birth: Stuttgart, West Germany
- Position: Forward

Team information
- Current team: GSV Maichingen

Youth career
- TSG Backnang
- SpVgg Feuerbach
- TSV Münster
- Stuttgarter Kickers
- TSG Backnang

Senior career*
Years	Team	Apps	(Gls)
2006–2007	SV Böblingen		(12)
2007–2010	SV Bonlanden		(19)
2010–2012	Stuttgarter Kickers II	23	(5)
2010–2012	Stuttgarter Kickers	34	(9)
2012–2013	FV Illertissen	22	(9)
2013	Kartalspor	2	(0)
2013	Anadolu Selçukluspor	0	(0)
2013–2014	TSV Rain am Lech	25	(8)
2014–	GSV Maichingen		
- * Club domestic league appearances and goals as of 27 September 2015

Uğur Yılmaz (born 1 October 1987) is a Turkish-German footballer who plays for GSV Maichingen.
