= Mahir Savranlıoğlu =

Turkish footballer

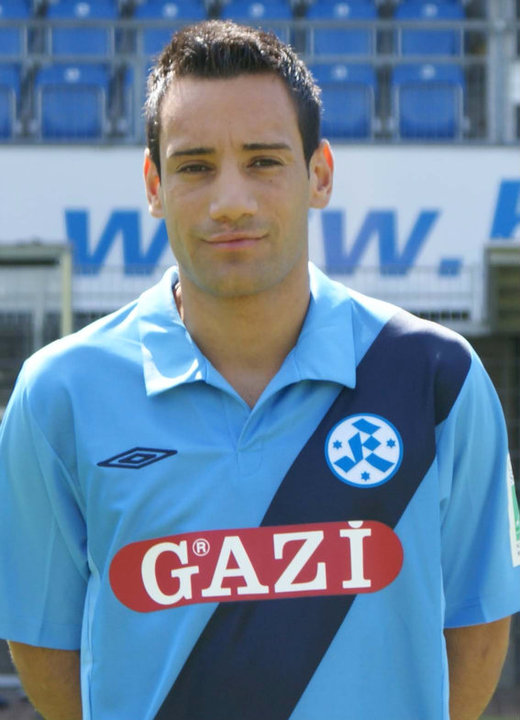
- Savranlıoğlu in 2013

Personal information
- Date of birth: August 7, 1986 (age 40)
- Place of birth: Herrenberg, West Germany
- Height: 1.81 m (5 ft 11 1/2 in)
- Position: Left midfielder

Team information
- Current team: SGV Freiberg
- Number: 10

Youth career
- ASV Rexingen
- –2004: SSV Reutlingen 05

Senior career*
Years	Team	Apps	(Gls)
2004–2006	TuS Ergenzingen		
2006–2007	KFC Uerdingen 05	30	(0)
2007–2008	FC Gütersloh	30	(0)
2008–2009	FC Schalke 04 II	14	(0)
2009–2012	Stuttgarter Kickers II	8	(3)
2009–2014	Stuttgarter Kickers	112	(3)
2015–	SGV Freiberg	22	(0)
- * Club domestic league appearances and goals as of 17 September 2015

Mahir Savranlıoğlu (born August 7, 1986) is a Turkish footballer who plays for SGV Freiberg.
