= Kai-Bastian Evers =

German footballer

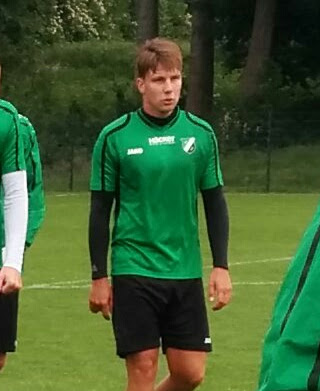
- Evers in 2015

Personal information
- Date of birth: 5 May 1990 (age 36)
- Place of birth: Lünen, West Germany
- Height: 1.80 m (5 ft 11 in)
- Positions: Defensive midfielder; centre-back

Team information
- Current team: SF Ostinghausen

Youth career
- Preußen Lünen
- –2009: Borussia Dortmund

Senior career*
Years	Team	Apps	(Gls)
2009–2010	Borussia Dortmund II	16	(0)
2010–2011	SV Babelsberg	25	(1)
2011–2012	Sportfreunde Lotte	7	(0)
2012–2014	Stuttgarter Kickers	25	(0)
2012–2014	→ Stuttgarter Kickers II	12	(0)
2014–2016	SV Rödinghausen	51	(1)
2016–2018	Schwarz-Weiß Rehden	60	(5)
2019–2020	VfB Oldenburg	46	(1)
2020–2022	SV Lippstadt	68	(2)
2022–2023	KFC Uerdingen	34	(5)
2023–	SF Ostinghausen	0	(0)

International career
- Germany U-17
- * Club domestic league appearances and goals as of 08:15, 1 July 2023 (UTC)

Kai-Bastian Evers (born 5 May 1990) is a German footballer who plays for SF Ostinghausen.

== Career ==
In the summer 2019, Evers joined VfB Oldenburg on a two-year deal.
