= Omar Jatta =

Gambian footballer

Personal information
- Date of birth: 1 January 1989 (age 37)
- Place of birth: Brikama, Gambia
- Position: Striker

Youth career
- –2009: Hawks Banjul

Senior career*
Years	Team	Apps	(Gls)
2009–2011	FV Ravensburg		
2011–2014	Stuttgarter Kickers	15	(1)
- * Club domestic league appearances and goals as of 31 January 2014

Omar Jatta (born 1 January 1989) is a Gambian footballer who is currently playing for FC 08 Villingen.
