= Marcel Ivanusa =

Slovenian footballer

Personal information
- Date of birth: 16 January 1985 (age 41)
- Place of birth: Ptuj, Yugoslavia
- Position: Defensive midfielder

Team information
- Current team: 1. FC Köln II (assistant manager)

Youth career
- –2004: Stuttgarter Kickers

Senior career*
Years	Team	Apps	(Gls)
2004–2010	Stuttgarter Kickers II	147	(18)
2009–2014	Stuttgarter Kickers	105	(16)
2015–2017	SGV Freiberg	22	(7)

Managerial career
- 2017-2018: SpVgg Ludwigsburg 07
- 2019-2022: SGV Freiberg (assistant)
- 2022-2023: SG Sonnenhof Großaspach (assistant)
- 2023-: 1. FC Köln II (assistant)
- * Club domestic league appearances and goals

Marcel Ivanusa (born 16 January 1985) is a Slovenian retired footballer who played the majority of his career for Stuttgarter Kickers.

He is the assistant manager at 1. FC Köln II.
