= Fritz Millinger =

German footballer

Personal information
- Date of birth: 19 September 1935
- Date of death: 22 May 2021 (aged 85)
- Place of death: Eislingen, Baden-Württemberg, Germany

Managerial career
- Years: Team
- 1966–1967: VfB Stuttgart (assistant)
- c.1968–1970: TSG Backnang
- 1972?–1973: Normannia Gmünd
- 1973–1974: Stuttgarter Kickers
- 1974: VfB Stuttgart
- 1978–1979: Heidenheimer SB 1846
- 1987–1988: Göppinger SV

Fritz Millinger (19 September 1935 – 22 May 2021) was a German football defender and later manager.
