= Julian Leist =

German footballer

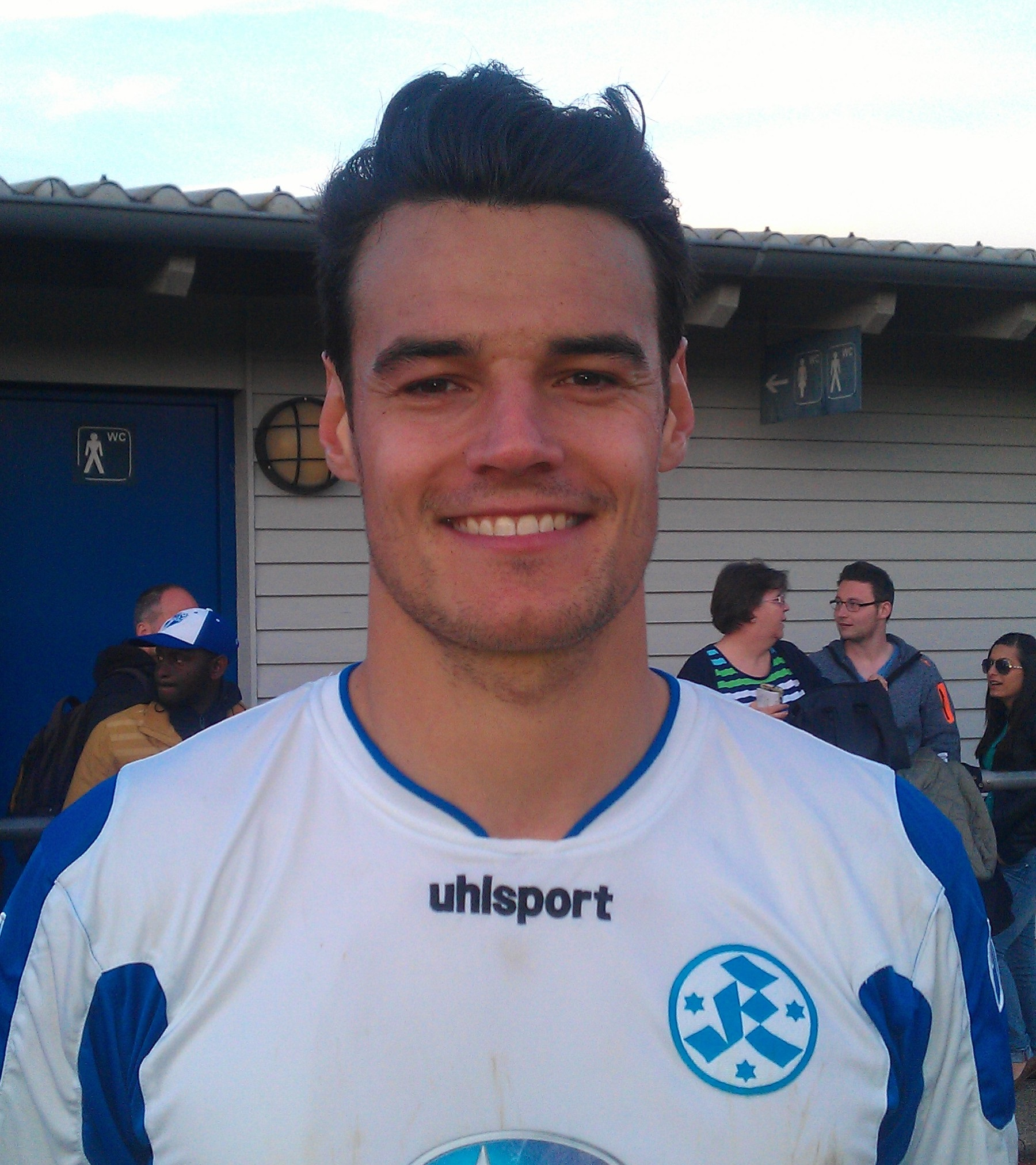
- Leist with Stuttgarter Kickers

Personal information
- Date of birth: 11 March 1988 (age 38)
- Place of birth: Stuttgart, West Germany
- Height: 1.92 m (6 ft 4 in)
- Position: Defender

Team information
- Current team: Stuttgarter Kickers (assistant coach)

Youth career
- 1997–2002: TSV Steinhaldenfeld
- 2002–2005: Stuttgarter Kickers

Senior career*
| Years | Team | Apps | (Gls) |
| 2006–2008 | Stuttgarter Kickers II | 35 | (1) |
| 2008–2010 | 1860 München II | 57 | (2) |
| 2010–2011 | Bayern Munich II | 31 | (0) |
| 2011–2014 | Stuttgarter Kickers | 89 | (8) |
| 2014–2021 | Sonnenhof Großaspach | 227 | (7) |
| 2021–2022 | Stuttgarter Kickers | 11 | (0) |

Managerial career
- 2022–: Stuttgarter Kickers (assistant)
- * Club domestic league appearances and goals

Julian Leist (born 11 March 1988) is a German football coach and a former player. He is an assistant coach with Stuttgarter Kickers.

== Career ==
Leist, a defender, joined Bayern Munich II in 2010, having previously played for the reserve teams of TSV 1860 München and Stuttgarter Kickers. He made his debut in the opening match of the 2010–11 season, a 1–0 defeat against SV Babelsberg. He was released by Bayern in June 2011 after the reserve team were relegated from the 3. Liga and returned to Stuttgarter Kickers to play for the first team. In his first after returning to Kickers, he helped the club win the Regionalliga Süd and return to the 3. Liga. In July 2014, he left the club for a second time, joining newly promoted 3. Liga side SG Sonnenhof Großaspach.
