= SSV Aalen =

German football club

- Full name: Spiel- und Sportverein Aalen 1901 e.V.
- League: Kreisklasse Kocher/Rems A2 (IX)
- 2014–15: Kreisliga Kocher/Rems B3 (X), 2nd ↑
Home colours	Away colours

SSV Aalen is a German football club from the city of Aalen, Baden-Württemberg. It is part of a larger sports club with a membership of approximately 900 and in addition to its football side has departments for athletics, basketball, jazz dance, gymnastics, tennis and disabled sport.

== History ==
The footballers progressed as high as the third tier Amateurliga Nordwürttemberg where they played the 1961–62 season. The finished in 16th place alongside local rival VfR Aalen which led to the relegation of both sides.

Aalen is a centre for disabled sport in Württemberg and the state Mehrkampf Championships have been staged in SSV-Stadion. As early as 1947 the club served people injured in World War II. The program was opened up in the 1960s to other disabled persons and in 1991 became a separate section within the club known as Behinderten- und Versehrtensportgemeinschaft.

The club played in the tier ten Kreisliga B Kocher/Rems B3 as a lower table side until 2015 when a second place and success in the relegation round meant promotion to the Kreisliga A for the first time in 30 years.
