= Jérôme Gondorf =

German footballer

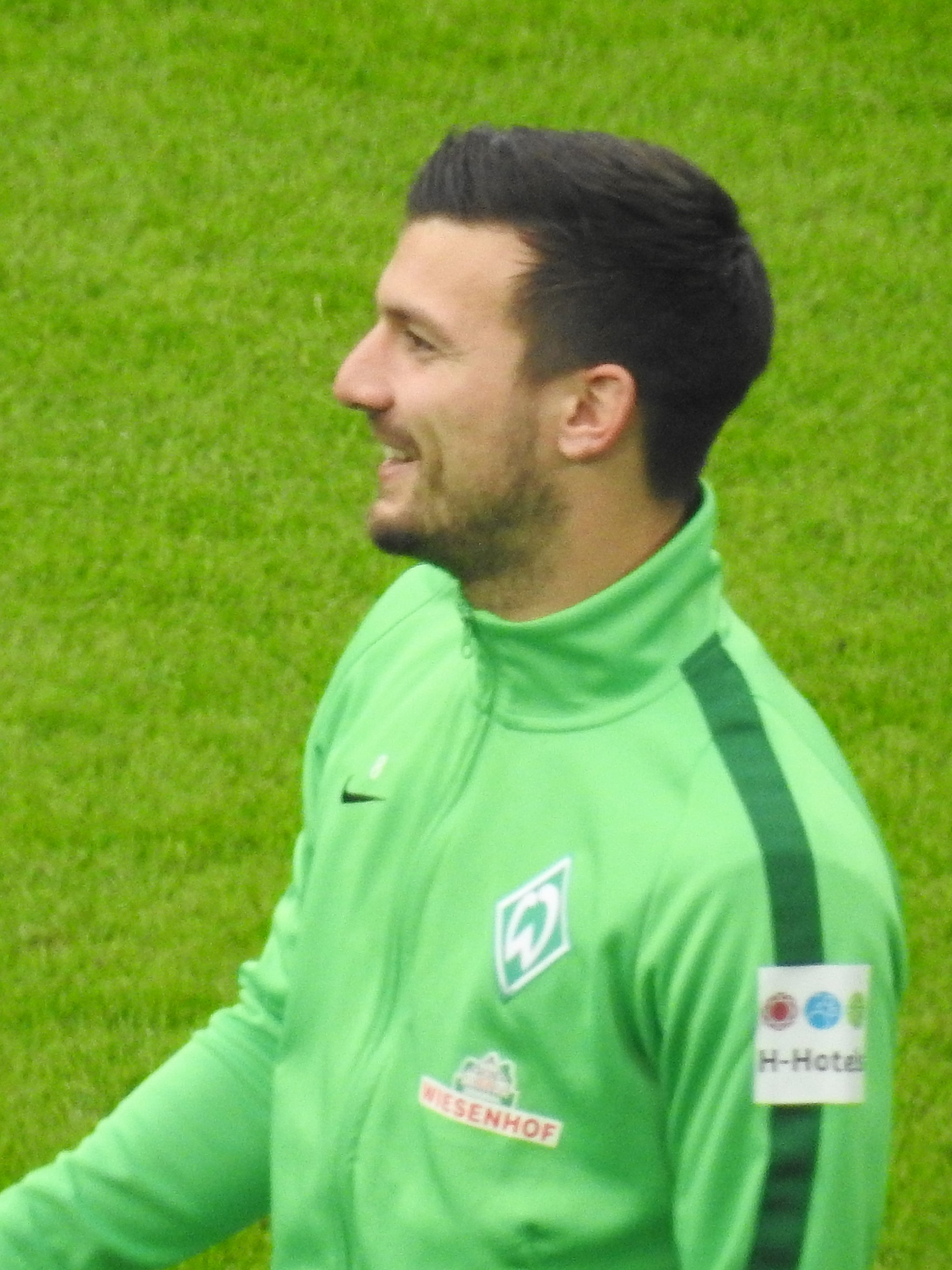
- Gondorf training with Werder Bremen in 2017

Personal information
- Date of birth: 26 June 1988 (age 38)
- Place of birth: Karlsruhe, West Germany
- Height: 1.75 m (5 ft 9 in)
- Position: Central midfielder

Youth career
- Karlsruher SC
- TSV Palmbach
- –2008: SV Spielberg

Senior career*
Years	Team	Apps	(Gls)
2008–2010	ASV Durlach	43	(4)
2010	Stuttgarter Kickers II	4	(1)
2010–2013	Stuttgarter Kickers	74	(10)
2013–2017	Darmstadt 98	127	(11)
2017–2018	Werder Bremen	21	(1)
2018–2020	SC Freiburg	27	(2)
2020	→ Karlsruher SC (loan)	15	(2)
2020–2024	Karlsruher SC	122	(7)
- * Club domestic league appearances and goals

Jérôme Gondorf (born 26 June 1988) is a German former professional footballer who played as central midfielder.

== Career ==
Having previously played for Stuttgarter Kickers from 2010 until 2013, Gondorf joined 3. Liga club Darmstadt in 2013 on a two-year contract. With Darmstadt, he achieved back-to-back promotions in 2014 and 2015. In July 2016, he agreed to a contract extension until 2018.

In May 2017, Gondorf signed with Werder Bremen. Werder Bremen reportedly activated a release clause in his contract with Darmstadt by paying a transfer fee of €1.2 million.

In June 2018, SC Freiburg announced Gondorf would join for the 2018–19 season after spending one season at Werder Bremen. The undisclosed transfer fee was estimated at €1.3 million.

On 15 January 2020, Gondorf was loaned out to Karlsruher SC for the rest of the 2019–20 season. Gondorf played 15 games, scored two goals and made two assists, before the club signed him permanently, giving him a contract until the summer 2022. Gondorf was also handed the captains armband, which he took over from David Pisot.

In February 2024 Gondorf announced he would retire in the summer.
