= Vincenzo Marchese =

Italian-German footballer

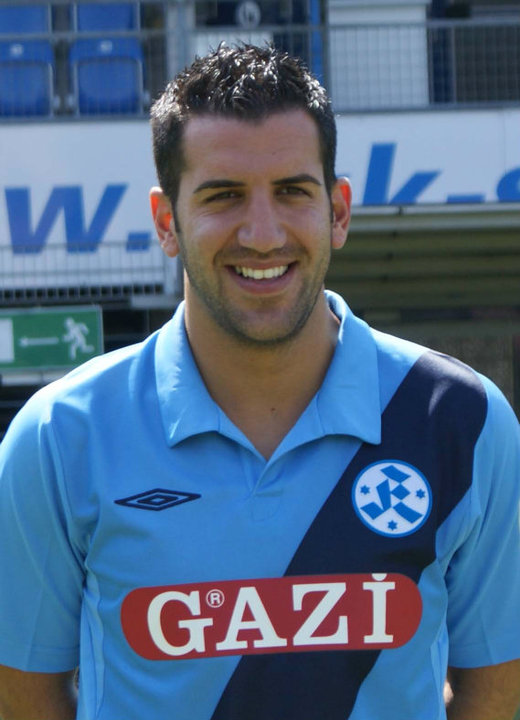
- Marchese in 2010

Personal information
- Date of birth: 19 May 1983 (age 43)
- Place of birth: Böblingen, West Germany
- Height: 1.74 m (5 ft 9 in)
- Position: Midfielder

Youth career
- VfL Sindelfingen
- SpVgg Weil im Schönbuch
- 2000–2002: Stuttgarter Kickers

Senior career*
Years	Team	Apps	(Gls)
2002–2006	Stuttgarter Kickers II	88	(14)
2003–2006	Stuttgarter Kickers	20	(0)
2006–2009	SSV Ulm	96	(26)
2009–2016	Stuttgarter Kickers	182	(38)
2016–2017	Atlético Baleares	11	(0)
Total		397	(78)
- * Club domestic league appearances and goals

Vincenzo Marchese (Italian pronunciation: [vinˈtʃɛntso marˈkeːze]; born 19 May 1983) is an Italian-German former professional footballer who played as a midfielder.
