= Peter Sprung =

German footballer

Personal information
- Date of birth: July 20, 1979 (age 47)
- Place of birth: Ruda Śląska, Poland
- Position: Striker

Team information
- Current team: Sportfreunde Seligenstadt
- Number: 9

Youth career
- –2000: SV Aschaffenburg-Damm
- 2000–2001: Sportfreunde Seligenstadt

Senior career*
Years	Team	Apps	(Gls)
2001–2003	Eintracht Frankfurt II		
2003–2007	SV Aschaffenburg-Damm		
2007–2008	Alemannia Haibach		
2008–2010	Viktoria Kahl		
2010–2012	FC Bayern Alzenau	61	(33)
2012–2013	Stuttgarter Kickers	21	(2)
2013	Viktoria Aschaffenburg	14	(8)
2013–	Sportfreunde Seligenstadt	10	(8)
- * Club domestic league appearances and goals as of September 10, 2013

Peter Sprung (born July 20, 1979) is a German footballer who currently plays for Sportfreunde Seligenstadt.
