= Thorben Stadler =

German footballer

Personal information
- Date of birth: 8 February 1990 (age 36)
- Place of birth: Leutershausen, West Germany
- Height: 1.80 m (5 ft 11 in)
- Position: Left-back

Team information
- Current team: 1.FC Mühlhausen
- Number: 10

Youth career
- 1994–1997: FV Leutersbach
- 1997–2004: TSG Weinheim 62/09
- 2004–2009: Karlsruher SC

Senior career*
Years	Team	Apps	(Gls)
2009–2012	Karlsruher SC II	48	(2)
2010–2012	Karlsruher SC	12	(1)
2012–2013	Stuttgarter Kickers	15	(0)
2013–2014	Jahn Regensburg	6	(0)
2014–2018	FC Astoria Walldorf	77	(5)
2018–	1.FC Mühlhausen	49	(35)

International career
	Germany U17	6	(0)
- * Club domestic league appearances and goals as of 10 February 2021

Thorben Stadler (born 8 February 1990) is a German footballer who is playing for 1.FC Mühlhausen. His former clubs include Karlsruher SC, Stuttgarter Kickers and SSV Jahn Regensburg.
