= Andreas Mayer (footballer, born 1980) =

German footballer (born 1980)

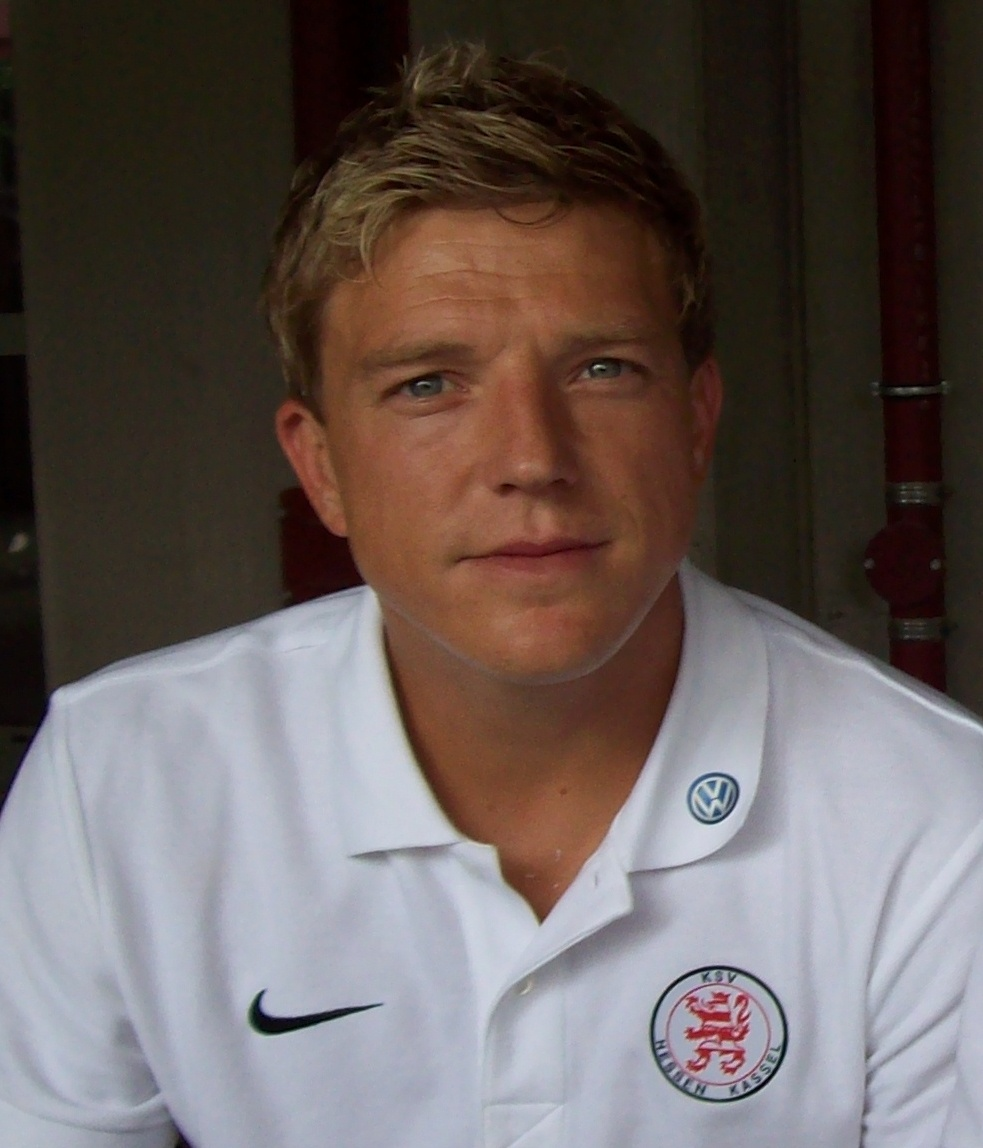

Personal information
- Date of birth: 15 December 1980 (age 45)
- Place of birth: Nördlingen, West Germany
- Height: 1.74 m (5 ft 8 1/2 in)
- Position: Attacking midfielder

Team information
- Current team: SV Neresheim (player-manager)

Youth career
- FV Schloßberg
- –1999: TSV 1861 Nördlingen

Senior career*
| Years | Team | Apps | (Gls) |
| 1999–2002 | SF Dorfmerkingen | 84 | (29) |
| 2002–2005 | VfR Aalen | 67 | (2) |
| 2005 | TSV Crailsheim | 13 | (6) |
| 2005–2006 | SSV Ulm 1846 | 34 | (26) |
| 2006–2008 | TSG 1899 Hoffenheim | 30 | (3) |
| 2008–2009 | VfR Aalen | 34 | (3) |
| 2009 | Kickers Emden | 15 | (2) |
| 2009–2010 | SSV Ulm 1846 | 30 | (8) |
| 2010–2014 | KSV Hessen Kassel | 126 | (40) |
| 2014–2016 | FC Memmingen | 65 | (18) |
| 2016–2017 | SSV Reutlingen | 28 | (11) |
| 2017–2019 | Normannia Gmünd | 56 | (18) |
| 2019–2020 | Sportfreunde Dorfmerkingen | 19 | (3) |
| 2020– | SV Neresheim | | |

Managerial career
- 2016–2017: SSV Reutlingen (player-assistant)
- 2020–2021: SV Neresheim (player-assistant)
- 2021–: SV Neresheim (player-manager)
- * Club domestic league appearances and goals as of 30 December 2020

Andreas Mayer (born 15 December 1980) is a German footballer and manager who plays for amateur club SV Neresheim.

== Career ==
=== Coaching career ===
In June 2020, Mayer joined SV Neresheim as a player-assistant. A year later, in June 2021, he was appointed player-manager of the club.
