= Kevin Freiberger =

German footballer

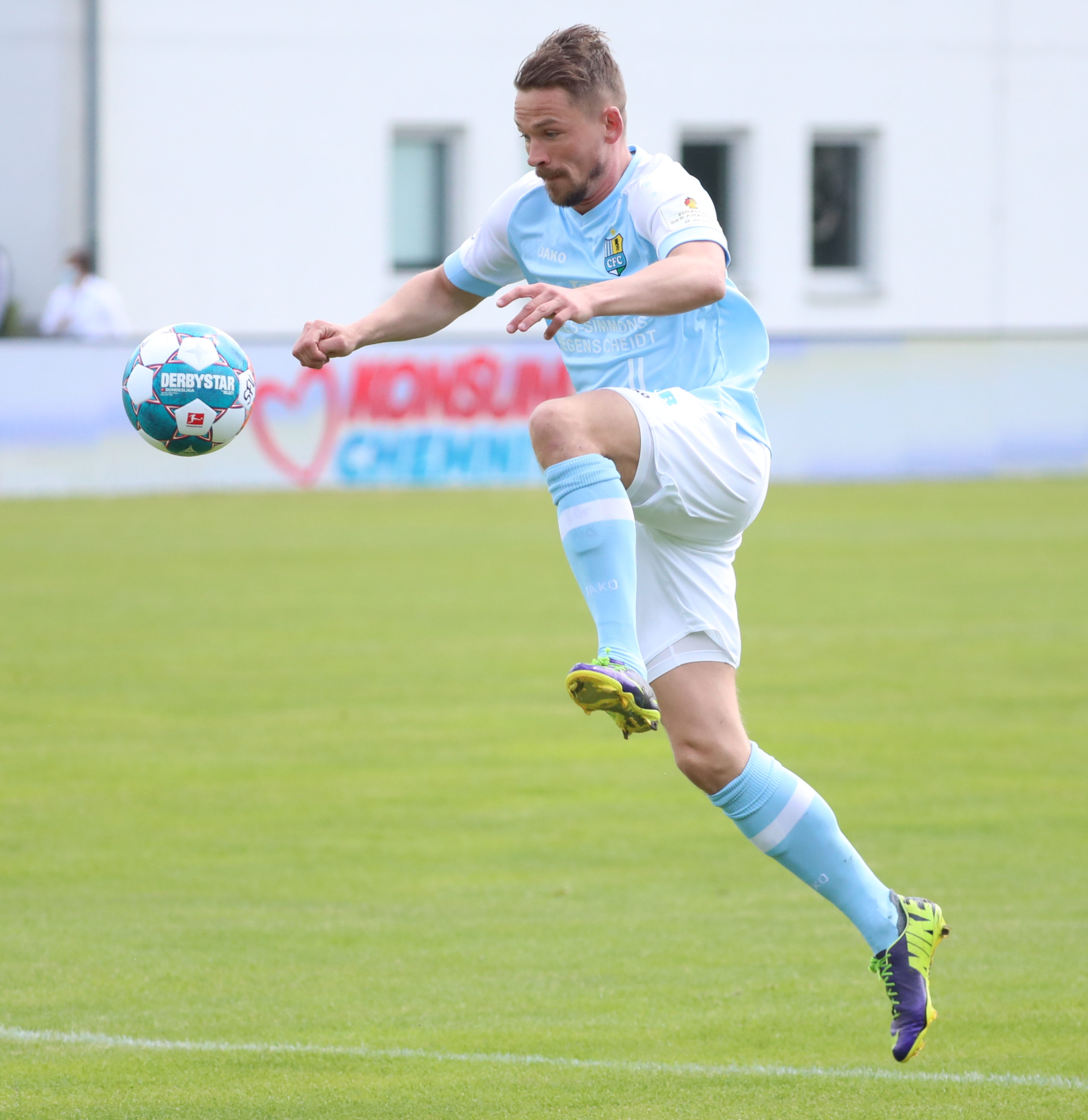

Personal information
- Date of birth: 16 November 1988 (age 37)
- Place of birth: Essen, West Germany
- Height: 1.75 m (5 ft 9 in)
- Position: Forward

Team information
- Current team: FC Gütersloh
- Number: 19

Youth career
- 1998–2008: SC Verl

Senior career*
Years	Team	Apps	(Gls)
2008–2010	SC Verl	53	(10)
2010–2012	VfL Bochum II	66	(21)
2012	VfL Bochum	1	(0)
2012–2013	Wacker Burghausen	9	(0)
2013–2014	Sportfreunde Lotte	50	(21)
2014–2015	VfL Osnabrück	4	(0)
2015	→ Rot-Weiss Essen (loan)	11	(1)
2015–2018	Sportfreunde Lotte	99	(28)
2018–2019	Rot-Weiss Essen	2	(0)
2019–2020	Sportfreunde Lotte	19	(9)
2020–2022	Chemnitzer FC	49	(16)
2022–	FC Gütersloh	71	(21)
- * Club domestic league appearances and goals as of 1 January 2025

Kevin Freiberger (born 16 November 1988) is a German football forward who plays for FC Gütersloh.

== Career statistics ==
As of 24 May 2017

Club	Season	League			Cup^{1}		Other^{2}		Total	
Club	Season	Division	Apps	Goals	Apps	Goals	Apps	Goals	Apps	Goals
SC Verl	2008–09	Regionalliga West	19	5	—		—		19	5
SC Verl	2009–10	Regionalliga West	34	5	—		—		34	5
VfL Bochum II	2010–11	Regionalliga West	32	9	—		—		32	9
VfL Bochum II	2011–12	Regionalliga West	34	12	—		—		34	12
VfL Bochum II	Total		66	21	0	0	0	0	66	21
VfL Bochum	2011–12	2. Bundesliga	1	0	0	0	—		1	0
Wacker Burghausen	2012–13	3. Liga	9	0	1	0	—		10	0
Sportfreunde Lotte	2012–13	Regionalliga West	13	6	1	0	2	0	16	6
Sportfreunde Lotte	2013–14	Regionalliga West	35	15	—		—		35	15
Sportfreunde Lotte	Total		48	21	1	0	2	0	51	21
VfL Osnabrück	2014–15	3. Liga	4	0	—		—		4	0
Rot-Weiß Essen	2014–15	3. Liga	11	1	—		—		11	1
Sportfreunde Lotte	2015–16	Regionalliga West	33	15	1	0	2	0	36	15
Sportfreunde Lotte	2016–17	3. Liga	37	10	4	2	0	0	41	12
Sportfreunde Lotte	Total		70	25	5	2	2	0	77	27
Career total			262	78	7	2	4	0	273	80

- 1.Includes DFB-Pokal.
- 2.Includes Regionalliga playoff.
