= Geberit-Arena =

Football stadium in Pfullendorf, Germany

Coordinates: 47.9184417°N 9.261952°E

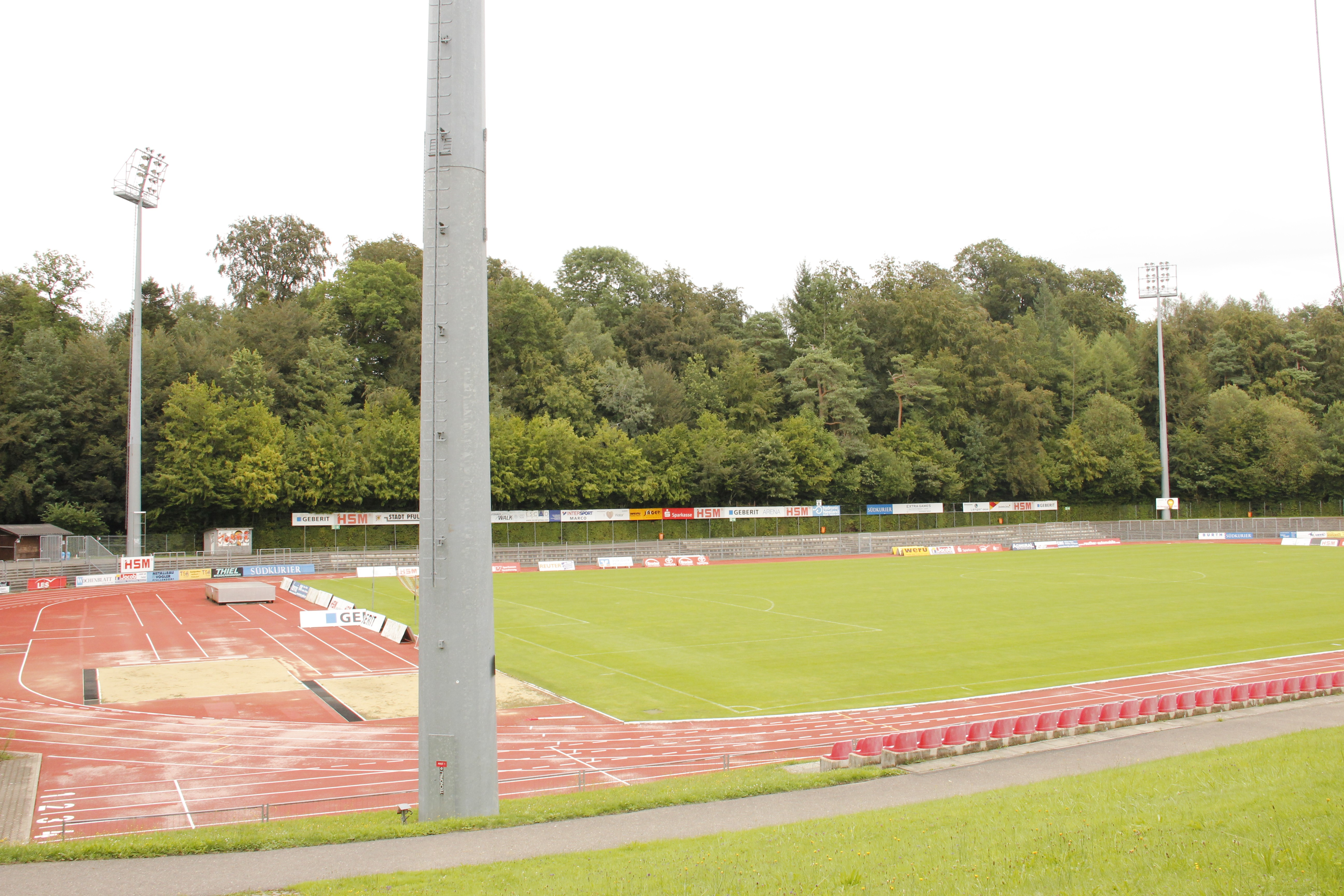
Geberit-Arena

Geberit-Arena is a multi-use stadium in Pfullendorf, Germany. It is currently used mostly for football matches and is the home stadium of SC Pfullendorf. The stadium is able to hold 10,000 people and opened in 1955.
