= Nicolai Groß =

German footballer

Personal information
- Date of birth: 3 February 1990 (age 36)
- Place of birth: Karlsruhe, Germany
- Height: 1.89 m (6 ft 2 in)
- Position: Striker

Team information
- Current team: FC Astoria Walldorf
- Number: 9

Youth career
- –2009: Germania Friedrichstal

Senior career*
Years	Team	Apps	(Gls)
2009–2010	FC Astoria Walldorf	29	(4)
2010–2012	1899 Hoffenheim II	32	(14)
2012–2013	1. FC Heidenheim	6	(1)
2013	→ Stuttgarter Kickers (loan)	9	(0)
2013–	FC Astoria Walldorf	168	(35)
- * Club domestic league appearances and goals as of 21 January 2021

Nicolai Groß (born 3 February 1990) is a German footballer who plays as a striker for FC Astoria Walldorf.

== Career ==
Groß began his career with Astoria Walldorf before joining 1899 Hoffenheim in January 2011. He spent eighteen months playing for the reserve team, and had a successful 2011–12 season, scoring 14 goals. In July 2012 he signed for 1. FC Heidenheim of the 3. Liga, and made his debut on the second day of the season, as a substitute for Dennis Malura in a 4–0 win over Rot-Weiss Erfurt. After half a season with Heidenheim, he joined Stuttgarter Kickers on a six-month loan in January 2013 before being released by Heidenheim at the end of the loan. He returned to FC Astoria Walldorf shortly afterwards and helped them earn promotion to the Regionalliga Südwest shortly afterwards.
