= Stuttgarter Kickers =

German association football club

- Full name: Sportverein Stuttgarter Kickers e.V.
- Nicknames: Die Blauen (The Blues), Die Blauen-Götter (The Blue-Gods)
- Founded: 21 September 1899; 127 years ago
- Ground: Gazi-Stadion auf der Waldau
- Capacity: 11,410
- President: Rainer Lorz
- Head coach: Holger Bachthaler
- League: Regionalliga Südwest (IV)
- 2025–26: Regionalliga Südwest, 7th of 18
- Website: www.stuttgarter-kickers.de
Home colours	Away colours

Stuttgarter Kickers is a German association football club that plays in Stuttgart, Baden-Württemberg, founded on 21 September 1899 as FC Stuttgarter Cickers. The club currently plays in the Regionalliga Südwest, the fourth tier of German football.

== History ==
In its early years the club had a decent local squad that played in the Südkreis-Liga, Kreisliga Württemberg and then in the Bezirksliga Württemberg. With the reorganization of German football during the Third Reich in 1933, the team – now known as SV Stuttgarter Kickers – found itself in the Gauliga Württemberg, one of sixteen top tier regional leagues established in the country during that time. It continued to have good results locally, but was unable to impress beyond its own area. In the final year of World War II, the Kickers fielded a combined wartime squad with Sportfreunde Stuttgart.

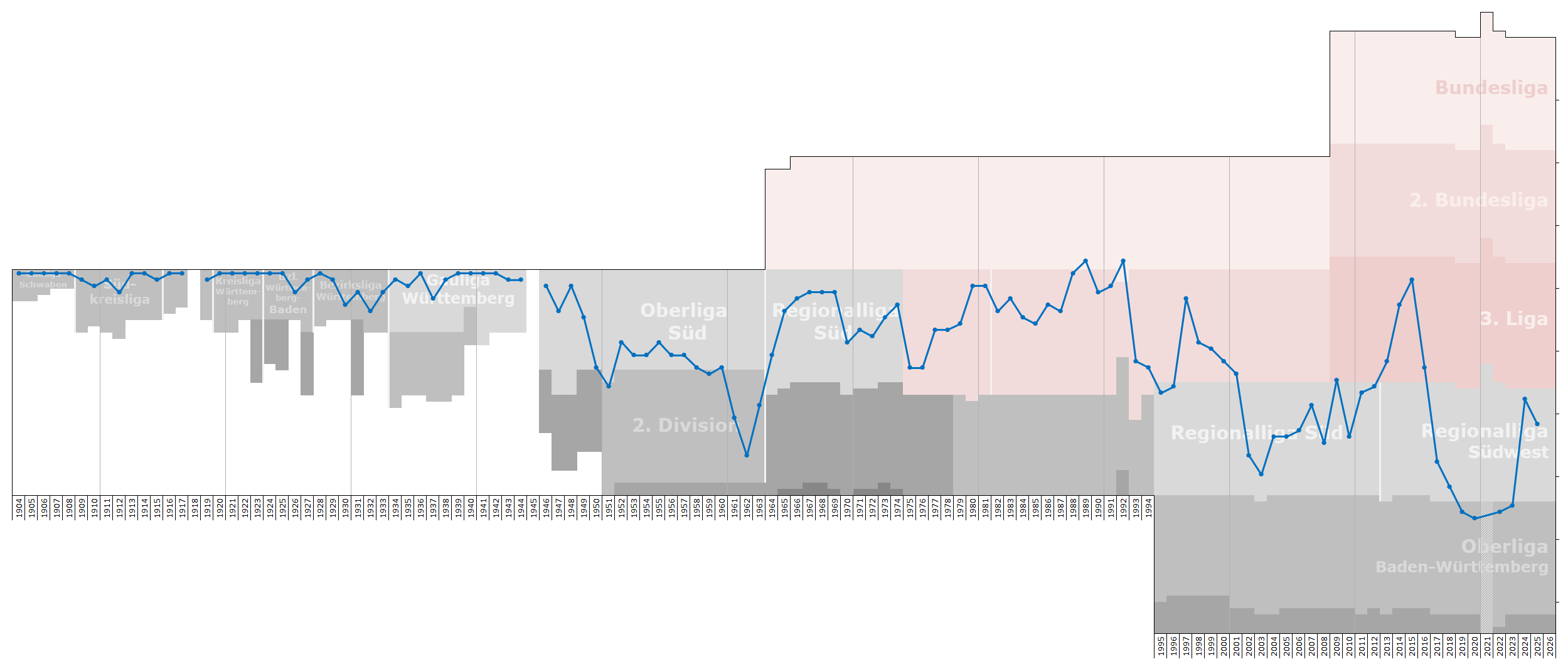
Historical chart of Stuttgarter Kickers league performance

After the war the club resumed play in the Oberliga Süd and performed as a mid-table team early on. By 1950 it had slipped to the lower half of the table with a seemingly solid grip in 14th place, constantly struggling to avoid relegation throughout the decade. Kickers spent the early 60s in tier II football, but after the formation of the Bundesliga, Germany's new professional league, in 1963, the club was moved to the Regionalliga Süd. In 1974, that league went professional and became the 2. Bundesliga. Between 1963 and the late 1980s, the team had varying results, but finally stabilized in the upper half of the standings toward the end of that period. It has one losing appearance to its credit in the DFB-Pokal in 1987, and in 1988–89 it made it to the Bundesliga for the first time. It ended a run of 28 years as a second division outfit. The team was immediately relegated after a 17th-place finish, but continued to deliver some of its best performances. Die Blauen advanced to the semi-finals of the 2000 DFB-Pokal and then had a second turn in the Bundesliga in 1991–92, but with the same result as its earlier time up. Over the next decade, the club played largely in the second division, before slipping to the Regionalliga Süd (III) in 2001, where they remained until 2008, when a tenth-place finish narrowly qualified them for the new 3. Liga. They finished last (20th) in the 3. Liga in 2008–09 and were relegated to the Regionalliga Süd. After three seasons at Regionalliga level, the Kickers returned to the 3. Liga in 2012, where it played for four seasons until relegation at the end of 2015–16, now dropping down to the Regionalliga Südwest. In 2018, they were relegated once more to the Oberliga Baden-Württemberg. It spent five seasons in the Oberliga before being promoted back into the Regionalliga with a first-place finish in 2023. In its first season back in the Regionalliga, the Kickers narrowly missed back-to-back promotions after finishing in second place, just two points off the lead.

== Other departments ==
The Stuttgarter Kickers also have handball, athletics, table tennis, cheerleading, and lacrosse departments. The association is also recognized for its training of football referees and other game officials. They had a field hockey department too, which in 1957 became independent under the name of HTC Stuttgarter Kickers.

== Players ==
=== Current squad ===
As of 8 September 2026

Note: Flags indicate national team as defined under FIFA eligibility rules; some limited exceptions apply. Players may hold more than one non-FIFA nationality.

No.	Pos.	Nation	Player
1	GK	GER	Felix Dornebusch
3	DF	GER	Leon Beer
4	DF	ALB	Elvir Zukaj
5	DF	GER	Jacob Danquah
6	MF	GER	Ben-Luca Fisher
7	FW	GER	Yannick Glessing
9	FW	GER	Sebastian Müller
13	MF	GER	Nevio Schembri
14	MF	GER	Melkamu Frauendorf
15	MF	GER	Nico Blank
16	FW	GER	Laurin Völlmerk
17	MF	GER	Nico Molinari
18	MF	GER	Maximilian Zaiser
19	DF	GER	Nico Fundel
20	MF	KOS	Lirjon Abdullahu
21	MF	GER	Philipp Licht

No.	Pos.	Nation	Player
22	DF	TUR	Malik Sama
23	DF	GER	Christoph Meister
24	DF	GER	Vincent Schwab
25	GK	GER	Thomas Bromma
26	DF	GER	Luca Trslic
27	DF	GER	David Udogu
28	MF	GER	Lukas Kiefer
29	FW	GER	David Stojak
30	FW	GAM	Abdoulie Mboob
31	DF	ALB	Ardi Mulaj
32	MF	GER	Leandro Mendes
33	FW	GER	Dejan Božić
35	GK	GER	Léon Neaimé
36	DF	GER	Maximilian Vogel (on loan from Heidenheim II)
38	MF	GER	Christian Mauersberger
39	FW	GER	Samuel Unsöld

=== Out on loan ===
Note: Flags indicate national team as defined under FIFA eligibility rules; some limited exceptions apply. Players may hold more than one non-FIFA nationality.

No.	Pos.	Nation	Player
39	GK	CRO	David Mitrović (at FC Nöttingen until 30 June 2027)

== Reserve team ==
The Stuttgarter Kickers II, historically also known as Stuttgarter Kickers Amateure, have been playing in the Oberliga Baden-Württemberg since 2000. Previously, the team fluctuated between the Landesliga and Verbandsliga Württemberg.

== Honours ==
The club's honours:

=== League ===
- German football championship
  - Runners-up: 1908
- Southern German championship
  - Champions: 1908, 1913, 1917
- Südkreis-Liga (I)
  - Champions: 1913, 1914, 1917
- Kreisliga Württemberg (I)
  - Champions: 1921, 1923
- Bezirksliga Württemberg-Baden (I)
  - Champions: 1924, 1925
- Bezirksliga Württemberg (I)
  - Champions: 1928, 1933
  - Runners-up: 1929
- Gauliga Württemberg (I)
  - Champions: 1936, 1939, 1940, 1941, 1942
- 2nd Oberliga Süd (II)
  - Champions: 1951, 1959
- 2nd Bundesliga (II)
  - Champions: 1988
- Regionalliga Süd (III/IV)
  - Champions: 1996, 2012
  - Runners-up: 1995, 2011

=== Cup ===
- DFB-Pokal
  - Runners-up: 1987
- Württemberg Cup (Tiers III–VII)
  - Winners: 2005, 2006, 2022
  - Runners-up: 2003, 2014, 2017, 2023, 2026

=== Youth ===
The club's youth teams have enjoyed quite a bit of success on the national scene.

- German Under 19 championship
  - Champions: 1979
- German Junior Cup
  - Winners: 1990
- ^{‡} Reserve team.

== Recent seasons ==
The recent season-by-season performance of the club:

=== Stuttgarter Kickers ===
Season	Division	Tier	Position
1999–2000	2. Bundesliga	II	15th
2000–01	2. Bundesliga	II	17th ↓
2001–02	Regionalliga Süd	III	12th
2002–03	Regionalliga Süd	III	15th
2003–04	Regionalliga Süd	III	9th
2004–05	Regionalliga Süd	III	9th
2005–06	Regionalliga Süd	III	8th
2006–07	Regionalliga Süd	III	4th
2007–08	Regionalliga Süd	III	10th
2008–09	3. Liga	III	20th ↓
2009–10	Regionalliga Süd	IV	9th
2010–11	Regionalliga Süd	IV	2nd
2011–12	Regionalliga Süd	IV	1st ↑
2012–13	3. Liga	III	17th
2013–14	3. Liga	III	8th
2014–15	3. Liga	III	4th
2015–16	3. Liga	III	18th ↓
2016–17	Regionalliga Südwest	IV	13th
2017–18	Regionalliga Südwest	IV	17th ↓
2018–19	Oberliga Baden-Württemberg	V	2nd
2019–20	Oberliga Baden-Württemberg	V	3rd
2020–21	Oberliga Baden-Württemberg	V	2nd
2021–22	Oberliga Baden-Württemberg	V	2nd
2022–23	Oberliga Baden-Württemberg	V	1st ↑
2023–24	Regionalliga Südwest	IV	2nd
2024-25	Regionalliga Südwest	IV	6th
2025-26	Regionalliga Südwest	IV	7th

=== Stuttgarter Kickers II ===
Season	Division	Tier	Position
1999–2000	Verbandsliga Württemberg	V	2nd ↑
2000–01	Oberliga Baden-Württemberg	IV	11th
2001–02	Oberliga Baden-Württemberg	IV	8th
2002–03	Oberliga Baden-Württemberg	IV	7th
2003–04	Oberliga Baden-Württemberg	IV	12th
2004–05	Oberliga Baden-Württemberg	IV	10th
2005–06	Oberliga Baden-Württemberg	IV	13th
2006–07	Oberliga Baden-Württemberg	IV	9th
2007–08	Oberliga Baden-Württemberg	IV	15th
2008–09	Oberliga Baden-Württemberg	V	7th
2009–10	Oberliga Baden-Württemberg	V	12th
2010–11	Oberliga Baden-Württemberg	V	6th
2011–12	Oberliga Baden-Württemberg	V	15th
2012–13	Oberliga Baden-Württemberg	V	14th
2013–14	Oberliga Baden-Württemberg	V	10th
2014–15	Oberliga Baden-Württemberg	V	14th
2015–16	Oberliga Baden-Württemberg	V	12th
2016–17	Oberliga Baden-Württemberg	V	18th ↓
2017–18	Withdrawn		

- With the introduction of the Regionalligas in 1994 and the 3. Liga in 2008 as the new third tier, below the 2. Bundesliga, all leagues below dropped one tier.

=== Key ===
↑Promoted	↓ Relegated

== Presidential history ==
The club's presidents:

- 1900–1900 Hans Schröder
- 1900–1900 Hans Spandau
- 1900–1901 Gustav Dreher
- 1901–1902 Richard Dürr
- 1902–1904 Viktor Mäulen
- 1904–1905 Gustav Dreher
- 1905–1908 Alfred Hezel
- 1908–1911 Hans Trapp
- 1911–1912 Anton Salg
- 1912–1919 Hans Trapp
- 1919–1921 Albert Mann
- 1921–1926 Friedrich Häussermann
- 1927–1929 Max Maurer
- 1929–1934 Gotthilf Waizenegger
- 1934–1937 Karl Umgelter
- 1937–1945 Hermann Kurz
- 1945–1948 Eugen Grau
- 1948–1950 Richard "Molly" Schauffele
- 1950–1951 Max Maurer
- 1951–1952 Wilhelm Reuter
- 1952–1955 Dr. Erich Häussermann
- 1955–1957 Erich Scriba
- 1957–1957 Philipp Metzler
- 1957–1958 Hermann Ulrich
- 1958–1960 Albrecht Brunst
- 1960–1960 Willi Knörzer
- 1960–1962 Albrecht Brunst
- 1962–1963 Gottfried Sälzer
- 1963–1967 Helmuth Bauer
- 1967–1979 Walter Queissner
- 1979–2003 Axel Dünnwald-Metzler
- 07/2003 – 03/2007 Hans Kullen
- 03/2007 – 07/2009 Dirk Eichelbaum
- 07/2009 – 11/2010 Edgar Kurz
- since 12 January 2010 Prof. Dr. Rainer Lorz

== Coaching history ==
The club's coaches:

- 7 January 1945 – 30 June 1946 Ossi Müller
- 7 January 1946 – 30 June 1947 Albert Cozza
- 7 January 1947 – 30 June 1948 Albert Cozza, Josef "Seppl" Müller and Lory Polster
- 7 January 1948 – 30 June 1950 Emil Melcher
- 7 January 1950 – 30 June 1951 Kuno Krügel
- 7 January 1951 – 30 June 1952 Fritz Kerr
- 7 January 1952 – 30 June 1953 Kuno Krügel
- 7 January 1953 – 30 June 1954 Eduard Havlicek
- 7 January 1954 – 30 June 1956 Georg Bayerer
- 7 January 1956 – 30 June 1958 Oswald Pfau
- 7 January 1958 – 30 June 1960 Benda Hügel
- 7 January 1960 – 30 June 1962 Karl-Heinz Grindler
- 7 January 1961 – 30 April 1962 Jenö Csaknady
- 5 January 1962 – 30 June 1962 Albert Sing
- 7 January 1962 – 30 June 1966 Hans Eberle
- 7 January 1966 – 30 June 1969 Georg Wurzer
- 7 January 1969 – 30 November 1969 Gerd Menne
- 12 January 1969 – 30 June 1971 Georg Wurzer
- 7 January 1971 – 30 June 1972 Barthel Thomas
- 7 January 1972 – 30 June 1973 Willibald Hahn
- 7 January 1973 – 15 September 1974 Fritz Millinger
- 16 Sep 1974 – 30 June 1975 Georg Wurzer and Rudolf Kröner
- 7 January 1975 – 30 June 1977 Rudolf Kröner
- 7 January 1977 – 30 June 1978 Hans Cieslarczyk
- 7 January 1978 – 26 October 1980 Hans-Dieter Roos
- 27 Oct 1981 – 30 June 1982 Slobodan Cendic
- 7 January 1982 – 23 January 1983 Jürgen Sundermann
- 24 Jan 1983 – 21 October 1984 Horst Buhtz
- 22 Oct 1984 – 30 June 1987 Dieter Renner
- 7 January 1987 – 5 February 1990 Manfred Krafft
- 5 February 1990 – 30 June 1992 Rainer Zobel
- 7 January 1992 – 23 August 1992 Frieder Schömezler
- 25 Aug 1992 – 30 June 1993 Rolf Schafstall
- 7 January 1993 – 28 February 1994 Lorenz-Günther Köstner
- 3 January 1994 – 30 June 1994 Günter Sebert
- 7 January 1994 – 26 October 1994 Paul Sauter
- 26 Oct 1994 – 18 February 1998 Wolfgang Wolf
- 18 Feb 1998 – 24 February 1998 Frieder Schömezler
- 25 Feb 1998 – 17 May 1999 Paul Linz
- 18 May 1999 – 30 June 1999 Ralf Vollmer
- 7 January 1999 – 28 March 2000 Michael Feichtenbeiner
- 30 Mar 2000 – 30 June 2000 Dragoslav Stepanović
- 7 January 2000 – 25 September 2000 Hans-Jürgen Boysen
- 27 Sep 2000 – 26 August 2001 Rainer Zobel
- 27 Aug 2001 – 3 September 2003 Marcus Sorg
- 3 October 2001 – 27 October 2003 Rainer Adrion
- 27 Oct 2003 – 30 June 2007 Robin Dutt
- 7 January 2007 – 11 April 2007 Peter Zeidler
- 11 May 2007 – 21 September 2008 Stefan Minkwitz
- 21 Sep 2008 – 14 April 2009 Edgar Schmitt
- 14 Apr 2009 – 30 June 2009 Rainer Kraft
- 7 January 2009 – 19 November 2012 Dirk Schuster
- 19 Nov 2012 – 19 December 2012 Guido Buchwald (interim)
- 19 Dec 2012 – 4 July 2013 Gerd Dais
- 4 July 2013 – 9 September 2013 Massimo Morales
- 9 September 2013 – 30 September 2013 Jürgen Hartmann (interim)
- 30 Sep 2013 – 11 April 2015 Horst Steffen
- 11 April 2015 – 11 August 2015 Alfred Kaminski (interim)
- 11 September 2015 – 30 June 2016 Tomislav Stipić
- 7 January 2016 – 24 October 2016 Alfred Kaminski
- 11 April 2015 – 31 December 2016 Dieter Märkle (interim)
- 1 January 2017 – 16 October 2017 Tomasz Kaczmarek
- 17 October 2017 – 5 April 2018 Paco Vaz
- 9 April 2018 – 30 June 2018 Jürgen Seeberger
- 1 July 2018 – 30 June 2019 Tobias Flitsch
- 1 July 2019 – 27 September 2021 Ramon Gehrmann
- 27 September 2021 – 30 June 2024 Mustafa Ünal
- 1 July 2024 – 5 April 2026 Marco Wildersinn
- 5 April 2026 – 30 June 2026 Kerem Arslan (interim)
- 1 July 2026 – Holger Bachthaler
