= 2016–17 SC Paderborn 07 season =

SC Paderborn
2016–17 season
- Manager: Stefan Emmerling
- Stadium: Benteler-Arena
- 3. Liga: 18th
- DFB-Pokal: First round
- Westphalian Cup: Winner
Home colours	Away colours	Third colours
- All statistics correct as of 9 March 2017.

The 2016–17 SC Paderborn 07 season is the 110th season in the football club's history. After being relegated from the 2015–16 2. Bundesliga, Paderborn now play in the 3. Liga. They also participated in this season's edition of the domestic cup, the DFB-Pokal. The season covers a period from 1 July 2016 to 30 June 2017.

== Players ==
=== Squad ===
As of 26 January 2017

Note: Flags indicate national team as defined under FIFA eligibility rules; some limited exceptions apply. Players may hold more than one non-FIFA nationality.

No.	Pos.	Nation	Player
1	GK	GER	Lukas Kruse
2	DF	GER	Lukas Boeder
3	DF	GER	Florian Ruck
4	DF	GER	Tim Sebastian
5	DF	GER	Christian Strohdiek
7	MF	GER	Niko Dobros
8	MF	GER	Marc-André Kruska
9	FW	NED	Koen van der Biezen
11	MF	GER	Christian Bickel
12	DF	GER	Felix Herzenbruch
13	MF	GER	Sebastian Schonlau
14	DF	GER	Thomas Bertels
17	FW	SLO	Zlatko Dedić
18	FW	GER	Tim Mannek

No.	Pos.	Nation	Player
19	MF	GER	Marc Vucinovic
20	DF	GER	Pascal Itter
21	MF	GER	Semir Saric
22	MF	GER	Sven Michel
23	MF	GER	Robin Krauße
25	MF	GER	Aykut Soyak
27	MF	GER	Marcus Piossek
29	DF	GER	Sebastian Heidinger
30	GK	GER	Till Brinkmann
31	DF	GER	Ben Zolinski
32	DF	GER	Jan Steven Erisa
33	FW	FIN	Roope Riski
34	GK	GER	Michael Ratajczak
35	GK	GER	Jonas Brammen

== Competitions ==
Win Draw Loss

=== 3. Liga ===
==== League table ====
Pos	Team	Pld	W	D	L	GF	GA	GD	Pts	Promotion, qualification or relegation
16	Fortuna Köln	38	12	10	16	37	59	−22	46	
17	Werder Bremen II (Note: Reserve teams are ineligible for promotion or DFB-Pokal qualification.)	38	12	9	17	32	48	−16	45	
18	SC Paderborn (Note: SC Paderborn were originally relegated from the 2016–17 3. Liga after finishing 18th. However, 1860 Munich, who were relegated from the 2016–17 2. Bundesliga, were unable to obtain a license for the 2017–18 3. Liga. Therefore, SC Paderborn, who submitted a 3. Liga license application, remained in the league for the 2017–18 season.)	38	12	8	18	38	57	−19	44	
19	Mainz 05 II (R)	38	11	7	20	41	58	−17	40	Relegation to Regionalliga
20	FSV Frankfurt (Note: On 24 April 2017, FSV Frankfurt was deducted nine points for filing in for insolvency. Frankfurt appealed on 27 April 2017. On 4 May 2017, the appeal was rejected from the DFB. Another appeal was turned down on 10 May 2017. Frankfurt accepted the penalty on 17 May 2017.) (R)	38	7	13	18	38	50	−12	25	Relegation to Regionalliga

Source: DFB
Rules for classification: 1) Points; 2) Goal difference; 3) Goals scored
(R) Relegated

==== Results summary ====
Overall								Home						Away					
Pld	W	D	L	GF	GA	GD	Pts	W	D	L	GF	GA	GD	W	D	L	GF	GA	GD
38	12	8	18	38	57	−19	44	6	5	8	23	23	0	6	3	10	15	34	−19

Last updated: 20 May 2017.

==== Results by round ====
Round	1	2	3	4	5	6	7	8	9	10	11	12	13	14	15	16	17	18	19	20	21	22	23	24	25	26	27	28	29	30	31	32	33	34	35	36	37	38
Ground	A	H	A	H	A	H	A	H	A	H	A	H	A	H	A	H	A	A	H	H	A	H	A	H	A	H	A	H	A	H	A	H	A	H	A	H	H	A
Result	L	W	L	L	W	L	W	W	L	L	W	D	L	D	L	D	L	W	W	L	W	D	L	L	L	L	L	L	D	L	D	W	L	W	W	D	W	D
Position	18	16	18	18	15	15	15	15	18	18	18	17	17	17	18	18	18	17	17	18	18	18	19	19	19	19	19	19	19	19	19	19	19	17	17	17	17	18

Updated to match(es) played on 20 May 2017. Source:
A = Away; H = Home; W = Win; D = Draw; L = Loss

==== Matches ====
29 July 2016 Match 1	MSV Duisburg	1–0	SC Paderborn	Duisburg
20:30	Janjić 56'; Iljutcenko (yellow card) 87'; Bajić (yellow card) 89'	Report	van der Biezen (yellow card) 11'; Dobros (yellow card) 90+3'	Stadium: Schauinsland-Reisen-Arena; Attendance: 16,479; Referee: Christian Dingert

6 August 2016 Match 2	SC Paderborn	3–1	Mainz 05 II	Paderborn
14:00	Van der Biezen 6'; Schonlau 42'; Bickel 57'; Krauße (yellow card) 83'	Report	Lohkemper 15'; Rossmann (red card) 52'	Stadium: Benteler Arena; Attendance: 4,802; Referee: Florian Badstübner

9 August 2016 Match 3	1. FC Magdeburg	3–0	SC Paderborn	Magdeburg
19:00	Beck 26' 33' 87' (pen.); Löhmannsröben (yellow card) 49'; Sprenger (yellow card) 59'; Chahed (yellow card) 68'	Report	Schonlau (yellow card) 28'; Itter (yellow card) 75'	Stadium: MDCC-Arena; Attendance: 15,896; Referee: Frank Willenborg

13 August 2016 Match 4	SC Paderborn	1–2	SV Werder Bremen II	Paderborn
14:00	Zolinski (yellow card) 18'; Krauße (yellow card) 21' van der Biezen 60'; Kruse (yellow card) 90+2'	Summary	Schmidt (yellow card) 43'; Aidara (yellow card) 57'; Rehfeldt 90'; Kazior 90+3'	Stadium: Benteler Arena; Attendance: 4,749; Referee: Guido Winkmann

27 August 2016 Match 5	Wehen Wiesbaden	1–2	SC Paderborn	Wiesbaden
14:00	Funk (yellow card) 58'; Ruprecht 74' (pen.) (yellow card) 90+3'	Report	Strohdiek 28' (yellow card) 73'; Itter (yellow card) 59'; Zolinski (yellow card) 61'; Schonlau (yellow card) 71'; Krauße (yellow card) 83'; Michel 89'; Kruse (yellow card) 90+2'; Bertels (yellow card) 90+3'	Stadium: BRITA-Arena; Attendance: 1,942; Referee: Alexander Sather

11 September 2016 Match 6	SC Paderborn	1–3	Holstein Kiel	Paderborn
14:00	Zolinski 53'; Bertels (yellow card) 70'	Report	Hoheneder (yellow card) 6'; Czichos (yellow card) 24'; Lewerenz 44'; Drexler 51'; Fetsch 63' (yellow card) 78'	Stadium: Benteler Arena; Attendance: 5,726; Referee: Robert Schröder

17 September 2016 Match 7	RW Effurt	1–3	SC Paderborn	Erfurt
14:00	Kammlott (yellow card) 16'; Odak (yellow card) 72'; Vocaj 83'	Report	Bickel 23'; Michel 41' 79'; Zolinski (yellow card) 45+1'; Schonlau (yellow card) 58'; Sebastian (yellow card) 75'; Krauße (yellow card) 81'	Stadium: Steigerwaldstadion; Attendance: 5,550; Referee: Patrick Schult

21 September 2016 Match 8	SC Paderborn	4–2	Chemnitzer FC	Paderborn
18:30	Schonlau (yellow card) 28'; Conrad 47' (o.g.); Dedić 48' 56' (yellow card) 66'; Bertels (yellow card) 54'; Kruska (yellow card) 63'; Michel 68'; Vucinovic (yellow card) 76'	Report	Conrad (yellow card) 9'; Hansch 42'; Türpitz (yellow card) 44'; Stenzel (yellow card) 55'; Danneberg 59'	Stadium: Benteler Arena; Attendance: 4,203; Referee: Tim Skorczyk

24 September 2016 Match 9	SSV Jahn Regensburg	3–0	SC Paderborn	Regensburg
14:00	Grüttner 23'; George 34' 45'; Saller (yellow card) 81'	Report	Bertels (yellow card) 15'; Bickel (yellow card) 54'	Stadium: Continental Arena; Attendance: 4,582; Referee: (Germany) Marco Fritz

30 September 2016 Match 10	SC Paderborn	0–3	Hansa Rostock	Paderborn
19:00	Bertels (yellow card) 67'; Bickel (yellow card) 74'; Michel (yellow card) 82' (yellow-red card); Piossek (yellow card) 87'	Report	Erdmann (yellow card) 32' (goal) 80'; Wannenwetsch 62'; Grupe (yellow card) 65'; Ziemer 90+2'	Stadium: Benteler Arena; Attendance: 6,229; Referee: (Germany) Nicolas Winter

14 October 2016 Match 11	SG Sonnenhof Großaspach	2–3	SC Paderborn	Aspach
19:00	Sohm 19'; Röttger (yellow card) 63'; Osei Kwadwo 66'; Schiek (red card) 73'; Gehring (yellow card) 90+3'	Report	Dedić 31' 58' (yellow card) 78'; Zolinski 64'; Schonlau (yellow card) 73'; Piossek (yellow card) 81' van der Biezen (yellow card) 90+1'	Stadium: Mechatronik Arena; Attendance: 1,300; Referee: (Germany) Florian Heft

22 October 2016 Match 12	SC Paderborn	0–0	Hallescher FC	Paderborn
14:00	Strohdiek (yellow card) 45'; Zolinski (yellow card) 71'; Kruska (yellow card) 72'	Report	Gjasula (yellow card) 4'; Schilk (yellow card) 86'	Stadium: Benteler Arena; Attendance: 4,647; Referee: (Germany) Riem Hussein

29 October 2016 Match 13	FSV Frankfurt	3–0	SC Paderborn	Frankfurt
14:00	Schleusener 18'; Ornatelli 29' (yellow card) 69'; Barry (yellow card) 59'; Bahn 80'	Report	Bickel (yellow card) 47'; Zolinski (yellow card) 65'	Stadium: Frankfurter Volksbank Stadion; Attendance: 3,211; Referee: (Germany) Bastian Dankert

5 November 2016 Match 14	SC Paderborn	0–0	VfR Aalen	Paderborn
14:00	Strohdiek (yellow card) 53'; Kruska (yellow card) 75'	Report	Kartalis (yellow card) 23' (yellow-red card); Menig (yellow card) 80'	Stadium: Benteler Arena; Attendance: 3,526; Referee: (Germany) Marcel Schütz

19 November 2016 Match 15	Sportfreunde Lotte	6–0	SC Paderborn	Lotte
14:00	Freiberger 6' 29'; Dej 31' 51' (pen.); Granatowski (yellow card) 33'; Rosinger 82' 90'	Report	Strohdiek (yellow card) 30'	Stadium: Frimo Stadion; Attendance: 2,081; Referee: (Germany) Benjamin Cortus

26 November 2016 Match 16	SC Paderborn	1–1	Fortuna Köln	Paderborn
14:00	Bertels (yellow card) 18'; Michel (yellow card) 28'; Vucinovic (yellow card) 52'; Ruck (yellow card) 58'; Piossek (yellow card) 76'; Dedić 86'	Report	Dahmani 19'; Kessel (yellow card) 35'; Pazurek (yellow card) 52'; Theisen (yellow card) 60' (yellow-red card)	Stadium: Benteler Arena; Attendance: 3,709; Referee: (Germany) Pascal Müller

3 December 2016 Match 17	FSV Zwickau	3–0	SC Paderborn	Zwickau
14:00	König 7'; Paul (yellow card) 39'; Könnecke 53'; Nietfeld 73'	Report	Ruck (yellow card) 10'; Vucinovic (yellow card) 39'; Dobros (red card) 43'; Itter (yellow card) 50'	Stadium: Stadion Zwickau; Attendance: 3,301; Referee: (Germany) Felix-Benjamin Schwermer

10 December 2016 Match 18	SC Preußen Münster	0–1	SC Paderborn	Münster
14:00	Stoll (yellow card) 31'; Tekerci (yellow card) 51'	Report	Michel (yellow card) 21'; Bertels (yellow card) 23'; Sebastian (yellow card) 58'; Dedić 71'; Kruska (yellow card) 82'	Stadium: Preußenstadion; Attendance: 7,774; Referee: (Germany) Tobias Stieler

17 December 2016 Match 19	SC Paderborn	3–1	VfL Osnabrück	Paderborn
14:00	Sebastian 15'; Dedić 26'; Michel 30'; Kruska (yellow card) 49'; Zolinski (yellow card) 58'; Herzenbruch (yellow card) 61'; Piossek (yellow card) 73'	Report	Sangaré (yellow card) 4'; Reimerink (yellow card) 42'; Wriedt 51'	Stadium: Benteler Arena; Attendance: 8,041; Referee: (Germany) Christof Günsch

28 January 2017 Match 20	SC Paderborn	0–1	MSV Duisburg	Paderborn
14:00	Sebastian (yellow card) 51'	Report	Iljutcenko (yellow card) 33'; Engin 49'; Albutat (yellow card) 79'	Stadium: Benteler Arena; Attendance: 7,731; Referee: (Germany) Marcel Schütz

4 February 2017 Match 21	Mainz 05 II	0–1	SC Paderborn	Mainz
14:00	Rossmann (yellow card) 76'; Zimling (yellow card) 90+2'	Report	Schonlau (yellow card) 80'; Kruska 83'	Stadium: Bruchwegstadion; Attendance: 698; Referee: (Germany) Michael Bacher

11 February 2017 Match 22	SC Paderborn	1–1	1. FC Magdeburg	Paderborn
14:00	Beck 21' (o.g.); Strohdiek (yellow card) 37'; Zolinski (yellow card) 67'	Report	Chahed 17'; Löhmannsröben (yellow card) 20'; Handke (yellow card) 30'; Weil (yellow card) 35'	Stadium: Benteler Arena; Attendance: 6,244; Referee: (Germany) Harm Osmers

18 February 2017 Match 23	SV Werder Bremen II	1–0	SC Paderborn	Bremen
14:00	Eggestein 39'; Käuper (yellow card) 83'	Report	Kruska (yellow card) 74'	Stadium: Weserstadion Platz 11; Attendance: 742; Referee: (Germany) Henry Müller

24 February 2017 Match 24	SC Paderborn	0–1	Wehen Wiesbaden	Paderborn
19:00	Krauße (yellow card) 42'; Piossek (yellow card) 85'	Report	Andrich (yellow card) 2'; Dams (yellow card) 29'; Ruprecht (yellow card) 45+3'; Lorenz (yellow card) 47'; Schäffler 86'	Stadium: Benteler Arena; Attendance: 4,220; Referee: (Germany) Asmir Osmanagic

4 March 2017 Match 25	Holstein Kiel	2–1	SC Paderborn	Kiel
14:00	Schindler 15' 50'; Peitz (yellow card) 53'; Drexler (yellow card) 74'; Czichos (yellow card) 75'	Report	Zolinski 7' (yellow card) 45'; Michel (yellow card) 18'; Herzenbruch (yellow card) 35'; Strohdiek (yellow card) 44'; van der Biezen (yellow card) 58'; Riski (yellow card) 69' (yellow-red card); Bickel (yellow card) 87'	Stadium: Holstein-Stadion; Attendance: 4,939; Referee: (Germany) Tobias Reichel

11 March 2017 Match 26	SC Paderborn	0–1	RW Erfurt	Paderborn
14:00	Bertels (yellow card) 29'; Zolinski (yellow card) 42'; Strohdiek (yellow card) 88'	Report	Möckel (yellow card) 38'; Vocaj (yellow card) 40'; Bergmann 53'; Nikolaou (yellow card) 75'	Stadium: Benteler Arena; Attendance: 6,798; Referee: (Germany)

15 March 2017 Match 27	Chemnitzer FC	2–1	SC Paderborn	Chemnitz
19:00	Mast 21' (red card) 90+3'; Jopek (yellow card) 32' (yellow-red card); Frahn (yellow card) 37'; Türpitz 55' (yellow card) 75'; Stenzel (yellow card) 68'; Reinhardt (yellow card) 88'	Report	Bickel (yellow card) 20'; Vucinovic (yellow card) 52'; Sebastian (yellow card) 60'; Piossek 67'	Stadium: community4you ARENA; Attendance: 6,289; Referee: (Germany) Steffen Mix

18 March 2017 Match 28	SC Paderborn	0–2	SSV Jahn Regensburg	Paderborn
14:00	Kruska (yellow card) 6'; Piossek (yellow card) 9'; Heidinger (yellow card) 31'	Report	Lais (yellow card) 33' (goal) 69'; Pusch 85'; Grüttner (yellow card) 90+2'	Stadium: Benteler Arena; Attendance: 5,089; Referee: (Germany) Frank Willenborg

25 March 2017 Match 29	Hansa Rostock	1–1	SC Paderborn	Rostock
14:00	Grupe 14' (yellow card) 40'; Gebhart (yellow card) 30'	Report	Bickel (yellow card) 25'; Heidinger 26' (yellow card) 77'; Kruska (yellow card) 75'; Bertels (yellow card) 80'	Stadium: Ostseestadion; Attendance: 9,500; Referee: (Germany) Oliver Lossius

1 April 2017 Match 30	SC Paderborn	1–2	Sonnenhof Großaspach	Paderborn
14:00	Zolinski 3' (yellow card) 56'; Riski (yellow card) 10'; Strohdiek (yellow card) 19'; Vucinovic (yellow card) 65'; Sergio Gucciardo (yellow card) 71'; Krauße (yellow card) 82'	Report	Röser 19' (pen.) 41' (pen.) (yellow card) 68'; Leist (yellow card) 54'; Lorch (yellow card) 73'; Hoffmann (yellow card) 88'	Stadium: Benteler Arena; Attendance: 4,770; Referee: (Germany) Robert Kempter

5 April 2017 Match 31	Hallescher FC	1–1	SC Paderborn	Halle (Saale)
19:00	Baumgärtel 30' (yellow card) 52'; Brügmann (yellow card) 32'; Fennell (yellow card) 42'; Kleineheismann (yellow card) 88'	Report	Soyak 7'; Ratajczak (red card) 20'; Dedić (yellow card) 25'; Krauße (yellow card) 51'; Piossek (yellow card) 70'; Ruck (yellow card) 90'	Stadium: Erdgas Sportpark; Attendance: 5,242; Referee: (Germany) Justus Zorn

8 April 2017 Match 32	SC Paderborn	3–0	FSV Frankfurt	Paderborn
14:00	Boeder (yellow card) 29'; Riski 45+2'; Schonlau (yellow card) 62'; Piossek 65' 76'; Krauße (yellow card) 84'	Report	Ornatelli (yellow card) 45+3'; Leon Hammel (yellow card) 54'; Streker (yellow card) 82'	Stadium: Benteler Arena; Attendance: 4,327; Referee: (Germany) Asmir Osmanagic

15 April 2017 Match 33	VfR Aalen	4–0	SC Paderborn	Aalen
14:00	Menig 45+1'; Wegkamp 58' 67'; Deichmann 90'	Report		Stadium: SCHOLZ ARENA; Attendance: 3,934; Referee: (Germany) Patrick Schult

22 April 2017 Match 34	SC Paderborn	3–1	Sportfreunde Lotte	Paderborn
14:00	Zolinski 7' (yellow card) 61'; Sebastian 72' (pen.); Soyak 82'	Report	Neidhart (yellow card) 45' (yellow-red card); Nauber 68'; Sané (yellow card) 75'; Tankulić (yellow card) 90'	Stadium: Benteler Arena; Attendance: 4,511; Referee: (Germany) Johann Pfeifer

28 April 2017 Match 35	Fortuna Köln	0–1	SC Paderborn	Cologne
19:00		Report	Sebastian (yellow card) 64' (yellow-red card); Soyak 89'; Krauße (yellow card) 90+1'	Stadium: Südstadion; Attendance: 2,466; Referee: (Germany) Daniel Schlager

6 May 2017 Match 36	SC Paderborn	1–1	FSV Zwickau	Paderborn
14:00	Bertels (yellow card) 38'; van der Biezen 79'	Report	Schröter (yellow card) 17'; König 50'; Koch (yellow card) 56'	Stadium: Benteler Arena; Attendance: 6,214; Referee: (Germany) Aarne Aarnink

13 May 2017 Match 37	SC Paderborn	1–0	Preußen Münster	Paderborn
13:30	van der Biezen 2'	Report	Tekerci (yellow card) 45'; Grimaldi (yellow card) 68'; Schweers (yellow card) 89'	Stadium: Benteler Arena; Attendance: 9,756; Referee: (Germany) Christof Günsch

20 May 2017 Match 38	VfL Osnabrück	0–0	SC Paderborn	Osnabrück
13:30	Syhre (yellow card) 61'; Falkenberg (yellow card) 74'; Arslan (yellow card) 90+2'	Summary	van der Biezen (yellow card) 41'; Piossek (yellow card) 49'; Herzenbruch (yellow card) 57'; Zolinski (yellow card) 65'	Stadium: osnatel ARENA; Attendance: 9,971; Referee: (Germany) Benedikt Kempkes

=== DFB-Pokal ===
22 August 2016 First round	SC Paderborn	1–2	SV Sandhausen	Paderborn
18:30	Michel 50'	Report	Sukuta-Pasu 18' (pen.); Kister 90+1'	Stadium: Benteler-Arena; Attendance: 4,436; Referee: Martin Petersen

=== Westphalian Cup ===
9 November 2016 Last 16	Lennestadt	0–2	SC Paderborn	Lennestadt
19:00		Report		Stadium: Hensel Stadion

28 February 2017 Quarter Final	SC Paderborn	1–0	SC Verl	Paderborn
19:00		Report		Stadium: Benteler-Arena

18 April 2017 Semi Final	SC Paderborn	2–1 (a.e.t.)	Sprockhövel	Paderborn
19:00		Report		Stadium: Benteler-Arena

25 May 2017 Final	SC Paderborn	3–1	Sportfreunde Lotte	Paderborn
17:00		Summary		Stadium: Benteler-Arena
