= List of German football transfers summer 2018 =

This is a list of German football transfers in the summer transfer window 2018 by club. Only transfers of the Bundesliga and 2. Bundesliga are included.

== Bundesliga ==
Note: Flags indicate national team as has been defined under FIFA eligibility rules. Players may hold more than one non-FIFA nationality.

=== FC Bayern Munich ===
In:

No.	Pos.	Nation	Player
18	MF	GER	Leon Goretzka (from FC Schalke 04)

Out:

No.	Pos.	Nation	Player
20	DF	GER	Felix Götze (to FC Augsburg)
22	GK	GER	Tom Starke (retired)
23	MF	CHI	Arturo Vidal (to Barcelona)
30	MF	GER	Niklas Dorsch (to 1. FC Heidenheim)
40	MF	GER	Fabian Benko (to LASK Linz)
—	MF	BRA	Douglas Costa (to Juventus)

=== FC Schalke 04 ===
In:

No.	Pos.	Nation	Player
6	MF	ESP	Omar Mascarell (from Eintracht Frankfurt)
7	FW	GER	Mark Uth (from 1899 Hoffenheim)
8	MF	GER	Suat Serdar (from Mainz 05)
22	FW	GER	Steven Skrzybski (from Union Berlin)
26	DF	SEN	Salif Sané (from Hannover 96)

Out:

No.	Pos.	Nation	Player
3	DF	ESP	Pablo Insua (on loan to Huesca)
7	MF	GER	Max Meyer (to Crystal Palace)
8	MF	GER	Leon Goretzka (to Bayern Munich)
22	FW	CRO	Marko Pjaca (loan return to Juventus)
23	DF	ESP	Coke (to Levante)
32	FW	GHA	Bernard Tekpetey (to SC Paderborn)
—	DF	GER	Benedikt Höwedes (to Lokomotiv Moscow, previously on loan at Juventus)
—	DF	GER	Luke Hemmerich (to Erzgebirge Aue, previously on loan at VfL Bochum)

=== 1899 Hoffenheim ===
In:

No.	Pos.	Nation	Player
2	DF	NED	Joshua Brenet (from PSV)
13	MF	GER	Leonardo Bittencourt (from 1. FC Köln)
15	DF	GHA	Kasim Nuhu (from Young Boys)
19	FW	ALG	Ishak Belfodil (from Standard Liège, previously on loan at Werder Bremen)
32	MF	ITA	Vincenzo Grifo (from Borussia Mönchengladbach)

Out:

No.	Pos.	Nation	Player
8	MF	POL	Eugen Polanski (released)
19	FW	GER	Mark Uth (to FC Schalke 04)
29	MF	GER	Serge Gnabry (loan return to Bayern Munich)
31	DF	GER	Felix Passlack (loan return to Borussia Dortmund)
—	MF	BRA	Bruno Nazário (on loan to Atlético Paranaense, previously on loan at Guarani)
—	GK	GER	Marvin Schwäbe (to Brøndby, previously on loan at Dynamo Dresden)
—	DF	GER	Benedikt Gimber (to FC Ingolstadt 04, previously on loan at Jahn Regensburg)
—	MF	TUR	Barış Atik (to Dynamo Dresden, previously on loan at Darmstadt 98)
—	FW	GER	Joshua Mees (to Union Berlin, previously on loan at Jahn Regensburg)

=== Borussia Dortmund ===
In:

No.	Pos.	Nation	Player
4	DF	FRA	Abdou Diallo (from Mainz 05)
5	DF	MAR	Achraf Hakimi (on loan from Real Madrid)
6	MF	DEN	Thomas Delaney (from Werder Bremen)
27	MF	GER	Marius Wolf (from Eintracht Frankfurt)
35	GK	SUI	Marwin Hitz (from FC Augsburg)
40	GK	GER	Eric Oelschlägel (from Werder Bremen II)

Out:

No.	Pos.	Nation	Player
1	GK	GER	Roman Weidenfeller (retired)
9	FW	UKR	Andriy Yarmolenko (to West Ham United)
21	FW	GER	André Schürrle (on loan to Fulham)
24	DF	GER	Jan-Niklas Beste (to Werder Bremen)
25	DF	GRE	Sokratis Papastathopoulos (to Arsenal)
27	MF	GER	Gonzalo Castro (to VfB Stuttgart)
35	GK	GER	Dominik Reimann (to Holstein Kiel)
37	DF	GER	Erik Durm (to Huddersfield Town)
44	FW	BEL	Michy Batshuayi (loan return to Chelsea)
—	DF	GER	Felix Passlack (on loan to Norwich City, previously on loan at 1899 Hoffenheim)
—	MF	ESP	Mikel Merino (to Newcastle United, previously on loan)

=== Bayer 04 Leverkusen ===
In:

No.	Pos.	Nation	Player
1	GK	FIN	Lukáš Hrádecký (from Eintracht Frankfurt)
7	FW	BRA	Paulinho (from Vasco da Gama)
23	MF	GER	Mitchell Weiser (from Hertha BSC)
24	GK	GER	Thorsten Kirschbaum (from 1. FC Nürnberg)

Out:

No.	Pos.	Nation	Player
1	GK	GER	Bernd Leno (to Arsenal)
11	FW	GER	Stefan Kießling (retired)
22	MF	UKR	Vladlen Yurchenko (released)
36	GK	GER	Niklas Lomb (on loan to SV Sandhausen)
37	MF	GER	Marlon Frey (released)
—	FW	GER	Chinedu Ekene (to 1899 Hoffenheim II)

=== RB Leipzig ===
In:

No.	Pos.	Nation	Player
3	DF	URU	Marcelo Saracchi (from River Plate)
20	FW	BRA	Matheus Cunha (from Sion)
22	DF	FRA	Nordi Mukiele (from Montpellier)

Out:

No.	Pos.	Nation	Player
1	GK	SUI	Fabio Coltorti (released)
3	DF	BRA	Bernardo (to Brighton & Hove Albion)
8	MF	GUI	Naby Keïta (to Liverpool)
20	DF	GER	Benno Schmitz (to 1. FC Köln)
22	GK	SUI	Philipp Köhn (to Red Bull Salzburg)
24	MF	GER	Dominik Kaiser (to Brøndby)
—	MF	GER	Elias Abouchabaka (on loan to Greuther Fürth)
—	MF	GER	Felix Beiersdorf (on loan to ZFC Meuselwitz, previously on loan at BSG Chemie Leipzig)
—	MF	GER	Agyemang Diawusie (to FC Ingolstadt 04, previously on loan at Wehen Wiesbaden)
—	MF	GER	Vitaly Janelt (to VfL Bochum, previously on loan)
—	MF	HUN	Zsolt Kalmár (to DAC Dunajská Streda, previously on loan)
—	DF	GER	Anthony Jung (to Brøndby, previously on loan)

=== VfB Stuttgart ===
In:

No.	Pos.	Nation	Player
4	DF	GER	Marc-Oliver Kempf (from SC Freiburg)
7	DF	ESP	Pablo Maffeo (from Manchester City, previously on loan at Girona)
8	MF	GER	Gonzalo Castro (from Borussia Dortmund)
10	MF	GER	Daniel Didavi (from VfL Wolfsburg)
22	FW	ARG	Nicolás González (from Argentinos Juniors)
24	DF	CRO	Borna Sosa (from Dinamo Zagreb)
29	MF	POL	David Kopacz (from Borussia Dortmund Youth)
—	FW	GER	Roberto Massimo (from Arminia Bielefeld)

Out:

No.	Pos.	Nation	Player
11	FW	JPN	Takuma Asano (loan return to Arsenal)
23	MF	BEL	Orel Mangala (on loan to Hamburger SV)
25	DF	GER	Matthias Zimmermann (to Fortuna Düsseldorf)
33	FW	GER	Daniel Ginczek (to VfL Wolfsburg)
35	DF	POL	Marcin Kamiński (on loan to Fortuna Düsseldorf)
—	FW	GER	Roberto Massimo (on loan to Arminia Bielefeld)
—	DF	GER	Jean Zimmer (to Fortuna Düsseldorf, previously on loan)
—	DF	BRA	Ailton (on loan to Braga, previously on loan at Estoril)
—	MF	USA	Julian Green (to Greuther Fürth, previously on loan)
—	DF	FRA	Jérôme Onguéné (to Red Bull Salzburg, previously on loan)

=== Eintracht Frankfurt ===
In:

No.	Pos.	Nation	Player
1	GK	DEN	Frederik Rønnow (from Brøndby)
2	DF	FRA	Evan Ndicka (from Auxerre)
4	FW	CRO	Ante Rebić (from Fiorentina, previously on loan)
13	DF	MEX	Carlos Salcedo (from Guadalajara, previously on loan)
16	MF	ESP	Lucas Torró (from Real Madrid)
18	MF	POR	Francisco Geraldes (on loan from Sporting CP, previously on loan at Rio Ave)
27	FW	GER	Nicolai Müller (from Hamburger SV)
28	MF	BRA	Allan (on loan from Liverpool, previously on loan at Apollon Limassol)
29	GK	GER	Felix Wiedwald (from Leeds United)
30	MF	GER	Şahverdi Çetin (from Eintracht Frankfurt youth)
39	FW	POR	Gonçalo Paciência (from Porto)

Out:

No.	Pos.	Nation	Player
1	GK	FIN	Lukáš Hrádecký (to Bayer Leverkusen)
14	FW	GER	Alexander Meier (released)
17	MF	GHA	Kevin-Prince Boateng (to Sassuolo)
27	MF	GER	Marius Wolf (to Borussia Dortmund)
28	MF	GER	Aymen Barkok (on loan to Fortuna Düsseldorf)
34	GK	GER	Leon Bätge (to Würzburger Kickers)
38	FW	AZE	Renat Dadashov (to Estoril)
39	MF	ESP	Omar Mascarell (from Eintracht Frankfurt)
—	MF	GER	Max Besuschkow (on loan to Union Saint-Gilloise, previously on loan at Holstein Kiel)

=== Borussia Mönchengladbach ===
In:

No.	Pos.	Nation	Player
3	DF	SUI	Michael Lang (from Basel)
14	FW	FRA	Alassane Pléa (from Nice)
15	DF	GER	Jordan Beyer (from Borussia Mönchengladbach youth)
26	FW	GER	Torben Müsel (from 1. FC Kaiserslautern)
37	MF	ENG	Keanan Bennetts (from Tottenham Hotspur reserves)
40	DF	DEN	Andreas Poulsen (from Midtjylland)
42	DF	GER	Florian Mayer (from Borussia Mönchengladbach II)

Out:

No.	Pos.	Nation	Player
4	DF	DEN	Jannik Vestergaard (to Southampton)
26	FW	PAR	Raúl Bobadilla (to Argentinos Juniors)
32	MF	ITA	Vincenzo Grifo (to 1899 Hoffenheim)
33	GK	GER	Christofer Heimeroth (retired)
—	GK	GER	Janis Blaswich (to Heracles Almelo, previously on loan at Hansa Rostock)
—	FW	AUS	Kwame Yeboah (to Fortuna Köln, previously on loan at SC Paderborn 07)

=== Hertha BSC ===
In:

No.	Pos.	Nation	Player
12	GK	GER	Dennis Smarsch (from Hertha BSC youth)
13	MF	GER	Lukas Klünter (from 1. FC Köln)
14	FW	GER	Pascal Köpke (from Erzgebirge Aue)
15	MF	SRB	Marko Grujić (on loan from Liverpool)
16	MF	NED	Javairô Dilrosun (from Manchester City reserves)
20	MF	AUT	Valentino Lazaro (from Red Bull Salzburg, previously on loan)
32	FW	GER	Dennis Jastrzembski (from Hertha BSC youth)
36	FW	TUR	Muhammed Kiprit (from Hertha BSC youth)
—	FW	RUS	Maximilian Pronichev (from Hertha BSC II)

Out:

No.	Pos.	Nation	Player
16	FW	GER	Julian Schieber (to FC Augsburg)
23	MF	GER	Mitchell Weiser (to Bayer Leverkusen)
—	FW	RUS	Maximilian Pronichev (on loan to Erzgebirge Aue)
—	GK	GER	Nils Körber (on loan to VfL Osnabrück, previously on loan at Preußen Münster)
—	MF	JPN	Genki Haraguchi (to Hannover 96, previously on loan at Fortuna Düsseldorf)

=== Werder Bremen ===
In:

No.	Pos.	Nation	Player
2	DF	SWE	Felix Beijmo (from Djurgården)
4	FW	PER	Claudio Pizarro (from 1. FC Köln)
6	MF	GER	Kevin Möhwald (from 1. FC Nürnberg)
8	FW	JPN	Yuya Osako (from 1. FC Köln)
9	FW	AUT	Martin Harnik (from Hannover 96)
19	FW	USA	Josh Sargent (from Werder Bremen II)
27	GK	GRE	Stefanos Kapino (from Nottingham Forest)
30	MF	NED	Davy Klaassen (from Everton)
34	MF	GER	Jean-Manuel Mbom (from Werder Bremen youth)
36	DF	GER	Thore Jacobsen (from Werder Bremen II)
39	DF	GER	Jan-Niklas Beste (from Borussia Dortmund)
40	GK	GER	Luca Plogmann (from Werder Bremen youth)
—	MF	GER	Idrissa Touré (from Werder Bremen II)

Out:

No.	Pos.	Nation	Player
4	DF	GER	Robert Bauer (on loan to 1. FC Nürnberg)
6	MF	DEN	Thomas Delaney (to Borussia Dortmund)
8	MF	GER	Jérôme Gondorf (to SC Freiburg)
16	MF	AUT	Zlatko Junuzović (to Red Bull Salzburg)
17	FW	GER	Justin Eilers (to Apollon Smyrnis)
29	FW	ALG	Ishak Belfodil (loan return to Standard Liège)
38	MF	GER	Niklas Schmidt (on loan to Wehen Wiesbaden)
—	MF	HUN	László Kleinheisler (to Astana, previously on loan)
—	MF	MLI	Sambou Yatabaré (to Royal Antwerp, previously on loan)
—	DF	GER	Leon Guwara (to Utrecht, previously on loan at 1. FC Kaiserslautern)
—	DF	SUI	Ulisses Garcia (to Young Boys, previously on loan at 1. FC Nürnberg)
—	FW	GER	Lennart Thy (to BB Erzurumspor, previously on loan at VVV-Venlo)
—	MF	GER	Idrissa Touré (on loan to Juventus B)

=== FC Augsburg ===
In:

No.	Pos.	Nation	Player
4	DF	GER	Felix Götze (from Bayern Munich)
15	DF	CRO	Jozo Stanić (from FC Augsburg youth)
20	FW	GER	Julian Schieber (from Hertha BSC)
24	MF	FIN	Fredrik Jensen (from Twente)
26	DF	GER	Simon Asta (from FC Augsburg youth)
28	MF	GER	André Hahn (from Hamburger SV)
29	FW	GER	Romario Rösch (from FC Augsburg youth)

Out:

No.	Pos.	Nation	Player
4	DF	GHA	Daniel Opare (to Royal Antwerp)
7	MF	GER	Marcel Heller (to Darmstadt 98)
24	GK	GRE	Ioannis Gelios (to Hansa Rostock)
35	GK	SUI	Marwin Hitz (to Borussia Dortmund)
—	MF	GER	Moritz Leitner (to Norwich City, previously on loan)

=== Hannover 96 ===
In:

No.	Pos.	Nation	Player
2	DF	CRO	Josip Elez (from Rijeka, previously on loan)
8	MF	BRA	Walace (from Hamburger SV)
10	MF	JPN	Genki Haraguchi (from Hertha BSC, previously on loan at Fortuna Düsseldorf)
11	FW	JPN	Takuma Asano (on loan from Arsenal, previously on loan at VfB Stuttgart)
17	FW	USA	Bobby Wood (on loan from Hamburger SV)
28	DF	AUT	Kevin Wimmer (on loan from Stoke City)
30	GK	GER	Leo Weinkauf (from Bayern Munich II)
40	MF	GER	Linton Maina (from Hannover 96 youth)

Out:

No.	Pos.	Nation	Player
8	MF	GER	Manuel Schmiedebach (on loan to Union Berlin)
9	FW	BRA	Jonathas (on loan to Corinthians)
10	MF	GER	Sebastian Maier (to VfL Bochum)
11	MF	GER	Felix Klaus (to VfL Wolfsburg)
14	FW	AUT	Martin Harnik (to Werder Bremen)
19	DF	GER	Florian Hübner (to Union Berlin)
20	DF	SEN	Salif Sané (to FC Schalke 04)
26	FW	TUR	Kenan Karaman (to Fortuna Düsseldorf)
33	DF	GER	Fynn Arkenberg (to Hallescher FC)
35	FW	CUW	Charlison Benschop (to FC Ingolstadt 04)
—	FW	GER	Elias Huth (to 1. FC Kaiserslautern, previously on loan at Rot-Weiß Erfurt)
—	MF	GER	Marius Wolf (to Eintracht Frankfurt, previously on loan)

=== 1. FSV Mainz 05 ===
In:

No.	Pos.	Nation	Player
14	MF	CMR	Pierre Kunde (from Atlético Madrid, previously on loan at Granada)
19	DF	FRA	Moussa Niakhaté (from Metz)
23	DF	AUT	Phillipp Mwene (from 1. FC Kaiserslautern)
28	FW	FRA	Jean-Philippe Mateta (from Lyon, previously on loan at Le Havre)
34	MF	GER	Bote Baku (from Mainz 05 II)

Out:

No.	Pos.	Nation	Player
3	DF	NGA	Leon Balogun (to Brighton & Hove Albion)
4	DF	FRA	Abdou Diallo (to Borussia Dortmund)
5	MF	NED	Nigel de Jong (to Al Ahli Doha)
9	FW	JPN	Yoshinori Mutō (to Newcastle United)
13	DF	CRO	Marin Šverko (on loan to Karlsruher SC)
23	MF	GER	Suat Serdar (to FC Schalke 04)
—	GK	DEN	Jonas Lössl (to Huddersfield Town, previously on loan)
—	FW	BIH	Kenan Kodro (to Copenhagen, previously on loan at Grasshoppers)

=== SC Freiburg ===
In:

No.	Pos.	Nation	Player
3	DF	AUT	Philipp Lienhart (from Real Madrid, previously on loan)
11	FW	GER	Luca Waldschmidt (from Hamburger SV)
20	MF	GER	Jérôme Gondorf (from Werder Bremen)
21	MF	AUS	Brandon Borrello (from 1. FC Kaiserslautern)
23	DF	GER	Dominique Heintz (from 1. FC Köln)
26	GK	NED	Mark Flekken (from MSV Duisburg)

Out:

No.	Pos.	Nation	Player
2	DF	SRB	Aleksandar Ignjovski (to 1. FC Magdeburg)
20	DF	GER	Marc-Oliver Kempf (to VfB Stuttgart)
21	GK	GER	Patric Klandt (to 1. FC Nürnberg)
22	MF	SUI	Vincent Sierro (on loan to FC St. Gallen)
23	MF	GER	Julian Schuster (retired)
24	DF	GER	Georg Niedermeier (to Melbourne Victory)
28	MF	GER	Jonas Meffert (to Holstein Kiel)
31	FW	SVK	Karim Guédé (to SV Sandhausen)
40	MF	TUN	Mohamed Dräger (on loan to SC Paderborn 07)
44	GK	POL	Rafał Gikiewicz (to Union Berlin)
—	MF	GEO	Lucas Hufnagel (to SpVgg Unterhaching, previously on loan at 1. FC Nürnberg)
—	FW	GER	Fabian Schleusener (on loan to SV Sandhausen, previously on loan at Karlsruher SC)
—	DF	GER	Jonas Föhrenbach (on loan to Jahn Regensburg, previously on loan at Karlsruher SC)
—	MF	NOR	Mats Møller Dæhli (to FC St. Pauli, previously on loan)

=== VfL Wolfsburg ===
In:

No.	Pos.	Nation	Player
9	FW	NED	Wout Weghorst (from AZ Alkmaar)
11	MF	GER	Felix Klaus (from Hannover 96)
12	GK	AUT	Pavao Pervan (from LASK Linz)
32	DF	COD	Marcel Tisserand (from FC Ingolstadt 04, previously on loan)
33	FW	GER	Daniel Ginczek (from VfB Stuttgart)

Out:

No.	Pos.	Nation	Player
9	FW	BEL	Landry Dimata (on loan to Anderlecht)
11	MF	GER	Daniel Didavi (to VfB Stuttgart)
20	GK	GER	Max Grün (released)

=== Fortuna Düsseldorf ===
In:

No.	Pos.	Nation	Player
6	MF	USA	Alfredo Morales (from FC Ingolstadt 04)
8	MF	GER	Aymen Barkok (on loan from Eintracht Frankfurt)
9	FW	BEL	Benito Raman (from Standard Liège, previously on loan)
10	FW	GER	Marvin Ducksch (from FC St. Pauli, previously on loan at Holstein Kiel)
11	FW	TUR	Kenan Karaman (from Hannover 96)
19	MF	CRO	Davor Lovren (from Dinamo Zagreb, previously on loan)
20	FW	BEL	Dodi Lukebakio (on loan from Watford)
22	MF	AUT	Kevin Stöger (from VfL Bochum)
24	DF	GER	Georgios Siadas (from Fortuna Düsseldorf youth)
25	DF	GER	Matthias Zimmermann (from VfB Stuttgart)
26	DF	GER	Diego Contento (from Bordeaux)
39	DF	GER	Jean Zimmer (from VfB Stuttgart, previously on loan)
—	DF	POL	Marcin Kamiński (on loan from VfB Stuttgart)

Out:

No.	Pos.	Nation	Player
4	DF	GER	Julian Schauerte (to Eupen)
8	FW	USA	Jerome Kiesewetter (released)
11	MF	GER	Axel Bellinghausen (retired)
15	DF	GER	Lukas Schmitz (to Wolfsberger AC)
24	MF	JPN	Justin Kinjo (released)
25	MF	JPN	Genki Haraguchi (loan return to Hertha BSC)
—	FW	GER	Emmanuel Iyoha (on loan to Erzgebirge Aue, previously on loan at VfL Osnabrück)
—	FW	GER	Marlon Ritter (to SC Paderborn 07, previously on loan)
—	FW	TUR	Kemal Rüzgar (to Altınordu, previously on loan at Viktoria Köln)

=== 1. FC Nürnberg ===
In:

No.	Pos.	Nation	Player
2	DF	GER	Kevin Goden (from 1. FC Köln)
8	DF	GER	Robert Bauer (on loan from Werder Bremen)
19	FW	GER	Törles Knöll (from Hamburger SV)
26	GK	GER	Christian Mathenia (from Hamburger SV)
30	GK	GER	Patric Klandt (from SC Freiburg)
37	MF	GER	Timothy Tillman (on loan from Bayern Munich II)

Out:

No.	Pos.	Nation	Player
1	GK	GER	Thorsten Kirschbaum (to Bayer Leverkusen)
3	DF	SUI	Ulisses Garcia (loan return to Werder Bremen)
8	MF	GEO	Lucas Hufnagel (loan return to SC Freiburg)
14	MF	GER	Kevin Möhwald (to Werder Bremen)

== 2. Bundesliga ==
=== Hamburger SV ===
In:

No.	Pos.	Nation	Player
5	DF	SCO	David Bates (from Rangers)
7	MF	GER	Khaled Narey (from Greuther Fürth)
13	MF	GER	Christoph Moritz (from 1. FC Kaiserslautern)
19	FW	GER	Manuel Wintzheimer (from Bayern Munich Youth)
21	MF	GER	Moritz Kwarteng (from Hamburger SV II)
22	DF	GER	Stephan Ambrosius (from Hamburger SV II)
23	FW	ESP	Jairo Samperio (from Las Palmas)
25	MF	BEL	Orel Mangala (on loan from VfB Stuttgart)
26	DF	GER	Tobias Knost (from Hamburger SV youth)
27	DF	GER	Josha Vagnoman (from Hamburger SV youth)
30	GK	GER	Morten Behrens (from Hamburger SV II)
36	DF	GER	Patric Pfeiffer (from Hamburger SV youth)
39	FW	POL	Marco Drawz (from Hamburger SV youth)
—	MF	GER	Aaron Opoku (from Hamburger SV youth)

Out:

No.	Pos.	Nation	Player
1	GK	GER	Christian Mathenia (to 1. FC Nürnberg)
5	DF	ALB	Mërgim Mavraj (released)
7	FW	USA	Bobby Wood (on loan to Hannover 96)
11	MF	GER	André Hahn (to FC Augsburg)
12	MF	BRA	Walace (to Hannover 96)
15	FW	GER	Luca Waldschmidt (to SC Freiburg)
19	FW	GER	Sven Schipplock (to Arminia Bielefeld)
22	DF	GER	Bjarne Thoelke (to Admira Wacker)
26	FW	GER	Törles Knöll (to 1. FC Nürnberg)
27	FW	GER	Nicolai Müller (to Eintracht Frankfurt)
30	GK	SUI	Andreas Hirzel (to Vaduz)
—	MF	CRO	Alen Halilović (to Milan, previously on loan at Las Palmas)

=== 1. FC Köln ===
In:

No.	Pos.	Nation	Player
2	DF	GER	Benno Schmitz (from RB Leipzig)
3	DF	GER	Lasse Sobiech (from FC St. Pauli)
5	DF	GER	Rafael Czichos (from Holstein Kiel)
13	MF	AUT	Louis Schaub (from Rapid Wien)
24	MF	GER	Dominick Drexler (from Midtjylland)
35	DF	GER	Matthias Bader (from Karlsruher SC)
36	MF	GER	Niklas Hauptmann (from Dynamo Dresden)

Out:

No.	Pos.	Nation	Player
2	DF	GER	Kevin Goden (to 1. FC Nürnberg)
3	DF	GER	Dominique Heintz (to SC Freiburg)
8	MF	SRB	Miloš Jojić (to İstanbul Başakşehir)
13	FW	JPN	Yuya Osako (to Werder Bremen)
16	DF	POL	Paweł Olkowski (to Bolton Wanderers)
21	MF	GER	Leonardo Bittencourt (to 1899 Hoffenheim)
24	MF	GER	Lukas Klünter (to Hertha BSC)
25	DF	POR	João Queirós (on loan to Sporting CP B)
35	GK	GER	Sven Müller (to Karlsruher SC)
39	FW	PER	Claudio Pizarro (to Werder Bremen)

=== Holstein Kiel ===
In:

No.	Pos.	Nation	Player
1	GK	GER	Timon Weiner (from FC Schalke 04 youth)
5	DF	GER	Stefan Thesker (from Twente)
7	MF	KOR	Lee Jae-sung (from Jeonbuk Hyundai Motors)
10	MF	DOM	Heinz Mörschel (from Mainz 05 II)
16	MF	GER	Philipp Sander (from Holstein Kiel youth)
20	DF	GER	Jannik Dehm (from 1899 Hoffenheim II)
23	FW	GER	Janni Serra (from Borussia Dortmund II, previously on loan at VfL Bochum)
24	DF	GER	Hauke Wahl (from FC Ingolstadt 04)
29	DF	GER	Tobias Fleckstein (from FC Schalke 04 youth)
30	FW	GER	Benjamin Girth (from SV Meppen)
35	GK	GER	Dominik Reimann (from Borussia Dortmund)
—	MF	AUT	Mathias Honsak (on loan from Red Bull Salzburg, previously on loan at SCR Altach)
—	MF	GER	Jonas Meffert (from SC Freiburg)

Out:

No.	Pos.	Nation	Player
1	GK	PHI	Bernd Schipmann (to Rot Weiss Ahlen)
4	DF	AUT	Niklas Hoheneder (to Chemnitzer FC)
5	DF	GER	Rafael Czichos (to 1. FC Köln)
10	FW	GER	Marvin Ducksch (loan return to FC St. Pauli)
20	MF	GER	Joel Gerezgiher (to Sonnenhof Großaspach)
23	MF	GER	Luca Dürholtz (to SV Elversberg)
24	MF	GER	Dominick Drexler (to Midtjylland)
31	MF	GER	Max Besuschkow (loan return to Eintracht Frankfurt)
34	GK	GER	Lukas Kruse (released)

=== Arminia Bielefeld ===
In:

No.	Pos.	Nation	Player
5	MF	GER	Max Christiansen (from FC Ingolstadt 04)
14	MF	FRO	Jóan Símun Edmundsson (from Odense)
17	FW	GER	Prince Osei Owusu (from 1899 Hoffenheim II)
20	MF	GER	Nils Seufert (from 1. FC Kaiserslautern)
22	FW	GER	Roberto Massimo (on loan from VfB Stuttgart)
25	GK	GER	Philipp Klewin (from Rot-Weiß Erfurt)
27	DF	SUI	Cédric Brunner (from Zürich)
36	FW	GER	Sven Schipplock (from Hamburger SV)
37	MF	GER	Cerruti Siya (from Arminia Bielefeld youth)
38	MF	TUR	Semir Ucar (from Arminia Bielefeld youth)

Out:

No.	Pos.	Nation	Player
4	DF	GER	Nils Teixeira (to AEL Limassol)
17	MF	GER	Christoph Hemlein (to 1. FC Kaiserslautern)
22	FW	GER	Roberto Massimo (to VfB Stuttgart)
23	DF	GER	Florian Dick (to 1. FC Kaiserslautern)
27	MF	AUT	Konstantin Kerschbaumer (loan return to Brentford)
31	DF	GER	Henri Weigelt (to AZ Alkmaar)
33	GK	GER	Nikolai Rehnen (on loan to Fortuna Köln)

=== Jahn Regensburg ===
In:

No.	Pos.	Nation	Player
5	DF	GER	Dominic Volkmer (from Werder Bremen II)
10	FW	GER	Julian Derstroff (from SV Sandhausen)
14	DF	GER	Marcel Correia (from 1. FC Kaiserslautern)
19	DF	GER	Jonas Föhrenbach (on loan from SC Freiburg, previously on loan at Karlsruher SC)
20	MF	GER	Maximilian Thalhammer (on loan from FC Ingolstadt 04)
22	MF	GER	Sebastian Stolze (from VfL Wolfsburg II, previously on loan)
26	MF	POL	André Dej (from Sportfreunde Lotte)
32	GK	GER	Alexander Weidinger (from Jahn Regensburg II)
33	GK	GER	André Weis (from 1. FC Kaiserslautern, previously on loan)

Out:

No.	Pos.	Nation	Player
5	DF	GER	Benedikt Gimber (loan return to 1899 Hoffenheim)
7	MF	GER	Marcel Hofrath (released)
10	DF	GER	Marvin Knoll (to FC St. Pauli)
26	GK	GER	Bastian Lerch (retired)
27	MF	GER	Kevin Hoffmann (on loan to FSV Zwickau)
29	FW	GER	Joshua Mees (loan return to 1899 Hoffenheim)
31	GK	GER	Uwe Hesse (released)

=== VfL Bochum ===
In:

No.	Pos.	Nation	Player
7	MF	GER	Sebastian Maier (from Hannover 96)
20	MF	GER	Vitaly Janelt (from RB Leipzig, previously on loan)
23	MF	GER	Robert Tesche (from Birmingham City, previously on loan)
27	FW	SRB	Miloš Pantović (from Bayern Munich II)
30	MF	AZE	Baris Ekincier (from VfL Bochum youth)
35	FW	CGO	Silvère Ganvoula (on loan from Anderlecht, previously on loan at Mechelen)

Out:

No.	Pos.	Nation	Player
4	DF	GER	Simon Lorenz (on loan to 1860 Munich)
6	DF	GER	Luke Hemmerich (loan return to FC Schalke 04)
7	FW	GER	Selim Gündüz (released)
11	FW	GER	Janni Serra (loan return to Borussia Dortmund II)
14	MF	GER	Philipp Ochs (loan return to 1899 Hoffenheim)
22	MF	AUT	Kevin Stöger (to Fortuna Düsseldorf)
28	MF	GER	Ulrich Bapoh (on loan to Twente)
30	GK	POL	Martin Kompalla (released)
37	MF	GER	Julian Tomas (released)

=== MSV Duisburg ===
In:

No.	Pos.	Nation	Player
2	DF	KOR	Seo Young-jae (from Hamburger SV II)
8	DF	GER	Migel-Max Schmeling (from MSV Duisburg youth)
15	FW	NED	John Verhoek (from 1. FC Heidenheim)
19	FW	GER	Richard Sukuta-Pasu (from SV Sandhausen)
22	GK	GER	Jonas Brendieck (from MSV Duisburg youth)
23	DF	GER	Yanni Regäsel (free agent)
27	GK	GER	Daniel Mesenhöler (from Union Berlin)
29	DF	GER	Sebastian Neumann (from Würzburger Kickers)
36	MF	USA	Joe Gyau (from Sonnenhof Großaspach)

Out:

No.	Pos.	Nation	Player
1	GK	NED	Mark Flekken (to SC Freiburg)
5	DF	BIH	Branimir Bajić (retired)
10	FW	NGA	Kingsley Onuegbu (to Nea Salamis Famagusta)
21	DF	POL	Pascal Kubina (to SSVg Velbert)
22	GK	LBN	Daniel Zeaiter (to Alemannia Aachen)
27	DF	GER	Dan-Patrick Poggenberg (to Sonnenhof Großaspach)

=== 1. FC Union Berlin ===
In:

No.	Pos.	Nation	Player
1	GK	POL	Rafał Gikiewicz (from SC Freiburg)
6	MF	NOR	Julian Ryerson (from Viking)
8	FW	GER	Joshua Mees (from 1899 Hoffenheim, previously on loan at Jahn Regensburg)
10	FW	SWE	Sebastian Andersson (from 1. FC Kaiserslautern)
14	DF	GER	Ken Reichel (from Eintracht Braunschweig)
19	DF	GER	Florian Hübner (from Hannover 96)
24	MF	GER	Manuel Schmiedebach (on loan from Hannover 96)

Out:

No.	Pos.	Nation	Player
1	GK	GER	Daniel Mesenhöler (to MSV Duisburg)
6	DF	DEN	Kristian Pedersen (to Birmingham City)
8	MF	GER	Stephan Fürstner (to Eintracht Braunschweig)
10	MF	GER	Dennis Daube (to KFC Uerdingen 05)
16	FW	AUT	Philipp Hosiner (to Sturm Graz)
24	FW	GER	Steven Skrzybski (to FC Schalke 04)
37	DF	GER	Toni Leistner (to Queens Park Rangers)

=== FC Ingolstadt 04 ===
In:

No.	Pos.	Nation	Player
3	DF	BRA	Lucas Galvão (from Rapid Wien)
5	DF	GER	Benedikt Gimber (from 1899 Hoffenheim, previously on loan at Jahn Regensburg)
7	MF	AUT	Konstantin Kerschbaumer (from Brentford, previously on loan at Arminia Bielefeld)
14	FW	ENG	Osayamen Osawe (from 1. FC Kaiserslautern)
27	MF	GER	Agyemang Diawusie (from RB Leipzig, previously on loan at Wehen Wiesbaden)
29	FW	AUT	Thorsten Röcher (from Sturm Graz)
35	FW	CUW	Charlison Benschop (from Hannover 96)

Out:

No.	Pos.	Nation	Player
5	MF	GER	Max Christiansen (to Arminia Bielefeld)
6	MF	USA	Alfredo Morales (to Fortuna Düsseldorf)
7	MF	GER	Patrick Ebert (to Dynamo Dresden)
9	FW	GER	Moritz Hartmann (to Fortuna Köln)
14	FW	GER	Stefan Lex (to 1860 Munich)
17	MF	GER	Maximilian Thalhammer (on loan to Jahn Regensburg)
22	MF	JPN	Takahiro Sekine (on loan to Sint-Truiden)
25	DF	GER	Hauke Wahl (to Holstein Kiel)
—	DF	COD	Marcel Tisserand (to VfL Wolfsburg, previously on loan)
—	DF	SUI	Florent Hadergjonaj (to Huddersfield Town, previously on loan)
—	GK	DEN	Martin Hansen (to Basel, previously on loan at Heerenveen)

=== SV Darmstadt 98 ===
In:

No.	Pos.	Nation	Player
2	DF	GER	Sebastian Hertner (from Erzgebirge Aue)
19	FW	GER	Serdar Dursun (from Greuther Fürth)
20	MF	GER	Marcel Heller (from FC Augsburg)
28	DF	GER	Marcel Franke (on loan from Norwich City, previously on loan at Dynamo Dresden)

Out:

No.	Pos.	Nation	Player
9	FW	AUS	Jamie Maclaren (on loan to Hibernian)
10	MF	GER	Jan Rosenthal (retired)
19	MF	GER	Kevin Großkreutz (to KFC Uerdingen 05)
28	MF	TUR	Barış Atik (loan return to 1899 Hoffenheim)
35	DF	GER	Niklas Kern (to Wormatia Worms)
40	FW	GER	Silas Zehnder (on loan to Viktoria Aschaffenburg)

=== SV Sandhausen ===
In:

No.	Pos.	Nation	Player
2	DF	RUS	Aleksandr Zhirov (from Yenisey)
3	DF	GER	Alexander Rossipal (from 1899 Hoffenheim II)
4	DF	NED	Jesper Verlaat (from Werder Bremen II)
8	MF	TUN	Mohamed Gouaida (from Hamburger SV II)
11	FW	GER	Fabian Schleusener (on loan from SC Freiburg, previously on loan at Karlsruher SC)
12	FW	GER	Florian Hansch (from Chemnitzer FC)
16	FW	GER	Kevin Behrens (from 1. FC Saarbrücken)
20	MF	GER	Emanuel Taffertshofer (from Würzburger Kickers)
21	FW	SVK	Karim Guédé (from SC Freiburg)
25	MF	GER	Felix Müller (from Würzburger Kickers)
29	GK	GER	Niklas Lomb (on loan from Bayer Leverkusen)

Out:

No.	Pos.	Nation	Player
4	DF	GER	Damian Roßbach (to Karlsruher SC)
10	FW	GER	Richard Sukuta-Pasu (to MSV Duisburg)
11	MF	KOS	Eroll Zejnullahu (loan return to Union Berlin)
18	MF	GER	Robert Herrmann (to Erzgebirge Aue)
20	FW	ANG	José Pierre Vunguidica (to 1. FC Saarbrücken)
21	MF	GER	Manuel Stiefler (to Karlsruher SC)
26	FW	GER	Ali Ibrahimaj (to KFC Uerdingen 05)
37	FW	GER	Julian Derstroff (to Jahn Regensburg)
38	MF	GER	Mirco Born (on loan to SV Meppen)

=== FC St. Pauli ===
In:

No.	Pos.	Nation	Player
5	DF	GER	Marvin Knoll (from Jahn Regensburg)
14	MF	NOR	Mats Møller Dæhli (from SC Freiburg, previously on loan)
25	FW	NED	Henk Veerman (from Heerenveen)
31	MF	GER	Ersin Zehir (from FC St. Pauli II)
36	FW	GER	Luis Coordes (from FC St. Pauli youth)

Out:

No.	Pos.	Nation	Player
3	DF	GER	Lasse Sobiech (to 1. FC Köln)
5	DF	SUI	Joël Keller (to SC Weiche Flensburg 08)
31	MF	GER	Maurice Litka (on loan to KFC Uerdingen 05)
37	MF	KOR	Choi Kyoung-rok (to Karlsruher SC)
—	FW	GER	Marvin Ducksch (to Fortuna Düsseldorf, previously on loan at Holstein Kiel)

=== 1. FC Heidenheim ===
In:

No.	Pos.	Nation	Player
6	DF	GER	Patrick Mainka (from Borussia Dortmund II)
8	MF	GER	Robert Andrich (from Wehen Wiesbaden)
16	MF	GER	Kevin Sessa (from 1. FC Heidenheim youth)
32	FW	GER	Patrick Schmidt (from 1. FC Saarbrücken)
34	DF	GER	Tobias Reithmeir (from 1. FC Heidenheim youth)
36	MF	GER	Niklas Dorsch (from Bayern Munich)
37	MF	GER	Gökalp Kılıç (from 1. FC Heidenheim youth)

Out:

No.	Pos.	Nation	Player
15	FW	NED	John Verhoek (to MSV Duisburg)
20	DF	GER	Ronny Philp (to 1. FC Schweinfurt 05)
23	DF	GER	Kevin Kraus (to 1. FC Kaiserslautern)
26	MF	GER	Marcel Titsch-Rivero (released)
31	FW	GER	Dominik Widemann (to SpVgg Unterhaching)
34	DF	BIH	Ibrahim Hajtić (to Würzburger Kickers)
36	MF	GER	Dave Gnaase (to Würzburger Kickers)

=== Dynamo Dresden ===
In:

No.	Pos.	Nation	Player
2	DF	SWE	Linus Wahlqvist (from IFK Norrköping)
3	DF	BIH	Dario Đumić (on loan from Utrecht)
4	DF	GER	Jannis Nikolaou (from Würzburger Kickers)
15	FW	GER	Osman Atılgan (from Dynamo Dresden youth)
20	MF	GER	Patrick Ebert (from FC Ingolstadt 04)
21	GK	GER	Tim Boss (from Fortuna Köln)
28	MF	TUR	Barış Atik (from 1899 Hoffenheim, previously on loan at Darmstadt 98)
31	DF	DEN	Brian Hämäläinen (from Zulte Waregem)
35	MF	GER	Marius Hauptmann (from Dynamo Dresden youth)

Out:

No.	Pos.	Nation	Player
5	MF	GER	Manuel Konrad (to KFC Uerdingen 05)
14	FW	TOG	Peniel Mlapa (on loan to VVV-Venlo)
17	MF	GER	Andreas Lambertz (to Fortuna Düsseldorf II)
20	DF	GER	Fabian Müller (to Chemnitzer FC)
25	GK	GER	Marvin Schwäbe (loan return to 1899 Hoffenheim)
28	DF	GER	Marcel Franke (loan return to Norwich City)
36	MF	GER	Niklas Hauptmann (to 1. FC Köln)
—	DF	GER	Marc Wachs (to Wehen Wiesbaden, previously on loan at VfL Osnabrück)

=== SpVgg Greuther Fürth ===
In:

No.	Pos.	Nation	Player
8	MF	GER	Elias Abouchabaka (on loan from RB Leipzig)
10	FW	GER	Daniel Keita-Ruel (from Fortuna Köln)
20	MF	GHA	David Atanga (on loan from Red Bull Salzburg, previously on loan at SKN St. Pölten)
22	DF	CRO	Mario Maloča (from Lechia Gdańsk, previously on loan)
24	DF	GER	Maximilian Sauer (from Eintracht Braunschweig)
25	GK	GER	Leon Schaffran (from Hertha BSC II)
29	DF	GER	Tobias Mohr (from Alemannia Aachen)
37	MF	USA	Julian Green (from VfB Stuttgart, previously on loan)

Out:

No.	Pos.	Nation	Player
9	FW	GER	Serdar Dursun (to SV Darmstadt 98)
16	MF	HUN	Ádám Pintér (to MTK Budapest)
21	MF	GER	Khaled Narey (to Hamburger SV)
24	GK	HUN	Balázs Megyeri (to Atromitos)
35	DF	GER	Dominik Schad (to 1. FC Kaiserslautern)
—	DF	GER	Stephen Sama (to Heracles Almelo, previously on loan at VfL Osnabrück)

=== Erzgebirge Aue ===
In:

No.	Pos.	Nation	Player
6	DF	GER	Luke Hemmerich (from Schalke 04, previously on loan at VfL Bochum)
7	MF	GER	Jan Hochscheidt (from Eintracht Braunschweig)
8	MF	GER	Tom Baumgart (from Chemnitzer FC)
9	FW	GER	Emmanuel Iyoha (on loan from Fortuna Düsseldorf, previously on loan at VfL Osnabrück)
12	DF	GER	Steve Breitkreuz (from Eintracht Braunschweig)
14	FW	RUS	Maximilian Pronichev (on loan from Hertha BSC)
30	MF	GER	Elias Löder (from Erzgebirge Aue youth)
35	GK	GER	Maximilian Schlosser (from Erzgebirge Aue youth)
36	DF	SRB	Filip Kusić (from 1. FC Köln II)
38	MF	GER	Robert Herrmann (from SV Sandhausen)

Out:

No.	Pos.	Nation	Player
3	DF	GER	Sebastian Hertner (to Darmstadt 98)
6	MF	MNE	Mirnes Pepić (to Hansa Rostock)
8	FW	GER	Nicky Adler (to 1. FC Lokomotive Leipzig)
14	FW	GER	Pascal Köpke (to Hertha BSC)
19	FW	GER	Cebio Soukou (to Hansa Rostock)
37	DF	COD	Moise Ngwisani (to Borussia Mönchengladbach II)

=== 1. FC Magdeburg ===
In:

No.	Pos.	Nation	Player
1	GK	BIH	Jasmin Fejzić (from Eintracht Braunschweig)
5	DF	GER	Tobias Müller (from Hallescher FC)
18	MF	SRB	Aleksandar Ignjovski (from SC Freiburg)
20	DF	GER	Joel Abu Hanna (from 1. FC Kaiserslautern)
21	MF	GER	Rico Preißinger (from VfR Aalen)
22	MF	GHA	Manfred Osei (from 1. FC Kaiserslautern)
26	FW	GER	Marius Bülter (from SV Rödinghausen)
37	FW	GER	Mërgim Berisha (on loan from Red Bull Salzburg, previously on loan at LASK Linz)

Out:

No.	Pos.	Nation	Player
1	GK	GER	Jan Glinker (to Wacker Nordhausen)
4	DF	GER	Leon Heynke (on loan to VfB Germania Halberstadt)
5	DF	GER	Felix Schiller (to VfL Osnabrück)
15	MF	GER	Tobias Schwede (to SC Paderborn 07)
17	MF	POL	Marius Sowislo (retired)
21	FW	GER	Julius Düker (to SC Paderborn 07)
22	DF	CAN	André Hainault (to 1. FC Kaiserslautern)
—	GK	GER	Lukas Cichos (to Rot-Weiß Erfurt, previously on loan at FSV Zwickau)

=== SC Paderborn 07 ===
In:

No.	Pos.	Nation	Player
2	DF	GER	Uwe Hünemeier (from Brighton & Hove Albion)
3	DF	GER	Sascha Heil (from SC Paderborn 07 youth)
7	FW	GER	Marlon Ritter (from Fortuna Düsseldorf, previously on loan)
8	MF	GER	Klaus Gjasula (from Hallescher FC)
9	FW	GER	Julius Düker (from 1. FC Magdeburg)
16	FW	GRE	Philippos Selkos (from SC Paderborn 07 youth)
18	FW	TUR	Sergio Gucciardo (from SC Paderborn 07 youth)
19	MF	GER	Tobias Schwede (from 1. FC Magdeburg)
24	MF	HUN	Olivér Schindler (from SC Paderborn 07 youth)
25	MF	TUN	Mohamed Dräger (on loan from SC Freiburg)
34	GK	GER	Leon Brüggemeier (from Hertha BSC II)
37	FW	GHA	Bernard Tekpetey (from FC Schalke 04)
39	MF	GER	Sebastian Vasiliadis (from VfR Aalen)
—	FW	GER	Luca Pfeiffer (from Stuttgarter Kickers)

Out:

No.	Pos.	Nation	Player
9	FW	AUS	Kwame Yeboah (loan return to Borussia Mönchengladbach)
19	FW	GER	Marc Vucinovic (released)
20	DF	GER	Pascal Itter (to Chemnitzer FC)
26	MF	GER	Ron Schallenberg (on loan to SC Verl)
28	GK	GER	Till Brinkmann (to VfB Germania Halberstadt)
32	MF	GER	Darryl Geurts (to Rot-Weiß Erfurt)
—	FW	GER	Luca Pfeiffer (on loan to VfL Osnabrück)
—	MF	GER	Aykut Soyak (to Viktoria Berlin, previously on loan at SV Elversberg)
—	FW	GER	Timo Mauer (to Chemnitzer FC, previously on loan at FC Carl Zeiss Jena)
—	MF	GER	Christian Bickel (to FSV Zwickau, previously on loan at VfL Osnabrück)

== See also ==
- 2018–19 Bundesliga
- 2018–19 2. Bundesliga
