= Piossek =

Piossek is a surname. Notable people with the surname include:

- Marcus Piossek (born 1989), Polish-German footballer
- José María Núñez Piossek (born 1976), Argentine rugby union player
