= Lukas Hoffmann =

Lukas Hoffmann may refer to:

- Lukas Hoffmann (canoeist) (born 1984), German canoeist
- Lukas Hoffmann (footballer) (born 1997), German footballer

== See also ==
- Luc Hoffmann (1923–2016), Swiss ornithologist, conservationist, and philanthropist
