= Menig =

Menig is a surname. Notable people with the surname include:

- Fabian Menig (born 1994), German footballer
- Queensy Menig (born 1995), Dutch footballer
