= Roope Riski =

Finnish footballer (born 1991)

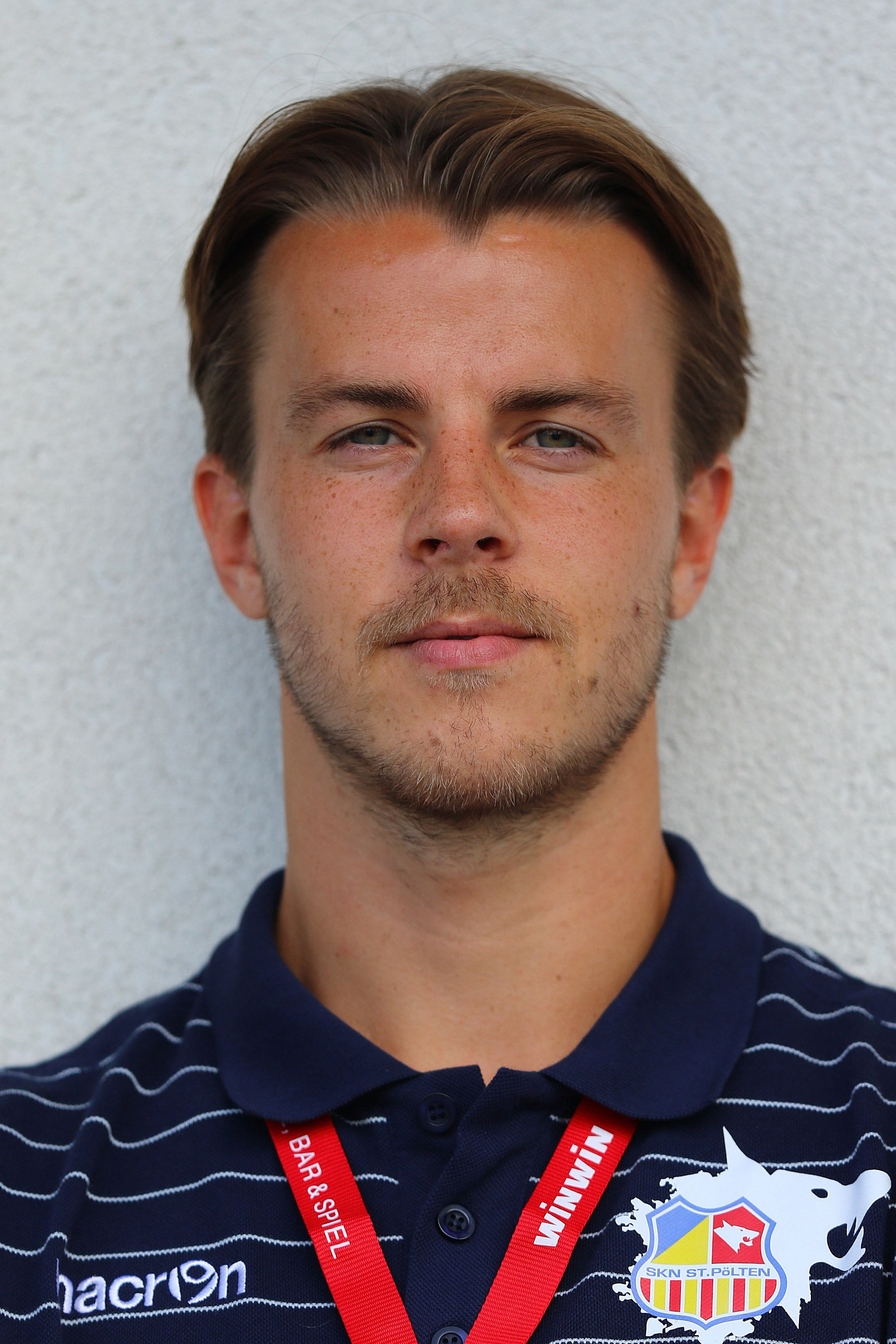
- Riski with St. Pölten in 2018

Personal information
- Full name: Roope Vilhelmi Riski
- Date of birth: 16 August 1991 (age 35)
- Place of birth: Askainen, Finland
- Height: 1.80 m (5 ft 11 in)
- Position: Forward

Team information
- Current team: Ilves
- Number: 10

Youth career
- MaPS
- TPS

Senior career*
Years	Team	Apps	(Gls)
2009–2011	TPS	18	(12)
2010	→ Viikingit (loan)	6	(5)
2010	→ ÅIFK (loan)	9	(12)
2011–2014	Cesena	1	(0)
2011	→ TPS (loan)	11	(4)
2012	→ Hønefoss (loan)	1	(0)
2012–2014	→ TPS (loan)	35	(8)
2014–2015	Hønefoss	23	(12)
2015–2016	Haugesund	10	(0)
2015–2016	→ SJK (loan)	13	(8)
2016–2017	SJK	33	(17)
2017	→ SC Paderborn (loan)	10	(1)
2017–2019	St. Pölten	33	(5)
2018–2019	→ PAE Chania (loan)	22	(7)
2020–2023	HJK	54	(22)
2024–	Ilves	67	(26)

International career^{‡}
2010–2012	Finland U21	11	(6)
2015–	Finland	8	(1)
- * Club domestic league appearances and goals as of 27 July 2026 ‡ National team caps and goals as of 31 December 2021

Roope Vilhelmi Riski (born 16 August 1991) is a Finnish professional footballer who plays as a forward for Veikkausliiga club Ilves.

Roope is a forward who has accomplished several things in his career. In the middle of the 2010 season, Riski was selected to the opening squad for the first time of his career. Since then he has enjoyed his season, starting 12 games and scoring 11 goals. He has the best game/goal ratio in the Veikkausliiga.

== Club career ==
=== TPS ===
Riski started football in the youth sector of Maskun Palloseura, and later joined Turun Palloseura. He made his senior debut with TPS in Veikkausliiga in the 2010 season. On 22 September 2010, Riski scored a hat-trick for TPS against AC Oulu. By doing this, he became the first ever player in Finland to score a hat-trick in all the highest three levels of Finnish football system during one season, as he had loan stints with Viikingit in Ykkönen and Åbo IFK in Kakkonen during 2020.

=== Cesena and loans ===
On 27 January 2011, he was announced as the Cesena player in Italian Serie A. The transfer fee was reported to be €750.000. He made his Serie A debut on 19 March 2011 against Lazio on Stadio Olimpico (1−0 away loss) as a 69th-minute substitute for Fabio Caserta, he has had loan spell in Finland for TPS Turku in 2012 and Hønefoss BK in Norway. In August 2012, Riski joined English side Derby County on trial ahead of their pre-season against Chesterfield, where he started in a 3–1 loss, he scored in a reserve friendly against Matlock Town.

=== SJK Seinäjoki ===
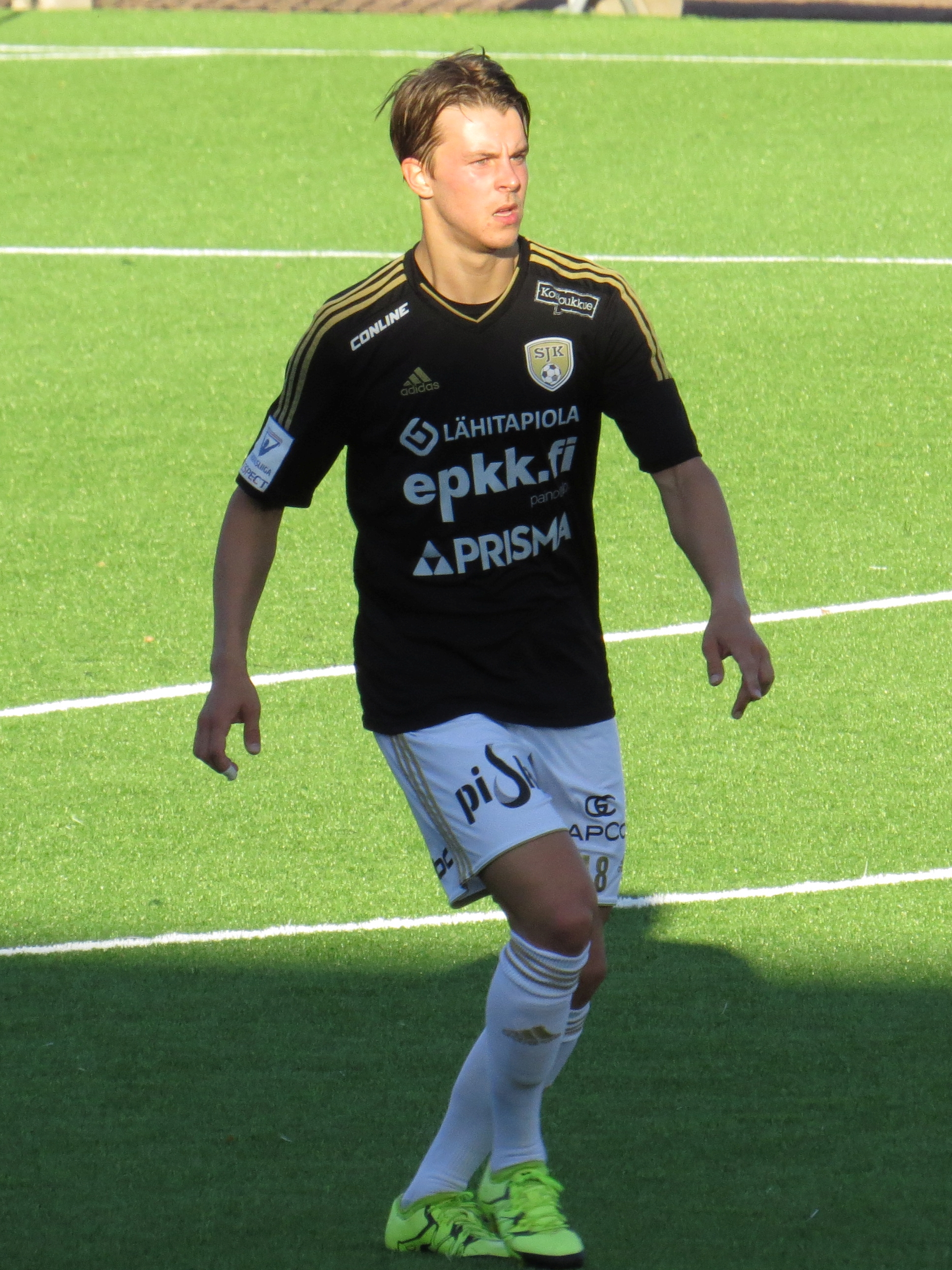
Riski with SJK Seinäjoki in 2015

On 8 February 2016, SJK announced the signing of Riski on a two-year contract. Riski was the top goal scorer in Veikkausliiga in 2016.

On 10 January 2017, he was loaned to SC Paderborn in German 3. Liga.

=== St. Pölten ===
In June 2017, Riski left SJK when he signed with Austrian Bundesliga club St. Pölten for an undisclosed fee.

On 28 August 2018, Riski was loaned out to Greek club AO Chania − Kissamikos.

=== HJK Helsinki ===
On 21 November 2019, HJK Helsinki confirmed the signing of Riski on a contract until the end of 2021 with an option for one further year. He was crowned the Veikkausliiga top goal scorer again in 2020. During the 2022 and 2023 season, he suffered from knee injuries and missed several months.

=== Ilves ===
On 6 November 2023, it was announced that Riski had signed with Veikkausliiga club Ilves on a two-year deal, starting in 2024. During his first season with Ilves, Riski scored 11 goals in 26 Veikkausliiga appearances.

== International career ==
On 19 January 2015, Riski made his senior debut for the Finland national team in a 1–0 friendly against Sweden, where he scored the only goal of the match.

He was called up for the UEFA Euro 2020 pre-tournament friendly match against Sweden on 29 May 2021.

== Personal life ==
He is the younger brother of former Finnish international footballer Riku Riski.

Since 2019, Riski has abstained from drinking alcohol. He has also revealed his devotion for poetry.

== Career statistics ==
=== Club ===
As of 9 May 2025

Appearances and goals by club, season and competition
Club	Season	League			National cup (Note: Includes Finnish Cup, Austrian Cup and Greek Cup)		League cup (Note: Includes Finnish League Cup and Westphalian Cup)		Europe		Total	
Club	Season	Division	Apps	Goals	Apps	Goals	Apps	Goals	Apps	Goals	Apps	Goals
TPS	2010	Veikkausliiga	18	12	1	0	6	3	4 (Note: Appearances in UEFA Europa League)	1	29	16
Viikingit (loan)	2010	Ykkönen	6	5	0	0	–		–		6	5
Åbo IFK (loan)	2010	Kakkonen	9	12	0	0	–		–		9	12
Cesena	2010–11	Serie A	1	0	0	0	–		–		1	0
TPS (loan)	2011	Veikkausliiga	11	5	0	0	0	0	–		11	5
Hønefoss (loan)	2012	Tippeligaen	1	0	0	0	–		–		1	0
TPS (loan)	2012	Veikkausliiga	7	1	0	0	0	0	–		7	1
TPS (loan)	2013	Veikkausliiga	27	7	0	0	6	2	2	1	35	10
TPS (loan)	Total		34	8	0	0	6	2	2	1	42	11
Hønefoss	2014	1. divisjon	24	12	0	0	–		–		24	12
Haugesund	2015	Tippeligaen	10	0	0	0	–		–		10	0
SJK Seinäjoki	2015	Veikkausliiga	13	8	0	0	0	0	–		13	8
SJK Seinäjoki	2016	Veikkausliiga	33	17	4	3	5	4	2 (Note: Appearances in UEFA Champions League)	1	44	25
SJK Seinäjoki	2017	Veikkausliiga	0	0	0	0	–		0	0	0	0
SJK Seinäjoki	Total		46	25	4	3	5	4	2	1	57	33
SC Paderborn (loan)	2016–17	3. Liga	10	1	0	0	–		–		10	1
SC Paderborn II (loan)	2016–17	Oberliga Westfalen	1	1	–		1	0	–		2	1
St. Pölten	2017–18	Austrian Bundesliga	25	5	1	1	–		–		26	6
St. Pölten	2018–19	Austrian Bundesliga	0	0	0	0	–		–		0	0
St. Pölten	2019–20	Austrian Bundesliga	8	0	2	0	–		–		10	0
St. Pölten	Total		33	5	3	1	0	0	0	0	36	6
Chania (loan)	2018–19	Football League Greece	22	7	5	3	–		–		27	10
HJK	2020	Veikkausliiga	20	16	9	3	–		–		29	19
HJK	2021	Veikkausliiga	24	6	6	5	–		14 (Note: Four appearances and four goals in UEFA Champions League, four appearances and four goals in UEFA Europa League and six appearances and one goal in UEFA Europa Conference League)	9	42	20
HJK	2022	Veikkausliiga	2	0	2	1	3	4	0	0	7	5
HJK	2023	Veikkausliiga	8	0	1	0	0	0	3 (Note: Two appearances in UEFA Champions League and one appearance in UEFA Europa Conference League)	0	12	0
HJK	Total		54	22	18	9	3	4	17	9	92	44
Klubi 04	2023	Kakkonen	1	0	–		–		–		1	0
Ilves	2024	Veikkausliiga	26	11	1	0	4	1	4 (Note: Appearances in UEFA Conference League)	3	35	15
Ilves	2025	Veikkausliiga	6	3	0	0	6	0	0	0	12	4
Ilves	Total		32	14	1	0	10	1	4	3	47	18
Career total			316	129	33	16	30	14	29	15	408	174

=== International ===
As of match played 12 October 2021

Finland
Year	Apps	Goals
2015	2	1
2016	3	0
2017	0	0
2018	0	0
2019	0	0
2020	0	0
2021	3	0
Total	8	1

=== International goals ===
Scores and results list Finland's goal tally first, score column indicates score after each Riski goal.

List of international goals scored by Roope Riski
No.	Date	Venue	Opponent	Score	Result	Competition	Ref.
1	19 January 2015	Zayed Sports City Stadium, Abu Dhabi, United Arab Emirates	Sweden	1–0	1–0	Friendly	

== Honours ==
SJK

- Veikkausliiga: 2015

HJK

- Veikkausliiga: 2020, 2021, 2022, 2023
- Finnish Cup: 2020

Ilves

- Veikkausliiga runner-up: 2024

Individual

- Finnish League Cup Top goalscorer: 2016
- Veikkausliiga Player of the Month:August 2010, June 2016, October 2020
- Veikkausliiga Player of the Year: 2020
- Veikkausliiga Striker of the Year: 2020
- Veikkausliiga Team of the Year: 2016, 2020
- Veikkausliiga Top score: 2016, 2020
