= Robin Krauße =

German footballer

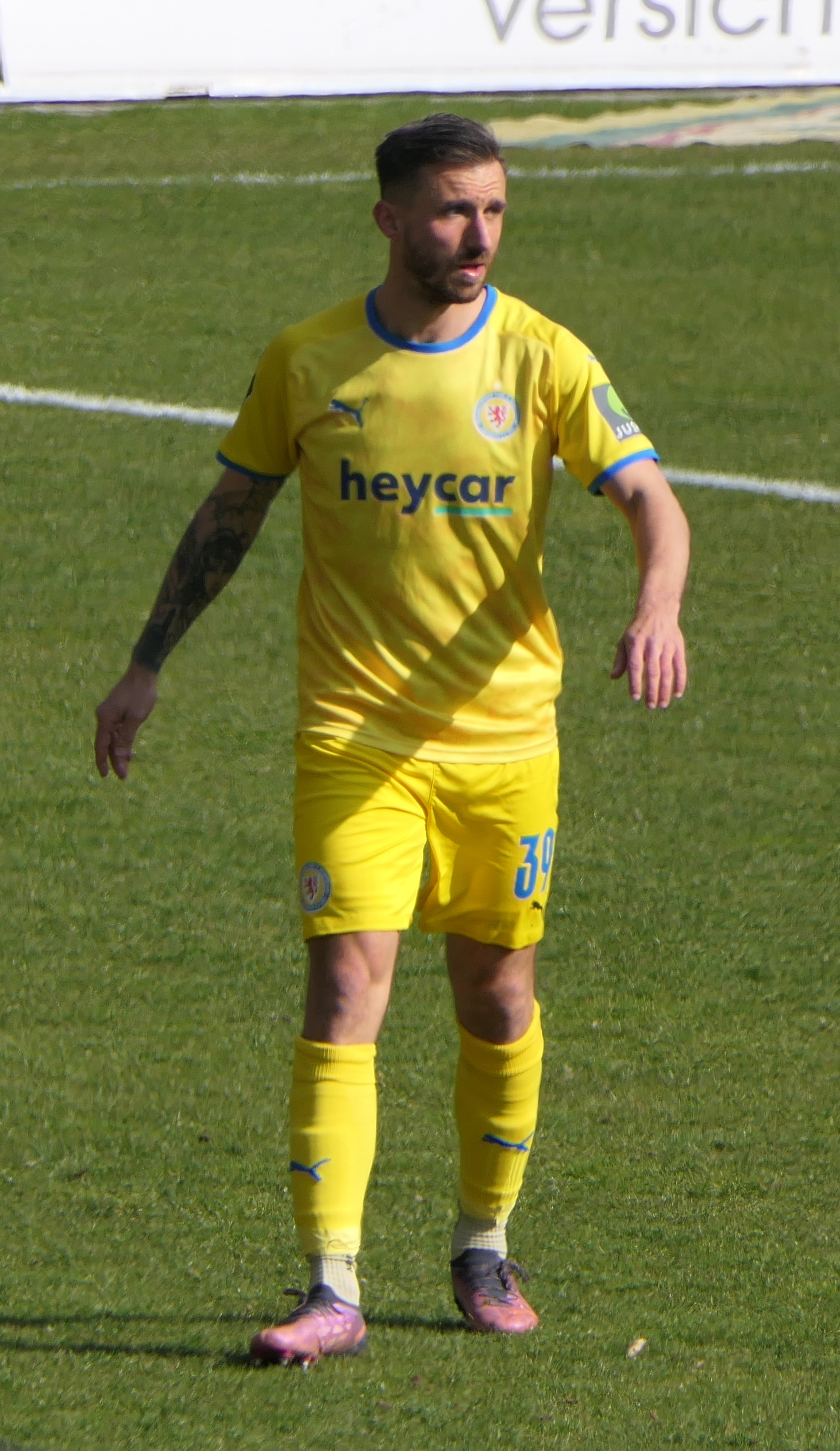
- Krauße in 2023

Personal information
- Date of birth: 2 April 1994 (age 32)
- Place of birth: Jena, Germany
- Height: 1.78 m (5 ft 10 in)
- Position: Midfielder

Team information
- Current team: Kickers Offenbach
- Number: 39

Youth career
- 2010–2013: Hansa Rostock

Senior career*
Years	Team	Apps	(Gls)
2013–2015	Hansa Rostock	29	(0)
2013–2015	Hansa Rostock II	21	(0)
2015	Carl Zeiss Jena	17	(0)
2016–2018	SC Paderborn	80	(3)
2018–2021	FC Ingolstadt	78	(2)
2021–2025	Eintracht Braunschweig	117	(3)
2025–2026	SV Sandhausen	26	(1)
2026–	Kickers Offenbach	6	(0)
- * Club domestic league appearances and goals as of 24 September 2026

Robin Krauße (born 2 April 1994) is a German footballer who plays as a midfielder for Regionalliga Südwest club Kickers Offenbach.

== Career statistics ==
As of match played 3 August 2018

Appearances and goals by club, season and competition
Club	Season	League			DFB-Pokal		Other		Total	
Club	Season	Division	Apps	Goals	Apps	Goals	Apps	Goals	Apps	Goals
Hansa Rostock	2013–14	3. Liga	11	0	0	0	—		11	0
Hansa Rostock	2014–15	3. Liga	19	0	0	0	—		19	0
Hansa Rostock	Total		30	0	0	0	0	0	30	0
Carl Zeiss Jena	2015–16	Regionalliga Nordost	17	0	2	0	—		19	0
Paderborn 07	2015–16	2. Bundesliga	9	0	0	0	—		9	0
Paderborn 07	2016–17	3. Liga	34	0	1	0	—		35	0
Paderborn 07	2017–18	3. Liga	36	3	4	0	—		40	3
Paderborn 07	Total		79	3	5	0	0	0	84	3
Career total			126	3	7	0	0	0	133	2
