= Florian Ruck =

German footballer (born 1992)

Personal information
- Full name: Florian Ruck
- Date of birth: 6 February 1992 (age 34)
- Place of birth: Bad Mergentheim, Germany
- Height: 1.86 m (6 ft 1 in)
- Position: Defender

Youth career
- 2007–2008: FSV Hollenbach
- 2008–2010: TSG 1899 Hoffenheim

Senior career*
Years	Team	Apps	(Gls)
2010–2015	TSG 1899 Hoffenheim II	87	(0)
2015–2017	SC Paderborn 07	11	(0)
- * Club domestic league appearances and goals as of 1 July 2017

Florian Ruck (born 6 February 1992) is a German footballer who plays as a defender and is currently a free agent.
