= Ben Zolinski =

German footballer

Personal information
- Date of birth: 3 May 1992 (age 34)
- Place of birth: Berlin, Germany
- Height: 1.81 m (5 ft 11 in)
- Positions: Striker; right winger; right-back

Youth career
- SV Möllenhagen/Bocksee
- –2006: 1. FC Neubrandenburg 04
- 2006–2011: Hansa Rostock

Senior career*
Years	Team	Apps	(Gls)
2010–2013	Hansa Rostock II	18	(1)
2012–2013	Hansa Rostock	11	(0)
2011–2012	→ Carl Zeiss Jena II (loan)	12	(0)
2013–2014	Union Berlin II	18	(1)
2014–2016	TSG Neustrelitz	56	(8)
2016–2020	SC Paderborn	125	(23)
2020–2022	Erzgebirge Aue	54	(6)
2022–2024	1. FC Kaiserslautern	20	(0)
- * Club domestic league appearances and goals as of 22:29, 3 July 2024 (UTC)

Ben Zolinski (born 3 May 1992) is a German professional footballer who plays as a right winger.

== Career ==
In May 2016 Zolinski joined SC Paderborn 07 on a three-year contract from TSG Neustrelitz.

In September 2020, having been released by SC Paderborn upon the expiration of his contract in July, Zolinski moved to 2. Bundesliga side FC Erzgebirge Aue. He signed a three-year contract.

== Style of play ==
Before his move to SC Paderborn, Zolinski was deployed as a right-back but then started playing as a striker.
