= Niko Dobros =

German-Greek footballer

Personal information
- Full name: Nikolaos Dobros
- Date of birth: 24 May 1993 (age 33)
- Place of birth: Filderstadt, Germany
- Height: 1.79 m (5 ft 10 in)
- Position: Midfielder

Team information
- Current team: FSV 08 Bissingen
- Number: 11

Youth career
- TSV Nussdorf
- VfB Stuttgart
- 1. FC Nürnberg
- –2012: Ingolstadt 04

Senior career*
| Years | Team | Apps | (Gls) |
| 2012–2014 | Ingolstadt 04 II | 24 | (2) |
| 2014–2015 | FC Nöttingen | 31 | (7) |
| 2015–2016 | Kickers Offenbach | 31 | (10) |
| 2016–2017 | SC Paderborn | 5 | (0) |
| 2017 | → SV Elversberg (loan) | 14 | (4) |
| 2017–2018 | F91 Dudelange | 7 | (2) |
| 2018–2019 | Wormatia Worms | 20 | (2) |
| 2019–2020 | VfR Aalen | 20 | (4) |
| 2020–2021 | Stuttgarter Kickers | 9 | (2) |
| 2021–2024 | FC Nöttingen | 97 | (53) |
| 2024– | FSV 08 Bissingen | 0 | (0) |
- * Club domestic league appearances and goals as of 26 July 2024

Nikolaos Dobros (born 24 May 1993) is a German-Greek footballer who plays as a midfielder for FSV 08 Bissingen.
