= Marc-André Kruska =

German footballer (born 1987)

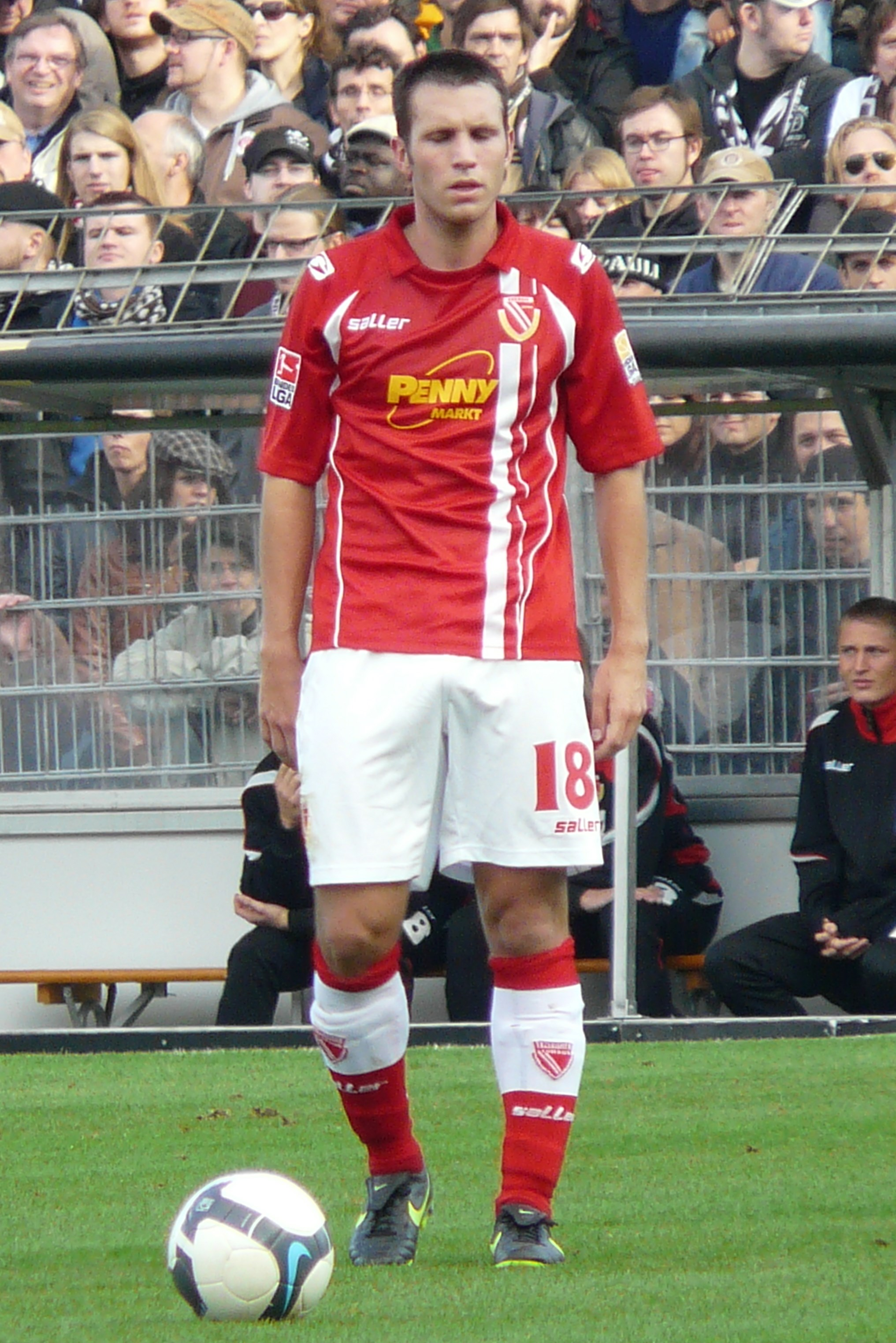
- Kruska playing for Energie Cottbus in 2009

Personal information
- Date of birth: 29 June 1987 (age 39)
- Place of birth: Castrop-Rauxel, West Germany
- Height: 1.78 m (5 ft 10 in)
- Position: Midfielder

Team information
- Current team: VfL Bochum (U19 assistant)

Youth career
- 1994–1995: SC Arminia Ickern
- 1996–1999: VfR Rauxel
- 1999–2004: Borussia Dortmund

Senior career*
Years	Team	Apps	(Gls)
2004–2009	Borussia Dortmund II	5	(4)
2004–2008	Borussia Dortmund	107	(2)
2009	Club Brugge	15	(0)
2009–2014	Energie Cottbus	153	(13)
2014–2016	FSV Frankfurt	63	(0)
2016–2018	SC Paderborn	32	(2)
2017–2018	SC Paderborn II	8	(0)
2018	Werder Bremen II	15	(2)
2018–2019	Dudelange	13	(2)
Total		411	(25)

International career
2006–2009	Germany U21	16	(2)

Managerial career
- 2019–: VfL Bochum (U19 assistant)
- * Club domestic league appearances and goals

Marc-André Kruska (born 29 June 1987) is a German professional footballer who played as a midfielder. He is the assistant head coach of VfL Bochum's U19 squad and assistant manager of Bundesliga club VfL Bochum.

== Career ==
Born in Castrop-Rauxel, North Rhine-Westphalia, Kruska started his career at SC Arminia Ickern and soon signed for VfR Rauxel 08, the team from his native village. In 1999, age 12, he was spotted by Borussia Dortmund and at the Westfalen Stadium he enjoyed his further training. Just 17, he made his debut in the first team against Kaiserslautern in 2004–05. On the final match day of that season, he scored his first goal against Hansa Rostock, making him the fourth youngest scorer ever in the history of the Bundesliga. As the best U18 player, he was also awarded the "Fritz Walter Medal".

The three following seasons confirmed his place in the starting line-up as defensive midfielder, bringing his total number of Bundesliga games to 98. After a half year and fifteen games in the Jupiler League for Club Brugge, he returned to Germany signing a three-year contract with FC Energie Cottbus on 28 July 2009.

On 3 January 2014, he joined FSV Frankfurt.

In January 2018, Kruska left SC Paderborn 07 for league rivals Werder Bremen II. In May, following Werder Bremen II's relegation from the 3. Liga, it was announced Kruska would be one of ten players to leave the club.

In June 2018, Kruska joined reigning Luxembourg champions F91 Dudelange. He retired after the 2018–19 season.

== Later career ==
Following his retirement as a player, Kruska became assistant coach of a VfL Bochum's U19 squad. Beside that, he joined FC Frohlinde as a player.

== Honours ==
Borussia Dortmund

- DFB-Pokal runner-up: 2007–08

Individual

- Fritz-Walter-Medal 2005 in Gold (Category U18)
