= Fabian Stenzel =

German footballer

Personal information
- Date of birth: 7 October 1986 (age 40)
- Place of birth: Lüneburg, West Germany
- Height: 1.74 m (5 ft 8 1/2 in)
- Positions: Defender; midfielder

Team information
- Current team: ZFC Meuselwitz
- Number: 22

Youth career
- –2003: Lüneburger SK

Senior career*
Years	Team	Apps	(Gls)
2003–2007	Lüneburger SK		
2007–2011	Rot-Weiß Erfurt	117	(3)
2011–2017	Chemnitzer FC	177	(3)
2017–	ZFC Meuselwitz	19	(0)
- * Club domestic league appearances and goals as of 08:01, 14 February 2018 (UTC)

Fabian Stenzel (born 7 October 1986) is a German footballer who plays for ZFC Meuselwitz.
