= Jonas Brammen =

German footballer

Personal information
- Date of birth: 19 July 1997 (age 29)
- Place of birth: Hagen, Germany
- Height: 1.87 m (6 ft 2 in)
- Position: Goalkeeper

Team information
- Current team: TuS Erndtebrück
- Number: 35

Youth career
- Eintracht Hohenlimburg
- SC Berchum/Garenfeld
- –2013: Rot Weiss Ahlen
- 2013–2015: SC Paderborn

Senior career*
Years	Team	Apps	(Gls)
2015–2017	SC Paderborn II	35	(0)
2015–2017	SC Paderborn	1	(0)
2018	Gütersloh	15	(0)
2018–2020	1. FC Kaan-Marienborn	11	(0)
2020	Sportfreunde Lotte	0	(0)
2020–	TuS Erndtebrück	50	(0)
- * Club domestic league appearances and goals as of 19 November 2022

Jonas Brammen (born 19 July 1997) is a German footballer who plays as a goalkeeper for TuS Erndtebrück.
