= Christian Strohdiek =

German footballer

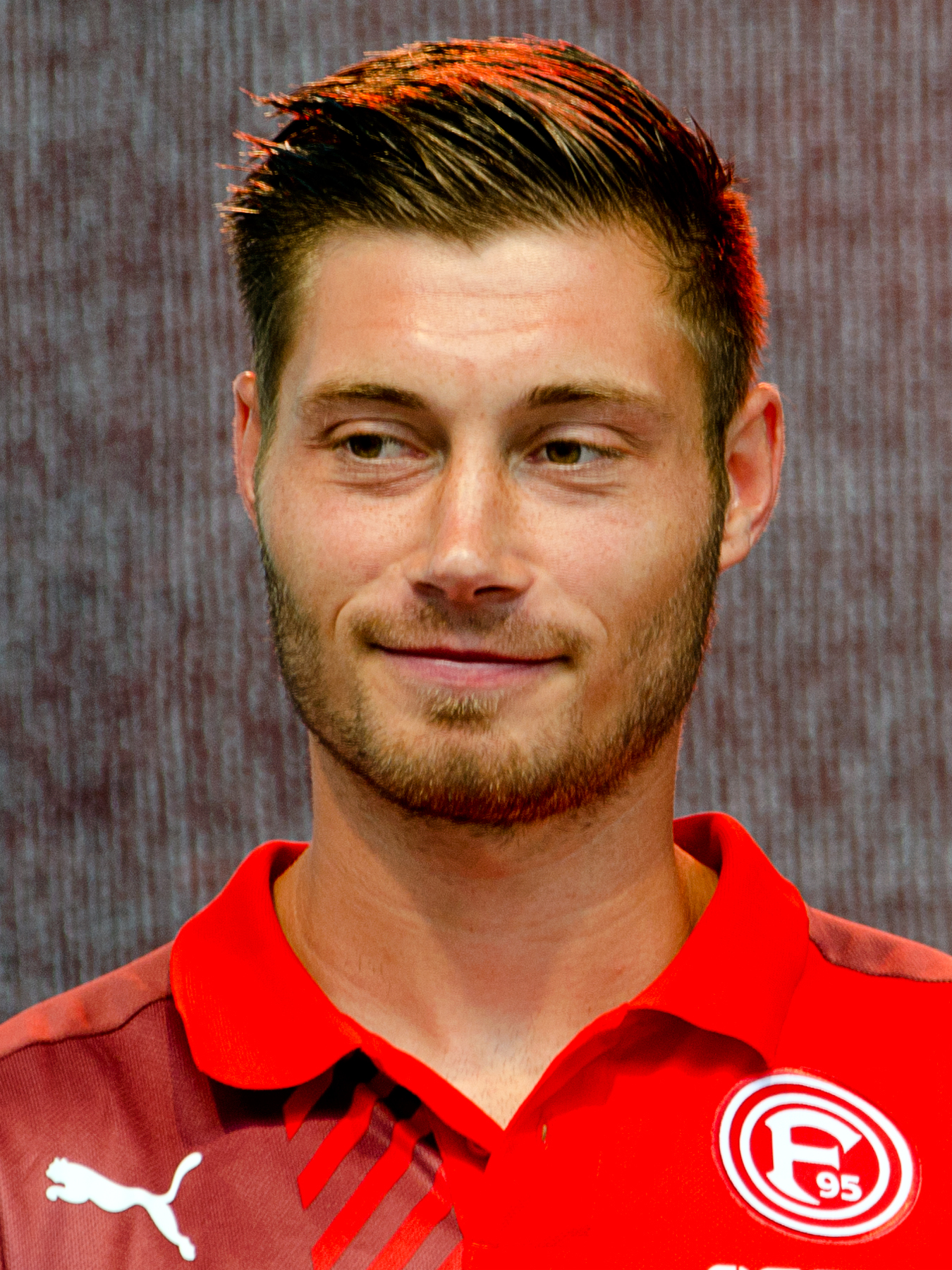
- Strohdiek with Fortuna Düsseldorf in 2015

Personal information
- Date of birth: 22 January 1988 (age 38)
- Place of birth: Paderborn, West Germany
- Height: 1.92 m (6 ft 4 in)
- Position: Centre-back

Team information
- Current team: SC Paderborn II
- Number: 4

Youth career
- 1994–2000: TuRa Elsen
- 2000–2007: SC Paderborn

Senior career*
Years	Team	Apps	(Gls)
2007–2015	SC Paderborn	141	(3)
2015–2016	Fortuna Düsseldorf	17	(0)
2016–2021	SC Paderborn	106	(5)
2021–2022	Würzburger Kickers	37	(1)
2022–	SC Paderborn II	11	(3)
- * Club domestic league appearances and goals as of 13 November 2022

Christian Strohdiek (born 22 January 1988) is a German professional footballer who plays as a centre-back for SC Paderborn II.

== Club career ==
In May 2022, following relegation from the 3. Liga with Würzburger Kickers Strohdiek announced his retirement from playing. However, he returned for the 2022–23 season, joining SC Paderborn II in the fifth-tier Oberliga Westfalen.
