= Thomas Bertels =

German footballer

Personal information
- Date of birth: 5 November 1986 (age 39)
- Place of birth: Geseke, West Germany
- Height: 1.93 m (6 ft 4 in)
- Positions: Left-back; left midfielder

Team information
- Current team: Schalke 04 (U17 manager)

Youth career
- –2005: TuS Ehringhausen
- 2005–2007: SuS Bad Westernkotten
- 2007–2008: RW Horn

Senior career*
Years	Team	Apps	(Gls)
2008–2009	SV Lippstadt		
2009–2011	SC Verl	61	(11)
2011–2019	SC Paderborn	149	(8)
2014–2019	SC Paderborn II	149	(8)
2019–2020	TuS Ehringhausen	13	(1)
2021–2023	VfB Schloß Holte	37	(21)

Managerial career
- 2018–2022: SC Paderborn (youth coach)
- 2022–2023: SC Paderborn II
- 2023–: Schalke 04 (U17 manager)
- * Club domestic league appearances and goals

Thomas Bertels (born 5 November 1986) is a German former professional footballer who played either as a left-back or as a left midfielder, and current manager of Schalke 04's U17 squad.

== Coaching career ==
In January 2019, Bertels retired as a professional player.

In July 2018, Bertels became co-coach of SC Paderborn's U19s while still playing for the club's reserve team. In 2019, he became coach of Paderborn U16s while playing for lower-league team TuS Ehringhausen.

On 24 February 2022, Bertels took over Paderborn's reserve team in the Oberliga Westfalen, succeeding Michél Kniat, who moved to third-division club SC Verl. During this time, he played for lower-league side VfB Schloß Holte. After promotion to the Regionalliga West, he left Paderborn a year before the end of his contract to take over Schalke 04's U17s.
