= Tim Mannek =

German footballer

Personal information
- Full name: Tim Mannek
- Date of birth: 21 May 1997 (age 29)
- Place of birth: Versmold, Germany
- Height: 1.91 m (6 ft 3 in)
- Position: Forward

Team information
- Current team: SC Paderborn II
- Number: 18

Youth career
- –2013: VfL Theesen
- 2013–2016: SC Paderborn

Senior career*
Years	Team	Apps	(Gls)
2016–	SC Paderborn	6	(0)
2016–	SC Paderborn II	54	(20)
- * Club domestic league appearances and goals as of 10:55, 3 August 2018 (UTC)

Tim Mannek (born 21 May 1997) is a German footballer who plays as a forward for SC Paderborn II.
