= Tommy Grupe =

German professional footballer (born 1992)

Personal information
- Date of birth: 29 March 1992 (age 34)
- Place of birth: Rostock, Germany
- Height: 1.92 m (6 ft 4 in)
- Position: Defender

Youth career
- 1997–1999: FSV Kritzmow
- 1999–2011: Hansa Rostock

Senior career*
Years	Team	Apps	(Gls)
2011–2012	Hansa Rostock II	23	(2)
2012	Hansa Rostock	1	(0)
2012–2013	Preußen Münster	1	(0)
2013–	Hansa Rostock	93	(6)
2013–2018	→ Hansa Rostock II	5	(0)
2018–2024	VfB Lübeck	174	(25)

International career
2007	Germany U15	2	(0)
2007–2008	Germany U16	11	(1)
2008–2009	Germany U17	3	(0)
2009	Germany U18	2	(0)
- * Club domestic league appearances and goals

Tommy Grupe (born 29 March 1992) is a German former professional footballer who played as a defender.
