= André Dej =

Polish-German footballer

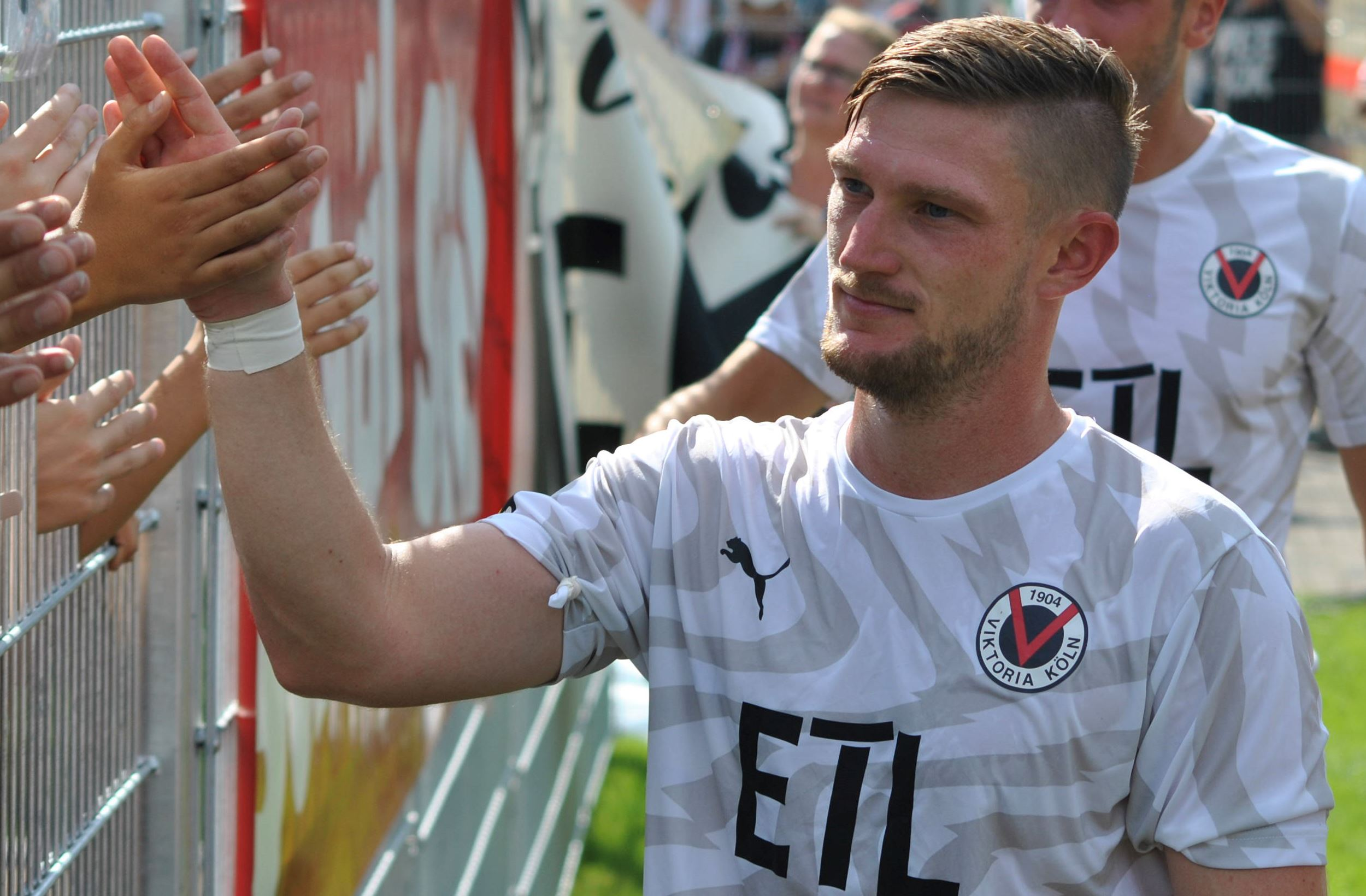
- Dej in 2019

Personal information
- Date of birth: 6 February 1992 (age 34)
- Place of birth: Cologne, Germany
- Height: 1.76 m (5 ft 9 in)
- Position: Midfielder

Team information
- Current team: SSV Homburg-Nümbrecht

Youth career
- –2008: Bayer Leverkusen
- 2008–2011: MSV Duisburg

Senior career*
Years	Team	Apps	(Gls)
2011–2012	MSV Duisburg II	34	(11)
2011–2012	Sportfreunde Siegen	66	(10)
2012–2015	Viktoria Köln	21	(0)
2015–2018	Sportfreunde Lotte	64	(11)
2018–2019	Jahn Regensburg	0	(0)
2019–2021	Viktoria Köln	26	(0)
2021–2022	Alemannia Aachen	17	(2)
2022	Fortuna Köln	15	(0)
2022–2023	Rot Weiss Ahlen	32	(7)
2023–2024	TuS Bövinghausen	15	(1)
2024–2026	Sportfreunde Siegen	58	(8)
2026–	SSV Homburg-Nümbrecht	0	(0)

International career
2010	Poland U18	1	(1)
2010–2011	Poland U19	7	(0)
- * Club domestic league appearances and goals as of 21:17, 1 June 2026 (UTC)

André Dej (born 6 February 1992) is a professional footballer who plays as a midfielder for SSV Homburg-Nümbrecht. Born in Germany, he represented Poland at youth international level.
