= Lukas Hoffmann (footballer) =

German footballer

Personal information
- Date of birth: 13 April 1997 (age 29)
- Place of birth: Homburg, Germany
- Height: 1.89 m (6 ft 2 in)
- Position: Centre back

Team information
- Current team: FC 08 Homburg
- Number: 25

Youth career
- FC 08 Homburg
- –2013: 1. FC Saarbrücken
- 2013–2016: 1899 Hoffenheim

Senior career*
Years	Team	Apps	(Gls)
2016–2018	Sonnenhof Großaspach	12	(0)
2018–2020	SSV Ulm 1846	18	(2)
2020–2022	SGV Freiberg	50	(3)
2022–	FC 08 Homburg	12	(0)
- * Club domestic league appearances and goals as of 13 November 2022

Lukas Hoffmann (born 13 April 1997) is a German association football centre back for FC 08 Homburg.
