= Florian Hansch =

German footballer

Personal information
- Date of birth: 22 August 1995 (age 31)
- Place of birth: Zschopau, Germany
- Height: 1.82 m (6 ft 0 in)
- Position: Forward

Team information
- Current team: ZFC Meuselwitz
- Number: 22

Youth career
- 2004–2014: Chemnitzer FC

Senior career*
Years	Team	Apps	(Gls)
2014–2015	Chemnitzer FC II	76	(9)
2014–2018	Chemnitzer FC	28	(6)
2015–2016	→ FSV Budissa Bautzen (loan)	27	(2)
2018–2020	SV Sandhausen	3	(0)
2019	→ Wehen Wiesbaden (loan)	13	(3)
2019–2020	→ Hallescher FC (loan)	25	(1)
2021	VfB Auerbach	0	(0)
2021–	ZFC Meuselwitz	151	(45)
- * Club domestic league appearances and goals as of 22 June 2026

Florian Hansch (born 22 August 1995) is a German footballer who plays as a forward for ZFC Meuselwitz.
