= Pascal Itter =

German footballer

Personal information
- Date of birth: 3 April 1995 (age 31)
- Place of birth: Schwalmstadt, Germany
- Position: Right-back

Youth career
- 1999–2009: TV Schierling
- 2009–2013: 1. FC Nürnberg

Senior career*
Years	Team	Apps	(Gls)
2013	1. FC Nürnberg II	2	(0)
2013–2015	Schalke 04 II	18	(0)
2015–2016	SV Grödig	15	(0)
2016–2018	SC Paderborn	12	(0)
2017–2018	SC Paderborn II	14	(0)
2018–2020	Chemnitzer FC	65	(1)
2021–2022	Fortuna Köln	30	(0)
2022–2023	Rot Weiss Ahlen	16	(0)
2023–2024	FC Kray	0	(0)
- * Club domestic league appearances and goals as of 04:14, 4 July 2024 (UTC)

Pascal Itter (born 3 April 1995) is a German professional footballer who most recently played as a right-back for FC Kray.

== Career ==
Itter has played for 1. FC Nürnberg, FC Schalke 04, SV Grödig, SC Paderborn and Chemnitzer FC.

== Honours ==
Individual

- Fritz Walter Medal U17 Bronze: 2012
