= Aykut Soyak =

German footballer

Personal information
- Date of birth: 30 April 1995 (age 31)
- Place of birth: Paderborn, Germany
- Height: 1.79 m (5 ft 10 in)
- Position: Midfielder

Team information
- Current team: Sportfreunde Siegen
- Number: 27

Youth career
- –2006: SC GW Paderborn
- 2006–2014: SC Paderborn

Senior career*
Years	Team	Apps	(Gls)
2014–2017	SC Paderborn II	69	(12)
2017–2018	SC Paderborn	18	(3)
2018	→ SV Elversberg (loan)	5	(0)
2018–2019	Viktoria Berlin	21	(3)
2019–2020	Lokomotive Leipzig	19	(7)
2020–2021	Rot Weiss Ahlen	7	(1)
2021	SC Wiedenbrück	10	(0)
2022–	Sportfreunde Siegen	8	(2)
- * Club domestic league appearances and goals as of 13 November 2022

Aykut Soyak (born 30 April 1995) is a German footballer who plays as a midfielder for Sportfreunde Siegen.
