= Lukas Kruse =

German footballer

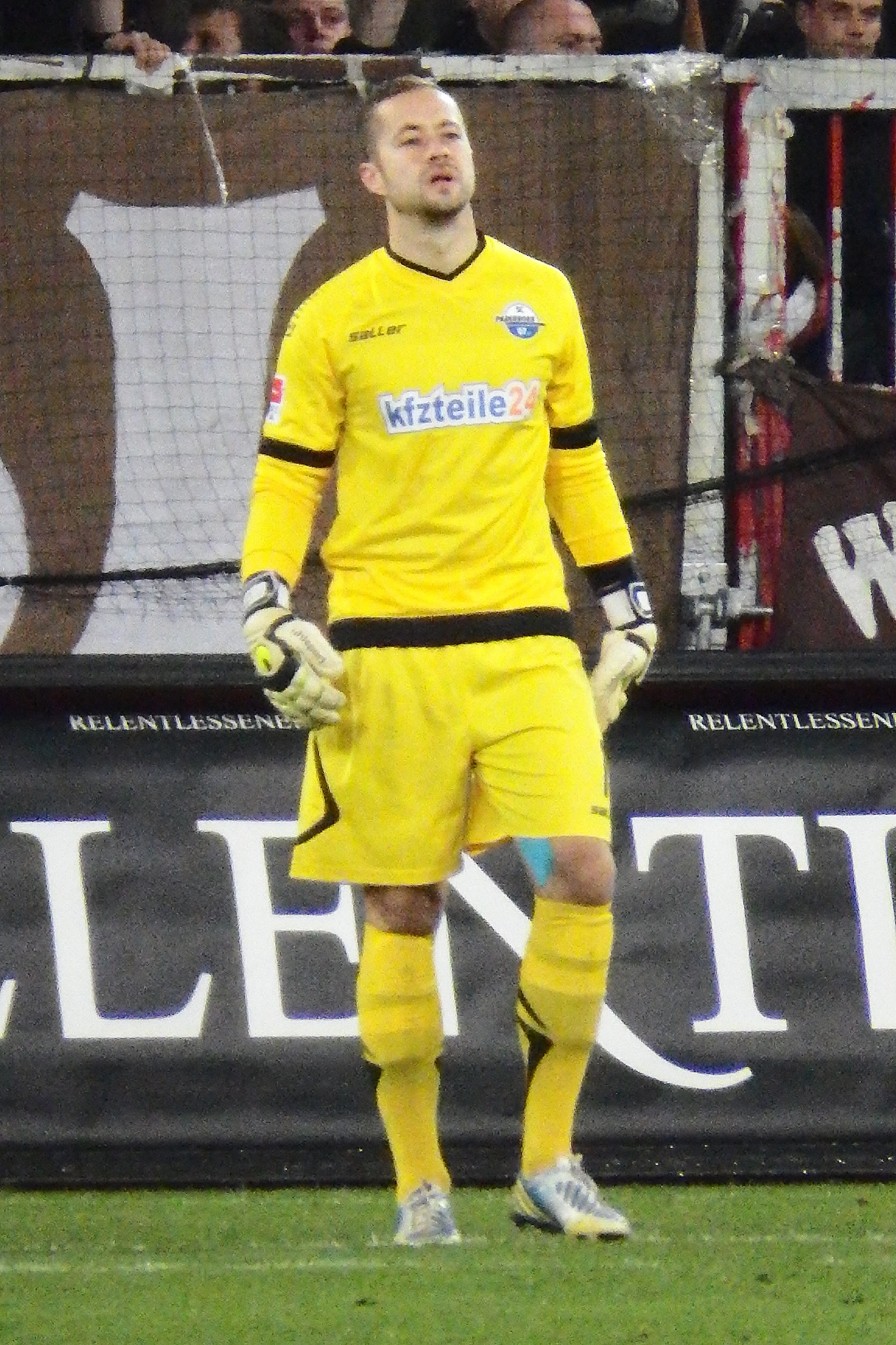
- Kruse playing for SC Paderborn in 2013

Personal information
- Date of birth: 9 July 1983 (age 43)
- Place of birth: Paderborn, West Germany
- Height: 1.84 m (6 ft 0 in)
- Position: Goalkeeper

Youth career
- TSV Tudorf
- –1995: Rot-Weiß Alfen
- 1995–2001: SC Paderborn

Senior career*
Years	Team	Apps	(Gls)
2001–2008	SC Paderborn	57	(0)
2008–2009	Borussia Dortmund II	15	(0)
2008–2009	Borussia Dortmund	0	(0)
2009–2010	FC Augsburg	4	(0)
2010–2017	SC Paderborn	187	(0)
2017–2018	Holstein Kiel	1	(0)
2018–2019	Eintracht Braunschweig	8	(0)
Total		272	(0)
- * Club domestic league appearances and goals

Lukas Kruse (born 9 July 1983) is a German former professional footballer who played as a goalkeeper.

== Career ==
Kruse signed with FC Augsburg in February 2009 after it was revealed that an injury to second choice goalkeeper Vasily Khomutovsky was to rule him out for the remainder of the season. On 20 April 2010, he announced his return to SC Paderborn 07, leaving FC Augsburg after one year.

In 2017, he transferred to 2. Bundesliga club Holstein Kiel after seven years with SC Paderborn 07.

== Career statistics ==
Appearances and goals by club, season and competition
Club	Season	League			DFB-Pokal		Europe		Other		Total	
Club	Season	Division	Apps	Goals	Apps	Goals	Apps	Goals	Apps	Goals	Apps	Goals
SC Paderborn	2001–02	Regionalliga Nord	2	0	0	0	—		—		2	0
SC Paderborn	2002–03	Regionalliga Nord	3	0	0	0	—		—		3	0
SC Paderborn	2003–04	Regionalliga Nord	8	0	—		—		0	0	8	0
SC Paderborn	2004–05	Regionalliga Nord	6	0	1	0	—		0	0	7	0
SC Paderborn	2005–06	2. Bundesliga	13	0	0	0	—		—		3	0
SC Paderborn	2006–07	2. Bundesliga	5	0	0	0	—		—		4	0
SC Paderborn	2007–08	2. Bundesliga	20	0	1	0	—		—		21	0
SC Paderborn	Total		57	0	2	0	—		0	0	59	0
Borussia Dortmund II	2008–09	Regionalliga West	15	0	—		—		—		15	0
Borussia Dortmund	2008–09	Bundesliga	0	0	0	0	0	0	—		0	0
FC Augsburg	2008–09	2. Bundesliga	1	0	—		—		—		1	0
FC Augsburg	2009–10	2. Bundesliga	3	0	0	0	—		0	0	3	0
FC Augsburg	Total		4	0	0	0	—		0	0	4	0
SC Paderborn	2010–11	2. Bundesliga	2	0	0	0	—		—		2	0
SC Paderborn	2011–12	2. Bundesliga	34	0	1	0	—		—		35	0
SC Paderborn	2012–13	2. Bundesliga	30	0	1	0	—		—		31	0
SC Paderborn	2013–14	2. Bundesliga	30	0	2	0	—		—		32	0
SC Paderborn	2014–15	Bundesliga	34	0	1	0	—		—		35	0
SC Paderborn	2015–16	2. Bundesliga	21	0	2	0	—		—		23	0
SC Paderborn	2016–17	3. Liga	36	0	1	0	—		—		37	0
SC Paderborn	Total		187	0	8	0	—		—		195	0
Holstein Kiel	2017–18	2. Bundesliga	1	0	0	0	—		0	0	1	0
Eintracht Braunschweig	2018–19	3. Liga	8	0	—		—		1	0	9	0
Career total			272	0	10	0	0	0	1	0	283	0
