= Fabian Menig =

German footballer

Personal information
- Date of birth: 26 February 1994 (age 32)
- Place of birth: Leutkirch im Allgäu, Germany
- Height: 1.87 m (6 ft 2 in)
- Positions: Right back; centre back

Team information
- Current team: 1. FC Nürnberg II
- Number: 5

Youth career
- –2007: FC Leutkirch
- 2007–2008: FV Ravensburg
- 2008–2013: SC Freiburg

Senior career*
Years	Team	Apps	(Gls)
2013–2017	SC Freiburg II	34	(3)
2015–2017	→ VfR Aalen (loan)	68	(3)
2017–2019	Preußen Münster	74	(2)
2019–2020	Admira Wacker	16	(0)
2020–2022	Hallescher FC	9	(0)
2022–	1. FC Nürnberg II	126	(10)
- * Club domestic league appearances and goals as of 27 September 2026

Fabian Menig (born 26 February 1994) is a German professional footballer who plays as a centre back or right back for 1. FC Nürnberg II.

== Club career ==
At the end of May 2019, Admira Wacker Mödling confirmed that they had signed Menig on a one-year contract.

On 21 January 2022, Menig moved to 1. FC Nürnberg II.
