= Marcus Piossek =

Professional footballer

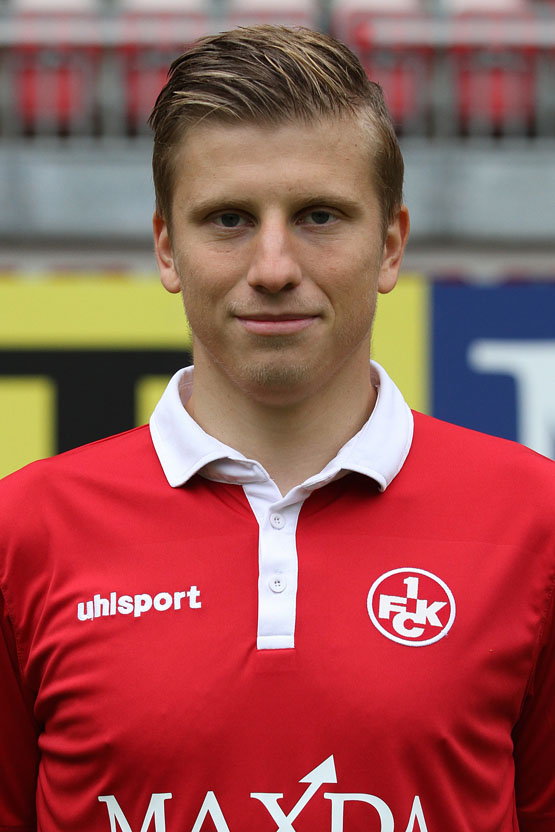
- Piossek with 1. FC Kaiserslautern in 2015

Personal information
- Date of birth: 21 July 1989 (age 37)
- Place of birth: Lippstadt, Germany
- Height: 1.78 m (5 ft 10 in)
- Position: Midfielder

Team information
- Current team: BV Herne-Süd
- Number: 9

Youth career
- –2004: SV Lippstadt
- 2004–2008: Borussia Dortmund

Senior career*
Years	Team	Apps	(Gls)
2006–2010	Borussia Dortmund II	57	(6)
2010–2011	Rot Weiss Ahlen	35	(7)
2011–2012	Karlsruher SC	0	(0)
2012–2013	VfL Osnabrück	36	(8)
2013–2015	Preußen Münster	72	(14)
2015–2016	1. FC Kaiserslautern	9	(2)
2015–2016	1. FC Kaiserslautern II	3	(0)
2016–2017	SC Paderborn	30	(3)
2017–2019	Sportfreunde Lotte	25	(2)
2019–2023	SV Meppen	70	(8)
2023	TuS Bövinghausen	16	(1)
2024	SC Westfalia Herne	30	(3)
2025–	BV Herne-Süd	34	(5)

International career
2009	Germany U20	1	(0)
2009	Poland U21	1	(0)
- * Club domestic league appearances and goals as of 21:31, 1 June 2026 (UTC)

Marcus Piossek (born 21 July 1989) is a professional footballer who plays as a midfielder for BV Herne-Süd. Born in Germany, he has represented both Germany and Poland at youth level.

== Club career ==
Born in Lippstadt, Piossek first played for SV Lippstadt 08 as a youth, before moving to Borussia Dortmund in 2004. From the 2006–07 season, he was sporadically deployed in the second senior team in the Regionalliga. On 25 July 2009, he made his professional debut in the 3. Liga in the season opener 4–3 defeat at Wacker Burghausen.

In June 2010, he moved to Rot Weiss Ahlen on a one-year contract. After 2010–11 season, he joined 2.Bundesliga club Karlsruher SC.

In 2017, Sportfreunde Lotte announced the signing of Piossek on a two-year contract from SC Paderborn.

== International career ==
In 2009 Piossek was appointed for the first time in a selection team of the German Football Association. He played one game for Germany under-20s against Switzerland, before switching his allegiance to Poland. On 17 November 2009, he made his single appearance for the Poland under-21 team against Romania.
