= Till Brinkmann =

German footballer

Personal information
- Date of birth: 1 November 1995 (age 31)
- Place of birth: Paderborn, Germany
- Height: 1.99 m (6 ft 6 in)
- Position: Goalkeeper

Youth career
- SC Paderborn
- BV Bad Lippspringe
- –2014: Arminia Bielefeld

Senior career*
Years	Team	Apps	(Gls)
2014–2015	SV Lippstadt	0	(0)
2015–2018	SC Paderborn II	54	(0)
2016–2018	SC Paderborn	1	(0)
2017	→ Eintracht Trier (loan)	0	(0)
2018–2019	Germania Halberstadt	6	(0)
2020	SC Paderborn II	3	(0)
2020–2021	SC Verl	3	(0)
2021–2022	Energie Cottbus	2	(0)
- * Club domestic league appearances and goals as of 15 May 2022

Till Brinkmann (born 1 November 1995) is a German professional footballer who plays as a goalkeeper.
