= Christian Bickel =

German footballer

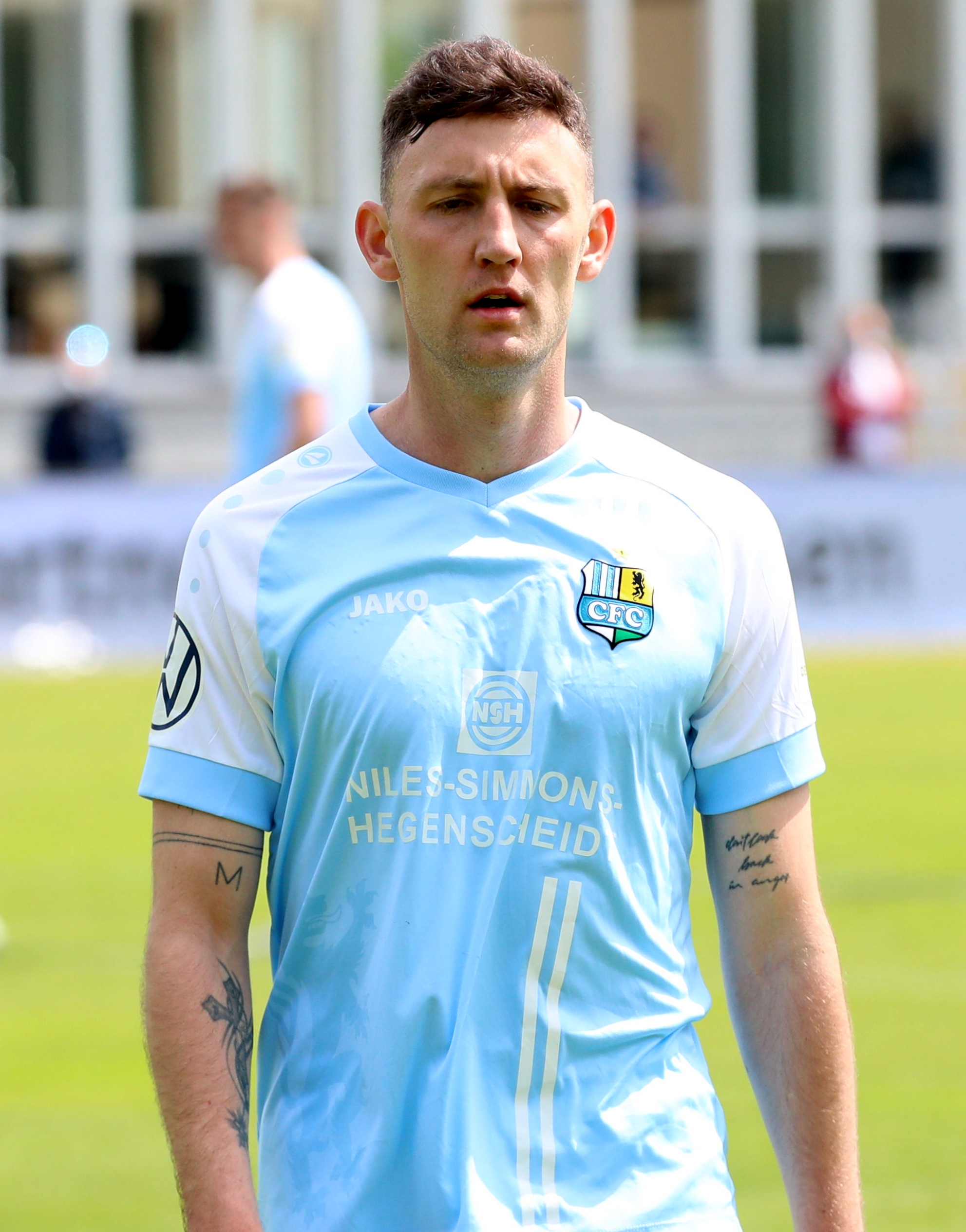
- Bickel in 2021

Personal information
- Date of birth: 27 January 1991 (age 35)
- Place of birth: Bad Langensalza, Germany
- Height: 1.79 m (5 ft 10 in)
- Position: Midfielder

Team information
- Current team: BW 91 Bad Frankenhausen

Youth career
- Fortuna Gräfentonna
- FSV Wacker 03 Gotha
- –2009: Rot-Weiß Erfurt
- 2009–2010: SC Freiburg

Senior career*
Years	Team	Apps	(Gls)
2010–2013	SC Freiburg II	58	(24)
2011–2013	SC Freiburg	0	(0)
2012	→ Jahn Regensburg (loan)	3	(0)
2013–2014	Energie Cottbus	31	(1)
2013	Energie Cottbus II	1	(1)
2014–2015	Hansa Rostock	44	(12)
2015–2018	SC Paderborn	36	(2)
2017–2018	→ VfL Osnabrück (loan)	7	(0)
2018–2020	FSV Zwickau	22	(0)
2020–2022	Chemnitzer FC	33	(8)
2022–	BW 91 Bad Frankenhausen		

International career
2010	Germany U20	3	(0)
- * Club domestic league appearances and goals as of 15 May 2022

Christian Bickel (born 27 January 1991) is a German professional footballer who plays for amateur club BW 91 Bad Frankenhausen as a midfielder.

Bickel was born in Bad Langensalza. Before joining Hansa Rostock, he played for SC Freiburg.

== Career ==
=== Early career ===
After playing youth football for Rot-Weiß Erfurt, Bickel joined SC Freiburg aged 18, having been scouted at a competition. He became a regular player for their reserve team in the 2010–11 season, scoring 19 goals in 32 games in the Regionalliga Süd and was awarded a professional contract at the end of the season. He also made two appearances for the Germany under-20 team during the 2010–11 season. On 28 September 2011, having scored 4 goals in 7 games for the reserve team so far that season, Bickel signed a new contract with Freiburg, valid until 2014. On 1 February 2012, Bickel joined 3. Liga club SSV Jahn Regensburg on loan until the end of the season. He made three appearances for the club as they were promoted to the 2. Bundesliga.

=== Energie Cottbus ===
On 2 January 2013, he joined Energie Cottbus of the 2. Bundesliga on a free transfer, signing a contract until summer 2015. He had previously had a trial at the club in October the previous year.

Bickel made 21 league appearances across the 2013–14 season, as Cottbus finished bottom of the 2. Bundesliga and were relegated to the 3. Liga. Bickel was later criticised by the club for his performances across the 2013–14 season and fined by the club for comments about the club while under contract.

=== Hansa Rostock ===
On 21 May 2014, Bickel returned to the 3. Liga, signing for Hansa Rostock on a three-year contract.

Bickel was given the 3. Liga Player of the Month award for March 2015, having won 52.6% of votes.

=== SC Paderborn ===
On 20 August 2015, Bickel signed for 2. Bundesliga club SC Paderborn on a two-year contract with the option for a further year. Over the course of the season, he played in only 10 of Paderborn's league matches, having suffered a torn ligament in his knee in September and a torn muscle in February.

At the end of the 2015–16 season, he signed a new contract with the club, valid until 2019.

In June 2017, Bickel joined VfL Osnabrück on a season-long loan. The following month, Bickel tore his anterior cruciate ligament in a 4–0 defeat to Wehen Wiesbaden.

On 16 May 2018, it was announced that Bickel's Paderborn contract had been terminated by mutual consent.

=== FSV Zwickau ===
In summer 2018, Bickel joined FSV Zwickau on a contract until June 2021.

Having failed to play for the club thus far during the 2019–20 season, Bickel attempted to find a loan move elsewhere during the winter transfer window, but no transfer materialised for him. He made 2 substitute appearances for the club later in the season.

=== Chemnitzer FC ===
In July 2020, Bickel's contract with Zwickau was terminated and he signed for Regionalliga Nordost club Chemnitzer FC. He scored on his debut for the club in a 3–0 Saxony Cup semi-final win over Inter Leipzig in August 2020, and he also played in the 2–1 victory over FC Eilenburg in the final later that month, despite having already been eliminated from the competition at the quarter-final stage with FSV Zwickau. Bickel was awarded the ARD Sportschau's Goal of the Month award for October 2020, for a strike from 47 meters against Berliner AK 07 in the Regionalliga Nordost. The league season was suspended in November 2020 however due to the COVID-19 pandemic, with Bickel having scored 6 goals in 11 games, and in March 2020 it was announced that the season would not be resumed. In February 2021, his contract was extended to include the 2021–22 season. He suffered from COVID-19 during April 2021.

Bickel was diagnosed with pericarditis in June 2021, but was able to return to first-team training in August.

In May 2022, it was announced that Bickel's contract would be terminated at the end of the season at his request, due to his persistent injury problems. In his final match for Chemnitz, the Saxony Cup final against Chemie Leipzig, Bickel scored the winning goal in Chemnitz's 2–1 victory with a strike from 20 yards.

In summer 2022, Bickel joined amateur side BW 91 Bad Frankenhausen. As of March 2025, he was both a player and a youth coach at the club.

== Style of play ==
He plays largely as a central midfielder but can also play as a winger.

== Personal life ==
Bickel was married to his wife Veronika in June 2014. As of August 2020, they have two children.
