= Manfred Osei Kwadwo =

Ghanaian footballer

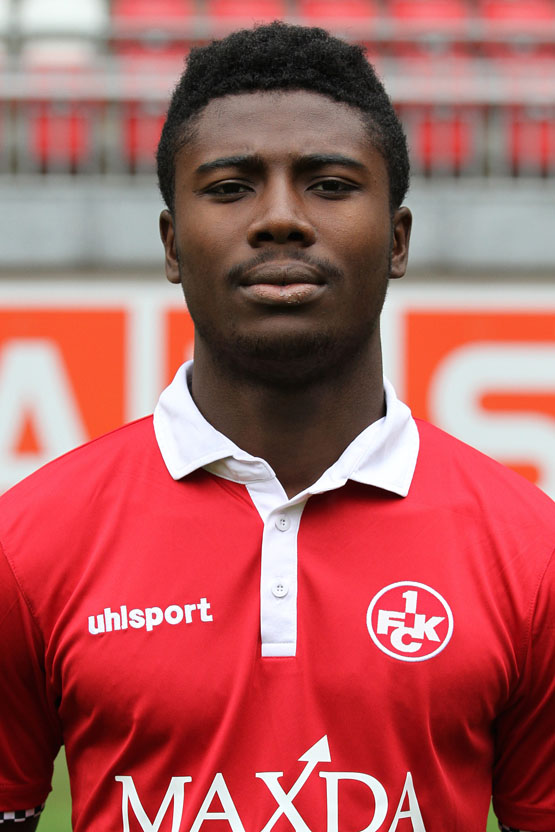
- Osei Kwadwo in 2015

Personal information
- Date of birth: 30 May 1995 (age 31)
- Place of birth: Kumasi, Ghana
- Height: 1.71 m (5 ft 7 in)
- Positions: Midfielder; forward

Team information
- Current team: VfR Mannheim
- Number: 10

Youth career
- 2011–2014: 1. FC Kaiserslautern

Senior career*
Years	Team	Apps	(Gls)
2014–2018	1. FC Kaiserslautern II	31	(8)
2014–2018	1. FC Kaiserslautern	22	(0)
2016–2017	→ Sonnenhof Großaspach (loan)	27	(3)
2018–2020	1. FC Magdeburg	28	(3)
2020–2021	Waldhof Mannheim	8	(0)
2021–2023	Preußen Münster	10	(0)
2023	Preußen Münster II	1	(1)
2023–	VfR Mannheim	3	(1)
- * Club domestic league appearances and goals as of 1 June 2024

Manfred Osei Kwadwo (born 30 May 1995) is a Ghanaian professional footballer who plays as a midfielder for German club VfR Mannheim.

== Career ==
In August 2017, Osei Kwadwo agreed to a contract extension with 1. FC Kaiserslautern until 2020.

He joined SV Waldhof Mannheim in November 2020.
