= Marc Vucinovic =

German former professional footballer (born 1988)

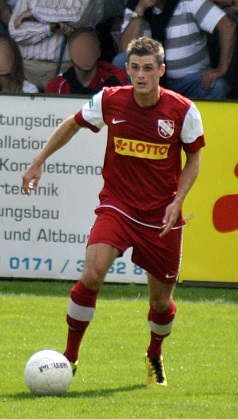
- Vucinovic in the 2011–12 season

Personal information
- Date of birth: 19 September 1988 (age 38)
- Place of birth: Hanover, West Germany
- Height: 1.79 m (5 ft 10 in)
- Position: Midfielder

Youth career
- SV Germania Grasdorf
- –2007: Hannover 96

Senior career*
Years	Team	Apps	(Gls)
2007–2008	SV Bavenstedt	45	(19)
2009–2010	Eintracht Braunschweig	4	(0)
2009–2011	Eintracht Braunschweig II	18	(3)
2011	TuSpo Schliekum		
2011–2013	TSV Havelse	60	(26)
2013–2018	SC Paderborn	59	(4)
2018	SC Paderborn II	1	(0)
- * Club domestic league appearances and goals

Marc Vucinovic (born 19 September 1988) is a German former professional footballer who played as a midfielder.

== Career ==
Vucinovic started his senior career at the Niedersachsenliga side SV Bavenstedt, where he was a prolific goalscorer. He was then signed by Eintracht Braunschweig in 2008 and made his professional debut on 14 March 2009, in a 3. Liga game against 1. FC Union Berlin. However, due to injury problems Vucinovic never became a regular. He asked to be released from his contract in 2011 and went back into semi-professional football.

Vucinovic returned to the professional leagues in 2013, when his good performances at Havelse landed him a two-year-contract with 2. Bundesliga side SC Paderborn 07. On 24 August 2014, he made his top-flight debut for Paderborn, in a Bundesliga match against 1. FSV Mainz 05.

He retired after being released by Paderborn in summer 2018, due to a knee injury.

== Personal life ==
In winter 2018 Vucinovic moved to Sarstedt als a player-coach.
