= 2015–16 FC St. Pauli season =

FC St. Pauli
2015–16 season
- President: Oke Göttlich
- Manager: Ewald Lienen
- Stadium: Millerntor-Stadion
- 2. Bundesliga: 4th
- DFB-Pokal: Round 1
- Top goalscorer: League: Lennart Thy (8); All: Lennart Thy, Marc Rzatkowski (8)
Home colours	Away colours	Third colours

The 2015–16 FC St. Pauli season is the club's 105th season of existence, and their fifth consecutive season in the 2. Bundesliga, the second tier of German football.

== Background ==
After narrowly avoiding relegation during the 2014–15 season, FC. St Pauli started to strengthen the squad in the summer to prevent another relegation battle.

== Transfers ==
=== In ===
Position	Name	From	Fee	Reference
MF	(Germany) Jeremy Dudziak	(Germany) Borussia Dortmund	€ 500K	
DF	(Germany) Lasse Sobiech	(Germany) Hamburger SV	free	
FW	(Haiti) Fafà Picault	(Czech Republic) Sparta Prague	free	
FW	(Japan) Ryo Miyaichi	(England) Arsenal	free	
DF	(Ghana) Davidson Eden	(Austria) FC Wacker Innsbruck	free	
DF	(Germany) Marc Hornschuh	(Germany) FSV Frankfurt	free	
FW	(Poland) Waldemar Sobota	(Belgium) Club Brugge	loan	

=== Out ===
Position	Name	From	Fee
DF	(Germany) Marcel Halstenberg	(Germany) RasenBallsport Leipzig	€3.5mln
GK	(Germany) Philipp Tschauner	(Germany) Hannover 96	free
MF	(Germany) Tom Trybull	(Germany) Greuther Fürth	free
MF	(Germany) Dennis Daube	(Germany) Union Berlin	free
MF	(Germany) Michael Görlitz	(Germany) Arminia Bielefeld	free
FW	(Germany) Christopher Nöthe	(Germany) Arminia Bielefeld	free
MF	(Panama) Armando Cooper	(Panama) Árabe Unido	free
DF	(Germany) Sebastian Schachten	(Switzerland) FC Luzern	free
DF	(Germany) Markus Thorandt	no club	free
MF	(Germany) Florian Kringe	end of career	
FW	(Croatia) Ante Budimir	(Italy) F.C. Crotone	loan
MF	(Germany) Julian Koch	(Germany) FSV Mainz	end of loan

== Competitions ==
=== Preseason ===
26 June 2015 1	Buxtehuder SV	1–9	FC St. Pauli	Buxtehude
18:30	Ramazanoglu (17)	Report	Budimir (19, 31), Miyaichi (27), Halstenberg (29), Thy (33, 42), Stenzel (66), Verhoek (72, 73)	Stadium: Jahnstadion; Attendance: 2,032

28 June 2015 2	MTV Barum	0–3	FC St. Pauli	Barum
16:00		Report	Thy (12), Rzatkowski (31), Braun (83 o.g.)	Stadium: Waldstadion; Attendance: 1,400

30 June 2015 3	Hetlinger MTV	0–13	FC St. Pauli	Hetlingen
18:30		Report	Stenzel (21), Buchtmann (23, 39), Empen (38), Maier (43), Sobota (49, 71), Halstenberg (56), Litka (68), Rosin (75, 90), Rzatkowski (83), Choi (88)	Stadium: Deichstadion; Attendance: 1,000

3 July 2015 4	ETSV Weiche Flensburg	0–4	FC St. Pauli	Flensburg
19:00		Report	Buballa (2), Budimir (47), Sobota (76), Stenzel (89)	Stadium: Manfred-Werner-Stadion; Attendance: 1,589

5 July 2015 5	BK Frem Kopenhagen	2–3	FC St. Pauli	Valby
15:00	Nielsen (16), Andersson (66)	Report	Maier (31), Ziereis (32), Thy (36)	Stadium: Valby Idrætspark; Attendance: 5,510

9 July 2015 6	Austria Lustenau	0–1	FC St. Pauli	Lustenau
18:30		Report	Halstenberg (83)	Stadium: Reichshofstadion; Attendance: 2,000

11 July 2015 7	FC Winterthur	0–1	FC St. Pauli	Winterthur
18:30		Report	Choi (79)	Stadium: Stadion Schützenwiese; Attendance: 4,800

14 July 2015 8	SC Freiburg	0–0	FC St. Pauli	Friedrichshafen
18:30		Report		Stadium: Zeppelinstadion

18 July 2015 9	FC St. Pauli	4–2	Rayo Vallecano	Hamburg
15:30	Maier (7), Sobiech (28), Gonther (36), Thy (49)	Report	Uche (51), Moreno (71)	Stadium: Millerntor-Stadion; Attendance: 9,839

19 July 2015 10	SV Todesfelde	1–9	FC St. Pauli	Todesfelde
15:00	Unknown (44)	Report	Sobota (11, 25), Verhoek (20, 63, 90), Ziereis (41), Budimir (49, 56, 67)	Stadium: A-Platz Todesfelde

=== 2. Bundesliga ===
==== Table ====
Pos	Team	Pld	W	D	L	GF	GA	GD	Pts	Promotion, qualification or relegation
2	RB Leipzig (P)	34	20	7	7	54	32	+22	67	Promotion to Bundesliga
3	1. FC Nürnberg	34	19	8	7	68	41	+27	65	Qualification for promotion play-offs
4	FC St. Pauli	34	15	8	11	45	39	+6	53	
5	VfL Bochum	34	13	12	9	56	40	+16	51	
6	Union Berlin	34	13	10	11	56	50	+6	49	

Source: DFB
Rules for classification: 1) Points; 2) Goal difference; 3) Goals scored
(P) Promoted

==== Match results ====
25 July 2015 1	FC St. Pauli	0–0	Arminia Bielefeld	Hamburg
15:30		Report		Stadium: Millerntor-Stadion; Attendance: 29,546; Referee: Wolfgang Stark

2 August 2015 2	Karlsruher SC	1–2	FC St. Pauli	Karlsruhe
15:30	Gordon (29)	Report	Sobiech (10), Halstenberg (40)	Stadium: Wildparkstadion; Attendance: 21,899; Referee: Benjamin Brand

16 August 2015 3	FC St. Pauli	3–2	SpVgg Greuther Fürth	Hamburg
13:30	Rzatkowski (20, 74), Halstenberg (34)	Report	Freis (42), Zulj (79)	Stadium: Millerntor-Stadion; Attendance: 28,421; Referee: Frank Willenborg

23 August 2015 4	RasenBallsport Leipzig	0–1	FC St. Pauli	Leipzig
13:30		Report	Thy (44)	Stadium: Red Bull Arena; Attendance: 41,795; Referee: Bastian Dankert

30 August 2015 5	FSV Frankfurt	1–0	FC St. Pauli	Frankfurt
13:30	Halimi (46)	Report		Stadium: Frankfurter Volksbank Stadion; Attendance: 10,217; Referee: Sören Storks

14 September 2015 6	FC St. Pauli	2–0	MSV Duisburg	Hamburg
20:15	Sobiech (70), Maier (87)	Report		Stadium: Millerntor-Stadion; Attendance: 29,546; Referee: René Rohde

20 September 2015 7	Eintracht Braunschweig	0–0	FC St. Pauli	Braunschweig
13:30		Report		Stadium: Eintracht-Stadion; Attendance: 23,325; Referee: Benjamin Brand

23 September 2015 8	FC St. Pauli	1–0	1. FC Heidenheim	Hamburg
17:30	Maier (34)	Report		Stadium: Millerntor-Stadion; Attendance: 29,154; Referee: Christian Dietz

26 September 2015 9	SC Paderborn 07	0–0	FC St. Pauli	Paderborn
13:00		Report		Stadium: Benteler Arena; Attendance: 13,102; Referee: Harm Osmers

3 October 2015 10	FC St. Pauli	1–3	SV Sandhausen	Hamburg
13:00	Choi (75)	Report	Kosecki (5), Jovanovic (8), Bouhaddouz (77)	Stadium: Millerntor-Stadion; Attendance: 29,546; Referee: Benjamin Cortus

17 October 2015 11	1.FC Union Berlin	3–3	FC St. Pauli	Berlin
13:00	Zejnullahu (42), Thiel (45), Kessel (90+3)	Report	Sobota (22), Hornschuh (54), Dudziak (72)	Stadium: Alte Försterei; Attendance: 22,012; Referee: Robert Schröder

25 October 2015 12	FC St. Pauli	1–0	SC Freiburg	Hamburg
13:30	Rzatkowski (90+1)	Report		Stadium: Millerntor-Stadion; Attendance: 29,546; Referee: Peter Sippel

30 October 2015 13	VfL Bochum	1–1	FC St. Pauli	Bochum
18:30	Terodde (12)	Report	Kalla (10)	Stadium: rewirpowerSTADION; Attendance: 25,914; Referee: Felix Zwayer

9 November 2015 14	FC St. Pauli	4–0	Fortuna Düsseldorf	Hamburg
20:15	Thy (13, 22, 70, 86)	Report		Stadium: Millerntor-Stadion; Attendance: 29,017; Referee: Florian Meyer

21 November 2015 15	TSV 1860 München	2–0	FC St. Pauli	Munich
13:00	Liendl (53), Okotie (56)	Report		Stadium: Allianz Arena; Attendance: 30,100; Referee: Dr. Jochen Drees

29 November 2015 16	FC St. Pauli	0–4	1.FC Nürnberg	Hamburg
13:30		Report	Füllkrug (19, 43), Leibold (53), Erras (88)	Stadium: Millerntor-Stadion; Attendance: 29,546; Referee: Sören Storcks

6 December 2015 17	1.FC Kaiserslautern	1–2	FC St. Pauli	Kaiserslautern
13:30	Halfar (69)	Report	Thy (3, 56)	Stadium: Fritz-Walter-Stadion; Attendance: 29,352; Referee: Sascha Stegemann

14 December 2015 18	Arminia Bielefeld	0–0	FC St. Pauli	Bielefeld
20:15		Report		Stadium: SchücoArena; Attendance: 19,012; Referee: Benjamin Brand

18 December 2015 19	FC St. Pauli	1–2	Karlsruher SC	Hamburg
18:30	Nehrig (24)	Report	Torres (37), Diamantakos (71)	Stadium: Millerntor-Stadion; Attendance: 29,546; Referee: Michael Weiner

7 February 2016 20	SpVgg Greuther Fürth	0–2	FC St. Pauli	Fürth
13:30		Report	Hornschuh (34), Sobota (62)	Stadium: Stadion am Laubenweg; Attendance: 12,055; Referee: Manuel Gräfe

12 February 2016 21	FC St. Pauli	1–0	RasenBallsport Leipzig	Hamburg
18:30	Rzatkowski (8)	Report		Stadium: Millerntor-Stadion; Attendance: 29,546; Referee: Tobias Welz

19 February 2016 22	FC St. Pauli	1–3	FSV Frankfurt	Hamburg
18:30	Rzatkowski (10)	Report	Yann (11), Schahin (32), Sobiech (o.g.) (53)	Stadium: Millerntor-Stadion; Attendance: 29,342; Referee: Aarne Arnink

28 February 2016 23	MSV Duisburg	0–2	FC St. Pauli	Duisburg
13:30		Report	Rzatkowski (64), Verhoek (90+4)	Stadium: Schauinsland-Reisen-Arena; Attendance: 20,790; Referee: Frank Willenborg

3 March 2016 24	FC St. Pauli	1–0	Eintracht Braunschweig	Hamburg
20:15	Verhoek (82)	Report		Stadium: Millerntor-Stadion; Attendance: 29,271; Referee: Benjamin Brand

6 March 2016 25	1. FC Heidenheim	2–0	FC St. Pauli	Heidenheim
13:30	Thomalla (71), Finne (81)	Report		Stadium: Voith-Arena; Attendance: 14,000; Referee: Robert Hartmann

11 March 2016 26	FC St. Pauli	3–4	SC Paderborn 07	Hamburg
18:30	Sobiech (pen) (51), Sobota (84), Picault (90+3)	Report	Helenius 7, 59, Hartherz (24), Bertels (81)	Stadium: Millerntor-Stadion; Attendance: 28,815; Referee: Wolfgang Stark

19 March 2016 27	SV Sandhausen	0–2	FC St. Pauli	Sandhausen
13:00		Report	Thy (8), Rzatkowski (40)	Stadium: Hardtwaldstadion; Attendance: 7,043; Referee: Thorsten Schriever

1 April 2016 28	FC St. Pauli	0–0	1.FC Union Berlin	Hamburg
18:30		Report		Stadium: Millerntor-Stadion; Attendance: 29,546; Referee: Bibiana Steinhaus

10 April 2016 29	SC Freiburg	4–3	FC St. Pauli	Freiburg
13:30	Kempf (3, 85), Grifo (36), Philipp (60)	Report	Nehrig (55), Alushi (75), Sobiech (pen) (90)	Stadium: Schwarzwald-Stadion; Attendance: 24,000; Referee: Guido Winkmann

16 April 2016 30	FC St. Pauli	2–0	VfL Bochum	Hamburg
13:00	Picault (52, 65)	Report		Stadium: Millerntor-Stadion; Attendance: 29,546; Referee: Florian Meyer

22 April 2016 31	Fortuna Düsseldorf	1–1	FC St. Pauli	Düsseldorf
18:30	Demirbay (5)	Report	Picault (71)	Stadium: ESPRIT arena Attendance: 30,820; Referee: Robert Schröder

29 April 2016 32	FC St. Pauli	0–2	TSV 1860 München	Hamburg
18:30		Report	Claasen (8), Aycicek (88)	Stadium: Millerntor-Stadion; Attendance: 29,546; Referee: Knut Kircher

8 May 2016 33	1.FC Nürnberg	1–0	FC St. Pauli	Nuremberg
15:30	Füllkrug (22)	Report		Stadium: Grundig-Stadion; Attendance: 50,000; Referee: Marco Fritz

15 May 2016 34	FC St. Pauli	5–2	1.FC Kaiserslautern	Hamburg
15:30	Miyaichi (5, 57), Thy (22), Maier (72), Buchtmann (79)	Report	Görtler (4), Jenssen (76)	Stadium: Millerntor-Stadion; Attendance: 29,546; Referee: Wolfgang Stark

=== DFB-Pokal ===
10 August 2015 First Round	FC St. Pauli	1–4	Borussia Mönchengladbach	Hamburg
20:30	Rzatkowski (34)	Report	Stindl (55, 67), Traoré (56), Hazard (86)	Stadium: Millerntor-Stadion; Attendance: 28,175; Referee: Florian Meyer

== Statistics ==
=== Squad and statistics ===
As of 4 June 2016<

No.	Pos	Nat	Player	Total		2. Bundesliga		DFB-Pokal	
No.	Pos	Nat	Player	Apps	Goals	Apps	Goals	Apps	Goals
1	GK	(Germany) GER	Philipp Heerwagen	0	0	0	0	0	0
30	GK	(Germany) GER	Robin Himmelmann	35	0	34	0	1	0
33	GK	(Germany) GER	Sven Brodersen	0	0	0	0	0	0
3	DF	(Germany) GER	Lasse Sobiech	32	4	32	4	0	0
4	DF	(Germany) GER	Philipp Ziereis	31	0	30	0	1	0
5	DF	(Switzerland) SUI	Joël Keller	5	0	5	0	0	0
15	DF	(Germany) GER	Daniel Buballa	35	0	34	0	1	0
16	DF	(Germany) GER	Marc Hornschuh	27	2	27	2	0	0
17	DF	(Ghana) GHA	Davidson Eden	2	0	2	0	0	0
22	DF	(Germany) GER	Yannick Deichmann	4	0	4	0	0	0
26	DF	(Germany) GER	Sören Gonther	13	0	12	0	1	0
27	DF	(Germany) GER	Jan-Philipp Kalla	15	1	15	1	0	0
34	DF	(Germany) GER	Andrej Startsev	0	0	0	0	0	0
7	MF	(Germany) GER	Bernd Nehrig	23	2	22	2	1	0
8	MF	(Germany) GER	Jeremy Dudziak	21	1	21	1	0	0
10	MF	(Germany) GER	Christopher Buchtmann	30	1	30	1	0	0
11	MF	(Germany) GER	Marc Rzatkowski	29	8	28	7	1	1
13	MF	(Japan) JPN	Ryo Miyaichi	5	2	5	2	0	0
19	MF	(Kosovo) KOS	Enis Alushi	27	1	26	1	1	0
25	MF	(Germany) GER	Dennis Rosin	0	0	0	0	0	0
28	MF	(Poland) POL	Waldemar Sobota	32	3	31	3	1	0
29	MF	(Germany) GER	Sebastian Maier	28	3	27	3	1	0
31	MF	(Germany) GER	Maurice Litka	1	0	0	0	1	0
36	MF	(Turkey) TUR	Okan Adil Kurt	0	0	0	0	0	0
37	MF	(South Korea) KOR	Kyoung-Rok Choi	22	1	21	1	1	0
9	FW	(Haiti) HAI	Fafà Picault	16	4	16	4	0	0
12	FW	(Netherlands) NED	John Verhoek	17	2	16	2	1	0
18	FW	(Germany) GER	Lennart Thy	31	8	30	8	1	0
24	FW	(Germany) GER	Nico Empen	0	0	0	0	0	0
