= 2013–14 FC St. Pauli season =

FC St. Pauli
2013–14 season
- Chairman: Stefan Orth
- Manager: Michael Frontzeck
- Stadium: Millerntor-Stadion, Hamburg, Germany
- DFB-Pokal: Eliminated in 2nd Round
Home colours	Away colours	Third colours

The 2013–14 FC St. Pauli season was the 103rd season in the club's football history. In 2013–14, the club played in the 2. Bundesliga, the second tier of German football. It was the club's third consecutive season in the league, having played at this level since 2011–12, after it was relegated from the Bundesliga in 2012.

The club also took part in the 2013–14 edition of the DFB-Pokal, where it reached the second round and faced Bundesliga side VfB Stuttgart.

== Matches ==
=== Legend ===
Win Draw Loss Postponed

=== DFB-Pokal ===
4 August 2013 1	Preußen Münster	1–0	FC St. Pauli	Münster
18:30 CEST (UTC+02:00)	Taylor 31'; Kühne (yellow card) 56'; Halet (yellow card) 90'	Report (in German)	Buchtmann (yellow card) 17'; Thy (yellow card) 51'; Kalla (yellow card) 82'; Boll (yellow card) 90'	Stadium: Preußenstadion; Attendance: 15,000; Referee: Robert Kampka (Mainz)

=== 2. Bundesliga ===
19 July 2013 1	FC St. Pauli	1–0	1860 Munich	Hamburg
20:30 CEST (UTC+02:00)	Tschauner (yellow card) 13'; Gonther (yellow card) 20'; Nöthe (yellow card) 25'; Rzatkowski (yellow card) 74'; Thy 80'; Buchtmann (yellow card) 90'	Report (in German)	Friend (yellow card) 13'; Volz (yellow card) 40'	Stadium: Millerntor-Stadion; Attendance: 27,818; Referee: Thorsten Kinhöfer (Herne)

27 July 2013 2	Karlsruher SC	0–0	FC St. Pauli	Karlsruhe
15:30 CEST (UTC+02:00)		Report (in German)	Buchtmann (yellow card) 24'; Gonther (yellow card) 58'; Thorandt (yellow card) 90'	Stadium: Wildparkstadion; Attendance: 17,667; Referee: Guido Winkmann (Kerken)

11 August 2013 3	FC St. Pauli	0–1	Arminia Bielefeld	Hamburg
13:30 CEST (UTC+02:00)	Kringe (yellow card) 17'; Thorandt (yellow card) 23'; Boll (yellow card) 41'; Nehrig (yellow card) 64'; Buchtmann (yellow card) 74'	Report (in German)	Jerat (yellow card) 6'; Hübener 67' (pen.), (yellow card) 69'	Stadium: Millerntor-Stadion; Attendance: 28,558; Referee: Robert Hartmann (Wangen)

16 August 2013 4	VfL Bochum	2–2	FC St. Pauli	Bochum
20:30 CEST (UTC+02:00)	Butscher 18'; Sukuta-Pasu (yellow card) 45'; Freier (yellow card) 61'; Fabian (yellow card) 63'; Jungwirth 69'; Eyjólfsson (yellow card) 79'	Report (in German)	Verhoek 23', 35'; Nehrig (yellow card) 37'; Thy (yellow card) 38'; Bartels (yellow card) 39'; Nöthe (yellow card) 84'; Verhoek (yellow card) 87'	Stadium: rewirpowerSTADION; Attendance: 23,028; Referee: Marco Fritz (Korb)

26 August 2013 5	FC St. Pauli	2–1	Dynamo Dresden	Hamburg
20:15 CEST (UTC+02:00)	Kringe 73'; Maier 88'	Report (in German)	Fiel (yellow card) 21'; Aoudia 71'; Koch (yellow card) 78'	Stadium: Millerntor-Stadion; Attendance: 28,587; Referee: Manuel Gräfe (Berlin)

31 August 2013 6	Union Berlin	3–2	FC St. Pauli	Berlin
13:00 CEST (UTC+02:00)	Mattuschka 36' (pen.); Kreilach (yellow card) 47'; Nemec 59'; Terodde 86'	Report (in German)	Verhoek 1'; Bartels 6'; Thorandt (yellow card) 36'; Boll (yellow card) 43'	Stadium: Stadion An der Alten Försterei; Attendance: 21,717; Referee: Felix Brych (Munich)

14 September 2013 7	FC St. Pauli	2–1	FSV Frankfurt	Hamburg
13:00 CEST (UTC+02:00)	Verhoek 3'; Rzatkowski 58', (yellow card) 76'; Tschauner (yellow card) 63'	Report (in German)	Halstenberg 63' (o.g.); Teixeira (yellow card) 83' (yellow-red card) 89'; Oumari (yellow card) 90'	Stadium: Millerntor-Stadion; Attendance: 27,863; Referee: Robert Kampka (Mainz)

23 September 2013 8	FC St. Pauli	1–1	Fortuna Düsseldorf	Hamburg
20:15 CEST (UTC+02:00)	Nehrig (yellow card) 45'; Buchtmann (yellow card) 70'; Thorandt (red card) 81'; Kringe 82'	Report (in German)	Bodzek (yellow card) 4'; Bancé 47'	Stadium: Millerntor-Stadion; Attendance: 29,063; Referee: Bastian Dankert (Rostock)

29 September 2013 9	FC Ingolstadt	1–2	FC St. Pauli	Ingolstadt
13:30 CEST (UTC+02:00)	Cohen (yellow card) 2'; Da Costa (yellow card) 43'; Matip 80'	Report (in German)	Bartels 45'; Kringe 86' (pen.); Buchtmann (yellow card) 88'	Stadium: Audi Sportpark; Attendance: 7,688; Referee: Robert Kempter (Sauldorf)

4 October 2013 10	FC St. Pauli	1–2	SC Paderborn	Hamburg
18:30 CEST (UTC+02:00)	Kalla (yellow card) 45'; Gonther (yellow card) 65'; Nöthe 66', (yellow card) 67'	Report (in German)	Meha (yellow card) 39'; Sağlık 49'; Brückner (yellow card) 77'; Wurtz 78'; Strohdiek (yellow card) 82'	Stadium: Millerntor-Stadion; Attendance: 28,022; Referee: Martin Petersen (Stuttgart)

20 October 2013 11	SpVgg Greuther Fürth	2–4	FC St. Pauli	Fürth
13:30 CEST (UTC+02:00)	Fürstner 24', (red card) 90'; Azemi (yellow card) 69'; Trinks 77'	Report (in German)	Maier 12', (yellow card) 43'; Schindler 50' (58), (yellow card) 67'; Thorandt (yellow card) 80'; Halstenberg (yellow card) 86'; Buchtmann (yellow card) 90'; Bartels 90'	Stadium: Trolli Arena; Attendance: 14,110; Referee: Knut Kircher (Rottenburg)

25 October 2013 12	FC St. Pauli	0–0	SV Sandhausen	Hamburg
18:30 CEST (UTC+02:00)	Bartels (yellow card) 23'	Report (in German)	Kulovits (yellow card) 7'; Ulm (yellow card) 12'; Schauerte (yellow card) 14'	Stadium: Millerntor-Stadion; Attendance: 27,901; Referee: Benjamin Cortus (Röthenbach an der Pegnitz)

2 November 2013 13	1. FC Kaiserslautern	4–1	FC St. Pauli	Kaiserslautern
13:00 CET (UTC+01:00)	Zoller 6', 49'; Dick (yellow card) 29'; Gonther 65' (o.g.); Karl 90'	Report (in German)	Kalla 31'	Stadium: Fritz-Walter-Stadion; Attendance: 35,330; Referee: Robert Hartmann (Wangen)

11 November 2013 14	FC St. Pauli	3–0	Energie Cottbus	Hamburg
20:15 CET (UTC+01:00)	Buchtmann (yellow card) 27'; Bartels 35'; Schachten 70'; Thorandt 73'	Report (in German)	Stiepermann (yellow card) 43'; Banović (yellow card) 55'; Schulze (yellow card) 83'	Stadium: Millerntor-Stadion; Attendance: 27,441; Referee: Thorsten Kinhöfer (Herne)

24 November 2013 15	VfR Aalen	0–1	FC St. Pauli	Aalen
13:30 CET (UTC+01:00)	Traut (yellow card) 28'	Report (in German)	Nöthe 29', (yellow card) 39'; Buchtmann (yellow card) 67'; Gonther (yellow card) 69'; Halstenberg (yellow card) 82'; Bartels (yellow card) 89'	Stadium: Scholz-Arena; Attendance: 10,480; Referee: Felix Zwayer (Berlin)

29 November 2013 16	FC St. Pauli	0–3	1. FC Köln	Hamburg
18:30 CET (UTC+01:00)	Schachten (yellow card) 36'; Gonther (yellow card) 39' (yellow-red card) 59'; Kalla (yellow card) 77'	Report (in German)	Wimmer 6'; Helmes 28'; Lehmann (yellow card) 68'; Gerhardt 79'; Peszko (yellow card) 84'	Stadium: Millerntor-Stadion; Attendance: 29,063; Referee: Markus Schmidt (Stuttgart)

6 December 2013 17	Erzgebirge Aue	0–2	FC St. Pauli	Aue
18:30 CET (UTC+01:00)	Männel (yellow card) 50'; Koçer (yellow card) 62'; Okoronkwo (yellow card) 80'	Report (in German)	Bartels 8'; Gregoritsch 25'	Stadium: Sparkassen-Erzgebirgsstadion; Attendance: 8,700; Referee: Wolfgang Stark (Ergolding)

16 December 2013 18	1860 Munich	0–2	FC St. Pauli	Munich
20:15 CET (UTC+01:00)	Schindler (yellow card) 4'; Stahl (yellow card) 86'	Report (in German)	Kalla (yellow card) 27'; Nöthe 43'; Bartels 81'	Stadium: Allianz Arena; Attendance: 23,700; Referee: Bastian Dankert (Rostock)

20 December 2013 19	FC St. Pauli	0–2	Karlsruher SC	Hamburg
18:30 CET (UTC+01:00)	Schachten (yellow card) 22'; Halstenberg (yellow card) 70'; Buchtmann (yellow card) 81'; Verhoek (yellow card) 85'	Report (in German)	Kempe (yellow card) 6'; Peitz (yellow card) 53'; Gordon (yellow card) 58'; Mitsanski 63'; Nazarov (yellow card) 79'; Torres 84'; Schwertfeger (yellow card) 88'	Stadium: Millerntor-Stadion; Attendance: 29,063; Referee: Felix Brych (München)

9 February 2014 20	Arminia Bielefeld	2–2	FC St. Pauli	Bielefeld
13:30 CET (UTC+01:00)	Przybylko 69', 90'	Report (in German)	Rzatkowski (yellow card) 3'; Buchtmann (yellow card) 17'; Thy 30'; Nöthe 61'; Halstenberg 85'	Stadium: Schüco Arena; Attendance: 23,828; Referee: Peter Gagelmann (Bremen)

15 February 2014 21	FC St. Pauli	0–1	VfL Bochum	Hamburg
13:00 CET (UTC+01:00)	Maier (yellow card) 85'	Report (in German)	Eyjólfsson 12'; Latza (yellow card) 18'	Stadium: Millerntor-Stadion; Attendance: 29,063; Referee: Daniel Siebert (Berlin)

23 February 2014 22	Dynamo Dresden	1–2	FC St. Pauli	Dresden
13:30 CET (UTC+01:00)	Schuppan (yellow card) 9'; Hartmann 44' (yellow card) 75'	Report (in German)	Rzatkowski (yellow card) 21'; Kringe 35'; Halstenberg 48'; Gonther (yellow card) 64'; Thy (yellow card) 74'	Stadium: Glücksgas Stadion; Attendance: 29,622; Referee: Tobias Welz (Wiesbaden)

3 March 2014 23	FC St. Pauli	2–1	Union Berlin	Hamburg
20:15 CET (UTC+01:00)	Schachten 61'; Trybull (yellow card) 76'; Nehrig (yellow card) 84'; Bartels 88'	Report (in German)	Kreilach (yellow card) 34'; Terodde 58'; Özbek (yellow card) 67'; Parensen (yellow card) 77'	Stadium: Millerntor-Stadion; Attendance: 29,633; Referee: Robert Kempter (Sauldorf)

9 March 2014 24	FSV Frankfurt	1–0	FC St. Pauli	Frankfurt
13:30 CET (UTC+01:00)	Leckie 9'; Kapllani (yellow card) 77'; Epstein (yellow card) 90'	Report (in German)	Rzatkowski (yellow card) 32'; Trybull (yellow card) 39' (yellow-red card) 84'; Thorandt (yellow card) 87'	Stadium: Frankfurter Volksbank Stadion; Attendance: 11,103; Referee: Frank Willenborg (Osnabrück)

16 March 2014 25	Fortuna Düsseldorf	0–2	FC St. Pauli	Düsseldorf
13:30 CET (UTC+01:00)	Benschop (yellow card) 33'; Bodzek (yellow card) 75'; Soares (yellow card) 89'	Report (in German)	Maier 21'; Gregoritsch (yellow card) 25'; Thy (yellow card) 75', (goal) 90'; Schachten (yellow card) 90'	Stadium: Esprit Arena; Attendance: 41,357; Referee: Peter Sippel (Munich)

22 March 2014 26	FC St. Pauli	0–0	FC Ingolstadt	Hamburg
13:00 CET (UTC+01:00)	Gonther (yellow card) 61'; Mohr (yellow card) 90'	Report (in German)		Stadium: Millerntor-Stadion; Attendance: 28,301; Referee: Bibiana Steinhaus (Hannover)

25 March 2014 27	SC Paderborn	3–0	FC St. Pauli	Paderborn
17:30 CET (UTC+01:00)	Saglik (yellow card) 27', (goal) 41', 69' (pen.); Brückner (yellow card) 30'; Heinloth (yellow card) 62'; Meha 58'	Report (in German)	Gonther (yellow card) 18'; Rzatkowski (yellow card) 21'; Trybull (yellow card) 63'; Buchtmann (yellow card) 85'	Stadium: Benteler Arena; Attendance: 14,411; Referee: Wolfgang Stark (Ergolding)

28 March 2014 28	FC St. Pauli	2–2	SpVgg Greuther Fürth	Hamburg
18:30 CET (UTC+01:00)	Buchtmann (yellow card) 26'; Gonther (yellow card) 49'; Schindler (yellow card) 53'; Schachten 66', (yellow card) 88'; Thorandt 85'	Report (in German)	Đurđić (yellow card) 28'; Šukalo (yellow card) 31'; Gießelmann (yellow card) 40'; Weilandt (yellow card) 54'; Sparv (yellow card) 70'; Hesl (yellow card) 73'; Röcker 75'; Azemi 78'	Stadium: Millerntor-Stadion; Attendance: 28,087; Referee: Daniel Siebert (Berlin)

5 April 2014 29	SV Sandhausen	2–3	FC St. Pauli	Sandhausen
13:00 CEST (UTC+02:00)	Blum 50'; Tüting (yellow card) 56'; Adler 70'	Report (in German)	Kalla (yellow card) 38'; Nöthe (yellow card) 43'; Gonther 55'; Schachten 76'; Rzatkowski 79'	Stadium: Hardtwaldstadion; Attendance: 8,050; Referee: Martin Thomsen (Kleve)

11 April 2014 30	FC St. Pauli	2–3	1. FC Kaiserslautern	Hamburg
18:30 CEST (UTC+02:00)	Verhoek 15'; Schachten (yellow card) 29'; Thorandt (yellow card) 36'; Halstenberg (yellow card) 76'; Kringe (yellow card) 89'	Report (in German)	Sippel (yellow card) 10'; Lakić (yellow card) 14', (goal) 31'; Karl 61'; Orban (yellow card) 67' (yellow-red card) 90'; Idrissou (yellow card) 77'; Matmour (yellow card) 88'; Jenssen 90'	Stadium: Millerntor-Stadion; Attendance: 29,063; Referee: Marco Fritz (Korb)

17 April 2014 31	Energie Cottbus	1–1	FC St. Pauli	Cottbus
18:30 CEST (UTC+02:00)	Michel (yellow card) 65'; Banović 87'	Report (in German)	Buchtmann (yellow card) 43'; Thy 60'; Maier (yellow card) 76'; Nehrig (yellow card) 90'	Stadium: Stadion der Freundschaft; Attendance: 10,000; Referee: Robert Kempter (Sauldorf)

27 April 2014 32	FC St. Pauli	0–3	VfR Aalen	Hamburg
13:30 CEST (UTC+02:00)	Thy (yellow card) 51'; Rzatkowski (yellow card) 56'; Schachten (yellow card) 58'; Buchtmann (yellow card) 80'; Gregoritsch (yellow card) 86'	Report (in German)	Lechleiter 3'; Grech 58' (pen.); Junglas 68'	Stadium: Millerntor-Stadion; Attendance: 27,497; Referee: Christian Bandurski (Oberhausen)

4 May 2014 33	1. FC Köln	4–0	FC St. Pauli	Köln
15:30 CEST (UTC+02:00)	Ujah 13'; Kalla 39' (o.g.); Helmes 43'; Bigalke 61'; Nagasawa (yellow card) 67'	Report (in German)		Stadium: RheinEnergieStadion; Attendance: 50,000; Referee: Günter Perl (Pullach)

11 May 2014 34	FC St. Pauli	2–2	Erzgebirge Aue	Hamburg
15:30 CEST (UTC+02:00)	Nöthe 14'; Maier 38'; Thorandt (yellow card) 51'; Schachten (yellow card) 65'; Gonther (yellow card) 87'	Report (in German)	Koçer 28'; Schlitte (yellow card) 56'; Sylvestr 62'	Stadium: Millerntor-Stadion; Attendance: 27,856; Referee: Christian Fischer (Hemer)
