= 2012–13 FSV Frankfurt season =

FSV Frankfurt
2012–13 season
- Manager: Benno Möhlmann
- Stadium: Frankfurter Volksbank Stadion, Frankfurt, Germany
- 2. Bundesliga: 4th
- DFB-Pokal: 2nd Round
- Top goalscorer: League: Edmond Kapllani (11); All: Edmond Kapllani (11)
- Highest home attendance: 10,470 (vs. 1. FC Kaiserslautern, 24 November 2012), (vs. 1. FC Köln, 3 March 2013)
- Lowest home attendance: 2,612 (vs. SV Sandhausen, 7 December 2012)
- Average home league attendance: 5,511

The 2012–13 FSV Frankfurt season is the 114th season in the club's football history. In 2012–13 the club plays in the 2. Bundesliga, the second tier of German football. It is the clubs fifth consecutive season in this league, having played at this level since 2007–08, having been promoted from the Regionalliga in 2007.

The club also takes part in the 2012–13 edition of the DFB-Pokal, the German Cup, where it reached the second round and will face Bundesliga side VfL Wolfsburg. They lost 2–0 in the second round against, thus ending their participation in the competition.

== Matches ==
=== Legend ===
Win Draw Loss Postponed

=== Friendly matches ===
23 June 2012	Spvgg. 08 Bad Nauheim	0–10	FSV Frankfurt	Bad Nauheim
17:00		Report	Görlitz 7'; Kaffenberger 13'; Heubach 36'; Winkel 63' 65'; Gledson 71'; Leckie 76'; Brown Forbes 80' 85'; Konrad 90'	Stadium: Bad Nauheimer Waldstadion; Attendance: 350

29 June 2012	FV Rußheim	0–14	FSV Frankfurt	Dettenheim
18:30		Report	Nefiz 16', 18', 33', 36'; Kapllani 40', 42'; Pacar 52', 53'; Leckie 60', 74'; Hofmeier 61', 65'; Teixeira 86'; Jung 88'	Attendance: 350

30 June 2012	SSV Heilsberg	0–12	FSV Frankfurt	Bad Vilbel
15:00		Report	Görlitz 3', 24'; Kapllani 12', 39', 45', 80'; Leckie 30'; Schick 68'; Pacar 70', 78', 79', 86'	Attendance: 300

3 July 2012	1. FC Eschborn	0–3	FSV Frankfurt	Eschborn
18:30		Report	Kapllani 72', 78'; Nefiz 76'	Stadium: Heinrich-Graf-Sportanlage; Attendance: 400

6 July 2012	Darmstadt 98	0–2	FSV Frankfurt	Darmstadt
19:00		Report	Stark 42'; Yun 82'	Stadium: Stadion am Böllenfalltor; Attendance: 1.000

8 July 2012	FSV Fernwald	0–3	FSV Frankfurt	Fernwald-Steinbach
17:00		Report	Görlitz 30'; Hofmeier 76', 84'	Stadium: Steinbacher Sportplatz; Attendance: 400

14 July 2012	Mainz 05	2–0	FSV Frankfurt	Mainz
17:00	Choupo-Moting 11'; Ujah 72'	Report		Stadium: Stadion am Bruchweg; Attendance: 1.659

16 July 2012	1. FC Kaiserslautern II	2–0	FSV Frankfurt	Kirn
18:30	Temeltas 33'; Tasky 87'	Report		Stadium: Berno-Wischmann-Stadion; Attendance: 300; Referee: Torsten Bauer

19 July 2012	Bayer Leverkusen II	2–3	FSV Frankfurt	Bad Kreuznach
18:30	Haitz 57'; Siefkes 84'	Report	Nefiz 23'; Kapllani 29'; Oesterhelweg 82'	Stadium: Friedrich-Moebus-Stadion; Attendance: 150

24 July 2012	Bayern Alzenau	1–2	FSV Frankfurt	Alzenau
18:30	Bystrek 74'	Report	Kapllani 3', 42'	Stadium: Sportzentrum am Prischoß; Attendance: 400; Referee: Kai Vonderschmidt

26 July 2012	VfB Stuttgart	4–0	FSV Frankfurt	Donaueschingen
18:30	Harnik 24'; Ibišević 55', 80'; Vecchione 84'	Report		Stadium: Anton-Mall-Stadion; Attendance: 2.000; Referee: Knut Kircher

28 July 2012	Wuppertaler Borussia	1–1	FSV Frankfurt	Wuppertal
17:00	Quotschalla 70'	Report	Kapllani 2'	Stadium: Stadion am Zoo; Attendance: 965; Referee: Sven Waschitzki

8 August 2012	Bayer Leverkusen	7–1	FSV Frankfurt	Königstein im Taunus
18:00	Schürrle 23', 57'; Kießling 26'; Rolfes 33'; Fernandes 47'; Wollscheid 75' 89'	Report	Roshi 36'	Attendance: 800; Referee: Tobias Welz

=== 2. Bundesliga ===
5 August 2012 1	SV Sandhausen	1–1	FSV Frankfurt	Sandhausen
13:30	Tüting 45+1'	Report	40' Verhoek	Stadium: Hardtwaldstadion; Attendance: 4.900; Referee: Christian Dietz

12 August 2012 2	FSV Frankfurt	3–1	Hertha BSC	Frankfurt
15:30	Schlicke 51'; Leckie 63'; Verhoek 90+1'	Report	40' Ben-Hatira	Stadium: Frankfurter Volksbank Stadion; Attendance: 6.329; Referee: Guido Winkmann

26 August 2012 3	FC Ingolstadt	0–2	FSV Frankfurt	Ingolstadt
13:30		Report	42', 77' Kapllani	Stadium: Audi Sportpark; Attendance: 5.612; Referee: Robert Kampka

2 September 2012 4	FSV Frankfurt	1–0	Erzgebirge Aue	Frankfurt
13:30	Kapllani 87'	Report		Stadium: Frankfurter Volksbank Stadion; Attendance: 4.012; Referee: Sascha Stegemann

14 September 2012 5	Energie Cottbus	2–2	FSV Frankfurt	Cottbus
18:00	Kruska 51'; Sanogo 90+1'	Report	45' Görlitz; 86' Heubach	Stadium: Stadion der Freundschaft; Attendance: 10.653; Referee: Benjamin Brand

21 September 2012 6	FSV Frankfurt	2–1	FC St. Pauli	Frankfurt
18:00	Roshi 7'; Kapllani 62'	Report	58' Ginczek	Stadium: Frankfurter Volksbank Stadion; Attendance: 8.849; Referee: Thorsten Schriever

25 September 2012 7	1. FC Köln	2–1	FSV Frankfurt	Köln
17:30	Strobl 46'; Chihi 82'	Report	90' Verhoek	Stadium: RheinEnergieStadion; Attendance: 32.000; Referee: Felix Zwayer

28 September 2012 8	VfR Aalen	3–0	FSV Frankfurt	Aalen
18:00	Dausch 19'; Hofmann 51'; Valentini 88'	Report		Stadium: Scholz-Arena; Attendance: 5.841; Referee: Marcel Unger

5 October 2012 9	FSV Frankfurt	1–1	SC Paderborn	Frankfurt
18:00	Kapllani 90+3'	Report	70' Hofmann	Stadium: Frankfurter Volksbank Stadion; Attendance: 3.185; Referee: Benjamin Cortus

21 October 2012 10	Union Berlin	1–0	FSV Frankfurt	Berlin
13:30	Mattuschka 17'	Report		Stadium: Stadion An der Alten Försterei; Attendance: 15,701; Referee: Thorsten Schriever

28 October 2012 11	FSV Frankfurt	3–1	Jahn Regensburg	Frankfurt
13:30	Leckie 13'; Görlitz 56'; Bambara 90+1'	Report	84' Sembolo	Stadium: Frankfurter Volksbank Stadion; Attendance: 3,301; Referee: Christian Fischer

3 November 2012 12	MSV Duisburg	1–2	FSV Frankfurt	Duisburg
13:00	Exslager 80'	Report	34' Konrad; 38' Verhoek	Stadium: Schauinsland-Reisen-Arena; Attendance: 8,617; Referee: Robert Kampka

11 November 2012 13	FSV Frankfurt	0–1	1860 Munich	Frankfurt
13:30		Report	36' Lauth	Stadium: Frankfurter Volksbank Stadion; Attendance: 5,188; Referee: Markus Wingenbach

16 November 2012 14	Dynamo Dresden	2–1	FSV Frankfurt	Dresden
18:00	Schuppan 5', 15'	Report	64' Leckie	Stadium: Glücksgas-Stadion; Attendance: 20,133; Referee: Florian Steuer

24 November 2012 15	FSV Frankfurt	0–1	1. FC Kaiserslautern	Frankfurt
13:00		Report	18' Bunjaku	Stadium: Frankfurter Volksbank Stadion; Attendance: 10,470; Referee: Christian Leicher

27 November 2012 16	VfL Bochum	1–3	FSV Frankfurt	Bochum
17:30	Tasaka 87'	Report	21' Teixeira; 54' Kapllani; 60' Verhoek	Stadium: rewirpowerStadion; Attendance: 8,365; Referee: Frank Willenborg

2 December 2012 17	FSV Frankfurt	1–2	Eintracht Braunschweig	Frankfurt
13:30	Konrad 87'	Report	12' Kruppke; 33' Ademi	Stadium: Frankfurter Volksbank Stadion; Attendance: 4,748; Referee: Robert Hartmann

7 December 2012 18	FSV Frankfurt	3–1	SV Sandhausen	Frankfurt
18:00	Verhoek 2'; Yun 13'; Kapllani 83'	Report	12' Ulm	Stadium: Frankfurter Volksbank Stadion; Attendance: 2,612; Referee: Robert Kempter

15 December 2012 19	Hertha BSC	2–1	FSV Frankfurt	Berlin
13:00	Ndjeng 82'; Ronny 84'	Report	55' Görlitz	Stadium: Olympiastadion; Attendance: 29,851; Referee: Tobias Christ

3 February 2013 20	FSV Frankfurt	0–2	FC Ingolstadt	Frankfurt
13:30		Report	57' Lappe; 67' Caiuby	Stadium: Frankfurter Volksbank Stadion; Attendance: 3,056; Referee: Robert Kampka

8 February 2013 21	Erzgebirge Aue	0–2	FSV Frankfurt	Aue
18:00		Report	62' Verhoek; 77' Stark	Stadium: Sparkassen-Erzgebirgsstadion; Attendance: 6,500; Referee: Benjamin Cortus

17 February 2013 22	FSV Frankfurt	1–0	Energie Cottbus	Frankfurt
13:30	Jönsson 39'	Report		Stadium: Frankfurter Volksbank Stadion; Attendance: 3,383; Referee: Bibiana Steinhaus

22 February 2013 23	FC St. Pauli	3–0	FSV Frankfurt	Hamburg
18:00	Ginczek 28', 52', 76'	Report		Stadium: Millerntor-Stadion; Attendance: 26,398; Referee: Robert Kempter

3 March 2013 24	FSV Frankfurt	1–1	1. FC Köln	Frankfurt
13:30	Yelen 76'	Report	83' Clemens	Stadium: Frankfurter Volksbank Stadion; Attendance: 10,470; Referee: Marco Fritz

8 March 2013 25	FSV Frankfurt	6–1	VfR Aalen	Frankfurt
18:00	Verhoek 24'; Leckie 35'; Schlicke 39'; Bambara 54'; Yelen 68', 86'	Report	88' Haller	Stadium: Frankfurter Volksbank Stadion; Attendance: 4,178; Referee: Benjamin Brand

15 March 2013 26	SC Paderborn	3–0	FSV Frankfurt	Paderborn
18:00	Meha 21'; Görlitz 84' (o.g.); Bertels 90'	Report		Stadium: Benteler Arena; Attendance: 5,397; Referee: Markus Wingenbach

31 March 2013 27	FSV Frankfurt	3–0	Union Berlin	Frankfurt
13:30	Yelen 10', 49'; Görlitz 19'	Report		Stadium: Frankfurter Volksbank Stadion; Attendance: 4,842; Referee: Christian Leicher

6 April 2013 28	Jahn Regensburg	1–4	FSV Frankfurt	Regensburg
13:00	Hein 78'	Report	56' Stark; 72' Yelen; 84', 88' Kapllani	Stadium: Städtisches Jahnstadion; Attendance: 7,300; Referee: Markus Wingenbach

13 April 2013 29	FSV Frankfurt	1–1	MSV Duisburg	Frankfurt
13:00	Gaus 23'	Report	13' Brosinski	Stadium: Frankfurter Volksbank Stadion; Attendance: 5,429; Referee: Marcel Unger

20 April 2013 30	1860 Munich	1–2	FSV Frankfurt	München
13:00	Friend 70'	Report	20' Stark; 33' Görlitz	Stadium: Allianz Arena; Attendance: 14,200; Referee: Thorsten Schriever

27 April 2013 31	FSV Frankfurt	3–1	Dynamo Dresden	Frankfurt
13:00	Stark 55'; Verhoek 67'; Roshi 84'	Report	86' Fort	Stadium: Frankfurter Volksbank Stadion; Attendance: 6,075; Referee: Sascha Stegemann

5 May 2013 32	1. FC Kaiserslautern	4–1	FSV Frankfurt	Kaiserslautern
13:30	Bunjaku 27', 45'; Torrejón 40'; Köhler 45'	Report	85' Kapllani	Stadium: Fritz-Walter-Stadion; Attendance: 38,792; Referee: Michael Weiner

12 May 2013 33	FSV Frankfurt	2–1	VfL Bochum	Frankfurt
13:30	Gaus 22'; Verhoek 68'	Report	48' Toski	Stadium: Frankfurter Volksbank Stadion; Attendance: 7,572; Referee: Dr. Jochen Drees

19 May 2013 34	Eintracht Braunschweig	2–2	FSV Frankfurt	Braunschweig
13:30	Kruppke 2', 50'	Report	11' Görlitz; 50' Kapllani	Stadium: Eintracht-Stadion; Attendance: 21,000; Referee: Christian Dietz

=== DFB-Pokal ===
17 August 2012 1R	SG Sonnenhof Großaspach	1–2	FSV Frankfurt	Aspach
19:00	Szimayer 16'	report	21' Stark; 22' Leckie	Stadium: Comtech Arena; Attendance: 1.436; Referee: Benjamin Brand

31 October 2012 2R	VfL Wolfsburg	2–0	FSV Frankfurt	Wolfsburg
20:30	Diego 51'; Dost 61'	Report		Stadium: Volkswagen Arena; Attendance: 7,538; Referee: Manuel Gräfe
