= Schick =

Schick may refer to:

- Schick (razors), a brand of safety razors

== People ==
- Alfredo Catalán Schick (born 1968), Venezuelan politician
- Allen Schick, American scholar
- Béla Schick (1877–1967), Hungarian-American pediatrician, known for the Schick test
- Clemens Schick (born 1972), German actor
- Conrad Schick (1822–1901), German architect, archaeologist and Protestant missionary
- Doyle Schick (1939–2001), American football cornerback in the National Football League
- Eliezer Shlomo Schick (1940–2015), Hasidic rabbi
- Franz Schick (born 1960), German footballer
- George Schick (1908–1985), Czech-American conductor, vocal coach, accompanist, and music educator
- George V. Schick (died 1964), American Lutheran biblical scholar and translator of Martin Luther
- Gerhard Schick (born 1972), German politician
- Gottlieb Schick (1776–1812), German painter
- Henry Schick, pioneer barn-builder of Idaho
- Jacob Schick (1877–1937), Inventor of dry shaving
- Lawrence Schick, American game designer and writer
- Ludwig Schick (born 1949), Roman Catholic prelate
- Marion Schick (born 1958), German manager, politician and professor
- Marjorie Schick (1941–2017), American jewelry artist and academic
- Marvin Schick (1934–2020), American political scientist and constitutional law professor
- Michael Schick (footballer) (born 1988), German footballer
- Morrie Schick (1892–1979), American baseball player
- Moshe Schick (1807–1879), Hungarian rabbi
- Patrik Schick (born 1996), Czech footballer
- René Schick Gutiérrez (1909–1966), President of Nicaragua in 1963–1966
- Robert Schick (born 1993), German footballer
- RoseAnna Schick, Canadian entertainment publicist
- Steven Schick (born 1954), American musician
- Thomas Schick (born 1969), German mathematician
- Theodore Schick, author in the field of philosophy
- Thorsten Schick (born 1990), Austrian footballer
- Thorsten Schick (politician) (born 1971), German politician

== See also ==
- Schick test, a test to determine susceptibility to diphtheria
- Shick (disambiguation)
