= Reinsdorf =

Reinsdorf may refer to:

- Reinsdorf, Saxony-Anhalt, a municipality in the district Burgenlandkreis, Saxony-Anhalt, Germany
- Reinsdorf, Saxony, a municipality in the district Zwickauer Land, Saxony, Germany
- Reinsdorf, Thuringia, a municipality in the district Kyffhäuserkreis, Thuringia, Germany
- August Reinsdorf, German anarchist
- Jerry Reinsdorf, sports teams owner
