= Marcel Halstenberg =

German footballer

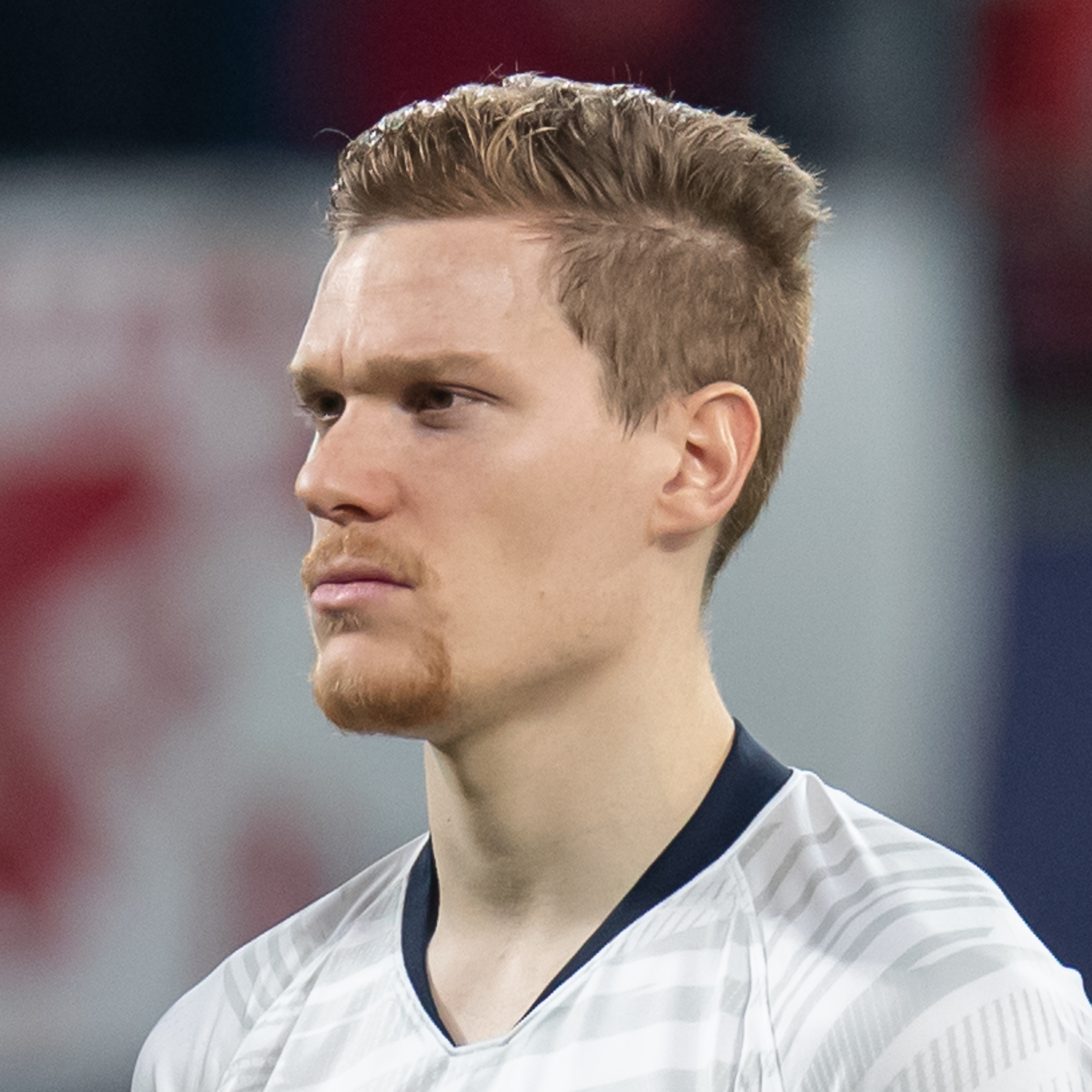
- Halstenberg with RB Leipzig in 2020

Personal information
- Date of birth: 27 September 1991 (age 35)
- Place of birth: Laatzen, Germany
- Height: 1.88 m (6 ft 2 in)
- Positions: Left-back; centre-back

Team information
- Current team: Germania Grasdorf
- Number: 23

Youth career
- 1995–1999: Germania Grasdorf
- 1999–2010: Hannover 96

Senior career*
Years	Team	Apps	(Gls)
2010–2011	Hannover 96 II	19	(0)
2011–2013	Borussia Dortmund II	68	(6)
2013–2015	FC St. Pauli	54	(6)
2015–2023	RB Leipzig	189	(14)
2023–2025	Hannover 96	60	(8)
2025	Germania Grasdorf	2	(4)

International career
2017–2021	Germany	9	(1)
- * Club domestic league appearances and goals as of 17 August 2025

Marcel Halstenberg (born 27 September 1991) is a German former professional footballer who played as a left-back or centre-back. He started his career with Hannover 96 II, before playing for other clubs in Germany, including RB Leipzig, FC St. Pauli, and Borussia Dortmund II across his career.

== Club career ==
=== Hannover 96 II ===
Born in Laatzen, Germany, Halstenberg grew up in Hannover and started his career at Germania Grasdorf before joining Hannover 96. After spending eleven years progressing through the Hannover 96 youth system, he was eventually promoted to Hannover 96 II. Halstenberg initially started out as a striker before moving to defence. He went on to make nineteen appearances for Hannover 96 II during the 2010–11 season.

=== Borussia Dortmund II ===
On 8 April 2011, it was announced that Halstenberg joined Borussia Dortmund II.

He made his Borussia Dortmund II debut, starting the whole game, in a 2–0 win over 1. FC Kaiserslautern II in the opening game of the season. Since joining the club, Halstenberg became a regular in the starting eleven at Borussia Dortmund II. Following his performance in a 4–0 win over rivals’ FC Schalke 04 II, Manager David Wagner praised his performance for playing in the unfamiliar position for the first time. It wasn't until on 28 March 2012 when he scored his first goal for Borussia Dortmund II, in a 4–2 win over Eintracht Trier. Halstenberg later added more goals to his tally, scoring against TuS Koblenz and SC Verl. Despite suffering from injuries during the 2011–12 season, Halstenberg finished his first season, making 32 appearances and scoring three times for Borussia Dormund II.

In the 2012–13 season, Halstenberg began to play in the left–back position since the start of the season. It wasn't until on 3 August 2012 when he scored his first Borussia Dortmund II goal of the season, in a 1–1 draw against Alemannia Aachen. His performance attracted interests from Borussia Dortmund's first team and saw him promoted to the senior team in January 2013. However, he appeared three times as an unused substitute in the club's first team matches: two coming from the league and one coming from the UEFA Champions League. Despite this, Halstenberg continued to feature for the Borussia Dortmund II side for the remainder of the 2012–13 season. At the end of the 2012–13 season, he went on to make thirty–six appearances and scoring three times in all competitions.

Halstenberg reflected his time at Borussia Dortmund, saying: "They are nice memories. David Wagner brought me back then. We moved up to the 3rd league in the first year and held the class there in the second year. That was a great time. I was allowed to practice with the pros from time to time. That helped me a lot and my athletic career."

=== FC St. Pauli ===
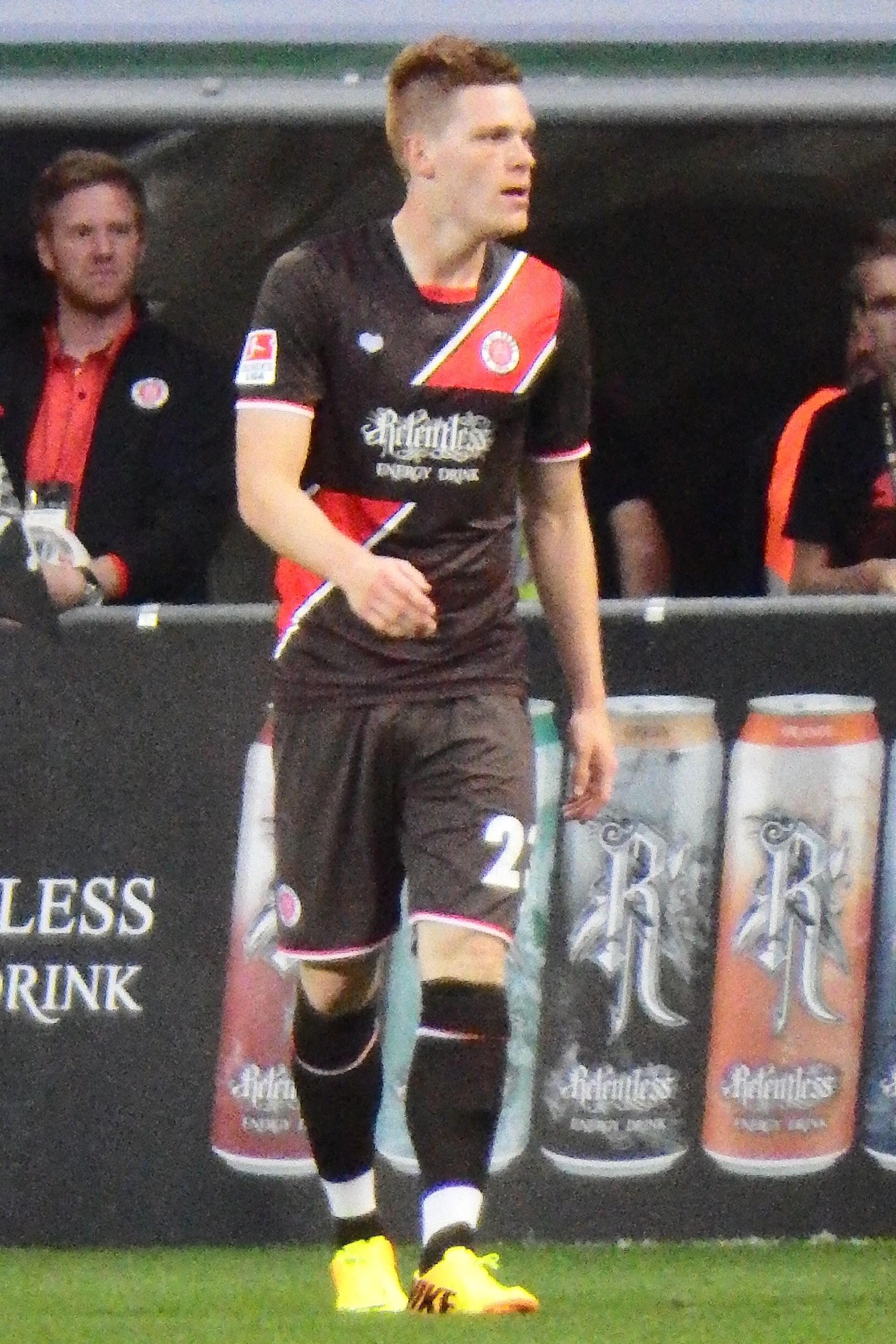
Halstenberg playing for FC St. Pauli in 2013.

Halstenberg signed a three-year contract with FC St. Pauli as a free agent, after his contract had expired with Borussia Dortmund at the end of the 2012–13 Bundesliga campaign.

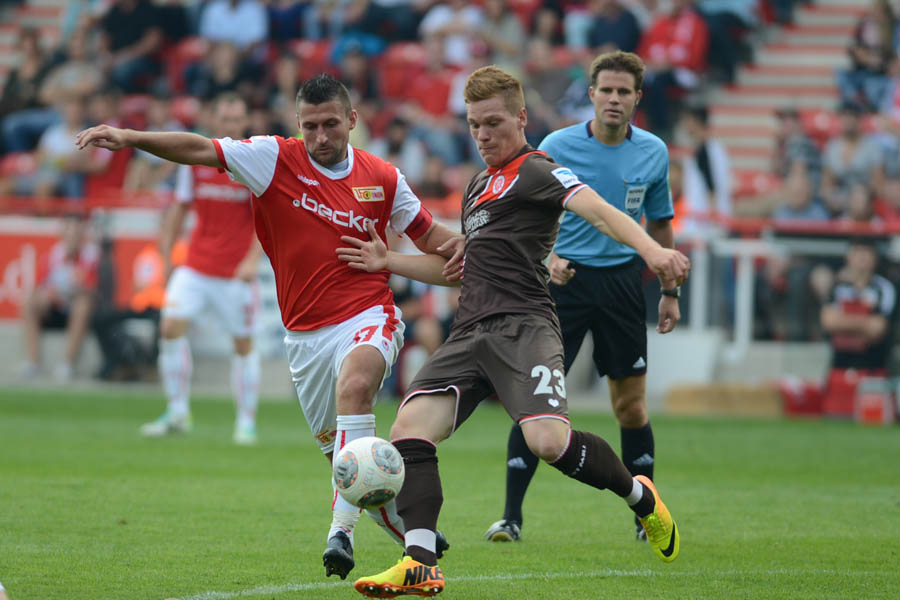
Halstenberg fighting for the ball against Union Berlin's Torsten Mattuschka in August 2013.

Halstenberg made his FC St. Pauli debut in the opening game of the season, starting the whole game, in a 1–0 win over TSV 1860 Munich. Since making his FC St. Pauli debut, he quickly established himself in the starting eleven, where he faced competition from another left–back position player, Sebastian Schachten. He continued to start in the left–back position until Schachten's return in December 2013 and found himself, coming on as a substitute on two occasions and at one point, played in the left–midfield position. It wasn't until on 23 February 2014 when Halstenberg scored his first goal for the club, scoring from a direct free kick, in a 2–1 win over Dynamo Dresden. In a follow-up match against Union Berlin, he played a vital role when he set up two goals, as FC St. Pauli won 2–1. Halstenberg then set up another two goals, setting up the first and second goal, as FC St. Pauli beat SV Sandhausen 3–2 on 5 April 2014. Towards the end of the 2013–14 season, he then began to play in the midfield positions following Schachten regaining his left–back position. At the end of the 2013–14 season, Halstenberg went on to make thirty–two appearances and scoring once in all competitions.

In the 2014–15 season, Halstenberg, however, suffered an injuries that saw him missed the start of the season. After returning to the reserve team from injuries, he made his first appearance of the season, starting the whole game, in a 4–1 loss against RB Leipzig. In a follow–up match against 1. FC Kaiserslautern, Halstenberg scored his first goal of the season, in a 3–1 loss. Since returning to the first team, he regained his first team place in the left–back position, competing with Daniel Buballa throughout the season. Halsternberg later two more goals later in the 2014–15 season against 1. FC Kaiserslautern and VfL Bochum. Despite being sidelined for one more game later in the 2014–15 season, he went on to make twenty–two appearances and scoring two times in all competitions.

Ahead of the 2015–16 season, Halstenberg was linked with a move away from the club, with his hometown club, Hannover 96 interested. Hastlenberg, himself, stated he wanted to leave the club, describing it as the next step. Despite, Halstenberg continued to regain his first team place. He scored his first goal of the season, in a 2–1 win over Karlsruher SC on 2 August 2015. This was followed up by scoring his second goal of the season, in a 3–2 win over Greuther Fürth. However, he suffered an injury once again that saw him sidelined throughout August. By the time of his departure, Halstenberg made three appearances and scoring once for the side.

=== RB Leipzig ===
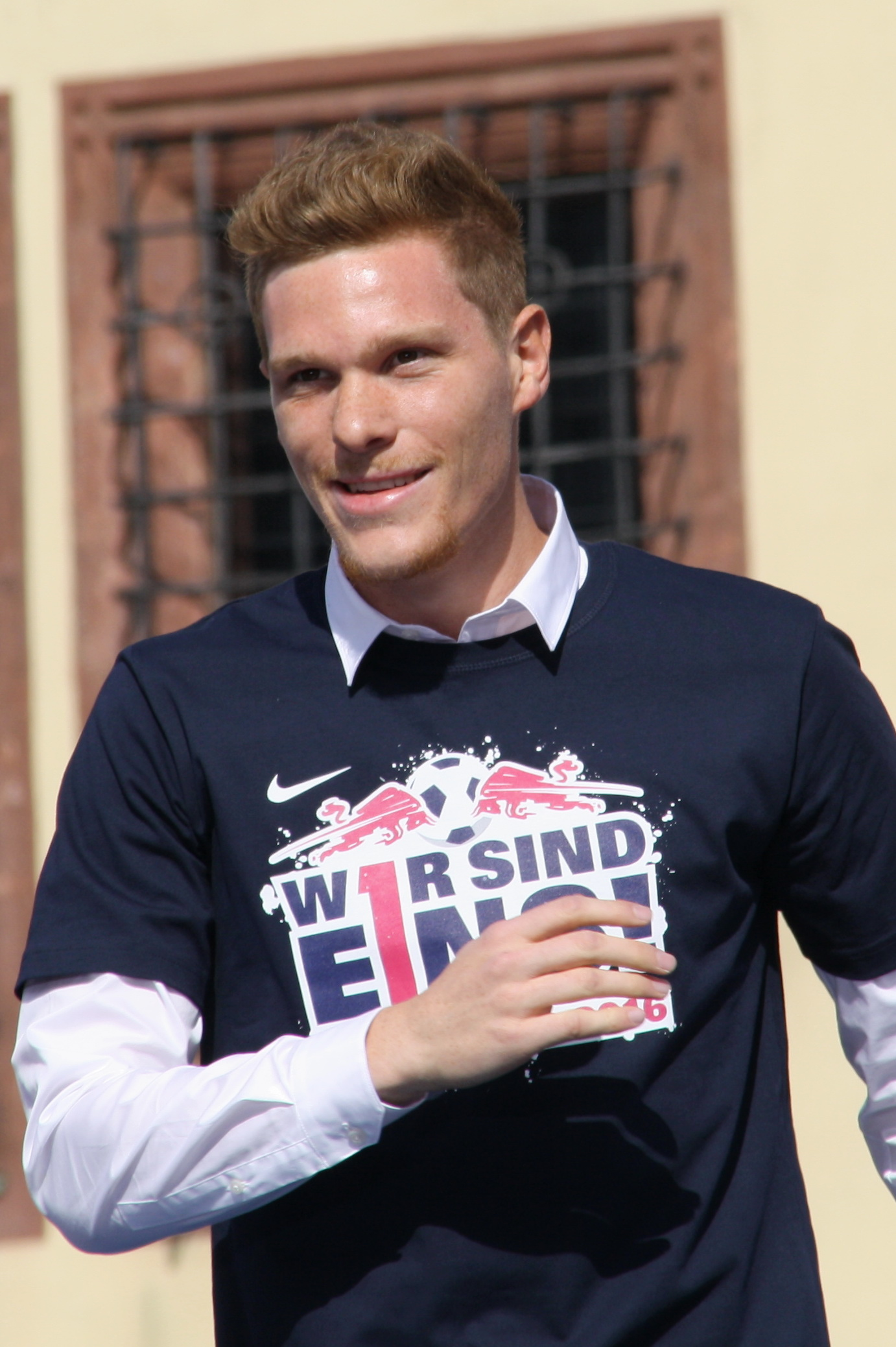
Halstenberg celebrating promotion to the Bundesliga with RB Leipzig in 2016.

He joined RB Leipzig on 31 August 2015, signing on a four–year contract for an undisclosed fee (it was reported to have cost three million euros). However, his move to RB Leipzig caused outrage among FC St. Pauli supporters.

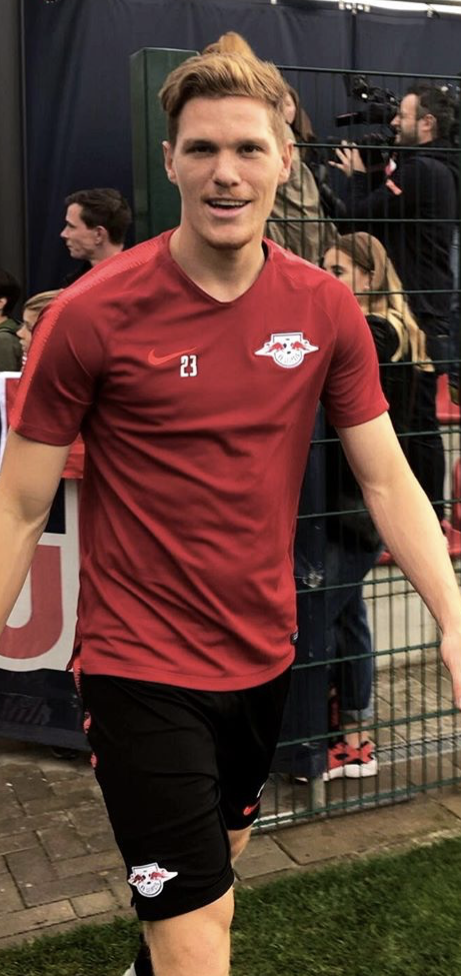
Halstenberg training with the club in October 2018.

Halstenberg made his RB Leipzig debut, starting the whole game, in a 2–0 win over Paderborn 07 on 11 September 2015. In a follow–up match, he scored his first goal for the club, in a 1–1 draw against 1. FC Heidenheim. Since joining the club, he became a first team regular for the side and found himself in a competition in the left–back position with Anthony Jung. Halstenberg then scored his second goal of the season, in a 2–1 win over SV Sandhausen on 1 November 2015. He later set up two goals, setting up the first goal and the third goal, in a 4–2 win over MSV Duisburg on 6 December 2015. Despite being sidelined later in the 2015–16 season, Halstenberg remain featured in the first team, as he played nearly every minute of Leipzig's successful campaign in the 2. Bundesliga, and as a left-back, was instrumental in Leipzig's league-leading defense. In his first season at RB Leipzig, Halstenberg made twenty–five appearances and scoring two times in all competitions.

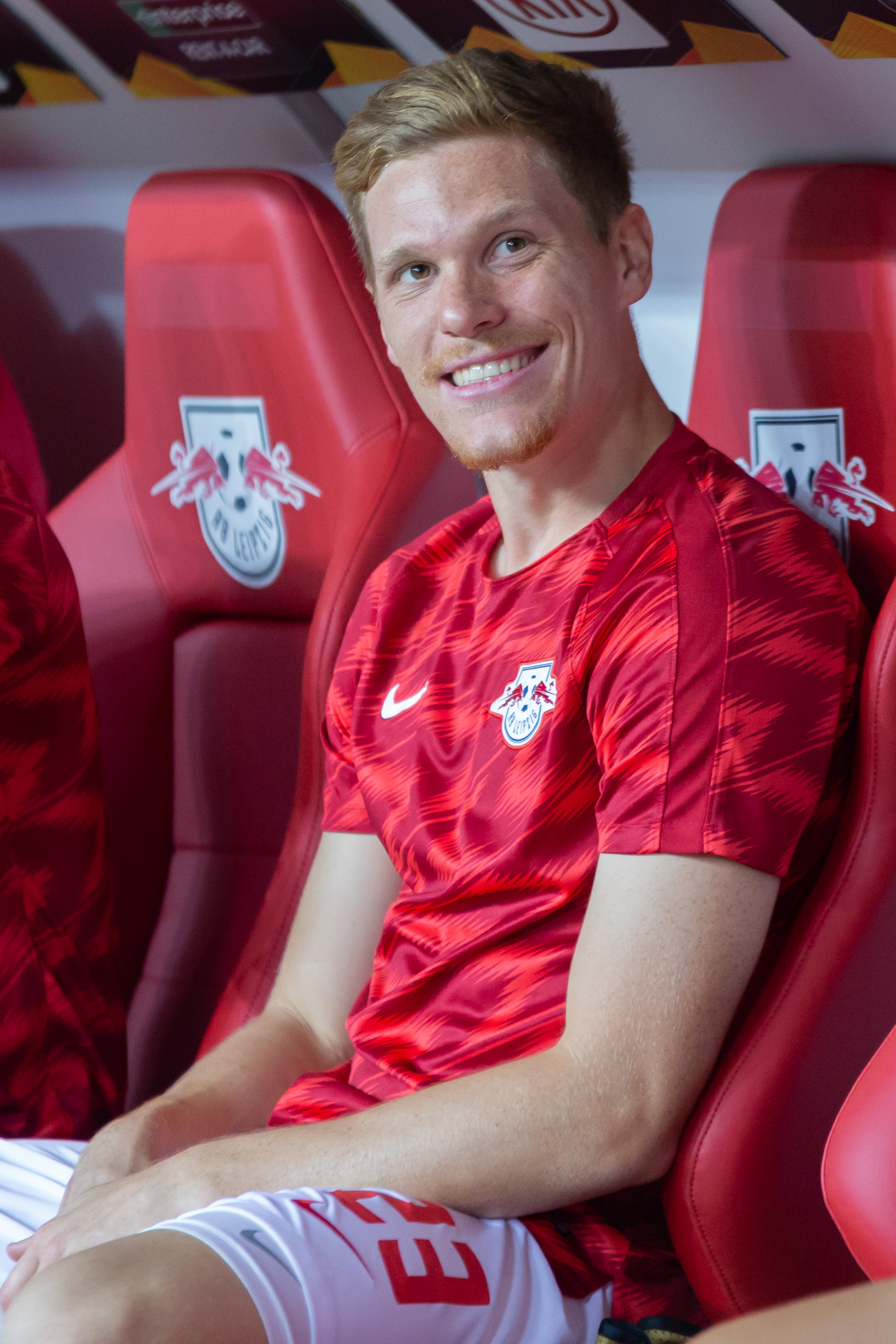
Halstenberg on the bench in a match against Red Bull Salzburg in September 2018.

In the 2016–17 season, Halstenberg made his Bundesliga debut, starting the whole game, in a 2–2 draw against TSG 1899 Hoffenheim in the opening game of the season. He continued to remain a first team regular, playing in the left–back position. His performance soon earned himself praised by the German media. After suffering from an injury in December, he returned to the starting lineup against Eintracht Frankfurt on 21 January 2017, setting up two goals: the first goal and the third goal, in a 3–0 win. Halstenberg started in every match since the start of the season until he was sidelined with injury in early April. He returned to the starting line-up, playing in the left–back position, in a 4–0 win over SC Freiburg on 15 April 2017. After returning from injury, he missed the last three matches of the season, due to substitute bench. At the end of the 2016–17 season, Halstenberg went on to make thirty–one appearances in all competitions.

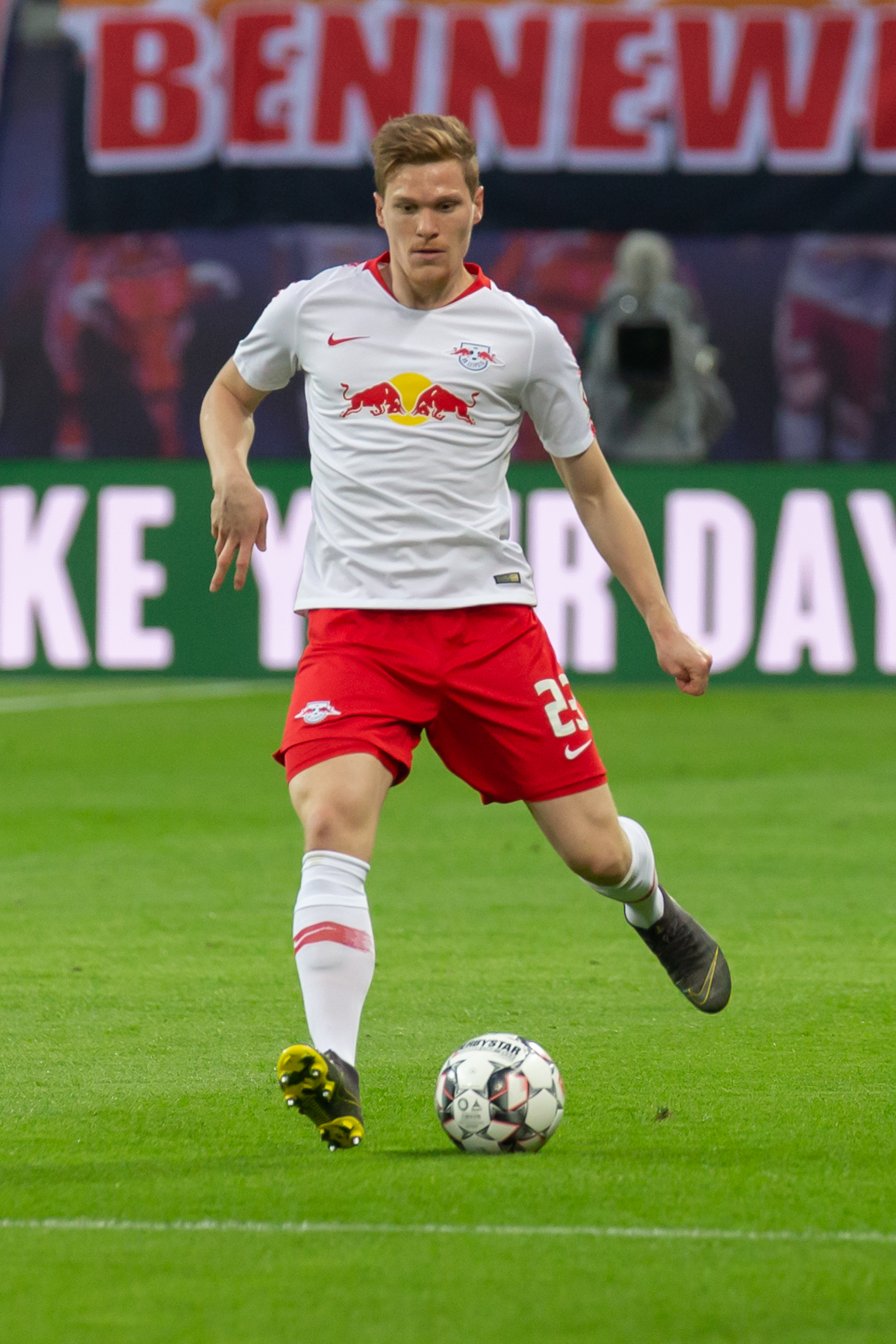
Halstenberg in action against Hertha BSC in March 2019.

In the 2017–18 season, Halstenberg continued to remain a first team regular, playing in the left–back position at the start of the season. Halstenberg set up a goal, setting up the first one, in a 4–1 win over SC Freiburg on 27 August 2017. He made his UEFA Champions League debut, starting the whole game, in a 1–1 draw against AS Monaco on 13 September 2017. It wasn't until on 12 December 2017 when Halstenberg scored his first goal of the season, in a 1–1 draw against VfL Wolfsburg. This was followed up by scoring his second goal of the season, in a 3–2 loss against Hertha BSC. However, Halstenberg was later plagued with injuries and eventually sidelined for the rest of the 2017–18 season. While on the sidelines, he signed a contract extension with the club, keeping him until 2022. At the end of the 2017–18 season, Halstenberg went on to make twenty–three appearances and scoring two times in all competitions.

At the start of the 2018–19 season, Halstenberg was sidelined with injuries, as he returned to training in July. It wasn't until on 23 September 2018 when he made his first appearance of the season, coming on as a late substitute, in a 1–1 draw against Eintracht Frankfurt. Since returning to the first team, Halstenberg regained his first team place, playing in the left–back position. In addition to playing in the left–back position, he also plays in the left–midfield position in a number of matches. It wasn't until on 1 February 2019 when Halstenberg scored his first goal of the season, as well as, setting up the second goal, in a 3–1 win over Hannover 96. In the quarter–finals of DFB-Pokal, he scored his second goal of the season, in a 2–1 win over FC Augsburg on 2 April 2019. Eighteen days later, on 20 April 2019, Halstenberg scored twice for the side, in a 2–1 win over Borussia Mönchengladbach. He started the whole game in the final against Bayern Munich, as RB Leipzig lost 3–0. At the end of the 2018–19 season, Halstenberg went on to make thirty–seven appearances and scoring four times in all competitions.

=== Return to Hannover 96 ===
On 19 July 2023, Halstenberg returned to his hometown and boyhood club Hannover 96.

On 8 May 2025, Halstenberg announced that he would retire from professional football after the end of the 2024–25 season. He will continue playing at an amateur level for his first youth club, Germania Grasdorf.

== International career ==
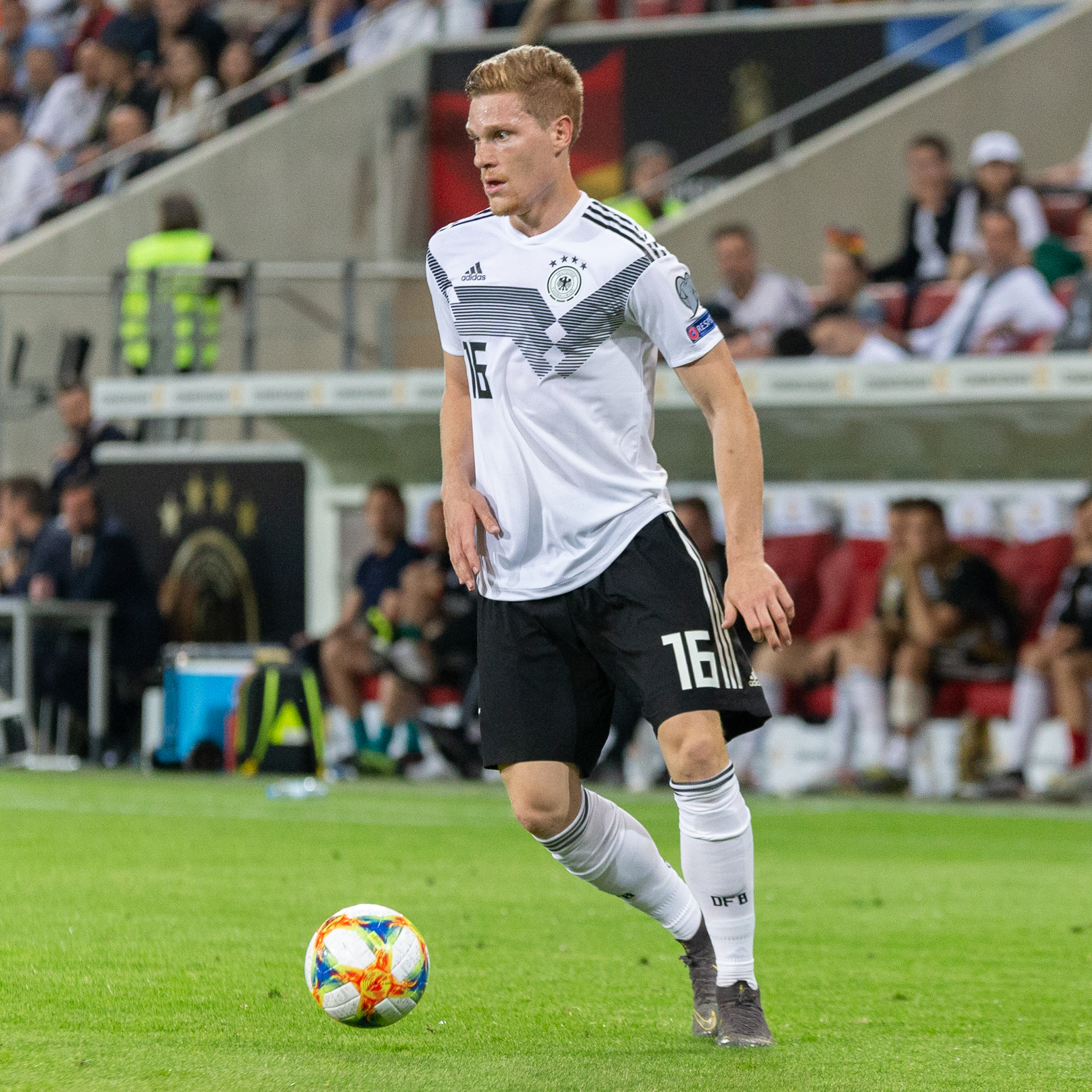
Halstenberg in action for Germany's match against Estonia in the UEFA Euro 2020 qualifier.

On 3 November 2017, it was announced that Halstenberg was called up for the Germany senior team for the first time. It was described as a "surprise" by kicker.

Halstenberg made his international debut on 10 November 2017 for Germany in a friendly match against England, starting as a left back and played the whole game, as they drew 0–0. It wasn't until on 20 March 2019 when he made another appearance for Germany, coming on as a substitute, in a 1–1 draw against Serbia.

On 9 September 2019 he scored his first goal for Germany in a 2–0 away win against Northern Ireland.

On 19 May 2021, he was selected to the squad for the UEFA Euro 2020.

== Personal life ==
Halstenberg has a brother, Benjamin Halstenberg, who is also a footballer. The pair played against each other, as Borussia Dortmund II won 7–1 against his brother's team, SC Wiedenbrück on 29 August 2011. Growing up, he supported Borussia Dortmund.

In February 2016, while on the sidelines due to injury, Halstenberg caused controversy when he took a selfie with his girlfriend at the Holocaust Memorial. In response, he apologised for his actions. In June 2017, Halstenberg married his long-term girlfriend, Franziska Dzienziol, who is also from Hannover. The couple first met when they were thirteen. In January 2019, their daughter was born.

== Career statistics ==
=== Club ===
As of match played 18 May 2025.

Appearances and goals by club, season and competition
Club	Season	League			Cup		Continental		Other		Total	
Club	Season	Division	Apps	Goals	Apps	Goals	Apps	Goals	Apps	Goals	Apps	Goals
Hannover 96 II	2010–11	Regionalliga Nord	19	0	—		—		—		19	0
Borussia Dortmund II	2011–12	Regionalliga West	32	3	—		—		—		32	3
Borussia Dortmund II	2012–13	3. Liga	36	3	—		—		—		36	3
Borussia Dortmund II	Total		68	6	—		—		—		68	6
FC St. Pauli	2013–14	2. Bundesliga	31	1	1	0	—		—		32	1
FC St. Pauli	2014–15	2. Bundesliga	20	3	0	0	—		—		20	3
FC St. Pauli	2015–16	2. Bundesliga	3	2	0	0	—		—		3	2
FC St. Pauli	Total		54	6	1	0	—		—		55	6
FC St. Pauli II	2014–15	Regionalliga Nord	2	0	—		—		—		2	0
RB Leipzig	2015–16	2. Bundesliga	24	2	1	0	—		—		25	2
RB Leipzig	2016–17	Bundesliga	30	0	1	0	—		—		31	0
RB Leipzig	2017–18	Bundesliga	15	2	2	0	6 (Note: Appearance(s) in UEFA Champions League)	0	—		23	2
RB Leipzig	2018–19	Bundesliga	28	3	5	1	4 (Note: Appearance(s) in UEFA Europa League)	0	—		37	4
RB Leipzig	2019–20	Bundesliga	29	3	2	0	7	0	—		38	3
RB Leipzig	2020–21	Bundesliga	24	2	4	0	3	0	—		31	2
RB Leipzig	2021–22	Bundesliga	8	1	3	0	4	0	—		15	1
RB Leipzig	2022–23	Bundesliga	31	1	4	0	4	0	1 (Note: Appearance in DFL-Supercup)	1	40	2
RB Leipzig	Total		189	14	22	1	28	0	1	1	240	16
Hannover 96	2023–24	2. Bundesliga	32	5	1	1	—		—		33	6
Hannover 96	2024–25	2. Bundesliga	28	3	1	0	—		—		29	3
Hannover 96	Total		60	8	2	1	—		—		62	9
Career total			393	34	25	2	28	0	1	1	444	37

=== International ===
As of match played 19 June 2021

Appearances and goals by national team and year
National team	Year	Apps	Goals
Germany	2017	1	0
Germany	2019	5	1
Germany	2020	2	0
Germany	2021	1	0
Total		9	1

Scores and results list Germany's goal tally first, score column indicates score after each Halstenberg goal.

List of international goals scored by Marcel Halstenberg
No.	Date	Venue	Opponent	Score	Result	Competition
1	9 September 2019	Windsor Park, Belfast, Northern Ireland	Northern Ireland	1–0	2–0	UEFA Euro 2020 qualification

== Honours ==
RB Leipzig

- DFB-Pokal: 2021–22, 2022–23, runner up: 2020–21

Individual

- Bundesliga Team of the Season: 2018–19
