= Nebra (Unstrut) =

- Town
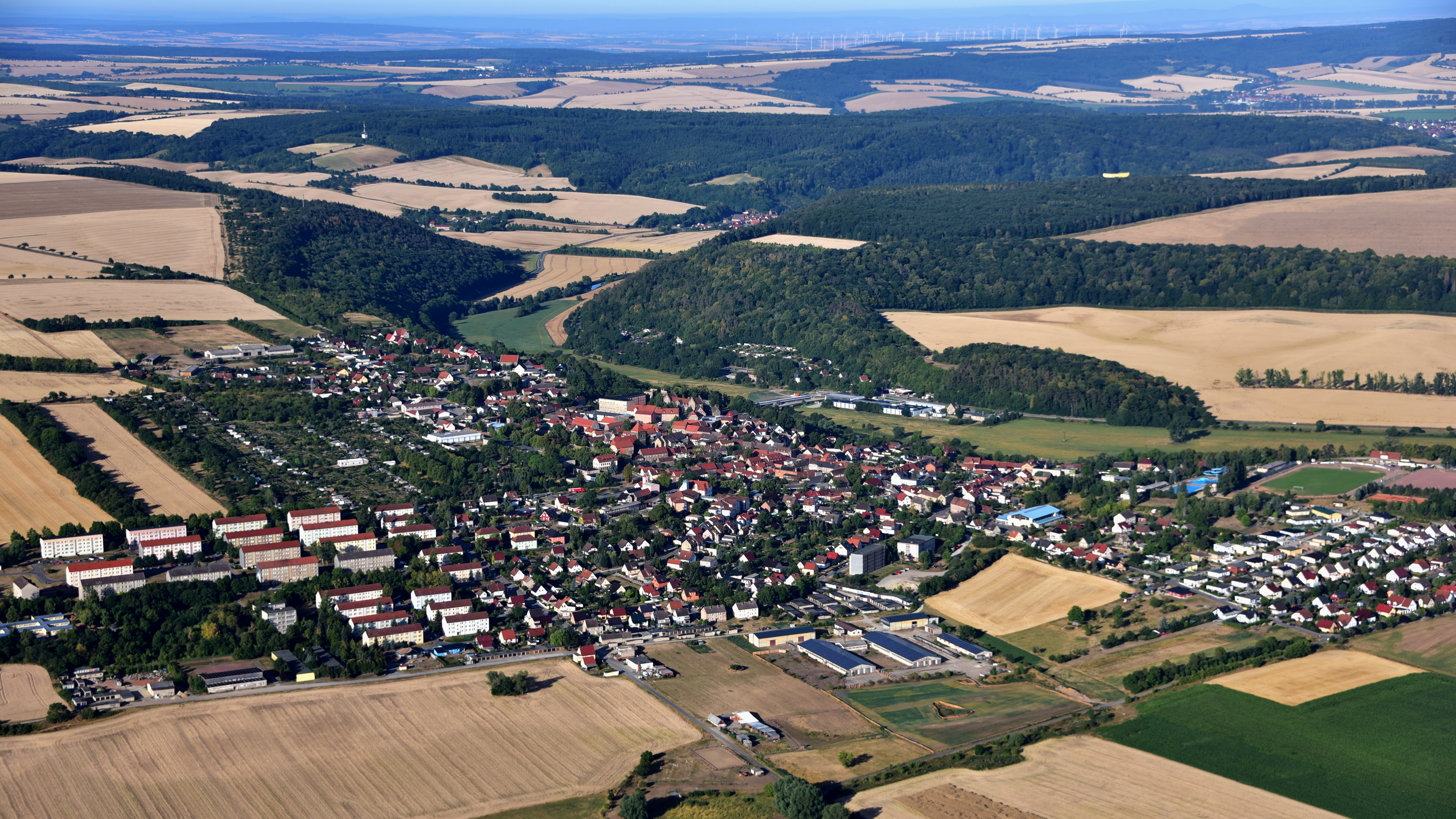

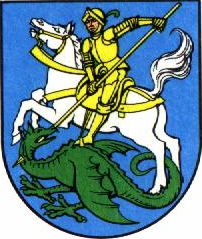
- Coat of arms

- Location of Nebra within Burgenlandkreis district
- Interactive map of Nebra
- Location within Germany Location within Saxony-Anhalt
- Coordinates: 51°17′N 11°34′E
- Country: Germany
- State: Saxony-Anhalt
- District: Burgenlandkreis

Government
  - Mayor (2022–29): Antje Scheschinski

Area
  - Total: 25.42 km^{2} (9.81 sq mi)
- Elevation: 50 m (160 ft)

Population (2025-12-31)
  - Total: 2,956
  - Density: 116.3/km^{2} (301.2/sq mi)
- Time zone: UTC+01:00 (CET)
  - Summer (DST): UTC+02:00 (CEST)
- Postal codes: 06642
- Dialling codes: 034461
- Vehicle registration: BLK
- Website: www.stadt-nebra.de

Nebra (official name: Nebra (Unstrut), pronounced [ˈneːbʁa ˈʊnʃtʁuːt]) is a town in the district of Burgenlandkreis of Saxony-Anhalt, Germany. It is situated on the river Unstrut. Nebra has become nationally and internationally known as the site where the Nebra sky disc, a notable Bronze Age artifact, was discovered. The town has a population of around 3,300.

== Geography ==
=== Location ===
Nebra lies between Querfurt and Naumburg on the Unstrut river in the west of Burgenlandkreis district.

=== Subdivisions ===
Locality	Population
Nebra	2467
Reinsdorf	551
Wangen	551

=== Neighboring communities ===
Neighboring towns are Querfurt, Barnstädt and Steigra (all three in Saalekreis) to the north, Karsdorf to the east, Bad Bibra to the south and Kaiserpfalz to the west.

== History ==
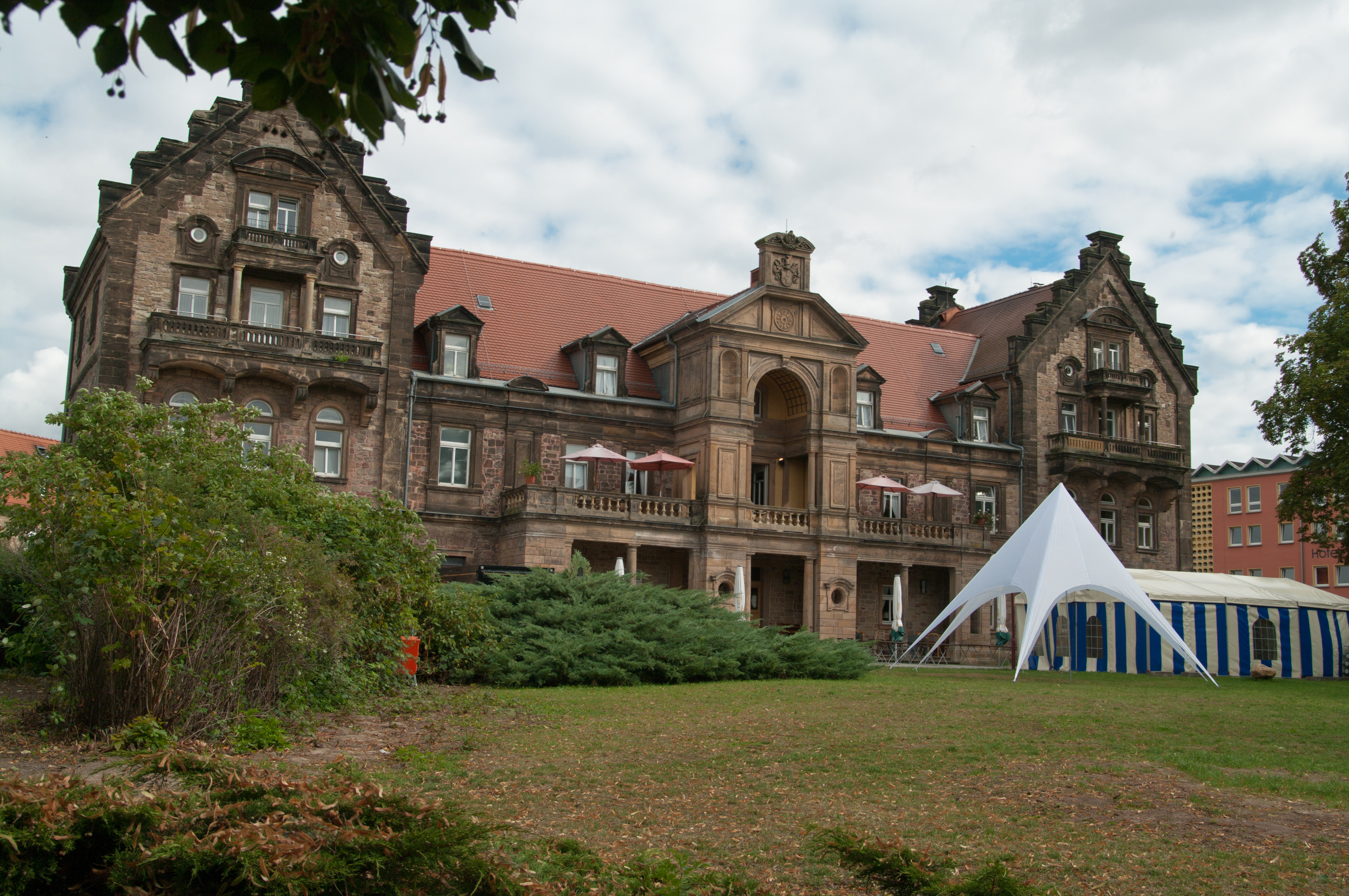
New Castle of Nebra

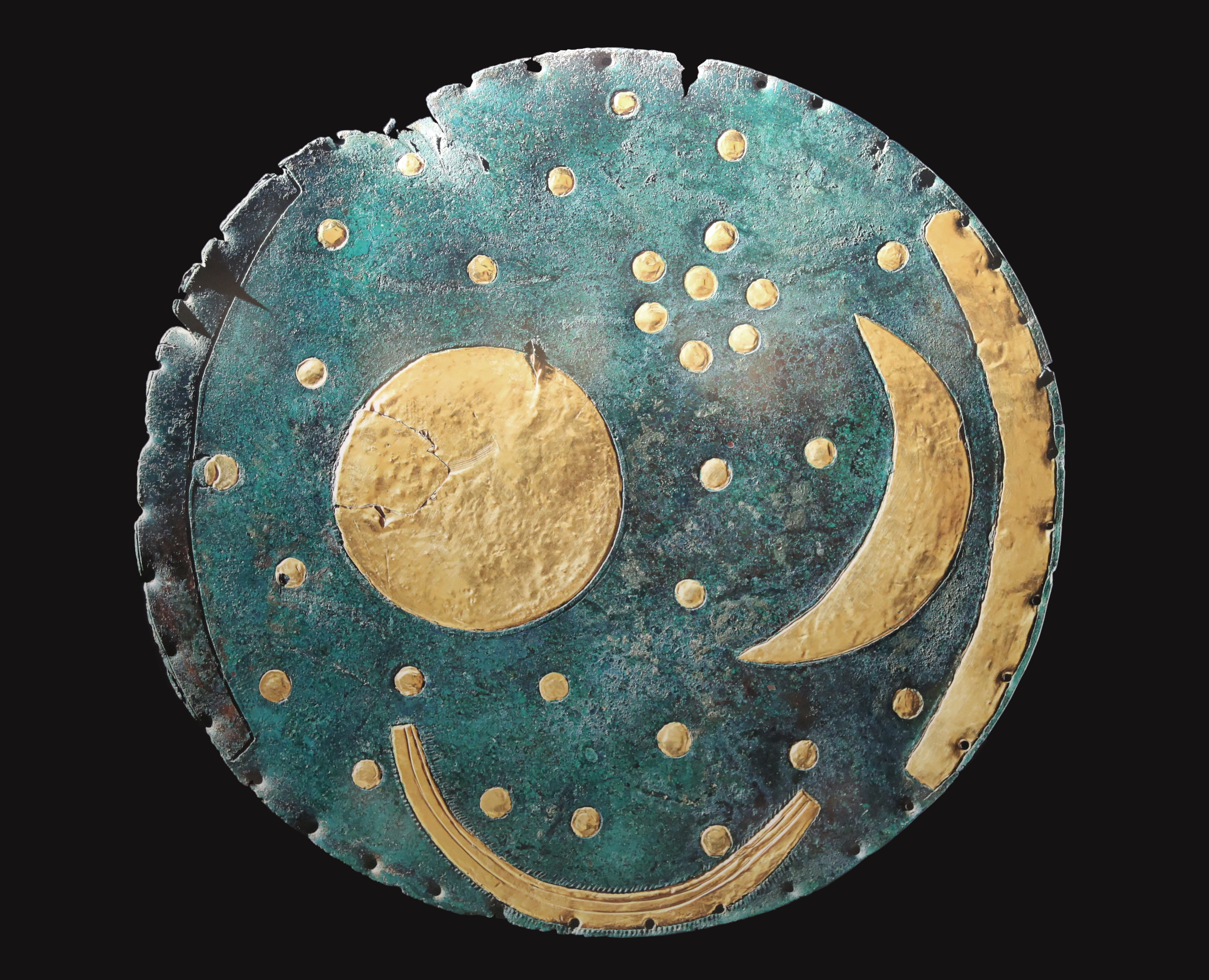
Nebra Sky Disk, a famous artifact of the Bronze Age

The oldest historical documents mentioning Nebra date back to 876. Town privileges were acquired in the 12th century.

Nebra Castle was built in 1540 by the von Nißmitz brothers.

For many centuries, red sandstone was mined in the region which was used for castles and farmhouses.

Between 1952 and 1994, Nebra was the seat of the Nebra municipality in Halle district.

The name of the town was changed on 1 January 1998, from Nebra to Nebra (Unstrut).

On 1 July 2009 the previously separate village of Wangen was merged with Nebra, and on 1 September 2010 the village Reinsdorf was annexed.

Nebra today features the Courths-Mahler archives and Arche Nebra, a museum on the history of the Nebra sky disk. The sky disc itself is exhibited at the Halle State Museum of Prehistory.

In 1962, four Magdalenian figurines were found near Nebra from the late Upper Paleolithic, which belong to the oldest known artwork in Saxony-Anhalt. The figures are 12,000 to 14,000 years old.

The Nebra sky disk was found in Wangen near Nebra in 1999. It only became public in 2002 when the finders tried to sell it and were eventually arrested following a sting operation in Basel, Switzerland. The sky disc is thought to have been created between 2100 and 1700 BCE and to have been buried in approximately 1600 BCE.

== Notable people ==
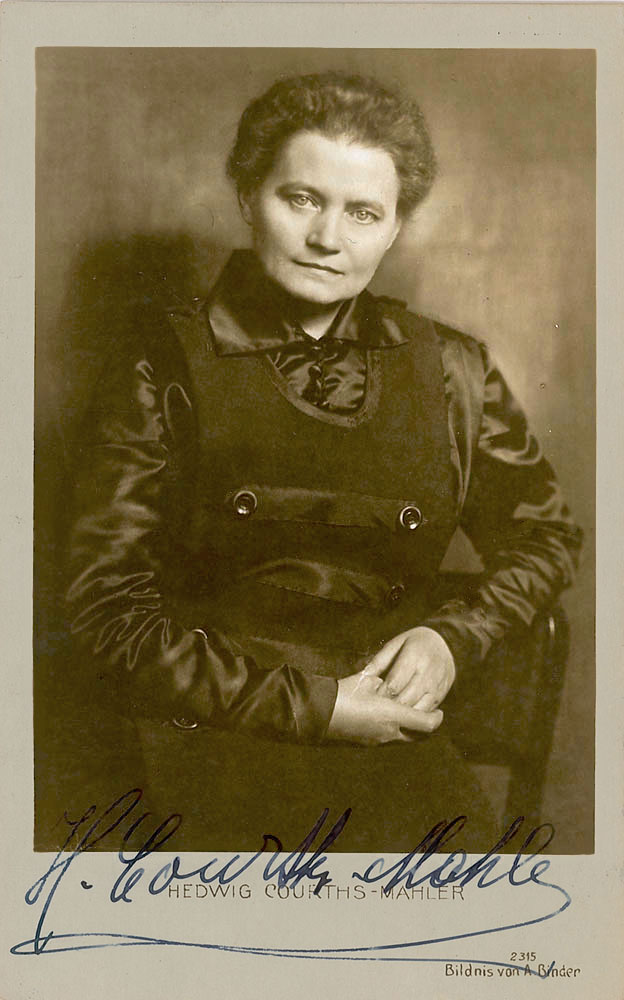
Hedwig Courths-Mahler around 1900

- Gallus Dreßler (1533–around 1585), cantor and composer
- Michael Ranft (1700–1774), was the diaconate to Nebra 1727–1740.
- Hedwig Courths-Mahler (1867–1950), bestseller author
- Karl Artelt (1890–1981), German revolutionary, resided in Nebra 1924–1980, buried in Nebra cemetery
- Dieter Lindner (racewalker) (born 1937), racewalker
- Georg Christoph Biller (1955–2022), chorus conductor and Thomaskantor
