= Shick =

Shick may refer to:

- Rob Shick (born 1957), Canadian National Hockey League referee
- Shick Shack (c. 1727 – c. 1835) was a 19th-century Potawatomi chieftain
- Nicholas Newman and Sharon Collins, a popular supercouple on the American soap opera The Young and the Restless, often called Shick

== See also ==
- Schick (disambiguation)
