= John Verhoek =

Dutch footballer

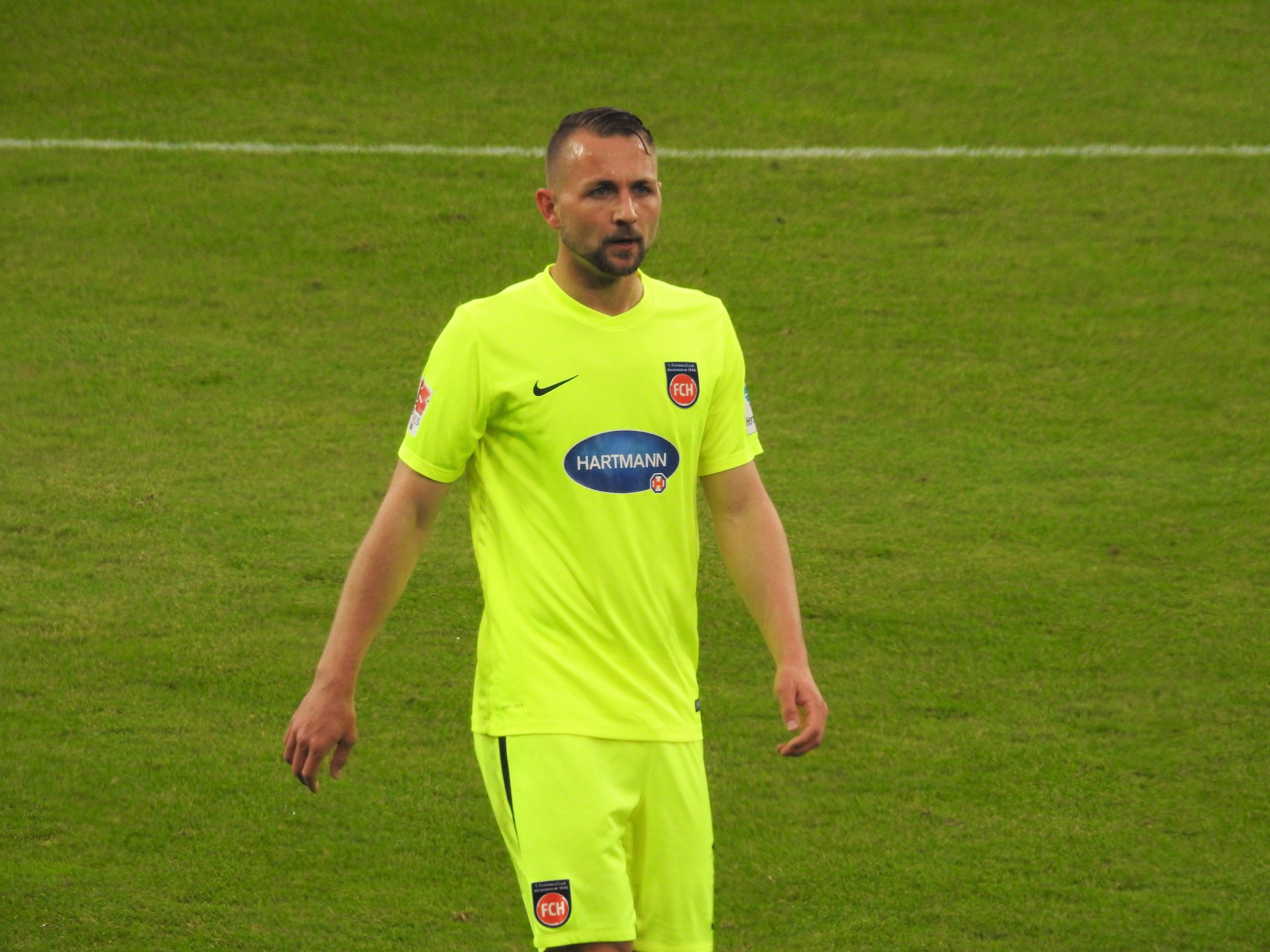
- Verhoek with 1. FC Heidenheim in 2017

Personal information
- Date of birth: 25 March 1989 (age 37)
- Place of birth: Leidschendam, Netherlands
- Height: 1.88 m (6 ft 2 in)
- Position: Striker

Youth career
- 1998–2003: Forum Sport
- 2003–2008: ADO Den Haag

Senior career*
Years	Team	Apps	(Gls)
2008–2010	Dordrecht	49	(7)
2010–2011	Den Bosch	17	(10)
2011–2013	Rennes II	5	(0)
2011–2013	Rennes	7	(0)
2011–2012	→ ADO Den Haag (loan)	23	(5)
2012–2013	→ FSV Frankfurt (loan)	32	(10)
2013–2016	FC St. Pauli	70	(11)
2016–2018	1. FC Heidenheim	53	(15)
2018–2019	MSV Duisburg	22	(0)
2019–2023	Hansa Rostock	117	(36)
2023–2024	VfL Osnabrück	12	(0)
- * Club domestic league appearances and goals as of 22 May 2024

John Verhoek (born 25 March 1989) is a Dutch professional footballer who plays as a striker.

== Career ==
Verhoek had stints at ADO Den Haag and Dordrecht.

Verhoek joined Rennes in January 2011 for a fee of €500,000 after spending six months with Den Bosch in the Eerste Divisie, the second level of Dutch football.

He joined MSV Duisburg in 2018 but left Duisburg on 19 July 2019 for Hansa Rostock, signing a deal with them that will keep him there until 2021.

On 25 July 2023, Verhoek's contract with Hansa was terminated by mutual consent.

On the next day, Verhoek signed with VfL Osnabrück in 2. Bundesliga.

== Personal life ==
John Verhoek's brother Wesley Verhoek is also a professional footballer.

== Career statistics ==
=== Club ===
As of match played 1 August 2020

Appearances and goals by club, season and competition
Club	Season	League			National Cup		Other		Total	
Club	Season	Division	Apps	Goals	Apps	Goals	Apps	Goals	Apps	Goals
Dordrecht	2008–09	Eerste Divisie	18	0	0	0	2 (Note: Appearances in the Eerste Divisie promotion play-offs)	0	20	0
Dordrecht	2009–10	Eerste Divisie	31	7	1	1	—		32	8
Dordrecht	Total		49	7	1	1	2	0	52	8
Den Bosch	2010–11	Eerste Divisie	17	10	1	2	0	0	18	12
Rennes II	2010–11	CFA	5	0	—		—		5	0
Rennes	2010–11	Ligue 1	7	0	1	0	0	0	8	0
Den Haag (loan)	2011–12	Eredivisie	23	5	2	0	0	0	25	5
FSV Frankfurt (loan)	2012–13	2. Bundesliga	32	10	2	0	—		34	10
FC St. Pauli	2013–14	2. Bundesliga	25	5	1	0	—		26	5
FC St. Pauli	2014–15	2. Bundesliga	29	4	2	0	—		31	4
FC St. Pauli	2015–16	2. Bundesliga	16	2	1	0	—		17	2
FC St. Pauli	Total		70	11	4	0	0	0	74	11
1. FC Heidenheim	2016–17	2. Bundesliga	26	5	2	1	—		28	6
1. FC Heidenheim	2017–18	2. Bundesliga	27	10	2	0	—		29	10
1. FC Heidenheim	Total		53	15	4	1	0	0	57	16
MSV Duisburg	2018–19	2. Bundesliga	22	0	3	1	—		25	1
Hansa Rostock	2019–20	3. Liga	26	5	1	0	—		27	5
Career total			304	63	19	5	2	0	325	68
