= Vincent-Louis Stenzel =

German footballer

Vincent Stenzel
Personal information
- Full name: Vincent Louis Stenzel
- Date of birth: 13 October 1996 (age 30)
- Place of birth: Lünen, Germany
- Height: 1.78 m (5 ft 10 in)
- Position: Right winger

Team information
- Current team: Rot-Weiß Oberhausen
- Number: 23

Youth career
- –2011: Borussia Dortmund
- 2011–2012: 1899 Hoffenehim
- 2012–2014: Mainz 05
- 2014: Borussia Dortmund

Senior career*
Years	Team	Apps	(Gls)
2014–2015	Borussia Dortmund II	5	(0)
2015–2016	SC Freiburg II	16	(2)
2016–2018	Hallescher FC	6	(0)
2018–2019	Carl Zeiss Jena	6	(1)
2019	Bonner SC	14	(4)
2019–	Rot-Weiß Oberhausen	8	(1)

International career
2012	Germany U17	2	(0)
- * Club domestic league appearances and goals as of 00:21, 24 January 2020 (UTC)

Vincent-Louis Stenzel (born 13 October 1996) is a German footballer who plays for Rot-Weiß Oberhausen. He plays as a right winger.

== Club career ==
Stenzel joined Borussia Dortmund in January 2014 from Mainz 05 and played for the club's reserves in the 3. Liga. He made his professional debut in the 3. Liga on 13 February 2015 against Mainz 05 II.

In August 2018, free agent Stenzel joined 3. Liga side Carl Zeiss Jena on an initial half-year contract. In December, the club announced his contract would not be renewed.

On 18 January 2019, Stenzel joined Bonner SC.
