= Wangen, Saxony-Anhalt =

Wangen
- Stadtteil of Nebra
- Interactive map of Wangen
- Location within Germany Location within Saxony-Anhalt
- Coordinates: 51°16′N 11°33′E
- Country: Germany
- State: Saxony-Anhalt
- District: Burgenlandkreis
- Town: Nebra

Area
  - Total: 6.36 km^{2} (2.46 sq mi)
- Elevation: 220 m (720 ft)

Population (2007)
  - Total: 511
  - Density: 80.3/km^{2} (208/sq mi)
- Time zone: UTC+01:00 (CET)
  - Summer (DST): UTC+02:00 (CEST)
- Postal codes: 06642
- Dialling codes: 034461

Wangen (German pronunciation: [ˈvaŋən]) is a village and a former municipality in the Burgenlandkreis district, in Saxony-Anhalt, Germany. Since 1 July 2009, it is part of the town Nebra.

The first documented mention of the village was in the Hersfeld Tithe Register in the late 9th Century.
