= Reinsdorf, Saxony-Anhalt =

Reinsdorf
- Stadtteil of Nebra
- Interactive map of Reinsdorf
- Location within Germany Location within Saxony-Anhalt
- Coordinates: 51°18′N 11°36′E
- Country: Germany
- State: Saxony-Anhalt
- District: Burgenlandkreis
- Town: Nebra

Area
  - Total: 7.57 km^{2} (2.92 sq mi)
- Elevation: 114 m (374 ft)

Population (2009-12-31)
  - Total: 551
  - Density: 72.8/km^{2} (189/sq mi)
- Time zone: UTC+01:00 (CET)
  - Summer (DST): UTC+02:00 (CEST)
- Postal codes: 06642
- Dialling codes: 034461
- Vehicle registration: BLK
- Website: Official website

Reinsdorf (German pronunciation: [ˈʁaɪnsdɔʁf]) is a village and a former municipality in the Burgenlandkreis district, in Saxony-Anhalt, Germany. Since 1 September 2010, it is part of the town Nebra.
