= Andrej Startsev =

Kazakhstani footballer (born 1994)

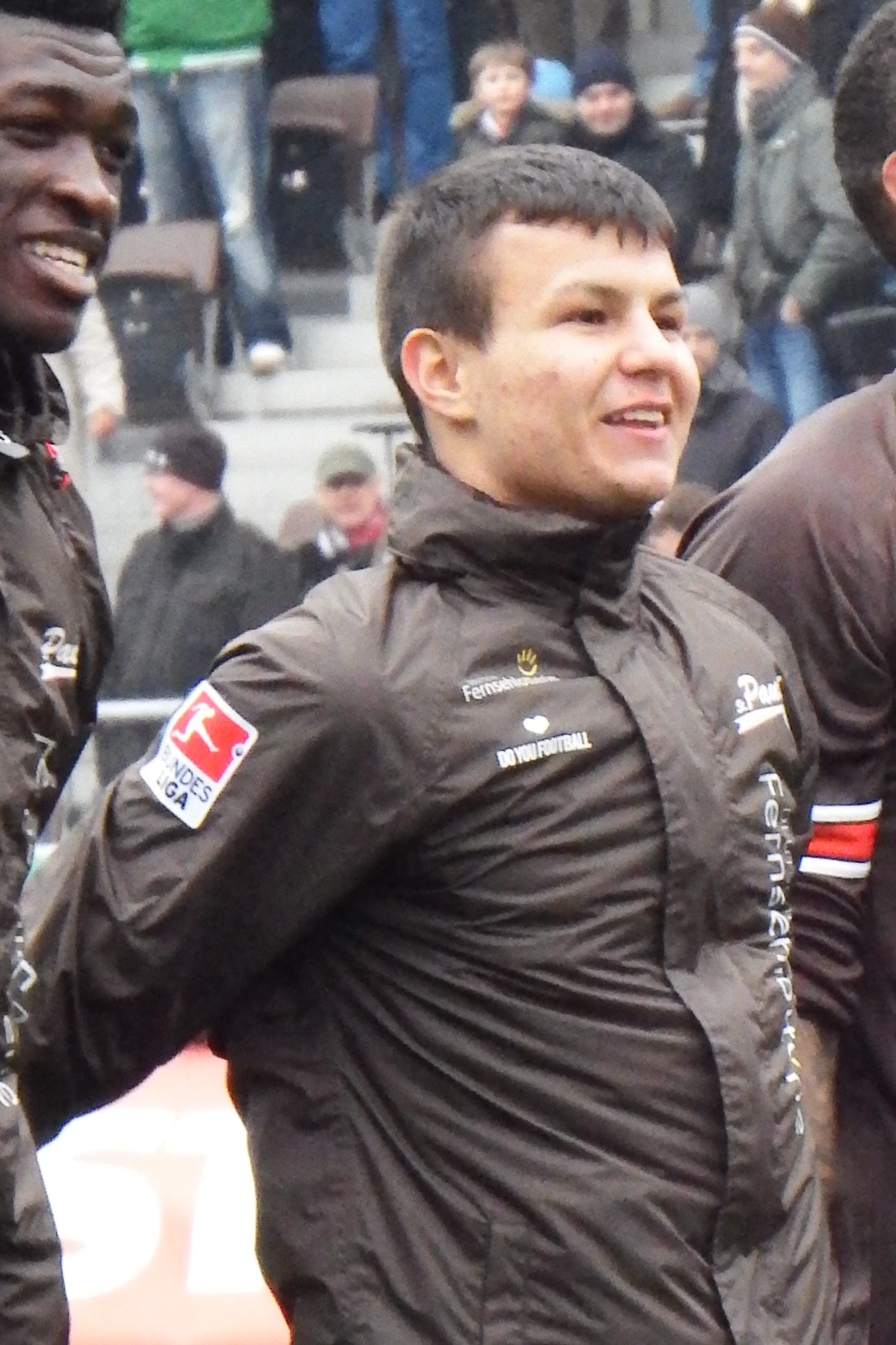
- Startsev in 2013

Personal information
- Date of birth: 7 June 1994 (age 32)
- Place of birth: Pavlodar, Kazakhstan
- Position: Right back

Team information
- Current team: FSV Zwickau
- Number: 15

Youth career
- 2010–2012: FC St. Pauli

Senior career*
Years	Team	Apps	(Gls)
2012–2016	FC St. Pauli II	89	(2)
2013–2016	FC St. Pauli	8	(0)
2016–2017	TSV Havelse	26	(2)
2017–2019	Energie Cottbus	38	(0)
2019–2020	VfB Oldenburg	6	(0)
2020–2024	Rot-Weiß Erfurt	95	(0)
2024–	FSV Zwickau	74	(2)

International career
2015	Kazakhstan U21	3	(0)
- * Club domestic league appearances and goals as of 20 November 2026

Andrej Startsev (born 7 June 1994) is a Kazakh footballer who plays as a right back for FSV Zwickau.
