= Markus Hofmeier =

German footballer

Personal information
- Full name: Markus Hofmeier
- Date of birth: 7 October 1993 (age 33)
- Place of birth: Frankfurt, Germany
- Height: 1.75 m (5 ft 9 in)
- Position: Right winger

Team information
- Current team: SF Friedrichsdorf

Youth career
- SV Darmstadt 98
- 2010–2011: FSV Frankfurt

Senior career*
Years	Team	Apps	(Gls)
2011–2013	FSV Frankfurt II	41	(6)
2011–2013	FSV Frankfurt	2	(0)
2013–2014	Wormatia Worms	2	(0)
2014–2015	1.FC Eschborn	16	(1)
2015–2017	FC Kalbach	30	(0)
2017–2018	FV Bad Vilbel	1	(0)
2019–2020	Hanauer SC	26	(2)
2020–	SF Friedrichsdorf	13	(3)
- * Club domestic league appearances and goals as of 18 February 2021

Markus Hofmeier (born 7 October 1993) is a German footballer who plays as a right winger for SF Friedrichsdorf.
