= Michael Görlitz =

German footballer

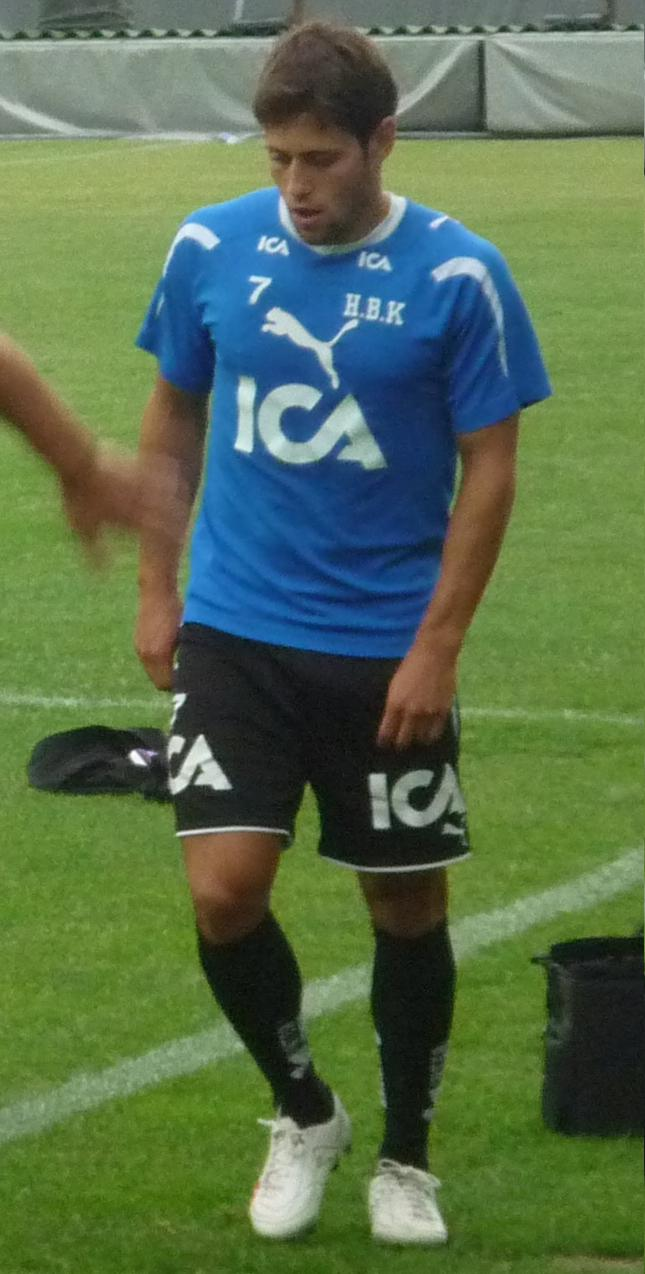
- Görlitz with Halmstad in 2010

Personal information
- Date of birth: 8 March 1987 (age 39)
- Place of birth: Nuremberg, West Germany
- Height: 1.72 m (5 ft 8 in)
- Position: Midfielder

Youth career
- SB Phönix Nürnberg
- FC Holzheim Neumarkt
- –2002: 1. FC Nürnberg
- 2002–2005: Bayern Munich

Senior career*
Years	Team	Apps	(Gls)
2005–2008	Bayern Munich II	36	(4)
2008–2011	Halmstads BK	103	(13)
2012–2014	FSV Frankfurt	69	(11)
2014–2015	FC St. Pauli	12	(0)
2015	→ FC St. Pauli II	4	(1)
2015–2017	Arminia Bielefeld	46	(3)
2018	1860 Munich	6	(0)
2018	1860 Munich II	1	(0)
2019	SC 04 Schwabach	11	(0)
2019–2022	ASV Neumarkt		

International career
2002–2003	Germany U-16	9	(1)
2003–2004	Germany U-17	12	(1)
2004–2005	Germany U-18	4	(0)
2006	Germany U-19	6	(0)
- * Club domestic league appearances and goals as of 18:36, 18 February 2021 (UTC)

Michael Görlitz (born 8 March 1987) is a German former professional footballer who played as a midfielder.

== Career ==
Görlitz began his career with SB Phönix Nürnberg and joined later FC Holzheim Neumarkt. He was then scouted from 1. FC Nürnberg and signed in 2002 with Bayern Munich.

Earlier in his career, he played for Bayern Munich II, but never played for Bayern Munich's senior team.

On 8 June 2008, he went on a week-long trial with Halmstads BK and on 23 July 2008, Halmstads BK confirmed that they signed a contract with Görlitz. He made his debut for Halmstads BK on 11 August against Helsingborgs IF, both receiving a yellow card and scoring a goal, 2–0, in the first 10 minutes, he was later chosen man of the match, the game ended 3–1.

Görlitz was selected player of the year for Halmstads BK 2008 on 22 November.

After Halmstad's relegation to Superettan, Görlitz contract expired and he left the club, to return to Germany signing for FSV Frankfurt.

During the summer break of 2014 he moved to FC St. Pauli, signing a two-year contract with the Hamburg based 2. Bundesliga club.

On 12 June it was confirmed, that Görlitz had signed a contract with Arminia Bielefeld valid from 1 July 2015. In June 2017, after two years with Bielefeld, his expiring contract wasn not extended and he left the club.

In January 2018, Görlitz joined fourth-tier side 1860 Munich signing a contract until the end of the season with the option of an extension.

== International ==
Görlitz has played 31 international games for Germany between U16 and U19 level.

== Career statistics ==
As of 26 April 2018

Appearances and goals by club, season and competition
Club	Season	League			Cup		Total	
Club	Season	Division	Apps	Goals	Apps	Goals	Apps	Goals
Bayern Munich II	2005–06	Regionalliga Süd	10	1	—		10	1
Bayern Munich II	2006–07	Regionalliga Süd	10	1	—		10	1
Bayern Munich II	2007–08	Regionalliga Süd	16	2	—		16	2
Bayern Munich II	Total		36	4	—		36	4
Halmstads BK	2008	Allsvenskan	13	3			13	3
Halmstads BK	2009	Allsvenskan	30	3			30	3
Halmstads BK	2010	Allsvenskan	30	3			30	3
Halmstads BK	2011	Allsvenskan	30	4			30	4
Halmstads BK	Total		103	13			103	13
FSV Frankfurt	2011–12	2. Bundesliga	14	4	0	0	14	4
FSV Frankfurt	2012–13	2. Bundesliga	34	6	2	0	36	6
FSV Frankfurt	2013–14	2. Bundesliga	34	3	2	0	36	3
FSV Frankfurt	Total		82	13	4	0	86	13
FC St. Pauli	2014–15	2. Bundesliga	12	0	0	0	12	0
FC St. Pauli II	2014–15	Regionalliga Nord	4	1	—		4	1
Arminia Bielefeld II	2015–16	Oberliga Westfalen	2	0	—		2	0
Arminia Bielefeld	2015–16	2. Bundesliga	23	3	0	0	23	3
Arminia Bielefeld	2016–17	2. Bundesliga	23	0	4	0	27	0
Arminia Bielefeld	Total		46	3	4	0	50	3
1860 Munich	2017–18	Regionalliga Bayern	4	0	—		4	0
1860 Munich II	2017–18	Bayernliga Süd	1	0	—		1	0
Career total			290	34	8	0	298	34

== Honours ==
Bayern Munich II

- IFA Shield: 2005

Individual

- Halmstads BK Player of the year: 2008, 2009
