= Moïse Bambara =

Burkinabé footballer

Personal information
- Full name: Moïse Bambara
- Date of birth: 10 November 1984 (age 41)
- Place of birth: Ouagadougou, Burkina Faso
- Height: 1.84 m (6 ft 0 in)
- Positions: Midfielder; winger

Youth career
- 2001–2003: SpVgg Mitterdorf

Senior career*
Years	Team	Apps	(Gls)
2003–2004	ASV Cham		
2004–2006	1. FC Bad Kötzting	34	(1)
2006–2009	Jahn Regensburg	97	(8)
2009–2012	FC Ingolstadt	84	(2)
2012–2013	FSV Frankfurt	27	(2)

International career
2011	Burkina Faso	1	(0)
- * Club domestic league appearances and goals as of 22:09, 7 September 2013 (UTC)

Moïse Bambara (born 10 November 1984 in Ouagadougou) is a Burkinabé footballer.

== Career ==
Bambara began his career with SpVgg Mitterdorf and moved later to ASV Cham. He joined in 2004 1. FC Bad Kötzting and played there two years before transferring to SSV Jahn Regensburg in July 2006. While with Jahn Regensburg, Bambara appeared in 97 league matches and scored eight goals. On 7 June 2009, Bambara left Regensburg and signed with FC Ingolstadt 04 a two-year contract.

During March 2011 it was reported that Portland Timbers of Major League Soccer were interested in signing Bambara.

On 23 July 2012, Bambara signed a one-year contract with German 2. Bundesliga side FSV Frankfurt.
