= Sören Gonther =

German footballer

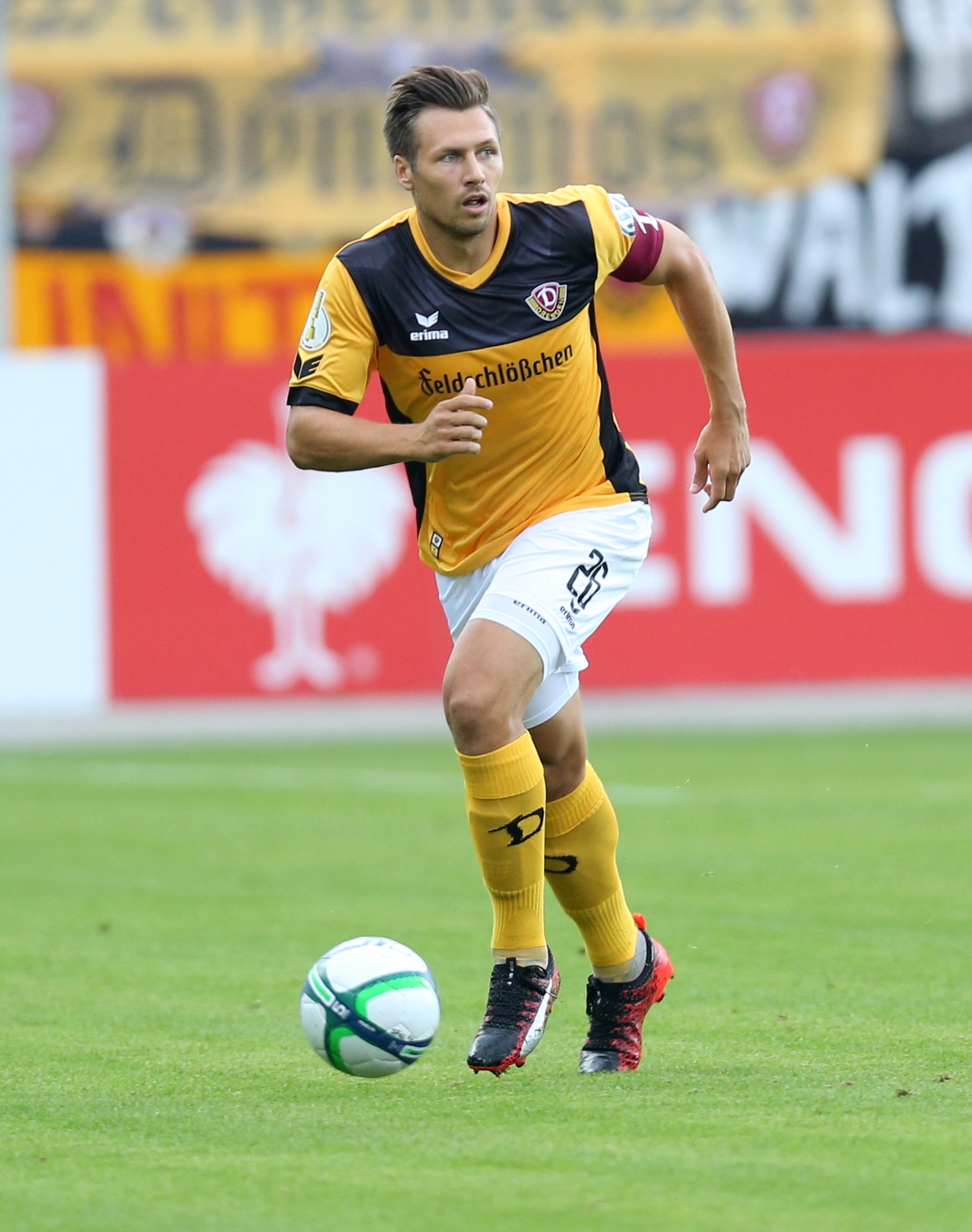
- Gonther with Dynamo Dresden in 2017

Personal information
- Date of birth: 15 December 1986 (age 39)
- Place of birth: Schrecksbach, West Germany
- Height: 1.86 m (6 ft 1 in)
- Position: Defender

Youth career
- 1990–1998: VfB Schrecksbach
- 1998–2001: ESV Jahn Treysa
- 2001–2003: KSV Hessen Kassel

Senior career*
Years	Team	Apps	(Gls)
2003–2007	KSV Baunatal		
2007–2012	SC Paderborn	113	(5)
2012–2017	FC St. Pauli	89	(3)
2013	→ FC St. Pauli II	2	(0)
2017–2019	Dynamo Dresden	21	(0)
2019–2022	Erzgebirge Aue	93	(4)
- * Club domestic league appearances and goals as of 15 May 2022

Sören Gonther (born 15 December 1986) is a German professional footballer who plays as a defender.

== Career ==
Gonther played in the youth for Jahn Treysa, VfB Schrecksbach and KSV Hessen Kassel. From 2004 to 2007 he played at KSV Baunatal in the Oberliga Hessen.

=== SC Paderborn ===
For the 2007–08 season Gonther transferred to 2. Bundesliga side SC Paderborn 07. On 3 February 2008, he completed his first professional match in the game against Kickers Offenbach. After that, the Gonther he into a regular starter. The relegation at the end of the season was followed by an immediate promotion the following year. In the following two years, Gonther was a regular starter in the defense of the Paderborn. In February 2012, he suffered cruciate ligament injury and missed the rest of the season.

=== FC St. Pauli ===
Despite Gonthers injury, FC St. Pauli signed him on 1 July 2012. He signed a two-year contract until 30 June 2014. In preparation for the new season, he was injured for most of the season due to his cruciate ligament injury suffered at Paderborn. On 12 May 2013, the penultimate round of the 2012–13 season, he made his debut for St.Pauli in at 5–1 win over newly promoted Bundesliga Eintracht Braunschweig.

In the 2013–14 season was Gonther was one of the linchpins in central defense and was one of the top performers at FC St. Pauli. Before the season 2014–15 he was appointed as successor to Fabian Boll and made captain of the club. During the 2015–16 season, Gonther led FC St. Pauli to a 4th-place finish in 2.Bundesliga and narrowly missed out on Promotion to Bundesliga. His impressive form for the club saw him linked with rivals Karlsruher SC and TSV 1860 Munich during the summer of 2016, however he remained at FC St. Pauli.

=== Dynamo Dresden ===
In May 2017, Dynamo Dresden announced the signing of Gonther on a three-year deal.

=== Erzgebirge Aue ===
In June 2019, Gonther joined Erzgebirge Aue on a two-year deal.
