= Florian Kringe =

German footballer (born 1982)

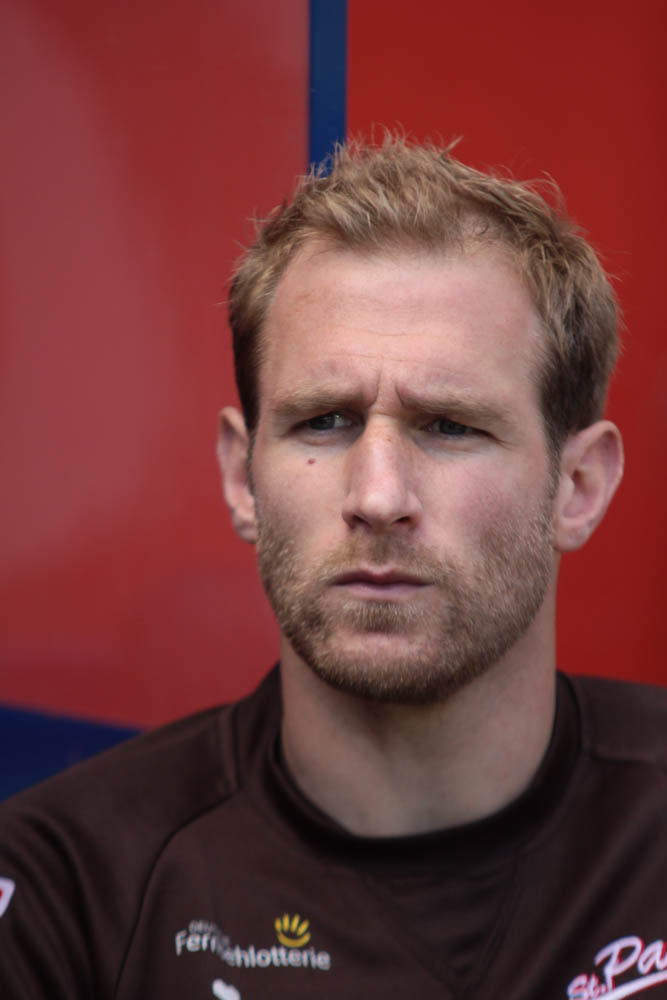
- Kringe with FC St. Pauli in 2013

Personal information
- Full name: Florian Kringe
- Date of birth: 18 August 1982 (age 44)
- Place of birth: Siegen, West Germany
- Height: 1.87 m (6 ft 2 in)
- Position: Midfielder

Youth career
- –1991: TSV Weißtal
- 1991–1994: Sportfreunde Siegen
- 1994–2001: Borussia Dortmund

Senior career*
| Years | Team | Apps | (Gls) |
| 2000–2011 | Borussia Dortmund II | 56 | (16) |
| 2001–2012 | Borussia Dortmund | 151 | (17) |
| 2002–2004 | → 1. FC Köln (loan) | 62 | (8) |
| 2003 | → 1. FC Köln II (loan) | 1 | (0) |
| 2009–2010 | → Hertha BSC (loan) | 12 | (0) |
| 2009–2010 | → Hertha BSC II (loan) | 1 | (0) |
| 2012–2015 | FC St. Pauli | 56 | (6) |
| Total | | 339 | (47) |

International career
| 2002–2005 | Germany B | 6 | (0) |
| 2003 | Germany U21 | 4 | (0) |
Medal record
Borussia Dortmund
| Winner | Bundesliga | 2002 |
| Winner | Bundesliga | 2011 |
| Winner | Bundesliga | 2012 |
| Winner | DFB-Pokal | 2012 |
- * Club domestic league appearances and goals

Florian Kringe (born 18 August 1982) is a German former professional footballer who played as a midfielder.

== Career ==
Born in Siegen, Kringe started his career with TSV Weißtal and Sportfreunde Siegen. From 1994 to 2002 he played for Borussia Dortmund at various levels, before joining 1. FC Köln on loan for two years. In 2004, he rejoined his parent club and became a regular in the first team for a number of years. On 31 August 2009, he joined Hertha BSC on a one-year loan, before returning to BVB again.

He left Borussia Dortmund at the end of the 2011–12 season and signed a one-year contract with FC St. Pauli on 24 July 2012.

== Honours ==
Borussia Dortmund

- Bundesliga: 2001–02, 2010–11, 2011–12
- DFB-Pokal: 2011–12
- UEFA Cup Runners Up: 2002
