= Robert Schick =

German footballer

Personal information
- Date of birth: 26 August 1993 (age 33)
- Place of birth: Bad Soden, Germany
- Height: 1.88 m (6 ft 2 in)
- Position: Left-back

Team information
- Current team: Bayern Alzenau
- Number: 5

Youth career
- 1998–2002: SV Hofheim 09
- 2002–2006: Germania Schwanheim
- 2006–2008: FSV Mainz 05
- 2008–2009: SV Wehen Wiesbaden
- 2009–2011: SV Darmstadt 98
- 2011–2012: Karlsruher SC

Senior career*
Years	Team	Apps	(Gls)
2012–2013	FSV Frankfurt II	30	(0)
2012–2013	FSV Frankfurt	0	(0)
2013–2015	Hallescher FC	26	(1)
2015	VfR Aalen	0	(0)
2015–2017	VfL Wolfsburg II	27	(0)
2017–2019	FSV Frankfurt	59	(11)
2019–	Bayern Alzenau	2	(2)
- * Club domestic league appearances and goals as of 21:47, 4 August 2019 (UTC)

Robert Schick (born 26 August 1993) is a German footballer who plays as a left-back for FC Bayern Alzenau.

== Career ==
Schick played as a youth for several clubs in south-western Germany, before signing his first professional contract with FSV Frankfurt in 2012. He joined 3. Liga club Hallescher FC on loan for the 2013–14 season, and made his debut in August 2013, as a substitute for Tony Schmidt in a 2–0 win over SV Elversberg. After a year on loan at Halle, he signed for the club permanently.

In January 2015 his contract with Halle was dissolved and he moved to 2. Bundesliga side VfR Aalen.
