= Sebastian Schachten =

German footballer (born 1984)

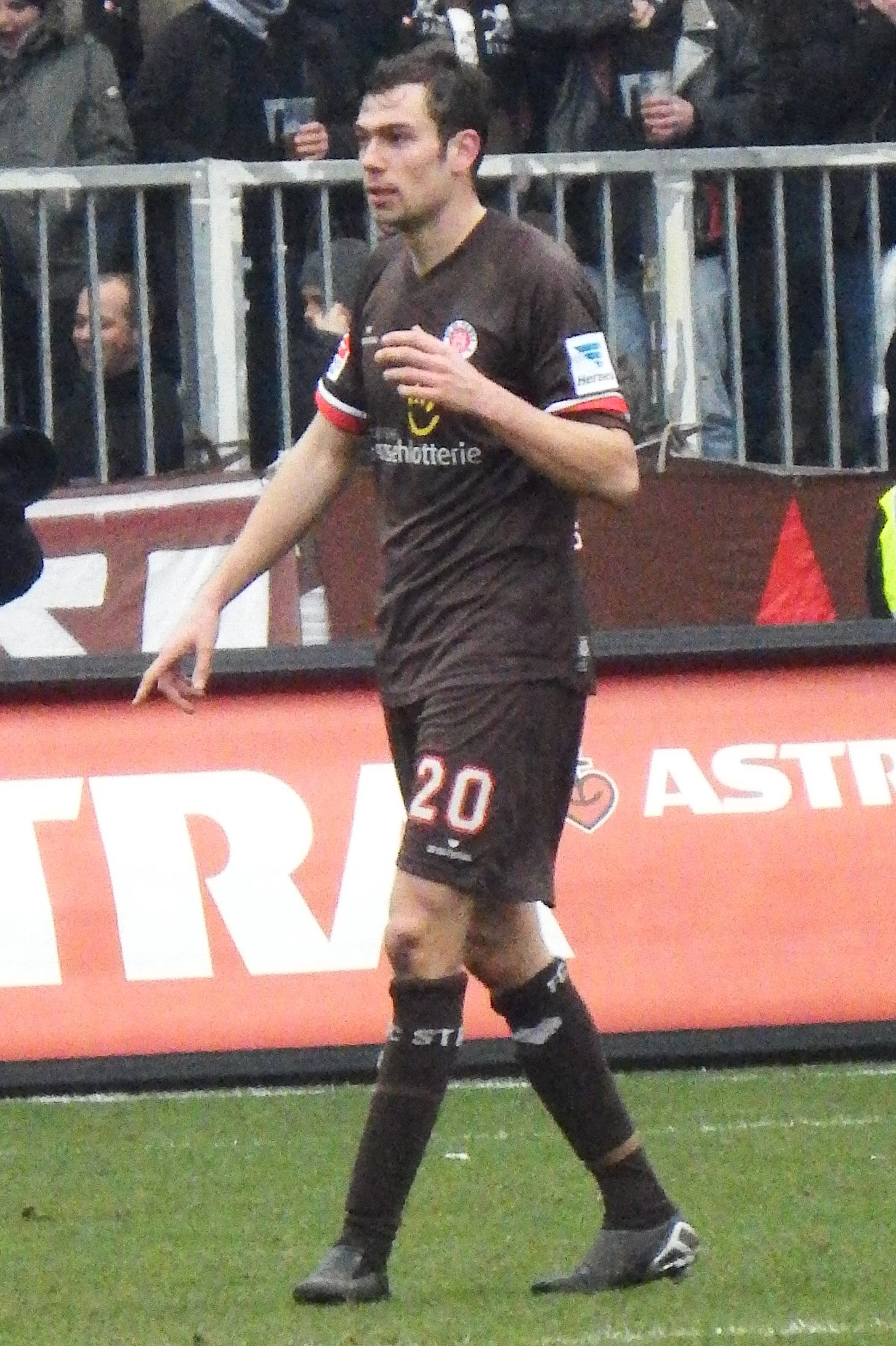
- Schachten playing for St. Pauli in 2013

Personal information
- Date of birth: 6 November 1984 (age 42)
- Place of birth: Bad Karlshafen, West Germany
- Height: 1.90 m (6 ft 3 in)
- Position: Defender

Youth career
- 1989–1997: FC Weser
- 1997–1998: SpVgg Einbeck
- 1998–2000: SVG Göttingen 07
- 2000–2004: SCW Göttingen

Senior career*
Years	Team	Apps	(Gls)
2004–2005	SC Paderborn	18	(2)
2005–2007	Werder Bremen II	60	(6)
2007–2011	Borussia Mönchengladbach II	10	(2)
2007–2011	Borussia Mönchengladbach	16	(0)
2009–2010	→ SC Paderborn (loan)	30	(1)
2011–2015	FC St. Pauli	93	(10)
2015–2016	FC Luzern	19	(2)
2016–2017	FSV Frankfurt	19	(0)
Total		265	(23)
- * Club domestic league appearances and goals

Sebastian Schachten (born 6 November 1984) is a German former professional footballer who played as a defender. He played Bundesliga football with Borussia Mönchengladbach, and also played in Germany with SC Paderborn, Werder Bremen II, FC St. Pauli and FSV Frankfurt, and in Switzerland with FC Luzern.

== Playing career ==
Schachten was born in Bad Karlshafen on 6 November 1984. He lived in Tallahassee, Florida in the United States for a year around the age of 16. He played youth football with FC Weser, SpVgg Einbeck, SVG Göttingen 07 and SCW Göttingen. He played with SC Paderborn in the 2004–05 season, and with Werder Bremen II for the 2005–06 and 2006–07 seasons, both in the Regionalliga Nord. He was part of the Paderborn team that earned promotion to the 2. Bundesliga in 2005.

In June 2007, Schachten moved to Borussia Mönchengladbach on a four-year contract for an undisclosed fee. A torn muscle limited him to just two appearances for the club in his debut season, and he underwent surgery around the start of the 2008–09 season for a knee injury. He played just once for the first team during the 2008–09 season. In June 2009, Schachten returned to SC Paderborn on loan. He scored once in 30 matches over the 2009–10 season and returned to Gladbach at the end of the season. In October 2010, Schachten was given his first start for the club as a left-back in a 1–1 draw with VfL Wolfsburg. He made 13 appearances, 7 of which as starts, over the 2010–11 season.

In summer 2011, following the expiry of his contract with Gladbach, he signed for FC St. Pauli on a two-year contract with the option of a further year. In February 2013, his contract was extended until summer 2015. He was released by the club at the end of his contract in summer 2015, having scored 10 goals in 97 matches in all competitions.

After his expiring contract with 2. Bundesliga side FC St. Pauli had not been renewed, Schachten moved to Swiss club FC Luzern on a free transfer in summer 2015. He signed a two-year contract until 2017. He made 19 appearances in the Swiss Super League and scored two goals.

Schachten joined FSV Frankfurt on a two-year contract in summer 2016. He played 19 times in the 3. Liga as FSV Frankfurt finished bottom and were relegated. His contract was not valid following FSV Frankfurt's relegation and so, despite the contract being valid until 2018, he became a free agent in summer 2017.

== After football ==
Schachten became sporting director at VfB Oldenburg in 2021 and his contract in this role was extended in December 2023. After a spell as interim managing director of VfB Oldenburg alongside Katja Schade, Schachten and Schade were given the role on a permanent basis in October 2025.
