= 2019–20 FC St. Pauli season =

FC St. Pauli
2019–20 season
- President: Oke Göttlich
- Manager: Jos Luhukay
- Stadium: Millerntor-Stadion
- 2. Bundesliga: 14th
- DFB-Pokal: Second round
- Top goalscorer: League: Dimitrios Diamantakos; Henk Veerman (11 goals each); All: Dimitrios Diamantakos (12 goals)
Home colours	Away colours	Third colours
- All statistics correct as of 30 June 2020.

The 2019–20 FC St. Pauli season is the 109th season in the football club's history and 9th consecutive season in the second division of German football, the 2. Bundesliga and 27th overall. In addition to the domestic league, FC St. Pauli also are participating in this season's edition of the domestic cup, the DFB-Pokal. This is the 57th season for FC St. Pauli in the Millerntor-Stadion, located in St. Pauli, Hamburg, Germany. The season covers a period from 1 July 2019 to 30 June 2020.

== Players ==
=== Squad information ===
As of 29 January 2020

Note: Flags indicate national team as defined under FIFA eligibility rules; some limited exceptions apply. Players may hold more than one non-FIFA nationality.

No.	Pos.	Nation	Player
2	DF	POL	Jakub Bednarczyk
3	DF	NOR	Leo Skiri Østigård (on loan from Brighton & Hove Albion)
4	DF	GER	Philipp Ziereis
5	MF	GER	Marvin Knoll
6	DF	GER	Christopher Avevor (captain)
7	MF	GER	Kevin Lankford
8	DF	GER	Marc Hornschuh
9	FW	SWE	Viktor Gyökeres (on loan from Brighton & Hove Albion)
10	MF	GER	Christopher Buchtmann
12	MF	JPN	Ryo Miyaichi
15	DF	GER	Daniel Buballa (vice-captain)
17	DF	ENG	Matt Penney (on loan from Sheffield Wednesday)
18	FW	GRE	Dimitrios Diamantakos
19	DF	GER	Luca-Milan Zander
20	DF	KOR	Park Yi-young
21	DF	WAL	James Lawrence (on loan from Anderlecht)

No.	Pos.	Nation	Player
23	MF	GER	Johannes Flum
24	FW	UKR	Borys Tashchy
25	FW	NED	Henk Veerman
26	MF	GER	Rico Benatelli
27	DF	GER	Jan-Philipp Kalla (vice-captain)
28	MF	POL	Waldemar Sobota
30	GK	GER	Robin Himmelmann
31	MF	GER	Ersin Zehir
32	MF	GER	Christian Conteh
33	GK	GER	Svend Brodersen
36	MF	GER	Luis Coordes
37	MF	GER	Finn Ole Becker
38	DF	GER	Florian Carstens
40	GK	GER	Korbinian Müller
43	DF	SWE	Sebastian Ohlsson

=== Transfers ===
==== Summer ====
In:

No.	Pos.	Nation	Player
3	DF	NOR	Leo Skiri Østigård (on loan from Brighton & Hove Albion)
9	FW	SWE	Viktor Gyökeres (on loan from Brighton & Hove Albion)
17	DF	ENG	Matt Penney (on loan from Sheffield Wednesday)
19	DF	GER	Luca-Milan Zander (from Werder Bremen, previously on loan)
21	DF	WAL	James Lawrence (on loan from Anderlecht)
24	FW	UKR	Borys Tashchy (from MSV Duisburg)
26	MF	GER	Rico Benatelli (from Dynamo Dresden)
43	DF	SWE	Sebastian Ohlsson (from IFK Göteborg)
44	MF	MLI	Youba Diarra (on loan from Red Bull Salzburg)

Out:

No.	Pos.	Nation	Player
1	GK	GER	Korbinian Müller (retired)
8	MF	GER	Jeremy Dudziak (to Hamburger SV)
9	FW	GER	Alexander Meier (released)
11	FW	TUN	Sami Allagui (to Royal Excel Mouscron)
20	MF	GER	Richard Neudecker (to VVV-Venlo)
22	DF	NED	Justin Hoogma (loan return to 1899 Hoffenheim)
29	FW	GER	Jan-Marc Schneider (to Jahn Regensburg)
34	MF	GER	Jakob Münzner (to FC St. Pauli II)
35	DF	GER	Brian Koglin (to 1. FC Magdeburg)
—	MF	GER	Maurice Litka (to Preußen Münster, previously on loan at KFC Uerdingen 05)

==== Winter ====
In:

No.	Pos.	Nation	Player
22	MF	GER	Maximilian Franzke (from FC Bayern Munich II)
40	GK	GER	Korbinian Müller (free agent)

Out:

No.	Pos.	Nation	Player
13	MF	GER	Niklas Hoffmann (to Würzburger Kickers)
14	MF	NOR	Mats Møller Dæhli (to KRC Genk)
22	FW	TUR	Cenk Şahin (to Kayserispor)
44	MF	MLI	Youba Diarra (loan return to Red Bull Salzburg)

== Matches ==
=== Legend ===
Win Draw Loss

=== Friendly matches ===
29 June 2019 Friendly	Stadtauswahl Celle	0–11	FC St. Pauli	Celle
15:00		Report	Diamantakos 7'; Benatelli 13'; Sobota 34', 38'; Lankford 36', 40'; Buchtmann 51', 86' (pen.); Conteh 56'; Tashchy 59'; Wieckhoff 71'	Stadium: Günther-Volker-Stadion

30 June 2019 Friendly	FC Teutonia 05	3–3	FC St. Pauli	Winsen
15:00	Krottke 32'; Avevor 49' (o.g.); Müller 80'	Report	Buchtmann 45+1'; Diamantakos 47', 50' (pen.)	Stadium: Sportanlage Höllenberg

7 July 2019 Friendly	FC Ingolstadt 04	0–3	FC St. Pauli	Hippach, Austria
16:00		Report	Zehir 53'; Diamantakos 61'; Loubongo-M'Boungou 87'	Stadium: Lindenstadion Hippach

10 July 2019 Friendly	WSG Swarovski Tirol	3–2	FC St. Pauli	Hippach, Austria
16:00	Dedić 17', 36'; Pranter (penalty missed) 25'; Gugganig 39'	Report	Şahin 18'; Buchtmann 55'	Stadium: Lindenstadion Hippach

16 July 2019 Friendly	SC Weiche Flensburg 08	0–1	FC St. Pauli	Flensburg
12:00		Report	Diamantakos 7'	Stadium: Manfred-Werner-Stadion

20 July 2019 Friendly	SC Heerenveen	1–1	FC St. Pauli	Heerenveen, Netherlands
15:00	Faik 3'	Report	Diamantakos 63' (pen.)	Stadium: Abe Lenstra Stadion

4 September 2019 Friendly	FC St. Pauli	0–2	AaB	Norderstedt
12:00		Report	Kusk 32'; Fossum 64'	Stadium: Edmund-Plambeck-Stadion; Referee: Patrick Ittrich (Hamburg)

11 October 2019 Friendly	FC St. Pauli	1–0	Werder Bremen	Hamburg
18:30	Diarra 52'	Report		Stadium: Millerntor-Stadion; Attendance: 12,679; Referee: Florian Heft (Neuenkirchen-Vörden)

16 January 2020 Friendly	SV Wehen Wiesbaden	2–5	FC St. Pauli	Oliva, Spain
15:00	Tietz 76' (pen.); Knöll 96'	Report	Tashchy 40'; Veerman 69', 105'; Buchtmann 89'; Miyaichi 112'	Stadium: Oliva Nova Golf & Beach Resort Campo 1
Note: The game was played in four quarters of 30 minutes each.

18 January 2020 Friendly	Arminia Bielefeld	4–3	FC St. Pauli	Oliva, Spain
15:00	Hartherz 29'; Klos 47'; Staude 64', 120'	Report	Gyökeres 58'; Miyaichi 68', 81'	Stadium: Oliva Nova Golf & Beach Resort Campo 1
Note: The game was played in two halves of 60 minutes each.

=== 2. Bundesliga ===
==== League table ====
Pos	Team	Pld	W	D	L	GF	GA	GD	Pts	Promotion, qualification or relegation
12	Jahn Regensburg	34	11	10	13	50	56	−6	43	
13	VfL Osnabrück	34	9	13	12	46	48	−2	40	
14	FC St. Pauli	34	9	12	13	41	50	−9	39	
15	Karlsruher SC	34	8	13	13	45	56	−11	37	
16	1. FC Nürnberg (O)	34	8	13	13	45	58	−13	37	Qualification for relegation play-offs

Source: DFB
Rules for classification: 1) Points; 2) Goal difference; 3) Goals scored; 4) Head-to-head points; 5) Head-to-head goal difference; 6) Head-to-head away goals scored; 7) Away goals scored; 8) Play-off.
(O) Play-off winners

==== Results summary ====
Overall								Home						Away					
Pld	W	D	L	GF	GA	GD	Pts	W	D	L	GF	GA	GD	W	D	L	GF	GA	GD
34	9	12	13	41	50	−9	39	8	5	3	24	14	+10	1	7	10	17	36	−19

Last updated: 28 June 2020.
Source: Kicker

==== Results by round ====
Round	1	2	3	4	5	6	7	8	9	10	11	12	13	14	15	16	17	18	19	20	21	22	23	24	25	26	27	28	29	30	31	32	33	34
Ground	A	H	A	H	A	H	A	H	A	H	A	H	H	A	H	A	H	H	A	H	A	H	A	H	A	H	A	H	A	A	H	A	H	A
Result	D	L	L	W	D	W	D	W	D	L	L	D	D	L	L	L	W	W	L	D	L	D	W	W	D	W	L	D	D	L	W	L	D	D
Position	12	15	17	14	13	10	10	6	5	8	12	9	11	13	15	15	15	11	12	12	15	14	12	10	11	9	11	12	13	14	13	13	14	14

Updated to match(es) played on 28 June 2020. Source: Kicker
A = Away; H = Home; W = Win; D = Draw; L = Loss

==== Results ====
29 July 2019 1	Arminia Bielefeld	1–1	FC St. Pauli	Bielefeld
20:30 CEST	Behrendt (yellow card) 56'; Prietl (yellow card) 69', (goal) 90'	FCSP Report; Kicker Report	Conteh 32'; Miyaichi (yellow card) 79'; Hoffmann (yellow card) 90+3'	Stadium: Bielefelder Alm; Attendance: 23,857; Referee: Bastian Dankert (Rostock)

2 August 2019 2	FC St. Pauli	1–3	Greuther Fürth	Hamburg
20:30 CEST	Diamantakos 45'	FCSP Report; Kicker Report	Keita-Ruel 17', 35'; Wittek (yellow card) 50'; Green 70'	Stadium: Millerntor-Stadion; Attendance: 29,546; Referee: Sven Jablonski (Bremen)

17 August 2019 3	VfB Stuttgart	2–1	FC St. Pauli	Stuttgart
13:00 CEST	Kempf 60'; González 90'	FCSP Report; Kicker Report	Møller Dæhli 18'; Carstens (yellow card) 67'; Sobota (yellow card) 87'	Stadium: Mercedes-Benz Arena; Attendance: 53,315; Referee: Guido Winkmann (Kerken)

26 August 2019 4	FC St. Pauli	2–1	Holstein Kiel	Hamburg
20:30 CEST	Kalla (yellow card) 27'; Miyaichi (yellow card) 34'; Lawrence 49'; Penney (yellow card) 61' (yellow-red card) 90+3'; Conteh 66'	FCSP Report; Kicker Report	Ignjovski (yellow card) 68'; Baku 81'; Wahl (yellow card) 90+3'; Van den Bergh (yellow card) 90+5'	Stadium: Millerntor-Stadion; Attendance: 29,546; Referee: Markus Schmidt (Stuttgart)

31 August 2019 5	Dynamo Dresden	3–3	FC St. Pauli	Dresden
13:00 CEST	Burnić (yellow card) 23'; Nikolaou 40', 54', (red card) 84'; Koné 85'	FCSP Report; Kicker Report	Diamankatos 13', 29'; Sobota 16'; Møller Dæhli (yellow card) 45+2'; Carstens (yellow card) 76'	Stadium: Rudolf-Harbig-Stadion; Attendance: 29,953; Referee: Benjamin Cortus (Röthenbach an der Pegnitz)

16 September 2019 6	FC St. Pauli	2–0	Hamburger SV	Hamburg
20:30 CEST	Diamantakos 18', (yellow card) 18'; Van Drongelen 62' (o.g.); Ohlsson (yellow card) 71'	FCSP Report; Kicker Report	Leibold (yellow card) 33'; Jung (yellow card) 61'	Stadium: Millerntor-Stadion; Attendance: 29,546; Referee: Sven Jablonski (Bremen)

22 September 2019 7	VfL Osnabrück	1–1	FC St. Pauli	Osnabrück
13:30 CEST	Wolze 13'; Polzin (yellow card) 71'; Taffertshofer (yellow card) 77'; Amenyido (yellow card) 83'	FCSP Report; Kicker Report	Miyaichi (yellow card) 16', (goal) 22'; Diarra (yellow card) 67' (yellow-red card) 84'; Østigård (yellow card) 82'	Stadium: Stadion an der Bremer Brücke; Attendance: 15,976; Referee: Martin Petersen (Stuttgart)

29 September 2019 8	FC St. Pauli	2–0	SV Sandhausen	Hamburg
13:30 CEST	Becker 8'; Østigård (yellow card) 27'; Gyökeres 45+1'; Møller Dæhli (yellow card) 82'	FCSP Report; Kicker Report	Paqarada (yellow card) 30'	Stadium: Millerntor-Stadion; Attendance: 29,546; Referee: Matthias Jöllenbeck (Freiburg im Breisgau)

6 October 2019 9	1. FC Nürnberg	1–1	FC St. Pauli	Nuremberg
13:30 CEST	Geis (yellow card) 45'; Behrens 51'; Hack (yellow card) 73'; Frey (yellow card) 78'	FCSP Report; Kicker Report	Gyökeres 23'; Ohlsson (yellow card) 39'	Stadium: Max-Morlock-Stadion; Attendance: 32,117; Referee: Lasse Koslowski (Berlin)

19 October 2019 10	FC St. Pauli	0–1	Darmstadt 98	Hamburg
13:00 CEST	Lawrence (yellow card) 28'; Becker (yellow card) 76'	FCSP Report; Kicker Report	Pálsson (yellow card) 19', (goal) 80'; Kempe (yellow card) 90'	Stadium: Millerntor-Stadion; Attendance: 29,412; Referee: Tobias Reichel (Stuttgart)

27 October 2019 11	1. FC Heidenheim	1–0	FC St. Pauli	Heidenheim an der Brenz
13:30 CET	Theuerkauf 59'	FCSP Report; Kicker Report	Diarra (yellow card) 28'; Tashchy (yellow card) 56'	Stadium: Voith-Arena; Attendance: 13,500; Referee: Martin Thomsen (Kleve)

2 November 2019 12	FC St. Pauli	2–2	Karlsruher SC	Hamburg
13:00 CET	Diamantakos 50' (pen.), 61' (pen.); Flum (yellow card) 63'; Buballa (yellow card) 90+5'	FCSP Report; Kicker Report	Kobald (yellow card) 57'; Fröde (yellow card) 60'; Lorenz 85', (yellow card) 90+2'; Pourié 90+1'	Stadium: Millerntor-Stadion; Attendance: 29,546; Referee: Christof Günsch (Marburg)

8 November 2019 13	FC St. Pauli	1–1	VfL Bochum	Hamburg
18:30 CET	Sobota 10'; Ziereis (yellow card) 72'	FCSP Report; Kicker Report	Zoller 5'; Soares (yellow card) 50'; Blum (yellow card) 85'	Stadium: Millerntor-Stadion; Attendance: 29,546; Referee: Florian Badstübner (Windsbach)

22 November 2019 14	Erzgebirge Aue	3–1	FC St. Pauli	Aue
18:30 CET	Krüger 14'; Nazarov 24' (pen.); Riese (yellow card) 55'; Testroet 62'; Fandrich (yellow card) 87'	FCSP Report; Kicker Report	Ohlsson (yellow card) 33'; Veerman 56'	Stadium: Erzgebirgsstadion; Attendance: 14,000; Referee: Markus Schmidt (Stuttgart)

30 November 2019 15	FC St. Pauli	0–1	Hannover 96	Hamburg
13:00 CET	Zander (yellow card) 88'	FCSP Report; Kicker Report	Maina 7'; Anton (yellow card) 24'; Haraguchi (yellow card) 55'; Albornoz (yellow card) 75'	Stadium: Millerntor-Stadion; Attendance: 29,546; Referee: Robert Hartmann (Wangen im Allgäu)

8 December 2019 16	Jahn Regensburg	1–0	FC St. Pauli	Regensburg
13:30 CET	Grüttner 42'; Saller (yellow card) 52'; Gimber (yellow card) 85'	FCSP Report; Kicker Report	Ziereis (yellow card) 56' (yellow-red card) 69'; Sobota (yellow card) 90+3'	Stadium: Arena Regensburg; Attendance: 15,026; Referee: Sven Waschitzki (Essen)

14 December 2019 17	FC St. Pauli	3–1	SV Wehen Wiesbaden	Hamburg
13:00 CET	Gyökeres 22', 90+1'; Veerman 86'; Kuyucu (yellow card) 89'	FCSP Report; Kicker Report	Titsch-Rivero (yellow card) 38'; Schäffler (yellow card) 49', (goal) 70'	Stadium: Millerntor-Stadion; Attendance: 29,211; Referee: Robert Kempter (Stockach)

21 December 2019 18	FC St. Pauli	3–0	Arminia Bielefeld	Hamburg
13:00 CET	Veerman 3', 25'; Gyökeres 54'; Zander (yellow card) 60'	FCSP Report; Kicker Report		Stadium: Millerntor-Stadion; Attendance: 29,546; Referee: Manuel Gräfe (Berlin)

28 January 2020 19	Greuther Fürth	3–0	FC St. Pauli	Fürth
20:30 CET	Green (yellow card) 27'; Hrgota 43'; Leweling 86'; Keita-Ruel 90+2'	FCSP Report; Kicker Report	Gyökeres (yellow card) 38'	Stadium: Sportpark Ronhof Thomas Sommer; Attendance: 9,220; Referee: Christof Günsch (Marburg)

1 February 2020 20	FC St. Pauli	1–1	VfB Stuttgart	Hamburg
13:00 CET	Flum (yellow card) 39'; Veerman 56'	FCSP Report; Kicker Report	Gómez 81'; Mangala (yellow card) 88'	Stadium: Millerntor-Stadion; Attendance: 29,546; Referee: Felix Brych (Munich)

10 February 2020 21	Holstein Kiel	2–1	FC St. Pauli	Kiel
20:30 CET	Mühling (yellow card) 23'; Özcan 30'; Serra 69'	FCSP Report; Kicker Report	Østigård (yellow card) 26'; Veerman 52', (penalty missed) 90'+5; Flum (yellow card) 55'	Stadium: Holstein-Stadion; Attendance: 14,129; Referee: Arne Aarnink (Nordhorn)

14 February 2020 22	FC St. Pauli	0–0	Dynamo Dresden	Hamburg
18:30 CET	Sobota (yellow card) 57'; Benatelli (yellow card) 77'	FCSP Report; Kicker Report	Klingenburg (yellow card) 57'; Petrák (yellow card) 62'; C. Löwe (yellow card) 86'	Stadium: Millerntor-Stadion; Attendance: 28,980; Referee: Daniel Schlager (Hügelsheim)

22 February 2020 23	Hamburger SV	0–2	FC St. Pauli	Hamburg
13:00 CET		FCSP Report; Kicker Report	Diamantakos (yellow card) 12'; Veerman 20', (yellow card) 64'; Penney 29'; Ohlsson (yellow card) 62'; Buballa (yellow card) 82'	Stadium: Volksparkstadion; Attendance: 57,000; Referee: Manuel Gräfe (Berlin)

1 March 2020 24	FC St. Pauli	3–1	VfL Osnabrück	Hamburg
13:30 CET	Veerman 23'; Sobota 35', (yellow card) 66'; Diamantakos 48'; Ohlsson (yellow card) 60'	FCSP Report; Kicker Report	Taffertshofer (yellow card) 25'; Ajdini (yellow card) 74', (goal) 76'; Trapp (yellow card) 84'	Stadium: Millerntor-Stadion; Attendance: 29,546; Referee: Daniel Siebert (Berlin)

8 March 2020 25	SV Sandhausen	2–2	FC St. Pauli	Sandhausen
13:30 CET	Paqarada (yellow card) 24'; Behrens (yellow card) 42', (goal) 45+1' (pen.); Scheu 63'	FCSP Report; Kicker Report	Gyökeres 28'; Penney (yellow card) 44'; Østigård (yellow card) 66'; Diamantakos 78'	Stadium: BWT-Stadion am Hardtwald; Attendance: 9,872; Referee: René Rohde (Rostock)

17 May 2020 26	FC St. Pauli	1–0	1. FC Nürnberg	Hamburg
13:30 CEST	Benatelli (yellow card) 18'; Gyökeres 84'	FCSP Report; Kicker Report	Mathenia (red card) 55'	Stadium: Millerntor-Stadion; Attendance: no spectators Referee: Daniel Siebert (Berlin)
Note: Originally, the match was scheduled to be played on 15 March 2020 behind closed doors due to concerns over the coronavirus pandemic. On 13 March 2020 the DFL decided to postpone the 26th round of the 2nd Bundesliga.

23 May 2020 27	SV Darmstadt 98	4–0	FC St. Pauli	Darmstadt
13:00 CEST	Honsak 7'; Stark 74'; Mehlem 78'; Pálsson 89'	FCSP Report; Kicker Report	Buballa (yellow card) 53'; Østigård (yellow card) 88'; Diamantakos (penalty missed) 90'+1	Stadium: Merck-Stadion am Böllenfalltor; Attendance: no spectators Referee: Benedikt Kempkes (Thür)
Note: The match was postponed on 13 March 2020 due to concerns over the coronavirus pandemic.

27 May 2020 28	FC St. Pauli	0–0	1. FC Heidenheim	Hamburg
18:30 CEST	Miyaichi (yellow card) 22'; Coordes (yellow card) 47'; Flum (yellow card) 68'	FCSP Report; Kicker Report	Leipertz (penalty missed) 27'; Griesbeck (yellow card) 49'; Schnatterer (yellow card) 66'; Kleindienst (yellow card) 76'	Stadium: Millerntor-Stadion; Attendance: no spectators Referee: Lasse Koslowski (Berlin)
Note: The match was postponed on 24 March 2020 due to concerns over the coronavirus pandemic.

30 May 2020 29	Karlsruher SC	1–1	FC St. Pauli	Karlsruhe
13:00 CEST	Stiefler (yellow card) 16'; Gondorf (yellow card) 43', (goal) 57'; Ben-Hatira (penalty missed) 49'; Hofmann (yellow card) 66'	FCSP Report; Kicker Report	Diamantakos 55'; Ohlsson (yellow card) 82'; Luhukay (yellow card) 90'	Stadium: Wildparkstadion; Attendance: no spectartors Referee: Markus Schmidt (Stuttgart)
Note: The match was postponed on 24 March 2020 due to concerns over the coronavirus pandemic.

5 June 2020 30	VfL Bochum	2–0	FC St. Pauli	Bochum
18:30 CEST	Žulj 15' (pen.), (yellow card) 77'; Tesche (yellow card) 55'; Osei-Tutu (yellow card) 69'; Leitsch 73'	FCSP Report; Kicker Report	Østigård (yellow card) 14'; Ohlsson (yellow card) 36'; Gyökeres (yellow card) 75'	Stadium: Vonovia Ruhrstadion; Attendance: no spectators Referee: Florian Heft (Neuenkirchen-Vörden)
Note: The match was postponed on 24 March 2020 due to concerns over the coronavirus pandemic.

14 June 2020 31	FC St. Pauli	2–1	Erzgebirge Aue	Hamburg
13:30 CEST	Østigård (yellow card) 11'; Penney (yellow card) 16'; Diamantakos 22', (penalty missed) 45+2'; Veerman 41'	FCSP Report; Kicker Report	Rasmussen (yellow card) 45+1'; Gonther 74'; Strauß (yellow card) 80'	Stadium: Millerntor-Stadion; Attendance: no spectators Referee: Thorben Siewer (Olpe)
Note: The match was postponed on 24 March 2020 due to concerns over the coronavirus pandemic.

17 June 2020 32	Hannover 96	4–0	FC St. Pauli	Hanover
18:30 CEST	Ducksch 6'; Weydandt 17'; Haraguchi 61'; Muslija (yellow card) 77'; Teuchert 80'	FCSP Report; Kicker Report	Zander (yellow card) 59'	Stadium: HDI-Arena; Attendance: no spectators Referee: Alexander Sather (Grimma)
Note: The match was postponed on 31 March 2020 due to concerns over the coronavirus pandemic.

21 June 2020 33	FC St. Pauli	1–1	Jahn Regensburg	Hamburg
15:30 CEST	Diamantakos 11'; Sobota (yellow card) 59'; Østigård (yellow card) 62'; Senger (yellow card) 69'	FCSP Report; Kicker Report	Hein 27'	Stadium: Millerntor-Stadion; Attendance: no spectators Referee: Florian Heft (Neuenkirchen-Vörden)
Note: The match was postponed on 31 March 2020 due to concerns over the coronavirus pandemic.

28 June 2020 34	SV Wehen Wiesbaden	5–3	FC St. Pauli	Wiesbaden
15:30 CEST	Aigner 11', 38'; Tietz 12', 62' (pen.), 66'	FCSP Report; Kicker Report	Østigård 25'; Veerman 32', 73'; Becker (yellow card) 69'	Stadium: Brita-Arena; Attendance: no spectators Referee: Christian Dingert (Gries)
Note: The match was postponed on 31 March 2020 due to concerns over the coronavirus pandemic.

=== DFB-Pokal ===
11 August 2019 R1	VfB Lübeck	3–3 (a.e.t.) (3–4 p)	FC St. Pauli	Lübeck
15:30 CEST	Thiel (yellow card) 5', (goal) 55'; Deichmann 9'; Malone (yellow card) 60'; Halke (yellow card) 68'; Riedel (yellow card) 87'; Mende (yellow card) 96'; Arslan 115', (yellow card) 116'	DFB Report; Kicker Report; FCSP Report	Buballa (yellow card) 48'; Sobota 63'; Diamantakos 66', (red card) 119'; Lankford (yellow card) 84'; Sobota (yellow card) 88'; Knoll 94'	Stadium: Stadion Lohmühle; Attendance: 15,292; Referee: Frank Willenborg (Osnabrück)
	Penalties
	Arslan (penalty missed); Malone (penalty scored); Halke (penalty scored); Matovina (penalty scored); Fernandes (penalty missed)		(penalty scored) Sobota; (penalty missed) Hoffmann; (penalty scored) Lankford; (penalty scored) Buchtmann; (penalty scored) Knoll

30 October 2019 R2	FC St. Pauli	1–2	Eintracht Frankfurt	Hamburg
20:45 CET	Sobota 42' (pen.); Flum (yellow card) 69'; Knoll (yellow card) 80'	DFB Report; Kicker Report; FCSP Report	Dost 4', 16'; Hinteregger (yellow card) 42'; Kohr (yellow card) 84'; Joveljić (yellow card) 86'; Rode (yellow card) 90+1'	Stadium: Millerntor-Stadion; Attendance: 29,373; Referee: Matthias Jöllenbeck (Freiburg im Breisgau)

== Squad and statistics ==
As of 28 June 2020

No.	Pos	Player	2. Bundesliga		DFB-Pokal		Total	
No.	Pos	Player	Apps	Goals	Apps	Goals	Apps	Goals
2	DF	(Poland) Jakub Bednarczyk	1	0	0+1	0	2	0
3	DF	(Norway) Leo Skiri Østigård	26+2	1	1	0	29	1
4	DF	(Germany) Philipp Ziereis	3+3	0	0	0	6	0
5	DF	(Germany) Marvin Knoll	21+3	0	2	1	26	1
6	MF	(Germany) Christopher Avevor	2+1	0	0	0	3	0
7	MF	(Germany) Kevin Lankford	1+6	0	0+1	0	8	0
8	DF	(Germany) Marc Hornschuh	1+1	0	1	0	3	0
9	FW	(Sweden) Viktor Gyökeres	19+7	7	2	0	28	7
10	MF	(Germany) Christopher Buchtmann	4+8	0	1	0	13	0
12	MF	(Japan) Ryo Miyaichi	28+1	1	1	0	30	1
15	DF	(Germany) Daniel Buballa	27	0	2	0	29	0
17	DF	(England) Matt Penney	13+4	1	1	0	18	1
18	FW	(Greece) Dimitrios Diamantakos	18+3	11	1	1	22	12
19	DF	(Germany) Luca-Milan Zander	16+1	0	0	0	17	0
20	MF	(South Korea) Park Yi-young	1	0	0	0	1	0
21	DF	(Wales) James Lawrence	11+3	1	0	0	14	1
22	MF	(Germany) Maximilian Franzke	1+4	0	0	0	5	0
23	MF	(Germany) Johannes Flum	6+10	0	1	0	17	0
24	FW	(Ukraine) Borys Tashchy	2+16	0	0+1	0	19	0
25	FW	(Netherlands) Henk Veerman	16+6	11	0	0	22	11
26	MF	(Germany) Rico Benatelli	10+5	0	0	0	15	0
27	DF	(Germany) Jan-Philipp Kalla	5+3	0	1	0	9	0
28	MF	(Poland) Waldemar Sobota	25+2	1	2	2	29	3
30	GK	(Germany) Robin Himmelmann	33	0	1	0	34	0
31	MF	(Germany) Ersin Zehir	1+1	0	0	0	2	0
32	MF	(Germany) Christian Conteh	5+2	2	1+1	0	9	2
33	GK	(Germany) Svend Brodersen	0	0	0	0	0	0
34	DF	(Germany) Mert Kuyucu	1+1	0	0	0	2	0
36	FW	(Germany) Luis Coordes	4+7	0	0	0	11	0
37	MF	(Germany) Finn Ole Becker	19+9	1	0+1	0	29	1
38	DF	(Germany) Florian Carstens	3+1	0	0	0	4	0
40	GK	(Germany) Korbinian Müller	1	0	1	0	2	0
41	MF	(Germany) Christian Viet	4	0	0	0	4	0
42	DF	(Germany) Marvin Senger	3	0	0	0	3	0
43	DF	(Sweden) Sebastian Ohlsson	23	0	1	0	24	0
Players transferred out during the season
13	MF	(Germany) Niklas Hoffmann	3+2	0	0+1	0	6	0
14	MF	(Norway) Mats Møller Dæhli	15+1	1	2	0	18	1
22	MF	(Turkey) Cenk Şahin	0	0	0+1	0	1	0
44	MF	(Mali) Youba Diarra	1+2	0	0	0	3	0
