= 2018–19 FC St. Pauli season =

FC St. Pauli
2018–19 season
- President: Oke Göttlich
- Manager: Markus Kauczinski (until 10 April 2019); Jos Luhukay (since 10 April 2019)
- Stadium: Millerntor-Stadion
- 2. Bundesliga: 9th
- DFB-Pokal: First round
- Top goalscorer: League: Dimitrios Diamantakos (6); All: Dimitrios Diamantakos (7)
Home colours	Away colours	Third colours
- All statistics correct as of 25 June 2019.

The 2018–19 FC St. Pauli season is the 108th season in the football club's history and 8th consecutive season in the second division of German football, the 2. Bundesliga and 26th overall. In addition to the domestic league, FC St. Pauli also are participating in this season's edition of the domestic cup, the DFB-Pokal. This is the 56th season for FC St. Pauli in the Millerntor-Stadion, located in St. Pauli, Hamburg, Germany. The season covers a period from 1 July 2018 to 30 June 2019.

== Players ==
=== Squad information ===
As of 20 June 2019

Note: Flags indicate national team as defined under FIFA eligibility rules; some limited exceptions apply. Players may hold more than one non-FIFA nationality.

No.	Pos.	Nation	Player
1	GK	GER	Korbinian Müller
2	DF	POL	Jakub Bednarczyk
4	DF	GER	Philipp Ziereis
5	DF	GER	Marvin Knoll
6	MF	GER	Christopher Avevor (Captain)
7	MF	GER	Kevin Lankford
8	MF	GER	Jeremy Dudziak
9	FW	GER	Alexander Meier
10	MF	GER	Christopher Buchtmann
11	FW	TUN	Sami Allagui
13	MF	JPN	Ryo Miyaichi
14	MF	NOR	Mats Møller Dæhli
15	DF	GER	Daniel Buballa
16	DF	GER	Marc Hornschuh
19	DF	GER	Luca-Milan Zander (on loan from Werder Bremen)
20	MF	GER	Richard Neudecker

No.	Pos.	Nation	Player
22	DF	NED	Justin Hoogma (on loan from 1899 Hoffenheim)
23	MF	GER	Johannes Flum
25	FW	NED	Henk Veerman
27	DF	GER	Jan-Philipp Kalla
28	MF	POL	Waldemar Sobota
29	FW	GER	Jan-Marc Schneider
30	GK	GER	Robin Himmelmann
31	MF	GER	Ersin Zehir
33	GK	GER	Svend Brodersen
34	MF	GER	Jakob Münzner
35	DF	GER	Brian Koglin
36	FW	GER	Luis Coordes
37	MF	GER	Finn Ole Becker
38	DF	GER	Florian Carstens
39	DF	KOR	Park Yi-young
45	FW	GRE	Dimitrios Diamantakos

=== Transfers ===
==== Summer ====
In:

No.	Pos.	Nation	Player
1	GK	GER	Korbinian Müller (from SpVgg Unterhaching)
5	DF	GER	Marvin Knoll (from Jahn Regensburg)
14	MF	NOR	Mats Møller Dæhli (from SC Freiburg, previously on loan)
25	FW	NED	Henk Veerman (from Heerenveen)
31	MF	GER	Ersin Zehir (from FC St. Pauli II)
34	MF	GER	Jakob Münzner (from FC St. Pauli youth)
36	FW	GER	Luis Coordes (from FC St. Pauli youth)
37	MF	GER	Finn Ole Becker (from FC St. Pauli youth)

Out:

No.	Pos.	Nation	Player
1	GK	GER	Philipp Heerwagen (to FC Ingolstadt 04)
3	DF	GER	Lasse Sobiech (to 1. FC Köln)
5	DF	SUI	Joël Keller (to SC Weiche Flensburg 08)
9	FW	MAR	Aziz Bouhaddouz (to Al-Batin FC)
31	MF	GER	Maurice Litka (on loan to KFC Uerdingen 05)
37	MF	KOR	Choi Kyoung-rok (to Karlsruher SC)
42	MF	BEL	Thibaud Verlinden (loan return to Stoke City)
—	FW	GER	Marvin Ducksch (to Fortuna Düsseldorf, previously on loan at Holstein Kiel)

==== Winter ====
In:

No.	Pos.	Nation	Player
2	DF	POL	Jakub Bednarczyk (from Bayer Leverkusen)
7	MF	GER	Kevin Lankford (from 1. FC Heidenheim)
9	FW	GER	Alexander Meier (free agent)
22	DF	NED	Justin Hoogma (on loan from 1899 Hoffenheim)
38	DF	GER	Florian Carstens (from FC St. Pauli II)

Out:

No.	Pos.	Nation	Player
2	DF	GER	Clemens Schoppenhauer (to VfR Aalen)
7	MF	GER	Bernd Nehrig (to Eintracht Braunschweig)
22	MF	TUR	Cenk Şahin (on loan to FC Ingolstadt 04)

== Matches ==
=== Legend ===
Win Draw Loss

=== Friendly matches ===
28 June 2018 Friendly	AWesA Allstars	1−10	FC St. Pauli	Hamelin
19:00	Avci 88'	Report	Diamantakos 8'; Neudecker 15', 22'; Buchtmann 18'; Şahin 34'; Allagui 54', 75', 83'; Zehir 68'; Schneider 76'	Stadium: Weserberglandstadion; Attendance: Benjamin Schmidt; Referee: 3,000

1 July 2018 Friendly	Eutin 08	0−4	FC St. Pauli	Eutin
15:30		Report	Allagui 17'; Sobota 32'; Zehir 62'; Schneider 68'	Stadium: Stadion Waldeck; Attendance: 900; Referee: Max Rosenthal

7 July 2018 Friendly	SC Weiche Flensburg 08	1−6	FC St. Pauli	Flensburg
12:00	Hartmann 7'	Report	Zehir 11'; Viet 20'; Møller Dæhli 28'; Allagui 63', 79', 83'	Stadium: Manfred-Werner-Stadion; Attendance: 804; Referee: Timo Winkel

8 July 2018 Friendly	Brøndby IF	3−0	FC St. Pauli	Brøndbyvester, Denmark
15:30	Erceg 18'; Kaiser 42'; Blažek 90+1'	Report		Stadium: Brøndby Stadion; Attendance: 6,106

11 July 2018 Friendly	FC Pinzgau Saalfelden	0−8	FC St. Pauli	Saalfelden, Austria
18:30		Report	Knoll 9'; Sobota 11', 24'; Buchtmann 36'; Schneider 45'; Allagui 56', 79', 80'	Stadium: Sportanlage Bürgerau

14 July 2018 Friendly	FC Liefering	0−3	FC St. Pauli	St Johann im Pongau, Austria
16:00		Report	Møller Dæhli 19'; Allagui 58'; Şahin 81'	Stadium: Sportplatz St. Johann

17 July 2018 Friendly	Karlsruher SC	4−1	FC St. Pauli	Sankt Ulrich am Pillersee, Austria
18:00	Muslija 23', 66'; Kobald 81'; Fink 86'	Report	Bouhaddouz 77'	Stadium: Sportplatz St. Ulrich

28 July 2018 Friendly	FC St. Pauli	2−0	Stoke City	Hamburg
15:30	Møller Dæhli 60'; Schneider 80'	Report		Stadium: Millerntor-Stadion; Attendance: 15,311; Referee: Sven Jablonski (Bremen)

6 September 2018 Friendly	FSV Frankfurt	1−2	FC St. Pauli	Frankfurt am Main
18:30	Crnomut 26'	Report	Diamantakos 2'; Miyaichi 16'	Stadium: PSD Bank Arena; Attendance: 498; Referee: Julius Martenstein (Cölbe)

11 October 2018 Friendly	Altona 93	0−5	FC St. Pauli	Hamburg
19:00		Report	Allagui 2'; Veerman 21'; Carstens 24'; Meißner 56', 60'	Stadium: Millerntor-Stadion; Attendance: 2,089; Referee: Murat Yilmaz (Hamburg)

14 November 2018 Friendly	Niendorfer TSV	2−3	FC St. Pauli	Hamburg
19:00	Boettcher 11'; Doege 34'	Report	Koglin 12'; Şahin 21'; Veerman 43'	Stadium: Sportanlage Sachsenweg

11 January 2019 Friendly	Charleroi	3−2	FC St. Pauli	Marbella, Spain
15:00	Perbet 75', 100'; Ilaimaharitra 103'	Report	Meier 26'; Schneider 71'	Stadium: Marbella Football Center
Note: The game was played in two halves of 60 minutes each.

16 January 2019 Friendly	SV Wehen Wiesbaden	2−3	FC St. Pauli	Marbella, Spain
15:00	Schäffler 31'; Brandstetter 101'	Report	Zander 14'; Meier 47'; Allagui 119' (pen.)	Stadium: Marbella Football Center
Note: The game was played in two halves of 60 minutes each.

21 January 2019 Friendly	FC St. Pauli	0−0	KFC Uerdingen 05	Hamburg
14:15		Report		Stadium: Millerntor-Stadion

21 March 2019 Friendly	FC St. Pauli	1−0	Vejle BK	Hamburg
14:00	Schneider 79'	Report		Stadium: Trainingszentrum Fc St. Pauli; Referee: Eric Müller (Bremen)

24 May 2019 Friendly	New York Cosmos	2−1	FC St. Pauli	New York City, United States
1:30	Sembroni 6'; Hassan (yellow card) 89'	Report	Allagui 15' (pen.)	Stadium: Rocco B. Comisso Soccer Stadium

25 May 2019 Friendly	FC Buffalo	0−2	FC St. Pauli	Buffalo, United States
21:00		Report	Allagui 9'; Lankford 48'	Stadium: Robert E. Rich All-High Stadium; Attendance: 1,500

=== 2. Bundesliga ===
==== League table ====
Pos	Team	Pld	W	D	L	GF	GA	GD	Pts
7	Arminia Bielefeld	34	13	10	11	52	50	+2	49
8	Jahn Regensburg	34	12	13	9	55	54	+1	49
9	FC St. Pauli	34	14	7	13	46	53	−7	49
10	Darmstadt 98	34	13	7	14	45	53	−8	46
11	VfL Bochum	34	11	11	12	49	50	−1	44

Source: DFB
Rules for classification: 1) Points; 2) Goal difference; 3) Goals scored; 4) Head-to-head points; 5) Head-to-head goal difference; 6) Head-to-head goals scored; 7) Head-to-head away goals scored; 8) Away goals scored; 9) Play-off.

==== Results summary ====
Overall								Home						Away					
Pld	W	D	L	GF	GA	GD	Pts	W	D	L	GF	GA	GD	W	D	L	GF	GA	GD
34	14	7	13	46	53	−7	49	8	5	4	28	23	+5	6	2	9	18	30	−12

Last updated: 19 May 2019.
Source: Kicker

==== Results by round ====
Round	1	2	3	4	5	6	7	8	9	10	11	12	13	14	15	16	17	18	19	20	21	22	23	24	25	26	27	28	29	30	31	32	33	34
Ground	A	H	A	H	A	A	H	A	H	A	H	A	H	A	H	A	H	H	A	H	A	H	H	A	H	A	H	A	H	A	H	A	H	A
Result	W	W	L	L	L	W	W	D	W	W	L	W	D	D	D	W	W	W	L	W	L	L	W	W	L	L	D	L	D	L	W	L	D	L
Position	4	1	6	9	11	11	7	6	5	3	5	2	4	4	4	4	4	3	4	2	5	6	4	4	4	4	5	6	7	8	6	6	7	9

Updated to match(es) played on 19 May 2019. Source: Kicker
A = Away; H = Home; W = Win; D = Draw; L = Loss

==== Matches ====
5 August 2018 1	1. FC Magdeburg	1−2	FC St. Pauli	Magdeburg
13:30	Beck 16'	FCSP Report; Kicker Report	Buchtmann 29'; Flum (yellow card) 45+1'; Knoll 81'	Stadium: MDCC-Arena; Attendance: 24,156; Referee: Frank Willenborg (Osnabrück)

10 August 2018 2	FC St. Pauli	2−0	SV Darmstadt 98	Hamburg
20:30	Flum (yellow card) 37'; Neudecker 52'; Ziereis (yellow card) 75'; Buchtmann 85'; Sobota (yellow card) 87'	FCSP Report; Kicker Report	Kempe (yellow card) 49'; Medojević (yellow card) 75'; Sulu (yellow card) 78'	Stadium: Millerntor-Stadion; Attendance: 29,140; Referee: Guido Winkmann (Kerken)

26 August 2018 3	1. FC Union Berlin	4−1	FC St. Pauli	Berlin
13:30	Prömel 44'; Gogia 45'; Andersson 57', 88'; Redondo (yellow card) 76'	FCSP Report; Kicker Report	Flum (yellow card) 31'; Buchtmann (yellow card) 38'; Şahin (yellow card) 64'; Veerman 71'	Stadium: Stadion An der Alten Försterei; Attendance: 22,012; Referee: Sven Jablonski (Bremen)

2 September 2018 4	FC St. Pauli	3−5	1. FC Köln	Hamburg
13:30	Veerman 13'; Dudziak 25'; Møller Dæhli (yellow card) 27'; Buchtmann 65'	FCSP Report; Kicker Report	Clemens 35'; Terodde 45', 53' (pen.); Guirassy 57'; Sobiech (yellow card) 78'; Özcan 90'; Hauptmann (yellow card) 90'	Stadium: Millerntor-Stadion; Attendance: 29,546; Referee: Benjamin Cortus (Röthenbach an der Pegnitz)

16 September 2018 5	FC Erzgebirge Aue	3−1	FC St. Pauli	Aue
13:30	Kempe 12', (yellow card) 66'; Testroet 31'; Hochscheidt 75'; Rizzuto (yellow card) 77'	FCSP Report; Kicker Report	Veerman 16'; Buchtmann (yellow card) 79'	Stadium: Erzgebirgsstadion; Attendance: 13,000; Referee: Bastian Dankert (Rostock)

21 September 2018 6	FC Ingolstadt 04	0−1	FC St. Pauli	Ingolstadt
18:30	Kerschbaumer (yellow card) 31' (yellow-red card) 77'; Röcher (yellow card) 61'; Lezcano (yellow card) 71'	FCSP Report; Kicker Report	Miyaichi 82'	Stadium: Audi Sportpark; Attendance: 10,164; Referee: Patrick Alt (Illingen)

26 September 2018 7	FC St. Pauli	2−1	SC Paderborn 07	Hamburg
18:30	Diamantakos 36'; Knoll (yellow card) 67'; Neudecker 90+2'	FCSP Report; Kicker Report	Schwede (yellow card) 39'; Gjasula (yellow card) 63'; Gueye (yellow card) 68' (yellow-red card) 85'; Klement (yellow card) 71'	Stadium: Millerntor-Stadion; Attendance: 29,546; Referee: Sven Waschitzki (Essen)

30 September 2018 8	Hamburger SV	0−0	FC St. Pauli	Hamburg
13:30	Arp (yellow card) 69'; Janjičić (yellow card) 81'	FCSP Report; Kicker Report	Şahin (yellow card) 22'; Flum (yellow card) 32'; Buchtmann (yellow card) 68'	Stadium: Volksparkstadion; Attendance: 57,000; Referee: Markus Schmidt (Stuttgart)

7 October 2018 9	FC St. Pauli	3−1	SV Sandhausen	Hamburg
13:30	Diamantakos 17'; Miyaichi (yellow card) 41'; Dudziak (yellow card) 55'; Allagui 90'; Buchtmann 90+4'	FCSP Report; Kicker Report	Kister (yellow card) 13'; Verlaat (yellow card) 40'; Förster (yellow card) 48'; Behrens 73'	Stadium: Millerntor-Stadion; Attendance: 29,546; Referee: Robert Kempter (Stockach)

22 October 2018 10	MSV Duisburg	0−1	FC St. Pauli	Duisburg
20:30	Fröde (yellow card) 30'	FCSP Report; Kicker Report	Ziereis (yellow card) 54'; Avevor (yellow card) 80'; Allagui 84'	Stadium: Schauinsland-Reisen-Arena; Attendance: 20,130; Referee: Pascal Müller (Löchgau)

28 October 2018 11	FC St. Pauli	0−1	Holstein Kiel	Hamburg
13:30	Allagui (yellow card) 64'	FCSP Report; Kicker Report	Dehm (yellow card) 7'; Schmidt (yellow card) 30'; Serra 59'	Stadium: Millerntor-Stadion; Attendance: 29,546; Referee: Bastian Dankert (Rostock)

4 November 2018 12	Arminia Bielefeld	1−2	FC St. Pauli	Bielefeld
18:30	Staude 7', (yellow card) 14'; Klos (yellow card) 54'; Lucoqui (yellow card) 82'	FCSP Report; Kicker Report	Knoll 49' (pen.); Møller Dæhli 56', (yellow card) 90+4'; Nehrig (yellow card) 90+2'	Stadium: SchücoArena; Attendance: 22,446; Referee: Benedikt Kempkes (Thür)

10 November 2018 13	FC St. Pauli	1−1	1. FC Heidenheim	Hamburg
13:00	Veerman 52', (yellow card) 78'; Flum (yellow card) 71'; Allagui (yellow card) 78'; Ziereis (yellow card) 90+2'	FCSP Report; Kicker Report	Schnatterer 52'	Stadium: Millerntor-Stadion; Attendance: 29,546; Referee: Christian Dietz (Munich)

25 November 2018 14	SSV Jahn Regensburg	1−1	FC St. Pauli	Regensburg
13:30	Stolze 87'	FCSP Report; Kicker Report	Veerman 39'; Ziereis (yellow card) 43'; Dudziak (yellow card) 61'; Buchtmann (yellow card) 63'; Miyaichi (yellow card) 90+1'	Stadium: Continental Arena; Attendance: 15,210; Referee: Sven Waschitzki (Essen)

1 December 2018 15	FC St. Pauli	1−1	Dynamo Dresden	Hamburg
13:00	Zehir (yellow card) 30'; Dudziak 47', (yellow card) 89'	FCSP Report; Kicker Report	Dumić (yellow card) 55'; Müller 86'; Kreuzer (yellow card) 88'	Stadium: Millerntor-Stadion; Attendance: 29,546; Referee: Deniz Aytekin (Oberasbach)

10 December 2018 16	VfL Bochum	1−3	FC St. Pauli	Bochum
20:30	Hinterseer 35'; Riemann (yellow card) 41'; Weilandt (yellow card) 58'	FCSP Report; Kicker Report	Allagui 15', (penalty missed) 42'; Ziereis (yellow card) 23'; Veerman 42', (yellow card) 83'; Zander (yellow card) 53'; Møller Dæhli 86'	Stadium: Vonovia Ruhrstadion; Attendance: 22,916; Referee: Benedikt Kempkes (Thür)

15 December 2018 17	FC St. Pauli	2−0	SpVgg Greuther Fürth	Hamburg
13:00	Carstens 21'; Miyaichi 69'; Diamantakos (yellow card) 79'	FCSP Report; Kicker Report	Maloča (yellow card) 43'; Gugganig (yellow card) 79'; Magyar (yellow card) 84'	Stadium: Millerntor-Stadion; Attendance: 29,546; Referee: Felix Zwayer (Berlin)

22 December 2018 18	FC St. Pauli	4−1	1. FC Magdeburg	Hamburg
13:00	Nehrig 16', (yellow card) 44'; Veerman (yellow card) 32'; Knoll 59' (pen.); Diamantakos 63', 90+3', (yellow card) 90+2'	FCSP Report; Kicker Report	Erdmann (yellow card) 32'; Brunst (yellow card) 58'; Costly (yellow card) 90+1'	Stadium: Millerntor-Stadion; Attendance: 29,546; Referee: Daniel Schlager (Hügelsheim)

29 January 2019 19	SV Darmstadt 98	2−1	FC St. Pauli	Darmstadt
18:30	Pálsson (yellow card) 38'; Heller 81'; Dursun 89'	FCSP Report; Kicker Report	Miyaichi 37'; Carstens (yellow card) 45+2'	Stadium: Merck-Stadion am Böllenfalltor; Attendance: 11,800; Referee: Manuel Gräfe (Berlin)

4 February 2019 20	FC St. Pauli	3−2	1. FC Union Berlin	Hamburg
20:30	Allagui (yellow card) 4', (goal) 23'; Flum (yellow card) 33'; Knoll (yellow card) 84'; Meier 62', 90+4' (pen.)	FCSP Report; Kicker Report	Schmiedebach (yellow card) 12'; Friedrich (yellow card) 37'; Lenz (yellow card) 60'; Prömel 84'; Abdullahi 86'	Stadium: Millerntor-Stadion; Attendance: 29,546; Referee: Guido Winkmann (Kerken)

8 February 2019 21	1. FC Köln	4−1	FC St. Pauli	Cologne
18:30	Córdoba 32', 53', 58', (yellow card) 54'; Terodde 85'	FCSP Report; Kicker Report	Meier 38'; Carstens (yellow card) 47'	Stadium: RheinEnergieStadion; Attendance: 50,000; Referee: Sören Storks (Velen)

16 February 2019 22	FC St. Pauli	1−2	FC Erzgebirge Aue	Hamburg
13:00	Buchtmann 11'; Avevor (yellow card) 76'	FCSP Report; Kicker Report	Kusić (yellow card) 6'; Cacutalua (yellow card) 20'; Hochscheidt 29', 49'; Wydra (yellow card) 38'; Zulechner (yellow card) 89'	Stadium: Millerntor-Stadion; Attendance: 29,546; Referee: Florian Badstübner (Windsbach)

23 February 2019 23	FC St. Pauli	1−0	FC Ingolstadt 04	Hamburg
13:00	Knoll (yellow card) 45'; Meier 54'; Buchtmann (yellow card) 58'; Buballa (yellow card) 63'; Miyaichi (yellow card) 86'; Sobota (yellow card) 90+4'	FCSP Report; Kicker Report	Şahin (yellow card) 84'; Röcher (yellow card) 72' (yellow-red card) 90+1'	Stadium: Millerntor-Stadion; Attendance: 29,546; Referee: René Rohde (Rostock)

2 March 2019 24	SC Paderborn 07	0−1	FC St. Pauli	Paderborn
13:00	Tekpetey (yellow card) 56'; Zingerle (yellow card) 73'; Strohdiek (yellow card) 80'	FCSP Report; Kicker Report	Kalla (yellow card) 42'; Zehir (yellow card) 47' (yellow-red card) 87'; Schneider (yellow card) 72'; Meier 81'; Buballa (yellow card) 90+2'	Stadium: Benteler-Arena; Attendance: 14,504; Referee: Bibiana Steinhaus (Langenhagen)

10 March 2019 25	FC St. Pauli	0−4	Hamburger SV	Hamburg
13:30		FCSP Report; Kicker Report	Lasogga 32', 61'; Narey 53'; Santos 88'	Stadium: Millerntor-Stadion; Attendance: 29,226; Referee: Felix Brych (Munich)

16 March 2019 26	SV Sandhausen	4−0	FC St. Pauli	Sandhausen
13:00	Wooten 34'; Förster 43', 49', (yellow card) 72'; Schleusener 46'	FCSP Report; Kicker Report	Buchtmann (yellow card) 24'	Stadium: BWT-Stadion am Hardtwald; Attendance: 10,657; Referee: Sven Waschitzki (Essen)

29 March 2019 27	FC St. Pauli	0−0	MSV Duisburg	Hamburg
18:30	Sobota (yellow card) 62'; Carstens (yellow card) 79'	FCSP Report; Kicker Report	Fröde (yellow card) 12'; Nauber (yellow card) 71'	Stadium: Millerntor-Stadion; Attendance: 29,546; Referee: Bastian Dankert (Rostock)

6 April 2019 28	Holstein Kiel	2−1	FC St. Pauli	Kiel
13:00	Van den Bergh (yellow card) 28'; Lee (yellow card) 32', (goal) 53'; Thesker (red card) 41'; Mühling 50' (pen.)	FCSP Report; Kicker Report	Dudziak (yellow card) 11'; Meier 43' (pen.); Flum (yellow card) 49'	Stadium: Holstein-Stadion; Attendance: 13,274; Referee: Felix Zwayer (Berlin)

14 April 2019 29	FC St. Pauli	1−1	Arminia Bielefeld	Hamburg
13:30	Park (yellow card) 4'; Miyaichi 48'; Buchtmann (yellow card) 56'; Carstens (yellow card) 75'	FCSP Report; Kicker Report	Klos 5' (pen.); Voglsammer (yellow card) 45+1'; Weihrauch (yellow card) 64'; Behrendt (yellow card) 60'	Stadium: Millerntor-Stadion; Attendance: 29,546; Referee: Sascha Stegemann (Niederkassel)

21 April 2019 30	1. FC Heidenheim	3−0	FC St. Pauli	Heidenheim an der Brenz
13:30	Schnatterer 18'; Dovedan 26', 28'	FCSP Report; Kicker Report	Becker (yellow card) 52' (yellow-red card) 73'	Stadium: Voith-Arena; Attendance: 13,700; Referee: Benjamin Cortus (Röthenbach an der Pegnitz)

27 April 2019 31	FC St. Pauli	4−3	SSV Jahn Regensburg	Hamburg
13:00	Diamantakos 35'; Flum (yellow card) 42', (goal) 52'; Knoll 72'; Miyaichi (yellow card) 82', (goal) 86'	FCSP Report; Kicker Report	Saller (yellow card) 9'; Al Ghaddioui 27', 40', (yellow card) 42'; Nachreiner (yellow card) 71'; George (yellow card) 84'; Adamyan 90+5'	Stadium: Millerntor-Stadion; Attendance: 29,546; Referee: Patrick Alt (Illingen)

3 May 2019 32	Dynamo Dresden	2−1	FC St. Pauli	Dresden
18:30	Ebert 23' (pen.); Burnić (yellow card) 55', (goal) 75'; Koné (yellow card) 63'	FCSP Report; Kicker Report	Miyaichi (yellow card) 15'; Diamantakos 57'; Becker (yellow card) 60'; Park (yellow card) 82'	Stadium: Rudolf-Harbig-Stadion; Attendance: 30,803; Referee: Robert Kempter (Stockach)

12 May 2019 33	FC St. Pauli	0−0	VfL Bochum	Hamburg
15:30		FCSP Report; Kicker Report	Pantović (yellow card) 67'	Stadium: Millerntor-Stadion; Attendance: 29,546; Referee: Daniel Siebert (Berlin)

19 May 2019 34	SpVgg Greuther Fürth	2−1	FC St. Pauli	Fürth
15:30	Sarpei (yellow card) 19'; Sauer (yellow card) 30'; Reese 51'; Green (yellow card) 57'; Wittek (yellow card) 59'; Jaeckel (yellow card) 81'; Magyar 90+2'	FCSP Report; Kicker Report	Koglin (yellow card) 23' (yellow-red card) 61'; Diamantakos 53'; Becker (yellow card) 84'	Stadium: Sportpark Ronhof Thomas Sommer; Attendance: 13,890; Referee: Robert Kampka (Mainz)

=== DFB-Pokal ===
17 August 2018 R1	SV Wehen Wiesbaden	3−2 (a.e.t.)	FC St. Pauli	Wiesbaden
20:45	Reddemann 35'; Shipnoski (yellow card) 43'; Andrist (yellow card) 58'; Mrwoca (yellow card) 88'; Schäffler 103' (pen.); Schmidt 105+1'	DFB Report; Kicker Report; FCSP Report	Neudecker 51'; Buballa (yellow card) 90+3'; Knoll (yellow card) 94'; Ziereis (yellow card) 102'; Avevor 109'; Diamantakos (yellow card) 115'	Stadium: Brita-Arena; Attendance: 10,007; Referee: Christian Dingert (Gries)

== Squad and statistics ==
As of 19 May 2019

No.	Pos	Player	2. Bundesliga		DFB-Pokal		Total	
No.	Pos	Player	Apps	Goals	Apps	Goals	Apps	Goals
1	GK	(Germany) Korbinian Müller	0	0	0	0	0	0
2	DF	(Poland) Jakub Bednarczyk	0	0	0	0	0	0
4	DF	(Germany) Philipp Ziereis	16	0	1	0	17	0
5	DF	(Germany) Marvin Knoll	29+1	4	1	0	31	4
6	MF	(Germany) Christopher Avevor	25	0	1	1	26	1
7	MF	(Germany) Kevin Lankford	3+2	0	0	0	5	0
8	MF	(Germany) Jeremy Dudziak	24	2	1	0	25	2
9	FW	(Germany) Alexander Meier	11+5	6	0	0	16	6
10	MF	(Germany) Christopher Buchtmann	23+1	5	0	0	24	5
11	FW	(Tunisia) Sami Allagui	19+3	4	1	0	23	4
12	MF	(Japan) Ryo Miyaichi	17+8	5	0	0	25	5
14	MF	(Norway) Mats Møller Dæhli	30+2	2	1	0	33	2
15	DF	(Germany) Daniel Buballa	26+1	0	1	0	28	0
16	DF	(Germany) Marc Hornschuh	0	0	0	0	0	0
18	FW	(Greece) Dimitrios Diamantakos	10+8	7	0+1	0	19	7
19	DF	(Germany) Luca-Milan Zander	11+1	0	0	0	12	0
20	MF	(Germany) Richard Neudecker	8+8	2	1	1	17	3
22	DF	(Netherlands) Justin Hoogma	13+1	0	0	0	14	0
23	MF	(Germany) Johannes Flum	18+3	1	1	0	22	1
25	FW	(Netherlands) Henk Veerman	7+9	6	0+1	0	17	6
27	DF	(Germany) Jan-Philipp Kalla	10	0	0	0	10	0
28	MF	(Poland) Waldemar Sobota	8+7	0	1	0	16	0
29	FW	(Germany) Jan-Marc Schneider	0+9	0	0	0	9	0
30	GK	(Germany) Robin Himmelmann	32	0	1	0	33	0
31	MF	(Germany) Ersin Zehir	3+14	0	0	0	17	0
33	GK	(Germany) Svend Brodersen	2	0	0	0	2	0
34	MF	(Germany) Jakob Münzner	0	0	0	0	0	0
35	DF	(Germany) Brian Koglin	2	0	0	0	2	0
36	FW	(Germany) Luis Coordes	0+2	0	0	0	2	0
37	MF	(Germany) Finn Ole Becker	3+2	0	0	0	5	0
38	DF	(Germany) Florian Carstens	12+6	1	0	0	18	1
39	MF	(South Korea) Park Yi-young	6+1	0	0	0	7	0
Players transferred out during the season
2	DF	(Germany) Clemens Schoppenhauer	0	0	0	0	0	0
7	MF	(Germany) Bernd Nehrig	2+4	1	0+1	0	7	1
22	MF	(Turkey) Cenk Şahin	4+3	0	0+1	0	8	0
