= List of German football transfers winter 2018–19 =

This is a list of German football transfers in the winter transfer window 2018–19 by club. Only transfers of the Bundesliga and 2. Bundesliga are included.

== Bundesliga ==
Note: Flags indicate national team as has been defined under FIFA eligibility rules. Players may hold more than one non-FIFA nationality.

=== FC Bayern Munich ===
In:

No.	Pos.	Nation	Player
19	FW	CAN	Alphonso Davies (from Vancouver Whitecaps)

Out:

No.	Pos.	Nation	Player
2	FW	GER	Sandro Wagner (to Tianjin TEDA)

=== FC Schalke 04 ===
In:

No.	Pos.	Nation	Player
14	FW	WAL	Rabbi Matondo (from Manchester City U23)
15	FW	TUR	Ahmed Kutucu (from FC Schalke 04 youth)
27	DF	NED	Jeffrey Bruma (on loan from VfL Wolfsburg)

Out:

No.	Pos.	Nation	Player
6	MF	GER	Johannes Geis (to 1. FC Köln)
9	FW	ARG	Franco Di Santo (to Rayo Vallecano)
14	DF	GHA	Baba Rahman (loan return to Chelsea)
29	DF	BRA	Naldo (to Monaco)

=== 1899 Hoffenheim ===
In:

No.	Pos.	Nation	Player
42	MF	AUT	Christoph Baumgartner (from 1899 Hoffenheim II)
31	DF	BRA	Lucas Ribeiro (from Vitória)

Out:

No.	Pos.	Nation	Player
6	MF	NOR	Håvard Nordtveit (to Fulham)
17	MF	SUI	Steven Zuber (on loan to VfB Stuttgart)
23	FW	BRA	Felipe Pires (on loan to Palmeiras)
24	DF	NED	Justin Hoogma (on loan to FC St. Pauli)
25	DF	GER	Kevin Akpoguma (on loan to Hannover 96)
32	MF	ITA	Vincenzo Grifo (on loan to SC Freiburg)
36	GK	SUI	Gregor Kobel (on loan to FC Augsburg)

=== Borussia Dortmund ===
In:

No.	Pos.	Nation	Player
9	FW	ESP	Paco Alcácer (from Barcelona, previously on loan)
18	DF	ARG	Leonardo Balerdi (from Boca Juniors)
22	MF	USA	Christian Pulisic (on loan from Chelsea)

Out:

No.	Pos.	Nation	Player
14	FW	SWE	Alexander Isak (on loan to Willem II)
15	DF	GER	Jeremy Toljan (on loan to Celtic)
18	MF	GER	Sebastian Rode (on loan to Eintracht Frankfurt)
22	MF	USA	Christian Pulisic (to Chelsea)
23	MF	JPN	Shinji Kagawa (on loan to Beşiktaş)
32	MF	GER	Dženis Burnić (on loan to Dynamo Dresden)

=== Bayer 04 Leverkusen ===
In:

No.	Pos.	Nation	Player

Out:

No.	Pos.	Nation	Player
32	DF	POL	Jakub Bednarczyk (to FC St. Pauli)
40	GK	POL	Tomasz Kucz (on loan to Dunajská Streda)

=== RB Leipzig ===
In:

No.	Pos.	Nation	Player
8	MF	MLI	Amadou Haidara (from Red Bull Salzburg)
14	MF	USA	Tyler Adams (from New York Red Bulls)
18	MF	ENG	Emile Smith Rowe (on loan from Arsenal)

Out:

No.	Pos.	Nation	Player
—	MF	GER	Felix Beiersdorf (released, previously on loan at Meuselwitz)

=== VfB Stuttgart ===
In:

No.	Pos.	Nation	Player
9	MF	SUI	Steven Zuber (on loan from 1899 Hoffenheim)
14	MF	GER	Alexander Esswein (on loan from Hertha BSC)
18	DF	TUR	Ozan Kabak (from Galatasaray)

Out:

No.	Pos.	Nation	Player
31	MF	TUR	Berkay Özcan (to Hamburger SV)
36	MF	GHA	Hans Nunoo Sarpei (on loan to Greuther Fürth)

=== Eintracht Frankfurt ===
In:

No.	Pos.	Nation	Player
13	DF	AUT	Martin Hinteregger (on loan from FC Augsburg)
17	MF	GER	Sebastian Rode (on loan from Borussia Dortmund)
18	DF	MLI	Almamy Touré (from Monaco)
30	MF	GER	Şahverdi Çetin (from Eintracht Frankfurt youth)
35	DF	BRA	Tuta (from São Paulo)
—	MF	GER	Nils Stendera (from Eintracht Frankfurt youth)
—	MF	GER	Patrick Finger (from Eintracht Frankfurt youth)

Out:

No.	Pos.	Nation	Player
13	DF	MEX	Carlos Salcedo (to Tigres UANL)
18	MF	POR	Francisco Geraldes (loan return to Sporting CP)
26	DF	GER	Deji-Ousman Beyreuther (on loan to Chemnitzer FC)
27	FW	GER	Nicolai Müller (on loan to Hannover 96)
29	GK	GER	Felix Wiedwald (on loan to MSV Duisburg)
35	DF	GER	Noel Knothe (on loan to Pipinsried)

=== Borussia Mönchengladbach ===
In:

No.	Pos.	Nation	Player

Out:

No.	Pos.	Nation	Player
22	MF	SVK	László Bénes (on loan to Holstein Kiel)

=== Hertha BSC ===
In:

No.	Pos.	Nation	Player

Out:

No.	Pos.	Nation	Player
7	MF	GER	Alexander Esswein (on loan to VfB Stuttgart)
26	MF	GER	Sidney Friede (on loan to Royal Excel Mouscron)
—	FW	RUS	Maximilian Pronichev (on loan to Hallescher FC, previously on loan at Erzgebirge Aue)

=== Werder Bremen ===
In:

No.	Pos.	Nation	Player
—	MF	AUT	Romano Schmid (from Red Bull Salzburg)

Out:

No.	Pos.	Nation	Player
3	DF	ITA	Luca Caldirola (to Benevento)
7	MF	AUT	Florian Kainz (to 1. FC Köln)
14	MF	GER	Ole Käuper (on loan to Erzgebirge Aue)
33	GK	CZE	Jaroslav Drobný (to Fortuna Düsseldorf)

=== FC Augsburg ===
In:

No.	Pos.	Nation	Player
5	DF	ENG	Reece Oxford (on loan from West Ham United)
33	GK	SUI	Gregor Kobel (on loan from 1899 Hoffenheim)
39	GK	GER	Benjamin Leneis (from FC Augsburg II)

Out:

No.	Pos.	Nation	Player
36	DF	AUT	Martin Hinteregger (on loan to Eintracht Frankfurt)

=== Hannover 96 ===
In:

No.	Pos.	Nation	Player
14	DF	GER	Kevin Akpoguma (on loan from 1899 Hoffenheim)
21	FW	GER	Nicolai Müller (on loan from Eintracht Frankfurt)

Out:

No.	Pos.	Nation	Player
1	GK	GER	Philipp Tschauner (on loan to FC Ingolstadt 04)

=== 1. FSV Mainz 05 ===
In:

No.	Pos.	Nation	Player

Out:

No.	Pos.	Nation	Player

=== SC Freiburg ===
In:

No.	Pos.	Nation	Player
32	MF	ITA	Vincenzo Grifo (on loan from 1899 Hoffenheim)

Out:

No.	Pos.	Nation	Player
14	MF	GER	Patrick Kammerbauer (on loan to Holstein Kiel)
33	MF	USA	Caleb Stanko (to Cincinnati)

=== VfL Wolfsburg ===
In:

No.	Pos.	Nation	Player

Out:

No.	Pos.	Nation	Player
5	DF	NED	Jeffrey Bruma (on loan to FC Schalke 04)
16	MF	POL	Jakub Błaszczykowski (released)
30	MF	GER	Paul Seguin (on loan to Greuther Fürth)
—	MF	NED	Riechedly Bazoer (on loan to Utrecht, previously on loan at Porto)

=== Fortuna Düsseldorf ===
In:

No.	Pos.	Nation	Player
14	DF	AUT	Markus Suttner (on loan from Brighton & Hove Albion)
40	GK	CZE	Jaroslav Drobný (from Werder Bremen)
—	FW	POL	Dawid Kownacki (on loan from Sampdoria)
—	DF	GER	Johannes Bühler (free agent)

Out:

No.	Pos.	Nation	Player
16	FW	NOR	Håvard Nielsen (on loan to MSV Duisburg)
18	DF	GER	Gökhan Gül (on loan to Wehen Wiesbaden)
27	MF	GER	Taylan Duman (to Borussia Dortmund II)
—	DF	GER	Johannes Bühler (on loan to VfR Aalen)

=== 1. FC Nürnberg ===
In:

No.	Pos.	Nation	Player
16	MF	CRO	Ivo Iličević (from Kairat)
38	MF	GER	Simon Rhein (from 1. FC Nürnberg II)

Out:

No.	Pos.	Nation	Player

== 2. Bundesliga ==
=== Hamburger SV ===
In:

No.	Pos.	Nation	Player
41	MF	TUR	Berkay Özcan (from VfB Stuttgart)

Out:

No.	Pos.	Nation	Player
13	MF	GER	Christoph Moritz (on loan to SV Darmstadt 98)
29	MF	GER	Matti Steinmann (on loan to Vendsyssel)

=== 1. FC Köln ===
In:

No.	Pos.	Nation	Player
8	MF	GER	Johannes Geis (from FC Schalke 04)
27	FW	FRA	Anthony Modeste (free agent)
30	MF	AUT	Florian Kainz (from Werder Bremen)

Out:

No.	Pos.	Nation	Player
11	FW	GER	Simon Zoller (to VfL Bochum)
19	FW	FRA	Serhou Guirassy (on loan to Amiens)
40	DF	GER	Yann Aurel Bisseck (on loan to Holstein Kiel)

=== Holstein Kiel ===
In:

No.	Pos.	Nation	Player
4	DF	GER	Yann Aurel Bisseck (on loan from 1. FC Köln)
17	MF	GER	Patrick Kammerbauer (on loan from SC Freiburg)
25	MF	SVK	László Bénes (on loan from Borussia Mönchengladbach)
38	FW	CMR	Franck Evina (on loan from Bayern Munich II)

Out:

No.	Pos.	Nation	Player
13	MF	GER	Dominic Peitz (to Mainz 05 II)
17	FW	GER	Steven Lewerenz (to 1. FC Magdeburg)
19	DF	GER	Patrick Herrmann (to SV Darmstadt 98)
30	FW	GER	Benjamin Girth (on loan to VfL Osnabrück)

=== Arminia Bielefeld ===
In:

No.	Pos.	Nation	Player
2	DF	GER	Amos Pieper (from Borussia Dortmund II)
15	MF	GER	Reinhold Yabo (from Red Bull Salzburg)

Out:

No.	Pos.	Nation	Player
17	FW	GER	Prince Osei Owusu (on loan to 1860 Munich)

=== Jahn Regensburg ===
In:

No.	Pos.	Nation	Player

Out:

No.	Pos.	Nation	Player
5	DF	GER	Dominic Volkmer (on loan to Carl Zeiss Jena)
13	MF	GER	Sven Kopp (to SpVgg Bayreuth)

=== VfL Bochum ===
In:

No.	Pos.	Nation	Player
9	FW	GER	Simon Zoller (from 1. FC Köln)
22	DF	AUT	Dominik Baumgartner (from Wacker Innsbruck)
36	MF	GER	Jan Wellers (from VfL Bochum youth)

Out:

No.	Pos.	Nation	Player
24	DF	GER	Timo Perthel (to 1. FC Magdeburg)
38	GK	GER	Florian Kraft (to Fortuna Köln)
—	FW	GRE	Vangelis Pavlidis (on loan to Willem II, previously on loan at Borussia Dortmund II)

=== MSV Duisburg ===
In:

No.	Pos.	Nation	Player
5	DF	SWE	Joseph Baffo (free agent)
28	FW	NOR	Håvard Nielsen (on loan from Fortuna Düsseldorf)
30	GK	GER	Felix Wiedwald (on loan from Eintracht Frankfurt)

Out:

No.	Pos.	Nation	Player
1	GK	IRI	Daniel Davari (to Rot-Weiß Oberhausen)
18	DF	GER	Thomas Blomeyer (on loan to Sportfreunde Lotte)

=== 1. FC Union Berlin ===
In:

No.	Pos.	Nation	Player
17	FW	POR	Carlos Mané (on loan from Sporting CP)
18	DF	GER	Nicolai Rapp (from Erzgebirge Aue)

Out:

No.	Pos.	Nation	Player
3	DF	AUT	Christoph Schösswendter (to Admira Wacker)
17	FW	SWE	Simon Hedlund (to Brøndby)
18	MF	GER	Kenny Prince Redondo (to Greuther Fürth)

=== FC Ingolstadt 04 ===
In:

No.	Pos.	Nation	Player
4	DF	DEN	Bjørn Paulsen (from Hammarby)
15	DF	ALB	Mërgim Mavraj (from Aris)
17	MF	TUR	Cenk Şahin (on loan from FC St. Pauli)
41	GK	GER	Philipp Tschauner (on loan from Hannover 96)

Out:

No.	Pos.	Nation	Player
13	FW	GER	Robert Leipertz (to 1. FC Heidenheim)
14	FW	NGR	Osayamen Osawe (to KFC Uerdingen 05)
27	FW	GER	Agyemang Diawusie (on loan to Wehen Wiesbaden)
35	FW	CUW	Charlison Benschop (on loan to De Graafschap)

=== SV Darmstadt 98 ===
In:

No.	Pos.	Nation	Player
14	MF	ISL	Victor Pálsson (from FC Zürich)
15	DF	GER	Mathias Wittek (from 1. FC Heidenheim)
23	FW	GER	Sören Bertram (from Erzgebirge Aue)
26	MF	GER	Christoph Moritz (on loan from Hamburger SV)
37	DF	GER	Patrick Herrmann (from Holstein Kiel)

Out:

No.	Pos.	Nation	Player
4	DF	TUR	Aytaç Sulu (to Samsunspor)
27	MF	USA	McKinze Gaines (on loan to FSV Zwickau)
—	FW	AUS	Jamie Maclaren (to Melbourne City, previously on loan at Hibernian)

=== SV Sandhausen ===
In:

No.	Pos.	Nation	Player
18	DF	GER	Dennis Diekmeier (free agent)
30	DF	GER	Sören Dieckmann (from Borussia Dortmund II)

Out:

No.	Pos.	Nation	Player
5	DF	GER	Marcel Seegert (to Waldhof Mannheim)
12	FW	GER	Florian Hansch (on loan to Wehen Wiesbaden)

=== FC St. Pauli ===
In:

No.	Pos.	Nation	Player
2	DF	POL	Jakub Bednarczyk (from Bayer Leverkusen)
7	MF	GER	Kevin Lankford (from 1. FC Heidenheim)
9	FW	GER	Alexander Meier (free agent)
22	DF	NED	Justin Hoogma (on loan from 1899 Hoffenheim)
38	DF	GER	Florian Carstens (from FC St. Pauli II)

Out:

No.	Pos.	Nation	Player
2	DF	GER	Clemens Schoppenhauer (to VfR Aalen)
7	MF	GER	Bernd Nehrig (to Eintracht Braunschweig)
22	MF	TUR	Cenk Şahin (on loan to FC Ingolstadt 04)

=== 1. FC Heidenheim ===
In:

No.	Pos.	Nation	Player
—	FW	GER	Robert Leipertz (from FC Ingolstadt 04)

Out:

No.	Pos.	Nation	Player
5	DF	GER	Mathias Wittek (to SV Darmstadt 98)
27	MF	GER	Kolja Pusch (on loan to Admira Wacker)
35	MF	GER	Kevin Lankford (to FC St. Pauli)

=== Dynamo Dresden ===
In:

No.	Pos.	Nation	Player
5	MF	GER	Dženis Burnić (on loan from Borussia Dortmund)

Out:

No.	Pos.	Nation	Player
16	DF	GER	Philip Heise (to Norwich City)

=== Greuther Fürth ===
In:

No.	Pos.	Nation	Player
14	MF	GHA	Hans Nunoo Sarpei (on loan from VfB Stuttgart)
27	MF	GER	Kenny Prince Redondo (from Union Berlin)
33	MF	GER	Paul Seguin (on loan from VfL Wolfsburg)

Out:

No.	Pos.	Nation	Player
7	MF	GER	Levent Ayçiçek (to Adana Demirspor)
19	DF	GER	Roberto Hilbert (to Greuther Fürth II)
25	GK	GER	Timo Königsmann (to VfR Aalen)
40	MF	GER	Patrick Sontheimer (on loan to Würzburger Kickers)

=== Erzgebirge Aue ===
In:

No.	Pos.	Nation	Player
3	DF	CZE	Jan Král (on loan from Mladá Boleslav)
13	MF	GER	Louis Samson (from FC Schalke 04 II)
14	MF	GER	Ole Käuper (on loan from Werder Bremen)
19	FW	AUT	Philipp Zulechner (free agent)

Out:

No.	Pos.	Nation	Player
6	DF	GER	Luke Hemmerich (on loan to Energie Cottbus)
14	FW	RUS	Maximilian Pronichev (loan return to Hertha BSC)
18	DF	GER	Nicolai Rapp (to Union Berlin)
23	FW	GER	Sören Bertram (to SV Darmstadt 98)
27	DF	GER	Sascha Härtel (on loan to Sportfreunde Lotte)
33	MF	GER	Christian Tiffert (to Hallescher FC)

=== 1. FC Magdeburg ===
In:

No.	Pos.	Nation	Player
1	GK	GEO	Giorgi Loria (free agent)
4	MF	GER	Jan Kirchhoff (free agent)
27	FW	GER	Steven Lewerenz (from Holstein Kiel)
29	DF	GER	Timo Perthel (from VfL Bochum)

Out:

No.	Pos.	Nation	Player
1	GK	BIH	Jasmin Fejzić (to Eintracht Braunschweig)
20	DF	GER	Joel Abu Hanna (on loan to Fortuna Köln)
25	FW	GER	Philipp Harant (on loan to Germania Halberstadt)
37	FW	GER	Mërgim Berisha (loan return to Red Bull Salzburg)

=== SC Paderborn 07 ===
In:

No.	Pos.	Nation	Player
9	FW	GER	Kai Pröger (from Rot-Weiss Essen)
14	FW	USA	Khiry Shelton (from Sporting Kansas City)
20	FW	LBR	Mohammed Kamara (from UCLA Bruins)
23	DF	GHA	Philimon Tawiah (from Tudu Mighty Jets)
—	FW	GER	Felix Drinkuth (from Eintracht Norderstedt)

Out:

No.	Pos.	Nation	Player
9	FW	GER	Julius Düker (on loan to Eintracht Braunschweig)
—	FW	GER	Felix Drinkuth (on loan to Sportfreunde Lotte)

== See also ==
- 2018–19 Bundesliga
- 2018–19 2. Bundesliga
