= Mert Kuyucu =

German footballer

Personal information
- Date of birth: 11 May 2000 (age 26)
- Place of birth: Germany
- Height: 1.83 m (6 ft 0 in)
- Position: Defender

Team information
- Current team: Somaspor
- Number: 58

Youth career
- –2018: FC St. Pauli

Senior career*
Years	Team	Apps	(Gls)
2018–2021	FC St. Pauli II	27	(2)
2019–2021	FC St. Pauli	2	(0)
2021–2022	1. FC Köln II	23	(1)
2022–2024	Manisa	2	(0)
2023	→ Karaman FK (loan)	10	(0)
2024–	Somaspor	9	(0)
- * Club domestic league appearances and goals as of 01:49, 4 July 2024 (UTC)

Mert Kuyucu (born 11 May 2000) is a German professional footballer who plays as a defender for Turkish TFF Second League club Somaspor.

== Career ==
Having made his debut for FC St. Pauli II in the 2018–19 season, he made his first team debut for FC St. Pauli on 8 December 2019, in a 1–0 defeat away at Jahn Regensburg.

== Personal life ==
Born in Germany, Kuyucu is of Turkish descent.

== Career statistics ==
As of 1 June 2021

Appearances and goals by club, season and competition
Club	Season	League			National cup		Other		Total	
Club	Season	Division	Apps	Goals	Apps	Goals	Apps	Goals	Apps	Goals
FC St. Pauli II	2018–19	Regionalliga Nord	1	0	—		0	0	1	0
FC St. Pauli II	2019–20	Regionalliga Nord	21	2	—		0	0	21	2
FC St. Pauli II	2020–21	Regionalliga Nord	5	0	—		0	0	5	0
FC St. Pauli II	Total		27	2	0	0	0	0	27	2
FC St. Pauli	2019–20	2. Bundesliga	2	0	0	0	0	0	2	0
Career total			29	2	0	0	0	0	29	2
