= Christopher Buchtmann =

German footballer (born 1992)

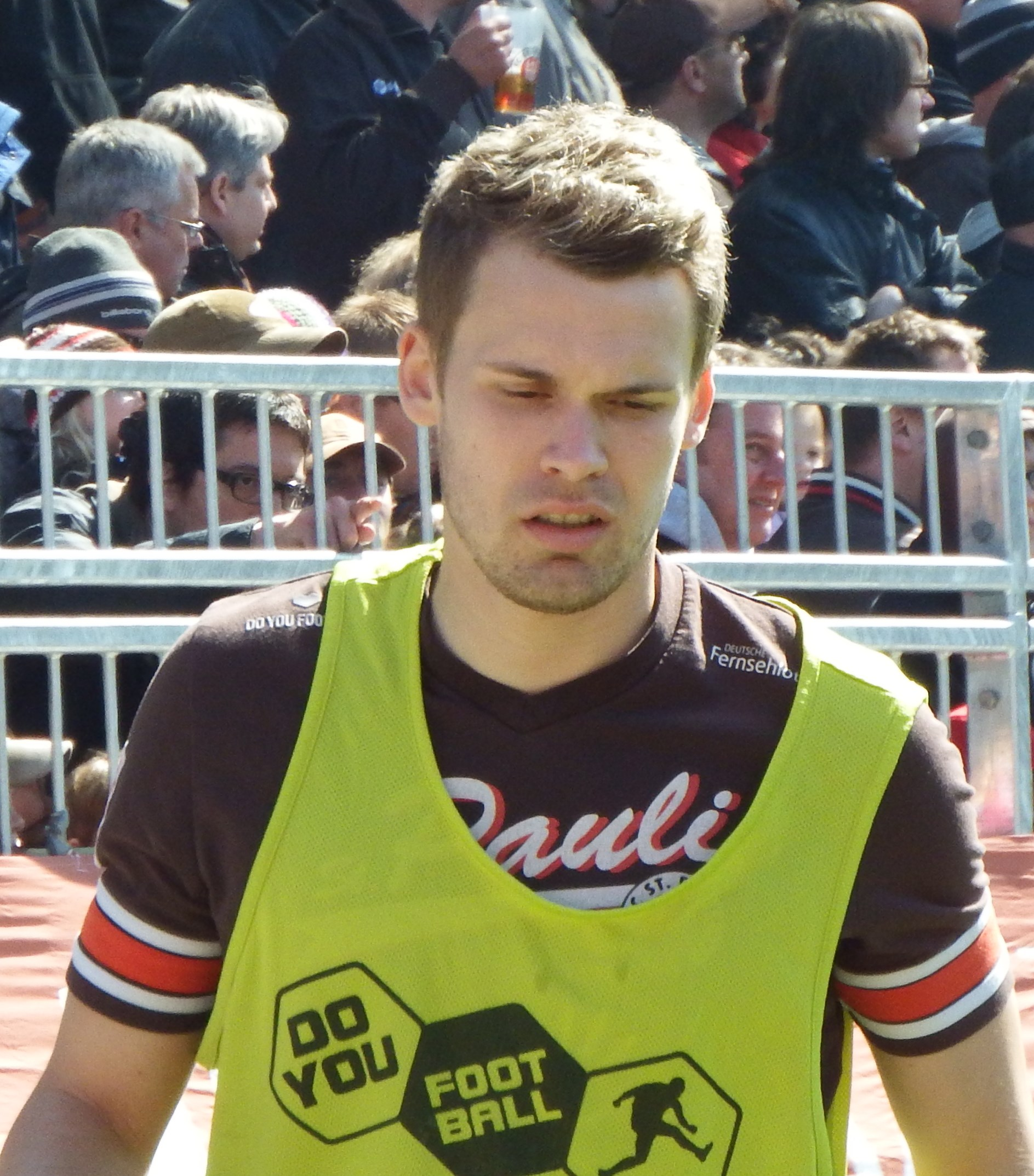
- Buchtmann with FC St. Pauli in 2013

Personal information
- Date of birth: 25 April 1992 (age 34)
- Place of birth: Hameln, Germany
- Height: 1.74 m (5 ft 9 in)
- Position: Attacking midfielder

Team information
- Current team: VfB Oldenburg
- Number: 10

Youth career
- –2007: Hannover 96
- 2007: Borussia Dortmund
- 2008: HSC/BW Tündern
- 2008–2009: Liverpool
- 2010: Fulham

Senior career*
Years	Team	Apps	(Gls)
2010–2012	1. FC Köln II	30	(2)
2010–2012	1. FC Köln	2	(0)
2012–2022	FC St. Pauli	190	(19)
2013–2015	FC St. Pauli II	7	(1)
2022–	VfB Oldenburg	36	(3)

International career^{‡}
2007	Germany U15	2	(0)
2007	Germany U16	2	(0)
2009	Germany U17	10	(1)
2009–2010	Germany U18	4	(0)
2010–2011	Germany U19	5	(3)
Medal record
Men's football
Representing Germany
UEFA European Under-17 Championship
Winner	2009 Germany
- * Club domestic league appearances and goals as of 12 September 2024 ‡ National team caps and goals as of 25 January 2017

Christopher Buchtmann (born 25 April 1992) is a German professional footballer who plays as an attacking midfielder for VfB Oldenburg. After playing youth football for various clubs in Germany and England, Buchtmann started his professional career with 1. FC Köln. In 2012 he transferred to FC St. Pauli, where he played for ten years before joining VfB Oldenburg. He has represented Germany internationally at various youth levels, having won the UEFA European Under-17 Championship in 2009.

== Club career ==
=== Early career ===
Buchtmann started his career at Hannover 96 before joining Borussia Dortmund when he was thirteen. He moved to England joining Liverpool youth academy. In February 2010, he left Liverpool for a reported transfer fee of £100,000 to join Fulham, where he was in the development squad after signing an 18-month contract.

However, after three months at the club, Buchtmann left Fulham to return to Germany and sign with 1. FC Köln. After two years of playing for the reserves, he made his debut for the relegated club, coming on as a substitute for Sławomir Peszko in the 68th minute as Köln lost 4–1 against Freiburg. He added another appearance in the last game of the season, in a 4–1 defeat to Bayern Munich.

In July, after a training camp in preparation of the 2012–13 season, Buchtmann was one of five players demoted to the reserve squad by coach Holger Stanislawski.

=== FC St. Pauli ===
In late August, Buchtmann left Köln to join FC St. Pauli after his contract with Köln was terminated. In January 2013, he signed a new contract with the club until 2015.

The 2013–14 season was a breakthrough for him, as he established himself in the first team. In late January, he signed a new contract with the club, which would keep him until 2016.

In March 2016, Buchtmann agreed to a contract extension until 2019.

=== VfB Oldenburg ===
Buchtmann joined 3. Liga side VfB Oldenburg in August 2022, having been released by FC St. Pauli after ten years with the club.

== International career ==
Buchtmann represented Germany internationally at youth level and played for the under 15, under 16, under 17, under 18, under 19 and under 20 national teams. He was part of the squad that won the UEFA European Under-17 Championship. As a result of his performance, Buchtmann was named by the UEFA as one of the most promising stars in the future.

== Career statistics ==
As of match played on 1 July 2022

Appearances and goals by club, season and competition
Club	Season	League			Cup		Total	
Club	Season	Division	Apps	Goals	Apps	Goals	Apps	Goals
1. FC Köln II	2010–11	Regionalliga West	19	1	—		19	1
1. FC Köln II	2011–12	Regionalliga West	11	1	—		11	1
1. FC Köln II	Total		30	2	—		30	2
1. FC Köln	2011–12	Bundesliga	2	0	0	0	2	0
FC St. Pauli	2012–13	2. Bundesliga	15	0	1	0	16	0
FC St. Pauli	2013–14	2. Bundesliga	27	0	1	0	28	0
FC St. Pauli	2014–15	2. Bundesliga	11	1	1	0	12	1
FC St. Pauli	2015–16	2. Bundesliga	30	1	0	0	30	1
FC St. Pauli	2016–17	2. Bundesliga	30	6	2	0	32	6
FC St. Pauli	2017–18	2. Bundesliga	17	4	1	0	18	4
FC St. Pauli	2018–19	2. Bundesliga	24	5	0	0	24	4
FC St. Pauli	2019–20	2. Bundesliga	12	0	1	0	13	0
FC St. Pauli	2020–21	2. Bundesliga	2	0	0	0	2	0
FC St. Pauli	2021–22	2. Bundesliga	22	2	2	1	24	3
FC St. Pauli	Total		190	19	9	1	199	20
FC St. Pauli II	2012–13	Regionalliga Nord	1	0	—		1	0
FC St. Pauli II	2014–15	Regionalliga Nord	6	1	—		6	1
FC St. Pauli II	Total		7	1	—		7	1
Career total			229	22	9	1	238	23
