= Ryō Miyaichi =

Japanese footballer (born 1992)

Ryō Miyaichi 宮市 亮
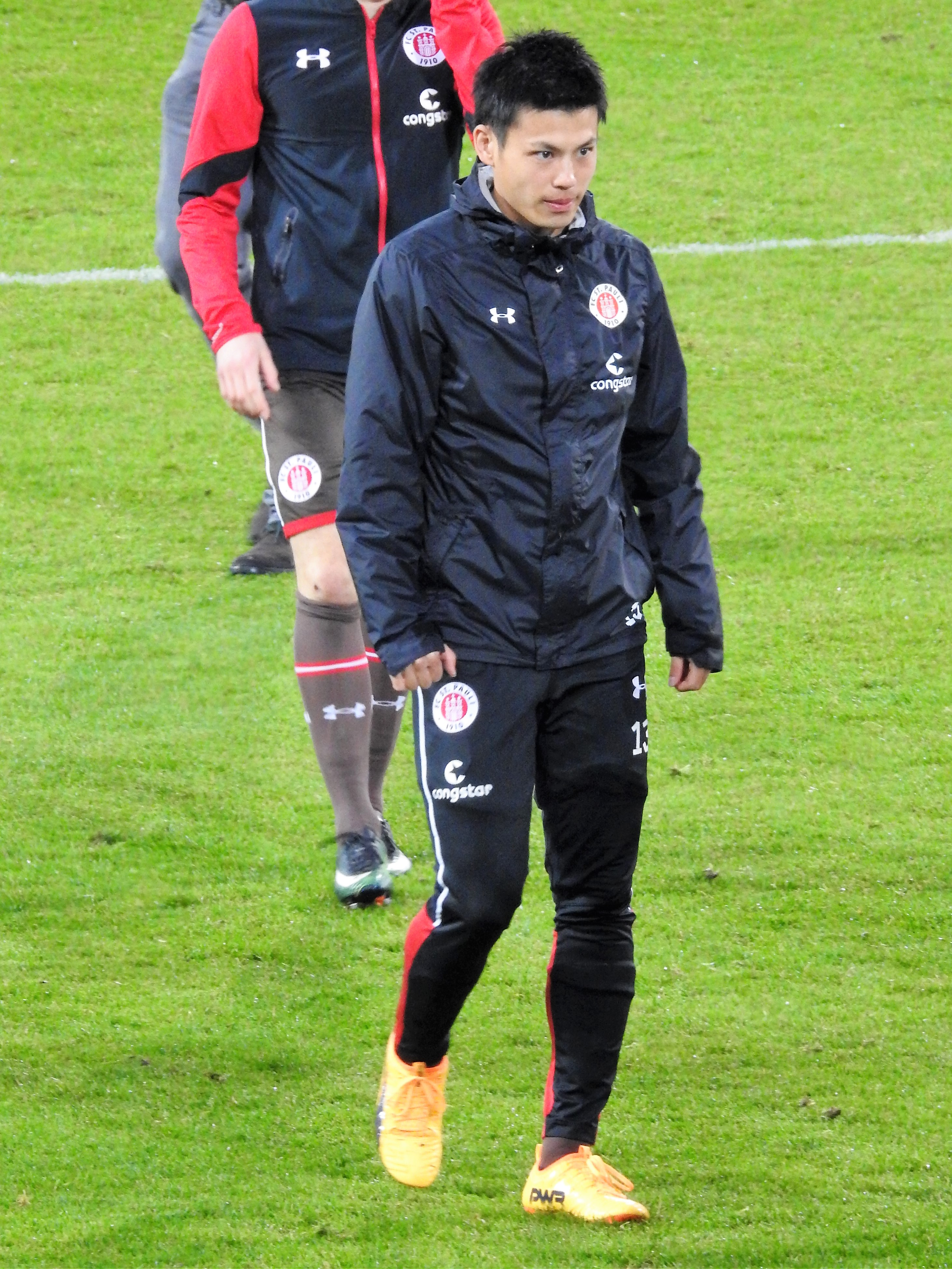
- Miyaichi with FC St. Pauli in 2017

Personal information
- Full name: Ryō Miyaichi
- Date of birth: 14 December 1992 (age 33)
- Place of birth: Okazaki, Aichi, Japan
- Height: 1.85 m (6 ft 1 in)
- Position: Winger

Team information
- Current team: Yokohama F. Marinos
- Number: 23

Youth career
- 2001–2008: Sylphid FC
- 2008–2010: Chukyo University Chukyo High School

Senior career*
Years	Team	Apps	(Gls)
2011–2015	Arsenal	1	(0)
2011	→ Feyenoord (loan)	12	(3)
2012	→ Bolton Wanderers (loan)	12	(0)
2012–2013	→ Wigan Athletic (loan)	4	(0)
2014–2015	→ Twente (loan)	10	(0)
2014–2015	→ Jong Twente (loan)	14	(3)
2015–2021	FC St. Pauli	77	(8)
2015–2019	→ FC St. Pauli II	6	(0)
2021–	Yokohama F. Marinos	104	(8)

International career^{‡}
2007	Japan U15	3	(2)
2008	Japan U16	3	(1)
2009	Japan U17	5	(2)
2010	Japan U19	8	(1)
2012–2022	Japan	5	(0)
Medal record
Men's football
Representing Japan
EAFF Championship
Winner	2022 Japan	Team
- * Club domestic league appearances and goals as of 11 August 2026 ‡ National team caps and goals as of 27 July 2022

Ryō Miyaichi (宮市 亮, Miyaichi Ryō; born 14 December 1992) is a Japanese professional footballer who plays as a winger for J1 League club Yokohama F. Marinos, and the Japan national team.

Miyaichi began his professional career at Arsenal after a successful trial in 2010. However, without a British work permit, he was loaned out to Eredivisie side Feyenoord where he made his professional debut in 2011 at age 17. In 2012, Miyaichi spent loan periods at fellow Premier League clubs, Bolton Wanderers and Wigan Athletic, helping win the FA Cup with the latter in 2013. After a long period ruled out with injury, Miyaichi returned to the Eredivisie, signing on loan to FC Twente in 2014. In June 2015, Miyaichi transferred to 2. Bundesliga side FC St. Pauli. In July 2021, Miyaichi returned to Japan, signing for Yokohama F. Marinos.

A full international for Japan, Miyaichi made his debut in 2012 against Azerbaijan and was part of the Japan side that won the East Asian Football Championship in 2022.

Once regarded as one of the best youth prospects in world football, Miyaichi's career has been plagued with injuries, missing over 150 senior matches in his career.

== Early life ==
Miyaichi was born into a sporting family. His brother, Tsuyoshi, was also a football player; and his father, Tatsuya Nomoura, was a basketball player who played for and later managed the Toyota Motors basketball club. Miyaichi started playing football in his elementary school years at Sylphid F.C. in Nagoya. He entered Chukyo University Chukyo High School and played for the school football club. In the 2010 season, the team advanced to the All Japan High School Soccer Tournament but were defeated in the first round in a match televised across Japan.

== Club career ==
=== Arsenal ===
During his trial at Arsenal in the summer of 2010, Miyaichi impressed the Arsenal manager, Arsène Wenger, signing a professional contract on 31 January 2011. Wenger said: "We’re delighted that Ryō Miyaichi has joined us. He trialed with us in the summer and has raw ability which has attracted many clubs around the world".

==== Loan to Feyenoord ====
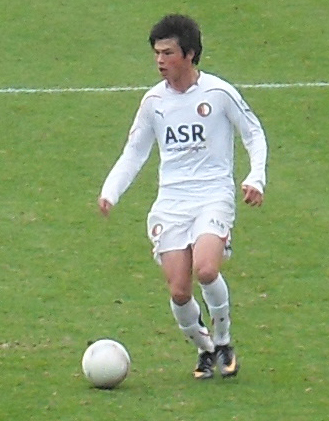
Miyaichi in action for Feyenoord in 2011.

Just after he signed for Arsenal, it was announced that he was set to join Feyenoord on loan. On 5 February, in his first appearance for Feyenoord, he played the full 90 minutes against Vitesse Arnhem in a 1–1 draw, and was named man of the match. Miyaichi then played against Heracles Almelo where he scored the opening goal and created the second in a 2–1 league win for Feyenoord. On 17 April 2011, Miyaichi scored two goals and contributed two assists in Feyenoord's 6–1 victory over Willem II, leading a revival after Feyenoord had conceded an early goal.

The Dutch media gave him the nickname "Ryodinho" after comparisons to Ronaldinho. He has also been branded the Japanese Messi.

==== 2011–12 season ====
As he returned to Arsenal after his loan spell at Feyenoord, Miyaichi joined up with the first team for pre-season training. He was included in the 23-man squad to tour Asia in the pre-season after impressing in training. Miyaichi made his pre-season debut against Malaysia All-Stars XI, he started the match before being substituted for Robin van Persie in the 66th minute.

On 9 August 2011, Miyaichi was granted a work permit to play for Arsenal on the grounds of being an "exceptional talent" in view of evidence supplied by Wenger and the Japan Football Association, and was deemed free to represent Arsenal during the 2011–12 season. He was also included in Arsenal's 23-man Champions League squad for the fixture against Udinese. On 23 August 2011, Miyaichi featured in the Arsenal Reserves against Wigan Athletic Reserves and scored in the 83rd minute.

On 20 September 2011, Miyaichi made his first team debut against League Two side Shrewsbury Town in the League Cup third round as a 71st-minute substitute. He also came on again in the League Cup as a substitute as Arsenal went on to win the match 2–1 against Bolton Wanderers.

During the reserve match against Fulham, on 7 November 2011, Miyaichi lasted 34 minutes before being forced off with an ankle injury, which would cause him to be out for weeks. Despite being in the first team, Miyaichi admitted he still has a lot to learn.

==== Loan to Bolton Wanderers ====
On 31 January 2012, Miyaichi joined Bolton Wanderers on loan until the end of the season. Shortly after arriving at Bolton, manager Owen Coyle spoke of his admiration for the young player, even though Miyaichi had yet to play in a competitive match for the team. He played a behind-closed-doors game on 7 February against Preston North End where he scored the only goal in a 1–0 win and made his full debut when coming on as a half-time substitute for Martin Petrov in Bolton's 2–1 home defeat by Wigan Athletic on 11 February. He made his first start, and scored his first goal, the following weekend in Bolton's 2–0 FA Cup win at Millwall. He played 78 minutes of the game before being substituted. He made his first Premier League start the following weekend in Bolton's 3–0 loss at Chelsea. He was voted February Player of the Month by the Bolton fans after his debut.

==== Loan to Wigan Athletic ====
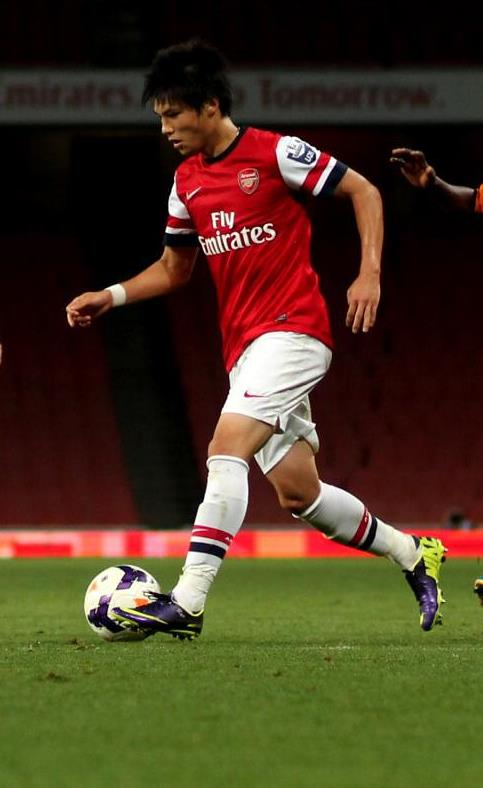
Miyaichi during an Arsenal Reserves match against Wolverhampton on 7 October 2013.

On 13 August 2012, Arsenal confirmed that Miyaichi had joined Wigan Athletic on a season-long loan. On 28 August 2012, he made his debut as a substitute in a 4–1 League Cup victory over Nottingham Forest. During his first game for the club he was able to provide an assist for Callum McManaman. He went on to make his league debut on 1 September in a 2–2 draw with Stoke City. On 9 March, he made his return as a substitute for Callum McManaman in a 3–0 FA Cup quarter final win away to Everton. Miyaichi picked up injury during the game which saw him sidelined for the rest of the season. He thus missed the rest of Wigan's historic cup run where they went on to lift the 2013 FA Cup.

==== Return to Arsenal ====
Miyachi made an early return to the Emirates from his loan move at Wigan due to injury. On 22 July 2013, Miyaichi scored his first goal for Arsenal in a friendly against Nagoya Grampus during Arsenal's pre-season Asia tour, scoring a penalty-kick in the 26th minute. He went on to make his UEFA Champions League debut on 28 August 2013 in a 2–0 win over Fenerbahçe.

==== Loan to FC Twente ====
Despite interest from former club Feynoord and SC Heerenveen, upon 1 September 2014 Miyaichi was sent on a season long loan to fellow Dutch side FC Twente. During that season he made 10 appearances in the Eredivisie with the club's first team. Miyaichi also played 14 Jupiler League games with Jong Twente, scoring three goals and delivering one assist. He returned to Arsenal at the end of the season when his five-year stay at the North London club was brought to an end.

=== FC St. Pauli ===
On 18 June 2015, the Hamburger Morgenpost announced that Miyaichi had signed a three-year contract with FC St. Pauli in the 2. Bundesliga, describing the winger as a player with "huge potential". Miyaichi's transfer was confirmed on the club's website the next day, where it was revealed that he would wear the number 13 shirt for the upcoming season.

One week before the 2015-16 league campaign began, Miyaichi tore a cruciate ligament in his left knee in the final warm-up game against Rayo Vallecano, an injury that meant he did not make his competitive debut until nine months later in a home game against Union Berlin in April 2016. On 15 May 2016, Miyaichi scored a brace in St. Pauli's 5-2 win over FC Kaiserslautern. In preparations for the 2017-18 season, Miyaichi had another major set back, suffering from another cruciate ligament tear, this time to his right knee. On 27 May 2021, it was announced on the club website that Miyaichi would be leaving the club after six years. Miyaichi's time at FC St. Pauli was plagued by injury, he managed 80 appearances for the club over six seasons.

=== Yokohama F. Marinos ===
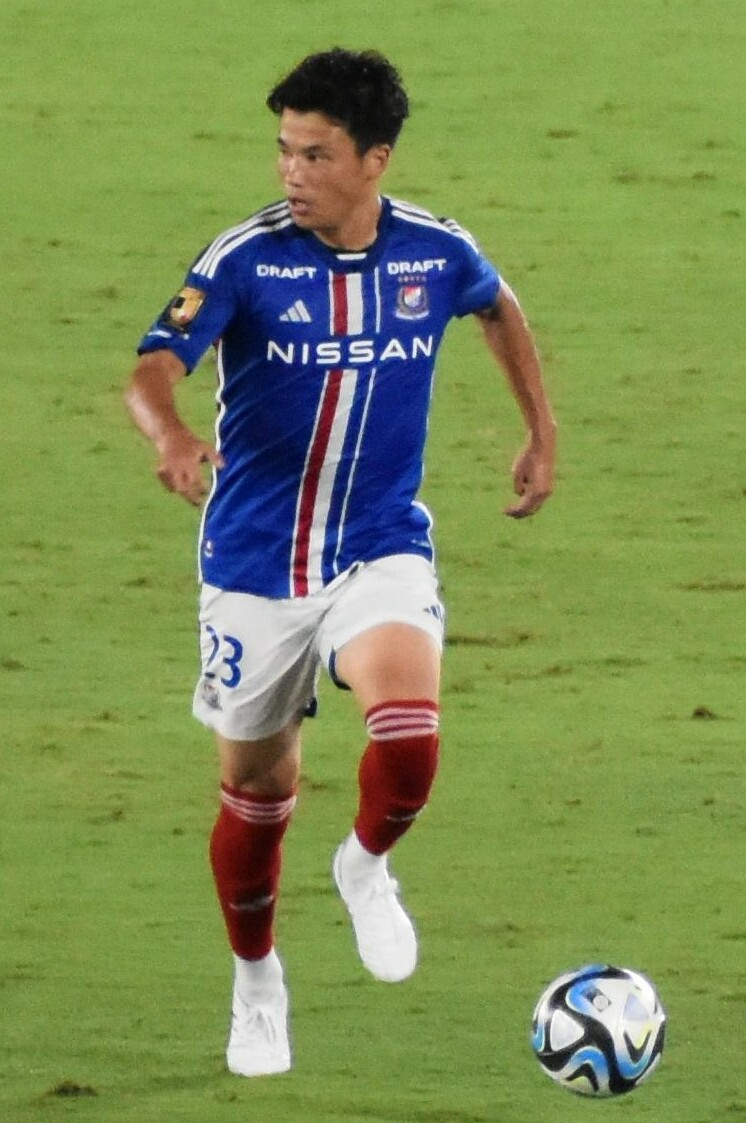
Miyaichi with Yokohama F. Marinos in 2023.

On 5 July 2021, after having spent his entire senior career in Europe, Miyaichi returned to his native Japan, signing for Yokohama F. Marinos in the J1 League. Miyaichi was assigned the number 17 shirt and on 18 September 2021, he made his debut against Nagoya Grampus, coming on as a substitute in the 55th minute. Miyaichi only made one more appearance for Yokohama during the 2021 season, struggling with injury as they ended the season J1 League runners-up to Kawasaki Frontale.

On 16 April 2022, Miyaichi made his AFC Champions League debut against Vietnamese champions HAGL, playing the full 90 minutes as Yokohama won 2-1. On 18 May 2022, Miyachi scored and assisted in an impressive performance against Urawa Red Diamonds, the match ended as a 3-3 draw but marked Miyaichi's first goal and assist for the club. A week later, Miyaichi's form continued, assisting twice against Kyoto Sanga before being substituted in the 74th minute. On 2 July 2022, Miyaichi scored a late goal against Shimizu S-Pulse after coming on as a substitute, as Yokohama secured a 5-3 away victory. Four days later, Miyaichi made an impact off the bench again, scoring another late goal against Sanfrecce Hiroshima in a match that ended 3-0 to Yokohama. Miyaichi's performances during the season saw him earn a re-call to the Japan national team after almost a decade since his last international appearance in 2012. Miyaichi suffered another anterior cruciate ligament rupture in his right knee during Japan's final EAFF E-1 Football Championship match against South Korea and will miss out the rest of the season following surgery. Yokohama finished the 2022 J1 League season as champions, with Miyaichi selected as one of the players to lift the trophy.

Miyaichi returned as a substitute in the 2023 J.League Cup Group A match against Hokkaido Consadole Sapporo on 24 May 2023. On 10 June, Miyaichi scored his first league goal of the 2023 season against Kashiwa Reysol in the 97th minute to win the match 4-3 after coming on as a substitute.

== Style of play ==
A technically gifted player, Miyaichi plays as a winger and has been noted for his blistering pace and ability to run and dribble past defenders. Japan's former manager Alberto Zaccheroni has said that "Miyaichi's strengths are on the flanks and creating space going forward."

Arsène Wenger has stated that "Ryō has natural technical ability. He has good balance and phenomenal pace, and his passing and crossing is consistently of a high quality. He is a very exciting player."

Former Feyenoord director, Eric Gudde praised Miyaichi saying that "He is a player with good pace, dribbling and a lot of tricks to get behind the opponent. He has some excellent qualities and for his age is a very complete player."

== International career ==
Miyaichi has represented Japan from under-15 to under-19 level. He took part in the 2009 U-17 World Cup as a member of Japan U-17 national team. He played 2 matches at the tournament.

Miyaichi received his first call up to the senior team for the 2014 World Cup qualification against Uzbekistan in February 2012, though he didn't feature in the game.

Miyaichi made his debut on 23 May 2012 in a friendly against Azerbaijan where he came on as a 60th-minute substitute in a game that ended 2–0 to Japan. He made his second appearance against Brazil to again play as a substitute in a 4–0 Japan loss.

After almost decade since his last international cap, Miyaichi was called up to the Japan national team on 14 July 2022 ahead of the 2022 EAFF E-1 Football Championship finals hosted in Japan. On 19 July, Miyaichi came on as a substitute in the 64th minute, helping secure Japan's 6-0 victory over Hong Kong. On 24 July, Miyaichi made his first start for Japan in a 0-0 draw against rivals China, before being substituted in the 75th minute. On 27 July, Miyaichi came on as a substitute in the 59th minute in the final match against South Korea but was forced off in the 78th minute due to injury. Japan won the match 3-0 and clinched the championship with two wins and one draw.

== Career statistics ==
=== Club ===
As of match played 6 March 2024

Appearances and goals by club, season and competition
Club	Season	League			National cup (Note: Includes FA Cup, KNVB Cup, DFB-Pokal, Emperor's Cup)		League cup (Note: Includes Football League Cup, J.League Cup)		Continental		Total	
Club	Season	Division	Apps	Goals	Apps	Goals	Apps	Goals	Apps	Goals	Apps	Goals
Arsenal	2010–11	Premier League	0	0	0	0	0	0	0	0	0	0
Arsenal	2011–12	Premier League	0	0	0	0	2	0	0	0	2	0
Arsenal	2012–13	Premier League	0	0	0	0	0	0	0	0	0	0
Arsenal	2013–14	Premier League	1	0	0	0	2	0	2 (Note: Appearances in UEFA Champions League)	0	5	0
Arsenal	Total		1	0	0	0	4	0	2	0	7	0
Feyenoord (loan)	2010–11	Eredivisie	12	3	–		–		–		12	3
Bolton Wanderers (loan)	2011–12	Premier League	12	0	2	1	–		–		14	1
Wigan Athletic (loan)	2012–13	Premier League	4	0	1	0	2	0	–		7	0
Twente (loan)	2014–15	Eredivisie	10	0	1	0	–		–		11	0
Jong FC Twente (loan)	2014–15	Eerste Divisie	14	3	–		–		–		14	3
FC St. Pauli	2015–16	2. Bundesliga	5	2	0	0	–		–		5	2
FC St. Pauli	2016–17	2. Bundesliga	17	0	2	0	–		–		19	0
FC St. Pauli	2017–18	2. Bundesliga	0	0	0	0	–		–		0	0
FC St. Pauli	2018–19	2. Bundesliga	25	5	0	0	–		–		25	5
FC St. Pauli	2019–20	2. Bundesliga	29	1	1	0	–		–		30	1
FC St. Pauli	2020–21	2. Bundesliga	1	0	0	0	–		–		1	0
FC St. Pauli	Total		77	8	3	0	–		–		80	8
FC St. Pauli II	2016–17	Regionalliga	1	0	–		–		–		1	0
FC St. Pauli II	2017–18	Regionalliga	1	0	–		–		–		1	0
FC St. Pauli II	2018–19	Regionalliga	4	0	–		–		–		4	0
FC St. Pauli II	Total		6	0	–		–		–		6	0
Yokohama F. Marinos	2021	J1 League	2	0	–		–		–		2	0
Yokohama F. Marinos	2022	J1 League	15	3	2	0	0	0	4 (Note: Appearances in AFC Champions League)	0	21	3
Yokohama F. Marinos	2023	J1 League	18	2	2	1	6	1	6	1	32	5
Yokohama F. Marinos	2024	J1 League	2	0	0	0	0	0	0	0	2	0
Yokohama F. Marinos	Total		37	5	4	1	6	1	10	1	58	8
Career total			173	19	11	2	12	1	12	1	208	23

=== International ===
As of 7 November 2022

Appearances and goals by national team and year
National team	Year	Apps	Goals
Japan	2012	2	0
Japan	2022	3	0
Total		5	0

== Honours ==
=== Club ===
Wigan Athletic

- FA Cup: 2012–13

Arsenal

- FA Cup: 2013–14

Yokohama F. Marinos

- J1 League: 2022

=== International ===
- EAFF E-1 Football Championship: 2022

=== Individual ===
- Bolton Wanderers Player of the Month: February 2012
