= Marvin Knoll =

German footballer

Personal information
- Date of birth: 5 February 1990 (age 36)
- Place of birth: Berlin, Germany
- Height: 1.86 m (6 ft 1 in)
- Position: Midfielder

Youth career
- Spandauer SC Teutonia
- Schwarz-Weiß Spandau
- 1. FC Spandau
- –2004: SC Staaken
- 2004–2010: Hertha BSC

Senior career*
Years	Team	Apps	(Gls)
2008–2013	Hertha BSC II	80	(21)
2010–2013	Hertha BSC	8	(1)
2011–2012	→ Dynamo Dresden (loan)	11	(1)
2013–2015	SV Sandhausen	10	(0)
2015–2018	Jahn Regensburg	108	(11)
2016	Jahn Regensburg II	1	(0)
2018–2022	FC St. Pauli	68	(4)
2022–2024	MSV Duisburg	58	(2)

International career
2005–2006	Germany U16	6	(0)
2007	Germany U17	15	(7)
2010–2011	Germany U20	5	(0)
- * Club domestic league appearances and goals as of 14:55, 12 May 2024 (UTC)

Marvin Knoll (born 5 February 1990) is a German professional footballer who plays as a midfielder.

== Career ==
Knoll made his professional debut for Hertha BSC's first team in German second division on 5 December 2010, following injuries to Raffael and Fanol Perdedaj, coming on as a substitute for fellow debutant Alfredo Morales. At the beginning of the 2011–12 season he was loaned for one year to Dynamo Dresden.

In July 2013, after being released by Hertha BSC, he moved to SV Sandhausen.

He joined Jahn Regensburg on a free transfer in January 2015.

In May 2018, FC St. Pauli announced Knoll would join the club for the 2018–19 season, and the transfer fee paid to Regensburg was undisclosed. After three years at St. Pauli, he left them and moved to MSV Duisburg in January 2022.

== Career statistics ==
As of 12 May 2024

Appearances and goals by club, season and competition
Club	Season	Division	League		Cup		Other		Total	
Club	Season	Division	Apps	Goals	Apps	Goals	Apps	Goals	Apps	Goals
Hertha BSC II	2008–09	Regionalliga Nord	8	0	—		—		8	0
Hertha BSC II	2009–10	Regionalliga Nord	31	9	—		—		31	9
Hertha BSC II	2010–11	Regionalliga Nord	28	8	—		—		28	8
Hertha BSC II	2012–13	Regionalliga Nord	13	4	—		—		13	4
Hertha BSC II	Total		80	21	—		—		80	21
Hertha BSC	2010–11	2. Bundesliga	2	0	—		—		2	0
Hertha BSC	2012–13	2. Bundesliga	6	1	—		—		6	1
Hertha BSC	Total		8	1	—		—		8	1
Dynamo Dresden (loan)	2011–12	2. Bundesliga	11	1	1	0	—		12	1
SV Sandhausen	2013–14	2. Bundesliga	9	0	1	0	—		10	0
SV Sandhausen	2014–15	2. Bundesliga	1	0	—		—		1	0
SV Sandhausen	Total		10	0	1	0	—		11	0
Jahn Regensburg	2014–15	3. Liga	15	1	—		—		15	1
Jahn Regensburg	2015–16	Regionalliga Bayern	24	2	—		2 (Note: Appearances in promotion playoff)	0	26	2
Jahn Regensburg	2016–17	3. Liga	37	1	1	0	2	0	40	1
Jahn Regensburg	2017–18	2. Bundesliga	32	7	2	0	—		34	7
Jahn Regensburg	Total		108	11	3	0	4	0	115	11
Jahn Regensburg II	2015–16	Oberliga	1	0	—		—		1	0
FC St. Pauli	2018–19	2. Bundesliga	30	4	1	0	—		31	4
FC St. Pauli	2019–20	2. Bundesliga	24	0	2	1	—		26	1
FC St. Pauli	2020–21	2. Bundesliga	14	0	1	0	—		15	1
FC St. Pauli	Total		68	4	4	1	—		72	5
MSV Duisburg	2021–22	3. Liga	18	0	—		—		18	0
MSV Duisburg	2022–23	3. Liga	9	1	—		—		9	1
MSV Duisburg	2023–24	3. Liga	31	1	—		—		31	1
MSV Duisburg	Total		58	2	0	0	—		58	2
Career total			344	40	9	1	4	0	357	41
