= Felix Drinkuth =

German footballer

Personal information
- Full name: Felix Werner Wolfgang Drinkuth
- Date of birth: 20 October 1994 (age 32)
- Place of birth: Henstedt-Ulzburg, Germany
- Height: 1.85 m (6 ft 1 in)
- Position: Right winger

Team information
- Current team: VfB Lübeck
- Number: 17

Youth career
- –2009: Eintracht Norderstedt
- 2009–2013: FC St. Pauli

Senior career*
| Years | Team | Apps | (Gls) |
| 2013–2014 | FC St. Pauli II | 32 | (2) |
| 2014–2016 | Eintracht Braunschweig II | 62 | (13) |
| 2016–2019 | Eintracht Norderstedt | 83 | (33) |
| 2019–2020 | SC Paderborn | 0 | (0) |
| 2019 | → Sportfreunde Lotte (loan) | 16 | (0) |
| 2019–2020 | → Hallescher FC (loan) | 27 | (2) |
| 2020–2021 | FSV Zwickau | 29 | (3) |
| 2021–2022 | Carl Zeiss Jena | 15 | (2) |
| 2022–2025 | VfB Lübeck | 65 | (25) |
| 2025 | Eintracht Norderstedt | 10 | (2) |
| 2026– | VfB Lübeck | 5 | (1) |
- * Club domestic league appearances and goals as of 20 June 2026

Felix Werner Wolfgang Drinkuth (born 20 October 1994) is a German professional footballer who plays as a right winger for VfB Lübeck.

== Career ==
In January 2019, Drinkuth joined 2. Bundesliga club SC Paderborn from Eintracht Norderstedt, before immediately being loaned out to Sportfreunde Lotte in the 3. Liga for the remainder of the season.

Drinkuth made his professional debut for Sportfreunde Lotte in the 3. Liga on 25 January 2019, coming on as a substitute in the 85th minute for Maximilian Oesterhelweg in the 1–1 home draw against 1860 Munich.

On 26 July 2019, Drinkuth was loaned out to Hallescher FC until the end of 2019–20 season. On 24 July 2019, Drinkuth joined FSV Zwickau on a 1-year deal.

== Personal life ==
Drinkuth's uncle, Reenald Koch, is a former professional footballer who played for FC St. Pauli and Altona 93, and is the president of Eintracht Norderstedt. Drinkuth's cousin Philipp Koch (Reenald's son) is also a footballer for Eintracht Norderstedt, where they played alongside each other from 2016 until 2019.

== Honours ==
FC Eintracht Norderstedt 03

- Hamburg Cup: 2016–17
