= Niklas Hoffmann =

German footballer (born 1997)

Personal information
- Date of birth: 9 April 1997 (age 29)
- Place of birth: Landau, Germany
- Height: 1.94 m (6 ft 4 in)
- Positions: Centre-back; defensive midfielder

Team information
- Current team: 1. FC Köln II
- Number: 6

Youth career
- –2007: TSV Fortuna Billigheim-Ingenheim
- 2007–2016: Karlsruher SC

Senior career*
Years	Team	Apps	(Gls)
2015–2017	Karlsruher SC II	23	(0)
2016–2017	Karlsruher SC	0	(0)
2017–2019	SC Freiburg II	25	(2)
2019–2020	FC St. Pauli II	16	(0)
2019–2020	FC St. Pauli	5	(0)
2020–2022	Würzburger Kickers	43	(1)
2022–2024	SV Horn	44	(4)
2024–2026	Waldhof Mannheim	49	(2)
2026–	1. FC Köln II	9	(0)
- * Club domestic league appearances and goals as of 23 September 2026

Niklas Hoffmann (born 9 April 1997) is a German professional footballer who plays as a defensive midfielder for Regionalliga West side 1. FC Köln II.

== Career ==
Born in Landau, Rhineland-Palatinate, Hoffmann began playing football at TSV Fortuna Billigheim-Ingenheim in Südliche Weinstraße. At age 10, he joined the youth academy of Karlsruher SC after impressing at a youth tournament.

Hoffmann played with the youth teams of Karlsruhe in the Under 17 and Under 19 Bundesliga, as he led the U19s as team captain during his final season in that age group. During this time, he had already been selected for the first-team squad five times and once for the second team. In June 2016, he signed a three-year professional contract.

Failing to break through to the first team, Hoffmann moved to SC Freiburg in the summer of 2017, where he competed in the second team in the Regionalliga Südwest. Hoffmann ended the 2017–18 season in fourth place in the league with Freiburg II.

In the winter break of the following season, Hoffmann was signed by FC St. Pauli. As part of their second team, he successfully avoided relegation from the Regionalliga Nord. After the defender was able to make his debut for the first team in a first round win in the DFB-Pokal over VfB Lübeck in June 2019, head coach Jos Luhukay utilised him increasingly in the 2. Bundesliga due to injuries to regular starters.

After five 2. Bundesliga and 15 Regionalliga appearances for the Kiezkicker, Hoffmann moved to 3. Liga side Würzburger Kickers in late January 2020. There, he received a contract valid until 30 June 2021, with an option for an additional year.

Following Würzburger Kickers' relegation to the Regionalliga Bayern in the 2022–23 season, Hoffmann joined Austrian Second League club SV Horn on 2 July 2022.

On 22 May 2024, Hoffmann agreed to return to Germany and join Waldhof Mannheim in 3. Liga.

On 19 June 2026, Hoffmann signed with 1. FC Köln II in Regionalliga, the reserve side of 1. FC Köln.

== Honours ==
Würzburger Kickers

- 3. Liga runners-up: 2019–20
