= Luis Coordes =

Dominican Republic footballer (b. 1999)

Personal information
- Full name: Luis Ángel Núñez Coordes
- Date of birth: 2 January 1999 (age 27)
- Place of birth: Santo Domingo, Dominican Republic
- Height: 1.81 m (5 ft 11 in)
- Position: Midfielder

Team information
- Current team: VfB Lübeck
- Number: 11

Youth career
- VfL Lüneburg
- –2009: Eintracht Norderstedt
- 2009–2015: Hamburger SV
- 2015: MTV Treubund Lüneburg
- 2016–2018: FC St. Pauli

Senior career*
Years	Team	Apps	(Gls)
2018–2022	FC St. Pauli II	34	(2)
2019–2022	FC St. Pauli	13	(0)
2022	VfB Stuttgart II	10	(0)
2022–2024	FC Teutonia Ottensen	28	(0)
2024–2025	Eintracht Norderstedt	15	(1)
2026–	VfB Lübeck	7	(0)

International career
2021–	Dominican Republic	1	(0)
- * Club domestic league appearances and goals as of 22 September 2026

Luis Ángel Núñez Coordes (born 2 January 1999), known as Luis Coordes, is a Dominican professional footballer who plays as a midfielder for German club VfB Lübeck and the Dominican Republic national team.

== Club career ==
Coordes signed his first professional contract with FC St. Pauli on 30 June 2017, which began at the start of the 2018–19 season. He made his professional debut for St. Pauli in the 2. Bundesliga on 12 May 2019, coming on as a substitute for Jan-Philipp Kalla in the 61st minute of the 0–0 home draw against VfL Bochum.

On 27 January 2022, Coordes joined VfB Stuttgart II.

== International career ==
On 23 February 2021, Coordes was named to the Dominican Republic national under-23 football team preliminary squad for the 2020 CONCACAF Men's Olympic Qualifying Championship. However, he did not make the final squad as he was instead called up by the Dominican Republic at senior level for two 2022 FIFA World Cup qualification – CONCACAF first round matches against Dominica and Anguilla on 24 and 27 March 2021, respectively.

== Personal life ==
Born in the Dominican Republic, Coordes moved to Germany at a young age.
