= Ersin Zehir =

German-Turkish footballer

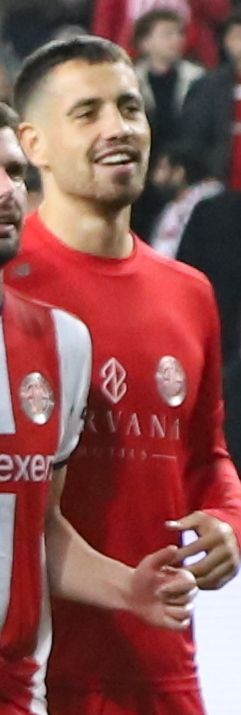
- Zehir in 2021

Personal information
- Date of birth: 15 January 1998 (age 28)
- Place of birth: Lübeck, Germany
- Height: 1.80 m (5 ft 11 in)
- Position: Midfielder

Team information
- Current team: SV Meppen
- Number: 6

Youth career
- SC Rapid Lübeck
- –2007: Türkischer SV Lübeck
- 2007–2014: VfB Lübeck
- 2014–2017: FC St. Pauli

Senior career*
Years	Team	Apps	(Gls)
2017–2020	FC St. Pauli II	41	(6)
2018–2021	FC St. Pauli	21	(0)
2020–2021	→ VfB Lübeck (loan)	30	(6)
2021–2022	Antalyaspor	2	(0)
2022	→ Dordrecht (loan)	16	(1)
2022	Tuzlaspor	0	(0)
2023	Eintracht Trier	10	(1)
2023–2025	Eintracht Norderstedt	65	(7)
2025–	SV Meppen	32	(4)
- * Club domestic league appearances and goals as of 20 June 2026

Ersin Zehir (born 15 January 1998) is a German-Turkish professional footballer who plays as a midfielder for Regionalliga Nord club SV Meppen.

== Career ==
=== FC St. Pauli ===
In June 2021, after his return from a loan at 3. Liga club VfB Lübeck, Zehir agreed the termination of his contract with FC St. Pauli. He made 21 appearances in the 2. Bundesliga for FC St. Pauli.

=== Antalyaspor ===
Following his departure from FC St. Pauli, Zehir moved to Antalyaspor. He made his debut for the club in a Turkish Cup win over Diyarbakırspor on 28 October 2021, coming on as a half-time substitute for Fyodor Kudryashov in a 5–0 win. His league debut followed on 6 November in a 1–0 victory against Altay, coming off the bench in injury time.

==== Loan to Dordrecht ====
He joined Dutch side FC Dordrecht, placed last in the Eerste Divisie, on loan in January 2022. He signed a contract until the end of the 2021–22 season with the option of a further season. Zehin made his Dordrecht debut in a 2–0 victory against Jong AZ. In his second match on 21 January, he scored his first goal in 4–0 win at Jong FC Utrecht; a hard shot in the top corner.

=== Eintracht Trier ===
On 20 January 2023, Zehir signed for Regionalliga Südwest club Eintracht Trier on a contract until the end of the season.

=== Eintracht Norderstedt ===
On 2 June 2023, Eintracht Norderstedt announced the signing of Zehir, from the upcoming season, on a contract until 30 June 2025.
