= Justin Hoogma =

Dutch footballer (born 1998)

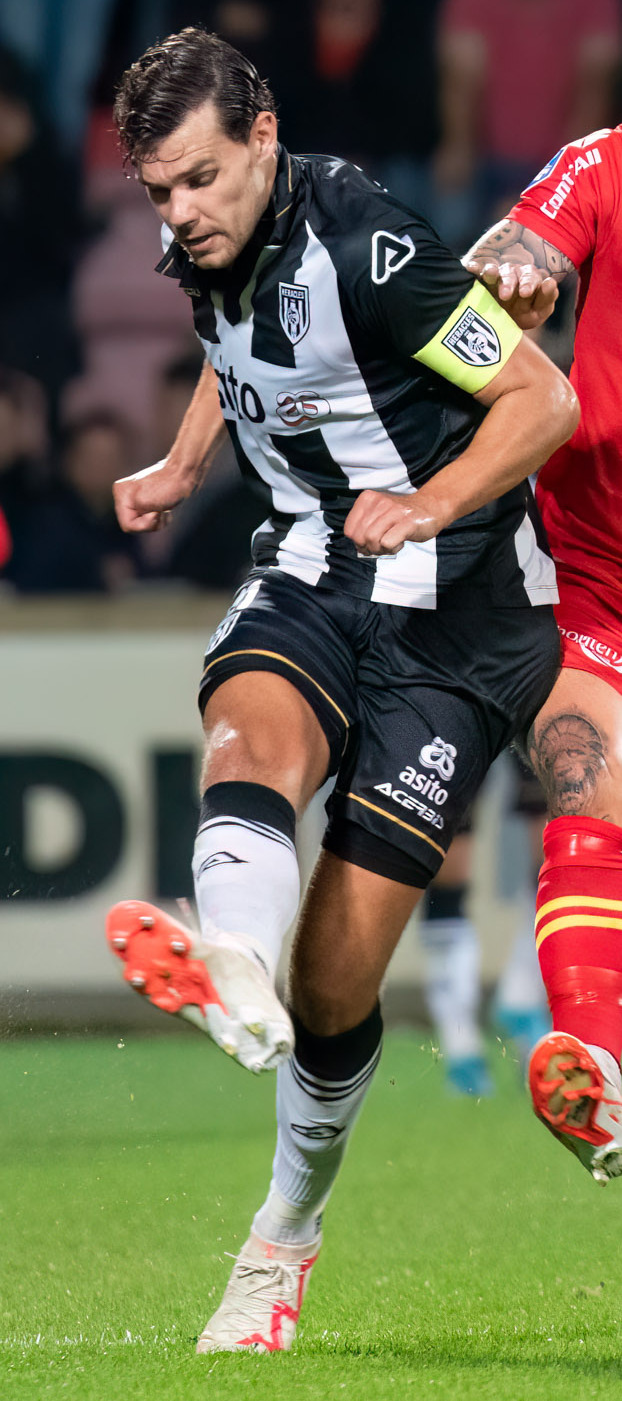
- Hoogma playing for Heracles Almelo

Personal information
- Date of birth: 11 June 1998 (age 28)
- Place of birth: Enschede, Netherlands
- Height: 1.90 m (6 ft 3 in)
- Position: Centre-back

Team information
- Current team: Willem II
- Number: 4

Youth career
- –2008: Quick '20
- 2008–2016: Heracles

Senior career*
Years	Team	Apps	(Gls)
2016–2017	Heracles	36	(0)
2017–2022	1899 Hoffenheim	2	(0)
2019	→ St. Pauli (loan)	14	(0)
2019–2021	→ Utrecht (loan)	40	(2)
2021–2022	→ Greuther Fürth (loan)	3	(0)
2022–2025	Heracles	89	(7)
2025–	Willem II	32	(2)

International career
2016–2017	Netherlands U19	4	(1)
2017–2020	Netherlands U21	14	(0)
- * Club domestic league appearances and goals as of 28 April 2026

Justin Hoogma (born 11 June 1998) is a Dutch professional footballer who plays as a centre-back for Eredivisie club Willem II.

== Club career ==
Hoogma had his breakthrough in the 2016–2017 season, becoming the youngest player ever to not have missed a single minute in a full Eredivisie season, playing all 34 matches for Heracles Almelo.

On 13 June 2017, 1899 Hoffenheim announced the transfer of the young prospect on a four-year contract, for an undisclosed fee.

In January 2019, Hoogma joined 2. Bundesliga side FC St. Pauli on loan for the second half of the 2018–19 season.

On 15 July 2021, TSG Hoffenheim announced that Hoogma was being loaned to newly promoted Bundesliga side SpVgg Greuther Fürth on a season-long loan.

On 24 January 2022, Hoogma returned to his former club Heracles Almelo. He signed a contract until 2026 and will wear number 21.

In July 2025, Hoogma signed a two-season contract with Willem II.

== International career ==
Hoogma played 14 games for the Netherlands national under-21 football team and 4 for the U19s.

== Personal life ==
His father is former Dutch footballer Nico-Jan Hoogma.

== Career statistics ==
As of matches played on 30 January 2019

Appearances and goals by club, season and competition
Club	Season	League			Cup		Continental		Other		Total	
Club	Season	Division	Apps	Goals	Apps	Goals	Apps	Goals	Apps	Goals	Apps	Goals
Heracles Almelo	2015–16	Eredivisie	2	0	0	0	—		1 (Note: Appearance in Eredivisie playoff)	0	3	0
Heracles Almelo	2016–17	Eredivisie	34	0	3	0	1	0	—		38	0
Heracles Almelo	Total		36	0	3	0	1	0	1	0	41	0
1899 Hoffenheim	2017–18	Bundesliga	0	0	0	0	2	0	—		2	0
1899 Hoffenheim	2018–19	Bundesliga	2	0	1	0	1	0	—		4	0
1899 Hoffenheim	Total		2	0	1	0	3	0	0	0	6	0
1899 Hoffenheim II	2017–18	Regionalliga Südwest	10	0	—		—		—		10	0
1899 Hoffenheim II	2018–19	Regionalliga Südwest	5	2	—		—		—		5	2
1899 Hoffenheim II	Total		15	2	0	0	0	0	0	0	15	2
FC St. Pauli	2018–19	2. Bundesliga	0	0	0	0	–		0	0	0	0
Career total			53	2	4	0	4	0	1	0	62	2
