= Svend Brodersen =

German footballer (born 1997)

Personal information
- Full name: Svend Arvid Stanislaw Brodersen
- Date of birth: 22 March 1997 (age 29)
- Place of birth: Hamburg, Germany
- Height: 1.88 m (6 ft 2 in)
- Position: Goalkeeper

Team information
- Current team: Kawasaki Frontale
- Number: 49

Youth career
- 2001–2002: FC St. Pauli
- 2002–2004: Eimsbütteler TV
- 2004–2006: FC St. Pauli
- 2006–2010: Eimsbütteler TV
- 2010–2015: FC St. Pauli

Senior career*
Years	Team	Apps	(Gls)
2015–2021	FC St. Pauli II	80	(0)
2015–2021	FC St. Pauli	6	(0)
2021–2023	Yokohama FC	64	(0)
2024–2025	Fagiano Okayama	75	(0)
2026–	Kawasaki Frontale	15	(0)

International career
2016–2017	Germany U20	4	(0)
2018	Germany U21	1	(0)
- * Club domestic league appearances and goals as of 1 August 2026

Svend Arvid Stanislaw Brodersen (born 22 March 1997) is a German professional footballer who plays as a goalkeeper for J1 League club Kawasaki Frontale.

== Club career ==
Brodersen made his professional debut for FC St. Pauli in the 2. Bundesliga on 8 February 2019, starting in the away match against 1. FC Köln, which finished as a 4–1 loss.

Brodersen joined struggling J1 League side Yokohama in the summer of 2021, making his debut in a 2–0 home win against Nagoya Grampus.

On 2 January 2024, Brodersen joined J2 League club Fagiano Okayama for the 2024 season. On 7 December 2024, Brodersen helped his club secure promotion to the J1 League for the first time in their history after defeating Vegalta Sendai 2-0 in the promotion play-off final. He was inducted into the 2024 J2 League team of the season for his efforts.

After two seasons with Fagiano Okayama, Brodersen joined Kawasaki Frontale in December 2025.

== International career ==
Brodersen was included in Germany's squad for the 2017 FIFA U-20 World Cup in South Korea. He made two appearances in the group stage, along with the round of 16 match against Zambia, in which Germany were eliminated with a 4–3 loss after extra time.

== Career statistics ==
As of 30 March 2026.

Appearances and goals by club, season and competition
Club	Season	League			National cup		League cup (Note: Includes J.League Cup)		Other		Total	
Club	Season	Division	Apps	Goals	Apps	Goals	Apps	Goals	Apps	Goals	Apps	Goals
FC St. Pauli II	2014–15	Regionalliga Nord	8	0	—		—		—		8	0
FC St. Pauli II	2014–15	Regionalliga Nord	26	0	—		—		—		26	0
FC St. Pauli II	2014–15	Regionalliga Nord	22	0	—		—		—		22	0
FC St. Pauli II	2017–18	Regionalliga Nord	11	0	—		—		—		11	0
FC St. Pauli II	2018–19	Regionalliga Nord	8	0	—		—		—		8	0
FC St. Pauli II	2019–20	Regionalliga Nord	3	0	—		—		—		3	0
FC St. Pauli II	2020–21	Regionalliga Nord	2	0	—		—		—		2	0
FC St. Pauli II	Total		80	0	—		—		—		80	0
FC St. Pauli	2013–14	2. Bundesliga	0	0	0	0	—		—		0	0
FC St. Pauli	2015–16	2. Bundesliga	0	0	0	0	—		—		0	0
FC St. Pauli	2016–17	2. Bundesliga	0	0	0	0	—		—		0	0
FC St. Pauli	2017–18	2. Bundesliga	0	0	0	0	—		—		0	0
FC St. Pauli	2018–19	2. Bundesliga	2	0	0	0	—		—		2	0
FC St. Pauli	2019–20	2. Bundesliga	0	0	0	0	—		—		0	0
FC St. Pauli	2020–21	2. Bundesliga	2	0	0	0	—		—		2	0
FC St. Pauli	Total		4	0	0	0	—		—		4	0
Yokohama FC	2021	J1 League	16	0	—		—		—		16	0
Yokohama FC	2022	J2 League	35	0	0	0	—		—		35	0
Yokohama FC	2023	J1 League	13	0	0	0	2	0	—		15	0
Yokohama FC	Total		64	0	0	0	2	0	—		66	0
Fagiano Okayama	2024	J2 League	38	0	0	0	0	0	2 (Note: Appearance in J1/J2 play-offs)	0	40	0
Fagiano Okayama	2025	J1 League	37	0	0	0	0	0	—		37	0
Fagiano Okayama	Total		75	0	0	0	2	0	2	0	77	0
Kawasaki Frontale	2026	J1 (100)	8	0	–		–		—		8	0
Career total			231	0	0	0	2	0	2	0	235	0

== Honours ==
=== Individual ===
- J2 League Best XI: 2024
