= Korbinian Müller =

German footballer

Personal information
- Date of birth: 6 February 1991 (age 35)
- Place of birth: Bad Tölz, Germany
- Height: 1.90 m (6 ft 3 in)
- Position: Goalkeeper

Youth career
- Lenggrieser SC
- –2010: SpVgg Unterhaching

Senior career*
Years	Team	Apps	(Gls)
2010–2013	SpVgg Unterhaching II	28	(0)
2011–2014	SpVgg Unterhaching	44	(0)
2014–2016	Stuttgarter Kickers	42	(0)
2016–2018	SpVgg Unterhaching	36	(0)
2018–2019	FC St. Pauli II	12	(0)
2018–2019	FC St. Pauli	0	(0)
2019–2020	FC St. Pauli	1	(0)
- * Club domestic league appearances and goals

Korbinian Müller (born 6 February 1991) is a German professional footballer who plays as a goalkeeper.

== Career ==
Müller joined FC St. Pauli in August 2018. He left the club at the end of the season where his contract expired. However, he signed a new deal with the club on 8 October 2019 until the end of the season.
