= Jan-Philipp Kalla =

German footballer

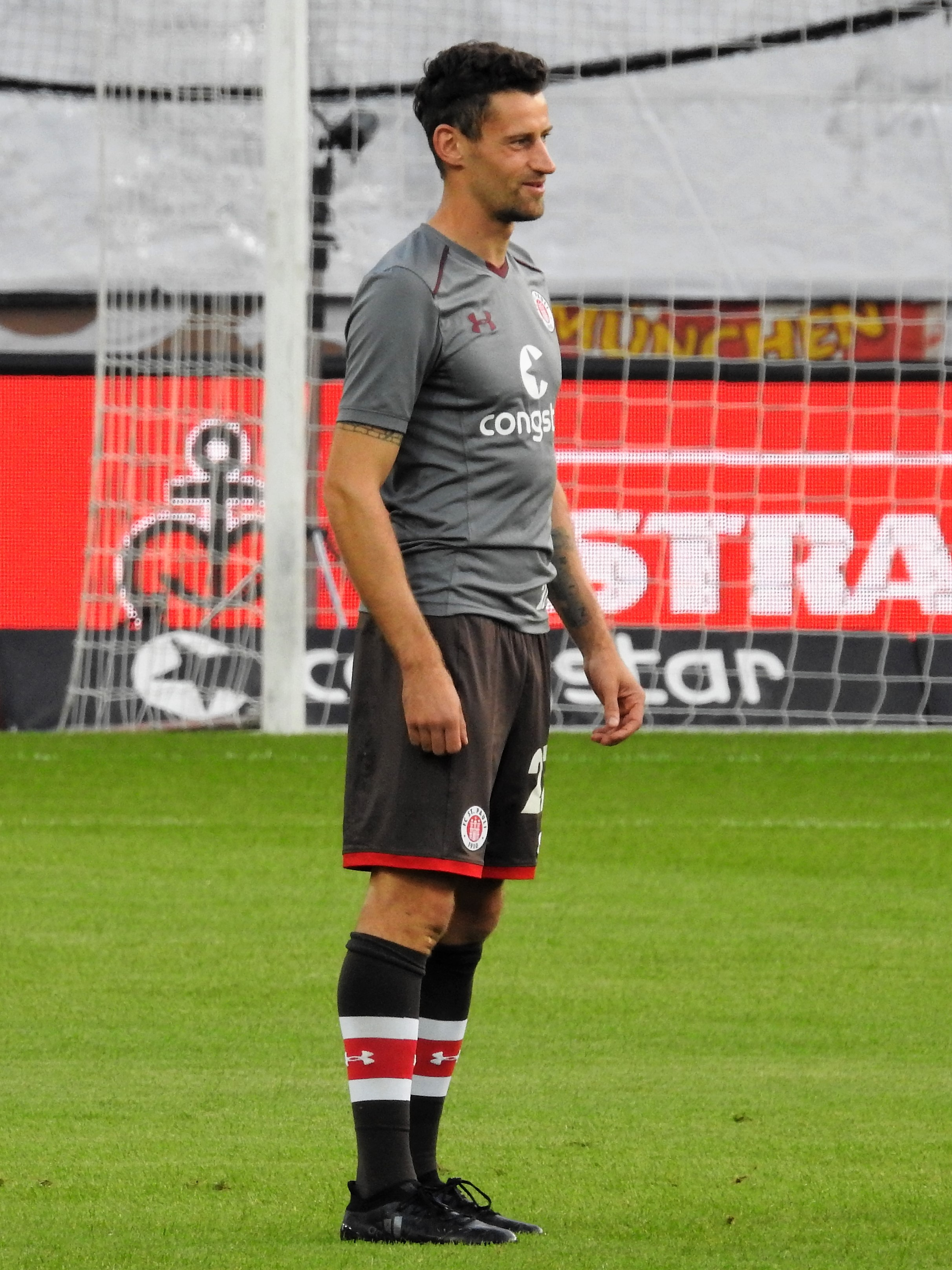
- Kalla with FC St. Pauli in 2017

Personal information
- Date of birth: 6 August 1986 (age 40)
- Place of birth: Hamburg, West Germany
- Height: 1.82 m (6 ft 0 in)
- Position: Defender

Team information
- Current team: SC Victoria Hamburg

Youth career
- SC Concordia Hamburg
- –2003: Hamburger SV
- 2003–2005: FC St. Pauli

Senior career*
Years	Team	Apps	(Gls)
2005–2018	FC St. Pauli II	93	(5)
2007–2020	FC St. Pauli	164	(4)
2020–	SC Victoria Hamburg	3	(0)
- * Club domestic league appearances and goals as of 1 July 2021

Jan-Philipp Kalla (born 6 August 1986) is a German former professional footballer who played as a defender for SC Victoria Hamburg. He spent his entire professional career with FC St. Pauli.

== Career ==
Kalla made his debut on the professional league level in the 2. Bundesliga for FC St. Pauli on 6 May 2008 in a game against 1. FC Kaiserslautern.

His contract with FC St. Pauli was not extended at the end of the 2019–20 season. He spent 17 years at the club and made 164 league appearances.

== Post-playing career ==
Kalla took up a representative role at FC St. Pauli in August 2020. He also joined fifth-tier side SC Victoria Hamburg.

== Career statistics ==
Appearances and goals by club, season and competition
Club	Season	League			Cup		Total	
Club	Season	Division	Apps	Goals	Apps	Goals	Apps	Goals
FC St. Pauli	2. Bundesliga	2007–08	1	0	0	0	1	0
FC St. Pauli	2. Bundesliga	2008–09	16	0	0	0	16	0
FC St. Pauli	2. Bundesliga	2009–10	8	1	0	0	8	1
FC St. Pauli	Bundesliga	2010–11	5	0	0	0	5	0
FC St. Pauli	2. Bundesliga	2011–12	12	0	1	0	13	0
FC St. Pauli	2. Bundesliga	2012–13	26	0	2	0	28	0
FC St. Pauli	2. Bundesliga	2013–14	23	1	1	0	24	1
FC St. Pauli	2. Bundesliga	2014–15	16	1	2	0	18	1
FC St. Pauli	2. Bundesliga	2015–16	15	1	0	0	15	1
FC St. Pauli	2. Bundesliga	2016–17	13	0	0	0	13	0
FC St. Pauli	2. Bundesliga	2017–18	11	0	1	0	12	0
FC St. Pauli	2. Bundesliga	2018–19	10	0	0	0	10	0
FC St. Pauli	2. Bundesliga	2019–20	8	0	1	0	9	0
Career statistics			164	4	8	0	172	4
