= Jakub Bednarczyk =

Polish association football player

Personal information
- Full name: Jakub Jacek Bednarczyk
- Date of birth: 2 January 1999 (age 27)
- Place of birth: Tarnowskie Góry, Poland
- Height: 1.84 m (6 ft 0 in)
- Position: Defender

Team information
- Current team: Górnik Łęczna
- Number: 21

Youth career
- –2011: Bergisch Gladbach
- 2011–2018: Bayer Leverkusen

Senior career*
Years	Team	Apps	(Gls)
2018–2019	Bayer Leverkusen	0	(0)
2019–2022	FC St. Pauli II	50	(6)
2019	FC St. Pauli	1	(0)
2020–2021	→ Zagłębie Lubin (loan)	8	(0)
2021	→ Zagłębie Lubin II (loan)	1	(0)
2023–	Górnik Łęczna	75	(5)

International career
2015	Poland U16	3	(0)
2016	Poland U17	3	(0)
2016–2017	Poland U18	5	(0)
2018	Poland U19	2	(0)
2018–2019	Poland U20	16	(4)
2019	Poland U21	1	(0)
- * Club domestic league appearances and goals as of 16:15, 20 February 2026 (UTC)

Jakub Jacek Bednarczyk (born 2 January 1999) is a Polish professional footballer who plays as a defender for II liga club Górnik Łęczna.

== Career ==
In January 2019, Bednarczyk joined 2. Bundesliga side FC St. Pauli from Bundesliga club Bayer Leverkusen, having agreed a contract until 2021.

On 17 March 2023, he made his return to Polish football after signing a deal until the end of the season with I liga side Górnik Łęczna.
