= Kevin Lankford =

American soccer player

Personal information
- Date of birth: November 16, 1998 (age 27)
- Place of birth: Heidenheim, Germany
- Height: 1.83 m (6 ft 0 in)
- Position: Winger

Team information
- Current team: Carl Zeiss Jena
- Number: 7

Youth career
- –2015: SSV Ulm
- 2015–2016: 1. FC Heidenheim

Senior career*
Years	Team	Apps	(Gls)
2017–2019	1. FC Heidenheim	30	(0)
2019–2021	FC St. Pauli II	7	(3)
2019–2021	FC St. Pauli	21	(0)
2021	→ SV Wehen Wiesbaden (loan)	16	(2)
2021–2022	SV Wehen Wiesbaden	20	(3)
2022–2024	Viktoria Köln	24	(1)
2023	→ Orange County SC (loan)	12	(1)
2024	Kickers Offenbach	8	(2)
2024–2025	BFC Dynamo	26	(5)
2025–	Carl Zeiss Jena	43	(7)

International career
2016	United States U19	3	(1)
- * Club domestic league appearances and goals as of 23 September 2026

Kevin Lankford (born November 16, 1998) is a professional footballer who plays as a winger for German Regionalliga Nordost club Carl Zeiss Jena. Born in Germany, he has represented the United States at youth level.

== Club career ==
Lankford signed his first professional contract with Heidenheim in 2017. He made his professional debut for Heidenheim on March 12, 2017, in a 1–1 draw against 1. FC Kaiserslautern in a 2. Bundesliga match.

On January 29, 2019, Lankford joined FC St. Pauli on a contract until June 2022.

On July 25, 2023, Lankford joined Orange County SC on loan until the end of 2023, with an option to buy.

On January 31, 2024, Lankford signed with Kickers Offenbach.

On 26 May 2025, Lankford signed for FC Carl Zeiss Jena on two-year contract.

== International career ==
Lankford made his youth international debut for the United States under-19 team against Venezuela at the 2016 COTIF Tournament, coming on as a 56th-minute substitute.
