= Florian Carstens =

German footballer

Personal information
- Full name: Florian-Horst Carstens
- Date of birth: 8 November 1998 (age 27)
- Place of birth: Marschacht, Germany
- Height: 1.91 m (6 ft 3 in)
- Position: Centre-back

Team information
- Current team: Hansa Rostock
- Number: 17

Youth career
- –2014: MTV Treubund Lüneburg
- 2014–2017: FC St. Pauli

Senior career*
Years	Team	Apps	(Gls)
2016–2020	FC St. Pauli II	44	(7)
2018–2021	FC St. Pauli	22	(1)
2020–2021	→ Wehen Wiesbaden (loan)	29	(1)
2021–2025	Wehen Wiesbaden	99	(5)
2025–	Hansa Rostock	32	(2)
- * Club domestic league appearances and goals as of 28 May 2026

Florian-Horst Carstens (born 8 November 1998) is a German professional footballer who plays as a centre-back for 3. Liga club Hansa Rostock.

== Career ==
On 22 April 2025, Carstens signed a contract with Hansa Rostock, beginning in the 2025–26 season.
