= 2020–21 FC St. Pauli season =

FC St. Pauli
2020–21 season
- President: Oke Göttlich
- Manager: Timo Schultz
- Stadium: Millerntor-Stadion
- 2. Bundesliga: 10th
- DFB-Pokal: First round
- Top goalscorer: League: Guido Burgstaller (11); All: Guido Burgstaller (11)
Home colours	Away colours	Third colours

The 2020–21 FC St. Pauli season is the 110th season in the football club's history and 10th consecutive season in the second division of German football, the 2. Bundesliga and 28th overall. In addition to the domestic league, FC St. Pauli also are participating in this season's edition of the DFB-Pokal. This is the 58th season for FC St. Pauli in the Millerntor-Stadion, located in St. Pauli, Hamburg, Germany. The season covers a period from 1 July 2020 to 30 June 2021.

== Players ==
=== Squad information ===
As of 28 January 2021

Note: Flags indicate national team as defined under FIFA eligibility rules; some limited exceptions apply. Players may hold more than one non-FIFA nationality.

No.	Pos.	Nation	Player
1	GK	GER	Dennis Smarsch
2	DF	SWE	Sebastian Ohlsson
3	DF	WAL	James Lawrence
4	DF	GER	Philipp Ziereis
5	MF	GER	Marvin Knoll (vice-captain)
6	DF	GER	Christopher Avevor (captain)
8	MF	URU	Rodrigo Zalazar
9	FW	AUT	Guido Burgstaller
10	MF	GER	Christopher Buchtmann
11	MF	GER	Maximilian Dittgen
12	MF	JPN	Ryo Miyaichi
13	MF	GER	Lukas Daschner
14	MF	NGA	Afeez Aremu
15	DF	GER	Daniel Buballa
16	FW	DEN	Simon Makienok

No.	Pos.	Nation	Player
17	FW	GER	Daniel-Kofi Kyereh
18	MF	SWE	Eric Smith
19	DF	GER	Luca-Milan Zander
20	MF	GER	Finn Ole Becker
21	GK	MKD	Dejan Stojanović
22	FW	EGY	Omar Marmoush
23	DF	KOS	Leart Paqarada
24	DF	NOR	Tore Reginiussen
25	DF	POL	Adam Dźwigała
26	MF	GER	Rico Benatelli
29	MF	GER	Christian Viet
32	DF	GER	Jannes Wieckhoff
33	GK	GER	Svend Brodersen
34	FW	GER	Igor Matanović
36	MF	DOM	Luis Coordes

=== Transfers ===
==== Summer ====
In:

No.	Pos.	Nation	Player
1	GK	GER	Dennis Smarsch (from Hertha BSC)
3	DF	WAL	James Lawrence (from Anderlecht, previously on loan)
8	MF	URU	Rodrigo Zalazar (on loan from Eintracht Frankfurt)
9	FW	AUT	Guido Burgstaller (from Schalke 04)
11	MF	GER	Maximilian Dittgen (from SV Wehen Wiesbaden)
13	MF	GER	Lukas Daschner (from MSV Duisburg)
14	MF	NGA	Afeez Aremu (from IK Start)
16	FW	DEN	Simon Makienok (from Dynamo Dresden)
17	FW	GER	Daniel-Kofi Kyereh (from SV Wehen Wiesbaden)
23	DF	KOS	Leart Paqarada (from SV Sandhausen)
28	DF	GER	Marvin Senger (from FC St. Pauli II)
29	MF	GER	Christian Viet (from FC St. Pauli II)
32	DF	GER	Jannes Wieckhoff (from FC St. Pauli II)

Out:

No.	Pos.	Nation	Player
3	DF	NOR	Leo Skiri Østigård (loan return to Brighton & Hove Albion)
8	DF	GER	Marc Hornschuh (released to Hamburger SV II)
9	FW	SWE	Viktor Gyökeres (loan return to Brighton & Hove Albion)
17	DF	ENG	Matt Penney (loan return to Sheffield Wednesday)
18	FW	GRE	Dimitrios Diamantakos (to Hajduk Split)
20	DF	KOR	Park Yi-young (on loan at Türkgücü München)
22	MF	GER	Maximilian Franzke (on loan at 1. FC Magdeburg)
23	MF	GER	Johannes Flum (released to SC Freiburg)
25	FW	NED	Henk Veerman (to SC Heerenveen)
27	DF	GER	Jan-Philipp Kalla (retired, later joined SC Victoria Hamburg)
28	MF	POL	Waldemar Sobota (released to Śląsk Wrocław)
31	MF	GER	Ersin Zehir (on loan at VfB Lübeck)
32	MF	GER	Christian Conteh (to Feyenoord)
38	DF	GER	Florian Carstens (on loan at SV Wehen Wiesbaden)
40	GK	GER	Korbinian Müller (released)
—	DF	POL	Jakub Bednarczyk (on loan at Zagłębie Lubin)

==== Winter ====
In:

No.	Pos.	Nation	Player
18	MF	SWE	Eric Smith (on loan from Gent)
21	GK	MKD	Dejan Stojanović (on loan from Middlesbrough)
22	FW	EGY	Omar Marmoush (on loan from VfL Wolfsburg)
24	DF	NOR	Tore Reginiussen (from Rosenborg BK)
25	DF	POL	Adam Dźwigała (from Aves)

Out:

No.	Pos.	Nation	Player
7	MF	GER	Kevin Lankford (on loan at SV Wehen Wiesbaden)
24	FW	UKR	Borys Tashchy (released to Pohang Steelers)
28	DF	GER	Marvin Senger (on loan at 1. FC Kaiserslautern)
30	GK	GER	Robin Himmelmann (released to Eupen)
38	MF	USA	Leon Flach (released to Philadelphia Union)

== Matches ==
Legend

Win Draw Loss

=== Friendly matches ===
15 August 2020 Friendly	Holstein Kiel	2−1	FC St. Pauli	Kiel
15:30	Girth 59'; Reese 68'	Report	Kyereh 17'; Senger (yellow card) 41'	Stadium: Nachwuchsleistungszentrum Projensdorf; Attendance: 0 Referee: Patrick Schwengers (Travemünde)

21 August 2020 Friendly	FC St. Pauli	0−0	AGF	Hamburg
13:00		Report	Juelsgård (yellow card); Jevtović (yellow card)	Stadium: Millerntor-Stadion; Attendance: 0 Referee: Fabian Porsch (Hamburg)

29 August 2020 Friendly	Werder Bremen	1−0	FC St. Pauli	Lohne
17:15	Rashica 43'	Report	Senger (yellow card)	Stadium: Heinz-Dettmer-Stadion; Attendance: 0 Referee: Franz Bokop (Vechta)

2 September 2020 Friendly	SV Meppen	1−2	FC St. Pauli	Meppen
14:00	Guder 51'	Report	Tashchy 3' (pen.); Stark 83'	Stadium: Hänsch-Arena; Attendance: 0 Referee: Franz Bokop (Vechta)

6 September 2020 Friendly	FC St. Pauli	1−0	SønderjyskE	Hamburg
14:00	Tashchy 29'	Report	Hassan (yellow card) 66'	Stadium: Millerntor-Stadion; Attendance: 0 Referee: Adrian Höhns (Hamburg)

7 October 2020 Friendly	Werder Bremen	4−1	FC St. Pauli	Bremen
17:00	Chong 11', 87'; Sargent 15'; Bittencourt 35'; Groß (yellow card)	Report	Tashchy 65'; Benatelli (yellow card)	Stadium: Weserstadion Platz 11; Attendance: 0 Referee: Sven Jablonski (Bremen)

8 October 2020 Friendly	Holstein Kiel	0−1	FC St. Pauli	Kiel
14:00	Dehm (yellow card); Ignjovski (yellow card)	Report	Kyereh 66'	Stadium: Nachwuchsleistungszentrum Projensdorf; Attendance: 0 Referee: Patrick Schwengers (Travemünde)

13 November 2020 Friendly	Werder Bremen	2−4	FC St. Pauli	Bremen
14:00	Viet 60' (o.g.); Nankishi 93'	Report	Makienok 15'; Daschner 53'; Tashchy 61' (pen.); Matanović 85'	Stadium: Weserstadion Platz 11; Attendance: 0 Referee: Sven Jablonski (Bremen)
Note: The game was played in three halves of 35 minutes each.

25 March 2021 Friendly	Arminia Bielefeld	1–1	FC St. Pauli	Bielefeld
14:00	Voglsammer 18'	Report	Daschner 2'	Stadium: Bielefelder Alm; Attendance: 0 Referee: Patrick Holz (Münster)

=== 2. Bundesliga ===
==== League table ====
Pos	Team	Pld	W	D	L	GF	GA	GD	Pts
8	1. FC Heidenheim	34	15	6	13	49	49	0	51
9	SC Paderborn	34	12	11	11	53	45	+8	47
10	FC St. Pauli	34	13	8	13	51	56	−5	47
11	1. FC Nürnberg	34	11	11	12	46	51	−5	44
12	Erzgebirge Aue	34	12	8	14	44	53	−9	44

Source: DFB
Rules for classification: 1) Points; 2) Goal difference; 3) Goals scored; 4) Head-to-head points; 5) Head-to-head goal difference; 6) Head-to-head away goals scored; 7) Away goals scored; 8) Play-off.

==== Results summary ====
Overall								Home						Away					
Pld	W	D	L	GF	GA	GD	Pts	W	D	L	GF	GA	GD	W	D	L	GF	GA	GD
34	13	8	13	51	56	−5	47	8	4	6	28	25	+3	5	4	7	23	31	−8

Last updated: 23 May 2021.
Source: Kicker

==== Results by round ====
Round	1	2	3	4	5	6	7	8	9	10	11	12	13	14	15	16	17	18	19	20	21	22	23	24	25	26	27	28	29	30	31	32	33	34
Ground	A	H	A	H	A	A	H	A	H	A	H	A	H	A	H	A	H	H	A	H	A	H	H	A	H	A	H	A	H	A	H	A	H	A
Result	D	W	L	D	D	D	L	L	L	L	D	D	L	L	D	W	W	L	W	W	W	W	W	D	L	W	W	W	W	L	W	L	L	L
Position	8	3	9	7	9	11	17	17	17	17	17	17	17	17	17	17	15	16	15	14	13	11	11	10	11	11	8	8	7	8	7	7	9	10

Updated to match(es) played on 23 May 2021. Source: Kicker
A = Away; H = Home; W = Win; D = Draw; L = Loss

==== Results ====
21 September 2020 1	VfL Bochum	2−2	FC St. Pauli	Bochum
20:30 UTC+2	Žulj 26'; Losilla (yellow card) 73'; Zoller 76'	FCSP Report; Kicker Report	Ohlsson (yellow card) 10'; Avevor (yellow card) 44'; Paqarada (yellow card) 47'; Kyereh 84', 86'	Stadium: Vonovia Ruhrstadion; Attendance: 3,421; Referee: Robert Schröder (Hanover)

27 September 2020 2	FC St. Pauli	4−2	1. FC Heidenheim	Hamburg
13:30 UTC+2	Kyereh 26'; Schmidt 34' (o.g.); Wieckhoff 46'; Dittgen 70'; Aremu (yellow card) 82'	FCSP Report; Kicker Report	Kühlwetter 78'; Mohr 80'; Otto (yellow card) 90+2'	Stadium: Millerntor-Stadion; Attendance: 2,226; Referee: Sven Jablonski (Bremen)

2 October 2020 3	SV Sandhausen	1−0	FC St. Pauli	Sandhausen
18:30 UTC+2	Buballa 45' (o.g.); Nartey (yellow card) 68'; Biada (yellow card) 74'	FCSP Report; Kicker Report	Avevor (yellow card) 50'; Ohlsson (yellow card) 78'	Stadium: BWT-Stadion am Hardtwald; Attendance: 1,393; Referee: Sven Waschitzki (Essen)

19 October 2020 4	FC St. Pauli	2−2	1. FC Nürnberg	Hamburg
20:30 UTC+2	Zalazar 28'; Ohlsson (yellow card) 31'; Avevor (yellow card) 49'; Becker (yellow card) 55'; Buballa 78'	FCSP Report; Kicker Report	Schäffler 8', (yellow card) 44'; Krauß (yellow card) 27'; Sørensen (yellow card) 33'; Geis 49' (pen.); Lohkemper (yellow card) 65'; Köpke (yellow card) 76'; Nürnberger (yellow card) 80'	Stadium: Millerntor-Stadion; Attendance: 1,000; Referee: Florian Heft (Neuenkirchen)

24 October 2020 5	Darmstadt 98	2−2	FC St. Pauli	Darmstadt
13:00 UTC+2	Dursun 45' (pen.), 76'; Mehlem (yellow card) 74'; Holland (yellow card) 87'	FCSP Report; Kicker Report	Zander (yellow card) 61'; Buballa (yellow card) 79'; Benatelli 81', (yellow card) 84'; Zalazar 90+5' (pen.), (yellow card) 90+6'	Stadium: Merck-Stadion am Böllenfalltor; Attendance: 0 Referee: Marco Fritz (Korb)

30 October 2020 6	Hamburger SV	2−2	FC St. Pauli	Hamburg
18:30 UTC+1	Terodde 12', 84'; Kittel (yellow card) 71'	FCSP Report; Kicker Report	Zalazar 35'; Dittgen (yellow card) 56'; Makienok 82'	Stadium: Volksparkstadion; Attendance: 1,000; Referee: Manuel Gräfe (Berlin)

8 November 2020 7	FC St. Pauli	0−3	Karlsruher SC	Hamburg
13:30 UTC+1	Dittgen (yellow card) 57'	FCSP Report; Kicker Report	Thiede 4'; Gondorf (yellow card) 23', (goal) 50'; Hofmann 76'	Stadium: Millerntor-Stadion; Attendance: 0 Referee: Alexander Sather (Grimma)

21 November 2020 8	SC Paderborn 07	2−0	FC St. Pauli	Paderborn
13:00 UTC+1	Srbeny (penalty missed) 39, 39'; Führich 56'; Collins (yellow card) 61'	FCSP Report; Kicker Report	Zalazar (penalty missed) 21; Kyereh (yellow card) 45'; Avevor (yellow card) 76'	Stadium: Benteler-Arena; Attendance: 0 Referee: Christian Dingert (Gries)

27 November 2020 9	FC St. Pauli	0−1	VfL Osnabrück	Hamburg
18:30 UTC+1	Lawrence (yellow card) 89'	FCSP Report; Kicker Report	Henning (yellow card) 43'; Trapp (yellow card) 56'; Beermann (yellow card) 65'; Amenyido (yellow card) 66'; Blacha 86'	Stadium: Millerntor-Stadion; Attendance: 0 Referee: Matthias Jöllenbeck (Freiburg im Breisgau)

5 December 2020 10	Eintracht Braunschweig	2−1	FC St. Pauli	Braunschweig
13:00 UTC+1	Nikolaou (yellow card) 7'; Wiebe (yellow card) 17'; Kessel (yellow card) 45'; Bär 67'; Kaufmann 82'	FCSP Report; Kicker Report	Dittgen 2'; Benatelli (yellow card) 75'	Stadium: Eintracht-Stadion; Attendance: 0 Referee: Timo Gerach (Landau)

13 December 2020 11	FC St. Pauli	2−2	Erzgebirge Aue	Hamburg
13:30 UTC+1	Buballa (yellow card) 17'; Lawrence (yellow card) 57'; Tashchy (yellow card) 60'; Dittgen 81'; Makienok 89'; Knoll (yellow card) 90+2'	FCSP Report; Kicker Report	Testroet 10'; Krüger 79'; Riese (yellow card) 88'	Stadium: Millerntor-Stadion; Attendance: 0 Referee: Lasse Koslowski (Berlin)

20 December 2020 13	FC St. Pauli	0−3	Fortuna Düsseldorf	Hamburg
13:30 UTC+1	Brodersen (yellow card) 80'	FCSP Report; Kicker Report	Zimmermann 10'; Hennings 64'; Morales (yellow card) 86'; Kownacki (yellow card) 90+2'; Prib 90+3'	Stadium: Millerntor-Stadion; Attendance: 0 Referee: Robert Schröder (Hanover)

3 January 2021 14	Greuther Fürth	2−1	FC St. Pauli	Fürth
13:30 UTC+1	Green 24' (pen.); Nielsen 27'; Seguin (yellow card) 79'	FCSP Report; Kicker Report	Knoll (yellow card) 23'; Paqarada (yellow card) 38'; Aremu (yellow card) 66'; Ohlsson (yellow card) 80'; Flach 82'	Stadium: Sportpark Ronhof Thomas Sommer; Attendance: 0 Referee: Tobias Reichel (Stuttgart)

6 January 2021 12	Würzburger Kickers	1−1	FC St. Pauli	Würzburg
20:30 UTC+1	Pieringer 9' (pen.); Baumann (yellow card) 56'; Ewerton (yellow card) 73'	FCSP Report; Kicker Report	Knoll (yellow card) 8' (yellow-red card) 41'; Becker (yellow card) 39'; Benatelli (yellow card) 53', (goal) 57'; Ohlsson (yellow card) 60'; Aremu (yellow card) 68'	Stadium: Flyeralarm Arena; Attendance: 0 Referee: Michael Bacher (Kirchensur)
Note: The game was originally scheduled for 16 December 2020, but because a member of the Würzburger Kickers staff tested positive for COVID-19, the game has been postponed after the team has been sent into a preventive quarantine until further notice. The Deutsche Fußball Liga rescheduled the game for 6 January.

9 January 2021 15	FC St. Pauli	1−1	Holstein Kiel	Hamburg
13:00 UTC+1	Zalazar (yellow card) 6'; Marmoush 52'; Dźwigała (yellow card) 67'	FCSP Report; Kicker Report	Van den Bergh (yellow card) 39'; Mees 62'	Stadium: Millerntor-Stadion; Attendance: 0 Referee: Frank Willenborg (Osnabrück)

16 January 2021 16	Hannover 96	2−3	FC St. Pauli	Hanover
13:00 UTC+1	Sulejmani (yellow card) 32'; Bijol (yellow card) 41' (yellow-red card) 87'; Ducksch (yellow card) 45+2'; Haraguchi 53', 55'; Franke (yellow card) 69'; Hübers (yellow card) 79'	FCSP Report; Kicker Report	Zalazar 2'; Burgstaller 10'; Becker (yellow card) 29'; Matanović 90+2'	Stadium: HDI-Arena; Attendance: 0 Referee: Sören Storks (Velen)

24 January 2021 17	FC St. Pauli	2−0	Jahn Regensburg	Hamburg
13:30 UTC+1	Zalazar (yellow card) 9'; Burgstaller 27', (yellow card) 80'; Marmoush 49'; Matanović (yellow card) 87'	FCSP Report; Kicker Report	Saller (yellow card) 65'; Elvedi (yellow card) 79'; Gimber (yellow card) 83'	Stadium: Millerntor-Stadion; Attendance: 0 Referee: Bastian Dankert (Rostock)

28 January 2021 18	FC St. Pauli	2−3	VfL Bochum	Hamburg
20:30 UTC+1	Burgstaller 4'; Kyereh 32'	FCSP Report; Kicker Report	Gamboa (yellow card) 10'; Zoller 28', 43'; Buballa 63' (o.g.)	Stadium: Millerntor-Stadion; Attendance: 0 Referee: Harm Osmers (Hanover)

31 January 2021 19	1. FC Heidenheim	3−4	FC St. Pauli	Heidenheim an der Brenz
13:30 UTC+1	Kleindienst 15', 77'; Thomalla (yellow card) 32'; Kühlwetter 48', (yellow card) 90+4'; Burnić (yellow card) 70'; Busch (yellow card) 73'; Mainka (yellow card) 74'	FCSP Report; Kicker Report	Burgstaller 3'; Kyereh 30'; Paqarada (yellow card) 42'; Smith (yellow card) 56'; Becker 72'; Zalazar 87'	Stadium: Voith-Arena; Attendance: 0 Referee: Nicolas Winter (Hagenbach)

5 February 2021 20	FC St. Pauli	2−1	SV Sandhausen	Hamburg
18:30 UTC+1	Kyereh 67', (yellow card) 90+5'; Burgstaller 71'	FCSP Report; Kicker Report	Röseler (yellow card) 17'; Behrens 74'; Rossipal (yellow card) 75'; Nartey (yellow card) 90+5'	Stadium: Millerntor-Stadion; Attendance: 0 Referee: Patrick Alt (Illingen)

14 February 2021 21	1. FC Nürnberg	1−2	FC St. Pauli	Nuremberg
13:30 UTC+1	Krauß (yellow card) 36'; Schäffler (yellow card) 68'; Borkowski 77'; Klauß (yellow card) 90+7'	FCSP Report; Kicker Report	Ziereis (yellow card) 8'; Lawrence (yellow card) 16'; Burgstaller 45+1'; Marmoush 65' (pen.); Matanović (yellow card) 90+4'	Stadium: Max-Morlock-Stadion; Attendance: 0 Referee: Alexander Sather (Grimma)

20 February 2021 22	FC St. Pauli	3−2	Darmstadt 98	Hamburg
13:00 UTC+1	Burgstaller 26', 82'; Marmoush 62', (yellow card) 85'; Zander (yellow card) 90+1'	FCSP Report; Kicker Report	Skarke 64'; Dursun 66'; Rapp (yellow card) 68'; Kempe (yellow card) 73'	Stadium: Millerntor-Stadion; Attendance: 0 Referee: Michael Bacher (Kirchensur)

1 March 2021 23	FC St. Pauli	1−0	Hamburger SV	Hamburg
20:30 UTC+1	Ziereis (yellow card) 11'; Marmoush (yellow card) 31'; Reginiussen (yellow card) 49'; Benatelli (yellow card) 56'; Kyereh 88'; Burgstaller (yellow card) 90+4'	FCSP Report; Kicker Report	Jung (yellow card) 35'; Leibold (red card) 90+5'	Stadium: Millerntor-Stadion; Attendance: 0 Referee: Deniz Aytekin (Oberasbach)

6 March 2021 24	Karlsruher SC	0−0	FC St. Pauli	Karlsruhe
13:00 UTC+1	Gondorf (yellow card) 27'	FCSP Report; Kicker Report	Ohlsson (yellow card) 66'	Stadium: Wildparkstadion; Attendance: 0 Referee: Christian Dingert (Gries)

15 March 2021 25	FC St. Pauli	0−2	SC Paderborn 07	Hamburg
20:30 UTC+1	Aremu (yellow card) 59'; Ohlsson (yellow card) 90+3'	FCSP Report; Kicker Report	Hünemeier (yellow card) 2'; Führich 7'; Schonlau 69'; Vasiliadis (yellow card) 85'	Stadium: Millerntor-Stadion; Attendance: 0 Referee: Robert Schröder (Hanover)

21 March 2021 26	VfL Osnabrück	1−2	FC St. Pauli	Osnabrück
13:30 UTC+1	Ajdini (yellow card) 70'; Heider 79'	FCSP Report; Kicker Report	Ziereis (yellow card) 38'; Burgstaller 51' (pen.); Marmoush 65'	Stadium: Stadion an der Bremer Brücke; Attendance: 0 Referee: Martin Thomsen (Kleve)

5 April 2021 27	FC St. Pauli	2−0	Eintracht Braunschweig	Hamburg
20:30 UTC+2	Marmoush 7'; Kyereh 14', (yellow card) 28'; Zander (yellow card) 59'	FCSP Report; Kicker Report	Kroos (yellow card) 28'	Stadium: Millerntor-Stadion; Attendance: 0 Referee: Arne Aarnink (Nordhorn)

10 April 2021 28	Erzgebirge Aue	1−3	FC St. Pauli	Aue
13:00 UTC+2	Riese (yellow card) 56'; Breitkreuz (yellow card) 66'; Testroet 73'	FCSP Report; Kicker Report	Zander 1', 56'; Zalazar 49'	Stadium: Erzgebirgsstadion; Attendance: 0 Referee: Florian Heft (Neuenkirchen)

17 April 2021 29	FC St. Pauli	4−0	Würzburger Kickers	Hamburg
13:00 UTC+2	Marmoush 4'; Benatelli 18'; Paqarada 22'; Kyereh 50'; Dittgen (yellow card) 59'	FCSP Report; Kicker Report		Stadium: Millerntor-Stadion; Attendance: 0 Referee: Christian Dingert (Gries)

21 April 2021 30	Fortuna Düsseldorf	2−0	FC St. Pauli	Düsseldorf
18:30 UTC+2	Peterson (yellow card) 23'; Klaus 26'; Danso 49'; Piotrowski (yellow card) 90+1'	FCSP Report; Kicker Report	Kyereh (yellow card) 30'; Lawrence (yellow card) 46'; Reginiussen (yellow card) 80'; Paqarada (yellow card) 86'	Stadium: Esprit Arena; Attendance: 0 Referee: Michael Bacher (Kirchensur)
Note: The game was originally scheduled for 22 April 2021, but because of a number of COVID-19 related postponements involving the teams of Holstein Kiel, Karlsruher SC, and SV Sandhausen, it had to be rescheduled for a day earlier to rebalance the other teams' schedules.

25 April 2021 31	FC St. Pauli	2−1	Greuther Fürth	Hamburg
13:30 UTC+2	Zander 10'; Burgstaller 50'	FCSP Report; Kicker Report	Stach (yellow card) 13'; Seguin (yellow card) 80', (goal) 90+3'	Stadium: Millerntor-Stadion; Attendance: 0 Referee: Timo Gerach (Landau)

7 May 2021 32	Holstein Kiel	4−0	FC St. Pauli	Kiel
18:30 UTC+2	Arslan (yellow card) 13', (goal) 22'; Bartels 24', 49'; Lorenz (yellow card) 55'; Serra 67'	FCSP Report; Kicker Report		Stadium: Holstein-Stadion; Attendance: 0 Referee: Frank Willenborg (Osnabrück)

16 May 2021 33	FC St. Pauli	1−2	Hannover 96	Hamburg
15:30 UTC+2	Zander (yellow card) 20'; Lawrence (yellow card) 53' (yellow-red card) 80'; Burgstaller 70'; Benatelli (yellow card) 74'	FCSP Report; Kicker Report	Ducksch 13'; Bijol (yellow card) 50'; Hult 59'; Hansen (yellow card) 90+1'	Stadium: Millerntor-Stadion; Attendance: 0 Referee: Lasse Koslowski (Berlin)

23 May 2021 34	Jahn Regensburg	3−0	FC St. Pauli	Regensburg
15:30 UTC+2	George 14'; Albers 44'; Stolze 64'	FCSP Report; Kicker Report	Buballa (yellow card) 22' (yellow-red card) 82'; Dźwigała (yellow card) 48'	Stadium: Arena Regensburg; Attendance: 0 Referee: Martin Thomsen (Kleve)

=== DFB-Pokal ===
13 September 2020 First round	SV Elversberg	4−2	FC St. Pauli	Spiesen-Elversberg
15:30 UTC+2	Schnellbacher 16', 67'; Dragon 26'; Fellhauer 48'; Neubauer (yellow card) 66'; Suero (penalty missed) 73'; Conrad (yellow card) 82'	FCSP Report; Kicker Report	Knoll 7'; Ohlsson (yellow card) 47'; Dittgen (yellow card) 57'; Tashchy (yellow card) 59'; Benatelli 78'	Stadium: Ursapharm-Arena an der Kaiserlinde; Attendance: 500; Referee: Timo Gerach (Landau)

== Squad and statistics ==
As of 23 May 2021

No.	Pos	Player	2. Bundesliga		DFB-Pokal		Total	
No.	Pos	Player	Apps	Goals	Apps	Goals	Apps	Goals
1	GK	(Germany) Dennis Smarsch	1	0	0	0	1	0
2	DF	(Sweden) Sebastian Ohlsson	23	0	1	0	24	0
3	DF	(Wales) James Lawrence	17+2	0	0	0	19	0
4	DF	(Germany) Philipp Ziereis	25+1	0	1	0	27	0
5	DF	(Germany) Marvin Knoll	9+5	0	1	1	15	1
6	MF	(Germany) Christopher Avevor	5+1	0	1	0	7	0
8	MF	(Uruguay) Rodrigo Zalazar	32+2	6	0+1	0	35	6
9	FW	(Austria) Guido Burgstaller	20+2	11	0	0	22	11
10	MF	(Germany) Christopher Buchtmann	0+2	0	0	0	2	0
11	MF	(Germany) Maximilian Dittgen	12+20	3	1	0	33	3
12	MF	(Japan) Ryo Miyaichi	0+1	0	0	0	1	0
13	MF	(Germany) Lukas Daschner	2+22	0	0+1	0	25	0
14	MF	(Nigeria) Afeez Aremu	4+12	0	1	0	17	0
15	DF	(Germany) Daniel Buballa	15+6	1	0	0	21	1
16	FW	(Denmark) Simon Makienok	9+9	2	0+1	0	19	2
17	FW	(Germany) Daniel-Kofi Kyereh	33+1	9	1	0	35	9
18	MF	(Sweden) Eric Smith	4+1	0	0	0	5	0
19	DF	(Germany) Luca-Milan Zander	13+9	3	0	0	22	3
20	MF	(Germany) Finn Ole Becker	27+3	1	0	0	30	1
21	GK	(North Macedonia) Dejan Stojanović	19	0	0	0	19	0
22	FW	(Egypt) Omar Marmoush	19+2	7	0	0	21	7
23	DF	(Kosovo) Leart Paqarada	28+2	1	1	0	31	1
24	DF	(Norway) Tore Reginiussen	3+7	0	0	0	10	0
25	DF	(Poland) Adam Dźwigała	6+7	0	0	0	13	0
26	MF	(Germany) Rico Benatelli	23+3	3	0+1	1	27	4
29	MF	(Germany) Christian Viet	1+2	0	0	0	3	0
32	DF	(Germany) Jannes Wieckhoff	2+5	1	0+1	0	8	1
33	GK	(Germany) Svend Brodersen	4	0	0	0	4	0
34	FW	(Germany) Igor Matanović	2+16	1	0	0	18	1
36	FW	(Dominican Republic) Luis Coordes	0	0	0	0	0	0
Players transferred or loaned out during the season
7	MF	(Germany) Kevin Lankford	4+5	0	0	0	9	0
24	FW	(Ukraine) Borys Tashchy	1+8	0	1	0	10	0
28	DF	(Germany) Marvin Senger	0	0	1	0	1	0
30	GK	(Germany) Robin Himmelmann	10	0	1	0	11	0
38	MF	(United States) Leon Flach	0+9	1	0	0	9	1
