= 2021–22 FC St. Pauli season =

FC St. Pauli
2021–22 season
- President: Oke Göttlich
- Manager: Timo Schultz
- Stadium: Millerntor-Stadion
- 2. Bundesliga: 5th
- DFB-Pokal: Quarterfinals
- Top goalscorer: League: Guido Burgstaller (18); All: Guido Burgstaller (20)
Home colours	Away colours	Third colours

The 2021–22 FC St. Pauli season is the 111th season in the football club's history and 11th consecutive season in the second division of German football, the 2. Bundesliga and 29th overall. In addition to the domestic league, FC St. Pauli also are participating in this season's edition of the DFB-Pokal. This is the 59th season for FC St. Pauli in the Millerntor-Stadion, located in St. Pauli, Hamburg, Germany. The season covers a period from 1 July 2021 to 30 June 2022.

== Players ==
=== Squad information ===
As of 25 July 2021

Note: Flags indicate national team as defined under FIFA eligibility rules; some limited exceptions apply. Players may hold more than one non-FIFA nationality.

No.	Pos.	Nation	Player
1	GK	GER	Dennis Smarsch
2	DF	SWE	Sebastian Ohlsson
3	DF	WAL	James Lawrence (vice-captain)
4	DF	GER	Philipp Ziereis (captain)
6	DF	GER	Christopher Avevor
7	MF	AUS	Jackson Irvine
8	MF	SWE	Eric Smith
9	FW	AUT	Guido Burgstaller
10	MF	GER	Christopher Buchtmann
11	MF	GER	Maximilian Dittgen
13	MF	GER	Lukas Daschner
14	MF	NGA	Afeez Aremu
15	DF	GER	Marcel Beifus
16	FW	DEN	Simon Makienok
17	FW	GER	Daniel-Kofi Kyereh

No.	Pos.	Nation	Player
18	DF	CRO	Jakov Medić
19	DF	GER	Luca-Milan Zander
20	MF	GER	Finn Ole Becker
21	DF	GER	Lars Ritzka
22	GK	BIH	Nikola Vasilj
23	DF	KOS	Leart Paqarada
25	DF	POL	Adam Dźwigała
26	MF	GER	Rico Benatelli
27	FW	TOG	Etienne Amenyido
28	GK	GER	Sören Ahlers
30	MF	GER	Marcel Hartel
31	MF	GER	Franz Roggow
32	DF	GER	Jannes Wieckhoff
34	FW	GER	Igor Matanović

=== Transfers ===
==== Summer ====
In:

No.	Pos.	Nation	Player
7	MF	AUS	Jackson Irvine (from Hibernian)
8	MF	SWE	Eric Smith (from Gent, previously on loan)
15	DF	GER	Marcel Beifus (from VfL Wolfsburg)
18	DF	CRO	Jakov Medić (from SV Wehen Wiesbaden)
21	DF	GER	Lars Ritzka (from SC Verl)
22	GK	BIH	Nikola Vasilj (from Zorya Luhansk)
27	FW	TOG	Etienne Amenyido (from VfL Osnabrück)
28	GK	GER	Sören Ahlers (from FC Schalke 04 II)
30	MF	GER	Marcel Hartel (from Arminia Bielefeld)
34	FW	GER	Igor Matanović (on loan from Eintracht Frankfurt)

Out:

No.	Pos.	Nation	Player
7	MF	GER	Kevin Lankford (to SV Wehen Wiesbaden, previously on loan)
8	MF	URU	Rodrigo Zalazar (loan return to Eintracht Frankfurt)
12	MF	JPN	Ryo Miyaichi (released to Yokohama F. Marinos)
15	DF	GER	Daniel Buballa (released to FC Viktoria Köln)
21	GK	MKD	Dejan Stojanović (loan return to Middlesbrough)
22	FW	EGY	Omar Marmoush (loan return to VfL Wolfsburg)
22	MF	GER	Maximilian Franzke (to 1. FC Magdeburg, previously on loan)
24	DF	NOR	Tore Reginiussen (retired)
29	MF	GER	Christian Viet (on loan at Borussia Dortmund II)
31	MF	GER	Ersin Zehir (released to Antalyaspor, previously on loan at VfB Lübeck)
33	GK	GER	Svend Brodersen (released to Yokohama FC)
34	FW	GER	Igor Matanović (to Eintracht Frankfurt)
38	DF	GER	Florian Carstens (to SV Wehen Wiesbaden, previously on loan)
—	DF	POL	Jakub Bednarczyk (to FC St. Pauli II, previously on loan at Zagłębie Lubin)
—	DF	KOR	Park Yi-young (to FC St. Pauli II, previously on loan at Türkgücü München)

==== Winter ====
In:

No.	Pos.	Nation	Player

Out:

No.	Pos.	Nation	Player
5	MF	GER	Marvin Knoll (to MSV Duisburg)
36	MF	DOM	Luis Coordes (to VfB Stuttgart II)

== Matches ==
Legend

Win Draw Loss

=== Friendly matches ===
26 June 2021 Friendly	Hannover 96	0−2	FC St. Pauli	Hanover
15:00 UTC+2	Hansen (yellow card); Twumasi (yellow card)	Report	Becker 36'; Makienok 75'	Stadium: HDI-Arena; Attendance: 0 Referee: Eric Müller (Bremen)

30 June 2021 Friendly	Blau-Weiß Lohne	0−4	FC St. Pauli	Lohne
16:00 UTC+2		Report	Burgstaller 42'; Dittgen 65'; Makienok 78'; Daschner 87'	Stadium: Heinz-Dettmer-Stadion; Attendance: 600; Referee: Theodor Potiyenko (Hude)

3 July 2021 Friendly	PEC Zwolle	cancelled	FC St. Pauli	Herzlake
16:00 UTC+2		Report		Stadium: Hasetalstadion

10 July 2021 Friendly	Odense	2−2	FC St. Pauli	Norderstedt
13:00 UTC+2	Þrándarson 49'; Kadrii 59'; Lieder (yellow card)		Makienok 41'; Daschner 69'; Ziereis (yellow card); Smith (yellow card)	Stadium: Edmund-Plambeck-Stadion; Attendance: 600; Referee: Simon Rott (Bremen)

17 July 2021 Friendly	FC St. Pauli	2−2	Hertha BSC	Hamburg
16:00 UTC+2	Kyereh 44'; Makienok 45+2'; Zander (yellow card)	Report	Stark 45'; Serdar 49'; Ascacíbar (yellow card)	Stadium: Millerntor-Stadion; Attendance: 2,500; Referee: Adrian Höhns (Hamburg)

7 October 2021 Friendly	SC Freiburg	3–0	FC St. Pauli	Freiburg im Breisgau
18:15 UTC+2	Grifo 17', 29'; Burkart 68'	Report		Stadium: Europa-Park Stadion; Attendance: 15,000; Referee: Matthias Jöllenbeck (Freiburg im Breisgau)

11 November 2021 Friendly	Viborg	2−2	FC St. Pauli	Norderstedt
14:00 UTC+2	Bonde 25'; Jatta 50'; Berger Brix (yellow card); Mensah (yellow card); Leemans (yellow card); Aaquist (yellow card)	Report	Burgstaller 4'; Ziereis 90+1'; Smith (yellow card)	Stadium: Edmund-Plambeck-Stadion; Attendance: 200; Referee: Adrian Höhns (Dassendorf)

8 January 2022 Friendly	FC St. Pauli	2−0	Beerschot	Benidorm, Spain
11:30 UTC+2	Buchtmann 82'; Dittgen 95'; Beifus (yellow card); Dźwigała (yellow card)	Report		Stadium: Estadio Municipal Guillermo Amor
Note: The game was played in four quarters of 30 minutes each.

28 January 2022 Friendly	Holstein Kiel	3−3	FC St. Pauli	Kiel
14:00 UTC+2	Reese 9'; Korb 23'; Benger 54'	Report	Dittgen 48', 53'; Makienok 60'	Stadium: CITTI Fussball Park; Attendance: 0 Referee: Patrick Schwengers (Travemünde)

=== 2. Bundesliga ===
==== League table ====
Pos	Team	Pld	W	D	L	GF	GA	GD	Pts	Promotion, qualification or relegation
3	Hamburger SV	34	16	12	6	67	35	+32	60	Qualification for promotion play-offs
4	Darmstadt 98	34	18	6	10	71	46	+25	60	
5	FC St. Pauli	34	16	9	9	61	46	+15	57	
6	1. FC Heidenheim	34	15	7	12	43	45	−2	52	
7	SC Paderborn	34	13	12	9	56	44	+12	51	

Source: DFB
Rules for classification: 1) Points; 2) Goal difference; 3) Goals scored; 4) Head-to-head points; 5) Head-to-head goal difference; 6) Head-to-head away goals scored; 7) Away goals scored; 8) Play-off.

==== Results summary ====
Overall								Home						Away					
Pld	W	D	L	GF	GA	GD	Pts	W	D	L	GF	GA	GD	W	D	L	GF	GA	GD
34	16	9	9	61	46	+15	57	11	4	2	37	17	+20	5	5	7	24	29	−5

Last updated: 15 May 2022.
Source: Kicker

==== Results by round ====
Round	1	2	3	4	5	6	7	8	9	10	11	12	13	14	15	16	17	18	19	20	21	22	23	24	25	26	27	28	29	30	31	32	33	34
Ground	H	A	H	A	H	A	H	A	H	A	H	A	H	A	A	H	A	A	H	A	H	A	H	A	H	A	H	A	H	A	H	H	A	H
Result	W	D	W	L	W	L	W	W	W	W	W	D	W	L	W	W	D	L	D	L	D	W	L	W	W	D	W	L	D	D	L	D	L	W
Position	2	4	4	5	4	5	3	2	1	1	1	1	1	1	1	1	1	1	1	2	2	1	4	3	3	2	1	3	3	3	4	5	5	5

Updated to match(es) played on 15 May 2022. Source: Kicker
A = Away; H = Home; W = Win; D = Draw; L = Loss

==== Results ====
25 July 2021 1	FC St. Pauli	3−0	Holstein Kiel	Hamburg
13:30 UTC+2	Paqarada 11'; Kyereh 62'; Burgstaller 90+1'	FCSP Report; Kicker Report	Mühling (yellow card) 39'	Stadium: Millerntor-Stadion; Attendance: 8,900; Referee: Arne Aarnink (Nordhorn)

1 August 2021 2	Erzgebirge Aue	0−0	FC St. Pauli	Aue
13:30 UTC+2	Carlson (yellow card) 30'	FCSP Report; Kicker Report	Medić (yellow card) 9'; Smith (yellow card) 73'	Stadium: Erzgebirgsstadion; Attendance: 6,828; Referee: Florian Heft (Neuenkirchen)

13 August 2021 3	FC St. Pauli	3–2	Hamburger SV	Hamburg
18:30 UTC+2	Paqarada (yellow card) 5'; Becker 27'; Makienok 56', 58'; Dźwigała (yellow card) 84'	FCSP Report; Kicker Report	Schonlau (yellow card) 2'; Kittel 43'; Kinsombi (yellow card) 66'; Glatzel 77'; Kaufmann (yellow card) 90'	Stadium: Millerntor-Stadion; Attendance: 10,003; Referee: Harm Osmers (Hannover)

21 August 2021 4	SC Paderborn 07	3−1	FC St. Pauli	Paderborn
13:30 UTC+2	Srbeny (penalty missed) 8'; Dźwigała 45' (o.g.); Pröger 65'; Michel (yellow card) 69', (goal) 90+3'	FCSP Report; Kicker Report	Ziereis (red card) 6'; Burgstaller 28'; Smith (yellow card) 42'	Stadium: Benteler-Arena; Attendance: 6,000; Referee: Benjamin Brand (Unterspiesheim)

29 August 2021 5	FC St. Pauli	2−0	Jahn Regensburg	Hamburg
13:30 UTC+2	Burgstaller 74', 89', (yellow card) 82'	FCSP Report; Kicker Report	Singh (yellow card) 59'; Gimber (yellow card) 90'	Stadium: Millerntor-Stadion; Attendance: 10,003; Referee: Sven Waschitzki (Essen)

11 September 2021 6	Hannover 96	1−0	FC St. Pauli	Hanover
13:30 UTC+2	Dehm (yellow card) 10'; Onouda (yellow card) 25'; Kerk 39'; Ernst (yellow card) 74'	FCSP Report; Kicker Report	Burgstaller (yellow card) 10'; Aremu (yellow card) 57'; Kyereh (yellow card) 86'	Stadium: HDI-Arena; Attendance: 16,100; Referee: Florian Lechner (Hornstorf)

19 September 2021 7	FC St. Pauli	4−1	FC Ingolstadt 04	Hamburg
13:30 UTC+2	Zander 34'; Dittgen 50'; Burgstaller 61'; Buchtmann 73'	FCSP Report; Kicker Report	Röhl 72', (yellow card) 83'	Stadium: Millerntor-Stadion; Attendance: 13,917; Referee: Frank Willenborg (Osnabrück)

25 September 2021 8	Karlsruher SC	1−3	FC St. Pauli	Karlsruhe
13:30 UTC+2	Eichner (yellow card) 44'; P. Hofmann (yellow card) 53'; Choi (yellow card) 55'; Bormuth (yellow card) 55'; Schleusener 79'; Thiede (yellow card) 85'; Kobald (yellow card) 88'; Batmaz (yellow card) 90+3'	FCSP Report; Kicker Report	Gersbeck 13' (o.g.); Burgstaller 45' (pen.); Kyereh 58'; Irvine (yellow card) 71'; Hartel (yellow card) 72'	Stadium: Wildparkstadion; Attendance: 12,500; Referee: Nicolas Winter (Hagenbach)

3 October 2021 9	FC St. Pauli	3−0	Dynamo Dresden	Hamburg
13:30 UTC+2	Buchtmann 1'; Burgstaller 73' (pen.); Zander (yellow card) 82'; Beifus 90+3'	FCSP Report; Kicker Report	Königsdörffer (yellow card) 63'; Giorbelidze (yellow card) 69'	Stadium: Millerntor-Stadion; Attendance: 14,773; Referee: Bastian Dankert (Rostock)

16 October 2021 10	1. FC Heidenheim	2–4	FC St. Pauli	Heidenheim an der Brenz
13:30 UTC+2	Mohr 4'; Kühlwetter (yellow card) 38'; Kleindienst (yellow card) 68', (goal) 85'; Pick (yellow card) 83'	FCSP Report; Kicker Report	Burgstaller 55', 60'; Dittgen 56', 81'; Irvine (yellow card) 67'; Medić (yellow card) 75'	Stadium: Voith-Arena; Attendance: 8,013; Referee: Benjamin Brand (Unterspiesheim)

24 October 2021 11	FC St. Pauli	4−0	FC Hansa Rostock	Hamburg
13:30 UTC+2	Irvine 12'; Kyereh 18'; Burgstaller 61'; Makienok 78'	FCSP Report; Kicker Report	Verhoek (yellow card) 26'; Rother (yellow card) 49'	Stadium: Millerntor-Stadion; Attendance: 22,006; Referee: Harm Osmers (Hanover)

30 October 2021 12	Werder Bremen	1−1	FC St. Pauli	Bremen
13:30 UTC+1	Friedl (yellow card) 24'; Ducksch (yellow card) 51', (goal) 62'; Rapp (yellow card) 53'; Schönfelder (yellow card) 88'	FCSP Report; Kicker Report	Medić (yellow card) 14'; Becker 67'; Burgstaller (yellow card) 83'	Stadium: Weser-Stadion; Attendance: 42,100; Referee: Felix Zwayer (Berlin)

20 November 2021 14	Darmstadt 98	4−0	FC St. Pauli	Darmstadt
13:30 UTC+1	Tietz 6'; Manu 29'; Pfeiffer 39', 41'; Gjasula (yellow card) 45+1'; Bader (yellow card) 63'; Celic (yellow card) 71'	FCSP Report; Kicker Report	Zander (yellow card) 18'	Stadium: Merck-Stadion am Böllenfalltor; Attendance: 13,000; Referee: Tobias Reichel (Stuttgart)

24 November 2021 13	FC St. Pauli	3−1	SV Sandhausen	Hamburg
18:30 UTC+1	Burgstaller 2'; Kyereh 14', 79'; Dźwigała (yellow card) 75'	FCSP Report; Kicker Report	Ajdini (yellow card) 42'; Höhn 67', (yellow card) 87'; Zenga (yellow card) 90+7'	Stadium: Millerntor-Stadion; Attendance: 23,401; Referee: Max Burda (Berlin)
Note: The game was originally scheduled for 7 November 2021, but because a number of SV Sandhausen players tested positive for COVID-19, the game has been postponed after the team has been sent into a preventive quarantine until further notice. The Deutsche Fußball Liga rescheduled the game for 24 November.

28 November 2021 15	1. FC Nürnberg	2−3	FC St. Pauli	Nuremberg
13:30 UTC+1	Geis 21'; Schäffler 72'	FCSP Report; Kicker Report	Burgstaller 3', (yellow card) 90'; Paqarada 10'; Dźwigała 64'; Hartel (yellow card) 90+3'	Stadium: Max-Morlock-Stadion; Attendance: 8,479; Referee: Sven Waschitzki (Essen)

4 December 2021 16	FC St. Pauli	2−1	Schalke 04	Hamburg
20:30 UTC+1	Kyereh (yellow card) 2'; Burgstaller 20', 39'	FCSP Report; Kicker Report	Thiaw (yellow card) 26'; Zalazar 75', (yellow card) 90+3'	Stadium: Millerntor-Stadion; Attendance: 19,950; Referee: Marco Fritz (Korb)

11 December 2021 17	Fortuna Düsseldorf	1−1	FC St. Pauli	Düsseldorf
20:30 UTC+1	Nedelcu (yellow card) 23'; Hennings 68'; Piotrowksi (yellow card) 71'	FCSP Report; Kicker Report	Smith (yellow card) 26'; Hartel 47'	Stadium: Esprit Arena; Attendance: 15,000; Referee: Thorben Siewer (Olpe)

17 December 2021 18	Holstein Kiel	3−0	FC St. Pauli	Kiel
18:30 UTC+1	Bartels 8'; Porath 29'; Pichler 45+1'; Thesker (yellow card) 56'; Arp (yellow card) 90'	FCSP Report; Kicker Report	Ziereis (yellow card) 56'; Paqarada (yellow card) 80'; Dittgen (yellow card) 86'	Stadium: Holstein-Stadion; Attendance: 8,700; Referee: Robin Braun (Wuppertal)

15 January 2022 19	FC St. Pauli	2−2	Erzgebirge Aue	Hamburg
13:30 UTC+1	Medić 30'; Amenyido 90+3'	FCSP Report; Kicker Report	Zolinski 17'; Trujić 72', (yellow card) 76'	Stadium: Millerntor-Stadion; Attendance: 1,724; Referee: Patrick Alt (Illingen)

21 January 2022 20	Hamburger SV	2−1	FC St. Pauli	Hamburg
18:30 UTC+1	Schonlau 58'; Walter (yellow card) 63'; Kittel (yellow card) 66'; Jatta 70'; Reis (yellow card) 78'	FCSP Report; Kicker Report	Amenyido (yellow card) 26'; Burgstaller 30'; Lawrence (yellow card) 45+3'; Hartel (yellow card) 65'; Benatelli (yellow card) 90+4'	Stadium: Volksparkstadion; Attendance: 2,000; Referee: Sascha Stegemann (Niederkassel)

5 February 2022 21	FC St. Pauli	2−2	SC Paderborn 07	Hamburg
20:30 UTC+1	Dittgen 5'; Amenyido 44'; Smith (yellow card) 74'	FCSP Report; Kicker Report	Srbeny 37'; Thalhammer (yellow card) 83'; Stiepermann 84'	Stadium: Millerntor-Stadion; Attendance: 6,000; Referee: Deniz Aytekin (Oberasbach)

12 February 2022 22	Jahn Regensburg	2−3	FC St. Pauli	Regensburg
20:30 UTC+2	Meyer (yellow card) 45+2'; Albers 56'; Otto 73'	FCSP Report; Kicker Report	Amenyido 7'; Burgstaller 11' (pen.); Kyereh 66', (yellow card) 76'; Paqarada (yellow card) 84'	Stadium: Arena Regensburg; Attendance: 7,605; Referee: Nicolas Winter (Hagenbach)

20 February 2022 23	FC St. Pauli	0−3	Hannover 96	Hamburg
13:30 UTC+1	Becker (yellow card) 16'; Kyereh (penalty missed) 81'	FCSP Report; Kicker Report	Kaiser 40'; Dehm (yellow card) 41'; Kerk 57'; Börner (yellow card) 60'; Stolze 72'; Dabrowski (yellow card) 82'	Stadium: Millerntor-Stadion; Attendance: 8,470; Referee: Bastian Dankert (Rostock)

26 February 2022 24	FC Ingolstadt 04	1−3	FC St. Pauli	Ingolstadt
13:30 UTC+1	Eckert 34'; Pick (yellow card) 76'; Bilbija (yellow card) 79'; Schmidt (yellow card) 90+4'	FCSP Report; Kicker Report	Kyereh 22'; Burgstaller 37'; Makienok 55'; Hartel (yellow card) 57'; Aremu (yellow card) 65'	Stadium: Audi Sportpark; Attendance: 5,511; Referee: Robin Braun (Wuppertal)

5 March 2022 25	FC St. Pauli	3−1	Karlsruher SC	Hamburg
13:30 UTC+1	Kyereh 14', 25', (yellow card) 65'; Makienok 34'; Zander (yellow card) 52'; Irvine (yellow card) 64'; Aremu (yellow card) 83'	FCSP Report; Kicker Report	Kobald (yellow card) 42'; Wanitzek (yellow card) 45'; P. Hofmann 66'	Stadium: Millerntor-Stadion; Attendance: 22,158; Referee: Tobias Reichel (Stuttgart)

12 March 2022 26	Dynamo Dresden	1−1	FC St. Pauli	Dresden
13:30 UTC+1	Daferner 20'	FCSP Report; Kicker Report	Makienok 42'	Stadium: Rudolf-Harbig-Stadion; Attendance: 16,000; Referee: Daniel Siebert (Berlin)

18 March 2022 27	FC St. Pauli	1−0	1. FC Heidenheim	Hamburg
18:30 UTC+1	Makienok (yellow card) 33'; Beifus (yellow card) 51'; Kyereh 67'; Vasilj (yellow card) 90+1'	FCSP Report; Kicker Report	Kühlwetter (yellow card) 25'; Burnić (yellow card) 43'; Geipl (yellow card) 56'	Stadium: Millerntor-Stadion; Attendance: 27,433; Referee: Bastian Dankert (Rostock)

2 April 2022 28	FC Hansa Rostock	1−0	FC St. Pauli	Rostock
20:30 UTC+2	Verhoek (yellow card) 10'; Malone (yellow card) 12'; Neidhart 59'	FCSP Report; Kicker Report		Stadium: Ostseestadion; Attendance: 24,770; Referee: Benjamin Brand (Unterspiesheim)

9 April 2022 29	FC St. Pauli	1−1	Werder Bremen	Hamburg
13:30 UTC+2	Kyereh 43'; Ziereis (yellow card) 84'	FCSP Report; Kicker Report	Füllkrug 58'	Stadium: Millerntor-Stadion; Attendance: 29,546; Referee: Florian Badstübner (Windsbach)

16 April 2022 30	SV Sandhausen	1−1	FC St. Pauli	Sandhausen
13:30 UTC+2	Seufert (yellow card) 80'; Bachmann 90+1'	FCSP Report; Kicker Report	Burgstaller 39' (pen.)	Stadium: BWT-Stadion am Hardtwald; Attendance: 7,094; Referee: Felix Brych (Munich)

23 April 2022 31	FC St. Pauli	1−2	Darmstadt 98	Hamburg
20:30 UTC+2	Irvine (yellow card) 18'; Hartel (yellow card) 49'; Daschner 81'; Ziereis (yellow card) 90+5'	FCSP Report; Kicker Report	Pfeiffer 9'; Holland 35'; Skarke (yellow card) 43'; Tietz (yellow card) 86'; Honsak (yellow card) 90+2'; Isherwood (yellow card) 90+5'	Stadium: Millerntor-Stadion; Attendance: 29,546; Referee: Sascha Stegemann (Niederkassel)

29 April 2022 32	FC St. Pauli	1−1	1. FC Nürnberg	Hamburg
18:30 UTC+2	Aremu (yellow card) 26'; Becker (yellow card) 40'; Kyereh 74' (pen.)	FCSP Report; Kicker Report	Duman 90+2'	Stadium: Millerntor-Stadion; Attendance: 29,312; Referee: Bastian Dankert (Rostock)

7 May 2022 33	Schalke 04	3−2	FC St. Pauli	Gelsenkirchen
20:30 UTC+2	Latza (yellow card) 41'; Terodde 47' (pen.), 70'; Vindheim (yellow card) 51'; Zalazar 78'; Idrizi (yellow card) 90+6'	FCSP Report; Kicker Report	Matanović 9', 17', (yellow card) 90' (yellow-red card) 90+5'; Aremu (yellow card) 15'; Medić (yellow card) 46'; Kyereh (yellow card) 65'; Beifus (red card) 81'	Stadium: Veltins-Arena; Attendance: 62,271; Referee: Marco Fritz (Korb)

15 May 2022 34	FC St. Pauli	2−0	Fortuna Düsseldorf	Hamburg
15:30 UTC+2	Buchtmann (yellow card) 20'; Hartel 65'; Dźwigała 83'; Irvine (yellow card) 85'	FCSP Report; Kicker Report	Piotrowski (yellow card) 50'; Koutris (yellow card) 60'	Stadium: Millerntor-Stadion; Attendance: 29,546; Referee: Matthias Jöllenbeck (Freiburg im Breisgau)

=== DFB-Pokal ===
7 August 2021 First round	1. FC Magdeburg	2–3	FC St. Pauli	Magdeburg
18:30 UTC+2	Conteh 31', 54'; Atik (yellow card) 49'; Reimann (yellow card) 66'; Bittroff (yellow card) 85'	FCSP Report; Kicker Report	Burgstaller 4', 58'; Zander (yellow card) 13'; Medić 40'; Makienok (yellow card) 42'; Aremu (yellow card) 74'; Dittgen (yellow card) 90+3'	Stadium: MDCC-Arena; Attendance: 14,405; Referee: Robert Schröder (Hanover)

27 October 2021 Second round	Dynamo Dresden	2−3 (a.e.t.)	FC St. Pauli	Dresden
18:30 UTC+1	Herrmann (yellow card) 45+3'; Mörschel (yellow card) 61'; Daferner 66', (yellow card) 117'; Ziereis 73' (o.g.); Akoto (yellow card) 101'; Seo (yellow card) 112'	FCSP Report; Kicker Report	Kyereh (yellow card) 45+3'; Paqarada 63'; Dittgen 72'; Zander (yellow card) 82'; Buchtmann 101', (yellow card) 116'; Dźwigała (yellow card) 105+1'	Stadium: Rudolf-Harbig-Stadion; Attendance: 16,000; Referee: Sven Waschitzki (Essen)

18 January 2022 Round of 16	FC St. Pauli	2−1	Borussia Dortmund	Hamburg
20:45 UTC+1	Amenyido 4'; Witsel 40' (o.g.)	FCSP Report; Kicker Report	Haaland 58' (pen.)	Stadium: Millerntor-Stadion; Attendance: 2,000; Referee: Harm Osmers (Hannover)

1 March 2022 Quarter-finals	Union Berlin	2−1	FC St. Pauli	Berlin
20:45 UTC+1	Becker 45', (yellow card) 63'; Voglsammer 75'; Khedira (yellow card) 78'	FCSP Report; Kicker Report	Kyereh 21'	Stadium: Stadion An der Alten Försterei; Attendance: 10,000; Referee: Florian Badstübner (Windsbach)

== Squad and statistics ==
As of 15 May 2022

No.	Pos	Player	2. Bundesliga		DFB-Pokal		Total	
No.	Pos	Player	Apps	Goals	Apps	Goals	Apps	Goals
1	GK	(Germany) Dennis Smarsch	1	0	4	0	5	0
2	DF	(Sweden) Sebastian Ohlsson	4+3	0	1	0	8	0
3	DF	(Wales) James Lawrence	10+8	0	1+2	0	21	0
4	DF	(Germany) Philipp Ziereis	23+1	0	1	0	25	0
6	MF	(Germany) Christopher Avevor	0	0	0	0	0	0
7	MF	(Australia) Jackson Irvine	23+5	1	3	0	31	1
8	MF	(Sweden) Eric Smith	15+2	0	2	0	19	0
9	FW	(Austria) Guido Burgstaller	31	18	4	2	35	20
10	MF	(Germany) Christopher Buchtmann	7+15	2	0+2	1	24	3
11	MF	(Germany) Maximilian Dittgen	10+13	4	2+2	1	27	5
13	MF	(Germany) Lukas Daschner	2+10	1	0	0	12	1
14	MF	(Nigeria) Afeez Aremu	14+7	0	2+1	0	24	0
15	DF	(Germany) Marcel Beifus	5+5	1	1	0	11	1
16	FW	(Denmark) Simon Makienok	12+15	6	1+2	0	30	6
17	FW	(Germany) Daniel-Kofi Kyereh	28+1	12	3	1	32	13
18	DF	(Croatia) Jakov Medić	29+1	1	4	1	34	2
19	DF	(Germany) Luca-Milan Zander	21+4	1	3+1	0	29	1
20	MF	(Germany) Finn Ole Becker	13+8	2	2+1	0	24	2
21	DF	(Germany) Lars Ritzka	1+10	0	0+1	0	12	0
22	GK	(Bosnia and Herzegovina) Nikola Vasilj	33	0	0	0	33	0
23	DF	(Kosovo) Leart Paqarada	33	2	4	1	37	3
25	DF	(Poland) Adam Dźwigała	7+14	2	0+2	0	23	2
26	MF	(Germany) Rico Benatelli	4+18	0	1+1	0	24	0
27	FW	(Togo) Etienne Amenyido	7+6	3	1+1	1	15	4
28	GK	(Germany) Sören Ahlers	0	0	0	0	0	0
30	MF	(Germany) Marcel Hartel	32	2	3	0	35	2
31	MF	(Germany) Franz Roggow	0	0	0	0	0	0
32	DF	(Germany) Jannes Wieckhoff	2	0	0	0	2	0
34	FW	(Germany) Igor Matanović	6+12	2	0+1	0	19	2
Players transferred or loaned out during the season
5	DF	(Germany) Marvin Knoll	0	0	0	0	0	0
29	MF	(Germany) Christian Viet	0+3	0	0	0	3	0
36	MF	(Dominican Republic) Luis Coordes	0	0	0	0	0	0
