= Adam Dźwigała =

Polish footballer

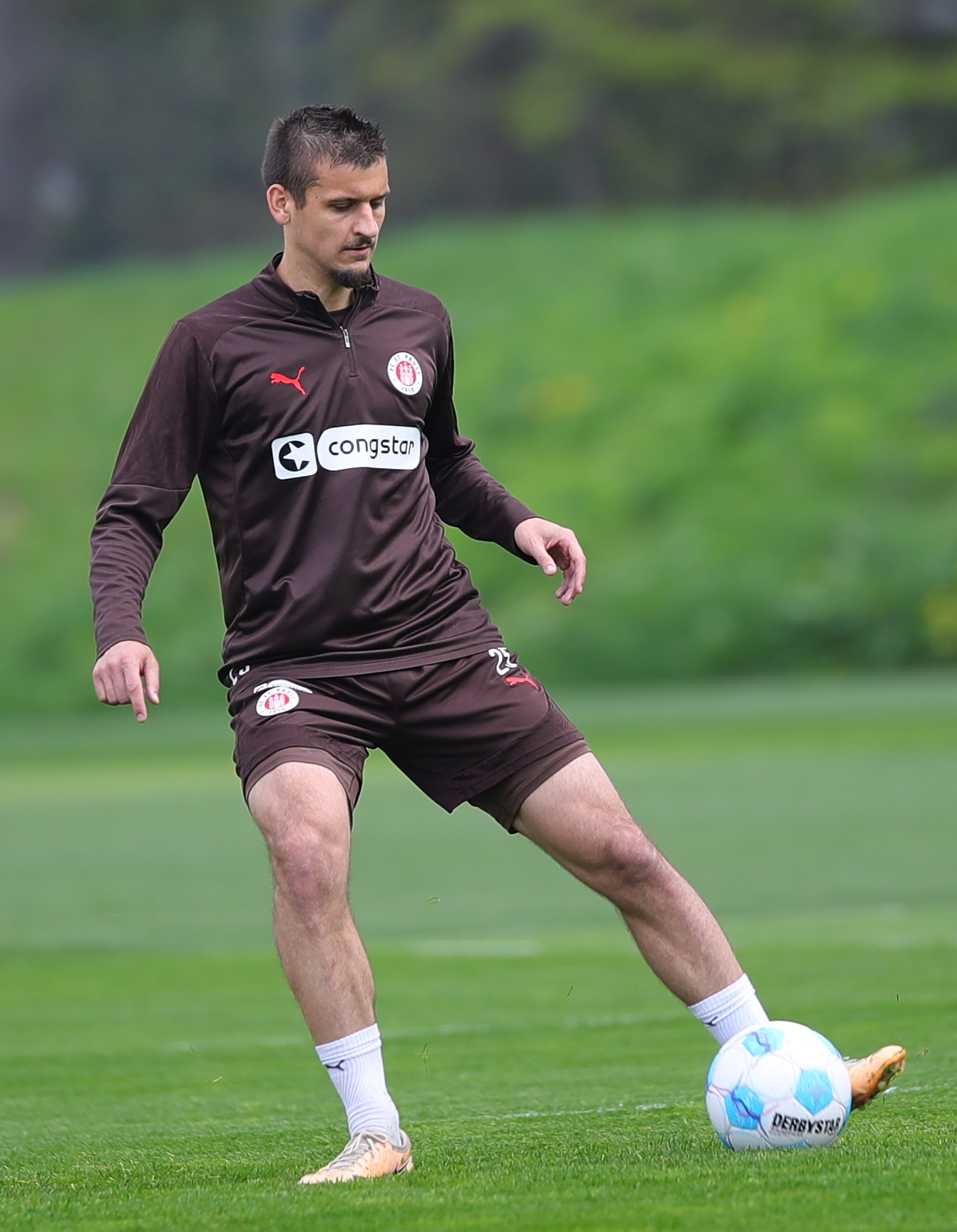
- Dźwigała in 2025 with St. Pauli

Personal information
- Date of birth: 25 September 1995 (age 31)
- Place of birth: Warsaw, Poland
- Height: 1.85 m (6 ft 1 in)
- Position: Centre-back

Team information
- Current team: St. Pauli
- Number: 25

Youth career
- –2010: KS Wesoła
- 2010–2011: Mazur Karczew
- 2011: → ŁKS Łódź (loan)
- 2012: Jagiellonia Białystok

Senior career*
Years	Team	Apps	(Gls)
2011	Mazur Karczew	6	(0)
2012–2014	Jagiellonia Białystok	37	(5)
2014–2017	Lechia Gdańsk	10	(0)
2015–2016	→ Górnik Zabrze (loan)	8	(0)
2016–2017	→ Górnik Łęczna (loan)	12	(2)
2017–2019	Wisła Płock	47	(0)
2019–2020	Aves	16	(0)
2020–	St. Pauli	108	(4)
2021	St. Pauli II	2	(0)

International career
2012–2013	Poland U18	6	(1)
2014–2015	Poland U20	4	(1)
2015	Poland U21	5	(0)
- * Club domestic league appearances and goals as of 20:30, 23 October 2026 (UTC)

Adam Dźwigała (born 25 September 1995) is a Polish professional footballer who plays as a centre-back for FC St. Pauli. He is the son of former footballer Dariusz Dźwigała.

== Club career ==
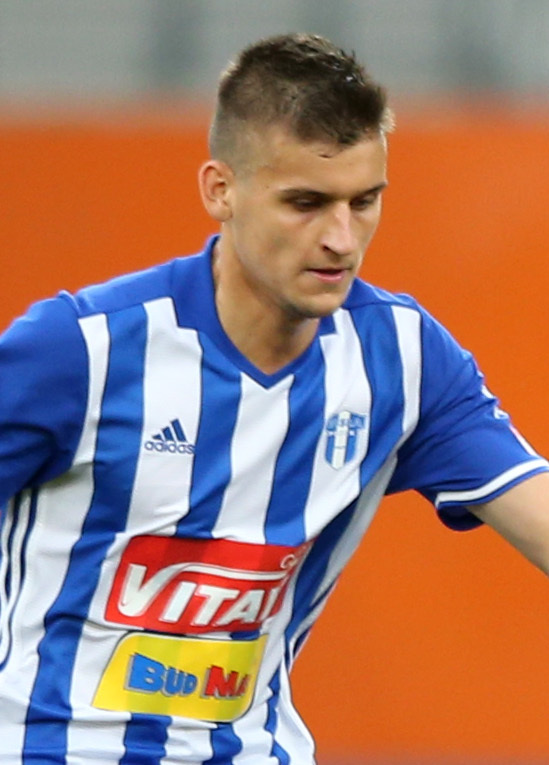
Dźwigała playing for Wisła Płock in 2017

Dźwigała played for KS Wesoła, Mazur Karczew and Łódzki KS in his youth, before moving to Jagiellonia Białystok in 2012. He made his professional debut for Białystok's first team in the Ekstraklasa on 29 September 2012 in a 1–1 draw against Pogoń Szczecin. He scored his first goal on 3 March 2013 in a 2–1 win against Górnik Zabrze and became the youngest goalscorer for Jagiellonia Białystok ever.

Prior to the 2014–15 season, Dźwigała moved to Lechia Gdańsk. For the 2015–16 season, he was loaned out to Górnik Zabrze, where he played eight league games. For the 2016–17 season, he was loaned out to Górnik Łęczna. In summer 2017, he moved to Wisła Płock on a permanent deal. In July 2019, he moved to Portugal and signed a contract with Portuguese first division club Aves. After appearing in 16 league games there, he left the club in the summer of 2020.

He joined 2. Bundesliga club FC St. Pauli as a free agent in December 2020 after trialling with the club. He played his first match for St. Pauli on 3 January 2021 against Greuther Fürth. In the 2023–24 season, he won the 2. Bundesliga title and was promoted to the Bundesliga with the club.

== International career ==
Between 2012 and 2015, Dźwigała represented Poland at the youth levels.

In August 2018, Dźwigała was called up for the Poland national team for two matches against Italy and Ireland, but did not make an appearance in either game.

== Career statistics ==
As of match played 23 October 2026

Appearances and goals by club, season and competition
Club	Season	League			National cup (Note: Includes Polish Cup, Taça de Portugal, DFB-Pokal)		Continental		Total	
Club	Season	Division	Apps	Goals	Apps	Goals	Apps	Goals	Apps	Goals
Jagiellonia Białystok	2012–13	Ekstraklasa	14	1	3	1	—		17	2
Jagiellonia Białystok	2013–14	Ekstraklasa	23	4	5	1	—		28	5
Jagiellonia Białystok	Total		37	5	8	2	—		45	7
Lechia Gdansk	2014–15	Ekstraklasa	10	0	1	0	—		11	0
Lechia Gdansk	2015–16	Ekstraklasa	0	0	1	0	—		1	0
Lechia Gdansk	Total		10	0	2	0	—		12	0
Górnik Zabrze (loan)	2015–16	Ekstraklasa	8	0	—		—		8	0
Górnik Łęczna (loan)	2016–17	Ekstraklasa	12	2	1	0	—		13	2
Wisła Płock	2017–18	Ekstraklasa	26	0	1	0	—		27	0
Wisła Płock	2018–19	Ekstraklasa	21	0	1	0	—		22	0
Wisła Płock	Total		47	0	2	0	—		49	0
Aves	2019–20	Primeira Liga	16	0	1	0	—		17	0
FC St. Pauli	2020–21	2. Bundesliga	13	0	—		—		13	0
FC St. Pauli	2021–22	2. Bundesliga	21	2	2	0	—		24	2
FC St. Pauli	2022–23	2. Bundesliga	19	1	2	0	—		21	1
FC St. Pauli	2023–24	2. Bundesliga	17	0	2	0	—		19	0
FC St. Pauli	2024–25	Bundesliga	16	0	1	1	—		17	1
FC St. Pauli	2025–26	Bundesliga	19	1	0	0	—		19	1
FC St. Pauli	2026–27	2. Bundesliga	4	0	0	0	—		4	0
FC St. Pauli	Total		109	4	7	1	—		116	5
FC St. Pauli II	2021–22	Regionalliga Nord	2	0	—		—		21	7
Career total			243	9	21	3	—		264	12

== Honours ==
FC St. Pauli

- 2. Bundesliga: 2023–24
