= Dennis Smarsch =

German footballer (born 1999)

Personal information
- Date of birth: 14 January 1999 (age 27)
- Place of birth: Berlin, Germany
- Height: 1.95 m (6 ft 5 in)
- Position: Goalkeeper

Team information
- Current team: Horsens
- Number: 23

Youth career
- FC Rehberge
- SC Borsigwalde 1910
- –2010: Reinickendorfer Füchse
- 2010–2017: Hertha BSC

Senior career*
Years	Team	Apps	(Gls)
2017–2020	Hertha BSC	2	(0)
2017–2020	Hertha BSC II	25	(0)
2020–2023	FC St. Pauli	8	(0)
2020–2023	FC St. Pauli II	14	(0)
2023–2024	MSV Duisburg	0	(0)
2024–2025	Hertha BSC II	1	(0)
2024–2025	Hertha BSC	2	(0)
2025–	Horsens	0	(0)
- * Club domestic league appearances and goals as of 21:42, 4 September 2025 (UTC)

Dennis Smarsch (born 14 January 1999) is a German professional footballer who plays as a goalkeeper for Danish Superliga club AC Horsens.

== Career ==
Smarsch joined Hertha on 27 September 2017. He made his professional debut on 24 November 2019, when he came on as a substitute after the dismissal of Rune Jarstein in the 28th minute of Hertha's 4–0 defeat at FC Augsburg; they were 2–0 down at the time he came on.

On 2 August 2020, Smarsch joined 2. Bundesliga side FC St. Pauli on a free transfer. He signed a three-year contract. After three years, he left St. Pauli in July 2023 to join MSV Duisburg. After one year, he left Duisburg to join Hertha BSC for the 2024–25 season.

On transfer deadline day, 1 September 2025, Smarsch transferred to the Danish 1st Division club AC Horsens on a deal until June 2027.

== Career statistics ==
As of match played 21 August 2021

Appearances and goals by club, season and competition
Club	Season	League			Cup		Europe		Other		Total	
Club	Season	Division	Apps	Goals	Apps	Goals	Apps	Goals	Apps	Goals	Apps	Goals
Hertha BSC	2019–20	Bundesliga	2	0	0	0	—		—		2	0
Hertha BSC II	2018–19	Regionalliga Nordost	13	0	—		—		—		13	0
Hertha BSC II	2019–20	Regionalliga Nordost	12	0	—		—		—		12	0
Hertha BSC II	Total		25	0	—		—		—		25	0
FC St. Pauli	2020–21	2. Bundesliga	1	0	0	0	—		—		1	0
FC St. Pauli	2021–22	2. Bundesliga	1	0	4	0	—		—		5	0
FC St. Pauli	2022–23	2. Bundesliga	6	0	1	0	—		—		7	0
FC St. Pauli	Total		8	0	5	0	—		—		13	0
FC St. Pauli II	2020–21	Regionalliga Nord	1	0	—		—		—		1	0
FC St. Pauli II	2021–22	Regionalliga Nord	4	0	—		—		—		4	0
FC St. Pauli II	2022–23	Regionalliga Nord	9	0	—		—		—		9	0
FC St. Pauli II	Total		14	0	—		—		—		14	0
MSV Duisburg	2023–24	3. Liga	0	0	—		—		—		0	0
Career total			49	0	5	0	0	0	0	0	54	0
