= Philipp Ziereis =

German footballer

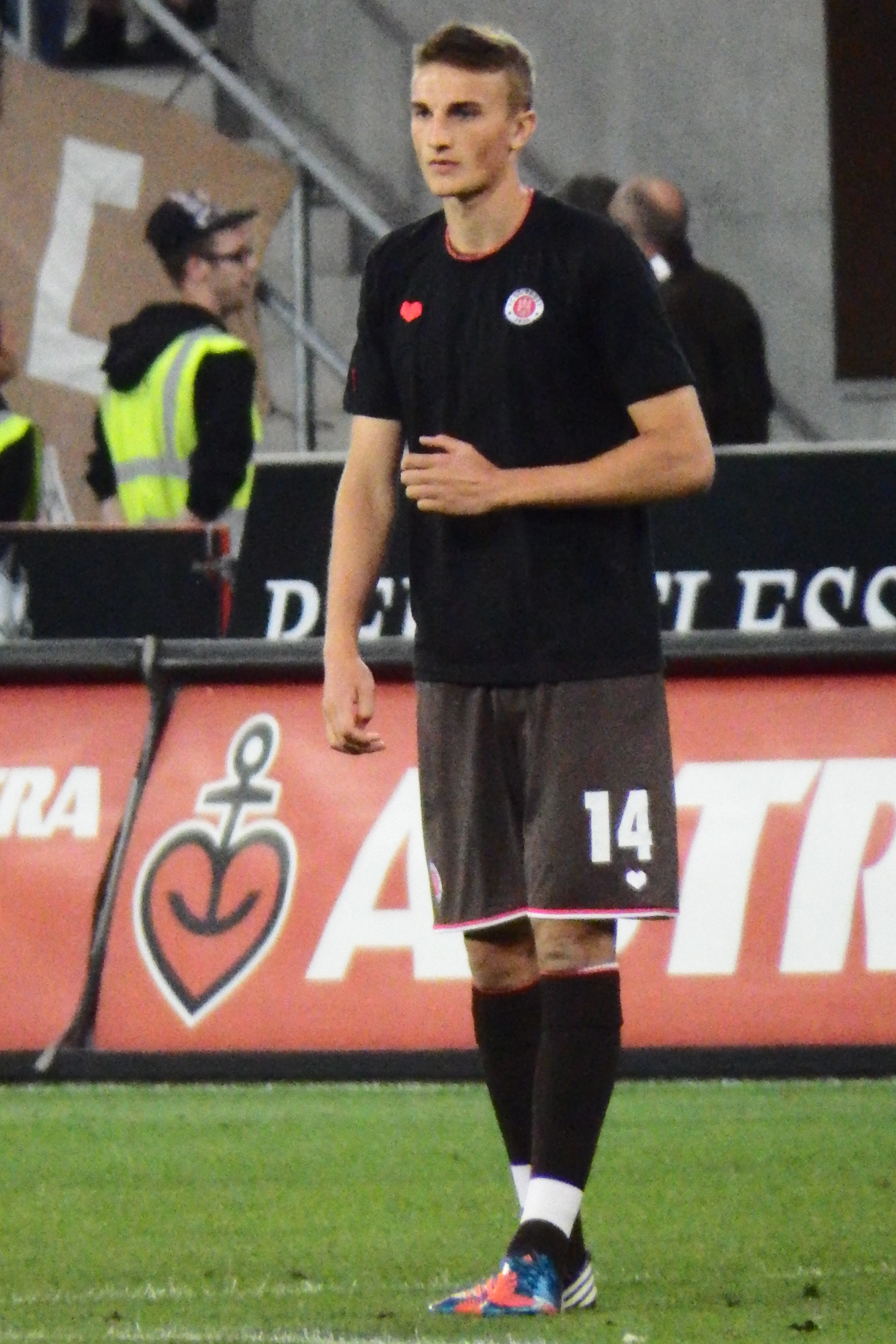
- Ziereis with FC St. Pauli in 2013

Personal information
- Date of birth: 14 March 1993 (age 33)
- Place of birth: Schwarzhofen, Germany
- Height: 1.85 m (6 ft 1 in)
- Position: Right back

Team information
- Current team: Melbourne Victory
- Number: 4

Youth career
- 1998–2007: SV Schwarzhofen
- 2007–2011: Jahn Regensburg

Senior career*
Years	Team	Apps	(Gls)
2010–2013	Jahn Regensburg	18	(1)
2013–2022	FC St. Pauli	151	(1)
2013–2020	→ FC St. Pauli II	15	(0)
2022–2025	LASK	83	(4)
2025–2026	Greuther Fürth	30	(0)
2026–	Melbourne Victory	0	(0)
- * Club domestic league appearances and goals as of 18 May 2026

Philipp Ziereis (born 14 March 1993) is a German professional footballer who plays for Australian A-League Men club Melbourne Victory.

== Career ==
Ziereis made his professional debut for SSV Jahn Regensburg during the second round of fixtures of the 2011–12 3. Liga season away to Werder Bremen II.

At the end of the 2012–13 season when Regensburg was relegated from the 2. Bundesliga, he joined FC St. Pauli.

Before the 2022–23 season, Ziereis signed a three-year contract with LASK in Austria.

On 2 June 2025, Ziereis moved to Greuther Fürth on a two-season deal.

On 10 July 2026, Ziereis signed a two-season contract with Melbourne Victory in Australia.

== Career statistics ==
=== Club ===
As of match played 26 May 2025

Appearances and goals by club, season and competition
Club	Season	League			National cup (Note: Includes DFB-Pokal, Austrian Cup)		Europe		Other		Total	
Club	Season	Division	Apps	Goals	Apps	Goals	Apps	Goals	Apps	Goals	Apps	Goals
Jahn Regensburg	2010–11	3. Liga	0	0	0	0	–		0	0	0	0
Jahn Regensburg	2011–12	3. Liga	7	0	1	0	–		2 (Note: Appearances in the 3. Liga promotion play-offs)	0	10	0
Jahn Regensburg	2012–13	2. Bundesliga	11	1	1	0	–		0	0	12	1
Jahn Regensburg	Total		18	1	2	0	–		2	0	22	1
FC St. Pauli II (loan)	2013–14	Regionalliga Nord	8	1	–		–		–		8	1
FC St. Pauli II (loan)	2014–15	Regionalliga Nord	4	0	–		–		–		4	0
FC St. Pauli II (loan)	2016–17	Regionalliga Nord	1	0	–		–		–		0	0
FC St. Pauli II (loan)	2019–20	Regionalliga Nord	2	0	–		–		–		2	0
FC St. Pauli II (loan)	Total		15	1	0	0	–		0	0	15	1
FC St. Pauli	2013–14	2. Bundesliga	9	0	0	0	–		0	0	9	0
FC St. Pauli	2014–15	2. Bundesliga	17	0	2	0	–		0	0	19	0
FC St. Pauli	2015–16	2. Bundesliga	30	0	1	0	–		0	0	31	0
FC St. Pauli	2016–17	2. Bundesliga	15	1	1	0	–		0	0	16	1
FC St. Pauli	2017–18	2. Bundesliga	8	0	0	0	–		0	0	8	0
FC St. Pauli	2018–19	2. Bundesliga	16	0	1	0	–		0	0	17	0
FC St. Pauli	2019–20	2. Bundesliga	6	0	0	0	–		0	0	6	0
FC St. Pauli	2020–21	2. Bundesliga	26	0	1	0	–		0	0	27	0
FC St. Pauli	2021–22	2. Bundesliga	24	0	2	0	–		0	0	26	0
FC St. Pauli	Total		151	1	8	0	–		0	0	159	1
LASK	2022–23	Austrian Bundesliga	29	1	4	0	–		–		33	1
LASK	2023–24	Austrian Bundesliga	28	2	4	1	8 (Note: Appearances in the UEFA Europa League)	0	–		40	3
LASK	2024–25	Austrian Bundesliga	26	1	5	1	6 (Note: Two appearances in UEFA Europa League, four appearances in UEFA Conference League)	0	–		37	2
LASK	Total		83	4	13	2	14	0	0	0	110	6
Career total			267	7	23	2	14	0	2	0	306	9
