= Daniel-Kofi Kyereh =

Ghanaian footballer

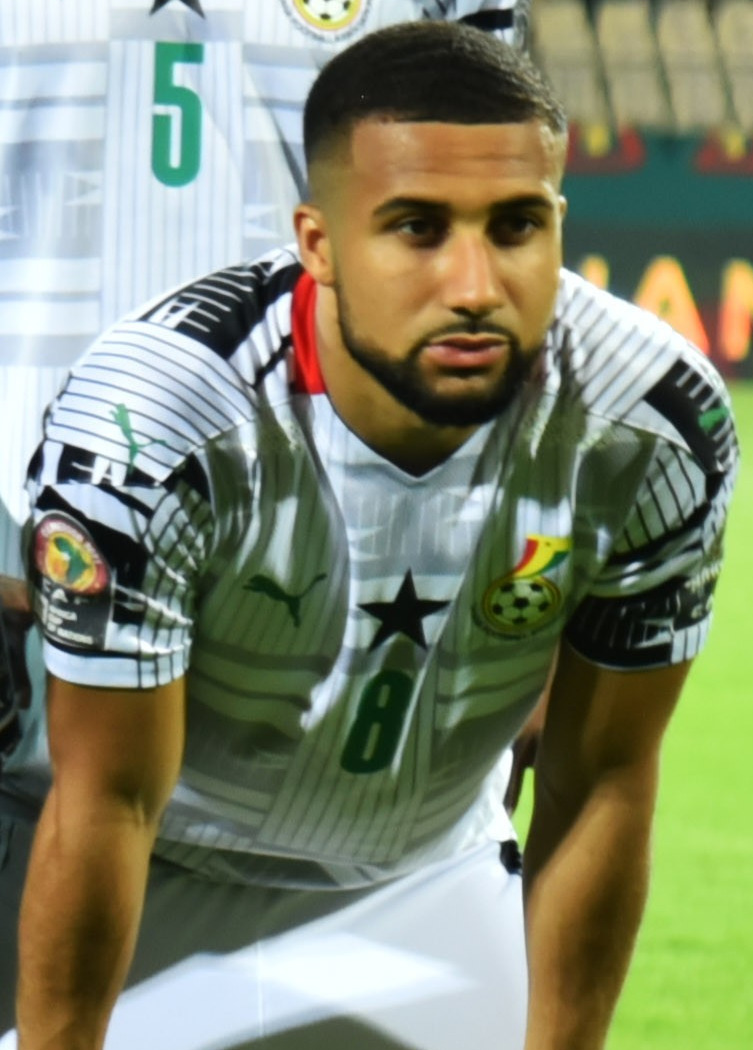

Personal information
- Full name: Daniel-Kofi Kyereh
- Date of birth: 8 March 1996 (age 30)
- Place of birth: Accra, Ghana
- Height: 1.79 m (5 ft 10 in)
- Position: Forward

Team information
- Current team: VfL Osnabrück
- Number: 7

Youth career
- Eintracht Braunschweig
- –2014: VfL Wolfsburg
- 2014–2015: TSV Havelse

Senior career*
Years	Team	Apps	(Gls)
2014–2018	TSV Havelse	61	(16)
2018–2020	Wehen Wiesbaden	62	(21)
2020–2022	FC St. Pauli	63	(21)
2022–2026	SC Freiburg	12	(2)
2022–2026	SC Freiburg II	8	(2)
2026–	VfL Osnabrück	0	(0)

International career^{‡}
2021–2022	Ghana	18	(0)
- * Club domestic league appearances and goals as of 16 May 2026 ‡ National team caps and goals as of 22:15, 10 December 2022 (UTC)

Daniel-Kofi Kyereh (born 8 March 1996) is a Ghanaian professional footballer who plays as a forward for German 2. Bundesliga club VfL Osnabrück.

== Club career ==
=== Wehen Wiesbaden ===
On 6 June 2018, Kyereh signed with 3. Liga club, Wehen Wiesbaden. He helped Wehen secure promotion to the 2. Bundesliga with a goal in a 3–1 victory over Ingolstadt in a relegation match in May 2019. Following the club's relegation in the 2019–20 season, Kyereh was released on 30 June 2020.

=== FC St. Pauli ===
In July 2020, Kyereh signed a three-year contract with FC St. Pauli. In his first game in 2020 he scored two late goals to secure a point.

=== SC Freiburg ===
On 27 June 2022, Kyereh signed with Bundesliga side SC Freiburg. He scored his first competitive goal for Freiburg in a league match against Mainz on 1 October 2022. Five days later, he scored his first goal in European football in a 2–0 win over FC Nantes in the group stage of the Europa League.

== International career ==
Kyereh was born in Ghana to a German mother and Ghanaian father, and moved to Germany at the age of 1. He debuted for the Ghana national team in a 1–0 2022 FIFA World Cup qualification win over Ethiopia on 3 September 2021.

On 14 November 2022, Ghana manager Otto Addo selected Kyereh as part of the final squad to represent the nation at the 2022 FIFA World Cup in Qatar. He featured as a second-half substitute in all three matches as the Black Stars were eliminated in the group stage.

== Career statistics ==
=== Club ===
As of match played 13 November 2022

Appearances and goals by club, season and competition
Club	Season	League			DFB-Pokal		Continental		Other		Total	
Club	Season	Division	Apps	Goals	Apps	Goals	Apps	Goals	Apps	Goals	Apps	Goals
TSV Havelse	2014–15	Regionalliga Nord	4	2	0	0	–		–		4	2
TSV Havelse	2015–16	Regionalliga Nord	1	0	0	0	–		–		1	0
TSV Havelse	2016–17	Regionalliga Nord	27	3	0	0	–		–		27	3
TSV Havelse	2017–18	Regionalliga Nord	29	11	0	0	–		–		29	11
TSV Havelse	Total		61	16	0	0	0	0	0	0	61	16
Wehen Wiesbaden	2018–19	3. Liga	34	15	2	0	–		2 (Note: Appearances in 2. Bundesliga relegation play-offs)	2	38	17
Wehen Wiesbaden	2019–20	2. Bundesliga	28	6	1	1	–		0	0	29	7
Wehen Wiesbaden	Total		62	21	3	1	0	0	2	2	67	24
FC St. Pauli	2020–21	2. Bundesliga	34	9	1	0	–		–		35	9
FC St. Pauli	2021–22	2. Bundesliga	29	12	3	1	–		–		32	13
FC St. Pauli	Total		63	21	4	1	0	0	0	0	67	22
SC Freiburg	2022–23	Bundesliga	9	2	2	0	4 (Note: Appearances in UEFA Europa League)	1	–		15	3
Career total			195	60	9	2	4	1	2	2	190	65

== Honours ==
Wehen Wiesbaden

- Hessian Cup: 2018–19
