= Leart Paqarada =

Kosovan footballer

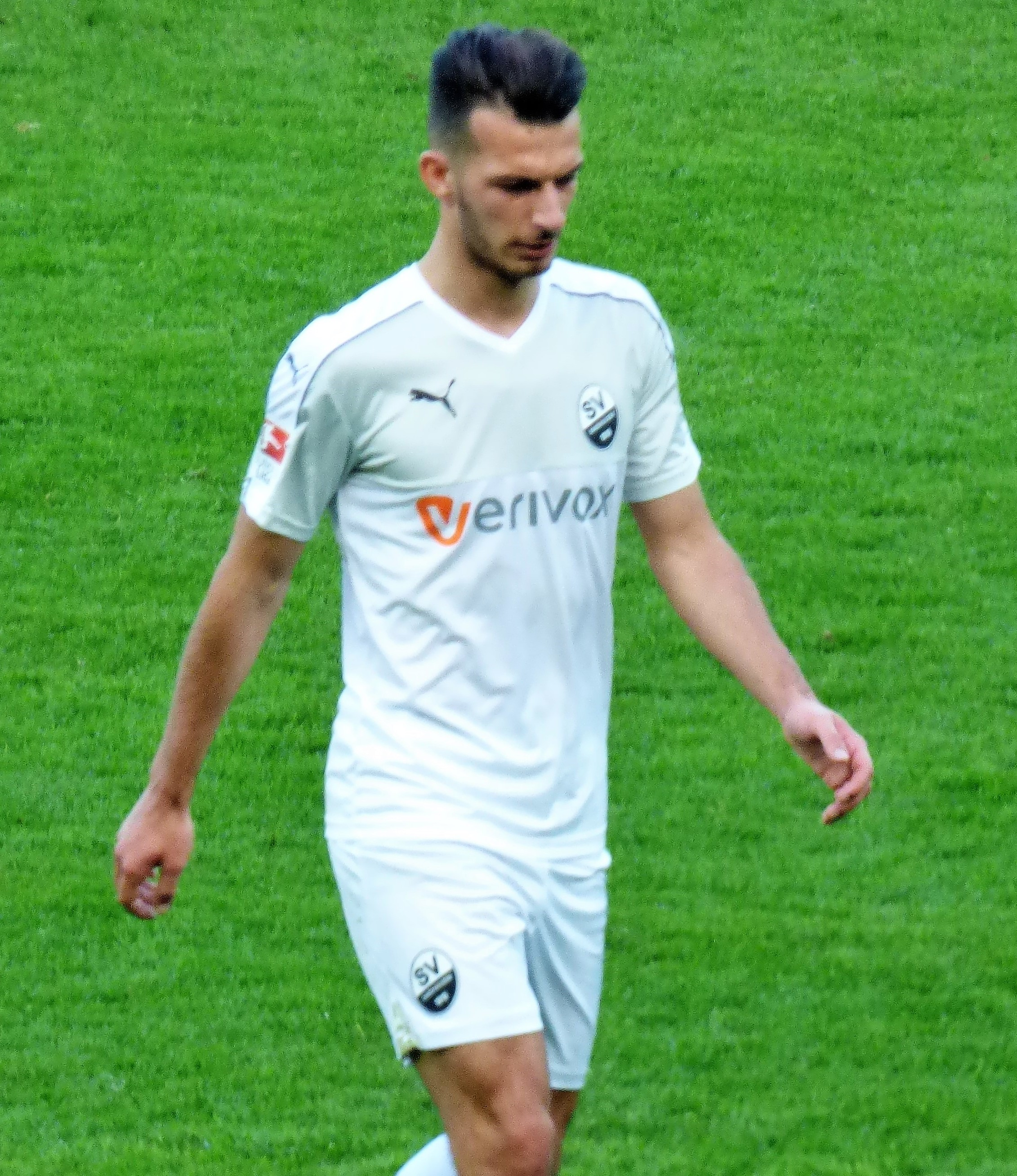
- Paqarada with SV Sandhausen in 2017

Personal information
- Full name: Leart Shukri Paqarada
- Date of birth: 8 October 1994 (age 32)
- Place of birth: Aachen, Germany
- Height: 1.84 m (6 ft 0 in)
- Position: Left-back

Team information
- Current team: 1. FC Heidenheim
- Number: 23

Youth career
- 1998–2003: Werder Bremen
- 2003–2012: Bayer Leverkusen

Senior career*
Years	Team	Apps	(Gls)
2012–2014	Bayer Leverkusen II	30	(1)
2014–2020	SV Sandhausen	152	(5)
2020–2023	FC St. Pauli	95	(5)
2023–2025	1. FC Köln	48	(0)
2025–	1. FC Heidenheim	1	(0)

International career^{‡}
2009–2010	Germany U16	7	(0)
2010–2011	Germany U17	6	(0)
2013	Albania U21	1	(0)
2014–	Kosovo	37	(1)
- * Club domestic league appearances and goals as of 13 September 2025 ‡ National team caps and goals as of 19:50, 5 September 2025

Leart Shukri Paqarada (born 8 October 1994) is a professional footballer who plays as a left-back for 2. Bundesliga club 1. FC Heidenheim. Born in Germany, he plays for the Kosovo national team.

== Club career ==
=== Early career ===
Born and raised in Germany, Paqarada joined local club Werder Bremen at the age of four. After five years, he moved to Bayer Leverkusen, where he played at all youth levels. In November 2012, Paqarada was promoted to the club's reserve team, Bayer Leverkusen II. His debut with reserve team came on 17 November in a 3–2 away win against VfB Hüls after coming on as a substitute in the 89th minute in place of Tobias Steffen.

=== SV Sandhausen ===
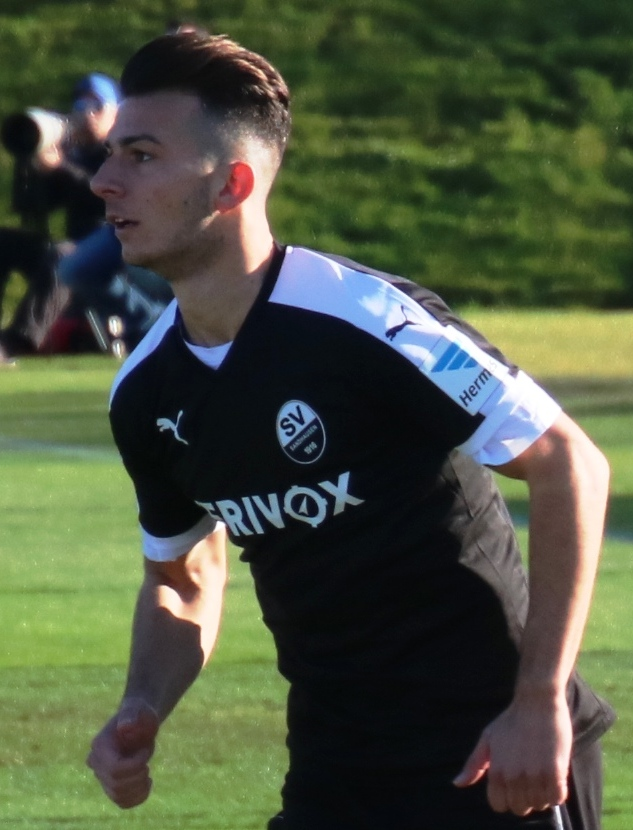
Paqarada with SV Sandhausen in 2016

In the summer of 2014, Paqarada joined 2. Bundesliga side SV Sandhausen. On 3 August 2014, he was named as a Sandhausen substitute for the first time in a league match against Darmstadt 98. His debut with Sandhausen came seven days later in a 1–1 home draw against 1. FC Kaiserslautern after being named in the starting line-up.

=== FC St. Pauli ===
On 2 August 2020, Paqarada signed a three-year contract with 2. Bundesliga rivals FC St. Pauli, joining on a free transfer. On 13 September 2020, he made his debut with St. Pauli in the 2020–21 DFB-Pokal first round against SV Elversberg after being named in the starting line-up and assists in his side's first goal during a 4–2 away defeat. He established himself as a regular in the club's line-up and served as its captain during the 2022–23 season.

=== 1. FC Köln ===
On 23 January 2023, Paqarada signed a three-year precontract with Bundesliga club 1. FC Köln and this transfer would become legally effective in July 2023.

=== 1. FC Heidenheim ===
On 28 August 2025, Paqarada moved to 1. FC Heidenheim on a two-season deal.

== International career ==
=== Youth with Germany and Albania ===
From 2009, until 2011, Paqarada represented Germany at youth international level, making 13 appearances for the U16 and U17 teams. In February 2013, he became part of Albania U21 side with which he made his debut in a 0–0 home draw against Macedonia U21 after being named in the starting line-up.

=== Kosovo ===
==== First period ====
On 4 September 2014, Paqarada received a call-up from Kosovo for the friendly match against Oman, and made his debut after being named in the starting line-up. His last international match was on 24 March 2021 against Lithuania in Pristina. On 4 April 2021, Paqarada through an Instagram post announced his temporary international retirement due to the degradation, disrespect and ignorance that according to him was done by Kosovo's head coach Bernard Challandes and the possible return to the national team would occur if a new head coach is appointed.

==== Second period ====
On 16 September 2022, Paqarada upon return from retirement received a call-up from Kosovo for the 2022–23 UEFA Nations League matches against Northern Ireland and Cyprus, but due to injury, could not be part of the national team. On 25 March 2023, he made his first match with Kosovo after return from retirement in the UEFA Euro 2024 qualifying matches against Israel after being named in the starting line-up.

== Personal life ==
Born in Aachen, Germany to Kosovo Albanian parents, Paqarada is the son of Shukri Paqarada, a former professional footballer who played as a goalkeeper for Prishtina.

== Career statistics ==
=== Club ===
As of match played 13 September 2025

Appearances and goals by club, season and competition
Club	Season	League			DFB-Pokal		Other		Total	
Club	Season	Division	Apps	Goals	Apps	Goals	Apps	Goals	Apps	Goals
Bayer Leverkusen II	2012–13	Regionalliga West	3	0	0	0	—		3	0
Bayer Leverkusen II	2013–14	Regionalliga West	27	1	0	0	—		27	1
Bayer Leverkusen II	Total		30	1	0	0	0	0	30	1
SV Sandhausen	2014–15	2. Bundesliga	14	0	1	0	—		15	0
SV Sandhausen	2015–16	2. Bundesliga	29	0	2	0	—		31	0
SV Sandhausen	2016–17	2. Bundesliga	18	0	1	0	—		19	0
SV Sandhausen	2017–18	2. Bundesliga	30	3	1	0	—		31	3
SV Sandhausen	2018–19	2. Bundesliga	28	1	2	0	—		30	1
SV Sandhausen	2019–20	2. Bundesliga	32	1	1	0	—		33	1
SV Sandhausen	Total		151	5	8	0	0	0	159	5
FC St. Pauli	2020–21	2. Bundesliga	30	1	1	0	—		31	1
FC St. Pauli	2021–22	2. Bundesliga	33	2	4	1	—		37	3
FC St. Pauli	2022–23	2. Bundesliga	32	3	2	0	—		34	3
FC St. Pauli	Total		95	6	7	1	0	0	102	7
1. FC Köln	2023–24	Bundesliga	17	0	2	0	—		19	0
1. FC Köln	2024–25	2. Bundesliga	31	0	4	0	—		35	0
1. FC Köln	Total		48	0	6	0	—		54	0
1. FC Heidenheim	2025–26	Bundesliga	1	0	0	0	—		1	0
Career total			325	12	21	1	0	0	346	13

=== International ===
As of match played 5 September 2025

Appearances and goals by national team and year
National team	Year	Apps	Goals
Kosovo	2014	1	0
Kosovo	2015	2	0
Kosovo	2016	4	0
Kosovo	2017	4	0
Kosovo	2018	3	1
Kosovo	2019	5	0
Kosovo	2020	4	0
Kosovo	2021	1	0
Kosovo	2023	6	0
Kosovo	2024	3	0
Kosovo	2025	4	0
Total		37	1

Scores and results list Kosovo's goal tally first, score column indicates score after each Paqarada goal.

List of international goals scored by Leart Paqarada
No.	Date	Venue	Opponent	Score	Result	Competition	Ref.
1	27 March 2018	Stade Municipal Jean Rolland, Franconville, France	Burkina Faso	2–0	2–0	Friendly	

== Honours ==
1.FC Koln

- 2.Bundesliga: 2024–25
