= Jakov Medić =

Croatian footballer (born 1998)

Personal information
- Full name: Jakov Medić
- Date of birth: 7 September 1998 (age 28)
- Place of birth: Zagreb, Croatia
- Height: 6 ft 3 in (1.91 m)
- Position: Centre-back

Team information
- Current team: FC Utrecht (on loan from Norwich City)

Youth career
- 2007–2009: Kustošija
- 2009–2012: HAŠK
- 2012–2015: Hrvatski Dragovoljac
- 2015–2016: Zagreb
- 2016–2017: Istra 1961

Senior career*
Years	Team	Apps	(Gls)
2017	Istra 1961	2	(0)
2017	Lučko	1	(0)
2017–2018	Vinogradar	16	(2)
2018–2019	1. FC Nürnberg II	26	(2)
2018–2021	1. FC Nürnberg	0	(0)
2019–2021	→ SV Wehen Wiesbaden (loan)	30	(2)
2021	SV Wehen Wiesbaden	19	(3)
2021–2023	FC St. Pauli	59	(5)
2023–2025	Ajax	6	(1)
2024–2025	→ VfL Bochum (loan)	23	(1)
2025–	Norwich City	16	(0)
2026–	→ FC Utrecht (loan)	3	(0)

International career^{‡}
2022	Croatia U23	1	(0)
- * Club domestic league appearances and goals as of 14:15, 20 September 2026 (UTC) ‡ National team caps and goals as of 19 January 2023

Jakov Medić (born 7 September 1998) is a Croatian professional footballer who plays as a centre-back for Eredivisie club FC Utrecht, on loan from EFL Championship club Norwich City.

== Career ==
Born in Zagreb, Medić started his career in local clubs Kustošija and HAŠK, before moving on to play in top-tier U17 and U19 Croatian competitions for Hrvatski Dragovoljac and NK Zagreb, before going on trial and signing for Istra 1961 during his last year of eligibility as a youth player. In the Pula-based club, Medić made his senior debut in the Prva HNL coming on for David Puclin in for David Puclin in the 58th minute of their 2–0 away loss to Slaven Belupo. Medić was capped only once more for the team, before leaving the club in the summer of 2017.

Initially signing for Lučko in the Druga HNL and playing a single match for them, Medić moved on in August 2017 to the high-flying third-tier club NK Vinogradar. During the winter pause Medić went on a trial with Dinamo Minsk, which did not pan out, and the player missed the second half of the season.

In the summer of 2018, however, Medić made a move abroad, signing for 1. FC Nürnberg, playing for their fourth-tier reserves. In 2019, he moved on a two-year loan to the 2. Bundesliga team SV Wehen Wiesbaden. Relegated with the team, Medić remained with Wehen Wiesbaden despite the club's relegation to 3. Liga, and, becoming a key player for the team, the club made his move permanent, signing him on a contract until 2024.

In June 2021, FC St. Pauli announced Medić would join the club for the 2021–22 season.

On 6 August 2023, Medić signed for Dutch club Ajax on a five-year deal. On 12 August 2023, he scored a goal on his debut against Heracles Almelo.

On 20 August 2024, Medić returned to Germany and joined VfL Bochum on loan with an option to buy. On 25 June 2025, Medić joined Championship club Norwich City for an undisclosed fee, signing a three-year contract with the option for an additional year.

== International career ==
In September 2022, Medić made his debut for Croatia U23 in a 3–0 win over Qatar A.

== Personal life ==
His family hails from Čitluk, Bosnia and Herzegovina.

== Career statistics ==
=== Club ===
As of match played 20 September 2026

Appearances and goals by club, season and competition
Club	Season	League			National cup (Note: Includes Croatian Football Cup, DFB-Pokal, KNVB Cup, FA Cup)		Continental		Total	
Club	Season	Division	Apps	Goals	Apps	Goals	Apps	Goals	Apps	Goals
NK Istra 1961	2016–17	Croatian First League	2	0	—		—		2	0
NK Lučko	2017	2. NL	1	0	—		—		1	0
NK Vinogradar	2017–18	3. NL	0	0	1	0	—		1	0
1. FC Nürnberg II	2018–19	Regionalliga	26	2	—		—		26	2
SV Wehen Wiesbaden	2019–20	2. Bundesliga	13	0	0	0	—		13	0
SV Wehen Wiesbaden	2020–21	3. Liga	36	5	2	0	—		38	5
SV Wehen Wiesbaden	Total		49	5	2	0	—		51	5
FC St. Pauli	2021–22	2. Bundesliga	30	1	4	1	—		34	2
FC St. Pauli	2022–23	2. Bundesliga	29	4	1	2	—		30	6
FC St. Pauli	2023–24	2. Bundesliga	1	0	0	0	—		1	0
FC St. Pauli	Total		60	5	5	3	—		65	8
Ajax	2023–24	Eredivisie	6	1	0	0	3 (Note: Three appearances in UEFA Europa League)	0	9	1
VfL Bochum (loan)	2024–25	Bundesliga	23	1	0	0	—		23	1
Norwich City	2025–26	Championship	16	0	1	0	1	0	18	0
Utrecht (loan)	2026–27	Eredivisie	3	0	0	0	—		3	0
Career total			186	14	9	3	4	0	199	17
