= Maximilian Dittgen =

German footballer

Personal information
- Date of birth: 3 March 1995 (age 31)
- Place of birth: Moers, Germany
- Height: 1.82 m (6 ft 0 in)
- Position: Midfielder

Team information
- Current team: VfL Bochum II
- Number: 29

Youth career
- –2004: SC Rheinkamp
- 2004–2007: MSV Duisburg
- 2007–2009: Schalke 04
- 2009–2010: Borussia Dortmund
- 2010–2013: Schalke 04
- 2013: 1. FC Nürnberg

Senior career*
Years	Team	Apps	(Gls)
2013–2015	1. FC Nürnberg II	49	(4)
2014–2015	1. FC Nürnberg	6	(0)
2015–2016	Sonnenhof Großaspach	37	(6)
2016–2018	1. FC Kaiserslautern II	19	(4)
2016–2018	1. FC Kaiserslautern	5	(0)
2017–2018	→ Wehen Wiesbaden (loan)	20	(0)
2018–2020	Wehen Wiesbaden	56	(3)
2020–2022	FC St. Pauli	55	(7)
2022–2025	FC Ingolstadt	34	(3)
2025–2026	MSV Duisburg	25	(3)
2026–	VfL Bochum II	7	(1)

International career
2010	Germany U15	2	(0)
2010–2011	Germany U16	5	(3)
2011–2012	Germany U17	17	(1)
2012–2013	Germany U18	3	(0)
2013–2014	Germany U19	5	(0)
2014–2016	Germany U20	11	(2)
- * Club domestic league appearances and goals as of 23 September 2026

Maximilian Dittgen (born 3 March 1995) is a German professional footballer who plays as a midfielder for VfL Bochum II.

He was a youth international for Germany on multiple levels, most recently for the under-20 team in 2016.

== Career ==
In July 2018, after a one-year loan to Wehen Wiesbaden, he joined the team permanently.

In August 2020, after Wehen Wiesbaden's relegation from the 2. Bundesliga, he moved to FC St. Pauli.

On 6 June 2022, Dittgen signed with FC Ingolstadt.

On 23 January 2025, Dittgen returned to his childhood club MSV Duisburg in Regionalliga West. He left Duisburg in the summer of 2026, and moved to VfL Bochum II.

== Career statistics ==
As of match played 23 September 2026

Appearances and goals by club, season and competition
Club	Season	League			Cup		Other		Total	
Club	Season	Division	Apps	Goals	Apps	Goals	Apps	Goals	Apps	Goals
1. FC Nürnberg II	2012–13	Regionalliga Bayern	1	0	—		—		1	0
1. FC Nürnberg II	2013–14	Regionalliga Bayern	24	2	—		—		24	2
1. FC Nürnberg II	2014–15	Regionalliga Bayern	24	2	—		—		24	2
1. FC Nürnberg II	Total		49	4	—		—		49	4
1. FC Nürnberg	2014–15	2. Bundesliga	6	0	—		—		6	0
Sonnenhof Großaspach	2015–16	3. Liga	37	6	—		—		37	6
1. FC Kaiserslautern	2016–17	2. Bundesliga	5	0	—		—		5	0
1. FC Kaiserslautern II	2016–17	Regionalliga Südwest	19	4	—		—		19	4
Wehen Wiesbaden	2017–18	3. Liga	20	0	1	0	—		21	0
Wehen Wiesbaden	2018–19	3. Liga	24	0	1	0	2 (Note: Appearances in 2. Bundesliga relegation playoffs)	1	27	1
Wehen Wiesbaden	2019–20	2. Bundesliga	32	3	1	0	—		33	3
Wehen Wiesbaden	Total		56	3	2	0	2	1	60	4
FC St. Pauli	2020–21	2. Bundesliga	32	3	1	0	—		33	3
FC St. Pauli	2021–22	2. Bundesliga	23	4	4	1	—		27	5
FC St. Pauli	Total		55	7	5	1	—		60	8
FC Ingolstadt	2022–23	3. Liga	5	1	—		—		5	1
FC Ingolstadt	2023–24	3. Liga	18	2	—		—		18	2
FC Ingolstadt	2024–25	3. Liga	11	0	—		—		11	0
FC Ingolstadt	Total		34	3	—		—		34	3
MSV Duisburg	2024–25	Regionalliga West	12	2	—		—		12	2
MSV Duisburg	2025–26	3. Liga	13	1	—		—		13	1
MSV Duisburg	Total		25	3	—		—		25	3
VfL Bochum II	2026–27	Regionalliga West	7	1	—		—		7	1
Career total			313	31	8	1	2	1	323	33

== Honours ==
Germany U17

- UEFA European Under-17 Championship: runner-up 2012
