= James Lawrence (footballer) =

Wales international footballer

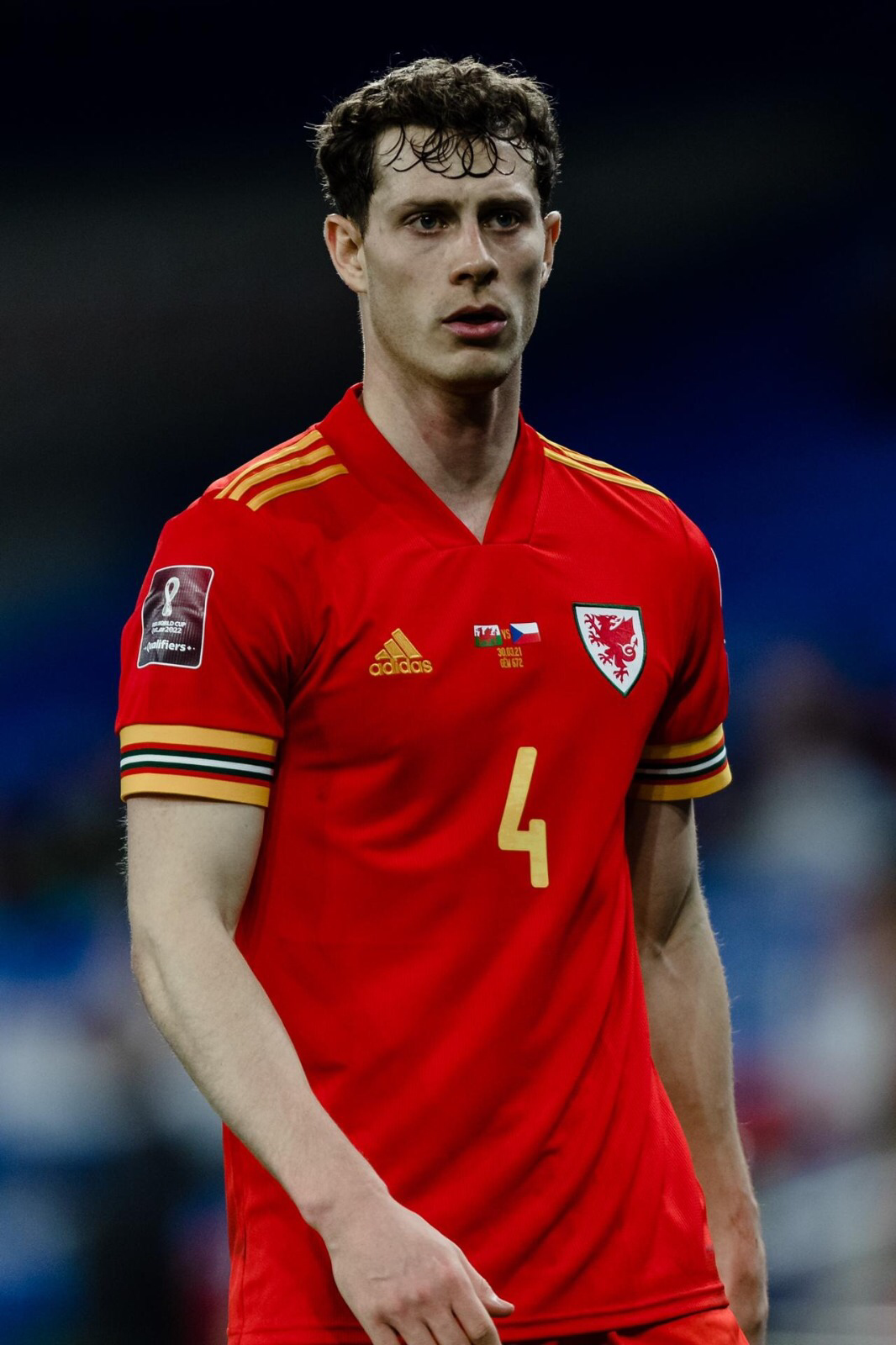
- Lawrence playing for Wales in 2021

Personal information
- Full name: James Alexander Lawrence
- Date of birth: 22 August 1992 (age 34)
- Place of birth: Henley-on-Thames, England
- Height: 6 ft 2 in (1.88 m)
- Positions: Centre back; defensive midfielder

Team information
- Current team: Almere City
- Number: 4

Youth career
- 2001–2003: Arsenal
- 2005–2006: Queens Park Rangers
- 2008–2009: HFC Haarlem
- 2009–2011: Ajax
- 2011–2012: Sparta Rotterdam
- 2012–2014: RKC Waalwijk

Senior career*
Years	Team	Apps	(Gls)
2014–2018	AS Trenčín	86	(5)
2018–2020	Anderlecht	23	(0)
2019–2020	→ St. Pauli (loan)	14	(1)
2020–2022	St. Pauli	37	(0)
2022–2024	Nürnberg	24	(0)
2024–	Almere City	69	(0)

International career^{‡}
2018–	Wales	11	(0)
- * Club domestic league appearances and goals as of 13:50, 1 November 2026 (UTC). ‡ National team caps and goals as of 22:15, 5 September 2021 (UTC)

James Alexander Lawrence (born 22 August 1992) is a Welsh professional footballer who plays for Eerste Divisie club Almere City.

Lawrence has previously played for Nürnberg, St. Pauli, Anderlecht, AS Trenčín and youth teams at Arsenal, Queens Park Rangers, Sparta Rotterdam and Ajax.

== Club career ==
=== Early career ===
Lawrence's early youth career included London clubs Enfield, Arsenal and Queens Park Rangers. In 2008 his family moved to the Netherlands where he joined HFC Haarlem. In 2009 Lawrence left Haarlem to join Ajax with whom he won the Netherlands U19 First Division Championship in 2010–11 and was coached by Arsenal legend Dennis Bergkamp. Lawrence then had spells with Jong Sparta Rotterdam and Jong RKC Waalwijk whilst he was enrolled at the Johan Cruyff Institute in Amsterdam.

=== AS Trenčín ===
Lawrence transferred to AS Trenčín on 13 August 2014 aged 21 and scored on his debut the same day in a Slovak Cup match against ŠK Strážske. Four days later, Lawrence made his Fortuna Liga debut in a 4–2 win against Košice. On 1 May 2015, Lawrence helped AS Trenčín to a maiden Slovak Cup, beating Senica in the final in Poprad. In May 2015 AS Trenčín became Fortuna Liga Champions for the first time with Lawrence thus achieving the league and cup double in his first senior season.

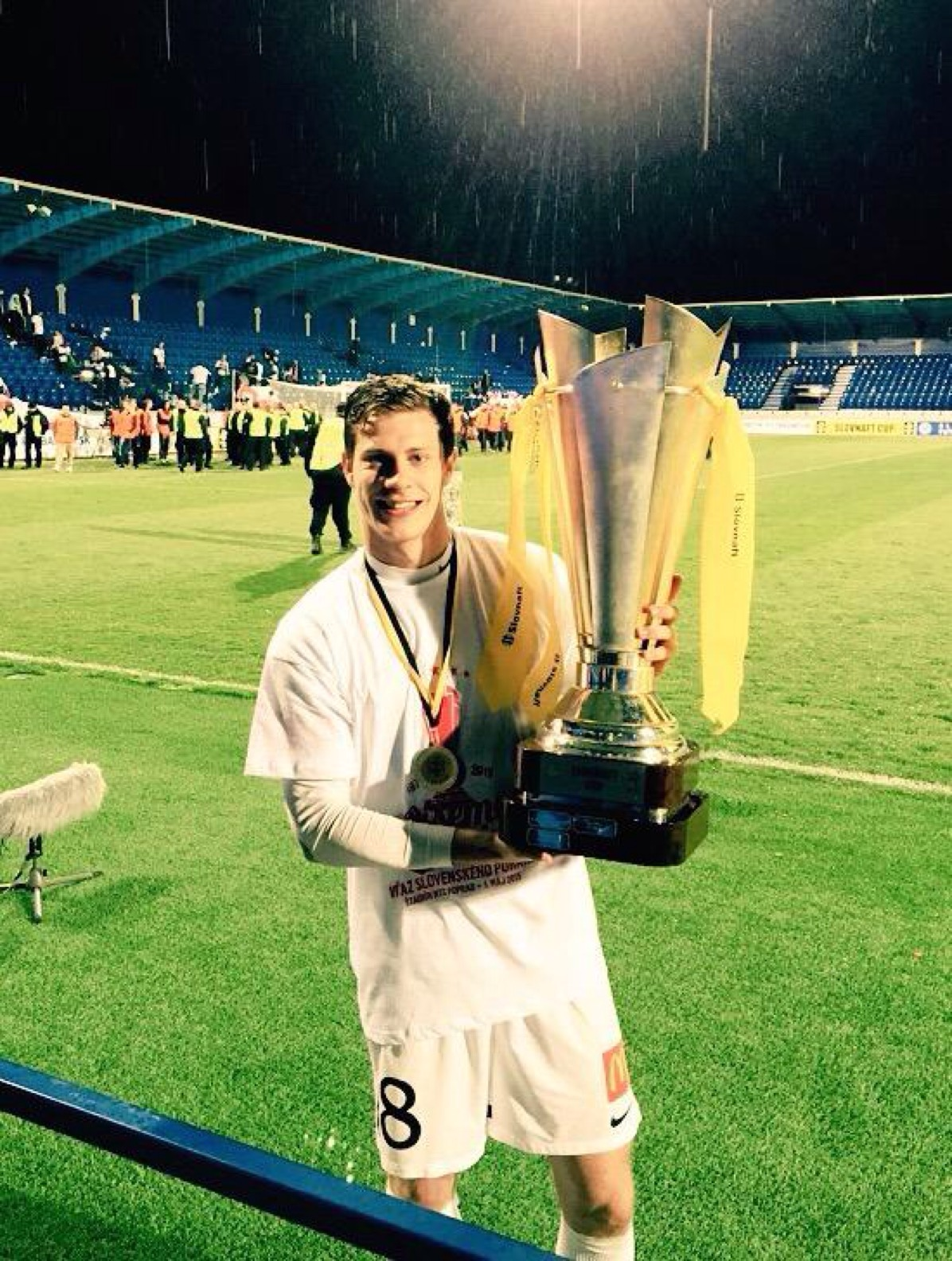
Lawrence with the Slovak Cup, Poprad 2015

The AS Trenčín champions of 2014–15, with an average age of 21.74, were recognised as having been the youngest champions across 31 top division European leagues from 2009 to 2017 by the CIES Football Observatory.

Lawrence missed the end of the 2014–15 season and the beginning of the 2015–16 season due to an injury sustained in the 2015 Cup Final, returning on 13 October 2015 when he scored in a 3–0 win over Blava Jaslovské Bohunice in the 4th round of the Slovak Cup. A 3–1 win over Slovan Bratislava in the Slovak Cup Final on 29 April 2016 secured a second Slovak Cup for Lawrence and AS Trenčín. On 8 May 2016, AS Trenčín beat Slovan Bratislava 4–0 to become Fortuna Liga Champions for the second year in succession. Two seasons later, on 16 August 2018, Lawrence's role in the elimination of Feyenoord from the UEFA Europa League qualifying round brought him to the attention of Anderlecht who went on to negotiate his transfer from Trenčín in just 13 days later.

=== Anderlecht ===
On 29 August 2018, Lawrence joined Anderlecht, Belgium's most successful league club. Lawrence played 23 league matches for Anderlecht during the 2018–19 season with Anderlecht finishing in fourth place in the Jupiler Pro League and in sixth place in the play-offs.

=== FC St. Pauli ===
On 22 August 2019, Lawrence joined 2. Bundesliga side St. Pauli on loan from Anderlecht until the end of the 2019–20 season. He made his debut for St. Pauli on 26 August 2019, scoring in a 2–1 win over Holstein Kiel.

On 1 October 2020, Lawrence made a permanent transfer from Anderlecht to St. Pauli. On 6 March 2021 Lawrence captained St. Pauli for the first time in a 0-0 draw away at Karlsruher SC and on 21 July 2021 he was named vice-captain of St. Pauli for the 2021–22 season. On 18 January 2022, Lawrence captained St. Pauli in a 2–1 win at home against cup holders Borussia Dortmund in the DFB-Pokal which put St. Pauli into the cup quarter-finals for the first time in 16 years. St. Pauli ended the 2021-22 season in fifth place in 2. Bundesliga.

=== 1. FC Nürnberg ===
On 22 July 2022, Lawrence joined 2. Bundesliga side 1. FC Nürnberg.

=== Almere City ===
On 25 August 2024, Lawrence signed a two-season contract with Almere City in the Netherlands. On 27 June 2025, Lawrence signed a new two-season contract with Almere City. On 17 August 2025 Lawrence captained Almere City for the first time in the season's opening match against FC Emmen.

== International career ==
On 5 November 2018, Lawrence was called up for the Wales squad by Ryan Giggs and he started his first game for the national side in a friendly against Albania on 20 November 2018. His first competitive game for Wales was in a 1–0 win against Slovakia at Cardiff City Stadium on 24 March 2019. On 18 November 2020, Lawrence was in the starting line-up as Wales became UEFA Nations League, Group H, winners, beating Finland 3–1, ensuring a place in the Nations League top tier for 2022 and a fall-back play-off spot for 2022 FIFA World Cup qualification. Lawrence was named in the Wales squad for the UEFA Euro 2020 competition on 30 May 2021 but had to withdraw on the day of the announcement following injury in the previous day's training session. Lawrence's competitive matches for Wales included four wins; against Slovakia, Finland, Czech Republic and Belarus, and losses away to Croatia, Hungary and Belgium in the period in which Wales gained promotion in the Nations League and qualification for the 2022 World Cup.

== Personal life ==
From April 2024 to August 2025, he was in a relationship with Dutch television presenter Monica Geuze. As of September 2026, he is in a relationship with Dutch influencer Lies Zhara.

== Career statistics ==
=== Club ===
As of match played 30 October 2026

Appearances and goals by club, season and competition
Club	Season	League			National Cup		Continental		Total	
Club	Season	Division	Apps	Goals	Apps	Goals	Apps	Goals	Apps	Goals
AS Trenčín	2014–15	Slovak Super Liga	18	0	7	1	0	0	25	1
AS Trenčín	2015–16	Slovak Super Liga	15	1	5	1	0	0	20	2
AS Trenčín	2016–17	Slovak Super Liga	25	3	4	1	5	2	34	6
AS Trenčín	2017–18	Slovak Super Liga	25	1	2	0	2	0	29	1
AS Trenčín	2018–19	Slovak Super Liga	3	0	0	0	6	1	9	1
AS Trenčín	Total		86	5	18	3	13	3	117	11
Anderlecht	2018–19	Belgian First Division A	23	0	0	0	3	0	26	0
FC St. Pauli (loan)	2019–20	2. Bundesliga	14	1	0	0	–		14	1
FC St. Pauli	2020–21	2. Bundesliga	19	0	0	0	–		19	0
FC St. Pauli	2021–22	2. Bundesliga	18	0	3	0	–		21	0
FC St. Pauli	Total		51	1	3	0	0	0	54	1
1. FC Nürnberg	2022–23	2. Bundesliga	21	0	3	0	–		24	0
1. FC Nürnberg	2023–24	2. Bundesliga	3	0	1	0	–		4	0
1. FC Nürnberg	Total		24	0	4	0	–		28	0
Almere City FC	2024–25	Eredivisie	26	0	0	0	0	0	26	0
Almere City FC	2025–26	Eerste Divisie	33	0	2	0	0	0	35	0
Almere City FC	2026–27	Eerste Divisie	10	1	1	0	0	0	11	1
Almere City FC	Total		69	1	3	0	–		72	1
Career total			253	7	28	3	16	3	297	13

=== International ===
As of 11 October 2021

Appearances and goals by national team and year
National team	Year	Apps	Goals
Wales	2018	1	0
Wales	2019	4	0
Wales	2020	2	0
Wales	2021	4	0
Total		11	0

== Honours ==
AS Trenčín

- Slovak Super Liga: 2014–15, 2015–16
- Slovak Cup: 2014–15, 2015–16
