= Luca Zander =

German footballer (born 1995)

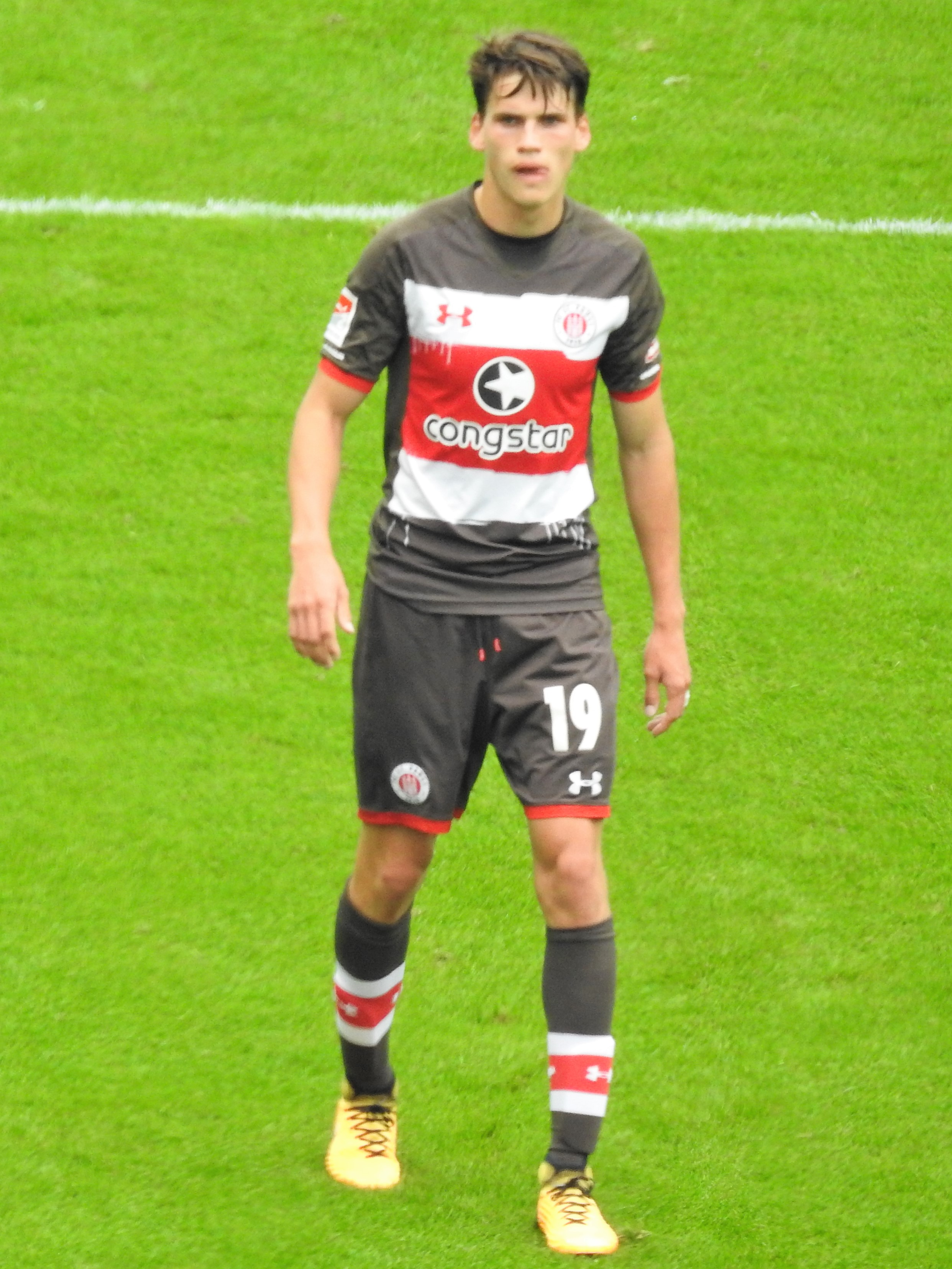
- Zander with FC St. Pauli in 2017

Personal information
- Full name: Luca-Milan Zander
- Date of birth: 9 August 1995 (age 31)
- Place of birth: Weyhe, Germany
- Height: 1.83 m (6 ft 0 in)
- Position: Full-back

Team information
- Current team: Blau-Weiß Lohne
- Number: 4

Youth career
- 2000–2006: SC Weyhe
- 2006–2014: Werder Bremen

Senior career*
Years	Team	Apps	(Gls)
2013–2019	Werder Bremen II	61	(0)
2014–2019	Werder Bremen	2	(0)
2017–2019	→ FC St. Pauli (loan)	30	(0)
2019–2023	FC St. Pauli	84	(4)
2023–2025	SV Sandhausen	39	(3)
2025–	Blau-Weiß Lohne	19	(1)

International career^{‡}
2009	Germany U15	1	(0)
2011	Germany U17	1	(0)
2015	Germany U20	2	(0)
- * Club domestic league appearances and goals as of 20 June 2026 ‡ National team caps and goals as of 30 January 2017

Luca-Milan Zander (born 9 August 1995) is a German professional footballer who plays as a full-back for Regionalliga Nord club Blau-Weiß Lohne. He has represented Germany at U15, U17, and U20 youth levels.

== Club career ==
=== Werder Bremen ===
Zander joined Werder Bremen in 2006 from SC Weyhe. He made his debut for Werder Bremen II on 2 November 2014 against Hamburger SV II.

On 26 September 2015, he made his first team debut in a Bundesliga game against Bayer Leverkusen replacing Felix Kroos after 56 minutes in a 3–0 home loss.

==== FC St. Pauli (loan) ====
In June 2017, Zander agreed to join FC St. Pauli on loan for two seasons.

=== FC St. Pauli ===
In May 2019, it was announced Zander would be joining FC St. Pauli permanently for the 2019–20 season. The transfer fee paid to Werder Bremen was reported as €400,000.

== International career ==
Zander is a youth international for Germany having represented the country at U15, U17, and U20 levels.
