= Lukas Daschner =

German footballer

Personal information
- Full name: Lukas Stephan Horst Daschner
- Date of birth: 1 October 1998 (age 28)
- Place of birth: Duisburg, Germany
- Height: 1.82 m (6 ft 0 in)
- Positions: Attacking midfielder; forward

Team information
- Current team: St. Gallen
- Number: 10

Youth career
- –2013: Schalke 04
- 2013–2017: MSV Duisburg

Senior career*
Years	Team	Apps	(Gls)
2017–2020	MSV Duisburg	50	(13)
2020–2023	FC St. Pauli	70	(10)
2022–2023	FC St. Pauli II	2	(0)
2023–2025	VfL Bochum	34	(2)
2025	→ St. Gallen (loan)	16	(3)
2025–	St. Gallen	35	(3)
- * Club domestic league appearances and goals as of 28 September 2026

Lukas Stephan Horst Daschner (born 1 October 1998) is a German professional footballer who plays as an attacking midfielder or forward for Swiss Super League club St. Gallen.

== Career ==
Daschner signed his first professional contract with MSV Duisburg in April 2017. He made his 3. Liga debut for the club on 20 May against FSV Zwickau. On 17 August 2019, he extended his contract until 2021. In the 2019–20 season he scored 11 goals and made 5 assists in 34 3. Liga matches.

In August 2020, Daschner joined 2. Bundesliga side FC St. Pauli having agreed a contract until 2023. The transfer fee paid to MSV Duisburg was undisclosed.

On 3 February 2025, Daschner joined St. Gallen in Switzerland on loan, with an option to buy. On 30 June 2025, Daschner moved to St. Gallen on a permanent basis and signed a three-year contract.

== Career statistics ==
As of match played 28 September 2026

Appearances and goals by club, season and competition
Club	Season	League			Cup		Other		Total	
Club	Season	Division	Apps	Goals	Apps	Goals	Apps	Goals	Apps	Goals
MSV Duisburg	2016–17	3. Liga	1	0	0	0	—		1	0
MSV Duisburg	2017–18	2. Bundesliga	8	0	0	0	—		8	0
MSV Duisburg	2018–19	2. Bundesliga	7	2	0	0	—		7	2
MSV Duisburg	2019–20	3. Liga	34	11	2	1	—		36	12
MSV Duisburg	Total		50	13	2	1	—		52	14
FC St. Pauli	2020–21	2. Bundesliga	24	0	1	0	—		25	0
FC St. Pauli	2021–22	2. Bundesliga	12	1	0	0	—		12	1
FC St. Pauli	2022–23	2. Bundesliga	34	9	2	0	—		36	9
FC St. Pauli	Total		70	10	3	0	—		73	10
FC St. Pauli II	2021–22	Regionalliga Nord	2	0	—		—		2	0
VfL Bochum	2023–24	Bundesliga	20	1	1	0	2 (Note: Appearances in relegation play-off)	0	23	1
VfL Bochum	2024–25	Bundesliga	14	1	1	0	—		15	1
VfL Bochum	Total		34	2	2	0	2	0	38	2
FC St. Gallen (loan)	2024–25	Swiss Super League	16	3	0	0	—		16	3
FC St. Gallen	2025–26	Swiss Super League	26	1	4	0	—		30	1
FC St. Gallen	2026–27	Swiss Super League	9	2	0	0	6 (Note: Two appearances in Europa League and four in Conference League)	0	15	2
FC St. Gallen	Total		35	3	4	0	6	0	45	3
Career total			207	30	11	1	8	0	226	32

== Honours ==
MSV Duisburg

- 3. Liga: 2016–17
