= Jannes Wieckhoff =

German footballer (born 2000)

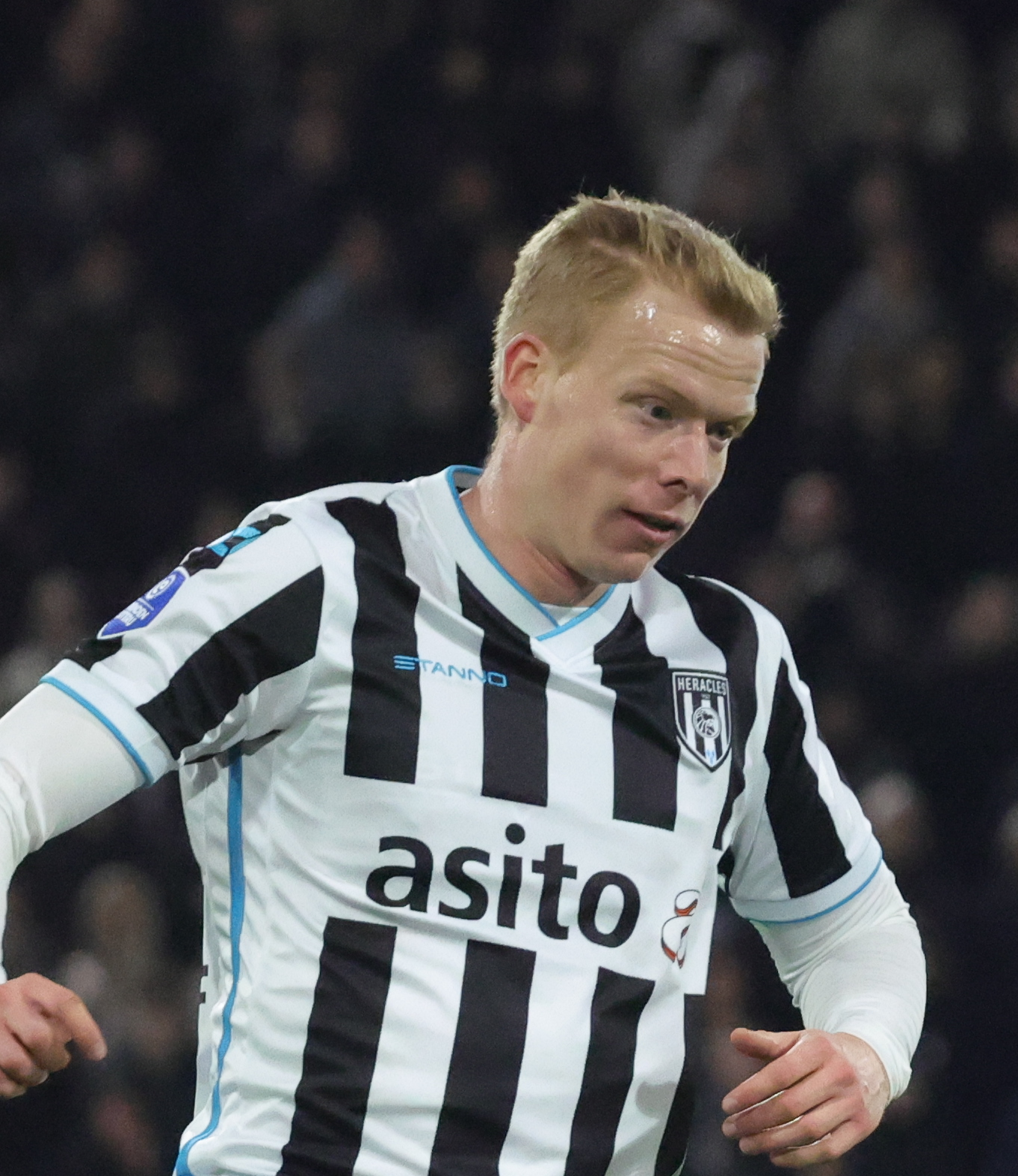
- Wieckhoff in 2026

Personal information
- Full name: Jannes Luca Wieckhoff
- Date of birth: 2 August 2000 (age 26)
- Place of birth: Schenefeld, Germany
- Height: 1.88 m (6 ft 2 in)
- Position: Right-back

Team information
- Current team: De Graafschap
- Number: 2

Youth career
- –2012: Hamburger SV
- 2012–2019: St. Pauli

Senior career*
| Years | Team | Apps | (Gls) |
| 2019–2023 | St. Pauli II | 30 | (2) |
| 2020–2023 | St. Pauli | 10 | (1) |
| 2023–2026 | Heracles Almelo | 58 | (0) |
| 2026– | De Graafschap | 7 | (0) |
- * Club domestic league appearances and goals as of 3 October 2026

Jannes Luca Wieckhoff (born 2 August 2000) is a German professional footballer who plays as a right-back for Eerste Divisie club De Graafschap in the Netherlands.

== Career ==
Wieckhoff made his debut for St. Pauli in the first round of the 2020–21 DFB-Pokal on 13 September 2020, coming on as a substitute in the 36th minute for Marvin Senger against fourth-division side SV Elversberg, which finished as a 4–2 away loss. He made his 2. Bundesliga debut the following week on 21 September, starting in the away match against VfL Bochum.

On 4 June 2023, Wieckhoff signed a deal until 2026 with an option of a further year with Dutch club Heracles Almelo, a promoted team to Eredivisie.

On 6 August 2026, Wieckhoff moved to De Graafschap for two seasons.
