= Hamburg derby =

Football rivalry in Hamburg, Germany

- Hamburger SV FC St. Pauli
- Other names: Hamburger Stadtderby
- Location: Hamburg, Germany
- Teams: Hamburger SV; FC St. Pauli
- First meeting: 7 December 1919
- Latest meeting: 23 January 2026; Bundesliga; St. Pauli 0–0 HSV

Statistics
- Total meetings: 113
- Most wins: HSV (70)
- All-time series: HSV: 70; Drawn: 18; St. Pauli: 25
- Largest victory: St. Pauli 0–9 HSV (13 November 1924)

The Hamburg derby (German: Hamburger Stadtderby) is a football rivalry between two major Hamburg sides, Hamburger SV and FC St. Pauli.

In total, the two sides met 113 times since 1919, of which Hamburger SV won 70 games and FC St. Pauli won 25 games. Earlier games between Hamburger SV, its predecessors SC Germania, Hamburger FC and FC Falke 1906, and St. Pauli TV are not counted here. Hamburger SV was formed from a merger in 1919, and FC St. Pauli was formed as a separate football side through a divorce with St. Pauli TV in 1924.

== History ==
Hamburger SV was founded when SC Germania of 1887, Hamburger FC of 1888 and FC Falke 1906 merged in 1919 (the date of SC Germania's founding is the official club foundation year given as 1887). FC St. Pauli emerged in 1924 as a spin-off from the Hamburg St. Pauli Turnverein gymnastics club. After its foundation, Hamburger SV rose to become the largest club in the city, and after the Second World War, FC St. Pauli replaced Eimsbütteler TV as a competitor of "HSV".

The first match between HSV and St. Pauli TV was played on 7 December 1919 in the "Hamburg Championship", Hamburger SV won this match 9–0. The first win for FC St. Pauli, whose nickname is "Kiezkicker", came on 19 October 1930, when they won 1–0 in their first encounter in the "Oberliga Hamburg". Matches between Hamburger SV and FC St. Pauli were played almost every year before the two sides parted ways after the Bundesliga was founded in 1963: HSV became the record champions of the Oberliga Nord in the Bundesliga, while FC St. Pauli played in the Regionalliga Nord. In 1974, they moved up to the newly founded 2. Bundesliga and in 1977, they succeeded in advancing to the Bundesliga, making this the first Hamburg city derby to be held in the Bundesliga. In the previous season, the 1976/77 season, HSV won the 1976-77 European Cup Winners' Cup and was therefore considered the more successful club. Nevertheless, FC St. Pauli won the match in the Volksparkstadion, the home ground of HSV, 2–0. The return match was also played in the Hamburger SV stadium, although FC St. Pauli was the home team. HSV won this match 3–2, and FC St. Pauli retired from the Bundesliga at the end of the 1977/78 season. The next clash occurred in the 1986/87 season, when Hamburger SV played FC St. Pauli in the DFB Cup. HSV won 6–0 in their own stadium.

From 1988 to 1991, from 1995 to 1997, and in the 2001–02 season, FC St. Pauli played in the Bundesliga again, playing the city derbies, in which they had home rights, in the Volksparkstadion. Out of a total of 12 games, they were unable to win any of them (five draws, seven defeats). After FC St. Pauli was relegated to the 2. Bundesliga at the end of the 2001–02 season, they even had to play in the Regionalliga Nord in 2003. In 2007 FC St. Pauli returned to the 2. Bundesliga, and in 2010 the "Kiezkickers" finally made it back to the Bundesliga. The first leg on 19 October 2010 was the first game since 1962 to be played in an FC St. Pauli stadium. This ended with a 1–1 draw. In the return match on 16 February 2011 in the Volksparkstadion, FC St. Pauli won 1–0 through Gerald Asamoah's goal, it was FC St. Pauli's first win against Hamburger SV since 1977. Nevertheless, the club from the St. Pauli quarter relegated to the 2. Bundesliga at the end of the 2010–11 season.

With the relegation of Hamburger SV into 2. Bundesliga in 2018, the Hamburg derbies became more frequent. The first leg in the 2018–19 season was hosted in Volksparkstadion and ended with a goalless draw; HSV won the second leg 4–0 at Millerntor-Stadion, their first away victory in the derby in a league match in 57 years. Nevertheless, HSV missed the return to Bundesliga and placed fourth. Afterwards, St. Pauli won four of the next five fixtures in the derby, and before the league match at Volksparkstadion in January 2022, the Kiezkicker was the leader of the table, but HSV won 2–1, the first home win in over 20 years in the Hamburg derby. To the end of the 2021–22 season, FC St. Pauli missed the promotion to Bundesliga and placed fifth; Hamburger SV placed third and qualified for the promotion/relegation play-offs against Hertha Berlin. HSV won the first leg 1–0, but lost the second-leg 0–2 and missed out on promotion to Bundesliga.

Following Hamburger SV's promotion to the Bundesliga for the 2025–26 Bundesliga, the Hamburg derby will return to the top division for the first time in 14 years.

== Fans ==
Since the 1980s the derby is seen as both a clash of football and political ideology. Given the location of HSV's Volksparkstadion, St. Pauli fans often mock HSV to be a Vorstadtverein (suburban club) or St. Ellingen as HSV's Volksparkstadion is located at the outskirts of Hamburg. Conversely, HSV supporters mock St. Pauli - in particular their popular slogan Hamburg ist braun-weiß (Hamburg is brown-white; their colors) - as a small club whose fans are regarded as being more interested in political slogans than football.

The political divide was particularly notable in the 1980s, when the HSV fan scene had a small contingent of organized neo-nazi groups. St Pauli's supporter base is more left-wing due to its popularity among squatters and counterculture subcultures of the local area in the 80s, specifically when squatters from the Hafenstrasse and Rote Flora started attending St. Pauli matches and created the leftist fan scene the club is known for today. In recent years, this has extended beyond Hamburg all across Germany and Europe. Additionally, over time HSV has developed a more inclusive fanbase, such as signing a refugee player and having a first team coach of color.

In 2018 there were clashes between the supporters. HSV ultras disrupted a concert where there were bands linked to St. Pauli playing. Subsequently, St. Pauli fans attacked their rivals' choreography preparations, injuring two HSV ultras in the process.

== Results ==
Hamburger SV win FC St. Pauli win Draw

Date	Venue	Score	Competition
13 November 1960	Millerntor-Stadion	1–6	1960–61 Oberliga Nord
11 March 1961	Volksparkstadion	2–2	1960–61 Oberliga Nord
16 September 1961	Volksparkstadion	3–1	1961–62 Oberliga Nord
11 March 1962	Millerntor-Stadion	1–2	1961–62 Oberliga Nord
7 October 1962	Millerntor-Stadion	1–3	1962–63 Oberliga Nord
16 February 1963	Volksparkstadion	3–2	1962–63 Oberliga Nord
2 August 1972	Millerntor-Stadion	1–4	1972–73 DFB Ligapokal (group stage)
24 August 1972	Sportplatz at Rothenbaum	0–0	1972–73 DFB Ligapokal (group stage)
3 September 1977	Volksparkstadion	0–2	1977–78 Bundesliga
28 January 1978	Volksparkstadion	2–3	1977–78 Bundesliga
19 November 1986	Volksparkstadion	6–0	1986–87 DFB Pokal (RO16)
3 September 1988	Volksparkstadion	1–1	1988–89 Bundesliga
23 March 1989	Volksparkstadion	1–2	1988–89 Bundesliga
16 September 1989	Volksparkstadion	0–0	1989–90 Bundesliga
24 March 1990	Volksparkstadion	0–0	1989–90 Bundesliga
25 November 1990	Volksparkstadion	0–2	1990–91 Bundesliga
1 June 1991	Volksparkstadion	5–0	1990–91 Bundesliga
24 November 1995	Volksparkstadion	1–0	1995–96 Bundesliga
5 May 1996	Volksparkstadion	1–1	1995–96 Bundesliga
15 September 1996	Volksparkstadion	3–0	1996–97 Bundesliga
14 March 1997	Volksparkstadion	2–2	1996–97 Bundesliga
2 December 2001	Volksparkstadion	4–3	2001–02 Bundesliga
19 April 2002	Volksparkstadion	0–4	2001–02 Bundesliga
19 September 2010	Millerntor-Stadion	1–1	2010–11 Bundesliga
16 February 2011	Volksparkstadion	0–1	2010–11 Bundesliga
30 September 2018	Volksparkstadion	0–0	2018–19 2. Bundesliga
10 March 2019	Millerntor-Stadion	0–4	2018–19 2. Bundesliga
16 September 2019	Millerntor-Stadion	2–0	2019–20 2. Bundesliga
22 February 2020	Volksparkstadion	0–2	2019–20 2. Bundesliga
30 October 2020	Volksparkstadion	2–2	2020–21 2. Bundesliga
1 March 2021	Millerntor-Stadion	1–0	2020–21 2. Bundesliga
13 August 2021	Millerntor-Stadion	3–2	2021–22 2. Bundesliga
21 January 2022	Volksparkstadion	2–1	2021–22 2. Bundesliga
14 October 2022	Millerntor-Stadion	3–0	2022–23 2. Bundesliga
21 April 2023	Volksparkstadion	4–3	2022–23 2. Bundesliga
1 December 2023	Millerntor-Stadion	2–2	2023–24 2. Bundesliga
3 May 2024	Volksparkstadion	1–0	2023–24 2. Bundesliga
29 August 2025	Volksparkstadion	0–2	2025–26 Bundesliga
23 January 2026	Millerntor-Stadion	0–0	2025–26 Bundesliga

== All matches ==
As of 23 January 2026

Competitions	Matches	Wins Hamburg	Draws	Wins St.Pauli	Goals Hamburg	Goals St.Pauli
Bundesliga matches	18	8	7	3	29	16
2. Bundesliga matches	12	4	3	5	17	19
DFB-Pokal matches	3	3	0	0	14	2
DFB-Ligapokal matches	2	1	1	0	4	1
Local and regional matches	78	54	7	17	283	89
Total matches	113	70	18	25	347	127

== Major honours ==
Competition	Hamburger SV	FC St. Pauli
German champions/ Bundesliga	6	0
2. Bundesliga	0	2
DFB-Pokal	3	0
DFL-Ligapokal	2	0
UEFA Champions League	1	0
UEFA Cup Winners' Cup	1	0
UEFA Intertoto Cup	2	0
Total	14	2
