= 2017–18 FC St. Pauli season =

FC St. Pauli
2017–18 season
- President: Oke Göttlich
- Manager: Olaf Janßen (until 7 December 2017); Markus Kauczinski (since 7 December 2017)
- Stadium: Millerntor-Stadion
- 2. Bundesliga: 12th
- DFB-Pokal: First round
- Top goalscorer: League: six players (4); All: Sami Allagui (5)
Home colours	Away colours	Third colours
- All statistics correct as of 25 June 2018.

The 2017–18 FC St. Pauli season is the 107th season in the football club's history and 7th consecutive season in the second division of German football, the 2. Bundesliga and 25th overall. In addition to the domestic league, FC St. Pauli also are participating in this season's edition of the domestic cup, the DFB-Pokal. This is the 55th season for FC St. Pauli in the Millerntor-Stadion, located in St. Pauli, Hamburg, Germany. The season covers a period from 1 July 2017 to 30 June 2018.

== Players ==
=== Squad information ===
As of 20 June 2017

Note: Flags indicate national team as defined under FIFA eligibility rules; some limited exceptions apply. Players may hold more than one non-FIFA nationality.

No.	Pos.	Nation	Player
1	GK	GER	Philipp Heerwagen
2	DF	GER	Clemens Schoppenhauer
3	DF	GER	Lasse Sobiech
4	DF	GER	Philipp Ziereis
5	DF	SUI	Joël Keller
6	MF	GER	Christopher Avevor
7	MF	GER	Bernd Nehrig (Captain)
8	MF	GER	Jeremy Dudziak
9	FW	MAR	Aziz Bouhaddouz
10	MF	GER	Christopher Buchtmann
11	FW	TUN	Sami Allagui
13	MF	JPN	Ryo Miyaichi
14	MF	NOR	Mats Møller Dæhli (on loan from SC Freiburg)
15	DF	GER	Daniel Buballa
16	DF	GER	Marc Hornschuh
19	DF	GER	Luca-Milan Zander (on loan from Werder Bremen)

No.	Pos.	Nation	Player
20	MF	GER	Richard Neudecker
22	MF	TUR	Cenk Şahin
23	MF	GER	Johannes Flum
27	DF	GER	Jan-Philipp Kalla
28	MF	POL	Waldemar Sobota
29	FW	GER	Jan-Marc Schneider
30	GK	GER	Robin Himmelmann
31	MF	GER	Maurice Litka
33	GK	GER	Svend Brodersen
35	DF	GER	Brian Koglin
37	MF	KOR	Choi Kyoung-rok
39	DF	KOR	Park Yi-young
41	MF	GER	Ersin Zehir
42	MF	BEL	Thibaud Verlinden (on loan from Stoke City)
45	FW	GRE	Dimitrios Diamantakos

=== Transfers ===
==== Summer ====
In:

No.	Pos.	Nation	Player
2	DF	GER	Clemens Schoppenhauer (from Würzburger Kickers)
11	FW	TUN	Sami Allagui (from Hertha BSC)
19	DF	GER	Luca-Milan Zander (on loan from Werder Bremen)
22	MF	TUR	Cenk Şahin (from İstanbul Başakşehir F.K., previously on loan)

Out:

No.	Pos.	Nation	Player
18	FW	GER	Lennart Thy (loan return to Werder Bremen)
24	FW	GER	Nico Empen (to ETSV Weiche)
25	MF	GER	Dennis Rosin (to Werder Bremen II)
26	DF	GER	Sören Gonther (to Dynamo Dresden)

==== Winter ====
In:

No.	Pos.	Nation	Player
42	MF	BEL	Thibaud Verlinden (on loan from Stoke City)
45	FW	GRE	Dimitrios Diamantakos (from VfL Bochum)

Out:

No.	Pos.	Nation	Player

== Matches ==
=== Legend ===
Win Draw Loss

=== Friendly matches ===
24 June 2017 Friendly	Buxtehuder SV	0−11	FC St. Pauli	Buxtehude
15:00		Report	Sobota 16', 31'; Miyaichi 17'; Allagui 19'; Zander 50'; Schneider 60'; Buchtmann 67', 87'; Litka 71'; Şahin 72'; Park 75'	Stadium: Jahnstadion Buxtehude

1 July 2017 Friendly	Sportfreunde Lotte	0−1	FC St. Pauli	Ahlerstedt
15:30		Report	Sobiech 112'	Stadium: Sportanlage Am Auetal

7 July 2017 Friendly	VfL Osnabrück	0−3	FC St. Pauli	Osnabrück
18:30		Report	Buballa 10'; Allagui 32', 40'	Stadium: Osnatel-Arena; Attendance: 2,500; Referee: Franz Bokop

8 July 2017 Friendly	VfB Oldenburg	1−2	FC St. Pauli	Varel
14:30	Oliveira 55'	Report	Nehring 45' (pen.); Sobotta 90+1'	Stadium: Waldstadion Varel; Attendance: 2,500

12 July 2017 Friendly	FC Pinzgau Saalfelden	1−2	FC St. Pauli	Saalfelden, Austria
17:30	Hašić 21'	Report	Buchtmann 33'; Sobota 75'	Stadium: Sportanlage Bürgerau

16 July 2017 Friendly	FC Wil	1−2	FC St. Pauli	Saalfelden, Austria
14:30	Zé Eduardo 90'	Report	Nehrig 21'; Allagui 47'	Stadium: Sportanlage Bürgerau

22 July 2017 Friendly	FC St. Pauli	2−1	Werder Bremen	Hamburg
15:00	Bouhaddouz 22', 68'	Report	Bartels 55'	Stadium: Millerntor-Stadion; Attendance: 20,026; Referee: Robert Schröder (Hanover)

1 August 2017 Friendly	FC St. Pauli	4−2	Stoke City	Hamburg
18:30	Allagui 11'; Litka 21'; Choi 59'; Şahin 83' (pen.)	Report	Joselu 41', 67'	Stadium: Millerntor-Stadion; Attendance: 14,500; Referee: Tobias Stieler (Hamburg)

1 September 2017 Friendly	FC St. Pauli	3−0	FC Groningen	Rotenburg an der Wümme
18:00	Neudecker 59'; Sobota 67' (pen.), 86'	Report		Stadium: Sportanlage In der Ahe; Attendance: 700; Referee: Harm Osmers (Hanover)

5 October 2017 Friendly	FC St. Pauli	v	Odense	Hamburg
14:00				Stadium: Millerntor-Stadion
Note: The match was cancelled due to water-logged pitch following heavy rains on that day.

10 November 2017 Friendly	FC St. Pauli	3−1	Odense	Hamburg
19:00	Bouhaddouz 33', 41' (pen.); Allagui 87'	Report	Edmundsson 80'	Stadium: Millerntor-Stadion; Attendance: 4,498; Referee: Sven Jablonski (Bremen)

5 January 2018 Friendly	FC St. Pauli	1−3	VfL Wolfsburg	Marbella, Spain
15:00	Sobota 3'	Report	Bruma 11'; Osimhen 26'; Didavi 81'	Stadium: Marbella Football Center; Attendance: 150

11 January 2018 Friendly	FC St. Pauli	1−0	Tianjin Quanjian	Coín, Spain
16:00	Bouhaddouz 31'	Report		Stadium: Estadio Jose Burgos Quintana

17 January 2018 Friendly	FC St. Pauli	1−1	VfL Bochum	Hamburg
18:00	Allagui 12'	Report	Wurtz 20'	Stadium: Millerntor-Stadion; Attendance: 2,823; Referee: Patrick Ittrich (Hamburg)

22 March 2018 Friendly	1. FSV Mainz 05	1−2	FC St. Pauli	Mainz
15:00	Dudziak 37' (o.g.)	Report	Neudecker 17'; Zander 49'	Stadium: Bruchwegstadion; Attendance: 2,823; Referee: Nicolas Winter (Scheibenhardt)

19 May 2018 Friendly	Detroit City FC	2−6	FC St. Pauli	Detroit, United States
18:00	Amann 8'; Edwardson (yellow card) 43'; Mentzingen 85'	Report	Allagui 21', 32'; Lee 28', 88'; Sobota 53'; Diamantakos 66'	Stadium: Keyworth Stadium; Attendance: 7,264

23 May 2018 Friendly	Portland Timbers 2	2−2 (4–2 p)	FC St. Pauli	Portland, United States
	Flores (yellow card) 23'; Williams 72', 81'; Diz (red card) 86'	Report	Allagui 4'; Diamantakos 63'; Sobiech (yellow card) 78'; Zehir (red card) 86'	Stadium: Providence Park; Attendance: 5,774
	Penalties
	Vytas (penalty scored); Lewis (penalty scored); Langsdorf (penalty scored); Zambrano (penalty scored)		Diamantakos (penalty scored); Sobiech (penalty missed); Koglin (penalty scored); Sobota (penalty missed)

=== 2. Bundesliga ===
==== League table ====
Pos	Team	Pld	W	D	L	GF	GA	GD	Pts
10	Darmstadt 98	34	10	13	11	47	45	+2	43
11	SV Sandhausen	34	11	10	13	35	33	+2	43
12	FC St. Pauli	34	11	10	13	35	48	−13	43
13	1. FC Heidenheim	34	11	9	14	50	56	−6	42
14	Dynamo Dresden	34	11	8	15	42	52	−10	41

Source: DFB
Rules for classification: 1) Points; 2) Goal difference; 3) Goals scored

==== Results summary ====
Overall								Home						Away					
Pld	W	D	L	GF	GA	GD	Pts	W	D	L	GF	GA	GD	W	D	L	GF	GA	GD
34	11	10	13	35	48	−13	43	5	8	4	20	20	0	6	2	9	15	28	−13

Last updated: 13 May 2018.
Source: Kicker

==== Results by round ====
Round	1	2	3	4	5	6	7	8	9	10	11	12	13	14	15	16	17	18	19	20	21	22	23	24	25	26	27	28	29	30	31	32	33	34
Ground	A	H	A	H	A	H	A	H	A	H	A	H	A	H	A	A	H	H	A	H	A	H	A	H	A	H	A	H	A	H	A	H	H	A
Result	W	D	L	W	W	L	W	L	W	D	D	D	L	D	L	L	D	W	W	L	L	D	W	W	L	D	D	D	L	L	L	W	W	L
Position	4	6	10	8	5	7	7	8	6	7	6	5	6	7	8	14	15	10	8	10	11	11	11	9	10	10	11	10	15	16	16	13	10	12

Updated to match(es) played on 13 May 2018. Source: Kicker
A = Away; H = Home; W = Win; D = Draw; L = Loss

==== Matches ====
28 July 2017 1	VfL Bochum	0−1	FC St. Pauli	Bochum
20:30	Soares (yellow card) 17'	DFL report Kicker Report; FCSP Report	Kalla (yellow card) 34'; Buchtmann 65'	Stadium: Vonovia Ruhrstadion; Attendance: 27,350; Referee: Bastian Dankert (Rostock)

7 August 2017 2	FC St. Pauli	2−2	Dynamo Dresden	Hamburg
20:30	Nehrig (yellow card) 1'; Buchtmann 22', 69'	DFL Report; Kicker Report; FCSP Report	J. Müller (yellow card) 9'; Hartmann 29'; Röser 73'; Ballas (yellow card) 79'; Benatelli (yellow card) 90+5'	Stadium: Millerntor-Stadion; Attendance: 28,699; Referee: Guido Winkmann (Kerken)

18 August 2017 3	SV Darmstadt 98	3−0	FC St. Pauli	Darmstadt
18:30	Großkreutz 9'; Kempe 49' (pen.); Holland (yellow card) 55'; Mehlem (yellow card) 60'; Stark 82'	DFL Report; Kicker Report; FCSP Report	Avevor (yellow card) 59'; Allagui (penalty missed) 68'	Stadium: Merck-Stadion am Böllenfalltor; Attendance: 17,400; Referee: Arne Aarnink (Nordhorn)

26 August 2017 4	FC St. Pauli	1−0	1. FC Heidenheim	Hamburg
13:00	Flum 90+3'	DFL Report; Kicker Report; FCSP Report	Feick (yellow card) 61'; Dovedan (yellow card) 77'; Pusch (yellow card) 87'	Stadium: Millerntor-Stadion; Attendance: 29,546; Referee: Thorben Siewer (Olpe)

11 September 2017 5	1. FC Nürnberg	0−1	FC St. Pauli	Nuremberg
20:30	Valentini (yellow card) 18'; Ewerton (yellow card) 45+3'	FCSP Report; Kicker Report; DFL Report	Nehrig (yellow card) 48'; Dudziak (yellow card) 53'; Sobota 63'	Stadium: Max-Morlock-Stadion; Attendance: 27,375; Referee: Daniel Schlager (Rastatt)

16 September 2017 6	FC St. Pauli	0−4	FC Ingolstadt 04	Hamburg
13:00		FCSP Report; Kicker Report; DFL Report	Kittel 6', 45+3', (yellow card) 70'; Wahl (yellow card) 10'; Matip (yellow card) 19'; Träsch 33'; Lezcano 40'; Gaus (yellow card) 43'; Christiansen (yellow card) 87'	Stadium: Millerntor-Stadion; Attendance: 29,546; Referee: Robert Schröder (Hanover)

19 September 2017 7	Holstein Kiel	0−1	FC St. Pauli	Kiel
18:30	Drexler (yellow card) 43'; Herrmann (yellow card) 53' (yellow-red card) 83'; Heidinger (yellow card) 70'	FCSP Report; Kicker Report; DFL Report	Zander (yellow card) 35'; Bouhaddouz (yellow card) 40'; Flum 44', (yellow card) 88'; Sobiech (yellow card) 45+1'	Stadium: Holstein-Stadion; Attendance: 12,000; Referee: Harm Osmers (Hanover)

23 September 2017 8	FC St. Pauli	1−2	Fortuna Düsseldorf	Hamburg
13:00	Şahin 34'; Sobota (yellow card) 60'	FCSP Report; Kicker Report; DFL Report	Usami 9'; Hennings 23'	Stadium: Millerntor-Stadion; Attendance: 29,546; Referee: Felix Brych (Munich)

1 October 2017 9	Eintracht Braunschweig	0−2	FC St. Pauli	Braunschweig
13:30	Hernández (penalty missed) 12'	FCSP; Kicker Report; DFL Report	Buchtmann 76'; Şahin 80'	Stadium: Eintracht-Stadion; Attendance: 22,695; Referee: Manuel Gräfe (Berlin)

13 October 2017 10	FC St. Pauli	1−1	1. FC Kaiserslautern	Hamburg
18:30	Allagui 63'	FCSP Report; Kicker Report; DFL Report	Kessel (yellow card) 59'; Andersson 77'	Stadium: Millerntor-Stadion; Attendance: 29,546; Referee: Sascha Stegemann (Niederkassel)

23 October 2017 11	SV Sandhausen	1−1	FC St. Pauli	Sandhausen
20:30	Paqarada (yellow card) 49'; Stiefler 80'	FCSP Report; Kicker Report; DFL Report	Zander (yellow card) 36'; Buballa (yellow card) 85'; Schneider 90'	Stadium: BWT-Stadion am Hardtwald; Attendance: 8,514; Referee: Markus Schmidt (Stuttgart)

27 October 2017 12	FC St. Pauli	1−1	FC Erzgebirge Aue	Hamburg
18:30	Dudziak 33'; Buchtmann (yellow card) 88'	FCSP Report; Kicker Report; DFL Report	Wydra (yellow card) 16'; Kempe 70', (yellow card) 87'; Rizzuto (yellow card) 89'	Stadium: Millerntor-Stadion; Attendance: 28,742; Referee: Benedikt Kempkes (Thür)

4 November 2017 13	1. FC Union Berlin	1−0	FC St. Pauli	Berlin
13:00	Trimmel (yellow card) 80'; Polter 90+2'	FCSP Report; Kicker Report; DFL Report	Allagui (yellow card) 34'	Stadium: Stadion An der Alten Försterei; Attendance: 22,012; Referee: Bastian Dankert (Rostock)

19 November 2017 14	FC St. Pauli	2−2	SSV Jahn Regensburg	Hamburg
13:30	Buballa (yellow card) 3'; Buchtmann (yellow card) 28'; Sobiech 40'; Allagui 45'	FCSP Report; Kicker Report; DFL Report	Grüttner 21'; Adamyan 24', (yellow card) 26'; Lais (yellow card) 36'; Nandzik (yellow card) 48'; Hofrath (yellow card) 78'; Geipl (yellow card) 85'	Stadium: Millerntor-Stadion; Attendance: 29,546; Referee: Florian Heft (Neuenkirchen)

26 November 2017 15	SpVgg Greuther Fürth	4−0	FC St. Pauli	Fürth
13:30	Pintér (yellow card) 26'; Wittek 33'; Hilbert (yellow card) 35'; Raum 45'; Narey 72'; Green 79'	FCSP Report; Kicker Report; DFL Report	Nehrig (yellow card) 39' (yellow-red card) 63'; Flum (yellow card) 60'; Sobiech (yellow card) 62'; Şahin (yellow card) 83'	Stadium: Sportpark Ronhof Thomas Sommer; Attendance: 10,810; Referee: Martin Thomsen (Kleve)

1 December 2017 16	Arminia Bielefeld	5−0	FC St. Pauli	Bielefeld
18:30	Putaro 38'; Dick 53'; Hartherz 62'; Börner (yellow card) 67'; Kerschbaumer 77'; Klos 85'	FCSP Report; Kicker Report; DFL Report	Bouhaddouz (yellow card) 82'	Stadium: SchücoArena; Attendance: 22,826; Referee: Robert Kempter (Stockach)

10 December 2017 17	FC St. Pauli	2−2	MSV Duisburg	Hamburg
13:30	Bouhaddouz (yellow card) 34' (red card) 68'; Şahin (yellow card) 41'; Sobota 57', (yellow card) 68'; Sobiech 62' (pen.); Allagui (yellow card) 67'	FCSP Report; Kicker Report; DFL Report	Nauber (yellow card) 23'; Wolze 32' (pen.); Hajri (yellow card) 59'; Iljutcenko (yellow card) 61' (goal) 81'; Bomheuer (yellow card) 75'	Stadium: Millerntor-Stadion; Attendance: 29,546; Referee: Christian Dietz (Munich)

18 December 2017 18	FC St. Pauli	2−1	VfL Bochum	Hamburg
20:30	Park (yellow card) 19'; Sobiech 34'; Schneider 49'; Flum (yellow card) 78'	FCSP Report; Kicker Report; DFL Report	Janelt (yellow card) 17'; Losilla (yellow card) 33' (yellow-red card); Hinterseer 75'; Stöger (yellow card) 78'	Stadium: Millerntor-Stadion; Attendance: 29,005; Referee: Bibiana Steinhaus (Langenhagen)

25 January 2018 19	Dynamo Dresden	1−3	FC St. Pauli	Dresden
20:30	Berko (yellow card) 23'; Hauptmann (yellow card) 30'; Konrad (yellow card) 53'; Röser 88'	FCSP Report; Kicker Report; DFL Report	Sobota 8', 81'; Dudziak (yellow card) 19'; Neudecker 71'	Stadium: DDV-Stadion; Attendance: 28,706; Referee: Deniz Aytekin (Oberasbach)

28 January 2018 20	FC St. Pauli	0−1	SV Darmstadt 98	Hamburg
13:30	Zander (yellow card) 90+3'	FCSP Report; Kicker Report; DFL Report	Jones 7', (yellow card) 32'; Kempe (yellow card) 80'	Stadium: Millerntor-Stadion; Attendance: 29,546; Referee: Sascha Stegemann (Niederkassel)

3 February 2018 21	1. FC Heidenheim	3−1	FC St. Pauli	Heidenheim an der Brenz
13:00	Beermann 15'; Thiel 16'; Verhoek 48'	FCSP Report; Kicker Report; DFL Report	Bouhaddouz 8'; Sobiech (yellow card) 27'; Dudziak (yellow card) 90+3'	Stadium: Voith-Arena; Attendance: 12,300; Referee: Patrick Alt (Heusweiler)

12 February 2018 22	FC St. Pauli	0−0	1. FC Nürnberg	Hamburg
20:30	Nehrig (yellow card) 42'	FCSP Report; Kicker Report; DFL Report	Werner (yellow card) 26'; Ewerton (yellow card) 47'; Valentini (yellow card) 88'	Stadium: Millerntor-Stadion; Attendance: 29,313; Referee: Felix Zwayer (Berlin)

17 February 2018 23	FC Ingolstadt 04	0−1	FC St. Pauli	Ingolstadt
13:00	Matip (yellow card) 70'; Kittel (yellow card) 90+4'	FCSP Report; Kicker Report; DFL Report	Sobiech (yellow card) 19'; Allagui 30'; Nehrig (yellow card) 79'	Stadium: Audi Sportpark; Attendance: 10,071; Referee: Sven Waschitzki (Essen)

25 February 2018 24	FC St. Pauli	3−2	Holstein Kiel	Hamburg
13:30	Neudecker 11', 74'; Nehrig (yellow card) 25'; Avevor 89'	FCSP Report; Kicker Report; DFL Report	Schindler 14'; Czichos (yellow card) 16'; Ducksch 19'; Peitz (yellow card) 31'; Van den Bergh (yellow card) 83'	Stadium: Millerntor-Stadion; Attendance: 29,546; Referee: Felix Brych (Munich)

4 March 2018 25	Fortuna Düsseldorf	2−1	FC St. Pauli	Düsseldorf
13:30	Hoffmann 8'; Hennings (yellow card) 13'; Usami 74'	FCSP Report; Kicker Report; DFL Report	Bouhaddouz 90+1'	Stadium: Esprit Arena; Attendance: 37,208; Referee: Timo Gerach (Landau)

10 March 2018 26	FC St. Pauli	0−0	Eintracht Braunschweig	Hamburg
13:00	Nehrig (yellow card) 14'; Neudecker (yellow card) 69'	FCSP Report; Kicker Report; DFL Report	Abdullahi (yellow card) 66'; Boland (yellow card) 86'	Stadium: Millerntor-Stadion; Attendance: 29,546; Referee: Markus Schmidt (Stuttgart)

17 March 2018 27	1. FC Kaiserslautern	1−1	FC St. Pauli	Kaiserslautern
13:00	Callsen-Bracker (red card) 71'; Spalvis 84'	FCSP Report; Kicker Report; DFL Report	Şahin (yellow card) 17'; Bouhaddouz 73' (pen.); Park (yellow card) 76'; Allagui (yellow card) 87'	Stadium: Fritz-Walter-Stadion; Attendance: 32,243; Referee: Frank Willenborg (Osnabrück)

1 April 2018 28	FC St. Pauli	1−1	SV Sandhausen	Hamburg
13:30	Allagui 26'; Bouhaddouz (penalty missed) 67'; Park (yellow card) 68'; Dudziak (yellow card) 77'	FCSP Report; Kicker Report; DFL Report	Gíslason 54'; Karl (yellow card) 66'; Linsmayer (yellow card) 90+1'	Stadium: Millerntor-Stadion; Attendance: 29,381; Referee: Alexander Sather (Grimma)

7 April 2018 29	FC Erzgebirge Aue	2−1	FC St. Pauli	Aue
13:00	Fandrich 25'; Hertner (yellow card) 69'; Kvesić 82' (pen.); Rizzuto (yellow card) 86'	FCSP Report; Kicker Report; DFL Report	Dudziak (yellow card) 38'; Bouhaddouz 44', (yellow card) 90+3'; Buchtmann (yellow card) 56'; Buballa (yellow card) 81'	Stadium: Sparkassen-Erzgebirgsstadion; Attendance: 14,700; Referee: Christof Günsch (Marburg)

14 April 2018 30	FC St. Pauli	0−1	1. FC Union Berlin	Hamburg
13:00	Buballa (yellow card) 71'; Şahin (yellow card) 90'	FCSP Report; Kicker Report; DFL Report	Friedrich (yellow card) 5' (yellow-red card) 56'; Hartel (yellow card) 45+1'; Hedlund 81'; Kroos (yellow card) 86'	Stadium: Millerntor-Stadion; Attendance: 29,546; Referee: Daniel Schlager (Rastatt)

21 April 2018 31	SSV Jahn Regensburg	3−1	FC St. Pauli	Regensburg
13:00	Grüttner 10'; Knoll (yellow card) 16'; Palionis (yellow card) 26'; Adamyan 21'; Lais (yellow card) 42'; Mees 48', (yellow card) 56'	FCSP Report; Kicker Report; DFL Report	Neudecker (yellow card) 38'; Kalla (yellow card) 45+1'; Allagui (red card) 45+1'; Diamantakos (yellow card) 52'; Flum 53'; Şahin (red card) 75'	Stadium: Continental Arena; Attendance: 15,224; Referee: Matthias Jöllenbeck (Freiburg)

28 April 2018 32	FC St. Pauli	3−0	SpVgg Greuther Fürth	Hamburg
13:00	Diamantakos 7'; Flum 39'; Neudecker 61'; Kalla (yellow card) 80'; Park (yellow card) 88'	FCSP Report; Kicker Report; DFL Report	Hilbert (yellow card) 90+1'	Stadium: Millerntor-Stadion; Attendance: 29,005; Referee: Manuel Gräfe (Berlin)

6 May 2018 33	FC St. Pauli	1−0	Arminia Bielefeld	Hamburg
15:30	Park 39'	FCSP Report; Kicker Report; DFL Report	Salger (yellow card) 2'	Stadium: Millerntor-Stadion; Attendance: 29,546; Referee: Markus Schmidt (Stuttgart)

13 May 2018 34	MSV Duisburg	2−0	FC St. Pauli	Duisburg
15:30	Gartner (yellow card) 42', (goal) 90+5'; Stoppelkamp 45+2'; Iljutcenko (yellow card) 89'	FCSP Report; Kicker Report; DFL Report	Diamantakos (yellow card) 32'; Neudecker (yellow card) 56'	Stadium: MSV-Arena; Attendance: 25,325; Referee: Deniz Aytekin (Oberasbach)

=== DFB-Pokal ===
14 August 2017 R1	SC Paderborn	2−1	FC St. Pauli	Paderborn
18:30	Zolinski (yellow card) 30'; Wassey 41'; Schonlau (yellow card) 73'; Antwi-Adjej 79'; Strohdiek (yellow card) 90+5'	DFB Report; Kicker Report; FCSP Report	Allagui 90+1'	Stadium: Benteler-Arena; Attendance: 15,000; Referee: Sven Jablonski (Bremen)

== Squad and statistics ==
As of 13 May 2018

No.	Pos	Player	2. Bundesliga		DFB-Pokal		Total	
No.	Pos	Player	Apps	Goals	Apps	Goals	Apps	Goals
1	GK	(Germany) Philipp Heerwagen	0	0	1	0	1	0
2	DF	(Germany) Clemens Schoppenhauer	1+1	0	0	0	2	0
3	DF	(Germany) Lasse Sobiech	24+2	3	1	0	27	3
4	DF	(Germany) Philipp Ziereis	7+1	0	0	0	8	0
5	DF	(Switzerland) Joël Keller	0	0	0	0	0	0
6	MF	(Germany) Christopher Avevor	32+1	1	0	0	33	1
7	MF	(Germany) Bernd Nehrig	24	0	1	0	25	0
8	MF	(Germany) Jeremy Dudziak	22+4	1	0+1	0	27	1
9	FW	(Morocco) Aziz Bouhaddouz	19+7	4	1	0	27	4
10	MF	(Germany) Christopher Buchtmann	15+2	4	1	0	18	4
11	FW	(Tunisia) Sami Allagui	26+5	4	0+1	1	32	5
13	MF	(Japan) Ryo Miyaichi	0	0	0	0	0	0
14	MF	(Norway) Mats Møller Dæhli	15+6	0	1	0	22	0
15	DF	(Germany) Daniel Buballa	29+1	0	1	0	31	0
16	DF	(Germany) Marc Hornschuh	6	0	1	0	7	0
19	DF	(Germany) Luca-Milan Zander	16+2	0	0	0	18	0
20	MF	(Germany) Richard Neudecker	13+7	4	0	0	20	4
22	MF	(Turkey) Cenk Şahin	16+7	2	1	0	24	2
23	MF	(Germany) Johannes Flum	18+12	4	0	0	30	4
27	DF	(Germany) Jan-Philipp Kalla	5+6	0	1	0	12	0
28	MF	(Poland) Waldemar Sobota	23+4	4	0+1	0	28	4
29	FW	(Germany) Jan-Marc Schneider	4+11	2	0	0	15	2
30	GK	(Germany) Robin Himmelmann	34	0	0	0	34	0
31	MF	(Germany) Maurice Litka	4+6	0	1	0	11	0
33	GK	(Germany) Svend Brodersen	0	0	0	0	0	0
35	DF	(Germany) Brian Koglin	2	0	0	0	2	0
37	MF	(South Korea) Choi Kyoung-rok	0+2	0	0	0	2	0
39	MF	(South Korea) Park Yi-young	13+1	1	0	0	14	1
41	MF	(Germany) Ersin Zehir	0+2	0	0	0	2	0
42	MF	(Belgium) Thibaud Verlinden	0	0	0	0	0	0
45	FW	(Greece) Dimitrios Diamantakos	6+4	1	0	0	10	1
Players transferred out during the season
