= 2016–17 FC St. Pauli season =

FC St. Pauli
2016–17 season
- President: Oke Göttlich
- Manager: Ewald Lienen
- Stadium: Millerntor-Stadion
- 2. Bundesliga: 7th
- DFB-Pokal: Second round
| Home colours | Away colours | Third colours |

The 2016–17 FC St. Pauli season is the club's 106th season of existence, and their sixth consecutive season in the 2. Bundesliga, the second tier of German football.

== Background ==
After narrowingly missing out on promotion during the 2015–16 season, FC. St Pauli started to strengthen the squad in the summer to mount another push for promotion.

== Transfers ==
=== In ===
| Position | Name | From | Fee |
|---|---|---|---|
| GK | (Germany) Jay Lee | (United States) Seattle Sounders FC 2 | free |
| FW | (Poland) Waldemar Sobota | (Belgium) Club Brugge | € 300K |
| FW | (Germany) Marvin Ducksch | (Germany) Borussia Dortmund II | € 250K |
| DF | (Norway) Vegar Eggen Hedenstad | (Germany) SC Freiburg | free |
| MF | (Germany) Christopher Avevor | (Germany) Hannover 96 | free |
| DF | (Denmark) Jacob Rasmussen | (Germany) FC Schalke 04 | free |
| MF | (Germany) Richard Neudecker | (Germany) TSV 1860 München | free |
| FW | (Morocco) Aziz Bouhaddouz | (Germany) SV Sandhausen | free |
| MF | (Turkey) Cenk Sahin | (Turkey) İstanbul Başakşehir F.K. | loan |

=== Out ===
| Position | Name | From | Fee |
|---|---|---|---|
| MF | (Germany) Marc Rzatkowski | (Austria) Red Bull Salzburg | € 2 mln |
| FW | (Croatia) Ante Budimir | (Italy) F.C. Crotone | € 1 mln |
| FW | (Netherlands) John Verhoek | (Germany) 1. FC Heidenheim | free |
| MF | (Germany) Sebastian Maier | (Germany) Hannover 96 | free |
| FW | (Germany) Lennart Thy | (Germany) Werder Bremen | free |
| MF | (Kosovo) Enis Alushi | (Germany) 1.FC Nürnberg | free |
| DF | (Germany) Andrej Startsev | (Germany) TSV Havelse | free |
| MF | (Turkey) Okan Adil Kurt | (Netherlands) Fortuna Sittard | free |
| DF | (Ghana) Davidson Eden | (Denmark) Hobro IK | free |

== Competitions ==
=== Preseason ===
| 2 July 2016 1 | SpVgg Billstedt-Horn | 0–8 | FC St. Pauli | Hamburg |
| 16:00 | | Report | Choi 25'; Buchtmann 28', 40'; Hornschuh 41'; Pasalic 58' (o.g.); Sobiech 65', 81' (pen.); Litka 84' | Stadium: Hein-Klink-Stadion |

| 3 July 2016 2 | FC St. Pauli | 1–0 | FC Viktoria 1889 Berlin | Schwarzenbek |
| 14:00 | Empen 58' | Report | | Stadium: Sportplatz Schützenallee |

| 8 July 2016 3 | SV Babelsberg 03 | 0–3 | FC St. Pauli | Potsdam |
| 18:00 | | Report | Bouhaddouz 52'; Ziereis 63'; Pahl 77' | Stadium: Karl-Liebknecht-Stadion; Attendance: 4,164 |

| 14 July 2016 4 | FC St. Pauli | 2–3 | Borussia Dortmund | Brixen im Thale |
| 18:30 | Empen 60', 79' | Report | Aubameyang 4', 17' (pen.); Mangala 88' | Stadium: Sportplatz SV Brixen; Attendance: 900 |

| 17 July 2016 5 | FC St. Pauli | 2–0 | FC Ufa | Sankt Ulrich am Pillersee |
| 17:15 | Avevor 9'; Sobota 12' | | | Stadium: Der Nuaracher Sportplatz |

| 20 July 2016 6 | FC St. Pauli | 0–1 | FC Zbrojovka Brno | Bischofshofen |
| 18:30 | | Report | Litsingi 46' | Stadium: Sportplatz Bischofshofen |

| 23 July 2016 7 | Cardiff City | 2–1 | FC St. Pauli | Osnabrück |
| 16:45 | Immers 2'; Sobiech 28' (o.g.) | Report | Litka 20' | Stadium: Stadion an der Bremer Brücke |
Note: Match lasted 60 minutes

| 23 July 2016 8 | FC St. Pauli | 0–0 | Borussia Mönchengladbach | Osnabrück |
| 18:00 | | Report | | Stadium: Stadion an der Bremer Brücke |
Note: Match lasted 60 minutes

| 30 July 2016 9 | FC St. Pauli | 1–2 | Sevilla FC | Hamburg |
| 16:00 | Bouhaddouz 36' | Report | Vitolo 53'; Correa 69' | Stadium: Millerntor-Stadion; Attendance: 16,621 |

=== 2. Bundesliga ===
==== Table ====
| Pos | Team | Pld | W | D | L | GF | GA | GD | Pts |
|---|---|---|---|---|---|---|---|---|---|
| 5 | Dynamo Dresden | 34 | 13 | 11 | 10 | 53 | 46 | +7 | 50 |
| 6 | 1. FC Heidenheim | 34 | 12 | 10 | 12 | 43 | 39 | +4 | 46 |
| 7 | FC St. Pauli | 34 | 12 | 9 | 13 | 39 | 35 | +4 | 45 |
| 8 | Greuther Fürth | 34 | 12 | 9 | 13 | 33 | 40 | −7 | 45 |
| 9 | VfL Bochum | 34 | 10 | 14 | 10 | 42 | 47 | −5 | 44 |

Source: DFB
Rules for classification: 1) Points; 2) Goal difference; 3) Goals scored

==== Match results ====
| 8 August 2016 1 | VfB Stuttgart | 2–1 | FC St. Pauli | Stuttgart |
| 20:15 | Maxim 67'; Gentner 87' | Report | Bouhaddouz 28' | Stadium: Mercedes-Benz Arena; Attendance: 60,000; Referee: Benjamin Brand |

| 13 August 2016 2 | FC St. Pauli | 0–2 | Eintracht Braunschweig | Hamburg |
| 15:30 | | Report | Kumbela 40'; Biada 67' | Stadium: Millerntor-Stadion; Attendance: 29,456; Referee: Bastian Dankert |

| 28 August 2016 3 | Dynamo Dresden | 1–0 | FC St. Pauli | Dresden |
| 13:30 | Lambertz 7' | Report | | Stadium: Stadion Dresden; Attendance: 29,350; Referee: Manuel Gräfe |

| 10 September 2016 4 | FC St. Pauli | 2–1 | Arminia Bielefeld | Hamburg |
| 13:00 | Bouhaddouz 38'; Şahin 90' | Report | Schuppan 50' | Stadium: Millerntor-Stadion; Attendance: 29,546; Referee: Robert Kempter (Sauldorf) |

| 18 September 2016 5 | Karlsruher SC | 1–1 | FC St. Pauli | Karlsruhe |
| 13:30 | Diamantakos 57' | Report | Bouhaddouz 32' | Stadium: Wildparkstadion; Attendance: 14,686; Referee: Robert Hartmann (Wangen) |

| 22 September 2016 6 | FC St. Pauli | 2–2 | TSV 1860 München | Hamburg |
| 20:15 | Buchtmann 16'; Nehrig 76' | Report | Liendl 70' (pen.); Andrade 77' | Stadium: Millerntor-Stadion; Referee: Robert Kampka (Mainz) |

| 26 September 2016 7 | 1. FC Union Berlin | 2–0 | FC St. Pauli | Berlin |
| 20:15 | Hosiner 12'; Redondo 42' | Report | | Stadium: Stadion An der Alten Försterei; Attendance: 22,012; Referee: Harm Osmers |

| 1 October 2016 8 | Hannover 96 | 2–0 | FC St. Pauli | Hannover |
| 13:00 | Karaman 75'; Klaus 90+3' | Report | | Stadium: HDI-Arena; Attendance: 49,000; Referee: Felix Brych |

| 14 October 2016 9 | FC St. Pauli | 1–2 | Erzgebirge Aue | Hamburg |
| 18:30 | Ducksch 3' | Report | Köpke 39'; Breitkreuz 90' | Stadium: Millerntor-Stadion; Attendance: 29,075; Referee: Jochen Drees |

| 22 October 2016 10 | SV Sandhausen | 3–0 | FC St. Pauli | Sandhausen |
| 13:00 | Höler 26'; Pledl 45+1'; Wooten 72' | Report | | Stadium: Hardtwaldstadion; Attendance: 6,653; Referee: Florian Badstübner |

| 31 October 2016 11 | FC St. Pauli | 1–1 | 1. FC Nürnberg | Hamburg |
| 20:15 | Buchtmann 6' | Report | Burgstaller 20' | Stadium: Millerntor-Stadion; Attendance: 29,546; Referee: Harm Osmers |

| 7 November 2016 12 | Würzburger Kickers | 1–0 | FC St. Pauli | Würzburg |
| 20:15 | Hedenstad 84' (o.g.) | Report | | Stadium: Flyeralarm Arena; Attendance: 13,080; Referee: Guido Winkmann |

| 20 November 2016 13 | FC St. Pauli | 0–1 | Fortuna Düsseldorf | Hamburg |
| 13:30 | | Report | Buballa 36' (.g.) | Stadium: Millerntor-Stadion; Attendance: 29,546; Referee: Daniel Siebert |

| 26 November 2016 14 | 1. FC Heidenheim | 2–0 | FC St. Pauli | Heidenheim |
| 13:00 | Schnatterer 20', 81' (pen.) | Report | | Stadium: Voith-Arena; Attendance: 12,000; Referee: Benjamin Cortus |

| 2 December 2016 15 | FC St. Pauli | 0–0 | 1. FC Kaiserslautern | Hamburg |
| 18:30 | | Report | | Stadium: Millerntor-Stadion; Attendance: 29,037; Referee: Robert Hartmann |

| 11 December 2016 16 | SpVgg Greuther Fürth | 0–2 | FC St. Pauli | Fürth |
| 13:30 | | Report | Bouhaddouz 64'; C. Şahin 90+1' | Stadium: Sportpark Ronhof; Attendance: 10,015; Referee: Frank Willenborg |

| 17 December 2016 17 | FC St. Pauli | 1–1 | VfL Bochum | Hamburg |
| 12:00 | Bouhaddouz 76' | Report | Mlapa 20' | Stadium: Millerntor-Stadion; Attendance: 29,546; Referee: Felix Zwayer |

| 29 January 2017 18 | FC St. Pauli | 0–1 | VfB Stuttgart | Hamburg |
| 12:30 | | Report | Carlos Mané 84' | Stadium: Millerntor-Stadion; Attendance: 29,546; Referee: Robert Schröder |

| 5 February 2017 19 | Eintracht Braunschweig | 1–2 | FC St. Pauli | Braunschweig |
| 12:30 | Abdullahi 90+6' | Report | Sobiech 7'; Şahin 72' | Stadium: Eintracht-Stadion; Attendance: 22,775; Referee: Christian Dietz |

| 12 February 2017 20 | FC St. Pauli | 2–0 | Dynamo Dresden | Hamburg |
| 12:30 | Choi 28'; Şahin 59' | Report | | Stadium: Millerntor-Stadion; Attendance: 29,546; Referee: Deniz Aytekin |

| 19 February 2017 21 | Arminia Bielefeld | 1–1 | FC St. Pauli | Bielefeld |
| 12:30 | Klos 90+3' | Report | Buchtmann 50' | Stadium: Bielefelder Alm; Attendance: 20,426; Referee: Robert Hartmann |

| 27 February 2017 22 | FC St. Pauli | 5–0 | Karlsruher SC | Hamburg |
| 19:15 | Dæhli 12'; Sobota 50'; Bouhaddouz 52', 58', 79' | Report | | Stadium: Millerntor-Stadion; Attendance: 29,073; Referee: Gunter Perl |

| 4 March 2017 23 | TSV 1860 München | 1–2 | FC St. Pauli | Munich |
| 12:00 | Agbenyenu 27' | Report | Sobiech 36' (pen.); Bouhaddouz 41' | Stadium: Allianz Arena; Attendance: 30,300; Referee: Bibiana Steinhaus |

| 10 March 2017 24 | FC St. Pauli | 1–2 | 1. FC Union Berlin | Hamburg |
| 17:30 | Bouhaddouz 83' | Report | Polter 19'; Kreilach 48' | Stadium: Millerntor-Stadion; Attendance: 29,546; Referee: Sascha Stegemann |

| 18 March 2017 25 | FC St. Pauli | 0–0 | Hannover 96 | Hamburg |
| 12:00 | | Report | | Stadium: Millerntor-Stadion; Attendance: 29,546; Referee: Felix Zwayer |

| 31 March 2017 26 | Erzgebirge Aue | 1–0 | FC St. Pauli | Aue |
| 18:30 CEST | Adler 28' | Report | | Stadium: Erzgebirgsstadion; Attendance: 10,000; Referee: Markus Schmidt |

| 4 April 2017 27 | FC St. Pauli | 0–0 | SV Sandhausen | Hamburg |
| 17:30 CEST | | Report | | Stadium: Millerntor-Stadion; Attendance: 29,085; Referee: Florian Badstübner |

| 7 April 2017 28 | 1. FC Nürnberg | 0–2 | FC St. Pauli | Nuremberg |
| 18:30 CEST | | Report | Bouhaddouz 51', 70' | Stadium: Stadion Nürnberg; Attendance: 28,889; Referee: Daniel Schlager |

| 16 April 2017 29 | FC St. Pauli | 1–0 | Würzburger Kickers | Hamburg |
| 13:30 CEST | Buchtmann 87' | Report | | Stadium: Millerntor-Stadion; Attendance: 29,546; Referee: Sven Jablonski |

| 21 April 2017 30 | Fortuna Düsseldorf | 1–3 | FC St. Pauli | Düsseldorf |
| 18:30 CEST | Bodzek (red card) 66'; Hoffmann 72' (red card) 82' | Report | Ziereis 78'; Buchtmann 83'; Bouhaddouz 90+3' | Stadium: ESPRIT arena Attendance: 28,429; Referee: Benedikt Kempkes |

| 28 April 2017 31 | FC St. Pauli | 3–0 | 1. FC Heidenheim | Hamburg |
| 18:30 CEST | Verhoek 52' (o.g.); Møller Dæhli 56'; Bouhaddouz 62' | Report | Titsch-Rivero (red card) 79' | Stadium: Millerntor-Stadion; Attendance: 29,546; Referee: Robert Schröder |

| 5 May 2017 32 | 1. FC Kaiserslautern | 1–2 | FC St. Pauli | Kaiserslautern |
| 18:30 CEST | Gaus 90' | Report | Bouhaddouz 49'; Buchtmann 69' | Stadium: Fritz-Walter-Stadion; Attendance: 35,781; Referee: Felix Zwayer |

| 14 May 2017 33 | FC St. Pauli | 1–1 | SpVgg Greuther Fürth | Hamburg |
| 15:30 CEST | Sobiech 70' | Report | Zulj 37' | Stadium: Millerntor-Stadion; Attendance: 29,546; Referee: Alexander Sather |

| 21 May 2017 34 | VfL Bochum | 1–3 | FC St. Pauli | Bochum |
| 15:30 CEST | Gündüz 7' | Report | Thy 3', 86'; Sobiech 55' | Stadium: Vonovia-Ruhrstadion; Attendance: 27,600; Referee: Christof Günsch |

=== DFB-Pokal ===
| 19 August 2016 First Round | VfB Lübeck | 0–3 | FC St. Pauli | Lübeck |
| 20:45 | | Report | Hedenstad 16'; Gonther 61'; Ducksch 88' | Stadium: Stadion an der Lohmühle; Attendance: 13,000; Referee: Martin Thomsen |

| 25 October 2016 Second Round | FC St. Pauli | 0–2 | Hertha BSC | Hamburg |
| 20:45 | | Report | Weiser 42'; Stocker 54' | Stadium: Millerntor-Stadion; Attendance: 29,123; Referee: Deniz Aytekin |

== Statistics ==
=== Squad and statistics ===
As of 21 May 2017

| No. | Pos | Nat | Player | Total | | 2. Bundesliga | | DFB-Pokal | |
| No. | Pos | Nat | Player | Apps | Goals | Apps | Goals | Apps | Goals |
|---|---|---|---|---|---|---|---|---|---|
| 1 | GK | (Germany) GER | Philipp Heerwagen | 21 | 0 | 19+1 | 0 | 1 | 0 |
| 30 | GK | (Germany) GER | Robin Himmelmann | 16 | 0 | 15 | 0 | 1 | 0 |
| 33 | GK | (Germany) GER | Svend Brodersen | 0 | 0 | 0 | 0 | 0 | 0 |
| 2 | DF | (Norway) NOR | Vegar Eggen Hedenstad | 16 | 1 | 14+1 | 0 | 1 | 1 |
| 3 | DF | (Germany) GER | Lasse Sobiech | 29 | 4 | 28+1 | 4 | 0 | 0 |
| 4 | DF | (Germany) GER | Philipp Ziereis | 16 | 1 | 12+3 | 1 | 1 | 0 |
| 5 | DF | (Switzerland) SUI | Joël Keller | 5 | 0 | 4+1 | 0 | 0 | 0 |
| 15 | DF | (Germany) GER | Daniel Buballa | 31 | 0 | 24+6 | 0 | 1 | 0 |
| 16 | DF | (Germany) GER | Marc Hornschuh | 23 | 0 | 21+1 | 0 | 1 | 0 |
| 19 | DF | (Denmark) DEN | Jacob Rasmussen | 0 | 0 | 0 | 0 | 0 | 0 |
| 26 | DF | (Germany) GER | Sören Gonther | 23 | 1 | 17+5 | 0 | 1 | 1 |
| 27 | DF | (Germany) GER | Jan-Philipp Kalla | 13 | 0 | 6+7 | 0 | 0 | 0 |
| 35 | DF | (Germany) GER | Brian Koglin | 3 | 0 | 2 | 0 | 1 | 0 |
| 6 | MF | (Germany) GER | Christopher Avevor | 9 | 0 | 5+2 | 0 | 2 | 0 |
| 7 | MF | (Germany) GER | Bernd Nehrig | 31 | 1 | 29+1 | 1 | 1 | 0 |
| 8 | MF | (Germany) GER | Jeremy Dudziak | 21 | 0 | 17+3 | 0 | 1 | 0 |
| 10 | MF | (Germany) GER | Christopher Buchtmann | 32 | 6 | 27+3 | 6 | 2 | 0 |
| 13 | MF | (Japan) JPN | Ryo Miyaichi | 19 | 0 | 8+9 | 0 | 1+1 | 0 |
| 14 | MF | (Norway) NOR | Mats Møller Dæhli | 13 | 2 | 13 | 2 | 0 | 0 |
| 20 | MF | (Germany) GER | Richard Neudecker | 8 | 0 | 3+5 | 0 | 0 | 0 |
| 22 | MF | (Turkey) TUR | Cenk Şahin | 29 | 4 | 19+8 | 4 | 0+2 | 0 |
| 23 | MF | (Germany) GER | Johannes Flum | 11 | 0 | 6+5 | 0 | 0 | 0 |
| 25 | MF | (Germany) GER | Dennis Rosin | 3 | 0 | 1+2 | 0 | 0 | 0 |
| 28 | MF | (Poland) POL | Waldemar Sobota | 33 | 1 | 31 | 1 | 2 | 0 |
| 29 | MF | (Germany) GER | Jan-Marc Schneider | 3 | 0 | 0+3 | 0 | 0 | 0 |
| 31 | MF | (Germany) GER | Maurice Litka | 7 | 0 | 2+4 | 0 | 1 | 0 |
| 37 | MF | (South Korea) KOR | Choi Kyoung-rok | 18 | 1 | 12+4 | 1 | 2 | 0 |
| 39 | MF | (South Korea) KOR | Park Yi-young | 2 | 0 | 2 | 0 | 0 | 0 |
| 9 | FW | (Haiti) HAI | Fafà Picault | 8 | 0 | 3+3 | 0 | 1+1 | 0 |
| 11 | FW | (Germany) GER | Aziz Bouhaddouz | 29 | 15 | 26+2 | 15 | 1 | 0 |
| 18 | FW | (Germany) GER | Lennart Thy | 15 | 2 | 4+11 | 2 | 0 | 0 |
| 24 | FW | (Germany) GER | Nico Empen | 2 | 0 | 0+2 | 0 | 0 | 0 |
| 34 | FW | (Germany) GER | Marvin Ducksch | 12 | 2 | 4+6 | 1 | 0+2 | 1 |
