= Brian Koglin =

German footballer (born 1997)

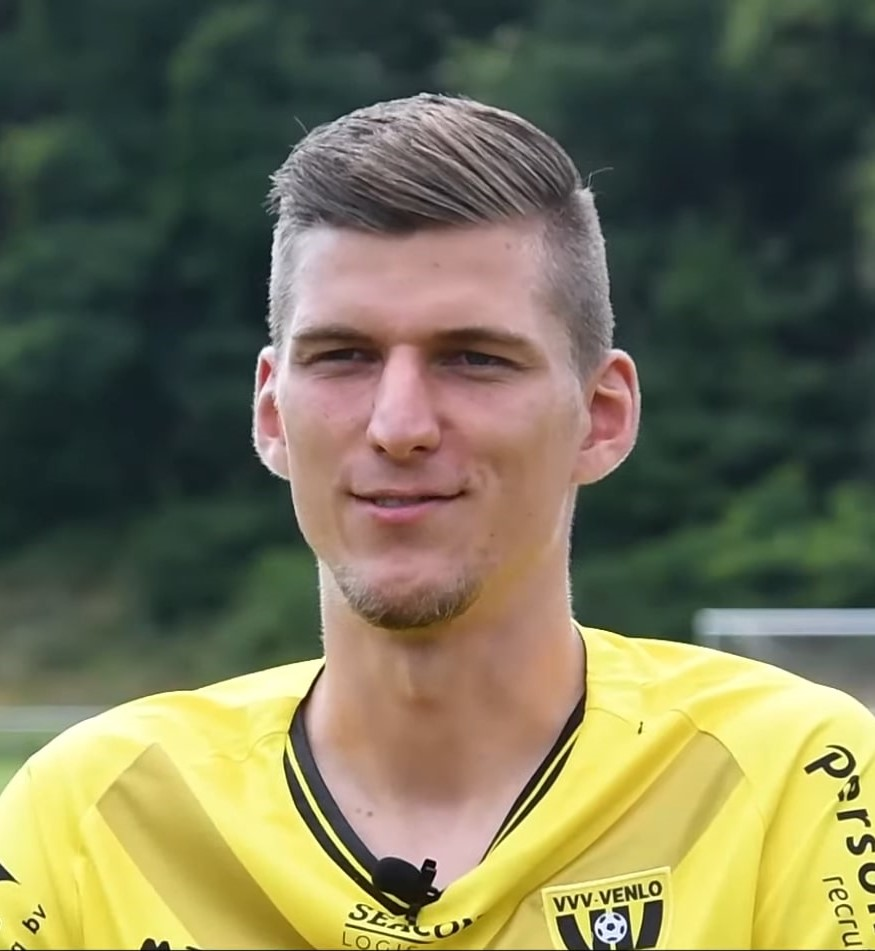
- Koglin in 2021

Personal information
- Full name: Brian Lukas Koglin
- Date of birth: 7 January 1997 (age 29)
- Place of birth: Hamburg, Germany
- Height: 1.86 m (6 ft 1 in)
- Position: Centre-back

Team information
- Current team: Helmond Sport
- Number: 4

Youth career
- TuS Bern
- –2013: Eintracht Norderstedt
- 2013–2016: FC St. Pauli

Senior career*
Years	Team	Apps	(Gls)
2015–2019	FC St. Pauli II	83	(9)
2016–2019	FC St. Pauli	6	(0)
2019–2021	1. FC Magdeburg	48	(0)
2021–2023	VVV-Venlo	69	(5)
2023–2025	Roda JC	54	(2)
2025–	Helmond Sport	32	(2)
- * Club domestic league appearances and goals as of 28 April 2026

Brian Lukas Koglin (born 7 January 1997) is a German professional footballer who plays as a centre-back for Eerste Divisie club Helmond Sport.

== Career ==
=== FC St. Pauli ===
After having progressed through the youth teams of TuS Bern, Eintracht Norderstedt and FC St. Pauli, Koglin made his professional debut in St. Pauli's 2–0 home loss to Hertha BSC in the DFB-Pokal on 25 October 2016, replacing the injured Daniel Buballa in the starting lineup at left-back. His league debut in the 2. Bundesliga followed six days later on 31 October 2016 in a 1–1 draw against 1. FC Nürnberg.

He extended his contract with St. Pauli on 2 March 2018, signing an extension until 2019.

Koglin left the club when his contract expired in June 2019, having made 83 appearances and scored nine goals in six years for the reserves in the Regionalliga, and made seven total appearances for the first team in the 2. Bundesliga and DFB-Pokal.

=== 1. FC Magdeburg ===
On 5 June 2019, Koglin signed a two-year contract with 1. FC Magdeburg, who had been recently relegated to the 3. Liga. Under manager Stefan Krämer, Koglin made his Magdeburg debut on 28 July 2019 in an away game against FSV Zwickau. By the end of the season, he had made 28 appearances in the third division and managed to stay up finishing 14th.

The following season, Magdeburg slightly improved and finished in 11th place, as Koglin made 21 total appearances. He left the club after the season, having made 48 total appearances for Magdeburg.

=== VVV-Venlo ===
On 27 June 2021, Koglin signed a two-year contract with Dutch club VVV-Venlo, who had recently been relegated to the second-tier Eerste Divisie. The move reunited him with his former manager at St. Pauli, Jos Luhukay. He made his debut for the club in VVV's season opener on 8 August 2021, also scoring his first goal for the club in a 2–2 home draw against NAC Breda.

Koglin left VVV at the end of the 2022–23 season, as his contract was not extended.

=== Roda JC ===
On 12 July 2023, Koglin signed a two-year contract with Eerste Divisie club Roda JC. He made his competitive debut for the club on the first matchday of the season, starting in a 4–1 home win over Helmond Sport on 11 August. On 14 October, he scored his first goal for De Koempels in the derby against his former club VVV, securing a 1–1 draw.

At the end of the 2024–25 season, Koglin was offered a new contract by Roda JC, but opted not to accept the offer, making him a free agent.

=== Helmond Sport ===
On 25 June 2025, Koglin signed a two-year contract with Eerste Divisie club Helmond Sport.

== Career statistics ==
As of match played 9 May 2025

Appearances and goals by club, season and competition
Club	Season	League			National cup (Note: Includes DFB-Pokal, KNVB Cup)		Other		Total	
Club	Season	Division	Apps	Goals	Apps	Goals	Apps	Goals	Apps	Goals
FC St. Pauli II	2015–16	Regionalliga Nord	6	0	—		—		6	0
FC St. Pauli II	2016–17	Regionalliga Nord	27	1	—		—		27	1
FC St. Pauli II	2017–18	Regionalliga Nord	22	2	—		—		22	2
FC St. Pauli II	2018–19	Regionalliga Nord	28	6	—		—		28	6
FC St. Pauli II	Total		83	9	—		—		83	9
FC St. Pauli	2016–17	2. Bundesliga	2	0	1	0	—		3	0
FC St. Pauli	2017–18	2. Bundesliga	2	0	0	0	—		2	0
FC St. Pauli	2018–19	2. Bundesliga	2	0	0	0	—		2	0
FC St. Pauli	Total		6	0	1	0	—		7	0
1. FC Magdeburg	2019–20	3. Liga	28	0	0	0	—		28	0
1. FC Magdeburg	2020–21	3. Liga	20	0	1	0	—		21	0
1. FC Magdeburg	Total		48	0	1	0	—		49	0
VVV-Venlo	2021–22	Eerste Divisie	35	4	1	0	—		36	4
VVV-Venlo	2022–23	Eerste Divisie	34	1	1	0	4 (Note: Appearances in Eredivisie promotion/relegation playoffs)	0	39	1
VVV-Venlo	Total		69	5	2	0	4	0	75	5
Roda JC	2023–24	Eerste Divisie	25	1	1	0	2	1	28	2
Roda JC	2024–25	Eerste Divisie	29	1	1	0	—		30	1
Roda JC	Total		54	2	2	0	2	1	58	3
Helmond Sport	2025–26	Eerste Divisie	0	0	0	0	—		0	0
Career total			260	16	6	0	6	1	272	17
