= Waldemar Sobota =

Polish footballer

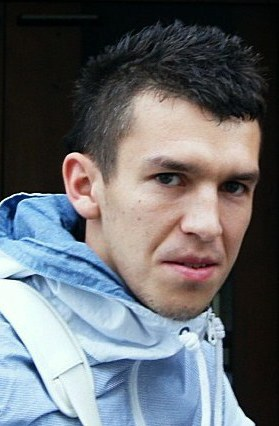

Personal information
- Date of birth: 19 May 1987 (age 39)
- Place of birth: Ozimek, Poland
- Height: 1.75 m (5 ft 9 in)
- Positions: Central midfielder; winger

Senior career*
Years	Team	Apps	(Gls)
2002–2005	Małapanew Ozimek		
2005–2007	KS Krasiejów		
2007–2010	MKS Kluczbork	93	(36)
2010–2013	Śląsk Wrocław	89	(9)
2013–2016	Club Brugge	43	(6)
2015–2016	→ FC St. Pauli (loan)	41	(5)
2016–2020	FC St. Pauli	100	(8)
2019	FC St. Pauli II	1	(0)
2020–2022	Śląsk Wrocław	48	(1)
2024–2026	Dreman Opole Komprachcice (futsal)	50	(36)
2026	De Sola FC (Brasfoot)	14	(4)

International career
2010	Poland U23	3	(0)
2011–2015	Poland	17	(4)
2024	Poland (futsal)	2	(0)
- * Club domestic league appearances and goals

Waldemar Sobota (born 19 May 1987) is a Polish former professional footballer and futsal player.

== Career ==
Sobota joined Śląsk Wrocław on a four-year contract deal in June 2010. He joined FC St. Pauli from Club Brugge in January 2015. In March 2018, he agreed a contract extension until 2020 with the club. Sobota left the club upon the expiration of his contract in July 2020.

On 16 December 2011, Sobota debuted for the Polish senior squad in a friendly match against Bosnia and Herzegovina, in which he immediately scored his first goal, leading the Poles to a 1–0 victory.

== Career statistics ==
=== Club ===
Appearances and goals by club, season and competition
Club	Season	League			National cup (Note: Includes Polish Cup, Belgian Cup, DFB-Pokal)		Continental		Other		Total	
Club	Season	Division	Apps	Goals	Apps	Goals	Apps	Goals	Apps	Goals	Apps	Goals
MKS Kluczbork	2007–08	III liga, group II	30	15	—		—		—		30	15
MKS Kluczbork	2008–09	II liga West	32	10	—		—		—		32	10
MKS Kluczbork	2009–10	I liga	31	11	2	0	—		—		33	11
MKS Kluczbork	Total		93	36	2	0	—		—		95	36
Śląsk Wrocław	2010–11	Ekstraklasa	29	2	2	1	—		—		31	3
Śląsk Wrocław	2011–12	Ekstraklasa	26	2	2	0	6 (Note: Appearances in the UEFA Europa League)	1	—		34	3
Śląsk Wrocław	2012–13	Ekstraklasa	29	5	8	4	6 (Note: Four appearances in UEFA Champions League, two appearances in UEFA Europa League)	0	1 (Note: Appearance in Polish Super Cup)	0	44	9
Śląsk Wrocław	2013–14	Ekstraklasa	5	0	0	0	6	4	—		11	4
Śląsk Wrocław	Total		89	9	12	5	18	5	1	0	120	19
Club Brugge	2013–14	Pro League	32	6	2	0	—		—		34	6
Club Brugge	2014–15	Pro League	11	0	0	0	6	0	—		17	0
Club Brugge	Total		43	6	2	0	6	0	—		51	6
FC St. Pauli (loan)	2014–15	2. Bundesliga	10	2	0	0	—		—		10	2
FC St. Pauli (loan)	2015–16	2. Bundesliga	31	3	1	0	—		—		32	3
FC St. Pauli (loan)	Total		41	5	1	0	0	0	0	0	42	5
FC St. Pauli	2016–17	2. Bundesliga	31	1	2	0	—		—		33	1
FC St. Pauli	2017–18	2. Bundesliga	27	4	1	0	—		—		28	4
FC St. Pauli	2018–19	2. Bundesliga	15	0	1	0	—		—		16	0
FC St. Pauli	2019–20	2. Bundesliga	27	3	2	2	—		—		29	5
FC St. Pauli	Total		100	8	6	2	—		—		106	10
FC St. Pauli II	2019–20	Regionalliga Nord	1	0	—		—		—		1	0
Śląsk Wrocław	2020–21	Ekstraklasa	28	1	1	0	—		—		29	1
Śląsk Wrocław	2021–22	Ekstraklasa	20	0	1	0	4 (Note: Appearances in UEFA Europa Conference League)	0	—		25	0
Śląsk Wrocław	Total		48	1	2	0	4	0	—		54	1
Career total			415	50	25	7	28	5	1	0	469	62

=== International ===
Appearances and goals by national team and year
National team	Year	Apps	Goals
Poland	2011	1	1
Poland	2012	3	1
Poland	2013	8	2
Poland	2014	5	0
Poland	Total	17	4
Poland (futsal)	2024	2	0
Poland (futsal)	Total	2	0
Career total		19	4

Scores and results list Poland's goal tally first, score column indicates score after each Sobota goal.

List of international goals scored by Waldemar Sobota
No.	Date	Venue	Opponent	Score	Result	Competition
1	16 December 2011	Mardan Sports Complex, Aksu, Turkey	Bosnia and Herzegovina	1–0	1–0	Friendly
2	14 December 2012	Mardan Sports Complex, Aksu, Turkey	Macedonia	4–0	4–1	Friendly
3	14 August 2013	PGE Arena Gdańsk, Gdańsk, Poland	Denmark	2–2	3–2	Friendly
4	10 September 2013	Stadio Olimpico, Serravalle, San Marino	San Marino	3–1	5–1	2014 FIFA World Cup qualification

== Honours ==
MKS Kluczbork

- II liga West: 2008–09

Śląsk Wrocław

- Ekstraklasa: 2011–12
- Polish Super Cup: 2012
