= Jeremy Dudziak =

Footballer (born 1995)

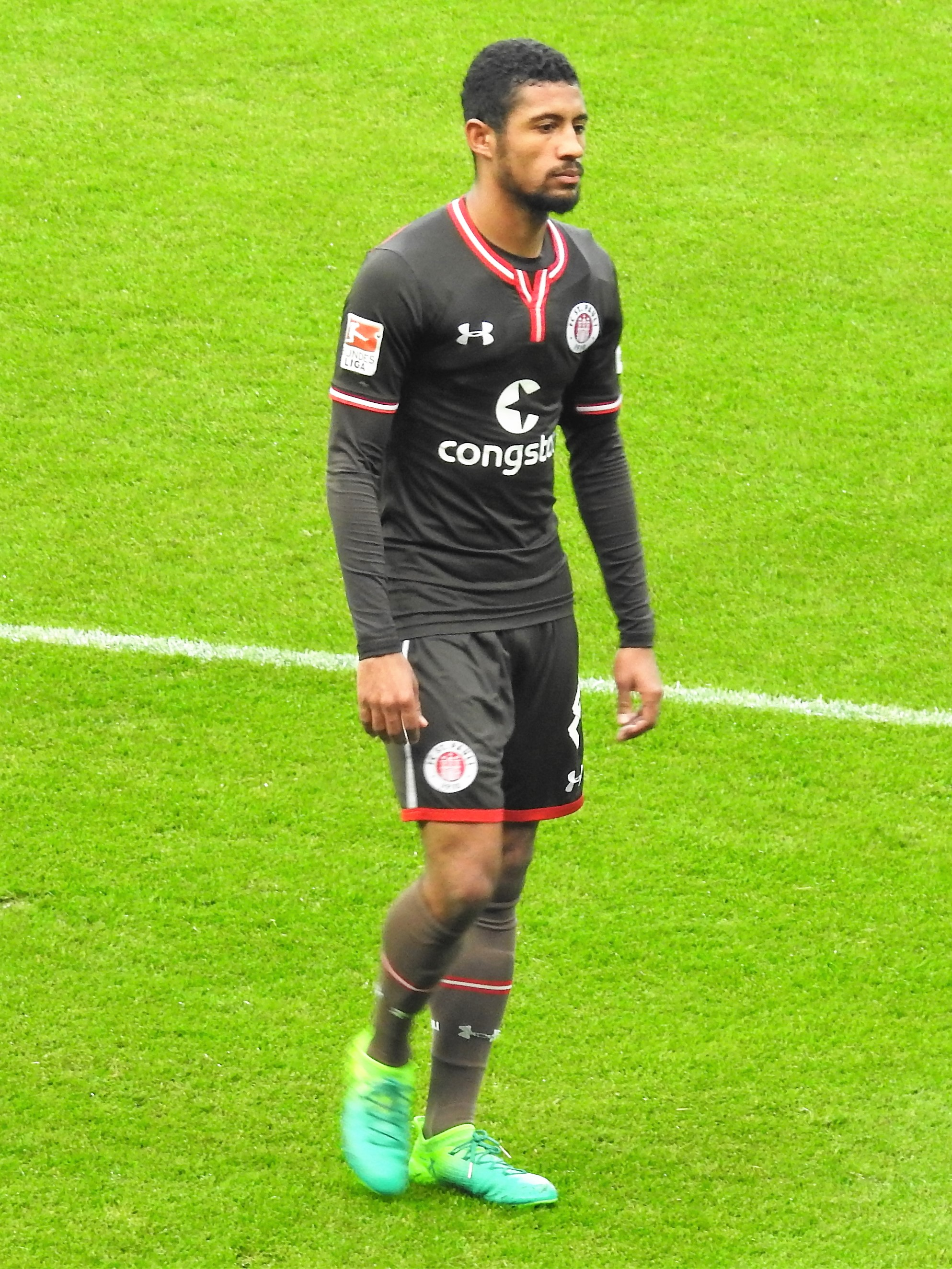
- Dudziak playing for FC St. Pauli in 2017

Personal information
- Date of birth: 28 August 1995 (age 31)
- Place of birth: Hamburg, Germany
- Height: 1.76 m (5 ft 9 in)
- Position: Midfielder

Team information
- Current team: Beijing Guoan
- Number: 28

Youth career
- –2007: JSG Warmetal
- 2007–2009: Schalke 04
- 2009–2014: Borussia Dortmund

Senior career*
Years	Team	Apps	(Gls)
2012–2015	Borussia Dortmund II	28	(0)
2015	Borussia Dortmund	3	(0)
2015–2019	FC St. Pauli	91	(3)
2019–2021	Hamburger SV	55	(5)
2021–2023	Greuther Fürth	32	(2)
2023	→ Hatayspor (loan)	3	(0)
2023–2025	Hertha BSC	16	(1)
2025–2026	Hertha BSC	10	(1)
2025–2026	Hertha BSC II	4	(1)
2026–	Beijing Guoan	0	(0)

International career^{‡}
2011–2012	Germany U17	18	(2)
2013–2014	Germany U19	7	(1)
2015–2016	Germany U20	5	(0)
2016	Germany U21	1	(0)
2019	Tunisia	1	(0)
Medal record
European U19 Championship
Winner	2014 Hungary
- * Club domestic league appearances and goals as of 18 May 2026 ‡ National team caps and goals as of 3 September 2016

Jeremy Dudziak (born 28 August 1995) is a professional footballer who plays as a midfielder for Chinese Super League club Beijing Guoan. A former youth international for Germany, Dudziak has represented the Tunisia national team.

== Club career ==
Dudziak attended MSV Duisburg's youth academy and later, as a 16-year-old, joined Borussia Dortmund's academy. He made his debut for Borussia Dortmund II against Karlsruher SC on 16 February 2013, coming as an 86th-minute substitute for Mustafa Amini. In the 2013–14 U19 Bundesliga, he played eight times, scoring six goals. This included two braces against Schalke 04 U19, VfL Theesen U19 beside two more goals against the under-19 sides of 1. FC Köln and Wuppertaler SV. With the reserves in the 3. Liga, Dudziak played 12 times in the same season.

On 13 January 2015, Dudziak played a friendly match for Borussia Dortmund against Swiss side FC Sion, where he started the match, being substituted for Tammo Harder in the sixty-first minute. He also played four more friendlies for the club against Dutch club FC Utrecht, twice against Fortuna Düsseldorf, and Hessen Kassel.

On 27 January, Dudziak signed a professional contract with Borussia Dortmund up until 30 June 2018. On 4 March, he was an unused substitute in a DFB-Pokal match against Dynamo Dresden. He made his debut in a 3–2 away win against Hannover 96 on 21 March 2015, coming on as a 58th-minute substitute for Oliver Kirch.

On 28 August, Dudziak signed a three-year contract with FC St. Pauli.

In January 2023, he joined Hatayspor on loan until the end of the season from Greuther Fürth.

On 30 June 2023, Dudziak signed for recently relegated 2. Bundesliga club Hertha BSC on a one-year deal.

On 8 October 2025, he returned to Hertha BSC to play for their second-team.

On 22 July 2026, Dudziak joined Chinese Super League club Beijing Guoan.

== International career ==
Dudziak was born in Germany to a Ghanaian father who was raised in Tunisia and a German mother; thus qualified to play for Ghana, Tunisia and Germany. Dudziak made his debut for Germany under-16 against Russia U16. He won the 2014 UEFA European Under-19 Championship with the Germany under-19 team.

Dudziak debuted for the Tunisia national team in a 1–0 friendly win over Mauritania on 6 September 2019.

== Career statistics ==
=== Club ===
As of match played 15 September 2026

Appearances and goals by club, season and competition
Club	Season	League			DFB Pokal		Europe		Other		Total	
Club	Season	Division	Apps	Goals	Apps	Goals	Apps	Goals	Apps	Goals	Apps	Goals
Borussia Dortmund II	2012–13	3. Liga	4	1	—		—		—		4	1
Borussia Dortmund II	2013–14	3. Liga	12	0	—		—		—		12	0
Borussia Dortmund II	2014–15	3. Liga	14	0	—		—		—		14	0
Borussia Dortmund II	2015–16	Regionalliga West	1	0	—		—		—		1	0
Borussia Dortmund II	Total		31	1	—		—		—		31	1
Borussia Dortmund	2014–15	Bundesliga	3	0	0	0	0	0	0	0	3	0
St. Pauli	2015–16	2. Bundesliga	21	1	0	0	—		—		21	1
St. Pauli	2016–17	2. Bundesliga	20	0	1	0	—		—		21	0
St. Pauli	2017–18	2. Bundesliga	26	1	1	0	—		—		27	1
St. Pauli	2018–19	2. Bundesliga	24	2	1	0	—		—		25	2
St. Pauli	Total		91	4	3	0	—		—		94	4
Hamburger SV	2019–20	2. Bundesliga	28	3	2	0	—		—		30	3
Hamburger SV	2020–21	2. Bundesliga	27	2	1	0	—		—		28	2
Hamburger SV	Total		55	5	3	0	—		—		58	5
Greuther Fürth	2021–22	2. Bundesliga	22	2	0	0	—		—		22	2
Greuther Fürth	2022–23	2. Bundesliga	10	0	1	0	—		—		11	0
Greuther Fürth	Total		32	2	1	0	—		—		33	2
Hatayspor (loan)	2022–23	Süper Lig	3	0	—		—		—		3	0
Hertha BSC	2023–24	2. Bundesliga	14	1	1	0	—		—		15	1
Hertha BSC	2024–25	2. Bundesliga	2	0	0	0	—		—		2	0
Hertha BSC	2025–26	2. Bundesliga	10	1	1	0	—		—		11	1
Hertha BSC	Total		26	2	2	0	—		—		28	2
Hertha BSC II	2025–26	Regionalliga Nordost	4	1	—		—		—		4	1
Beijing Guoan	2026	Chinese Super League	—		—		1 (Note: Appearance(s) in AFC Champions League Elite)	1	—		1	1
Career total			245	15	9	0	1	1	0	0	255	16

== Honours ==
Germany U19

- UEFA European Under-19 Championship: 2014
