= Lasse Sobiech =

German footballer

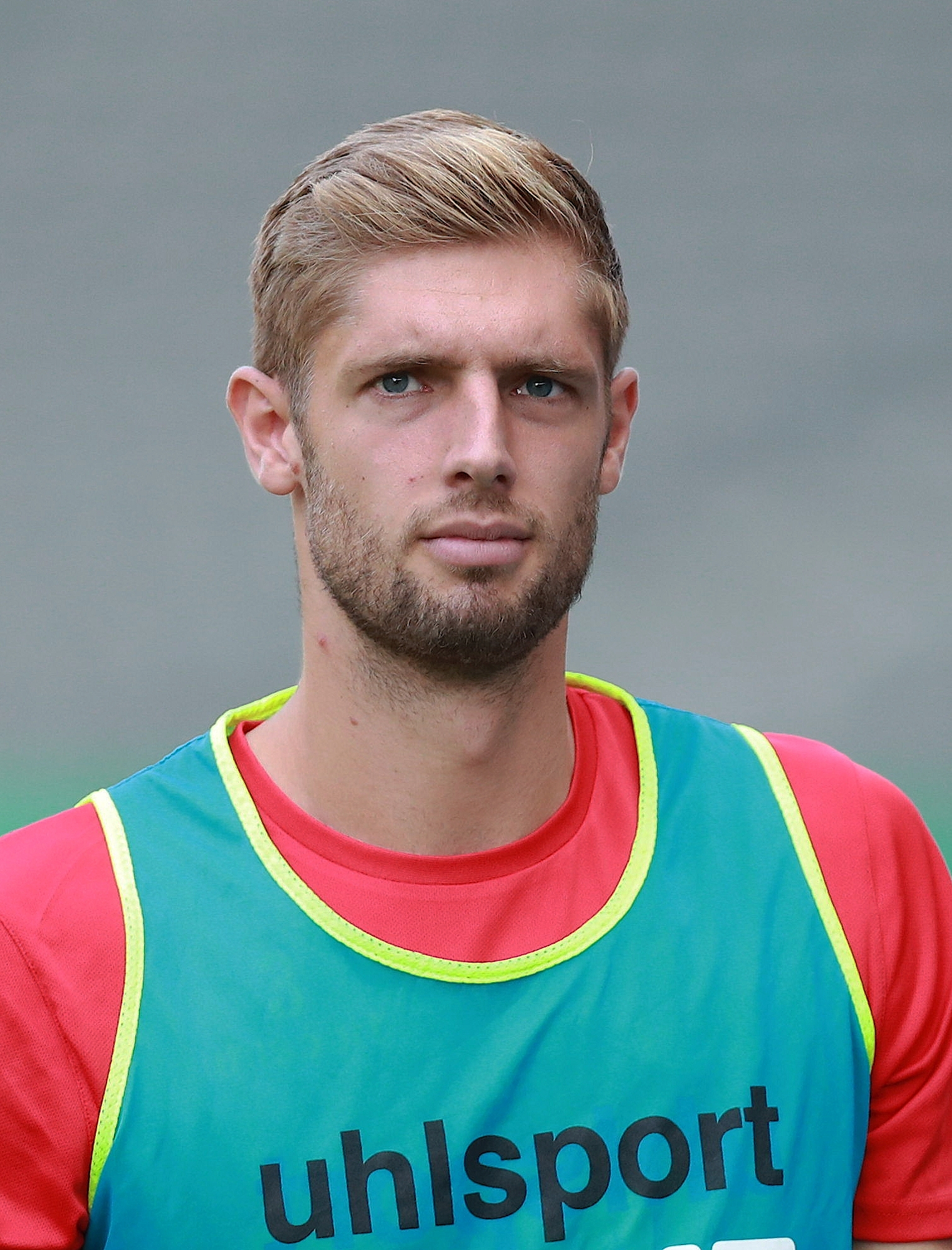
- Sobiech in 2018

Personal information
- Date of birth: 18 January 1991 (age 35)
- Place of birth: Schwerte, Germany
- Height: 1.96 m (6 ft 5 in)
- Position: Centre back

Team information
- Current team: Stellenbosch

Youth career
- 1996–2003: VfL Schwerte
- 2003–2009: Borussia Dortmund

Senior career*
Years	Team	Apps	(Gls)
2010–2013	Borussia Dortmund	0	(0)
2011–2012	→ FC St. Pauli (loan)	13	(1)
2012–2013	→ Greuther Fürth (loan)	24	(2)
2013–2015	Hamburger SV	10	(1)
2014–2015	→ FC St. Pauli (loan)	31	(4)
2015–2018	FC St. Pauli	87	(11)
2018–2021	1. FC Köln	18	(0)
2020	→ Mouscron (loan)	6	(1)
2020–2021	→ FC Zürich (loan)	12	(3)
2021–2022	Darmstadt 98	15	(0)
2022–	Stellenbosch	0	(0)

International career
2009	Germany U18	3	(0)
2009–2010	Germany U19	8	(1)
2010–2013	Germany U21	16	(2)
- * Club domestic league appearances and goals as of 15 May 2022

Lasse Sobiech (born 18 January 1991) is a German professional footballer who plays as a central defender for South African club Stellenbosch.

== Club career ==
In March 2018, it was reported Sobiech would join 1. FC Köln from FC St. Pauli for the next season having agreed a three-year contract. In January 2020, Sobiech was loaned to Royal Excel Mouscron for the remainder of the season.

On 4 September 2020, it was announced that Sobiech would join Swiss side FC Zürich on a one-year loan deal. In July 2021, after the end of his loan deal, the club announced that Sobiech's contract had been terminated and that he would join SV Darmstadt 98.

On 6 July 2022, Sobiech joined Stellenbosch in South Africa.

== International career ==
Sobiech was born in Germany, his family origins from Silesia and Poland. He is a youth international for Germany at various levels.

== Career statistics ==
As of match played 4 April 2020

Appearances and goals by club, season and competition
Club	Season	League			DFB Pokal		Other		Total	
Club	Season	Division	Apps	Goals	Apps	Goals	Apps	Goals	Apps	Goals
Borussia Dortmund II	2009–10	3. Liga	32	1	0	0	0	0	32	1
Borussia Dortmund II	2010–11	Regionalliga West	23	0	0	0	0	0	23	0
Borussia Dortmund II	Total		55	1	0	0	0	0	55	1
FC St. Pauli (loan)	2011–12	2. Bundesliga	13	1	1	0	0	0	14	1
FC St. Pauli II (loan)	2011–12	Regionalliga Nord	2	0	0	0	0	0	2	0
Greuther Fürth (loan)	2012–13	Bundesliga	24	2	0	0	0	0	24	2
Hamburger SV	2013–14	Bundesliga	10	1	2	0	0	0	12	1
Hamburger SV II	2013–14	Regionalliga Nord	3	1	0	0	0	0	3	1
FC St. Pauli (loan)	2014–15	2. Bundesliga	31	4	1	0	0	0	32	4
FC St. Pauli	2015–16	2. Bundesliga	32	4	0	0	0	0	32	4
FC St. Pauli	2016–17	2. Bundesliga	29	4	0	0	0	0	29	4
FC St. Pauli	2017–18	2. Bundesliga	26	3	1	0	0	0	27	3
FC St. Pauli	Total		87	11	1	0	0	0	88	11
1. FC Köln	2018–19	2. Bundesliga	17	0	0	0	0	0	17	0
1. FC Köln	2019–20	Bundesliga	1	0	0	0	0	0	1	0
1. FC Köln	Total		18	0	0	0	0	0	18	0
Mouscron (loan)	2019–20	Belgian First Division A	6	1	0	0	0	0	6	1
Career total			249	22	5	0	0	0	254	22
