= Johannes Flum =

German footballer

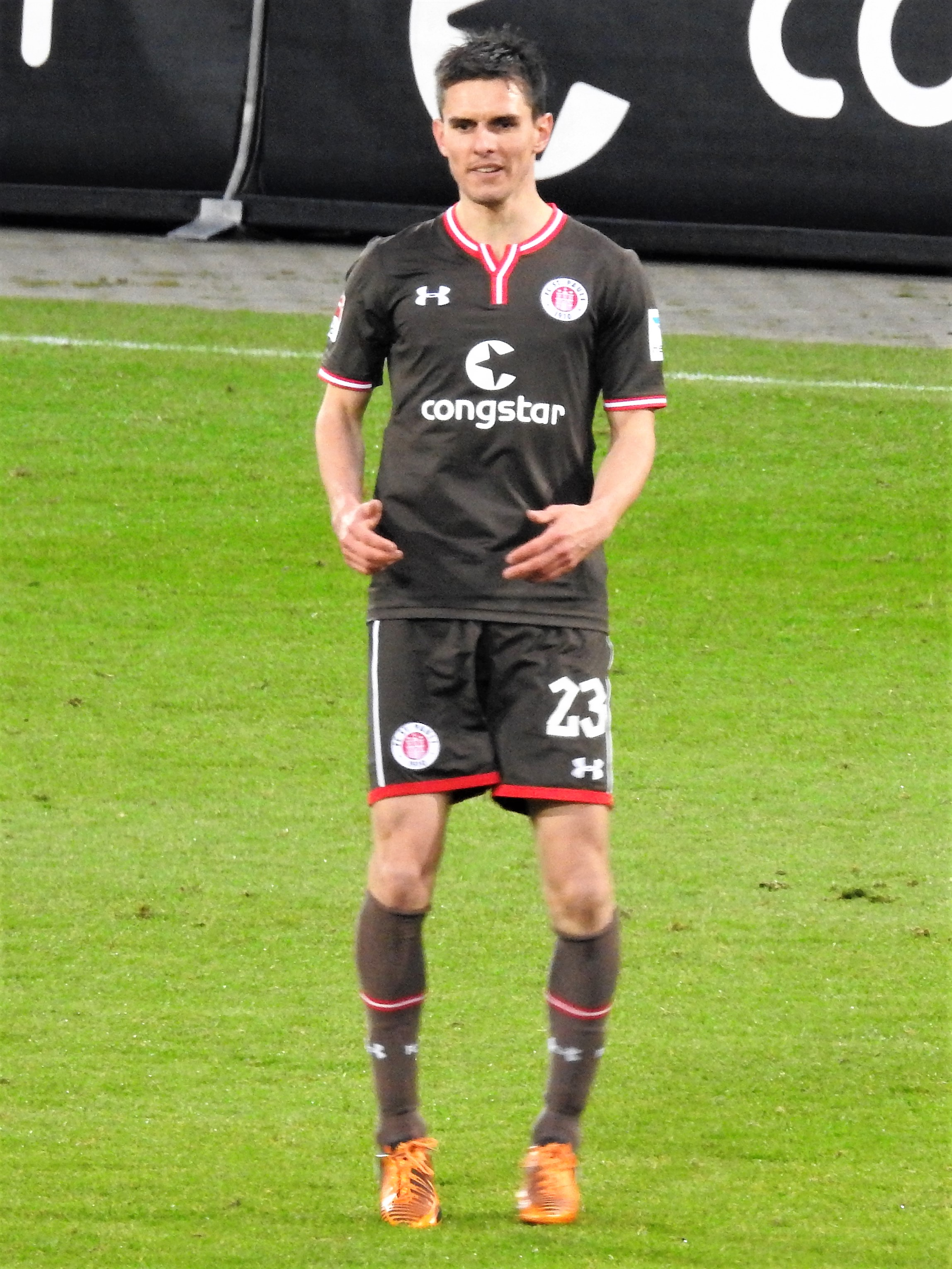
- Flum playing for FC St. Pauli in 2017

Personal information
- Date of birth: 14 December 1987 (age 38)
- Place of birth: Waldshut, West Germany
- Height: 1.90 m (6 ft 3 in)
- Position: Midfielder

Youth career
- 1992–2000: FC Rot-Weiß Weilheim
- 2000–2001: SV 08 Laufenburg
- 2001–2006: SC Freiburg

Senior career*
Years	Team	Apps	(Gls)
2006–2008	SC Pfullendorf	49	(2)
2008–2013	SC Freiburg	123	(7)
2009–2012	SC Freiburg II	4	(1)
2013–2017	Eintracht Frankfurt	38	(3)
2017–2020	FC St. Pauli	78	(5)
2019	FC St. Pauli II	1	(0)
2020–2022	SC Freiburg II	52	(4)
Total		345	(22)

International career
2008–2009	Germany U20	2	(0)
- * Club domestic league appearances and goals

Johannes Flum (born 14 December 1987) is a German former professional footballer who played as a midfielder.

== Career ==
On 22 January 2011, Flum scored SC Freiburg's 500th goal in the Bundesliga.

Flum left FC St. Pauli upon the expiration of his contract in July 2020. After the club had signed new manager Timo Schultz, the club announced it would not offer Flum a new contract.

In August 2020 Flum returned to former club SC Freiburg to play for the club's reserves, thereby rejecting an offer from FC St. Pauli's local rivals Hamburger SV.

== Career statistics ==
Appearances and goals by club, season and competition
Club	Season	League			Cup (Note: Includes German Cup.)		Continental (Note: Includes UEFA Europa League.)		Total		Ref.
Club	Season	League	Apps	Goals	Apps	Goals	Apps	Goals	Apps	Goals	Ref.
SC Pfullendorf	2006–07	Regionalliga Süd	16	0	—		—		16	0	
SC Pfullendorf	2007–08	Regionalliga Süd	33	2	—		—		33	2	
SC Pfullendorf	Total		49	2	0	0	0	0	49	2	—
SC Freiburg	2008–09	2. Bundesliga	30	0	3	0	—		33	0	
SC Freiburg	2009–10	Bundesliga	25	1	1	0	—		26	1	
SC Freiburg	2010–11	Bundesliga	12	2	0	0	—		12	2	
SC Freiburg	2011–12	Bundesliga	30	3	0	0	—		30	3	
SC Freiburg	2012–13	Bundesliga	26	1	3	1	—		29	2	
SC Freiburg	Total		123	7	7	1	0	0	130	8	—
SC Freiburg II	2009–10	Regionalliga Südwest	1	0	—		—		1	0	
SC Freiburg II	2010–11	Regionalliga Südwest	2	1	—		—		2	1	
SC Freiburg II	2012–13	Regionalliga Südwest	1	0	—		—		1	0	
SC Freiburg II	Total		4	1	0	0	0	0	4	1	—
Eintracht Frankfurt	2013–14	Bundesliga	26	3	4	0	10	0	40	3	
Eintracht Frankfurt	2014–15	Bundesliga	7	0	1	0	—		8	0	
Eintracht Frankfurt	2015–16	Bundesliga	5	0	1	0	—		6	0	
Eintracht Frankfurt	Total		38	3	6	0	10	0	54	3	—
FC St. Pauli	2016–17	2. Bundesliga	11	0	0	0	—		11	0	
FC St. Pauli	2017–18	2. Bundesliga	30	4	0	0	—		30	4	
FC St. Pauli	2018–19	2. Bundesliga	21	1	1	0	—		22	1	
FC St. Pauli	2019–20	2. Bundesliga	16	0	1	0	—		17	0	
FC St. Pauli	Total		78	5	2	0	0	0	80	5	—
FC St. Pauli II	2019–20	Regionalliga Nord	1	0	—		—		1	0	
SC Freiburg II	2020–21	Regionalliga Südwest	36	3	—		—		36	3	
SC Freiburg II	2021–22	3. Liga	16	1	—		—		16	1	
SC Freiburg II	Total		52	4	0	0	0	0	52	4	—
Career total			345	22	15	1	10	0	370	23	—
