= Choi Kyoung-rok =

South Korean footballer (born 1995)

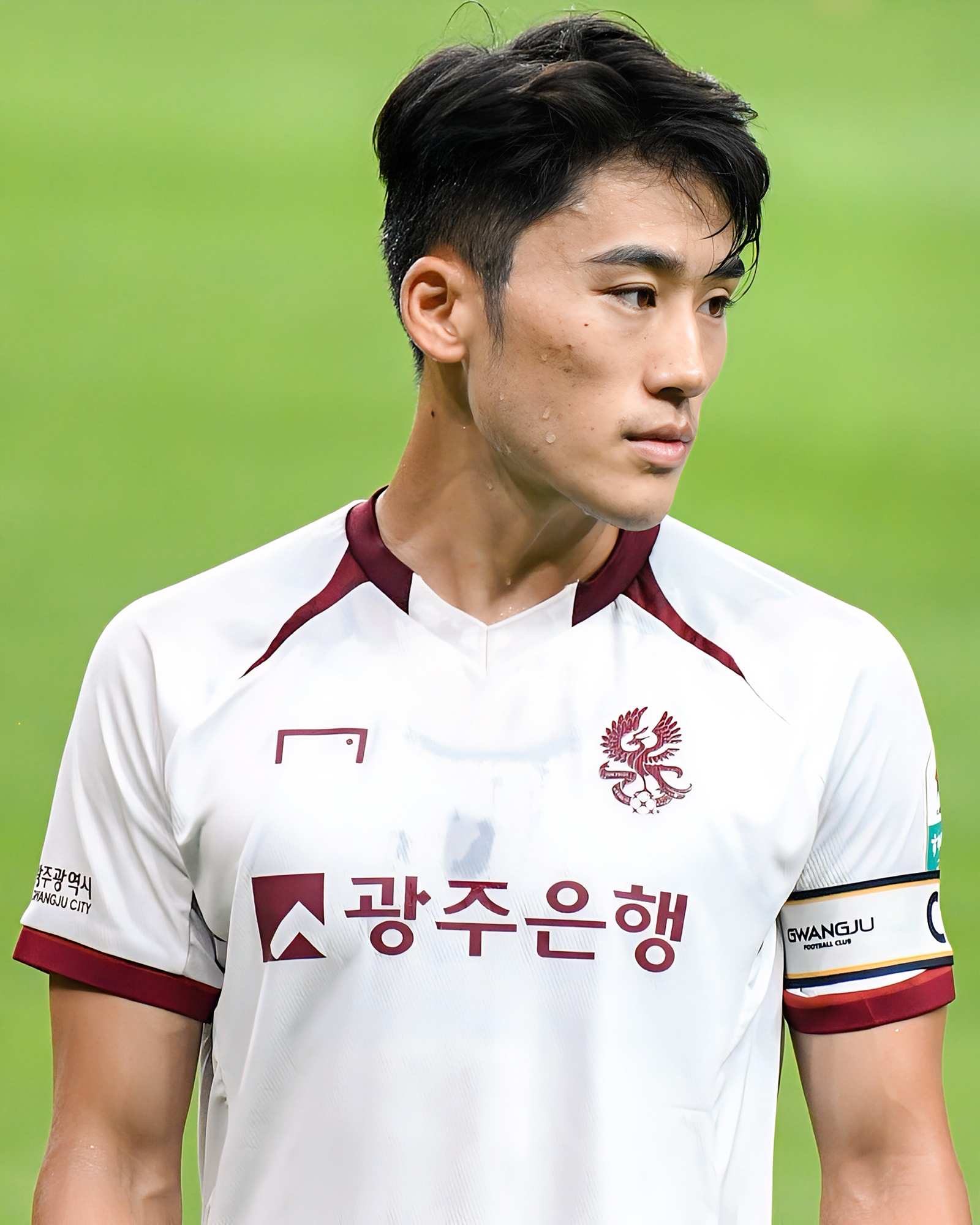
- Choi with Gwangju FC in 2025

Personal information
- Full name: Darren Choi Kyoung-rok
- Date of birth: 15 March 1995 (age 31)
- Place of birth: Seoul, South Korea
- Height: 1.76 m (5 ft 9 in)
- Position: Attacking midfielder

Team information
- Current team: Gwangju FC
- Number: 10

Youth career
- –2014: Ajou University
- 2014: FC St. Pauli

Senior career*
Years	Team	Apps	(Gls)
2014–2018	FC St. Pauli II	41	(10)
2015–2018	FC St. Pauli	42	(4)
2018−2023	Karlsruher SC	87	(11)
2024–	Gwangju FC	74	(5)

International career
2015–2016	South Korea U23	11	(0)
Korean name
Hangul	최경록
RR	Choe Gyeongrok
MR	Ch'oe Kyŏngnok
- * Club domestic league appearances and goals as of 4 August 2026

Darren Choi Kyoung-rok (Korean: 최경록; born 15 March 1995) is a South Korean professional footballer who plays as an attacking midfielder for Gwangju FC.

== Club career ==
Previously having played football for the Ajou University team, Choi moved to Germany and joined FC St. Pauli in 2014. While still playing for the club's under-19 team, in January 2014, he extended his expiring contract until 2015 including a one-year extension option. From this moment on, he also participated in the first team's training.

Choi made his 2. Bundesliga debut for St. Pauli's first team on 6 April 2015 in a match against Fortuna Düsseldorf, scoring a brace within the first 16 minutes of the game.

In May 2018, Karlsruher SC, newly relegated to the 3. Liga, announced Choi would join for the 2018–19 season having agreed a three-year contract until 2021.

In January 2024, Choi joined K League 1 club Gwangju FC.

== Career statistics ==
=== Club ===
As of 4 August 2026

Appearances and goals by club, season and competition
Club	Season	League			DFB Pokal, Korean Cup		Other		Total	
Club	Season	Division	Apps	Goals	Apps	Goals	Apps	Goals	Apps	Goals
FC St. Pauli II	2014–15	Regionalliga Nord	22	5	–		–		22	5
FC St. Pauli II	2015–16	Regionalliga Nord	2	1	–		–		2	1
FC St. Pauli II	2016–17	Regionalliga Nord	3	0	–		–		3	0
FC St. Pauli II	2017–18	Regionalliga Nord	14	4	–		–		3	0
FC St. Pauli II	Total		41	10	0	0	0	0	41	10
FC St. Pauli	2014–15	2. Bundesliga	3	2	0	0	–		3	2
FC St. Pauli	2015–16	2. Bundesliga	21	1	1	0	–		22	1
FC St. Pauli	2016–17	2. Bundesliga	16	1	2	0	–		18	1
FC St. Pauli	2017–18	2. Bundesliga	2	0	0	0	–		2	0
FC St. Pauli	Total		42	4	3	0	0	0	45	4
Karlsruher SC	2018−19	3. Liga	21	0	1	0	5	4	27	4
Karlsruher SC	2019−20	2. Bundesliga	7	1	1	0	–		8	1
Karlsruher SC	2020–21	2. Bundesliga	24	5	0	0	–		24	5
Karlsruher SC	2021–22	2. Bundesliga	24	5	3	1	–		27	6
Karlsruher SC	2022–23	2. Bundesliga	11	0	1	0	–		12	0
Karlsruher SC	Total		87	11	5	1	5	4	98	16
Gwangju FC	2024	K League 1	34	3	0	0	6 (Note: Appearances in AFC Champions League Elite)	0	40	3
Gwangju FC	2025	K League 1	32	1	4	0	2	0	38	1
Gwangju FC	2026	K League 1	8	1	1	1	0	0	9	2
Gwangju FC	Total		74	5	5	1	8	0	87	6
Career total			244	30	13	2	13	4	270	36
