= Sami Allagui =

Tunisian footballer

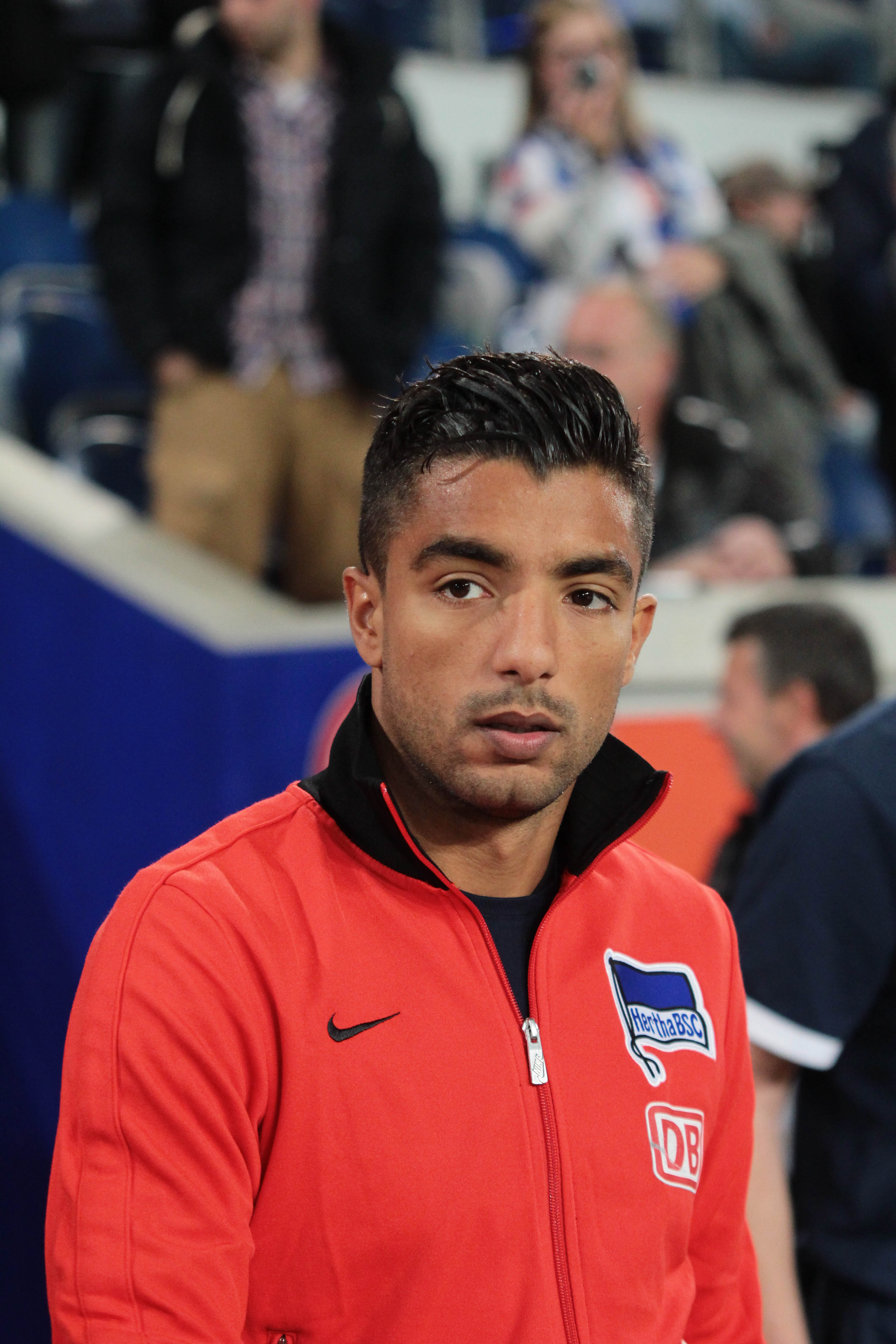
- Allagui with Hertha BSC in 2012

Personal information
- Full name: Sami Allagui
- Date of birth: 28 May 1986 (age 40)
- Place of birth: Düsseldorf, West Germany
- Height: 1.81 m (5 ft 11 in)
- Position: Forward

Youth career
- 1993–1999: FC Büderich
- 1999–2002: Fortuna Düsseldorf
- 2002–2005: Alemannia Aachen

Senior career*
Years	Team	Apps	(Gls)
2005–2007	Anderlecht	1	(0)
2007	→ Roeselare (loan)	15	(3)
2007–2008	Carl Zeiss Jena	15	(3)
2008–2010	Greuther Fürth	66	(27)
2010–2012	Mainz 05	47	(14)
2012–2017	Hertha BSC	67	(17)
2012–2017	Hertha BSC II	2	(3)
2014–2015	→ Mainz 05 (loan)	19	(2)
2017–2019	FC St. Pauli	53	(8)
2019–2020	Mouscron	12	(2)
Total		297	(79)

International career
2008–2014	Tunisia	26	(5)
- * Club domestic league appearances and goals

Sami Allagui (born 28 May 1986) is a former professional footballer who played as a striker. He spent most of his career in Germany. At international level, he played for the Tunisia national team.

== Club career ==
Allagui was awarded a three-year youth contract with R.S.C. Anderlecht in summer 2005.

On 11 May 2016, Allagui extended his contract at Hertha BSC until 2017.

Allagui joined 2. Bundesliga side FC St. Pauli when his contract with Hertha BSC expired in summer of 2017.

Allagui announced his retirement in October 2020 citing injury problems.

== International career ==
On 10 November 2008, Allagui was called up to play for the Tunisia national team and played 45 minutes. In a May 2009 friendly match against Sudan, he scored his first international goal. He scored again against Oman on 29 March 2011. On 10 August 2011, Allagui scored a double in a friendly match against Mali.

== Career statistics ==
=== Club ===
Appearances and goals by club, season and competition
Club	Season	League			National Cup		Europa League		Total	
Club	Season	Division	Apps	Goals	Apps	Goals	Apps	Goals	Apps	Goals
Anderlecht	2005–06	Belgian First Division	1	0	0	0	0	0	1	0
Roeselare (loan)	2006–07	Belgian First Division	15	3	0	0	—		15	3
Carl Zeiss Jena	2007–08	2. Bundesliga	15	3	0	0	—		15	3
Greuther Fürth	2008–09	2. Bundesliga	34	15	0	0	—		34	15
Greuther Fürth	2009–10	2. Bundesliga	32	12	4	2	—		36	14
Greuther Fürth	Total		66	27	4	2	—		70	29
Mainz 05	2010–11	Bundesliga	28	10	2	0	—		30	10
Mainz 05	2011–12	Bundesliga	19	4	2	1	2	0	23	5
Mainz 05	Total		47	14	4	1	2	0	53	15
Hertha BSC	2012–13	2. Bundesliga	25	7	1	0	—		26	7
Hertha BSC	2013–14	Bundesliga	29	9	2	1	—		31	10
Hertha BSC	2014–15	Bundesliga	1	0	0	0	—		1	0
Hertha BSC	2015–16	Bundesliga	0	0	0	0	—		0	0
Hertha BSC	2016–17	Bundesliga	12	1	1	0	1	0	14	1
Hertha BSC	Total		67	17	4	1	1	0	72	18
Mainz 05 (loan)	2014–15	Bundesliga	19	2	0	0	—		19	2
Hertha BSC II	2012–13	Regionalliga Nordost	2	3	–		—		2	3
FC St. Pauli	2017–18	2. Bundesliga	31	4	1	1	—		32	5
FC St. Pauli	2018–19	2. Bundesliga	22	4	1	0	—		23	4
FC St. Pauli	Total		53	8	2	1	0	0	55	9
Mouscron	2019–20	Belgian First Division	12	2	0	0	—		12	2
Career total			297	79	14	5	3	0	314	84
