= Robin Himmelmann =

German footballer

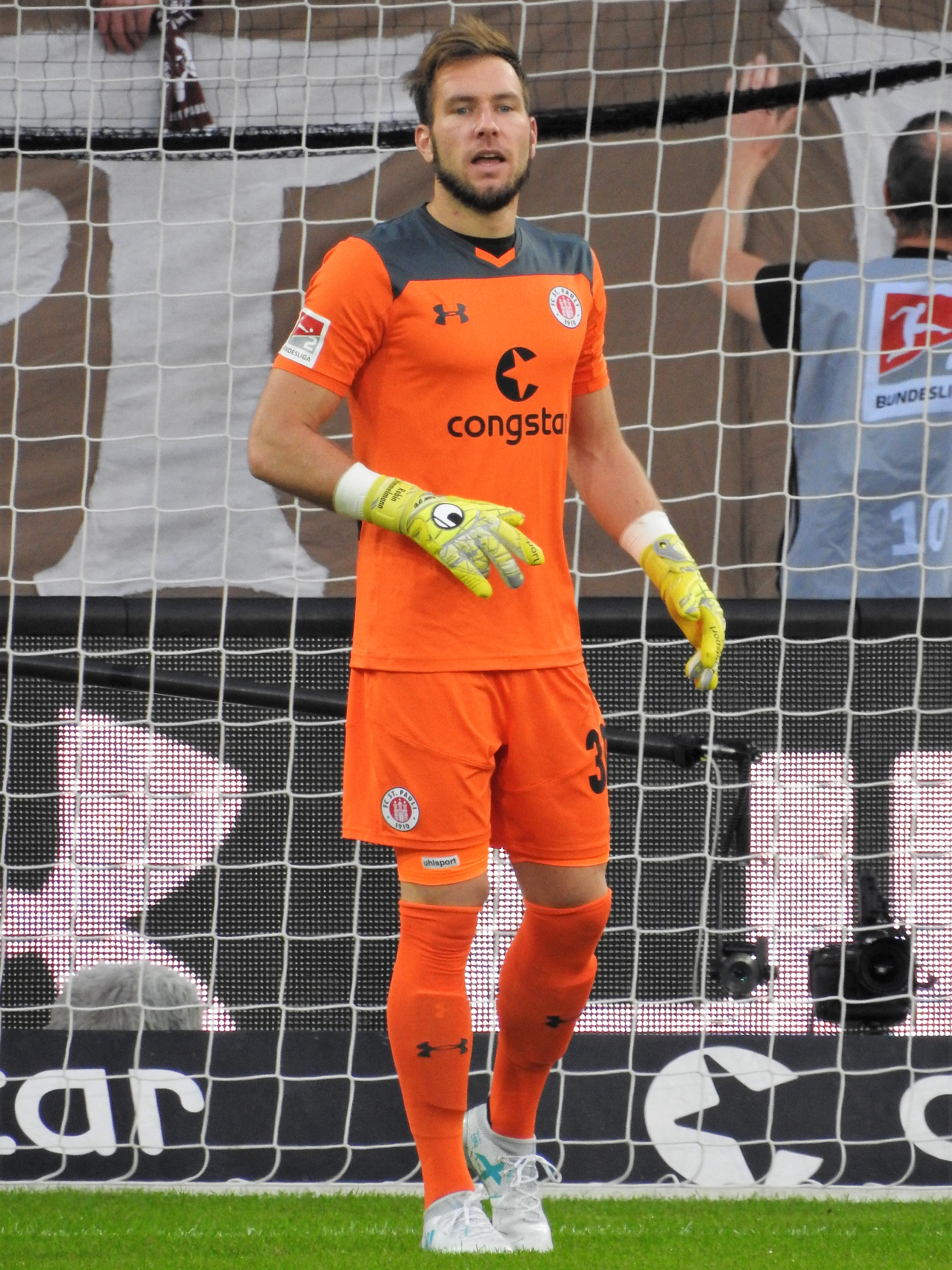
- Himmelmann with FC St. Pauli in 2017

Personal information
- Date of birth: 5 February 1989 (age 37)
- Place of birth: Moers, Germany
- Height: 1.86 m (6 ft 1 in)
- Position: Goalkeeper

Team information
- Current team: Karlsruher SC
- Number: 30

Youth career
- 1993–1999: SV Scherpenberg
- 1999–2004: TV Asberg
- 2004–2005: SV Straelen
- 2005–2006: VfL Repelen
- 2006–2007: 1. FC Union Solingen
- 2007–2008: Rot-Weiss Essen

Senior career*
| Years | Team | Apps | (Gls) |
| 2008–2010 | Rot-Weiss Essen | 18 | (0) |
| 2010–2012 | Schalke 04 II | 33 | (0) |
| 2012–2017 | FC St. Pauli II | 23 | (0) |
| 2012–2021 | FC St. Pauli | 179 | (0) |
| 2021–2022 | Eupen | 15 | (0) |
| 2023 | Holstein Kiel | 9 | (0) |
| 2024 | 1. FC Kaiserslautern | 3 | (0) |
| 2024– | Karlsruher SC | 1 | (0) |
- * Club domestic league appearances and goals as of 18 May 2026

Robin Himmelmann (born 5 February 1989) is a German professional footballer who plays as a goalkeeper for 2. Bundesliga club Karlsruher SC.

== Career ==
Himmelmann joined FC St. Pauli in 2012 from Schalke 04 II. After many years of being number one goalkeeper at the club, he lost his spot and agreed the termination with the club in January 2021.

In February 2021, Himmelmann signed a contract for the remainder of the 2020–21 season with Belgian First Division A club Eupen. After the club had initially announced in June 2021 that his contract would not be extended, he ended up signing a one-year deal with Eupen in July 2021.

In January 2023, Himmelmann joined 2. Bundesliga club Holstein Kiel on a short-term contract until the end of the season, with the option for a further year.

On 29 January 2024, Himmelmann signed with 1. FC Kaiserslautern.

On 27 June 2024, Himmelmann moved to Karlsruher SC.

== Career statistics ==
As of match played 10 November 2024

Appearances and goals by club, season and competition
| Club | Season | League | | | National cup (Note: Includes DFB-Pokal, Belgian Cup) | | Continental | | Other | | Total | |
| Club | Season | Division | Apps | Goals | Apps | Goals | Apps | Goals | Apps | Goals | Apps | Goals |
|---|---|---|---|---|---|---|---|---|---|---|---|---|
| Rot-Weiss Essen | 2008–09 | Regionalliga | 11 | 0 | — | | — | | — | | 11 | 0 |
| Rot-Weiss Essen | 2009–10 | Regionalliga | 8 | 0 | — | | — | | — | | 8 | 0 |
| Rot-Weiss Essen | Total | | 19 | 0 | — | | — | | — | | 19 | 0 |
| Schalke 04 II | 2010–11 | Regionalliga | 7 | 0 | — | | — | | — | | 7 | 0 |
| Schalke 04 II | 2011–12 | Regionalliga | 26 | 0 | — | | — | | — | | 26 | 0 |
| Schalke 04 II | Total | | 33 | 0 | — | | — | | — | | 33 | 0 |
| Schalke 04 | 2011–12 | Bundesliga | 0 | 0 | 0 | 0 | 0 | 0 | 0 | 0 | 0 | 0 |
| FC St. Pauli II | 2012–13 | Regionalliga | 11 | 0 | — | | — | | — | | 11 | 0 |
| FC St. Pauli II | 2013–14 | Regionalliga | 4 | 0 | — | | — | | — | | 4 | 0 |
| FC St. Pauli II | 2014–15 | Regionalliga | 7 | 0 | — | | — | | — | | 7 | 0 |
| FC St. Pauli II | 2016–17 | Regionalliga | 1 | 0 | — | | — | | — | | 1 | 0 |
| FC St. Pauli II | Total | | 23 | 0 | — | | — | | — | | 23 | 0 |
| FC St. Pauli | 2012–13 | 2. Bundesliga | 1 | 0 | 0 | 0 | — | | — | | 1 | 0 |
| FC St. Pauli | 2013–14 | 2. Bundesliga | 1 | 0 | 0 | 0 | — | | — | | 1 | 0 |
| FC St. Pauli | 2014–15 | 2. Bundesliga | 19 | 0 | 0 | 0 | — | | — | | 19 | 0 |
| FC St. Pauli | 2015–16 | 2. Bundesliga | 34 | 0 | 1 | 0 | — | | — | | 35 | 0 |
| FC St. Pauli | 2016–17 | 2. Bundesliga | 15 | 0 | 1 | 0 | — | | — | | 16 | 0 |
| FC St. Pauli | 2017–18 | 2. Bundesliga | 34 | 0 | 0 | 0 | — | | — | | 34 | 0 |
| FC St. Pauli | 2018–19 | 2. Bundesliga | 32 | 0 | 1 | 0 | — | | — | | 33 | 0 |
| FC St. Pauli | 2019–20 | 2. Bundesliga | 33 | 0 | 1 | 0 | — | | — | | 34 | 0 |
| FC St. Pauli | 2020–21 | 2. Bundesliga | 10 | 0 | 1 | 0 | — | | — | | 11 | 0 |
| FC St. Pauli | Total | | 179 | 0 | 5 | 0 | — | | — | | 184 | 0 |
| Eupen | 2020–21 | Belgian Pro League | 1 | 0 | 1 | 0 | — | | — | | 2 | 0 |
| Eupen | 2021–22 | Belgian Pro League | 14 | 0 | 1 | 0 | — | | — | | 15 | 0 |
| Eupen | Total | | 15 | 0 | 2 | 0 | — | | — | | 17 | 0 |
| Holstein Kiel | 2022–23 | 2. Bundesliga | 9 | 0 | 0 | 0 | — | | — | | 9 | 0 |
| 1. FC Kaiserslautern | 2023–24 | 2. Bundesliga | 3 | 0 | 1 | 0 | — | | — | | 4 | 0 |
| Karlsruher SC | 2024–25 | 2. Bundesliga | 0 | 0 | 0 | 0 | — | | — | | 0 | 0 |
| Career total | | | 281 | 0 | 8 | 0 | 0 | 0 | 0 | 0 | 289 | 0 |
