= Richard Neudecker =

German footballer

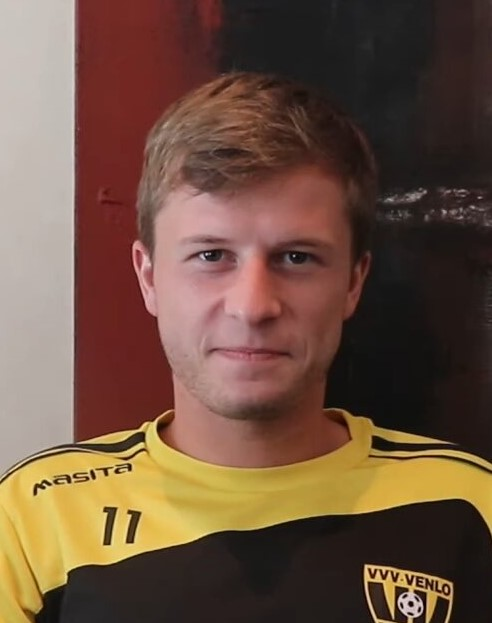
- Neudecker in 2019

Personal information
- Date of birth: 29 October 1996 (age 30)
- Place of birth: Altötting, Germany
- Height: 1.74 m (5 ft 9 in)
- Positions: Midfielder; left back

Youth career
- Ampfing
- Wacker Burghausen
- –2010: Buchbach
- 2010–2014: 1860 München

Senior career*
Years	Team	Apps	(Gls)
2014–2016	1860 München II	25	(9)
2014–2016	1860 München	6	(0)
2016–2019	FC St. Pauli	44	(6)
2019−2020	VVV-Venlo	16	(0)
2020−2022	1860 Munich	67	(13)
2022−2026	1. FC Saarbrücken	67	(11)

International career^{‡}
2012	Germany U16	1	(0)
2012	Germany U17	2	(0)
2013	Germany U18	2	(0)
2014	Germany U19	3	(1)
- * Club domestic league appearances and goals as of 20 May 2026 ‡ National team caps and goals as of 3 November 2015

Richard Neudecker (born 29 October 1996) is a German professional footballer who plays as a midfielder.

== Club career ==
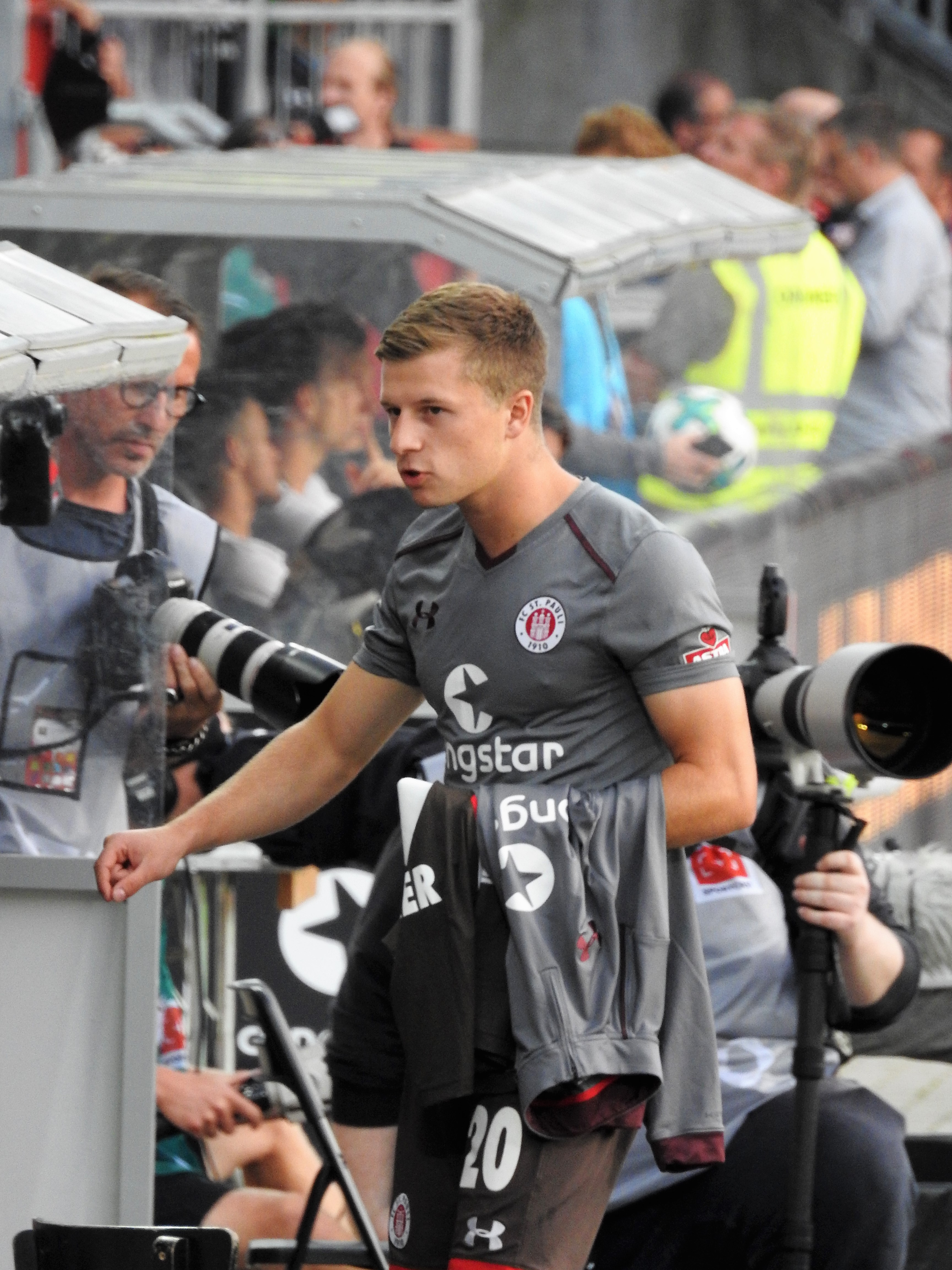
Neudecker with FC St. Pauli in 2017

Neudecker is a youth exponent from 1860 Munich. He played for the second team of the club in the Regionalliga Bayern in the 2014–15 season and most of the 2015–16 season. He made his first appearance for the first team in the second round of the 2015–16 DFB-Pokal on 27 October 2015 against Mainz 05 and subsequently on 1 November 2015 in the 2. Bundesliga against Duisburg.

Having made six appearances in the 2. Bundesliga for 1860 Munich in the 2015–16 season, he joined FC St. Pauli on a free transfer in summer 2016. Three years later he moved to the Dutch VVV-Venlo on a free transfer.

== International career ==
Neudecker made appearances for the various Germany national youth football team levels.

== Career statistics ==
As of match played 1 August 2020

Appearances and goals by club, season and competition
Club	Season	League			DFB-Pokal		Europe		Other		Total	
Club	Season	Division	Apps	Goals	Apps	Goals	Apps	Goals	Apps	Goals	Apps	Goals
1860 Munich II	2014-15	Regionalliga Bayern	20	6	—		—		—		20	6
1860 Munich II	2015–16	Regionalliga Bayern	5	3	—		—		—		5	3
1860 Munich II	Total		25	9	0	0	0	0	0	0	25	9
1860 Munich	2015–16	2. Bundesliga	6	0	2	0	—		—		8	0
FC St. Pauli II	2016–17	Regionalliga Nord	16	5	—		—		—		16	5
FC St. Pauli II	2017–18	Regionalliga Nord	4	0	—		—		—		4	0
FC St. Pauli II	Total		20	5	—		—		0	0	20	5
FC St. Pauli	2016–17	2. Bundesliga	8	0	0	0	—		—		8	0
FC St. Pauli	2017–18	2. Bundesliga	20	4	0	0	—		0	0	20	4
FC St. Pauli	2018–19	2. Bundesliga	16	2	1	0	—		0	0	17	2
FC St. Pauli	Total		44	6	1	0	0	0	0	0	45	6
VVV-Venlo	2019–20	Eredivisie	16	0	1	0	—		—		17	0
Career total			111	20	4	0	0	0	0	0	115	20
