= Christopher Avevor =

German footballer (born 1992)

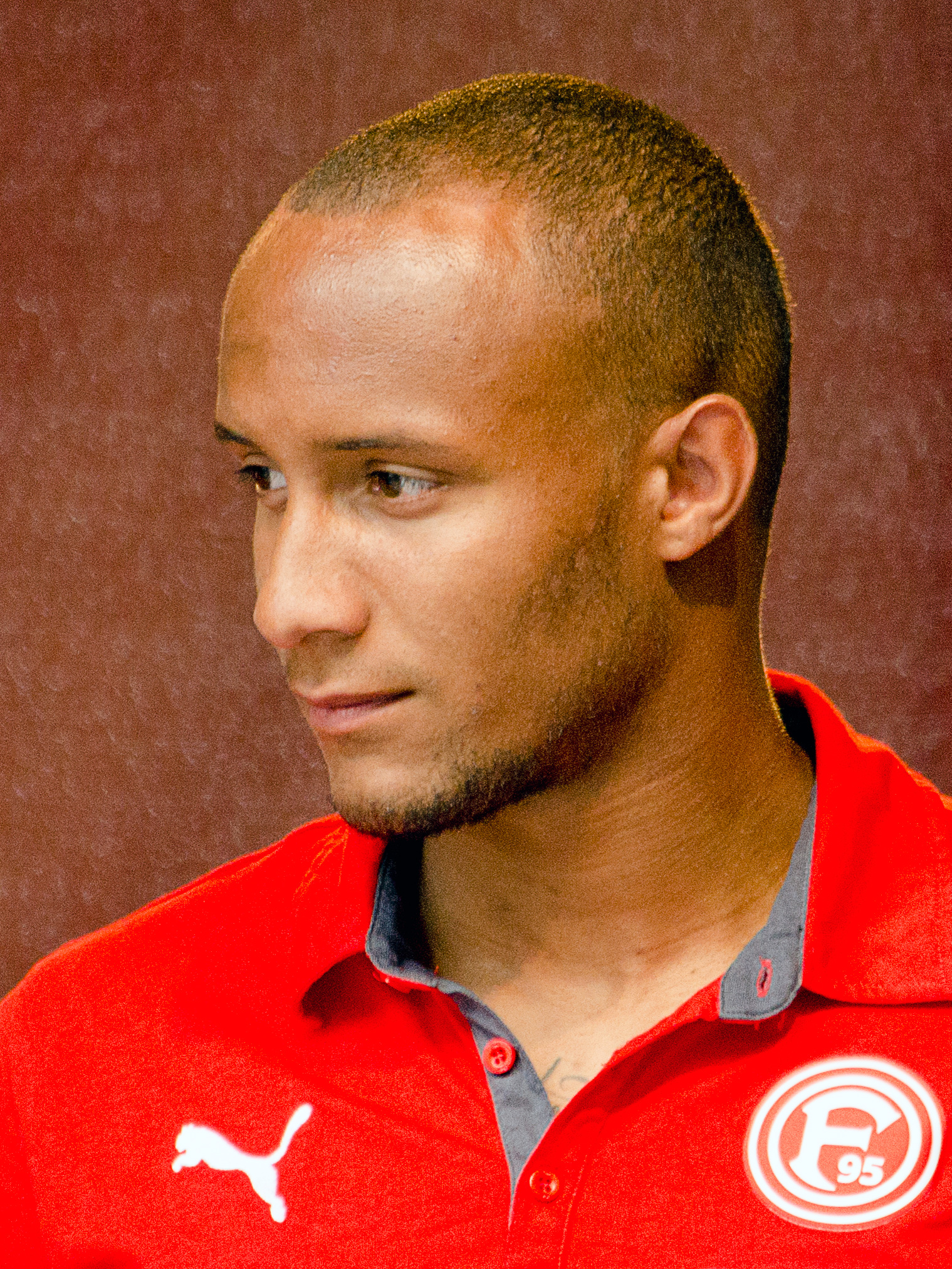
- Avevor with Fortuna Düsseldorf in 2014

Personal information
- Full name: Christopher Salon Avevor
- Date of birth: 11 February 1992 (age 34)
- Place of birth: Kiel, Germany
- Height: 1.84 m (6 ft 0 in)
- Position: Centre-back

Youth career
- Eckernförde IF
- 2004–2006: Eckernförder SV
- 2006–2008: Holstein Kiel
- 2008–2010: Hannover 96

Senior career*
Years	Team	Apps	(Gls)
2010–2014	Hannover 96 II	42	(0)
2010–2014	Hannover 96	7	(0)
2012–2013	→ FC St. Pauli (loan)	28	(1)
2014	Fortuna Düsseldorf II	1	(0)
2014–2016	Fortuna Düsseldorf	21	(0)
2016–2023	FC St. Pauli	75	(1)

International career^{‡}
2009–2010	Germany U18	3	(0)
2010	Germany U19	4	(0)
2011	Germany U20	3	(0)
- * Club domestic league appearances and goals as of 5 July 2023 ‡ National team caps and goals as of 21:50, 12 November 2012 (UTC)

Christopher Salon Avevor (born 11 February 1992) is a German professional footballer who plays as a centre-back. He represented Germany internationally at various youth levels.

== Career ==
On 29 May 2016, with his Fortuna Düsseldorf expiring at the end of the 2015–16 season, Avevor signed a three-year deal with FC St. Pauli.

== Personal life ==
Avevor's father Hope is from Ghana, while his mother Manuela is German. He grew up in the small village of Felmerholz. He has played for Germany U21 and U19 teams.

== Career statistics ==
=== Club ===
As of match played 21 December 2019

Appearances and goals by club, season and competition
Club	Season	League			DFB-Pokal		Other		Total	
Club	Season	Division	Apps	Goals	Apps	Goals	Apps	Goals	Apps	Goals
Hannover 96 II	2010–11	Regionalliga Nord	8	0	—		—		8	0
Hannover 96 II	2011–12	Regionalliga Nord	22	0	—		—		22	0
Hannover 96 II	2012–13	Regionalliga Nord	12	0	—		—		12	0
Hannover 96 II	Total		42	0	0	0	0	0	42	0
Hannover 96	2010–11	Bundesliga	5	0	0	0	—		5	0
Hannover 96	2011–12	Bundesliga	1	0	0	0	1 (Note: Appearance in the Europa League)	0	2	0
Hannover 96	2013–14	Bundesliga	1	0	0	0	0	0	1	0
Hannover 96	Total		7	0	0	0	1	0	8	0
FC St. Pauli (loan)	2012–13	2. Bundesliga	28	1	2	0	—		30	1
Fortuna Düsseldorf	2014–15	2. Bundesliga	14	0	0	0	—		14	0
Fortuna Düsseldorf	2015–16	2. Bundesliga	7	0	0	0	—		7	0
Fortuna Düsseldorf	Total		21	0	0	0	0	0	21	0
FC St. Pauli	2016–17	2. Bundesliga	7	0	2	0	—		9	0
FC St. Pauli	2017–18	2. Bundesliga	33	1	0	0	—		33	1
FC St. Pauli	2018–19	2. Bundesliga	25	0	1	1	—		26	1
FC St. Pauli	2019–20	2. Bundesliga	2	0	0	0	—		2	0
FC St. Pauli	Total		67	1	3	1	0	0	70	2
Career total			165	2	5	1	1	0	171	2
