= Dennis Rosin =

German footballer

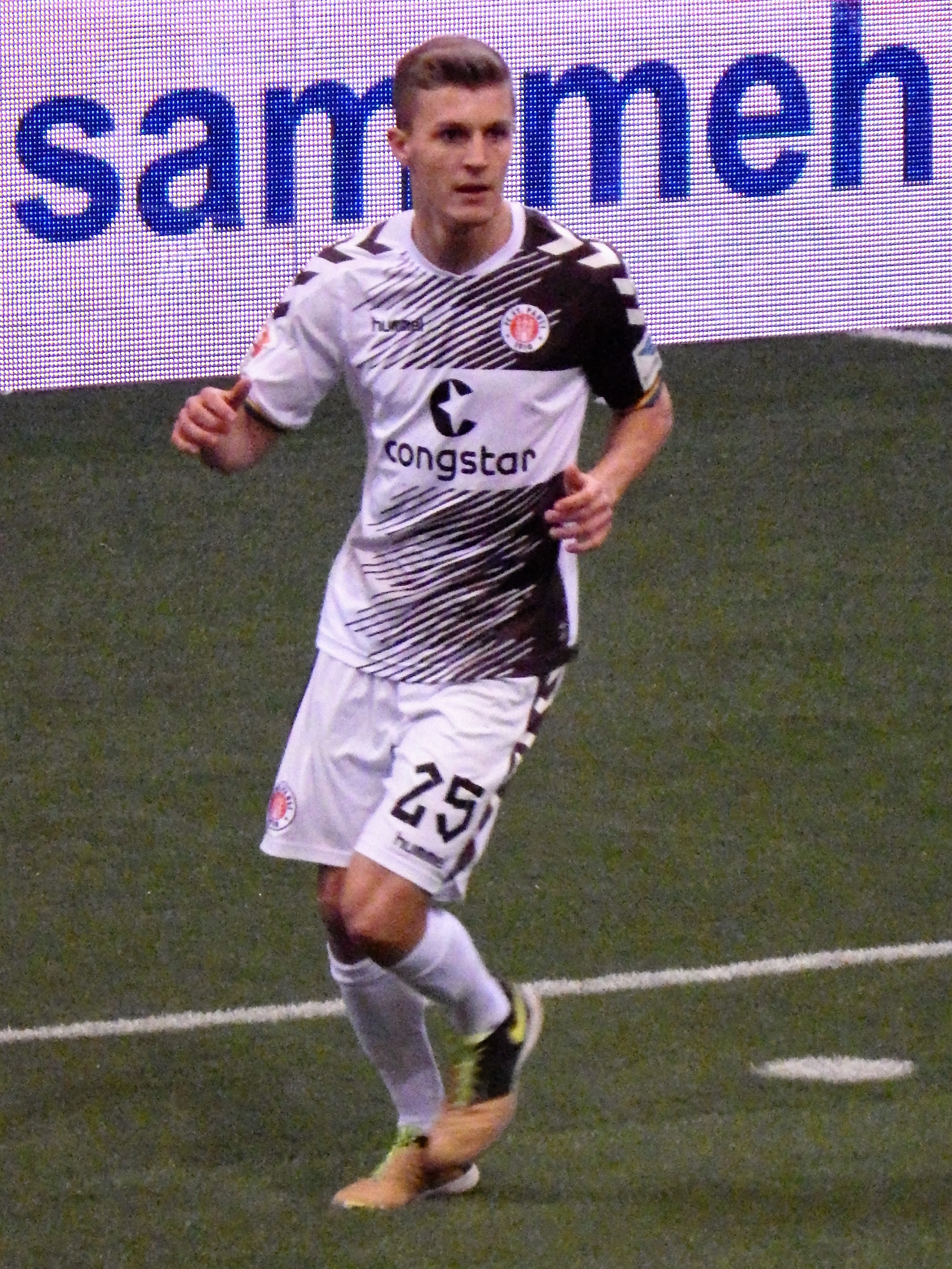
- Rosin playing for FC St. Pauli

Personal information
- Date of birth: 27 June 1996 (age 30)
- Place of birth: Hamburg, Germany
- Height: 1.82 m (6 ft 0 in)
- Position: Midfielder

Team information
- Current team: SV Drochtersen/Assel
- Number: 25

Youth career
- –2010: Hamburger SV
- 2010–2014: FC St. Pauli

Senior career*
| Years | Team | Apps | (Gls) |
| 2014–2017 | FC St. Pauli II | 40 | (3) |
| 2015–2017 | FC St. Pauli | 3 | (0) |
| 2017–2018 | Werder Bremen II | 20 | (1) |
| 2018–2019 | Sportfreunde Lotte | 5 | (0) |
| 2019 | SV Elversberg | 5 | (0) |
| 2019–2020 | VfB Oldenburg | 13 | (1) |
| 2020–2022 | Altona 93 | 25 | (2) |
| 2022– | SV Drochtersen/Assel | 114 | (15) |
- * Club domestic league appearances and goals as of 22 September 2026

Dennis Rosin (born 27 June 1996) is a German professional footballer who plays as a midfielder for SV Drochtersen/Assel.

== Career ==
In June 2017, Rosin joined the Werder Bremen reserves. In May 2018, following Werder Bremen II's relegation from the 3. Liga, it was announced Rosin would be one of ten players to leave the club.

In August 2020, Rosin moved to Regionalliga Nord side Altona 93.
