= Nico Empen =

German footballer (born 1996)

Personal information
- Date of birth: 11 January 1996 (age 30)
- Place of birth: Husum, Germany
- Height: 1.82 m (6 ft 0 in)
- Position: Centre-forward

Team information
- Current team: Weiche Flensburg
- Number: 21

Youth career
- –2010: Rödemisser SV
- 2010–2012: Holstein Kiel
- 2012–2014: FC St. Pauli

Senior career*
Years	Team	Apps	(Gls)
2014–2017	FC St. Pauli II	66	(13)
2015–2017	FC St. Pauli	2	(0)
2017–2019	Weiche Flensburg	55	(16)
2019–2020	SV Rödinghausen	6	(0)
2020–	Weiche Flensburg	20	(3)

International career
2013	Germany U18	1	(0)
- * Club domestic league appearances and goals as of 20:58, 8 December 2022 (UTC)

Nico Empen (born 11 January 1996) is a German footballer who plays as a centre-forward for Regionalliga Nord club Weiche Flensburg.
