= Maurice Litka =

German footballer

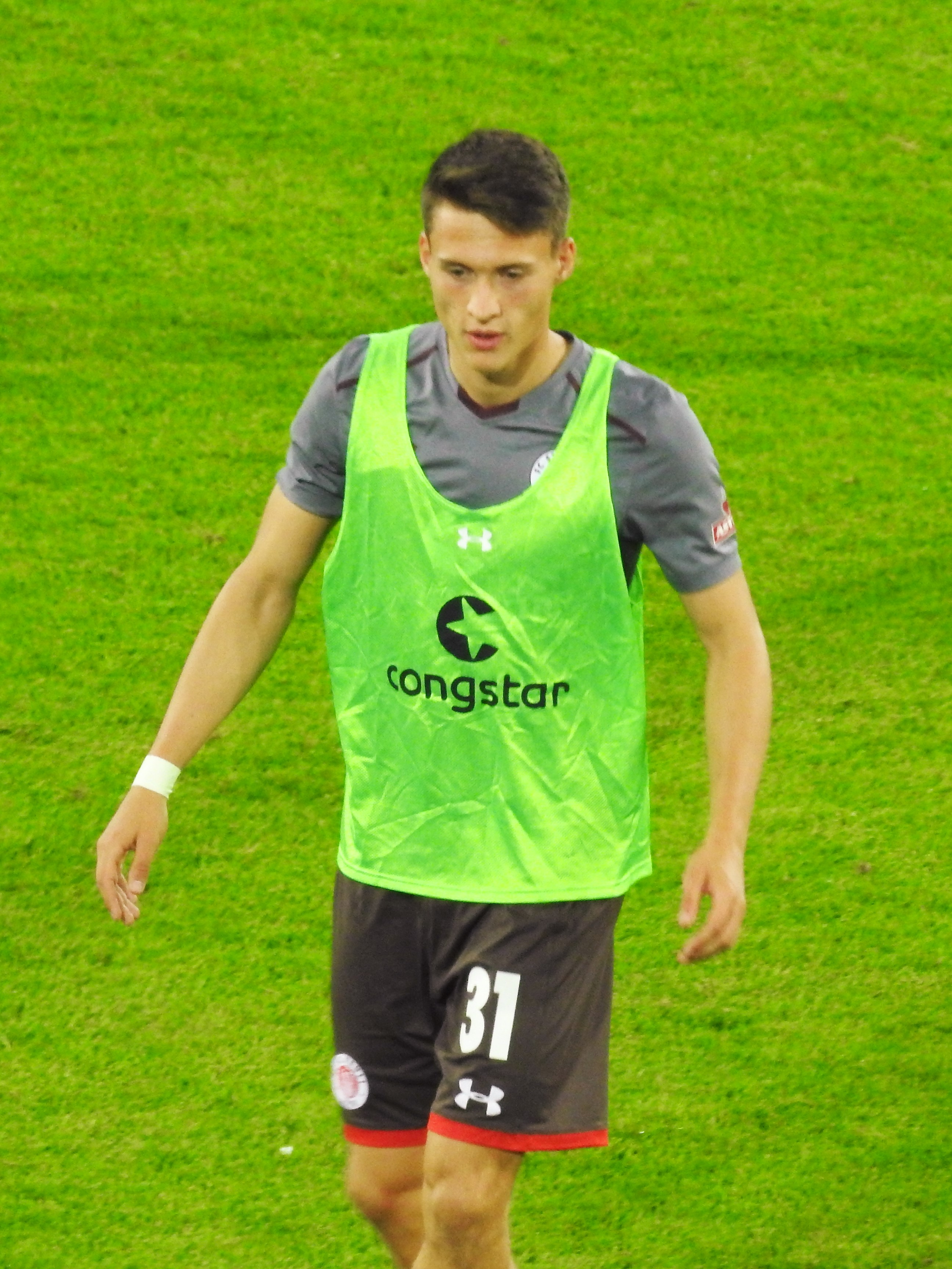
- Litka with FC St. Pauli in 2017

Personal information
- Full name: Maurice Jerome Litka
- Date of birth: 2 January 1996 (age 30)
- Place of birth: Hamburg, Germany
- Height: 1.75 m (5 ft 9 in)
- Position: Winger

Youth career
- TSV Wandsetal
- 2006–2015: FC St. Pauli

Senior career*
Years	Team	Apps	(Gls)
2014–2019	FC St. Pauli II	47	(6)
2014–2019	FC St. Pauli	19	(0)
2018–2019	→ KFC Uerdingen 05 (loan)	20	(1)
2019–2020	Preußen Münster	28	(6)
2020–2023	Hansa Rostock	16	(2)
- * Club domestic league appearances and goals

Maurice Jerome Litka (born 2 January 1996) is a German former professional footballer who played as a winger.

== Club career ==
On 29 May 2019, Preußen Münster confirmed that they had signed Litka for the 2019–20 season.
