= Joël Keller =

Swiss footballer (born 1995)

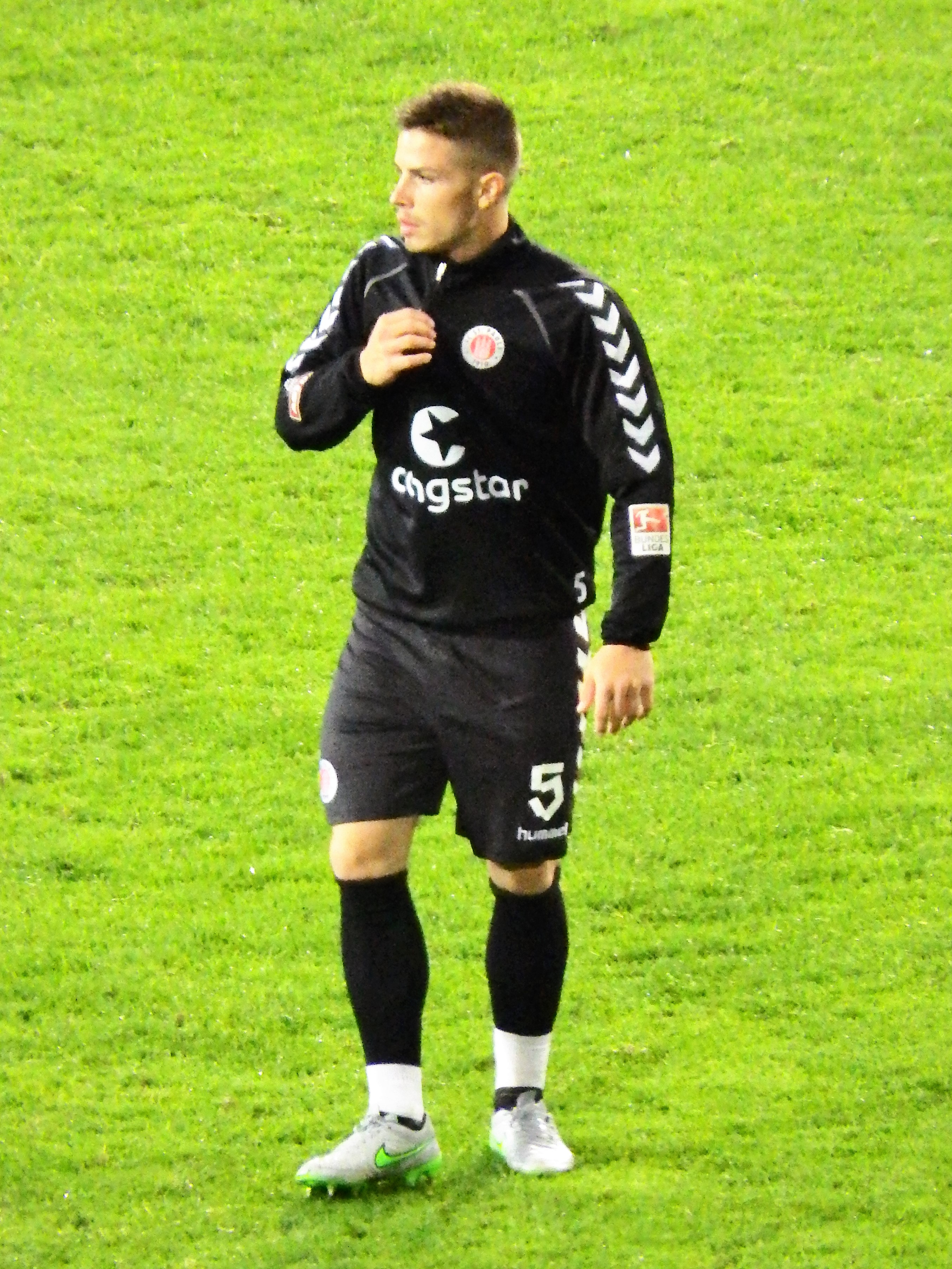
- Keller in 2015

Personal information
- Full name: Joël Patrice Keller
- Date of birth: 6 March 1995 (age 31)
- Place of birth: Endingen, Switzerland
- Height: 1.79 m (5 ft 10 in)
- Position: Defender

Youth career
- 2013–2014: FC Basel

Senior career*
Years	Team	Apps	(Gls)
2014–2015	1. FC Nürnberg II	25	(0)
2015–2018	FC St. Pauli II	51	(10)
2015–2018	FC St. Pauli	10	(0)
2018–2019	SC Weiche Flensburg 08	14	(1)
2019–2020	SC Weiche Flensburg 08 II	4	(1)
- * Club domestic league appearances and goals as of 1 July 2019

Joël Patrice Keller (born 6 March 1995) is a Swiss professional footballer who most recently played as a defender for SC Weiche Flensburg 08.

As of September 2020, Keller had left professional football and was playing for a German lower-league club.
