= Daniel Buballa =

German footballer

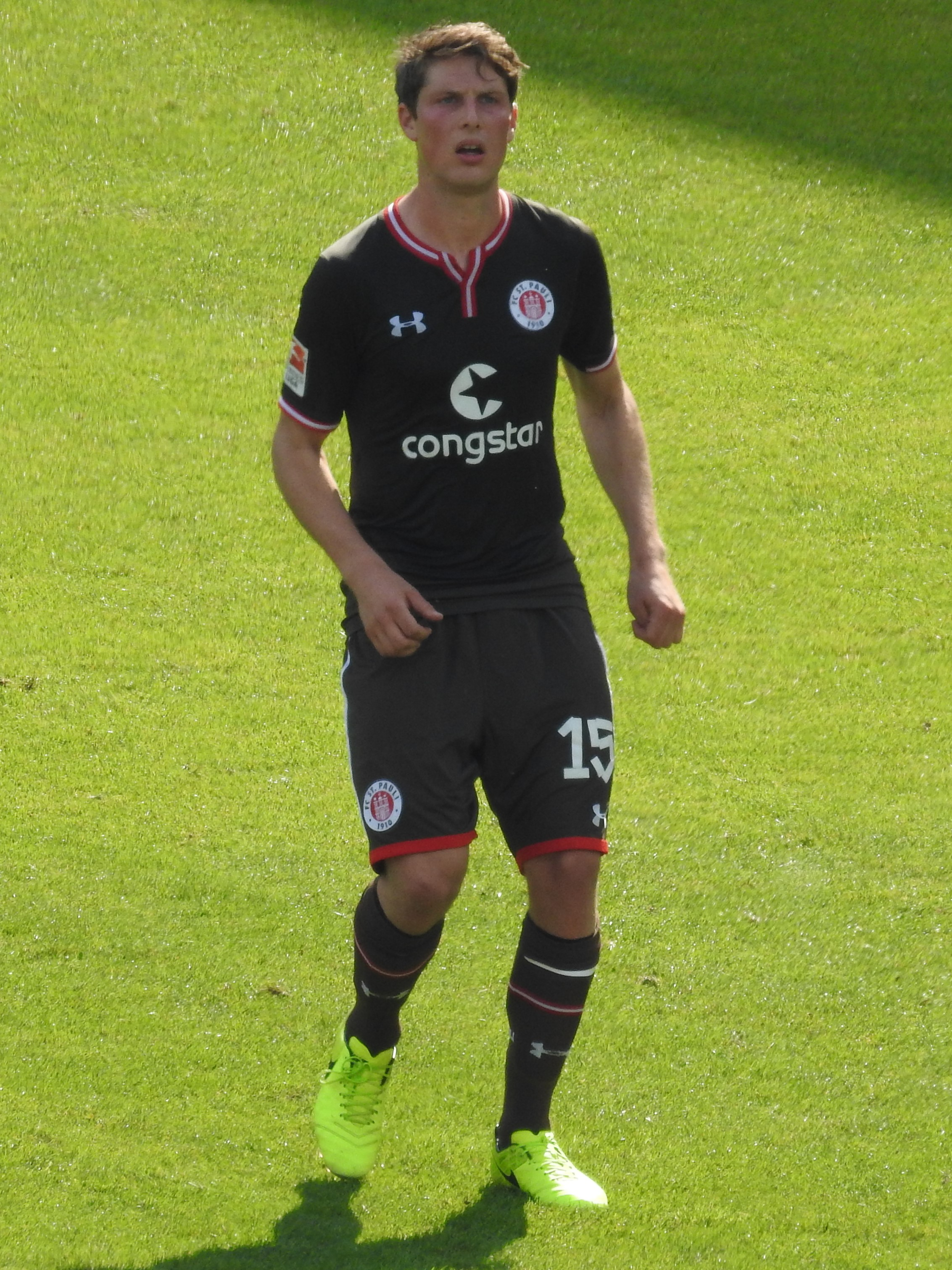
- Buballa playing for FC St. Pauli in 2017

Personal information
- Date of birth: 11 May 1990 (age 36)
- Place of birth: Bergisch Gladbach, West Germany
- Height: 1.87 m (6 ft 2 in)
- Position: Defender

Team information
- Current team: Eintracht Trier
- Number: 24

Youth career
- 1996–2009: TuS Asbach

Senior career*
Years	Team	Apps	(Gls)
2009–2010	SV Roßbach		
2011–2012	Mainz 05 II	43	(0)
2012–2014	VfR Aalen	64	(2)
2014–2021	FC St. Pauli	191	(2)
2021–2023	Viktoria Köln	28	(1)
2024–	Eintracht Trier	32	(1)
- * Club domestic league appearances and goals as of 1 January 2025

Daniel Buballa (born 11 May 1990) is a German professional footballer who plays as a defender for Eintracht Trier.
