= 2022–23 Hertha BSC season =

Hertha BSC
2022–23 season
- Director of Sport: Fredi Bobic (until 28 January); Benjamin Weber (from January)
- President: Werner Gegenbauer (until October); Kay Bernstein (from October)
- Head coach: Sandro Schwarz (until 16 April); Pál Dárdai (from 16 April)
- Stadium: Olympiastadion
- Bundesliga: 18th (relegated)
- DFB-Pokal: First round
- Top goalscorer: League: Dodi Lukebakio (11); All: Dodi Lukebakio (12)
| Home colours | Away colours | Third colours |

The 2022–23 season was the 130th season in the existence of Hertha BSC and the club's 10th consecutive season in the top flight of German football. In addition to the domestic league, Hertha BSC participated in this season's edition of the DFB-Pokal. The season covers the period from 1 July 2022 to 30 June 2023.

== Players ==
As of 31 January 2023

Note: Flags indicate national team as defined under FIFA eligibility rules; some limited exceptions apply. Players may hold more than one non-FIFA nationality.

| No. | Pos. | Nation | Player |
|---|---|---|---|
| 1 | GK | DEN | Oliver Christensen |
| 2 | DF | SVK | Peter Pekarík (3rd captain) |
| 3 | DF | URU | Agustín Rogel |
| 5 | DF | CRO | Filip Uremović |
| 6 | MF | TUR | Tolga Ciğerci |
| 7 | FW | GER | Florian Niederlechner |
| 8 | MF | GER | Suat Serdar |
| 10 | MF | NED | Jean-Paul Boëtius |
| 12 | GK | GER | Tjark Ernst |
| 14 | FW | BEL | Dodi Lukebakio |
| 16 | DF | ENG | Jonjoe Kenny |
| 17 | DF | GER | Maximilian Mittelstädt |
| 18 | FW | CIV | Wilfried Kanga |
| 19 | FW | MNE | Stevan Jovetić |

| No. | Pos. | Nation | Player |
|---|---|---|---|
| 20 | DF | GER | Marc-Oliver Kempf |
| 21 | DF | GER | Marvin Plattenhardt |
| 22 | GK | NOR | Rune Jarstein |
| 23 | FW | GER | Marco Richter |
| 24 | FW | GER | Jessic Ngankam |
| 27 | MF | GHA | Kevin-Prince Boateng |
| 28 | FW | FRA | Kélian Nsona |
| 29 | MF | FRA | Lucas Tousart |
| 31 | DF | GER | Márton Dárdai |
| 34 | MF | CRO | Ivan Šunjić (on loan from Birmingham City) |
| 39 | FW | GER | Derry Scherhant |
| 40 | FW | NGR | Chidera Ejuke (on loan from CSKA Moscow) |
| 42 | DF | GER | Julian Eitschberger |

=== Players out on loan ===
Note: Flags indicate national team as defined under FIFA eligibility rules; some limited exceptions apply. Players may hold more than one non-FIFA nationality.

| No. | Pos. | Nation | Player |
|---|---|---|---|
| — | DF | PAR | Omar Alderete (at Getafe until 30 June 2023) |
| — | MF | ARG | Santiago Ascacíbar (at Estudiantes until 30 June 2023) |
| — | DF | GER | Linus Gechter (at Eintracht Braunschweig until 30 June 2023) |
| — | FW | FRA | Myziane Maolida (at Stade Reims until 30 June 2023) |
| — | FW | POL | Krzysztof Piątek (at Salernitana until 30 June 2023) |
| — | GK | GER | Alexander Schwolow (at Schalke 04 until 30 June 2023) |
| — | FW | GER | Luca Wollschläger (at Rot-Weiss Essen until 30 June 2023) |
| — | DF | NED | Deyovaisio Zeefuik (at Hellas Verona until 30 June 2023) |

== Transfers ==
=== In ===
| No. | Pos | Player | Transferred from | Fee | Date | Source |
|---|---|---|---|---|---|---|
| 5 | DF | (Croatia) Filip Uremović | (Russia) Rubin Kazan | Free | 1 July 2022 | |
| 16 | DF | (England) Jonjoe Kenny | (England) Everton | Free | 1 July 2022 | |
| 27 | FW | (Germany) Jessic Ngankam | (Germany) Greuther Fürth | €2,000,000 | 2 July 2022 | |
| 34 | MF | (Croatia) Ivan Šunjić | (England) Birmingham City | Loan | 5 July 2022 | |
| 40 | FW | (Nigeria) Chidera Ejuke | (Russia) CSKA Moscow | Loan | 13 July 2022 | |
| 18 | FW | (Ivory Coast) Wilfried Kanga | (Switzerland) Young Boys | €4,000,000 | 30 July 2022 | |
| 10 | FW | (Netherlands) Jean-Paul Boëtius | (Germany) Mainz 05 | Free | 8 August 2022 | |
| 3 | DF | (Uruguay) Agustín Rogel | (Argentina) Estudiantes | €700,000 | 31 August 2022 | |
| 7 | FW | (Germany) Florian Niederlechner | (Germany) FC Augsburg | €500,000 | 18 January 2023 | |
| 6 | MF | (Turkey) Tolga Ciğerci | (Turkey) Ankaragücü | €350,000 | 31 January 2023 | |

=== Out ===
| No. | Pos | Player | Transferred to | Fee | Date | Source |
|---|---|---|---|---|---|---|
| 1 | GK | (Germany) Alexander Schwolow | (Germany) Schalke 04 | Loan | 1 July 2022 | |
| 5 | DF | (Germany) Niklas Stark | (Germany) Werder Bremen | Free | 1 July 2022 | |
| 12 | GK | (Germany) Nils Körber | (Germany) Hansa Rostcok | Free | 1 July 2022 | |
| 13 | MF | (Germany) Lukas Klünter | | Free | 1 July 2022 | |
| 14 | FW | (Algeria) Ishak Belfodil | | Free | 1 July 2022 | |
| 23 | MF | (Germany) Eduard Löwen | (United States) St. Louis City SC | €1,000,000 | 1 July 2022 | |
| 26 | MF | (Germany) Arne Maier | (Germany) FC Augsburg | €5,000,000 | 1 July 2022 | |
| 27 | FW | (Germany) Jessic Ngankam | (Germany) Greuther Fürth | €1,500,000 | 1 July 2022 | |
| 33 | FW | (Netherlands) Daishawn Redan | (Netherlands) Utrecht | Loan | 1 July 2022 | |
| 37 | GK | (Poland) Marcel Lotka | (Germany) Borussia Dortmund | Free | 1 July 2022 | |
| 46 | FW | (Germany) Anton Kade | (Switzerland) FC Basel | €1,000,000 | 1 July 2022 | |
| 16 | MF | (Netherlands) Javairô Dilrosun | (Netherlands) Feyenoord | Undisclosed | 11 July 2022 | |
| 25 | DF | (Germany) Jordan Torunarigha | (Belgium) Gent | €4,500,000 | 19 July 2022 | |
| 18 | MF | (Argentina) Santiago Ascacíbar | (Italy) Cremonese | Loan | 23 July 2022 | |
| 10 | MF | (Netherlands) Jurgen Ekkelenkamp | (Belgium) Royal Antwerp | €5,000,000 | 8 August 2022 | |
| | DF | (Paraguay) Omar Alderete | (Spain) Getafe | Loan | 19 August 2022 | |
| 4 | DF | (Belgium) Dedryck Boyata | (Belgium) Club Brugge | €2,000,000 | 22 August 2022 | |
| 3 | DF | (Norway) Fredrik André Bjørkan | (Netherlands) Feyenoord | Loan | 29 August 2022 | |
| 9 | FW | (Poland) Krzysztof Piątek | (Italy) Salernitana | Loan | 1 September 2022 | |
| 24 | FW | (Germany) Luca Wollschläger | (Germany) Rot-Weiss Essen | Loan | 1 September 2022 | |
| 6 | MF | (Czech Republic) Vladimir Darida | (Greece) Aris | Undisclosed | 1 January 2023 | |
| 30 | FW | (South Korea) Lee Dong-jun | (South Korea) Jeonbuk Hyundai Motors | Undisclosed | 1 January 2023 | |
| 44 | DF | (Germany) Linus Gechter | (Germany) Eintracht Braunschweig | Loan | 1 January 2023 | |
| 7 | FW | (Germany) Davie Selke | (Germany) 1. FC Köln | Free | 2 January 2023 | |
| 3 | DF | (Norway) Fredrik André Bjørkan | (Norway) Bodø/Glimt | Free | 4 January 2023 | |
| 36 | DF | (Netherlands) Deyovaisio Zeefuik | (Italy) Hellas Verona | Loan | 16 January 2023 | |
| 18 | MF | (Argentina) Santiago Ascacíbar | (Argentina) Estudiantes | Loan | 18 January 2023 | |
| 11 | FW | (France) Myziane Maolida | (France) Stade Reims | Loan | 31 January 2023 | |
| 33 | FW | (Netherlands) Daishawn Redan | (Italy) Venezia | Undisclosed | 31 January 2023 | |

== Pre-season and friendlies ==
Win Draw Loss Fixtures

| 29 June 2022 Friendly | Hertha BSC (Germany) | 7–0 | (Germany) TuS Makkabi Berlin | Brandenburg |
| 18:00 CEST (UTC+2) | Selke 12' (pen.), 17'; Richter 18'; Uremović 38'; Scherhant 69'; Ascacíbar 78'; Darida 86' | Report | | Stadium: Bundesleistungszentrum Kienbaum; Attendance: 0 Referee: Philipp Vierock |

| 2 July 2022 Friendly | SV Babelsberg 03 (Germany) | 0–1 | (Germany) Hertha BSC | Potsdam |
| 16:00 CEST (UTC+2) | | Report | Richter 9' | Stadium: Karl-Liebknecht-Stadion; Attendance: 3,695; Referee: Andy Stolz |

| 8 July 2022 Friendly | Energie Cottbus (Germany) | 1–5 | (Germany) Hertha BSC | Cottbus |
| 19:00 CEST (UTC+2) | Slamar 67' | Report | Selke 45'; Wollschläger 59', 61'; Lukebakio 76'; Maolida 81' | Stadium: Stadion der Freundschaft; Attendance: 4,912; Referee: Richard Hempel |

| 16 July 2022 Friendly | FC Halifax Town (England) | 1–1 | (Germany) Hertha BSC | Burton upon Trent, England |
| 11:00 BST (UTC+1) | Debrah 8' | Report | Mittelstädt 36' | Stadium: Sir Bobby Charlton Pitch |
Note: Match was one period of 45 minutes.

| 16 July 2022 Friendly | Salford City (England) | 0–1 | (Germany) Hertha BSC | Burton upon Trent, England |
| 12:00 BST (UTC+1) | | Report | Torunarigha 28' | Stadium: Sir Bobby Charlton Pitch |
Note: Match was one period of 45 minutes.

| 16 July 2022 Friendly | Derby County (England) | 1–0 | (Germany) Hertha BSC | Derby, England |
| 16:00 BST (UTC+1) | Mendez-Laing 39' | Report | Gechter (yellow card) 52' | Stadium: Pride Park Stadium; Attendance: 7,043 |

| 20 July 2022 Friendly | Nottingham Forest (England) | 3–1 | (Germany) Hertha BSC | Burton upon Trent, England |
| 19:00 BST (UTC+1) | L. Taylor 9', 20'; Ullrich 84' (o.g.) | Report | Scherhant 45' | Stadium: Pirelli Stadium |

| 23 July 2022 Friendly | West Bromwich Albion (England) | 2–1 | (Germany) Hertha BSC | West Bromwich, England |
| 15:00 BST (UTC+1) | Swift 70'; Dike 73' | Report | Selke 13' | Stadium: The Hawthorns; Referee: Bobby Madley (England) |

| 22 September 2022 Friendly | 1. FC Frankfurt (Germany) | 0–8 | (Germany) Hertha BSC | Frankfurt (Oder) |
| 16:30 CEST (UTC+2) | | Report | Richter 18'; Maolida 19', 29'; Ngankam 24'; Darida 36', 56', 66'; Mittelstädt 64' | Stadium: Stadion der Freundschaft; Attendance: 3,942; Referee: Marcel Riemer |

| 19 November 2022 Wörthersee Cup | Hertha BSC (Germany) | 3–3 (3–4 p) | (Germany) 1860 Munich | Klagenfurt, Austria |
| 16:00 CET (UTC+1) | Kanga 41'; Moll 54' (o.g.); Lukebakio 87' | Report | Richter 20'; Lakenmacher 73'; Morgalla 90' | Stadium: 28 Black Arena |

| 20 November 2022 Wörthersee Cup | Hertha BSC (Germany) | 1–1 (4–3 p) | (Austria) Grazer AK | Klagenfurt, Austria |
| 14:00 CET (UTC+1) | Scherhant 62' | Report | Liendl 29' | Stadium: Wörthersee Stadion |

| 26 November 2022 Friendly | Ludwigsfelder FC (Germany) | 0–5 | (Germany) Hertha BSC | Ludwigsfelde |
| 13:00 CET (UTC+1) | | Report | Scherhant 16'; Ejuke 34'; Richter 42'; Lee 49', (penalty missed) 86'; Kanga 52' | Stadium: Waldstadion; Attendance: 2,500; Referee: Hannes Wilke |

| 2 December 2022 Friendly | Hannover 96 (Germany) | 1–2 | (Germany) Hertha BSC | Hanover |
| 15:00 CET (UTC+1) | | | | Stadium: Niedersachsenstadion |

| 7 December 2022 Friendly | Hertha BSC (Germany) | 1–0 | (Germany) Eintracht Braunschweig | Berlin |
| 13:00 CET (UTC+1) | | | | Stadium: Hanns-Braun-Stadion |

| 8 January 2023 Friendly | Hertha BSC (Germany) | 3–0 | (United States) Club de Lyon | Bradenton, Florida |
| 14:00 EST (UTC−5) | Maolida 23' (pen.); Boateng 31'; Ngankam 61' (pen.) | Report | | Stadium: IMG Academy; Referee: Alejo Calume |

| 8 January 2023 Friendly | Hertha BSC (Germany) | 7–1 | (United States) The Villages SC | Bradenton, Florida |
| 17:00 EST (UTC−5) | Kanga 19', 36', 77'; Jovetić 26'; Richter 59', 65'; Šunjić 90' | Report | Mauro 12' | Stadium: IMG Academy; Referee: Gabriele Giusti |

| 11 January 2023 Friendly | Hertha BSC (Germany) | 7–0 | (United States) SIMA Montverde Academy | Bradenton, Florida |
| 12:00 EST (UTC−5) | Maolida 17'; Serdar 22'; Jovetić 27', 51', 65'; Ngankam 35'; Lukebakio 83' | Report | | Stadium: IMG Academy; Referee: Santiago Lorenzo |

| 11 January 2023 Friendly | Hertha BSC (Germany) | 2–2 | (Colombia) Millonarios | Kissimmee, Florida |
| 19:00 EST (UTC−5) | Kanga 56' (pen.); Tousart 69' | Report | Silva 9'; Ruiz 53' | Stadium: Osceola County Stadium; Attendance: 1,540; Referee: Amiel Aleman |

== Competitions ==
=== Overall record ===
| Competition | First match | Last match | Starting round | Final position | Record | | | | | | | |
| Competition | First match | Last match | Starting round | Final position | Pld | W | D | L | GF | GA | GD | Win % |
|---|---|---|---|---|---|---|---|---|---|---|---|---|
| Bundesliga | 6 August 2022 | 27 May 2023 | Matchday 1 | 18th | 34 | 7 | 8 | 19 | 42 | 69 | −27 | 20.59 |
| DFB-Pokal | 31 July 2022 | | First round | First round | 1 | 0 | 1 | 0 | 4 | 4 | +0 | 0.00 |
| Total | | | | | 35 | 7 | 9 | 19 | 46 | 73 | −27 | 20.00 |

Source: Soccerway

=== Bundesliga ===
==== League table ====
| Pos | Team | Pld | W | D | L | GF | GA | GD | Pts | Qualification or relegation |
|---|---|---|---|---|---|---|---|---|---|---|
| 14 | VfL Bochum | 34 | 10 | 5 | 19 | 40 | 72 | −32 | 35 | |
| 15 | FC Augsburg | 34 | 9 | 7 | 18 | 42 | 63 | −21 | 34 | |
| 16 | VfB Stuttgart (O) | 34 | 7 | 12 | 15 | 45 | 57 | −12 | 33 | Qualification for the relegation play-offs |
| 17 | Schalke 04 (R) | 34 | 7 | 10 | 17 | 35 | 71 | −36 | 31 | Relegation to 2. Bundesliga |
| 18 | Hertha BSC (R) | 34 | 7 | 8 | 19 | 42 | 69 | −27 | 29 | Relegation to 2. Bundesliga |

Source: DFB
Rules for classification: 1) Points; 2) Goal difference; 3) Goals scored; 4) Head-to-head results; 5) Head-to-head away goals scored; 6) Away goals scored; 7) Play-off.
(O) Play-off winners; (R) Relegated

==== Results summary ====
| Overall | | | | | | | | Home | | | | | | Away | | | | | |
| Pld | W | D | L | GF | GA | GD | Pts | W | D | L | GF | GA | GD | W | D | L | GF | GA | GD |
|---|---|---|---|---|---|---|---|---|---|---|---|---|---|---|---|---|---|---|---|
| 34 | 7 | 8 | 19 | 42 | 69 | −27 | 29 | 5 | 6 | 6 | 24 | 27 | −3 | 2 | 2 | 13 | 18 | 42 | −24 |

Source: DFB

==== Results by round ====
| Round | 1 | 2 | 3 | 4 | 5 | 6 | 7 | 8 | 9 | 10 | 11 | 12 | 13 | 14 | 15 | 16 | 17 | 18 | 19 | 20 | 21 | 22 | 23 | 24 | 25 | 26 | 27 | 28 | 29 | 30 | 31 | 32 | 33 | 34 |
|---|---|---|---|---|---|---|---|---|---|---|---|---|---|---|---|---|---|---|---|---|---|---|---|---|---|---|---|---|---|---|---|---|---|---|
| Ground | A | H | A | H | A | H | A | H | H | A | H | A | H | A | H | A | H | H | A | H | A | H | A | H | A | A | H | A | H | A | H | A | H | A |
| Result | L | D | L | L | W | D | D | D | D | L | W | L | L | L | W | L | L | L | L | W | L | W | L | D | L | D | L | L | L | L | W | L | D | W |
| Position | 14 | 14 | 16 | 17 | 13 | 15 | 13 | 14 | 14 | 15 | 13 | 14 | 15 | 16 | 15 | 17 | 17 | 17 | 17 | 16 | 17 | 14 | 14 | 15 | 16 | 16 | 17 | 18 | 18 | 18 | 18 | 18 | 18 | 18 |

Source: DFB
A = Away; H = Home; W = Win; D = Draw; L = Loss

==== Matches ====
The league fixtures were announced on 17 June 2022.

| 6 August 2022 1 | Union Berlin | 3–1 | Hertha BSC | Berlin |
| 15:30 CEST (UTC+2) | Pefok 31'; Knoche (yellow card) 35', (goal) 54'; Becker 50'; Leweling (yellow card) 90+3' | Report | Uremović (yellow card) 52'; Šunjić (yellow card) 77'; Lukebakio 85', (yellow card) 87' | Stadium: Stadion An der Alten Försterei; Attendance: 22,012; Referee: Marco Fritz |

| 13 August 2022 2 | Hertha BSC | 1–1 | Eintracht Frankfurt | Berlin |
| 15:30 CEST (UTC+2) | Serdar 3', (yellow card) 85'; Mittelstädt (yellow card) 33'; Šunjić (yellow card) 57' | Report | Kamada 48'; Sow (yellow card) 58' | Stadium: Olympiastadion; Attendance: 45,000; Referee: Frank Willenborg |

| 19 August 2022 3 | Borussia Mönchengladbach | 1–0 | Hertha BSC | Mönchengladbach |
| 20:30 CEST (UTC+2) | Pléa 34' (pen.); Hofmann (penalty missed) 70'; Herrmann (yellow card) 90+5' | Report | Uremović (yellow card) 34' (yellow-red card) 69' | Stadium: Borussia-Park; Attendance: 48,411; Referee: Matthias Jöllenbeck |

| 27 August 2022 4 | Hertha BSC | 0–1 | Borussia Dortmund | Berlin |
| 15:30 CEST (UTC+2) | Richter (yellow card) 90+2' | Report | Modeste 32' | Stadium: Olympiastadion; Attendance: 62,142; Referee: Tobias Stieler |

| 4 September 2022 5 | FC Augsburg | 0–2 | Hertha BSC | Augsburg |
| 15:30 CEST (UTC+2) | Gruezo (yellow card) 31'; Berisha (yellow card) 72' | Report | Uremović (yellow card) 23'; Lukebakio 57'; Richter 90+3' | Stadium: WWK Arena; Attendance: 25,789; Referee: Harm Osmers |

| 10 September 2022 6 | Hertha BSC | 2–2 | Bayer Leverkusen | Berlin |
| 15:30 CEST (UTC+2) | Serdar (yellow card) 26', (goal) 55'; Šunjić (yellow card) 48'; Richter 74'; Selke (yellow card) 86' | Report | Demirbay 49'; Aránguiz (yellow card) 52'; Schick 79' | Stadium: Olympiastadion; Attendance: 40,643; Referee: Benjamin Brand |

| 16 September 2022 7 | Mainz 05 | 1–1 | Hertha BSC | Mainz |
| 20:30 CEST (UTC+2) | Kohr (yellow card) 40'; Mustapha (yellow card) 67'; Onisiwo (yellow card) 74'; Caci 90+4' | Report | Tousart 30'; Plattenhardt (yellow card) 48'; Lukebakio (yellow card) 58'; Dárdai (yellow card) 64'; Boëtius (yellow card) 65'; Christensen (yellow card) 90+4' | Stadium: Mewa Arena; Attendance: 25,300; Referee: Frank Willenborg |

| 2 October 2022 8 | Hertha BSC | 1–1 | 1899 Hoffenheim | Berlin |
| 15:30 CEST (UTC+2) | Serdar (yellow card) 22'; Šunjić (yellow card) 29'; Lukebakio 37' | Report | Kramarić 25'; Geiger (yellow card) 29' | Stadium: Olympiastadion; Attendance: 41,653; Referee: Christian Dingert |

| 9 October 2022 9 | Hertha BSC | 2–2 | SC Freiburg | Berlin |
| 17:30 CEST (UTC+2) | Lukebakio 34' (pen.); Rogel (yellow card) 43'; Kenny (yellow card) 49'; Serdar 61' | Report | Kyereh 22'; Schade 78'; Dōan (yellow card) 83' | Stadium: Olympiastadion; Attendance: 40,481; Referee: Robert Schröder |

| 15 October 2022 10 | RB Leipzig | 3–2 | Hertha BSC | Leipzig |
| 18:30 CEST (UTC+2) | Forsberg 25'; Diallo 30'; Haidara (yellow card) 38'; Orbán 45'; Kampl (yellow card) 63' | Report | Kempf (yellow card) 32'; Plattenhardt (yellow card) 41'; Lukebakio 62' (pen.); Jovetić 64'; Rogel (yellow card) 90+3' | Stadium: Red Bull Arena; Attendance: 47,069; Referee: Harm Osmers |

| 23 October 2022 11 | Hertha BSC | 2–1 | Schalke 04 | Berlin |
| 17:30 CEST (UTC+2) | Tousart 49'; Kanga (yellow card) 75', (goal) 88'; Rogel (yellow card) 81'; Lukebakio (yellow card) 90+1'; Richter (yellow card) 90+3'; Boetius (yellow card) 90+6' | Report | Mollet 85'; Polter (yellow card) 86' | Stadium: Olympiastadion; Attendance: 60,165; Referee: Martin Petersen |

| 28 October 2022 12 | Werder Bremen | 1–0 | Hertha BSC | Bremen |
| 20:30 CEST (UTC+2) | Weiser (yellow card) 55'; Stark (yellow card) 60'; Füllkrug 85' | Report | Kanga (yellow card) 17'; Lukebakio (yellow card) 44'; Serdar (yellow card) 58' | Stadium: Weserstadion; Attendance: 42,100; Referee: Tobias Reichel |

| 5 November 2022 13 | Hertha BSC | 2–3 | Bayern Munich | Berlin |
| 15:30 CET (UTC+1) | Lukebakio 40'; Selke 45' (pen.) | Report | Musiala 12'; Choupo-Moting 37', 38' | Stadium: Olympiastadion; Attendance: 74,667; Referee: Bastian Dankert |

| 8 November 2022 14 | VfB Stuttgart | 2–1 | Hertha BSC | Stuttgart |
| 20:30 CET (UTC+1) | Guirassy 3'; Egloff (yellow card) 56'; Sosa (yellow card) 73'; Mavropanos (yellow card) 34', (goal) 90+8' | Report | Lukebakio 19'; Kempf (yellow card) 31'; Richter (yellow card) 34' | Stadium: Mercedes-Benz Arena; Attendance: 44,500; Referee: Frank Willenborg |

| 12 November 2022 15 | Hertha BSC | 2–0 | 1. FC Köln | Berlin |
| 15:30 CET (UTC+1) | Kanga 9'; Richter 54'; Kempf (yellow card) 62'; Rogel (yellow card) 62'; Lukebakio (yellow card) 66' | Report | Skhiri (yellow card) 73' | Stadium: Olympiastadion; Attendance: 60,827; Referee: Christian Dingert |

| 21 January 2023 16 | VfL Bochum | 3–1 | Hertha BSC | Bochum |
| 15:30 CET (UTC+1) | Hofmann 22', 56'; Soares (yellow card) 82'; Schlotterbeck 44' | Report | Kempf (yellow card) 39'; Serdar 87' | Stadium: Vonovia Ruhrstadion; Attendance: 26,000; Referee: Martin Petersen |

| 24 January 2023 17 | Hertha BSC | 0–5 | VfL Wolfsburg | Berlin |
| 20:30 CET (UTC+1) | Rogel (yellow card) 28'; Lukebakio (yellow card) 30' | Report | Svanberg 4'; Arnold 31' (pen.); Wind 34'; Baku 72'; Marmoush 86' | Stadium: Olympiastadion; Attendance: 29,483; Referee: Tobias Reichel |

| 28 January 2023 18 | Hertha BSC | 0–2 | Union Berlin | Berlin |
| 15:30 CET (UTC+1) | Boateng (yellow card) 90+4' | Report | Doekhi 44'; Khedira (yellow card) 49'; Seguin 67', (yellow card) 90' | Stadium: Olympiastadion; Attendance: 74,667; Referee: Felix Brych |

| 4 February 2023 19 | Eintracht Frankfurt | 3–0 | Hertha BSC | Frankfurt |
| 15:30 CET (UTC+1) | Kolo Muani 21' (pen.), 28'; Tuta (yellow card) 63'; Buta 90+3' | Report | Niederlechner (yellow card) 22'; Mittelstädt (yellow card) 57' | Stadium: Deutsche Bank Park; Attendance: 49,500; Referee: Robert Hartmann |

| 12 February 2023 20 | Hertha BSC | 4–1 | Borussia Mönchengladbach | Berlin |
| 15:30 CET (UTC+1) | Ngankam 30'; Dardai 52'; Uremović (yellow card) 87'; Scherhant 90+1'; Lukebakio 90+7' (pen.) | Report | Elvedi 17'; Koné (yellow card) 90+6' | Stadium: Olympiastadion; Attendance: 40,973; Referee: Christian Dingert |

| 19 February 2023 21 | Borussia Dortmund | 4–1 | Hertha BSC | Dortmund |
| 17:30 CEST (UTC+2) | Adeyemi 27'; Malen 32'; Ryerson (yellow card) 58'; Reus 76'; Brandt 90' | Report | Tousart 46'; Ciğerci (yellow card) 58'; Rogel (yellow card) 75' | Stadium: Signal Iduna Park; Attendance: 81,365; Referee: Harm Osmers |

| 25 February 2023 22 | Hertha BSC | 2–0 | FC Augsburg | Berlin |
| 15:30 CET (UTC+1) | Richter (yellow card) 35', (goal) 61'; Lukebakio 70' | Report | Gumny (yellow card) 45+1'; Veiga (yellow card) 60'; Vargas (yellow card) 90+1' | Stadium: Olympiastadion; Attendance: 40,522; Referee: Matthias Jöllenbeck |

| 5 March 2023 23 | Bayer Leverkusen | 4–1 | Hertha BSC | Leverkusen |
| 15:30 CET (UTC+1) | Azmoun 12'; Frimpong 21'; Diaby 60'; Adli 73'; Tah (yellow card) 75' | Report | Lukebakio 67' (pen.); Ngankam (yellow card) 75'; Kenny (yellow card) 87' | Stadium: BayArena; Attendance: 30,210; Referee: Patrick Ittrich |

| 11 March 2023 24 | Hertha BSC | 1–1 | Mainz 05 | Berlin |
| 15:30 CET (UTC+1) | Ngankam 18' (pen.); Ciğerci (yellow card) 22'; Tousart (yellow card) 66' | Report | Hanche-Olsen (yellow card) 52'; Ajorque 57' | Stadium: Olympiastadion; Attendance: 41,689; Referee: Benjamin Cortus |

| 18 March 2023 25 | 1899 Hoffenheim | 3–1 | Hertha BSC | Sinsheim |
| 15:30 CET (UTC+1) | Kramarić 24' (pen.), 37' (pen.); Bebou 51'; Dabbur (red card) 71' | Report | Richter (yellow card) 27'; Ngankam (yellow card) 78'; Mittelstädt (yellow card) 85'; Jovetić 90+2' | Stadium: PreZero Arena; Attendance: 25,027; Referee: Frank Willenborg |

| 1 April 2023 26 | SC Freiburg | 1–1 | Hertha BSC | Freiburg |
| 15:30 CEST (UTC+2) | Gulde (yellow card) 28'; Grifo 52' | Report | Ngankam 77', (yellow card) 90+2' | Stadium: Europa-Park Stadion; Attendance: 34,700; Referee: Sven Jablonski |

| 8 April 2023 27 | Hertha BSC | 0–1 | RB Leipzig | Berlin |
| 18:30 CEST (UTC+2) | Lukebakio (yellow card) 31'; Uremović (yellow card) 45'; Boateng (yellow card) 45'; Kanga (yellow card) 70' | Report | Szoboszlai (yellow card) 20'; Haidara 39', (yellow card) 45'; Simakan (yellow card) 90' | Stadium: Olympiastadion; Attendance: 50,679; Referee: Deniz Aytekin |

| 14 April 2023 28 | Schalke 04 | 5–2 | Hertha BSC | Gelsenkirchen |
| 20:30 CEST (UTC+2) | Skarke 3'; Bülter 13', 78'; Terodde 48'; Krauß (yellow card) 86'; Jenz (yellow card) 87'; Kamiński 90+2' | Report | Boateng (yellow card) 40'; Jovetić 45+3'; Ngankam (yellow card) 70'; Richter 84'; Uremović (yellow card) 90' | Stadium: Veltins-Arena; Attendance: 61,981; Referee: Felix Brych |

| 22 April 2023 29 | Hertha BSC | 2–4 | Werder Bremen | Berlin |
| 15:30 CEST (UTC+2) | Kempf (yellow card) 29'; Ngankam 68'; Lukebakio 79' (pen.); Serdar (yellow card) 90' | Report | Ducksch 6', 27', 51'; Stage (yellow card) 36'; Weiser 63'; Schmid (yellow card) 90+4' | Stadium: Olympiastadion; Attendance: 74,667; Referee: Robert Schröder |

| 30 April 2023 30 | Bayern Munich | 2–0 | Hertha BSC | Munich |
| 15:30 CEST (UTC+2) | Goretzka (yellow card) 25'; Cancelo (yellow card) 67'; Gnabry 69'; Coman 79' | Report | | Stadium: Allianz Arena; Attendance: 75,000; Referee: Patrick Ittrich |

| 6 May 2023 31 | Hertha BSC | 2–1 | VfB Stuttgart | Berlin |
| 15:30 CEST (UTC+2) | Uremović (yellow card) 18'; Niederlechner (yellow card) 19', (goal) 45+2'; Kempf 29'; Richter (yellow card) 66'; Christensen (yellow card) 90' | Report | Guirassy 38'; Endo (yellow card) 63' | Stadium: Olympiastadion; Attendance: 63,443; Referee: Deniz Aytekin |

| 12 May 2023 32 | 1. FC Köln | 5–2 | Hertha BSC | Cologne |
| 20:30 CEST (UTC+2) | Selke 8'; Martel (yellow card) 24'; Hübers 39', 69', (yellow card) 72'; Skhiri 43'; Huseinbašić 81' | Report | Tousart 18'; Jovetić 33'; Lukebakio (yellow card) 37'; Dárdai (yellow card) 45+5'; Mittelstädt (yellow card) 73'; Rogel (yellow card) 78'; Serdar (yellow card) 90+1'; Ngankam (yellow card) 90+1'; Richter (yellow card) 90+2' | Stadium: RheinEnergieStadion; Attendance: 50,000; Referee: Sven Jablonski |

| 20 May 2023 33 | Hertha BSC | 1–1 | VfL Bochum | Berlin |
| 15:30 CEST (UTC+2) | Tousart 63'; Mittelstädt (yellow card) 82' | Report | Losilla (yellow card) 37'; Schlotterbeck 90+4' | Stadium: Olympiastadion; Attendance: 70,692; Referee: Felix Brych |

| 27 May 2023 34 | VfL Wolfsburg | 1–2 | Hertha BSC | Wolfsburg |
| 15:30 CEST (UTC+2) | Kamiński 2'; Bornauw (yellow card) 67' | Report | Serdar (yellow card) 44'; Kenny (yellow card) 45+5'; Plattenhardt (yellow card) 48'; Maza 55'; Richter 68', (yellow card) 90+1'; Boëtius (yellow card) 90+3' | Stadium: Volkswagen Arena; Attendance: 26,775; Referee: Benjamin Cortus |

=== DFB-Pokal ===
| 31 July 2022 First round | Eintracht Braunschweig | 4–4 (a.e.t.) (6–5 p) | Hertha BSC | Braunschweig |
| 18:01 CEST (UTC+2) | Nikolaou (yellow card) 40'; Behrendt 63' (pen.); Lauberbach 66'; Henning (yellow card) 82', (goal) 118'; Pherai 91', (yellow card) 93' | Report | Selke 10'; Maolida 42'; Lukebakio (yellow card) 53', (goal) 106'; Tousart (yellow card) 69', (goal) 103'; Šunjić (yellow card) 108' | Stadium: Eintracht-Stadion; Attendance: 14,126; Referee: Tobias Stieler |
| | Penalties |
| | Pherai (penalty scored); Marx (penalty scored); Nikolaou (penalty scored); Donkor (penalty missed); Behrendt (penalty scored); Krauße (penalty scored); Henning (penalty scored) | | (penalty scored) Darida; (penalty scored) Kenny; (penalty missed) Plattenhardt; (penalty scored) Jovetić; (penalty scored) Ejuke; (penalty scored) Šunjić; (penalty missed) Kempf |

== Statistics ==
=== Appearances and goals ===
| No. | Pos | Nat | Player | Total | | Bundesliga | | DFB-Pokal | |
| No. | Pos | Nat | Player | Apps | Goals | Apps | Goals | Apps | Goals |
Goalkeepers
| 1 | GK | (Denmark) DEN | Oliver Christensen | 34 | 0 | 33 | 0 | 1 | 0 |
| 12 | GK | (Germany) GER | Tjark Ernst | 1 | 0 | 1 | 0 | 0 | 0 |
| 22 | GK | (Norway) NOR | Rune Jarstein | 0 | 0 | 0 | 0 | 0 | 0 |
Defenders
| 2 | DF | (Slovakia) SVK | Peter Pekarík | 5 | 0 | 2+3 | 0 | 0 | 0 |
| 3 | DF | (Uruguay) URU | Agustín Rogel | 20 | 0 | 14+6 | 0 | 0 | 0 |
| 5 | DF | (Croatia) CRO | Filip Uremović | 22 | 0 | 21+1 | 0 | 0 | 0 |
| 16 | DF | (England) ENG | Jonjoe Kenny | 30 | 0 | 25+4 | 0 | 1 | 0 |
| 17 | DF | (Germany) GER | Maximilian Mittelstädt | 17 | 0 | 7+10 | 0 | 0 | 0 |
| 20 | DF | (Germany) GER | Marc-Oliver Kempf | 32 | 1 | 31 | 1 | 1 | 0 |
| 21 | DF | (Germany) GER | Marvin Plattenhardt | 32 | 0 | 29+2 | 0 | 1 | 0 |
| 31 | DF | (Germany) GER | Márton Dárdai | 17 | 1 | 11+6 | 1 | 0 | 0 |
| 35 | DF | (Germany) GER | Veit Stange | 1 | 0 | 0+1 | 0 | 0 | 0 |
| 41 | DF | (Germany) GER | Pascal Klemens | 1 | 0 | 1 | 0 | 0 | 0 |
| 42 | DF | (Germany) GER | Julian Eitschberger | 1 | 0 | 0+1 | 0 | 0 | 0 |
Midfielders
| 6 | MF | (Turkey) TUR | Tolga Ciğerci | 11 | 0 | 10+1 | 0 | 0 | 0 |
| 8 | MF | (Germany) GER | Suat Serdar | 33 | 4 | 24+8 | 4 | 1 | 0 |
| 10 | MF | (Netherlands) NED | Jean-Paul Boëtius | 21 | 0 | 10+11 | 0 | 0 | 0 |
| 27 | MF | (Ghana) GHA | Kevin-Prince Boateng | 17 | 0 | 5+11 | 0 | 1 | 0 |
| 29 | MF | (France) FRA | Lucas Tousart | 34 | 6 | 33 | 5 | 0+1 | 1 |
| 34 | MF | (Croatia) CRO | Ivan Šunjić | 19 | 0 | 12+6 | 0 | 1 | 0 |
Forwards
| 7 | FW | (Germany) GER | Florian Niederlechner | 16 | 1 | 11+5 | 1 | 0 | 0 |
| 14 | FW | (Belgium) BEL | Dodi Lukebakio | 33 | 12 | 27+5 | 11 | 1 | 1 |
| 18 | FW | (Ivory Coast) CIV | Wilfried Kanga | 23 | 2 | 15+8 | 2 | 0 | 0 |
| 19 | FW | (Montenegro) MNE | Stevan Jovetić | 18 | 4 | 8+9 | 4 | 0+1 | 0 |
| 23 | FW | (Germany) GER | Marco Richter | 29 | 6 | 21+8 | 6 | 0 | 0 |
| 24 | FW | (Germany) GER | Jessic Ngankam | 18 | 4 | 8+10 | 4 | 0 | 0 |
| 28 | FW | (France) FRA | Kélian Nsona | 0 | 0 | 0 | 0 | 0 | 0 |
| 30 | FW | (Germany) GER | brahim Maza | 2 | 1 | 0+2 | 1 | 0 | 0 |
| 39 | FW | (Germany) GER | Derry Scherhant | 10 | 1 | 2+8 | 1 | 0 | 0 |
| 40 | FW | (Nigeria) NGR | Chidera Ejuke | 21 | 0 | 9+11 | 0 | 0+1 | 0 |
| 44 | FW | (Germany) GER | Tony Rölke | 1 | 0 | 0+1 | 0 | 0 | 0 |
Players transferred out during the season
| | DF | (Paraguay) PAR | Omar Alderete | 0 | 0 | 0 | 0 | 0 | 0 |
| 3 | DF | (Norway) NOR | Fredrik André Bjørkan | 0 | 0 | 0 | 0 | 0 | 0 |
| 4 | DF | (Belgium) BEL | Dedryck Boyata | 1 | 0 | 0 | 0 | 1 | 0 |
| 6 | MF | (Czech Republic) CZE | Vladimír Darida | 4 | 0 | 0+3 | 0 | 0+1 | 0 |
| 7 | FW | (Germany) GER | Davie Selke | 14 | 2 | 3+10 | 1 | 1 | 1 |
| 9 | FW | (Poland) POL | Krzysztof Piątek | 0 | 0 | 0 | 0 | 0 | 0 |
| 10 | MF | (Netherlands) NED | Jurgen Ekkelenkamp | 0 | 0 | 0 | 0 | 0 | 0 |
| 11 | FW | (France) FRA | Myziane Maolida | 4 | 1 | 1+2 | 0 | 1 | 1 |
| 24 | FW | (Germany) GER | Luca Wollschläger | 0 | 0 | 0 | 0 | 0 | 0 |
| 30 | FW | (South Korea) KOR | Dong-jun Lee | 0 | 0 | 0 | 0 | 0 | 0 |
| 36 | DF | (Netherlands) NED | Deyovaisio Zeefuik | 1 | 0 | 0 | 0 | 0+1 | 0 |
| 44 | DF | (Germany) GER | Linus Gechter | 0 | 0 | 0 | 0 | 0 | 0 |

Last updated: 27 May 2023
Source: Competitions

=== Goalscorers ===
| Rank | Pos. | No. | Nat. | Player | Bundesliga | DFB-Pokal | Total |
|---|---|---|---|---|---|---|---|
| 1 | FW | 14 | (Belgium) | Dodi Lukebakio | 10 | 1 | 11 |
| 2 | MF | 8 | (Germany) | Suat Serdar | 4 | 0 | 4 |
| 2 | FW | 23 | (Germany) | Marco Richter | 4 | 0 | 4 |
| 2 | MF | 29 | (France) | Lucas Tousart | 3 | 1 | 4 |
| 5 | FW | 7 | (Germany) | Davie Selke | 1 | 1 | 2 |
| 5 | FW | 17 | (Ivory Coast) | Wilfried Kanga | 2 | 0 | 2 |
| 5 | FW | 24 | (Germany) | Jessic Ngankam | 2 | 0 | 2 |
| 8 | FW | 11 | (France) | Myziane Maolida | 0 | 1 | 1 |
| 8 | FW | 19 | (Montenegro) | Stevan Jovetić | 1 | 0 | 1 |
| 8 | DF | 31 | (Germany) | Márton Dárdai | 1 | 0 | 1 |
| 8 | FW | 39 | (Germany) | Derry Scherhant | 1 | 0 | 1 |
| Own goals | | | | | 0 | 0 | 0 |
| Totals | | | | | 29 | 4 | 33 |

Last updated: 11 March 2023
