= 2021–22 Hertha BSC season =

Hertha BSC
2021–22 season
- Chairman: Werner Gegenbauer
- Manager: Pál Dárdai (until 29 November); Tayfun Korkut (from 29 November to 13 March); Felix Magath (from 13 March)
- Stadium: Olympiastadion
- Bundesliga: 16th (play-off winners)
- DFB-Pokal: Round of 16
- Top goalscorer: League: Stevan Jovetić (6); All: Stevan Jovetić (7)
Home colours	Away colours	Third colours

The 2021–22 season was the 129th season in the existence of Hertha BSC and the club's ninth consecutive season in the top flight of German football. In addition to the domestic league, Hertha BSC participated in this season's edition of the DFB-Pokal.

== Players ==
=== First-team squad ===
As of 29 January 2022

Note: Flags indicate national team as defined under FIFA eligibility rules; some limited exceptions apply. Players may hold more than one non-FIFA nationality.

No.	Pos.	Nation	Player
1	GK	GER	Alexander Schwolow
2	DF	SVK	Peter Pekarík
3	DF	NOR	Fredrik André Bjørkan
4	DF	BEL	Dedryck Boyata (captain)
5	DF	GER	Niklas Stark (vice-captain)
6	MF	CZE	Vladimír Darida
7	FW	GER	Davie Selke
8	MF	GER	Suat Serdar
10	MF	NED	Jurgen Ekkelenkamp
11	FW	FRA	Myziane Maolida
12	GK	GER	Nils Körber
13	DF	GER	Lukas Klünter
14	FW	ALG	Ishak Belfodil
17	DF	GER	Maximilian Mittelstädt
18	MF	ARG	Santiago Ascacíbar

No.	Pos.	Nation	Player
19	FW	MNE	Stevan Jovetić
20	DF	GER	Marc-Oliver Kempf
21	DF	GER	Marvin Plattenhardt
22	GK	NOR	Rune Jarstein
23	FW	GER	Marco Richter
27	MF	GHA	Kevin-Prince Boateng
28	FW	FRA	Kélian Nsona
29	MF	FRA	Lucas Tousart
30	FW	KOR	Dong-jun Lee
31	DF	GER	Márton Dárdai
32	GK	DEN	Oliver Christensen
36	FW	SUI	Ruwen Werthmüller
40	MF	GER	Jonas Michelbrink
44	DF	GER	Linus Gechter

=== Players out on loan ===
Note: Flags indicate national team as defined under FIFA eligibility rules; some limited exceptions apply. Players may hold more than one non-FIFA nationality.

No.	Pos.	Nation	Player
—	DF	PAR	Omar Alderete (at Valencia until 30 June 2022)
—	MF	NED	Javairô Dilrosun (at Bordeaux until 30 June 2022)
—	MF	GER	Eduard Löwen (at VfL Bochum until 30 June 2022)
—	FW	BEL	Dodi Lukebakio (at VfL Wolfsburg until 30 June 2022)
—	MF	GER	Arne Maier (at FC Augsburg until 30 June 2022)
—	FW	GER	Jessic Ngankam (at Greuther Fürth until 30 June 2022)
—	FW	POL	Krzysztof Piątek (at Fiorentina until 30 June 2022)
—	FW	NED	Daishawn Redan (at PEC Zwolle until 30 June 2022)
—	DF	GER	Jordan Torunarigha (at Gent until 30 June 2022)
—	DF	NED	Deyovaisio Zeefuik (at Blackburn Rovers until 30 June 2022)

== Transfers ==
=== In ===
No.	Pos	Player	Transferred from	Fee	Date	Source
8	MF	(Germany) Suat Serdar	(Germany) Schalke 04	€8,000,000	1 July 2021	
27	MF	(Ghana) Kevin-Prince Boateng	(Italy) Monza	Free	1 July 2021	
19	FW	(Montenegro) Stevan Jovetić	AS Monaco	Free	27 July 2021	
23	FW	(Germany) Marco Richter	(Germany) FC Augsburg	€7,100,000	10 August 2021	
14	FW	(Algeria) Ishak Belfodil	(Germany) 1899 Hoffenheim	€500,000	23 August 2021	
32	GK	(Denmark) Oliver Christensen	(Denmark) Odense BK	Undisclosed	26 August 2021	
10	MF	(Netherlands) Jurgen Ekkelenkamp	(Netherlands) Ajax	€3,000,000	27 August 2021	
11	FW	(France) Myziane Maolida	(France) Nice	€4,000,000	31 August 2021	
3	DF	(Norway) Fredrik André Bjørkan	(Norway) Bodø/Glimt	Free	1 January 2022	
20	DF	(Germany) Marc-Oliver Kempf	(Germany) VfB Stuttgart	€500,000	25 January 2022	
30	FW	(South Korea) Dong-jun Lee	(South Korea) Ulsan Hyundai	€800,000	29 January 2022	
28	FW	(France) Kélian Nsona	(France) Caen	€500,000	31 January 2022	

=== Out ===
No.	Pos	Player	Transferred to	Fee	Date	Source
7	FW	(Australia) Mathew Leckie	(Australia) Melbourne City FC	Free	1 July 2021	
23	MF	(Germany) Eduard Löwen	(Germany) VfL Bochum	Loan	1 July 2021	
28	MF	(Germany) Sami Khedira		Retired	1 July 2021	
27	FW	(Germany) Jessic Ngankam	(Germany) Greuther Fürth	Loan	8 July 2021	
14	DF	(Paraguay) Omar Alderete	(Spain) Valencia	Loan	12 July 2021	
15	FW	(Colombia) Jhon Córdoba	(Russia) Krasnodar	€20,000,000	23 July 2021	
32	DF	(Germany) Luca Netz	(Germany) Borussia Mönchengladbach	€4,000,000	6 August 2021	
26	MF	(Germany) Arne Maier	(Germany) FC Augsburg	Loan	10 August 2021	
10	FW	(Brazil) Matheus Cunha	(Spain) Atlético Madrid	€30,000,000	25 August 2021	
11	FW	(Belgium) Dodi Lukebakio	(Germany) VfL Wolfsburg	Loan	30 August 2021	
16	MF	(Netherlands) Javairô Dilrosun	(France) Bordeaux	Loan	31 August 2021	
33	FW	(Netherlands) Daishawn Redan	(Netherlands) PEC Zwolle	Loan	31 August 2021	
9	FW	(Poland) Krzysztof Piątek	(Italy) Fiorentina	Loan	8 January 2022	
42	DF	(Netherlands) Deyovaisio Zeefuik	(England) Blackburn Rovers	Loan	14 January 2022	
30	FW	(Poland) Dennis Jastrzembski	(Poland) Śląsk Wrocław	Free	25 January 2022	
25	DF	(Germany) Jordan Torunarigha	(Belgium) Gent	Loan	28 January 2022	

== Pre-season and friendlies ==
Win Draw Loss Fixtures

1 July 2021 Friendly	Schwarz-Rot Neustadt (Germany)	0–16	(Germany) Hertha BSC	Hamburg, Germany
15:00 CEST (UTC+2)		Report	Tousart 6', 20'; Selke 10', 27'; Lukebakio 31'; Córdoba 46', 48', 49', 50', 62' (pen.), 70'; Kade 53'; Werthmüller 55' (pen.), 58'; Mittelstädt 77'; Michelbrink 84'	Stadium: Volksparkstadion; Attendance: 1,000

7 July 2021 Friendly	MSV Neuruppin (Germany)	0–7	(Germany) Hertha BSC	Neuruppin, Germany
16:00 CEST (UTC+2)		Report	Selke 26', 44'; Kade 51'; Lukebakio 60', 89'; Córdoba 77', 79'	Stadium: Volkspark-Stadion; Attendance: 1,000; Referee: Andy Stolz

14 July 2021 Friendly	Hertha BSC (Germany)	4–4	(Germany) Hannover 96	Berlin, Germany
17:00 CEST (UTC+2)	Selke 34', 42', 45+3' (pen.); Córdoba 82' (pen.)	Report	Ducksch 39'; Stolze 56'; Muslija 59'; Sulejmani 75'	Stadium: Stadion auf dem Wurfplatz; Attendance: 850; Referee: Florian Lechner

17 July 2021 Friendly	FC St. Pauli (Germany)	2–2	(Germany) Hertha BSC	Hamburg, Germany
16:00 CEST (UTC+2)	Kyereh 44'; Makienok 45+2'	Report	Stark 45+1'; Serdar 50'	Stadium: Millerntor-Stadion; Attendance: 2,500; Referee: Adrian Höhns

21 July 2021 Friendly	Hertha BSC (Germany)	1–1	(Germany) VfB Lübeck	Berlin, Germany
17:30 CEST (UTC+2)	Serdar 27'	Report	Ramaj 47'	Stadium: Olympiapark Hanns Braun; Attendance: 978; Referee: Daniel Siebert

28 July 2021 Friendly	Hertha BSC (Germany)	Cancelled	(Spain) Villarreal	Zell am See, Austria
18:15 CEST (UTC+2)				Stadium: Alois Latini Stadion

29 July 2021 Friendly	Hertha BSC (Germany)	4–3	(England) Liverpool	Innsbruck, Austria
20:20 CEST (UTC+2)	Ascacíbar 20'; Serdar 30'; Selke (yellow card) 45+1'; Jovetić 66', 80'	Report	Mané 36'; Minamino 42'; Konaté (yellow card) 45+1'; Gomez (yellow card) 79'; Oxlade-Chamberlain 87'	Stadium: Tivoli Stadion Tirol; Referee: Daniel Pfister

30 July 2021 Friendly	Hertha BSC (Germany)	3–2	(Saudi Arabia) Al Hilal	Zell am See, Austria
18:00 CEST (UTC+2)	Michelbrink 9'; Mittelstädt 20'; Jastrzembski 53'	Report	Marega 7'; Gomis 79'	Stadium: Alois Latini Stadion; Referee: Ramiz Begovic
Note: The match was played in two halves 40 minutes each.

31 July 2021 Friendly	Hertha BSC (Germany)	3–0	(Turkey) Gaziantep	Zell am See, Austria
18:15 CEST (UTC+2)	Selke 14'; Lukebakio 44' (pen.); Stark 55'	Report		Stadium: Alois Latini Stadion; Referee: Philipp Maier

== Competitions ==
=== Overall record ===
Competition	First match	Last match	Starting round	Final position	Record							
Competition	First match	Last match	Starting round	Final position	Pld	W	D	L	GF	GA	GD	Win %
Bundesliga	15 August 2021	14 May 2022	Matchday 1	16th	34	9	6	19	37	71	−34	26.47
Bundesliga relegation play-offs	19 May 2022	23 May 2022	First leg	Winners	2	1	0	1	2	1	+1	50.00
DFB-Pokal	8 August 2021	19 January 2022	First round	Round of 16	3	2	0	1	6	4	+2	66.67
Total					39	12	6	21	45	76	−31	30.77

Source: Soccerway

=== Bundesliga ===
==== League table ====
Pos	Team	Pld	W	D	L	GF	GA	GD	Pts	Qualification or relegation
14	FC Augsburg	34	10	8	16	39	56	−17	38	
15	VfB Stuttgart	34	7	12	15	41	59	−18	33	
16	Hertha BSC (O)	34	9	6	19	37	71	−34	33	Qualification for the relegation play-offs
17	Arminia Bielefeld (R)	34	5	13	16	27	53	−26	28	Relegation to 2. Bundesliga
18	Greuther Fürth (R)	34	3	9	22	28	82	−54	18	Relegation to 2. Bundesliga

Source: DFB
Rules for classification: 1) Points; 2) Goal difference; 3) Goals scored; 4) Head-to-head results; 5) Head-to-head away goals scored; 6) Away goals scored; 7) Play-off.
(O) Play-off winners; (R) Relegated

==== Results summary ====
Overall								Home						Away					
Pld	W	D	L	GF	GA	GD	Pts	W	D	L	GF	GA	GD	W	D	L	GF	GA	GD
34	9	6	19	37	71	−34	33	6	3	8	24	33	−9	3	3	11	13	38	−25

Source: DFB

==== Results by round ====
Round	1	2	3	4	5	6	7	8	9	10	11	12	13	14	15	16	17	18	19	20	21	22	23	24	25	26	27	28	29	30	31	32	33	34
Ground	A	H	A	A	H	A	H	A	H	A	H	A	H	A	H	A	H	H	A	H	H	A	H	A	H	A	H	A	H	A	H	A	H	A
Result	L	L	L	W	W	L	L	W	W	L	D	L	D	D	W	L	W	L	D	L	D	L	L	L	L	L	W	L	L	W	W	D	L	L
Position	15	18	18	16	9	12	14	13	10	12	13	14	14	14	14	14	11	13	13	13	14	14	15	16	16	17	16	17	17	15	15	15	15	16

Source: DFB
A = Away; H = Home; W = Win; D = Draw; L = Loss

==== Matches ====
The league fixtures were announced on 25 June 2021.

15 August 2021 1	1. FC Köln	3–1	Hertha BSC	Cologne
17:30 CEST (UTC+2)	Hübers (yellow card) 16'; Modeste 41'; Kainz 52', 55'; Czichos (yellow card) 67'; Thielmann (yellow card) 77'; Skhiri (yellow card) 80'	Report	Jovetić 5'; Plattenhardt (yellow card) 90'; Serdar (yellow card) 90+4'	Stadium: RheinEnergieStadion; Attendance: 16,500; Referee: Robert Hartmann

21 August 2021 2	Hertha BSC	1–2	VfL Wolfsburg	Berlin
15:30 CEST (UTC+2)	Boateng (yellow card) 29'; Lukebakio 60' (pen.)	Report	Mbabu (yellow card) 31'; Roussillon (yellow card) 73'; Baku 74'; Nmecha 88'	Stadium: Olympiastadion; Attendance: 18,241; Referee: Matthias Jöllenbeck

28 August 2021 3	Bayern Munich	5–0	Hertha BSC	Munich
18:30 CEST (UTC+2)	Müller 6'; Lewandowski 35', 70', 84'; Musiala 49'	Report		Stadium: Allianz Arena; Attendance: 25,000; Referee: Sven Jablonski

12 September 2021 4	VfL Bochum	1–3	Hertha BSC	Bochum
17:30 CEST (UTC+2)	Zoller 59'	Report	Serdar 37', 43'; Tousart (yellow card) 47'; Mittelstädt (yellow card) 54'; Zeefuik (yellow card) 75'; Maolida 78'	Stadium: Vonovia Ruhrstadion; Attendance: 14,000; Referee: Robert Schröder

17 September 2021 5	Hertha BSC	2–1	Greuther Fürth	Berlin
20:30 CEST (UTC+2)	Boateng (yellow card) 43'; Ekkelenkamp 61'; Bauer 79' (o.g.)	Report	Nielsen (yellow card) 51'; Hrgota 57' (pen.); Barry (yellow card) 78'	Stadium: Olympiastadion; Attendance: 20,000; Referee: Tobias Stieler

25 September 2021 6	RB Leipzig	6–0	Hertha BSC	Leipzig
15:30 CEST (UTC+2)	Nkunku 16', 70'; Poulsen 23'; Mukiele 45+4', (yellow card) 62'; Forsberg 60' (pen.); Haidara 77'	Report	Darida (yellow card) 25'; Stark (yellow card) 59'; Plattenhardt (yellow card) 85'	Stadium: Red Bull Arena; Attendance: 23,500; Referee: Sascha Stegemann

2 October 2021 7	Hertha BSC	1–2	SC Freiburg	Berlin
15:30 CEST (UTC+2)	Boateng (yellow card) 29'; Serdar (yellow card) 69'; Piątek 70'; Jastrzembski (yellow card) 90+4'	Report	Lienhart 17'; Petersen 78'	Stadium: Olympiastadion; Attendance: 18,376; Referee: Patrick Ittrich

16 October 2021 8	Eintracht Frankfurt	1–2	Hertha BSC	Frankfurt
15:30 CEST (UTC+2)	Jakić (yellow card) 29'; Paciência 78' (pen.)	Report	Richter 7', (yellow card) 40'; Ekkelenkamp 63'; Schwolow (yellow card) 90'	Stadium: Deutsche Bank Park; Attendance: 32,000; Referee: Deniz Aytekin

23 October 2021 9	Hertha BSC	1–0	Borussia Mönchengladbach	Berlin
18:30 CEST (UTC+2)	Richter 40'; Darida (yellow card) 54'; Ascacíbar (yellow card) 90+4'	Report	Beyer (yellow card) 2'; Scally (yellow card) 77'	Stadium: Olympiastadion; Attendance: 25,000; Referee: Benjamin Cortus

29 October 2021 10	1899 Hoffenheim	2–0	Hertha BSC	Sinsheim
20:30 CEST (UTC+2)	Kramarić 19'; Rudy 36'; Akpoguma (yellow card) 66'; Vogt (yellow card) 75'	Report	Ascacíbar (yellow card) 75'; Boyata (red card) 76'	Stadium: Rhein-Neckar-Arena; Attendance: 8,127; Referee: Sven Jablonski

7 November 2021 11	Hertha BSC	1–1	Bayer Leverkusen	Berlin
15:30 CET (UTC+1)	Jovetić 42'; Darida (yellow card) 64'	Report	Palacios (yellow card) 30'; Demirbay (yellow card) 58'; Diaby (yellow card) 79'; Andrich 90'	Stadium: Olympiastadion; Attendance: 22,187; Referee: Robert Hartmann

20 November 2021 12	Union Berlin	2–0	Hertha BSC	Berlin
18:30 CET (UTC+1)	Awoniyi 8'; Trimmel 30'; Prömel (yellow card) 66'	Report	Serdar (yellow card) 38'	Stadium: Stadion An der Alten Försterei; Attendance: 22,012; Referee: Felix Brych

27 November 2021 13	Hertha BSC	1–1	FC Augsburg	Berlin
15:30 CET (UTC+1)	Richter 40', (yellow card) 42'; Jovetić (yellow card) 90+6'	Report	Vargas (yellow card) 31'; Hahn (yellow card) 81'; Iago (yellow card) 90+6'; Gregoritsch 90+7'	Stadium: Olympiastadion; Attendance: 14,523; Referee: Frank Willenborg

5 December 2021 14	VfB Stuttgart	2–2	Hertha BSC	Stuttgart
15:30 CET (UTC+1)	Marmoush 15'; Förster 19'	Report	Jovetić 40', 76'; Boateng (yellow card) 90+1'	Stadium: Mercedes-Benz Arena; Attendance: 395; Referee: Benjamin Brand

11 December 2021 15	Hertha BSC	2–0	Arminia Bielefeld	Berlin
15:30 CET (UTC+1)	Darida (yellow card) 15'; Jovetić 52'; Selke 90+5'	Report	Brunner (yellow card) 88'	Stadium: Olympiastadion; Attendance: 5,000; Referee: Tobias Welz

14 December 2021 16	Mainz 05	4–0	Hertha BSC	Mainz
20:30 CET (UTC+1)	Lee 19'; Hack 41'; Widmer 49'; Boëtius 79'	Report	Serdar (yellow card) 36'; Stark (yellow card) 59'	Stadium: Opel Arena; Attendance: 10,000; Referee: Harm Osmers

18 December 2021 17	Hertha BSC	3–2	Borussia Dortmund	Berlin
18:30 CET (UTC+1)	Belfodil 51'; Richter 57', 69'	Report	Brandt 31'; Tigges 83'; Pongračić (yellow card) 90+5'	Stadium: Olympiastadion; Attendance: 5,000; Referee: Marco Fritz

9 January 2022 18	Hertha BSC	1–3	1. FC Köln	Berlin
15:30 CET (UTC+1)	Torunarigha (yellow card) 48'; Darida 57'; Serdar (yellow card) 61'; Boateng (yellow card) 82'	Report	Hübers (yellow card) 15'; Modeste 29'; Duda 32'; Thielmann 90+1'	Stadium: Olympiastadion; Attendance: 3,000; Referee: Tobias Stieler

15 January 2022 19	VfL Wolfsburg	0–0	Hertha BSC	Wolfsburg
15:30 CET (UTC+1)	Steffen (yellow card) 39'	Report	Klünter (yellow card) 57'	Stadium: Volkswagen Arena; Attendance: 500; Referee: Robert Hartmann

23 January 2022 20	Hertha BSC	1–4	Bayern Munich	Berlin
17:30 CET (UTC+1)	Serdar (yellow card) 70'; Ekkelenkamp 81'	Report	Tolisso 25'; Müller 45'; Sané 75'; Gnabry 79'	Stadium: Olympiastadion; Attendance: 3,000; Referee: Bastian Dankert

4 February 2022 21	Hertha BSC	1–1	VfL Bochum	Berlin
20:30 CET (UTC+1)	Belfodil 23'; Ekkelenkamp (yellow card) 56'; Mittelstädt (yellow card) 84'; Richter (yellow card) 86'	Report	Polter 48'; Bella-Kotchap (yellow card) 85'	Stadium: Olympiastadion; Attendance: 3,000; Referee: Marco Fritz

12 February 2022 22	Greuther Fürth	2–1	Hertha BSC	Fürth
15:30 CET (UTC+1)	Hrgota 1', 71' (pen.); Itter (yellow card) 34'; Dudziak (yellow card) 49'	Report	Stark (yellow card) 22'; Belfodil (yellow card) 29'; Jovetić (yellow card) 76'; Tousart (yellow card) 78'; Gechter 82'	Stadium: Sportpark Ronhof; Attendance: 7,919; Referee: Daniel Schlager

20 February 2022 23	Hertha BSC	1–6	RB Leipzig	Berlin
19:30 CET (UTC+1)	Richter (yellow card) 25'; Jovetić 48'; Kempf (red card) 62'; Ascacíbar (yellow card) 84'	Report	Henrichs 20'; Gvardiol (yellow card) 34'; Nkunku 64' (pen.), 67', (yellow card) 64'; Olmo 75'; Haidara 82', (yellow card) 85'; Poulsen 89'	Stadium: Olympiastadion; Attendance: 10,000; Referee: Patrick Ittrich

26 February 2022 24	SC Freiburg	3–0	Hertha BSC	Freiburg
15:30 CET (UTC+1)	Grifo 12' (pen.); Höfler (yellow card) 21'; Schade 83'; Höler 86'	Report	Jovetić (yellow card) 24'; Bjørkan (yellow card) 74'	Stadium: Europa-Park Stadion; Attendance: 25,000; Referee: Sven Jablonski

5 March 2022 25	Hertha BSC	1–4	Eintracht Frankfurt	Berlin
15:30 CET (UTC+1)	Boateng (yellow card) 61'; Selke 61'; Mittelstädt (yellow card) 73'	Report	Knauff 17'; Tuta 48'; Lindstrøm 56'; Borré 63'; Hauge (yellow card) 73'; Lammers (yellow card) 84'	Stadium: Olympiastadion; Attendance: 25,000; Referee: Harm Osmers

12 March 2022 26	Borussia Mönchengladbach	2–0	Hertha BSC	Mönchengladbach
18:30 CET (UTC+1)	Pléa 24' (pen.); Ginter (yellow card) 56', (goal) 59'; Scally (yellow card) 81'; Thuram (yellow card) 89'	Report		Stadium: Borussia-Park; Attendance: 30,675; Referee: Florian Badstübner

19 March 2022 27	Hertha BSC	3–0	1899 Hoffenheim	Berlin
15:30 CET (UTC+1)	Stark 39'; Pekarík (yellow card) 50'; Belfodil 63'; Tousart 74'; Dárdai (yellow card) 90+2'	Report	Akpoguma (yellow card) 55'	Stadium: Olympiastadion; Attendance: 25,000; Referee: Daniel Schlager

2 April 2022 28	Bayer Leverkusen	2–1	Hertha BSC	Leverkusen
15:30 CEST (UTC+2)	Alario 35'; Bellarabi 40'	Report	Boateng (yellow card) 41'; Darida 42'	Stadium: BayArena; Attendance: 23,557; Referee: Matthias Jöllenbeck

9 April 2022 29	Hertha BSC	1–4	Union Berlin	Berlin
18:30 CEST (UTC+2)	Lotka (yellow card) 13'; Jovetić (yellow card) 20'; Baumgartl 49' (o.g.); Kempf (yellow card) 61'; Tousart (yellow card) 65'	Report	Haraguchi 31'; Prömel 53'; Becker 74'; Michel 85'	Stadium: Olympiastadion; Attendance: 74,667; Referee: Sven Jablonski

16 April 2022 30	FC Augsburg	0–1	Hertha BSC	Augsburg
15:30 CEST (UTC+2)	Oxford (yellow card) 26'; Gumny (yellow card) 52'; Framberger (yellow card) 90'; Gouweleeuw (yellow card) 90+6'	Report	Selke (yellow card) 26'; Boateng (yellow card) 29'; Boyata (yellow card) 34'; Serdar 49'; Richter (yellow card) 64'	Stadium: WWK Arena; Attendance: 28,533; Referee: Marco Fritz

24 April 2022 31	Hertha BSC	2–0	VfB Stuttgart	Berlin
17:30 CEST (UTC+2)	Selke 4'; Darida (yellow card) 64'; Belfodil 90+3'	Report	Endo (yellow card) 41'	Stadium: Olympiastadion; Attendance: 54,589; Referee: Felix Brych

30 April 2022 32	Arminia Bielefeld	1–1	Hertha BSC	Bielefeld
15:30 CEST (UTC+2)	De Medina (yellow card) 34'; Wimmer (yellow card) 65'; Kunze (yellow card) 84'; Nilsson 90+1'	Report	Tousart 54'; Richter (yellow card) 75'	Stadium: Bielefelder Alm; Attendance: 26,021; Referee: Deniz Aytekin

7 May 2022 33	Hertha BSC	1–2	Mainz 05	Berlin
18:30 CEST (UTC+2)	Selke 45+5' (pen.); Dárdai (yellow card) 56'; Darida (yellow card) 80'; Ascacíbar (yellow card) 88'	Report	Widmer 25'; Martín (yellow card) 65'; Bell 81'	Stadium: Olympiastadion; Attendance: 71,548; Referee: Patrick Ittrich

14 May 2022 34	Borussia Dortmund	2–1	Hertha BSC	Dortmund
15:30 CEST (UTC+2)	Haaland 68' (pen.); Moukoko 84'	Report	Belfodil 18' (pen.); Ascacíbar (yellow card) 66'; Plattenhardt (yellow card) 66'	Stadium: Signal Iduna Park; Attendance: 80,500; Referee: Tobias Stieler

==== Relegation play-offs ====
As a result of their 16th-place finish in the regular season, the club qualified for the play-off match with the third-place team in the 2021–22 2. Bundesliga, Hamburger SV, to determine whether the club would remain in the 2022–23 Bundesliga.

19 May 2022 First leg	Hertha BSC	0–1	Hamburger SV	Berlin
20:30 CEST (UTC+2)	Stark (yellow card) 29'; Tousart (yellow card) 30'; Boyata (yellow card) 49'	Report	Reis 57'	Stadium: Olympiastadion; Attendance: 75,500; Referee: Harm Osmers

23 May 2022 Second leg	Hamburger SV	0–2 (1–2 agg.)	Hertha BSC	Hamburg
20:30 CEST (UTC+2)		Report	Boyata 4'; Boateng (yellow card) 31'; Jovetić (yellow card) 37'; Plattenhardt 63'; Tousart (yellow card) 83' (yellow-red card) 90+6'	Stadium: Volksparkstadion; Attendance: 57,000; Referee: Deniz Aytekin

=== DFB-Pokal ===
8 August 2021 First round	SV Meppen	0–1	Hertha BSC	Meppen
15:30 CEST (UTC+2)	Hemlein (yellow card) 52'; Al-Hazaimeh (yellow card) 84'	Report	Ascacíbar (yellow card) 31'; Boateng (yellow card) 35'; Selke (yellow card) 84', (goal) 90+1'; Serdar (yellow card) 90'	Stadium: Hänsch-Arena; Attendance: 6,000; Referee: Robert Kampka

26 October 2021 Second round	Preußen Münster	1–3	Hertha BSC	Münster
18:30 CEST (UTC+2)	Remberg (yellow card) 36' (yellow-red card) 45+1'; Deters 41'; Schauerte (yellow card) 56'; Langlitz (yellow card) 62'; Klann (yellow card) 68'; Ziegele (yellow card) 90+2'	Report	Jovetić 3'; Ekkelenkamp (yellow card) 46'; Belfodil (yellow card) 74', (goal) 79'; Richter 83'	Stadium: Preußenstadion; Attendance: 11,037; Referee: Frank Willenborg

19 January 2022 Round of 16	Hertha BSC	2–3	Union Berlin	Berlin
20:45 CET (UTC+1)	Serdar (yellow card) 16', (goal) 90+5'; Khedira 54' (o.g.)	Report	Voglsammer 11'; Öztunalı (yellow card) 43'; Stark 50' (o.g.); Knoche 55'	Stadium: Olympiastadion; Attendance: 3,000; Referee: Deniz Aytekin

== Statistics ==
=== Appearances and goals ===
No.	Pos	Nat	Player	Total		Bundesliga		DFB-Pokal		Relegation play-offs	
No.	Pos	Nat	Player	Apps	Goals	Apps	Goals	Apps	Goals	Apps	Goals
Goalkeepers
1	GK	(Germany) GER	Alexander Schwolow	28	0	25	0	3	0	0	0
12	GK	(Germany) GER	Nils Körber	0	0	0	0	0	0	0	0
22	GK	(Norway) NOR	Rune Jarstein	0	0	0	0	0	0	0	0
32	GK	(Denmark) DEN	Oliver Christensen	2	0	0	0	0	0	2	0
37	GK	(Poland) POL	Marcel Lotka	10	0	9+1	0	0	0	0	0
Defenders
2	DF	(Slovakia) SVK	Peter Pekarík	31	0	26+1	0	1+1	0	2	0
3	DF	(Norway) NOR	Fredrik André Bjørkan	10	0	2+7	0	0	0	0+1	0
4	DF	(Belgium) BEL	Dedryck Boyata	27	1	22+1	0	2	0	2	1
5	DF	(Germany) GER	Niklas Stark	30	1	22+4	1	2	0	1+1	0
13	DF	(Germany) GER	Lukas Klünter	6	0	2+3	0	1	0	0	0
17	DF	(Germany) GER	Maximilian Mittelstädt	26	0	16+8	0	1	0	1	0
20	DF	(Germany) GER	Marc-Oliver Kempf	14	0	12	0	0	0	2	0
21	DF	(Germany) GER	Marvin Plattenhardt	25	1	18+3	0	2	0	2	1
31	DF	(Germany) GER	Márton Dárdai	13	0	9+3	0	1	0	0	0
34	DF	(Germany) GER	Cimo Röcker	1	0	0+1	0	0	0	0	0
42	DF	(Germany) GER	Julian Eitschberger	1	0	1	0	0	0	0	0
44	DF	(Germany) GER	Linus Gechter	16	1	6+7	1	1+1	0	0+1	0
Midfielders
6	MF	(Czech Republic) CZE	Vladimír Darida	29	2	23+2	2	2+1	0	0+1	0
8	DF	(Germany) GER	Suat Serdar	35	4	27+3	3	2+1	1	2	0
10	MF	(Netherlands) NED	Jurgen Ekkelenkamp	22	3	6+15	3	1	0	0	0
18	MF	(Argentina) ARG	Santiago Ascacíbar	31	0	27+1	0	2	0	1	0
27	MF	(Ghana) GHA	Kevin-Prince Boateng	21	0	8+10	0	1+1	0	1	0
29	MF	(France) FRA	Lucas Tousart	34	2	22+7	2	2+1	0	2	0
39	MF	(Germany) GER	Julian Albrecht	0	0	0	0	0	0	0	0
40	MF	(Germany) GER	Jonas Michelbrink	0	0	0	0	0	0	0	0
41	MF	(Germany) GER	Jonas Dirkner	0	0	0	0	0	0	0	0
Forwards
7	FW	(Germany) GER	Davie Selke	28	5	10+15	4	2+1	1	0	0
11	FW	(France) FRA	Myziane Maolida	18	1	9+5	1	0+2	0	0+2	0
14	FW	(Algeria) ALG	Ishak Belfodil	30	6	17+9	5	1+1	1	2	0
19	FW	(Montenegro) MNE	Stevan Jovetić	22	7	13+5	6	2	1	1+1	0
24	FW	(Germany) GER	Luca Wollschläger	3	0	0+2	0	0	0	1	0
23	FW	(Germany) GER	Marco Richter	33	6	19+11	5	1+1	1	0+1	0
28	FW	(France) FRA	Kélian Nsona	0	0	0	0	0	0	0	0
30	FW	(South Korea) KOR	Dong-jun Lee	4	0	1+3	0	0	0	0	0
35	FW	(Germany) GER	Marten Winkler	1	0	0+1	0	0	0	0	0
36	FW	(Switzerland) SUI	Ruwen Werthmüller	0	0	0	0	0	0	0	0
46	FW	(Germany) GER	Anton Kade	4	0	0+4	0	0	0	0	0
Players transferred out during the season
9	FW	(Poland) POL	Krzysztof Piątek	10	1	4+5	1	0+1	0	0	0
10	FW	(Brazil) BRA	Matheus Cunha	1	0	1	0	0	0	0	0
11	FW	(Belgium) BEL	Dodi Lukebakio	4	1	2+1	1	1	0	0	0
16	MF	(Netherlands) NED	Javairô Dilrosun	3	0	1+1	0	0+1	0	0	0
25	DF	(Germany) GER	Jordan Torunarigha	7	0	6+1	0	0	0	0	0
26	MF	(Germany) GER	Arne Maier	0	0	0	0	0	0	0	0
30	FW	(Poland) POL	Dennis Jastrzembski	10	0	1+7	0	1+1	0	0	0
33	FW	(Netherlands) NED	Daishawn Redan	0	0	0	0	0	0	0	0
42	DF	(Netherlands) NED	Deyovaisio Zeefuik	12	0	6+5	0	1	0	0	0

Last updated: 23 May 2022
Source: Competitions

=== Goalscorers ===
Rank	Pos	No.	Nat	Name	Bundesliga	DFB-Pokal	Relegation play-offs	Total
1	FW	19	(Montenegro)	Stevan Jovetić	6	1	0	7
2	FW	14	(Algeria)	Ishak Belfodil	5	1	0	6
2	FW	23	(Germany)	Marco Richter	5	1	0	6
4	FW	7	(Germany)	Davie Selke	4	1	0	5
5	MF	8	(Germany)	Suat Serdar	3	1	0	4
6	MF	10	(Netherlands)	Jurgen Ekkelenkamp	3	0	0	3
7	MF	6	(Czech Republic)	Vladimír Darida	2	0	0	2
7	MF	29	(France)	Lucas Tousart	2	0	0	2
9	DF	4	(Belgium)	Dedryck Boyata	0	0	1	1
9	DF	5	(Germany)	Niklas Stark	1	0	0	1
9	FW	9	(Poland)	Krzysztof Piątek	1	0	0	1
9	FW	11	(Belgium)	Dodi Lukebakio	1	0	0	1
9	FW	11	(France)	Myziane Maolida	1	0	0	1
9	DF	21	(Germany)	Marvin Plattenhardt	0	0	1	1
9	DF	44	(Germany)	Linus Gechter	1	0	0	1
Own goals					2	1	0	3
Totals					37	6	2	45

Last updated: 23 May 2022
