= Oliver Christensen =

Danish footballer (born 1999)

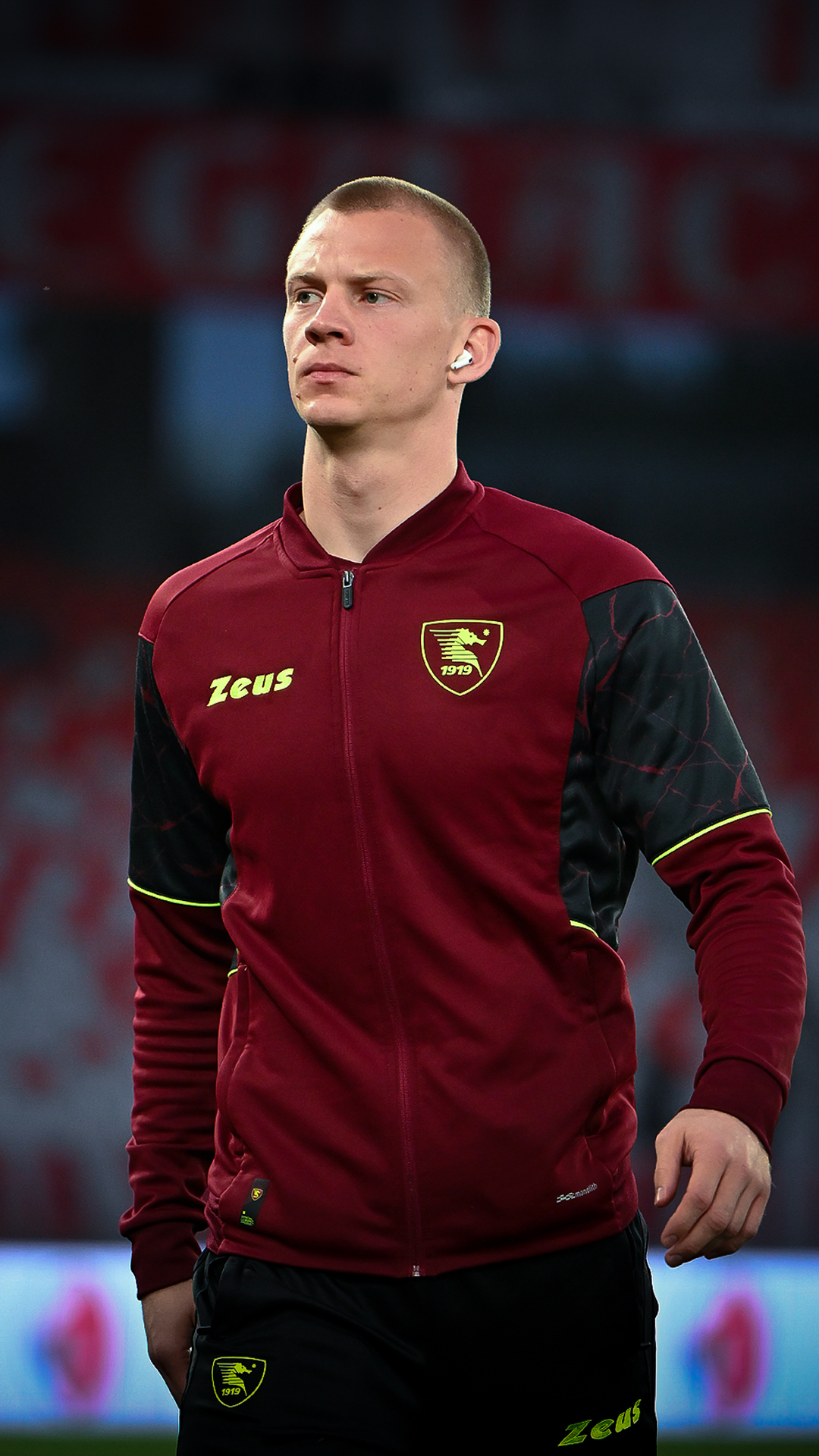
- Christensen with Salernitana in 2025

Personal information
- Full name: Oliver Christensen
- Date of birth: 22 March 1999 (age 27)
- Place of birth: Kerteminde, Denmark
- Height: 1.90 m (6 ft 3 in)
- Position: Goalkeeper

Team information
- Current team: Fiorentina
- Number: 53

Youth career
- –2010: Kerteminde Boldklub
- 2010–2018: OB

Senior career*
Years	Team	Apps	(Gls)
2016–2021	OB	61	(0)
2021–2022	Hertha BSC II	5	(0)
2021–2023	Hertha BSC	35	(0)
2023–	Fiorentina	5	(0)
2025	→ Salernitana (loan)	16	(0)
2025	→ Sturm Graz (loan)	15	(0)

International career^{‡}
2017	Denmark U18	2	(0)
2017–2018	Denmark U19	2	(0)
2019	Denmark U20	1	(0)
2019–2021	Denmark U21	14	(0)
2020	Denmark	1	(0)
- * Club domestic league appearances and goals as of 09:12, 23 May 2026 (UTC) ‡ National team caps and goals as of 4 May 2021

Oliver Christensen (born 22 March 1999) is a Danish professional footballer who plays as a goalkeeper for Serie A club Fiorentina.

== Club career ==
=== OB ===
Born in Kerteminde on the island of Funen, Christensen played in the youth department of his local club, Kerteminde Boldklub, before moving to Odense Boldklub (OB) at under-12 level. There, he progressed through the academy, and completed a trial with Manchester United in October 2016.

In May 2017, Christensen signed a three-year professional contract with OB, and was promoted to the first team. Thus, he became a part of the club until 2020. In the first year of his contract, he still attended classes, after which he would become a full-time professional from the summer of 2018.

He made his professional debut on 22 October 2018 in a Danish Superliga match against Brøndby IF. He impressed during the match, fending off a number of shots on goal from opposing players. He since became established as the starting goalkeeper for OB, gaining the nickname Gribben fra Kerteminde, meaning "the vulture from Kerteminde" due to his large wingspan.

=== Hertha BSC ===
On 26 August 2021, Christensen was sold to Bundesliga club Hertha BSC, where he signed a deal until June 2026. On 5 November, he made his debut for the reserve team Hertha BSC II in the Regionalliga Nordost game against 1. FC Lokomotive Leipzig. During the 2021–22 season he did not make any Bundesliga appearance, as Alexander Schwolow and Marcel Lotka were given preference. Hertha finished the season in 16th place in the table and would thus meet Hamburger SV in playoffs for relegation and promotion. Since Lotka and Schwolow were injured, Christensen played both games and was able to keep Hertha in the Bundesliga.

=== Fiorentina ===
On 10 August 2023, Christensen signed with Italian club Fiorentina, initially as a backup to goalkeeper Pietro Terracciano. He made his competitive debut on 27 August in a 2–2 draw against Lecce. Although he started the following match against Inter Milan, his appearances were mainly in the UEFA Conference League, where he played four of the six group stage matches. Christensen also made key contributions in the Coppa Italia, performing strongly in both the round of 16 against Parma and the quarter-finals against Bologna. However, an injury limited his season to just two Serie A matches, with ten appearances overall across all competitions.

In his second season, following the arrival of David de Gea, Christensen became the fourth-choice goalkeeper and was left entirely out of the squad by new head coach Raffaele Palladino.

==== Loan to Salernitana ====
On 22 January 2025, Christensen was loaned to Serie B club Salernitana for the remainder of the season.

==== Loan to Sturm Graz ====
On 2 August 2025, Christensen moved on loan to Sturm Graz in Austria until the end of 2025.

== International career ==
Christensen played two games each for the Denmark under-18 team in 2017 and for the under-19 team in 2017 and 2018, respectively. After gaining a cap for the under-20 side in 2019, Christensen made his debut for the under-21 team on 10 September 2019 in a 2–1 victory in the 2021 UEFA European Under-21 Championship qualification match against Romania in Aalborg.

On 9 November 2020, Christensen was called up to Kasper Hjulmand's senior squad for the friendly against Sweden due to several cancellations from, among others, the Danish national team players playing in England, due to the COVID-19 restrictions, as well as a case of COVID-19 in the squad, which had put several national team players in quarantine. He started the match against Sweden at Brøndby Stadium in his debut match, on 11 November 2020.

== Career statistics ==
=== Club ===
As of match played 22 May 2026

Appearances and goals by club, season and competition
Club	Season	League			National cup (Note: Includes Danish Cup, DFB-Pokal, Coppa Italia, Austrian Cup)		Europe		Other		Total	
Club	Season	Division	Apps	Goals	Apps	Goals	Apps	Goals	Apps	Goals	Apps	Goals
OB	2018–19	Danish Superliga	1	0	2	0	—		—		3	0
OB	2019–20	Danish Superliga	29	0	0	0	—		5 (Note: Appearances in Danish Superliga European play-offs)	0	15	0
OB	2020–21	Danish Superliga	25	0	3	0	—		—		28	0
OB	2021–22	Danish Superliga	6	0	0	0	—		—		6	0
OB	Total		61	0	5	0	—		5	0	71	0
Hertha BSC II	2021–22	Regionalliga Nordost	5	0	—		—		—		5	0
Hertha BSC	2021–22	Bundesliga	0	0	0	0	—		2 (Note: Appearances in Bundesliga promotion/relegation play-offs)	0	2	0
Hertha BSC	2022–23	Bundesliga	33	0	1	0	—		—		34	0
Hertha BSC	2023–24	2. Bundesliga	2	0	0	0	—		—		2	0
Hertha BSC	Total		35	0	1	0	—		2	0	38	0
Fiorentina	2023–24	Serie A	4	0	2	0	4 (Note: Appearances in UEFA Europa Conference League)	0	—		10	0
Fiorentina	2025–26	Serie A	1	0	1	0	2 (Note: Appearances in UEFA Conference League)	0	—		4	0
Fiorentina	2026–27	Serie A	0	0	0	0	—		—		0	0
Fiorentina	Total		5	0	3	0	6	0	—		14	0
Salernitana (loan)	2024–25	Serie B	16	0	—		—		2 (Note: Appearances in Serie B promotion play-offs)	0	18	0
Sturm Graz (loan)	2025–26	Austrian Bundesliga	15	0	1	0	7 (Note: Two appearances in UEFA Champions League, five appearances in UEFA Europa League)	0	—		23	0
Career total			137	0	10	0	13	0	9	0	169	0

=== International ===
As of match played 11 November 2020

Appearances and goals by national team and year
National team	Year	Apps	Goals
Denmark	2020	1	0
Total		1	0
