= Davie Selke =

German footballer (born 1995)

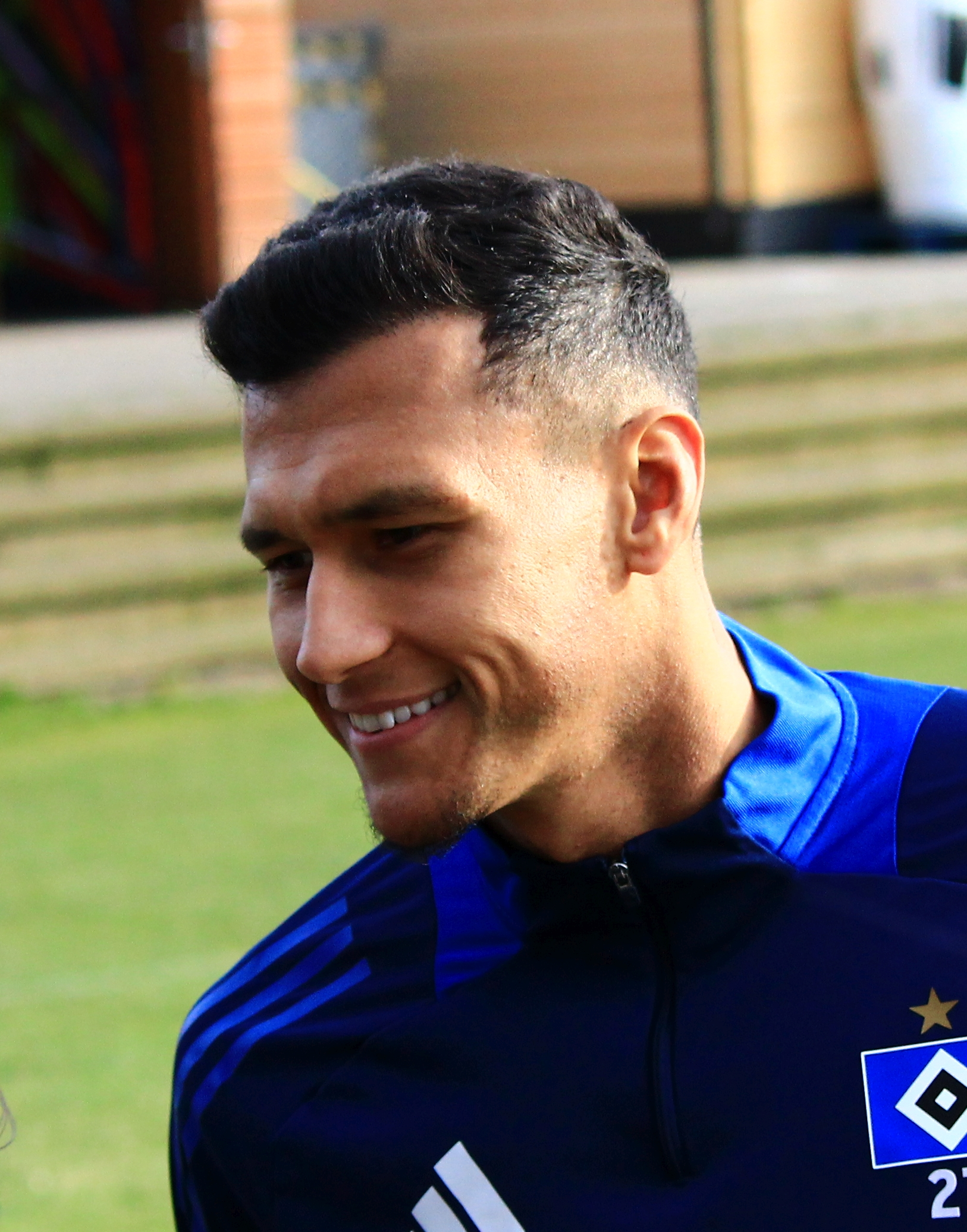
- Selke with Hamburger SV in 2025

Personal information
- Date of birth: 20 January 1995 (age 31)
- Place of birth: Schorndorf, Germany
- Height: 1.95 m (6 ft 5 in)
- Position: Striker

Team information
- Current team: İstanbul Başakşehir
- Number: 9

Youth career
- Stuttgarter Kickers
- VfB Stuttgart
- –2009: Normannia Gmünd
- 2009–2012: TSG Hoffenheim
- 2013: Werder Bremen

Senior career*
Years	Team	Apps	(Gls)
2013–2015	Werder Bremen	33	(9)
2015–2017	RB Leipzig	51	(14)
2017–2023	Hertha BSC	114	(19)
2020–2021	→ Werder Bremen (loan)	34	(3)
2023–2024	1. FC Köln	36	(11)
2024–2025	Hamburger SV	31	(22)
2025–	İstanbul Başakşehir	25	(10)

International career^{‡}
2011	Germany U16	1	(0)
2011	Germany U17	5	(2)
2012–2013	Germany U18	7	(4)
2013–2014	Germany U19	15	(14)
2014–2015	Germany U20	3	(1)
2015–2017	Germany U21	15	(9)
2016	Germany Olympic	5	(2)
Medal record
Men's football
Representing Germany
Olympic Games
Silver medal – second place	2016 Rio	Team
European Under-19 Championship
Winner	2014 Hungary	Team
European Under-21 Championship
Winner	2017 Poland	Team
- * Club domestic league appearances and goals as of 1 July 2025 ‡ National team caps and goals as of 19:40, 20 December 2023 (UTC)

Davie Selke (German pronunciation: [ˈzɛlkə]; born 20 January 1995) is a German professional footballer who plays as a striker for Süper Lig club İstanbul Başakşehir.

Selke began his professional career with Werder Bremen in 2013 where he went on to score 10 goals in 36 appearances before signing for RB Leipzig in 2015 for a 2. Bundesliga record fee of €8 million. He spent two seasons with Leipzig, helping the club earn promotion to the Bundesliga for the first time in 2016 and qualification to the UEFA Champions League the following year. Having scored 14 goals in 51 appearances, Selke then joined Hertha BSC in June 2017.

He has also represented Germany at all youth levels and in 2014 was part of the squad which won the 2014 UEFA European Under-19 Championship, earning the Golden Boot and Golden Player awards for his performances at the tournament. Two years later, he featured at the 2016 Summer Olympics where Germany earned a silver medal, losing out to hosts Brazil in the final. The following year he helped his nation claim the UEFA European Under-21 Championship title.

== Club career ==
=== Werder Bremen ===
Having spent the majority of his youth years at TSG Hoffenheim, Selke signed for Werder Bremen in 2013 for €50,000. While spending most of the 2013–2014 season playing for the reserves in the fourth-tier Regionalliga Nord, he made his first-team debut for the club on 3 November 2013, coming on as a second-half substitute for Clemens Fritz in a 3–2 Bundesliga victory over Hannover 96. The following month, Selke exchanged blows with Fritz during a training session, with the pair having to be separated by teammates. He ended the season having scored 9 goals in 26 appearances for the reserves and remaining goalless in three first-team appearances for Die Grün-Weißen.

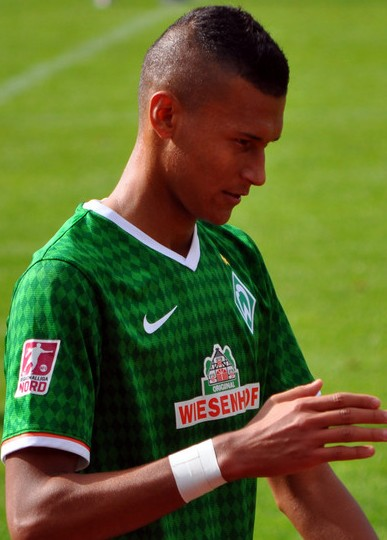
Selke started his career at Werder Bremen in 2013 and went on to score nine goals in 33 league appearances for the club.

At the start of the 2014–15 campaign, Selke signed a new four-year deal with Bremen, tying him to the club until 2018. He scored his first goal on 20 September 2014, netting in a 4–2 Bundesliga loss against FC Augsburg. A late flurry of four goals and four assists in nine games from Selke helped Bremen to a tenth-placed finish in the league, thus securing their status in the Bundesliga for another season. He finished the season with 10 goals in 33 appearances in all competitions.

Despite having signed a contract extension with Bremen a few months prior, Selke announced on 1 April 2015 that he would be joining then 2. Bundesliga side RB Leipzig at the end of the season. The €8m fee Leipzig paid for Selke made him the most expensive 2. Bundesliga signing in the history of the competition. With Selke having been courted throughout the season by a host of European clubs, including Real Madrid, his decision to drop down a division was seen as being financially motivated. This was especially the case given Leipzig's relationship with energy drink company, Red Bull. Following the announcement of his departure, Selke was jeered by parts of the Werder Bremen fan base during the remaining matches of the season. He ultimately scored 10 goals in 36 appearances for the club.

=== RB Leipzig ===
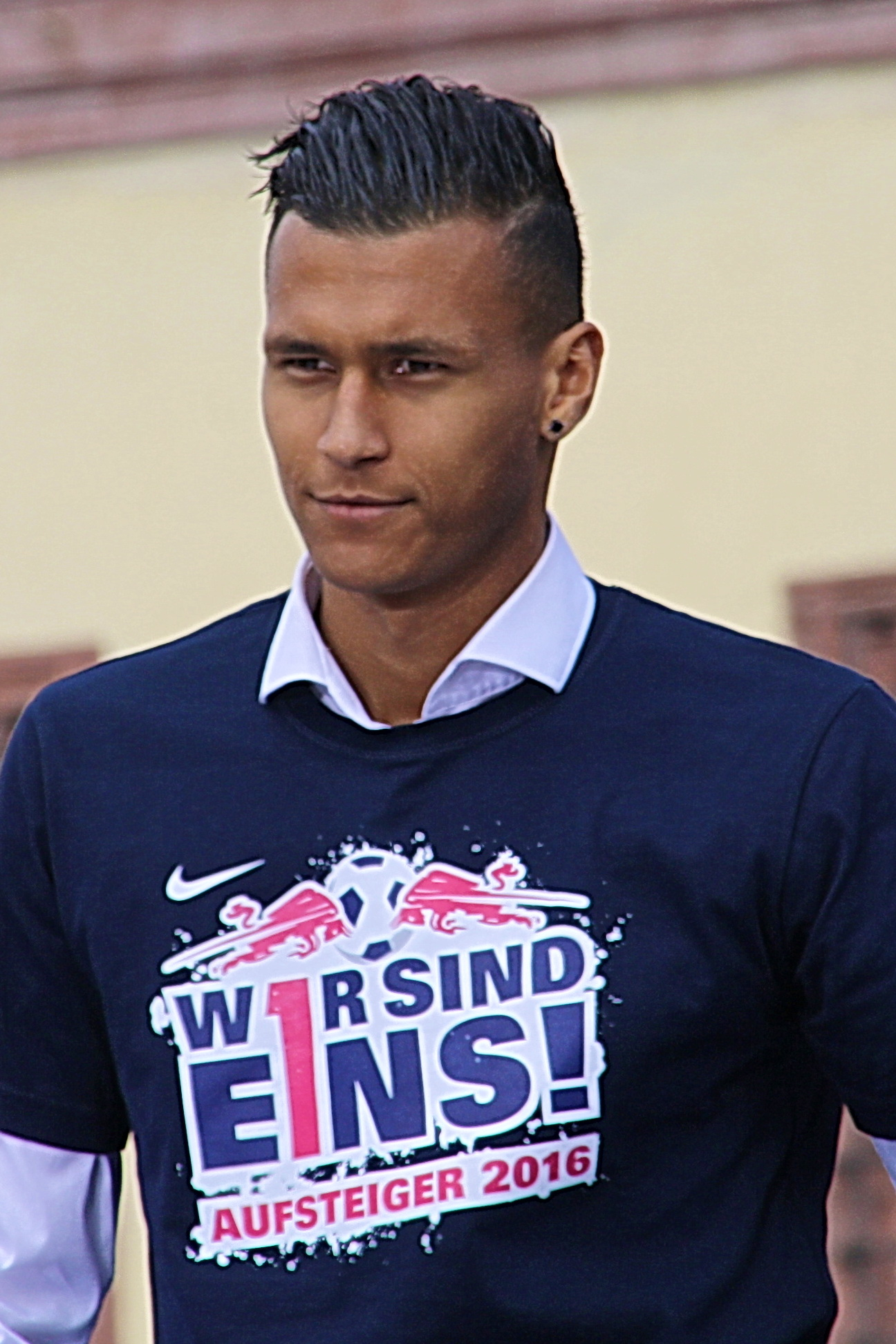
Selke became the most expensive player in 2. Bundesliga history when he signed for RB Leipzig in 2015.

Selke made his debut for RB Leipzig on 25 July 2015 against FSV Frankfurt and scored his first goal for the club the following week, netting in a 2–2 draw with Greuther Fürth. On 21 November, Selke netted the only goal in a 1–0 win over Arminia Bielefeld which saw Leipzig climb to the summit of 2.Liga. On 8 May, Die roten Bullen secured promotion with a match to spare after beating Karlsruher SC 2–0. It was the first time in the club's short history that they had been promoted to the Bundesliga. During the post match celebrations, Leipzig manager Ralf Rangnick pulled his hamstring after being chased by Selke with a glass of beer. He finished the 2015–16 season with 10 goals in 32 appearances.

Selke scored his first goal for the 2016–17 Bundesliga season on matchday three, scoring one and assisting another in a 3–1 win over Hamburg. On matchday 32, he netted a brace in a 4–1 win over Hertha BSC which saw the Leipzig qualify for the Champions League for the first time in the club's history. He struggled for first-team football throughout the season, however, and started in just four out of 20 appearances for the campaign, scoring four goals.

=== Hertha BSC ===
On 1 June 2017, Hertha BSC confirmed the signing of Selke on a long-term deal for a reported club record fee of €8.5m. The following month, Selke suffered a metatarsal injury in training which was later diagnosed to be a bone-marrow edema, and was ruled out for a number of weeks. He eventually made his first league appearance for Hertha on matchday eight, coming off the bench in a 2–0 loss to Schalke 04. He scored his first goal for the club four days later, netting in a 2–1 Europa League defeat to Zorya. On 5 November, he scored his first league goal, netting in a 3–3 draw with Wolfsburg.

The following month, Selke came up against RB Leipzig for the first time since joining Hertha BSC and prior to the match he vowed to celebrate if he scored against his former club. He proceeded to score twice to lead Hertha to a 3–2 win despite his side being down to ten men after Jordan Torunarigha was sent off in the eighth minute. On 14 March 2018, following a run of three months without a goal, Selke netted another brace in a 2–1 win over Köln, the second of which was the 1000th home goal scored in the Bundesliga by Hertha. His return to goal scoring form continued with Selke enjoying a run of five goals in four matches during the final stages of the season to end the campaign with a return of 10 goals in 27 appearances.

In July 2018, Selke suffered a collapsed lung which ruled him out of the start of the 2018–19 season. Following a successful recovery, he featured regularly under manager Pal Dardai and by February 2019, despite having only scored four goals, had recorded eight assists in the league; more than he had in each of his previous campaigns combined. The following month, he made his 50th league appearance for the club during a 3–2 defeat to Borussia Dortmund.

==== Loan to Werder ====
On 31 January 2020, the last day of the 2019–20 winter transfer period, Selke re-joined Werder Bremen on a loan deal lasting until the summer of 2021. The transfer reportedly includes an obligation for Werder Bremen to sign him permanently at the end of the loan for an estimated transfer fee between €10 and 15 million, which only takes effect if the club remains in the Bundesliga. Due to Werder Bremen's relegation to the 2. Bundesliga the club did not sign Selke permanently.

==== Return to Hertha ====
Ahead of the 2021–22 season, Selke returned to Hertha BSC, where he played under coaches Pál Dárdai, Tayfun Korkut and Felix Magath. On 30 April 2022, a 1–1 league draw against Arminia Bielefeld, Selke played his 100th Bundesliga match for Hertha BSC. In 25 league appearances that season, he was in the starting eleven 10 times and scored 4 goals.

=== 1. FC Köln ===
On 2 January 2023, Selke signed for 1. FC Köln on an eighteen month contract. He departed the club following their relegation by the end of the 2023–24 season.

=== Hamburger SV ===
On 11 July 2024, Selke joined Hamburger SV in 2. Bundesliga. In the 2024–25 season, he scored 22 goals to finish as the league's top scorer, helping Hamburger SV achieve promotion, and was also voted the 2. Bundesliga Player of the Season.

=== İstanbul Başakşehir ===
On 11 July 2025, Selke joined İstanbul Başakşehir on a two year contract.

== International career ==
=== German national youth teams ===
Though born in Schorndorf, Germany, Selke is eligible to represent both Ethiopia, the birthplace of his father, and the Czech Republic, the birthplace of his mother. He and fellow German youth international teammate Gedion Zelalem had in the past been approached by the Ethiopian Football Association to represent the African nation but both players elected to remain within the German camp.

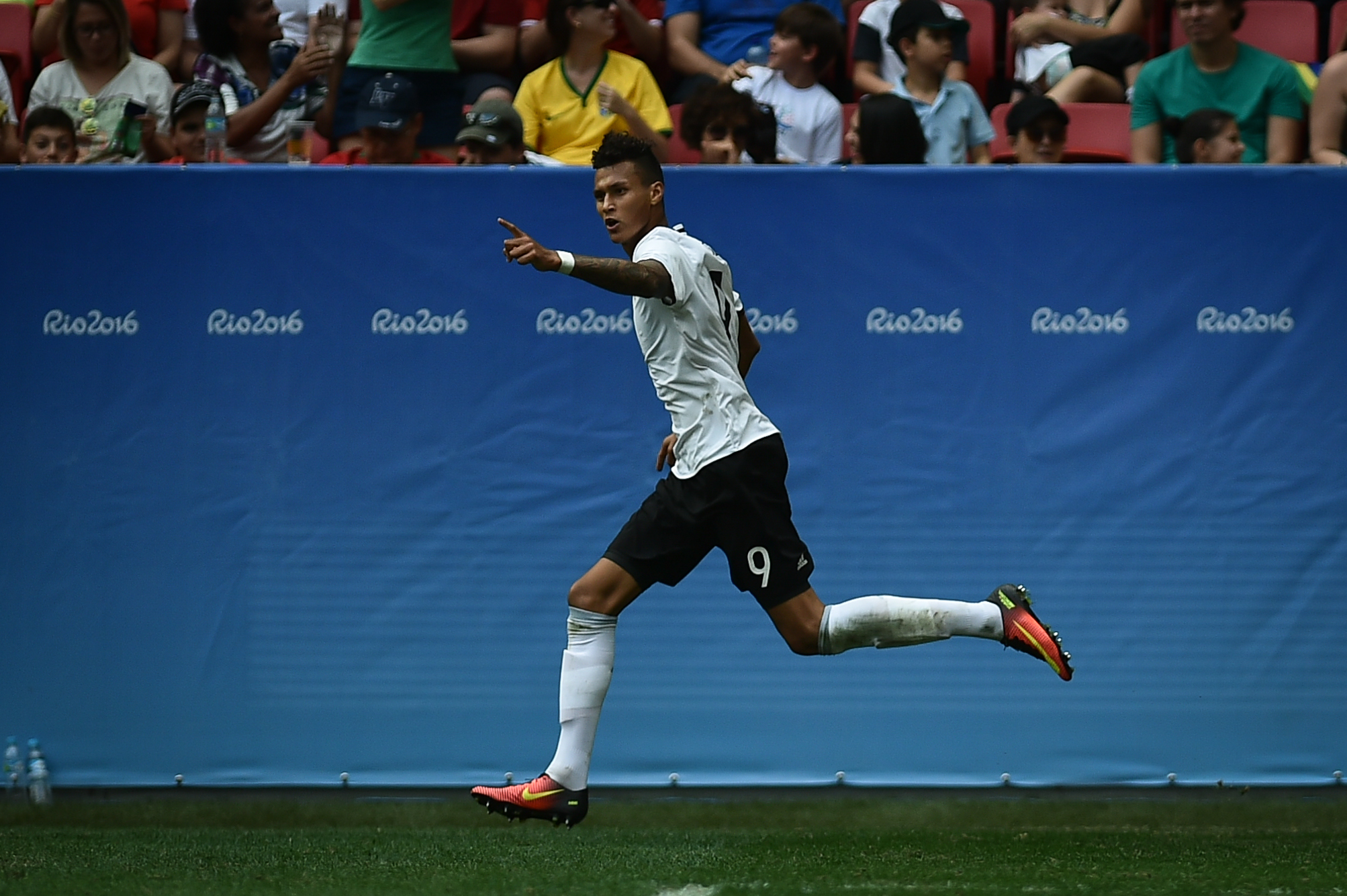
Selke celebrating a goal at the 2016 Rio Olympics

In 2014, he helped Germany win the UEFA European Under-19 Championship. Selke netted six goals throughout the tournament which earned him the Golden Boot award. His goalscoring tally equaled the tournament record, jointly held by Borko Veselinović and Álvaro Morata. Selke was also named as the tournament's Golden Player.

On 16 July 2016, Selke was named in Horst Hrubesch's 18-man squad for the 2016 Summer Olympics in Rio de Janeiro. He scored his first goal at the tournament on 7 August, netting Germany's second in a 3–3 draw with South Korea. Germany ultimately went on to win the Silver Medal, losing to Brazil in the final. The following year, he was included in Germany's 23-man squad for the 2017 UEFA European Under-21 Championship in Poland where they went on to be crowned champions after beating Spain 1–0 in the final.

== Style of play ==
Former Germany striker Klaus Fischer described Selke as being a "young Miroslav Klose", comparing his stature and strength in the air with that of Germany's all-time record goalscorer. Selke himself, however, cites former Bayern Munich striker Mario Gómez as being his idol.

== Career statistics ==
As of match played 1 July 2025

Appearances and goals by club, season and competition
Club	Season	League			National cup		Europe		Total	
Club	Season	Division	Apps	Goals	Apps	Goals	Apps	Goals	Apps	Goals
Werder Bremen	2013–14	Bundesliga	3	0	0	0	—		3	0
Werder Bremen	2014–15	Bundesliga	30	9	3	1	—		33	10
Werder Bremen	Total		33	9	3	1	0	0	36	10
RB Leipzig	2015–16	2. Bundesliga	30	10	2	0	—		32	10
RB Leipzig	2016–17	Bundesliga	21	4	0	0	—		21	4
RB Leipzig	Total		51	14	2	0	0	0	53	14
Hertha BSC	2017–18	Bundesliga	27	10	1	0	3 (Note: Appearances in UEFA Europa League)	4	31	14
Hertha BSC	2018–19	Bundesliga	30	3	2	1	—		32	4
Hertha BSC	2019–20	Bundesliga	19	1	2	0	—		21	1
Hertha BSC	Total		76	14	5	1	3	4	84	19
Werder Bremen (loan)	2019–20	Bundesliga	11	0	2	1	—		13	1
Werder Bremen (loan)	2020–21	Bundesliga	23	3	3	0	—		26	3
Werder Bremen (loan)	Total		34	3	5	1	0	0	39	4
Hertha BSC	2021–22	Bundesliga	25	4	3	1	—		28	5
Hertha BSC	2022–23	Bundesliga	13	1	1	1	—		14	2
Hertha BSC	Total		38	5	4	2	0	0	42	7
1. FC Köln	2022–23	Bundesliga	17	5	0	0	—		17	5
1. FC Köln	2023–24	Bundesliga	19	6	2	0	—		21	6
1. FC Köln	Total		36	11	2	0	0	0	38	11
Hamburger SV	2024–25	2. Bundesliga	31	22	2	1	—		33	23
Career total			299	78	23	6	3	4	318	88

== Honours ==
Germany U19

- UEFA European Under-19 Championship: 2014

Germany U21

- UEFA European Under-21 Championship: 2017

Germany U23

- Summer Olympic Games Silver Medal: 2016

Individual

- UEFA European Under-19 Championship: Golden Boot 2014
- UEFA European Under-19 Championship: Golden Player 2014
- UEFA European Under-19 Championship: Team of the Tournament 2014
- 2. Bundesliga top scorer: 2024–25
- 2. Bundesliga Player of the Season: 2024–25
