= Alexander Schwolow =

German footballer (born 1992)

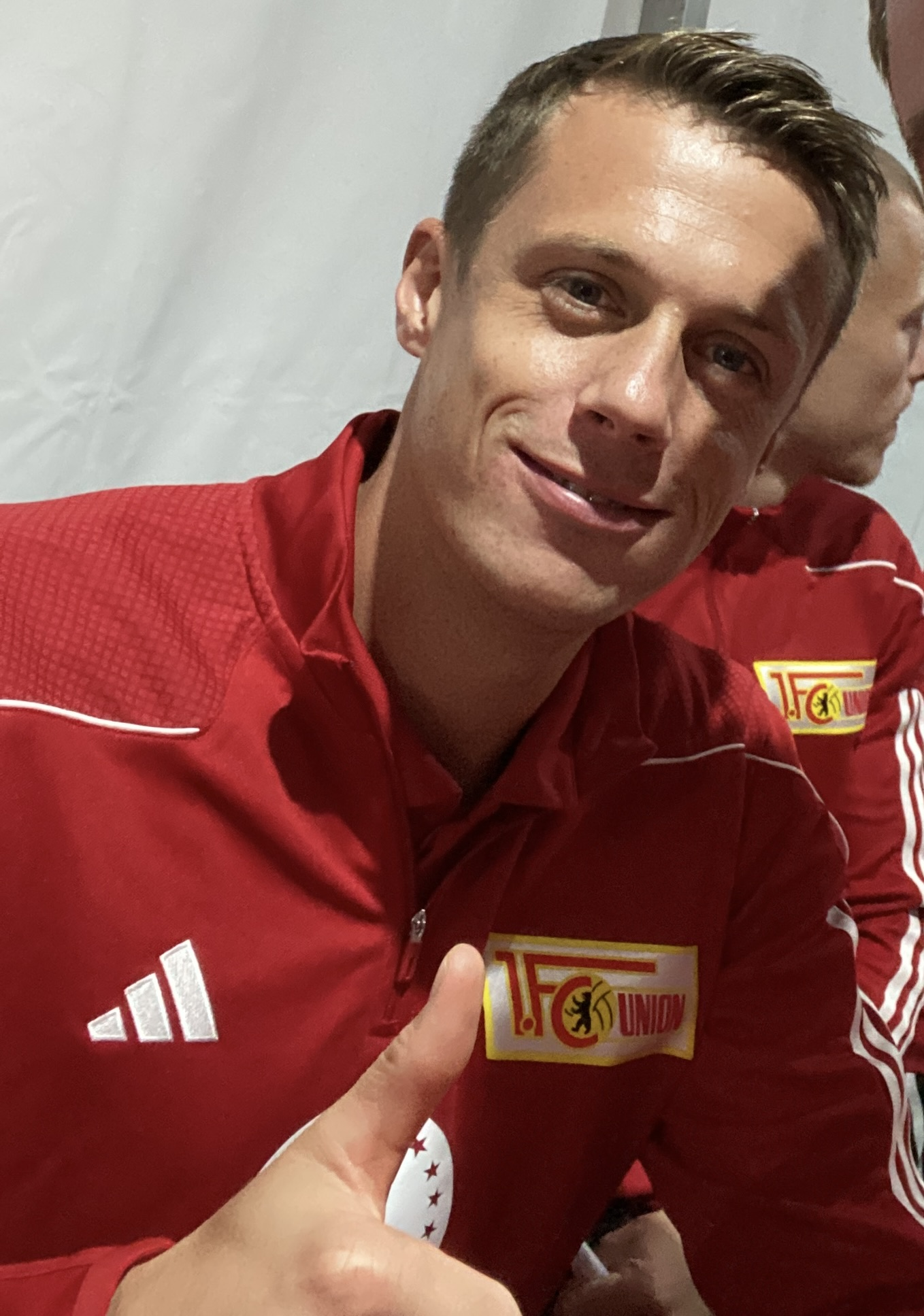
- Schwolow with Union Berlin in 2023

Personal information
- Date of birth: 2 June 1992 (age 34)
- Place of birth: Wiesbaden, Germany
- Height: 1.90 m (6 ft 3 in)
- Position: Goalkeeper

Team information
- Current team: Mainz 05
- Number: 1

Youth career
- –2005: SV Allendorf/Berghausen
- 2005–2008: Wehen Wiesbaden
- 2008–2010: SC Freiburg

Senior career*
Years	Team	Apps	(Gls)
2010–2012	SC Freiburg II	51	(0)
2012–2020	SC Freiburg	158	(0)
2014–2015	→ Arminia Bielefeld (loan)	37	(0)
2020–2023	Hertha BSC	51	(0)
2022–2023	→ Schalke 04 (loan)	23	(0)
2023–2025	Union Berlin	7	(0)
2025–2026	Heart of Midlothian	32	(0)
2026–	Mainz 05	5	(0)

International career
2010	Germany U18	3	(0)
2010–2011	Germany U19	2	(0)
2011	Germany U20	7	(0)
- * Club domestic league appearances and goals as of 24 October 2026

Alexander Schwolow (born 2 June 1992) is a German professional footballer who plays as a goalkeeper for Bundesliga club Mainz 05.

== Club career ==
=== Youth years ===
Schwolow began his youth career at 3. Liga side SV Wehen Wiesbaden. He left in 2008 for SC Freiburg's U17 team from where he later progressed to the U19 team.

=== SC Freiburg ===
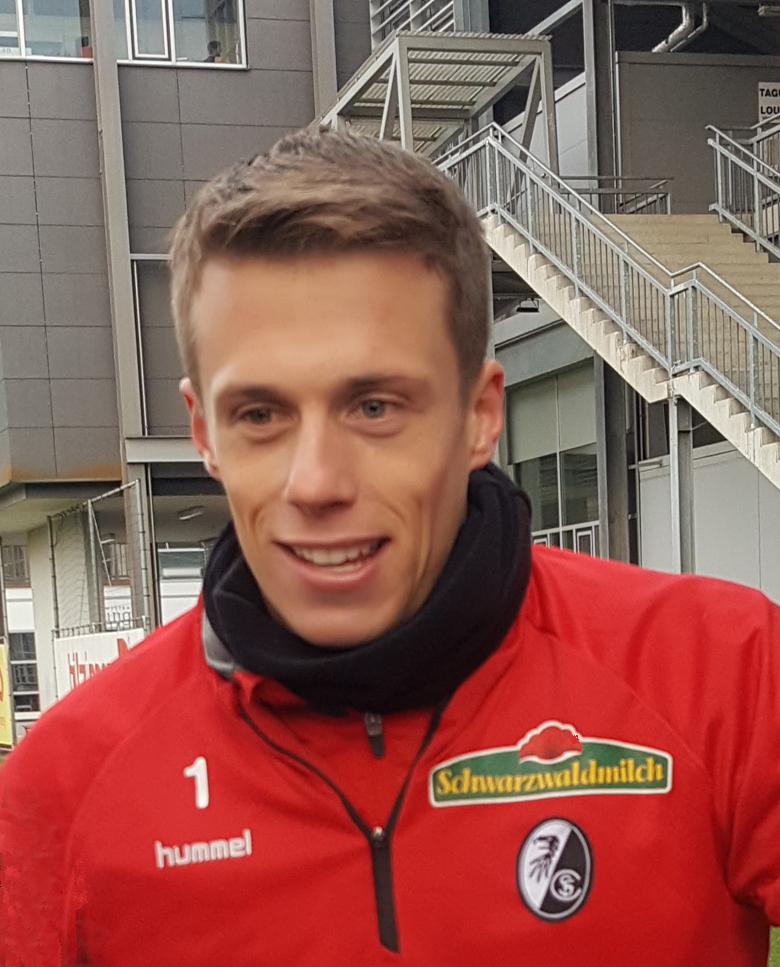
Schwolow with SC Freiburg in 2019

In 2010, Schwolow was promoted to SC Freiburg's reserve team. He managed to start 51 games in the Regionalliga Südwest, conceding 77 goals while keeping 12 clean sheets.

On 1 January 2012, Schwolow was called up to SC Freiburg's first team. He made his first appearance on 10 May 2014 in a 3–2 loss to Hannover 96.

On 1 July 2015, SC Freiburg recalled Schwolow after one season on loan at Arminia Bielefeld, after selling Roman Bürki to Borussia Dortmund.

==== Arminia Bielefeld (loan) ====
On 1 July 2014, Schwolow agreed to a two-year loan to Arminia Bielefeld who aimed at gaining promotion following their relegation from the 2. Bundesliga. He made his debut on 26 July 2014 in 2–1 win over Mainz 05 II. Schwolow made his first appearance in a non-league game in a 4–1 win over SV Sandhausen in a DFB-Pokal match on 17 August 2014.

=== Hertha BSC ===
On 4 August 2020, Hertha BSC agreed on a deal with SC Freiburg to sign Schwolow, after triggering his €8 million release clause. Under head coach Bruno Labbadia, the 28-year-old replaced long-time regular starter Rune Jarstein and made 18 Bundesliga appearances. As the Berlin-based side were in danger of relegation, Labbadia was replaced by Pál Dárdai, who had already coached the team from 2015 to 2019, and he preferred Jarstein in goal from matchday 19. However, Dárdai stated: "Alex Schwolow owns the future. He's number one, even if Rune is playing at the moment." On matchday 27, Schwolow returned in Hertha's goal as Jarstein was out after becoming infected with the Alpha variant of COVID-19 during the pandemic.

Schwolow became the starting goalkeeper again during the 2021–22 season, as Hertha were once again in a relegation fight. On 2 April 2022, he suffered a thigh injury in the league match against Bayer Leverkusen, ruling him out for the remainder of the season. He was replaced in goal by backup Marcel Lotka, and afterwards by Oliver Christensen in the relegation playoffs against Hamburger SV after Lotka broke his nose.

On 26 July 2023, his contract with Hertha was terminated by mutual consent.

==== Schalke 04 (loan) ====
On 15 June 2022, Schalke 04 announced the signing of Schwolow on loan for the 2022–23 season.

=== Union Berlin ===
On 26 July 2023, Schwolow signed for 1. FC Union Berlin ahead of the 2023–24 season, joining the club shortly after they had secured qualification for the UEFA Champions League for the first time in their history. Across his two seasons in Berlin, Schwolow primarily served as understudy to first-choice goalkeeper Frederik Rønnow, and made seven competitive first-team appearances. He left the club upon the expiry of his contract in the summer of 2025.

=== Hearts ===
On 31 August 2025, Schwolow signed a two-season contract with Scottish Premiership side Heart of Midlothian. He made his debut on 13 September in a 2–0 away victory over Rangers at Ibrox Stadium.

=== Mainz 05 ===
On 17 July 2026, Schwolow signed with Bundesliga club Mainz 05. He joined the club on 30 July, following the conclusion of the Hearts' Champions League qualifying campaign.

== International career ==
Schwolow represented Germany at various youth levels, including the under-18, under-19, and under-20 teams. He has not been capped at senior international level.

== Career statistics ==
As of 27 October 2026

Appearances and goals by club, season and competition
Club	Season	League			National cup (Note: Includes DFB-Pokal, Scottish Cup)		Europe		Other		Total	
Club	Season	Division	Apps	Goals	Apps	Goals	Apps	Goals	Apps	Goals	Apps	Goals
SC Freiburg II	2010–11	Regionalliga Südwest	9	0	—		—		—		9	0
SC Freiburg II	2011–12	Regionalliga Südwest	18	0	—		—		—		18	0
SC Freiburg II	2012–13	Regionalliga Südwest	14	0	—		—		—		14	0
SC Freiburg II	2013–14	Regionalliga Südwest	10	0	—		—		—		10	0
SC Freiburg II	Total		51	0	—		—		—		51	0
SC Freiburg	2010–11	Bundesliga	0	0	0	0	—		—		0	0
SC Freiburg	2011–12	Bundesliga	0	0	—		—		—		0	0
SC Freiburg	2012–13	Bundesliga	0	0	0	0	—		—		0	0
SC Freiburg	2013–14	Bundesliga	1	0	0	0	0	0	—		1	0
SC Freiburg	2015–16	2. Bundesliga	33	0	0	0	—		—		33	0
SC Freiburg	2016–17	Bundesliga	34	0	1	0	—		—		35	0
SC Freiburg	2017–18	Bundesliga	33	0	2	0	2 (Note: Appearances in UEFA Europa League)	0	—		37	0
SC Freiburg	2018–19	Bundesliga	33	0	2	0	—		—		35	0
SC Freiburg	2019–20	Bundesliga	24	0	1	0	—		—		25	0
SC Freiburg	Total		158	0	6	0	2	0	—		166	0
Arminia Bielefeld (loan)	2014–15	3. Liga	37	0	5	0	—		—		42	0
Hertha BSC	2020–21	Bundesliga	26	0	1	0	—		—		27	0
Hertha BSC	2021–22	Bundesliga	25	0	3	0	—		0	0	28	0
Hertha BSC	Total		51	0	4	0	—		0	0	55	0
Schalke 04 (loan)	2022–23	Bundesliga	23	0	2	0	—		—		25	0
Union Berlin	2023–24	Bundesliga	1	0	0	0	0	0	—		1	0
Union Berlin	2024–25	Bundesliga	6	0	0	0	—		—		6	0
Union Berlin	Total		7	0	0	0	0	0	—		7	0
Heart of Midlothian	2025–26	Scottish Premiership	31	0	1	0	—		—		32	0
Heart of Midlothian	2026–27	Scottish Premiership	0	0	0	0	2	0	0	0	2	0
Heart of Midlothian	Total		31	0	1	0	2	0	—		34	0
Mainz 05	2026–27	Bundesliga	5	0	1	0	—		—		6	0
Career total			363	0	19	0	4	0	0	0	386	0

== Honours ==
Arminia Bielefeld

- 3. Liga: 2014–15

SC Freiburg

- 2. Bundesliga: 2015–16
