= Marco Richter =

German footballer (born 1997)

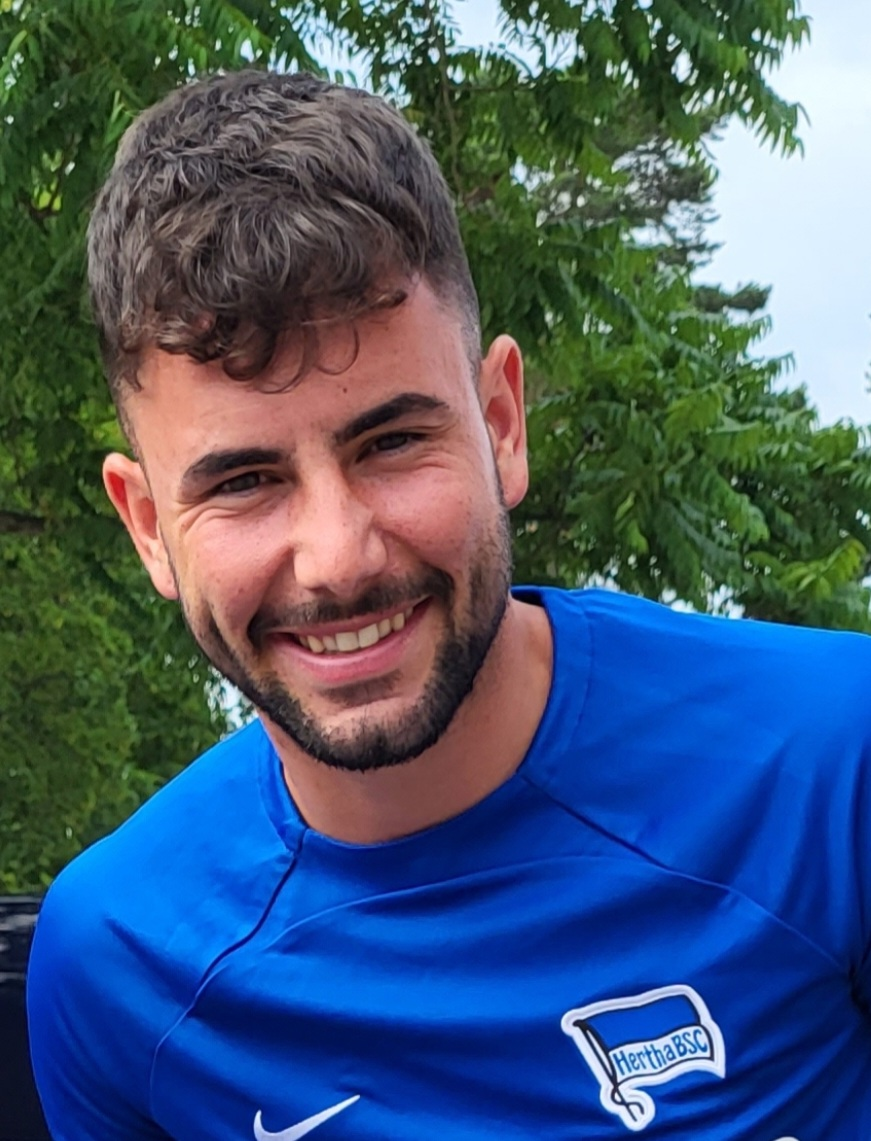
- Richter in 2022

Personal information
- Full name: Marco Richter
- Date of birth: 24 November 1997 (age 28)
- Place of birth: Friedberg, Germany
- Height: 1.76 m (5 ft 9 in)
- Positions: Winger; attacking midfielder

Team information
- Current team: Darmstadt 98
- Number: 5

Youth career
- –2004: SV Ried 1951
- 2004–2012: Bayern Munich
- 2012–2016: FC Augsburg

Senior career*
Years	Team	Apps	(Gls)
2015–2021	FC Augsburg II	61	(42)
2017–2021	FC Augsburg	97	(12)
2021–2023	Hertha BSC	62	(11)
2023–2026	Mainz 05	20	(1)
2024–2025	→ Hamburger SV (loan)	27	(1)
2025–2026	→ Darmstadt 98 (loan)	30	(2)
2026–	Darmstadt 98	0	(0)

International career
2017	Germany U20	1	(0)
2018–2019	Germany U21	8	(3)
2021	Germany Olympic	3	(0)
Medal record
Men's football
Representing Germany
UEFA European Under-21 Championship
Runner-up	2019
- * Club domestic league appearances and goals as of 29 August 2026

Marco Richter (German pronunciation: [ˈmaʁko ˈʁɪçtɐ]; born 24 November 1997) is a German professional footballer who plays as a winger or attacking midfielder for 2. Bundesliga club Darmstadt 98.

== Club career ==
=== Early years ===
Born in Friedberg, Bavaria, Richter started his career with local side SV Ried 1951. After being scouted by German giants Bayern Munich on a talent day, he played for their youth academy between 2004 and 2012. After eight seasons in Munich, Richter joined the FC Augsburg academy, and on 22 May 2015 he made his debut for the Augsburg reserves during a 2–1 loss against FC Ingolstadt 04 II in the German fourth division. The following season, he scored seven goals in 16 regular season appearances and two relegation matches. Concurrently, with 24 goals in 16 appearances for the FC Augsburg under-19 team, Richter helped secure promotion to the Under 19 Bundesliga. During the 2016–17 season with the reserves, Richter scored 23 goals in 27 appearances, making him third on the topscorer list for the season. On 30 July 2016, he attracted nationwide attention when the FC Augsburg reserves won 12–0 over SV Seligenporten, with Richter scoring seven goals in the match.

=== FC Augsburg ===
After impressing for the reserve team, Richter was called up for the senior squad and made his Bundesliga debut on 14 October 2017, coming on as an 87th-minute substitute for Kevin Danso in a 2–2 draw against TSG Hoffenheim. On 4 February 2018, he scored his first professional goal during a 3–0 home win over Eintracht Frankfurt.

=== Hertha BSC ===
On 9 August 2021, Richter signed with fellow Bundesliga club Hertha BSC.

=== Mainz 05 ===
On 22 August 2023, he transferred permanently to fellow Bundesliga club Mainz 05 following Hertha BSC's relegation. On 2 September 2026, Richter's contract with Mainz was mutually terminated.

==== Loan to Hamburger SV ====
On 28 August 2024, Richter moved on loan to Hamburger SV in the 2. Bundesliga.

==== Loan to Darmstadt 98 ====
On 31 July 2025, he joined Darmstadt 98, returning to the second division.

=== Darmstadt 98 ===
On 10 September 2026, just eight days after his contract with Mainz 05 was mutually terminated, Richter returned to Darmstadt 98 and signed a contract as a free agent, ahead of the 2026–27 season.

== International career ==
Richter made his debut for the Germany under-21 team on 7 September 2018 in a 3–0 win over Mexico. His first goals for the side came during the 2019 UEFA European Under-21 Championship against Denmark, which Germany won 3–1.

== Career statistics ==
As of 17 May 2026

Appearances and goals by club, season and competition
Club	Season	League			Cup		Other		Total	
Club	Season	Division	Apps	Goals	Apps	Goals	Apps	Goals	Apps	Goals
FC Augsburg II	2014–15	Regionalliga Bayern	1	1	—		—		1	1
FC Augsburg II	2015–16	Regionalliga Bayern	18	7	—		2 (Note: Appearances in the Regionalliga relegation play-offs)	0	20	7
FC Augsburg II	2016–17	Regionalliga Bayern	27	23	—		—		27	23
FC Augsburg II	2017–18	Regionalliga Bayern	14	9	—		—		14	9
FC Augsburg II	2019–21	Regionalliga Bayern	1	1	—		—		1	1
FC Augsburg II	Total		61	41	—		2	0	63	41
FC Augsburg	2017–18	Bundesliga	12	1	0	0	—		12	1
FC Augsburg	2018–19	Bundesliga	25	4	4	1	—		29	5
FC Augsburg	2019–20	Bundesliga	31	4	1	0	—		32	4
FC Augsburg	2020–21	Bundesliga	29	3	0	0	—		29	3
FC Augsburg	Total		97	12	5	1	—		102	13
Hertha BSC	2021–22	Bundesliga	30	5	2	1	1 (Note: Appearance in the Bundesliga relegation play-offs)	0	33	6
Hertha BSC	2022–23	Bundesliga	29	6	0	0	—		29	6
Hertha BSC	2023–24	2. Bundesliga	3	0	1	2	—		4	2
Hertha BSC	Total		62	11	3	3	1	0	66	14
Mainz 05	2023–24	Bundesliga	20	1	1	0	—		21	1
Mainz 05	2026–27	Bundesliga	0	0	0	0	—		0	0
Mainz 05	Total		20	1	1	0	—		21	1
Hamburger SV (loan)	2024–25	2. Bundesliga	27	1	1	0	—		28	1
Darmstadt 98 (loan)	2025–26	2. Bundesliga	30	2	2	0	—		32	2
Career total			297	68	12	4	3	0	312	72

== Honours ==
Germany U21

- UEFA European Under-21 Championship runner-up 2019

=== Individual ===
- European Under-21 Championship Bronze Boot: 2019
