= Linus Gechter =

German footballer (born 2004)

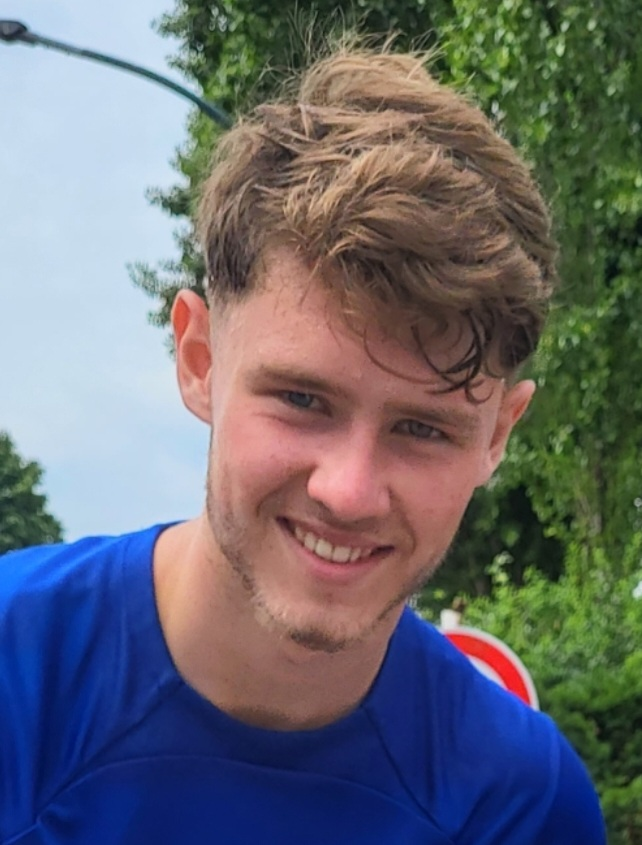
- Linus Gechter

Personal information
- Full name: Linus Jasper Gechter
- Date of birth: 27 February 2004 (age 22)
- Place of birth: Berlin, Germany
- Height: 1.88 m (6 ft 2 in)
- Positions: Centre-back; right-back

Team information
- Current team: Hertha BSC
- Number: 44

Youth career
- 2014–2015: Hertha Zehlendorf
- 2015–2021: Hertha BSC

Senior career*
Years	Team	Apps	(Gls)
2021–	Hertha BSC	80	(3)
2021–	Hertha BSC II	10	(0)
2023	→ Eintracht Braunschweig (loan)	5	(0)

International career^{‡}
2019–2020	Germany U16	4	(0)
2021	Germany U18	3	(1)
2022–2023	Germany U19	9	(0)
2023–	Germany U21	7	(0)
- * Club domestic league appearances and goals as of 18 May 2026 ‡ National team caps and goals as of 17 November 2026

Linus Jasper Gechter (born 27 February 2004) is a German professional footballer who plays as a centre-back or right-back for 2. Bundesliga club Hertha BSC and the Germany national under-21 team.

== Club career ==
A youth product of Hertha Zehlendorf and Hertha BSC, Gechter started training with Hertha BSC's senior side in 2021. He made his professional debut with Hertha BSC in a 3–1 Bundesliga win over VfL Bochum on 12 September 2021. On 17 March 2022, he signed a professional contract with Hertha, tying him to the club until 30 June 2022. He came in second place for the 2021 U17 Fritz Walter Medal.

On 7 December 2022, Gechter agreed to join 2. Bundesliga club Eintracht Braunschweig on loan until the end of the 2022–23 season.

== International career ==
Gechter is a youth international for Germany, having played up to the Germany U19s.

== Honours ==
Individual

- Fritz Walter Medal U17 Silver: 2021
