= Julian Eitschberger =

German association football player (born 2005)

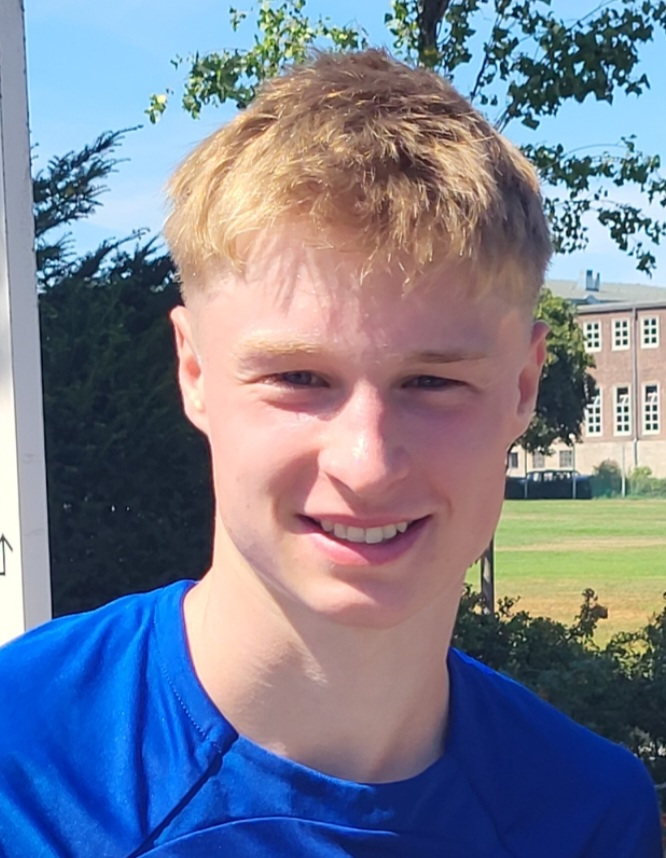

Personal information
- Date of birth: 5 March 2004 (age 22)
- Place of birth: Hohen Neuendorf, Germany
- Height: 1.80 m (5 ft 11 in)
- Position: Defender

Team information
- Current team: Hertha BSC
- Number: 2

Youth career
- –2017: SC Staaken
- 2017–2022: Hertha BSC

Senior career*
Years	Team	Apps	(Gls)
2022–	Hertha BSC	27	(2)
2022–	Hertha BSC II	28	(0)
2023–2024	→ Hallescher FC (loan)	31	(1)
2024–2025	→ Rot-Weiss Essen (loan)	33	(4)

International career^{‡}
2020	Germany U17	1	(0)
2021–2022	Germany U18	2	(0)
2022	Germany U19	4	(0)
2023–	Germany U20	10	(0)
2023–	Germany U21	1	(0)
- * Club domestic league appearances and goals as of 18 May 2026 ‡ National team caps and goals as of 24 March 2025

Julian Eitschberger (born 5 March 2004) is a German professional football player who plays as a defender for 2. Bundesliga club Hertha BSC. He has represented the Germany national under-21 football team.

== Club career ==
Eitschberger initially played for SC Staaken in his youth before moving to the Hertha BSC youth team in 2017. In 2022, it was announced that he would receive a professional contract with Hertha BSC from 2023. He made his Bundesliga debut on 9 April 2022 in a 4-1 home loss to Union Berlin.

In the summer of 2023, he signed a new long-term contract with Hertha Berlin, extending his deal until 2026. That summer he moved on loan to 3. Liga club Hallescher FC for the entirety of the 2023-24 season. He made his debut for the club in a 4-1 home win against Sandhausen on 3 September 2023 in the 3. Liga. He scored his first goal for the club against Viktoria Köln, scoring the winner in a 2-1 home league win on 5 November 2023.

In August 2024, he joined Rot-Weiss Essen on loan. He made his debut for the club on 24 August 2024 in a 0-0 home draw against Arminia Bielefeld in the 3. Liga. Henscore Shia first goal for the club in a 3-3 league away draw against Dynamo Dresden on 20 October 2024.

== International career ==
In October 2023, he was called-up to Germany national under-21 football team for the first time. He played for the German U21 side appearing as a first-half substitute for Leandro Morgalla in a 3-2 away win against Bulgaria U21 on 13 October 2023 in a UEFA European U21 Championship qualification match.
