= Kélian Nsona =

French footballer (born 2002)

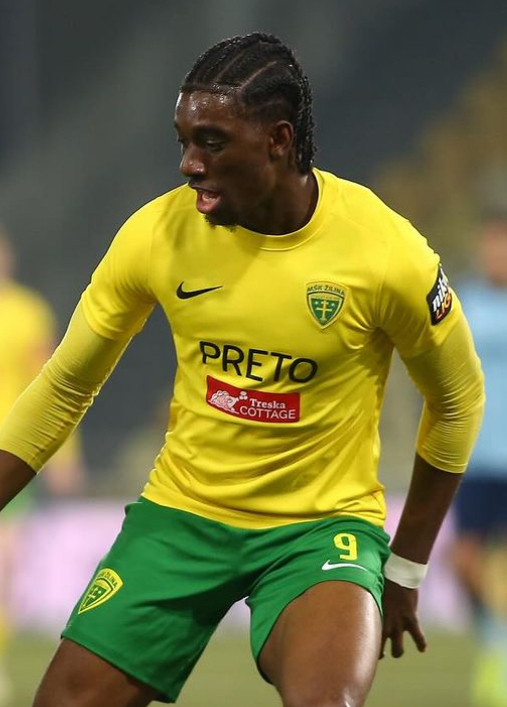
- Nsona in 2024

Personal information
- Full name: Kélian Nsona Wa Saka
- Date of birth: 11 May 2002 (age 24)
- Place of birth: Ivry-sur-Seine, France
- Height: 1.89 m (6 ft 2 in)
- Position: Winger

Team information
- Current team: Rodez
- Number: 21

Youth career
- 2009–2012: Ivry
- 2012–2017: Paris FC
- 2017–2019: Caen

Senior career*
Years	Team	Apps	(Gls)
2019–2022	Caen II	12	(3)
2019–2022	Caen	35	(2)
2022–2025	Hertha BSC	0	(0)
2023–2025	Hertha BSC II	6	(0)
2024	→ MŠK Žilina (loan)	8	(0)
2024	→ MŠK Žilina B (loan)	3	(0)
2024–2025	→ Emmen (loan)	38	(13)
2025–2026	Casa Pia	10	(1)
2026–	Rodez	1	(0)

International career
2018–2019	France U17	13	(1)
2019–2020	France U18	6	(1)
- * Club domestic league appearances and goals as of 5 September 2026

Kélian Nsona Wa Saka (born 11 May 2002) is a French professional footballer who plays as a winger for Ligue 2 club Rodez.

== Professional career ==
On 4 September 2019, Nsona signed his first professional contract with Stade Malherbe Caen. He made his professional debut with Caen in a 1–0 Ligue 2 win over AS Nancy on 2 December 2019.

On 31 January 2022, Nsona signed with Bundesliga club Hertha BSC.

On 9 February 2024, Hertha BSC announced that they have loaned Nsona out to Slovak club MŠK Žilina. On 1 August 2024, Nsona moved on a new loan to Emmen in the Netherlands.

== Personal life ==
Born in France, Nsona is of Congolese and Cameroonian descent.
