= Marcel Lotka =

Polish footballer (born 2001)

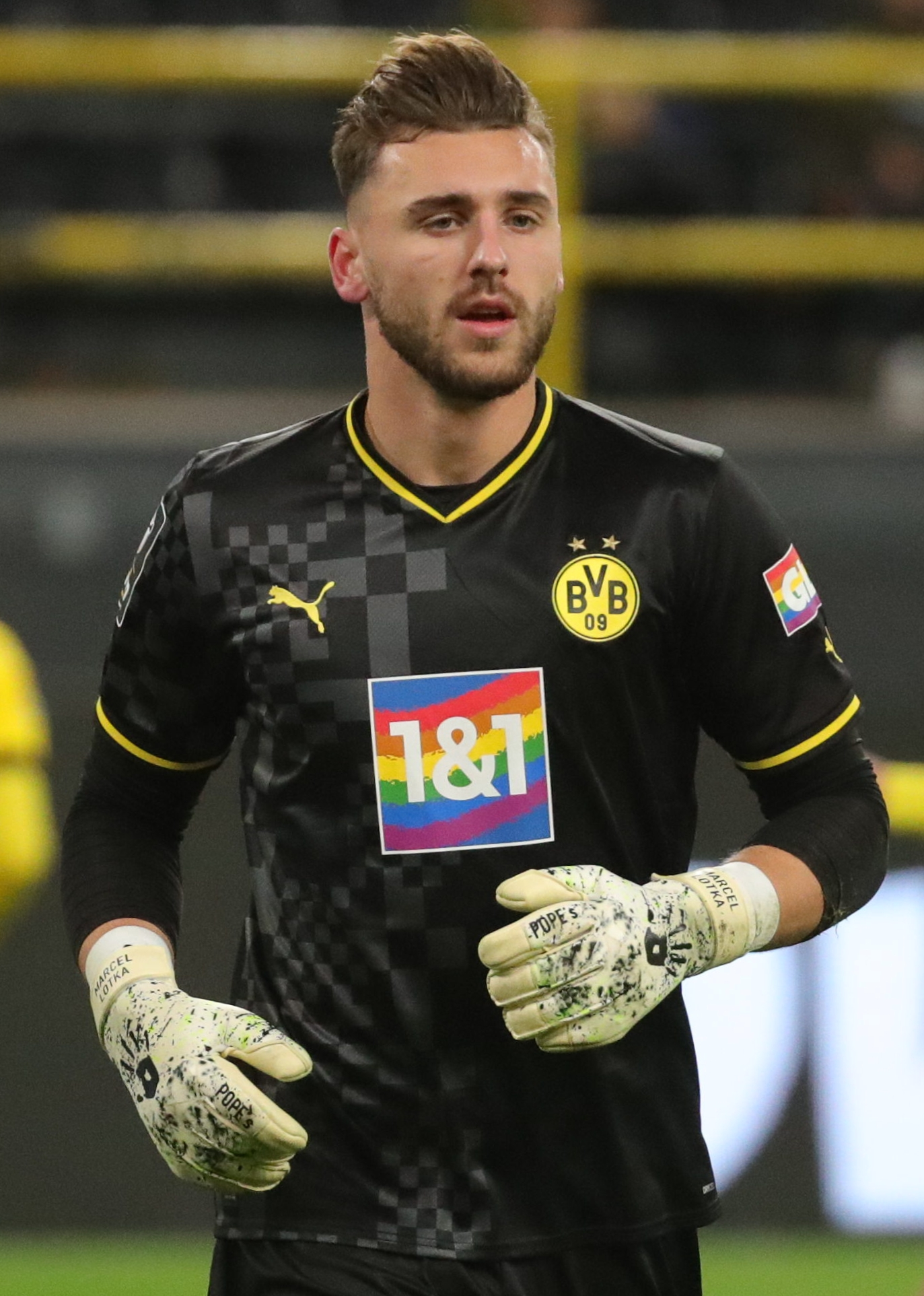
- Lotka playing for Borussia Dortmund II in 2022

Personal information
- Full name: Marcel Laurenz Lotka
- Date of birth: 25 May 2001 (age 25)
- Place of birth: Duisburg, Germany
- Height: 1.90 m (6 ft 3 in)
- Position: Goalkeeper

Team information
- Current team: Energie Cottbus
- Number: 1

Youth career
- MSV Duisburg
- 2014–2015: Schalke 04
- 2015–2017: Rot-Weiss Essen
- 2017–2020: Bayer Leverkusen

Senior career*
| Years | Team | Apps | (Gls) |
| 2020–2022 | Hertha BSC II | 11 | (0) |
| 2021–2022 | Hertha BSC | 10 | (0) |
| 2022–2025 | Borussia Dortmund II | 84 | (0) |
| 2022–2025 | Borussia Dortmund | 0 | (0) |
| 2025–2026 | Fortuna Düsseldorf | 2 | (0) |
| 2026– | Energie Cottbus | 0 | (0) |

International career
| 2016–2017 | Poland U16 | 5 | (0) |
| 2017–2018 | Poland U17 | 10 | (0) |
| 2018–2019 | Poland U18 | 2 | (0) |
| 2019 | Poland U19 | 1 | (0) |
| 2021–2022 | Poland U20 | 2 | (0) |
| 2021 | Poland U21 | 2 | (0) |
- * Club domestic league appearances and goals as of 09:07, 20 March 2026 (UTC)

Marcel Laurenz Lotka (born 25 May 2001) is a professional footballer who plays as a goalkeeper for 2. Bundesliga club Energie Cottbus. Born in Germany, he represented Poland as a youth international.

== Career ==
In March 2022, Lotka signed a two-year contract with Borussia Dortmund II, starting in the 2022–23 season, but after several games in the starting line-up of Hertha BSC with positive acclaim, the Berlin-based club started exploring options to reverse the deal and keep the player for the next season. However, this appeal was unsuccessful; in May 2022, Lotka's move to Dortmund was officially confirmed.

On 9 July 2025, he signed with 2. Bundesliga club Fortuna Düsseldorf.

On 15 June 2026, Lotka moved to 3. Liga club Energie Cottbus.

== Career statistics ==
As of match played 14 March 2026

Appearances and goals by club, season and competition
| Club | Season | League | | | DFB-Pokal | | Europe | | Other | | Total | |
| Club | Season | Division | Apps | Goals | Apps | Goals | Apps | Goals | Apps | Goals | Apps | Goals |
|---|---|---|---|---|---|---|---|---|---|---|---|---|
| Hertha BSC II | 2020–21 | Regionalliga Nordost | 3 | 0 | — | | — | | — | | 3 | 0 |
| Hertha BSC II | 2021–22 | Regionalliga Nordost | 8 | 0 | — | | — | | — | | 8 | 0 |
| Hertha BSC II | Total | | 11 | 0 | — | | — | | — | | 11 | 0 |
| Hertha BSC | 2020–21 | Bundesliga | 0 | 0 | 0 | 0 | — | | — | | 0 | 0 |
| Hertha BSC | 2021–22 | Bundesliga | 10 | 0 | 0 | 0 | — | | 0 | 0 | 10 | 0 |
| Hertha BSC | Total | | 10 | 0 | 0 | 0 | — | | 0 | 0 | 10 | 0 |
| Borussia Dortmund II | 2022–23 | 3. Liga | 30 | 0 | — | | — | | — | | 30 | 0 |
| Borussia Dortmund II | 2023–24 | 3. Liga | 28 | 0 | — | | — | | — | | 28 | 0 |
| Borussia Dortmund II | 2024–25 | 3. Liga | 26 | 0 | — | | — | | — | | 26 | 0 |
| Borussia Dortmund II | Total | | 84 | 0 | — | | — | | — | | 84 | 0 |
| Borussia Dortmund | 2022–23 | Bundesliga | 0 | 0 | 0 | 0 | 0 | 0 | — | | 0 | 0 |
| Borussia Dortmund | 2023–24 | Bundesliga | 0 | 0 | 0 | 0 | 0 | 0 | — | | 0 | 0 |
| Borussia Dortmund | 2024–25 | Bundesliga | 0 | 0 | 0 | 0 | 0 | 0 | — | | 0 | 0 |
| Borussia Dortmund | Total | | 0 | 0 | 0 | 0 | 0 | 0 | — | | 0 | 0 |
| Fortuna Düsseldorf | 2025–26 | 2. Bundesliga | 2 | 0 | 0 | 0 | — | | — | | 2 | 0 |
| Energie Cottbus | 2026–27 | 2. Bundesliga | 0 | 0 | 0 | 0 | — | | — | | 0 | 0 |
| Career total | | | 107 | 0 | 0 | 0 | 0 | 0 | 0 | 0 | 107 | 0 |
