= 2022–23 TSV 1860 Munich season =

TSV 1860 Munich
2022–23 season
- President: Robert Reisinger
- Head Coach: Michael Köllner (until 31 January); Günther Gorenzel (31 January - 26 February); Maurizio Jacobacci (from 26 February)
- Stadium: Grünwalder Stadion
- 3. Liga: 8th
- DFB-Pokal: First Round
- Top goalscorer: League: Fynn Lakenmacher (8); All: Fynn Lakenmacher (8)
- Highest home attendance: 15,000 (in all 20 home matches)
- Average home league attendance: 15,000
Home colours	Away colours	Third colours

The 2022–23 season was the 163rd in the history of TSV 1860 Munich and their fifth consecutive season in the third division. The club participated in the 3. Liga and DFB-Pokal.

== Season events ==
On 25 January, 1860 extended their contract with Michael Glück. The following day, 26 January, Michael Glück joined Hessen Kassel on loan for the remainder of the season.

On 31 January, Michael Köllner was sacked as the Head Coach of 1860, with Günther Gorenzel being appointed as Interim Head Coach.

On 26 February, Günther Gorenzel's role as Interim Head Coach ended, with Maurizio Jacobacci being appointed as 1860s new Head Coach.

On 10 May, 1860 announced that Marcel Bär would be leaving the club at the end of the season when his contract expires.

On 19 May, 1860 announced that Semi Belkahia, Joseph Boyamba, Stefan Lex, Quirin Moll, Daniel Wein, Marius Willsch and Yannick Deichmann would all be leaving the club at the end of the season when their contracts expire.

== Players ==
As of 31 January 2023

Note: Flags indicate national team as defined under FIFA eligibility rules; some limited exceptions apply. Players may hold more than one non-FIFA nationality.

No.	Pos.	Nation	Player
1	GK	GER	Marco Hiller
3	DF	GER	Niklas Lang
4	DF	NED	Jesper Verlaat
5	DF	GER	Quirin Moll
6	MF	GER	Tim Rieder
7	FW	GER	Stefan Lex (captain)
8	MF	GER	Erik Tallig
9	FW	KOS	Albion Vrenezi
10	MF	POL	Martin Kobylański
11	MF	GER	Fabian Greilinger
12	GK	FIN	Julius Schmid
13	DF	GER	Alexander Freitag
14	FW	MNE	Meris Skenderović
15	MF	GER	Marcel Bär
17	MF	GER	Daniel Wein

No.	Pos.	Nation	Player
19	FW	GER	Fynn Lakenmacher
20	MF	GER	Yannick Deichmann
22	DF	GER	Christopher Lannert
23	MF	GER	Devin Sür
24	MF	SUI	Nathan Wicht
25	DF	GER	Marius Willsch
26	MF	AUT	Raphael Holzhauser (on loan from OH Leuven)
27	DF	GER	Semi Belkahia
30	MF	SRB	Miloš Cocić
33	MF	GER	Joseph Boyamba
36	DF	GER	Phillipp Steinhart
38	MF	GER	Marius Wörl
39	DF	GER	Leandro Morgalla
40	GK	GER	Tom Kretzschmar

=== Out on loan ===
Note: Flags indicate national team as defined under FIFA eligibility rules; some limited exceptions apply. Players may hold more than one non-FIFA nationality.

No. / Pos. / Nation / Player; — / DF / AUT / Michael Glück (at Hessen Kassel until 30 June 2023)	No. / Pos. / Nation / Player; — / MF / GER / Lorenz Knöferl (at Carl Zeiss Jena until 30 June 2023)

== Transfers ==
=== In ===
Date	Position	Nationality	Name	From	Fee	Ref.
16 May 2022 (Note: Transfer announced on the shown date, becoming official on 1 July 2022.)	DF	(Germany)	Tim Rieder	Türkgücü München	Undisclosed	
17 May 2022	FW	(Montenegro)	Meris Skenderović	1. FC Schweinfurt 05	Undisclosed	
17 May 2022	FW	(Kosovo)	Albion Vrenezi	Türkgücü München	Undisclosed	
18 May 2022	FW	(Germany)	Fynn Lakenmacher	TSV Havelse	Undisclosed	
19 May 2022	MF	(Poland)	Martin Kobylański	Eintracht Braunschweig	Undisclosed	
26 May 2022	DF	(Germany)	Christopher Lannert	SC Verl	Undisclosed	
4 June 2022	DF	(Netherlands)	Jesper Verlaat	Waldhof Mannheim	Undisclosed	
9 June 2022	GK	(Finland)	Julius Schmid	VfB Lübeck	Undisclosed	
18 June 2022	MF	(Germany)	Joseph Boyamba	Waldhof Mannheim	Undisclosed	

=== Loans in ===
Start date	Position	Nationality	Name	From	End date	Ref.
11 January 2023	MF	(Austria)	Raphael Holzhauser	Oud-Heverlee Leuven	End of season	

=== Out ===
Date	Position	Nationality	Name	To	Fee	Ref.
20 June 2022	FW	(Germany)	Johann Ngounou Djayo	Wacker Burghausen	Undisclosed	

=== Loans out ===
Start date	Position	Nationality	Name	To	End date	Ref.
26 January 2023	DF	(Austria)	Michael Glück	Hessen Kassel	End of season	
31 January 2023	MF	(Germany)	Lorenz Knöferl	Carl Zeiss Jena	End of season	

=== Released ===
Date	Position	Nationality	Name	Joined	Date	Ref
25 January 2023	FW	(Germany)	Kevin Goden	1. FC Düren		
10 May 2023	MF	(Germany)	Marcel Bär	Erzgebirge Aue	1 July 2023	
19 May 2023	DF	(Germany)	Semi Belkahia	Arminia Bielefeld	1 July 2023	
19 May 2023	DF	(Germany)	Quirin Moll			
19 May 2023	DF	(Germany)	Marius Willsch	Retired		
19 May 2023	MF	(Germany)	Joseph Boyamba	Elversberg		
19 May 2023	MF	(Germany)	Daniel Wein			
19 May 2023	MF	(Germany)	Yannick Deichmann	Ingolstadt 04	1 July 2023	
19 May 2023	FW	(Germany)	Stefan Lex	Retired		

== Friendlies ==
25 June 2022	Karlsruher SC	0–4	1860 Munich	Kirchheim bei München
14:00 CEST (UTC+2)		Report	Vrenezi 3', 58'; Tallig 20'; Steinhart 38'	Stadium: Sportpark Heimstetten; Attendance: 1,400; Referee: Steffen Grimmeißen

6 July 2022	LASK	1–1	1860 Munich	Windischgarsten
18:30 CEST (UTC+2)	Goiginger 70'; Boller (yellow card); Sabitzer (yellow card)	Report	Lakenmacher 60'; Verlaat (yellow card)	Stadium: Sportplatz Windischgarsten; Attendance: 600; Referee: Philipp Hubinger

10 July 2022	Borussia Mönchengladbach	6–0	1860 Munich	Rottach-Egern
14:00 CEST (UTC+2)	Hofmann 26'; Sanches 33'; Stindl 48'; Herrmann 47', 70'; Wolf 66'	Report		Stadium: Stadion am Birkenmoos; Attendance: 2,500; Referee: Wolfgang Haslberger

15 July 2022	Newcastle United	3–0	1860 Munich	Saalfelden, Austria
14:30 CEST (UTC+2)	Willock 54'; Longstaff 64'; Guimarães 76'; Lascelles (yellow card); Joelinton (yellow card)	Report		Stadium: Saalfelden Arena; Attendance: 600; Referee: Reuf Salihovic

22 September 2022	WSG Tirol	0–1	1860 Munich	Wörgl, Austria
18:30 CEST (UTC+2)		Report	Skenderović 72'	Stadium: Sportstadion Wörgl; Attendance: 500; Referee: Patrick Eisler

19 November 2022 Wörthersee Cup Semi-final	1860 Munich	3–3 (4–3 p)	Hertha BSC	Klagenfurt am Wörthersee, Austria
16:00 CET (UTC+1)	Vrenezi 72'; Lakenmacher 72'; Morgalla 90+3'	Report	Kanga 42'; Moll 54' (o.g.); Lukebakio 86'	Stadium: Wörthersee Stadion; Attendance: 1,200; Referee: Philip Gadler
	Penalties
	Boyamba (penalty missed); Steinhart (penalty scored); Wein (penalty scored); Skenderović (penalty scored); Lakenmacher (penalty scored)		(penalty missed) Boëtius; (penalty scored) Kenny; (penalty scored) Lukebakio; (penalty scored) Šunjić; (penalty missed) Zeefuik

20 November 2022 Wörthersee Cup Final	Austria Klagenfurt	2–1	1860 Munich	Klagenfurt am Wörthersee, Austria
16:00 CET (UTC+1)	Irving 5'; Arweiler 23'	Report	Morgalla 37'	Stadium: Wörthersee Stadion; Attendance: 1,500; Referee: Philip Gadler

16 December 2022	1860 Munich	1–0	1. FC Nürnberg	Munich
14:00 CET (UTC+1)	Lex 82'	Report		Stadium: TSV 1860 Trainingsgelände; Attendance: 400; Referee: Michael Bacher

17 December 2022	TSG 1899 Hoffenheim	3–2	1860 Munich	Hoffenheim
15:00 CET (UTC+1)	Baumgartner 1'; Angeliño 27'; Asllani 117'	Report	Bär 10'; Vrenezi 35'	Stadium: Dietmar-Hopp-Stadion; Attendance: 915; Referee: Lars Erbst

8 January 2023	1860 Munich	1–1	1. FC Kaiserslautern	Belek, Turkey
14 CET (UTC+1)	Kobylański 90+3'	Report	Redondo 56'	Stadium: Regnum Carya Golf & Spa Resort - Field 1. Attendance: 200

8 January 2023	1860 Munich	1–2	UTA Arad	Belek, Turkey
17:00 CET (UTC+1)	Skenderović 33'	Report	Batha 3'; Godwin 86'	Stadium: Regnum Carya Golf & Spa Resort - Field 2 Attendance: 100

== Competitions ==
=== Overall record ===
Competition	First match	Last match	Starting round	Final position	Record							
Competition	First match	Last match	Starting round	Final position	Pld	W	D	L	GF	GA	GD	Win %
3. Liga	23 July 2022	27 May 2023	Matchday 1	8th	38	16	9	13	61	52	+9	42.11
DFB-Pokal	29 July 2022		First round	First round	1	0	0	1	0	3	−3	0.00
Total					39	16	9	14	61	55	+6	41.03

Last updated: 27 May 2023
Source: Soccerway

=== 3. Liga ===
==== League table ====
Pos	Team	Pld	W	D	L	GF	GA	GD	Pts
6	Dynamo Dresden	38	20	9	9	65	44	+21	69
7	Waldhof Mannheim	38	19	3	16	63	65	−2	60
8	1860 Munich	38	16	9	13	61	52	+9	57
9	Viktoria Köln	38	14	13	11	58	53	+5	55
10	SC Verl	38	13	10	15	60	58	+2	49

Source: DFB
Rules for classification: 1) Points; 2) Goal difference; 3) Goals scored; 4) Head-to-head results; 5) Head-to-head away goals scored; 6) Away goals scored; 7) Play-off.

==== Results summary ====
Overall								Home						Away					
Pld	W	D	L	GF	GA	GD	Pts	W	D	L	GF	GA	GD	W	D	L	GF	GA	GD
38	16	9	13	61	52	+9	57	11	2	6	35	21	+14	5	7	7	26	31	−5

Last updated: 27 May 2023.
Source: DFB

==== Results by round ====
Round	1	2	3	4	5	6	7	8	9	10	11	12	13	14	15	16	17	18	19	20	21	22	23	24	25	26	27	28	29	30	31	32	33	34	35	36	37	38
Ground	A	H	H	A	H	A	H	A	H	A	H	A	H	A	H	A	H	A	H	H	A	A	H	A	H	A	H	A	H	A	H	A	H	A	H	A	H	A
Result	W	W	W	W	W	D	W	L	W	D	L	W	W	L	L	L	D	L	W	L	D	L	L	D	L	D	D	W	L	W	W	L	W	L	W	D	W	D
Position	3	3	1	1	1	1	1	2	2	1	2	2	2	2	2	5	6	6	5	6	6	8	8	8	8	8	9	8	9	9	8	9	9	9	8	9	8	8

Updated to match(es) played on 27 May 2023. Source: DFB
A = Away; H = Home; W = Win; D = Draw; L = Loss

==== Matches ====
The league fixtures were announced on 24 June 2022.

23 July 2022 1	Dynamo Dresden	3–4	1860 Munich	Dresden
14:00 CEST (UTC+2)	Park (yellow card) 18'; Knipping (yellow card) 68'; Borkowski 70', 82'; Schäffler 73'; Meier (yellow card) 84'	Report	Ehlers 8' (o.g.); Rieder 36'; Moll (yellow card) 51'; Bär 68', 71'; Hiller (yellow card) 90+3'	Stadium: Rudolf-Harbig-Stadion; Attendance: 24,046; Referee: Timo Gerach

6 August 2022 2	1860 Munich	1–0	VfB Oldenburg	Munich
14:00 CEST (UTC+2)	Verlaat 75'	Report	Schmidt (yellow card) 71'; Fossi (yellow card) 75'; Zietarski (yellow card) 90'	Stadium: Grünwalder Stadion; Attendance: 15,000; Referee: Cristian Ballweg

9 August 2022 3	1860 Munich	4–0	SV Meppen	Munich
19:00 CEST (UTC+2)	Kobylański 29' (yellow card) 60'; Lakenmacher 63', 66'; Lex 81'	Report	Dombrowka (yellow card) 65'; Ballmert (yellow card) 80'	Stadium: Grünwalder Stadion; Attendance: 15,000; Referee: Benjamin Brand

13 August 2022 4	SC Verl	0–1	1860 Munich	Paderborn
14:00 CEST (UTC+2)		Report	Lannert (yellow card) 36'; Deichmann (yellow card) 88'; Boyamba (yellow card) 89'; Skenderović 90+1'	Stadium: Home Deluxe Arena; Attendance: 1,537; Referee: Felix Bickel

19 August 2022 5	1860 Munich	3–1	Hallescher FC	Munich
19:00 CEST (UTC+2)	Lannert (yellow card) 15'; Kobylański 34' (yellow card) 43'; Skenderović (yellow card) 38'; Rieder (red card) 57'; Deichmann 61'; Lex (yellow card) 75'; Boyamba 80' (pen.); Vrenezi (yellow card) 85'; Moll (yellow card) 90'	Report	Deniz (yellow card) 16' (yellow-red card) 27'; Samson (yellow card) 28'; Vollert (yellow card) 50'; Damer (yellow card) 66'; Löder (yellow card) 72'; Bolyki 74'; Gebhardt (yellow card) 79'	Stadium: Grünwalder Stadion; Attendance: 15,000; Referee: Steven Greif

27 August 2022 6	Viktoria Köln	1–1	1860 Munich	Cologne
14:01 CEST (UTC+2)	Risse 24' (pen.); Sontheimer (yellow card) 54'	Report	Boyamba (yellow card) 54'; Verlaat 86'	Stadium: Sportpark Höhenberg; Attendance: 5,100; Referee: Tom Bauer

3 September 2022 7	1860 Munich	4–1	MSV Duisburg	Munich
14:00 CEST (UTC+2)	Vrenezi 2', 32'; Lakenmacher 12'; Deichmann 35'; Verlaat (yellow card) 46'	Report	Hiller 42' (o.g.); Stierlin (yellow card) 67'; Mai (yellow card) 88'	Stadium: Grünwalder Stadion; Attendance: 15,000; Referee: Marco Fritz

10 September 2022 8	SV Elversberg	4–1	1860 Munich	Spiesen-Elversberg
14:00 CEST (UTC+2)	Rochelt 13'; Pinckert 27'; Jacobsen 34' (pen.); Fellhauer (yellow card) 51'; Neubauer (yellow card) 63'; Schnellbacher 71'	Report	Deichmann (yellow card) 33'; Verlaat (yellow card) 37'; Boyamba 78'; Moll (yellow card) 87'	Stadium: Waldstadion an der Kaiserlinde; Attendance: 6,138; Referee: Dr. Arne Aarnink

16 September 2022 9	1860 Munich	3–1	Erzgebirge Aue	Munich
19:00 CEST (UTC+2)	Lakenmacher 10', 77', 84'; Wein (yellow card) 60'; Greilinger (yellow card) 70'	Report	Thiel (yellow card) 50'; Knezevic (yellow card) 57'; Besong (yellow card) 86'; Burger (yellow card) 89'; Schikora 90+1'	Stadium: Grünwalder Stadion; Attendance: 15,000; Referee: Patrick Alt

1 October 2022 10	Borussia Dortmund II	1–1	1860 Munich	Dortmund
14:00 CEST (UTC+2)	Michel (yellow card) 42'; Özkan (yellow card) 43'; Pašalić (yellow card) 55' (goal) 68'; Eberwein (yellow card) 77'	Report	Deichmann (yellow card) 48'; Vrenezi 62' (pen.)	Stadium: Stadion Rote Erde; Attendance: 4,056; Referee: Patrick Schwengers

8 October 2022 11	1860 Munich	1–2	Ingolstadt 04	Munich
14:00 CEST (UTC+2)	Tallig (yellow card) 37'; Wein (yellow card) 81'; Rieder (yellow card) 85'; Skenderović 90+3'	Report	Kopacz (yellow card) 9'; Costly 15'; Llugiqi (yellow card) 41'; Doumbouya (yellow card) 54'; Preißinger (yellow card) 65'; Bech (yellow card) 72'; Butler (yellow card) 74'; Schmidt 88'	Stadium: Grünwalder Stadion; Attendance: 15,000; Referee: Benjamin Brand

15 October 2022 12	VfL Osnabrück	0–2	1860 Munich	Osnabrück
14:00 CEST (UTC+2)	Gyamfi (yellow card) 85'	Report	Verlaat 7'; Vrenezi (yellow card) 43'; Steinhart (yellow card) 64'; Lakenmacher (yellow card) 73'; Skenderović 82'	Stadium: Stadion an der Bremer Brücke; Attendance: 13,796; Referee: Richard Hempel

22 October 2022 13	1860 Munich	3–1	Wehen Wiesbaden	Munich
14:00 CEST (UTC+2)	Skenderović (yellow card) 32' (goal) 79'; Deichmann 54'; Rieder 80'	Report	Wurtz (yellow card) 45+3'; Taffertshofer (yellow card) 70'; Najar 90+2'	Stadium: Grünwalder Stadion; Attendance: 15,000; Referee: Mitja Stegemann

29 October 2022 14	SpVgg Bayreuth	1–0	1860 Munich	Bayreuth
14:00 CEST (UTC+2)	George 41'; Stockinger (yellow card) 42'; Weber (yellow card) 49'; Heinrich (yellow card) 62'	Report	Boyamba (yellow card) 77'	Stadium: Hans-Walter-Wild-Stadion; Attendance: 12,000; Referee: Deniz Aytekin

6 November 2022 15	1860 Munich	0–1	1. FC Saarbrücken	Munich
15:00 CET (UTC+1)	Wein (yellow card) 59'; Verlaat (yellow card) 61'; Steinhart (yellow card) 77'; Bär (yellow card) 87'	Report	Çuni 47'	Stadium: Grünwalder Stadion; Attendance: 15,000; Referee: Dr. Robin Braun

9 November 2022 16	SC Freiburg II	2–0	1860 Munich	Freiburg im Breisgau
19:00 CET (UTC+1)	Kehl 5' (yellow card) 60'; Baur 64'; Furrer (yellow card) 90+2'	Report		Stadium: Dreisamstadion; Attendance: 5,700; Referee: Patrick Kessel

14 November 2022 17	1860 Munich	1–1	Rot-Weiss Essen	Munich
19:00 CET (UTC+1)	Vrenezi 76' (pen.)	Report	Götze (yellow card) 64'; Tarnat (yellow card) 70'; Herzenbruch (yellow card) 76'; Bastians 90+1'	Stadium: Grünwalder Stadion; Attendance: 15,000; Referee: Patrick Alt

14 January 2023 18	Waldhof Mannheim	3–1	1860 Munich	Mannheim
14:00 CET (UTC+1)	Sohm 28', 58'; Seegert (yellow card) 31'; Rossipal (yellow card) 76'; Kother 90+5'	Report	Steinhart 7' (yellow card) 90'; Rieder (yellow card) 63'	Stadium: Carl-Benz-Stadion; Attendance: 17,500; Referee: Tobias Stieler

21 January 2023 19	1860 Munich	3–1	FSV Zwickau	Munich
14:00 CET (UTC+1)	Holzhauser 1' (yellow card) 62'; Lakenmacher 7'; Deichmann (yellow card) 17'; Kobylański 42' (yellow card) 76'	Report	Baumann 56'; Jansen (yellow card) 62'; Göbel (yellow card) 76'; Frick (yellow card) 79'	Stadium: Grünwalder Stadion; Attendance: 15,000; Referee: Tom Bauer

30 January 2023 20	1860 Munich	1–2	Dynamo Dresden	Munich
19:00 CET (UTC+1)	Vrenezi 5'; Belkahia (yellow card) 33'; Steinhart (yellow card) 43'; Deichmann (yellow card) 73'; Rieder (yellow card) 87'	Report	Knipping (yellow card) 14'; Borkowski (yellow card) 25' (goal) 75'; Schäffler (yellow card) 26'; Kutschke 56'; Conteh (yellow card) 63'; Arslan (yellow card) 68'; Melichenko (yellow card) 90'	Stadium: Grünwalder Stadion; Attendance: 15,000; Referee: Tobias Reichel

5 February 2023 21	VfB Oldenburg	2–2	1860 Munich	Oldenburg
13:00 CET (UTC+1)	Badjie (yellow card) 38'; Starke 90'; Richter 90+3'	Report	Rieder (yellow card) 5'; Moll (yellow card) 45'; Tallig 58'; Steinhart (yellow card) 66'; Bär 82'	Stadium: Marschweg-Stadion; Attendance: 6,200; Referee: Patrick Schwengers

11 February 2023 22	SV Meppen	2–1	1860 Munich	Meppen
14:00 CET (UTC+1)	Janssen 19' (yellow card) 29'; Álvarez 59' (yellow card) 87'	Report	Bär 45+2'; Moll (yellow card) 56'; Holzhauser (yellow card) 58'	Stadium: Hänsch-Arena; Attendance: 7,735; Referee: Marc Philip Eckermann

19 February 2023 23	1860 Munich	0–3	SC Verl	Munich
13:00 CET (UTC+1)	Tallig (yellow card) 80'; Wein (yellow card) 81'	Report	Wolfram (yellow card) 23' (goal) 52'; Stellwagen 58'; Tugbenyo 78'; Wosz 90+1'	Stadium: Grünwalder Stadion; Attendance: 15,000; Referee: Patrick Kessel

24 February 2023 24	Hallescher FC	0–0	1860 Munich	Halle
19:00 CET (UTC+1)	Bolyki (yellow card) 53'	Report	Verlaat (yellow card) 20'; Lannert (yellow card) 67'; Steinhart (yellow card) 75'	Stadium: Leuna-Chemie-Stadion; Attendance: 8,582; Referee: Richard Hempel

4 March 2023 25	1860 Munich	0–1	Viktoria Köln	Munich
14:00 CET (UTC+1)	Verlaat (yellow card) 79'	Report	Philipp 41'; Sontheimer (yellow card) 44'; Fritz (yellow card) 58'; Becker (yellow card) 89'	Stadium: Grünwalder Stadion; Attendance: 15,000; Referee: Luca Jürgensen

11 March 2023 26	MSV Duisburg	2–2	1860 Munich	Duisburg
14:00 CET (UTC+1)	Senger (yellow card) 33'; Hettwer 77'; Bakir 80'; Frey (yellow card) 85'	Report	Boyamba 61'; Fleckstein 72' (o.g.); Bär (yellow card) 86'	Stadium: MSV-Arena; Attendance: 12,388; Referee: Lars Erbst

14 March 2023 27	1860 Munich	1–1	SV Elversberg	Munich
19:00 CET (UTC+1)	Boyamba 34'; Vrenezi (yellow card) 52'; Deichmann (yellow card) 56'; Moll (yellow card) 86'; Skenderović 88'	Report	Antonitsch 18'	Stadium: Grünwalder Stadion; Attendance: 15,000; Referee: Cristian Ballweg

18 March 2023 28	Erzgebirge Aue	1–3	1860 Munich	Aue
14:00 CET (UTC+1)	Jonjić (yellow card) 19'; Danhof (yellow card) 22'; Sijarić (yellow card) 28'; Besong 71'	Report	Lex 16', 60' (yellow card) 38'; Vrenezi 36'; Boyamba (yellow card) 41'; Verlaat (yellow card) 45'	Stadium: Erzgebirgsstadion; Attendance: 10,869; Referee: Konrad Oldhafer

26 March 2023 29	1860 Munich	1–4	Borussia Dortmund II	Munich
13:00 CEST (UTC+2)	Vrenezi (yellow card) 61'; Holzhauser 85' (pen.)	Report	Pohlmann 5', 15'; Pudel 17' (yellow card) 87'; Lotka (yellow card) 72'; Michel (yellow card) 74'; Kamara 79'; Dams (yellow card) 85'	Stadium: Grünwalder Stadion; Attendance: 15,000; Referee: Nico Fuchs

3 April 2025 30	Ingolstadt 04	1–3	1860 Munich	Ingolstadt
19:00 CEST (UTC+2)	Schröck (yellow card) 2'; Brackelmann (yellow card) 28'; Testroet 73'	Report	Lex 16', 34' (yellow card) 69'; Morgalla (yellow card) 30'; Bär 49'	Stadium: Audi Sportpark; Attendance: 13,218; Referee: Benjamin Cortus

8 April 2023 31	1860 Munich	3–0	VfL Osnabrück	Munich
14:00 CEST (UTC+2)	Boyamba 39', 70'; Verlaat 89'	Report	Haas (yellow card) 45'; Gyamfi (yellow card) 50'; Niemann (red card) 74'	Stadium: Grünwalder Stadion; Attendance: 15,000; Referee: Patrick Kessel

15 April 2023 32	Wehen Wiesbaden	2–0	1860 Munich	Wiesbaden
14:00 CEST (UTC+2)	Fechner 10'; Prtajin 84' (yellow card) 85'	Report	Steinhart (yellow card) 69'; Lang (yellow card) 90+3'	Stadium: Brita-Arena; Attendance: 6,519; Referee: Lars Erbst

22 April 2023 33	1860 Munich	2–0	SpVgg Bayreuth	Munich
14:00 CEST (UTC+2)	Eder 8' (o.g.); Moll (yellow card) 49'; Verlaat (yellow card) 77'; Lex 82'; Wörl (yellow card) 90+2'	Report	Kirsch (yellow card) 35'	Stadium: Grünwalder Stadion; Attendance: 15,000; Referee: Benjamin Cortus

30 April 2023 34	1. FC Saarbrücken	2–0	1860 Munich	Saarbrücken
14:00 CEST (UTC+2)	Günther-Schmidt 24'; Gaus 34' (yellow card) 57'; Zeitz (yellow card) 53'; Gnaase (yellow card) 86'	Report	Lakenmacher (yellow card) 27'; Verlaat (yellow card) 32'; Kobylański (yellow card) 63'	Stadium: Ludwigsparkstadion; Attendance: 14,617; Referee: Dr. Florian Exner

6 May 2023 35	1860 Munich	1–0	SC Freiburg II	Munich
14:00 CEST (UTC+2)	Holzhauser (yellow card) 11' (goal) 45+1'; Greilinger (yellow card) 47'; Kretzschmar (yellow card) 70'; Belkahia (yellow card) 90+3'	Report	Guttau (yellow card) 29'; Breunig (yellow card) 82'	Stadium: Grünwalder Stadion; Attendance: 15,000; Referee: Lukas Benen

14 May 2023 36	Rot-Weiss Essen	2–2	1860 Munich	Essen
13:00 CEST (UTC+2)	Plechaty (yellow card) 13'; Harenbrock 21'; Engelmann 90+4'	Report	Verlaat (yellow card) 46'; Deichmann 64'; Greilinger 84'; Steinhart (yellow card) 87'	Stadium: Stadion an der Hafenstraße; Attendance: 18,187; Referee: Patrick Schwengers

19 May 2023 37	1860 Munich	3–1	Waldhof Mannheim	Munich
19:00 CEST (UTC+2)	Verlaat (yellow card) 10' (goal) 42'; Lex 14'; Lakenmacher 37' (yellow card) 64'; Belkahia (yellow card) 56'	Report	Wagner (yellow card) 40'; Bahn 85' (pen.)	Stadium: Grünwalder Stadion; Attendance: 15,000; Referee: Mitja Stegemann

27 May 2023 38	FSV Zwickau	2–2	1860 Munich	Zwickau
13:30 CEST (UTC+2)	Gomez 65'; Greilinger 88' (o.g.)	Report	Bär 48'; Lang (yellow card) 59'; Ćoćić 89'	Stadium: Stadion Zwickau; Attendance: 6,264; Referee: Felix Bickel

=== DFB-Pokal ===
29 July 2022 First Round	1860 Munich	0–3	Borussia Dortmund	Munich
20:46 CEST (UTC+2)	Lannert (yellow card) 12'; Lang (yellow card) 74'	Report	Malen 8'; Bellingham 31'; Adeyemi 35'	Stadium: Grünwalder Stadion; Attendance: 15,000; Referee: Benjamin Brand

== Squad statistics ==
=== Appearances and goals ===
As of match played 27 May 2023

Players with no appearances are not included on the list
Italics indicate a loaned in player

No.	Pos	Nat	Player	Total		3. Liga		DFB-Pokal	
No.	Pos	Nat	Player	Apps	Goals	Apps	Goals	Apps	Goals
1	GK	(Germany) GER	Marco Hiller	35	0	34	0	1	0
3	DF	(Germany) GER	Niklas Lang	16	0	11+4	0	0+1	0
4	DF	(Netherlands) NED	Jesper Verlaat	37	0	34+2	0	1	0
5	MF	(Germany) GER	Quirin Moll	21	0	11+10	0	0	0
6	MF	(Germany) GER	Tim Rieder	23	0	20+2	0	1	0
7	FW	(Germany) GER	Stefan Lex	33	0	26+6	0	1	0
8	MF	(Germany) GER	Erik Tallig	21	0	8+12	0	1	0
9	FW	(Kosovo) KOS	Albion Vrenezi	34	0	28+5	0	0+1	0
10	MF	(Poland) POL	Martin Kobylański	24	0	11+12	0	0+1	0
11	MF	(Germany) GER	Fabian Greilinger	21	0	12+9	0	0	0
13	MF	(Germany) GER	Alexander Freitag	1	0	0+1	0	0	0
14	FW	(Montenegro) MNE	Meris Skenderović	28	0	10+17	0	0+1	0
15	MF	(Germany) GER	Marcel Bär	26	0	16+9	0	1	0
17	DF	(Germany) GER	Daniel Wein	12	0	6+6	0	0	0
19	FW	(Germany) GER	Fynn Lakenmacher	36	0	21+14	0	1	0
20	MF	(Germany) GER	Yannick Deichmann	35	0	33+1	0	1	0
22	DF	(Germany) GER	Christopher Lannert	30	0	18+11	0	1	0
24	MF	(Switzerland) SUI	Nathan Wicht	1	0	0+1	0	0	0
25	DF	(Germany) GER	Marius Willsch	6	0	1+5	0	0	0
26	MF	(Austria) AUT	Raphael Holzhauser	14	0	9+5	0	0	0
27	DF	(Germany) GER	Semi Belkahia	21	0	13+8	0	0	0
30	MF	(Serbia) SRB	Miloš Ćoćić	4	0	1+3	0	0	0
33	MF	(Germany) GER	Joseph Boyamba	33	0	21+12	0	0	0
35	DF	(Austria) AUT	Michael Glück	1	0	0+1	0	0	0
36	DF	(Germany) GER	Phillipp Steinhart	27	0	26	0	1	0
38	MF	(Germany) GER	Marius Wörl	18	0	15+3	0	0	0
39	DF	(Germany) GER	Leandro Morgalla	32	0	29+2	0	1	0
40	GK	(Germany) GER	Tom Kretzschmar	4	0	4	0	0	0
Players away on loan:
32	FW	(Togo) TOG	Mansour Ouro-Tagba	1	0	0+1	0	0	0
Players who featured but departed the club permanently during the season:

=== Goal scorers ===
As of match played 27 May 2023

Place	Position	Nation	Number	Name	3. Liga	DFB-Pokal	Total
1	FW	(Germany)	19	Fynn Lakenmacher	8	0	8
2	FW	(Germany)	7	Stefan Lex	7	0	7
3	FW	(Kosovo)	9	Albion Vrenezi	6	0	6
3	MF	(Germany)	33	Joseph Boyamba	6	0	6
3	MF	(Germany)	15	Marcel Bär	6	0	6
6	DF	(Netherlands)	4	Jesper Verlaat	5	0	5
7	FW	(Montenegro)	14	Meris Skenderović	4	0	4
7	MF	(Germany)	20	Yannick Deichmann	4	0	4
9	MF	(Poland)	10	Martin Kobylański	3	0	3
9	MF	(Austria)	26	Raphael Holzhauser	3	0	3
9				Own goal	3	0	3
12	MF	(Germany)	6	Tim Rieder	2	0	2
13	DF	(Germany)	36	Phillipp Steinhart	1	0	1
13	MF	(Germany)	8	Erik Tallig	1	0	1
13	MF	(Germany)	11	Fabian Greilinger	1	0	1
13	MF	(Serbia)	30	Miloš Ćoćić	1	0	1
Total					61	0	61

=== Clean sheets ===
As of match played 27 May 2023

Place	Position	Nation	Number	Name	3. Liga	DFB-Pokal	Total
1	GK	(Germany)	1	Marco Hiller	8	0	8
Total					8	0	8

=== Disciplinary record ===
As of match played 27 May 2023

Number	Nation	Position	Name	3. Liga		DFB-Pokal		Total	
Number	Nation	Position	Name	Yellow card	Red card	Yellow card	Red card	Yellow card	Red card
1	(Germany)	GK	Marco Hiller	1	0	0	0	1	0
3	(Germany)	DF	Niklas Lang	3	0	1	0	4	0
4	(Netherlands)	DF	Jesper Verlaat	10	0	0	0	10	0
5	(Germany)	MF	Quirin Moll	7	0	0	0	7	0
6	(Germany)	MF	Tim Rieder	4	1	0	0	4	1
7	(Germany)	FW	Stefan Lex	3	0	0	0	3	0
8	(Germany)	MF	Erik Tallig	2	0	0	0	2	0
9	(Kosovo)	FW	Albion Vrenezi	4	0	0	0	4	0
10	(Poland)	MF	Martin Kobylański	4	0	0	0	4	0
11	(Germany)	MF	Fabian Greilinger	2	0	0	0	2	0
14	(Montenegro)	FW	Meris Skenderović	3	0	0	0	3	0
15	(Germany)	MF	Marcel Bär	2	0	0	0	2	0
17	(Germany)	DF	Daniel Wein	4	0	0	0	4	0
19	(Germany)	FW	Fynn Lakenmacher	3	0	0	0	3	0
20	(Germany)	MF	Yannick Deichmann	6	0	0	0	6	0
22	(Germany)	DF	Christopher Lannert	3	0	1	0	4	0
26	(Austria)	MF	Raphael Holzhauser	3	0	0	0	3	0
27	(Germany)	DF	Semi Belkahia	3	0	0	0	3	0
33	(Germany)	MF	Joseph Boyamba	4	0	0	0	4	0
36	(Germany)	DF	Phillipp Steinhart	8	0	0	0	8	0
39	(Germany)	DF	Leandro Morgalla	1	0	0	0	1	0
40	(Germany)	GK	Tom Kretzschmar	1	0	0	0	1	0
Players away on loan:
Players who left 1860 Munich during the season:
32	(Togo)	FW	Mansour Ouro-Tagba	1	0	0	0	1	0
Total				82	1	2	0	84	1
