= Tom Kretzschmar =

German footballer

Personal information
- Date of birth: 19 January 1999 (age 27)
- Place of birth: Munich, Germany
- Height: 1.85 m (6 ft 1 in)
- Position: Goalkeeper

Team information
- Current team: Wacker Burghausen
- Number: 30

Youth career
- –2006: SpVgg Höhenkirchen
- 2006–2017: 1860 Munich

Senior career*
Years	Team	Apps	(Gls)
2017–2022	1860 Munich II	40	(0)
2021–2023	1860 Munich	8	(0)
2023–2025	FC Homburg	54	(0)
2025–	Wacker Burghausen	1	(0)
- * Club domestic league appearances and goals as of 28 June 2026

Tom Kretzschmar (born 19 January 1999) is a German professional footballer who plays as a goalkeeper for Wacker Burghausen in the Regionalliga Bayern.

== Career ==
Born in Munich, Kretzschmar joined 1860 Munich's youth academy from SpVgg Höhenkirchen in 2006. He made his senior debut for 1860 Munich II in the Bayernliga Süd in July 2017. In February 2021, he extended his contract with the club. He made his first-team debut on 22 May 2021 a substitute after goalkeeper Marco Hiller was sent-off in the 8th-minute of a 3–1 defeat to FC Ingolstadt.

On 25 June 2023, Kretzschmar signed a two-year contract with FC Homburg in Regionalliga.

== Career statistics ==
As of match played 27 May 2023

Appearances and goals by club, season and competition
Club	Season	League			Cup		Total	
Club	Season	Division	Apps	Goals	Apps	Goals	Apps	Goals
1860 Munich II	2017–18	Bayernliga Süd	12	0	—		12	0
1860 Munich II	2018–19	Bayernliga Süd	17	0	—		17	0
1860 Munich II	2019–21	Bayernliga Süd	11	0	—		11	0
1860 Munich II	2022–23	Bayernliga Süd	1	0	—		1	0
1860 Munich II	Total		41	0	—		41	0
1860 Munich	2020–21	3. Liga	1	0	0	0	1	0
1860 Munich	2021–22	3. Liga	3	0	0	0	3	0
1860 Munich	2022–23	3. Liga	4	0	0	0	4	0
1860 Munich	Total		8	0	0	0	8	0
FC Homburg	2023–24	Regionalliga Südwest	0	0	0	0	0	0
Career Total			49	0	0	0	49	0
