= 1983 DFB-Pokal final =

- Match programme cover
- Event: 1982–83 DFB-Pokal
1. FC Köln	Fortuna Köln
1	0
- Date: 11 June 1983
- Venue: Müngersdorfer Stadion, Cologne
- Referee: Walter Engel (Reimsbach)
- Attendance: 61,000

The 1983 DFB-Pokal final decided the winner of the 1982–83 DFB-Pokal, the 40th season of Germany's knockout football cup competition. It was played on 11 June 1983, and was the first and to date the only cup final between two teams from the same city, which was contested between Cologne clubs 1. FC Köln, playing in the Bundesliga, and Fortuna Köln, playing in the 2. Bundesliga. Fittingy, the match took place in Cologne, at the Müngersdorfer Stadion. 1. FC Köln won the derby match 1–0 to claim their 4th cup title.

== Route to the final ==
The DFB-Pokal began with 64 teams in a single-elimination knockout cup competition. There were a total of five rounds leading up to the final. Teams were drawn against each other, and the winner after 90 minutes would advance. If still tied, 30 minutes of extra time was played. If the score was still level, a replay would take place at the original away team's stadium. If still level after 90 minutes, 30 minutes of extra time was played. If the score was still level, a penalty shoot-out was used to determine the winner.

Note: In all results below, the score of the finalist is given first (H: home; A: away).

1. FC Köln		Round	Fortuna Köln
Opponent	Result	1982–83 DFB-Pokal	Opponent	Result
Bayer Uerdingen (H)	3–1	Round 1	SC Freiburg (H)	2–0
Bayer Leverkusen (H)	3–1	Round 2	SSV Ulm (A) (H)	0–0 (a.e.t.); 3–0 (replay)
Stuttgarter Kickers (H)	5–1	Round of 16	Eintracht Braunschweig (A)	2–1
Schalke 04 (H)	5–0	Quarter-finals	Borussia Mönchengladbach (A) (H)	2–2 (a.e.t.); 2–1 (replay)
VfB Stuttgart (H)	3–2 (a.e.t.)	Semi-finals	Borussia Dortmund (H)	5–0

== Match ==
=== Details ===
11 June 1983
16:00 CEST

1. FC Köln	1–0	Fortuna Köln
Littbarski 68'	Report

Müngersdorfer Stadion, Cologne
Attendance: 61,000
Referee: Walter Engel (Reimsbach)

1. FC Köln	Fortuna Köln

GK	1	(West Germany) Harald Schumacher
RB	2	(West Germany) Dieter Prestin
CB	4	(West Germany) Gerd Strack (c)
CB	5	(West Germany) Paul Steiner
LB	3	(West Germany) Herbert Zimmermann
CM	6	(West Germany) Harald Konopka	(substituted off) 81'
CM	8	(West Germany) Herbert Neumann
CM	10	(West Germany) Stephan Engels
RW	7	(West Germany) Pierre Littbarski
CF	9	(West Germany) Klaus Fischer
LW	11	(West Germany) Klaus Allofs	(substituted off) 90'
Substitutes:
DF	12	(West Germany) Holger Willmer	(substituted on) 81'
FW	14	(West Germany) Frank Hartmann	(substituted on) 90'
Manager:
(Netherlands) Rinus Michels

GK	1	(West Germany) Bernd Helmschrot
RB	7	(West Germany) Florian Hinterberger
CB	2	(West Germany) Michael Kuntze
CB	5	(West Germany) Dieter Finkler (c)
LB	3	(West Germany) Jürgen Baier
CM	4	(West Germany) Hermann-Josef Werres	(substituted off) 71'
CM	6	(West Germany) Hans-Jürgen Gede
CM	8	(West Germany) Johannes Linßen
RW	10	(West Germany) Bernd Grabosch
CF	9	(West Germany) Dieter Schatzschneider
LW	11	(West Germany) Dieter Lemke
Substitutes:
MF	14	(West Germany) Robert Hanschitz	(substituted on) 71'
Manager:
(West Germany) Martin Luppen

Match rules

- 90 minutes.
- 30 minutes of extra time if necessary.
- Penalty shoot-out if scores still level.
- Maximum of two substitutions.
