= Willsch =

Willsch is a surname. Notable people with the surname include:

- Klaus-Peter Willsch (born 1961), German politician
- Marius Willsch (born 1991), German footballer
