= Leandro Morgalla =

German footballer (born 2004)

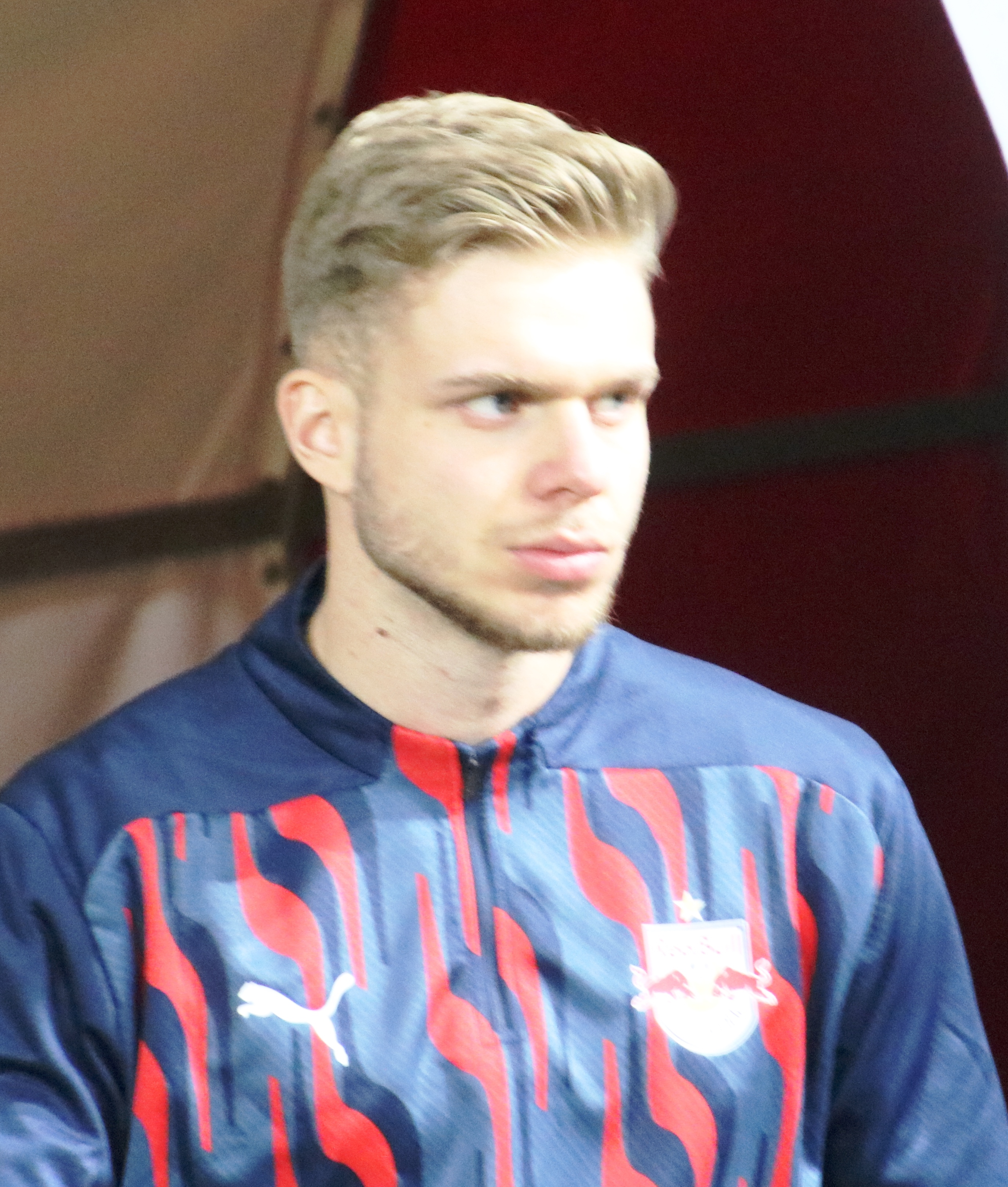
- Morgalla with Red Bull Salzburg in 2025

Personal information
- Date of birth: 13 September 2004 (age 22)
- Place of birth: Biedenkopf, Germany
- Height: 1.86 m (6 ft 1 in)
- Position: Defender

Team information
- Current team: Red Bull Salzburg
- Number: 39

Youth career
- SpVgg Unterhaching
- 2014–2021: 1860 Munich

Senior career*
Years	Team	Apps	(Gls)
2021–2022	1860 Munich II	3	(0)
2022–2023	1860 Munich	42	(0)
2023–	Red Bull Salzburg	24	(0)
2023–2024	FC Liefering	5	(0)
2025–2026	→ VfL Bochum (loan)	33	(1)

International career^{‡}
2021–2022	Germany U18	5	(0)
2022–2023	Germany U19	5	(1)
2023–	Germany U21	12	(0)
- * Club domestic league appearances and goals as of 25 October 2026 ‡ National team caps and goals as of 20:35, 17 November 2026 (UTC)

Leandro Morgalla (born 13 September 2004) is a German professional footballer who plays as a defender for Austrian Bundesliga club Red Bull Salzburg.

== Club career ==
Having joined 1860 Munich's academy from SpVgg Unterhaching aged 10, he made his first team debut for the club as a substitute in a 1–0 3. Liga win over Viktoria Köln. On 23 June 2023, Morgalla signed with Austrian Bundesliga club Red Bull Salzburg, on a five-year deal and was initially assigned to play for FC Liefering.

Morgalla made his European debut on 29 November 2023, during a UEFA Champions League group stage match against Spanish La Liga club Real Sociedad, coming on as a half-time substitute for Strahinja Pavlović.

On 26 May 2025, he returned to his native Germany and joined 2. Bundesliga club VfL Bochum, on loan for the 2025–26 season.

== International career ==
Morgalla represented Germany at under-18, under-19 and under-21 levels.

== Career statistics ==
As of match played 25 October 2026

Appearances and goals by club, season and competition
Club	Season	League			National cup (Note: Includes DFB-Pokal, Austrian Cup)		Europe		Other		Total	
Club	Season	Division	Apps	Goals	Apps	Goals	Apps	Goals	Apps	Goals	Apps	Goals
1860 Munich II	2021–22	Bayernliga	3	0	—		—		—		3	0
1860 Munich	2021–22	3. Liga	11	0	—		—		—		11	0
1860 Munich	2022–23	3. Liga	31	0	2	0	—		—		33	0
1860 Munich	Total		42	0	2	0	—		—		44	0
Red Bull Salzburg	2023–24	Austrian Bundesliga	3	0	1	0	1 (Note: Appearances in UEFA Champions League)	0	—		5	0
Red Bull Salzburg	2024–25	Austrian Bundesliga	16	0	3	0	3	0	0	0	22	0
Red Bull Salzburg	2026–27	Austrian Bundesliga	5	0	1	0	3 (Note: Appearances in UEFA Europa League)	0	—		9	0
Red Bull Salzburg	Total		24	0	5	0	7	0	0	0	36	0
FC Liefering	2023–24	2. Liga	4	0	—		—		—		4	0
FC Liefering	2024–25	2. Liga	1	0	—		—		—		1	0
FC Liefering	Total		5	0	—		—		—		5	0
VfL Bochum (loan)	2025–26	2. Bundesliga	33	0	2	0	—		—		35	0
Career total			104	0	9	0	7	0	0	0	120	0
