= Lorenz Knöferl =

German footballer (born 2003)

Personal information
- Date of birth: 4 May 2003 (age 23)
- Place of birth: Dachau, Germany
- Height: 1.79 m (5 ft 10 in)
- Position: Forward

Team information
- Current team: 1860 Munich II

Youth career
- TSV Hilgertshausen
- JFG TaF Glonntal
- 2014-2020: 1860 Munich Academy

Senior career*
Years	Team	Apps	(Gls)
2020–	1860 Munich	12	(1)
2021–	1860 Munich II	20	(7)
2023	→ Carl Zeiss Jena (loan)	13	(0)

International career
2018	Germany U16	3	(0)
- * Club domestic league appearances and goals as of 28 May 2023

Lorenz Knöferl (born 4 May 2003) is a German professional footballer who plays as a forward for 1860 Munich II.

== Club career ==
=== Early life and youth career ===
Lorenz grew up in Alberzell, Bavaria. He began his youth career at TSV Hilgertshausen before moving to JFG TaF Glonntal. He then moved to the academy of TSV 1860 Munich in 2014, and had featured for the club in their under 12 and under 15 division.

=== 1860 Munich ===
Lorenz signed his first senior contract with TSV 1860 Munich. He made his debut on 12 December 2020 against Waldhof Mannheim as a substitute for Stefan Lex on 72 minute of the game. The match ended 5–0 with 1860 Munich taking the win. Lorenz played the next against 1. FC Kaiserslautern on 15 December 2020 as a substitute for Fabian Greilinger. The match ended on a 3–0 scoreline with 1860 Munich taking the three points. Lorenz came in as a substitute for Dennis Dressel in the next match on 18 December 2020 against SV Wehen Wiesbaden, where he scored his debut goal for 1860 Munich and his maiden senior career goal in less than one minute after coming into the pitch in 83rd minute, thereby taking the match to a 2–2 draw. Lorenz thus became the youngest goal scorer in the history of 1860 Munich.

==== Loan to Carl Zeiss Jena ====
On 31 January 2023, Knöferl was loaned by Carl Zeiss Jena in Regionalliga Nordost. In a state cup match against ZFC Meuselwitz, Knöferl was in an emergency situation when he swallowed his tongue. He finished his time at Carl Zeiss Jena with 13 appearances.

== International career ==
Lorenz was called up for Germany U16 national team on 2018. He made his debut against Austria U16 on 9 September 2018. He made three appearances for the national team in 2018.

== Personal life ==
Lorenz is a fan of French striker Kylian Mbappé.

== Career statistics ==
As of match played 21 May 2023

Appearances and goals by club, season and competition
Club	Season	League			National Cup		Total	
Club	Season	Division	Apps	Goals	Apps	Goals	Apps	Goals
1860 Munich	2020–21	3. Liga	9	1	0	0	9	1
1860 Munich	2021–22	3. Liga	3	0	0	0	3	0
1860 Munich	Total		12	1	0	0	12	1
1860 Munich II	2021–22	Bayernliga Süd	7	5	—		7	5
1860 Munich II	2022–23	Bayernliga Süd	13	2	—		13	2
1860 Munich II	2023–24	Bayernliga Süd	0	0	—		0	0
1860 Munich II	Total		20	7	—		20	7
Carl Zeiss Jena (loan)	2022–23	Regionalliga Nordost	13	0	0	0	13	0
Career Total			45	8	0	0	45	8
