= Daniel Hofstetter =

German footballer

Personal information
- Date of birth: 4 July 1992 (age 34)
- Place of birth: Ebersberg, West Germany
- Position: Centre back

Team information
- Current team: TSV Ampfing
- Number: 25

Youth career
- VfL Waldkraiburg
- Wacker Burghausen
- –2010: 1860 Munich

Senior career*
Years	Team	Apps	(Gls)
2010–2012	1860 Munich II	43	(0)
2012–2014	SpVgg Unterhaching	49	(0)
2014–2015	Eintracht Bamberg	18	(1)
2015–2019	Wacker Burghausen	110	(3)
2019–	TSV Ampfing	12	(3)

International career
- Germany Youth
- * Club domestic league appearances and goals as of 23:26, 30 January 2021 (UTC)

Daniel Hofstetter (born 4 July 1992) is a German footballer who plays as a defender. He currently plays for TSV Ampfing.

== Career ==
Hofstetter began his career with 1860 Munich, and was promoted to the reserve team in 2010. He played 43 times in the Regionalliga Süd over the next two years, and was given a squad number for the first-team but didn't make any appearances. In July 2012 he signed for SpVgg Unterhaching of the 3. Liga, alongside team-mates Marcel Kappelmaier and Marius Willsch. He left Unterhaching after two seasons.
