= Johann Ngounou Djayo =

German footballer

Personal information
- Date of birth: 27 February 2001 (age 25)
- Place of birth: Dachau, Germany
- Height: 1.87 m (6 ft 2 in)
- Position: Forward

Team information
- Current team: Wacker Burghausen
- Number: 28

Youth career
- –2014: TSV Dachau
- 2014–2020: 1860 Munich

Senior career*
Years	Team	Apps	(Gls)
2018–2022	1860 Munich II	12	(1)
2020–2022	1860 Munich	10	(0)
2022–	Wacker Burghausen	0	(0)

International career^{‡}
2018	Germany U18	2	(0)
- * Club domestic league appearances and goals as of 1 July 2022 ‡ National team caps and goals as of 18:31, 15 September 2020 (UTC)

Johann Ngounou Djayo (born 27 February 2001) is a German professional footballer who plays as a forward for Wacker Burghausen.

== Career ==
Ngounou Djayo made his professional debut for 1860 Munich in the final of the 2019–20 Bavarian Cup on 5 September 2020, starting against Würzburger Kickers, who had been promoted from the 3. Liga to the 2. Bundesliga at the end of the season, before being substituted out in the 63rd minute for Fabian Greilinger. The home match finished as a 4–1 on penalties for 1860 following a 1–1 draw after 90 minutes.
