= 1986–87 Bayer 04 Leverkusen season =

Bayer 04 Leverkusen
1986-87 season
- Manager: Erich Ribbeck
- Stadium: Ulrich-Haberland-Stadion
- Bundesliga: 6th
- DFB-Pokal: Second round
- UEFA Cup: Second round
- Top goalscorer: League: Herbert Waas (15 goals); All: Herbert Waas (18 goals)

In the 1986–87 season, Bayer 04 Leverkusen ended in sixth place with 39 points, earning a spot in the 1987-88 UEFA Cup, which they'd win.

It was the club's 8th consecutive season in the Bundesliga, having been promoted to the top flight after winning the 1979-80 2. Bundesliga.

== Squad ==
Note: Flags indicate national team as defined under FIFA eligibility rules; some limited exceptions apply. Players may hold more than one non-FIFA nationality.

No.	Pos.	Nation	Player
—	GK	GER	Bernd Dreher
—	GK	GER	Rüdiger Vollborn
—	DF	BEL	Jean-Pierre de Keyser
—	DF	GER	Thomas Hörster
—	DF	GER	Alois Reinhardt
—	DF	GER	Peter Zanter
—	MF	GER	Günter Drews
—	MF	GRE	Minas Hantzidis
—	MF	GER	Christian Hausmann
—	MF	GER	Florian Hinterberger
—	MF	GER	Jürgen Luginger
—	MF	GER	Wolfgang Patzke
—	MF	GER	Dirk Rehbein
—	MF	GER	Knut Reinhardt
—	MF	GER	Wolfgang Rolff
—	MF	GER	Thomas Zechel

No.	Pos.	Nation	Player
—	FW	KOR	Cha Bum-Kun
—	FW	GER	Falko Götz
—	FW	GER	Stefan Kohn
—	FW	GER	Christian Schreier
—	FW	GER	Herbert Waas

== Competitions ==
=== Bundesliga ===
==== League table ====
Pos	Team	Pld	W	D	L	GF	GA	GD	Pts	Qualification or relegation
4	Borussia Dortmund	34	15	10	9	70	50	+20	40	Qualification to UEFA Cup first round (Note: As Hamburger SV qualified for the Cup Winners' Cup, their UEFA Cup spot was transferred to Leverkusen.)
5	Werder Bremen	34	17	6	11	65	54	+11	40	Qualification to UEFA Cup first round
6	Bayer Leverkusen	34	16	7	11	56	38	+18	39	Qualification to UEFA Cup first round
7	1. FC Kaiserslautern	34	15	7	12	64	51	+13	37	
8	Bayer 05 Uerdingen	34	12	11	11	51	49	+2	35	

Source: www.dfb.de
Rules for classification: 1) points; 2) goal difference; 3) number of goals scored.
Notes:

1	v

2	v

3	v

4	v

5	v

6	v

7	v

8	v

9	v

10	v

11	v

12	v

13	v

14	v

15	v

16	v

17	v

18	v

19	v

20	v

21	v

22	v

23	v

24	v

25	v

26	v

27	v

28	v

29	v

30	v

31	v

32	v

33	v

34	v
