= Marcel Kappelmaier =

German footballer

Personal information
- Date of birth: 14 April 1991 (age 35)
- Place of birth: Ingolstadt, Germany
- Position: Left-back

Youth career
- TSV Baar-Ebenhausen
- FC Ingolstadt 04
- –2010: 1860 Munich

Senior career*
Years	Team	Apps	(Gls)
2010–2012	1860 Munich II	34	(1)
2012–2013	SpVgg Unterhaching	6	(0)
- * Club domestic league appearances and goals as of 3 January 2013

Marcel Kappelmaier (born 14 April 1991) is a German footballer who plays as a defender. He played in the 3. Liga for SpVgg Unterhaching.

== Career ==
Kappelmaier began his career with 1860 Munich, and was promoted to the reserve team in 2010. He played 34 times in the Regionalliga Süd over the next two years, scoring once, and was given a squad number for the first-team for the 2011–12 season, but didn't make any appearances. In July 2012 he signed for SpVgg Unterhaching of the 3. Liga, alongside teammates Daniel Hofstetter and Marius Willsch. After six appearances in the first half of the 2012–13 season, he was released on a free transfer.
