= Tim Rieder =

German footballer (born 1993)

Personal information
- Date of birth: 3 September 1993 (age 33)
- Place of birth: Dachau, Germany
- Height: 1.86 m (6 ft 1 in)
- Positions: Defensive midfielder; centre-back

Team information
- Current team: VSG Altglienicke
- Number: 23

Youth career
- 1999–2000: ASV Dachau
- 2000–2010: Bayern Munich
- 2010–2012: FC Augsburg

Senior career*
Years	Team	Apps	(Gls)
2012–2014	FC Augsburg II	132	(4)
2014–2020	FC Augsburg	5	(0)
2018	→ Śląsk Wrocław (loan)	13	(0)
2018–2019	→ Darmstadt 98 (loan)	15	(0)
2019–2020	→ 1860 Munich (loan)	25	(3)
2020–2021	1. FC Kaiserslautern	36	(0)
2021–2022	Türkgücü München	28	(0)
2022–2024	1860 Munich	53	(2)
2024–2025	PAS Giannina	26	(1)
2025–	VSG Altglienicke	43	(0)
- * Club domestic league appearances and goals as of 23 September 2026

Tim Rieder (German pronunciation: [ˈʁiːdɐ]; born 3 September 1993) is a German professional footballer who plays as a defensive midfielder for Regionalliga Nordost club VSG Altglienicke.

== Career ==
Rieder began playing football with ASV Dachau in his home town before joining the Bayern Munich academy in 2000, where he spent ten seasons. In 2010 he moved to the youth set-up of FC Augsburg, and in 2012 he was promoted to the club's second team in the Regionalliga Bayern. He was part of the first-team squad from 2014 and made his Bundesliga debut in 2016, going on to make five appearances in the competition.

In January 2018, Augsburg loaned Rieder to Śląsk Wrocław of the Polish Ekstraklasa for the rest of the season. On 7 August 2018, he was loaned out again, joining 2. Bundesliga club Darmstadt 98 for the 2018–19 season. He made his debut three days later, coming on for Slobodan Medojević in the 90th minute of a 2–0 defeat away to FC St. Pauli, and returned to Augsburg after 15 league appearances.

After a single cup appearance at the start of the following season, Rieder was loaned to 3. Liga club 1860 Munich on 2 September 2019 for the remainder of the 2019–20 season.

In August 2020, Rieder joined 1. FC Kaiserslautern on a three-year contract.

On 8 July 2021, Rieder signed with 3. Liga club Türkgücü München. He made his competitive debut for the club on 25 August in the season opener against SC Verl which ended in a 0–0 draw. He made a total of 31 appearances for the club in which he failed to score.

Rieder returned to his former club 1860 Munich on 16 May 2022, after Türkgücü München had filed for insolvency. On 23 July, he made his return debut for the club on the opening day of the 2022–23 season, also scoring his first goal for the club in a 4–3 away victory against Dynamo Dresden. He then played the entire match in a 3–0 loss to Borussia Dortmund in the first round of the DFB-Pokal. Rieder was a regular in defensive midfield during the 2022–23 season until a torn medial collateral ligament ruled him out from the 25th matchday for the rest of the campaign. He won his place back the following season, but was not offered a new contract and left 1860 Munich in the summer of 2024.

In late July 2024, Rieder signed for PAS Giannina, who had just been relegated to the Greek second tier, the Super League 2. He spent one season in Greece, during which he was deployed in several positions, including centre-back.

In June 2025, Rieder returned to Germany and joined Regionalliga Nordost club VSG Altglienicke. He made 33 league appearances in his first season, in which Altglienicke won the Berlin Cup for the second time in the club's history, beating BFC Dynamo 2–1 after extra time in the final on 23 May 2026 to qualify for the 2026–27 DFB-Pokal.

Rieder started in the first round of that competition on 24 August 2026, when the fourth-tier side led three times against 2. Bundesliga club VfL Wolfsburg before losing 6–5 on penalties following a 3–3 draw after extra time; he was booked and substituted in the 101st minute. He extended his contract for the 2026–27 season.

== Career statistics ==
As of match played 19 September 2026

Appearances and goals by club, season and competition
Club	Season	League			Cup (Note: Includes DFB-Pokal, Greek Cup)		Other		Total	
Club	Season	Division	Apps	Goals	Apps	Goals	Apps	Goals	Apps	Goals
FC Augsburg II	2012–13	Regionalliga Bayern	28	0	—		1 (Note: Appearance in Regionalliga Bayern relegation play-offs)	0	29	0
FC Augsburg II	2013–14	Regionalliga Bayern	30	0	—		—		30	0
FC Augsburg II	2014–15	Regionalliga Bayern	28	2	—		—		28	2
FC Augsburg II	2015–16	Regionalliga Bayern	27	1	—		2	0	29	1
FC Augsburg II	2016–17	Regionalliga Bayern	10	0	—		—		10	0
FC Augsburg II	2017–18	Regionalliga Bayern	9	1	—		—		9	1
FC Augsburg II	Total		132	4	—		3	0	135	4
FC Augsburg	2016–17	Bundesliga	5	0	0	0	—		5	0
Śląsk Wrocław (loan)	2017–18	Ekstraklasa	13	0	0	0	0	0	13	0
Darmstadt 98 (loan)	2018–19	2. Bundesliga	15	0	2	0	0	0	17	0
1860 Munich (loan)	2019–20	3. Liga	25	3	0	0	1 (Note: Appearances in Bavarian Cup)	0	26	3
1. FC Kaiserslautern	2020–21	3. Liga	36	0	1	0	1 (Note: Appearances in Southwestern Cup)	0	38	0
Türkgücü München	2021–22	3. Liga	28	0	2	0	2	0	31	0
1860 Munich	2022–23	3. Liga	22	2	1	0	2	0	25	2
1860 Munich	2023–24	3. Liga	31	0	0	0	0	0	31	0
1860 Munich	Total		53	2	1	0	2	0	56	2
PAS Giannina	2024–25	Super League Greece 2	26	1	3	0	—		29	1
VSG Altglienicke	2025–26	Regionalliga Nordost	33	0	0	0	6 (Note: Appearances in Berlin Cup)	1	39	1
VSG Altglienicke	2026–27	Regionalliga Nordost	10	0	1	0	1	0	12	0
VSG Altglienicke	Total		43	0	1	0	7	1	51	1
Career total			376	10	10	0	16	1	402	11
