= Martin Kobylański =

Polish footballer

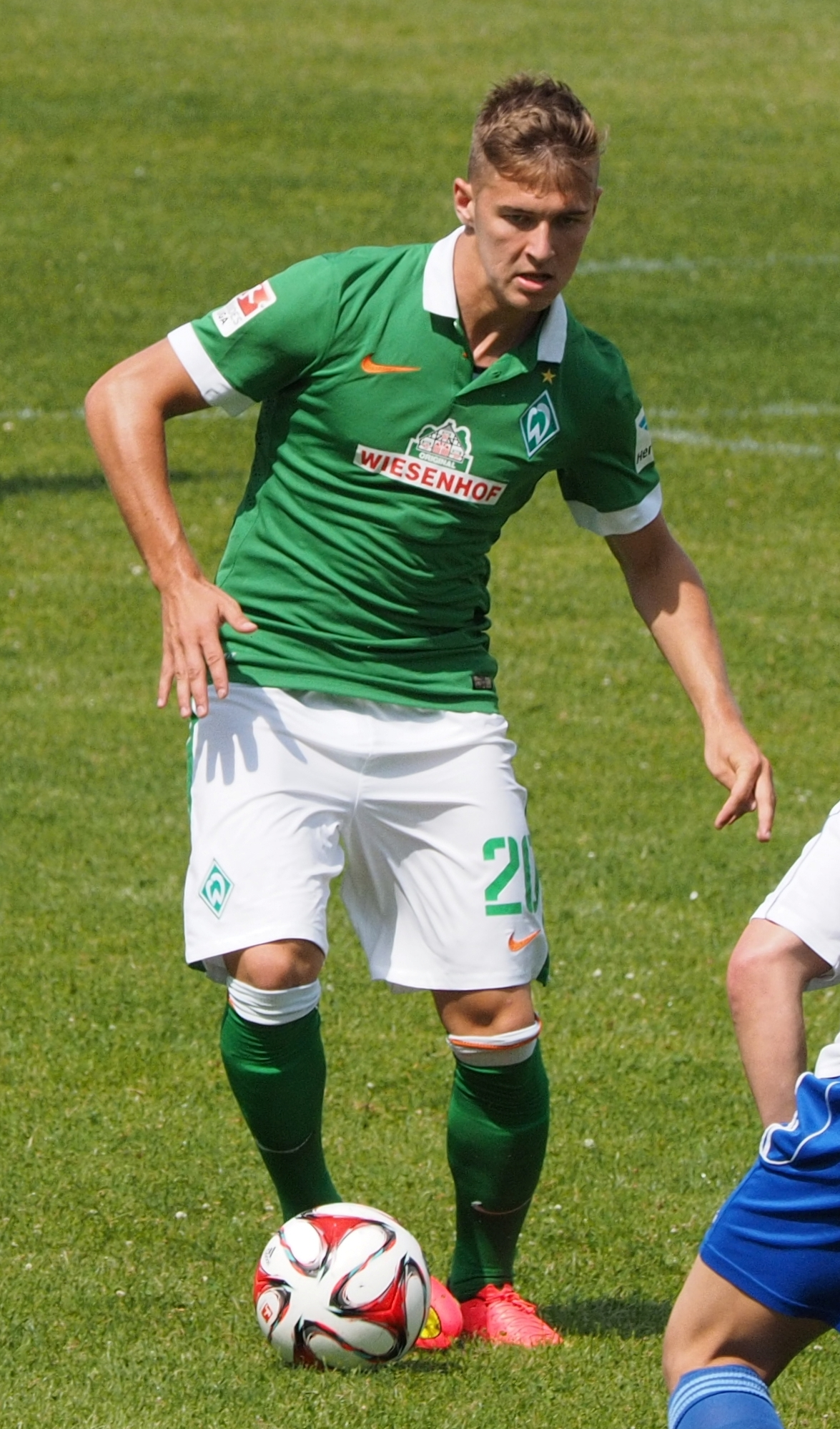
- Kobylański with Werder Bremen in 2014

Personal information
- Date of birth: 8 March 1994 (age 32)
- Place of birth: Berlin, Germany
- Height: 1.79 m (5 ft 10 in)
- Position: Attacking midfielder

Youth career
- 1998–2000: Hannover 96
- 2000–2011: Energie Cottbus

Senior career*
Years	Team	Apps	(Gls)
2011–2012	Energie Cottbus II	13	(2)
2011–2012	Energie Cottbus	3	(0)
2012–2016	Werder Bremen II	55	(22)
2013–2015	Werder Bremen	8	(0)
2014–2015	→ Union Berlin (loan)	19	(3)
2016	Lechia Gdańsk II	3	(2)
2016–2017	Lechia Gdańsk	3	(0)
2017	→ Preußen Münster (loan)	16	(5)
2017–2019	Preußen Münster	73	(22)
2019–2022	Eintracht Braunschweig	86	(24)
2022–2023	1860 Munich	23	(3)
2023–2024	VSG Altglienicke	7	(1)
2024–2025	Waldhof Mannheim	33	(3)
2025–2026	Blau-Weiß Lohne	18	(4)

International career
2009	Poland U15	5	(1)
2009–2010	Poland U16	9	(0)
2010	Germany U16	2	(1)
2010–2011	Poland U17	7	(2)
2011	Germany U18	3	(1)
2012	Poland U18	3	(1)
2012–2013	Poland U19	13	(7)
2013–2014	Poland U20	6	(1)
2014–2015	Poland U21	6	(0)
- * Club domestic league appearances and goals as of 6 March 2026

Martin Kobylański (Polish pronunciation: [ˈmartiŋ kɔbɨˈlaj̃skʲi], German: [ˈmaʁtiːn kobiˈlanskiː]; born 8 March 1994) is a professional footballer who plays as an attacking midfielder. Born in Germany, he has represented both his country of birth and Poland at youth level.

== Early years ==
Kobylański was born in Berlin as the son of former Polish international Andrzej Kobylański and grandson of footballer Alfred Kobylański. At the time of his birth, his father was playing for 2. Bundesliga side Tennis Borussia Berlin. The majority of his youth however, he spent in nearby Cottbus where his father also had a three-year spell with local FC Energie.

== Career ==
=== Professional debut in Cottbus ===
At the age of only 17, he made his 2. Bundesliga debut on 6 November 2011 as a 15th-minute substitute for Dimitar Rangelov in a 2–0 home loss to SC Paderborn. At that time several Bundesliga clubs, including Bayern Munich, showed interest in his services.

=== Werder Bremen ===
Kobylański signed for Werder Bremen II in summer 2012, and was a regular for the team throughout the following 2012–13 season. He made his debut for the first team in a friendly versus FC St. Pauli on 5 September 2013 and scored Werder's only goal in a shock 4–1 defeat. He had his debut in the Bundesliga for Werder Bremen on 21 September 2013 in a game against Hamburger SV in which he started.

==== Union Berlin (loan) ====
In August 2014, Kobylański moved to his native city and signed for Union Berlin on a one-year loan. Werder Bremen also granted Union a purchase clause.

=== Preußen Münster ===
Kobylanski spent the second half of the 2016–17 season at 3. Liga club Preußen Münster, on loan from Lechia Gdańsk, scoring five goals in 16 appearances while being deployed in different positions. He signed permanently for the club in June 2017, agreeing to a two-year contract.

=== Eintracht Braunschweig ===
On 30 May 2019, Eintracht Braunschweig confirmed, that they had signed Kobylanski for the 2019–20 season on a three-year contract. On 14 May 2022, it was announced he would leave the team at the end of the season.

=== 1860 Munich ===
On 19 May 2022, Kobylański signed for 3. Liga side 1860 Munich. On 22 June 2023, he left the club by mutual consent.

=== VSG Altglienicke ===
On 13 August 2023, Kobylański joined Regionalliga Nordost club VSG Altglienicke.

=== Waldhof Mannheim ===
On 1 February 2024, he moved to 3. Liga club Waldhof Mannheim.

=== Blau-Weiß Lohne ===
On 19 June 2025, Kobylański signed a two-year deal with Regionalliga Nord club Blau-Weiß Lohne.
