= Bernd Helmschrot =

German footballer

Personal information
- Date of birth: 18 March 1947 (age 79)
- Place of birth: Hanover, Germany
- Height: 1.80 m (5 ft 11 in)
- Position: Goalkeeper

Youth career
- 1957–1965: Hannover 96

Senior career*
Years	Team	Apps	(Gls)
1965–1968	Hannover 96 II	?	(?)
1967–1971	Hannover 96	48	(0)
1971–1973	TSV 1860 München	68	(0)
1973–1974	Kickers Offenbach	25	(0)
1974–1975	Olympia Wilhelmshaven	38	(0)
1975–1979	Kickers Offenbach	146	(0)
1979–1982	Viktoria Köln	?	(?)
1982–1984	Fortuna Köln	60	(0)
1984–1987	Olympia Wilhelmshaven	57	(0)

International career^{‡}
1968	West Germany amateur	2	(0)
- * Club domestic league appearances and goals as of 13:15, 5 October 2013 (UTC) ‡ National team caps and goals as of 13:15, 5 October 2013 (UTC)

Bernd Helmschrot (born 18 March 1947) is a former German footballer. He played as a goalkeeper.

Helmschrot began his career with Hannover 96 and made his professional debut for the club in a 2-2 draw with Hamburger SV in the Bundesliga on 17 February 1968. He remained as Hannover's first-choice goalkeeper for the next nine months, but after losing his position due to injury, he struggled to re-establish himself in the starting line-up. In 1968, he toured east Asia with the West Germany amateur international squad, making two appearances. He left Hannover in 1971 for TSV 1860 München, where he was managed by former West Germany international goalkeeper Hans Tilkowski.

Helmschrot went on to play for Kickers Offenbach, Olympia Wilhelmshaven, Viktoria Köln and Fortuna Köln, for whom he played in the 1983 final of the DFB cup, which his team lost 1-0 to local rivals 1. FC Köln. After retiring in 1987 he worked as an advertising manager.
