= Nathan Wicht =

Swiss footballer (born 2004)

Personal information
- Full name: Nathan Gilbert Eric Wicht
- Date of birth: 20 February 2004 (age 22)
- Place of birth: Zürich, Switzerland
- Height: 1.85 m (6 ft 1 in)
- Position: Midfielder

Team information
- Current team: Hertha Zehlendorf
- Number: 8

Youth career
- 2015–2016: SpVgg Unterhaching
- 2016–: 1860 Munich

Senior career*
Years	Team	Apps	(Gls)
2021–2023	1860 Munich II	12	(1)
2021–2023	1860 Munich	3	(0)
2023–2025	Luzern U21	44	(0)
2025–	Hertha Zehlendorf	29	(1)

International career^{‡}
2019	Switzerland U15	4	(2)
2019	Switzerland U16	4	(0)
2021–2022	Switzerland U18	5	(0)
2022	Switzerland U19	3	(0)
- * Club domestic league appearances and goals as of 22 June 2026 ‡ National team caps and goals as of 20 October 2022

Nathan Gilbert Eric Wicht (born 20 February 2004) is a Swiss professional footballer who plays as a midfielder for Hertha Zehlendorf.

== Club career ==
Born in Zürich, Wicht played for SpVgg Unterhaching before joining 1860 Munich's academy in 2016. In summer 2021, he signed his first professional contract with the club. He made his senior debut on 24 August 2021 as a late substitute in a 3–0 win over Viktoria Köln.

== International career ==
Wicht has represented Switzerland at under-15, under-16 and under-18.
