= Marco Hiller =

German footballer (born 1997)

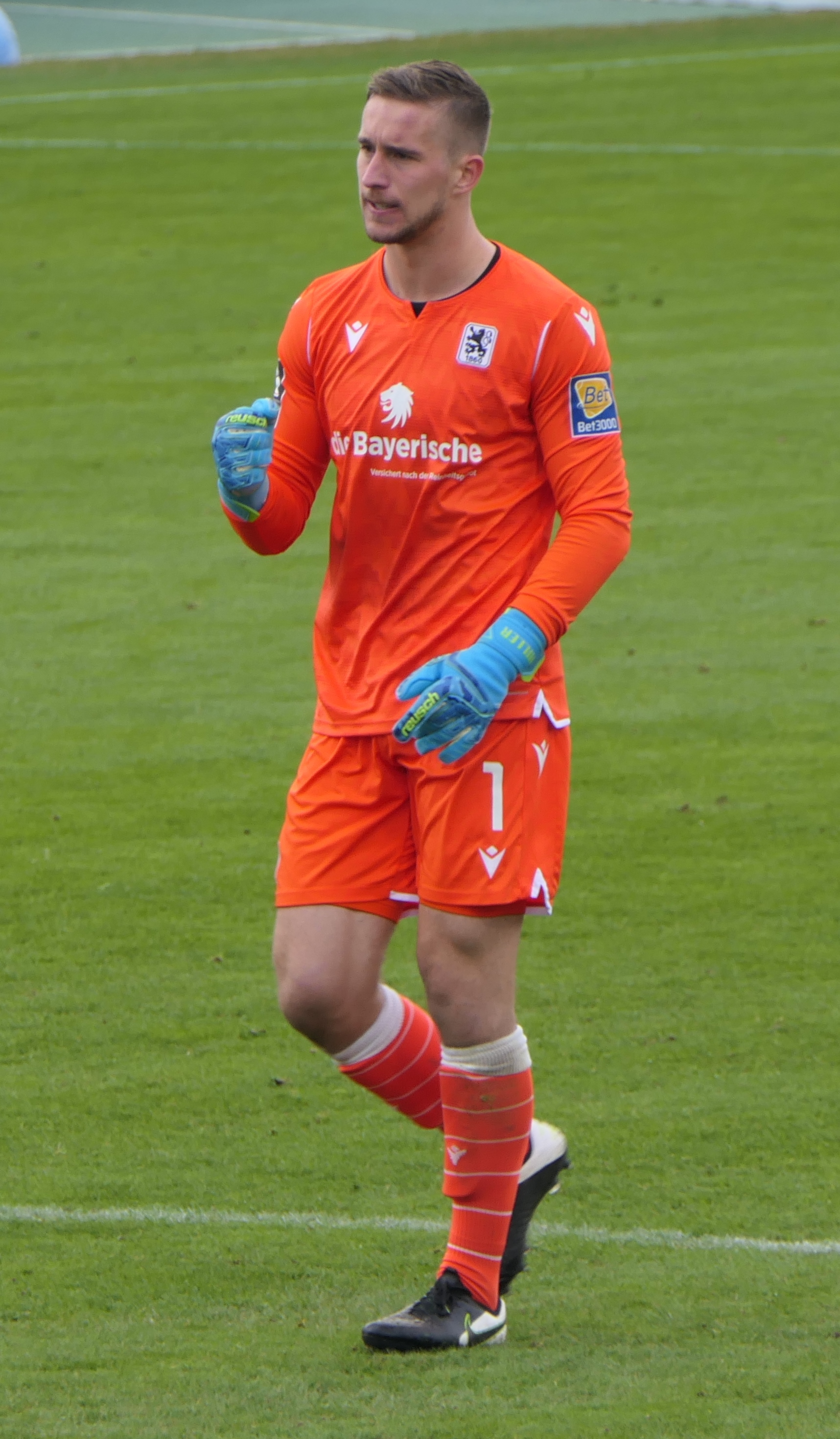
- Hiller with 1860 Munich in 2020

Personal information
- Date of birth: 20 February 1997 (age 29)
- Place of birth: Gröbenzell, Germany
- Height: 1.88 m (6 ft 2 in)
- Position: Goalkeeper

Team information
- Current team: Eupen
- Number: 1

Youth career
- 2003–2008: FC Grün-Weiß Gröbenzell
- 2008–2016: 1860 Munich

Senior career*
Years	Team	Apps	(Gls)
2016–2017	1860 Munich II	11	(0)
2017–2025	1860 Munich	261	(0)
2025–	Eupen	30	(0)
- * Club domestic league appearances and goals as of 20 April 2026

Marco Hiller (born 20 February 1997) is a German professional footballer who plays as a goalkeeper for Belgian Challenger Pro League club Eupen.

== Club career ==
Hiller began his youth career in 2003 at FC Grün-Weiß Gröbenzell, before moving to 1860 Munich's youth academy in 2008. He made his debut for the reserve side on 23 April 2018 against FV Illertissen in the Regionalliga Bayern, with the match a finishing as a 1–3 away loss. For the 2017–18 season, Hiller joined 1860's first team, which had been relegated to the Regionalliga. He made his debut on 13 July 2017 in a 4–1 home win against FC Memmingen. 1860 Munich finished as champions of the Regionalliga Bayern, and subsequently won the promotion play-offs to the 3. Liga against 1. FC Saarbrücken.

In the following season, Hiller made his professional debut in the first round of the 2018–19 DFB-Pokal against 2. Bundesliga side Holstein Kiel, which finished as a 1–3 home loss.

On 11 July 2025, Hiller moved to Belgium and signed a two-season contract with Eupen.

== Career statistics ==
As of match played 16 September 2023

Appearances and goals by club, season and competition
Club	Season	League			National Cup		Other		Total	
Club	Season	Division	Apps	Goals	Apps	Goals	Apps	Goals	Apps	Goals
1860 Munich II	2015–16	Regionalliga Bayern	2	0	—		—		2	0
1860 Munich II	2016–17	Regionalliga Bayern	9	0	—		—		9	0
1860 Munich II	Total		11	0	—		—		11	0
1860 Munich	2017–18	Regionalliga Bayern	33	0	—		2 (Note: Appearances in the Regionalliga playoff)	0	35	0
1860 Munich	2018–19	3. Liga	33	0	1	0	—		34	0
1860 Munich	2019–20	3. Liga	25	0	—		2 (Note: Appearances in the Bavarian Cup)	0	27	0
1860 Munich	2020–21	3. Liga	38	0	1	0	—		39	0
1860 Munich	2021–22	3. Liga	35	0	3	0	—		38	0
1860 Munich	2022–23	3. Liga	34	0	1	0	—		35	0
1860 Munich	2023–24	3. Liga	6	0	—		0	0	6	0
1860 Munich	Total		204	0	6	0	4	0	214	0
Career Total			215	0	6	0	4	0	225	0

== Honours ==
1860 Munich

- Regionalliga Bayern: 2017–18
