= Quirin Moll =

German professional footballer (born 1991)

Personal information
- Date of birth: 21 January 1991 (age 35)
- Place of birth: Dachau, Germany
- Height: 1.82 m (6 ft 0 in)
- Position: Defensive midfielder

Youth career
- TSV 1865 Dachau
- –2008: Bayern Munich
- 2008–2010: Greuther Fürth

Senior career*
| Years | Team | Apps | (Gls) |
| 2010–2012 | SV Heimstetten | 59 | (2) |
| 2012–2014 | SpVgg Unterhaching | 56 | (3) |
| 2014–2016 | Dynamo Dresden | 57 | (0) |
| 2016–2018 | Eintracht Braunschweig | 48 | (0) |
| 2018–2023 | 1860 Munich | 103 | (3) |
- * Club domestic league appearances and goals as of 27 May 2023

Quirin Moll (born 21 January 1991) is a German professional footballer who plays as a defensive midfielder.

== Career ==
Moll played youth football for Bayern Munich and SpVgg Greuther Fürth before joining SV Heimstetten of the Bayernliga in 2010. Two years later he signed for SpVgg Unterhaching and made his 3. Liga debut as a substitute for Yasin Yılmaz in a 4–1 win over 1. FC Heidenheim. He signed for Dynamo Dresden in July 2014.

In April 2016, it was announced that Moll would join Eintracht Braunschweig on a free transfer for the 2015–16 season.

Moll joined 1860 Munich on 20 June 2018. He signed a contract extension with the club in June 2021. Moll left 1860 Munich after his contract finished after the 2022–23 season.

== Honours ==
Dynamo Dresden

- 3. Liga: 2015–16
