= Jonas Nietfeld =

German footballer

Personal information
- Date of birth: 15 January 1994 (age 32)
- Place of birth: Minden, Germany
- Height: 1.86 m (6 ft 1 in)
- Position: Forward

Team information
- Current team: VSG Altglienicke
- Number: 10

Youth career
- –2011: Hannover 96
- 2011–2012: Rot-Weiß Erfurt

Senior career*
Years	Team	Apps	(Gls)
2012–2014	Rot-Weiß Erfurt	33	(5)
2014–2015	Schalke 04 II	26	(3)
2015–2017	FSV Zwickau	67	(21)
2017–2019	Jahn Regensburg	47	(5)
2019–2025	Hallescher FC	185	(20)
2025–	VSG Altglienicke	44	(22)
- * Club domestic league appearances and goals as of 23 September 2026

Jonas Nietfeld (born 15 January 1994) is a German professional footballer who plays as a forward for VSG Altglienicke.

== Career ==
Nietfeld played as a youth for Hannover 96 before joining Rot-Weiss Erfurt in 2011. He made his debut for the club in August 2010, as a substitute for Tom Bertram in a 3–0 defeat to Hallescher FC.

In August 2014, some weeks after the start of the season, Nietfeld left Erfurt and signed for Schalke 04's reserve team on a one-year deal. Although Erfurt secured themselves a clause to retract him if required.

In the 2017 summer transfer window, Nietfeld joined SSV Jahn Regensburg which were newly promoted to the 2. Bundesliga. After two years in Regensburg, he joined Hallescher FC.

== Career statistics ==
=== Club ===
As of 29 June 2026

Appearances and goals by club, season and competition
Club	Season	League			National Cup		Total	
Club	Season	Division	Apps	Goals	Apps	Goals	Apps	Goals
Rot-Weiß Erfurt	2011-12	3. Liga	0	0	—		0	0
Rot-Weiß Erfurt	2012-13	3. Liga	6	0	—		6	0
Rot-Weiß Erfurt	2013-14	3. Liga	26	5	—		26	5
Rot-Weiß Erfurt	2014-15	3. Liga	1	0	—		1	0
Rot-Weiß Erfurt	Total		33	5	—		33	5
Schalke 04 II	2014-15	Regionalliga	26	3	—		26	3
Zwickau	2015-16	Regionalliga	36	15	—		36	15
Zwickau	2016-17	3. Liga	33	6	1	0	34	6
Zwickau	Total		69	21	1	0	70	21
Jahn Regensburg	2017-18	2. Bundesliga	30	5	2	2	32	7
Jahn Regensburg	2018-19	2. Bundesliga	18	0	1	0	19	0
Jahn Regensburg	Total		48	5	3	2	51	7
Hallescher FC	2019-20	3. Liga	36	6	1	0	37	6
Hallescher FC	2020-21	3. Liga	36	0	—		36	0
Hallescher FC	2021-22	3. Liga	32	1	—		32	1
Hallescher FC	2022-23	3. Liga	31	6	—		31	6
Hallescher FC	2023-24	3. Liga	37	4	1	0	38	4
Hallescher FC	2024-25	Regionalliga	13	3	—		13	3
Hallescher FC	Total		185	20	2	0	187	20
VSG Altglienicke	2025-26	Regionalliga	34	19	—		34	19
Career Total			382	70	6	2	388	72
