= Michael Kokocinski =

German footballer

Personal information
- Date of birth: 7 February 1985 (age 41)
- Place of birth: Germany
- Height: 1.85 m (6 ft 1 in)
- Positions: Defender; midfielder

Youth career
- –1997: 1860 Rosenheim
- 1997–2004: 1860 Munich

Senior career*
Years	Team	Apps	(Gls)
2004–2006	1860 Munich II	47	(4)
2006–2008	Bayern Munich II	56	(4)
2008–2009	Kickers Offenbach	18	(1)
2009–2010	Wacker Burghausen	32	(1)
2010–2014	1860 Rosenheim	117	(18)
2014–2017	1860 Munich II	54	(0)
2017–2018	Türkgücü München	19	(0)
2019	SV Vogtareuth	2	(0)
Total		345	(28)

International career
	Germany U-20	1	(0)

Managerial career
- 2016: 1860 München II
- 2019: SV Vogtareuth (playing assistant)
- 2019–: TSV Wasserburg
- * Club domestic league appearances and goals

Michael Kokocinski (born 7 February 1985) is a German retired footballer.

== Career ==
He has previously played for both 1860 Munich II, Bayern Munich II as well as Wacker Burghausen, Kickers Offenbach and 1860 Rosenheim.
