= Jesper Verlaat =

Dutch footballer (born 1996)

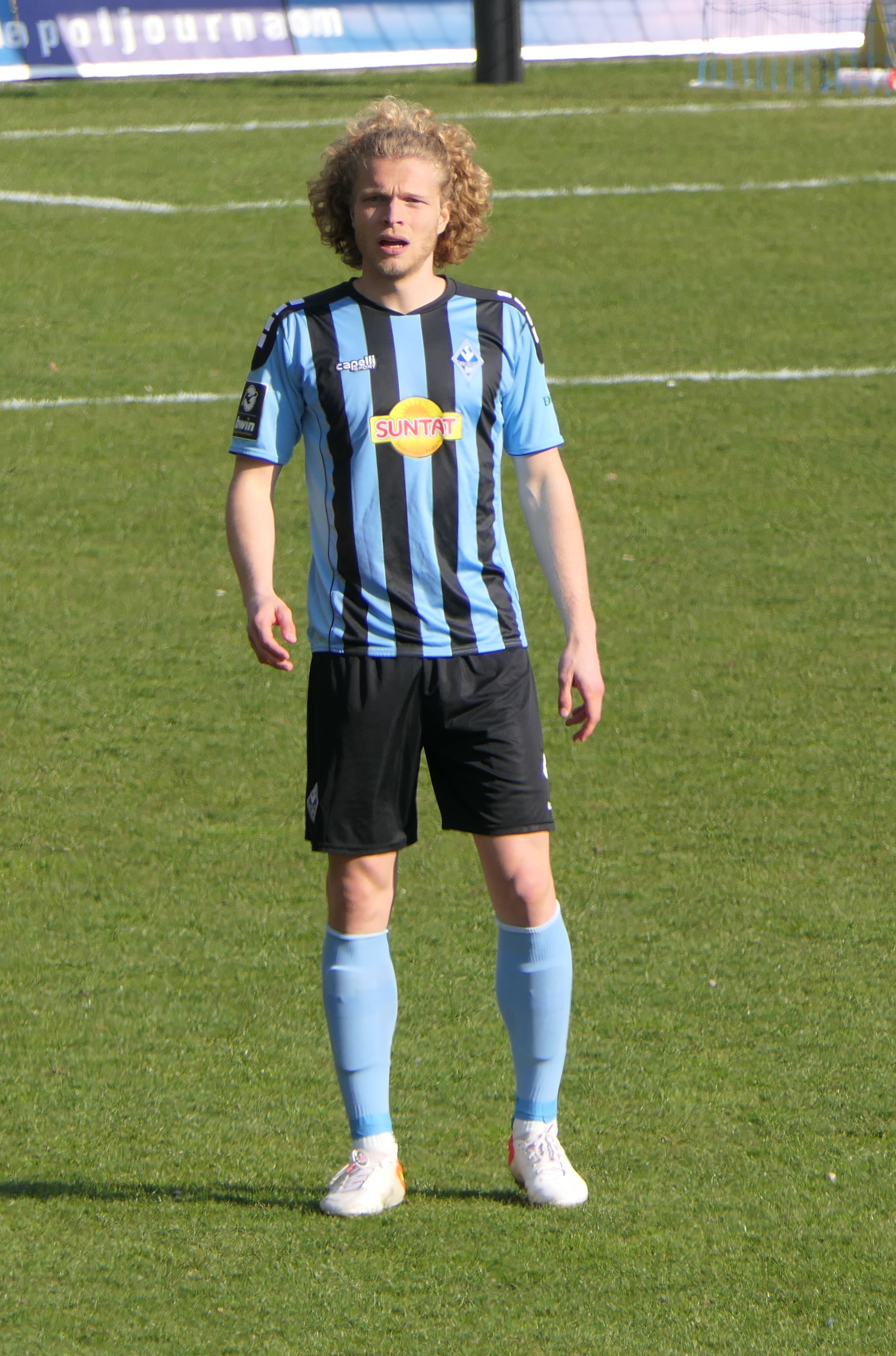
- Verlaat playing for Waldhof Mannheim in 2022

Personal information
- Date of birth: 4 June 1996 (age 30)
- Place of birth: Zaanstad, Netherlands
- Height: 1.92 m (6 ft 4 in)
- Position: Centre-back

Team information
- Current team: Borussia Dortmund II
- Number: 4

Youth career
- 2001–2003: FC Oberneuland
- 2003–2005: Admira Wacker
- 2005–2007: Sturm Graz
- 2007–2010: Ferreiras
- 2010–2012: CD Odiáxere
- 2012–2015: Werder Bremen

Senior career*
Years	Team	Apps	(Gls)
2015–2018	Werder Bremen II	79	(3)
2018–2020	SV Sandhausen	32	(0)
2020–2022	Waldhof Mannheim	53	(3)
2022–2026	1860 Munich	108	(7)
2026–	Borussia Dortmund II	7	(1)
- * Club domestic league appearances and goals as of 23 September 2026

Jesper Verlaat (born 4 June 1996) is a Dutch professional footballer who plays as a centre-back for Borussia Dortmund II. Having come through the youth ranks of Werder Bremen, he began his professional career with the club's reserves. He is the son of former Dutch footballer Frank Verlaat, who also played for Bremen.

== Career ==
Verlaat, who can be mobilised both in midfield and in central defence, began his career at FC Oberneuland before moving to the youth academy of Admira Wacker in 2003. Subsequently, Verlaat played at Sturm Graz. When his parents relocated to Algarve, Portugal in 2007, Verlaat played for various Portuguese teams until Verlaat moved to Werder Bremen in summer 2012 after a trial with the U-17s.

On 13 March 2015, Verlaat made his debut for Werder Bremen's reserves, coming on as a substitute for Onur Capin just before the end against TSV Havelse. In the summer he permanently became part of the second team, which had been promoted to the 3. Liga. He made his 3. Liga debut on 1 November 2015 as a substitute in the 29th minute in the 3–2 home win against Chemnitzer FC. Since then Verlaat became a regular player. His first goal for the second team came on 7 November 2015, during the 2–1 away defeat against Fortuna Köln. In May 2018, following Werder Bremen II's relegation from the 3. Liga, it was announced Verlaat would be one of ten players to leave the club.

In June 2018, Verlaat joined 2. Bundesliga side SV Sandhausen on a two-year contract.

Verlaat joined 3. Liga side Waldhof Mannheim in July 2020.

On 31 May 2022, Verlaat signed with 1860 Munich.
