= Suheyel Najar =

German footballer

Personal information
- Date of birth: 13 October 1995 (age 31)
- Place of birth: Cologne, Germany
- Height: 1.84 m (6 ft 0 in)
- Position: Midfielder

Team information
- Current team: Fortuna Köln
- Number: 21

Youth career
- –2014: SSV Vingst 05

Senior career*
Years	Team	Apps	(Gls)
2014	SSV Vingst 05	10	(6)
2014–2015	FC Bergheim	23	(0)
2015–2017	Blau-Weiß Friesdorf	55	(15)
2017	SV Bergisch Gladbach	15	(3)
2018	FC Hennef 05	16	(2)
2018	TV Herkenrath	14	(3)
2019	Bonner SC	13	(2)
2019–2020	Viktoria Köln	5	(0)
2020–2022	Fortuna Köln	64	(12)
2022–2023	SV Wehen Wiesbaden	13	(1)
2023–2025	Viktoria Köln	19	(1)
2025–	Fortuna Köln	2	(1)
- * Club domestic league appearances and goals as of 18:19, 4 June 2026 (UTC)

Suheyel Najar (born 13 October 1995) is a German professional footballer who plays as a midfielder for 3. Liga club Fortuna Köln.

== Career ==
Najar made his professional debut for Viktoria Köln in the 3. Liga on 20 July 2019, coming on as a substitute in the 85th minute for Albert Bunjaku in the 3–3 away draw against Hansa Rostock.

== Honours ==
Fortuna Köln

- Regionalliga West: 2025–26
