= Erik Tallig =

German footballer

Personal information
- Date of birth: 10 January 2000 (age 26)
- Place of birth: Chemnitz, Germany
- Height: 1.78 m (5 ft 10 in)
- Position: Midfielder

Team information
- Current team: VSG Altglienicke
- Number: 30

Youth career
- –2009: SSV Textima Chemnitz
- 2009–2018: Chemnitzer FC

Senior career*
Years	Team	Apps	(Gls)
2018–2020	Chemnitzer FC	43	(8)
2020–2023	1860 Munich	89	(6)
2023–2024	SSV Jahn Regensburg	0	(0)
2025	Energie Cottbus	9	(0)
2026–	VSG Altglienicke	11	(3)
- * Club domestic league appearances and goals as of 22 June 2026

Erik Tallig (born 10 January 2000) is a German professional footballer who plays as a midfielder for Regionalliga Nordost club VSG Altglienicke.

== Club career ==
On 14 January 2025, Tallig signed with Energie Cottbus.
