= Albion Vrenezi =

Kosovan footballer (born 1993)

Personal information
- Date of birth: 4 October 1993 (age 33)
- Place of birth: Marali, Malisheva, Yugoslavia
- Height: 1.77 m (5 ft 10 in)
- Position: Left winger

Youth career
- SV Planegg-Krailling

Senior career*
Years	Team	Apps	(Gls)
2013–2015	FC Unterföhring	64	(20)
2015–2017	FC Augsburg II	63	(13)
2017–2021	Jahn Regensburg	51	(4)
2019–2020	→ Würzburger Kickers (loan)	32	(5)
2021–2022	Türkgücü München	30	(6)
2022–2024	1860 Munich	61	(6)
2024–2025	Viktoria Köln	23	(2)
- * Club domestic league appearances and goals as of 24 May 2025

Albion Vrenezi (born 4 October 1993) is a Kosovan professional footballer who plays as a left winger.

== Career ==
In summer 2017, Vrenezi transferred from FC Augsburg II to SSV Jahn Regensburg. He made his professional debut on 20 August 2017 in a 4–2 win of Jahn Regensburg against FC Ingolstadt 04.

On 20 June 2024, Vrenezi signed with Viktoria Köln.
