= Stefan Lex =

German footballer

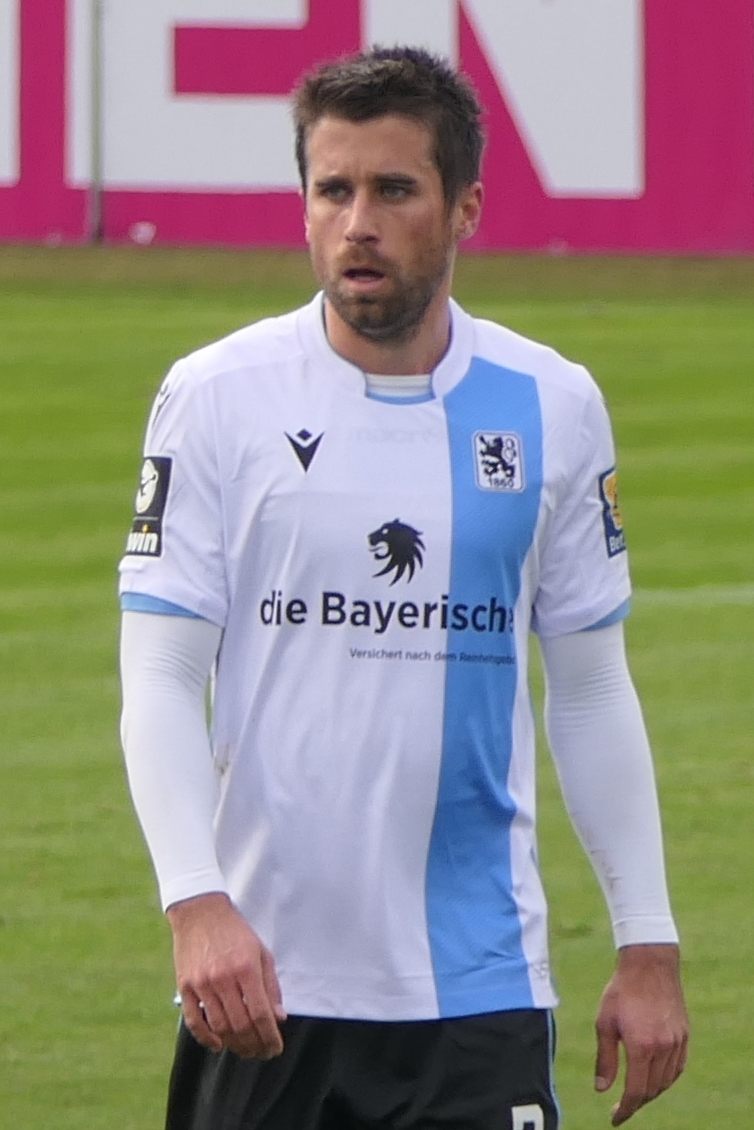
- Lex with 1860 Munich in 2020

Personal information
- Date of birth: 27 November 1989 (age 36)
- Place of birth: Erding, Germany
- Height: 1.78 m (5 ft 10 in)
- Position: Winger

Youth career
- FC Eitting
- –2009: SE Freising

Senior career*
Years	Team	Apps	(Gls)
2009–2013	TSV Buchbach	97	(33)
2013–2014	Greuther Fürth II	31	(13)
2013–2014	Greuther Fürth	0	(0)
2014–2018	FC Ingolstadt 04	77	(11)
2018–2023	1860 Munich	163	(30)
- * Club domestic league appearances and goals

Stefan Lex (born 27 November 1989) is a German former professional footballer who played as a winger.

== Career ==
Lex retired at the end of the 2022–23 season.
