= VSG Altglienicke =

German association football club from Altglienicke, Berlin

- Full name: Volkssport Gemeinschaft Altglienicke Berlin e.V.
- Founded: 1883
- Ground: Spree-Arena
- Capacity: 8,000
- Manager: Dan Twardzik
- League: Regionalliga Nordost (IV)
- 2025–26: Regionalliga Nordost, 6th of 18
Home colours	Away colours

VSG Altglienicke (Volkssport Gemeinschaft Altglienicke) is a German football club based in the locality of Altglienicke, in the borough of Treptow-Köpenick, Berlin. The football department is part of a larger multi-sport club offering activities such as volleyball, handball, gymnastics, bowling, and senior sports. The team competes in the Regionalliga Nordost, the fourth tier of the German football league system.

Founded as a local sports organisation, VSG Altglienicke spent much of its early history in the lower levels of East German football. Since German reunification, the club gradually climbed the regional league system, earning promotion to the Regionalliga in 2017. In subsequent seasons, Altglienicke has established itself as a consistent contender at that level, achieving several top-table finishes and participating in promotion play-offs, though without securing elevation to the professional 3. Liga.

The club plays its home matches at the Friedrich-Ludwig-Jahn-Sportpark or alternate Berlin venues compliant with league licensing requirements, as its traditional ground, the Altglienicker Grundschuleplatz, does not meet the standards for higher-tier football. The team's colours are blue and white.

== History ==
VSG acknowledges the role of several local Altglienicke sides in the club's history. The first of these is MTV Spiess founded in 1883 out of a gymnastics club formed in mid-century. As was common at the time the club had a nationalistic, martial character. This sports association soon adopted handball, a legacy passed on to the modern day club.

Two other local clubs, Altenglienicker Arbeiter- und Turnsportverein (also known as Bewegungsclub Freiheit) and Altglienicker Ballspielclub were formed in 1906. Each of these clubs had football departments with AATSV also having an athletics section. All three associations were active through to 1933 when the membership of AATSV appears to have been dispersed to the other clubs.

The traditional crest of VSG Altglienicke

After World War II occupying Allied authorities banned all existing organizations in Germany, including sports and football associations. Sports clubs were soon reformed and in 1948 Altglienicker Sportverein emerged bringing together the memberships of the old clubs in one association. By 1951 the club had constructed a new stadium, but was also under pressure from East German sports authorities to merge with BSG Chemie Adlershof. They were able to resist this move but were forced into a name change, becoming Volkssport Gemeinschaft Altglienicke, which was deemed to be more politically correct. The club was also able to deflect a second attempt at amalgamation in the 60s, this time with BSG Fernsehen. After the reunification of the country the club voted to retain its identity as VSG rather than once again becoming ASV.

The club played in the tier five NOFV-Oberliga Nord in 2013–14 but, at the end of season, voluntarily withdrew to the Berlin-Liga despite finishing seventh in the league. They returned to the Oberliga in 2016 after a league championship in the Berlin-Liga, and were promoted to the Regionalliga Nordost the following year.

=== Controversy ===
VSG found itself embroiled in controversy after second-team players were alleged to have made anti-Semitic remarks and fans chanted and displayed similarly offensive slogans during a Kreisliga-B Berlin match against TuS Makkabi Berlin in October 2006. The match was ordered replayed after Makkabi left the field in protest in the 78th minute and Altglienicke was directed to play its next two matches before empty stands. Team managers and players were also required to attend anti-racism seminars or face a ban from playing in any Berlin league.

== Current squad ==
As of 8 September 2026

Note: Flags indicate national team as defined under FIFA eligibility rules; some limited exceptions apply. Players may hold more than one non-FIFA nationality.

No.	Pos.	Nation	Player
1	GK	GER	Luis Zwick
3	DF	GER	Lennart Czyborra
4	DF	GER	Sven Sonnenberg
5	DF	GER	David Kébé
8	MF	GER	Biyan Kizildemir
9	FW	GER	Emeka Oduah
10	FW	GER	Jonas Nietfeld
11	FW	GER	Dominik Shickersinsky
13	DF	GER	Damian Roßbach
14	MF	TUR	Tolga Ciğerci
16	DF	GER	Anthony Barylla
17	DF	TUR	Oğulcan Tezel
18	FW	GER	Ted Tattermusch

No.	Pos.	Nation	Player
19	FW	GER	Jonas Saliger
20	MF	GER	Philip Türpitz
21	MF	GER	Jonas Hartl
22	GK	GER	Luis Klatte
23	MF	GER	Tim Rieder
24	MF	BFA	Mohamed Sydney Sylla
25	DF	USA	John Brooks
27	DF	GER	Noah Kardam
28	MF	TUR	Ali Eren Ersungur
29	FW	GER	Kailan Meller
30	MF	GER	Erik Tallig
38	MF	GER	David Billand
39	FW	GER	Mehmet Ibrahimi

== Honours ==
=== Regional ===
- Regionalliga Nordost (IV)
  - Runners-up: 2019–20, 2020–21
- NOFV-Oberliga Nord (V)
  - Winners: 2016–17
- Berlin-Liga (VI)
  - Winners: 2011–12, 2015–16
  - Runners-up: 2010–11

=== Cup ===
- Berlin Cup
  - Winners: 2020, 2026

== Stadium ==
The club has traditionally played it home matches at the Stadion Altglienicke (capacity 2,500).
