= Miloš Ćoćić =

Serbian footballer

Personal information
- Date of birth: 5 June 2003 (age 23)
- Height: 1.83 m (6 ft 0 in)
- Positions: Winger; attacking midfielder

Team information
- Current team: Vaduz
- Number: 28

Youth career
- TSV Milbertshofen
- 2016–2021: 1860 Munich

Senior career*
Years	Team	Apps	(Gls)
2021–2024	1860 Munich	10	(1)
2021–2024	1860 Munich II	33	(6)
2024–2025	FV Illertissen	51	(16)
2026–	Vaduz	21	(5)
- * Club domestic league appearances and goals as of 9 August 2026

Miloš Ćoćić (born 5 June 2003) is a German-Serbian professional footballer who plays as a winger or attacking midfielder for Liechtensteiner Swiss Super League club Vaduz.

== Club career ==
Ćoćić joined 1860 Munich in 2016 from TSV Milbertshofen.

Miloš made his professional debut on 11 August 2021, coming on as an early 35th-minute injury substitute for Tim Linsbichler and scoring the last goal in a 3–0 Bavarian Cup win against SV Birkenfeld. He made his 3. Liga debut for 1860 Munich on 12 December that same year, playing the very last minutes of a 2–0 away win against Borussia Dortmund II. He started the 2023–24 season with an appearance against 1. FC Stockheim in the Bavarian Cup.
