= Joseph Boyamba =

German footballer (born 1996)

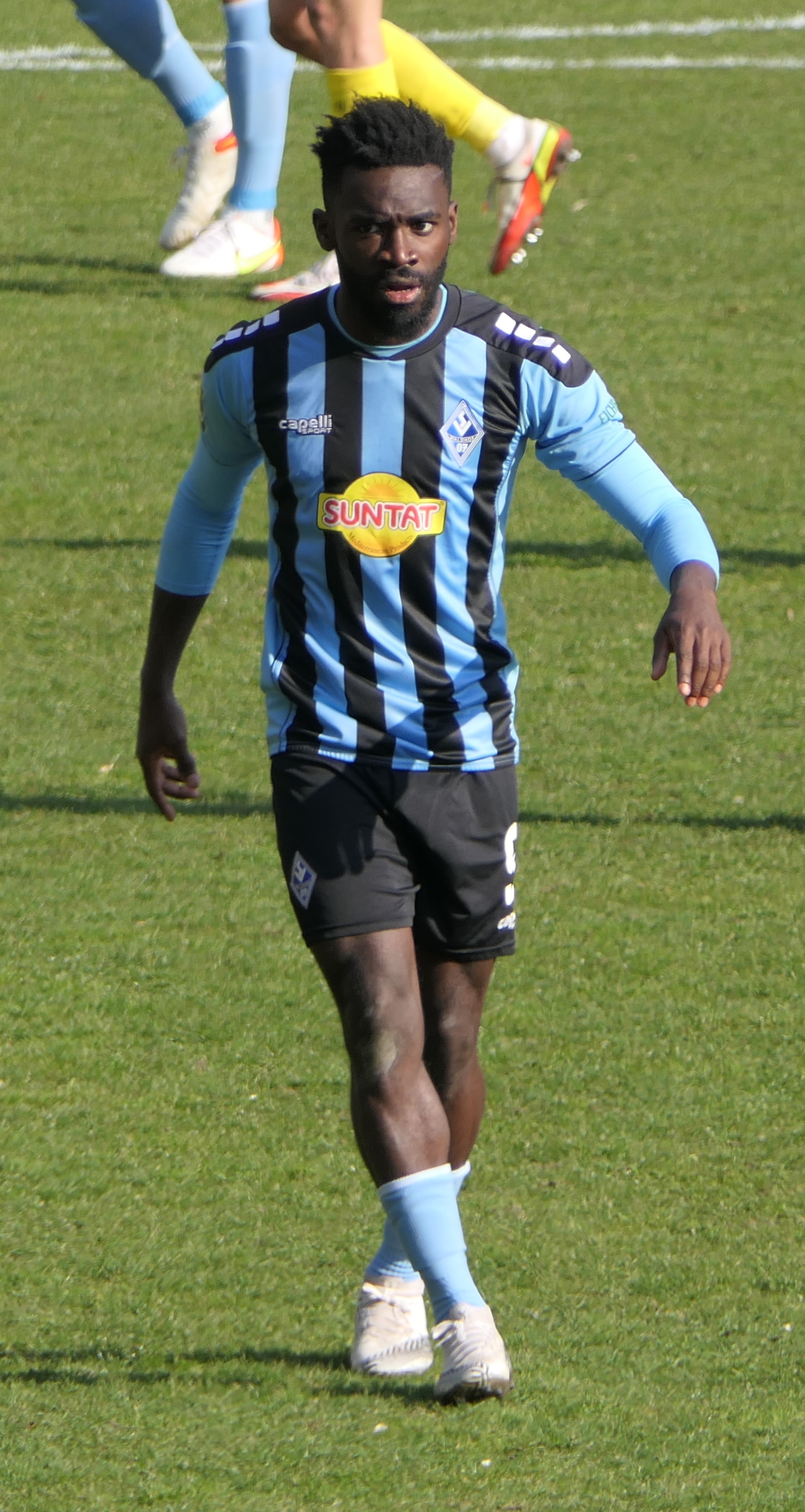

Personal information
- Date of birth: 29 July 1996 (age 30)
- Place of birth: Troisdorf, Germany
- Height: 1.72 m (5 ft 8 in)
- Position: Winger

Team information
- Current team: Borussia Dortmund II
- Number: 10

Youth career
- Sportfreunde Troisdorf
- –2011: FC Hennef
- 2011–2014: MSV Duisburg
- 2014–2015: Schalke 04

Senior career*
Years	Team	Apps	(Gls)
2015–2017	Schalke 04 II	35	(4)
2016	→ Schwarz-Weiß Rehden (loan)	13	(3)
2017–2018	SG Wattenscheid	33	(10)
2018–2020	Borussia Dortmund II	59	(24)
2020–2022	Waldhof Mannheim	68	(17)
2022–2023	1860 Munich	33	(6)
2023–2024	SV Elversberg	25	(3)
2024–2025	Rot-Weiss Essen	16	(0)
2025–	Borussia Dortmund II	26	(2)
- * Club domestic league appearances and goals as of 23 September 2026

Joseph Boyamba (born 29 July 1996) is a German professional footballer who plays as a winger for Regionalliga West club Borussia Dortmund II.

== Career ==
Boyamba joined Waldhof Mannheim of the 3. Liga in 2020. He made his professional debut for the club in the first round of the 2020–21 DFB-Pokal on 13 September 2020, coming on as a substitute in the 63rd minute for Jan-Hendrik Marx against Bundesliga side SC Freiburg, which finished as a 2–1 home loss.

On 17 June 2022, Boyamba signed with 1860 Munich.

On 2 September 2024, Boyamba joined Rot-Weiss Essen.

On 18 June 2025, he returned to Borussia Dortmund II.
