= Marius Willsch =

German professional footballer (born 1991)

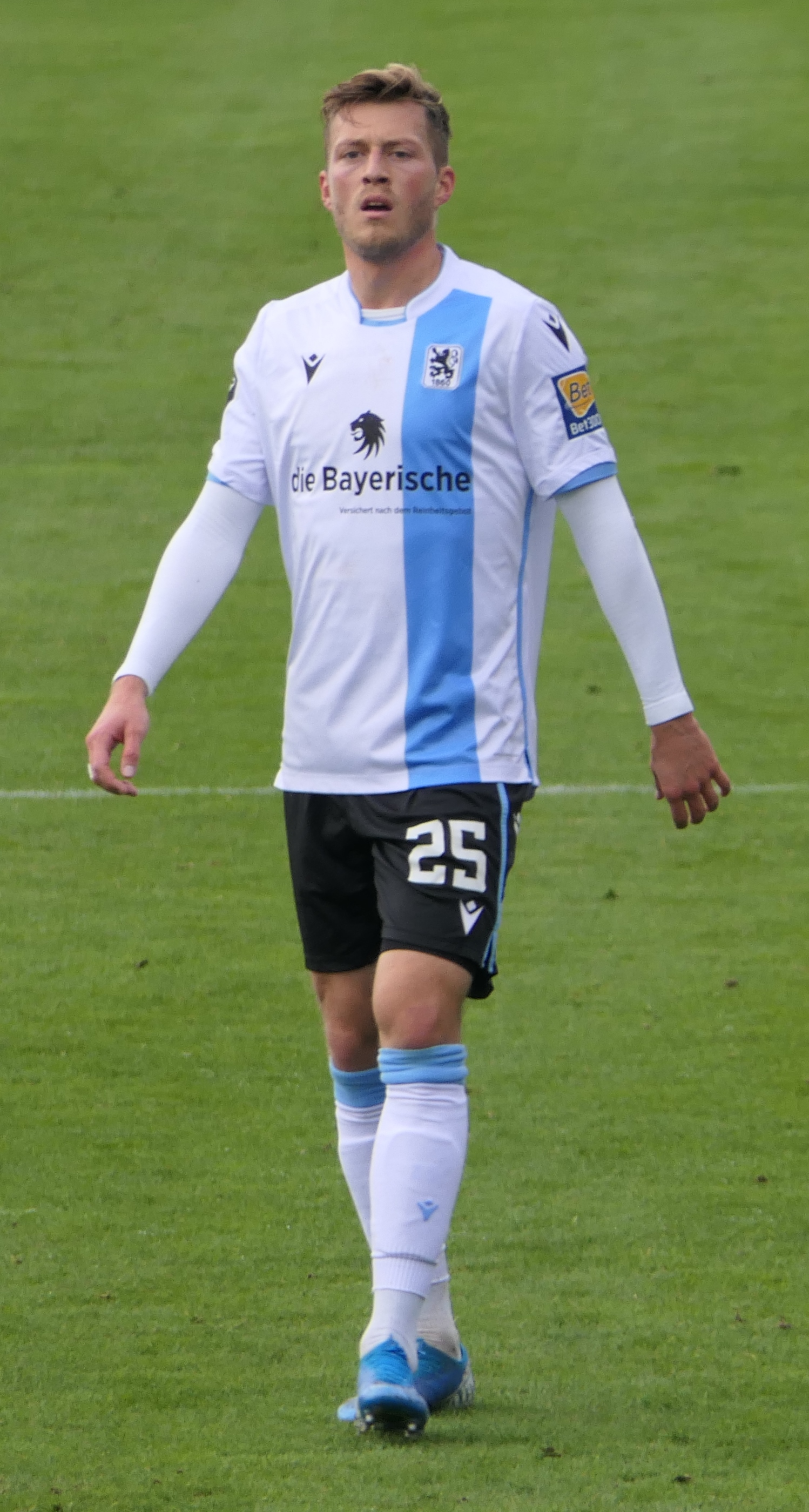
- Willsch in 2020

Personal information
- Date of birth: 18 March 1991 (age 35)
- Place of birth: Passau, Germany
- Height: 1.80 m (5 ft 11 in)
- Position: Right midfielder

Youth career
- SV Neukirchen/Inn
- SV Pocking
- Wacker Burghausen
- –2010: 1860 Munich

Senior career*
Years	Team	Apps	(Gls)
2010–2012	1860 Munich II	49	(3)
2012–2014	SpVgg Unterhaching	58	(2)
2014–2016	1. FC Saarbrücken	44	(2)
2016–2018	1. FC Schweinfurt 05	60	(13)
2018–2023	1860 Munich	104	(1)
- * Club domestic league appearances and goals

Marius Willsch (born 18 March 1991) is a German former professional footballer who played as a right midfielder.

== Career ==
Willsch began his career with 1860 Munich, and was promoted to the reserve team in 2010. He made 50 appearances in the Regionalliga Süd over the next two years, scoring three times. In July 2012 he signed for SpVgg Unterhaching of the 3. Liga, alongside team-mates Daniel Hofstetter and Marcel Kappelmaier. He left Unterhaching after two seasons and signed for 1. FC Saarbrücken. Willsch retired at the end of the 2022–23 season.

== Career statistics ==
As of match played 1 August 2020

Appearances and goals by club, season and competition
Club	Season	League			DFB-Pokal		Other		Total	
Club	Season	Division	Apps	Goals	Apps	Goals	Apps	Goals	Apps	Goals
1860 Munich II	2010–11	Regionalliga Süd	4	0	—		—		4	0
1860 Munich II	2011–12	Regionalliga Süd	1	1	—		—		1	1
1860 Munich II	Total		5	1	—		0	0	5	1
SpVgg Unterhaching	2012–13	3. Liga	35	2	0	0	—		35	2
SpVgg Unterhaching	2013–14	3. Liga	23	0	—		—		23	0
SpVgg Unterhaching	Total		58	2	0	0	—		58	2
1. FC Saarbrücken	2014–15	Regionalliga Südwest	27	1	—		—		27	1
1. FC Saarbrücken	2015–16	Regionalliga Südwest	17	1	—		—		17	1
1. FC Saarbrücken	Total		44	2	0	0	0	0	44	2
1. FC Schweinfurt 05	2016–17	Regionalliga Bayern	29	7	—		—		29	7
1. FC Schweinfurt 05	2017–18	Regionalliga Bayern	31	6	2	1	—		33	7
1. FC Schweinfurt 05	Total		60	13	2	1	0	0	62	14
1860 Munich	2018–19	3. Liga	19	0	1	0	—		20	0
1860 Munich	2019–20	3. Liga	36	0	—		—		36	0
1860 Munich	Total		55	0	1	0	0	0	56	0
Career total			222	18	3	1	0	0	225	19
