= Fabian Greilinger =

German footballer

Personal information
- Date of birth: 13 September 2000 (age 26)
- Place of birth: Eggenfelden, Germany
- Height: 1.76 m (5 ft 9 in)
- Position: Winger

Team information
- Current team: SV Wehen Wiesbaden
- Number: 18

Youth career
- FC Julbach-Kirchdorf
- –2015: Wacker Burghausen
- 2015–2019: 1860 Munich

Senior career*
Years	Team	Apps	(Gls)
2017–2021	1860 Munich II	21	(4)
2019–2024	1860 Munich	118	(5)
2024–	SV Wehen Wiesbaden	64	(1)
- * Club domestic league appearances and goals as of 29 May 2026

Fabian Greilinger (born 13 September 2000) is a German professional footballer who plays as a winger for 3. Liga club SV Wehen Wiesbaden.

== Career ==
Born in Eggenfelden, Greilinger made his professional debut for 1860 Munich on 19 July 2019, coming on as a substitute in the 78th minute for Marius Willsch in a 1–1 home draw against Preußen Münster. He started the 2023–24 season with an appearance against 1. FC Stockheim in the Bavarian Cup.

On 26 June 2024, Greilinger signed with SV Wehen Wiesbaden in 3. Liga.
