= Yannick Deichmann =

German footballer

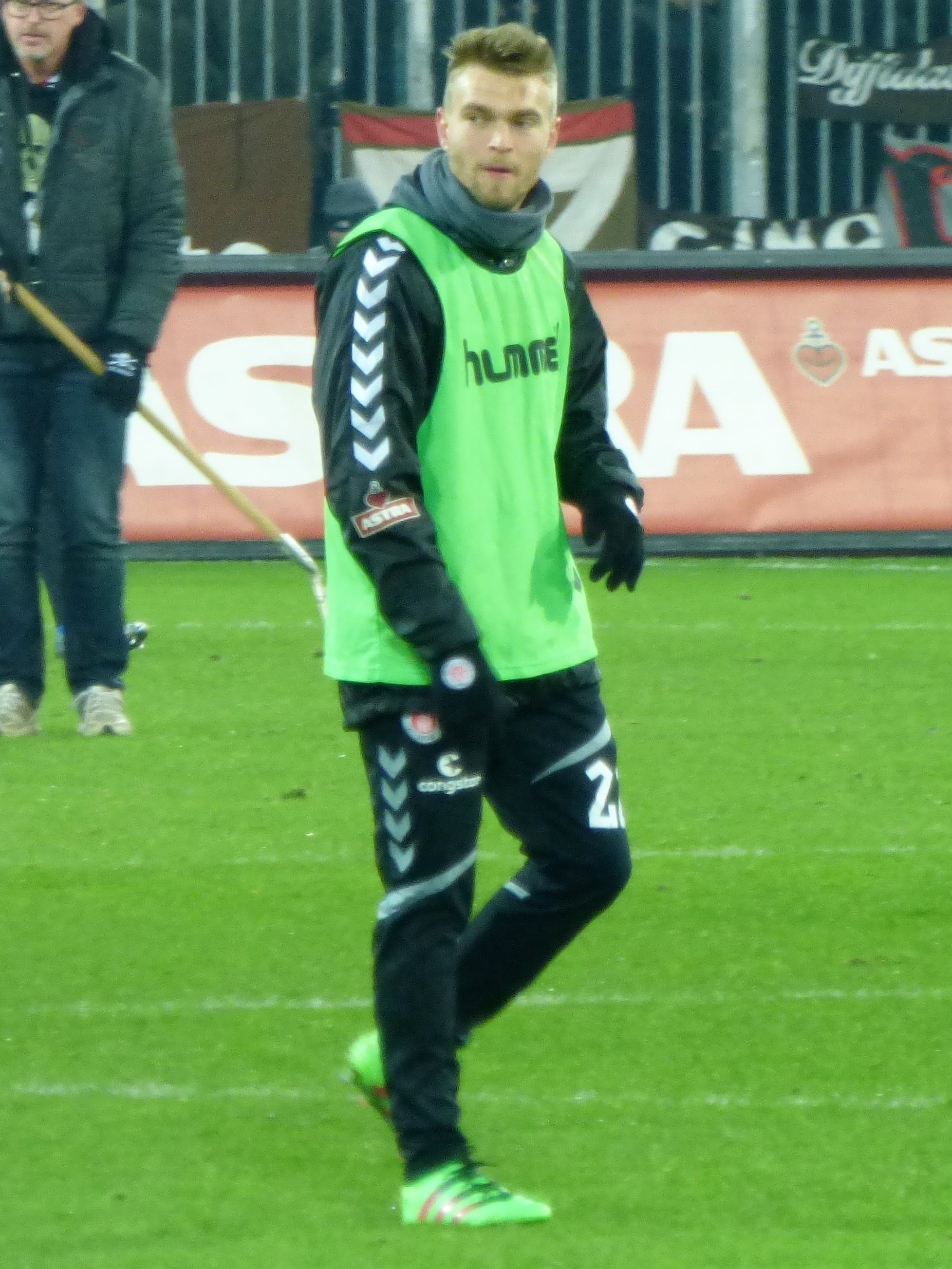
- Deichmann with FC St. Pauli in 2016

Personal information
- Date of birth: 13 August 1994 (age 32)
- Place of birth: Hamburg, Germany
- Height: 1.78 m (5 ft 10 in)
- Position: Midfielder

Team information
- Current team: FC Ingolstadt
- Number: 20

Youth career
- 2010–2012: Hamburger SV
- 2012–2013: Borussia Dortmund

Senior career*
Years	Team	Apps	(Gls)
2013–2016	FC St. Pauli II	60	(4)
2015–2016	FC St. Pauli	4	(0)
2016–2017	VfR Aalen	19	(1)
2017–2021	VfB Lübeck	126	(24)
2021–2023	1860 Munich	69	(7)
2023–	FC Ingolstadt	90	(9)
- * Club domestic league appearances and goals as of 29 May 2026

Yannick Deichmann (born 13 August 1994) is a German professional footballer who plays as a midfielder for 3. Liga club FC Ingolstadt.

== Career ==
In May 2016, Deichmann signed for 3. Liga side VfR Aalen.

On 18 June 2021 it was announced that Deichmann had signed with 3. Liga side 1860 Munich.

On 21 June 2023, Deichmann agreed to move to FC Ingolstadt.
