= Florian Hinterberger =

German footballer (born 1958)

Personal information
- Date of birth: 8 December 1958 (age 67)
- Place of birth: Germany
- Position: Midfielder

Senior career*
Years	Team	Apps	(Gls)
–1978	SpVgg SV Weiden		
1978–1982	SpVgg Greuther Fürth	119	(18)
1982–1984	SC Fortuna Köln	66	(7)
1984–1990	Bayer 04 Leverkusen	105	(2)
1990–1992	TSV 1860 Munich	31	(2)
- * Club domestic league appearances and goals

Florian Hinterberger (born 8 December 1958) is a German former footballer who played as a midfielder.

== Early life ==
Hinterberger grew up in Weiden in der Oberpfalz, Germany. He sung in a choir as a child.

== Career ==
Hinterberger started his career with German side SpVgg SV Weiden. In 1978, he signed for German side SpVgg Greuther Fürth. In 1982, he signed for German side SC Fortuna Köln. He helped the club achieve second place at the 1983 DFB-Pokal. In 1984, he signed for German side Bayer 04 Leverkusen. He helped the club win the 1988 UEFA Cup. In 1990, he signed for German side TSV 1860 Munich.
