= SC Fortuna Köln =

German football club

Fortuna Köln
- Full name: Sport-Club Fortuna Köln e.V.
- Founded: 1948; 78 years ago
- Ground: Südstadion
- Capacity: 11,748
- Chairman: Hanns-Jörg Westendorf
- Head coach: Matthias Mink
- League: 3. Liga
- 2025–26: Regionalliga West, 1st of 18 (promoted)
Home colours	Away colours

SC Fortuna Köln is a German association football club based in the city of Cologne, North Rhine-Westphalia.

== History ==
Logo of predecessor side Victoria Köln 1911

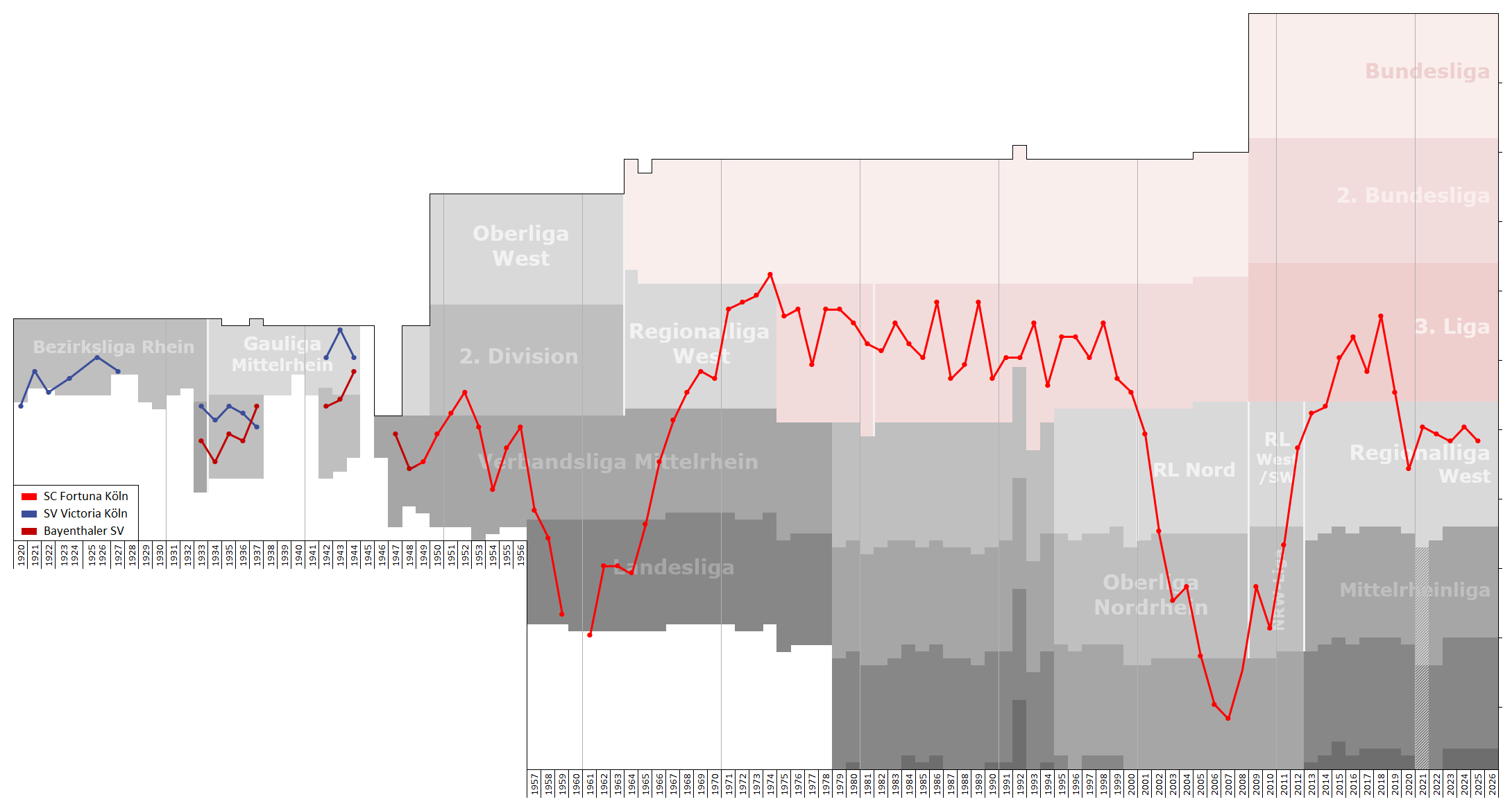
Historical chart of Fortuna league performance

The club was formed as on 21 February 1948 through the merger of three local sides: Victoria Köln 1911 (one of two clubs to bear the name), Bayenthaler SV 1920, and Sparkassen-Verein Köln 1927. Of these clubs, Victoria had the best results, winning its way to the first division of the Gauliga Köln-Aachen in 1941 and capturing the division title there the following season. Bayenthaler SV 1920 side also spent a season in the Gauliga in 1943–44 before the division collapsed as war overtook the region. In 1976, SC Fortuna Köln was joined by FC Alter Markt Köln.

Through most of the last four decades Fortuna has played as a second division side. Highlights of the club's history include promotion to the Bundesliga for the 1974 season and an impressive run through the 1983 DFB-Pokal. The team took out SC Freiburg in the first round and eked out a win on penalties over SSV Ulm 1846 in their next match. They then eliminated three first division sides in a row: first Eintracht Braunschweig and Borussia Mönchengladbach, before crushing Borussia Dortmund 5–0 in their semi-final match. This put them into the final against hometown rivals 1. FC Köln, the first time the Cup final had come down to a local derby. Although they outplayed their opposition, Fortuna's magic had run out and they lost 0–1 on a late goal by Pierre Littbarski.

In 1986, the side came close to a return to the Bundesliga, but was beaten by Borussia Dortmund in the promotion round. Each team had won their home match in a two-game series, which forced a third contest under the rules in effect at the time. Instead of advancing on the strength of away goals, Fortuna was crushed 0–8 by Borussia Dortmund. A handful of seasons later the club avoided relegation to third-tier football at the end of the 1991–92 schedule only when division rivals Blau-Weiß 90 Berlin were denied a licence.

One of the key features of Fortuna's history was the presidency of deep-pocketed Jean Löring. Beginning in 1967, the millionaire's support of the club helped them to continue to field competitive sides for much longer than they might otherwise have. In 1982, he even helped out in another way: trained as an electrician, he personally fixed the floodlights when they failed during a match against SV Darmstadt 98 so the game could go on. Löring, who had been an Oberliga player himself with Alemannia Aachen in his younger years, was ousted as president in 2000 and the club soon deteriorated. In 2005 the club failed financially and was forced to withdraw from league play.

Since 2008, the club has been owned (like Ebbsfleet United F.C.) partially by the web-based venture deinfussballclub.de. Until 2008, the SCF played in the fifth division Verbandsliga Mittelrhein, gaining promotion with a second-place finish to the new Oberliga Nordrhein-Westfalen. Fortuna Köln finished Oberliga as ninth in 2008–09, as 15th in 2009–10 season and as third in 2010–2011 saison. From the 2011–12 season the club played in the Regionalliga West until in 2014 they won that league and beat the second team of Bayern Munich to get promoted to the German third league.

Despite insolvency, the club was able to salvage its youth department, one of the largest in Germany with over 500 players on 25 teams, through a fundraising campaign organized by the former chairman Egbert Bischoff that included a benefit game against 1. FC Köln.

Recent chairman Klaus Ulonska once competed in the 1962 European Championships in Athletics, co-winning the 4 × 100 m Relay.

== Honours ==
=== League ===
- Regionalliga West (IV)
  - Winners: (2) 2013–14, 2025–26
- Verbandsliga Mittelrhein (V)
  - Winners: 2007–08

=== Cups ===
- DFB-Pokal
  - Runners-up: 1982–83
- Middle Rhine Cup
  - Winners: 2012–13

== Players ==
=== Current squad ===
As of 3 September 2026

Note: Flags indicate national team as defined under FIFA eligibility rules; some limited exceptions apply. Players may hold more than one non-FIFA nationality.

No.	Pos.	Nation	Player
1	GK	GER	Lennart Winkler
2	DF	GER	Kevin Krumme (on loan from SC Paderborn II)
3	DF	GER	Maximilian Fischer
4	DF	KOS	Vleron Statovci
5	DF	GER	Seymour Fünger
6	MF	GER	Tom Geerkens
7	MF	GER	Nico Thier
8	MF	GER	Luca Majetic
9	FW	GER	Enzo Wirtz
10	FW	GER	Rafael Garcia
11	MF	GER	Georg Strauch
13	DF	GER	Jasper Löffelsend
14	MF	GER	Cedric Harenbrock
15	DF	GER	David Kamm Al-Azzawe
16	MF	GER	Jonas Michelbrink

No.	Pos.	Nation	Player
17	DF	GER	Florian Heister
18	FW	GER	Hamadi Al Ghaddioui
19	FW	GER	Timo Bornemann
20	MF	POL	Adrian Stanilewicz
21	FW	GER	Suheyel Najar
22	DF	GER	Robin Afamefuna (captain)
23	MF	GER	David Savic
25	GK	GER	Ben Zich
27	DF	GER	Kevin Brechmann
30	FW	GER	Romeo Aigbekaen (on loan from St. Pauli II)
31	DF	GER	Neo Telle
33	GK	GER	Lennart Stollenwerk
37	FW	GER	Jannik Mause
38	MF	GER	Bennit Bröger (on loan from SC Paderborn)

== Recent seasons ==
The recent season-by-season performance of the club:

Year	Division	Tier	Position
1967–68	Regionalliga West	II	16th
1972–73	Regionalliga West	II	2nd ↑
1973–74	1. Bundesliga	I	17th ↓
1999–2000	2. Bundesliga	II	16th ↓
2000–01	Regionalliga Nord	III	4th
2001–02	Regionalliga Nord	III	18th ↓
2002–03	Oberliga Nordrhein	IV	10th
2003–04	Oberliga Nordrhein	IV	8th
2004–05	Oberliga Nordrhein	IV	18th ↓
2005–06	Verbandsliga Mittelrhein	V	7th
2006–07	Verbandsliga Mittelrhein	V	9th
2007–08	Verbandsliga Mittelrhein	V	2nd ↑
2008–09	NRW-Liga	V	9th
2009–10	NRW-Liga	V	14th
2010–11	NRW-Liga	V	3rd ↑
2011–12	Regionalliga West	IV	7th
2012–13	Regionalliga West	IV	2nd
2013–14	Regionalliga West	IV	1st ↑
2014–15	3. Liga	III	14th
2015–16	3. Liga	III	11th
2016–17	3. Liga	III	16th
2017–18	3. Liga	III	8th
2018–19	3. Liga	III	19th ↓
2019–20	Regionalliga West	IV	10th
2020–21	Regionalliga West	IV	4th
2021–22	Regionalliga West	IV	5th
2022–23	Regionalliga West	IV	6th
2023–24	Regionalliga West	IV	4th
2024–25	Regionalliga West	IV	6th
2025–26	Regionalliga West	IV	1st ↑

Key

↑ Promoted	↓ Relegated

== Women's football ==
The women's football department was founded 2003 and has experienced rapid growth. The team had been often qualified as winner of the Middle Rhine Cup for the DFB-Pokal Frauen.

The women's team mostly competed in the third-tier Regionalliga West. In the 2024–25 DFB-Pokal Frauen, the team reached the Round of 16.

=== Famous Fortuna players ===
- Sara Doorsoun
- Arzu Karabulut
- Isabelle Linden
