= TSV 1860 Munich II =

German football club, based in Munich

- Full name: Turn- und Sportverein München von 1860
- Nicknames: Die (kleinen) Löwen (The (little) Lions), Die Sechzger ("Sixties" in Bavarian)
- Founded: 17 May 1860
- Ground: Kies-Arena im Sportpark
- Capacity: 4,000
- President: Gernot Mang
- Head coach: Alper Kayabunar
- League: Bayernliga Süd (V)
- 2024–25: Bayernliga Süd, 2nd of 18
| Home colours | Away colours | Third colours |

TSV 1860 Munich II (German: TSV 1860 München II) is the reserve team of German football club TSV 1860 Munich, based in Munich, Bavaria. The side competed as TSV 1860 München Amateure until 2005. It competes in the fifth-tier Bayernliga Süd. Within the club structure it functions as an under-21 squad, bridging the pathway from youth football to the first team.

As a second team it takes part in the German league pyramid in its own right and is eligible for promotion as high as the 3. Liga, subject to reserve-team regulations and the prohibition on playing in the same division as the senior side. The team's remit is player development, providing competitive senior football for academy graduates and over-age returnees, and supplying match practice to first-team squad members recovering from injury.

== History ==
=== 1959 to 1963 ===
1860's amateur team first won promotion to Bavarias highest football league, then the tier-three Amateurliga Südbayern, in 1959, when it took out the title in the 2. Amateurliga Oberbayern and then won the Oberbayern final against FSV Pfaffenhofen. The Amateurliga Südbayern was then one of two leagues at this level in Bavaria, covering the southern half of the state while the Amateurliga Nordbayern existed in parallel in the north.

TSV 1860 München Amateure, as the team was then known as, was the third reserve side to reach this level in Bavaria, pre-dated only by 1. FC Nuremberg II and FC Bayern Munich II.

The team finished an excellent second in its first year in the third division, five points behind TSV Schwaben Augsburg. The following season, 1960–61, the team won its league, with Bayern Munich's reserve side coming second. 1860's amateur side was however ineligible for promotion as reserve teams could not rise above third division level. The team also declined participation in the Bavarian championship finals against northern champions 1. FC Haßfurt as nine players had left the side already to join other clubs.

With this loss, the team was uncompetitive the following season, finishing fourteenth in the league and narrowly avoiding relegation. With the reorganisation of the German football league system in 1963, it became part of the new tier-four Landesliga Bayern-Süd after finishing fifteenth in the league when a top-seven finish was needed.

=== 1963 to 1982 ===
In its first season in the Landesliga, 1860 narrowly avoided relegation to the Bezirksliga, finishing twelfth in the league. It turned fortunes around the following season, coming second behind SpVgg Kaufbeuren, but only the champion of the league was promoted in this era. Another runners-up finish followed in 1967, this time to FC Bayern Munich II.

The team finished in mid-field in the following years but suffered another relegation in 1971, now to the tier-five Bezirksliga. The team's decline went in line with the club's first team's relegation from the Bundesliga in 1970.

1860 Amateure returned to the Landesliga in 1973 and earned another runners-up finish in its first year back. In 1976, the team once more was relegated to the Bezirksliga.

The team once more returned from the Bezirksliga in 1980 and finished as runners-up in the Landesliga in 1981-82. Since 1981, the Landesliga runners-up were entitled to participate in a Bayernliga promotion round, but the 1860 club itself was struck by disaster and its reserve team was withdrawn instead. What happened was that TSV 1860 had its 2. Bundesliga licence revoked and was forcefully relegated to the tier-three Amateur Oberliga Bayern, the Bayernliga.

=== 1982 to present ===
The team started its road to recovery when it won the tier-six Bezirksliga Oberbayern-Süd in 1990, to earn promotion to the Bezirksoberliga Oberbayern. The team missed out on another promotion the following year, when it came equal second in the Bezirksoberliga but lost a decider to FC Miesbach. It took until 1995 for the side to return for another attempt at promotion, when a second-place finish meant a return to the Landesliga.

Back in the Landesliga, the team won another promotion on first try, winning the league and moving up to the Bayernliga for the first time since 1963.

There, 1860 won its fourth promotion in four years, taking out another league title and moving up to the tier-three Regionalliga Süd. The team spend the next four seasons in the Regionalliga, earning mid-table results in its first three seasons, but suffering relegation in 2001.

Three years in the Bayernliga followed, in which the team finished runners-up twice before taking out the title once more in 2004.

Back in the Regionalliga, the side became a struggler against relegation. In 2005, the team, like all reserve sides of Bundesliga and 2. Bundesliga teams, changed its name permanently from Amateure to Second team, becoming TSV 1860 München II. In case of 1860, the team had already carried that name during the first team's time in the Bayernliga.

With the establishment of the 3. Liga in 2008, the Regionalliga slipped to fourth tier, but also lost most of its top teams to the new league. In 2008–09, the team performed much better, finishing sixth in the league. The club enjoyed a very successful 2012–13 season, now in the Regionalliga Bayern, where it won the league championship and qualified for the play-offs to the 3. Liga but missed out on promotion when it lost to SV Elversberg 3–4 on aggregate. The following two seasons the team finished third in the Regionalliga.

Because the first team relegated to 3. Liga and subsequently failed to pay the required license fee in June 2017, they relegated to Regionalliga Bayern and the reserve team, although finishing the 2016–17 season as second, relegated to Bayernliga Süd, the fifth German football tier.

== Honours ==
The club's honours:

=== League ===
- Amateurliga Bayern-Süd (III)
  - Champions: 1961
- Regionalliga Bayern (IV)
  - Champions: 2013
- Bayernliga (IV)
  - Champions: (2) 1997, 2004
  - Runners-up: (2) 2002, 2003
- 2. Amateurliga Oberbayern A (IV)
  - Champions: 1959
- Landesliga Bayern-Süd (V)
  - Champions: 1996
  - Runners-up: (4) 1965, 1967, 1974, 1982
- Bezirksliga Oberbayern-Ost (V)
  - Champions: 1973
- Bezirksoberliga Oberbayern (VI)
  - Runners-up: 1995
- Bezirksliga Oberbayern-Süd (VI)
  - Champions: 1990

=== Cup ===
- Oberbayern Cup
  - Winner: (3) 1997, 1998, 2003

== Squad ==
=== Squad ===
Note: Flags indicate national team as defined under FIFA eligibility rules; some limited exceptions apply. Players may hold more than one non-FIFA nationality.

| No. | Pos. | Nation | Player |
|---|---|---|---|
| 1 | GK | GER | Maximilian Rothdauscher |
| 2 | DF | GER | Julius Thönig |
| 4 | DF | GER | Yannik Seils |
| 5 | DF | GER | Carlos Mila-Beier |
| 6 | MF | GER | Tim Kloss |
| 7 | FW | GER | Samir Neziri |
| 8 | MF | GER | Moritz Bangerter |
| 9 | FW | GER | Lorenz Knöferl |
| 10 | MF | CRO | Claudio Milican |
| 11 | MF | GER | Leon Tutić |
| 16 | MF | BIH | Damjan Dordan |
| 17 | MF | GER | Alessio Thies |
| 18 | MF | GER | Philip Kuhn |
| 19 | FW | GER | Matija Radonjić |

| No. | Pos. | Nation | Player |
|---|---|---|---|
| 20 | MF | TUR | Devin Sür |
| 21 | DF | GER | Ahanna Agbowo |
| 22 | DF | GER | Colin Beutel |
| 23 | DF | GER | Alexander Mehring |
| 24 | GK | FIN | Julius Schmid |
| 25 | DF | GER | Teo Marošević |
| 27 | DF | GER | Moritz Rem |
| 28 | GK | GER | Muck Riedmüller |
| 29 | DF | USA | Mason Judge |
| 30 | MF | GER | Miloš Ćoćić |
| 32 | DF | GER | Linus Becwar |
| 33 | MF | GER | Maximilian Karl |
| 34 | MF | GER | Tobias Seidl |
| 35 | FW | USA | Mansour Ouro-Tagba |

== Coaching history ==
List coaches of the club:

| Name | From | Until |
|---|---|---|
| Florian Hinterberger | 1 July 2001 | 30 June 2003 |
| Reiner Maurer | 1 July 2003 | 30 June 2004 |
| Alfons Higl | 1 July 2004 | 30 June 2006 |
| Marco Kurz | 1 July 2006 | 17 March 2007 |
| Klaus Koschlick | 18 March 2007 | 30 June 2007 |
| Uwe Wolf | 1 July 2007 | 30 June 2008 |
| Dieter Märkle | 1 July 2008 | 30 June 2010 |
| Bernhard Winkler | 1 July 2010 | 31 August 2011 |
| Alexander Schmidt | 31 August 2011 | 20 December 2012 |
| Markus von Ahlen | 20 December 2012 | 5 June 2013 |
| Torsten Fröhling | 5 June 2013 | 17 February 2015 |
| Daniel Bierofka | 18 February 2015 | 18 April 2016 |
| Marijan Kovačević (interim) | 19 April 2016 | 9 May 2016 |
| Daniel Bierofka | 10 May 2016 | 21 November 2016 |
| Michael Kokocinski (interim) | 22 November 2016 | 11 December 2016 |
| Daniel Bierofka | 12 November 2016 | 30 June 2017 |
| Wolfgang Schellenberg | 1 July 2017 | 31 December 2017 |
| Christian Wörns | 1 January 2018 | 30 June 2018 |
| Sebastian Lubojanski | 1 July 2018 | 30 June 2019 |
| Frank Schmöller | 1 July 2019 | Present |

== Recent seasons ==
The recent season-by-season performance of the club:

| Season | Division | Tier | Position |
|---|---|---|---|
| 1999–2000 | Regionalliga Süd | III | 7th |
| 2000-01 | Regionalliga Süd | III | 16th ↓ |
| 2001-02 | Bayernliga | IV | 2nd |
| 2002-03 | Bayernliga | IV | 2nd |
| 2003-04 | Bayernliga | IV | 1st ↑ |
| 2004-05 | Regionalliga Süd | III | 15th |
| 2005-06 | Regionalliga Süd | III | 15th |
| 2006-07 | Regionalliga Süd | III | 13th |
| 2007-08 | Regionalliga Süd | III | 13th |
| 2008-09 | Regionalliga Süd | IV | 6th |
| 2009-10 | Regionalliga Süd | IV | 7th |
| 2010–11 | Regionalliga Süd | IV | 8th |
| 2011–12 | Regionalliga Süd | IV | 13th |
| 2012–13 | Regionalliga Bayern | IV | 1st |
| 2013–14 | Regionalliga Bayern | IV | 3rd |
| 2014–15 | Regionalliga Bayern | IV | 3rd |
| 2015–16 | Regionalliga Bayern | IV | 10th |
| 2016–17 | Regionalliga Bayern | IV | 18th ↓ |
| 2017–18 | Bayernliga Süd | V | 14th |
| 2018–19 | Bayernliga Süd | V | 10th |
| 2019–20 | Bayernliga Süd | V | 6th |
| 2020–21 | Bayernliga Süd | V | 7th |
| 2021–22 | Bayernliga Süd | V | 7th |
| 2022–23 | Bayernliga Süd | V | 8th |
| 2023-24 | Bayernliga Süd | V | |

- With the introduction of the Bezirksoberligas in 1988 as the new fifth tier, below the Landesligas, all leagues below dropped one tier. With the introduction of the Regionalligas in 1994 and the 3. Liga in 2008 as the new third tier, below the 2. Bundesliga, all leagues below dropped one tier. With the establishment of the Regionalliga Bayern as the new fourth tier in Bavaria in 2012 the Bayernliga was split into a northern and a southern division, the number of Landesligas expanded from three to five and the Bezirksoberligas abolished. All leagues from the Bezirksligas onward were elevated one tier.

| ↑ Promoted | ↓ Relegated |
