= 2023–24 TSV 1860 Munich season =

1860 Munich
2023–24 season
- President: Robert Reisinger
- Head coach: Maurizio Jacobacci (until 5 December); Argiris Giannikis (from 10 January)
- Stadium: Grünwalder Stadion
- 3. Liga: 15th
- Bavarian Cup: Quarter-finals
- Top goalscorer: League: Julian Guttau (7); All: Fynn Lakenmacher (8)
Home colours	Away colours	Third colours

The 2023–24 TSV 1860 Munich season was the club's sixth consecutive season in the 3. Liga. 1860 Munich won promotion to the 3. Liga after winning their Regionalliga playoff against 1. FC Saarbrücken.

1860 Munich's pre–season started on 24 June 2023 and their first pre–season match was a 0–0 draw against TSV Wasserburg. 1860 Munich's pre–season schedule finished with a 2–0 loss to VfB Stuttgart. 1860 Munixch's first match was a 5–1 win against 1. FC Stockheim in the Bavarian Cup on 2 August 2023 and their first league match was a 2–0 win against Waldhof Mannheim three days later.

== Season events ==
=== Pre-season ===
1860 Munich's pre–season started on 24 June 2023. 1860 Munich's first pre–season match was on 25 June 2023 against TSV Wasserburg. The match finished in a 0–0 draw. In their next two pre–season matches, 1860 Munich lost to Austrian clubs SV Ried and LASK. 1860 Munich failed to score against either club. The 3. Liga schedule came out on 7 July 2023. On 9 July 2023, 1860 Munich defeated FC Memmingen 4–0 to win their first pre–season match. On 21 July 2023, Jesper Verlaat was named the new captain of the club. Marco Hiller, Tim Rieder, and Albion Vrenezi were named vice–captains of the club. On 22 July 2023, 1860 Munich first faced 1. FC Nürnberg then they faced SpVgg Unterhaching. In the first game, Nürnberg defeated 1860 Munich 3–0. In the second game, 1860 Munich lost 1–0 to Unterhaching. Michael Glück and Daniel Winkler were injured during pre–season. 1860 Munich responded by signing central defender Leroy Kwadwo. On 29 July 2023, 1860 Munich faced Borussia Mönchengladbach and VfB Stuttgart. In the first match, 1860 Munich lost 2–1 to Borussia Mönchengladbach. In the second match, 1860 Munich lost 2–0 to VfB Stuttgart. Maurizio Jacobacci wanted to loan out Fynn Lakenmacher. However, Lakenmacher decided against being loaned out.

==== August ====
1860 Munich's opening league match of the season was against Waldhof Mannheim. Maurizio Jacobacci stated that Michael Glück will miss the opening match against Waldhof Mannheim; will be out until August 15, 2023; and is unclear if he will play in the second league match against MSV Duisburg. On5 August 2023, 1860 Munich defeated Waldhof Mannheim 2–0 with an own goal from Jan-Christoph Bartels and a goal from Fynn Lakenmacher. Kaan Kurt, Leroy Kwadwo, Julian Guttau, Manfred Starke, Morris Schröter, and Valmir Sulejmani made their league debuts for 1860 Munich. 1860 Munich finished matchday one in third place. Five days after their opening 3. Liga match, 1860 Munich signed Joël Zwarts from Jahn Regensburg. 1860 Munich played MSV Duisburg on 19 August 2023, which 1860 Munich won 3–0. 1860 Munich got two goals from Joël Zwarts and a goal from Manfred Starke. 1860 Munich finished matchday two in first place. On 22 August 2023, on matchday three, 1860 Munich suffered their first loss and gave up their first goals against of the league season. They lost 2–1 to VfB Lübeck. 1860 Munich got a goal from Julian Guttau. VfB Lübeck got an own goal from Fabian Greilinger and a goal from Tarik Gözüsirin. On matchday three, 1860 Munich dropped back down to third place. They had been in third place after matchday one was completed. On 26 August 2011, 1860 Munich lost their second straight match after losing 3–0 to SV Sandhausen. SV Sandhausen's goalscorers were Lion Schuster, Christoph Ehlich, and Sebastian Stolze. 1860 Munich finished matchday four in sixth place.

==== September ====
1860 Munich started September with a match against Erzgebirge Aue, which took place on 2 September 2023 at Grünwalder Stadion in Munich. Joël Zwarts scored for 1860 Munich. Marcel Bär, who transferred away from 1860 Munich during the summer, and Maximilian Thiel scored for Erzgebirge Aue. This was 1860 Munich's third loss in a row. 1860 Munich finished matchday five in 12th place. On 16 September 2023, 1860 Munich lost their fourth consecutive match. FC Ingolstadt 04 won the match 2–1. Julian Guttau scored for 1860 Munich and Jannik Mause and David Kopacz scored for FC Ingolstadt 04. 1860 Munich dropped down to 16th place, one place above the relegation zone. On 23 September 2023, 1860 Munich took on Hallescher FC at Leuna Chemie Stadion in Halle. 1860 Munich won 2–0 with goals from Morris Schröter and Julian Guttau. Manfred Starke was sent–off during the match. 1860 Munich moved up to 11th place. 1860 Munich finished September with a match against SC Verl. the match took place on 30 September at Grünwalder Stadion in Munich. 1860 Munich won the match 1–0 with an own goal from Torge Paetow. Manfred Starke was suspended for the match. 1860 Munich finished matchday eight in 10th place.

==== October ====
1860 Munich started October with a match against SSV Ulm 1846. The match took place on 3 October 2023 at Donaustadion in Ulm. SSV Ulm 1846 won 1–0 with a goal from Bastian Allgeier. 1860 Munich and Preußen Münster finished matchday nine tied for 11th place. 1860 Munich's next match happened against Dynamo Dresden on 7 October 2023 at Grünwalder Stadion in Munich. The match finished in a 0–0 draw. 1860 Munich supporters were critical of Maurizio Jacobacci during the match. They held a banner saying "if the fireworks only crack in the stands, the coach is out of place". 1860 Munich finished matchday 10 in 13th place. 1860 Munich face Preußen Münster on 15 October 2023 at Preußenstadion in Münster. The match finished in a 1–1 draw. Joël Zwarts scored for 1860 Munich and Simon Scherder scored for Preußen Münster. 1860 Munich finished matchday 11 in 14th place. 1860 Munich faced SC Freiburg II on 21 October 2023 at Grünwalder Stadion in Munich. 1860 Munich won 2–0 with an own goal from Ryan Johansson and a goal from Eroll Zejnullahu. 1860 Munich finished matchday 12 in eighth place. 1860 Munich finished October with a 2–1 loss to Viktoria Köln. Morris Schröter scored for 1860 Munich and Luca Marseiler and Michael Schultz scored for Viktoria Köln. Leroy Kwadwo, Morris Schröter, and Head Coach Maurizio Jacobacci were all sent–off during the match. The match took place on 28 October 2023 in front of 4,683 spectators. 1860 Munich finished October in 13th place.

==== November ====
1860 Munich started November with a match against Jahn Regensburg The match took place on 4 November 2023 in Munich. 1860 Munich lost the match 1–0. Tobias Eisenhuth scored Jahn Regensburg. 1860 Munich finished matchday 14 in 14th place. On matchday 15, 1860 Munich defeated 1. FC Saarbrücken 3–2. 1860 Munich got two goals from Morris Schröter and a goal from Niklas Lang. 1860 Munich finished matchday 15 in 12th place. 1860 Munich finished November with a match against SpVgg Unterhaching. SpVgg Unterhaching won 1–0 with a goal from Mathias Fetsch. 1860 Munich finished November in 14th place.

==== December ====
1860 Munich started December with a match against Borussia Dortmund II. The match took place at Stadion Rote Erde in Dortmund. Borussia Dortmund II won the match 3–0 with goals from Ole Pohlmann, Julian Hettwer, and Ayman Azhil. 1860 Munich finished matchday 17 in 15th place. Maurizio Jacobacci was sacked as head coach two days later. Frank Schmöller immediately took over as interim head coach.

== Players ==
=== Current squad ===
As of 1 February 2024

Note: Flags indicate national team as defined under FIFA eligibility rules; some limited exceptions apply. Players may hold more than one non-FIFA nationality.

No.	Pos.	Nation	Player
1	GK	GER	Marco Hiller
2	DF	GER	Kaan Kurt
4	DF	NED	Jesper Verlaat (captain)
5	MF	KOS	Eroll Zejnullahu
6	MF	GER	Tim Rieder
7	FW	GER	Julian Guttau
8	MF	NAM	Manfred Starke
9	FW	NED	Joël Zwarts
10	FW	KOS	Albion Vrenezi
11	MF	GER	Fabian Greilinger
12	GK	FIN	Julius Schmid
14	FW	GER	Abdenego Nankishi (on loan from Werder Bremen)
15	GK	GER	David Richter
16	DF	ITA	Max Reinthaler
17	FW	GER	Morris Schröter

No.	Pos.	Nation	Player
18	MF	GER	Tim Kloss
19	FW	GER	Fynn Lakenmacher
21	DF	GER	Leroy Kwadwo
22	FW	KOS	Valmir Sulejmani
23	MF	GER	Devin Sür
27	FW	USA	Mansour Ouro-Tagba
29	DF	GER	Kilian Ludewig (on loan from Red Bull Salzburg)
30	MF	GER	Miloš Ćoćić
31	MF	GER	Niklas Tarnat
32	MF	GER	Moritz Bangerter
35	DF	AUT	Michael Glück
36	DF	GER	Phillipp Steinhart
37	MF	GER	Marlon Frey
38	FW	GER	Serhat-Semih Güler
39	FW	GER	Eliot Muteba]

=== Out on loan ===
Note: Flags indicate national team as defined under FIFA eligibility rules; some limited exceptions apply. Players may hold more than one non-FIFA nationality.

No.	Pos.	Nation	Player
—	DF	GER	Niklas Lang (at Freiburg II until 30 June 2024)

== Transfers ==
Transferred in
Pos.	Name	Age	EU	Moving from	Type	Transfer Window	Ref.
Midfielder	Julian Guttau	23	Yes	SC Freiburg II	Transfer	Summer	
Midfielder	Marlon Frey	27	Yes	MSV Duisburg	Transfer	Summer	
Goalkeeper	David Richter	24	Yes	Kickers Offenbach	Transfer	Summer	
Midfielder	Lorenz Knöferl	20	Yes	Carl Zeiss Jena	Loan return	Summer	
Defender	Michael Glück	20	Yes	Hessen Kassel	Loan return	Summer	
Midfielder	Eroll Zejnullahu	28		SpVgg Bayreuth	Transfer	Summer	
Forward	Tarsis Bonga	26	Yes	Eintracht Braunschweig	Transfer	Summer	
Midfielder	Manfred Starke	32	No	VfB Oldenburg	Transfer	Summer	
Defender	Kaan Kurt	21	Yes	Borussia Mönchengladbach II	End of contract	Summer	
Defender	Kilian Ludewig	23	Yes	Red Bull Salzburg	Loan	Summer	
Forward	Valmir Sulejmani	27	Yes	FC Ingolstadt 04	End of contract	Summer	
Midfielder	Morris Schröter	27	Yes	Hansa Rostock	Transfer	Summer	
Midfielder	Niklas Tarnat	25	Yes	Free agent	End of contract	Summer	
Defender	Leroy Kwadwo	26	Yes	MSV Duisburg	Transfer	Summer	
Forward	Joël Zwarts	24	Yes	Jahn Regensburg	Transfer	Summer	

Transferred out
Pos.	Name	Age	EU	Moving to	Type	Transfer Window	Ref.
Midfielder	Marius Wörl	19	Yes	Hannover 96	Transfer	Summer	
Midfielder	Raphael Holzhauser	30	Yes	OH Leuven	Loan return	Summer	
Midfielder	Nathan Wicht	19	—	Free agent	Contract terminated	Summer	
Midfielder	Martin Kobylanski	29	Yes	Free agent	Contract terminated	Summer	
Defender	Leandro Morgalla	18	Yes	FC Liefering	Transfer	Summer	
Goalkeeper	Tom Kretzschmar	24	Yes	FC 08 Homburg	Transfer	Summer	
Midfielder	Erik Tallig	23	Yes	Free agent	End of contract	Summer	
Defender	Christopher Lannert	25	Yes	Arminia Bielefeld	Transfer	Summer	
Forward	Meris Skenderović	25	Yes	Free agent	Contract terminated	Summer	

=== Released ===
Date	Position	Nationality	Name	Joined	Date	Ref
18 May 2024	GK	(Germany)	Julius Schmid	Türkgücü München		
18 May 2024	DF	(Germany)	Kaan Kurt	Holstein Kiel		
18 May 2024	MF	(Germany)	Phillipp Steinhart	08 Homburg		
18 May 2024	MF	(Germany)	Devin Sür	Karlsruher SC II		
18 May 2024	MF	(Germany)	Niklas Tarnat	SGV Freiberg		
18 May 2024	MF	(Kosovo)	Albion Vrenezi	Viktoria Köln		
18 May 2024	MF	(Kosovo)	Eroll Zejnullahu	SpVgg Bayreuth		
18 May 2024	MF	(Namibia)	Manfred Starke			
18 May 2024	FW	(Germany)	Fynn Lakenmacher	Darmstadt 98		
18 May 2024	FW	(Serbia)	Miloš Ćoćić	FV Illertissen		
18 May 2024	FW	(Togo)	Mansour Ouro-Tagba	FC Köln		
19 June 2024	MF	(Kosovo)	Valmir Sulejmani	Hannover 96 II	1 February 2025	
19 June 2024	MF	(Germany)	Tim Rieder	PAS Giannina		
21 June 2024	FW	(Germany)	Serhat-Semih Güler	Viktoria Köln		

== Friendlies ==
25 June 2023	TSV 1880 Wasserburg	0–0	1860 Munich	Wasserburg am Inn
16:00 CEST (UTC+2)		Report		Stadium: Badria Stadion; Attendance: 2,300; Referee: Benedikt Jany

28 June 2023	Tittling	0–12	1860 Munich	Tittling
17:00 CEST (UTC+2)		Report	Guttau 4'; Bonga 6', 32'; Glück 13'; Steinhart 19'; Zejnullahu 25', 29'; Vrenezi 43'; Starke 49'; Skenderović 54' (pen.), 69'; Ouro-Tagba 86'	Stadium: Tittling Sports Ground; Attendance: 1,000; Referee: Lukas Penzkofer

30 June 2023	1860 Munich	0–3	SV Ried	Windischgarsten
17:00 CEST (UTC+2)		Report	Große 19'; Gragger 57'; Wiesinger 61'	Stadium: DANA Arena Windischgarsten; Attendance: 400; Referee: Andreas Feichtinger

4 July 2023	1860 Munich	0–2	LASK	Windischgarsten
17:00 CEST (UTC+2)		Report	Goiginger 41'; Michorl 87'	Stadium: DANA Arena Windischgarsten; Attendance: 600; Referee: Achim Untergasser

9 July 2023	Memmingen	0–4	1860 Munich	Memmingen
15:00 CEST (UTC+2)		Report	Guttau 3'; Ouro-Tagba 47'; Bonga 76'; Ćoćić 87'	Stadium: Memminger Arena; Attendance: 3,815; Referee: Elias Tiedeken

22 July 2023	1860 Munich	0–3	1. FC Nürnberg	Unterhaching
16:45 CEST (UTC+2)		Report	Daferner 6', 22'; Lohkemper 32'	Stadium: Sportpark Unterhaching; Attendance: 2,400; Referee: Felix Brych

22 July 2023	SpVgg Unterhaching	1–0	1860 Munich	Unterhaching
18:00 CEST (UTC+2)	Hobsch 48'; Schwabl (yellow card); Schifferl (yellow card)	Report	Zejnullahu (yellow card); Frey (yellow card)	Stadium: Sportpark Unterhaching; Attendance: 2,400; Referee: Tobias Schultes

29 July 2023	1860 Munich	1–2	1. FC Nürnberg	Kirchheim bei München
15:00 CEST (UTC+2)	Starke 16' (yellow card); Lang (yellow card)	Report	Ranos 5'; Fukuda 33'	Stadium: Sportpark Heimstetten; Attendance: 2,500; Referee: Wolfgang Haslberger

29 July 2023	VfB Stuttgart	2–0	1860 Munich	Kirchheim bei München
17:30 CEST (UTC+2)	Milošević 9'; Haraguchi 25'	Report		Stadium: Sportpark Heimstetten; Attendance: 2,500; Referee: Wolfgang Haslberger

== Competitions ==
=== Overall record ===
Competition	First match	Last match	Starting round	Final position	Record							
Competition	First match	Last match	Starting round	Final position	Pld	W	D	L	GF	GA	GD	Win %
3. Liga	2 August 2024	18 May 2024	Matchday 1	15th	38	13	7	18	40	42	−2	34.21
Bavarian Cup	2 August 2023	18 November 2023	First Round	Quarter-finals	4	3	0	1	19	2	+17	75.00
Total					42	16	7	19	59	44	+15	38.10

Last updated: 18 May 2024
Source: Competitions

=== 3. Liga ===
==== League table ====
Pos	Team	Pld	W	D	L	GF	GA	GD	Pts	Promotion, qualification or relegation
13	Viktoria Köln	38	13	10	15	59	65	−6	49	
14	Arminia Bielefeld	38	11	13	14	48	47	+1	46	
15	1860 Munich	38	13	7	18	40	42	−2	46	
16	Waldhof Mannheim	38	11	10	17	51	60	−9	43	
17	Hallescher FC (R)	38	11	7	20	50	68	−18	40	Relegation to Regionalliga

Source: DFB
Rules for classification: 1) Points; 2) Goal difference; 3) Goals scored; 4) Head-to-head results; 5) Head-to-head away goals scored; 6) Away goals scored; 7) Play-off.
(R) Relegated

==== Results summary ====
Overall								Home						Away					
Pld	W	D	L	GF	GA	GD	Pts	W	D	L	GF	GA	GD	W	D	L	GF	GA	GD
0	0	0	0	0	0	0	0	0	0	0	0	0	0	0	0	0	0	0	0

Last updated: 18 May 2024.
Source: DFB

==== Results by round ====
Round	1
Ground	
Result	
Position	

Updated to match(es) played on 18 May 2024. Source: DFB
A = Away; H = Home; W = Win; D = Draw; L = Loss

==== Matches ====
5 August 2023 1	1860 Munich	2–0	Waldhof Mannheim	Munich
14:00 CEST (UTC+2)	Starke 12'; Vrenezi 51'; Tarnat (yellow card) 52'; Lakenmacher 56' (yellow card) 90+4'	Report	Karbstein (yellow card) 53'; Wagner (yellow card) 88'	Stadium: Grünwalder Stadion; Attendance: 15,000; Referee: Tom Bauer

19 August 2023 2	MSV Duisburg	0–3	1860 Munich	Duisburg
14:00 CET (UTC+1)	Esswein (yellow card) 19'; Müller (yellow card) 45+3'; Ziegner (yellow card) 62'; Müller (yellow card) 78'; Bakir (yellow card) 83'; Feltscher (yellow card) 86'	Report	Verlaat (yellow card) 8'; Starke 32'; Zwarts 54', 86'; Guttau (yellow card) 56'	Stadium: MSV-Arena; Attendance: 14,142; Referee: Martin Petersen

22 August 2023 3	1860 Munich	1–2	VfB Lübeck	Munich
19:00 CEST (UTC+2)	Guttau 11'; Vrenezi (yellow card) 14'; Tarnat (yellow card) 69'; Greilinger (yellow card) 85'	Report	Sommer (yellow card) 4'; Sternberg (yellow card) 10'; Greilinger 25' (o.g.); Schneider (yellow card) 27'; Gözüsirin 31'; Akono (yellow card) 35'; Reddemann (yellow card) 48'; Klewin (yellow card) 50'	Stadium: Grünwalder Stadion; Attendance: 15,000; Referee: Alexander Sather

26 August 2023 4	SV Sandhausen	3–0	1860 Munich	Sandhausen
16:30 CEST (UTC+2)	Schuster 4'; Ehlich 45'; Rehnen (yellow card) 72'; Knipping (yellow card) 79'; Stolze 87'	Report	Kwadwo (yellow card) 90+2'	Stadium: GP Stadion am Hardtwald; Attendance: 5,848; Referee: Harm Osmers

2 September 2023 5	1860 Munich	1–2	Erzgebirge Aue	Munich
16:30 CEST (UTC+2)	Lang (yellow card) 51'; Zwarts 54'; Tarnat (yellow card) 64'	Report	Jakob (yellow card) 18'; Bär 85'; Thiel 87'	Stadium: Grünwalder Stadion; Attendance: 15,000; Referee: Eric Weisbach

16 September 2023 6	Ingolstadt 04	2–1	1860 Munich	Ingolstadt
16:30 CEST (UTC+2)	Malone (yellow card) 18'; Schröck (yellow card) 21'; Deichmann (yellow card) 36'; Kopacz (yellow card) 48' (goal) 77'; Mause 58' (yellow card) 90+8'	Report	Guttau 23' (yellow card) 59'; Frey (yellow card) 38'; Zejnullahu (yellow card) 76'	Stadium: Audi Sportpark; Attendance: 12,965; Referee: Dr. Florian Exner

23 September 2023 7	Hallescher FC	0–2	1860 Munich	Halle
16:30 CEST (UTC+2)	Gayret (yellow card) 47'	Report	Schröter 23'; Lang (yellow card) 48'; Guttau 66'; Hiller (yellow card) 72'; Kwadwo (yellow card) 83'; Starke (red card) 87'	Stadium: Leuna-Chemie-Stadion; Attendance: 9,427; Referee: Martin Speckner

30 September 2023 8	1860 Munich	1–0	SC Verl	Munich
14:00 CEST (UTC+2)	Paetow 40'; Lang (yellow card) 45+2'; Kwadwo (yellow card) 66'; Lakenmacher (yellow card) 77'; Vrenezi (yellow card) 90+4'	Report	Ochojski (yellow card) 32'; Kammerbauer (yellow card) 49'; Pernot (yellow card) 55'	Stadium: Grünwalder Stadion; Attendance: 15,000; Referee: Jarno Wienefeld

3 October 2023 9	SSV Ulm 1846	1–0	1860 Munich	Ulm
19:00 CEST (UTC+2)	Allgeier 9'; Reichert (yellow card) 27'; Rösch (yellow card) 44'	Report	Lang (yellow card) 3'; Guttau (yellow card) 11'; Vrenezi (yellow card) 30'; Verlaat (yellow card) 80'	Stadium: Donaustadion; Attendance: 17,000; Referee: Lars Erbst

7 October 2023 10	1860 Munich	0–0	Dynamo Dresden	Munich
14:00 CEST (UTC+2)	Verlaat (yellow card) 36'; Tarnat (yellow card) 49'; Sulejmani (yellow card) 90+1'	Report	Bünning (yellow card) 11'; Schäffler (yellow card) 82'; Zimmerschied (yellow card) 89'; Herrmann (yellow card) 90+1'	Stadium: Grünwalder Stadion; Attendance: 15,000; Referee: Robert Hartmann

15 October 2023 11	Preußen Münster	1–1	1860 Munich	Münster
16:30 CEST (UTC+2)	Mrowca (yellow card) 79'; Scherder (yellow card) 80' (goal) 87'	Report	Tarnat (yellow card) 14'; Sulejmani (yellow card) 31'; Rieder (yellow card) 43'; Zwarts 54'	Stadium: Preußenstadion; Attendance: 11,418; Referee: Dr. Robin Braun

21 October 2023 12	1860 Munich	2–0	SC Freiburg II	Munich
14:00 CEST (UTC+2)	Kurt (yellow card) 5'; Kwadwo 16'; Zejnullahu 48'	Report	Rüdlin (yellow card) 54'	Stadium: Grünwalder Stadion; Attendance: 15,000; Referee: Fabienne Michel

28 October 2023 13	Viktoria Köln	2–1	1860 Munich	Cologne
14:00 CEST (UTC+2)	Marseiler (yellow card) 23' (goal) 41' (pen.); Philipp (yellow card) 37'; Schultz (yellow card) 45+1' (goal) 90+2'	Report	Schröter (yellow card) 3' (yellow-red card) 82' (goal) 42'; Rieder (yellow card) 45+1'; Kurt (yellow card) 45+1'; Verlaat (yellow card) 58'; Lang (yellow card) 61'; Kwadwo (red card) 79'; Glück (yellow card) 90'; Tarnat (yellow card) 90+5'	Stadium: Sportpark Höhenberg; Attendance: 4,863; Referee: Timon Schulz

4 November 2023 14	1860 Munich	0–1	Jahn Regensburg	Munich
14:00 CET (UTC+1)	Greilinger (yellow card) 21'; Vrenezi (yellow card) 51'; Zejnullahu (yellow card) 51'	Report	Geipl (yellow card) 69'; Eisenhuth 90+2'	Stadium: Grünwalder Stadion; Attendance: 15,000; Referee: Nicolas Winter

11 November 2023 15	1. FC Saarbrücken	2–3	1860 Munich	Saarbrücken
14:00 CET (UTC+1)	Zeitz (yellow card) 26' (goal) 39'; Naïfi 41'; Gaus (yellow card) 63'; Rabihic (yellow card) 81'	Report	Schröter 4', 16'; Lang (yellow card) 76' (goal) 82'; Rieder (yellow card) 90+2'	Stadium: Ludwigsparkstadion; Attendance: 11,394; Referee: Lars Erbst

25 November 2023 16	1860 Munich	0–1	SpVgg Unterhaching	Munich
14:00 CET (UTC+1)	Kwadwo (yellow card) 6'; Glück (yellow card) 35' (yellow-red card) 64'	Report	Waidner (yellow card) 16'; Fetsch 21'; Stiefler (yellow card) 48'; Welzmüller (yellow card) 75'; Schmid (yellow card) 80'	Stadium: Grünwalder Stadion; Attendance: 15,000; Referee: Timo Gansloweit

3 December 2024 17	Borussia Dortmund II	3–0	1860 Munich	Dortmund
19:30 CET (UTC+1)	Pohlmann 63'; Hettwer 78'; Azhil 81'; Elongo-Yombo (yellow card) 90+3'	Report	Kwadwo (yellow card) 24'; Lang (yellow card) 90+3'	Stadium: Stadion Rote Erde; Attendance: 1,833; Referee: Daniel Bartnitzki

17 December 2023 19	Arminia Bielefeld	2–0	1860 Munich	Bielefeld
16:30 CET (UTC+1)	Biankadi 12'; Klos 24'; Großer (red card) 64'; Schreck (yellow card) 79'	Report	Starke (yellow card) 59'; Rieder (yellow card) 78'	Stadium: SchücoArena; Attendance: 17,685; Referee: Daniel Schlager

20 December 2023 20	Waldhof Mannheim	1–0	1860 Munich	Mannheim
19:00 CET (UTC+1)	Rieckmann (yellow card) 18'; Bahn 68' (pen.); Carls (yellow card) 82'	Report	Steinhart (yellow card) 51'; Glück (yellow card) 76'	Stadium: Carl-Benz-Stadion; Attendance: 10,086; Referee: Konrad Oldhafer

20 January 2024 21	1860 Munich	4–1	MSV Duisburg	Munich
16:30 CET (UTC+1)	Guttau 15'; Schröter 23', 53'; Lakenmacher 58'	Report	Bakir 72'; Michelbrink (yellow card) 84'	Stadium: Grünwalder Stadion; Attendance: 15,000; Referee: Eric Weisbach

23 January 2024 22	VfB Lübeck	1–1	1860 Munich	Lübeck
19:00 CET (UTC+1)	Löhden (yellow card) 26'; Velasco (yellow card) 65'; Boland 88'	Report	Sulejmani (yellow card) 11'; Steinhart (yellow card) 23'; Ouro-Tagba 79'	Stadium: Stadion Lohmühle; Attendance: 6,183; Referee: Lukas Benen

28 January 2024 23	1860 Munich	1–1	SV Sandhausen	Munich
16:30 CET (UTC+1)	Frey (yellow card) 37'; Greilinger (yellow card) 43'; Kwadwo 67' (yellow card) 90+2'; Ouro-Tagba (yellow card) 83'; Verlaat (yellow card) 85'	Report	Meier 20'; Stolze (yellow card) 65'; Diekmeier (yellow card) 80'; Zander (yellow card) 90+2'	Stadium: Grünwalder Stadion; Attendance: 15,000; Referee: Marc Philip Eckermann

3 February 2024 24	Erzgebirge Aue	0–0	1860 Munich	Aue
14:00 CET (UTC+1)	Sijarić (yellow card) 45+1'	Report	Lakenmacher (yellow card) 11'; Ludewig (yellow card) 39'; Kwadwo (yellow card) 66'; Steinhart (red card) 86'; Nankishi (yellow card) 90+2'; Glück (yellow card) 90+5'	Stadium: Erzgebirgsstadion; Attendance: 8,889; Referee: Leonidas Exuzidis

6 February 2024 18	1860 Munich	2–0	Rot-Weiss Essen	Munich
19:00 CET (UTC+1)	Lakenmacher 33'; Guttau 47'; Kwadwo (yellow card) 77'; Glück (yellow card) 85'	Report	Doumbouya (yellow card) 66'; Brumme (yellow card) 73'	Stadium: Grünwalder Stadion; Attendance: 15,000; Referee: Nico Fuchs

11 February 2024 25	1860 Munich	3–1	Ingolstadt 04	Munich
16:30 CET (UTC+1)	Lakenmacher 15'; Funk 58' (o.g.); Vrenezi (yellow card) 70'; Hiller (yellow card) 83' Ouro-Tagba 90+1'	Report	Fröde (yellow card) 63'; Mause 71' (pen.); Kopacz (yellow card) 73'; Dittgen (yellow card) 78'; Costly (yellow card) 90+4'	Stadium: Grünwalder Stadion; Attendance: 15,000; Referee: Dr. Robin Braun

18 February 2024 26	1860 Munich	1–0	Hallescher FC	Munich
19:30 CET (UTC+1)	Guttau 17'; Greilinger (yellow card) 89'	Report	Lofolomo (yellow card) 28'; Halimi (yellow card) 90+2'	Stadium: Grünwalder Stadion; Attendance: 15,000; Referee: Felix Bickel

24 February 2024 27	SC Verl	0–1	1860 Munich	Verl
16:30 CET (UTC+1)	Sessa (yellow card) 25'; Lokotsch (yellow card) 83'	Report	Frey (yellow card) 42'; Guttau 71'	Stadium: Sportclub Arena; Attendance: 2,915; Referee: Cristian Ballweg

2 March 2024 28	1860 Munich	0–1	SSV Ulm 1846	Munich
14:00 CET (UTC+1)	Kurt (yellow card) 10'; Nankishi (yellow card) 23'; Frey (red card) 65'	Report	Rösch (yellow card) 30'; Thiele (yellow card) 65'; Strompf (yellow card) 72'; Jann (yellow card) 87'; Röser 90+3'; Maier (yellow card) 90+5'	Stadium: Grünwalder Stadion; Attendance: 15,000; Referee: Tom Bauer

8 March 2024 29	Dynamo Dresden	2–1	1860 Munich	Dresden
19:00 CET (UTC+1)	Kutschke 8'; Cueto 76'; Hauptmann (yellow card) 79'	Report	Nankishi (yellow card) 5' (goal) 41'; Ouro-Tagba (yellow card) 78'	Stadium: Rudolf-Harbig-Stadion; Attendance: 31,049; Referee: Dr. Max Burda

16 March 2024 30	1860 Munich	1–2	Preußen Münster	Munich
14:00 CET (UTC+1)	Zwarts 56'; Glück (yellow card) 82'	Report	Bazzoli (yellow card) 23'; Grodowski 45+2'; Bouchama 69'; Schad (yellow card) 75'; Hahn (yellow card) 86'	Stadium: Grünwalder Stadion; Attendance: 15,000; Referee: Nico Fuchs

30 March 2024 31	SC Freiburg II	1–0	1860 Munich	Freiburg im Breisgau
16:30 CEST (UTC+2)	Lang (yellow card) 11'; Marino 71'; Fahrner (yellow card) 80'	Report	Rieder (yellow card) 14'; Verlaat (yellow card) 84'	Stadium: Dreisamstadion; Attendance: 4,004; Referee: Luca Jürgensen

6 April 2024 32	1860 Munich	3–1	Viktoria Köln	Munich
14:00 CEST (UTC+2)	Zwarts 16'; Engelhardt 35' (o.g.); Verlaat 71'	Report	Marseiler (yellow card) 49'; Lorch 50'; Engelhardt (yellow card) 55'	Stadium: Grünwalder Stadion; Attendance: 15,000; Referee: Felix Prigan

14 April 2024 33	Jahn Regensburg	1–1	1860 Munich	Regensburg
13:30 CEST (UTC+2)	Geipl (yellow card) 43'; Ziegele (yellow card) 51'; Huth 81'; Viet (yellow card) 89'	Report	Glück (yellow card) 49'; Schröter 53'; Rieder (yellow card) 89'	Stadium: Jahnstadion Regensburg; Attendance: 15,210; Referee: Sören Storks

20 April 2024 34	1860 Munich	1–1	1. FC Saarbrücken	Munich
14:00 CEST (UTC+2)	Verlaat (yellow card) 10'; Kwadwo (red card) 44'; Kloss 84'	Report	Brünker 9'; Rizzuto (yellow card) 23'; Sontheimer (yellow card) 56'; Gaus (yellow card) 68'	Stadium: Grünwalder Stadion; Attendance: 15,000; Referee: Fabienne Michel

28 April 2024 35	SpVgg Unterhaching	2–0	1860 Munich	Unterhaching
19:30 CEST (UTC+2)	Stiefler 31' (yellow card) 90'; Hobsch 54'; Schwabl (yellow card) 71'; Welzmüller (yellow card) 75'; Skarlatidis (yellow card) 77'	Report	Ouro-Tagba (yellow card) 90+4'	Stadium: Uhlsport Park; Attendance: 14,250; Referee: Patrick Alt

4 May 2024 36	1860 Munich	1–2	Borussia Dortmund II	Munich
14:00 CEST (UTC+2)	Reinthaler (yellow card) 5'; Ouro-Tagba 28'; Lakenmacher (yellow card) 57'; Greilinger (yellow card) 84'	Report	Pohlmann 4', 50'	Stadium: Grünwalder Stadion; Attendance: 15,000; Referee: Felix Weller

10 May 2024 37	Rot-Weiss Essen	0–1	1860 Munich	Essen
19:00 CEST (UTC+2)	Vonic (yellow card) 64'; Götze (yellow card) 79'; Eisfeld (yellow card) 79'	Report	Lakenmacher 24'; Ouro-Tagba (yellow card) 58'; Guttau (yellow card) 71'; Schröter (yellow card) 84'; Hiller (yellow card) 89'	Stadium: Stadion an der Hafenstraße; Attendance: 18,647; Referee: Alexander Sather

18 May 2024 38	1860 Munich	0–2	Arminia Bielefeld	Munich
13:30 CEST (UTC+2)		Report	Momuluh 7'; Klos (yellow card) 54'; Biankadi 60'	Stadium: Grünwalder Stadion; Attendance: 15,000; Referee: Felix Prigan

=== Bavarian Cup ===
2 August 2023 First Round	1. FC Stockheim	1–5	1860 Munich	Stockheim
18:30 CEST (UTC+2)	Wittmann (yellow card) 8'; Schubart 45'; Lindner (yellow card) 83'	Report	Lakenmacher 23'; Zejnullahu 38'; Kwadwo (yellow card) 42' (yellow-red card) 44'; Ludewig (yellow card) 55'; Frey 58', 88'; Sulejmani 81'	Stadium: Stockheim Sports Complex; Attendance: 3,000; Referee: Daniel Reich

15 August 2023 Second Round	TSV Aindling	0–6	1860 Munich	Aindling
17:00 CEST (UTC+2)		Report	Lang 16'; Ćoćić 17', 88'; Sulejmani 31', 53'; Zejnullahu 43'	Stadium: TSV Aindling Stadium; Attendance: 4,000; Referee: Felix Wagner

5 September 2023 Third Round	DJK Hain	0–8	1860 Munich	Laufach
CEST (UTC+2)	Müller (yellow card) 23'; Jashari (yellow card) 70'	Report	Lakenmacher 3', 42'; Bonga 14', 44', 45', 71' (pen.); Frey 40'; Ćoćić 53'	Stadium: Seebachtal Laufach sports area Attendance: 1,860; Referee: Maximilian Ziegler

18 November 2023 Quarter-finals	Pipinsried	1–0	1860 Munich	Altomünster
13:42 CEST (UTC+2)	Gerstmayer 4'; Kessler (yellow card) 40'; Robber (red card) 65'; Retzer (yellow card) 77'	Report	Frey (yellow card) 37'	Stadium: Küchenstadel Arena; Attendance: 2,500; Referee: Assad Nouhoum

== Squad statistics ==
=== Appearances and goals ===
As of match played 18 May 2024

Players with no appearances are not included on the list
Italics indicate a loaned in player

No.	Pos	Nat	Player	Total		3. Liga		Bavarian Cup	
No.	Pos	Nat	Player	Apps	Goals	Apps	Goals	Apps	Goals
1	GK	(Germany) GER	Marco Hiller	28	0	27	0	1	0
2	DF	(Germany) GER	Kaan Kurt	16	0	11+2	0	2+1	0
4	DF	(Netherlands) NED	Jesper Verlaat	37	1	36	1	1	0
5	MF	(Kosovo) KOS	Eroll Zejnullahu	24	3	14+7	1	3	2
6	MF	(Germany) GER	Tim Rieder	31	0	29+2	0	0	0
7	FW	(Germany) GER	Julian Guttau	34	7	31+3	7	0	0
8	MF	(Namibia) NAM	Manfred Starke	26	1	18+7	1	0+1	0
9	FW	(Netherlands) NED	Joël Zwarts	22	6	14+7	6	1	0
10	MF	(Kosovo) KOS	Albion Vrenezi	29	0	12+16	0	1	0
11	MF	(Germany) GER	Fabian Greilinger	34	0	22+8	0	1+3	0
12	GK	(Finland) FIN	Julius Schmid	1	0	0	0	1	0
13	MF	(Germany) GER	Tarsis Bonga	11	4	0+7	0	4	4
14	FW	(Germany) GER	Abdenego Nankishi	11	1	6+5	1	0	0
15	GK	(Germany) GER	David Richter	13	0	11	0	2	0
16	DF	(Italy) ITA	Max Reinthaler	7	0	6+1	0	0	0
17	MF	(Germany) GER	Morris Schröter	33	7	33	7	0	0
18	MF	(Germany) GER	Tim Kloss	6	1	0+4	1	1+1	0
19	FW	(Germany) GER	Fynn Lakenmacher	39	8	23+12	5	2+2	3
20	DF	(Germany) GER	Lukas Reich	4	0	2+2	0	0	0
21	DF	(Germany) GER	Leroy Kwadwo	35	2	28+4	2	3	0
22	FW	(Kosovo) KOS	Valmir Sulejmani	17	3	5+8	0	3+1	3
23	MF	(Germany) GER	Devin Sür	3	0	0	0	1+2	0
25	MF	(Bosnia and Herzegovina) BIH	Damjan Dordan	1	0	0	0	0+1	0
27	FW	(United States) USA	Mansour Ouro-Tagba	22	3	6+13	3	2+1	0
29	DF	(Germany) GER	Kilian Ludewig	28	0	18+6	0	3+1	0
30	MF	(Serbia) SRB	Miloš Ćoćić	7	3	0+3	0	2+2	3
31	MF	(Germany) GER	Niklas Tarnat	16	0	11+1	0	2+2	0
32	MF	(Germany) GER	Moritz Bangerter	3	0	2+1	0	0	0
35	DF	(Austria) AUT	Michael Glück	27	0	18+7	0	2	0
36	DF	(Germany) GER	Phillipp Steinhart	14	0	6+7	0	1	0
37	MF	(Germany) GER	Marlon Frey	32	3	16+12	0	4	3
38	FW	(Germany) GER	Serhat-Semih Güler	7	0	0+7	0	0	0
39	FW	(Germany) GER	Eliot Muteba	6	0	4+2	0	0	0
Players away on loan:
3	DF	(Germany) GER	Niklas Lang	16	2	9+5	1	1+1	1
Players who featured but departed the club permanently during the season:

=== Goal scorers ===
As of match played 18 May 2024

Place	Position	Nation	Number	Name	3. Liga	Bavarian Cup	Total
1	FW	(Germany)	19	Fynn Lakenmacher	5	3	8
2	MF	(Germany)	17	Morris Schröter	7	0	7
2	FW	(Germany)	7	Julian Guttau	7	0	7
4	FW	(Netherlands)	9	Joël Zwarts	6	0	6
5	MF	(Germany)	13	Tarsis Bonga	0	4	4
5				Own goal	4	0	4
7	FW	(United States)	27	Mansour Ouro-Tagba	3	0	3
7	FW	(Kosovo)	22	Valmir Sulejmani	0	3	3
7	MF	(Germany)	37	Marlon Frey	0	3	3
7	MF	(Serbia)	30	Miloš Ćoćić	0	3	3
7	MF	(Kosovo)	5	Eroll Zejnullahu	1	2	3
12	DF	(Germany)	21	Leroy Kwadwo	2	0	2
12	DF	(Germany)	3	Niklas Lang	1	1	2
14	DF	(Netherlands)	4	Jesper Verlaat	1	0	1
14	MF	(Namibia)	8	Manfred Starke	1	0	1
14	MF	(Germany)	18	Tim Kloss	1	0	1
14	FW	(Germany)	14	Abdenego Nankishi	1	0	1
Total					40	19	59

=== Clean sheets ===
As of match played 18 May 2024

Place	Position	Nation	Number	Name	3. Liga	Bavarian Cup	Total
1	GK	(Germany)	1	Marco Hiller	9	0	9
2	GK	(Germany)	15	David Richter	2	2	4
Total					11	2	13

=== Disciplinary record ===
As of match played 18 May 2024

Number	Nation	Position	Name	3. Liga		Bavarian Cup		Total	
Number	Nation	Position	Name	Booked	Sent off (straight red)	Booked	Sent off (straight red)	Booked	Sent off (straight red)
1	(Germany)	GK	Marco Hiller	3	0	0	0	3	0
2	(Germany)	DF	Kaan Kurt	3	0	0	0	3	0
4	(Netherlands)	DF	Jesper Verlaat	7	0	0	0	7	0
5	(Kosovo)	MF	Eroll Zejnullahu	2	0	0	0	2	0
6	(Germany)	MF	Tim Rieder	6	0	0	0	6	0
7	(Germany)	FW	Julian Guttau	4	0	0	0	4	0
8	(Namibia)	MF	Manfred Starke	1	1	0	0	1	1
10	(Kosovo)	MF	Albion Vrenezi	7	0	0	0	7	0
11	(Germany)	MF	Fabian Greilinger	5	0	0	0	5	0
14	(Germany)	FW	Abdenego Nankishi	3	0	0	0	3	0
16	(Italy)	DF	Max Reinthaler	1	0	0	0	1	0
17	(Germany)	MF	Morris Schröter	3	1	0	0	3	1
19	(Germany)	FW	Fynn Lakenmacher	4	0	0	0	4	0
21	(Germany)	DF	Leroy Kwadwo	8	2	2	1	10	3
22	(Kosovo)	FW	Valmir Sulejmani	3	0	0	0	3	0
27	(United States)	FW	Mansour Ouro-Tagba	4	0	0	0	4	0
29	(Germany)	DF	Kilian Ludewig	1	0	1	0	2	0
31	(Germany)	MF	Niklas Tarnat	6	0	0	0	6	0
35	(Austria)	DF	Michael Glück	8	1	0	0	8	1
36	(Germany)	DF	Phillipp Steinhart	2	1	0	0	2	1
37	(Germany)	MF	Marlon Frey	3	1	1	0	4	1
Players away on loan:
3	(Germany)	DF	Niklas Lang	7	0	0	0	7	0
Players who left 1860 Munich during the season:
Total				91	7	4	1	95	8
