= Worle (surname) =

Worle is a surname. Notable people with the surname include:

- Kathrin Wörle-Scheller (born 1984), German tennis player
- Len Worle (1889–1948), Australian rules footballer
- Tanja Wörle (born 1980), German footballer
- Tommy Worle (1885-1917), Australian rules footballer
- Thomas Wörle (born 1992), German footballer
