= Alekzandar-Boris Sinabov =

Bulgarian footballer (born 2003)

Personal information
- Date of birth: 7 March 2003 (age 23)
- Place of birth: Ruse, Bulgaria
- Height: 1.92 m (6 ft 4 in)
- Position: Forward

Team information
- Current team: FC Kufstein
- Number: 7

Youth career
- Ariston Ruse
- TSV Milbertshofen
- FC Deisenhofen

Senior career*
Years	Team	Apps	(Gls)
2021–2022	VfR Garching	20	(6)
2021	VfR Garching II	2	(0)
2022–	TSV Buchbach II	18	(14)
2022–	TSV Buchbach	5	(0)
2023–	FC Kufstein	2	(0)

International career
2021	Bulgaria U19	1	(0)
- * Club domestic league appearances and goals as of 23:04, 19 April 2023 (UTC)

Alekzandar-Boris Sinabov (Bulgarian: Алекзандър-Борис Синабов; born 7 March 2003) is a Bulgarian professional footballer who plays as a forward for FC Kufstein.

== Club career ==
Born in Ruse, Bulgaria, Sinabov first took an interest in football at the age of six or seven, before joining local side Ariston Ruse, the team his father, Nikolay, had formed. In 2016, he won an individual award for his performances as his side finished second to Botev Plovdiv, and was presented the award by former Bulgarian footballer Dimitar Berbatov. He moved to Germany in 2017, at the age of fourteen, initially playing for TSV Milbertshofen, before moving to FC Deisenhofen.

In 2021, he was chosen as one of fifteen players from around the world to join the FC Bayern Munich World Squad initiative - a squad to represent the Bavarian club in international friendlies. While with the World Squad, he scored six goals in friendlies, including against Mexican opposition Club América.

On his return to club football, he joined VfR Garching for the 2021–22 season. Having scored six goals in twenty league appearances for Garching, he transferred to Regionalliga side TSV Buchbach the following year.

== International career ==
Sinabov was called up to the Bulgarian under-19 side in early 2021, playing in a friendly against Moldova.

== Personal life ==
His brother, Albert, is also a footballer, and currently plays for FC Augsburg, having previously been in the academy of TSV 1860 Munich.

== Career statistics ==
=== Club ===
As of 19 April 2023

Appearances and goals by club, season and competition
Club	Season	League			Cup		Other		Total	
Club	Season	Division	Apps	Goals	Apps	Goals	Apps	Goals	Apps	Goals
VfR Garching	2021–22	Bayernliga	20	6	0	0	0	0	20	6
VfR Garching II	2021–22	Kreisklasse	2	0	–		0	0	2	0
TSV Buchbach II	2022–23	Bezirksliga Oberbayern-Ost	13	9	–		0	0	13	9
TSV Buchbach	2022–23	Regionalliga Bayern	5	0	0	0	2 (Note: Appearances in the Bavarian Cup)	0	7	0
Career total			40	15	0	0	2	0	42	15
