= Michael Glück =

Austrian footballer (born 2003)

Personal information
- Full name: Michael Harald Glück
- Date of birth: 13 June 2003 (age 23)
- Place of birth: Salzburg, Austria
- Height: 1.89 m (6 ft 2 in)
- Position: Defender

Team information
- Current team: VfB Stuttgart II
- Number: 4

Youth career
- 2010–2011: Union Ostermiething
- 2011–2018: Wacker Burghausen
- 2018–2021: 1860 Munich

Senior career*
Years	Team	Apps	(Gls)
2021–2023	1860 Munich II	20	(0)
2022–2024	1860 Munich	26	(0)
2022–2023	→ Hessen Kassel (loan)	15	(0)
2024–	VfB Stuttgart II	26	(1)
- * Club domestic league appearances and goals as of 30 May 2026

Michael Harald Glück (born 13 June 2003) is an Austrian professional footballer who plays as a defender for 3. Liga club VfB Stuttgart II. He has also played for 1860 Munich II and Hessen Kassel.

== Career ==
Glück played for the youth sections of Union Ostermiething, Wacker Burghausen, and 1860 Munich between 2010 and 2021. Glück played for 1860 Munich II in the Oberliga Bayern Süd during the 2021–22 season, where he made eight appearances, and 2022–23 season where he made 11 appearances. He made his debut for the first team during the 2022–23 season before being loaned to Hessen Kassel where he made 15 appearances. He returned to 1860 Munich after the season was over. Glück picked up an injury during pre–season and missed the start of the 2023–24 season against 1. FC Stockheim in the Bavarian Cup and the opening matches of the 3. Liga season against Waldhof Mannheim and MSV Duisburg. His first match of the 2023–24 season was a Bavarian Cup match against DJK Hain.

== Career statistics ==
As of match played 20 December 2023

Appearances and goals by club, season and competition
Club	Season	League			Cup		Other		Total	
Club	Season	Division	Apps	Goals	Apps	Goals	Apps	Goals	Apps	Goals
1860 Munich II	2021–22	Bayernliga Süd	8	0	—		—		8	0
1860 Munich II	2022–23	Bayernliga Süd	11	0	—		—		11	0
1860 Munich II	2023–24	Bayernliga Süd	1	0	—		—		8	0
1860 Munich II	Total		20	0	—		—		20	0
1860 Munich	2022–23	3. Liga	1	0	0	0	—		1	0
1860 Munich	2023–24	3. Liga	9	0	—		1 (Note: Appearances in the Bavarian Cup)	0	10	0
1860 Munich	Total		10	0	0	0	1	0	11	0
Hessen Kassel (loan)	2022–23	Regionalliga Südwest	15	0	—		—		15	0
Career Total			45	0	0	0	1	0	46	0
