= Fynn Lakenmacher =

German footballer (born 2000)

Personal information
- Full name: Fynn-Luca Lakenmacher
- Date of birth: 10 May 2000 (age 26)
- Place of birth: Lübbecke, Germany
- Height: 1.88 m (6 ft 2 in)
- Position: Forward

Team information
- Current team: Darmstadt 98
- Number: 19

Youth career
- SV Ochtersum
- 2010–2018: Hannover 96
- 2018–2019: TSV Havelse

Senior career*
Years	Team	Apps	(Gls)
2019–2022	TSV Havelse	51	(5)
2022–2024	1860 Munich	70	(13)
2024–	Darmstadt 98	46	(2)
- * Club domestic league appearances and goals as of 18 May 2026

Fynn-Luca Lakenmacher (born 10 May 2000) is a German professional footballer who plays as a forward for 2. Bundesliga club Darmstadt 98.

== Early life ==
Lakenmacher was born on 10 May 2000 in Lübbecke, Germany. He comes from a family of handball players.

== Career ==
Lakenmacher played for TSV Havelse in the 2019–20 and 2020–21 Regionalliga Nord seasons. He made his professional debut for TSV Havelse in the 3. Liga on 24 July 2021 against 1. FC Saarbrücken, coming on as a substitute in the 71st minute for Yannik Jaeschke.

Lakenmacher joined 1860 Munich on 18 May 2022 and scored eight goals in 35 3. Liga matches. In July 2023, Maurizio Jacobacci, head coach of 1860 Munich, stated he wanted to loan out Lakenmacher. However, Lakenmacher decided against being loaned out. Lakenmacher started the 2023–24 season with a goal against 1. FC Stockheim in the Bavarian Cup. Then three days later, Lakenmacher scored another goal against Waldhof Mannheim to begin 1860 Munich's 2023–24 3. Liga season.

In April 2024 it was announced Lakenmacher would join 2. Bundesliga side Darmstadt 98 for the 2024–25 season.

== Career statistics ==
As of match played 19 April 2024

Appearances and goals by club, season and competition
Club	Season	League			National cup		Other		Total		Ref.
Club	Season	Division	Apps	Goals	Apps	Goals	Apps	Goals	Apps	Goals	Ref.
TSV Havelse	2019–20	Regionalliga Nord	6	0	—		—		6	0	
TSV Havelse	2020–21	Regionalliga Nord	9	0	1	0	2 (Note: Appearances in the Regionalliga playoff)	0	12	0	
TSV Havelse	2021–22	3. Liga	36	5	—		—		36	5	
TSV Havelse	Total		51	5	1	0	2	0	54	5	—
1860 Munich	2022–23	3. Liga	35	8	1	0	—		36	8	
1860 Munich	2023–24	3. Liga	30	4	—		—		30	4	
1860 Munich	Total		65	12	1	0	0	0	66	12	—
Career Total			116	17	2	0	2	0	120	17	—
