= Kaan Kurt =

German footballer (born 2001)

Personal information
- Full name: Kaan Kurt
- Date of birth: 21 December 2001 (age 24)
- Place of birth: Moers, Germany
- Height: 1.74 m (5 ft 9 in)
- Position: Right-back

Team information
- Current team: SG Wattenscheid
- Number: 21

Youth career
- 2014–2020: Borussia Mönchengladbach

Senior career*
Years	Team	Apps	(Gls)
2019–2023	Borussia Mönchengladbach II	94	(2)
2023–2024	1860 Munich	13	(0)
2024–2025	Holstein Kiel II	27	(3)
2025–2026	Sportfreunde Lotte	24	(2)
2026–	SG Wattenscheid	3	(0)

International career
2016	Germany U15	2	(0)
2016–2017	Germany U16	5	(0)
2017	Germany U17	1	(0)
2018	Turkey U17	3	(0)
2018–2019	Germany U18	6	(0)
2019	Germany U19	6	(0)
2020	Germany U20	2	(0)
- * Club domestic league appearances and goals as of 23 September 2026

Kaan Kurt (born 21 December 2001) is a German professional footballer who plays as a right-back for SG Wattenscheid. He had previously played for Borussia Mönchengladbach II, 1860 Munich, Holstein Kiel II and Sportfreunde Lotte.

== Early life ==
Kurt was born in Moers, Germany.

== Club career ==
Kurt played for Borussia Mönchengladbach II in the 2019–20, 2020–21, 2021–22, and 2022–23 Regionalliga West seasons. He signed for 1860 Munich prior to the 2023–24 season. He made his debut for 1860 Munich in a 5–1 win against 1. FC Stockheim in the first round of the Bavarian Cup on 2 August 2023 and made his league debut for 1860 Munich in a 2–0 win against Waldhof Mannheim on 5 August 2023.

On 29 August 2024, Kurt joined Regionalliga side Holstein Kiel II.

== International career ==
Kurt has played for Turkey at the U17 level and Germany from the U15 level to U20 level.

== Career statistics ==
As of match played 26 August 2023

Appearances and goals by club, season and competition
Club	Season	League			Cup		Other		Total		Ref.
Club	Season	Division	Apps	Goals	Apps	Goals	Apps	Goals	Apps	Goals	Ref.
Borussia Mönchengladbach II	2019–20	Regionalliga West	13	0	—		—		13	0	
Borussia Mönchengladbach II	2020–21	Regionalliga West	33	0	—		—		33	0	
Borussia Mönchengladbach II	2021–22	Regionalliga West	26	1	—		—		26	1	
Borussia Mönchengladbach II	2022–23	Regionalliga West	22	1	—		—		22	1	
Borussia Mönchengladbach II	Total		94	2	—		—		94	2	—
1860 Munich	2023–24	3. Liga	9	0	0	0	2 (Note: Appearances in the Bavarian Cup)	0	11	0	
Career total			103	2	0	0	2	0	105	2	
