= Tarsis Bonga =

German footballer

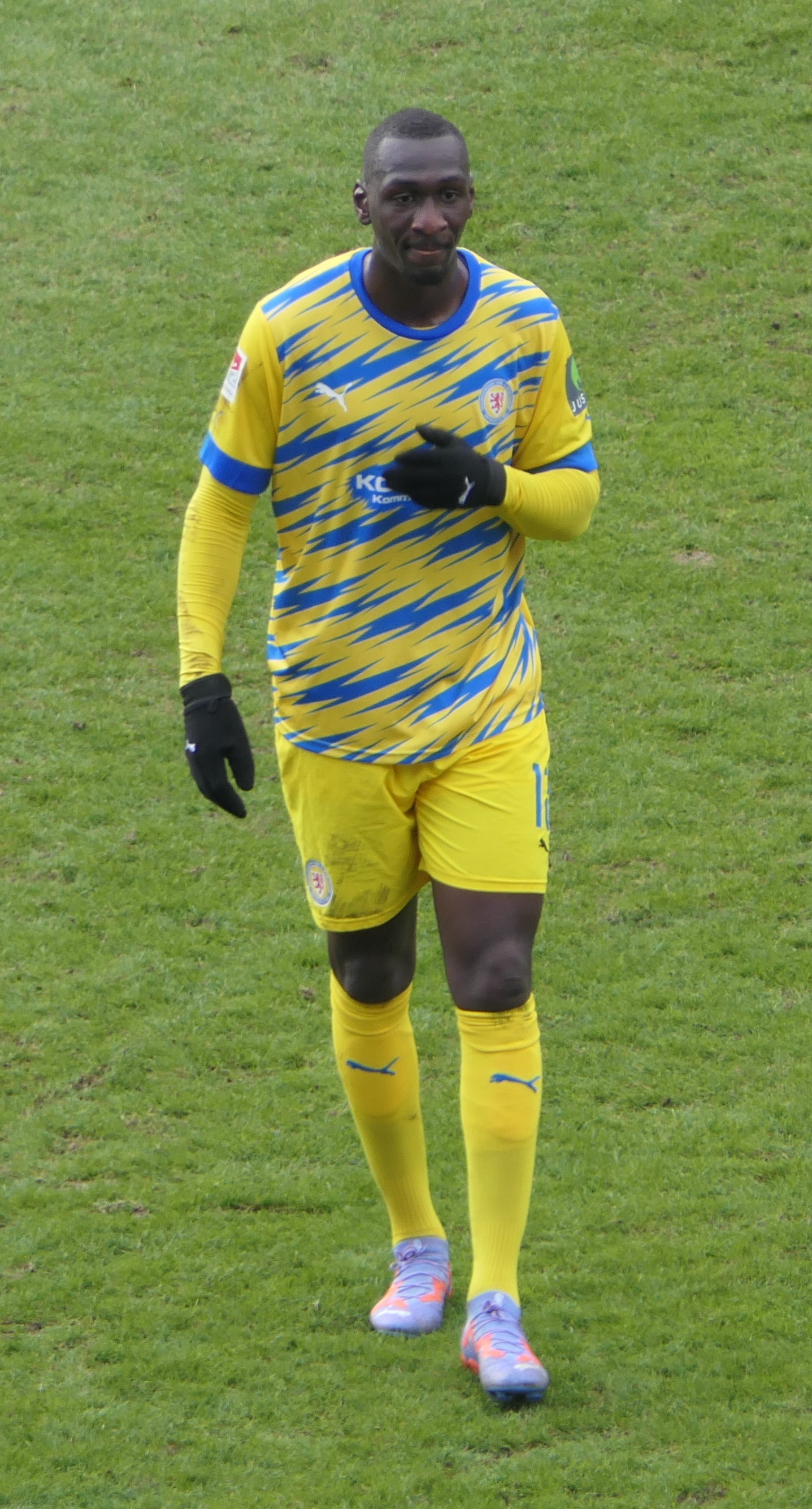
- Tarsis Bonga

Personal information
- Date of birth: 10 January 1997 (age 29)
- Place of birth: Neuwied, Germany
- Height: 1.97 m (6 ft 6 in)
- Position: Right winger

Team information
- Current team: Würzburger Kickers
- Number: 30

Youth career
- –2013: TuS Koblenz
- 2013–2015: Bonner SC
- 2015–2016: Bayer Leverkusen

Senior career*
Years	Team	Apps	(Gls)
2016–2018	Fortuna Düsseldorf II	44	(4)
2018–2019	FSV Zwickau	32	(3)
2019–2020	Chemnitzer FC	37	(4)
2020–2023	VfL Bochum	14	(0)
2023	Eintracht Braunschweig	13	(0)
2023–2024	1860 Munich	7	(0)
2024	Hallescher FC	13	(0)
2024–2025	Rot-Weiß Oberhausen	23	(9)
2025–	Würzburger Kickers	32	(15)
- * Club domestic league appearances and goals as of 28 June 2026

Tarsis Bonga (born 10 January 1997) is a German professional footballer who plays as a right winger for 3. Liga club Würzburger Kickers.

== Club career ==
=== Early career ===
On 24 January 2023, Bonga signed with Eintracht Braunschweig for the remainder of the 2022–23 season.

=== 1860 Munich ===
He started the 2023–24 season with an appearance against 1. FC Stockheim in the Bavarian Cup. Bonga scored four goals in a Bavarian Cup match against DJK Hain. He was released by the club on 5 January 2024.

=== Hallescher FC ===
On 5 January 2024, Bonga signed with Hallescher FC.

=== Rot-Weiß Oberhausen ===
On 4 October 2024, Bonga joined Rot-Weiß Oberhausen.

== Personal life ==
Born in Germany, Bonga is of Congolese descent. Bonga's younger brother, Isaac, is a professional basketball player for KK Partizan.

== Career statistics ==
As of match played on 5 September 2023

Club statistics
Club	Season	League			National Cup		Other		Total	
Club	Season	Division	Apps	Goals	Apps	Goals	Apps	Goals	Apps	Goals
Fortuna Düsseldorf II	2016–17	Regionalliga West	23	0	—		—		23	0
Fortuna Düsseldorf II	2017–18	Regionalliga West	21	4	—		—		21	4
Fortuna Düsseldorf II	Fortuna Düsseldorf II totals		44	4	0	0	0	0	44	4
FSV Zwickau	2018–19	3. Liga	32	3	0	0	4 (Note: Appearance in the Saxony Cup)	1	36	4
Chemnitzer FC	2019–20	3. Liga	37	4	1	0	1	0	39	4
VfL Bochum	2020–21	2. Bundesliga	11	0	1	0	—		12	0
VfL Bochum	2021–22	Bundesliga	3	0	0	0	—		3	0
VfL Bochum	VfL Bochum Totals		14	0	1	0	0	0	15	0
Eintracht Braunschweig	2022–23	2. Bundesliga	13	0	0	0	—		13	0
1860 Munich	2023–24	3. Liga	3	0	—		3 (Note: Appearance in the Bavarian Cup)	4	1	0
Career totals			143	11	2	0	7	5	153	16
