= Kilian Ludewig =

German footballer (born 2000)

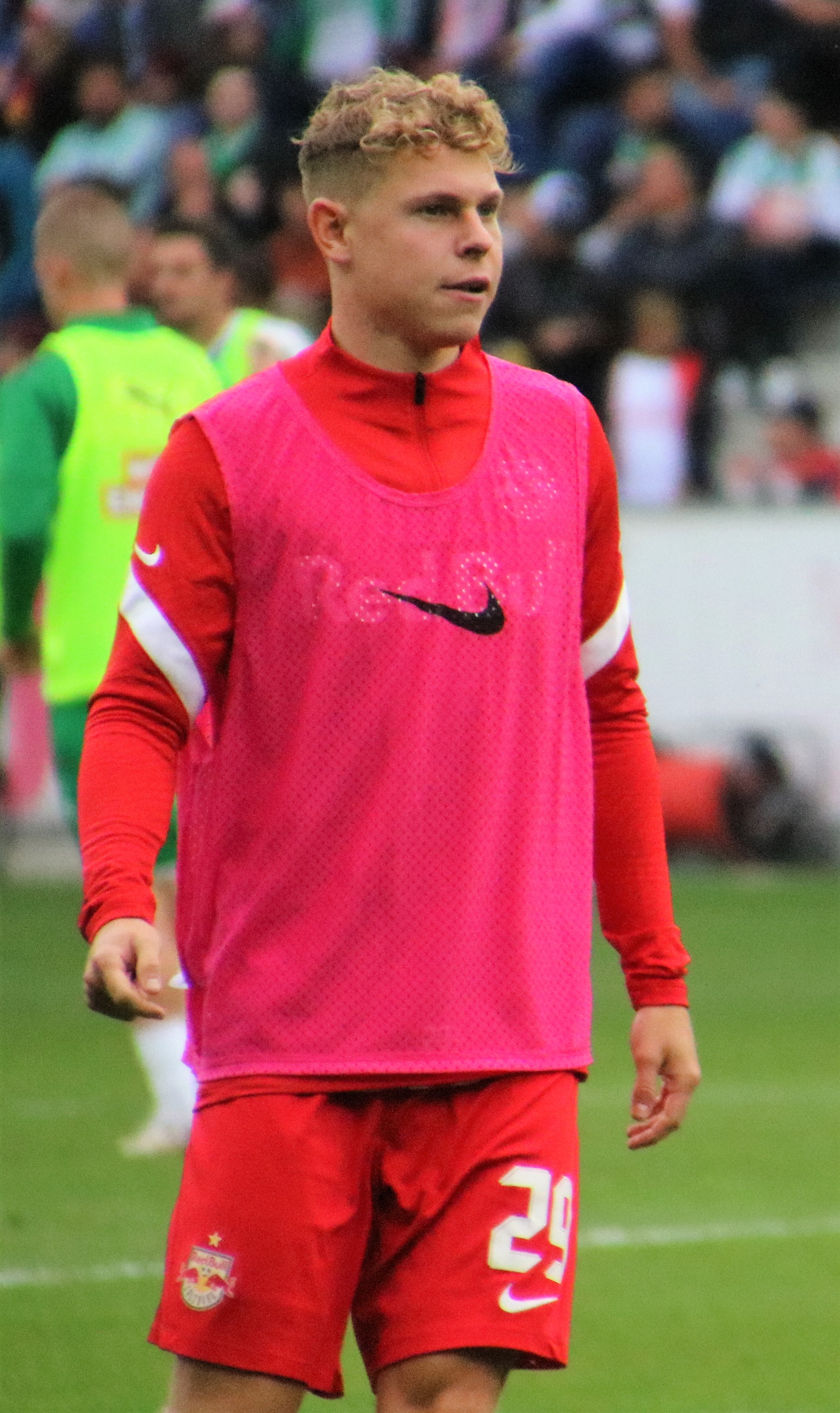
- Ludewig in 2021

Personal information
- Full name: Kilian Ludewig
- Date of birth: 5 March 2000 (age 26)
- Place of birth: Hamburg, Germany
- Height: 1.75 m (5 ft 9 in)
- Positions: Right-back; right winger

Team information
- Current team: Petrolul Ploiești
- Number: 29

Youth career
- Barsbütteler SV
- –2014: Willinghusener SC
- 2014–2015: FC St. Pauli
- 2015–2018: RB Leipzig

Senior career*
Years	Team	Apps	(Gls)
2018–2024	Red Bull Salzburg	1	(0)
2018–2019	Liefering	28	(1)
2020	→ Barnsley (loan)	22	(0)
2020–2021	→ Schalke 04 (loan)	6	(0)
2022	→ Willem II (loan)	4	(0)
2022–2023	→ AaB (loan)	19	(0)
2023–2024	→ 1860 Munich (loan)	24	(0)
2025–	Petrolul Ploiești	21	(1)

International career
2015–2016	Germany U16	8	(3)
2016–2017	Germany U17	13	(2)
2017–2018	Germany U18	4	(0)
2019	Germany U19	3	(0)
2019	Germany U20	4	(1)
2021	Germany U21	1	(0)
- * Club domestic league appearances and goals as of 6 November 2026

Kilian Ludewig (born 5 March 2000) is a German professional footballer who plays as a right-back or a right winger for Liga I club Petrolul Ploiești.

== Club career ==
=== Youth career ===
Ludewig started playing football at Barsbütteler SV and Willinghusener SC before moving to the youth academy of FC St. Pauli in 2014. After just one year, he moved on to RB Leipzig. In November 2015, he made his debut for Leipzig's under-19 team in the Under 19 Bundesliga when he came off the bench for Przemysław Płacheta on the tenth matchday of the 2015–16 season against Hamburger SV in injury time. In December 2015, he made his first appearance for Leipzig's under-17 team in the Under 17 Bundesliga against VfL Wolfsburg. In August 2016, he scored his first three goals in the Under 17 Bundesliga in an 8–0 win against Niendorfer TSV.

Ludewig was officially promoted to the under-19 ahead of the 2017–18 season. He scored his first goal in the Under 19 Bundesliga in August 2017 in a 2–0 victory against Hertha BSC. Between September and December 2017, he also played three games for RB Leipzig in the UEFA Youth League.

=== Red Bull Salzburg ===
Ludewig joined Austrian Football Bundesliga club Red Bull Salzburg in June 2018, signing a four-year contract. He was also initially available for selection by reserve team FC Liefering. He made his debut for Liefering in September 2018 in a game against FC Juniors OÖ.

After one and a half years on loan in England and Germany, Ludewig returned to Red Bull Salzburg for the 2021–22 season. There, he made his debut in the Bundesliga in October 2021 against LASK. However, this remained his only appearance for Red Bull Salzburg beside one appearance in an Austrian Cup game against SKN St. Pölten.

After six years with the club, his contract was terminated on 5 July 2024.

==== Loan to Barnsley ====
After having only appeared for FC Liefering through one and a half seasons, Ludewig joined English club Barnsley on loan on 9 January 2020. After making 18 games for Barnsley in the EFL Championship and avoiding relegation, the loan was extended for another season in August 2020.

==== Loan to Schalke 04 ====
After another four second-tier appearances for Barnsley, however, the loan was terminated prematurely in October 2020 and Ludewig was loaned to German Bundesliga club Schalke 04 for the remainder of the season. A few days earlier, Manuel Baum, under whom Ludewig had played in the national under-20 side, had taken over as head coach of Schalke. In Gelsenkirchen Ludewig only made six league appearances as he had missed a large part of the season due to a metatarsal fracture suffered in December 2020. Schalkern suffered a historic relegation at the end of the season.

==== Loan to Willem II ====
On 13 January 2022, Ludewig was loaned to Dutch club Willem II in the Eredivisie, until the end of the season. In Tilburg, however, he was also unable to assert himself and was only featured four times in the Eredivisie. The club suffered relegation at the end of the season.

==== Loan to AaB ====
On 24 June 2022, Ludewig was sent on a one-season loan to Danish Superliga club AaB.

==== Loan to TSV 1860 Munich ====
On 11 July 2023, Ludewig moved on loan to TSV 1860 Munich in German 3. Liga. He started the 2023–24 season with an appearance against 1. FC Stockheim in the Bavarian Cup.

=== Petrolul Ploieşti ===
On 11 February 2025, Ludewig has signed with Romanian club Petrolul Ploieşti.

== Career statistics ==
As of match played 6 November 2026

Appearances and goals by club, season and competition
Club	Season	League			National cup (Note: Includes Austrian Cup, DFB-Pokal, Danish Cup, Bavarian Cup, Cupa României)		Europe		Other		Total	
Club	Season	Division	Apps	Goals	Apps	Goals	Apps	Goals	Apps	Goals	Apps	Goals
Red Bull Salzburg	2018–19	Austrian Bundesliga	0	0	0	0	0	0	—		0	0
Red Bull Salzburg	2019–20	Austrian Bundesliga	0	0	0	0	0	0	—		0	0
Red Bull Salzburg	2020–21	Austrian Bundesliga	0	0	—		—		—		0	0
Red Bull Salzburg	2021–22	Austrian Bundesliga	1	0	1	0	0	0	—		2	0
Red Bull Salzburg	Total		1	0	1	0	0	0	—		2	0
Liefering	2018–19	2. Liga	18	1	—		—		—		18	1
Liefering	2019–20	2. Liga	10	0	—		—		—		10	0
Liefering	Total		28	1	—		—		—		28	1
Barnsley (loan)	2019–20	EFL Championship	18	0	0	0	—		—		18	0
Barnsley (loan)	2020–21	EFL Championship	4	0	—		—		3 (Note: Appearances in EFL Cup)	0	7	0
Barnsley (loan)	Total		22	0	0	0	—		3	0	25	0
Schalke 04 (loan)	2020–21	Bundesliga	6	0	2	0	—		—		8	0
Willem II (loan)	2021–22	Eredivisie	4	0	—		—		—		4	0
AaB (loan)	2022–23	Danish Superliga	19	0	5	0	—		—		24	0
1860 Munich (loan)	2023–24	3. Liga	24	0	4	0	—		—		28	0
Petrolul Ploiești	2024–25	Liga I	5	0	—		—		—		5	0
Petrolul Ploiești	2025–26	Liga I	8	1	0	0	—		—		8	1
Petrolul Ploiești	2026–27	Liga I	8	0	3	0	—		—		11	0
Petrolul Ploiești	Total		21	1	3	0	—		—		24	1
Career total			125	2	15	0	0	0	3	0	143	2

== Honours ==
AaB

- Danish Cup runner-up: 2022–23
