= Niklas Tarnat =

German footballer (born 1998)

Personal information
- Date of birth: 26 May 1998 (age 28)
- Place of birth: Solingen, Germany
- Height: 1.79 m (5 ft 10 in)
- Position: Midfielder

Team information
- Current team: SV Sandhausen
- Number: 6

Youth career
- –2009: Rot-Weiss Essen
- 2009–2017: Bayern Munich

Senior career*
Years	Team	Apps	(Gls)
2017	Bayern Munich II	13	(0)
2018–2021	Hannover 96 II	62	(2)
2020–2021	Hannover 96	2	(0)
2021–2023	Rot-Weiss Essen	57	(0)
2023–2024	TSV 1860 Munich	12	(0)
2024–2025	SGV Freiberg	32	(2)
2025–	SV Sandhausen	40	(2)
- * Club domestic league appearances and goals as of 24 September 2026

Niklas Tarnat (born 26 May 1998) is a German professional footballer who plays as a midfielder for SV Sandhausen.

== Career ==
Tarnat made his professional debut for Hannover 96 in the 2. Bundesliga on 3 January 2021, coming on as a substitute in the 88th minute for Dominik Kaiser against SV Sandhausen. The home match finished as a 4–0 win for Hannover. He left the club ahead of the 2021–22 season.

On 21 July 2023, Tarnat signed with 3. Liga club TSV 1860 Munich. He started the 2023–24 season with an appearance against 1. FC Stockheim in the Bavarian Cup.

On 12 June 2025, Tarnat signed with Regionalliga Südwest club SV Sandhausen.

== Personal life ==
Tarnat is the son of former Germany national team player Michael Tarnat.
