= Albert Sinabov =

Bulgarian footballer (born 2007)

Personal information
- Full name: Albert Nikolaev Sinabov
- Date of birth: 24 May 2007 (age 19)
- Place of birth: Ruse, Bulgaria
- Positions: Forward; midfielder

Team information
- Current team: Augsburg

Youth career
- Ariston Ruse
- 2017–2018: Augsburg
- 2018–2022: 1860 Munich
- 2022–: Augsburg

International career
Years	Team	Apps	(Gls)
2022	Bulgaria U15		
2022–	Bulgaria U16		

Albert Nikolaev Sinabov (Bulgarian: Алберт Николаев Синабов; born 24 May 2007) is a Bulgarian professional footballer who plays as a forward or midfielder for Augsburg.

== Club career ==
Born in Ruse, Bulgaria, Sinabov began his career with local side Ariston Ruse - the team his father, Nikolay, had formed. After his family moved to Germany in 2017, he joined the academy of professional side Augsburg, representing the club up to under-12 level before moving to 1860 Munich at the age of eleven.

== International career ==
Sinabov has represented Bulgaria at under-15 and under-16 level.

== Style of play ==
A centre forward at club level, Sinabov is also capable of playing as an attacking midfielder, which he has done for the youth teams of Bulgaria. While at 1860 Munich, he was compared by a coach to former German international Franz Beckenbauer for his presence on the pitch. He has also been noted for his athleticism and footwork on the ball, while his anticipation and decision-making have also earned praise.

== Personal life ==
His brother, Alekzandar-Boris, is also a footballer, and currently plays for TSV Buchbach.
