= Jannik Mause =

German footballer (born 1998)

Personal information
- Date of birth: 11 July 1998 (age 28)
- Place of birth: Baesweiler, Germany
- Height: 1.88 m (6 ft 2 in)
- Position: Forward

Team information
- Current team: Fortuna Köln
- Number: 37

Youth career
- SC 07/86 Setterich
- TSV Hertha Walheim
- –2014: Roda JC
- 2014–2016: 1. FC Köln
- 2016–2017: Mainz 05

Senior career*
Years	Team	Apps	(Gls)
2016	1. FC Köln II	2	(0)
2017–2019	Mainz 05 II	53	(8)
2019–2020	Steinbach Haiger	16	(2)
2020–2021	SV Rödinghausen	16	(2)
2021	FC Wegberg-Beeck	17	(6)
2021–2023	Alemannia Aachen	52	(22)
2023–2024	FC Ingolstadt	33	(18)
2024–2026	1. FC Kaiserslautern	12	(0)
2025	→ Greuther Fürth (loan)	5	(0)
2025	1. FC Kaiserslautern II	1	(1)
2025–2026	→ Rot-Weiss Essen (loan)	11	(3)
2026–	Fortuna Köln	0	(0)
- * Club domestic league appearances and goals as of 30 August 2026

Jannik Mause (born 11 July 1998) is a German professional footballer who plays as a forward for 3. Liga club Fortuna Köln.

== Early life ==
Mause joined the youth academy of German Bundesliga side Mainz 05 at the age of nineteen.

== Club career ==
In 2019, Mause signed for German side Steinbach Haiger. In 2020, he signed for German side SV Rödinghausen. In 2021, he signed for German side FC Wegberg-Beeck. After that, he signed for German side Alemannia Aachen. In 2023, he signed for German side FC Ingolstadt. He was regarded as one of the club's most important players.

In July 2024, Mause signed for 2. Bundesliga club 1. FC Kaiserslautern.

On 28 January 2025, Mause was loaned to Greuther Fürth in 2. Bundesliga. On 29 August 2025, Mause moved on a new loan to Rot-Weiss Essen in 3. Liga.

== International career ==
Mause has represented Germany internationally at youth level.

== Style of play ==
Mause mainly operates as a striker.

== Personal life ==
Mause's parents have lived in North Rhine-Westphalia, Germany.

== Career statistics ==
As of match played 5 April 2025

Appearances and goals by club, season and competition
Club	Season	League			DFB Pokal		Other		Total	
Club	Season	Division	Apps	Goals	Apps	Goals	Apps	Goals	Apps	Goals
Köln II	2015-16	Regionalliga West	2	0	—		—		2	0
Mainz 05 II	2017-18	Regionalliga Südwest	27	6	—		—		27	6
Mainz 05 II	2018-19	Regionalliga Südwest	26	2	—		—		26	2
Mainz 05 II	Total		53	8	—		—		53	8
Steinbach Haiger	2019-20	Regionalliga Südwest	16	2	—		—		16	2
SV Rödinghausen	2020-21	Regionalliga West	16	2	—		—		16	2
Wegberg-Beeck	2020-21	Regionalliga West	17	6	—		—		17	6
Alemannia Aachen	2021-22	Regionalliga West	24	8	—		—		24	8
Alemannia Aachen	2022-23	Regionalliga West	28	14	—		—		28	14
Alemannia Aachen	Total		52	22	—		—		52	22
Ingolstadt	2023-24	3. Liga	33	18	—		—		33	18
1. FC Kaiserslautern	2024-25	2. Bundesliga	12	0	1	2	—		13	2
Greuther Fürth (loan)	2024-25	2. Bundesliga	5	0	0	0	—		5	0
Career total			206	58	1	2	—		207	60
