= Simon Scherder =

German footballer (born 1993)

Personal information
- Date of birth: 2 April 1993 (age 33)
- Place of birth: Hörstel, Germany
- Height: 1.89 m (6 ft 2 in)
- Position: Centre-back

Team information
- Current team: Preußen Münster
- Number: 15

Senior career*
Years	Team	Apps	(Gls)
2011–	Preußen Münster	284	(28)
- * Club domestic league appearances and goals as of 28 December 2025

Simon Scherder (born 2 April 1993) is a German professional footballer who plays as a centre-back for Preußen Münster.

== Career ==
Scherder made his professional debut for Preußen Münster in December 2012, as a substitute for Matt Taylor in a 4–0 win over Arminia Bielefeld in the 3. Liga.

== Honours ==
Preußen Münster

- Regionalliga West: 2022–23
