= Leroy Kwadwo =

German footballer (born 1996)

Personal information
- Date of birth: 15 August 1996 (age 30)
- Place of birth: Herten, Germany
- Height: 1.85 m (6 ft 1 in)
- Position: Defender

Youth career
- SG Wattenscheid
- Rot-Weiss Essen
- –2014: Westfalia Herne
- 2014–2015: TSG Sprockhövel

Senior career*
Years	Team	Apps	(Gls)
2015–2016	TSG Sprockhövel	30	(3)
2016–2017	Rot-Weiss Essen	1	(0)
2017	Schalke 04 II	0	(0)
2017–2019	Fortuna Düsseldorf II	38	(0)
2019–2021	Würzburger Kickers	29	(1)
2021	Dynamo Dresden	12	(0)
2021–2023	MSV Duisburg	37	(0)
2023–2025	1860 Munich	56	(3)
2026	Borussia Dortmund II	9	(0)
- * Club domestic league appearances and goals as of 3 May 2026

Leroy Kwadwo (born 15 August 1996) is a German professional footballer who plays as a defender, most recently for Regionalliga West club Borussia Dortmund II.

== Early and personal life ==
Kwadwo was born in Herten, North Rhine-Westphalia, Germany. His father Osam is from Ghana but emigrated to Germany in the 1980s in order to study, and played in the then third-tier Oberliga Westfalen. His sisters Yasmin and Keshia are both professional athletes.

== Career ==
=== Early career ===
Kwadwo started playing youth football for SG Wattenscheid at the age of 6, and later played youth football for Rot-Weiss Essen, Westfalia Herne and TSG Sprockhövel. His scored once in three games for Sprockhövel in the 2014–15 Oberliga Westfalen, and twice in twenty-seven games in the 2015–16 Oberliga Westfalen.

Kwadwo joined Rot-Weiss Essen on a two-year contract in summer 2016. However, he played just once in the Regionalliga West before signing for Schalke 04 II in January 2017 on a contract until 2018, where he failed to make an appearance.

=== Fortuna Düsseldorf II ===
On 4 July 2017, Kwadwo signed for Fortuna Düsseldorf II following a trial spell with the club. He played 20 times in the 2017–18 season and 18 times in the 2018–19 season.

=== Würzburger Kickers ===
In June 2019, it was announced that Kwadwo had joined Würzburger Kickers on a one-year contract with the option of a further season. Kwadwo made his professional debut in the 3. Liga for Würzburger Kickers on 20 July 2019, starting against Bayern Munich II before being substituted out in the 83rd minute for Lion Schweers, with the home match finishing as a 3–1 win. He scored his first goal in professional football in the reverse fixture with a late equaliser in a 1–1 draw with Bayern Munich II on 22 December 2019. Towards the end of Würzburg's 3. Liga match away to Preußen Münster on 14 February 2020, 'monkey noises' was directed at Kwadwo from a home spectator, causing the game to be briefly paused while they were ejected from the ground by the stewards. In response, supporters of both sides chanted "Nazis raus", which translates to "Nazis out". He played 25 times in the league for Würzburger Kickers across the 2019–20 season, scoring one goal. In July 2020, his contract with the club was extended. He played 4 times for the club in the 2020–21 season.

=== Dynamo Dresden ===
On 18 January 2021, Kwadwo joined Dynamo Dresden on a contract until the end of the season.

=== MSV Duisburg ===
After a half year at Dresden, he joined MSV Duisburg in the summer of 2021. In May 2023, it was announced that he would leave Duisburg after the 2022–23 season.

=== 1860 Munich ===
He moved to 1860 Munich on 28 July 2023. He started the 2023–24 season with two yellow cards and a red card against 1. FC Stockheim in the Bavarian Cup.

=== Borussia Dortmund II ===
On 14 January 2026, Borussia Dortmund announced the signing of Kwadwo to Borussia Dortmund II on a contract until 30 June 2026. On 18 May 2026, Borussia Dortmund confirmed that Kwadwo would leave the club at the end of his contract.

== Career statistics ==
As of 27 May 2023

Appearances and goals by club, season and competition
Club	Season	Division	League		Cup		Total	
Club	Season	Division	Apps	Goals	Apps	Goals	Apps	Goals
TSG Sprockhövel	2014–15	Oberliga Westfalen	3	1	—		3	1
TSG Sprockhövel	2015–16	Oberliga Westfalen	27	2	—		27	2
TSG Sprockhövel	Total		30	3	—		30	3
Rot-Weiss Essen	2016–17	Regionalliga West	1	0	—		1	0
Schalke 04 II	2016–17	Regionalliga West	0	0	—		0	0
Fortuna Düsseldorf II	2017–18	Regionalliga West	20	0	—		20	0
Fortuna Düsseldorf II	2018–19	Regionalliga West	18	0	—		18	0
Fortuna Düsseldorf II	Total		38	0	—		38	0
Würzburger Kickers	2019–20	3. Liga	25	1	1	0	26	1
Würzburger Kickers	2020–21	2. Bundesliga	4	0	1	0	5	0
Würzburger Kickers	Total		29	1	2	0	31	1
Dynamo Dresden	2020–21	3. Liga	12	0	—		12	0
MSV Duisburg	2021–22	3. Liga	27	0	—		27	0
MSV Duisburg	2022–23	3. Liga	10	0	—		10	0
MSV Duisburg	Total		37	0	0	0	37	0
1860 Munich	2023–24	3. Liga	0	0	—		0	0
Career total			147	4	2	0	149	4
