= Marlon Frey =

German footballer

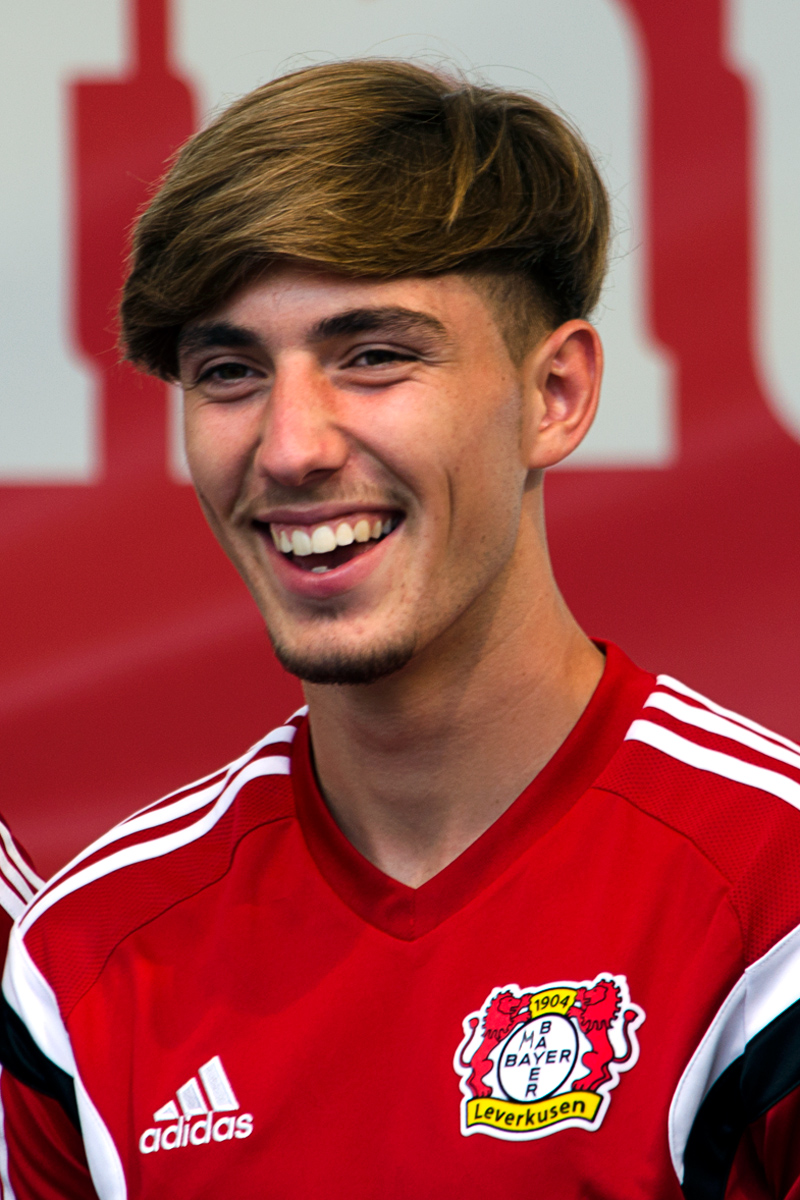
- Frey in 2015

Personal information
- Date of birth: 24 March 1996 (age 30)
- Place of birth: Düsseldorf, Germany
- Height: 1.80 m (5 ft 11 in)
- Position: Midfielder

Team information
- Current team: 1. FC Bocholt
- Number: 18

Youth career
- –2004: Rather SV
- 2004–2015: Bayer Leverkusen

Senior career*
Years	Team	Apps	(Gls)
2015–2018	Bayer Leverkusen	9	(0)
2016–2017	→ 1. FC Kaiserslautern (loan)	11	(0)
2016–2017	→ 1. FC Kaiserslautern II (loan)	6	(0)
2018–2019	Jong PSV	31	(1)
2019–2021	SV Sandhausen	25	(0)
2020–2021	SV Sandhausen II	1	(0)
2021–2023	MSV Duisburg	87	(2)
2023–2025	1860 Munich	47	(1)
2025–	1. FC Bocholt	25	(3)
- * Club domestic league appearances and goals as of 23 September 2026

Marlon Frey (born 24 March 1996) is a German professional footballer who plays as a midfielder for 1. FC Bocholt.

== Club career ==
Frey joined Bayer 04 Leverkusen in 2004 and was promoted to the senior team in 2015. He made his Bundesliga debut on 12 December 2015 against Borussia Mönchengladbach, replacing Kevin Kampl in the 87th minute in a 5–0 home win. For the 2016–17 season, he was loaned to 1. FC Kaiserslautern and made 11 appearances in the 2. Bundesliga. He left Leverkusen at his contract expiry in 2018.

On 30 August 2018, Frey signed for PSV Eindhoven on a one-year deal to play for their Jong PSV side.

SV Sandhausen announced on 31 May 2019, that Frey had joined the club on a two-year contract.

In January 2021, after being released from his contract by Sandhausen, Frey moved to 3. Liga club MSV Duisburg. He signed a contract until the end of the season. He signed a new two-year contract on 27 May 2021. After the 2022–23 season, he moved to 1860 Munich. Frey started the 2023–24 season with two goal against 1. FC Stockheim in the Bavarian Cup.

== Career statistics ==
As of 15 August 2023

Appearances and goals by club, season and competition
Club	Season	Division	League		Cup		Other		Total	
Club	Season	Division	Apps	Goals	Apps	Goals	Apps	Goals	Apps	Goals
Bayer Leverkusen	2015–16	Bundesliga	9	0	1	0	2 (Note: Appearances in the UEFA Europa League)	0	12	0
Bayer Leverkusen	2017–18	Bundesliga	0	0	0	0	—		0	0
Bayer Leverkusen	Total		9	0	1	0	2	0	12	0
1. FC Kaiserslautern (loan)	2016–17	2. Bundesliga	11	0	1	0	—		12	0
1. FC Kaiserslautern II (loan)	2016–17	Regionalliga Südwest	6	0	—		—		6	0
Jong PSV	2018–19	Eerste Divisie	31	1	—		—		31	1
SV Sandhausen	2019–20	2. Bundesliga	25	0	1	0	—		26	0
SV Sandhausen	2020–21	2. Bundesliga	0	0	0	0	—		0	0
SV Sandhausen	Total		25	0	1	0	—		26	0
SV Sandhausen II	2020–21	Oberliga Baden-Württemberg	1	0	—		—		1	0
MSV Duisburg	2020–21	3. Liga	19	0	—		—		19	0
MSV Duisburg	2021–22	3. Liga	35	1	—		—		35	1
MSV Duisburg	2022–23	3. Liga	33	1	—		—		33	1
MSV Duisburg	Total		87	2	0	0	—		87	2
1860 Munich	2023–24	3. Liga	0	0	—		2 (Note: Appearances in the Bavarian Cup)	2	2	2
Career total			170	3	3	0	4	2	177	5
