= Thomas Wörle =

German footballer

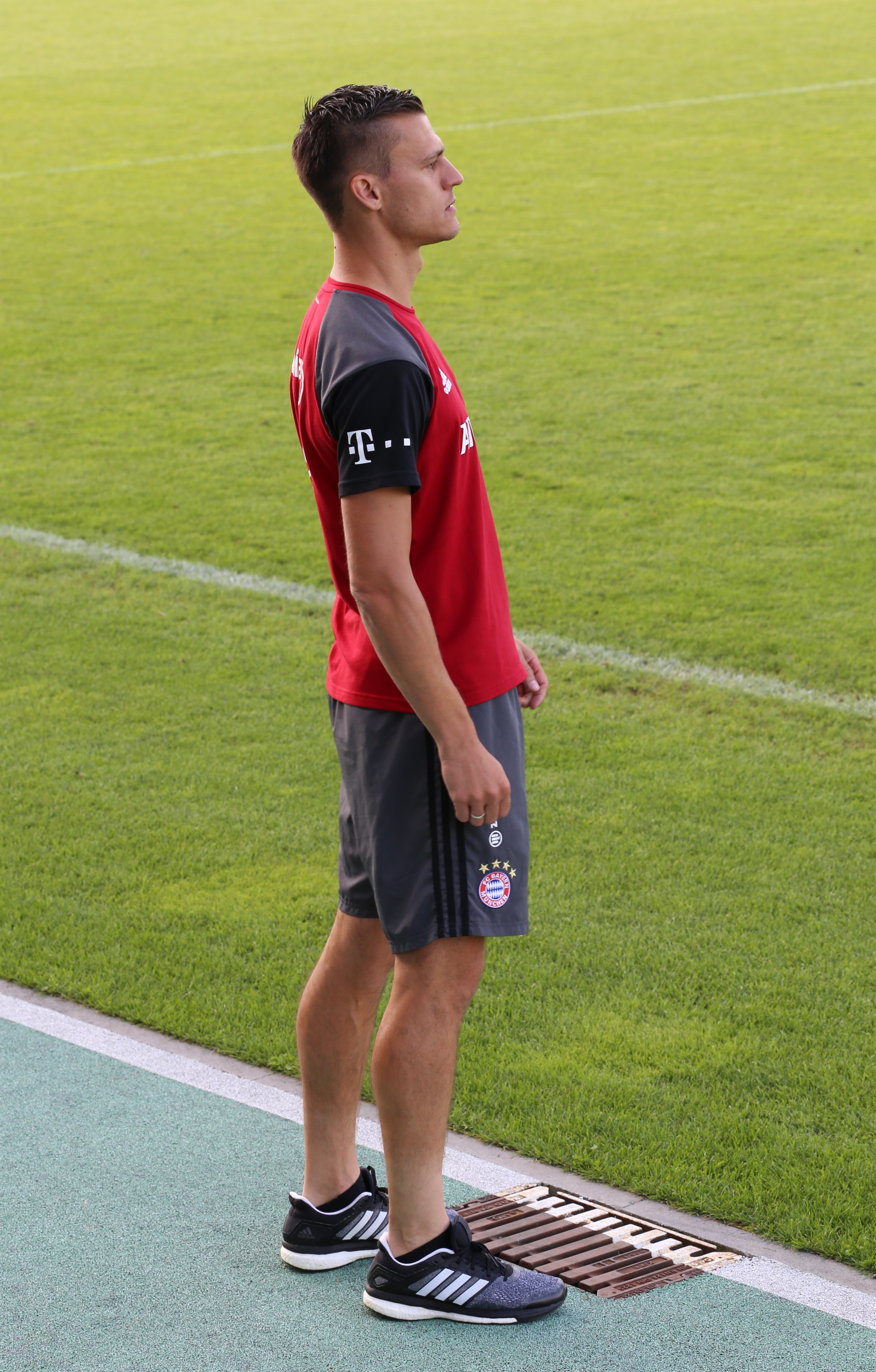

Personal information
- Date of birth: 11 February 1982 (age 44)
- Place of birth: Krumbach, West Germany
- Position: Midfielder

Team information
- Current team: Preußen Münster (manager)

Youth career
- TSG Tannhausen
- –1998: VfB Stuttgart
- 1998–2000: FC Augsburg

Senior career*
Years	Team	Apps	(Gls)
2000–2002	FC Augsburg	49	(2)
2002–2003	TSV Krumbach		
2003–2005	TSV 1860 Munich	65	(4)
2005–2008	Kickers Offenbach	85	(4)
2008–2010	Greuther Fürth	12	(0)
Total		211	(10)

International career
- Germany Youth

Managerial career
- 2010–2019: Bayern Munich (women)
- 2021–2025: SSV Ulm
- 2026–: Preußen Münster
- * Club domestic league appearances and goals

Thomas Wörle (born 11 February 1982) is a German former footballer and current manager of Preußen Münster.

He is the brother of former Bayern Munich striker Tanja Wörle and succeeded his father Günther Wörle as coach of the club's women's team.

== Coaching career ==
=== Bayern Munich (women) ===
Wörle became the head coach of the Bayern Munich women's team on 1 July 2010. Bayern Munich finished the 2010–11 Women's Bundesliga in fifth place. In the 2010–11 season, Bayern Munich also got to the semi–final of the 2010–11 Women's DFB-Pokal and won the 2011 Bundesliga Cup. Bayern Munich dropped down to sixth place in the 2011–12 Women's Bundesliga. However, they advanced to the final of the 2011–12 Women's DFB-Pokal and defeated 1. FFC Frankfurt in the final. Bayern Munich moved up to fourth place in the 2012–13 Women's Bundesliga and got to the semi–finals of the 2012–13 Women's DFB-Pokal. Bayern Munich remained in fourth place in the following season Bayern Munich were knocked–out of the 2013–14 edition of the Women's DFB-Pokal by 1. FC Köln in the round of 16. Bayern Munich won the 2014–15 Women's Bundesliga and got to the quarter–finals of the 2014–15 Women's DFB-Pokal. Bayern Munich were eliminated in the first round of the 2015–16 UEFA Women's Champions League. Bayern Munich won their second consecutive league title in the 2015–16 Women's Bundesliga. Bayern Munich were eliminated in the semi–finals of the 2015–16 Women's DFB-Pokal. Bayern Munich finished the 2016–17 season in second place in the Women's Bundesliga, quarter–finals of the Women's DFB-Pokal and 2016–17 UEFA Women's Champions League. Again, Bayern Munich finished the 2017–18 Women's Bundesliga in second place. They were also knocked–out in the first round of the 2017–18 UEFA Women's Champions League and lost in the final of the 2017–18 Women's DFB-Pokal. Bayern Munich finished again in second place in the Women's Bundesliga, got to the semi–finals in the 2018–19 UEFA Women's Champions League, and got to the quarter–finals of the 2017–18 Women's DFB-Pokal.

=== SSV Ulm 1846 ===
Wörle was appointed head coach of SSV Ulm 1846 on 1 July 2021. In his first season, he guided the club to a second-place finish in the 2021–22 Regionalliga Südwest. Ulm were eliminated from the 2021–22 DFB-Pokal by 1. FC Nürnberg and reached the final of the Württemberg Cup.

During the 2022–23 season, Ulm won the Regionalliga Südwest title, finishing one point ahead of TSV Steinbach Haiger, and secured promotion to the 2023–24 3. Liga. In cup competition, the team reached the round of 16 of the Württemberg Cup before being eliminated by Sport-Union Neckarsulm.

In the 2023–24 season, Wörle led Ulm to a second consecutive promotion, earning direct promotion to the 2. Bundesliga. However, the following campaign proved more difficult. In March 2025, the club parted ways with Wörle, with Ulm in 17th place on 19 points, four points adrift of both the relegation play-off position and safety. Under his successor, Robert Lechleiter, Ulm were ultimately relegated.

=== Preußen Münster ===
In May 2026, he was named head coach of Preußen Münster.

== Coaching record ==
As of match played 11 March 2025

Team	From	To	Record								Ref.
Team	From	To	M	W	D	L	GF	GA	GD	Win %	Ref.
Bayern Munich (women)	1 July 2010	30 June 2019	256	171	34	51	643	234	+409	66.80	
SSV Ulm 1846	1 July 2021	11 March 2025	151	83	35	33	243	128	+115	54.97	
Total			407	254	69	84	886	362	+524	62.41	—

== Honours ==
=== Managerial honours ===
FC Bayern Munich Women

- Bundesliga: Winner 2015, 2016
- DFB-Pokal: Winner 2012
- Bundesliga Cup: Winner 2011

SSV Ulm 1846

- Regionalliga Südwest Winner 2023
