= Niklas Lang =

German footballer (born 2002)

Personal information
- Date of birth: 13 June 2002 (age 24)
- Place of birth: Starnberg, Germany
- Height: 1.85 m (6 ft 1 in)
- Position: Centre-back

Team information
- Current team: Vaduz
- Number: 27

Youth career
- –2014: SpVgg Unterhaching
- 2014–2019: 1860 Munich

Senior career*
Years	Team	Apps	(Gls)
2019–2024	1860 Munich II	17	(0)
2019–2024	1860 Munich	57	(1)
2024	→ SC Freiburg II (loan)	14	(0)
2024–2025	SV Sandhausen	13	(0)
2025–	Vaduz	34	(2)
- * Club domestic league appearances and goals as of 28 September 2026

Niklas Lang (born 13 June 2002) is a German professional footballer who plays as a centre-back for Liechtensteiner Swiss Super League club Vaduz.

== Career ==
Lang made his professional debut for 1860 Munich in the final of the 2019–20 Bavarian Cup on 5 September 2020, starting against Würzburger Kickers, who had been promoted from the 3. Liga to the 2. Bundesliga at the end of the season. The home match finished as a 4–1 on penalties for 1860 following a 1–1 draw after 90 minutes.

He signed a contract extension with 1860 Munich on 27 May 2022, after making his first-team breakthrough.

He started the 2023–24 season with an appearance against 1. FC Stockheim in the Bavarian Cup. In January 2024, he joined SC Freiburg II on loan for the remainder of the season.

In June 2024, Lang agreed to join 3. Liga club SV Sandhausen upon the expiration of his contract.

On 7 July 2025, Lang joined Swiss Challenge League side FC Vaduz on a one-year contract.

== Career statistics ==
As of 20 November 2025

Appearances and goals by club, season and competition
Club	Season	League			National Cup		Continental (Note: Appearances in UEFA Conference League)		Other (Note: Appearances in Badenpokal and Bayernpokal)		Total	
Club	Season	Division	Apps	Goals	Apps	Goals	Apps	Goals	Apps	Goals	Apps	Goals
1860 Munich	2019–20	3. Liga	0	0	0	0	—		1	0	1	0
1860 Munich	2020–21	3. Liga	6	0	0	0	—		2	0	8	0
1860 Munich	2021–22	3. Liga	22	0	2	0	—		3	0	27	0
1860 Munich	2022–23	3. Liga	15	0	1	0	—		3	1	19	1
1860 Munich	2023–24	3. Liga	14	1	0	0	—		2	1	16	2
1860 Munich	Total		57	1	3	0	—		11	2	69	3
1860 Munich II	2020–21	Bayernliga Süd	15	0	—		—		—		15	0
1860 Munich II	2021–22	Bayernliga Süd	1	0	—		—		—		1	0
1860 Munich II	2022–23	Bayernliga Süd	1	0	—		—		—		1	0
1860 Munich II	Total		17	0	—		—		—		17	0
SC Freiburg II (loan)	2023–24	3. Liga	14	0	0	0	—		—		14	0
SV Sandhausen	2024–25	3. Liga	13	0	0	0	—		1	0	14	0
Vaduz	2025–26	Swiss Challenge League	8	1	2	0	1	0	—		11	1
Career total			109	2	5	0	1	0	12	2	127	4
