= Julian Guttau =

German footballer

Personal information
- Date of birth: 29 October 1999 (age 27)
- Place of birth: Halle, Germany
- Height: 1.80 m (5 ft 11 in)
- Position: Midfielder

Team information
- Current team: Energie Cottbus
- Number: 17

Youth career
- 2005–2011: SG Einheit Halle
- 2011–2018: Hallescher FC

Senior career*
Years	Team	Apps	(Gls)
2018–2022	Hallescher FC	106	(5)
2022–2023	SC Freiburg II	35	(2)
2023–2025	1860 Munich	71	(15)
2025–2026	Erzgebirge Aue	26	(8)
2026–	Energie Cottbus	0	(0)
- * Club domestic league appearances and goals as of 30 May 2026

Julian Guttau (born 29 October 1999) is a German professional footballer who plays as a midfielder for 2. Bundesliga club Energie Cottbus.

== Career ==
=== Early career ===
Guttau started out his football career in the youth department of SG Einheit Halle as a five-year-old, reportedly scoring 168 goals in 106 games for the club at youth level. He grew up as a fan of Schalke 04. Guttau moved to the academy of Hallescher FC in the summer of 2011. It was there that he made his first professional appearance in the 3. Liga when he came on as a halftime substitute for Mathias Fetsch on 15 September 2018, the seventh matchday of the 2018–19 season in a 1–2 away defeat against KFC Uerdingen 05.

=== TSV 1860 Munich ===
Guttau joined 1860 Munich in the summer of 2023. On 11 July 2023, in a pre–season win against FC Memmingen, Guttau scored the opening goal in the 3rd minute. He made his debut for 1860 Munich on 5 August 2023 in a 2–0 win against Waldhof Mannheim.

=== Energie Cottbus ===
On 13 June 2026, Guttau signed with Energie Cottbus in 2. Bundesliga.

== Career statistics ==
As of match played 21 October 2023

Appearances and goals by club, season and competition
Club	Season	League			Cup		Total	
Club	Season	Division	Apps	Goals	Apps	Goals	Apps	Goals
Hallescher FC	2018–19	3. Liga	19	0	—		19	0
Hallescher FC	2019–20	3. Liga	29	4	—		29	4
Hallescher FC	2020–21	3. Liga	26	1	—		26	1
Hallescher FC	2021–22	3. Liga	32	0	—		32	0
Hallescher FC	Total		106	5	—		106	5
SC Freiburg II	2022–23	3. Liga	35	2	—		35	2
1860 Munich	2023–24	3. Liga	11	3	—		11	3
Career Total			152	10	0	0	152	10
