= Mansour Ouro-Tagba =

Footballer (born 2004)

Personal information
- Full name: Mansour Ouro-Tagba
- Date of birth: 17 December 2004 (age 21)
- Place of birth: New York City, United States
- Height: 1.90 m (6 ft 3 in)
- Position: Forward

Team information
- Current team: VfL Bochum
- Number: 29

Youth career
- 2014–2023: 1860 Munich

Senior career*
Years	Team	Apps	(Gls)
2021–2023	1860 Munich II	27	(3)
2023–2024	1860 Munich	20	(3)
2024–2026	1. FC Köln	0	(0)
2024–2025	→ Jahn Regensburg (loan)	9	(0)
2025–2026	1. FC Köln II	14	(3)
2025–2026	→ VfB Stuttgart II (loan)	31	(9)
2026–	VfL Bochum	1	(0)
2026–	VfL Bochum II	1	(0)

International career^{‡}
2024–	Togo	4	(0)
- * Club domestic league appearances and goals as of 28 August 2026 ‡ National team caps and goals as of 16:03, 17 August 2025 (UTC)

Mansour Ouro-Tagba (born 17 December 2004) is a professional footballer who plays as a forward for 2. Bundesliga club VfL Bochum. Born in the United States, he plays for the Togo national team.

== Early life ==
Ouro-Tagba was born in New York City, and emigrated to Germany when he was three months old, growing up in Munich. His parents are from Togo.

== Club career ==
Ouro-Tagba came up through the youth system of 1860 Munich between 2014 and 2023. He made his debut for the reserve team during the 2021–22 Bayernliga season. His first match was against FC Gundelfingen on 15 September 2021. He finished the 2021–22 Bayernliga season with four appearances. He made his debut for first team during the 2022–23 season in a 2–0 loss against 1. FC Saarbrücken on 30 April 2023. On 12 June 2023, 1860 Munich announced they had extended the contract of Mansour Ouro-Tagba. He started the 2023–24 season with an appearance against 1. FC Stockheim in the Bavarian Cup.

On 14 June 2024, Ouro-Tagba signed for recently relegated 2. Bundesliga side 1. FC Köln on a long-term contract, immediately joining Jahn Regensburg on a season-long loan deal. On 10 January 2025, he returned from loan and was assigned to the reserve team 1. FC Köln II. On 9 August 2025, Ouro-Tagba was loaned by VfB Stuttgart II in 3. Liga, the reserve team of VfB Stuttgart.

On 10 August 2026, Oura-Tagba joined Bochum on a five-year contract.

== International career ==
Ouro-Tagba is eligible to play for the United States, Germany, and Togo. In January 2024, he received his first call-up to the Togo national team, but declined.

== Career statistics ==
=== Club ===
As of match played 28 August 2025

Appearances and goals by club, season and competition
Club	Season	League			DFB-Pokal		Total	
Club	Season	Division	Apps	Goals	Apps	Goals	Apps	Goals
1860 Munich II	2021–22	Bayernliga	4	0	—		4	0
1860 Munich II	2022–23	Bayernliga	5	0	—		5	0
1860 Munich II	2023–24	Bayernliga	18	3	—		18	3
1860 Munich II	Total		27	3	—		27	3
1860 Munich	2022–23	3. Liga	1	0	0	0	1	0
1860 Munich	2023–24	3. Liga	19	3	—		19	3
1860 Munich	Total		20	3	0	0	20	3
Jahn Regensburg (loan)	2024–25	2. Bundesliga	9	0	1	0	10	0
1. FC Köln II (loan)	2024–25	Regionalliga West	13	3	—		13	3
1. FC Köln II (loan)	2025–26	Regionalliga West	1	0	—		1	0
1. FC Köln II (loan)	Total		14	3	—		14	3
VfB Stuttgart II (loan)	2025–26	3. Liga	31	9	—		31	9
VfL Bochum	2026–27	2. Bundesliga	1	0	0	0	1	0
VfL Bochum II	2026–27	Regionalliga West	1	0	—		1	0
Career total			103	18	1	0	104	18

=== International ===
As of match played 10 October 2024

Appearances and goals by national team and year
National team	Year	Apps	Goals
Togo
Togo	2024	4	0
Total		4	0
