= Christoph Ehlich =

German footballer (born 1999)

Personal information
- Date of birth: 2 February 1999 (age 27)
- Place of birth: Ebersberg, Germany
- Height: 1.70 m (5 ft 7 in)
- Position: Right-back

Team information
- Current team: FSV Frankfurt
- Number: 3

Youth career
- –2014: 1860 Munich
- 2014–2018: SpVgg Unterhaching

Senior career*
Years	Team	Apps	(Gls)
2018–2023	SpVgg Unterhaching	96	(8)
2020	→ 1860 Rosenheim (loan)	1	(0)
2023–2025	SV Sandhausen	61	(3)
2026	SpVgg Unterhaching	12	(1)
2026–	FSV Frankfurt	8	(1)
- * Club domestic league appearances and goals as of 24 September 2026

Christoph Ehlich (born 2 February 1999) is a German professional footballer who plays as a right-back for FSV Frankfurt.

== Career ==
Ehlich made his professional debut for SpVgg Unterhaching in the 3. Liga on 6 April 2019, coming on as a substitute in the 70th minute for Hong Hyun-seok in the 4–0 away loss against Karlsruher SC. In January 2020, Ehlich joined Regionalliga Bayern side TSV 1860 Rosenheim on loan until the end of the season. He made only one appearance for Rosenheim.

== Career statistics ==
As of match played 28 January 2021

Appearances and goals by club, season and competition
Club	Season	League			National cup		Other			
Club	Season	Division	Apps	Goals	Apps	Goals	Apps	Goals	Apps	Goals
SpVgg Unterhaching	2018–19	3. Liga	4	0	0	0	—		4	0
SpVgg Unterhaching	2019–20	3. Liga	7	1	0	0	—		7	1
SpVgg Unterhaching	2020–21	3. Liga	12	0	0	0	—		12	0
SpVgg Unterhaching	2021–22	Regionalliga Bayern	35	4	0	0	—		35	4
SpVgg Unterhaching	2022–23	Regionalliga Bayern	36	3	0	0	2 (Note: Appearances in the Regionalliga promotion playoff)	0	38	3
SpVgg Unterhaching	Total		94	8	0	0	2	0	96	8
1860 Rosenheim (loan)	2019–21	Regionalliga Bayern	1	0	0	0	—		1	0
Career Total			95	8	0	0	2	0	97	8
