= Manfred Starke =

Namibian footballer (born 1991)

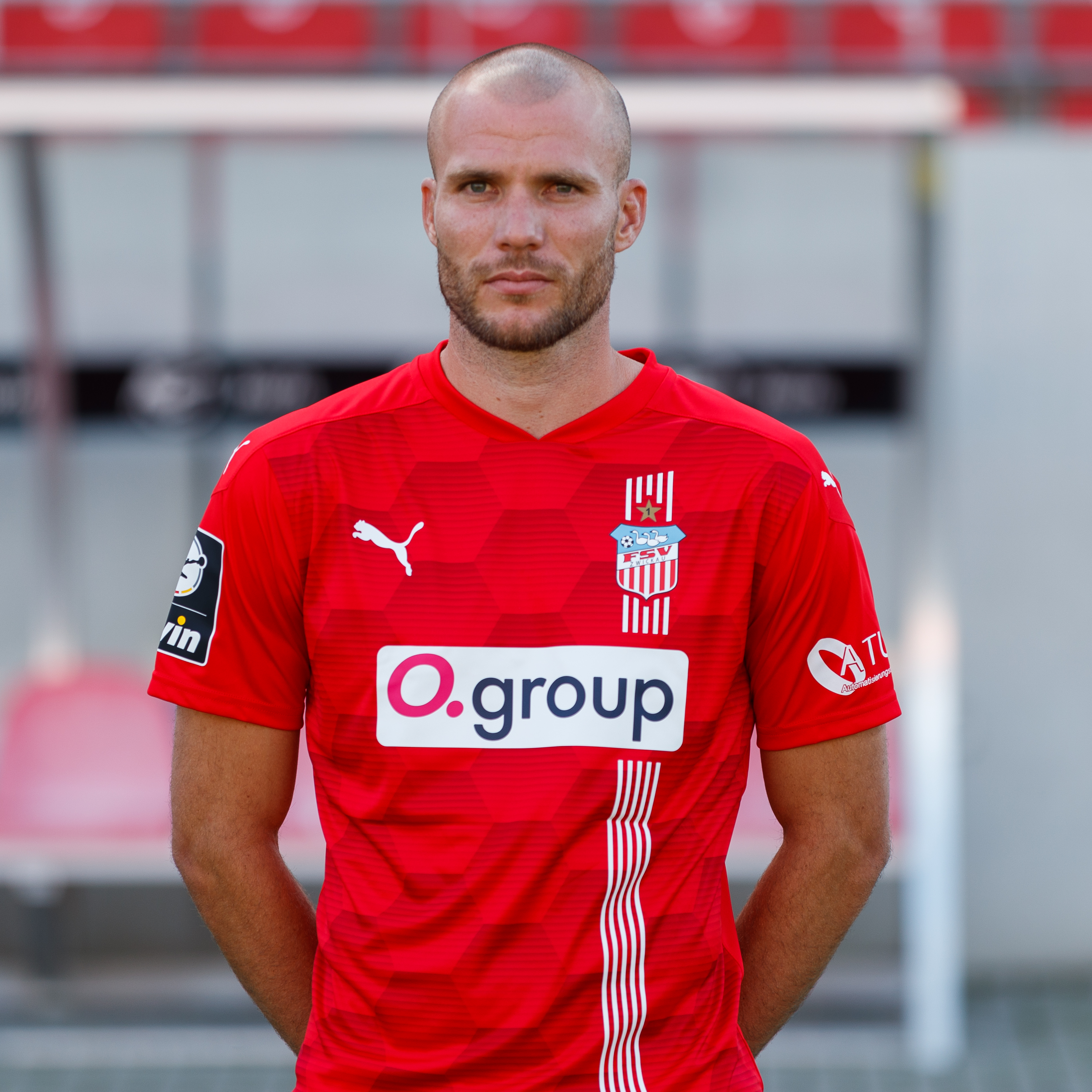
- Starke in 2021

Personal information
- Date of birth: 21 February 1991 (age 35)
- Place of birth: Windhoek, Namibia
- Height: 1.79 m (5 ft 10 in)
- Position: Attacking midfielder

Youth career
- 1998–2004: SK Windhoek
- 2004–2006: Hansa Rostock
- 2006–2007: FSV Bentwisch
- 2007–2010: Hansa Rostock

Senior career*
Years	Team	Apps	(Gls)
2012–2015	Hansa Rostock	49	(4)
2015–2019	Carl Zeiss Jena	122	(32)
2019–2020	1. FC Kaiserslautern	23	(1)
2020–2022	FSV Zwickau	64	(8)
2022–2023	VfB Oldenburg	36	(6)
2023–2024	TSV 1860 Munich	25	(1)

International career^{‡}
2012–	Namibia	7	(1)
- * Club domestic league appearances and goals as of 22 May 2024 ‡ National team caps and goals as of 28 March 2021

Manfred Starke (born 21 February 1991) is a Namibian professional footballer who plays as an attacking midfielder.

== Club career ==
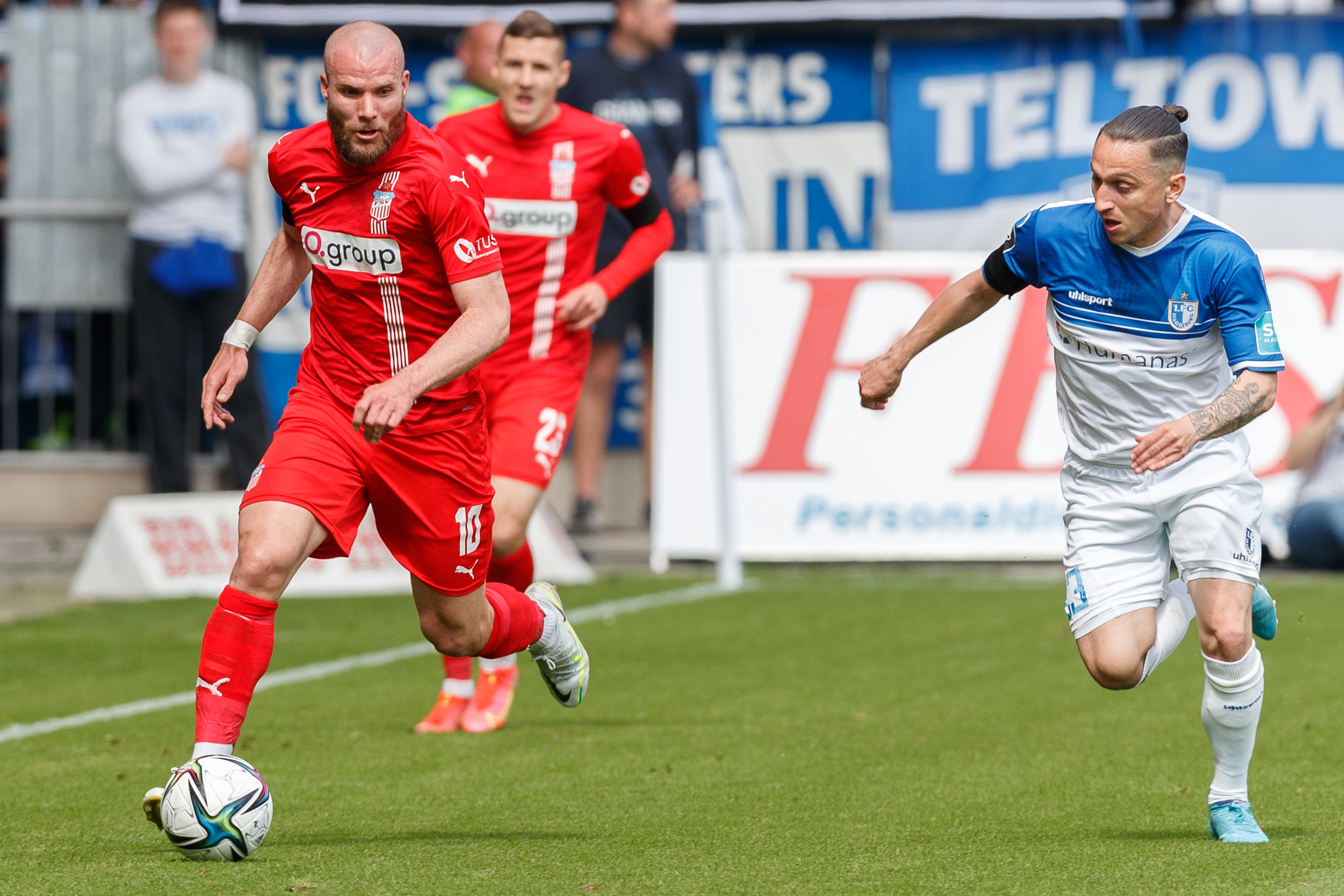
Starke playing for FSV Zwickau in 2022

Starke was born in Windhoek, Namibia to a Namibian-born German father and a Dutch mother. He began his professional career at FC Hansa Rostock. He is the older brother of Sandra Starke.

Starke moved to FSV Zwickau in 2020.

In July 2022, he signed with VfB Oldenburg, newly promoted to the 3. Liga.

In July 2023, Starke moved to TSV 1860 Munich, also in 3. Liga.

== International career ==
In October 2012, Starke made his debut for Namibia in a friendly against Rwanda. He played at 2019 Africa Cup of Nations, the country's first continental tournament in 11 years.
