= Len Worle =

Australian rules footballer

Personal information
- Full name: Leonard Victor Worle
- Born: 26 May 1889; Collingwood, Victoria
- Died: 10 October 1948 (aged 59); Fitzroy North, Victoria
- Original team: Brunswick

Playing career^{1}
Years	Club	Games (Goals)
1912	Essendon	4 (0)
- ^{1} Playing statistics correct to the end of 1912.

Leonard Victor Worle (26 May 1889 – 10 October 1948) was an Australian rules footballer who played with Essendon in the Victorian Football League (VFL).

== Family ==
One of five children, the son of Thomas Worle (1845-1915), and Eliza Worle (1857-1912), née Dennis, Leonard Victor Worle was born at Collingwood on 26 May 1889. His brother, Thomas Henry Worle (1885-1917), played for Collingwood.

He married Henrietta Bromley (1890-1982) in 1912.

== Military service ==
He enlisted in the First AIF, and served overseas with the 2nd Australian Field Artillery Brigade.

== Death ==
He died at North Fitzroy on 10 October 1948.
