= Tommy Worle =

Australian rules footballer

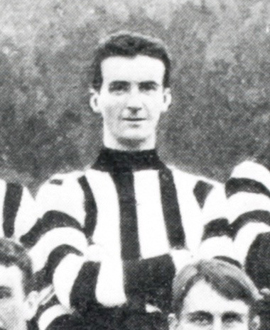
- Worle in 1907

Personal information
- Full name: Thomas Henry Worle
- Born: 21 January 1885; Collingwood, Victoria
- Died: 31 July 1917 (aged 32); Armentières, France
- Original team: Abbotsford

Playing career^{1}
Years	Club	Games (Goals)
1907	Collingwood	3 (0)
- ^{1} Playing statistics correct to the end of 1907.

Tommy Worle (21 January 1885 – 31 July 1917) was an Australian rules footballer who played with Collingwood in the Victorian Football League. He was killed in action, in France, in World War I.

== Family ==
One of five children, the son of Thomas Worle (1845–1915), and Eliza Worle (1857–1912), née Dennis, Thomas Henry Worle was born at Collingwood on 21 January 1885. His brother, Leonard Victor Worle (1889–1948) played for Essendon.

He married Elsie Maud Courtis in 1912; his brother-in-law, Harry Courtis, was killed in action on 20 May 1915.

== Football ==
=== Collingwood ===
He played three games for the Collingwood First XVIII in 1907.

=== Brunswick ===
He was cleared from Collingwood, where he had been playing in the Reserves during the 1908 season, to Brunswick (VFA) in 1909.

=== Collingwood District Football Club ===
In April 1910, he was cleared from Brunswick to play for the Collingwood District Football Club in the Metropolitan Junior Football Association.

=== Alphington ===
In 1914 he was playing for his local team, Alphington, in the Heidelberg District Football League. He played in both 1914 and 1915.

== Military service ==
He enlisted in the First AIF in January 1916.

== Death ==
He was killed in action near Armentières, in northern France on 31 July 1917.

== See also ==
- List of Victorian Football League players who died on active service

== Sources ==
- Holmesby, Russell & Main, Jim (2007). The Encyclopedia of AFL Footballers. 7th ed. Melbourne: Bas Publishing.
- Main, J. & Allen, D., "Worle, Tom", p. 197 in Main, J. & Allen, D., Fallen – The Ultimate Heroes: Footballers Who Never Returned From War, Crown Content, (Melbourne), 2002. ISBN 1-74095-010-0
- Australia's Roll of Honor: 335th Casualty List: Victoria: Killed in Action, The Age, (Tuesday, 4 September 1917), p.6.
- World War I Service Record: Thomas Henry Worle (20034). National Archives of Australia.
- Australia's Roll of Honor: 335th Casualty List: Victoria: Killed in Action: "Worle, Sgt. T.H., Northcote", The Age, (Tuesday, 4 September 1917), p.6.
- Roll of Honour: Sergeant Thomas Henry Worle (20034), Australian War Memorial.
- McFarlane, G., "Tommy Worle 1907 (Biography)", Collingwood Forever.
