= Maurizio Jacobacci =

Swiss footballer and manager (born 1963)

Personal information
- Date of birth: 11 January 1963 (age 63)
- Place of birth: Bern, Switzerland
- Height: 1.70 m (5 ft 7 in)
- Position: Forward

Senior career*
Years	Team	Apps	(Gls)
1978–1983	Young Boys		
1982	→ FC Bern (loan)		
1983–1984	Vevey-Sports		
1984–1987	Neuchâtel Xamax		
1987–1989	Bellinzona		
1989–1990	FC Wettingen		
1990–1992	Servette		
1992–1993	St. Gallen		
1993–1994	Lausanne-Sport		
1994–1995	Bellinzona		

Managerial career
- 1997–1999: FC Mendrisio
- 1999–2000: Chiasso
- 2003–2004: SR Delémont
- 2005: FC Baden
- 2005–2006: FC Wil 1900
- 2006–2007: FC Vaduz
- 2007–2008: FC Sion
- 2008–2011: SC Kriens
- 2011–2016: FC Schaffhausen
- 2016–2017: FC Wacker Innsbruck
- 2017: FC Wil
- 2017–2018: FC Sion (U21)
- 2018: FC Sion
- 2019: Bellinzona
- 2019–2021: Lugano
- 2021: Grenoble
- 2022–2023: CS Sfaxien
- 2023: 1860 Munich
- 2026–: Kispest Honvéd
- * Club domestic league appearances and goals

Maurizio Jacobacci (born 11 January 1963 in Bern) is a Swiss professional football manager and former player.

== Playing career ==
As a player, Jacobacci was a pacy winger who played over 300 games in the top Swiss league for eight different clubs. After starting out in the neighbourhood clubs Bethlehem and Bümpliz, he made the step up to the city's most important football club, Young Boys (YB), where he made the leap to the 1st team in 1978 and was active in it for five years. He won the Swiss championship 1987 with Neuchâtel Xamax. For Xamax he scored in a 2–0 victory in a UEFA Cup quarterfinal home victory against Real Madrid.

== Managerial career ==
Right at the end of his playing career in 1995, Jacobacci started his coaching career at the amateur level team of AS Origlio. For the next two decades, Jacobacci was head coach in lower league teams with a stint as assistant coach at Grasshoppers from 2000 to 2003 where he helped the team to win the Swiss championship twice. After a first short spell as head coach at Super League club FC Sion in 2007–08, he was able to work for a longer time successfully at SC Kriens and FC Schaffhausen. With the latter club he managed to achieve two promotions in a row from the 4th to the 2nd tier of Swiss football. 2016 saw his first job abroad at Wacker Innsbruck. After four more engagements in Switzerland at FC Wil, a second tme at FC Sion, then Bellinzona and Lugano, he coached Grenoble in France, CS Sfaxien in Tunisia and 1860 Munich in Germany. 1860 Munich started the 2023–24 season with a win against 1. FC Stockheim in the Bavarian Cup. He was sacked in December 2023. On 6 June 2026, he was appointed as the coach of Nemzeti Bajnokság I club Kispest Honvéd FC.

== Personal life ==
The son of Italian immigrants, Jacobacci grew up in the Swiss federal city of Bern. He has two children and three grandchildren. His partner Ilona Hug is the ex-wife of K-1 world champion Andy Hug.
