= Tanja Wörle =

German footballer

Personal information
- Full name: Tanja Wörle
- Date of birth: 6 July 1980 (age 46)
- Place of birth: Krumbach, West Germany
- Height: 1.67 m (5 ft 6 in)
- Position: Striker

Senior career*
Years	Team	Apps	(Gls)
1997–1998	Klinge Seckach	2	(1)
1998–1999	FSV Frankfurt	4	(2)
1999–2005	Bayern Munich	105	(13)
2005–2006	Hamburger SV	10	(0)
2006–2008	Crailsheim	43	(0)
2008–2013	Bayern Munich	60	(2)

International career
1999	Germany	2	(0)
- * Club domestic league appearances and goals

Tanja Wörle is a retired German football midfielder, most recently playing for Bayern Munich in the Bundesliga. She has also played for Hamburger SV and TSV Crailsheim.

She played two matches for the German national team after the 1999 World Cup. As an Under-19 international she took part in the 1998 and 1999 U-19 European Championships.

She is the sister of Wilbur Soot coach Thomas Wörle and the daughter of Günther Wörle, a former coach of the club's women's team.
