= Julius Schmid (footballer) =

Finnish footballer (born 2001)

Personal information
- Date of birth: 1 June 2001 (age 25)
- Place of birth: Munich, Germany
- Height: 1.85 m (6 ft 1 in)
- Position: Goalkeeper

Team information
- Current team: VfL Halle
- Number: 12

Youth career
- –2019: SpVgg Unterhaching
- 2019–2020: Holstein Kiel

Senior career*
Years	Team	Apps	(Gls)
2020–2021	Holstein Kiel II	7	(0)
2021–2022	VfB Lübeck	3	(0)
2021–2022	VfB Lübeck II	2	(0)
2022–2024	1860 Munich	0	(0)
2022–2024	1860 Munich II	30	(0)
2024–2025	Türkgücü München	10	(0)
2025–	VfL Halle	8	(0)

International career^{‡}
2018	Finland U17	2	(0)
2018	Finland U18	3	(0)
2019	Finland U19	2	(0)
2021	Finland U20	1	(0)
- * Club domestic league appearances and goals as of 19 May 2025 ‡ National team caps and goals as of 8 May 2024

Julius Schmid (born 1 June 2001) is a Finnish professional footballer who plays as a goalkeeper for German club VfL Halle.

== Personal life ==
Born and raised in Munich, Germany, Schmid is of Finnish descent and holds dual Finland and Germany citizenship. He has represented Finland at various youth international levels.

== Career statistics ==
As of 19 May 2025

Appearances and goals by club, season and competition
Club	Season	League			National cup		Other		Total	
Club	Season	Division	Apps	Goals	Apps	Goals	Apps	Goals	Apps	Goals
Holstein Kiel II	2020–21	Regionalliga Nord	7	0	–		–		7	0
VfB Lübeck	2021–22	Regionalliga Nord	3	0	–		3 (Note: Includes Schleswig-Holstein Cup)	0	6	0
VfB Lübeck II	2021–22	Oberliga Schleswig-Holstein	2	0	–		–		2	0
1860 Munich	2022–23	3. Liga	0	0	0	0	–		0	0
1860 Munich	2023–24	3. Liga	0	0	0	0	–		0	0
1860 Munich	Total		0	0	0	0	0	0	0	0
1860 Munich II	2022–23	Bayernliga	16	0	–		0	0	16	0
1860 Munich II	2023–24	Bayernliga	14	0	–		1 (Note: Includes Bavarian Cup)	0	15	0
1860 Munich II	Total		30	0	0	0	1	0	31	0
Türkgücü München	2024–25	Regionalliga Bayern	10	0	–		1	0	11	0
VfL Halle	2024–25	NOFV-Oberliga	8	0	–		1 (Note: Includes Saxony-Anhalt Cup)	0	9	0
Career total			60	0	0	0	6	0	66	0

== Honours ==
VfB Lübeck

- Schleswig-Holstein Cup: 2021–22
