= 2022–23 Regionalliga =

15th season of the Regionalliga

Regionalliga
- Season: 2022–23
- Champions: VfB Lübeck (Nord); Energie Cottbus (Nordost); Preußen Münster (West); SSV Ulm (Südwest); SpVgg Unterhaching (Bayern)
- Promoted: VfB Lübeck; Preußen Münster; SSV Ulm; SpVgg Unterhaching
- Relegated: Werder Bremen II; Schwarz-Weiß Rehden; VfV Hildesheim; Atlas Delmenhorst; Kickers Emden; SV Lichtenberg; Germania Halberstadt; Tennis Borussia Berlin; SG Wattenscheid; SV Straelen; Wormatia Worms; Rot-Weiß Koblenz; Eintracht Trier; VfB Eichstätt; TSV Rain am Lech; SpVgg Hankofen-Hailing; SV Heimstetten; FC Pipinsried
- Withdrawn: 1. FC Kaan-Marienborn

The 2022–23 Regionalliga was the 15th season of the Regionalliga, the eleventh under the new format, as the fourth tier of the German football league system.

== Format ==
According to the promotion rules decided upon in 2019, the Regionalliga Südwest and West received a direct promotion spot. Based on a rotation principle, the Regionalliga Nord also received the third direct promotion spot this season, while the Regionalliga Nordost and Bayern champions will play a promotion play-off.

== Regionalliga Nord ==
19 teams from the states of Bremen, Hamburg, Lower Saxony and Schleswig-Holstein compete in the eleventh season of the reformed Regionalliga Nord. TSV Havelse was relegated from the 2021–22 3. Liga. Blau-Weiß Lohne and Kickers Emden were promoted from the 2021–22 Oberliga Niedersachsen and Bremer SV was promoted from the 2021–22 Bremen-Liga.

The league was not split this season, returning to the format from the 2019–20 season.

Pos	Team	Pld	W	D	L	GF	GA	GD	Pts	Promotion, qualification or relegation
1	VfB Lübeck (C, P)	36	23	7	6	74	29	+45	76	Promotion to 3. Liga
2	Hamburger SV II	36	22	9	5	78	45	+33	75	
3	Hannover 96 II	36	21	4	11	81	54	+27	67	
4	Teutonia Ottensen	36	17	7	12	63	57	+6	58	
5	Weiche Flensburg	36	16	8	12	55	47	+8	56	
6	TSV Havelse	36	15	10	11	54	47	+7	52 (Note: TSV Havelse and SSV Jeddeloh were deducted 3 points each for failing to pay their association fees on time.)	
7	FC St. Pauli II	36	15	6	15	58	68	−10	51	
8	SV Drochtersen/Assel	36	14	8	14	55	44	+11	50	
9	Blau-Weiß Lohne	36	15	4	17	65	63	+2	49	
10	Eintracht Norderstedt	36	12	12	12	55	49	+6	48	
11	SSV Jeddeloh	36	14	9	13	58	63	−5	48	
12	Holstein Kiel II	36	12	11	13	61	57	+4	47	
13	Phönix Lübeck	36	12	11	13	59	55	+4	47	
14	Bremer SV (O)	36	13	7	16	51	56	−5	46	Qualification for relegation play-offs
15	Werder Bremen II (R)	36	13	6	17	57	61	−4	45	Relegation to Oberliga
16	Schwarz-Weiß Rehden (R)	36	10	11	15	44	56	−12	41	Relegation to Oberliga
17	VfV Hildesheim (R)	36	9	12	15	53	64	−11	39	Relegation to Oberliga
18	Atlas Delmenhorst (R)	36	8	8	20	53	82	−29	32	Relegation to Oberliga
19	Kickers Emden (R)	36	3	6	27	26	103	−77	15	Relegation to Oberliga

Source: kicker.de
Rules for classification: 1) Points; 2) Goal difference; 3) Goals scored
(C) Champions; (O) Play-off winners; (P) Promoted; (R) Relegated

=== Top scorers ===
Rank	Player	Club	Goals
1	(Germany) Moritz Göttel	VfV Hildesheim	24
2	(Burkina Faso) Daouda Beleme	Hamburger SV II	17
3	(Germany) Lars Gindorf	Hannover 96 II	15
3	(Poland) Maik Łukowicz	Teutonia Ottensen	15
5	(Germany) Felix Drinkuth	VfB Lübeck	14
5	(Germany) Julian Ulbricht	Phönix Lübeck; FC St. Pauli II	14

=== Relegation play-offs ===
Team 1	Agg.	Team 2	1st leg	2nd leg
Lupo Martini Wolfsburg	1–2	Bremer SV	0–0	1–2

== Regionalliga Nordost ==
18 teams from the states of Berlin, Brandenburg, Mecklenburg-Vorpommern, Saxony, Saxony-Anhalt and Thuringia compete in the eleventh season of the reformed Regionalliga Nordost. Viktoria Berlin was relegated from the 2021–22 3. Liga. Greifswalder FC was promoted from the 2021–22 NOFV-Oberliga Nord and Rot-Weiß Erfurt was promoted from the 2021–22 NOFV-Oberliga Süd.

Pos	Team	Pld	W	D	L	GF	GA	GD	Pts	Qualification or relegation
1	Energie Cottbus (C)	34	21	7	6	65	28	+37	70	Qualification for promotion play-offs
2	Carl Zeiss Jena	34	17	12	5	59	22	+37	63	
3	Rot-Weiß Erfurt	34	18	9	7	63	32	+31	63	
4	Lokomotive Leipzig	34	18	6	10	60	42	+18	60	
5	VSG Altglienicke	34	17	8	9	66	37	+29	59	
6	BFC Dynamo	34	15	11	8	58	45	+13	56	
7	Chemie Leipzig	34	14	11	9	50	45	+5	53	
8	Chemnitzer FC	34	14	10	10	47	33	+14	52	
9	Hertha BSC II	34	15	7	12	59	52	+7	52	
10	SV Babelsberg	34	13	10	11	46	41	+5	49	
11	Berliner AK	34	15	4	15	48	54	−6	49	
12	Viktoria Berlin	34	12	9	13	46	47	−1	45	
13	FSV Luckenwalde	34	11	11	12	45	51	−6	44	
14	Greifswalder FC	34	10	7	17	47	61	−14	37	
15	ZFC Meuselwitz	34	11	2	21	51	67	−16	35	
16	SV Lichtenberg (R)	34	5	12	17	37	69	−32	27	Relegation to NOFV-Oberliga
17	Germania Halberstadt (R)	34	2	10	22	29	75	−46	16	Relegation to NOFV-Oberliga
18	Tennis Borussia Berlin (R)	34	3	4	27	27	102	−75	13	Relegation to NOFV-Oberliga

Source: kicker.de
Rules for classification: 1) Points; 2) Goal difference; 3) Goals scored
(C) Champions; (R) Relegated

=== Top scorers ===
Rank	Player	Club	Goals
1	(Germany) Djamal Ziane	Lokomotive Leipzig	18
2	(Germany) Christian Beck	BFC Dynamo	16
3	(Turkey) Tolcay Ciğerci	VSG Altglienicke	14
4	(Germany) Artur Mergel	Rot-Weiß Erfurt	13
5	(Germany) Osman Atılgan	Lokomotive Leipzig	12
5	(Germany) Daniel Frahn	SV Babelsberg	12
5	(Germany) Sascha Pfeffer	Lokomotive Leipzig	12
5	(Germany) Kay Seidemann	Rot-Weiß Erfurt	12
5	(Germany) Nicolas Wähling	Energie Cottbus	12

== Regionalliga West ==
18 teams from North Rhine-Westphalia compete in the eleventh season of the reformed Regionalliga West. 1. FC Düren was promoted from the 2021–22 Mittelrheinliga, 1. FC Bocholt was promoted from the 2021–22 Oberliga Niederrhein and 1. FC Kaan-Marienborn and SG Wattenscheid were promoted from the 2021–22 Oberliga Westfalen.

Prior to the season, the Westphalian Football and Athletics Association permanently abolished the DFB-Pokal play-off between the champions of the Oberliga Westfalen and the best-placed Westphalian team from the Regionalliga West. From this season onwards, the DFB-Pokal spot will alternate between the two aforementioned teams, starting with the Regionalliga West team.

Pos	Team	Pld	W	D	L	GF	GA	GD	Pts	Promotion, qualification or relegation
1	Preußen Münster (C, P)	34	25	4	5	89	39	+50	79	Promotion to 3. Liga and qualification for DFB-Pokal
2	Wuppertaler SV	34	19	9	6	77	47	+30	66	
3	Borussia Mönchengladbach II	34	19	9	6	73	47	+26	66	
4	SV Rödinghausen	34	17	7	10	59	35	+24	58	
5	1. FC Kaan-Marienborn	34	16	7	11	59	54	+5	55	Withdrawal (Note: 1. FC Kaan-Marienborn withdrew their senior team after this season due to not being able to fulfill future stadium requirements. Their reserve team, currently playing in the eleventh-tier Kreisliga C, will function as their new senior team from the 2023–24 season onwards. Due to this decision, only two teams (three if a 3. Liga team is relegated to the Regionalliga West) will be relegated to the Oberliga.)
6	Fortuna Köln	34	15	9	10	48	43	+5	54	
7	Rot-Weiß Oberhausen	34	15	8	11	61	51	+10	53	
8	Alemannia Aachen	34	15	8	11	50	43	+7	53	
9	Schalke 04 II	34	13	10	11	65	53	+12	49	
10	1. FC Düren	34	14	6	14	51	56	−5	48	
11	SV Lippstadt	34	13	7	14	51	56	−5	46	
12	SC Wiedenbrück	34	11	8	15	50	47	+3	41	
13	Fortuna Düsseldorf II	34	11	6	17	50	64	−14	39	
14	1. FC Köln II	34	10	8	16	45	62	−17	38	
15	1. FC Bocholt	34	9	9	16	49	70	−21	36	
16	Rot Weiss Ahlen	34	8	5	21	53	82	−29	29	
17	SG Wattenscheid (R)	34	8	3	23	45	90	−45	27	Relegation to Oberliga
18	SV Straelen (R)	34	4	5	25	31	67	−36	17	Relegation to Oberliga

Source: kicker.de
Rules for classification: 1) Points; 2) Goal difference; 3) Goals scored
(C) Champions; (P) Promoted; (R) Relegated

=== Top scorers ===
Rank	Player	Club	Goals
1	(Germany) Serhat Semih Güler	Wuppertaler SV	23
2	(Germany) Gerrit Wegkamp	Preußen Münster	22
3	(Germany) Sven Kreyer	Rot-Weiß Oberhausen	18
4	(Germany) Anton Heinz	Rot-Weiß Oberhausen	17
5	(United States) Andrew Wooten	Preußen Münster	16

== Regionalliga Südwest ==
18 teams from Baden-Württemberg, Hesse, Rhineland-Palatinate and Saarland compete in the eleventh season of the Regionalliga Südwest. Wormatia Worms and Eintracht Trier were promoted from the 2021–22 Oberliga Rheinland-Pfalz/Saar, SGV Freiberg was promoted from the 2021–22 Oberliga Baden-Württemberg and Barockstadt Fulda-Lehnerz was promoted from the 2021–22 Hessenliga.

Pos	Team	Pld	W	D	L	GF	GA	GD	Pts	Promotion or relegation
1	SSV Ulm (C, P)	34	21	9	4	59	25	+34	72	Promotion to 3. Liga
2	TSV Steinbach Haiger	34	21	8	5	80	31	+49	71	
3	1899 Hoffenheim II	34	21	6	7	80	38	+42	69	
4	FC 08 Homburg	34	16	10	8	65	44	+21	58	
5	FSV Frankfurt	34	17	6	11	57	45	+12	57	
6	TSG Balingen	34	15	11	8	51	44	+7	56	
7	Kickers Offenbach	34	16	7	11	48	38	+10	55	
8	VfB Stuttgart II	34	14	10	10	53	39	+14	52	
9	Mainz 05 II	34	13	9	12	50	47	+3	48	
10	Bahlinger SC	34	14	4	16	53	67	−14	46	
11	Barockstadt Fulda-Lehnerz	34	9	13	12	47	50	−3	40	
12	Astoria Walldorf	34	8	10	16	43	64	−21	34	
13	Hessen Kassel	34	8	9	17	34	51	−17	33	
14	SGV Freiberg	34	8	9	17	41	68	−27	33	
15	VfR Aalen	34	11	8	15	38	52	−14	32 (Note: VfR Aalen were deducted 9 points for filing for insolvency.)	
16	Wormatia Worms (R)	34	7	8	19	37	63	−26	29	Relegation to Oberliga
17	Rot-Weiß Koblenz (R)	34	7	6	21	35	67	−32	27	Relegation to Oberliga
18	Eintracht Trier (R)	34	5	7	22	32	70	−38	22	Relegation to Oberliga

Source: kicker.de
Rules for classification: 1) Points; 2) Goal difference; 3) Goals scored; 4) Head-to-head points; 5) Head-to-head goal difference; 6) Head-to-head goals scored; 7) Head-to-head away goals scored; 8) Away goals scored; 9) Play-off (only when deciding promotion or relegation)
(C) Champions; (P) Promoted; (R) Relegated

=== Top scorers ===
Rank	Player	Club	Goals
1	(Netherlands) Cas Peters	FSV Frankfurt	22
2	(Germany) Fisnik Asllani	1899 Hoffenheim II	14
3	(Germany) Niklas Antlitz	Astoria Walldorf	13
3	(Germany) Fabian Eisele	FC 08 Homburg	13
3	(Germany) Lucas Röser	SSV Ulm	13

== Regionalliga Bayern ==
20 teams from Bavaria compete in the tenth season of the Regionalliga Bayern. Würzburger Kickers and Türkgücü München were relegated from the 2021–22 3. Liga. DJK Vilzing and SpVgg Ansbach were promoted from the 2021–22 Bayernliga Nord and SpVgg Hankofen-Hailing was promoted from the 2021–22 Bayernliga Süd.

Pos	Team	Pld	W	D	L	GF	GA	GD	Pts	Qualification or relegation
1	SpVgg Unterhaching (C, O, P)	38	27	5	6	86	33	+53	86	Qualification for promotion play-offs and DFB-Pokal
2	Würzburger Kickers	38	24	8	6	103	36	+67	80	
3	Bayern Munich II (Note: Reserve teams are ineligible for qualification for the DFB-Pokal.)	38	21	8	9	94	54	+40	71	
4	1. FC Nürnberg II	38	18	7	13	81	55	+26	61	
5	Viktoria Aschaffenburg	38	16	13	9	63	47	+16	61	
6	1. FC Schweinfurt	38	17	8	13	77	64	+13	59	
7	Wacker Burghausen	38	16	8	14	57	45	+12	56	
8	Greuther Fürth II	38	16	7	15	51	53	−2	55	
9	FV Illertissen	38	15	10	13	60	65	−5	55	
10	FC Augsburg II	38	16	6	16	78	69	+9	54	
11	TSV Aubstadt	38	15	9	14	65	59	+6	54	
12	TSV Buchbach	38	14	11	13	62	68	−6	53	
13	DJK Vilzing	38	14	9	15	52	68	−16	51	
14	Türkgücü München	38	14	8	16	48	51	−3	50	
15	SpVgg Ansbach (O)	38	14	8	16	57	66	−9	50	Qualification for relegation play-offs
16	VfB Eichstätt (R)	38	13	4	21	64	70	−6	43	Qualification for relegation play-offs
17	TSV Rain am Lech (R)	38	9	9	20	40	78	−38	36	Relegation to Bayernliga
18	SpVgg Hankofen-Hailing (R)	38	10	6	22	47	90	−43	36	Relegation to Bayernliga
19	SV Heimstetten (R)	38	6	7	25	43	94	−51	25	Relegation to Bayernliga
20	FC Pipinsried (R)	38	6	7	25	37	100	−63	25	Relegation to Bayernliga

Source: kicker.de
Rules for classification: 1) Points; 2) Goal difference; 3) Goals scored
(C) Champions; (O) Play-off winners; (P) Promoted; (R) Relegated

=== Top scorers ===
Rank	Player	Club	Goals
1	(Germany) Patrick Hobsch	SpVgg Unterhaching	27
2	(Germany) Adam Jabiri	1. FC Schweinfurt	22
2	(Croatia) Leonardo Vonić	1. FC Nürnberg II	22
4	(Germany) Saliou Sané	Würzburger Kickers	21
5	(Germany) Andreas Jünger	DJK Vilzing	20
5	(Armenia) Grant-Leon Ranos	Bayern Munich II	20

=== Relegation play-offs ===
Since SpVgg Unterhaching won the promotion play-offs, two spots were available in the next Regionalliga Bayern season, which went to the two winners of the first round. Had Unterhaching lost the promotion play-offs, only one spot would have been available, requiring a second play-off round between the winners of the first round. To avoid waiting times, the participating clubs had agreed to play the second round regardless of Unterhaching's performance in the promotion play-offs.

==== First round ====
Team 1	Agg.	Team 2	1st leg	2nd leg
DJK Gebenbach	2–6	SpVgg Ansbach	1–4	1–2
FC Memmingen	4–2	VfB Eichstätt	0–1	4–1

==== Second round ====
Team 1	Agg.	Team 2	1st leg	2nd leg
FC Memmingen	4–2	SpVgg Ansbach	1–1	3–1

== Promotion play-offs ==
The order of the legs was determined in a draw. The matches were originally scheduled to take place on 1 and 5 June 2023. However, since Energie Cottbus qualified for the final of the 2022–23 Brandenburg Cup, the matches were rescheduled to 7 and 11 June.

Team 1	Agg.	Team 2	1st leg	2nd leg
Energie Cottbus	1–4	SpVgg Unterhaching	1–2	0–2

All times Central European Summer Time (UTC+2)

7 June 2023
20:30

Energie Cottbus	1–2	SpVgg Unterhaching
Hildebrandt 14'	Report	Anspach 6'; Fetsch 36'

Stadion der Freundschaft, Cottbus
Attendance: 17,580
Referee: Timo Gerach
11 June 2023
13:00

SpVgg Unterhaching	2–0	Energie Cottbus
Fetsch 17'; Ehlich 90+3'	Report

Alpenbauer Sportpark, Unterhaching
Attendance: 12,500
Referee: Tobias Reichel
