= 2023–24 1. FSV Mainz 05 season =

Mainz 05
2023–24 season
- President: Stefan Hofmann
- Head coach: Bo Svensson (until 2 November); Jan Siewert (from 2 November to 12 February); Bo Henriksen (from 13 February)
- Stadium: Mewa Arena
- Bundesliga: 13th
- DFB-Pokal: Second round
- Top goalscorer: League: Jonathan Burkardt (8); All: Jonathan Burkardt (8)
- Biggest win: Mainz 05 4–0 Darmstadt 98
- Biggest defeat: Bayern Munich 8–1 Mainz 05
Home colours	Away colours	Third colours

The 2023–24 season was 1. FSV Mainz 05's 119th season in existence and 15th consecutive season in the Bundesliga. They also competed in the DFB-Pokal.

== Players ==
=== First-team squad ===
As of 1 February 2024

No.	Pos.	Nation	Player
1	GK	GER	Lasse Rieß
2	DF	AUT	Phillipp Mwene
3	DF	NED	Sepp van den Berg (on loan from Liverpool)
5	DF	GER	Maxim Leitsch
7	MF	KOR	Lee Jae-sung
8	MF	LUX	Leandro Barreiro
9	FW	AUT	Karim Onisiwo
10	FW	GER	Marco Richter
11	FW	GER	Jessic Ngankam (on loan from Eintracht Frankfurt)
14	MF	GER	Tom Krauß
16	DF	GER	Stefan Bell
17	FW	FRA	Ludovic Ajorque
18	MF	GER	Nadiem Amiri
19	DF	FRA	Anthony Caci

No.	Pos.	Nation	Player
20	MF	SUI	Edimilson Fernandes
21	DF	GER	Danny da Costa
23	MF	FRA	Josuha Guilavogui
24	MF	GER	Merveille Papela
25	DF	NOR	Andreas Hanche-Olsen
27	GK	GER	Robin Zentner (vice-captain)
29	FW	GER	Jonathan Burkardt
30	DF	SUI	Silvan Widmer (captain)
31	MF	GER	Dominik Kohr
33	GK	GER	Daniel Batz
41	MF	ALB	Eniss Shabani
43	FW	GER	Brajan Gruda
44	FW	GER	Nelson Weiper

=== Out on loan ===
Note: Flags indicate national team as defined under FIFA eligibility rules; some limited exceptions apply. Players may hold more than one non-FIFA nationality.

No.	Pos.	Nation	Player
—	DF	GER	Lucas Laux (at (Germany) SV Sandhausen until 30 June 2024)
—	MF	MAR	Aymen Barkok (at (Germany) Hertha BSC until 30 June 2024)
—	MF	GER	Paul Nebel (at (Germany) Karlsruher SC until 30 June 2024)

No.	Pos.	Nation	Player
—	MF	GER	Niklas Tauer (at (Germany) Eintracht Braunschweig until 30 June 2024)
—	FW	GER	Ben Bobzien (at Austria Lustenau until 30 June 2024)
—	FW	NED	Delano Burgzorg (at (England) Huddersfield Town until 30 June 2024)

== Transfers ==
=== In ===
Pos.	Player	Transferred from	Fee	Date	Source
DF	(Netherlands) Sepp van den Berg	(England) Liverpool	Loan	13 July 2023	
MF	(Germany) Tom Krauß	(Germany) RB Leipzig	€5,000,000	14 July 2023	
MF	(Germany) Marco Richter	(Germany) Hertha BSC	€3,000,000	22 August 2023	
DF	(Austria) Phillipp Mwene	(Netherlands) PSV Eindhoven	€1,000,000	23 August 2023	
MF	(Netherlands) Anwar El Ghazi	Unattached	Free	22 September 2023	
MF	(France) Josuha Guilavogui	Unattached	Free	25 September 2023	

=== Out ===
Pos.	Player	Transferred to	Fee	Date	Source
MF	(France) Angelo Fulgini	(France) Lens	€7,200,000	1 July 2023	
DF	(Spain) Aarón Martín	(Italy) Genoa	Free	3 July 2023	
FW	(Denmark) Marcus Ingvartsen	(Denmark) Nordsjælland	€3,000,000	7 July 2023	
FW	(Austria) Marlon Mustapha	(Italy) Como	€900,000	12 July 2023	
DF	(Germany) Alexander Hack	(Saudi Arabia) Al Qadsiah	€1,500,000	14 August 2023	
MF	(Netherlands) Anwar El Ghazi	Released		3 November 2023	

== Pre-season and friendlies ==
Win Draw Loss

14 July 2023 Friendly	TuS Koblenz	1–6	Mainz 05	Koblenz
17:00 UTC+2	Sawaneh 2'	Report	Barkok 5'; Mamutovic 7'; Ajorque 17' (pen.), 39'; Gruda 43'; Burgzorg 74'	Stadium: Stadion Oberwerth; Attendance: 2,293

1 August 2023 Friendly	Mainz 05	4–1	St. Gallen	Salzburg, Austria
16:00 UTC+2				Stadium: 28 BLACK ARENA-Nonntal

5 August 2023 Friendly	Mainz 05	1–0	Burnley	Mainz
15:30 UTC+2	Caci 42'			Stadium: Mewa Arena

9 September 2023 Friendly	Mainz 05	2–0	MSV Duisburg	Mainz
15:30 UTC+2	Krauß 1' (pen.), 64' (pen.)			Stadium: Bruchwegstadion

14 October 2023 Friendly	Rhein-Ahr-Auswahl	0–13	Mainz 05	Adenau
		Report	Richter 7', 15', 34', 48'; Kohr 19'; Papela 24', 85', 87'; Barkok 25'; Guilavogui 27', 89'; Ajorque 58', 83'	Stadium: Eiffelstadion; Attendance: 2,500

== Competitions ==
=== Overall record ===
Competition	First match	Last match	Starting round	Final position	Record							
Competition	First match	Last match	Starting round	Final position	Pld	W	D	L	GF	GA	GD	Win %
Bundesliga	20 August 2023	18 May 2024	Matchday 1	13th	34	7	14	13	39	51	−12	20.59
DFB-Pokal	12 August 2023	1 November 2023	First round	Second round	2	1	0	1	1	3	−2	50.00
Total					36	8	14	14	40	54	−14	22.22

Source: Soccerway

=== Bundesliga ===
==== League table ====
Pos	Team	Pld	W	D	L	GF	GA	GD	Pts
11	FC Augsburg	34	10	9	15	50	60	−10	39
12	VfL Wolfsburg	34	10	7	17	41	56	−15	37
13	Mainz 05	34	7	14	13	39	51	−12	35
14	Borussia Mönchengladbach	34	7	13	14	56	67	−11	34
15	Union Berlin	34	9	6	19	33	58	−25	33

Source: DFB
Rules for classification: 1) Points; 2) Goal difference; 3) Goals scored; 4) Head-to-head results; 5) Head-to-head away goals scored; 6) Away goals scored; 7) Play-off.

==== Results summary ====
Overall								Home						Away					
Pld	W	D	L	GF	GA	GD	Pts	W	D	L	GF	GA	GD	W	D	L	GF	GA	GD
34	7	14	13	39	51	−12	35	6	5	6	23	18	+5	1	9	7	16	33	−17

Source: DFB

==== Results by round ====
Round	1	2	3	4	5	6	7	8	9	10	11	12	13	14	15	16	17	18	19	20	21	22	23	24	25	26	27	28	29	30	31	32	33	34
Ground	A	H	A	H	A	H	A	H	A	H	A	A	H	A	H	A	H	H	A	H	A	H	A	H	A	H	A	H	H	A	H	A	H	A
Result	L	D	L	L	L	L	D	L	D	W	D	D	L	D	L	D	D	D	L	L	L	W	L	D	L	W	D	W	W	D	D	D	W	W
Position	16	13	17	18	18	18	17	18	18	17	16	16	17	17	17	16	16	16	17	17	17	17	17	17	17	16	16	16	16	15	16	16	15	13

Source: DFB
A = Away; H = Home; W = Win; D = Draw; L = Loss

==== Matches ====
The league fixtures were unveiled on 30 June 2023.

20 August 2023 1	Union Berlin	4–1	Mainz 05	Berlin
15:30 CEST (UTC+2)	Behrens 1', 9', 70', (yellow card) 11'; Pantović 90+6'	Report	Lee Jae-sung (yellow card) 31'; Kohr (yellow card) 51'; Da Costa (yellow card) 59'; Ajorque (penalty missed) 62', 88'; Caci 64'; Barreiro (yellow card) 80'; Van den Berg (yellow card) 90+2'	Stadium: Stadion An der Alten Försterei; Attendance: 22,012; Referee: Tobias Stieler

27 August 2023 2	Mainz 05	1–1	Eintracht Frankfurt	Mainz
15:30 CEST (UTC+2)	Lee Jae-sung 25'; Fernandes (yellow card) 55'; Kohr (yellow card) 75'; Van den Berg (yellow card) 86'	Report	Koch (yellow card) 32'; Knauff (yellow card) 49' (yellow-red card) 61'; Marmoush 90+1', (yellow card) 90+2'	Stadium: Mewa Arena; Attendance: 33,305; Referee: Bastian Dankert

2 September 2023 3	Werder Bremen	4–0	Mainz 05	Bremen
15:30 CEST (UTC+2)	Ducksch 3' (pen.); Stage (yellow card) 10', (goal) 53'; Stark (yellow card) 45+3'; Friedl (yellow card) 55'; Bittencourt 82'; Njinmah 83'	Report	Hanche-Olsen (yellow card) 2'; Van den Berg (yellow card) 65'	Stadium: Weserstadion; Attendance: 41,000; Referee: Robert Schröder

16 September 2023 4	Mainz 05	1–3	VfB Stuttgart	Mainz
15:30 CEST (UTC+2)	Caci (yellow card) 11'; Barreiro 70'	Report	Guirassy 56', 84', 90+7'; Stiller (yellow card) 60'; Anton (yellow card) 67'	Stadium: Mewa Arena; Attendance: 30,500; Referee: Harm Osmers

23 September 2023 5	FC Augsburg	2–1	Mainz 05	Augsburg
15:30 CEST (UTC+2)	Demirović 15', 45'; Engels (yellow card) 60' (yellow-red card) 62'; Dorsch (yellow card) 90+1'; Beljo (yellow card) 90+5'	Report	Ajorque 6'; Gruda (yellow card) 74'; Zentner (yellow card) 77'; Lee Jae-Sung (yellow card) 90+7'	Stadium: Augsburg Arena; Attendance: 27,310; Referee: Marco Fritz

30 September 2023 6	Mainz 05	0–3	Bayer Leverkusen	Mainz
20:30 CEST (UTC+2)	Fernandes (yellow card) 58'; Gruda (yellow card) 75'; Richter (yellow card) 90+2'; Barreiro (yellow card) 90+4'	Report	Xhaka (yellow card) 4'; Van den Berg 18' (o.g.); Grimaldo 59'; Hofmann 65'	Stadium: Mewa Arena; Attendance: 33,305; Referee: Benjamin Brand

6 October 2023 7	Borussia Mönchengladbach	2–2	Mainz 05	Mönchengladbach
20:30 CEST (UTC+2)	Neuhaus 22'; Itakura (yellow card) 56'; Koné (yellow card) 81'; Hack (yellow card) 82'; Scally 88'	Report	Gruda 24'; Bell (yellow card) 66'; Barkok 75'	Stadium: Borussia-Park; Attendance: 51,529; Referee: Sven Jablonski

21 October 2023 8	Mainz 05	1–3	Bayern Munich	Mainz
18:30 CEST (UTC+2)	Caci 43'; Ajorque (yellow card) 45+2'; Kohr (yellow card) 49'; Bell (yellow card) 65'	Report	Coman 11'; Kane 16'; De Ligt (yellow card) 27'; Goretzka 59'; Laimer (yellow card) 90+1'	Stadium: Mewa Arena; Attendance: 33,305; Referee: Sascha Stegemann

27 October 2023 9	VfL Bochum	2–2	Mainz 05	Bochum
20:30 CEST (UTC+2)	Stöger 21' (pen.); Bernardo (yellow card) 51'; Schlotterbeck 82'; Paciência (yellow card) 88'; Losilla (yellow card) 90+5'	Report	Barreiro (yellow card) 15'; Kohr (yellow card) 20'; Schlotterbeck 59' (o.g.); Lee Jae-sung (yellow card) 71'; Krauß 90+6'	Stadium: Ruhrstadion; Attendance: 26,000; Referee: Patrick Ittrich

4 November 2023 10	Mainz 05	2–0	RB Leipzig	Mainz
15:30 CET (UTC+1)	Caci (yellow card) 39'; Lee Jae-sung 76'; Barreiro 80'; Barkok (yellow card) 88'; Van den Berg (yellow card) 90'	Report	Klostermann (yellow card) 51'	Stadium: Mewa Arena; Attendance: 30,100; Referee: Bastian Dankert

11 November 2023 11	Darmstadt 98	0–0	Mainz 05	Darmstadt
15:30 CET (UTC+1)	Klarer (yellow card) 69'; Hornby (yellow card) 73'; Franjić (yellow card) 90+1'	Report	Van den Berg (yellow card) 35'; Zentner (yellow card) 57'; Kohr (yellow card) 59'	Stadium: Merck-Stadion am Böllenfalltor; Attendance: 17,810; Referee: Daniel Siebert

26 November 2023 12	1899 Hoffenheim	1–1	Mainz 05	Sinsheim
17:30 CET (UTC+1)	Kramarić (yellow card) 25'; Brooks (yellow card) 30'; Kabak (yellow card) 32'; Prömel (yellow card) 44'; Skov 48'	Report	Fernandes (yellow card) 25'; Caci (yellow card) 29'; Richter 39', (yellow card) 68'; Barkok (penalty missed) 68'; Mwene (yellow card) 90+1'	Stadium: Rhein-Neckar-Arena; Attendance: 22,000; Referee: Deniz Aytekin

3 December 2023 13	Mainz 05	0–1	SC Freiburg	Mainz
15:30 CET (UTC+1)	Barreiro (yellow card) 29'	Report	Gregoritsch 70'; Sallai (yellow card) 87'	Stadium: Mewa Arena; Attendance: 30,300; Referee: Tobias Stieler

10 December 2023 14	1. FC Köln	0–0	Mainz 05	Cologne
17:30 CET (UTC+1)	Martel (yellow card) 50'; Uth (yellow card) 85'	Report	Krauß (yellow card) 58'; Kohr (yellow card) 83'; Papela (yellow card) 84'; Widmer (yellow card) 87'	Stadium: RheinEnergieStadion; Attendance: 50,000; Referee: Frank Willenborg

16 December 2023 15	Mainz 05	0–1	1. FC Heidenheim	Mainz
15:30 CET (UTC+1)	Krauß (yellow card) 38'; Ajorque (yellow card) 44'; Gruda (yellow card) 90+3'	Report	Pieringer 12'; Gimber (yellow card) 30'; Busch (yellow card) 34'; Beste (yellow card) 57'	Stadium: Mewa Arena; Attendance: 27,200; Referee: Bastian Dankert

19 December 2023 16	Borussia Dortmund	1–1	Mainz 05	Dortmund
20:30 CET (UTC+1)	Brandt 29'	Report	Bell (yellow card) 39'; Van den Berg 43'; Burkardt (yellow card) 85'; Krauß (yellow card) 90'; Barkok (yellow card) 90+2'	Stadium: Signal Iduna Park; Attendance: 80,350; Referee: Marco Fritz

13 January 2024 17	Mainz 05	1–1	VfL Wolfsburg	Mainz
15:30 CET (UTC+1)	Widmer (yellow card) 3', (goal) 61'; Van den Berg (yellow card) 46'; Fernandes (yellow card) 57'	Report	Černý 12'; Vranckx (yellow card) 16'; Jenz (yellow card) 27'; Casteels (yellow card) 54'; Svanberg (yellow card) 79'	Stadium: Mewa Arena; Attendance: 24,000; Referee: Patrick Ittrich

26 January 2024 19	Eintracht Frankfurt	1–0	Mainz 05	Frankfurt
20:30 CET (UTC+1)	Pacho (yellow card) 24'; Nkounkou (yellow card) 34'; Götze 73'	Report	Widmer (yellow card) 40'	Stadium: Deutsche Bank Park; Attendance: 58,000; Referee: Felix Zwayer

3 February 2024 20	Mainz 05	0–1	Werder Bremen	Mainz
15:30 CET (UTC+1)	Krauß (yellow card) 67'; Amiri (yellow card) 80'; Richter (yellow card) 87'; Caci (yellow card) 88'	Report	Ducksch 2'; Stark (yellow card) 35'; Friedl (yellow card) 45+1'; Bittencourt (yellow card) 88'	Stadium: Mewa Arena; Attendance: 31,800; Referee: Benjamin Brand

7 February 2024 18	Mainz 05	1–1	Union Berlin	Mainz
18:30 CET (UTC+1)	Ajorque (yellow card) 15'; Burkardt 45+8'; Kohr (yellow card) 89'	Report	Gosens 45+13'; Vogt (yellow card) 53'; Leite (yellow card) 79'; Haberer (yellow card) 84'; Doekhi (yellow card) 89'	Stadium: Mewa Arena; Attendance: 26,200; Referee: Martin Petersen
Note: The match was originally scheduled for 19 January 2024, but was postponed due to icing in the stands.

11 February 2024 21	VfB Stuttgart	3–1	Mainz 05	Stuttgart
15:30 CET (UTC+1)	Mittelstadt 45+2'; Leweling 45+5'; Undav 73'; Karazor (yellow card) 82'	Report	Ajorque 76'; Guilavogui (yellow card) 84'	Stadium: MHPArena; Attendance: 52,500; Referee: Deniz Aytekin

17 February 2024 22	Mainz 05	1–0	FC Augsburg	Mainz
15:30 CET (UTC+1)	Lee Jae-sung (yellow card) 35'; Van den Berg 44', (yellow card) 90+14'; Amiri (penalty missed) 45+6'; Kohr (yellow card) 90+7'	Report	Dahmen (yellow card) 45+5'; Gouweleeuw (yellow card) 90+7'; Valentin (red card) 90+14'	Stadium: Mewa Arena; Attendance: 24,800; Referee: Tobias Reichel

23 February 2024 23	Bayer Leverkusen	2–1	Mainz 05	Leverkusen
20:30 CET (UTC+1)	Xhaka 3'; Frimpong (yellow card) 45+1'; Tah (yellow card) 49'; Andrich 68'; Wirtz (yellow card) 74'	Report	Kohr 7', (yellow card) 52'; Onisiwo (yellow card) 42'; Zentner (yellow card) 54'; Caci (yellow card) 66'; Ngankam (red card) 80'; Mwene (yellow card) 85'	Stadium: BayArena; Attendance: 30,210; Referee: Timo Gerach

2 March 2024 24	Mainz 05	1–1	Borussia Mönchengladbach	Mainz
15:30 CET (UTC+1)	Burkardt 12'; Barreiro (yellow card) 50'; Kohr (yellow card) 58' (yellow-red card) 84'; Mwene (yellow card) 81'; Amiri (yellow card) 90+3'	Report	Ngoumou (yellow card) 43', (goal) 55'	Stadium: Mewa Arena; Attendance: 33,305; Referee: Robert Schröder

9 March 2024 25	Bayern Munich	8–1	Mainz 05	Munich
15:30 CET (UTC+1)	Laimer (yellow card) 5'; Kane 13', 45+7', 70'; Goretzka 20', 90+2'; Müller 47'; Musiala 61'; Gnabry 66'	Report	Amiri 31'; Widmer (yellow card) 84'	Stadium: Allianz Arena; Attendance: 75,000; Referee: Patrick Ittrich

16 March 2024 26	Mainz 05	2–0	VfL Bochum	Mainz
15:30 CET (UTC+1)	Kohr (yellow card) 1'; Ajorque (yellow card) 8'; Burkardt 45+3' (pen.), 71'; Van den Berg (yellow card) 84'; Amiri (yellow card) 88'	Report	Bernardo (yellow card) 33'; Osterhage (yellow card) 47'; Schlotterbeck (yellow card) 87'	Stadium: Mewa Arena; Attendance: 33,000; Referee: Matthias Jöllenbeck

30 March 2024 27	RB Leipzig	0–0	Mainz 05	Leipzig
15:30 CET (UTC+1)	Lukeba (yellow card) 67'; Simons (yellow card) 86'	Report	Caci (yellow card) 20'; Mwene (yellow card) 27'; Amiri (yellow card) 34'; Barreiro (yellow card) 70'; Hanche-Olsen (yellow card) 79'	Stadium: Red Bull Arena; Attendance: 44,813; Referee: Frank Willenborg

6 April 2024 28	Mainz 05	4–0	Darmstadt 98	Mainz
15:30 CEST (UTC+2)	Hanche-Olsen 33'; Kohr (yellow card) 51'; Gruda 60', (yellow card) 75'; Lee Jae-sung 80', 84'	Report	Lieberknecht (yellow card) 35'; Skarke (yellow card) 51'; Brunst-Zöllner (yellow card) 56'	Stadium: Mewa Arena; Attendance: 33,000; Referee: Daniel Schlager

13 April 2024 29	Mainz 05	4–1	1899 Hoffenheim	Mainz
15:30 CEST (UTC+2)	Burkardt 47'; Mwene 51'; Gruda 63'; Onisiwo 88'	Report	Kadeřábek 19'; Prömel (yellow card) 39'; Kabak (yellow card) 83'	Stadium: Mewa Arena; Attendance: 31,000; Referee: Felix Zwayer

21 April 2024 30	SC Freiburg	1–1	Mainz 05	Freiburg
19:30 CEST (UTC+2)	Gregoritsch 6'; Kübler (yellow card) 31'; Höfler (yellow card) 42'; Höler (yellow card) 70'	Report	Lee Jae-sung (yellow card) 35'; Burkardt 40'; Krauß (yellow card) 62'; Caci (yellow card) 71'; Van den Berg (yellow card) 85'	Stadium: Europa-Park Stadion; Attendance: 34,300; Referee: Marco Fritz

28 April 2024 31	Mainz 05	1–1	1. FC Köln	Mainz
17:30 CEST (UTC+2)	Caci (yellow card) 28'; Barreiro 29'; Hanche-Olsen (yellow card) 70'; Amiri (yellow card) 83'; Gruda (yellow card) 87'; Mwene (red card) 90+9'	Report	Alidou (yellow card) 28'; Waldschmidt (penalty missed) 48'; Chabot (yellow card) 66'; Uth (yellow card) 66'; Schmitz (yellow card) 76'; Kainz 90+5' (pen.)	Stadium: Mewa Arena; Attendance: 33,305; Referee: Benjamin Brand

5 May 2024 32	1. FC Heidenheim	1–1	Mainz 05	Heidenheim
19:30 CEST (UTC+2)	Gimber (yellow card) 35'; Kleindienst 65', (yellow card) 77'	Report	Barreiro (yellow card) 27'; Burkardt 37', (yellow card) 69'; Kohr (yellow card) 84'	Stadium: Voith-Arena; Attendance: 15,000; Referee: Sven Jablonski

11 May 2024 33	Mainz 05	3–0	Borussia Dortmund	Mainz
18:30 CEST (UTC+2)	Barreiro 12', (yellow card) 56'; Lee Jae-sung 19', 23'; Hanche-Olsen (yellow card) 45+1'	Report	Reus (yellow card) 41'; Schlotterbeck (yellow card) 80'	Stadium: Mewa Arena; Attendance: 33,305; Referee: Tobias Stieler

18 May 2024 34	VfL Wolfsburg	1–3	Mainz 05	Wolfsburg
15:30 CEST (UTC+2)	Paredes 18'; Wimmer (yellow card) 52'; Majer (yellow card) 71'	Report	Lee Jae-sung (yellow card) 12'; Gruda 24'; Hanche-Olsen (yellow card) 54'; Van den Berg 72'; Burkardt 85'; Kohr (yellow card) 89'	Stadium: Volkswagen Arena; Attendance: 26,627; Referee: Frank Willenborg

=== DFB-Pokal ===
12 August 2023 First round	SV Elversberg	0–1	Mainz 05	Spiesen-Elversberg
18:00 CEST (UTC+2)	Feil (yellow card) 70' (yellow-red card) 83'; Neubauer (yellow card) 80'	Report	Ajorque 73' (pen.); Bell (yellow card) 90+2'; Van den Berg (yellow card) 90+6'	Stadium: Waldstadion an der Kaiserlinde; Attendance: 10,000; Referee: Martin Petersen

1 November 2023 Second round	Hertha BSC	3–0	Mainz 05	Berlin
20:45 CET (UTC+1)	Reese 45+3' (pen.); Tabaković 50' (pen.), 61'; Zeefuik (yellow card) 78'	Report	Ajorque (yellow card) 90+3'	Stadium: Olympiastadion; Attendance: 29,621; Referee: Matthias Jöllenbeck

== Statistics ==
=== Squad appearances and goals ===
As of 17 February 2024

No.	Pos	Nat	Player	Total		Bundesliga		DFB-Pokal	
No.	Pos	Nat	Player	Apps	Goals	Apps	Goals	Apps	Goals
Goalkeepers
1	GK	(Germany) GER	Lasse Rieß	0	0	0	0	0	0
27	GK	(Germany) GER	Robin Zentner	20	0	18	0	2	0
33	GK	(Germany) GER	Daniel Batz	4	0	4	0	0	0
Defenders
2	DF	(Austria) AUT	Phillipp Mwene	13	0	13	0	0	0
3	DF	(Netherlands) NED	Sepp van den Berg	23	2	19+2	2	0+2	0
5	DF	(Germany) GER	Maxim Leitsch	8	0	4+3	0	1	0
16	DF	(Germany) GER	Stefan Bell	11	0	8+2	0	1	0
19	DF	(France) FRA	Anthony Caci	22	2	19+1	2	2	0
21	DF	(Germany) GER	Danny da Costa	17	0	9+6	0	1+1	0
25	DF	(Norway) NOR	Andreas Hanche-Olsen	5	0	3+2	0	0	0
30	DF	(Switzerland) SUI	Silvan Widmer	8	1	7+1	1	0	0
Midfielders
7	MF	(South Korea) KOR	Lee Jae-sung	20	2	14+4	2	2	0
8	MF	(Luxembourg) LUX	Leandro Barreiro	22	2	18+2	2	2	0
14	MF	(Germany) GER	Tom Krauß	22	1	12+8	1	1+1	0
18	MF	(Germany) GER	Nadiem Amiri	4	0	4	0	0	0
20	MF	(Switzerland) SUI	Edimilson Fernandes	16	0	12+2	0	2	0
23	MF	(France) FRA	Josuha Guilavogui	5	0	2+2	0	1	0
24	MF	(Germany) GER	Merveille Papela	12	0	3+8	0	0+1	0
31	MF	(Germany) GER	Dominik Kohr	23	0	17+4	0	1+1	0
41	MF	(Albania) ALB	Eniss Shabani	0	0	0	0	0	0
45	MF	(Germany) GER	David Mamutovic	2	0	0+2	0	0	0
Forwards
9	FW	(Austria) AUT	Karim Onisiwo	19	0	14+3	0	2	0
10	FW	(Germany) GER	Marco Richter	17	1	7+9	1	0+1	0
11	FW	(Germany) GER	Jessic Ngankam	4	0	2+2	0	0	0
17	FW	(France) FRA	Ludovic Ajorque	20	3	12+6	2	1+1	1
29	FW	(Germany) GER	Jonathan Burkardt	10	1	7+3	1	0	0
43	FW	(Germany) GER	Brajan Gruda	19	1	10+8	1	1	0
44	FW	(Germany) GER	Nelson Weiper	4	0	1+2	0	0+1	0
48	FW	(Germany) GER	Marcus Müller	1	0	0+1	0	0	0
Players who made an appearance this season but left the club
4	MF	(Morocco) MAR	Aymen Barkok	14	1	1+12	1	1	0
6	MF	(Germany) GER	Anton Stach	3	0	2	0	1	0

=== Goalscorers ===
As of 2 March 2024

Rank	Pos	No.	Nat	Name	Bundesliga	DFB-Pokal	Total
1	FW	17	(France)	Ludovic Ajorque	2	1	3
2	MF	7	(South Korea)	Lee Jae-sung	2	0	2
2	MF	8	(Luxembourg)	Leandro Barreiro	2	0	2
2	DF	19	(France)	Anthony Caci	2	0	2
2	DF	3	(Netherlands)	Sepp van den Berg	2	0	2
2	FW	29	(Germany)	Jonathan Burkardt	2	0	2
7	MF	14	(Germany)	Tom Krauß	1	0	1
7	MF	4	(Morocco)	Aymen Barkok	1	0	1
7	FW	43	(Germany)	Brajan Gruda	1	0	1
7	FW	10	(Germany)	Marco Richter	1	0	1
7	DF	30	(Switzerland)	Silvan Widmer	1	0	1
7	MF	31	(Germany)	Dominik Kohr	1	0	1
Own goals					1	0	1
Totals					19	1	20
