= 2019–20 1. FSV Mainz 05 season =

1. FSV Mainz 05
2019–20 season
- Chairman: Stefan Hofmann
- Head coach: Sandro Schwarz (until 10 November); Achim Beierlorzer (from 18 November)
- Stadium: Opel Arena
- Bundesliga: 13th
- DFB-Pokal: First round
- Top goalscorer: League: Robin Quaison (12); All: Robin Quaison (12)
Home colours	Away colours	Third colours

The 2019–20 season was 1. FSV Mainz 05's 121st season in existence and the club's 39th consecutive season in the top flight of German football. In addition to the domestic league, 1. FSV Mainz 05 participated in this season's edition of the DFB-Pokal. The season covered a period from 1 July 2019 to 30 June 2020.

== Players ==
=== Current squad ===
As of 7 February 2020

Note: Flags indicate national team as defined under FIFA eligibility rules; some limited exceptions apply. Players may hold more than one non-FIFA nationality.

No.	Pos.	Nation	Player
1	GK	GER	Florian Müller
2	DF	FRA	Ronaël Pierre-Gabriel
3	DF	ESP	Aarón Martín
4	DF	NED	Jerry St. Juste
5	MF	NED	Jean-Paul Boëtius
6	MF	GER	Danny Latza (captain)
7	FW	SWE	Robin Quaison
8	MF	GER	Levin Öztunalı
9	FW	FRA	Jean-Philippe Mateta
11	FW	KOR	Ji Dong-won
13	DF	NED	Jeffrey Bruma (on loan from VfL Wolfsburg)
14	MF	CMR	Pierre Kunde
15	MF	GER	Niklas Tauer
16	DF	GER	Stefan Bell
17	DF	GER	Jonathan Meier
18	DF	GER	Daniel Brosinski (vice-captain)
19	DF	FRA	Moussa Niakhaté

No.	Pos.	Nation	Player
20	MF	SUI	Edimilson Fernandes
21	FW	AUT	Karim Onisiwo
22	FW	NGR	Taiwo Awoniyi (on loan from Liverpool)
23	DF	AUT	Phillipp Mwene
24	MF	GER	Merveille Papela
27	GK	GER	Robin Zentner
28	FW	HUN	Ádám Szalai
29	FW	GER	Jonathan Burkardt
30	FW	GER	Cyrill Akono
33	GK	ISR	Omer Hanin
34	MF	GER	Bote Baku
35	MF	LUX	Leandro Barreiro
37	GK	GER	Finn Dahmen
38	MF	GER	Erkan Eyibil
42	DF	GER	Alexander Hack

=== Out on loan ===
Note: Flags indicate national team as defined under FIFA eligibility rules; some limited exceptions apply. Players may hold more than one non-FIFA nationality.

No.	Pos.	Nation	Player
—	FW	GER	Gerrit Holtmann (at SC Paderborn until 30 June 2020)
—	FW	GHA	Abass Issah (at FC Utrecht until 30 June 2020)
—	DF	GER	Ahmet Gürleyen (at FC Liefering until 30 June 2020)

No.	Pos.	Nation	Player
—	FW	GER	Aaron Seydel (at SSV Jahn Regensburg until 30 June 2020)
—	MF	ROU	Alexandru Maxim (at Gaziantep until 30 June 2020)

== Pre-season and friendlies ==
Win Draw Loss

10 July 2019 Friendly	Mainz 05	9–0	Sportfreunde Eisbachtal	Mainz, Germany
15:00 CEST (UTC+2)		Report		Stadium: Bruchwegstadion; Attendance: 1,000; Referee: Luca Schlosser

13 July 2019 Friendly	Gonsenheim	0–8	Mainz 05	Mainz, Germany
17:00 CEST (UTC+2)		Report		Stadium: Bretzenheim BSA Rasenplatz

17 July 2019 Friendly	Mainz 05	2–0	Rayo Vallecano	Schwaz, Austria
16:00 CEST (UTC+2)		Report		Stadium: Silberstadt Arena Schwaz

21 July 2019 Friendly	Mainz 05	1–2	Jahn Regensburg	Kirchheim, Germany
18:00 CEST (UTC+2)		Report		Stadium: Sportpark Heimstetten

3 August 2019 Friendly	Metz	0–1	Mainz 05	Molsheim, France
11:00 CEST (UTC+2)		Report	Onisiwo 36'	Stadium: Parc des Sports de Molsheim

3 August 2019 Friendly	Metz	0–1	Mainz 05	Molsheim, France
13:30 CEST (UTC+2)		Report	Öztunalı 85'	Stadium: Parc des Sports de Molsheim

15 November 2019 Friendly	Mainz 05	2–1	Darmstadt 98	Mainz, Germany
16:00 CET (UTC+1)	Öztunalı 63'; Martín 71'	Report	Ožegović 42' (pen.)	Stadium: Bruchwegstadion; Attendance: 536; Referee: Timo Gerach

7 January 2020 Friendly	Mainz 05	2–3	FC Emmen	Estepona, Spain
16:00 CET (UTC+1)	Szalai 35'; Boëtius 67'	Report	Kolar 19'; Bijl 65'; Slagveer 68'	Stadium: Complejo Deportivo Arroyo Enmedio

11 January 2020 Friendly	Borussia Dortmund	0–2	Mainz 05	Marbella, Spain
17:00 CET (UTC+1)		Report	Onisiwo 45+1'; Niakhaté 54', (yellow card) 88'; Szalai (yellow card) 86'	Stadium: Estadio Municipal de Marbella

== Competitions ==
Win Draw Loss

=== Overview ===
Competition	First match	Last match	Starting round	Final position	Record							
Competition	First match	Last match	Starting round	Final position	Pld	W	D	L	GF	GA	GD	Win %
Bundesliga	17 August 2019	27 June 2020	Matchday 1	13th	34	11	4	19	44	65	−21	32.35
DFB-Pokal	10 August 2019		First round	First round	1	0	0	1	0	2	−2	0.00
Total					35	11	4	20	44	67	−23	31.43

Last updated: 27 June 2020
Source: Soccerway

=== Bundesliga ===
==== League table ====
Pos	Team	Pld	W	D	L	GF	GA	GD	Pts
11	Union Berlin	34	12	5	17	41	58	−17	41
12	Schalke 04	34	9	12	13	38	58	−20	39
13	Mainz 05	34	11	4	19	44	65	−21	37
14	1. FC Köln	34	10	6	18	51	69	−18	36
15	FC Augsburg	34	9	9	16	45	63	−18	36

Source: DFB
Rules for classification: 1) Points; 2) Goal difference; 3) Goals scored; 4) Head-to-head results; 5) Head-to-head away goals scored; 6) Away goals scored; 7) Play-off.

==== Results summary ====
Overall								Home						Away					
Pld	W	D	L	GF	GA	GD	Pts	W	D	L	GF	GA	GD	W	D	L	GF	GA	GD
34	11	4	19	44	65	−21	37	5	2	10	18	29	−11	6	2	9	26	36	−10

Last updated: 27 June 2020.
Source: Bundesliga

==== Results by round ====
Round	1	2	3	4	5	6	7	8	9	10	11	12	13	14	15	16	17	18	19	20	21	22	23	24	25	26	27	28	29	30	31	32	33	34
Ground	A	H	A	H	A	H	A	A	H	A	H	A	H	A	H	A	H	H	A	H	A	H	A	H	H	A	H	A	H	H	A	H	H	A
Result	L	L	L	W	L	L	W	L	W	L	L	W	W	L	L	W	L	L	L	L	W	D	L	W	D	D	L	D	L	W	L	W	W	L
Position	16	18	18	16	17	17	16	17	13	16	16	13	12	13	14	14	14	15	15	15	15	15	15	15	15	15	15	15	15	15	15	15	13	13

Updated to match(es) played on 27 June 2020. Source: Bundesliga
A = Away; H = Home; W = Win; D = Draw; L = Loss

==== Matches ====
The Bundesliga schedule was announced on 28 June 2019.

17 August 2019 1	SC Freiburg	3–0	Mainz 05	Freiburg
15:30 CEST (UTC+2)	Lienhart (yellow card) 62'; Höler 81'; Schmid 83'; Waldschmidt 87' (pen.)	Report	St. Juste (yellow card) 11'; Latza (yellow card) 29'; Fernandes (yellow card) 34'	Stadium: Schwarzwald-Stadion; Attendance: 24,000; Referee: Robert Hartmann

24 August 2019 2	Mainz 05	1–3	Borussia Mönchengladbach	Mainz
15:30 CEST (UTC+2)	Quaison 18'; Onisiwo (yellow card) 45'; Niakhaté (yellow card) 45+5'	Report	Lainer 31'; Pléa 77'; Embolo 79'; Zakaria (yellow card) 86'; Kramer (yellow card) 89'	Stadium: Opel Arena; Attendance: 28,005; Referee: Martin Petersen

31 August 2019 3	Bayern Munich	6–1	Mainz 05	Munich
15:30 CEST (UTC+2)	Kimmich (yellow card) 20'; Pavard 36'; Alaba 45'; Perišić 54'; Coman 64'; Hernandez (yellow card) 73'; Thiago (yellow card) 75'; Lewandowski 78'; Davies 80'	Report	Boëtius 6'; Niakhaté (yellow card) 33'; Hack (yellow card) 45'; Kunde (yellow card) 77'	Stadium: Allianz Arena; Attendance: 75,000; Referee: Markus Schmidt

14 September 2019 4	Mainz 05	2–1	Hertha BSC	Mainz
15:30 CEST (UTC+2)	St. Juste (yellow card) 33', (goal) 88'; Quaison 40'; Kunde (yellow card) 89'	Report	Skjelbred (yellow card) 37'; Stark (yellow card) 75'; Grujić 83'	Stadium: Opel Arena; Attendance: 22,798; Referee: Marco Fritz

20 September 2019 5	Schalke 04	2–1	Mainz 05	Gelsenkirchen
20:30 CEST (UTC+2)	Serdar 36'; McKennie (yellow card) 47'; Harit 89'	Report	Brosinski (yellow card) 65'; Onisiwo 75'	Stadium: Veltins-Arena; Attendance: 58,687; Referee: Daniel Schlager

28 September 2019 6	Mainz 05	0–1	VfL Wolfsburg	Mainz
15:30 CEST (UTC+2)	Niakhaté (yellow card) 39'; Maxim (yellow card) 86'	Report	Tisserand 9', (yellow card) 37'; Knoche (yellow card) 61'; Weghorst (yellow card) 65'	Stadium: Opel Arena; Attendance: 24,303; Referee: Felix Brych

5 October 2019 7	SC Paderborn	1–2	Mainz 05	Paderborn
15:30 CEST (UTC+2)	Zolinski 14'; Ritter (yellow card) 67'	Report	Quaison 8'; Niakhaté (yellow card) 25'; Brosinski 32' (pen.); Baku (yellow card) 35'; Öztunalı (yellow card) 70'; Fernandes (yellow card) 83'	Stadium: Benteler-Arena; Attendance: 14,217; Referee: Patrick Ittrich

19 October 2019 8	Fortuna Düsseldorf	1–0	Mainz 05	Düsseldorf
15:30 CEST (UTC+2)	Ayhan (yellow card) 60'; Tekpetey (yellow card) 66'; Hennings 82'	Report	Fernandes (yellow card) 31' (yellow-red card) 45+1'; Zentner (yellow card) 82'; Boëtius (yellow card) 87'	Stadium: Merkur Spiel-Arena; Attendance: 40,660; Referee: Felix Zwayer

25 October 2019 9	Mainz 05	3–1	1. FC Köln	Mainz
20:30 CEST (UTC+2)	Boëtius 21'; Kunde (yellow card) 48'; Quaison 57'; Niakhaté (yellow card) 60'; Öztunalı 82'	Report	Terodde 14'; Bornauw (yellow card) 41'; Hector (yellow card) 80'	Stadium: Opel Arena; Attendance: 31,999; Referee: Frank Willenborg

2 November 2019 10	RB Leipzig	8–0	Mainz 05	Leipzig
15:30 CET (UTC+1)	Sabitzer 5'; Werner 30', 48', 87'; Nkunku 35'; Halstenberg 39'; Poulsen 44'; Mukiele 50'	Report	Pierre-Gabriel (yellow card) 84'	Stadium: Red Bull Arena; Attendance: 38,517; Referee: Guido Winkmann

9 November 2019 11	Mainz 05	2–3	1. FC Union Berlin	Mainz
15:30 CET (UTC+1)	St. Juste (yellow card) 42'; Onisiwo 81'; Brosinski 90+4'	Report	Andrich (yellow card) 4'; Brosinski 30' (o.g.); Andersson 45+3', 51'; Parensen (yellow card) 49'; Polter (yellow card) 69'; Friedrich (yellow card) 72'	Stadium: Opel Arena; Attendance: 24,349; Referee: Harm Osmers

24 November 2019 12	1899 Hoffenheim	1–5	Mainz 05	Sinsheim
18:00 CET (UTC+1)	Akpoguma (yellow card) 28'; Kramarić 83'	Report	Onisiwo (yellow card) 10'; Öztunalı 33'; Baku (red card) 45+2'; Kadeřábek 52' (o.g.); Kunde 62', 90+3', (yellow card) 71'; St. Juste (yellow card) 81'; Boëtius 90'	Stadium: PreZero Arena; Attendance: 23,129; Referee: Bastian Dankert

2 December 2019 13	Mainz 05	2–1	Eintracht Frankfurt	Mainz
20:30 CET (UTC+1)	Onisiwo 50'; Latza (yellow card) 55'; Szalai 69'	Report	Hinteregger (yellow card) 14', (goal) 34'; Kohr (red card) 44'; Torró (yellow card) 89'	Stadium: Opel Arena; Attendance: 33,184; Referee: Manuel Gräfe

7 December 2019 14	FC Augsburg	2–1	Mainz 05	Augsburg
15:30 CET (UTC+1)	Vargas (yellow card) 28'; Richter 41'; Niederlechner 65' (pen.); Jedvaj (yellow card) 88'	Report	Öztunalı 15'; Fernandes (yellow card) 44'; Quaison (yellow card) 59'	Stadium: WWK Arena; Attendance: 26,950; Referee: Markus Schmidt

14 December 2019 15	Mainz 05	0–4	Borussia Dortmund	Mainz
15:30 CET (UTC+1)	St. Juste (yellow card) 23'	Report	Reus 32'; Sancho 66'; Hazard 69'; Schulz 84'	Stadium: Opel Arena; Attendance: 33,305; Referee: Benjamin Cortus

17 December 2019 16	Werder Bremen	0–5	Mainz 05	Bremen
18:30 CET (UTC+1)	Eggestein (yellow card) 77'; Bittencourt (yellow card) 79'	Report	Quaison 10', 19', 38'; Pavlenka 15' (o.g.); Fernandes (yellow card) 18'; Baku (yellow card) 79'; Mateta 81'	Stadium: Weser-Stadion; Attendance: 37,720; Referee: Frank Willenborg

21 December 2019 17	Mainz 05	0–1	Bayer Leverkusen	Mainz
15:30 CET (UTC+1)		Report	Wendell (yellow card) 58' (yellow-red card) 71'; Alario 90+3'	Stadium: Opel Arena; Attendance: 24,345; Referee: Patrick Ittrich

18 January 2020 18	Mainz 05	1–2	SC Freiburg	Mainz
15:30 CET (UTC+1)	Baku (yellow card) 26'; Hack (yellow card) 40'; Kunde (yellow card) 51'; Niakhaté (yellow card) 82'; Mateta 82'	Report	Kwon 28'; Haberer (yellow card) 37'; Petersen 41'; Abrashi (yellow card) 82'	Stadium: Opel Arena; Attendance: 23,138; Referee: Sven Jablonski

25 January 2020 19	Borussia Mönchengladbach	3–1	Mainz 05	Mönchengladbach
15:30 CET (UTC+1)	Pléa 24', 76'; Embolo (yellow card) 85'; Neuhaus 88'	Report	Pierre-Gabriel (yellow card) 10'; Quaison 11'; Brosinski (yellow card) 81'; Baku (yellow card) 86'	Stadium: Borussia-Park; Attendance: 49,175; Referee: Felix Zwayer

1 February 2020 20	Mainz 05	1–3	Bayern Munich	Mainz
15:30 CET (UTC+1)	St. Juste 45', (yellow card) 57'; Boëtius (yellow card) 87'; Latza (yellow card) 88'	Report	Lewandowski 8'; Müller 14'; Thiago 26'; Goretzka (yellow card) 65'	Stadium: Opel Arena; Attendance: 33,305; Referee: Bastian Dankert

8 February 2020 21	Hertha BSC	1–3	Mainz 05	Berlin
15:30 CET (UTC+1)	Ascacíbar (yellow card) 36'; Wolf (yellow card) 70' (yellow-red card) 89'; Boyata 84', (yellow card) 90+2'	Report	Quaison 17', 82', 90+4' (pen.); Latza (yellow card) 69'	Stadium: Olympiastadion; Attendance: 35,049; Referee: Martin Petersen

16 February 2020 22	Mainz 05	0–0	Schalke 04	Mainz
18:00 CET (UTC+1)	Bruma (yellow card) 33'; Brosinski (yellow card) 53'	Report	Todibo (yellow card) 58'; Kutucu (yellow card) 86'	Stadium: Opel Arena; Attendance: 27,482; Referee: Guido Winkmann

23 February 2020 23	VfL Wolfsburg	4–0	Mainz 05	Wolfsburg
18:00 CET (UTC+1)	Brekalo 21'; Steffen 45', 68'; Gerhardt 49'	Report	Barreiro (yellow card) 31'; Pierre-Gabriel (yellow card) 65'	Stadium: Volkswagen Arena; Attendance: 21,058; Referee: Benjamin Cortus

29 February 2020 24	Mainz 05	2–0	SC Paderborn	Mainz
15:30 CET (UTC+1)	Quaison 29'; Onisiwo (yellow card) 31', (goal) 37'	Report	Gjasula (yellow card) 41'; Vasiliadis (yellow card) 57'; Michel (yellow card) 90+2'	Stadium: Opel Arena; Attendance: 24,231; Referee: Harm Osmers

8 March 2020 25	Mainz 05	1–1	Fortuna Düsseldorf	Mainz
18:00 CET (UTC+1)	Mateta (yellow card) 41' (yellow-red card) 77'; Öztunalı 62'; Mwene (yellow card) 66'	Report	Stöger (yellow card) 38'; Karaman 85'	Stadium: Opel Arena; Attendance: 21,409; Referee: Harm Osmers

17 May 2020 26	1. FC Köln	2–2	Mainz 05	Cologne
15:30 CEST (UTC+2)	Uth 6' (pen.); Hector (yellow card) 19'; Kainz (yellow card) 19', (goal) 53'; Rexhbecaj (yellow card) 87'; Skhiri (yellow card) 90'	Report	Ji Dong-won (yellow card) 37'; Awoniyi 61'; Kunde 72'; Martín (yellow card) 90+3'	Stadium: RheinEnergieStadion; Attendance: 0 Referee: Guido Winkmann
Note: The match was postponed on 13 March due to the pandemic of COVID-19 in Germany, and rescheduled to 17 May.

24 May 2020 27	Mainz 05	0–5	RB Leipzig	Mainz
15:30 CEST (UTC+2)	Kunde (yellow card) 20'; Bruma (yellow card) 31'; St. Juste (yellow card) 79'	Report	Werner 11', 48', 75', (yellow card) 35'; Sabitzer (yellow card) 13', (goal) 36'; Upamecano (yellow card) 17'; Poulsen 23'	Stadium: Opel Arena; Attendance: 0 Referee: Markus Schmidt
Note: The match was postponed on 13 March due to the pandemic of COVID-19 in Germany, and rescheduled to 24 May.

27 May 2020 28	Union Berlin	1–1	Mainz 05	Berlin
20:30 CEST (UTC+2)	Andrich (yellow card) 20' (yellow-red card) 42'; Ingvartsen 33'; Schlotterbeck (yellow card) 78'; Friedrich (yellow card) 90+2'	Report	Baku 13'; Boëtius (yellow card) 78'; Latza (yellow card) 89'	Stadium: Stadion An der Alten Försterei; Attendance: 0 Referee: Robert Schröder
Note: The match was postponed on 24 March due to the pandemic of COVID-19 in Germany, and rescheduled to 27 May.

30 May 2020 29	Mainz 05	0–1	1899 Hoffenheim	Mainz
15:30 CEST (UTC+2)	Baku (yellow card) 14'; Bruma (yellow card) 19'; Boëtius (yellow card) 43'; Barreiro (yellow card) 44'	Report	Bogarde (yellow card) 12'; Samassékou (yellow card) 18'; Rudy (yellow card) 31'; Bebou 43'	Stadium: Opel Arena; Attendance: 0 Referee: Sascha Stegemann
Note: The match was postponed on 24 March due to the pandemic of COVID-19 in Germany, and rescheduled to 30 May.

6 June 2020 30	Eintracht Frankfurt	0–2	Mainz 05	Frankfurt
15:30 CEST (UTC+2)	Rode (yellow card) 62'; Chandler (yellow card) 64'; Hinteregger (yellow card) 81'	Report	Latza (yellow card) 41'; Niakhaté 43'; Awoniyi (yellow card) 47'; Barreiro (yellow card) 62'; Kunde 77'	Stadium: Commerzbank-Arena; Attendance: 0 Referee: Felix Brych
Note: The match was postponed on 24 March due to the pandemic of COVID-19 in Germany, and rescheduled to 6 June.

14 June 2020 31	Mainz 05	0–1	FC Augsburg	Mainz
15:30 CEST (UTC+2)	Barreiro (yellow card) 41'; Fernandes (yellow card) 90+3'	Report	Niederlechner 1'; Uduokhai (yellow card) 45'; Gruezo (yellow card) 45+2'; Sarenren Bazee (yellow card) 62'; Framberger (yellow card) 68'	Stadium: Opel Arena; Attendance: 0 Referee: Marco Fritz
Note: The match was postponed on 24 March due to the pandemic of COVID-19 in Germany, and rescheduled to 14 June.

17 June 2020 32	Borussia Dortmund	0–2	Mainz 05	Dortmund
20:30 CEST (UTC+2)	Piszczek (yellow card) 18'; Hummels (yellow card) 37'; Can (yellow card) 54'; Guerreiro (yellow card) 79'; Hakimi (yellow card) 81'; Witsel (yellow card) 90'	Report	Martín (yellow card) 30'; Burkardt 33'; Mateta 49' (pen.); Latza (yellow card) 79'; Szalai (yellow card) 87'	Stadium: Signal Iduna Park; Attendance: 0 Referee: Frank Willenborg
Note: The match was postponed on 24 March due to the pandemic of COVID-19 in Germany, and rescheduled to 17 June.

20 June 2020 33	Mainz 05	3–1	Werder Bremen	Mainz
15:30 CEST (UTC+2)	Quaison 25', (yellow card) 40'; Boëtius 30', (yellow card) 57'; Fernandes 85'	Report	Veljković (yellow card) 22'; Friedl (yellow card) 35'; Osako 58'; Augustinsson (yellow card) 63'	Stadium: Opel Arena; Attendance: 0 Referee: Manuel Gräfe
Note: The match was postponed on 24 March due to the pandemic of COVID-19 in Germany, and rescheduled to 20 June.

27 June 2020 34	Bayer Leverkusen	1–0	Mainz 05	Leverkusen
15:30 CEST (UTC+2)	Volland 2'; Baumgartlinger (yellow card) 90+1'	Report	Niakhaté (yellow card) 68'	Stadium: BayArena; Attendance: 0 Referee: Benjamin Cortus
Note: The match was postponed on 7 May due to the pandemic of COVID-19 in Germany, and rescheduled to 27 June.

=== DFB-Pokal ===
10 August 2019 First round	1. FC Kaiserslautern	2–0	Mainz 05	Kaiserslautern
15:30 CEST (UTC+2)	Hemlein (yellow card) 16'; Matuwila (yellow card) 37'; Starke 63' (pen.); Sickinger (yellow card) 75'; Pick 90', (yellow card) 90'; Grill (yellow card) 90+9'	Report	Onisiwo (yellow card) 25'; Latza (yellow card) 32'; Bell (yellow card) 62'	Stadium: Fritz-Walter-Stadion; Attendance: 41,000; Referee: Felix Zwayer

== Statistics ==
=== Appearances and goals ===
No.	Pos	Nat	Player	Total		Bundesliga		DFB-Pokal	
No.	Pos	Nat	Player	Apps	Goals	Apps	Goals	Apps	Goals
Goalkeepers
1	GK	(Germany) GER	Florian Müller	8	0	6+1	0	1	0
27	GK	(Germany) GER	Robin Zentner	22	0	22	0	0	0
33	GK	(Israel) ISR	Omer Hanin	0	0	0	0	0	0
37	GK	(Germany) GER	Finn Dahmen	0	0	0	0	0	0
Defenders
2	DF	(France) FRA	Ronaël Pierre-Gabriel	8	0	8	0	0	0
3	DF	(Spain) ESP	Aarón Martín	21	0	19+1	0	1	0
4	DF	(Netherlands) NED	Jerry St. Juste	21	2	19+1	2	0+1	0
13	DF	(Netherlands) NED	Jeffrey Bruma	7	0	7	0	0	0
16	DF	(Germany) GER	Stefan Bell	1	0	0	0	1	0
17	DF	(Germany) GER	Jonathan Meier	0	0	0	0	0	0
18	DF	(Germany) GER	Daniel Brosinski	21	2	13+7	2	1	0
19	DF	(France) FRA	Moussa Niakhaté	28	0	27	0	1	0
23	DF	(Austria) AUT	Phillipp Mwene	2	0	2	0	0	0
31	DF	(Turkey) TUR	Ahmet Gürleyen	0	0	0	0	0	0
42	DF	(Germany) GER	Alexander Hack	11	0	8+3	0	0	0
Midfielders
5	MF	(Netherlands) NED	Jean-Paul Boëtius	25	3	23+1	3	1	0
6	MF	(Germany) GER	Danny Latza	19	0	10+8	0	1	0
8	MF	(Germany) GER	Levin Öztunalı	21	4	17+4	4	0	0
14	MF	(Cameroon) CMR	Pierre Kunde	23	3	19+4	3	0	0
20	MF	(Switzerland) SUI	Edimilson Fernandes	20	0	17+2	0	1	0
34	MF	(Germany) GER	Bote Baku	26	1	22+3	1	1	0
35	MF	(Luxembourg) LUX	Leandro Barreiro	13	0	8+5	0	0	0
Forwards
7	FW	(Sweden) SWE	Robin Quaison	28	12	26+1	12	1	0
9	FW	(France) FRA	Jean-Philippe Mateta	12	2	6+6	2	0	0
11	FW	(South Korea) KOR	Ji Dong-won	2	0	1+1	0	0	0
21	FW	(Austria) AUT	Karim Onisiwo	27	4	13+13	4	1	0
22	FW	(Nigeria) NGR	Taiwo Awoniyi	9	1	2+7	1	0	0
28	FW	(Hungary) HUN	Ádám Szalai	22	1	12+10	1	0	0
29	FW	(Germany) GER	Jonathan Burkardt	7	0	1+5	0	0+1	0
30	FW	(Germany) GER	Cyrill Akono	0	0	0	0	0	0
Players transferred out during the season
10	MF	(Romania) ROU	Alexandru Maxim	6	0	0+5	0	0+1	0

Last updated: 28 May 2020
Source: Competitions
