= Karim Onisiwo =

Austrian footballer (born 1992)

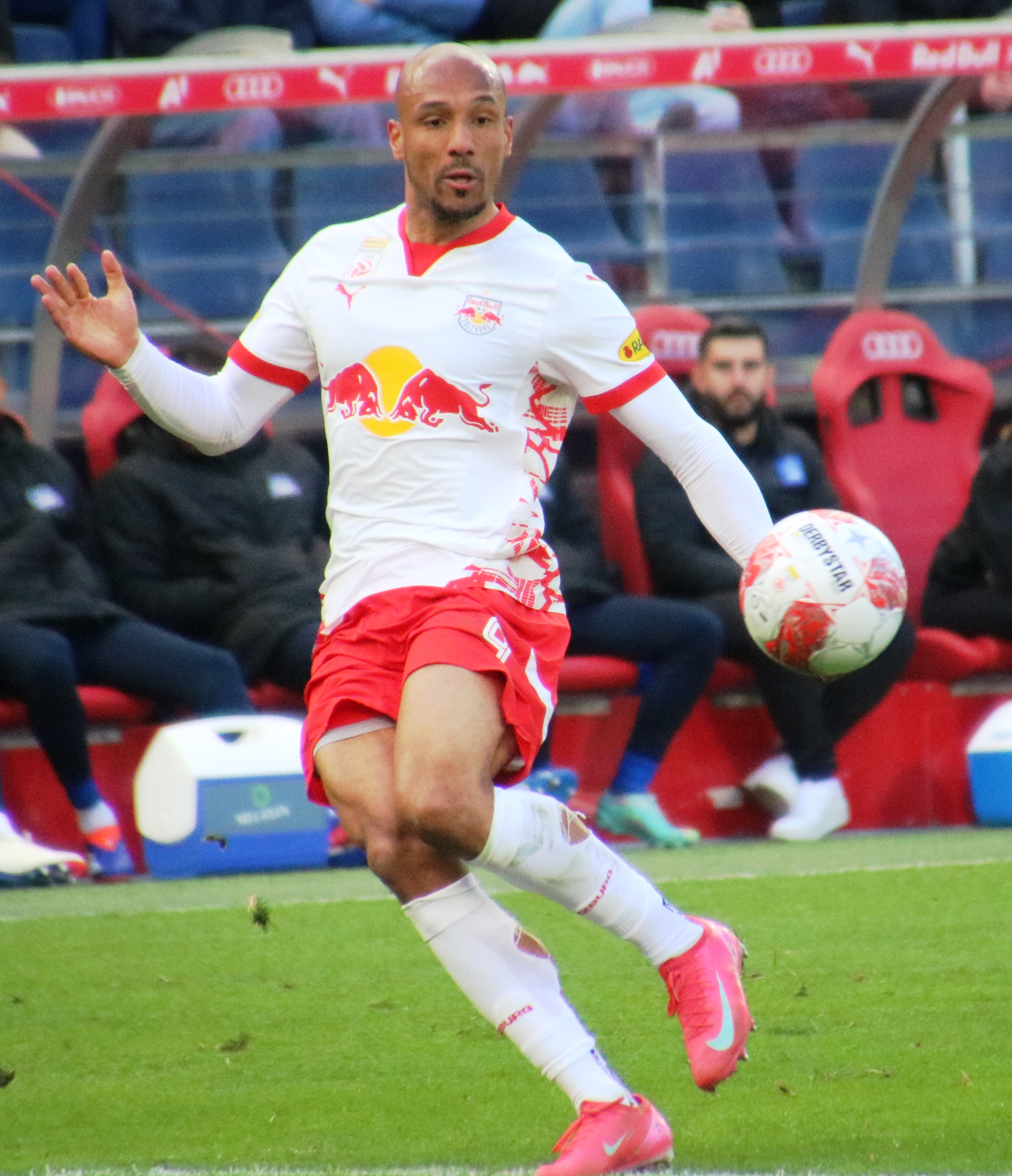
- Onisiwo playing for Red Bull Salzburg in 2025

Personal information
- Full name: Karim Onisiwo
- Date of birth: 17 March 1992 (age 34)
- Place of birth: Vienna, Austria
- Height: 1.88 m (6 ft 2 in)
- Positions: Forward; right winger

Senior career*
Years	Team	Apps	(Gls)
2010–2011	SC Ostbahn XI	23	(7)
2011–2012	TSV Neumarkt	16	(8)
2012–2014	Austria Salzburg	31	(18)
2014–2016	SV Mattersburg	51	(20)
2016–2025	Mainz 05	214	(33)
2025–2026	Red Bull Salzburg	29	(2)

International career^{‡}
2014	Austria U21	1	(0)
2015–2023	Austria	24	(1)
- * Club domestic league appearances and goals as of 19:00, 17 May 2026 (UTC) ‡ National team caps and goals as of 23:30, 17 October 2023 (UTC)

Karim Onisiwo (born 17 March 1992) is an Austrian professional footballer who plays as a forward or right winger.

== Club career ==
Onisiwo joined Austria Salzburg in 2012. After two years in SV Mattersburg, he joined German side Mainz 05 in January 2016. He scored his first goal for Mainz on 7 May 2016 in a 3–1 win against VfB Stuttgart. In his first full season in Mainz, Onisiwo played in the UEFA Europa League and finished as 3rd in group stage. He scored his first hat-trick for the club on 28 January 2023 in a 5–2 win against VfL Bochum. He extended his contract with Mainz 05 until 2026.

On 2 January 2025, Onisiwo returned to Austria and signed a contract with Red Bull Salzburg until 30 June 2026. He left Red Bull Salzburg at the end of the contract.

== International career ==
Onisiwo was born in Austria to a Nigerian father and Austrian mother. He made his debut for the senior Austria squad as a substitute, in a friendly against Switzerland in November 2015.

== Career statistics ==
=== Club ===
As of match played 17 May 2026

Appearances and goals by club, season and competition
Club	Season	League			National cup (Note: Includes Austrian Cup, DFB-Pokal)		Europe		Other		Total	
Club	Season	Division	Apps	Goals	Apps	Goals	Apps	Goals	Apps	Goals	Apps	Goals
TSV Neumarkt	2011–12	1. Landesliga	16	8	1	0	—		—		17	8
Austria Salzburg	2013–14	Austrian Second League	31	18	2	0	—		—		33	18
SV Mattersburg	2014–15	Austrian Second League	33	18	2	0	—		—		35	18
SV Mattersburg	2014–15	Austrian Bundesliga	18	2	3	1	—		—		21	3
SV Mattersburg	Total		51	20	5	1	—		—		56	21
Mainz 05	2015–16	Bundesliga	9	1	0	0	—		—		9	1
Mainz 05	2016–17	Bundesliga	16	1	2	0	3 (Note: Appearances in UEFA Europa League)	0	—		21	1
Mainz 05	2017–18	Bundesliga	8	0	2	0	—		—		10	0
Mainz 05	2018–19	Bundesliga	26	7	1	0	—		—		27	7
Mainz 05	2019–20	Bundesliga	32	4	1	0	—		—		33	4
Mainz 05	2020–21	Bundesliga	31	4	1	0	—		—		32	4
Mainz 05	2021–22	Bundesliga	31	5	2	2	—		—		33	7
Mainz 05	2022–23	Bundesliga	31	10	3	0	—		—		34	10
Mainz 05	2023–24	Bundesliga	24	1	2	0	—		—		26	1
Mainz 05	2024–25	Bundesliga	6	0	2	0	—		—		8	0
Mainz 05	Total		214	33	16	2	3	0	0	0	233	35
Red Bull Salzburg	2024–25	Austrian Bundesliga	8	1	1	0	—		3 (Note: Appearances in FIFA Club World Cup)	1	12	2
Red Bull Salzburg	2025–26	Austrian Bundesliga	21	1	2	0	8 (Note: Two appearances in UEFA Champions League, six appearances in UEFA Europa League)	1	—		31	2
Red Bull Salzburg	Total		29	2	3	0	8	1	3	1	43	4
Career total			341	75	27	3	11	1	3	1	383	86

=== International ===
Appearances and goals by national team and year
National team	Year	Apps	Goals
Austria	2015	1	0
Austria	2016	1	0
Austria	2019	4	0
Austria	2020	4	1
Austria	2021	5	0
Austria	2022	5	0
Austria	2023	4	0
Total		24	1

Scores and results list Austria's goal tally first, score column indicates score after each Onisiwo goal.

List of international goals scored by Karim Onisiwo
No.	Date	Venue	Opponent	Score	Result	Competition
1	7 September 2020	Wörthersee Stadion, Klagenfurt, Austria	Romania	2–3	2–3	2020–21 UEFA Nations League B
