= Edimilson Fernandes =

Swiss footballer (born 1996)

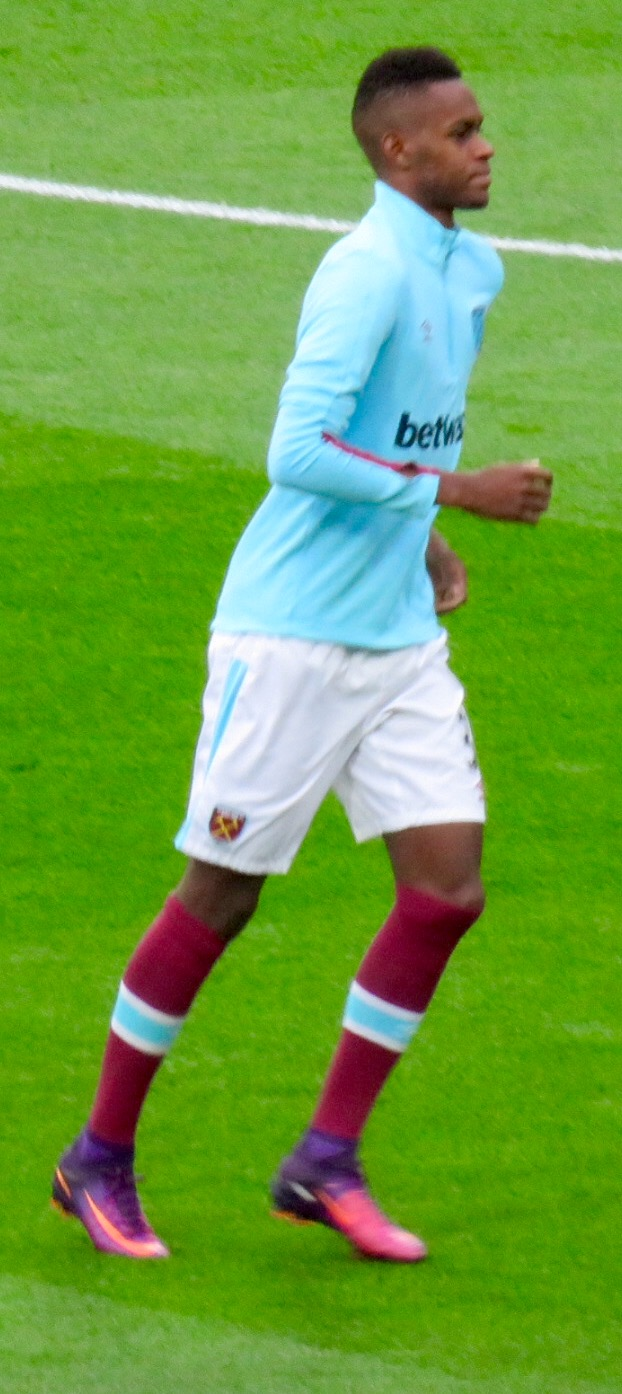
- Fernandes training with West Ham United in 2016

Personal information
- Full name: Edimilson Fernandes Ribeiro
- Date of birth: 15 April 1996 (age 30)
- Place of birth: Sion, Switzerland
- Height: 1.86 m (6 ft 1 in)
- Positions: Defensive midfielder; defender

Team information
- Current team: Young Boys
- Number: 6

Youth career
- 2007–2013: Sion

Senior career*
Years	Team	Apps	(Gls)
2013–2016	Sion	48	(2)
2016–2019	West Ham United	42	(0)
2018–2019	→ Fiorentina (loan)	29	(2)
2019–2025	Mainz 05	91	(1)
2021–2022	→ Arminia Bielefeld (loan)	7	(0)
2022	→ Young Boys (loan)	14	(2)
2024–2025	→ Brest (loan)	19	(0)
2025–	Young Boys	33	(3)

International career
2016	Switzerland U21	5	(2)
2016–2024	Switzerland	34	(2)
- * Club domestic league appearances and goals as of 19 September 2026

Edimilson Fernandes Ribeiro (born 15 April 1996) is a Swiss professional footballer who plays as a defensive midfielder or defender for Young Boys.

== Club career ==
=== Sion ===
Fernandes is a youth exponent from FC Sion. He made his Swiss Super League debut on 1 June 2013 against FC Zürich in 4–2 home win. He started in the first eleven and was substituted after 53 minutes. He scored his first senior goal on 1 March 2015 in a 2–2 draw at home to FC Luzern. Fernandes played every minute of Sion's 2015–16 Europa League campaign before the side was eliminated by Braga in the last 32. In all games, he played 65 times for Sion's first team and 41 games for the club's under-21 side.

=== West Ham United ===
On 25 August 2016, Fernandes signed a four-year deal with English club West Ham United for a fee of £5 million. He made his West Ham debut on 25 September 2016 in a 3–0 home defeat by Southampton, coming on as an 82nd-minute substitute for Mark Noble. On 26 October 2016, Fernandes scored his first goal for West Ham in a 2–1 win against Chelsea in the EFL Cup, winning praise from manager Slaven Bilić.

==== Loan to Fiorentina ====
On 13 August 2018, Fernandes joined Italian side Fiorentina on a one-year loan deal with an option to buy.

=== Mainz 05 ===
On 3 June 2019, Fernandes joined Bundesliga side Mainz 05 on a four-year deal for an undisclosed fee. On 17 August 2019, he made his full debut for the club in the league season opener against SC Freiburg, starting and playing 84 minutes of a 3–0 loss while picking up a first-half yellow card.

Fernandes scored his first goal for Mainz in the penultimate Bundesliga game of the 2019–20 season. After being substituted on in the second half, he scored the third goal in Mainz's 3–1 win over Werder Bremen.

==== Loan to Young Boys ====
On 15 February 2022, Fernandes moved on loan to Young Boys until the end of the season.

==== Loan to Brest ====
On 30 August 2024, Fernandes signed for Ligue 1 club Brest on loan for the season, with an option for the club to make the deal permanent.

=== Return to Young Boys ===
On 14 July 2025, Fernandes returned to Young Boys on a permanent basis, signing a four-year contract with the club.

== International career ==
Fernandes made his debut for the Switzerland under-21 team in March 2016 in a 1–1 draw with England. In his second game, on 2 September 2016, he scored his first international goal in a 3–0 home win against Kazakhstan in Biel/Bienne.

In November 2016, Fernandes received his first call-up to the senior Switzerland squad for a match against the Faroe Islands. He made his senior debut against them, coming off the bench in the 69th minute.

In May 2019, Fernandes played in 2019 UEFA Nations League Finals, where his team finished fourth.

In May 2021, Fernandes was called up to the 26-man Swiss squad for UEFA Euro 2020, where Switzerland reached the quarter-finals of the tournament.

== Personal life ==
Fernandes was born in Sion, Switzerland, to a family of Portuguese and Cape Verdean descent. He is the cousin of former Swiss international footballer Gelson Fernandes, Portuguese international footballer Manuel Fernandes and former Sunderland midfielder Cabral.

== Career statistics ==
=== Club ===
As of match played 19 September 2026

Appearances and goals by club, season and competition
Club	Season	League			National cup (Note: Includes Swiss Cup, FA Cup, Coppa Italia, DFB-Pokal)		League cup (Note: Includes EFL Cup)		Europe		Total	
Club	Season	Division	Apps	Goals	Apps	Goals	Apps	Goals	Apps	Goals	Apps	Goals
Sion	2012–13	Swiss Super League	1	0	0	0	—		—		1	0
Sion	2013–14	Swiss Super League	16	1	0	0	—		—		16	1
Sion	2014–15	Swiss Super League	26	1	3	2	—		—		29	3
Sion	2015–16	Swiss Super League	5	0	4	2	—		8 (Note: Appearances in UEFA Europa League)	0	17	2
Sion	Total		48	2	7	4	—		8	0	63	6
West Ham United	2016–17	Premier League	28	0	1	0	3	1	0	0	32	1
West Ham United	2017–18	Premier League	14	0	0	0	2	0	—		16	0
West Ham United	Total		42	0	1	0	5	1	0	0	48	1
Fiorentina (loan)	2018–19	Serie A	29	2	4	0	—		—		33	2
Mainz 05	2019–20	Bundesliga	24	1	1	0	—		—		25	1
Mainz 05	2020–21	Bundesliga	14	0	1	0	—		—		15	0
Mainz 05	2022–23	Bundesliga	32	0	2	0	—		—		34	0
Mainz 05	2023–24	Bundesliga	21	0	2	0	—		—		23	0
Mainz 05	Total		91	1	6	0	0	0	0	0	97	1
Arminia Bielefeld (loan)	2021–22	Bundesliga	7	0	1	0	—		—		8	0
Young Boys (loan)	2021–22	Swiss Super League	14	2	0	0	—		—		14	2
Brest (loan)	2024–25	Ligue 1	19	3	3	0	—		10 (Note: Appearances in UEFA Champions League)	1	32	4
Young Boys	2025–26	Swiss Super League	27	2	1	0	—		7	0	35	2
Young Boys	2026–27	Swiss Super League	6	1	0	0	—		—		6	1
Young Boys	Total		33	3	1	0	—		7	0	41	3
Career total			283	13	23	4	5	1	25	1	336	19

=== International ===
Appearances and goals by national team and year
National team	Year	Apps	Goals
Switzerland	2016	1	0
Switzerland	2017	2	0
Switzerland	2018	5	0
Switzerland	2019	6	1
Switzerland	2020	5	0
Switzerland	2021	3	1
Switzerland	2022	3	0
Switzerland	2023	5	0
Switzerland	2024	4	0
Total		34	2

Scores and results list Switzerland's goal tally first, score column indicates score after each Fernandes goal.

List of international goals scored by Edimilson Fernandes
No.	Date	Venue	Opponent	Score	Result	Competition
1	15 October 2019	Stade de Genève, Geneva, Switzerland	Republic of Ireland	2–0	2–0	UEFA Euro 2020 qualification
2	3 June 2021	Kybunpark, St. Gallen, Switzerland	Liechtenstein	7–0	7–0	Friendly

== Honours ==
Sion

- Swiss Cup: 2014–15
