= Moussa Niakhaté =

Footballer (born 1996)

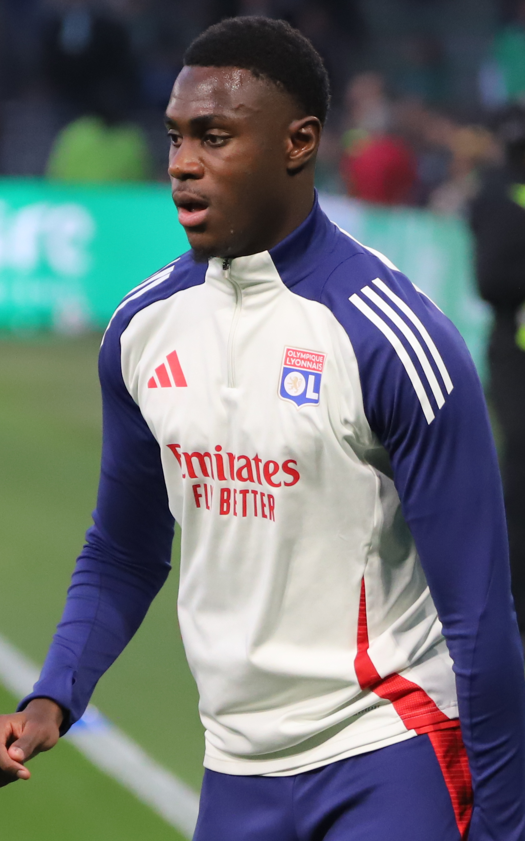
- Niakhaté with Lyon in 2025

Personal information
- Full name: Moussa Niakhaté
- Date of birth: 8 March 1996 (age 30)
- Place of birth: Roubaix, France
- Height: 1.90 m (6 ft 3 in)
- Position: Centre-back

Team information
- Current team: Lyon
- Number: 19

Youth career
- 2002–2004: AMCS Comines
- 2004–2011: Lille
- 2011–2012: Wasquehal
- 2012–2013: Boulogne

Senior career*
Years	Team	Apps	(Gls)
2013–2016	Valenciennes B	33	(0)
2014–2017	Valenciennes	72	(1)
2017–2018	Metz	35	(0)
2018–2022	Mainz 05	128	(9)
2022–2024	Nottingham Forest	35	(1)
2024–	Lyon	68	(0)

International career^{‡}
2014–2015	France U19	3	(0)
2015–2016	France U20	8	(0)
2018–2019	France U21	11	(0)
2023–	Senegal	40	(0)
Medal record
Men's football
Representing Senegal
Africa Cup of Nations
Runner-up	2025 Morocco
- * Club domestic league appearances and goals as of 18 October 2026 ‡ National team caps and goals as of 16 November 2026

Moussa Niakhaté (born 8 March 1996) is a professional footballer who plays as a centre-back for Ligue 1 club Lyon. Born in France, he plays for the Senegal national team.

== Club career ==
=== Valenciennes ===
On 20 October 2014, he made his professional debut for Valenciennes in a home match against Dijon. On 1 July 2015, he signed his first professional contract with Valenciennes, a three-year deal.

For the 2016–17 season, Faruk Hadžibegić made him one of the key players in his squad. On 19 December 2016, he scored his first goal in an away match against Auxerre.

=== Metz ===
On 22 June 2017, he joined Metz on a four-year deal. He quickly established himself as a promising young player and was called up several times to the France under-21 team by Sylvain Ripoll. At Metz, he became an undisputed starter and a key figure in the club’s central defense. During the 2017–18 season, he made 35 appearances and provided an assist in a match against Montpellier HSC in December 2017.

=== Mainz 05 ===
His season allowed him to sign with Mainz on 7 July 2018 for a fee of €10 million plus bonuses.

After wearing the captain's armband several times between 2019 and 2021 whenever the captain Danny Latza was absent, he became the captain following Latza's departure during the 2021–22 season, making him the youngest captain in the Bundesliga.

=== Nottingham Forest ===
In July 2022, he moved to the Premier League by signing with Nottingham Forest. In only his second match, he suffered a hamstring injury, with his absence expected to last several months. He eventually returned in March 2023 after more than five months on the sidelines, having missed over thirty matches in all competitions.

He established himself as a reliable defender in the league and took part in thirty-seven matches over two seasons.

=== Lyon ===
On 4 July 2024, he joined Olympique Lyonnais. He became the second most expensive player in the club's history, behind Orel Mangala. After a first season of adaptation, he established himself as a key figure in Lyon's central defense during the 2025–26 season. As one of the squad's vice-captains behind Corentin Tolisso, he scored his first goal for Lyon on 27 November 2025, from a penalty against Israeli side Maccabi Tel Aviv, contributing to a 6–0 victory for OL in the UEFA Europa League.

== International career ==
Born in France, Niakhaté is Senegalese by descent. He is a former youth international for France. He debuted with the senior Senegal national team in a 5–1 2023 Africa Cup of Nations qualification win over Mozambique on 24 March 2023.

In December 2023, Niakhaté was named in Senegal's squad for the postponed 2023 Africa Cup of Nations held in the Ivory Coast. In their round of 16 match against the hosts, he missed a penalty in the shoot-out which Senegal lost 5–4 following a 1–1 draw after extra time.

On January 18, 2026, he won the 2025 Africa Cup of Nations with Senegal, defeating Morocco 1–0 after extra time. Two months later, the title was withdrawn from Senegal and awarded to Morocco by forfeit. The CAF sanctioned the Senegalese team for leaving the pitch to protest a refereeing decision before returning a few minutes later.

On May 21, 2026, Niakhaté was officially selected by Senegal's coach Pape Thiaw from his list of 28 players to participate in the 2026 FIFA World Cup.

== Career statistics ==
=== Club ===
As of match played 18 October 2026

Appearances and goals by club, season and competition
Club	Season	League			National Cup		League Cup		Continental		Total	
Club	Season	Division	Apps	Goals	Apps	Goals	Apps	Goals	Apps	Goals	Apps	Goals
Valenciennes B	2013–14	CFA 2	13	0	—		—		—		13	0
Valenciennes B	2014–15	CFA 2	16	0	—		—		—		16	0
Valenciennes B	2015–16	CFA 2	4	0	—		—		—		4	0
Valenciennes B	Total		33	0	—		—		—		33	0
Valenciennes	2014–15	Ligue 2	9	0	1	0	0	0	—		10	0
Valenciennes	2015–16	Ligue 2	28	0	1	0	1	0	—		30	0
Valenciennes	2016–17	Ligue 2	35	1	1	0	1	0	—		37	1
Valenciennes	Total		72	1	3	0	2	0	—		77	1
Metz	2017–18	Ligue 1	35	0	1	0	2	0	—		38	0
Mainz 05	2018–19	Bundesliga	33	1	1	0	—		—		34	1
Mainz 05	2019–20	Bundesliga	33	1	1	0	—		—		34	1
Mainz 05	2020–21	Bundesliga	32	3	2	0	—		—		34	3
Mainz 05	2021–22	Bundesliga	30	4	3	0	—		—		33	4
Mainz 05	Total		128	9	7	0	—		—		135	9
Nottingham Forest	2022–23	Premier League	14	0	0	0	0	0	—		14	0
Nottingham Forest	2023–24	Premier League	21	1	1	0	1	0	—		23	1
Nottingham Forest	Total		35	1	1	0	1	0	—		37	1
Lyon	2024–25	Ligue 1	31	0	2	0	—		9 (Note: Appearances in UEFA Europa League)	0	42	0
Lyon	2025–26	Ligue 1	32	0	2	0	—		9	1	43	1
Lyon	2026–27	Ligue 1	5	0	0	0	—		4 (Note: Three appearances in UEFA Champions League, one appearance in UEFA Europa League)	0	9	0
Lyon	Total		68	0	4	0	—		22	1	94	1
Career total			361	11	16	0	5	0	22	1	415	12

=== International ===
As of match played 16 November 2026

Appearances and goals by national team and year
National team	Year	Apps	Goals
Senegal	2023	7	0
Senegal	2024	9	0
Senegal	2025	9	0
Senegal	2026	15	0
Total		40	0

== Honours ==
Individual

- Africa Cup of Nations Team of the Tournament: 2025
