= Cyrill Akono =

German footballer

Personal information
- Date of birth: 29 February 2000 (age 26)
- Place of birth: Münster, Germany
- Height: 1.90 m (6 ft 3 in)
- Position: Forward

Team information
- Current team: SV Meppen
- Number: 9

Youth career
- 2004–2012: SV Südkirchen
- 2012–2015: VfB Waltrop
- 2015–2016: Schalke 04
- 2016–2018: Preußen Münster

Senior career*
Years	Team	Apps	(Gls)
2018–2019	Preußen Münster	17	(5)
2019–2021	Mainz 05 II	23	(4)
2019–2021	Mainz 05	0	(0)
2021	→ VfB Lübeck (loan)	16	(3)
2021–2023	SC Verl	44	(12)
2023	Borussia Dortmund II	12	(0)
2023–2024	VfB Lübeck	29	(3)
2024–2026	Hallescher FC	34	(3)
2026	BSG Chemie Leipzig	15	(2)
2026–	SV Meppen	0	(0)
- * Club domestic league appearances and goals as of 22 June 2026

Cyrill Akono (born 29 February 2000) is a German professional footballer who plays as a forward for 3. Liga club SV Meppen.

== Club career ==
=== Mainz 05 ===
On 20 May 2019, Bundesliga club 1. FSV Mainz 05 announced that they had signed Akono from 3. Liga side SC Preußen Münster for the upcoming 2019–20 season.

=== Lübeck ===
He joined 3. Liga club VfB Lübeck on loan until the end of the season in January 2021.

=== Verl ===
In May 2021, it was announced that Akono would join SC Verl on a three-year contract for the 2021–22 season.

=== Borussia Dortmund II ===
In December 2022, it was announced that Akono would join Borussia Dortmund II on a one-year and half contract for the 2022–23 and 2023–24 season.

=== Return to Lübeck ===
On 24 June 2023, Akono signed a two-year contract with VfB Lübeck.

== Career statistics ==
=== Club ===
As of match played 25 February 2023

Appearances and goals by club, season and competition
Club	Season	League			National cup		Continental		Other		Total	
Club	Season	Division	Apps	Goals	Apps	Goals	Apps	Goals	Apps	Goals	Apps	Goals
SC Preußen Münster	2017–18	3. Liga	2	1	—		—		—		2	1
SC Preußen Münster	2018–19	3. Liga	15	4	1	0	—		—		16	4
SC Preußen Münster	Total		17	5	1	0	—		—		18	5
Mainz II	2019–20	Regionalliga Südwest	18	3	—		—		—		18	3
Mainz II	2020–21	Regionalliga Südwest	5	1	—		—		—		5	1
Mainz II	Total		23	4	—		—		—		23	4
VfB Lübeck (loan)	2020–21	3. Liga	16	3	—		—		—		16	3
SC Verl	2021–22	3. Liga	27	8	2	0	—		—		29	8
SC Verl	2022–23	3. Liga	17	4	1	0	—		—		18	4
SC Verl	Total		44	12	3	0	—		—		47	12
Borussia Dortmund II	2022–23	3. Liga	7	0	—		—		—		7	0
Career total			107	24	4	0	0	0	0	0	111	24
