= David Mamutovic =

German footballer (born 2004)

Personal information
- Date of birth: 5 December 2000 (age 25)
- Place of birth: Germany
- Height: 1.89 m (6 ft 2 1/2 in)
- Position: Winger

Team information
- Current team: SV Sandhausen
- Number: 7

Youth career
- 2004–2012: SG Unterrath
- 2012–2017: Bayer Leverkusen
- 2017–2019: Bergisch Gladbach

Senior career*
Years	Team	Apps	(Gls)
2019–2021	Bergisch Gladbach	45	(3)
2021–2022	Rot Weiss Ahlen	33	(7)
2022–2025	Mainz II	55	(11)
2023–2024	Mainz	2	(0)
2025–	SV Sandhausen	35	(6)
- * Club domestic league appearances and goals as of 24 September 2026

David Mamutovic (Serbian: Давид Мамутовић, romanized: David Mamutović; born 5 December 2000) is a German professional footballer who plays as a winger for Regionalliga Südwest club SV Sandhausen.

== Playing career ==
Mamutovic is a youth product of SG Unterrath, Bayer Leverkusen and Bergisch Gladbach. He began his senior career with Bergisch Gladbach in the Regionalliga in 2019. He spent the 2021–22 season with Rot Weiss Ahlen. On 20 May 2022, he moved to Mainz, where he was originally assigned to their reserves. On 15 December 2023, he signed his first professional contract with Mainz until 2025. He made his professional debut with the senior Mainz team as a late substitute in a 1–0 Bundesliga loss to Heidenheim on 16 December 2023.

== International career ==
Born in Germany, Mamutovic is of Serbian and Polish descent. He was called up to a training camp with the Germany U15s.
