= SV Sandhausen =

German association football club from Sandhausen, Baden-Württemberg

- Full name: Sportverein Sandhausen 1916 e.V.
- Founded: 1916; 110 years ago
- Ground: Hardtwaldstadion
- Capacity: 15,414
- Chairman: Jürgen Machmeier
- Head coach: Olaf Janßen
- League: Regionalliga Südwest (IV)
- 2025–26: Regionalliga Südwest, 8th of 18
- Website: svs1916.de
Home colours	Away colours	Third colours

Sportverein Sandhausen 1916 e.V., commonly known as simply SV Sandhausen or Sandhausen, is a German association football club that plays in Sandhausen, immediately to the south of Heidelberg in Baden-Württemberg. It is Germany's smallest professional football club.

The club's greatest success came in 2011–12 when it won the 3. Liga and earned promotion to the 2. Bundesliga for the first time.

== History ==
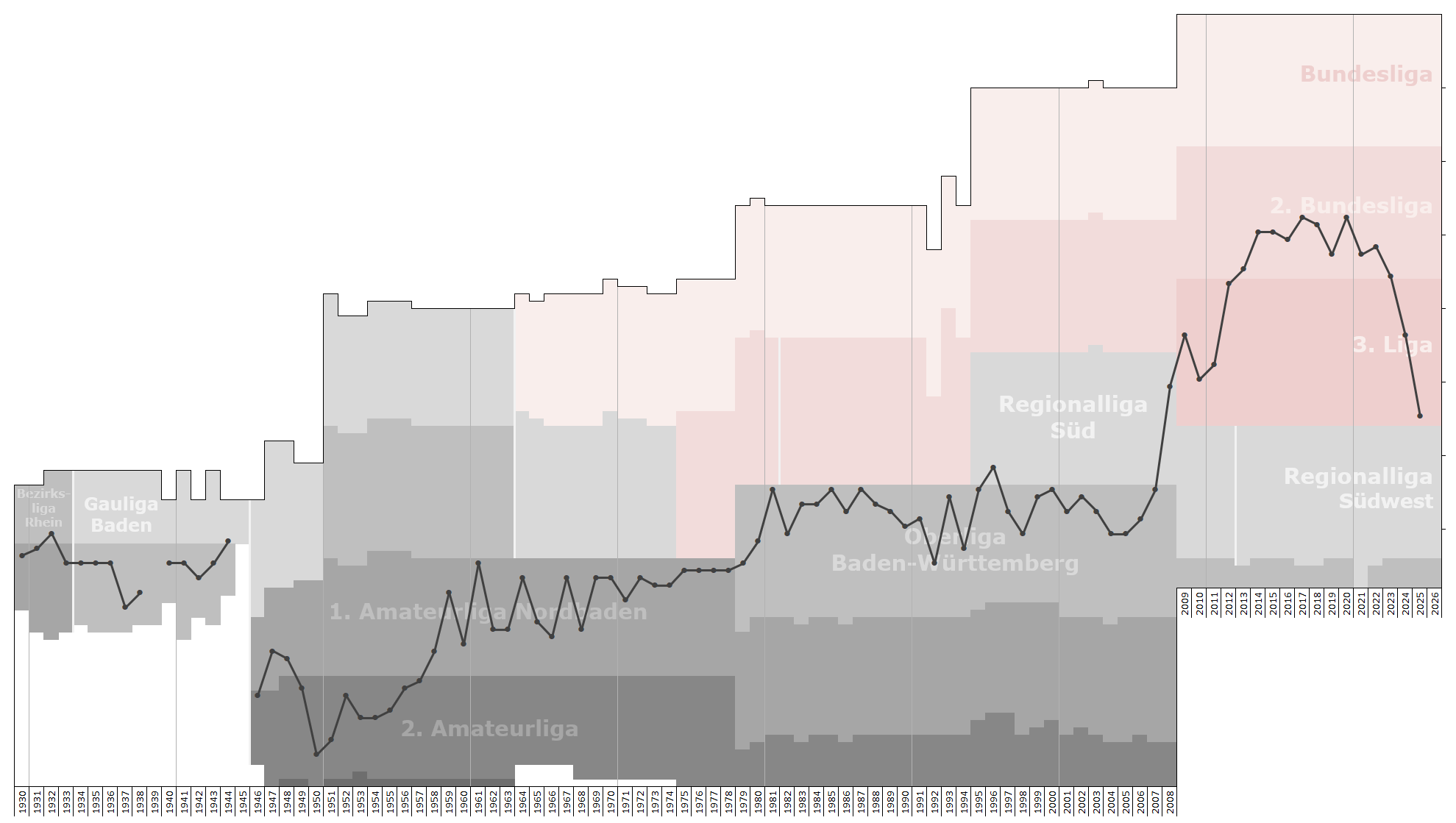
Historical chart of Sandhausen league performance

After an initial period of financial instability, the club advanced steadily through the lower leagues until it earned promotion to the Bezirksliga Rhein-Saar in 1931, but only played for a single season at that level before descending again. In 1943, it was merged with TSV Walldorf and VfB Wiesloch to form the wartime squad KSG Walldorf-Wiesloch. The combined squad was dissolved at the end of the conflict and SG Sandhausen was reestablished as an independent club late in 1945. A half dozen years later it re-claimed its original name. Sandhausen played football in the Landesliga or 2. Amateurliga until 1956, when it advanced to the 1.Amateurliga Nordbaden. In 1977, the team finished as runner-up in the German amateur championship and progressed to the Oberliga Baden-Württemberg in 1978, where it consistently earned finishes in the upper half of the table. Sandhausen won three Oberliga titles through the 1980s and the German Amateur Championship in 1993. It won back-to-back Oberliga titles in 1995 and 2000 and, with its latest title in 2007, gained promotion to the Regionalliga Süd (III).

Negotiations held in late 2005 and early 2006 to merge Sandhausen with TSG 1899 Hoffenheim and FC Astoria Walldorf to create FC Heidelberg 06 were abandoned due to resistance to the idea on the part of both Sandhausen and Walldorf, and the failure to agree on whether the new side's stadium should be located in Heidelberg.

In the 2007–08 season, Sandhausen finished fifth in the Regionalliga Süd, which qualified the club for the newly created 3. Liga. After four seasons in the 3. Liga, the club won the 2011–12 title to earn promotion to the 2. Bundesliga for the first time.

Sandhausen finished its first 2. Bundesliga season in a relegation position but retained its place after MSV Duisburg were denied a licence for the following season. The club then established itself at the second level, avoiding relegation in each of the following ten seasons before finishing bottom in 2022–23, a defeat at 1. FC Heidenheim confirming its return to the 3. Liga with a game to spare after eleven seasons in the division.

Sandhausen did not return immediately, finishing eighth in 2023–24. The following season the club topped the table after 14 matches but then collapsed, losing its final nine games—equalling the division's record losing run—to finish 19th and drop into the Regionalliga Südwest. The relegation ended seventeen years of professional football for the club.

== Players ==
=== Current squad ===
As of 8 September 2026

Note: Flags indicate national team as defined under FIFA eligibility rules; some limited exceptions apply. Players may hold more than one non-FIFA nationality.

No.	Pos.	Nation	Player
1	GK	GER	Arthur Lyska
2	DF	GER	Kwabe Schulz
5	DF	GER	Pablo Zahnen-Martinez
6	MF	GER	Niklas Tarnat
7	FW	GER	David Mamutovic
8	MF	GER	Leon Ampadu
9	FW	GER	Maximilian Wagner
10	FW	GER	Felix Lohkemper
11	FW	TUR	Mert Tasdelen
13	MF	GER	Yannick Osee
16	FW	GER	Luka Vukoja
17	FW	GER	Yanis Outman
18	FW	GER	Tim Korzuschek
19	DF	GER	Dennis Pfaffenrot
20	FW	GER	Phil Halbauer

No.	Pos.	Nation	Player
21	DF	GER	Lukas Mazagg
22	DF	TUR	Seyhan Yiğit
23	DF	GER	Teoman Akestanli
24	DF	GER	Ken Gipson
25	FW	GER	Nico Nollenberger
26	MF	GER	Max Christiansen
27	FW	GER	Stefan Maderer
29	FW	GRE	Tasos Leonidis
30	GK	GER	Luis Idjakovic
31	GK	GER	Lukas Schneller
33	MF	SUI	Marco Kehl-Gómez
40	GK	GER	Noah Loos
42	DF	GER	Imad Jaadar
44	DF	GER	Gaoussou Dabo
47	MF	KOS	Arianit Ferati

=== Out on loan ===
Note: Flags indicate national team as defined under FIFA eligibility rules; some limited exceptions apply. Players may hold more than one non-FIFA nationality.

No. / Pos. / Nation / Player	No. / Pos. / Nation / Player

== Honours ==
The club's honours:

=== League ===
- German amateur championship
  - Champions: 1978, 1993
  - Runners-up: 1977
- 3. Liga
  - Champions: 2012
- Oberliga Baden-Württemberg (III/IV)
  - Champions: 1981, 1985, 1987, 1995, 2000, 2007
- Amateurliga Nordbaden (III)
  - Champions: 1961

=== Cup ===
- Baden Cup (Tiers III–VII)
  - Winners: 1977, 1978, 1981, 1982, 1983, 1985, 1986, 1995, 2006, 2007, 2010^{‡}, 2011, 2024, 2025
  - Runners-up: 1996, 2003, 2009^{‡}

- ^{‡} Won by reserve team.

== Club management ==
=== Coaching staff ===
Position	Name
Head coach	(Germany) Olaf Janßen
Head goalkeeping coach	(Germany) Daniel Ischdonat
Head athletic coach	(Spain) Rafael Lopez
Sporting director	(Germany) Matthias Imhof
Doctor	(Germany) PD Dr. med. Nikolaus Streich (Germany) Dr. Falko Frese
Physiotherapist	(Germany) Niklas Schmitt
Medical director physiotherapy	(Germany) Christian Bieser
Team official	(Germany) Andreas Zesewitz
Kit manager	(Turkey) Muhterem Kocaman
Academy staff	(Germany) Rolf Fetzer
Team manager	(Germany) Philipp Klingmann

== Recent managers ==
Recent managers of the club:

Manager	Start	Finish
Hans-Jürgen Boysen	1 April 2001	30 June 2002
Willi Entenmann	1 July 2002	16 October 2002
?	?	?
Günter Sebert	1 June 2004	30 August 2005
Gerd Dais	1 September 2005	23 February 2010
Frank Leicht	25 February 2010	13 September 2010
Pavel Dotchev	13 September 2010	14 February 2011
Gerd Dais	17 February 2011	19 November 2012
Hans-Jürgen Boysen	20 November 2012	30 June 2013
Alois Schwartz	1 June 2013	29 June 2016
Kenan Koçak	5 July 2016	8 October 2018
Uwe Koschinat	15 October 2018	24 November 2020
Michael Schiele	26 November 2020	16 February 2021
Stefan Kulovits/Gerhard Kleppinger	16 February 2021	21 September 2021
Alois Schwartz	22 September 2021	19 February 2023
Tomas Oral	20 February 2023	10 April 2023
Gerhard Kleppinger	10 April 2023	30 June 2023
Danny Galm	1 July 2023	22 October 2023
Jens Keller	23 October 2023	12 May 2024
Gerhard Kleppinger	13 May 2024	30 June 2024
Sreto Ristić	1 July 2024	22 December 2024
Kenan Koçak	28 December 2024	6 April 2025
Gerhard Kleppinger / Dennis Diekmeier	6 April 2025	30 June 2025
Olaf Janßen	1 July 2025	

== Recent seasons ==
The recent season-by-season performance of the club:

=== SV Sandhausen ===
Season	Division	Tier	Position
1999–2000	Oberliga Baden-Württemberg	IV	1st
2000–01	Oberliga Baden-Württemberg	IV	4th
2001–02	Oberliga Baden-Württemberg	IV	2nd
2002–03	Oberliga Baden-Württemberg	IV	4th
2003–04	Oberliga Baden-Württemberg	IV	7th
2004–05	Oberliga Baden-Württemberg	IV	7th
2005–06	Oberliga Baden-Württemberg	IV	5th
2006–07	Oberliga Baden-Württemberg	IV	1st ↑
2007–08	Regionalliga Süd	III	5th ↑
2008–09	3. Liga	III	8th
2009–10	3. Liga	III	14th
2010–11	3. Liga	III	12th
2011–12	3. Liga	III	1st ↑
2012–13	2. Bundesliga	II	17th
2013–14	2. Bundesliga	II	12th
2014–15	2. Bundesliga	II	12th
2015–16	2. Bundesliga	II	13th
2016–17	2. Bundesliga	II	10th
2017–18	2. Bundesliga	II	11th
2018–19	2. Bundesliga	II	15th
2019–20	2. Bundesliga	II	10th
2020–21	2. Bundesliga	II	15th
2021–22	2. Bundesliga	II	14th
2022–23	2. Bundesliga	II	18th ↓
2023–24	3. Liga	III	8th
2024–25	3. Liga	III	19th ↓
2025–26	Regionalliga Südwest	IV	8th

=== SV Sandhausen II ===
Season	Division	Tier	Position
1999–2000			
2000–01			
2001–02			
2002–03			
2003–04	Landesliga Rhein-Neckar	VI	10th
2004–05	Landesliga Rhein-Neckar	VI	13th
2005–06	Landesliga Rhein-Neckar	VI	9th
2006–07	Landesliga Rhein-Neckar	VI	12th
2007–08	Landesliga Rhein-Neckar	VI	1st ↑
2008–09	Verbandsliga Baden	VI	15th ↓
2009–10	Landesliga Rhein-Neckar	VII	1st ↑
2010–11	Verbandsliga Baden	VI	14th ↓
2011–12	Landesliga Rhein-Neckar	VII	1st ↑
2012–13	Verbandsliga Baden	VI	12th
2013–14	Verbandsliga Baden	VI	5th
2014–15	Verbandsliga Baden	VI	1st ↑
2015–16	Oberliga Baden-Württemberg	V	10th
2016–17	Oberliga Baden-Württemberg	V	11th
2017–18	Oberliga Baden-Württemberg	V	16th ↓
2018–19	Verbandsliga Baden	VI	2nd ↑

- With the introduction of the Regionalligas in 1994 and the 3. Liga in 2008 as the new third tier, below the 2. Bundesliga, all leagues below dropped one tier.

Key

↑ Promoted	↓ Relegated
